= 2024–25 in Polish football =

Football in Poland
- Season: 2024–25

Men's football
- Ekstraklasa: Lech Poznań
- I liga: Arka Gdynia
- II liga: Polonia Bytom
- Polish Cup: Legia Warsaw
- Polish Super Cup: Jagiellonia Białystok

2024–25 in Polish football
- Teams in Europe
- Jagiellonia Białystok; Wisła Kraków; Śląsk Wrocław; Legia Warsaw
- Poland national team
- 2024–25 UEFA Nations League; 2026 FIFA World Cup qualification

The 2024–25 season is the 100th season of competitive football in Poland.

== Men's football ==
=== League competitions ===
==== Ekstraklasa ====
Pos	Team	Pld	W	D	L	GF	GA	GD	Pts	Qualification or relegation
1	Lech Poznań (C)	34	22	4	8	68	31	+37	70	Qualification for Champions League second qualifying round
2	Raków Częstochowa	34	20	9	5	51	23	+28	69	Qualification for Conference League second qualifying round
3	Jagiellonia Białystok	34	17	10	7	56	42	+14	61	Qualification for Conference League second qualifying round
4	Pogoń Szczecin	34	17	7	10	59	40	+19	58	
5	Legia Warsaw	34	15	9	10	60	45	+15	54	Qualification for Europa League first qualifying round (Note: The 2024–25 Polish Cup winners (Legia Warsaw) qualify for the Europa League first qualifying round.)
6	Cracovia	34	14	9	11	58	53	+5	51	
7	Motor Lublin	34	14	7	13	48	59	−11	49 (Note: Ranked based on head-to-head points: Motor Lublin 4 pts, GKS Katowice - 1 pt.)	
8	GKS Katowice	34	14	7	13	49	47	+2	49	
9	Górnik Zabrze	34	13	8	13	43	39	+4	47	
10	Piast Gliwice	34	11	12	11	37	36	+1	45 (Note: Ranked based on head-to-head points: Piast Gliwice 4 pts, Korona Kielce - 1 pt.)	
11	Korona Kielce	34	11	12	11	37	45	−8	45	
12	Radomiak Radom	34	11	8	15	48	52	−4	41	
13	Widzew Łódź	34	11	7	16	38	49	−11	40	
14	Lechia Gdańsk	34	10	7	17	44	59	−15	37	
15	Zagłębie Lubin	34	10	6	18	33	51	−18	36	
16	Stal Mielec (R)	34	7	10	17	39	56	−17	31	Relegation to I liga
17	Śląsk Wrocław (R)	34	6	12	16	38	53	−15	30	Relegation to I liga
18	Puszcza Niepołomice (R)	34	6	10	18	37	63	−26	28	Relegation to I liga

Source: ekstraklasa.org 90minut.pl
Rules for classification: 1) Points; 2) Head-to-head points; 3) Head-to-head goal difference; 4) Goal difference; 5) Goals scored; 6) Number of wins; 7) Number of away wins; 8) Lower number of points based on yellow and red cards (red card = 3 points, yellow card = 1 point, sending-off = 3 points - including 1 point for first yellow card); 9) Fairplay ranking; 10) Draw.
(Note: Head-to-head record is used only after all the matches between the teams in question have been played)
(C) Champions; (R) Relegated

==== I liga ====
Pos	Team	Pld	W	D	L	GF	GA	GD	Pts	Promotion or Relegation
1	Arka Gdynia (C, P)	34	21	9	4	63	24	+39	72	Promotion to Ekstraklasa
2	Bruk-Bet Termalica Nieciecza (P)	34	21	8	5	70	39	+31	71	Promotion to Ekstraklasa
3	Wisła Płock (O, P)	34	18	10	6	58	38	+20	64	Qualification for the promotion play-offs
4	Wisła Kraków	34	18	8	8	63	32	+31	62	Qualification for the promotion play-offs
5	Miedź Legnica	34	16	8	10	56	45	+11	56 (Note: Ranked based on goal difference: Miedź Legnica +11, Polonia Warsaw +9.)	Qualification for the promotion play-offs
6	Polonia Warsaw	34	16	8	10	46	37	+9	56	Qualification for the promotion play-offs
7	GKS Tychy	34	13	14	7	47	36	+11	53	
8	Znicz Pruszków	34	14	10	10	52	43	+9	52	
9	Górnik Łęczna	34	13	11	10	50	42	+8	50	
10	Ruch Chorzów	34	13	9	12	50	46	+4	48	
11	ŁKS Łódź	34	13	8	13	50	41	+9	47	
12	Stal Rzeszów	34	9	8	17	42	59	−17	35	
13	Chrobry Głogów	34	8	9	17	37	59	−22	33	
14	Odra Opole	34	7	9	18	31	61	−30	30 (Note: Ranked based on head-to-head points: Odra Opole 6 pts, Pogoń Siedlce 0 pts.)	
15	Pogoń Siedlce	34	7	9	18	38	53	−15	30	
16	Kotwica Kołobrzeg (R)	34	6	11	17	29	55	−26	29	Relegation to II liga
17	Warta Poznań (R)	34	6	6	22	22	56	−34	24	Relegation to II liga
18	Stal Stalowa Wola (R)	34	4	11	19	27	65	−38	23	Relegation to II liga

Source: 1liga.org, 90minut.pl
Rules for classification: 1) Points; 2) Head-to-head points; 3) Head-to-head goal difference; 4) Goal difference; 6) Goals scored; 7) Number of wins; 8) Number of away wins.
(Note: Head-to-head record is used only after all the matches between the teams in question have been played)
(C) Champions; (O) Play-off winner; (P) Promoted; (R) Relegated

===== Promotion play-offs =====
Semi-finals; 29 May 2025
3	Wisła Płock	2
6	Polonia Warsaw	1
4	Wisła Kraków	0
5	Miedź Legnica	1

Final; 1 June 2025
3	Wisła Płock	2
5	Miedź Legnica	0

==== II liga ====
Pos	Team	Pld	W	D	L	GF	GA	GD	Pts	Promotion or Relegation
1	Polonia Bytom (C, P)	34	22	6	6	69	34	+35	72	Promotion to I liga
2	Pogoń Grodzisk Mazowiecki (P)	34	21	6	7	64	39	+25	69	Promotion to I liga
3	Wieczysta Kraków (Q)	34	19	6	9	65	29	+36	63 (Note: Ranked based on head-to-head points: Wieczysta Kraków 4 pts, Chojniczanka Chojnice 1 pt.)	Qualification for the promotion play-offs
4	Chojniczanka Chojnice (Q)	34	18	9	7	50	29	+21	63	Qualification for the promotion play-offs
5	Świt Szczecin (Q)	34	14	10	10	58	52	+6	52	Qualification for the promotion play-offs
6	KKS 1925 Kalisz (Q)	34	15	6	13	37	38	−1	51 (Note: Ranked based on head-to-head points: KKS 1925 Kalisz 6 pts, Podbeskidzie Bielsko-Biała 0 pts.)	Qualification for the promotion play-offs
7	Podbeskidzie Bielsko-Biała	34	14	9	11	44	35	+9	51	
8	Hutnik Kraków	34	14	7	13	49	59	−10	49	
9	Zagłębie Sosnowiec	34	12	10	12	48	52	−4	46	
10	Resovia Rzeszów	34	12	9	13	46	48	−2	45	
11	GKS Jastrzębie	34	12	6	16	35	34	+1	42 (Note: Ranked based on goal difference: GKS Jastrzębie +1, ŁKS Łódź II -8.)	
12	ŁKS Łódź II	34	11	9	14	41	49	−8	42	
13	Rekord Bielsko-Biała	34	10	11	13	50	54	−4	41	
14	Olimpia Grudziądz (Q)	34	11	7	16	42	51	−9	40	Qualification for the relegation play-offs
15	Wisła Puławy (Note: Wisła Puławy was punished with a deduction of 2 points and later relegated due to financial problems.) (R)	34	12	3	19	42	65	−23	37	Relegation to III liga
16	Zagłębie Lubin II (Note: Due to Kotwica Kołobrzeg and Wisła Puławy failing to obtain a license to play in the 2025–26 II liga, the last relegation play-off spot was passed down to Zagłębie Lubin II.) (Q)	34	9	7	18	51	58	−7	34	Qualification for the relegation play-offs
17	Skra Częstochowa (Note: Skra Częstochowa was punished with a deduction of 8 points for financial arrears.) (R)	34	9	4	21	32	60	−28	23	Relegation to III liga
18	Olimpia Elbląg (R)	34	4	9	21	30	67	−37	21	Relegation to III liga

Source: 90minut.pl
Rules for classification: 1) Points; 2) Head-to-head points; 3) Head-to-head goal difference; 4) Goal difference; 6) Goals scored; 7) Number of wins; 8) Number of away wins.
(Note: Head-to-head record is used only after all the matches between the teams in question have been played)
(C) Champions; (P) Promoted; (Q) Qualified for the phase indicated; (R) Relegated

===== Promotion play-offs =====
Semi-finals; 12 June 2025
3	Wieczysta Kraków
6	KKS 1925 Kalisz
4	Chojniczanka Chojnice
5	Świt Szczecin

Final; 15 June 2025

===== Relegation play-offs =====
Semi-finals; 11 June 2025
II	Błękitni Stargard
III	MKS Kluczbork
IV	Podhale Nowy Targ
I	Legia Warsaw II

Final; 14-15 & 18 June 2025
Winner SF1
16	Zagłębie Lubin II
Winner SF2
14	Olimpia Grudziądz

==== III liga ====
===== Group 1 =====
Pos	Team	Pld	W	D	L	GF	GA	GD	Pts	Promotion
1	Unia Skierniewice (C, P)	34	23	5	6	81	30	+51	74	Promotion to II liga
2	Legia Warsaw II (Q)	34	21	7	6	75	39	+36	70	Qualification to the promotion play-offs
3	ŁKS Łomża	34	18	10	6	68	38	+30	64	
4	Warta Sieradz	34	16	7	11	46	42	+4	55	
5	Wigry Suwałki	34	13	9	12	46	38	+8	48	
6	Jagiellonia Białystok II	34	13	8	13	54	49	+5	47 (Note: Ranked based on head-to-head goal difference: Jagiellonia II Białystok +2, Świt Nowy Dwór Mazowiecki -2.)	
7	Świt Nowy Dwór Mazowiecki	34	13	8	13	47	58	−11	47	
8	GKS Bełchatów	34	12	10	12	52	52	0	46 (Note: Ranked based on head-to-head points: GKS Bełchatów 7 pts, Broń Radom 5 pts, Lechia Tomaszów Mazowiecki 4 pts.)	
9	Broń Radom	34	12	10	12	40	48	−8	46	
10	Lechia Tomaszów Mazowiecki	34	13	7	14	57	64	−7	46	
11	Mławianka Mława	34	12	8	14	67	62	+5	44	
12	Wisła Płock II	34	11	10	13	54	58	−4	43	
13	GKS Wikielec	34	10	12	12	39	45	−6	42 (Note: Ranked based on head-to-head points: GKS Wikielec 4 pts, Stomil Olsztym 1 pt.)	
14	Stomil Olsztyn	34	11	9	14	44	56	−12	42	
15	Victoria Sulejówek (R)	34	11	8	15	52	59	−7	41 (Note: Ranked based on head-to-head goal difference: Victoria Sulejówek +3, Polonia Lidzbark Warmiński -3.)	Relegation to IV liga
16	Polonia Lidzbark Warmiński (R)	34	9	14	11	46	60	−14	41	Relegation to IV liga
17	Pelikan Łowicz (R)	34	9	6	19	34	58	−24	33	Relegation to IV liga
18	Sokół Aleksandrów Łódzki (R)	34	2	6	26	26	72	−46	12	Relegation to IV liga

Source: 90minut.pl Soccerway
Rules for classification: 1. Number of points reached in the entire series of games; 2. Number of points reached in direct matches; 3. Goal difference in direct matches; 4. Goal difference in direct matches – away goals counted twice; 5. Goal difference in the whole series of games; 6. Number of goals scored in the entire series of games.
(C) Champions; (P) Promoted; (Q) Qualified for the play-offs; (R) Relegated

===== Group 2 =====
Pos	Team	Pld	W	D	L	GF	GA	GD	Pts	Promotion
1	Sokół Kleczew (C, P)	34	22	6	6	60	35	+25	72	Promotion to II liga
2	Błękitni Stargard (Q)	34	19	6	9	78	45	+33	63	Qualification to the promotion play-offs
3	Zawisza Bydgoszcz	34	17	8	9	65	41	+24	59	
4	Pogoń Szczecin II	34	15	13	6	72	45	+27	58	
5	Lech Poznań II	34	16	9	9	65	47	+18	57	
6	Unia Swarzędz	34	15	10	9	58	47	+11	55	
7	Polonia Środa Wielkopolska	34	14	9	11	67	58	+9	51	
8	Pogoń Nowe Skalmierzyce	34	14	6	14	47	47	0	48	
9	Elana Toruń	34	11	14	9	44	42	+2	47	
10	Wda Świecie	34	12	10	12	47	41	+6	46	
11	Noteć Czarnków	34	13	6	15	61	64	−3	45	
12	Flota Świnoujście	34	12	8	14	48	56	−8	44	
13	Cartusia Kartuzy	34	12	7	15	43	51	−8	43	
14	Wybrzeże Rewalskie Rewal	34	10	7	17	32	54	−22	37	
15	Kotwica Kórnik	34	8	12	14	49	60	−11	36	
16	Gedania Gdańsk (R)	34	10	4	20	43	80	−37	34	Relegation to IV liga
17	Gryf Słupsk (R)	34	6	12	16	38	55	−17	30	Relegation to IV liga
18	Vineta Wolin (R)	34	4	5	25	48	97	−49	17	Relegation to IV liga

Source: 90minut.pl Soccerway
Rules for classification: 1. Number of points reached in the entire series of games; 2. Number of points reached in direct matches; 3. Goal difference in direct matches; 4. Goal difference in direct matches – away goals counted twice; 5. Goal difference in the whole series of games; 6. Number of goals scored in the entire series of games.
(C) Champions; (P) Promoted; (Q) Qualified for the play-offs; (R) Relegated

===== Group 3 =====
Pos	Team	Pld	W	D	L	GF	GA	GD	Pts	Promotion
1	Śląsk Wrocław II (C, P)	34	23	6	5	75	30	+45	75	Promotion to II liga
2	MKS Kluczbork (Q)	34	21	6	7	69	23	+46	69	Qualification to the promotion play-offs
3	Miedź Legnica II	34	20	7	7	72	45	+27	67	
4	Carina Gubin	34	19	6	9	62	36	+26	63	
5	Warta Gorzów Wielkopolski	34	18	7	9	57	39	+18	61	
6	LKS Goczałkowice-Zdrój	34	14	14	6	48	34	+14	56	
7	Ślęza Wrocław	34	14	10	10	56	47	+9	52 (Note: Ranked based on head-to-head points: Ślęza Wrocław 4 pts, Lechia Zielona Góra 1 pt.)	
8	Lechia Zielona Góra	34	15	7	12	48	37	+11	52	
9	Górnik Polkowice	34	14	9	11	48	40	+8	51	
10	Pniówek Pawłowice	34	15	4	15	42	63	−21	49	
11	Karkonosze Jelenia Góra	34	13	9	12	40	43	−3	48 (Note: Ranked based on head-to-head points: Karkonosze Jelenia Góra 4 pts, Górnik II Zabrze 1 pt.)	
12	Górnik Zabrze II	34	13	9	12	57	44	+13	48	
13	Stilon Gorzów Wielkopolski (R)	34	13	6	15	42	44	−2	45	Relegation to IV liga
14	Podlesianka Katowice (R)	34	10	7	17	51	61	−10	37	Relegation to IV liga
15	Odra Bytom Odrzański (R)	34	8	9	17	42	71	−29	33	Relegation to IV liga
16	Unia Turza Śląska (R)	34	5	6	23	28	73	−45	21	Relegation to IV liga
17	Stal Brzeg (R)	34	3	9	22	26	60	−34	18	Relegation to IV liga
18	Polonia Słubice (R)	34	1	3	30	16	89	−73	6	Relegation to IV liga

Source: 90minut.pl Soccerway
Rules for classification: 1. Number of points reached in the entire series of games; 2. Number of points reached in direct matches; 3. Goal difference in direct matches; 4. Goal difference in direct matches – away goals counted twice; 5. Goal difference in the whole series of games; 6. Number of goals scored in the entire series of games.
(C) Champions; (P) Promoted; (Q) Qualified for the play-offs; (R) Relegated

===== Group 4 =====
Pos	Team	Pld	W	D	L	GF	GA	GD	Pts	Promotion
1	Sandecja Nowy Sącz (C, P)	34	22	8	4	65	31	+34	74	Promotion to II liga
2	Podhale Nowy Targ (Q)	34	21	5	8	67	43	+24	68	Qualification to the promotion play-offs
3	Siarka Tarnobrzeg	34	20	5	9	76	42	+34	65	
4	KSZO Ostrowiec Świętokrzyski	34	19	6	9	55	40	+15	63	
5	Avia Świdnik	34	18	8	8	77	44	+33	62	
6	Korona Kielce II	34	17	10	7	71	50	+21	61	
7	Star Starachowice	34	16	7	11	61	46	+15	55	
8	Podlasie Biała Podlaska	34	15	8	11	59	42	+17	53 (Note: Ranked based on head-to-head points: Podlasie Biała Podlaska 4 pts, Chełmianka Chełm 1 pt.)	
9	Chełmianka Chełm	34	16	5	13	74	62	+12	53	
10	Wisłoka Dębica	34	14	4	16	61	55	+6	46	
11	Czarni Połaniec	34	11	8	15	52	64	−12	41 (Note: Ranked based on head-to-head points: Czarni Połaniec 4 pts, Wisła II Kraków 1 pt.)	
12	Wisła Kraków II	34	11	8	15	72	60	+12	41	
13	Świdniczanka Świdnik	34	10	9	15	44	54	−10	39 (Note: Ranked based on head-to-head difference: Świdniczanka Świdnik -10, Wiślanie Skawina -19.)	
14	Wiślanie Skawina	34	10	9	15	41	60	−19	39	
15	Pogoń-Sokół Lubaczów (R)	34	10	7	17	50	68	−18	37	Relegation to IV liga
16	KS Wiązownica (R)	34	7	9	18	38	70	−32	30	Relegation to IV liga
17	Lewart Lubartów (R)	34	5	4	25	31	85	−54	19	Relegation to IV liga
18	Unia Tarnów (R)	34	2	4	28	28	106	−78	10	Relegation to IV liga

Source: 90minut.pl Soccerway
Rules for classification: 1. Number of points reached in the entire series of games; 2. Number of points reached in direct matches; 3. Goal difference in direct matches; 4. Goal difference in direct matches – away goals counted twice; 5. Goal difference in the whole series of games; 6. Number of goals scored in the entire series of games.
(C) Champions; (P) Promoted; (Q) Qualified for the play-offs; (R) Relegated

=== Cup competitions ===
==== Polish Cup ====
2 May 2025
16:00 CEST (UTC+02:00)

Pogoń Szczecin	3–4	Legia Warsaw
Lončar 41'; Koulouris 67'; Smoliński 90+5'	90minut Łączy nas piłka	Luquinhas 13'; Morishita 46'; Shkurin 64'; Vinagre 85'

PGE Narodowy, Warsaw
Attendance: 51,233
Referee: Szymon Marciniak (Płock)

==== Polish Super Cup ====
2 April 2025
21:00 CEST (UTC+02:00)

Jagiellonia Białystok	1–0	Wisła Kraków
Villar 14'	Report

Stadion Narodowy, Warsaw
Attendance: 10,935
Referee: Jarosław Przybył (Kluczbork)

== UEFA competitions ==
=== UEFA Champions League ===
==== Qualifying phase and play-off round ====
===== Second qualifying round =====
Team 1	Agg.	Team 2	1st leg	2nd leg
Panevėžys (Lithuania)	1–7	(Poland) Jagiellonia Białystok	0–4	1–3

===== Third qualifying round =====
Team 1	Agg.	Team 2	1st leg	2nd leg
Jagiellonia Białystok (Poland)	1–5	(Norway) Bodø/Glimt	0–1	1–4

=== UEFA Europa League ===
==== Qualifying phase and play-off round ====
===== First qualifying round =====
Team 1	Agg.	Team 2	1st leg	2nd leg
Wisła Kraków (Poland)	4–1	(Kosovo) Llapi	2–0	2–1

===== Second qualifying round =====
Team 1	Agg.	Team 2	1st leg	2nd leg
Wisła Kraków (Poland)	2–8	(Austria) Rapid Wien	1–2	1–6

===== Play-off round =====
Team 1	Agg.	Team 2	1st leg	2nd leg
Jagiellonia Białystok (Poland)	1–7	(Netherlands) Ajax	1–4	0–3

=== UEFA Conference League ===
==== Qualifying phase and play-off round ====
===== Second qualifying round =====
Team 1	Agg.	Team 2	1st leg	2nd leg
Legia Warsaw (Poland)	11–0	(Wales) Caernarfon Town	6–0	5–0
Riga (Latvia)	2–3	(Poland) Śląsk Wrocław	1–0	1–3

===== Third qualifying round =====
Team 1	Agg.	Team 2	1st leg	2nd leg
Spartak Trnava (Slovakia)	4–4 (11–12 p)	(Poland) Wisła Kraków	3–1	1–3 (a.e.t.)
Brøndby (Denmark)	3–4	(Poland) Legia Warsaw	2–3	1–1
St. Gallen (Switzerland)	4–3	(Poland) Śląsk Wrocław	2–0	2–3

===== Play-off round =====
Team 1	Agg.	Team 2	1st leg	2nd leg
Legia Warsaw (Poland)	3–0	(Kosovo) Drita	2–0	1–0
Wisła Kraków (Poland)	5–7	(Belgium) Cercle Brugge	1–6	4–1

==== League phase ====
===== Legia Warsaw =====
Pos	Team	Pld	W	D	L	GF	GA	GD	Pts	Qualification
5	(Sweden) Djurgårdens IF	6	4	1	1	11	7	+4	13 (Note: Away goals scored: Djurgårdens IF 5, Lugano 4.)	Advance to round of 16 (seeded)
6	(Switzerland) Lugano	6	4	1	1	11	7	+4	13	Advance to round of 16 (seeded)
7	(Poland) Legia Warsaw	6	4	0	2	13	5	+8	12	Advance to round of 16 (seeded)
8	(Belgium) Cercle Brugge	6	3	2	1	14	7	+7	11	Advance to round of 16 (seeded)
9	(Poland) Jagiellonia Białystok	6	3	2	1	10	5	+5	11	Advance to knockout phase play-offs (seeded)

Source: UEFA
Rules for classification: League phase tiebreakers
Notes:

Home team	Score	Away team
Legia Warsaw (Poland)	1–0	(Spain) Real Betis
TSC (Serbia)	0–3	(Poland) Legia Warsaw
Legia Warsaw (Poland)	4–0	(Belarus) Dinamo Minsk
Omonia (Cyprus)	0–3	(Poland) Legia Warsaw
Legia Warsaw (Poland)	1–2	(Switzerland) Lugano
Djurgårdens IF (Sweden)	3–1	(Poland) Legia Warsaw

===== Jagiellonia Białystok =====
Pos	Team	Pld	W	D	L	GF	GA	GD	Pts	Qualification
7	(Poland) Legia Warsaw	6	4	0	2	13	5	+8	12	Advance to round of 16 (seeded)
8	(Belgium) Cercle Brugge	6	3	2	1	14	7	+7	11	Advance to round of 16 (seeded)
9	(Poland) Jagiellonia Białystok	6	3	2	1	10	5	+5	11	Advance to knockout phase play-offs (seeded)
10	(Republic of Ireland) Shamrock Rovers	6	3	2	1	12	9	+3	11	Advance to knockout phase play-offs (seeded)
11	(Cyprus) APOEL	6	3	2	1	8	5	+3	11	Advance to knockout phase play-offs (seeded)

Source: UEFA
Rules for classification: League phase tiebreakers

Home team	Score	Away team
Copenhagen (Denmark)	1–2	(Poland) Jagiellonia Białystok
Jagiellonia Białystok (Poland)	2–0	(Moldova) Petrocub Hîncești
Jagiellonia Białystok (Poland)	3–0	(Norway) Molde
Celje (Slovenia)	3–3	(Poland) Jagiellonia Białystok
Mladá Boleslav (Czech Republic)	1–0	(Poland) Jagiellonia Białystok
Jagiellonia Białystok (Poland)	0–0	(Slovenia) Olimpija Ljubljana

==== Knockout phase ====
===== Knockout phase play-offs =====
Team 1	Agg.	Team 2	1st leg	2nd leg
TSC (Serbia)	2–6	(Poland) Jagiellonia Białystok	1–3	1–3

===== Round of 16 =====
Team 1	Agg.	Team 2	1st leg	2nd leg
Jagiellonia Białystok (Poland)	3–2	(Belgium) Cercle Brugge	3–0	0–2
Molde (Norway)	3–4	(Poland) Legia Warsaw	3–2	0–2 (a.e.t.)

===== Quarter-finals =====
Team 1	Agg.	Team 2	1st leg	2nd leg
Real Betis (Spain)	3–1	(Poland) Jagiellonia Białystok	2–0	1–1
Legia Warsaw (Poland)	2–4	(England) Chelsea	0–3	2–1

== National teams ==
=== Poland national football team ===
==== Results and fixtures ====
===== Friendlies =====
6 June 2025 Friendly	Poland	2–0	Moldova	Chorzów, Poland
20:45 CEST (UTC+2)	Cash 30'; Slisz 88'	Report		Stadium: Silesian Stadium; Attendance: 36,357; Referee: David Dickinson (Scotland)

===== UEFA Nations League =====
====== Group 1 ======
Pos	Team	Pld	W	D	L	GF	GA	GD	Pts	Qualification or relegation	(Portugal)	(Croatia)	(Scotland)	(Poland)
1	Portugal	6	4	2	0	13	5	+8	14	Advance to quarter-finals	—	2–1	2–1	5–1
2	Croatia	6	2	2	2	8	8	0	8	Advance to quarter-finals	1–1	—	2–1	1–0
3	Scotland (R)	6	2	1	3	7	8	−1	7	Qualification for relegation play-offs	0–0	1–0	—	2–3
4	Poland (R)	6	1	1	4	9	16	−7	4	Relegation to League B	1–3	3–3	1–2	—

Source: UEFA
(R) Relegated

5 September 2024 2024–25 UEFA Nations League	Scotland	2–3	Poland	Glasgow, Scotland
20:45 CEST (UTC+2)	Gilmour 46'; McTominay 76'	Report	S. Szymański 8'; Lewandowski 44' (pen.); Zalewski 90+7' (pen.)	Stadium: Hampden Park; Attendance: 46,356; Referee: Glenn Nyberg (Sweden)

8 September 2024 2024–25 UEFA Nations League	Croatia	1–0	Poland	Osijek, Croatia
20:45 CEST (UTC+2)	Modrić 52'	Report		Stadium: Opus Arena; Attendance: 12,612; Referee: François Letexier (France)

12 October 2024 2024–25 UEFA Nations League	Poland	1–3	Portugal	Warsaw, Poland
20:45 CEST (UTC+2)	Zieliński 78'	Report	Silva 26'; Ronaldo 37'; Bednarek 88' (o.g.)	Stadium: Stadion Narodowy; Attendance: 56,854; Referee: Serdar Gözübüyük (Netherlands)

15 October 2024 2024–25 UEFA Nations League	Poland	3–3	Croatia	Warsaw, Poland
20:45 CEST (UTC+2)	Zieliński 5'; Zalewski 45'; Szymański 68'	Report	Sosa 19'; P. Sučić 24'; Baturina 26'	Stadium: Stadion Narodowy; Attendance: 56,103; Referee: Alejandro Hernández Hernández (Spain)

15 November 2024 2024–25 UEFA Nations League	Portugal	5–1	Poland	Porto, Portugal
20:45 CET (UTC+1)	Leão 59'; Ronaldo 72' (pen.), 87'; Fernandes 80'; Neto 83'	Report	Marczuk 88'	Stadium: Estádio do Dragão; Attendance: 47,239; Referee: Donatas Rumšas (Lithuania)

18 November 2024 2024–25 UEFA Nations League	Poland	1–2	Scotland	Warsaw, Poland
20:45 CET (UTC+1)	Piątkowski 59'	Report	McGinn 3'; Robertson 90+3'	Stadium: Stadion Narodowy; Attendance: 55,433; Referee: Christian Dingert (Germany)

===== 2026 FIFA World Cup qualification =====
====== Group G ======
Pos	Team	Pld	W	D	L	GF	GA	GD	Pts	Qualification	(Finland)	(Netherlands)	(Poland)	(Lithuania)	(Malta)
1	Finland	4	2	1	1	5	5	0	7	Qualification for 2026 FIFA World Cup	—	0–2	2–1	9 Oct	14 Nov
2	Netherlands	2	2	0	0	10	0	+10	6	Advance to play-offs	12 Oct	—	4 Sep	17 Nov	8–0
3	Poland	3	2	0	1	4	2	+2	6		7 Sep	14 Nov	—	1–0	2–0
4	Lithuania	3	0	2	1	2	3	−1	2		2–2	7 Sep	12 Oct	—	4 Sep
5	Malta	4	0	1	3	0	11	−11	1		0–1	9 Oct	17 Nov	0–0	—

Updated to match(es) played on 10 June 2025. Source: FIFA, UEFA

21 March 2025 2026 FIFA World Cup qualification	Poland	1–0	Lithuania	Warsaw, Poland
20:45 CET (UTC+1)	Lewandowski 81'	Report (FIFA); Report (UEFA)		Stadium: Stadion Narodowy; Attendance: 55,738; Referee: Tasos Sidiropoulos (Greece)

24 March 2025 2026 FIFA World Cup qualification	Poland	2–0	Malta	Warsaw, Poland
20:45 CET (UTC+1)	Świderski 27', 51'	Report (FIFA); Report (UEFA)		Stadium: Stadion Narodowy; Attendance: 45,872; Referee: Morten Krogh (Denmark)

10 June 2025 2026 FIFA World Cup qualification	Finland	2–1	Poland	Helsinki, Finland
20:45 CEST (UTC+2)	Pohjanpalo 31' (pen.); Källman 64'	Report (FIFA); Report (UEFA)	Kiwior 69'	Stadium: Helsinki Olympic Stadium; Attendance: 16,511; Referee: Helsinki Olympic Stadium, Helsinki
