= Radosław Seweryś =

Polish footballer

Personal information
- Date of birth: 10 January 2004 (age 22)
- Place of birth: Końskie, Poland
- Height: 1.90 m (6 ft 3 in)
- Position: Defender

Team information
- Current team: Podhale Nowy Targ
- Number: 4

Youth career
- –2019: Korona Kielce

Senior career*
Years	Team	Apps	(Gls)
2019–2026	Korona Kielce II	55	(1)
2020–2025	Korona Kielce	5	(0)
2023–2024	→ Wisła Puławy (loan)	23	(1)
2024	→ Polonia Bytom (loan)	3	(0)
2026–	Podhale Nowy Targ	0	(0)

International career
2017	Poland U14	1	(0)
2019–2020	Poland U16	5	(0)
- * Club domestic league appearances and goals as of 21:07, 29 May 2026 (UTC)

Radosław Seweryś (born 10 January 2004) is a Polish professional footballer who plays as a defender for II liga club Podhale Nowy Targ.

== Career statistics ==
As of match played 8 November 2025

Appearances and goals by club, season and competition
Club	Season	League			Polish Cup		Continental		Other		Total	
Club	Season	Division	Apps	Goals	Apps	Goals	Apps	Goals	Apps	Goals	Apps	Goals
Korona Kielce II	2019–20	III liga, gr. IV	2	0	—		—		—		2	0
Korona Kielce II	2020–21	III liga, gr. IV	19	0	—		—		—		19	0
Korona Kielce II	2021–22	IV liga Św.	20	1	—		—		—		20	1
Korona Kielce II	2022–23	III liga, gr. IV	10	0	—		—		—		10	0
Korona Kielce II	2024–25	III liga, gr. IV	1	0	—		—		—		1	0
Korona Kielce II	2025–26	III liga, gr. IV	3	0	0	0	—		—		3	0
Korona Kielce II	Total		55	1	0	0	—		—		55	1
Korona Kielce	2019–20	Ekstraklasa	1	0	0	0	—		—		1	0
Korona Kielce	2020–21	I liga	3	0	0	0	—		—		3	0
Korona Kielce	2021–22	I liga	1	0	0	0	—		—		1	0
Korona Kielce	2022–23	Ekstraklasa	0	0	1	0	—		—		1	0
Korona Kielce	2024–25	Ekstraklasa	0	0	0	0	—		—		1	0
Korona Kielce	Total		5	0	1	0	—		—		6	0
Wisła Puławy (loan)	2023–24	II liga	23	1	1	0	—		—		24	1
Polonia Bytom (loan)	2024–25	II liga	3	0	0	0	—		—		3	0
Podhale Nowy Targ	2026–27	II liga	0	0	0	0	—		—		0	0
Career total			86	2	2	0	0	0	0	0	88	2

== Honours ==
Korona Kielce II

- IV liga Świętokrzyskie: 2021–22
