= Bartłomiej Eizenchart =

Polish footballer

Personal information
- Full name: Bartłomiej Eizenchart
- Date of birth: 23 August 2001 (age 25)
- Place of birth: Łęczyca, Poland
- Height: 1.82 m (6 ft 0 in)
- Positions: Left-back; left winger

Team information
- Current team: Unia Skierniewice

Youth career
- Górnik Łęczyca
- 2013–2018: UKS SMS Łódź
- 2018: → Pogoń Szczecin (loan)

Senior career*
Years	Team	Apps	(Gls)
2018–2022	Górnik Zabrze II	27	(0)
2019–2022	Górnik Zabrze	0	(0)
2020	→ Puszcza Niepołomice (loan)	9	(0)
2020	→ GKS Bełchatów (loan)	16	(1)
2021–2022	→ Resovia (loan)	28	(2)
2022–2025	Resovia	81	(7)
2025–2026	Chojniczanka Chojnice	32	(4)
2026–	Unia Skierniewice	0	(0)

International career
2017	Poland U16	4	(0)
2017–2018	Poland U17	10	(1)
2021	Poland U20	4	(0)
- * Club domestic league appearances and goals as of 11:08, 31 May 2026 (UTC)

Bartłomiej Eizenchart (born 23 August 2001) is a Polish professional footballer who plays as a left-back or left winger for I liga club Unia Skierniewice.

== Career statistics ==
As of match played 30 May 2026

Appearances and goals by club, season and competition
Club	Season	League			Polish Cup		Europe		Other		Total	
Club	Season	Division	Apps	Goals	Apps	Goals	Apps	Goals	Apps	Goals	Apps	Goals
Górnik Zabrze II	2018–19	III liga, gr. III	7	0	—		—		—		7	0
Górnik Zabrze II	2019–20	III liga, gr. III	17	0	—		—		—		17	0
Górnik Zabrze II	2022–23	III liga, gr. III	3	0	—		—		—		3	0
Górnik Zabrze II	Total		27	0	—		—		—		27	0
Puszcza Niepołomice (loan)	2019–20	I liga	9	0	—		—		—		9	0
GKS Bełchatów (loan)	2020–21	I liga	16	1	1	0	—		—		17	1
Resovia (loan)	2021–22	I liga	28	2	0	0	—		—		28	2
Resovia	2022–23	I liga	23	1	1	0	—		—		24	1
Resovia	2023–24	I liga	30	2	2	0	—		—		32	2
Resovia	2024–25	II liga	28	4	2	0	—		—		30	4
Resovia	Total		81	7	5	0	—		—		86	7
Chojniczanka Chojnice	2025–26	II liga	32	4	5	1	—		—		37	5
Unia Skierniewice	2026–27	I liga	0	0	0	0	—		—		0	0
Career total			193	14	11	1	—		—		204	15
