= 2025–26 II liga =

II liga
- Season: 2025–26
- Dates: 25 July 2025 – 9 June 2026
- Champions: Unia Skierniewice
- Promoted: Unia Skierniewice; Warta Poznań; Podbeskidzie Bielsko-Biała
- Relegated: Zagłębie Sosnowiec; KKS 1925 Kalisz; ŁKS Łódź II; GKS Jastrzębie
- Matches: 296
- Goals: 871 (2.94 per match)
- Top goalscorer: Kamil Sabiłło (20 goals)
- Biggest home win: Olimpia 7–1 Zagłębie (15 March 2026)
- Biggest away win: Rekord 0–5 Chojniczanka (16 November 2025); Śląsk II 0–5 Podbeskidzie (21 February 2026)
- Highest scoring: Olimpia 7–1 Zagłębie (15 March 2026)
- Longest winning run: 7 matches Unia Skierniewice; Warta Poznań
- Longest unbeaten run: 16 matches Unia Skierniewice
- Longest winless run: 34 matches GKS Jastrzębie
- Longest losing run: 15 matches GKS Jastrzębie
- Highest attendance: 8,111; Sandecja 1–1 Chojniczanka (31 August 2025)
- Lowest attendance: 0 (Note: Two games hosted by Sandecja Nowy Sącz and two games hosted by ŁKS Łódź II were played behind closed doors without any spectators.); 4 matches
- Total attendance: 389,163
- Average attendance: 1,315 ▲35.8%

The 2025–26 II liga (also known as Betclic II liga for sponsorship reasons) was the 78th season of the third tier domestic division in the Polish football league system since its establishment in 1948 and the 18th season of the Polish II liga under its current title. The league was operated by the PZPN.

The league was contested by 18 teams. The regular season was played in a round-robin tournament. The season started on 25 July 2025 and concluded on 30 May 2026 (regular season), with play-offs being held in June 2026.

== Teams ==
A total of 18 teams participated in the 2025–26 II liga season.

=== Changes from last season ===
The following teams have changed division since the 2024–25 season.

==== To II liga ====
Relegated from 2024–25 I liga	Promoted from 2024–25 III liga
▼ Warta Poznań (17th) ▼ Stal Stalowa Wola (18th)	▲ Unia Skierniewice (Group I) ▲ Sokół Kleczew (Group II) ▲ Śląsk Wrocław II (Group III) ▲ Sandecja Nowy Sącz (Group IV) ▲ Podhale Nowy Targ (RPO)

==== From II liga ====
Promoted to 2025–26 I liga	Relegated to 2025–26 III liga	Relegated to 2025–26 Klasa A
▲ Polonia Bytom (1st) ▲ Pogoń Grodzisk Mazowiecki (2nd) ▲ Wieczysta Kraków (PO)	▼ Zagłębie Lubin II (RPO) ▼ Skra Częstochowa (17th) ▼ Olimpia Elbląg (18th)	▼ Wisła Puławy (15th)

=== Stadiums and locations ===
Location of teams in 2025–26 II liga.

Note: Table lists in alphabetical order.

Team	Location	Venue	Capacity
Chojniczanka Chojnice	Chojnice	Chojniczanka 1930 Municipal Stadium	2,923
GKS Jastrzębie	Jastrzębie-Zdrój	Jastrzębie-Zdrój Municipal Stadium	5,650
Hutnik Kraków	Kraków	Suche Stawy Stadium	6,000
KKS 1925 Kalisz	Kalisz	OSRiR Stadium	8,166
ŁKS Łódź II	Łódź	Władysław Król Municipal Stadium	18,029
Olimpia Grudziądz	Grudziądz	Bronisław Malinowski Stadium	5,323
Podbeskidzie Bielsko-Biała	Bielsko-Biała	BBOSiR Stadium	15,316
Podhale Nowy Targ	Nowy Targ	Marshal Józef Piłsudski Stadium	900
Rekord Bielsko-Biała	Bielsko-Biała	Centrum Sportu REKORD	593
Resovia Rzeszów	Rzeszów	Stal Stadium^{1}	11,547
Sandecja Nowy Sącz	Nowy Sącz	Sandecja Stadium	8,111^{2}
Sokół Kleczew	Kleczew	OSiR Stadium	800
Stal Stalowa Wola	Stalowa Wola	Subcarpathian Football Center	3,764
Śląsk Wrocław II	Wrocław	Oporowska Stadium	8,346
Świt Szczecin	Szczecin	Obiekt Sportowy Skolwin	974
Unia Skierniewice	Skierniewice	Municipal Stadium	3,000
Warta Poznań	Poznań	Ogródek by TedGifted.com	1,600
Zagłębie Sosnowiec	Sosnowiec	ArcelorMittal Park	11,600

1. Due to the renovation of the Resovia Stadium in Rzeszów, Resovia play their home games at the Stal Stadium.
2. The stadium was opened at full capacity on 31 August 2025.

=== Managerial changes ===
Team	Outgoing manager	Manner of departure	Date of vacancy	Position in table	Incoming manager	Date of appointment
Warta Poznań	(Poland) Ryszard Tarasiewicz	Mutual consent	10 June 2025	Pre-season	(Poland) Maciej Tokarczyk	25 June 2025
Zagłębie Sosnowiec	(Poland) Bartłomiej Bobla	End of contract	30 June 2025	Pre-season	(Poland) Marek Gołębiewski	1 July 2025
GKS Jastrzębie	(Slovakia) Peter Struhár	End of contract	30 June 2025	Pre-season	(Poland) Maciej Tarnogrodzki	5 July 2025
Zagłębie Sosnowiec	(Poland) Marek Gołębiewski	Mutual consent	7 September 2025	15th	(Poland) Wojciech Łobodziński	8 September 2025
Chojniczanka Chojnice	(Poland) Damian Nowak	Sacked	17 September 2025	16th	(Poland) Marek Brzozowski	19 September 2025
GKS Jastrzębie	(Poland) Maciej Tarnogrodzki	Mutual consent	22 September 2025	18th	(Poland) Marcin Radzewicz	22 September 2025
GKS Jastrzębie	(Poland) Marcin Radzewicz	End of caretaker spell	25 September 2025	18th	(Poland) Krzysztof Górecko	25 September 2025
Podbeskidzie Bielsko-Biała	(Poland) Krzysztof Brede	Sacked	5 October 2025	10th	(Poland) Tomasz Pawliczak	6 October 2025
KKS 1925 Kalisz	(Poland) Michał Gościniak	Sacked	6 October 2025	14th	(Poland) Bartosz Sieroń	10 October 2025
KKS 1925 Kalisz	(Poland) Bartosz Sieroń	End of caretaker spell	14 October 2025	11th	(Poland) Damian Nowak	14 October 2025
Stal Stalowa Wola	(Poland) Marcin Płuska	Sacked	14 October 2025	9th	(Poland) Maciej Musiał	15 October 2025
Sandecja Nowy Sącz	(Poland) Łukasz Mierzejewski	Sacked	22 October 2025	7th	(Slovakia) Ján Fröhlich	22 October 2025
Sandecja Nowy Sącz	(Slovakia) Ján Fröhlich	End of caretaker spell	28 October 2025	9th	(Poland) Rafał Smalec	28 October 2025
Podbeskidzie Bielsko-Biała	(Poland) Tomasz Pawliczak	End of caretaker spell	5 November 2025	14th	(Poland) Marcin Włodarski	5 November 2025
Resovia	(Poland) Piotr Kołc	Sacked	24 November 2025	12th	(Poland) Paweł Młynarczyk (Note: Młynarczyk was initially appointed as caretaker coach, but the move was made permanent on 11 December 2025.)	24 November 2025
Rekord Bielsko-Biała	(Poland) Dariusz Rucki	Sacked	20 December 2025	15th	(Poland) Piotr Tworek	23 December 2025
Zagłębie Sosnowiec	(Poland) Wojciech Łobodziński	Sacked	16 March 2026	14th	(Poland) Grzegorz Bąk (Note: Bąk was initially appointed as caretaker coach, but the move was made permanent on 29 March 2026.)	16 March 2026
GKS Jastrzębie	(Poland) Krzysztof Górecko	Mutual consent	31 March 2026	18th	Club withdrawn from competition	
Świt Szczecin	(Poland) Tomasz Kafarski	Sacked	31 March 2026	6th	(Poland) Patryk Kurant	31 March 2026
KKS 1925 Kalisz	(Poland) Damian Nowak	Sacked	8 April 2026	16th	(Poland) Artur Derbin	10 April 2026
Zagłębie Sosnowiec	(Poland) Grzegorz Bąk	Sacked	17 April 2026	15th	(Poland) Tomasz Łuczywek	19 April 2026
Resovia	(Poland) Paweł Młynarczyk	Sacked	21 April 2026	11th	(Poland) Kamil Kuzera	21 April 2026
Świt Szczecin	(Poland) Patryk Kurant	Sacked	21 April 2026	9th	(Poland) Marcin Sasal	21 April 2026
Stal Stalowa Wola	(Poland) Maciej Musiał	Sacked	27 April 2026	13th	(Poland) Dariusz Kantor	28 April 2026

- Italics for interim managers.

== League table ==
Pos	Team	Pld	W	D	L	GF	GA	GD	Pts	Promotion or Relegation
1	Unia Skierniewice (C, P)	34	21	5	8	69	45	+24	68	Promotion to I liga
2	Warta Poznań (P)	34	17	13	4	57	37	+20	64 (Note: Head-to-head points: Warta Poznań 6, Olimpia Grudziądz 0.)	Promotion to I liga
3	Olimpia Grudziądz	34	18	10	6	69	42	+27	64	Qualification for the promotion play-offs
4	Podbeskidzie Bielsko-Biała (O, P)	34	17	7	10	64	43	+21	58	Qualification for the promotion play-offs
5	Śląsk Wrocław II	34	16	7	11	65	49	+16	55 (Note: Tied on head-to-head points and goal difference. Overall goal difference: Śląsk Wrocław II +16, Sandecja Nowy Sącz +14.)	Qualification for the promotion play-offs
6	Sandecja Nowy Sącz	34	14	13	7	54	40	+14	55	Qualification for the promotion play-offs
7	Podhale Nowy Targ	34	13	14	7	46	35	+11	53	
8	Chojniczanka Chojnice	34	14	10	10	58	47	+11	52	
9	Rekord Bielsko-Biała	34	12	10	12	45	48	−3	46 (Note: Head-to-head points: Rekord Bielsko-Biała 6, Stal Stalowa Wola 5, Hutnik Kraków 3.)	
10	Stal Stalowa Wola	34	10	16	8	56	43	+13	46	
11	Hutnik Kraków	34	12	10	12	47	40	+7	46	
12	Świt Szczecin	34	12	8	14	51	59	−8	44	
13	Resovia Rzeszów (O)	34	10	12	12	48	47	+1	42	Qualification for the relegation play-offs
14	Sokół Kleczew (O)	34	10	7	17	47	62	−15	37	Qualification for the relegation play-offs
15	Zagłębie Sosnowiec (R)	34	9	7	18	37	61	−24	34 (Note: Head-to-head points: Zagłębie Sosnowiec 4, KKS 1925 Kalisz 1.)	Relegation to III liga
16	KKS 1925 Kalisz (R)	34	8	10	16	37	55	−18	34	Relegation to III liga
17	ŁKS Łódź II (R)	34	5	10	19	33	64	−31	25	Relegation to III liga
18	GKS Jastrzębie (Note: GKS Jastrzębie were deducted 1 point due to financial arrears. GKS Jastrzębie has withdrawn from the competition after 24th round.) (R)	34	0	7	27	18	84	−66	6	Withdrawn from the league

Source: 90minut.pl
Rules for classification: 1) Points; 2) Head-to-head points; 3) Head-to-head goal difference; 4) Goal difference; 6) Goals scored; 7) Number of wins; 8) Number of away wins.
(Note: Head-to-head record is used only after all the matches between the teams in question have been played)
(C) Champions; (O) Play-off winner; (P) Promoted; (R) Relegated

== Positions by round ==
Team ╲ Round	1	2	3	4	5	6	7	8	9	10	11	12	13	14	15	16	17	18	19	20	21	22	23	24	25	26	27	28	29	30	31	32	33	34
Unia Skierniewice	5	10	4	7	9	6	8	3	8	3	3	2	2	1	1	1	1	1	1	1	1	1	1	1	1	1	1	1	1	1	1	1	1	1
Warta Poznań	12	17	16	17	16	17	13	11	9	6	5	3	3	3	3	3	2	2	2	2	3	3	3	2	3	3	3	3	2	2	2	2	2	2
Olimpia Grudziądz	8	7	9	8	6	8	9	5	1	1	1	1	1	2	2	2	3	3	4	3	2	2	2	3	2	2	2	2	3	3	3	3	3	3
Podbeskidzie Bielsko-Biała	15	18	18	14	10	10	11	10	6	10	11	13	11	12	14	11	12	13	8	7	7	7	8	8	7	7	8	7	6	6	5	4	4	4
Śląsk Wrocław II	12	12	14	16	16	12	10	12	10	12	13	14	15	11	12	9	7	7	9	11	10	8	7	7	8	9	9	6	7	7	7	6	6	5
Sandecja Nowy Sącz	4	6	4	1	2	3	4	7	5	8	6	6	7	9	10	7	8	9	11	12	6	6	5	4	4	4	4	5	5	5	6	7	7	6
Podhale Nowy Targ	2	4	3	4	5	5	1	2	4	2	2	4	4	4	4	4	4	4	3	4	4	4	4	5	5	5	5	4	4	4	4	5	5	7
Chojniczanka Chojnice	8	7	12	13	13	14	14	15	17	16	16	16	16	16	13	14	11	8	10	10	11	10	11	10	9	8	6	8	8	8	8	8	8	8
Rekord Bielsko-Biała	5	7	9	6	6	10	12	14	15	14	15	12	9	10	9	12	13	14	15	15	14	13	15	15	14	14	13	12	12	9	11	11	10	9
Stal Stalowa Wola	8	2	2	3	4	7	2	1	2	4	8	9	6	8	8	6	6	6	6	8	9	11	12	12	13	10	12	13	13	13	12	12	12	10
Hutnik Kraków	1	3	7	5	1	1	3	6	3	7	9	10	14	14	15	15	15	15	14	14	13	15	13	11	12	12	11	10	11	12	9	9	9	11
Świt Szczecin	17	14	15	10	8	2	6	9	13	15	10	7	8	7	6	5	5	5	5	5	5	5	6	6	6	6	7	9	9	10	10	10	11	12
Resovia Rzeszów	8	1	1	2	3	4	7	4	7	5	4	5	5	6	5	10	10	12	7	6	8	9	9	13	10	11	10	11	10	11	13	13	13	13
Sokół Kleczew	12	12	8	12	12	15	16	16	14	11	12	15	13	13	11	13	14	11	12	9	12	14	10	9	11	13	14	14	14	14	14	14	14	14
Zagłębie Sosnowiec	5	11	13	15	15	13	15	13	12	9	7	8	10	5	7	8	9	10	13	13	15	12	14	14	15	15	15	15	15	16	16	16	15	15
KKS 1925 Kalisz	2	4	6	11	11	9	5	8	11	13	14	11	12	15	16	16	16	16	16	16	16	16	16	16	16	16	16	16	16	15	15	15	16	16
ŁKS Łódź II	16	14	11	9	14	16	17	17	16	17	17	17	17	17	17	17	17	17	17	17	17	17	17	17	17	17	17	17	17	17	17	17	17	17
GKS Jastrzębie	17	16	17	18	18	18	18	18	18	18	18	18	18	18	18	18	18	18	18	18	18	18	18	18	18	18	18	18	18	18	18	18	18	18

Promotion to I liga
Qualification for promotion play-offs
Qualification for relegation play-offs
Relegation to II liga

Source: 90minut.pl

== Results ==
Home \ Away	CHO	JAS	HUT	KAL	ŁKS	OLI	PBB	PNT	REK	RES	SAN	SOK	STA	ŚLĄ	ŚWI	UNI	WAR	ZAG
Chojniczanka Chojnice	—	3–0 (w/o)	2–1	3–3	0–1	2–2	0–1	0–0	2–0	2–0	0–1	1–4	3–3	2–4	2–1	1–2	2–1	3–1
GKS Jastrzębie	1–1	—	0–2	0–1	1–1	0–3 (w/o)	2–2	0–3	0–3 (w/o)	1–2	2–3	1–2	1–5	0–3 (w/o)	0–1	0–3 (w/o)	1–1	0–3 (w/o)
Hutnik Kraków	1–1	3–0	—	4–0	4–1	2–2	1–0	1–0	2–2	1–3	2–1	2–0	0–1	1–0	1–3	1–1	0–1	0–0
KKS 1925 Kalisz	0–1	3–0 (w/o)	1–3	—	1–0	0–3	0–1	2–2	2–1	0–0	1–2	1–1	1–1	1–2	3–4	2–1	0–2	1–1
ŁKS Łódź II	3–1	1–1	2–0	2–0	—	2–4	1–4	1–1	0–3	0–0	2–2	1–2	0–2	1–4	1–1	1–3	0–0	1–3
Olimpia Grudziądz	2–1	3–0	2–2	3–1	2–0	—	2–1	0–1	2–0	2–1	1–0	2–1	1–1	3–2	1–1	1–2	2–4	7–1
Podbeskidzie Bielsko-Biała	2–2	3–0 (w/o)	3–3	4–1	1–0	1–1	—	2–1	2–3	3–0	1–3	3–0	3–1	0–0	1–0	3–0	2–3	2–0
Podhale Nowy Targ	3–2	3–0	1–0	1–1	1–0	1–2	2–0	—	3–2	2–1	1–1	4–0	1–1	0–2	3–1	1–0	2–2	1–1
Rekord Bielsko-Biała	0–5	2–2	0–0	0–1	1–0	2–2	2–1	1–1	—	2–1	1–1	2–1	1–0	1–1	1–0	0–2	2–2	1–2
Resovia Rzeszów	1–1	3–0 (w/o)	2–0	0–1	3–0	1–1	1–1	1–1	1–0	—	0–2	1–1	2–2	2–3	3–1	1–2	0–2	3–0
Sandecja Nowy Sącz	1–1	5–0	1–0	1–1	4–1	1–3	0–0	0–0	1–0	2–2	—	2–1	2–3	0–4	2–2	1–3	1–1	1–0
Sokół Kleczew	0–2	2–1	2–0	0–0	2–2	1–0	5–2	2–2	0–1	2–2	2–5	—	1–1	0–2	3–0	1–3	1–3	1–2
Stal Stalowa Wola	2–3	3–0 (w/o)	2–2	1–0	1–1	2–2	5–2	0–0	1–1	1–1	0–0	3–0	—	0–1	5–2	2–2	0–1	2–0
Śląsk Wrocław II	1–2	2–2	1–1	3–2	4–1	1–0	0–5	0–1	1–2	5–0	0–4	2–4	3–2	—	2–2	2–0	0–1	1–1
Świt Szczecin	2–2	3–1	1–4	0–3	3–1	0–1	0–2	3–0	3–2	1–2	2–0	3–1	0–0	4–3	—	2–3	1–1	2–1
Unia Skierniewice	2–3	2–0	2–0	1–1	3–1	1–2	1–4	3–3	5–1	2–1	2–2	2–0	3–2	2–1	1–2	—	2–1	3–2
Warta Poznań	1–0	3–1	2–1	4–2	2–2	3–2	1–2	2–0	1–1	2–2	0–0	3–2	3–1	1–1	0–0	0–2	—	1–0
Zagłębie Sosnowiec	0–2	1–0	0–2	3–0	0–2	3–3	2–0	1–0	0–4	1–5	1–2	1–2	0–0	1–4	3–0	0–3	2–2	—

Source: 90minut.pl
Legend: Blue = home team win; Yellow = draw; Red = away team win.
For upcoming matches, an "a" indicates there is an article about the rivalry between the two participants.

== Results by round ==
Team ╲ Round	1	2	3	4	5	6	7	8	9	10	11	12	13	14	15	16	17	18	19	20	21	22	23	24	25	26	27	28	29	30	31	32	33	34
Chojniczanka Chojnice	D	W	L	L	D	D	D	L	L	D	W	L	W	D	W	L	W	W	L	D	W	L	L	W	W	W	W	D	D	D	L	W	W	W
GKS Jastrzębie	L	D	L	L	L	D	D	L	L	L	L	L	L	D	D	L	D	L	D	L	L	L	L	L	L	L	L	L	L	L	L	L	L	L
Hutnik Kraków	W	D	L	W	W	D	L	W	D	L	L	L	L	D	L	D	D	L	W	L	W	L	W	W	D	D	W	W	D	L	W	W	D	L
KKS 1925 Kalisz	W	D	L	L	D	W	W	L	D	L	L	W	D	L	L	D	D	L	D	L	L	L	D	W	L	D	L	D	W	W	L	L	L	W
ŁKS Łódź II	L	D	W	D	L	L	L	D	D	L	L	D	L	L	L	L	W	D	D	D	L	W	W	L	L	L	W	D	L	L	D	L	L	L
Olimpia Grudziądz	D	W	L	D	W	D	W	W	W	W	W	L	W	D	W	D	D	D	L	W	W	L	W	D	W	W	W	L	L	D	W	W	D	W
Podbeskidzie Bielsko-Biała	L	L	D	W	W	D	W	L	W	L	L	W	L	D	L	W	L	D	W	W	D	W	L	D	W	W	L	W	W	W	W	W	D	W
Podhale Nowy Targ	W	D	W	D	D	D	W	D	D	W	W	L	D	D	W	L	W	W	W	L	D	L	W	D	D	L	W	D	W	D	W	L	D	L
Rekord Bielsko-Biała	W	D	L	W	D	L	L	L	D	W	L	W	W	D	D	L	L	D	L	W	D	L	D	L	W	D	W	W	D	W	L	W	W	L
Resovia Rzeszów	D	W	W	D	D	D	L	W	L	W	W	D	D	L	D	L	L	L	W	W	L	D	L	L	W	D	W	L	W	L	L	D	D	D
Sandecja Nowy Sącz	W	D	W	W	L	D	L	D	W	L	W	D	L	D	L	W	D	L	W	W	W	W	D	W	D	D	D	D	W	D	D	L	W	W
Sokół Kleczew	L	D	W	L	D	L	D	W	L	W	L	L	W	D	W	L	W	D	D	L	D	W	W	L	L	L	L	W	L	L	L	L	L	W
Stal Stalowa Wola	D	W	W	D	D	L	W	W	D	L	L	L	W	D	D	W	D	D	L	D	L	L	D	D	D	W	L	D	D	D	W	D	W	W
Śląsk Wrocław II	L	D	D	D	L	W	W	L	W	L	L	L	W	W	D	W	D	D	L	L	W	W	W	W	L	W	D	W	L	W	W	L	W	W
Świt Szczecin	L	D	D	W	W	W	L	L	L	D	W	W	L	W	D	W	D	W	W	L	W	L	D	D	L	W	L	L	L	L	D	W	L	L
Unia Skierniewice	W	L	W	L	D	W	L	W	L	W	W	W	W	W	W	W	D	W	W	W	W	W	W	D	D	L	D	L	W	W	W	W	L	L
Warta Poznań	L	L	D	D	D	D	W	W	W	W	W	W	W	D	W	W	W	L	W	D	D	W	D	D	W	W	D	L	W	W	D	W	D	D
Zagłębie Sosnowiec	W	L	L	D	D	D	L	W	W	W	W	L	W	D	L	D	L	L	L	L	W	L	L	D	L	L	L	W	L	D	L	L	W	L

Source: 90minut.pl
W = Win; D = Draw; L = Loss

== Promotion play-offs ==
The promotion play-offs were played on 2 and 6 June 2026, between the teams that finished in 3rd, 4th, 5th and 6th place. The fixtures were determined by final league position – 3rd team of the regular season played against 6th team of the regular season and 4th team of the regular season played against 5th team of the regular season. The winner of the final match, Podbeskidzie Bielsko-Biała, was promoted to the I liga for the 2026–27 season. All matches were played in a stadiums of team which occupied higher position in the regular season.

Semi-finals; 2 June 2026
3	Olimpia Grudziądz	1
6	Sandecja Nowy Sącz	2
4	Podbeskidzie Bielsko-Biała	2
5	Śląsk Wrocław II	1

Final; 6 June 2026
6	Sandecja Nowy Sącz	1
4	Podbeskidzie Bielsko-Biała	3

=== Matches ===
==== Semi-finals ====
2 June 2026
13:00 CEST (UTC+02:00)

Podbeskidzie Bielsko-Biała	2–1	Śląsk Wrocław II
Urynowicz 49', 76'	Report	Milewski 2'

BBOSiR Stadium, Bielsko-Biała
Attendance: 2,159
Referee: Łukasz Kuźma (Białystok)
2 June 2026
16:00 CEST (UTC+02:00)

Olimpia Grudziądz	1–2	Sandecja Nowy Sącz
Frelek 69'	Report	Kołbon 60'; Pleśnierowicz 90+3'

Bronisław Malinowski Stadium, Grudziądz
Attendance: 765
Referee: Paweł Malec (Łódź)

==== Final ====
6 June 2026
13:45 CEST (UTC+02:00)

Podbeskidzie Bielsko-Biała	3–1	Sandecja Nowy Sącz
Klisiewicz 5' (pen.); Sochań 67'; Takáč 80'	Report	Pietraszkiewicz 84'

BBOSiR Stadium, Bielsko-Biała
Attendance: 9,418
Referee: Paweł Raczkowski (Warsaw)

== Relegation play-offs ==
The relegation play-offs were played on 3, 6 and 9 June 2026. The semi-finals were played over a single leg between runners-up of each III liga group. The winner of each semi-final would advance to the final, played over two legs against a 13th or a 14th-placed II liga team. The winners of the final would earn or keep the right to compete in the II liga the following season. The final matches were hosted by the winners of the semi-finals.

Semi-finals; 3 June 2026
2 (Group IV)	KSZO Ostrowiec Świętokrzyski	2
2 (Group II)	Wikęd Luzino	1
2 (Group I)	ŁKS Łomża	2
2 (Group III)	Górnik Polkowice	3

Final; 6 and 9 June 2026
2 (Group IV)	KSZO Ostrowiec Świętokrzyski	0	0	0
13	Resovia Rzeszów	1	3	4
2 (Group III)	Górnik Polkowice	1	1	2
14	Sokół Kleczew	0	4	4

=== Matches ===
==== Semi-finals ====
3 June 2026
19:26 CEST (UTC+02:00)

ŁKS Łomża	2–3	Górnik Polkowice
Stromecki 48'; Klupś 90'	Report	Żendełek 26', 74'; Skrzypczak 53'

Stadion Miejski, Łomża
Attendance: 1,653
Referee: Damian Krumplewski (Olsztyn)
3 June 2026
19:29 CEST (UTC+02:00)

KSZO Ostrowiec Świętokrzyski	2–1	Wikęd Luzino
Łazarz 63' (pen.); Lis 69'	Report	Sosnowski 36'

Stadion Miejski, Ostrowiec Świętokrzyski
Attendance: 5,012
Referee: Patryk Świerczek (Brzesko)

==== Final ====
===== First leg =====
6 June 2026
17:00 CEST (UTC+02:00)

Górnik Polkowice	1–0	Sokół Kleczew
Wireński 31'	Report

Stadion Miejski, Polkowice
Attendance: 190
Referee: Mateusz Piszczelok (Katowice)
6 June 2026
17:00 CEST (UTC+02:00)

KSZO Ostrowiec Świętokrzyski	0–1	Resovia Rzeszów
	Report	Czyżycki 44'

Stadion Miejski, Ostrowiec Świętokrzyski
Attendance: 6,592
Referee: Sebastian Krasny (Kraków)

===== Second leg =====
9 June 2026
17:30 CEST (UTC+02:00)

Sokół Kleczew	4–1 (a.e.t.)	Górnik Polkowice
Retlewski 75'; Dudziński 81'; Śliwa 94' (pen.), 120' (pen.)	Report	Leopold 89'

Stadion Miejski, Kleczew
Referee: Patryk Gryckiewicz (Toruń)
9 June 2026
19:00 CEST (UTC+02:00)

Resovia Rzeszów	3–0	KSZO Ostrowiec Świętokrzyski
Geniec 7'; Zimnicki 29'; Bałdyga 51'	Report

Stal Stadium, Rzeszów
Referee: Wojciech Myć (Lublin)

== Season statistics ==
=== Top goalscorers ===
Rank	Player	Club	Goals
1	(Poland) Kamil Sabiłło	Unia Skierniewice	20
2	(Latvia) Valērijs Šabala	Chojniczanka Chojnice	19
3	(Poland) Oskar Kubiak	Sokół Kleczew	14
3	(Poland) Kacper Prusiński	Hutnik Kraków	14
5	(Poland) Dominik Frelek	Olimpia Grudziądz	13
5	(Poland) Lucjan Klisiewicz	Podbeskidzie Bielsko-Biała	13
7	(Poland) Jan Ciućka	Rekord Bielsko-Biała	12
8	(Poland) Bartosz Kurzeja	Podhale Nowy Targ	11
8	(Poland) Krzysztof Ropski	Świt Szczecin	11
8	(Poland) Dawid Wolny	Stal Stalowa Wola	11

=== Hat-tricks ===
Player	For	Against	Result	Date	Ref
(Poland) Maksymilian Hebel	Stal Stalowa Wola	Świt Szczecin	5–2 (H)	7 September 2025	
(Poland) Wiktor Niewiarowski	Śląsk Wrocław II	Sandecja Nowy Sącz	4–0 (A)	21 October 2025	
(Poland) Oskar Kubiak	Sokół Kleczew	Podbeskidzie Bielsko-Biała	5–2 (H)	31 October 2025	

== Attendances ==
Pos	Team	Total	High	Low	Average	Change
1	Sandecja Nowy Sącz	106,192	8,111	0	6,247	n/a^{2}
2	Zagłębie Sosnowiec	50,400	4,928	2,031	2,965	−43.1%
3	Stal Stalowa Wola	37,152	3,764	1,530	2,322	−14.9%^{1}
4	Podbeskidzie Bielsko-Biała	33,941	5,500	908	2,121	+1.9%
5	Unia Skierniewice	33,746	3,000	1,485	1,985	n/a^{2}
6	Resovia Rzeszów	14,340	3,388	343	896	+15.2%
7	Chojniczanka Chojnice	14,192	1,415	543	887	−7.0%
8	Warta Poznań	14,308	1,778	91	842	+4.3%^{1}
9	Hutnik Kraków	13,547	997	595	797	+4.3%
10	Rekord Bielsko-Biała	11,677	4,900	181	687	−12.1%
11	GKS Jastrzębie	8,198	893	385	683	−22.6%
12	Podhale Nowy Targ	10,821	829	350	637	n/a^{2}
13	Olimpia Grudziądz	9,367	895	345	551	+31.8%
14	Sokół Kleczew	8,809	800	198	518	n/a^{2}
15	KKS 1925 Kalisz	8,058	1,200	222	504	−26.2%
16	Świt Szczecin	7,436	928	141	437	−16.1%
17	Śląsk Wrocław II	4,195	369	103	247	n/a^{2}
18	ŁKS Łódź II	2,784	274	0	164	−47.6%
	League total	389,163	8,111	0	1,315	+35.8%

Source: 90minut.pl
Notes:
1. Team played last season in I liga.
2. Team played last season in III liga.

== See also ==
- 2025–26 Ekstraklasa
- 2025–26 I liga
- 2025–26 III liga
- 2025–26 Polish Cup
- 2025 Polish Super Cup
