= 2024–25 III liga =

III liga
- Season: 2024–25
- Dates: 2 August 2024 – 7 June 2025
- Champions: Unia Skierniewice (group I); Sokół Kleczew (group II); Śląsk Wrocław II (group III); Sandecja Nowy Sącz (group IV)
- Promoted: Unia Skierniewice; Sokół Kleczew; Śląsk Wrocław II; Sandecja Nowy Sącz; Podhale Nowy Targ
- Matches: 1,224
- Goals: 3,794 (3.1 per match)
- Top goalscorer: Rafał Wolsztyński (25 goals)

The 2024–25 III liga (also known as Betclic III liga for sponsorship reasons) was the 17th season of the fourth tier domestic division in the Polish football league system since its establishment in 2008 under its current title (III liga) and the 8th season under its current league division format. The league is operated by the Polish Football Association (PZPN).

The competition was contested by 72 clubs split geographically across 4 groups of 18 teams, with the winners of each group gaining promotion to the II liga. The season was played in a round-robin tournament. It began in August 2024 and concluded in June 2025. The teams included semi-professional clubs (although a few are professional) and the reserve teams of professional clubs. From this season onwards, promotion/relegation play-offs will be played, with two second-placed teams facing teams placed 13th and 14th from the II liga.

== Changes from last season ==
The following teams have changed division since the 2023–24 season.

=== To III liga ===
Relegated from 2023–24 II liga	▼ Lech Poznań II ▼ Sandecja Nowy Sącz ▼ Stomil Olsztyn	Promoted from 2023–24 IV liga	Group 1 ▲ Sokół Aleksandrów Łódzki ▲ Wisła Płock II ▲ Wigry Suwałki ▲ Polonia Lidzbark Warmiński	Group 2 ▲ Wda Świecie ▲ Kotwica Kórnik ▲ Gryf Słupsk ▲ Wybrzeże Rewalskie Rewal	Group 3 ▲ Miedź Legnica II ▲ Polonia Słubice ▲ Stal Brzeg ▲ Podlesianka Katowice	Group 4 ▲ Korona Kielce II ▲ Wisła Kraków II ▲ Lewart Lewartów ▲ Pogoń-Sokół Lubaczów

=== From III liga ===
Promoted to 2024–25 II liga	▲ Pogoń Grodzisk Mazowiecki ▲ Świt Szczecin ▲ Rekord Bielsko-Biała ▲ Wieczysta Kraków	Relegated to 2024–25 IV liga	Group 1 ▼ Olimpia Zambrów ▼ Concordia Elbląg ▼ Legionovia Legionowo ▼ Pilica Białobrzegi	Group 2 ▼ Wikęd Luzino ▼ Stolem Gniewino ▼KP Starogard Gdański ▼ Unia Solec Kujawski	Group 3 (Note: After Radunia Stężyca's withdrawal from the II liga, only three teams were relegated from Group 3.) ▼ Gwarek Tarnowskie Góry ▼LZS Starowice Dolne ▼ Raków Częstochowa II	Group 4 ▼ Garbarnia Kraków (Note: Unia Tarnów was initially scheduled for relegation, before Garbarnia withdrew from competition on 30 July 2024.) ▼ Karpaty Krosno ▼ Orlęta Radzyń Podlaski ▼ Sokół Sieniawa

== Format ==
Location of teams and stadiums in 2024–25 III liga. Red: Group I, Green: Group II, Yellow: Group III, Blue: Group IV
Location of teams and stadiums in 2024–25 III liga.

72 teams are divided into four groups according to geographical criteria:

- Group I (Łódź – Masovian – Podlaskie – Warmian-Masurian)
- Group II (Kuyavian-Pomeranian – Greater Poland – Pomeranian – West Pomeranian)
- Group III (Lower Silesian – Lubusz – Opole – Silesian)
- Group IV (Świętokrzyskie – Lesser Poland – Lublin – Podkarpackie)

== Teams ==
The following teams competed in the III liga for the 2024–25 season.

Group I	Group II	Group III	Group IV
Broń Radom; GKS Bełchatów; GKS Wikielec; Jagiellonia Białystok II; Lechia Tomaszów Mazowiecki; Legia Warsaw II; ŁKS Łomża; Mławianka Mława; Pelikan Łowicz; Polonia Lidzbark Warmiński; Sokół Aleksandrów Łódzki; Stomil Olsztyn; Świt Nowy Dwór Mazowiecki; Unia Skierniewice; Warta Sieradz; Victoria Sulejówek; Wigry Suwałki; Wisła Płock II	Błękitni Stargard; Cartusia Kartuzy; Elana Toruń; Flota Świnoujście; Gedania Gdańsk; Gryf Słupsk; Kotwica Kórnik; Lech Poznań II; Noteć Czarnków; Pogoń Nowe Skalmierzyce; Pogoń Szczecin II; Polonia Środa Wielkopolska; Sokół Kleczew; Unia Swarzędz; Vineta Wolin; Wda Świecie; Wybrzeże Rewalskie Rewal; Zawisza Bydgoszcz	Carina Gubin; Górnik Zabrze II; Górnik Polkowice; Karkonosze Jelenia Góra; Lechia Zielona Góra; LKS Goczałkowice-Zdrój; Miedź Legnica II; MKS Kluczbork; Odra Bytom Odrzański; Podlesianka Katowice; Polonia Słubice; Pniówek Pawłowice Śląskie; Stal Brzeg; Stilon Gorzów Wielkopolski; Śląsk Wrocław II; Ślęza Wrocław; Unia Turza Śląska; Warta Gorzów Wielkopolski	Avia Świdnik; Chełmianka Chełm; Czarni Połaniec; Korona Kielce II; KS Wiązownica; KSZO Ostrowiec Świętokrzyski; Lewart Lubartów; Podhale Nowy Targ; Podlasie Biała Podlaska; Pogoń-Sokół Lubaczów; Sandecja Nowy Sącz; Siarka Tarnobrzeg; Star Starachowice; Świdniczanka Świdnik; Unia Tarnów; Wisła Kraków II; Wisłoka Dębica; Wiślanie Skawina

== League tables ==
=== Group I ===
III liga Group I
- Season: 2024–25
- Dates: 2 August 2024 – 7 June 2025
- Champions: Unia Skierniewice
- Promoted: Unia Skierniewice
- Relegated: Stomil Olsztyn; Victoria Sulejówek; Polonia Lidzbark Warmiński; Pelikan Łowicz; Sokół Aleksandrów Łódzki
- Matches: 306
- Goals: 928 (3.03 per match)
- Top goalscorer: Hubert Antkowiak; Kamil Sabiłło (24 goals each)
- Biggest home win: Mławianka 6–0 Świt (14 September 2024); Unia 6–0 Polonia (17 November 2024); ŁKS 6–0 Lechia (12 April 2025)
- Biggest away win: Victoria 0–5 Świt (16 November 2024)
- Highest scoring: Świt 2–6 Unia (17 August 2024); Lechia 4–4 ŁKS (14 September 2024); GKS B. 6–2 Mławianka (23 November 2024)

Pos	Team	Pld	W	D	L	GF	GA	GD	Pts	Promotion
1	Unia Skierniewice (C, P)	34	23	5	6	81	30	+51	74	Promotion to II liga
2	Legia Warsaw II	34	21	7	6	75	39	+36	70	Qualification to the promotion play-offs
3	ŁKS Łomża	34	18	10	6	68	38	+30	64	
4	Warta Sieradz	34	16	7	11	46	42	+4	55	
5	Wigry Suwałki	34	13	9	12	46	38	+8	48	
6	Jagiellonia Białystok II	34	13	8	13	54	49	+5	47 (Note: Ranked based on head-to-head goal difference: Jagiellonia II Białystok +2, Świt Nowy Dwór Mazowiecki -2.)	
7	Świt Nowy Dwór Mazowiecki	34	13	8	13	47	58	−11	47	
8	GKS Bełchatów	34	12	10	12	52	52	0	46 (Note: Ranked based on head-to-head points: GKS Bełchatów 7 pts, Broń Radom 5 pts, Lechia Tomaszów Mazowiecki 4 pts.)	
9	Broń Radom	34	12	10	12	40	48	−8	46	
10	Lechia Tomaszów Mazowiecki	34	13	7	14	57	64	−7	46	
11	Mławianka Mława	34	12	8	14	67	62	+5	44	
12	Wisła Płock II	34	11	10	13	54	58	−4	43	
13	GKS Wikielec	34	10	12	12	39	45	−6	42 (Note: Ranked based on head-to-head points: GKS Wikielec 4 pts, Stomil Olsztym 1 pt.)	
14	Stomil Olsztyn (R)	34	11	9	14	44	56	−12	42	Relegation to IV liga
15	Victoria Sulejówek (R)	34	11	8	15	52	59	−7	41 (Note: Ranked based on head-to-head goal difference: Victoria Sulejówek +3, Polonia Lidzbark Warmiński -3.)	Relegation to IV liga
16	Polonia Lidzbark Warmiński (R)	34	9	14	11	46	60	−14	41	Relegation to IV liga
17	Pelikan Łowicz (R)	34	9	6	19	34	58	−24	33	Relegation to IV liga
18	Sokół Aleksandrów Łódzki (R)	34	2	6	26	26	72	−46	12	Relegation to IV liga

Source: 90minut.pl Soccerway
Rules for classification: 1. Number of points reached in the entire series of games; 2. Number of points reached in direct matches; 3. Goal difference in direct matches; 4. Goal difference in direct matches – away goals counted twice; 5. Goal difference in the whole series of games; 6. Number of goals scored in the entire series of games.
(C) Champions; (P) Promoted; (R) Relegated

=== Group II ===
III liga Group II
- Season: 2024–25
- Dates: 3 August 2024 – 7 June 2025
- Champions: Sokół Kleczew
- Promoted: Sokół Kleczew
- Relegated: Kotwica Kórnik; Gedania Gdańsk; Gryf Słupsk; Vineta Wolin
- Matches: 306
- Goals: 965 (3.15 per match)
- Top goalscorer: Patryk Mikita (22 goals)
- Biggest home win: Vineta 6–0 Gedania (7 September 2024); Wda 6–0 Polonia (13 October 2024)
- Biggest away win: Kotwica 0–5 Polonia (26 October 2024)
- Highest scoring: Polonia 6–4 Vineta (24 November 2024)

Pos	Team	Pld	W	D	L	GF	GA	GD	Pts	Promotion
1	Sokół Kleczew (C, P)	34	22	6	6	60	35	+25	72	Promotion to II liga
2	Błękitni Stargard	34	19	6	9	78	45	+33	63	Qualification to the promotion play-offs
3	Zawisza Bydgoszcz	34	17	8	9	65	41	+24	59	
4	Pogoń Szczecin II	34	15	13	6	72	45	+27	58	
5	Lech Poznań II	34	16	9	9	65	47	+18	57	
6	Unia Swarzędz	34	15	10	9	58	47	+11	55	
7	Polonia Środa Wielkopolska	34	14	9	11	67	58	+9	51	
8	Pogoń Nowe Skalmierzyce	34	14	6	14	47	47	0	48	
9	Elana Toruń	34	11	14	9	44	42	+2	47	
10	Wda Świecie	34	12	10	12	47	41	+6	46	
11	Noteć Czarnków	34	13	6	15	61	64	−3	45	
12	Flota Świnoujście	34	12	8	14	48	56	−8	44	
13	Cartusia Kartuzy	34	12	7	15	43	51	−8	43	
14	Wybrzeże Rewalskie Rewal	34	10	7	17	32	54	−22	37	
15	Kotwica Kórnik (R)	34	8	12	14	49	60	−11	36	Relegation to IV liga
16	Gedania Gdańsk (R)	34	10	4	20	43	80	−37	34	Relegation to IV liga
17	Gryf Słupsk (R)	34	6	12	16	38	55	−17	30	Relegation to IV liga
18	Vineta Wolin (R)	34	4	5	25	48	97	−49	17	Relegation to IV liga

Source: 90minut.pl Soccerway
Rules for classification: 1. Number of points reached in the entire series of games; 2. Number of points reached in direct matches; 3. Goal difference in direct matches; 4. Goal difference in direct matches – away goals counted twice; 5. Goal difference in the whole series of games; 6. Number of goals scored in the entire series of games.
(C) Champions; (P) Promoted; (R) Relegated

=== Group III ===
III liga Group III
- Season: 2024–25
- Dates: 3 August 2024 – 7 June 2025
- Champions: Śląsk Wrocław II
- Promoted: Śląsk Wrocław II
- Relegated: Stilon Gorzów Wielkopolski; Podlesianka Katowice; Odra Bytom Odrzański; Unia Turza Śląska; Stal Brzeg; Polonia Słubice
- Matches: 306
- Goals: 879 (2.87 per match)
- Top goalscorer: Dawid Wojtyra (22 goals)
- Biggest home win: Miedź II 7–0 Odra (11 April 2025)
- Biggest away win: Odra 0–7 Śląsk II (22 March 2025)
- Highest scoring: Unia 3–7 Ślęza (16 April 2025)

Pos	Team	Pld	W	D	L	GF	GA	GD	Pts	Promotion
1	Śląsk Wrocław II (C, P)	34	23	6	5	75	30	+45	75	Promotion to II liga
2	MKS Kluczbork	34	21	6	7	69	23	+46	69	Qualification to the promotion play-offs
3	Miedź Legnica II	34	20	7	7	72	45	+27	67	
4	Carina Gubin	34	19	6	9	62	36	+26	63	
5	Warta Gorzów Wielkopolski	34	18	7	9	57	39	+18	61	
6	LKS Goczałkowice-Zdrój	34	14	14	6	48	34	+14	56	
7	Ślęza Wrocław	34	14	10	10	56	47	+9	52 (Note: Ranked based on head-to-head points: Ślęza Wrocław 4 pts, Lechia Zielona Góra 1 pt.)	
8	Lechia Zielona Góra	34	15	7	12	48	37	+11	52	
9	Górnik Polkowice	34	14	9	11	48	40	+8	51	
10	Pniówek Pawłowice	34	15	4	15	42	63	−21	49	
11	Karkonosze Jelenia Góra	34	13	9	12	40	43	−3	48 (Note: Ranked based on head-to-head points: Karkonosze Jelenia Góra 4 pts, Górnik II Zabrze 1 pt.)	
12	Górnik Zabrze II	34	13	9	12	57	44	+13	48	
13	Stilon Gorzów Wielkopolski (R)	34	13	6	15	42	44	−2	45	Relegation to IV liga
14	Podlesianka Katowice (R)	34	10	7	17	51	61	−10	37	Relegation to IV liga
15	Odra Bytom Odrzański (R)	34	8	9	17	42	71	−29	33	Relegation to IV liga
16	Unia Turza Śląska (R)	34	5	6	23	28	73	−45	21	Relegation to IV liga
17	Stal Brzeg (R)	34	3	9	22	26	60	−34	18	Relegation to IV liga
18	Polonia Słubice (R)	34	1	3	30	16	89	−73	6	Relegation to IV liga

Source: 90minut.pl Soccerway
Rules for classification: 1. Number of points reached in the entire series of games; 2. Number of points reached in direct matches; 3. Goal difference in direct matches; 4. Goal difference in direct matches – away goals counted twice; 5. Goal difference in the whole series of games; 6. Number of goals scored in the entire series of games.
(C) Champions; (P) Promoted; (R) Relegated

=== Group IV ===
III liga Group IV
- Season: 2024–25
- Dates: 3 August 2024 – 7 June 2025
- Champions: Sandecja Nowy Sącz
- Promoted: Sandecja Nowy Sącz; Podhale Nowy Targ
- Relegated: KS Wiązownica; Lewart Lubartów; Unia Tarnów
- Matches: 306
- Goals: 1,022 (3.34 per match)
- Top goalscorer: Rafał Wolsztyński (25 goals)
- Biggest home win: Siarka 9–0 Wiślanie (10 May 2025)
- Biggest away win: Unia 1–9 Wisłoka (21 August 2024)
- Highest scoring: Unia 1–9 Wisłoka (21 August 2024); Wisła II 6–4 Pogoń-Sokół (7 September 2024); Wisłoka 8–2 Unia (15 March 2025)

Pos	Team	Pld	W	D	L	GF	GA	GD	Pts	Promotion
1	Sandecja Nowy Sącz (C, P)	34	22	8	4	65	31	+34	74	Promotion to II liga
2	Podhale Nowy Targ (O, P)	34	21	5	8	67	43	+24	68	Qualification to the promotion play-offs
3	Siarka Tarnobrzeg	34	20	5	9	76	42	+34	65	
4	KSZO Ostrowiec Świętokrzyski	34	19	6	9	55	40	+15	63	
5	Avia Świdnik	34	18	8	8	77	44	+33	62	
6	Korona Kielce II	34	17	10	7	71	50	+21	61	
7	Star Starachowice	34	16	7	11	61	46	+15	55	
8	Podlasie Biała Podlaska	34	15	8	11	59	42	+17	53 (Note: Ranked based on head-to-head points: Podlasie Biała Podlaska 4 pts, Chełmianka Chełm 1 pt.)	
9	Chełmianka Chełm	34	16	5	13	74	62	+12	53	
10	Wisłoka Dębica	34	14	4	16	61	55	+6	46	
11	Czarni Połaniec	34	11	8	15	52	64	−12	41 (Note: Ranked based on head-to-head points: Czarni Połaniec 4 pts, Wisła II Kraków 1 pt.)	
12	Wisła Kraków II	34	11	8	15	72	60	+12	41	
13	Świdniczanka Świdnik	34	10	9	15	44	54	−10	39 (Note: Ranked based on head-to-head difference: Świdniczanka Świdnik -10, Wiślanie Skawina -19.)	
14	Wiślanie Skawina	34	10	9	15	41	60	−19	39	
15	Pogoń-Sokół Lubaczów	34	10	7	17	50	68	−18	37	
16	KS Wiązownica (R)	34	7	9	18	38	70	−32	30	Relegation to IV liga
17	Lewart Lubartów (R)	34	5	4	25	31	85	−54	19	Relegation to IV liga
18	Unia Tarnów (R)	34	2	4	28	28	106	−78	10	Relegation to IV liga

Source: 90minut.pl Soccerway
Rules for classification: 1. Number of points reached in the entire series of games; 2. Number of points reached in direct matches; 3. Goal difference in direct matches; 4. Goal difference in direct matches – away goals counted twice; 5. Goal difference in the whole series of games; 6. Number of goals scored in the entire series of games.
(C) Champions; (O) Play-off winner; (P) Promoted; (R) Relegated

== See also ==
- 2024–25 Ekstraklasa
- 2024–25 I liga
- 2024–25 II liga
- 2024–25 Polish Cup
- 2024 Polish Super Cup
