= Bartłomiej Olszewski =

Polish footballer (born 1996)

Personal information
- Full name: Bartłomiej Olszewski
- Date of birth: 29 January 1996 (age 30)
- Place of birth: Lubaczów, Poland
- Height: 1.76 m (5 ft 9 1/2 in)
- Position: Left-back

Team information
- Current team: Warta Sieradz
- Number: 29

Youth career
- Igros Krasnobród
- Hetman Zamość
- 2012–2015: Górnik Zabrze

Senior career*
Years	Team	Apps	(Gls)
2015–2019	Górnik Zabrze II	45	(1)
2016–2019	Górnik Zabrze	18	(0)
2016–2017	→ MKS Kluczbork (loan)	16	(0)
2019–2021	Pogoń Siedlce	68	(2)
2021–2023	Stal Stalowa Wola	59	(0)
2023	Karpaty Krosno	10	(0)
2024	Igros Krasnobród	0	(0)
2024–	ŁKS Łomża	69	(9)
2024–	Warta Sieradz	1	(0)
- * Club domestic league appearances and goals as of 17:12, 15 September 2026 (UTC)

Bartłomiej Olszewski (born 29 January 1996) is a Polish professional footballer who plays as a left-back for III liga club Warta Sieradz.

== Honours ==
Górnik Zabrze II

- Polish Cup (Zabrze regionals): 2015–16

Stal Stalowa Wola

- III liga, group IV: 2022–23
- Polish Cup (Subcarpathia regionals): 2021–22, 2022–23
- Polish Cup (Stalowa Wola regionals): 2021–22, 2022–23

ŁKS Łomża

- Polish Cup (Podlasie regionals): 2024–25
