= Konrad Nowak (footballer, born 1994) =

Polish footballer

Personal information
- Full name: Konrad Nowak
- Date of birth: 7 November 1994 (age 32)
- Place of birth: Katowice, Poland
- Height: 1.75 m (5 ft 9 in)
- Position: Attacking midfielder

Team information
- Current team: Świt Szczecin
- Number: 94

Youth career
- Rozwój Katowice

Senior career*
Years	Team	Apps	(Gls)
2011–2012	Rozwój Katowice	28	(5)
2012–2019	Górnik Zabrze	58	(1)
2016	→ Rozwój Katowice (loan)	13	(1)
2019–2020	Puszcza Niepołomice	24	(1)
2020–2026	Odra Opole	138	(12)
2026–	Świt Szczecin	0	(0)

International career
2011	Poland U18	1	(0)
2013	Poland U19	3	(0)
2014	Poland U20	1	(0)
- * Club domestic league appearances and goals as of 08:38, 27 May 2026 (UTC)

Konrad Nowak (born 7 November 1994) is a Polish professional footballer who plays as an attacking midfielder for II liga club Świt Szczecin.

== Club career ==
Nowak started his career with Rozwój Katowice.

On 13 August 2020, he joined Odra Opole on a one-year contract.

== Career statistics ==
As of match played 29 November 2025

Appearances and goals by club, season and competition
Club	Season	League			Polish Cup		Europe		Other		Total	
Club	Season	Division	Apps	Goals	Apps	Goals	Apps	Goals	Apps	Goals	Apps	Goals
Rozwój Katowice	2010–11	III liga, gr. F	1	0	—		—		—		1	0
Rozwój Katowice	2011–12	III liga, gr. F	27	5	—		—		—		27	5
Rozwój Katowice	Total		28	5	—		—		—		28	5
Górnik Zabrze	2012–13	Ekstraklasa	18	0	1	0	—		—		19	0
Górnik Zabrze	2013–14	Ekstraklasa	1	0	0	0	—		—		1	0
Górnik Zabrze	2014–15	Ekstraklasa	12	1	1	0	—		—		13	1
Górnik Zabrze	2015–16	Ekstraklasa	2	0	0	0	—		—		2	0
Górnik Zabrze	2016–17	I liga	11	0	1	0	—		—		12	0
Górnik Zabrze	2017–18	Ekstraklasa	2	0	2	0	—		—		4	0
Górnik Zabrze	2018–19	Ekstraklasa	12	0	2	0	1 (Note: Appearance in UEFA Europa League)	0	—		15	0
Górnik Zabrze	Total		58	1	7	0	1	0	—		66	1
Rozwój Katowice (loan)	2015–16	I liga	13	1	—		—		—		13	1
Puszcza Niepołomice	2018–19	I liga	11	1	1	0	—		—		12	1
Puszcza Niepołomice	2019–20	I liga	13	0	1	0	—		—		14	0
Puszcza Niepołomice	Total		24	1	2	0	—		—		26	1
Odra Opole	2020–21	I liga	33	6	1	0	—		—		34	6
Odra Opole	2021–22	I liga	29	4	1	0	—		1 (Note: Appearance in I liga promotion play-offs)	0	31	4
Odra Opole	2022–23	I liga	32	1	1	0	—		—		33	1
Odra Opole	2023–24	I liga	7	0	0	0	—		1	0	8	0
Odra Opole	2024–25	I liga	27	1	2	0	—		—		29	1
Odra Opole	2025–26	I liga	8	0	2	1	—		—		10	1
Odra Opole	Total		136	12	7	1	—		2	0	145	13
Świt Szczecin	2026–27	II liga	0	0	—		—		—		0	0
Career total			259	20	16	1	1	0	2	0	278	21

== Honours ==
Rozwój Katowice

- III liga Opole–Silesia: 2011–12
