= Damian Ciechanowski =

Polish professional footballer

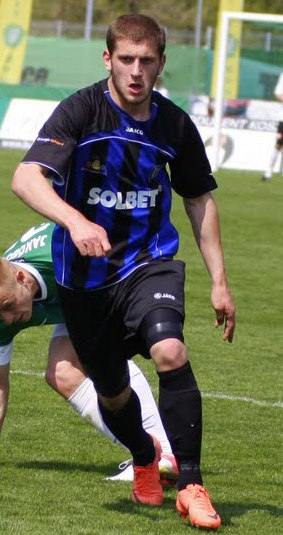
- Ciechanowski with Zawisza Bydgoszcz in 2013

Personal information
- Full name: Damian Ciechanowski
- Date of birth: 3 April 1996 (age 30)
- Place of birth: Bydgoszcz, Poland
- Height: 1.78 m (5 ft 10 in)
- Position: Right-back

Team information
- Current team: Świt Szczecin
- Number: 20

Youth career
- Zawisza Bydgoszcz

Senior career*
Years	Team	Apps	(Gls)
2012–2016	Zawisza Bydgoszcz	24	(0)
2016–2021	Olimpia Grudziądz	156	(5)
2021–2022	Stomil Olsztyn	10	(0)
2022	Unia Janikowo	15	(3)
2022–2023	KP Starogard Gdański	32	(3)
2023–2025	Świt Szczecin	49	(1)
2025–	Świt Szczecin	30	(1)

International career
2013	Poland U18	3	(0)
2014	Poland U19	5	(0)
- * Club domestic league appearances and goals as of 18:56, 31 May 2026 (UTC)

Damian Ciechanowski (born 3 April 1996) is a Polish professional footballer who plays as a right-back for II liga club Świt Szczecin.

On 20 July 2013, he made his Ekstraklasa debut coming on as substitute in a match against Jagiellonia Białystok.

== Honours ==
Zawisza Bydgoszcz

- I liga: 2012–13
- Polish Cup: 2013–14

Świt Szczecin

- III liga, group II: 2023–24
- Polish Cup (West Pomerania regionals): 2023–24
