= 2024–25 II liga =

II liga
- Season: 2024–25
- Dates: 19 July 2024 – 7 June 2025
- Champions: Polonia Bytom (1st title)
- Promoted: Polonia Bytom; Pogoń Grodzisk Mazowiecki; Wieczysta Kraków
- Relegated: Olimpia Elbląg; Skra Częstochowa; Wisła Puławy; Zagłębie Lubin II
- Matches: 306
- Goals: 853 (2.79 per match)
- Top goalscorer: Daniel Świderski (22 goals)
- Biggest home win: Wieczysta 7–1 Hutnik (17 August 2024)
- Biggest away win: Olimpia 0–5 Hutnik (24 May 2025)
- Highest scoring: Polonia 5–4 Świt (30 March 2025)
- Longest winning run: 12 matches Polonia Bytom
- Longest unbeaten run: 19 matches Pogoń Grodzisk Mazowiecki
- Longest winless run: 10 matches Olimpia Elbląg; Olimpia Grudziądz
- Longest losing run: 5 matches Olimpia Elbląg; Wisła Puławy
- Highest attendance: 7,515; Zagłębie S. 0–1 Kalisz (22 March 2025)
- Lowest attendance: 0 (Note: All matches hosted by Skra Częstochowa are played behind closed doors without any spectators.); 17 matches
- Total attendance: 295,293
- Average attendance: 965 ▲23.4%

The 2024–25 II liga (also known as Betclic II liga for sponsorship reasons) was the 77th season of the third tier domestic division in the Polish football league system since its establishment in 1948 and the 17th season of the Polish II liga under its current title. The league was operated by the Polish Football Association.

The league was contested by 18 teams. The regular season was played in a round-robin tournament. The season started on 19 July 2024 and concluded on 7 June 2025 (regular season). From this season onwards, promotion/relegation play-offs were introduced, with teams placed 13th and 14th facing two second-placed teams from the III liga.

== Teams ==
A total of 18 teams participated in the 2024–25 II liga season.

=== Changes from last season ===
The following teams have changed division since the 2023–24 season.

==== To II liga ====
Relegated from 2023–24 I liga	Promoted from 2023–24 III liga
▼ Resovia Rzeszów (16th) ▼ Podbeskidzie Bielsko-Biała (17th) ▼ Zagłębie Sosnowiec (18th)	▲ Pogoń Grodzisk Mazowiecki (Group 1) ▲ Świt Szczecin (Group 2) ▲ Rekord Bielsko-Biała (Group 3) ▲ Wieczysta Kraków (Group 4)

==== From II liga ====
Promoted to 2024–25 I liga	Relegated to 2024–25 III liga	Relegated to IV liga
▲ Pogoń Siedlce (1st) ▲ Kotwica Kołobrzeg (2nd) ▲ Stal Stalowa Wola (PO)	▼ Lech Poznań II (16th) ▼ Sandecja Nowy Sącz (17th) ▼ Stomil Olsztyn (18th)	▼ Radunia Stężyca (7th)

=== Stadiums and locations ===
Location of teams in 2024–25 II liga.
Location of teams in the Katowice urban area in 2024–25 II Liga.

Note: Table lists in alphabetical order.

Team	Location	Venue	Capacity
Chojniczanka Chojnice	Chojnice	Municipal Stadium	2,923
GKS Jastrzębie	Jastrzębie-Zdrój	Jastrzębie-Zdrój Stadium	5,650
Hutnik Kraków	Kraków	Suche Stawy Stadium	6,000
KKS 1925 Kalisz	Kalisz	Municipal Stadium	8,166
ŁKS Łódź II	Łódź	Władysław Król Stadium	18,029
Olimpia Elbląg	Elbląg	Elbląg Stadium	2,985
Olimpia Grudziądz	Grudziądz	Bronisław Malinowski Stadium	5,323
Podbeskidzie Bielsko-Biała	Bielsko-Biała	Bielsko-Biała Stadium	15,316
Pogoń Grodzisk Mazowiecki	Grodzisk Mazowiecki	Municipal Stadium	919
Polonia Bytom	Bytom	Polonia Stadium	2,220
Rekord Bielsko-Biała	Bielsko-Biała	Centrum Sportu Rekord	593
Resovia Rzeszów	Rzeszów	Municipal Stadium^{1}	11,547
Skra Częstochowa	Częstochowa	Miejski Stadion Piłkarski Skra	990
Świt Szczecin	Szczecin	Obiekt Sportowy Skolwin	974
Wieczysta Kraków	Kraków	Wieczysta Stadium	1,500
Wisła Puławy	Puławy	Municipal Stadium	4,418
Zagłębie Lubin II	Lubin	Lubin Stadium	16,068
Zagłębie Sosnowiec	Sosnowiec	ArcelorMittal Park	11,600

1. Due to the renovation of the Resovia Stadium in Rzeszów, Resovia play their home games at the Stal Stadium.

== League table ==
Pos	Team	Pld	W	D	L	GF	GA	GD	Pts	Promotion or Relegation
1	Polonia Bytom (C, P)	34	22	6	6	69	34	+35	72	Promotion to I liga
2	Pogoń Grodzisk Mazowiecki (P)	34	21	6	7	64	39	+25	69	Promotion to I liga
3	Wieczysta Kraków (O, P)	34	19	6	9	65	29	+36	63 (Note: Ranked based on head-to-head points: Wieczysta Kraków 4 pts, Chojniczanka Chojnice 1 pt.)	Qualification for the promotion play-offs
4	Chojniczanka Chojnice	34	18	9	7	50	29	+21	63	Qualification for the promotion play-offs
5	Świt Szczecin	34	14	10	10	58	52	+6	52	Qualification for the promotion play-offs
6	KKS 1925 Kalisz	34	15	6	13	37	38	−1	51 (Note: Ranked based on head-to-head points: KKS 1925 Kalisz 6 pts, Podbeskidzie Bielsko-Biała 0 pts.)	Qualification for the promotion play-offs
7	Podbeskidzie Bielsko-Biała	34	14	9	11	44	35	+9	51	
8	Hutnik Kraków	34	14	7	13	49	59	−10	49	
9	Zagłębie Sosnowiec	34	12	10	12	48	52	−4	46	
10	Resovia Rzeszów	34	12	9	13	46	48	−2	45	
11	GKS Jastrzębie	34	12	6	16	35	34	+1	42 (Note: Ranked based on goal difference: GKS Jastrzębie +1, ŁKS Łódź II -8.)	
12	ŁKS Łódź II	34	11	9	14	41	49	−8	42	
13	Rekord Bielsko-Biała	34	10	11	13	50	54	−4	41	
14	Olimpia Grudziądz (O)	34	11	7	16	42	51	−9	40	Qualification for the relegation play-offs
15	Wisła Puławy (Note: Wisła Puławy was punished with a deduction of 2 points and later relegated due to financial problems.) (R)	34	12	3	19	42	65	−23	37	Relegation to III liga
16	Zagłębie Lubin II (Note: Due to Kotwica Kołobrzeg and Wisła Puławy failing to obtain a license to play in the 2025–26 II liga, the last relegation play-off spot was passed down to Zagłębie Lubin II.) (R)	34	9	7	18	51	58	−7	34	Qualification for the relegation play-offs
17	Skra Częstochowa (Note: Skra Częstochowa was punished with a deduction of 8 points for financial arrears.) (R)	34	9	4	21	32	60	−28	23	Relegation to III liga
18	Olimpia Elbląg (R)	34	4	9	21	30	67	−37	21	Relegation to III liga

Source: 90minut.pl
Rules for classification: 1) Points; 2) Head-to-head points; 3) Head-to-head goal difference; 4) Goal difference; 6) Goals scored; 7) Number of wins; 8) Number of away wins.
(Note: Head-to-head record is used only after all the matches between the teams in question have been played)
(C) Champions; (O) Play-off winner; (P) Promoted; (R) Relegated

== Positions by round ==
Note: The place taken by the team that played fewer matches than the opponents was underlined. (Note: The list of postponed matches: Wisła Puławy – Zagłębie Lubin II (1st round, played on 14 August 2024); Polonia Bytom – Zagłębie Lubin II (8th round, played on 18 September 2024); GKS Jastrzębie – Wisła Puławy (8th round, played on 18 September 2024); Skra Częstochowa – Polonia Bytom (9th round, played on 16 October 2024); Wieczysta Kraków – GKS Jastrzębie (9th round, played on 1 October 2024); Zagłębie Sosnowiec – Pogoń Grodzisk Mazowiecki (9th round, played on 16 October 2024); Wieczysta Kraków – Polonia Bytom (13th round, played on 23 October 2024); Zagłębie Lubin II – Pogoń Grodzisk Mazowiecki (13th round, played on 23 October 2024); ŁKS Łódź II – Olimpia Elbląg (13th round, played on 23 October 2024); Skra Częstochowa – ŁKS Łódź II (18th round, played on 29 November 2024); Zagłębie Lubin II – Wisła Puławy (18th round, played on 30 November 2024); GKS Jastrzębie – Olimpia Elbląg (19th round, played on 2 April 2025); KKS 1925 Kalisz – Wisła Puławy (20th round), verified as walkover for KKS 1925 Kalisz.; Resovia – Polonia Bytom (23rd round, played on 9 April 2025); Rekord Bielsko-Biała – Zagłębie II Lubin (23rd round, played on 9 April 2025); Rekord Bielsko-Biała – Świt Szczecin (31st round, played on 27 May 2025))

Team ╲ Round	1	2	3	4	5	6	7	8	9	10	11	12	13	14	15	16	17	18	19	20	21	22	23	24	25	26	27	28	29	30	31	32	33	34
Polonia Bytom	16	9	7	4	3	3	2	2	3	1	1	1	1	1	3	2	2	3	3	3	3	3	3	3	3	2	3	2	2	2	1	1	1	1
Pogoń Grodzisk Mazowiecki	3	1	1	1	1	1	1	1	1	2	2	3	3	2	1	1	1	1	1	1	1	1	1	1	1	1	1	1	1	1	2	2	2	2
Wieczysta Kraków	14	10	5	3	2	2	3	3	4	3	3	2	2	3	2	3	3	2	2	2	2	2	2	2	2	3	2	3	3	3	3	3	3	3
Chojniczanka Chojnice	3	8	6	5	7	7	7	7	5	6	6	6	5	5	5	5	4	4	4	4	4	4	4	4	4	4	4	4	4	4	4	4	4	4
Świt Szczecin	7	6	3	7	8	10	11	9	10	10	11	11	11	9	7	6	8	8	8	6	8	8	7	8	6	7	7	8	7	5	7	8	5	5
KKS 1925 Kalisz	7	7	4	8	6	6	5	6	8	7	8	8	8	10	11	9	6	6	6	8	7	7	6	7	8	8	9	9	10	9	6	6	6	6
Podbeskidzie Bielsko-Biała	9	13	15	13	13	12	13	11	12	12	12	13	12	12	10	11	10	10	10	10	11	11	11	9	9	9	8	7	6	7	5	5	8	7
Hutnik Kraków	17	17	12	9	10	8	8	8	6	5	5	4	4	4	4	4	5	5	7	5	6	5	5	6	7	6	6	5	5	6	8	7	7	8
Zagłębie Sosnowiec	5	2	2	2	5	4	4	5	7	9	7	7	6	7	9	8	9	7	5	7	5	6	8	5	5	5	5	6	8	8	10	9	9	9
Resovia Rzeszów	6	3	8	6	4	5	6	4	2	4	4	5	7	6	8	10	7	9	9	9	9	10	10	11	11	10	11	10	9	10	11	10	10	10
GKS Jastrzębie	1	4	9	10	11	9	10	12	13	13	13	15	13	13	13	13	15	15	15	14	13	14	15	14	13	15	16	15	16	14	14	13	11	11
ŁKS Łódź II	2	5	10	11	12	14	12	13	14	15	15	14	15	16	15	15	14	14	12	11	10	9	9	10	10	11	10	11	11	11	9	11	12	12
Rekord Bielsko-Biała	15	15	11	12	15	15	15	16	16	14	14	12	14	14	14	14	13	13	14	15	15	13	14	15	14	13	13	13	14	15	15	15	14	13
Olimpia Grudziądz	13	15	17	17	14	13	14	14	11	11	10	9	9	11	12	12	12	12	13	12	14	15	13	12	12	12	12	12	12	12	12	12	13	14
Wisła Puławy	11	12	14	15	9	11	9	10	9	8	9	10	10	8	6	7	11	11	11	13	12	12	12	13	15	14	14	14	13	13	13	14	15	15
Zagłębie Lubin II	11	14	16	15	17	16	16	17	15	16	16	16	16	17	18	18	16	16	17	16	16	16	16	16	16	16	15	16	15	16	16	16	16	16
Skra Częstochowa	18	18	18	18	18	18	18	18	18	18	18	18	18	18	17	16	17	17	16	17	17	17	17	17	17	17	17	17	17	17	17	17	17	17
Olimpia Elbląg	9	11	13	14	16	17	17	15	17	17	17	17	17	15	16	17	18	18	18	18	18	18	18	18	18	18	18	18	18	18	18	18	18	18

Promotion to I liga
Qualification for promotion play-offs
Qualification for relegation play-offs
Relegation to III liga

Source: 90minut.pl

== Results ==
Home \ Away	CHC	JAS	HUT	KAL	ŁKS	ELB	GRU	POD	PGM	PBT	REK	RES	SKR	ŚWI	WIE	WPU	ZAG	ZSO
Chojniczanka Chojnice	—	1–0	3–0	0–1	1–2	2–0	4–1	2–1	1–0	1–0	2–0	2–1	1–0	1–1	1–1	4–0	2–1	1–1
GKS Jastrzębie	1–1	—	5–0	0–2	0–1	0–1	1–2	0–0	0–1	2–4	1–0	1–1	1–0	1–0	0–1	1–2	1–0	1–0
Hutnik Kraków	3–2	1–0	—	0–2	1–1	2–1	1–1	0–2	4–2	3–5	1–1	3–2	3–1	0–1	1–0	1–0	2–1	1–4
KKS 1925 Kalisz	2–3	1–1	1–1	—	2–1	2–0	0–1	1–0	0–2	2–4	2–2	0–2	1–0	3–1	0–2	3–0 (Note: The match was officially recorded as walkover for KKS 1925 Kalisz due to the suspended Wisła Puławy license.)	2–1	1–2
ŁKS Łódź II	0–1	1–2	1–0	0–0	—	3–1	2–4	0–2	4–0	2–0	2–2	0–1	3–1	1–1	0–2	0–0	0–3	3–1
Olimpia Elbląg	1–0	1–1	0–5	1–0	1–1	—	1–1	1–1	1–3	0–0	2–4	1–2	0–1	1–2	0–3	0–1	0–0	4–1
Olimpia Grudziądz	0–1	1–0	4–3	0–1	1–0	4–0	—	2–1	2–1	1–1	0–1	0–3	2–1	2–2	1–3	2–3	1–0	1–3
Podbeskidzie Bielsko-Biała	1–1	1–1	2–0	0–1	3–0	0–0	2–1	—	0–2	0–1	0–3	1–1	3–0	2–1	1–0	2–1	2–1	0–0
Pogoń Grodzisk Mazowiecki	1–1	0–3	1–1	0–1	2–0	3–3	2–1	3–1	—	2–0	2–2	3–1	3–0	4–1	2–1	2–1	2–0	3–2
Polonia Bytom	2–2	2–0	2–0	3–0	3–0	3–0	2–0	1–0	0–1	—	5–1	3–1	5–3	5–4	1–0	4–0	4–2	0–1
Rekord Bielsko-Biała	0–1	0–2	0–1	2–1	2–4	4–0	1–1	0–2	1–1	0–0	—	2–3	2–2	1–3	2–2	2–0	0–0	1–2
Resovia Rzeszów	1–0	0–1	0–1	2–0	2–2	2–2	2–1	2–3	2–0	0–0	1–2	—	2–2	0–1	1–4	3–1	3–3	1–1
Skra Częstochowa	2–0	2–1	1–4	1–1	0–1	1–0	2–1	1–0	0–2	1–2	1–2	1–0	—	1–2	1–0	2–1	1–3	1–1
Świt Szczecin	1–1	3–1	3–1	1–1	0–0	3–0	3–1	3–3	1–2	0–1	3–2	1–1	2–0	—	0–3	2–4	4–4	1–0
Wieczysta Kraków	1–0	1–0	7–1	2–0	4–0	3–2	0–0	2–3	1–1	3–1	1–2	0–1	4–1	2–2	—	1–2	3–0	1–1
Wisła Puławy	1–4	1–4	0–0	1–2	0–4	3–2	0–0	2–1	1–3	1–3	1–2	0–1	1–0	2–0	0–2	—	5–1	1–0
Zagłębie Lubin II	0–1	1–2	1–1	2–0	4–0	4–2	2–1	1–4	0–2	0–1	3–3	4–1	2–0	0–2	0–1	6–2	—	0–0
Zagłębie Sosnowiec	2–2	1–0	2–3	0–1	2–2	2–1	2–1	0–0	2–6	1–1	2–1	2–0	4–1	1–3	1–4	1–4	3–1	—

Source: 90minut.pl
Legend: Blue = home team win; Yellow = draw; Red = away team win.
For upcoming matches, an "a" indicates there is an article about the rivalry between the two participants.

== Results by round ==
Team ╲ Round	1	2	3	4	5	6	7	8	9	10	11	12	13	14	15	16	17	18	19	20	21	22	23	24	25	26	27	28	29	30	31	32	33	34
Chojniczanka Chojnice	W	L	W	W	L	L	W	D	W	D	D	L	W	L	W	D	W	W	W	W	L	W	W	L	W	D	W	D	W	W	D	D	D	W
GKS Jastrzębie	W	D	L	D	L	W	L	L	D	L	L	L	W	D	W	L	L	L	W	D	L	L	W	L	W	L	L	W	L	W	W	W	W	D
Hutnik Kraków	L	L	W	W	L	W	W	D	W	W	D	D	D	L	W	D	L	W	L	W	D	W	L	L	L	D	W	W	L	L	L	W	W	L
KKS 1925 Kalisz	D	W	W	L	W	L	W	D	L	W	D	L	D	L	L	W	W	W	D	W	L	L	W	L	L	L	L	W	L	W	W	W	W	D
ŁKS Łódź II	W	D	L	L	D	L	W	L	L	L	D	D	L	W	L	W	D	W	W	L	W	W	L	D	D	L	W	L	W	D	W	L	L	D
Olimpia Elbląg	D	D	L	L	L	L	L	W	L	L	D	D	W	L	L	L	L	D	L	L	L	L	W	W	L	D	L	L	L	D	L	L	D	D
Olimpia Grudziądz	L	L	L	L	W	W	L	D	W	L	W	W	D	L	L	D	L	L	D	D	L	L	W	W	W	D	W	L	W	L	W	D	L	L
Podbeskidzie Bielsko-Biała	D	L	L	D	D	W	L	W	L	D	L	L	W	W	W	L	W	D	L	L	D	W	L	W	W	D	D	W	W	D	W	W	L	W
Pogoń Grodzisk Mazowiecki	W	W	W	W	W	W	D	D	W	D	W	W	W	W	W	D	W	W	W	L	W	W	W	W	L	W	L	D	L	W	L	L	L	D
Polonia Bytom	L	W	W	W	W	W	W	W	W	W	W	W	W	L	L	W	D	L	D	W	D	W	W	W	D	W	L	W	W	W	W	D	D	L
Rekord Bielsko-Biała	L	L	W	L	L	D	L	D	L	W	D	W	L	L	D	W	D	L	L	D	D	W	D	W	D	D	W	D	L	L	W	L	W	W
Resovia Rzeszów	W	W	L	W	W	L	D	W	W	L	D	L	L	D	L	L	W	L	L	D	W	L	L	D	D	W	L	W	W	D	L	D	D	W
Skra Częstochowa	L	L	L	W	L	L	W	L	W	L	W	L	L	W	D	W	L	D	L	L	W	L	W	L	L	L	L	W	L	D	L	L	D	L
Świt Szczecin	D	W	W	L	D	L	L	W	L	L	D	W	D	W	W	D	D	L	W	W	L	L	W	L	W	L	D	D	W	W	D	W	W	D
Wieczysta Kraków	L	W	W	W	W	W	D	L	W	W	W	W	W	W	W	D	D	W	W	W	W	L	W	L	L	W	D	L	L	L	D	D	W	L
Wisła Puławy	D	L	L	W	W	L	W	W	W	L	L	L	L	W	W	L	L	L	L	L	D	W	L	L	L	W	W	L	W	L	W	D	L	L
Zagłębie Lubin II	L	L	D	L	L	D	D	W	L	L	D	D	L	L	L	D	W	L	W	L	L	W	W	L	D	W	W	L	W	L	L	L	L	W
Zagłębie Sosnowiec	W	W	W	D	D	W	L	L	D	W	L	W	L	L	L	D	D	W	W	D	W	L	L	W	W	L	D	L	L	D	L	D	D	W

Source: 90minut.pl
W = Win; D = Draw; L = Loss

== Promotion play-offs ==
The promotion play-offs were played on 12 and 15 June 2025. The teams who finished in 3rd, 4th, 5th and 6th place were set to compete. The fixtures were determined by final league position – 3rd team of the regular season played against 6th team of the regular season and 4th team of the regular season played against 5th team of the regular season. The winner of the final match has been promoted to the I liga for the 2025–26 season. All matches were played in a stadiums of team which occupied higher position in the regular season.

Semi-finals; 12 June 2025
3	Wieczysta Kraków	3
6	KKS 1925 Kalisz	1
4	Chojniczanka Chojnice	5
5	Świt Szczecin	3

Final; 15 June 2025
3	Wieczysta Kraków	2
4	Chojniczanka Chojnice	0

== Relegation play-offs ==
The relegation play-offs will be played on 11, 15 and 18 June 2025. The semi-finals will be played over a single leg between runners-up of each III liga group. The winner of each semi-final advances to the final, played over two legs against a 13th or a 14th-placed II liga team. The winner of the final match will play in the II liga the following season. The final matches will be hosted by the winners of the semi-finals.

On 10 June 2025, 13th-placed Rekord Bielsko-Biała was replaced by the 16th-placed Zagłębie Lubin II, after Kotwica Kołobrzeg (relegated from the 2024–25 I liga) and Wisła Puławy (15th-placed team) were denied a license to compete in the II liga in the following season.

Semi-finals; 11 June 2025
II	Błękitni Stargard	3
III	MKS Kluczbork	0
IV	Podhale Nowy Targ	2 (4)
I	Legia Warsaw II	2 (3)

Final; 15 & 18 June 2025
II	Błękitni Stargard	0	0	0
14	Olimpia Grudziądz	2	2	4
IV	Podhale Nowy Targ	2	3	5
16	Zagłębie Lubin II	3	1	4

== Season statistics ==
=== Top goalscorers ===
Rank	Player	Club	Goals
1	(Poland) Daniel Świderski	Rekord Bielsko-Biała	22
2	(Poland) Kamil Wojtyra	Polonia Bytom	20
3	(Poland) Kamil Biliński	Zagłębie Sosnowiec	13
3	(Poland) Maciej Górski	Resovia (11); Podbeskidzie Bielsko-Biała (2)	13
3	(Poland) Krzysztof Ropski	Świt Szczecin	13
6	(Poland) Paweł Łysiak	Wieczysta Kraków	12
6	(Poland) Kamil Odolak	Pogoń Grodzisk Mazowiecki	12
8	(Poland) Michał Głogowski	Hutnik Kraków	11
9	(Poland) Grzegorz Aftyka	Świt Szczecin	10
9	(Poland) Konrad Andrzejczak	Polonia Bytom	10
9	(Poland) Szymon Kapelusz	Świt Szczecin	10
9	(Spain) Joan Román	Wieczysta Kraków	10
9	(Latvia) Valērijs Šabala	Chojniczanka Chojnice	10

== Attendances ==
Pos	Team	Total	High	Low	Average	Change
1	Zagłębie Sosnowiec	88,600	7,515	2,857	5,212	+5.5%^{1}
2	Podbeskidzie Bielsko-Biała	35,385	5,535	806	2,081	−39.0%^{1}
3	Polonia Bytom	17,206	1,178	754	1,012	+34.9%
4	Chojniczanka Chojnice	16,211	1,717	437	954	+3.2%
5	GKS Jastrzębie	14,989	1,712	435	882	−3.2%
6	Pogoń Grodzisk Mazowiecki	14,815	992	712	871	n/a^{2}
7	Olimpia Elbląg	13,782	2,578	417	811	−9.6%
8	Rekord Bielsko-Biała	13,298	4,181	275	782	n/a^{2}
9	Resovia Rzeszów	13,227	1,528	387	778	−55.5%^{1}
10	Hutnik Kraków	12,981	999	550	764	−0.8%
11	KKS 1925 Kalisz	10,935	1,679	296	683	−47.6%
12	Wieczysta Kraków	11,310	986	303	665	n/a^{2}
13	Świt Szczecin	8,859	860	235	521	n/a^{2}
14	Wisła Puławy	7,843	643	243	461	−14.2%
15	Olimpia Grudziądz	7,108	674	220	418	−28.7%
16	ŁKS Łódź II	5,323	970	103	313	−4.0%
17	Zagłębie Lubin II	3,421	772	64	201	+27.2%
18	Skra Częstochowa	0	0	0	0	n/a
	League total	295,293	7,515	0	965	+23.4%

Source: 90minut.pl
Notes:
1. Team played last season in I liga.
2. Team played last season in III liga.

== See also ==
- 2024–25 Ekstraklasa
- 2024–25 I liga
- 2024–25 III liga
- 2024–25 Polish Cup
- 2024 Polish Super Cup
