= Patryk Walicki =

Footballer (born 2003)

Personal information
- Date of birth: 29 May 2003 (age 23)
- Place of birth: Belgium
- Position: Midfielder

Team information
- Current team: Unia Skierniewice

Youth career
- K. Diegem Sport

Senior career*
Years	Team	Apps	(Gls)
2020–2021	K. Diegem Sport	2	(0)
2021–2022	Beerschot	1	(0)
2022–2024	Gent	0	(0)
2022–2024	Gent II	12	(1)
2023–2024	→ Francs Borains (loan)	9	(0)
2024–2026	Francs Borains	2	(0)
2025	→ Tournai (loan)	12	(0)
2025–2026	→ Royal Knokke (loan)	11	(0)
2026–	Unia Skierniewice	0	(0)

International career
2022	Poland U20	2	(0)
- * Club domestic league appearances and goals as of 3 May 2026

Patryk Walicki (born 29 May 2003) is a professional footballer who plays as a midfielder for I liga club Unia Skierniewice. Born in Belgium, he has represented Poland internationally at youth level.

== Club career ==
On 13 February 2022, Walicki made his debut for Beerschot in a 2–1 Belgian Pro League win against KV Kortrijk.

On 21 May 2024, after spending the season with Francs Borains on loan from Gent, it was announced Walicki would be joining the Les Verts permanently on a two-year contract, with an extension option, in July that year.

On 3 February 2025, Walicki joined Tournai on loan for the rest of the season. On 6 September 2025, he moved on loan to Royal Knokke.

On 11 July 2026, Walicki signed a one-year deal with Polish second-tier club Unia Skierniewice, with an option for another year.

== Style of play ==
Walicki mainly operates as a midfielder and has received comparisons to Poland international Piotr Zieliński.

== Personal life ==
Walicki's parents are Polish and emigrated to Belgium in their teens. He grew up in Brussels and has an older brother.
