= Marcin Radzewicz =

Polish footballer (born 1980)

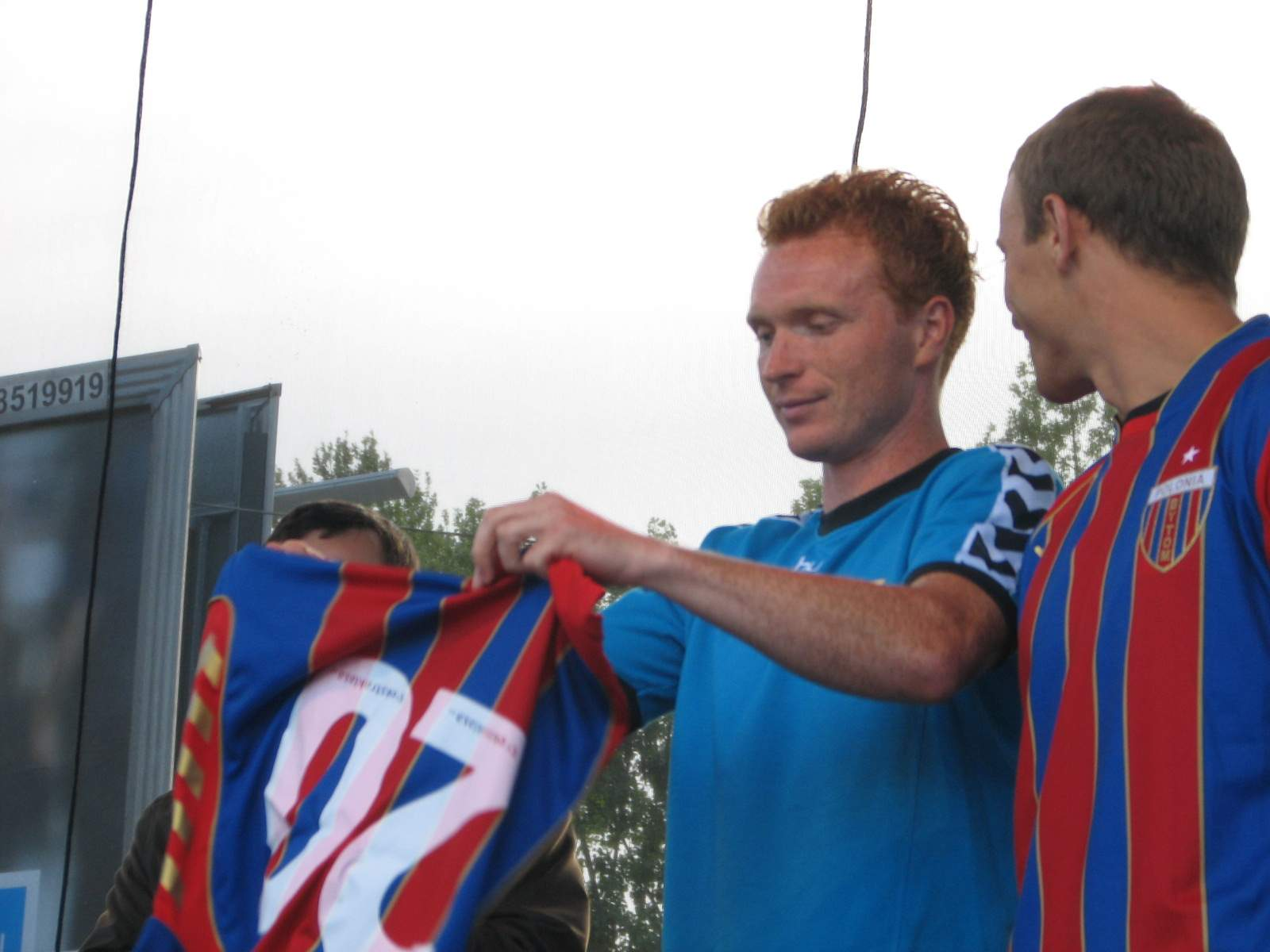
- Radzewicz (left) in 2009

Personal information
- Full name: Marcin Radzewicz
- Date of birth: 30 June 1980 (age 46)
- Place of birth: Jastrzębie-Zdrój, Poland
- Height: 1.76 m (5 ft 9 in)
- Position: Midfielder

Senior career*
Years	Team	Apps	(Gls)
- MOSiR Jastrzębie-Zdrój
1996–1999	Odra Wodzisław Śląski II		
1999–2000	MK Górnik Katowice		
2000	BBTS Bielsko-Biała		
2001	Rozwój Katowice	12	(2)
2001–2002	Górnik Jastrzębie-Zdrój	28	(8)
2002–2003	Piast Gliwice	26	(6)
2003–2004	Odra Wodzisław Śląski	26	(1)
2004–2006	Groclin Grodzisk Wlkp.	36	(2)
2005	→ Obra Kościan (loan)		
2006–2007	Odra Wodzisław Śląski	23	(1)
2007–2011	Polonia Bytom	92	(6)
2008	→ Piast Gliwice (loan)	11	(1)
2011–2014	Arka Gdynia	94	(4)
2014–2018	GKS Tychy	109	(7)
2018	Polonia Bytom	17	(1)
2018–2021	KKS 1925 Kalisz	86	(4)
2022	Odra Wodzisław Śląski	14	(0)
2024	GKS Jastrzębie II	13	(0)

International career
2003	Poland	2	(0)

Managerial career
- 2021: KKS 1925 Kalisz (player-caretaker)
- 2021: KKS 1925 Kalisz (player-assistant)
- 2023: Arka Gdynia (assistant)
- 2024: GKS Jastrzębie II (player-assistant)
- 2025–: GKS Jastrzębie (assistant)
- 2025: GKS Jastrzębie (caretaker)
- * Club domestic league appearances and goals

Marcin Radzewicz (born 30 June 1980) is a Polish former professional footballer who played as a midfielder. He also held coaching and executive roles at KKS 1925 Kalisz, Arka Gdynia and GKS Jastrzębie.

== Career ==
In July 2011, he joined Arka Gdynia on a one-year contract. He also played two times for Poland national football team.

== Managerial statistics ==
As of match played 24 September 2025

Managerial record by team and tenure
Team	From	To	Record							
Team	From	To	G	W	D	L	GF	GA	GD	Win %
KKS 1925 Kalisz (player-caretaker)	19 October 2021	24 October 2021	1	0	1	0	2	2	+0	0.00
GKS Jastrzębie (caretaker)	22 September 2025	25 September 2025	1	0	1	0	2	2	+0	0.00
Total			2	0	2	0	4	4	+0	0.00

== Honours ==
Polonia Bytom

- IV liga Silesia II: 2017–18

KKS 1925 Kalisz

- III liga, group II: 2019–20
- Polish Cup (Kalisz regionals): 2018–19
