= Victoria Sulejówek =

Polish football club

- Full name: MLKS Victoria Sulejówek
- Founded: 1957; 68 years ago
- Ground: Stadion Miejski
- Capacity: 1,240
- Chairman: Mariusz Jarzębski
- Manager: Michał Maliszewski
- League: IV liga Masovia
- 2024–25: III liga, group I, 15th of 18 (relegated)
- Website: https://www.victoriasulejowek.pl

MLKS Victoria Sulejówek is a Polish football club from Sulejówek, Masovian Voivodeship. They compete in the IV liga Masovia, the fifth level of the national football league system.

In the 2018–19 season, Victoria Sulejówek reached the round of 64 in the 2018–19 Polish Cup.
