= Stadion Miejski (Łomża) =

Athletics stadium in Łomża, Poland

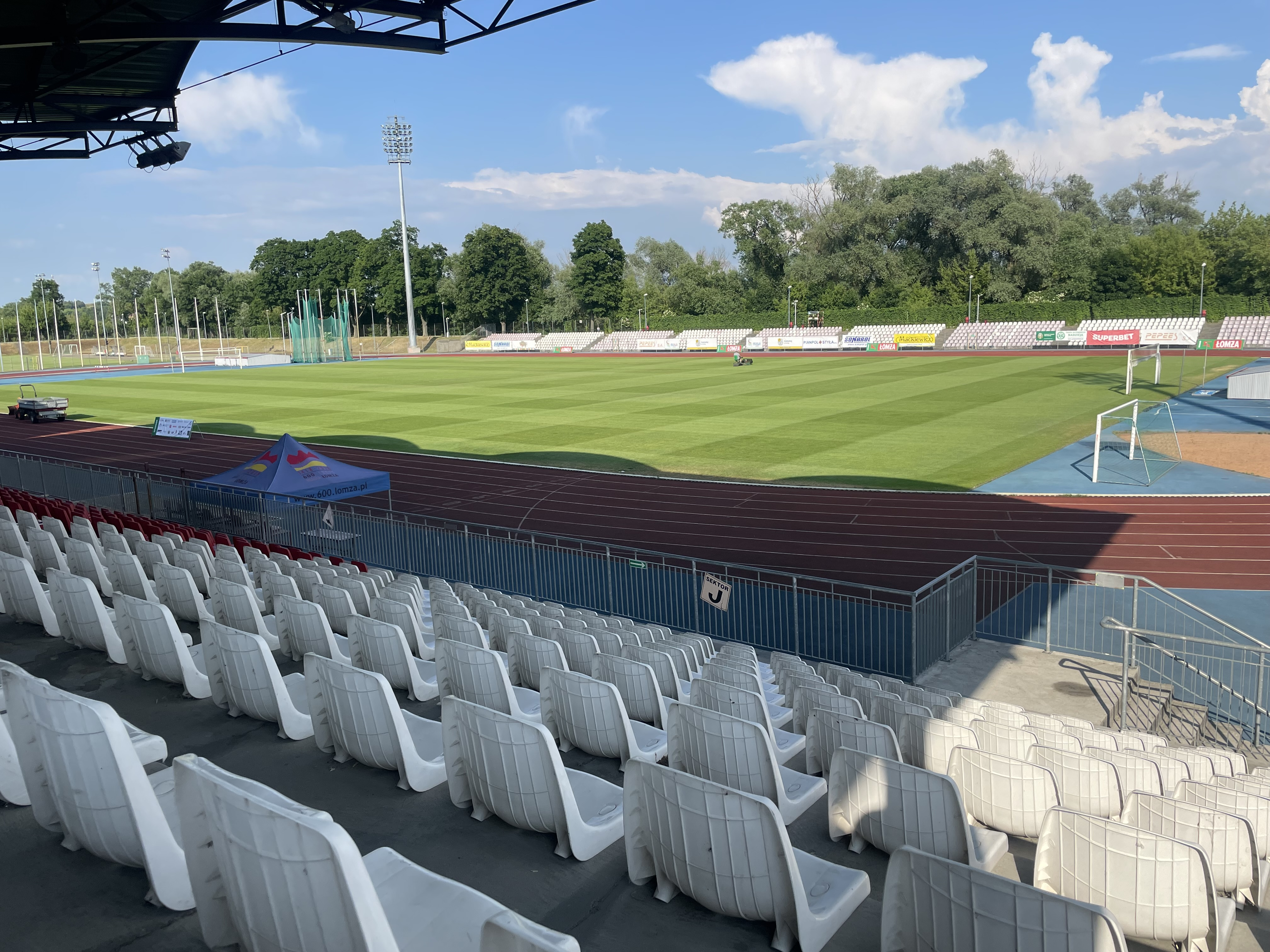
- Łomża Municipal Stadium in 2023
- Interactive map of Stadion Miejski
- Full name: Stadion Miejski w Łomży
- Address: Zjazd 18, 18-400
- Location: Łomża, Poland
- Coordinates: 53°11′13.2″N 22°5′16.4″E
- Owner: City of Łomża
- Capacity: 3,450
- Surface: Grass
- Field size: 105 by 69 meters (114.8 yd x 75.5 yd)

Construction
- Built: 1932
- Opened: 1932
- Renovated: 2006–2011
- Reopened: March 29, 2011
- Cost: 25 mn PLN (US$6,800,000)

Tenant
- ŁKS Łomża

The Łomża Municipal Stadium (Polish: Stadion Miejski w Łomży) is a football and athletics stadium for the football club ŁKS in Łomża, Poland.

It is a modern football and athletics stadium with two stands with a capacity of 3,450 seats, including one covered.

The entire stadium complex includes: stands, the main ground of the stadium, a full-size training ground with artificial surface, a full-size training ground with a natural surface, changing rooms, tennis courts and all athletics facilities with a running track.

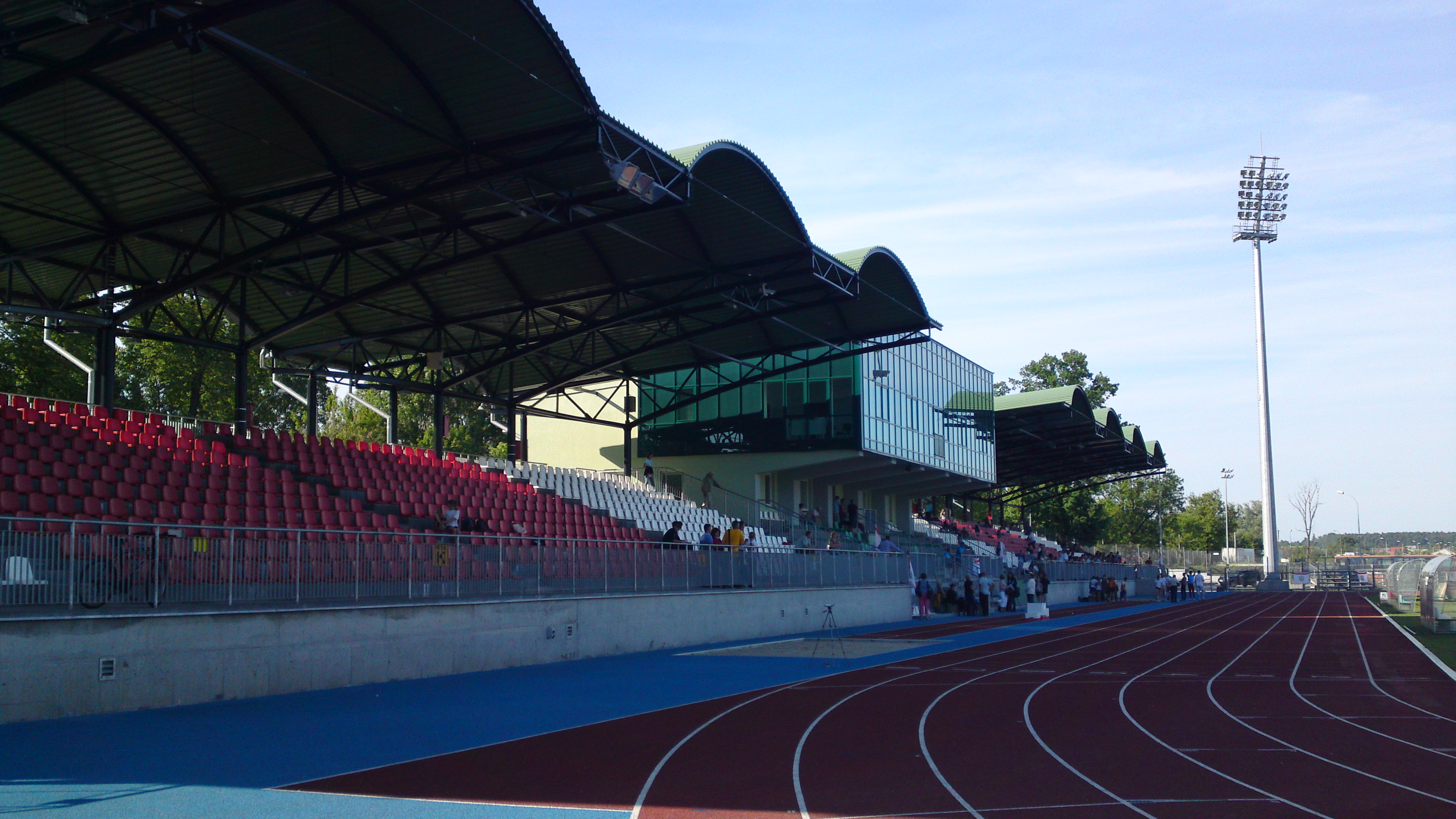
Main stands

The municipal stadium in Łomża also received the IV A certificate of the Polish Athletic Association. This means that at the stadium in Łomża, it is possible to organize, for example, national meetings in all age categories, industry national championships (e.g. AZS) or central level competitions in the macro-region.

== Modernization ==
Modernization of the stadium began in 2006, and was completed on March 29, 2011. The first match was a friendly between Poland and Netherlands U-18 national teams, which Poland won 3–0.

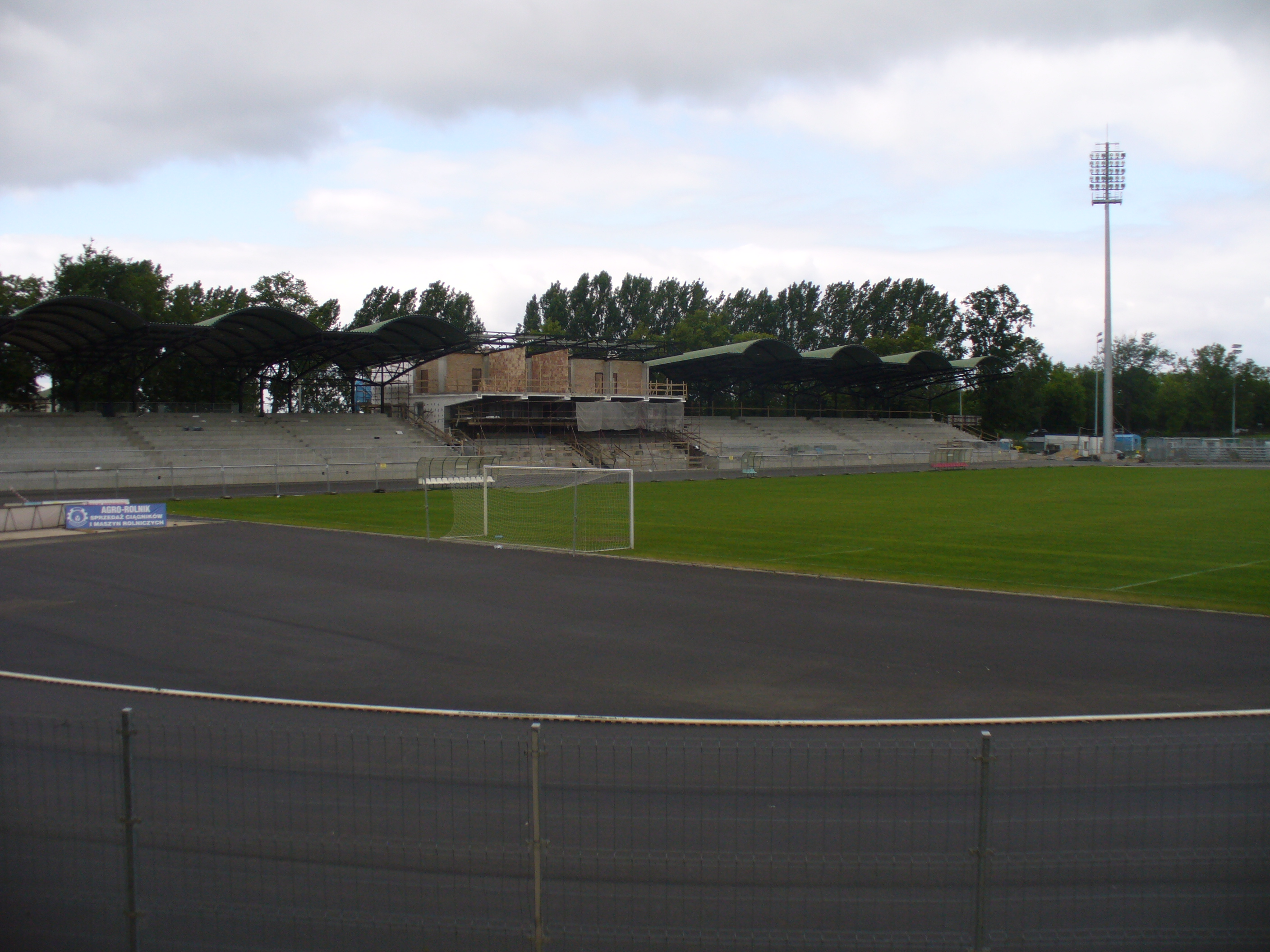
The stadium in 2010 during modernizaition
