= Unia Skierniewice =

Polish football club

- Full name: Miejski Klub Sportowy Unia Skierniewice
- Founded: June 1945; 81 years ago 2007; 19 years ago (refounded as Vis); June 2013; 13 years ago (refounded as UMKS Unia)
- Ground: Municipal Stadium
- Capacity: 3,001
- Chairman: Paweł Trojan
- Manager: Kamil Socha
- League: I liga
- 2025–26: II liga, 1st of 18 (promoted)
- Website: uniaskierniewice.pl

Miejski Klub Sportowy Unia Skierniewice is a Polish football club based in Skierniewice, Łódź Voivodeship, established in June 1945. As of the 2026–27 season, they compete in the I liga, the second tier of Polish football, after two consecutive promotions.

== Players ==
=== Current squad ===
As of 5 November 2026

Note: Flags indicate national team as defined under FIFA eligibility rules; some limited exceptions apply. Players may hold more than one non-FIFA nationality.

No.	Pos.	Nation	Player
1	GK	POL	Rafał Grocholski
2	DF	UKR	Oleksandr Gavrylenko
3	DF	POL	Jonatan Straus
4	MF	POL	Jakub Murat
6	MF	POL	Damian Makuch
7	DF	POL	Jakub Czarnecki
8	MF	POL	Patryk Walicki
9	FW	POL	Kamil Sabiłło
10	FW	POL	Krzysztof Toporkiewicz
11	FW	POL	Bartosz Bida
12	GK	POL	Antoni Wodzicki
15	DF	POL	Eryk Woliński
17	DF	POL	Julian Kamiński
18	MF	POL	Jan Mierzwa
19	MF	POL	Kacper Kalisz

No.	Pos.	Nation	Player
20	MF	POL	Maksymilian Kosior
21	MF	POL	Mateusz Szmyd
22	GK	POL	Stanisław Pruszkowski
23	FW	POL	Mateusz Mularczyk
24	DF	POL	Bartłomiej Eizenchart
25	FW	POL	Łukasz Wolsztyński
26	MF	POL	Oskar Melich
27	MF	POL	Jakub Bieroński
28	DF	POL	Mateusz Stępień (captain)
30	MF	POL	Miłosz Szczepański
36	GK	POL	Gustaw Wodzicki
52	MF	POL	Damian Gąska
53	MF	POL	Sammy Dudek (on loan from Lech Poznań)
77	MF	POL	Antoni Burkiewicz (on loan from Raków Częstochowa)
99	DF	POL	Igor Zyntek

=== Out on loan ===
Note: Flags indicate national team as defined under FIFA eligibility rules; some limited exceptions apply. Players may hold more than one non-FIFA nationality.

No.	Pos.	Nation	Player
—	MF	POL	Szymon Wrona (at Wiślanie Skawina until 30 June 2027)

== Honours ==
- II liga
  - Champions: 2025–26
- III liga, group I
  - Champions: 2024–25
  - Runners-up: 2023–24
- IV liga Łódź
  - Champions: 2017–18
- Regional league Skierniewice
  - Champions: 2015–16
- Klasa A Skierniewice
  - Champions: 2014–15
- Klasa B Skierniewice II
  - Champions: 2013–14
- Polish Cup (Łódź regionals)
  - Winners: 2001–02, 2018–19, 2019–20, 2020–21, 2022–23, 2023–24
  - Runners-up: 2016–17, 2024–25
- Polish Cup (Skierniewice regionals)
  - Winners: 1985–86, 1986–87, 1987–88, 1997–98, 1998–99, 1999–2000
