= Ján Fröhlich =

Slovak footballer

Personal information
- Full name: Ján Fröhlich
- Date of birth: 2 December 1974 (age 51)
- Place of birth: Stará Ľubovňa, Czechoslovakia
- Height: 1.90 m (6 ft 3 in)
- Position: Defender

Team information
- Current team: Partizán Bardejov (general manager)

Senior career*
Years	Team	Apps	(Gls)
- Plavnica
- Stará Ľubovňa
- TJ Michalovce
1999	Tatran Prešov	0	(0)
1999–2002	Sandecja Nowy Sącz		
2002–2006	GKS Bełchatów	81	(5)
2006–2007	Kolejarz Stróże		
2007–2012	Sandecja Nowy Sącz	106	(5)
2012–2017	Plavnica		
2017–2018	Stará Ľubovňa		

Managerial career
- 2025: Sandecja Nowy Sącz (caretaker)
- * Club domestic league appearances and goals

Ján Fröhlich (born 2 December 1974) is a Slovak former professional footballer who played as a defender. He currently serves as the general manager of Partizán Bardejov.

== Managerial statistics ==
As of match played 26 October 2025

Managerial record by team and tenure
Team	From	To	Record							
Team	From	To	G	W	D	L	GF	GA	GD	Win %
Sandecja Nowy Sącz (caretaker)	22 October 2025	28 October 2025	1	0	1	0	1	1	+0	0.00
Total			1	0	1	0	1	1	+0	0.00
