= Podhale Nowy Targ (football) =

Polish football club

- Full name: Nowotarski Klub Piłkarski Podhale Nowy Targ
- Nickname: Szarotki (the Edelweisses)
- Founded: 25 September 2009; 16 years ago
- Ground: Marshal Józef Piłsudski Stadium
- Capacity: 900
- Chairman: Michał Rubiś
- Manager: Tomasz Kuźma
- League: II liga
- 2025–26: II liga, 7th of 18
- Website: nkp.podhale.pl

NKP Podhale Nowy Targ is a Polish football club based in Nowy Targ, Lesser Poland Voivodeship, founded on 25 September 2009. As of the 2026–27 season, they compete in the II liga, the third tier of Polish football.

== Players ==
=== Current squad ===
As of 2 September 2026

Note: Flags indicate national team as defined under FIFA eligibility rules; some limited exceptions apply. Players may hold more than one non-FIFA nationality.

No.	Pos.	Nation	Player
1	GK	POL	Maciej Styrczuła (captain)
2	DF	POL	Krzysztof Salak
4	DF	POL	Radosław Seweryś
6	MF	POL	Bartosz Mikołajczyk
7	MF	POL	Łukasz Seweryn
8	MF	SVK	Rastislav Václavik
10	MF	POL	Arkadiusz Nowak
11	MF	POL	Tobiasz Kubik
14	FW	POL	Szymon Sobczak
16	MF	POL	Jakub Rubiś
17	MF	POL	Michał Surzyn
18	DF	SVK	Richard Pečarka
19	DF	POL	Marcin Michota

No.	Pos.	Nation	Player
21	FW	SVK	Peter Voško
23	MF	POL	Robert Rachwał
28	MF	POL	Alan Bród
29	MF	BRA	Marcinho
32	MF	POL	Artur Łukasz
33	GK	POL	Dorian Frątczak
41	MF	POL	Nikodem Gozdecki
42	MF	POL	Mikołaj Lipień
56	MF	POL	Filip Baniowski (on loan from Wisła Kraków)
71	MF	POL	Kacper Talar
77	MF	POL	Damian Kołtański
—	MF	POL	Stanisław Fedor
—	MF	POL	Kamil Kumoch

=== Out on loan ===
Note: Flags indicate national team as defined under FIFA eligibility rules; some limited exceptions apply. Players may hold more than one non-FIFA nationality.

No.	Pos.	Nation	Player
31	MF	POL	Patryk Kupczak (at Polonia Nysa until 30 June 2027)

== Honours ==
- III liga, group IV
  - Runners-up: 2018–19, 2024–25
- IV liga Lesser Poland East
  - Champions: 2014–15
- Regional league Nowy Sącz
  - Champions: 2013–14
- Klasa A Podhale
  - Champions: 2011–12
- Klasa B Podhale West
  - Champions: 2010–11
- Polish Cup (Lesser Poland regionals)
  - Winners: 2016–17, 2017–18, 2019–20, 2023–24
  - Runners-up: 2015–16
- Polish Cup (Podhale regionals)
  - Winners: 2015–16, 2018–19, 2021–22 (Autumn), 2021–22 (Spring), 2022–23
  - Runners-up: 2014–15, 2017–18, 2019–20
- Polish Cup (Nowy Sącz regionals)
  - Winners: 2015–16, 2016–17, 2019–20
