= ŁKS Łomża =

- Full name: Łomżyński Klub Sportowy
- Founded: 16 April 1926; 100 years ago (as Łomżynianka); 15 June 2010; 15 years ago (refounded)
- Ground: Municipal Stadium
- Capacity: 3,440
- Chairman: Tomasz Bałdyga
- Manager: Maciej Tarnogrodzki
- League: III liga, group I
- 2025–26: III liga, group I, 2nd of 18
- Website: http://www.lks.lomza.pl/
| Home colours | Away colours |

Łomżyński Klub Sportowy (Polish pronunciation: [ˈwɔmʐa]) is a Polish football club based in Łomża, currently competing in group I of the III liga.

== Players ==
=== Current squad ===
As of 15 March 2025

Note: Flags indicate national team as defined under FIFA eligibility rules; some limited exceptions apply. Players may hold more than one non-FIFA nationality.

| No. | Pos. | Nation | Player |
|---|---|---|---|
| 1 | GK | POL | Adrian Olszewski |
| 3 | DF | POL | Miłosz Skowronek (on loan from Chrobry Głogów) |
| 4 | DF | POL | Hubert Mich |
| 5 | DF | POL | Sebastian Zieleniecki (captain) |
| 6 | MF | POL | Mateusz Majbański |
| 7 | MF | POL | Dawid Owczarek |
| 8 | MF | POL | Wiktor Walczak |
| 11 | MF | POL | Patryk Winsztal |
| 14 | MF | POL | Wojciech Chojczak |
| 16 | MF | POL | Dawid Chludziński |
| 17 | MF | POL | Kamil Niewiadomski |
| 18 | MF | POL | Bartosz Bernatowicz |

| No. | Pos. | Nation | Player |
|---|---|---|---|
| 19 | DF | POL | Łukasz Kosakiewicz |
| 20 | DF | POL | Bartłomiej Olszewski |
| 21 | MF | POL | Przemysław Żebrowski |
| 22 | DF | POL | Łukasz Sychowicz |
| 23 | MF | POL | Krystian Puton |
| 27 | FW | POL | Jakub Proniewski |
| 29 | FW | POL | Hubert Antkowiak |
| 30 | MF | POL | Szymon Kuźma |
| 66 | DF | POL | Piotr Witasik |
| 77 | FW | POL | Cezary Sauczek |
| 97 | MF | POL | Filip Karmański |
| 99 | GK | UKR | Mykyta Rybchynskyi |

=== Out on loan ===
Note: Flags indicate national team as defined under FIFA eligibility rules; some limited exceptions apply. Players may hold more than one non-FIFA nationality.

| No. | Pos. | Nation | Player |
|---|---|---|---|
| — | MF | POL | Mikołaj Tarnacki (at KS Śniadowo until 30 June 2025) |

== See also ==
- Football in Poland
- List of football teams
