= Świt Szczecin =

Polish football club

- Full name: Klub Sportowy Świt Skolwin-Szczecin
- Founded: 28 February 1952; 74 years ago as Zakładowy Klub Sportowy Świt Skolwin
- Ground: Obiekt Sportowy Skolwin
- Capacity: 974
- Chairman: Paweł Adamczak
- Manager: Przemysław Cecherz
- League: II liga
- 2025–26: II liga, 12th of 18
- Website: swit.szczecin.pl
Home colours	Away colours

Klub Sportowy Świt Skolwin-Szczecin (English: Świt Skolwin-Szczecin Sports Club), commonly known as Świt Szczecin or Świt Skolwin, is a Polish football club, established in 1952, based in the Szczecin's neighbourhood of Skolwin. As of the 2026–27 season, they compete in the II liga, the third tier of Polish football.

== Players ==
=== Current squad ===
As of 15 September 2026

Note: Flags indicate national team as defined under FIFA eligibility rules; some limited exceptions apply. Players may hold more than one non-FIFA nationality.

No.	Pos.	Nation	Player
3	DF	POL	Dawid Szwiec
4	DF	POL	Sebastian Rogala
5	DF	POL	Jędrzej Góral
7	MF	AUT	Alexander Gorgon
8	MF	POL	Maciej Koziara
9	FW	POL	Krzysztof Ropski
10	MF	POL	Dawid Kort
11	MF	POL	Kacper Nowak
13	MF	POL	Szymon Kapelusz
15	MF	POL	Kacper Wojdak (captain)
18	MF	POL	Kacper Gołębiewski
19	DF	POL	Dawid Kisły

No.	Pos.	Nation	Player
20	DF	POL	Damian Ciechanowski
22	FW	POL	Aleksander Woźniak
23	DF	POL	Szymon Nowicki
24	MF	POL	Kacper Żendełek
31	GK	POL	Mateusz Abramowicz
34	DF	POL	Aleksander Kifert
76	GK	POL	Jakub Rajczykowski
80	MF	POL	Mateusz Andruszko
94	MF	POL	Konrad Nowak
99	FW	POL	Adam Frączczak
—	MF	POL	Patryk Pieślak

=== Out on loan ===
Note: Flags indicate national team as defined under FIFA eligibility rules; some limited exceptions apply. Players may hold more than one non-FIFA nationality.

No.	Pos.	Nation	Player
6	MF	POL	Karol Maszało (at Kluczevia Stargard until 30 June 2027)
—	DF	POL	Rafał Remisz (at Błękitni Stargard until 30 June 2027)

== Polish Cup records ==
Season	Round	Opponent	Result
2016–17	Preliminary round	Polonia Bytom	0–0 (4–5 p)
2020–21	Round of 64	Lechia Zielona Góra	4–1
2020–21	Round of 32	Cracovia	0–1
2021–22	Round of 64	Wisłoka Dębica	0–0 (7–6 p)
2021–22	Round of 32	Legia Warsaw	0–1
2024–25	First round	Wigry Suwałki	1–3 (a.e.t.)
2025–26	Preliminary round	ŁKS Łódź II	1–1 (6–5 p)
2025–26	First round	Miedź Legnica II	3–1
2025–26	Round of 32	Chojniczanka Chojnice	1–3
2026–27	Preliminary round	Olimpia Grudziądz	3–5 (a.e.t.)
