= 2025–26 in Polish football =

Football in Poland
- Season: 2025–26

Men's football
- Ekstraklasa: Lech Poznań
- I liga: Wisła Kraków
- II liga: Unia Skierniewice
- III liga: Legia Warsaw II; Zawisza Bydgoszcz; Lechia Zielona Góra; Avia Świdnik
- Polish Cup: Górnik Zabrze
- Polish Super Cup: Legia Warsaw

2025–26 in Polish football
- Teams in Europe
- Lech Poznań; Legia Warsaw; Raków Częstochowa; Jagiellonia Białystok
- Poland national team
- 2026 FIFA World Cup qualification

The 2025–26 season is the 101st season of competitive football in Poland.

== Men's football ==
=== League competitions ===
==== Ekstraklasa ====
| Pos | Team | Pld | W | D | L | GF | GA | GD | Pts | Qualification or relegation |
|---|---|---|---|---|---|---|---|---|---|---|
| 1 | Lech Poznań (C) | 34 | 16 | 12 | 6 | 62 | 45 | +17 | 60 | Qualification for the Champions League second qualifying round |
| 2 | Górnik Zabrze | 34 | 16 | 8 | 10 | 50 | 38 | +12 | 56 (Note: Head-to-head points: Górnik Zabrze 6, Jagiellonia Białystok 0.) | Qualification for the Champions League second qualifying round |
| 3 | Jagiellonia Białystok | 34 | 15 | 11 | 8 | 56 | 41 | +15 | 56 | Qualification for the Europa League third qualifying round (Note: The 2025–26 Polish Cup winners (Górnik Zabrze) qualify for the Europa League third qualifying round. As Górnik Zabrze finished in the top 2, then the berth went to the third place team.) |
| 4 | Raków Częstochowa | 34 | 16 | 7 | 11 | 51 | 40 | +11 | 55 | Qualification for the Conference League second qualifying round |
| 5 | GKS Katowice | 34 | 14 | 8 | 12 | 51 | 45 | +6 | 50 | Qualification for the Conference League second qualifying round |
| 6 | Legia Warsaw | 34 | 12 | 13 | 9 | 42 | 37 | +5 | 49 | |
| 7 | Zagłębie Lubin | 34 | 13 | 9 | 12 | 45 | 38 | +7 | 48 | |
| 8 | Wisła Płock | 34 | 12 | 10 | 12 | 34 | 38 | −4 | 46 | |
| 9 | Pogoń Szczecin | 34 | 13 | 6 | 15 | 47 | 49 | −2 | 45 | |
| 10 | Radomiak Radom | 34 | 11 | 11 | 12 | 52 | 53 | −1 | 44 | |
| 11 | Korona Kielce | 34 | 11 | 10 | 13 | 40 | 40 | 0 | 43 (Note: Tied on head-to-head points and goal difference. Overall goal difference: Korona Kielce 0, Motor Lublin –7.) | |
| 12 | Motor Lublin | 34 | 10 | 13 | 11 | 46 | 53 | −7 | 43 | |
| 13 | Cracovia | 34 | 9 | 15 | 10 | 39 | 42 | −3 | 42 (Note: Head-to-head points: Cracovia 4, Widzew Łódź 1.) | |
| 14 | Widzew Łódź | 34 | 12 | 6 | 16 | 41 | 41 | 0 | 42 | |
| 15 | Piast Gliwice | 34 | 11 | 8 | 15 | 42 | 46 | −4 | 41 | |
| 16 | Lechia Gdańsk (Note: Lechia Gdańsk were deducted 5 points due to financial arrears.) (R) | 34 | 12 | 7 | 15 | 62 | 65 | −3 | 38 | Relegation to I liga |
| 17 | Arka Gdynia (R) | 34 | 9 | 9 | 16 | 34 | 61 | −27 | 36 | Relegation to I liga |
| 18 | Bruk-Bet Termalica Nieciecza (R) | 34 | 9 | 7 | 18 | 43 | 65 | −22 | 34 | Relegation to I liga |

Source: ekstraklasa.org 90minut.pl
Rules for classification: 1) Points; 2) Head-to-head points; 3) Head-to-head goal difference; 4) Goal difference; 5) Goals scored; 6) Number of wins; 7) Number of away wins; 8) Lower number of points based on yellow and red cards (red card = 3 points, yellow card = 1 point, sending-off = 3 points - including 1 point for first yellow card); 9) Fairplay ranking; 10) Draw.
(Note: Head-to-head record is used only after all the matches between the teams in question have been played)
(C) Champions; (R) Relegated

==== I liga ====
| Pos | Team | Pld | W | D | L | GF | GA | GD | Pts | Promotion or Relegation |
|---|---|---|---|---|---|---|---|---|---|---|
| 1 | Wisła Kraków (C, P) | 34 | 20 | 11 | 3 | 72 | 32 | +40 | 71 | Promotion to Ekstraklasa |
| 2 | Śląsk Wrocław (P) | 34 | 17 | 11 | 6 | 69 | 47 | +22 | 62 | Promotion to Ekstraklasa |
| 3 | Wieczysta Kraków (O, P) | 34 | 16 | 9 | 9 | 70 | 47 | +23 | 57 | Qualification for promotion play-offs |
| 4 | Chrobry Głogów | 34 | 16 | 7 | 11 | 48 | 36 | +12 | 55 | Qualification for promotion play-offs |
| 5 | ŁKS Łódź | 34 | 15 | 9 | 10 | 56 | 48 | +8 | 54 | Qualification for promotion play-offs |
| 6 | Polonia Warsaw | 34 | 15 | 8 | 11 | 52 | 49 | +3 | 53 (Note: Head-to-head results: Polonia Warsaw 4 pts, Ruch Chorzów 1 pt.) | Qualification for promotion play-offs |
| 7 | Ruch Chorzów | 34 | 14 | 11 | 9 | 54 | 46 | +8 | 53 | |
| 8 | Miedź Legnica | 34 | 15 | 7 | 12 | 52 | 53 | −1 | 52 | |
| 9 | Puszcza Niepołomice | 34 | 12 | 13 | 9 | 45 | 40 | +5 | 49 | |
| 10 | Polonia Bytom | 34 | 13 | 8 | 13 | 56 | 50 | +6 | 47 | |
| 11 | Pogoń Grodzisk Mazowiecki | 34 | 11 | 12 | 11 | 51 | 54 | −3 | 45 | |
| 12 | Odra Opole | 34 | 11 | 11 | 12 | 34 | 40 | −6 | 44 | |
| 13 | Stal Rzeszów | 34 | 12 | 7 | 15 | 49 | 60 | −11 | 43 | |
| 14 | Stal Mielec | 34 | 10 | 6 | 18 | 51 | 62 | −11 | 36 (Note: Head-to-head results: Stal Mielec 4 pts, Pogoń Siedlce 1 pt.) | |
| 15 | Pogoń Siedlce | 34 | 9 | 9 | 16 | 33 | 43 | −10 | 36 | |
| 16 | Znicz Pruszków (R) | 34 | 7 | 7 | 20 | 40 | 68 | −28 | 28 | Relegation to II liga |
| 17 | Górnik Łęczna (R) | 34 | 5 | 12 | 17 | 39 | 62 | −23 | 27 | Relegation to II liga |
| 18 | GKS Tychy (R) | 34 | 5 | 8 | 21 | 40 | 74 | −34 | 23 | Relegation to II liga |

Source: 1liga.org, 90minut.pl
Rules for classification: 1) Points; 2) Head-to-head points; 3) Head-to-head goal difference; 4) Goal difference; 6) Goals scored; 7) Number of wins; 8) Number of away wins.
(Note: Head-to-head record is used only after all the matches between the teams in question have been played)
(C) Champions; (O) Play-off winner; (P) Promoted; (R) Relegated

==== II liga ====
| Pos | Team | Pld | W | D | L | GF | GA | GD | Pts | Promotion or Relegation |
|---|---|---|---|---|---|---|---|---|---|---|
| 1 | Unia Skierniewice (C, P) | 34 | 21 | 5 | 8 | 69 | 45 | +24 | 68 | Promotion to I liga |
| 2 | Warta Poznań (P) | 34 | 17 | 13 | 4 | 57 | 37 | +20 | 64 (Note: Head-to-head points: Warta Poznań 6, Olimpia Grudziądz 0.) | Promotion to I liga |
| 3 | Olimpia Grudziądz (Q) | 34 | 18 | 10 | 6 | 69 | 42 | +27 | 64 | Qualification for the promotion play-offs |
| 4 | Podbeskidzie BB (Q) | 34 | 17 | 7 | 10 | 64 | 43 | +21 | 58 | Qualification for the promotion play-offs |
| 5 | Śląsk Wrocław II (Q) | 34 | 16 | 7 | 11 | 65 | 49 | +16 | 55 (Note: Tied on head-to-head points and goal difference. Overall goal difference: Śląsk Wrocław II +16, Sandecja Nowy Sącz +14.) | Qualification for the promotion play-offs |
| 6 | Sandecja Nowy Sącz (Q) | 34 | 14 | 13 | 7 | 54 | 40 | +14 | 55 | Qualification for the promotion play-offs |
| 7 | Podhale Nowy Targ | 34 | 13 | 14 | 7 | 46 | 35 | +11 | 53 | |
| 8 | Chojniczanka Chojnice | 34 | 14 | 10 | 10 | 58 | 47 | +11 | 52 | |
| 9 | Rekord Bielsko-Biała | 34 | 12 | 10 | 12 | 45 | 48 | −3 | 46 (Note: Head-to-head points: Rekord Bielsko-Biała 6, Stal Stalowa Wola 5, Hutnik Kraków 3.) | |
| 10 | Stal Stalowa Wola | 34 | 10 | 16 | 8 | 56 | 43 | +13 | 46 | |
| 11 | Hutnik Kraków | 34 | 12 | 10 | 12 | 47 | 40 | +7 | 46 | |
| 12 | Świt Szczecin | 34 | 12 | 8 | 14 | 51 | 59 | −8 | 44 | |
| 13 | Resovia Rzeszów (Q) | 34 | 10 | 12 | 12 | 48 | 47 | +1 | 42 | Qualification for the relegation play-offs |
| 14 | Sokół Kleczew (Q) | 34 | 10 | 7 | 17 | 47 | 62 | −15 | 37 | Qualification for the relegation play-offs |
| 15 | Zagłębie Sosnowiec (R) | 34 | 9 | 7 | 18 | 37 | 61 | −24 | 34 (Note: Head-to-head points: Zagłębie Sosnowiec 4, KKS 1925 Kalisz 1.) | Relegation to III liga |
| 16 | KKS 1925 Kalisz (R) | 34 | 8 | 10 | 16 | 37 | 55 | −18 | 34 | Relegation to III liga |
| 17 | ŁKS Łódź II (R) | 34 | 5 | 10 | 19 | 33 | 64 | −31 | 25 | Relegation to III liga |
| 18 | GKS Jastrzębie (Note: GKS Jastrzębie were deducted 1 point due to financial arrears. GKS Jastrzębie has withdrawn from the competition after 24th round.) (R) | 34 | 0 | 7 | 27 | 18 | 84 | −66 | 6 | Withdrawn from the league |

Source: 90minut.pl
Rules for classification: 1) Points; 2) Head-to-head points; 3) Head-to-head goal difference; 4) Goal difference; 6) Goals scored; 7) Number of wins; 8) Number of away wins.
(Note: Head-to-head record is used only after all the matches between the teams in question have been played)
(C) Champions; (P) Promoted; (Q) Qualified for the phase indicated; (R) Relegated

==== III liga ====
===== Group 1 =====
| Pos | Team | Pld | W | D | L | GF | GA | GD | Pts | Promotion |
|---|---|---|---|---|---|---|---|---|---|---|
| 1 | Legia Warsaw II (C, P) | 34 | 27 | 3 | 4 | 82 | 29 | +53 | 84 | Promotion to II liga |
| 2 | ŁKS Łomża (Q) | 34 | 22 | 5 | 7 | 77 | 31 | +46 | 71 | Qualification to the promotion play-offs |
| 3 | Warta Sieradz | 34 | 21 | 8 | 5 | 64 | 34 | +30 | 71 | |
| 4 | Wigry Suwałki | 34 | 20 | 5 | 9 | 64 | 43 | +21 | 65 | |
| 5 | KS CK Troszyn | 34 | 17 | 6 | 11 | 75 | 47 | +28 | 57 | |
| 6 | Wisła Płock II | 34 | 16 | 8 | 10 | 56 | 51 | +5 | 56 | |
| 7 | Widzew Łódź II | 34 | 17 | 3 | 14 | 70 | 64 | +6 | 54 | |
| 8 | Jagiellonia Białystok II | 34 | 14 | 7 | 13 | 46 | 45 | +1 | 49 | |
| 9 | Lechia Tomaszów Mazowiecki | 34 | 13 | 8 | 13 | 64 | 55 | +9 | 47 | |
| 10 | Ząbkovia Ząbki | 34 | 13 | 5 | 16 | 72 | 64 | +8 | 44 | |
| 11 | Świt Nowy Dwór Mazowiecki | 34 | 12 | 5 | 17 | 51 | 66 | −15 | 41 | |
| 12 | Mławianka Mława | 34 | 11 | 7 | 16 | 55 | 59 | −4 | 40 | |
| 13 | Olimpia Elbląg | 34 | 10 | 8 | 16 | 45 | 61 | −16 | 38 | |
| 14 | GKS Wikielec (R) | 34 | 10 | 7 | 17 | 40 | 54 | −14 | 37 | Relegation to IV liga |
| 15 | Broń Radom (R) | 34 | 9 | 9 | 16 | 40 | 57 | −17 | 36 | Relegation to IV liga |
| 16 | GKS Bełchatów (R) | 34 | 9 | 7 | 18 | 50 | 76 | −26 | 34 | Relegation to IV liga |
| 17 | KS Wasilków (R) | 34 | 7 | 4 | 23 | 40 | 79 | −39 | 25 | Relegation to IV liga |
| 18 | Znicz Biała Piska (R) | 34 | 4 | 3 | 27 | 27 | 103 | −76 | 15 | Relegation to IV liga |

Source: 90minut.pl Soccerway
Rules for classification: 1. Number of points reached in the entire series of games; 2. Number of points reached in direct matches; 3. Goal difference in direct matches; 4. Goal difference in direct matches – away goals counted twice; 5. Goal difference in the whole series of games; 6. Number of goals scored in the entire series of games.
(C) Champions; (P) Promoted; (Q) Qualified for the phase indicated; (R) Relegated

===== Group 2 =====
| Pos | Team | Pld | W | D | L | GF | GA | GD | Pts | Promotion |
|---|---|---|---|---|---|---|---|---|---|---|
| 1 | Zawisza Bydgoszcz (C, P) | 34 | 25 | 5 | 4 | 73 | 23 | +50 | 80 | Promotion to II liga |
| 2 | Wikęd Luzino (Q) | 34 | 24 | 4 | 6 | 79 | 39 | +40 | 76 | Qualification to the promotion play-offs |
| 3 | Polonia Środa Wielkopolska | 34 | 20 | 6 | 8 | 67 | 43 | +24 | 66 | |
| 4 | Lipno Stęszew | 34 | 15 | 6 | 13 | 47 | 54 | −7 | 51 | |
| 5 | Noteć Czarnków | 34 | 14 | 7 | 13 | 49 | 46 | +3 | 49 | |
| 6 | Elana Toruń | 34 | 14 | 7 | 13 | 49 | 55 | −6 | 49 | |
| 7 | Lech Poznań II | 34 | 14 | 7 | 13 | 67 | 54 | +13 | 49 | |
| 8 | Flota Świnoujście | 34 | 14 | 7 | 13 | 48 | 52 | −4 | 49 | |
| 9 | Wda Świecie | 34 | 14 | 6 | 14 | 44 | 66 | −22 | 48 | |
| 10 | Unia Swarzędz | 34 | 13 | 8 | 13 | 47 | 41 | +6 | 47 | |
| 11 | Kluczevia Stargard | 34 | 13 | 7 | 14 | 54 | 43 | +11 | 46 | |
| 12 | Błękitni Stargard | 34 | 12 | 9 | 13 | 56 | 51 | +5 | 45 | |
| 13 | Victoria Września | 34 | 13 | 3 | 18 | 41 | 46 | −5 | 42 | |
| 14 | Pogoń Szczecin II (R) | 34 | 12 | 5 | 17 | 75 | 66 | +9 | 41 | Relegation to IV liga |
| 15 | Pogoń Nowe Skalmierzyce (R) | 34 | 10 | 9 | 15 | 35 | 46 | −11 | 39 | Relegation to IV liga |
| 16 | Cartusia Kartuzy (R) | 34 | 11 | 5 | 18 | 38 | 51 | −13 | 38 | Relegation to IV liga |
| 17 | Tłuchovia Tłuchowo (R) | 34 | 8 | 7 | 19 | 37 | 66 | −29 | 31 | Relegation to IV liga |
| 18 | Wybrzeże Rewalskie Rewal (R) | 34 | 3 | 6 | 25 | 20 | 84 | −64 | 15 | Relegation to IV liga |

Source: 90minut.pl Soccerway
Rules for classification: 1. Number of points reached in the entire series of games; 2. Number of points reached in direct matches; 3. Goal difference in direct matches; 4. Goal difference in direct matches – away goals counted twice; 5. Goal difference in the whole series of games; 6. Number of goals scored in the entire series of games.
(C) Champions; (P) Promoted; (Q) Qualified for the phase indicated; (R) Relegated

===== Group 3 =====
| Pos | Team | Pld | W | D | L | GF | GA | GD | Pts | Promotion |
|---|---|---|---|---|---|---|---|---|---|---|
| 1 | Lechia Zielona Góra (C, P) | 34 | 21 | 10 | 3 | 77 | 17 | +60 | 73 | Promotion to II liga |
| 2 | Górnik Polkowice (Q) | 34 | 20 | 7 | 7 | 64 | 42 | +22 | 67 | Qualification to the promotion play-offs |
| 3 | Sparta Katowice | 34 | 18 | 8 | 8 | 53 | 34 | +19 | 62 | |
| 4 | Skra Częstochowa | 34 | 17 | 8 | 9 | 68 | 56 | +12 | 59 | |
| 5 | Zagłębie Lubin II | 34 | 17 | 6 | 11 | 77 | 61 | +16 | 57 | |
| 6 | KS Goczałkowice-Zdrój | 34 | 15 | 9 | 10 | 49 | 46 | +3 | 54 | |
| 7 | MKS Kluczbork | 34 | 15 | 7 | 12 | 67 | 43 | +24 | 52 | |
| 8 | Warta Gorzów Wielkopolski | 34 | 15 | 7 | 12 | 54 | 47 | +7 | 52 | |
| 9 | Górnik Zabrze II | 34 | 15 | 6 | 13 | 73 | 44 | +29 | 51 | |
| 10 | Ślęza Wrocław | 34 | 14 | 7 | 13 | 49 | 57 | −8 | 49 | |
| 11 | Słowianin Wolibórz | 34 | 13 | 9 | 12 | 48 | 49 | −1 | 48 | |
| 12 | Carina Gubin | 34 | 12 | 11 | 11 | 50 | 51 | −1 | 47 | |
| 13 | Miedź Legnica II | 34 | 13 | 7 | 14 | 63 | 58 | +5 | 46 | |
| 14 | Karkonosze Jelenia Góra | 34 | 12 | 9 | 13 | 57 | 56 | +1 | 45 | |
| 15 | Polonia Nysa (R) | 34 | 9 | 10 | 15 | 51 | 58 | −7 | 37 | Relegation to IV liga |
| 16 | LZS Starowice Dolne (R) | 34 | 7 | 6 | 21 | 33 | 81 | −48 | 27 | Relegation to IV liga |
| 17 | Pniówek Pawłowice (R) | 34 | 5 | 4 | 25 | 28 | 77 | −49 | 19 | Relegation to IV liga |
| 18 | Stal Jasień (Note: Stal Jasień has withdrawn from the competition after 19th round.) (R) | 34 | 2 | 1 | 31 | 21 | 105 | −84 | 7 | Withdrawn from the league |

Source: 90minut.pl Soccerway
Rules for classification: 1. Number of points reached in the entire series of games; 2. Number of points reached in direct matches; 3. Goal difference in direct matches; 4. Goal difference in direct matches – away goals counted twice; 5. Goal difference in the whole series of games; 6. Number of goals scored in the entire series of games.
(C) Champions; (P) Promoted; (Q) Qualified for the phase indicated; (R) Relegated

===== Group 4 =====
| Pos | Team | Pld | W | D | L | GF | GA | GD | Pts | Promotion |
|---|---|---|---|---|---|---|---|---|---|---|
| 1 | Avia Świdnik (C, P) | 34 | 23 | 8 | 3 | 84 | 35 | +49 | 77 | Promotion to II liga |
| 2 | KSZO Ostrowiec Świętokrzyski (Q) | 34 | 22 | 8 | 4 | 66 | 30 | +36 | 74 | Qualification to the promotion play-offs |
| 3 | Chełmianka Chełm | 34 | 21 | 9 | 4 | 65 | 31 | +34 | 72 | |
| 4 | Star Starachowice | 34 | 15 | 10 | 9 | 51 | 43 | +8 | 55 | |
| 5 | Korona Kielce II | 34 | 18 | 4 | 12 | 66 | 59 | +7 | 58 | |
| 6 | Czarni Połaniec | 34 | 16 | 5 | 13 | 59 | 49 | +10 | 53 | |
| 7 | Podlasie Biała Podlaska | 34 | 14 | 10 | 10 | 60 | 48 | +12 | 52 | |
| 8 | Pogoń-Sokół Lubaczów | 34 | 14 | 9 | 11 | 61 | 45 | +16 | 51 | |
| 9 | Wiślanie Skawina | 34 | 15 | 6 | 13 | 52 | 51 | +1 | 51 | |
| 10 | Wisłoka Dębica | 34 | 12 | 12 | 10 | 37 | 35 | +2 | 48 | |
| 11 | Wisła Kraków II | 34 | 15 | 4 | 15 | 67 | 58 | +9 | 49 | |
| 12 | Siarka Tarnobrzeg | 34 | 11 | 10 | 13 | 59 | 52 | +7 | 43 | |
| 13 | Naprzód Jędrzejów | 34 | 11 | 5 | 18 | 45 | 55 | −10 | 38 | |
| 14 | Sokół Kolbuszowa Dolna | 34 | 11 | 4 | 19 | 36 | 54 | −18 | 37 | |
| 15 | Stal Kraśnik (R) | 34 | 9 | 7 | 18 | 42 | 52 | −10 | 34 | Relegation to IV liga |
| 16 | Cracovia II (R) | 34 | 9 | 6 | 19 | 44 | 71 | −27 | 33 | Relegation to IV liga |
| 17 | Świdniczanka Świdnik (R) | 34 | 5 | 4 | 25 | 35 | 80 | −45 | 19 | Relegation to IV liga |
| 18 | Sparta Kazimierza Wielka (R) | 34 | 4 | 1 | 29 | 29 | 110 | −81 | 13 | Relegation to IV liga |

Updated to match(es) played on unknown. Source: 90minut.pl Soccerway
Rules for classification: 1. Number of points reached in the entire series of games; 2. Number of points reached in direct matches; 3. Goal difference in direct matches; 4. Goal difference in direct matches – away goals counted twice; 5. Goal difference in the whole series of games; 6. Number of goals scored in the entire series of games.
(C) Champions; (P) Promoted; (Q) Qualified for the phase indicated; (R) Relegated

=== Cup competitions ===
==== Polish Cup ====
2 May 2026
16:00 CEST (UTC+02:00)

| Górnik Zabrze | 2–0 | Raków Częstochowa |
|---|---|---|
| Massimo 32'; Khlan 65' | 90minut Łączy nas piłka |

Stadion Narodowy, Warsaw
Attendance: 50,072
Referee: Jarosław Przybył (Kluczbork)

==== Polish Super Cup ====
13 July 2025
18:00 CEST (UTC+02:00)

| Lech Poznań | 1–2 | Legia Warsaw |
|---|---|---|
| Szymczak 81' | 90minut.pl PZPN | Wszołek 33'; Shkurin 43' |

Enea Stadion, Poznań
Attendance: 40,368
Referee: Łukasz Kuźma (Białystok)

== UEFA competitions ==
=== UEFA Champions League ===
==== Qualifying phase and play-off round ====
===== Second qualifying round =====
| Team 1 | Agg. | Team 2 | 1st leg | 2nd leg |
|---|---|---|---|---|
| Lech Poznań (Poland) | 8–1 | (Iceland) Breiðablik | 7–1 | 1–0 |

===== Third qualifying round =====
| Team 1 | Agg. | Team 2 | 1st leg | 2nd leg |
|---|---|---|---|---|
| Lech Poznań (Poland) | 2–4 | (Serbia) Red Star Belgrade | 1–3 | 1–1 |

=== UEFA Europa League ===
==== Qualifying phase and play-off round ====
===== First qualifying round =====
| Team 1 | Agg. | Team 2 | 1st leg | 2nd leg |
|---|---|---|---|---|
| Legia Warsaw (Poland) | 2–0 | (Kazakhstan) Aktobe | 1–0 | 1–0 |

===== Second qualifying round =====
| Team 1 | Agg. | Team 2 | 1st leg | 2nd leg |
|---|---|---|---|---|
| Baník Ostrava (Czech Republic) | 3–4 | (Poland) Legia Warsaw | 2–2 | 1–2 |

===== Third qualifying round =====
| Team 1 | Agg. | Team 2 | 1st leg | 2nd leg |
|---|---|---|---|---|
| AEK Larnaca (Cyprus) | 5–3 | (Poland) Legia Warsaw | 4–1 | 1–2 |

===== Play-off round =====
| Team 1 | Agg. | Team 2 | 1st leg | 2nd leg |
|---|---|---|---|---|
| Lech Poznań (Poland) | 3–6 | (Belgium) Genk | 1–5 | 2–1 |

=== UEFA Conference League ===
==== Qualifying phase and play-off round ====
===== Second qualifying round =====
| Team 1 | Agg. | Team 2 | 1st leg | 2nd leg |
|---|---|---|---|---|
| Raków Częstochowa (Poland) | 6–1 | (Slovakia) Žilina | 3–0 | 3–1 |
| Novi Pazar (Serbia) | 2–5 | (Poland) Jagiellonia Białystok | 1–2 | 1–3 |

===== Third qualifying round =====
| Team 1 | Agg. | Team 2 | 1st leg | 2nd leg |
|---|---|---|---|---|
| Raków Częstochowa (Poland) | 2–1 | (Israel) Maccabi Haifa | 0–1 | 2–0 |
| Silkeborg (Denmark) | 2–3 | (Poland) Jagiellonia Białystok | 0–1 | 2–2 |

===== Play-off round =====
| Team 1 | Agg. | Team 2 | 1st leg | 2nd leg |
|---|---|---|---|---|
| Jagiellonia Białystok (Poland) | 4–1 | (Albania) Dinamo City | 3–0 | 1–1 |
| Raków Częstochowa (Poland) | 3–1 | (Bulgaria) Arda | 1–0 | 2–1 |
| Hibernian (Scotland) | 4–5 | (Poland) Legia Warsaw | 1–2 | 3–3 (a.e.t.) |

==== League phase ====
===== Jagiellonia Białystok =====
| Pos | Team | Pld | W | D | L | GF | GA | GD | Pts | Qualification |
|---|---|---|---|---|---|---|---|---|---|---|
| 15 | (Italian Football Federation) Fiorentina | 6 | 3 | 0 | 3 | 8 | 5 | +3 | 9 | Advance to knockout phase play-offs (seeded) |
| 16 | (Croatian Football Federation) Rijeka | 6 | 2 | 3 | 1 | 5 | 2 | +3 | 9 | Advance to knockout phase play-offs (seeded) |
| 17 | (Polish Football Association) Jagiellonia Białystok | 6 | 2 | 3 | 1 | 5 | 4 | +1 | 9 | Advance to knockout phase play-offs (unseeded) |
| 18 | (Cyprus Football Association) Omonia | 6 | 2 | 2 | 2 | 5 | 4 | +1 | 8 | Advance to knockout phase play-offs (unseeded) |
| 19 | (Football Federation of Armenia) Noah | 6 | 2 | 2 | 2 | 6 | 7 | −1 | 8 | Advance to knockout phase play-offs (unseeded) |

Source: UEFA
Rules for classification: League phase tiebreakers

| Home team | Score | Away team |
|---|---|---|
| Jagiellonia Białystok (Poland) | 1–0 | (Malta) Hamrun Spartans |
| Strasbourg (France) | 1–1 | (Poland) Jagiellonia Białystok |
| Shkëndija (North Macedonia) | 1–1 | (Poland) Jagiellonia Białystok |
| Jagiellonia Białystok (Poland) | 1–0 | (Finland) KuPS |
| Jagiellonia Białystok (Poland) | 1–2 | (Spain) Rayo Vallecano |
| AZ (Netherlands) | 0–0 | (Poland) Jagiellonia Białystok |

===== Lech Poznań =====
| Pos | Team | Pld | W | D | L | GF | GA | GD | Pts | Qualification |
|---|---|---|---|---|---|---|---|---|---|---|
| 9 | (Swiss Football Association) Lausanne-Sport | 6 | 3 | 2 | 1 | 6 | 3 | +3 | 11 | Advance to knockout phase play-offs (seeded) |
| 10 | (The Football Association) Crystal Palace | 6 | 3 | 1 | 2 | 11 | 6 | +5 | 10 | Advance to knockout phase play-offs (seeded) |
| 11 | (Polish Football Association) Lech Poznań | 6 | 3 | 1 | 2 | 12 | 8 | +4 | 10 | Advance to knockout phase play-offs (seeded) |
| 12 | (Turkish Football Federation) Samsunspor | 6 | 3 | 1 | 2 | 10 | 6 | +4 | 10 | Advance to knockout phase play-offs (seeded) |
| 13 | (Football Association of Slovenia) Celje | 6 | 3 | 1 | 2 | 8 | 7 | +1 | 10 | Advance to knockout phase play-offs (seeded) |

Source: UEFA
Rules for classification: League phase tiebreakers

| Home team | Score | Away team |
|---|---|---|
| Lech Poznań (Poland) | 4–1 | (Austria) Rapid Wien |
| Lincoln Red Imps (Gibraltar) | 2–1 | (Poland) Lech Poznań |
| Rayo Vallecano (Spain) | 3–2 | (Poland) Lech Poznań |
| Lech Poznań (Poland) | 2–0 | (Switzerland) Lausanne-Sport |
| Lech Poznań (Poland) | 1–1 | (Germany) Mainz 05 |
| Sigma Olomouc (Czech Republic) | 1–2 | (Poland) Lech Poznań |

===== Legia Warsaw =====
| Pos | Team | Pld | W | D | L | GF | GA | GD | Pts |
|---|---|---|---|---|---|---|---|---|---|
| 26 | (Gibraltar Football Association) Lincoln Red Imps | 6 | 2 | 1 | 3 | 7 | 15 | −8 | 7 |
| 27 | (Ukrainian Association of Football) Dynamo Kyiv | 6 | 2 | 0 | 4 | 9 | 9 | 0 | 6 |
| 28 | (Polish Football Association) Legia Warsaw | 6 | 2 | 0 | 4 | 8 | 8 | 0 | 6 |
| 29 | (Slovak Football Association) Slovan Bratislava | 6 | 2 | 0 | 4 | 5 | 9 | −4 | 6 |
| 30 | (Football Association of Iceland) Breiðablik | 6 | 1 | 2 | 3 | 6 | 11 | −5 | 5 |

Source: UEFA
Rules for classification: League phase tiebreakers

| Home team | Score | Away team |
|---|---|---|
| Legia Warsaw (Poland) | 0–1 | (Turkey) Samsunspor |
| Shakhtar Donetsk (Ukraine) | 1–2 | (Poland) Legia Warsaw |
| Celje (Slovenia) | 2–1 | (Poland) Legia Warsaw |
| Legia Warsaw (Poland) | 0–1 | (Czech Republic) Sparta Prague |
| Noah (Armenia) | 2–1 | (Poland) Legia Warsaw |
| Legia Warsaw (Poland) | 4–1 | (Gibraltar) Lincoln Red Imps |

===== Raków Częstochowa =====
| Pos | Team | Pld | W | D | L | GF | GA | GD | Pts | Qualification |
|---|---|---|---|---|---|---|---|---|---|---|
| 1 | (French Football Federation) Strasbourg | 6 | 5 | 1 | 0 | 11 | 5 | +6 | 16 | Advance to round of 16 (seeded) |
| 2 | (Polish Football Association) Raków Częstochowa | 6 | 4 | 2 | 0 | 9 | 2 | +7 | 14 | Advance to round of 16 (seeded) |
| 3 | (Hellenic Football Federation) AEK Athens | 6 | 4 | 1 | 1 | 14 | 7 | +7 | 13 | Advance to round of 16 (seeded) |
| 4 | (Football Association of the Czech Republic) Sparta Prague | 6 | 4 | 1 | 1 | 10 | 3 | +7 | 13 | Advance to round of 16 (seeded) |
| 5 | (Royal Spanish Football Federation) Rayo Vallecano | 6 | 4 | 1 | 1 | 13 | 7 | +6 | 13 | Advance to round of 16 (seeded) |

Source: UEFA
Rules for classification: League phase tiebreakers

| Home team | Score | Away team |
|---|---|---|
| Raków Częstochowa (Poland) | 2–0 | (Romania) Universitatea Craiova |
| Sigma Olomouc (Czech Republic) | 1–1 | (Poland) Raków Częstochowa |
| Sparta Prague (Czech Republic) | 0–0 | (Poland) Raków Częstochowa |
| Raków Częstochowa (Poland) | 4–1 | (Austria) Rapid Wien |
| Raków Częstochowa (Poland) | 1–0 | (Bosnia and Herzegovina) Zrinjski Mostar |
| Omonia (Cyprus) | 0–1 | (Poland) Raków Częstochowa |

==== Knockout phase ====
===== Knockout phase play-offs =====
| Team 1 | Agg. | Team 2 | 1st leg | 2nd leg |
|---|---|---|---|---|
| KuPS (Finland) | 0–3 | (Poland) Lech Poznań | 0–2 | 0–1 |
| Jagiellonia Białystok (Poland) | 4–5 | (Italy) Fiorentina | 0–3 | 4–2 (a.e.t.) |

===== Round of 16 =====
| Team 1 | Agg. | Team 2 | 1st leg | 2nd leg |
|---|---|---|---|---|
| Lech Poznań (Poland) | 3–4 | (Ukraine) Shakhtar Donetsk | 1–3 | 2–1 |
| Fiorentina (Italy) | 4–2 | (Poland) Raków Częstochowa | 2–1 | 2–1 |

== National teams ==
=== Poland national football team ===
==== Results and fixtures ====
===== Friendlies =====
| 9 October 2025 Friendly | Poland | 1–0 | New Zealand | Chorzów, Poland |
| 20:45 CEST (UTC+2) | Zieliński 49' | Report (FIFA); Report (UEFA) | | Stadium: Silesian Stadium; Attendance: 30,412; Referee: Erik Lambrechts (Belgium) |

| 31 May 2026 Friendly | Poland | 0–2 | Ukraine | Wrocław, Poland |
| 17:30 CEST (UTC+2) | | Report (FIFA); Report (UEFA) | Yaremchuk 34'; Yarmolenko 44' | Stadium: Wrocław Stadium; Attendance: 37,904; Referee: Filip Glova (Slovakia) |

| 3 June 2026 Friendly | Poland | 2–2 | Nigeria | Warsaw, Poland |
| 20:45 CEST (UTC+2) | Potulski 45+1'; Wiśniewski 90+5' | Report (FIFA); Report (UEFA) | Moffi 23'; Onuachu 77' (pen.) | Stadium: Stadion Narodowy; Attendance: 54,408; Referee: Marian Barbu (Romania) |

===== 2026 FIFA World Cup qualification =====
====== Group G ======
| Pos | Team | Pld | W | D | L | GF | GA | GD | Pts | Qualification | (Netherlands national football team) | (Poland national football team) | (Finland national football team) | (Malta national football team) | (Lithuania national football team) |
|---|---|---|---|---|---|---|---|---|---|---|---|---|---|---|---|
| 1 | Netherlands | 8 | 6 | 2 | 0 | 27 | 4 | +23 | 20 | Qualification for 2026 FIFA World Cup | — | 1–1 | 4–0 | 8–0 | 4–0 |
| 2 | Poland | 8 | 5 | 2 | 1 | 14 | 7 | +7 | 17 | Advance to play-offs | 1–1 | — | 3–1 | 2–0 | 1–0 |
| 3 | Finland | 8 | 3 | 1 | 4 | 8 | 14 | −6 | 10 | | 0–2 | 2–1 | — | 0–1 | 2–1 |
| 4 | Malta | 8 | 1 | 2 | 5 | 4 | 19 | −15 | 5 | | 0–4 | 2–3 | 0–1 | — | 0–0 |
| 5 | Lithuania | 8 | 0 | 3 | 5 | 6 | 15 | −9 | 3 | | 2–3 | 0–2 | 2–2 | 1–1 | — |

Source: FIFA, UEFA

| 4 September 2025 2026 FIFA World Cup qualification | Netherlands | 1–1 | Poland | Rotterdam, Netherlands |
| 20:45 CEST (UTC+2) | Dumfries 28' | Report (FIFA); Report (UEFA) | Cash 80' | Stadium: De Kuip; Attendance: 40,904; Referee: Simone Sozza (Italy) |

| 7 September 2025 2026 FIFA World Cup qualification | Poland | 3–1 | Finland | Chorzów, Poland |
| 20:45 CEST (UTC+2) | Cash 27'; Lewandowski 45+2'; Kamiński 54' | Report (FIFA); Report (UEFA) | Källman 88' | Stadium: Silesian Stadium; Attendance: 50,897; Referee: Rade Obrenović (Slovenia) |

| 12 October 2025 2026 FIFA World Cup qualification | Lithuania | 0–2 | Poland | Kaunas, Lithuania |
| 20:45 CEST (UTC+2) | | Report (FIFA); Report (UEFA) | Szymański 15'; Lewandowski 64' | Stadium: Darius and Girėnas Stadium; Attendance: 11,741; Referee: Ondřej Berka (Czech Republic) |

| 14 November 2025 2026 FIFA World Cup qualification | Poland | 1–1 | Netherlands | Warsaw, Poland |
| 20:45 CET (UTC+1) | Kamiński 43' | Report (FIFA); Report (UEFA) | Depay 47' | Stadium: Stadion Narodowy; Attendance: 56,278; Referee: Maurizio Mariani (Italy) |

| 17 November 2025 2026 FIFA World Cup qualification | Malta | 2–3 | Poland | Ta' Qali, Malta |
| 20:45 CET (UTC+1) | Cardona 36'; Teuma 68' (pen.) | Report (FIFA); Report (UEFA) | Lewandowski 32'; Wszołek 59'; Zieliński 85' | Stadium: National Stadium; Attendance: 10,326; Referee: Igor Pajač (Croatia) |

====== Play-offs ======
Semi-finals
26 March 2026 – Valencia
Ukraine | 1
Sweden | 3
26 March 2026 – Warsaw
Poland | 2
Albania | 1

Final
31 March 2026 – Solna
Sweden | 3
Poland | 2

| 26 March 2026 Play-offs semi-final | Poland | 2–1 | Albania | Warsaw, Poland |
| 20:45 CET (UTC+1) | Lewandowski 63'; Zieliński 73' | Report (FIFA); Report (UEFA) | Hoxha 42' | Stadium: Stadion Narodowy; Attendance: 56,412; Referee: Anthony Taylor (England) |

| 31 March 2026 Play-offs final | Sweden | 3–2 | Poland | Solna, Sweden |
| 20:45 CEST (UTC+2) | Elanga 20'; Lagerbielke 44'; Gyökeres 88' | Report (FIFA); Report (UEFA) | Zalewski 33'; Świderski 55' | Stadium: Nationalarenan; Attendance: 49,627; Referee: Slavko Vinčić (Slovenia) |
