= Oskar Fürst =

Polish footballer

Personal information
- Full name: Oskar Fürst
- Date of birth: 10 March 2000 (age 26)
- Place of birth: Bydgoszcz, Poland
- Height: 1.84 m (6 ft 0 in)
- Position: Winger

Youth career
- –2016: Zawisza Bydgoszcz
- 2016–2019: Pogoń Szczecin

Senior career*
Years	Team	Apps	(Gls)
2017–2019	Pogoń Szczecin II	28	(2)
2019–2021	Wigry Suwałki	9	(0)
2020	→ Znicz Biała Piska (loan)	1	(0)
2021–2022	Zawisza Bydgoszcz	20	(1)
2022	Unia Solec Kujawski	3	(0)
2023	Noteć Łabiszyn	13	(7)
- * Club domestic league appearances and goals as of 22:05, 18 July 2024 (UTC)

Oskar Fürst (born 10 March 2000) is a Polish professional footballer who plays as a winger.

== Career ==
=== Club career ===
Fürst started his career at Zawisza Bydgoszcz, but later joined the academy of Pogoń Szczecin in July 2016, having attracted attention from the club after he scored against Pogoń Szczecin in the youth ranks. During his time in Pogoń Szczecin, he played alternately for the U-19 team as well as the reserve team, which played in the III liga. However, he never made his debut for the first team before his departure in the summer of 2019.

On 2 July 2019, Fürst moved to Polish I liga club Wigry Suwałki, where he signed a two-year contract with a one-year extension option. He made his debut for the club on 27 July 2019 against Chojniczanka Chojnice in the I liga. after playing only seven matches (129 minutes) during the first six months, he was loaned out to Znicz Biała Piska in January 2020 for the rest of the season. After returning to Wigry, who incidentally were relegated to the II liga for the 2020–21 season, he was only used in four games, which is why he left the club at the end of the year.

In January 2021, Fürst returned to his boyhood club, Zawisza Bydgoszcz.

On 4 August 2022, he moved to another III liga side, Unia Solec Kujawski.
