= Mateusz Kuzimski =

Polish footballer

Personal information
- Full name: Mateusz Kuzimski
- Date of birth: 26 June 1991 (age 35)
- Place of birth: Tczew, Poland
- Height: 1.79 m (5 ft 10 in)
- Position: Forward

Team information
- Current team: Polonia Lidzbark Warmiński
- Number: 7

Youth career
- Unia Tczew
- –2009: Wisła Tczew

Senior career*
| Years | Team | Apps | (Gls) |
| 2009–2011 | Gryf 2009 Tczew | | |
| 2011–2012 | Miedź Legnica | 6 | (0) |
| 2012–2013 | Gryf 2009 Tczew | | |
| 2013–2014 | Cambridge City | | |
| 2014–2015 | Histon | 18 | (6) |
| 2015 | Bałtyk Gdynia | 12 | (11) |
| 2015–2016 | Gryf Wejherowo | 28 | (6) |
| 2016–2018 | Bałtyk Gdynia | 62 | (34) |
| 2018–2019 | Bytovia Bytów | 33 | (8) |
| 2019–2020 | Chojniczanka Chojnice | 30 | (15) |
| 2020–2022 | Warta Poznań | 51 | (8) |
| 2022–2023 | Arka Gdynia | 20 | (2) |
| 2023–2024 | Radunia Stężyca | 40 | (21) |
| 2024–2025 | Olimpia Elbląg | 18 | (3) |
| 2025 | Hutnik Kraków | 15 | (5) |
| 2025– | Polonia Lidzbark Warmiński | 21 | (11) |
- * Club domestic league appearances and goals as of 20:56, 25 June 2026 (UTC)

Mateusz Kuzimski (born 26 June 1991) is a Polish professional footballer who plays as a forward for III liga club Polonia Lidzbark Warmiński.

== Professional career ==
Born in Tczew, Kuzimski began his career with Unia Tczew, but suffered a knee injury in his early 20s. After moving to England to work in a food packing warehouse, he attended a trial for uncontracted players, and after a second trial signed for Cambridge City, before moving to Histon He played 30 times for Histon, scoring four goals, before returning to Poland with Bałtyk Gdynia.

Kuzimski then signed for Chojniczanka Chojnice, finishing second-top scorer in the 2019–20 I liga.

In the summer of 2020, he signed for Ekstraklasa side Warta Poznań.

On 25 February 2022, he joined I liga club Arka Gdynia on a year-and-a-half deal. He left the club by mutual consent on 3 January 2023.

On 25 January of that year, he signed with II liga side Radunia Stężyca. He was released by the club at the end of the 2023–24 season.

On 12 July 2024, Kuzimski joined another II liga outfit Olimpia Elbląg. On 7 February 2025, he left the club.

On 21 February 2025, Kuzimski signed with third-tier club Hutnik Kraków.

On 28 August 2025, Kuzimski signed with fifth-tier club Polonia Lidzbark Warmiński.

== Honours ==
Polonia Lidzbark Warmiński

- IV liga Warmia-Masuria: 2025–26

Individual

- III liga, group II top scorer: 2017–18
