= Yan Senkevich =

Belarusian footballer (born 1995)

Personal information
- Date of birth: 18 February 1995 (age 31)
- Place of birth: Grodno, Belarus
- Height: 1.81 m (5 ft 11 1/2 in)
- Position: Midfielder

Team information
- Current team: Polonia Lidzbark Warmiński
- Number: 17

Youth career
- 2012: Belcard Grodno
- 2013–2014: Neman Grodno

Senior career*
Years	Team	Apps	(Gls)
2012	Belcard Grodno	1	(0)
2015–2017	Neman Grodno	8	(0)
2017	→ Granit Mikashevichi (loan)	29	(11)
2018	Dnepr Mogilev	23	(0)
2019	Smolevichi	8	(2)
2019	→ Sputnik Rechitsa (loan)	15	(4)
2020	Lida	12	(10)
2020	Gorodeya	7	(2)
2021	Smorgon	10	(0)
2021–2025	Olimpia Elbląg	97	(18)
2025–	Polonia Lidzbark Warmiński	39	(2)
- * Club domestic league appearances and goals as of 20:58, 25 June 2026 (UTC)

Yan Senkevich (Belarusian: Ян Сянкевіч; Russian: Ян Сенкевич; born 18 February 1995) is a Belarusian professional footballer who plays as a midfielder for III liga club Polonia Lidzbark Warmiński.

== Honours ==
Polonia Lidzbark Warmiński

- IV liga Warmia-Masuria: 2025–26
