= Tomasz Swędrowski =

Polish footballer (born 1993)

Personal information
- Date of birth: 25 November 1993 (age 32)
- Place of birth: Zduńska Wola, Poland
- Height: 1.73 m (5 ft 8 in)
- Position: Midfielder

Team information
- Current team: Warta Sieradz

Youth career
- Warta Sieradz
- Gatta Zduńska Wola

Senior career*
| Years | Team | Apps | (Gls) |
| 2010–2011 | Warta Sieradz | 55 | (1) |
| 2012–2017 | MKS Kluczbork | 126 | (12) |
| 2017–2018 | Stal Mielec | 21 | (0) |
| 2019 | Bytovia Bytów | 7 | (0) |
| 2019–2022 | Motor Lublin | 70 | (20) |
| 2022–2024 | Ruch Chorzów | 45 | (9) |
| 2024–2026 | Wieczysta Kraków | 58 | (5) |
| 2026 | Wieczysta Kraków II | 9 | (5) |
| 2026– | Warta Sieradz | 0 | (0) |
- * Club domestic league appearances and goals as of 21:07, 31 May 2026 (UTC)

Tomasz Swędrowski (born 25 November 1993) is a Polish professional footballer who plays as a midfielder for III liga club Warta Sieradz. He has previously played professionally for MKS Kluczbork, Stal Mielec, Bytovia Bytów, Motor Lublin, Ruch Chorzów and Wieczysta Kraków.

== Club career ==
Swędrowski began his football career at Warta Sieradz, making his first team debut on 13 March 2010 at age 16, coming on as a 76th-minute substitute. In January 2012, he joined II liga club MKS Kluczbork, and made his professional debut on 17 March 2012 in a 2–1 away win against Elana Toruń In his fourth season Swędrowski made 31 league appearances for MKS, scoring five goals, and helping them win promotion to I liga.

In June 2017, Swędrowski joined I liga side Stal Mielec. He spent one-and-a-half years with Stal, and featured primarily as a substitute. In January 2019, he signed a half-year contract with Bytovia Bytów

On 18 July 2019, Swędrowski moved to Motor Lublin.

On 2 June 2022, it was announced he would join freshly promoted I liga side Ruch Chorzów on a two-year deal. He was a key figure behind Ruch's promotion to Ekstraklasa in 2023, and appeared in every league game of the 2023–24 season, before making a move to III liga club Wieczysta Kraków on 22 January 2024. He was part of the team that won three consecutive promotions, from the fourth tier to the Ekstraklasa.

On 2 July 2026, Swędrowski returned to Warta Sieradz, now playing in the fourth division.

== Honours ==
MKS Kluczbork

- II liga: 2014–15

Motor Lublin

- III liga, group IV: 2019–20
- Polish Cup (Lublin subdistrict regionals): 2019–20

Wieczysta Kraków

- III liga, group IV: 2023–24

Wieczysta Kraków II

- IV liga Lesser Poland: 2025–26
