= Konrad Nowak (footballer, born 1985) =

Polish footballer

Personal information
- Date of birth: 17 March 1985 (age 41)
- Place of birth: Lublin, Poland
- Height: 1.74 m (5 ft 9 in)
- Position: Striker

Senior career*
Years	Team	Apps	(Gls)
2002	Wieniawa Lublin		
2003	Lublinianka		
2003	Górnik Łęczna	1	(0)
2004–2006	Motor Lublin		
2006–2007	Jagiellonia Białystok	5	(0)
2008	Avia Świdnik	8	(0)
2008–2009	Stal Kraśnik	24	(14)
2009–2017	Wisła Puławy	218	(85)
2017–2019	Motor Lublin	56	(23)
2019–2021	Lewart Lubartów	36	(13)
2021–2022	Piaskovia Piaski	17	(6)
- * Club domestic league appearances and goals

Konrad Nowak (born 17 March 1985) is a Polish former professional footballer who played as a striker. He formerly played for Lublinianka, Górnik Łęczna, Jagiellonia Białystok, Avia Świdnik, Wisła Puławy, and Motor Lublin.

== Career ==
Nowak began his career at Wieniawa Lublin. He made his professional debut for Górnik Łęczna on 30 October 2003 against Wisła Kraków, coming on as an 80th-minute substitute. In 2004 he moved to Motor Lublin, where he played until the end of the 2005–06 season. In July 2006, Nowak joined II liga club Jagiellonia Białystok. He played 8 games for Avia Świdnik before signing for Stal Kraśnik in the same year of 2008.

Ahead of the 2009–10 season, Nowak signed for fourth-tier Wisła Puławy. In his second season Nowak made 26 league appearances for Wisła, scoring 17 goals, and helping them win promotion to II liga. In the 2015–16 season, he became part of the squad that earned promotion to I liga for the first time in club's history. In his eight years in the Wisła first team, Nowak made a total of 225 appearances in all competitions, scoring 89 goals.

On 3 July 2017, Nowak signed for III liga club Motor Lublin. In July 2019, he joined IV liga side Lewart Lubartów.

== Honours ==
Wisła Puławy

- III liga Lublin–Subcarpathian: 2010–11

Motor Lublin

- Polish Cup (Lublin subdistrict regionals): 2018–19

Lewart Lubartów

- IV liga Lublin: 2019–20
