= Andrzej Sobieszczyk =

Association footballer (born 1993)

Personal information
- Date of birth: 5 May 1993 (age 33)
- Place of birth: Kraków, Poland
- Height: 1.96 m (6 ft 5 in)
- Position: Goalkeeper

Team information
- Current team: Avia Świdnik
- Number: 12

Youth career
- Skawa Wadowice

Senior career*
Years	Team	Apps	(Gls)
2011–2012	Skawa Wadowice		(1)
2012–2017	Puszcza Niepołomice	68	(0)
2012	→ Wiślanka Grabie (loan)		
2013	→ Czarni Staniątki (loan)		
2018–2019	Motor Lublin	9	(0)
2019–2020	Hetman Zamość	18	(0)
2020–	Avia Świdnik	68	(0)

International career
2013	Poland U20	1	(0)
- * Club domestic league appearances and goals as of 22:25, 31 May 2026 (UTC)

Andrzej Sobieszczyk (born 5 May 1993) is a Polish professional footballer who plays as a goalkeeper for II liga club Avia Świdnik. He formerly played for Puszcza Niepołomice, Motor Lublin, and Hetman Zamość.

== Club career ==
Sobieszczyk began his career at Skawa Wadowice. He played at youth level at Skawa, before making his senior debut for the club in 2011. On 14 April 2012, he scored a goal in the 43rd minute against Iskra Brzezinka at a distance of 70 meters.

In 2012, Sobieszczyk signed a contract with II liga club Puszcza Niepołomice, but he spent the 2012–13 season on loan at Wiślanka Grabie and Czarni Staniątki. During his loan spell, Puszcza gained promotion to the I liga. He made his professional debut on 2 August 2013, in Puszcza's first home match of the season, a 2–1 defeat to Chojniczanka Chojnice. On 21 September 2016, Puszcza reached quarter-final of the Polish Cup for the first time in club's history, beating Ekstraklasa side Lechia Gdańsk 4–2 in a penalty shootout. Sobieszczyk saved two penalty shots in the shootout, from Miloš Krasić, and Lukáš Haraslín.

On 9 February 2018, Sobieszyk signed a contract with Motor Lublin. On 18 June 2019, he joined newly promoted III liga side Hetman Zamość.

== International career ==
Sobieszczyk made his first and only appearance for the Poland national under-20 football team on 19 November 2013 in a friendly home match to Germany at Stadion Górnika Łęczna, in front of 7,500 fans.

== Honours ==
Avia Świdnik

- Polish Cup (Lublin regionals): 2024–25
