= Dawid Smug =

Polish footballer

Personal information
- Date of birth: 14 January 1994 (age 32)
- Place of birth: Konin, Poland
- Height: 1.94 m (6 ft 4 in)
- Position: Goalkeeper

Youth career
- –2010: MSP Szamotuły
- 2012: GKS Bełchatów
- 2012–2014: Inter

Senior career*
Years	Team	Apps	(Gls)
2011	Pogoń Lwówek		
2011	Górnik Konin	12	(0)
2015–2016	Miedź Legnica	26	(0)
2015–2016	Miedź Legnica II	2	(0)
2016–2017	Górnik Łęczna	0	(0)
2018	Atlantas	15	(0)
2019–2020	Ruch Chorzów	14	(0)
2020–2021	Hutnik Kraków	21	(0)
2021–2022	Stomil Olsztyn	2	(0)
2022–2023	Pogoń Siedlce	5	(0)
2023–2024	Warta Gorzów Wielkopolski	34	(0)
2025	Polonia Lidzbark Warmiński	10	(0)
2025–2026	Dąb Dębno	17	(0)
- * Club domestic league appearances and goals as of 19:58, 5 July 2026 (UTC)

Dawid Smug (born 14 January 1994) is a Polish professional footballer who plays as a goalkeeper.

== Career ==
In 2011, Smug signed for Polish fourth division side Górnik Konin after training with Lech Poznań in the Polish top flight.

In 2012, he joined the youth academy of Inter, one of Italy's most successful clubs, but left due to a broken metatarsal despite being offered the chance to be sent on loan to the Italian third division.

Before the second half of 2014–15 season, Smug signed for Miedź Legnica in the Polish second division, where he made 26 league appearances.

In 2016, he signed for Polish top flight team Górnik Łęczna.

Before the 2018 season, Smug signed for Atlantas in Lithuania.

In 2020, he signed for Polish third division outfit Hutnik Kraków, where he saved five out of nine penalties.
