= Konrad Nowak =

Konrad Nowak may refer to:

- Konrad Nowak (footballer, born 1985), Polish football player
- Konrad Nowak (footballer, born 1994), Polish football player
