= Kacper Wełniak =

Polish footballer

Personal information
- Date of birth: 21 May 2000 (age 26)
- Place of birth: Nakło nad Notecią, Poland
- Height: 1.85 m (6 ft 1 in)
- Position: Forward

Team information
- Current team: Avia Świdnik
- Number: 90

Youth career
- Skra Paterek
- 2009–2014: Czarni Nakło nad Notecią
- 2014–2017: Legia Warsaw

Senior career*
Years	Team	Apps	(Gls)
2017–2019	Legia Warsaw II	33	(8)
2019	→ Siarka Tarnobrzeg (loan)	11	(2)
2020–2021	Wigry Suwałki	38	(6)
2021–2022	Podbeskidzie Bielsko-Biała	22	(0)
2022–2023	→ Motor Lublin (loan)	16	(8)
2023–2025	Motor Lublin	35	(2)
2025–2026	GKS Tychy	24	(3)
2026–	Avia Świdnik	0	(0)

International career
2015–2016	Poland U15		
2016–2017	Poland U17		
2017	Poland U18	2	(1)
2018	Poland U19	4	(0)
- * Club domestic league appearances and goals as of 15:43, 26 May 2026 (UTC)

Kacper Wełniak (born 21 May 2000) is a Polish professional footballer who plays as a forward for II liga club Avia Świdnik.

== Career ==
=== Youth career ===
Wełniak started playing football in Skra Paterek. In 2009, he moved to Czarni Nakło nad Notecią. On 1 March 2013, during testing for Legia's academy, he sustained a fibula and tibia fracture and underwent surgery, with his rehabilitation lasting until November. During the 2014–15 season, he signed a contract with Legia Warsaw's academy, where he stayed until the rest of his youth career. Before his transfer, Arka Gdynia, Lech Poznań, Lechia Gdańsk and Zawisza Bydgoszcz youth teams were interested in contracting him.

=== Legia Warsaw II ===
He made his debut in Legia's second team on 14 June 2017, coming off the substitutes' bench in the 68th minute of a 1–2 home loss to MKS Ełk. On 27 September, he scored two goals during a 3–1 UEFA Youth League victory over Breiðablik's youth team. He scored his first goal for Legia II on 23 May 2018, in the 75th minute of a 2–2 draw with Tur Bielsk Podlaski. In December 2019, he underwent a trial with Stal Stalowa Wola, which did not result in contracting him.

==== Loan to Siarka Tarnobrzeg ====
On 15 January 2019, his one-year loan to Siarka Tarnobrzeg was announced by the club. Wełniak made his debut in II liga on 16 March 2019 during a 2–2 draw against Znicz Pruszków, during which he came in as a substitute in the 79th minute. On 19 May, he scored the first double of his senior career in a 2–1 home victory over Skra Częstochowa. These two goals were also his first for Siarka.

==== Return from the loan ====
On 10 October 2019, in the 57th minute of a 5–0 away loss over Znicz Biała Piska, Wełniak saw a straight red card. In total, during the 2019–20 season, he scored five goals for Legia II, from which two were scored in a match against Ursus Warsaw.

=== Wigry Suwałki ===
On 10 January 2020, Wełniak was transferred to I liga side Wigry Suwałki on a two-and-a-half-year deal. He made his debut on 1 March during a 4–0 away loss over Podbeskidzie Bielsko-Biała. Five matches before the end of that season, he was relegated to II liga with his team. He spent the next season in Wigry. On 27 July 2020, his contract was prolonged for further two years, until June 2024.

In fall 2020, he sustained an injury to the inferior tibiofibular joint and the ligaments of an ankle. Wełniak scored his first two goals on 25 September 2020, during a 2–0 victory with Śląsk Wrocław II, when he came off the bench in the 12th minute of a match as a consequence of an injury sustained by Cezary Sauczek. Over the course of the two seasons, Wełniak played in 39 matches and scored six goals.

=== Podbeskidzie Bielsko-Biała ===
On 24 July 2021, he moved from Wigry to Podbeskidzie Bielsko-Biała on a three-year deal. There was a clause made in that contract, allowing it to be prolonged. He played his first minute in his new team on 17 August, in a goalless draw against GKS Tychy. In total, he played in twenty-four matches in Podbeskidzie and did not score a goal.

==== Loan to Motor Lublin ====
On 17 January 2023, he was loaned to the I liga side Motor Lublin, with an option to make the move permanent. where he made his debut in a 3–1 victory over Górnik Polkowice on 5 March. In the 16th minute of that match, he scored the first goal for his new team. During his loan spell, Wełniak scored eight goals in 17 matches across all competitions. After the season, Motor advanced to I liga after winning the promotion play-offs.

=== Motor Lublin ===
His transfer to Motor on a three-year deal was announced on 30 July 2023, following the exercise of the transfer clause in his loan deal. On 29 October that year, in the 90th minute of a 2–0 victory over Odra Opole, he scored his first goal in the second division. It was also his first goal since the match with Radunia Stężyca, which took place on 13 May. On 21 April 2021, in the third minute of a 2–0 away loss over Miedź Legnica, Wełniak scored an own goal. After the season, Motor made its advance to Ekstraklasa, where he made his debut in a 1–1 home draw against Korona Kielce on 4 August 2024. On 19 October 2024, in the 86th minute of a 3–4 home loss over Widzew Łódź, he scored his premiere goal in Polish top league.

=== GKS Tychy ===
On 13 June 2025, Wełniak moved down a division to join I liga club GKS Tychy on a two-year deal, with a one-year extension option.

=== Avia Świdnik ===
On 30 June 2026, Wełniak signed with II liga newcomers Avia Świdnik.

== International career ==
Wełniak played for the Poland under-16 national team, making his debut against Serbia on 27 October 2015.

He was part of the under-17s, where he took part in matches against Armenia, Spain, Norway and Romania. On 3 November 2017, he scored two goals in a 2–0 victory over Iceland. Wełniak also played for the under-18 and under-19 teams.

== Personal life ==
He enjoys reading and learning foreign languages.
