= Kamil Rozmus =

Polish footballer

Personal information
- Date of birth: 13 January 1994 (age 32)
- Place of birth: Szczebrzeszyn, Poland
- Height: 1.79 m (5 ft 10 in)
- Position: Left-back

Team information
- Current team: Avia Świdnik
- Number: 4

Youth career
- 2003–2010: Hetman Zamość
- 2010–2013: Legia Warsaw

Senior career*
Years	Team	Apps	(Gls)
2013–2014	Legia Warsaw II	23	(0)
2014–2015	Wisła Płock	1	(0)
2015–2016	Wigry Suwałki	1	(0)
2017–2020	ŁKS Łódź	64	(0)
2020–2021	Górnik Łęczna	4	(0)
2021–2023	Motor Lublin	33	(0)
2023–	Avia Świdnik	82	(4)

International career
2010	Poland U16	1	(0)
- * Club domestic league appearances and goals as of 22:28, 31 May 2026 (UTC)

Kamil Rozmus (born 13 January 1994) is a Polish professional footballer who plays as a left-back for II liga club Avia Świdnik.

== Honours ==
Avia Świdnik

- III liga, group IV: 2025–26
- Polish Cup (Lublin regionals): 2023–24, 2024–25
- Polish Cup (Lublin subdistrict regionals): 2023–24, 2024–25, 2025–26
