= Vasili Sumnakaev =

Russian footballer (born 1995)

Personal information
- Full name: Vasili Vasilyevich Sumnakaev
- Date of birth: 17 November 1995 (age 30)
- Position: Midfielder

Youth career
- 2012–2013: SDYuSShOR-5 Krasnoselskoye
- 2014: Chernomorets Novorossiysk

Senior career*
Years	Team	Apps	(Gls)
2016	Dinamo Brest	1	(0)
2017	Znicz Biała Piska	2	(0)
Total		3	(0)
- * Club domestic league appearances and goals

Vasili Vasilyevich Sumnakaev (Russian: Василий Васильевич Сумнакаев; born 17 November 1995) is a Russian former professional footballer who played as a midfielder.
