= 2025–26 III liga =

III liga
- Season: 2025–26
- Dates: 1 August 2025 – 9 June 2026
- Champions: Legia Warsaw II (group I); Zawisza Bydgoszcz (group II); Lechia Zielona Góra (group III); Avia Świdnik (group IV)
- Promoted: Legia Warsaw II; Zawisza Bydgoszcz; Lechia Zielona Góra; Avia Świdnik
- Matches: 1,205
- Goals: 3,827 (3.18 per match)
- Top goalscorer: Hubert Antkowiak (31 goals)

The 2025–26 III liga (also known as Betclic III liga for sponsorship reasons) was the 18th season of the fourth tier domestic division in the Polish football league system since its establishment in 2008 under its current title (III liga) and the ninth season under its current league division format. The league is operated by the Polish Football Association (PZPN).

The competition was contested by 72 clubs split geographically across 4 groups of 18 teams, with the winners of each group gaining promotion to the II liga. The season was played in a round-robin tournament, culminating in promotion/relegation play-offs involving two second-placed III liga teams facing II liga clubs that finished their season in 13th and 14th.

== Changes from last season ==
The following teams have changed division since the 2024–25 season.

=== To III liga ===
Relegated from 2024–25 II liga	▼ Zagłębie Lubin II (RPO) ▼ Skra Częstochowa (17th) ▼ Olimpia Elbląg (18th)	Promoted from 2024–25 IV liga	Group I ▲ Widzew Łódź II ▲KS CK Troszyn ▲KS Wasilków ▲ Znicz Biała Piska ▲ Ząbkovia Ząbki	Group II ▲ Lipno Stęszew ▲ Tłuchowia Tłuchowo ▲ Wikęd Luzino ▲ Kluczevia Stargard ▲ Victoria Września	Group III ▲ Słowianin Wolibórz ▲ Stal Jasień ▲LZS Starowice Dolne ▲ Sparta Katowice ▲ Polonia Nysa	Group IV ▲ Cracovia II ▲ Stal Kraśnik ▲ Sokół Kolbuszowa Dolna ▲ Sparta Kazimierza Wielka ▲ Naprzód Jędrzejów

=== From III liga ===
Promoted to 2025–26 II liga	▲ Unia Skierniewice (Group I) ▲ Sokół Kleczew (Group II) ▲ Śląsk Wrocław II (Group III) ▲ Sandecja Nowy Sącz (Group IV) ▲ Podhale Nowy Targ (RPO)	Relegated to 2025–26 IV liga	Group I ▼ Stomil Olsztyn ▼ Victoria Sulejówek ▼ Polonia Lidzbark Warmiński ▼ Pelikan Łowicz ▼ Sokół Aleksandrów Łódzki	Group II ▼ Kotwica Kórnik ▼ Gedania Gdańsk ▼ Gryf Słupsk	Group III ▼ Stilon Gorzów Wielkopolski ▼ Podlesianka Katowice ▼ Odra Bytom Odrzański ▼ Unia Turza Śląska ▼ Stal Brzeg ▼ Polonia Słubice	Group IV ▼KS Wiązownica ▼ Lewart Lubartów ▼ Unia Tarnów	Relegated to the 2025–26 regional league	Group II ▼ Vineta Wolin

== Teams ==
The following teams competed in the III liga for the 2025–26 season.

Group I	Group II	Group III	Group IV
Broń Radom; GKS Bełchatów; GKS Wikielec; Jagiellonia Białystok II; KS CK Troszyn; KS Wasilków; Lechia Tomaszów Mazowiecki; Legia Warsaw II; ŁKS Łomża; Mławianka Mława; Olimpia Elbląg; Świt Nowy Dwór Mazowiecki; Warta Sieradz; Widzew Łódź II; Wigry Suwałki; Wisła Płock II; Ząbkovia Ząbki; Znicz Biała Piska	Błękitni Stargard; Cartusia Kartuzy; Elana Toruń; Flota Świnoujście; Kluczevia Stargard; Lech Poznań II; Lipno Stęszew; Noteć Czarnków; Pogoń Nowe Skalmierzyce; Pogoń Szczecin II; Polonia Środa Wielkopolska; Tłuchovia Tłuchowo; Unia Swarzędz; Victoria Września; Wda Świecie; Wikęd Luzino; Wybrzeże Rewalskie Rewal; Zawisza Bydgoszcz	Carina Gubin; Górnik Zabrze II; Górnik Polkowice; Karkonosze Jelenia Góra; KS Goczałkowice-Zdrój; Lechia Zielona Góra; LZS Starowice Dolne; Miedź Legnica II; MKS Kluczbork; Pniówek Pawłowice Śląskie; Polonia Nysa; Skra Częstochowa; Słowianin Wolibórz; Sparta Katowice; Stal Jasień; Ślęza Wrocław; Warta Gorzów Wielkopolski; Zagłębie Lubin II	Avia Świdnik; Chełmianka Chełm; Cracovia II; Czarni Połaniec; Korona Kielce II; KSZO Ostrowiec Świętokrzyski; Naprzód Jędrzejów; Podlasie Biała Podlaska; Pogoń-Sokół Lubaczów; Siarka Tarnobrzeg; Sokół Kolbuszowa Dolna; Sparta Kazimierza Wielka; Stal Kraśnik; Star Starachowice; Świdniczanka Świdnik; Wisła Kraków II; Wisłoka Dębica; Wiślanie Skawina

== League tables ==
=== Group I ===
III liga Group I
- Season: 2025–26
- Dates: 1 August 2025 – 30 May 2026
- Champions: Legia Warsaw II
- Promoted: Legia Warsaw II
- Relegated: GKS Wikielec; Broń Radom; GKS Bełchatów; KS Wasilków; Znicz Biała Piska
- Matches: 305
- Goals: 1,015 (3.33 per match)
- Top goalscorer: Hubert Antkowiak (31 goals)
- Biggest home win: Legia II 7–0 Broń (2 November 2025); Wigry 7–0 Znicz (14 march 2026)
- Biggest away win: Znicz 0–7 CK Troszyn (11 October 2025)
- Highest scoring: ŁKS 6–4 Widzew II (9 August 2025)

Pos	Team	Pld	W	D	L	GF	GA	GD	Pts	Promotion
1	Legia Warsaw II (C, P)	34	27	3	4	82	29	+53	84	Promotion to II liga
2	ŁKS Łomża (Q)	34	22	5	7	77	31	+46	71 (Note: Head-to-head points: ŁKS Łomża 4, Warta Sieradz 1.)	Qualification to the promotion play-offs
3	Warta Sieradz	34	21	8	5	64	34	+30	71	
4	Wigry Suwałki	34	20	5	9	64	43	+21	65	
5	KS CK Troszyn	34	17	6	11	75	47	+28	57	
6	Wisła Płock II	34	16	8	10	56	51	+5	56	
7	Widzew Łódź II	34	17	3	14	70	64	+6	54	
8	Jagiellonia Białystok II	34	14	7	13	46	45	+1	49	
9	Lechia Tomaszów Mazowiecki	34	13	8	13	64	55	+9	47	
10	Ząbkovia Ząbki	34	13	5	16	72	64	+8	44	
11	Świt Nowy Dwór Mazowiecki	34	12	5	17	51	66	−15	41	
12	Mławianka Mława	34	11	7	16	55	59	−4	40	
13	Olimpia Elbląg	34	10	8	16	45	61	−16	38	
14	GKS Wikielec (R)	34	10	7	17	40	54	−14	37	Relegation to IV liga
15	Broń Radom (R)	34	9	9	16	40	57	−17	36	Relegation to IV liga
16	GKS Bełchatów (R)	34	9	7	18	50	76	−26	34	Relegation to IV liga
17	KS Wasilków (R)	34	7	4	23	40	79	−39	25	Relegation to IV liga
18	Znicz Biała Piska (R)	34	4	3	27	27	103	−76	15	Relegation to IV liga

Source: 90minut.pl Soccerway
Rules for classification: 1. Number of points reached in the entire series of games; 2. Number of points reached in direct matches; 3. Goal difference in direct matches; 4. Goal difference in direct matches – away goals counted twice; 5. Goal difference in the whole series of games; 6. Number of goals scored in the entire series of games.
(C) Champions; (P) Promoted; (Q) Qualified for the phase indicated; (R) Relegated

=== Group II ===
III liga Group II
- Season: 2025–26
- Dates: 1 August 2025 – 30 May 2026
- Champions: Zawisza Bydgoszcz
- Promoted: Zawisza Bydgoszcz
- Relegated: Pogoń Szczecin II; Pogoń Nowe Skalmierzyce; Cartusia Kartuzy; Tłuchowia Tłuchowo; Wybrzeże Rewalskie Rewal
- Matches: 306
- Goals: 926 (3.03 per match)
- Top goalscorer: Michał Kalitta; Hubert Turski (16 goals each)
- Biggest home win: Pogoń II 13–1 Wda (24 May 2026)
- Biggest away win: Rewal 2–7 Zawisza (12 April 2026)
- Highest scoring: Pogoń II 13–1 Wda (24 May 2026)

Pos	Team	Pld	W	D	L	GF	GA	GD	Pts	Promotion
1	Zawisza Bydgoszcz (C, P)	34	25	5	4	73	23	+50	80	Promotion to II liga
2	Wikęd Luzino (Q)	34	24	4	6	79	39	+40	76	Qualification to the promotion play-offs
3	Polonia Środa Wielkopolska	34	20	6	8	67	43	+24	66	
4	Lipno Stęszew	34	15	6	13	47	54	−7	51	
5	Noteć Czarnków	34	14	7	13	49	46	+3	49 (Note: Head-to-head points: Noteć Czarnków 13, Elana Toruń 10, Lech Poznań II 9, Flota Świnoujście 2.)	
6	Elana Toruń	34	14	7	13	49	55	−6	49	
7	Lech Poznań II	34	14	7	13	67	54	+13	49	
8	Flota Świnoujście	34	14	7	13	48	52	−4	49	
9	Wda Świecie	34	14	6	14	44	66	−22	48	
10	Unia Swarzędz	34	13	8	13	47	41	+6	47	
11	Kluczevia Stargard	34	13	7	14	54	43	+11	46	
12	Błękitni Stargard	34	12	9	13	56	51	+5	45	
13	Victoria Września	34	13	3	18	41	46	−5	42	
14	Pogoń Szczecin II (R)	34	12	5	17	75	66	+9	41	Relegation to IV liga
15	Pogoń Nowe Skalmierzyce (R)	34	10	9	15	35	46	−11	39	Relegation to IV liga
16	Cartusia Kartuzy (R)	34	11	5	18	38	51	−13	38	Relegation to IV liga
17	Tłuchovia Tłuchowo (R)	34	8	7	19	37	66	−29	31	Relegation to IV liga
18	Wybrzeże Rewalskie Rewal (R)	34	3	6	25	20	84	−64	15	Relegation to IV liga

Source: 90minut.pl Soccerway
Rules for classification: 1. Number of points reached in the entire series of games; 2. Number of points reached in direct matches; 3. Goal difference in direct matches; 4. Goal difference in direct matches – away goals counted twice; 5. Goal difference in the whole series of games; 6. Number of goals scored in the entire series of games.
(C) Champions; (P) Promoted; (Q) Qualified for the phase indicated; (R) Relegated

=== Group III ===
III liga Group III
- Season: 2025–26
- Dates: 2 August 2025 – 30 May 2026
- Champions: Lechia Zielona Góra
- Promoted: Lechia Zielona Góra
- Relegated: Skra Częstochowa; Górnik Zabrze II; Słowianin Wolibórz; LZS Starowice Dolne; Pniówek Pawłowice; Stal Jasień
- Matches: 289
- Goals: 931 (3.22 per match)
- Top goalscorer: Dawid Kasprzyk (22 goals)
- Biggest home win: Górnik II 7–0 Starowice (6 March 2026)
- Biggest away win: Starowice 0–7 Lechia (31 October 2025); Pniówek 0–7 Górnik P. (13 May 2026)
- Highest scoring: Miedź II 5–5 Zagłębie II (7 November 2025)

Pos	Team	Pld	W	D	L	GF	GA	GD	Pts	Promotion
1	Lechia Zielona Góra (C, P)	34	21	10	3	77	17	+60	73	Promotion to II liga
2	Górnik Polkowice (Q)	34	20	7	7	64	42	+22	67	Qualification to the promotion play-offs
3	Sparta Katowice	34	18	8	8	53	34	+19	62	
4	Skra Częstochowa (Note: Skra Częstochowa withdrew from competition at the end of the season.) (R)	34	17	8	9	68	56	+12	59	Withdrawn from the league
5	Zagłębie Lubin II	34	17	6	11	77	61	+16	57	
6	KS Goczałkowice-Zdrój	34	15	9	10	49	46	+3	54	
7	MKS Kluczbork	34	15	7	12	67	43	+24	52 (Note: Tied on head-to-head points and goal difference. Overall goal difference: MKS Kluczbork +24, Warta Gorzów Wielkopolski +7.)	
8	Warta Gorzów Wielkopolski	34	15	7	12	54	47	+7	52	
9	Górnik Zabrze II (Note: Górnik Zabrze disbanded their reserve team at the end of the season.) (R)	34	15	6	13	73	44	+29	51	Withdrawn from the league
10	Ślęza Wrocław	34	14	7	13	49	57	−8	49	
11	Słowianin Wolibórz (Note: Słowianin Wolibórz withdrew from competition at the end of the season.) (R)	34	13	9	12	48	49	−1	48	Withdrawn from the league
12	Carina Gubin	34	12	11	11	50	51	−1	47	
13	Miedź Legnica II	34	13	7	14	63	58	+5	46	
14	Karkonosze Jelenia Góra	34	12	9	13	57	56	+1	45	
15	Polonia Nysa	34	9	10	15	51	58	−7	37	
16	LZS Starowice Dolne (R)	34	7	6	21	33	81	−48	27	Relegation to IV liga
17	Pniówek Pawłowice (R)	34	5	4	25	28	77	−49	19	Relegation to IV liga
18	Stal Jasień (Note: Stal Jasień has withdrawn from the competition after 19th round.) (R)	34	2	1	31	21	105	−84	7	Withdrawn from the league

Source: 90minut.pl Soccerway
Rules for classification: 1. Number of points reached in the entire series of games; 2. Number of points reached in direct matches; 3. Goal difference in direct matches; 4. Goal difference in direct matches – away goals counted twice; 5. Goal difference in the whole series of games; 6. Number of goals scored in the entire series of games.
(C) Champions; (P) Promoted; (Q) Qualified for the phase indicated; (R) Relegated

=== Group IV ===
III liga Group IV
- Season: 2025–26
- Dates: 1 August 2025 – 30 May 2026
- Champions: Avia Świdnik
- Promoted: Avia Świdnik
- Relegated: Stal Kraśnik; Cracovia II; Świdniczanka Świdnik; Sparta Kazimierza Wielka
- Matches: 305
- Goals: 955 (3.13 per match)
- Top goalscorer: Paweł Mróz (21 goals)
- Biggest home win: Wisła II 8–0 Sparta (22 November 2025)
- Biggest away win: Sparta 0–6 Wiślanie (28 November 2025); Sparta 0–6 Avia (8 March 2026)
- Highest scoring: Siarka 5–6 Cracovia II (30 May 2026)

Pos	Team	Pld	W	D	L	GF	GA	GD	Pts	Promotion
1	Avia Świdnik (C, P)	34	23	8	3	84	35	+49	77	Promotion to II liga
2	KSZO Ostrowiec Świętokrzyski (Q)	34	22	8	4	66	30	+36	74	Qualification to the promotion play-offs
3	Chełmianka Chełm	34	21	9	4	65	31	+34	72	
4	Korona Kielce II	34	18	4	12	66	59	+7	58	
5	Star Starachowice	34	15	10	9	51	43	+8	55	
6	Czarni Połaniec	34	16	5	13	59	49	+10	53	
7	Podlasie Biała Podlaska	34	14	10	10	60	48	+12	52	
8	Pogoń-Sokół Lubaczów	34	14	9	11	61	45	+16	51 (Note: Head-to-head points: Pogoń-Sokół Lubaczów 6, Wiślanie Skawina 0.)	
9	Wiślanie Skawina	34	15	6	13	52	51	+1	51	
10	Wisła Kraków II	34	15	4	15	67	58	+9	49	
11	Wisłoka Dębica	34	12	12	10	37	35	+2	48	
12	Siarka Tarnobrzeg	34	11	10	13	59	52	+7	43	
13	Naprzód Jędrzejów	34	11	5	18	45	55	−10	38	
14	Sokół Kolbuszowa Dolna	34	11	4	19	36	54	−18	37	
15	Stal Kraśnik (R)	34	9	7	18	42	52	−10	34	Relegation to IV liga
16	Cracovia II (R)	34	9	6	19	44	71	−27	33	Relegation to IV liga
17	Świdniczanka Świdnik (R)	34	5	4	25	35	80	−45	19	Relegation to IV liga
18	Sparta Kazimierza Wielka (R)	34	4	1	29	29	110	−81	13	Relegation to IV liga

Source: 90minut.pl Soccerway
Rules for classification: 1. Number of points reached in the entire series of games; 2. Number of points reached in direct matches; 3. Goal difference in direct matches; 4. Goal difference in direct matches – away goals counted twice; 5. Goal difference in the whole series of games; 6. Number of goals scored in the entire series of games.
(C) Champions; (P) Promoted; (Q) Qualified for the phase indicated; (R) Relegated

== See also ==
- 2025–26 Ekstraklasa
- 2025–26 I liga
- 2025–26 II liga
- 2025–26 Polish Cup
- 2025 Polish Super Cup
