= Znicz Biała Piska =

Polish football club

- Full name: Miejski Ludowy Klub Sportowy; Znicz Biała Piska
- Short name: Znicz BP
- Founded: 18 July 1954; 72 years ago
- Stadium: Municipal Stadium
- Capacity: 500
- Owner: Jacek Jankowski
- Chairman: Jacek Jankowski
- Manager: Kamil Lauryn
- League: IV liga Warmia-Masuria
- 2025–26: III liga, group I, 18th of 18 (relegated)
- Website: zniczbialapiska.pl

Znicz Biała Piska is a Polish semi-professional football club from Biała Piska, Pisz County, Warmian-Masurian Voivodeship. They compete in the IV liga Warmia-Masuria, the fifth tier of the Polish league system, following relegation from the III liga in the 2025–26 season.

== History ==
The club was founded on 18 July 1954 as Ludowy Klub Sportowy Znicz Biała Piska, a local LZS club in the local leagues.

In 1974, they ceased activity for four years, before resuming activity in 1978 as Międzyzakładowy Klub Sportowy Znicz Biała Piska, becoming an unaffiliated works team. Despite some minor league successes, by 1996 the club dissolved its senior team, although continued to exist as a sports club focusing on youth development.

Two mergers followed: with Orkan Drygały in 1999 creating Znicz/Orkan Biała Piska restoring the senior team; and with Płomień Ełk in 2000 creating Płomień/Znicz Biała Piska.

Between 2000 and 2004, they played in the fourth division. After relegation in 2004 the club suffered financial and organisational problems, and changed its name to Miejski Ludowy Klub Sportowy Znicz Biała Piska.

Their fortunes changed however, winning their division in 2011 and a further promotion in 2013 reaching their highest league hierarchy in their history.

In 2018, they won their fifth division with a 30-point lead. Subsequently, in the next two seasons, 2018–19 and 2019–20, the reached the finals of the Warmian-Mazurian Polish Cup, but lost both finals.

== Scouting network ==
Due to the club's remote location and the town's small population, the club has a wide catchment area in order to remain competitive, attract a good calibre of players and keep its youth teams in full squad. Players are recruited regularly from Białystok, Podlaskie Voivodeship, Ełk and Pisz.

== Rivalries ==
Znicz has local derbies against GKS Wikielec and Mamry Giżycko.

== Honours ==
- IV liga Warmia-Masuria
  - Champions: 2017–18, 2024–25
  - Runners-up: 2012–13
- Regional league
  - Champions: 2010–11
- Klasa A
  - Champions: 1984–85, 2007–08
- Polish Cup (Warmia-Masuria regionals)
  - Runners-up: 2018–19, 2019–20
  - Semi-finals: 2012–13, 2021–22, 2023–24, 2024–25
  - Quarter-finals: 2001–02, 2014–15, 2016–17, 2017–18, 2020–21, 2022–23

== Notable players ==
Notable professional players who played for the club include Oskar Fürst, Vasili Sumnakaev, Artsyom Huzik, Jacek Falkowski, and Vasily Zhurnevich.

== Bibliography ==
- Marek Łukiewski, ed. (2015), "Znicz Biała Piska", 70 lat Warmińsko-Mazurskiego Związku Piłki Nożnej (in Polish), Olsztyn: Wers, p. 256, ISBN 978-83-60488-57-7
