= Artsyom Huzik =

Belarusian footballer

Personal information
- Date of birth: 8 April 1992 (age 34)
- Place of birth: Grodno, Belarus
- Position: Defender

Team information
- Current team: Dyatlovo

Youth career
- 2009–2011: Neman Grodno

Senior career*
Years	Team	Apps	(Gls)
2010–2012	Neman Grodno	4	(0)
2012	Smorgon	2	(0)
2013	Slonim	14	(1)
2015	Smorgon	4	(0)
2018	Tsementnik Krasnoselsky		
2019–2020	Znicz Biała Piska	12	(1)
2021	Tsementnik Krasnoselsky	18	(16)
2022–	Dyatlovo	31	(43)
- * Club domestic league appearances and goals as of 31 December 2023

Artsyom Igaravich Huzik (Belarusian: Арцём Ігаравіч Гузік; born 8 April 1992) is a Belarusian professional footballer currently playing for Dyatlovo.
