= Vasily Zhurnevich =

Belarusian footballer

Personal information
- Date of birth: 21 February 1995 (age 31)
- Place of birth: Lutskovlyany, Grodno Oblast, Belarus
- Height: 1.82 m (5 ft 11 1/2 in)
- Position: Forward

Youth career
- 2011–2012: PMC Postavy
- 2012–2014: Neman Grodno

Senior career*
Years	Team	Apps	(Gls)
2014–2018	Neman Grodno	18	(1)
2017	→ Znicz Biała Piska (loan)	15	(4)
2019	Lida	14	(3)
2019	Slonim-2017	13	(5)
2020	Torpedo-BelAZ Zhodino	5	(0)
2021	Dinamo Brest	6	(1)
2022	Neman Grodno	0	(0)
2022	→ Slonim-2017 (loan)	15	(5)

International career
2010	Belarus U16	1	(0)
2015	Belarus U21	1	(0)
- * Club domestic league appearances and goals as of 18 July 2024

Vasily Zhurnevich (Belarusian: Васіль Журневіч; Russian: Василий Журневич; born 21 February 1995) is a Belarusian professional footballer who plays as a forward.
