= Naprzód Jędrzejów =

Polish football club

- Full name: Klub Sportowy Naprzód w Jędrzejowie
- Founded: 3 August 1928; 97 years ago
- Ground: Paweł Świerkowski Stadium
- Capacity: 3,000
- Chairman: Tomasz Borowiecki
- Manager: Łukasz Cabaj
- League: III liga, group IV
- 2025–26: III liga, group IV, 13th of 18
- Website: http://www.naprzodjedrzejow.pl/

Naprzód Jędrzejów is a Polish football club based in Jędrzejów. They currently compete in group IV of the III liga, the fourth tier of the Polish league system.
