= Pogoń Szczecin II =

Polish football club

- Full name: Morski Klub Sportowy; Pogoń Szczecin II
- Chairman: Alex Haditaghi
- Manager: Marek Safanów
- League: IV liga West Pomerania
- 2025–26: III liga, group II, 14th of 18 (relegated)
- Website: akademia.pogonszczecin.pl/aktualnosci/
| Home colours | Away colours |

Pogoń Szczecin II is a Polish football team, which serves as the reserve side of Pogoń Szczecin. They compete in the IV liga West Pomerania, the fifth division of Polish football, after relegation from the 2025–26 III liga.

In recent years, they participated in the Polish Cup in the 2001–02, 2022–23 and 2023–24 seasons.

== Honours ==
- III liga
  - Runners-up: 2003–04 (West Pomerania), 2022–23 (group II)
- IV liga West Pomerania
  - Runners-up: 2011–12
- V liga Szczecin
  - Champions: 2010–11
- Regional league Szczecin
  - Runners-up: 2007–08 (group III), 2009–10 (group I)
- Polish Cup (West Pomerania regionals)
  - Winners: 2000–01 2021–22, 2022–23
- Polish Cup (Szczecin regionals)
  - Winners: 1994–95

== Notable former players ==
Players who have been capped in their national teams

- (Poland) Kacper Kozłowski
- (Poland) Mateusz Łęgowski
