= Warta Sieradz =

Polish football club

- Full name: Klub Sportowy Warta Sieradz
- Founded: 1945; 81 years ago
- Ground: MOSiR Stadium
- Capacity: 1,384
- Chairman: Ryszard Mes
- Manager: Piotr Łęczyński
- League: III liga, group I
- 2025–26: III liga, group I, 3rd of 18
- Website: wartasieradz.com

KS Warta Sieradz is a Polish sports club from Sieradz, Łódź Voivodeship. The club was founded in 1945. The club colours are green and white.

The men's association football team plays in the III liga, the fourth tier of Polish football. The team reached the third round of the 1962–63 Polish Cup, the second round of the 1964–65 and 1977–78 Polish Cups, the round of 16 in the 1978–79 Polish Cup, the third round in 1984–85 and the second round in 1985–86. The team famously eliminated Śląsk Wrocław in their 1978–79 cup run. They lost the quarter-finals 1–2 to Arka Gdynia, breaking the stadium attendance record as 9,000 people watched the match.

After 2000, the team played as far down as the Liga okręgowa (sixth tier) from 2002 to 2004, but stayed in the III liga from 2008–09 to 2017–18, and again from 2021–22.
