= IV liga Warmia-Masuria =

- Organising body: Warmian-Masurian; Football Association
- Founded: 2000; 26 years ago
- Country: Poland
- Number of clubs: 16
- Level on pyramid: 5
- Promotion to: III liga, group II
- Relegation to: Liga okręgowa
- Current champions: Polonia Lidzbark Warmiński (3rd title) (2025–26)
- Most championships: GKS Wikielec; Polonia Lidzbark Warmiński (3 titles each)
- Sponsor(s): Superscore

IV liga Warmia-Masuria group (grupa warmińsko-mazurska), also known as Superscore IV liga Warmińsko-Mazurska for sponsorship reasons, is one of the groups of IV liga, the fifth level of Polish football league system. The league was created in the 2000–01 season after a new administrative division of Poland was established. Until the end of the 2007–08 season, IV liga was placed at the fourth tier of league system, but this was changed with the formation of Ekstraklasa as the top-tier league in Poland.

The clubs from Warmian-Masurian Voivodeship compete in this group. The winner of the league is promoted to group I of the III liga. The bottom teams are relegated to the groups of Liga okręgowa from Warmian-Masurian Voivodeship. These groups are Warmia-Masuria I and Warmia-Masuria II.

== Season 2000–01 ==
IV liga is placed at 4th level of Polish football league system until the end of 2007–08 season.

Warmia-Masuria group was created with the following 18 clubs:

- moved from "Białystok-Ciechanów-Łomża-Olsztyn-Ostrołęka-Suwałki-Warszawa I" group: MKS Szczytno, Mrągowia Mrągowo and Tęcza Biskupiec.
- moved from "Białystok-Ciechanów-Łomża-Olsztyn-Ostrołęka-Suwałki-Warszawa II" group: Mamry Giżycko, Motor Lubawa, Rolimpex Dobre Miasto and Stomil II Olsztyn.
- moved from "Bydgoszcz-Elbląg-Toruń" group: Błękitni Orneta, Polonia Elbląg and Polonia Pasłęk.
- promoted from Liga okręgowa: Start Działdowo ("Ciechanów" group), Syrena Młynary ("Elbląg" group), Łyna Sępopol, Polonia Lidzbark Warmiński and Sokół Ostróda. ("Olsztyn" group), Mazur Ełk and Płomień Ełk ("Suwałki" group) and Drwęca Nowe Miasto Lubawskie ("Toruń" group).

Final table:

Pos	Club	M	P	W	D	L	GF	GA	GD
1	Polonia Lidzbark Warmiński [P]	34	77	24	5	5	79	28	51
2	Mrągowia Mrągowo	34	72	21	9	4	57	21	36
3	Stomil II Olsztyn	34	69	18	15	1	57	17	40
4	Drwęca Nowe Miasto Lubawskie [P]	34	68	20	8	6	66	30	36
5	Polonia Pasłęk	34	64	19	7	8	58	34	24
6	Polonia Elbląg	34	55	15	10	9	66	44	22
7	Błękitni Orneta	34	54	16	6	12	64	43	21
8	Motor Lubawa	34	46	12	10	12	46	49	-3
9	Płomień/Znicz Biała Piska [P]	34	44	11	11	12	48	51	-3
10	Rolimpex Dobre Miasto	34	43	10	13	11	32	36	-4
11	Tęcza Biskupiec	34	42	12	6	16	59	62	-3
12	Mazur Ełk [P]	34	42	12	6	16	53	67	-14
13	Sokół Ostróda [P]	34	40	11	7	16	46	50	-4
14	Start Działdowo [P]	34	37	10	7	17	34	47	-13
15	Łyna Sępopol [P]	34	34	9	7	18	49	67	-18
16	MKS Szczytno	34	31	8	7	19	50	74	-24
17	Mamry Giżycko	34	15	3	6	25	31	97	-66
18	Syrena Młynary [P]	34	13	3	4	27	36	114	-78

- Płomień Ełk merged with Znicz Biała Piska before the season to form Płomień/Znicz Biała Piska. Znicz became legal successor of this merge.

== Season 2001–02 ==
New clubs:
- relegated from III liga "Łódź-Mazovia-Podlasie-Warmia/Masuria" group: Granica Kętrzyn, Jeziorak Iława and Zatoka Braniewo.
- promoted from Liga okręgowa: Czarni Małdyty and Victoria Bartoszyce ("Warmia-Masuria I" group),Olimpia Olsztynek and Start Nidzica ("Warmia-Masuria II" group), Mazur Pisz and Orlęta Reszel ("Warmia-Masuria III" group).

Final table:

Pos	Club	M	P	W	D	L	GF	GA	GD
1	Polonia Elbląg	32	74	22	8	2	75	23	52
2	Granica Kętrzyn [R]	32	61	18	7	7	61	31	30
3	Czarni Małdyty [P]	32	54	14	12	6	48	33	15
4	Stomil II Olsztyn	32	53	15	8	9	60	40	20
5	Mrągowia Mrągowo	32	50	14	8	10	51	33	18
6	Motor Lubawa	32	49	14	7	11	51	52	-1
7	Drwęca Nowe Miasto Lubawskie	32	47	13	8	11	62	48	14
8	Jeziorak Iława [R]	32	46	13	7	12	47	32	15
9	Błękitni Orneta	32	46	12	10	10	50	43	7
10	Polonia Pasłęk	32	45	11	12	9	44	35	9
11	Orlęta Reszel [P]	32	43	10	13	9	43	40	3
12	Start Nidzica [P]	32	36	10	6	16	38	49	-11
13	Płomień/Znicz Biała Piska	32	36	8	12	12	42	57	-15
14	Olimpia Olsztynek [P]	32	34	9	7	16	39	52	-13
15	Warfama Dobre Miasto	32	32	7	11	14	29	55	-26
16	Victoria Bartoszyce [P]	32	18	4	6	22	24	92	-68
17	Mazur Pisz [P]	32	17	3	8	21	16	65	-49
18	Zatoka Braniewo [R]	0	0	0	0	0	0	0	0

- Rolimpex Dobre Miasto changed name into Warfama Dobre Miasto.
- Zatoka Braniewo withdrew in mid-season. Its results were cancelled.

== Season 2002–03 ==
New clubs:
- relegated from III liga "Łódź-Mazovia-Podlasie-Warmia/Masuria" group: Polonia Lidzbark Warmiński.
- promoted from Liga okręgowa: Mazur Ełk and Tęcza Biskupiec ("Warmia-Masuria I" group) and Sokół Ostróda and Start Działdowo ("Warmia-Masuria II" group).

Final table:

Pos	Club	M	P	W	D	L	GF	GA	GD
1	Drwęca Nowe Miasto Lubawskie	34	76	23	7	4	85	20	65
2	Sokół Ostróda [P]	34	67	19	10	5	47	26	21
3	Jeziorak Iława	34	63	18	9	7	80	35	45
4	Warmia i Mazury Olsztyn	34	55	17	4	13	63	44	19
5	Polonia Pasłęk	34	54	14	12	8	44	29	15
6	Błękitni Orneta	34	52	16	4	14	60	63	-3
7	Czarni Małdyty	34	51	15	6	13	54	47	7
8	Orlęta Reszel	34	49	14	7	13	61	52	9
9	Granica Kętrzyn	34	46	13	7	14	64	58	6
10	Tęcza Biskupiec [P]	34	44	12	8	14	57	60	-3
11	Mrągowia Mrągowo	34	41	11	8	15	45	66	-21
12	Płomień/Znicz Biała Piska	34	41	12	5	17	42	62	-20
13	Polonia Lidzbark Warmiński [R]	34	40	11	7	16	47	69	-22
14	Mazur Ełk [P]	34	40	13	1	20	47	67	-20
15	Motor Lubawa	34	40	10	10	14	37	53	-16
16	Start Działdowo [P]	34	39	10	9	15	44	56	-12
17	Olimpia Olsztynek	34	35	10	5	19	38	71	-33
18	Start Nidzica	34	24	7	3	24	40	77	-37

- Stomil II Olsztyn changed name into Warmia i Mazury Olsztyn.
- Czarni Małdyty withdrew after the season.
- Warmia i Mazury Olsztyn after the season was replaced by the first team of the club (Stomil Olsztyn) relegated from II liga.

== Season 2003–04 ==
- relegated from II liga: Stomil Olsztyn (the club did not get license to play in III liga).
- promoted from Liga okręgowa: MKS Korsze and Warmia Olsztyn ("Warmia-Masuria I" group), Ewingi Zalewo and Huragan Morąg ("Warmia-Masuria II" group).

Final table:

Pos	Club	M	P	W	D	L	GF	GA	GD
1	Warmia i Mazury Olsztyn [R]	34	84	26	6	2	72	18	54
2	Jeziorak Iława	34	73	22	7	5	90	23	67
3	Mazur Ełk	34	71	22	5	7	93	29	64
4	Sokół Ostróda	34	66	19	9	6	63	34	29
5	Huragan Morąg [P]	34	59	18	5	11	65	38	27
6	Mrągowia Mrągowo	34	56	17	5	12	55	42	13
7	Start Działdowo	34	54	14	12	8	57	37	20
8	Polonia Pasłęk	34	50	13	11	10	47	44	3
9	Orlęta Reszel	34	47	12	11	11	59	58	1
10	Motor Lubawa	34	45	12	9	13	54	58	-4
11	Granica Kętrzyn	34	43	12	7	15	63	60	3
12	Ewingi Zalewo [P]	34	37	10	7	17	49	57	-8
13	Tęcza Biskupiec	34	36	10	6	18	39	68	-29
14	MKS Korsze [P]	34	34	9	7	18	40	69	-29
15	Błękitni Orneta	34	30	8	6	20	37	80	-43
16	Warmia Olsztyn [P]	34	26	6	8	20	38	77	-39
17	Polonia Lidzbark Warmiński	34	20	5	5	24	18	86	-68
18	Płomień/Znicz Biała Piska	34	19	3	10	21	26	87	-61

- Warmia i Mazury Olsztyn (reserve team of Stomil Olsztyn) was replaced by the first team of the club but kept the name.

== Season 2004–05 ==
New clubs:
- relegated from III liga "Łódź-Mazovia-Podlasie-Warmia/Masuria" group: Polonia-Olimpia Elbląg.
- promoted from Liga okręgowa: Rominta Gołdap and Victoria Bartoszyce ("Warmia-Masuria I" group), Warmiak Łukta and Zamek Kurzętnik ("Warmia-Masuria II" group).

Final table:

Pos	Club	M	P	W	D	L	GF	GA	GD
1	Jeziorak Iława	34	89	28	5	1	114	22	92
2	Olimpia Elbląg [R]	34	78	24	6	4	72	28	44
3	Mrągowia Mrągowo	34	63	19	6	9	50	28	22
4	Huragan Morąg	34	58	17	7	10	57	39	18
5	Granica Kętrzyn	34	56	16	8	10	69	55	14
6	Polonia Pasłęk	34	51	15	6	13	56	52	4
7	Mazur Ełk	34	47	14	5	15	53	54	-1
8	Orlęta Reszel	34	47	13	8	13	61	70	-9
9	Victoria Bartoszyce [P]	34	44	12	8	14	56	58	-2
10	Motor Lubawa	34	44	12	8	14	44	48	-4
11	Rominta Gołdap [P]	34	44	12	8	14	45	50	-5
12	Start Działdowo	34	43	12	7	15	38	47	-9
13	Sokół Ostróda	34	42	11	9	14	52	40	12
14	Warmiak Łukta [P]	34	41	11	8	15	46	67	-21
15	Zamek Kurzętnik [P]	34	38	10	8	16	43	50	-7
16	MKS Korsze	34	38	11	5	18	34	64	-30
17	Tęcza Biskupiec	34	30	8	6	20	38	79	-41
18	Ewingi Zalewo	34	5	1	2	31	13	90	-77

- Polonia-Olimpia Elbląg changed name into Olimpia Elbląg.

== Season 2005–06 ==
New clubs:
- relegated from III liga "Łódź-Mazovia-Podlasie-Warmia/Masuria" group: OKS 1945 Olsztyn.
- promoted from Liga okręgowa: DKS Dobre Miasto and Płomień Ełk ("Warmia-Masuria I" group), Olimpia Olsztynek and Start Nidzica ("Warmia-Masuria II" group).

Final table:

Pos	Club	M	P	W	D	L	GF	GA	GD
1	Olimpia Elbląg	34	85	26	7	1	77	21	56
2	DKS Dobre Miasto [P]	34	79	25	4	5	61	19	42
3	OKS 1945 Olsztyn [R]	34	72	21	9	4	72	23	49
4	Płomień Ełk [P]	34	60	18	6	10	74	53	21
5	Motor Lubawa	34	52	15	7	12	55	48	7
6	Start Działdowo	34	51	15	6	13	51	49	2
7	Huragan Morąg	34	51	14	9	11	42	33	9
8	Granica Kętrzyn	34	45	13	6	15	52	53	-1
9	Sokół Ostróda	34	45	13	6	15	50	36	14
10	Polonia Pasłęk	34	44	12	8	14	49	70	-21
11	Mrągowia Mrągowo	34	44	11	11	12	50	50	0
12	Rominta Gołdap	34	41	11	8	15	44	50	-6
13	Start Nidzica [P]	34	40	11	7	16	46	46	0
14	Warmiak Łukta	34	39	11	6	17	44	61	-17
15	Victoria Bartoszyce	34	32	8	8	18	51	80	-29
16	Olimpia Olsztynek [P]	34	30	8	6	20	41	67	-26
17	Orlęta Reszel	34	25	6	7	21	35	83	-48
18	Mazur Ełk	34	20	5	5	24	34	86	-52

== Season 2006–07 ==
League reduced to 16 teams.

New clubs:

- relegated from III liga "Łódź-Mazovia-Podlasie-Warmia/Masuria" group: Jeziorak Iława.
- promoted from Liga okręgowa: Mamry Giżycko and MKS Szczytno ("Warmia-Masuria I" group), Zamek Kurzętnik and Zatoka Braniewo ("Warmia-Masuria II" group).

Final table:

Pos	Club	M	P	W	D	L	GF	GA	GD
1	OKS 1945 Olsztyn	30	81	27	0	3	87	27	60
2	Jeziorak Iława [R]	30	67	20	7	3	65	17	48
3	Huragan Morąg	30	64	19	7	4	48	22	26
4	Płomień Ełk	30	59	18	5	7	74	43	31
5	Mrągowia Mrągowo	30	44	13	5	12	50	43	7
6	Zatoka Braniewo [P]	30	42	13	3	14	54	54	0
7	Sokół Ostróda	30	40	11	7	12	34	41	-7
8	Granica Kętrzyn	30	35	8	11	11	33	55	-22
9	Motor Lubawa	30	35	9	8	13	37	44	-7
10	Start Działdowo	30	35	10	5	15	34	42	-8
11	Polonia Pasłęk	30	31	8	7	15	27	46	-19
12	Zamek Kurzętnik [P]	30	31	8	7	15	37	45	-8
13	Mamry Giżycko [P]	30	30	10	0	20	26	69	-43
14	Rominta Gołdap	30	29	6	11	13	40	55	-15
15	MKS Szczytno [P]	30	26	6	8	16	30	51	-21
16	DKS Dobre Miasto	30	20	3	11	16	27	49	-22

- Rominta Gołdap lost play-off to stay in IV liga.
- MKS Szczytno won play-off to stay in IV liga.

== Season 2007–08 ==
New clubs:
- promoted from Liga okręgowa: Czarni Olecko and Vęgoria Węgorzewo ("Warmia-Masuria I" group) and Concordia Elbląg ("Warmia-Masuria II" group).

Final table:

Pos	Club	M	P	W	D	L	GF	GA	GD
1	Jeziorak Iława	30	72	23	3	4	71	16	55
2	Huragan Morąg	30	71	22	5	3	86	23	63
3	Start Działdowo	30	58	17	7	6	54	27	27
4	Mrągowia Mrągowo	30	58	17	7	6	57	25	32
5	Vęgoria Węgorzewo [P]	30	55	17	4	9	52	29	23
6	Concordia Elbląg [P]	30	51	15	6	9	52	39	13
7	Czarni Olecko [P]	30	51	15	6	9	63	42	21
8	Zatoka Braniewo	30	48	15	3	12	51	49	2
9	Płomień Ełk	30	42	12	6	12	44	38	6
10	Sokół Ostróda	30	40	11	7	12	44	38	6
11	Polonia Pasłęk	30	31	8	7	15	34	54	-20
12	Zamek Kurzętnik	30	28	7	7	16	28	52	-24
13	Mamry Giżycko	30	24	6	6	18	26	57	-31
14	Granica Kętrzyn	30	24	7	3	20	33	73	-40
15	Motor Lubawa	30	18	4	6	20	29	71	-42
16	MKS Szczytno	30	7	2	1	27	15	106	-91

- Jeziorak Iława was promoted to II liga (new third level of Polish football league system) after winning the playoff.
- Teams from places 2-7 were promoted to new created III liga but in fact stayed on 4th level.
- Teams from places 9-14 stayed in IV liga but in fact they were moved to the 5th level.
- Zatoka Braniewo lost play-off to play in new III liga and stayed in IV liga.
- Motor Lubawa won play-off to stay in IV liga.
- MKS Szczytno lost play-off to stay in IV liga. The club eventually kept the place in IV liga because the league was expanded to 18 teams in the next season.

== Season 2008–09 ==
IV liga became the 5th level of Polish football league system due to the formation of Ekstraklasa as the top level league in Poland.

League expanded to 18 teams.
New clubs:

- promoted from Liga okręgowa: Błękitni Pasym, Mazur Ełk, MKS Korsze, Rominta Gołdap and Tęcza Biskupiec ("Warmia-Masuria I" group), GKS Wikielec, Start Nidzica, Tęcza Miłomłyn and ZKS Olimpia Elbląg. ("Warmia-Masuria II" group).

Final table:

Pos	Club	M	P	W	D	L	GF	GA	GD
1	Mazur Ełk [P]	34	77	25	2	7	111	45	66
2	Motor Lubawa	34	70	22	4	8	84	50	34
3	Zatoka Braniewo	34	70	22	4	8	83	45	38
4	Sokół Ostróda	34	69	22	3	9	105	43	62
5	MKS Korsze [P]	34	67	20	7	7	76	47	29
6	Błękitni Pasym [P]	34	64	19	7	8	105	41	64
7	Granica Kętrzyn	34	54	15	9	10	56	52	4
8	Tęcza Biskupiec [P]	34	52	16	4	14	74	71	3
9	GKS Wikielec [P]	34	50	13	11	10	43	39	4
10	Olimpia 2004 Elbląg [P]	34	45	13	6	15	47	69	-22
11	Płomień Ełk	34	39	12	3	19	41	69	-28
12	MKS Szczytno	34	38	9	11	14	43	64	-21
13	Polonia Pasłęk	34	38	8	14	12	37	51	-14
14	Rominta Gołdap [P]	34	37	10	7	17	44	73	-29
15	Start Nidzica [P]	34	31	9	4	21	52	84	-32
16	Zamek Kurzętnik	34	27	8	3	23	40	72	-32
17	Mamry Giżycko	34	20	4	8	22	23	83	-60
18	Tęcza Miłomłyn [P]	34	14	3	5	26	26	92	-66

- ZKS Olimpia Elbląg changed name into Olimpia 2004 Elbląg.

== Season 2009–10 ==
League reduced to 16 teams.

New clubs:

- promoted from Liga okręgowa: Pisa Barczewo ("Warmia-Masuria I" group) and Błękitni Orneta ("Warmia-Masuria II" group).

Final table:

Pos	Club	M	P	W	D	L	GF	GA	GD
1	Zatoka Braniewo	30	62	20	2	8	80	38	42
2	MKS Korsze	30	58	18	4	8	66	41	25
3	Płomień Ełk	30	55	16	7	7	69	40	29
4	Olimpia 2004 Elbląg	30	54	16	6	8	51	38	13
5	Granica Kętrzyn	30	50	14	8	8	50	38	12
6	GKS Wikielec	30	47	12	11	7	40	35	5
7	Błękitni Pasym	30	46	14	4	12	45	39	6
8	Sokół Ostróda	30	46	13	7	10	46	41	5
9	Rominta Gołdap	30	45	13	6	11	55	41	14
10	Start Nidzica	30	44	12	8	10	51	37	14
11	Błękitni Orneta [P]	30	30	8	6	16	58	77	-19
12	Pisa Barczewo [P]	30	30	8	6	16	31	49	-18
13	Polonia Pasłęk	30	27	8	3	19	45	86	-41
14	Zamek Kurzętnik	30	26	5	11	14	31	54	-23
15	Tęcza Biskupiec	30	25	6	7	17	41	73	-32
16	MKS Szczytno	30	23	6	6	18	33	63	-30

- MKS Szczytno lost 1 point and 2 goals due to financial difficulties.

== Season 2010–11 ==
New clubs:
- promoted from Liga okręgowa: OKS 1945 II Olsztyn ("Warmia-Masuria I" group) and Olimpia Olsztynek ("Warmia-Masuria II" group).

Final table:

Pos	Club	M	P	W	D	L	GF	GA	GD
1	Granica Kętrzyn	30	73	24	1	5	91	30	61
2	Olimpia 2004 Elbląg	30	69	22	3	5	71	23	48
3	Płomień Ełk	30	63	19	6	5	65	15	50
4	OKS 1945 II Olsztyn [P]	30	61	19	4	7	55	39	16
5	Start Nidzica	30	47	14	5	11	37	35	2
6	Błękitni Pasym	30	45	14	3	13	51	53	-2
7	Pisa Barczewo	30	44	14	2	14	38	34	4
8	Rominta Gołdap	30	43	13	4	13	48	41	7
9	Tęcza Biskupiec	30	43	14	1	15	57	67	-10
10	Polonia Pasłęk	30	42	12	6	12	31	44	-13
11	GKS Wikielec	30	41	11	8	11	34	45	-11
12	Sokół Ostróda	30	40	11	7	12	38	37	1
13	MKS Szczytno	30	25	7	4	19	25	52	-27
14	Olimpia Olsztynek [P]	30	20	6	2	22	27	54	-27
15	Błękitni Orneta	30	17	5	2	23	33	81	-48
16	Zamek Kurzętnik	30	16	4	4	22	20	71	-51

- OKS 1945 II Olsztyn changed name into Stomil II Olsztyn.

== Season 2011–12 ==
New clubs:
- relegated from III liga "Podlasie-Warmia/Masuria" group: Mazur Ełk and Vęgoria Węgorzewo.
- promoted from Liga okręgowa: Mamry Giżycko and Znicz Biała Piska ("Warmia-Masuria I" group), Barkas Tolkmicko and Drwęca Nowe Miasto Lubawskie ("Warmia-Masuria II" group).

Final table:

Pos	Club	M	P	W	D	L	GF	GA	GD
1	Sokół Ostróda	30	72	23	3	4	91	32	59
2	Płomień Ełk	30	66	20	6	4	70	28	42
3	Znicz Biała Piska [P]	30	59	18	5	7	59	32	27
4	Drwęca Nowe Miasto Lubawskie [P]	30	57	17	6	7	62	38	24
5	Rominta Gołdap	30	52	16	4	10	50	33	17
6	Barkas Tolkmicko [P]	30	50	15	5	10	56	45	11
7	Błękitni Pasym	30	46	15	1	14	59	54	5
8	GKS Wikielec	30	42	12	6	12	44	50	-6
9	Start Nidzica	30	40	12	4	14	46	50	-4
10	Pisa Barczewo	30	40	12	4	14	42	41	1
11	Stomil II Olsztyn	30	40	12	4	14	53	63	-10
12	Mamry Giżycko [P]	30	33	10	3	17	32	41	-9
13	Vęgoria Węgorzewo [R]	30	29	8	5	17	41	58	-17
14	Polonia Pasłęk	30	27	7	6	17	23	62	-39
15	Mazur Ełk [R]	30	23	6	5	19	33	77	-44
16	Tęcza Biskupiec	30	9	2	3	25	33	90	-57

== Season 2012–13 ==
New clubs:
- relegated from III liga "Podlasie-Warmia/Masuria" group: Zatoka Braniewo.
- promoted from Liga okręgowa: DKS Dobre Miasto and Omulew Wielbark ("Warmia-Masuria I" group), Polonia Iłowo-Osada and Orzeł Janowiec Kościelny ("Warmia-Masuria II" group).

Final table:

Pos	Club	M	P	W	D	L	GF	GA	GD
1	Barkas Tolkmicko	30	81	26	3	1	93	12	81
2	Znicz Biała Piska	30	71	23	2	5	98	31	67
3	Rominta Gołdap	30	64	20	4	6	59	28	31
4	GKS Wikielec	30	59	17	8	5	62	32	30
5	Pisa Barczewo	30	52	14	10	6	60	40	20
6	Stomil II Olsztyn	30	41	12	5	13	58	54	4
7	Omulew Wielbark [P]	30	38	9	11	10	35	41	-6
8	Mamry Giżycko	30	36	9	9	12	45	65	-20
9	DKS Dobre Miasto [P]	30	35	10	5	15	30	47	-17
10	Vęgoria Węgorzewo	30	34	9	7	14	48	65	-17
11	Drwęca Nowe Miasto Lubawskie	30	33	9	6	15	47	54	-7
12	Zatoka Braniewo [R]	30	31	9	4	17	36	61	-25
13	Start Nidzica	30	28	7	7	16	37	64	-27
14	Orzeł Janowiec Kościelny [P]	30	25	6	7	17	42	72	-30
15	Polonia Iłowo-Osada [P]	30	24	7	3	20	27	70	-43
16	Błękitni Pasym	30	19	4	7	19	33	74	-41

== Season 2013–14 ==
New clubs:
- relegated from III liga "Podlasie-Warmia/Masuria" group: Olimpia 2004 Elbląg.
- promoted from Liga okręgowa: Mazur Ełk and Victoria Bartoszyce ("Warmia-Masuria I" group), Olimpia Olsztynek and Warmiak Łukta ("Warmia-Masuria II" group).

Final table:

Pos	Club	M	P	W	D	L	GF	GA	GD
1	Rominta Gołdap	30	72	22	6	2	75	16	59
2	Olimpia Olsztynek [P]	30	60	18	6	6	78	40	38
3	GKS Wikielec	30	55	17	4	9	72	34	38
4	Stomil II Olsztyn	30	54	17	3	10	63	38	25
5	Pisa Barczewo	30	53	15	8	7	54	46	8
6	Drwęca Nowe Miasto Lubawskie	30	52	17	1	12	59	47	12
7	Zatoka Braniewo	30	44	13	5	12	52	59	-7
8	Warmiak Łukta [P]	30	43	12	7	11	56	57	-1
9	Omulew Wielbark	30	42	12	6	12	48	52	-4
10	DKS Dobre Miasto	30	40	12	4	14	27	41	-14
11	Olimpia II Elbląg [R]	30	36	11	3	16	37	48	-11
12	Mamry Giżycko	30	35	9	8	13	34	39	-5
13	Victoria Bartoszyce [P]	30	32	9	5	16	38	65	-27
14	Vęgoria Węgorzewo	30	29	8	5	17	43	60	-17
15	Mazur Ełk [P]	30	26	8	2	20	42	79	-37
16	Start Nidzica	30	8	1	5	24	19	76	-57

- Olimpia 2004 Elbląg merged before the season with Olimpia Elbląg and became the reserve (II) team of this club.
- Drwęca Nowe Miasto Lubawskie after the season merged with Barkas Tolkmicko and played the next season in III liga.
- Olimpia II Elbląg was relegated (based on the rule that there must be a difference at least two levels between two teams of the same club) because the first team had been relegated to III liga in new season.

== Season 2014–15 ==
New clubs:
- relegated from III liga "Podlasie-Warmia/Masuria" group: Granica Kętrzyn, Motor Lubawa and Mrągowia Mrągowo.
- promoted from Liga okręgowa: Start Kozłowo and Warmia Olsztyn ("Warmia-Masuria I" group), Błękitni Orneta and Polonia Pasłęk ("Warmia-Masuria II" group).

Final table:

Pos	Club	M	P	W	D	L	GF	GA	GD
1	Granica Kętrzyn [R]	30	64	19	7	4	74	30	44
2	GKS Wikielec	30	62	17	11	2	57	28	29
3	Warmiak Łukta	30	56	16	8	6	64	38	26
4	Błękitni Orneta [P]	30	53	15	8	7	46	29	17
5	Polonia Pasłęk [P]	30	51	15	6	9	63	45	18
6	Zatoka Braniewo	30	47	14	5	11	47	47	0
7	Mrągowia Mrągowo [R]	30	45	13	6	11	59	45	14
8	Pisa Barczewo	30	37	9	10	11	40	46	-6
9	Motor Lubawa [R]	30	36	9	9	12	34	41	-7
10	Start Kozłowo [P]	30	35	9	8	13	35	41	-6
11	Mamry Giżycko	30	34	8	10	12	40	46	-6
12	DKS Dobre Miasto	30	33	8	9	13	35	44	-9
13	Omulew Wielbark	30	31	8	7	15	35	44	-9
14	Stomil II Olsztyn	30	31	9	4	17	51	61	-10
15	Warmia Olsztyn [P]	30	26	7	5	18	34	81	-47
16	Victoria Bartoszyce	30	22	7	1	22	34	82	-48

== Season 2015–16 ==
New clubs:
- promoted from Liga okręgowa: Śniardwy Orzysz and Tęcza Biskupiec ("Warmia-Masuria I" group), Orzeł Janowiec Kościelny and Unia Susz ("Warmia-Masuria II" group).

Final table:

Pos	Club	M	P	W	D	L	GF	GA	GD
1	Motor Lubawa	30	65	21	2	7	64	27	37
2	Stomil II Olsztyn	30	60	18	6	6	63	27	36
3	Unia Susz [P]	30	59	18	5	7	60	25	35
4	Tęcza Biskupiec [P]	30	57	17	6	7	72	35	37
5	Zatoka Braniewo	30	53	16	5	9	53	36	17
6	Błękitni Orneta	30	53	15	8	7	47	23	24
7	Mamry Giżycko	30	49	14	7	9	62	44	18
8	Mrągowia Mrągowo	30	43	11	10	9	40	39	1
9	Warmiak Łukta	30	41	12	5	13	46	49	-3
10	Śniardwy Orzysz [P]	30	41	12	5	13	40	43	-3
11	Omulew Wielbark	30	36	11	3	16	36	52	-16
12	Polonia Pasłęk	30	34	8	10	12	27	38	-11
13	Orzeł Janowiec Kościelny [P]	30	28	7	7	16	35	58	-23
14	Pisa Barczewo	30	27	7	6	17	34	61	-27
15	DKS Dobre Miasto	30	8	2	2	26	14	91	-77
16	Start Kozłowo	30	21	6	3	21	20	65	-45

- Start Kozłowo withdrew in mid-season.
- Omulew Wielbark finally kept the place in IV liga since Start Działdowo relegated from III liga withdrew from playing in IV liga in the next season (Śniardwy Orzysz refused to take over the place from Start Działdowo).

== Season 2016–17 ==
New clubs:
- relegated from III liga "Podlasie-Warmia/Masuria" group: GKS Wikielec, Granica Kętrzyn, MKS Korsze, Rominta Gołdap and Znicz Biała Piska.
- promoted from Liga okręgowa: Orlęta Reszel ("Warmia-Masuria I" group) and GSZS Rybno ("Warmia-Masuria II" group).

Final table:

Pos	Club	M	P	W	D	L	GF	GA	GD
1	GKS Wikielec [R]	30	74	23	5	2	87	34	53
2	Znicz Biała Piska [R]	30	62	19	5	6	82	37	45
3	Unia Susz	30	62	19	5	6	65	35	30
4	Rominta Gołdap [R]	30	49	16	1	13	66	33	33
5	Zatoka Braniewo	30	48	14	6	10	59	51	8
6	Tęcza Biskupiec	30	47	14	5	11	62	51	11
7	Granica Kętrzyn [R]	30	45	14	3	13	57	49	8
8	Mrągowia Mrągowo	30	44	13	5	12	48	44	4
9	Mamry Giżycko	30	44	13	5	12	61	49	12
10	MKS Korsze [R]	30	42	12	6	12	49	51	-2
11	Orlęta Reszel [P]	30	40	12	4	14	50	59	-9
12	Błękitni Orneta	30	35	10	5	15	45	54	-9
13	Stomil II Olsztyn	30	33	10	3	17	43	69	-26
14	GSZS Rybno [P]	30	29	7	8	15	45	72	-27
15	Omulew Wielbark	30	20	4	8	18	32	82	-50
16	Warmiak Łukta	30	8	2	2	26	21	102	-81

- Warmiak Łukta withdrew in mid-season.

== Season 2017–18 ==
New clubs:
- relegated from III liga group 1: Concordia Elbląg and Motor Lubawa.
- promoted from Liga okręgowa: Błęklitni Pasym and Pisa Barczewo ("Warmia-Masuria I" group) and Tęcza Miłomłyn ("Warmia-Masuria II" group).

Final table:

Pos	Club	M	P	W	D	L	GF	GA	GD
1	Znicz Biała Piska	30	81	26	3	1	95	16	79
2	Unia Susz	30	52	15	7	8	68	38	30
3	Concordia Elbląg [R]	30	51	14	9	7	52	37	15
4	Mamry Giżycko	30	50	14	8	8	59	39	20
5	Tęcza Biskupiec	30	46	13	7	10	60	44	16
6	Rominta Gołdap	30	45	13	6	11	49	55	-6
7	Mrągowia Mrągowo	30	44	11	11	8	46	35	11
8	Tęcza Miłomłyn [P]	30	41	12	5	13	38	49	-11
9	Motor Lubawa [R]	30	41	11	8	11	45	36	9
10	Granica Kętrzyn	30	40	12	4	14	49	58	-9
11	Zatoka Braniewo	30	40	11	7	12	49	59	-10
12	MKS Korsze	30	38	12	2	16	58	65	-7
13	Błękitni Pasym [P]	30	35	10	5	15	55	72	-17
14	Pisa Barczewo [P]	30	29	8	5	17	35	64	-29
15	Orlęta Reszel	30	26	7	5	18	30	63	-33
16	Błękitni Orneta	30	14	4	2	24	26	84	-58

- Zatoka Braniewo won play-off to stay in IV liga.
- MKS Korsze won play-off to stay in IV liga.

== Season 2018–19 ==
New clubs:
- relegated from III liga group 1: Drwęca Nowe Miasto Lubawskie and GKS Wikielec.
- promoted from Liga okręgowa: Czarni Olecko ("Warmia-Masuria I" group) and Jeziorak Iława ("Warmia-Masuria II" group).
- co-opted: Olimpia II Elbląg (based on the rule that club playing at least in II liga can apply one year earlier for its reserve team to join IV liga).

Final table:

Pos	Club	M	P	W	D	L	GF	GA	GD
1	Concordia Elbląg	30	83	27	2	1	104	19	85
2	Motor Lubawa	30	66	21	3	6	62	30	32
3	Jeziorak Iława [P]	30	65	21	2	7	87	41	46
4	GKS Wikielec [R]	30	62	19	5	6	84	36	48
5	Mrągowia Mrągowo	30	55	17	4	9	61	30	31
6	Mamry Giżycko	30	49	14	7	9	52	39	13
7	MKS Korsze	30	48	14	6	10	55	47	8
8	Olimpia II Elbląg [P]	30	42	13	3	14	51	60	-9
9	Tęcza Biskupiec	30	39	12	3	15	68	55	13
10	Granica Kętrzyn	30	38	11	5	14	51	52	-1
11	Zatoka Braniewo	30	34	9	7	14	55	51	4
12	Unia Susz	30	27	7	6	17	42	77	-35
13	Rominta Gołdap	30	27	8	3	19	39	81	-42
14	Czarni Olecko [P]	30	23	5	8	17	35	71	-36
15	Drwęca Nowe Miasto Lubawskie [R]	30	16	4	4	22	37	101	-64
16	Tęcza Miłomłyn	30	11	3	2	25	25	118	-93

- Unia Susz lost play-off to stay in IV liga.
- Rominta Gołdap lost play-off to stay in IV liga.

== Season 2019–20 ==
New clubs:
- relegated from III liga group 1: Mazur Ełk.
- promoted from Liga okręgowa: Pisa Barczewo and Polonia Lidzbark Warmiński ("Warmia-Masuria I" group), Błękitni Orneta and Warmia Olsztyn ("Warmia-Masuria II" group).
- co-opted: Stomil II Olsztyn (based on the rule that club playing at least in II liga can apply one year earlier for its reserve team to join IV liga).

Final table (due to COVID-19 pandemic league was ended after 17th round):

Pos	Club	M	P	W	D	L	GF	GA	GD
1	GKS Wikielec	17	51	17	0	0	64	10	54
2	Jeziorak Iława	17	37	12	1	4	52	17	35
3	Stomil II Olsztyn [P]	17	36	12	0	5	44	21	23
4	Motor Lubawa	17	28	8	4	5	27	26	1
5	Mamry Giżycko	17	28	9	1	7	42	29	13
6	Mrągowia Mrągowo	17	28	9	1	7	43	25	18
7	Polonia Lidzbark Warmiński [P]	17	27	9	0	8	24	28	-4
8	Mazur Ełk [R]	16	21	6	3	7	26	28	-2
9	Pisa Barczewo [P]	17	20	6	2	9	24	38	-14
10	Granica Kętrzyn	17	18	5	3	9	25	52	-27
11	Błękitni Orneta [P]	16	18	5	3	8	22	44	-22
12	Olimpia II Elbląg	17	18	5	3	9	34	29	5
13	Zatoka Braniewo	17	17	5	2	10	21	38	-17
14	MKS Korsze	16	16	4	4	8	22	33	-11
15	Tęcza Biskupiec	17	15	5	0	12	22	46	-24
16	Warmia Olsztyn [P]	16	10	3	1	12	17	45	-28

== Season 2020–21 ==
League expanded to 18 teams.

New clubs:

- promoted from Liga okręgowa: Błękitni Pasym ("Warmia-Masuria I" group), GSZS Rybno and Olimpia Olsztynek ("Warmia-Masuria II" group).

Final table:
TBA

== All-time table ==
The table that follows is accurate as of the end of the 2019–20 season. It includes the clubs that played at least one match (even annulled) in IV liga Warmia-Masuria group since 2000/01 season.

Blue colour means that the club plays in IV liga in the current 2020–21 season.
Green colour means that the club plays higher than IV liga in the current 2020–21 season.

Dark grey colour means that the club does not play in any league in the current 2020–21 season.

Pos	Club	S	M	P	W	D	L	GF	GA	GD	county seat	seasons
1	Granica Kętrzyn	15	459	692	201	89	169	828	746	82	Kętrzyn	02-11, 15, 17-
2	Mrągowia Mrągowo	14	429	687	197	96	136	712	526	186	Mrągowo	01-08, 15-
3	Motor Lubawa	14	433	635	180	95	158	669	633	36	Iława	01-09, 15–16, 18-
4	Polonia Pasłęk	14	446	589	158	115	173	585	690	-105	Elbląg	01-12, 15-16
5	Sokół Ostróda	11	354	567	164	75	115	616	418	198	Ostróda	01, 03-12
6	Rominta Gołdap	12	372	548	160	68	144	614	556	58	Gołdap	05-07, 09–14, 17-19
7	GKS Wikielec	10	291	543	158	69	64	587	343	244	Iława	09-15, 17, 19-20
8	Zatoka Braniewo	13	351	536	161	53	137	640	588	52	Braniewo	02, 07–10, 13-
9	Stomil II (OKS 1945 II) Olsztyn	11	327	533	159	56	112	610	473	137	Olsztyn	01-03, 11–17, 20-
10	Jeziorak Iława	8	241	512	157	41	43	606	203	403	Iława	02-05, 07–08, 19-
11	Tęcza Biskupiec	13	397	485	141	62	194	682	801	-119	Olsztyn	01, 03–05, 09–12, 16-
12	Mamry Giżycko	13	385	447	123	78	184	533	697	-164	Giżycko	01, 07–09, 12-
13	Znicz (Płomień) Biała Piska	8	254	413	120	53	81	492	373	119	Pisz	01-04, 12–13, 17-18
14	Błękitni Orneta	11	330	402	114	60	156	488	621	-133	Lidzbark Warm.	01-04, 10–11, 15–18, 20-
15	Płomień Ełk	7	218	384	115	39	64	437	286	151	Ełk	06-12
16	Mazur Ełk	9	280	367	111	34	135	492	532	-40	Ełk	01, 03–06, 09, 12, 14, 20-
17	Drwęca Nowe Miasto Lubawskie	7	220	349	103	40	77	418	338	80	Nowe Miasto Lub.	01-03, 12–14, 19
18	MKS Korsze	8	238	341	100	41	97	400	417	-17	Kętrzyn	04-05, 09–10, 17-
19	Pisa Barczewo	9	257	332	93	53	111	358	419	-61	Olsztyn	10-16, 18, 20-
20	Start Działdowo	7	230	317	88	53	89	312	305	7	Działdowo	01, 03-08
21	Huragan Morąg	5	162	303	90	33	39	298	155	143	Ostróda	04-08
22	Start Nidzica	9	284	298	83	49	152	366	518	-152	Nidzica	02-03, 06, 09-14
23	Olimpia (Polonia) Elbląg	4	134	292	87	31	16	290	116	174	Elbląg	01-02, 05-06
24	DKS (Rolimpex, Warfama) Dobre Miasto	8	250	290	77	59	114	255	382	-127	Olsztyn	01-02, 06–07, 13-16
25	Orlęta Reszel	7	228	277	74	55	99	339	425	-86	Kętrzyn	02-06, 17-18
26	Błękitni Pasym	6	184	255	76	27	81	348	333	15	Szczytno	09-13, 18, 21-
27	Stomil (Warmia i Mazury, OKS 1945) Olsztyn	3	98	237	74	15	9	231	68	163	Olsztyn	04, 06-07
28	Warmiak Łukta	6	188	228	64	36	88	277	374	-97	Ostróda	05-06, 14-17
29	Unia Susz	4	120	200	59	23	38	235	175	60	Iława	15-19
30	Concordia Elbląg	3	90	185	56	17	17	208	95	113	Elbląg	08, 18-19
31	Olimpia Olsztynek	5	160	179	51	26	83	223	284	-61	Olsztyn	02-03, 06, 11, 14, 21-
32	Olimpia 2004 (ZKS) Elbląg	3	94	168	51	15	28	169	130	39	Elbląg	09-11
33	Omulew Wielbark	5	150	167	44	35	71	186	271	-85	Szczytno	13-17
34	Zamek Kurzętnik	6	188	166	42	40	106	199	344	-145	Nowe Miasto Lub.	05, 07-11
35	Polonia Lidzbark Warmiński	4	119	164	49	17	53	168	211	-43	Lidzbark Warm.	01, 03–04, 20-
36	MKS Szczytno	6	188	150	38	37	113	196	410	-214	Szczytno	01, 07-11
37	Victoria Bartoszyce	5	160	148	40	28	92	203	377	-174	Bartoszyce	02, 05–06, 14-15
38	Vęgoria Węgorzewo	4	120	147	42	21	57	184	212	-28	Węgorzewo	08, 12-14
39	Barkas Tolkmicko	2	60	131	41	8	11	149	57	92	Elbląg	12-13
40	Czarni Małdyty	2	66	105	29	18	19	102	80	22	Ostróda	02-03
41	Olimpia II Elblag	3	77	96	29	9	39	122	137	-15	Elbląg	14, 19-
42	Czarni Olecko	2	60	74	20	14	26	98	113	-15	Olecko	08, 19
43	Tęcza Miłomłyn	3	94	66	18	12	64	89	259	-170	Ostróda	09, 18-19
44	Warmia Olsztyn	3	80	62	16	14	50	89	203	-114	Olsztyn	04, 15, 20-
45	Start Kozłowo	2	60	56	15	11	34	55	106	-51	Mrągowo	15-16
46	Orzeł Janowiec Kościelny	2	60	53	13	14	33	77	130	-53	Nidzica	13, 16
47	Ewingi Zalewo	2	68	42	11	9	48	62	147	-85	Iława	04-05
48	Śniardwy Orzysz	1	30	41	12	5	13	40	43	-3	Pisz	16
49	Łyna Sępopol	1	34	34	9	7	18	49	67	-18	Bartoszyce	01
50	GSZS Rybno	1	30	29	7	8	15	45	72	-27	Działdowo	17, 21-
51	Polonia Iłowo-Osada	1	30	24	7	3	20	27	70	-43	Działdowo	13
52	Mazur Pisz	1	32	17	3	8	21	16	65	-49	Pisz	02
53	Syrena Młynary	1	34	13	3	4	27	36	114	-78	Elbląg	01

- MKS Szczytno lost 1 point and 2 goals due to financial difficulties in 2009/10 season.
- The results of Warmia i Mazury Olsztyn from 2002/03 season are counted for the reserve team and from 2003/04 season for the first team of Stomil Olsztyn.

== Locations of the clubs ==
Locations of all clubs playing in IV liga Warmia-Masuria group:
