= Polonia Lidzbark Warmiński =

Polish football club

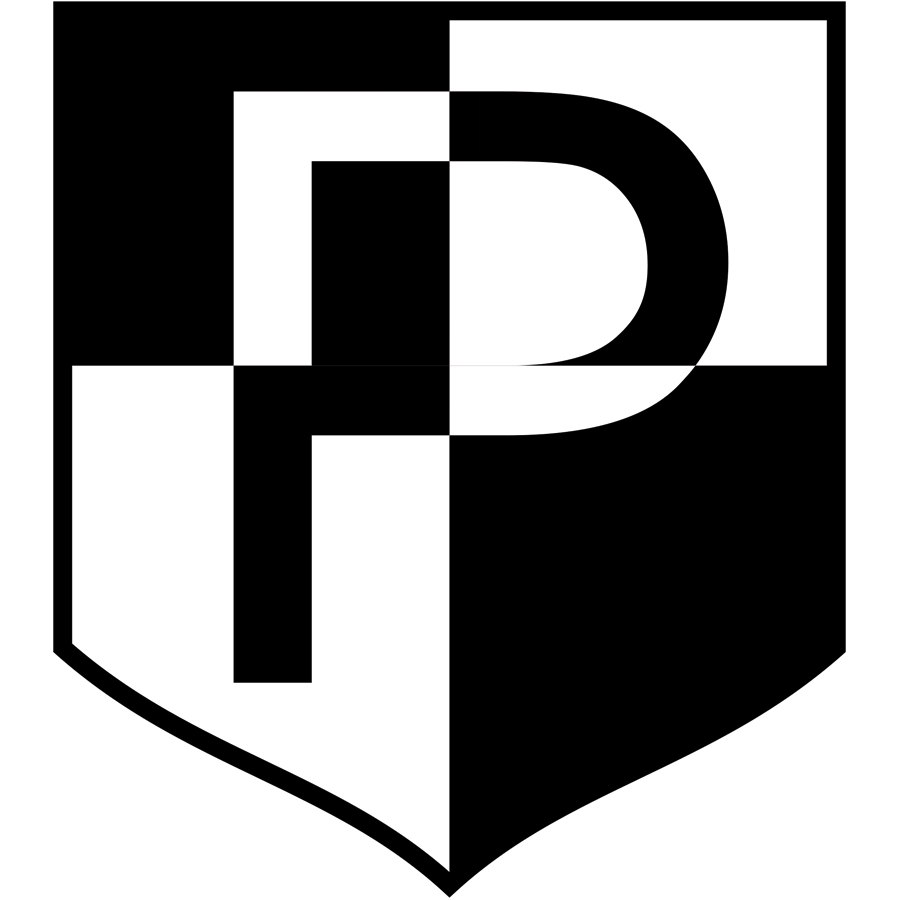
- Full name: Miejski Klub Sportowy Sokół Polonia Lidzbark Warmiński
- Founded: 1957; 69 years ago
- Ground: Stadion Miejski im. Henryka Wobalisa
- Capacity: 1,650
- Chairman: Mariusz Miecznikowski
- Manager: Piotr Jacek
- League: III liga, group I
- 2025–26: IV liga Warmia-Masuria, 1st of 16 (promoted)
- Website: polonialidzbark.pl

Polonia Lidzbark Warmiński is a football club based in Lidzbark Warmiński, Poland. They compete in group I of the III liga, the fourth tier of the Polish football league system, after winning the 2025–26 IV liga Warmia-Masuria.

== Stadium ==
Polonia's home stadium is the Henryk Wobalis Municipal Stadium. It holds 1,650 people and was recently renovated and modernized in 2010.

== Players ==
=== Current squad ===
As of 29 October 2025

Note: Flags indicate national team as defined under FIFA eligibility rules; some limited exceptions apply. Players may hold more than one non-FIFA nationality.

| No. | Pos. | Nation | Player |
|---|---|---|---|
| 1 | GK | POL | Jakub Kanclerz |
| 4 | DF | BLR | Mark Usovich |
| 5 | DF | POL | Wiktor Preuss |
| 6 | MF | JPN | Yudai Shinonaga |
| 7 | FW | POL | Maciej Radaszkiewicz |
| 9 | FW | POL | Mateusz Kuzimski |
| 11 | MF | POL | Klaudiusz Krasa |
| 14 | DF | POL | Michał Skarbek |
| 16 | MF | POL | Dawid Bogdanski |
| 17 | DF | POL | Szymon Szalkowski |
| 18 | MF | POL | Antoni Myszkowski |

| No. | Pos. | Nation | Player |
|---|---|---|---|
| 19 | DF | POL | Wojciech Dziemidowicz |
| 21 | MF | BLR | Yan Senkevich |
| 22 | DF | POL | Rafal Maciążek |
| 26 | DF | POL | Igor Olszewski |
| 27 | MF | POL | Bartłomiej Gorzycki |
| 30 | MF | POL | Kamil Kmiołek |
| 33 | GK | POL | Marian Kuc |
| 88 | MF | POL | Cezary Sobolewski |
| - | FW | RUS | Sergey Gurov |
| - | MF | POL | Jakub Fijalkowski |
