= Avia Świdnik =

Polish football club

- Full name: Miejski Klub Sportowy; Avia Świdnik
- Nicknames: Żółto-Niebiescy (The Yellow and Blues)
- Founded: 1 May 1952; 74 years ago (as Robotniczy Klub Sportowy Stal nr 4)
- Ground: Czesław Krygier Municipal Stadium
- Capacity: 2,886
- Chairman: Sebastian Lemieszek
- Manager: Wojciech Szacoń
- League: II liga
- 2025–26: III liga, group IV, 1st of 18 (promoted)
- Website: avia-swidnik.pl/pilka-nozna/
| Home colours | Away colours |

Avia Świdnik is a Polish multi-sports club based in Świdnik.

As of the 2026–27 season, the men's football section plays in the II liga, the third level of the national football league system, having won promotion from the 2025–26 III liga.

They have played a total of 22 seasons in the II liga. During the 1985–86 season, they reached the quarter-final of the Polish Cup, and repeated the same feat 40 years later, in the 2025–26 edition.

== Players ==
=== Current squad ===
As of 20 November 2026

Note: Flags indicate national team as defined under FIFA eligibility rules; some limited exceptions apply. Players may hold more than one non-FIFA nationality.

| No. | Pos. | Nation | Player |
|---|---|---|---|
| 1 | GK | POL | Łukasz Jakubowski (on loan from ŁKS Łódź) |
| 3 | DF | POL | Rafał Kursa (3rd captain) |
| 4 | DF | POL | Kamil Rozmus |
| 6 | DF | POL | Kacper Orzechowski |
| 7 | MF | POL | Wojciech Kalinowski (captain) |
| 8 | FW | POL | Michał Zuber |
| 9 | MF | UKR | Andriy Remenyuk |
| 10 | MF | POL | Grzegorz Aftyka |
| 11 | FW | POL | Dawid Łącki |
| 12 | GK | POL | Andrzej Sobieszczyk |
| 14 | DF | POL | Michał Wróblewski |
| 15 | MF | ENG | Dave Djalme Assunção |
| 17 | MF | POL | Szymon Kamiński |
| 18 | FW | POL | Wiktor Marek |
| 19 | MF | POL | Wojciech Karasiewicz |

| No. | Pos. | Nation | Player |
|---|---|---|---|
| 23 | MF | POL | Bartosz Falbierski |
| 24 | MF | POL | Paweł Uliczny |
| 25 | MF | POL | Damian Zbozień (vice-captain) |
| 26 | DF | POL | Michał Kołodziejski |
| 27 | FW | POL | Dominik Pisarek |
| 31 | GK | POL | Mateusz Białka |
| 33 | MF | POL | Marcin Pigiel |
| 36 | MF | POL | Kacper Jodłowski |
| 42 | MF | POL | David Niepsuj |
| 47 | MF | POL | Dominik Skiba (on loan from Górnik Zabrze) |
| 80 | MF | SLO | Egzon Kryeziu |
| 90 | FW | POL | Kacper Wełniak |
| 99 | DF | POL | Marcin Kumorek |
| — | DF | POL | Jan Flak |

=== Other players under contract ===
Note: Flags indicate national team as defined under FIFA eligibility rules; some limited exceptions apply. Players may hold more than one non-FIFA nationality.

| No. | Pos. | Nation | Player |
|---|---|---|---|
| — | MF | POL | Kamil Wojtkowski |
