= III liga =

4th tier in the Polish football league

- Organising body: PZPN
- Founded: 19 February 2000; 26 years ago (new formula); 2008; 18 years ago (as III liga)
- Country: Poland
- Confederation: UEFA
- Number of clubs: 72 (4 groups of 18)
- Level on pyramid: 4
- Promotion to: II liga
- Relegation to: IV liga
- Domestic cup: Polish Cup
- Current champions: Legia Warsaw II (Group I); Zawisza Bydgoszcz (Group II); Lechia Zielona Góra (Group III); Avia Świdnik (Group IV) (2025–26)
- Sponsor(s): Betclic
- Current: 2026–27 III liga

III liga (Trzecia liga, lit. 'Third League'), currently named Betclic III liga due to its sponsorship by Betclic, is a Polish football league that sits in the fourth tier of the Polish football league system. Until the end of the 2007–08 season, III liga referred to a league at the third tier (now called II liga) but this was changed with the formation of the Ekstraklasa as the top level league in Poland.

Groups of III liga are divided based on administrative division of Poland. Top teams of III liga are promoted to II liga and bottom teams are relegated to IV liga.

== History ==
The current fourth tier of the Polish national league system was established on 19 February 2000, under the name IV liga. Previously, the fourth tier of competition was held under many different names depending on the region, including macro-regional league, macro-regional class, inter-voivodeship league, district league, among others.

In August 2000, the first official season of new fourth tier commenced with teams spread across 21 territorial groups. In five voivodeships (Lower Silesia, Lesser Poland, Masovia, Silesia and Greater Poland), the competition was divided into two groups, the winners of which met in a two-legged play-off for the championship and promotion to the third tier. In the remaining 11 voivodeships, only one group was held, the winner of which automatically earning promoted to a higher division. In subsequent editions, the number of groups was gradually reduced and the number of teams in each of them was limited. In 2001, both Lower Silesian groups were merged, in 2002 - the Masovian ones, and in 2006, the Lesser Poland groups. In 2007, the fourth tier consisted of 18 regional groups. In 14 voivodeships, the games were played with a single-group system, and in two voivodeships, with a two-group system.

Starting from the 2008–09 season, the league was renamed to III liga, and reduced to 8 groups. The winners of each group (in the case of voivodeships with two groups, the winners of the play-offs between the winners of both groups) formed four play-off pairs, winners of which were promoted to the II liga.

The latest restructure came in effect ahead of the 2016–17 season, with the numbers of teams reduced to 72 across four groups.

== Current format ==
For the 2024–25 season, seventy-two clubs participate. The clubs are split into four parallel groups of 18 with their group affiliation being based on the regional location. The competition is played in a round-robin format, with each team facing others in their respective group twice, at home and away. The champions of each group achieve automatic promotion to the II liga, while the second-placed teams first face each other in a play-off, the winners of which qualify for a promotion/relegation play-off against 13th and 14th-placed II liga teams. The bottom four teams in each group are relegated to the IV liga, though the number of relegated teams may increase depending on territorial affiliation of the teams demoted from the II liga.

== Clubs ==
Geographical criteria since the 2016–17 season.

The following 72 clubs are competing in the III liga for the 2026–27 season.

Group I	Group II	Group III	Group IV
Jagiellonia Białystok II; KS CK Troszyn; KTS Weszło; Lechia Tomaszów Mazowiecki; ŁKS Łomża; ŁKS Łódź II; Mazovia Mińsk Mazowiecki; Mławianka Mława; Olimpia Elbląg; Olimpia Zambrów; Pelikan Łowicz; Polonia Lidzbark Warmiński; Świt Nowy Dwór Mazowiecki; Warta Sieradz; Widzew Łódź II; Wigry Suwałki; Wisła Płock II; Ząbkovia Ząbki	Bałtyk Koszalin; Błękitni Stargard; Chemik Bydgoszcz; Elana Toruń; Flota Świnoujście; Gedania Gdańsk; Grom Nowy Staw; KKS 1925 Kalisz; Kluczevia Stargard; Kotwica Kórnik; Lech Poznań II; Lipno Stęszew; Noteć Czarnków; Polonia Środa Wielkopolska; Unia Swarzędz; Victoria Września; Wda Świecie; Wikęd Luzino	Barycz Sułów; Carina Gubin; Górnik Polkowice; Karkonosze Jelenia Góra; KS Goczałkowice-Zdrój; Miedź Legnica II; MKS Kluczbork; Odra Bytom Odrzański; Polonia Nysa; Raków Częstochowa II; ROW 1964 Rybnik; Sparta Katowice; Stal Brzeg; Stilon Gorzów Wielkopolski; Ślęza Wrocław; Warta Gorzów Wielkopolski; Zagłębie Lubin II; Zagłębie Sosnowiec	AKS 1947 Busko-Zdrój; Chełmianka Chełm; Czarni Połaniec; Hetman Zamość; JKS Jarosław; Korona Kielce II; KSZO Ostrowiec Świętokrzyski; Moravia Morawica; Naprzód Jędrzejów; Podlasie Biała Podlaska; Pogoń-Sokół Lubaczów; Siarka Tarnobrzeg; Sokół Kolbuszowa Dolna; Star Starachowice; Wieczysta Kraków II; Wisła Kraków II; Wisłoka Dębica; Wiślanie Skawina

== Champions of the Polish fourth level ==
Season	Group I	Group II	Group III	Group IV
2016–17	Drwęca Nowe Miasto Lubawskie	Gwardia Koszalin	GKS Jastrzębie	Garbarnia Kraków
2017–18	Widzew Łódź	Elana Toruń	Skra Częstochowa	Resovia
2018–19	Legionovia Legionowo	Lech Poznań II	Górnik Polkowice	Stal Rzeszów
2019–20	Sokół Ostróda	KKS 1925 Kalisz	Śląsk Wrocław II	Motor Lublin
2020–21	Pogoń Grodzisk Mazowiecki	Radunia Stężyca	Ruch Chorzów	Wisła Puławy
2021–22	Polonia Warsaw	Kotwica Kołobrzeg	Zagłębie Lubin II	Siarka Tarnobrzeg
2022–23	ŁKS Łódź II	Olimpia Grudziądz	Polonia Bytom	Stal Stalowa Wola
2023–24	Pogoń Grodzisk Mazowiecki	Świt Szczecin	Rekord Bielsko-Biała	Wieczysta Kraków
2024–25	Unia Skierniewice	Sokół Kleczew	Śląsk Wrocław II	Sandecja Nowy Sącz
2025–26	Legia Warsaw II	Zawisza Bydgoszcz	Lechia Zielona Góra	Avia Świdnik

== Groups ==
=== Seasons 2000–01 — 2007–08 ===
18–21 parallel divisions as IV liga (one or two in each of 16 Voivodeship)

- 2000–01 season – 21 groups
- 2001–02 season – 20 groups
- 2002–03 season – 19 groups
- 2003–04 season – 19 groups
- 2004–05 season – 19 groups
- 2005–06 season – 19 groups
- 2006–07 season – 18 groups
- 2007–08 season – 18 groups

=== Seasons 2008–09 — 2015–16 ===
8 parallel divisions as III liga.

- Group A (Łódź – Masovian)
- Group B (Podlaskie – Warmian-Masurian)
- Group C (Kuyavian-Pomeranian – Greater Poland)
- Group D (Pomeranian – West Pomeranian)
- Group E (Lower Silesian – Lubusz)
- Group F (Opole – Silesian)
- Group G (Świętokrzyskie – Lesser Poland)
- Group H (Lublin – Podkarpackie)

=== Seasons 2016–17 and onwards ===
4 parallel divisions as III liga.

- Group I (Łódź – Masovian – Podlaskie – Warmian-Masurian)
- Group II (Kuyavian-Pomeranian – Greater Poland – Pomeranian – West Pomeranian)
- Group III (Lower Silesian – Lubusz – Opole – Silesian)
- Group IV (Świętokrzyskie – Lesser Poland – Lublin – Podkarpackie)
