= List of Polish football transfers summer 2026 =

This is a list of Polish football transfers for the 2026 summer transfer window. Only transfers featuring Ekstraklasa are listed.

== Ekstraklasa ==
Note: Flags indicate national team as has been defined under FIFA eligibility rules. Players may hold more than one non-FIFA nationality.

=== Lech Poznań ===
In:

No.	Pos.	Nation	Player
1	GK	POL	Mateusz Lis (from (Turkey) Göztepe)
5	MF	SWE	Gustav Berggren (from (United States) New York Red Bulls)
17	FW	IRI	Allahyar Sayyadmanesh (from (Belgium) Westerlo)
59	DF	GHA	Terry Yegbe (from (France) Metz)
77	FW	HON	Luis Palma (from (Scotland) Celtic, previously on loan)

Out:

No.	Pos.	Nation	Player
1	GK	BUL	Plamen Andreev (loan return to (Netherlands) Feyenoord)
6	MF	KEN	Timothy Ouma (loan return to (Czech Republic) Slavia Prague)
16	DF	CRO	Antonio Milić (to Wieczysta Kraków)
23	MF	ISL	Gísli Þórðarson (on loan to (Germany) FC St. Pauli)
41	GK	POL	Bartosz Mrozek (to (Italy) Udinese)
44	MF	POL	Tymoteusz Gmur (on loan to Stal Mielec)
53	MF	POL	Sammy Dudek (on loan to Unia Skierniewice)
56	MF	POL	Kornel Lisman (to (Italy) Venezia)
88	FW	NGR	Taofeek Ismaheel (loan return to Górnik Zabrze)
—	DF	USA	Ian Hoffmann (on loan to (Sweden) Mjällby, previously on loan at (Norway) HamKam)
—	MF	POL	Bartłomiej Barański (on loan to Odra Opole, previously on loan at GKS Tychy)
—	GK	POL	Krzysztof Bąkowski (to Chrobry Głogów, previously on loan at (Norway) KFUM)
—	FW	POL	Filip Szymczak (to Zagłębie Lubin, previously on loan at (Belgium) Charleroi)
—	FW	NOR	Bryan Fiabema (to (Norway) Fredrikstad, previously on loan at (Netherlands) ADO Den Haag)

=== Górnik Zabrze ===
In:

No.	Pos.	Nation	Player
1	GK	GER	Philipp Schulze (from (Germany) SC Verl)
2	DF	POL	Patryk Warczak (from Stal Rzeszów)
3	DF	POL	Michał Synoś (from Stal Rzeszów)
6	MF	DEN	Malthe Højholt (from (Italy) Pisa)
8	MF	POR	Paulo Bernardo (on loan from (Scotland) Celtic)
9	FW	MTQ	Janis Antiste (on loan from (Italy) Sassuolo, previously on loan at (Austria) Rapid Wien)
11	FW	SVK	Erik Prekop (from (Czech Republic) Slavia Prague)
19	FW	DOM	Peter González (from (Spain) Getafe, previously on loan at (Spain) Real Valladolid)
21	DF	CZE	Ondřej Zmrzlý (from (Czech Republic) Slavia Prague, previously on loan)
27	FW	SWE	Zeidane Inoussa (on loan from (Wales) Swansea City)
34	FW	CRO	Bruno Durdov (from (Croatia) Hajduk Split)
66	MF	USA	Maximilian Dietz (from (Germany) Greuther Fürth)
82	MF	POL	Kacper Urbański (from Legia Warsaw)
—	MF	CGO	Gédéon Nongo (from (Republic of the Congo) Otohô)

Out:

No.	Pos.	Nation	Player
1	GK	POL	Marcel Łubik (loan return to (Germany) FC Augsburg)
3	DF	POL	Michał Synoś (on loan to Bruk-Bet Termalica)
5	DF	POL	Kryspin Szcześniak (on loan to Radomiak Radom)
8	MF	CZE	Patrik Hellebrand (to Korona Kielce)
10	FW	GER	Lukas Podolski (retired)
15	MF	GER	Roberto Massimo (on loan to (Germany) Wehen Wiesbaden)
16	DF	POL	Paweł Olkowski (to GKS Tychy)
17	DF	POL	Kamil Lukoszek (on loan to Motor Lublin)
18	MF	CZE	Lukáš Ambros (to (Belgium) Anderlecht)
21	MF	DEN	Mathias Sauer (to (Norway) Sandefjord)
24	DF	POL	Radosław Szafrański (to Odra Bytom Odrzański)
36	MF	POL	Michał Rakoczy (on loan to Podbeskidzie)
77	FW	BUL	Borislav Rupanov (on loan to (Portugal) União Leiria)
—	MF	CGO	Gédéon Nongo (on loan to Stal Stalowa Wola)
—	GK	POL	Kamil Soberka (on loan to Stal Stalowa Wola, previously on loan at Wieczysta Kraków)
—	GK	POL	Mateusz Jeleń (on loan to Polonia Warsaw, previously on loan at Sandecja Nowy Sącz)
—	DF	POL	Dominik Szala (on loan to Śląsk Wrocław, previously on loan at Stal Mielec)
—	DF	POL	Maksymilian Pingot (on loan to Odra Opole, previously on loan at ŁKS Łódź)
—	MF	POL	Natan Dzięgielewski (on loan to Arka Gdynia, previously on loan at Wieczysta Kraków)
—	DF	POL	Norbert Barczak (to Korona Kielce, previously on loan at Puszcza Niepołomice)
—	MF	POL	Wiktor Nowak (to (Czech Republic) Slavia Prague, previously on loan at Wisła Płock)
—	FW	NGR	Taofeek Ismaheel (to (Azerbaijan) Qarabağ, previously on loan at Lech Poznań)
—	FW	POL	Aleksander Buksa (to Stal Rzeszów, previously on loan at Polonia Warsaw)
—	FW	BRA	Gabriel Barbosa (to (Portugal) Farense, previously on loan at (Slovakia) Tatran Prešov)
—	FW	GRE	Theodoros Tsirigotis (to (Greece) Athens Kallithea, previously on loan at (Finland) TPS)

=== Jagiellonia Białystok ===
In:

No.	Pos.	Nation	Player
1	GK	POL	Michał Perchel (from Puszcza Niepołomice)
10	FW	SWE	Jeremy Agbonifo (on loan from (France) Lens, previously on loan at (Sweden) Häcken)
14	MF	SWE	Hampus Finndell (from (Sweden) Djurgården)
19	MF	DEN	Anders Klynge (from (Norway) Bodø/Glimt)
20	DF	POL	Bartłomiej Wdowik (reloan from (Portugal) Braga)
27	DF	POR	Rodrigo Conceição (from (Portugal) Tondela)
30	FW	SEN	Ousmane Sow (on loan from (Denmark) Brøndby)
32	MF	SRB	Aleksandar Ćirković (on loan from (Hungary) Ferencváros, previously on loan at Lechia Gdańsk)
99	FW	SLO	Nik Prelec (from (England) Oxford United)
—	MF	POL	Jakub Kucharski (from Stal Rzeszów)

Out:

No.	Pos.	Nation	Player
7	DF	ESP	Alejandro Pozo (loan return to (Spain) Almería)
10	FW	COD	Afimico Pululu (to (Saudi Arabia) Al-Hazem)
14	FW	BIH	Samed Baždar (loan return to (Spain) Real Zaragoza)
19	MF	ESP	Matías Nahuel (loan return to (Israel) Maccabi Haifa)
22	GK	POL	Miłosz Piekutowski (to (France) Strasbourg)
31	MF	USA	Leon Flach (on loan to (Germany) VfL Osnabrück])
70	DF	MAD	Andy Pelmard (loan return to (France) Clermont)
86	MF	POL	Bartosz Mazurek (to (Austria) Red Bull Salzburg)
—	MF	USA	Aziel Jackson (on loan to (United States) Minnesota United, previously on loan at (Canada) Vancouver Whitecaps)
—	FW	POL	Alan Rybak (on loan to Chrobry Głogów, previously on loan at Pogoń Siedlce)
—	MF	POL	Wojciech Łaski (to Rekord Bielsko-Biała, previously on loan)
—	MF	JPN	Tōki Hirosawa (to Podbeskidzie, previously on loan at KKS Kalisz)

=== Raków Częstochowa ===
In:

No.	Pos.	Nation	Player
3	DF	SWE	Arvid Brorsson (from (Italy) Monza)
11	FW	AZE	Mahir Emreli (on loan from (Germany) 1. FC Kaiserslautern)
15	MF	POL	Oliwier Kwiatkowski (from Polonia Bytom)
17	MF	POL	Jakub Jendryka (from Ruch Chorzów)
19	DF	SWE	Nils Zätterström (on loan from (England) Sheffield United, previously on loan at (Italy) Genoa)
36	MF	MNE	Marko Perović (from (Spain) Almería, previously on loan at (Spain) Atlético Madrileño)
71	GK	BIH	Tarik Karić (from (Bosnia and Herzegovina) Velež Mostar)
77	DF	CIV	Dieudonné Gaucho Debohi (from (France) Caen)
88	FW	HUN	Ádin Molnár (from (Hungary) MTK Budapest)

Out:

No.	Pos.	Nation	Player
2	DF	POL	Ariel Mosór (to Korona Kielce)
10	MF	ESP	Ivi (to (Greece) Iraklis)
17	FW	POR	Leonardo Rocha (to (Japan) JEF United Chiba)
18	FW	NOR	Jonatan Braut Brunes (to (Czech Republic) Sparta Prague)
19	MF	POL	Michael Ameyaw (to Korona Kielce)
24	DF	CRO	Zoran Arsenić (to Legia Warsaw)
27	DF	POL	Paweł Dawidowicz (to (Italy) Hellas Verona)
31	GK	POL	Dominik Czeremski (on loan to Stal Brzeg)
35	DF	SLO	Mitja Ilenič (loan return to (United States) New York City)
48	GK	POL	Oliwier Zych (loan return to (England) Aston Villa)
—	GK	POL	Jakub Rajczykowski (on loan to Świt Szczecin, previously on loan at Polonia Bytom)
—	GK	BIH	Muhamed Šahinović (on loan to (Serbia) Radnički 1923, previously on loan at (Croatia) Gorica)
—	MF	POL	Kacper Nowakowski (on loan to ŁKS Łódź, previously on loan at Chrobry Głogów)
—	MF	COL	Jesús Díaz (on loan to (Colombia) Cúcuta Deportivo, previously on loan at Zagłębie Lubin)
—	MF	POL	Antoni Burkiewicz (on loan to Unia Skierniewice, previously on loan at Podhale Nowy Targ)
—	MF	SRB	Srđan Plavšić (to (Serbia) Železničar Pančevo, previously on loan at (Czech Republic) Baník Ostrava)

=== GKS Katowice ===
In:

No.	Pos.	Nation	Player
1	GK	POL	Maciej Kikolski (on loan from Widzew Łódź)
31	MF	POL	Szymon Bartlewicz (from Chrobry Głogów)
55	DF	ESP	Pau Resta (from Korona Kielce)
68	MF	POL	Bartosz Wolski (from Motor Lublin)
87	GK	POL	Gabriel Kobylak (from Legia Warsaw)

Out:

No.	Pos.	Nation	Player
1	GK	POL	Dawid Kudła (to Zagłębie Sosnowiec)
2	DF	EST	Märten Kuusk (to Polonia Warsaw)
16	DF	POL	Grzegorz Rogala (to Górnik Łęczna)
17	MF	POL	Mateusz Marzec (to Pogoń Siedlce)
20	MF	POL	Filip Rejczyk (to Warta Poznań)
24	DF	POL	Konrad Gruszkowski (to Arka Gdynia)
25	DF	POL	Łukasz Trepka (on loan to Pogoń Siedlce)
28	MF	POL	Alan Bród (to Podhale Nowy Targ)
—	FW	POL	Maciej Rosołek (to Pogoń Siedlce, previously on loan)

=== Legia Warsaw ===
In:

No.	Pos.	Nation	Player
1	GK	CRO	Ivan Brkić (from Motor Lublin)
2	DF	JPN	Shinnosuke Fukuda (on loan from (Japan) Kyoto Sanga)
5	DF	USA	Robert Deziel Jr. (from (Germany) Bayern Munich II)
7	FW	CZE	Jan Kuchta (on loan from (Czech Republic) Sparta Prague)
23	MF	CZE	Michal Ševčík (on loan from (Czech Republic) Sparta Prague, previously on loan at (Czech Republic) Mladá Boleslav)
24	DF	CRO	Zoran Arsenić (from Raków Częstochowa)
27	FW	UKR	Bohdan Vyunnyk (on loan from Lechia Gdańsk)
79	FW	POL	Łukasz Zjawiński (from Polonia Warsaw)

Out:

No.	Pos.	Nation	Player
1	GK	POL	Kacper Tobiasz (to (Turkey) Gaziantep)
5	MF	POR	Claude Gonçalves (to (Slovenia) Maribor)
12	DF	SRB	Radovan Pankov (to (Indonesia) Persija Jakarta)
18	FW	CMR	Jean-Pierre Nsame (to Pogoń Szczecin)
22	MF	COL	Juergen Elitim (to (Turkey) Bursaspor)
23	MF	POL	Patryk Kun (to Wisła Płock)
27	GK	POL	Gabriel Kobylak (to GKS Katowice)
29	FW	DEN	Mileta Rajović (on loan to (Denmark) Midtjylland)
30	DF	SLO	Petar Stojanović (on loan to (Slovenia) Maribor)
51	MF	POL	Pascal Mozie (to (France) Annecy)
55	DF	POL	Artur Jędrzejczyk (retired)
56	DF	POL	Jan Leszczyński (to (Germany) Borussia Mönchengladbach)
77	MF	KOS	Ermal Krasniqi (loan return to (Czech Republic) Sparta Prague)
82	MF	POL	Kacper Urbański (to Górnik Zabrze)
—	GK	POL	Wojciech Banasik (to Polonia Bytom, previously on loan)
—	GK	POL	Marcel Mendes-Dudziński (to Piast Gliwice, previously on loan at Świt Szczecin)
—	DF	ESP	Sergio Barcia (to (Portugal) Braga, previously on loan at (Spain) Las Palmas)
—	MF	POL	Igor Strzałek (to ŁKS Łódź, previously on loan at Bruk-Bet Termalica)
—	MF	POL	Jakub Adkonis (to Lechia Gdańsk, previously on loan at Pogoń Grodzisk Mazowiecki)

=== Zagłębie Lubin ===
In:

No.	Pos.	Nation	Player
6	DF	CRO	David Čolina (from (Germany) FC Augsburg, previously on loan at (Croatia) Osijek)
18	FW	POL	Filip Szymczak (from Lech Poznań, previously on loan at (Belgium) Charleroi)
19	MF	POL	Szymon Łyczko (from Stal Rzeszów)
33	GK	SRB	Zlatan Alomerović (from (Cyprus) AEK Larnaca)
37	MF	GER	Sebastian Kerk (from Arka Gdynia)
77	FW	POL	Paweł Kosmalski (from Śląsk Wrocław II)

Out:

No.	Pos.	Nation	Player
6	MF	POL	Tomasz Makowski (to Polonia Warsaw)
7	MF	POL	Sebastian Kowalczyk (to Polonia Warsaw)
12	GK	POL	Rafał Gikiewicz (free agent)
18	MF	POL	Adam Radwański (to Wisła Płock)
22	GK	POL	Adam Matysek (on loan to Górnik Łęczna)
27	MF	COL	Jesús Díaz (loan return to Raków Częstochowa)
35	DF	CRO	Luka Lučić (free agent)
—	GK	POL	Michał Matys (on loan to Podbeskidzie, previously on loan at Resovia)
—	DF	POL	Szymon Karasiński (on loan to ŁKS Łódź, previously on loan at Ruch Chorzów)
—	MF	POL	Krzysztof Kolanko (to Podbeskidzie, previously on loan)

=== Wisła Płock ===
In:

No.	Pos.	Nation	Player
3	DF	POL	Marcin Flis (from Pogoń Siedlce)
5	MF	POR	Sidnei Tavares (on loan from (England) Blackburn Rovers)
7	FW	POL	Olaf Kobacki (from (England) Sheffield Wednesday)
17	MF	POL	Adam Radwański (from Zagłębie Lubin)
18	MF	CRO	Jurica Pršir (from (Croatia) Gorica)
19	DF	KOS	Dion Gallapeni (from Widzew Łódź, previously on loan)
21	DF	SLO	Žan Rogelj (from (Belgium) Charleroi, previously on loan)
23	MF	POL	Patryk Kun (from Legia Warsaw)
34	DF	POR	Afonso Silva (from (Portugal) Felgueiras)
57	MF	NGR	Samuel Akere (on loan from Widzew Łódź, previously on loan at (Croatia) Osijek)
62	MF	POL	Michał Król (from Motor Lublin)

Out:

No.	Pos.	Nation	Player
1	GK	POL	Stanisław Pruszkowski (to Unia Skierniewice)
2	DF	SWE	Kevin Čustović (to (Croatia) Gorica)
5	DF	CRO	Marin Karamarko (to (Bosnia and Herzegovina) Željezničar)
9	FW	GRE	Giannis Niarchos (to (Czech Republic) Slovácko)
13	DF	FRA	Quentin Lecoeuche (to (Greece) Volos)
14	MF	POL	Dominik Kun (to Arka Gdynia)
17	MF	POR	Matchoi Djaló (loan return to (Turkey) İstanbul Başakşehir)
18	MF	POL	Dominik Sarapata (loan return to (Denmark) Copenhagen)
25	DF	MNE	Nemanja Mijušković (to Odra Opole)
27	FW	POL	Bartosz Borowski (on loan to Chojniczanka Chojnice)
30	MF	POL	Wiktor Nowak (loan return to Górnik Zabrze)
66	FW	GEQ	Iban Salvador (free agent)
84	DF	POR	Tomás Tavares (to (Portugal) Marítimo)
97	GK	POL	Oskar Klat (on loan to Olimpia Grudziądz)
—	MF	POL	Oskar Dari (on loan to Sokół Kleczew)
—	MF	POL	Maciej Famulak (to Chojniczanka Chojnice, previously on loan at Pogoń Siedlce)

=== Pogoń Szczecin ===
In:

No.	Pos.	Nation	Player
4	DF	ITA	Alessandro Pio Riccio (from (Italy) Sampdoria)
17	FW	CMR	Jean-Pierre Nsame (from Legia Warsaw)
20	DF	GER	Isaiah Eichie (free agent)
21	MF	MKD	Darko Churlinov (from (Turkey) Kocaelispor)
22	FW	ESP	Jordi Sánchez (from Wisła Kraków)
29	DF	BEL	Lukas Willen (from (Belgium) Zulte Waregem)
31	GK	GRE	Nikolaos Botis (from (Greece) Olympiacos)
41	DF	HUN	Attila Szalai (from (Germany) TSG Hoffenheim, previously on loan)
98	GK	POL	Kevin Dąbrowski (from (Slovakia) Košice)

Out:

No.	Pos.	Nation	Player
4	DF	BRA	Léo Borges (to (Czech Republic) Sigma Olomouc)
8	MF	NOR	Fredrik Ulvestad (to (Denmark) OB)
20	MF	POL	Igor Brzyski (to (Czech Republic) Sigma Olomouc)
22	DF	CRO	Danijel Lončar (to (Indonesia) Persib Bandung)
24	FW	POL	Karol Angielski (to (Cyprus) Nea Salamis Famagusta)
25	FW	DEN	Mads Agger (on loan to (Sweden) Häcken)
31	GK	POL	Krzysztof Kamiński (to Pogoń Grodzisk Mazowiecki)
32	DF	GRE	Leonardo Koutris (to (Slovenia) Celje)
61	MF	POL	Kacper Smoliński (to Podbeskidzie)
83	GK	POL	Axel Holewiński (to Lechia Gdańsk)
90	MF	ENG	Sam Greenwood (to (England) Bristol City)
91	GK	POL	Jakub Bochniarz (to Resovia)
—	DF	POR	Marian Huja (to (Romania) CFR Cluj, previously on loan)
—	MF	POL	Mateusz Bąk (to Kluczevia Stargard, previously on loan)

=== Radomiak Radom ===
In:

No.	Pos.	Nation	Player
3	DF	POL	Kryspin Szcześniak (on loan from Górnik Zabrze)
7	MF	SUR	Ché Nunnely (from (Greece) Kifisia)
11	FW	CIV	Fernand Gouré (from (Belgium) Westerlo)
18	MF	ANG	Manu (from (Portugal) Estrela da Amadora)
22	MF	GRE	Anastasios Donis (from (Greece) Aris)
23	MF	POL	Kacper Karasek (from Motor Lublin)
39	FW	BRA	Ruan Índio (on loan from (Brazil) Cruzeiro)
72	DF	POL	Filip Koperski (from Olimpia Grudziądz)
80	FW	BRA	Guilherme Luiz (on loan from (Turkey) Göztepe)
90	MF	STP	Ronaldo Afonso (from (Portugal) Paços de Ferreira)
97	DF	BRA	Conrado (from (Romania) Oțelul Galați)
99	GK	POL	Bartłomiej Gradecki (from Ruch Chorzów)

Out:

No.	Pos.	Nation	Player
3	DF	ENG	Josh Wilson-Esbrand (loan return to (England) Manchester City)
5	DF	FRA	Jérémy Blasco (on loan to (Spain) Ibiza)
7	MF	CPV	Vasco Lopes (to (Italy) Südtirol)
9	FW	BRA	Leândro Rossi (retired)
19	MF	GUI	Salifou Soumah (loan return to (Sweden) Malmö)
20	DF	BRA	João Pedro (to (South Korea) Gwangju)
25	FW	BRA	Maurides (to (Georgia (country)) Dinamo Batumi)
28	MF	POL	Michał Kaput (to ŁKS Łódź)
75	GK	POL	Michał Jerke (on loan to Olimpia Grudziądz)

=== Korona Kielce ===
In:

No.	Pos.	Nation	Player
2	DF	POL	Ariel Mosór (from Raków Częstochowa)
18	MF	CZE	Patrik Hellebrand (from Górnik Zabrze)
19	MF	POL	Michael Ameyaw (from Raków Częstochowa)
22	FW	GER	Morgan Faßbender (from Bruk-Bet Termalica)
30	FW	COL	Camilo Mena (on loan from Lechia Gdańsk)
32	MF	CZE	Ondřej Lingr (from (United States) Houston Dynamo)
35	MF	POL	Kamil Jakubczyk (from Arka Gdynia)
67	DF	POL	Norbert Barczak (from Górnik Zabrze, previously on loan at Puszcza Niepołomice)

Out:

No.	Pos.	Nation	Player
5	DF	ESP	Pau Resta (to GKS Katowice)
11	FW	BUL	Vladimir Nikolov (to (Bulgaria) Slavia Sofia)
15	DF	POL	Nikodem Niski (to Pogoń Grodzisk Mazowiecki)
17	FW	POL	Mateusz Głowiński (on loan to Znicz Pruszków)
22	GK	POL	Michał Niedbała (on loan to Wiślanie Skawina)
26	DF	BUL	Viktor Popov (to (Bulgaria) Arda Kardzhali)
27	MF	POL	Wojciech Kamiński (free agent)
70	FW	ESP	Antoñín (on loan to (Spain) Hércules)
77	MF	POL	Marcin Cebula (to Stal Mielec)
88	MF	SLO	Tamar Svetlin (to (France) Saint-Étienne)
—	MF	POL	Jakub Kowalski (on loan to Arka Gdynia, previously on loan at Stal Mielec)
—	MF	POL	Adam Chojecki (on loan to Resovia, previously on loan at Podhale Nowy Targ)
—	DF	POL	Jakub Budnicki (to Polonia Warsaw, previously on loan)

=== Motor Lublin ===
In:

No.	Pos.	Nation	Player
4	DF	CRO	Tin Plavotić (from Austria Wien)
6	MF	POL	Mateusz Łęgowski (from (Turkey) Eyüpspor)
9	MF	POR	Rony Lopes (from (Portugal) Tondela)
17	DF	POL	Kamil Lukoszek (on loan from Górnik Zabrze)
18	DF	POL	Bartosz Bereszyński (from (Italy) Palermo)
27	MF	COM	Yacine Bourhane (from (Cyprus) Aris Limassol)
47	MF	SEN	Alioune Oumar Tall (from (Senegal) Guédiawaye, previously on loan at (Georgia (country)) Dila Gori)
70	MF	FRA	Makan Aïko (from (Portugal) Tondela)
71	GK	ROU	Mihai Popa (from (Romania) CFR Cluj)
77	FW	POL	Mateusz Posmyk (from Górnik Zabrze II)
90	FW	POL	Dominik Gregorski (from Zagłębie Lubin II)

Out:

No.	Pos.	Nation	Player
1	GK	CRO	Ivan Brkić (to Legia Warsaw)
3	DF	BEL	Hervé Matthys (to (Sweden) AIK)
6	MF	ESP	Sergi Samper (to (Hungary) Debrecen)
8	MF	FRA	Mathieu Scalet (to Odra Opole)
10	MF	POL	Kacper Karasek (to Radomiak Radom)
13	DF	POL	Krystian Brzozowski (on loan to Zawisza Bydgoszcz)
16	MF	POL	Franciszek Lewandowski (on loan to Mławianka Mława)
17	DF	POL	Filip Wójcik (to Ruch Chorzów)
18	DF	POL	Arkadiusz Najemski (to Warta Poznań)
19	MF	NED	Bradly van Hoeven (to (Scotland) Livingston)
20	FW	POL	Kacper Plichta (on loan to GKS Tychy)
21	MF	POL	Jakub Łabojko (to Piast Gliwice)
26	MF	POL	Michał Król (to Wisła Płock)
28	DF	POL	Paweł Stolarski (to Orzeł Ryczów)
42	DF	POL	Bright Ede (to (Spain) Deportivo A Coruña)
68	MF	POL	Bartosz Wolski (to GKS Katowice)
77	FW	AZE	Renat Dadaşov (free agent)
—	MF	POL	Kacper Szymanek (reloan to Warta Poznań)

=== Cracovia ===
In:

No.	Pos.	Nation	Player
10	MF	POL	Filip Marchwiński (on loan from (Italy) Lecce)
11	FW	NOR	Lasse Nordås (on loan from (England) Luton Town, previously on loan at (Netherlands) Heerenveen)
22	DF	AUT	Dominik Baumgartner (from (Austria) Wolfsberger)
27	FW	ERI	Siem Eyob-Abraha (from (England) Sheffield United)
28	DF	BEL	Vincent Burlet (from (France) Lille, previously on loan at (France) Boulogne)
38	MF	WAL	Alex Marciniak (from (England) Arsenal)
47	MF	TUN	Sayfallah Ltaief (from (Netherlands) Twente, previously on loan at (Germany) Greuther Fürth)
90	FW	BEL	Mohamed Berte (from (Belgium) Dender)
91	GK	POL	Aleksander Bobek (free agent)

Out:

No.	Pos.	Nation	Player
10	MF	SUI	Maxime Dominguez (to (Portugal) Marítimo)
11	FW	ESP	Pau Sans (loan return to (Spain) Real Zaragoza)
21	DF	CRO	Boško Šutalo (loan return to (Belgium) Standard Liège)
27	GK	SVK	Henrich Ravas (on loan to Polonia Warsaw)
29	FW	CMR	Jean Batoum (on loan to (Hungary) Nyíregyháza Spartacus)
66	DF	POL	Oskar Wójcik (to (Germany) Werder Bremen)
91	GK	POL	Konrad Golonka (on loan to Busko-Zdrój)
99	FW	CGO	Gabriel Charpentier (to (Romania) Argeș Pitești)
—	MF	POL	Bartosz Biedrzycki (on loan to Odra Opole, previously on loan at Górnik Łęczna)

=== Widzew Łódź ===
In:

No.	Pos.	Nation	Player
5	MF	GRE	Giannis Papanikolaou (from (Turkey) Çaykur Rizespor)
19	FW	SUI	Darian Maleš (from (Switzerland) Young Boys)
28	FW	POL	Karol Świderski (from (Greece) Panathinaikos)
40	DF	ESP	Mario García (from (Spain) Racing Santander)
70	DF	BIH	Jusuf Gazibegović (on loan from (Germany) 1. FC Köln, previously on loan at (Austria) Sturm Graz)
79	FW	CRO	Stipe Biuk (from (Spain) Real Valladolid)
80	MF	POR	Dani Silva (on loan from (Denmark) Midtjylland, previously on loan at (Cyprus) Pafos)
90	FW	ROU	Ioan Vermeșan (on loan from (Italy) Hellas Verona)
98	FW	BRA	Paulinho Bóia (from (Portugal) Nacional)

Out:

No.	Pos.	Nation	Player
3	DF	SVK	Samuel Kozlovský (to (Slovakia) Slovan Bratislava)
5	DF	CYP	Stelios Andreou (on loan to (Portugal) Estoril)
9	FW	SUI	Andi Zeqiri (on loan to (Belgium) Standard Liège)
19	MF	POL	Bartłomiej Pawłowski (to Arka Gdynia)
22	FW	GHA	Osman Bukari (on loan to (Serbia) Red Star Belgrade)
43	MF	POL	Leon Madej (to Zagłębie Sosnowiec)
46	MF	POL	Kuba Nawrocki (on loan to Stal Stalowa Wola)
77	FW	ESP	Ángel Baena (to (Spain) Sabadell)
98	GK	POL	Maciej Kikolski (on loan to GKS Katowice)
—	GK	POL	Antoni Błocki (to Mławianka Mława)
—	MF	POL	Kamil Cybulski (reloan to Stal Mielec)
—	MF	NGR	Samuel Akere (on loan to Wisła Płock, previously on loan at (Croatia) Osijek)
—	MF	CRO	Tonio Teklić (on loan to (Turkey) Mardin 1969, previously on loan at (Croatia) Osijek)
—	DF	KOS	Dion Gallapeni (to Wisła Płock, previously on loan)
—	FW	SEN	Pape Meïssa Ba (to (France) Nancy, previously on loan at (France) Red Star)

=== Piast Gliwice ===
In:

No.	Pos.	Nation	Player
12	GK	POL	Marcel Mendes-Dudziński (from Legia Warsaw, previously on loan at Świt Szczecin)
19	FW	FRA	Samuel Ntamack (from (Spain) Huesca, previously on loan at (France) Amiens)
22	DF	CHI	Francisco Sierralta (on loan from (France) Auxerre)
27	MF	POL	Jakub Łabojko (from Motor Lublin)
75	GK	SLO	Domen Gril (from (Portugal) Académico Viseu)
91	FW	POL	Maciej Kucharski (from Śląsk Wrocław II)

Out:

No.	Pos.	Nation	Player
6	MF	POL	Michał Chrapek (to Ruch Chorzów)
9	FW	ESP	Adrián Dalmau (to (Indonesia) PSIM Yogyakarta)
20	MF	POL	Grzegorz Tomasiewicz (to Śląsk Wrocław)
22	DF	POL	Tomasz Mokwa (free agent)
27	MF	POL	Justin Daniel (to Źródło Krośnica)
29	DF	POL	Igor Drapiński (to (Turkey) Samsunspor)
30	GK	SVK	Dominik Holec (to (Indonesia) Garudayaksa)
33	GK	POL	Karol Szymański (free agent)
63	FW	BLR	German Barkovsky (loan return to Puszcza Niepołomice)
—	MF	JPN	Toya Nakajima (to (Japan) Roasso Kumamoto)

=== Wisła Kraków ===
In:

No.	Pos.	Nation	Player
1	GK	POL	Marcel Łubik (on loan from (Germany) FC Augsburg, previously on loan at Górnik Zabrze)
13	DF	FRA	Maxence Maisonneuve (from (Belgium) La Louvière)
21	FW	SUI	Jérémy Guillemenot (from (Switzerland) Servette)
23	MF	ESP	Víctor Meseguer (from (Spain) Real Valladolid)
27	FW	FRA	Élie Youan (from (Scotland) Hibernian)

Out:

No.	Pos.	Nation	Player
1	GK	POL	Kamil Broda (free agent)
5	DF	SWE	Joseph Colley (to (Albania) Tirana)
11	FW	ALB	Ardit Nikaj (loan return to (Albania) Skënderbeu)
20	MF	AUT	Ervin Omić (on loan to (Romania) CFR Cluj)
30	DF	POL	Kuba Wiśniewski (to Świt Nowy Dwór Mazowiecki)
31	GK	BLR	Anton Chichkan (free agent)
56	MF	POL	Filip Baniowski (on loan to Podhale Nowy Targ)
57	FW	POL	Szymon Kawała (on loan to Sandecja Nowy Sącz)
80	MF	POL	Dawid Olejarka (to Olimpia Grudziądz)
99	FW	ESP	Jordi Sánchez (to Pogoń Szczecin)
—	MF	POL	Wiktor Staszak (on loan to Chrobry Głogów, previously on loan at (Italy) Lecce Primavera)

=== Śląsk Wrocław ===
In:

No.	Pos.	Nation	Player
1	GK	POL	Karol Niemczycki (from (Israel) Ashdod)
2	DF	POL	Dominik Szala (on loan from Górnik Zabrze, previously on loan at Stal Mielec)
3	DF	CYP	Irodotos Christodoulou (from (Cyprus) Krasava)
9	FW	CPV	Ieltsin Camões (on loan from (Norway) Tromsø, previously on loan at (Egypt) Al Ahly)
10	FW	FRA	Malaly Dembélé (from (Turkey) Sarıyer)
17	MF	POL	Karol Linetty (from (Turkey) Kocaelispor)
18	MF	POL	Karol Borys (from (Belgium) Westerlo, previously on loan at (Slovenia) Maribor)
20	MF	POL	Grzegorz Tomasiewicz (from Piast Gliwice)
21	FW	SWE	Alex Timossi Andersson (from (Sweden) Brommapojkarna)
27	DF	CRO	Jan Jurčec (from (Ukraine) Kryvbas Kryvyi Rih)
77	MF	ALB	Eniss Shabani (from (Croatia) Vukovar 1991)

Out:

No.	Pos.	Nation	Player
10	FW	SVK	Timotej Jambor (loan return to (Romania) Rapid București)
16	DF	POL	Krzysztof Kurowski (to (Netherlands) Twente)
17	MF	CZE	Petr Schwarz (retired)
18	MF	GER	Simon Schierack (to (Germany) Lokomotive Leipzig)
19	MF	POL	Maksymilian Dziuba (loan return to Lech Poznań II)
21	MF	POL	Michał Milewski (to Arka Gdynia)
22	MF	POL	Wiktor Niewiarowski (to Górnik Łęczna)
23	MF	POL	Krystian Rostek (to Ruch Chorzów)
24	MF	UKR	Yehor Sharabura (on loan to Chrobry Głogów)
26	MF	POL	Oskar Wojtczak (to GKS Tychy)
27	DF	POL	Michał Rosiak (to (Netherlands) Twente)
30	GK	POL	Bartosz Głogowski (on loan to Sandecja Nowy Sącz)
47	MF	POL	Antoni Klimek (loan return to Puszcza Niepołomice)
70	MF	POL	Miłosz Kozak (free agent)
—	DF	POL	Łukasz Gerstenstein (to Sandecja Nowy Sącz)

=== Wieczysta Kraków ===
In:

No.	Pos.	Nation	Player
8	MF	POL	Ben Lederman (from (Israel) Maccabi Tel Aviv)
9	FW	GRE	Efthymis Koulouris (from (Saudi Arabia) Al-Ula)
10	MF	NOR	Tobias Christensen (from (Romania) Rapid București)
16	DF	CRO	Antonio Milić (from Lech Poznań)
19	FW	ESP	José Antonio de la Rosa (from (Spain) Cádiz)
21	FW	POL	Bartosz Białek (from (Germany) Darmstadt 98)
24	DF	POL	Mateusz Wieteska (from (Italy) Cagliari, previously on loan at (Turkey) Kocaelispor)
26	GK	CRO	Nikola Čavlina (on loan from (Croatia) Dinamo Zagreb, previously on loan at (Italy) Como)
27	DF	SVK	Matúš Vojtko (from Lechia Gdańsk)
55	DF	CRO	Duje Dujmović (from (Bosnia and Herzegovina) Zrinjski Mostar)
77	GK	POL	Mateusz Kochalski (from (Azerbaijan) Qarabağ)
88	FW	SUI	Christopher Lungoyi (from (Turkey) Gaziantep)

Out:

No.	Pos.	Nation	Player
2	DF	POL	Michał Pazdan (free agent)
3	MF	POL	Jacek Góralski (retired)
5	DF	SWE	Elias Olsson (loan return to Lechia Gdańsk)
7	MF	POL	Maciej Gajos (free agent)
8	MF	POL	Tomasz Swędrowski (to Warta Sieradz)
9	FW	POR	Paulinho (on loan to (Portugal) Académico de Viseu)
10	MF	ESP	Goku Román (to Sandecja Nowy Sącz)
19	MF	POL	Michał Trąbka (to GKS Tychy)
27	FW	ESP	Carlitos (to (Spain) Intercity)
28	GK	POL	Kamil Soberka (loan return to Górnik Zabrze)
31	GK	POL	Kacper Gutowski (loan return to Lechia Gdańsk)
76	GK	POL	Antoni Kustra (to Świt Nowy Dwór Mazowiecki)
80	MF	POL	Natan Dzięgielewski (loan return to Górnik Zabrze)
89	DF	POL	Daniel Mikołajewski (to (Indonesia) Borneo)

== See also ==
- 2026–27 Ekstraklasa
