= 2025–26 Polish Cup =

STS Puchar Polski

Tournament details
- Country: Poland
- Dates: 5 August 2025 – 2 May 2026
- Teams: 70

Final positions
- Champions: Górnik Zabrze (7th title)
- Runners-up: Raków Częstochowa

Tournament statistics
- Matches played: 69
- Goals scored: 208 (3.01 per match)
- Top goal scorer(s): Jonatan Braut Brunes; Bartosz Nowak; Valērijs Šabala (5 goals each)

The 2025–26 Polish Cup (Polish: Puchar Polski [ˌpuxar ˈpɔlskʲi]) was the 72nd season of the annual Polish football knockout tournament. The competition began on 5 August 2025 with the preliminary round and ended on 2 May 2026 with the final match at the Stadion Narodowy in Warsaw. The Polish Cup is considered the second-most important club title in Polish football after the Ekstraklasa competition. The competition is organised by the Polish Football Association (PZPN). On 19 August 2025, PZPN announced that the Polish Cup would be sponsored by STS for next three seasons, making the official name STS Puchar Polski. Winners of the competition will qualify for 2026–27 UEFA Europa League third qualifying round.

The defending champions were Legia Warsaw were knocked out in the round of 32 by Pogoń Szczecin in a rematch of last year’s final. Górnik Zabrze defeated Raków Częstochowa 2–0 in the final to win their 7th cup title.

== Participating teams ==
Teams starting the competition from the round of 32	Teams starting the competition from the first round			Teams starting the competition from the preliminary round	
2025–26 UEFA club competitions 4 teams	2024–25 Ekstraklasa; 14 teams (teams not participating in 2025–26 UEFA club competitions)	2024–25 I liga 16 teams (from position 1–16)	Winners of 16 regional cup competitions 16 teams	2024–25 I liga 2 teams (from position 17–18)	2024–25 II liga 18 teams
Lech Poznań (quarter-finals); Raków Częstochowa (Runner-up); Jagiellonia Białystok (round of 16); Legia Warsaw (round of 32)	Pogoń Szczecin (round of 16); Cracovia (round of 32); Motor Lublin (first round); GKS Katowice (semi-finals); Górnik Zabrze (Champions); Piast Gliwice (round of 16); Korona Kielce (round of 16); Radomiak Radom (first round); Widzew Łódź (quarter-finals); Lechia Gdańsk (round of 16); Zagłębie Lubin (round of 32); Stal Mielec (first round); Śląsk Wrocław (round of 16); Puszcza Niepołomice (round of 32)	Arka Gdynia (round of 32); Bruk-Bet Termalica Nieciecza (first round); Wisła Płock (first round); Wisła Kraków (round of 16); Miedź Legnica (round of 32); Polonia Warsaw (first round); GKS Tychy (first round); Znicz Pruszków (round of 32); Górnik Łęczna (first round); Ruch Chorzów (first round); ŁKS Łódź (round of 32); Stal Rzeszów (first round); Chrobry Głogów (first round); Odra Opole (round of 32); Pogoń Siedlce (first round); Kotwica Kołobrzeg (first round)	Miedź Legnica II (dolnośląskie) (first round); Zawisza Bydgoszcz (kujawsko-pomorskie) (semi-finals); Avia Świdnik (lubelskie) (quarter-finals); Odra Bytom Odrzański (lubuskie) (first round); Lechia Tomaszów Mazowiecki (łódzkie) (first round); Beskid Andrychów (małopolskie) (first round); Legia Warsaw II (mazowieckie) (first round); Małapanew Ozimek (opolskie) (first round); Siarka Tarnobrzeg (podkarpackie) (first round); ŁKS Łomża (podlaskie) (first round); Gryf Słupsk (pomorskie) (round of 32); LKS Goczałkowice-Zdrój II (śląskie) (round of 32); Korona Kielce II (świętokrzyskie) (first round); GKS Wikielec (warmińsko-mazurskie) (round of 32); Polonia Środa Wielkopolska (wielkopolskie) (first round); Flota Świnoujście (zachodniopomorskie) (round of 32)	Warta Poznań (first round); Stal Stalowa Wola (first round)	Polonia Bytom (round of 16); Pogoń Grodzisk Mazowiecki (first round); Wieczysta Kraków (preliminary round); Chojniczanka Chojnice (quarter-finals); Świt Szczecin (round of 32); KKS 1925 Kalisz (preliminary round); Podbeskidzie Bielsko-Biała (first round); Hutnik Kraków (round of 32); Zagłębie Sosnowiec (preliminary round); Resovia Rzeszów (preliminary round); GKS Jastrzębie (first round); ŁKS Łódź II (preliminary round); Rekord Bielsko-Biała (preliminary round); Olimpia Grudziądz (round of 32); Wisła Puławy (preliminary round); Zagłębie Lubin II (preliminary round); Skra Częstochowa (preliminary round); Olimpia Elbląg (preliminary round)

== Prize money ==
The PZPN Board of Directors determined the size of the prizes.

Round reached	Amount
First round	regional cup winner: 50,000 PLN remainder teams: 15,000 PLN
Round of 32	45,000 PLN
Round of 16	90,000 PLN
Quarter-finals	190,000 PLN
Semi-finals	380,000 PLN
Final	1,000,000 PLN
Winner	5,000,000 PLN

== Round and draw dates ==
Round	Draw date	Number of teams	Date of matches	Teams entered for the competition
Preliminary round	None	70 → 60	5–6 August 2025	• 2024–25 I liga teams from positions 17–18, • 2024–25 II liga teams.
First round	19 August 2025	60 → 32	23–30 September 2025	• 2024–25 Ekstraklasa teams not participating in 2025–26 UEFA club competitions and top 16 2025–26 I liga teams, • 16 winners of the regional cups.
Round of 32	1 October 2025	32 → 16	28–30 October 2025	• 2024–25 Ekstraklasa teams participating in 2025–26 UEFA club competitions.
Round of 16	4 November 2025	16 → 8	2–4 December 2025	None
Quarter-finals	10 December 2025	8 → 4	3–5 March 2026	None
Semi-finals	6 March 2026	4 → 2	8–9 April 2026	None
Final	None	2	2 May 2026	None

== Preliminary round ==
The matches were played on 5–6 August 2025. Participating in this round were the 2 lowest ranked teams from 2024–25 I liga (which finished 2024–25 season on positions 17–18) and 18 teams from the 2024–25 II liga. With reference to the competition regulations, the matches were played according to the following scheme:

- 17th team of 2024–25 I liga season will be a host of match against 18th team of 2024–25 II liga season,
- 18th team of I liga season will be a host of match against 17th team of II liga season,
- 1st team of II liga season will be a host of match against 16th team of II liga season,
- 2nd team of II liga season will be a host of match against 15th team of II liga season,
- 3rd team of II liga season will be a host of match against 14th team of II liga season,
- 4th team of II liga season will be a host of match against 13th team of II liga season,
- 5th team of II liga season will be a host of match against 12th team of II liga season,
- 6th team of II liga season will be a host of match against 11th team of II liga season,
- 7th team of II liga season will be a host of match against 10th team of II liga season,
- 8th team of II liga season will be a host of match against 9th team of II liga season.

Number of teams per 2024–25 season tier still in competition
2024–25 Ekstraklasa	2024–25 I liga	2024–25 II liga	2024–25 Regional cup winners	Total
18 / 18	18 / 18	18 / 18	16 / 16	70 / 70

The number in brackets indicates the league level the club is entering in the 2025–26 season.

Team 1	Score	Team 2
Pogoń Grodzisk Mazowiecki (2)	3–0 (w/o)	Wisła Puławy (6)
5 August 2025
Stal Stalowa Wola (3)	3–1	Skra Częstochowa (4)
Polonia Bytom (2)	7–1	Zagłębie Lubin II (4)
Podbeskidzie Bielsko-Biała (3)	2–1	Resovia Rzeszów (3)
Hutnik Kraków (3)	3–0	Zagłębie Sosnowiec (3)
6 August 2025
Warta Poznań (3)	1–0	Olimpia Elbląg (4)
Wieczysta Kraków (2)	0–0 (a.e.t.) (5–6 p)	Olimpia Grudziądz (3)
Chojniczanka Chojnice (3)	2–1	Rekord Bielsko-Biała (3)
Świt Szczecin (3)	1–1 (a.e.t.) (6–5 p)	ŁKS Łódź II (3)
KKS 1925 Kalisz (3)	0–2	GKS Jastrzębie (3)

Pogoń Grodzisk Mazowiecki	3–0 (w/o)	Wisła Puławy
Note: Wisła Puławy has withdrawn from the competition.

5 August 2025	Hutnik Kraków	3–0	Zagłębie Sosnowiec	Kraków
16:30 CEST (UTC+02:00)	Śliwa 30'; Mortych 44'; Szablowski 78'	Report		Stadium: Suche Stawy Stadium; Attendance: 650; Referee: Sylwester Rasmus (Toruń)

5 August 2025	Polonia Bytom	7–1	Zagłębie Lubin II	Bytom
18:00 CEST (UTC+02:00)	Kwiatkowski 6', 62'; Sarmiento 38'; Arak 40'; Wojtyra 60'; Andrzejczak 66', 68'	Report	Gregorski 61'	Stadium: Polonia Bytom Stadium; Attendance: 654; Referee: Aleksander Kozieł (Kielce)

5 August 2025	Podbeskidzie Bielsko-Biała	2–1	Resovia Rzeszów	Bielsko-Biała
18:00 CEST (UTC+02:00)	Takáč 56'; Biernat 90'	Report	Romanowski 59'	Stadium: BBOSiR Stadium; Attendance: 1,204; Referee: Sebastian Krasny (Kraków)

5 August 2025	Stal Stalowa Wola	3–1	Skra Częstochowa	Stalowa Wola
19:38 CEST (UTC+02:00)	Łącki 47'; Tomalski 76'; Radecki 90'	Report	Kołodziejczyk 51'	Stadium: Subcarpathian Football Center; Attendance: 2,000; Referee: Mateusz Jenda (Warsaw)

6 August 2025	Wieczysta Kraków	0–0 (a.e.t.) (5–6 p)	Olimpia Grudziądz	Sosnowiec
16:00 CEST (UTC+02:00)		Report		Stadium: ArcelorMittal Park; Attendance: 345; Referee: Piotr Szypuła (Bielsko-Biała)
	Penalties
	Sandoval (penalty missed); Łysiak (penalty scored); Trąbka (penalty scored); Pestka (penalty scored); Semedo (penalty scored); Feliks (penalty scored); Mikołajewski (penalty missed)		(penalty scored) Frelek; (penalty scored) Mas; (penalty missed) Kaczmarek; (penalty scored) Tsyupa; (penalty scored) Sewerzyński; (penalty scored) Zbiciak; (penalty scored) Czajka

6 August 2025	Warta Poznań	1–0	Olimpia Elbląg	Środa Wielkopolska
16:30 CEST (UTC+02:00)	Waluś 80' (pen.)	Report		Stadium: Stadion Średzki; Attendance: 220; Referee: Mateusz Stępniak (Gdańsk)

6 August 2025	Świt Szczecin	1–1 (a.e.t.) (6–5 p)	ŁKS Łódź II	Szczecin
17:30 CEST (UTC+02:00)	Kapelusz 81'	Report	Popławski 69'	Stadium: Obiekt Sportowy Skolwin; Attendance: 385; Referee: Paweł Szuta (Poznań)
	Penalties
	Kort (penalty scored); Koziara (penalty scored); Wojdak (penalty scored); Nowak (penalty scored); Rogala (penalty scored); Góral (penalty scored)		(penalty scored) Ślęzak; (penalty scored) Grabowski; (penalty scored) Popławski; (penalty scored) Coulibaly; (penalty scored) Rozwandowicz; (penalty missed) Sokołowski

6 August 2025	KKS 1925 Kalisz	0–2	GKS Jastrzębie	Kalisz
17:30 CEST (UTC+02:00)		Report	Matysek 25', 56'	Stadium: Stadion Miejski; Attendance: 502; Referee: Błażej Syropiatko (Szczecin)

6 August 2025	Chojniczanka Chojnice	2–1	Rekord Bielsko-Biała	Chojnice
18:00 CEST (UTC+02:00)	Šabala 37' (pen.); Yukhymovych 40'	Report	Świderski 64'	Stadium: Stadion Miejski; Attendance: 997; Referee: Dawid Wiśniewski (Olsztyn)

== First round ==
The draw for this round was conducted in the headquarter of Telewizja Polska on 19 August 2025. The matches were played on 23–30 September 2025. Participating in this round were the 10 winners from the previous round, 14 teams from 2024–25 Ekstraklasa which were not qualified to 2025–26 UEFA club competitions, top 16 teams of 2024–25 I liga together with the 16 winners of the 2024–25 regional cup competitions. Games were hosted by teams playing in the lower division in the 2025–26 season or by first drawn team in a case of match between clubs from the same division.

Number of teams per 2024–25 season tier still in competition
2024–25 Ekstraklasa	2024–25 I liga	2024–25 II liga	2024–25 Regional cup winners	Total
18 / 18	18 / 18	8 / 18	16 / 16	60 / 70

Team 1	Score	Team 2
Kotwica Kołobrzeg (– (Note: MKP Kotwica qualified for the Polish Cup by virtue of its participation in the I liga in the previous season; in the following season the club was not registered at any league level. At the same time, MKS Kotwica appeared in the regional league, but it is a different legal entity, even though supporters refer to it as the continuation of the club’s traditions.))	0–3 (w/o)	Pogoń Szczecin (1)
23 September 2025
Gryf Słupsk (5)	1–0 (a.e.t.)	Polonia Warsaw (2)
Stal Rzeszów (2)	0–1	Korona Kielce (1)
Polonia Środa Wielkopolska (4)	1–3	Olimpia Grudziądz (3)
Miedź Legnica II (4)	1–3	Świt Szczecin (3)
LKS Goczałkowice Zdrój II (6)	3–1 (a.e.t.)	Stal Stalowa Wola (3)
Warta Poznań (3)	0–1	Polonia Bytom (2)
GKS Katowice (1)	4–2 (a.e.t.)	Wisła Płock (1)
Stal Mielec (2)	1–2	Puszcza Niepołomice (2)
24 September 2025
Siarka Tarnobrzeg (4)	0–1	Hutnik Kraków (3)
Miedź Legnica (2)	2–0	Pogoń Siedlce (2)
Flota Świnoujście (4)	2–2 (a.e.t.) (5–3 p)	GKS Jastrzębie (3)
ŁKS Łomża (4)	0–2	Odra Opole (2)
Legia Warsaw II (4)	0–3	Górnik Zabrze (1)
Małapanew Ozimek (5)	1–2 (a.e.t.)	Znicz Pruszków (2)
Górnik Łęczna (2)	1–5	Cracovia (1)
Korona Kielce II (4)	0–1	Piast Gliwice (1)
Pogoń Grodzisk Mazowiecki (2)	0–1	Lechia Gdańsk (1)
GKS Wikielec (4)	2–1	Podbeskidzie Bielsko-Biała (3)
Zawisza Bydgoszcz (4)	2–0	GKS Tychy (2)
Bruk-Bet Termalica Nieciecza (1)	2–2 (a.e.t.) (4–5 p)	Widzew Łódź (1)
Beskid Andrychów (5)	0–3	Chojniczanka Chojnice (3)
25 September 2025
Avia Świdnik (4)	3–1	Ruch Chorzów (2)
Odra Bytom Odrzański (5)	0–1	Wisła Kraków (2)
Arka Gdynia (1)	1–0 (a.e.t.)	Motor Lublin (1)
Radomiak Radom (1)	0–2 (a.e.t.)	Zagłębie Lubin (1)
ŁKS Łódź (2)	5–3 (a.e.t.)	Chrobry Głogów (2)
30 September 2025
Lechia Tomaszów Mazowiecki (4)	1–2	Śląsk Wrocław (2)

Kotwica Kołobrzeg	0–3 (w/o)	Pogoń Szczecin
Note: Kotwica Kołobrzeg has withdrawn from the competition. The withdrawal resulted from the club’s organizational and financial collapse after the previous season. The legal entity that had competed in the I liga ceased its activities and was not registered at any league level in the following season.

23 September 2025	LKS Goczałkowice-Zdrój II	3–1 (a.e.t.)	Stal Stalowa Wola	Goczałkowice-Zdrój
14:30 CEST (UTC+02:00)	Wuwer 44'; Fidziukiewicz 110'; Żagiel 120'	Report	Švec 30'	Stadium: Panattoni Arena; Attendance: 250; Referee: Szymon Łężny (Kluczbork)

23 September 2025	Miedź Legnica II	1–3	Świt Szczecin	Legnica
15:00 CEST (UTC+02:00)	Ciapa 68'	Report	Aftyka 52' (pen.); Kort 58', 70'	Stadium: Park Miejski; Attendance: 150; Referee: Maciej Węgrzyk (Rybnik)

23 September 2025	Stal Rzeszów	0–1	Korona Kielce	Rzeszów
17:30 CEST (UTC+02:00)		Report	Resta 64'	Stadium: Stadion Miejski; Attendance: 2,306; Referee: Patryk Gryckiewicz (Toruń)

23 September 2025	Warta Poznań	0–1	Polonia Bytom	Poznań
18:00 CEST (UTC+02:00)		Report	Wojtyra 34'	Stadium: Warta Poznań Stadium; Attendance: 620; Referee: Piotr Pazdecki (Koszalin)

23 September 2025	Stal Mielec	1–2	Puszcza Niepołomice	Mielec
18:00 CEST (UTC+02:00)	Niedźwiedź 12'	Report	Basse 39'; Korczakowski 66'	Stadium: Stadion Stali Mielec; Attendance: 1,071; Referee: Tomasz Marciniak (Płock)

23 September 2025	Gryf Słupsk	1–0 (a.e.t.)	Polonia Warsaw	Słupsk
19:00 CEST (UTC+02:00)	Piechowski 117'	Report		Stadium: Stadion Gryfa; Attendance: 720; Referee: Damian Krumplewski (Olsztyn)

23 September 2025	Polonia Środa Wielkopolska	1–3	Olimpia Grudziądz	Środa Wielkopolska
19:00 CEST (UTC+02:00)	Bartkowiak 7'	Report	Czajka 35'; Pawłowski 42'; Koperski 84'	Stadium: Stadion Średzki; Attendance: 692; Referee: Kajetan Kasprzyk (Legnica)

23 September 2025	GKS Katowice	4–2 (a.e.t.)	Wisła Płock	Katowice
20:30 CEST (UTC+02:00)	Shkurin 17'; Nowak 65', 91', 101'	Report	Lecoeuche 59'; Nowak 90'	Stadium: Arena Katowice; Attendance: 5,958; Referee: Damian Kos (Gdańsk)

24 September 2025	Legia Warsaw II	0–3	Górnik Zabrze	Książenice
12:30 CEST (UTC+02:00)		Report	Khlan 14'; Zahović 45'; Lukoszek 55'	Stadium: Legia Training Center; Attendance: 350; Referee: Albert Różycki (Łódź)

24 September 2025	Pogoń Grodzisk Mazowiecki	0–1	Lechia Gdańsk	Pruszków
15:15 CEST (UTC+02:00)		Report	Ćirković 53'	Stadium: Stadion MZOS; Attendance: 929; Referee: Jacek Małyszek (Lublin)

24 September 2025	Siarka Tarnobrzeg	0–1	Hutnik Kraków	Tarnobrzeg
15:30 CEST (UTC+02:00)		Report	Biś 62' (o.g.)	Stadium: Stadion Miejski; Attendance: 900; Referee: Mateusz Jenda (Warsaw)

24 September 2025	Małapanew Ozimek	1–2 (a.e.t.)	Znicz Pruszków	Ozimek
15:30 CEST (UTC+02:00)	Koval 56'	Report	Sokół 87'; Koprowski 100'	Stadium: Stadion Miejski; Attendance: 652; Referee: Paweł Szuta (Poznań)

24 September 2025	Korona Kielce II	0–1	Piast Gliwice	Kielce
15:30 CEST (UTC+02:00)		Report	Lokilo 61'	Stadium: Wojciech Szczepaniak Street Stadium; Attendance: 600; Referee: Patryk Świerczek (Brzesko)

24 September 2025	Beskid Andrychów	0–3	Chojniczanka Chojnice	Andrychów
15:30 CEST (UTC+02:00)		Report	Firlej 34'; Michalik 42'; Šabala 83'	Stadium: Stadion Miejski; Attendance: 620; Referee: Mateusz Mastaj (Rzeszów)

24 September 2025	Flota Świnoujście	2–2 (a.e.t.) (5–3 p)	GKS Jastrzębie	Świnoujście
16:30 CEST (UTC+02:00)	Kasperowicz 80'; Turski 105'	Report	Baranowicz 87' (pen.); Kąkolewski 94'	Stadium: Stadion Miejski; Attendance: 580; Referee: Mateusz Stępniak (Gdańsk)
	Penalties
	Paczuk (penalty scored); Stasiak (penalty scored); Krzysztofek (penalty scored); Turski (penalty scored); Chromiński (penalty scored)		(penalty scored) Mroczko; (penalty scored) Kriegler; (penalty scored) Baranowicz; (penalty missed) Gościniarek

24 September 2025	Górnik Łęczna	1–5	Cracovia	Łęczna
17:30 CEST (UTC+02:00)	Spáčil 89'	Report	Minchev 19', 37'; Maigaard 26'; Zahiroleslam 52'; Piła 55'	Stadium: Łęczna Stadium; Attendance: 1,381; Referee: Piotr Rzucidło (Warsaw)

24 September 2025	ŁKS Łomża	0–2	Odra Opole	Łomża
18:00 CEST (UTC+02:00)		Report	Nowak 8'; Szrek 14'	Stadium: Stadion Miejski; Attendance: 1,033; Referee: Karol Wójcik (Siedlce)

24 September 2025	GKS Wikielec	2–1	Podbeskidzie Bielsko-Biała	Wikielec
18:00 CEST (UTC+02:00)	Bajko 23'; Zieliński 51'	Report	Depka 83' (o.g.)	Stadium: Stadion Miejski; Attendance: 700; Referee: Maciej Pelka (Poznań)

24 September 2025	Zawisza Bydgoszcz	2–0	GKS Tychy	Bydgoszcz
18:00 CEST (UTC+02:00)	Kozłowski 75'; Wszołek 90'	Report		Stadium: Stadion Miejski im. Zdzisława Krzyszkowiaka; Attendance: 2,550; Referee: Paweł Wrzeszczyński (Kalisz)

24 September 2025	Miedź Legnica	2–0	Pogoń Siedlce	Legnica
18:30 CEST (UTC+02:00)	Mansfeld 8'; Antonik 50'	Report		Stadium: White Eagle Municipal Stadium; Attendance: 2,387; Referee: Tomasz Wajda (Żywiec)

24 September 2025	Bruk-Bet Termalica Nieciecza	2–2 (a.e.t.) (4–5 p)	Widzew Łódź	Nieciecza
21:00 CEST (UTC+02:00)	Trubeha 55'; Zapolnik 80'	Report	Álvarez 19'; Shehu 90'	Stadium: Stadion Sportowy Bruk-Bet Termalica; Attendance: 3,124; Referee: Karol Arys (Szczecin)
	Penalties
	Jiménez (penalty scored); Faßbender (penalty scored); Kubica (penalty missed); Ambrosiewicz (penalty scored); Zapolnik (penalty scored)		(penalty scored) Bergier; (penalty scored) Teklić; (penalty scored) Fornalczyk; (penalty scored) Therkildsen; (penalty scored) Shehu

25 September 2025	Avia Świdnik	3–1	Ruch Chorzów	Świdnik
14:00 CEST (UTC+02:00)	Kamiński 61'; Pisarek 74'; Małecki 90'	Report	Szwedzik 21'	Stadium: Stadion Miejski; Attendance: 1,350; Referee: Piotr Urban (Warsaw)

25 September 2025	Odra Bytom Odrzański	0–1	Wisła Kraków	Bytom Odrzański
14:30 CEST (UTC+02:00)		Report	Rodado 82'	Stadium: Stadion Miejski; Attendance: 2,054; Referee: Piotr Szypuła (Bielsko-Biała)

25 September 2025	Radomiak Radom	0–2 (a.e.t.)	Zagłębie Lubin	Radom
17:30 CEST (UTC+02:00)		Report	Reguła 105', 120'	Stadium: Stadion Miejski; Attendance: 4,311; Referee: Bartosz Frankowski (Toruń)

25 September 2025	ŁKS Łódź	5–3 (a.e.t.)	Chrobry Głogów	Łódź
19:00 CEST (UTC+02:00)	Krykun 13'; Lewandowski 24', 32'; Toma 114'; Löffelsend 120'	Report	Laskowski 20'; Janczukowicz 59' (pen.); Kozajda 62'	Stadium: Stadion Miejski; Attendance: 2,682; Referee: Sebastian Krasny (Kraków)

25 September 2025	Arka Gdynia	1–0 (a.e.t.)	Motor Lublin	Gdynia
20:30 CEST (UTC+02:00)	Jakubczyk 103'	Report		Stadium: Stadion Miejski; Attendance: 5,816; Referee: Marcin Szczerbowicz (Olsztyn)

30 September 2025	Lechia Tomaszów Mazowiecki	1–2	Śląsk Wrocław	Tomaszów Mazowiecki
18:00 CEST (UTC+02:00)	Chwałowski 34'	Report	Jezierski 2' (pen.); Dijakovic 21'	Stadium: Stadion Miejski; Attendance: 1,507; Referee: Rafał Szydełko (Rzeszów)

== Round of 32 ==
The draw for this round was conducted in the headquarter of Telewizja Polska on 1 October 2025. The matches were played on 28–30 October 2025. Participating in this round were the 28 winners from the previous round and 4 teams which were qualified to 2025–26 UEFA club competitions. Games were hosted by teams playing in a lower division in the 2025–26 season or by first drawn team in a case of match between clubs from the same division.

Number of teams per 2024–25 season tier still in competition
2024–25 Ekstraklasa	2024–25 I liga	2024–25 II liga	2024–25 Regional cup winners	Total
15 / 18	6 / 18	5 / 18	6 / 16	32 / 70

Team 1	Score	Team 2
28 October 2025
ŁKS Łódź (2)	1–2	GKS Katowice (1)
Zawisza Bydgoszcz (4)	3–0	GKS Wikielec (4)
LKS Goczałkowice Zdrój II (6)	0–7	Polonia Bytom (2)
Chojniczanka Chojnice (3)	3–1	Świt Szczecin (3)
Olimpia Grudziądz (3)	0–1	Śląsk Wrocław (2)
Znicz Pruszków (2)	0–3	Korona Kielce (1)
Odra Opole (2)	0–2	Piast Gliwice (1)
29 October 2025
Hutnik Kraków (3)	0–1	Wisła Kraków (2)
Raków Częstochowa (1)	3–0	Cracovia (1)
Avia Świdnik (4)	3–0	Flota Świnoujście (4)
Puszcza Niepołomice (2)	1–3 (a.e.t.)	Lechia Gdańsk (1)
Widzew Łódź (1)	1–0 (a.e.t.)	Zagłębie Lubin (1)
30 October 2025
Gryf Słupsk (5)	1–2	Lech Poznań (1)
Miedź Legnica (2)	2–3	Jagiellonia Białystok (1)
Arka Gdynia (1)	1–2	Górnik Zabrze (1)
Legia Warsaw (1)	1–2 (a.e.t.)	Pogoń Szczecin (1)

28 October 2025	LKS Goczałkowice Zdrój II	0–7	Polonia Bytom	Goczałkowice-Zdrój
11:45 CET (UTC+01:00)		90minut Łączy nas piłka	Gajda 7', 14'; Wróblewski 16' (o.g.); Terlecki 34'; Burkiewicz 61'; Stefański 80'; Wojtyra 87'	Stadium: Panattoni Arena; Attendance: 530; Referee: Paweł Horożaniecki (Żary)

28 October 2025	Olimpia Grudziądz	0–1	Śląsk Wrocław	Grudziądz
14:30 CET (UTC+01:00)		90minut Łączy nas piłka	Warchoł 79'	Stadium: Stadion Miejski; Attendance: 1,148; Referee: Karol Wójcik (Siedlce)

28 October 2025	ŁKS Łódź	1–2	GKS Katowice	Łódź
17:30 CET (UTC+01:00)	Jędrych 84' (o.g.)	90minut Łączy nas piłka	Jędrych 31' (pen.); Shkurin 61'	Stadium: Stadion Miejski; Attendance: 3,285; Referee: Marcin Szczerbowicz (Olsztyn)

28 October 2025	Zawisza Bydgoszcz	3–0	GKS Wikielec	Bydgoszcz
18:00 CET (UTC+01:00)	Bojas 58'; Staniak 75'; Kozłowski 78'	90minut Łączy nas piłka		Stadium: Stadion Miejski im. Zdzisława Krzyszkowiaka; Attendance: 1,152; Referee: Maciej Pelka (Poznań)

28 October 2025	Znicz Pruszków	0–3	Korona Kielce	Pruszków
18:00 CET (UTC+01:00)		90minut Łączy nas piłka	Rubežić 15', 47'; Nikolov 60' (pen.)	Stadium: Stadion Znicza Pruszków; Attendance: 610; Referee: Albert Różycki (Łódź)

28 October 2025	Chojniczanka Chojnice	3–1	Świt Szczecin	Chojnice
18:15 CET (UTC+01:00)	Šabala 37', 77' (pen.); Eizenchart 54'	90minut Łączy nas piłka	Kort 6'	Stadium: Stadion Miejski; Attendance: 621; Referee: Damian Krumplewski (Olsztyn)

28 October 2025	Odra Opole	0–2	Piast Gliwice	Opole
20:30 CET (UTC+01:00)		90minut Łączy nas piłka	Dalmau 29'; Cássio 59' (o.g.)	Stadium: Itaka Arena; Attendance: 4,048; Referee: Tomasz Kwiatkowski (Warsaw)

29 October 2025	Avia Świdnik	3–0	Flota Świnoujście	Świdnik
12:00 CET (UTC+01:00)	Pisarek 13'; Zuber 33'; Pigiel 43'	90minut Łączy nas piłka		Stadium: Stadion Miejski; Attendance: 835; Referee: Szymon Rutkowski (Bydgoszcz)

29 October 2025	Hutnik Kraków	0–1	Wisła Kraków	Kraków
13:00 CET (UTC+01:00)		90minut Łączy nas piłka	Duda 61'	Stadium: Suche Stawy Stadium; Attendance: 999; Referee: Mateusz Piszczelok (Katowice)

29 October 2025	Widzew Łódź	1–0 (a.e.t.)	Zagłębie Lubin	Łódź
17:30 CET (UTC+01:00)	Pawłowski 112'	90minut Łączy nas piłka		Stadium: Widzew Łódź Stadium; Attendance: 16,387; Referee: Jarosław Przybył (Kluczbork)

29 October 2025	Puszcza Niepołomice	1–3 (a.e.t.)	Lechia Gdańsk	Niepołomice
19:15 CET (UTC+01:00)	Simon 74'	90minut Łączy nas piłka	Dyachuk 64'; Bobček 115' (pen.); Ćirković 120'	Stadium: Stadion Miejski; Attendance: 1,053; Referee: Paweł Raczkowski (Warsaw)

29 October 2025	Raków Częstochowa	3–0	Cracovia	Częstochowa
20:30 CET (UTC+01:00)	Brunes 13', 40'; Diaby-Fadiga 81'	90minut Łączy nas piłka		Stadium: zondacrypto Arena; Attendance: 5,023; Referee: Łukasz Kuźma (Białystok)

30 October 2025	Gryf Słupsk	1–2	Lech Poznań	Słupsk
12:00 CET (UTC+01:00)	Wojda 54'	90minut Łączy nas piłka	Jagiełło 19'; Pereira 33'	Stadium: Stadion Gryfa; Attendance: 1,470; Referee: Mateusz Jenda (Warsaw)

30 October 2025	Miedź Legnica	2–3	Jagiellonia Białystok	Legnica
15:00 CET (UTC+01:00)	Pozo 36' (o.g.); Mansfeld 90'	90minut Łączy nas piłka	Polak 11'; Lozano 70', 75'	Stadium: White Eagle Municipal Stadium; Attendance: 2,812; Referee: Sebastian Krasny (Kraków)

30 October 2025	Arka Gdynia	1–2	Górnik Zabrze	Gdynia
18:00 CET (UTC+01:00)	Espiau 1'	90minut Łączy nas piłka	Ambros 33'; Szcześniak 88'	Stadium: Stadion Miejski; Attendance: 5,528; Referee: Damian Sylwestrzak (Wrocław)

30 October 2025	Legia Warsaw	1–2 (a.e.t.)	Pogoń Szczecin	Warsaw
21:00 CET (UTC+01:00)	Piątkowski 77'	90minut Łączy nas piłka	Grosicki 58'; Przyborek 117'	Stadium: Polish Army Stadium; Attendance: 18,741; Referee: Szymon Marciniak (Płock)

== Round of 16 ==
The draw for this round was conducted in the headquarter of Telewizja Polska on 4 November 2025. The matches were played on 2–4 December 2025. Participating in this round were the 16 winners from the previous round. Games were hosted by teams playing in a lower division in the 2025–26 season or by first drawn team in a case of match between clubs from the same division.

Number of teams per 2024–25 season tier still in competition
2024–25 Ekstraklasa	2024–25 I liga	2024–25 II liga	2024–25 Regional cup winners	Total
11 / 18	1 / 18	2 / 18	2 / 16	16 / 70

Team 1	Score	Team 2
2 December 2025
Pogoń Szczecin (1)	0–1	Widzew Łódź (1)
Lechia Gdańsk (1)	1–3	Górnik Zabrze (1)
3 December 2025
Piast Gliwice (1)	0–2	Lech Poznań (1)
Avia Świdnik (4)	4–2	Polonia Bytom (2)
Śląsk Wrocław (2)	1–2	Raków Częstochowa (1)
4 December 2025
Zawisza Bydgoszcz (4)	4–1	Wisła Kraków (2)
Chojniczanka Chojnice (3)	1–1 (a.e.t.) (4–3 p)	Korona Kielce (1)
GKS Katowice (1)	3–1	Jagiellonia Białystok (1)

2 December 2025	Lechia Gdańsk	1–3	Górnik Zabrze	Gdańsk
17:30 CET (UTC+01:00)	Kurminowski 39'	90minut Łączy nas piłka	Janicki 31'; Sow 33', 85'	Stadium: Polsat Plus Arena Gdańsk; Attendance: 6,502; Referee: Tomasz Kwiatkowski (Warsaw)

2 December 2025	Pogoń Szczecin	0–1	Widzew Łódź	Szczecin
20:30 CET (UTC+01:00)		90minut Łączy nas piłka	Zeqiri 35'	Stadium: Stadion Miejski im. Floriana Krygiera; Attendance: 16,924; Referee: Patryk Gryckiewicz (Toruń)

3 December 2025	Avia Świdnik	4–2	Polonia Bytom	Świdnik
12:00 CET (UTC+01:00)	Zuber 15'; Calavera 49' (o.g.); Uliczny 76' (pen.); Małecki 90+7'	90minut Łączy nas piłka	Michalski 6' (pen.); Matić 57'	Stadium: Stadion Miejski; Attendance: 1,428; Referee: Piotr Urban (Warsaw)

3 December 2025	Śląsk Wrocław	1–2	Raków Częstochowa	Wrocław
17:30 CET (UTC+01:00)	Warchoł 69'	90minut Łączy nas piłka	Brunes 43'; Makuch 74'	Stadium: Tarczyński Arena Wrocław; Attendance: 12,103; Referee: Paweł Raczkowski (Warsaw)

3 December 2025	Piast Gliwice	0–2	Lech Poznań	Gliwice
20:30 CET (UTC+01:00)		90minut Łączy nas piłka	Ishak 44'; Agnero 69'	Stadium: Stadion Miejski im. Piotra Wieczorka; Attendance: 3,511; Referee: Szymon Marciniak (Płock)

4 December 2025	Chojniczanka Chojnice	1–1 (a.e.t.) (4–3 p)	Korona Kielce	Chojnice
14:00 CET (UTC+01:00)	Yukhymovych 90+8'	90minut Łączy nas piłka	Svetlin 65'	Stadium: Stadion Miejski; Attendance: 1,676; Referee: Bartosz Frankowski (Toruń)
	Penalties
	Šabala (penalty scored); Firlej (penalty scored); Yukhymovych (penalty scored); Guilherme (penalty scored)		(penalty scored) Cebula; (penalty scored) Strzeboński; (penalty missed) Kamiński; (penalty scored) Niski; (penalty missed) Matuszewski

4 December 2025	GKS Katowice	3–1	Jagiellonia Białystok	Katowice
17:00 CET (UTC+01:00)	Nowak 45+1', 90+5'; Shkurin 51'	90minut Łączy nas piłka	Pululu 86' (pen.)	Stadium: Arena Katowice; Attendance: 6,076; Referee: Wojciech Myć (Lublin)

4 December 2025	Zawisza Bydgoszcz	4–1	Wisła Kraków	Bydgoszcz
20:45 CET (UTC+01:00)	Kona 32' (pen.), 64'; Staniak 53'; Duarte 60' (o.g.)	90minut Łączy nas piłka	Nikaj 25'	Stadium: Stadion Miejski im. Zdzisława Krzyszkowiaka; Attendance: 9,800; Referee: Damian Kos (Gdańsk)

== Quarter-finals ==
The draw for this round was conducted on 10 December 2025 in the headquarter of Telewizja Polska. The matches were played on 3–5 March 2026. Participating in this round were the 8 winners from the previous round. Games were hosted by teams playing in a lower division in the 2025–26 season or by first drawn team in a case of match between clubs from the same division.

Number of teams per 2024–25 season tier still in competition
2024–25 Ekstraklasa	2024–25 I liga	2024–25 II liga	2024–25 Regional cup winners	Total
5 / 18	0 / 18	1 / 18	2 / 16	8 / 70

Team 1	Score	Team 2
3 March 2026
GKS Katowice (1)	1–1 (a.e.t.) (4–2 p)	Widzew Łódź (1)
4 March 2026
Zawisza Bydgoszcz (4)	1–1 (a.e.t.) (5–4 p)	Chojniczanka Chojnice (3)
Lech Poznań (1)	0–1	Górnik Zabrze (1)
5 March 2026
Avia Świdnik (4)	1–2 (a.e.t.)	Raków Częstochowa (1)

3 March 2026	GKS Katowice	1–1 (a.e.t.) (4–2 p)	Widzew Łódź	Katowice
20:45 CET (UTC+01:00)	Klemenz 28'	90minut Łączy nas piłka	Zeqiri 53'	Stadium: Arena Katowice; Attendance: 7,945; Referee: Wojciech Myć (Lublin)
	Penalties
	Jędrych (penalty scored); Nowak (penalty scored); Rasak (penalty scored); Milewski (penalty scored)		(penalty missed) Álvarez; (penalty scored) Kornvig; (penalty scored) Cheng; (penalty missed) Fornalczyk

4 March 2026	Zawisza Bydgoszcz	1–1 (a.e.t.) (5–4 p)	Chojniczanka Chojnice	Bydgoszcz
17:30 CET (UTC+01:00)	Kozłowski 31'	90minut Łączy nas piłka	Šabala 64'	Stadium: Stadion Miejski im. Zdzisława Krzyszkowiaka; Attendance: 12,000; Referee: Sebastian Krasny (Kraków)
	Penalties
	Szumilas (penalty scored); Cywiński (penalty scored); Kona (penalty scored); Bojas (penalty scored); Golak (penalty scored)		(penalty scored) Šabala; (penalty scored) Yukhymovych; (penalty missed) Żywicki; (penalty scored) Bąkowicz; (penalty scored) Oleksiewicz

4 March 2026	Lech Poznań	0–1	Górnik Zabrze	Poznań
20:30 CET (UTC+01:00)		90minut Łączy nas piłka	Sadílek 41'	Stadium: Enea Stadion; Attendance: 13,577; Referee: Tomasz Kwiatkowski (Warsaw)

5 March 2026	Avia Świdnik	1–2 (a.e.t.)	Raków Częstochowa	Świdnik
13:30 CET (UTC+01:00)	Zawadzki 90+3'	90minut Łączy nas piłka	Brunes 45+5'; Mosór 92'	Stadium: Stadion Miejski; Attendance: 2,660; Referee: Paweł Malec (Łódź)

== Semi-finals ==
The draw for this round was conducted on 6 March 2026 in the headquarter of Telewizja Polska. The matches were played on 8–9 April 2026. Participating in this round were the 4 winners from the previous round. Games were hosted by teams playing in a lower division in the 2025–26 season or by first drawn team in a case of match between clubs from the same division.

Number of teams per 2024–25 season tier still in competition
2024–25 Ekstraklasa	2024–25 I liga	2024–25 II liga	2024–25 Regional cup winners	Total
3 / 18	0 / 18	0 / 18	1 / 16	4 / 70

Team 1	Score	Team 2
8 April 2026
Zawisza Bydgoszcz (4)	0–1	Górnik Zabrze (1)
9 April 2026
Raków Częstochowa (1)	4–4 (a.e.t.) (4–2 p)	GKS Katowice (1)

8 April 2026	Zawisza Bydgoszcz	0–1	Górnik Zabrze	Bydgoszcz
18:00 CEST (UTC+02:00)		90minut Łączy nas piłka	Ikia Dimi 32'	Stadium: Stadion Miejski im. Zdzisława Krzyszkowiaka; Attendance: 20,000; Referee: Damian Sylwestrzak (Wrocław)

9 April 2026	Raków Częstochowa	4–4 (a.e.t.) (4–2 p)	GKS Katowice	Częstochowa
18:30 CEST (UTC+02:00)	Brunes 47'; Racovițan 49'; Diaby-Fadiga 67'; Czerwiński 112' (o.g.)	90minut Łączy nas piłka	Jirka 21'; Jędrych 41' (pen.); Zreľák 90'; Markovic 116'	Stadium: zondacrypto Arena; Attendance: 5,500; Referee: Karol Arys (Szczecin)
	Penalties
	Rocha (penalty scored); Diaby-Fadiga (penalty scored); Struski (penalty scored); Racovițan (penalty scored)		(penalty scored) Jędrych; (penalty scored) Nowak; (penalty missed) Jirka; (penalty missed) Milewski

== Final ==
2 May 2026
16:00 CEST (UTC+02:00)

Górnik Zabrze	2–0	Raków Częstochowa
Massimo 32'; Khlan 65'	90minut Łączy nas piłka

Stadion Narodowy, Warsaw
Attendance: 50,072
Referee: Jarosław Przybył (Kluczbork)
