= 2024–25 Górnik Zabrze season =

Górnik Zabrze
2024–25 season
- Manager: Jan Urban
- Stadium: Arena Zabrze
- Ekstraklasa: 9th
- Polish Cup: First Round
- Average home league attendance: 17,129
- Biggest defeat: Lech Poznań 2–0 Górnik Zabrze
Home colours	Away colours	Third colours

The 2024–25 season is the 76th season in the history of Górnik Zabrze, and the club's eighth consecutive season in Ekstraklasa. In addition to the domestic league, the team is scheduled to participate in the Polish Cup.

== Transfers ==
=== Transfers in ===
Date	Pos.	Player	Transferred from	Fee	Ref.
1 July 2024	MF	Lukáš Ambros (CZE)	VfL Wolfsburg (GER)	Undisclosed	
1 July 2024	MF	Patrik Hellebrand (CZE)	Dynamo České Budějovice (CZE)	Free	
1 July 2024	DF	Manu Sánchez (ESP)	CD Castellón (ESP)	Undisclosed	
1 July 2024	DF	Josema (ESP)	Ruch Chorzów	Free	
1 July 2024	GK	Filip Majchrowicz (POL)	Radomiak Radom	Free	
1 July 2024	FW	Luka Zahović (SVK)	Pogoń Szczecin	Free	
17 July 2024	MF	Taofeek Ismaheel (FRA)	Lorient (FRA)	Undisclosed	
14 January 2025	MF	Sondre Liseth (NOR)	FK Haugesund (NOR)	Free	
22 January 2025	FW	Abbati Abdullahi (NGA)	Sporting Supreme FC (NGA)	Free	
5 February 2025	FW	Ousmane Sow (SEN)	Lierse S.K. (BEL)	€300,000	

=== Loans in ===
Date	Pos.	Player	Transferred from	Duration	Ref.
6 February 2025	DF	Matúš Kmeť (SVK)	Minnesota United (USA)	Until end of season	
8 February 2025	MF	Filip Prebsl (CZE)	Slavia Prague (CZE)	Until end of season	

=== Transfers out ===
Date	Pos.	Player	Transferred to	Fee	Ref.
1 July 2024	MF	Dani Pacheco (ESP)		End of contract	
1 July 2024	DF	Konstantinos Triantafyllopoulos (GRE)	Asteras Tripolis (GRE)	Contract termination	
1 July 2024	GK	Daniel Bielica (POL)	NAC Breda (NED)	End of contract	
1 July 2024	FW	Sebastian Musiolik (POL)	Śląsk Wrocław	End of contract	
1 July 2024	DF	Boris Sekulić (SVK)	Karmiotissa FC (CYP)	End of contract	
18 July 2024	MF	Lawrence Ennali (GER)	Houston Dynamo (USA)	€2,750,000	
28 January 2025	MF	Norbert Wojtuszek (POL)	Jagiellonia Białystok	€450,000	

=== Loans out ===
Date	Pos.	Player	Transferred to	Duration	Ref.
29 June 2024	FW	Jan Ciućka (POL)	Rekord Bielsko-Biała	Until end of season	

== Friendlies ==
=== Pre-season ===
29 June 2024 Friendly	Górnik Zabrze	2–1	Odra Opole	Zabrze
11:00	Ennali 41'; Olkowski 44'		1'	Stadium: Stadion im. Ernesta Pohla

2 July 2024 Friendly	WSG Tirol	1–1	Górnik Zabrze	Wattens, Austria
17:00	Skrbo 5'		Krawczyk 52'	Stadium: Gernot Langes Stadion

6 July 2024 Friendly	Górnik Zabrze	v	Panathinaikos	Austria
17:30

6 July 2024 Friendly	FC Basel	2–1	Górnik Zabrze	Jenbach, Austria
15:00	Fink 53'; Kololli 88'		Lukoszek 55'	Stadium: Stadion Jenbach

9 July 2024 Friendly	Karlsruher SC	0–3	Górnik Zabrze	Neukirchen am Großvenediger, Austria
16:00			Krawczyk 36'; Zahović 48' (pen.); Buksa 79'	Stadium: Sportplatz Neukirchen

13 July 2024 Friendly	Górnik Zabrze	1–0	Košice	Zabrze
11:00	Kozuki 1'	Report		Stadium: Arena Zabrze

3 August 2024 Friendly	Górnik Zabrze	3–1	GKS Tychy	Zabrze
11:00		Report		Stadium: boczne boisko Górnika
Note: Two periods of 35 minutes

=== In-season ===
6 September 2024 Friendly	Górnik Zabrze (Poland)	4–2	(Poland) Puszcza Niepołomice	Zabrze
11:00 CET	Olkowski 18'; Zahović 65'; Hellebrand 82'; Aleksander Tobolik 90'	Report	Mroziński 37'; Walski 43'	Stadium: Arena Zabrze

10 October 2024 Friendly	1. FC Köln (Germany)	3–5	(Poland) Górnik Zabrze	Köln
20:45 CET		Report		Stadium: RheinEnergieStadion

18 January 2025 Friendly	Górnik Zabrze (Poland)	5–2	(Serbia) IMT	Belek, Turkey
15:00 EET	Dominik Sarapata 28'; Podolski 66'; Josema 77'; Wojtuszek 84'; Ismaheel 90+2'	Report	Bonnet 58'; Miloš Jović 70'	Stadium: Regnum Carya Golf & Spa Resort - Field 1

21 January 2025 Friendly	Górnik Zabrze (Poland)	1–2	(Hungary) Paks	Belek, Turkey
	Bakış 62' (pen.)	Report	Könyves 35'; B. Tóth 76'

24 January 2025 Friendly	Górnik Zabrze (Poland)	1–1	(Ukraine) Veres Rivne	Belek, Turkey
	Zahović 45'	Report	Dominik Szala 49' (o.g.)

== Competitions ==
=== Ekstraklasa ===
==== League table ====
Pos	Team	Pld	W	D	L	GF	GA	GD	Pts
7	Motor Lublin	34	14	7	13	48	59	−11	49 (Note: Ranked based on head-to-head points: Motor Lublin 4 pts, GKS Katowice - 1 pt.)
8	GKS Katowice	34	14	7	13	49	47	+2	49
9	Górnik Zabrze	34	13	8	13	43	39	+4	47
10	Piast Gliwice	34	11	12	11	37	36	+1	45 (Note: Ranked based on head-to-head points: Piast Gliwice 4 pts, Korona Kielce - 1 pt.)
11	Korona Kielce	34	11	12	11	37	45	−8	45

Source: ekstraklasa.org 90minut.pl
Rules for classification: 1) Points; 2) Head-to-head points; 3) Head-to-head goal difference; 4) Goal difference; 5) Goals scored; 6) Number of wins; 7) Number of away wins; 8) Lower number of points based on yellow and red cards (red card = 3 points, yellow card = 1 point, sending-off = 3 points - including 1 point for first yellow card); 9) Fairplay ranking; 10) Draw.
(Note: Head-to-head record is used only after all the matches between the teams in question have been played)

==== Results by round ====
Round	1	2	3	4
Ground	A	A	H	A
Result	L	D	W	W
Position	14	13		

Updated to match(es) played on 9 August 2024. Source:
A = Away; H = Home; W = Win; D = Draw; L = Loss

==== Matches ====
21 July 2024 1	Lech Poznań	2–0	Górnik Zabrze	Poznań
17:30	Ishak 32' (pen.); Gholizadeh (yellow card) 85'; Hotić 90+4'		Janicki (yellow card) 45+2'; García (yellow card) 50'	Stadium: Poznań Stadium; Attendance: 19,620; Referee: Damian Sylwestrzak

26 July 2024 2	Puszcza Niepołomice	2–2	Górnik Zabrze	Kraków
18:00	Kosidis 52'; Serafin 60'		Sánchez 11'; Rasak 56'	Stadium: Józef Piłsudski Stadium; Referee: Daniel Stefański

2 August 2024 3	Górnik Zabrze	1–0	Pogoń Szczecin	Zabrze
20:30	Zahović 83'			Stadium: Ernst Pohl Stadium; Referee: Szymon Marciniak

9 August 2024 4	Radomiak Radom	1–2	Górnik Zabrze	Radom
18:00 UTC+2				Stadium: Czachor Brothers Stadium

18 August 2024 5	Górnik Zabrze	0–0	Raków Częstochowa	Zabrze
20:15 CEST	Janicki (yellow card) 90+3'; Wojtuszek (yellow card) 90+3'	Report	Pestka (yellow card) 34'; Tudor (yellow card) 45+1'; Berggren (yellow card) 90+4'	Stadium: Ernst Pohl Stadium; Attendance: 17,034; Referee: (Poland) Łukasz Kuźma

24 August 2024 6	Cracovia	3–2	Górnik Zabrze	Kraków
17:30 CEST	Filip Rózga 26'; Hasić 73'; Manu Sánchez 78' (o.g.); Kakabadze (yellow card) 88'	Report	Rasak 20'; Janža (yellow card) 29'; Ismaheel 32'; Janicki (red card) 57'; Szcześniak (red card) 84'	Stadium: Józef Piłsudski Cracovia Stadium; Attendance: 10,106; Referee: (Poland) Paweł Malec

1 September 2024 7	Górnik Zabrze	2–3	Lechia Gdańsk	Zabrze
12:15 CEST	Rasak (yellow card) 7'; Olkowski 53'; Ismaheel (yellow card) 56'; Filipe Nascimento 82'	Report	Tsarenko 24'; Olsson 28'; Vyunnyk 68'; Weirauch (yellow card) 77'; Kałahur (yellow card) 86'	Stadium: Ernst Pohl Stadium; Attendance: 21,148; Referee: (Poland) Karol Arys

13 September 2024 8	Motor Lublin	1–0	Górnik Zabrze	Lublin
18:00 CEST	Mbaye Ndiaye (yellow card) 43'; Simon 49'	Report	Wojtuszek (yellow card) 21'; Ambros (yellow card) 84'	Stadium: Motor Lublin Arena; Attendance: 12,497; Referee: (Poland) Patryk Gryckiewicz

21 September 2024 9	Górnik Zabrze	3–0	GKS Katowice	Zabrze
20:15 CEST	Podolski 4' 64'; Lukoszek (yellow card) 39'; Josema 48'	Report	Komor (yellow card) 90+2'	Stadium: Ernst Pohl Stadium; Attendance: 22,371; Referee: (Poland) Daniel Stefański

28 September 2024 10	Legia Warsaw	1–1	Górnik Zabrze	Warsaw
20:15 CEST	Pankov 35'; Luquinhas (yellow card) 60'	Report	Lukoszek 10' (pen.); Rasak (yellow card) 39'	Stadium: Polish Army Stadium; Attendance: 24,438; Referee: (Poland) Łukasz Kuźma

=== Polish Cup ===
25 September 2024 1	Górnik Zabrze	0-1 (a.e.t.)	Radomiak Radom	Zabrze
20:30 CEST		Report	Alves 93'	Stadium: Ernst Pohl Stadium; Attendance: 8,741; Referee: (Poland) Marcin Kochanek
