= Christopher Simon =

Christopher Simon may refer to:

- Christopher Simon (actor), Australian actor
- Christopher Simon (footballer), Senegalese footballer

== See also ==
- Christopher Simon Sykes, British photographer
