= Marcel Łubik =

Polish footballer

Personal information
- Date of birth: 19 May 2004 (age 22)
- Place of birth: Nowogard, Poland
- Height: 1.90 m (6 ft 3 in)
- Position: Goalkeeper

Team information
- Current team: Wisła Kraków (on loan from FC Augsburg)
- Number: 1

Youth career
- –2018: TSV Königsbrunn
- 2018–2022: FC Augsburg

Senior career*
Years	Team	Apps	(Gls)
2022–	FC Augsburg II	47	(0)
2024–2025	→ GKS Tychy (loan)	34	(0)
2025–2026	→ Górnik Zabrze (loan)	33	(0)
2026–	→ Wisła Kraków (loan)	14	(0)

International career^{‡}
2025–	Poland U21	8	(0)
- * Club domestic league appearances and goals as of 14:50, 10 November 2026 (UTC) ‡ National team caps and goals as of 21:30, 13 November 2026 (UTC)

Marcel Łubik (born 19 May 2004) is a Polish professional footballer who plays as a goalkeeper for Ekstraklasa club Wisła Kraków, on loan from Bundesliga club FC Augsburg.

== Early life ==
Łubik was born in Nowogard, Poland, to a Turkish father, but moved to Germany aged four.

== Club career ==
He played youth football for TSV Königsbrunn, before joining FC Augsburg's academy in 2018. Across the 2022–23 and 2023–24 seasons, he made 47 appearances for FC Augsburg II in the Regionalliga Bayern. In summer 2023, Łubik agreed a three-year long professional contract with Augsburg, and the following summer, he joined Polish I liga club GKS Tychy on a season-long loan. He made 34 I liga appearances for GKS Tychy across the 2024–25 season.

In June 2025, he extended his contract, which was due to expire in summer 2026, to summer 2028 and joined Ekstraklasa club Górnik Zabrze on a season-long loan.

On 21 June 2026, Łubik prolonged his contract with Augsburg until 2029 and moved to another Ekstraklasa club Wisła Kraków on loan for the rest of the season.

== International career ==
Łubik is eligible to represent Germany, Poland and Turkey internationally. He told Polish sports media outlet TVP Sport in October 2025 that his first preference was to represent Poland. He has played for Poland internationally at under-21 level, having made his debut for that team in October 2025.

== Career statistics ==
As of match played 6 November 2026

Appearances and goals by club, season and competition
Club	Season	League			National cup (Note: Includes Polish Cup)		Continental		Other		Total	
Club	Season	Division	Apps	Goals	Apps	Goals	Apps	Goals	Apps	Goals	Apps	Goals
FC Augsburg II	2022–23	Regionalliga Bayern	18	0	—		—		—		18	0
FC Augsburg II	2023–24	Regionalliga Bayern	29	0	—		—		—		29	0
FC Augsburg II	Total		47	0	—		—		—		47	0
GKS Tychy (loan)	2024–25	I liga	34	0	0	0	—		—		34	0
Górnik Zabrze (loan)	2025–26	Ekstraklasa	33	0	3	0	—		—		36	0
Wisła Kraków (loan)	2026–27	Ekstraklasa	14	0	0	0	—		—		14	0
Career total			128	0	3	0	0	0	0	0	131	0

== Honours ==
Górnik Zabrze

- Polish Cup: 2025–26
