= Kryspin Szcześniak =

Polish footballer

Personal information
- Date of birth: 8 January 2001 (age 25)
- Place of birth: Gorzów Wielkopolski, Poland
- Height: 1.86 m (6 ft 1 in)
- Position: Defender

Team information
- Current team: Radomiak Radom (on loan from Górnik Zabrze)
- Number: 3

Youth career
- Stilon Gorzów Wielkopolski
- 2011–2012: Impuls Wawrów
- 2013–2014: Stilon Gorzów Wielkopolski
- 2014–2019: Pogoń Szczecin

Senior career*
Years	Team	Apps	(Gls)
2019–2022	Pogoń Szczecin II	21	(0)
2020–2023	Pogoń Szczecin	0	(0)
2020–2021	→ GKS Jastrzębie (loan)	26	(0)
2021–2022	→ Górnik Łęczna (loan)	25	(0)
2022–2023	→ Górnik Zabrze (loan)	14	(0)
2022–2023	→ Górnik Zabrze II (loan)	4	(0)
2023–	Górnik Zabrze	67	(2)
2024	Górnik Zabrze II	1	(0)
2026–	→ Radomiak Radom (loan)	10	(0)

International career
2021–2022	Poland U20	5	(0)
- * Club domestic league appearances and goals as of 21:27, 1 November 2026 (UTC)

Kryspin Szcześniak (born 8 January 2001) is a Polish professional footballer who plays as a defender for Ekstraklasa club Radomiak Radom, on loan from Górnik Zabrze.

== International career ==
Szcześniak represented Poland at the under-20 level, earning five caps between 2021 and 2022. He received his first call-up for the Poland national team in November 2025 for their 2026 FIFA World Cup qualifying matches against the Netherlands and Malta.

== Career statistics ==
As of match played 29 October 2026

Appearances and goals by club, season and competition
Club	Season	League			Polish Cup		Continental		Other		Total	
Club	Season	Division	Apps	Goals	Apps	Goals	Apps	Goals	Apps	Goals	Apps	Goals
Pogoń Szczecin II	2018–19	III liga, gr. II	4	0	—		—		—		4	0
Pogoń Szczecin II	2019–20	III liga, gr. II	14	0	—		—		—		14	0
Pogoń Szczecin II	2022–23	III liga, gr. II	3	0	0	0	—		—		3	0
Pogoń Szczecin II	Total		21	0	0	0	—		—		21	0
Pogoń Szczecin	2020–21	Ekstraklasa	0	0	0	0	—		—		0	0
Pogoń Szczecin	2021–22	Ekstraklasa	0	0	0	0	—		—		0	0
Pogoń Szczecin	Total		0	0	0	0	—		—		0	0
GKS Jastrzębie (loan)	2020–21	I liga	26	0	0	0	—		—		26	0
Górnik Łęczna (loan)	2021–22	Ekstraklasa	25	0	4	0	—		—		29	0
Górnik Zabrze (loan)	2022–23	Ekstraklasa	14	0	1	0	—		—		15	0
Górnik Zabrze II (loan)	2022–23	III liga, gr. III	4	0	—		—		—		4	0
Górnik Zabrze	2023–24	Ekstraklasa	25	1	3	0	—		—		28	1
Górnik Zabrze	2024–25	Ekstraklasa	26	1	1	0	—		—		27	1
Górnik Zabrze	2025–26	Ekstraklasa	16	0	4	1	—		—		20	1
Górnik Zabrze	Total		67	2	8	1	—		—		75	3
Górnik Zabrze II	2024–25	III liga, gr. III	1	0	—		—		—		1	0
Radomiak Radom (loan)	2026–27	Ekstraklasa	10	0	2	0	—		—		12	0
Career total			168	2	15	1	0	0	0	0	183	3

== Honours ==
Górnik Zabrze

- Polish Cup: 2025–26
