= 2026–27 Radomiak Radom season =

Radomiak Radom
2026–27 season
- Manager: Tomasz Kaczmarek
- Stadium: Stadion im. Braci Czachorów
- Ekstraklasa: Pre-season
- Polish Cup: Pre-season
Home colours	Away colours	Third colours

The 2026–27 season is the 117th season in the history of RKS Radomiak Radom and their sixth consecutive season in the Ekstraklasa. The club will also participate in the Polish Cup.

== Transfers ==
=== In ===
Pos.	Player	Transferred to	Fee	Date	Source
FW	(Ivory Coast) Fernand Gouré	(Belgium) Westerlo	Free	1 July 2026	
FW	(Poland) Kacper Karasek	(Poland) Motor Lublin	Free	1 July 2026	
FW	(Angola) Manu	(Portugal) CF Estrela Amadora U23	Undisclosed	1 July 2026	
DF	(Brazil) Conrado	(Romania) Oțelul Galați	Undisclosed	7 July 2026	
MF	(Poland) Filip Koperski	(Poland) Olimpia Grudziądz	Undisclosed	9 July 2026	
MF	(Suriname) Ché Nunnely	(Greece) AE Kifisia	Free	14 July 2026	

=== Out ===
Pos.	Player	Transferred to	Fee	Date	Source
FW	(Guinea) Salifou Soumah	(Sweden) Malmö FF	Loan return	30 June 2026	
DF	(England) Josh Wilson-Esbrand	(England) Manchester City	Loan return	30 June 2026	
MF	(Brazil) Leândro Rossi	Retiring		1 July 2026	
FW	(Brazil) Maurides	(Georgia (country)) Dinamo Batumi	Free	5 July 2026	

== Pre-season and friendlies ==
27 June 2026 Friendly	Górnik Łęczna (Poland)	v	(Poland) Radomiak Radom
10:00

1 July 2026 Friendly	Radomiak Radom (Poland)	2–3	(Israel) Hapoel Be'er Sheva
12:30	Camará 30'; Ouattara 35'		44'; 66'; 89' (pen.)

4 July 2026 Friendly	ŁKS Łódź (Poland)	2–1	(Poland) Radomiak Radom
14:00	Olejniczak 1'; Piasecki 10'		Manu 80'

10 July 2026 Friendly	Radomiak Radom (Poland)	2–4	(Ukraine) Dynamo Kyiv
12:30	Blasco 36'; Markiewicz 77'		56'; 41' (pen.), 51', 59'

14 July 2026 Friendly	Legia Warsaw (Poland)	3–1	(Poland) Radomiak Radom
12:00	54'; 67'; 75'		Alves 11' (pen.)

18 July 2026 Friendly	Radomiak Radom (Poland)	1–2	(Poland) Pogoń Siedlce
12:00

25 July 2026 Friendly	Radomiak Radom (Poland)	2–3	(Cyprus) Nea Salamis Famagusta
12:30

== Competitions ==
=== Ekstraklasa ===
Pos	Team	Pld	W	D	L	GF	GA	GD	Pts	Qualification or relegation
1	Górnik Zabrze	1	1	0	0	2	1	+1	3	Qualification for the Champions League play-off round
2	Radomiak Radom	1	1	0	0	2	1	+1	3	Qualification for the Champions League second qualifying round
3	Legia Warsaw	1	1	0	0	1	0	+1	3	Qualification for the Europa League second qualifying round
4	Jagiellonia Białystok	1	1	0	0	1	0	+1	3	Qualification for the Conference League second qualifying round
5	Cracovia	1	0	1	0	0	0	0	1	

First match(es) will be played: 24 July 2026. Source: ekstraklasa.org 90minut.pl
Rules for classification: 1) Points; 2) Head-to-head points; 3) Head-to-head goal difference; 4) Goal difference; 5) Goals scored; 6) Number of wins; 7) Number of away wins; 8) Lower number of points based on yellow and red cards (red card = 3 points, yellow card = 1 point, sending-off = 3 points - including 1 point for first yellow card); 9) Fairplay ranking; 10) Draw.
(Note: Head-to-head record is used only after all the matches between the teams in question have been played)

==== Matches ====
24 July 2026 1	Radomiak Radom	v	Wieczysta Kraków	Radom
18:00				Stadium: Stadion im. Braci Czachorów
