= Filip Kozłowski =

Polish footballer

Personal information
- Date of birth: 11 July 1995 (age 31)
- Place of birth: Inowrocław, Poland
- Height: 1.85 m (6 ft 1 in)
- Position: Striker

Team information
- Current team: Zawisza Bydgoszcz
- Number: 9

Youth career
- –2011: Gopło Kruszwica

Senior career*
Years	Team	Apps	(Gls)
2011–2014	Gopło Kruszwica		
2014–2017	Pogoń Szczecin	5	(0)
2014	Pogoń Szczecin II	4	(1)
2015–2016	→ Rozwój Katowice (loan)	46	(6)
2016	→ Chojniczanka Chojnice (loan)	7	(0)
2017	Rozwój Katowice	9	(2)
2017–2020	Elana Toruń	86	(35)
2020–2022	GKS Katowice	64	(13)
2022–2023	Skra Częstochowa	28	(3)
2023–2025	Kotwica Kołobrzeg	66	(9)
2025–	Zawisza Bydgoszcz	32	(13)
- * Club domestic league appearances and goals as of 22:07, 1 June 2026 (UTC)

Filip Kozłowski (born 11 July 1995) is a Polish professional footballer who plays as a striker for II liga club Zawisza Bydgoszcz.

== Club career ==
On 5 August 2020, Kozłowski joined GKS Katowice.

== Career statistics ==
As of match played 30 May 2026

Appearances and goals by club, season and competition
Club	Season	League			Polish Cup		Europe		Other		Total	
Club	Season	Division	Apps	Goals	Apps	Goals	Apps	Goals	Apps	Goals	Apps	Goals
Pogoń Szczecin	2013–14	Ekstraklasa	3	0	—		—		—		3	0
Pogoń Szczecin	2014–15	Ekstraklasa	2	0	1	0	—		—		3	0
Pogoń Szczecin	Total		5	0	1	0	—		—		6	0
Pogoń Szczecin II	2014–15	III liga, gr. D	4	1	—		—		—		4	1
Rozwój Katowice (loan)	2014–15	II liga	15	3	—		—		—		15	3
Rozwój Katowice (loan)	2015–16	I liga	31	3	2	1	—		—		33	4
Rozwój Katowice (loan)	Total		46	6	2	1	—		—		48	7
Chojniczanka Chojnice (loan)	2016–17	I liga	7	0	2	0	—		—		9	0
Rozwój Katowice	2016–17	II liga	9	2	—		—		—		9	2
Elana Toruń	2017–18	III liga, gr. II	31	13	—		—		—		31	13
Elana Toruń	2018–19	II liga	31	14	1	0	—		—		32	14
Elana Toruń	2019–20	II liga	24	8	1	1	—		—		25	9
Elana Toruń	Total		86	35	2	1	—		—		88	36
GKS Katowice	2020–21	II liga	34	12	1	0	—		—		35	12
GKS Katowice	2021–22	I liga	30	1	2	1	—		—		32	2
GKS Katowice	Total		64	13	3	1	—		—		67	14
Skra Częstochowa	2022–23	I liga	28	3	0	0	—		—		28	3
Kotwica Kołobrzeg	2023–24	II liga	33	6	2	1	—		—		35	7
Kotwica Kołobrzeg	2024–25	I liga	33	3	2	0	—		—		35	3
Kotwica Kołobrzeg	Total		66	9	4	1	—		—		70	10
Zawisza Bydgoszcz	2025–26	III liga, gr II	32	13	5	3	—		—		37	16
Career total			347	82	19	7	0	0	0	0	366	89

== Honours ==
Elana Toruń

- III liga, group II: 2017–18
- Polish Cup (Kuyavia-Pomerania regionals): 2017–18

Zawisza Bydgoszcz

- III liga, group II: 2025–26
