= Dmytro Yukhymovych =

Ukrainian footballer

Personal information
- Full name: Dmytro Oleksandrovych Yukhymovych
- Date of birth: 27 July 1996 (age 30)
- Place of birth: Starokostiantyniv, Ukraine
- Height: 1.86 m (6 ft 1 in)
- Position: Centre-back

Team information
- Current team: Chojniczanka Chojnice
- Number: 3

Youth career
- 2010–2012: KOLIPS Kostopil
- 2012: Volyn Lutsk
- 2013: KOLIPS Kostopil

Senior career*
Years	Team	Apps	(Gls)
2013	Sluch Starokostiantyniv (amateur)	0	(0)
2014–2015	Podillya Khmelnytskyi (amateur)	26	(3)
2016–2022	Ahrobiznes Volochysk	151	(14)
2022	→ Znicz Pruszków (loan)	8	(0)
2022–2025	Znicz Pruszków	71	(2)
2025–	Chojniczanka Chojnice	34	(2)
- * Club domestic league appearances and goals as of 11:02, 31 May 2026 (UTC)

Dmytro Oleksandrovych Yukhymovych (Ukrainian: Дмитро Олександрович Юхимович; born 27 July 1996) is a Ukrainian professional footballer who plays as a centre-back for Polish club Chojniczanka Chojnice.
