= Norbert Wojtuszek =

Polish footballer

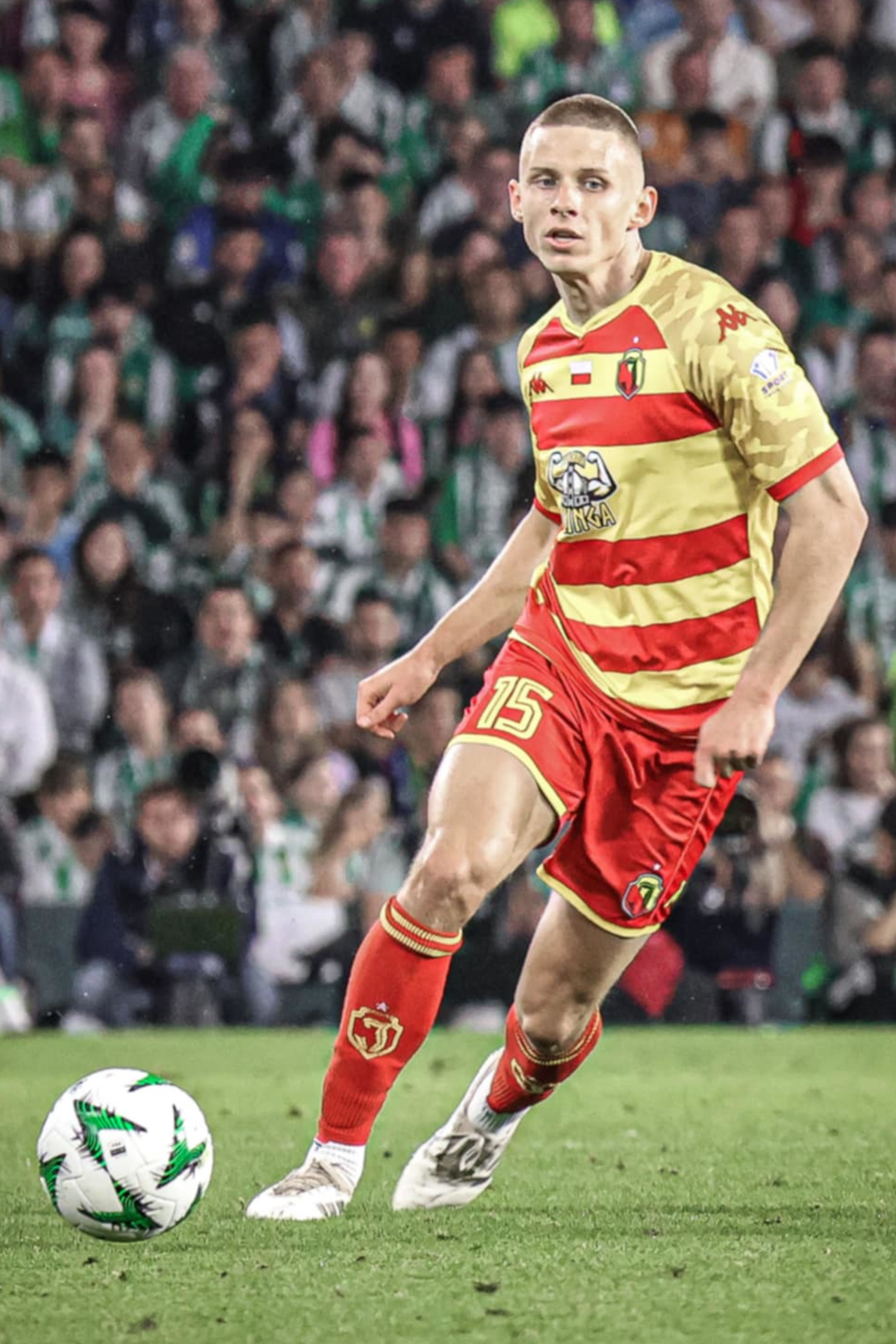
- Wojtuszek in 2025 with Jagiellonia Białystok

Personal information
- Full name: Norbert Wojtuszek
- Date of birth: 5 October 2001 (age 25)
- Place of birth: Kraków, Poland
- Height: 1.82 m (6 ft 0 in)
- Positions: Midfielder; right-back

Team information
- Current team: Jagiellonia Białystok
- Number: 15

Youth career
- 2011–2014: Krakus Nowa Huta
- 2014–2018: Progres Kraków
- 2018–2019: Cracovia

Senior career*
Years	Team	Apps	(Gls)
2019–2020	Pogoń Siedlce	14	(1)
2020–2025	Górnik Zabrze	58	(1)
2021–2022	Górnik Zabrze II	6	(0)
2023–2024	→ GKS Tychy (loan)	29	(0)
2025–	Jagiellonia Białystok	53	(3)

International career^{‡}
2026–	Poland	4	(0)
- * Club domestic league appearances and goals as of 18:54, 20 September 2026 (UTC) ‡ National team caps and goals as of 16:10, 6 October 2026 (UTC)

Norbert Wojtuszek (born 5 October 2001) is a Polish professional footballer who plays as a midfielder or right-back for Ekstraklasa club Jagiellonia Białystok and the Poland national team.

== Career ==
On 28 January 2025, Wojtuszek moved to Jagiellonia Białystok.

== Career statistics ==
=== International ===
As of match played 5 October 2026

Appearances and goals by national team and year
National team	Year	Apps	Goals
Poland	2026	4	0
Total		4	0

== Honours ==
Jagiellonia Białystok

- Polish Super Cup: 2024
