= Kamil Lukoszek =

Polish footballer (born 2002)

Personal information
- Date of birth: 4 April 2002 (age 24)
- Place of birth: Opole, Poland
- Height: 1.77 m (5 ft 10 in)
- Positions: Full-back; winger

Team information
- Current team: Motor Lublin (on loan from Górnik Zabrze)
- Number: 17

Youth career
- Oderka Opole
- 2012–2014: Odra Opole
- 2014–2016: MOSiR Opole
- 2016–2019: Górnik Zabrze

Senior career*
| Years | Team | Apps | (Gls) |
| 2019–2021 | Górnik Zabrze II | 34 | (6) |
| 2021–2023 | Skra Częstochowa | 49 | (2) |
| 2023– | Górnik Zabrze | 64 | (8) |
| 2023–2025 | Górnik Zabrze II | 2 | (0) |
| 2026– | → Motor Lublin (loan) | 6 | (1) |

International career
| 2018 | Poland U16 | 2 | (0) |
| 2018 | Poland U17 | 2 | (0) |
| 2022 | Poland U20 | 1 | (0) |
| 2023–2024 | Poland U21 | 6 | (0) |
- * Club domestic league appearances and goals as of 18:17, 12 September 2026 (UTC)

Kamil Lukoszek (born 4 April 2002) is a Polish professional footballer who plays as a full-back or winger for Ekstraklasa club Motor Lublin, on loan from Górnik Zabrze.

== Career ==
=== Youth career ===
He started in Oderka Opole, then he moved to Odra Opole in 2012. In 2014, he joined MOSiR Opole. Two years later, he moved to Górnik Zabrze, which was the last transfer of his youth career.

=== Górnik Zabrze ===
His senior career started with Górnik Zabrze II. He debuted there on 29 May 2019, in a 7–0 victory over Lechia Dzierżoniów. He scored the first goal of his senior career on 19 September of the following year, in the 81st minute of a 4–0 home victory over Polonia Nysa. Across the 2020–21 season, he appeared in 27 matches and scored six goals.

=== Skra Częstochowa ===
On 24 July 2021, Lukoszek moved to I liga side Skra Częstochowa on a two-year deal. After being assigned squad number 15, he made his first appearance on 8 August 2021 in a 3–2 away loss against ŁKS Łódź, coming off the bench in the 83rd minute, replacing Dawid Niedbała. His debut in a starting lineup came on 20 October in a 0–1 away loss against Odra Opole. On 19 February 2023, he scored his first I liga goal in the 61st minute of 1–2 away loss against ŁKS Łódź.

=== Return to Górnik Zabrze ===
On 5 July 2023, his return to Górnik was announced. He was transferred there on one-year deal with a provision in his contract allowing it to be extended until June 2025. After being assigned with squad number 17, he made his official first team debut for Górnik on 23 July in a 0–2 away loss against Radomiak Radom. On 27 August, he was given a red card during a 1–4 away loss to Jagiellonia Białystok, but the penalty was revoked by Polish Football Association three days later. He scored his first goal for his new team on 27 September 2023 in a 4–0 Polish Cup victory over GKS Katowice. On 29 March 2024, his contract was extended for a further year. During a 2–0 victory over Śląsk Wrocław on 14 April 2024, he scored the first career double. On 21 December 2024, Lukoszek extended his deal with the club until June 2028.

==== Loan to Motor Lublin ====
On 4 August 2026, Lukoszek joined another Ekstraklasa club Motor Lublin on a season-long loan with an option to buy.

== International career ==
He has played for the Poland under-16, under-19 and under-21 teams.

== Career statistics ==
As of match played 16 May 2026

Appearances and goals by club, season and competition
| Club | Season | League | | | Polish Cup | | Europe | | Other | | Total | |
| Club | Season | Division | Apps | Goals | Apps | Goals | Apps | Goals | Apps | Goals | Apps | Goals |
|---|---|---|---|---|---|---|---|---|---|---|---|---|
| Górnik Zabrze II | 2018–19 | III liga, gr. III | 3 | 0 | — | | — | | — | | 3 | 0 |
| Górnik Zabrze II | 2019–20 | III liga, gr. III | 4 | 0 | — | | — | | — | | 4 | 0 |
| Górnik Zabrze II | 2020–21 | III liga, gr. III | 27 | 6 | — | | — | | — | | 27 | 6 |
| Górnik Zabrze II | Total | | 34 | 6 | — | | — | | — | | 34 | 6 |
| Skra Częstochowa | 2021–22 | I liga | 23 | 0 | 1 | 0 | — | | — | | 24 | 0 |
| Skra Częstochowa | 2022–23 | I liga | 26 | 2 | 0 | 0 | — | | — | | 26 | 2 |
| Skra Częstochowa | Total | | 49 | 2 | 1 | 0 | — | | — | | 50 | 2 |
| Górnik Zabrze | 2023–24 | Ekstraklasa | 26 | 3 | 3 | 1 | — | | — | | 29 | 4 |
| Górnik Zabrze | 2024–25 | Ekstraklasa | 20 | 4 | 1 | 0 | — | | — | | 21 | 4 |
| Górnik Zabrze | 2025–26 | Ekstraklasa | 18 | 1 | 4 | 1 | — | | — | | 22 | 2 |
| Górnik Zabrze | Total | | 64 | 8 | 8 | 2 | — | | — | | 72 | 10 |
| Górnik Zabrze II | 2023–24 | III liga, gr. III | 1 | 0 | — | | — | | — | | 1 | 0 |
| Górnik Zabrze II | 2025–26 | III liga, gr. III | 1 | 0 | — | | — | | — | | 1 | 0 |
| Górnik Zabrze II | Total | | 2 | 0 | — | | — | | — | | 2 | 0 |
| Career total | | | 149 | 16 | 9 | 2 | 0 | 0 | 0 | 0 | 158 | 18 |

== Honours ==
Górnik Zabrze II

- Polish Cup (Zabrze regionals): 2020–21

Górnik Zabrze

- Polish Cup: 2025–26

Individual

- Ekstraklasa Young Player of the Month: April 2024
