= Franciszek Lewandowski =

Polish footballer (born 2008)

Personal information
- Date of birth: 23 May 2008 (age 18)
- Position: Midfielder

Team information
- Current team: Mławianka Mława (on loan from Motor Lublin)

Youth career
- 2017–2023: Champion Warsaw

Senior career*
Years	Team	Apps	(Gls)
2023–2025	Champion Warsaw	37	(1)
2025–	Motor Lublin	2	(0)
2026–	→ Mławianka Mława (loan)	0	(0)
- * Club domestic league appearances and goals as of 21:33, 29 May 2026 (UTC)

Franciszek Lewandowski (born 23 May 2008) is a Polish professional footballer who plays as a midfielder for III liga club Mławianka Mława, on loan from Motor Lublin.

== Club career ==
On 13 January 2025, he moved to Ekstraklasa side Motor Lublin from regional league club Champion Warsaw on a three-year deal after joining Motor's training camp in Turkey.

On 4 September 2026, Lewandowski was sent on a season-long loan to III liga club Mławianka Mława.
