= Wojciech Kamiński (footballer) =

Polish footballer

Personal information
- Date of birth: 21 January 2001 (age 25)
- Place of birth: Gliwice, Poland
- Height: 1.86 m (6 ft 1 in)
- Position: Midfielder

Youth career
- 2012–2019: Piast Gliwice

Senior career*
Years	Team	Apps	(Gls)
2019–2023	Piast Gliwice	0	(0)
2019–2020	→ Bruk-Bet Termalica (loan)	12	(0)
2020	→ Sandecja (loan)	6	(0)
2021	→ Wigry Suwałki (loan)	20	(1)
2021–2022	→ Zagłębie Sosnowiec (loan)	27	(0)
2023–2024	Odra Opole	37	(2)
2024–2026	Korona Kielce	23	(0)
2024–2026	Korona Kielce II	18	(0)

International career
2021	Poland U20	1	(0)
- * Club domestic league appearances and goals as of 21:29, 29 May 2026 (UTC)

Wojciech Kamiński (born 21 January 2001) is a Polish professional footballer who plays as a midfielder.

== Career statistics ==
As of match played 22 May 2026

Appearances and goals by club, season and competition
Club	Season	League			Polish Cup		Continental		Other		Total	
Club	Season	Division	Apps	Goals	Apps	Goals	Apps	Goals	Apps	Goals	Apps	Goals
Bruk-Bet Termalica (loan)	2019–20	I liga	12	0	1	0	—		—		13	0
Sandecja (loan)	2020–21	I liga	6	0	1	0	—		—		7	0
Wigry Suwałki (loan)	2020–21	II liga	20	1	0	0	—		—		20	1
Zagłębie Sosnowiec (loan)	2021–22	I liga	27	0	2	0	—		—		29	0
Odra Opole	2022–23	I liga	16	1	—		—		—		16	1
Odra Opole	2023–24	I liga	21	1	1	0	—		—		22	1
Odra Opole	Total		37	2	1	0	—		—		94	2
Korona Kielce	2024–25	Ekstraklasa	13	0	2	0	—		—		15	0
Korona Kielce	2025–26	Ekstraklasa	10	0	2	0	—		—		12	0
Korona Kielce	Total		23	0	4	0	—		—		27	0
Korona Kielce II	2024–25	III liga, gr. IV	10	0	—		—		—		10	0
Korona Kielce II	2025–26	III liga, gr. IV	8	0	0	0	—		—		8	0
Korona Kielce II	Total		18	0	0	0	—		—		18	0
Career total			143	3	9	0	0	0	0	0	152	3
