= Christopher Simon (footballer) =

Senegalese footballer

- Simon in 2026 with Motor Lublin

Personal information
- Full name: Christopher Serge Simon
- Date of birth: 6 December 1999 (age 26)
- Place of birth: Dakar, Senegal
- Height: 1.85 m (6 ft 1 in)
- Position: Midfielder

Team information
- Current team: Motor Lublin
- Number: 8

Youth career
- –2023: Be Sport Academy

Senior career*
Years	Team	Apps	(Gls)
2022–2023	→ Casa Sports (loan)		
2023–2024	Génération Foot		
2024–	Motor Lublin	33	(4)
2025–2026	→ Puszcza Niepołomice (loan)	27	(2)
- * Club domestic league appearances and goals as of 00:37, 18 October 2026 (UTC)

Christopher Serge Simon (born 6 December 1999) is a Senegalese professional footballer who plays as a midfielder for Ekstraklasa club Motor Lublin.

== Career ==
=== Youth career ===
He spent his entire youth career in Be Sport Academy.

=== Motor Lublin ===
On 14 July 2024, he was transferred to Polish Ekstraklasa side Motor Lublin on a two-year deal with an option to prolong it until June 2027. Simon made his debut in Motor eleven days later, in 0–2 loss to Raków Częstochowa. During that match, he came off the bench in the 78th minute, replacing Mathieu Scalet. He scored his first goal for his new team on 13 September, in the 49th minute of a 1–0 victory over Górnik Zabrze.

==== Loan to Puszcza Niepołomice ====
On 21 August 2025, Simon joined I liga club Puszcza Niepołomice on loan for the remainder of the season. He scored three goals and provided one assist in 29 appearances across all competitions before returning to Motor at the end of the season.

== Honours ==
Génération Foot:

- Ligue 1: 2022–23
