= Motor Lublin =

- Full name: Motor Lublin Spółka Akcyjna
- Nicknames: Żółto-Biało-Niebiescy (Yellow, White and Blues), Motorowcy (The Motorians)
- Founded: December 1950; 75 years ago
- Ground: Arena Lublin
- Capacity: 15,247
- Chairman: Zbigniew Jakubas
- Manager: Mariusz Misiura
- League: Ekstraklasa
- 2025–26: Ekstraklasa, 12th of 18
- Website: motorlublin.eu
Home colours	Away colours

Motor Lublin (Polish pronunciation: [ˈmɔtɔr ˈlublin]) is a Polish professional football club based in Lublin, in the Lublin Voivodeship. Founded in December 1950, the club is historically associated with the Fabryka Samochodów Ciężarowych automotive plant and takes its nickname, Żółto-biało-niebiescy (The Yellow, White and Blues), from its official colours.

Motor currently compete in the Ekstraklasa, the top division of the Polish football league system, following successive promotions from the 2022–23 II liga and 2023–24 I liga, both secured via the play-offs. The club previously spent nine seasons in the top flight between 1980 and 1992, achieving a best finish of seventh in 1984–85.

Motor play home matches at the Arena Lublin, a 15,500-seat stadium opened in 2014. They maintain a long-standing rivalry with local side Lublinianka and have a notable following in eastern Poland.

== Historical names ==
(till 1950) Metalowiec
(since 1950) Stal FSC Lublin
(since 1957) Robotniczy Klub Sportowy Motor Lublin
(since 1998) Lubelski Klub Piłkarski
(since 2001) LKP Motor Lublin
(since 2010) Motor Lublin SA

== History ==
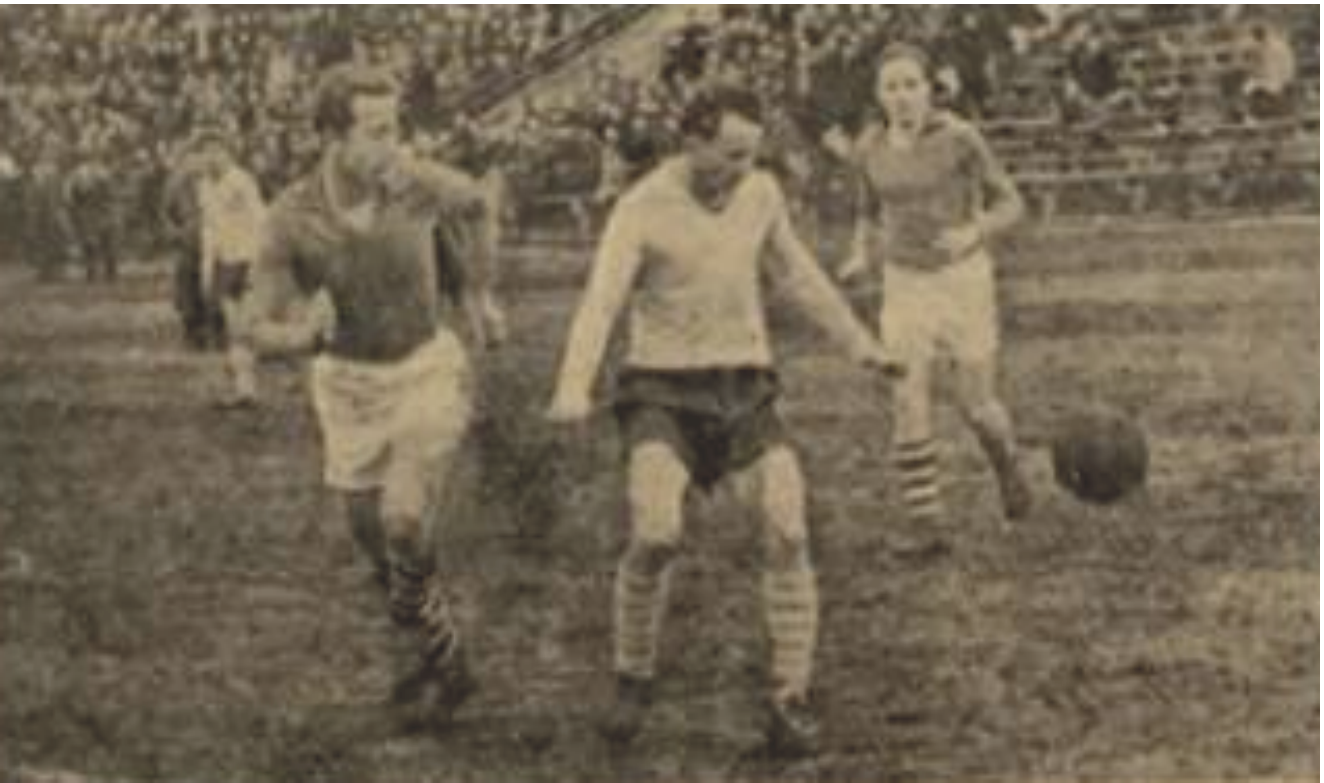
Lublin derby match between Motor Lublin and KS Lublinianka in 1960

The history of Motor Lublin dates back to December 1950, when a group of sports enthusiasts decided to form a football team, supported by FSC Lublin Automotive Factory. Motor was at first called Stal (Steel) Lublin, and its team began playing in the lower level of Polish football tier (also called Class B). After one year, the team won promotion to Class A, which was the equivalent of the 4th Division. In the spring of 1953, Stal FSC Lublin debuted in the third level, the so-called Lublin-Rzeszów Inter-Voivodeship Class (Lubelsko-Rzeszowska Klasa Miedzywojewodzka), but was relegated after one year.

Stal FSC returned to the third level in 1955, and in 1957, the club changed its name into Robotniczy Klub Sportowy (Workers' Sports Club) Motor. After the Polish league adopted an autumn–spring format, Motor missed promotion to the Second Division in August 1961, losing a play-off to Start Łódź. In 1964, Motor became the champion of the Lublin region, and in the playoffs, it beat Włókniarz Łódz, KS Warszawianka, Mazur Ełk and Warmia Olsztyn. They did not win promotion, as two of their games were voided - this was because one of Motor's players was not registered.

In the 1964–65 season, Motor once again won the local championships, qualifying for the playoffs. Since both Motor and CKS Czeladź finished in the first position in the playoff round, an additional game was necessary between the two teams. This game took place on 5 August 1965 in Łódź. Supported by 7,000 fans, Motor won 3–0, winning promotion to the second level of Polish football. Motor was relegated after one season, but in the early summer of 1968, they returned to the Second Division, where they remained until 1972.

Following the expansion of the Second Division to two groups in 1973, Motor gained promotion and maintained strong performances in the ensuing seasons. In 1979–80, under manager Bronisław Waligóra, they won promotion to the Ekstraklasa. The club finished 10th in 1980–81 but was relegated after the 1981–82 season. Motor participated in the 1982 Intertoto Cup, finishing third in their group after one win in six matches.

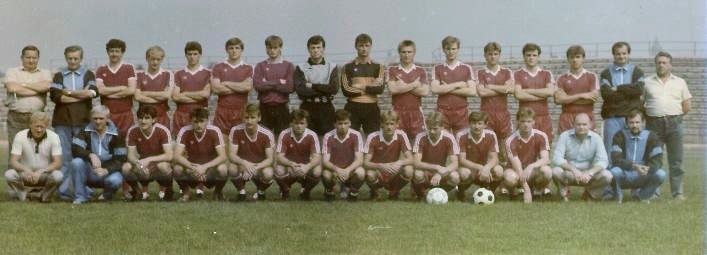
1989-90 Motor Lublin team

In 1982–83, managed by Lesław Ćmikiewicz, Motor contested promotion with Resovia Rzeszów. Their 4–0 victory over Resovia on 19 June 1983, witnessed by 30,000 at the stadium, secured a return to the top flight. They were relegated after the 1986–87 season but returned in August 1989 by defeating Pogoń Szczecin in a play-off. Motor remained in the Ekstraklasa for three seasons before relegation in 1991–92. The club was relegated twice more by 1998 to the fourth tier and temporarily rebranded as Lubelski Klub Pilkarski (LKP) to manage debts, reverting to Motor Lublin in 2001.

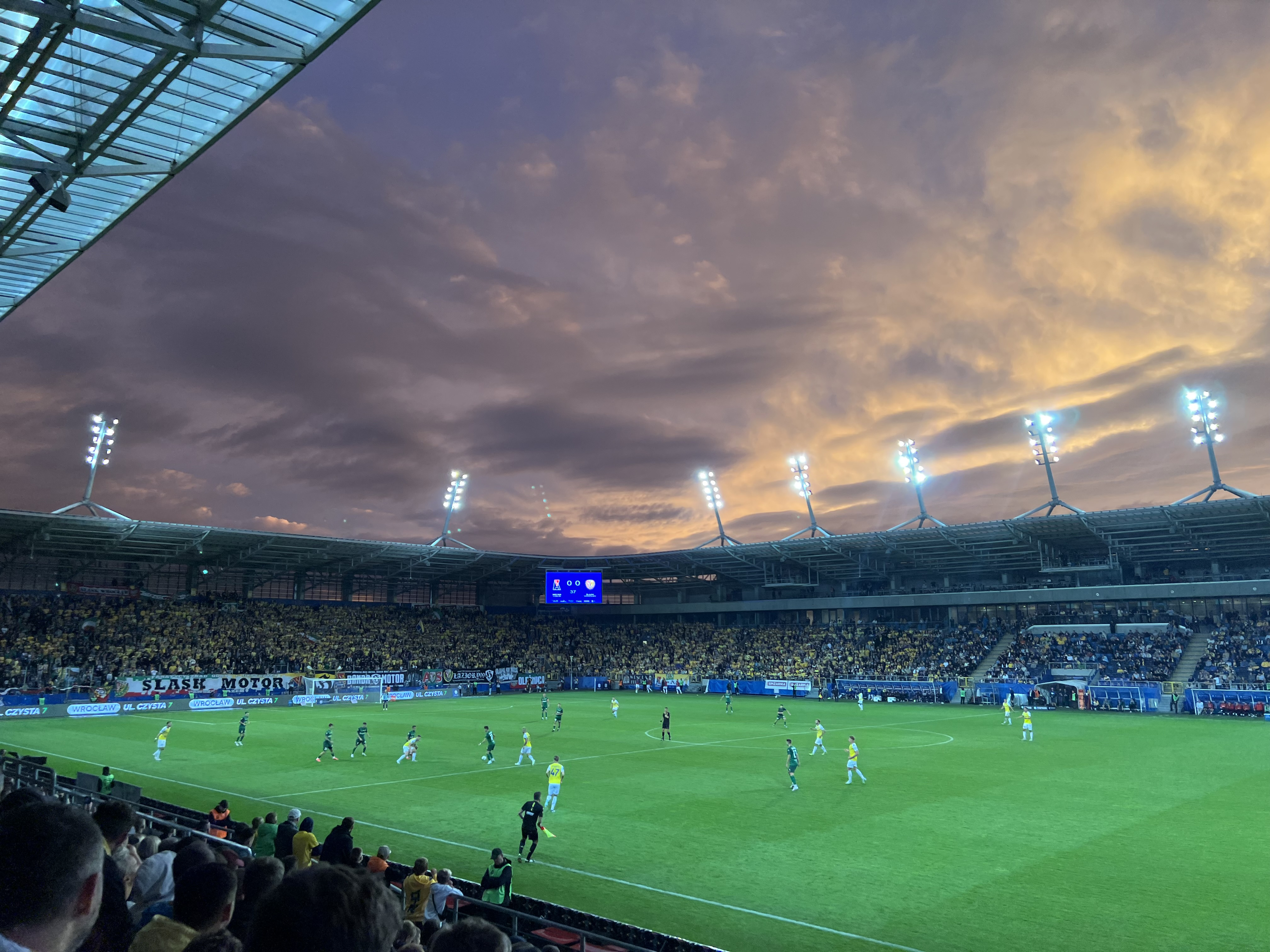
Home game with Śląsk Wrocław in the 2024–25 Ekstraklasa

In 2007, the association Piłkarskie Nadzieje Motor Lublin ("Football Hopes Motor Lublin") was founded with the objective of supporting youth development within Motor Lublin. On 6 June 2008, under the management of Ryszard Kuźma, the club secured promotion to the II liga after an eleven-year absence. In 2009, Motor concluded the season in 15th place following a 6–1 defeat to GKP Gorzów. However, after GKS Jastrzębie withdrew from the I liga, the emergency committee of the Polish Football Association (PZPN) awarded Motor Lublin the vacant place as the highest-ranked relegated team.

In 2010, the club underwent structural changes with the formation of a joint-stock company, Motor Lublin S.A.. Following a merger with Spartakus Szarowola, the first team competed in the II liga under the new entity, while youth operations were administered by LKP Motor Lublin. In August of the same year, the club unveiled a redesigned logo. Although the team finished in a relegation position in 2011, it remained in the league due to financial difficulties affecting other clubs. Later that year, a contract was signed for the design of Arena Lublin, the future home venue of the club. While the stadium was initially planned to host matches beginning in 2013, the first fixture played there took place in 2014 against KS Lublinianka.

In 2015, as part of their 65th anniversary celebrations, Motor hosted a commemorative friendly against Śląsk Wrocław, which ended in a 2–0 defeat. The following year, the club narrowly missed out on promotion after losing a two-legged playoff to Olimpia Elbląg. The COVID-19 pandemic led to a shortened 2019–20 season, which concluded with Motor being promoted to the II liga following a decision by the Lublin Football Association. In September 2020, businessman Zbigniew Jakubas acquired a majority shareholding in the club.

The club returned to the I liga in June 2023 after a penalty shootout win over Stomil Olsztyn on 11 June. On 2 June 2024, Motor secured promotion to the Ekstraklasa by defeating Arka Gdynia 2–1 in the play-off final. The club debuted in the top tier with a 2–0 loss to Raków Częstochowa; its first Ekstraklasa goal was scored by Samuel Mráz against Lechia Gdańsk at the Polsat Plus Arena Gdańsk, while Piotr Ceglarz converted the first home goal in the top division from a penalty against Korona Kielce.

== Honours ==
- Ekstraklasa
  - 12 seasons in the top division: 1980–81 – 1981–82, 1983–84 – 1986–87, 1989–90 – 1991–92, 2024–25 – present
- I liga
  - 23 seasons in the second division: 1965–66, 1968–69 – 1971–72, 1973–74 – 1979–80, 1982–83, 1987–88 – 1988–89, 1992–93 – 1995–96, 2007–08 – 2009–10, 2023–24
- Polish Cup
  - Quarter-finalists: 1978–79, 1981–82, 2022–23
- Polish U-19 Championship
  - Champions: 1971
  - Third place: 1970, 1976
- UEFA Intertoto Cup
  - Participants in 1982 – played against Lyngby BK, MSV Duisburg and FC Luzern

== Stadium ==
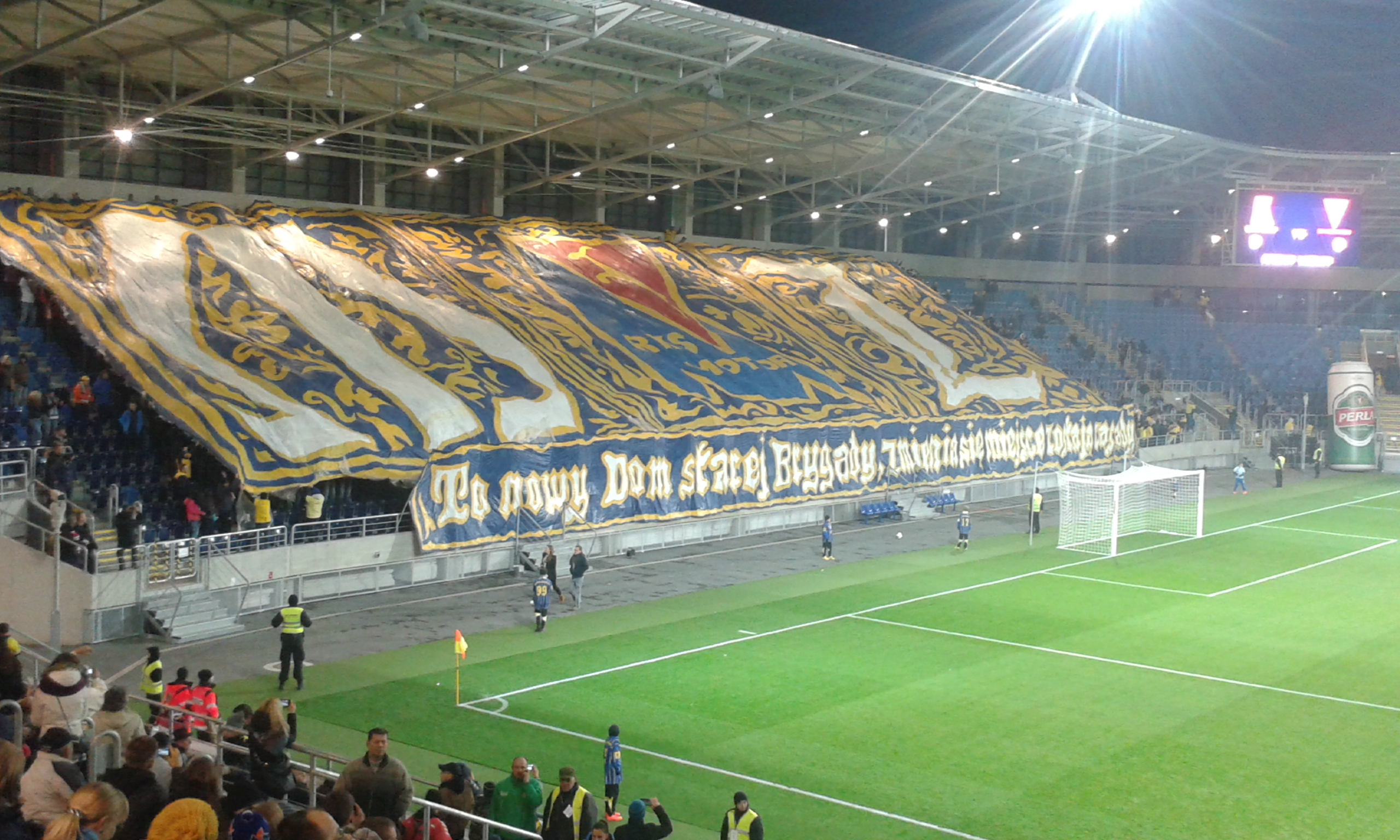
Motor Lublin supporters during a derby game against Lublinianka in 2014

Motor Lublin currently play at Arena Lublin with a capacity of 15,500 spectators.

== Supporters and rivalries ==
Motor supporters have friendly relations with fans of Śląsk Wrocław, Górnik Łęczna and Hetman Zamość. Their traditional rivals were city rivals KS Lublinianka, although this rivalry is no longer upheld. They have local rivalries with Avia Świdnik, Stal Stalowa Wola, and Radomiak Radom. Motor fans have rivalries with fans of several other teams, such as Widzew Łódź, Lechia Gdańsk and both Kraków-based teams, Wisła, and Cracovia.

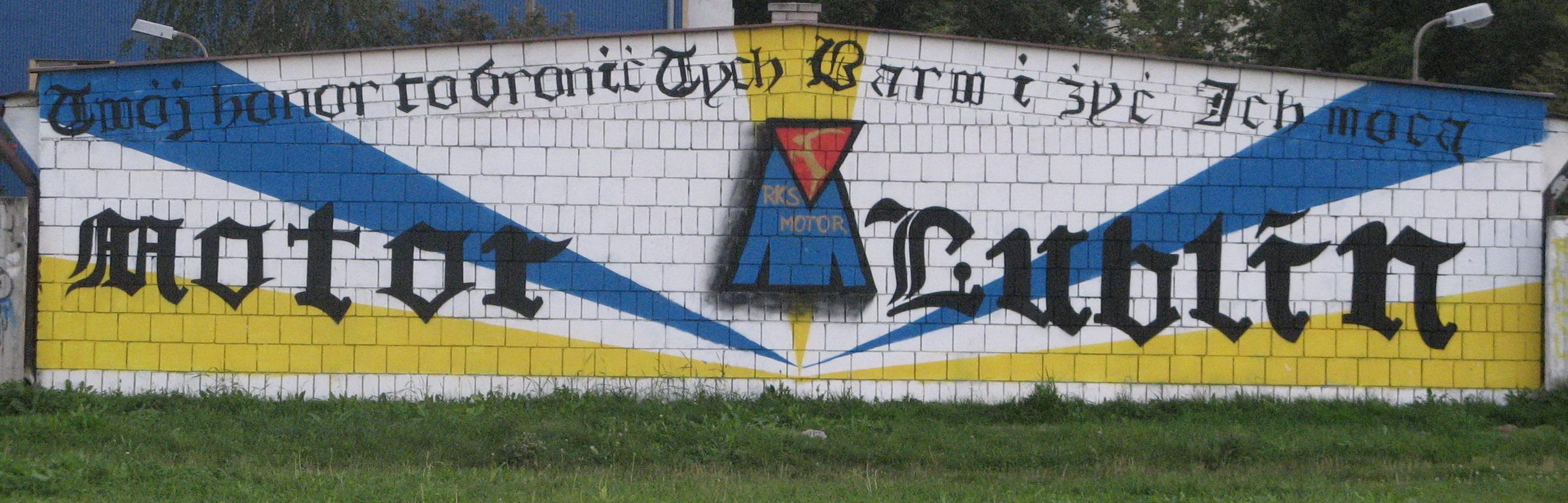
Motor Lublin graffiti by an unknown supporter. Your honour is to defend these colours and to live through their power.

== Players ==
=== Current squad ===
As of 10 September 2026

Note: Flags indicate national team as defined under FIFA eligibility rules; some limited exceptions apply. Players may hold more than one non-FIFA nationality.

No.	Pos.	Nation	Player
2	DF	POL	Paskal Meyer
4	DF	CRO	Tin Plavotić
5	DF	BLR	Artem Akatov
6	MF	POL	Mateusz Łęgowski
7	MF	POR	Ivo Rodrigues (vice-captain)
8	MF	SEN	Christopher Simon
9	MF	POR	Rony Lopes
10	FW	POL	Karol Czubak (captain)
11	MF	POR	Fábio Ronaldo
12	GK	POL	Borys Mołdach
17	MF	POL	Kamil Lukoszek (on loan from Górnik Zabrze)
18	DF	POL	Bartosz Bereszyński
22	MF	POL	Marcel Złomańczuk

No.	Pos.	Nation	Player
23	MF	KOS	Florian Haxha
24	DF	POL	Filip Luberecki
27	MF	COM	Yacine Bourhane
29	DF	DEN	Thomas Santos
30	MF	SEN	Mbaye Ndiaye
33	GK	SLO	Gašper Tratnik
39	DF	SVK	Marek Bartoš
47	MF	SEN	Alioune Oumar Tall
70	MF	FRA	Makan Aïko
71	GK	ROU	Mihai Popa
77	FW	POL	Mateusz Posmyk
90	FW	POL	Dominik Gregorski
99	GK	POL	Patryk Kukulski

=== Out on loan ===
Note: Flags indicate national team as defined under FIFA eligibility rules; some limited exceptions apply. Players may hold more than one non-FIFA nationality.

No.	Pos.	Nation	Player
13	DF	POL	Krystian Brzozowski (at Zawisza Bydgoszcz until 30 June 2027)
16	MF	POL	Franciszek Lewandowski (at Mławianka Mława until 30 June 2027)
19	MF	POL	Kacper Szymanek (at Warta Poznań until 30 June 2027)
20	FW	POL	Kacper Plichta (at GKS Tychy until 30 June 2027)

No.	Pos.	Nation	Player
21	MF	POL	Konrad Kraska (at Hetman Zamość until 30 June 2027)
45	GK	POL	Oskar Jeż (at Podlasie Biała Podlaska until 30 June 2027)
—	MF	POL	Sebastian Koziej (at Chełmianka Chełm until 30 June 2027)

== Coaching staff ==
As of 15 October 2026

Position	Staff
Head coach	(Poland) Mariusz Misiura
Assistant coaches	(Poland) Bartosz Bochiński (Poland) Tomasz Jasik (Poland) Daniel Kokosiński (Poland) Krystian Skłodowski (Poland) Łukasz Włodarek (Poland) Tomasz Włodarek
Match analyst	(Poland) Bartłomiej Jabłoński
Head of medical department	(Poland) Michał Zajko
Fitness coach	(Poland) Zbigniew Dąbek (Poland) Damian Ścibior
Goalkeeping coaches	(Poland) Tomasz Król (Poland) Marcin Zapał
Physiotherapists	(Ukraine) Viktor Adamchuk (Poland) Emilian Sapuła (Poland) Kamil Warecki
Team manager	(Poland) Rafał Marzęda
Team doctor	(Poland) Robert Węgłowski
Kitman	(Poland) Igor Miazga
Cook	(Poland) Damian Mitrut
