= 2025–26 I liga =

78th season of the second tier football league in Poland

I liga
- Season: 2025–26
- Dates: 18 July 2025 – 24 May 2026
- Champions: Wisła Kraków
- Promoted: Wisła Kraków; Śląsk Wrocław; Wieczysta Kraków
- Relegated: Znicz Pruszków; Górnik Łęczna; GKS Tychy
- Matches: 305
- Goals: 908 (2.98 per match)
- Top goalscorer: Ángel Rodado (21 goals)
- Biggest home win: Wisła 5–0 ŁKS (26 July 2025); ŁKS 5–0 Polonia (1 August 2025); Wisła 5–0 Śląsk (24 August 2025); Miedź 6–1 Tychy (28 November 2025)
- Biggest away win: Znicz 0–7 Wisła (19 August 2025)
- Highest scoring: Znicz 4–5 Stal M. (25 July 2025)
- Longest winning run: 6 matches Wisła Kraków
- Longest unbeaten run: 13 matches Śląsk Wrocław
- Longest winless run: 21 matches GKS Tychy
- Longest losing run: 6 matches GKS Tychy; Stal Mielec; Znicz Pruszków
- Highest attendance: 53,314; Ruch 1–1 Wisła (19 April 2026)
- Lowest attendance: 317; Znicz 0–3 Puszcza (24 October 2025)
- Total attendance: 1,628,154
- Average attendance: 5,338 ▲19.7%

The 2025–26 I liga (also known as Betclic I liga for sponsorship reasons) was the 78th season of the second tier domestic division in the Polish football league system since its establishment in 1949 and the 18th season of the Polish I liga under its current title. The league was operated by the PZPN.

== Season overview ==
The season started on 18 July 2025 and go into the winter break after the 19th matchday on 6 December. With the 20th matchday, the season will continue on 7 February 2026. The final 34th matchday was scheduled for 24 May 2026.

The regular season was being played as a round-robin tournament. A total of 18 teams participate, 12 of which competed in the league campaign during the previous season, while three to be relegated from the 2024–25 Ekstraklasa and the remaining three to be promoted from the 2024–25 II liga. Each team played a total of 34 matches, half at home and half away.

== Teams ==
A total of 18 teams participated in the 2025–26 edition of the I liga.

=== Changes from last season ===
The following teams have changed division since the 2024–25 season.

==== To I liga ====
Relegated from 2024–25 Ekstraklasa	Promoted from 2024–25 II liga
▼ Stal Mielec (16th) ▼ Śląsk Wrocław (17th) ▼ Puszcza Niepołomice(18th)	▲ Polonia Bytom (1st) ▲ Pogoń Grodzisk Mazowiecki (2nd) ▲ Wieczysta Kraków (PO)

==== From I liga ====
Promoted to 2025–26 Ekstraklasa	Relegated to 2025–26 II liga	Relegated to 2025–26 Liga okręgowa
▲ Arka Gdynia (1st) ▲ Bruk-Bet Termalica Nieciecza (2nd) ▲ Wisła Płock (PO)	▼ Warta Poznań (17th) ▼ Stal Stalowa Wola (18th)	▼ Kotwica Kołobrzeg (16th)

=== Stadiums and locations ===
Location of teams in 2025–26 I liga.
Location of teams in the Metropolis GZM in 2025–26 I liga.

Note: Table lists in alphabetical order.

Team	Location	Venue	Capacity
Chrobry Głogów	Głogów	GOS Stadium	2,817
GKS Tychy	Tychy	Tychy Stadium	15,150
Górnik Łęczna	Łęczna	Górnik Łęczna Stadium	7,464
ŁKS Łódź	Łódź	Władysław Król Stadium	18,029
Miedź Legnica	Legnica	White Eagle Stadium	6,864
Odra Opole	Opole	Itaka Arena	11,600
Pogoń Grodzisk Mazowiecki^{1}	Grodzisk Mazowiecki; Pruszków	Municipal Sports Stadium; MZOS Stadium	1,000; 1,977
Pogoń Siedlce	Siedlce	ROSRRiT Stadium	2,901
Polonia Bytom	Bytom	Polonia Bytom Stadium	2,220
Polonia Warsaw	Warsaw	General Kazimierz Sosnkowski Stadium	7,150
Puszcza Niepołomice	Niepołomice	Puszcza Stadium	2,118
Ruch Chorzów	Chorzów	Superauto.pl Silesian Stadium^{2}	54,378
Stal Rzeszów	Rzeszów	Stal Stadium	11,547
Stal Mielec	Mielec	Grzegorz Lato Stadium	6,864
Śląsk Wrocław	Wrocław	Tarczyński Arena Wrocław	42,771
Wieczysta Kraków^{3}	Sosnowiec	ArcelorMittal Park	11,600
Wisła Kraków	Kraków	Henryk Reyman Synerise Arena	33,326
Znicz Pruszków	Pruszków	MZOS Stadium	1,977

1. Due to accommodating Municipal Sports Stadium to I liga regulations, Pogoń Grodzisk Mazowiecki host their matches in Pruszków starting from matchday 3.
2. Since 28 October 2023, Ruch Chorzów host their games at the Silesian Stadium. It remains unclear if they will stay there or move to the Ruch Chorzów Stadium.
3. Due to the fact Wieczysta Stadium doesn't meet the I liga regulations, Wieczysta Kraków host their matches in Sosnowiec. Initially scheduled to return to Kraków to play at the Henryk Reyman Synerise Arena after winter break, they will move to that venue for the 2026–27 season.

=== Managerial changes ===
Team	Outgoing manager	Manner of departure	Date of vacancy	Position in table	Incoming manager	Date of appointment
ŁKS Łódź	(Poland) Ryszard Robakiewicz	End of interim spell	31 May 2025	Pre-season	(Poland) Szymon Grabowski	1 June 2025
Znicz Pruszków	(Poland) Marcin Przygoda	End of caretaker spell	16 June 2025	Pre-season	(Poland) Marcin Matysiak	1 July 2025
Pogoń Grodzisk Mazowiecki	(Poland) Adam Mrówka	End of caretaker spell	17 June 2025	Pre-season	(Poland) Piotr Stokowiec	1 July 2025
Górnik Łęczna	(Slovakia) Pavol Staňo	End of contract	30 June 2025	Pre-season	(Poland) Maciej Stolarczyk	1 July 2025
Miedź Legnica	(Poland) Wojciech Łobodziński	Mutual consent	4 August 2025	17th	(Poland) Janusz Niedźwiedź	5 August 2025
Ruch Chorzów	(Poland) Dawid Szulczek	Mutual consent	5 August 2025	12th	(Poland) Waldemar Fornalik	6 August 2025
Znicz Pruszków	(Poland) Marcin Matysiak	Sacked	13 August 2025	18th	(Slovakia) Peter Struhár	14 August 2025
Stal Mielec	(Serbia) Ivan Đurđević	Sacked	27 September 2025	15th	(Poland) Ireneusz Mamrot	30 September 2025
Górnik Łęczna	(Poland) Maciej Stolarczyk	Sacked	30 September 2025	17th	(Poland) Daniel Rusek	30 September 2025
Wieczysta Kraków	(Poland) Przemysław Cecherz	Sacked	5 October 2025	2nd	(Italy) Gino Lettieri	10 October 2025
Wieczysta Kraków	(Italy) Gino Lettieri	Sacked	3 November 2025	6th	(Poland) Rafał Jędrszczyk	3 November 2025
GKS Tychy	(Poland) Artur Skowronek	Sacked	3 November 2025	15th	(Poland) Michael Chojnicki	3 November 2025
ŁKS Łódź	(Poland) Szymon Grabowski	Sacked	11 November 2025	12th	(Poland) Grzegorz Szoka	11 November 2025
GKS Tychy	(Poland) Michael Chojnicki	End of caretaker spell	12 November 2025	16th	(Poland) Łukasz Piszczek	12 November 2025
Wieczysta Kraków	(Poland) Rafał Jędrszczyk	End of caretaker spell	24 November 2025	8th	(Poland) Kazimierz Moskal	24 November 2025
Polonia Bytom	(Poland) Łukasz Tomczyk	Signed by Raków Częstochowa	22 December 2025	2nd	(Poland) Patryk Czubak	5 January 2026
Górnik Łęczna	(Poland) Daniel Rusek	End of interim spell	2 January 2026	18th	(Russia) (Poland) Yuriy Shatalov	2 January 2026
Odra Opole	(Poland) Jarosław Skrobacz	Sacked	2 March 2026	14th	(Poland) Piotr Plewnia	2 March 2026
GKS Tychy	(Poland) Łukasz Piszczek	Mutual consent	9 March 2026	18th	(Austria) René Poms	10 March 2026
Polonia Bytom	(Poland) Patryk Czubak	Mutual consent	26 March 2026	11th	(Poland) Wojciech Mróz	26 March 2026
Znicz Pruszków	(Slovakia) Peter Struhár	Mutual consent	26 March 2026	17th	(Poland) Łukasz Smolarow	30 March 2026

- Italics for interim managers.

== League table ==
Pos	Team	Pld	W	D	L	GF	GA	GD	Pts	Promotion or Relegation
1	Wisła Kraków (C, P)	34	20	11	3	72	32	+40	71	Promotion to Ekstraklasa
2	Śląsk Wrocław (P)	34	17	11	6	69	47	+22	62	Promotion to Ekstraklasa
3	Wieczysta Kraków (O, P)	34	16	9	9	70	47	+23	57	Qualification for promotion play-offs
4	Chrobry Głogów	34	16	7	11	48	36	+12	55	Qualification for promotion play-offs
5	ŁKS Łódź	34	15	9	10	56	48	+8	54	Qualification for promotion play-offs
6	Polonia Warsaw	34	15	8	11	52	49	+3	53 (Note: Head-to-head results: Polonia Warsaw 4 pts, Ruch Chorzów 1 pt.)	Qualification for promotion play-offs
7	Ruch Chorzów	34	14	11	9	54	46	+8	53	
8	Miedź Legnica	34	15	7	12	52	53	−1	52	
9	Puszcza Niepołomice	34	12	13	9	45	40	+5	49	
10	Polonia Bytom	34	13	8	13	56	50	+6	47	
11	Pogoń Grodzisk Mazowiecki	34	11	12	11	51	54	−3	45	
12	Odra Opole	34	11	11	12	34	40	−6	44	
13	Stal Rzeszów	34	12	7	15	49	60	−11	43	
14	Stal Mielec	34	10	6	18	51	62	−11	36 (Note: Head-to-head results: Stal Mielec 4 pts, Pogoń Siedlce 1 pt.)	
15	Pogoń Siedlce	34	9	9	16	33	43	−10	36	
16	Znicz Pruszków (R)	34	7	7	20	40	68	−28	28	Relegation to II liga
17	Górnik Łęczna (R)	34	5	12	17	39	62	−23	27	Relegation to II liga
18	GKS Tychy (R)	34	5	8	21	40	74	−34	23	Relegation to II liga

Source: 1liga.org, 90minut.pl
Rules for classification: 1) Points; 2) Head-to-head points; 3) Head-to-head goal difference; 4) Goal difference; 6) Goals scored; 7) Number of wins; 8) Number of away wins.
(Note: Head-to-head record is used only after all the matches between the teams in question have been played)
(C) Champions; (O) Play-off winner; (P) Promoted; (R) Relegated

== Positions by round ==
Team ╲ Round	1	2	3	4	5	6	7	8	9	10	11	12	13	14	15	16	17	18	19	20	21	22	23	24	25	26	27	28	29	30	31	32	33	34
Wisła Kraków	1	1	1	1	1	1	1	1	1	1	1	1	1	1	1	1	1	1	1	1	1	1	1	1	1	1	1	1	1	1	1	1	1	1
Śląsk Wrocław	7	13	9	5	9	3	5	3	3	2	3	4	2	2	3	5	5	6	7	8	9	8	6	7	2	2	2	2	2	2	2	2	2	2
Wieczysta Kraków	7	4	2	2	3	2	2	2	2	4	2	2	3	5	6	8	7	8	6	4	2	3	5	3	5	7	8	4	4	3	3	3	3	3
Chrobry Głogów	2	7	8	6	5	8	9	12	6	8	7	7	5	4	4	3	4	4	4	6	4	2	4	2	4	3	3	3	3	4	4	4	4	4
ŁKS Łódź	6	11	5	10	4	6	6	8	11	12	13	11	8	10	7	12	10	11	11	11	11	10	11	9	9	10	6	8	10	7	5	5	6	5
Polonia Warsaw	7	13	9	3	10	11	12	6	8	9	10	12	13	13	12	9	8	7	9	5	7	4	2	4	6	5	7	9	5	5	7	6	7	6
Ruch Chorzów	7	4	12	13	13	10	11	13	7	5	8	9	10	11	8	6	9	9	8	9	10	11	10	8	7	6	5	7	6	6	6	7	5	7
Miedź Legnica	13	16	17	17	17	17	15	14	13	14	12	13	12	12	10	13	11	10	10	10	8	9	8	6	8	8	9	5	7	9	8	8	9	8
Puszcza Niepołomice	7	12	13	15	14	15	16	16	16	16	16	14	15	14	14	14	14	14	14	14	14	14	12	12	12	12	11	12	9	10	9	10	8	9
Polonia Bytom	2	2	6	11	12	7	7	4	4	3	4	5	6	6	5	4	3	3	2	2	6	7	7	11	11	11	12	11	12	11	10	9	10	10
Pogoń Grodzisk Mazowiecki	5	4	2	3	2	5	3	7	9	6	5	3	4	3	2	2	2	2	3	3	3	5	3	5	3	4	4	6	8	8	11	11	12	11
Odra Opole	16	9	7	9	8	12	14	15	15	10	11	8	9	9	13	10	13	12	13	12	12	12	14	13	13	13	13	13	13	13	13	13	11	12
Stal Rzeszów	14	8	11	8	7	13	13	10	5	7	6	6	7	7	9	7	6	5	5	7	5	6	9	10	10	9	10	10	11	12	12	12	13	13
Stal Mielec	18	10	14	14	15	14	8	11	14	15	15	16	16	16	16	15	15	16	17	17	17	18	16	15	15	15	15	15	15	15	15	15	15	14
Pogoń Siedlce	7	13	15	12	11	9	10	5	10	11	9	10	11	8	11	11	12	13	12	13	13	13	13	14	14	14	14	14	14	14	14	14	14	15
Znicz Pruszków	15	16	17	18	18	18	18	18	18	18	18	18	18	18	18	18	16	15	15	15	15	15	15	16	16	17	16	17	17	17	17	17	17	16
Górnik Łęczna	16	18	16	16	16	16	17	17	17	17	17	17	17	17	17	17	18	18	18	18	18	16	17	17	17	16	17	16	16	16	16	16	16	17
GKS Tychy	4	3	4	7	6	4	4	9	12	13	14	15	14	15	15	16	17	17	16	16	16	17	18	18	18	18	18	18	18	18	18	18	18	18

Promotion to Ekstraklasa
Qualification for promotion play-offs
Relegation to II liga

Source: 90minut.pl

== Results ==
Home \ Away	CHR	TYC	GÓR	ŁKS	MIE	ODR	PGM	PSI	PBY	PWA	PUS	RUC	SMI	SRZ	ŚLĄ	WIE	WIS	ZNI
Chrobry Głogów	—	3–2	2–0	2–1	2–2	3–0	3–0	2–1	0–1	2–0	1–2	1–1	2–1	1–1	1–2	1–2	0–1	3–2
GKS Tychy	0–1	—	2–2	3–2	4–3	1–1	1–2	1–3	1–2	1–1	1–2	0–4	0–1	3–3	2–4	3–3	3–4	0–1
Górnik Łęczna	1–0	1–0	—	1–2	2–0	0–2	3–0	1–1	0–3	1–2	2–2	0–1	1–1	0–4	0–4	0–3	1–2	1–1
ŁKS Łódź	1–3	3–1	3–1	—	0–0	1–1	3–2	4–0	5–0	2–2	0–3	2–2	2–0	2–1	2–1	0–0	1–1	1–0
Miedź Legnica	0–1	6–1	0–2	2–1	—	2–1	1–1	2–2	1–1	1–1	2–1	1–2	1–0	2–1	3–1	3–2	2–0	2–1
Odra Opole	0–2	0–0	3–1	1–1	2–1	—	3–1	1–0	0–2	1–2	1–0	1–1	0–2	2–1	1–1	2–0	1–1	0–2
Pogoń Grodzisk Mazowiecki	1–1	0–0	3–3	3–0	4–0	2–1	—	0–2	2–1	3–2	1–1	2–2	1–2	2–1	2–2	1–4	1–1	4–1
Pogoń Siedlce	1–2	0–1	1–1	3–1	2–0	0–1	1–2	—	2–0	1–1	0–0	2–1	1–3	1–2	2–3	0–2	0–0	1–0
Polonia Bytom	2–0	1–1	2–2	2–3	4–0	0–0	3–0	1–1	—	3–2	1–1	0–1	4–1	0–1	1–3	4–2	1–1	2–0
Polonia Warsaw	1–0	1–2	2–1	0–1	1–1	1–0	2–1	2–0	2–1	—	1–2	0–0	5–2	2–3	0–4	1–6	0–1	0–0
Puszcza Niepołomice	0–0	1–2	2–1	1–0	1–3	1–1	1–1	3–0	2–1	2–1	—	1–1	1–1	4–1	1–1	0–1	0–3	1–0
Ruch Chorzów	2–1	2–1	2–1	2–1	3–1	2–0	2–2	0–2	1–1	2–3	2–0	—	2–1	4–0	2–2	0–2	1–1	1–2
Stal Mielec	1–2	4–0	1–1	1–2	1–2	2–1	1–2	0–0	4–1	1–3	1–1	2–2	—	3–1	2–3	3–1	0–4	1–2
Stal Rzeszów	2–2	2–1	1–1	1–4	1–2	0–1	1–0	1–1	3–1	0–2	2–2	0–1	3–2	—	2–1	1–5	1–2	1–0
Śląsk Wrocław	2–1	2–1	3–1	2–2	3–1	3–0	0–0	1–0	2–3	1–1	2–0	3–1	2–1	1–1	—	1–1	3–0 (w/o)	2–2
Wieczysta Kraków	1–1	2–0	2–2	0–2	0–1	0–0	2–3	2–1	4–3	1–2	3–1	4–2	2–0	1–2	3–3	—	1–1	4–0
Wisła Kraków	2–0	3–1	3–2	5–0	3–2	2–2	3–2	2–0	1–0	1–2	2–2	3–0	3–0	2–1	5–0	1–1	—	1–1
Znicz Pruszków	0–2	4–0	2–2	1–1	1–2	2–3	0–0	0–1	1–4	1–4	0–3	3–2	4–5	2–3	2–1	2–3	0–7	—

Source: 1liga.org, 90minut.pl
Legend: Blue = home team win; Yellow = draw; Red = away team win.
For upcoming matches, an "a" indicates there is an article about the rivalry between the two participants.

== Results by round ==
Team ╲ Round	1	2	3	4	5	6	7	8	9	10	11	12	13	14	15	16	17	18	19	20	21	22	23	24	25	26	27	28	29	30	31	32	33	34
Chrobry Głogów	W	L	D	W	D	L	D	D	W	L	W	W	W	W	L	W	L	W	L	D	W	W	L	W	L	W	D	L	W	L	W	L	W	D
GKS Tychy	W	W	L	D	D	W	L	L	L	L	L	L	D	L	L	L	L	L	D	L	D	L	L	L	L	D	L	W	W	L	L	L	D	D
Górnik Łęczna	L	L	D	D	D	D	D	L	D	L	L	W	D	L	L	L	L	D	L	L	D	W	D	L	D	W	L	W	W	D	L	L	L	L
ŁKS Łódź	W	L	W	L	W	L	D	D	L	D	L	W	W	L	W	L	W	D	D	W	L	W	D	W	D	D	W	L	W	W	W	D	L	W
Miedź Legnica	L	L	L	L	D	W	W	W	D	L	W	L	D	W	W	L	W	W	W	D	W	L	D	W	L	D	D	W	L	L	W	W	L	W
Odra Opole	L	W	W	D	D	L	L	D	D	W	D	W	D	D	L	W	L	L	L	W	D	L	L	W	D	D	W	W	D	L	L	W	W	L
Pogoń Grodzisk Mazowiecki	W	D	W	L	W	L	D	L	D	W	W	W	D	W	W	W	D	L	D	D	D	D	W	L	W	L	L	L	D	L	L	L	D	D
Pogoń Siedlce	D	L	L	W	W	D	D	W	L	L	W	L	D	W	D	D	D	L	L	L	W	D	D	L	W	L	L	L	W	W	L	L	L	L
Polonia Bytom	W	W	L	L	L	W	D	W	W	W	L	D	D	L	W	W	W	D	W	L	L	D	L	L	D	D	D	L	L	W	W	W	L	L
Polonia Warsaw	D	L	W	W	D	L	D	W	D	L	D	L	L	W	W	W	W	W	D	W	D	W	W	L	L	D	L	L	W	W	L	W	L	W
Puszcza Niepołomice	D	D	D	L	D	L	D	D	L	W	D	D	L	W	D	W	L	L	D	W	L	W	W	W	W	D	W	L	W	D	W	D	W	L
Ruch Chorzów	D	W	L	L	D	W	D	D	W	W	L	L	D	D	W	W	L	W	W	D	L	L	W	W	W	D	D	L	D	D	W	W	W	L
Stal Mielec	L	W	L	D	L	W	W	D	L	L	L	L	L	L	D	D	L	L	L	L	D	L	W	W	L	W	W	W	L	L	L	D	W	W
Stal Rzeszów	L	W	D	W	D	L	L	W	W	L	W	W	L	L	D	W	W	W	D	D	W	L	L	L	D	W	L	L	L	L	L	W	L	D
Śląsk Wrocław	D	L	W	W	D	W	L	W	W	W	D	L	W	W	L	L	D	D	D	D	L	W	W	W	W	D	W	W	D	W	W	D	W	D
Wieczysta Kraków	D	W	W	W	W	D	L	W	D	W	D	L	D	L	L	L	W	D	W	W	W	D	L	W	L	L	W	D	W	W	W	L	W	D
Wisła Kraków	W	W	W	W	W	W	L	D	W	W	D	W	W	W	W	L	D	W	D	W	D	D	D	L	W	D	W	D	D	D	W	W	W	W
Znicz Pruszków	L	L	L	L	L	L	W	L	L	W	L	W	D	L	L	L	W	D	W	L	D	D	D	L	L	L	W	L	D	D	L	L	L	W

Source: 1liga.org, 90minut.pl
W = Win; D = Draw; L = Loss

== Promotion play-offs ==
I liga play-offs final for the 2025–26 season will be played on 31 May 2026. The teams who finished in 3rd, 4th, 5th and 6th place were set to compete. The fixtures were determined by final league position – 3rd team of regular season vs 6th team of regular season and 4th team of regular season vs 5th team of regular season. The winner of final match will be promoted to the Ekstraklasa for next season. All matches will be played in a stadiums of team which occupied higher position in regular season.

Semi-finals; 28 May 2026
3	Wieczysta Kraków	3
6	Polonia Warsaw	2
4	Chrobry Głogów	1 (5)
5	ŁKS Łódź	1 (4)

Final; 31 May 2026
3	Wieczysta Kraków	2
4	Chrobry Głogów	1

=== Matches ===
==== Semi-finals ====
28 May 2026
17:30 CEST (UTC+02:00)

Chrobry Głogów	1–1 (a.e.t.)	ŁKS Łódź
Laskowski 76'	Report	Arasa 61'
Penalties
Bąk (penalty missed); Mazur (penalty scored); Janczukowicz (penalty scored); Ozimek (penalty scored); Grič (penalty scored); Lis (penalty scored)	5–4	(penalty scored) Lewandowski; (penalty scored) Rudol; (penalty scored) Pingot; (penalty scored) Fałowski; (penalty missed) Krykun; (penalty missed) Wojciechowski

Stadion GOS, Głogów
Attendance: 2,619
Referee: Bartosz Frankowski (Toruń)
28 May 2026
20:30 CEST (UTC+02:00)

Wieczysta Kraków	3–2	Polonia Warsaw
Feiertag 26', 74'; Semedo 38'	Report	Durmuş 31'; Skrabb 67'

Synerise Arena Kraków, Kraków
Attendance: 6,073
Referee: Jarosław Przybył (Kluczbork)

==== Final ====
31 May 2026
20:45 CEST (UTC+02:00)

Wieczysta Kraków	2–1	Chrobry Głogów
Semedo 30'; Feiertag 56'	Report	Mazur 14'

Synerise Arena Kraków, Kraków
Attendance: 7,000
Referee: Karol Arys (Szczecin)

== Season statistics ==
=== Top goalscorers ===
Rank	Player	Team	Goals
1	(Spain) Ángel Rodado	Wisła Kraków	21
2	(Poland) Łukasz Zjawiński	Polonia Warsaw	20
3	(Poland) Przemysław Banaszak	Śląsk Wrocław	16
4	(Austria) Stefan Feiertag	Wieczysta Kraków	14
4	(Poland) Fabian Piasecki	ŁKS Łódź	14
4	(Poland) Patryk Szwedzik	Ruch Chorzów	14
7	(Brazil) Jonathan	Stal Rzeszów	12
7	(Poland) Daniel Stanclik	Miedź Legnica	12
9	(Poland) Rafał Adamski	Pogoń Grodzisk Mazowiecki	11
9	(Poland) Jakub Arak	Polonia Bytom	11
9	(Poland) Oliwier Kwiatkowski	Polonia Bytom	11
9	(Poland) Radosław Majewski	Znicz Pruszków	11
9	(Poland) Piotr Samiec-Talar	Śląsk Wrocław	11

=== Hat-tricks ===
Player	For	Against	Result	Date	Ref
(Portugal) Frederico Duarte	Wisła Kraków	ŁKS Łódź	5–0 (H)	26 July 2025	
(Poland) Rafał Adamski	Pogoń Grodzisk Mazowiecki	Znicz Pruszków	4–1 (H)	16 August 2025	
(Poland) Patryk Szwedzik	Ruch Chorzów	Stal Rzeszów	4–0 (H)	20 August 2025	
(Spain) Ángel Rodado	Wisła Kraków	Śląsk Wrocław	5–0 (H)	24 August 2025	
(Poland) Rafał Adamski	Pogoń Grodzisk Mazowiecki	Górnik Łęczna	3–3 (H)	14 September 2025	
(Poland) Daniel Stanclik	Miedź Legnica	GKS Tychy	6–1 (H)	28 November 2025	
(Bosnia and Herzegovina) Luka Marjanac	Śląsk Wrocław	Polonia Warsaw	4–0 (A)	10 April 2026	

== Attendances ==
Pos	Team	Total	High	Low	Average	Change
1	Wisła Kraków	459,782	33,000	18,025	27,046	+46.8%
2	Śląsk Wrocław	268,725	31,119	9,530	16,795	−10.8%^{1}
3	Ruch Chorzów	225,943	53,314	7,518	13,291	+1.9%
4	ŁKS Łódź	117,970	10,868	4,363	6,939	+5.4%
5	Odra Opole	92,026	10,321	2,731	5,413	+62.8%
6	GKS Tychy	68,510	7,480	2,156	4,030	−1.9%
7	Miedź Legnica	52,228	5,816	2,012	3,072	−16.3%
8	Stal Rzeszów	51,847	6,129	1,748	3,050	−14.4%
9	Stal Mielec	51,350	6,477	1,253	3,021	−38.9%^{1}
10	Wieczysta Kraków	44,897	31,813	329	2,641	+297.1%^{2}
11	Polonia Warsaw	40,624	5,226	1,121	2,390	+3.4%
12	Pogoń Siedlce	30,585	2,756	926	1,799	+35.1%
13	Górnik Łęczna	27,216	4,200	885	1,601	+0.9%
14	Puszcza Niepołomice	24,948	2,000	735	1,468	−31.8%^{1}
15	Polonia Bytom	21,218	2,200	802	1,248	+23.3%^{2}
16	Chrobry Głogów	20,553	2,407	595	1,209	+26.6%
17	Pogoń Grodzisk Mazowiecki	16,639	1,650	456	979	+12.4%^{2}
18	Znicz Pruszków	13,093	1,943	317	770	+4.2%
	League total	1,628,154	53,314	317	5,338	+19.7%

Source: 90minut.pl
Notes:
1. Team played last season in Ekstraklasa.
2. Team played last season in II liga.

== Awards ==
=== Monthly awards ===
==== Player of the Month ====
Month	Player	Team
July & August 2025	(Spain) Ángel Rodado	Wisła Kraków
September 2025	(Poland) Piotr Ceglarz	Ruch Chorzów
October 2025	(Spain) Ángel Rodado	Wisła Kraków
November & December 2025	(Poland) Jakub Arak	Polonia Bytom
February & March 2026	(Albania) Amarildo Gjoni	Puszcza Niepołomice
April 2026	(Albania) Amarildo Gjoni	Puszcza Niepołomice
May 2026	(Austria) Stefan Feiertag	Wieczysta Kraków

==== Coach of the Month ====
Month	Coach	Team
July & August 2025	(Poland) Mariusz Jop	Wisła Kraków
September 2025	(Poland) Piotr Stokowiec	Pogoń Grodzisk Mazowiecki
October 2025	(Poland) Łukasz Becella	Chrobry Głogów
November & December 2025	(Poland) Marek Zub	Stal Rzeszów
February & March 2026	(Poland) Tomasz Tułacz	Puszcza Niepołomice
April 2026	(Slovenia) Ante Šimundža	Śląsk Wrocław
May 2026		

=== Annual awards ===
Award	Player	Club
Player of the Season	(Spain) Ángel Rodado	Wisła Kraków
Coach of the Season	(Poland) Mariusz Jop	Wisła Kraków
Foreigner of the Season	(Spain) Ángel Rodado	Wisła Kraków
Young Player of the Season	(Poland) Maciej Kuziemka	Wisła Kraków
Discovery of the Season	(Poland) Rafał Adamski	Pogoń Grodzisk Mazowiecki
Goal of the Season	(Poland) Jarosław Jach	Znicz Pruszków
Save of the Season	(Poland) Patryk Letkiewicz	Wisła Kraków

== See also ==
- 2025–26 Ekstraklasa
- 2025–26 II liga
- 2025–26 III liga
- 2025–26 Polish Cup
- 2025 Polish Super Cup
