= 2026–27 II liga =

II liga
- Season: 2026–27
- Dates: 24 July 2026 – 9 June 2027
- Matches: 63
- Goals: 202 (3.21 per match)
- All statistics correct as of 7 September 2026.

The 2026–27 II liga (also known as Betclic II liga for sponsorship reasons) is the 79th season of the third tier domestic division in the Polish football league system since its establishment in 1948 and the 19th season of the Polish II liga under its current title. The league is operated by the Polish Football Association.

The league is contested by 18 teams. The regular season is played in a round-robin tournament. The season started on 24 July 2026 and will conclude on 29 May 2027 (regular season), with play-offs being held in June 2026.

== Teams ==
A total of 18 teams participate in the 2026–27 II liga season. This season marks as the first time ever, when the club from Lubusz Voivodeship will play in the central league, after Lechia Zielona Góra was promoted from their group in 2025–26 III liga.

=== Changes from last season ===
The following teams have changed division since the 2025–26 season.

==== To II liga ====
Relegated from 2025–26 I liga	Promoted from 2025–26 III liga
▼ Górnik Łęczna (16th) ▼ Znicz Pruszków (17th) ▼GKS Tychy (18th)	▲ Legia Warsaw II (Group I) ▲ Zawisza Bydgoszcz (Group II) ▲ Lechia Zielona Góra (Group III) ▲ Avia Świdnik (Group IV)

==== From II liga ====
Promoted to 2026–27 I liga	Relegated to 2026–27 III liga	Withdrew
▲ Unia Skierniewice (1st) ▲ Warta Poznań (2nd) ▲ Podbeskidzie Bielsko-Biała (PO)	▼ Zagłębie Sosnowiec (15th) ▼KKS 1925 Kalisz (16th) ▼ ŁKS Łódź II (17th)	▼GKS Jastrzębie (18th)

=== Stadiums and locations ===
Location of teams in 2026–27 II liga.

Note: Table lists in alphabetical order.

Team	Location	Venue	Capacity
Avia Świdnik	Świdnik	Czesław Krygier Municipal Stadium	2,886
Chojniczanka Chojnice	Chojnice	Chojniczanka 1930 Municipal Stadium	2,923
GKS Tychy	Tychy	Tychy Stadium	15,150
Górnik Łęczna	Łęczna	Górnik Łęczna Stadium	7,464
Hutnik Kraków	Kraków	Suche Stawy Stadium	6,000
Lechia Zielona Góra	Zielona Góra	MOSiR Stadium	1,000
Legia Warsaw II	Książenice	Legia Training Center	1,000
Olimpia Grudziądz	Grudziądz; Iława	Bronisław Malinowski Stadium^{1} Iława Municipal Stadium	5,323; 1,778
Podhale Nowy Targ	Nowy Targ	Marshal Józef Piłsudski Stadium	900
Rekord Bielsko-Biała	Bielsko-Biała	Centrum Sportu REKORD	593
Resovia Rzeszów	Rzeszów	Stal Stadium^{2} Subcarpathian Athletic Center	11,547; 8,000
Sandecja Nowy Sącz	Nowy Sącz	Sandecja Stadium	8,111
Sokół Kleczew	Kleczew	OSiR Stadium	800
Stal Stalowa Wola	Stalowa Wola	Subcarpathian Football Center	3,764
Śląsk Wrocław II	Wrocław	Oporowska Stadium	8,346
Świt Szczecin	Szczecin	Obiekt Sportowy Skolwin	974
Zawisza Bydgoszcz	Bydgoszcz	Zdzisław Krzyszkowiak Stadium	20,187
Znicz Pruszków	Pruszków	MZOS Stadium	1,977

1. Due to the renovation of the Bronisław Malinowski Stadium in Grudziądz, Olimpia Grudziądz will play their home games at the Iława Municipal Stadium in November and December 2026.
2. Due to the renovation of the Resovia Stadium in Rzeszów, Resovia play their home games at the Stal Stadium. However, it is expected for them to play in a new stadium by the end of 2026.

=== Managerial changes ===
Team	Outgoing manager	Manner of departure	Date of vacancy	Position in table	Incoming manager	Date of appointment
Stal Stalowa Wola	(Poland) Dariusz Kantor	End of contract	30 June 2026	Pre-season	(Poland) Przemysław Cecherz	1 July 2026
Olimpia Grudziądz	(Poland) Artur Kosznicki	End of contract	30 June 2026	Pre-season	(Poland) Dawid Pędziałek	1 July 2026
Legia Warsaw II	(Poland) Filip Raczkowski	End of contract	30 June 2026	Pre-season	(Poland) Marcin Matysiak	1 July 2026
Stal Stalowa Wola	(Poland) Przemysław Cecherz	Mutual consent	14 July 2026	Pre-season	(Poland) Jarosław Skrobacz	17 July 2026
Świt Szczecin	(Poland) Marcin Sasal	Sacked	13 August 2026	18th	(Poland) Przemysław Cecherz	14 August 2026
Resovia	(Poland) Kamil Kuzera	Sacked	12 September 2026	18th	(Poland) Dariusz Kantor	14 September 2026
Stal Stalowa Wola	(Poland) Jarosław Skrobacz	Sacked	15 September 2026	13th	(Poland) Mariusz Arczewski	15 September 2026
Sandecja Nowy Sącz	(Poland) Rafał Smalec	Sacked	5 October 2026	9th	(Poland) Ireneusz Mamrot	5 October 2026
Sokół Kleczew	(Poland) Tomasz Pozorski	Mutual consent	19 October 2026	16th	(Poland) Krzysztof Urtnowski	20 October 2026
Rekord Bielsko-Biała	(Poland) Piotr Tworek	Mutual consent	16 November 2026	15th	(Poland) Artur Kosznicki	19 November 2026

- Italics for interim managers.

== League table ==
Pos	Team	Pld	W	D	L	GF	GA	GD	Pts	Promotion or Relegation
1	Znicz Pruszków	15	10	3	2	29	17	+12	33	Promotion to I liga
2	Górnik Łęczna	15	9	2	4	33	15	+18	29	Promotion to I liga
3	GKS Tychy	14	7	6	1	20	9	+11	27	Qualification for the promotion play-offs
4	Chojniczanka Chojnice	15	7	3	5	26	24	+2	24	Qualification for the promotion play-offs
5	Zawisza Bydgoszcz	14	6	4	4	26	20	+6	22	Qualification for the promotion play-offs
6	Legia Warsaw II	15	7	1	7	30	25	+5	22	Qualification for the promotion play-offs
7	Sandecja Nowy Sącz	15	6	4	5	23	20	+3	22	
8	Podhale Nowy Targ	15	5	7	3	26	24	+2	22	
9	Lechia Zielona Góra	15	6	4	5	24	26	−2	22	
10	Olimpia Grudziądz	15	6	4	5	19	22	−3	22	
11	Hutnik Kraków	15	6	3	6	24	22	+2	21	
12	Avia Świdnik	15	6	2	7	18	22	−4	20	
13	Stal Stalowa Wola	15	6	1	8	24	28	−4	19	Qualification for the relegation play-offs
14	Rekord Bielsko-Biała	15	5	3	7	20	19	+1	18	Qualification for the relegation play-offs
15	Sokół Kleczew	15	4	6	5	21	30	−9	18	Relegation to III liga
16	Świt Szczecin	15	3	4	8	19	32	−13	13	Relegation to III liga
17	Śląsk Wrocław II	15	3	1	11	22	33	−11	10	Relegation to III liga
18	Resovia Rzeszów	15	0	6	9	9	25	−16	6	Relegation to III liga

Updated to match(es) played on 8 November 2026. Source: 90minut.pl
Rules for classification: 1) Points; 2) Head-to-head points; 3) Head-to-head goal difference; 4) Goal difference; 6) Goals scored; 7) Number of wins; 8) Number of away wins.
(Note: Head-to-head record is used only after all the matches between the teams in question have been played)

== Positions by round ==
Team ╲ Round	1	2	3	4	5	6	7	8	9	10	11	12	13	14	15	16	17	18	19	20	21	22	23	24	25	26	27	28	29	30	31	32	33	34
Znicz Pruszków	6	3	2	2	3	3	1	1	1	1	1	1	1	1	1																			
Górnik Łęczna	4	10	13	10	8	6	5	2	2	2	3	3	3	3	2																			
GKS Tychy	5	2	5	4	2	4	2	3	3	3	2	2	2	2	3																			
Chojniczanka Chojnice	14	17	17	16	14	12	12	11	8	11	11	8	11	9	4																			
Zawisza Bydgoszcz	7	14	10	7	4	2	4	5	4	5	8	12	6	4	5																			
Legia Warsaw II	17	15	11	15	10	13	14	15	14	14	14	14	13	10	6																			
Sandecja Nowy Sącz	11	5	8	6	6	5	6	6	7	9	9	4	7	5	7																			
Podhale Nowy Targ	2	7	9	14	15	9	7	7	9	4	5	5	5	8	8																			
Lechia Zielona Góra	7	11	7	11	11	7	10	9	10	7	10	11	14	12	9																			
Olimpia Grudziądz	18	13	14	12	7	10	8	10	11	10	6	6	4	6	10																			
Hutnik Kraków	11	5	3	1	1	1	3	4	6	8	4	7	10	7	11																			
Avia Świdnik	1	1	1	3	5	8	11	12	13	12	12	10	12	14	12																			
Stal Stalowa Wola	3	9	12	9	12	14	13	13	12	13	13	13	8	11	13																			
Rekord Bielsko-Biała	7	4	4	5	9	11	9	8	5	6	7	9	9	13	14																			
Sokół Kleczew	7	12	15	13	16	16	16	14	16	16	16	16	15	15	15																			
Świt Szczecin	13	16	18	18	18	18	17	17	17	17	17	17	17	17	16																			
Śląsk Wrocław II	16	8	6	8	13	15	15	16	15	15	15	15	16	16	17																			
Resovia Rzeszów	14	18	16	17	17	17	18	18	18	18	18	18	18	18	18																			

Promotion to I liga
Qualification for promotion play-offs
Qualification for relegation play-offs
Relegation to III liga

Updated to match(es) played on 8 November 2026. Source: 90minut.pl

== Results ==
Home \ Away	AVI	CHO	TYC	GÓR	HUT	LEC	LEG	OLI	POD	REK	RES	SAN	SOK	STA	ŚLĄ	ŚWI	ZAW	ZNI
Avia Świdnik	—				2–1	1–3	8–2	4–1		0–1		3–0				1–0	1–4	0–2
Chojniczanka Chojnice	1–0	—	0–1				2–3	3–1	2–2		2–2			2–0			0–2	1–4
GKS Tychy	1–0		—	3–0		1–2		1–1	0–0	1–0		0–0			3–0			
Górnik Łęczna	0–1	3–1		—	1–0		4–1		5–2	1–0				1–2				3–0
Hutnik Kraków		1–2	0–2		—		2–0	1–2		3–2	1–1			2–1		3–0	1–1	
Lechia Zielona Góra		1–1		0–6	1–1	—	0–2	2–2		1–1			6–1	2–1		1–4		1–3
Legia Warsaw II			1–2				—	2–1	3–0	1–2	2–1		6–1	0–2		5–0		
Olimpia Grudziądz				4–2				—	1–3		1–0							
Podhale Nowy Targ	1–0				2–5	0–0			—	2–1	1–1	2–1		5–0	3–1	2–2		
Rekord Bielsko-Biała		1–2						1–2		—	1–1	1–1		3–1	2–1	3–0	3–0	
Resovia Rzeszów	1–1		2–2	0–2		0–1					—	0–3	0–0		1–5			
Sandecja Nowy Sącz		3–0		1–1	0–0	1–3		2–1				—			4–2		4–3	0–0
Sokół Kleczew	2–2	1–1	1–3	0–4	1–2			1–1	0–0	3–0		3–2	—		4–2			
Stal Stalowa Wola	4–0		1–2					0–0			2–0	1–0	1–2	—	3–2		3–3	
Śląsk Wrocław II	1–2	1–2		2–0	2–0	0–1	2–2	0–1							—		0–2	2–3
Świt Szczecin		1–5	1–1	2–3				1–1				0–1	2–1	1–2	3–0	—		
Zawisza Bydgoszcz				0–0		2–1	4–1	1–2	3–2		1–0		1–1			4–2	—	0–1
Znicz Pruszków			1–1		4–2		2–1	0–1	2–2	1–0	1–0		2–2	4–2		1–1		—

Updated to match(es) played on 22 November 2026. Source: 90minut.pl
Legend: Blue = home team win; Yellow = draw; Red = away team win.
For upcoming matches, an "a" indicates there is an article about the rivalry between the two participants.

== Results by round ==
Team ╲ Round	1	2	3	4	5	6	7	8	9	10	11	12	13	14	15	16	17	18	19	20	21	22	23	24	25	26	27	28	29	30	31	32	33	34
Avia Świdnik	W	W	W	L	L	L	L	L	D	D	W	W	L	L	W																			
Chojniczanka Chojnice	L	L	L	W	W	D	D	W	W	L	D	W	L	W	W																			
GKS Tychy	W	W	D	D	W	D	W	D	D	W	W	W	D	L																				
Górnik Łęczna	W	L	L	W	D	W	W	W	D	W	L	L	W	W	W																			
Hutnik Kraków	D	W	W	W	D	W	L	D	L	L	W	L	L	W	L																			
Lechia Zielona Góra	D	D	W	L	D	W	L	W	L	W	L	D	L	W	W																			
Legia Warsaw II	L	L	W	L	W	L	L	L	W	W	D	L	W	W	W																			
Olimpia Grudziądz	L	D	D	W	W	L	W	D	L	W	W	D	W	L	L																			
Podhale Nowy Targ	W	D	L	L	D	W	W	W	L	W	D	D	D	D	D																			
Rekord Bielsko-Biała	D	W	W	L	L	L	W	W	W	L	D	L	D	L	L																			
Resovia Rzeszów	L	L	L	D	D	L	D	L	L	D	L	D	D	L	L																			
Sandecja Nowy Sącz	D	W	L	W	D	W	L	W	D	L	D	W	L	W	L																			
Sokół Kleczew	D	D	L	W	L	D	L	D	D	L	L	D	W	W	W																			
Stal Stalowa Wola	W	L	L	W	L	L	D	L	W	L	W	W	W	L	L																			
Śląsk Wrocław II	L	W	W	L	L	L	L	L	W	L	D	L	L	L	L																			
Świt Szczecin	L	L	L	L	D	D	W	L	L	W	L	D	L	D	W																			
Zawisza Bydgoszcz	D	L	W	W	W	W	D	D	D	L	L	L	W	W																				
Znicz Pruszków	W	W	W	L	D	W	W	D	W	W	W	W	W	L	D																			

Updated to match(es) played on 8 November 2026. Source: 90minut.pl
W = Win; D = Draw; L = Loss

== Promotion play-offs ==
The promotion play-offs will be played on 1–2 and 5–6 June 2027, between the teams that finish in 3rd, 4th, 5th and 6th place. The fixtures will be determined by final league position – the 3rd team of the regular season will play against the 6th team of the regular season, and the 4th team of the regular season will play against the 5th team of the regular season. The winner of the final match will be promoted to the I liga for the 2026–27 season. All matches will be played in the stadium of the team which finished in a higher position in the regular season.

Semi-finals; 1–2 June 2027
3
6
4
5

Final; 5–6 June 2027

== Relegation play-offs ==
The relegation play-offs will be played on 2, 5–6 and 9 June 2027. The semi-finals will be played over a single leg between the runners-up of each III liga group. The winner of each semi-final will advance to the final, which will be played over two legs against the 13th or 14th-placed II liga team. The winners of the final will earn or keep the right to compete in the II liga for the following season. The final matches will be hosted by the winners of the semi-finals.

Semi-finals; 2 June 2027
2 (Group I)
2 (Group IV)
2 (Group III)
2 (Group II)

Final; 5–6 and 9 June 2027
13
14

== Season statistics ==
=== Top goalscorers ===
As of 8 November 2026.

Rank	Player	Club	Goals
1	(Poland) Kacper Śpiewak	Sokół Kleczew	10
2	(Brazil) Marcinho	Podhale Nowy Targ	8
3	(Austria) Bekem Bicki	Legia Warsaw II	7
3	(Poland) Maksymilian Hebel	Stal Stalowa Wola	7
3	(Poland) Jakub Jeleń	Stal Stalowa Wola	7
3	(Poland) Bartłomiej Korbecki	Górnik Łęczna	7
3	(Latvia) Valērijs Šabala	Chojniczanka Chojnice	7
3	(Poland) Oskar Zawada	Hutnik Kraków	7
9	(Poland) Bartosz Florek	Hutnik Kraków	5
9	(Poland) Marcel Płocica	Sandecja Nowy Sącz	5
9	(Poland) Tymon Proczek	Znicz Pruszków	5
9	(Ukraine) Andriy Remenyuk	Avia Świdnik	5
9	(Poland) Krzysztof Ropski	Świt Szczecin	5

== Attendances ==
Pos	Team	Total	High	Low	Average	Change
1	Sandecja Nowy Sącz	50,588	8,006	6,535	7,227	+15.7%
2	Zawisza Bydgoszcz	26,887	4,980	2,450	3,361	n/a^{2}
3	GKS Tychy	21,109	3,968	2,593	3,016	−25.2%^{1}
4	Stal Stalowa Wola	15,441	2,500	1,650	2,206	−5.0%
5	Górnik Łęczna	11,054	3,610	1,101	1,579	−1.4%^{1}
6	Avia Świdnik	8,222	1,640	632	1,028	n/a^{2}
7	Chojniczanka Chojnice	8,086	1,422	526	1,011	+14.0%
8	Lechia Zielona Góra	8,948	1,000	948	994	n/a^{2}
9	Hutnik Kraków	6,210	995	485	776	−2.6%
10	Resovia Rzeszów	5,320	1,536	408	760	−15.2%
11	Znicz Pruszków	5,561	980	240	618	−19.7%^{1}
12	Świt Szczecin	3,912	704	374	559	+27.9%
13	Podhale Nowy Targ	3,881	900	150	485	−23.9%
14	Rekord Bielsko-Biała	3,036	700	270	434	−36.8%
15	Sokół Kleczew	3,190	570	100	354	−31.7%
16	Śląsk Wrocław II	1,659	539	116	207	−16.2%
17	Legia Warsaw II	1,370	350	100	171	n/a^{2}
18	Olimpia Grudziądz	167	105	62	84	−84.8%
	League total	184,641	8,006	62	1,378	+42.4%

Updated to games played on 8 November 2026.
Source: 90minut.pl
Notes:
1. Team played last season in I liga.
2. Team played last season in III liga.

== Number of teams by region ==
Number	Region	Team(s)
3	Lesser Poland Voivodeship	Hutnik Kraków, Podhale Nowy Targ and Sandecja Nowy Sącz
2	Kuyavian-Pomeranian Voivodeship	Zawisza Bydgoszcz and Olimpia Grudziądz
2	Lublin Voivodeship	Avia Świdnik and Górnik Łęczna
2	Masovian Voivodeship	Legia Warsaw II and Znicz Pruszków
2	Podkarpackie Voivodeship	Resovia and Stal Stalowa Wola
2	Silesian Voivodeship	GKS Tychy and Rekord Bielsko-Biała
1	Greater Poland Voivodeship	Sokół Kleczew
1	Lower Silesian Voivodeship	Śląsk Wrocław II
1	Lubusz Voivodeship	Lechia Zielona Góra
1	Pomeranian Voivodeship	Chojniczanka Chojnice
1	West Pomeranian Voivodeship	Świt Szczecin

== See also ==
- 2026–27 Ekstraklasa
- 2026–27 I liga
- 2026–27 III liga
- 2026–27 Polish Cup
- 2026 Polish Super Cup
