= 2026–27 III liga =

III liga
- Season: 2026–27
- Dates: 31 July 2026 – 30 May 2027

The 2026–27 III liga (also known as Betclic III liga for sponsorship reasons) is the 19th season of the fourth tier domestic division in the Polish football league system since its establishment in 2008 under its current name (III liga), and the tenth season under its current league division format. The league is operated by the Polish Football Association (PZPN).

The competition is contested by 72 clubs split geographically across four groups of 18 teams, with the winners of each group gaining promotion to the II liga. The season is played in a round-robin tournament format, culminating in promotion play-offs involving two second-placed III liga teams against II liga clubs that finished their season in 13th and 14th places.

== Changes from last season ==
The following teams have changed division since the 2025–26 season.

=== To III liga ===
Relegated from 2025–26 II liga	Promoted from 2025–26 IV liga			
Relegated from 2025–26 II liga	Group I	Group II	Group III	Group IV
▼ Zagłębie Sosnowiec (15th) ▼KKS 1925 Kalisz (16th) ▼ ŁKS Łódź II (17th)	▲ Pelikan Łowicz ▲KTS Weszło ▲ Mazovia Mińsk Mazowiecki ▲ Olimpia Zambrów ▲ Polonia Lidzbark Warmiński	▲ Chemik Bydgoszcz ▲ Gedania Gdańsk ▲ Grom Nowy Staw ▲ Kotwica Kórnik ▲ Bałtyk Koszalin	▲ Barycz Sułów ▲ Odra Bytom Odrzański ▲ Stilon Gorzów Wielkopolski ▲ Stal Brzeg ▲KS ROW 1964 Rybnik ▲ Raków Częstochowa II	▲ Hetman Zamość ▲ Wieczysta Kraków II ▲JKS Jarosław ▲AKS 1947 Busko-Zdrój ▲ Moravia Morawica

=== From III liga ===
Promoted to 2026–27 II liga	Relegated to 2026–27 IV liga			
Promoted to 2026–27 II liga	Group I	Group II	Group III	Group IV
▲ Legia Warsaw II (Group I) ▲ Zawisza Bydgoszcz (Group II) ▲ Lechia Zielona Góra (Group III) ▲ Avia Świdnik (Group IV)	▼GKS Wikielec ▼ Broń Radom ▼GKS Bełchatów ▼KS Wasilków ▼ Znicz Biała Piska	▼ Pogoń Szczecin II ▼ Pogoń Nowe Skalmierzyce ▼ Cartusia Kartuzy ▼ Tłuchowia Tłuchowo ▼ Wybrzeże Rewalskie Rewal	▼LZS Starowice Dolne ▼ Pniówek Pawłowice Śląskie	▼ Cracovia II ▼ Świdniczanka Świdnik ▼ Sparta Kazimierza Wielka
▲ Legia Warsaw II (Group I) ▲ Zawisza Bydgoszcz (Group II) ▲ Lechia Zielona Góra (Group III) ▲ Avia Świdnik (Group IV)	Withdrawn from the competition			
▲ Legia Warsaw II (Group I) ▲ Zawisza Bydgoszcz (Group II) ▲ Lechia Zielona Góra (Group III) ▲ Avia Świdnik (Group IV)			▼ Skra Częstochowa ▼ Górnik Zabrze II ▼ Słowianin Wolibórz ▼ Stal Jasień	▼ Stal Kraśnik

== Teams ==
The following teams are competing in the III liga for the 2026–27 season.

Group I	Group II	Group III	Group IV
Jagiellonia Białystok II; KS CK Troszyn; KTS Weszło; Lechia Tomaszów Mazowiecki; ŁKS Łomża; ŁKS Łódź II; Mazovia Mińsk Mazowiecki; Mławianka Mława; Olimpia Elbląg; Olimpia Zambrów; Pelikan Łowicz; Polonia Lidzbark Warmiński; Świt Nowy Dwór Mazowiecki; Warta Sieradz; Widzew Łódź II; Wigry Suwałki; Wisła Płock II; Ząbkovia Ząbki	Bałtyk Koszalin; Błękitni Stargard; Chemik Bydgoszcz; Elana Toruń; Flota Świnoujście; Gedania Gdańsk; Grom Nowy Staw; KKS 1925 Kalisz; Kluczevia Stargard; Kotwica Kórnik; Lech Poznań II; Lipno Stęszew; Noteć Czarnków; Polonia Środa Wielkopolska; Unia Swarzędz; Victoria Września; Wda Świecie; Wikęd Luzino	Barycz Sułów; Carina Gubin; Górnik Polkowice; Karkonosze Jelenia Góra; KS Goczałkowice-Zdrój; Miedź Legnica II; MKS Kluczbork; Odra Bytom Odrzański; Polonia Nysa; Raków Częstochowa II; ROW 1964 Rybnik; Sparta Katowice; Stal Brzeg; Stilon Gorzów Wielkopolski; Ślęza Wrocław; Warta Gorzów Wielkopolski; Zagłębie Lubin II; Zagłębie Sosnowiec	AKS 1947 Busko-Zdrój; Chełmianka Chełm; Czarni Połaniec; Hetman Zamość; JKS Jarosław; Korona Kielce II; KSZO Ostrowiec Świętokrzyski; Moravia Morawica; Naprzód Jędrzejów; Podlasie Biała Podlaska; Pogoń-Sokół Lubaczów; Siarka Tarnobrzeg; Sokół Kolbuszowa Dolna; Star Starachowice; Wieczysta Kraków II; Wisła Kraków II; Wisłoka Dębica; Wiślanie Skawina

== League tables ==
=== Group I ===
III liga Group I
- Season: 2026–27
- Dates: 31 July 2026 – 30 May 2027

Pos	Team	Pld	W	D	L	GF	GA	GD	Pts	Promotion
1	KTS Weszło	16	11	2	3	31	17	+14	35	Promotion to II liga
2	Wigry Suwałki	16	10	4	2	31	15	+16	34	Qualification for the promotion play-offs
3	Mazovia Mińsk Mazowiecki	16	9	3	4	39	29	+10	30	
4	Świt Nowy Dwór Mazowiecki	16	9	2	5	32	23	+9	29	
5	Warta Sieradz	16	8	4	4	28	22	+6	28	
6	Ząbkovia Ząbki	16	7	4	5	29	25	+4	25	
7	Wisła Płock II	16	7	4	5	30	28	+2	25	
8	Pelikan Łowicz	16	7	3	6	25	23	+2	24	
9	Olimpia Zambrów	16	7	3	6	33	32	+1	24	
10	ŁKS Łódź II	16	6	3	7	28	30	−2	21	
11	Olimpia Elbląg	16	6	3	7	21	24	−3	21	
12	Jagiellonia Białystok II	16	5	5	6	28	29	−1	20	
13	Widzew Łódź II	16	5	4	7	28	26	+2	19	
14	Polonia Lidzbark Warmiński	16	5	3	8	29	31	−2	18	
15	Lechia Tomaszów Mazowiecki	16	5	2	9	25	33	−8	17	Relegation to IV liga
16	Mławianka Mława	16	4	2	10	29	44	−15	14	Relegation to IV liga
17	KS CK Troszyn	16	3	5	8	19	34	−15	14	Relegation to IV liga
18	ŁKS Łomża	16	0	4	12	16	36	−20	4	Relegation to IV liga

Updated to match(es) played on 8 November 2026. Source: 90minut.pl
Rules for classification: 1. Points obtained in the entire series of matches; 2. Points obtained in head-to-head matches; 3. Goal difference in head-to-head matches; 4. Goal difference in head-to-head matches – away goals count double; 5. Goal difference in the entire series of matches; 6. Goals scored in the entire series of matches.

=== Group II ===
III liga Group II
- Season: 2026–27
- Dates: 31 July 2026 – 30 May 2027

Pos	Team	Pld	W	D	L	GF	GA	GD	Pts	Promotion
1	Polonia Środa Wielkopolska	16	11	4	1	43	21	+22	37	Promotion to II liga
2	Kluczevia Stargard	16	9	3	4	29	25	+4	30	Qualification for the promotion play-offs
3	Wikęd Luzino	16	9	2	5	41	26	+15	29	
4	Wda Świecie	16	8	5	3	26	22	+4	29	
5	Lech Poznań II	16	8	3	5	43	32	+11	27	
6	Błękitni Stargard	16	6	6	4	35	26	+9	24	
7	Unia Swarzędz	16	6	4	6	26	22	+4	22	
8	Bałtyk Koszalin	16	5	6	5	22	20	+2	21	
9	Noteć Czarnków	16	6	3	7	21	23	−2	21	
10	KKS 1925 Kalisz	16	4	8	4	19	21	−2	20	
11	Elana Toruń	16	5	5	6	24	27	−3	20	
12	Gedania Gdańsk	16	4	7	5	31	31	0	19	
13	Grom Nowy Staw	16	6	1	9	34	35	−1	19	
14	Chemik Bydgoszcz	16	4	6	6	26	31	−5	18	
15	Flota Świnoujście	16	5	3	8	19	32	−13	18	Relegation to IV liga
16	Lipno Stęszew	16	4	2	10	20	31	−11	14	Relegation to IV liga
17	Victoria Września	16	2	8	6	15	27	−12	14	Relegation to IV liga
18	Kotwica Kórnik	16	3	2	11	21	43	−22	11	Relegation to IV liga

Updated to match(es) played on 7 November 2026. Source: 90minut.pl
Rules for classification: 1. Points obtained in the entire series of matches; 2. Points obtained in head-to-head matches; 3. Goal difference in head-to-head matches; 4. Goal difference in head-to-head matches – away goals count double; 5. Goal difference in the entire series of matches; 6. Goals scored in the entire series of matches.

=== Group III ===
III liga Group III
- Season: 2026–27
- Dates: 31 July 2026 – 30 May 2027

Pos	Team	Pld	W	D	L	GF	GA	GD	Pts	Promotion
1	Zagłębie Sosnowiec	16	12	1	3	26	10	+16	37	Promotion to II liga
2	Sparta Katowice	16	11	3	2	31	10	+21	36	Qualification for the promotion play-offs
3	Odra Bytom Odrzański	16	9	4	3	17	11	+6	31	
4	Zagłębie Lubin II	16	7	6	3	29	22	+7	27	
5	KS ROW 1964 Rybnik	16	8	2	6	32	24	+8	26	
6	Barycz Sułów	16	7	3	6	25	22	+3	24	
7	Miedź Legnica II	17	7	2	8	36	31	+5	23	
8	Karkonosze Jelenia Góra	16	6	5	5	21	16	+5	23	
9	MKS Kluczbork	16	7	2	7	18	21	−3	23	
10	Górnik Polkowice	16	6	4	6	29	28	+1	22	
11	KS Goczałkowice-Zdrój	16	6	3	7	20	22	−2	21	
12	Stal Brzeg	16	5	4	7	29	24	+5	19	
13	Stilon Gorzów Wielkopolski	16	4	6	6	23	26	−3	18	
14	Carina Gubin	16	4	4	8	14	27	−13	16	
15	Ślęza Wrocław	16	4	2	10	23	35	−12	14	Relegation to IV liga
16	Warta Gorzów Wielkopolski	16	3	5	8	13	32	−19	14	Relegation to IV liga
17	Raków Częstochowa II	16	3	4	9	19	30	−11	13	Relegation to IV liga
18	Polonia Nysa	15	3	4	8	15	29	−14	13	Relegation to IV liga

Updated to match(es) played on 11 November 2026. Source: 90minut.pl
Rules for classification: 1. Points obtained in the entire series of matches; 2. Points obtained in head-to-head matches; 3. Goal difference in head-to-head matches; 4. Goal difference in head-to-head matches – away goals count double; 5. Goal difference in the entire series of matches; 6. Goals scored in the entire series of matches.

=== Group IV ===
III liga Group IV
- Season: 2026–27
- Dates: 1 August 2026 – 30 May 2027

Pos	Team	Pld	W	D	L	GF	GA	GD	Pts	Promotion
1	Chełmianka Chełm	16	12	4	0	27	7	+20	40	Promotion to II liga
2	KSZO Ostrowiec Świętokrzyski	16	8	5	3	27	14	+13	29	Qualification for the promotion play-offs
3	Hetman Zamość	16	8	5	3	32	24	+8	29	
4	Wisłoka Dębica	16	9	2	5	25	21	+4	29	
5	Czarni Połaniec	16	8	4	4	25	22	+3	28	
6	Naprzód Jędrzejów	16	8	3	5	33	31	+2	27	
7	Wisła Kraków II	16	7	4	5	21	20	+1	25	
8	Wiślanie Skawina	16	7	3	6	24	18	+6	24	
9	Star Starachowice	16	6	5	5	27	24	+3	23	
10	Siarka Tarnobrzeg	16	7	2	7	25	22	+3	23	
11	Wieczysta Kraków II	16	5	4	7	16	19	−3	19	
12	JKS Jarosław	16	5	3	8	32	30	+2	18	
13	AKS 1947 Busko-Zdrój	16	5	2	9	22	36	−14	17	
14	Sokół Kolbuszowa Dolna	16	3	7	6	16	20	−4	16	
15	Korona Kielce II	16	4	3	9	31	37	−6	15	Relegation to IV liga
16	Podlasie Biała Podlaska	16	3	4	9	12	27	−15	13	Relegation to IV liga
17	Moravia Morawica	16	3	3	10	19	29	−10	12	Relegation to IV liga
18	Pogoń-Sokół Lubaczów	16	3	3	10	19	32	−13	12	Relegation to IV liga

Updated to match(es) played on 8 November 2026. Source: 90minut.pl
Rules for classification: 1. Points obtained in the entire series of matches; 2. Points obtained in head-to-head matches; 3. Goal difference in head-to-head matches; 4. Goal difference in head-to-head matches – away goals count double; 5. Goal difference in the entire series of matches; 6. Goals scored in the entire series of matches.

== See also ==
- 2026–27 Ekstraklasa
- 2026–27 I liga
- 2026–27 II liga
- 2026–27 Polish Cup
- 2026 Polish Super Cup
