= Patryk Szwedzik =

Polish footballer

Personal information
- Full name: Patryk Szwedzik
- Date of birth: 2 November 2001 (age 25)
- Place of birth: Legnica, Poland
- Height: 1.85 m (6 ft 1 in)
- Position: Forward

Team information
- Current team: Ruch Chorzów
- Number: 21

Youth career
- 2011–2016: Miedź Legnica
- 2016–2017: Konfeks Legnica
- 2017–2019: GKS Katowice

Senior career*
Years	Team	Apps	(Gls)
2019–2023	GKS Katowice	68	(12)
2023–2025	Śląsk Wrocław	21	(1)
2023–2024	Śląsk Wrocław II	18	(11)
2024–2025	→ Chrobry Głogów (loan)	26	(5)
2025–	Ruch Chorzów	33	(14)

International career
2022	Poland U20	1	(1)
- * Club domestic league appearances and goals as of 14:43, 29 May 2026 (UTC)

Patryk Szwedzik (born 2 December 2001) is a Polish professional footballer who plays as a forward for I liga club Ruch Chorzów.

== Career statistics ==
As of match played 24 May 2026

Appearances and goals by club, season and competition
Club	Season	League			Polish Cup		Europe		Other		Total	
Club	Season	Division	Apps	Goals	Apps	Goals	Apps	Goals	Apps	Goals	Apps	Goals
GKS Katowice	2019–20	II liga	11	1	0	0	—		—		11	1
GKS Katowice	2020–21	I liga	12	1	1	0	—		—		13	1
GKS Katowice	2021–22	I liga	29	7	2	0	—		—		31	7
GKS Katowice	2022–23	I liga	16	3	2	0	—		—		18	3
GKS Katowice	Total		68	12	5	0	—		—		73	12
Śląsk Wrocław	2022–23	Ekstraklasa	9	0	0	0	—		—		9	0
Śląsk Wrocław	2023–24	Ekstraklasa	12	1	0	0	—		—		12	1
Śląsk Wrocław	Total		21	1	0	0	—		—		21	1
Śląsk Wrocław II	2022–23	II liga	6	4	—		—		—		6	4
Śląsk Wrocław II	2023–24	III liga, gr. III	12	7	0	0	—		—		12	7
Śląsk Wrocław II	Total		18	11	0	0	—		—		18	11
Chrobry Głogów (loan)	2024–25	I liga	26	5	1	0	—		—		27	5
Ruch Chorzów	2025–26	I liga	33	14	1	1	—		—		34	15
Career total			166	43	7	1	—		—		173	44
