= 2026–27 in Polish football =

Football in Poland
- Season: 2026–27

Men's football
- Polish Super Cup: Lech Poznań

2026–27 in Polish football
- Teams in Europe
- Lech Poznań; Górnik Zabrze; Jagiellonia Białystok; Raków Częstochowa; GKS Katowice
- Poland national team
- 2026–27 UEFA Nations League; UEFA Euro 2028 qualifying

The 2026–27 season will be the 102nd season of competitive football in Poland.

== Men's football ==
=== League competitions ===
==== Ekstraklasa ====
Pos	Team	Pld	W	D	L	GF	GA	GD	Pts	Qualification or relegation
1	Lech Poznań	13	10	2	1	34	13	+21	32	Qualification for the Champions League play-off round
2	Górnik Zabrze	14	9	4	1	23	12	+11	31	Qualification for the Champions League second qualifying round
3	Legia Warsaw	14	6	6	2	25	15	+10	24	Qualification for the Europa League second qualifying round
4	Pogoń Szczecin	13	7	3	3	20	15	+5	24	Qualification for the Conference League second qualifying round
5	Wisła Kraków	14	7	3	4	22	19	+3	24	
6	Zagłębie Lubin	14	6	5	3	18	17	+1	23	
7	Piast Gliwice	14	6	4	4	24	20	+4	22	
8	GKS Katowice	14	7	0	7	25	20	+5	21	
9	Jagiellonia Białystok	13	7	0	6	18	18	0	21	
10	Motor Lublin	14	5	4	5	22	24	−2	19	
11	Korona Kielce	14	5	3	6	14	21	−7	18	
12	Wisła Płock	13	4	3	6	14	21	−7	15	
13	Widzew Łódź	14	2	8	4	20	19	+1	14	
14	Radomiak Radom	14	4	2	8	17	29	−12	14	
15	Cracovia	14	3	3	8	16	23	−7	12	
16	Raków Częstochowa	14	4	0	10	23	31	−8	12	Relegation to I liga
17	Śląsk Wrocław	14	2	4	8	17	25	−8	10	Relegation to I liga
18	Wieczysta Kraków	14	2	2	10	18	28	−10	8	Relegation to I liga

Updated to match(es) played on 8 November 2026. Source: ekstraklasa.org 90minut.pl
Rules for classification: 1) Points; 2) Head-to-head points; 3) Head-to-head goal difference; 4) Goal difference; 5) Goals scored; 6) Number of wins; 7) Number of away wins; 8) Lower number of points based on yellow and red cards (red card = 3 points, yellow card = 1 point, sending-off = 3 points - including 1 point for first yellow card); 9) Fairplay ranking; 10) Draw.
(Note: Head-to-head record is used only after all the matches between the teams in question have been played)

==== I liga ====
Pos	Team	Pld	W	D	L	GF	GA	GD	Pts	Promotion or Relegation
1	Polonia Warsaw	14	7	4	3	23	15	+8	25	Promotion to Ekstraklasa
2	ŁKS Łódź	14	7	4	3	17	12	+5	25	Promotion to Ekstraklasa
3	Polonia Bytom	14	6	6	2	24	20	+4	24	Qualification for the promotion play-offs
4	Lechia Gdańsk	14	7	1	6	25	22	+3	22	Qualification for the promotion play-offs
5	Ruch Chorzów	14	6	4	4	17	14	+3	22	Qualification for the promotion play-offs
6	Bruk-Bet Termalica Nieciecza	14	6	4	4	22	20	+2	22	Qualification for the promotion play-offs
7	Pogoń Grodzisk Mazowiecki	14	6	3	5	20	14	+6	21	
8	Miedź Legnica	14	5	5	4	20	13	+7	20	
9	Warta Poznań	14	6	1	7	20	20	0	19	
10	Pogoń Siedlce	14	5	4	5	17	17	0	19	
11	Stal Mielec	14	5	4	5	19	27	−8	19	
12	Arka Gdynia	14	5	3	6	19	17	+2	18	
13	Stal Rzeszów	14	5	3	6	18	25	−7	18	
14	Chrobry Głogów	14	3	6	5	15	17	−2	15	
15	Podbeskidzie Bielsko-Biała	14	2	9	3	17	20	−3	15	
16	Puszcza Niepołomice	14	4	2	8	16	20	−4	14	Relegation to II liga
17	Unia Skierniewice	14	4	2	8	20	26	−6	14	Relegation to II liga
18	Odra Opole	14	3	3	8	11	21	−10	12	Relegation to II liga

Updated to match(es) played on 8 November 2026. Source: 1liga.org 90minut.pl
Rules for classification: 1) Points; 2) Head-to-head points; 3) Head-to-head goal difference; 4) Goal difference; 6) Goals scored; 7) Number of wins; 8) Number of away wins.
(Note: Head-to-head record is used only after all the matches between the teams in question have been played)

==== II liga ====
Pos	Team	Pld	W	D	L	GF	GA	GD	Pts	Promotion or Relegation
1	Znicz Pruszków	15	10	3	2	29	17	+12	33	Promotion to I liga
2	Górnik Łęczna	15	9	2	4	33	15	+18	29	Promotion to I liga
3	GKS Tychy	14	7	6	1	20	9	+11	27	Qualification for the promotion play-offs
4	Chojniczanka Chojnice	15	7	3	5	26	24	+2	24	Qualification for the promotion play-offs
5	Zawisza Bydgoszcz	14	6	4	4	26	20	+6	22	Qualification for the promotion play-offs
6	Legia Warsaw II	15	7	1	7	30	25	+5	22	Qualification for the promotion play-offs
7	Sandecja Nowy Sącz	15	6	4	5	23	20	+3	22	
8	Podhale Nowy Targ	15	5	7	3	26	24	+2	22	
9	Lechia Zielona Góra	15	6	4	5	24	26	−2	22	
10	Olimpia Grudziądz	15	6	4	5	19	22	−3	22	
11	Hutnik Kraków	15	6	3	6	24	22	+2	21	
12	Avia Świdnik	15	6	2	7	18	22	−4	20	
13	Stal Stalowa Wola	15	6	1	8	24	28	−4	19	Qualification for the relegation play-offs
14	Rekord Bielsko-Biała	15	5	3	7	20	19	+1	18	Qualification for the relegation play-offs
15	Sokół Kleczew	15	4	6	5	21	30	−9	18	Relegation to III liga
16	Świt Szczecin	15	3	4	8	19	32	−13	13	Relegation to III liga
17	Śląsk Wrocław II	15	3	1	11	22	33	−11	10	Relegation to III liga
18	Resovia Rzeszów	15	0	6	9	9	25	−16	6	Relegation to III liga

Updated to match(es) played on 8 November 2026. Source: 90minut.pl
Rules for classification: 1) Points; 2) Head-to-head points; 3) Head-to-head goal difference; 4) Goal difference; 6) Goals scored; 7) Number of wins; 8) Number of away wins.
(Note: Head-to-head record is used only after all the matches between the teams in question have been played)

==== III liga ====
===== Group 1 =====
Pos	Team	Pld	W	D	L	GF	GA	GD	Pts	Promotion
1	KTS Weszło	16	11	2	3	31	17	+14	35	Promotion to II liga
2	Wigry Suwałki	16	10	4	2	31	15	+16	34	Qualification for the promotion play-offs
3	Mazovia Mińsk Mazowiecki	16	9	3	4	39	29	+10	30	
4	Świt Nowy Dwór Mazowiecki	16	9	2	5	32	23	+9	29	
5	Warta Sieradz	16	8	4	4	28	22	+6	28	
6	Ząbkovia Ząbki	16	7	4	5	29	25	+4	25	
7	Wisła Płock II	16	7	4	5	30	28	+2	25	
8	Pelikan Łowicz	16	7	3	6	25	23	+2	24	
9	Olimpia Zambrów	16	7	3	6	33	32	+1	24	
10	ŁKS Łódź II	16	6	3	7	28	30	−2	21	
11	Olimpia Elbląg	16	6	3	7	21	24	−3	21	
12	Jagiellonia Białystok II	16	5	5	6	28	29	−1	20	
13	Widzew Łódź II	16	5	4	7	28	26	+2	19	
14	Polonia Lidzbark Warmiński	16	5	3	8	29	31	−2	18	
15	Lechia Tomaszów Mazowiecki	16	5	2	9	25	33	−8	17	Relegation to IV liga
16	Mławianka Mława	16	4	2	10	29	44	−15	14	Relegation to IV liga
17	KS CK Troszyn	16	3	5	8	19	34	−15	14	Relegation to IV liga
18	ŁKS Łomża	16	0	4	12	16	36	−20	4	Relegation to IV liga

Updated to match(es) played on 8 November 2026. Source: 90minut.pl
Rules for classification: 1. Points obtained in the entire series of matches; 2. Points obtained in head-to-head matches; 3. Goal difference in head-to-head matches; 4. Goal difference in head-to-head matches – away goals count double; 5. Goal difference in the entire series of matches; 6. Goals scored in the entire series of matches.

===== Group 2 =====
Pos	Team	Pld	W	D	L	GF	GA	GD	Pts	Promotion
1	Polonia Środa Wielkopolska	16	11	4	1	43	21	+22	37	Promotion to II liga
2	Kluczevia Stargard	16	9	3	4	29	25	+4	30	Qualification for the promotion play-offs
3	Wikęd Luzino	16	9	2	5	41	26	+15	29	
4	Wda Świecie	16	8	5	3	26	22	+4	29	
5	Lech Poznań II	16	8	3	5	43	32	+11	27	
6	Błękitni Stargard	16	6	6	4	35	26	+9	24	
7	Unia Swarzędz	16	6	4	6	26	22	+4	22	
8	Bałtyk Koszalin	16	5	6	5	22	20	+2	21	
9	Noteć Czarnków	16	6	3	7	21	23	−2	21	
10	KKS 1925 Kalisz	16	4	8	4	19	21	−2	20	
11	Elana Toruń	16	5	5	6	24	27	−3	20	
12	Gedania Gdańsk	16	4	7	5	31	31	0	19	
13	Grom Nowy Staw	16	6	1	9	34	35	−1	19	
14	Chemik Bydgoszcz	16	4	6	6	26	31	−5	18	
15	Flota Świnoujście	16	5	3	8	19	32	−13	18	Relegation to IV liga
16	Lipno Stęszew	16	4	2	10	20	31	−11	14	Relegation to IV liga
17	Victoria Września	16	2	8	6	15	27	−12	14	Relegation to IV liga
18	Kotwica Kórnik	16	3	2	11	21	43	−22	11	Relegation to IV liga

Updated to match(es) played on 7 November 2026. Source: 90minut.pl
Rules for classification: 1. Points obtained in the entire series of matches; 2. Points obtained in head-to-head matches; 3. Goal difference in head-to-head matches; 4. Goal difference in head-to-head matches – away goals count double; 5. Goal difference in the entire series of matches; 6. Goals scored in the entire series of matches.

===== Group 3 =====
Pos	Team	Pld	W	D	L	GF	GA	GD	Pts	Promotion
1	Zagłębie Sosnowiec	16	12	1	3	26	10	+16	37	Promotion to II liga
2	Sparta Katowice	16	11	3	2	31	10	+21	36	Qualification for the promotion play-offs
3	Odra Bytom Odrzański	16	9	4	3	17	11	+6	31	
4	Zagłębie Lubin II	16	7	6	3	29	22	+7	27	
5	KS ROW 1964 Rybnik	16	8	2	6	32	24	+8	26	
6	Barycz Sułów	16	7	3	6	25	22	+3	24	
7	Miedź Legnica II	17	7	2	8	36	31	+5	23	
8	Karkonosze Jelenia Góra	16	6	5	5	21	16	+5	23	
9	MKS Kluczbork	16	7	2	7	18	21	−3	23	
10	Górnik Polkowice	16	6	4	6	29	28	+1	22	
11	KS Goczałkowice-Zdrój	16	6	3	7	20	22	−2	21	
12	Stal Brzeg	16	5	4	7	29	24	+5	19	
13	Stilon Gorzów Wielkopolski	16	4	6	6	23	26	−3	18	
14	Carina Gubin	16	4	4	8	14	27	−13	16	
15	Ślęza Wrocław	16	4	2	10	23	35	−12	14	Relegation to IV liga
16	Warta Gorzów Wielkopolski	16	3	5	8	13	32	−19	14	Relegation to IV liga
17	Raków Częstochowa II	16	3	4	9	19	30	−11	13	Relegation to IV liga
18	Polonia Nysa	15	3	4	8	15	29	−14	13	Relegation to IV liga

Updated to match(es) played on 11 November 2026. Source: 90minut.pl
Rules for classification: 1. Points obtained in the entire series of matches; 2. Points obtained in head-to-head matches; 3. Goal difference in head-to-head matches; 4. Goal difference in head-to-head matches – away goals count double; 5. Goal difference in the entire series of matches; 6. Goals scored in the entire series of matches.

===== Group 4 =====
Pos	Team	Pld	W	D	L	GF	GA	GD	Pts	Promotion
1	Chełmianka Chełm	16	12	4	0	27	7	+20	40	Promotion to II liga
2	KSZO Ostrowiec Świętokrzyski	16	8	5	3	27	14	+13	29	Qualification for the promotion play-offs
3	Hetman Zamość	16	8	5	3	32	24	+8	29	
4	Wisłoka Dębica	16	9	2	5	25	21	+4	29	
5	Czarni Połaniec	16	8	4	4	25	22	+3	28	
6	Naprzód Jędrzejów	16	8	3	5	33	31	+2	27	
7	Wisła Kraków II	16	7	4	5	21	20	+1	25	
8	Wiślanie Skawina	16	7	3	6	24	18	+6	24	
9	Star Starachowice	16	6	5	5	27	24	+3	23	
10	Siarka Tarnobrzeg	16	7	2	7	25	22	+3	23	
11	Wieczysta Kraków II	16	5	4	7	16	19	−3	19	
12	JKS Jarosław	16	5	3	8	32	30	+2	18	
13	AKS 1947 Busko-Zdrój	16	5	2	9	22	36	−14	17	
14	Sokół Kolbuszowa Dolna	16	3	7	6	16	20	−4	16	
15	Korona Kielce II	16	4	3	9	31	37	−6	15	Relegation to IV liga
16	Podlasie Biała Podlaska	16	3	4	9	12	27	−15	13	Relegation to IV liga
17	Moravia Morawica	16	3	3	10	19	29	−10	12	Relegation to IV liga
18	Pogoń-Sokół Lubaczów	16	3	3	10	19	32	−13	12	Relegation to IV liga

Updated to match(es) played on 8 November 2026. Source: 90minut.pl
Rules for classification: 1. Points obtained in the entire series of matches; 2. Points obtained in head-to-head matches; 3. Goal difference in head-to-head matches; 4. Goal difference in head-to-head matches – away goals count double; 5. Goal difference in the entire series of matches; 6. Goals scored in the entire series of matches.

=== Cup competitions ===
==== Polish Cup ====
2 May 2027
16:00 CEST (UTC+02:00)

v
[ 90minut] [ Łączy nas piłka]

Stadion Narodowy, Warsaw

==== Polish Super Cup ====
16 July 2026
19:00 CEST (UTC+02:00)

Lech Poznań	3–1	Górnik Zabrze
Kozubal 27'; Ishak 47'; Rodríguez 69'	90minut.pl PZPN	Khlan 14'

Enea Stadion, Poznań
Attendance: 37,843
Referee: Damian Kos (Gdańsk)

== UEFA competitions ==
=== UEFA Champions League ===
==== Qualifying phase and play-off round ====
===== Second qualifying round =====
Team 1	Agg.	Team 2	1st leg	2nd leg
AGF (Denmark)	5–5 (4–3 p)	(Poland) Lech Poznań	1–4	4–1 (a.e.t.)
Fenerbahçe (Turkey)	2–1	(Poland) Górnik Zabrze	1–0	1–1

=== UEFA Europa League ===
==== Qualifying phase and play-off round ====
===== Third qualifying round =====
Team 1	Agg.	Team 2	1st leg	2nd leg
Lech Poznań (Poland)	6–0	(Faroe Islands) KÍ	1–0	5–0
Jagiellonia Białystok (Poland)	3–2	(Scotland) Rangers	2–1	1–1
Ferencváros (Hungary)	2–1	(Poland) Górnik Zabrze	1–0	1–1

===== Play-off round =====
Team 1	Agg.	Team 2	1st leg	2nd leg
Jagiellonia Białystok (Poland)	6–1	(Georgia (country)) Iberia 1999	4–0	2–1
Lech Poznań (Poland)	9–2	(Switzerland) Thun	7–0	2–2

==== League phase ====
===== Jagiellonia Białystok =====
Pos	Team	Pld	W	D	L	GF	GA	GD	Pts
27	(Spain) Celta Vigo	4	1	0	3	4	6	−2	3
28	(Italy) Milan	4	1	0	3	4	7	−3	3
29	(Poland) Jagiellonia Białystok	4	1	0	3	4	7	−3	3
30	(Czech Republic) Viktoria Plzeň	4	1	0	3	3	7	−4	3
31	(France) Marseille	4	1	0	3	2	6	−4	3

Updated to match(es) played on 5 November 2026. Source: UEFA
Rules for classification: League phase tiebreakers

Home team	Score	Away team
Olympiacos (Greece)	2–1	(Poland) Jagiellonia Białystok
Jagiellonia Białystok (Poland)	3–1	Ararat-Armenia
Jagiellonia Białystok (Poland)	0–3	(Belgium) Anderlecht
Levski Sofia (Bulgaria)	1–0	(Poland) Jagiellonia Białystok
Sunderland (England)	26 Nov	(Poland) Jagiellonia Białystok
Jagiellonia Białystok (Poland)	10 Dec	(England) Crystal Palace
Jagiellonia Białystok (Poland)	21 Jan	(France) Lyon
Viktoria Plzeň (Czech Republic)	28 Jan	(Poland) Jagiellonia Białystok

===== Lech Poznań =====
Pos	Team	Pld	W	D	L	GF	GA	GD	Pts
32	(Scotland) Celtic	4	1	0	3	6	11	−5	3
33	(Israel) Hapoel Be'er Sheva	4	0	1	3	1	8	−7	1
34	(Norway) Lillestrøm	4	0	1	3	2	10	−8	1
35	(Poland) Lech Poznań	4	0	1	3	2	12	−10	1
36	Ararat-Armenia	4	0	0	4	4	14	−10	0

Updated to match(es) played on 5 November 2026. Source: UEFA
Rules for classification: League phase tiebreakers

Home team	Score	Away team
Crystal Palace (England)	4–0	(Poland) Lech Poznań
Lech Poznań (Poland)	0–4	(Germany) Bayer Leverkusen
Lech Poznań (Poland)	1–1	(England) Sunderland
Benfica (Portugal)	3–1	(Poland) Lech Poznań
Union Saint-Gilloise (Belgium)	26 Nov	(Poland) Lech Poznań
Lech Poznań (Poland)	10 Dec	(Hungary) Ferencváros
Lech Poznań (Poland)	21 Jan	(Portugal) Torreense
OFI (Greece)	28 Jan	(Poland) Lech Poznań

=== UEFA Conference League ===
==== Qualifying phase and play-off round ====
===== Second qualifying round =====
Team 1	Agg.	Team 2	1st leg	2nd leg
Raków Częstochowa (Poland)	7–1	(Malta) Valletta	3–1	4–0
Žilina (Slovakia)	3–4	(Poland) GKS Katowice	2–1	1–3

===== Third qualifying round =====
Team 1	Agg.	Team 2	1st leg	2nd leg
Hapoel Tel Aviv (Israel)	3–2	(Poland) GKS Katowice	2–0	1–2
Raków Częstochowa (Poland)	1–0	(Sweden) Hammarby IF	0–0	1–0

===== Play-off round =====
Team 1	Agg.	Team 2	1st leg	2nd leg
Górnik Zabrze (Poland)	3–7	(France) Monaco	2–3	1–4
Hajduk Split (Croatia)	5–4	(Poland) Raków Częstochowa	2–2	3–2 (a.e.t.)

== National teams ==
=== Poland national football team ===
==== UEFA Nations League ====
===== Group 4 =====
Pos	Team	Pld	W	D	L	GF	GA	GD	Pts	Promotion or qualification	(Sweden)	(Bosnia and Herzegovina)	(Poland)	(Romania)
1	Sweden (P)	5	4	1	0	10	5	+5	13	Promotion to League A	—	3–2	3–1	2–1
2	Bosnia and Herzegovina (Q)	5	2	2	1	8	6	+2	8	Qualification for promotion play-offs	1–1	—	1–0	17 Nov
3	Poland (Z)	5	1	1	3	8	6	+2	4		17 Nov	0–0	—	6–0
4	Romania (Z)	5	1	0	4	5	14	−9	3	Qualification for relegation play-offs	0–1	2–4	2–1	—

Updated to match(es) played on 5 October 2026. Source: UEFA
(P) Promoted; (Q) Qualified for the phase indicated; (Z) Cannot be promoted

25 September 2026 2026–27 UEFA Nations League	Poland	0–0	Bosnia and Herzegovina	Warsaw, Poland
20:45 CEST (UTC+2)		Report		Stadium: Stadion Narodowy; Attendance: 46,775; Referee: Anastasios Papapetrou (Greece)

28 September 2026 2026–27 UEFA Nations League	Sweden	3–1	Poland	Solna, Sweden
20:45 CEST (UTC+2)	Nygren 8'; Ayari 64'; Gyökeres 72'	Report	Szymański 43'	Stadium: Nationalarenan; Attendance: 24,637; Referee: Javier Alberola Rojas (Spain)

2 October 2026 2026–27 UEFA Nations League	Poland	6–0	Romania	Warsaw, Poland
20:45 CEST (UTC+2)	Lewandowski 24' (pen.), 47', 86'; Ghiţă 49' (o.g.); Zieliński 62'; Bednarek 66'	Report		Stadium: Stadion Narodowy; Attendance: 51,054; Referee: Urs Schnyder (Switzerland)

5 October 2026 2026–27 UEFA Nations League	Bosnia and Herzegovina	1–0	Poland	Zenica, Bosnia and Herzegovina
20:45 CEST (UTC+2)	Bašić 84'	Report		Stadium: Bilino Polje Stadium; Attendance: 11,700; Referee: Jérémie Pignard (France)

14 November 2026 2026–27 UEFA Nations League	Romania	2–1	Poland	Bucharest, Romania
20:45 CET (UTC+1)	Cicâldău 68'; Man 72'	Report	Reguła 82'	Stadium: Arena Națională; Attendance: 45,827; Referee: Sebastian Gishamer (Austria)

17 November 2026 2026–27 UEFA Nations League	Poland	v	Sweden	Warsaw, Poland
20:45 CET (UTC+1)		Report		Stadium: Stadion Narodowy; Referee: Felix Zwayer (Germany)
