= Tomasz Copik =

Polish footballer

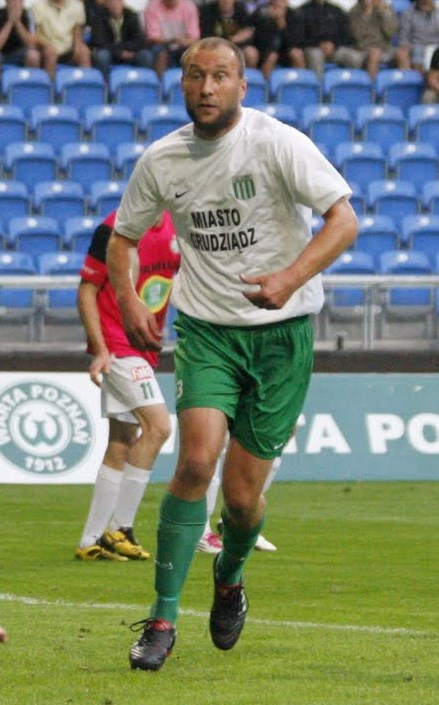
- Copik with Olimpia Grudziądz in 2011

Personal information
- Full name: Tomasz Copik
- Date of birth: 5 April 1978 (age 48)
- Place of birth: Knurów, Poland
- Height: 1.90 m (6 ft 3 in)
- Position: Midfielder

Team information
- Current team: Odra Opole II (assistant)

Youth career
- Jedność 32 Przyszowice

Senior career*
Years	Team	Apps	(Gls)
1996	Gwarek Zabrze		
1997–1998	Górnik Zabrze	1	(0)
1998–1999	Naprzód Rydułtowy		
1999	Polonia Bytom		
2000–2002	Odra Opole		
2002	Pogoń Szczecin	8	(0)
2003–2004	Górnik Łęczna	28	(2)
2004–2005	Szczakowianka Jaworzno	29	(3)
2006	KSZO Ostrowiec	30	(3)
2007–2008	Odra Opole	59	(8)
2009	GKS Jastrzębie	27	(7)
2010–2011	MKS Kluczbork	37	(5)
2011	Olimpia Grudziądz	5	(0)
2012–2015	Odra Opole	70	(8)
2015–2016	Orzeł Źlinice	28	(9)

Managerial career
- 2015–?: Odra Opole II
- 2015–2019: Odra Opole (U19)
- 2017–2019: Orzeł Źlinice
- * Club domestic league appearances and goals

Tomasz Copik (born 5 April 1978) is a Polish professional football manager and former player who is currently the assistant manager of Odra Opole II.

== Career ==
=== Club career ===
In December 2010, he joined MKS Kluczbork. In June 2011, he moved to Olimpia Grudziądz.

== Coaching career ==
In summer 2015 Copik was appointed coach of Odra Opole's U19 team alongside Piotr Plewnia and was also set to continue as head coach of the club's reserve team. In January 2016, Copik became a part of Jan Furlepa's staff for Odra Opole's first team beside his duties with the reserve and U19 teams.

On 28 August 2019, Copik was promoted to the first team as Piotr Plewnia's assistant coach, leaving his position as head coach at the club Orzeł Źlinice, which he had occupied since 2017 alongside his coaching duties at Odra Opole.

On 30 September 2024, following the dismissal of Radosław Sobolewski, Copik took on the role of caretaker head coach. He returned to his previous duties the following day after the appointment of Jarosław Skrobacz.

At the end of the 2024–25 season, Copik was moved to the position of assistant head coach of Odra's reserve team.

== Honours ==
Odra Opole

- III liga Opole–Silesian: 2012–13
