= Myroslav Mazur =

Ukrainian footballer

Personal information
- Full name: Myroslav Valentynovych Mazur
- Date of birth: 11 August 1998 (age 28)
- Place of birth: Kyiv, Ukraine
- Height: 1.94 m (6 ft 4 in)
- Position: Centre-back

Team information
- Current team: Miedź Legnica
- Number: 78

Youth career
- 2008–2016: Dynamo Kyiv

Senior career*
Years	Team	Apps	(Gls)
2016–2017	Dynamo-2 Kyiv	2	(0)
2017	Bukovyna Chernivtsi	4	(0)
2017–2018	Arsenal Kyiv	0	(0)
2018–2019	Vorskla Poltava	0	(0)
2019	→ Sfîntul Gheorghe (loan)	17	(2)
2020	Umeå FC	20	(2)
2021	Jagiellonia Białystok	3	(0)
2021	Jagiellonia Białystok II	4	(2)
2022–2023	Östersund	55	(4)
2024	Žalgiris	21	(0)
2025–2026	Chrobry Głogów	44	(9)
2026–	Miedź Legnica	0	(0)
- * Club domestic league appearances and goals as of 21:01, 31 May 2026 (UTC)

Myroslav Valentynovych Mazur (Ukrainian: Мирослав Валентинович Мазур; born 11 August 1998) is a Ukrainian professional footballer who plays as a centre-back for I liga club Miedź Legnica.

== Career ==
Before the second half of the 2016–17 season, after playing for the reserves of Dynamo Kyiv, Mazur signed for Bukovyna in the Ukrainian second division, where he made four league appearances.

In early 2019, Mazur was loaned to Moldovian side Sfîntul Gheorghe, where he made 20 appearances and scored two goals and was called up to represent Ukraine U21.

Before the 2020 season, he signed for Swedish side Umeå FC.

On 2 February 2021, Mazur moved to Jagiellonia Białystok in Poland.

On 18 March 2022, Mazur signed for Swedish Superettan club Östersund.

== Honours ==
Sfîntul Gheorghe

- Moldovan Cup runner-up: 2018–19

Žalgiris

- A Lyga: 2024
