= Marek Gołębiewski =

Polish football manager

Personal information
- Date of birth: 18 May 1980 (age 46)
- Place of birth: Piaseczno, Poland
- Height: 1.86 m (6 ft 1 in)
- Position: Forward

Team information
- Current team: Mławianka Mława (manager)

Senior career*
Years	Team	Apps	(Gls)
1997–1999	KS Piaseczno		
1999–2003	Gwardia Warsaw		
2003	Świt Nowy Dwór Mazowiecki	6	(1)
2004–2005	Radomiak Radom	9	(0)
2005	Ruch Wysokie Mazowieckie		
2005	Drwęca Nowe Miasto Lubawskie		
2006	Ruch Wysokie Mazowieckie		
2007	Odysseas Androutsos	15	(5)
2007–2009	PAONE	57	(17)
2009	Ródos		
2010	Rouf		
2010–2011	Sokół Sokółka	32	(6)
2011–2014	Pilica Białobrzegi		
2014–2017	Sparta Jazgarzew		

Managerial career
- 2011–2012: Pilica Białobrzegi (youth)
- 2012–2019: Escola Varsovia (youth)
- 2020: Ząbkovia Ząbki
- 2020–2021: Skra Częstochowa
- 2021: Legia Warsaw II
- 2021: Legia Warsaw
- 2022: Legia Warsaw II
- 2022–2023: Chrobry Głogów
- 2025: Zagłębie Sosnowiec
- 2026–: Mławianka Mława
- * Club domestic league appearances and goals

Marek Gołębiewski (born 18 May 1980) is a Polish professional football manager and former player who is currently in charge of III liga club Mławianka Mława. He previously managed teams such as Skra Częstochowa, Legia Warsaw, Chrobry Głogów and Zagłębie Sosnowiec.

== Club career ==
Gołębiewski started his career with KS Piaseczno in 1997. Then he played for Gwardia Warsaw, Świt Nowy Dwór Mazowiecki, Radomiak Radom, Ruch Wysokie Mazowieckie, Drwęca Nowe Miasto Lubawskie, Sokół Sokółka, Pilica Białobrzegi and several Greek clubs. He played six games for Świt for in the Ekstraklasa, scoring one goal in the 2003–04 season in a 3–1 loss against Legia Warsaw. He ended his career in 2017 playing for Sparta Jazgarzew.

== Managerial career ==
=== Early career ===
On 6 August 2020, Gołębiewski became the coach of the third-tier Skra Częstochowa. He made his debut in the Polish Cup match against Stal Stalowa Wola, which Skra lost 1–3. On 17 May 2021, his employment contract was terminated by mutual consent, after the team went winless in nine straight games. On 24 June 2021, he became the coach of Legia Warsaw II in the fourth division.

=== Legia Warsaw ===
Gołębiewski assumed the role of Legia Warsaw's manager on 26 October 2021, following the dismissal of Czesław Michniewicz. At that time, Legia was positioned fifteenth in the Ekstraklasa and was leading their UEFA Europa League group stage. His inaugural match in charge was a Polish Cup game against Świt Szczecin, which Legia won 1–0. However, in his first Ekstraklasa fixture on 31 October 2021, Legia suffered a 0–2 loss to Pogoń Szczecin. On 4 November 2021, Gołębiewski experienced a heavy defeat in his UEFA Europa League debut, with Legia losing 1–4 to Napoli at home.

On 9 December 2021, Legia was eliminated from the UEFA Europa League after a 0–1 loss to Spartak Moscow, which left them in fourth place in their group. Subsequently, on 13 December 2021, Legia announced that Gołębiewski had resigned following a 0–1 defeat to Wisła Płock, which saw the team drop to the bottom of the Ekstraklasa table.

=== Legia Warsaw II ===
In January 2022, Gołębiewski returned to coach Legia Warsaw's reserves. Although the club did not make an official announcement, he was listed in the Legia II squad on the club's official website.

=== Chrobry Głogów ===
On 9 June 2022, he was announced as the new manager of I liga side Chrobry Głogów. On 7 August 2023, following three defeats in three opening rounds of the 2023–24 season, Gołębiewski was relieved of his duties.

=== Zagłębie Sosnowiec ===
On 16 June 2025, Gołębiewski was appointed as manager of II liga club Zagłębie Sosnowiec, signing a two-year deal. He left the club by mutual consent on 7 September 2025, hours after a 0–1 loss to Warta Poznań. During his tenure, he led Zagłębie to one win, three draws and four losses in all competitions.

=== Mławianka Mława ===
On 3 January 2026, Gołębiewski was hired as the new manager of III liga club Mławianka Mława.

== Managerial statistics ==
As of match played 12 September 2026

Managerial record by team and tenure
Team	Nat	From	To	Record							
Team	Nat	From	To	G	W	D	L	GF	GA	GD	Win %
Skra Częstochowa	(Poland)	6 August 2020	17 May 2021	33	14	5	14	44	37	+7	42.42
Legia Warsaw II	(Poland)	24 June 2021	26 October 2021	14	7	4	3	29	16	+13	50.00
Legia Warsaw	(Poland)	26 October 2021	13 December 2021	11	3	0	8	9	19	−10	27.27
Legia Warsaw II	(Poland)	1 January 2022	18 June 2022	22	12	5	5	44	30	+14	54.55
Chrobry Głogów	(Poland)	19 June 2022	7 August 2023	39	13	10	16	51	69	−18	33.33
Zagłębie Sosnowiec	(Poland)	1 July 2025	7 September 2025	8	1	3	4	8	18	−10	12.50
Mławianka Mława	(Poland)	3 January 2026	Present	25	8	4	13	43	49	−6	32.00
Total				152	58	31	63	228	238	−10	38.16

== Honours ==
=== As a player ===
Pilica Białobrzegi

- IV liga Masovia South: 2012–13

=== As a manager ===
Legia Warsaw

- Polish Cup (Masovia regionals): 2021–22
