= Horst Panic =

Polish football player and manager (1938–2025)

- Horst Panic at Varta Namysłów in 1998

Personal information
- Date of birth: 12 July 1938
- Place of birth: Bobrek, Poland
- Date of death: 7 November 2025 (aged 87)
- Position: Forward

Youth career
- Zryw Chorzów

Senior career*
Years	Team	Apps	(Gls)
1955–1965	Bielawianka Bielawa		
1965–1970	Górnik Wałbrzych		

Managerial career
- 1974–1978: Górnik Wałbrzych (assistant manager)
- 1978–1979: Górnik Wałbrzych
- 1980–1984: Górnik Wałbrzych
- 1984–1986: Zagłębie Sosnowiec
- 1987–1991: Zagłębie Wałbrzych
- 1991–1994: Chrobry Głogów
- 1994–1995: Amica Wronki
- 1995: Lechia Dzierżoniów
- 1995–1996: Polonia Świdnica
- 1998: Varta Namysłów
- LKS Bestwina
- Drzewiarz Jasienica
- * Club domestic league appearances and goals

Horst Panic (12 July 1938 – 7 November 2025) was a Polish football player and manager. After spending his professional playing career with Górnik Wałbrzych, he started his managerial career with the same club, leading them to a historic promotion to the Ekstraklasa in 1983, earning a "best coach" award in a Słowo Polskie plebiscite. He later went on to manage various other clubs, primarily in Lower Silesia.

== Early life ==
Horst Panic was born on 12 July 1938 in Bobrek, a present-day suburb of Bytom, southern Poland.

== Playing career ==
Panic began his football career at Zryw Chorzów, and from 1955 he played for Bielawianka Bielawa. From 1965 to 1970, he played for Górnik Wałbrzych, with whom he competed in the Polish Second Division with over 70 appearances for them. He played as a forward.

== Managerial career ==
After his playing career, Panic remained in the sport and worked as a coach. In the 1974–75 season, he became an assistant to Stanisław Stachura at Górnik Wałbrzych, then playing in the Third Division. From 1975 to 1978, he assisted Stanisław Świerk and secured promotion to the Second Division in 1976. In the 1978–79 season, he became the first team manager of the Wałbrzych team, but was dismissed after the autumn round.

He returned to the manager's position in the spring round of the 1980–81 season, and in 1983 he led Górnik to the Ekstraklasa for the first time in the club's history, considered a historic success. After the autumn round (half-way point of the season), his team even led the league, and ultimately finished the season in 6th place. These successes earned Panic the title of Best Coach of 1983 in the "Słowo Polskie" plebiscite.

After the end of the successful 1983–84 season, he moved to Zagłębie Sosnowiec. With Zagłębie, he finished 5th in the First Division in the 1984–85 season and left after the autumn round of the 1985–86 season after relegation to the third tier.

In the spring of 1987, he managed the other team in Wałbrzych and Górnik's fierce rivals, the Third Division Zagłębie Wałbrzych; from the 1990–91 season a Second Division team after winning promotion.

From 1991 to 1994, he coached Chrobry Głogów at the Second and Third Division levels, and from 1995, the Second Division Amica Wronki for less than half a season, but was dismissed before the season's end, which nonetheless ended with the team's promotion to the First Division.

In May 1995, he became the manager of Lechia Dzierżoniów, but failed to keep the team in the Second Division. In the 1995–96 season, he managed the Third Division Polonia Świdnica. He also had a short stint at Varta Namysłów in 1998.

He ended his career as a coach at amateur clubs LKS Bestwina and Drzewiarz Jasienica.

== Death and legacy ==
Panic died on 7 November 2025, at the age of 87. His stories about Polish football are said to have been the inspiration for the Polish cult film Piłkarski poker.
