= Rafał Szwed =

Polish footballer

Personal information
- Date of birth: 18 July 1973 (age 53)
- Place of birth: Sokołów Podlaski, Poland
- Height: 1.92 m (6 ft 4 in)
- Position: Defender

Senior career*
Years	Team	Apps	(Gls)
1991–1995	Podlasie Sokołów Podlaski		
1995–1996	Motor Lublin		
1996–1997	Sokół Tychy	18	(0)
1997–1999	Stomil Olsztyn	40	(3)
1999	Ruch Chorzów	8	(0)
2000	MKS Mława		
2000	Górnik Zabrze	6	(2)
2000–2002	Stomil Olsztyn	43	(3)
2002	Okęcie Warsaw		
2003–2004	Polonia Warsaw	31	(4)
2004–2005	Widzew Łódź	30	(6)
2006	Radomiak Radom	23	(2)
2006	OKS 1945 Olsztyn		
2007	Unia Janikowo	2	(0)
2008–2010	Start Otwock		
2011–2012	Mrągowia Mrągowo	4	(0)
2013	Fortuna Gągławki		

International career
1999	Poland	1	(0)

Managerial career
- 2010–2011: DKS Dobre Miasto
- 2011–2012: Mrągowia Mrągowo (player-manager)
- 2013: Fortuna Gągławki (player-manager)
- * Club domestic league appearances and goals

Rafał Szwed (born 18 July 1973) is a Polish former professional footballer who played as a defender.

Szwed has made one appearance for the Poland national team.

== Honours ==
Start Otwock

- IV liga Masovia: 2007–08
