= Kelechukwu Ibe-Torti =

Footballer (born 2002)

Personal information
- Full name: Kelechukwu Ebenezer Ibe-Torti
- Date of birth: 26 January 2002 (age 24)
- Place of birth: Abuja, Nigeria
- Height: 1.74 m (5 ft 9 in)
- Positions: Midfielder; winger

Team information
- Current team: Chrobry Głogów
- Number: 7

Youth career
- –2019: Escola Varsovia

Senior career*
Years	Team	Apps	(Gls)
2019–2020	Escola Varsovia	4	(0)
2020–2025	ŁKS Łódź	45	(1)
2020–2025	ŁKS Łódź II	34	(9)
2023–2024	→ Resovia (loan)	23	(1)
2025	Stal Stalowa Wola	14	(5)
2025–	Chrobry Głogów	30	(4)

International career
2022–2023	Poland U20	5	(0)
- * Club domestic league appearances and goals as of 21:00, 31 May 2026 (UTC)

Kelechukwu Ebenezer Ibe-Torti (born 26 January 2002) is a professional footballer who plays as a midfielder or winger for I liga club Chrobry Głogów. Born in Nigeria, he was a Poland youth international.

== Early life ==
Born in Abuja, Nigeria, Ibe-Torti moved to Warsaw, Poland, at the age of twelve when his mother accepted a diplomatic job in the country. He remained in the country after his mother returned to Nigeria.

== Club career ==
After making his first senior competitive appearances with Escola Varsovia, Ibe-Torti moved to Polish second-tier side ŁKS Łódź in 2020, helping the club achieve promotion to Ekstraklasa in 2023. He made his top flight debut on 21 July that year, coming on as a substitute in a 3–0 away loss against Legia Warsaw.

On 31 August 2023, Ibe-Torti joined I liga side Resovia on a season-long loan.

On 11 January 2025, he left ŁKS permanently to join another second division club Stal Stalowa Wola on a six-month contract, with an option for a further year.

On 10 July 2025, Ibe-Torti signed a two-year deal with I liga Chrobry Głogów.

== International career ==
He is eligible to play internationally for Nigeria and Poland, after obtaining Polish citizenship in August 2021.

In 2019, he was included in the provisional squads for the 2019 U-17 Africa Cup of Nations and the 2019 FIFA U-17 World Cup for Nigeria U17s, but did not make the final rosters.

In May 2022, Ibe-Torti received his first call-up to the Poland U20 team, and made his debut in 0–1 Elite League away win against Italy on 7 June that year.

== Personal life ==
Ibe-Torti has regarded Neymar as his football idol.

== Honours ==
Escola Varsovia

- Regional league Warsaw I: 2019–20

ŁKS Łódź

- I liga: 2022–23

ŁKS Łódź II

- III liga, group I: 2022–23
- IV liga Łódź: 2020–21
