= Piotr Plewnia =

Polish footballer

Personal information
- Date of birth: 29 May 1977 (age 49)
- Place of birth: Opole, Poland
- Height: 1.81 m (5 ft 11 in)
- Position: Midfielder

Team information
- Current team: Odra Opole (caretaker manager)

Youth career
- Odra Opole

Senior career*
Years	Team	Apps	(Gls)
1996–1997	Odra Opole		
1997–1998	GKS Katowice	8	(0)
1998–1999	Odra Opole		
1999–2000	Skalnik Tarnów		
2000–2002	Odra Opole		
2002–2003	Tłoki Gorzyce	27	(2)
2003–2005	Polonia Warsaw	19	(1)
2005	Widzew Łódź	20	(2)
2005–2007	Odra Opole	17	(0)
2007	Polonia Bytom	18	(1)
2008–2012	GKS Katowice	100	(5)
2012	Odra Opole	6	(0)
2014	Silesius Kotórz Mały		

Managerial career
- 2015–2018: Odra Opole (U19)
- 2018: Odra Opole (caretaker)
- 2019: Odra Opole (caretaker)
- 2021–2022: Odra Opole
- 2023–2024: Chrobry Głogów
- 2026: Odra Opole (caretaker)
- 2026: Odra Opole II
- 2026–: Odra Opole (caretaker)
- * Club domestic league appearances and goals

Piotr Plewnia (born 29 May 1977) is a Polish professional football manager and former player who is currently the caretaker manager of I liga club Odra Opole.

== Career ==
=== Coaching career ===
Retiring at the end of 2012, Plewnia returned to his former club GKS Katowice, as a youth coach for the player from 1996. On 19 December 2013, he was then appointed assistant coach of Odra Opole. In 2015, Plewnia was also coaching the club's U19 team alongside Tomasz Copik. On 5 May 2018, he was appointed interim head coach following the release of Mirosław Smyła. Plewnia was in charge for two games, losing the first and winning the last, before Mariusz Rumak was hired as new head coach and therefore, Plewnia continued in his role as assistant coach.

On 24 August 2019, Plewnia was appointed head coach once again after Rumak was fired. This time, Plewnia was in charge for the rest of 2019. Out of 16 games, he won 6, lost 7 and drew 3 before Dietmar Brehmer was hired as new head coach from January 2020, with Plewnia continuing at the club in his role as an assistant coach.

On 17 August 2023, Plewnia was announced as the new manager of I liga side Chrobry Głogów, who at the time were placed bottom of the table, with no points gained in the first four rounds of the 2023–24 season. After spending the majority of the season in last place, Chrobry eventually finished in 12th. On 20 November 2024, he was sacked by the club following a series of poor results.

Plewnia joined fifth-tier side Małapanew Ozimek as an assistant in January 2025. On 6 September 2025, he returned to Odra Opole, taking on the role of assistant under head coach Jarosław Skrobacz. He was named caretaker head coach after Skrobacz's sacking on 2 March 2026. He led Odra to five wins, three draws and three losses during his third temporary stint. On 1 June 2026, Odra announced Plewnia would not be appointed on a permanent basis for the following season.

On 29 June 2026, he replaced Adam Berbelicki as the head coach of Odra Opole's reserve team. After the sacking of Łukasz Tomczyk, Plewnia was re-appointed as Odra's manager on a caretaker basis on 27 October 2026.

== Managerial statistics ==
As of match played 6 November 2026

Managerial record by team and tenure
Team	From	To	Record							
Team	From	To	G	W	D	L	GF	GA	GD	Win %
Odra Opole (caretaker)	5 May 2018	14 May 2018	2	1	0	1	4	5	−1	50.00
Odra Opole (caretaker)	24 August 2019	23 December 2019	16	6	3	7	16	19	−3	37.50
Odra Opole	16 March 2021	17 October 2022	65	22	16	27	84	101	−17	33.85
Chrobry Głogów	17 August 2023	20 November 2024	48	14	12	22	46	72	−26	29.17
Odra Opole (caretaker)	2 March 2026	1 June 2026	11	5	3	3	13	11	+2	45.45
Odra Opole II	29 June 2026	27 October 2026	14	14	0	0	52	10	+42	100.00
Odra Opole (caretaker)	27 October 2026	Present	3	1	0	2	5	9	−4	33.33
Total			159	63	34	62	230	217	+13	39.62
