= Łukasz Becella =

Polish football manager

Personal information
- Date of birth: 31 October 1978 (age 48)

Team information
- Current team: Chrobry Głogów (manager)

Managerial career
- Years: Team
- –2009: Sparta Miejska Górka
- 2010–2013: Śląsk Wrocław (ME)
- 2022–2023: Siarka Tarnobrzeg
- 2024–: Chrobry Głogów

Łukasz Becella (born 31 October 1978) is a Polish professional football manager who is the manager of I liga club Chrobry Głogów.

== Managerial career ==
During the 2008–09 season, Becella was the manager of IV liga club Sparta Miejska Górka, where he remained until May 2009. In 2010, he was appointed head coach of Śląsk Wrocław's Młoda Ekstraklasa side. After Młoda Ekstraklasa was disbanded in 2013, Becella held roles such as assistant coach under Tadeusz Pawłowski and head of Śląsk's scouting department, while simulteanously working as an assistant of the Poland national under-19 team under Rafał Janas. He was dismissed in October 2015.

On 5 February 2016, he was hired as head of scouting department at fellow Ekstraklasa side Pogoń Szczecin. He left the club by mutual consent on 15 June 2018.

He continued his coaching career as an assistant at Odra Opole, Zagłębie Lubin, Lech Poznań, and Raków Częstochowa (in the latter two, in addition to his assistant role, he also served as an analyst coach).

On 29 August 2022, Becella was appointed head coach of II liga club Siarka Tarnobrzeg. On 12 April 2023, he was dismissed. In October 2023, he joined Wisła Płock's staff as an assistant under Dariusz Żuraw, with whom he worked previously at Lech Poznań and Zagłębie Lubin.

On 20 November 2024, it was announced that he would be the new head coach of I liga side Chrobry Głogów.

== Managerial statistics ==
As of match played 20 November 2026

Managerial record by team and tenure
Team	From	To	Record							
Team	From	To	G	W	D	L	GF	GA	GD	Win %
Siarka Tarnobrzeg	29 August 2022	12 April 2023	18	4	5	9	18	27	−9	22.22
Chrobry Głogów	20 November 2024	Present	71	26	20	25	94	87	+7	36.62
Total			89	30	25	34	112	114	−2	33.71

== Honours ==
Individual

- I liga Coach of the Month: October 2025
