= Maciej Stolarczyk =

Polish footballer and manager

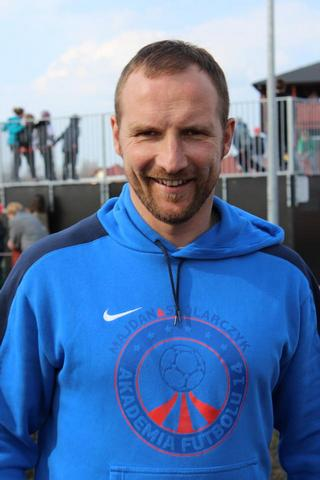
- Stolarczyk in 2012

Personal information
- Date of birth: 15 January 1972 (age 54)
- Place of birth: Słupsk, Poland
- Height: 1.84 m (6 ft 0 in)
- Position: Defender

Youth career
- Gryf Słupsk

Senior career*
Years	Team	Apps	(Gls)
1990–1999	Pogoń Szczecin		
1999–2001	Widzew Łódź	32	(0)
2001–2002	Pogoń Szczecin	21	(2)
2002–2007	Wisła Kraków	102	(11)
2007–2008	GKS Bełchatów	24	(1)

International career
1994–2005	Poland	8	(0)

Managerial career
- 2010: Pogoń Szczecin
- 2016–2017: Poland U20
- 2018–2019: Wisła Kraków
- 2020: Poland U19
- 2020: Poland U17
- 2020–2022: Poland U21
- 2022–2023: Jagiellonia Białystok
- 2025: Górnik Łęczna
- * Club domestic league appearances and goals

Maciej Stolarczyk (born 15 January 1972 in Słupsk) is a Polish professional football manager and former player who played as a defender. He was most recently in charge of Górnik Łęczna.

== Playing career ==
Stolarczyk made eight appearances for the Poland national team.

== Managerial career ==
In 2010, Stolarczyk became the head coach of Pogoń Szczecin. On 18 June 2018, Stolarczyk signed a one-year contract to become the manager of Wisła Kraków.

After initially taking charge of the U19 and U17 squads, on 15 October 2020 he was promoted to manage Poland U21. On 14 June 2022, after failing to qualify for the UEFA Under-21 Euro 2023, he was relieved of his duties. During his tenure, the U21 squad recorded seven wins, three draws and three losses.

On the same day, he was announced as the new manager of Ekstraklasa club Jagiellonia Białystok. On 4 April 2023, having led the club to six wins and twelve draws in 26 league games, Stolarczyk was dismissed.

On 17 June 2025, Stolarczyk was announced as the new manager of I liga club Górnik Łęczna, signing a season-long deal with an option for another year. He was dismissed on 30 September, two days after a 2–0 loss to Chrobry Głogów, Górnik's sixth defeat in 12 games under Stolarczyk.

== Managerial statistics ==
As of match played 28 September 2025

Managerial record by team and tenure
Team	From	To	Record							
Team	From	To	G	W	D	L	GF	GA	GD	Win %
Pogoń Szczecin	17 August 2010	9 November 2010	14	5	2	7	21	19	+2	35.71
Poland U20	7 July 2016	13 June 2017	8	4	1	3	12	12	+0	50.00
Wisła Kraków	18 June 2018	14 November 2019	54	17	10	27	83	92	−9	31.48
Poland U19	1 March 2020	25 June 2020	0	0	0	0	0	0	+0	—
Poland U17	25 June 2020	15 October 2020	0	0	0	0	0	0	+0	—
Poland U21	15 October 2020	14 June 2022	13	7	3	3	36	12	+24	53.85
Jagiellonia Białystok	14 June 2022	4 April 2023	28	7	12	9	38	38	+0	25.00
Górnik Łęczna	1 July 2025	30 September 2025	12	0	6	6	14	29	−15	0.00
Total			129	40	34	55	204	202	+2	31.01

== Honours ==
Wisła Kraków

- Ekstraklasa: 2002–03, 2003–04, 2004–05
- Polish Cup: 2002–03
