= Grzegorz Szoka =

Polish football manager (born 1986)

Personal information
- Date of birth: 4 October 1986 (age 40)
- Place of birth: Pruszków, Poland
- Height: 1.80 m (5 ft 11 in)
- Position: Defender

Team information
- Current team: ŁKS Łódź (manager)

Youth career
- Znicz Pruszków

Senior career*
Years	Team	Apps	(Gls)
2005–2006	Znicz Pruszków		
2006–2008	Tur Jaktorów		
2008	Ursus Warsaw		
2009	Piast Piastów		
2009–2010	Ursus Warsaw		
2011	Znicz Pruszków II		

Managerial career
- 2017–2018: Legia Warsaw U14
- 2018–2019: Legia Warsaw U17
- 2019–2022: Legia Warsaw U19
- 2023: Chrobry Głogów (caretaker)
- 2024–2025: Znicz Pruszków
- 2025–: ŁKS Łódź
- * Club domestic league appearances and goals

Grzegorz Szoka (born 4 October 1986) is a Polish professional football manager and former player who played as a defender. He currently manages I liga club ŁKS Łódź.

== Managerial statistics ==
As of match played 20 November 2026

Managerial record by team and tenure
Team	From	To	Record							
Team	From	To	G	W	D	L	GF	GA	GD	Win %
Chrobry Głogów (caretaker)	7 August 2023	17 August 2023	1	0	0	1	1	3	−2	0.00
Znicz Pruszków	14 June 2024	9 May 2025	32	11	10	11	44	44	+0	34.38
ŁKS Łódź	11 November 2025	Present	34	16	11	7	51	37	+14	47.06
Total			67	27	21	19	96	84	+12	40.30
