= Jakub Lis =

Polish footballer

Personal information
- Date of birth: 14 January 2002 (age 24)
- Place of birth: Poznań, Poland
- Height: 1.78 m (5 ft 10 in)
- Position: Defender

Team information
- Current team: Chrobry Głogów
- Number: 28

Youth career
- –2015: Biały Orzeł Koźmin Wielkopolski
- 2015–2016: Lech Poznań
- 2017–2019: Pogoń Szczecin

Senior career*
Years	Team	Apps	(Gls)
2019–2026	Pogoń Szczecin II	61	(4)
2022–2024	→ Motor Lublin (loan)	43	(3)
2024–2026	Pogoń Szczecin	17	(0)
2026–	Chrobry Głogów	10	(1)
- * Club domestic league appearances and goals as of 21:02, 31 May 2026 (UTC)

Jakub Lis (born 14 January 2002) is a Polish professional footballer who plays as a defender for I liga club Chrobry Głogów.

== Career ==
=== Youth career ===
Lis started his youth career in Biały Orzeł Koźmin Wielkopolski. During the 2015–16 season, he joined Lech Poznań's youth system. In 2017, he made the move to Pogoń Szczecin's academy, where he spent the rest of his youth career.

=== Pogoń Szczecin ===
Lis made his debut for Pogoń's reserve team on 1 August 2020, during a 1–5 away victory over Nielba Wągrowiec. He scored his first goal for the team in the 77th minute of a 0–2 away victory with KP Chemik Police on 31 October. On 20 October 2021, he made his debut in UEFA Youth League in a 4–0 away loss to Deportivo de La Coruña's youth team. Overall, before his loan to II liga club Motor Lublin, he made 49 appearances for Pogoń II and scored three goals.

==== Loan to Motor Lublin ====
On 28 July 2022, he joined II liga club Motor Lublin on a year-long loan. In his new team, he played as a defender, defensive and offensive midfielder and as a winger. He was assigned with squad number 73. He made his debut there in a 2–0 away loss to Górnik Polkowice on 30 July 2022, during which he came off the bench in the 61st minute, replacing Leszek Jagodziński. He scored his first goal for Motor on 24 February 2022, in the 79th minute of a 3–1 home rematch against Górnik. During the 2022–23 season, Lis played in 22 matches, scoring three goals.

His loan was extended in July 2023 for a further year. He made his I liga debut during a 3–2 home victory over Zagłębie Sosnowiec on 21 July. Lis made his first I liga start in the following month, on 6 August, in a 1–1 draw against GKS Katowice. Throughout that season, he made 25 appearances without scoring a goal.

==== First-team breakthrough ====
On 4 June 2024, he returned from the loan and was given squad number 17. His contract with Pogoń was prolonged by two years with an option for a further twelve months. On 10 August 2024, Lis made his Ekstraklasa debut in a 1–0 home victory over Stal Mielec, coming off the bench in the 83rd minute to replace Linus Wahlqvist. The following day, he played a full-time match with Wda Świecie for Pogoń's reserve team.

In total, he made 17 appearances for Pogoń's senior team, all in the Ekstraklasa.

=== Chrobry Głogów ===
On 18 February 2026, Lis joined second-tier club Chrobry Głogów on a deal until June 2028.

== Honours ==
Pogoń Szczecin II

- Polish Cup (West Pomerania regionals): 2021–22
