= Marcin Matysiak =

Polish football manager (born 1983)

Personal information
- Date of birth: 2 September 1983 (age 43)
- Place of birth: Poland
- Position: Midfielder

Team information
- Current team: Legia Warsaw II (manager)

Senior career*
Years	Team	Apps	(Gls)
–2010	Pogoń-Ekolog Zduńska Wola		
2013–2015	MKS Zduńska Wola		

Managerial career
- 2010–2011: Pogoń-Ekolog Zduńska Wola
- LKS Kobierzyce
- Diament Zduńska Wola
- 2020–2023: ŁKS Łódź II
- 2024: ŁKS Łódź
- 2025: Znicz Pruszków
- 2026–: Legia Warsaw II
- * Club domestic league appearances and goals

Marcin Matysiak (born 2 September 1983) is a Polish professional football manager and former player who is currently the manager of II liga club Legia Warsaw II.

== Playing career ==
Matysiak spent the entirety of his football career in lower divisions, and made 21 III liga appearances for Pogoń-Ekolog Zduńska Wola in his last season on professional level. He returned to playing in 2013, joining MKS Zduńska Wola.

== Managerial career ==
=== Early years ===
Following retirement at the end of the 2009–10 season, he took charge of Pogoń-Ekolog for one year. In 2012, he became head coach of regional league club LKS Kobierzyce for an undisclosed time.

He continued his coaching career managing Łódzkie Football Association's youth teams, as well as Diament Zduńska Wola of which he is the chairman. In 2017, he joined IV liga club Warta Sieradz's staff as an assistant.

=== ŁKS Łódź II ===
On 24 June 2020, after spending several years managing ŁKS Łódź's under-16 team, Matysiak was appointed manager of ŁKS Łódź II, who at the time were competing in IV liga Łódź.

In his first year in charge, ŁKS' reserve side won their IV liga group with a record of 31 wins, 6 draws and 1 loss, obtaining promotion to III liga. This was followed by a seventh-place finish in the 2021–22 season, and another promotion after topping the group I at the end of the 2022–23 campaign.

He left his role on 17 October 2023 to join the newly appointed Piotr Stokowiec's senior team coaching staff as an assistant.

=== ŁKS Łódź ===
On 20 February 2024, after Stokowiec's dismissal, Matysiak was promoted to the role of manager of ŁKS. Following two losses to Pogoń Szczecin and Stal Mielec, ŁKS recorded their first win under Matysiak on 3 March, defeating Puszcza Niepołomice 3–2 at home. They would claim two more victories before their relegation to I liga was confirmed on 4 May, following a 1–2 home loss to title contenders Śląsk Wrocław. On 23 May, ŁKS announced Matysiak rejected the opportunity to continue as manager, and he later moved to a coordinator role within ŁKS' academy.

On 7 January 2025, Matysiak re-joined ŁKS's first-team coaching staff as an assistant under manager Jakub Dziółka. On 25 March 2025, he moved back to his previous role in the academy.

=== Znicz Pruszków ===
On 16 June 2025, Matysiak was revealed as the new manager of I liga club Znicz Pruszków. On 13 August 2025, he was dismissed after losing the first four matches of the season.

=== Legia Warsaw II ===
Having spent the previous two months working as a coordinator for Warta Sieradz's academy, Matysiak was announced as the new manager of II liga newcomers Legia Warsaw II on 25 June 2026.

== Managerial statistics ==
As of match played 10 August 2025

Managerial record by team and tenure
Team	From	To	Record							
Team	From	To	G	W	D	L	GF	GA	GD	Win %
Pogoń-Ekolog Zduńska Wola	1 July 2010	24 June 2011	34	14	10	10	57	37	+20	41.18
ŁKS Łódź II	24 June 2020	17 October 2023	121	72	26	23	290	143	+147	59.50
ŁKS Łódź	20 February 2024	25 May 2024	14	4	2	8	20	35	−15	28.57
Znicz Pruszków	1 July 2025	13 August 2025	4	0	0	4	5	14	−9	0.00
Legia Warsaw II	1 July 2026	Present	0	0	0	0	0	0	+0	—
Total			173	90	38	45	372	229	+143	52.02

== Honours ==
ŁKS Łódź II

- III liga, group I: 2022–23
- IV liga Łódź: 2020–21
