= Jakub Grič =

Slovak footballer

Personal information
- Full name: Jakub Grič
- Date of birth: 5 July 1996 (age 30)
- Place of birth: Prešov, Slovakia
- Height: 1.80 m (5 ft 11 in)
- Positions: Centre-back; defensive midfielder

Team information
- Current team: Chrobry Głogów
- Number: 8

Youth career
- –2011: Odeva Lipany
- 2011–2013: Zemplín Michalovce

Senior career*
Years	Team	Apps	(Gls)
2013–2020	Zemplín Michalovce	139	(3)
2018	→ Sandecja Nowy Sącz (loan)	6	(0)
2020–2022	Spartak Trnava	60	(1)
2022–2023	Dynamo České Budějovice	11	(0)
2023–2024	Wisła Płock	28	(3)
2025–	Chrobry Głogów	42	(4)

International career
2012–2013	Slovakia U17	15	(0)
2014	Slovakia U18	5	(0)
2014–2015	Slovakia U19	3	(0)
- * Club domestic league appearances and goals as of 20:58, 31 May 2026 (UTC)

Jakub Grič (born 5 July 1996) is a Slovak professional footballer who plays as a centre-back or defensive midfielder for I liga club Chrobry Głogów.

== Club career ==
=== Zemplín Michalovce ===
Grič won the 2014–15 DOXXbet liga with Zemplín Michalovce, earning the club its first promotion to the top tier of Slovak football.

He made his Fortuna Liga debut for Michalovce in the starting line-up against AS Trenčín, on 18 July 2015.

=== Spartak Trnava ===
In July 2020, Grič had signed with Spartak Trnava, citing contention at signing with a club, with a notable name at home and abroad. Grič was of interest for Spartak on the grounds of his past performances and usefulness on different defensive positions.

=== Dynamo České Budějovice ===
In July 2022, Grič had signed with Czech side Dynamo České Budějovice.

=== Wisła Płock ===
On 3 August 2023, Grič made his return to Polish football, having previously played in the top division for Sandecja Nowy Sącz in 2018, by signing a one-year deal with I liga side Wisła Płock. He left the club at the end of his contract in June 2024.

=== Chrobry Głogów ===
On 4 February 2025, Grič joined another I liga club Chrobry Głogów on a five-month deal, with a one-year extension option.

== International career ==
Grič was first recognised in a senior national team nomination on 16 March 2022 by Štefan Tarkovič as an alternate ahead of four UEFA Nations League fixtures against Belarus, Azerbaijan and Kazakhstan scheduled in first two weeks of June 2022.

== Honours ==
Zemplín Michalovce

- 2. Liga: 2014–15

Spartak Trnava

- Slovak Cup: 2021–22
