= Ireneusz Mamrot =

Polish footballer and manager (born 1970)

Personal information
- Date of birth: 13 December 1970 (age 55)
- Place of birth: Trzebnica, Poland
- Height: 1.75 m (5 ft 9 in)
- Position: Midfielder

Team information
- Current team: Sandecja Nowy Sącz (manager)

Senior career*
Years	Team	Apps	(Gls)
1987–1991	Polonia Trzebnica		
1991–1992	Pogoń Oleśnica		
1992–1996	Polonia Trzebnica		
1996	Polar Wrocław		
1997	Rokita Brzeg Dolny		
1997–2000	KP Brzeg Dolny		
2000–2004	Polonia Trzebnica		
2004	Dąbroczanka Pępowo		
2005	Pogoń Oleśnica		
2005–2009	KS Łozina		
2010	Polonia Trzebnica	1	(0)
2012	Błysk Kuźniczysko		

Managerial career
- 2001–2004: Polonia Trzebnica
- 2004–2009: Wulkan Wrocław
- 2009–2010: Polonia Trzebnica
- 2010–2017: Chrobry Głogów
- 2017–2019: Jagiellonia Białystok
- 2020: Arka Gdynia
- 2021: ŁKS Łódź
- 2021: Jagiellonia Białystok
- 2023: Górnik Łęczna
- 2024–2025: Miedź Legnica
- 2025–2026: Stal Mielec
- 2026–: Sandecja Nowy Sącz
- * Club domestic league appearances and goals

Ireneusz Mamrot (born 13 December 1970) is a Polish professional football manager and former player who is currently in charge of II liga club Sandecja Nowy Sącz.

== Managerial career ==
Mamrot coached Polish I liga side Chrobry Głogów from 2010 to 2017. He won the III liga Dolnośląsko-lubuska group in 2011 and the II liga west group in 2014, guiding Chrobry from the fourth to second division in 4 years. In June 2017 Mamrot became the new head coach for Jagiellonia Białystok. Despite early success, he was eventually dismissed on 5 December 2019.

On 9 May 2020, he became the new head coach of Arka Gdynia. He didn't stay at Arka for long, as on 16 December 2020 he was sacked.

On 7 March 2021, he was announced as the new head coach of ŁKS Łódź. He was released from his duties on 1 June 2021 after a series of poor results, unappealing playing style, losing the dressing room and ŁKS dropping down the table further and further from automatic promotion.

On 4 June 2021, Mamrot was once again announced as the head coach of Jagiellonia Białystok. He was sacked on 23 December 2021.

On 26 February 2023, Mamrot made his return to managing and took charge of I liga side Górnik Łęczna, replacing Marcin Prasoł. Górnik enjoyed a good start to the 2023–24 campaign, topping the table after matchday 8 and remaining undefeated for the first 12 games of the season. On 11 December 2023, after only winning once in the last ten games across all competitions, Mamrot left the club by mutual consent, with a record of 11 wins, 14 draws and 8 losses.

On 8 April 2024, he was revealed as the new manager of second-division club Miedź Legnica, signing a deal until the end of the 2024–25 season. On 9 March 2025, he was relieved of his duties as head coach after a disappointing start to the year, with the club 4th in the table.

On 30 September 2025, Mamrot was appointed as the new head coach of I liga club Stal Mielec, signing a contract until June 2026. After avoiding relegation and finishing in 14th place, his contract was not extended for the following season.

On 5 October 2026, Mamrot took charge of third-tier side Sandecja Nowy Sącz.

== Managerial statistics ==
As of match played 24 May 2026

Managerial record by team and tenure
Team	From	To	Record							
Team	From	To	G	W	D	L	GF	GA	GD	Win %
Polonia Trzebnica	1 January 2009	16 December 2010	67	44	12	11	150	70	+80	65.67
Chrobry Głogów	16 December 2010	12 June 2017	236	100	65	71	356	256	+100	42.37
Jagiellonia Białystok	12 June 2017	8 December 2019	108	51	23	34	161	135	+26	47.22
Arka Gdynia	10 May 2020	16 December 2020	30	14	8	8	50	34	+16	46.67
ŁKS Łódź	7 March 2021	1 June 2021	13	5	3	5	15	15	+0	38.46
Jagiellonia Białystok	4 June 2021	23 December 2021	20	6	6	8	25	34	−9	30.00
Górnik Łęczna	26 February 2023	11 December 2023	33	11	14	8	34	37	−3	33.33
Miedź Legnica	8 April 2024	9 March 2025	33	16	9	8	62	36	+26	48.48
Stal Mielec	30 September 2025	30 June 2026	23	7	4	12	36	38	−2	30.43
Sandecja Nowy Sącz	5 October 2026	Present	0	0	0	0	0	0	+0	—
Total			563	254	144	165	889	655	+234	45.12

== Honours ==
Polonia Trzebnica

- Regional league Wrocław: 2002–03

Wulkan Wrocław

- Regional league Wrocław: 2006–07
- Klasa A Wrocław I: 2005–06
- Klasa B Wrocław XI: 2004–05

Chrobry Głogów

- II liga West: 2013–14
- III liga Lower Silesian – Lubusz: 2010–11
- Polish Cup (Lower Silesia regionals): 2010–11
- Polish Cup (Legnica regionals): 2010–11

Individual

- Ekstraklasa Coach of the Month: February 2018
- I liga Coach of the Month: October 2024
