= Mławianka Mława =

Polish football club

- Full name: Miejski Klub Sportowy; Mławianka Mława
- Founded: 1923; 103 years ago
- Ground: Stadion Miejski im. Ireny Szewińskiej
- Capacity: 1,550
- Chairman: vacant
- Manager: Marek Gołębiewski
- League: III liga, group I
- 2025–26: III liga, group I, 12th of 18
Home colours

MKS Mławianka Mława is a Polish football club based in Mława. The club competes in group I of the III liga.

Between 15 May 1997 and 29 October 2010, the club was called MKS Mława, temporarily dropping Mławianka from their name.

The crest used under the MKS Mława name

== Fans ==
The club has a small number of active supporters. The newest is called Mławska Wiara who also support Legia Warszawa and have good relations with fans of KS Łomianki. The older group Młoda Horda, support Lechia Gdańsk, and have good relations with fans of Mazur Pisz. The two groups have a bitter rivalry with each other.

All fans have major rivalries with Wkra Żuromin and MKS Ciechanów

== Honours ==
- III liga, group I
  - Champions: 2003–04

== Players ==
=== Current squad ===
As of 12 September 2024

Note: Flags indicate national team as defined under FIFA eligibility rules; some limited exceptions apply. Players may hold more than one non-FIFA nationality.

No.	Pos.	Nation	Player
1	GK	POL	Kacper Jureczko (on loan from Raków Częstochowa)
2	DF	UKR	Ivan Gurenko
3	DF	POL	Aleks Iwański
4	DF	POL	Kacper Wojtyszyn
6	DF	BRA	Duilio
7	MF	POL	Kacper Zielski
8	FW	ANG	Odilon
9	FW	ERI	Ezana Kahsay (on loan from Podlasie Biała Podlaska)
10	MF	POL	Michał Stryjewski
11	FW	POL	Mateusz Stryjewski
14	MF	UKR	Stanislav Greben
15	MF	POL	Piotr Karwowski
16	MF	POL	Sebastian Kurowski

No.	Pos.	Nation	Player
17	MF	POL	Aleksander Olczak
18	MF	POL	Sylwester Rogalski
19	DF	POL	Mateusz Markowicz
20	MF	POL	Adam Stefański
21	MF	UKR	Oleksandr Masalov
22	GK	POL	Piotr Piotrowski
23	DF	POL	Maciej Kmiecik
25	MF	UKR	Kyrylo Ovsiannikov
27	DF	POL	Jakub Rutkowski
28	MF	POL	Damian Kwapiński
29	MF	POL	Jakub Tworek
—	DF	POL	Hubert Derlatka

=== Out on loan ===
Note: Flags indicate national team as defined under FIFA eligibility rules; some limited exceptions apply. Players may hold more than one non-FIFA nationality.

No. / Pos. / Nation / Player; — / MF / POL / Wiktor Bryks (at Olimpia Olsztynek until 30 June 2025)	No. / Pos. / Nation / Player; — / FW / POL / Antoni Chmielewski (at Olimpia Olsztynek until 30 June 2025)

=== Notable players ===
Players who have played in a top national division

- Aka Adek Mba
- Maxwell Kalu
- Rafał Szwed

== See also ==
- Football in Poland
- List of football teams
