= Jarosław Skrobacz =

Polish football manager

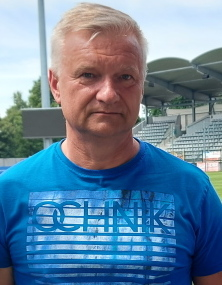
- Skrobacz in 2021

Personal information
- Date of birth: 11 August 1967 (age 59)
- Place of birth: Wodzisław Śląski, Poland

Managerial career
- Years: Team
- 2010–2011: Odra Wodzisław Śląski (caretaker)
- 2011: Odra Wodzisław Śląski
- 2011–2013: GKS Katowice (assistant)
- 2013: Naprzód Rydultowy
- 2013–2015: Pniówek Pawłowice
- 2016–2020: GKS Jastrzębie
- 2020–2021: Miedź Legnica
- 2021–2023: Ruch Chorzów
- 2024: Podbeskidzie Bielsko-Biała
- 2024–2026: Odra Opole
- 2026: Stal Stalowa Wola

Jarosław Skrobacz (born 11 August 1967) is a Polish professional football manager who was most recently in charge of II liga club Stal Stalowa Wola.

== Career ==
In 2016, he was appointed manager of Polish side GKS Jastrzębie, and won consecutive promotions with the Silesian side, from fourth to second division. In 2021, he was appointed manager of then-third division side Ruch Chorzów. With Skrobacz in charge, Ruch achieved a similar feat to GKS Jastrzębie under Skrobacz's tenure, making a step up from II liga to I liga in 2022, and to Ekstraklasa in 2023, marking the club's return to the top flight after a six-year absence.

Following a poor start to the 2023–24 campaign, with the team placed 17th in the table after achieving only one win in thirteen Ekstraklasa games, Skrobacz left Ruch on 6 November 2023.

On 1 March 2024, Skrobacz was appointed manager of I liga side Podbeskidzie Bielsko-Biała, signing a contract until the end of 2024–25 season. At the time of his appointment, his new team was placed second-last in the league table, five points away from safety with 13 games left in the season. Podbeskidzie was unable to save themselves from relegation, and Skrobacz left the club on 17 June 2024.

On 1 October 2024, he became the manager of another second division outfit Odra Opole, signing a one-year deal with an option for another year. His final game as Odra manager was a 2–0 home defeat to Stal Mielec on 1 March 2026. The next day, the club announced that Skrobacz had departed with immediate effect. He left Odra in fourteenth place in the league.

On 17 July 2026, third-tier side Stal Stalowa Wola announced Skrobacz as their new manager. He led Stal in nine matches, with a record of two wins, one draw and six losses. He was relieved of his duties on 15 September 2026.

== Managerial statistics ==
As of match played 12 September 2026

Managerial record by team and tenure
Team	From	To	Record							
Team	From	To	G	W	D	L	GF	GA	GD	Win %
Odra Wodzisław Śląski (caretaker)	24 September 2010	1 December 2010	9	5	2	2	9	5	+4	55.56
Odra Wodzisław Śląski	28 January 2011	3 June 2011	15	2	2	11	13	34	−21	13.33
Naprzód Rydułtowy	15 July 2013	9 September 2013	7	0	2	5	8	19	−11	0.00
Pniówek Pawłowice	9 September 2013	4 May 2015	65	31	13	21	115	87	+28	47.69
GKS Jastrzębie	4 May 2016	6 July 2020	152	74	42	36	253	157	+96	48.68
Miedź Legnica	30 July 2020	14 June 2021	35	13	12	10	49	40	+9	37.14
Ruch Chorzów	24 June 2021	6 November 2023	86	38	28	20	118	88	+30	44.19
Podbeskidzie Bielsko-Biała	1 March 2024	17 June 2024	13	1	3	9	9	28	−19	7.69
Odra Opole	1 October 2024	2 March 2026	50	12	15	23	45	73	−28	24.00
Stal Stalowa Wola	17 July 2026	15 September 2026	9	2	1	6	14	20	−6	22.22
Total			441	178	120	143	633	551	+82	40.36

== Honours ==
Pniówek Pawłowice

- Polish Cup (Silesia regionals): 2013–14
- Polish Cup (Tychy regionals): 2013–14

GKS Jastrzębie

- II liga: 2017–18
- III liga, group III: 2016–17
- Polish Cup (Silesia regionals): 2015–16
