= Chrobry Głogów =

Polish association football club

- Full name: Chrobry Głogów S.A.
- Nicknames: Pomarańczowo-Czarni (The Orange and Blacks)
- Founded: 1946; 80 years ago
- Ground: Stadion GOS
- Capacity: 2,817
- Chairman: Dariusz Kubiak
- Manager: Łukasz Becella
- League: I liga
- 2025–26: I liga, 4th of 18
- Website: www.chrobry-glogow.pl
Home colours	Away colours

Chrobry Głogów (Polish pronunciation: [ˈxrɔbrɨ ˈɡwɔɡuf]) is a Polish football club based in Głogów, Poland. It was founded in 1946. The team's official colors are blue, orange, black and green. Chrobry currently competes in I liga, the second tier of Polish league football. The club's name commemorates Polish King Bolesław I the Brave (Polish: Bolesław I Chrobry), who ruled Poland from 992 to 1025.

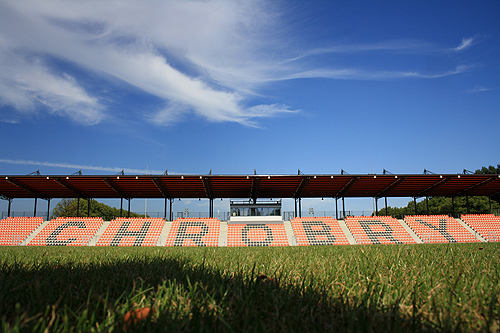
Stadion GOS

== Players ==
=== Current squad ===
As of 5 November 2026

Note: Flags indicate national team as defined under FIFA eligibility rules; some limited exceptions apply. Players may hold more than one non-FIFA nationality.

No.	Pos.	Nation	Player
1	GK	POL	Krzysztof Wróblewski
5	MF	POL	Radosław Bąk
6	DF	POL	Beniamin Czajka
7	MF	POL	Kelechukwu Ibe-Torti
8	DF	SVK	Jakub Grič
9	MF	POL	Mateusz Ozimek
10	MF	POL	Yegor Sharabura (on loan from Śląsk Wrocław)
11	FW	POL	Sebastian Strózik
14	DF	POL	Wiktor Łaszyński
15	MF	POL	Wiktor Staszak (on loan from Wisła Kraków)
16	MF	POL	Robert Mandrysz (captain)
17	FW	FIN	Agon Sadiku
18	MF	UKR	Tymofiy Simkov
19	MF	POL	Filip Lachendro (on loan from Ruch Chorzów)

No.	Pos.	Nation	Player
21	DF	POL	Michał Kozajda
22	GK	POL	Krzysztof Bąkowski
24	MF	POL	Kamil Grzelak
28	DF	POL	Jakub Lis
31	MF	POL	Krystian Tworzydło
33	MF	POL	Adrian Bukowski
44	DF	POL	Franciszek Zabrowarny
47	MF	POL	Antoni Klimek
51	MF	POL	Alan Rybak (on loan from Jagiellonia Białystok)
72	FW	POL	Kuba Szabłowski
77	DF	POL	Mateusz Bartolewski
78	GK	POL	Jakub Korolewicz
80	MF	POL	Kacper Tabiś

== Managerial history ==
Caretaker managers listed in italics.

- (Poland) Marian Szymczyk (1979–80)
- (Poland) Antoni Konsewicz (1982–87)
- (Poland) Jan Stępczak (1987–88)
- (Poland) Wojciech Wyganowski (1988–89)
- (Poland) Andrzej Król (1989–90)
- (Poland) Horst Panic (1991–94)
- (Poland) Ryszard Papuszka (1996–97)
- (Poland) Bronisław Przygrodzki (1996–97)
- (Poland) Ireneusz Lorenc (1997)
- (Poland) Wiesław Wojno (1997–2001)
- (Poland) Zbigniew Mandziejewicz (2001–02)
- (Ukraine) Oleksy Tierieszczenko (2002)
- (Poland) Bronisław Przygrodzki (2002–04)
- (Poland) Wiesław Pisarski (2004)
- (Poland) Romuald Kujawa (2004–06)
- (Poland) Wojciech Drożdż (2006–07)
- (Poland) Zbigniew Majdziejewicz (2007)
- (Poland) Andrzej Michalski (2007)
- (Poland) Tomasz Trznadel (2007–09)
- (Poland) Janusz Kubot (2009–10)
- (Poland) Jarosław Wielgus (2010)
- (Poland) Ireneusz Mamrot (2010–17)
- (Poland) Grzegorz Niciński (2017–19)
- (Serbia) Ivan Đurđević (2019–22)
- (Poland) Marek Gołębiewski (2022–23)
- (Poland) Grzegorz Szoka (2023)
- (Poland) Maciej Idzak (2023)
- (Poland) Piotr Plewnia (2023–24)
- (Poland) Łukasz Becella (2024–present)
