= 2019–20 III liga =

III liga
- Season: 2019–20
- Dates: 2 August 2019 – 14 June 2020 (Note: The season was suspended on 12 March 2020 due to the COVID-19 pandemic.)
- Champions: Sokół Ostróda; KKS 1925 Kalisz; Śląsk Wrocław II; Motor Lublin (Note: By regional federation decision.)
- Relegated: None (Note: By regionals federations decision, no team was relegated due to the COVID-19 pandemic.)
- Matches played: 665
- Goals scored: 1,869 (2.81 per match)
- Top goalscorer: Mateusz Żebrowski (20 goals) (Group 2)
- Biggest home win: Motor 7–0 Chełmianka (Group 4)
- Biggest away win: Unia 0–6 Sokół (Group 1); Podlasie 0–6 Wisła (Group 4)
- Highest scoring: Ruch 7–2 Starowice Dolne (Group 3)
- Longest winning run: 8 matches Znicz (Group 1)
- Longest unbeaten run: 18 matches Radunia (Group 2)
- Longest winless run: 18 matches Starowice Dolne (Group 3)
- Longest losing run: 7 matches Polonia (Group 1); Starowice Dolne (Group 3)
- Highest attendance: 6,800; Ruch 3–1 Polonia (Group 3)

The 2019–20 III liga season was the 12th edition of the fourth tier domestic division in the Polish football league system since its establishment in 2008 under its current title (III liga) and the 4th season under its current league division format.

The competition was contested by 72 clubs split geographically across 4 groups of 18 teams each, with the winners of each group gaining promotion to the II liga. The season was played in a round-robin tournament. It began in August 2019 and was supposed to end in June 2020. The teams included amateur clubs (although a few are semi-professional) and the reserve teams of professional clubs.

The season was suspended indefinitely on 12 March 2020 due to the COVID-19 pandemic. On May 14–18, 2020, the regionals federations announced the termination of the competition. The leaders of each group (except Group 4) (Note: In Group 4, promotion was given to the first two teams.) have been promoted to the II liga. No team has been relegated to the IV liga.

== Teams ==
Geographical criteria.

72 teams are divided into four groups according to geographical criteria:

- Group 1 (Łódź – Masovian – Podlaskie – Warmian-Masurian)
- Group 2 (Kuyavian-Pomeranian – Greater Poland – Pomeranian – West Pomeranian)
- Group 3 (Lower Silesian – Lubusz – Opole – Silesian)
- Group 4 (Świętokrzyskie – Lesser Poland – Lublin – Podkarpackie)

Each group of III liga is managed by a different voivodeship football association. In the 2019–20 season these are the following regionals federations:

- Group 1 – Warmian-Masurian Football Association
- Group 2 – Greater Poland Football Association
- Group 3 – Silesian Football Association
- Group 4 – Lublin Football Association

Location of teams and stadiums in 2019–20 III liga. Red: Group I, Green: Group II, Yellow: Group III, Blue: Group IV

== Group 1 ==
III liga Group 1
- Season: 2019–20
- Dates: 3 August 2019 – 13 June 2020
- Champions: Sokół Ostróda
- Relegated: None
- Matches played: 170
- Goals scored: 494 (2.91 per match)
- Top goalscorer: Damian Warchoł (18 goals)
- Biggest home win: Świt 7–1 Wasilków (17 November 2019)
- Biggest away win: Unia 0–6 Sokół (12 October 2019)
- Highest scoring: Świt 5–3 Pogoń (10 August 2019); Lechia 5–3 Unia (22 September 2019); Świt 7–1 Wasilków (17 November 2019)
- Longest winning run: 8 matches Znicz
- Longest unbeaten run: 11 matches Sokół
- Longest winless run: 9 matches Polonia; Wasilków
- Longest losing run: 7 matches Polonia

Pos	Team	Pld	W	D	L	GF	GA	GD	Pts	Promotion or Relegation
1	Sokół Ostróda	18	11	4	3	38	19	+19	37	Promotion to II liga
2	Legia Warsaw II	18	10	6	2	30	17	+13	36 (Note: Head-to-head away goals: Legia Warsaw II 1, Sokół Aleksandrów Łódzki 0.)	
3	Sokół Aleksandrów Łódzki	19	10	6	3	37	22	+15	36	
4	Świt Nowy Dwór Mazowiecki	19	9	6	4	32	20	+12	33	
5	Znicz Biała Piska	19	9	5	5	33	24	+9	32 (Note: Head-to-head points: Znicz Biała Piska 3, Pelikan Łowicz 0.)	
6	Pelikan Łowicz	19	10	2	7	37	26	+11	32	
7	Huragan Morąg	19	8	6	5	26	21	+5	30	
8	Unia Skierniewice	19	9	1	9	33	39	−6	28	
9	Concordia Elbląg	19	7	6	6	23	25	−2	27	
10	Broń Radom	19	7	5	7	26	27	−1	26	
11	RKS Radomsko	19	7	3	9	26	28	−2	24	
12	Olimpia Zambrów	19	6	5	8	31	35	−4	23	
13	Pogoń Grodzisk Mazowiecki	19	6	3	10	31	35	−4	21	
14	Lechia Tomaszów Mazowiecki	19	5	5	9	23	32	−9	20	
15	Ursus Warsaw	19	4	7	8	17	21	−4	19	
16	Ruch Wysokie Mazowieckie	19	3	8	8	23	31	−8	17 (Note: Head-to-head points: Ruch Wysokie Mazowieckie 3, Polonia Warsaw 0.)	
17	Polonia Warsaw	19	4	5	10	16	28	−12	17	
18	KS Wasilków	19	2	3	14	12	44	−32	9	

Source: Soccerway, 90minut
Rules for classification: 1) Points; 2) Head-to-head points; 3) Head-to-head goal difference; 4) Head-to-head goals scored; 5) Head-to-head away goals scored (only if two teams are tied); 6) Goal difference; 7) Goals scored; 8) Fairplay ranking.

== Group 2 ==
III liga Group 2
- Season: 2019–20
- Dates: 2 August 2019 – 14 June 2020
- Champions: KKS 1925 Kalisz
- Relegated: None
- Matches played: 162
- Goals scored: 463 (2.86 per match)
- Top goalscorer: Mateusz Żebrowski (20 goals)
- Biggest home win: Polonia 6–0 Unia (24 August 2019)
- Biggest away win: Gwardia 1–6 Unia (19 October 2019)
- Highest scoring: Radunia 6–2 Kotwica (13 October 2019)
- Longest winning run: 6 matches Kalisz; Mieszko; Kotwica
- Longest unbeaten run: 18 matches Radunia
- Longest winless run: 9 matches Grom
- Longest losing run: 6 matches Jarota

Pos	Team	Pld	W	D	L	GF	GA	GD	Pts	Promotion or Relegation
1	KKS 1925 Kalisz	18	14	3	1	41	12	+29	45	Promotion to II liga
2	Radunia Stężyca	18	11	7	0	37	10	+27	40	
3	Świt Skolwin	18	11	6	1	30	7	+23	39 (Note: Head-to-head points: Świt Skolwin 3, Kotwica Kołobrzeg 0.)	
4	Kotwica Kołobrzeg	18	13	0	5	37	22	+15	39	
5	Mieszko Gniezno	18	11	3	4	33	17	+16	36	
6	Unia Janikowo	18	10	3	5	43	29	+14	33	
7	Sokół Kleczew	18	8	3	7	22	22	0	27	
8	KP Starogard Gdański	18	7	4	7	19	20	−1	25	
9	Polonia Środa Wlkp.	18	6	5	7	28	24	+4	23	
10	Pogoń Szczecin II	18	6	3	9	23	30	−7	21 (Note: Head-to-head points: Pogoń Szczecin II 3, Chemik Police 0.)	
11	Chemik Police	18	6	3	9	21	27	−6	21	
12	Gwardia Koszalin	18	5	3	10	19	37	−18	18	
13	Bałtyk Koszalin	18	4	5	9	17	35	−18	17	
14	Nielba Wągrowiec	18	4	4	10	22	38	−16	16	
15	Jarota Jarocin	18	3	6	9	18	24	−6	15	
16	Górnik Konin	18	4	2	12	22	37	−15	14 (Note: Head-to-head points: Górnik Konin 3, Grom Nowy Staw 0.)	
17	Grom Nowy Staw (Note: Grom Nowy Staw withdrew from the league.)	18	3	5	10	19	35	−16	14	Relegation to IV liga
18	Bałtyk Gdynia	18	3	1	14	12	37	−25	10	

Source: Soccerway, 90minut
Rules for classification: 1) Points; 2) Head-to-head points; 3) Head-to-head goal difference; 4) Head-to-head goals scored; 5) Head-to-head away goals scored (only if two teams are tied); 6) Goal difference; 7) Goals scored; 8) Fairplay ranking.

== Group 3 ==
III liga Group 3
- Season: 2019–20
- Dates: 2 August 2019 – 13 June 2020
- Champions: Śląsk Wrocław II
- Relegated: None
- Matches played: 162
- Goals scored: 474 (2.93 per match)
- Top goalscorer: Mariusz Idzik (14 goals)
- Biggest home win: Piast 5–0 Starowice Dolne (21 September 2019); Ruch 7–2 Starowice Dolne (16 November 2019)
- Biggest away win: Starowice Dolne 1–6 Falubaz (9 November 2019)
- Highest scoring: Ruch 7–2 Starowice Dolne (16 November 2019)
- Longest winning run: 5 matches Pniówek
- Longest unbeaten run: 10 matches Ruch
- Longest winless run: 18 matches Starowice Dolne
- Longest losing run: 7 matches Starowice Dolne
- Highest attendance: 6,800; Ruch 3–1 Polonia (26 October 2019)

Pos	Team	Pld	W	D	L	GF	GA	GD	Pts	Promotion or Relegation
1	Śląsk Wrocław II	18	11	4	3	34	17	+17	37	Promotion to II liga
2	Polonia Bytom	18	10	3	5	31	18	+13	33	
3	Ruch Chorzów	18	8	7	3	34	20	+14	31	
4	MKS Kluczbork	18	9	3	6	30	24	+6	30	
5	Rekord Bielsko-Biała	18	9	2	7	27	29	−2	29 (Note: Head-to-head points: Rekord Bielsko-Biała 3, Ruch Zdzieszowice 0.)	
6	Ruch Zdzieszowice (Note: Ruch Zdzieszowice withdrew from the league.)	18	8	5	5	24	20	+4	29	Relegation to IV liga
7	Gwarek Tarnowskie Góry	18	8	4	6	31	26	+5	28	
8	Pniówek Pawłowice Śląskie	18	7	6	5	24	20	+4	27 (Note: Head-to-head points: Pniówek Pawłowice Śląskie 3, Górnik Zabrze II 0.)	
9	Górnik Zabrze II	18	8	3	7	35	30	+5	27	
10	Falubaz Zielona Góra	18	8	2	8	30	35	−5	26	
11	Ślęza Wrocław	18	6	7	5	22	19	+3	25	
12	Foto-Higiena Gać	18	6	6	6	24	26	−2	24	
13	Miedź Legnica II	18	5	7	6	33	31	+2	22 (Note: Head-to-head points: Miedź Legnica II 3, ROW 1964 Rybnik 0.)	
14	ROW 1964 Rybnik	18	6	4	8	29	32	−3	22	
15	Stal Brzeg	18	4	7	7	22	28	−6	19	
16	Zagłębie Lubin II	18	1	11	6	17	23	−6	14 (Note: Head-to-head away goals: Zagłębie Lubin II 2, Piast Żmigród 0.)	
17	Piast Żmigród	18	3	5	10	20	31	−11	14	
18	LZS Starowice Dolne (Note: LZS Starowice Dolne withdrew from the league.)	18	0	4	14	7	45	−38	4	Relegation to IV liga

Source: Soccerway, 90minut
Rules for classification: 1) Points; 2) Head-to-head points; 3) Head-to-head goal difference; 4) Head-to-head goals scored; 5) Head-to-head away goals scored (only if two teams are tied); 6) Goal difference; 7) Goals scored; 8) Fairplay ranking.

== Group 4 ==
III liga Group 4
- Season: 2019–20
- Dates: 10 August 2019 – 14 June 2020
- Champions: Motor Lublin
- Relegated: None
- Matches played: 171
- Goals scored: 438 (2.56 per match)
- Top goalscorer: Rafał Król; Krzysztof Ropski (16 goals each)
- Biggest home win: Motor 7–0 Chełmianka (7 March 2020)
- Biggest away win: Podlasie 0–6 Wisła (19 October 2019)
- Highest scoring: Korona II 6–2 Podlasie (21 September 2019); Motor 4–4 Korona II (19 October 2019)
- Longest winning run: 5 matches Motor
- Longest unbeaten run: 11 matches Hutnik; Wólczanka
- Longest winless run: 15 matches Chełmianka; Podlasie
- Longest losing run: 4 matches Jutrzenka; Hetman; Orlęta; Podlasie

Pos	Team	Pld	W	D	L	GF	GA	GD	Pts	Promotion or Relegation
1	Motor Lublin	19	10	6	3	36	16	+20	36 (Note: Head-to-head points: Hutnik Kraków 3, Motor Lublin 0. (Note: During the season, the position in the table was determined by the goal difference.))	Promotion to II liga (Note: Due to the fact that the competition was not completed, promotion to the II league was granted to Motor Lublin, who, with an equal number of points with Hutnik Kraków, obtained a more favorable goal difference. Then, by the decision of the PZPN Emergency Committee, the number of promotion teams from this group was increased to two.)
2	Hutnik Kraków	19	10	6	3	34	27	+7	36	Promotion to II liga
3	Wólczanka Wólka Pełkińska	19	9	8	2	27	16	+11	35	
4	Korona Kielce II	19	10	4	5	38	26	+12	34	
5	Siarka Tarnobrzeg	19	8	6	5	30	23	+7	30	
6	Wisła Puławy	19	8	5	6	21	19	+2	29	
7	Stal Kraśnik	19	7	7	5	29	20	+9	28 (Note: Head-to-head points: Stal Kraśnik 6, Avia Świdnik 3, Podhale Nowy Targ 0.)	
8	Avia Świdnik	19	7	7	5	26	27	−1	28	
9	Podhale Nowy Targ	19	8	4	7	30	24	+6	28	
10	Wisłoka Dębica	19	7	6	6	22	14	+8	27	
11	Wisła Sandomierz	19	6	7	6	24	19	+5	25	
12	Sokół Sieniawa	19	6	7	6	17	18	−1	25	
13	KSZO Ostrowiec Świętokrzyski	19	6	6	7	21	21	0	24	
14	Hetman Zamość	19	5	7	7	22	25	−3	22	
15	Orlęta Radzyń Podlaski	19	3	7	9	15	25	−10	16 (Note: Head-to-head away goals: Orlęta Radzyń Podlaski 1, Jutrzenka Giebułtów 0.)	
16	Jutrzenka Giebułtów	19	4	4	11	14	30	−16	16	
17	Chełmianka Chełm	19	1	8	10	12	35	−23	11	
18	Podlasie Biała Podlaska	19	1	5	13	20	53	−33	8	

Source: Soccerway, 90minut
Rules for classification: 1) Points; 2) Head-to-head points; 3) Head-to-head goal difference; 4) Head-to-head goals scored; 5) Head-to-head away goals scored (only if two teams are tied); 6) Goal difference; 7) Goals scored; 8) Fairplay ranking.

== See also ==
- 2019–20 Ekstraklasa
- 2019–20 I liga
- 2019–20 II liga
- 2019–20 Polish Cup
