= 2019–20 in Polish football =

Season of Polish football

Football in Poland
- Season: 2019–20

Men's football
- Ekstraklasa: Legia Warsaw
- I liga: Stal Mielec
- II liga: Górnik Łęczna
- Polish Cup: Cracovia
- Polish Super Cup: Lechia Gdańsk

2019–20 in Polish football
- Teams in Europe
- Piast Gliwice; Lechia Gdańsk; Legia Warsaw; Cracovia
- Poland national team
- UEFA Euro 2020 qualifying

The 2019–20 season was the 95th season of competitive football in Poland.

== League competitions ==
=== Ekstraklasa ===
==== Regular season ====
Pos	Team	Pld	W	D	L	GF	GA	GD	Pts	Qualification
1	Legia Warsaw	30	19	3	8	63	30	+33	60	Qualification for the Championship round
2	Piast Gliwice	30	16	5	9	36	26	+10	53	Qualification for the Championship round
3	Śląsk Wrocław	30	13	10	7	42	33	+9	49 (Note: Head-to-head points: Śląsk Wrocław 4, Lech Poznań 1.)	Qualification for the Championship round
4	Lech Poznań	30	13	10	7	55	29	+26	49	Qualification for the Championship round
5	Cracovia	30	14	4	12	39	29	+10	46	Qualification for the Championship round
6	Pogoń Szczecin	30	12	9	9	29	31	−2	45	Qualification for the Championship round
7	Jagiellonia Białystok	30	12	8	10	41	39	+2	44	Qualification for the Championship round
8	Lechia Gdańsk	30	11	10	9	40	42	−2	43	Qualification for the Championship round
9	Górnik Zabrze	30	10	11	9	39	38	+1	41 (Note: Head-to-head away goals: Górnik Zabrze 1, Raków Częstochowa 0.)	Qualification for the Relegation round
10	Raków Częstochowa	30	12	5	13	38	43	−5	41	Qualification for the Relegation round
11	Zagłębie Lubin	30	10	8	12	49	46	+3	38 (Note: Head-to-head points: Zagłębie Lubin 4, Wisła Płock 1.)	Qualification for the Relegation round
12	Wisła Płock	30	10	8	12	37	50	−13	38	Qualification for the Relegation round
13	Wisła Kraków	30	10	5	15	37	47	−10	35	Qualification for the Relegation round
14	Korona Kielce	30	8	6	16	21	37	−16	30	Qualification for the Relegation round
15	Arka Gdynia	30	7	8	15	28	47	−19	29	Qualification for the Relegation round
16	ŁKS Łódź	30	5	6	19	26	53	−27	21	Qualification for the Relegation round

Source: Ekstraklasa, 90minut
Rules for classification: 1) Points; 2) Head-to-head points; 3) Head-to-head goal difference; 4) Head-to-head goals scored; 5) Head-to-head away goals scored (only if two teams); 6) Goal difference; 7) Goals scored; 8) Fairplay ranking; 9) Draw. (Note: Head-to-head record is used only after all the matches between the teams in question have been played.)

==== Championship round ====
Pos	Team	Pld	W	D	L	GF	GA	GD	Pts	Qualification
1	Legia Warsaw (C)	37	21	6	10	70	35	+35	69	Qualification for the Champions League first qualifying round
2	Lech Poznań	37	18	12	7	70	35	+35	66	Qualification for the Europa League first qualifying round
3	Piast Gliwice	37	18	7	12	41	32	+9	61	Qualification for the Europa League first qualifying round
4	Lechia Gdańsk	37	15	11	11	48	50	−2	56	
5	Śląsk Wrocław	37	14	12	11	51	46	+5	54 (Note: Points in regular season: Śląsk Wrocław - 49 pts, Pogoń Szczecin - 45 pts.)	
6	Pogoń Szczecin	37	14	12	11	37	39	−2	54	
7	Cracovia	37	16	5	16	49	40	+9	53	Qualification for the Europa League first qualifying round (Note: Cracovia qualified for the Europa League first qualifying round by winning the 2019–20 Polish Cup.)
8	Jagiellonia Białystok	37	14	10	13	48	51	−3	52	

Source: Ekstraklasa, 90minut
Rules for classification: 1) Points; 2) Points in regular season; 3) Head-to-head points in regular season; 4) Head-to-head goal difference in regular season; 5) Head-to-head goals scored in regular season; 5) Head-to-head away goals scored in regular season (if only two teams); 7) Goal difference; 8) Goals scored; 9) Fairplay ranking; 10) Play-off (only if needed to decide champion, teams for relegation or teams for UEFA competitions).
(C) Champions

==== Relegation round ====
Pos	Team	Pld	W	D	L	GF	GA	GD	Pts	Qualification
9	Górnik Zabrze	37	14	11	12	51	47	+4	53 (Note: Points in regular season: Górnik Zabrze - 41 pts, Raków Częstochowa - 41 pts, Zagłębie Lubin - 38 pts. Head-to-head away goals in regular season: Górnik Zabrze 1, Raków Częstochowa 0.)	
10	Raków Częstochowa	37	16	5	16	51	56	−5	53	
11	Zagłębie Lubin	37	15	8	14	61	53	+8	53	
12	Wisła Płock	37	14	9	14	45	54	−9	51	
13	Wisła Kraków	37	13	6	18	44	56	−12	45	
14	Arka Gdynia (R)	37	10	10	17	39	57	−18	40	Relegation to I liga
15	Korona Kielce (R)	37	9	8	20	29	48	−19	35	Relegation to I liga
16	ŁKS Łódź (R)	37	6	6	25	33	68	−35	24	Relegation to I liga

Source: Ekstraklasa, 90minut
Rules for classification: 1) Points; 2) Points in regular season; 3) Head-to-head points in regular season; 4) Head-to-head goal difference in regular season; 5) Head-to-head goals scored in regular season; 5) Head-to-head away goals scored in regular season (if only two teams); 7) Goal difference; 8) Goals scored; 9) Fairplay ranking; 10) Play-off (only if needed to decide champion, teams for relegation or teams for UEFA competitions).
(R) Relegated

=== I liga ===
Pos	Team	Pld	W	D	L	GF	GA	GD	Pts	Promotion or Relegation
1	Stal Mielec (C, P)	34	21	4	9	57	31	+26	67	Promotion to Ekstraklasa
2	Podbeskidzie Bielsko-Biała (P)	34	19	8	7	64	35	+29	65	Promotion to Ekstraklasa
3	Warta Poznań (P)	34	18	6	10	52	35	+17	60	Qualification for Promotion play-offs
4	Radomiak Radom	34	16	9	9	52	45	+7	57	Qualification for Promotion play-offs
5	Miedź Legnica	34	14	9	11	49	44	+5	51	Qualification for Promotion play-offs
6	Nieciecza	34	14	8	12	47	34	+13	50	Qualification for Promotion play-offs
7	Chrobry Głogów	34	14	7	13	41	44	−3	49	
8	Puszcza Niepołomice	34	13	9	12	36	37	−1	48	
9	GKS Tychy	34	12	11	11	60	53	+7	47	
10	Stomil Olsztyn	34	13	7	14	30	38	−8	46	
11	Zagłębie Sosnowiec	34	12	8	14	49	55	−6	44 (Note: Head-to-head record: Zagłębie 3-1 Sandecja, Sandecja 1-1 Zagłębie)	
12	Sandecja Nowy Sącz	34	12	8	14	45	49	−4	44	
13	Odra Opole	34	11	9	14	33	39	−6	42	
14	Jastrzębie	34	9	14	11	41	46	−5	41	
15	Bełchatów	34	11	7	16	36	45	−9	40 (Note: Head-to-head record: Bełchatów 1-0 Olimpia, Olimpia 1-2 Bełchatów)	
16	Olimpia Grudziądz (R)	34	11	7	16	45	56	−11	40	Relegation to II liga
17	Chojniczanka Chojnice (R)	34	8	6	20	46	67	−21	30	Relegation to II liga
18	Wigry Suwałki (R)	34	7	5	22	27	57	−30	26	Relegation to II liga

Source: 1 liga, 90minut
Rules for classification: 1) Points; 2) Head-to-head points; 3) Head-to-head goal difference; 4) Head-to-head away goals scored (only if two teams); 5) Goal difference; 6) Goals scored; 7) Games won; 8) Away games won; 9) PZPN draw.
(C) Champions; (P) Promoted; (R) Relegated

=== II liga ===
Pos	Team	Pld	W	D	L	GF	GA	GD	Pts	Promotion or Relegation
1	Górnik Łęczna (C, P)	34	18	9	7	47	37	+10	63	Promotion to I liga
2	Widzew Łódź (P)	34	17	8	9	65	37	+28	59	Promotion to I liga
3	GKS Katowice	34	17	8	9	57	40	+17	59	Qualification for Promotion play-offs
4	Bytovia Bytów	34	14	10	10	50	48	+2	52 (Note: Head-to-head points: Bytovia Bytów 4, Resovia Rzeszów 1)	Qualification for Promotion play-offs
5	Resovia Rzeszów (P)	34	13	13	8	50	32	+18	52	Qualification for Promotion play-offs
6	Stal Rzeszów	34	15	6	13	55	44	+11	51	Qualification for Promotion play-offs
7	Garbarnia Kraków	34	14	8	12	46	40	+6	50 (Note: Head-to-head points: Garbarnia Kraków 4, Olimpia Elbląg 1)	
8	Olimpia Elbląg	34	13	11	10	46	38	+8	50	
9	Znicz Pruszków	34	15	4	15	49	52	−3	49 (Note: Head-to-head points: Znicz Pruszków 6, Pogoń Siedlce 0)	
10	Pogoń Siedlce	34	15	4	15	54	53	+1	49	
11	Górnik Polkowice	34	13	9	12	60	47	+13	48	
12	Błękitni Stargard	34	14	5	15	54	53	+1	47 (Note: Head-to-head points (goal difference): Błękitni Stargard 7 (+4), Lech Poznań II 5 (-1), Skra Częstochowa 4 (-4))	
13	Lech Poznań II	34	12	11	11	49	47	+2	47	
14	Skra Częstochowa	34	13	8	13	37	44	−7	47	
15	Stal Stalowa Wola (R)	34	13	7	14	45	49	−4	46	Relegation to III liga
16	Elana Toruń (R)	34	11	8	15	50	54	−4	41	Relegation to III liga
17	Legionovia Legionowo (R)	34	6	6	22	33	64	−31	24	Relegation to III liga
18	Gryf Wejherowo (R)	34	3	5	26	23	91	−68	14	Relegation to III liga

Source: Soccerway, 90minut.pl
Rules for classification: 1) Points; 2) Head-to-head points; 3) Head-to-head goal difference; 4) Head-to-head away goals scored (only if two teams); 5) Goal difference; 6) Goals scored; 7) fairplay ranking.
(C) Champions; (P) Promoted; (R) Relegated

=== III liga ===
==== Group 1 ====
Pos	Team	Pld	W	D	L	GF	GA	GD	Pts	Promotion or Relegation
1	Sokół Ostróda	18	11	4	3	38	19	+19	37	Promotion to II liga
2	Legia Warsaw II	18	10	6	2	30	17	+13	36 (Note: Head-to-head away goals: Legia Warsaw II 1, Sokół Aleksandrów Łódzki 0.)	
3	Sokół Aleksandrów Łódzki	19	10	6	3	37	22	+15	36	
4	Świt Nowy Dwór Mazowiecki	19	9	6	4	32	20	+12	33	
5	Znicz Biała Piska	19	9	5	5	33	24	+9	32 (Note: Head-to-head points: Znicz Biała Piska 3, Pelikan Łowicz 0.)	
6	Pelikan Łowicz	19	10	2	7	37	26	+11	32	
7	Huragan Morąg	19	8	6	5	26	21	+5	30	
8	Unia Skierniewice	19	9	1	9	33	39	−6	28	
9	Concordia Elbląg	19	7	6	6	23	25	−2	27	
10	Broń Radom	19	7	5	7	26	27	−1	26	
11	RKS Radomsko	19	7	3	9	26	28	−2	24	
12	Olimpia Zambrów	19	6	5	8	31	35	−4	23	
13	Pogoń Grodzisk Mazowiecki	19	6	3	10	31	35	−4	21	
14	Lechia Tomaszów Mazowiecki	19	5	5	9	23	32	−9	20	
15	Ursus Warsaw	19	4	7	8	17	21	−4	19	
16	Ruch Wysokie Mazowieckie	19	3	8	8	23	31	−8	17 (Note: Head-to-head points: Ruch Wysokie Mazowieckie 3, Polonia Warsaw 0.)	
17	Polonia Warsaw	19	4	5	10	16	28	−12	17	
18	KS Wasilków	19	2	3	14	12	44	−32	9	

Source: Soccerway, 90minut
Rules for classification: 1) Points; 2) Head-to-head points; 3) Head-to-head goal difference; 4) Head-to-head goals scored; 5) Head-to-head away goals scored (only if two teams are tied); 6) Goal difference; 7) Goals scored; 8) Fairplay ranking.

==== Group 2 ====
Pos	Team	Pld	W	D	L	GF	GA	GD	Pts	Promotion or Relegation
1	KKS 1925 Kalisz	18	14	3	1	41	12	+29	45	Promotion to II liga
2	Radunia Stężyca	18	11	7	0	37	10	+27	40	
3	Świt Skolwin	18	11	6	1	30	7	+23	39 (Note: Head-to-head points: Świt Skolwin 3, Kotwica Kołobrzeg 0.)	
4	Kotwica Kołobrzeg	18	13	0	5	37	22	+15	39	
5	Mieszko Gniezno	18	11	3	4	33	17	+16	36	
6	Unia Janikowo	18	10	3	5	43	29	+14	33	
7	Sokół Kleczew	18	8	3	7	22	22	0	27	
8	KP Starogard Gdański	18	7	4	7	19	20	−1	25	
9	Polonia Środa Wlkp.	18	6	5	7	28	24	+4	23	
10	Pogoń Szczecin II	18	6	3	9	23	30	−7	21 (Note: Head-to-head points: Pogoń Szczecin II 3, Chemik Police 0.)	
11	Chemik Police	18	6	3	9	21	27	−6	21	
12	Gwardia Koszalin	18	5	3	10	19	37	−18	18	
13	Bałtyk Koszalin	18	4	5	9	17	35	−18	17	
14	Nielba Wągrowiec	18	4	4	10	22	38	−16	16	
15	Jarota Jarocin	18	3	6	9	18	24	−6	15	
16	Górnik Konin	18	4	2	12	22	37	−15	14 (Note: Head-to-head points: Górnik Konin 3, Grom Nowy Staw 0.)	
17	Grom Nowy Staw (Note: Grom Nowy Staw withdrew from the league.)	18	3	5	10	19	35	−16	14	Relegation to IV liga
18	Bałtyk Gdynia	18	3	1	14	12	37	−25	10	

Source: Soccerway, 90minut
Rules for classification: 1) Points; 2) Head-to-head points; 3) Head-to-head goal difference; 4) Head-to-head goals scored; 5) Head-to-head away goals scored (only if two teams are tied); 6) Goal difference; 7) Goals scored; 8) Fairplay ranking.

==== Group 3 ====
Pos	Team	Pld	W	D	L	GF	GA	GD	Pts	Promotion or Relegation
1	Śląsk Wrocław II	18	11	4	3	34	17	+17	37	Promotion to II liga
2	Polonia Bytom	18	10	3	5	31	18	+13	33	
3	Ruch Chorzów	18	8	7	3	34	20	+14	31	
4	MKS Kluczbork	18	9	3	6	30	24	+6	30	
5	Rekord Bielsko-Biała	18	9	2	7	27	29	−2	29 (Note: Head-to-head points: Rekord Bielsko-Biała 3, Ruch Zdzieszowice 0.)	
6	Ruch Zdzieszowice (Note: Ruch Zdzieszowice withdrew from the league.)	18	8	5	5	24	20	+4	29	Relegation to IV liga
7	Gwarek Tarnowskie Góry	18	8	4	6	31	26	+5	28	
8	Pniówek Pawłowice Śląskie	18	7	6	5	24	20	+4	27 (Note: Head-to-head points: Pniówek Pawłowice Śląskie 3, Górnik Zabrze II 0.)	
9	Górnik Zabrze II	18	8	3	7	35	30	+5	27	
10	Falubaz Zielona Góra	18	8	2	8	30	35	−5	26	
11	Ślęza Wrocław	18	6	7	5	22	19	+3	25	
12	Foto-Higiena Gać	18	6	6	6	24	26	−2	24	
13	Miedź Legnica II	18	5	7	6	33	31	+2	22 (Note: Head-to-head points: Miedź Legnica II 3, ROW 1964 Rybnik 0.)	
14	ROW 1964 Rybnik	18	6	4	8	29	32	−3	22	
15	Stal Brzeg	18	4	7	7	22	28	−6	19	
16	Zagłębie Lubin II	18	1	11	6	17	23	−6	14 (Note: Head-to-head away goals: Zagłębie Lubin II 2, Piast Żmigród 0.)	
17	Piast Żmigród	18	3	5	10	20	31	−11	14	
18	LZS Starowice Dolne (Note: LZS Starowice Dolne withdrew from the league.)	18	0	4	14	7	45	−38	4	Relegation to IV liga

Source: Soccerway, 90minut
Rules for classification: 1) Points; 2) Head-to-head points; 3) Head-to-head goal difference; 4) Head-to-head goals scored; 5) Head-to-head away goals scored (only if two teams are tied); 6) Goal difference; 7) Goals scored; 8) Fairplay ranking.

==== Group 4 ====
Pos	Team	Pld	W	D	L	GF	GA	GD	Pts	Promotion or Relegation
1	Motor Lublin	19	10	6	3	36	16	+20	36 (Note: Head-to-head points: Hutnik Kraków 3, Motor Lublin 0. (Note: During the season, the position in the table was determined by the goal difference.))	Promotion to II liga (Note: Due to the fact that the competition was not completed, promotion to the II league was granted to Motor Lublin, who, with an equal number of points with Hutnik Kraków, obtained a more favorable goal difference. Then, by the decision of the PZPN Emergency Committee, the number of promotion teams from this group was increased to two.)
2	Hutnik Kraków	19	10	6	3	34	27	+7	36	Promotion to II liga
3	Wólczanka Wólka Pełkińska	19	9	8	2	27	16	+11	35	
4	Korona Kielce II	19	10	4	5	38	26	+12	34	
5	Siarka Tarnobrzeg	19	8	6	5	30	23	+7	30	
6	Wisła Puławy	19	8	5	6	21	19	+2	29	
7	Stal Kraśnik	19	7	7	5	29	20	+9	28 (Note: Head-to-head points: Stal Kraśnik 6, Avia Świdnik 3, Podhale Nowy Targ 0.)	
8	Avia Świdnik	19	7	7	5	26	27	−1	28	
9	Podhale Nowy Targ	19	8	4	7	30	24	+6	28	
10	Wisłoka Dębica	19	7	6	6	22	14	+8	27	
11	Wisła Sandomierz	19	6	7	6	24	19	+5	25	
12	Sokół Sieniawa	19	6	7	6	17	18	−1	25	
13	KSZO Ostrowiec Świętokrzyski	19	6	6	7	21	21	0	24	
14	Hetman Zamość	19	5	7	7	22	25	−3	22	
15	Orlęta Radzyń Podlaski	19	3	7	9	15	25	−10	16 (Note: Head-to-head away goals: Orlęta Radzyń Podlaski 1, Jutrzenka Giebułtów 0.)	
16	Jutrzenka Giebułtów	19	4	4	11	14	30	−16	16	
17	Chełmianka Chełm	19	1	8	10	12	35	−23	11	
18	Podlasie Biała Podlaska	19	1	5	13	20	53	−33	8	

Source: Soccerway, 90minut
Rules for classification: 1) Points; 2) Head-to-head points; 3) Head-to-head goal difference; 4) Head-to-head goals scored; 5) Head-to-head away goals scored (only if two teams are tied); 6) Goal difference; 7) Goals scored; 8) Fairplay ranking.

== Polish Cup ==
24 July 2020 (Note: The match on 2 May 2020 16:00 CEST at the National Stadium in Warsaw was postponed due to the COVID-19 pandemic.)
20:00 CEST (UTC+02:00)

Cracovia	3–2 (a.e.t.)	Lechia Gdańsk
Van Amersfoort 65'; Jablonský 88'; Wdowiak 117'	Report; Report	Haydary 21'; Lipski 85'

Arena Lublin, Lublin
Attendance: 3,478 (Note: Match have been played with "no more than 25 percent of the number of seats allocated to the public" due to the COVID-19 pandemic.)
Referee: Paweł Raczkowski (Warsaw)

== Polish Super Cup ==
13 July 2019
20:30 CEST (UTC+02:00)

Piast Gliwice	1–3	Lechia Gdańsk
Sokołowski 68'	Report; Report	Haraslín 2', 47'; Kubicki 21'

Stadion Miejski, Gliwice
Attendance: 6,791
Referee: Paweł Raczkowski (Warsaw)

== Polish clubs in Europe ==
=== Piast Gliwice ===
2019–20 UEFA Champions League

==== Qualifying phase ====
10 July 2019 1st QR	BATE Borisov (Belarus)	1–1	(Poland) Piast Gliwice	Borisov Arena, Barysaw
20:00 CEST (UTC+2)	Drahun 64'	Report	Parzyszek 36'	Attendance: 11,529; Referee: Mete Kalkavan (Turkey)

17 July 2019 1st QR	Piast Gliwice (Poland)	1–2	(Belarus) BATE Borisov	Stadion Piast, Gliwice
20:00 CEST (UTC+2)	Czerwiński 21'	Report	Moukam 82'; Volkov 87'	Attendance: 9,312; Referee: Antti Munukka (Finland)

BATE Borisov won 3–2 on aggregate.

2019–20 UEFA Europa League

==== Qualifying phase ====
25 July 2019 2nd QR	Piast Gliwice (Poland)	3–2	(Latvia) Riga FC	Stadion Piast, Gliwice
20:00 CEST (UTC+2)	Czerwiński 66'; Félix 82', 85'	Report	Debelko 22'; Korun 86' (o.g.)	Attendance: 5,100; Referee: Manuel Schüttengruber (Austria)

1 August 2019 2nd QR	Riga (Latvia)	2–1	(Poland) Piast Gliwice	Skonto Stadium, Riga
18:30 CEST (UTC+2)	Pētersons 26'; Biliński 83'	Report	Félix 20'	Attendance: 3,541; Referee: Eitan Shemeulevitch (Israel)

4–4 on aggregate. Riga won on away goals.

=== Lechia Gdańsk ===
2019–20 UEFA Europa League

==== Qualifying phase ====
25 July 2019 2nd QR	Lechia Gdańsk (Poland)	2–1	(Denmark) Brøndby	Stadion Energa Gdańsk, Gdańsk
19:00 CEST (UTC+2)	Paixão 26' (pen.); Lipski 63'	Report	Hedlund 59'	Attendance: 25,875; Referee: John Beaton (Scotland)

1 August 2019 2nd QR	Brøndby (Denmark)	4–1 (a.e.t.)	(Poland) Lechia Gdańsk	Brøndby Stadium, Brøndbyvester
19:30 CEST (UTC+2)	Arajuuri 15'; Wilczek 53'; Lindstrøm 94', 119'	Report	Paixão 67'	Attendance: 16,426; Referee: Miroslav Zelinka (Czech Republic)

Brøndby won 5–3 on aggregate.

=== Legia Warsaw ===
2019–20 UEFA Europa League

==== Qualifying phase ====
11 July 2019 1st QR	Europa (Gibraltar)	0–0	(Poland) Legia Warsaw	Victoria Stadium, Gibraltar
20:30 CEST (UTC+2)	Salazar (yellow card) 62'; Yahaya (yellow card) 82'	Report		Attendance: 787; Referee: Alex Troleis (Faroe Islands)

18 July 2019 1st QR	Legia Warsaw (Poland)	3–0	(Gibraltar) Europa	Polish Army Stadium, Warsaw
21:00 CEST (UTC+2)	Carlitos 7', 60'; Kulenović 13'	Report		Attendance: 14,839; Referee: Robert Jenkins (Wales)

Legia Warsaw won 4–0 on aggregate.

25 July 2019 2nd QR	Legia Warsaw (Poland)	1–0	(Finland) KuPS	Polish Army Stadium, Warsaw
21:00 CEST (UTC+2)	Wieteska 9'	Report		Attendance: 11,678; Referee: Ivan Bebek (Croatia)

1 August 2019 2nd QR	KuPS (Finland)	0–0	(Poland) Legia Warsaw	Kuopio Football Stadium, Kuopio
19:00 CEST (UTC+2)		Report		Attendance: 3,200; Referee: Lawrence Visser (Belgium)

Legia Warsaw won 1–0 on aggregate.

8 August 2019 3rd QR	Legia Warsaw (Poland)	0–0	(Greece) Atromitos	Polish Army Stadium, Warsaw
21:00 CEST (UTC+2)		Report		Attendance: 15,093; Referee: Manuel Schüttengruber (Austria)

14 August 2019 3rd QR	Atromitos (Greece)	0–2	(Poland) Legia Warsaw	Peristeri Stadium, Athens
18:00 CEST (UTC+2)		Report	Stolarski 29'; Gvilia 51'	Attendance: 2,500; Referee: Bas Nijhuis (Netherlands)

Legia Warsaw won 2–0 on aggregate.

22 August 2019 Play-off	Legia Warsaw (Poland)	0–0	(Scotland) Rangers	Polish Army Stadium, Warsaw
20:00 CEST (UTC+2)		Report		Attendance: 26,665; Referee: Benoît Bastien (France)

29 August 2019 Play-off	Rangers (Scotland)	1–0	(Poland) Legia Warsaw	Ibrox Stadium, Glasgow
20:45 CEST (UTC+2)	Morelos 90+1'	Report		Attendance: 45,463; Referee: Slavko Vinčić (Slovenia)

Rangers won 1–0 on aggregate.

=== Cracovia ===
2019–20 UEFA Europa League

==== Qualifying phase ====
11 July 2019 1st QR	DAC Dunajská Streda (Slovakia)	1–1	(Poland) Cracovia	MOL Aréna, Dunajská Streda
20:30 CEST (UTC+2)	Divković 44'	Report	Kružliak 40' (o.g.)	Attendance: 9,860; Referee: Rade Obrenovič (Slovenia)

18 July 2019 1st QR	Cracovia (Poland)	2–2 (a.e.t.)	(Slovakia) DAC Dunajská Streda	Marshal Józef Piłsudski Stadium, Kraków
19:00 CEST (UTC+2)	Lopes 2'; Piszczek 120+2'	Report	Ronan 47'; Ramirez 94'	Attendance: 13,255; Referee: Athanasios Tzilos (Greece)

3–3 on aggregate. DAC Dunajská Streda won on away goals.

== National teams ==
=== Poland national team ===
==== UEFA Euro 2020 qualifying ====
Pos	Team	Pld	W	D	L	GF	GA	GD	Pts	Qualification	(Poland)	(Austria)	(North Macedonia)	(Slovenia)	(Israel)	(Latvia)
1	Poland	10	8	1	1	18	5	+13	25	Qualify for final tournament	—	0–0	2–0	3–2	4–0	2–0
2	Austria	10	6	1	3	19	9	+10	19	Qualify for final tournament	0–1	—	2–1	1–0	3–1	6–0
3	North Macedonia	10	4	2	4	12	13	−1	14 (Note: Head-to-head points: North Macedonia 4, Slovenia 1.)	Advance to play-offs via Nations League	0–1	1–4	—	2–1	1–0	3–1
4	Slovenia	10	4	2	4	16	11	+5	14		2–0	0–1	1–1	—	3–2	1–0
5	Israel	10	3	2	5	16	18	−2	11	Advance to play-offs via Nations League	1–2	4–2	1–1	1–1	—	3–1
6	Latvia	10	1	0	9	3	28	−25	3		0–3	1–0	0–2	0–5	0–3	—

Source: UEFA
Rules for classification: Qualification tiebreakers
Notes:

6 September 2019 UEFA Euro 2020 qualifying	Slovenia	2–0	Poland	Stožice Stadium, Ljubljana
20:45 (UTC+2)	Struna 35'; Šporar 65'	Report		Attendance: 15,231; Referee: Sergei Karasev (Russia)

9 September 2019 UEFA Euro 2020 qualifying	Poland	0–0	Austria	National Stadium, Warsaw
20:45 (UTC+2)		Report		Attendance: 56,788; Referee: Viktor Kassai (Hungary)

10 October 2019 UEFA Euro 2020 qualifying	Latvia	0–3	Poland	Riga, Latvia
21:45 (UTC+3)		Report	Lewandowski 9', 13', 76'	Stadium: Daugava Stadium; Attendance: 7,107; Referee: Halis Özkahya (Turkey)

13 October 2019 UEFA Euro 2020 qualifying	Poland	2–0	North Macedonia	National Stadium, Warsaw
20:45 (UTC+2)	Frankowski 74'; Milik 80'	Report		Attendance: 52,894; Referee: Antonio Mateu Lahoz (Spain)

16 November 2019 UEFA Euro 2020 qualifying	Israel	1–2	Poland	Jerusalem, Israel
21:45 (UTC+2)	Dabour 88'	Report	Krychowiak 4'; Piątek 54'	Stadium: Teddy Stadium; Attendance: 16,700; Referee: Mattias Gestranius (Finland)

19 November 2019 UEFA Euro 2020 qualifying	Poland	3–2	Slovenia	Warsaw, Poland
20:45 (UTC+1)	Szymański 3'; Lewandowski 54'; Góralski 81'	Report	Matavž 14'; Iličić 61'	Stadium: National Stadium; Attendance: 53,946; Referee: Daniel Siebert (Germany)

=== Poland national under-21 team ===
==== 2021 UEFA European Under-21 Championship qualification ====
Pos	Team	Pld	W	D	L	GF	GA	GD	Pts	Qualification	Russia	Poland	Bulgaria	Serbia	Estonia	Latvia
1	Russia	10	7	2	1	22	4	+18	23	Final tournament	—	2–2	2–0	1–0	4–0	2−0
2	Poland	10	6	2	2	19	8	+11	20		1–0	—	1–1	1–0	4–0	3–1
3	Bulgaria	10	5	3	2	14	5	+9	18		0–0	3−0	—	0–1	3–0	1–0
4	Serbia	10	3	3	4	12	9	+3	12		0–2	1–0	1–2	—	6−0	1–1
5	Estonia	10	1	2	7	3	34	−31	5		0–5	0–6	0–4	0–0	—	2–1
6	Latvia	10	0	4	6	7	17	−10	4		1–4	0–1	0–0	2–2	1–1	—

Source: UEFA

6 September 2019 UEFA EURO U-21 qualification	Latvia	0–1	Poland	Zemgale Olympic Center, Jelgava
16:00 CEST (UTC+02:00)		UEFA; 90minut	Klimala 27'	Attendance: 350; Referee: Admir Šehović (Bosnia and Herzegovina)

10 September 2019 UEFA EURO U-21 qualification	Poland	4–0	Estonia	Białystok City Stadium, Białystok
18:00 CEST (UTC+02:00)	Płacheta 6'; Fila 65'; Jóźwiak 80'; Dziczek 90+4' (pen.)	UEFA; 90minut		Attendance: 6,358; Referee: Rohit Saggi (Norway)

11 October 2019 UEFA EURO U-21 qualification	Russia	2–2	Poland	Central Stadium, Yekaterinburg
16:00 CEST (UTC+02:00)	Utkin 25'; Suleymanov 90+1'	UEFA; 90minut	Diveyev 10' (o.g.); Klimala 45+1'	Attendance: 16,028; Referee: Pavel Orel (Czech Republic)

15 October 2019 UEFA EURO U-21 qualification	Poland	1–0	Serbia	Stadion Widzewa, Łódź
18:00 CEST (UTC+02:00)	Bogusz 79'	UEFA; 90minut		Attendance: 3,628; Referee: João Pinheiro (Portugal)

15 November 2019 UEFA EURO U-21 qualification	Bulgaria	3–0	Poland	Slavia Stadium, Sofia
17:00 CET (UTC+01:00)	Yordanov 43'; Ivanov 51', 61'	UEFA; 90minut		Attendance: 453; Referee: Yaroslav Kozyk (Ukraine)

27 March 2020 UEFA EURO U-21 qualification	Poland	v	Latvia
		UEFA
Note: Match originally scheduled on 27 March 2020 was postponed due to the COVID-19 pandemic in Europe.

==== Friendlies ====
18 November 2019 Friendly	Montenegro	1–0	Poland	DG Arena, Podgorica
15:00 CET (UTC+01:00)	Sekulić 2'	90minut		Referee: Milovan Milačić (Montenegro)
