= Kamil Król =

Polish footballer

Personal information
- Date of birth: 20 June 1987 (age 39)
- Place of birth: Janów Lubelski, Poland
- Height: 1.93 m (6 ft 4 in)
- Position: Striker

Team information
- Current team: GLKS Polichna

Youth career
- MUKS Kraśnik
- Stal Kraśnik

Senior career*
Years	Team	Apps	(Gls)
2005–2006	Górnik Zabrze	29	(4)
2006–2007	Brescia	3	(0)
2007–2009	Motor Lublin	27	(2)
2009	Kluczbork	6	(0)
2010	Górnik Polkowice	10	(1)
2010–2012	Doxa Kranoula	49	(6)
2012–2013	Vyzas Megaron	22	(5)
2013–2014	Panelefsiniakos	7	(2)
2014–2016	Zakynthos	50	(7)
2016–2017	Chalkida	12	(2)
2017	Fostiras		
2017–2018	Nestos Chrysoupoli		
2018–2019	Panargiakos		
2019	Proodeftiki		
2019–2020	Stal Kraśnik	28	(11)
2020–2022	Opolanin Opole Lubelskie	66	(37)
2022–2026	Stal Kraśnik	59	(28)
2026–	GLKS Polichna	0	(0)

International career
2005–2006	Poland U19	4	(1)
- * Club domestic league appearances and goals as of 16:17, 11 March 2026 (UTC)

Kamil Król (born 20 June 1987) is a Polish professional footballer who plays as a striker for Klasa A club GLKS Polichna, where he also serves as an assistant coach.

He previously played for Górnik Zabrze, Brescia, Motor Lublin, MKS Kluczbork, Górnik Polkowice and Stal Kraśnik.

His brother Rafał plays for Stal Kraśnik.

== Honours ==
Stal Kraśnik

- IV liga Lublin: 2024–25
