= Mateusz Wyjadłowski =

Polish footballer (born 2000)

Personal information
- Full name: Mateusz Wyjadłowski
- Date of birth: 4 January 2000 (age 26)
- Place of birth: Kraków, Poland
- Height: 1.77 m (5 ft 10 in)
- Position: Midfielder

Youth career
- 2011–2012: Słomniczanka Słomniki
- 2012–2019: Wisła Kraków

Senior career*
Years	Team	Apps	(Gls)
2019	→ Soła Oświęcim (loan)	17	(2)
2019–2020	Garbarnia Kraków	30	(2)
2020–2023	Jagiellonia Białystok	3	(0)
2021	→ Puszcza Niepołomice (loan)	11	(2)
2021–2022	→ Stal Mielec (loan)	3	(0)
2022	→ Hutnik Kraków (loan)	12	(1)
2022	→ Motor Lublin (loan)	4	(0)
2023	Wisła Sandomierz	16	(4)
2023–2024	Podlasie Biała Podlaska	32	(8)
2024–2025	Stal Kraśnik	47	(9)
- * Club domestic league appearances and goals as of 23:26, 7 February 2026 (UTC)

Mateusz Wyjadłowski (born 4 January 2000) is a Polish professional footballer who plays as a midfielder.

== Honours ==
Stal Kraśnik

- IV liga Lublin: 2024–25
