= Rafał Król =

Polish footballer (born 1989)

Personal information
- Date of birth: 16 January 1989 (age 37)
- Place of birth: Kraśnik, Poland
- Height: 1.83 m (6 ft 0 in)
- Position: Midfielder

Team information
- Current team: Lublinianka

Youth career
- MUKS Kraśnik

Senior career*
Years	Team	Apps	(Gls)
- Unia Wilkołaz
2005	Janowianka Janów Lubelski		
2006–2007	Stal Kraśnik		
2008–2010	Motor Lublin	69	(7)
2010–2011	Znicz Pruszków	14	(0)
2011–2013	AÉ Dóxa Kranoúlas	16	(3)
2013–2016	Motor Lublin	93	(13)
2017–2020	Stal Kraśnik	88	(71)
2020–2025	Motor Lublin	105	(20)
2025–2026	Stal Kraśnik	48	(13)
2026–	Lublinianka	0	(0)
- * Club domestic league appearances and goals as of 22:19, 3 June 2026 (UTC)

Rafał Król (born 16 January 1989) is a Polish professional footballer who plays as a midfielder for IV liga Lublin club Lublinianka. A long-time captain of Motor Lublin, he also played for Stal Kraśnik, Znicz Pruszków and AÉ Dóxa Kranoúlas.

== Career ==
=== Early career ===
Król started his playing career in MUKS Kraśnik. He joined Motor Lublin at age nineteen, and he made his senior debut on 16 March 2008 in a 4–0 home win against GKS Jastrzębie, coming on as a substitute in the 89th minute. In August 2010, Król moved to Znicz Pruszków. In August 2011, he joined Greek Gamma Ethniki side AÉ Dóxa Kranoúlas. After three seasons, he returned to Motor.

=== Stal Kraśnik (2017–2020) ===
In February 2017, he re-joined IV liga club Stal Kraśnik. He scored six goals in a 14–0 home win over LKS Milanów on 4 June 2017.

=== Motor Lublin (2020–2025) ===
On 15 January 2020, Król signed a contract with Motor Lublin for the third time in his career.

On 26 July 2024, Król made his Ekstraklasa debut at the age of 35 years and 187 days, coming on as a substitute in a 0–2 away win over Lechia Gdańsk. With this appearance, he achieved a feat of featuring for Motor in top four tiers of the Polish league system. On 8 January 2025, Motor announced Król's decision to leave the club with immediate effect. He made 290 appearances throughout eleven years in Motor and played three matches in Ekstraklasa during the 2024–25 season.

=== Third stint at Stal Kraśnik ===
On 11 January 2025, he returned to Stal Kraśnik on a two-and-a-half-year contract.

=== Lublinianka ===
On 24 July 2026, Król moved to fifth-tier side Lublinianka.

== Honours ==
Motor Lublin

- III liga: 2015–16 (Lublin-Subcarpathia), 2019–20 (group IV)
- Polish Cup (Lublin subdistrict regionals): 2014–15, 2015–16

Stal Kraśnik

- IV liga Lublin: 2017–18, 2024–25

Individual

- III liga, group IV top scorer: 2019–20
