= 2019–20 I liga =

Polish football season

I liga
- Season: 2019–20
- Dates: 26 July 2019 – 31 July 2020
- Champions: Stal Mielec
- Promoted: Stal Mielec; Podbeskidzie Bielsko-Biała; Warta Poznań
- Relegated: Olimpia Grudziądz; Chojniczanka Chojnice; Wigry Suwałki
- Matches: 306
- Goals: 810 (2.65 per match)
- Top goalscorer: Fabian Piasecki (17 goals)
- Biggest home win: Olimpia 5–0 Chrobry (26 July 2019)
- Biggest away win: Olimpia 0–5 Stal (1 March 2020)
- Highest scoring: Olimpia 3–5 Chojniczanka (9 August 2019); Sandecja 4–4 Chojniczanka (11 October 2019); Zagłębie 3–5 Puszcza (7 March 2020)
- Longest winning run: 6 matches Radomiak Radom
- Longest unbeaten run: 12 matches Podbeskidzie Bielsko-Biała
- Longest winless run: 11 matches Odra Opole; Wigry Suwałki
- Longest losing run: 5 matches Chrobry Głogów; Chojniczanka Chojnice; Wigry Suwałki (two times); GKS Jastrzębie
- Highest attendance: 5,344; Podbeskidzie 4–1 Zagłębie (16 November 2019)
- Lowest attendance: 0 (Note: Matches have been played behind closed doors without any spectators.) (37 matches due to the COVID-19 pandemic) (Note: All matches of 23–26 round and one match of 27 round have been played behind closed doors without any spectators (until 19 June 2020).)
- Total attendance: 456,250 (Note: Selected matches of 27–34 round have been played with "no more than 25 percent of the number of seats allocated to the public".)
- Average attendance: Before COVID-19 pandemic: 2,003 (Note: The average league attendance was 2,003 after 198 matches prior to fixtures being played behind closed doors without any spectators.) ▲6,0% Season average attendance: 1,491 ▼21,1%

The 2019–20 I liga (currently named Fortuna I liga due to sponsorship reasons) was the 72nd season of the second tier domestic division in the Polish football league system since its establishment in 1949 and the 12th season of the Polish I liga under its current title. The league was operated by the PZPN. The league was contested by 18 teams. The regular season was played in a round-robin tournament. The season started on 26 July 2019 and concluded on 26 July 2020 (regular season). On 13 March 2020, the PZPN suspended the league due to the outbreak of COVID-19 pandemic. After consultation with the Polish government, the league resumed behind closed doors without any spectators on 2 June 2020.

== Changes from last season ==
The following teams have changed division since the 2018–19 season.

=== To I liga ===
Relegated from 2018–19 Ekstraklasa

- Miedź Legnica
- Zagłębie Sosnowiec

Promoted from 2018–19 II liga

- Radomiak Radom
- Olimpia Grudziądz
- GKS Bełchatów

=== From I liga ===
Promoted to 2019–20 Ekstraklasa

- Raków Częstochowa
- ŁKS Łódź

Relegated to 2019–20 II liga

- Bytovia Bytów
- GKS Katowice
- Garbarnia Kraków

== Team overview ==
Location of teams and stadiums in 2019–20 I liga.

=== Stadiums and locations ===
Team	Location	Stadium	Capacity
Bruk-Bet Termalica Nieciecza	Nieciecza	Stadion Sportowy Bruk-Bet Termalica	4,666
Chojniczanka Chojnice	Chojnice	Stadion Miejski Chojniczanka 1930	3,000
Chrobry Głogów	Głogów	Stadion GOS	2,817
GKS Bełchatów	Bełchatów	GIEKSA Arena	5,264
GKS Jastrzębie	Jastrzębie-Zdrój	Stadion Miejski	5,650
GKS Tychy	Tychy	Stadion Tychy	15,150
Miedź Legnica	Legnica	Stadion Orła Białego	6,864
Odra Opole	Opole	Stadion Odry	4,560
Olimpia Grudziądz	Grudziądz	Stadion im. Bronisława Malinowskiego	5,500
Podbeskidzie Bielsko-Biała	Bielsko-Biała	Stadion BBOSiR	15,076
Puszcza Niepołomice	Niepołomice	Stadion Puszczy	2,118
Radomiak Radom	Radom	Stadion im. Braci Czachorów	4,066
Sandecja Nowy Sącz	Nowy Sącz	Stadion im. Ojca Władysława Augustynka	2,988
Stal Mielec	Mielec	Stadion MOSiR	6,864
Stomil Olsztyn	Olsztyn	Stadion OSiR	4,200
Warta Poznań	Grodzisk Wlkp.	Dyskobolia Stadium	5,383
Wigry Suwałki	Suwałki	Stadion OSiR	3,060
Zagłębie Sosnowiec	Sosnowiec	Stadion Ludowy	7,500

== Effects of the COVID-19 pandemic ==
I liga schedule changes
Round	Original dates	Revised dates
23	14–15 March	3 June (midweek)
24	21–22 March	6–7 June
25	28–29 March	13–14 June
26	4–5 April	17–18 June
27	11 April	20–21 June
28	18–19 April	27–28 June
29	25–26 April	1 July (midweek)
30	2–3 May	4–5 July
31	9–10 May	11–12 July
32	16–17 May	16 July (midweek)
33	23–24 May	19 July
34	30–31 May	25–26 July

== League table ==
Pos	Team	Pld	W	D	L	GF	GA	GD	Pts	Promotion or Relegation
1	Stal Mielec (C, P)	34	21	4	9	57	31	+26	67	Promotion to Ekstraklasa
2	Podbeskidzie Bielsko-Biała (P)	34	19	8	7	64	35	+29	65	Promotion to Ekstraklasa
3	Warta Poznań (P)	34	18	6	10	52	35	+17	60	Qualification for Promotion play-offs
4	Radomiak Radom	34	16	9	9	52	45	+7	57	Qualification for Promotion play-offs
5	Miedź Legnica	34	14	9	11	49	44	+5	51	Qualification for Promotion play-offs
6	Nieciecza	34	14	8	12	47	34	+13	50	Qualification for Promotion play-offs
7	Chrobry Głogów	34	14	7	13	41	44	−3	49	
8	Puszcza Niepołomice	34	13	9	12	36	37	−1	48	
9	GKS Tychy	34	12	11	11	60	53	+7	47	
10	Stomil Olsztyn	34	13	7	14	30	38	−8	46	
11	Zagłębie Sosnowiec	34	12	8	14	49	55	−6	44 (Note: Head-to-head record: Zagłębie 3-1 Sandecja, Sandecja 1-1 Zagłębie)	
12	Sandecja Nowy Sącz	34	12	8	14	45	49	−4	44	
13	Odra Opole	34	11	9	14	33	39	−6	42	
14	Jastrzębie	34	9	14	11	41	46	−5	41	
15	Bełchatów	34	11	7	16	36	45	−9	40 (Note: Head-to-head record: Bełchatów 1-0 Olimpia, Olimpia 1-2 Bełchatów)	
16	Olimpia Grudziądz (R)	34	11	7	16	45	56	−11	40	Relegation to II liga
17	Chojniczanka Chojnice (R)	34	8	6	20	46	67	−21	30	Relegation to II liga
18	Wigry Suwałki (R)	34	7	5	22	27	57	−30	26	Relegation to II liga

Source: 1 liga, 90minut
Rules for classification: 1) Points; 2) Head-to-head points; 3) Head-to-head goal difference; 4) Head-to-head away goals scored (only if two teams); 5) Goal difference; 6) Goals scored; 7) Games won; 8) Away games won; 9) PZPN draw.
(C) Champions; (P) Promoted; (R) Relegated

== Positions by round ==
Team ╲ Round	1	2	3	4	5	6	7	8	9	10	11	12	13	14	15	16	17	18	19	20	21	22	23	24	25	26	27	28	29	30	31	32	33	34
Stal	4	6	11	8	4	1	1	1	6	3	4	3	4	3	5	6	4	4	3	2	2	3	3	3	3	2	3	2	1	2	2	2	2	1
Podbeskidzie	6	7	2	3	9	5	6	11	2	4	5	4	3	4	3	2	2	2	2	3	3	1	1	1	1	1	1	1	2	1	1	1	1	2
Warta	14	9	5	2	1	2	3	4	1	1	1	2	1	1	2	1	1	1	1	1	1	2	2	2	2	3	2	3	3	3	3	3	3	3
Radomiak	4	3	7	9	10	12	5	2	3	2	2	1	2	2	1	3	3	3	4	4	4	4	4	4	4	4	4	4	4	4	4	4	4	4
Miedź	10	7	3	5	3	6	2	3	7	7	8	6	9	5	6	4	5	7	8	6	8	6	6	6	6	5	6	5	5	5	5	5	5	5
Bruk-Bet Termalica	2	2	1	1	5	9	10	12	12	12	10	8	10	8	9	9	10	10	9	10	11	10	8	9	10	7	5	6	7	7	6	6	6	6
Chrobry	18	18	18	18	18	18	17	17	17	17	17	17	17	17	15	15	15	15	15	15	14	13	14	12	14	14	16	16	12	8	8	9	7	7
Puszcza	10	5	9	6	12	7	13	5	10	9	13	14	15	13	14	14	14	14	14	14	15	14	13	13	11	11	13	10	14	9	7	7	8	8
GKS Tychy	14	15	12	16	16	11	11	14	4	8	9	10	7	10	10	8	7	6	6	8	6	8	10	11	13	10	11	7	6	6	9	8	9	9
Stomil	16	16	13	12	6	8	12	6	5	5	3	7	5	9	7	10	11	12	13	11	10	12	12	14	12	13	12	13	8	11	12	12	11	10
Zagłębie	6	12	16	15	8	14	7	9	15	15	15	11	12	11	11	12	9	11	12	9	9	9	11	8	9	12	9	11	11	14	16	10	13	11
Sandecja	16	16	13	11	14	10	15	13	14	14	12	12	14	16	12	13	12	13	10	12	12	11	9	10	7	8	10	12	13	15	10	11	10	12
Odra	10	14	17	17	17	17	18	18	18	18	18	18	18	18	18	18	18	17	17	16	16	16	16	16	16	16	15	15	16	16	13	16	12	13
GKS Jastrzębie	10	4	8	13	13	13	8	10	8	6	7	9	8	5	4	4	5	5	5	7	5	5	5	5	5	6	7	8	9	12	14	13	15	14
GKS Bełchatów	2	10	4	4	2	4	9	8	16	16	14	15	11	12	13	11	13	9	11	13	13	15	15	15	15	15	14	14	15	10	11	14	14	15
Olimpia	1	1	6	10	15	16	14	15	9	10	6	5	6	7	8	7	8	8	7	5	7	7	7	7	8	9	8	9	10	13	15	15	16	16
Chojniczanka	6	12	10	7	11	15	16	16	11	13	11	13	13	14	16	16	16	18	18	18	18	18	18	17	17	17	17	17	18	17	17	17	17	17
Wigry	6	11	15	13	7	3	4	7	13	11	16	16	16	15	17	17	17	16	16	17	17	17	17	18	18	18	18	18	17	18	18	18	18	18

I liga champion Promotion to 2020–21 Ekstraklasa
Promotion to 2020–21 Ekstraklasa
Qualification for promotion play-offs
Relegation to 2020–21 II liga

Source: 90minut.pl

== Results ==
Home \ Away	BEŁ	CCH	GŁO	JAS	MLE	NIE	ODR	GRU	POD	PNI	RAD	SNS	STA	STO	TYC	WAR	WIG	ZSO
Bełchatów	—	1–1	1–2	0–0	1–1	0–2	1–0	1–0	1–1	0–0	3–0	0–3	2–1	3–0	1–4	1–2	3–0	2–1
Chojniczanka Chojnice	3–0	—	3–4	3–1	0–3	1–0	1–2	1–3	0–1	0–1	1–3	2–1	0–2	1–3	1–1	1–2	1–3	1–3
Chrobry Głogów	1–0	1–0	—	0–0	0–2	0–1	3–2	2–2	1–1	0–1	0–2	1–0	1–0	0–0	5–1	0–0	4–1	3–0
Jastrzębie	1–1	1–3	1–0	—	2–2	0–0	2–0	2–0	0–3	1–1	3–2	1–2	1–2	1–2	2–1	1–2	1–0	1–3
Miedź Legnica	3–0	5–2	2–1	1–1	—	0–1	0–0	2–2	2–2	1–0	3–1	1–3	1–2	4–1	2–2	0–0	2–1	0–2
Nieciecza	2–1	1–2	4–0	2–2	0–1	—	1–0	3–3	2–2	1–3	1–1	3–0	1–2	2–0	4–3	1–1	1–0	2–0
Odra Opole	1–0	0–0	1–0	1–2	3–0	2–0	—	1–0	0–2	0–1	0–0	1–1	1–0	0–1	0–0	2–0	1–0	1–1
Olimpia Grudziądz	1–2	3–5	5–0	0–0	1–2	1–0	3–1	—	1–2	1–1	2–2	0–0	0–5	1–0	2–4	2–1	1–2	2–1
Podbeskidzie Bielsko-Biała	4–0	2–1	0–1	0–2	2–1	1–0	4–3	2–1	—	2–2	4–2	3–1	4–1	2–0	2–2	2–0	4–0	4–1
Puszcza Niepołomice	1–4	1–0	1–3	0–0	0–1	0–3	1–2	0–1	0–1	—	4–0	1–2	0–1	0–0	2–1	0–2	2–1	0–2
Radomiak Radom	2–0	3–1	2–0	2–2	3–0	1–0	0–0	2–0	1–3	1–1	—	1–0	2–0	2–1	2–1	0–2	3–1	2–1
Sandecja Nowy Sącz	2–1	4–4	3–2	1–1	1–2	2–2	1–1	3–1	1–0	0–1	1–2	—	2–1	3–0	1–0	1–2	1–0	1–1
Stal Mielec	1–0	4–1	1–0	3–1	1–0	0–3	1–1	2–0	2–1	0–0	2–0	5–1	—	1–0	1–2	2–1	1–1	1–1
Stomil Olsztyn	0–1	1–0	0–0	2–1	1–2	1–1	4–2	2–0	1–0	0–0	0–0	1–0	1–0	—	2–1	1–3	1–0	1–3
Tychy 71	1–0	1–2	5–1	2–2	4–1	1–0	4–1	2–3	1–1	0–1	2–2	2–2	2–4	1–0	—	1–1	2–1	1–1
Warta Poznań	1–0	2–0	1–2	1–1	2–1	1–3	3–0	2–0	2–1	1–2	3–0	2–0	0–2	1–2	2–2	—	3–0	2–3
Wigry Suwałki	2–4	1–1	1–1	2–0	1–1	1–0	1–0	1–2	1–0	2–3	1–4	1–0	0–3	0–0	0–1	1–2	—	0–2
Zagłębie Sosnowiec	1–1	3–3	0–2	2–4	1–0	1–0	1–3	0–1	1–1	3–5	2–2	3–1	0–3	2–1	1–2	0–2	2–0	—

Source: 1 liga
Legend: Blue = home team win; Yellow = draw; Red = away team win.
For upcoming matches, an "a" indicates there is an article about the rivalry between the two participants.

== Results by round ==
Team ╲ Round	1	2	3	4	5	6	7	8	9	10	11	12	13	14	15	16	17	18	19	20	21	22	23	24	25	26	27	28	29	30	31	32	33	34
Bruk-Bet Termalica	W	W	W	L	L	L	D	D	L	L	W	W	D	W	L	D	L	D	W	L	L	W	W	L	D	W	W	L	L	W	W	D	D	W
Chojniczanka	D	L	W	W	L	L	D	L	W	L	W	L	D	L	D	L	L	L	L	L	W	L	L	W	L	D	L	W	D	W	L	L	L	L
Chrobry	L	L	L	L	L	D	W	L	L	W	L	D	W	W	W	D	D	L	D	L	W	W	D	W	L	D	L	W	W	W	W	L	W	W
GKS Bełchatów	W	L	W	D	W	L	L	D	L	L	W	L	W	L	D	W	L	W	L	L	D	L	L	L	W	D	W	W	D	W	L	L	D	L
GKS Jastrzębie	D	W	L	D	D	D	W	D	W	W	L	L	W	W	W	D	D	D	D	L	D	W	L	W	L	D	L	L	L	L	L	D	D	D
GKS Tychy	L	L	W	L	W	W	D	W	W	D	L	L	L	W	D	W	W	D	D	D	D	L	D	L	L	W	D	W	W	D	L	D	L	W
Miedź	D	W	W	L	W	L	W	D	L	W	L	W	W	L	D	W	D	L	L	W	L	W	L	D	D	W	L	D	W	D	W	W	L	D
Odra	D	L	L	L	L	D	L	D	L	L	D	W	L	W	L	L	W	W	W	D	L	W	D	L	W	D	W	W	D	D	W	L	W	L
Olimpia	W	W	L	L	L	L	W	D	W	D	W	W	L	D	L	W	L	W	D	W	L	W	L	L	D	L	W	L	L	L	L	D	L	D
Podbeskidzie	D	W	W	L	L	W	D	W	W	D	L	W	W	L	W	W	D	W	W	L	W	W	W	W	D	D	D	W	D	W	W	W	L	L
Puszcza	D	W	L	W	L	W	L	W	L	D	L	L	W	L	D	L	D	L	D	W	L	W	W	D	W	D	L	W	L	W	W	D	D	W
Radomiak	W	W	L	L	D	D	W	W	W	W	W	W	L	D	W	L	D	D	D	W	L	L	D	W	W	D	W	L	W	L	W	D	W	L
Sandecja	L	L	W	W	L	W	L	D	D	L	W	L	D	L	W	L	W	D	W	L	D	W	W	L	W	D	L	L	D	L	W	L	W	D
Stal	W	D	L	W	W	W	W	L	L	W	L	W	W	L	L	D	W	W	W	W	W	L	W	D	W	W	L	W	W	D	L	W	W	W
Stomil	L	L	W	W	W	D	L	W	W	D	W	L	D	L	D	L	L	L	D	W	W	L	D	L	W	L	W	L	W	L	L	D	W	W
Warta	L	W	W	W	W	D	L	D	W	W	W	D	L	W	D	W	W	L	W	W	W	L	W	W	L	L	W	D	L	L	W	D	W	L
Wigry	D	D	L	W	W	W	L	L	L	D	L	L	W	L	L	D	L	W	L	L	L	L	L	D	L	L	L	L	L	W	L	W	L	L
Zagłębie	D	L	L	W	W	L	W	D	L	L	D	W	W	L	D	D	W	L	L	W	W	L	D	W	L	D	W	L	D	L	L	W	L	W

Source: 1 liga
W = Win; D = Draw; L = Loss

== Promotion play-offs ==
I liga play-offs for the 2019–20 season will be played in July 2020. The teams who finished in 3rd, 4th, 5th and 6th place are set to compete. I liga play-offs will be held for the first time in this format. The fixtures are determined by final league position – 3rd team of regular season vs 6th team of regular season and 4th team of regular season vs 5th team of regular season. The winner of final match will be promoted to Ekstraklasa for next season. All matches will be played in a stadiums of team which occupied higher position in regular season.

Semi-finals; 28 July
3	Warta Poznań	1
6	Bruk-Bet Termalica Nieciecza	0
4	Radomiak Radom	3
5	Miedź Legnica	1

Final; 31 July
3	Warta Poznań	2
4	Radomiak Radom	0

28 July 2020
17:10 CEST

Radomiak Radom	3–1	Miedź Legnica
Nowak 39'; Leândro 67' (pen.); Banasiak 88'	Report	Śliwa 86'

Stadion Miejski, Radom
Attendance: 1,910 (Note: Match have been played with "no more than 25 percent of the number of seats allocated to the public" due to the COVID-19 pandemic.)
Referee: Jarosław Przybył (Kluczbork)
28 July 2020
20:40 CEST

Warta Poznań	1–0	Bruk-Bet Termalica Nieciecza
Jakóbowski 61'	Report

Dyskobolia Stadium, Grodzisk Wlkp.
Attendance: 837 (Note: Match have been played with "no more than 25 percent of the number of seats allocated to the public" due to the COVID-19 pandemic.)
Referee: Sebastian Jarzębak (Bytom)

31 July 2020
17:40 CEST

Warta Poznań	2–0	Radomiak Radom
Kupczak 67' (pen.), 83' (pen.)	Report

Dyskobolia Stadium, Grodzisk Wlkp.
Attendance: 912 (Note: Match have been played with "no more than 25 percent of the number of seats allocated to the public" due to the COVID-19 pandemic.)
Referee: Bartosz Frankowski (Toruń)

== Top goalscorers ==
Rank	Player	Club	Goals
1	(Poland) Fabian Piasecki	Zagłębie Sosnowiec	17
2	(Poland) Mateusz Kuzimski	Chojniczanka Chojnice	15
3	(Poland) Patryk Mikita	Radomiak Radom	14
4	(Poland) Karol Danielak	Podbeskidzie Bielsko-Biała	13
4	(Poland) Bartosz Nowak	Stal Mielec	13
6	(Latvia) Vladislavs Gutkovskis	Bruk-Bet Termalica Nieciecza	12
6	(Afghanistan) Omran Haydary	Olimpia Grudziądz	12
8	(Brazil) João Augusto	Olimpia Grudziądz	11
8	(Poland) Mateusz Kupczak	Warta Poznań	11
8	(Poland) Mateusz Marzec	GKS Bełchatów	11
8	(Croatia) Marko Roginić	Podbeskidzie Bielsko-Biała	11

== Attendances ==
Pos	Team	Total	High	Low	Average	Change
1	Podbeskidzie Bielsko-Biała	57,297	5,344	0	3,800	+74.7%
2	GKS Tychy	44,479	5,236	0	3,200	−22.6%
3	Radomiak Radom	44,474	4,072	0	3,200	+15.5%^{2}
4	Stal Mielec	44,334	4,558	0	3,000	−5.1%
5	Miedź Legnica	40,394	4,447	0	2,700	−45.6%^{1}
6	Stomil Olsztyn	26,952	2,579	0	1,800	−9.8%
7	Bruk-Bet Termalica Nieciecza	24,434	4,024	0	1,600	+11.4%
8	Zagłębie Sosnowiec	23,252	3,103	0	1,600	−50.1%^{1}
9	GKS Bełchatów	20,776	2,610	0	1,500	+1.1%^{2}
10	GKS Jastrzębie	22,059	2,541	0	1,500	−27.0%
11	Wigry Suwałki	16,774	2,096	0	1,100	−2.5%
12	Odra Opole	15,370	1,548	0	1,000	−35.3%
13	Sandecja Nowy Sącz	15,357	2,380	0	1,000	−47.9%
14	Chojniczanka Chojnice	15,698	1,735	0	900	−36.0%
15	Olimpia Grudziądz	13,366	2,200	0	900	−32.4%^{2}
16	Warta Poznań (Note: Due to the renovation of the Dębińska Road Stadium match played at the Dyskobolia Stadium in Grodzisk Wielkopolski.)	10,622	1,352	0	700	−11.5%
17	Chrobry Głogów	10,485	1,398	0	700	−3.3%
18	Puszcza Niepołomice	10,127	1,380	0	700	−9.7%
	League total	456,250	5,344	0	1,491	−21.1%

Updated to games played on 25 July 2020.
Source: 90minut (in Polish)
Notes:
1. Team played last season in Ekstraklasa.
2. Team played last season in II liga.

== See also ==
- 2019–20 Ekstraklasa
- 2019–20 II liga
- 2019–20 III liga
- 2019–20 Polish Cup
