= Krzysztof Ropski =

Polish footballer (born 1996)

Personal information
- Date of birth: 14 September 1996 (age 30)
- Place of birth: Tarnów, Poland
- Height: 1.90 m (6 ft 3 in)
- Position: Striker

Team information
- Current team: Świt Szczecin
- Number: 9

Youth career
- –2008: Tuchovia Tuchów
- 2008–2010: Unia Tarnów
- 2010–2013: Cracovia

Senior career*
Years	Team	Apps	(Gls)
2013–2014	Cracovia II		
2014–2016	Unia Tarnów	30	(6)
2015–2016	→ Radomiak Radom (loan)	26	(1)
2016–2019	Siarka Tarnobrzeg	103	(31)
2020–2021	Motor Lublin	33	(5)
2022–2023	Skra Częstochowa	20	(3)
2023–2024	Polonia Bytom	31	(7)
2024–	Świt Szczecin	74	(29)
- * Club domestic league appearances and goals as of 19:03, 31 May 2026 (UTC)

Krzysztof Ropski (born 14 September 1996) is a Polish professional footballer who plays as a striker for II liga club Świt Szczecin. He has previously played for clubs such as Radomiak Radom, Siarka Tarnobrzeg, Motor Lublin, Skra Częstochowa and Polonia Bytom.

== Club career ==
Ropski started his career in IV liga club Tuchovia Tuchów. He spent the next few years at youth level, playing for Unia Tarnów, and Cracovia. In August 2014, Ropski joined his hometown club Unia Tarnów at age 17. He made his debut for Unia on 13 August 2014, starting and playing 70 minutes in a 2–1 away win against Wierna Małogoszcz. In the 2014–15 season, he made 30 appearances for Unia, scoring six goals.

In July 2015, Ropski joined II liga club Radomiak Radom on loan, and he made his professional debut on 2 August 2015, during the opening game of the 2015–16 season in a 0–0 home draw against Znicz Pruszków He scored one goal for Radomiak in a 2–0 win at home against Błękitni Stargard Szczeciński.

On 16 July 2016, Ropski signed a two-year contract with II liga side Siarka Tarnobrzeg. On 23 October 2016, he scored on his debut for Siarka in a 2–2 draw against Gryf Wejherowo. On 23 November 2016, in the last game before the winter break, Ropski scored two late goals to give Siarka a 3–2 win over Puszcza Niepołomice. Ropski spent three-and-a-half years with Siarka, scoring 31 goals in 103 league games.

On 20 January 2020, Ropski signed a contract with Motor Lublin. On 30 December 2021, his contract was terminated by mutual consent.

== Honours ==
Motor Lublin

- III liga, group IV: 2019–20

Polonia Bytom

- III liga, group III: 2022–23
- Polish Cup (Silesia regionals): 2022–23

Świt Szczecin

- III liga, group II: 2023–24
- Polish Cup (West Pomerania regionals): 2023–24

Individual

- III liga, group IV top scorer: 2019–20
