= Chełmianka Chełm =

Polish football club

ChKS Chełmianka Chełm
- Full name: Chełmski Klub Sportowy Chełmianka Chełm
- Nickname: Chełmian Hussars (Chełmska Husaria)
- Founded: 20 August 1955; 70 years ago (as MZKS Start)
- Ground: Municipal Stadium
- Capacity: 3,280
- Chairman: Grzegorz Stawinoga
- Manager: Ireneusz Pietrzykowski
- League: III liga, group IV
- 2025–26: III liga, group IV, 3rd of 18
- Website: chelmianka.pl
Home colours	Away colours

Chełmianka Chełm is a Polish football club from Chełm, Lublin Voivodeship. They currently compete in group IV of the III liga, the fourth tier of the Polish football league system. The club has traditional colors of Chełm Land white and green.

== History ==
The club was founded in 1955 through the merger of several smaller football clubs operating in Chełm. Until 1992, the club officially carried the prefix Robotniczy Klub Sportowy, the Workers Sports Club, a prefix with which the fans still identify with. Since 1959, the club benefited from the PKWM Stadium (currently called the Municipal Stadium). In the summer of 1961, the merging of local clubs into one side continued and Chełmianka merged with local amateur club Kolejarz Chełm.

In 1974, the club was officially taken in by the newly formed Chełm Footwear Market (Chełmskie Zakłady Obuwia in Polish, ChZO for short). Despite the increase in funding for Chełmianka players, they never managed to play higher than the third division, suffering two relatively insignificant further mergers with lower league sides LZS Gryf Chełm and RKS Rejowiec.

In 1992, the club was on the edge of bankruptcy but the ChZO continued to fund the club. The team was withdrawn from competition and merged with the Polish Border Guard club Gwardia Chełm, with the new club called Granica meaning "Border", which started competing in the fourth division. Games were moved to Gwardia's old stadium, the Lublin Street Stadium, however the venue fell into disrepair. Soon, the club MKS Granica was handed over the city of Chełm by their owners, the Polish Border Guards, in 1999. In the spring of 1998, football competitions returned to the city stadium. After the 1998–99 season, the club was relegated from the fourth division.

In light of the financial difficulties, it was decided to create the "Chełm Sports Club" (Chełmski Klub Sportowy) to replace MKS Granica. Under this new name, the club performed in the fifth tier until 2001. Upon promotion to the fourth league, the club returned to its historical name "Chełmianka".

== Name changes ==
- 1955–1956: Międzyzakładowy Klub Sportowy „Start” Chełm
- 1957–1959: Miejski Klub Sportowy „Chełmianka” Chełm
- 1960–1961: Spółdzielczy Klub Sportowy „Chełmianka” Chełm
- 1961–1969: (summer 1961 r. – merger with amateur club „Kolejarz” Chełm) Kolejowy Klub Sportowy „Chełmianka” Chełm
- 1969–1974: Klub Sportowy Federacji Budowlanych „Chełmianka” Chełm
- 1974–1975: (2 January 1974 r. – merger with LZS „Gryf” Chełm) Robotniczo-Ludowy Klub Sportowy „Zjednoczeni” Chełm
- 1976–1992: (6 January 1976 r. – merger with RKS Rejowiec) Robotniczy Klub Sportowy „Chełmianka” Chełm
- 1992–1999: (13 July 1992 r. – merger with KS „Gwardia” Chełm) Miejski Klub Sportowy „Granica” Chełm
- 1999–2000: (15 July 1999 r. creation of Chełm Klub Sportowy) „CHKS” Chełm
- 2001–current: Chełmski Klub Sportowy „Chełmianka” Chełm

== Fans ==
The start of organised support in Chełm reaches as early as the mid 70's, when locals started supporting the local team as the club started to rise up the leagues. The club has currently two groups, Young Fighters Clan’06 and Spiryt Brigade and the ultras stand usually consists of 80–150 fans with that number rising to around 250 for more important matches.

The fans have good relations with fans of Motor Lublin and Górnik Łęczna, with the friendship with Motor dating as far back as 1981. They have rivalries with the following local rivals: Avia Świdnik, Unia Hrubieszów, Hetman Zamość, Wisła Puławy, Łada Biłgoraj and Orlęta Łuków.

== Honours ==
- II liga
  - 7th place: 1976–77, 1982–83
- Polish Cup
  - Round of 16: 2019–20
