= Mateusz Żebrowski =

Polish footballer (born 1995)

Personal information
- Date of birth: 5 July 1995 (age 31)
- Place of birth: Ostrołęka, Poland
- Height: 1.87 m (6 ft 2 in)
- Position: Forward

Youth career
- –2009: Korona Ostrołęka
- 2009–2011: Polonia Warsaw
- 2011–2012: Mazur Karczew
- 2012–2013: Legia Warsaw

Senior career*
Years	Team	Apps	(Gls)
2012	Mazur Karczew	7	(0)
2013–2014	Jagiellonia Białystok	1	(0)
2014–2016	Wigry Suwałki	54	(5)
2017–2018	Legionovia Legionowo	24	(9)
2018–2020	KKS 1925 Kalisz	48	(31)
2021–2023	Arka Gdynia	72	(11)
2023–2024	KKS 1925 Kalisz	22	(3)
2024–2025	Mazur Karczew	8	(4)
2025–2026	KP Starogard Gdański	21	(16)

International career
2012–2013	Poland U18	6	(1)
2012	Poland U19	6	(0)
- * Club domestic league appearances and goals as of 16:22, 9 July 2026 (UTC)

Mateusz Żebrowski (born 5 July 1995) is a Polish professional footballer who plays as a forward.

== Honours ==
Wigry Suwałki

- II liga East: 2013–14

KKS 1925 Kalisz

- III liga, group II: 2019–20
- Polish Cup (Kalisz regionals): 2018–19

Individual

- III liga, group II top scorer: 2019–20
