= 2019–20 Ekstraklasa =

94th season of top-tier football league in Poland

Ekstraklasa
- Season: 2019–20
- Dates: 19 July 2019 – 19 July 2020
- Champions: Legia Warsaw (14th title)
- Relegated: Arka Gdynia; Korona Kielce; ŁKS Łódź
- Champions League: Legia Warsaw
- Europa League: Lech Poznań; Piast Gliwice; Cravovia (via Polish Cup)
- Matches: 296
- Goals: 767 (2.59 per match)
- Top goalscorer: Christian Gytkjær (24 goals)
- Best goalkeeper: František Plach (15 clean sheets)
- Biggest home win: Legia 7–0 Wisła K. (27 October 2019)
- Biggest away win: Arka 0–3 Jagiellonia (19 July 2019); Zagłębie 0–3 Piast (25 August 2019); ŁKS 1–4 Arka (21 September 2019); Piast 0–3 Śląsk (30 November 2019); Śląsk 0–3 Legia (8 December 2019); Lechia 0–3 Raków (21 December 2019); Pogoń 0–3 Zagłębie (29 May 2020); Wisła P. 1–4 Korona (31 May 2020); ŁKS 0–3 Jagiellonia (10 June 2020); Korona 0–3 Lech (14 June 2020); Lechia 0–3 Cracovia (4 July 2020)
- Highest scoring: Śląsk 4–4 Zagłębie (21 September 2019); Zagłębie 4–4 Lechia (7 March 2020)
- Longest winning run: 6 matches Wisła Płock
- Longest unbeaten run: 10 matches Lech Poznań
- Longest winless run: 11 matches Górnik Zabrze; Wisła Kraków
- Longest losing run: 10 matches Wisła Kraków
- Highest attendance: 33,000; Wisła K. 0–1 Cracovia (29 September 2019)
- Lowest attendance: 0 (Note: Match have been played behind closed doors without any spectators.); Śląsk 1–1 Lech (14 December 2019) and 32 matches due to the COVID-19 pandemic (Note: All matches of 27–30 round have been played behind closed doors without any spectators (until 19 June 2020).)
- Total attendance: 2,014,904 (Note: All matches of 31–37 round have been played with "no more than 25 percent of the number of seats allocated to the public".)
- Average attendance: Before COVID-19 pandemic: 8,987 (Note: The average league attendance was 8,987 after 208 matches prior to fixtures being played behind closed doors without any spectators.) ▲2,0% Season average attendance: 6,807 ▼22,7%

The 2019–20 Ekstraklasa (also known as PKO Bank Polski Ekstraklasa due to its sponsorship by PKO Bank Polski) was the 94th season of the Polish Football Championship, the 86th season of the highest tier domestic division in the Polish football league system since its establishment in 1927 and the 12th season of the Ekstraklasa under its current title. The league was operated by the Ekstraklasa SA.

The regular season was played as a round-robin tournament. A total of 16 teams participated, 14 of which competed in the league during the previous season, while the remaining two were promoted from the 2018–19 I liga. It is the third Ekstraklasa season to use VAR. The season started on 19 July 2019 and concluded on 19 July 2020 (the fixtures were announced on 3 June 2019 and revised on 13 May 2020 due to the outbreak of COVID-19 pandemic). After the 20th matchday the league went on a winter break between 23 December 2019 and 8 February 2020. On 13 March 2020, the Ekstraklasa SA suspended the league due to the outbreak of COVID-19 pandemic. After consultation with the Polish government, the league resumed behind closed doors without any spectators on 29 May 2020. All matches of 31–37 round have been played with "no more than 25 percent of the number of seats allocated to the public".

Each team played a total of 30 matches in the regular season, half at home and half away. After the 30th round, the league split into two groups: championship round (top eight teams) and relegation round (bottom eight teams). Each team played 7 more games (teams ranked 1 to 4 and 9 to 12 played four times at home). Therefore, each team played a total of 37 matches. The team at the top of the Championship round won the league title. However, the rules for promotion and relegation from the league have changed: starting from the 2019–20 season, three teams were relegated from Ekstraklasa to I liga, while from the I liga to Ekstraklasa two teams advanced directly, while teams from 3-6 places fought in a play-off where the winner was awarded with a promotion to Ekstraklasa.

The defending champions were Piast Gliwice, who won their 1st Polish title the previous season. The two clubs promoted were Raków Częstochowa, returning to Ekstraklasa after 21 years, as well as ŁKS Łódź, who make a return to Ekstraklasa after 7 years. Legia Warsaw clinched their fourteenth Ekstraklasa title on the twenty eight matchday of the season, after a 2–0 win against Cracovia.

== Teams ==
A total of 16 teams participated in the 2019–20 edition of the Ekstraklasa.

=== Changes from last season ===
Promoted from 2018–19 I liga	Relegated from 2018–19 Ekstraklasa
▲ Raków Częstochowa ▲ ŁKS Łódź	▼ Miedź Legnica ▼ Zagłębie Sosnowiec

=== Stadiums and locations ===
Note: Table lists in alphabetical order.

Team	Location	Venue	Capacity
Arka Gdynia	Gdynia	Stadion Arki Gdynia	15,139
Cracovia	Kraków	Stadion im. Józefa Piłsudskiego	15,114
Górnik Zabrze	Zabrze	Stadion im. Ernesta Pohla	24,563^{1}
Jagiellonia Białystok	Białystok	Stadion Jagiellonii Białystok	22,432
Korona Kielce	Kielce	Suzuki Arena	15,550
Lech Poznań	Poznań	Stadion Poznań	43,269
Lechia Gdańsk	Gdańsk	Stadion Energa Gdańsk	43,615
Legia Warsaw	Warsaw	Stadion Wojska Polskiego	31,800
ŁKS Łódź	Łódź	Stadion ŁKS	5,700
Piast Gliwice	Gliwice	Stadion Miejski im. Piotra Wieczorka	10,037
Pogoń Szczecin	Szczecin	Stadion im. Floriana Krygiera	4,200^{2}
Raków Częstochowa	Bełchatów	GIEKSA Arena^{3}	5,264
Śląsk Wrocław	Wrocław	Stadion Wrocław	45,105
Wisła Kraków	Kraków	Stadion im. Henryka Reymana	33,326
Wisła Płock	Płock	Stadion im. Kazimierza Górskiego	12,800
Zagłębie Lubin	Lubin	Stadion Zagłębia Lubin	16,068

1. Upgrading to 31,871.
2. Upgrading to 21,163.
3. Due to the renovation of the Municipal Football Stadium "Raków" in Częstochowa, Raków played home matches at the GIEKSA Arena in Bełchatów.

Arka	Cracovia	Górnik Zabrze	Jagiellonia	Korona	Lech
Stadion GOSiR	Stadion im. Józefa Piłsudskiego	Stadion im. Ernesta Pohla	Stadion Jagiellonii	Suzuki Arena	Stadion Lecha
Capacity: 15,139	Capacity: 15,114	Capacity: 24,563	Capacity: 22,432	Capacity: 15,550	Capacity: 43,269
Lechia	Location of teams in 2019–20 Ekstraklasa				Legia
Stadion Energa Gdańsk	Location of teams in 2019–20 Ekstraklasa				Stadion Wojska Polskiego
Capacity: 43,615	Location of teams in 2019–20 Ekstraklasa				Capacity: 31,800
ŁKS Łódź	Location of teams in 2019–20 Ekstraklasa				Piast
Stadion ŁKS	Location of teams in 2019–20 Ekstraklasa				Stadion Miejski im. Piotra Wieczorka
Capacity: 5,700	Location of teams in 2019–20 Ekstraklasa				Capacity: 10,037
Pogoń	Raków	Śląsk	Wisła Kraków	Wisła Płock	Zagłębie
Stadion im. Floriana Krygiera	Stadion Miejski	Stadion Wrocław	Stadion im. Henryka Reymana	Stadion im. Kazimierza Górskiego	Stadion Zagłębia
Capacity: 4,200	Capacity: 5,264	Capacity: 45,105	Capacity: 33,326	Capacity: 12,800	Capacity: 16,068

Location of teams in the Katowice urban area

=== Personnel and kits ===
Team	Chairman	Head coach	Captain	Manufacturer	Sponsors
Arka Gdynia	(Poland) Grzegorz Stańczuk	(Poland) Ireneusz Mamrot	(Poland) Adam Marciniak	Adidas	LV Bet, Gdynia
Cracovia	(Poland) Janusz Filipiak	(Poland) Michał Probierz	(Portugal) Rafael Lopes	Puma	Comarch
Górnik Zabrze	(Poland) Bartosz Sarnowski	(Poland) Marcin Brosz	(Poland) Szymon Matuszek	Adidas	Polska Grupa Górnicza
Jagiellonia Białystok	(Poland) Cezary Kulesza	(Bulgaria) Ivaylo Petev	(Poland) Taras Romanczuk	Erreà	STS, Wschodzący Białystok
Korona Kielce	(Poland) Krzysztof Zając	(Poland) Maciej Bartoszek	(Bosnia and Herzegovina) Adnan Kovačević	Puma	Suzuki
Lech Poznań	(Poland) Karol Klimczak	(Poland) Dariusz Żuraw	(Norway) Thomas Rogne	Macron	Aforti
Lechia Gdańsk	(Poland) Adam Mandziara	(Poland) Piotr Stokowiec	(Portugal) Flávio Paixão	New Balance	Energa, Paytren
Legia Warsaw	(Poland) Dariusz Mioduski	(Serbia) Aleksandar Vuković	(Poland) Artur Jędrzejczyk	Adidas	Fortuna
ŁKS Łódź	(Poland) Tomasz Salski	(Poland) Wojciech Stawowy	(Poland) Maksymilian Rozwandowicz	Adidas	forBET
Piast Gliwice	(Poland) Paweł Żelem	(Poland) Waldemar Fornalik	(Spain) Gerard Badía	Adidas	Betclic, Gliwice
Pogoń Szczecin	(Poland) Jarosław Mroczek	(Germany) Kosta Runjaić	(Poland) Adam Frączczak	Zina	Grupa Azoty, Trawnik Producent
Raków Częstochowa	(Poland) Wojciech Cygan	(Poland) Marek Papszun	(Czech Republic) Tomáš Petrášek	Hummel	x-kom
Śląsk Wrocław	(Poland) Piotr Waśniewski	(Czech Republic) Vítězslav Lavička	(Poland) Krzysztof Mączyński	Adidas	Noblebet
Wisła Kraków	(Poland) Rafał Wisłocki	(Poland) Artur Skowronek	(Poland) Jakub Błaszczykowski	Adidas	LV Bet
Wisła Płock	(Poland) Jacek Kruszewski	(Poland) Radosław Sobolewski	(Poland) Bartłomiej Sielewski	Adidas	PKN Orlen
Zagłębie Lubin	(Poland) Marcin Lewiński	(Slovakia) Martin Ševela	(Slovakia) Ľubomír Guldan	Nike	KGHM

=== Managerial changes ===
Team	Outgoing manager	Manner of departure	Date of vacancy	Position in table	Incoming manager	Date of appointment
Wisła Płock	(Poland) Leszek Ojrzyński	Resigned	27 July 2019	12th	(Poland) Patryk Kniat (interim)	27 July 2019
Wisła Płock	(Poland) Patryk Kniat	End of caretaker spell	6 August 2019	15th	(Poland) Radosław Sobolewski (Note: Sobolewski was initially appointed as interim coach, but the move was made permanent on 6 May 2020.)	6 August 2019
Korona Kielce	(Italy) Gino Lettieri	Sacked	31 August 2019	16th	(Poland) Sławomir Grzesik (interim)	31 August 2019
Zagłębie Lubin	(Netherlands) Ben van Dael	Sacked	31 August 2019	13th	(Poland) Paweł Karmelita (interim)	31 August 2019
Korona Kielce	(Poland) Sławomir Grzesik	End of caretaker spell	16 September 2019	14th	(Poland) Mirosław Smyła	16 September 2019
Zagłębie Lubin	(Poland) Paweł Karmelita	End of caretaker spell	16 September 2019	12th	(Slovakia) Martin Ševela	16 September 2019
Arka Gdynia	(Poland) Jacek Zieliński	Sacked	8 October 2019	14th	(Serbia) Aleksandar Rogić	10 October 2019
Wisła Kraków	(Poland) Maciej Stolarczyk	Sacked	14 November 2019	16th	(Poland) Artur Skowronek	14 November 2019
Jagiellonia Białystok	(Poland) Ireneusz Mamrot	Mutual consent	8 December 2019	9th	(Poland) Rafał Grzyb (interim)	8 December 2019
Jagiellonia Białystok	(Poland) Rafał Grzyb	End of caretaker spell	30 December 2019	9th	(Bulgaria) Ivaylo Petev	30 December 2019
Korona Kielce	(Poland) Mirosław Smyła	Sacked	6 March 2020	15th	(Poland) Maciej Bartoszek	6 March 2020
Arka Gdynia	(Serbia) Aleksandar Rogić	Resigned	7 March 2020	14th	(Poland) Ireneusz Mamrot	9 May 2020
ŁKS Łódź	(Poland) Kazimierz Moskal	Mutual consent	2 May 2020	16th	(Poland) Wojciech Stawowy	4 May 2020

== Effects of the COVID-19 pandemic ==
Ekstraklasa schedule changes
Round	Original dates	Revised dates
27	14–15 March	30–31 May
28	21–22 March	6–7 June
29	4–5 April	10 June (midweek)
30	11 April	14 June
31	18–19 April	20–21 June
32	22 April	24 June (midweek)
33	25–26 April	27–28 June
34	2–3 May	4–5 July
35	9–10 May	11–12 July
36	13 May	15 July (midweek)
37	16–17 May	18–19 July

From 19 June 2020, it was possible for spectators to take 25% of possible seats. This regulation come into force by matchday 31.

== Regular season ==
=== League table ===
Pos	Team	Pld	W	D	L	GF	GA	GD	Pts	Qualification
1	Legia Warsaw	30	19	3	8	63	30	+33	60	Qualification for the Championship round
2	Piast Gliwice	30	16	5	9	36	26	+10	53	Qualification for the Championship round
3	Śląsk Wrocław	30	13	10	7	42	33	+9	49 (Note: Head-to-head points: Śląsk Wrocław 4, Lech Poznań 1.)	Qualification for the Championship round
4	Lech Poznań	30	13	10	7	55	29	+26	49	Qualification for the Championship round
5	Cracovia	30	14	4	12	39	29	+10	46	Qualification for the Championship round
6	Pogoń Szczecin	30	12	9	9	29	31	−2	45	Qualification for the Championship round
7	Jagiellonia Białystok	30	12	8	10	41	39	+2	44	Qualification for the Championship round
8	Lechia Gdańsk	30	11	10	9	40	42	−2	43	Qualification for the Championship round
9	Górnik Zabrze	30	10	11	9	39	38	+1	41 (Note: Head-to-head away goals: Górnik Zabrze 1, Raków Częstochowa 0.)	Qualification for the Relegation round
10	Raków Częstochowa	30	12	5	13	38	43	−5	41	Qualification for the Relegation round
11	Zagłębie Lubin	30	10	8	12	49	46	+3	38 (Note: Head-to-head points: Zagłębie Lubin 4, Wisła Płock 1.)	Qualification for the Relegation round
12	Wisła Płock	30	10	8	12	37	50	−13	38	Qualification for the Relegation round
13	Wisła Kraków	30	10	5	15	37	47	−10	35	Qualification for the Relegation round
14	Korona Kielce	30	8	6	16	21	37	−16	30	Qualification for the Relegation round
15	Arka Gdynia	30	7	8	15	28	47	−19	29	Qualification for the Relegation round
16	ŁKS Łódź	30	5	6	19	26	53	−27	21	Qualification for the Relegation round

Source: Ekstraklasa, 90minut
Rules for classification: 1) Points; 2) Head-to-head points; 3) Head-to-head goal difference; 4) Head-to-head goals scored; 5) Head-to-head away goals scored (only if two teams); 6) Goal difference; 7) Goals scored; 8) Fairplay ranking; 9) Draw. (Note: Head-to-head record is used only after all the matches between the teams in question have been played.)

=== Positions by round ===
Team ╲ Round	1	2	3	4	5	6	7	8	9	10	11	12	13	14	15	16	17	18	19	20	21	22	23	24	25	26	27	28	29	30
Legia	13	7	7	10	8	8	5	5	3	5	9	7	4	1	1	4	3	2	1	1	1	1	1	1	1	1	1	1	1	1
Piast	5	11	14	9	5	5	7	9	7	9	7	3	2	3	2	5	5	7	5	6	6	7	6	7	6	2	2	2	2	2
Śląsk	3	2	3	1	1	1	1	3	2	4	6	9	6	6	5	2	1	4	3	4	4	4	4	4	3	4	3	4	3	3
Lech	5	3	1	3	4	4	6	8	9	8	5	8	10	9	9	9	8	6	7	5	5	5	5	5	4	5	5	5	4	4
Cracovia	5	11	6	4	7	6	4	2	5	2	2	5	5	2	4	3	4	3	4	2	2	2	2	2	2	3	4	6	5	5
Pogoń	2	1	2	2	2	2	3	1	1	1	1	1	3	5	3	1	2	1	2	3	3	3	3	3	5	6	6	3	6	6
Jagiellonia	1	6	5	7	3	3	2	4	4	6	8	4	8	7	7	7	9	9	8	9	9	9	9	11	9	8	8	8	7	7
Lechia	11	10	4	6	10	10	10	6	6	3	3	6	7	8	8	8	6	5	6	7	7	6	7	6	7	7	7	7	8	8
Górnik	5	4	10	5	9	7	9	10	10	11	11	12	11	12	12	12	12	12	13	12	12	12	12	12	12	12	11	11	10	9
Raków	14	9	12	14	11	11	12	12	13	13	12	11	12	11	11	11	11	11	10	11	11	10	10	9	8	9	9	9	11	10
Zagłębie	5	13	13	8	12	12	13	13	12	10	10	10	9	10	10	10	10	10	11	10	10	11	11	10	11	11	10	10	9	11
Wisła Płock	5	15	15	15	16	13	11	11	8	7	4	2	1	4	6	6	7	8	9	8	8	8	8	8	10	10	12	12	12	12
Wisła Kraków	14	14	11	13	6	9	8	7	11	12	13	13	13	13	16	16	16	16	15	15	15	13	13	13	13	13	13	13	13	13
Korona	3	8	7	11	13	14	16	14	15	15	15	16	16	15	14	13	13	14	14	14	13	14	15	15	15	14	14	14	14	14
Arka	16	16	16	16	15	16	14	15	14	14	14	14	15	16	13	14	15	13	12	13	14	15	14	14	14	15	15	15	15	15
ŁKS	11	4	7	11	14	15	15	16	16	16	16	15	14	14	15	15	14	15	16	16	16	16	16	16	16	16	16	16	16	16

Source: 90minut.pl

=== Results ===
Home \ Away	ARK	CRA	GÓR	JAG	KOR	LPO	LGD	LEG	ŁKS	PIA	POG	RAK	ŚLĄ	WIS	WPŁ	ZAG
Arka Gdynia	—	0–1	1–0	0–3	1–1	0–0	2–2	0–1	1–1	0–0	1–1	3–2	2–1	0–0	1–2	2–1
Cracovia	3–1	—	1–1	0–1	1–0	2–1	1–0	1–2	1–2	2–0	2–0	3–0	2–0	0–2	1–1	2–0
Górnik Zabrze	2–0	3–2	—	3–0	3–0	1–3	2–2	2–0	1–1	1–1	3–1	1–0	0–0	4–2	2–2	1–0
Jagiellonia Białystok	2–0	3–2	3–1	—	0–0	1–1	3–0	0–0	2–0	0–2	2–3	0–1	1–0	3–2	2–2	0–1
Korona Kielce	0–1	1–0	0–0	0–2	—	0–3	1–2	1–2	1–0	1–2	0–1	3–0	1–0	1–1	0–1	1–0
Lech Poznań	1–1	1–2	4–1	1–1	0–0	—	2–0	0–1	2–0	3–0	4–0	3–0	1–3	4–0	4–0	1–2
Lechia Gdańsk	4–3	1–3	1–1	1–1	2–0	2–1	—	0–2	3–1	1–0	0–1	0–3	1–1	0–0	2–0	1–2
Legia Warsaw	5–1	2–1	5–1	4–0	4–0	2–1	1–2	—	3–1	1–2	1–2	3–1	0–0	7–0	3–1	1–0
ŁKS Łódź	1–4	1–0	0–1	0–3	4–1	1–2	0–0	2–3	—	0–1	0–0	2–0	0–1	2–4	0–0	3–2
Piast Gliwice	1–0	1–0	0–0	3–1	1–0	1–1	1–2	2–0	2–1	—	0–0	2–1	0–3	4–0	1–0	2–0
Pogoń Szczecin	2–0	1–0	1–1	1–2	0–1	1–1	1–1	3–1	1–0	1–0	—	1–2	0–0	1–0	1–2	0–3
Raków Częstochowa	2–0	1–3	2–1	2–1	0–1	2–3	2–1	2–2	1–1	2–0	0–0	—	1–0	1–0	1–2	2–1
Śląsk Wrocław	2–1	2–1	2–1	1–1	2–1	1–1	2–2	0–3	4–0	2–1	1–1	1–1	—	2–1	3–1	4–4
Wisła Kraków	0–1	0–1	1–0	3–0	2–0	1–1	0–1	1–3	4–0	1–2	1–0	3–2	0–1	—	2–2	4–2
Wisła Płock	4–1	0–0	1–1	3–1	1–4	0–2	1–2	1–0	2–1	2–1	2–3	0–2	1–2	2–1	—	1–1
Zagłębie Lubin	2–0	1–1	2–0	2–2	1–1	3–3	4–4	2–1	3–1	0–3	0–1	2–2	3–1	0–1	5–0	—

Source: Ekstraklasa, 90minut
Legend: Blue = home team win; Yellow = draw; Red = away team win.
For upcoming matches, an "a" indicates there is an article about the rivalry between the two participants.

== Play-offs ==
=== Championship round ===
==== League table ====
Pos	Team	Pld	W	D	L	GF	GA	GD	Pts	Qualification
1	Legia Warsaw (C)	37	21	6	10	70	35	+35	69	Qualification for the Champions League first qualifying round
2	Lech Poznań	37	18	12	7	70	35	+35	66	Qualification for the Europa League first qualifying round
3	Piast Gliwice	37	18	7	12	41	32	+9	61	Qualification for the Europa League first qualifying round
4	Lechia Gdańsk	37	15	11	11	48	50	−2	56	
5	Śląsk Wrocław	37	14	12	11	51	46	+5	54 (Note: Points in regular season: Śląsk Wrocław - 49 pts, Pogoń Szczecin - 45 pts.)	
6	Pogoń Szczecin	37	14	12	11	37	39	−2	54	
7	Cracovia	37	16	5	16	49	40	+9	53	Qualification for the Europa League first qualifying round (Note: Cracovia qualified for the Europa League first qualifying round by winning the 2019–20 Polish Cup.)
8	Jagiellonia Białystok	37	14	10	13	48	51	−3	52	

Source: Ekstraklasa, 90minut
Rules for classification: 1) Points; 2) Points in regular season; 3) Head-to-head points in regular season; 4) Head-to-head goal difference in regular season; 5) Head-to-head goals scored in regular season; 5) Head-to-head away goals scored in regular season (if only two teams); 7) Goal difference; 8) Goals scored; 9) Fairplay ranking; 10) Play-off (only if needed to decide champion, teams for relegation or teams for UEFA competitions).
(C) Champions

==== Positions by round ====
Team ╲ Round	30	31	32	33	34	35	36	37
Legia	1	1	1	1	1	1	1	1
Lech	4	3	3	3	3	3	2	2
Piast	2	2	2	2	2	2	3	3
Lechia	8	7	5	5	6	6	5	4
Śląsk	3	4	4	4	4	4	4	5
Pogoń	6	8	8	8	8	8	8	6
Cracovia	5	6	7	6	5	5	6	7
Jagiellonia	7	5	6	7	7	7	7	8

Source: 90minut

==== Results ====
Home \ Away	LEG	PIA	ŚLĄ	LPO	CRA	POG	JAG	LGD
Legia Warsaw	—	1–1	2–0	—	2–0	1–2	—	—
Piast Gliwice	—	—	1–0	0–2	1–1	—	2–0	—
Śląsk Wrocław	—	—	—	2–2	3–2	2–2	—	1–2
Lech Poznań	2–1	—	—	—	—	0–0	4–0	3–2
Cracovia	—	—	—	1–2	—	2–1	1–2	—
Pogoń Szczecin	—	1–0	—	—	—	—	2–2	0–1
Jagiellonia Białystok	0–0	—	2–1	—	—	—	—	1–2
Lechia Gdańsk	0–0	1–0	—	—	0–3	—	—	—

Source: Ekstraklasa, 90minut
Legend: Blue = home team win; Yellow = draw; Red = away team win.
For upcoming matches, an "a" indicates there is an article about the rivalry between the two participants.

=== Relegation round ===
==== League table ====
Pos	Team	Pld	W	D	L	GF	GA	GD	Pts	Qualification
9	Górnik Zabrze	37	14	11	12	51	47	+4	53 (Note: Points in regular season: Górnik Zabrze - 41 pts, Raków Częstochowa - 41 pts, Zagłębie Lubin - 38 pts. Head-to-head away goals in regular season: Górnik Zabrze 1, Raków Częstochowa 0.)	
10	Raków Częstochowa	37	16	5	16	51	56	−5	53	
11	Zagłębie Lubin	37	15	8	14	61	53	+8	53	
12	Wisła Płock	37	14	9	14	45	54	−9	51	
13	Wisła Kraków	37	13	6	18	44	56	−12	45	
14	Arka Gdynia (R)	37	10	10	17	39	57	−18	40	Relegation to I liga
15	Korona Kielce (R)	37	9	8	20	29	48	−19	35	Relegation to I liga
16	ŁKS Łódź (R)	37	6	6	25	33	68	−35	24	Relegation to I liga

Source: Ekstraklasa, 90minut
Rules for classification: 1) Points; 2) Points in regular season; 3) Head-to-head points in regular season; 4) Head-to-head goal difference in regular season; 5) Head-to-head goals scored in regular season; 5) Head-to-head away goals scored in regular season (if only two teams); 7) Goal difference; 8) Goals scored; 9) Fairplay ranking; 10) Play-off (only if needed to decide champion, teams for relegation or teams for UEFA competitions).
(R) Relegated

==== Positions by round ====
Team ╲ Round	30	31	32	33	34	35	36	37
Górnik	9	9	9	10	10	9	9	9
Raków	10	10	10	9	9	10	12	10
Zagłębie	11	11	11	11	11	12	11	11
Wisła Płock	12	12	12	12	12	11	10	12
Wisła Kraków	13	13	13	13	13	13	13	13
Arka	15	15	14	14	14	14	14	14
Korona	14	14	15	15	15	15	15	15
ŁKS	16	16	16	16	16	16	16	16

Source: 90minut

==== Results ====
Home \ Away	GÓR	RAK	ZAG	WPŁ	WIS	KOR	ARK	ŁKS
Górnik Zabrze	—	4–1	0–2	—	0–1	3–2	—	—
Raków Częstochowa	—	—	1–2	2–1	3–1	—	3–2	—
Zagłębie Lubin	—	—	—	0–1	3–1	2–1	—	1–0
Wisła Płock	1–0	—	—	—	—	3–1	0–0	2–0
Wisła Kraków	—	—	—	1–0	—	1–1	0–1	—
Korona Kielce	—	0–1	—	—	—	—	1–1	2–0
Arka Gdynia	1–2	—	3–2	—	—	—	—	3–2
ŁKS Łódź	1–3	3–2	—	—	1–2	—	—	—

Source: Ekstraklasa, 90minut
Legend: Blue = home team win; Yellow = draw; Red = away team win.
For upcoming matches, an "a" indicates there is an article about the rivalry between the two participants.

== Season statistics ==
=== Top goalscorers ===
Rank	Player	Club	Goals
1	(Denmark) Christian Gytkjær	Lech Poznań	24
2	(Spain) Igor Angulo	Górnik Zabrze	16
2	(Spain) Jorge Félix	Piast Gliwice	16
4	(Slovenia) Damjan Bohar	Zagłębie Lubin	15
5	(Poland) Jarosław Niezgoda	Legia Warsaw	14
5	(Portugal) Flávio Paixão	Lechia Gdańsk	14
7	(Spain) Jesús Jiménez	Górnik Zabrze	12
7	(Portugal) Rafael Lopes	Cracovia	12
7	(Poland) Piotr Parzyszek	Piast Gliwice	12
10	(Spain) Jesús Imaz	Jagiellonia Białystok	11

=== Top assists ===
Rank	Player	Club	Assists
1	(Poland) Filip Starzyński	Zagłębie Lubin	11
2	(Spain) Dani Ramírez	ŁKS Łódź; Lech Poznań	9
3	(Poland) Alan Czerwiński	Zagłębie Lubin	8
3	(Czech Republic) Petr Schwarz	Raków Częstochowa	8
3	(Poland) Paweł Wszołek	Legia Warsaw	8
6	(Romania) Sergiu Hanca	Cracovia	7
6	(Portugal) Pedro Tiba	Lech Poznań	7
8	(Slovenia) Erik Janža	Górnik Zabrze	6
8	(Spain) Jesús Jiménez	Górnik Zabrze	6
8	(Poland) Michał Karbownik	Legia Warsaw	6
8	(Brazil) Luquinhas	Legia Warsaw	6
8	(Slovakia) Róbert Pich	Śląsk Wrocław	6
8	(Poland) Mateusz Wdowiak	Cracovia	6
8	(Poland) Łukasz Wolsztyński	Górnik Zabrze	6
8	(Slovenia) Saša Živec	Zagłębie Lubin	6

=== Clean sheets ===
Rank	Player	Club	Clean sheets
1	(Slovakia) František Plach	Piast Gliwice	15
2	(Croatia) Dante Stipica	Pogoń Szczecin	14
3	(Netherlands) Mickey van der Hart	Lech Poznań	13
4	(Poland) Radosław Majecki	Legia Warsaw	12
5	(Slovakia) Martin Chudý	Górnik Zabrze	10
5	(Slovakia) Michal Peškovič	Cracovia	10
7	(Poland) Michał Buchalik	Wisła Kraków	9
7	(Poland) Marek Kozioł	Korona Kielce	9
9	(Slovakia) Matúš Putnocký	Śląsk Wrocław	7
9	(Poland) Jakub Szumski	Raków Częstochowa	7
9	(Poland) Damian Węglarz	Jagiellonia Białystok	7

=== Hat-tricks ===
Player	For	Against	Result	Date	Ref
(Spain) Jesús Imaz	Jagiellonia Białystok	Wisła Kraków	3–2 (H)	23 August 2019	
(Poland) Jarosław Niezgoda	Legia Warsaw	Raków Częstochowa	3–1 (H)	1 September 2019	
(Spain) Erik Expósito	Śląsk Wrocław	Zagłębie Lubin	4–4 (H)	21 September 2019	
(Poland) Rafał Kujawa	ŁKS Łódź	Korona Kielce	4–1 (H)	6 October 2019	
(Guinea) José Kanté	Legia Warsaw	Wisła Kraków	7–0 (H)	27 October 2019	
(Portugal) Flávio Paixão	Lechia Gdańsk	Arka Gdynia	4–3 (H)	31 May 2020	
(Denmark) Christian Gytkjær	Lech Poznań	Korona Kielce	3–0 (A)	15 June 2020	

=== Individual statistics ===
- Youngest footballer this season: Kacper Urbański 15 years, 105 days
- Oldest footballer this season: Marcin Wasilewski 40 years, 39 days
- Youngest goal scorer this season: Iwo Kaczmarski 16 years, 93 days
- Oldest goal scorer this season: Ľubomír Guldan 37 years, 156 days

== Attendances ==
=== Before COVID-19 pandemic (after 26th round) ===
Pos	Team	Total	High	Low	Average	Change
1	Legia Warsaw	265,763	25,401	13,285	18,983	+7.8%
2	Wisła Kraków	206,322	33,000	10,076	15,870	−0.6%
3	Lech Poznań	194,234	32,307	7,641	14,941	+25.0%
4	Śląsk Wrocław	174,728	31,819	0	13,440	+48.3%
5	Górnik Zabrze	171,175	18,573	8,201	13,167	−0.3%
6	Lechia Gdańsk	139,138	14,008	7,021	10,702	−27.4%
7	Jagiellonia Białystok	119,984	19,308	4,511	9,229	−2.4%
8	Cracovia	117,901	14,154	6,586	9,069	+30.3%
9	Arka Gdynia	91,479	13,011	3,820	7,036	+0.2%
10	Korona Kielce	68,841	11,692	3,271	5,295	−20.3%
11	ŁKS Łódź	67,158	5,451	4,712	5,166	+13.3%^{1}
12	Wisła Płock	58,786	7,419	1,714	4,522	+4.3%
13	Piast Gliwice	57,127	6,813	3,363	4,394	−11.7%
14	Zagłębie Lubin	53,515	6,063	2,212	4,116	−15.4%
15	Pogoń Szczecin	44,389	3,947	2,895	3,699	−42.8%
16	Raków Częstochowa	38,661	4,153	2,011	2,973	+4.3%^{1}
	League total	1,869,201	33,000	0	8,987	+2.0%

Updated to games played on 9 March 2020.
Source: Ekstraklasa (in Polish)
Notes:
1. Team played last season in I liga.

=== Total attendances ===
Pos	Team	Total	High	Low	Average	Change
1	Legia Warsaw	267,283	25,401	0	14,849	−15.7%
2	Wisła Kraków	219,454	33,000	0	13,716	−14.1%
3	Lech Poznań	222,429	32,307	0	13,084	+9.5%
4	Śląsk Wrocław	197,316	31,819	0	12,332	+36.0%
5	Górnik Zabrze	187,702	18,573	0	11,041	−16.4%
6	Lechia Gdańsk	153,620	14,008	0	9,601	−34.9%
7	Jagiellonia Białystok	129,801	19,308	0	8,113	−14.2%
8	Cracovia	126,804	14,154	0	7,925	+13.9%
9	Arka Gdynia	96,422	13,011	0	6,026	−14.2%
10	Korona Kielce	72,742	11,692	0	4,546	−31.6%
11	ŁKS Łódź	70,082	5,451	0	4,380	−3.9%^{1}
12	Piast Gliwice	63,191	6,813	0	3,717	−25.3%
13	Wisła Płock	61,549	7,419	0	3,621	−16.5%
14	Zagłębie Lubin	57,634	6,063	0	3,390	−30.4%
15	Pogoń Szczecin	47,194	3,947	0	3,146	−51.3%
16	Raków Częstochowa	41,681	4,153	0	2,452	−14.0%^{1}
	League total	2,014,904	33,000	0	6,807	−22.7%

Updated to games played on 19 July 2020.
Source: Ekstraklasa (in Polish)
Notes:
1. Team played last season in I liga.

== Awards ==
=== Monthly awards ===
==== Player of the Month ====
Month	Player	Club
July 2019	(Bosnia and Herzegovina) Zvonimir Kožulj	Pogoń Szczecin
August 2019	(Spain) Jesús Imaz	Jagiellonia Białystok
September 2019	(Poland) Paweł Brożek	Wisła Kraków
October 2019	(Poland) Dominik Furman	Wisła Płock
November 2019	(Poland) Jarosław Niezgoda	Legia Warsaw
December 2019	(Poland) Jarosław Niezgoda	Legia Warsaw
February 2020	(Guinea) José Kanté	Legia Warsaw
June 2020	(Poland) Łukasz Zwoliński	Lechia Gdańsk
July 2020	(Denmark) Christian Gytkjær	Lech Poznań

==== Young Player of the Month ====
Month	Player	Club
July 2019	(Poland) Robert Gumny	Lech Poznań
August 2019	(Poland) Przemysław Płacheta	Śląsk Wrocław
September 2019	(Poland) Bartosz Slisz	Zagłębie Lubin
October 2019	(Poland) Patryk Klimala	Jagiellonia Białystok
November 2019	(Poland) Bartosz Białek	Zagłębie Lubin
December 2019	(Poland) Michał Karbownik	Legia Warsaw
February 2020	(Poland) Kamil Jóźwiak	Lech Poznań
June 2020	(Poland) Jakub Moder	Lech Poznań
July 2020	(Poland) Daniel Szelągowski	Korona Kielce

==== Coach of the Month ====
Month	Coach	Club
July 2019	(Germany) Kosta Runjaić	Pogoń Szczecin
August 2019	(Czech Republic) Vítězslav Lavička	Śląsk Wrocław
September 2019	(Poland) Radosław Sobolewski	Wisła Płock
October 2019	(Poland) Radosław Sobolewski	Wisła Płock
November 2019	(Czech Republic) Vítězslav Lavička	Śląsk Wrocław
December 2019	(Serbia) Aleksandar Rogić	Arka Gdynia
February 2020	(Poland) Artur Skowronek	Wisła Kraków
June 2020	(Poland) Dariusz Żuraw	Lech Poznań
July 2020	(Poland) Dariusz Żuraw	Lech Poznań

=== Annual awards ===
Award	Player	Club
Goalkeeper of the Season	(Slovakia) Dušan Kuciak	Lechia Gdańsk
Defender of the Season	(Poland) Artur Jędrzejczyk	Legia Warsaw
Midfielder of the Season	(Croatia) Domagoj Antolić	Legia Warsaw
Forward of the Season	(Denmark) Christian Gytkjær	Lech Poznań
Coach of the Season	(Serbia) Aleksandar Vuković	Legia Warsaw
Young Player of the Season	(Poland) Michał Karbownik	Legia Warsaw
Player of the Season	(Spain) Jorge Félix	Piast Gliwice
Top Scorer of the Season	(Denmark) Christian Gytkjær	Lech Poznań

Team of the Season
Goalkeeper	(Slovakia) Dušan Kuciak (Lechia Gdańsk)			
Defenders	(Montenegro) Marko Vešović (Legia Warsaw)	(Poland) Jakub Czerwiński (Piast Gliwice)	(Poland) Artur Jędrzejczyk (Legia Warsaw)	(Poland) Michał Karbownik (Legia Warsaw)
Midfielders	(Portugal) Pedro Tiba (Lech Poznań)	(Poland) Jakub Moder (Lech Poznań)		(Poland) Jakub Błaszczykowski (Wisła Kraków)
Forwards	(Poland) Filip Starzyński (Zagłębie Lubin)	(Poland) Kamil Jóźwiak (Lech Poznań)		(Ivory Coast) José Kanté (Legia Warsaw)

== See also ==
- 2019–20 I liga
- 2019–20 II liga
- 2019–20 III liga
- 2019–20 Polish Cup
- 2019 Polish Super Cup
