= Artur Skowronek =

Polish football manager (born 1982)

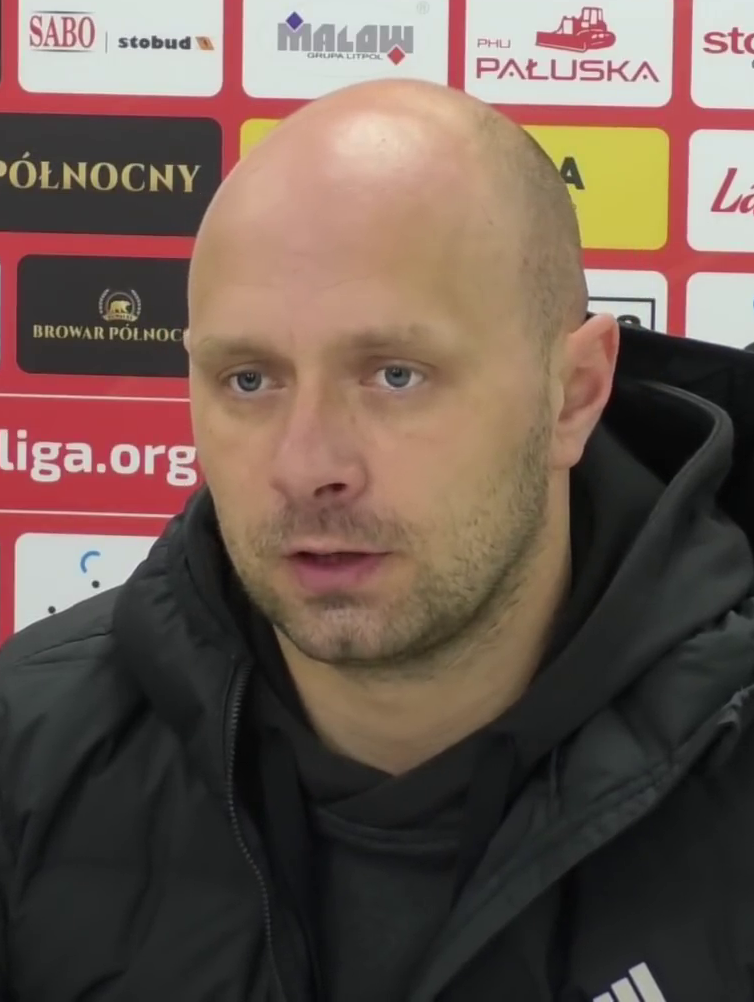

Personal information
- Full name: Artur Skowronek
- Date of birth: 22 May 1982 (age 44)
- Place of birth: Bytom, Poland

Senior career*
Years	Team	Apps	(Gls)
- Ruch Radzionków
- Szombierki Bytom
- GKS Rozbark
- Gwarek Tarnowskie Góry
- Ruch Radzionków II

Managerial career
- 2011–2012: Ruch Radzionków
- 2012–2013: Pogoń Szczecin
- 2013: Polonia Bytom
- 2014: Widzew Łódź
- 2014–2015: GKS Katowice
- 2015: Olimpia Grudziądz
- 2017–2018: Wigry Suwałki
- 2018–2019: Stal Mielec
- 2019–2020: Wisła Kraków
- 2021–2022: Zagłębie Sosnowiec
- 2024–2025: GKS Tychy
- * Club domestic league appearances and goals

Artur Skowronek (born 22 May 1982) is a Polish professional football manager and former player who was most recently in charge of I liga club GKS Tychy. He has managed teams such as Pogoń Szczecin, Widzew Łódź and Wisła Kraków in the Ekstraklasa.

== Managerial statistics ==
As of match played 31 October 2025

Managerial record by team and tenure
Team	From	To	Record							
Team	From	To	G	W	D	L	GF	GA	GD	Win %
Ruch Radzionków	5 January 2011	30 May 2012	53	19	13	21	58	70	−12	35.85
Pogoń Szczecin	11 June 2012	19 March 2013	20	6	4	10	17	25	−8	30.00
Polonia Bytom	10 October 2013	28 November 2013	7	3	2	2	7	5	+2	42.86
Widzew Łódź	6 January 2014	11 June 2014	16	4	6	6	17	19	−2	25.00
GKS Katowice	29 October 2014	25 April 2015	13	4	3	6	11	16	−5	30.77
Olimpia Grudziądz	2 September 2015	17 November 2015	11	1	2	8	5	19	−14	9.09
Wigry Suwałki	8 June 2017	7 June 2018	35	15	7	13	41	39	+2	42.86
Stal Mielec	8 June 2018	22 September 2019	45	24	11	10	72	40	+32	53.33
Wisła Kraków	14 November 2019	28 November 2020	34	12	8	14	47	48	−1	35.29
Zagłębie Sosnowiec	18 September 2021	5 December 2022	47	14	16	17	60	62	−2	29.79
GKS Tychy	28 August 2024	3 November 2025	44	15	12	17	66	69	−3	34.09
Total			325	117	84	124	401	412	−11	36.00

== Honours ==
Individual

- Ekstraklasa Coach of the Month: February 2020
- I liga Coach of the Month: February & March 2025, April 2025
