= Rostyslav Dehtyar =

Ukrainian footballer

Personal information
- Full name: Rostyslav Vladyslavovych Dehtyar
- Date of birth: 30 March 1999 (age 27)
- Place of birth: Donetsk, Ukraine
- Height: 1.92 m (6 ft 4 in)
- Position: Goalkeeper

Team information
- Current team: DV Solingen
- Number: 1

Youth career
- –2018: Stal Kamianske

Senior career*
Years	Team	Apps	(Gls)
2018–2021	Zemplín Michalovce	3	(0)
2019	→ Slavoj Trebišov (loan)	0	(0)
2021–2022	Munkach Mukachevo	8	(0)
2022	Uzhhorod	0	(0)
2023	Tomasovia Tomaszów Lubelski	7	(0)
2023–2024	Podlasie Biała Podlaska	6	(0)
2024–	DV Solingen	12	(0)
- * Club domestic league appearances and goals as of 23:27, 3 June 2026 (UTC)

Rostyslav Vladyslavovych Dehtyar (Ukrainian: Ростислав Владиславович Дегтяр, also transliterated Dehtiar, born 30 March 1999) is a Ukrainian professional footballer who plays as a goalkeeper for German club DV Solingen.

== Club career ==
=== MFK Zemplín Michalovce ===
Dehtyar made his Fortuna Liga debut for Zemplín Michalovce against Spartak Trnava on 27 June 2020.
