= Podlasie Biała Podlaska =

Association football club in Poland

MKS Podlasie Biała Podlaska
- Full name: Miejski Klub Sportowy Podlasie Biała Podlaska
- Founded: 15 March 1957; 69 years ago
- Stadium: Stadion Miejski
- Capacity: 1,221
- Chairman: Sebastian Paszkowski
- Manager: Maciej Oleksiuk
- League: III liga, group IV
- 2025–26: III liga, group IV, 7th of 18
- Website: mkspodlasie1957.pl

Miejski Klub Sportowy Podlasie Biała Podlaska is a Polish football team based in Biała Podlaska. The club currently competes in group IV of the fourth-tier III liga.

== History ==
In 1957, the club was formed playing at the district level in Lublin as Podlasie. In March 1974, the Podlasie club ended its sports existence, as it merged with two other sports clubs in the city (Krzna and AZS) to form Robotniczo-Akademicki Klub Sportowy (RAKS) Biała Podlaska. In 1984, the Podlasie club reformed. In 1996, the football section of another club AZS AWF was transferred to Podlasie, with the club now entering into the league under the name Klub Sportowy AZS-Podlasie Biała Podlaska. Since 2003, the club has played under the name Miejski Klub Sportowy Podlasie Biała Podlaska.

== Players ==
=== Current squad ===
As of 25 November 2023

Note: Flags indicate national team as defined under FIFA eligibility rules; some limited exceptions apply. Players may hold more than one non-FIFA nationality.

| No. | Pos. | Nation | Player |
|---|---|---|---|
| 1 | GK | POL | Michał Nos |
| 3 | MF | POL | Marcin Pigiel |
| 4 | DF | POL | Jan Kozłowski |
| 5 | DF | POL | Krzysztof Salak |
| 6 | MF | POL | Maciej Orzechowski |
| 7 | MF | POL | Mateusz Wyjadłowski |
| 8 | DF | POL | Arkadiusz Kot |
| 9 | FW | POL | Jakub Kobyliński |
| 10 | MF | POL | Kacper Jakóbczyk |
| 11 | MF | POL | Miłosz Pacek |
| 12 | GK | POL | Rafał Misztal |
| 13 | MF | POL | Szymon Kamiłski |
| 14 | DF | POL | Patryk Kapusciński |
| 15 | DF | UKR | Dmytro Avdyeyev |

| No. | Pos. | Nation | Player |
|---|---|---|---|
| 16 | MF | POL | Adrian Wnuk |
| 17 | MF | POL | Jarosław Kosieradzki |
| 18 | MF | POL | Karol Domański |
| 19 | FW | POL | Maciej Kurowski |
| 20 | MF | POL | Karol Misiejuk |
| 21 | MF | POL | Mateusz Majbański |
| 23 | DF | POL | Mateusz Podstolak |
| 30 | FW | POL | Damian Lepiarz |
| 32 | MF | POL | Dawid Nojszewski |
| 77 | MF | POL | Tomasz Andrzejuk |
| 96 | GK | UKR | Rostyslav Dehtyar |
| 99 | MF | POL | Dominik Sikora |
| — | DF | POL | Przemysław Chazan |
