= III liga, group IV =

- Founded: 2016; 10 years ago
- Country: Poland
- Confederation: UEFA
- Number of clubs: 18
- Level on pyramid: 4
- Promotion to: II liga
- Relegation to: IV liga
- Domestic cup: Polish Cup
- Current champions: Avia Świdnik (2025–26)
- Sponsor(s): Betclic
- Current: 2026–27 III liga

III liga, group IV, currently named Betclic III liga, grupa IV due to league-wide sponsorship by Betclic, is one of the four groups of the III liga, which are competitions of the fourth tier of the Polish football league system.

This group was established in 2016, when, after the 2015–16 season, as a result of the reorganization of the III liga in Poland, group VII was merged with group VIII.

Responsible for the games taking place in this group are: the Lublin Football Association based in Lublin, the Lesser Poland Football Association based in Kraków, the Subcarpathian Football Association based in Rzeszów and the Holy Cross Football Association based in Kielce. The group consists of 18 teams from the following voivodeships: Lublin, Lesser Poland, Subcarpathian and Holy Cross.

In the 2020–21 season, due to the COVID-19 pandemic unexpected complications (no relegation to IV liga and one relegated team from II liga after the 2019–20 season), the group was temporarily expanded to 21 teams.

== Top finishers ==
Season	Champion	Runner-up	Third place
2016–17	Garbarnia Kraków	Motor Lublin	Stal Rzeszów
2017–18	Resovia	Motor Lublin	KSZO Ostrowiec Świętokrzyski
2018–19	Stal Rzeszów	Podhale Nowy Targ	Motor Lublin
2019–20	Motor Lublin / Hutnik Kraków (Note: Due to the fact that the competition was not completed, promotion to the II liga was granted to Motor Lublin, who, equal on points with Hutnik Kraków, held a more favorable goal difference. Then, by the decision of the PZPN Emergency Committee, the number of promoted teams from the group was increased to two to include Hutnik.)		Wólczanka Wólka Pełkińska
2020–21	Wisła Puławy	Chełmianka Chełm	Sokół Sieniawa
2021–22	Siarka Tarnobrzeg	Chełmianka Chełm	ŁKS Łagów
2022–23	Stal Stalowa Wola	Avia Świdnik	Wieczysta Kraków
2023–24	Wieczysta Kraków	Siarka Tarnobrzeg	Star Starachowice
2024–25	Sandecja Nowy Sącz	Podhale Nowy Targ	Siarka Tarnobrzeg
2025–26	Avia Świdnik	KSZO 1929 Ostrowiec Świętokrzyski	Chełmianka Chełm

== Top scorers ==
Season	Top scorer(s)	Club(s)	Goals
2016–17	Wojciech Reiman	Stal Rzeszów	17
2017–18	Przemysław Banaszak	Chełmianka Chełm	20
2018–19	Tomasz Płonka	Stal Rzeszów	20
2019–20	Rafał Król	Stal Kraśnik (14), Motor Lublin (2)	16
2019–20	Krzysztof Ropski	Siarka Tarnobrzeg	16
2020–21	Adrian Paluchowski	Wisła Puławy	28
2021–22	Wojciech Białek	Avia Świdnik	25
2022–23	Hubert Antkowiak	Podhale Nowy Targ	19
2023–24	Bartłomiej Korbecki	Chełmianka Chełm	20
2024–25	Rafał Wolsztyński	Sandecja Nowy Sącz	25
2025–26	Paweł Mróz	Siarka Tarnobrzeg	21
