= Hetman Zamość =

Polish football club

- Full name: K.S. Hetman Zamość
- Nickname: Hetman Wielki Koronny
- Founded: 14 April 1934; 92 years ago
- Ground: Stadion OSiR w Zamościu
- Capacity: 12,500
- Chairman: Leszek Bartnicki
- Manager: Łukasz Gieresz
- League: III liga, group IV
- 2025–26: IV liga Lublin, 1st of 16 (promoted)
- Website: kshetman.zamosc.pl
Home colours	Away colours

Hetman Zamość is a football club based in Zamość, Poland. The club plays in group IV of the III liga, the fourth tier of football in the country, after winning the 2025–26 IV liga Lublin.

The club was formed under the name Strzelec before later becoming Hetman Zamość. Over the years the club has also been known as Sparta Zamość, Unia Zamość, MZKS Hetman Zamość and Hetman – Kadex Zamość. The club play their home games at the Stadion OSiR w Zamościu.

The club has spent numerous years moving between the national and regional divisions, peaking in a period between 1992 and 2003 where they spent time in the second tier of Polish football. In March 2010, the club withdrew from II liga due to financial reasons in the middle of the competitive season. They reformed on the basis of a local youth team founded in 1993 and are once again playing local regional football. The club reached the quarter finals of the Polish Cup in 1994 and 1997, with their best performance in the Polish League Cup being the fifth round which was achieved in consecutive seasons in 2000–01 and 2001–02 seasons.

== History ==
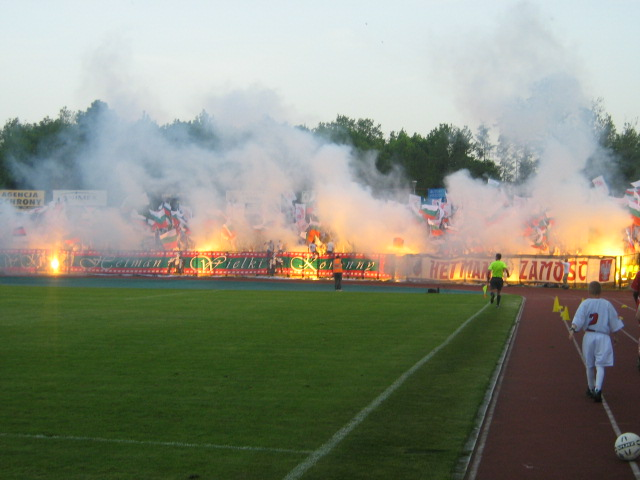
Hetman Ultras during the 2007–08 season

Hetman started football in 1934 in competing in the Klasa C League, They finished 1st and were promoted to Klasa B. Two years later, the club won further promotion to Klasa A, playing there from 1936 to 1954. From 1956 to 1970 the club were realigned to play in local football, in 1970 they played another season in III liga and in 1972 they were promoted to II liga.

From 1973 to 1975 the club were once again moved into regional football where they spent much of the next decade playing in the Zamość-Chełm District divisions. In 1987 they were once again promoted through into national football by reaching III liga once again.

The period between 1992 and 2003 was known as the "golden period" of the club, with Hetman playing as high up as II liga once again. In the 2009–10 season, on March 16, 2010, the club decided to withdraw from the competition just before the spring round for financial and personnel reasons. The club reached the quarter-finals of the Polish Cup in 1994 and 1997, with the fifth round in the Polish League Cup being reached during the 2000–01 and 2001–02 seasons.

The club were reformed off the back of a local youth team and re-entered local football in the Lublin-Zamość district.

== Stadium ==
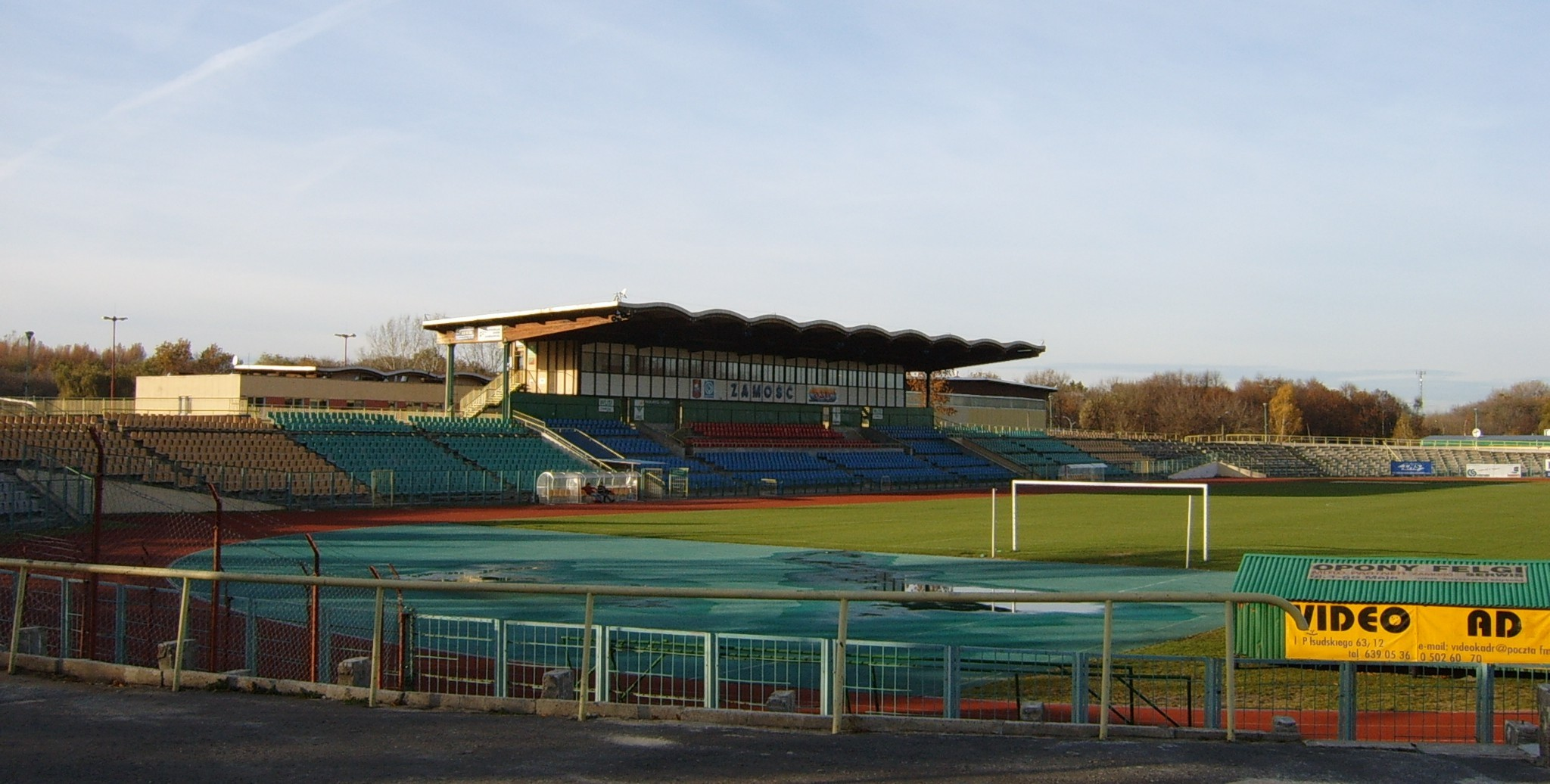
Stadion OSiR w Zamościu

Hetman's first team plays league matches at the sports and recreation center stadium in Zamość. The stadium is located at City Park and is named the OSiR Stadium, 300 m from the Old Town and 400 m from the railway station. The reserve team played their league matches on the pitch behind Rotunda, which is part of the club's training base.

The construction of a sports centre in Zamość along with a swimming pool and stadium was established in 1933. A year later, in 1934, the swimming pool was opened. In 1935, the construction of the stadium was completed. In the post-World War 2 period, the area was significantly expanded. The field and running track of the former stadium were reconstructed, a football training field and a complex of small games fields were built. Between 1967 and 1971 the stadium was refurbished for the sum of PLN 8 million which incorporated a modern sports hall designed by Wojciech Zabłocki. Between 2007 and 2012 the stadium went through another period of redevelopment The plans included reconstruction of the non-renovated part of the stands, renovation of the changing rooms, sound system, Press Boxes and VIP seating, and the installation of a new floodlight system. The investments were co-financed by the European Union.

== League appearances ==
- 1934 – 1st in Klasa C
- 1935 – 1st in Klasa B
- 1936–39, 1946–54 – Klasa A
- 1955 – III liga
- 1956–1970 – Regional league
- 1970–1972 – Regional league
- 1972–73 – Klasa Okręgowa
- 1973–1975 – Provincial league
- 1975–76 – Liga M-W
- 1976–77 – Regional league Zamość-Chełm
- 1977–79 – III liga
- 1979–80 – Interregional league
- 1980–81 – Regional league Zamość-Chełm
- 1981–82 – Provincial league
- 1982–1992 – III liga
- 1992–2003 – II liga
- 2003–2008 – III liga
- 2008–2010 – II liga
- 2016–2019 – IV liga
- 2019–2021 – III liga
- 2021–2022 – IV liga
- 2022–2024 – Regional league
- 2024–2026 – IV liga
- 2026–current – III liga

== Seasons ==
Hetman's performance during professional seasons.

=== II liga ===
- 1992–93 – 11.
- 1993–94 – 9.
- 1994–95 – 8.
- 1995–96 – 14.
- 1996–97 – 14.
- 1997–98 – 13.
- 1998–99 – 7.
- 1999–2000 – 15.
- 2000–01 – 13.
- 2001–02 – 7.
- 2002–03 – 17.
- 2008–09 – 13.
- 2009–10 – 18.

=== III liga ===
- 1970–71 – 9.
- 1971–72 – 16.
- 1977–78 – 11.
- 1978–79 – 11.
- 1982–83 – 6.
- 1983–84 – 8.
- 1984–85 – 5.
- 1985–86 – 11.
- 1986–87 – 7.
- 1987–88 – 10.
- 1988–89 – 7.
- 1989–90 – 6.
- 1990–91 – 6.
- 1991–92 – 1.
- 2003–04 – 7.
- 2004–05 – 8.
- 2005–06 – 11.
- 2006–07 – 11.
- 2007–08 – 2.

=== Polish Cup ===
- 1993–94 – quarter-finals
- 1996–97 – quarter-finals

=== Polish League Cup ===
- 2000–01 – fifth round
- 2001–02 – fifth round
