= Damian Nowak =

Polish footballer

Personal information
- Full name: Damian Nowak
- Date of birth: 14 May 1992 (age 34)
- Place of birth: Pszczyna, Poland
- Height: 1.85 m (6 ft 1 in)
- Position: Forward

Team information
- Current team: Rotuz Bronów

Youth career
- UMKS Czechowice-Dziedzice
- 2007–2011: Podbeskidzie

Senior career*
| Years | Team | Apps | (Gls) |
| 2011–2014 | Podbeskidzie | 2 | (0) |
| 2013 | → BKS Stal (loan) | 12 | (1) |
| 2013–2014 | Podbeskidzie II | 13 | (3) |
| 2014 | → Pelikan Łowicz (loan) | 13 | (1) |
| 2014 | Pelikan Łowicz | 13 | (3) |
| 2015 | LKS Czaniec | 22 | (2) |
| 2016–2019 | Skra Częstochowa | 87 | (25) |
| 2019–2020 | Radomiak Radom | 23 | (6) |
| 2020–2022 | GKS Tychy | 28 | (3) |
| 2022 | Sandecja Nowy Sącz | 2 | (0) |
| 2022–2024 | Pogoń Siedlce | 52 | (24) |
| 2024 | Olimpia Grudziądz | 8 | (2) |
| 2025 | Znicz Kłobuck | 33 | (14) |
| 2026– | Rotuz Bronów | 0 | (0) |
- * Club domestic league appearances and goals as of 12:39, 7 March 2026 (UTC)

Damian Nowak (born 14 May 1992) is a Polish professional footballer who plays as a forward for regional league club Rotuz Bronów.

== Club career ==
On 7 August 2020, Nowak signed a two-year contract with GKS Tychy.

On 1 March 2022, it was announced Nowak signed a contract until the end of the season, with a one-year extension option, with another I liga side, Sandecja Nowy Sącz.

On 7 June 2022, Nowak joined Pogoń Siedlce on a one-year deal.

On 14 June 2024, it was announced he would join II liga club Olimpia Grudziądz as a free agent upon the expiration of his contract with Pogoń. He left Olimpia by mutual consent on 18 December 2024.

In February 2025, Nowak joined V liga Silesia club Znicz Kłobuck.

== Honours ==
Skra Częstochowa

- III liga, group III: 2017–18
- Polish Cup (Częstochowa regionals): 2017–18

Pogoń Siedlce

- II liga: 2023–24
