= IV liga Lublin =

- Organising body: Lublin Football Association
- Founded: 2000; 26 years ago
- Country: Poland
- Number of clubs: 16
- Level on pyramid: 5
- Promotion to: III liga, group IV
- Relegation to: Liga okręgowa
- Current champions: Hetman Zamość (3rd title) (2025–26)
- Most championships: Lewart Lubartów (4 titles)

IV liga Lublin group (grupa lubelska), also known as Macron IV liga lubelska for sponsorship reasons, is one of the groups of IV liga, the fifth level of Polish football league system.

The league was created in the 2000–01 season, after a new administrative division of Poland was implemented. Until the end of the 2007–08 season, IV liga was the fourth tier of league system, but this was changed with the formation of the Ekstraklasa as the top-level league in Poland.

The clubs from Lublin Voivodeship compete in this group. The winner of the league is promoted to III liga, group IV. The bottom teams are relegated to the groups of Liga okręgowa from Lublin Voivodeship. These groups are Biała Podlaska, Chełm, Lublin and Zamość.

== See also ==
- Lublin District League
