= Stal Kraśnik =

Association football club in Poland

- Full name: Fabryczny Klub Sportowy Stal Kraśnik
- Founded: 16 September 1948; 77 years ago (as Klub Sportowy Metal)
- Ground: MOSiR Stadium
- Capacity: 2,000
- Chairman: Karol Grządka
- Manager: Szymon Szydełko
- League: IV liga Lublin
- 2025–26: III liga, group IV, 15th of 18 (relegated)
- Website: www.stalkrasnik.com
Home colours	Away colours

Stal Kraśnik is a Polish football club based in Kraśnik. Founded in 1948, the club is currently competing in the IV liga Lublin, the fifth tier of the Polish football league, following relegation from the III liga in the 2025–26 season.

== History ==
Stal Kraśnik was formed in 1948 as Klub Sportowy Metal. On 16 September 1951, the club changed its name to Stal. In the 1956 season, Stal gained promotion to the third tier of the Polish football league for the first time in its history. In the 1960–61 campaign, Stal won the regional championship, and qualified to the promotion playoffs, but lost in the final round. In 1962, Stal Kraśnik reached the round of 16 of the Polish Cup, after defeating I liga team Odra Opole 1–0, in front of 8,000 fans.

In the 1966–67 season, Stal reached their highest ever league position of second in the reformed third tier, at one point behind the winners Włókniarz Pabianice. They have spent sixteen seasons in the third division, most recently in the 2001–02 season.

== Stadium ==
The club play their home matches at Stadion MOSiR in Kraśnik (Kraśnik MOSiR Stadium), which has a capacity of 2,000. The record attendance for a football match in Kraśnik was on 30 April 1967 when a crowd of 15,000 attended Stal's 0–2 loss to Motor Lublin.
