= IV liga =

- Founded: 7 January 2007 (new formula)
- Country: Poland
- Confederation: UEFA
- Number of clubs: 281 (in 2025–26)
- Level on pyramid: 5
- Promotion to: III liga
- Relegation to: Liga okręgowa or V liga
- Domestic cup: Polish Cup
- Current: 2026–27 IV liga

IV liga (Czwarta liga) is the fifth level of the Polish football league system. The current structure of IV liga was created in the 2000–01 season after introducing the new administrative division of Poland. Groups consists most often of 18 clubs, which each group winner earning promotion to III liga. The bottom clubs are relegated to Liga okręgowa or V liga (depending on the voivodeship).

Until the end of the 2007–08 season, IV liga was the fourth tier of league system, but this was changed with the formation of the Ekstraklasa as the highest level of football league in Poland.

== Groups ==
In the 2025–26 season, there are 16 parallel groups of IV liga:

- dolnośląska (Lower Silesia)
- kujawsko-pomorska (Cuyavia-Pomerania)
- lubelska (Lublin)
- lubuska (Lubusz)
- łódzka (Łódź)
- małopolska (Lesser Poland)
- mazowiecka (Mazovia)
- opolska (Opole)
- podkarpacka (Subcarpathia)
- podlaska (Podlasie)
- pomorska (Pomerania)
- śląska (Silesia)
- świętokrzyska (Holy Cross)
- warmińsko-mazurska (Warmia-Masuria)
- wielkopolska (Greater Poland)
- zachodniopomorska (West Pomerania)
