= 2011–12 Polish Cup =

Puchar Polski

Tournament details
- Country: Poland
- Dates: 19 July 2011 – 24 April 2012
- Teams: 79

Final positions
- Champions: Legia Warsaw (15th title)
- Runners-up: Ruch Chorzów

Tournament statistics
- Matches played: 84
- Goals scored: 256 (3.05 per match)
- Top goal scorer(s): Tsvetan Genkov; Michał Żyro (4 goals each)

The 2011–12 Polish Cup was the 58th season of the annual Polish football knockout tournament. It began on 19 July 2011 with the first matches of the extra preliminary round and ended on 24 April 2012 with the final. The winners qualified for the second qualifying round of the 2012–13 UEFA Europa League.

Legia Warsaw were the defending champions, having won their record breaking 14th title in the previous season. They successfully defended this title, becoming the winner of the Polish Cup for the 15th time in history.

== Extra preliminary round ==
The draw for this round was conducted at the headquarters of the Polish FA on 28 June 2011. Participating in this round were 16 regional cup winners and 36 teams from the 2010–11 II Liga. The matches were played between 19 and 21 July 2011.

Team 1	Score	Team 2
19 July 2011
Stal Rzeszów	0–1 (a.e.t.)	Okocimski KS Brzesko
21 July 2011
Gryf Orlex Wejherowo	1–0	Olimpia Grudziądz
Bałtyk Koszalin	0–2	Zawisza Bydgoszcz
Huragan Morąg	3–3 (a.e.t.) (5–3 p)	Bałtyk Gdynia
ŁKS 1926 Łomża	2–3	OKS 1945 Olsztyn
Lech Rypin	1–0	Jeziorak Iława
Sokół Kleczew	9–3	Polonia Słubice
Steinpol-Ilanka Rzepin	w/o^{1}	Jarota Jarocin
Włókniarz Zelów	2–3	Świt Nowy Dwór Mazowiecki
Mazur Karczew	0–2 (a.e.t.)	Wigry Suwałki
Podlasie Biała Podlaska II	2–3	Sokół Sokółka
Alit Ożarów	1–7	Wisła Płock
Chrobry Głogów	w/o^{2}	Czarni Żagań
Start Namysłów	0–3	Miedź Legnica
Rozwój Katowice II	5–2 (a.e.t.)	Górnik Wałbrzych
Limanovia Limanowa	2–0	Raków Częstochowa
LZS Turbia	1–0 (a.e.t.)	Motor Lublin
Chojniczanka Chojnice	2–3	Ruch Zdzieszowice
Ruch Wysokie Mazowieckie	w/o^{3}	Olimpia Elbląg
Pelikan Łowicz	2–0	Zagłębie Sosnowiec
Polonia Nowy Tomyśl	w/o^{4}	GKS Tychy
Tur Turek	1–2	Elana Toruń
Resovia	w/o^{5}	GLKS Nadarzyn
Lechia Zielona Góra	0–1	Nielba Wągrowiec
Start Otwock	2–3	Znicz Pruszków
Puszcza Niepołomice	1–1 (a.e.t.) (5–3 p)	Stal Stalowa Wola

Notes:

1. Steinpol-Ilanka Rzepin withdrew from the competition.
2. Czarni Żagań used ineligible players. The match ended in a 2–1 victory for Chrobry.
3. Ruch Wysokie Mazowieckie withdrew from the competition.
4. Polonia Nowy Tomyśl withdrew from the competition.
5. GLKS Nadarzyn withdrew from the competition.

== Preliminary round ==
The matches were played on 2 and 3 August 2011 with the exception of Gryf vs. Zawisza match which was postponed to 10 August. Ruch Zdzieszowice and Jarota Jarocin received a bye to the first round.

Team 1	Score	Team 2
2 August 2011
GKS Tychy	1–3	Elana Toruń
Sokół Kleczew	3–2	Lech Rypin
Znicz Pruszków	0–1	Puszcza Niepołomice
3 August 2011
Huragan Morąg	0–1	OKS 1945 Olsztyn
Świt Nowy Dwór Mazowiecki	0–2	Olimpia Elbląg
Sokół Sokółka	1–0	Wigry Suwałki
Resovia	5–3	Wisła Płock
Chrobry Głogów	3–2 (a.e.t.)	Miedź Legnica
LZS Turbia	0–4	Limanovia Limanowa
Okocimski KS Brzesko	1–0	Pelikan Łowicz
Rozwój Katowice II	1–0	Nielba Wągrowiec
10 August 2011
Gryf Orlex Wejherowo	3–3 (a.e.t.) (4–3 p)	Zawisza Bydgoszcz

== Round 1 ==
The draw for this round was conducted at the headquarters of the Polish FA on 4 August 2011. The 14 winners of the preliminary round, along with Jarota Jarocin and Ruch Zdzieszowice and the eighteen teams from 2010–11 I Liga will compete in this round.

Team 1	Score	Team 2
16 August 2011
Elana Toruń	1–3 (a.e.t.)	Flota Świnoujście
Okocimski KS Brzesko	2–2 (a.e.t.) (4–2 p)	KS Polkowice
Puszcza Niepołomice	0–0 (a.e.t.) (4–2 p)	GKS Katowice
Ruch Zdzieszowice	2–0	Kolejarz Stróże
17 August 2011
Rozwój Katowice II	w/o^{1}	KSZO Ostrowiec Świętokrzyski
Sokół Kleczew	0–2	MKS Kluczbork
Olimpia Elbląg	1–1 (a.e.t.) (4–3 p)	Warta Poznań
Sokół Sokółka	2–3 (a.e.t.)	Ruch Radzionków
OKS 1945 Olsztyn	1–0 (a.e.t.)	Pogoń Szczecin
Gryf Orlex Wejherowo	1–0	Sandecja Nowy Sącz
Jarota Jarocin	0–1 (a.e.t.)	Dolcan Ząbki
Termalica Bruk-Bet Nieciecza	0–2	ŁKS Łódź
Piast Gliwice	5–2 (a.e.t.)	Bogdanka Łęczna
23 August 2011
Resovia	1–3	Podbeskidzie Bielsko-Biała
No match
Chrobry Głogów	w/o^{2}	Odra Wodzisław Śląski
Limanovia Limanowa	w/o^{2}	GKP Gorzów Wielkopolski

Notes:

1. KSZO Ostrowiec Świętokrzyski withdrew from the competition.
2. Odra Wodzisław Śląski and GKP Gorzów Wielkopolski went into liquidation before the start of the season.

== Round 2 ==
The draw for this round was made on 24 August 2011. The sixteen winners of the Round 1 and the sixteen teams from 2010–11 Ekstraklasa will compete in this round. The matches will be played between 20 and 28 September 2011.

Team 1	Score	Team 2
20 September 2011
Chrobry Głogów	0–3	Lech Poznań
Dolcan Ząbki	0–1	Górnik Zabrze
Limanovia Limanowa	1–0	Lechia Gdańsk
21 September 2011
Olimpia Elbląg	0–0 (a.e.t.) (1–3 p)	Arka Gdynia
Rozwój Katowice	1–4	Legia Warsaw
Ruch Zdzieszowice	3–1	Jagiellonia Białystok
MKS Kluczbork	3–2	Zagłębie Lubin
Ruch Radzionków	0–4	Polonia Warsaw
Piast Gliwice	0–1	Cracovia
Gryf Orlex Wejherowo	1–0	Korona Kielce
ŁKS Łódź	0–1 (a.e.t.)	Ruch Chorzów
22 September 2011
Flota Świnoujście	2–4	Wisła Kraków
27 September 2011
Okocimski KS Brzesko	1–3	Śląsk Wrocław
Podbeskidzie Bielsko-Biała	3–0	GKS Bełchatów
28 September 2011
Puszcza Niepołomice	1–1 (4–5 p)	Polonia Bytom
OKS 1945 Olsztyn	0–1	Widzew Łódź

20 September 2011	Chrobry Głogów	0–3	Lech Poznań	Głogów
15:30 CEST (UTC+02:00)			Ubiparip 23'; Štilić 72' (pen.); Rudņevs 90+1'	Stadium: Stadion GOS; Attendance: 2,900; Referee: Tomasz Wajda (Żywiec)

20 September 2011	Dolcan Ząbki	0–1	Górnik Zabrze	Ząbki
16:00 CEST (UTC+02:00)			Gołębiewski 52'	Stadium: Stadion Dolcanu; Attendance: 700; Referee: Bartosz Frankowski (Toruń)

20 September 2011	Limanovia Limanowa	1–0	Lechia Gdańsk	Limanowa
16:00 CEST (UTC+02:00)	Kępa 19'			Stadium: Roman Szumilas Stadium; Attendance: 1,800; Referee: Marcin Szrek (Kielce)

21 September 2011	Olimpia Elbląg	0–0 (1–3 p)	Arka Gdynia	Elbląg
15:30 CEST (UTC+02:00)				Stadium: Stadion Miejski; Attendance: 1,900; Referee: Adam Lyczmański (Bydgoszcz)
	Penalties
	Pacan (penalty missed); Sierant (penalty scored); Szary (penalty missed); Lyubenov (penalty missed)		Kuklis (penalty scored); Arifović (penalty missed); Flis (penalty scored); Niedziela (penalty scored)

21 September 2011	Rozwój Katowice	1–4	Legia Warsaw	Katowice
15:30 CEST (UTC+02:00)	Gałecki 41'		Ohayon 16'; Rybus 42'; Komorowski 65' (pen.); Wolski 76'	Stadium: Stadion Rozwoju; Attendance: 900; Referee: Mariusz Podgórski (Wrocław)

21 September 2011	Ruch Zdzieszowice	3–1	Jagiellonia Białystok	Zdzieszowice
16:00 CEST (UTC+02:00)	Bukowiec 52', 79'; Damrat 54'		Kupisz 65'	Stadium: Stadion Miejski; Attendance: 1,100; Referee: Piotr Wasielewski (Kalisz)

21 September 2011	MKS Kluczbork	3–2	Zagłębie Lubin	Kluczbork
16:00 CEST (UTC+02:00)	Glanowski 9'; Tuszyński 28'; Ekwueme 50'		Woźniak 16'; Šernas 87'	Stadium: Stadion Miejski; Attendance: 1,200; Referee: Jacek Małyszek (Lublin)

21 September 2011	Ruch Radzionków	0–4	Polonia Warsaw	Bytom
16:00 CEST (UTC+02:00)			Çani 9', 84'; Wszołek 70'; Bonin 90'	Stadium: Stadion Ruchu Radzionków; Attendance: 900; Referee: Paweł Pskit (Łódź)

21 September 2011	Piast Gliwice	0–1	Cracovia	Gliwice
16:00 CEST (UTC+02:00)			Puzigaća 21'	Stadium: Stadion Carbo; Attendance: 1,500; Referee: Tomasz Garbowski (Kluczbork)

21 September 2011	Gryf Orlex Wejherowo	1–0	Korona Kielce	Wejherowo
16:00 CEST (UTC+02:00)	Wicki 25'			Stadium: Stadion WKS; Attendance: 1,000; Referee: Łukasz Bednarek (Koszalin)

21 September 2011	ŁKS Łódź	0–1 (a.e.t.)	Ruch Chorzów	Chorzów
18:45 CEST (UTC+02:00)			Abbott 105'	Stadium: Stadion Ruchu^{1} Attendance: 5,900; Referee: Tomasz Musiał (Kraków)

22 September 2011	Flota Świnoujście	2–4	Wisła Kraków	Świnoujście
15:30 CEST (UTC+02:00)	Opałacz 19'; Misan 43'		Biton 9', 48'; Iliev 74'; Małecki 90+3'	Stadium: Stadion OSiR Wyspiarz; Attendance: 1,400; Referee: Daniel Stefański (Bydgoszcz)

27 September 2011	Okocimski KS Brzesko	1–3	Śląsk Wrocław	Brzesko
15:30 CEST (UTC+02:00)	Oświęcimka 58'		Pawłowicz 1' (o.g.); Voskamp 12'; Elsner 82'	Stadium: Stadion Okocimskiego KS; Attendance: 1,800; Referee: Mirosław Górecki (Ruda Śląska)

27 September 2011	Podbeskidzie Bielsko-Biała	3–0	GKS Bełchatów	Bielsko Biała
19:00 CEST (UTC+02:00)	Malinowski 3'; Demjan 42'; Sacha 44'			Stadium: City Stadium; Attendance: 2,700; Referee: Paweł Raczkowski (Warsaw)

28 September 2011	Puszcza Niepołomice	1–1 (4–5 p)	Polonia Bytom	Niepołomice
15:30 CEST (UTC+02:00)	Paul 31'		Paulista 17'	Stadium: Stadion Miejski; Attendance: 700; Referee: Krzysztof Jakubik (Siedlce)
	Penalties
	Księżyc (penalty scored); Janik (penalty scored); Zontek (penalty missed); Cholewiak (penalty scored); Nowak (penalty scored)		Świerczok (penalty scored); Dziewulski (penalty scored); Killar (penalty scored); Tiodorović (penalty scored); Tomczyk (penalty scored)

28 September 2011	OKS 1945 Olsztyn	0–1	Widzew Łódź	Olsztyn
16:00 CEST (UTC+02:00)			Grzelczak 61'	Stadium: Stadion OSiR; Attendance: 3,500; Referee: Sebastian Jarzębak (Bytom)

Notes:

1. Due to renovation of the ŁKS stadium, the match took place in Chorzów, while ŁKS remained the host officially.

== Round 3 ==
The 16 winners from Round 2 compete in this round. The matches took place on October 18, 19, 25, 26 and November 9, 2011.

Team 1	Score	Team 2
18 October 2011
Gryf Orlex Wejherowo	1–0	Górnik Zabrze
Podbeskidzie Bielsko-Biała	0–1	Śląsk Wrocław
19 October 2011
Ruch Zdzieszowice	1–0	MKS Kluczbork
Arka Gdynia	3–1	Polonia Warsaw
25 October 2011
Polonia Bytom	1–3 (a.e.t.)	Lech Poznań
26 October 2011
Limanovia Limanowa	1–2	Wisła Kraków
Legia Warsaw	3–0	Widzew Łódź
9 November 2011
Ruch Chorzów	2–1 (a.e.t.)	Cracovia

18 October 2011	Gryf Orlex Wejherowo	1–0	Górnik Zabrze	Wejherowo
14:00 CEST (UTC+02:00)	Toporkiewicz 46'			Stadium: Stadion WKS; Attendance: 2,000; Referee: Piotr Siedlecki (Warsaw)

18 October 2011	Podbeskidzie Bielsko-Biała	0–1	Śląsk Wrocław	Bielsko Biała
18:45 CEST (UTC+02:00)			Voskamp 52'	Stadium: City Stadium; Attendance: 3,100; Referee: Marcin Szrek (Kielce)

19 October 2011	Ruch Zdzieszowice	1–0	MKS Kluczbork	Zdzieszowice
15:00 CEST (UTC+02:00)	Kasprzik 85'			Stadium: City Stadium; Attendance: 1,200; Referee: Michał Mularczyk (Skierniewice)

19 October 2011	Arka Gdynia	3–1	Polonia Warsaw	Gdynia
18:30 CEST (UTC+02:00)	Mazurkiewicz 18'; Jarzębowski 28'; Ivanovski 72'		Todorovski 49'	Stadium: Stadion GOSiR; Attendance: 4,100; Referee: Jacek Małyszek (Lublin)

25 October 2011	Polonia Bytom	1–3 (a.e.t.)	Lech Poznań	Bytom
19:30 CEST (UTC+02:00)	Paulista 16'		Wojtkowiak 57'; Rudņevs 101' (pen.), 109'	Stadium: Edward Szymkowiak Stadium; Attendance: 1,800; Referee: Marcin Borski (Warsaw)

26 October 2011	Limanovia Limanowa	1–2	Wisła Kraków	Limanowa
13:30 CEST (UTC+02:00)	Skiba 43'		Lamey 14', 51'	Stadium: Roman Szumilas Stadium; Attendance: 2,800; Referee: Paweł Raczkowski (Warsaw)

26 October 2011	Legia Warsaw	3–0	Widzew Łódź	Warsaw
18:30 CEST (UTC+02:00)	Wawrzyniak 45'; Manú 55'; Wolski 62'			Stadium: Pepsi Arena; Attendance: 11,400; Referee: Sebastian Jarzębak (Bytom)

9 November 2011	Ruch Chorzów	2–1 (a.e.t.)	Cracovia	Chorzów
18:30 CET (UTC+01:00)	Burliga 48'; Zieńczuk 120'		56' Višņakovs	Stadium: Stadion Ruchu; Attendance: 3,800; Referee: Paweł Pskit (Łódź)

== Quarter-finals ==
The 8 winners from Round 3 will compete in this round.
The matches were played in two legs. The first legs took place on 13 and 14 March 2012, while the second legs were played on 20 and 21 March 2012.

Team 1	Agg.	Team 2	1st leg	2nd leg
Gryf Orlex Wejherowo	1–4	Legia Warsaw	0–3	1–1
Lech Poznań	0–2	Wisła Kraków	0–1	0–1
Ruch Zdzieszowice	2–6	Ruch Chorzów	1–4	1–2
Arka Gdynia	3–3 (a)	Śląsk Wrocław	2–0	1–3

=== First leg ===
13 March 2012	Gryf Orlex Wejherowo	0–3	Legia Warsaw	Wejherowo
15:00 CET (UTC+01:00)			Żyro 38', 44'; Blanco 40'	Stadium: Stadion WKS; Attendance: 1,000; Referee: Adam Lyczmański (Bydgoszcz)

13 March 2012	Lech Poznań	0–1	Wisła Kraków	Poznań
18:30 CET (UTC+01:00)			Bunoza 71'	Stadium: Stadion Miejski; Attendance: 16,800; Referee: Marcin Borski (Warsaw)

14 March 2012	Ruch Zdzieszowice	1–4	Ruch Chorzów	Zdzieszowice
15:00 CET (UTC+01:00)	Buchała 10'		Malinowski 74'; Grodzicki 78'; Janoszka 87' (pen.), 90'	Stadium: Stadion Miejski; Attendance: 1,200; Referee: Tomasz Wajda (Żywiec)

14 March 2012	Arka Gdynia	2–0	Śląsk Wrocław	Gdynia
18:30 CET (UTC+01:00)	Kuklis 54'; Tomasik 80'			Stadium: Stadion GOSiR; Attendance: 4,700; Referee: Paweł Pskit (Zgierz)

=== Second leg ===
20 March 2012	Wisła Kraków	1–0	Lech Poznań	Kraków
18:30 CET (UTC+01:00)	Genkov 25'			Stadium: Stadion im. Henryka Reymana; Attendance: 15,100; Referee: Daniel Stefański (Bydgoszcz)

20 March 2012	Legia Warsaw	1–1 (4–1 agg.)	Gryf Orlex Wejherowo	Warsaw
20:30 CET (UTC+01:00)	Żyro 90+2'		Kotwica 64'	Stadium: Pepsi Arena; Attendance: 12,300; Referee: Krzysztof Jakubik (Siedlce)

21 March 2012	Śląsk Wrocław	3–1 (3–3 (a) agg.)	Arka Gdynia	Wrocław
18:30 CET (UTC+01:00)	Mila 15', 90'; Díaz 25'		Jarzębowski 14'	Stadium: Stadion Miejski; Attendance: 19,900; Referee: Marcin Borski (Warsaw)

21 March 2012	Ruch Chorzów	2–1 (6–2 agg.)	Ruch Zdzieszowice	Chorzów
20:30 CET (UTC+01:00)	Niedzielan 23', 27'		Rychlewicz 45'	Stadium: Stadion Ruchu; Attendance: 4,100; Referee: Piotr Wasielewski (Kalisz)

== Semi-finals ==
The 4 winners from the Quarterfinals will compete in this round.
The matches will be played in two legs. The first legs will take place on 3 and 4 April 2012, while the second legs will be played on 10 and 11 April 2012.
The two winners will move on to this year's Final.

Team 1	Agg.	Team 2	1st leg	2nd leg
Ruch Chorzów	4–4 (6–5 p)	Wisła Kraków	3–1	1–3 (a.e.t.)
Arka Gdynia	2–4	Legia Warsaw	1–2	1–2

=== First leg ===
3 April 2012	Ruch Chorzów	3–1	Wisła Kraków	Chorzów
18:30 CEST (UTC+02:00)	Piech 39'; Szyndrowski 68'; Abbot 75' (pen.)		Genkov 49'	Stadium: Stadion Ruchu; Attendance: 6,100; Referee: Paweł Gil (Lublin)

4 April 2012	Arka Gdynia	1–2	Legia Warsaw	Gdynia
18:30 CEST (UTC+02:00)	Mazurkiewicz 12'		Blanco 33' (pen.); Ljuboja 74'	Stadium: Stadion GOSiR; Attendance: 6,900; Referee: Paweł Pskit (Łódź)

=== Second leg ===
10 April 2012	Wisła Kraków	3–1 (4–4 agg.) (5–6 p)	Ruch Chorzów	Kraków
20:30 CEST (UTC+02:00)	Genkov 22' (pen.), 90'; Melikson 49'		Abbott 69' (pen.)	Stadium: Stadion im. Henryka Reymana; Attendance: 6,600; Referee: Marcin Borski (Warsaw)
	Penalties
	Biton (penalty missed); Garguła (penalty scored); Małecki (penalty scored); Melikson (penalty scored); Genkov (penalty scored); Díaz (penalty scored); Núñez (penalty missed)		Malinowski (penalty scored); Josl (penalty scored); Szyndrowski (penalty missed); Stawarczyk (penalty scored); Abbott (penalty scored); Piech (penalty scored); Lewczuk (penalty scored)

11 April 2012	Legia Warsaw	2–1 (4–2 agg.)	Arka Gdynia	Warsaw
18:30 CEST (UTC+02:00)	Novo 23'; Gol 89'		Kuklis 51'	Stadium: Pepsi Arena; Attendance: 14,200; Referee: Paweł Gil (Lublin)

== Final ==
24 April 2012
18:00 CEST (UTC+02:00)

Legia Warsaw	3–0	Ruch Chorzów
Ljuboja 8'; Radović 41'; Żyro 56'

Arena Kielc, Kielce
Attendance: 10,100
Referee: Hubert Siejewicz (Białystok)

== See also ==
- 2011–12 Ekstraklasa
