= 2010–11 Wisła Kraków season =

Wisła Kraków
2010–11 season
- Manager: Robert Maaskant
- Stadium: Henryk Reyman Municipal Stadium (Regular stadium); Suche Stawy (Note: Wisła Kraków played their home matches in European competitions at Suche Stawy, instead of their regular stadium, Henryk Reyman Municipal Stadium.) (Temporary stadium)
- Ekstraklasa: 1st
- Polish Cup: Quarter-finals
- UEFA Europa League: Third qualifying round
- Top goalscorer: League: Andraž Kirm (9); All: Paweł Brożek (10)
- Biggest win: 5–0 v Šiauliai (Home, 22 July 2010, UEFA Europa League)
- Biggest defeat: 1–4 v Lech Poznań (Away, 31 October 2010, Ekstraklasa)
| Home colours | Away colours | Third colours |

The 2010–11 season was Wisła Kraków's 15th consecutive season in the Ekstraklasa. In addition to the domestic league, the club participated in the Polish Cup and the UEFA Europa League.

== Squad ==
Squad at end of season

Note: Flags indicate national team as defined under FIFA eligibility rules; some limited exceptions apply. Players may hold more than one non-FIFA nationality.

| No. | Pos. | Nation | Player |
|---|---|---|---|
| 1 | GK | SRB | Milan Jovanić |
| 2 | DF | NED | Kew Jaliens |
| 4 | DF | HON | Osman Chávez |
| 5 | MF | ISR | Maor Melikson |
| 6 | DF | BIH | Gordan Bunoza |
| 7 | MF | POL | Radosław Sobolewski |
| 8 | MF | BLR | Mikhail Sivakow (on loan from (Italy) Cagliari) |
| 9 | FW | POL | Rafał Boguski |
| 10 | MF | POL | Łukasz Garguła |
| 11 | MF | POL | Wojciech Łobodziński |
| 12 | GK | POL | Filip Kurto |
| 13 | MF | GER | Dragan Paljić |
| 15 | DF | CMR | Serge Branco |

| No. | Pos. | Nation | Player |
|---|---|---|---|
| 16 | MF | CZE | Tomáš Jirsák |
| 17 | MF | SVN | Andraž Kirm |
| 18 | FW | BUL | Tsvetan Genkov |
| 19 | FW | POL | Patryk Małecki |
| 21 | FW | ARG | Andrés Ríos (on loan from (Argentina) River Plate) |
| 22 | DF | SVK | Erik Čikoš (on loan from (Slovakia) Petržalka) |
| 24 | DF | POL | Mateusz Kowalski |
| 26 | GK | EST | Sergei Pareiko |
| 28 | MF | POL | Cezary Wilk |
| 30 | MF | POL | Łukasz Burliga |
| 45 | MF | POL | Daniel Brud |
| 74 | MF | MAR | Nourdin Boukhari (on loan from (Turkey) Kasımpaşa) |
| 79 | FW | POL | Maciej Żurawski |

== Competitions ==
=== Overview ===
| Competition | First match | Last match | Starting round | Final position | Record | | | | | | | |
| Competition | First match | Last match | Starting round | Final position | Pld | W | D | L | GF | GA | GD | Win % |
|---|---|---|---|---|---|---|---|---|---|---|---|---|
| Ekstraklasa | 8 August 2010 | 29 May 2011 | Matchday 1 | Winners | 30 | 17 | 5 | 8 | 44 | 29 | +15 | 56.67 |
| Polish Cup | 21 September 2010 | 16 March 2011 | Second round | Quarter-finals | 4 | 2 | 1 | 1 | 4 | 3 | +1 | 50.00 |
| UEFA Europa League | 15 July 2010 | 5 August 2010 | Second qualifying round | Third qualifying round | 4 | 2 | 0 | 2 | 9 | 4 | +5 | 50.00 |
| Total | | | | | 38 | 21 | 6 | 11 | 57 | 36 | +21 | 55.26 |

Source: Competitions

=== Ekstraklasa ===
==== League table ====
| Pos | Team | Pld | W | D | L | GF | GA | GD | Pts | Qualification or relegation |
|---|---|---|---|---|---|---|---|---|---|---|
| 1 | Wisła Kraków (C) | 30 | 17 | 5 | 8 | 44 | 29 | +15 | 56 | Qualification to Champions League second qualifying round |
| 2 | Śląsk Wrocław | 30 | 13 | 10 | 7 | 46 | 34 | +12 | 49 (Note: ŚLĄ 0–1 LEG; LEG 1–2 ŚLĄ) | Qualification to Europa League second qualifying round |
| 3 | Legia Warsaw | 30 | 15 | 4 | 11 | 45 | 38 | +7 | 49 | Qualification to Europa League third qualifying round (Note: Winners of the 2010–11 Polish Cup.) |
| 4 | Jagiellonia Białystok | 30 | 14 | 6 | 10 | 38 | 32 | +6 | 48 | Qualification to Europa League first qualifying round |
| 5 | Lech Poznań | 30 | 13 | 6 | 11 | 37 | 23 | +14 | 45 (Note: GÓR 2–0 LPO; LPO 2–0 GÓR) | |

Source: 90minut.pl (in Polish)
Rules for classification: 1) points; 2) head-to-head points; 3) head-to-head goal difference; 4) head-to-head goals scored; 5) goal difference; 6) number of goals scored.
(C) Champions

==== Results summary ====
| Overall | | | | | | | | Home | | | | | | Away | | | | | |
| Pld | W | D | L | GF | GA | GD | Pts | W | D | L | GF | GA | GD | W | D | L | GF | GA | GD |
|---|---|---|---|---|---|---|---|---|---|---|---|---|---|---|---|---|---|---|---|
| 30 | 17 | 5 | 8 | 44 | 29 | +15 | 56 | 11 | 2 | 2 | 27 | 11 | +16 | 6 | 3 | 6 | 17 | 18 | −1 |

Source: Soccerway

==== Results by round ====
| Round | 1 | 2 | 3 | 4 | 5 | 6 | 7 | 8 | 9 | 10 | 11 | 12 | 13 | 14 | 15 | 16 | 17 | 18 | 19 | 20 | 21 | 22 | 23 | 24 | 25 | 26 | 27 | 28 | 29 | 30 |
|---|---|---|---|---|---|---|---|---|---|---|---|---|---|---|---|---|---|---|---|---|---|---|---|---|---|---|---|---|---|---|
| Ground | H | A | A | H | A | H | A | H | A | H | A | A | H | H | A | A | H | H | A | H | A | H | A | H | A | H | H | A | A | H |
| Result | W | L | W | W | L | D | D | D | L | W | L | W | W | W | W | W | W | W | D | W | D | W | L | L | W | W | W | L | W | L |
| Position | 4 | 8 | 4 | 4 | 5 | 6 | 7 | 6 | 7 | 7 | 8 | 7 | 3 | 2 | 2 | 2 | 1 | 1 | 1 | 1 | 1 | 1 | 1 | 1 | 1 | 1 | 1 | 1 | 1 | 1 |
| Points | 3 | 3 | 6 | 9 | 9 | 10 | 11 | 12 | 12 | 15 | 15 | 18 | 21 | 24 | 27 | 30 | 33 | 36 | 37 | 40 | 41 | 44 | 44 | 44 | 47 | 50 | 53 | 53 | 56 | 56 |

Source: Worldfootball
A = Away; H = Home; W = Win; D = Draw; L = Loss

==== Matches ====
| 8 August 2010 1 | Wisła Kraków | 1–0 | Arka Gdynia | Kraków |
| 19:15 CEST (UTC+2) | Małecki 24' | Report | Budziński (yellow card) 51'; Bruma (yellow card) 54'; Ivanovski (yellow card) 76' | Stadium: Henryk Reyman Municipal Stadium |

| 15 August 2010 2 | Ruch Chorzów | 2–0 | Wisła Kraków | Chorzów |
| 19:15 CEST (UTC+2) | Nykiel 21'; Straka 31'; Grodzicki (yellow card) 63' | Report | Paljić (yellow card) 54' | Stadium: Stadion Ruchu |

| 21 August 2010 3 | Widzew Łódź | 0–1 | Wisła Kraków | Łódź |
| 16:00 CEST (UTC+2) | | Report | Ríos (yellow card) 27'; Paljić 34'; Čikoš (yellow card) 48' (red card) 64'; Cléber (yellow card) 87' | Stadium: Stadion Widzewa |

| 28 August 2010 4 | Wisła Kraków | 2–1 | Polonia Bytom | Kraków |
| 14:45 CEST (UTC+2) | Małecki 20'; Bunoza (yellow card) 24'; Żurawski 53'; Cléber (yellow card) 80' | Report | Matawu 42' | Stadium: Henryk Reyman Municipal Stadium |

| 10 September 2010 5 | Jagiellonia Białystok | 2–1 | Wisła Kraków | Białystok |
| 20:00 CEST (UTC+2) | Grosicki 5'; Lato (yellow card) 36'; Frankowski 43' | Report | Pa. Brożek 4'; Cléber (yellow card) 42'; Bunoza (yellow card) 62'; Małecki (yellow card) 64'; Pawełek (red card) 75'; Kirm (yellow card) 85' | Stadium: Białystok City Stadium |

| 17 September 2010 6 | Wisła Kraków | 2–2 | Korona Kielce | Kraków |
| 20:00 CEST (UTC+2) | Pa. Brożek 44'; Wilk 73'; Sobolewski (yellow card) 90+1' | Report | Kuzera (yellow card) 31'; Vuković 49'; Jovanović (yellow card) 50'; Niedzielan 83' | Stadium: Henryk Reyman Municipal Stadium |

| 26 September 2010 7 | GKS Bełchatów | 1–1 | Wisła Kraków | Bełchatów |
| 17:00 CEST (UTC+2) | Małkowski 60', (yellow card) 78'; Vinícius (yellow card) 66'; Poźniak (yellow card) 71'; Baran (red card) 81' | Report | Cléber (yellow card) 41'; Sobolewski (yellow card) 71'; Branco (yellow card) 75'; Boguski 82' (pen.) | Stadium: Stadion GKS |

| 1 October 2010 8 | Wisła Kraków | 0–0 | Śląsk Wrocław | Kraków |
| 20:00 CEST (UTC+2) | | Report | Socha (yellow card) 29' | Stadium: Henryk Reyman Municipal Stadium |

| 7 October 2010 9 | Górnik Zabrze | 1–0 | Wisła Kraków | Zabrze |
| 17:00 CEST (UTC+2) | Marciniak (yellow card) 57'; Kwiek 83'; Stachowiak (yellow card) 90+1' | Report | Boukhari (yellow card) 39'; Cléber (yellow card) 70'; Bunoza (yellow card) 80' | Stadium: Ernest Pohl Stadium |

| 23 October 2010 10 | Wisła Kraków | 5–2 | Lechia Gdańsk | Kraków |
| 18:15 CEST (UTC+2) | Małecki 31'; Sobolewski 47'; Wilk (yellow card) 64'; Pa. Brożek 68' (pen.); Kirm 70', 84' | Report | Bąk 11'; Kožans (yellow card) 47'; Dawidowski 83' | Stadium: Henryk Reyman Municipal Stadium |

| 31 October 2010 11 | Lech Poznań | 4–1 | Wisła Kraków | Poznań |
| 17:00 CET (UTC+1) | Injac 53'; Krivets 68'; Henríquez (yellow card) 70'; Štilić 80' (pen.); Możdżeń 90+11' | Report | Sobolewski (yellow card) 36'; Pa. Brożek 50'; Wilk (yellow card) 67'; Cléber (yellow card) 76'; Chávez (yellow card) 84' | Stadium: City Stadium |

| 5 November 2010 12 | Cracovia | 0–1 | Wisła Kraków | Kraków |
| 20:00 CET (UTC+1) | Sasin (yellow card) 88' | Report | Boukhari (yellow card) 78', (goal) 90+5'; Kirm (yellow card) 88' | Stadium: Józef Piłsudski Cracovia Stadium |

| 12 November 2010 13 | Wisła Kraków | 4–0 | Legia Warsaw | Kraków |
| 20:00 CET (UTC+1) | Jirsák (yellow card) 33'; Pa. Brożek 41', 60' (pen.); Małecki 49'; Wilk 84' | Report | Makhnovskyi (yellow card) 59'; Radović (yellow card) 62' | Stadium: Henryk Reyman Municipal Stadium |

| 21 November 2010 14 | Wisła Kraków | 1–0 | Zagłębie Lubin | Kraków |
| 14:45 CET (UTC+1) | Čikoš (yellow card) 65'; Kirm 89', (yellow card) 90' | Report | Plizga (yellow card) 55'; Kocot (yellow card) 86' | Stadium: Henryk Reyman Municipal Stadium |

| 28 November 2010 15 | Polonia Warsaw | 0–1 | Wisła Kraków | Warsaw |
| 14:45 CET (UTC+1) | Tosik (yellow card) 44'; Mierzejewski (yellow card) 45'; Trałka (yellow card) 58'; Gołębiewski (yellow card) 90+3' | Report | Bunoza (yellow card) 3'; Pietrasiak 19' (o.g.); Jirsák (yellow card) 20'; Paljić (yellow card) 51'; Sobolewski (yellow card) 88' | Stadium: Stadion Polonii Warszawa |

| 25 February 2011 16 | Arka Gdynia | 0–1 | Wisła Kraków | Gdynia |
| 20:00 CET (UTC+1) | Płotka (yellow card) 27' | Report | Małecki 89', (yellow card) 90' | Stadium: Stadion GOSiR |

| 4 March 2011 17 | Wisła Kraków | 3–1 | Ruch Chorzów | Kraków |
| 20:00 CET (UTC+1) | Kirm 17'; Sivakow (yellow card) 44'; Jirsák 51'; Sobolewski (yellow card) 73'; Melikson 80' | Report | Stawarczyk (yellow card) 34'; Grzy 49' | Stadium: Henryk Reyman Municipal Stadium |

| 12 March 2011 18 | Wisła Kraków | 2–0 | Widzew Łódź | Kraków |
| 18:15 CET (UTC+1) | Małecki 44'; Kirm 78' | Report | Mielcarz (yellow card) (yellow-red card) 75' | Stadium: Henryk Reyman Municipal Stadium |

| 20 March 2011 19 | Polonia Bytom | 2–2 | Wisła Kraków | Bytom |
| 17:15 CET (UTC+1) | Radzewicz 2', (yellow card) 13'; Dziewulski (yellow card) 24'; Jarecki (yellow card) 36', (goal) 63'; Tymiński (yellow card) 61'; Hanek (yellow card) 68' | Report | Kirm 18'; Małecki 69' (pen.); Sobolewski (yellow card) 79'; Burliga (yellow card) 83' | Stadium: Stadion Edwarda Szymkowiaka |

| 3 April 2011 20 | Wisła Kraków | 2–0 | Jagiellonia Białystok | Kraków |
| 14:45 CEST (UTC+2) | Jaliens (yellow card) 12'; Kirm 26'; Jirsák (yellow card) 50'; Genkov 63'; Sivakow (yellow card) 90+2' | Report | Sotirović (yellow card) 20'; Makuszewski (yellow card) 90+2' | Stadium: Henryk Reyman Municipal Stadium |

| 10 April 2011 21 | Korona Kielce | 2–2 | Wisła Kraków | Kielce |
| 16:45 CEST (UTC+2) | Niedzielan (yellow card) 8'; Malarczyk (yellow card) 51'; Korzym (yellow card) 56', (goal) 69'; Vuković (yellow card) 56'; Wilk 90' (o.g.) | Report | Genkov 12', 66'; Sobolewski (yellow card) 30' (yellow-red card) 56' | Stadium: Kielce City Stadium |

| 15 April 2011 22 | Wisła Kraków | 3–1 | GKS Bełchatów | Kraków |
| 20:00 CEST (UTC+2) | Melikson 49'; Genkov 56'; Wilk 81' | Report | Wróbel (red card) 50'; Małkowski (yellow card) 52'; Lacić 62' | Stadium: Henryk Reyman Municipal Stadium |

| 21 April 2011 23 | Śląsk Wrocław | 2–0 | Wisła Kraków | Wrocław |
| 20:00 CEST (UTC+2) | Sobolewski 2' (o.g.); Pawelec (yellow card) 15'; Mila (yellow card) 55'; Gikiewicz 64' | Report | | Stadium: Stadion Oporowska |

| 30 April 2011 24 | Wisła Kraków | 0–2 | Górnik Zabrze | Kraków |
| 16:15 CEST (UTC+2) | Sobolewski (yellow card) 72' | Report | Bemben (yellow card) 14'; Gašparík 24', (yellow card) 56'; Danch (yellow card) 31'; Sikorski 81', (yellow card) 85'; Marciniak (yellow card) 90+2' | Stadium: Henryk Reyman Municipal Stadium |

| 8 May 2011 25 | Lechia Gdańsk | 0–3 | Wisła Kraków | Gdańsk |
| 14:45 CEST (UTC+2) | | Report | Genkov 17'; Kirm 30'; Paljić (yellow card) 34'; Sivakow 87' | Stadium: MOSiR Stadium |

| 11 May 2011 26 | Wisła Kraków | 1–0 | Lech Poznań | Kraków |
| 20:00 CEST (UTC+2) | Genkov 73'; Wilk (yellow card) 90' | Report | Henríquez (yellow card) 17'; Wołąkiewicz (yellow card) 29'; Štilić (yellow card) 89' | Stadium: Henryk Reyman Municipal Stadium |

| 15 May 2011 27 | Wisła Kraków | 1–0 | Cracovia | Kraków |
| 14:45 CEST (UTC+2) | Melikson 17'; Chávez (yellow card) 39'; Wilk (yellow card) 56'; Sobolewski (yellow card) 83' | Report | Bartczak (yellow card) 15'; Radomski (yellow card) 19' | Stadium: Henryk Reyman Municipal Stadium |

| 21 May 2011 28 | Legia Warsaw | 2–0 | Wisła Kraków | Warsaw |
| 15:45 CEST (UTC+2) | Cabral 45' (pen.); Szałachowski 90' | Report | Pareiko (red card) 44' | Stadium: Polish Army Stadium |

| 25 May 2011 29 | Zagłębie Lubin | 0–3 | Wisła Kraków | Lubin |
| 19:00 CEST (UTC+2) | Hanzel (yellow card) 41'; Plizga (yellow card) 42'; Woźniak (yellow card) 77' | Report | Kirm 41'; Brud (yellow card) 49'; Melikson 57' (pen.); Burliga (yellow card) 59'; Čikoš (yellow card) 88'; Ríos 90' | Stadium: Dialog Arena |

| 29 May 2011 30 | Wisła Kraków | 0–2 | Polonia Warsaw | Kraków |
| 17:00 CEST (UTC+2) | Burliga (yellow card) 55' | Report | Coutinho (yellow card) 2'; Smolarek 22'; Trałka 39', (yellow card) 74' | Stadium: Henryk Reyman Municipal Stadium |

=== Polish Cup ===
| 21 September 2010 Second round | Dolcan Ząbki | 0–1 | Wisła Kraków | Ząbki |
| 15:00 CEST (UTC+2) | | Report | | Stadium: Stadion Miejski |

| 26 October 2010 Third round | Wisła Kraków | 1–0 | Widzew Łódź | Kraków |
| 20:30 CEST (UTC+2) | | Report | | Stadium: Henryk Reyman Municipal Stadium |

| 1 March 2011 Quarter-finals First leg | Wisła Kraków | 0–1 | Podbeskidzie Bielsko-Biała | Kraków |
| 20:30 CET (UTC+1) | | Report | Malinowski 88'; Ziajka (yellow card) (yellow-red card) 90' | Stadium: Henryk Reyman Municipal Stadium |

| 16 March 2011 Quarter-finals Second leg | Podbeskidzie Bielsko-Biała | 2–2 (3–2 agg.) | Wisła Kraków | Bielsko-Biała |
| 20:30 CET (UTC+1) | Cieśliński 58'; Górkiewicz 75' | Report | Łatka 24'; Genkov 52' | Stadium: Bielsko-Biała Stadium |
Note: Podbeskidzie Bielsko-Biała won 3–2 on aggregate.

=== UEFA Europa League ===
==== Qualifying ====
===== Second qualifying round =====
| 15 July 2010 First leg | Šiauliai (Lithuania) | 0–2 | (Poland) Wisła Kraków | Šiauliai, Lithuania |
| 21:00 EEST (UTC+3) | Jasaitis (yellow card) 2' | Report | Pa. Brożek 78'; Pi. Brożek 80' | Stadium: Savivaldybė Stadium; Attendance: 2,400; Referee: Meir Levi (Israel); Assistant referees: Shmuel Shteif (Israel), Sharon Eyal (Israel); Fourth official: Alon Yefet (Israel) |

| 22 July 2010 Second leg | Wisła Kraków (Poland) | 5–0 (7–0 agg.) | (Lithuania) Šiauliai | Kraków, Poland |
| 20:00 CEST (UTC+2) | Pi. Brożek 23'; Żurawski 48'; Díaz 62'; Pa. Brożek 66'; Boguski 90+1' | Report | Kančelskis (red card) 17'; Lunskis (yellow card) 74' | Stadium: Suche Stawy; Attendance: 5,500; Referee: João Ferreira (Portugal); Assistant referees: Venâncio Tomé (Portugal), Ricardo Santos (Portugal); Fourth official: João Capela (Portugal) |
Note: Wisła Kraków won 7–0 on aggregate.

===== Third qualifying round =====
| 29 July 2010 First leg | Wisła Kraków (Poland) | 0–1 | (Azerbaijan) Qarabağ | Kraków, Poland |
| 20:00 CEST (UTC+2) | Bunoza (yellow card) 51' (yellow-red card) 83'; Żurawski (penalty missed) 90+1' | Report | Nadirov 69' | Stadium: Suche Stawy; Attendance: 4,200; Referee: Tom Harald Hagen (Norway); Assistant referees: Svein Inge Wiken (Norway), Sven Erik Midthjell (Norway); Fourth official: Kristoffer Helgerud (Norway) |

| 5 August 2010 Second leg | Qarabağ (Azerbaijan) | 3–2 (4–2 agg.) | (Poland) Wisła Kraków | Baku, Azerbaijan (Note: The match was played at the Tofiq Bahramov Stadium in Baku, instead of Qarabağ regular stadium, the Guzanli Olympic Stadium, in Quzanlı, which did not meet UEFA requirements.) |
| 21:00 AZST (UTC+5) | Ismayilov 28'; Aliyev 33'; Sadygov 35' | Report | Pa. Brożek 56'; Żurawski (yellow card) 65'; Małecki (yellow card) 73'; Boguski 88' | Stadium: Tofiq Bahramov Stadium; Attendance: 29,500; Referee: Bülent Yıldırım (Turkey); Assistant referees: Emre Eyisoy (Turkey), Çem Satman (Turkey); Fourth official: Hakan Ceylan (Turkey) |
Note: Qarabağ won 4–2 on aggregate.
