= List of football stadiums in Poland =

The following is a list of football stadiums in Poland, ranked in order of capacity, with the minimum capacity being 4,000.

== Current stadiums ==
#	Image	Stadium	Capacity	City	Province	Home team	UEFA rank
1		Kazimierz Górski PGE National Stadium	58,580	Warsaw	Masovian	Poland national football team	4/4 stars
2		Superauto.pl Silesian Stadium	54,378	Chorzów	Silesian	Poland national football team Ruch Chorzów	4/4 stars
3		ENEA Stadium	42,837	Poznań	Greater Poland	Lech Poznań	4/4 stars
4		Tarczyński Arena Wrocław	42,771	Wrocław	Lower Silesian	Śląsk Wrocław	4/4 stars
5		Polsat Plus Arena Gdańsk	41,620	Gdańsk	Pomeranian	Lechia Gdańsk	4/4 stars
6		Henryk Reyman Synerise Arena	33,130	Kraków	Lesser Poland	Wisła Kraków; Wieczysta Kraków	4/4 stars
7		Polish Army Stadium	31,006	Warsaw	Masovian	Legia Warsaw	4/4 stars
8		Ernest Pohl Stadium	28,499	Zabrze	Silesian	Górnik Zabrze	4/4 stars
9		RKS Skra Stadium	25,000	Warsaw	Masovian	KS Warszawianka; RKS Skra Warszawa	
10		Chorten Arena	22,372	Białystok	Podlaskie	Jagiellonia Białystok	4/4 stars
11		Florian Krygier Stadium	21,163	Szczecin	West Pomeranian	Pogoń Szczecin	4/4 stars
12		Zdzisław Krzyszkowiak Stadium	20,559	Bydgoszcz	Kuyavian-Pomeranian	Zawisza Bydgoszcz	3/4 stars
13		Władysław Król Stadium	18,029	Łódź	Łódź Voivodeship	ŁKS Łódź	3/4 stars
14		Widzew Stadium	18,018	Łódź	Łódź Voivodeship	Widzew Łódź	3/4 stars
15		KGHM Zagłębie Arena	16,086	Lubin	Lower Silesian	Zagłębie Lubin	3/4 stars
16		EXBUD Arena	15,550	Kielce	Świętokrzyskie	Korona Kielce	3/4 stars
17		Motor Lublin Arena	15,247	Lublin	Lublin Voivodeship	Motor Lublin	3/4 stars
18		Tychy Stadium	15,150	Tychy	Silesian	GKS Tychy	3/4 stars
19		GOSiR Stadium	15,139	Gdynia	Pomeranian	Arka Gdynia; Bałtyk Gdynia	3/4 stars
20		Arena Katowice	15,048	Katowice	Silesian	GKS Katowice	3/4 stars
21		Marshal Józef Piłsudski Stadium	15,016	Kraków	Lesser Poland	Cracovia	3/4 stars
22		Kazimierz Górski Orlen Stadium	15,004	Płock	Masovian	Wisła Płock	3/4 stars
23		BBOSiR Stadium	14,963	Bielsko-Biała	Silesian	Podbeskidzie Bielsko-Biała; BKS Stal Bielsko-Biała	3/4 stars
24		The Swallow's Nest Stadium	14,790	Tarnów	Lesser Poland	Unia Tarnów	
25		Czachor Brothers Stadium	14,440	Radom	Masovian	Radomiak Radom	3/4 stars
26		Gdańsk Sports Center Stadium	11,600	Gdańsk	Pomeranian	Lechia Gdańsk Ladies	
27		ArcelorMittal Park	11,600	Sosnowiec	Silesian	Zagłębie Sosnowiec	4/4 stars
28		Itaka Arena	11,600	Opole	Opole Voivodeship	Odra Opole	3/4 stars
29		Stal Stadium	11,547	Rzeszów	Subcarpathian	Stal Rzeszów	
30		MOSiR Stadium	10,304	Rybnik	Silesian	ROW 1964 Rybnik	
31		Piotr Wieczorek Stadium	10,037	Gliwice	Silesian	Piast Gliwice	3/4 stars
32		Oporowska Stadium	8,346	Wrocław	Lower Silesian	Śląsk Wrocław II	
33		Sandecja Stadium	8,111	Nowy Sącz	Lesser Poland	Sandecja Nowy Sącz	3/4 stars
34		Subcarpathian Athletics Center	8,000	Rzeszów	Subcarpathian	Resovia	3/4 stars

== Others football stadiums ==
Stadiums with a capacity of at least 3,500 are included.

Image	Stadium	Capacity	City	Home team	Opened
	Górnik Łęczna Stadium	7,464	Łęczna	Górnik Łęczna	2003
	MOSiR Stadium	7,401	Krosno	Karpaty Krosno	2026
	General Kazimierz Sosnkowski Stadium	7,150	Warsaw	Polonia Warsaw	1928
	Grzegorz Lato Stadium	6,864	Mielec	Stal Mielec	2013
	Jastrzębie-Zdrój Municipal Stadium	6,800	Jastrzębie-Zdrój	GKS Jastrzębie-Zdrój	1989
	GKS Katowice Stadium	6,710	Katowice	GKS Katowice	1955
	Suche Stawy Stadium	6,500	Kraków	Hutnik Kraków	1950
	White Eagle Stadium	6,156	Legnica	Miedź Legnica	1948
	SOSiR Stadium	6,000	Słubice	Polonia Słubice	1927
	zondacrypto Arena	5,500	Częstochowa	Raków Częstochowa	1955
	Edward Szymkowiak Stadium	5,500	Bytom	Polonia Bytom	1929
	Respect Energy Stadium	5,383	Grodzisk Wielkopolski	Nasza Dyskobolia Grodzisk Wielkopolski	1925
	Bronisław Malinowski Stadium	5,323	Grudziądz	Olimpia Grudziądz	1973
	Amica Stadium	5,296	Wronki	Błękitni Wronki; Lech Poznań II	1992
	GIEKSA Arena	5,264	Bełchatów	GKS Bełchatów	1977
	Odra Stadium	5,060	Opole	Odra Opole	1930
	OSiR Stadium	5,000	Gorzów Wielkopolski	Stilon Gorzów Wielkopolski	1929
	Ostróda Municipal Stadium	4,998	Ostróda	Sokół Ostróda	2011
	Bruk-Bet Stadium	4,653	Nieciecza	Bruk-Bet Termalica Nieciecza	2007
	Athletics and Football Stadium	4,500	Radom	Broń Radom	2013
	Municipal Stadium	4,500	Chełm	Chełmianka Chełm	2026
	OSiR Stadium	4,500	Olsztyn	Stomil Olsztyn	1978
	Subcarpathian Football Center	3,764	Stalowa Wola	Stal Stalowa Wola	2020

== Future football stadiums ==
Stadiums with a capacity of at least 4,000 are included.

Stadium	Capacity	City	Home team	Opening
RKS Skra Stadium	25,000	Warsaw	Skra Warsaw	2027
Ruch Chorzów Stadium	22,000	Chorzów	Ruch Chorzów	2028
General Kazimierz Sosnkowski Stadium	16,000	Warsaw	Polonia Warsaw	2031
MOSiR Stadium	15,000	Rybnik	KS ROW 1964 Rybnik	2029
Marshal Józef Piłsudski Stadium	13,000	Bydgoszcz	Polonia Bydgoszcz	TBD
OSiR Stadium	10,000	Gorzów Wielkopolski	Stilon Gorzów Wielkopolski	TBD
OSiR Stadium (Olsztyn)	10,000	Olsztyn	Stomil Olsztyn	2031
Suche Stawy Stadium	8,051	Kraków	Hutnik Kraków	TBD
Stanisław Figas Stadium	8,000	Koszalin	Gwardia Koszalin	TBD
Dębińska Road Stadium	5,000	Poznań	Warta Poznań	TBD
Garbarnia Stadium	4,500	Kraków	Garbarnia Kraków	TBD

== See also ==
- List of European stadiums by capacity
- List of association football stadiums by capacity
- List of association football stadiums by country
- List of sports venues by capacity
- Lists of stadiums
