= Sports and Recreation Center (Poland) =

Municipal sports centres in Poland

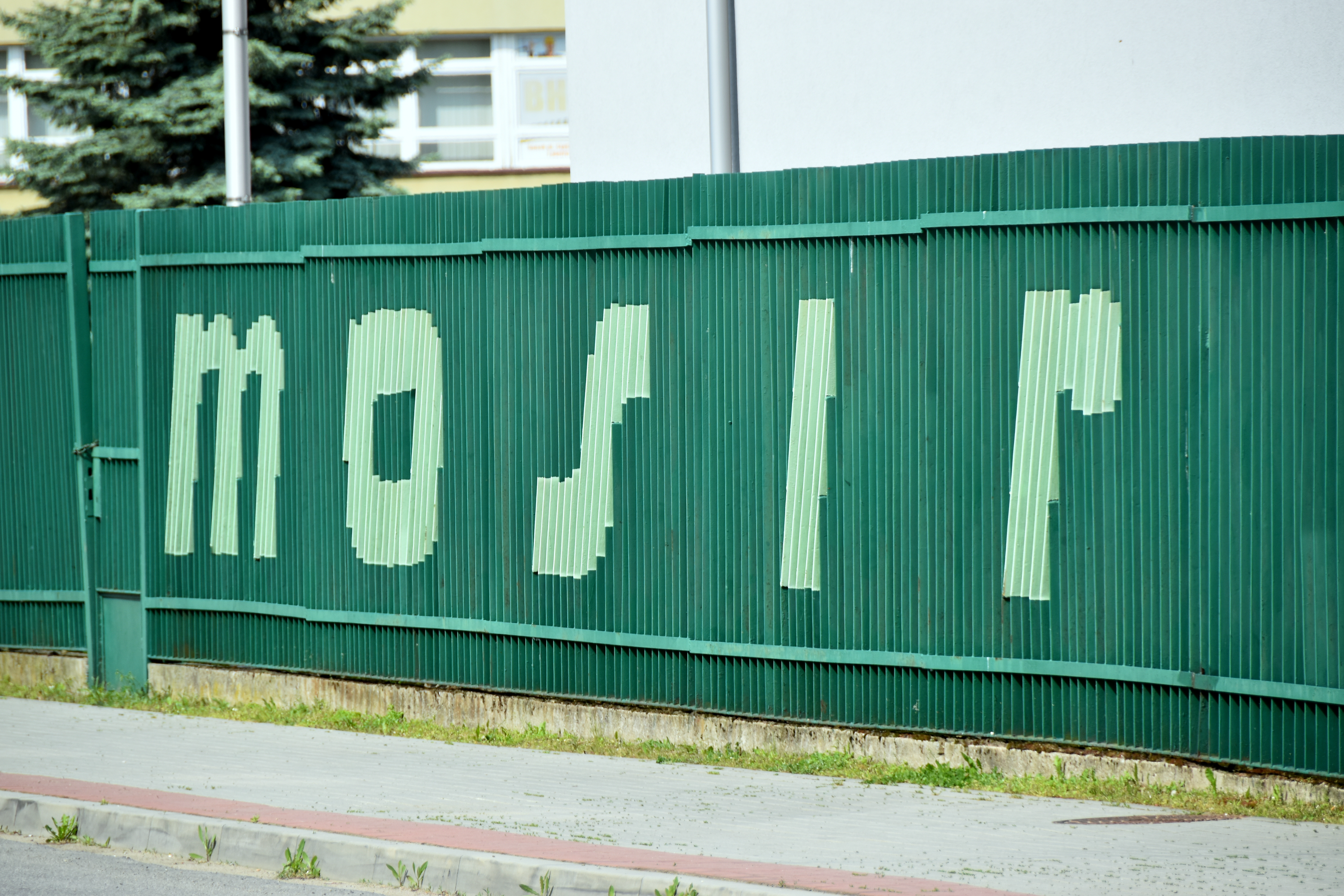
Stal Sanok's MOSiR stadium

The Sports and Recreation Center (Polish: Ośrodek Sportu i Rekreacji, OSiR) is an entity dedicated to promoting physical culture, sports, and recreational activities among the residents of a particular locality, primarily in Poland. Its responsibilities include maintaining sports facilities, managing sports sections, and organizing competitions at local and higher levels. In many cities, such centers operate under the name Municipal Sports and Recreation Center (Miejski Ośrodek Sportu i Rekreacji, MOSiR).

These centers are typically public entities funded by local government budgets, sponsor donations, and subsidies from the European Union.

== OSiR or MOSiR stadiums ==
- OSiR Stadium, Olsztyn
- OSiR Stadium, Gorzów Wielkopolski
- OSiR Skalka
- MOSiR Stadium, Bystrzyca
- MOSiR Stadium, Stalowa Wola
- MOSiR Stadium, Wodzisław Śląski
- MOSiR Stadium, Krosno
- MOSiR Stadium, Gdańsk
- White Eagle Municipal Stadium, Legnica
- Hala OSiR Bemowo
- SOSiR Stadium

== See also ==
- List of indoor arenas in Poland
- List of football stadiums in Poland
