= Paschal Ekwueme =

Nigerian footballer (born 1982)

Paschal Ekweme
Personal information
- Full name: Obinna Paschal, Ekwueme
- Date of birth: 6 June 1982 (age 44)
- Place of birth: Abou, Nigeria
- Height: 1.83 m (6 ft 0 in)
- Position: Winger

Senior career*
Years	Team	Apps	(Gls)
2000	Agunze Okigwe		
2000–2001	Polonia Warsaw II		
2001–2002	→ Legia Warsaw II (loan)		
2002–2004	Sigma Olomouc	8	(2)
2004	Widzew Łódź	6	(1)
2005	Olympiacos Volos	0	(0)
2006–2007	Proodeftiki	17	(1)
2008–2010	Czarni Żagań	34	(15)
2010–2011	Olimpia Grudziądz	25	(6)
2011–2012	MKS Kluczbork	22	(3)
2012–2013	Pogoń Siedlce	23	(6)
2013–2014	Pelikan Łowicz	20	(6)
2014–2015	CK Troszyn		
2015	Mazovia Mińsk Mazowiecki		
2015	Mazovia Rawa Mazowiecka		
2016	SV Gnaschwitz-Doberschau	7	(6)
2016–2017	TSV Wacker 50 Neutraubling	10	(6)
2017–2018	VFR Regensburg		
- * Club domestic league appearances and goals

Paschal Ekwueme (born 6 June 1982) is a Nigerian former professional footballer who played as a winger.

== Honours ==
Olimpia Grudziądz

- II liga West: 2010–11
