= Szary =

Szary is a Polish surname. Notable people with the surname include:

- Sebastian Szary (born 1975), German musician
- Sławomir Szary (born 1979), Polish footballer

== See also ==
- Shary (disambiguation)
