= Brud =

Brud is a given name and surname. Notable people with the name include:

- Brud Talbot (1938–1986), American film actor, producer, director, and writer
- Daniel Brud (born 1989), Polish footballer
- Lulu Brud (born 1985), American actress and interior designer
