= Kocot =

Kocot is a Polish surname and like the related Kohut, Kohout (from Slovak kohút) or Kogut (from Polish kogut) derived from a Proto-Slavic root word (*kokotъ) for "rooster" and a nickname for a conceited or sexually active man. Notable people with the surname include:

- Benedykt Kocot (born 1954), Polish cyclist
- Noelle Kocot, American poet
- Peter Kocot (1956–2018), American politician
- Przemysław Kocot (born 1986), Polish footballer
