= Abou =

Abou is both a given name and a surname. It may refer to:

- Ayoub Abou (born 1998), Moroccan footballer
- Samassi Abou (born 1973), Ivorian footballer
- Abou Diaby (born 1986), French footballer
- Abou Maïga (born 1985), Beninese footballer
- Basel Abbas and Ruanne Abou-Rahme, artist duo
- Abou Ben Adhem (poem), fictional protagonist in an 1814 poem by Leigh Hunt

== See also ==
- Abou Greisha
