= Javier Merida =

Spanish paratriathlete

Personal information
- Nationality: Spanish
- Born: 15 April 1973 (age 53) Marbella, Spain

Sport
- Sport: Paratriathlon
Medal record
Men's paratriathlon
Representing Spain
European Championships
Silver medal – second place	2011 Pontevedra	TRI 2

Javier Merida (born 15 April 1973) is a Spanish athlete best known for competing in paratriathlon. He was born in Marbella and lost his leg in a traffic accident in 2007, after which he began training for paratriathlon. Some of his more notable successes include several championships of Spanish paratriathlon, a European championship of paratriathlon, as well as being world vice champion in paraduathlon.

One of his accomplishments includes being the first disabled person from Spain to cross the English channel in 2013. He mentions that his next goal would be crossing Loch Ness. He also states that he intends to train for the 2016 Summer Paralympics in Rio de Janeiro which will introduce his discipline of paratriathlon for the first time.

Javier Merida is a brand ambassador of Bulgarian company TRYMAX.
