= Shary =

Shary or Shariy (Ukrainian: Шарій, Belarusian: Шарый, Russian: Шарий or Шарый) may refer to:

- Anatoly Shariy (born 1978), Ukrainian videoblogger
- Andrey Shary (born 1965), Russian journalist and author
- Ivan Shariy (born 1957), Ukrainian footballer
- John H. Shary (1872–1945), American farmer and entrepreneur
- Timothy Shary (born 1967), American film scholar
- Valery Shary (born 1947), Belarusian weightlifter

== See also ==
- Szary (disambiguation)
