= MOSiR Stadium (Wodzisław Śląski) =

Sports venue in Wodzisław Śląski, Poland

Coordinates: 49°59′54″N 18°27′25″E

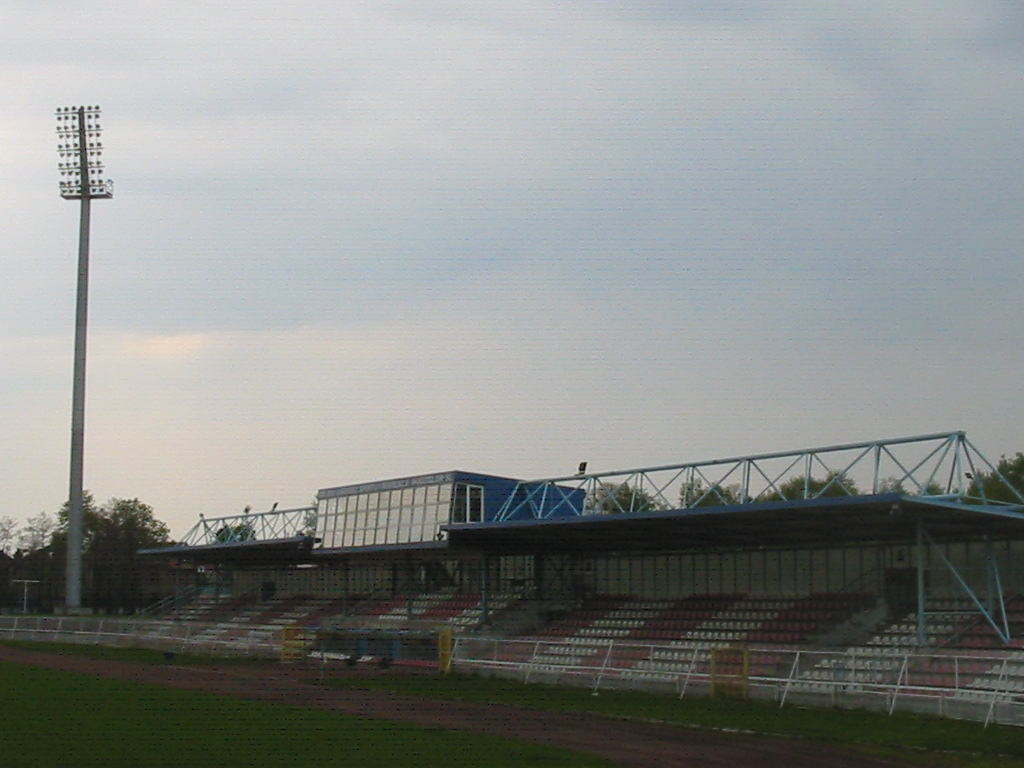
Stadium MOSiR in Wodzisław Śląski.

MOSiR Stadion is a multi-purpose stadium in Wodzisław Śląski, Poland. It is used mostly for football matches and served as the home stadium of Odra Wodzisław.

The stadium has a capacity of 7,400 people. Its facilities include heated turf, floodlights emitting 2,000 lux, tennis courts, gymnasium, and office building.

In 2007 Zagłębie Sosnowiec, 2008-2011 Piast Gliwice and in 2011, Podbeskidzie Bielsko-Biała began using the stadium while their own ground was undergoing reconstruction work. In 2012 it also hosted Pre-season two friendly matches Karpaty Lviv.
