= TRYMAX =

Bulgarian company

Trymax
- Company type: Private company
- Industry: Sports goods
- Founded: 2010
- Headquarters: Sofia, Bulgaria
- Website: www.trymax.net/promo/

Trymax is a Bulgarian manufacturer of sports accessories, with its primary hub for business operations in Sofia, Bulgaria. The manufacturing processes are distributed between the United States and China, while product distribution is managed through various regional offices in Dubai, Moscow, and Marbella.

== Brand ambassadors ==
The company has numerous representatives in different sports such as:

- Tsvetan Genkov – Bulgarian footballer – striker with spells at Dynamo Moscow, Wisła Kraków and is currently at Levski Sofia
- Javier Merida - Spanish paratriathlete European champion
- Kiril Terziev – Bulgarian freestyle wrestler – bronze medal winner at the 2008 Summer Olympics in Beijing in his category (up to 74 kg).
