= Abo Gresha =

Abo Greisha is a surname. Notable people with the surname include:

- Ali Abo Gresha (born 1947), Egyptian footballer
- Mohamed Mohsen Abo Gresha (born 1981), Egyptian footballer
- Mohamed Salah Abo Gresha (born 1970), Egyptian footballer
