= SOSiR Stadium =

Association football venue in Słubice, Poland

- "Polonia Stadium" "Lubusz Stadium"
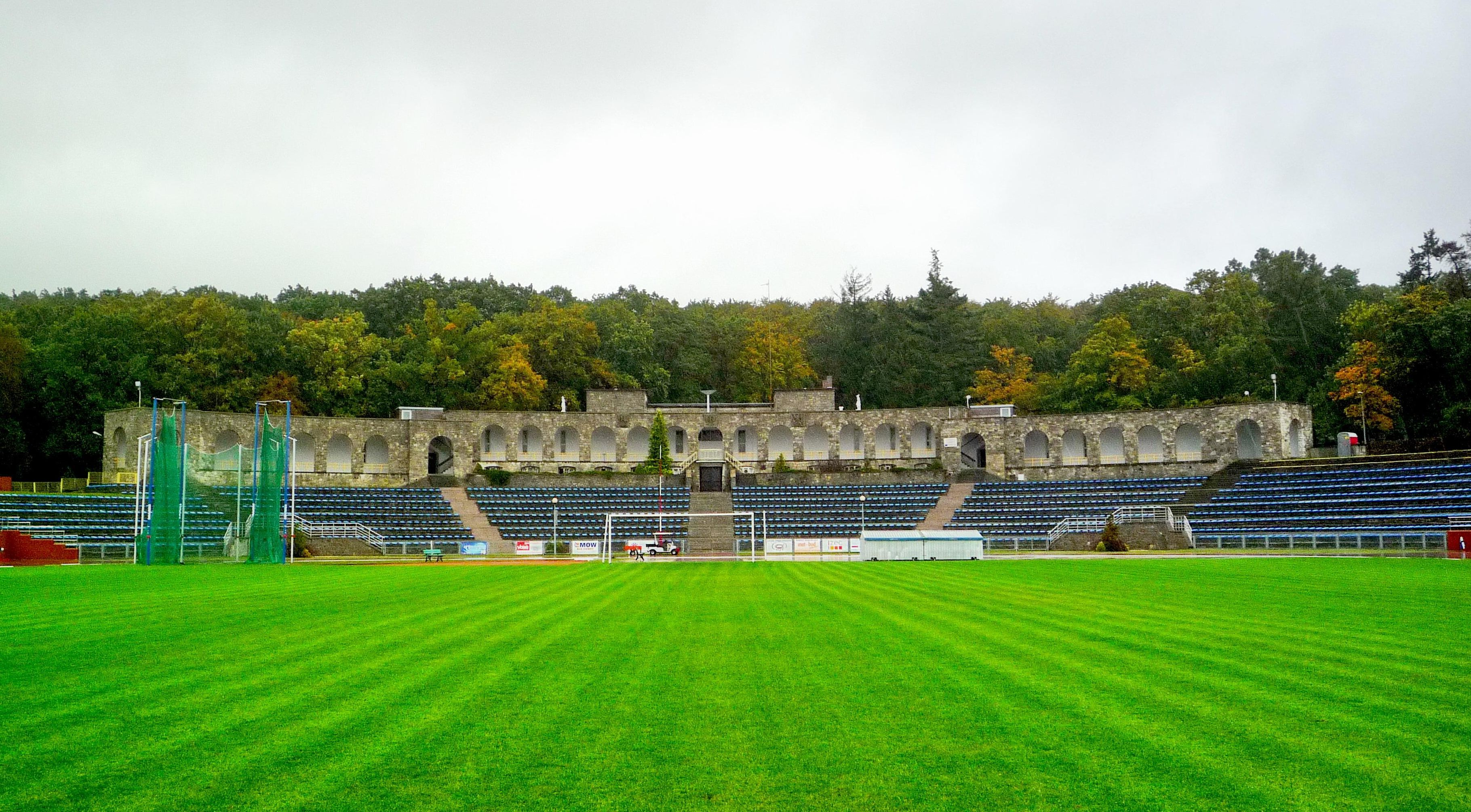
- SOSiR Stadium in Słubice
- Interactive map of SOSiR Stadium
- Full name: Stadion Słubickiego Ośrodka Sportu i Rekreacji w Słubicach
- Former names: Ostmarkstadion; OSiR Stadium
- Location: Słubice, Poland
- Coordinates: 52°20′42.03″N 14°35′23.63″E
- Owner: SOSiR Słubice
- Capacity: 6,000 (3,056 seated)
- Surface: Grass
- Field size: 106 × 60 m

Construction
- Groundbreaking: 1914
- Opened: May 1927
- Renovated: 2003

Tenant
- MKS Polonia Słubice

The SOSiR Stadium (pol. Stadion SOSiR) (locally known as the Lubusz Stadium (pol. Stadion Lubuski) or Polonia Stadium (pol. Stadion Polonii)) is a multi-purpose stadium in Słubice, Poland, home of the football club Polonia Słubice. It is located just east of the Oder river close to the German border.

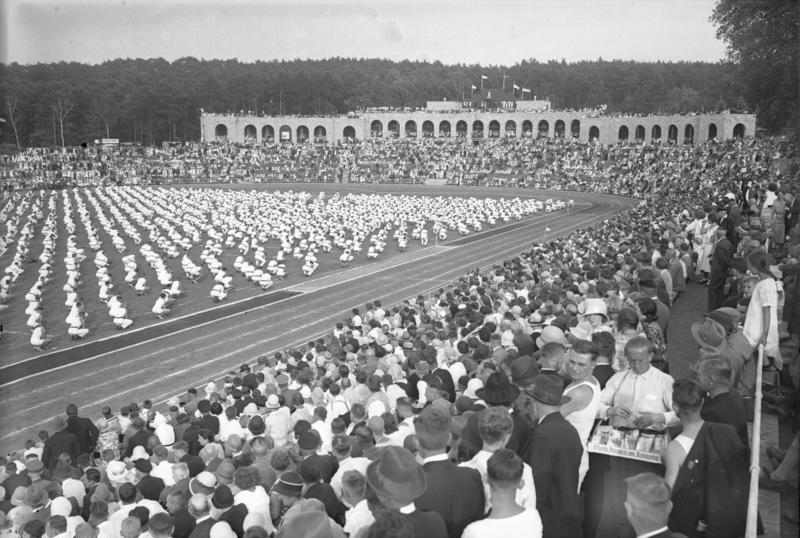
Brandenburgian gymnastics festival, July 1930

Building work on the 16-acre (65,000 m^{2}) complex employing Russian prisoners of war commenced in spring of 1914, when present-day Słubice was still part of German Frankfurt (Oder), but due to the effects of World War I wasn't completed until 1927. Despite its name and contrary to common belief, the Olympic Stadium (originally named Ostmarkstadion) was not built for the 1936 Summer Olympics.

With the implementation of the Oder–Neisse line, the area passed to the Republic of Poland in 1945. The stadium underwent a complete refurbishment in 2003. It now counts as one of the oldest stadia in Poland with its historical south-eastern tribune reminiscent of an amphitheatre.
