= Clement Matawu =

Zimbabwean footballer (born 1982)

Personal information
- Full name: Clemence Matawu
- Date of birth: 29 November 1982 (age 43)
- Place of birth: Bindura, Zimbabwe
- Height: 1.77 m (5 ft 9 1/2 in)
- Position: Midfielder

Senior career*
Years	Team	Apps	(Gls)
2001–2013	Motor Action		
2009–2010	→ Podbeskidzie (loan)	39	(5)
2010–2011	→ Polonia Bytom (loan)	8	(1)
2013–2019	Chicken Inn		

International career
2003–2010	Zimbabwe	29	(1)
- * Club domestic league appearances and goals

Clemence Matawu (born 29 November 1982 in Bindura) is a Zimbabwean former professional footballer who played as a midfielder.

== Club ==
Matawu started his career with Motor Action of Harare. In early 2009, he joined Polish club Podbeskidzie Bielsko-Biała for a loan spell lasting until mid-2010. He established himself in the starting line-up and made a total of 40 appearances across all competitions, before joining Ekstraklasa club Polonia Bytom in the summer of 2010. After a year with the Silesian club, Clement was released and returned to Motor Action.

== International ==
Matawu had a colorful international career, making 29 appearances and scoring once for the Zimbabwe national team.

== Education ==
While playing for Chicken Inn, Matawu attained a Bachelor of Science Honors Degree in Sport Science and Coaching from NUST.
