= Patryk Tuszyński =

Polish footballer (born 1989)

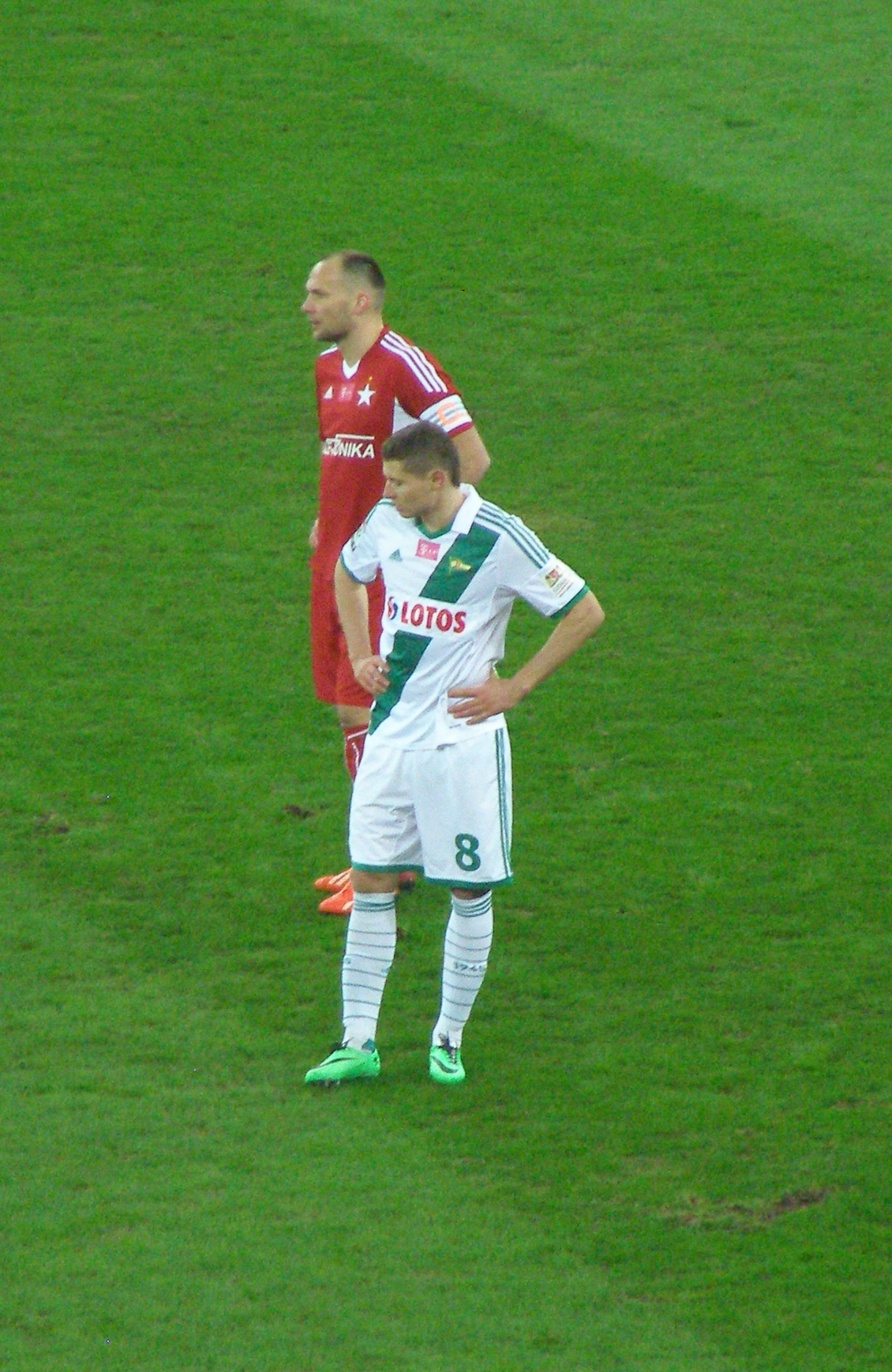
- Tuszyński playing for Lechia Gdańsk in 2014

Personal information
- Full name: Patryk Tuszyński
- Date of birth: 13 December 1989 (age 36)
- Place of birth: Syców, Poland
- Height: 1.84 m (6 ft 1/2 in)
- Position: Striker

Team information
- Current team: MKS Kluczbork
- Number: 8

Youth career
- Marcinki Kępno
- Gawin Królewska Wola

Senior career*
| Years | Team | Apps | (Gls) |
| 2007–2008 | Gawin Królewska Wola | 12 | (0) |
| 2008 | Gawin/Ślęza Wrocław | 14 | (1) |
| 2009–2011 | MKS Kluczbork | 97 | (17) |
| 2012–2014 | Lechia Gdańsk | 33 | (6) |
| 2013 | → Sandecja Nowy Sącz (loan) | 14 | (6) |
| 2014–2015 | Jagiellonia Białystok | 38 | (16) |
| 2015–2017 | Çaykur Rizespor | 33 | (2) |
| 2017–2019 | Zagłębie Lubin | 61 | (15) |
| 2019–2020 | Piast Gliwice | 31 | (1) |
| 2020–2022 | Wisła Płock | 45 | (6) |
| 2022–2023 | Chojniczanka Chojnice | 32 | (5) |
| 2023– | MKS Kluczbork | 84 | (28) |
- * Club domestic league appearances and goals as of 19:30, 3 June 2026 (UTC)

Patryk Tuszyński (born 13 December 1989) is a Polish professional footballer who plays as a striker for III liga club MKS Kluczbork.

== Club career ==
Tuszyński started his football career in Marcinki Kępno, from where he moved to Gawin Królewska Wola. On 11 August 2020, Tuszyński joined Wisła Płock, signing a two–year contract.

== International career ==
Tuszyński got his first call up to the senior Poland squad for friendlies against Georgia and Greece in June 2015.

== Honours ==
MKS Kluczbork

- II liga West: 2008–09
- Polish Cup (Opole regionals): 2023–24, 2025–26
