= Sokół Sokółka =

Polish football club

- Full name: Klub Sportowy Sokół 1946 Sokółka
- Founded: 1946; 80 years ago
- Ground: Municipal Stadium
- Capacity: 2,500
- Manager: Radosław Kabelis
- League: Regional league Podlaskie
- 2023–24: Regional league Podlaskie, 6th of 16
Home colours	Away colours

Sokół Sokółka is a Polish football club based in Sokółka. As of the 2024–25 season, they compete in the regional league. The team's colors are blue and red.
