= Tsvetan Genkov =

Bulgarian footballer (born 1984)

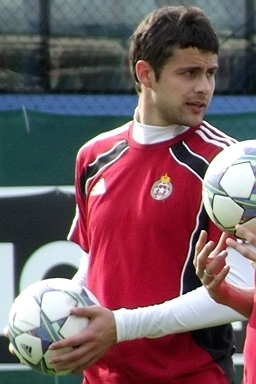
- Genkov with Wisła Kraków in 2011

Personal information
- Full name: Tsvetan Valentinov Genkov
- Date of birth: 8 February 1984 (age 42)
- Place of birth: Mezdra, Bulgaria
- Height: 1.86 m (6 ft 1 in)
- Position: Striker

Team information
- Current team: Kostinbrod
- Number: 8

Youth career
- Lokomotiv Mezdra

Senior career*
Years	Team	Apps	(Gls)
2001–2004	Lokomotiv Mezdra	72	(39)
2004–2007	Lokomotiv Sofia	86	(50)
2007–2010	Dynamo Moscow	37	(4)
2010	→ Lokomotiv Sofia (loan)	26	(15)
2011–2013	Wisła Kraków	55	(17)
2013–2014	Levski Sofia	27	(5)
2014–2016	Denizlispor	50	(16)
2016	Lokomotiv GO	9	(0)
2017	Okzhetpes	12	(1)
2020–	Kostinbrod	30	(15)

International career
2004–2006	Bulgaria U-21	9	(3)
2005–2011	Bulgaria	17	(0)
- * Club domestic league appearances and goals as of 31 August 2017

Tsvetan Valentinov Genkov (Bulgarian: Цветан Валентинов Генков; born 8 February 1984) is a Bulgarian professional footballer who plays as a striker for OFK Kostinbrod.

== Career ==
=== Lokomotiv Mezdra ===
Born in Mezdra, Genkov began his career in the local Lokomotiv, previously having been a track and field athlete. He made his debut during the 2001–02 season on 14 October 2001 in a 0–2 away loss against Sitomir Nikopol in the campaign of V AFG. On 12 May 2002, Genkov scored his first goal in a 2–2 home draw against Olimpik Teteven. As of the 2002–03 season he became first-choice forward scoring 14 goals. After 24 goals in the next season he transferred to Lokomotiv Sofia.

=== Lokomotiv Sofia ===
He made his debut for Lokomotiv Sofia on 6 August 2004, in a 0–2 away loss against Litex Lovech. In Sofia, Genkov established himself in one of the leading A PFG clubs and helped his team to reach the fourth place in 2005–06 and secure a place in the 2006–07 UEFA Cup. During the qualification rounds, Genkov scored four goals in six matches. In Bulgaria's A PFG, he became the top goalscorer of 2006–07 with 27 goals, leading Lokomotiv to the third position and 2007–08 UEFA Cup qualification.

=== Dynamo Moscow ===
On 9 June 2007, he signed a four-and-a-half-year contract with Dynamo Moscow for a transfer fee of €2.25 million.

=== Return to Lokomotiv Sofia ===
In January 2010, Genkov was loaned out to his former club. On 7 March 2010, he netted twice in the 5–1 away win against FC Sportist Svoge. In the following season, with 11 goals to his name, Genkov had climbed up to second place in the scoring charts in the A PFG by the time his loan expired.

=== Wisła Kraków ===
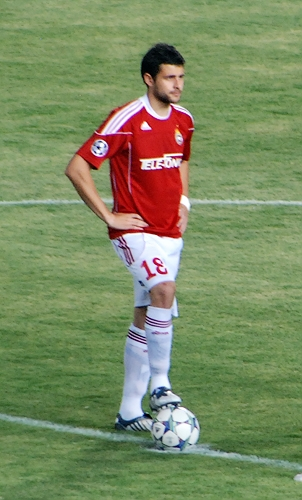
Genkov playing for Wisła

On 28 January 2011, Genkov joined Polish Ekstraklasa side Wisła Kraków on a three-and-a-half-year deal for an undisclosed fee from Dynamo Moscow. He won the Ekstraklasa championship in his debut season. Genkov was club's top goalscorer in the second part of the season with six goals in the league.

In the following season, he was a starter in all six matches in the Wisła's ultimately unsuccessful UEFA Champions League qualifying campaign. On 9 September, Genkov picked up an injury at beginning of the league match against Lech Poznań. He returned to play on 15 October, scoring the winning goal in a 3–1 home win over Jagiellonia Białystok. Genkov also netted the winning goal in a 2–1 victory over FC Twente, in the last UEFA Europa League group stage match, which lead his team to qualify for the round of 32.

On 16 February 2012, he scored a late equaliser in the first leg tie against Standard Liège. Wisła Kraków played with ten-men for most of the match after Michał Czekaj was sent off in the 27th minute. He scored his first hat-trick for Wisła Kraków on 14 April, scoring all three of his team's goals in a 3–2 home win over ŁKS Łódź in the Ekstraklasa. Genkov was a top goalscorer of 2011–12 Polish Cup with four goals from three games.

=== Levski Sofia ===
Genkov signed with Levski Sofia on 19 June 2013 on a three-year deal. He was not registered for the 1st round of the UEFA Europa League games against Kazakh club Irtysh Pavlodar, which his team lost by an aggregate score of 0–2. Genkov made his official debut for Levski Sofia on 21 July 2013, in the 1–2 away loss against Botev Plovdiv in an A PFG match. He scored his first goal for the team from Sofia a week later in the 1–2 home defeat inflicted by Lokomotiv Plovdiv.

=== Okzhetpes ===
On 14 February 2017, Genkov signed for Okzhetpes of the Kazakhstan Premier League.

=== OFK Kostinbrod ===
After three years without a club, Genkov signed with Bulgarian fourth division club OFK Kostinbrod in March 2020. As of September 2021, Genkov was still playing for Kostinbrod.

== International career ==
Receiving his first call-up for an official match in March 2005, he was capped nine times for Bulgaria national under-21 football team, scoring three goals. Genkov received his first senior international cap for Bulgaria on 17 August 2005 in a friendly match against Turkey, which they won 3–1, coming on as a substitute for Dimitar Berbatov after one hour of play.

== Outside football ==
Genkov has participated in charity campaigns during his spell with Wisla. He also represents Bulgarian company TRYMAX.

== Career statistics ==
=== Club ===
As of match played 28 May 2017

Appearances and goals by club, season and competition
Club	Season	League			National Cup		League Cup		Continental		Other		Total	
Club	Season	Division	Apps	Goals	Apps	Goals	Apps	Goals	Apps	Goals	Apps	Goals	Apps	Goals
Lokomotiv Mezdra	2001–02	V AFG	12	1	0	0	–		–		–		12	1
Lokomotiv Mezdra	2002–03	V AFG	30	14	3	1	–		–		–		33	15
Lokomotiv Mezdra	2003–04	V AFG	30	24	0	0	–		–		–		30	24
Lokomotiv Mezdra	Total		72	39	3	1	-	-	-	-	-	-	75	40
Lokomotiv Sofia	2004–05	A PFG	30	12	1	1	–		–		–		31	13
Lokomotiv Sofia	2005–06	A PFG	27	11	1	0	–		–		–		28	11
Lokomotiv Sofia	2006–07	A PFG	29	27	2	1	–		6	4	–		37	32
Lokomotiv Sofia	Total		86	50	4	2	-	-	6	4	-	-	96	56
Dynamo Moscow	2007	Premier Liga	9	0	1	1	–		–		–		10	1
Dynamo Moscow	2008	Premier Liga	23	4	2	0	–		–		–		25	4
Dynamo Moscow	2009	Premier Liga	5	0	2	0	–		0	0	–		7	0
Dynamo Moscow	Total		37	4	5	1	-	-	0	0	-	-	42	5
Lokomotiv Sofia	2009–10	A PFG	13	4	0	0	–		–		–		13	4
Lokomotiv Sofia	2010–11	A PFG	13	11	1	0	–		–		–		14	11
Lokomotiv Sofia	Total		26	15	1	0	-	-	-	-	-	-	27	15
Wisła Kraków	2010–11	Ekstraklasa	13	6	1	1	–		–		–		14	7
Wisła Kraków	2011–12	Ekstraklasa	21	7	3	4	–		10	2	–		34	13
Wisła Kraków	2012–13	Ekstraklasa	21	4	3	4	–		–		–		24	8
Wisła Kraków	Total		55	17	7	9	-	-	10	2	-	-	72	28
Levski Sofia	2013–14	A PFG	27	5	3	2	–		–		–		30	7
Denizlispor	2014–15	TFF First League	25	11	0	0	–		–		–		25	11
Denizlispor	2015–16	TFF First League	25	5	0	0	–		–		–		25	5
Denizlispor	Total		50	16	0	0	-	-	-	-	-	-	50	16
Lokomotiv GO	2016–17	A PFG	9	0	0	0	–		–		–		9	0
Okzhetpes	2017	Kazakhstan Premier League	12	1	1	0	–		–		–		13	1
Career total			374	147	24	15	-	-	16	6	-	-	414	168

=== International ===
Statistics accurate as of match played 6 September 2011

Bulgaria national team
Year	Apps	Goals
2005	4	0
2006	2	0
2007	4	0
2008	1	0
2009	0	0
2010	0	0
2011	6	0
Total	17	0

== Honours ==
Wisła Kraków

- Ekstraklasa: 2010–11

Individual

- A PFG top goalscorer: 2006–07
- Polish Cup top goalscorer: 2011–12
