= Luka Tiodorović =

Montenegrin footballer

Personal information
- Full name: Luka Tiodorović
- Date of birth: 21 January 1986 (age 40)
- Place of birth: Titograd, SFR Yugoslavia
- Height: 1.88 m (6 ft 2 in)
- Position: Midfielder

Youth career
- 2000–2004: Budućnost Podgorica

Senior career*
Years	Team	Apps	(Gls)
2004–2006	Kom	20	(1)
2006–2007	Dečić	22	(1)
2007–2010	Mogren	65	(1)
2010–2011	Budućnost Podgorica	6	(0)
2011–2012	Mladost Podgorica	11	(0)
2011–2012	Polonia Bytom	2	(0)
2012	Smederevo	7	(0)
2013	Luftetari	11	(0)
2013	Mornar	1	(0)
2013–2014	Lushnja	20	(0)
2014–2015	Radnički Kragujevac	18	(1)
2015–2016	Lovćen	25	(0)
2016–2017	Jedinstvo Bijelo Polje	16	(0)
2017	OFK Odžaci	11	(1)
2017–2019	Mladost Lješkopolje		

International career
2007–2008	Montenegro U21	5	(0)
- * Club domestic league appearances and goals

Luka Tiodorović (Cyrillic: Лука Тиодоровић; born 21 January 1986) is a Montenegrin former professional footballer who played as a midfielder.

== Club career ==
Born in Titograd, SR Montenegro, Tiodorović played in the youth teams of Red Star Belgrade and FK Budućnost Podgorica. He made his senior debut in 2005 playing with FK Kom in the Second League of Serbia and Montenegro. He would then play with FK Dečić in the inaugural season of the Montenegrin First League. In summer 2007 he moved to FK Mogren where he will play for the following three seasons. He will play with Mogren in their 2009–10 UEFA Champions League campaign. In summer 2010 he moved back to Budućnost but will spend the second half of the season playing with FK Mladost Podgorica.

In summer 2011 he moved abroad and joined Polish club Polonia Bytom. After making only 2 appearances in the I Liga during the 2011–12 season, he left Poland.

In August 2012, after a successful trial period, he signed with Serbian top-flight side FK Smederevo.

== National team ==
He was member of the Montenegrin under-21 team.

== Honours ==
Mogren

- Montenegrin First League: 2008–09
- Montenegrin Cup: 2008
