= Dragan Paljić =

German footballer

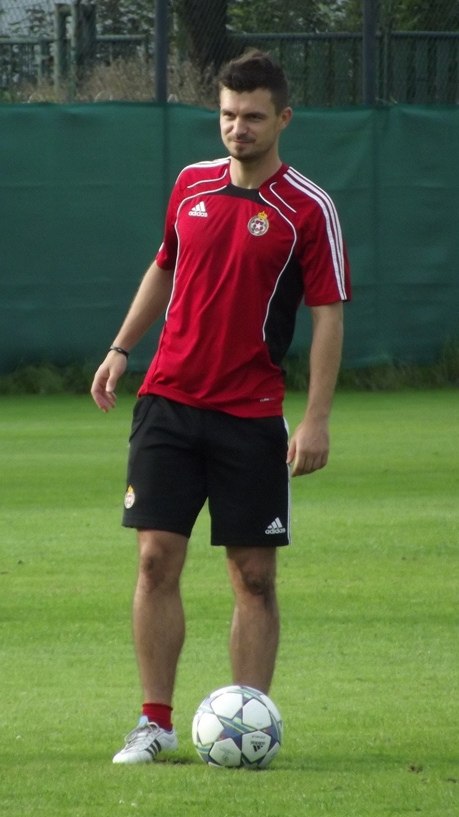
- Paljić in 2011

Personal information
- Date of birth: 8 April 1983 (age 43)
- Place of birth: Starnberg, West Germany
- Height: 1.74 m (5 ft 9 in)
- Position: Left winger

Youth career
- 1991–1994: FT Starnberg 09
- 1994–2000: TSV Blaichach
- 2000–2002: 1860 Munich

Senior career*
Years	Team	Apps	(Gls)
2002–2003	1860 Munich II	10	(0)
2003–2004	FV Olympia Laupheim		(20)
2004–2008	1899 Hoffenheim	96	(13)
2008–2010	1. FC Kaiserslautern	46	(3)
2010–2012	Wisła Kraków	52	(1)
2012–2015	Heracles Almelo	20	(0)
2015	Perth Glory	12	(0)
2015–2016	1. CfR Pforzheim	31	(3)
Total		267+	(40)
- * Club domestic league appearances and goals

Dragan Paljić (born 8 April 1983) is a German-Serbian football coach and former player.

== Career ==
Paljić was born in Starnberg, West Germany. He was a member of the 1899 Hoffenheim squad that won promotion to the 2. Bundesliga and 2010 the promotion with 1. FC Kaiserslautern to the Bundesliga. He also played for 1. FC Kaiserslautern and Wisła Kraków. In July 2012, he signed with Heracles Almelo in the Dutch Eredivisie. On 13 January 2014, signed for Australian A-League club Perth Glory FC.

== Personal life ==
His family is from Doboj, Bosnia and Herzegovina. He is of Bosnian Serb descent.

== Career statistics ==
As of 8 May 2012

Appearances and goals by club, season and competition
Club	Season	League			Cups		Europe		Total	
Club	Season	Division	Apps	Goals	Apps	Goals	Apps	Goals	Apps	Goals
1860 Munich II	2001–02	Oberliga	1	0	–		–		1	0
1860 Munich II	2002–03	Oberliga	9	0	–		–		9	0
1860 Munich II	Total		10	0	–		–		10	0
FV Olympia Laupheim	2003–04	Verbandsliga		20	–		–			20
1899 Hoffenheim	2004–05	Regionalliga	23	5	0	0	–		23	5
1899 Hoffenheim	2005–06	Regionalliga	23	1	0	0	–		23	1
1899 Hoffenheim	2006–07	Regionalliga	31	6	–		–		31	6
1899 Hoffenheim	2007–08	2. Bundesliga	19	1	2	1	–		21	2
1899 Hoffenheim	2008–09	Bundesliga	0	0	1	0	–		1	0
1899 Hoffenheim	Total		96	13	3	1	–		99	14
1. FC Kaiserslautern	2008–09	2. Bundesliga	29	2	–		–		29	2
1. FC Kaiserslautern	2009–10	2. Bundesliga	17	1	2	0	–		19	1
1. FC Kaiserslautern	Total		46	3	2	0	–		48	3
Wisła Kraków	2010–11	Ekstraklasa	28	1	4	0	2	0	34	1
Wisła Kraków	2011–12	Ekstraklasa	24	0	5	0	7	0	36	0
Wisła Kraków	Total		52	1	9	0	9	0	70	1
Career total			204+	37	14	1	9	0	227+	38

== Honours ==
1. FC Kaiserslautern

- 2. Bundesliga: 2009–10

Wisła Kraków

- Ekstraklasa: 2010–11

Individual

- Verbandsliga top scorer: 2003–04
