= Paweł Sasin =

Polish footballer (born 1983)

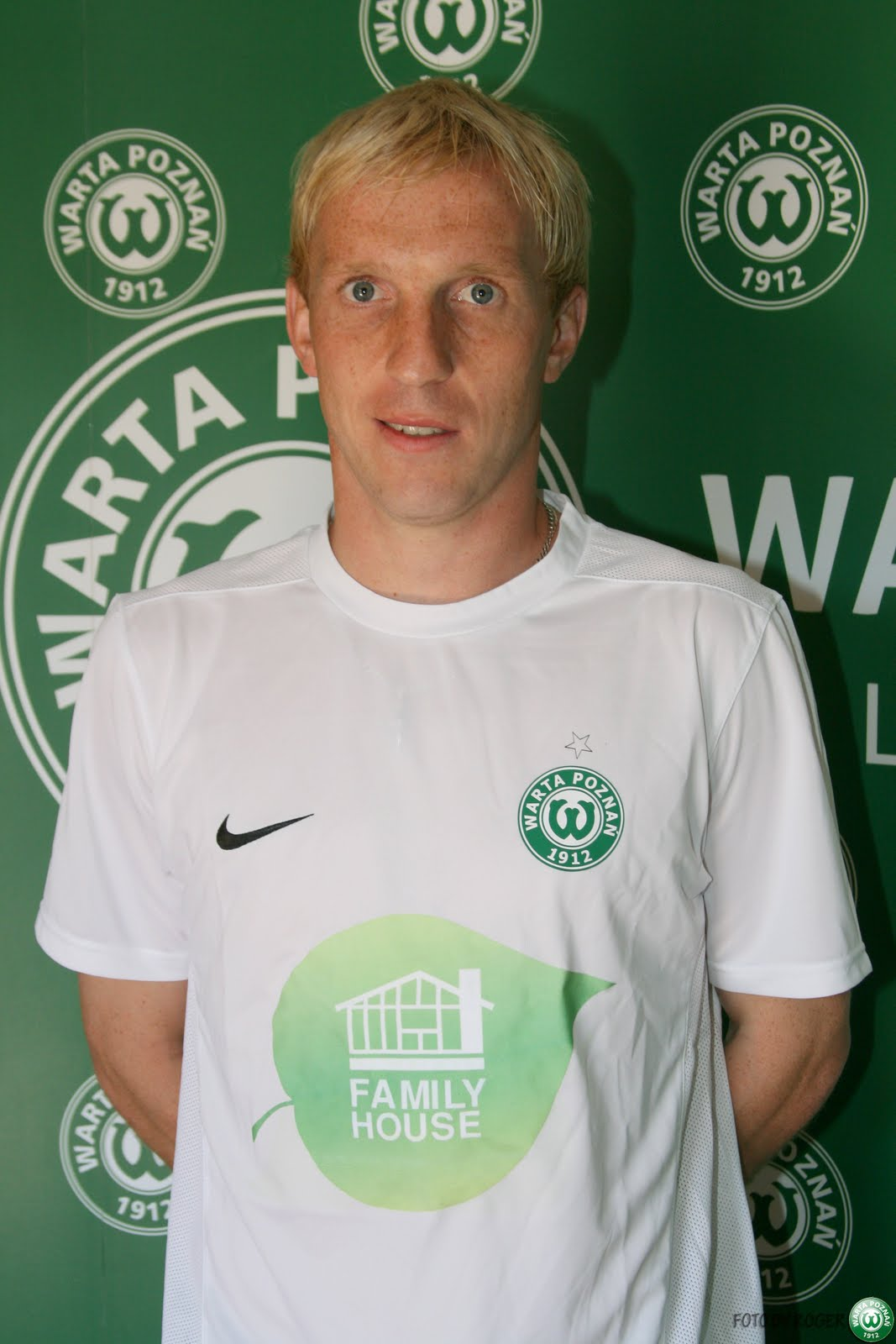
- Sasin with Warta Poznań in 2011

Personal information
- Full name: Paweł Sasin
- Date of birth: 2 October 1983 (age 43)
- Place of birth: Radom, Poland
- Height: 1.77 m (5 ft 9 1/2 in)
- Positions: Full-back; defensive midfielder

Team information
- Current team: Polonia Środa Śląska
- Number: 8

Youth career
- Beniaminek Radom

Senior career*
Years	Team	Apps	(Gls)
2000–2001	SMS Wrocław		
2001–2004	Śląsk Wrocław	2	(0)
2004–2006	Lech Poznań	39	(1)
2006–2009	Korona Kielce	69	(3)
2009–2010	Cracovia	41	(2)
2011	Górnik Łęczna	15	(0)
2011–2012	Warta Poznań	17	(1)
2012–2013	ŁKS Łódź	25	(1)
2013	Dolcan Ząbki	11	(0)
2013–2021	Górnik Łęczna	173	(4)
2021–2022	Arka Gdynia	8	(0)
2022–2023	Polonia Nysa	33	(0)
2023–2024	Ślęza Wrocław	17	(0)
2024–2026	Polonia Trzebnica	56	(6)
2026–	Polonia Środa Śląska	14	(1)

International career
2003–2005	Poland U21	4	(0)
- * Club domestic league appearances and goals as of 18:12, 30 June 2026 (UTC)

Paweł Sasin (born 2 October 1983) is a Polish professional footballer who plays as a full-back or a defensive midfielder for IV liga Lower Silesia club Polonia Środa Śląska.

== Club career ==
In February 2011, he was released from Cracovia.

After leaving Cracovia, he joined Górnik Łęczna.

In July 2011, he signed a contract with Warta Poznań and moved to ŁKS Łódź on 10 January 2012.

== International career ==
Sasin is a former member of the Poland U21 team.

== Honours ==
Górnik Łęczna

- II liga: 2019–20
