= Lukáš Killar =

Czech footballer (born 1981)

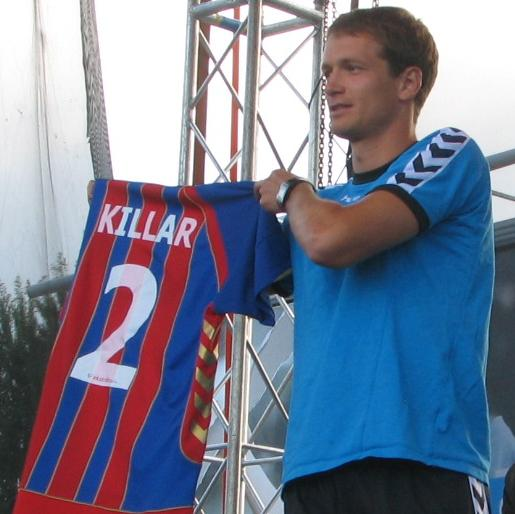

Personal information
- Date of birth: 5 August 1981 (age 45)
- Place of birth: Opočno, Czechoslovakia
- Height: 1.91 m (6 ft 3 in)
- Position: Defender

Youth career
- TJ Dobruška
- Náchod
- Pardubice

Senior career*
Years	Team	Apps	(Gls)
1998–2000	Atlantic Lázně Bohdaneč	23	(0)
2000–2001	AS Pardubice	9	(0)
2001–2002	Slovan Liberec	6	(0)
2002	Trenčín	8	(0)
2003–2009	Kladno	136	(4)
2009–2011	Polonia Bytom	65	(0)
Total		247	(4)
- * Club domestic league appearances and goals

Lukáš Killar (born 5 August 1981) is a Czech former professional footballer who played as a defender.

He retired in January 2012 due to heart-related issues, and immediately became the sporting director of his last club Polonia Bytom. He held the role until January the following year.

== Honours ==
Slovan Liberec

- Czech First League: 2001–02
