= Piotr Kuklis =

Polish footballer

Personal information
- Full name: Piotr Kuklis
- Date of birth: 14 January 1986 (age 40)
- Place of birth: Łódź, Poland
- Height: 1.76 m (5 ft 9 in)
- Position: Midfielder

Team information
- Current team: Widzew Łódź U19 (assistant)

Youth career
- ŁKS Łódź

Senior career*
Years	Team	Apps	(Gls)
2004–2011	Widzew Łódź	88	(10)
2008–2009	→ GKS Bełchatów (loan)	18	(1)
2011–2013	Arka Gdynia	55	(13)
2013–2014	Zawisza Bydgoszcz	6	(0)
2014	Bytovia Bytów	4	(0)
2015	Sokół Aleksandrów Łódzki	1	(0)
2021	Czarni Smardzew	3	(1)
2024	Czarni Smardzew II	2	(5)
Total		177	(30)

International career
2007–2008	Poland U21	7	(0)
2007–2008	Poland	2	(0)
- * Club domestic league appearances and goals

Piotr Kuklis (born 14 January 1986) is a Polish former professional footballer who played as a midfielder. He is currently the assistant coach of Widzew Łódź's under-19 team.

== Career ==
Kuklis was released from Widzew Łódź on 22 June 2011.

In July 2011, he joined Arka Gdynia on a one-year contract.

== Honours ==
Widzew Łódź

- I liga: 2009–10

Zawisza Bydgoszcz

- Polish Cup: 2013–14
