= Marek Szyndrowski =

Polish footballer

Personal information
- Full name: Marek Szyndrowski
- Date of birth: 30 October 1980 (age 46)
- Place of birth: Świętochłowice, Poland
- Height: 1.84 m (6 ft 1/2 in)
- Position: Defender

Senior career*
Years	Team	Apps	(Gls)
1995–2004	Ruch Chorzów	60	(1)
2004–2009	Korona Kielce	79	(0)
2007–2008	→ Arka Gdynia (loan)	16	(0)
2009–2010	GKS Bełchatów	8	(0)
2010–2016	Ruch Chorzów	109	(1)
2013–2016	Ruch Chorzów II	15	(2)
2016–2017	Polonia Bytom	32	(1)
2018–2019	Warta Kamieńskie Młyny	18	(2)
2022	Warta Kamieńskie Młyny	8	(0)
Total		345	(7)
- * Club domestic league appearances and goals

Marek Szyndrowski (born 30 October 1980) is a Polish former professional footballer who played as a defender.

== Career ==
=== Club ===
Previously he played for Arka Gdynia, Ruch Chorzów and Korona Kielce.

In late 2010, he signed for Ruch Chorzów.

== Honours ==
Korona Kielce

- II liga: 2004–05

Warta Kamieńskie Młyny

- Klasa A Lubliniec: 2021–22
