= OSiR Stadium (Gorzów Wielkopolski) =

Football stadium in Gorzów Wielkopolski, Poland

Coordinates: 52°43′54″N 15°12′27″E

Stadion OSiR (full name in Polish: Stadion Ośrodka Sportu i Rekreacji w Gorzowie Wielkopolskim) is a football stadium in Gorzów Wielkopolski, Poland.
