= MKS Kluczbork =

Polish football club

- Full name: Miejski Klub Sportowy w Kluczborku
- Founded: 30 June 2003; 23 years ago
- Ground: Municipal Stadium
- Capacity: 2,586
- Chairman: Waldemar Sosin
- Manager: Michał Honc (caretaker)
- League: III liga, group III
- 2025–26: III liga, group III, 7th of 18
- Website: www.mkskluczbork.pl
Traditional colours

MKS Kluczbork is a football club based in Kluczbork, Opole Voivodeship, Poland. They compete in group III of the III liga, the fourth tier of the national football league system.

== History ==
The club was founded in 2003 as the merger of three local clubs: KKS Kluczbork (itself a result of merger in 1945 between ZKK Kluczbork and Cresovia Kluczbork), LKS Kuniów and the local inter-school sports organisation. The club itself, although founded recently, relates to the town's very rich footballing history, inheriting the stadium and facilities of the previous most successful Kluczbork club Metal Kluczbork.

In the 2008–09 season, MKS won the Western group of the third division, and were consequently promoted to the I liga for the 2009–10 season.

They reached the 1/8th of the Polish Cup in the 2011–12 season, eventually losing 1–0 to Ruch Zdzieszowice

== Honours ==
- II liga
  - Champions: 2008–09 (West), 2014–15
- Polish Cup
  - Round of 16: 2011–12

== Players ==
=== Current squad ===
As of 12 September 2025

Note: Flags indicate national team as defined under FIFA eligibility rules; some limited exceptions apply. Players may hold more than one non-FIFA nationality.

No.	Pos.	Nation	Player
1	GK	POL	Kacper Jureczko (on loan from Raków Częstochowa II)
3	DF	POL	Jakub Trojanowski
4	DF	POL	Michał Maj
5	MF	POL	Rafał Niziołek
6	DF	POL	Bartosz Chłód
7	MF	POL	Krzysztof Napora
8	MF	POL	Patryk Tuszyński
9	FW	POL	Dawid Czapliński
10	MF	BRA	Neison
11	MF	POL	Maksymilian Nowak
14	MF	POL	Adrian Pacholak
16	MF	POL	Krzysztof Gasztych

No.	Pos.	Nation	Player
17	FW	POL	Konrad Janicki
18	DF	POL	Jakub Knejski (on loan from Gwarek Zabrze)
20	FW	POL	Marcel Mioduszewski
21	MF	POL	Kamil Nykiel
23	MF	POL	Dominik Lewandowski (captain)
69	MF	POL	Kamil Muller
71	MF	POL	Marko Zawada
73	FW	POL	Michał Biskup
77	MF	POL	Łukasz Plichta (on loan from Widzew Łódź II)
94	DF	POL	Michał Sitek
97	MF	POL	Mateusz Kulig
99	GK	POL	Marcin Kaczmarczyk

=== Out on loan ===
Note: Flags indicate national team as defined under FIFA eligibility rules; some limited exceptions apply. Players may hold more than one non-FIFA nationality.

No.	Pos.	Nation	Player
—	GK	POL	Patryk Moś (at Start Namysłów until 30 June 2026)
—	GK	POL	Błażej Sapielak (at LZS Starowice until 30 June 2026)
