= Michał Płotka =

Polish footballer

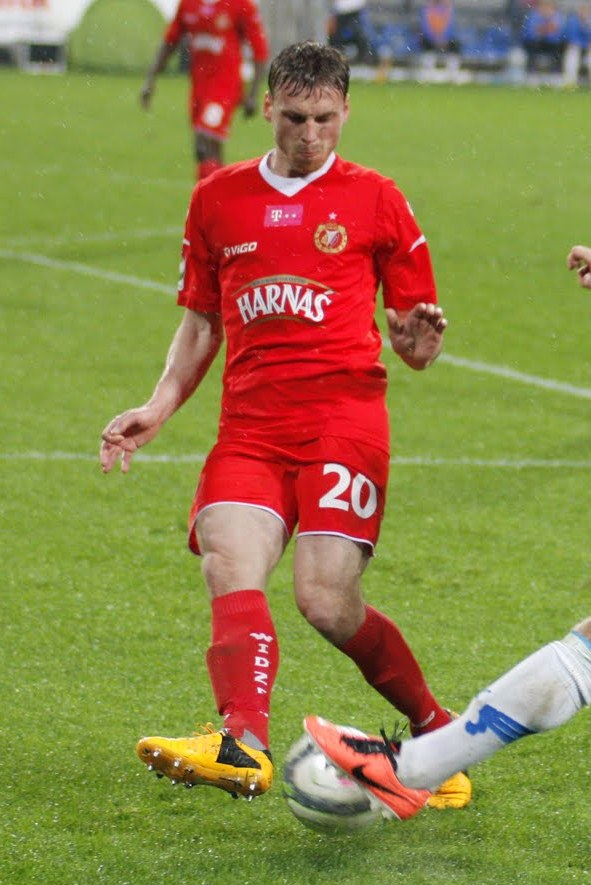
- Płotka with Widzew Łódź in 2013

Personal information
- Full name: Michał Płotka
- Date of birth: 11 June 1988 (age 38)
- Place of birth: Puck, Poland
- Height: 1.81 m (5 ft 11 in)
- Position: Defender

Youth career
- Korona Żelistrzewo

Senior career*
Years	Team	Apps	(Gls)
2005–2006	Start Mrzezino		
2006–2012	Arka Gdynia	52	(0)
2007	→ Cartusia Kartuzy (loan)		
2007–2008	→ Motor Lublin (loan)	17	(1)
2012	Warta Poznań	0	(0)
2013–2014	Widzew Łódź	10	(0)
2013–2014	Widzew Łódź II	7	(0)
2014	Znicz Pruszków	8	(0)

International career
2008–2010	Poland U21	5	(0)
- * Club domestic league appearances and goals

Michał Płotka (born 11 June 1988) is a Polish former professional footballer who played as a defender. He last played for Znicz Pruszków, and has previously played in Ekstraklasa for Arka Gdynia and Widzew Łódź.
