= Tomasz Księżyc =

Polish footballer (born 1974)

Personal information
- Full name: Tomasz Księżyc
- Date of birth: 20 April 1974 (age 52)
- Place of birth: Kraków, Poland
- Height: 1.84 m (6 ft 1/2 in)
- Position: Defender

Senior career*
Years	Team	Apps	(Gls)
1995–1999	Wawel Kraków		
1999–2001	Cracovia		
2001–2002	Hutnik Kraków		
2002–2004	Szczakowianka Jaworzno	53	(5)
2005	Podbeskidzie Bielsko-Biała	14	(2)
2005–2007	Górnik Wieliczka		
2007–2010	Kolejarz Stróże	105	(12)
2011–2013	Puszcza Niepołomice	75	(10)
2013	Górnik Wieliczka		
2014–2021	JKS Zelków		
2021–2023	Sportowiec Modlniczka	12	(0)
- * Club domestic league appearances and goals

Tomasz Księżyc (born 20 April 1974) is a Polish former professional footballer who played as a defender.

== Career ==
In December 2010, he joined Puszcza Niepołomice on one and a half contract.

== Honours ==
JKS Zelków

- Klasa B Kraków II: 2014–15
