= White Eagle Municipal Stadium =

Football stadium in Legnica, Poland

Coordinates: 51.2036°N 16.1698°E

- Stadion Miejski im. Orła Białego
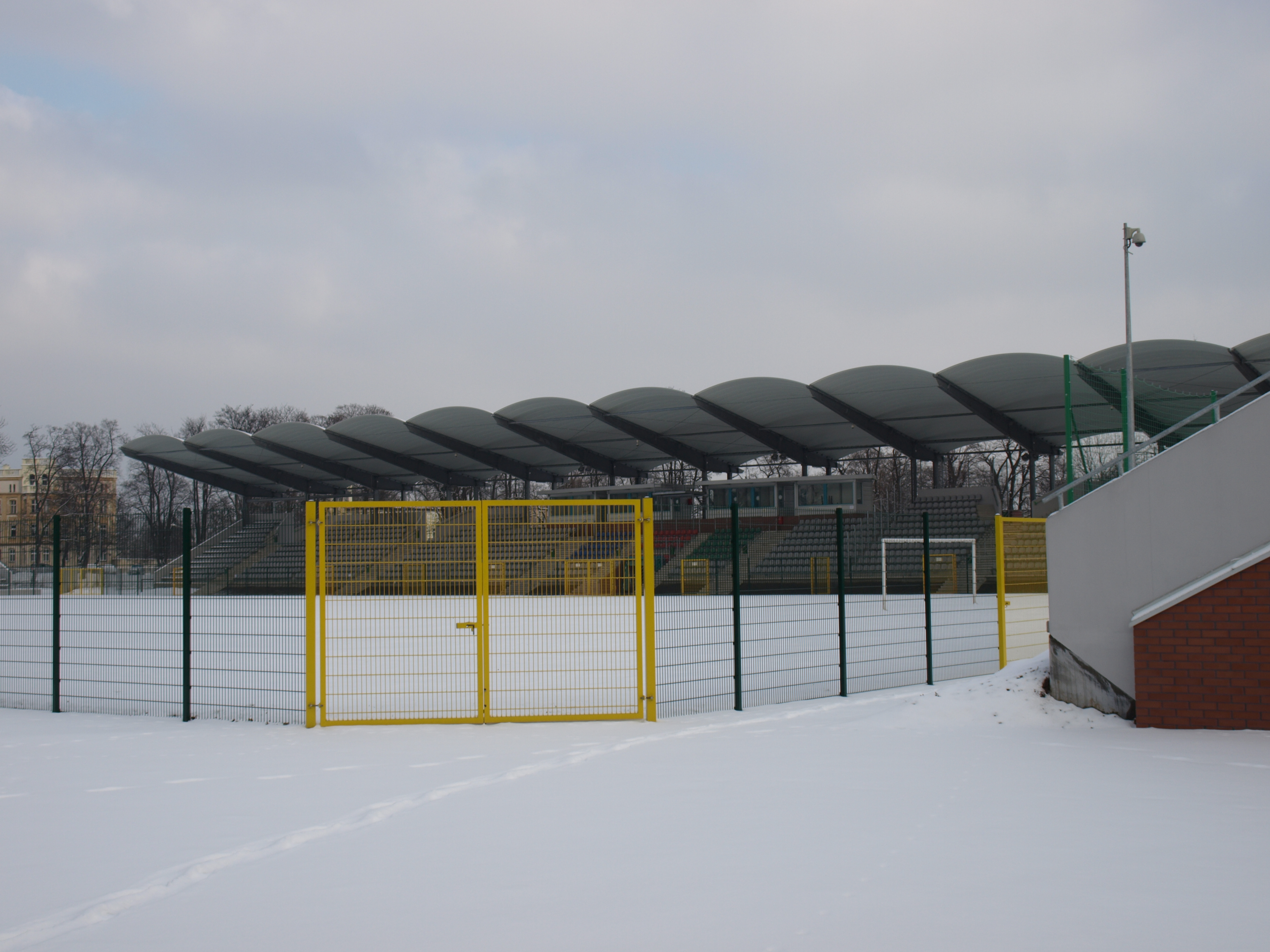
- Main stand of the stadium (covered)
- Interactive map of White Eagle Municipal Stadium
- Full name: White Eagle Municipal Stadium in Legnica
- Location: Al. Orła Białego 1; 59–220 Legnica, Poland
- Owner: City of Legnica
- Capacity: 6,156
- Surface: Grass
- Record attendance: 6,946
- Field size: 105 m × 68 m (115 yd × 74 yd)

Construction
- Renovated: 2005–2009
- Cost: 35 million PLN

Tenant
- Miedź Legnica

The White Eagle Municipal Stadium (Polish: Stadion Miejski im. Orła Białego) is a football stadium in Legnica, Poland, located in the City Park along White Eagle Avenue. The owner of the facility is the city, and the stadium is managed by the Legnica Sports and Recreation Center.

The stadium is primarily used by the football team Miedź Legnica. It was renovated between 2005 and 2009. The stadium can accommodate 6,156 spectators. In further stages of modernization, plans included the construction of lighting (four masts), filling the stadium's corners to close the structure, installing a heated pitch, fully roofing the stadium, and implementing an electronic stadium management system (electronic entry cards, etc.). The project was scheduled for completion between 2009 and 2011. In 2011, training fields were completed near the stadium (including two football fields, each 105 m x 68 m, one with an artificial surface, an athletics track, lighting, and stands for around 200 spectators).

== Events held at the stadium ==
- From 1999 to 2005 and in 2010, the stadium hosted annual regional conventions of Jehovah's Witnesses.
- From September 9–12, 2010, the stadium hosted the 74th Polish Senior Archery Championships.
- From August 22–28, 2011, the stadium (and adjacent fields) hosted the Junior Archery World Championships.
