= Przemysław Kocot =

Polish footballer

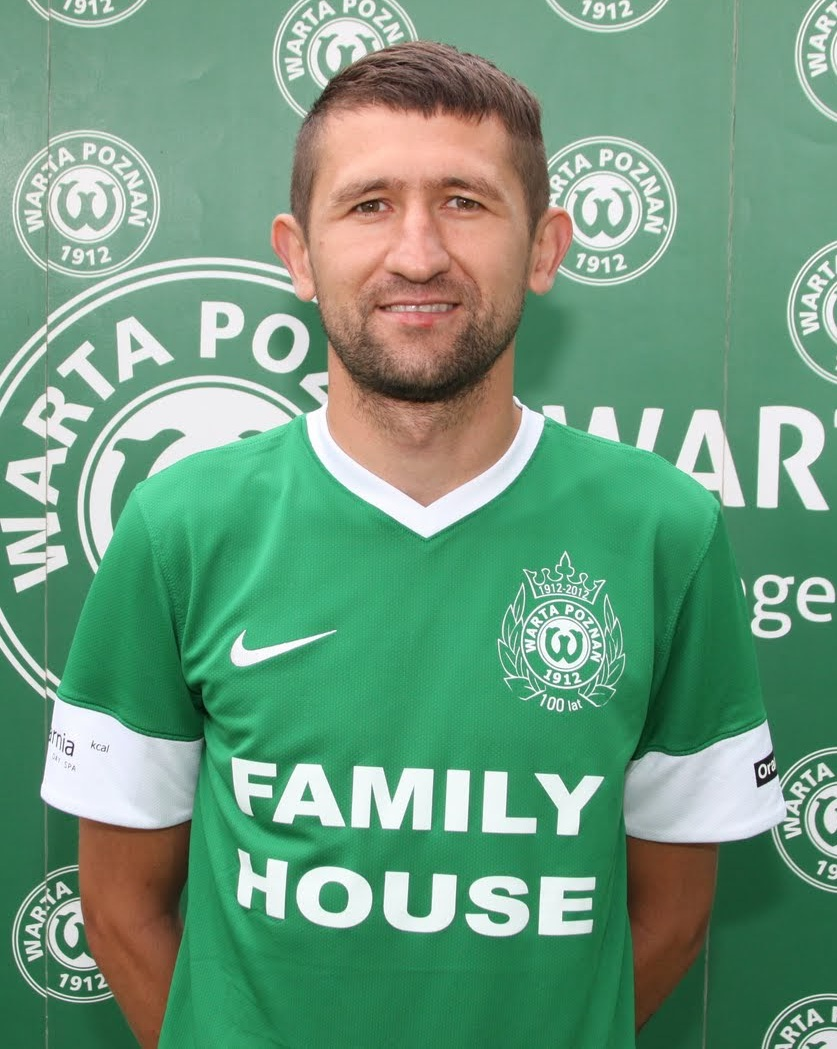
- Kocot with Warta Poznań in 2013

Personal information
- Full name: Przemysław Kocot
- Date of birth: 31 January 1986 (age 40)
- Place of birth: Jelenia Góra, Poland
- Height: 1.78 m (5 ft 10 in)
- Position: Defensive midfielder

Team information
- Current team: GKS Raciborowice
- Number: 31

Youth career
- Karkonosze Jelenia Góra

Senior career*
Years	Team	Apps	(Gls)
2004	Zagłębie Lubin	1	(0)
2004–2007	Górnik Polkowice	74	(1)
2007–2011	Zagłębie Lubin	56	(1)
2011–2012	KS Polkowice	30	(1)
2013	Nielba Wągrowiec	11	(0)
2013–2014	Warta Poznań	26	(0)
2014	Karkonosze Jelenia Góra	12	(0)
2015	Flota Świnoujście	7	(0)
2015	Karkonosze Jelenia Góra	5	(0)
2015	NFV Gelb-Weiß Görlitz 09	15	(1)
2015–2018	ŁKS Łódź	58	(1)
2018–2019	Znicz Pruszków	24	(0)
2019–2025	Karkonosze Jelenia Góra	137	(7)
2025–	GKS Raciborowice	35	(6)
- * Club domestic league appearances and goals as of 08:28, 10 September 2026 (UTC)

Przemysław Kocot (born 31 January 1986) is a Polish professional footballer who plays as a defensive midfielder for IV liga Lower Silesia club GKS Raciborowice.

== Career ==
Kocot was released from Zagłębie Lubin on 1 June 2011.

In July 2011, he joined KS Polkowice.

Ahead of the 2019–20 season, Kocot returned to Karkonosze Jelenia Góra.

== Honours ==
Karkonosze Jelenia Góra

- IV liga Lower Silesia West: 2020–21, 2022–23
- Polish Cup (Jelenia Góra regionals): 2020–21, 2022–23, 2023–24, 2024–25

GKS Raciborowice

- Regional league Jelenia Góra: 2025–26
- Polish Cup (Jelenia Góra regionals): 2025–26
