= OSiR Stadium (Olsztyn) =

Football stadium in Olsztyn, Poland

Coordinates: 53°46′22.89″N 20°30′33.88″E

Stadion OSiR w Olsztynie
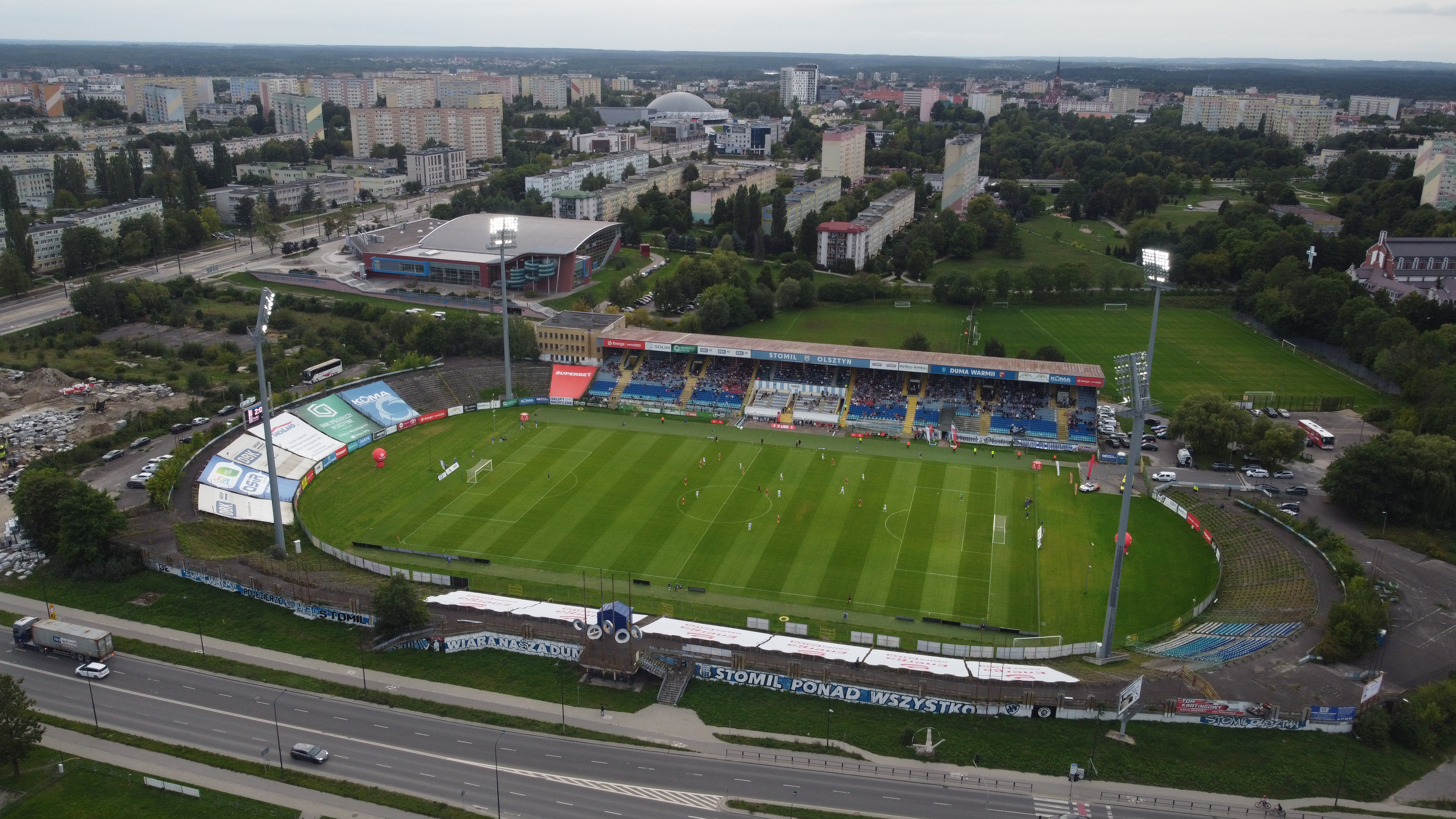
- Interactive map of Stadion OSiR w Olsztynie
- Location: Olsztyn, Poland
- Operator: OSiR Olsztyn
- Capacity: 16,800 (3,500 seating)
- Surface: Grass; 105 x 67 m

Construction
- Opened: 1978

Tenant
- Stomil Olsztyn

Stadion OSiR w Olsztynie (OSiR Stadium in Olsztyn) is a multi-use stadium in Olsztyn, Poland. It is currently used mostly for football matches and is the home ground of OKS 1945 Olsztyn. The stadium has a capacity of 16,800 people.

== History ==
The stadium was built in the 1970s. In 1994–2002, Stomil Olsztyn played its games in Polish First League there. On 24 June 1989 the final of the Polish Cup between Jagiellonia Białystok and Legia Warszawa (2:5) was played on the stadium. The match was watched by 20,000 fans. On 24 September 1997 venue also hosted friendly football match between Poland and Lithuania (2:0).

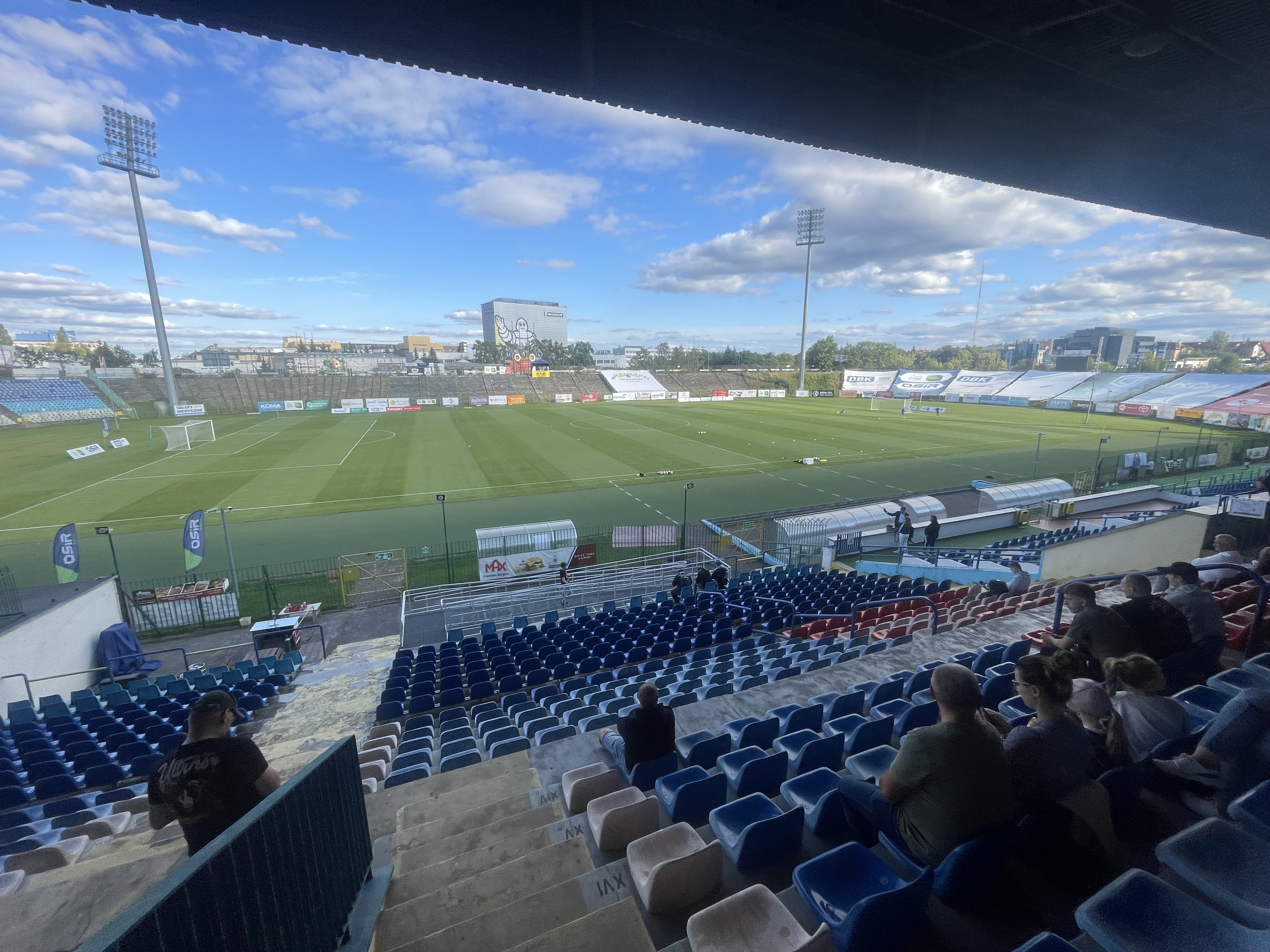
The stadium in 2025
