= Suche Stawy Stadium =

Multi-purpose stadium in Kraków, Poland

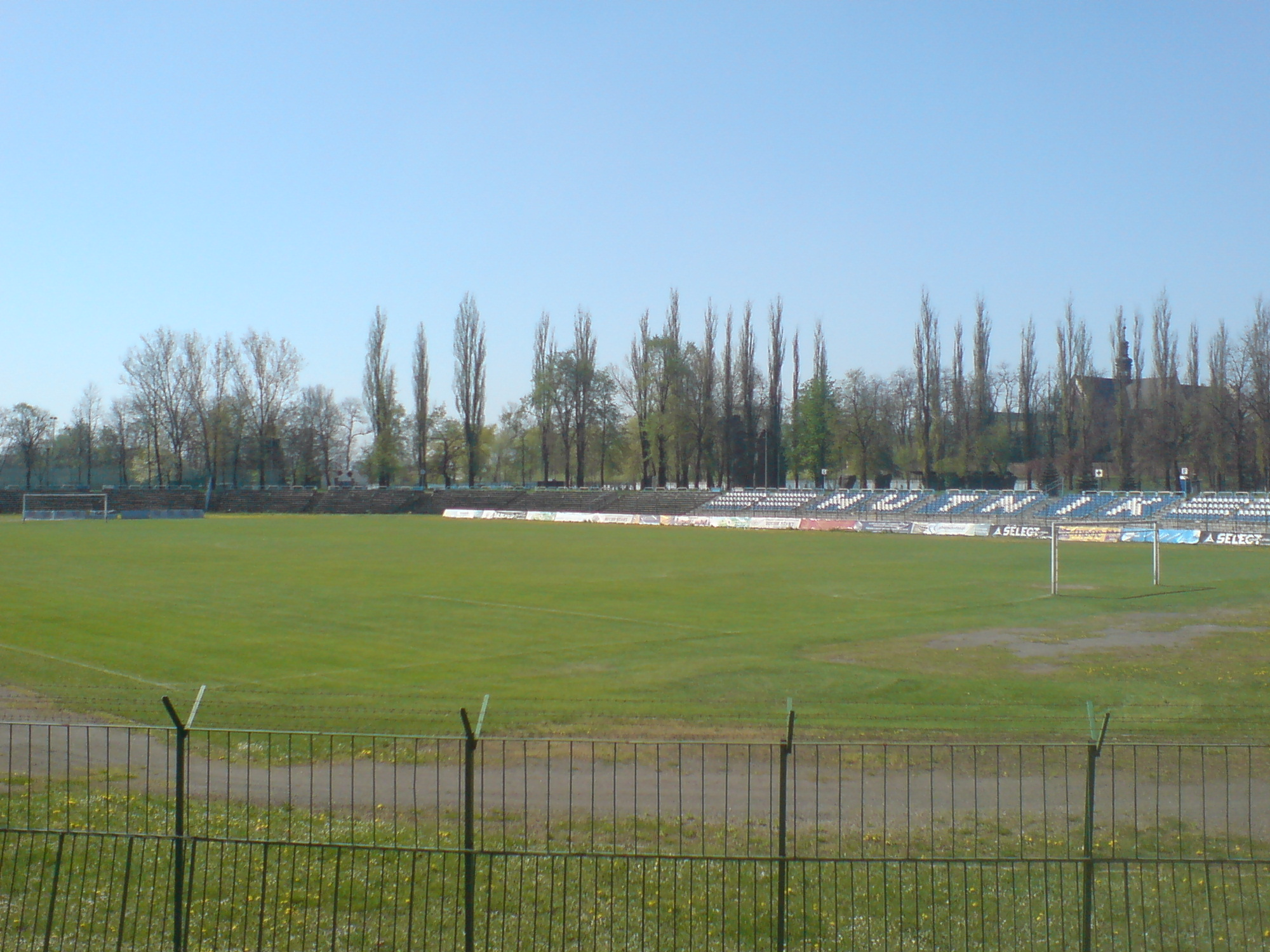
- Interactive map of Suche Stawy Stadium
- Location: Kraków, Poland
- Coordinates: 50°3′58″N 20°3′26″E
- Capacity: 6,500

Construction
- Opened: 1950

Tenant
- Hutnik Kraków

The Suche Stawy Stadium (Polish: Stadion Suche Stawy, Polish pronunciation: [ˈstadʲɔn ˈsuxɛ ˈstavɨ]) is a multi-purpose stadium in Kraków, Poland. It is mainly used mostly for football matches and hosts the home matches of Hutnik Kraków. The stadium has a capacity of 6,500 spectators. It was used by England as a training base for the Euro 2012.
