= Daniel Brud =

Polish footballer

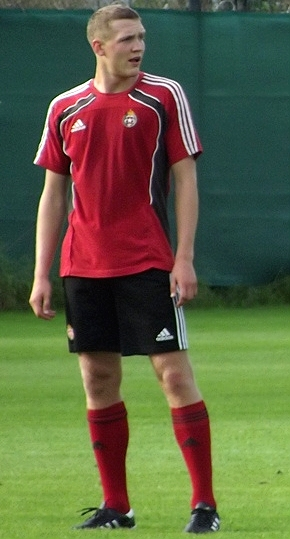

Personal information
- Full name: Daniel Brud
- Date of birth: 20 May 1989 (age 37)
- Place of birth: Kraków, Poland
- Height: 1.82 m (5 ft 11 1/2 in)
- Position: Midfielder

Youth career
- Wisła Kraków
- 2007–2008: SC Freiburg
- 2008–2011: Wisła Kraków

Senior career*
Years	Team	Apps	(Gls)
2011–2013	Wisła Kraków	8	(0)
2012	→ ŁKS Łódź (loan)	14	(1)
2013–2014	Okocimski Brzesko	17	(1)
2014–2015	Flota Świnoujście	27	(2)
2015–2016	Jutrzenka Giebułtów	37	(4)
Total		103	(8)

International career
2005	Poland U17	8	(0)
- * Club domestic league appearances and goals

Daniel Brud (born 20 May 1989) is a Polish former professional footballer who played as a midfielder.

== Career ==
=== Club ===
He made his debut for Wisła Kraków in Ekstraklasa on 15 April 2011 in a match against GKS Bełchatów.

== Career statistics ==
Appearances and goals by club, season and competition
Club	Season	League	League		National cup		Europe		Total	
Club	Season	League	Apps	Goals	Apps	Goals	Apps	Goals	Apps	Goals
Wisła Kraków	2010–11	Ekstraklasa	2	0	0	0	0	0	2	0
Wisła Kraków	2011–12	Ekstraklasa	5	0	4	0	4	0	13	0
Wisła Kraków	2012–13	Ekstraklasa	1	0	1	0	—		2	0
Wisła Kraków	Total		8	0	5	0	4	0	17	0
ŁKS Łódź (loan)	2012–13	I liga	14	1	1	0	—		15	1
Okocimski KS Brzesko	2013–14	I liga	17	1	0	0	—		17	1
Flota Świnoujście	2014–15	I liga	27	2	1	2	—		28	4
Jutrzenka Giebułtów	2015–16	IV liga Les. Poland West	27	3	—		—		27	3
Jutrzenka Giebułtów	2016–17	IV liga Les. Poland West	10	1	—		—		10	1
Jutrzenka Giebułtów	Total		37	4	—		—		37	4
Career total			103	8	8	2	4	0	115	10

== Honours ==
SC Freiburg

- Under 19 Fußball-Bundesliga: 2007–08

Wisła Kraków

- Ekstraklasa: 2010–11
