= Polonia Słubice =

Polish football club

- Full name: Miejski Klub Sportowy Polonia Słubice
- Nicknames: Duma Pogranicza (The Pride of the Frontier); Koguty (Roosters); Duma Ziemi Lubuskiej (The Pride of the Lubusz Land)
- Founded: 25 August 1945; 81 years ago (as Kotwica Słubice)
- Ground: SOSiR Stadium
- Capacity: 7,000
- Chairman: Krzysztof Ławrynowicz
- Manager: Michał Gościniak
- League: IV liga Lubusz
- 2025–26: IV liga Lubusz, 3th of 18
- Website: MKS Polonia Słubice on Facebook
Home colours	Away colours

Polonia Słubice is a Polish football club based in Słubice. They currently compete in IV liga Lubusz, the fifth tier of the Polish league system.

== Notable players ==
The goalkeeper Łukasz Fabiański played in the Polonia youth team, making his debut for them against their German counterparts FC Victoria 91. As a 16 year old, Marcin Warcholak signed for the club.
