= Marcin Dziewulski =

Polish footballer

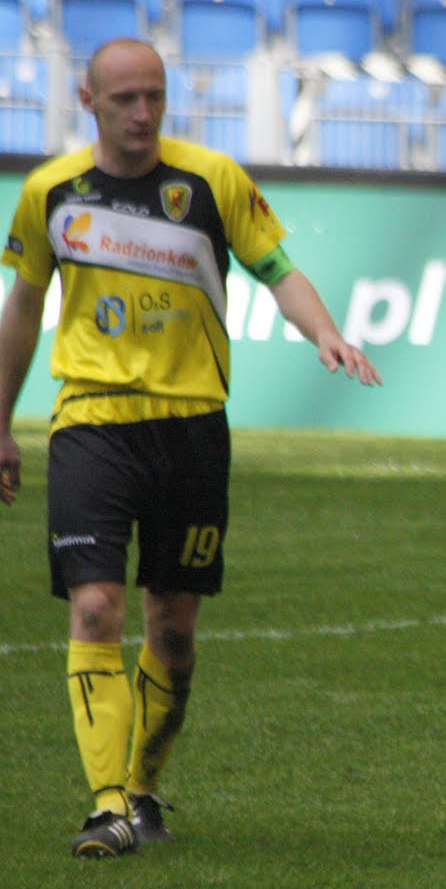
- Dziewulski with Ruch Radzionków in 2012

Personal information
- Full name: Marcin Dziewulski
- Date of birth: 24 October 1982 (age 44)
- Place of birth: Tarnowskie Góry, Poland
- Height: 1.82 m (5 ft 11 1/2 in)
- Position: Midfielder

Youth career
- 1996–1997: Tarnowiczanka Stare Tarnowice
- 1997–2001: Gwarek Zabrze

Senior career*
Years	Team	Apps	(Gls)
2001–2002	Urania Ruda Śląska		
2003	Górnik Zabrze II		
2003–2005	Stal Kraśnik		
2006	Avia Świdnik		
2007–2008	Frenaros		
2008–2010	Ruch Radzionków	64	(6)
2011–2012	Polonia Bytom	19	(0)
2012	Ruch Radzionków	14	(0)
2012	LZS Piotrówka	14	(1)
2013–2014	Nadwiślan Góra		
2014–2018	Ruch Radzionków		
2019	Drama Zbrosławice	14	(0)

Managerial career
- 2016–2018: Ruch Radzionków (player-assistant)
- 2020: Drama Zbrosławice
- 2020–2022: Ruch Radzionków
- * Club domestic league appearances and goals

Marcin Dziewulski (born 24 October 1982) is a Polish football manager and former professional player, most recently in charge of Ruch Radzionków.

== Career ==
In February 2011, he was released from Ruch Radzionków. After tests, he signed a contract with Polonia Bytom.

== Honours ==
Ruch Radzionków

- II liga West: 2009–10
- III liga Opole–Silesia: 2008–09
- IV liga Silesia I: 2014–15, 2017–18

Drama Zbrosławice

- Regional league Katowice IV: 2018–19
