= Sławomir Szary =

Polish footballer

Personal information
- Full name: Sławomir Szary
- Date of birth: 31 July 1979 (age 47)
- Place of birth: Wodzisław Śląski, Poland
- Height: 1.84 m (6 ft 1/2 in)
- Position: Defender

Senior career*
Years	Team	Apps	(Gls)
1996–1999	Naprzód Rydułtowy		
1999–2000	Górnik Jastrzębie Zdrój	11	(0)
2000–2003	Włókniarz Kietrz	91	(6)
2004–2009	Odra Wodzisław	124	(2)
2009–2011	Piast Gliwice	51	(2)
2011–2012	Olimpia Elbląg	17	(0)
2012–2014	Energetyk ROW Rybnik	75	(1)
2014–2015	LKS Bełk		
2015–2020	Pniówek Pawłowice	118	(3)
2020–2021	Unia Książenice	27	(1)
2022–2023	TKKF Sokół Chwałęcice	5	(0)

Managerial career
- 2023: Pniówek Pawłowice
- * Club domestic league appearances and goals

Sławomir Szary (born 31 July 1979) is a Polish professional football manager and former player who played as a defender. He most recently served as the assistant coach and sporting director of Pniówek Pawłowice.

== Career ==
He was released from Piast Gliwice on 28 June 2011.

In July 2011, joined Olimpia Elbląg on a one-year contract.

== Managerial statistics ==
As of match played 17 June 2023

Managerial record by team and tenure
Team	From	To	Record							
Team	From	To	G	W	D	L	GF	GA	GD	Win %
Pniówek Pawłowice	7 February 2023	30 June 2023	17	6	6	5	32	29	+3	35.29
Total			17	6	6	5	32	29	+3	35.29

== Honours ==
Energetyk ROW Rybnik

- II liga West: 2012–13

LKS Bełk

- IV liga Silesia II: 2014–15

Pniówek Pawłowice

- Polish Cup (Tychy regionals): 2018–19
