= 2025–26 US Triestina Calcio 1918 season =

Italian football club season 2025-26

US Triestina Calcio 1918
2025-26 season
- Manager: Geppino Marino
- Stadium: Stadio Nereo Rocco
- Serie C Group A: 11th
- Coppa Italia Serie C: First round
- Top goalscorer: League: Eetu Vertainen (2); All: Eetu Vertainen (4)

The 2025–26 season is the 108th in the history of Unione Sportiva Triestina Calcio and the club's fifth consecutive season in Serie C. In addition to the domestic league of Italian football, Triestina competes in the Coppa Italia Serie C. The season began on 16 August 2025.

On 29 May 2025, Triestina was penalized with a nine-point deduction for the upcoming season by the National Federal Court’s disciplinary body, following the club’s failure to pay its fees by the 16 April deadline. On 19 June, the Federal Court of Appeal partially upheld the club’s appeal, reducing the penalty to seven points. On 16 September, the National Federal Court imposed an additional 13-point deduction after a 31 July referral, due to the club’s failure to pay wages to its players and staff.

== Squad ==
=== Transfers In ===
Pos.	Player	Transferred from	Fee	Date	Source
DF	(Italy) Andrea Moretti	(Italy) Pontedera	Loan return	30 June 2025	
MF	(Haiti) Christopher Attys	(Italy) Lecco	Loan return	30 June 2025	
MF	(Morocco) Sofian Kiyine	(Italy) Foggia	Loan return	30 June 2025	
MF	(Netherlands) Rayan El Azrak	(China) Shaanxi Union	Loan return	30 June 2025	
MF	(Poland) Olaf Kozłowski	(Switzerland) FC Schaffhausen	Loan return	30 June 2025	
MF	(Curaçao) Jaron Vicario	(Italy) Messina	Loan return	30 June 2025	
GK	(Croatia) Kristjan Matošević	(Italy) Juve Stabia	Loan return	30 June 2025	
DF	(Slovenia) Mladen Mutavčić	(Italy) Brian Lignano	Loan return	30 June 2025	
DF	(Netherlands) Ruggero Mannes	(Slovenia) Gorica	Loan return	30 June 2025	
MF	(Italy) Alessandro Patalano	(Italy) Ischia	Loan return	30 June 2025	
DF	(Brazil) Rodolfo Moisés	(Italy) Chions	Loan return	30 June 2025	
MF	(Slovenia) Aaron Kačinari	(Slovenia) Rudar Velenje	Loan return	30 June 2025	
DF	(Italy) Marco Olivieri	(Italy) Cittadella	Undisclosed	1 July 2025	
MF	(Tunisia) Alessandro Louati	(Italy) Juve Stabia	Loan	1 September 2025	
GK	(Italy) Filippo Neri	(Italy) Venezia	Loan	1 September 2025	
DF	(Italy) Francesco D'Amore	(Italy) Juve Stabia	Loan	1 September 2025	
DF	(Italy) Tommaso Silvestri	(Italy) Catania	Undisclosed	1 September 2025	
DF	(Italy) Alessandro Silvestro	(Italy) Foggia	Free	1 September 2025	
FW	(Italy) Alessandro Faggioli	(Italy) Audace Cerignola	Free	4 September 2025	

=== Transfers Out ===
Pos.	Player	Transferred to	Fee	Date	Source
DF	(Italy) Tommaso Silvestri	(Italy) Catania	Loan return	30 June 2025	
DF	(Italy) Damiano Cancellieri	(Italy) Avellino	Loan return	30 June 2025	
DF	(France) Côme Bianay Balcot	(Italy) Torino	Loan return	30 June 2025	
DF	(Italy) Marco Olivieri	(Italy) Cittadella	Loan return	30 June 2025	
DF	(Netherlands) Ruggero Mannes			1 July 2025	
DF	(Netherlands) Teun Bijleveld	(Netherlands) Almere City	Undisclosed	1 July 2025	
MF	(Netherlands) Rayan El Azrak	(China) Shaanxi Union	Free	5 July 2025	
MF	(Italy) Alessandro Patalano	(Italy) Treviso	Free	15 July 2025	
MF	(Poland) Olaf Kozłowski	(Poland) Pogoń Siedlce	Free	16 July 2025	
GK	(Netherlands) Kelle Roos	(England) Notts County	Free	22 July 2025	
DF	(Italy) Nicholas Rizzo	(Italy) Ascoli	Free	28 July 2025	
DF	(Italy) Alessandro Bianconi	(Italy) Ravenna	Free	8 August 2025	
MF	(Italy) Luca Fiordilino	(Italy) Inter U23	Free	8 August 2025	
FW	(Italy) Marco Olivieri	(Italy) Cesena	Released	19 August 2025	
DF	(Italy) Domenico Frare		Released	19 August 2025	
DF	(Slovenia) Daniel Pavlev	(Slovenia) ND Primorje	Free	28 August 2025	
MF	(France) Omar Correia	(Italy) Juve Stabia	Undisclosed	1 September 2025	
MF	(Slovenia) Aaron Kačinari			1 September 2025	
MF	(Portugal) Braima Sambú	(Portugal) Mafra	Undisclosed	1 September 2025	

== Competitions ==
=== Overall record ===
Competition	First match	Last match	Starting round	Final position	Record							
Competition	First match	Last match	Starting round	Final position	Pld	W	D	L	GF	GA	GD	Win %
Serie C	23 August 2025	26 April 2026	Matchday 1		5	2	2	1	6	5	+1	40.00
Coppa Italia Serie C	16 August 2025		First round	First round	1	0	0	1	1	2	−1	0.00
Total					6	2	2	2	7	7	+0	33.33

Last updated: 21 September 2025
Source: Competitions

=== Serie C ===
Group A

==== Results summary ====
Overall								Home						Away					
Pld	W	D	L	GF	GA	GD	Pts	W	D	L	GF	GA	GD	W	D	L	GF	GA	GD
5	2	2	1	6	5	+1	-12	1	2	0	4	3	+1	1	0	1	2	2	0

Last updated: 21 September 2025.

==== Results by round ====
Round	1	2	3	4	5
Ground	A	H	H	A	H
Result	L	D	D	W	W
Position	17	17			

Updated to match(es) played on 21 September 2025. Source:
A = Away; H = Home; W = Win; D = Draw; L = Loss

==== Matches ====
23 August 2025 1	Alcione Milano	1–0	Triestina	Sesto San Giovanni
18:00 UTC+2	Pitou 13'			Stadium: Stadio Ernesto Breda; Referee: Davide Galiffi

30 August 2025 2	Triestina	1–1	Lecco	Trieste
18:00 UTC+2	D'Urso 70'		Ferrini 63'	Stadium: Stadio Nereo Rocco; Attendance: 549; Referee: Francesco Aloise

7 September 2025 3	Triestina	1–1	Ospitaletto	Trieste
15:00 UTC+2	Gündüz 40', (yellow card) 70' (yellow-red card) 75'		Gualandris 69'; Messaggi (penalty missed) 88'	Stadium: Stadio Nereo Rocco; Referee: Gabriele Totaro

13 September 2025 4	Lumezzane	1–2	Triestina	Lumezzane
15:00 UTC+2	Malotti 45' (pen.)		Moretti 66'; Vertainen 73'	Stadium: Stadio Tullio Saleri; Attendance: 336; Referee: Giacomo Rossini

21 September 2025 5	Triestina	2–1	Arzignano Valchiampo	Trieste
17:30 UTC+2				Stadium: Stadio Nereo Rocco; Referee: Deborah Bianchi

=== Coppa Italia Serie C ===
16 August 2025 First round	Arzignano Valchiampo	2–1	Triestina	Arzignano
18:00 UTC+2	Nanni 35'; Milillo 49'		Vertainen 19'	Stadium: Stadio Tommaso Dal Molin; Referee: Davide Cerea

== Statistics ==
=== Goalscorers ===
Rank.	Pos.	Player	Serie C	Coppa Italia Serie C	Total
1	FW	(Finland) Eetu Vertainen	3	1	4
2	MF	(Italy) Christian D'Urso	1	0	1
2	MF	(Turkey) Teoman Gündüz	1	0	1
2	DF	(Italy) Andrea Moretti	1	0	1
Total			6	1	7
