= Marek Kozioł =

Polish footballer

Personal information
- Date of birth: 1 June 1988 (age 38)
- Place of birth: Nowy Sącz, Poland
- Height: 1.99 m (6 ft 6 in)
- Position: Goalkeeper

Team information
- Current team: Stal Rzeszów
- Number: 88

Youth career
- –2006: Sandecja Nowy Sącz
- 2006–2007: Kolejarz Stróże

Senior career*
Years	Team	Apps	(Gls)
2007–2012	Sandecja Nowy Sącz	109	(0)
2012–2014	Zagłębie Lubin	2	(0)
2014–2016	Sandecja Nowy Sącz	31	(0)
2016–2017	Stal Mielec	15	(0)
2018–2019	Sandecja Nowy Sącz	31	(0)
2019–2021	Korona Kielce	49	(0)
2021–2023	ŁKS Łódź	30	(0)
2023	ŁKS Łódź II	4	(0)
2023–2025	Kotwica Kołobrzeg	46	(0)
2025–	Stal Rzeszów	21	(0)
- * Club domestic league appearances and goals as of 15:26, 4 April 2026 (UTC)

Marek Kozioł (born 1 June 1988) is a Polish professional footballer who plays as a goalkeeper for and captains I liga club Stal Rzeszów.

== Career statistics ==
As of match played 4 April 2026

Appearances and goals by club, season and competition
Club	Season	League			Polish Cup		Europe		Other		Total	
Club	Season	Division	Apps	Goals	Apps	Goals	Apps	Goals	Apps	Goals	Apps	Goals
Sandecja Nowy Sącz	2007–08	III liga, gr. IV	17	0	—		—		—		17	0
Sandecja Nowy Sącz	2008–09	II liga	30	0	—		—		—		30	0
Sandecja Nowy Sącz	2009–10	I liga	11	0	1	0	—		—		12	0
Sandecja Nowy Sącz	2010–11	I liga	32	0	0	0	—		—		32	0
Sandecja Nowy Sącz	2011–12	I liga	19	0	0	0	—		—		19	0
Sandecja Nowy Sącz	Total		109	0	1	0	—		—		110	0
Zagłębie Lubin	2011–12	Ekstraklasa	0	0	—		—		—		0	0
Zagłębie Lubin	2012–13	Ekstraklasa	2	0	1	0	—		—		3	0
Zagłębie Lubin	2013–14	Ekstraklasa	0	0	0	0	—		—		0	0
Zagłębie Lubin	Total		2	0	1	0	—		—		3	0
Sandecja Nowy Sącz	2013–14	I liga	2	0	3	0	—		—		5	0
Sandecja Nowy Sącz	2014–15	I liga	21	0	0	0	—		—		21	0
Sandecja Nowy Sącz	2015–16	I liga	8	0	1	0	—		—		9	0
Sandecja Nowy Sącz	Total		31	0	4	0	—		—		35	0
Stal Mielec	2015–16	II liga	3	0	—		—		—		3	0
Stal Mielec	2016–17	I liga	12	0	1	0	—		—		13	0
Stal Mielec	2017–18	I liga	0	0	0	0	—		—		0	0
Stal Mielec	Total		15	0	1	0	—		—		16	0
Sandecja Nowy Sącz	2018–19	I liga	31	0	0	0	—		—		31	0
Korona Kielce	2019–20	Ekstraklasa	29	0	0	0	—		—		29	0
Korona Kielce	2020–21	I liga	20	0	1	0	—		—		21	0
Korona Kielce	Total		49	0	1	0	—		—		50	0
ŁKS Łódź	2021–22	I liga	29	0	1	0	—		—		30	0
ŁKS Łódź	2022–23	I liga	1	0	0	0	—		—		1	0
ŁKS Łódź	Total		30	0	1	0	—		—		31	0
ŁKS Łódź II	2022–23	III liga, gr. III	4	0	—		—		—		4	0
Kotwica Kołobrzeg	2023–24	II liga	12	0	1	0	—		—		13	0
Kotwica Kołobrzeg	2024–25	I liga	34	0	0	0	—		—		34	0
Kotwica Kołobrzeg	Total		46	0	1	0	—		—		47	0
Stal Rzeszów	2025–26	I liga	21	0	1	0	—		—		22	0
Career total			338	0	11	0	0	0	0	0	344	0

== Honours ==
Stal Mielec

- II liga: 2015–16

ŁKS Łódź

- I liga: 2022–23

ŁKS Łódź II

- III liga, group I: 2022–23
