= 2014–15 I liga =

I liga
- Season: 2014–15
- Champions: Zagłębie Lubin
- Promoted: Zagłębie Lubin; TBB Nieciecza
- Relegated: GKS Tychy; Widzew Łódź; Flota Świnoujście
- Matches: 298
- Goals: 727 (2.44 per match)
- Top goalscorer: Grzegorz Goncerz (21 goals)
- Biggest home win: Bytovia 6–1 Sandecja; Miedź 6–1 Widzew; Chojnice 5–0 Pogoń; Miedź 5–0 Flota
- Biggest away win: Chrobry 0–6 Nieciecza
- Highest scoring: Tychy 2–7 Sandecja
- Highest attendance: 8,547; Zagłębie 1–1 Nieciecza (6 June 2015)
- Lowest attendance: 0 Zagłębie 2–0 Flota; Katowice 2–1 Flota; Widzew 0–0 Arka; Katowice 0–1 Wisła; Chrobry 0–0 Arka
- Total attendance: 516,214
- Average attendance: 1,732 ▲7.5%

The 2014–15 I liga is the 7th season of the Polish I liga under its current title, and the 67th season of the second highest division in the Polish football league system since its establishment in 1949. The league is operated by the Polish Football Association (PZPN). The league is contested by 18 teams. The regular season was played in a round-robin tournament. The season began on 1 August 2014, and concluded on 6 June 2015. After the 19th matchday the league will be on winter break between 1 December 2014 and 6 March 2015.

According to the competition rules, all clubs are required to field at least one youth player (born on 1994 or later and Polish or trained in Poland) in every game (except for the times when the only youth player on the roster is sent off or unable to continue playing).

== Changes from last season ==
The following teams have changed division since the 2013–14 season.

=== To I liga ===
Promoted from II liga East

- Wigry Suwałki
- Pogoń Siedlce

Promoted from II liga West

- Chrobry Głogów
- Bytovia Bytów

Relegated from Ekstraklasa

- Widzew Łódź
- Zagłębie Lubin

=== From I liga ===
Relegated to II liga

- Puszcza Niepołomice
- Energetyk ROW Rybnik
- Okocimski KS Brzesko

Dissolved

- Kolejarz Stróże

Promoted to Ekstraklasa

- GKS Bełchatów
- Górnik Łęczna

=== Notes ===
- Kolejarz Stróże did not receive the license for the 2014–15 season. As a result, the 15th-placed Stomil Olsztyn stayed in I liga for the next season.

== Team overview ==
Location of teams and stadiums in 2014–15 I liga

=== Stadia and locations ===
Team	Stadium	Capacity
Arka Gdynia	Stadion GOSiR	15,139
Bytovia Bytów	Stadion MOSiR	1,500
Chojniczanka Chojnice	Stadion Miejski Chojniczanka 1930	3,500
Chrobry Głogów	Stadion GOS	2,817
Dolcan Ząbki	Dolcan Arena	2,156
Flota Świnoujście	Stadion OSiR Wyspiarz	3,700
GKS Katowice	Stadion GKS Katowice	6,710
GKS Tychy	Stadion Miejski in Jaworzno	5,708
Miedź Legnica	Stadion im. Orła Białego	6,194
Olimpia Grudziądz	Stadion im. Bronisława Malinowskiego	5,000
Pogoń Siedlce	Stadion ROSRRiT w Siedlcach	2,901
Sandecja Nowy Sącz	Stadion im. Ojca Władysława Augustynka	5,000
Stomil Olsztyn	Stadion OSiR	16,800
Nieciecza	Stadion Bruk-Bet	2,093
Widzew Łódź	Stadion Widzewa	10,500
Wigry Suwałki	Stadion OSiR	3,060
Wisła Płock	Stadion im. Kazimierza Górskiego	12,800
Zagłębie Lubin	Stadion Zagłębia Lubin	16,068

== League table ==
Pos	Team	Pld	W	D	L	GF	GA	GD	Pts	Promotion or Relegation
1	Zagłębie Lubin (P)	34	23	8	3	57	20	+37	77	Promotion to Ekstraklasa
2	Termalica Bruk-Bet Nieciecza (P)	34	22	7	5	60	26	+34	73	Promotion to Ekstraklasa
3	Wisła Płock	34	20	9	5	50	25	+25	69	
4	Olimpia Grudziądz	34	15	8	11	46	37	+9	53	
5	Chojniczanka Chojnice	34	13	11	10	50	37	+13	50	
6	Dolcan Ząbki	34	12	14	8	43	39	+4	50	
7	Stomil Olsztyn	34	12	13	9	47	47	0	49	
8	GKS Katowice	34	14	6	14	44	41	+3	48	
9	Wigry Suwałki	34	12	11	11	36	37	−1	47	
10	Arka Gdynia	34	10	13	11	38	39	−1	43	
11	Chrobry Głogów	34	10	11	13	41	45	−4	41	
12	Miedź Legnica	34	11	7	16	44	45	−1	40	
13	Bytovia Bytów	34	10	10	14	39	45	−6	40	
14	Sandecja Nowy Sącz	34	9	8	17	40	55	−15	35	
15	Pogoń Siedlce (Q, O)	34	7	9	18	34	53	−19	30	Qualification to play-off
16	GKS Tychy (R)	34	6	10	18	31	56	−25	28	Relegation to II liga
17	Widzew Łódź (R)	34	4	10	20	25	58	−33	22	Relegation to II liga
18	Flota Świnoujście (Note: Flota withdrew from the competition after 28th round)	34	9	9	16	26	46	−20	36	

Source: 90minut.pl
Rules for classification: 1. points won; 2. points in head-to-head matches; 3. goal difference in hth matches; 4. goals scored in hth matches; 5. away goals in hth matches (only if two teams are tied); 6. total goal difference; 7. total goals scored; 8. fairplay ranking.
(O) Play-off winners; (P) Promoted; (Q) Qualified for the phase indicated; (R) Relegated

== Results ==
Home \ Away	ARK	BYT	CCH	GŁO	DOL	FLO	KAT	TYC	MLE	GRU	PSI	SNS	STO	NIE	WID	WIG	WPK	ZLU
Arka Gdynia		0–1	1–1	1–0	2–1	1–0	2–1	4–0	0–0	0–2	1–0	1–1	4–1	2–4	1–2	0–1	0–0	0–1
Bytovia Bytów	1–1		0–1	1–4	3–2	1–1	1–4	1–1	2–1	0–3	0–0	6–1	0–1	2–3	2–0	2–1	3–2	0–2
Chojniczanka Chojnice	1–1	2–0		1–1	1–1	3–0 (Note: Match cancelled due to Flota withdrawing from the competition.)	1–1	3–0	3–0	0–1	5–0	2–1	4–3	1–0	2–0	2–3	1–1	0–1
Chrobry Głogów	0–0	0–0	1–2		3–0	0–0	1–2	2–1	3–1	1–2	1–0	2–0	0–3	0–6	3–2	3–1	2–3	0–0
Dolcan Ząbki	0–0	0–0	0–3	0–2		1–1	2–0	2–1	2–0	2–2	3–1	2–2	2–2	3–1	2–1	0–0	0–0	2–2
Flota Świnoujście	2–0	0–3	2–1	2–2	0–1		0–1	1–0	3–0	1–0	1–1	2–0	0–3	0–2	2–0	1–0	0–3	1–2
GKS Katowice	0–0	0–0	1–1	1–1	2–3	2–1		2–0	1–0	3–1	3–2	3–0	2–1	1–2	2–1	0–1	0–1	0–5
GKS Tychy	1–2	3–2	3–3	1–1	1–0	1–1	0–3		2–1	0–1	4–1	2–7	0–1	1–0	1–0	1–1	0–1	0–1
Miedź Legnica	4–4	1–0	0–1	1–1	0–3	5–0	4–2	2–0		2–0	1–0	1–1	1–1	0–1	6–1	2–1	0–2	0–1
Olimpia Grudziądz	0–3	3–2	0–0	2–1	2–0	0–2	2–1	3–1	4–2		0–1	4–1	0–0	0–2	1–1	3–1	1–1	2–2
Pogoń Siedlce	4–4	0–0	4–1	0–2	0–1	3–0	1–3	1–1	1–0	1–1		1–2	1–2	1–4	3–1	0–0	0–2	1–2
Sandecja Nowy Sącz	3–1	0–1	1–1	2–1	1–1	1–0	1–0	1–1	0–4	1–1	0–1		1–2	1–3	2–0	2–0	0–1	0–1
Stomil Olsztyn	1–0	2–0	3–0	1–1	1–3	0–0	1–0	2–2	1–2	2–1	3–2	2–2		0–0	1–3	2–2	0–3	1–4
Nieciecza	1–1	1–0	1–0	3–0	1–1	1–1	1–0	2–1	2–1	1–0	2–0	3–0	3–0		2–1	2–0	0–2	1–1
Widzew Łódź	0–0	0–1	1–0	1–1	1–1	1–1	1–1	1–1	0–0	0–3	0–2	0–3 (Note: Match cancelled due to Widzew's license problem.)	0–0	2–1		2–2	0–1	0–3
Wigry Suwałki	1–0	1–1	2–1	1–0	0–1	3–0	2–0	0–0	0–0	0–1	2–0	2–1	1–1	1–1	2–1		1–2	2–1
Wisła Płock	0–1	2–1	1–1	3–1	1–1	2–0	0–2	1–0	2–0	1–0	1–1	2–1	2–2	1–2	2–1	1–1		0–1
Zagłębie Lubin	4–0	2–2	2–1	1–0	2–0	2–0	1–0	2–0	0–2	1–0	0–0	1–0	1–1	1–1	3–0 (Note: Match cancelled due to Widzew's financial problem.)	3–0	1–3	

Source: 90minut.pl
Legend: Blue = home team win; Yellow = draw; Red = away team win.

== I liga play-off ==
The 15th place team from the regular season will compete in a play-off with the 4th place team from II liga. Matches will be played on 14 and 20 June 2015. The winner will compete in the I liga.

14 June 2015
17:00

Pogoń Siedlce	1–1	Raków Częstochowa
Djousse 90+3'	Report	Reiman 59'

Stadion Miejski, Siedlce
Attendance: 2,624
Referee: Bartosz Frankowski (Toruń)

20 June 2015
17:00

Raków Częstochowa	2–2	Pogoń Siedlce
Reiman 51', 90+4'	Report	Calderón 39' (pen.); Djousse 84'

Miejski Stadion Piłkarski Raków, Częstochowa
Attendance: 2,500
Referee: Jarosław Przybył (Kluczbork)

3–3 on aggregate. Pogoń Siedlce won on away goals and stayed in I liga for next season.

== Season statistics ==
=== Top goalscorers ===
As of matches played 20 June 2015.

Rank	Player	Club	Goals
1	(Poland) Grzegorz Goncerz	GKS Katowice	21
2	(Poland) Emil Drozdowicz	Termalica Bruk-Bet Nieciecza	16
3	(Poland) Janusz Surdykowski	Bytovia Bytów	15
4	(Poland) Tomasz Mikołajczak	Chojniczanka Chojnice	14
5	(Poland) Krzysztof Janus	Wisła Płock	13
6	(Ukraine) Volodymyr Koval	Stomil Olsztyn	12
7	(Poland) Maciej Kowalczyk	GKS Tychy	11
8	(Poland) Marek Gancarczyk	Chojniczanka Chojnice	10
8	(Poland) Mateusz Szczepaniak	Miedź Legnica	10
10	(Poland) Aleksander Kwiek	Zagłębie Lubin	9
10	(Czech Republic) Michal Papadopulos	Zagłębie Lubin	9
10	(Poland) Damian Piotrowski	Chrobry Głogów	9
10	(Brazil) Marcus Vinicius	Arka Gdynia	9
10	(Poland) Arkadiusz Woźniak	Zagłębie Lubin	9
