= Oskar Repka =

Polish footballer (born 1999)

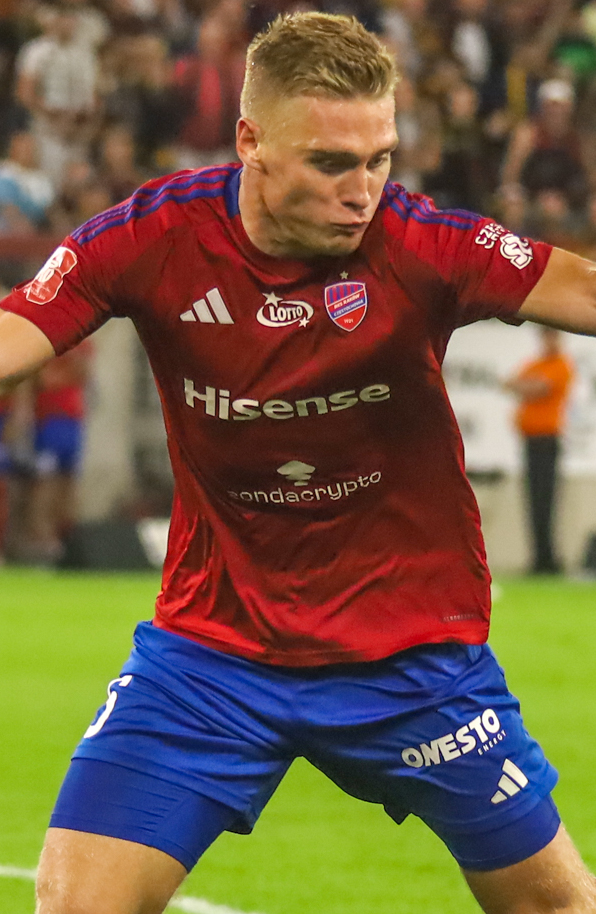
- Repka with Raków Częstochowa in 2025

Personal information
- Date of birth: 3 January 1999 (age 27)
- Place of birth: Bydgoszcz, Poland
- Height: 1.90 m (6 ft 3 in)
- Position: Midfielder

Team information
- Current team: Raków Częstochowa
- Number: 6

Youth career
- –2016: Zawisza Bydgoszcz
- 2016–2018: Karlsruher SC

Senior career*
Years	Team	Apps	(Gls)
2018–2019	Arka Gdynia	0	(0)
2018–2019	→ Chrobry Głogów (loan)	15	(2)
2019–2021	Pogoń Siedlce	48	(5)
2021–2025	GKS Katowice	107	(13)
2025–	Raków Częstochowa	46	(4)

International career
2016–2017	Poland U18	6	(0)
2017–2018	Poland U19	9	(1)
2018–2019	Poland U20	2	(0)
- * Club domestic league appearances and goals as of 18:41, 22 November 2026 (UTC)

Oskar Repka (born 3 January 1999) is a Polish professional footballer who plays as a midfielder for Ekstraklasa club Raków Częstochowa.

== Club career ==
=== Arka Gdynia ===
On 11 June 2018, Repka signed his first professional contract with Arka Gdynia.

==== Loan to Chrobry Głogów ====
At the beginning of the 2018–19 season, Repka went on loan to Chrobry Głogów. During the season, Repka made 15 appearances and scored two goals.

=== Pogoń Siedlce ===
On 23 July 2019, Repka signed a permanent contract with Pogoń Siedlce. In his first season at the club, Repka played 15 league games and scored two goals.

In his second season at the club, Repka made 24 appearances and scored thrice.

=== GKS Katowice ===
Repka joined GKS Katowice in July 2021 on a permanent deal.

On 26 May 2024, Repka won promotion to the Ekstraklasa with GKS after defeating his former club Arka Gdynia on the last matchday of the 2023–24 season.

=== Raków Częstochowa ===
On 4 July 2025, Repka transferred to fellow Ekstraklasa club Raków Częstochowa for a fee of €700,000, signing a five-year contract.

== International career ==
Repka started his international career with the U-18 team. In 2017, he was called up to the U-19 team, scoring once across nine appearances. In 2018, he was called up to the U-20 team, for whom he appeared twice.

Repka was called up to the senior Poland national team for the first time ahead of a friendly with Moldova and a 2026 FIFA World Cup qualifier match against Finland.

== Career statistics ==
As of match played 27 August 2026

Appearances and goals by club, season and competition
Club	Season	League			Polish Cup		Other		Total	
Club	Season	Division	Apps	Goals	Apps	Goals	Apps	Goals	Apps	Goals
Chrobry Głogów (loan)	2018–19	I liga	15	2	2	0	—		17	2
Pogoń Siedlce	2019–20	II liga	22	2	1	0	—		23	2
Pogoń Siedlce	2020–21	II liga	26	3	0	0	—		26	3
Pogoń Siedlce	Total		48	5	1	0	—		49	5
GKS Katowice	2021–22	I liga	19	1	2	0	—		21	1
GKS Katowice	2022–23	I liga	23	1	1	0	—		24	1
GKS Katowice	2023–24	I liga	32	3	1	0	—		33	3
GKS Katowice	2024–25	Ekstraklasa	33	8	2	0	—		35	8
GKS Katowice	Total		107	13	6	0	—		113	13
Raków Częstochowa	2025–26	Ekstraklasa	32	3	5	0	14 (Note: Appearances in UEFA Conference League)	2	51	5
Raków Częstochowa	2026–27	Ekstraklasa	3	0	0	0	6	0	9	0
Raków Częstochowa	Total		35	3	5	0	20	2	60	5
Career total			205	23	14	0	20	2	239	25
