= Łukasz Trepka =

Polish footballer (born 2006)

Personal information
- Full name: Łukasz Trepka
- Date of birth: 26 December 2006 (age 19)
- Position: Defender

Team information
- Current team: Pogoń Siedlce (on loan from GKS Katowice)
- Number: 29

Youth career
- –2019: Orbita Bukowno
- 2019–2024: GKS Katowice

Senior career*
Years	Team	Apps	(Gls)
2024–2025	GKS Katowice II	41	(3)
2024–	GKS Katowice	0	(0)
2026–	→ Pogoń Siedlce (loan)	4	(0)
- * Club domestic league appearances and goals as of 18 October 2026

Łukasz Trepka (born 26 December 2006) is a Polish professional footballer who plays as a defender for I liga club Pogoń Siedlce, on loan from Ekstraklasa club GKS Katowice. He can play as a right-back or a centre-back.

== Club career ==
=== GKS Katowice ===
Trepka began playing football with Orbita Bukowno before joining the academy of GKS Katowice. He subsequently progressed through the club's youth system and began training with the first team during the 2023–24 season.

On 15 March 2024, Trepka signed his first professional contract with GKS Katowice. The eighteen-month agreement included an option for an extension. He and goalkeeper Maksym Gerasymov were permanently added to the senior squad after taking part in preparations for the second half of the season.

Trepka was included in the first-team squad for the 2024–25 season but did not make an official appearance in either the Ekstraklasa or the Polish Cup. During the opening months of the following campaign, he was named in GKS' Ekstraklasa matchday squad on four occasions without making his senior debut.

On 1 October 2025, GKS announced that Trepka had signed a new contract running until 30 June 2028.

=== Loan to Pogoń Siedlce ===
On 24 July 2026, Trepka joined I liga club Pogoń Siedlce on loan until the end of the 2026–27 season. At the time of the transfer, he had not made an official first-team appearance for GKS Katowice. He was assigned squad number 29.

== Career statistics ==
As of match played 9 October 2025

Appearances and goals by club, season and competition
Club	Season	League			Polish Cup		Europe		Other		Total	
Club	Season	Division	Apps	Goals	Apps	Goals	Apps	Goals	Apps	Goals	Apps	Goals
GKS Katowice II	2023–24	Regional league	4	0	—		—		—		4	0
GKS Katowice II	2024–25	Regional league	26	3	—		—		—		26	3
GKS Katowice II	2025–26	V liga Silesia I	11	0	—		—		0	0	11	0
GKS Katowice II	Total		41	3	—		—		0	0	41	3
GKS Katowice	2023–24	I liga	0	0	—		—		—		0	0
GKS Katowice	2024–25	Ekstraklasa	0	0	0	0	—		—		0	0
GKS Katowice	2025–26	Ekstraklasa	0	0	0	0	—		—		0	0
GKS Katowice	Total		0	0	0	0	—		—		0	0
Pogoń Siedlce (loan)	2026–27	I liga	4	0	1	0	—		—		5	0
Career total			45	3	1	0	0	0	0	0	46	3

== Honours ==
GKS Katowice II

- Regional league Silesia IV: 2024–25
- Polish Cup (Katowice regionals): 2024–25
