= 2023–24 GKS Katowice season =

GKS Katowice
2023–24 season
- Chairman: Krzysztof Nowak
- Manager: Rafał Górak
- I liga: 2nd (promoted)
- Polish Cup: First round
- Top goalscorer: Sebastian Bergier (13)
- Highest home attendance: 7,455 (vs. Wisła Kraków, 18 May 2024; I Liga)
- Lowest home attendance: 2,142 (vs. Bruk-Bet Termalica Nieciecza, 8 October 2023; I liga)
- Average home league attendance: 3,869

The 2023–24 GKS Katowice season was the 61st in the history of the club. They were knocked out in the first round of the Polish Cup by Górnik Zabrze. Following a run of five wins in the last five games of the season, they finished 2nd in I liga on goal difference and were promoted to the top flight of Polish football after an absence of 19 years.

== I liga ==
Date	Opponents	H / A	Result F–A	Scorers	Attendance	League position
23 July 2023	Miedź Legnica	A	0–1			15th
31 July 2023	Chrobry Głogów	H	3-1	Błąd 20', Mak 68', 72'	2,932	8th
6 August 2023	Motor Lublin	A	1-1	Bergier 7'		9th
11 August 2023	Wisła Płock	H	4-1	Wasielewski 28', Jędrych 32', Rogala 47', Danek 78'	3,244	5th
21 August 2023	Znicz Pruszków	A	2-0	Mak 41', Błąd 58'		4th
26 August 2023	Resovia Rzeszów	H	3-0	Jędrych 9', Rogala 45', Marzec 89'	3,134	2nd
3 September 2023	Podbeskidzie Bielsko-Biała	A	1-1	Bergier 80'		5th
15 September 2023	Zagłębie Sosnowiec	H	0-1		5,087	6th
22 September 2023	Lechia Gdańsk	A	1-5	Bergier 13'		9th
30 September 2023	Odra Opole	A	0-1			10th
8 October 2023	Bruk-Bet Termalica Nieciecza	H	0-0		2,142	11th
22 October 2023	Górnik Łęczna	A	1-1	de Amo Pérez 84' (o.g.)		10th
27 October 2023	Polonia Warszawa	H	0-2		2,152	12th
5 November 2023	Stal Rzeszów	A	2-2	Bergier 25', Brzozowski 55'		12th
12 November 2023	GKS Tychy	H	1-0	Bergier 73'	3,835	11th
25 November 2023	Wisła Kraków	A	2-3	Bergier 57', Mak 63'		12th
2 December 2023	Arka Gdynia	H	1-1	Jędrych 73' (pen.)	2,360	12th
16 December 2023	Chrobry Głogów	A	4-1	Kozubal 15', 53', Repka 45+3', Jędrych 49'		13th
19 February 2024	Motor Lublin	H	2-0	Jędrych 42' (pen.), Bergier 84'	2,569	11th
24 February 2024	Wisła Płock	A	1-2	Jędrych 14' (pen.)		11th
27 February 2024	Miedź Legnica	H	2-0	Bergier 33', Jędrych 36'	5,045	11th
2 March 2024	Znicz Pruszków	H	3-1	Komor 27', Jędrych 37', Bergier 51'	2,903	10th
10 March 2024	Resovia Rzeszów	A	2-0	Bergier 50', Kozubal 76'		7th
17 March 2024	Podbeskidzie Bielsko-Biała	H	5-0	Jędrych 28' (pen.), Marzec 38', 45+2', Bergier 55', Błąd 62' (pen.)	4,556	6th
1 April 2024	Zagłębie Sosnowiec	A	4-0	Kozubal 14', Rogala 49', Marzec 55', Alemán 74'		3rd
7 April 2024	Lechia Gdańsk	H	1-0	Jędrych 90+3'	5,988	3rd
13 April 2024	Odra Opole	H	1-3	Jaroszek 56'	5,467	3rd
21 April 2024	Bruk-Bet Termalica Nieciecza	A	2-2	Janiszewski 8', Bergier 21'		3rd
25 April 2024	Górnik Łęczna	H	0-0		2,863	4th
28 April 2024	Polonia Warszawa	A	2-1	Jędrych 90+1' (pen.), Arak 90+4'		4th
4 May 2024	Stal Rzeszów	H	8-0	Kozubal 1', Bergier 12', Mak 14', 24', 27', Repka 63', Marzec 75', Arak 87'	4,046	3rd
10 May 2024	GKS Tychy	A	3-2	Jaroszek 18', Repka 61', Arak 90+2'		3rd
18 May 2024	Wisła Kraków	H	5-2	Jędrych 22', Błąd 33', Rogala 47', Carbó 63' (o.g.), Marzec 90+2'	7,455	3rd
26 May 2024	Arka Gdynia	A	1-0	Błąd 26'		2nd

== Polish Cup ==
Date	Round	Opponents	H / A	Result F–A	Scorers	Attendance
27 September 2023	First Round	Górnik Zabrze	H	0-4		5,794

== Squad statistics ==
No.	Pos.	Name	League		Polish Cup		Total		Discipline	
No.	Pos.	Name	Apps	Goals	Apps	Goals	Apps	Goals	Yellow card	Red card
1	GK	(Poland) Dawid Kudła	34	0	0	0	34	0	0	0
33	GK	(Poland) Patryk Szczuka	0	0	1	0	1	0	0	0
20	DF	(Poland) Adrian Danek	11	1	1	0	12	1	1	0
3	DF	(Poland) Grzegorz Janiszewski	10	1	0	0	10	1	3	1
13	DF	(Poland) Bartosz Jaroszek	20	2	0	0	20	2	5	0
4	DF	(Poland) Arkadiusz Jędrych	32	12	1	0	33	12	3	1
14	DF	(Poland) Aleksander Komor	30	1	1	0	31	1	1	0
2	DF	(Estonia) Märten Kuusk	12	0	0	0	12	0	2	1
16	DF	(Poland) Grzegorz Rogala	31	4	1	0	32	4	4	0
23	DF	(Poland) Marcin Wasielewski	32	1	1	0	33	1	4	0
8	MF	(Ecuador) Christian Alemán	15	1	1	0	16	1	0	0
21	MF	(Poland) Bartosz Baranowicz	19	0	1	0	20	0	2	0
11	MF	(Poland) Adrian Błąd	34	5	1	0	35	5	3	0
28	MF	(Poland) Alan Bród	3	0	0	0	3	0	1	0
29	MF	(Poland) Kacper Ćwielong	1	0	0	0	0	0	0	0
6	MF	(Poland) Antoni Kozubal	33	5	1	0	34	5	5	0
15	MF	(Poland) Szymon Krawczyk	3	0	0	0	3	0	1	0
10	MF	(Poland) Mateusz Mak	26	7	1	0	27	7	2	0
17	MF	(Poland) Mateusz Marzec	30	6	0	0	30	6	4	1
5	MF	(Poland) Oskar Repka	32	3	1	0	33	3	3	1
31	MF	(Japan) Shun Shibata	29	0	1	0	30	0	4	1
18	FW	(Poland) Jakub Arak	24	3	1	0	25	3	1	0
7	FW	(Poland) Sebastian Bergier	33	13	0	0	33	13	8	0
19	FW	(Poland) Kacper Pietrzyk	0	0	1	0	1	0	0	0
