= 1967–68 Ekstraklasa =

42nd season of top-tier football league in Poland

Liga
- Season: 1967–68
- Champions: Ruch Chorzów (10th title)
- Relegated: ŁKS Łódź; Gwardia Warsaw
- Top goalscorer: Włodzimierz Lubański (24 goals)

Statistics of Ekstraklasa for the 1967–68 season.

== Overview ==
It was contested by 14 teams, and Ruch Chorzów won the championship.

== League table ==
Pos	Team	Pld	W	D	L	GF	GA	GD	Pts	Qualification or relegation
1	Ruch Chorzów (C)	26	14	10	2	56	26	+30	38	Qualification to European Cup first round
2	Legia Warsaw	26	13	9	4	36	15	+21	35	Invitation for Inter-Cities Fairs Cup first round
3	Górnik Zabrze	26	13	7	6	52	27	+25	33	Qualification to Cup Winners' Cup first round
4	Polonia Bytom	26	9	8	9	31	31	0	26	
5	Zagłębie Sosnowiec	26	10	6	10	28	29	−1	26	
6	Pogoń Szczecin	26	10	6	10	23	28	−5	26	
7	Śląsk Wrocław	26	8	9	9	22	22	0	25	
8	GKS Katowice	26	8	9	9	29	34	−5	25	
9	Szombierki Bytom	26	10	3	13	37	40	−3	23	
10	Odra Opole	26	7	9	10	20	33	−13	23	
11	Stal Rzeszów	26	8	7	11	24	39	−15	23	
12	Wisła Kraków	26	5	11	10	18	24	−6	21	
13	ŁKS Łódź (R)	26	7	7	12	22	38	−16	21	Relegated to II liga
14	Gwardia Warsaw (R)	26	7	5	14	32	44	−12	19	Relegated to II liga

Source: 90minut.pl (in Polish)
(C) Champions; (R) Relegated

== Results ==
Home \ Away	KAT	GÓR	GWA	LEG	ŁKS	POG	BYT	OOP	RUC	SRZ	SZB	ŚLĄ	WIS	ZSO
GKS Katowice		2–1	2–0	1–1	1–0	0–0	0–2	2–1	2–2	0–0	2–1	2–0	0–1	1–3
Górnik Zabrze	3–1		4–1	2–1	3–1	1–1	2–0	6–0	4–1	7–0	1–1	0–0	4–2	1–2
Gwardia Warsaw	0–2	1–3		1–1	4–0	2–2	0–4	0–1	0–2	5–1	2–1	2–2	2–0	2–1
Legia Warsaw	2–0	0–0	0–0		7–0	2–1	0–0	2–0	1–1	2–0	3–0	1–0	1–0	1–1
ŁKS Łódź	0–0	0–1	1–0	2–3		0–1	1–1	0–1	1–1	1–1	1–0	1–1	1–0	0–1
Pogoń Szczecin	1–0	2–0	2–0	0–1	1–2		0–0	1–0	1–0	1–0	1–0	2–0	2–0	1–2
Polonia Bytom	2–1	2–2	2–1	1–0	2–3	0–0		1–1	1–4	2–0	1–2	1–2	0–0	2–1
Odra Opole	2–1	1–0	0–2	0–0	1–1	0–0	0–3		0–0	2–0	3–2	1–0	1–1	0–2
Ruch Chorzów	2–2	3–1	6–2	1–1	3–2	6–2	3–1	3–1		2–0	1–0	3–0	0–0	2–0
Stal Rzeszów	2–2	1–2	3–2	1–0	0–0	3–0	3–1	0–0	0–4		2–0	2–0	1–0	2–0
Szombierki Bytom	7–3	2–0	2–1	0–1	4–2	3–1	1–2	2–1	2–2	2–1		0–3	0–2	2–1
Śląsk Wrocław	1–1	0–2	0–0	1–2	0–1	1–0	0–0	1–0	0–0	3–0	2–1		0–0	4–0
Wisła Kraków	0–0	0–0	0–1	0–2	0–1	1–0	3–0	2–2	2–2	1–1	1–1	0–1		2–1
Zagłębie Sosnowiec	0–1	2–2	2–1	2–1	1–0	4–0	1–0	1–1	0–2	0–0	0–1	0–0	0–0	

Source: 90minut.pl (in Polish)
Legend: Blue = home team win; Yellow = draw; Red = away team win.

== Top goalscorers ==
Rank	Player	Club	Goals
1	(Poland) Włodzimierz Lubański	Górnik Zabrze	24
2	(Poland) Eugeniusz Faber	Ruch Chorzów	15
2	(Poland) Andrzej Jarosik	Zagłębie Sosnowiec	15
2	(Poland) Jerzy Wilim	Szombierki Bytom	15
5	(Poland) Edward Herman	Ruch Chorzów	14
6	(Poland) Józef Gomoluch	Ruch Chorzów	12
7	(Poland) Jan Domarski	Stal Rzeszów	9
7	(Poland) Ryszard Szymczak	Gwardia Warsaw	9
9	(Poland) Lucjan Brychczy	Legia Warsaw	8
9	(Poland) Robert Gadocha	Legia Warsaw	8
9	(Poland) Jan Musiał	Polonia Bytom	8
9	(Poland) Gerard Rother	GKS Katowice	8
9	(Poland) Janusz Żmijewski	Legia Warsaw	8

== Attendances ==
No.	Club	Average
1	Ruch Chorzów	29,615
2	Pogoń Szczecin	18,077
3	Śląsk Wrocław	17,462
4	ŁKS	16,077
5	Górnik Zabrze	15,000
6	Polonia Bytom	14,615
7	Zagłębie Sosnowiec	13,385
8	Wisła Kraków	13,154
9	Legia Warszawa	11,462
10	Stal Rzeszów	11,308
11	Odra Opole	7,615
12	Gwardia Warszawa	6,769
13	Katowice	6,362
14	Szombierki Bytom	6,346
