= 2015–16 I liga =

I liga
- Season: 2015–16
- Champions: Arka Gdynia
- Promoted: Arka Gdynia; Wisła Płock
- Relegated: Zawisza Bydgoszcz; Rozwój Katowice; GKS Bełchatów
- Matches played: 291
- Goals scored: 735 (2.53 per match)
- Top goalscorer: Szymon Lewicki (16 goals)
- Biggest home win: Dolcan 6–1 Pogoń; Zawisza 6–1 Zagłębie; Płock 5–0 Zawisza
- Biggest away win: Chojnice 1–6 Bytovia
- Highest scoring: Chojnice 1–6 Bytovia; Dolcan 6–1 Pogoń; Zawisza 6–1 Zagłębie; Dolcan 3–4 Miedź
- Highest attendance: 11,503; Arka 1–1 Chrobry (5 June 2016)
- Lowest attendance: 0 Katowice 2–2 Stomil; Katowice 2–0 Dolcan; Katowice 1–0 Zawisza; Chrobry 0–1 Arka; Chrobry 1–1 Sandecja; Zawisza 0–3 Katowice
- Total attendance: 494,077
- Average attendance: 1,697 ▼2.0%

The 2015–16 I liga is the 8th season of the Polish I liga under its current title, and the 68th season of the second highest division in the Polish football league system since its establishment in 1949. The league is operated by the Polish Football Association (PZPN). The league is contested by 18 teams. The regular season was played in a round-robin tournament. The season began on 1 August 2015, and concluded on 6 June 2016. After the 19th matchday the league will be on winter break between 6 December 2015 and 3 March 2016.

According to the competition rules, all clubs are required to field at least one youth player (born in 1995 or later and Polish or trained in Poland) in every game (except for the times when the only youth player on the roster is sent off or unable to continue playing).

== Changes from last season ==
The following teams have changed division since the 2014–15 season.

=== To I Liga ===
Promoted from II liga

- MKS Kluczbork
- Zagłębie Sosnowiec
- Rozwój Katowice

Relegated from Ekstraklasa

- Zawisza Bydgoszcz
- GKS Bełchatów

=== From I Liga ===
Relegated to II liga

- GKS Tychy

Promoted to Ekstraklasa

- Zagłębie Lubin
- Termalica Bruk-Bet Nieciecza

== Team overview ==
=== Stadiums and locations ===
Team	Stadium	Capacity
Arka Gdynia	Stadion GOSiR	15,139
Bytovia Bytów	Stadion MOSiR	1,500
Chojniczanka Chojnice	Stadion Miejski Chojniczanka 1930	3,000
Chrobry Głogów	Stadion GOS	2,817
Dolcan Ząbki	Dolcan Arena	2,100
GKS Bełchatów	GIEKSA Arena	5,238
GKS Katowice	Stadion GKS Katowice	6,710
Miedź Legnica	Stadion Orła Białego	6,244
MKS Kluczbork	Stadion Miejski	2,776
Olimpia Grudziądz	Stadion im. Bronisława Malinowskiego	5,000
Pogoń Siedlce	Stadion ROSRRiT ^{1}	2,901
Rozwój Katowice	Stadion GKS Katowice ^{2}	6,710
Sandecja Nowy Sącz	Stadion im. Ojca Władysława Augustynka	2,850
Stomil Olsztyn	OSiR Stadium	3,500
Wigry Suwałki	Stadion OSiR	3,060
Wisła Płock	Kazimierz Górski Stadium	10,978
Zagłębie Sosnowiec	The People's Stadium	7,500
Zawisza Bydgoszcz	Zdzisław Krzyszkowiak Stadium	20,247

1. Pogoń Siedlce played autumn round (8 home games) at Stadion Znicza (cap. 2,150) in Pruszków.
2. Rozwój Katowice played autumn round (11 home games) at their own Stadion Rozwoju (cap. 2,472).

== League table ==
Pos	Team	Pld	W	D	L	GF	GA	GD	Pts	Promotion or Relegation
1	Arka Gdynia (C, P)	34	19	12	3	60	29	+31	69	Promotion to Ekstraklasa
2	Wisła Płock (P)	34	19	6	9	51	28	+23	63	Promotion to Ekstraklasa
3	Zagłębie Sosnowiec	34	16	4	14	53	53	0	52 (Note: Head-to-head record: Zagłębie 9 points, GKS Katowice 6 points, Zawisza 3 points.)	
4	GKS Katowice	34	15	7	12	42	36	+6	52	
5	Zawisza Bydgoszcz (Note: Zawisza Bydgoszcz did not receive a license for the 2016–17 season, thus relegation play-off between the 15th-placed team of I liga (MKS Kluczbork) and the 4th-placed team of II liga (Wisła Puławy) was not held and both will play in the 2016–17 I liga.) (R)	34	15	7	12	57	51	+6	52	Relegation to Klasa B
6	Chrobry Głogów	34	14	9	11	47	33	+14	51 (Note: Head-to-head record: Chrobry - Miedź 2–1, Miedź - Chrobry 0–2)	
7	Miedź Legnica	34	13	12	9	41	34	+7	51	
8	Bytovia Bytów	34	11	15	8	46	44	+2	48	
9	Sandecja Nowy Sącz	34	13	8	13	51	43	+8	47	
10	Wigry Suwałki	34	12	9	13	41	35	+6	45	
11	Stomil Olsztyn	34	11	11	12	34	42	−8	44	
12	Chojniczanka Chojnice	34	12	7	15	40	45	−5	43	
13	Olimpia Grudziądz	34	11	9	14	39	43	−4	42	
14	Pogoń Siedlce	34	11	8	15	31	46	−15	41 (Note: Head-to-head record: Pogoń - Kluczbork 3–0, Kluczbork - Pogoń 3–2.)	
15	MKS Kluczbork	34	11	8	15	40	55	−15	41	
16	GKS Bełchatów (R)	34	10	8	16	35	40	−5	38	Relegation to II liga
17	Rozwój Katowice (R)	34	11	2	21	35	56	−21	35	Relegation to II liga
18	Dolcan Ząbki (Note: Dolcan Ząbki withdrew from a competition after 19th round.)	34	8	6	20	37	67	−30	30	Club withdrew from competition

Source: 90minut.pl
Rules for classification: 1. points won; 2. points in head-to-head matches; 3. goal difference in hth matches; 4. goals scored in hth matches; 5. away goals in hth matches (only if two teams are tied); 6. total goal difference; 7. total goals scored; 8. fairplay ranking.
(C) Champions; (P) Promoted; (R) Relegated

== Results ==
Home \ Away	ARK	BYT	CCH	GŁO	DOL	BEŁ	KAT	MLE	KLU	GRU	PSI	ROZ	SNS	STO	WIG	WPK	ZSO	ZAW
Arka Gdynia		1–1	0–0	1–1	3–2	2–1	1–0	2–0	1–1	0–0	3–0	4–0	2–1	0–1	0–2	4–2	2–2	1–1
Bytovia Bytów	1–1		1–1	0–3	1–4	2–2	0–3	0–0	2–1	2–2	3–1	2–1	1–0	1–1	0–0	1–2	3–0	2–2
Chojniczanka Chojnice	2–3	1–6		1–1	1–1	2–0	0–2	1–0	3–1	2–1	1–0	1–3	0–1	1–1	0–1	2–1	2–0	0–2
Chrobry Głogów	0–1	0–1	0–1		3–0 (Note: Dolcan withdrew from a competition after 19th round.)	1–2	0–0	2–1	5–1	2–1	1–1	1–2	1–1	3–0	3–0	2–0	1–3	3–1
Dolcan Ząbki	0–3	0–3	0–3	1–1		0–3	0–3	3–4	1–1	0–3	6–1	1–0	0–3	1–0	0–3	0–1	4–1	0–3
GKS Bełchatów	1–1	5–1	2–1	1–1	1–1		1–2	0–1	0–2	1–2	0–0	0–2	1–0	0–1	0–2	0–2	2–0	2–1
GKS Katowice	0–2	0–2	2–2	0–0	2–0	1–0		0–1	5–1	0–2	1–0	2–2	2–4	2–2	2–0	2–1	0–1	1–0
Miedź Legnica	0–0	2–0	2–2	0–2	1–1	1–1	1–1		4–1	4–0	1–1	4–0	3–1	1–0	0–0	1–0	1–4	1–1
MKS Kluczbork	0–2	1–1	1–3	0–2	3–0	0–0	1–2	0–0		1–0	3–2	1–0	2–4	3–0	1–1	1–2	1–1	0–1
Olimpia Grudziądz	1–2	1–1	1–0	2–1	1–1	1–3	1–0	0–1	1–2		0–1	0–1	3–2	2–0	0–2	1–1	4–2	2–3
Pogoń Siedlce	2–2	0–0	1–0	1–0	0–4	1–0	2–0	0–0	3–0	1–2		2–0	0–0	0–1	1–0	0–0	3–2	0–3
Rozwój Katowice	1–4	1–1	1–3	0–1	3–0	2–1	1–2	2–1	0–1	0–2	2–3		2–0	2–1	1–3	2–1	0–1	1–3
Sandecja Nowy Sącz	0–1	0–1	3–1	1–1	3–2	2–0	4–0	3–2	1–2	0–0	3–0	1–0		0–2	1–0	1–3	3–3	4–0
Stomil Olsztyn	0–4	0–0	2–0	2–1	3–0	0–2	0–0	0–1	1–0	1–1	2–0	2–1	2–2		2–2	1–1	2–4	1–1
Wigry Suwałki	0–1	2–2	0–1	1–2	0–1	2–2	0–1	0–0	2–2	2–1	3–1	4–0	2–0	1–2		1–2	0–2	0–1
Wisła Płock	0–2	2–1	2–1	0–1	3–0	2–0	2–0	2–0	3–0	3–0	0–2	1–0	0–0	0–0	0–0		3–1	5–0
Zagłębie Sosnowiec	4–2	2–0	2–1	2–0	3–0	0–1	2–1	0–1	0–2	0–0	2–1	0–1	2–0	2–1	2–3	0–1		2–1
Zawisza Bydgoszcz	2–2	2–3	1–0	4–1	0–3	1–0	0–3	4–1	2–3	1–1	1–0	2–1	2–2	3–0	1–2	1–3	6–1	

Source: 90minut.pl
Legend: Blue = home team win; Yellow = draw; Red = away team win.

== I liga play-off ==
The 15th place team from the regular season will compete in a play-off with the 4th place team from II liga. Matches will be played 11 and 19 June 2016. The winner will compete in the I liga. Host of first match was decided on 6 June 2016.

On 9 June 2016 Zawisza Bydgoszcz did not receive a license for the 2016–17 season, thus relegation play-off between the 15th-placed team of I liga (MKS Kluczbork) and the 4th-placed team of II liga (Wisła Puławy) was not held and both will play in the 2016–17 I liga.

== Top goalscorers ==
Rank	Player	Club	Goals
1	(Poland) Szymon Lewicki	Zawisza Bydgoszcz	16
2	(Poland) Arkadiusz Aleksander	Sandecja Nowy Sącz	15
2	(Poland) Maciej Górski	Chrobry Głogów	15
4	(Poland) Janusz Surdykowski	Bytovia Bytów	14
5	(Poland) Kamil Drygas	Zawisza Bydgoszcz	13
5	(Poland) Mikołaj Lebedyński	Wisła Płock	13
7	(Poland) Paweł Abbott	Arka Gdynia	12
7	(Poland) Michał Fidziukiewicz	Zagłębie Sosnowiec	12
7	(Poland) Grzegorz Goncerz	GKS Katowice	12
7	(Poland) Arkadiusz Reca	Wisła Płock	12
11	(Poland) Kamil Adamek	Wigry Suwałki	11
