= Amine Naïfi =

French footballer (born 1999)

Personal information
- Full name: Mohamed Amine Naïfi
- Date of birth: 19 December 1999 (age 26)
- Place of birth: France
- Height: 1.88 m (6 ft 2 in)
- Positions: Midfielder; winger

Team information
- Current team: Stal Rzeszów

Youth career
- ES Woippy
- –2017: Metz

Senior career*
Years	Team	Apps	(Gls)
2017–2019	CSO Amnéville	37	(4)
2019–2021	Sarre-Union	21	(4)
2021–2022	Schiltigheim	22	(0)
2022	Sarre-Union	8	(6)
2023–2024	Differdange 03	12	(6)
2023–2024	→ 1. FC Saarbrücken (loan)	27	(5)
2024–2026	1. FC Saarbrücken	18	(2)
2026–	Stal Rzeszów	0	(0)
- * Club domestic league appearances and goals as of 30 May 2026

Mohamed Amine Naïfi (born 19 December 1999) is a French professional footballer who plays as a midfielder or striker for I liga club Stal Rzeszów.

== Early life ==
He is a native of Moselle, France.

== Career ==
He started his career with French side CSO Amnéville. In 2019, he signed for French side US Sarre-Union. In 2021, he signed for French side Schiltigheim. In 2023, he signed for Luxembourgish side Differdange 03. He helped the club win the 2022–23 Luxembourg Cup. After that, he was sent on loan to German side 1. FC Saarbrücken.

On 2 June 2024, 1. FC Saarbrücken made the transfer permanent and signed a two-year contract with Naïfi.

On 16 September 2026, Naïfi signed with Polish second division club Stal Rzeszów on a one-year deal, with an option for another year.

== Style of play ==
He mainly operates as a midfielder or winger. He is known for his agility and dribbling ability.

== Personal life ==
He is the son of Rachid Naifi.

== Honours ==
Differdange 03

- Luxembourg Cup: 2022–23
