= Adam Nocoń =

Polish football manager

Personal information
- Date of birth: 12 June 1971 (age 55)
- Place of birth: Bolesławiec, Poland
- Height: 1.89 m (6 ft 2 in)
- Position: Defender

Team information
- Current team: Pogoń Siedlce (manager)

Senior career*
Years	Team	Apps	(Gls)
- Górnik Zabrze
1992–1995	Ruch Radzionków		
1995–1997	Carbo Gliwice		
1997–2002	GKS Bełchatów		
2002	Górnik Łęczna		
2003–2004	Ruch Radzionków		

Managerial career
- 2005–2007: Przyszłość Rogów
- 2007–2008: Beskid Skoczów
- 2008–2010: Skałka Żabnica
- 2010–2011: GKS Tychy
- 2011: Nadwiślan Góra
- 2012–2015: Nadwiślan Góra
- 2015: LKS Bełk
- 2015–2017: Ruch Zdzieszowice
- 2017: Stal Bielsko-Biała
- 2017–2018: Podbeskidzie Bielsko-Biała
- 2018–2020: Olimpia Elbląg
- 2020–2021: Chojniczanka Chojnice
- 2022: Górnik Zabrze (youth)
- 2022–2024: Odra Opole
- 2024–: Pogoń Siedlce
- * Club domestic league appearances and goals

Adam Nocoń (born 12 June 1971) is a Polish professional football manager and former player who currently manages I liga club Pogoń Siedlce. As a player, he played 11 games in the 1998–99 Ekstraklasa for GKS Bełchatów.

As a manager, Nocoń has managed I liga teams Podbeskidzie Bielsko-Biała, Odra Opole and Pogoń Siedlce, as well as Górnik Zabrze's U19 team.

== Managerial statistics ==
As of match played 8 November 2026

Managerial record by team and tenure
Team	From	To	Record							
Team	From	To	G	W	D	L	GF	GA	GD	Win %
Przyszłość Rogów	30 September 2005	7 May 2007	56	31	16	9	110	58	+52	55.36
Beskid Skoczów	4 July 2007	30 June 2008	33	23	7	3	82	21	+61	69.70
Skałka Żabnica	1 July 2008	30 June 2010	60	42	7	11	146	51	+95	70.00
GKS Tychy	11 July 2010	28 March 2011	23	12	6	5	39	20	+19	52.17
Nadwiślan Góra	29 June 2011	3 October 2011	10	6	2	2	25	12	+13	60.00
Nadwiślan Góra	2 January 2012	28 June 2015	123	71	23	29	277	146	+131	57.72
LKS Bełk	23 September 2015	23 December 2015	8	3	1	4	13	14	−1	37.50
Ruch Zdzieszowice	23 December 2015	27 June 2017	58	37	11	10	113	43	+70	63.79
Stal Bielsko-Biala	27 June 2017	16 August 2017	4	4	0	0	19	1	+18	100.00
Podbeskidzie Bielsko-Biala	16 August 2017	30 June 2018	32	11	12	9	36	33	+3	34.38
Olimpia Elbląg	27 September 2018	16 June 2020	51	20	21	10	65	50	+15	39.22
Chojniczanka Chojnice	1 August 2020	28 May 2021	38	20	10	8	64	36	+28	52.63
Odra Opole	19 October 2022	30 May 2024	56	22	13	21	66	57	+9	39.29
Pogoń Siedlce	1 October 2024	Present	74	22	20	32	85	98	−13	29.73
Total			626	324	149	153	1,140	640	+500	51.76

== Honours ==
=== Managerial ===
Przyszłość Rogów

- Polish Cup (Silesia regionals): 2005–06
- Polish Cup (Racibórz regionals): 2005–06, 2006–07

Skałka Żabnica

- IV liga Silesia II: 2008–09

Nadwiślan Góra

- III liga Opole-Silesia: 2013–14
- IV liga Silesia II: 2012–13
- Polish Cup (Tychy regionals): 2012–13

Ruch Zdzieszowice

- Polish Cup (Opole regionals): 2016–17

Individual

- I liga Coach of the Month: September 2023, May 2025
