= Shun Shibata =

Japanese footballer

Personal information
- Date of birth: 15 June 1997 (age 29)
- Place of birth: Toyota, Japan
- Height: 1.65 m (5 ft 5 in)
- Position: Midfielder

Team information
- Current team: Tukums 2000
- Number: 7

Youth career
- –2015: Nagoya Grampus

Senior career*
Years	Team	Apps	(Gls)
2016–2017	SV Gonsenheim	21	(2)
2019	Auda	27	(6)
2020–2021	Olimpia Zambrów	33	(3)
2021–2023	Stomil Olsztyn	44	(2)
2023–2024	GKS Katowice	29	(0)
2024–2025	Warta Poznań	15	(0)
2025–2026	Chojniczanka Chojnice	14	(1)
2026–	Tukums 2000	28	(0)
- * Club domestic league appearances and goals as of 10 November 2026

Shun Shibata (born 15 June 1997) is a Japanese professional footballer who plays as a defensive midfielder for Latvian club Tukums 2000.

== Career ==
In 2016, Shibata signed for German fifth division side SV Gonsenheim. Before the 2019 season, he signed for Auda in the Latvian second division. Before the second half of the 2019–20 season, he joined Polish fourth division club Olimpia Zambrów. In 2021, Shibata moved to Stomil Olsztyn in the Polish second division. On 21 August 2021, he made his debut for the team in a 2–0 loss against Widzew Łódź. On 21 July 2023, GKS Katowice announced the signing of Shibata on a two-year deal for an undisclosed fee.

On 30 August 2024, Shibata signed a one-year deal with Warta Poznań, lasting through the 2024–25 season, with an option to extend for an additional year.

On 9 July 2025, Shibata moved to II liga club Chojniczanka Chojnice on a season-long deal, with a one-year option. In January 2026, he left Chojniczanka by mutual consent.

== Career statistics ==
As of match played 15 June 2026

Appearances and goals by club, season and competition
Club	Season	League			National cup (Note: Includes Polish Cup)		Europe		Other		Total	
Club	Season	Division	Apps	Goals	Apps	Goals	Apps	Goals	Apps	Goals	Apps	Goals
SV Gonsenheim	2016–17	Oberliga Rheinland-Pfalz/Saar	12	2	—		—		—		12	2
SV Gonsenheim	2017–18	Oberliga Rheinland-Pfalz/Saar	9	0	—		—		—		9	0
SV Gonsenheim	Total		21	2	—		—		—		21	2
Auda	2019	Latvian First League	27	6	0	0	—		—		27	6
Olimpia Zambrów	2019–20	III liga, gr. I	1	0	—		—		—		1	0
Olimpia Zambrów	2020–21	III liga, gr. I	32	3	—		—		—		32	3
Olimpia Zambrów	Total		33	3	—		—		—		33	3
Stomil Olsztyn	2021–22	I liga	12	0	1	0	—		—		13	0
Stomil Olsztyn	2022–23	II liga	31	2	1	0	—		1 (Note: Appearance in II liga promotion play-offs)	0	33	2
Stomil Olsztyn	Total		43	2	2	0	—		1	0	46	2
GKS Katowice	2023–24	I liga	29	0	1	0	—		—		30	0
Warta Poznań	2024–25	I liga	15	0	1	0	—		—		16	0
Chojniczanka Chojnice	2025–26	II liga	14	1	3	0	—		—		17	1
FK Tukums 2000	2026	Latvian Higher League	17	0	0	0	—		—		17	0
Career total			199	14	7	0	0	0	1	0	207	14

== Honours ==
Olimpia Zambrów

- Polish Cup (Podlasie regionals): 2020–21
