= Piotr Prędota =

Polish footballer

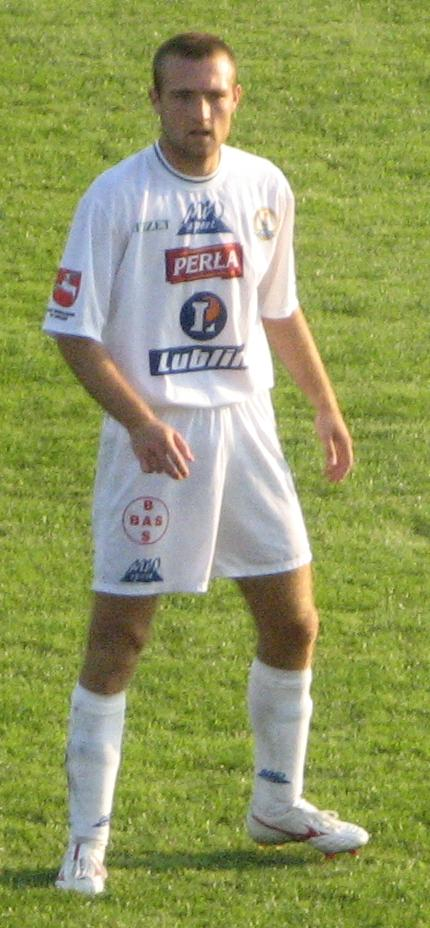

Personal information
- Date of birth: 20 July 1982 (age 44)
- Place of birth: Lublin, Poland
- Height: 1.81 m (5 ft 11 1/2 in)
- Position: Forward

Team information
- Current team: Sparta Rejowiec Fabryczny
- Number: 16

Senior career*
Years	Team	Apps	(Gls)
2001–2004	Motor Lublin	110	(33)
2004	Górnik Łęczna	1	(0)
2005–2007	Motor Lublin	86	(23)
2008–2009	Piast Gliwice	28	(1)
2009–2010	Pogoń Szczecin	23	(3)
2011–2012	Motor Lublin	48	(11)
2012–2013	Radomiak Radom	32	(6)
2013–2018	Stal Rzeszów	152	(77)
2018–2020	Avia Świdnik	69	(12)
2021–2024	GLKS Głusk	37	(25)
2025–	Sparta Rejowiec Fabryczny	1	(0)
- * Club domestic league appearances and goals as of 10:37, 24 June 2025 (UTC)~

Piotr Prędota (born 20 July 1982) is a Polish footballer who plays as a forward for Sparta Rejowiec Fabryczny.

== Honours ==
Motor Lublin

- III liga, group IV: 2006–07

Stal Rzeszów

- III liga Lublin–Subcarpathia: 2014–15
- Polish Cup (Rzeszów-Dębica regionals): 2015–16

Individual

- Ekstraklasa Cup top scorer: 2008–09
