= Jakub Lemanowicz =

Polish footballer

Personal information
- Date of birth: 27 March 1999 (age 27)
- Place of birth: Płock, Poland
- Height: 1.90 m (6 ft 3 in)
- Position: Goalkeeper

Team information
- Current team: Pogoń Siedlce
- Number: 57

Youth career
- –2012: Pegaz Drobin
- 2012–2015: Wisła Płock

Senior career*
Years	Team	Apps	(Gls)
2015–2018	Wisła Płock II		
2018	Wisła Płock	0	(0)
2018–2019	Sokół Aleksandrów Łódzki	28	(0)
2019–2020	Olimpia Grudziądz	7	(0)
2020–2021	Świt Nowy Dwór Mazowiecki	18	(0)
2022–2025	Polonia Warsaw	39	(0)
2025	→ Pogoń Siedlce (loan)	14	(0)
2025–	Pogoń Siedlce	33	(0)
- * Club domestic league appearances and goals as of 20:23, 26 May 2026 (UTC)

Jakub Lemanowicz (born 27 March 1999) is a Polish professional footballer who plays as a goalkeeper for I liga club Pogoń Siedlce.

== Honours ==
Polonia Warsaw

- II liga: 2022–23
