= Tadeusz Hogendorf =

Polish footballer (1918–2010)

Personal information
- Full name: Tadeusz Zdzisław Hogendorf
- Date of birth: 19 December 1918
- Place of birth: Rzeszów, Poland
- Date of death: 12 June 2010 (aged 91)
- Place of death: Rzeszów, Poland
- Height: 1.76 m (5 ft 9 in)
- Positions: Midfielder; forward

Youth career
- –1936: Resovia Rzeszów

Senior career*
| Years | Team | Apps | (Gls) |
| 1936–1938 | Resovia Rzeszów | | |
| 1938–1939 | Warszawianka | 9 | (0) |
| 1945 | Pogoń Katowice | | |
| 1945 | Baltia Gdańsk | 7 | (7) |
| 1945–1952 | ŁKS Łódź | 96 | (23) |
| 1953–1955 | Gwardia Łódź | | |
| 1955–1956 | Stal Rzeszów | | |

International career
| 1947–1949 | Poland | 6 | (2) |

Managerial career
- 1955: Stal Rzeszów
- 1960–1961: Resovia Rzeszów
- 1961–1962: Stal Łańcut
- Lechia Sędziszów Małopolski
- * Club domestic league appearances and goals

Tadeusz Hogendorf (19 December 1918 – 12 June 2010) was a Polish footballer who played in midfield as well as being a forward.

== Biography ==
Hogendorf was born in Rzeszów just after the conclusion of World War I when Poland became an independent state. Hogendorf started playing football with his local team Resovia Rzeszów, breaking into the first team in 1936. In 1937, Resovia were competing for promotion to the I liga, needing to beat Rewere Stanisławów in the final game to be promoted. Due to the club having no manager to organise the players, Hogendorf and Stanisław Baran went missing a few days before the game spending time with a local count's daughters instead of focusing on the game. Resovia ended up drawing the game 3–3 and failed to win promotion. In 1938, Hogendorf joined Warszawianka who played in the I liga. He managed 9 appearances for the top division side before the outbreak of World War II.

During the war, Hogendorf continued to play in a team made of Polish players. The teams would be transported around Poland and play teams composed of Nazi airmen or soldiers. Hogendorf claimed that the Germans wanted the Polish players to play for teams in Germany, but all the Polish players refused the offer.

After the war, Hogendorf had brief spells with Pogoń Katowice and Baltia Gdańsk (who later became Lechia Gdańsk). While with Baltia, Hogendorf was involved in the clubs first ever competitive game, and scored 7 goals in 7 appearances during his time at the club. Due to his successful spell with Lechia, Hogendorf talked about the lengths ŁKS Łódź went to sign the best players of Lechia, stating that as the club's officials were getting nervous the players wouldn't sign, they took the players to a night club to get them drunk and take them to Łódź. When the players woke up the next morning in Łódź, they decided to sign for the club. At ŁKS Łódź, Hogendorf had the longest spell of his career, spending seven years with the club and making over 100 appearances. Although his stats from his first two seasons are unknown, it is known that he scored 23 goals in 96 appearances for ŁKS in the I liga. Due to his performances for the club, he is classed as a ŁKS Łódź legend. During his time with ŁKS Łódź, he also caught the attention of the Poland national team management and was called up to play for his country. In total, Hogendorf made six appearances for Poland and scored two goals, making his debut and scoring his debut goal in a match against Czechoslovakia. After his time with ŁKSm he joined Gwardia Łódźm before finishing his playing career back in his home town with Stal Rzeszów.

After his playing career, Hogendorf focused on becoming a manager and coach. He previously held coaching roles with Włókniarz Łódź and Gwardia Łódź during his playing career and was the player-manager of Stal Rzeszów in 1955. In 1958, Hogendorf graduated from the University of Physical Education in Warsaw and started managing Resovia Rzeszów in 1960. Hogendorf managed Stal Łańcut at some point during the 1961–62 season. He also managed Lechia Sędziszów Małopolski, his last job as a manager in football.

After leaving football, Hogendorf went on to be physical education teacher in Rzeszów. In 1999 he was awarded the Officer's Cross of the Order of Polonia Restituta. In 2008, he became an Honorary Citizen of the City of Rzeszów. On 12 June 2010, aged 91, Hogendorf died in Rzeszów.

== Awards ==
=== Main awards ===
- 1975: Gold Cross of Merit
- 1976: Gold Cross of Merit
- 1982: Knight's Cross Order of Polonia Restituta
- 1999: Officer's Cross Order of Polonia Restituta

=== Other awards ===
- 1948: Gold Badge from OZPN Łódź
- 1954: Gold Badge from Gwardia Łódź
- 1958: Gold Badge from Stal Rzeszów
- 1961: Gold Badge from Resovia Rzeszów
- 1963: Gold Badge from OZPN Rzeszów
- 1965: Gold Badge from ŁKS Łódź
- 1967: Badge of the 1000th Anniversary of People's Poland
- 1975: Badge of Meritorious Activist of Physical Culture
- 1976: Badge of Honor of the Polish Football Association
- 1980: Badge for Meritorious achievement for the City of Rzeszów
- 1983: Silver Badge of Physical Culture
- 1987: Medal of the 40th Anniversary of the People's Republic of Poland
- 1987: Badge of Meritorious achievement for ŁKS
- 1995: Badge of Achievement for OZPN Association in Rzeszów
- 1995: Honorary Badge of the OZPN Association in Przemyśl
- 1995: Medal of the 75th anniversary of the Polish Football Association
- 1997: Golden Badge of Physical Culture
