= Damian Jakubik =

Polish footballer

Personal information
- Full name: Damian Jakubik
- Date of birth: 25 March 1990 (age 36)
- Place of birth: Otwock, Poland
- Height: 1.83 m (6 ft 0 in)
- Position: Right-back

Team information
- Current team: Pogoń Siedlce
- Number: 14

Youth career
- Mazur Karczew

Senior career*
Years	Team	Apps	(Gls)
2007–2008	Mazur Karczew II		
2008–2012	Mazur Karczew		
2012–2016	Dolcan Ząbki	108	(2)
2016	Górnik Łęczna	7	(0)
2016–2017	Podbeskidzie Bielsko-Biała	3	(0)
2017	Znicz Pruszków	13	(0)
2017–2025	Radomiak Radom	179	(4)
2025	→ Pogoń Siedlce (loan)	14	(1)
2025–	Pogoń Siedlce	27	(1)
- * Club domestic league appearances and goals as of 19:46, 26 May 2026 (UTC)

Damian Jakubik (born 25 March 1990) is a Polish professional footballer who plays as a right-back for I liga club Pogoń Siedlce.

== Honours ==
Radomiak Radom

- I liga: 2020–21
- II liga: 2018–19
