= Józef Gomoluch =

Polish footballer

Personal information
- Date of birth: 18 March 1939
- Place of birth: Świętochłowice, Poland
- Date of death: 2 December 2007 (aged 68)
- Place of death: Chorzów, Poland
- Height: 1.64 m (5 ft 5 in)
- Positions: Midfielder; forward

Senior career*
Years	Team	Apps	(Gls)
1950–1965	GKS Świętochłowice		
1965–1973	Ruch Chorzów	208	(41)
1973–1977	BKS Stal Bielsko-Biała		
1977–1978	GKS Świętochłowice		

International career
1967	Poland	1	(0)
- * Club domestic league appearances and goals

Józef Gomoluch (18 March 1939 – 2 December 2007) was a Polish footballer.

He played in one match for the Poland national team in 1967.

== Honours ==
Ruch Chorzów

- Ekstraklasa: 1967–68
