= Eugeniusz Faber =

Polish footballer (1939–2021)

Personal information
- Date of birth: 6 April 1939
- Place of birth: Chorzów, Poland
- Date of death: 24 September 2021 (aged 82)
- Place of death: Liévin, France
- Height: 1.69 m (5 ft 7 in)
- Position: Forward

Youth career
- Prezydent Chorzów

Senior career*
Years	Team	Apps	(Gls)
1959–1971	Ruch Chorzów	284	(104)
1971–1975	Lens	104	(44)
Total		388	(148)

International career
1959–1969	Poland	36	(11)
- * Club domestic league appearances and goals

Eugeniusz Faber (6 April 1939 – 24 September 2021) was a Polish footballer who played as a forward for Ruch Chorzów and Lens.

== Career statistics ==
=== International ===
Appearances and goals by national team and year
National team	Year	Apps	Goals
Poland	1959	2	0
Poland	1960	2	1
Poland	1961	1	0
Poland	1962	8	1
Poland	1963	6	5
Poland	1964	4	1
Poland	1965	1	0
Poland	1966	4	0
Poland	1967	3	0
Poland	1968	3	3
Poland	1969	2	0
Total		36	11

== Honours ==
Ruch Chorzów

- Ekstraklasa: 1960, 1967–68
