= Łukasz Szczoczarz =

Polish footballer (born 1984)

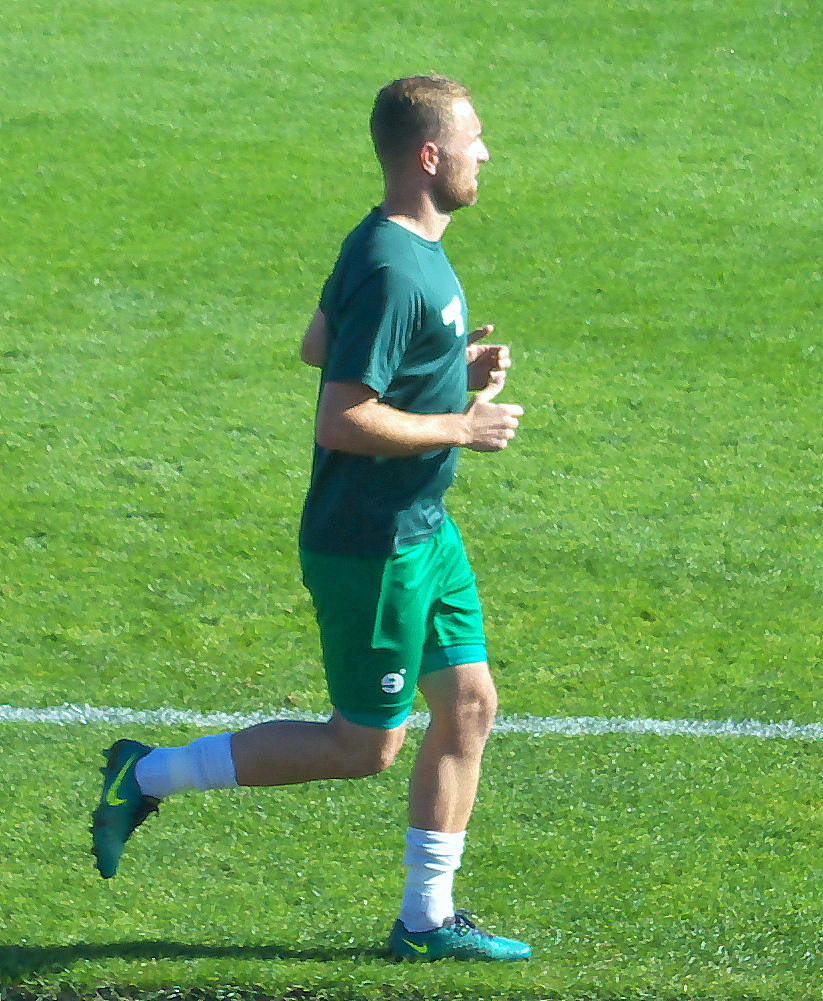

Personal information
- Full name: Łukasz Szczoczarz
- Date of birth: 19 January 1984 (age 42)
- Place of birth: Rzeszów, Poland
- Height: 1.77 m (5 ft 10 in)
- Position: Forward

Senior career*
| Years | Team | Apps | (Gls) |
| 2000–2003 | Stal Rzeszów | | |
| 2003–2009 | Cracovia | 65 | (8) |
| 2006–2007 | → Stal Rzeszów (loan) | | |
| 2008–2009 | → Okocimski KS Brzesko (loan) | 45 | (23) |
| 2009–2013 | LKS Nieciecza | 84 | (20) |
| 2013–2016 | Stal Rzeszów | 88 | (29) |
| 2016–2019 | Izolator Boguchwała | | |
| 2019–2020 | Głogovia Głogów Małopolski | 29 | (14) |
| 2021 | Stal Rzeszów II | 8 | (3) |
| 2021 | Piast Nowa Wieś | 10 | (8) |
- * Club domestic league appearances and goals

Łukasz Szczoczarz (born 19 January 1984) is a Polish former professional footballer who played as a forward.

== Career ==
In the summer of 2009, he moved to LKS Nieciecza.

== Honours ==
LKS Nieciecza

- II liga East: 2009–10

Stal Rzeszów

- III liga Lublin-Subcarpathia: 2014–15
- Polish Cup (Rzeszów-Dębica regionals): 2015–16

Głogovia Głogów Małopolski

- Regional league Rzeszów: 2018–19
