= Dawid Florian =

Polish footballer

Personal information
- Full name: Dawid Florian
- Date of birth: 26 December 1982 (age 43)
- Place of birth: Jaworzno, Poland
- Height: 1.73 m (5 ft 8 in)
- Position: Midfielder

Team information
- Current team: Ostoja Kołaczyce

Senior career*
Years	Team	Apps	(Gls)
2001–2002	Górnik Jaworzno		
2002–2007	Sandecja Nowy Sącz		
2007	Lech Poznań	8	(0)
2008–2009	Znicz Pruszków	32	(1)
2009	Kolejarz Stróże	13	(2)
2011–2013	Stal Rzeszów	36	(4)
2013	Stal Mielec	11	(2)
2013	Wisłoka Dębica		
2014–2020	Rzemieślnik Pilzno		
2020–2021	Kotwica Korczyna	19	(2)
2021–2023	Czarni 1910 Jasło	60	(9)
2023	KS Biecz	14	(0)
2023–2025	Radłovia Radłów	37	(5)
2025	Brzozovia Brzozów	13	(7)
2025–	Ostoja Kołaczyce	0	(0)
- * Club domestic league appearances and goals as of 20:44, 24 June 2025 (UTC)

Dawid Florian (born 26 December 1982) is a Polish footballer who plays as a midfielder for Klasa A club Ostoja Kołaczyce.

== Honours ==
Stal Mielec

- III liga Lublin-Subcarpathia: 2012–13

KS Biecz

- Regional league Nowy Sącz I: 2022–23
