= Jakub Sinior =

Polish footballer

Personal information
- Date of birth: 7 July 2000 (age 26)
- Place of birth: Warsaw, Poland
- Height: 1.84 m (6 ft 0 in)
- Positions: Defender; midfielder

Team information
- Current team: Pogoń Siedlce
- Number: 8

Youth career
- –2012: KP Piaseczno
- 2012–2013: UMKS Piaseczno
- 2013–2017: Legia Warsaw
- 2017–2018: Middlesbrough
- 2018–2019: Hellas Verona

Senior career*
Years	Team	Apps	(Gls)
2017	Legia Warsaw II	1	(0)
2019–2021	Zagłębie Sosnowiec	15	(0)
2020	→ Skra Częstochowa (loan)	14	(0)
2022–	Pogoń Siedlce	82	(4)

International career
2014–2015	Poland U15	8	(1)
2016	Poland U16	2	(0)
2018	Poland U18	3	(0)
2018	Poland U19	2	(0)
- * Club domestic league appearances and goals as of 19:45, 26 May 2026 (UTC)

Jakub Sinior (born 7 July 2000) is a Polish professional footballer who plays as a defender or midfielder for I liga club Pogoń Siedlce.

== Career ==
In 2017, Sinior joined the youth academy of English second division side Middlesbrough after playing for the youth academy of Legia, the most successful club in Poland.

In 2018, he joined the youth academy of Italian Serie A team Hellas Verona.

In 2019, Sinior signed for Zagłębie Sosnowiec in the Polish second division, where he made 15 league appearances.

In 2020, he was sent on loan to Polish third division outfit Skra Częstochowa.

== Honours ==
Pogoń Siedlce

- II liga: 2023–24
