= Grzegorz Goncerz =

Polish footballer (born 1988)

Personal information
- Full name: Grzegorz Goncerz
- Date of birth: 27 April 1988 (age 38)
- Place of birth: Kraków, Poland
- Height: 1.78 m (5 ft 10 in)
- Position: Forward

Senior career*
| Years | Team | Apps | (Gls) |
| –2004 | Krakus Nowa Huta | | |
| 2004–2005 | Hutnik Kraków | | |
| 2005–2006 | Górnik Zabrze | 19 | (0) |
| 2006–2007 | Kmita Zabierzów | 16 | (0) |
| 2008–2010 | Ruch Chorzów | 2 | (0) |
| 2009 | → GKS Katowice (loan) | 32 | (6) |
| 2010–2018 | GKS Katowice | 190 | (52) |
| 2018–2019 | Podbeskidzie | 14 | (0) |
| 2019–2021 | Stal Rzeszów | 71 | (19) |
| 2021–2023 | Kotwica Kołobrzeg | 61 | (21) |
| 2023–2025 | Sparta Katowice | 53 | (27) |

Managerial career
- 2025: Sparta Katowice (caretaker)
- * Club domestic league appearances and goals as of 15:17, 13 June 2025 (UTC)

Grzegorz Goncerz (born 27 April 1988) is a Polish professional footballer who plays as a forward.

== Club career ==
Goncerz started his career at Krakus Nowa Huta. He subsequently played for Hutnik Kraków, Górnik Zabrze and Kmita Zabierzów, before joining Ekstraklasa outfit Ruch Chorzów in 2008. He was loaned to GKS Katowice in 2009, and later joined the team on a permanent basis in 2010.

In the summer of 2018, Goncerz joined Podbeskidzie Bielsko-Biała. On 6 February 2019, he signed a contract with Stal Rzeszów, and on 5 July 2021, with Kotwica Kołobrzeg. After the 2022–23 II liga season, in which he played 28 games and scored 7 goals, he left the club.

On 17 July 2023, Goncerz returned to Katowice to join IV liga side Sparta Katowice. After Damian Mikołowicz's dismissal on 27 March 2025, Goncerz was appointed head coach on caretaker basis, and led Sparta to a 3–0 win over Polonia Łaziska Górne two days later.

== Managerial statistics ==
As of match played 29 March 2025

Managerial record by team and tenure
| Team | From | To | Record | | | | | | | |
| Team | From | To | G | W | D | L | GF | GA | GD | Win % |
|---|---|---|---|---|---|---|---|---|---|---|
| Sparta Katowice (caretaker) | 27 March 2025 | 30 March 2025 | 1 | 1 | 0 | 0 | 3 | 0 | +3 | 100.00 |
| Total | | | 1 | 1 | 0 | 0 | 3 | 0 | +3 | 100.00 |

== Honours ==
Stal Rzeszów

- III liga, group IV: 2018–19
- Polish Cup (Rzeszów-Dębica regionals): 2018–19

Kotwica Kołobrzeg

- III liga, group II: 2021–22

Sparta Katowice

- IV liga Silesia: 2024–25

Individual

- I liga Player of the Year: 2014
- I liga top scorer: 2014–15
