= Marian Kozerski =

Polish footballer

Personal information
- Date of birth: 12 August 1945 (age 81)
- Place of birth: Proszowice, Poland
- Position: Forward

Senior career*
Years	Team	Apps	(Gls)
1961	Proszowianka Proszowice		
1962–1965	Stal Kraśnik		
1965–1966	Lublinianka		
1966–1967	Stal Kraśnik		
1968–1976	Stal Rzeszów	123	(21)
1977–1978	Hazebrouck		
1978–1979	Resovia	14	(0)

International career
1969–1971	Poland	8	(2)
- * Club domestic league appearances and goals

Marian Kozerski (born 12 August 1945) is a Polish former footballer who played as a forward. He made eight appearances for the Poland national team from 1969 to 1971.

== Honours ==
Stal Rzeszów

- Polish Cup: 1974–75
