= Teoman Gündüz =

Turkish footballer (born 1995)

Personal information
- Date of birth: 7 June 2004 (age 22)
- Place of birth: Berlin, Germany
- Height: 1.81 m (5 ft 11 in)
- Position: Attacking midfielder

Team information
- Current team: Juventus Next Gen
- Number: 10

Youth career
- Rot-Weiß Berlin
- SV Tasmania Berlin
- Tennis Borussia Berlin
- 2013–2022: Hertha BSC

Senior career*
Years	Team	Apps	(Gls)
2022–2023	Hertha BSC II	18	(1)
2023–2026	Triestina	28	(7)
2024–2025	→ Lecco (loan)	9	(0)
2026–	Juventus Next Gen	13	(2)

International career^{‡}
2022	Turkey U18	4	(0)
2023	Turkey U19	1	(0)
- * Club domestic league appearances and goals as of 30 April 2026 ‡ National team caps and goals as of 16:52, 25 January 2026 (UTC)

Teoman Gündüz (born 7 June 2004) is a professional footballer who plays as an attacking midfielder for Serie C club Juventus Next Gen. Born in Germany, he is a youth international for Turkey.

== Club career ==
Gündüz is a product of the youth academies of the German clubs Rot-Weiß Berlin, SV Tasmania Berlin, Tennis Borussia Berlin, and Hertha BSC. In the summer of 2022, he was promoted to Hertha BSC II in the Regionalliga for the 2022–23 season. On 12 September 2023, Gündüz signed for Serie C club Triestina on a three-year contract. On 7 August 2024, he moved to Lecco on a year-long loan. He injured his cruciate ligament in November 2024, and in January 2025, returned to Triestina to rehabilitate. After a strong start to the 2025–26 season with Triestina, Gündüz transferred to Juventus Next Gen on 23 January 2026, on a contract until 2028 with an option to extend to 2030.

== International career ==
Born in Germany, Gündüz is of Turkish descent and holds dual German and Turkish citizenship. He played for the Turkey U19s for a set of friendlies in 2023, having previously represented the under-18 side in 2022.
