= Mateusz Marzec =

Polish footballer

Personal information
- Date of birth: 13 August 1994 (age 32)
- Place of birth: Ozimek, Poland
- Height: 1.78 m (5 ft 10 in)
- Position: Attacking midfielder

Team information
- Current team: Pogoń Siedlce
- Number: 17

Youth career
- –2011: Małapanew Ozimek

Senior career*
Years	Team	Apps	(Gls)
2011–2015	Małapanew Ozimek		
2015–2016	Ruch Zdzieszowice	45	(9)
2016–2018	Odra Opole	23	(2)
2017	→ Ruch Zdzieszowice (loan)	17	(9)
2018–2019	Olimpia Grudziądz	32	(7)
2019	GKS Bełchatów	20	(11)
2019–2021	Podbeskidzie Bielsko-Biała	22	(1)
2021–2023	Odra Opole	41	(9)
2023–2026	GKS Katowice	74	(9)
2026–	Pogoń Siedlce	0	(0)
- * Club domestic league appearances and goals as of 10:12, 30 May 2026 (UTC)

Mateusz Marzec (born 13 August 1994) is a Polish professional footballer who plays as a midfielder for I liga club Pogoń Siedlce.

== Career ==
At the age of 16, Marzec debuted for Polish seventh division side Małapanew Ozimek, helping them achieve promotion to fourth division in 2014.

In 2018, he signed for Olimpia Grudziądz in the Polish third division.

For the second half of the 2019–20 season, he signed for Polish second division team Podbeskidzie Bielsko-Biała, helping them achieve promotion to the top flight within a season.

On 29 July 2021, he returned to Odra Opole, signing a two-year contract.

On 4 January 2023, Marzec joined another I liga side GKS Katowice on a two-and-a-half-year deal.

On 25 June 2026, Marzec signed a one-year deal with second division club Pogoń Siedlce.

== Honours ==
Małapanew Ozimek

- IV liga Opole: 2013–14

GKS Katowice II

- Regional league Silesia IV: 2024–25
