= Wojciech Reiman =

Polish footballer

Personal information
- Full name: Wojciech Reiman
- Date of birth: 5 August 1988 (age 38)
- Place of birth: Rzeszów, Poland
- Height: 1.85 m (6 ft 1 in)
- Position: Central midfielder

Youth career
- Orły Rzeszów

Senior career*
| Years | Team | Apps | (Gls) |
| 2005–2012 | Stal Rzeszów | 119 | (21) |
| 2009–2010 | → Polonia Bytom (loan) | 1 | (0) |
| 2011–2014 | Podbeskidzie | 5 | (0) |
| 2013–2014 | → Stal Stalowa Wola (loan) | 39 | (12) |
| 2014–2016 | Raków Częstochowa | 32 | (8) |
| 2015–2016 | → Olimpia Grudziądz (loan) | 13 | (1) |
| 2016 | Puszcza Niepołomice | 4 | (3) |
| 2016–2021 | Stal Rzeszów | 155 | (62) |
| 2021–2022 | Stomil Olsztyn | 31 | (1) |
| 2022–2023 | Motor Lublin | 22 | (1) |
| 2023–2024 | Stal Łańcut | 33 | (23) |
| 2024–2026 | JKS Jarosław | 61 | (51) |
- * Club domestic league appearances and goals as of 21:27, 25 June 2026 (UTC)

Wojciech Reiman (born 5 August 1988) is a Polish professional footballer who plays as a central midfielder.

== Career ==
Reiman started his career with Stal Rzeszów.

== Honours ==
Stal Rzeszów

- III liga, group IV: 2018–19
- Polish Cup (Subcarpathia regionals): 2016–17, 2018–19
- Polish Cup (Rzeszów-Dębica regionals): 2016–17, 2018–19

Individual

- III liga, group IV top scorer: 2016–17

JKS Jarosław

- IV liga Subcarpathia: 2025–26
