= Jan Domarski =

Polish footballer (born 1946)

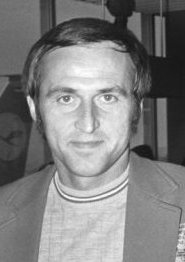
- Domarski in 1973

Personal information
- Full name: Jan Andrzej Domarski
- Date of birth: 28 October 1946 (age 79)
- Place of birth: Rzeszów, Poland
- Height: 1.77 m (5 ft 10 in)
- Position: Midfielder

Senior career*
Years	Team	Apps	(Gls)
1961–1972	Stal Rzeszów	205	(55)
1972–1976	Stal Mielec	104	(36)
1976–1978	Nîmes	59	(16)
1978–1979	Stal Rzeszów	14	(12)
1979–1981	Resovia Rzeszów	57	(11)
1984–1985	SAC Wisła Chicago		

International career
1967–1974	Poland	17	(2)

Managerial career
- 1993–1994: Stal Rzeszów
Medal record
Men's football
Representing Poland
FIFA World Cup
Third place	1974 West Germany
- * Club domestic league appearances and goals

Jan Andrzej Domarski (born 28 October 1946) is a Polish former footballer and bronze-medal winner in the 1974 World Cup tournament in Germany.

A midfielder, he played in seventeen matches for the Poland national team and was a double-champion with Stal Mielec. He is often noted for scoring a historic goal for the Poland national team on 17 October 1973 against England at Wembley Stadium in 57th minute during the final group qualifying match for the 1974 World Cup. The match ended in a 1–1, which allowed the Polish team to win the group and qualify for the 1974 World Cup. The team ultimately secured third place in the tournament. He was capped 17 times for Poland, scoring two goals.

He later coached Stal Rzeszów.

== Honours ==
Stal Mielec

- Ekstraklasa: 1972–73, 1975–76

Poland

- FIFA World Cup third place: 1974
