= Olaf Kozłowski =

Polish footballer (born 2005)

Personal information
- Date of birth: 19 May 2005 (age 21)
- Place of birth: Brussels, Belgium
- Height: 1.87 m (6 ft 2 in)
- Position: Midfielder

Team information
- Current team: Pogoń Siedlce
- Number: 19

Youth career
- 2012–2014: Eendracht Winnik
- 2014–2022: Dender
- 2022–2023: Union SG

Senior career*
Years	Team	Apps	(Gls)
2023–2024	Triestina	1	(0)
2024	→ Pro Vercelli (loan)	4	(0)
2024–2025	Schaffausen	12	(0)
2025–	Pogoń Siedlce	4	(0)

International career^{‡}
2022–2023	Poland U18	7	(1)
2023	Poland U19	2	(0)
- * Club domestic league appearances and goals as of 19:46, 26 May 2026 (UTC) ‡ National team caps and goals as of 16 August 2024

Olaf Kozłowski (born 19 May 2005) is a professional footballer who plays as a midfielder for I liga club Pogoń Siedlce. Born in Belgium, he represents Poland as a youth international.

== Early life ==
Kozłowski was born on 19 May 2005 in Brussels, Belgium. He was born to Polish parents. His family are originally from Podlaskie Voivodeship, Poland.

== Club career ==
In 2012, Kozłowski joined the youth academy of Belgian side Eendracht Winnik. In 2014, he joined the youth academy of Belgian side Dender. In 2022, he joined the youth academy of Belgian side Union SG. In 2023, he signed for Italian side Triestina. In 2024, he was sent on loan to Italian side Pro Vercelli. After that, he signed for Swiss side Schaffausen.

On 15 July 2025, Kozłowski signed a two-year contract with Polish second division club Pogoń Siedlce.

== International career ==
Kozłowski is a Poland youth international. He is eligible to represent Belgium internationally, having been born in the country. He has played for the Poland U18s and U19s.

== Style of play ==
Kozłowski mainly operates as a central midfielder, but has also played as a forward while at Union.
