= Ruggero Mannes =

Dutch footballer (born 1998)

Personal information
- Date of birth: 15 March 1998 (age 28)
- Place of birth: Rotterdam, Netherlands
- Height: 1.77 m (5 ft 10 in)
- Position: Right-back

Youth career
- VV Alexandria '66
- 2007–2016: Sparta Rotterdam

Senior career*
| Years | Team | Apps | (Gls) |
| 2016–2017 | Jong Sparta | 20 | (0) |
| 2017–2020 | Jong Almere City | 45 | (2) |
| 2017–2021 | Almere City | 24 | (0) |
| 2021–2023 | Dordrecht | 24 | (0) |
| 2024–2025 | Triestina | 0 | (0) |
| 2025 | → ND Gorica (loan) | 12 | (0) |
- * Club domestic league appearances and goals as of 25 May 2025

Ruggero Mannes (born 15 March 1998) is a Dutch professional footballer who plays as a right-back.

== Club career ==
He made his Eerste Divisie debut for Almere City on 21 December 2018 in a game against Jong PSV, as a starter.

On 9 July 2021, he joined Dordrecht.

== Career statistics ==
=== Club ===
As of 25 May 2025

Appearances and goals by club, season and competition
| Club | Season | League | | | Cup | | Other | | Total | |
| Club | Season | Division | Apps | Goals | Apps | Goals | Apps | Goals | Apps | Goals |
|---|---|---|---|---|---|---|---|---|---|---|
| Jong Sparta | 2016–17 | Tweede Divisie | 20 | 0 | 0 | 0 | 0 | 0 | 20 | 0 |
| Jong Almere City | 2017–18 | Derde Divisie | 0 | 0 | 0 | 0 | 4 (Note: Appearances in Derde Divisie playoffs) | 0 | 4 | 0 |
| Jong Almere City | 2018–19 | Tweede Divisie | 17 | 0 | 0 | 0 | 0 | 0 | 17 | 0 |
| Total | | | 37 | 0 | 0 | 0 | 4 | 0 | 41 | 0 |
| Almere City | 2018–19 | Eerste Divisie | 6 | 0 | 0 | 0 | 0 | 0 | 6 | 0 |
| Almere City | 2019–20 | Eerste Divisie | 1 | 0 | 1 | 0 | 0 | 0 | 2 | 0 |
| Almere City | 2020–21 | Eerste Divisie | 17 | 0 | 0 | 0 | 0 | 0 | 17 | 0 |
| Total | | | 24 | 0 | 1 | 0 | 0 | 0 | 25 | 0 |
| FC Dordrecht | 2021–22 | Eerste Divisie | 23 | 0 | 0 | 0 | 0 | 0 | 23 | 0 |
| FC Dordrecht | 2022–23 | Eerste Divisie | 1 | 0 | 0 | 0 | 0 | 0 | 1 | 0 |
| Total | | | 24 | 0 | 0 | 0 | 0 | 0 | 24 | 0 |
| Triestina | 2024–25 | Serie C | 0 | 0 | 0 | 0 | 0 | 0 | 0 | 0 |
| ND Gorica (loan) | 2024–25 | Slovenian Second League | 12 | 0 | 0 | 0 | 0 | 0 | 12 | 0 |
| Career total | | | 97 | 0 | 1 | 0 | 4 | 0 | 102 | 0 |
