= Stal Rzeszów (football) =

Association football club in Poland

- Full name: Stal Rzeszów Spółka Akcyjna
- Founded: 1944; 82 years ago
- Ground: Stadion Miejski w Rzeszowie
- Capacity: 12,000
- Chairman: Rafał Kalisz
- Manager: Marek Zub
- League: I liga
- 2025–26: I liga, 13th of 18
- Website: stalrzeszow.pl
Home colours	Away colours	Third colours

Stal Rzeszów, commonly referred to as Stal, is a Polish football club based in Rzeszów in the southeastern Podkarpackie voivodeship, competing in the I liga, the second tier of Polish league football, since their promotion in 2022. Formed in 1944 by aviation factory workers, the club has spent a majority of its history playing in the lower leagues of Polish football. Their highest league finish was in 1966 when they finished 7th in the Ekstraklasa. The club's greatest achievement is winning the Polish Cup in 1975. Stal also has 2 I liga titles and 5 II liga titles on its record. Stal Rzeszów is part of a multi-sports club featuring football, boxing, motorcycle speedway, and other departments. Stal Rzeszów plays their home games at the Stal Rzeszów Municipal Stadium (Polish: Stadion Miejski "Stal" w Rzeszowie).

== History ==
The history of Stal Rzeszów dates back to November 1944, when a group of sports enthusiasts, working at WSK PZL Rzeszów (Transport Equipment Enterprise) decided to form a Sports Circle. With support of the Youth Organization of the Association of Workers University (Organizacja Mlodziezy Towarzystwa Uniwersytetu Robotniczego, OM TUR), the new club was managed by Bronislaw Szczoczarz.

In March 1945, football team of PZL OM TUR was formed, under manager Jan Polak. In its first game, OM TUR faced Szturmowiec (Walter) Rzeszów, the match ended in a 2–2 draw. By the summer of 1945, OM TUR played several friendly games, facing Sokół Rzeszów (4–6), Czuwaj Łańcut (2–6), and in June 1945, it played in the City of Rzeszów Cup tournament, losing in the final 1–3 to Resovia.

In the autumn of 1946, a series of playoffs took place, in order to find best teams for the newly created Rzeszów A-Class. PZL OM TUR managed to qualify to the league, together with such teams, as Legia Krosno, Nafta Krosno, Orzel Gorlice, Sanoczanka, Cukrownia Przeworsk, Resovia, Sokol Rzeszów, Czuwaj Przemysl and Polonia Przemysl. By 1955, however, the team did not have its own field, and had to use the fields of other clubs. On 26 June 1955, the first game took place at the newly built PZL Rzeszów stadium, at Hetmanska Street. The reserve team of Poland B faced Bulgarian reserves (1–1). In the second game of the day, Stal Rzeszów, the host, tied 1–1 with Poland U-19 team.

On 15 February 1948 the name of the club was changed into Union Sports Club of Metal Workers PZL Rzeszów (Zwiakzkowy Klub Sportowy Metalowców PZL w Rzeszowie). The club was overseen by the Central Union of Metal Workers, based in Katowice. By 1949, PZL Rzeszów had six departments: boxing (since 1944), football (since 1945), track and field (since 1945), chess (since 1947), table tennis (since 1948), speedway (since 1949). Finally, in May 1949, the name of the club was changed into Union Sports Club (Zakładowy Klub Sportowy) Stal Rzeszów.

In 1953, Stal qualified to the semifinal of the Polish Cup, where it lost 3–4 to AKS Chorzów. In 1956, Stal won regional games of Rzeszów League (III level of Polish football tier), qualifying to the Second Division playoffs, where it faced Piast Gliwice (2–2, 1–0), and Arkonia Szczecin (0–2, 2–0)

After the promotion, several players joined Stal for the upcoming 1957/58 season of the Second Division. Before the games, Polish Football Association decided to form two groups of the second level. Stal was in Group South, among such sides, as Cracovia, Garbarnia Kraków, Wawel Kraków, Piast Gliwice, Concordia Knurow, Bron Radom, Stal Mielec, AKS Chelmek, Naprzod Lipiny, Szombierki Bytom, AKS Chorzów.

In its first game, Stal faced Szombierki, beating the opponent 2–1. After the first round, Stal was in the 8th position, and after the whole season, Stal had 22 points, with goals 40–30, which made it the 6th team of the group.

In mid-1958, Tadeusz Hogendorf became new manager of Stal. By the end of the season, Stal was very lucky to avoid relegation. In 1960, Stal was 8th; in 1961, 5th; and in 1962, 9th. Before the 1962 season, PZPN divided the Second Division into two groups: A and B. Stal was in Group A, which consisted of 8 teams (Unia Racibórz, Unia Tarnów, Naprzód Lipiny, Piast Gliwice, MZKS Krosno, Polonia Bydgoszcz, Slavia Ruda Slaska), and won the games, qualifying to the Ekstraklasa. The decisive game took place on 21 June 1962 in Rzeszów, vs. Piast Gliwice. With the attendance of 25,000, Stal won 2–1.

In July 1962, Stal went on a summer camp in Finland. First Ekstraklasa game took place on 12 August 1962: Stal lost 0–1 at home to Lechia Gdańsk. In the second game, Stal lost in Kraków to Wisła Kraków (0–2). First, historic victory took place in the third round, when Stal beat at home 3–0 ŁKS Łódź.

Stal remained in the Ekstraklasa for ten years, until 1972. It was regarded as an average team, without major successes. Its top player at that time was Jan Domarski, who capped for Poland 17 times.

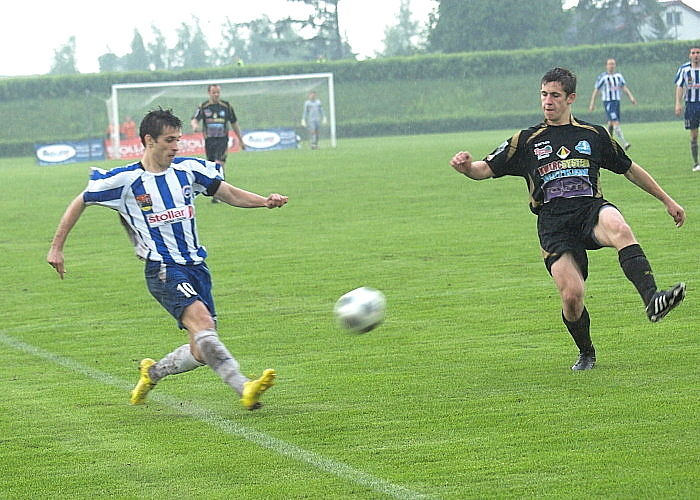
Away game with Wigry Suwałki in the 2009–10 II liga

In 2012, a joint-stock company was established which took over the original club, officially renaming it to Stal Rzeszów Spółka Akcyjna. Stal played in the II liga. From April 2018, the main sponsor of the team is Fibrain – a Polish manufacturer of fiber optic solutions.

On 27 April 2022, Stal gained promotion to the I liga following Ruch Chorzów's draw against Wisła Puławy. On 1 May 2022, after a 4–1 away win against Pogoń Siedlce, Stal secured the II liga title with three games left. Stal finished the season with 77 points.

On 17 July 2022, Stal played their first I liga match in over 28 years, drawing 3–3 with Chrobry Głogów at home. During the first season back in the I liga, Stal would win 14, draw 9, and lose 11 matches, reaching 6th place and qualifying for promotion play-offs. Stal lost the first playoff game 2–0 to Termalica Nieciecza away from home. The 2022–23 season remains to be the team's best performance in the 21st century.

During the 2023–24 and 2024–25 seasons, Stal achieved 11th and 12th places respectively. In the 2023–24 season, Stal would beat Miedź Legnica II and Puszcza Niepołomice in the Polish Cup, reaching the round of 16 where they lost to Wisła Kraków 4–1. Wisła would go on to win the cup.

Stal continues to play in the I liga as of the 2026–27 season.

== Honours ==
=== League ===
- Ekstraklasa
  - Best finish: 7th in 1966
  - Participation: 11x
- I liga
  - Champions: 1962, 1974–75
- II liga
  - Champions: 1956, 1979–80, 1983–84, 1986–87, 2021–22
  - Runners-up: 1953, 1954, 1977–78, 1978–79, 1982–83, 1985–86
- III liga
  - Champions: 1998–99, 2001–02, 2014–15, 2018–19
  - Runners-up: 2008–09, 2015–16

=== Cup ===
- Polish Cup
  - Winners: 1974–75
  - Semi-finalists: 1973–74
  - Quarter-finalists: 1971–72, 1975–76, 1990–91, 1991–92

=== Europe ===
- European Cup Winners' Cup
  - Second round: 1975–76

=== Youth teams ===
- Polish U-19 Championship
  - Third place: 1983, 1986, 2010

== Players ==
=== Current squad ===
As of 16 September 2026

Note: Flags indicate national team as defined under FIFA eligibility rules; some limited exceptions apply. Players may hold more than one non-FIFA nationality.

No.	Pos.	Nation	Player
1	GK	UKR	Svyatoslav Vanivskyi
2	DF	POL	Wojciech Machura
3	DF	BLR	Vladislav Krasovskiy
8	MF	GER	Sean Goss
11	MF	POL	Kacper Masiak
12	GK	POL	Mateusz Sokół
15	MF	POL	Szymon Pukała
16	MF	POL	Wojciech Brzęk
17	MF	POL	Oliwier Madej
19	FW	POL	Michał Musik
21	DF	GER	Marco Thiede (vice-captain)
22	MF	POL	Radosław Bieniaszewski
25	MF	POL	Filip Wolski
27	DF	GER	Marvin Rittmüller
29	MF	POL	Marcin Listkowski

No.	Pos.	Nation	Player
39	DF	POL	Marcin Kaczor
44	FW	POL	Aleksander Buksa
50	GK	SVK	Frederick Wolff
66	MF	POL	Mateusz Leniart
76	FW	POL	Szymon Salamon
77	DF	POL	Ksawery Kukułka
88	GK	POL	Marek Kozioł (captain)
—	MF	POL	Jędrzej Glapiak
—	MF	POL	Mikołaj Jaskot
—	DF	POL	Antoni Perduta
—	FW	FRA	Amine Naïfi
—	DF	POL	Jakub Sadowski
—	FW	POL	Emanuel Wiśniowski
—	DF	POL	Daniel Zieja

== Coaching staff ==
As of 6 April 2026

Position	Staff
Head coach	(Poland) Marek Zub
Assistant coach	(Poland) Michał Kordas
Assistant coach	(Poland) Karol Wójcik
Assistant coach	(Poland) Fabian Tatarski
Goalkeeping coach	(Poland) Maciej Krzyształowicz
Fitness coach	(Poland) Tomasz Grudziński
Physiotherapist	(Poland) Krystian Maruszczak
Physiotherapist	(Poland) Norbert Sajdak
Team manager	(Poland) Kamil Kot

== Stadium ==
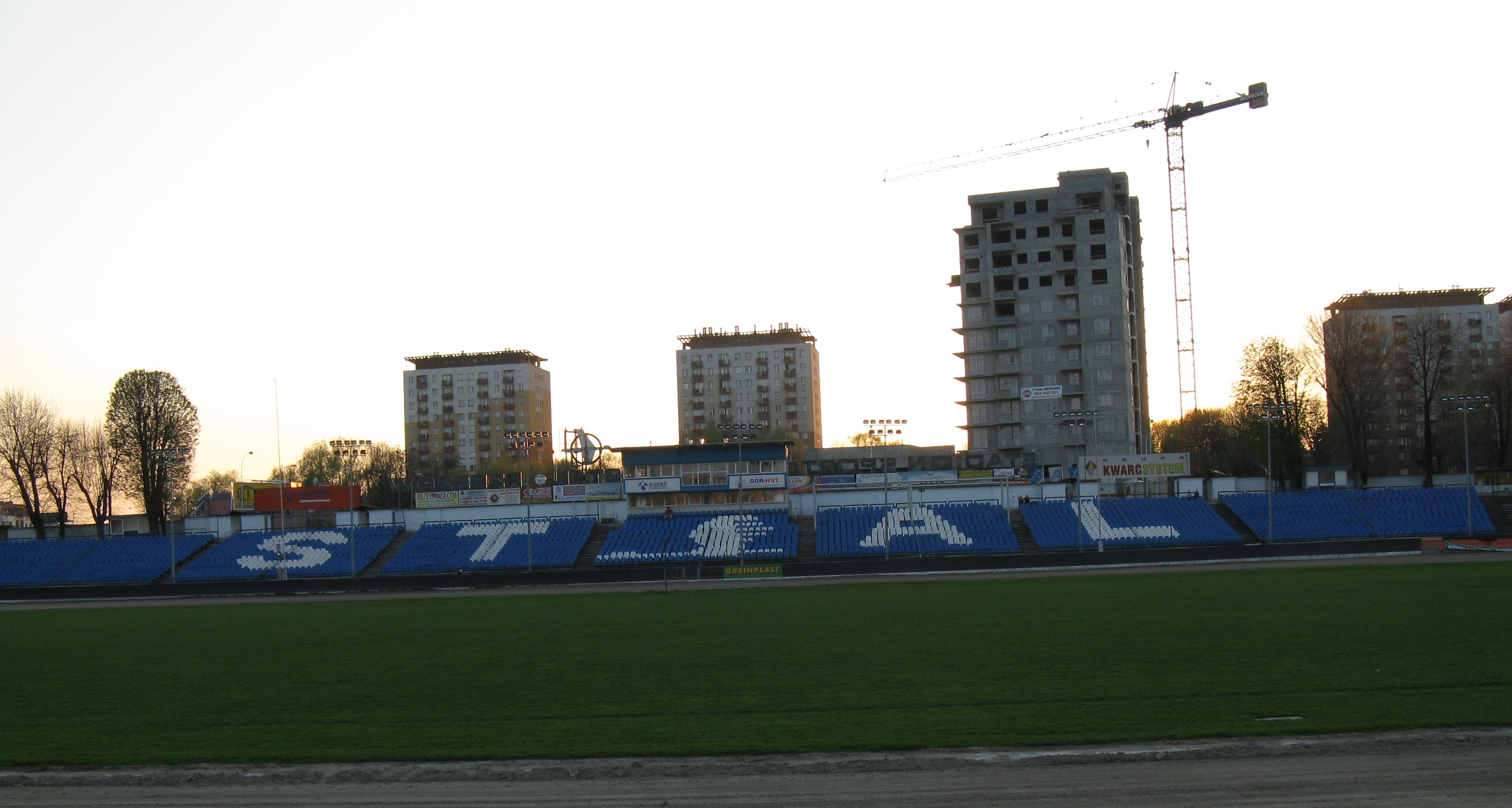
West grandstand of the stadium

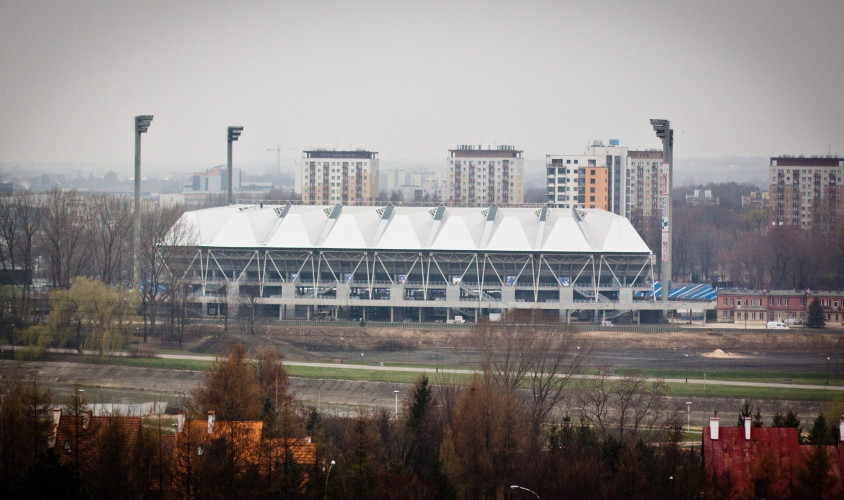
External view of the Stal Rzeszów Municipal Stadium

Stal Rzeszów plays their home games at the multi-purpose Stal Rzeszów Municipal Stadium (Polish: Stadion Miejski "Stal" w Rzeszowie) at Hetmańska 69. Built in 1955, the 11 547 capacity venue features both a football pitch and a surrounding speedway track which the motorcycle speedway department of the club uses. In 2006, the stadium was transferred to the City of Rzeszow to allow for the redevelopment project. In 2011, works started on the stadium, and in 2012, the 4 700 capacity eastern covered stand was built, costing an estimated 32 million zloty and completing the first phase of the multi-phase project. The final stadium is planned to have a capacity of 20 000 and is estimated to cost 150 million zloty. Currently, it is the 29th biggest stadium in Poland. Stal shares the stadium with Resovia while their new stadium is being completed.

== Fanbase ==
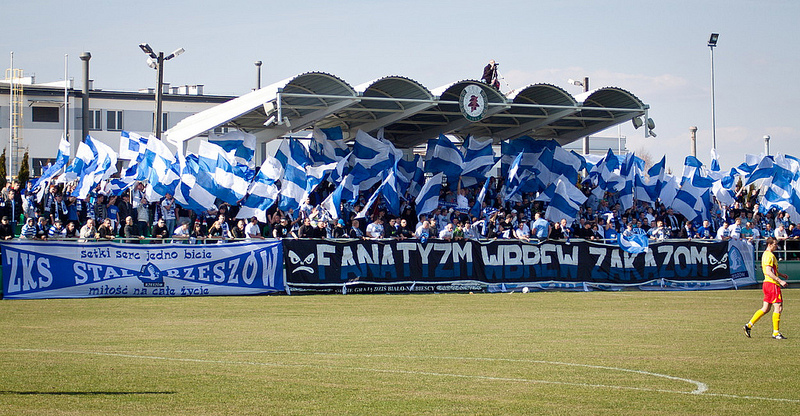
Stal Rzeszów supporters in 2012

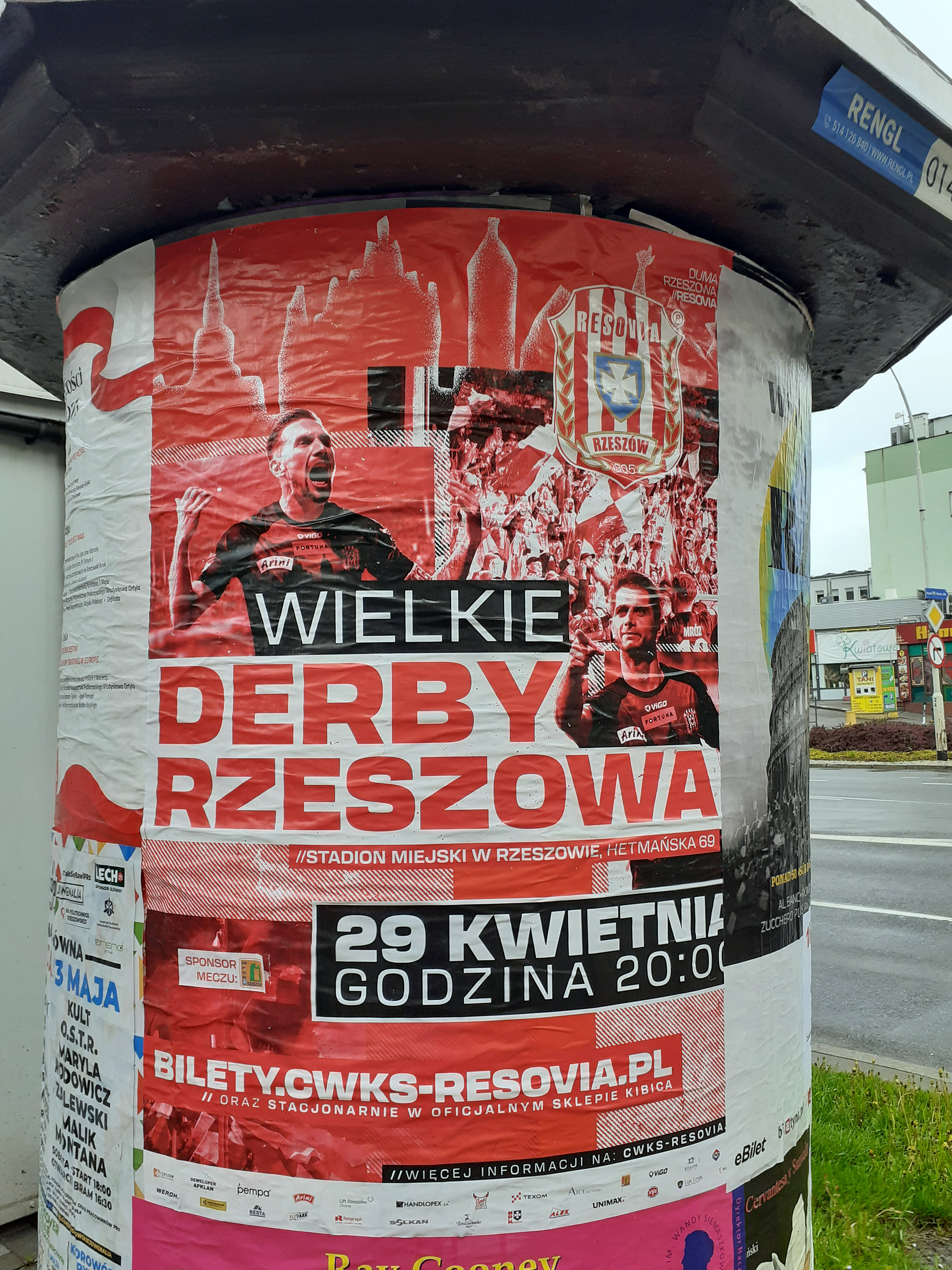
Rzeszów Derby announcement

Stal Rzeszów has a local fanbase rooted in the city of Rzeszów and the surrounding Podkarpackie region. Like most Polish football clubs, Stal has an active ultras group who organize chants and coordinate banner displays, occasionally with the usage of pyrotechnics such as flares. These elements are especially visible during high-intensity matches such as the Rzeszów derby.

== European record ==
Season	Competition	Round	Opponent	Home	Away	Aggregate
1975–76	UEFA Cup Winners' Cup	First Round	(Norway) Skeid	4–1	4–0	8–1
1975–76	UEFA Cup Winners' Cup	Second Round	(Wales) Wrexham A.F.C.	1–1	0–2	1–3

== Domestic record ==
Season	Competition	Position	Matches				Points	Goals			Comments	Most goals
Season	Competition	Position	Played	W	D	L	Points	+	-	+/-	Comments	Most goals
1953	Third tier	2/12	22	16	3	3	35	67	19	+48		
1954		2/9	16	10	2	4	22	42	17	+25		
1955		3/12	22	10	6	6	26	51	31	+20		
1956		1/12	22	16	4	2	36	60	18	+42	Promotion	
1957	Second tier	6/12	22	10	2	10	22	40	30	+10		10 Rafał Anioła
1958		10/12	22	6	7	9	19	28	33	−5		10 Ludwik Poświat
1959		8/12	22	8	7	7	23	24	23	+1		10 Ludwik Poświat
1960		5/12	22	9	5	8	23	26	29	−3		11 Ludwik Poświat
1961		9/18	34	11	12	11	34	41	40	+1		6 L. Szalacha, S. Stawarz
1962		1/8	14	10	1	3	21	26	13	+13	Promotion	7 Kazimierz Cholewa
1962–63	Top tier	9/14	26	7	9	10	23	33	39	−6		9 Ludwik Poświat
1963–64		11/14	26	8	7	11	23	32	44	−12		8 Zygmunt Marciniak
1964–65		12/14	26	5	13	8	23	30	35	−5		8 Joachim Krajczy
1965–66		7/14	26	8	10	8	26	29	30	−1		8 Jan Domarski
1966–67		8/14	26	9	8	9	26	24	30	−6		10 Jan Domarski
1967–68		11/14	26	8	7	11	23	24	39	−15		8 Jan Domarski
1968–69		12/14	26	7	8	11	22	18	31	−13		6 Stanisław Stawarz
1969–70		9/14	26	9	5	12	23	30	36	−6		10 Jan Domarski
1970–71		9/14	26	6	12	8	24	34	26	+8		9 Ryszard Duda
1971–72		13/14	26	4	10	12	18	20	32	−12	Relegation	6 Ryszard Duda
1972–73	Second tier	12/16	30	7	13	10	27	27	33	−6		6 Janusz Krawczyk
1973–74		6/16	30	12	8	10	32	34	25	+9		12 Janusz Krawczyk
1974–75		1/16	30	15	11	4	41	44	16	+28	Promotion, won the Polish Cup	11 Zdzisław Napieracz
1975–76	Top tier	15/16	30	8	8	14	24	23	35	−12	Relegation	8 Marian Kozerski
1976–77	Second tier	14/16	30	7	12	11	26	23	40	−17	Relegation	6 Stanisław Curyło
1977–78	Third tier	2/14	26	13	5	8	31	35	22	+13		
1978–79		2/15	28	19	5	4	43	67	13	+54		
1979–80		1/15	28	21	3	4	45	47	17	+30	Promotion	
1980–81	Second tier	6/16	30	11	11	8	33	33	29	+4		7 Aleksander Siekieryn
1981–82		14/16	30	7	10	13	24	23	34	−11	Relegation	5 M. Chamielec, A. Banasik
1982–83	Third tier	2/14	26	13	12	1	38	44	16	+28		
1983–84		1/16	30	22	7	1	51	65	14	+51	Promotion	
1984–85	Second tier	13/16	30	7	12	11	26	20	31	−11	Relegation	4 Zbigniew Znojek
1985–86	Third tier	2/14	26	15	7	4	37	51	17	+34		
1986–87		1/14	26	17	6	3	47	61	15	+46	Promotion	
1987–88	Second tier	4/16	30	13	7	10	35	41	32	+9		7 S. Sroczyński, R. Kaszuba
1988–89		5/16	30	13	10	7	38	38	26	+12		8 Stanisław Sroczyński
1989–90		7/20	38	15	13	10	44	37	31	+6		7 Paweł Kloc
1990–91		15/20	38	10	15	13	35	44	50	−6		14 Robert Bąk
1991–92		3/18	34	15	13	6	43	44	28	+16		7 Zbigniew Znojek
1992–93		10/18	34	12	8	14	32	31	35	−4		11 Paweł Kloc
1993–94		16/18	34	7	14	13	28	29	34	−5	Relegation	6 Marek Kogut
1994–95	Third tier	3/18	34	17	11	6	45	55	28	+27		10 Tomasz Tułacz
1995–96		4/18	34	20	6	8	66	70	32	+38		23 Paweł Koziołek
1996–97		3/18	34	17	11	6	62	82	40	+42		26 Paweł Koziołek
1997–98		10/18	34	11	10	13	43	43	48	−5	Relegation	10 M. Omiotek, G. Musiał
1998–99	Fourth tier	1/18	34	23	8	3	77	73	15	+58	Promotion	19 Jarosław Kuter
1999–2000	Third tier	6/18	34	15	7	12	52	37	32	+5		11 Marcin Pacuła
2000–01		16/19	36	12	8	16	44	31	44	−13	Relegation	4 Jarosław Kuter
2001–02	Fourth tier	1/18	34	23	8	3	77	76	18	+58	Promotion	16 Paweł Kloc
2002–03	Third tier	3/17	32	15	8	9	53	41	33	+8		9 Łukasz Szczoczarz
2003–04		2/16	30	18	7	5	61	45	22	+23	Play-off to II league	7 P. Kloc, K. Wójcik
2004–05		4/16	30	17	5	8	56	50	31	+19		9 Krzysztof Szymański
2005–06		5/16	30	14	8	8	50	47	36	+11		17 Wojciech Fabianowski
2006–07		5/16	30	15	5	10	50	58	31	+27		13 Łukasz Szczoczarz
2007–08		10/17	32	10	10	12	40	28	34	−6	Relegation, competition reform	5 Krzysztof Szymański
2008–09	Fourth tier	2/16	30	16	8	6	56	52	25	+27	Promotion	19 Ireneusz Gryboś
2009–10	Third tier	12/18	34	11	9	14	42	47	49	−2		12 Ireneusz Gryboś
2010–11		8/18	34	12	12	10	48	55	46	+9		14 Wojciech Fabianowski
2011–12		11/17	30	9	9	12	36	31	34	−3		4 D. Florian, K. Maca, A. Prokić
2012–13		11/18	34	9	15	10	42	37	32	5		10 Andreja Prokić
2013–14		11/18 ▼	34	12	11	11	47	40	40	0	Relegation	16 Piotr Prędota
2014–15	Fourth tier	1/18	34	21	10	3	73	84	29	+55	Playoff to 2nd league	30 Piotr Prędota
2015–16		2/18	34	23	5	6	74	80	33	+47		20 Piotr Prędota
2016–17		3/18	32	20	4	8	64	70	32	+38		17 Wojciech Reiman
2017–18		6/18	34	16	7	11	55	56	40	+16		15 Wojciech Reiman
2018–19		1/18 ▲	34	22	10	2	76	87	27	+60	Promotion	20 Tomasz Płonka
2019–20	Third tier	6/18	34	15	6	13	51	55	44	+11	Play-off to II league	9 Artur Pląskowski
2020–21		10/19	36	14	8	14	50	58	60	-2		12 Wojciech Reiman
2021–22		1/18	34	23	8	3	77	75	35	+40	Promoted	11 Damian Michalik
2022–23	Second tier	6/18	34	14	9	11	51	57	44	+13	Lost the promotion play-offs	10 Damian Michalik
2023–24		11/18	34	14	6	14	48	53	60	-7		8 Adler Da Silva
2024–25		12/18	34	9	8	17	35	42	59	-17		7 Tomasz Bała
2025–26		13/18	34	12	7	15	43	49	60	-11		12 Jonathan

== See also ==
- Football in Poland
- List of football teams
- Champions' Cup/League
- UEFA Cup
