= MKP Pogoń Siedlce =

Polish football club

Pogoń Siedlce
- Full name: Miejski Klub Piłkarski; Pogoń Siedlce
- Nicknames: Biało-niebiescy (The White and Blue); Pogoniści
- Founded: 10 October 1944; 81 years ago
- Ground: ROSRRiT Stadium
- Capacity: 2,901
- Chairman: Łukasz Firus
- Manager: Adam Nocoń
- League: I liga
- 2025–26: I liga, 15th of 18
- Website: mkppogonsiedlce.pl
Home colours	Away colours	Third colours

Miejski Klub Piłkarski Pogoń Siedlce (Polish pronunciation: [ˈmjɛjskʲi ˈklup piwˈkarskʲi ˈpɔɡɔj̃ ˈɕɛdlt͡sɛ]) is a Polish football club based in Siedlce.

They currently play in the second tier after winning the 2023–24 II liga. Pogoń plays their home games at the new Municipal Stadium, which is situated on John Paul II Road in the town.

== History ==
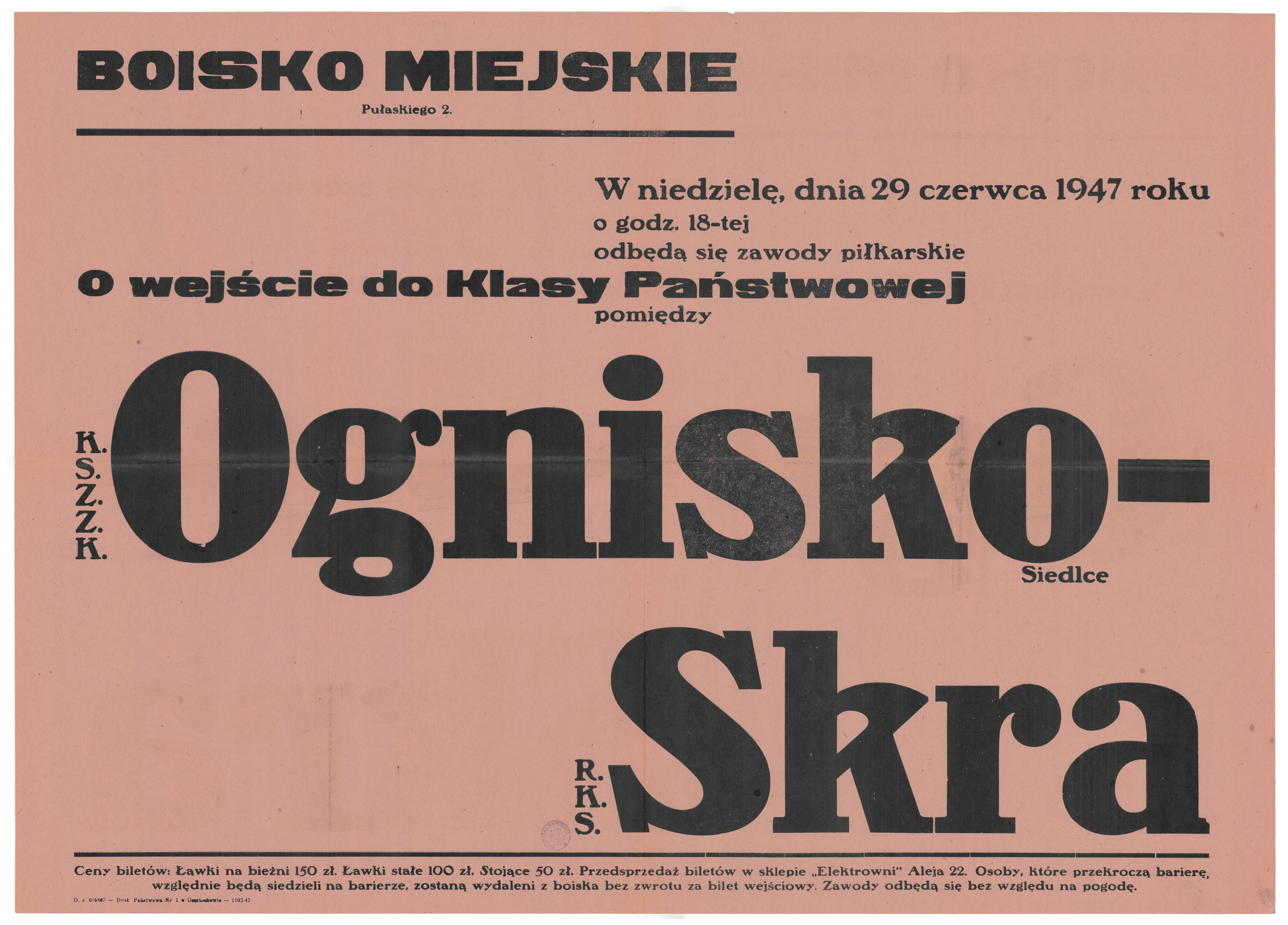
Poster advertising a 1947 Polish Football Championship game between Skra Częstochowa and Ognisko Siedlce

The club was founded in 1944 as Ognisko Siedlce after Nazi Germany's occupation of Siedlce had ended. Before the World War II, several football clubs existed in Siedlce, including Strzelec Siedlce and WKS 22. pp Siedlce, a military club having played in the Polish League from 1932 to 1934. In 1949, Ognisko was relegated from II liga. Through many years, the club had played in the regional leagues and even in III liga as Kolejarz (Railwayman) Siedlce, Start-Pogoń Siedlce and later as MKS Pogoń Siedlce. From 1991 to 1997 they played in III liga, and later in lower leagues again. In 2008 they were renamed to MKP Pogoń Siedlce and have gained promotion to III liga (fourth league level) in 2009 and later to II liga in 2011. In June 2014, they secured promotion to I liga. In 2018 Pogoń was relegated to II liga, having lost the relegation play-offs.

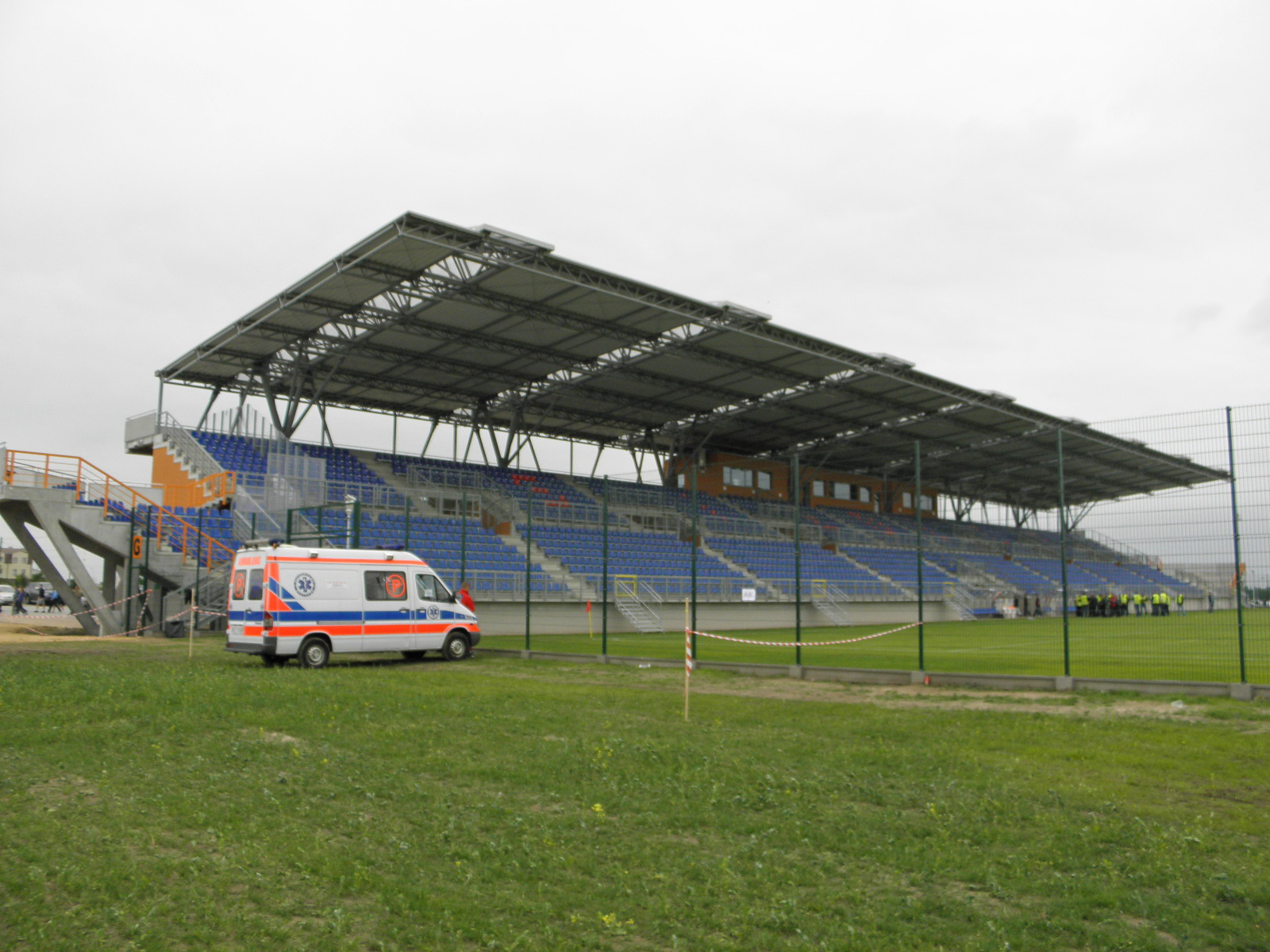
Municipal Stadium in Siedlce

On 25 May 2024, they returned to the second division after being crowned the 2023–24 II liga champions.

== Players ==
=== Current squad ===
As of 25 July 2026

Note: Flags indicate national team as defined under FIFA eligibility rules; some limited exceptions apply. Players may hold more than one non-FIFA nationality.

No.	Pos.	Nation	Player
1	GK	POL	Jakub Tomkiel
2	DF	POL	Krystian Miś
4	DF	POL	Przemysław Szur
6	MF	POL	Mateusz Kizyma
7	MF	POL	Damian Szuprytowski (captain)
8	MF	POL	Jakub Sinior
9	FW	POL	Maciej Rosołek
10	MF	POL	Rafał Makowski
14	DF	POL	Damian Jakubik
16	MF	POL	Bartłomiej Poczobut
17	MF	POL	Mateusz Marzec
19	MF	POL	Olaf Kozłowski

No.	Pos.	Nation	Player
21	FW	POL	Szymon Kobusiński
22	FW	POL	Patryk Klimek
25	DF	POL	Filip Kendzia
27	DF	POL	Jakub Barczak (on loan from Górnik Zabrze)
29	DF	POL	Łukasz Trepka (on loan from GKS Katowice)
31	DF	POL	Ernest Dzięcioł
47	MF	POL	Bolesław Świerczewski
56	MF	POL	Cezary Demianiuk
57	GK	POL	Jakub Lemanowicz
72	DF	POL	Sebastian Szczytniewski
95	MF	POL	Nikodem Zielonka
