= 2020–21 III liga =

III liga
- Season: 2020–21
- Dates: 1 August 2020 – 26 June 2021
- Champions: Pogoń Grodzisk Mazowiecki; Radunia Stężyca; Ruch Chorzów; Wisła Puławy
- Top goalscorer: (Poland) Krzysztof Bartoszak (29 goals)

The 2020–21 III liga season was the 13th edition of the fourth tier domestic division in the Polish football league system since its establishment in 2008 under its current title (III liga) and the 5th season under its current league division format.

The competition was contested by 84 clubs split geographically across 4 groups, with the winners of each group gaining promotion to the II liga. The season was played in a round-robin tournament. It began in August 2020 and ended in June 2021. The teams included semi-professional clubs (although a few are professional) and the reserve teams of professional clubs.

From October 17, 2020, due to the COVID-19 pandemic restrictions, all III liga football matches take place behind closed doors without any spectators.

== Format ==
Geographical criteria.

84 teams are divided into four groups according to geographical criteria:

- Group I (Łódź – Masovian – Podlaskie – Warmian-Masurian)
- Group II (Kuyavian-Pomeranian – Greater Poland – Pomeranian – West Pomeranian)
- Group III (Lower Silesian – Lubusz – Opole – Silesian)
- Group IV (Świętokrzyskie – Lesser Poland – Lublin – Podkarpackie)

Each group of III liga is managed by a different voivodship football association. In the 2020–21 season these are the following regionals federations:

- Group I – Łódź Football Association
- Group II – Pomeranian Football Association
- Group III – Opole Football Association
- Group IV – Świętokrzyskie Football Association

Location of teams and stadiums in 2020–21 III liga. Red: Group I, Green: Group II, Yellow: Group III, Blue: Group IV

== Changes from last season ==
The following teams have changed division since the 2019–20 season.

=== To III liga ===
Relegated from 2019–20 II liga	Promoted from 2019–20 IV liga
▼ Legionovia Legionowo ▼ Elana Toruń ▼ Gryf Wejherowo ▼ Stal Stalowa Wola	▲KS Kutno ▲ Błonianka Błonie ▲ Jagiellonia Białystok II ▲GKS Wikielec ▲ Pomorzanin Toruń ▲GKS Przodkowo ▲ Unia Swarzędz ▲ Flota Świnoujście ▲ Polonia-Stal Świdnica ▲ Warta Gorzów Wielkopolski ▲ Polonia Nysa ▲LKS Goczałkowice-Zdrój ▲KS Wiązownica ▲ ŁKS Łagów ▲ Lewart Lubartów ▲ Cracovia II

=== From III liga ===
Promoted to 2020–21 II liga	Relegated to 2020–21 IV liga	Withdrawn teams 2019–20 III liga
▲ Sokół Ostróda ▲KKS 1925 Kalisz ▲ Śląsk Wrocław II ▲ Motor Lublin ▲ Hutnik Kraków	No teams were relegated.	▼ Grom Nowy Staw ▼ Ruch Zdzieszowice ▼LZS Starowice Dolne

== League tables ==
=== Group 1 ===
III liga Group 1
- Season: 2020–21
- Dates: 8 August 2020 – 20 June 2021
- Champions: Pogoń Grodzisk Mazowiecki
- Top goalscorer: (Poland) Bartosz Giełażyn (Poland) Kamil Zalewski (27 goals each)

Pos	Team	Pld	W	D	L	GF	GA	GD	Pts	Promotion
1	Pogoń Grodzisk Mazowiecki (C, P)	35	25	2	8	84	37	+47	77	Promotion to II liga
2	Świt Nowy Dwór Mazowiecki	35	23	5	7	66	36	+30	74	
3	Legionovia Legionowo	35	19	7	9	68	48	+20	64	
4	Polonia Warsaw	35	17	8	10	63	39	+24	59	
5	Unia Skierniewice	35	15	7	13	60	50	+10	52	
6	Znicz Biała Piska	35	14	10	11	62	61	+1	52	
7	Legia Warsaw II	35	15	6	14	61	54	+7	51	
8	Jagiellonia Białystok II	35	13	5	17	57	69	−12	44	
9	KS Kutno	34	16	7	11	55	47	+8	55	
10	Ursus Warsaw	34	15	7	12	53	45	+8	52	
11	Błonianka Błonie	34	15	5	14	65	51	+14	50	
12	Lechia Tomaszów Mazowiecki	34	15	5	14	49	63	−14	50	
13	Broń Radom	34	14	7	13	46	44	+2	49	
14	Sokół Aleksandrów Łódzki	34	12	12	10	53	31	+22	48	
15	Pelikan Łowicz	34	13	8	13	47	46	+1	47	
16	GKS Wikielec	34	13	7	14	50	57	−7	46	
17	Concordia Elbląg	34	12	9	13	44	46	−2	45	Relegation to IV liga
18	RKS Radomsko	34	11	9	14	51	50	+1	42	Relegation to IV liga
19	Olimpia Zambrów	34	12	4	18	51	59	−8	40	Relegation to IV liga
20	Ruch Wysokie Mazowieckie	34	4	11	19	32	71	−39	23	Relegation to IV liga
21	Huragan Morąg	34	4	10	20	39	76	−37	22	Relegation to IV liga
22	KS Wasilków	34	4	3	27	21	97	−76	15	Relegation to IV liga

Source: 90minut.pl
Rules for classification: 1. Number of points reached in the entire series of games; 2. Number of points reached in direct matches; 3. Goal difference in direct matches; 4. Goal difference in direct matches – away goals counted twice; 5. Goal difference in the whole series of games; 6. Number of goals scored in the entire series of games.
(C) Champions; (P) Promoted

=== Group 2 ===
III liga Group 2
- Season: 2020–21
- Dates: 1 August 2020 – 26 June 2021
- Champions: Radunia Stężyca
- Top goalscorer: (Poland) Krzysztof Bartoszak (29 goals)

Pos	Team	Pld	W	D	L	GF	GA	GD	Pts	Promotion
1	Radunia Stężyca (C, P)	35	28	3	4	115	24	+91	87	Promotion to II liga
2	Świt Skolwin	35	25	6	4	75	28	+47	81	
3	Polonia Środa Wielkopolska	35	23	7	5	76	31	+45	76	
4	KP Starogard Gdański	35	19	4	12	48	46	+2	61	
5	Elana Toruń	35	15	11	9	59	33	+26	56	
6	Bałtyk Gdynia	35	13	8	14	43	52	−9	47	
7	GKS Przodkowo	35	11	7	17	42	66	−24	40	
8	Pogoń Szczecin II	35	11	6	18	61	68	−7	39	
9	Kotwica Kołobrzeg	34	16	10	8	59	40	+19	58	
10	Sokół Kleczew	34	17	6	11	63	45	+18	57	
11	Unia Janikowo	34	15	9	10	54	53	+1	54	
12	Jarota Jarocin	34	14	7	13	68	49	+19	49	
13	Bałtyk Koszalin (Note: Bałtyk Koszalin avoided relegation as Bytovia Bytów did not apply for a III liga license due to financial difficulties.)	34	13	9	12	63	56	+7	48	
14	Nielba Wągrowiec	34	13	8	13	74	59	+15	47	Relegation to IV liga
15	Flota Świnoujście	34	12	11	11	48	55	−7	47	Relegation to IV liga
16	Pomorzanin Toruń	34	11	10	13	39	40	−1	43	Relegation to IV liga
17	Unia Swarzędz	34	11	8	15	51	44	+7	41	Relegation to IV liga
18	Gwardia Koszalin	34	11	7	16	42	52	−10	40	Relegation to IV liga
19	Gryf Wejherowo	34	10	6	18	45	64	−19	36	Relegation to IV liga
20	Górnik Konin	34	7	5	22	32	76	−44	26	Relegation to IV liga
21	Chemik Police	34	4	6	24	28	96	−68	18	Relegation to IV liga
22	Mieszko Gniezno	34	0	4	30	15	123	−108	4	Relegation to IV liga

Source: 90minut.pl
Rules for classification: 1. Number of points reached in the entire series of games; 2. Number of points reached in direct matches; 3. Goal difference in direct matches; 4. Goal difference in direct matches – away goals counted twice; 5. Goal difference in the whole series of games; 6. Number of goals scored in the entire series of games.
(C) Champions; (P) Promoted

=== Group 3 ===
III liga Group 3
- Season: 2020–21
- Dates: 1 August 2020 – 19 June 2021
- Champions: Ruch Chorzów
- Top goalscorer: (Poland) Marcin Przybylski (Poland) Piotr Stępień (25 goals each)

Pos	Team	Pld	W	D	L	GF	GA	GD	Pts	Promotion
1	Ruch Chorzów (C, P)	36	30	2	4	93	30	+63	92	Promotion to II liga
2	Polonia Bytom	36	25	6	5	86	42	+44	81	
3	Ślęza Wrocław	36	23	9	4	97	38	+59	78	
4	Pniówek Pawłowice	36	20	8	8	68	45	+23	68	
5	Zagłębie Lubin II	36	18	5	13	71	43	+28	59	
6	Rekord Bielsko-Biała	36	17	7	12	71	57	+14	58	
7	LKS Goczałkowice-Zdrój	36	15	6	15	56	55	+1	51	
8	Stal Brzeg	36	13	10	13	61	54	+7	49	
9	Górnik Zabrze II	36	15	4	17	61	56	+5	49	
10	Lechia Zielona Góra	36	12	11	13	50	59	−9	47	
11	Miedź Legnica II	36	13	7	16	47	59	−12	46	
12	Gwarek Tarnowskie Góry	36	11	11	14	51	67	−16	44	
13	MKS Kluczbork	36	11	8	17	57	77	−20	41	
14	Warta Gorzów Wielkopolski	36	11	6	19	36	53	−17	39	
15	Piast Żmigród	36	9	12	15	53	56	−3	39	
16	Foto-Higiena Gać	36	8	9	19	51	87	−36	33	
17	ROW 1964 Rybnik	36	6	12	18	45	75	−30	30	Relegation to IV liga
18	Polonia Świdnica	36	7	4	25	43	101	−58	25	Relegation to IV liga
19	Polonia Nysa	36	5	9	22	42	85	−43	24	Relegation to IV liga

Source: 90minut.pl
Rules for classification: 1. Number of points reached in the entire series of games; 2. Number of points reached in direct matches; 3. Goal difference in direct matches; 4. Goal difference in direct matches – away goals counted twice; 5. Goal difference in the whole series of games; 6. Number of goals scored in the entire series of games.
(C) Champions; (P) Promoted

=== Group 4 ===
III liga Group 4
- Season: 2020–21
- Dates: 1 August 2020 – 20 June 2021
- Champions: Wisła Puławy
- Top goalscorer: (Poland) Adrian Paluchowski (28 goals)

Pos	Team	Pld	W	D	L	GF	GA	GD	Pts	Promotion
1	Wisła Puławy (C, P)	40	30	6	4	100	31	+69	96	Promotion to II liga
2	Chełmianka Chełm	40	22	7	11	70	45	+25	73	
3	Sokół Sieniawa	40	21	10	9	61	37	+24	73	
4	Stal Stalowa Wola	40	22	7	11	77	44	+33	73	
5	Avia Świdnik	40	20	10	10	88	40	+48	70	
6	Wisłoka Dębica	40	20	10	10	75	45	+30	70	
7	Podhale Nowy Targ	40	18	11	11	58	49	+9	65	
8	Wólczanka Wólka Pełkińska	40	18	8	14	74	58	+16	62	
9	KSZO Ostrowiec Świętokrzyski	40	19	4	17	63	50	+13	61	
10	Siarka Tarnobrzeg	40	17	8	15	59	53	+6	59	
11	Cracovia II	40	15	9	16	56	49	+7	54	
12	Wisła Sandomierz	40	15	9	16	53	62	−9	54	
13	ŁKS Łagów	40	14	10	16	57	62	−5	52	
14	Podlasie Biała Podlaska	40	14	6	20	60	84	−24	48	
15	Orlęta Radzyń Podlaski	40	14	5	21	58	71	−13	47	
16	Lewart Lubartów (R)	40	11	13	16	46	48	−2	46	Relegation to IV liga
17	KS Wiązownica (R)	40	13	7	20	53	81	−28	46	Relegation to IV liga
18	Korona Kielce II (R)	40	12	6	22	50	78	−28	42	Relegation to IV liga
19	Stal Kraśnik (R)	40	10	12	18	51	58	−7	42	Relegation to IV liga
20	Jutrzenka Giebułtów (R)	40	7	7	26	48	107	−59	28	Relegation to IV liga
21	Hetman Zamość (R)	40	3	5	32	35	140	−105	14	Relegation to IV liga

Updated to match(es) played on unknown. Source: 90minut.pl
Rules for classification: 1. Number of points reached in the entire series of games; 2. Number of points reached in direct matches; 3. Goal difference in direct matches; 4. Goal difference in direct matches – away goals counted twice; 5. Goal difference in the whole series of games; 6. Number of goals scored in the entire series of games.
(C) Champions; (P) Promoted; (R) Relegated

== See also ==
- 2020–21 Ekstraklasa
- 2020–21 I liga
- 2020–21 II liga
- 2020–21 Polish Cup
