= 2020–21 in Polish football =

Football in Poland
- Season: 2020–21

Men's football
- Ekstraklasa: Legia Warsaw
- I liga: Radomiak Radom
- II liga: Górnik Polkowice
- Polish Cup: Raków Częstochowa
- Polish Super Cup: Cracovia

The 2020–21 season was the 96th season of competitive football in Poland.

== Men's football ==
=== League competitions ===
==== Ekstraklasa ====
Pos	Team	Pld	W	D	L	GF	GA	GD	Pts	Qualification or relegation
1	Legia Warsaw (C)	30	19	7	4	48	24	+24	64	Qualification for the Champions League first qualifying round
2	Raków Częstochowa	30	17	8	5	46	25	+21	59	Qualification for the Europa Conference League second qualifying round (Note: Raków Częstochowa qualified for the Europa Conference League by winning the 2020–21 Polish Cup and also by finishing second in the Ekstraklasa. As a result, the berth reserved for third place was passed to the fourth-placed team from the 2020–21 Ekstraklasa.)
3	Pogoń Szczecin	30	15	7	8	36	23	+13	52	Qualification for the Europa Conference League second qualifying round
4	Śląsk Wrocław	30	11	10	9	36	32	+4	43 (Note: Head-to-head points: Śląsk Wrocław 6, Warta Poznań 0.)	Qualification for the Europa Conference League first qualifying round
5	Warta Poznań	30	13	4	13	33	32	+1	43	
6	Piast Gliwice	30	11	9	10	39	32	+7	42 (Note: Head-to-head points: Piast Gliwice 4, Lechia Gdańsk 1.)	
7	Lechia Gdańsk	30	12	6	12	40	37	+3	42	
8	Zagłębie Lubin	30	11	8	11	38	40	−2	41	
9	Jagiellonia Białystok	30	10	7	13	39	48	−9	37 (Note: Head-to-head points: Jagiellonia Białystok 9, Górnik Zabrze 5, Lech Poznań 2.)	
10	Górnik Zabrze	30	10	7	13	31	33	−2	37	
11	Lech Poznań	30	9	10	11	39	38	+1	37	
12	Wisła Płock	30	8	9	13	37	44	−7	33 (Note: Head-to-head matches: Wisła Kraków 0–3 Wisła Płock, Wisła Płock 1–3 Wisła Kraków.)	
13	Wisła Kraków	30	8	9	13	39	42	−3	33	
14	Cracovia (Note: Cracovia was deducted 5 points for match-fixing during the 2003–04 II liga season (second tier at the time).)	30	8	13	9	28	32	−4	32	
15	Stal Mielec	30	6	11	13	31	47	−16	29	
16	Podbeskidzie Bielsko-Biała (R)	30	6	7	17	29	60	−31	25	Relegation to I liga

Source: ekstraklasa.org
Rules for classification: 1) Points; 2) Head-to-head points; 3) Head-to-head goal difference; 4) Head-to-head goals scored; 5) Head-to-head away goals scored (only if between two teams); 6) Goal difference; 7) Goals scored; 8) Number of wins; 9) Number of away wins; 10) Fairplay ranking; 11) Draw
(C) Champions; (R) Relegated

==== I liga ====
Pos	Team	Pld	W	D	L	GF	GA	GD	Pts	Promotion or Relegation
1	Radomiak Radom (C, P)	34	20	8	6	49	20	+29	68	Promotion to Ekstraklasa
2	Bruk-Bet Termalica Nieciecza (P)	34	18	11	5	56	28	+28	65	Promotion to Ekstraklasa
3	GKS Tychy	34	18	9	7	49	27	+22	63	Qualification for Promotion play-offs
4	Arka Gdynia	34	17	9	8	51	32	+19	60	Qualification for Promotion play-offs
5	ŁKS Łódź	34	17	7	10	59	41	+18	58	Qualification for Promotion play-offs
6	Górnik Łęczna (O, P)	34	15	11	8	47	30	+17	56	Qualification for Promotion play-offs
7	Miedź Legnica	34	13	12	9	49	36	+13	51	
8	Odra Opole	34	13	10	11	35	41	−6	49	
9	Widzew Łódź	34	11	13	10	30	36	−6	46	
10	Sandecja Nowy Sącz	34	12	9	13	42	50	−8	45	
11	Chrobry Głogów	34	12	8	14	34	45	−11	44	
12	Korona Kielce	34	11	8	15	31	46	−15	41	
13	Puszcza Niepołomice	34	10	7	17	32	46	−14	37	
14	GKS Jastrzębie	34	10	5	19	32	48	−16	35	
15	Stomil Olsztyn	34	9	8	17	31	48	−17	35	
16	Resovia Rzeszów	34	8	8	18	27	45	−18	32	
17	Zagłębie Sosnowiec	34	8	6	20	35	43	−8	30	
18	GKS Bełchatów (Note: GKS Bełchatów was punished with a deduction of 2 points for licensing process violating.) (R)	34	6	7	21	24	51	−27	23	Relegation to II liga

Updated to match(es) played on 3 June 2021. Source: 1liga.org, 90minut.pl
Rules for classification: 1) Points; 2) Head-to-head points; 3) Head-to-head goal difference; 4) Head-to-head away goals scored (only if two teams); 5) Goal difference; 6) Goals scored; 7) Games won; 8) Away games won; 9) PZPN draw.
(C) Champions; (O) Play-off winner; (P) Promoted; (R) Relegated

==== II liga ====
Pos	Team	Pld	W	D	L	GF	GA	GD	Pts	Promotion or Relegation
1	Górnik Polkowice (C, P)	36	22	10	4	70	29	+41	76	Promotion to I liga
2	GKS Katowice (P)	36	22	4	10	67	41	+26	70	Promotion to I liga
3	Chojniczanka Chojnice	36	19	10	7	63	34	+29	67	Qualification for Promotion play-offs
4	Wigry Suwałki	36	18	10	8	51	35	+16	64	Qualification for Promotion play-offs
5	KKS 1925 Kalisz	36	17	6	13	51	40	+11	57	Qualification for Promotion play-offs
6	Skra Częstochowa (O, P)	36	15	7	14	51	42	+9	52	Qualification for Promotion play-offs
7	Garbarnia Kraków	36	14	10	12	49	50	−1	52	
8	Śląsk Wrocław II	36	15	7	14	61	57	+4	52	
9	Motor Lublin	36	12	14	10	48	44	+4	50	
10	Stal Rzeszów	36	14	8	14	58	60	−2	50	
11	Sokół Ostróda	36	14	4	18	50	56	−6	46	
12	Hutnik Kraków	36	13	6	17	47	61	−14	45	
13	Pogoń Siedlce (Note: Pogoń Siedlce was punished with a deduction of 6 points for the use of unauthorized pharmacological support, this was later reduced to 3 points.)	36	12	9	15	61	62	−1	42	
14	Lech Poznań II	36	11	7	18	47	58	−11	40	
15	Znicz Pruszków	36	10	8	18	37	55	−18	38	
16	Olimpia Elbląg	36	9	10	17	39	52	−13	37	
17	Olimpia Grudziądz (R)	36	10	6	20	42	67	−25	36	Relegation to III liga
18	Błękitni Stargard (R)	36	8	12	16	36	66	−30	36	Relegation to III liga
19	Bytovia Bytów (Note: Bytovia did not apply for III liga license due to financial difficulties, then applied for IV liga license and will be playing in IV liga Pomerania.) (R)	36	8	10	18	46	65	−19	34	Relegation to IV liga

Updated to match(es) played on 5 June 2021. Source: 90minut.pl
Rules for classification: 1) Points; 2) Head-to-head points; 3) Head-to-head goal difference; 4) Head-to-head away goals scored (only if two teams); 5) Goal difference; 6) Goals scored; 7) Games won; 8) Away games won
(C) Champions; (O) Play-off winners; (P) Promoted; (R) Relegated

==== III liga ====
===== Group 1 =====
Pos	Team	Pld	W	D	L	GF	GA	GD	Pts	Promotion
1	Pogoń Grodzisk Mazowiecki (C, P)	35	25	2	8	84	37	+47	77	Promotion to II liga
2	Świt Nowy Dwór Mazowiecki	35	23	5	7	66	36	+30	74	
3	Legionovia Legionowo	35	19	7	9	68	48	+20	64	
4	Polonia Warsaw	35	17	8	10	63	39	+24	59	
5	Unia Skierniewice	35	15	7	13	60	50	+10	52	
6	Znicz Biała Piska	35	14	10	11	62	61	+1	52	
7	Legia Warsaw II	35	15	6	14	61	54	+7	51	
8	Jagiellonia Białystok II	35	13	5	17	57	69	−12	44	
9	KS Kutno	34	16	7	11	55	47	+8	55	
10	Ursus Warsaw	34	15	7	12	53	45	+8	52	
11	Błonianka Błonie	34	15	5	14	65	51	+14	50	
12	Lechia Tomaszów Mazowiecki	34	15	5	14	49	63	−14	50	
13	Broń Radom	34	14	7	13	46	44	+2	49	
14	Sokół Aleksandrów Łódzki	34	12	12	10	53	31	+22	48	
15	Pelikan Łowicz	34	13	8	13	47	46	+1	47	
16	GKS Wikielec	34	13	7	14	50	57	−7	46	
17	Concordia Elbląg	34	12	9	13	44	46	−2	45	Relegation to IV liga
18	RKS Radomsko	34	11	9	14	51	50	+1	42	Relegation to IV liga
19	Olimpia Zambrów	34	12	4	18	51	59	−8	40	Relegation to IV liga
20	Ruch Wysokie Mazowieckie	34	4	11	19	32	71	−39	23	Relegation to IV liga
21	Huragan Morąg	34	4	10	20	39	76	−37	22	Relegation to IV liga
22	KS Wasilków	34	4	3	27	21	97	−76	15	Relegation to IV liga

Source: 90minut.pl
Rules for classification: 1. Number of points reached in the entire series of games; 2. Number of points reached in direct matches; 3. Goal difference in direct matches; 4. Goal difference in direct matches – away goals counted twice; 5. Goal difference in the whole series of games; 6. Number of goals scored in the entire series of games.
(C) Champions; (P) Promoted

===== Group 2 =====
Pos	Team	Pld	W	D	L	GF	GA	GD	Pts	Promotion
1	Radunia Stężyca (C, P)	35	28	3	4	115	24	+91	87	Promotion to II liga
2	Świt Skolwin	35	25	6	4	75	28	+47	81	
3	Polonia Środa Wielkopolska	35	23	7	5	76	31	+45	76	
4	KP Starogard Gdański	35	19	4	12	48	46	+2	61	
5	Elana Toruń	35	15	11	9	59	33	+26	56	
6	Bałtyk Gdynia	35	13	8	14	43	52	−9	47	
7	GKS Przodkowo	35	11	7	17	42	66	−24	40	
8	Pogoń Szczecin II	35	11	6	18	61	68	−7	39	
9	Kotwica Kołobrzeg	34	16	10	8	59	40	+19	58	
10	Sokół Kleczew	34	17	6	11	63	45	+18	57	
11	Unia Janikowo	34	15	9	10	54	53	+1	54	
12	Jarota Jarocin	34	14	7	13	68	49	+19	49	
13	Bałtyk Koszalin (Note: Bałtyk Koszalin avoided relegation as Bytovia Bytów did not apply for a III liga license due to financial difficulties.)	34	13	9	12	63	56	+7	48	
14	Nielba Wągrowiec	34	13	8	13	74	59	+15	47	Relegation to IV liga
15	Flota Świnoujście	34	12	11	11	48	55	−7	47	Relegation to IV liga
16	Pomorzanin Toruń	34	11	10	13	39	40	−1	43	Relegation to IV liga
17	Unia Swarzędz	34	11	8	15	51	44	+7	41	Relegation to IV liga
18	Gwardia Koszalin	34	11	7	16	42	52	−10	40	Relegation to IV liga
19	Gryf Wejherowo	34	10	6	18	45	64	−19	36	Relegation to IV liga
20	Górnik Konin	34	7	5	22	32	76	−44	26	Relegation to IV liga
21	Chemik Police	34	4	6	24	28	96	−68	18	Relegation to IV liga
22	Mieszko Gniezno	34	0	4	30	15	123	−108	4	Relegation to IV liga

Source: 90minut.pl
Rules for classification: 1. Number of points reached in the entire series of games; 2. Number of points reached in direct matches; 3. Goal difference in direct matches; 4. Goal difference in direct matches – away goals counted twice; 5. Goal difference in the whole series of games; 6. Number of goals scored in the entire series of games.
(C) Champions; (P) Promoted

===== Group 3 =====
Pos	Team	Pld	W	D	L	GF	GA	GD	Pts	Promotion
1	Ruch Chorzów (C, P)	36	30	2	4	93	30	+63	92	Promotion to II liga
2	Polonia Bytom	36	25	6	5	86	42	+44	81	
3	Ślęza Wrocław	36	23	9	4	97	38	+59	78	
4	Pniówek Pawłowice	36	20	8	8	68	45	+23	68	
5	Zagłębie Lubin II	36	18	5	13	71	43	+28	59	
6	Rekord Bielsko-Biała	36	17	7	12	71	57	+14	58	
7	LKS Goczałkowice-Zdrój	36	15	6	15	56	55	+1	51	
8	Stal Brzeg	36	13	10	13	61	54	+7	49	
9	Górnik Zabrze II	36	15	4	17	61	56	+5	49	
10	Lechia Zielona Góra	36	12	11	13	50	59	−9	47	
11	Miedź Legnica II	36	13	7	16	47	59	−12	46	
12	Gwarek Tarnowskie Góry	36	11	11	14	51	67	−16	44	
13	MKS Kluczbork	36	11	8	17	57	77	−20	41	
14	Warta Gorzów Wielkopolski	36	11	6	19	36	53	−17	39	
15	Piast Żmigród	36	9	12	15	53	56	−3	39	
16	Foto-Higiena Gać	36	8	9	19	51	87	−36	33	
17	ROW 1964 Rybnik	36	6	12	18	45	75	−30	30	Relegation to IV liga
18	Polonia Świdnica	36	7	4	25	43	101	−58	25	Relegation to IV liga
19	Polonia Nysa	36	5	9	22	42	85	−43	24	Relegation to IV liga

Source: 90minut.pl
Rules for classification: 1. Number of points reached in the entire series of games; 2. Number of points reached in direct matches; 3. Goal difference in direct matches; 4. Goal difference in direct matches – away goals counted twice; 5. Goal difference in the whole series of games; 6. Number of goals scored in the entire series of games.
(C) Champions; (P) Promoted

===== Group 4 =====
Pos	Team	Pld	W	D	L	GF	GA	GD	Pts	Promotion
1	Wisła Puławy (C, P)	40	30	6	4	100	31	+69	96	Promotion to II liga
2	Chełmianka Chełm	40	22	7	11	70	45	+25	73	
3	Sokół Sieniawa	40	21	10	9	61	37	+24	73	
4	Stal Stalowa Wola	40	22	7	11	77	44	+33	73	
5	Avia Świdnik	40	20	10	10	88	40	+48	70	
6	Wisłoka Dębica	40	20	10	10	75	45	+30	70	
7	Podhale Nowy Targ	40	18	11	11	58	49	+9	65	
8	Wólczanka Wólka Pełkińska	40	18	8	14	74	58	+16	62	
9	KSZO Ostrowiec Świętokrzyski	40	19	4	17	63	50	+13	61	
10	Siarka Tarnobrzeg	40	17	8	15	59	53	+6	59	
11	Cracovia II	40	15	9	16	56	49	+7	54	
12	Wisła Sandomierz	40	15	9	16	53	62	−9	54	
13	ŁKS Łagów	40	14	10	16	57	62	−5	52	
14	Podlasie Biała Podlaska	40	14	6	20	60	84	−24	48	
15	Orlęta Radzyń Podlaski	40	14	5	21	58	71	−13	47	
16	Lewart Lubartów (R)	40	11	13	16	46	48	−2	46	Relegation to IV liga
17	KS Wiązownica (R)	40	13	7	20	53	81	−28	46	Relegation to IV liga
18	Korona Kielce II (R)	40	12	6	22	50	78	−28	42	Relegation to IV liga
19	Stal Kraśnik (R)	40	10	12	18	51	58	−7	42	Relegation to IV liga
20	Jutrzenka Giebułtów (R)	40	7	7	26	48	107	−59	28	Relegation to IV liga
21	Hetman Zamość (R)	40	3	5	32	35	140	−105	14	Relegation to IV liga

Updated to match(es) played on unknown. Source: 90minut.pl
Rules for classification: 1. Number of points reached in the entire series of games; 2. Number of points reached in direct matches; 3. Goal difference in direct matches; 4. Goal difference in direct matches – away goals counted twice; 5. Goal difference in the whole series of games; 6. Number of goals scored in the entire series of games.
(C) Champions; (P) Promoted; (R) Relegated

=== Cup competitions ===
==== Polish Cup ====
2 May 2021
16:00 CEST (UTC+02:00)

Raków Częstochowa	2–1	Arka Gdynia
Ivi 81'; Tijanić 89'	Łączy nas piłka 90minut	Żebrowski 57'

Arena Lublin, Lublin (Note: The match was originally planned at the Stadion Energa Gdańsk in Gdańsk, but was moved due to the COVID-19 pandemic in Poland.)
Attendance: 0 (Note: Due to the COVID-19 pandemic, the match have been played behind closed doors without any spectators.)
Referee: Paweł Gil (Lublin)

==== Polish Super Cup ====
9 October 2020 (Note: Match originally scheduled to 9 August 2020, 20:00 CEST (UTC+02:00) was postponed due to COVID-19 disease detection in Legia Warsaw team.)
20:15 CEST (UTC+02:00)

Legia Warsaw	0–0	Cracovia
	Report; Report
Penalties
Antolić (penalty scored); Valencia (penalty scored); Cholewiak (penalty scored); Wszołek (penalty missed); Juranović (penalty scored)	4–5	(penalty scored) van Amersfoort; (penalty scored) Sadiković; (penalty scored) Vestenický; (penalty scored) Fiolić; (penalty scored) Dimun

Stadion Wojska Polskiego, Warsaw
Attendance: 6,475 (Note: Match have been played with "no more than 25 percent of the number of seats allocated to the public" due to the COVID-19 pandemic.)
Referee: Wojciech Myć (Lublin)

== UEFA competitions ==
=== UEFA Champions League ===
==== Qualifying phase and play-off round ====
===== First qualifying round =====
Team 1	Score	Team 2
Legia Warsaw (Poland)	1–0	(Northern Ireland) Linfield

===== Second qualifying round =====
Team 1	Score	Team 2
Legia Warsaw (Poland)	0–2 (a.e.t.)	(Cyprus) Omonia

=== UEFA Europa League ===
==== Qualifying phase and play-off round ====
===== First qualifying round =====
Team 1	Score	Team 2
Malmö FF (Sweden)	2–0	(Poland) Cracovia
Dinamo Minsk (Belarus)	0–2	(Poland) Piast Gliwice
Lech Poznań (Poland)	3–0	(Latvia) Valmiera

===== Second qualifying round =====
Team 1	Score	Team 2
Hammarby IF (Sweden)	0–3	(Poland) Lech Poznań
Piast Gliwice (Poland)	3–2	(Austria) Hartberg

===== Third qualifying round =====
Team 1	Score	Team 2
Legia Warsaw (Poland)	2–0	(Kosovo) Drita
Apollon Limassol (Cyprus)	0–5	(Poland) Lech Poznań
Copenhagen (Denmark)	3–0	(Poland) Piast Gliwice

===== Play-off round =====
Team 1	Score	Team 2
Legia Warsaw (Poland)	0–3	(Azerbaijan) Qarabağ
Charleroi (Belgium)	1–2	(Poland) Lech Poznań

==== Group stage ====
===== Group D =====
Pos	Team	Pld	W	D	L	GF	GA	GD	Pts	Qualification	RAN	BEN	STL	LCH
1	(Scotland) Rangers	6	4	2	0	13	7	+6	14	Advance to knockout phase	—	2–2	3–2	1–0
2	(Portugal) Benfica	6	3	3	0	18	9	+9	12	Advance to knockout phase	3–3	—	3–0	4–0
3	(Belgium) Standard Liège	6	1	1	4	7	14	−7	4		0–2	2–2	—	2–1
4	(Poland) Lech Poznań	6	1	0	5	6	14	−8	3		0–2	2–4	3–1	—

Source: UEFA

=== UEFA Youth League ===
==== Domestic Champions Path ====
===== First round =====
Team 1	Score	Team 2
Górnik Zabrze (Poland)	Cancelled	(Greece) PAOK

=== UEFA Women's Champions League ===
==== Qualifying rounds ====
===== First qualifying round =====
Team 1	Score	Team 2
Górnik Łęczna (Poland)	4–1	(Croatia) Split

===== Second qualifying round =====
Team 1	Score	Team 2
Górnik Łęczna (Poland)	2–1	(Cyprus) Apollon Limassol

==== Knockout phase ====
===== Round of 32 =====
Team 1	Agg.	Team 2	1st leg	2nd leg
Górnik Łęczna (Poland)	1–8	(France) Paris Saint-Germain	0–2	1–6

== National teams ==
=== Poland national football team ===
==== Friendlies ====
7 October 2020	Poland	5–1	Finland	Gdańsk
20:45 CEST (UTC+02:00)	Grosicki 9', 18', 28'; Piątek 53'; Milik 87'	Report	Niskanen 68'	Stadium: Stadion Energa Gdańsk; Attendance: 3,000; Referee: Michal Ocenáš (Slovakia)

11 November 2020	Poland	2–0	Ukraine	Chorzów
20:45 CET (UTC+01:00)	Piątek 40'; Moder 63'	Report		Stadium: Silesian Stadium; Attendance: 0 Referee: Manuel Schüttengruber (Austria)

1 June 2021	Poland	1–1	Russia	Wrocław
20:45 UTC+2	Świerczok 4'	Report	Karavayev 21'	Stadium: Stadion Wrocław; Attendance: 19,297; Referee: Marco Guida (Italy)

8 June 2021	Poland	2–2	Iceland	Poznań
18:00 UTC+2	Zieliński 34'; Świderski 88'	Report	Guðmundsson 24'; Br. Bjarnason 47'	Stadium: Municipal Stadium; Attendance: 19,614; Referee: Balazs Berke (Hungary)

==== UEFA Nations League ====
===== Group 1 =====
Pos	Team	Pld	W	D	L	GF	GA	GD	Pts	Qualification or relegation	(Italy)	(Netherlands)	(Poland)	(Bosnia and Herzegovina)
1	Italy	6	3	3	0	7	2	+5	12	Qualification for Nations League Finals	—	1–1	2–0	1–1
2	Netherlands	6	3	2	1	7	4	+3	11		0–1	—	1–0	3–1
3	Poland	6	2	1	3	6	6	0	7		0–0	1–2	—	3–0
4	Bosnia and Herzegovina (R)	6	0	2	4	3	11	−8	2	Relegation to League B	0–2	0–0	1–2	—

Source: UEFA
(R) Relegated

4 September 2020	Netherlands	1–0	Poland	Amsterdam, Netherlands
20:45 CEST (UTC+02:00)	Bergwijn 61'	Report		Stadium: Johan Cruyff Arena; Attendance: 0 (Note: Due to the COVID-19 pandemic in Europe, all matches scheduled for September 2020 were played behind closed doors.); Referee: Georgi Kabakov (Bulgaria)

7 September 2020	Bosnia and Herzegovina	1–2	Poland	Zenica, Bosnia and Herzegovina
20:45 CEST (UTC+02:00)	Hajradinović 24' (pen.)	Report	Glik 45'; Grosicki 67'	Stadium: Bilino Polje; Attendance: 0 Referee: Cüneyt Çakır (Turkey)

11 October 2020	Poland	0–0	Italy	Gdańsk
20:45 CEST (UTC+02:00)		Report		Stadium: Stadion Energa Gdańsk; Referee: José María Sánchez Martínez (Spain)

14 October 2020	Poland	3–0	Bosnia and Herzegovina	Wrocław
20:45 CEST (UTC+02:00)	Lewandowski 40', 52'; Linetty 45+1'	Report		Stadium: Stadion Miejski; Referee: Craig Pawson (England)

15 November 2020	Italy	2–0	Poland	Reggio Emilia, Italy
20:45 CET (UTC+01:00)	Jorginho 27' (pen.); Berardi 84'	Report		Stadium: Stadio Città del Tricolore; Attendance: 0 Referee: Clément Turpin (France)

18 November 2020	Poland	1–2	Netherlands	Chorzów
20:45 CET (UTC+01:00)	Jóźwiak 6'	Report	Depay 77' (pen.); Wijnaldum 84'	Stadium: Silesian Stadium; Attendance: 0 Referee: Orel Grinfeld (Israel)

==== UEFA Euro 2020 ====
===== Group E =====
Pos	Team	Pld	W	D	L	GF	GA	GD	Pts	Qualification
1	Sweden	3	2	1	0	4	2	+2	7	Advance to knockout stage
2	Spain (H)	3	1	2	0	6	1	+5	5	Advance to knockout stage
3	Slovakia	3	1	0	2	2	7	−5	3	
4	Poland	3	0	1	2	4	6	−2	1	

Source: UEFA
(H) Hosts

14 June 2021	Poland	1–2	Slovakia	Saint Petersburg, Russia
18:00 CEST (UTC+02:00) (19:00 UTC+3)	Linetty 46'	Report	Szczęsny 18' (o.g.); Škriniar 69'	Stadium: Krestovsky Stadium; Attendance: 12,862; Referee: Ovidiu Hațegan (Romania)

19 June 2021	Spain	1–1	Poland	Seville, Spain
21:00 CEST (UTC+02:00)	Morata 25'	Report	Lewandowski 54'	Stadium: La Cartuja; Attendance: 11,742; Referee: Daniele Orsato (Italy)

23 June 2021	Sweden	3–2	Poland	Saint Petersburg, Russia
18:00 CEST (UTC+02:00) (19:00 UTC+3)	Forsberg 2', 59'; Claesson 90+4'	Report	Lewandowski 61', 84'	Stadium: Krestovsky Stadium; Attendance: 14,252; Referee: Michael Oliver (England)

==== 2022 FIFA World Cup qualification ====
===== Group I =====
Pos	Team	Pld	W	D	L	GF	GA	GD	Pts	Qualification	England	Poland	Albania	Hungary	Andorra	San Marino
1	England	10	8	2	0	39	3	+36	26	Qualification for 2022 FIFA World Cup	—	2–1	5–0	1–1	4–0	5–0
2	Poland	10	6	2	2	30	11	+19	20	Advance to play-offs	1–1	—	4–1	1–2	3–0	5–0
3	Albania	10	6	0	4	12	12	0	18		0–2	0–1	—	1–0	1–0	5–0
4	Hungary	10	5	2	3	19	13	+6	17		0–4	3–3	0–1	—	2–1	4–0
5	Andorra	10	2	0	8	8	24	−16	6		0–5	1–4	0–1	1–4	—	2–0
6	San Marino	10	0	0	10	1	46	−45	0		0–10	1–7	0–2	0–3	0–3	—

Source: FIFA, UEFA
Rules for classification: Tiebreakers

25 March 2021	Hungary	3–3	Poland	Puskás Aréna, Budapest
20:45 CET (UTC+01:00)	Sallai 6'; Ád. Szalai 53'; Orbán 78'	Report (FIFA); Report (UEFA)	Piątek 60'; Jóźwiak 61'; Lewandowski 83'	Attendance: 0 Referee: Felix Brych (Germany)

28 March 2021	Poland	3–0	Andorra	Stadion Wojska Polskiego, Warsaw
20:45 CEST (UTC+02:00)	Lewandowski 30', 55'; Świderski 88'	Report (FIFA); Report (UEFA)		Attendance: 0 Referee: Erik Lambrechts (Belgium)

31 March 2021	England	2–1	Poland	Wembley Stadium, London
20:45 CEST (UTC+02:00)	Kane 19' (pen.); Maguire 85'	Report (FIFA); Report (UEFA)	Moder 58'	Attendance: 0 Referee: Björn Kuipers (Netherlands)

=== Poland national under-21 football team ===
==== 2021 UEFA European Under-21 Championship ====
===== Qualification =====
====== Group 5 ======
Pos	Team	Pld	W	D	L	GF	GA	GD	Pts	Qualification	Russia	Poland	Bulgaria	Serbia	Estonia	Latvia
1	Russia	10	7	2	1	22	4	+18	23	Final tournament	—	2–2	2–0	1–0	4–0	2−0
2	Poland	10	6	2	2	19	8	+11	20		1–0	—	1–1	1–0	4–0	3–1
3	Bulgaria	10	5	3	2	14	5	+9	18		0–0	3−0	—	0–1	3–0	1–0
4	Serbia	10	3	3	4	12	9	+3	12		0–2	1–0	1–2	—	6−0	1–1
5	Estonia	10	1	2	7	3	34	−31	5		0–5	0–6	0–4	0–0	—	2–1
6	Latvia	10	0	4	6	7	17	−10	4		1–4	0–1	0–0	2–2	1–1	—

Source: UEFA
Rules for classification: Tiebreakers

4 September 2020	Estonia	0–6	Poland	Pärnu, Estonia
18:00 CEST (UTC+02:00)		UEFA; 90minut	Bogusz 5', 59'; Klimala 16'; Kamiński 35'; Gumny 48'; Tomczyk 82'	Stadium: Pärnu Rannastaadion; Attendance: 0 Referee: Petri Viljanen (Finland)

8 September 2020	Poland	1–0	Russia	Łódź
18:00 CEST (UTC+02:00)	Dziczek 62'	UEFA; 90minut		Stadium: Stadion Widzewa; Attendance: 0 Referee: Kevin Clancy (Scotland)

9 October 2020	Serbia	1–0	Poland	Gornji Milanovac, Serbia
18:00 CEST (UTC+02:00)	Nikolić 11'	UEFA; 90minut		Stadium: Stadion Metalac; Referee: Bram Van Driessche (Belgium)

13 October 2020	Poland	1–1	Bulgaria	Gdynia
18:00 CEST (UTC+02:00)	Bida 66'	UEFA; 90minut	Dimitrov 41'	Stadium: Stadion Miejski; Referee: Allard Lindhout (Netherlands)

17 November 2020	Poland	3–1	Latvia	Łódź
17:30 CET (UTC+01:00)	Białek 48'; Kiwior 61'; Klimala 71'	UEFA; 90minut	Regža 89'	Stadium: Stadion Widzewa; Attendance: 0 Referee: Dragan Petrović (Bosnia and Herzegovina)
Note: All matches originally scheduled to be played in March 2020 were postponed due to the COVID-19 pandemic in Europe
