= Maciej Krakowiak =

Polish footballer

Personal information
- Date of birth: 7 September 1992 (age 34)
- Place of birth: Łódź, Poland
- Height: 1.89 m (6 ft 2 in)
- Position: Goalkeeper

Team information
- Current team: KKS 1925 Kalisz
- Number: 1

Youth career
- SMS Łódź
- Widzew Łódź
- –2009: MSP Szamotuły

Senior career*
Years	Team	Apps	(Gls)
2009	Górnik Konin	15	(0)
2010–2011	Polonia Nowy Tomyśl	29	(0)
2011	Sokół Kleczew	4	(0)
2011	GKS Bełchatów (ME)	10	(0)
2012–2013	Chojniczanka Chojnice	11	(0)
2013–2015	Widzew Łódź	25	(0)
2013–2014	Widzew Łódź II	14	(0)
2014	→ Odra Opole (loan)	5	(0)
2015–2016	GKS Bełchatów	16	(0)
2016–2017	Stal Rzeszów	5	(0)
2017–2020	FC Imabari	30	(0)
2020–	KKS 1925 Kalisz	170	(0)

International career
2007	Poland U16	1	(0)
2009	Poland U18	1	(0)
2011	Poland U19	1	(0)
- * Club domestic league appearances and goals as of 09:35, 31 May 2026 (UTC)

Maciej Krakowiak (born 7 September 1992) is a Polish professional footballer who plays as a goalkeeper for III liga club KKS 1925 Kalisz.

== Career statistics ==
As of match played 22 May 2026

Appearances and goals by club, season and competition
Club	Season	League			National cup (Note: Includes Polish Cup, Emperor's Cup)		Other		Total	
Club	Season	Division	Apps	Goals	Apps	Goals	Apps	Goals	Apps	Goals
Górnik Konin	2009–10	III liga, gr. C	15	0	—		—		15	0
Polonia Nowy Tomyśl	2009–10	III liga, gr. C	7	0	—		—		7	0
Polonia Nowy Tomyśl	2010–11	II liga	22	0	—		—		22	0
Polonia Nowy Tomyśl	Total		29	0	—		—		29	0
Sokół Kleczew	2010–11	IV liga	4	0	—		—		4	0
Chojniczanka Chojnice	2011–12	II liga	5	0	—		—		5	0
Chojniczanka Chojnice	2012–13	II liga	6	0	2	0	—		8	0
Chojniczanka Chojnice	Total		11	0	2	0	—		13	0
Widzew Łódź	2012–13	Ekstraklasa	4	0	—		—		4	0
Widzew Łódź	2013–14	Ekstraklasa	3	0	2	0	—		5	0
Widzew Łódź	2014–15	I liga	18	0	1	0	—		19	0
Widzew Łódź	Total		25	0	3	0	—		28	0
Widzew Łódź II	2013–14	III liga, gr. A	10	0	—		—		10	0
Odra Opole (loan)	2013–14	II liga	5	0	—		—		5	0
GKS Bełchatów	2015–16	I liga	16	0	0	0	—		16	0
Stal Rzeszów	2016–17	III liga, gr. IV	5	0	—		—		5	0
FC Imabari	2017	JFL	13	0	1	0	0	0	14	0
FC Imabari	2018	JFL	16	0	0	0	0	0	16	0
FC Imabari	2019	JFL	1	0	0	0	0	0	1	0
FC Imabari	Total		30	0	1	0	0	0	31	0
KKS 1925 Kalisz	2019–20	III liga, gr. II	0	0	—		—		0	0
KKS 1925 Kalisz	2020–21	II liga	16	0	1	0	1 (Note: Appearance(s) in II liga promotion play-offs)	0	18	0
KKS 1925 Kalisz	2021–22	II liga	24	0	2	0	—		26	0
KKS 1925 Kalisz	2022–23	II liga	33	0	3	0	—		36	0
KKS 1925 Kalisz	2023–24	II liga	33	0	0	0	2	0	35	0
KKS 1925 Kalisz	2024–25	II liga	30	0	1	0	1	0	32	0
KKS 1925 Kalisz	2025–26	II liga	30	0	0	0	—		30	0
KKS 1925 Kalisz	Total		166	0	7	0	4	0	177	0
Career total			316	0	13	0	4	0	333	0

== Honours ==
Polonia Nowy Tomyśl

- III liga Kuyavia–Pomerania – Greater Poland: 2009–10

Sokół Kleczew

- IV liga Greater Poland South: 2010–11
