= Tomasz Kowalski =

Polish footballer

Personal information
- Full name: Tomasz Kowalski
- Date of birth: 14 September 1992 (age 34)
- Place of birth: Poland
- Height: 1.77 m (5 ft 10 in)
- Position: Midfielder

Team information
- Current team: Włókniarz Zelów
- Number: 14

Youth career
- 2009–2010: UKS SMS Łódź

Senior career*
Years	Team	Apps	(Gls)
2010–2011	UKS SMS Łódź	32	(2)
2011–2013	Tur Turek	43	(4)
2012–2013	→ Jagiellonia Białystok (loan)	9	(0)
2013–2014	Widzew Łódź	6	(0)
2013–2014	Widzew Łódź II	8	(0)
2014	Arka Gdynia	9	(0)
2014	Arka Gdynia II	2	(0)
2014–2015	ŁKS Łódź	21	(3)
2015–2017	Drwęca Nowe Miasto Lubawskie	51	(4)
2017–2018	KKS 1925 Kalisz	26	(0)
2018–2019	Sokół Ostróda	21	(2)
2019–2020	Górnik Konin	15	(0)
2020–2022	Ostrovia Ostrów Wielkopolski	51	(15)
2022	Victoria Skarszew	0	(0)
2023	Ostrovia Ostrów Wielkopolski	12	(1)
2023–2024	Orkan Buczek	6	(0)
2024–	Włókniarz Zelów	25	(14)

International career
2013	Poland U20	1	(0)
- * Club domestic league appearances and goals as of 15:35, 11 July 2025 (UTC)

Tomasz Kowalski (born 14 September 1992) is a Polish footballer who plays as a midfielder for Włókniarz Zelów.

== Honours ==
Drwęca Nowe Miasto Lubawskie

- III liga, group I: 2016–17

Ostrovia Ostrów Wielkopolski

- V liga Greater Poland III: 2022–23
