= Arkadiusz Kaliszan =

Polish footballer (born 1972)

Personal information
- Date of birth: 13 November 1972 (age 53)
- Place of birth: Poznań, Poland
- Height: 1.95 m (6 ft 5 in)
- Position: Defender

Team information
- Current team: Lipno Stęszew (men & women) (manager)

Senior career*
Years	Team	Apps	(Gls)
1989–1992	Warta Poznań		
1993–1994	Roda JC	2	(0)
1994–1995	Warta Poznań		
1996–1998	Hutnik Kraków		
1998–2002	Polonia Warsaw	94	(5)
2003	Lech Poznań	19	(1)
2004	Widzew Łódź	10	(0)
2004–2006	Korona Kielce	19	(0)

International career
2000	Poland	1	(0)

Managerial career
- 2006–2007: Korona Kielce II
- 2007: Korona Kielce (caretaker)
- 2010: Mieszko Gniezno
- 2012–2015: 1920 Mosina
- 2019–: Lipno Stęszew
- 2024–: Lipno Stęszew (women)
- * Club domestic league appearances and goals

Arkadiusz Kaliszan (born 13 November 1972) is a Polish professional football manager and former player who played as a defender. He is currently in charge of the Lipno Stęszew men's and women's teams.

He also made one appearance for the Poland national team.

== Honours ==
=== Player ===
Polonia Warsaw

- Ekstraklasa: 1999–00
- Polish Cup: 2000–01
- Polish League Cup: 1999–00
- Polish Super Cup: 2000

Lech Poznań

- Polish Cup: 2003–04

Korona Kielce

- II liga: 2004–05

=== Manager ===
Lipno Stęszew

- IV liga Greater Poland: 2024–25
- V liga Greater Poland II: 2021–22
