= Astra Krotoszyn =

Polish football club

- Full name: Krotoszyński Klub Sportowy Astra Krotoszyn
- Nickname: Asterka
- Founded: 1929; 97 years ago
- Ground: Municipal Stadium
- Capacity: 2,500
- Chairman: Mariusz Ratajczak
- Manager: Leszek Krutin
- League: IV liga Greater Poland
- 2025–26: V liga Greater Poland III, 1st of 16 (promoted)
Home colours	Away colours

KKS Astra Krotoszyn is a Polish sports club from Krotoszyn, Greater Poland. Once a multi-sports club, since 2001 it has only two sections: football and volleyball.

== History ==
=== The beginning ===
The growing interest in sport in the country in the 1920s had a major impact on the international success of Astra athletes, especially Olympic gold medals of Halina Konopacka and Janusz Kusociński. In Krotoszyn the conditions were favourable: the attitude of the local authorities, the existence of a military garrison and secondary schools, the activity of the local intelligentsia, artisans and merchants. With the establishment of a municipal Astra club (meaning Star) in 1929, the town capitalised on hopes to establish durable development of sport.

The club formed several sections: swimming, athletics, football, bowling, ice skating, cycling, table tennis, tennis, boxing, motor club, volleyball, and basketball. Organized demonstrations, and later occupations, often on the occasion of various anniversaries and holidays.

Those were the years of promoting new disciplines, become familiar with the rules and principles of training. The coaches and the youth were trained, although the latter initially were not allowed to join the club at first, and later overturned under condition of parental consent. Organizational weakness stemmed from the managerial changes, which occurred eight times during the first 10 years of existence, among the CEOs and board of directors. Despite the presence of mayors, officials and traders in the management, the club suffered severe financial shortages all the time. Funds for the purchase of equipment and uniforms were raised by organizing games, theatre performances, concerts, trips to Poznań for international matches.

A competition for the club were other associations – "Gymnastic Society Sokól", Związek Strzelecki (shooting club), Bractwo Kurkowe (which later gained the support of municipal authorities). The club had survived this period. Greatest successes were in the swimming section. Their work was helped by two true sports fanatics – brothers John and Wladyslaw Szlachta. For the swimming competitions the top clubs from all around Greater Poland would arrive. Interest was also high for boxing matches, athletics and football.

=== Conflict with KS Kolejarz ===
In the tragic years of World War II, many activists and players of the club sacrificed their lives: Tadeusz Fenrych (mayor), Franciszek Dominiczak, Franciszek Hechmann, Zdzisław Klemczak, Antoni Piaczyński, Marian Drożdżyński, Stefan Kurzawski, Walerian Michalak, Wojciech Nowak, Marian Ryba, Ryszard Zeller.

After the war, activists and former players of the club reactivated the club on 30 May 1946, and the first president was mayor Stefan Zawieja. The club had following sections: football, table tennis, tennis, swimming, boxing, and chess. Then more sections were created: speedway, ice hockey and wrestling.

The first two decades after the war commenced with a rivalry with its neighbour – "KS Kolejarz", even taking the form of outright conflict between activists and players of both clubs, especially when "KS Kolejarz" did not agree to return Astra swimmers back to Astra. Meanwhile, a characteristic phenomenon had become prominent, the branding of sport through creating a union of sports associations. Therefore, Astra, which was previously an urban club, passed several membership changes, coupled with several name changes. They were: Robotniczy Klub Sportowy Orkan (1948), Gwardia (1949–53), Spójnia (1954–55), Sparta (1955–63). Belonging to a particular association carried financial guarantees, but the changes have led to changes in the boards, activists and athletes too.

Only in 1963 the conflict was revolved with Kolejarz, creating a united sport club. Finally, in 1970, the club returned to his first name – Astra. Henceforth it acted as an inter-union sports club, but the support and state of the unions was heavily varied. Therefore, gradually subsequent sections of the club had suspended operations.

=== Golden Era ===
The swimming section which existed until 1975, produced successful athletes: Urszula Janasówna, Bogdan Olszewski, Wladysław Kruślak, Czesław Robiński, Maciej Sroczyński, Czesław Płóciennik, Edward Tomczak, Jan Małecki. They were country and association record holders. The Olympian Ryszard Żugaj began his career at Astra.

Top places in the interprovincial league were achieved by the volleyball players, basketball players and boxers. In recent years Victus Astra table tennis players reached the second division, and were recently transferred to KS Krotosz. In the last decade the football team played in the third tier between 1996 and 2002, which was made possible by the substantial support of the Mechanical Equipment Factory and several other local entrepreneurs. The team consisted of many famous players: Adam Grad, Tomasz Szajkowski, Arkadiusz Żaglewski, Piotr Kasprzyk and Remigiusz Wojtczak, a few joined the ranks of other higher league clubs: Dariusz Reyer, Krzysztof Gościniak, Ryszard Tomczak. The team travelled all over the country.

=== Decline and recent events ===
Due to the continuing poor financial situation, since 1982, only three sections of the club operated: football, volleyball and table tennis, and since 2001 the two: football and volleyball. The difficult financial situation resulted in the football team's relegation to the fourth league, in which Astra languished, despite chances of promotion, but in a decisive play-off match Mieszko Gniezno proved to be better. More recently the club suffered yet another relegation.

The club's 80th anniversary, due to financial problems, will be celebrated rather modestly. 6 youth teams currently compete in the top of their leagues. The volleyball section is currently being re-activated, and the football team is hoping to re-build and gain promotion.

== Fans ==
Astra have a small but loyal fan-base, including an ultras group. Many Astra fans also sympathise with the regional powerhouse Lech Poznań. Their biggest rivals are considered to be KKS Kalisz, whereas the fans maintain friendly relations with fans of Kania Gostyń and LKS Czarnylas, and until January 2016, maintained friendly relations with Jarota Jarocin.
