= Łukasz Derbich =

Polish footballer

Personal information
- Full name: Łukasz Derbich
- Date of birth: 23 October 1983 (age 43)
- Place of birth: Pleszew, Poland
- Height: 1.87 m (6 ft 1 1/2 in)
- Position: Defender

Team information
- Current team: KKS 1925 Kalisz (caretaker)

Youth career
- Korona/Pogoń Stawiszyn

Senior career*
Years	Team	Apps	(Gls)
2004–2006	Zjednoczeni Rychwał		
2006–2008	Tur Turek	48+	(1+)
2009–2011	Cracovia	30	(0)
2010–2011	→ Ruch Chorzów (loan)	2	(0)
2011–2012	Sandecja Nowy Sącz	2	(0)
2012	Olimpia Elbląg	3	(0)
2012–2013	Radomiak Radom	47	(3)
2014	Pelikan Łowicz	14	(0)
2014	KKS 1925 Kalisz		
2015	Limanovia Limanowa	12	(0)
2015–2018	Einheit Rudolstadt	81	(4)
2018–2019	Górnik Konin	16	(0)
2019	KS Opatówek	15	(0)

Managerial career
- 2026–: KKS 1925 Kalisz (caretaker)
- * Club domestic league appearances and goals

Łukasz Derbich (born 23 October 1983) is a Polish former professional footballer who played as a defender. He is currently the caretaker manager of III liga club KKS 1925 Kalisz.

== Career ==
Derbich was released from Cracovia on 16 June 2011.

In July 2011, he joined Sandecja Nowy Sącz on a one-year contract.

== Managerial statistics ==
As of match played 10 October 2026

Managerial record by team and tenure
Team	From	To	Record							
Team	From	To	G	W	D	L	GF	GA	GD	Win %
KKS 1925 Kalisz (caretaker)	5 October 2026	Present	1	0	0	1	2	4	−2	0.00
Total			1	0	0	1	2	4	−2	0.00
