= Łukasz Żegleń =

Polish footballer (born 1995)

Personal information
- Full name: Łukasz Żegleń
- Date of birth: 9 June 1995 (age 31)
- Place of birth: Opole, Poland
- Height: 1.85 m (6 ft 1 in)
- Position: Striker

Team information
- Current team: Orkan Jarosławiec
- Number: 23

Youth career
- –2008: TOR Dobrzeń Wielki
- 2008–2013: Gwarek Zabrze

Senior career*
Years	Team	Apps	(Gls)
2013–2014	Podbeskidzie Bielsko-Biała	5	(1)
2014	Stal Mielec	13	(3)
2015	Odra Opole	12	(1)
2015–2016	Stal Mielec	25	(1)
2016–2017	Stal Brzeg	30	(9)
2017–2019	KKS Kalisz	26	(7)
2018–2019	→ Stal Brzeg (loan)	9	(1)
2019	Stal Brzeg	12	(1)
2019–2020	Polonia Środa Wielkopolska	23	(2)
2023–	Orkan Jarosławiec	24	(2)

International career
2011	Poland U16	2	(0)
2012	Poland U17	3	(0)
- * Club domestic league appearances and goals as of 21 June 2025

Łukasz Żegleń (born 9 June 1995) is a Polish professional footballer who plays as a striker for V liga Greater Poland club Orkan Jarosławiec.

== Career ==
Żegleń made his debut in the Polish Ekstraklasa at 27 July 2013 in a 1–2 home defeat against Górnik Zabrze. He entered the field at half-time as substitute for Kamil Kurowski, and scored in the 70th minute.

== Honours ==
Stal Mielec

- II liga: 2015–16

Stal Brzeg

- Polish Cup (Opole regionals): 2018–19

Orkan Jarosławiec

- Klasa A Greater Poland IV: 2023–24
