= Adrian Cierpka =

Polish footballer (born 1995)

Personal information
- Date of birth: 6 January 1995 (age 31)
- Place of birth: Ostrów Wielkopolski, Poland
- Height: 1.84 m (6 ft 0 in)
- Position: Midfielder

Team information
- Current team: Pogoń Nowe Skalmierzyce

Youth career
- –2008: KUKS Zębców
- 2008–2013: Lech Poznań

Senior career*
Years	Team	Apps	(Gls)
2013–2017	Miedź Legnica	82	(1)
2017	→ Wisła Puławy (loan)	3	(0)
2017–2019	Warta Poznań	62	(9)
2020–2021	Górnik Łęczna	45	(3)
2021–2022	Mioveni	10	(0)
2022–2023	Concordia Chiajna	13	(2)
2023–2026	KKS 1925 Kalisz	81	(2)
2026–	Pogoń Nowe Skalmierzyce	0	(0)

International career
2011–2012	Poland U17	10	(3)
- * Club domestic league appearances and goals as of 09:33, 31 May 2026 (UTC)

Adrian Cierpka (born 6 January 1995) is a Polish professional footballer who plays as a midfielder for IV liga Greater Poland club Pogoń Nowe Skalmierzyce. In his career, Cierpka also played for teams such as Miedź Legnica, Warta Poznań or Górnik Łęczna, among others.

== Honours ==
Górnik Łęczna

- II liga: 2019–20
