= Jerzy Kasalik =

Polish footballer (born 1949)

Personal information
- Date of birth: 10 September 1949 (age 77)
- Place of birth: Lipiny, Poland
- Height: 1.74 m (5 ft 9 in)
- Position: Forward

Youth career
- 1961–1967: Hutnik Kraków

Senior career*
Years	Team	Apps	(Gls)
1967–1968	Hutnik Kraków		
1968–1969	Legia Warsaw	1	(0)
1969–1970	Śląsk Wrocław	7	(0)
1970–1971	Hutnik Kraków		
1971–1975	ŁKS Łódź	97	(16)
1975–1976	Lechia Gdańsk		
1976–1982	Lech Poznań	118	(15)
1982–1986	Nykvarns SK		

International career
1974	Poland	3	(1)

Managerial career
- 1982–1986: Nykvarns SK (player-manager)
- 1987: Lech Poznań
- 1993–1994: Pogoń Szczecin
- 1995: Olimpia Poznań
- 1995–1997: Hutnik Kraków
- 1997: Śląsk Wrocław
- 1998: Aluminium Konin
- 1999: Petrochemia Płock
- 1999: Dyskobolia Grodzisk Wielkopolski
- 2002–2003: Aluminium Konin
- 2003–2004: Widzew Łódź
- 2006: ŁKS Łódź
- 2006–2007: Mieszko Gniezno
- * Club domestic league appearances and goals

Jerzy Kasalik (born 10 September 1949) is a Polish former football manager and player who played as a forward.

He made three appearances for the Poland national team in 1974.
