= Tomasz Kos =

Polish footballer (born 1974)

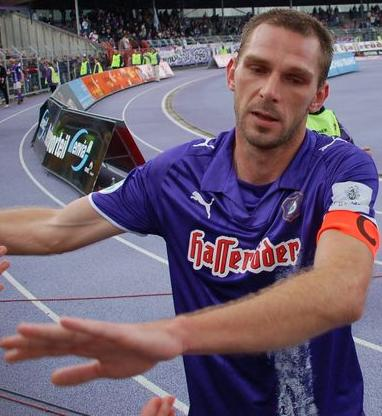

Personal information
- Date of birth: 4 April 1974 (age 52)
- Place of birth: Koło, Poland
- Height: 1.90 m (6 ft 3 in)
- Position: Defender

Youth career
- Olimpia Koło

Senior career*
Years	Team	Apps	(Gls)
1993–1994	Sokół Pniewy	2	(0)
1994–1996	Sokół Tychy	62	(6)
1996–1999	ŁKS Łódź	78	(1)
1999	FC Gütersloh	14	(1)
1999–2004	1. FC Nürnberg	102	(1)
2004–2011	Erzgebirge Aue	198	(3)
Total		456	(12)

International career
2000–2002	Poland	3	(0)
- * Club domestic league appearances and goals

Tomasz Kos (born 4 April 1974) is a Polish former professional footballer who spent most of his career playing as a defender for German clubs 1. FC Nürnberg and Erzgebirge Aue.

== Honours ==
ŁKS Łódź

- Ekstraklasa: 1997–98
