= Adam Topolski =

Polish footballer

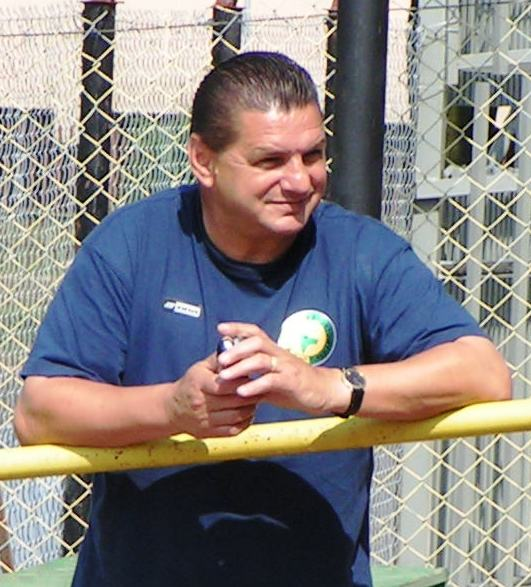

Personal information
- Full name: Adam Szczepan Topolski
- Date of birth: 25 December 1951 (age 74)
- Place of birth: Witkowo, Poland
- Height: 5 ft 10 in (1.78 m)
- Position: Defender

Youth career
- 1964–1969: Vitcovia Witkowo

Senior career*
Years	Team	Apps	(Gls)
1969	Warta Poznań		
1969–1973	Górnik Konin		
1973–1981	Legia Warsaw	239	(17)
1982–1986	Pittsburgh Spirit (indoor)	170	(41)
1986–1988	Los Angeles Lazers (indoor)	40	(13)

Managerial career
- 1988–1989: Pogoń Słupca
- 1989–1991: Górnik Konin
- 1991–1992: Zawisza Bydgoszcz
- 1993–1994: Sokół Pniewy
- 1996–1997: Zagłębie Lubin
- 1997–1998: KSZO Ostrowiec Świętokrzyski
- 1998–1999: Lech Poznań
- 1999–2000: Petrochemia Płock
- 2000: ŁKS Łódź
- 2000–2001: Lech Poznań
- 2003: Zagłębie Lubin
- 2006–2008: Tur Turek
- 2008–2009: Unia Swarzędz
- 2009–2010: GKP Gorzów Wielkopolski
- 2010: Sokół Kleczew
- 2011: Pogoń Barlinek
- 2011: Zawisza Bydgoszcz
- 2011–2012: Bałtyk Gdynia
- 2012–2015: Victoria Września
- 2015: Sokół Kleczew
- 2016: LKS Ślesin
- 2017: Unia Janikowo
- 2018–2020: Błękitni Stargard
- 2021: Błękitni Stargard
- * Club domestic league appearances and goals

Adam Szczepan Topolski (born 25 December 1951) is a Polish professional football manager and former player who played as a defender in Poland and the United States. Since his retirement in 1988, he has amassed a considerable resume as a coach in Poland.

== Career ==
In 1964, Topolski signed with the local Vitcovia Witkowo. In 1969, he played briefly for Warta Poznań before moving to Górnik Konin where he played from 1969 to 1973. That year, he moved to Legia Warsaw. In 1982, Topolski left Poland for the United States where he signed with the Pittsburgh Spirit of the Major Indoor Soccer League. After the Spirit folded in 1986, the Los Angeles Lazers signed Topolski on 17 June that year. He played two seasons in Los Angeles before retiring and returning to Poland where he became a coach. Over twenty years, Topolski has coached over a dozen teams, most for a single season.

== Honours ==
=== Player ===
Legia Warsaw

- Polish Cup: 1972–73, 1979–80, 1980–81

=== Manager ===
Tur Turek

- III liga, group II: 2006–07
- Polish Cup (Konin regionals): 2006–07

Victoria Września

- IV liga Greater Poland South: 2013–14
