= Mateusz Kwiatkowski =

Polish footballer

Personal information
- Full name: Mateusz Kwiatkowski
- Date of birth: 23 November 1992 (age 33)
- Place of birth: Szczecinek, Poland
- Height: 1.67 m (5 ft 5 1/2 in)
- Position: Forward

Team information
- Current team: Dąb Dębno
- Number: 10

Youth career
- 1999–2005: UKS 7 Szczecinek

Senior career*
Years	Team	Apps	(Gls)
2005–2009	Wielim Szczecinek		
2009–2010	Bałtyk Koszalin		
2010–2016	Ruch Chorzów	16	(1)
2014–2015	Ruch Chorzów II	28	(7)
2015–2018	Legionovia Legionowo	44	(4)
2018	Stilon Gorzów Wielkopolski	13	(5)
2018–2019	Błękitni Stargard	27	(5)
2019–2022	Świt Nowy Dwór Mazowiecki	52	(4)
2022–	Dąb Dębno	75	(12)
- * Club domestic league appearances and goals as of 17:36, 24 June 2025 (UTC)

Mateusz Kwiatkowski (born 23 November 1992) is a Polish professional footballer who plays as a forward for IV liga West Pomerania club Dąb Dębno.

== Honours ==
Dąb Dębno

- Regional league West Pomerania II: 2023–24
