= List of football clubs in Poland =

This is a list of association football clubs located in Poland, sorted by league and division within the Polish football league system, as of the 2025–26 season.

== Ekstraklasa (top tier) ==
Team	City	Stadium	Capacity	2024–25 season
Arka Gdynia	Gdynia	Stadion GOSiR	15,139	1st in I liga
Bruk-Bet Termalica Nieciecza	Nieciecza	Stadion Bruk-Bet	4,666	2nd in I liga
Cracovia	Kraków	Józef Piłsudski Cracovia Stadium	15,016	6th
GKS Katowice	Katowice	Arena Katowice	15,048	8th
Górnik Zabrze	Zabrze	Ernest Pohl Stadium	24,563	9th
Jagiellonia Białystok	Białystok	Chorten Arena	22,372	3rd
Korona Kielce	Kielce	EXBUD Arena	15,550	11th
Lech Poznań	Poznań	Enea Stadion	42,837	1st
Lechia Gdańsk	Gdańsk	Polsat Plus Arena Gdańsk	43,615	14th
Legia Warsaw	Warsaw	Polish Army Stadium	31,103	5th
Motor Lublin	Lublin	Arena Lublin	15,400	7th
Piast Gliwice	Gliwice	Piotr Wieczorek Stadium	9,913	10th
Pogoń Szczecin	Szczecin	Florian Krygier Stadium	21,163	4th
Radomiak Radom	Radom	Czachor Brothers Stadium	8,840	12th
Raków Częstochowa	Częstochowa	Raków Municipal Stadium	5,500	2nd
Widzew Łódź	Łódź	Widzew Łódź Stadium	18,018	13th
Wisła Płock	Płock	Kazimierz Górski Orlen Stadium	15,004	3rd in I liga (play-off winner)
Zagłębie Lubin	Lubin	KGHM Zagłebie Arena	16,086	15th

== I liga (second tier) ==
Team	Location	Venue	Capacity	2024–25 season
Chrobry Głogów	Głogów	GOS Stadium	2,817	13th
GKS Tychy	Tychy	Tychy Stadium	15,150	7th
Górnik Łęczna	Łęczna	Górnik Łęczna Stadium	7,464	9th
ŁKS Łódź	Łódź	Władysław Król Stadium	18,029	11th
Miedź Legnica	Legnica	White Eagle Stadium	6,864	5th
Odra Opole	Opole	Itaka Arena	11,600	14th
Pogoń Siedlce	Siedlce	ROSRRiT Stadium	2,901	15th
Pogoń Grodzisk Mazowiecki	Grodzisk Mazowiecki	Municipal Sports Stadium	1,000	2nd in II liga
Polonia Bytom	Bytom	Polonia Bytom Stadium	2,220	1st in II liga
Polonia Warsaw	Warsaw	Kazimierz Sosnkowski Stadium	7,150	6th
Puszcza Niepołomice	Niepołomice	Niepołomice Municipal Stadium	2,000	18th in 2024–25
Ruch Chorzów	Chorzów	Silesian Stadium	54,378	10th
Stal Rzeszów	Rzeszów	Stal Stadium	11,547	12th
Stal Mielec	Mielec	Grzegorz Lato Stadium	6,864	16th in 2024–25
Śląsk Wrocław	Wrocław	Tarczyński Arena	42,771	17th in 2024–25
Wieczysta Kraków	Kraków	ArcelorMittal Park	11,600	3rd in II liga (play-off winner)
Wisła Kraków	Kraków	Henryk Reyman Stadium	33,326	4th
Znicz Pruszków	Pruszków	MZOS Stadium	1,977	8th

== II liga (third tier) ==
Team	Location	Venue	Capacity	2024–25 season
Chojniczanka Chojnice	Chojnice	Chojniczanka 1930 Municipal Stadium	3,500	4th
GKS Jastrzębie	Jastrzębie-Zdrój	Jastrzębie-Zdrój Municipal Stadium	5,650	11th
Hutnik Kraków	Kraków	Suche Stawy Stadium	6,000	8th
KKS 1925 Kalisz	Kalisz	OSRiR Stadium	8,166	6th
ŁKS Łódź II	Łódź	Władysław Król Stadium	18,029	12th
Olimpia Grudziądz	Grudziądz	Bronisław Malinowski Stadium	5,323	14th
Podbeskidzie Bielsko-Biała	Bielsko-Biała	BBOSiR Stadium	15,076	7th
Podhale Nowy Targ	Nowy Targ	Józef Piłsudski Municipal Stadium	900	2nd in III liga, group IV (play-off winner)
Rekord Bielsko-Biała	Bielsko-Biała	Centrum Sportu REKORD	2,000	13th
Resovia Rzeszów	Rzeszów	Stal Stadium	11,547	10th
Sandecja Nowy Sącz	Nowy Sącz	Sandecja Stadium	8,111	1st in III liga, group IV
Sokół Kleczew	Kleczew	OSiR Stadium	800	1st in III liga, group II
Stal Stalowa Wola	Stalowa Wola	Subcarpathian Football Center	3,764	18th in I liga
Śląsk Wrocław II	Wrocław	Stadion Oporowska	8,346	1st in III liga, group III
Unia Skierniewice	Skierniewice	Municipal Stadium	3,000	1st in III liga, group I
Warta Poznań	Poznań	Warta Poznań Stadium	2,813	17th in I liga
Świt Szczecin	Szczecin	Obiekt Sportowy Skolwin	625	5th
Zagłębie Sosnowiec	Sosnowiec	ArcelorMittal Park	11,600	9th
