= Kamil Kurowski =

Polish footballer

Personal information
- Full name: Kamil Kurowski
- Date of birth: 4 September 1994 (age 32)
- Place of birth: Nowy Sącz, Poland
- Height: 1.71 m (5 ft 7 in)
- Position: Attacking midfielder

Team information
- Current team: Unia Solec Kujawski
- Number: 8

Youth career
- Gród Podegrodzie
- –2012: Legia Warsaw

Senior career*
| Years | Team | Apps | (Gls) |
| 2012–2015 | Legia Warsaw II | 26 | (2) |
| 2013–2015 | Legia Warsaw | 0 | (0) |
| 2013 | → Kolejarz Stróże (loan) | 12 | (2) |
| 2013 | → Podbeskidzie (loan) | 3 | (0) |
| 2013 | → Podbeskidzie II (loan) | 9 | (4) |
| 2015–2018 | Olimpia Grudziądz | 89 | (5) |
| 2018–2019 | GKS Katowice | 9 | (0) |
| 2019 | → Rozwój Katowice (loan) | 11 | (0) |
| 2020–2021 | Legia Warsaw II | 29 | (1) |
| 2021–2022 | Sokół Ostróda | 25 | (1) |
| 2022–2024 | Olimpia Grudziądz | 54 | (6) |
| 2024 | Tłuchowia Tłuchowo | 13 | (3) |
| 2026– | Unia Solec Kujawski | 18 | (2) |
- * Club domestic league appearances and goals as of 12:59, 8 September 2026 (UTC)

Kamil Kurowski (born 4 September 1994) is a Polish professional footballer who plays as an attacking midfielder for IV liga Kuyavia-Pomerania club Unia Solec Kujawski.

== Career ==
Kurowski is a youth exponent from Legia Warsaw. He made 12 appearances for Kolejarz Stróże in the I liga during the 2012–13 season. He made his debut in the Polish Ekstraklasa at 27 July 2013 in a 1–2 home defeat against Górnik Zabrze. He was substituted at half-time for Łukasz Żegleń.

In March 2020, Kurowski returned to Legia, this time to play for their reserve team in the III liga. He left the club in July 2021.

== Honours ==
Olimpia Grudziądz

- III liga, group II: 2022–23
