= Radomiak Radom II =

Association football club in Poland

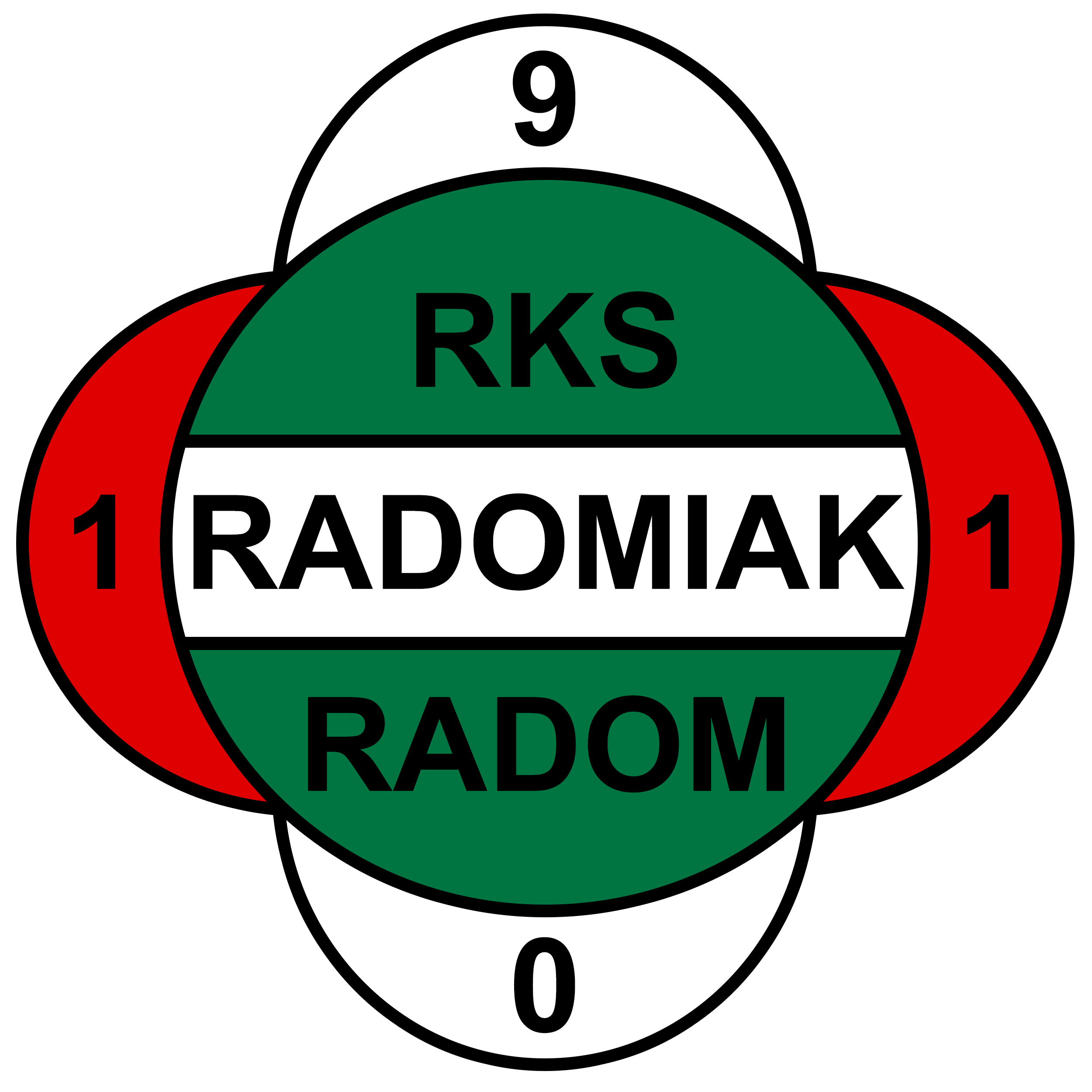
- Full name: Radomiak Spółka Akcyjna
- Nickname: Zieloni (The Greens)
- Founded: 1955; 71 years ago
- Ground: Stadion im. Braci Czachorów
- Capacity: 8,840
- Chairman: Sławomir Stempniewski
- Manager: Kacper Czernicki
- League: V liga Masovia II
- 2025–26: Regional league Radom, 2nd of 16 (promoted)
- Website: rksradomiak.pl
Home colours	Away colours

Radomiak Radom II is a Polish football team, which serves as the reserve side of Radomiak Radom. It was founded in 1955. The team's greatest achievement is a tenth-place finish in the third division in 1984.

== History ==
The team participated in the 1984–85 edition of the Polish Cup. In the first round, they defeated Gwardia Chełm 3–0 and suffered a 0–1 loss in the following round against Avia Świdnik. It was their best performance in the Polish Cup; they had played twice before and were eliminated after the first game; in 1978, after a 0–4 defeat to Orion Niedrzwica Duża and 1984, drawing 2–2 and losing 2–4 on penalties against Prokocim Kraków.

== Honours ==
From the 2001–02 season onwards

- Regional league Radom
  - Champions: 2017–18, 2022–23
  - Runners-up: 2004–05, 2025–26
- Klasa A Radom I
  - Champions: 2003–04, 2012–13
- Klasa B Radom II
  - Champions: 2009–10
- Polish Cup (Radom regionals)
  - Winners: 1983–84, 2013–14
  - Runners-up: 2021–22
