= Ryszard Jankowski =

Polish footballer

Personal information
- Date of birth: 10 April 1960 (age 66)
- Place of birth: Poznań, Poland
- Height: 1.93 m (6 ft 4 in)
- Position: Goalkeeper

Youth career
- 1973–1979: Warta Poznań

Senior career*
Years	Team	Apps	(Gls)
1979–1983	Warta Poznań		
1983–1990	Lech Poznań	82	(0)
1991–1995	Trelleborgs FF	112	(0)
1995	Pogoń Szczecin	0	(0)
1996	Górnik Konin	5	(0)

International career
1988	Poland	2	(0)

Managerial career
- 1996–1998: Lech Poznań (assistant)
- 2003: Aluminium Konin
- 2003–2004: Biały Orzeł Koźmin
- Kania Gostyń
- Rawia Rawicz
- 2006: Jagiellonia Białystok (goalkeeping coach)
- 2006–2007: Wisła Kraków (goalkeeping coach)
- 2007–2008: Dyskobolia Grodzisk (goalkeeping coach)
- 2008–2009: Polonia Warsaw (goalkeeping coach)
- 2009–2013: Jagiellonia Białystok (goalkeeping coach)
- 2013–2014: Zagłębie Lubin (goalkeeping coach)
- 2016–2017: GKS Tychy (assistant)
- 2019–2021: Kotwica Kołobrzeg (goalkeeping coach)
- * Club domestic league appearances and goals

Ryszard Jankowski (born 10 April 1960) is a Polish football manager, goalkeeping coach and former player who played as a goalkeeper. He spent most of his career in Lech Poznań, but also played for Trelleborgs FF in the Swedish Allsvenskan. After the 1995–96 season, he ended his playing career.

== Honours ==
Lech Poznań

- Ekstraklasa: 1989–90
- Polish Cup: 1983–84, 1987–88
- Polish Super Cup: 1990
