= KKS 1925 Kalisz =

Polish football club

- Full name: Kaliski Klub Sportowy; 1925 Kalisz
- Nickname: Cebulorz
- Founded: 1925; 101 years ago 1992; 34 years ago (first reformation); 2005; 21 years ago (second reformation)
- Ground: Stadion Miejski
- Capacity: 8,166
- Chairman: Andrzej Machlański
- Manager: Łukasz Derbich (caretaker)
- League: III liga, group II
- 2025–26: II liga, 16th of 18 (relegated)
- Website: https://kkskalisz.com
Home colours	Away colours	Third colours

Kaliski Klub Sportowy 1925 Kalisz, often shortened to just KKS Kalisz, historically in the past named KKS Włókniarz 1925 Kalisz and Włókniarz Kalisz, is a Polish football club based in Kalisz. As of the 2026–27 season, the men's senior team competes in group II of the III liga. The club also runs women's football and swimming sections.

== History ==
Former, short-lived club crest used during an unsuccessful attempt at a redesign in 2024

The club has had a long history, majority of it spent in amateur or semi-professional divisions. The original club was founded in 1925 as Kaliski Klub Sportowy Kalisz.

In December 1948, a merger of 7 local clubs from the local textile industry created a new club, which was eventually renamed in February 1950 as Włókienniczy Związkowy Klub Sportowy Włókniarz Kalisz.

After the dissolution of the Eastern Bloc, a dire financial situation caused the club to be liquidated on the 6 March 1992, and many sections of the club ceased to exist. The football section of the club was reformed under the name Wistil in 1991, shortly before its official disbandment, and quickly returned to the name KKS Kalisz after disbandment of the original club.

With lack of on-field successes and failure to climb the league pyramid, the club withdrew half through the III liga in the 2002–03 season, officially disbanding in March 2003. The club reformed under the name KKS Prosna Kalisz but failed to field a senior team. The fans and management of the club decided to re-establish the club from scratch in 2006, starting from the bottom of the football pyramid, the 8th tier (klasa B), and earned promotion in their first season. In that decision, they also decided to establish a women's football team.

They reached the Polish Cup semi-finals in 2023, eliminating Ekstraklasa teams such as Widzew Łódź, Górnik Zabrze and Śląsk Wrocław, before losing to Legia Warsaw. In the 2023–24 season, KKS 1925 failed to secure promotion to the I liga despite finishing in a commendable third place, as they lost 1–2 to Stal Stalowa Wola in the play-off final.

== Past seasons ==
Season	League	Place	W	D	L	GF	GA	Pts	Polish Cup
2006–07	Klasa B (VIII)	2	22	1	2	92	26	67	Did not qualify
2007–08	Klasa A (VII)	1	16	6	4	75	27	54	Did not qualify
2008–09	Liga okręgowa (VI)	3	21	3	6	74	27	66	Did not qualify
2009–10	Liga okręgowa (VI)	8	14	3	13	47	42	45	Did not qualify
2010–11	Liga okręgowa (VI)	2	19	5	6	54	33	62	Did not qualify
2011–12	Liga okręgowa (VI)	1	23	6	1	83	22	75	Did not qualify
2012–13	IV liga (V)	7	13	9	8	47	33	48	Did not qualify
2013–14	IV liga (V)	6	13	6	11	47	31	45	Did not qualify
2014–15	IV liga (V)	1	22	5	3	72	26	71	Did not qualify
2015–16	III liga (IV)	8	13	6	11	41	41	45	Preliminary round
2016–17	III liga (IV)	8	16	6	12	44	44	54	Round of 32
2017–18	III liga (IV)	5	19	6	9	52	33	63	Did not qualify
2018–19	III liga (IV)	2	21	6	7	70	37	69	Did not qualify
2019–20	III liga (IV)	1	14	3	1	41	12	45	Did not qualify
2020–21	II liga (III)	5	17	6	13	51	40	57	Round of 64
2021–22	II liga (III)	13	13	3	18	43	48	42	Round of 32
2022–23	II liga (III)	7	15	9	10	63	45	54	Semifinal
2023–24	II liga (III)	3	15	10	9	48	32	55	Round of 64
2024–25	II liga (III)	6	15	6	13	37	38	51	Preliminary round
2025–26	II liga (III)	16	8	10	16	37	55	34	Preliminary round
Green marks a season followed by promotion, red a season followed by relegation.

== Supporters and rivalries ==
The club has a relatively large fan-base considering its lack of on-field achievements and lowly league position throughout its history. The ultras number from 150–1000 for matches depending on the rival. The fans have however place a strong emphasis of the hooligan element of support.

The fan movement started in the 90's as a local Widzew Łódź fan-club. They established friendly relations with Ceramika Opoczno in 1995, which lasted until 2000. Also in 1995 the fans established friendly relations with Chrobry Głogów. However, during a match between Chrobry Głogów and Górnik Wałbrzych, huge fight erupted between Widzew and KKS fans, which resulted in KKS no longer being a Widzew fan-club. The friendship with Chrobry lasted until 2007. In the past there were friendly contacts with Pogoń Zduńska Wola and Warta Sieradz fans. Currently the fans have friendly contacts with Widzew Łódź (now as a separate entity not a fan-club), Elana Toruń, and Italian fans of Como.

The club has two large rivals: Górnik Konin and Ostrovia Ostrów Wielkopolski. Both rivals sympathise with regional powerhouse Lech Poznań, KKS being one of the very few lower league teams in Greater Poland not to do so. Fans frequently shout Autonomia Kaliska! ("Kaliszan Autonomy!"), referring for autonomy from the Greater Poland region. In turn, their rivals respond with Wielkopolska bez Kalisza! ("Greater Poland without Kalisz!"). As a result of this KKS have rivalries with many other teams in the region who also sympathise with Lech, such as Kania Gostyń, Astra Krotoszyn, Jarota Jarocin, Pogoń Nowe Skalmierzyce, Polonia Kępno and Victoria Września. With regards to Lech itself, due to large discrepancy in divisions it has extended to only the reserve team and an off-field rivalry with the local Lech fan-club. They also have a strong rivalry with the other Poznań club Warta Poznań.

== Players ==
=== Current squad ===
As of 14 March 2026

Note: Flags indicate national team as defined under FIFA eligibility rules; some limited exceptions apply. Players may hold more than one non-FIFA nationality.

No.	Pos.	Nation	Player
1	GK	POL	Maciej Krakowiak
4	DF	POL	Mateusz Wypych
5	DF	POL	Jakub Staszak
6	MF	POL	Adrian Cierpka
7	FW	POL	Jakub Jeleń (on loan from Górnik Zabrze II)
8	MF	POL	Mateusz Andruszko
9	MF	POL	Kacper Flisiuk
10	MF	POL	Karol Danielak
11	MF	JPN	Tōki Hirosawa (on loan from Jagiellonia Białystok)
12	GK	POL	Hubert Idasiak (on loan from ŁKS Łódź)
13	MF	POL	Jakub Raniś
14	MF	POL	Wiktor Sobieraj
16	MF	POL	Bartłomiej Putno
17	MF	POL	Paweł Mocny

No.	Pos.	Nation	Player
19	MF	POL	Jakub Paszkowski
20	MF	POL	Kacper Janiak
21	DF	POL	Jan Flak
22	DF	POL	Krystian Derkacz
23	DF	POL	Maciej Białczyk
27	FW	POL	Maksymilian Sterniczuk
30	DF	POL	Marcin Grabowski
33	DF	POL	Dawid Szwiec (on loan from Górnik Zabrze)
35	DF	POL	Bartosz Kieliba (captain)
37	MF	POL	Nikodem Zawistowski
59	FW	POL	Przemysław Zdybowicz
71	MF	POL	Patryk Banasiak
80	MF	POL	Kamil Kort
—	GK	POL	Maksymilian Ciołek

=== Out on loan ===
Note: Flags indicate national team as defined under FIFA eligibility rules; some limited exceptions apply. Players may hold more than one non-FIFA nationality.

No.	Pos.	Nation	Player
26	DF	POL	Bartosz Moś (at Ostrovia Ostrów Wielkopolski until 30 June 2026)
31	MF	POL	Hubert Dylewski (at Victoria Września until 30 June 2026)

No.	Pos.	Nation	Player
—	MF	POL	Wojciech Maroszek (at Pogoń Nowe Skalmierzyce until 30 June 2026)

=== Notable former players ===
Players who have played in the Ekstraklasa.

- (Poland) Mateusz Arian
- (Poland) Łukasz Derbich
- (Poland) Adam Dębiński
- (Poland) Nikodem Fiedosewicz
- (Poland) Mariusz Gostyński
- (Poland) Fabian Hiszpański
- (Poland) Tomasz Hołota
- (Poland) Marcin Kaczmarek
- (Poland) Tomasz Kowalski
- (Poland) Marcin Ludwikowski
- (Poland) Arkadiusz Maciejewski
- (Poland) Jacek Paczkowski
- (Poland) Marcin Radzewicz
- (Poland) Kacper Skibicki
- (Poland) Patryk Soboczyński
- (Poland) Hubert Sobol
- (Poland) Przemysław Stolc
- (Poland) Andrzej Trubeha
- (Poland) Damian Warchoł
- (Poland) Jakub Wilczyński
- (Poland) Mateusz Żebrowski
- (Poland) Łukasz Żegleń
- (Poland) Mateusz Żytko

== See also ==
- Kalisz
- Football in Poland
- List of football clubs in Poland
