= Bałtyk Koszalin =

Polish association football club

- Full name: Koszaliński Klub Piłki Nożnej „Bałtyk” Koszalin
- Founded: 25 February 1946; 80 years ago
- Ground: ZOS "Bałtyk" Stadium
- Capacity: 4,000
- Chairman: Dariusz Płaczkiewicz
- Manager: Karol Jabłoński
- League: III liga, group II
- 2025–26: IV liga West Pomerania, 1st of 17 (promoted)
- Website: http://www.baltykkoszalin.pl

Bałtyk Koszalin is a Polish multi-sports club with football, tennis and athletics sections, based in Koszalin, Pomerania. The football section is technically a separate legal entity from the rest of the club. The name Bałtyk means Baltic, the sea which Koszalin is situated upon its shore.

== History ==
The club was created on 25 February 1946 (4 months older than city rivals Gwardia Koszalin), making use of the small local stadium, which was opened in 1935, mainly focusing on athletics and tennis. The football section of the club was reactivated in 1995. This was due to the efforts of brothers Jan and Zenon Bednarek who transformed the football section into an independent club. The first club president was Jan Bednarek, who served this function until 1997, when he became the president of the local OZPN in Koszalin and resigned from the leadership. As a result, Zenon Bednarek took over as chairman.

== Youth system ==
Currently, the club KKPN Bałtyk trains about 300 players. The club has 11 teams, including 1 senior. The club has 11 coaches. In terms of youth football for many years it was the most successful academy in the region. The youth groups are run by KOZPN Koszalin, regularly winning the provincial junior league competitions. Currently, athletes who train at the club attend sports classes in the four schools of Koszalin. Classes 4-6 are located in Primary School No. 7, where a UKS Baltic SP7 Koszalin team was created. The club is working with School No. 6 where the sport lessons are organised by Bałtyk. Older students attend sports classes at the local College of Economics (classes 1-3).

== Notable players ==
The academy has produced many players who went on to play in the Ekstraklasa or represented the national team:

- Sebastian Mila - a runner-up at the 1999 UEFA Euro U16, part of the winning team at the 2001 UEFA Euro U21, earned 38 caps, currently an assistant coach of the Poland national team
- Łukasz Bednarek - a former Poland youth international at levels from under-14 to under-18, now a referee
- Mateusz Kaźmierczak - a former Poland under-15, under-16 and under-17 international, former Wisła Kraków player. After recovering from a knee injury, he played for Bałtyk, and coached youth groups at the club.
- Dominik Husejko - represented Poland at U-15, U-16 and U-17 level, was a player at Wisła Kraków.
- Marcin Bednarek - a former Poland under-16 international, then a player at SMS Szamotuły and Sokół Pniewy, now a coach at Bałtyk.
- Radosław Feliński - a representative of Polish U-15, U-16, U-17 and U-18 sides, formerly at Motor Lublin
- Arkadiusz and Łukasz Mokrzycki - formerly at SMS Szamotuły, Zagłębie Lubin, and Mieszko Gniezno
- Daniel Chyła - formerly played for SMS Szamotuły, Zagłębie Lubin and Górnik Polkowice
- Radosław Mikołajczak - SMS Szamotuly, now plays for Bałtyk
- Wojciech Pawłowski - former Lechia Gdańsk, Udinese Calcio and Śląsk Wrocław goalkeeper
- Kacper Kozłowski - Polish youth and senior international footballer, at Pogoń Szczecin and Brighton.
- Sebastian Rudol - Polish youth international and played for numerous Ekstraklasa clubs.
- Mateusz Kwiatkowski - played in the Ekstraklasa with Ruch Chorzów.

== Honours and awards ==
- Polish Cup (West Pomerania regionals)
  - Winners: 2012–13
- Polish U-19 Championship
  - Third place: 2010–11
- OZPN Koszalin Gold Badge for sport activism
- The Minister of Education's 2nd Degree Award - for educational activities and sports
- The title of best youth club in the Koszalin Voivodeship
