= Olimpia Koło =

Polish football club

- Full name: Miejski Klub Sportowy Olimpia Koło
- Founded: 1920; 105 years ago
- Ground: Stadion MOSiR
- Capacity: 1,600
- Chairman: Sebastian Kalinowski
- Manager: Łukasz Kujawa
- League: V liga Greater Poland II
- 2024–25: V liga Greater Poland, 2nd of 16
Home colours	Away colours

Olimpia Koło is a football club based in Koło, Poland. Olimpia was established in 1920 and currently competes in V liga Greater Poland II, the sixth level of Polish football.
