= 2020–21 II liga =

II liga
- Season: 2020–21
- Dates: 28 August 2020 – 12 June 2021
- Champions: Górnik Polkowice
- Promoted: Górnik Polkowice; GKS Katowice; Skra Częstochowa
- Relegated: Olimpia Grudziądz; Błękitni Stargard; Bytovia Bytów
- Matches played: 342
- Goals scored: 974 (2.85 per match)
- Top goalscorer: Kamil Wojtyra (24 goals)
- Biggest home win: Chojniczanka 6–0 Śląsk II (14 April 2021)
- Biggest away win: Błękitni 0–5 Stal (30 September 2020); Znicz 0–5 Skra (27 November 2020)
- Highest scoring: Lech II 6–3 Hutnik (5 September 2020)
- Longest winning run: 8 matches Górnik Polkowice
- Longest unbeaten run: 13 matches Górnik Polkowice
- Longest winless run: 13 matches Bytovia Bytów
- Longest losing run: 7 matches Bytovia Bytów
- Highest attendance: 3,679 (Note: Due to the COVID-19 pandemic, the match have been played with a limited number of spectators at maximum of 50% of stadium capacity.); Motor 2–2 Błękitni (12 September 2020)
- Lowest attendance: 0 (Note: Matches have been played behind closed doors without any spectators.); All matches from 17 October 2020 due to the COVID-19 pandemic.
- Total attendance: 81,506 (Note: Season total attendance after 120 matches (until 17 October 2020 and on 16 May 2021). All matches have been played with a limited number of spectators.)
- Average attendance: 679 (Note: Season total attendance after 120 matches (until 17 October 2020 and on 16 May 2021). All matches have been played with a limited number of spectators.) ▼

The 2020–21 II liga was the 73rd season of the third tier domestic division in the Polish football league system since its establishment in 1948 and the 13th season of the Polish II liga under its current title. The league was operated by the PZPN.

The league was contested by 19 teams. The regular season was played in a round-robin tournament. The season started on 28 August 2020 and concluded on 12 June 2021 (regular season). Each team played a total of 36 matches, half at home and half away. After the 18th matchday the league went on a winter break between 17 December 2020 and 26 February 2021. Due to the COVID-19 pandemic, the 120 matches have been played with a limited number of spectators. The rest of the matches (until 17 October 2020 and on 16 May 2021) were played behind closed doors without any spectators.

== Changes from last season ==
The following teams have changed division since the 2019–20 season.

=== To II liga ===
| Relegated from 2019–20 I liga | Promoted from 2019–20 III liga |
|---|---|
| ▼ Olimpia Grudziądz ▼ Chojniczanka Chojnice ▼ Wigry Suwałki | ▲ Sokół Ostróda (Group 1) ▲KKS 1925 Kalisz (Group 2) ▲ Śląsk Wrocław II (Group 3) ▲ Motor Lublin (Group 4) ▲ Hutnik Kraków (Group 4) |

=== From II liga ===
| Promoted to 2020–21 I liga | Relegated to 2020–21 III liga |
|---|---|
| ▲ Górnik Łęczna ▲ Widzew Łódź ▲ Resovia Rzeszów | ▼ Stal Stalowa Wola ▼ Elana Toruń ▼ Legionovia Legionowo ▼ Gryf Wejherowo |

== Team overview ==
=== Stadiums and locations ===
Location of teams and stadiums in 2020–21 II liga.

| Team | Location | Stadium | Capacity |
|---|---|---|---|
| Błękitni Stargard | Stargard | Stadion Miejski | 2,850 |
| Bytovia Bytów | Bytów | Stadion MOSiR | 2,043 |
| Chojniczanka Chojnice | Chojnice | Stadion Miejski Chojniczanka 1930 | 3,000 |
| Garbarnia Kraków | Kraków | Stadion RKS Garbarnia | 963 |
| GKS Katowice | Katowice | Stadion GKS Katowice | 6,710 |
| Górnik Polkowice | Polkowice | Stadion Miejski | 3,325 |
| Hutnik Kraków | Kraków | Stadion Suche Stawy | 6,000 |
| KKS 1925 Kalisz | Kalisz | Stadion OSRiR | 8,166 |
| Lech Poznań II | Poznań | Stadion Amiki Wronki | 5,296 |
| Motor Lublin | Lublin | Arena Lublin | 15,400 |
| Olimpia Elbląg | Elbląg | Stadion Miejski | 3,000 |
| Olimpia Grudziądz | Grudziądz | Stadion im. Bronisława Malinowskiego | 5,500 |
| Pogoń Siedlce | Siedlce | Stadion ROSRRiT | 2,901 |
| Skra Częstochowa | Częstochowa | Stolzle Stadion STO | 990 |
| Sokół Ostróda | Ostróda | Stadion Miejski | 4,998 |
| Stal Rzeszów | Rzeszów | Stadion Stal^{1} | 11,547 |
| Śląsk Wrocław II | Wrocław | Stadion Oporowska | 8,346 |
| Wigry Suwałki | Suwałki | Stadion OSiR | 3,060 |
| Znicz Pruszków | Pruszków | Stadion MZOS | 1,977 |

1. Due to the renovation of Stadion Stal in Rzeszów, Stal have played four home games at the Subcarpathian Football Center in Stalowa Wola.

== League table ==
| Pos | Team | Pld | W | D | L | GF | GA | GD | Pts | Promotion or Relegation |
|---|---|---|---|---|---|---|---|---|---|---|
| 1 | Górnik Polkowice (C, P) | 36 | 22 | 10 | 4 | 70 | 29 | +41 | 76 | Promotion to I liga |
| 2 | GKS Katowice (P) | 36 | 22 | 4 | 10 | 67 | 41 | +26 | 70 | Promotion to I liga |
| 3 | Chojniczanka Chojnice | 36 | 19 | 10 | 7 | 63 | 34 | +29 | 67 | Qualification for Promotion play-offs |
| 4 | Wigry Suwałki | 36 | 18 | 10 | 8 | 51 | 35 | +16 | 64 | Qualification for Promotion play-offs |
| 5 | KKS 1925 Kalisz | 36 | 17 | 6 | 13 | 51 | 40 | +11 | 57 | Qualification for Promotion play-offs |
| 6 | Skra Częstochowa (O, P) | 36 | 15 | 7 | 14 | 51 | 42 | +9 | 52 | Qualification for Promotion play-offs |
| 7 | Garbarnia Kraków | 36 | 14 | 10 | 12 | 49 | 50 | −1 | 52 | |
| 8 | Śląsk Wrocław II | 36 | 15 | 7 | 14 | 61 | 57 | +4 | 52 | |
| 9 | Motor Lublin | 36 | 12 | 14 | 10 | 48 | 44 | +4 | 50 | |
| 10 | Stal Rzeszów | 36 | 14 | 8 | 14 | 58 | 60 | −2 | 50 | |
| 11 | Sokół Ostróda | 36 | 14 | 4 | 18 | 50 | 56 | −6 | 46 | |
| 12 | Hutnik Kraków | 36 | 13 | 6 | 17 | 47 | 61 | −14 | 45 | |
| 13 | Pogoń Siedlce (Note: Pogoń Siedlce was punished with a deduction of 6 points for the use of unauthorized pharmacological support, this was later reduced to 3 points.) | 36 | 12 | 9 | 15 | 61 | 62 | −1 | 42 | |
| 14 | Lech Poznań II | 36 | 11 | 7 | 18 | 47 | 58 | −11 | 40 | |
| 15 | Znicz Pruszków | 36 | 10 | 8 | 18 | 37 | 55 | −18 | 38 | |
| 16 | Olimpia Elbląg | 36 | 9 | 10 | 17 | 39 | 52 | −13 | 37 | |
| 17 | Olimpia Grudziądz (R) | 36 | 10 | 6 | 20 | 42 | 67 | −25 | 36 | Relegation to III liga |
| 18 | Błękitni Stargard (R) | 36 | 8 | 12 | 16 | 36 | 66 | −30 | 36 | Relegation to III liga |
| 19 | Bytovia Bytów (Note: Bytovia did not apply for III liga license due to financial difficulties, then applied for IV liga license and will be playing in IV liga Pomerania.) (R) | 36 | 8 | 10 | 18 | 46 | 65 | −19 | 34 | Relegation to IV liga |

Updated to match(es) played on 5 June 2021. Source: 90minut.pl
Rules for classification: 1) Points; 2) Head-to-head points; 3) Head-to-head goal difference; 4) Head-to-head away goals scored (only if two teams); 5) Goal difference; 6) Goals scored; 7) Games won; 8) Away games won
(C) Champions; (O) Play-off winners; (P) Promoted; (R) Relegated

== Results ==
| Home \ Away | BŁĘ | BYT | CCH | GAR | KAT | GÓR | HUT | KAL | LPO | MOT | ELB | GRU | POG | SKR | SOK | STA | ŚLĄ | WIG | ZNI |
|---|---|---|---|---|---|---|---|---|---|---|---|---|---|---|---|---|---|---|---|
| Błękitni Stargard | — | 1–4 | | | | | 1–0 | | 1–0 | | | | 1–2 | 1–0 | | 0–5 | | 1–0 | 2–3 |
| Bytovia Bytów | | — | 3–2 | | 1–2 | 0–2 | | | | | 1–0 | 2–0 | | 0–1 | 1–0 | | 2–2 | 1–2 | |
| Chojniczanka Chojnice | 2–0 | | — | 3–1 | | | 4–1 | 3–0 | 3–0 | 0–0 | | | 4–2 | | | 2–1 | | | 2–0 |
| Garbarnia Kraków | 3–0 | 2–2 | | — | | | 2–1 | | 2–4 | | | | 0–0 | | | 0–0 | 1–3 | 1–3 | 2–1 |
| GKS Katowice | 5–0 | | 1–2 | 2–1 | — | | | 4–1 | 3–1 | 2–1 | | | 2–2 | | | | | | 1–1 |
| Górnik Polkowice | 2–1 | | | 2–1 | 0–2 | — | 3–0 | 2–1 | | 1–1 | | | 4–2 | | 3–0 | | | | 4–0 |
| Hutnik Kraków | | 3–1 | | | 3–2 | | — | | | | | 2–2 | | 3–1 | | | 2–5 | 1–2 | |
| KKS 1925 Kalisz | 2–0 | 2–1 | | 1–2 | | | 4–0 | — | 2–0 | | | | 0–1 | | | 0–2 | | 0–3 | 1–0 |
| Lech Poznań II | | 1–1 | | | | 1–3 | 6–3 | | — | | 2–3 | 1–2 | | 1–0 | | | 2–1 | 1–1 | |
| Motor Lublin | 2–2 | 2–1 | | 1–1 | | | 3–0 | 0–3 | 1–0 | — | | | 3–3 | | | 1–0 | | | 1–2 |
| Olimpia Elbląg | 4–2 | | 0–0 | 1–2 | 1–2 | 0–3 | 0–1 | | | 1–3 | — | 3–1 | | | 3–3 | | | | |
| Olimpia Grudziądz | 2–2 | | 1–3 | 1–2 | 1–3 | 0–1 | | 0–1 | | | | — | | | 0–4 | | | | 1–1 |
| Pogoń Siedlce | | | | | | | 2–1 | | 4–2 | | 4–3 | 0–1 | — | 1–2 | | 0–2 | 1–2 | 1–2 | |
| Skra Częstochowa | | | 1–0 | | 1–0 | 1–3 | | 1–0 | | 1–1 | 0–1 | 4–0 | | — | 3–0 | | | | |
| Sokół Ostróda | 0–2 | | 3–0 | 1–1 | | | 3–0 | 1–4 | 2–0 | 1–0 | | | 0–1 | | — | 2–3 | | | 2–0 |
| Stal Rzeszów | | 3–3 | | | 0–1 | 2–1 | | | | | 0–0 | 0–1 | | 3–2 | | — | 0–3 | 1–2 | |
| Śląsk Wrocław II | | | 2–0 | | 0–3 | 0–0 | | 0–3 | | 1–1 | 3–1 | 2–1 | | 0–1 | 0–2 | | — | | |
| Wigry Suwałki | | | 0–0 | | 1–2 | | | | | 1–0 | 2–1 | 1–1 | | 2–1 | 1–2 | | 2–0 | — | |
| Znicz Pruszków | | 1–1 | | | | | 1–0 | | 2–1 | | 1–1 | | 1–2 | 0–5 | | 0–2 | 1–3 | | — |

Updated to match(es) played on 16 December 2020. Source: 90minut.pl
Legend: Blue = home team win; Yellow = draw; Red = away team win.
For upcoming matches, an "a" indicates there is an article about the rivalry between the two participants.

== Promotion play-offs ==
II liga play-offs for the 2020–21 season were played on 15 and 19 June 2021. The teams who finished in 3rd, 4th, 5th and 6th place were set to compete. The fixtures were determined by final league position – 3rd team of regular season vs 6th team of regular season and 4th team of regular season vs 5th team of regular season. The winner of final match, Skra Częstochowa, won promotion to I liga for next season. All matches were played in a stadiums of team which occupied higher position in regular season.

Semi-finals; 16 June
3 | Chojniczanka Chojnice | 0
6 | Skra Częstochowa | 1
4 | Wigry Suwałki | 2(2)
5 | KKS 1925 Kalisz | 2(4)

Final; 19 June
5 | KKS 1925 Kalisz | 0
6 | Skra Częstochowa | 3

== Top goalscorers ==
| Goals | Player(s) |
|---|---|
| 24 goals | Kamil Wojtyra (Skra Częstochowa) |
| 20 goals | Sebastian Bergier (Śląsk Wrocław II), Dawid Wolny (Sokół Ostróda) |
| 16 goals | Szymon Skrzypczak (Chojniczanka Chojnice), Janusz Surdykowski (Olimpia Elbląg) |
| 15 goals | José Embaló (Olimpia Grudziądz), Piotr Giel (Bytovia Bytów) |
| 14 goals | Mateusz Piątkowski (Górnik Polkowice), Marcin Urynowicz (GKS Katowice) |
| 13 goals | Kamil Adamek (Wigry Suwałki), Eryk Sobków (Górnik Polkowice) |
| 12 goals | Filip Kozłowski (GKS Katowice), Wojciech Reiman (Stal Rzeszów), Mariusz Szuszkiewicz (Górnik Polkowice), Arkadiusz Woźniak (GKS Katowice) |

== See also ==
- 2020–21 Ekstraklasa
- 2020–21 I liga
- 2020–21 III liga
- 2020–21 Polish Cup
- 2020 Polish Super Cup
