= Polonia-Stal Świdnica =

- Full name: Miejski Klub Sportowy Polonia-Stal Świdnica
- Nickname(s): Chlory (The Chlorines)
- Founded: 23 July 1945; 79 years ago 2005 (refounded); 2014 (refounded)
- Ground: Stadion OSiR
- Capacity: 999
- Chairman: Jakub Stachurski
- Manager: Rafał Markowski
- League: IV liga Lower Silesia
- 2023–24: IV liga Lower Silesia, 12th of 18
- Website: www.poloniastal.swidnica.pl
Home colours	Away colours

MKS Polonia-Stal Świdnica is a Polish football club based in Świdnica, Poland. The club currently plays in the IV liga Lower Silesia.

== History ==
The club has had many names since its foundation on 23 July 1945. They are listed below;

- 23.07.1945 – KS [Klub Sportowy] Polonia Świdnica
- 1949 – KS Budowlani Świdnica
- 1951 – ZKS [Zakładowy Klub Sportowy] Kolejarz Świdnica
- 1952 – ZKS Stal Świdnica
- 1953 – MKS [Międzyzakładowy Klub Sportowy] Polonia Świdnica
- 19?? – MKS [Miejski Klub Sportowy] Polonia Świdnica
- 01.07.2005 – MKS Polonia/Sparta Świdnica (after a merger with KP Sparta Świdnica)
- 08.08.2014 – MKS Polonia-Stal Świdnica (after a merger with KP Stal Świdnica)

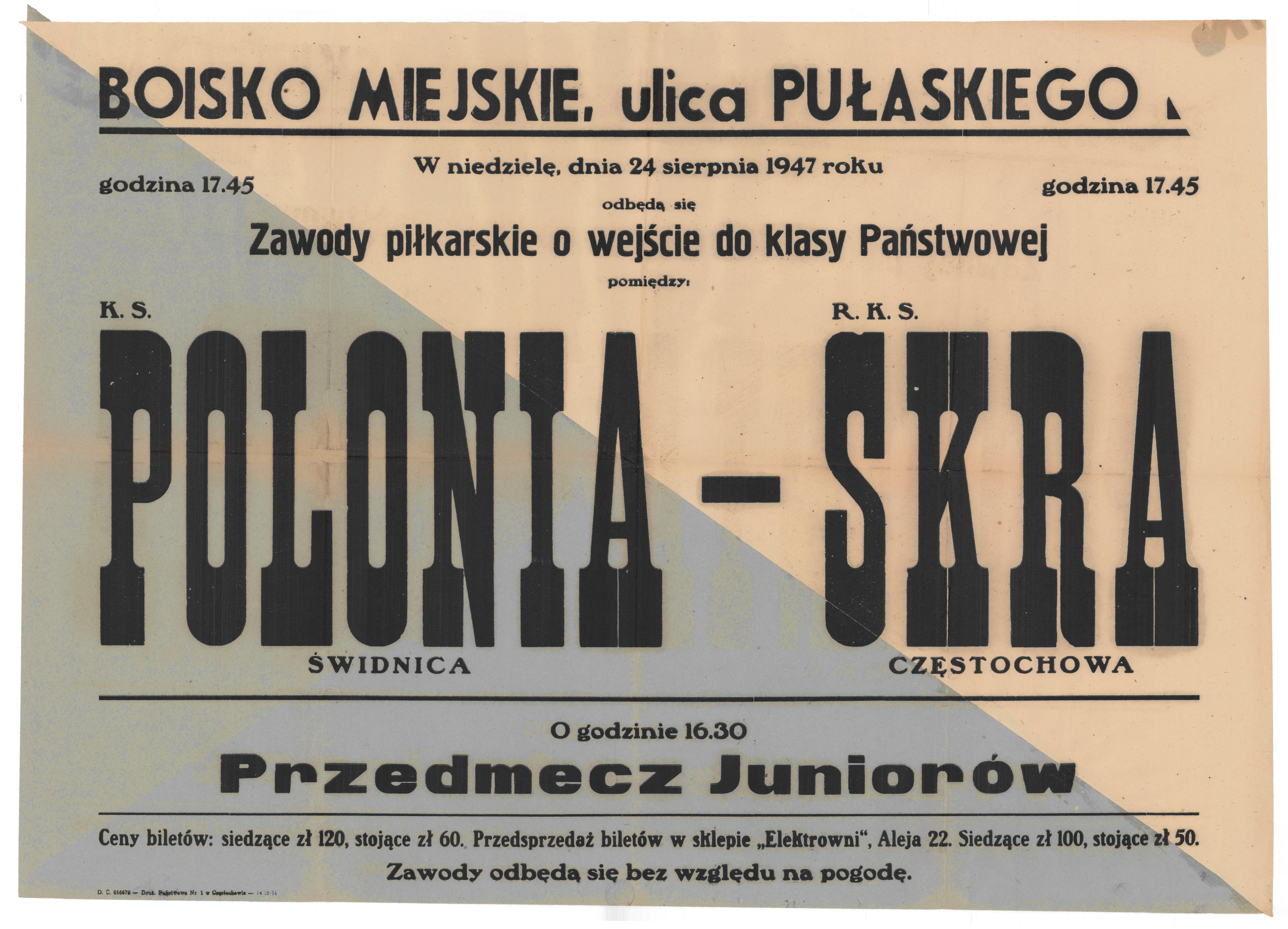
Poster advertising a 1947 Polish Football Championship game between Skra Częstochowa and Polonia Świdnica

Since 1946, Polonia Świdnica took part in the Polish championship. Polish Championships were played then knockout system up to 1948. The club first won promotion from the district of Wroclaw OZPN, and then lost in the 1/16 finals of the Polish Championship. In the 1947–48 season first the team advanced to the qualifying tournament, which took third place in Group III and received the right to play in 1949 in the newly formed Second League (D2). After two spent seasons team was ranked the 9th place in 1950 season and was relegated to the regional league. In 1966–67, they played in the third league, group I (Silesia), but the inheritance took 15th place and returned to the regional tournament. After a long break, it was only in 1991–92 the club was again played in the third league, group VII (Lower Silesia), where he finished in third place. Over the next few seasons, players were fighting for promotion to the second league and were close to repeating the success from the past. In the 1997–98 season, the team took 15th place in group II (Lower Silesia) III League (D3) and was relegated to the regional league. At the turn of the century club had financial problems. In the 2003–04 season, Polonia won the Class B Świdnica II (D7), and in the following campaign, finished in second place in group II Class A, group Wałbrzych II (D6). As another football club from Świdnica Sparta Świdnica (founded in 1995) played in the group of Lower Silesia IV League (D4), Polonia has decided to promote in the class by combining with it. As a result of the merger, Polonia/Sparta Świdnica was created on 1 July 2005. The club continued with the tradition of the Polonia (front name of the club, date of creation and logo), though he played instead of the Sparta in League IV. In the 2007–08 season, they won a group of Lower Silesia IV League, but were defeated in the play-offs for promotion to the new second league by Czarni Żagań (2–3, 1–2). Next year, they were the runners-up in group of Lower Silesia-Lubuska III League but in the play-offs for promotion to the second league, they lost again, this time to Zagłębie Sosnowiec (0–0, 0–1). On 8 August 2014, another merger took place, this time with the club in a lower league Stal Świdnica, founded in 1986. The merger club was renamed to Polonia-Stal Świdnica. Data of foundation – 1945 and the logo of the club reflects the continuation of the history of the Polonia.

== Supporters ==
The club has undergone many name changes as a result of mergers, in 2005 despite fan protests the club was renamed KP Polonia/Sparta Świdnica after a merger with KP Sparta Świdnica. After a merger with another local club Stal Świdnica and creating Polonia-Stal Świdnica in 2014, supporters of the club held protests. There are efforts to return to its historical name and logo.

== Honours ==
- Polish Cup
  - Round of 32: 1950–51
- Polish Cup (Wałbrzych regionals)
  - Winners: 1992–93, 2014–15, 2019–20

== Stadium ==
The Municipal Stadium OSiR in Świdnica, Poland, is located on Śląska Street in the eastern part of the city. The stadium has a capacity of 999 seats.
