= V liga =

- Country: Poland (Note: Only the Greater Poland, Lesser Poland and Masovian voivodeships.)
- Number of clubs: 144 (in 2026–27)
- Level on pyramid: 6 (Note: It applies only to the Greater Poland (Wielkopolskie), Lesser Poland (Małopolskie), Masovian (Mazowieckie) and Silesian (Śląskie) voivodeships. In the rest, the sixth tier is liga okręgowa.)
- Promotion to: IV liga
- Relegation to: Liga okręgowa
- Domestic cup: Polish Cup

V liga (Piąta liga, lit. 'Fifth League') represents the sixth level of the Polish football hierarchy. Teams promoted from V liga move up to IV liga, whilst relegated teams descend to the regional league.

As of 2026–27 season, this league is present only in the Greater Poland (Wielkopolskie), Lesser Poland (Małopolskie), Masovian (Mazowieckie) and Silesian (Śląskie) voivodeships.

== Team overview ==
As of 2026–27 season.

=== Greater Poland ===
==== Group I ====
- GKS Golęczewo
- Kłos Gałowo
- Korona Stróżewo
- KP Piła
- Lubuszanin Trzcianka
- Nasza Dyskobolia Grodzisk Wielkopolski
- Noteć Dziembowo
- Obra Zbąszyń
- Polonia Jastrowie
- Sparta Oborniki
- Sparta Szamotuły
- Sparta Złotów
- Tarnovia Tarnowo Podgórne
- Warta Międzychód
- Wełna Skoki
- Zamek Gołańcz

==== Group II ====
- 1922 Lechia Kostrzyn
- Kłos Zaniemyśl
- Olimpia Koło
- Polanin Strzałkowo
- Polonia Środa Wielkopolska II
- Polonus Kazimierz Biskupi
- Pompa Team Jarosławiec
- Poznańska 13 Poznań
- SKP Słupca
- Stella Luboń
- Tulisia Tuliszków
- UKS Śrem
- Unia Swarzędz II
- Warta Poznań II
- Wiara Lecha Poznań
- Wilki Wilczyn

==== Group III ====
- Centra Ostrów Wielkopolski
- Dąbroczanka Pępowo
- Jarota Jarocin
- KKS 1925 Kalisz II
- Korona Piaski
- Korona Wilkowice
- Krobianka Krobia
- LZS Jankowy
- Orla Jutrosin
- Orzeł Kawęczyn
- Polonia 1908 Marcinki Kępno
- Polonia 1912 II/Dąb Zaborowo (Leszno)
- Rawia Rawicz
- Sokół Bralin
- Tęcza/Osa Osieczna
- Zawisza Łęka Opatowska

=== Lesser Poland ===
==== Group East ====
- Dąbrovia Dąbrowa Tarnowska
- Dunajec Nowy Sącz
- Gród Podegrodzie
- Kolejarz Stróże
- KS Nowa Jastrząbka-Żukowice
- LKS Gnojnik
- Łosoś Łososina Dolna
- MLKS Żabno
- Okocimski KS Brzesko
- Orawa Jabłonka
- Podhale Nowy Targ II
- Poprad Rytro
- Sokół Słopnice
- Tarnovia Tarnów
- Turbacz Mszana Dolna
- Wisła Czarny Dunajec

==== Group West ====
- Garbarnia Kraków
- Kabel Kraków
- Kmita Zabierzów
- KS Chełmek
- LKS Bobrek
- Michałowianka Michałowice
- MKS Trzebinia
- Niwa Nowa Wieś
- Orzeł Myślenice
- Przebój Wolbrom
- Puszcza Niepołomice II
- Radziszowianka Radziszów
- Sokół Kocmyrzów Baranówka
- Świt Krzeszowice
- Tempo Białka
- Wróblowianka Wróblowice

=== Masovia ===
==== Group I ====
- Białe Orły Warsaw
- Błękitni Gąbin
- Bug Wyszków
- Drukarz Warsaw
- Escola Varsovia Warsaw
- Gladiator Słoszewo
- Huragan Wołomin
- Kasztelan Sierpc
- Marcovia Marki
- Naprzód Zielonki
- Narew Ostrołęka
- Ożarowianka Ożarów Mazowiecki
- PAF Płońsk
- Sokół Serock
- Wicher Kobyłka
- Znicz Pruszków II

==== Group II ====
- Champion Warsaw
- Drogowiec Jedlińsk
- Jodła Jedlnia-Letnisko
- Józefovia Józefów
- LKS Chlebnia
- Perła Złotokłos
- Pilica Białobrzegi
- Pogoń Siedlce II
- Powiślanka Lipsko
- Proch Pionki
- Radomiak Radom II
- Tygrys Huta Mińska
- Ursus Warsaw II
- Wektra Zbuczyn
- Wilga Garwolin
- Żyrardowianka Żyrardów

=== Silesia ===
==== Group I ====
- AKS Mikołów
- CKS Czeladź (2)
- Górnik Piaski (Czeladź)
- Gwarek Ornontowice
- Jedność 32 Przyszowice
- Liswarta Krzepice
- Odra Miasteczko Śląskie
- Orzeł Miedary
- Pilica Koniecpol
- Sarmacja Będzin
- Start Sierakowice
- Śląsk Świętochłowice
- Unia Dąbrowa Górnicza
- Unia Rędziny
- Zagłębie Sosnowiec II
- Zieloni Żarki

==== Group II ====
- Beskid 09 Skoczów
- BKS Stal Bielsko-Biała
- Błyskawica Drogomyśl
- Forteca Świerklany
- GLKS Wilkowice
- Góral Istebna
- LKS Czaniec
- KS Goczałkowice-Zdrój II
- LKS Tworków
- MKS Lędziny
- Pasjonat Dankowice
- Pniówek Pawłowice
- Rekord Bielsko-Biała II
- Stal-Śrubiarnia Żywiec
- Start Mszana
- Tempo Puńców

== Champions ==
=== Greater Poland ===
Season	Group I	Group II	Group III
2019–20 (Note: The season ended after the matchday 15 due to the coronavirus pandemic.)	Concordia Murowana Goślina	Krobianka Krobia	Odolanovia Odolanów
2020–21	Huragan Pobiedziska	Korona Piaski	SKP Słupca
2021–22	Noteć Czarnków	Lipno Stęszew	Polonia 1912 Leszno
2022–23	Polonia Chodzież	Wiara Lecha Poznań	Ostrovia 1909 Ostrów Wielkopolski
2023–24	Piast Kobylnica	LKS Ślesin	Warta Śrem
2024–25	Warta Międzychód	Górnik Konin	Zefka Kobyla Góra
2025–26	Kłos Budzyń	Avia Kamionki	Astra Krotoszyn

=== Lesser Poland ===
Season	Group East	Group West
2022–23	Watra Białka Tatrzańska	Niwa Nowa Wieś
2023–24	KS Biecz	Wieczysta Kraków II
2024–25	Okocimski KS Brzesko	Garbarnia Kraków
2025–26	Wolania Wola Rzędzińska	Victoria 1918 Jaworzno

=== Masovia ===
Season	Group I	Group II
2022–23	KTS Weszło	Józefovia Józefów
2023–24	MKS Przasnysz	Tygrys Huta Mińska
2024–25	KS Łomianki	Mazur Karczew
2025–26	Polonia Warsaw II	Podlasie Sokołów Podlaski

=== Silesia ===
Season	Group I	Group II
2024–25	Szombierki Bytom	Orzeł Łękawica
2025–26	Ruch Chorzów II	MRKS Czechowice-Dziedzice
