= Górnik Konin =

KS Górnik Konin
- Full name: Klub Sportowy Górnik Konin
- Nickname: Łańcuchy (The Chains)
- Founded: 7 June 1957; 68 years ago
- Ground: Stadion im. Złotej Jedenastki Kazimierza Górskiego
- Capacity: 3,174
- Chairman: Jakub Skoczylas
- Manager: Marcin Woźniak
- League: IV liga Greater Poland
- 2024–25: V liga Greater Poland II, 1st of 16 (promoted)
- Website: gornikkonin.com.pl
Home colours	Away colours

Klub Sportowy Górnik Konin is a Polish football club based in Konin, Poland. They currently play in the IV liga Greater Poland, the fifth tier of Polish football.

Its biggest successes came under the unpopular Klub Sportowy Aluminium Konin name in the 1997–98 season, when they finished runners-up in the second division and very controversially lost the Polish Cup final that year to Amica Wronki. Despite this success, the club has had a long history of financial mismanagement and turbulent ownership stemming from that era, as a result of which the club has struggled to recover from ever since.

== History ==
=== Beginnings and rise ===
Football in Konin can be traced back to the early 20th century. The current club's predecessors have been active since 1945, after many mergers till 1954 when the Koło Sportowe Górnik was founded, which 3 years later, in 1957 became today's Klub Sportowy Górnik Konin, its registration is officially recognised as its founding date. The club spent the 1960s, 1970s and 1980s oscillating between the voivodeship-level leagues and the third tier of Polish football. In the 1991–92 season, Górnik finally gained the long-awaited promotion to the second division for the first time, despite coming close several times before.

=== Name change and the 1998 Cup Final ===
In 1996–97, the main sponsor of the club, the local coal mine "Konin" withdrew its funding, and the club was transferred under the wing of the local aluminium foundry. The new owners however made the very unpopular decision to change the club name to Aluminium Konin, despite many fan-protests. The following 1997–98 season was the most successful in its history, however considering the amount of funding the club received and the fact that its ultimate aim was promotion to the top tier, the season was still classed as disappointing.

The highly unpopular logo used when the club participated under the Aluminium Konin name

Even reaching the Polish Cup final did little to please fans, as despite Aluminium being by far the better team, Amica Wronki won in controversial circumstances, with many officiating mistakes made by the referee Marek Kowalczyk. Aluminium players initially refused to start the second half. Impartial observers, such the manager of Lech Poznań Adam Topolski, chairman of Olimpia Poznań (a top flight club at the time) Bolesław Krzyżostaniak, the chief of Zawisza Bydgoszcz Edward Potok and former Górnik Konin manager Janusz Białek were all highly critical of the match they have witnessed. Over 7000 Górnik fans were present at Bułgarska Street Stadium in Poznań, additionally supported by local Lech Poznań fans. Despite the PZPN match observer Alojzy Jarguz inexplicably giving the referee a high note for his performance, Kowalczyk was later given a 3-month ban.

In the aftermath of the match, Ryszard F., known as "Fryzjer", the leader of an organised crime group involved in fixing matches all around the country, was the director of Amica Wronki at the time. He later admitted to fixing the match in his autobiography. The 1998 cup final however was never investigated, with trophy still belonging to the now defunct Amica Wronki team, and remains a sore point for Górnik fans to this day.

=== Mismanagement & scandals ===
The following 1998–99 season was greeted with financial troubles, after the privatisation of the aluminium foundry meant that it was taken over by the company "Impexmetal SA", who withdrew their support for the club. Despite issues, they still finished the first half of the season in first place. The owners of the club, the aluminium works, also created a complicated structure whereby there was one club, but the reserve teams and junior sides played under a different name, resulting in one club, two boards, and two names, and made each section a separate legal entity. Piotr Nowak became the chairman of the club, but the then manager Jerzy Kasalik was surprisingly sacked for an unexplained reason, despite their first place in the league, and appointed a little-known manager Jarosław Kotas. The team soon started to lose matches at an alarming rate and only just managed to escape relegation, only thanks to their good start.

The 1999–2000 campaign proved to be a disaster. The owners decided to rename the senior team KP Konin, whilst the reserve and junior teams used the old Aluminium Konin name. The club finished dead last after abysmal performances. It then turned out that in the second half of the season plans to relocate the team to Bydgoszcz were put in place, but still to play under the name KP Konin. In the end, the relocation never came to fruition, but the team which only amassed 8 points the entire season, was disbanded, with the club management and the chairman Piotr Nowak, who played professional football in the USA on a daily basis at the time, widely held responsible. The reserve team, which that same season was relegated from the third division, became the first team, and a season later (2000–01 season) managed to gain promotion, going straight back up.

Under the lead of Jerzy Kasalik, the team achieved a back-to-back promotion to the second division, restoring the club's place after the first team was disbanded. The success however was short-lived, after in the 2003–04 season the club finished last once again. Following their relegation, many of the Aluminium players were involved in the large corruption scandal in Polish football which shook the country that season, which had a major impact on the club sponsors who all withdrew. This meant that the new club couldn't even afford to play in the then regional III liga, and the senior team was disbanded.

=== New start ===
The only team left was the Aluminium junior team, which played in the local A-klasa, the sixth tier of Polish football. The ambitious team won promotion in the 2005. In the 2006–07 season, the restructuring of the league by the Polish FA meant that despite winning the fourth division, the club would need a play-off against GKS Tychy to gain promotion, which they lost. In April 2008, a new sponsor was found, white goods and consumer electronics retail chain Avans, and after 12 years of waiting to drop the very unpopular Aluminium name, the club finally reverted to its historical name Górnik, initially at first with the one season-long sponsor name in the form of KS Avans Górnik Konin. The club was still burdened with debts and various managerial problems which were left after the "Aluminium" era.

== Fans ==
Górnik organised fan movement started in the late 1980s, and took off in the 90's, however the club was always very popular among locals. The club has had a constant number of loyal supporters regardless of the division the team happened to be in (which varied from local amateur division to nationwide leagues). Their nickname is Łańcuchy (The Chains).

Their number one enemy has always been fans of KKS Kalisz. Other strong rivalries have been with Legia Chełmża, with an infamous riots between the two hitting major headlines in 2010, and with Amica Wronki (now re-founded as Błękitni Wronki) due to the 1998 Polish Cup final shrouded in scandal, although due to vast gap in the league pyramid there has not been many matches with the latter.

Like many teams in the Greater Poland region, at first Górnik fans were also fans of the local powerhouse Lech Poznań, and it was Lech fans which were the inspiration and precursors of the fan movement in Konin. Although presently the two sets of fans have no connection with each other, many Górnik fans still sympathise with Lech. The fans used to have friendly relations in the 90's with fans of Górnik Wałbrzych. Fans of Ostrovia Ostrów Wielkopolski are also warmly welcomed, as like Górnik, also sympathise with Lech and have a strong rivalry with KKS Kalisz. Presently the fans have friendly relations with fans of Gwardia Koszalin, officially since 18 April 2009.

== Honours ==
- II liga
  - Runners-up: 1997–98
- Polish Cup
  - Finalists: 1997–88

== Naming history ==
Like most Polish clubs during the Polish People's Republic era, the club has undergone many name changes. The club was also officially known as Aluminium Konin for 12 years:

- (1957) – KS Górnik Konin
- (18.03.1968) – MZKS Zagłębie Konin
- (19.11.1979) – KS Górnik Konin
- (20.01.1997) – KS Aluminium Konin
- (19.02.1999) – KS Aluminium SSA
- (June 1999) – KP Konin SSA (first team only – junior and reserve team were called "KS Aluminium SSA")
- (2000) – KS Aluminium Konin ("KP Konin SSA" disbanded)
- (June 2008) – KS Górnik Konin
- (2008–09) – KS Avans Górnik Konin (1 season-long sponsorship name)
- (2009) – KS Górnik Konin

== Notable players ==
Internationally capped players

- Radosław Cierzniak, goalkeeper, player of Poland U-21 and Poland national football team
- Ryszard Jankowski, goalkeeper, player of Poland national football team
