= TP Ostrovia Ostrów Wielkopolski =

Polish football club

- Full name: Towarzystwo Piłkarskie Ostrovia 1909 Ostrów Wielkopolski
- Nicknames: Biało-Czerwoni, Kolejarz, Ovia, Bażanty
- Founded: 27 May 1909; 117 years ago
- Ground: Municipal Stadium
- Capacity: 12,000
- Chairman: Mariusz Kwiecień
- Manager: Józef Klepak
- League: IV liga Greater Poland
- 2025–26: IV liga Greater Poland, 11th of 18
- Website: http://www.ostrovia1909.pl/
Home colours	Away colours

Towarzystwo Piłkarskie Ostrovia 1909 Ostrów Wielkopolski, commonly known as Ostrovia Ostrów Wielkopolski, is a Polish football club based in Ostrów Wielkopolski, one of the oldest still existing football club in the Greater Poland region. It currently competes in the IV liga Greater Poland, the fifth level of the national league system.

== History ==
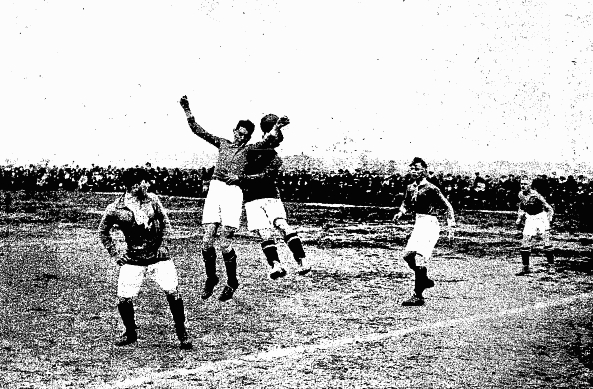
Match with Warta Poznań in 1922

The club was founded in 1909 on the initiative of Polish youth from Ostrów, at a time when Poland was still partitioned between foreign empires, with Ostrów itself located in the Prussian Partition, and subjected to Germanisation policies. Ostrovia was the first club in Greater Poland whose members were exclusively Polish, and the first in the Prussian Partition whose statute was written in Polish. The white-and-red colors were adopted for patriotic reasons and remain in use to this day. In 1913, Ostrovia, along with Poznań teams Warta Poznań and Posnania, co-founded the Association of Polish Sports Clubs (now the regional Greater Poland Football Association). After Poland regained its independence following World War I, Ostrovia participated in the newly established Polish competition.

During World War II, vice-president of the club Teodor Banasiewicz was murdered by the Russians in the Katyn massacre in 1940.
