= Mieszko Gniezno =

Polish football club

- Full name: Międzyzakładowy Klub Sportowy; Mieszko Gniezno
- Founded: November 1974; 50 years ago
- Ground: Municipal Stadium
- Capacity: 3,382
- Chairman: Marek Lisiecki
- Manager: Przemysław Urbaniak
- League: IV liga Greater Poland
- 2023–24: IV liga Greater Poland, 9th of 18
- Website: http://mieszkogniezno.eu/
Home colours	Away colours

Mieszko Gniezno is a football club based in Gniezno, Poland. They currently play in the IV liga Greater Poland, the fifth tier of Polish league football. The club's name commemorates Polish ruler Mieszko I of Poland, who ruled Poland in the 10th century, when Gniezno was capital of Poland.

== History ==
In 1989, Mieszko's senior team achieved the greatest success in the club's history, reaching the quarter-finals of the Polish Cup at the central level. After eliminating teams such as Gwardia Warszawa, Śląsk Wrocław and Szombierki Bytom, Mieszko had to face Legia Warsaw. There were no shocks however, in Gniezno despite the support of over 15,000 fans Mieszko lost 0–5, and in Warsaw, they lost 1–5 (an honorary goal by Tomasz Kurowski).

On 17 June 2018, after winning the playoff match against Victoria Września (both matches won 2–1 and 4–1 respectively), the team was promoted to the fourth division. From the 2018–19 season, Mieszko played in the 2nd group of the fourth division.

The club finished 5th consecutively between the 2018–19 and 2019–20 seasons. Despite the two previous good seasons, in the 2020–21 season Mieszko finished bottom and were relegated to the fifth division once again. The following season, the team failed to get promoted finishing 5th, thirteen points off of 1st place.

== Honours ==
- IV liga Greater Poland (North)
  - Champions: 2002–03, 2017–18
- Regional league (Poznań)
  - Champions: 2000–01, 2016–17 (East)
- Polish Cup
  - Quarter-finalists: 1989–90
