= IV liga Greater Poland =

- Organising body: Greater Poland; Football Association
- Founded: 2000; 26 years ago
- Country: Poland
- Number of clubs: 18
- Level on pyramid: 5
- Promotion to: III liga, group II
- Relegation to: V liga Greater Poland I V liga Greater Poland II; V liga Greater Poland III
- Current champions: Kotwica Kórnik (2nd title) (2025–26)
- Sponsor(s): Artbud

IV liga Greater Poland group (grupa wielkopolska), also known as MetaLaser IV liga wielkopolska for sponsorship reasons, is one of the groups of IV liga, the fifth level of Polish football league system.

The league was created in the 2000–01 season after a new administrative division of Poland was introduced. Until the end of the 2007–08 season, IV liga was the fourth level of league system, but this was changed with the formation of the Ekstraklasa as the top level league in Poland. Initially divided into North and South groups, the format was changed in 2018 to hold competition in a single-group system.

The clubs from Greater Poland Voivodeship compete in this group. The winner of the league is promoted to the second group of the III liga. The bottom teams are relegated to the Greater Poland groups of V liga.
