= Daniel Skiba =

Polish footballer (born 2000)

Personal information
- Full name: Daniel Mikołaj Skiba
- Date of birth: 5 December 2000 (age 25)
- Place of birth: Poland
- Height: 1.85 m (6 ft 1 in)
- Position: Striker

Team information
- Current team: Słowianin Wolibórz
- Number: 90

Youth career
- –2013: GKS Tychy
- 2013: Chrzciciel Tychy
- 2013–2018: GKS Tychy

Senior career*
| Years | Team | Apps | (Gls) |
| 2018 | Polonia Łaziska Górne | 4 | (0) |
| 2019–2021 | Železiarne Podbrezová | 4 | (0) |
| 2020 | → Slavoj Trebišov (loan) | 8 | (1) |
| 2021 | Unia Kosztowy | 11 | (5) |
| 2022 | Polonia Łaziska Górne | 14 | (3) |
| 2022–2023 | NK Aluminij | 40 | (12) |
| 2024 | Chojniczanka Chojnice | 4 | (0) |
| 2024–2025 | Wiślanie Skawina | 4 | (0) |
| 2025 | Kotwica Kołobrzeg | 8 | (0) |
| 2026– | Słowianin Wolibórz | 9 | (0) |
- * Club domestic league appearances and goals as of 16:17, 4 June 2026 (UTC)

Daniel Mikołaj Skiba (born 5 December 2000) is a Polish professional footballer who plays as a striker for III liga club Słowianin Wolibórz.

== Early life ==
Skiba was born in 2000 in Poland. He started playing football at the age of five.

== Career ==
Skiba started his career with Polish side Polonia Łaziska Górne. In 2019, he signed for Slovak side FK Železiarne Podbrezová. In 2020, he was sent on loan to Slovak side FK Slavoj Trebišov. In 2021, he signed for Polish side Unia Kosztowy. In 2022, he signed for Polish side Polonia Łaziska Górne. After that, he signed for Slovenian side NK Aluminij. He was regarded as one of the club's most important players. In 2024, he signed for Polish side Chojniczanka Chojnice. He was released at the end of the 2023–24 season.

In August 2024, he moved to III liga club Wiślanie Skawina, and made his debut on 10 August in a 2–1 away loss to Pogoń-Sokół Lubaczów. On 3 January 2025, Wiślanie and Skiba mutually agreed to part ways.

On 14 March 2025, Skiba signed with second division club Kotwica Kołobrzeg. On 22 June 2025, all Kotwica players, including Skiba, were released from their contracts.

== Personal life ==
Skiba is a native of Tychy, Poland. He is the son of Kamil Skiba.

== Career statistics ==
As of match played 30 May 2026

Appearances and goals by club, season and competition
| Club | Season | League | | | National cup (Note: Includes Slovak Cup, Slovenian Cup) | | Europe | | Other | | Total | |
| Club | Season | Division | Apps | Goals | Apps | Goals | Apps | Goals | Apps | Goals | Apps | Goals |
|---|---|---|---|---|---|---|---|---|---|---|---|---|
| Polonia Łaziska Górne | 2018–19 | IV liga Silesia II | 4 | 0 | — | | — | | — | | 4 | 0 |
| Železiarne Podbrezová | 2018–19 | Slovak First Football League | 1 | 0 | 0 | 0 | — | | — | | 1 | 0 |
| Železiarne Podbrezová | 2019–20 | 2. Liga | 0 | 0 | 0 | 0 | — | | — | | 0 | 0 |
| Železiarne Podbrezová | 2020–21 | 2. Liga | 3 | 0 | 2 | 0 | — | | — | | 5 | 0 |
| Železiarne Podbrezová | Total | | 4 | 0 | 2 | 0 | — | | — | | 6 | 0 |
| Slavoj Trebišov (loan) | 2020–21 | 2. Liga | 8 | 1 | 0 | 0 | — | | — | | 8 | 1 |
| Unia Kosztowy | 2021–22 | IV liga Silesia I | 11 | 5 | — | | — | | — | | 11 | 5 |
| Polonia Łaziska Górne | 2021–22 | IV liga Silesia I | 14 | 3 | — | | — | | — | | 14 | 3 |
| NK Aluminij | 2022–23 | Slovenian Second League | 30 | 10 | 4 | 1 | — | | 2 (Note: Appearances in Slovenian PrvaLiga promotion/relegation play-offs) | 1 | 36 | 12 |
| NK Aluminij | 2023–24 | Slovenian PrvaLiga | 10 | 2 | 0 | 0 | — | | — | | 10 | 2 |
| NK Aluminij | Total | | 40 | 12 | 4 | 1 | — | | 2 | 1 | 46 | 14 |
| Chojniczanka Chojnice | 2023–24 | II liga | 3 | 0 | — | | — | | 1 (Note: Appearance in II liga promotion play-offs) | 0 | 4 | 0 |
| Wiślanie Skawina | 2024–25 | III liga, group IV | 4 | 0 | — | | — | | — | | 4 | 0 |
| Kotwica Kołobrzeg | 2024–25 | I liga | 8 | 0 | — | | — | | — | | 8 | 0 |
| Słowianin Wolibórz | 2025–26 | III liga, group III | 9 | 0 | — | | — | | — | | 9 | 0 |
| Career total | | | 105 | 21 | 6 | 1 | 0 | 0 | 3 | 1 | 114 | 23 |
