= 2023–24 in Polish football =

Football in Poland
- Season: 2023–24

Men's football
- Ekstraklasa: Jagiellonia Białystok
- I liga: Lechia Gdańsk
- II liga: Pogoń Siedlce
- Polish Cup: Wisła Kraków
- Polish Super Cup: Legia Warsaw

2023–24 in Polish football
- Teams in Europe
- Raków Częstochowa; Legia Warsaw; Lech Poznań; Pogoń Szczecin
- Poland national team
- UEFA Euro 2024 qualifying

The 2023–24 season was the 99th season of competitive football in Poland.

== Men's football ==
=== League competitions ===
==== Ekstraklasa ====
Pos	Team	Pld	W	D	L	GF	GA	GD	Pts	Qualification or relegation
1	Jagiellonia Białystok	34	18	9	7	77	45	+32	63 (Note: Jagiellonia Białystok finished ahead of Śląsk Wrocław on head-to-head goal difference: Śląsk Wrocław 2–1 Jagiellonia Białystok, Jagiellonia Białystok 3–1 Śląsk Wrocław)	Qualification for the Champions League second qualifying round
2	Śląsk Wrocław	34	18	9	7	50	31	+19	63	Qualification for the Conference League second qualifying round
3	Legia Warsaw	34	16	11	7	51	39	+12	59	Qualification for the Conference League second qualifying round
4	Pogoń Szczecin	34	16	7	11	59	38	+21	55	
5	Lech Poznań	34	14	11	9	47	41	+6	53	
6	Górnik Zabrze	34	15	8	11	45	41	+4	53	
7	Raków Częstochowa	34	14	10	10	54	39	+15	52	
8	Zagłębie Lubin	34	13	8	13	43	50	−7	47	
9	Widzew Łódź	34	13	7	14	45	46	−1	46	
10	Piast Gliwice	34	9	16	9	38	35	+3	43 (Note: Piast Gliwice finished ahead of Stal Mielec on head-to-head points: Stal Mielec 0–0 Piast Gliwice, Piast Gliwice 3–0 Stal Mielec)	
11	Stal Mielec	34	11	10	13	42	48	−6	43	
12	Puszcza Niepołomice	34	9	13	12	39	49	−10	40	
13	Cracovia	34	8	15	11	45	46	−1	39	
14	Korona Kielce	34	8	14	12	40	44	−4	38 (Note: Korona Kielce finished ahead of Radomiak Radom on head-to-head points: Radomiak Radom 1–1 Korona Kielce, Korona Kielce 4–0 Radomiak Radom)	
15	Radomiak Radom	34	10	8	16	41	58	−17	38	
16	Warta Poznań	34	9	10	15	33	43	−10	37	Relegation to I liga
17	Ruch Chorzów	34	6	14	14	40	55	−15	32	Relegation to I liga
18	ŁKS Łódź	34	6	6	22	34	75	−41	24	Relegation to I liga

Source: ekstraklasa.org 90minut.pl
Rules for classification: 1) Points; 2) Head-to-head points; 3) Head-to-head goal difference; 4) Goal difference; 5) Goals scored; 6) Number of wins; 7) Number of away wins; 8) Lower number of points based on yellow and red cards (red card = 3 points, yellow card = 1 point, sending-off = 3 points - including 1 point for first yellow card); 9) Fairplay ranking; 10) Draw.
(Note: Head-to-head record is used only after all the matches between the teams in question have been played)

==== I liga ====
Pos	Team	Pld	W	D	L	GF	GA	GD	Pts	Promotion or Relegation
1	Lechia Gdańsk (C, P)	34	21	5	8	60	34	+26	68	Promotion to Ekstraklasa
2	GKS Katowice (P)	34	18	8	8	68	35	+33	62 (Note: GKS Katowice finished ahead of Arka Gdynia on head-to-head points: Katowice 1–1 Arka Gdynia, Arka Gdynia 0–1 Katowice)	Promotion to Ekstraklasa
3	Arka Gdynia	34	18	8	8	52	34	+18	62	Qualification for promotion play-offs
4	Motor Lublin (O, P)	34	16	8	10	49	42	+7	56	Qualification for promotion play-offs
5	Górnik Łęczna	34	14	13	7	35	29	+6	55	Qualification for promotion play-offs
6	Odra Opole	34	15	8	11	42	32	+10	53	Qualification for promotion play-offs
7	Wisła Płock	34	14	9	11	46	46	0	51 (Note: Wisła Płock finished ahead of Miedź Legnica and GKS Tychy on head-to-head points: Wisła Płock 9, Miedź Legnica 5, GKS Tychy 2)	
8	Miedź Legnica	34	13	12	9	52	36	+16	51	
9	GKS Tychy	34	16	3	15	43	47	−4	51	
10	Wisła Kraków	34	13	11	10	62	50	+12	50	Qualification for Europa League first qualifying round (Note: Wisła Kraków qualified for the Europa League first qualifying round as the 2023–24 Polish Cup winners.)
11	Stal Rzeszów	34	14	6	14	53	60	−7	48	
12	Chrobry Głogów	34	11	9	14	35	49	−14	42 (Note: Chrobry Głogów finished ahead of Znicz Pruszków on head-to-head points: Chrobry Głogów 1–0 Znicz Pruszków, Znicz Pruszków 0–0 Chrobry Głogów)	
13	Znicz Pruszków	34	12	6	16	34	44	−10	42	
14	Bruk-Bet Termalica Nieciecza	34	10	11	13	56	52	+4	41	
15	Polonia Warsaw	34	8	11	15	41	50	−9	35	
16	Resovia Rzeszów (R)	34	9	7	18	39	60	−21	34	Relegation to II liga
17	Podbeskidzie Bielsko-Biała (R)	34	4	11	19	26	59	−33	23	Relegation to II liga
18	Zagłębie Sosnowiec (R)	34	2	10	22	21	55	−34	16	Relegation to II liga

Source: 1liga.org, 90minut.pl
Rules for classification: 1) Points; 2) Head-to-head points; 3) Head-to-head goal difference; 4) Goal difference; 6) Goals scored; 7) Number of wins; 8) Number of away wins.
(Note: Head-to-head record was used only after all the matches between the teams in question have been played)
(C) Champions; (O) Play-off winner; (P) Promoted; (R) Relegated

==== II liga ====
Pos	Team	Pld	W	D	L	GF	GA	GD	Pts	Promotion or Relegation
1	Pogoń Siedlce (C, P)	34	16	10	8	57	45	+12	58	Promotion to I liga
2	Kotwica Kołobrzeg (P)	34	16	8	10	61	44	+17	56	Promotion to I liga
3	KKS 1925 Kalisz	34	15	10	9	48	32	+16	55	Qualification for promotion play-offs
4	Stal Stalowa Wola (O, P)	34	15	9	10	44	38	+6	54 (Note: Stal Stalowa Wola finished ahead of Chojniczanka Chojnice on head-to-head points: Stal Stalowa Wola 5–2 Chojniczanka Chojnice, Chojniczanka Chojnice 1–1 Stal Stalowa Wola)	Qualification for promotion play-offs
5	Chojniczanka Chojnice	34	15	9	10	49	44	+5	54	Qualification for promotion play-offs
6	Polonia Bytom	34	14	11	9	57	48	+9	53	Qualification for promotion play-offs
7	Radunia Stężyca (Note: Radunia withdrew from the competition at the end of the season.) (R)	34	13	11	10	48	45	+3	50	Relegation to IV liga
8	Hutnik Kraków	34	13	10	11	47	43	+4	49	
9	Zagłębie Lubin II	34	13	7	14	48	47	+1	46	
10	ŁKS Łódź II	34	12	9	13	46	49	−3	45	
11	GKS Jastrzębie	34	11	10	13	43	48	−5	43	
12	Wisła Puławy	34	9	14	11	48	50	−2	41	
13	Olimpia Elbląg	34	10	10	14	35	46	−11	40 (Note: Olimpia Elbląg finished ahead of Olimpia Grudziądz and Skra Częstochowa on head-to-head points: Olimpia Elbląg 9, Olimpia Grudziądz 5, Skra Częstochowa 2)	
14	Olimpia Grudziądz	34	10	10	14	35	42	−7	40	
15	Skra Częstochowa	34	10	10	14	40	43	−3	40	
16	Lech Poznań II (R)	34	10	9	15	34	50	−16	39	Relegation to III liga
17	Sandecja Nowy Sącz (R)	34	9	8	17	34	48	−14	35	Relegation to III liga
18	Stomil Olsztyn (R)	34	9	7	18	30	42	−12	34	Relegation to III liga

Source: 90minut.pl
Rules for classification: 1) Points; 2) Head-to-head points; 3) Head-to-head goal difference; 4) Goal difference; 6) Goals scored; 7) Number of wins; 8) Number of away wins.
(Note: Head-to-head record was used only after all the matches between the teams in question have been played)
(C) Champions; (O) Play-off winner; (P) Promoted; (R) Relegated

==== III liga ====
===== Group 1 =====
Pos	Team	Pld	W	D	L	GF	GA	GD	Pts	Promotion
1	Pogoń Grodzisk Mazowiecki (C, P)	34	23	7	4	106	32	+74	76	Promotion to II liga
2	Unia Skierniewice	34	19	8	7	78	46	+32	65 (Note: Unia Skierniewice are ahead of Legia Warsaw II on head-to-head points: Unia Skierniewice 4–0 Legia Warsaw II, Legia Warsaw II 2–1 Unia Skierniewice)	
3	Legia Warsaw II	34	19	8	7	70	40	+30	65	
4	GKS Bełchatów	34	16	8	10	58	49	+9	56 (Note: GKS Bełchatów are ahead of Świt Nowy Dwór Mazowieckion head-to-head points: GKS Bełchatów 1–1 Świt Nowy Dwór Mazowiecki, Świt Nowy Dwór Mazowiecki 0–2 GKS Bełchatów)	
5	Świt Nowy Dwór Mazowiecki	34	15	11	8	70	52	+18	56	
6	Lechia Tomaszów Mazowiecki	34	15	8	11	66	54	+12	53	
7	Pelikan Łowicz	34	15	7	12	52	40	+12	52	
8	Broń Radom	34	12	12	10	39	43	−4	48 (Note: Broń Radom are ahead of ŁKS Łomża on head-to-head points: Broń Radom 3–0 ŁKS Łomża, ŁKS Łomża 0–2 Broń Radom)	
9	ŁKS Łomża	34	14	6	14	52	51	+1	48	
10	Warta Sieradz	34	13	5	16	43	48	−5	44	
11	GKS Wikielec	34	11	10	13	37	46	−9	43	
12	Mławianka Mława	34	11	9	14	43	50	−7	42 (Note: Mławianka Mława are drawn with Jagiellonia Białystok II on head-to-head points: Mławianka Mława 3–0 Jagiellonia Białystok II, Jagiellonia Białystok II 3–0 Mławianka Mława)	
13	Jagiellonia Białystok II	34	12	6	16	48	58	−10	42	
14	Victoria Sulejówek	34	11	8	15	41	48	−7	41	
15	Olimpia Zambrów (R)	34	10	10	14	52	48	+4	40	Relegation to IV liga
16	Concordia Elbląg (R)	34	8	6	20	37	98	−61	30	Relegation to IV liga
17	Legionovia Legionowo (R)	34	7	6	21	41	71	−30	27	Relegation to IV liga
18	Pilica Białobrzegi (R)	34	4	7	23	30	89	−59	19	Relegation to IV liga

Source: 90minut.pl
Rules for classification: 1. Number of points reached in the entire series of games; 2. Number of points reached in direct matches; 3. Goal difference in direct matches; 4. Goal difference in direct matches – away goals counted twice; 5. Goal difference in the whole series of games; 6. Number of goals scored in the entire series of games.
(C) Champions; (P) Promoted; (R) Relegated

===== Group 2 =====
Pos	Team	Pld	W	D	L	GF	GA	GD	Pts	Promotion
1	Świt Szczecin (C, P)	34	27	4	3	75	17	+58	85	Promotion to II liga
2	Elana Toruń	34	21	8	5	56	21	+35	71	
3	Unia Swąrzedz	34	19	6	9	66	46	+20	63	
4	Zawisza Bydgoszcz	34	17	7	10	73	38	+35	58	
5	Błękitni Stargard	34	17	4	13	80	62	+18	55	
6	Noteć Czarnków	34	15	5	14	73	63	+10	50 (Note: Noteć Czarnków are ahead of Polonia Środa Wielkopolska and Gedania Gdańsk on head-to-head points: Noteć Czarnków 7, Polonia Środa Wielkopolska 6, Gedania Gdańsk 4)	
7	Polonia Środa Wielkopolska	34	15	5	14	55	61	−6	50	
8	Gedania Gdańsk	34	16	2	16	58	56	+2	50	
9	Pogoń Szczecin II	34	15	4	15	63	60	+3	49 (Note: Pogoń Szczecin II are ahead of Pogoń Nowe Skalmierzyce on head-to-head points: Pogoń Szczecin II 2–0 Pogoń Nowe Skalmierzyce, Pogoń Nowe Skalmierzyce 0–5 Pogoń Szczecin II)	
10	Pogoń Nowe Skalmierzyce	34	14	7	13	56	50	+6	49	
11	Sokół Kleczew	34	14	6	14	59	65	−6	48	
12	Flota Świnoujście	34	14	4	16	45	60	−15	46	
13	Vineta Wolin	34	13	6	15	42	66	−24	45	
14	Cartusia Kartuzy	34	12	8	14	60	51	+9	44	
15	Wikęd Luzino (R)	34	10	4	20	48	71	−23	34	Relegation to IV liga
16	Stolem Gniewino (R)	34	8	9	17	34	58	−24	33	Relegation to IV liga
17	Unia Solec Kujawski (R)	34	7	4	23	40	80	−40	25	Relegation to IV liga
18	KP Starogard Gdański (R)	34	2	7	25	39	97	−58	13	Relegation to IV liga

Source: 90minut.pl
Rules for classification: 1. Number of points reached in the entire series of games; 2. Number of points reached in direct matches; 3. Goal difference in direct matches; 4. Goal difference in direct matches – away goals counted twice; 5. Goal difference in the whole series of games; 6. Number of goals scored in the entire series of games.
(C) Champions; (P) Promoted; (R) Relegated

===== Group 3 =====
Pos	Team	Pld	W	D	L	GF	GA	GD	Pts	Promotion
1	Rekord Bielsko-Biała (P)	34	23	6	5	84	37	+47	75	Promotion to II liga
2	Śląsk Wrocław II	34	21	10	3	76	32	+44	73	
3	MKS Kluczbork	34	17	9	8	55	38	+17	60	
4	Górnik Polkowice	34	16	8	10	56	49	+7	56	
5	Pniówek Pawłowice	34	14	13	7	59	51	+8	55	
6	LKS Goczałkowice-Zdrój	34	12	11	11	50	38	+12	47 (Note: LKS Goczałkowice-Zdrój finished ahead of Górnik Zabrze II on goal difference: LKS Goczałkowice-Zdrój 2–1 Górnik Zabrze II, Górnik Zabrze II 2–1 LKS Goczałkowice-Zdrój)	
7	Górnik Zabrze II	34	14	5	15	54	54	0	47	
8	Ślęza Wrocław	34	12	9	13	60	62	−2	45 (Note: Ślęza Wrocław finished ahead of Stilon Gorzów Wielkopolski on head-to-head goal difference: Ślęza Wrocław 3–1 Stilon Gorzów Wielkopolski, Stilon Gorzów Wielkopolski 1–0 Ślęza Wrocław)	
9	Stilon Gorzów Wielkopolski	34	12	9	13	51	49	+2	45	
10	Lechia Zielona Góra	34	12	7	15	47	57	−10	43	
11	Carina Gubin	34	12	6	16	48	55	−7	42	
12	Karkonosze Jelenia Góra	34	11	8	15	41	53	−12	41 (Note: Karkonosze Jelenia Góra finished ahead of Odra Bytom Odrzański and Unia Turza Śląska on head-to-head points: Karkonosze Jelenia Góra 8, Odra Bytom Odrzański 5, Unia Turza Śląska 2)	
13	Odra Bytom Odrzański	34	9	14	11	39	42	−3	41	
14	Unia Turza Śląska	34	11	8	15	50	56	−6	41	
15	Warta Gorzów Wielkopolski (R)	34	9	12	13	42	58	−16	39	Relegation to IV liga
16	Gwarek Tarnowskie Góry (R)	34	8	9	17	44	58	−14	33	Relegation to IV liga
17	Raków Częstochowa II (R)	34	8	8	18	43	66	−23	32	Relegation to IV liga
18	LZS Starowice Dolne (R)	34	5	8	21	36	80	−44	23	Relegation to IV liga

Source: 90minut.pl
Rules for classification: 1. Number of points reached in the entire series of games; 2. Number of points reached in direct matches; 3. Goal difference in direct matches; 4. Goal difference in direct matches – away goals counted twice; 5. Goal difference in the whole series of games; 6. Number of goals scored in the entire series of games.
(P) Promoted; (R) Relegated

===== Group 4 =====
Pos	Team	Pld	W	D	L	GF	GA	GD	Pts	Promotion
1	Wieczysta Kraków (P)	34	25	3	6	99	35	+64	78	Promotion to II liga
2	Siarka Tarnobrzeg	34	21	7	6	70	30	+40	70	
3	Star Starachowice	34	20	6	8	52	27	+25	66	
4	Avia Świdnik	34	17	6	11	60	41	+19	57	
5	Wiślanie Jaśkowice	34	16	6	12	56	40	+16	54 (Note: Wiślanie Jaśkowice are ahead of Podlasie Biała Podlaska on head-to-head points: Wiślanie Jaśkowice 0–0 Podlasie Biała Podlaska, Podlasie Biała Podlaska 0–2 Wiślanie Jaśkowice)	
6	Podlasie Biała Podlaska	34	15	9	10	47	35	+12	54	
7	Chełmianka Chełm	34	15	6	13	61	58	+3	51	
8	KSZO Ostrowiec Świętokrzyski	34	14	7	13	48	44	+4	49	
9	Czarni Połaniec	34	13	9	12	58	54	+4	48	
10	Garbarnia Kraków	34	12	10	12	49	58	−9	46	
11	Wisłoka Dębica	34	12	9	13	41	53	−12	45	
12	Świdniczanka Świdnik	34	11	11	12	43	47	−4	44	
13	KS Wiązownica	34	12	7	15	55	73	−18	43	
14	Podhale Nowy Targ	34	9	12	13	38	40	−2	39	
15	Unia Tarnów (R)	34	10	6	18	51	66	−15	36	Relegation to IV liga
16	Karpaty Krosno (R)	34	6	7	21	26	67	−41	25	Relegation to IV liga
17	Orlęta Radzyń Podlaski (R)	34	5	9	20	32	61	−29	24	Relegation to IV liga
18	Sokół Sieniawa (R)	34	7	2	25	38	95	−57	23	Relegation to IV liga

Source: 90minut.pl
Rules for classification: 1. Number of points reached in the entire series of games; 2. Number of points reached in direct matches; 3. Goal difference in direct matches; 4. Goal difference in direct matches – away goals counted twice; 5. Goal difference in the whole series of games; 6. Number of goals scored in the entire series of games.
(P) Promoted; (R) Relegated

=== Cup competitions ===
==== Polish Cup ====
2 May 2024
16:00 CEST (UTC+02:00)

Pogoń Szczecin	1–2 (a.e.t.)	Wisła Kraków
Koulouris 75'	90minut Łączy nas piłka	Satrústegui 90+9'; Rodado 93'

PGE Narodowy, Warsaw
Attendance: 47,506
Referee: Tomasz Kwiatkowski (Warsaw)

==== Polish SuperCup ====
15 July 2023
20:10 CEST (UTC+02:00)

Raków Częstochowa	0–0	Legia Warsaw
	Report
Penalties
Tudor (penalty scored); Zwoliński (penalty scored); Cebula (penalty missed); Rundić (penalty scored); Papanikolaou (penalty scored); Lederman (penalty scored); Jean Carlos (penalty missed)	5–6	(penalty scored) Slisz; (penalty scored) Augustyniak; (penalty scored) Kramer; (penalty missed) Rosołek; (penalty scored) Josué; (penalty scored) Gual; (penalty scored) Nawrocki

Miejski Stadion Piłkarski "Raków", Częstochowa
Attendance: 5,500
Referee: Szymon Marciniak (Płock)

== UEFA competitions ==
=== UEFA Champions League ===
==== Qualifying phase and play-off round ====
===== First qualifying round =====
Team 1	Agg.	Team 2	1st leg	2nd leg
Raków Częstochowa (Poland)	4–0	(Estonia) Flora	1–0	3–0

===== Second qualifying round =====
Team 1	Agg.	Team 2	1st leg	2nd leg
Raków Częstochowa (Poland)	4–3	(Azerbaijan) Qarabağ	3–2	1–1

===== Third qualifying round =====
Team 1	Agg.	Team 2	1st leg	2nd leg
Raków Częstochowa (Poland)	3–1	(Cyprus) Aris Limassol	2–1	1–0

===== Play-off round =====
Team 1	Agg.	Team 2	1st leg	2nd leg
Raków Częstochowa (Poland)	1–2	(Denmark) Copenhagen	0–1	1–1

=== UEFA Europa League ===
==== Group stage ====
===== Group D =====
Pos	Team	Pld	W	D	L	GF	GA	GD	Pts	Qualification	ATA	SCP	STU	RAK
1	(Italy) Atalanta	6	4	2	0	12	4	+8	14	Advance to round of 16	—	1–1	1–0	2–0
2	(Portugal) Sporting CP	6	3	2	1	10	6	+4	11	Advance to knockout round play-offs	1–2	—	3–0	2–1
3	(Austria) Sturm Graz	6	1	1	4	4	9	−5	4 (Note: Tied on head-to-head results. Overall goal difference used as a tiebreaker.)	Transfer to Europa Conference League	2–2	1–2	—	0–1
4	(Poland) Raków Częstochowa	6	1	1	4	3	10	−7	4		0–4	1–1	0–1	—

Source: UEFA

=== UEFA Europa Conference League ===
==== Qualifying phase and play-off round ====
===== Second qualifying round =====
Team 1	Agg.	Team 2	1st leg	2nd leg
Ordabasy (Kazakhstan)	4–5	(Poland) Legia Warsaw	2–2	2–3
Lech Poznań (Poland)	5–2	(Lithuania) Kauno Žalgiris	3–1	2–1
Linfield (Northern Ireland)	4–8	(Poland) Pogoń Szczecin	2–5	2–3

===== Third qualifying round =====
Team 1	Agg.	Team 2	1st leg	2nd leg
Legia Warsaw (Poland)	6–5	Austria Wien	1–2	5–3
Gent (Belgium)	6–2	(Poland) Pogoń Szczecin	5–0	1–2
Lech Poznań (Poland)	3–4	(Slovakia) Spartak Trnava	2–1	1–3

===== Play-off round =====
Team 1	Agg.	Team 2	1st leg	2nd leg
Midtjylland (Denmark)	4–4 (5–6 p)	(Poland) Legia Warsaw	3–3	1–1 (a.e.t.)

==== Group stage ====
===== Group E =====
Pos	Team	Pld	W	D	L	GF	GA	GD	Pts	Qualification	AVL	LEG	AZ	ZRI
1	(England) Aston Villa	6	4	1	1	12	7	+5	13	Advance to round of 16	—	2–1	2–1	1–0
2	(Poland) Legia Warsaw	6	4	0	2	10	6	+4	12	Advance to knockout round play-offs	3–2	—	2–0	2–0
3	(Netherlands) AZ	6	2	0	4	7	12	−5	6		1–4	1–0	—	1–0
4	(Bosnia and Herzegovina) Zrinjski Mostar	6	1	1	4	6	10	−4	4		1–1	1–2	4–3	—

Source: UEFA

==== Knockout phase ====
===== Knockout round play-offs =====
Team 1	Agg.	Team 2	1st leg	2nd leg
Molde (Norway)	6–2	(Poland) Legia Warsaw	3–2	3–0

== National teams ==
=== Poland national football team ===
==== Results and fixtures ====
===== Friendlies =====
21 November 2023 Friendly	Poland	2–0	Latvia	Warsaw, Poland
20:45 CET (UTC+1)	Frankowski 7'; Lewandowski 49'	Report		Stadium: PGE Narodowy; Attendance: 31,000; Referee: Ondrej Berka (Czech Republic)

===== UEFA Euro 2024 qualifying =====
====== Group E ======
Pos	Team	Pld	W	D	L	GF	GA	GD	Pts	Qualification	(Albania)	(Czech Republic)	(Poland)	(Moldova)	(Faroe Islands)
1	Albania	8	4	3	1	12	4	+8	15 (Note: Head to head points: Albania 4, Czech Republic 1.)	Qualify for final tournament	—	3–0	2–0	2–0	0–0
2	Czech Republic	8	4	3	1	12	6	+6	15	Qualify for final tournament	1–1	—	3–1	3–0	1–0
3	Poland	8	3	2	3	10	10	0	11	Advance to play-offs via Nations League	1–0	1–1	—	1–1	2–0
4	Moldova	8	2	4	2	7	10	−3	10		1–1	0–0	3–2	—	1–1
5	Faroe Islands	8	0	2	6	2	13	−11	2		1–3	0–3	0–2	0–1	—

Source: UEFA
Rules for classification: Qualification tiebreakers
Notes:

7 September 2023 UEFA Euro 2024 qualifying	Poland	2–0	Faroe Islands	Warsaw, Poland
20:45 CEST (UTC+02:00)	Lewandowski 73' (pen.), 83'	Report		Stadium: PGE Narodowy; Attendance: 54,129; Referee: David Šmajc (Slovenia)

10 September 2023 UEFA Euro 2024 qualifying	Albania	2–0	Poland	Tirana, Albania
20:45 CEST (UTC+02:00)	Asani 37'; Daku 62'	Report		Stadium: Arena Kombëtare; Attendance: 21,900; Referee: José María Sánchez Martínez (Spain)

12 October 2023 UEFA Euro 2024 qualifying	Faroe Islands	0–2	Poland	Tórshavn, Faroe Islands
20:45 CEST (UTC+02:00)		Report	S. Szymański 4'; Buksa 65'	Stadium: Tórsvøllur; Attendance: 3,220; Referee: Allard Lindhout (Netherlands)

15 October 2023 UEFA Euro 2024 qualifying	Poland	1–1	Moldova	Warsaw, Poland
20:45 CEST (UTC+02:00)	Świderski 53'	Report	Nicolaescu 26'	Stadium: PGE Narodowy; Attendance: 51,672; Referee: Artur Soares Dias (Portugal)

17 November 2023 UEFA Euro 2024 qualifying	Poland	1–1	Czech Republic	Warsaw, Poland
20:45 CET (UTC+01:00)	Piotrowski 38'	Report	Souček 49'	Stadium: PGE Narodowy; Attendance: 56,310; Referee: Daniele Orsato (Italy)

====== Play-offs ======
21 March 2024 Play-offs semi-final	Poland	5–1	Estonia	Warsaw, Poland
20:45 CET (UTC+01:00)	Frankowski 22'; Zieliński 50'; Piotrowski 70'; Mets 74' (o.g.); S. Szymański 76'	Report	Vetkal 78'	Stadium: PGE Narodowy; Attendance: 53,868; Referee: Slavko Vinčić (Slovenia)

26 March 2024 Play-offs final	Wales	0–0 (a.e.t.) (4–5 p)	Poland	Cardiff, Wales
20:45 CET (UTC+01:00)		Report		Stadium: Cardiff City Stadium; Attendance: 31,876; Referee: Daniele Orsato (Italy)
	Penalties
	B. Davies (penalty scored); Moore (penalty scored); Wilson (penalty scored); Williams (penalty scored); D. James (penalty missed)		(penalty scored) Lewandowski; (penalty scored) S. Szymański; (penalty scored) Frankowski; (penalty scored) Zalewski; (penalty scored) Piątek

===== UEFA Euro 2024 =====
====== Group D ======
Pos	Team	Pld	W	D	L	GF	GA	GD	Pts	Qualification
1	Austria	3	2	0	1	6	4	+2	6	Advance to knockout stage
2	France	3	1	2	0	2	1	+1	5	Advance to knockout stage
3	Netherlands	3	1	1	1	4	4	0	4	Advance to knockout stage
4	Poland	3	0	1	2	3	6	−3	1	

Source: UEFA

16 June 2024	Poland	1–2	Netherlands	Hamburg, Germany
15:00 CEST (UTC+02:00)	Buksa 16'	Report	Gakpo 29'; Weghorst 83'	Stadium: Volksparkstadion; Attendance: 48,117; Referee: Artur Soares Dias (Portugal)

21 June 2024	Poland	1–3	Austria	Berlin, Germany
18:00 CEST (UTC+02:00)	Piątek 30'	Report	Trauner 9'; Baumgartner 66'; Arnautović 78' (pen.)	Stadium: Olympiastadion; Attendance: 69,455; Referee: Halil Umut Meler (Turkey)

25 June 2024	France	1–1	Poland	Dortmund, Germany
18:00 CEST (UTC+02:00)	Mbappé 56' (pen.)	Report	Lewandowski 79' (pen.)	Stadium: BVB Stadion Dortmund; Attendance: 59,728; Referee: Marco Guida (Italy)
