= Wolsky =

Wolsky is a surname. Notable people with the surname include:

- Albert Wolsky (1930–2026), French-born American costume designer
- Milton Wolsky (1916–1981), American painter and illustrator

== See also ==
- Wolski
