= 2023–24 III liga =

III liga
- Season: 2023–24
- Dates: 4 August 2023 – 8 June 2024
- Champions: Pogoń Grodzisk Mazowiecki; Świt Szczecin; Rekord Bielsko-Biała; Wieczysta Kraków
- Promoted: Pogoń Grodzisk Mazowiecki; Świt Szczecin; Rekord Bielsko-Biała; Wieczysta Kraków
- Matches: 1,224
- Goals: 3,844 (3.14 per match)
- Top goalscorer: (Poland) Wiktor Kacprzak (32 goals)

The 2023–24 III liga season was the 16th edition of the fourth tier domestic division in the Polish football league system since its establishment in 2008 under its current title (III liga) and the 7th season under its current league division format. The league was operated by the Polish Football Association (PZPN).

The competition is contested by 72 clubs split geographically across 4 groups of 18 teams, with the winners of each group gaining promotion to the II liga. The season is played in a round-robin tournament. It will begin on 5 August 2023 and will conclude on 9 June 2024. The teams included semi-professional clubs (although a few are professional) and the reserve teams of professional clubs.

== Format ==
Geographical criteria.

72 teams were divided into four groups according to geographical criteria:

- Group I (Łódź – Masovian – Podlaskie – Warmian-Masurian)
- Group II (Kuyavian-Pomeranian – Greater Poland – Pomeranian – West Pomeranian)
- Group III (Lower Silesian – Lubusz – Opole – Silesian)
- Group IV (Świętokrzyskie – Lesser Poland – Lublin – Podkarpackie)

Since 2021–22 season each group of III liga was operated by Polish Football Association (PZPN), not a different voivodship football association.

Location of teams and stadiums in 2023–24 III liga. Red: Group I, Green: Group II, Yellow: Group III, Blue: Group IV

== Changes from last season ==
The following teams have changed division since the 2022–23 season.

=== To III liga ===
| Relegated from 2022–23 II liga | ▼ Garbarnia Kraków ▼ Górnik Polkowice ▼ Siarka Tarnobrzeg ▼ Śląsk Wrocław II | Promoted from 2022–23 IV liga | Group 1 ▲GKS Bełchatów ▲ Victoria Sulejówek ▲GKS Wikielec ▲ ŁKS Łomża | Group 2 ▲ Elana Toruń ▲ Wikęd Luzino ▲ Noteć Czarnków ▲ Flota Świnoujście | Group 3 ▲ Karkonosze Jelenia Góra ▲ Odra Bytom Odrzański ▲LZS Starowice Dolne ▲ Unia Turza Śląska | Group 4 ▲Świdniczanka Świdnik ▲ Wiślanie Jaśkowice ▲ Karpaty Krosno ▲ Star Starachowice |

=== From III liga ===
| Promoted to 2023–24 II liga | ▲ ŁKS Łódź II ▲ Olimpia Grudziądz ▲ Polonia Bytom ▲ Stal Stalowa Wola | Relegated to 2023–24 IV liga | Group 1 ▼ Sokół Ostróda ▼ Błonianka Błonie ▼ Ursus Warsaw ▼ Znicz Biała Piska ▼ Sokół Aleksandrów Łódzki ▼ Wissa Szczuczyn | Group 2 ▼ Jarota Jarocin ▼ Bałtyk Gdynia ▼ Unia Janikowo ▼ Flota Świnoujście | Group 3 ▼ Stal Brzeg ▼ Polonia Nysa ▼ Miedź Legnica II ▼ Odra Wodzisław Śląski ▼ Chrobry Głogów II | Group 4 ▼ Cracovia II ▼ Korona Kielce II ▼ Wisła Sandomierz ▼ Lublinianka Lublin ▼ ŁKS Łagów |

== League tables ==
=== Group 1 ===
III liga Group 1
- Season: 2023–24
- Dates: 5 August 2023 – 8 June 2024
- Champions: Pogoń Grodzisk Mazowiecki
- Promoted: Pogoń Grodzisk Mazowiecki
- Relegated: Pilica Białobrzegi; Legionovia Legionowo; Concordia Elbląg; Olimpia Zambrów
- Matches: 306
- Goals: 963 (3.15 per match)
- Top goalscorer: (Poland) Kamil Sabiłło (26 goals)

| Pos | Team | Pld | W | D | L | GF | GA | GD | Pts | Promotion |
|---|---|---|---|---|---|---|---|---|---|---|
| 1 | Pogoń Grodzisk Mazowiecki (C, P) | 34 | 23 | 7 | 4 | 106 | 32 | +74 | 76 | Promotion to II liga |
| 2 | Unia Skierniewice | 34 | 19 | 8 | 7 | 78 | 46 | +32 | 65 (Note: Unia Skierniewice are ahead of Legia Warsaw II on head-to-head points: Unia Skierniewice 4–0 Legia Warsaw II, Legia Warsaw II 2–1 Unia Skierniewice) | |
| 3 | Legia Warsaw II | 34 | 19 | 8 | 7 | 70 | 40 | +30 | 65 | |
| 4 | GKS Bełchatów | 34 | 16 | 8 | 10 | 58 | 49 | +9 | 56 (Note: GKS Bełchatów are ahead of Świt Nowy Dwór Mazowieckion head-to-head points: GKS Bełchatów 1–1 Świt Nowy Dwór Mazowiecki, Świt Nowy Dwór Mazowiecki 0–2 GKS Bełchatów) | |
| 5 | Świt Nowy Dwór Mazowiecki | 34 | 15 | 11 | 8 | 70 | 52 | +18 | 56 | |
| 6 | Lechia Tomaszów Mazowiecki | 34 | 15 | 8 | 11 | 66 | 54 | +12 | 53 | |
| 7 | Pelikan Łowicz | 34 | 15 | 7 | 12 | 52 | 40 | +12 | 52 | |
| 8 | Broń Radom | 34 | 12 | 12 | 10 | 39 | 43 | −4 | 48 (Note: Broń Radom are ahead of ŁKS Łomża on head-to-head points: Broń Radom 3–0 ŁKS Łomża, ŁKS Łomża 0–2 Broń Radom) | |
| 9 | ŁKS Łomża | 34 | 14 | 6 | 14 | 52 | 51 | +1 | 48 | |
| 10 | Warta Sieradz | 34 | 13 | 5 | 16 | 43 | 48 | −5 | 44 | |
| 11 | GKS Wikielec | 34 | 11 | 10 | 13 | 37 | 46 | −9 | 43 | |
| 12 | Mławianka Mława | 34 | 11 | 9 | 14 | 43 | 50 | −7 | 42 (Note: Mławianka Mława are drawn with Jagiellonia Białystok II on head-to-head points: Mławianka Mława 3–0 Jagiellonia Białystok II, Jagiellonia Białystok II 3–0 Mławianka Mława) | |
| 13 | Jagiellonia Białystok II | 34 | 12 | 6 | 16 | 48 | 58 | −10 | 42 | |
| 14 | Victoria Sulejówek | 34 | 11 | 8 | 15 | 41 | 48 | −7 | 41 | |
| 15 | Olimpia Zambrów (R) | 34 | 10 | 10 | 14 | 52 | 48 | +4 | 40 | Relegation to IV liga |
| 16 | Concordia Elbląg (R) | 34 | 8 | 6 | 20 | 37 | 98 | −61 | 30 | Relegation to IV liga |
| 17 | Legionovia Legionowo (R) | 34 | 7 | 6 | 21 | 41 | 71 | −30 | 27 | Relegation to IV liga |
| 18 | Pilica Białobrzegi (R) | 34 | 4 | 7 | 23 | 30 | 89 | −59 | 19 | Relegation to IV liga |

Source: 90minut.pl
Rules for classification: 1. Number of points reached in the entire series of games; 2. Number of points reached in direct matches; 3. Goal difference in direct matches; 4. Goal difference in direct matches – away goals counted twice; 5. Goal difference in the whole series of games; 6. Number of goals scored in the entire series of games.
(C) Champions; (P) Promoted; (R) Relegated

=== Group 2 ===
III liga Group 2
- Season: 2023–24
- Dates: 4 August 2023 – 8 June 2024
- Champions: Świt Szczecin
- Promoted: Świt Szczecin
- Relegated: KP Starogard Gdański; Unia Solec Kujawski; Stolem Gniewino; Wikęd Luzino
- Matches: 306
- Goals: 1,022 (3.34 per match)
- Top goalscorer: (Poland) Wiktor Kacprzak (32 goals)
- Highest attendance: 3,290; Zawisza 0–0 Elana (12 August 2023)

| Pos | Team | Pld | W | D | L | GF | GA | GD | Pts | Promotion |
|---|---|---|---|---|---|---|---|---|---|---|
| 1 | Świt Szczecin (C, P) | 34 | 27 | 4 | 3 | 75 | 17 | +58 | 85 | Promotion to II liga |
| 2 | Elana Toruń | 34 | 21 | 8 | 5 | 56 | 21 | +35 | 71 | |
| 3 | Unia Swąrzedz | 34 | 19 | 6 | 9 | 66 | 46 | +20 | 63 | |
| 4 | Zawisza Bydgoszcz | 34 | 17 | 7 | 10 | 73 | 38 | +35 | 58 | |
| 5 | Błękitni Stargard | 34 | 17 | 4 | 13 | 80 | 62 | +18 | 55 | |
| 6 | Noteć Czarnków | 34 | 15 | 5 | 14 | 73 | 63 | +10 | 50 (Note: Noteć Czarnków are ahead of Polonia Środa Wielkopolska and Gedania Gdańsk on head-to-head points: Noteć Czarnków 7, Polonia Środa Wielkopolska 6, Gedania Gdańsk 4) | |
| 7 | Polonia Środa Wielkopolska | 34 | 15 | 5 | 14 | 55 | 61 | −6 | 50 | |
| 8 | Gedania Gdańsk | 34 | 16 | 2 | 16 | 58 | 56 | +2 | 50 | |
| 9 | Pogoń Szczecin II | 34 | 15 | 4 | 15 | 63 | 60 | +3 | 49 (Note: Pogoń Szczecin II are ahead of Pogoń Nowe Skalmierzyce on head-to-head points: Pogoń Szczecin II 2–0 Pogoń Nowe Skalmierzyce, Pogoń Nowe Skalmierzyce 0–5 Pogoń Szczecin II) | |
| 10 | Pogoń Nowe Skalmierzyce | 34 | 14 | 7 | 13 | 56 | 50 | +6 | 49 | |
| 11 | Sokół Kleczew | 34 | 14 | 6 | 14 | 59 | 65 | −6 | 48 | |
| 12 | Flota Świnoujście | 34 | 14 | 4 | 16 | 45 | 60 | −15 | 46 | |
| 13 | Vineta Wolin | 34 | 13 | 6 | 15 | 42 | 66 | −24 | 45 | |
| 14 | Cartusia Kartuzy | 34 | 12 | 8 | 14 | 60 | 51 | +9 | 44 | |
| 15 | Wikęd Luzino (R) | 34 | 10 | 4 | 20 | 48 | 71 | −23 | 34 | Relegation to IV liga |
| 16 | Stolem Gniewino (R) | 34 | 8 | 9 | 17 | 34 | 58 | −24 | 33 | Relegation to IV liga |
| 17 | Unia Solec Kujawski (R) | 34 | 7 | 4 | 23 | 40 | 80 | −40 | 25 | Relegation to IV liga |
| 18 | KP Starogard Gdański (R) | 34 | 2 | 7 | 25 | 39 | 97 | −58 | 13 | Relegation to IV liga |

Source: 90minut.pl
Rules for classification: 1. Number of points reached in the entire series of games; 2. Number of points reached in direct matches; 3. Goal difference in direct matches; 4. Goal difference in direct matches – away goals counted twice; 5. Goal difference in the whole series of games; 6. Number of goals scored in the entire series of games.
(C) Champions; (P) Promoted; (R) Relegated

=== Group 3 ===
III liga Group 3
- Season: 2023–24
- Dates: 5 August 2023 – 8 June 2024
- Champions: Rekord Bielsko-Biała
- Promoted: Rekord Bielsko-Biała
- Relegated: LZS Starowice Dolne; Raków Częstochowa II; Gwarek Tarnowskie Góry; Warta Gorzów Wielkopolski
- Matches: 306
- Goals: 935 (3.06 per match)
- Top goalscorer: (Poland) Daniel Świderski (31 goals)

| Pos | Team | Pld | W | D | L | GF | GA | GD | Pts | Promotion |
|---|---|---|---|---|---|---|---|---|---|---|
| 1 | Rekord Bielsko-Biała (P) | 34 | 23 | 6 | 5 | 84 | 37 | +47 | 75 | Promotion to II liga |
| 2 | Śląsk Wrocław II | 34 | 21 | 10 | 3 | 76 | 32 | +44 | 73 | |
| 3 | MKS Kluczbork | 34 | 17 | 9 | 8 | 55 | 38 | +17 | 60 | |
| 4 | Górnik Polkowice | 34 | 16 | 8 | 10 | 56 | 49 | +7 | 56 | |
| 5 | Pniówek Pawłowice | 34 | 14 | 13 | 7 | 59 | 51 | +8 | 55 | |
| 6 | LKS Goczałkowice-Zdrój | 34 | 12 | 11 | 11 | 50 | 38 | +12 | 47 (Note: LKS Goczałkowice-Zdrój finished ahead of Górnik Zabrze II on goal difference: LKS Goczałkowice-Zdrój 2–1 Górnik Zabrze II, Górnik Zabrze II 2–1 LKS Goczałkowice-Zdrój) | |
| 7 | Górnik Zabrze II | 34 | 14 | 5 | 15 | 54 | 54 | 0 | 47 | |
| 8 | Ślęza Wrocław | 34 | 12 | 9 | 13 | 60 | 62 | −2 | 45 (Note: Ślęza Wrocław finished ahead of Stilon Gorzów Wielkopolski on head-to-head goal difference: Ślęza Wrocław 3–1 Stilon Gorzów Wielkopolski, Stilon Gorzów Wielkopolski 1–0 Ślęza Wrocław) | |
| 9 | Stilon Gorzów Wielkopolski | 34 | 12 | 9 | 13 | 51 | 49 | +2 | 45 | |
| 10 | Lechia Zielona Góra | 34 | 12 | 7 | 15 | 47 | 57 | −10 | 43 | |
| 11 | Carina Gubin | 34 | 12 | 6 | 16 | 48 | 55 | −7 | 42 | |
| 12 | Karkonosze Jelenia Góra | 34 | 11 | 8 | 15 | 41 | 53 | −12 | 41 (Note: Karkonosze Jelenia Góra finished ahead of Odra Bytom Odrzański and Unia Turza Śląska on head-to-head points: Karkonosze Jelenia Góra 8, Odra Bytom Odrzański 5, Unia Turza Śląska 2) | |
| 13 | Odra Bytom Odrzański | 34 | 9 | 14 | 11 | 39 | 42 | −3 | 41 | |
| 14 | Unia Turza Śląska | 34 | 11 | 8 | 15 | 50 | 56 | −6 | 41 | |
| 15 | Warta Gorzów Wielkopolski (R) | 34 | 9 | 12 | 13 | 42 | 58 | −16 | 39 | Relegation to IV liga |
| 16 | Gwarek Tarnowskie Góry (R) | 34 | 8 | 9 | 17 | 44 | 58 | −14 | 33 | Relegation to IV liga |
| 17 | Raków Częstochowa II (R) | 34 | 8 | 8 | 18 | 43 | 66 | −23 | 32 | Relegation to IV liga |
| 18 | LZS Starowice Dolne (R) | 34 | 5 | 8 | 21 | 36 | 80 | −44 | 23 | Relegation to IV liga |

Source: 90minut.pl
Rules for classification: 1. Number of points reached in the entire series of games; 2. Number of points reached in direct matches; 3. Goal difference in direct matches; 4. Goal difference in direct matches – away goals counted twice; 5. Goal difference in the whole series of games; 6. Number of goals scored in the entire series of games.
(P) Promoted; (R) Relegated

=== Group 4 ===
III liga Group 4
- Season: 2023–24
- Dates: 4 August 2023 – 8 June 2024
- Champions: Wieczysta Kraków
- Promoted: Wieczysta Kraków
- Relegated: Sokół Sieniawa; Orlęta Radzyń Podlaski; Karpaty Krosno; Unia Tarnów
- Matches: 306
- Goals: 924 (3.02 per match)
- Top goalscorer: (Poland) Bartłomiej Korbecki (20 goals)
- Highest attendance: 3,500; Karpaty 1–0 Wieczysta (4 August 2023)

| Pos | Team | Pld | W | D | L | GF | GA | GD | Pts | Promotion |
|---|---|---|---|---|---|---|---|---|---|---|
| 1 | Wieczysta Kraków (P) | 34 | 25 | 3 | 6 | 99 | 35 | +64 | 78 | Promotion to II liga |
| 2 | Siarka Tarnobrzeg | 34 | 21 | 7 | 6 | 70 | 30 | +40 | 70 | |
| 3 | Star Starachowice | 34 | 20 | 6 | 8 | 52 | 27 | +25 | 66 | |
| 4 | Avia Świdnik | 34 | 17 | 6 | 11 | 60 | 41 | +19 | 57 | |
| 5 | Wiślanie Jaśkowice | 34 | 16 | 6 | 12 | 56 | 40 | +16 | 54 (Note: Wiślanie Jaśkowice are ahead of Podlasie Biała Podlaska on head-to-head points: Wiślanie Jaśkowice 0–0 Podlasie Biała Podlaska, Podlasie Biała Podlaska 0–2 Wiślanie Jaśkowice) | |
| 6 | Podlasie Biała Podlaska | 34 | 15 | 9 | 10 | 47 | 35 | +12 | 54 | |
| 7 | Chełmianka Chełm | 34 | 15 | 6 | 13 | 61 | 58 | +3 | 51 | |
| 8 | KSZO Ostrowiec Świętokrzyski | 34 | 14 | 7 | 13 | 48 | 44 | +4 | 49 | |
| 9 | Czarni Połaniec | 34 | 13 | 9 | 12 | 58 | 54 | +4 | 48 | |
| 10 | Garbarnia Kraków | 34 | 12 | 10 | 12 | 49 | 58 | −9 | 46 | |
| 11 | Wisłoka Dębica | 34 | 12 | 9 | 13 | 41 | 53 | −12 | 45 | |
| 12 | Świdniczanka Świdnik | 34 | 11 | 11 | 12 | 43 | 47 | −4 | 44 | |
| 13 | KS Wiązownica | 34 | 12 | 7 | 15 | 55 | 73 | −18 | 43 | |
| 14 | Podhale Nowy Targ | 34 | 9 | 12 | 13 | 38 | 40 | −2 | 39 | |
| 15 | Unia Tarnów (R) | 34 | 10 | 6 | 18 | 51 | 66 | −15 | 36 | Relegation to IV liga |
| 16 | Karpaty Krosno (R) | 34 | 6 | 7 | 21 | 26 | 67 | −41 | 25 | Relegation to IV liga |
| 17 | Orlęta Radzyń Podlaski (R) | 34 | 5 | 9 | 20 | 32 | 61 | −29 | 24 | Relegation to IV liga |
| 18 | Sokół Sieniawa (R) | 34 | 7 | 2 | 25 | 38 | 95 | −57 | 23 | Relegation to IV liga |

Source: 90minut.pl
Rules for classification: 1. Number of points reached in the entire series of games; 2. Number of points reached in direct matches; 3. Goal difference in direct matches; 4. Goal difference in direct matches – away goals counted twice; 5. Goal difference in the whole series of games; 6. Number of goals scored in the entire series of games.
(P) Promoted; (R) Relegated

== See also ==
- 2023–24 Ekstraklasa
- 2023–24 I liga
- 2023–24 II liga
- 2023–24 Polish Cup
