= Wolski =

Wolski (feminine: Wolska, plural: Wolscy) is a Polish locational surname, which refers to a person from one of the numerous places called Wola in Poland. Variants of the name include Volski, Volsky, and Wolsky. The surname may refer to:

- Albert Wolsky (1930–2026), French-born American costume designer
- Bartosz Wolski (canoeist) (born 1980), American sprint canoeist
- Bartosz Wolski (footballer) (born 1997), Polish footballer
- Bill Wolski (1944–2006), American football player
- Dariusz Wolski (born 1956), Polish cinematographer
- Dominika Wolski (born 1975), Canadian actress
- Jacek Saryusz-Wolski (born 1948), Polish politician
- Maciej Wolski (born 1997), Polish footballer
- Marcin Wolski (born 1947), Polish writer
- Maryla Wolska (1873–1930), Polish poet
- Mikołaj Wolski (1553–1630), Polish government official
- Milton Wolsky (1916–1981), American painter and illustrator
- Patryk Wolski (born 1993), Polish footballer
- Piotr Wolyniec (formerly Piotr Wolski, 1889–1949) Polish landowner and government official
- Rafał Wolski (born 1992), Polish footballer
- Robert Wolski (1982–2026), Polish high jumper
- Victor J. Wolski (born 1962), American judge
- Władysław Wolski (1923–1991), Polish civil servant and politician
- Włodzimierz Wolski (1824–1882), Polish writer
- Wojtek Wolski (born 1986), Canadian ice hockey player
- Xawery Wolski (born 1960), Polish artist

== See also ==
- Volsky (disambiguation)
