= Volesky =

Volesky (Волескі or Волеський) is a surname of Belarusian and Ukrainian origin. People with this surname include:

- Ron J. Volesky (born 1955), American lawyer and politician
- Gary J. Volesky (born 1961), U.S. Army commander
- Christian Volesky (born 1992), American professional soccer player

== See also ==
- Volsky (disambiguation)
- Wolski
