= Krzysztof Sokalski =

Polish footballer (born 1986)

Personal information
- Date of birth: 13 August 1986 (age 40)
- Place of birth: Łódź, Poland
- Height: 1.93 m (6 ft 4 in)
- Position: Striker

Senior career*
| Years | Team | Apps | (Gls) |
| –2004 | ŁKS Łódź II | | |
| 2004–2005 | Włókniarz Konstantynów Łódzki | | |
| 2005–2006 | Górnik Łęczyca | | |
| 2006–2008 | Widzew Łódź | 31 | (4) |

International career
| 2007 | Poland U21 | 4 | (0) |
- * Club domestic league appearances and goals

Krzysztof Sokalski (born 13 August 1986) is a Polish former professional footballer who played as a striker. He was a member of the Poland U21 team. He retired from football at the age of 22 for undisclosed reasons.

== Career ==
Sokalski was born in Łódź, Poland, and played as a striker. A tall forward at 193 cm, he began his football journey in the youth ranks of ŁKS Łódź and later featured for Włókniarz Konstantynów Łódzki and Górnik Łęczyca.

In 2006 he joined Widzew Łódź, where he made 31 appearances in the Ekstraklasa and I liga, scoring four goals across two seasons. In 2008, aged 21, he was placed on the transfer list by Widzew and shortly afterwards retired from professional football.
