= 2023–24 I liga =

76th season of the second tier football league in Poland

I liga
- Season: 2023–24
- Dates: 21 July 2023 – 26 May 2024
- Champions: Lechia Gdańsk
- Promoted: Lechia Gdańsk; GKS Katowice; Motor Lublin
- Relegated: Zagłębie Sosnowiec; Podbeskidzie Bielsko-Biała; Resovia Rzeszów
- Europa League: Wisła Kraków (Note: As the 2023–24 Polish Cup winner.)
- Matches: 306
- Goals: 814 (2.66 per match)
- Top goalscorer: Ángel Rodado (22 goals)
- Biggest home win: Katowice 8–0 Stal (4 May 2024)
- Biggest away win: Chrobry 0–5 Bruk-Bet Termalica (5 August 2023)
- Highest scoring: Wisła K. 6–2 Znicz (7 October 2023); Katowice 8–0 Stal (4 May 2024)
- Longest winning run: 7 matches Arka Gdynia
- Longest unbeaten run: 12 matches Górnik Łęczna
- Longest winless run: 26 matches Zagłębie Sosnowiec
- Longest losing run: 7 matches Zagłębie Sosnowiec
- Highest attendance: 36,483; Lechia 2–1 Arka (19 May 2024)
- Lowest attendance: 200 (Note: Match played at the GIEKSA Arena in Bełchatów.); Odra 1–1 Stal (10 December 2023)
- Total attendance: 1,354,168
- Average attendance: 4,425 ▲25.5%

The 2023–24 I liga (also known as Fortuna I liga due to sponsorship reasons) was the 76th season of the second tier domestic division in the Polish football league system since its establishment in 1949 and the 16th season of the Polish I liga under its current title. The league was operated by the PZPN.

The regular season was being played as a round-robin tournament. A total of 18 teams participate, 12 of which competed in the league campaign during the previous season, while three to be relegated from the 2022–23 Ekstraklasa and the remaining three to be promoted from the 2022–23 II liga. The season started on 21 July 2023 and will conclude on 26 May 2024. Each team will play a total of 34 matches, half at home and half away.

== Teams ==
A total of 18 teams participate in the 2023–24 I liga season.

=== Changes from last season ===
The following teams have changed division since the 2022–23 season.

==== To I liga ====
Relegated from 2022–23 Ekstraklasa	Promoted from 2022–23 II liga
▼ Wisła Płock ▼ Lechia Gdańsk ▼ Miedź Legnica	▲ Polonia Warsaw ▲ Znicz Pruszków ▲ Motor Lublin

==== From I liga ====
Promoted to 2023–24 Ekstraklasa	Relegated to 2023–24 II liga
▲ ŁKS Łódź ▲ Ruch Chorzów ▲ Puszcza Niepołomice	▼ Skra Częstochowa ▼ Sandecja Nowy Sącz ▼ Chojniczanka Chojnice

=== Stadiums and locations ===
Location of teams in 2023–24 I liga.
Location of teams in the Metropolis GZM in 2023–24 I liga.

Note: Table lists in alphabetical order.

Team	Location	Venue	Capacity
Arka Gdynia	Gdynia	Stadion GOSiR	15,139
Bruk-Bet Termalica Nieciecza	Nieciecza	Stadion Bruk-Bet	4,666
Chrobry Głogów	Głogów	Stadion GOS	2,817
GKS Katowice	Katowice	Stadion GKS Katowice	6,710
GKS Tychy	Tychy	Stadion Tychy	15,150
Górnik Łęczna	Łęczna	Stadion Górnika Łęczna	7,464
Lechia Gdańsk	Gdańsk	Polsat Plus Arena Gdańsk	43,615
Miedź Legnica	Legnica	Stadion Orła Białego	6,864
Motor Lublin	Lublin	Arena Lublin	15,245
Odra Opole	Opole	Stadion Odry; GIEKSA Arena^{1}	4,560; 5,264
Podbeskidzie Bielsko-Biała	Bielsko-Biała	Stadion BBOSiR	15,076
Polonia Warsaw	Warsaw	Stadion im. gen. Kazimierza Sosnkowskiego	7,150
Resovia Rzeszów	Rzeszów	Stadion Miejski Stal^{2}	11,547
Stal Rzeszów	Rzeszów	Stadion Miejski Stal	11,547
Wisła Kraków	Kraków	Stadion im. Henryka Reymana	33,326
Wisła Płock	Płock	Orlen Stadion im. Kazimierza Górskiego	15,004^{3}
Zagłębie Sosnowiec	Sosnowiec	ArcelorMittal Park	11,600
Znicz Pruszków	Pruszków	Stadion MZOS	1,977

1. Due to Odra's home venue missing a heated pitch, they played their home games at GIEKSA Arena in Bełchatów from 15 November 2023 to 31 March 2024.
2. Due to the renovation of the Resovia Stadium in Rzeszów, Resovia play their home games at the Stadion Miejski Stal.
3. Wisła Płock played the first two home matches at limited capacity of 4,300 due to ongoing construction work. The stadium opened in its full capacity for a matchday 7 fixture against Polonia Warsaw.

== League table ==
Pos	Team	Pld	W	D	L	GF	GA	GD	Pts	Promotion or Relegation
1	Lechia Gdańsk (C, P)	34	21	5	8	60	34	+26	68	Promotion to Ekstraklasa
2	GKS Katowice (P)	34	18	8	8	68	35	+33	62 (Note: GKS Katowice finished ahead of Arka Gdynia on head-to-head points: Katowice 1–1 Arka Gdynia, Arka Gdynia 0–1 Katowice)	Promotion to Ekstraklasa
3	Arka Gdynia	34	18	8	8	52	34	+18	62	Qualification for promotion play-offs
4	Motor Lublin (O, P)	34	16	8	10	49	42	+7	56	Qualification for promotion play-offs
5	Górnik Łęczna	34	14	13	7	35	29	+6	55	Qualification for promotion play-offs
6	Odra Opole	34	15	8	11	42	32	+10	53	Qualification for promotion play-offs
7	Wisła Płock	34	14	9	11	46	46	0	51 (Note: Wisła Płock finished ahead of Miedź Legnica and GKS Tychy on head-to-head points: Wisła Płock 9, Miedź Legnica 5, GKS Tychy 2)	
8	Miedź Legnica	34	13	12	9	52	36	+16	51	
9	GKS Tychy	34	16	3	15	43	47	−4	51	
10	Wisła Kraków	34	13	11	10	62	50	+12	50	Qualification for Europa League first qualifying round (Note: Wisła Kraków qualified for the Europa League first qualifying round as the 2023–24 Polish Cup winners.)
11	Stal Rzeszów	34	14	6	14	53	60	−7	48	
12	Chrobry Głogów	34	11	9	14	35	49	−14	42 (Note: Chrobry Głogów finished ahead of Znicz Pruszków on head-to-head points: Chrobry Głogów 1–0 Znicz Pruszków, Znicz Pruszków 0–0 Chrobry Głogów)	
13	Znicz Pruszków	34	12	6	16	34	44	−10	42	
14	Bruk-Bet Termalica Nieciecza	34	10	11	13	56	52	+4	41	
15	Polonia Warsaw	34	8	11	15	41	50	−9	35	
16	Resovia Rzeszów (R)	34	9	7	18	39	60	−21	34	Relegation to II liga
17	Podbeskidzie Bielsko-Biała (R)	34	4	11	19	26	59	−33	23	Relegation to II liga
18	Zagłębie Sosnowiec (R)	34	2	10	22	21	55	−34	16	Relegation to II liga

Source: 1liga.org, 90minut.pl
Rules for classification: 1) Points; 2) Head-to-head points; 3) Head-to-head goal difference; 4) Goal difference; 6) Goals scored; 7) Number of wins; 8) Number of away wins.
(Note: Head-to-head record was used only after all the matches between the teams in question have been played)
(C) Champions; (O) Play-off winner; (P) Promoted; (R) Relegated

== Positions by round ==
Note: The place taken by the team that played fewer matches than the opponents was underlined. (Note: The list of postponed matches: Polonia Warsaw – Lechia Gdańsk (12th round, played on 31 October 2023); Resovia – Wisła Płock (17th round, played on 10 February 2024); Podbeskidzie Bielsko-Biała – Motor Lublin (17th round, played on 28 February 2024); Zagłębie Sosnowiec – Chrobry Głogów (17th round, played on 19 December 2023); Górnik Łęczna – GKS Tychy (17th round, played on 20 February 2024); GKS Katowice – Miedź Legnica (18th round, played on 27 February 2024))

Team ╲ Round	1	2	3	4	5	6	7	8	9	10	11	12	13	14	15	16	17	18	19	20	21	22	23	24	25	26	27	28	29	30	31	32	33	34
Lechia Gdańsk	2	7	8	6	8	7	8	9	8	8	8	9	9	3	3	5	3	2	4	3	3	2	1	1	1	2	1	1	1	1	1	1	1	1
GKS Katowice	15	8	9	5	4	2	5	6	9	10	11	10	12	12	11	12	12	13	11	11	11	10	7	6	3	3	3	3	4	4	3	3	3	2
Arka Gdynia	7	9	14	9	7	9	11	10	11	11	6	6	4	2	1	1	1	1	1	1	1	1	2	2	2	1	2	2	2	2	2	2	2	3
Motor Lublin	5	4	4	3	5	4	2	4	4	6	10	7	6	7	8	7	7	5	3	5	4	4	4	5	6	4	5	6	8	6	8	8	4	4
Górnik Łęczna	7	9	12	8	6	6	4	1	2	2	2	3	5	4	4	6	6	10	10	10	7	7	10	10	7	5	4	5	7	9	7	4	5	5
Odra Opole	1	1	5	4	2	3	1	2	1	1	1	1	1	1	2	2	2	3	6	6	6	8	9	9	10	9	9	8	6	8	9	9	8	6
Wisła Płock	11	9	10	15	13	14	10	7	5	4	9	11	10	10	7	9	10	9	7	7	8	9	6	7	8	8	8	9	9	7	4	5	6	7
Miedź Legnica	6	2	2	2	1	1	3	5	6	5	3	2	3	6	6	4	5	7	8	8	9	6	8	8	9	10	10	10	10	11	10	10	10	8
GKS Tychy	4	3	1	1	3	5	6	3	3	3	4	4	2	5	5	3	4	4	2	2	2	3	3	3	4	6	6	7	3	3	5	6	7	9
Wisła Kraków	7	6	6	10	14	8	9	11	10	9	5	5	7	8	9	8	8	6	5	4	5	5	5	4	5	7	7	4	5	5	6	7	9	10
Stal Rzeszów	18	16	16	17	17	16	17	17	17	14	13	12	13	13	13	10	11	11	12	13	13	13	14	14	14	11	11	11	11	10	11	11	11	11
Chrobry Głogów	16	16	18	18	18	18	18	18	18	18	18	18	18	16	14	14	15	15	15	14	15	14	13	13	11	12	12	12	13	14	14	13	13	12
Znicz Pruszków	3	5	3	7	9	11	12	12	12	13	15	16	15	18	15	15	13	12	13	12	12	12	11	11	12	13	13	13	12	12	12	12	12	13
Bruk-Bet Termalica Nieciecza	7	14	7	11	15	10	7	8	7	7	7	8	8	9	10	11	9	8	9	9	10	11	12	12	13	14	14	14	14	13	13	14	14	14
Polonia Warsaw	13	15	13	14	11	13	15	16	16	12	12	13	11	11	12	13	14	14	14	15	16	16	16	16	16	15	15	15	15	15	15	15	15	15
Resovia Rzeszów	17	18	17	12	10	12	14	15	15	17	14	14	16	14	16	16	16	16	16	16	14	15	15	15	15	16	16	16	16	16	16	16	16	16
Podbeskidzie Bielsko-Biała	11	9	10	13	12	15	13	14	13	16	17	17	14	15	17	17	17	17	17	17	17	17	17	17	17	17	17	17	17	17	17	17	17	17
Zagłębie Sosnowiec	13	13	15	16	16	17	16	13	14	15	16	15	17	17	18	18	18	18	18	18	18	18	18	18	18	18	18	18	18	18	18	18	18	18

Promotion to Ekstraklasa
Qualification for promotion play-offs
Relegation to II liga

Source: 90minut.pl

== Results ==
Home \ Away	ARK	BBT	CHG	KAT	TYC	GKŁ	LGD	MLE	MOT	ODO	POD	PWA	RES	STR	WKR	WPŁ	ZSO	ZNI
Arka Gdynia	—	2–2	2–1	0–1	2–0	0–0	1–0	2–1	2–0	2–2	1–0	2–3	3–2	5–1	1–1	2–0	1–0	2–0
Bruk-Bet Termalica Nieciecza	2–1	—	1–1	2–2	6–1	3–0	0–0	1–4	0–2	0–1	2–2	2–2	1–4	1–2	2–1	2–2	1–1	1–0
Chrobry Głogów	1–0	0–5	—	1–4	2–1	0–1	2–4	0–0	0–1	0–0	3–0	0–3	1–1	2–1	3–2	0–2	2–0	1–0
GKS Katowice	1–1	0–0	3–1	—	1–0	0–0	1–0	2–0	2–0	1–3	5–0	0–2	3–0	8–0	5–2	4–1	0–1	3–1
GKS Tychy	0–1	3–2	1–2	2–3	—	0–1	1–3	0–0	2–0	2–0	3–0	1–0	1–3	2–0	1–0	0–1	2–0	2–1
Górnik Łęczna	0–0	0–1	3–1	1–1	2–0	—	0–1	0–0	1–1	1–0	2–0	0–0	3–1	1–3	2–2	1–0	1–1	1–1
Lechia Gdańsk	2–1	3–1	1–0	5–1	3–0	1–1	—	2–0	0–1	2–1	3–0	1–0	4–0	2–1	0–0	3–1	4–0	1–0
Miedź Legnica	0–1	2–2	1–1	1–0	2–2	0–0	4–1	—	2–0	1–2	6–1	2–1	1–2	2–1	1–1	4–0	2–0	1–2
Motor Lublin	2–2	1–0	1–1	1–1	1–1	0–1	1–0	1–3	—	2–0	2–1	1–1	3–2	3–2	1–4	2–2	3–2	3–3
Odra Opole	1–0	2–1	3–0	1–0	0–2	0–3	0–0	0–0	0–2	—	1–0	3–0	3–0	1–1	1–2	3–0	0–0	2–0
Podbeskidzie Bielsko-Biała	0–0	2–1	0–1	1–1	0–2	1–1	1–2	0–0	1–2	1–2	—	1–2	2–2	0–1	2–1	1–1	2–1	1–1
Polonia Warsaw	0–3	1–1	1–1	1–2	2–3	0–2	0–1	3–4	0–1	1–1	2–0	—	1–0	2–2	2–3	2–2	3–3	0–1
Resovia Rzeszów	1–2	0–4	0–1	0–2	2–0	2–3	2–0	1–1	1–3	1–0	1–1	1–1	—	0–2	1–1	2–2	1–0	1–2
Stal Rzeszów	2–3	4–2	2–1	2–2	1–2	3–0	4–2	1–3	2–1	2–5	2–2	1–2	2–1	—	1–2	0–1	0–0	2–0
Wisła Kraków	5–1	0–3	1–1	3–2	0–1	4–0	3–4	2–0	1–3	1–3	3–1	2–1	4–1	0–0	—	0–0	0–0	6–2
Wisła Płock	0–3	3–1	2–1	2–1	4–1	2–1	1–1	2–1	1–0	2–0	2–1	3–0	1–2	1–2	1–1	—	2–0	0–1
Zagłębie Sosnowiec	1–3	1–3	1–2	0–4	0–1	0–1	5–2	1–2	0–4	1–1	0–0	0–2	0–1	0–1	1–1	1–1	—	0–1
Znicz Pruszków	2–0	2–0	1–1	0–2	2–3	0–1	0–2	1–1	1–0	1–0	0–1	0–0	2–0	1–2	2–3	2–1	1–0	—

Source: 1liga.org, 90minut.pl
Legend: Blue = home team win; Yellow = draw; Red = away team win.
For upcoming matches, an "a" indicates there is an article about the rivalry between the two participants.

== Results by round ==
Team ╲ Round	1	2	3	4	5	6	7	8	9	10	11	12	13	14	15	16	17	18	19	20	21	22	23	24	25	26	27	28	29	30	31	32	33	34
Arka Gdynia	D	D	L	W	W	L	L	W	L	W	W	W	W	W	W	W	D	L	D	W	W	W	D	D	W	W	D	W	L	W	D	W	L	L
Bruk-Bet Termalica Nieciecza	D	L	W	L	L	W	W	D	W	D	D	L	W	D	L	L	W	W	D	D	L	D	L	L	L	D	L	D	L	W	D	L	W	W
Chrobry Głogów	L	L	L	L	L	L	W	D	W	D	D	L	L	W	W	W	L	L	W	D	L	D	W	W	W	L	D	L	D	L	D	D	W	W
GKS Katowice	L	W	D	W	W	W	D	L	L	L	D	D	L	D	W	L	D	W	W	L	W	W	W	W	W	W	L	D	D	W	W	W	W	W
GKS Tychy	W	W	W	W	L	D	L	W	L	W	L	W	W	L	L	W	W	W	W	L	W	L	D	L	D	L	W	L	W	W	L	L	L	L
Górnik Łęczna	D	D	D	W	W	W	W	W	D	D	D	D	L	W	D	L	L	D	D	W	W	D	L	D	W	W	W	L	D	L	W	W	L	W
Lechia Gdańsk	W	L	D	W	L	W	L	D	W	D	D	W	W	W	D	L	W	W	L	W	W	W	W	W	W	L	W	W	W	L	W	W	W	L
Miedź Legnica	W	W	D	W	W	D	D	L	L	D	W	W	D	L	D	W	L	D	D	W	L	W	D	L	L	D	D	W	L	L	D	W	W	W
Motor Lublin	W	W	D	W	L	W	W	L	L	L	L	W	W	D	L	W	W	W	L	W	W	D	D	L	D	W	D	L	D	W	L	D	W	W
Odra Opole	W	W	L	W	W	D	W	D	W	W	D	W	L	L	L	W	L	D	L	L	W	L	D	D	L	D	W	W	W	L	L	W	D	W
Podbeskidzie Bielsko-Biała	D	D	D	L	W	L	D	D	D	L	L	L	W	L	D	L	L	W	D	L	L	D	L	L	W	L	L	D	L	L	D	L	L	L
Polonia Warsaw	L	L	W	L	W	L	L	L	D	W	W	W	L	D	D	L	D	L	L	L	L	D	D	D	D	W	W	D	L	L	D	L	D	W
Resovia Rzeszów	L	L	D	W	W	L	L	L	D	L	W	L	L	W	L	L	L	W	D	D	W	L	L	W	L	L	L	W	D	L	D	D	L	W
Stal Rzeszów	L	L	D	L	L	W	L	L	W	W	W	D	L	D	W	W	D	D	L	L	L	L	L	W	W	W	W	D	W	W	L	W	W	L
Wisła Kraków	D	W	D	L	L	W	D	D	W	D	W	W	L	D	D	W	L	W	W	W	L	W	D	W	L	L	D	W	D	W	D	L	L	L
Wisła Płock	D	D	D	L	W	L	W	W	W	D	L	L	W	D	W	L	W	W	D	L	W	D	W	D	L	W	D	L	W	W	W	L	L	L
Zagłębie Sosnowiec	L	D	L	L	L	D	W	W	L	D	L	D	L	D	L	L	L	L	L	L	L	D	D	L	L	D	L	D	L	L	D	L	L	L
Znicz Pruszków	W	D	W	L	L	L	L	W	L	L	L	L	D	L	W	W	W	W	L	W	L	L	W	D	D	L	L	L	W	W	D	D	W	L

Source: 1liga.org, 90minut.pl
W = Win; D = Draw; L = Loss

== Promotion play-offs ==
I liga play-offs final for the 2023–24 season will be played on 2 June 2024. The teams who finished in 3rd, 4th, 5th and 6th place are set to compete. The fixtures are determined by final league position – 3rd team of regular season vs 6th team of regular season and 4th team of regular season vs 5th team of regular season. The winner of final match will be promoted to the Ekstraklasa for next season. All matches will be played in a stadiums of team which occupied higher position in regular season.

Semi-finals; 30 May 2024
3	Arka Gdynia	4
6	Odra Opole	2
4	Motor Lublin	0 (4)
5	Górnik Łęczna	0 (2)

Final; 2 June 2024
3	Arka Gdynia	1
4	Motor Lublin	2

=== Matches ===
==== Semi-finals ====
30 May 2024
17:30 CEST

Motor Lublin	0–0	Górnik Łęczna
	Łączy nas piłka 90minut
Penalties
Wolski (penalty scored); Mráz (penalty scored); Gąsior (penalty scored); Rudol (penalty scored)	4–2	(penalty scored) Cissé; (penalty missed) Deja; (penalty scored) Gąska; (penalty missed) Dziwniel

Arena Lublin, Lublin
Attendance: 15,110
Referee: Jarosław Przybył (Kluczbork)
30 May 2024
20:40 CEST

Arka Gdynia	4–2	Odra Opole
Borecki 42'; Czubak 44'; Szrek 60' (o.g.); Kobacki 83'	Łączy nas piłka 90minut	Piroch 34', 90+4'

Stadion Miejski, Gdynia
Attendance: 7,996
Referee: Piotr Lasyk (Bytom)

==== Final ====
2 June 2024
18:00 CEST

Arka Gdynia	1–2	Motor Lublin
Kobacki 13'	Łączy nas piłka 90minut	Wolski 87'; N'Diaye 90+3'

Stadion Miejski, Gdynia
Attendance: 12,741
Referee: Szymon Marciniak (Płock)

== Season statistics ==
=== Top goalscorers ===
Rank	Player	Club	Goals
1	(Spain) Ángel Rodado	Wisła Kraków	21
2	(Poland) Karol Czubak	Arka Gdynia	15
2	(Poland) Łukasz Sekulski	Wisła Płock	15
4	(Poland) Sebastian Bergier	GKS Katowice	13
4	(Poland) Olaf Kobacki	Arka Gdynia	13
6	(Poland) Piotr Ceglarz	Motor Lublin	12
6	(Poland) Arkadiusz Jędrych	GKS Katowice	12
8	(Poland) Mikołaj Lebedyński	Chrobry Głogów	11
8	(Spain) Joan Román	Wisła Kraków	11
10	(Poland) Wiktor Biedrzycki	Bruk-Bet Termalica Nieciecza	10
10	(Japan) Shuma Nagamatsu	Znicz Pruszków	10

== Attendances ==
Pos	Team	Total	High	Low	Average	Change
1	Wisła Kraków	282,422	31,916	5,417	16,613	+32.6%
2	Lechia Gdańsk	149,546	36,483	1,171	8,707	+17.1%^{1}
3	Motor Lublin	129,632	13,994	3,932	7,625	+144.3%^{2}
4	Arka Gdynia	86,852	12,821	523	5,109	+6.3%
5	Zagłębie Sosnowiec	86,207	8,947	1,436	5,071	+30.3%
6	Wisła Płock	83,603	13,504	2,349	4,918	+25.4%^{1}
7	GKS Tychy	82,779	9,691	2,296	4,869	+41.7%
8	GKS Katowice	65,777	7,455	2,142	3,869	+117.8%
9	Miedź Legnica	61,937	4,764	2,889	3,643	−17.6%^{1}
10	Stal Rzeszów	59,124	6,281	2,452	3,478	−12.9%
11	Podbeskidzie Bielsko-Biała	58,043	8,573	2,011	3,414	−14.9%
12	Odra Opole	39,332	3,482	200	2,314	+36.4%
13	Polonia Warsaw	38,575	4,151	1,452	2,269	+10.1%^{2}
14	Górnik Łęczna	35,523	6,984	1,314	2,090	+54.2%
15	Bruk-Bet Termalica Nieciecza	30,416	2,571	1,146	1,779	−20.5%
16	Resovia Rzeszów	29,700	6,533	496	1,747	−8.5%
17	Chrobry Głogów	20,042	2,489	457	1,179	+7.4%
18	Znicz Pruszków	16,921	1,801	249	995	+197.9%^{2}
	League total	1,354,168	36,483	200	4,425	+25.5%

Source: 1liga.org
Notes:
1. Team played last season in Ekstraklasa.
2. Team played last season in II liga.

== Awards ==
=== Monthly awards ===
==== Player of the Month ====
Month	Player	Club
July & August 2023	(Spain) Borja Galán	Odra Opole
September 2023	(Poland) Maciej Gostomski	Górnik Łęczna
October 2023	(Poland) Olaf Kobacki	Arka Gdynia
November 2023	(Switzerland) Adler Da Silva	Stal Rzeszów
December 2023	(Poland) Szymon Sobczak	Wisła Kraków
February & March 2024	(Ukraine) Maksym Khlan	Lechia Gdańsk
April 2024	(Poland) Kacper Skóra	Arka Gdynia
May 2024	(Poland) Adrian Błąd	GKS Katowice

==== Coach of the Month ====
Month	Coach	Club
July & August 2023	(Poland) Radosław Bella	Miedź Legnica
September 2023	(Poland) Adam Nocoń	Odra Opole
October 2023	(Poland) Wojciech Łobodziński	Arka Gdynia
November 2023	(Poland) Wojciech Łobodziński	Arka Gdynia
December 2023	(Portugal) Gonçalo Feio	Motor Lublin
February & March 2024	(Poland) Rafał Górak	GKS Katowice
April 2024	(Poland) Marek Zub	Stal Rzeszów
May 2024	(Poland) Rafał Górak	GKS Katowice

== Number of teams by region ==
Number	Region	Team(s)
4	Silesian Voivodeship	GKS Katowice, GKS Tychy, Podbeskidzie Bielsko-Biała and Zagłębie Sosnowiec
3	Masovian Voivodeship	Polonia Warsaw, Wisła Płock and Znicz Pruszków
2	Lesser Poland Voivodeship	Bruk-Bet Termalica Nieciecza and Wisła Kraków
2	Lower Silesian Voivodeship	Chrobry Głogów and Miedź Legnica
2	Podkarpackie Voivodeship	Resovia Rzeszów and Stal Rzeszów
2	Pomeranian Voivodeship	Arka Gdynia and Lechia Gdańsk
2	Lublin Voivodeship	Górnik Łęczna and Motor Lublin
1	Opole Voivodeship	Odra Opole
0	Greater Poland Voivodeship	
0	Kuyavian-Pomeranian Voivodeship	
0	Lubusz Voivodeship	
0	Łódź Voivodeship	
0	Podlaskie Voivodeship	
0	Świętokrzyskie Voivodeship	
0	Warmian-Masurian Voivodeship	
0	West Pomeranian Voivodeship	

== See also ==
- 2023–24 Ekstraklasa
- 2023–24 II liga
- 2023–24 III liga
- 2023–24 Polish Cup
- 2023 Polish Super Cup
