= 2024–25 Kotwica Kołobrzeg season =

MKP Kotwica Kołobrzeg
2024–25 season
- Chairman: Adam Dzik
- Manager: Ryszard Tarasiewicz (until 10 January); Piotr Tworek (from 13 January)
- Stadium: Sebastian Karpiniuk Stadium
- I liga: 16th
- Polish Cup: Round of 32
Home colours	Away colours

The 2024–25 season was the last, 79th season in the history of Kotwica Kołobrzeg, and the club's first ever in the I liga. In addition to the domestic league, the team participated in the Polish Cup. Manager Ryszard Tarasiewicz departed on 10 January 2025 and Piotr Tworek was appointed on 13 January 2025.

Kotwica Kołobrzeg finished 16th out of 18, resulting in relegation back to II liga at the end of the campaign. Kotwica's application for a license to compete in II liga for the 2025–26 season was denied by the PZPN Licensing Committee on grounds of failure to meet financial criteria (e.g. F.01, F.03–F.05), and the club did not appeal the decision within the five‑day window.

On 23 June 2025, a day after releasing all players and coaching staff via e‑mail, the club formally filed for insolvency and entered liquidation, ceasing all first-team operations. In the aftermath, local supporters and activists founded a phoenix club under the name Morski Klub Sportowy "Kotwica" Kołobrzeg, which retained the original crest and colours, and was admitted to the Klasa okręgowa (sixth tier) for the 2025–26 season.

== Friendlies ==
=== Pre-season ===
22 June 2024 Friendly	Chojniczanka Chojnice (Poland)	0–0	(Poland) Kotwica Kołobrzeg	Szczecinek
12:00				Stadium: Stadion Miejski
Note: The match was suspended after 15 minutes due to bad weather.

30 June 2024 Friendly	Kotwica Kołobrzeg (Poland)	1–3	(Poland) Piast Gliwice	Opalenica
11:00	Stasiak 83' (pen.)		Kądzior 43', 55'; Liszewski 90+1'

3 July 2024 Friendly	Chrobry Głogów (Poland)	1–1	(Poland) Kotwica Kołobrzeg	Bucz
11:00	Ozimek 90'		Ziętek 82'	Stadium: Helios Bucz Stadium

== Competitions ==
=== Overall record ===
Competition	First match	Last match	Starting round	Record							
Competition	First match	Last match	Starting round	Pld	W	D	L	GF	GA	GD	Win %
I liga	21 July 2024	25–26 May 2025	Matchday 1	24	4	9	11	18	37	−19	16.67
Polish Cup	7 August 2024	29 October 2024	Preliminary round	3	2	0	1	5	4	+1	66.67
Total				27	6	9	12	23	41	−18	22.22

Last updated: 28 March 2025
Source: Soccerway

=== I liga ===
==== League table ====
Pos	Team	Pld	W	D	L	GF	GA	GD	Pts	Promotion or Relegation
14	Odra Opole	34	7	9	18	31	61	−30	30 (Note: Ranked based on head-to-head points: Odra Opole 6 pts, Pogoń Siedlce 0 pts.)	
15	Pogoń Siedlce	34	7	9	18	38	53	−15	30	
16	Kotwica Kołobrzeg (Note: MKP Kotwica were denied a license to compete in the 2025–26 II liga. Then they ceased its activities and was not registered at any league level in the following season. At the same time, MKS Kotwica appeared in the regional league, but it is a different legal entity, even though supporters refer to it as the continuation of the club’s traditions.) (R)	34	6	11	17	29	55	−26	29	Relegation, then dissolution
17	Warta Poznań (R)	34	6	6	22	22	56	−34	24	Relegation to II liga
18	Stal Stalowa Wola (R)	34	4	11	19	27	65	−38	23	Relegation to II liga

Source: 1liga.org, 90minut.pl
Rules for classification: 1) Points; 2) Head-to-head points; 3) Head-to-head goal difference; 4) Goal difference; 6) Goals scored; 7) Number of wins; 8) Number of away wins.
(Note: Head-to-head record is used only after all the matches between the teams in question have been played)
(R) Relegated
Notes:

Semi-finals; 29 May 2025
3	Wisła Płock	2
6	Polonia Warsaw	1
4	Wisła Kraków	0
5	Miedź Legnica	1

Final; 1 June 2025
3	Wisła Płock	2
5	Miedź Legnica	0

==== Results summary ====
Overall								Home						Away					
Pld	W	D	L	GF	GA	GD	Pts	W	D	L	GF	GA	GD	W	D	L	GF	GA	GD
24	4	9	11	18	37	−19	21	2	6	4	7	13	−6	2	3	7	11	24	−13

Last updated: 28 March 2025.

==== Results by round ====
Round	1	2	3	4	5
Ground	A	H	A	H	A
Result	D	D	W	L	W
Position	9	12	7		

Updated to match(es) played on 16 August 2024. Source:
A = Away; H = Home; W = Win; D = Draw; L = Loss

==== Matches ====
The match schedule was released on 12 June 2024.

21 July 2024 1	Wisła Płock	1–1	Kotwica Kołobrzeg	Płock
12:00	Famulak 48'		Cywiński 13'	Stadium: Kazimierz Górski Stadium; Referee: Leszek Lewandowski

26 July 2024 2	Kotwica Kołobrzeg	0–0	GKS Tychy	Kołobrzeg
20:00				Stadium: Sebastian Karpiniuk Stadium; Referee: Sylwester Rasmus

3 August 2024 3	Stal Stalowa Wola	0–2	Kotwica Kołobrzeg	Stalowa Wola
14:30 UTC+2			Jonathan 38'; Bykowski 90+3'	Stadium: Subcarpathian Football Center; Referee: Mateusz Jenda

11 August 2024 4	Kotwica Kołobrzeg	1–3	Stal Rzeszów	Kołobrzeg
17:00				Stadium: Sebastian Karpiniuk Stadium; Referee: Piotr Urban

16 August 2024 5	ŁKS Łódź	0–2	Kotwica Kołobrzeg	Łódź
20:30	Majcenić (red card) 88'		Bykowski 14'; Petrović 90+7'	Stadium: Władysław Król Stadium; Attendance: 6,254; Referee: Łukasz Karski

=== Polish Cup ===
7 August 2024 Preliminary round	Kotwica Kołobrzeg	2–1	Skra Częstochowa	Kołobrzeg
18:00 UTC+2	Petrović 55'; Kreković 83'	Report	Stangret 40'	Stadium: Sebastian Karpiniuk Stadium; Referee: Filip Kaliszewski (Gdańsk)

24 September 2024 First round	ŁKS Łódź II	2–3	Kotwica Kołobrzeg	Łódź
17:00 UTC+2	Wzięch 66'; Popławski 90'	Report	Rajsel 47'; Jonathan 48', 72' (pen.)	Stadium: Stadion Miejski im. Władysława Króla; Referee: Damian Gawęcki (Kielce)

29 October 2024 Round of 32	Kotwica Kołobrzeg	0–1	Puszcza Niepołomice	Kołobrzeg
17:00 UTC+1		Report	Siemaszko 53'	Stadium: Sebastian Karpiniuk Stadium; Attendance: 300; Referee: Sylwester Rasmus (Toruń)
