= Volsky =

Volsky (masculine), Volskaya (feminine), or Volskoye (neuter) may refer to:

People

- Arkady Volsky (1932–2006), Russian politician
- Lavon Volski (b. 1965), Belarusian musician and poet
- Paula Volsky, American fantasy writer
- Tamara Volskaya, Russian musician
- Vasily Volsky (1897–1946), Soviet general
- Vladimir Volsky (1877–1937), Russian revolutionary

Places

- Volsky District, a district of Saratov Oblast, Russia
- Volskaya (rural locality), a rural locality (a village) in Arkhangelsk Oblast, Russia
- Volskoye, a rural locality (a village) in Tver Oblast, Russia

== See also ==
- Volsk, a town in Saratov Oblast, Russia
- Volesky, a surname
- Wolski, Polish last name
