= Shuma Nagamatsu =

Japanese footballer (born 1995)

Personal information
- Date of birth: 29 August 1995 (age 31)
- Place of birth: Moriguchi, Japan
- Height: 1.71 m (5 ft 7 in)
- Position: Midfielder

Team information
- Current team: Ruch Chorzów
- Number: 18

College career
Years	Team	Apps	(Gls)
2014–2017	Kansai University		

Senior career*
Years	Team	Apps	(Gls)
2018	Super Nova	14	(12)
2019	Tukums	23	(20)
2020–2021	Świt Szczecin	33	(11)
2021–2024	Znicz Pruszków	89	(20)
2024–2025	Korona Kielce	17	(1)
2025	Korona Kielce II	1	(2)
2025–	Ruch Chorzów	33	(4)
- * Club domestic league appearances and goals as of 14:50, 29 May 2026 (UTC)

Shuma Nagamatsu (Japanese: 永松秀麻; born 29 August 1995) is a Japanese professional footballer who plays as a midfielder for Polish club Ruch Chorzów.

== Early life ==
Nagamatsu was born in 1995 in Moriguchi, Japan. He played golf as a child.

== Career ==
In 2021, Nagamatsu signed for Polish side Znicz Pruszków. He was regarded as one of the club's most important players.

On 22 June 2024, he joined Ekstraklasa club Korona Kielce on a free transfer. He signed a one-year contract with an option for a further year.

On 17 June 2025, Nagamatsu moved back down to the Polish second tier, signing a one-year deal with Ruch Chorzów. He became the first Japanese player in the Silesian club's history.

== Style of play ==
Nagamatsu mainly operates as a midfielder. He is left-footed.

== Honours ==
Świt Szczecin

- Polish Cup (West Pomerania regionals): 2019–20

Individual

- Polish Union of Footballers' I liga Discovery of the Season: 2023–24
