= Jonathan (footballer, born 1999) =

Brazilian footballer

Personal information
- Full name: Jonathan Luiz Moreira Rosa Júnior
- Date of birth: 28 April 1999 (age 27)
- Place of birth: Capão da Canoa, Brazil
- Height: 1.79 m (5 ft 10 in)
- Position: Forward

Team information
- Current team: V-Varen Nagasaki
- Number: 99

Youth career
- 2007–2009: Juventude
- 2009–2018: Internacional
- 2018–2019: Avaí

Senior career*
Years	Team	Apps	(Gls)
2019–2021	Avaí	82	(16)
2022–2023	Athletico Paranaense	4	(0)
2022	→ Chapecoense (loan)	20	(0)
2023	→ Athletic-MG (loan)	6	(4)
2023	→ Pouso Alegre (loan)	10	(1)
2023–2025	Kotwica Kołobrzeg	44	(26)
2025	Radomiak Radom	0	(0)
2025	Stal Stalowa Wola	10	(0)
2025–2026	Stal Rzeszów	37	(13)
2026–	V-Varen Nagasaki	0	(0)
- * Club domestic league appearances and goals as of 17:53, 28 August 2026 (UTC)

Jonathan Luiz Moreira Rosa Júnior (born 28 April 1999), simply known as Jonathan or Jonathan Júnior, is a Brazilian professional footballer who plays as a forward for J1 League club V-Varen Nagasaki.

== Club career ==
Born in Capão da Canoa, Rio Grande do Sul, Jonathan joined Internacional's youth setup in 2009, aged ten, after two years at Juventude. In September 2018, he moved to Avaí and was assigned to their under-20 squad. After being the latter club's top goalscorer in the 2019 Copa São Paulo de Futebol Júnior and the 2019 Campeonato Brasileiro de Aspirantes, he was promoted to the main squad by manager Alberto Valentim.

Jonathan made his first team – and Série A – debut on 2 September 2019, coming on as a second-half substitute for Brenner in a 1–0 away win against Fluminense. He scored his first goal thirteen days later, netting the game's only in an away defeat of Athletico Paranaense.

On 9 August 2023, Jonathan made his first career move abroad to join Polish third tier club Kotwica Kołobrzeg on a two-year deal. During the 2023–24 season, he scored 23 goals in 30 II liga appearances, including two hat-tricks. He was the league's best goalscorer across the regular season, as Kotwica finished 2nd in the standings and were promoted to the I liga for the first time in the club's history. In November 2024, he filed for his contract to be unilaterally terminated, citing unpaid wages. Kotwica denied Jonathan's claims in an official statement a few days later, before counter-suing him for 300,000 PLN in early December. On 13 January 2025, he left the club by mutual consent.

On 17 January 2025, Jonathan signed with Ekstraklasa club Radomiak Radom on a six-month contract with a one-year extension option. On 23 February 2025, he left the club by mutual consent without making an appearance.

Hours later, he returned to the I liga and joined Stal Stalowa Wola. He made his debut the following day as a substitute in a goalless draw against Warta Poznań.

On 11 June 2025, Jonathan moved to another I liga side Stal Rzeszów on a one-year contract, with a one-year extension option. Jonathan made his Stal Rzeszów debut in a club friendly with Korona Kielce that ended in a 4–4 draw on 09 July 2025, scoring two goals. Jonathan played in his second Stal match four days later, another club friendly, where he scored the only goal of the match against Ukrainian side Rukh Lviv. Jonathan scored his first I liga goal for Stal on 25 July 2025 against Śląsk Wrocław, with Stal winning the game 2–1. In April 2026, Stal activated Jonathan's one-year extension clause, extending his contract to June 2027.

On 15 September 2026, Jonathan moved to J1 League club V-Varen Nagasaki for a reported fee of €250,000.

== Honours ==
Avaí

- Campeonato Catarinense: 2019, 2021

Individual

- II liga top scorer: 2023–24
- Polish Union of Footballers' II liga Team of the Season: 2023–24
- Polish Union of Footballers' II liga Discovery of the Season: 2023–24
