= Patryk Wolski =

Polish footballer

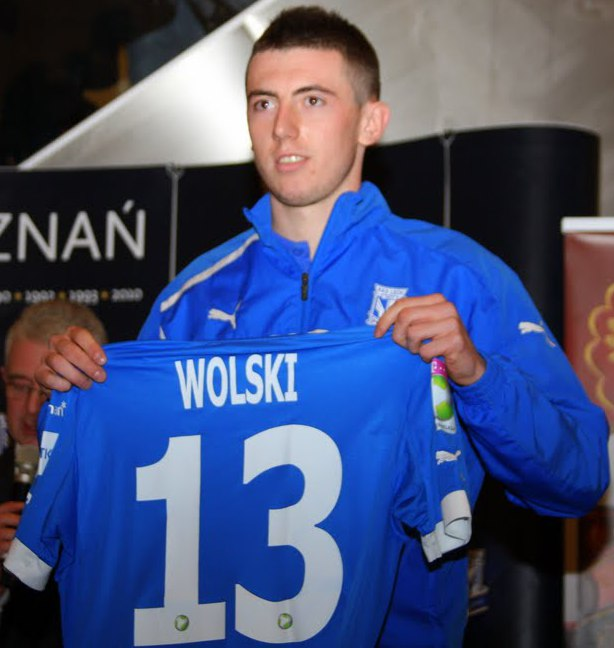

Personal information
- Date of birth: 12 April 1993 (age 33)
- Place of birth: Radom, Poland
- Height: 1.86 m (6 ft 1 in)
- Position: Forward

Team information
- Current team: GKS Stromiec (manager)

Youth career
- Junior Radom
- PKS Makowiec
- 2007–2009: Młodzik Radom
- 2009–2012: Lech Poznań

Senior career*
Years	Team	Apps	(Gls)
2012–2015	Lech Poznań	6	(1)
2013–2014	Lech Poznań II	17	(1)
2013–2014	→ Radomiak Radom (loan)	23	(2)
2015	Radomiak Radom	12	(2)
2015–2016	Centrum Radom		

Managerial career
- 2015–2016: Centrum Radom (player-manager)
- 2021–2023: Radomiak Radom II
- 2023–: GKS Stromiec
- * Club domestic league appearances and goals

Patryk Wolski (born 12 April 1993) is a Polish football manager and former player who played as a forward, currently in charge of GKS Stromiec. At the age of 22, he became the manager of amateur club Centrum Radom.

== Honours ==
Radomiak Radom

- III liga Łódź–Masovian: 2014–15
