= Radunia Stężyca =

Polish football club

- Full name: Klub Sportowy Radunia Stężyca
- Founded: 1982; 44 years ago
- Ground: Arena Radunia
- Capacity: 450
- Chairman: Dawid Klawikowski
- Manager: Mateusz Bucholc
- League: IV liga Pomerania
- 2025–26: Regional league Gdańsk II, 1st of 16 (promoted)
- Website: raduniastezyca.pl
Home colours	Away colours

Radunia Stężyca is a Polish football club based in Stężyca, Pomeranian Voivodeship. As of the 2026–27 season, they compete in the IV liga Pomerania, the fifth tier.

== History ==
The club was founded in 1982.

In the 2020–21 season, Radunia was promoted to the II liga for the first time in its history. The team plays its home matches at the multipurpose stadium "Arena Radunia", which was put into use in 2017, with a capacity of 450 seats. The club also runs four youth groups. In the club's first season in II liga, Radunia finished 6th and qualified for the promotion playoffs.

Radunia's climb in the late 2010s and early 2020s, as well as its ability to regularly bring in players with top-flight and second division experience, was owed to support from the Stężyca county and its mayor Tomasz Brzoskowski. Players were employed and paid by the county, rather than the club itself. Heavy spending related to Radunia was cited as one of the main reasons for the county's dire financial situation at the start of 2024, with over 100 million PLN of debt to Stężyca's name. Following the 2024 Polish local elections, the new mayor, and former employee of Radunia, Ireneusz Stencel withdrew all of the funding from the club, resulting in departures of most of the players and staff. After finishing the 2023–24 season in seventh place, Radunia withdrew from the II liga on 27 June 2024.

They were eventually demoted to the IV liga Pomerania, the fifth level of competition, replacing their reserve side. After finishing the 2024–25 season in last place with a dismal record of 3 wins, 7 draws, and 24 losses, Radunia Stężyca was relegated to the Gdańsk II group of the regional league, the sixth tier, marking a dramatic fall from the II liga to the lowest levels of competition.
