= 2023–24 II liga =

II liga
- Season: 2023–24
- Dates: 21 July 2023 – 25 May 2024
- Champions: Pogoń Siedlce
- Promoted: Pogoń Siedlce; Kotwica Kołobrzeg; Stal Stalowa Wola
- Relegated: Stomil Olsztyn; Sandecja Nowy Sącz; Lech Poznań II; Radunia Stężyca (Note: Radunia withdrew from the competition at the end of the season.)
- Matches: 306
- Goals: 805 (2.63 per match)
- Top goalscorer: Jonathan Júnior (23 goals)
- Biggest home win: Radunia 5–1 Olimpia G. (9 September 2023); Chojniczanka 5–1 Radunia (22 September 2023); Zagłębie II 4–0 Stal (12 November 2023); Kalisz 5–1 Pogoń (24 February 2024); Wisła 4–0 Olimpia E. (28 March 2024)
- Biggest away win: Lech II 1–5 Kotwica (5 August 2023); Lech II 0–4 Pogoń (17 September 2023)
- Highest scoring: Hutnik 3–5 Kotwica (5 November 2023)
- Longest winning run: 4 matches Chojniczanka Chojnice; ŁKS Łódź II; Pogoń Siedlce; Polonia Bytom; Stal Stalowa Wola
- Longest unbeaten run: 12 matches Polonia Bytom
- Longest winless run: 13 matches Wisła Puławy
- Longest losing run: 5 matches Olimpia Grudziądz; Zagłębie Lubin II
- Highest attendance: 4,205; Stomil 1–1 Olimpia E. (8 October 2023)
- Lowest attendance: 0 (Note: Matches have been played behind closed doors without any spectators.); 17 matches
- Total attendance: 239,291
- Average attendance: 828 (Note: Average attendance without matches played behind closed doors without any spectators.) ▼13.8% 782 (Note: Average attendance from all games played.) ▼15.8%

The 2023–24 II liga (also known as eWinner II liga due to sponsorship reasons) was the 76th season of the third tier domestic division in the Polish football league system since its establishment in 1948 and the 16th season of the Polish II liga under its current title. The league was operated by the Polish Football Association.

The league was contested by 18 teams. The regular season was played in a round-robin tournament. The season started on 21 July 2023 and concluded on 25 May 2024.

== Teams ==
A total of 18 teams participate in the 2023–24 II liga season.

=== Changes from last season ===
The following teams have changed division since the 2022–23 season.

==== To II liga ====
| Relegated from 2022–23 I liga | Promoted from 2022–23 III liga |
|---|---|
| ▼ Skra Częstochowa ▼ Sandecja Nowy Sącz ▼ Chojniczanka Chojnice | ▲ ŁKS Łódź II (Group I) ▲ Olimpia Grudziądz (Group II) ▲ Polonia Bytom (Group III) ▲ Stal Stalowa Wola (Group IV) |

==== From II liga ====
| Promoted to 2023–24 I liga | Relegated to 2023–24 III liga |
|---|---|
| ▲ Polonia Warsaw ▲ Znicz Pruszków ▲ Motor Lublin | ▼ Siarka Tarnobrzeg ▼ Garbarnia Kraków ▼ Śląsk Wrocław II ▼ Górnik Polkowice |

=== Stadiums and locations ===
Location of teams in 2023–24 II liga.

Note: Table lists in alphabetical order.

| Team | Location | Venue | Capacity |
|---|---|---|---|
| Chojniczanka Chojnice | Chojnice | Stadion Miejski | 3,500 |
| GKS Jastrzębie | Jastrzębie-Zdrój | Stadion Miejski | 5,650 |
| Hutnik Kraków | Kraków | Stadion Miejski „Suche Stawy” | 6,000 |
| KKS 1925 Kalisz | Kalisz | Stadion Miejski | 8,166 |
| Kotwica Kołobrzeg | Kołobrzeg | Stadion im. Sebastiana Karpiniuka | 3,014 |
| Lech Poznań II | Poznań | Stadion Amiki Wronki | 5,296 |
| ŁKS Łódź II | Łódź | Stadion im. Władysława Króla | 18,029 |
| Olimpia Elbląg | Elbląg | Stadion Miejski | 3,000 |
| Olimpia Grudziądz | Grudziądz | Stadion im. Bronisława Malinowskiego | 5,323 |
| Pogoń Siedlce | Siedlce | Stadion Miejski | 2,901 |
| Polonia Bytom | Bytom | Stadion Odry ^{1} | 4,560 |
| Radunia Stężyca | Stężyca | Arena Radunia | 950 |
| Sandecja Nowy Sącz | Nowy Sącz | Stadion Garbarnii^{2} Stadion im. Ojca Władysława Augustynka | 963; 8,111 |
| Skra Częstochowa | Częstochowa | Stadion STO | 2,300 |
| Stal Stalowa Wola | Stalowa Wola | Podkarpackie Centrum Piłki Nożnej | 3,764 |
| Stomil Olsztyn | Olsztyn | Stadion Miejski | 4,200 |
| Wisła Puławy | Puławy | Stadion Miejski | 4,418 |
| Zagłębie Lubin II | Lubin | Stadion Miejski | 16,032 |

1. Due to building of a new stadium, Stadion Polonii Bytom, which will meet II liga regulations, Polonia Bytom was supposed to play their first home matches in Stadion Odry in Opole. However, they have not played a single match there as all their first six matches were played away. Polonia returned to new ground in round seven against Pogoń Siedlce.
2. Due to rebuilding of Stadion im. Ojca Władysława Augustynka, Sandecja Nowy Sącz will be playing their home matches in Stadion Garbarnii in Kraków.

== League table ==
| Pos | Team | Pld | W | D | L | GF | GA | GD | Pts | Promotion or Relegation |
|---|---|---|---|---|---|---|---|---|---|---|
| 1 | Pogoń Siedlce (C, P) | 34 | 16 | 10 | 8 | 57 | 45 | +12 | 58 | Promotion to I liga |
| 2 | Kotwica Kołobrzeg (P) | 34 | 16 | 8 | 10 | 61 | 44 | +17 | 56 | Promotion to I liga |
| 3 | KKS 1925 Kalisz | 34 | 15 | 10 | 9 | 48 | 32 | +16 | 55 | Qualification for promotion play-offs |
| 4 | Stal Stalowa Wola (O, P) | 34 | 15 | 9 | 10 | 44 | 38 | +6 | 54 (Note: Stal Stalowa Wola finished ahead of Chojniczanka Chojnice on head-to-head points: Stal Stalowa Wola 5–2 Chojniczanka Chojnice, Chojniczanka Chojnice 1–1 Stal Stalowa Wola) | Qualification for promotion play-offs |
| 5 | Chojniczanka Chojnice | 34 | 15 | 9 | 10 | 49 | 44 | +5 | 54 | Qualification for promotion play-offs |
| 6 | Polonia Bytom | 34 | 14 | 11 | 9 | 57 | 48 | +9 | 53 | Qualification for promotion play-offs |
| 7 | Radunia Stężyca (Note: Radunia withdrew from the competition at the end of the season.) (R) | 34 | 13 | 11 | 10 | 48 | 45 | +3 | 50 | Relegation to IV liga |
| 8 | Hutnik Kraków | 34 | 13 | 10 | 11 | 47 | 43 | +4 | 49 | |
| 9 | Zagłębie Lubin II | 34 | 13 | 7 | 14 | 48 | 47 | +1 | 46 | |
| 10 | ŁKS Łódź II | 34 | 12 | 9 | 13 | 46 | 49 | −3 | 45 | |
| 11 | GKS Jastrzębie | 34 | 11 | 10 | 13 | 43 | 48 | −5 | 43 | |
| 12 | Wisła Puławy | 34 | 9 | 14 | 11 | 48 | 50 | −2 | 41 | |
| 13 | Olimpia Elbląg | 34 | 10 | 10 | 14 | 35 | 46 | −11 | 40 (Note: Olimpia Elbląg finished ahead of Olimpia Grudziądz and Skra Częstochowa on head-to-head points: Olimpia Elbląg 9, Olimpia Grudziądz 5, Skra Częstochowa 2) | |
| 14 | Olimpia Grudziądz | 34 | 10 | 10 | 14 | 35 | 42 | −7 | 40 | |
| 15 | Skra Częstochowa | 34 | 10 | 10 | 14 | 40 | 43 | −3 | 40 | |
| 16 | Lech Poznań II (R) | 34 | 10 | 9 | 15 | 34 | 50 | −16 | 39 | Relegation to III liga |
| 17 | Sandecja Nowy Sącz (R) | 34 | 9 | 8 | 17 | 34 | 48 | −14 | 35 | Relegation to III liga |
| 18 | Stomil Olsztyn (R) | 34 | 9 | 7 | 18 | 30 | 42 | −12 | 34 | Relegation to III liga |

Source: 90minut.pl
Rules for classification: 1) Points; 2) Head-to-head points; 3) Head-to-head goal difference; 4) Goal difference; 6) Goals scored; 7) Number of wins; 8) Number of away wins.
(Note: Head-to-head record was used only after all the matches between the teams in question have been played)
(C) Champions; (O) Play-off winner; (P) Promoted; (R) Relegated

== Positions by round ==
Note: The place taken by the team that played fewer matches than the opponents was underlined. (Note: The list of postponed matches: Zagłębie Lubin II – Kotwica Kołobrzeg (8th round, played on 20 September 2023); Olimpia Elbląg – Pogoń Siedlce (8th round, played on 20 September 2023); Lech Poznań II – Stomil Olsztyn (13th round, played on 8 November 2023); Zagłębie Lubin II – GKS Jastrzębie (13th round, played on 26 October 2023); Skra Częstochowa – Hutnik Kraków (18th round, played on 29 November 2023); Lech Poznań II – Olimpia Elbląg (18th round, played on 28 February 2024); Stal Stalowa Wola – Wisła Puławy (20th round, played on 20 March 2024); Sandecja Nowy Sącz – Radunia Stężyca (20th round, played on 5 March 2024); Polonia Bytom – Skra Częstochowa (20th round, played on 17 February 2024); Pogoń Siedlce – Stomil Olsztyn (20th round, played on 13 March 2024); GKS Jastrzębie – KKS 1925 Kalisz (20th round, played on 13 March 2024); Olimpia Grudziądz – Olimpia Elbląg (20th round, played on 6 March 2024); Kotwica Kołobrzeg - Zagłębie Lubin II (25th round, played on 9 April 2024); Lech Poznań II - GKS Jastrzębie (25th round, played on 10 April 2024))

| Team ╲ Round | 1 | 2 | 3 | 4 | 5 | 6 | 7 | 8 | 9 | 10 | 11 | 12 | 13 | 14 | 15 | 16 | 17 | 18 | 19 | 20 | 21 | 22 | 23 | 24 | 25 | 26 | 27 | 28 | 29 | 30 | 31 | 32 | 33 | 34 |
|---|---|---|---|---|---|---|---|---|---|---|---|---|---|---|---|---|---|---|---|---|---|---|---|---|---|---|---|---|---|---|---|---|---|---|
| Pogoń Siedlce | 9 | 4 | 6 | 11 | 11 | 9 | 9 | 10 | 7 | 10 | 6 | 4 | 3 | 2 | 3 | 2 | 3 | 2 | 3 | 3 | 3 | 3 | 3 | 3 | 2 | 2 | 1 | 1 | 1 | 1 | 1 | 1 | 2 | 1 |
| Kotwica Kołobrzeg | 14 | 7 | 2 | 3 | 7 | 11 | 12 | 13 | 10 | 7 | 4 | 2 | 1 | 3 | 1 | 1 | 1 | 1 | 1 | 1 | 1 | 1 | 1 | 2 | 3 | 3 | 3 | 3 | 3 | 3 | 2 | 2 | 1 | 2 |
| KKS 1925 Kalisz | 14 | 14 | 9 | 4 | 2 | 6 | 5 | 2 | 3 | 1 | 1 | 1 | 2 | 1 | 2 | 3 | 4 | 3 | 2 | 2 | 2 | 2 | 2 | 1 | 1 | 1 | 2 | 2 | 2 | 2 | 3 | 3 | 3 | 3 |
| Stal Stalowa Wola | 11 | 17 | 15 | 17 | 12 | 14 | 15 | 14 | 16 | 15 | 14 | 12 | 12 | 11 | 10 | 10 | 14 | 11 | 9 | 10 | 7 | 7 | 5 | 7 | 7 | 5 | 7 | 8 | 10 | 9 | 7 | 5 | 4 | 4 |
| Chojniczanka Chojnice | 14 | 10 | 13 | 13 | 16 | 15 | 16 | 16 | 14 | 12 | 9 | 7 | 8 | 6 | 5 | 6 | 9 | 9 | 8 | 5 | 6 | 9 | 6 | 4 | 4 | 6 | 4 | 4 | 7 | 5 | 4 | 6 | 5 | 5 |
| Polonia Bytom | 4 | 9 | 14 | 14 | 17 | 17 | 17 | 17 | 15 | 17 | 15 | 15 | 15 | 15 | 17 | 15 | 16 | 16 | 15 | 15 | 13 | 13 | 13 | 13 | 13 | 9 | 9 | 6 | 9 | 10 | 8 | 7 | 6 | 6 |
| Radunia Stężyca | 4 | 5 | 7 | 8 | 6 | 3 | 4 | 1 | 2 | 4 | 3 | 3 | 5 | 4 | 4 | 4 | 2 | 4 | 4 | 4 | 5 | 5 | 4 | 5 | 5 | 4 | 5 | 7 | 5 | 4 | 6 | 8 | 8 | 7 |
| Hutnik Kraków | 1 | 3 | 5 | 10 | 10 | 8 | 6 | 6 | 5 | 8 | 11 | 11 | 9 | 8 | 9 | 9 | 8 | 10 | 7 | 6 | 4 | 4 | 7 | 6 | 8 | 8 | 8 | 10 | 8 | 6 | 5 | 4 | 7 | 8 |
| Zagłębie Lubin II | 3 | 5 | 7 | 2 | 1 | 1 | 1 | 4 | 1 | 2 | 7 | 9 | 11 | 12 | 12 | 13 | 10 | 7 | 11 | 7 | 8 | 11 | 9 | 9 | 10 | 11 | 12 | 9 | 6 | 8 | 10 | 10 | 9 | 9 |
| ŁKS Łódź II | 9 | 15 | 11 | 5 | 3 | 2 | 2 | 3 | 4 | 3 | 2 | 5 | 4 | 7 | 8 | 5 | 7 | 8 | 5 | 8 | 11 | 8 | 8 | 8 | 6 | 7 | 6 | 5 | 4 | 7 | 9 | 9 | 10 | 10 |
| GKS Jastrzębie | 11 | 13 | 16 | 15 | 13 | 10 | 13 | 14 | 16 | 14 | 13 | 14 | 14 | 14 | 13 | 14 | 13 | 14 | 16 | 16 | 16 | 14 | 14 | 14 | 15 | 15 | 15 | 15 | 16 | 15 | 15 | 14 | 13 | 11 |
| Wisła Puławy | 6 | 1 | 1 | 1 | 4 | 5 | 3 | 5 | 6 | 9 | 10 | 8 | 10 | 10 | 11 | 11 | 12 | 12 | 13 | 14 | 15 | 15 | 15 | 15 | 14 | 14 | 11 | 14 | 14 | 13 | 11 | 11 | 11 | 12 |
| Olimpia Elbląg | 7 | 15 | 12 | 6 | 8 | 13 | 11 | 11 | 8 | 5 | 5 | 6 | 7 | 9 | 7 | 8 | 6 | 6 | 10 | 11 | 9 | 10 | 12 | 10 | 11 | 12 | 13 | 13 | 13 | 12 | 12 | 12 | 12 | 13 |
| Olimpia Grudziądz | 2 | 1 | 3 | 7 | 5 | 4 | 7 | 9 | 11 | 16 | 17 | 17 | 16 | 17 | 15 | 16 | 17 | 17 | 18 | 18 | 18 | 17 | 17 | 18 | 18 | 17 | 16 | 16 | 15 | 16 | 16 | 16 | 16 | 14 |
| Skra Częstochowa | 18 | 11 | 4 | 9 | 9 | 7 | 8 | 7 | 9 | 6 | 8 | 10 | 6 | 5 | 6 | 7 | 5 | 5 | 6 | 9 | 10 | 12 | 11 | 12 | 9 | 10 | 10 | 12 | 12 | 14 | 14 | 15 | 14 | 15 |
| Lech Poznań II | 7 | 12 | 18 | 16 | 14 | 16 | 14 | 8 | 12 | 13 | 16 | 16 | 17 | 18 | 16 | 17 | 11 | 13 | 14 | 12 | 12 | 6 | 10 | 11 | 12 | 13 | 14 | 11 | 11 | 11 | 13 | 13 | 15 | 16 |
| Sandecja Nowy Sącz | 17 | 18 | 16 | 18 | 18 | 18 | 18 | 18 | 18 | 18 | 18 | 18 | 18 | 16 | 18 | 18 | 18 | 18 | 17 | 17 | 17 | 18 | 18 | 16 | 17 | 18 | 18 | 18 | 18 | 18 | 18 | 18 | 18 | 17 |
| Stomil Olsztyn | 13 | 8 | 10 | 12 | 15 | 12 | 10 | 12 | 13 | 11 | 12 | 13 | 13 | 13 | 14 | 12 | 15 | 15 | 12 | 13 | 14 | 16 | 16 | 17 | 16 | 16 | 17 | 17 | 17 | 17 | 17 | 17 | 17 | 18 |

| Promotion to I liga |
| Qualification for Promotion play-offs |
| Relegation to III liga |

Source: 90minut.pl

== Results ==
| Home \ Away | CHC | JAS | HUT | KAL | KOT | LP2 | ŁKS | ELB | GRU | PSI | PBT | RAD | SNS | SKC | SSW | STO | WPU | ZA2 |
|---|---|---|---|---|---|---|---|---|---|---|---|---|---|---|---|---|---|---|
| Chojniczanka Chojnice | — | 1–0 | 2–2 | 0–1 | 1–1 | 1–0 | 3–2 | 3–1 | 1–1 | 1–2 | 1–4 | 5–1 | 1–0 | 0–0 | 1–1 | 1–0 | 1–1 | 2–1 |
| GKS Jastrzębie | 2–4 | — | 1–0 | 1–1 | 3–1 | 0–2 | 3–2 | 1–2 | 3–2 | 2–1 | 4–2 | 1–1 | 0–0 | 2–0 | 0–0 | 1–2 | 0–0 | 1–0 |
| Hutnik Kraków | 0–2 | 1–1 | — | 2–1 | 3–5 | 3–0 | 4–1 | 1–0 | 1–2 | 1–1 | 4–1 | 3–1 | 1–2 | 3–0 | 1–1 | 2–1 | 1–1 | 1–1 |
| KKS 1925 Kalisz | 0–1 | 3–1 | 3–0 | — | 0–2 | 2–1 | 2–2 | 0–1 | 2–2 | 5–1 | 0–0 | 0–1 | 1–2 | 4–1 | 1–0 | 0–0 | 1–0 | 3–1 |
| Kotwica Kołobrzeg | 3–0 | 2–0 | 2–0 | 2–1 | — | 1–2 | 0–1 | 2–0 | 1–2 | 2–2 | 0–1 | 1–1 | 2–1 | 0–1 | 1–0 | 2–0 | 3–2 | 1–2 |
| Lech Poznań II | 1–2 | 2–0 | 4–3 | 1–1 | 1–5 | — | 0–3 | 2–1 | 0–0 | 0–4 | 1–0 | 1–2 | 0–1 | 1–1 | 0–0 | 1–0 | 0–1 | 2–1 |
| ŁKS Łódź II | 3–2 | 0–3 | 0–0 | 3–0 | 2–3 | 2–2 | — | 1–1 | 1–1 | 1–2 | 0–2 | 2–2 | 1–0 | 1–3 | 3–0 | 2–0 | 2–1 | 2–1 |
| Olimpia Elbląg | 2–1 | 2–1 | 0–0 | 0–0 | 2–3 | 2–2 | 1–3 | — | 1–0 | 1–0 | 1–3 | 0–1 | 4–1 | 2–1 | 0–0 | 1–1 | 3–2 | 1–2 |
| Olimpia Grudziądz | 0–1 | 2–1 | 0–2 | 0–1 | 0–0 | 1–2 | 1–1 | 3–0 | — | 2–3 | 1–0 | 1–1 | 3–1 | 0–0 | 1–3 | 3–0 | 1–0 | 0–2 |
| Pogoń Siedlce | 2–3 | 3–4 | 1–1 | 0–2 | 3–3 | 2–0 | 1–1 | 1–0 | 0–0 | — | 3–3 | 0–3 | 3–0 | 2–1 | 2–0 | 1–0 | 2–2 | 2–1 |
| Polonia Bytom | 1–1 | 0–0 | 0–1 | 1–1 | 3–3 | 3–0 | 2–1 | 2–1 | 2–1 | 1–1 | — | 2–1 | 4–2 | 2–2 | 4–3 | 4–3 | 2–2 | 3–1 |
| Radunia Stężyca | 1–2 | 3–0 | 1–1 | 1–4 | 1–1 | 1–0 | 0–0 | 1–1 | 5–1 | 1–2 | 1–1 | — | 1–1 | 3–2 | 0–2 | 1–0 | 1–3 | 3–0 |
| Sandecja Nowy Sącz | 1–1 | 1–3 | 0–1 | 0–2 | 3–1 | 0–0 | 0–1 | 0–0 | 1–0 | 2–3 | 3–2 | 2–1 | — | 2–2 | 2–0 | 0–0 | 1–2 | 1–1 |
| Skra Częstochowa | 0–0 | 0–0 | 1–2 | 4–1 | 1–0 | 0–2 | 3–0 | 1–2 | 0–0 | 0–1 | 1–0 | 1–1 | 1–0 | — | 1–2 | 2–2 | 4–1 | 2–1 |
| Stal Stalowa Wola | 5–2 | 3–1 | 2–1 | 0–1 | 1–1 | 3–1 | 1–0 | 0–0 | 2–0 | 2–1 | 1–0 | 1–2 | 2–1 | 3–1 | — | 0–1 | 2–2 | 2–1 |
| Stomil Olsztyn | 2–1 | 2–0 | 3–0 | 0–3 | 2–1 | 1–0 | 0–1 | 1–1 | 0–1 | 0–0 | 0–1 | 2–3 | 1–0 | 2–1 | 0–1 | — | 1–1 | 1–2 |
| Wisła Puławy | 1–0 | 2–2 | 0–1 | 1–1 | 1–3 | 2–2 | 3–1 | 4–0 | 3–1 | 0–3 | 0–0 | 0–1 | 1–3 | 1–0 | 1–1 | 2–1 | — | 3–3 |
| Zagłębie Lubin II | 2–1 | 1–1 | 2–0 | 0–0 | 2–3 | 1–1 | 1–0 | 2–1 | 1–2 | 0–2 | 3–0 | 2–0 | 2–1 | 0–2 | 4–0 | 2–1 | 2–2 | — |

Source: 90minut.pl
Legend: Blue = home team win; Yellow = draw; Red = away team win.
For upcoming matches, an "a" indicates there is an article about the rivalry between the two participants.

== Results by round ==
| Team ╲ Round | 1 | 2 | 3 | 4 | 5 | 6 | 7 | 8 | 9 | 10 | 11 | 12 | 13 | 14 | 15 | 16 | 17 | 18 | 19 | 20 | 21 | 22 | 23 | 24 | 25 | 26 | 27 | 28 | 29 | 30 | 31 | 32 | 33 | 34 |
|---|---|---|---|---|---|---|---|---|---|---|---|---|---|---|---|---|---|---|---|---|---|---|---|---|---|---|---|---|---|---|---|---|---|---|
| Chojniczanka Chojnice | L | W | L | D | L | D | L | D | W | W | W | W | D | W | D | L | L | D | W | W | L | D | W | W | D | L | W | D | L | W | W | L | W | W |
| GKS Jastrzębie | D | L | L | W | D | W | L | L | L | W | D | D | L | D | W | D | W | L | L | D | W | D | D | L | W | L | L | W | L | W | L | W | D | W |
| Hutnik Kraków | W | D | D | L | D | W | W | L | W | L | L | L | W | W | L | L | W | W | W | L | D | D | D | D | D | L | W | D | W | W | D | W | L | L |
| KKS 1925 Kalisz | L | D | W | W | W | L | W | W | L | W | W | D | D | W | L | D | L | W | W | W | D | D | D | W | D | W | L | L | D | L | D | L | W | W |
| Kotwica Kołobrzeg | L | W | W | D | L | L | D | W | W | D | W | W | W | L | W | W | W | D | W | L | W | D | L | D | L | D | L | W | L | D | W | W | W | L |
| Lech Poznań II | D | L | L | W | D | L | W | W | L | D | L | L | L | W | D | W | W | L | W | D | W | W | L | D | L | L | W | D | D | L | D | L | L | L |
| ŁKS Łódź II | D | L | W | W | W | W | L | W | L | D | W | L | D | L | D | W | L | L | W | L | L | W | D | D | W | L | W | D | W | D | L | D | L | L |
| Olimpia Elbląg | D | L | W | W | L | L | W | W | W | D | D | D | D | L | W | L | W | L | W | L | D | L | L | W | L | L | L | D | D | W | D | D | L | L |
| Olimpia Grudziądz | W | W | L | L | W | D | D | L | L | L | L | L | D | L | W | D | L | L | L | D | D | W | L | D | D | W | W | D | W | D | L | W | L | W |
| Pogoń Siedlce | D | W | D | L | D | W | D | W | L | D | W | W | W | W | L | W | D | W | L | L | D | W | W | D | W | W | D | D | W | L | W | L | L | W |
| Polonia Bytom | W | L | L | D | L | L | D | D | W | L | W | D | L | L | D | W | L | D | W | D | W | W | D | D | D | W | W | W | D | L | W | W | W | W |
| Radunia Stężyca | W | D | D | D | W | W | D | W | D | L | W | D | L | W | D | W | W | L | L | L | D | L | W | D | D | W | L | L | W | W | L | D | L | W |
| Sandecja Nowy Sącz | L | L | D | L | D | L | L | L | W | L | L | W | D | W | L | D | L | W | D | D | L | W | L | W | L | L | D | W | L | L | L | D | W | W |
| Skra Częstochowa | L | W | W | L | D | W | D | D | D | W | D | L | W | W | L | L | W | D | L | D | L | L | W | D | D | L | W | L | L | L | W | L | D | L |
| Stal Stalowa Wola | D | L | D | L | W | L | L | W | L | W | D | W | L | W | W | L | L | W | W | W | D | W | L | D | D | W | L | D | D | D | W | W | W | W |
| Stomil Olsztyn | L | W | D | L | L | W | W | L | L | W | L | D | W | L | W | L | L | L | W | D | L | L | L | L | D | W | D | L | D | W | L | L | D | L |
| Wisła Puławy | W | W | D | W | L | L | W | D | L | D | L | W | L | L | D | D | D | D | L | D | D | D | L | D | D | W | W | L | L | W | W | D | D | L |
| Zagłębie Lubin II | W | D | D | W | W | W | L | W | L | L | L | L | L | D | D | L | W | W | L | W | D | L | W | D | L | L | W | W | W | L | L | D | W | L |

Source: 90minut.pl
W = Win; D = Draw; L = Loss

== Promotion play-offs ==
II liga play-offs for the 2023–24 season will be played on 29 May and 1 June 2024. The teams who finished in 3rd, 4th, 5th and 6th place are set to compete. The fixtures are determined by final league position – 3rd team of regular season vs 6th team of regular season and 4th team of regular season vs 5th team of regular season. The winner of final match will be promoted to the I liga for the 2024–25 season. All matches will be played in a stadiums of team which occupied higher position in regular season.

Semi-finals; 29 May 2024
3 | KKS 1925 Kalisz | 1
6 | Polonia Bytom | 0
4 | Stal Stalowa Wola | 2
5 | Chojniczanka Chojnice | 1

Final; 1 June 2024
3 | KKS 1925 Kalisz | 1
4 | Stal Stalowa Wola | 2

=== Matches ===
==== Semi-finals ====
29 May 2024
16:00 CEST

| KKS 1925 Kalisz | 1–0 | Polonia Bytom |
|---|---|---|
| Sobol 76' | Łączy nas piłka 90minut |

Stadion Miejski, Kalisz
Attendance: 996
Referee: Daniel Stefański (Bydgoszcz)
29 May 2024
18:45 CEST

| Stal Stalowa Wola | 2–1 | Chojniczanka Chojnice |
|---|---|---|
| Urban 60'; Pioterczak 90+2' | Łączy nas piłka 90minut | Boczek 90+5' |

Podkarpackie Centrum Piłki Nożnej, Stalowa Wola
Attendance: 3,764
Referee: Łukasz Kuźma (Białystok)

==== Final ====
1 June 2024
16:30 CEST

| KKS 1925 Kalisz | 1–2 | Stal Stalowa Wola |
|---|---|---|
| Sobol 3' | Łączy nas piłka 90minut | Górski 51' (pen.), 52' |

Stadion Miejski, Kalisz
Attendance: 2,436
Referee: Bartosz Frankowski (Toruń)

== Season statistics ==
=== Top goalscorers ===
| Rank | Player | Club | Goals |
|---|---|---|---|
| 1 | (Brazil) Jonathan | Kotwica Kołobrzeg | 23 |
| 2 | (Poland) Hubert Sobol | KKS 1925 Kalisz | 21 |
| 3 | (Poland) Cezary Demianiuk | Pogoń Siedlce | 17 |
| 4 | (Poland) Mateusz Kuzimski | Radunia Stężyca | 16 |
| 5 | (Poland) Michał Bednarski | KKS 1925 Kalisz | 11 |
| 5 | (Latvia) Deniss Rakels | Hutnik Kraków | 11 |
| 7 | (Poland) Dawid Wolny | Polonia Bytom | 10 |
| 8 | (Poland) Tomasz Gajda | Polonia Bytom | 9 |
| 8 | (Poland) Dawid Retlewski | Wisła Puławy (8); Stomil Olsztyn (1) | 9 |
| 8 | (Poland) Przemysław Sajdak | Skra Częstochowa | 9 |
| 8 | (Poland) Kamil Wojtyra | Polonia Bytom | 9 |

== Attendances ==
| Pos | Team | Total | High | Low | Average | Change |
|---|---|---|---|---|---|---|
| 1 | Stal Stalowa Wola | 34,649 | 3,764 | 1,215 | 2,038 | n/a^{2} |
| 2 | Stomil Olsztyn | 30,541 | 4,205 | 1,170 | 1,796 | +11.3% |
| 3 | Kotwica Kołobrzeg | 22,701 | 2,830 | 600 | 1,335 | −24.0% |
| 4 | KKS 1925 Kalisz | 22,175 | 2,380 | 700 | 1,304 | +9.5% |
| 5 | Pogoń Siedlce | 18,575 | 2,711 | 503 | 1,092 | +54.9% |
| 6 | GKS Jastrzębie | 15,500 | 1,814 | 502 | 911 | +9.9% |
| 7 | Olimpia Elbląg | 15,258 | 2,568 | 352 | 897 | −6.1% |
| 8 | Chojniczanka Chojnice | 13,709 | 1,448 | 0 | 806 | −37.1%^{1} |
| 9 | Hutnik Kraków | 13,100 | 985 | 590 | 770 | +13.6% |
| 10 | Polonia Bytom | 12,751 | 1,178 | 283 | 750 | n/a^{2} |
| 11 | Olimpia Grudziądz | 9,975 | 1,170 | 305 | 586 | n/a^{2} |
| 12 | Wisła Puławy | 9,132 | 917 | 312 | 537 | −14.8% |
| 13 | Radunia Stężyca | 6,551 | 870 | 185 | 385 | −4.5% |
| 14 | ŁKS Łódź II | 5,546 | 947 | 100 | 326 | n/a^{2} |
| 15 | Sandecja Nowy Sącz | 2,940 | 608 | 52 | 172 | −35.1%^{1} |
| 16 | Zagłębie Lubin II | 2,691 | 423 | 75 | 158 | −20.6% |
| 17 | Lech Poznań II | 1,497 | 162 | 46 | 88 | +31.3% |
| 18 | Skra Częstochowa | 0 | 0 | 0 | 0 | −100.0%^{1} |
| | League total | 239,291 | 4,205 | 0 | 782 | −15.8% |

Source: 90minut.pl (in Polish)
Notes:
1. Team played last season in I liga.
2. Team played last season in III liga.

== Number of teams by region ==
| Number | Region | Team(s) |
|---|---|---|
| 3 | Silesian Voivodeship | GKS Jastrzębie, Polonia Bytom and Skra Częstochowa |
| 2 | Greater Poland Voivodeship | KKS 1925 Kalisz and Lech Poznań II |
| 2 | Lesser Poland Voivodeship | Hutnik Kraków and Sandecja Nowy Sącz |
| 2 | Pomeranian Voivodeship | Chojniczanka Chojnice and Radunia Stężyca |
| 2 | Warmian-Masurian Voivodeship | Olimpia Elbląg and Stomil Olsztyn |
| 1 | Kuyavian-Pomeranian Voivodeship | Olimpia Grudziądz |
| 1 | Lower Silesian Voivodeship | Zagłębie Lubin II |
| 1 | Lublin Voivodeship | Wisła Puławy |
| 1 | Łódź Voivodeship | ŁKS Łódź II |
| 1 | Masovian Voivodeship | Pogoń Siedlce |
| 1 | Podkarpackie Voivodeship | Stal Stalowa Wola |
| 1 | West Pomeranian Voivodeship | Kotwica Kołobrzeg |
| 0 | Lubusz Voivodeship | |
| 0 | Opole Voivodeship | |
| 0 | Podlaskie Voivodeship | |
| 0 | Świętokrzyskie Voivodeship | |

== See also ==
- 2023–24 Ekstraklasa
- 2023–24 I liga
- 2023–24 III liga
- 2023–24 Polish Cup
- 2023 Polish Super Cup
