= Bartosz Wolski (footballer) =

Polish footballer (born 1997)

Personal information
- Date of birth: 12 May 1997 (age 29)
- Place of birth: Aleksandrów Kujawski, Poland
- Height: 1.77 m (5 ft 10 in)
- Position: Midfielder

Team information
- Current team: GKS Katowice
- Number: 68

Youth career
- 2005–2013: Elana Toruń
- 2013–2016: Latina

Senior career*
Years	Team	Apps	(Gls)
2013	Elana Toruń	3	(0)
2016–2018	Genoa	0	(0)
2016–2017	→ Cesena (loan)	0	(0)
2017–2018	→ Bytovia Bytów (loan)	40	(1)
2018–2019	Bytovia Bytów	24	(2)
2019–2020	Chojniczanka Chojnice	32	(2)
2020–2023	Stal Rzeszów	93	(4)
2023–2026	Motor Lublin	101	(16)
2026–	GKS Katowice	2	(0)

International career
2016	Poland U20	2	(0)
- * Club domestic league appearances and goals as of 10:27, 3 August 2026 (UTC)

Bartosz Wolski (born 12 May 1997) is a Polish professional footballer who plays as a midfielder for Ekstraklasa club GKS Katowice.

== Club career ==
=== Early career ===
Born in Aleksandrów Kujawski, Wolski developed his youth career at Elana Toruń. In 2013, he moved abroad to join the youth setup of Italian club Latina. On 30 August 2016, he signed with Genoa.

=== Return to Poland ===
In 2017, Wolski returned to Poland and moved to Bytovia Bytów on loan. After establishing himself as a regular first-team player in the I liga, he joined Bytovia on a permanent basis on 31 July 2018. He subsequently moved to Chojniczanka Chojnice in 2019. On 5 October 2020, Wolski joined II liga club Stal Rzeszów, helping the team achieve promotion to the I liga during his three-year tenure.

=== Motor Lublin ===
In 2023, Wolski joined Motor Lublin. He quickly became a vital part of the squad, serving as the team's captain. During the 2025–26 Ekstraklasa campaign, he featured in all 34 league games, scoring five goals and providing eight assists.

=== GKS Katowice ===
On 9 June 2026, GKS Katowice announced the signing of Wolski from Motor Lublin after triggering his release clause. He signed a contract running until 30 June 2029.

== Honours ==
Stal Rzeszów

- II liga: 2021–22
