= Milton Wolsky =

American painter and illustrator

- Born: 1916; Omaha, Nebraska, U.S.
- Died: 1981 (aged 64–65); Omaha, Nebraska, U.S.
- Occupations: Painter, illustrator

Milton Wolsky (1916–1981) was an American painter and illustrator. He was educated in his hometown of Omaha, Nebraska and in Chicago, Illinois, and he worked as a magazine illustrator in New York City in the 1940s–1950s. His work can be seen at the Museum of Nebraska Art and the Joslyn Art Museum.
