= Kotwica Kołobrzeg =

Polish football club (1946–2025)

- Full name: Miejski Klub Piłkarski; Kotwica Kołobrzeg
- Nickname: Kotwa
- Founded: 15 August 1946
- Dissolved: 23 June 2025; 16 months ago
- Ground: Kołobrzeg Municipal Stadium
- Capacity: 3,014
- 2024–25: I liga, 16th of 18 (relegated)
- Website: kotwicakolobrzeg.com
Home colours	Away colours	Third colours

Miejski Klub Piłkarski Kotwica Kołobrzeg (lit. 'Municipal Football Club Kotwica Kołobrzeg', Polish pronunciation: [ˈmjɛjskʲi klup piwˈkarskʲi kɔtˈfit͡sa kɔˈwɔbʐɛk]), commonly known as MKP Kotwica Kołobrzeg or simply Kotwica Kołobrzeg (Polish pronunciation: [kɔˈtfit͡sa kɔˈwɔbʐɛk]), was a Polish football club based in Kołobrzeg.

Founded on 15 August 1946, the club filed for insolvency on 23 June 2025 and entered liquidation proceedings, effectively ceasing first‑team operations. In the aftermath, supporters and local activists established a phoenix club, Morski Klub Sportowy “Kotwica” Kołobrzeg (lit. 'Maritime Sports Club Kotwica Kołobrzeg'), which retained the historic crest and white‑and‑blue colours and was admitted by the West Pomeranian FA to the Klasa okręgowa (sixth tier) Group I for the 2025–26 season. The court later rejected the MKP Kotwica's bankruptcy petition.

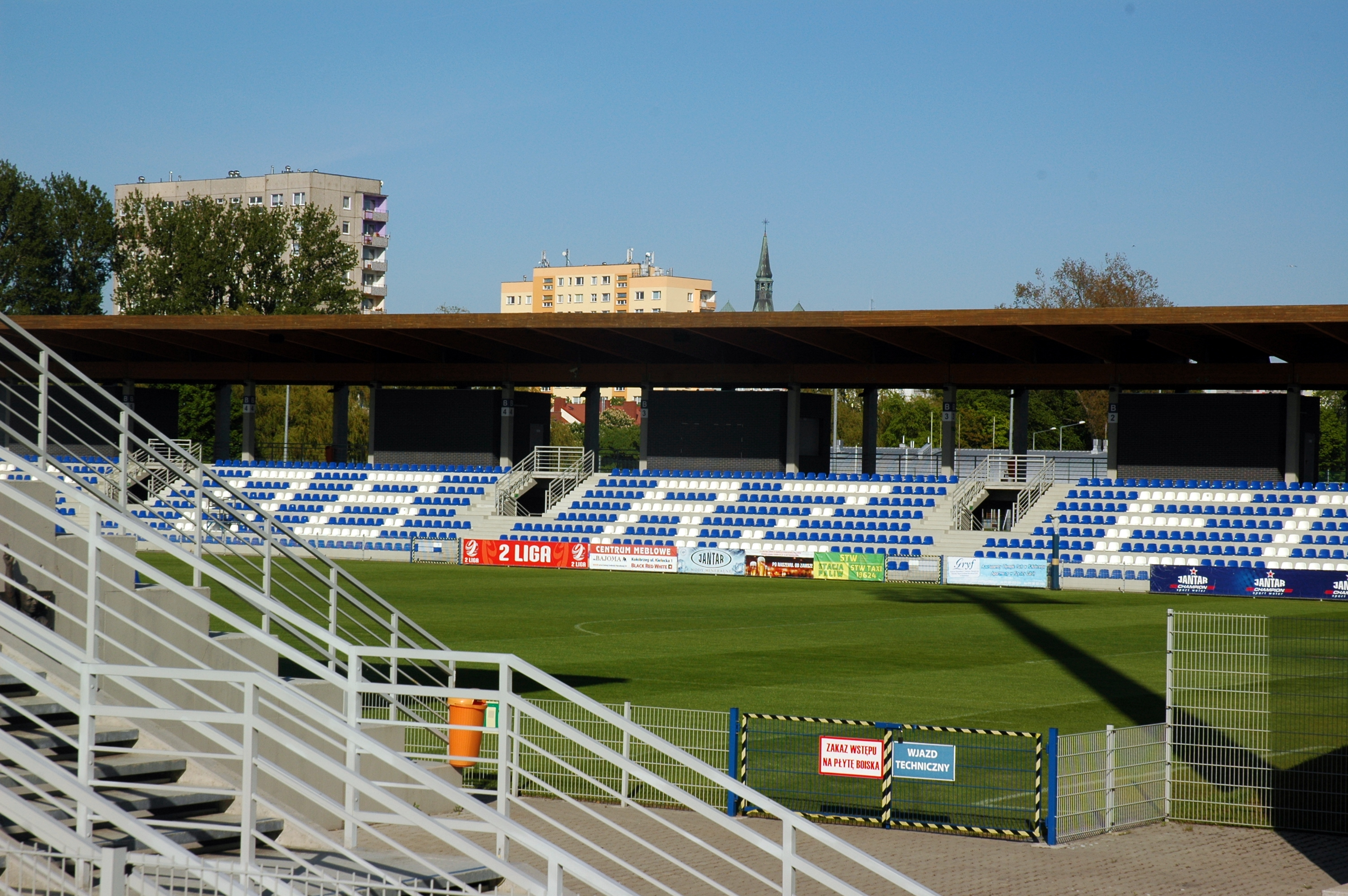
Ground

== History ==
Kotwica spent much of its history in the lower national divisions.

On 19 May 2024, the final matchday of the 2023–24 II liga season, Kotwica won 2–0 against Hutnik Kraków at home and secured their first-ever promotion to the second tier. Despite their historical success, Kotwica continued to be marred by financial and management issues from previous years, such as unpaid wages, lack of involvement from chairman Adam Dzik, alleged poor treatment of injured and unwanted players, which included suing them for "reputational damage", and taking legal action against journalists reporting on the club.

On 26 May 2025, they were relegated after a 2–1 loss to Bruk-Bet Termalica Nieciecza and Pogoń Siedlce's 2–1 win over Warta Poznań on the last matchday.

Kotwica were denied a license to compete in the 2025–26 II liga, and did not appeal the decision. On 23 June 2025, a day after releasing all players and coaching staff via an e-mail, Kotwica filed for insolvency. On 25 June, a phoenix club was established under the name of Morski Klub Sportowy “Kotwica” Kołobrzeg (lit. 'Maritime Sports Club Kotwica Kołobrzeg'), retaining the rights to its predecessor's name, crest and records.

On 1 August 2025, the District Court in Koszalin issued a decision in case no. KO1K/GU/220/2025. It declared that the evidence presented did not support immediate liquidation of the association without undergoing formal liquidation proceedings. Accordingly, the request for bankruptcy was dismissed.

== Honours ==
- II liga
  - Runners-up: 2023–24
- III liga
  - Koszalin-Szczecin
    - Champions: 1998–99
  - Pomerania-West Pomerania
    - Champions: 2013–14
    - Runners-up: 2012–13
  - Group II
    - Champions: 2021–22
- Polish Cup (West Pomerania regionals)
  - Winners: 2003–04, 2005–06, 2007–08, 2011–12, 2013–14
  - Runners-up: 2017–18, 2018–19
- Polish Cup (Koszalin regionals)
  - Winners: 1999–2000, 2003–04, 2005–06, 2007–08, 2011–12, 2013–14
  - Runners-up: 2004–05
