= ŁKS Łódź II =

Polish football club

- Full name: Łódzki Klub Sportowy S.A. II
- Ground: Władysław Król Municipal Stadium
- Capacity: 18,033
- Chairman: Jarosław Olszowy
- Manager: Radosław Pęciak
- League: III liga, group I
- 2025–26: II liga, 17th of 18 (relegated)
- Website: lkslodz.pl/akademia/lks-ii-lodz/
| Home colours | Away colours |

ŁKS Łódź II is a Polish football team, which serves as the reserve side of ŁKS Łódź. As of the 2026–27 season, they compete in group I of the III liga, the fourth tier of the Polish league system.

== History ==
While it is unclear when ŁKS's reserve side was established, the earlier mentions of the team's activity date back to 1927, when they competed in the Łódź Klasa A regional league.

In recent times, ŁKS II was disbanded after suffering relegation from IV liga Łódź at the end of the 2010–11 season. It was re-established in 2015, and began their climb through the Polish league system, earning promotions from the eighth tier to II liga, the third division, in eight years. They finished the 2023–24 season in tenth, one place and one point behind fellow reserve side Zagłębie Lubin II. After three seasons in the third tier, they were relegated back to the III liga after finishing the 2025–26 season in 17th place.

== Current squad ==
As of 5 February 2026

Note: Flags indicate national team as defined under FIFA eligibility rules; some limited exceptions apply. Players may hold more than one non-FIFA nationality.

| No. | Pos. | Nation | Player |
|---|---|---|---|
| 2 | MF | POL | Szymon Frakowski |
| 4 | DF | POL | Maksymilian Rozwandowicz |
| 5 | DF | POL | Aleksander Ślęzak (captain) |
| 9 | FW | POL | Alan Siwek |
| 17 | MF | MLI | Lamine Coulibaly |
| 24 | FW | POL | Patryk Grabowski |
| — | MF | POL | Wiktor Figurski |
| — | MF | POL | Victor Kabziński |
| — | MF | POL | Marcel Kiełbasiński |

| No. | Pos. | Nation | Player |
|---|---|---|---|
| — | GK | POL | Bartosz Klimek |
| — | MF | POL | Jan Kniat |
| — | DF | POL | Mikołaj Kotarba |
| — | MF | POL | Kacper Miązek |
| — | MF | POL | Patryk Pastusiak |
| — | GK | POL | Jakub Pawlak |
| — | DF | POL | Damian Sokołowski |
| — | MF | POL | Błażej Tłaczała |
| — | DF | POL | Krystian Wilk |

== Honours ==
- III liga, group I
  - Champions: 2022–23
- IV liga Łódź
  - Champions: 2020–21
- Regional league Łódź
  - Champions: 2018–19
- Klasa A Łódź II
  - Champions: 2016–17
- Klasa B Łódź I
  - Champions: 2015–16
- Polish Cup (Łódź regionals)
  - Champions: 1991–92
  - Runners-up: 2020–21
