= 2024–25 Polonia Warsaw season =

Polonia Warsaw
2024–25 season
- Manager: Rafał Smalec (until 13 August)
- Stadium: Kazimierz Sosnkowski Stadium
- I liga: 17th
- Polish Cup: Pre-season
- Biggest defeat: Polonia Warsaw 0–3 Arka Gdynia
Home colours	Away colours

The 2024–25 season is the 114th season in the history of Polonia Warsaw, and the club's second consecutive season in the I liga. In addition to the domestic league, the team is scheduled to participate in the Polish Cup.

== Transfers ==
=== In ===
Pos.	Player	Transferred from	Fee	Date	Source
MF	(Poland) Ernest Terpiłowski	(Poland) Widzew Łódź	Free	9 July 2024	
MF	(Poland) Bartłomiej Poczobut	(Poland) Polonia Warsaw	Free	13 July 2024	
MF	(Turkey) İlkay Durmuş	(Poland) Górnik Łęczna	Undisclosed	16 July 2024	

=== Out ===
Pos.	Player	Transferred to	Fee	Date	Source
DF	(Poland) Filip Arak	(Poland) Avia Świdnik		1 July 2024	
GK	(Poland) Adrian Sandach	(Poland) OKS Świt Skolwin	Loan	9 July 2024	

== Friendlies ==
=== Pre-season ===
29 June 2024 Friendly	Wisła Płock (Poland)	1–3	(Poland) Polonia Warsaw

6 July 2024 Friendly	Pogoń Siedlce (Poland)	2–3	(Poland) Polonia Warsaw
11:00
Note: Two periods of 60 minutes

12 July 2024 Friendly	Polonia Warsaw (Poland)	2–4	(Poland) Pogoń Grodzisk Mazowiecki

12 July 2024 Friendly	Polonia Warsaw (Poland)	3–0	(Poland) Lechia Tomaszów Mazowiecki

20 July 2024 Friendly	Unia Skierniewice (Poland)	2–1	(Poland) Polonia Warsaw
11:00

== Competitions ==
=== Overall record ===
Competition	First match	Last match	Starting round	Record							
Competition	First match	Last match	Starting round	Pld	W	D	L	GF	GA	GD	Win %
I liga	19 July 2024	25–26 May 2025	Matchday 1	6	0	1	5	1	9	−8	0.00
Polish Cup				0	0	0	0	0	0	+0	—
Total				6	0	1	5	1	9	−8	0.00

Last updated: 20 August 2024
Source: Soccerway

=== I liga ===
==== League table ====
Pos	Team	Pld	W	D	L	GF	GA	GD	Pts	Promotion or Relegation
4	Wisła Kraków	34	18	8	8	63	32	+31	62	Qualification for the promotion play-offs
5	Miedź Legnica	34	16	8	10	56	45	+11	56 (Note: Ranked based on goal difference: Miedź Legnica +11, Polonia Warsaw +9.)	Qualification for the promotion play-offs
6	Polonia Warsaw	34	16	8	10	46	37	+9	56	Qualification for the promotion play-offs
7	GKS Tychy	34	13	14	7	47	36	+11	53	
8	Znicz Pruszków	34	14	10	10	52	43	+9	52	

Source: 1liga.org, 90minut.pl
Rules for classification: 1) Points; 2) Head-to-head points; 3) Head-to-head goal difference; 4) Goal difference; 6) Goals scored; 7) Number of wins; 8) Number of away wins.
(Note: Head-to-head record is used only after all the matches between the teams in question have been played)
Notes:

Semi-finals; 29 May 2025
3	Wisła Płock	2
6	Polonia Warsaw	1
4	Wisła Kraków	0
5	Miedź Legnica	1

Final; 1 June 2025
3	Wisła Płock	2
5	Miedź Legnica	0

==== Results summary ====
Overall								Home						Away					
Pld	W	D	L	GF	GA	GD	Pts	W	D	L	GF	GA	GD	W	D	L	GF	GA	GD
6	0	1	5	1	9	−8	1	0	0	3	0	5	−5	0	1	2	1	4	−3

Last updated: 20 August 2024.

==== Results by round ====
Round	1	2	3	4	5
Ground	H	A	H	A	H
Result	L	D	L	L	
Position	14				

Updated to match(es) played on 10 August 2024. Source:
A = Away; H = Home; W = Win; D = Draw; L = Loss

==== Matches ====
The match schedule was released on 12 June 2024.

19 July 2024 1	Polonia Warsaw	0–1	Znicz Pruszków	Warsaw
18:00			Wiech 88'	Stadium: Kazimierz Sosnkowski Stadium; Referee: Jacek Małyszek

28 July 2024 2	Wisła Kraków	0–0	Polonia Warsaw	Kraków
14:30 UTC+2	Biedrzycki (red card) 57'			Stadium: Henryk Reyman Stadium; Referee: Tomasz Wajda

3 August 2024 3	Polonia Warsaw	0–3	Arka Gdynia	Warsaw
19:35			Sobczak 18'; Vitalucci 70'; Czubak 90+1'	Stadium: Kazimierz Sosnkowski Stadium; Referee: Wojciech Myć

10 August 2024 4	Górnik Łęczna	3–1	Polonia Warsaw	Łęczna
14:30 UTC+2				Stadium: Łęczna Stadium; Referee: Tomasz Wajda

17 August 2024 5	Polonia Warsaw	v	Miedź Legnica	Warsaw
14:30				Stadium: Kazimierz Sosnkowski Stadium

=== Polish Cup ===
24 September 2024 First round	Chrobry Głogów	v	Polonia Warsaw	Głogów
18:00				Stadium: Głogów Municipal Stadium
