= Damian Węglarz =

Polish footballer

Personal information
- Date of birth: 21 March 1996 (age 30)
- Place of birth: Bydgoszcz, Poland
- Height: 1.89 m (6 ft 2 in)
- Position: Goalkeeper

Team information
- Current team: ŁKS Łódź
- Number: 77

Youth career
- –2009: Gwiazda Bydgoszcz
- 2009–2010: AZS UKW Bydgoszcz
- 2010–2012: Zawisza Bydgoszcz

Senior career*
Years	Team	Apps	(Gls)
2012–2015	Zawisza Bydgoszcz II		
2014–2016	Zawisza Bydgoszcz	13	(0)
2016–2021	Jagiellonia Białystok	35	(0)
2018–2019	→ Wigry Suwałki (loan)	35	(0)
2021–2023	Wisła Płock	2	(0)
2022–2023	→ Chrobry Głogów (loan)	12	(0)
2022	→ Chrobry Głogów II (loan)	1	(0)
2023–2024	Chrobry Głogów	33	(0)
2024–2026	Arka Gdynia	52	(0)
2026–	ŁKS Łódź	0	(0)

International career
2016–2017	Poland U20	5	(0)
- * Club domestic league appearances and goals as of 22 May 2026

Damian Węglarz (born 21 March 1996) is a Polish professional footballer who plays as a goalkeeper for I liga club ŁKS Łódź.

== Career ==
=== Zawisza Bydgoszcz ===
Węglarz started his professional career with Zawisza Bydgoszcz.

=== Jagiellonia Białystok ===
Węglarz sustained a broken finger during the match with Lechia Gdańsk but continued to play the full 90 minutes as well as play the complete next match against Legia Warsaw. After the Legia match, the team physician disallowed Węglarz from playing for the next few weeks.

==== Wigry Suwałki (loan) ====
On 18 December 2017, Węglarz was loaned out to Polish second-tier side Wigry Suwałki for the rest of the season.

=== Arka Gdynia ===
He joined Arka Gdynia before the season started in June 2024.

In May 2025, after Arka's relegation to the I liga was confirmed, it was announced he would leave Arka at the end of June. Overall, he made 52 appearances for Arka.

=== ŁKS Łódź ===
On 2 June 2026, Węglarz signed a two-year contract with ŁKS Łódź.

== Career statistics ==
As of match played 7 April 2026

Appearances and goals by club, season and competition
Club	Season	League			Polish Cup		Continental		Other		Total	
Club	Season	Division	Apps	Goals	Apps	Goals	Apps	Goals	Apps	Goals	Apps	Goals
Zawisza Bydgoszcz	2015–16	I liga	13	0	5	0	—		—		18	0
Jagiellonia Białystok	2016–17	Ekstraklasa	1	0	2	0	—		—		3	0
Jagiellonia Białystok	2017–18	Ekstraklasa	3	0	1	0	—		—		4	0
Jagiellonia Białystok	2019–20	Ekstraklasa	26	0	0	0	—		—		26	0
Jagiellonia Białystok	2020–21	Ekstraklasa	5	0	0	0	—		—		5	0
Jagiellonia Białystok	Total		35	0	3	0	0	0	0	0	38	0
Wigry Suwałki (loan)	2017–18	I liga	6	0	0	0	—		—		6	0
Wigry Suwałki (loan)	2018–19	I liga	29	0	0	0	—		—		29	0
Wigry Suwałki (loan)	Total		35	0	0	0	—		—		35	0
Wisła Płock	2021–22	Ekstraklasa	2	0	1	0	—		—		3	0
Chrobry Głogów (loan)	2022–23	I liga	12	0	2	0	—		—		14	0
Chrobry Głogów II (loan)	2022–23	III liga, gr. III	1	0	—		—		—		1	0
Chrobry Głogów	2023–24	I liga	33	0	0	0	—		—		33	0
Arka Gdynia	2024–25	I liga	25	0	0	0	—		—		25	0
Arka Gdynia	2025–26	Ekstraklasa	27	0	0	0	—		—		27	0
Arka Gdynia	Total		52	0	0	0	—		—		52	0
ŁKS Łódź	2026–27	I liga	0	0	0	0	—		—		0	0
Career total			183	0	11	0	0	0	0	0	194	0

== Honours ==
Arka Gdynia

- I liga: 2024–25
