= Przemysław Stolc =

Polish footballer (born 1994)

Personal information
- Date of birth: 3 July 1994 (age 32)
- Place of birth: Gdynia, Poland
- Height: 1.86 m (6 ft 1 in)
- Position: Defender

Team information
- Current team: Olimpia Grudziądz
- Number: 32

Youth career
- UKS Cisowa Gdynia
- 2010–2014: Arka Gdynia

Senior career*
Years	Team	Apps	(Gls)
2012–2017	Arka Gdynia II	72	(8)
2014–2018	Arka Gdynia	35	(1)
2017–2018	→ Chrobry Głogów (loan)	29	(3)
2018–2021	Chrobry Głogów	85	(1)
2021–2022	KKS 1925 Kalisz	25	(0)
2022–2026	Arka Gdynia	80	(4)
2026–	Olimpia Grudziądz	15	(0)
- * Club domestic league appearances and goals as of 16:12, 2 June 2026 (UTC)

Przemysław Stolc (born 3 July 1994) is a Polish professional footballer who plays as a defender for II liga club Olimpia Grudziądz.

== Career statistics ==
As of match played 2 June 2026

Appearances and goals by club, season and competition
Club	Season	League			Polish Cup		Europe		Other		Total	
Club	Season	Division	Apps	Goals	Apps	Goals	Apps	Goals	Apps	Goals	Apps	Goals
Arka Gdynia II	2011–12	IV liga Pomerania	1	0	—		—		—		1	0
Arka Gdynia II	2012–13	III liga, gr. D	11	0	—		—		—		11	0
Arka Gdynia II	2013–14	III liga, gr. D	26	2	—		—		—		26	2
Arka Gdynia II	2014–15	III liga, gr. D	15	1	—		—		—		15	1
Arka Gdynia II	2015–16	III liga, gr. D	7	1	—		—		—		7	1
Arka Gdynia II	2016–17	IV liga Pomerania	12	4	—		—		—		12	4
Arka Gdynia II	Total		72	8	—		—		—		72	8
Arka Gdynia	2014–15	I liga	14	0	—		—		—		14	0
Arka Gdynia	2015–16	I liga	15	1	1	0	—		—		16	1
Arka Gdynia	2016–17	Ekstraklasa	6	0	5	1	—		—		11	1
Arka Gdynia	Total		35	1	6	1	—		—		41	2
Chrobry Głogów (loan)	2017–18	I liga	29	3	5	0	—		—		34	3
Chrobry Głogów	2018–19	I liga	32	1	3	0	—		—		35	1
Chrobry Głogów	2019–20	I liga	30	0	1	0	—		—		31	0
Chrobry Głogów	2020–21	I liga	23	0	1	0	—		—		24	0
Chrobry Głogów	Total		114	4	10	0	—		—		124	4
KKS 1925 Kalisz	2021–22	II liga	25	0	1	0	—		—		26	0
Arka Gdynia	2022–23	I liga	29	1	1	0	—		—		30	1
Arka Gdynia	2023–24	I liga	32	3	3	1	—		2 (Note: Appearances in I liga promotion play-offs)	0	37	4
Arka Gdynia	2024–25	I liga	17	0	1	0	—		—		18	0
Arka Gdynia	2025–26	Ekstraklasa	0	0	0	0	—		—		0	0
Arka Gdynia	Total		78	4	5	1	—		2	0	85	5
Olimpia Grudziądz	2025–26	II liga	14	0	—		—		1 (Note: Appearance in II liga promotion play-offs)	0	15	0
Career total			338	17	22	2	0	0	3	0	363	19

== Honours ==
Arka Gdynia II

- IV liga Pomerania: 2011–12

Arka Gdynia

- I liga: 2024–25
- Polish Cup: 2016–17
