= Michał Marcjanik =

Polish footballer

Personal information
- Full name: Michał Piotr Marcjanik
- Date of birth: 15 December 1994 (age 31)
- Place of birth: Gdynia, Poland
- Height: 1.88 m (6 ft 2 in)
- Position: Centre back

Team information
- Current team: Polonia Warsaw
- Number: 29

Youth career
- –2012: Arka Gdynia

Senior career*
| Years | Team | Apps | (Gls) |
| 2012–2016 | Arka Gdynia II | 17 | (1) |
| 2013–2018 | Arka Gdynia | 120 | (8) |
| 2018–2020 | Empoli | 0 | (0) |
| 2019 | → Carpi (loan) | 0 | (0) |
| 2019–2020 | → Wisła Płock (loan) | 22 | (0) |
| 2020–2026 | Arka Gdynia | 183 | (23) |
| 2026– | Polonia Warsaw | 0 | (0) |

International career
| 2016–2017 | Poland U21 | 2 | (0) |
- * Club domestic league appearances and goals as of 17:50, 25 May 2026 (UTC)

Michał Piotr Marcjanik (born 15 December 1994) is a Polish professional footballer who plays as a centre-back for I liga club Polonia Warsaw.

== Club career ==
=== Empoli ===
==== Loan to Carpi ====
After joining Empoli in the summer of 2018, Marcjanik remained on the bench for every Serie A game in the first half of the season. On 31 January 2019, he joined Serie B club Carpi on loan until the end of the season.

==== Loan to Wisła Płock ====
On 1 July 2019, Marcjanik was loaned out to Wisła Płock for the 2019–20 season.

=== Return to Arka Gdynia ===
On 9 August 2020, he signed a three-year contract with Arka Gdynia.

=== Polonia Warsaw ===
After six years at Arka, Marcjanik moved to Polonia Warsaw in the second division on 20 June 2026, signing a two-year deal with a one-year option.

== Career statistics ==
As of match played 23 May 2026

Appearances and goals by club, season and competition
| Club | Season | League | | | National cup (Note: Includes Polish Cup) | | Europe | | Other | | Total | |
| Club | Season | Division | Apps | Goals | Apps | Goals | Apps | Goals | Apps | Goals | Apps | Goals |
|---|---|---|---|---|---|---|---|---|---|---|---|---|
| Arka Gdynia II | 2012–13 | III liga, gr. D | 5 | 0 | — | | — | | — | | 5 | 0 |
| Arka Gdynia II | 2013–14 | III liga, gr. D | 7 | 1 | — | | — | | — | | 7 | 1 |
| Arka Gdynia II | 2014–15 | III liga, gr. D | 3 | 0 | — | | — | | — | | 3 | 0 |
| Arka Gdynia II | 2015–16 | III liga, gr. D | 1 | 0 | — | | — | | — | | 1 | 0 |
| Arka Gdynia II | 2016–17 | IV liga Pomerania | 1 | 0 | — | | — | | — | | 1 | 0 |
| Arka Gdynia II | Total | | 17 | 1 | — | | — | | — | | 17 | 1 |
| Arka Gdynia | 2013–14 | I liga | 4 | 0 | 2 | 0 | — | | — | | 6 | 0 |
| Arka Gdynia | 2014–15 | I liga | 24 | 2 | 1 | 0 | — | | — | | 25 | 2 |
| Arka Gdynia | 2015–16 | I liga | 27 | 2 | 2 | 0 | — | | — | | 29 | 2 |
| Arka Gdynia | 2016–17 | Ekstraklasa | 30 | 2 | 5 | 0 | — | | — | | 35 | 2 |
| Arka Gdynia | 2017–18 | Ekstraklasa | 35 | 2 | 4 | 0 | 2 (Note: Appearances in UEFA Europa League) | 0 | 1 (Note: Appearance in Polish Super Cup) | 0 | 42 | 2 |
| Arka Gdynia | Total | | 120 | 8 | 14 | 0 | 2 | 0 | 1 | 0 | 137 | 8 |
| Empoli | 2018–19 | Serie A | 0 | 0 | 0 | 0 | — | | — | | 0 | 0 |
| Carpi (loan) | 2018–19 | Serie B | 0 | 0 | — | | — | | — | | 0 | 0 |
| Wisła Płock (loan) | 2019–20 | Ekstraklasa | 22 | 0 | 2 | 0 | — | | — | | 24 | 0 |
| Arka Gdynia | 2020–21 | I liga | 25 | 3 | 6 | 1 | — | | 1 (Note: Appearance(s) in I liga promotion play-offs) | 0 | 32 | 4 |
| Arka Gdynia | 2021–22 | I liga | 32 | 6 | 2 | 0 | — | | 1 | 0 | 35 | 6 |
| Arka Gdynia | 2022–23 | I liga | 28 | 1 | 1 | 0 | — | | — | | 29 | 1 |
| Arka Gdynia | 2023–24 | I liga | 32 | 5 | 3 | 0 | — | | 2 | 0 | 37 | 5 |
| Arka Gdynia | 2024–25 | I liga | 29 | 6 | 2 | 0 | — | | — | | 31 | 6 |
| Arka Gdynia | 2025–26 | Ekstraklasa | 33 | 2 | 2 | 0 | — | | — | | 35 | 2 |
| Arka Gdynia | Total | | 179 | 23 | 16 | 1 | — | | 4 | 0 | 199 | 24 |
| Polonia Warsaw | 2026–27 | I liga | 0 | 0 | 0 | 0 | — | | — | | 0 | 0 |
| Career total | | | 338 | 32 | 32 | 1 | 2 | 0 | 5 | 0 | 377 | 33 |

== Honours ==
Arka Gdynia

- I liga: 2024–25
- Polish Cup: 2016–17
- Polish Super Cup: 2017

Individual

- Polish Union of Footballers' I liga Team of the Season: 2023–24
