= Dawid Gojny =

Polish footballer (born 1994)

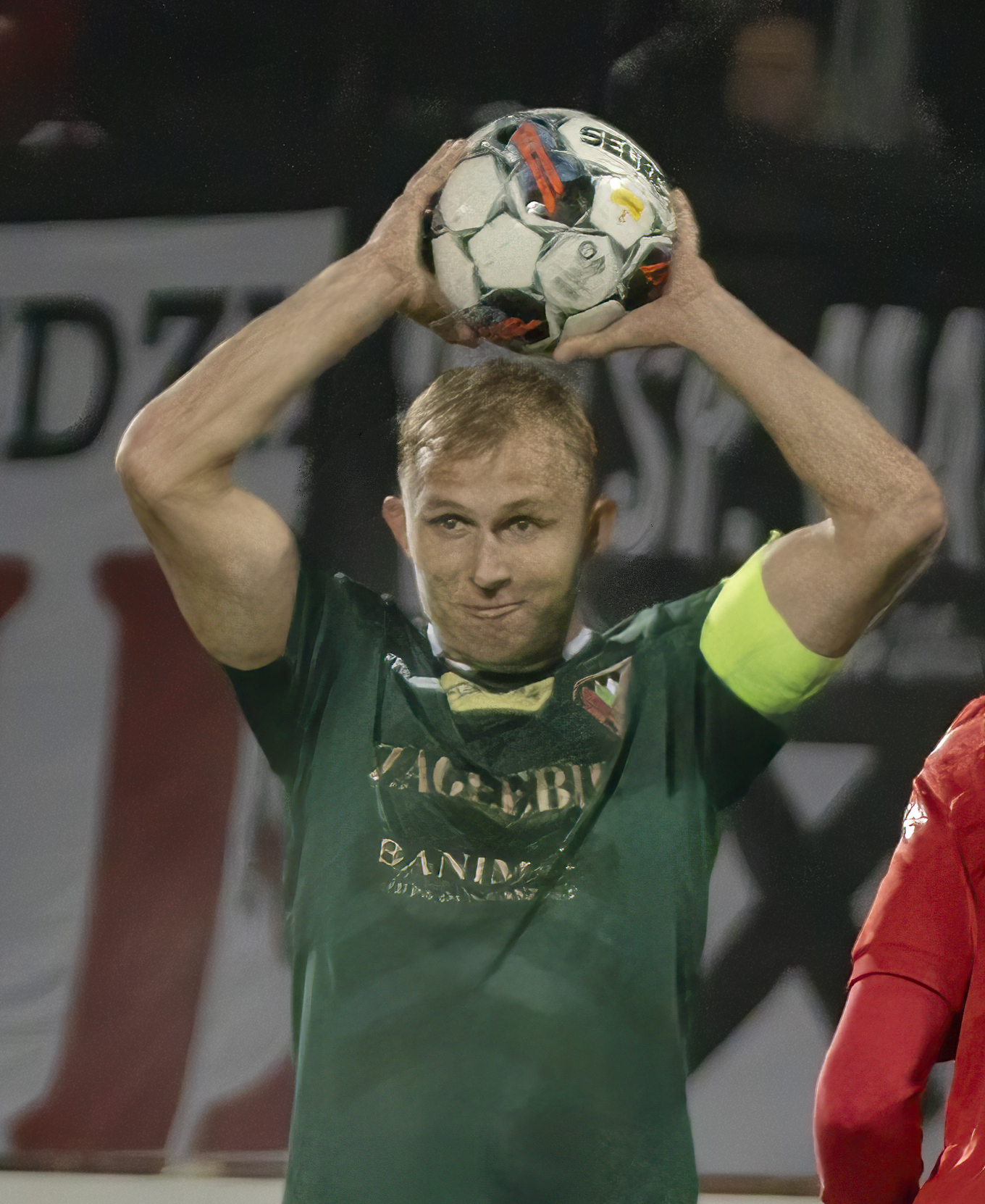
- Gojny in 2022 with Zagłębie Sosnowiec

Personal information
- Date of birth: 31 August 1994 (age 32)
- Place of birth: Wodzisław Śląski, Poland
- Height: 1.78 m (5 ft 10 in)
- Position: Left-back

Team information
- Current team: Arka Gdynia
- Number: 94

Youth career
- 2008–2009: Odra Wodzisław Śląski
- 2010–2011: Gosław-WAP Wodzisław Śląski
- 2011–2012: LKS Krzyżanowice
- 2012: Górnik Zabrze

Senior career*
Years	Team	Apps	(Gls)
2012	LKS Krzyżanowice		
2013–2014	Odra Wodzisław Śląski	36	(0)
2014–2018	ROW Rybnik	127	(2)
2018–2020	GKS Jastrzębie	63	(3)
2020–2023	Zagłębie Sosnowiec	75	(0)
2023–	Arka Gdynia	101	(3)
- * Club domestic league appearances and goals as of 17:27, 25 May 2026 (UTC)

Dawid Gojny (born 31 August 1994) is a Polish professional footballer who plays as a left-back for and captains I liga club Arka Gdynia.

== Career ==
Gojny began his youth career with his hometown club Odra Wodzisław Śląski, later playing for Gosław-WAP Wodzisław Śląski and LKS Krzyżanowice. He spent time in the Górnik Zabrze's Youth Ekstraklasa team before returning to Krzyżanowice.

In 2013, he rejoined Odra as a senior player, where he played until 2014, suffering a serious injury in March 2013. After recovering, he moved to fierce rivals Energetyk ROW Rybnik as a 19 year old, which later became ROW 1964 Rybnik. In 2018, after 133 appearances and two goals, he moved to GKS 1962 Jastrzębie.

In 2020, after making 65 appearances and scoring three goals, Gojny left GKS after deciding not to renew his contract and let it expire at the end of the season. He then signed with Zagłębie Sosnowiec on a free transfer on a two-year contract, stating his commitment to the team by saying he would "chew the grass" for the club. He was Zagłębie's captain.

In January 2023, Gojny joined Arka Gdynia from Zagłębie Sosnowiec on a permanent transfer, for an undisclosed fee believed to be approx. 300,000 PLN.

== Career statistics ==
As of match played 23 May 2026

Appearances and goals by club, season and competition
Club	Season	League			Polish Cup		Europe		Other		Total	
Club	Season	Division	Apps	Goals	Apps	Goals	Apps	Goals	Apps	Goals	Apps	Goals
Odra Wodzisław Śląski	2012–13	III liga, gr. F	14	0	—		—		—		14	0
Odra Wodzisław Śląski	2013–14	III liga, gr. F	22	0	—		—		—		22	0
Odra Wodzisław Śląski	Total		36	0	—		—		—		36	0
ROW 1964 Rybnik	2014–15	II liga	33	0	2	0	—		—		35	0
ROW 1964 Rybnik	2015–16	II liga	32	0	2	0	—		—		34	0
ROW 1964 Rybnik	2016–17	II liga	33	0	0	0	—		—		33	0
ROW 1964 Rybnik	2017–18	II liga	29	2	2	0	—		—		31	2
ROW 1964 Rybnik	Total		127	2	6	0	—		—		133	2
GKS 1962 Jastrzębie	2018–19	I liga	33	2	1	0	—		—		34	2
GKS 1962 Jastrzębie	2019–20	I liga	30	1	1	0	—		—		31	1
GKS 1962 Jastrzębie	Total		63	3	2	0	—		—		65	3
Zagłębie Sosnowiec	2020–21	I liga	32	0	1	0	—		—		33	0
Zagłębie Sosnowiec	2021–22	I liga	27	0	2	0	—		—		29	0
Zagłębie Sosnowiec	2022–23	I liga	16	0	2	0	—		—		18	0
Zagłębie Sosnowiec	Total		75	0	5	0	—		—		80	0
Arka Gdynia	2022–23	I liga	15	1	—		—		—		15	1
Arka Gdynia	2023–24	I liga	30	0	3	0	—		0	0	33	0
Arka Gdynia	2024–25	I liga	34	1	2	0	—		—		36	1
Arka Gdynia	2025–26	Ekstraklasa	22	1	1	0	—		—		23	1
Arka Gdynia	Total		101	3	6	0	—		0	0	107	3
Career total			402	8	19	0	0	0	0	0	421	8

== Honours ==
Arka Gdynia

- I liga: 2024–25
