= Grobelny =

Grobelny (feminine: Grobelna) is a Polish surname. Notable people with the surname include:

- Igor Grobelny (born 1993), Belgian-Polish volleyball player
- Jędrzej Grobelny (born 2001), Polish footballer
- Julian Grobelny (1893–1946), Polish activist
- Kaja Grobelna (born 1995), Belgian-Polish volleyball player
- Ryszard Grobelny (born 1963), Polish politician
