= Alassane Sidibe =

Ivorian footballer

Personal information
- Date of birth: 9 June 2002 (age 24)
- Place of birth: Abidjan, Côte d'Ivoire
- Height: 1.80 m (5 ft 11 in)
- Position: Midfielder

Team information
- Current team: Arka Gdynia
- Number: 8

Youth career
- Collelongo
- –2017: Capistrello
- 2017–2022: Atalanta

Senior career*
Years	Team	Apps	(Gls)
2022–2024	Atalanta	1	(0)
2022–2023	→ Cosenza (loan)	1	(0)
2023	→ Ascoli (loan)	1	(0)
2023–2024	Atalanta U23	14	(0)
2024	→ Arka Gdynia (loan)	15	(3)
2024–	Arka Gdynia	43	(1)
- * Club domestic league appearances and goals as of 17:34, 25 May 2026 (UTC)

Alassane Sidibe (born 9 June 2002) is an Ivorian professional footballer who plays as midfielder for I liga club Arka Gdynia.

== Career ==
Sidibe started playing football at Collelongo and at Capistrello. In 2017, he moved to Atalanta. Sidibe scored ten goals in the 2019–20 season with the under-18s team. In the following season, he scored ten goals in 28 appearances with the under-19s. On 22 January 2022, Sidibe debuted with the first team in a 0–0 draw against Lazio.

On 30 August 2022, Sidibe joined Cosenza on a season-long loan. On 31 January 2023, he moved on a new loan to Ascoli.

On 11 February 2024, Sidibe moved on loan to Arka Gdynia in Poland. He left the club at the conclusion of the season, before re-joining them on a three-year deal on 3 September 2024.

== Career statistics ==
As of match played 23 May 2026

Appearances and goals by club, season and competition
Club	Season	League			National cup (Note: Includes Polish Cup)		Europe		Other		Total	
Club	Season	Division	Apps	Goals	Apps	Goals	Apps	Goals	Apps	Goals	Apps	Goals
Atalanta	2021–22	Serie A	1	0	0	0	0	0	—		1	0
Cosenza (loan)	2022–23	Serie B	1	0	—		—		—		1	0
Ascoli (loan)	2022–23	Serie B	1	0	—		—		—		1	0
Atalanta U23	2023–24	Serie C Group A	14	0	—		—		1 (Note: Appearance in Coppa Italia Serie C)	0	15	0
Arka Gdynia (loan)	2023–24	I liga	13	3	—		—		2 (Note: Appearances in I liga promotion play-offs)	0	15	3
Arka Gdynia	2024–25	I liga	22	1	2	0	—		—		24	1
Arka Gdynia	2025–26	Ekstraklasa	21	0	2	0	—		—		23	0
Arka Gdynia	Total		56	4	4	0	—		2	0	62	4
Career total			73	4	4	0	0	0	3	0	80	4

== Honours ==
Arka Gdynia

- I liga: 2024–25
