= Oliwier Wojciechowski =

Polish footballer (born 2005)

Personal information
- Full name: Oliwier Wojciechowski
- Date of birth: 5 April 2005 (age 21)
- Place of birth: Poland
- Height: 1.72 m (5 ft 8 in)
- Position: Midfielder

Team information
- Current team: Polonia Warsaw
- Number: 8

Youth career
- Ruch Wysokie Mazowieckie
- –2020: Jagiellonia Białystok

Senior career*
Years	Team	Apps	(Gls)
2020–2023	Jagiellonia Białystok II	33	(3)
2021–2024	Jagiellonia Białystok	13	(0)
2023–2024	→ Polonia Warsaw (loan)	12	(0)
2024–	Polonia Warsaw	58	(3)

International career^{‡}
2018	Poland U14	1	(0)
2019	Poland U15	2	(0)
2021	Poland U17	6	(0)
2022	Poland U18	3	(0)
2024–2025	Poland U20	5	(0)
- * Club domestic league appearances and goals as of 15:36, 29 May 2026 (UTC) ‡ National team caps and goals as of 25 March 2025

Oliwier Wojciechowski (born 5 April 2005) is a Polish professional footballer who plays as a midfielder for I liga club Polonia Warsaw.

== Career statistics ==
As of match played 28 May 2026

Appearances and goals by club, season and competition
Club	Season	League			Polish Cup		Europe		Other		Total	
Club	Season	Division	Apps	Goals	Apps	Goals	Apps	Goals	Apps	Goals	Apps	Goals
Jagiellonia Białystok II	2020–21	III liga, gr. I	4	0	—		—		—		4	0
Jagiellonia Białystok II	2021–22	III liga, gr. I	15	1	—		—		—		15	1
Jagiellonia Białystok II	2022–23	III liga, gr. I	14	2	—		—		—		14	2
Jagiellonia Białystok II	Total		33	3	—		—		—		33	3
Jagiellonia Białystok	2021–22	Ekstraklasa	6	0	0	0	—		—		6	0
Jagiellonia Białystok	2022–23	Ekstraklasa	7	0	2	0	—		—		9	0
Jagiellonia Białystok	Total		13	0	2	0	—		—		15	0
Polonia Warsaw (loan)	2023–24	I liga	12	0	3	0	—		—		15	0
Polonia Warsaw	2024–25	I liga	30	1	4	0	—		1 (Note: Appearance in I liga promotion play-offs)	0	35	1
Polonia Warsaw	2025–26	I liga	26	2	0	0	—		1	0	27	2
Polonia Warsaw	Total		68	3	7	0	—		2	0	77	3
Career total			114	6	9	0	0	0	2	0	125	6
