= Adam Ratajczyk =

Polish footballer

Personal information
- Date of birth: 12 June 2002 (age 24)
- Place of birth: Warsaw, Poland
- Height: 1.76 m (5 ft 9 in)
- Position: Left midfielder

Team information
- Current team: Znicz Pruszków (on loan from Widzew Łódź II)
- Number: 77

Youth career
- 2011–2018: Znicz Pruszków

Senior career*
Years	Team	Apps	(Gls)
2018–2020	ŁKS Łódź	24	(1)
2020–2024	Zagłębie Lubin	28	(0)
2021–2024	Zagłębie Lubin II	23	(3)
2022–2023	→ Stal Mielec (loan)	16	(1)
2024–2026	Arka Gdynia	18	(1)
2026–	Widzew Łódź II	21	(5)
2026–	→ Znicz Pruszków (loan)	0	(0)

International career
2020	Poland U19	2	(0)
2022	Poland U21	2	(0)
- * Club domestic league appearances and goals as of 21:57, 1 June 2026 (UTC)

Adam Ratajczyk (born 12 June 2002) is a Polish professional footballer who plays as a left midfielder for II liga club Znicz Pruszków, on loan from Widzew Łódź II.

== Club career ==
On 2 October 2020, he signed a four-year contract with Zagłębie Lubin.

On 2 September 2022, Ratajczyk joined another Ekstraklasa club Stal Mielec on a season-long loan.

Having spent the 2023–24 campaign playing for Zagłębie's reserve team, Ratajczyk moved to I liga club Arka Gdynia after signing a two-year deal on 18 June 2024.

After terminating his contract with Arka, Ratajczyk joined Widzew Łódź's reserve team on 25 February 2026, signing a two-and-a-half-year deal. On 1 September 2026, he moved on loan to third tier side Znicz Pruszków for the 2026–27 season.

== Career statistics ==
As of match played 2 September 2026

Appearances and goals by club, season and competition
Club	Season	League			Polish Cup		Europe		Other		Total	
Club	Season	Division	Apps	Goals	Apps	Goals	Apps	Goals	Apps	Goals	Apps	Goals
ŁKS Łódź	2018–19	I liga	2	0	—		—		—		2	0
ŁKS Łódź	2019–20	Ekstraklasa	18	1	2	0	—		—		20	1
ŁKS Łódź	2020–21	I liga	4	0	1	0	—		—		5	0
ŁKS Łódź	Total		24	1	3	0	—		—		27	1
Zagłębie Lubin	2020–21	Ekstraklasa	14	0	0	0	—		—		14	0
Zagłębie Lubin	2021–22	Ekstraklasa	11	0	2	1	—		—		13	1
Zagłębie Lubin	2022–23	Ekstraklasa	3	0	1	0	—		—		4	0
Zagłębie Lubin	Total		28	0	3	1	—		—		31	1
Zagłębie Lubin II	2020–21	III liga, gr. III	5	1	—		—		—		5	1
Zagłębie Lubin II	2021–22	III liga, gr. III	6	1	—		—		—		6	1
Zagłębie Lubin II	2022–23	II liga	4	1	—		—		—		4	1
Zagłębie Lubin II	2023–24	II liga	8	0	1	0	—		—		9	0
Zagłębie Lubin II	Total		23	3	1	0	—		—		24	3
Stal Mielec (loan)	2022–23	Ekstraklasa	16	1	—		—		—		16	1
Arka Gdynia	2024–25	I liga	18	1	1	0	—		—		19	1
Arka Gdynia	2025–26	Ekstraklasa	0	0	0	0	—		—		0	0
Arka Gdynia	Total		18	1	1	0	—		—		19	1
Widzew Łódź II	2025–26	III liga, gr. I	16	3	—		—		—		16	3
Widzew Łódź II	2026–27	III liga, gr. I	5	2	—		—		—		5	2
Widzew Łódź II	Total		21	5	—		—		—		21	5
Znicz Pruszków (loan)	2026–27	II liga	0	0	1	0	—		—		1	0
Career total			130	11	9	1	0	0	0	0	139	12

== Honours ==
ŁKS Łódź II

- Regional league Łódź: 2018–19

Zagłębie Lubin II

- III liga, group III: 2021–22

Arka Gdynia

- I liga: 2024–25

Widzew Łódź II

- Polish Cup (Łódź regionals): 2025–26
