= 2024–25 Arka Gdynia season =

Arka Gdynia
2024–25 season
- Owner: Marcin Gruchała (92%)
- Chairman: Marcin Gruchała (until 31 January); Wojciech Pertkiewicz (from 1 February)
- Manager: Wojciech Łobodziński (until 26 August); Tomasz Grzegorczyk (interim; 26 August – 11 December); Dawid Szwarga (from 12 December)
- Stadium: Gdynia Stadium
- I liga: 1st (promoted)
- Polish Cup: Round of 32
- Top goalscorer: League: Karol Czubak (14); All: Karol Czubak (15)
- Biggest win: Odra Opole 0–6 Arka Gdynia (6 October 2024)
- Biggest defeat: Arka Gdynia 1–3 (a.e.t.) Piast Gliwice (30 October 2024)
Home colours	Away colours	Third colours

The 2024–25 season was the 96th season in the history of Arka Gdynia, and the club's fifth consecutive season in I liga. In addition to the domestic league, the team participated in the Polish Cup.

== Players ==
=== Current squad ===
As of 24 March 2025

Note: Flags indicate national team as defined under FIFA eligibility rules; some limited exceptions apply. Players may hold more than one non-FIFA nationality.

No.	Pos.	Nation	Player
1	GK	POL	Jędrzej Grobelny
2	DF	ESP	Marc Navarro
4	DF	SVK	Martin Dobrotka
6	DF	POL	Kasjan Lipkowski
7	FW	POL	Szymon Sobczak
8	MF	CIV	Alassane Sidibe
9	MF	GEO	Tornike Gaprindashvili
11	MF	POL	Dawid Kocyła
13	DF	UKR	Oleksandr Azatskyi
14	MF	JPN	Hide Vitalucci
16	MF	POL	Adam Ratajczyk
18	DF	FRA	Julien Célestine
19	MF	POL	Michał Rzuchowski
21	MF	POL	Kacper Skóra
23	DF	ESP	Kike Hermoso

No.	Pos.	Nation	Player
27	MF	SUI	João Oliveira
29	DF	POL	Michał Marcjanik
30	GK	POL	Konrad Krzebietke
31	MF	POL	Jakub Staniszewski
32	DF	POL	Przemysław Stolc
33	GK	POL	Paweł Depka
34	FW	POL	Wiktor Sawicki
35	MF	POL	Kamil Jakubczyk
36	FW	POL	Adrian Jurkiewicz
39	MF	POL	Filip Kocaba (on loan from Zagłębie Lubin)
77	GK	POL	Damian Węglarz
80	MF	BIH	Zvonimir Petrović
94	DF	POL	Dawid Gojny (captain)
99	FW	POL	Jordan Majchrzak (on loan from Legia Warsaw)

== Transfers ==
=== In ===
Pos.	Player	Transferred from	Fee	Date	Source
FW	(Poland) Kamil Jakubczyk	(Poland) Pogon Szczecin II	Undisclosed	3 July 2024	
MF	(Georgia (country)) Tornike Gaprindashvili	(Poland) Zagłębie Lubin	Undisclosed	3 July 2024	
MF	(Poland) Michał Rzuchowski	(Poland) Śląsk Wrocław	Free	6 July 2024	
MF	(Japan) Hide Vitalucci	(Poland) Chojniczanka Chojnice	PLN 300,000	6 July 2024	

=== Out ===
Pos.	Player	Transferred to	Fee	Date	Source
MF	(Poland) Olaf Kobacki	(England) Sheffield Wednesday	Undisclosed	3 July 2024	
FW	(Poland) Marcel Szymański	(Poland) KKS 1925 Kalisz	Loan	3 July 2024	

== Friendlies ==
29 June 2024 Friendly	Arka Gdynia (Poland)	5–2	(Northern Ireland) Linfield Belfast	Gniewino
14:00 UTC+2	Czubak 10'; Sobczak 47', 90'; Skóra 59'; Gojny 71'	Report	McGee 42'; McKee 45'	Stadium: Stadion GOTiS

7 July 2024 Friendly	Viborg FF (Denmark)	2–0	(Poland) Arka Gdynia	Vildbjerg, Denmark
13:00 UTC+2	Vester 10'; Berger 90+3'	Report		Stadium: Vildbjerg Sports and Culture Center

10 July 2024 Friendly	Randers (Denmark)	2–1	(Poland) Arka Gdynia	Randers, Denmark
17:00 UTC+2	Isah 26'; Danho 77'	Report	Sobczak 15'	Stadium: Randers Stadium

13 July 2024 Friendly	Arka Gdynia (Poland)	2–2	(Poland) Olimpia Grudziądz	Gdynia
17:00	Borecki 60'; McKee 82'	Report	Tsyupa 10'; Kaczmarek 58' (pen.)	Stadium: Gdynia Stadium; Attendance: 800

30 July 2024 Friendly	Arka Gdynia (Poland)	1–0	(Cyprus) AEL Limassol
11:00	Skóra 13'

15 November 2024 Friendly	Pogoń Szczecin (Poland)	1–1	(Poland) Arka Gdynia	Szczecin
11:00 CET	Olaf Korczakowski 62'; Klukowski (yellow card) 75'; Lisowski (yellow card) 86'	Report	Ratajczyk 57'	Stadium: Stadion Miejski im. Floriana Krygiera

25 January 2025 Friendly	Warta Poznań (Poland)	0–1	(Poland) Arka Gdynia	Władysławowo
11:00 CET		Report	Vitalucci 87'	Stadium: Stadion Lekkoatletyczny COS OPO Cetniewo

31 January 2025 Friendly	Lokomotiv Plovdiv (Bulgaria)	0–2	(Poland) Arka Gdynia	Belek
14:00 CET		Report	Sobczak 19'; Gaprindashvili 36'	Stadium: Fanatic Tour Belek Sport Center

1 February 2025 Friendly	Arka Gdynia (Poland)	0–0	(North Macedonia) Makedonija	Manavgat
13:00 CET		Report		Stadium: Hane Hotels Football Center

5 February 2025 Friendly	Polissya (Ukraine)	2–3	(Poland) Arka Gdynia
10:15 CET	Sarapiy 45+3'; Yaroslav Karaman 54'; Paixão (red card) 60'	Report	Sobczak 4'; Oliveira 48'; Oleksii Avramenko 74' (o.g.)

5 February 2025 Friendly	Arka Gdynia (Poland)	2–0	(Bosnia and Herzegovina) Sloga Meridian
16:00 CET	Stolc 48'; Ratajczyk 81'	Report

== Competitions ==
=== Overall record ===
Competition	First match	Last match	Starting round	Final position	Record							
Competition	First match	Last match	Starting round	Final position	Pld	W	D	L	GF	GA	GD	Win %
I liga	22 July 2024	25–26 May 2025	Matchday 1	Winners	34	21	9	4	63	24	+39	61.76
Polish Cup	24 September 2024	30 October 2024	First round		2	0	1	1	3	5	−2	0.00
Total					36	21	10	5	66	29	+37	58.33

Source: Soccerway

=== I liga ===
==== League table ====
Pos	Team	Pld	W	D	L	GF	GA	GD	Pts	Promotion or Relegation
1	Arka Gdynia (C, P)	34	21	9	4	63	24	+39	72	Promotion to Ekstraklasa
2	Bruk-Bet Termalica Nieciecza (P)	34	21	8	5	70	39	+31	71	Promotion to Ekstraklasa
3	Wisła Płock (O, P)	34	18	10	6	58	38	+20	64	Qualification for the promotion play-offs
4	Wisła Kraków	34	18	8	8	63	32	+31	62	Qualification for the promotion play-offs
5	Miedź Legnica	34	16	8	10	56	45	+11	56 (Note: Ranked based on goal difference: Miedź Legnica +11, Polonia Warsaw +9.)	Qualification for the promotion play-offs

Source: 1liga.org, 90minut.pl
Rules for classification: 1) Points; 2) Head-to-head points; 3) Head-to-head goal difference; 4) Goal difference; 6) Goals scored; 7) Number of wins; 8) Number of away wins.
(Note: Head-to-head record is used only after all the matches between the teams in question have been played)
(C) Champions; (O) Play-off winner; (P) Promoted
Notes:

Semi-finals; 29 May 2025
3	Wisła Płock	2
6	Polonia Warsaw	1
4	Wisła Kraków	0
5	Miedź Legnica	1

Final; 1 June 2025
3	Wisła Płock	2
5	Miedź Legnica	0

==== Results summary ====
Overall								Home						Away					
Pld	W	D	L	GF	GA	GD	Pts	W	D	L	GF	GA	GD	W	D	L	GF	GA	GD
28	18	7	3	54	19	+35	61	9	4	1	30	10	+20	9	3	2	24	9	+15

Last updated: 12 April 2025.

==== Results by round ====
Round	1	2	3	4	5	6	7	8	9	10	11	12	13	14	15	16	17	18	19	20	21	22	23	24	25	26	27	28	29	30	31	32	33	34
Ground	A	H	A	H	A	H	H	A	H	A	H	A	H	A	H	A	H	H	A	H	A	H	A	A	H	A	H	A	H	A	H	A	H	A
Result	L	W	W	D	D	D	L	W	W	W	W	W	W	L	W	D	W	W	W	D	W	D	W	W	W	W	W	D						
Position	14	9	6	6	6	7	9	7	7	5	4	3	3	4	3	3	3	2	2	2	2	2	1	1	1	1	1	1						

Updated to match(es) played on 12 April 2025. Source: worldfootball
A = Away; H = Home; W = Win; D = Draw; L = Loss

==== Matches ====
The match schedule was released on 12 June 2024.

22 July 2024 1	Stal Rzeszów	1–0	Arka Gdynia	Rzeszów
19:00 UTC+2	Díaz 82'		Borecki (yellow card) 58'; Marcjanik (yellow card) 86'	Stadium: Stal Rzeszów Municipal Stadium; Referee: Sebastian Jarzębak

29 July 2024 2	Arka Gdynia	2–1	ŁKS Łódź	Gdynia
20:30 UTC+2	Marcjanik 7'; Skóra 88'		Louveau 45+2'	Stadium: Gdynia Stadium; Referee: Marcin Szczerbowicz

3 August 2024 3	Polonia Warsaw	0–3	Arka Gdynia	Warsaw
19:35			Sobczak 18'; Vitalucci 70'; Czubak 90+1'	Stadium: Kazimierz Sosnkowski Stadium; Referee: Wojciech Myć

9 August 2024 4	Arka Gdynia	1–1	Znicz Pruszków	Gdynia
20:30 UTC+2	Oliveira 14'		Nowak 12'	Stadium: Gdynia Stadium; Attendance: 4,997; Referee: Patryk Gryckiewicz

19 August 2024 5	Wisła Kraków	2–2	Arka Gdynia	Kraków
19:00				Stadium: Henryk Reyman Municipal Stadium

22 August 2024 6	Arka Gdynia	1–1	Ruch Chorzów	Gdynia
19:00 UTC+2				Stadium: Gdynia Stadium

25 August 2024 7	Arka Gdynia	1–2	Górnik Łęczna	Gdynia
17:00 UTC+2				Stadium: Gdynia Stadium

30 August 2024 8	Miedź Legnica	1–2	Arka Gdynia	Legnica
20:30				Stadium: White Eagle Municipal Stadium

15 September 2024 9	Arka Gdynia	5–0	Kotwica Kołobrzeg	Gdynia
14:30 UTC+2				Stadium: Gdynia Stadium

21 September 2024 10	Warta Poznań	0–1	Arka Gdynia	Poznań
14:30				Stadium: Warta Poznań Stadium

29 September 2024 11	Arka Gdynia	2–0	Chrobry Głogów	Gdynia
12:00 UTC+2				Stadium: Gdynia Stadium

6 October 2024 12	Odra Opole	0–6	Arka Gdynia	Opole
14:30				Stadium: Odra Municipal Stadium

20 October 2024 13	Arka Gdynia	2–1	Pogoń Siedlce	Gdynia
14:30 CET	Gojny 10'; Sobczak 23' (yellow card) 90+7'; Kacper Skóra (yellow card) 87'	Report	Cássio (yellow card) 62'; Karol Podliński 73' (pen.)	Stadium: Gdynia Stadium; Attendance: 7,420; Referee: (Poland) Tomasz Marciniak

26 October 2024 14	Nieciecza	2–1	Arka Gdynia	Nieciecza
19:30 CET	Spendlhofer 7'; Ambrosiewicz (yellow card) 14'; Kacper Karasek 82'	Report	Oliveira (yellow card) 14'; Marcjanik 57'	Stadium: Stadion Sportowy Bruk-Bet Termalica; Attendance: 2,184; Referee: (Poland) Paweł Malec

2 November 2024 15	Arka Gdynia	2–0	Wisła Płock	Gdynia
19:30 CET	Sobczak (yellow card) 24' (goal) 55' (pen.); Gojny (yellow card) 26'; Filip Kocaba (yellow card) 82'; Vitalucci 87'	Report	Oskar Tomczyk (yellow card) 21'; Sekulski (yellow card) 34'; Krawczyk (yellow card) 39'; Szymański (red card) 77'	Stadium: Gdynia Stadium; Referee: (Poland) Marcin Szczerbowicz

9 November 2024 16	Tychy	1–1	Arka Gdynia	Tychy
14:30 CET	Budnicki 18' (yellow card) 90+2'; Bieroński (yellow card) 37'	Report	Kike Hermoso (yellow card) 5'; Czubak 28'; Gaprindashvili (yellow card) 56'; Oliveira (yellow card) 74'	Stadium: Stadion Miejski; Attendance: 3,070; Referee: (Poland) Sylwester Rasmus

24 November 2024 17	Arka Gdynia	5–1	Stal Stalowa Wola	Gdynia
17:00 CET	Filip Kocaba 36'; Czubak 43' (pen.) 59' 78'; Vitalucci 48'	Report	Strózik 22'; Oko (yellow card) 35'; Zaucha (yellow card) 82'; Michał Mydlarz (red card) 82'; Jakub Górski (yellow card) 90+6'	Stadium: Gdynia Stadium; Referee: (Poland) Piotr Rzucidło

2 December 2024 18	Arka Gdynia	2–1	Stal Rzeszów	Gdynia
19:00 CET	Czubak 19'; Gaprindashvili 23'; Stolc (yellow card) 63'	Report	Benedykt Piotrowski (yellow card) 36'; Kościelny 62'; Marcin Kaczor (yellow card) 87'	Stadium: Gdynia Stadium; Attendance: 4,518; Referee: (Poland) Piotr Urban

9 December 2024 19	ŁKS Łódź	0–2	Arka Gdynia	Łódź
19:00 CET	Piotr Głowacki (yellow card) 34'; Aleksander Iwańczyk (yellow card) 78' (red card) 88'	Report	Marcjanik 82'; Gojny (yellow card) 85'; Vitalucci (yellow card) 86'; Sobczak 90+4' (yellow card) 90+5'	Stadium: Stadion Miejski ŁKS Łódź; Attendance: 4,832; Referee: (Poland) Paweł Raczkowski

14 February 2025 20	Arka Gdynia	0–0	Polonia Warsaw	Gdynia
20:45 CET	Filip Kocaba (yellow card) 73'; Marc Navarro (yellow card) 80'	Report	Przemysław Szur (yellow card) 33'	Stadium: Gdynia Stadium; Attendance: 5,370; Referee: (Poland) Grzegorz Kawałko

22 February 2025 21	Znicz Pruszków	0–1	Arka Gdynia	Pruszków
19:30 CET	Wiktor Nowak (yellow card) 32'; Moskwik (yellow card) 68'	Report	Gojny (yellow card) 20'; Oliveira 22'; Marc Navarro (yellow card) 39'; Majchrzak (yellow card) 90+5'	Stadium: Stadion Znicza Pruszków; Referee: (Poland) Paweł Malec

28 February 2025 22	Arka Gdynia	2–2	Wisła Kraków	Gdynia
20:30 CET	Sobczak 8'; Filip Kocaba (yellow card) 43'; Zvonimir Petrović (yellow card) 45+1'; Marcjanik (yellow card) 52'; Azatskyi 53'; Marc Navarro (yellow card) 65'; Węglarz (yellow card) 68'; Majchrzak (yellow card) 70'; Gaprindashvili (yellow card) 90+9'	Report	Ángel Rodado 28'; Rafał Mikulec (yellow card) 68'; Sukiennicki (yellow card) 90+3'; Frederico Duarte 90+5'	Stadium: Gdynia Stadium; Attendance: 8,015; Referee: (Poland) Paweł Raczkowski

8 March 2025 23	Ruch Chorzów	0–1	Arka Gdynia	Chorzów
19:30 CET	Konczkowski (yellow card) 7'; Szymon Karasiński (yellow card) 19'	Report	Marcjanik (yellow card) 32' (goal) 77'; Sidibe (yellow card) 74'	Stadium: Ruch Chorzów Stadium; Attendance: 12,408; Referee: (Poland) Marcin Kochanek

16 March 2025 24	Górnik Łęczna	0–1	Arka Gdynia	Łęczna
14:30 CET	David Ogaga (yellow card) 61' (yellow-red card) 65'; Kryeziu (yellow card) 90'	Report	Sobczak 6' (pen.); Vitalucci (red card) 20'; Célestine (red card) 77'	Stadium: Łęczna Stadium; Referee: (Poland) Mateusz Piszczelok

30 March 2025 25	Arka Gdynia	2–0	Miedź Legnica	Gdynia
14:30 CET	Kike Hermoso 50'; Filip Kocaba (yellow card) 80'; Sidibe 82'	Report	Kovačević (yellow card) 89'	Stadium: Gdynia Stadium; Attendance: 10,864; Referee: (Poland) Paweł Malec

4 April 2025 26	Kotwica Kołobrzeg	0–1	Arka Gdynia	Kołobrzeg
20:30 CET	Filipe Oliveira (yellow card) 25'; Musolitin (yellow card) 78'	Report	Sidibe (yellow card) 49'; Marc Navarro 90+2'	Stadium: Stadion Miejski; Attendance: 1,800; Referee: (Poland) Tomasz Marciniak

=== Polish Cup ===
25 September 2024 First round	Stal Stalowa Wola	2–2 (a.e.t.) (2–3 p)	Arka Gdynia	Stalowa Wola
19:00 CEST (UTC+02:00)	Švec 15'; Tavares 116'	Report	Czubak 80'; Navarro 109'	Stadium: Subcarpathian Football Center; Attendance: 1,950; Referee: Jacek Małyszek (Lublin)
	Penalties
	Kukułowicz (penalty missed); Soszyński (penalty missed); Zaucha (penalty scored); Tavares (penalty missed); Furtak (penalty scored)		(penalty scored) Marcjanik; (penalty missed) Rzuchowski; (penalty scored) Navarro; (penalty missed) Kocaba; (penalty scored) Oliveira

30 October 2024 Round of 32	Arka Gdynia	1–3 (a.e.t.)	Piast Gliwice	Gdynia
20:30 CET (UTC+01:00)	Skóra 57'	Report	Rosołek 60'; Szczepański 113'; Piasecki 118' (pen.)	Stadium: Gdynia Stadium; Attendance: 4,786; Referee: Grzegorz Kawałko (Olsztyn)
