= 2024–25 Zagłębie Lubin season =

Zagłębie Lubin
2024–25 season
- Manager: Waldemar Fornalik
- Stadium: Lubin Stadium
- Ekstraklasa: 10th
- Polish Cup: Pre-season
Home colours	Away colours	Third colours

The 2024–25 season is the 80th season in the history of Zagłębie Lubin, and the club's 10th consecutive season in Ekstraklasa. In addition to the domestic league, the team is scheduled to participate in the Polish Cup.

== Transfers ==
=== In ===
Pos.	Player	Transferred from	Fee	Date	Source
MF	(Georgia (country)) Tornike Gaprindashvili	(Poland) Arka Gdynia	Loan return	30 June 2024	
FW	(Czech Republic) Václav Sejk	(Czech Republic) Sparta Prague	Loan	3 July 2024	
GK	(Poland) Dominik Hładun	(Poland) Legia Warsaw	Undisclosed	17 July 2024	

=== Out ===
Pos.	Player	Transferred to	Fee	Date	Source
MF	(Georgia (country)) Tornike Gaprindashvili	(Poland) Arka Gdynia		3 July 2024	
GK	(Greece) Sokratis Dioudis	(Turkey) Gaziantep	Contract termination	12 July 2024	
GK	(Poland) Alexander Steffen	(Poland) Błękitni Stargard		15 July 2024	
DF	(Poland) Szymon Karasiński	(Poland) Ruch Chorzów	Loan	16 July 2024	

== Friendlies ==
=== Pre-season ===
28 June 2024 Friendly	Budućnost Podgorica (Montenegro)	3–4	(Poland) Zagłębie Lubin	Turnišče, Slovenia
17:30 UTC+2				Stadium: stadion NK Turnišče

1 July 2024 Friendly	Zagłębie Lubin (Poland)	0–1	(Romania) Rapid București	Ormož, Slovenia
17:30 UTC+2	Terlecki (yellow card) 57'		Stan (yellow card) 56'; Rahmani 82'	Stadium: Športni park Mestna Graba

5 July 2024 Friendly	NK Nafta 1903 (Slovenia)	0–1	(Poland) Zagłębie Lubin	Lendava, Slovenia
16:00 UTC+2			Woźniak 45+2'	Stadium: Nogometna akademija Lendava

10 July 2024 Friendly	Zagłębie Lubin (Poland)	4–2	(Poland) Stilon Gorzów Wielkopolski	Lubin
18:00				Stadium: boczne boisko nr 4 Zagłębia

13 July 2024 Friendly	Zagłębie Lubin (Poland)	1–1	(Poland) GKS Katowice	Lubin
15:30	Sejk 58'		Arak 85'	Stadium: Lubin Stadium

=== Mid-season ===
12 January 2025 Friendly	Zagłębie Lubin (Poland)	1–0	(Romania) Petrolul Ploiești
15:30

23 January 2025 Friendly	Zagłębie Lubin (Poland)	2–1	(Bulgaria) Levski Sofia
15:00

== Competitions ==
=== Overall record ===
Competition	First match	Last match	Starting round	Record							
Competition	First match	Last match	Starting round	Pld	W	D	L	GF	GA	GD	Win %
Ekstraklasa	20 July 2024	24–25 May 2025	Matchday 1	3	1	1	1	3	4	−1	33.33
Polish Cup				0	0	0	0	0	0	+0	—
Total				3	1	1	1	3	4	−1	33.33

Last updated: 2 August 2024
Source: Soccerway

=== Ekstraklasa ===
==== League table ====
Pos	Team	Pld	W	D	L	GF	GA	GD	Pts	Qualification or relegation
13	Widzew Łódź	34	11	7	16	38	49	−11	40	
14	Lechia Gdańsk	34	10	7	17	44	59	−15	37	
15	Zagłębie Lubin	34	10	6	18	33	51	−18	36	
16	Stal Mielec (R)	34	7	10	17	39	56	−17	31	Relegation to I liga
17	Śląsk Wrocław (R)	34	6	12	16	38	53	−15	30	Relegation to I liga

Source: ekstraklasa.org 90minut.pl
Rules for classification: 1) Points; 2) Head-to-head points; 3) Head-to-head goal difference; 4) Goal difference; 5) Goals scored; 6) Number of wins; 7) Number of away wins; 8) Lower number of points based on yellow and red cards (red card = 3 points, yellow card = 1 point, sending-off = 3 points - including 1 point for first yellow card); 9) Fairplay ranking; 10) Draw.
(Note: Head-to-head record is used only after all the matches between the teams in question have been played)
(R) Relegated

==== Results summary ====
Overall								Home						Away					
Pld	W	D	L	GF	GA	GD	Pts	W	D	L	GF	GA	GD	W	D	L	GF	GA	GD
3	1	1	1	3	4	−1	4	1	1	0	3	2	+1	0	0	1	0	2	−2

Last updated: 2 August 2024.

==== Results by round ====
Round	1	2	3
Ground	A	H	H
Result	L	D	W
Position	14		

Updated to match(es) played on 2 August 2024. Source:
A = Away; H = Home; W = Win; D = Draw; L = Loss

==== Matches ====
20 July 2024 1	Legia Warsaw	2–0	Zagłębie Lubin	Warsaw
20:15	Ziółkowski (yellow card) 66'; Augustyniak 86'; Luquinhas 90+3'		Nalepa (red card) 52'	Stadium: Polish Army Stadium; Attendance: 25,542; Referee: Piotr Lasyk

28 July 2024 2	Zagłębie Lubin	2–2	Pogoń Szczecin	Lubin
14:45	Pieńko 19'; Kurminowski 28' (pen.)		Koulouris 17'; Wahlqvist (yellow card) 39'; Paryzek 83'; Kurzawa (yellow card) 90+5'	Stadium: Lubin Stadium; Referee: Paweł Malec

2 August 2024 3	Zagłębie Lubin	1–0	Puszcza Niepołomice	Lubin
18:00	Orlikowski 53'			Stadium: Lubin Stadium; Referee: Patryk Gryckiewicz
