= Marc Navarro =

Spanish footballer

Personal information
- Full name: Marc Navarro Ceciliano
- Date of birth: 2 July 1995 (age 31)
- Place of birth: Barcelona, Spain
- Height: 1.88 m (6 ft 2 in)
- Position: Right-back

Team information
- Current team: Buriram United
- Number: 22

Youth career
- 2001–2002: Badalona
- 2002–2011: Barcelona
- 2011–2014: Espanyol
- 2013–2014: → Damm (loan)

Senior career*
Years	Team	Apps	(Gls)
2014–2017	Espanyol B	44	(7)
2017–2018	Espanyol	31	(3)
2018–2021	Watford	8	(0)
2019–2020	→ Leganés (loan)	4	(0)
2023	El Paso Locomotive	31	(2)
2024–2026	Arka Gdynia	66	(4)
2026–	Buriram United	2	(0)
- * Club domestic league appearances and goals as of 20:03, 21 September 2026 (UTC)

Marc Navarro Ceciliano (born 2 July 1995) is a Spanish professional footballer who plays for Thai League 1 club Buriram United. Mainly a right-back, he can also play as a central defender.

== Club career ==
=== Espanyol ===
Born in Barcelona, Catalonia, Navarro finished his youth career while on loan at CF Damm, after representing CF Badalona, FC Barcelona and RCD Espanyol. In July 2014, he was assigned to the latter's reserve team in the Segunda División B.

Navarro made his senior debut on 2 November 2014, coming on as a second-half substitute for Rober Correa in a 2–1 away loss against Elche CF Ilicitano. His first goal came on 5 September 2015, when he closed the 3–2 home win over FC Barcelona B.

On 22 December 2015, Navarro signed a one-year extension with the club, with his new contract running until June 2017. The following 4 January, however, he suffered a severe knee injury, being sidelined for six months.

Navarro made his first-team – and La Liga – debut on 21 January 2017, starting and scoring the last goal in a 3–1 home victory against Granada CF and becoming the first youth graduate to achieve the feat since Raúl Tamudo in 1997. Eight days later, in his second appearance, he netted his side's second in a 3–1 defeat of Sevilla FC also at the RCDE Stadium.

On 30 January 2017, Navarro extended his contract until 2021, being definitely promoted to the first team the following campaign.

=== Watford ===
On 15 June 2018, Navarro joined Watford on a five-year deal for €2 million. His maiden Premier League appearance took place on 29 September, when he played 84 minutes in the 2–0 loss at Arsenal.

After only five competitive appearances in his first season, Navarro returned to Spain and its top tier after agreeing to a one-year loan at CD Leganés on 24 July 2019. He left Watford by mutual consent in August 2021.

=== El Paso Locomotive ===
On 3 November 2022, Navarro signed for USL Championship club El Paso Locomotive FC. One year later, having made the league's Team of the Week on two occasions, it was announced that he would not be returning for 2024.

=== Arka Gdynia ===
On 29 March 2024, Navarro joined Arka Gdynia of the Polish I liga until the end of the season, with an option for another year. He made his debut on 21 April, starting a 2–0 home victory over Wisła Płock. In late May, as previously arranged, his contract was extended.

Navarro contributed nine assists in the 2024–25 campaign, in a promotion to the Ekstraklasa as champions.

== Personal life ==
Navarro was a childhood friend of compatriot Héctor Bellerín, who also played in England with Arsenal. The former commented that both used to play football together in the garden of his grandmother's house.

== Career statistics ==
As of match played 23 May 2026

Appearances and goals by club, season and competition
Club	Season	League			National cup (Note: Includes Copa del Rey, FA Cup, Polish Cup)		League cup (Note: Includes EFL Cup)		Other		Total	
Club	Season	Division	Apps	Goals	Apps	Goals	Apps	Goals	Apps	Goals	Apps	Goals
Espanyol B	2014–15	Segunda División B	13	0	—		—		—		13	0
Espanyol B	2015–16	Segunda División B	17	4	—		—		—		17	4
Espanyol B	2016–17	Segunda División B	14	3	—		—		—		14	3
Espanyol B	Total		44	7	—		—		—		44	7
Espanyol	2015–16	La Liga	0	0	0	0	—		—		0	0
Espanyol	2016–17	La Liga	12	2	0	0	—		—		12	2
Espanyol	2017–18	La Liga	19	1	5	0	—		—		24	1
Espanyol	Total		31	3	5	0	—		—		36	3
Watford	2018–19	Premier League	2	0	1	0	2	0	—		5	0
Watford	2019–20	Premier League	0	0	0	0	0	0	—		0	0
Watford	2020–21	Championship	6	0	1	0	1	0	—		8	0
Watford	Total		8	0	2	0	3	0	—		13	0
Leganés (loan)	2019–20	La Liga	4	0	2	0	—		—		6	0
El Paso Locomotive	2023	USL Championship	31	2	0	0	—		—		31	2
Arka Gdynia	2023–24	I liga	6	0	—		—		2 (Note: Appearances in I liga promotion play-offs)	0	8	0
Arka Gdynia	2024–25	I liga	30	2	2	1	—		—		32	3
Arka Gdynia	2025–26	Ekstraklasa	28	2	2	0	—		—		30	2
Arka Gdynia	Total		64	4	4	1	—		2	0	70	5
Career total			182	16	13	1	3	0	2	0	200	17

== Honours ==
Arka Gdynia

- I liga: 2024–25
