= Kike Hermoso =

Spanish footballer (born 1999)

Personal information
- Full name: Enrique Gómez Hermoso
- Date of birth: 10 August 1999 (age 27)
- Place of birth: Madrid, Spain
- Height: 1.90 m (6 ft 3 in)
- Position: Centre-back

Team information
- Current team: Lugo

Youth career
- Alcobendas
- 2017: Rayo Vallecano

Senior career*
Years	Team	Apps	(Gls)
2017–2019	Rayo Vallecano B	41	(3)
2019–2020	Huesca	3	(0)
2019–2020	Ejea	17	(0)
2020–2022	Betis B	36	(0)
2021–2022	Betis	1	(1)
2022–2023	Vilafranquense	5	(0)
2023–2024	Rayo Majadahonda	31	(4)
2024–2026	Arka Gdynia	44	(4)
2026–	Lugo	0	(0)
- * Club domestic league appearances and goals as of 11:08, 21 May 2026 (UTC)

Enrique Gómez "Kike" Hermoso (born 10 August 1999) is a Spanish professional footballer who plays as a centre-back for Primera Federación club Lugo.

== Club career ==
Hermoso was born in Madrid, and joined Rayo Vallecano's youth setup in 2017 from Alcobendas CF. He made his senior debut with the reserves on 2 September of that year, starting in a 2–0 Tercera División home win against RSD Alcalá.

Hermoso scored his first senior goal on 12 November 2017, netting the opener in a 4–1 home routing of CD Los Yébenes San Bruno. On 9 July 2019, he moved to SD Huesca and was assigned to the farm team in Segunda División B.

Hermoso made his professional debut on 18 August 2019, starting in a 1–0 away defeat of UD Las Palmas. On 1 October of the following year, he moved to another reserve team, Betis Deportivo Balompié in the third division.

On 29 August 2022, Liga Portugal 2 side Vilafranquense announced the signing of Hermoso.

On 7 August 2023, Hermoso signed for Primera Federación club Rayo Majadahonda.

On 7 July 2024, he moved to Polish second-tier club Arka Gdynia on a one-year deal with an option for another year. At the end of the 2025–26 Ekstraklasa season, where Arka were relegated after just one season in the top flight, the club announced that he would leave Arka at the expiration of his contract. Overall, he made 44 appearances for Arka.

On 2 September 2026, Hermoso moved back to Spain to sign with third-tier side CD Lugo for the remainder of the season, with an option for a further year.

== Career statistics ==
As of match played 18 May 2026

Appearances and goals by club, season and competition
Club	Season	League			National cup (Note: Includes Copa del Rey, Taça de Portugal)		Other		Total	
Club	Season	Division	Apps	Goals	Apps	Goals	Apps	Goals	Apps	Goals
Rayo Vallecano B	2017–18	Tercera División	20	2	—		—		20	2
Rayo Vallecano B	2018–19	Tercera División	21	1	—		—		21	1
Rayo Vallecano B	Total		41	3	0	0	0	0	41	3
Huesca	2019–20	Segunda División	3	0	0	0	—		3	0
Ejea	2019–20	Segunda División B	17	0	0	0	—		17	0
Betis B	2020–21	Segunda División B	13	0	—		—		13	0
Betis B	2021–22	Primera División RFEF	23	0	—		—		23	0
Betis B	Total		36	0	0	0	0	0	36	0
Betis	2021–22	La Liga	1	1	2	0	—		3	1
Vilafranquense	2022–23	Liga Portugal 2	5	0	2	0	1 (Note: Appearance in Taça da Liga)	0	8	0
Rayo Majadahonda	2023–24	Primera Federación	31	4	0	0	—		31	4
Arka Gdynia	2024–25	I liga	23	3	0	0	—		23	3
Arka Gdynia	2025–26	Ekstraklasa	21	1	0	0	—		21	1
Arka Gdynia	Total		44	4	0	0	—		44	4
Career total			178	12	4	0	1	0	183	12

== Honours ==
Betis

- Copa del Rey: 2021–22

Arka Gdynia

- I liga: 2024–25
