= Tornike Gaprindashvili =

Georgian footballer (born 1997)

Personal information
- Date of birth: 20 June 1997 (age 29)
- Place of birth: Tbilisi, Georgia
- Height: 1.71 m (5 ft 7 in)
- Positions: Right winger; attacking midfielder

Team information
- Current team: Samgurali Tskaltubo

Senior career*
Years	Team	Apps	(Gls)
2014–2015	Sasco Tbilisi	6	(0)
2016–2018	Gagra	83	(14)
2019–2022	Dinamo Batumi	79	(14)
2022–2024	Zagłębie Lubin	27	(2)
2022–2023	Zagłębie Lubin II	7	(3)
2024	→ Arka Gdynia (loan)	16	(0)
2024–2026	Arka Gdynia	51	(3)
2026–	Samgurali Tskaltubo	0	(0)

International career
2014	Georgia U17	1	(0)
- * Club domestic league appearances and goals as of 22 May 2026

Tornike Gaprindashvili (Georgian: თორნიკე გაფრინდაშვილი; born 20 July 1997) is a Georgian professional footballer who plays as a right winger or attacking midfielder for Erovnuli Liga club Samgurali Tskaltubo.

== Club career ==
=== Early years ===
Gaprindashvili began his career at Sasco Tbilisi, where he played until 2015. On 1 January 2016, he moved to Gagra, where he played for three years.

=== Dinamo Batumi ===
On 1 January 2019, Gaprindashvili joined Dinamo Batumi on a free transfer. He made his debut for the team on 5 March 2019, in a 0–2 loss against Torpedo Kutaisi, playing the entire second half. On 13 April 2019, he scored his first goal for Dinamo in the 82nd minute of a 2–0 victory over Rustavi. He recorded his first assist a week later in a 2–1 win against Locomotive Tbilisi, assisting a goal by Flamarion in the 90th minute. In total, he made 79 league appearances, scoring 14 goals and providing 10 assists. With Dinamo, he won the club's first-ever Georgian championship in 2021.

=== Zagłębie Lubin ===
On 17 July 2022, Gaprindashvili joined Polish Ekstraklasa club Zagłębie Lubin. On 23 July 2022, he made his debut in an away match of the 2nd round against Legia Warsaw, which ended in a 0–2 defeat, playing 85 minutes. He scored his first goal on 29 July 2022 in a 1–0 victory over Piast Gliwice. He found the net in the 61st minute, and three minutes later, he received a red card.

=== Arka Gdynia ===
In mid-January 2024, he was loaned to Arka Gdynia for a year with a priority transfer option included, as he had fewer first team appearances at Zagłębie. He returned from loan at the end of the 2023–24 season but was quickly brought to Arka on a permanent basis in July.

At Arka, he became one of the leading assisting players in the league. Until April 2025, he nearly always played on the right wing, before being moved to the attacking midfielder role.

At the end of the 2025–26 Ekstraklasa season, which ended with Arka's relegation after just one season in the top flight, Arka announced Gaprindashvili would leave the club at end of June. In total, he made 70 appearances and scored thrice for Arka.

=== Samgurali Tskaltubo ===
On 8 July 2026, Gaprindashvili returned to Georgia and joined Samgurali Tskaltubo.

== International career ==
In 2014, he played one match for the Georgia under-17 team.

== Playing style ==
He most often plays as a right winger but can also occupy other attacking positions. He is left-footed but can also play well with his right foot. He is technically skilled, likes to dribble, and tends to cut inside towards the penalty area.

== Career statistics ==
As of match played 22 March 2026

Appearances and goals by club, season and competition
Club	Season	League			National cup (Note: Includes Georgian Cup, Polish Cup)		Europe		Other		Total	
Club	Season	Division	Apps	Goals	Apps	Goals	Apps	Goals	Apps	Goals	Apps	Goals
Sasco Tbilisi	2013–14	Pirveli Liga	6	0	0	0	—		—		6	0
Gagra	2015–16	Pirveli Liga	17	2	0	0	—		—		17	2
Gagra	2016	Pirveli Liga	10	1	0	0	—		—		10	1
Gagra	2017	Erovnuli Liga 2	28	4	1	0	—		—		29	4
Gagra	2018	Erovnuli Liga 2	28	7	5	0	—		2 (Note: Appearances in Erovnuli Liga promotion/relegation play-offs)	0	35	7
Gagra	Total		83	14	6	0	—		2	0	91	14
Dinamo Batumi	2019	Erovnuli Liga	26	3	1	0	—		—		27	3
Dinamo Batumi	2020	Erovnuli Liga	13	1	1	0	1 (Note: Appearance in UEFA Europa League)	0	—		15	1
Dinamo Batumi	2021	Erovnuli Liga	22	5	3	1	4 (Note: Appearances in UEFA Europa Conference League)	0	—		29	6
Dinamo Batumi	2022	Erovnuli Liga	18	5	0	0	—		1 (Note: Appearance in Georgian Super Cup)	0	19	5
Dinamo Batumi	Total		79	14	5	0	5	0	1	0	0	0
Zagłębie Lubin	2022–23	Ekstraklasa	23	2	2	0	—		—		25	2
Zagłębie Lubin	2023–24	Ekstraklasa	4	0	1	1	—		—		5	1
Zagłębie Lubin	Total		27	2	3	1	—		—		30	3
Zagłębie Lubin II	2022–23	II liga	3	1	—		—		—		3	1
Zagłębie Lubin II	2023–24	II liga	4	2	0	0	—		—		4	2
Zagłębie Lubin II	Total		7	3	0	0	—		—		7	3
Arka Gdynia (loan)	2023–24	I liga	14	0	—		—		2 (Note: Appearances in I liga promotion play-offs)	0	16	0
Arka Gdynia	2024–25	I liga	34	3	2	0	—		—		36	3
Arka Gdynia	2025–26	Ekstraklasa	17	0	1	0	—		—		18	0
Arka Gdynia	Total		65	3	3	0	—		2	0	70	3
Career total			267	36	17	2	5	0	5	0	294	38

== Honours ==
Dinamo Batumi

- Erovnuli Liga: 2021
- Georgian Super Cup: 2022

Arka Gdynia

- I liga: 2024–25
