= Jędrzej Grobelny =

Polish professional footballer

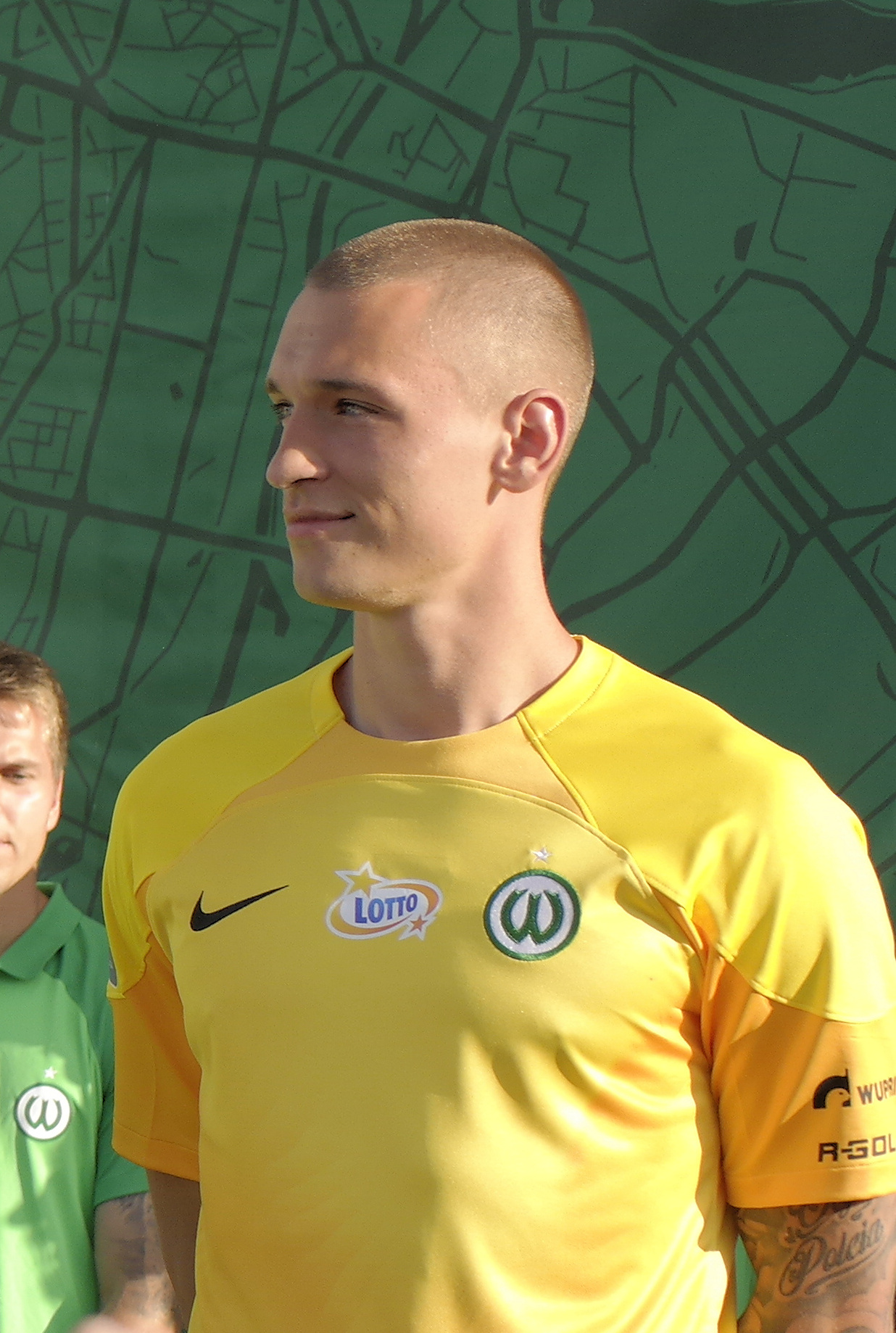
- Grobelny in 2023 with Warta Poznań

Personal information
- Full name: Jędrzej Grobelny
- Date of birth: 28 June 2001 (age 25)
- Place of birth: Poznań, Poland
- Height: 1.88 m (6 ft 2 in)
- Position: Goalkeeper

Team information
- Current team: Arka Gdynia
- Number: 33

Youth career
- –2017: Warta Poznań

Senior career*
Years	Team	Apps	(Gls)
2017–2021	Pogoń Szczecin II	27	(0)
2020–2021	→ Miedź Legnica (loan)	7	(0)
2020–2021	→ Miedź Legnica II (loan)	4	(0)
2021–2025	Warta Poznań	53	(0)
2025–	Arka Gdynia	9	(0)

International career
2017–2018	Poland U17	4	(0)
2019	Poland U19	2	(0)
- * Club domestic league appearances and goals as of 17:28, 25 May 2026 (UTC)

Jędrzej Grobelny (born 28 June 2001) is a Polish professional footballer who plays as a goalkeeper for I liga club Arka Gdynia.

== Career ==
On 11 June 2021, Grobelny returned to his childhood club Warta Poznań, signing a three-year contract with the Ekstraklasa side to serve as back-up for Adrian Lis. After Lis suffered an injury in a 2–2 home draw against Ruch Chorzów on 19 August 2023, Grobelny replaced him in the starting line-up, and eventually established himself as Warta's first-choice goalkeeper across the season. On 11 April 2024, he signed a new one-year deal with the club, with an extension option for another two years.

On 22 January 2025, Grobelny moved on a free transfer to fellow I liga club Arka Gdynia on a deal until mid-2026 with a one-year extension option.

== Career statistics ==
As of match played 23 May 2026

Appearances and goals by club, season and competition
Club	Season	League			Polish Cup		Europe		Other		Total	
Club	Season	Division	Apps	Goals	Apps	Goals	Apps	Goals	Apps	Goals	Apps	Goals
Pogoń Szczecin II	2017–18	III liga, gr. II	4	0	—		—		—		4	0
Pogoń Szczecin II	2018–19	III liga, gr. II	12	0	—		—		—		12	0
Pogoń Szczecin II	2019–20	III liga, gr. II	11	0	—		—		—		11	0
Pogoń Szczecin II	Total		27	0	—		—		—		27	0
Miedź Legnica (loan)	2020–21	I liga	7	0	0	0	—		—		7	0
Miedź Legnica II (loan)	2020–21	III liga, gr. III	4	0	—		—		—		4	0
Warta Poznań	2021–22	Ekstraklasa	9	0	0	0	—		—		9	0
Warta Poznań	2022–23	Ekstraklasa	6	0	2	0	—		—		8	0
Warta Poznań	2023–24	Ekstraklasa	25	0	1	0	—		—		26	0
Warta Poznań	2024–25	I liga	13	0	1	0	—		—		14	0
Warta Poznań	Total		53	0	4	0	—		—		57	0
Arka Gdynia	2024–25	I liga	2	0	—		—		—		2	0
Arka Gdynia	2025–26	Ekstraklasa	7	0	2	0	—		—		9	0
Arka Gdynia	Total		9	0	2	0	—		—		11	0
Career total			100	0	6	0	—		—		106	0

== Honours ==
Arka Gdynia

- I liga: 2024–25
