= Hide Vitalucci =

Japanese-Italian footballer (born 2002)

Personal information
- Full name: Hide Kengei Vitalucci
- Date of birth: 5 March 2002 (age 24)
- Place of birth: Rome, Italy
- Height: 1.75 m (5 ft 9 in)
- Position: Attacking midfielder

Team information
- Current team: Arka Gdynia
- Number: 10

Youth career
- –2019: Nagoya Grampus
- 2019–2021: Frosinone

Senior career*
| Years | Team | Apps | (Gls) |
| 2021–2022 | Frosinone | 0 | (0) |
| 2021–2022 | → Pergolettese (loan) | 25 | (3) |
| 2022–2023 | Pergolettese | 21 | (1) |
| 2024 | Chojniczanka Chojnice | 13 | (5) |
| 2024– | Arka Gdynia | 38 | (5) |
| 2026 | → Polonia Warsaw (loan) | 3 | (0) |
- * Club domestic league appearances and goals as of 17:50, 3 March 2026 (UTC)

Hide Kengei Vitalucci (Japanese: ヒデ・ケンゲイ・ヴィタルッシー; born 5 March 2002) is a Japanese-Italian professional footballer who plays as an attacking midfielder for I liga club Arka Gdynia.

== Career ==
A former youth academy player of Nagoya Grampus, Vitalucci joined Italian club Frosinone in 2019.

On 15 July 2021, he joined Serie C side Pergolettese on a season-long loan deal. He made his professional debut for the club on 21 August, in a goalless Coppa Italia Serie C draw against Pro Vercelli. On 26 September, he scored his first professional goal for the club in a 2–2 league draw with Virtus Verona. On 21 November, he scored a brace in a 4–0 league win over Pro Vercelli.

On 22 July 2022, his deal with Pergolettese was officially turned permanent. On 1 September 2023, Vitalucci's contract with the club was terminated by mutual consent.

On 6 March 2024, Vitalucci joined Polish II liga club Chojniczanka Chojnice on a contract until June 2025, with an option for a further year.

On 6 July 2024, Vitalucci joined Polish I liga club Arka Gdynia for an undisclosed fee, reported to be approximately €70,000, signing a three-year deal with the Pomeranian side. On 3 August 2024, he scored his first goal for the club in a 3–0 away league win over Polonia Warsaw. On 23 January 2026, he joined Polonia Warsaw on loan until the end of the season. In late February, his season was cut short after suffering an anterior cruciate ligament injury in training.

== Personal life ==
Born in Rome, Italy, to a Japanese mother and an Italian father, he moved to Japan at the age of two.

== Career statistics ==
As of match played 21 February 2026

Appearances and goals by club, season and competition
| Club | Season | League | | | National cup (Note: Includes Polish Cup) | | Continental | | Other | | Total | |
| Club | Season | Division | Apps | Goals | Apps | Goals | Apps | Goals | Apps | Goals | Apps | Goals |
|---|---|---|---|---|---|---|---|---|---|---|---|---|
| Pergolettese (loan) | 2021–22 | Serie C | 25 | 3 | — | | — | | 2 (Note: One appearance in Coppa Italia Serie C, one appearance in Serie C promotion-play-offs) | 0 | 27 | 3 |
| Pergolettese | 2022–23 | Serie C | 21 | 1 | — | | — | | 1 (Note: Appearance(s) in Coppa Italia Serie C) | 1 | 22 | 2 |
| Pergolettese | Total | | 46 | 4 | — | | — | | 3 | 1 | 49 | 5 |
| Chojniczanka Chojnice | 2023–24 | II liga | 12 | 5 | — | | — | | 1 (Note: Appearance(s) in II liga promotion play-offs) | 0 | 13 | 5 |
| Arka Gdynia | 2024–25 | I liga | 32 | 5 | 2 | 0 | — | | — | | 34 | 5 |
| Arka Gdynia | 2025–26 | Ekstraklasa | 6 | 0 | 1 | 0 | — | | — | | 7 | 0 |
| Arka Gdynia | Total | | 38 | 5 | 3 | 0 | — | | — | | 41 | 5 |
| Polonia Warsaw (loan) | 2025–26 | I liga | 3 | 0 | — | | — | | 0 | 0 | 3 | 0 |
| Career total | | | 99 | 14 | 3 | 0 | 0 | 0 | 4 | 1 | 106 | 15 |

== Honours ==
Arka Gdynia

- I liga: 2024–25
