= Ernest Terpiłowski =

Polish footballer

Personal information
- Date of birth: 14 September 2001 (age 25)
- Place of birth: Brzeg Dolny, Poland
- Height: 1.76 m (5 ft 9 in)
- Positions: Right-back; attacking midfielder

Team information
- Current team: Polonia Warsaw
- Number: 24

Youth career
- 2011–2018: Lechia Dzierżoniów

Senior career*
Years	Team	Apps	(Gls)
2018–2019	Lechia Dzierżoniów	27	(1)
2019–2022	Bruk-Bet Termalica	20	(1)
2020–2021	→ Górnik Polkowice (loan)	33	(8)
2022–2024	Widzew Łódź	55	(6)
2024–	Polonia Warsaw	44	(1)

International career
2021	Poland U20	4	(0)
- * Club domestic league appearances and goals as of 15:37, 29 May 2026 (UTC)

Ernest Terpiłowski (born 14 September 2001) is a Polish professional footballer who plays as a right-back or attacking midfielder for I liga club Polonia Warsaw.

== Career statistics ==
As of match played 28 May 2026

Appearances and goals by club, season and competition
Club	Season	League			Polish Cup		Continental		Other		Total	
Club	Season	Division	Apps	Goals	Apps	Goals	Apps	Goals	Apps	Goals	Apps	Goals
Lechia Dzierżoniów	2017–18	III liga, gr. III	8	0	0	0	—		0	0	8	0
Lechia Dzierżoniów	2018–19	III liga, gr. III	19	1	1	0	—		0	0	20	1
Lechia Dzierżoniów	Total		27	1	1	0	—		0	0	28	1
Bruk-Bet Termalica	2019–20	I liga	9	0	1	0	—		0	0	10	0
Bruk-Bet Termalica	2021–22	Ekstraklasa	11	1	1	0	—		0	0	12	1
Bruk-Bet Termalica	Total		20	1	2	0	—		0	0	22	1
Górnik Polkowice (loan)	2020–21	II liga	33	8	1	0	—		0	0	34	8
Widzew Łódź	2021–22	I liga	13	2	0	0	—		—		13	2
Widzew Łódź	2022–23	Ekstraklasa	25	3	0	0	—		—		25	3
Widzew Łódź	2023–24	Ekstraklasa	17	1	3	0	—		—		20	1
Widzew Łódź	Total		55	6	3	0	—		0	0	58	6
Polonia Warsaw	2024–25	I liga	31	1	4	0	—		1 (Note: Appearance in I liga promotion play-offs)	0	36	1
Polonia Warsaw	2025–26	I liga	11	0	0	0	—		1	0	12	0
Polonia Warsaw	Total		42	1	4	0	—		2	0	48	1
Career total			177	17	11	0	0	0	2	0	190	17

== Honours ==
Lechia Dzierżoniów

- Polish Cup (Wałbrzych regionals): 2017–18, 2018–19

Górnik Polkowice

- II liga: 2020–21

Polonia Warsaw II

- V liga Masovia I: 2025–26
