= Karol Czubak =

Polish footballer (born 2000)

- Czubak with Motor Lublin in 2026

Personal information
- Full name: Karol Łukasz Czubak
- Date of birth: 25 January 2000 (age 26)
- Place of birth: Słupsk, Poland
- Height: 1.93 m (6 ft 4 in)
- Position: Forward

Team information
- Current team: Motor Lublin
- Number: 10

Youth career
- –2013: Sparta Sycewice
- 2013–2014: Bałtyk Koszalin
- 2014–2015: Jantar Ustka

Senior career*
Years	Team	Apps	(Gls)
2015–2019	Jantar Ustka		
2019–2020	Bytovia Bytów	32	(18)
2020–2021	Widzew Łódź	16	(2)
2021–2025	Arka Gdynia	120	(63)
2025	Kortrijk	8	(0)
2025–	Motor Lublin	46	(25)

International career^{‡}
2019	Poland U20	2	(0)
2026–	Poland	1	(0)
- * Club domestic league appearances and goals as of 13:13, 8 November 2026 (UTC) ‡ National team caps and goals as of 20:56, 3 June 2026 (UTC)

Karol Łukasz Czubak (born 25 January 2000) is a Polish professional footballer who plays as a forward for Ekstraklasa club Motor Lublin, which he captains, and the Poland national team.

== Club career ==
=== Youth career and Jantar ===
Starting his youth career with Sparta Sycewice, Czubak underwent a trial with Barcelona's youth teams in 2013. Soon after, he joined Bałtyk Koszalin for one year before moving to Jantar Ustka. He started his senior career with the Pomeranian team, making his first IV liga appearance at the age of 15.

In 2016, he was the top scorer of the Poland futsal under-16 championship, with Jantar finishing the competition as runners-up. In the 2017–18 season of the Słupsk regional league, he scored 46 goals, aiding his team in earning promotion to IV liga Pomerania. In June 2018, he joined Ekstraklasa club Śląsk Wrocław for their pre-season camp. In the following campaign, he scored 23 goals in 33 matches.

=== Bytovia Bytów ===
On 17 July 2019, he was transferred to third division club Bytovia Bytów. He scored 18 goals and recorded four assists as Bytovia reached the promotion play-off semi-final, lost to Resovia Rzeszów after a penalty shootout.

=== Widzew Łódź ===
On 13 August 2020, Czubak joined I liga side Widzew Łódź on a two-year deal. He scored two goals in 17 appearances before leaving by mutual consent on 6 August 2021.

=== Arka Gdynia ===
Hours after his Widzew exit, fellow second division outfit Arka Gdynia announced the signing of Czubak on a three-year contract. He was the I liga top scorer in the 2022–23 season with 21 goals in 33 league fixtures, including a hat-trick in a 3–0 away win over Sandecja Nowy Sącz on 26 February 2023.

In September 2024, he extended his contract with Arka until mid-2026. On 6 October 2024, he recorded his second hat-trick for the club in a 6–0 away win over Odra Opole, scoring all three goals in the first half. With this feat, he surpassed Grzegorz Niciński as the third best scorer in the Pomeranian club's history.

On 24 November 2024, he entered the pitch in the 10th minute of Marcus Vinícius' farewell game, a home league fixture against Stal Stalowa Wola, replacing the Brazilian. Czubak went on to score his 63rd, 64th and 65th Arka goal during a 5–1 win, equalling and surpassing Vinícius as the club's best goalscorer of all time.

=== Kortrijk ===
On 29 January 2025, Czubak signed a two-and-a-half-year contract with Kortrijk in Belgium. He made his debut on 2 February, entering the pitch in the 68th minute of a 1–2 league loss to Westerlo. Czubak played 73 minutes in eight games as Kortrijk suffered relegation to the Challenger Pro League.

=== Motor Lublin ===
On 25 June 2025, Czubak returned to Poland, joining Ekstraklasa club Motor Lublin on a two-year deal, with a two-year extension option. In his first season in the Polish top-tier, he scored 18 goals and provided three assists across 32 league appearances and was named the Ekstraklasa Forward of the Season.

== International career ==
Czubak earned his first and only caps at youth international level in November 2019, making two appearances for the Poland under-20 team against Switzerland and Norway. He received his first call-up to the Poland senior team in May 2026 for friendlies against Ukraine and Nigeria. He made his debut against the latter on 3 June, entering the pitch in the final minutes of a 2–2 draw.

== Career statistics ==
=== Club ===
As of match played 23 May 2026

Appearances and goals by club, season and competition
Club	Season	League			National cup (Note: Includes Polish Cup)		Europe		Other		Total	
Club	Season	Division	Apps	Goals	Apps	Goals	Apps	Goals	Apps	Goals	Apps	Goals
Jantar Ustka (Note: Data from 2015–16 & 2016–17 seasons unavailable.)	2017–18	Regional league	28	46	—		—		—		28	46
Jantar Ustka	2018–19	IV liga Pomerania	33	23	—		—		—		33	23
Jantar Ustka	Total		61	69	—		—		—		61	69
Bytovia Bytów	2019–20	II liga	31	18	1	0	—		1 (Note: Appearance in II liga promotion play-offs)	0	33	18
Widzew Łódź	2020–21	I liga	16	2	1	0	—		—		17	2
Arka Gdynia	2021–22	I liga	32	12	4	2	—		0	0	36	14
Arka Gdynia	2022–23	I liga	33	21	1	0	—		—		34	21
Arka Gdynia	2023–24	I liga	34	15	3	0	—		2 (Note: Appearances in I liga promotion play-offs)	1	39	16
Arka Gdynia	2024–25	I liga	19	14	2	1	—		—		21	15
Arka Gdynia	Total		118	62	10	3	—		2	1	130	66
Kortrijk	2024–25	Belgian Pro League	5	0	—		—		3 (Note: Appearances in Belgian Pro League relegation play-offs)	0	8	0
Motor Lublin	2025–26	Ekstraklasa	32	18	1	0	—		—		33	18
Career total			263	169	13	3	0	0	6	1	282	173

=== International ===
As of match played 3 June 2026

Appearances and goals by national team and year
National team	Year	Apps	Goals
Poland	2026	1	0
Total		1	0

== Honours ==
Jantar Ustka

- Regional league Słupsk: 2017–18

Individual

- Ekstraklasa Forward of the Season: 2025–26
- I liga top scorer: 2022–23
- I liga Player of the Year: 2023
- I liga Player of the Month: April 2023, September 2024
