= 2022–23 I liga =

Polish football season

I liga
- Season: 2022–23
- Dates: 15 July 2022 – 11 June 2023
- Champions: ŁKS Łódź
- Promoted: ŁKS Łódź; Ruch Chorzów; Puszcza Niepołomice
- Relegated: Sandecja Nowy Sącz; Chojniczanka Chojnice; Skra Częstochowa
- Matches: 306
- Goals: 808 (2.64 per match)
- Top goalscorer: Karol Czubak (21 goals)
- Biggest home win: Podeskidzie 6–0 Chrobry (10 March 2023); Stal 6–0 Zagłębie (8 April 2023)
- Biggest away win: Sandecja 0–5 GKS Tychy (22 August 2022); Skra 0–5 Resovia (8 April 2023)
- Highest scoring: Puszcza 5–2 Sandecja (11 September 2022); Arka 3–4 Chrobry (16 September 2022); Stal 3–4 Resovia (1 October 2022); ŁKS Łódź 5–2 Chrobry (25 February 2023); Podeskidzie 4–3 Resovia (3 June 2023)
- Longest winning run: 7 matches Wisła Kraków
- Longest unbeaten run: 14 matches Termalica Nieciecza
- Longest winless run: 12 matches Sandecja Nowy Sącz; Skra Częstochowa
- Longest losing run: 8 matches Skra Częstochowa
- Highest attendance: 22,117; Wisła 1–1 Ruch (16 September 2022)
- Lowest attendance: 0 (Note: Matches have been played behind closed doors without any spectators.); Skra 1–1 Odra (22 April 2023); Skra 0–1 GKS T. (7 May 2023); Skra 0–1 Górnik (12 May 2023); Skra 0–3 Puszcza (29 May 2023)
- Total attendance: 1,079,040
- Average attendance: 3,526 ▲24.9%

The 2022–23 I liga (also known as Fortuna I liga due to sponsorship reasons) was the 75th season of the second tier domestic division in the Polish football league system since its establishment in 1949 and the 15th season of the Polish I liga under its current title. The league is operated by the PZPN.

The regular season was played as a round-robin tournament. A total of 18 teams participated, 12 of which competed in the league campaign during the previous season, while three who were relegated from the 2021–22 Ekstraklasa and the remaining three who were promoted from the 2021–22 II liga. The season started on 15 July 2022 and concluded on 11 June 2023. Each team played a total of 34 matches, half at home and half away.

== Teams ==
A total of 18 teams participated in the 2022–23 I liga season.

=== Changes from last season ===
The following teams have changed division since the 2021–22 season.

==== To I liga ====
Relegated from 2021–22 Ekstraklasa	Promoted from 2021–22 II liga
▼ Bruk-Bet Termalica Nieciecza ▼ Wisła Kraków ▼ Górnik Łęczna	▲ Stal Rzeszów ▲ Chojniczanka Chojnice ▲ Ruch Chorzów

==== From I liga ====
Promoted to 2022–23 Ekstraklasa	Relegated to 2022–23 II liga
▲ Miedź Legnica ▲ Widzew Łódź ▲ Korona Kielce	▼ Stomil Olsztyn ▼ Górnik Polkowice ▼GKS Jastrzębie

=== Stadiums and locations ===
Location of teams in 2022–23 I liga.
Location of teams in the Metropolis GZM in 2022–23 I liga.

Note: Table lists in alphabetical order.

Team	Location	Venue	Capacity
Arka Gdynia	Gdynia	Stadion GOSiR	15,139
Bruk-Bet Termalica Nieciecza	Nieciecza	Stadion Bruk-Bet	4,666
Chojniczanka Chojnice	Chojnice	Stadion Miejski Chojniczanka 1930	3,500
Chrobry Głogów	Głogów	Stadion GOS	2,817
GKS Katowice	Katowice	Stadion GKS Katowice	6,710
GKS Tychy	Tychy	Stadion Tychy	15,150
Górnik Łęczna	Łęczna	Stadion Górnika Łęczna	7,464
ŁKS Łódź	Łódź	Stadion im. Władysława Króla	18,033
Odra Opole	Opole	Stadion Odry	4,560
Podbeskidzie Bielsko-Biała	Bielsko-Biała	Stadion BBOSiR	15,076
Puszcza Niepołomice	Niepołomice	Stadion Puszczy	2,118
Resovia Rzeszów	Rzeszów	Stadion Stal^{1}	11,547
Ruch Chorzów	Chorzów	Stadion Ruchu Chorzów; Stadion im. Piotra Wieczorka^{2}	9,300 (Ruch); 10,037 (Piast)
Sandecja Nowy Sącz	Nowy Sącz	Stadion Puszczy^{3}	2,118
Skra Częstochowa	Częstochowa	GIEKSA Arena; Stoelzle Stadion STO^{4}	5,264 (GIEKSA Arena); 0 (SSS)
Stal Rzeszów	Rzeszów	Stadion Stal	11,547
Wisła Kraków	Kraków	Stadion im. Henryka Reymana	33,326
Zagłębie Sosnowiec	Sosnowiec	Stadion Ludowy; ArcelorMittal Park^{5}	7,500 (Ludowy); 11,600 (ArcelorMittal)

1. Due to the renovation of the Resovia Stadium in Rzeszów, Resovia played their home games at Stal Stadium in Rzeszów.
2. In the first half of the 2022–23 season Ruch played every home match in Stadion Ruchu Chorzów, but since it has ongoing work on it, Ruch played the second half of the season at Stadion im. Piotra Wieczorka (usually hosting home matched of Piast Gliwice).
3. Due to renovation of Stadion im. Ojca Władysława Augustynka, Sandecja played their home matches at Puszcza Stadium in Niepołomice.
4. To 8 April 2023 Skra played their home games at a substitute stadium GIEKSA Arena, because Stoelzle Stadion STO in Częstochowa didn't meet the license requirements of the I liga.
5. Zagłębie Sosnowiec played their games on Stadion Ludowy until 18 February 2023. Since 25 February 2023 they moved to ArcelorMittal Park where Zagłębie played the rest of the season on.

== League table ==
Pos	Team	Pld	W	D	L	GF	GA	GD	Pts	Promotion or Relegation
1	ŁKS Łódź (C, P)	34	19	9	6	58	36	+22	66	Promotion to Ekstraklasa
2	Ruch Chorzów (P)	34	17	11	6	48	33	+15	62	Promotion to Ekstraklasa
3	Bruk-Bet Termalica Nieciecza	34	16	13	5	55	37	+18	61	Qualification for Promotion play-offs
4	Wisła Kraków	34	18	6	10	61	38	+23	60	Qualification for Promotion play-offs
5	Puszcza Niepołomice (O, P)	34	16	10	8	49	36	+13	58	Qualification for Promotion play-offs
6	Stal Rzeszów	34	14	9	11	56	43	+13	51	Qualification for Promotion play-offs
7	Podbeskidzie Bielsko-Biała	34	12	13	9	56	47	+9	49	
8	Arka Gdynia	34	13	9	12	56	45	+11	48	
9	Chrobry Głogów	34	12	10	12	44	53	−9	46	
10	GKS Katowice	34	10	14	10	41	39	+2	44	
11	Zagłębie Sosnowiec	34	10	12	12	33	43	−10	42	
12	Górnik Łęczna	34	9	13	12	40	45	−5	40	
13	GKS Tychy	34	10	9	15	46	52	−6	39	
14	Resovia Rzeszów	34	9	11	14	43	51	−8	38	
15	Odra Opole	34	10	7	17	39	48	−9	37	
16	Skra Częstochowa (R)	34	9	4	21	18	49	−31	31	Relegation to II liga
17	Chojniczanka Chojnice (R)	34	5	12	17	35	57	−22	27	Relegation to II liga
18	Sandecja Nowy Sącz (R)	34	5	12	17	28	54	−26	27	Relegation to II liga

Source: 1liga.org, 90minut.pl
Rules for classification: 1) Points; 2) Head-to-head points; 3) Head-to-head goal difference; 4) Goal difference; 6) Goals scored; 7) Number of wins; 8) Number of away wins. (Note: Head-to-head record is used only after all the matches between the teams in question have been played)
(C) Champions; (O) Play-off winner; (P) Promoted; (R) Relegated

== Positions by round ==
Team ╲ Round	1	2	3	4	5	6	7	8	9	10	11	12	13	14	15	16	17	18	19	20	21	22	23	24	25	26	27	28	29	30	31	32	33	34
Arka Gdynia	4	8	12	9	8	6	8	5	3	2	2	4	5	4	3	4	6	6	4	6	5	5	6	6	6	6	7	6	6	7	7	7	6	8
Bruk-Bet Termalica Nieciecza	2	6	13	8	4	5	3	4	6	5	6	6	10	10	10	8	7	5	6	5	3	3	3	4	4	4	3	4	4	3	4	4	3	3
Chojniczanka Chojnice	8	16	17	17	17	17	15	14	14	14	14	13	13	15	15	16	16	15	14	16	15	16	17	18	18	18	18	18	18	18	18	18	17	17
Chrobry Głogów	6	15	10	11	13	14	13	13	10	12	8	7	12	7	6	5	4	4	5	3	6	7	8	8	8	9	9	10	10	10	10	9	10	9
GKS Katowice	1	2	7	6	9	10	7	10	7	7	9	5	3	5	5	7	5	7	8	9	10	10	10	10	10	12	10	9	9	9	9	10	9	10
GKS Tychy	8	13	8	14	14	12	9	9	13	10	11	12	8	12	12	11	11	11	11	11	12	11	11	11	11	10	11	13	12	11	11	12	12	13
Górnik Łęczna	16	14	15	15	15	16	17	16	16	15	16	15	16	14	13	13	13	13	13	12	13	13	12	12	12	11	12	11	11	13	13	11	12	12
ŁKS Łódź	18	10	5	4	2	4	2	3	2	4	3	3	4	3	2	2	1	1	1	1	1	1	1	1	1	1	1	1	1	1	1	1	1	1
Odra Opole	14	17	18	18	16	15	14	15	15	16	15	17	17	17	17	14	15	16	17	14	16	14	15	15	16	15	15	15	14	15	15	15	15	15
Podbeskidzie Bielsko-Biała	16	9	4	3	6	3	6	7	11	8	10	10	6	8	8	6	8	8	9	10	8	9	7	7	7	7	6	7	8	8	8	8	8	7
Puszcza Niepołomice	5	1	6	5	7	9	4	6	4	3	4	2	2	1	1	1	2	2	3	4	4	4	5	5	5	5	5	5	5	4	5	5	5	5
Resovia Rzeszów	14	18	16	16	18	18	18	18	18	18	17	16	15	13	14	15	14	14	16	17	14	15	14	13	14	13	13	12	15	12	12	14	14	14
Ruch Chorzów	10	3	2	1	3	2	5	2	1	1	1	1	1	2	4	3	3	3	2	2	2	2	2	2	2	2	4	2	2	2	2	2	2	2
Sandecja Nowy Sącz	10	11	14	10	12	13	16	17	17	17	18	18	18	18	18	18	18	18	15	15	17	17	18	16	17	17	17	17	17	18	17	17	18	18
Skra Częstochowa	10	5	9	13	10	8	11	12	9	13	13	14	14	16	16	17	17	17	18	18	18	18	16	17	15	16	16	16	16	16	16	16	16	16
Stal Rzeszów	6	12	11	12	11	11	12	8	12	9	5	8	9	6	7	10	9	9	7	8	9	8	9	9	9	8	8	8	7	6	6	6	7	6
Wisła Kraków	10	3	3	2	1	1	1	1	5	6	7	9	11	11	11	9	10	10	10	7	7	6	4	3	3	3	2	3	3	5	3	3	4	4
Zagłębie Sosnowiec	2	7	1	7	5	7	10	11	8	11	12	11	7	9	9	12	12	12	12	13	11	12	13	14	13	14	14	14	13	14	14	13	11	11

I liga champion Promotion to Ekstraklasa
Promotion to Ekstraklasa
Qualification for promotion play-offs
Relegation to II liga

Source: 90minut.pl

== Results ==
Home \ Away	ARK	BBT	CCH	CHG	KAT	TYC	GKŁ	ŁKS	ODO	POD	PNI	RES	RCH	SNS	SKC	STR	WKR	ZSO
Arka Gdynia	—	1–2	2–1	3–4	2–2	5–0	0–1	1–1	1–2	2–2	1–1	4–0	0–2	1–1	0–1	2–2	1–3	0–0
Bruk-Bet Termalica Nieciecza	2–1	—	2–2	3–1	1–1	0–2	2–2	2–2	2–1	2–2	2–1	3–0	2–1	3–0	1–0	2–1	0–0	2–0
Chojniczanka Chojnice	1–3	0–0	—	0–2	3–3	2–2	2–1	1–0	1–2	2–3	1–1	1–2	0–1	2–0	2–0	1–1	1–0	0–0
Chrobry Głogów	0–3	0–2	3–1	—	0–0	4–1	1–1	2–3	2–2	0–1	1–0	1–1	0–2	0–0	1–0	3–3	2–1	0–0
GKS Katowice	0–1	3–3	3–0	1–0	—	1–1	2–0	1–5	0–2	1–1	2–2	0–1	2–1	0–0	0–1	0–0	1–3	3–1
GKS Tychy	2–2	0–1	1–1	2–2	0–3	—	2–1	0–1	2–0	1–4	2–3	1–1	2–2	2–3	5–0	0–0	3–1	1–0
Górnik Łęczna	1–2	2–1	0–0	0–2	2–2	3–2	—	1–1	4–1	3–3	2–2	1–1	1–1	1–1	3–0	1–0	0–0	0–0
ŁKS Łódź	3–1	1–1	2–1	5–2	0–2	1–1	3–2	—	1–0	2–1	2–0	2–1	2–0	1–0	2–1	1–0	3–2	1–1
Odra Opole	1–1	1–2	1–1	1–0	0–1	3–0	0–1	1–2	—	1–2	2–3	1–1	1–1	4–2	1–0	2–0	0–1	1–4
Podbeskidzie Bielsko-Biała	0–1	2–2	4–1	6–0	1–0	1–0	1–0	1–1	0–0	—	0–1	4–3	0–1	2–0	0–1	2–2	0–3	2–2
Puszcza Niepołomice	2–0	0–0	3–2	0–1	1–1	2–1	1–0	1–0	1–0	1–1	—	0–0	0–1	5–2	3–0	2–1	2–1	0–0
Resovia Rzeszów	1–3	1–2	3–1	1–1	0–1	0–1	1–0	0–3	2–0	2–2	2–1	—	1–1	0–0	1–2	1–2	0–2	2–2
Ruch Chorzów	2–4	2–1	1–1	1–0	1–0	1–0	1–1	3–3	3–0	2–2	2–0	1–3	—	2–1	0–0	2–0	2–0	2–0
Sandecja Nowy Sącz	0–3	1–1	2–1	0–1	1–1	0–5	3–0	1–0	0–2	0–3	2–3	1–1	0–1	—	1–2	0–1	1–1	4–1
Skra Częstochowa	1–2	0–2	2–0	1–2	0–1	0–1	0–1	1–2	1–1	1–0	0–3	0–5	1–1	0–0	—	0–1	0–3	1–0
Stal Rzeszów	2–1	2–2	3–1	3–3	1–1	1–2	1–0	1–0	4–2	5–0	1–0	3–4	2–3	3–0	2–1	—	2–1	6–0
Wisła Kraków	1–0	2–1	3–0	4–1	2–1	2–1	1–2	2–2	2–1	3–3	2–3	2–0	1–1	0–0	3–0	3–1	—	1–2
Zagłębie Sosnowiec	1–2	2–1	1–1	1–2	2–1	1–0	2–2	1–0	0–2	1–0	1–1	2–1	2–0	1–1	0–1	1–0	1–2	—

Source: 90minut.pl
Legend: Blue = home team win; Yellow = draw; Red = away team win.
For upcoming matches, an "a" indicates there is an article about the rivalry between the two participants.

== Results by round ==
Team ╲ Round	1	2	3	4	5	6	7	8	9	10	11	12	13	14	15	16	17	18	19	20	21	22	23	24	25	26	27	28	29	30	31	32	33	34
Arka	W	D	L	D	W	W	L	W	W	W	L	L	D	W	W	L	L	D	W	L	W	W	L	D	D	D	L	W	D	L	L	W	D	L
Nieciecza	W	D	L	W	W	D	W	L	D	D	D	D	L	D	D	W	W	W	D	W	W	W	D	W	D	W	D	L	D	W	L	W	W	W
Chojnczanka	D	L	L	L	D	D	W	W	D	L	D	W	L	L	L	L	L	D	W	L	D	L	L	D	L	D	L	D	L	W	L	L	D	D
Chrobry	D	L	W	L	L	L	W	W	W	D	W	D	L	W	W	W	W	D	L	W	L	L	L	D	L	D	D	L	L	D	D	W	D	W
GKS Katowice	W	D	L	W	L	D	W	L	W	D	D	W	W	D	D	L	W	L	D	D	L	L	D	L	D	L	W	W	L	D	D	D	W	D
GKS Tychy	D	L	W	L	L	W	W	D	L	W	D	L	W	L	L	W	D	D	D	L	L	W	L	L	W	D	L	L	W	W	D	L	D	L
Górnik	L	D	L	D	D	L	L	W	L	D	D	W	L	W	D	L	W	D	L	W	L	D	W	D	W	D	L	W	L	D	W	D	D	L
ŁKS	L	W	W	W	W	L	W	L	W	D	D	D	D	W	W	W	W	W	D	W	W	L	W	D	W	D	D	W	L	W	L	W	D	W
Odra	L	L	L	L	W	D	W	L	L	L	W	D	L	L	D	W	L	L	D	W	L	W	L	D	L	W	W	D	W	L	W	L	D	L
Podbeskidzie	L	W	W	W	L	W	L	L	L	W	D	D	W	D	D	W	D	D	D	D	W	L	W	D	D	D	W	L	D	D	L	L	W	W
Puszcza	W	W	L	W	L	D	W	D	W	W	L	W	W	D	W	W	L	D	L	L	W	W	D	D	W	L	W	D	D	W	D	W	W	L
Resovia	L	L	D	D	L	D	L	D	L	D	W	W	D	W	L	L	D	D	L	D	W	L	W	W	L	W	D	D	L	W	W	L	L	L
Ruch	D	W	W	W	D	D	L	W	W	W	D	W	D	L	D	W	D	D	W	W	W	D	W	D	L	D	L	W	W	L	W	W	L	W
Sandecja	D	D	D	D	L	D	L	D	L	L	L	L	W	L	D	L	W	D	W	D	L	L	D	W	L	D	L	L	L	L	W	L	L	D
Skra	D	W	L	L	W	W	L	D	W	L	L	L	L	L	L	L	L	W	L	L	L	W	W	L	W	L	W	D	W	L	L	L	L	L
Stal	D	L	W	L	D	W	L	W	L	W	W	L	D	W	D	L	W	D	W	L	L	W	L	D	D	W	L	W	W	W	L	D	D	W
Wisła	D	W	W	W	W	L	W	L	L	L	D	L	D	D	D	W	L	D	W	W	W	W	W	W	W	L	W	L	W	L	W	W	L	W
Zagłębie	W	D	W	L	W	L	L	D	W	L	D	D	W	D	D	L	L	D	L	L	W	L	L	D	D	L	W	D	W	L	W	D	W	D

Source: 90minut.pl
W = Win; D = Draw; L = Loss

== Promotion play-offs ==
I liga play-offs for the 2022–23 season will be played on 6 and 11 June 2023. The teams who finished in 3rd, 4th, 5th and 6th place are set to compete. The fixtures are determined by final league position – 3rd team of regular season vs 6th team of regular season and 4th team of regular season vs 5th team of regular season. The winner of final match will be promoted to the Ekstraklasa for next season. All matches will be played in a stadiums of team which occupied higher position in regular season.

Semi-finals; 6 June 2023
3	Bruk-Bet Termalica Nieciecza	2
6	Stal Rzeszów	0
4	Wisła Kraków	1
5	Puszcza Niepołomice	4

Final; 11 June 2023
3	Bruk-Bet Termalica Nieciecza	2
5	Puszcza Niepołomice	3

=== Matches ===
==== Semi-finals ====
6 June 2023
21:00 CEST

Bruk-Bet Termalica Nieciecza	2–0	Stal Rzeszów
Biedrzycki 19'; Mešanović 54'	Report

Stadion Bruk-Bet, Nieciecza
Attendance: 4,112
Referee: Krzysztof Jakubik (Siedlce)
6 June 2023
18:00 CEST

Wisła Kraków	1–4	Puszcza Niepołomice
Mula 84'	Report	Zapolnik 33'; Sołowiej 45+3'; Klisiewicz 90+1', 90+4'

Stadion im. Henryka Reymana, Kraków
Attendance: 23,989
Referee: Piotr Lasyk (Bytom)

==== Final ====
11 June 2023
18:00 CEST

Bruk-Bet Termalica Nieciecza	2–3 (a.e.t.)	Puszcza Niepołomice
Poznar 46'; Mešanović 71'	Report	Siemaszko 51'; Kadlec 61' (o.g.); Stępień 99'

Stadion Bruk-Bet, Nieciecza
Attendance: 4,595
Referee: Paweł Raczkowski (Warsaw)

== Season statistics ==
=== Top goalscorers ===
Rank	Player	Club	Goals
1	(Poland) Karol Czubak	Arka Gdynia	21
2	(Spain) Luis Fernández	Wisła Kraków	20
3	(Spain) Joan Román	Podbeskidzie Bielsko-Biała	16
3	(Poland) Kamil Biliński	Podbeskidzie Bielsko-Biała	16
3	(Spain) Pirulo	ŁKS Łódź	16
6	(Poland) Daniel Szczepan	Ruch Chorzów	14
7	(Poland) Damian Michalik	Stal Rzeszów	10
7	(Poland) Marek Mróz	Resovia Rzeszów	10
9	(Serbia) Andreja Prokić	Stal Rzeszów	7
9	(Poland) Mateusz Czyżycki	GKS Tychy	7
9	(Afghanistan) Omran Haydary	Arka Gdynia	7
9	(Poland) Szymon Skrzypczak	Chojniczanka Chojnice	7
9	(Poland) Szymon Sobczak	Zagłębie Sosnowiec	7

== Awards ==
=== Monthly awards ===
==== Player of the Month ====
Month	Player	Club
July 2022	(Spain) Michał Żyro	Wisła Kraków
August 2022	(Spain) Pirulo	ŁKS Łódź
September 2022	(Afghanistan) Omran Haydary	Arka Gdynia
October 2022	(Poland) Piotr Mroziński	Puszcza Niepołomice
February 2023	(Spain) Pirulo	ŁKS Łódź
March 2023	(Spain) Luis Fernández	Wisła Kraków
April 2023	(Poland) Karol Czubak	Arka Gdynia
May 2023	(Poland) Daniel Szczepan	Ruch Chorzów

== Number of teams by region ==
Number	Region	Team(s)
6	Silesian Voivodeship	GKS Katowice, GKS Tychy, Podbeskidzie Bielsko-Biała, Ruch Chorzów, Skra Częstochowa and Zagłębie Sosnowiec
4	Lesser Poland Voivodeship	Bruk-Bet Termalica Nieciecza, Puszcza Niepołomice, Sandecja Nowy Sącz and Wisła Kraków
2	Podkarpackie Voivodeship	Resovia Rzeszów and Stal Rzeszów
2	Pomeranian Voivodeship	Arka Gdynia and Chojniczanka Chojnice
1	Lower Silesian Voivodeship	Chrobry Głogów
1	Łódź Voivodeship	ŁKS Łódź
1	Opole Voivodeship	Odra Opole
1	Lublin Voivodeship	Górnik Łęczna
0	Greater Poland Voivodeship	
0	Kuyavian-Pomeranian Voivodeship	
0	Lubusz Voivodeship	
0	Masovian Voivodeship	
0	Podlaskie Voivodeship	
0	Świętokrzyskie Voivodeship	
0	Warmian-Masurian Voivodeship	
0	West Pomeranian Voivodeship	

== See also ==
- 2022–23 Ekstraklasa
- 2022–23 II liga
- 2022–23 III liga
- 2022–23 Polish Cup
- 2022 Polish Super Cup
