= 2024–25 I liga =

77th season of the second tier football league in Poland

I liga
- Season: 2024–25
- Dates: 19 July 2024 – 25 May 2025
- Champions: Arka Gdynia (2nd title)
- Promoted: Arka Gdynia; Bruk-Bet Termalica Nieciecza; Wisła Płock
- Relegated: Kotwica Kołobrzeg; Warta Poznań; Stal Stalowa Wola
- Matches: 306
- Goals: 831 (2.72 per match)
- Top goalscorer: Ángel Rodado; Łukasz Zjawiński (23 goals each)
- Biggest home win: Ruch 6–0 Odra (29 November 2024)
- Biggest away win: Odra 0–6 Arka (6 October 2024)
- Highest scoring: Kotwica 3–4 Ruch (22 April 2025)
- Longest winning run: 6 matches Arka Gdynia; GKS Tychy
- Longest unbeaten run: 17 matches Arka Gdynia
- Longest winless run: 15 matches Warta Poznań
- Longest losing run: 7 matches Warta Poznań
- Highest attendance: 53,293 (Note: Match played at the Silesian Stadium in Chorzów.); Ruch 0–5 Wisła K. (22 February 2025)
- Lowest attendance: 0 (Note: Match played behind closed doors without any spectators.); Wisła P. 2–2 Górnik (10 November 2024)
- Total attendance: 1,364,253
- Average attendance: 4,458 ▲0.7%

The 2024–25 I liga (also known as Betclic I liga for sponsorship reasons) was the 77th season of the second tier domestic division in the Polish football league system since its establishment in 1949 and the 17th season of the Polish I liga under its current title. The league is operated by the PZPN.

== Season overview ==
The season started on 19 July 2024 and went into the winter break after the 19th matchday on 9 December. It resumed with the 20th matchday on 14 February 2025 and concluded with the final 34th matchday on 25 May 2025.

The regular season was played as a round-robin tournament. A total of 18 teams took part, 12 of which had already competed in the league during the previous season, while three were relegated from the 2023–24 Ekstraklasa and three were promoted from the 2023–24 II liga. Each team played a total of 34 matches, half at home and half away.

== Teams ==
A total of 18 teams participated in the 2024–25 edition of the I liga.

=== Changes from last season ===
The following teams have changed division since the 2023–24 season.

==== To I liga ====
Relegated from 2023–24 Ekstraklasa	Promoted from 2023–24 II liga
▼ Warta Poznań (16th) ▼ Ruch Chorzów (17th) ▼ ŁKS Łódź (18th)	▲ Pogoń Siedlce (1st) ▲ Kotwica Kołobrzeg (2nd) ▲ Stal Stalowa Wola (PO)

==== From I liga ====
Promoted to 2024–25 Ekstraklasa	Relegated to 2024–25 II liga
▲ Lechia Gdańsk (1st) ▲GKS Katowice (2nd) ▲ Motor Lublin (PO)	▼ Resovia Rzeszów (16th) ▼ Podbeskidzie Bielsko-Biała (17th) ▼ Zagłębie Sosnowiec (18th)

=== Stadiums and locations ===
Location of teams in 2024–25 I liga.

Note: Table lists in alphabetical order.

Team	Location	Venue	Capacity
Arka Gdynia	Gdynia	GOSiR Stadium	15,139
Bruk-Bet Termalica Nieciecza	Nieciecza	Bruk-Bet Stadium	4,666
Chrobry Głogów	Głogów	GOS Stadium	2,817
GKS Tychy	Tychy	Tychy Stadium	15,150
Górnik Łęczna	Łęczna	Łęczna Stadium	7,464
Kotwica Kołobrzeg	Kołobrzeg	Sebastian Karpiniuk Stadium	3,014
ŁKS Łódź	Łódź	Władysław Król Stadium	18,029
Miedź Legnica	Legnica	White Eagle Stadium	6,864
Odra Opole	Opole	Odra Stadium; Itaka Arena^{1}	4,560; 11,600
Pogoń Siedlce	Siedlce	Municipal Stadium	2,901
Polonia Warsaw	Warsaw	Kazimierz Sosnkowski Stadium	7,150
Ruch Chorzów	Chorzów	Silesian Stadium^{2}	54,378
Stal Rzeszów	Rzeszów	Municipal Stadium	11,547
Stal Stalowa Wola	Stalowa Wola	Subcarpathian Football Center	3,764
Warta Poznań	Poznań	Respect Energy Stadium^{3}	5,383
Wisła Kraków	Kraków	Henryk Reyman Stadium	33,326
Wisła Płock	Płock	Kazimierz Górski Orlen Stadium	15,004
Znicz Pruszków	Pruszków	MZOS Stadium	1,977

1. Odra moved to Itaka Arena in March 2025.
2. Since 28 October 2023 Ruch Chorzów played their matches at Silesian Stadium. It remains unclear if they will stay there or they will move to Ruch Chorzów Stadium.
3. Due to the renovation of Dębińska Road Stadium in Poznań, Warta had to play their matches at Respect Energy Stadium in Grodzisk Wielkopolski since 2020. Even though on 29 April 2024, Enea Stadion offered Warta to play their matches for the 2024–25 season, on 19 June they ultimately decided to remain in Grodzisk Wielkopolski with hopes to return to Dębińska Road Stadium.

== League table ==
Pos	Team	Pld	W	D	L	GF	GA	GD	Pts	Promotion or Relegation
1	Arka Gdynia (C, P)	34	21	9	4	63	24	+39	72	Promotion to Ekstraklasa
2	Bruk-Bet Termalica Nieciecza (P)	34	21	8	5	70	39	+31	71	Promotion to Ekstraklasa
3	Wisła Płock (O, P)	34	18	10	6	58	38	+20	64	Qualification for the promotion play-offs
4	Wisła Kraków	34	18	8	8	63	32	+31	62	Qualification for the promotion play-offs
5	Miedź Legnica	34	16	8	10	56	45	+11	56 (Note: Ranked based on goal difference: Miedź Legnica +11, Polonia Warsaw +9.)	Qualification for the promotion play-offs
6	Polonia Warsaw	34	16	8	10	46	37	+9	56	Qualification for the promotion play-offs
7	GKS Tychy	34	13	14	7	47	36	+11	53	
8	Znicz Pruszków	34	14	10	10	52	43	+9	52	
9	Górnik Łęczna	34	13	11	10	50	42	+8	50	
10	Ruch Chorzów	34	13	9	12	50	46	+4	48	
11	ŁKS Łódź	34	13	8	13	50	41	+9	47	
12	Stal Rzeszów	34	9	8	17	42	59	−17	35	
13	Chrobry Głogów	34	8	9	17	37	59	−22	33	
14	Odra Opole	34	7	9	18	31	61	−30	30 (Note: Ranked based on head-to-head points: Odra Opole 6 pts, Pogoń Siedlce 0 pts.)	
15	Pogoń Siedlce	34	7	9	18	38	53	−15	30	
16	Kotwica Kołobrzeg (Note: MKP Kotwica were denied a license to compete in the 2025–26 II liga. Then they ceased its activities and was not registered at any league level in the following season. At the same time, MKS Kotwica appeared in the regional league, but it is a different legal entity, even though supporters refer to it as the continuation of the club’s traditions.) (R)	34	6	11	17	29	55	−26	29	Relegation, then dissolution
17	Warta Poznań (R)	34	6	6	22	22	56	−34	24	Relegation to II liga
18	Stal Stalowa Wola (R)	34	4	11	19	27	65	−38	23	Relegation to II liga

Source: 1liga.org, 90minut.pl
Rules for classification: 1) Points; 2) Head-to-head points; 3) Head-to-head goal difference; 4) Goal difference; 6) Goals scored; 7) Number of wins; 8) Number of away wins.
(Note: Head-to-head record is used only after all the matches between the teams in question have been played)
(C) Champions; (O) Play-off winner; (P) Promoted; (R) Relegated

== Positions by round ==
Note: The place taken by the team that played fewer matches than the opponents was underlined. (Note: The list of postponed matches: ŁKS Łódź – Wisła Kraków (1st round, played on 17 September 2024); Górnik Łęczna – Wisła Kraków (6th round, played on 22 October 2024); Wisła Kraków – Miedź Legnica (7th round, played on 12 December 2024); Chrobry Głogów – Wisła Kraków (10th round, played on 16 November 2024); Odra Opole – Znicz Pruszków (10th round, played on 2 October 2024); Odra Opole – Stal Rzeszów (24th round, played on 23 April 2025))

Team ╲ Round	1	2	3	4	5	6	7	8	9	10	11	12	13	14	15	16	17	18	19	20	21	22	23	24	25	26	27	28	29	30	31	32	33	34
Arka Gdynia	14	8	5	6	6	7	8	6	6	4	4	3	3	4	3	3	2	2	2	2	2	2	1	1	1	1	1	1	1	1	1	1	1	1
Bruk-Bet Termalica Nieciecza	1	1	1	1	1	1	1	1	1	1	1	1	1	1	1	1	1	1	1	1	1	1	2	2	2	2	2	2	2	2	2	2	2	2
Wisła Płock	9	5	2	3	3	5	4	3	2	2	2	2	2	3	4	4	4	5	5	5	4	4	3	4	4	3	3	3	3	3	3	3	3	3
Wisła Kraków	11	13	14	10	10	12	13	14	16	16	13	12	11	10	11	9	6	6	7	7	6	7	5	6	6	6	6	6	5	5	5	5	4	4
Miedź Legnica	7	3	9	7	5	3	5	5	4	3	5	4	4	2	2	2	3	3	3	3	3	3	4	3	3	4	4	5	4	4	4	4	5	5
Polonia Warsaw	14	14	17	17	18	18	16	13	11	8	10	11	10	11	10	11	10	11	8	9	8	6	7	5	5	5	5	4	6	6	6	6	6	6
GKS Tychy	7	11	10	11	11	8	9	11	12	12	12	13	14	15	15	15	14	13	12	12	12	11	11	12	10	8	8	8	8	8	8	8	8	7
Znicz Pruszków	4	6	4	5	8	9	6	7	9	11	8	8	8	9	9	10	11	10	11	8	10	10	9	8	9	10	9	9	10	10	10	10	9	8
Górnik Łęczna	4	2	3	2	2	4	3	4	5	7	6	7	7	6	7	8	9	7	6	6	7	8	10	11	8	7	7	7	7	7	7	7	7	9
Ruch Chorzów	2	4	7	8	9	10	12	10	8	9	11	9	9	8	5	5	5	4	4	4	5	5	6	7	7	9	10	10	9	9	9	9	11	10
ŁKS Łódź	11	15	13	15	15	14	11	9	7	6	7	6	6	5	6	6	7	8	9	10	11	12	12	9	11	11	11	11	11	11	11	11	10	11
Stal Rzeszów	6	8	6	4	4	2	2	2	3	5	3	5	5	7	8	7	8	9	10	11	9	9	8	10	12	12	12	12	12	12	12	12	12	12
Chrobry Głogów	3	10	12	13	12	13	14	16	14	14	15	14	16	13	16	16	16	15	16	16	16	13	13	14	15	13	13	13	13	14	15	14	13	13
Odra Opole	17	7	11	14	13	11	10	12	13	13	16	16	15	16	14	14	13	16	14	14	14	16	16	16	13	14	14	14	14	13	14	13	14	14
Pogoń Siedlce	13	17	15	16	16	16	15	15	17	17	17	18	18	18	18	18	18	18	18	18	18	18	18	18	18	17	17	17	18	17	16	16	16	15
Kotwica Kołobrzeg	9	12	7	8	7	6	7	8	10	10	9	10	12	12	13	13	15	14	15	15	15	15	14	13	14	15	16	15	15	15	13	15	15	16
Warta Poznań	18	18	16	12	14	15	17	17	15	15	14	15	13	14	12	12	12	12	13	13	13	14	15	15	16	16	15	16	16	16	18	18	17	17
Stal Stalowa Wola	14	16	18	18	17	16	18	18	18	18	18	17	17	17	17	17	17	17	17	17	17	17	17	17	17	18	18	18	17	18	17	17	18	18

Promotion to Ekstraklasa
Qualification for promotion play-offs
Relegation to II liga

Source: 90minut.pl

== Results ==
Home \ Away	ARK	BBT	CHG	TYC	GKŁ	KOT	ŁKS	MLE	ODO	PSI	PWA	RCH	STR	SSW	WAR	WKR	WPŁ	ZNI
Arka Gdynia	—	2–1	2–0	2–2	1–2	5–0	2–1	2–0	1–0	2–1	0–0	1–1	2–1	5–1	3–0	2–2	2–0	1–1
Bruk-Bet Termalica Nieciecza	2–1	—	3–2	2–1	3–1	2–1	2–2	1–1	3–0	1–1	0–3	1–1	3–1	3–0	3–0	2–2	4–2	1–2
Chrobry Głogów	2–2	0–4	—	0–0	1–1	3–2	1–2	1–1	1–1	1–0	1–2	2–2	1–3	2–0	2–1	0–3	0–0	3–2
GKS Tychy	1–1	0–2	3–1	—	3–1	4–0	0–3	2–2	0–0	2–0	1–1	0–1	1–0	0–0	1–1	0–2	2–1	1–1
Górnik Łęczna	0–1	0–2	1–0	2–2	—	3–0 (Note: The match was officially recorded as walkover for Górnik Łęczna. The visiting team exceeded the limit of non-EU players. The result on the pitch was 0-0.)	2–2	1–2	2–2	1–3	3–1	2–0	2–1	2–0	1–1	1–0	2–2	1–2
Kotwica Kołobrzeg	0–1	0–5	2–1	0–0	1–1	—	0–0	0–0	0–1	1–1	1–0	3–4	1–3	1–1	0–1	1–1	2–0	0–0
ŁKS Łódź	0–2	1–2	3–0	1–3	1–1	0–2	—	0–1	1–2	2–0	0–0	0–1	5–0	0–0	3–1	3–1	0–1	2–3
Miedź Legnica	1–2	1–4	1–0	1–3	0–2	1–1	1–0	—	2–1	4–1	2–3	3–0	3–3	4–2	3–2	2–1	2–2	4–0
Odra Opole	0–6	2–2	0–2	1–5	0–0	4–2	0–1	0–2	—	4–1	0–1	0–2	3–0	2–1	0–0	1–2	1–2	1–1
Pogoń Siedlce	1–1	1–2	1–2	0–1	1–1	2–1	1–1	3–0	0–1	—	2–4	1–1	1–1	0–0	2–1	1–3	1–3	2–1
Polonia Warsaw	0–3	0–1	4–2	2–1	2–1	2–2	0–1	0–1	3–0	2–1	—	1–0	1–0	2–3	2–0	2–0	0–0	0–1
Ruch Chorzów	0–1	2–2	5–0	0–1	3–2	1–0	1–3	1–2	6–0	1–1	1–1	—	3–0	1–3	2–1	0–5	0–0	0–0
Stal Rzeszów	1–0	1–2	0–0	5–1	0–3	1–0	2–4	1–0	2–2	2–4	1–2	0–2	—	2–2	4–0	0–3	0–1	2–1
Stal Stalowa Wola	0–3	3–3	1–1	0–1	0–1	0–2	0–1	0–2	0–0	1–3	1–1	2–0	2–2	—	0–0	1–5	1–3	0–5
Warta Poznań	0–1	0–1	1–0	1–3	0–2	0–1	2–4	1–4	1–0	2–1	1–2	0–2	0–1	1–0	—	0–1	1–2	1–1
Wisła Kraków	2–2	2–0	2–1	0–0	1–0	2–1	2–1	1–1	5–0	1–0	0–0	3–1	1–1	5–0	0–1	—	1–3	0–1
Wisła Płock	1–0	3–0	2–1	0–0	2–2	1–1	3–0	2–1	2–1	1–0	4–1	3–2	1–1	2–1	4–0	1–3	—	2–3
Znicz Pruszków	0–1	0–1	2–3	2–2	2–3	4–0	2–2	2–1	2–1	1–0	2–1	2–3	2–0	0–1	0–0	2–1	2–2	—

Source: 1liga.org, 90minut.pl
Legend: Blue = home team win; Yellow = draw; Red = away team win.
For upcoming matches, an "a" indicates there is an article about the rivalry between the two participants.

== Results by round ==
Team ╲ Round	1	2	3	4	5	6	7	8	9	10	11	12	13	14	15	16	17	18	19	20	21	22	23	24	25	26	27	28	29	30	31	32	33	34
Arka Gdynia	L	W	W	D	D	D	L	W	W	W	W	W	W	L	W	D	W	W	W	D	W	D	W	W	W	W	W	D	W	D	W	L	D	W
Bruk-Bet Termalica Nieciecza	W	W	W	W	D	W	W	W	W	D	W	L	L	W	W	D	W	W	W	D	D	D	L	W	D	W	W	L	W	D	L	W	W	W
Chrobry Głogów	W	L	L	D	D	L	L	L	W	L	D	L	W	L	L	L	D	W	L	D	L	W	D	L	L	W	L	D	L	D	L	W	D	W
GKS Tychy	D	D	D	D	D	W	L	D	L	D	L	L	L	D	D	D	D	W	W	W	W	W	W	L	W	W	W	W	W	D	D	L	D	W
Górnik Łęczna	W	W	D	W	W	W	L	L	D	D	D	D	W	D	L	D	D	W	W	D	L	L	L	L	W	W	W	W	W	D	L	L	D	L
Kotwica Kołobrzeg	D	D	W	L	W	W	L	D	L	D	D	L	L	L	L	L	L	W	L	D	L	D	D	D	L	L	L	D	L	W	W	L	D	L
ŁKS Łódź	L	D	L	L	W	W	W	W	W	D	L	W	D	W	L	D	D	L	L	D	L	D	W	W	L	D	L	L	L	W	W	W	W	L
Miedź Legnica	D	W	L	W	W	W	L	W	W	D	W	W	W	W	D	D	L	W	D	D	W	L	L	W	L	L	W	D	W	D	W	L	L	L
Odra Opole	L	W	L	L	D	W	D	L	L	L	D	L	D	L	W	D	D	L	W	D	L	L	D	W	L	L	L	L	W	D	L	W	L	L
Pogoń Siedlce	L	L	D	L	L	L	W	D	L	L	L	L	L	D	L	W	L	L	L	D	D	L	L	D	W	D	L	W	L	D	W	W	D	W
Polonia Warsaw	L	D	L	L	L	L	W	W	W	W	L	L	W	D	W	D	W	L	W	D	W	W	D	W	W	W	W	W	D	D	L	W	L	D
Ruch Chorzów	W	D	D	L	D	D	L	W	W	L	L	W	W	W	W	W	L	W	W	D	L	D	L	D	L	L	L	L	W	W	W	L	D	D
Stal Rzeszów	W	L	W	W	W	W	D	D	L	D	W	D	L	L	L	W	D	L	L	D	W	W	D	L	L	L	L	D	L	L	L	L	L	L
Stal Stalowa Wola	L	L	L	L	D	L	L	L	L	D	W	D	D	D	W	L	L	L	L	D	D	L	D	D	D	L	L	W	D	L	W	L	L	L
Warta Poznań	L	L	D	W	L	L	L	D	W	L	D	L	W	L	W	D	W	L	L	L	D	L	L	L	D	L	L	L	L	L	L	L	W	L
Wisła Kraków	D	L	W	D	D	L	L	W	W	W	L	W	D	W	W	D	W	L	D	L	W	D	W	L	W	W	W	W	W	D	L	W	W	W
Wisła Płock	D	W	W	W	W	L	W	D	W	D	W	W	D	L	L	D	D	L	W	D	W	W	W	D	L	W	W	W	D	L	W	W	D	W
Znicz Pruszków	W	D	W	D	L	L	W	D	L	W	D	W	D	D	L	L	D	W	L	W	L	W	W	D	D	L	W	L	L	W	D	W	W	W

Source: 1liga.org, 90minut.pl
W = Win; D = Draw; L = Loss

== Promotion play-offs ==
I liga play-offs final for the 2024–25 season was played on 1 June 2025. The teams who finished in 3rd, 4th, 5th and 6th place were set to compete. The fixtures were determined by final league position – 3rd team of regular season vs 6th team of regular season and 4th team of regular season vs 5th team of regular season. The winner of final match has been promoted to the Ekstraklasa for next season. All matches were played in a stadiums of team which occupied higher position in regular season.

Semi-finals; 29 May 2025
3	Wisła Płock	2
6	Polonia Warsaw	1
4	Wisła Kraków	0
5	Miedź Legnica	1

Final; 1 June 2025
3	Wisła Płock	2
5	Miedź Legnica	0

=== Matches ===
==== Semi-finals ====
29 May 2025
18:00 CEST (UTC+02:00)

Wisła Płock	2–1	Polonia Warsaw
Edmundsson 34'; Pacheco 89'	Łączy nas piłka 90minut	Vega 4'

Kazimierz Górski Stadium, Płock
Attendance: 8,994
Referee: Piotr Lasyk (Bytom)
29 May 2025
21:00 CEST (UTC+02:00)

Wisła Kraków	0–1	Miedź Legnica
	Łączy nas piłka 90minut	Kostka 36'

Henryk Reyman Municipal Stadium, Kraków
Attendance: 33,000
Referee: Bartosz Frankowski (Toruń)

==== Final ====
1 June 2025
16:30 CEST (UTC+02:00)

Wisła Płock	2–0	Miedź Legnica
Sekulski 45+6' (pen.); Jime 57'	Łączy nas piłka 90minut

Kazimierz Górski Stadium, Płock
Attendance: 13,840
Referee: Wojciech Myć (Lublin)

== Season statistics ==
=== Top goalscorers ===
Rank	Player	Club	Goals
1	(Spain) Ángel Rodado	Wisła Kraków	23
1	(Poland) Łukasz Zjawiński	Polonia Warsaw	23
3	(Poland) Daniel Stanclik	Znicz Pruszków	16
4	(Poland) Przemysław Banaszak	Górnik Łęczna	15
4	(Poland) Kamil Zapolnik	Bruk-Bet Termalica Nieciecza	15
6	(Poland) Karol Czubak	Arka Gdynia	14
6	(Poland) Damian Warchoł	Górnik Łęczna	14
8	(Poland) Szymon Sobczak	Arka Gdynia	13
9	(Poland) Daniel Szczepan	Ruch Chorzów	12
10	(Spain) Jime	Wisła Płock	11
10	(Poland) Kacper Karasek	Bruk-Bet Termalica Nieciecza	11
10	(Poland) Karol Podliński	Pogoń Siedlce	11
10	(Poland) Łukasz Sekulski	Wisła Płock	11

== Attendances ==
Pos	Team	Total	High	Low	Average	Change
1	Wisła Kraków	313,132	30,275	12,301	18,420	+10.9%
2	Ruch Chorzów	221,627	53,293	5,768	13,037	−29.5%^{1}
3	Arka Gdynia	130,871	14,384	4,518	7,698	+50.7%
4	ŁKS Łódź	111,880	10,512	3,684	6,581	−32.2%^{1}
5	Wisła Płock	94,465	8,976	0	5,557	+13.0%
6	GKS Tychy	69,802	9,020	2,142	4,106	−15.7%
7	Miedź Legnica	62,369	4,768	3,019	3,669	+0.7%
8	Stal Rzeszów	60,598	5,478	1,835	3,565	+2.5%
9	Odra Opole	56,533	9,201	1,243	3,325	+43.8%
10	Stal Stalowa Wola	46,418	3,764	1,753	2,730	+34.0%^{2}
11	Bruk-Bet Termalica Nieciecza	44,900	4,666	1,116	2,641	+47.6%
12	Polonia Warsaw	39,301	4,049	1,251	2,312	+1.9%
13	Górnik Łęczna	26,958	2,166	942	1,586	−24.1%
14	Pogoń Siedlce	22,638	2,566	812	1,332	+22.0%^{2}
15	Kotwica Kołobrzeg	20,247	2,830	380	1,191	−10.8%^{2}
16	Chrobry Głogów	16,239	2,499	448	955	−18.9%
17	Warta Poznań	13,712	1,874	350	807	−78.7%^{1}
18	Znicz Pruszków	12,563	1,423	307	739	−25.7%
	League total	1,364,253	53,293	0	4,458	+0.7%

Source: 90minut.pl
Notes:
1. Team played last season in Ekstraklasa.
2. Team played last season in II liga.

== Awards ==
=== Monthly awards ===
==== Player of the Month ====
Month	Player	Club
July & August 2024	(Spain) Ángel Rodado	Wisła Kraków
September 2024	(Poland) Karol Czubak	Arka Gdynia
October 2024	(Austria) Stefan Feiertag	ŁKS Łódź
November & December 2024	(Poland) Bartłomiej Barański	Ruch Chorzów
February & March 2025	(Poland) Łukasz Zjawiński	Polonia Warsaw
April 2025	(Austria) Julius Ertlthaler	GKS Tychy
May 2025	(Poland) Marcin Flis	Pogoń Siedlce

==== Coach of the Month ====
Month	Coach	Club
July & August 2024	(Poland) Marcin Brosz	Bruk-Bet Termalica
September 2024	(Poland) Marcin Brosz	Bruk-Bet Termalica
October 2024	(Poland) Ireneusz Mamrot	Miedź Legnica
November & December 2024	(Poland) Dawid Szulczek	Ruch Chorzów
February & March 2025	(Poland) Artur Skowronek	GKS Tychy
April 2025	(Poland) Artur Skowronek	GKS Tychy
May 2025	(Poland) Adam Nocoń	Pogoń Siedlce

=== Annual awards ===
Award	Player	Club
Player of the Season	(Spain) Ángel Rodado	Wisła Kraków
Assist of the Season	(Poland) Radosław Majewski	Znicz Pruszków
Move of the Season	(Poland) Maksymilian Sitek	ŁKS Łódź
Save of the Season	(Poland) Patryk Letkiewicz	Wisła Kraków
Play of the Season	Stal Stalowa Wola	
Goal of the Season	(Poland) Bartosz Śpiączka	GKS Tychy

== See also ==
- 2024–25 Ekstraklasa
- 2024–25 II liga
- 2024–25 III liga
- 2024–25 Polish Cup
- 2024 Polish Super Cup
