= 2024–25 GKS Tychy season =

GKS Tychy
2024–25 season
- Manager: Dariusz Banasik
- Stadium: Tychy Stadium
- I liga: 9th
- Polish Cup: Pre-season
- Highest home attendance: 4,231 vs Miedź Legnica
Home colours	Away colours

The 2024–25 season is the 54th season in the history of GKS Tychy, and the club's ninth consecutive season in I liga. In addition to the domestic league, the team is scheduled to participate in the Polish Cup.

== Transfers ==
=== In ===
Pos.	Player	Transferred to	Fee	Date	Source
FW	(The Gambia) Mamin Sanyang	(Germany) Hannover 96 II U23	Undisclosed	5 July 2024	

== Friendlies ==
22 June 2024 Friendly	GKS Tychy (Poland)	v	(Poland) Podbeskidzie Bielsko-Biała
14:00

27 June 2024 Friendly	GKS Tychy (Poland)	2–1	(Poland) Rekord Bielsko-Biała
16:00

29 June 2024 Friendly	MFK Karviná (Czech Republic)	1–0	(Poland) GKS Tychy
17:00	Mikuš 34'

5 July 2024 Friendly	GKS Tychy (Poland)	3–2	(Poland) Termalica Nieciecza
11:00	Śpiączka 27'; Nedić (yellow card) 14' (yellow-red card) 34'; Sanyang 68'; Dzięgielewski 71'		43'; 50'

10 July 2024 Friendly	GKS Tychy (Poland)	2–0	(Poland) Wiślanie Skawina
11:00				Attendance: 0

3 August 2024 Friendly	Górnik Zabrze (Poland)	3–1	(Poland) GKS Tychy	Zabrze
11:00				Stadium: boczne boisko Górnika
Note: Two periods of 35 minutes

7 September 2024 Friendly	Śląsk Wrocław (Poland)	2–2	(Poland) GKS Tychy	Wrocław
12:00	Basse 46'; Mateusz Bartolewski 85'	Report	Sanyang 36'; Teo Kurtaran (yellow card) 39'; Wiktor Niewiarowski 89'	Stadium: Wrocław Stadium

12 October 2024 Friendly	GKS Tychy (Poland)	3–0	(Czech Republic) Opava	Tychy
11:00	Tobiasz Kubik 17'; Daniel Rumin 20'; Śpiączka 50'	Report		Stadium: Stadion Miejski

18 January 2025 Friendly	Polonia Bytom (Poland)	3–1	(Poland) GKS Tychy	Bytom
11:30	Kamil Wojtyra 14' (pen.) 27'; Ściślak 73'	Report	Ertlthaler 50'	Stadium: Polonia Bytom Stadium

25 January 2025 Friendly	Unia Tarnów (Poland)	0–4	(Poland) GKS Tychy	Tarnów
10:00		Report	Śpiączka 13'; Daniel Rumin 31' 79'; Bartosz Mrozek 45+1'	Stadium: Jaskółcze Gniazdo Municipal Stadium

25 January 2025 Friendly	GKS Tychy (Poland)	5–0	(Poland) Igloopol Dębica	Tychy
12:00	Bieroński 12'; Julian Keiblinger 18'; Ertlthaler 34'; Tobiasz Kubik 88'; Maksymilian Stangret 89'	Report		Stadium: Stadion Miejski

29 January 2025 Friendly	GKS Tychy (Poland)	0–0	(Poland) Rekord Bielsko-Biała	Tychy
12:00		Report		Stadium: Stadion Miejski

1 February 2025 Friendly	GKS Tychy (Poland)	3–2	(Poland) Zagłębie Sosnowiec	Tychy
12:00	Bieroński 26'; Ertlthaler 40' (pen.); Julian Keiblinger 63'	Report	Bartosz Snopczyński 67' 79'	Stadium: Stadion Miejski

8 February 2025 Friendly	ŁKS Łódź (Poland)	0–0	(Poland) GKS Tychy	Łódź
13:00		Report		Stadium: Stadion Miejski ŁKS Łódź

9 February 2025 Friendly	GKS Tychy (Poland)	3–1	(Poland) Podlesianka Katowice	Tychy
13:00		Report		Stadium: Stadion Miejski

== Competitions ==
=== Overall record ===
Competition	First match	Last match	Starting round	Record							
Competition	First match	Last match	Starting round	Pld	W	D	L	GF	GA	GD	Win %
I liga	21 July 2024	25–26 May 2025	Matchday 1	6	1	5	0	4	3	+1	16.67
Polish Cup	24 September 2024			0	0	0	0	0	0	+0	—
Total				6	1	5	0	4	3	+1	16.67

Last updated: 21 August 2024
Source: Soccerway

=== I liga ===
==== League table ====
Pos	Team	Pld	W	D	L	GF	GA	GD	Pts	Promotion or Relegation
5	Miedź Legnica	34	16	8	10	56	45	+11	56 (Note: Ranked based on goal difference: Miedź Legnica +11, Polonia Warsaw +9.)	Qualification for the promotion play-offs
6	Polonia Warsaw	34	16	8	10	46	37	+9	56	Qualification for the promotion play-offs
7	GKS Tychy	34	13	14	7	47	36	+11	53	
8	Znicz Pruszków	34	14	10	10	52	43	+9	52	
9	Górnik Łęczna	34	13	11	10	50	42	+8	50	

Source: 1liga.org, 90minut.pl
Rules for classification: 1) Points; 2) Head-to-head points; 3) Head-to-head goal difference; 4) Goal difference; 6) Goals scored; 7) Number of wins; 8) Number of away wins.
(Note: Head-to-head record is used only after all the matches between the teams in question have been played)
Notes:

Semi-finals; 29 May 2025
3	Wisła Płock	2
6	Polonia Warsaw	1
4	Wisła Kraków	0
5	Miedź Legnica	1

Final; 1 June 2025
3	Wisła Płock	2
5	Miedź Legnica	0

==== Results summary ====
Overall								Home						Away					
Pld	W	D	L	GF	GA	GD	Pts	W	D	L	GF	GA	GD	W	D	L	GF	GA	GD
6	1	5	0	4	3	+1	8	0	3	0	3	3	0	1	2	0	1	0	+1

Last updated: 21 August 2024.

==== Results by round ====
Round	1	2	3
Ground	H	A	H
Result	D	D	D
Position	7		

Updated to match(es) played on 2 August 2024. Source:
A = Away; H = Home; W = Win; D = Draw; L = Loss

==== Matches ====
The match schedule was released on 12 June 2024.

21 July 2024 1	GKS Tychy	2–2	Miedź Legnica	Tychy
14:30	Makowski 57'; Śpiączka 89'		Mioč 35'; Hartherz 85'	Stadium: Tychy Stadium; Attendance: 4,231; Referee: Marcin Kochanek

26 July 2024 2	Kotwica Kołobrzeg	0–0	GKS Tychy	Kołobrzeg
20:00				Stadium: Stadion im. Sebastiana Karpiniuka w Kołobrzegu; Referee: Sylwester Rasmus

2 August 2024 3	GKS Tychy	1–1	Warta Poznań	Tychy
18:00	Żytek 39'; Budnicki (yellow card) 72' (yellow-red card) 90+10'		Firlej 90'	Stadium: Tychy Stadium; Referee: Paweł Pskit

9 August 2024 4	Chrobry Głogów	0–0	GKS Tychy	Głogów
18:00 CEST	Szymon Bartlewicz (yellow card) 90+5'	Report	Ertlthaler (yellow card) 56'	Stadium: Stadion GOS; Referee: (Poland) Piotr Rzucidło

17 August 2024 5	GKS Tychy	0–0	Odra Opole	Tychy
19:30 CEST	Błachewicz (yellow card) 11'; Hołownia (yellow card) 52' (yellow-red card) 79'	Report	Purzycki (yellow card) 32'; Łyszczarz (yellow card) 54'; Pikk (yellow card) 60'	Stadium: Tychy Stadium; Attendance: 3,459; Referee: (Poland) Łukasz Szczech

21 August 2024 6	Pogoń Siedlce	0–1	GKS Tychy	Siedlce
20:30 CEST	Ernest Dzięcioł (yellow card) 22'; Lukáš Hrnčiar (yellow card) 44'; Zinkevych (yellow card) 45+2'; Krzyżak (yellow card) 50'	Report	Jakub Budnicki 27'; Jakub Tecław (yellow card) 45+2'; Daniel Rumin (yellow card) 81'; Hołownia (yellow card) 90+4'	Stadium: ROSRRiT Stadium; Attendance: 1,168; Referee: (Poland) Sylwester Rasmus

24 August 2024 7	GKS Tychy	0–2	Nieciecza	Tychy
19:30 CEST	Jakub Budnicki (yellow card) 8'; Sanyang (yellow card) 89' (red card) 90+3'	Report	Damian Hilbrycht 39'; Faßbender 84'; Wolski (yellow card) 89'	Stadium: Tychy Stadium; Attendance: 2,750; Referee: (Poland) Tomasz Kwiatkowski

31 August 2024 8	Wisła Płock	0–0	GKS Tychy	Płock
17:00 CEST	Maciej Famulak (yellow card) 14'; Szymański (yellow card) 76'; Oskar Tomczyk (yellow card) 90+7'	Report	Nemanja Nedić (yellow card) 41'; Teo Kurtaran (yellow card) 70'; Dijakovic (yellow card) 90'; Śpiączka (yellow card) 90'; Maksymilian Dziuba (yellow card) 90+7'	Stadium: Orlen Stadion; Attendance: 5,326; Referee: (Poland) Piotr Urban

16 September 2024 9	GKS Tychy	0–1	Ruch Chorzów	Tychy
19:00 CEST	Hołownia (yellow card) 20'; Dijakovic (yellow card) 28'; Nemanja Nedić (yellow card) 65'; Ertlthaler (yellow card) 80'; Teo Kurtaran (yellow card) 83'	Report	Moneta 44'; Sadlok (yellow card) 89'; Szwoch (yellow card) 90'	Stadium: Tychy Stadium; Attendance: 9,020; Referee: (Poland) Paweł Malec

22 September 2024 10	GKS Tychy	0–0	Stal Stalowa Wola	Tychy
17:00 CEST	Ertlthaler (yellow card) 47'; Maksymilian Dziuba (yellow card) 52'	Report	Jakub Banach (yellow card) 14'; Ruszel (yellow card) 55'; Wojtkowski (yellow card) 67'; Łukasz Furtak (yellow card) 90'	Stadium: Tychy Stadium; Attendance: 2,950; Referee: (Poland) Łukasz Szczech

30 September 2024 11	Stal Rzeszów	5–1	GKS Tychy	Rzeszów
18:00 CEST	Marcin Kaczor 18'; Oleksy (yellow card) 39'; Patryk Warczak 43'; Nemanja Nedić 45' (o.g.); Krystian Wachowiak 51'; Szymon Łyczko 64'	Report	Maksymilian Dziuba 15'; Marcin Szpakowski (yellow card) 73'	Stadium: Stal Rzeszów Municipal Stadium; Attendance: 2,812; Referee: (Poland) Damian Krumplewski

6 October 2024 12	GKS Tychy	0–3	ŁKS Łódź	Tychy
17:00 CET	Tobiasz Kubik (yellow card) 83'; Ertlthaler (yellow card) 90'	Report	Feiertag 33'; Pirulo 35'; Wiech (yellow card) 45'; Andreu Arasa 51'; Tutyškinas (yellow card) 86'	Stadium: Tychy Stadium; Attendance: 4,183; Referee: (Poland) Paweł Raczkowski

20 October 2024 13	Polonia Warsaw	2–1	GKS Tychy	Warsaw
11:00 CET	Zjawiński 13' (pen.) 60'; Nikodem Zawistowski (yellow card) 18'; Wojciechowski (yellow card) 23'; Terpiłowski (yellow card) 37'; Dani Vega (yellow card) 43'; Michał Grudniewski (yellow card) 45+1'	Report	Julian Keiblinger 28'; Bieroński (yellow card) 31'; Hołownia (yellow card) 40'; Nemanja Nedić (yellow card) 41'; Tobiasz Kubik (yellow card) 72'; Dijakovic (yellow card) 90+5'	Stadium: General Kazimierz Sosnkowski Municipal Stadium; Attendance: 2,981; Referee: (Poland) Grzegorz Kawałko

28 October 2024 14	GKS Tychy	1–1	Znicz Pruszków	Tychy
18:00 CET	Jakub Budnicki 77'; Julian Keiblinger (yellow card) 87'; Nemanja Nedić (red card) 88'	Report	Daniel Stanclik 3' (pen.); Sokół (yellow card) 33' (yellow-red card) 72'; Majewski (yellow card) 70'	Stadium: Tychy Stadium; Attendance: 2,142; Referee: (Poland) Tomasz Marciniak

4 November 2024 15	Wisła Kraków	0–0	GKS Tychy	Kraków
18:00 CET	Mariusz Kutwa (yellow card) 90+1'	Report	Julian Keiblinger (yellow card) 68'; Ertlthaler (yellow card) 87'; Jakub Budnicki (yellow card) 90+3'	Stadium: Henryk Reyman Municipal Stadium; Attendance: 16,161; Referee: (Poland) Piotr Rzucidło

9 November 2024 16	GKS Tychy	1–1	Arka Gdynia	Tychy
13:30 CET	Jakub Budnicki 18' (yellow card) 90+2'; Bieroński (yellow card) 37'	Report	Kike Hermoso (yellow card) 5'; Czubak 28'; Gaprindashvili (yellow card) 55'; João Oliveira (yellow card) 74'	Stadium: Stadion Miejski; Attendance: 3,070; Referee: (Poland) Sylwester Rasmus

23 November 2024 17	Górnik Łęczna	2–2	GKS Tychy	Łęczna
16:30 CET	Roginić 6'; Barauskas (yellow card) 8'; Fryderyk Janaszek 68'; Kamil Orlik (yellow card) 85'	Report	Ertlthaler 29'; Julian Keiblinger 70'; Śpiączka (yellow card) 88'	Stadium: Łęczna Stadium; Attendance: 2,085; Referee: (Poland) Łukasz Karski

30 November 2024 18	Miedź Legnica	1–3	GKS Tychy	Legnica
13:30 CET	Drygas (yellow card) 31'; Kovačević (yellow card) 63'; Marcel Mansfeld 90+7' (pen.)	Report	Julian Keiblinger (yellow card) 28'; Ertlthaler 37' (pen.); Daniel Rumin 62' (pen.); Błachewicz (yellow card) 62'; Dijakovic (yellow card) 82'; Wiktor Niewiarowski 90+1'	Stadium: White Eagle Municipal Stadium; Attendance: 3,117; Referee: (Poland) Tomasz Marciniak

7 December 2024 19	GKS Tychy	4–0	Kotwica Kołobrzeg	Tychy
13:30 CET	Śpiączka 18'; Błachewicz 21'; Daniel Rumin 68'; Jakub Budnicki 78'	Report		Stadium: Stadion Miejski; Attendance: 2,621; Referee: (Poland) Albert Różycki

=== Polish Cup ===
24 September 2024 First round	Olimpia Grudziądz	4–2	GKS Tychy	Grudziądz
18:00	Szymon Krocz 26' 71' 86'; Kacper Cichoń (yellow card) 45+1' (goal) 59'	Report	Hołownia 20'; Marcin Szpakowski (yellow card) 27'; Błachewicz 38'; Ertlthaler (yellow card) 45+1'; Nemanja Nedić (yellow card) 48'; Jakub Budnicki (yellow card) 70'	Stadium: Stadion Centralny; Referee: (Poland) Łukasz Karski
