= 2024–25 Wisła Płock season =

Wisła Płock
2024–25 season
- Manager: Mariusz Misiura
- Stadium: Kazimierz Górski Stadium
- I liga: 3rd
- Polish Cup: Pre-season
- Biggest win: Warta Poznań 1–2 Wisła Płock
Home colours	Away colours

The 2024–25 season is the 78th season in the history of Wisła Płock, and the club's second consecutive season in the I liga. In addition to the domestic league, the team is scheduled to participate in the Polish Cup.

== Transfers ==
=== Out ===
Pos.	Player	Transferred to	Fee	Date	Source
DF	(Poland) Igor Drapiński	(Poland) Piast Gliwice	End of contract	1 July 2024	
MF	(Poland) Dawid Kocyła		End of contract	31 December 2024	

== Friendlies ==
29 June 2024 Friendly	Wisła Płock (Poland)	1–3	(Poland) Polonia Warsaw
11:00

3 July 2024 Friendly	Wisła Płock (Poland)	2–0	(Poland) Znicz Pruszków	Kępa
12:15	Sekulski 32'; Kuczko 58' (pen.)			Stadium: BoniFaCio Spa & Sport Resort; Referee: Tomasz Marciniak

6 July 2024 Friendly	Wisła Płock (Poland)	2–0	(Poland) Unia Skierniewice
10:30

12 July 2024 Friendly	Lechia Gdańsk (Poland)	1–1	(Poland) Wisła Płock
12:30

5 September 2024 Friendly	Wisła Płock (Poland)	0–3	(Poland) Widzew Łódź	Łódź
12:00		Report	Kerk 4'; Hajrizi 6'; Álvarez 44'	Stadium: Stadion MOSiR Łódź

== Competitions ==
=== Overall record ===
Competition	First match	Last match	Starting round	Record							
Competition	First match	Last match	Starting round	Pld	W	D	L	GF	GA	GD	Win %
I liga	21 July 2024	25–26 May 2025	Matchday 1	3	2	1	0	5	3	+2	66.67
Polish Cup				0	0	0	0	0	0	+0	—
Total				3	2	1	0	5	3	+2	66.67

Last updated: 3 August 2024
Source: Soccerway

=== I liga ===
==== League table ====
Pos	Team	Pld	W	D	L	GF	GA	GD	Pts	Promotion or Relegation
1	Arka Gdynia (C, P)	34	21	9	4	63	24	+39	72	Promotion to Ekstraklasa
2	Bruk-Bet Termalica Nieciecza (P)	34	21	8	5	70	39	+31	71	Promotion to Ekstraklasa
3	Wisła Płock (O, P)	34	18	10	6	58	38	+20	64	Qualification for the promotion play-offs
4	Wisła Kraków	34	18	8	8	63	32	+31	62	Qualification for the promotion play-offs
5	Miedź Legnica	34	16	8	10	56	45	+11	56 (Note: Ranked based on goal difference: Miedź Legnica +11, Polonia Warsaw +9.)	Qualification for the promotion play-offs

Source: 1liga.org, 90minut.pl
Rules for classification: 1) Points; 2) Head-to-head points; 3) Head-to-head goal difference; 4) Goal difference; 6) Goals scored; 7) Number of wins; 8) Number of away wins.
(Note: Head-to-head record is used only after all the matches between the teams in question have been played)
(C) Champions; (O) Play-off winner; (P) Promoted
Notes:

Semi-finals; 29 May 2025
3	Wisła Płock	2
6	Polonia Warsaw	1
4	Wisła Kraków	0
5	Miedź Legnica	1

Final; 1 June 2025
3	Wisła Płock	2
5	Miedź Legnica	0

==== Results summary ====
Overall								Home						Away					
Pld	W	D	L	GF	GA	GD	Pts	W	D	L	GF	GA	GD	W	D	L	GF	GA	GD
31	16	9	6	53	35	+18	57	9	4	2	31	16	+15	7	5	4	22	19	+3

Last updated: 2 May 2025.
Source: soccerway

==== Results by round ====
Round	1	2	3
Ground	H	A	H
Result	D	W	W
Position	9		

Updated to match(es) played on 3 August 2024. Source:
A = Away; H = Home; W = Win; D = Draw; L = Loss

==== Matches ====
The match schedule was released on 12 June 2024.

21 July 2024 1	Wisła Płock	1–1	Kotwica Kołobrzeg	Płock
12:00	Famulak 48'		Cywiński 13'	Stadium: Kazimierz Górski Stadium; Referee: Leszek Lewandowski

27 July 2024 2	Warta Poznań	1–2	Wisła Płock	Poznań
19:35	Pleśnierowicz 22'		Jiménez Rodríguez 54'; Kocyła (yellow card) 57'; Kun 66'; Pacheco (yellow card) 89'	Stadium: Warta Poznań Stadium; Referee: Piotr Urban

3 August 2024 3	Wisła Płock	2–1	Chrobry Głogów	Płock
17:00	Sekulski 29' (pen.), 49'		Szarek 77'	Stadium: Kazimierz Górski Stadium; Referee: Łukasz Karski

11 August 2024 4	Odra Opole	1–2	Wisła Płock	Opole
14:30 CEST	Piroch (yellow card) 10'; Muratović 18'	Report	Jime 6' 16'; Sekulski (yellow card) 20'; Iban Salvador (yellow card) 90'	Stadium: Itaka Arena; Referee: (Poland) Piotr Lasyk

18 August 2024 5	Wisła Płock	1–0	Pogoń Siedlce	Płock
17:00 CEST	Fabian Hiszpański (yellow card) 31'; Jime 74'; Niepsuj (yellow card) 82'	Report	Lukáš Hrnčiar (yellow card) 20'	Stadium: Orlen Stadion; Attendance: 5,378; Referee: (Poland) Grzegorz Kawałko

21 August 2024 6	Nieciecza	4–2	Wisła Płock	Nieciecza
18:00 CEST	Faßbender (yellow card) 23'; Kacper Karasek 55' 88' 90+1'; Andrzej Trubeha 76' (pen.); Zapolnik (yellow card) 82'	Report	Niepsuj (yellow card) 30' (yellow-red card) 58'; Jime 37'; Kun 71'; Przemysław Misiak (yellow card) 90+3'	Stadium: Stadion Sportowy Bruk-Bet Termalica; Attendance: 1,763; Referee: (Poland) Daniel Stefański

26 August 2024 7	Wisła Płock	3–2	Ruch Chorzów	Płock
19:00 CEST	Edmundsson 21' (yellow card) 48'; Fabian Hiszpański 70'; Krawczyk 90+3'; Kocyła (yellow card) 90+5'	Report	Lukić (yellow card) 24'; Szwoch 33' (yellow card) 37'; Szczepan (yellow card) 38' (goal) 76' (pen.); Szymon Szymański (yellow card) 63'; Ventúra (yellow card) 78'; Nono (yellow card) 90'	Stadium: Orlen Stadion; Attendance: 7,011; Referee: (Poland) Karol Arys

31 August 2024 8	Wisła Płock	0–0	GKS Tychy	Płock
17:00 CEST	Maciej Famulak (yellow card) 14'; Szymański (yellow card) 76'; Oskar Tomczyk (yellow card) 90+7'	Report	Nemanja Nedić (yellow card) 41'; Teo Kurtaran (yellow card) 70'; Dijakovic (yellow card) 90'; Śpiączka (yellow card) 90'; Maksymilian Dziuba (yellow card) 90+7'	Stadium: Orlen Stadion; Attendance: 5,326; Referee: (Poland) Piotr Urban

14 September 2024 9	Stal Stalowa Wola	1–3	Wisła Płock	Stalowa Wola
14:30 CEST	João Tavares 88'	Report	Haglind-Sangré (yellow card) 1'; Przemysław Misiak 17'; Iban Salvador 45+2'; Dani Pacheco (yellow card) 61'; Edmundsson (red card) 75'; Krystian Pomorski 90'	Stadium: Subcarpathian Football Center; Referee: (Poland) Piotr Rzucidło

20 September 2024 10	Wisła Płock	1–1	Stal Rzeszów	Płock
20:30 CEST	Iban Salvador (yellow card) 37'; Przemysław Misiak (yellow card) 62'; Sekulski 81'; Miłosz Brzozowski (yellow card) 90+6'	Report	Thill 27'; Kościelny (yellow card) 51'; Bąkowski (yellow card) 76'	Stadium: Orlen Stadion; Attendance: 6,018; Referee: (Poland) Marcin Szczerbowicz

30 September 2024 11	ŁKS Łódź	0–1	Wisła Płock	Łódź
19:00 CEST	Feiertag (yellow card) 62'; Wiech (yellow card) 71'	Report	Fabian Hiszpański (yellow card) 15'; Dani Pacheco (yellow card) 46'; Miłosz Brzozowski (yellow card) 54'; Krystian Pomorski 60'	Stadium: Stadion Miejski ŁKS Łódź; Attendance: 7,268; Referee: (Poland) Tomasz Kwiatkowski

5 October 2024 12	Wisła Płock	4–1	Polonia Warsaw	Płock
17:30 CET	Fabian Hiszpański 28'; Sekulski 55' (pen.) 65'; Jime 81'	Report	Zjawiński 8'; Przemysław Szur (yellow card) 23'; Jakub Piątek (yellow card) 42'; Lemanowicz (yellow card) 54'; Michał Bajdur (yellow card) 90+1'	Stadium: Orlen Stadion; Attendance: 6,054; Referee: (Poland) Damian Kos

19 October 2024 13	Znicz Pruszków	2–2	Wisła Płock	Pruszków
19:30 CET	Moskwik (yellow card) 20'; Daniel Stanclik 26'; Majewski 64'; Vladyslav Okhronchuk (yellow card) 66'; Wiktor Nowak (yellow card) 81'	Report	Oskar Tomczyk 54'; Dani Pacheco (yellow card) 69'; Jime 78'	Stadium: Stadion Znicza Pruszków; Referee: (Poland) Sebastian Krasny

27 October 2024 14	Wisła Płock	1–3	Wisła Kraków	Płock
14:30 CET	Fabian Hiszpański (yellow card) 5'; Krystian Pomorski (yellow card) 35'; Sekulski (yellow card) 37'; Edmundsson (yellow card) 42'; Krawczyk 90+7'; Iban Salvador (yellow card) 90+7'	Report	Ángel Rodado 41' 49'; Igbekeme (yellow card) 45+3' (yellow-red card) 71'; Sukiennicki (yellow card) 59'; Jaroch (yellow card) 78'; Kiss 82'	Stadium: Orlen Stadion; Attendance: 8,321; Referee: (Poland) Tomasz Kwiatkowski

2 November 2024 15	Arka Gdynia	2–0	Wisła Płock	Gdynia
19:30 CET	Sobczak (yellow card) 24' (goal) 55' (pen.); Gojny (yellow card) 26'; Filip Kocaba (yellow card) 82'; Vitalucci 87'	Report	Oskar Tomczyk (yellow card) 21'; Sekulski (yellow card) 34'; Krawczyk (yellow card) 39'; Szymański (red card) 77'	Stadium: Stadion Miejski; Referee: (Poland) Marcin Szczerbowicz

10 November 2024 16	Wisła Płock	2–2	Górnik Łęczna	Płock
14:30 CET	Nastić (yellow card) 18' (yellow-red card) 85'; Haglind-Sangré 43'; Edmundsson (yellow card) 53'; Barauskas 84' (o.g.)	Report	Deja 54'; Roginić 57'; Jonathan de Amo (yellow card) 85' (yellow-red card) 90+6'	Stadium: Orlen Stadion; Referee: (Poland) Łukasz Kuźma

=== Polish Cup ===
24 September 2024 First Round	Wisła Płock	0-1	Warta Poznań	Płock
18:00 CEST	Kocyła (yellow card) 90'; Krawczyk (yellow card) 90+6'	Report	Shibata (yellow card) 13'; Kocyła 59' (o.g.); Szeliga (yellow card) 68'; Leo Przybylak (yellow card) 79'; Maćkowiak (yellow card) 83'; Tkachuk (yellow card) 89'	Stadium: Orlen Stadion; Attendance: 4,013; Referee: (Poland) Wojciech Myć
