= 2018–19 Lech Poznań season =

Lech Poznań
2018–19 season
- Chairman: Karol Klimczak
- Manager: Dariusz Żuraw; From 1 April 2019; Adam Nawałka; 25 November 2018 - 31 March 2019; Dariusz Żuraw (interim); 4–25 November 2018; Ivan Đurđević; 21 May 2018 – 4 November 2018
- Stadium: Stadion Miejski
- Ekstraklasa: 8th
- Polish Cup: Round of 32
- UEFA Europa League: Third qualifying round
- Top goalscorer: League: Christian Gytkjær (12 goals); All: Christian Gytkjær (17 goals)
- Highest home attendance: Ekstraklasa: 24,164 vs. Legia Warsaw (23 February 2019)
- Lowest home attendance: Ekstraklasa: 0 vs. Cracovia (29 July 2018); 0 vs. Zagłębie Sosnowiec (12 August 2018); UEFA Europa League: 0 vs. Gandzasar Kapan (12 July 2018)
Home colours	Away colours	Third colours
- All statistics correct as of 26 May 2019.

Lech Poznań is a Polish football club based in Poznań. This is their 96th season overall. They compete in Ekstraklasa, the highest ranking league in Poland.

== Squad ==
As of end of 2018–19 season.

Note: Flags indicate national team as defined under FIFA eligibility rules; some limited exceptions apply. Players may hold more than one non-FIFA nationality.

No.	Pos.	Nation	Player
1	GK	BIH	Jasmin Burić
2	DF	POL	Robert Gumny
3	DF	ARG	Vernon De Marco (on loan from (Slovakia) Slovan Bratislava)
4	DF	NOR	Thomas Rogne
5	DF	GRE	Dimitrios Goutas (on loan from (Greece) Olympiacos)
6	MF	POL	Łukasz Trałka
7	MF	POL	Maciej Gajos
10	MF	SUI	Darko Jevtić
11	FW	RUS	Timur Zhamaletdinov (on loan from (Russia) CSKA Moscow)
13	DF	MNE	Nikola Vujadinović
16	MF	POL	Juliusz Letniowski
17	MF	POL	Maciej Makuszewski
18	MF	ROU	Mihai Răduț
19	MF	POL	Tomasz Cywka
20	MF	POL	Mateusz Skrzypczak

No.	Pos.	Nation	Player
22	DF	UKR	Volodymyr Kostevych
24	MF	POR	João Amaral
25	MF	POR	Pedro Tiba (Captain)
26	DF	POL	Rafał Janicki (on loan from Lechia Gdańsk)
29	MF	POL	Kamil Jóźwiak
30	GK	SVK	Matúš Putnocký
31	GK	POL	Krzysztof Bąkowski
32	FW	DEN	Christian Gytkjær
33	GK	POL	Karol Szymański
34	MF	POL	Tymoteusz Klupś
35	DF	POL	Wiktor Pleśnierowicz
36	MF	POL	Filip Marchwiński
37	DF	POL	Marcin Wasielewski
77	DF	POL	Piotr Tomasik

=== Out on loan ===
Note: Flags indicate national team as defined under FIFA eligibility rules; some limited exceptions apply. Players may hold more than one non-FIFA nationality.

No.	Pos.	Nation	Player
8	FW	POL	Paweł Tomczyk (at Piast Gliwice until 30 June 2019)
14	FW	POL	Hubert Sobol (at Warta Poznań until 31 December 2019)
15	MF	POL	Jakub Moder (at Odra Opole until 30 June 2019)
27	DF	POL	Tymoteusz Puchacz (at GKS Katowice until 30 June 2019)

No.	Pos.	Nation	Player
28	DF	POL	Maciej Orłowski (at Górnik Łęczna until 31 December 2019)
—	GK	POL	Bartosz Mrozek (at Elana Toruń until 30 June 2019)
—	GK	POL	Miłosz Mleczko (at Puszcza Niepołomice until 30 June 2019)

== Transfer ==
=== Summer transfer window ===
==== In ====
No.	Pos.	Nat.	Name	Age	EU	Moving from	Type	Transfer window	Ends	Transfer fee	Source
24	MF	(Portugal)	João Amaral	26	EU	(Portugal) Benfica	Transfer	Summer	2022	€1,500,000	
19	MF	(Poland)	Tomasz Cywka	29	EU	Wisła Kraków	Transfer	Summer	2020	Free	
5	DF	(Greece)	Dimitrios Goutas	24	EU	(Greece) Olympiacos	Loan	Summer	2019	Free	
28	DF	(Poland)	Maciej Orłowski	24	EU	Lech II Poznań	Transfer	Summer	2020	Youth system	
35	DF	(Poland)	Wiktor Pleśnierowicz	17	EU	Lech II Poznań	Transfer	Summer	2021	Youth system	
27	DF	(Poland)	Tymoteusz Puchacz	19	EU	Zagłębie Sosnowiec	Loan return	Summer	Undisclosed	Free	
14	FW	(Poland)	Hubert Sobol	18	EU	Lech II Poznań	Transfer	Summer	2021	Youth system	
33	GK	(Poland)	Karol Szymański	24	EU	Polonia Środa Wielkopolska	Transfer	Summer	2020	Free	
8	FW	(Poland)	Paweł Tomczyk	20	EU	Podbeskidzie Bielsko-Biała	Loan return	Summer	2021	Free	
25	MF	(Portugal)	Pedro Tiba	29	EU	(Portugal) Braga	Transfer	Summer	2021	€1,000,000	
11	FW	(Spain)	Dioni Villalba	28	EU	(Spain) Fuenlabrada	Transfer	Summer	2020	Undisclosed	
37	DF	(Poland)	Marcin Wasielewski	23	EU	Znicz Pruszków	Loan return	Summer	2019	Free	

Total spending: ▼€2,500,000

==== Out ====
No.	Pos.	Nat.	Name	Age	EU	Moving to	Type	Transfer window	Transfer fee	Source
23	MF	(Sweden)	Nicklas Bärkroth	26	EU	(Sweden) Djurgårdens IF	Transfer	Summer	€200,000	
66	DF	(Austria) (Bosnia and Herzegovina)	Emir Dilaver	27	EU	(Croatia) Dinamo Zagreb	Transfer	Summer	€1,500,000	
28	MF	(Poland)	Dariusz Formella	22	EU	Raków Częstochowa previously on loan	Transfer	Summer	€25,000	
11	FW	(Ukraine)	Oleksiy Khoblenko	24	Non-EU	(Ukraine) Chornomorets Odesa	Loan return	Summer	Free	
14	FW	(Bosnia and Herzegovina)	Elvir Koljić	22	Non-EU	(Bosnia and Herzegovina) Krupa	Loan return	Summer	Free	
36	GK	(Poland)	Mateusz Lis	21	EU	Wisła Kraków previously on loan at Raków Częstochowa	Transfer	Summer	€125,000	
86	MF	(Poland)	Radosław Majewski	31	EU	Pogoń Szczecin	Transfer	Summer	Free	
15	MF	(Poland)	Jakub Moder	19	EU	Odra Opole	Loan	Summer	Loan	
31	GK	(Poland)	Bartosz Mrozek	18	EU	Elana Toruń	Loan	Summer	Loan	
27	DF	(Poland)	Tymoteusz Puchacz	19	EU	GKS Katowice	Loan	Summer	Free	
21	MF	(Poland)	Jakub Serafin	22	EU	Cracovia	Transfer	Summer	€100,000	
16	MF	(Croatia)	Mario Šitum	26	EU	(Croatia) Dinamo Zagreb	Loan return	Summer	Free	

Total income: ▲€1,950,000

Total expenditure: ▼€550,000

=== Winter transfer window ===
==== In ====
No.	Pos.	Nat.	Name	Age	EU	Moving from	Type	Transfer window	Ends	Transfer fee	Source
31	GK	(Poland)	Krzysztof Bąkowski	16	EU	Lech II Poznań	Transfer	Winter	2021	Youth system	
	FW	(Poland)	Dawid Kurminowski	19	EU	(Slovakia) Zemplín Michalovce	Loan return	Winter	2021	Free	
16	MF	(Poland)	Juliusz Letniowski	20	EU	Bytovia Bytów	Transfer	Winter	2022	€80,000	
36	MF	(Poland)	Filip Marchwiński	16	EU	Lech II Poznań	Transfer	Winter	2021	Youth system	
20	MF	(Poland)	Mateusz Skrzypczak	18	EU	Lech II Poznań	Transfer	Winter	2020	Youth system	
11	FW	(Russia)	Timur Zhamaletdinov	21	EU	(Russia) CSKA Moscow	Loan	Winter	2019	Free	

Total spending: ▼€80,000

==== Out ====
No.	Pos.	Nat.	Name	Age	EU	Moving to	Type	Transfer window	Transfer fee	Source
14	FW	(Poland)	Hubert Sobol	18	EU	Warta Poznań	Loan	Winter	Free	
8	FW	(Poland)	Paweł Tomczyk	20	EU	Piast Gliwice	Loan	Winter	Free	
11	FW	(Spain)	Dioni Villalba	29	EU	(Spain) Cultural y Deportiva Leonesa	Transfer	Winter	Free	
28	DF	(Poland)	Maciej Orłowski	25	EU	Górnik Łęczna	Loan	Winter	Free	

Total income: €0

Total expenditure: ▼€80,000

== Friendlies ==
Win Draw Loss

23 June 2018 Club friendly	Lech Poznań	2–0	Warta Poznań	Opalenica
10:00 CEST (UTC+02:00)	Jóźwiak 5', 15'	Official website 90minut		Stadium: Hotel Remes Sport & Spa; Referee: Kamil Waskowski (Poznań)

30 June 2018 Club friendly	Lech Poznań	2–1	(Israel) Hapoel Be'er Sheva	Opalenica
11:00 CEST (UTC+02:00)	De Marco 6'; Trałka 44'	Official website 90minut	Taha 1'	Stadium: Hotel Remes Sport & Spa

5 July 2018 Club friendly	Železiarne Podbrezová (Slovakia)	0–5	Lech Poznań	Szamotuły
18:00 CEST (UTC+02:00)		Official website 90minut	De Marco 30'; Jevtić 34'; Makuszewski 66', 73'; Gajos 68'	Stadium: Stadion im. Stanisława Kurowskiego; Referee: Szymon Lizak (Poznań)

7 July 2018 Club friendly	Lech Poznań	0–0	(Cyprus) AEK Larnaca	Opalenica
18:00 CEST (UTC+02:00)		Official website 90minut		Stadium: Hotel Remes Sport & Spa

23 January 2019 Club friendly	Lech Poznań	1–3	(Bulgaria) Etar Veliko Tarnovo	Kemerağzı, Turkey
15:30 CET (UTC+01:00)	Marchwiński 90'	Report	Batrović 5'; Angelov 39'; Mladenov 73'	Stadium: Miracle Resort Hotel

26 January 2019 Club friendly	Lech Poznań	1–2	(Austria) Sturm Graz	Kumköy, Turkey
17:30 CET (UTC+01:00)	Janicki 90'	Report	Schrammel 29'; Ljubic 78'	Stadium: Limak Arcadia Golf and Sport Resort

27 January 2019 Club friendly	Lech Poznań	1–0	(Slovakia) DAC Dunajská Streda	Belek, Turkey
09:00 CET (UTC+01:00)	Tomczyk 72'	Report		Stadium: Bellis Deluxe Hotel

30 January 2019 Club friendly	Lech Poznań	0–1	(Serbia) Voždovac	Belek, Turkey
15:30 CET (UTC+01:00)		Report	Mašović 59'	Stadium: Bellis Deluxe Hotel

31 January 2019 Club friendly	Lech Poznań	0–3	(Ukraine) Shakhtar Donetsk	Belek, Turkey
15:05 CET (UTC+01:00)		Report	Moraes 31'; Solomon 84'; Kayode 90'	Stadium: Regnum Carya Golf & Spa Resort

16 March 2019 Club friendly	Lech Poznań	1–1	Lech II Poznań	Wronki
17:00 CET (UTC+01:00)	Marchwiński 36'	Report	Tupaj 63'	Stadium: Stadion Leśny

== Competitions ==
Win Draw Loss

=== Overall ===
Competition	Started round	Current position / round	Final position / round	First match	Last match
Ekstraklasa	—	—	8th	22 July 2018	19 May 2019
Polish Cup	Round of 64	—	Round of 32	25 September 2018	30 October 2018
UEFA Europa League	First qualifying round	—	Third qualifying round	12 July 2018	16 August 2018

Updated to match played 19 May 2019
Source: Competitions

=== Overview ===
Competition	Record							
Competition	G	W	D	L	GF	GA	GD	Win %
Ekstraklasa	37	15	7	15	49	48	+1	40.54
Polish Cup	2	1	0	1	1	1	+0	50.00
UEFA Europa League	6	2	1	3	8	8	+0	33.33
Total	45	18	8	19	58	57	+1	40.00

Updated to match played 19 May 2019
Source: Competitions

=== Ekstraklasa ===
==== Regular season ====
===== League table =====
Pos	Team	Pld	W	D	L	GF	GA	GD	Pts	Qualification
6	Jagiellonia Białystok	30	13	8	9	45	41	+4	47 (Note: Head-to-head record: Zagłębie Lubin 0–2 Jagiellonia Białystok, Jagiellonia Białystok 0–4 Zagłębie Lubin.)	Qualification for the Championship round
7	Pogoń Szczecin	30	12	7	11	44	42	+2	43 (Note: Head-to-head record: Pogoń Szczecin 3–0 Lech Poznań, Lech Poznań 3–2 Pogoń Szczecin.)	Qualification for the Championship round
8	Lech Poznań	30	13	4	13	41	40	+1	43	Qualification for the Championship round
9	Wisła Kraków	30	12	6	12	55	48	+7	42	Qualification for the Relegation round
10	Korona Kielce	30	10	10	10	35	44	−9	40	Qualification for the Relegation round

Source: Ekstraklasa, 90minut
Rules for classification: 1) Points; 2) Head-to-head points; 3) Head-to-head goal difference; 4) Head-to-head goals scored; 5) Head-to-head away goals scored (only if two teams); 6) Goal difference; 7) Goals scored; 8) Fairplay ranking; 9) Draw. (Note: Head-to-head record is used only after all the matches between the teams in question have been played.)

===== Results summary =====
Overall								Home						Away					
Pld	W	D	L	GF	GA	GD	Pts	W	D	L	GF	GA	GD	W	D	L	GF	GA	GD
30	13	4	13	41	40	+1	43	9	1	5	24	19	+5	4	3	8	17	21	−4

Last updated: 13 April 2019.
Source: 90minut.pl

===== Results by round =====
Round	1	2	3	4	5	6	7	8	9	10	11	12	13	14	15	16	17	18	19	20	21	22	23	24	25	26	27	28	29	30
Ground	A	H	A	H	H	A	H	A	A	H	A	H	A	H	A	H	A	H	A	A	H	A	H	H	A	H	A	H	A	H
Result	W	W	W	W	L	L	D	L	L	W	D	W	L	L	D	W	L	W	W	W	L	L	W	W	L	L	D	W	L	L
Position	3	2	2	1	1	5	3	7	8	7	7	6	6	7	8	8	8	7	4	3	5	7	5	5	5	6	9	8	8	8

Updated to match(es) played on 13 April. Source: 90minut.pl
A = Away; H = Home; W = Win; D = Draw; L = Loss

===== Matches =====
Win Draw Loss

22 July 2018 Match 1	Wisła Płock	1–2	Lech Poznań	Płock
18:00 CEST (UTC+02:00)	Merebashvili 77'	Ekstraklasa; 90minut	Trałka 16'; Tiba 89'	Stadium: Stadion im. Kazimierza Górskiego; Attendance: 8,114; Referee: Krzysztof Jakubik (Siedlce)

29 July 2018 Match 2	Lech Poznań	2–0	Cracovia	Poznań
18:00 CEST (UTC+02:00)	Jevtić 21'; Gytkjær 88'	Ekstraklasa; 90minut		Stadium: Stadion Miejski; Attendance: 0 (No-crowd match); Referee: Mariusz Złotek (Stalowa Wola)

5 August 2018 Match 3	Śląsk Wrocław	0–1	Lech Poznań	Wrocław
15:30 CEST (UTC+02:00)		Ekstraklasa; 90minut	Tiba 83'	Stadium: Stadion Miejski; Attendance: 17,926; Referee: Daniel Stefański (Bydgoszcz)

12 August 2018 Match 4	Lech Poznań	4–0	Zagłębie Sosnowiec	Poznań
18:00 CEST (UTC+02:00)	Amaral 7'; Tomczyk 20', 41'; Gajos 70'	Ekstraklasa; 90minut		Stadium: Stadion Miejski; Attendance: 0 (No-crowd match); Referee: Wojciech Myć (Lublin)

19 August 2018 Match 5	Lech Poznań	2–5	Wisła Kraków	Poznań
18:00 CEST (UTC+02:00)	Amaral 8'; Gytkjær 18' (pen.)	Ekstraklasa; 90minut	Košťál 24'; Ondrášek 50', 61'; Gytkjær 55' (o.g.); Kolar 89'	Stadium: Stadion Miejski; Attendance: 13,141; Referee: Paweł Raczkowski (Warsaw)

26 August 2018 Match 6	Zagłębie Lubin	2–1	Lech Poznań	Lubin
18:00 CEST (UTC+02:00)	Janoszka 15'; Tuszyński 52'	Ekstraklasa; 90minut	Cywka 49'	Stadium: Stadion Zagłębia; Attendance: 9,107; Referee: Tomasz Musiał (Kraków)

1 September 2018 Match 7	Lech Poznań	1–1	Piast Gliwice	Poznań
20:30 CEST (UTC+02:00)	Gytkjær 36' (pen.)	Ekstraklasa; 90minut	Hateley 73'	Stadium: Stadion Miejski; Attendance: 8,139; Referee: Tomasz Kwiatkowski (Warsaw)

16 September 2018 Match 8	Legia Warsaw	1–0	Lech Poznań	Warsaw
18:00 CEST (UTC+02:00)	Nagy 31'	Ekstraklasa; 90minut		Stadium: Polish Army Stadium; Attendance: 22 731; Referee: Daniel Stefański (Bydgoszcz)

21 September 2018 Match 9	Arka Gdynia	1–0	Lech Poznań	Gdynia
20:30 CEST (UTC+02:00)	Janota 76'	Ekstraklasa; 90minut		Stadium: Stadion GOSiR; Attendance: 9,501; Referee: Wojciech Myć (Lublin)

30 September 2018 Match 10	Lech Poznań	2–1	Miedź Legnica	Poznań
18:00 CEST (UTC+02:00)	Gytkjær 11'; Amaral 51'	Ekstraklasa; 90minut	Szczepaniak 73'	Stadium: Stadion Miejski; Attendance: 20,846; Referee: Jarosław Przybył (Kluczbork)

5 October 2018 Match 11	Górnik Zabrze	2–2	Lech Poznań	Zabrze
20:30 CEST (UTC+02:00)	Jiménez 7'; Żurkowski 49'	Ekstraklasa; 90minut	Tiba 55'; Kostevych 77'	Stadium: Ernest Pohl Stadium; Attendance: 11,764; Referee: Tomasz Kwiatkowski (Warsaw)

20 October 2018 Match 12	Lech Poznań	2–1	Korona Kielce	Poznań
20:30 CEST (UTC+02:00)	Gytkjær 25', 73'	Ekstraklasa; 90minut	Soriano 82'	Stadium: Stadion Miejski; Attendance: 9,487; Referee: Tomasz Musiał (Kraków)

27 October 2018 Match 13	Pogoń Szczecin	3–0	Lech Poznań	Szczecin
20:30 CEST (UTC+02:00)	Podstawski 22'; Dvali 41'; Buksa 60'	Ekstraklasa; 90minut		Stadium: Stadion Miejski im. Floriana Krygiera; Attendance: 8,680; Referee: Paweł Gil (Lublin)

4 November 2018 Match 14	Lech Poznań	0–1	Lechia Gdańsk	Poznań
18:00 CET (UTC+01:00)	Paixão 26'	Ekstraklasa; 90minut		Stadium: Stadion Miejski; Attendance: 8,059; Referee: Daniel Stefański (Bydgoszcz)

11 November 2018 Match 15	Jagiellonia Białystok	2–2	Lech Poznań	Białystok
18:00 CET (UTC+01:00)	Frankowski 21'; Świderski 50'	Ekstraklasa; 90minut	Rogne 27'; Wasielewski 34'	Stadium: Stadion Miejski; Attendance: 12,988; Referee: Bartosz Frankowski (Toruń)

24 November 2018 Match 16	Lech Poznań	2–1	Wisła Płock	Poznań
18:00 CET (UTC+01:00)	Jevtić 45+1'; Gytkjær 45+4'	Ekstraklasa; 90minut	Szymański 29'	Stadium: Stadion Miejski; Attendance: 8,442; Referee: Paweł Raczkowski (Warsaw)

2 December 2018 Match 17	Cracovia	1–0	Lech Poznań	Kraków
18:00 CET (UTC+01:00)	Wdowiak 55'	Ekstraklasa; 90minut		Stadium: Marshal Józef Piłsudski Stadium; Attendance: 4,261; Referee: Szymon Marciniak (Płock)

7 December 2018 Match 18	Lech Poznań	2–0	Śląsk Wrocław	Poznań
20:30 CET (UTC+01:00)	Amaral 75'; Gytkjær 90+9'	Ekstraklasa; 90minut		Stadium: Stadion Miejski; Attendance: 12,545; Referee: Bartosz Frankowski (Toruń)

16 December 2018 Match 19	Zagłębie Sosnowiec	0–6	Lech Poznań	Sosnowiec
18:00 CET (UTC+01:00)		Ekstraklasa; 90minut	Gumny 22'; Gytkjær 41'; Klupś 51'; Amaral 58', 79'; Marchwiński 87'	Stadium: Stadion Ludowy; Attendance: 2,945; Referee: Tomasz Kwiatkowski (Warsaw)

21 December 2018 Match 20	Wisła Kraków	0–1	Lech Poznań	Kraków
20:30 CET (UTC+01:00)		Ekstraklasa; 90minut	Tiba 75'	Stadium: Stadion Miejski im. Henryka Reymana; Attendance: 22,491; Referee: Paweł Raczkowski (Warsaw)

8 February 2019 Match 21	Lech Poznań	1–2	Zagłębie Lubin	Poznań
20:30 CET (UTC+01:00)	Gytkjær 66'	Ekstraklasa; 90minut	Starzyński 75'; Vujadinović 90+3' (o.g.)	Stadium: Stadion Miejski; Attendance: 12,719; Referee: Tomasz Kwiatkowski (Warsaw)

15 February 2019 Match 22	Piast Gliwice	4–0	Lech Poznań	Gliwice
20:30 CET (UTC+01:00)	Parzyszek 31'; Félix 53'; Kirkeskov 66'; Valencia 70'	Ekstraklasa; 90minut		Stadium: Stadion Miejski; Attendance: 4,608; Referee: Jarosław Przybył (Kluczbork)

23 February 2019 Match 23	Lech Poznań	2–0	Legia Warsaw	Poznań
18:00 CET (UTC+01:00)	Vujadinović 8'; Gytkjær 79' (pen.)	Ekstraklasa; 90minut		Stadium: Stadion Miejski; Attendance: 24,164; Referee: Tomasz Musiał (Kraków)

3 March 2019 Match 24	Lech Poznań	1–0	Arka Gdynia	Poznań
18:00 CET (UTC+01:00)	Gytkjær 39'	Ekstraklasa; 90minut		Stadium: Stadion Miejski; Attendance: 18,587; Referee: Paweł Gil (Lublin)

10 March 2019 Match 25	Miedź Legnica	3–2	Lech Poznań	Legnica
18:00 CET (UTC+01:00)	Musa 4'; Forsell 36'; Santana 83' (pen.)	Ekstraklasa; 90minut	Gajos 56'; Amaral 90'	Stadium: Stadion im. Orła Białego; Attendance: 5,462; Referee: Tomasz Kwiatkowski (Warsaw)

15 March 2019 Match 26	Lech Poznań	0–3	Górnik Zabrze	Poznań
20:30 CET (UTC+01:00)		Ekstraklasa; 90minut	Angulo 41', 86'; Sekulić 67'	Stadium: Stadion Miejski; Attendance: 9,881; Referee: Bartosz Frankowski (Toruń)

30 March 2019 Match 27	Korona Kielce	0–0	Lech Poznań	Kielce
20:30 CET (UTC+01:00)		Ekstraklasa; 90minut		Stadium: Stadion Miejski; Attendance: 8,166; Referee: Piotr Lasyk (Bytom)

3 April 2019 Match 28	Lech Poznań	3–2	Pogoń Szczecin	Poznań
18:00 CEST (UTC+02:00)	Jóźwiak 24', 54'; Vujadinović 45'	Ekstraklasa; 90minut	Guarrotxena 86'; Izumisawa 89'	Stadium: Stadion Miejski; Attendance: 7,112; Referee: Paweł Raczkowski (Warsaw)

6 April 2019 Match 29	Lechia Gdańsk	1–0	Lech Poznań	Gdańsk
20:30 CEST (UTC+02:00)	Sobiech 10'	Ekstraklasa; 90minut		Stadium: Stadion Energa Gdańsk; Attendance: 19,016; Referee: Daniel Stefański (Bydgoszcz)

13 April 2019 Match 30	Lech Poznań	0–2	Jagiellonia Białystok	Poznań
18:00 CEST (UTC+02:00)		Ekstraklasa; 90minut	Imaz 45' (pen.), 61'	Stadium: Stadion Miejski; Attendance: 10,824; Referee: Bartosz Frankowski (Toruń)

==== Championship round ====
===== League table =====
Pos	Team	Pld	W	D	L	GF	GA	GD	Pts	Qualification
4	Cracovia	37	17	6	14	45	43	+2	57 (Note: Points in regular season: Cracovia 48 points, Jagiellonia Białystok 47 points.)	Qualification for the Europa League first qualifying round
5	Jagiellonia Białystok	37	16	9	12	55	52	+3	57	
6	Zagłębie Lubin	37	15	8	14	57	48	+9	53	
7	Pogoń Szczecin	37	14	10	13	57	54	+3	52 (Note: Head-to-head in regular season record: Pogoń Szczecin 3–0 Lech Poznań, Lech Poznań 3–2 Pogoń Szczecin.)	
8	Lech Poznań	37	15	7	15	49	48	+1	52	

Source: Ekstraklasa, 90minut
Rules for classification: 1) Points; 2) Points in regular season; 3) Head-to-head points in regular season; 4) Head-to-head goal difference in regular season; 5) Head-to-head goals scored in regular season; 5) Head-to-head away goals scored in regular season (if only two teams); 7) Goal difference; 8) Goals scored; 9) Fairplay ranking; 10) Play-off (only if needed to decide champion, teams for relegation or teams for UEFA competitions).

===== Results summary =====
Overall								Home						Away					
Pld	W	D	L	GF	GA	GD	Pts	W	D	L	GF	GA	GD	W	D	L	GF	GA	GD
37	15	7	15	49	48	+1	52	11	2	5	28	21	+7	4	5	10	21	27	−6

Last updated: 19 May 2019.
Source: 90minut.pl

===== Results by round =====
Round	1	2	3	4	5	6	7
Ground	A	H	A	H	A	H	A
Result	D	W	D	D	L	W	L
Position	8	7	7	7	7	7	8

Updated to match(es) played on 19 May 2019. Source: 90minut.pl
A = Away; H = Home; W = Win; D = Draw; L = Loss

===== Matches =====
Win Draw Loss

20 April 2019 Match 31	Jagiellonia Białystok	3–3	Lech Poznań	Białystok
18:00 CEST (UTC+02:00)	Imaz 42' (pen.), 64' (pen.); Kadlec 54'	Ekstraklasa; 90minut	Vujadinović 5'; Amaral 21'; Zhamaletdinov 77'	Stadium: Stadion Miejski; Attendance: 8,412; Referee: Daniel Stefański (Bydgoszcz)

24 April 2019 Match 32	Lech Poznań	1–0	Legia Warsaw	Poznań
20:30 CEST (UTC+02:00)	Marchwiński 81'	Ekstraklasa; 90minut		Stadium: Stadion Miejski; Attendance: 11,935; Referee: Jarosław Przybył (Kluczbork)

27 April 2019 Match 33	Pogoń Szczecin	1–1	Lech Poznań	Szczecin
18:00 CEST (UTC+02:00)	Majewski 45'	Ekstraklasa; 90minut	Drygas 88' (o.g.)	Stadium: Stadion Miejski; Attendance: 4,376; Referee: Paweł Gil (Lublin)

4 May 2019 Match 34	Lech Poznań	1–1	Zagłębie Lubin	Poznań
18:00 CEST (UTC+02:00)	Jóźwiak 47'	Ekstraklasa; 90minut	Starzyński 85' (pen.)	Stadium: Stadion Miejski; Attendance: 7,855; Referee: Piotr Lasyk (Bytom)

11 May 2019 Match 35	Cracovia	1–0	Lech Poznań	Kraków
20:30 CEST (UTC+02:00)	Sipľak 6'	Ekstraklasa; 90minut		Stadium: Stadion Cracovii; Attendance: 10,631; Referee: Szymon Marciniak (Płock)

15 May 2019 Match 36	Lech Poznań	2–1	Lechia Gdańsk	Poznań
20:30 CEST (UTC+02:00)	Augustyn 59' (o.g.); Jevtić 90+2'	Ekstraklasa; 90minut	Mak 71'	Stadium: Stadion Miejski; Attendance: 7,516; Referee: Bartosz Frankowski (Toruń)

19 May 2019 Match 37	Piast Gliwice	1–0	Lech Poznań	Gliwice
18:00 CEST (UTC+02:00)	Parzyszek 27'	Ekstraklasa; 90minut		Stadium: Stadion Miejski; Attendance: 9,913; Referee: Szymon Marciniak (Płock)

=== Polish Cup ===
25 September 2018 Round of 64	ŁKS Łódź	0–1 (a.e.t.)	Lech Poznań	Łódź
15:00 CEST (UTC+02:00)		PZPN; 90minut	Amaral 120'	Stadium: Stadion ŁKS; Attendance: 4,006; Referee: Łukasz Szczech (Warsaw)

30 October 2018 Round of 32	Raków Częstochowa	1–0	Lech Poznań	Częstochowa
17:45 CET (UTC+01:00)	Szczepański 3'	PZPN; 90minut		Stadium: Stadion Miejski; Attendance: 4,000; Referee: Piotr Lasyk (Bytom)

=== UEFA Europa League ===
==== First qualifying round ====
12 July 2018 First leg	Lech Poznań (Poland)	2–0	(Armenia) Gandzasar Kapan	Poznań, Poland
20:45 CEST (UTC+02:00)	Gytkjær 10', 15' (pen.)	Report		Stadium: Stadion Miejski; Attendance: 0 (No-crowd match); Referee: Yigal Frid (Israel)

19 July 2018 Second leg	Gandzasar Kapan (Armenia)	2–1 (2–3 agg.)	(Poland) Lech Poznań	Yerevan, Armenia
17:00 CEST (UTC+02:00)	Lubambo 50'; Harutyunyan 67'	Report	Trałka 90+5'	Stadium: Vazgen Sargsyan Republican Stadium; Attendance: 1,645; Referee: Mohammed Al-Hakim (Sweden)

==== Second qualifying round ====
26 July 2018 First leg	Shakhtyor Soligorsk (Belarus)	1–1	(Poland) Lech Poznań	Salihorsk, Belarus
19:30 CEST (UTC+02:00)	Bakaj 53'	Report	Amaral 89'	Stadium: Stroitel Stadium; Attendance: 3,700; Referee: Svein Oddvar Moen (Norway)

2 August 2018 Second leg	Lech Poznań (Poland)	3–1 (a.e.t.) (4–2 agg.)	(Belarus) Shakhtyor Soligorsk	Poznań, Poland
20:45 CEST (UTC+02:00)	Gytkjær 15', 94', 118'	Report	Laptsew 79'	Stadium: Stadion Miejski; Attendance: 16,507; Referee: Christian Dingert (Germany)

==== Third qualifying round ====
9 August 2018 First leg	Genk (Belgium)	2–0	(Poland) Lech Poznań	Genk, Belgium
20:00 CEST (UTC+02:00)	Malinovskyi 44'; Samatta 56'	Report		Stadium: Luminus Arena; Attendance: 13,540; Referee: Marius Avram (Romania)

16 August 2018 Second leg	Lech Poznań (Poland)	1–2 (1–4 agg.)	(Belgium) Genk	Poznań, Poland
20:15 CEST (UTC+02:00)	Cywka 50'	Report	Samatta 19'; Trossard 45+1' (pen.)	Stadium: Stadion Miejski; Attendance: 20,765; Referee: Marco Guida (Italy)

== Squad statistics ==
=== Appearances and goals ===
As of 19 May 2019.

No.	Pos	Player	Ekstraklasa		Polish Cup		UEFA Europa League		Total	
No.	Pos	Player	Apps	Goals	Apps	Goals	Apps	Goals	Apps	Goals
Goalkeepers
1	GK	(Bosnia and Herzegovina) Jasmin Burić	27	0	1	0	5	0	33	0
30	GK	(Slovakia) Matúš Putnocký	10+1	0	1	0	1	0	13	0
31	GK	(Poland) Krzysztof Bąkowski	0	0	0	0	0	0	0	0
33	GK	(Poland) Karol Szymański	0	0	0	0	0	0	0	0
Defenders
2	DF	(Poland) Robert Gumny	19	1	1	0	0	0	20	1
3	DF	(Argentina) Vernon De Marco	12+3	0	1	0	6	0	22	0
4	DF	(Norway) Thomas Rogne	22+1	1	1	0	5	0	29	1
5	DF	(Greece) Dimitrios Goutas	8+1	0	2	0	0	0	11	0
13	DF	(Montenegro) Nikola Vujadinović	22+1	3	0	0	2+1	0	26	3
22	DF	(Ukraine) Volodymyr Kostevych	24+2	1	2	0	4	0	32	1
26	DF	(Poland) Rafał Janicki	21	0	1	0	5	0	27	0
35	DF	(Poland) Wiktor Pleśnierowicz	0	0	0	0	0	0	0	0
37	DF	(Poland) Marcin Wasielewski	13+4	1	0	0	0	0	17	1
77	DF	(Poland) Piotr Tomasik	9+7	0	0+1	0	1	0	18	0
Midfielders
6	MF	(Poland) Łukasz Trałka	25+2	1	2	0	2+2	1	33	2
7	MF	(Poland) Maciej Gajos	14+12	2	2	0	5+1	0	34	2
10	MF	(Switzerland) Darko Jevtić	20+6	3	0	0	4+2	0	32	3
16	MF	(Poland) Juliusz Letniowski	0	0	0	0	0	0	0	0
17	MF	(Poland) Maciej Makuszewski	22+7	0	0	0	5	0	34	0
18	MF	(Romania) Mihai Răduț	4+5	0	0+2	0	2+2	0	15	0
19	MF	(Poland) Tomasz Cywka	7+2	1	1	0	6	1	16	2
20	MF	(Poland) Mateusz Skrzypczak	2+1	0	0	0	0	0	3	0
24	MF	(Portugal) João Amaral	20+5	8	1+1	1	1+2	1	30	10
25	MF	(Portugal) Pedro Tiba	33	4	2	0	4+1	0	40	4
29	MF	(Poland) Kamil Jóźwiak	25+6	3	1+1	0	1+1	0	35	3
34	MF	(Poland) Tymoteusz Klupś	10+10	1	0+1	0	0	0	21	1
36	MF	(Poland) Filip Marchwiński	3+8	2	0	0	0	0	11	2
Forwards
11	FW	(Russia) Timur Zhamaletdinov	1+6	1	0	0	0	0	7	1
21	FW	(Poland) Krzysztof Kołodziej	1+2	0	0	0	0	0	3	0
32	FW	(Denmark) Christian Gytkjær	29+2	12	2	0	6	5	39	17
Players who appeared for Lech and left the club during the season:
8	FW	(Poland) Paweł Tomczyk	2+8	2	0	0	0+3	0	13	2
11	FW	(Spain) Dioni Villalba	0+7	0	1	0	0	0	8	0
14	FW	(Poland) Hubert Sobol	0+1	0	0	0	0	0	1	0
23	MF	(Sweden) Nicklas Bärkroth	0	0	0	0	0+1	0	1	0
28	DF	(Poland) Maciej Orłowski	2	0	0	0	1+2	0	5	0

=== Goalscorers ===
As of 19 March 2019.

Place	Position	Number	Nation	Name	Ekstraklasa	Polish Cup	UEL	Total
1	FW	32	(Denmark)	Christian Gytkjær	12	0	5	17
2	MF	24	(Portugal)	João Amaral	8	1	1	10
3	MF	25	(Portugal)	Pedro Tiba	4	0	0	4
4	MF	10	(Switzerland)	Darko Jevtić	3	0	0	3
4	DF	13	(Montenegro)	Nikola Vujadinović	3	0	0	3
4	MF	29	(Poland)	Kamil Jóźwiak	3	0	0	3
7	MF	6	(Poland)	Łukasz Trałka	1	0	1	2
7	MF	7	(Poland)	Maciej Gajos	2	0	0	2
7	FW	8	(Poland)	Paweł Tomczyk	2	0	0	2
7	MF	19	(Poland)	Tomasz Cywka	1	0	1	2
7	MF	36	(Poland)	Filip Marchwiński	2	0	0	2
7	Own goal				2	0	0	2
13	DF	2	(Poland)	Robert Gumny	1	0	0	1
13	DF	4	(Norway)	Thomas Rogne	1	0	0	1
13	DF	22	(Ukraine)	Volodymyr Kostevych	1	0	0	1
13	MF	34	(Poland)	Tymoteusz Klupś	1	0	0	1
13	DF	37	(Poland)	Marcin Wasielewski	1	0	0	1
13	FW	11	(Russia)	Timur Zhamaletdinov	1	0	0	1
TOTALS					49	1	8	58

=== Clean sheets ===
As of 19 May 2019.

Place	Number	Nation	Name	Ekstraklasa	Polish Cup	UEL	Total
1	1	(Bosnia and Herzegovina)	Jasmin Burić	7	0	1	8
2	30	(Slovakia)	Matúš Putnocký	2	1	0	3
3	31	(Poland)	Krzysztof Bąkowski	–	–	–	–
3	33	(Poland)	Karol Szymański	–	–	–	–
TOTALS				9	1	1	11

=== Disciplinary record ===
As of 19 May 2019.

Number	Position	Nation	Name	Ekstraklasa			Polish Cup			UEL			Total		
Number	Position	Nation	Name	Booked	(yellow card) (yellow-red card)	Sent off (straight red)	Booked	(yellow card) (yellow-red card)	Sent off (straight red)	Booked	(yellow card) (yellow-red card)	Sent off (straight red)	Booked	(yellow card) (yellow-red card)	Sent off (straight red)
1	GK	(Bosnia and Herzegovina)	Jasmin Burić	1	0	0	0	0	0	0	0	0	1	0	0
2	DF	(Poland)	Robert Gumny	4	0	0	0	0	0	–			4	0	0
3	DF	(Argentina)	Vernon De Marco	3	0	0	0	0	0	1	0	0	4	0	0
4	DF	(Norway)	Thomas Rogne	2	0	0	0	0	0	1	0	0	3	0	0
5	DF	(Greece)	Dimitrios Goutas	1	0	0	0	0	0	–			1	0	0
6	MF	(Poland)	Łukasz Trałka	8	0	0	2	0	0	1	0	0	11	0	0
7	MF	(Poland)	Maciej Gajos	2	0	0	0	0	0	0	0	0	2	0	0
10	MF	(Switzerland)	Darko Jevtić	2	0	0	–			0	0	0	2	0	0
11	FW	(Russia)	Timur Zhamaletdinov	1	0	0	–						1	0	0
13	DF	(Montenegro)	Nikola Vujadinović	3	0	0	–			0	0	0	3	0	0
16	MF	(Poland)	Juliusz Letniowski	–									0	0	0
17	MF	(Poland)	Maciej Makuszewski	4	0	0	–			3	0	0	7	0	0
18	MF	(Romania)	Mihai Răduț	3	0	0	0	0	0	0	0	0	3	0	0
19	MF	(Poland)	Tomasz Cywka	2	0	0	1	0	0	1	0	0	4	0	0
20	MF	(Poland)	Mateusz Skrzypczak	2	0	0	–						2	0	0
21	FW	(Poland)	Krzysztof Kołodziej	0	0	0	–						0	0	0
22	DF	(Ukraine)	Volodymyr Kostevych	1	0	0	1	0	0	1	0	0	3	0	0
24	MF	(Portugal)	João Amaral	3	0	0	0	0	0	0	0	0	3	0	0
25	MF	(Portugal)	Pedro Tiba	7	0	0	0	0	0	3	0	0	10	0	0
26	DF	(Poland)	Rafał Janicki	4	0	0	0	0	0	0	0	0	4	0	0
29	MF	(Poland)	Kamil Jóźwiak	3	0	0	0	0	0	1	0	0	4	0	0
30	GK	(Slovakia)	Matúš Putnocký	0	0	0	0	0	0	0	0	0	0	0	0
31	GK	(Poland)	Krzysztof Bąkowski	–									0	0	0
32	FW	(Denmark)	Christian Gytkjær	2	0	0	0	0	0	0	0	0	2	0	0
33	GK	(Poland)	Karol Szymański	–									0	0	0
34	MF	(Poland)	Tymoteusz Klupś	0	0	0	0	0	0	–			0	0	0
35	DF	(Poland)	Wiktor Pleśnierowicz	–									0	0	0
36	MF	(Poland)	Filip Marchwiński	1	0	0	–						1	0	0
37	DF	(Poland)	Marcin Wasielewski	3	0	0	–						3	0	0
77	DF	(Poland)	Piotr Tomasik	0	0	0	0	0	0	0	0	0	0	0	0
Players who appeared for Lech and left the club during the season:
8	FW	(Poland)	Paweł Tomczyk	2	0	0	–			0	0	0	2	0	0
11	FW	(Spain)	Dioni Villalba	0	0	0	0	0	0	–			0	0	0
14	FW	(Poland)	Hubert Sobol	0	0	0	–						0	0	0
23	MF	(Sweden)	Nicklas Bärkroth	–						0	0	0	0	0	0
28	DF	(Poland)	Maciej Orłowski	1	0	0	–			0	0	0	1	0	0
TOTALS				65	0	0	4	0	0	12	0	0	81	0	0
