= 2024–25 Warta Poznań season =

Warta Poznań
2024–25 season
- Owner: Bartłomiej Farjaszewski
- Chairman: Artur Meissner
- Manager: Piotr Jacek (until 22 August); Jędrzej Łągiewka & Daniel Ledzion (interim; 22 August – 27 August); Piotr Klepczarek (27 August – 10 March); Ryszard Tarasiewicz (from 10 March)
- Stadium: Respect Energy Stadium
- I liga: 13th
- Polish Cup: Round of 32
- Top goalscorer: League: Kacper Michalski (3); All: Kacper Michalski (3)
- Biggest win: Six one-goal wins
- Biggest defeat: Stal Rzeszów 4–0 Warta (17 August 2024); Wisła Płock 4–0 Warta (8 December 2024)
Home colours	Away colours
- All statistics correct as of 10 December 2024.

The 2024–25 season is the 113th season in the history of Warta Poznań, and the club's first season back in I liga. In addition to the domestic league, the team participated in the Polish Cup.

== Friendlies ==
=== Pre-season ===
29 June 2024 Friendly	Warta Poznań (Poland)	1–0	(Poland) Chrobry Głogów	Poznań
				Stadium: Warta Poznań Stadium

6 July 2024 Friendly	Warta Poznań (Poland)	1–2	(Czech Republic) FC Baník Ostrava B	Grodzisk Wielkopolski
11:00	Żurawski 45'		Holaň 52'; Jaroň 62' (pen.)	Stadium: Stadion Respect Energy

10 July 2024 Friendly	Warta Poznań (Poland)	1–4	(Czech Republic) Teplice	Opalenica, Poland
17:30				Stadium: Hotel Remes Sport & Spa

== Competitions ==
=== Overall record ===
Competition	First match	Last match	Starting round	Record							
Competition	First match	Last match	Starting round	Pld	W	D	L	GF	GA	GD	Win %
I liga	20 July 2024	25–26 May 2025	Matchday 1	19	5	4	10	14	31	−17	26.32
Polish Cup	24 September 2024	31 October 2024	First round	2	1	0	1	1	3	−2	50.00
Total				21	6	4	11	15	34	−19	28.57

Last updated: 10 December 2024
Source: Soccerway

=== I liga ===
==== League table ====
Pos	Team	Pld	W	D	L	GF	GA	GD	Pts	Promotion or Relegation
14	Odra Opole	34	7	9	18	31	61	−30	30 (Note: Ranked based on head-to-head points: Odra Opole 6 pts, Pogoń Siedlce 0 pts.)	
15	Pogoń Siedlce	34	7	9	18	38	53	−15	30	
16	Kotwica Kołobrzeg (Note: MKP Kotwica were denied a license to compete in the 2025–26 II liga. Then they ceased its activities and was not registered at any league level in the following season. At the same time, MKS Kotwica appeared in the regional league, but it is a different legal entity, even though supporters refer to it as the continuation of the club’s traditions.) (R)	34	6	11	17	29	55	−26	29	Relegation, then dissolution
17	Warta Poznań (R)	34	6	6	22	22	56	−34	24	Relegation to II liga
18	Stal Stalowa Wola (R)	34	4	11	19	27	65	−38	23	Relegation to II liga

Source: 1liga.org, 90minut.pl
Rules for classification: 1) Points; 2) Head-to-head points; 3) Head-to-head goal difference; 4) Goal difference; 6) Goals scored; 7) Number of wins; 8) Number of away wins.
(Note: Head-to-head record is used only after all the matches between the teams in question have been played)
(R) Relegated
Notes:

Semi-finals; 29 May 2025
3	Wisła Płock	2
6	Polonia Warsaw	1
4	Wisła Kraków	0
5	Miedź Legnica	1

Final; 1 June 2025
3	Wisła Płock	2
5	Miedź Legnica	0

==== Results summary ====
Overall								Home						Away					
Pld	W	D	L	GF	GA	GD	Pts	W	D	L	GF	GA	GD	W	D	L	GF	GA	GD
19	5	4	10	14	31	−17	19	3	1	5	9	14	−5	2	3	5	5	17	−12

Last updated: 10 December 2024.
Source: 90minut.pl

==== Results by round ====
Round	1	2	3	4
Ground	A	H	A	H
Result	L	L	D	W
Position	18	18	16	11

Updated to match(es) played on 10 August 2024. Source:
A = Away; H = Home; W = Win; D = Draw; L = Loss

==== Matches ====
The match schedule was released on 12 June 2024.

21 July 2024 1	Termalica Nieciecza	3–0	Warta Poznań	Nieciecza
14:30	Trubeha 54', 66'; Putivtsev 90+1'		Wojcinowicz (yellow card) 77' (yellow-red card) 81'	Stadium: Stadion Sportowy Bruk-Bet Termalica; Referee: Albert Różycki

27 July 2024 2	Warta Poznań	1–2	Wisła Płock	Poznań
19:35	Pleśnierowicz 22'		Jiménez Rodríguez 54'; Kocyła (yellow card) 57'; Kun 66'; Pacheco (yellow card) 89'	Stadium: Warta Poznań Stadium; Referee: Piotr Urban

2 August 2024 3	GKS Tychy	1–1	Warta Poznań	Tychy
18:00	Żytek 39'; Budnicki (yellow card) 72' (yellow-red card) 90+10'		Firlej 90'	Stadium: Tychy Stadium; Referee: Paweł Pskit

10 August 2024 4	Warta Poznań	1–0	Stal Stalowa Wola	Poznań
17:00	Adamski 8' (pen.), (penalty missed) 56'			Stadium: Warta Poznań Stadium; Referee: Sebastian Krasny

=== Polish Cup ===
24 September 2024 First round	Wisła Płock	0–1	Warta Poznań	Płock
18:00 CEST (UTC+02:00)		90minut	Kocyła 59' (o.g.)	Stadium: Kazimierz Górski Orlen Stadium; Attendance: 4,013; Referee: Wojciech Myć (Lublin)

31 October 2024 Round of 32	Warta Poznań	0–3	Zagłębie Lubin	Grodzisk Wielkopolski
17:30 CET (UTC+01:00)		90minut	Grzybek 24'; Nalepa 72'; Jach 89'	Stadium: Respect Energy Stadium; Attendance: 753; Referee: Piotr Urban (Warsaw)
