= Edmundsson =

Edmundsson is a Faroese surname. Notable people with the surname include:

- Andrias Edmundsson (born 2000), Faroese footballer
- Jóan Símun Edmundsson (born 1991), Faroese footballer
