= Jakub Bieroński =

Polish footballer

Personal information
- Date of birth: 18 April 2003 (age 23)
- Place of birth: Bielsko-Biała, Poland
- Height: 1.90 m (6 ft 3 in)
- Position: Midfielder

Team information
- Current team: Unia Skierniewice

Youth career
- –2013: Rekord Bielsko-Biała
- 2013–2019: Podbeskidzie

Senior career*
Years	Team	Apps	(Gls)
2019–2023	Podbeskidzie	62	(3)
2023–2026	GKS Tychy	68	(4)
2026–	Unia Skierniewice	0	(0)

International career
2021	Poland U19	2	(0)
2022	Poland U20	2	(0)
- * Club domestic league appearances and goals as of 15:47, 26 May 2026 (UTC)

Jakub Bieroński (born 18 April 2003) is a Polish professional footballer who plays as a midfielder for I liga club Unia Skierniewice.

== Career statistics ==
As of match played 1 March 2026

Appearances and goals by club, season and competition
Club	Season	League			Polish Cup		Continental		Other		Total	
Club	Season	Division	Apps	Goals	Apps	Goals	Apps	Goals	Apps	Goals	Apps	Goals
Podbeskidzie	2018–19	I liga	3	0	0	0	—		—		3	0
Podbeskidzie	2019–20	I liga	5	1	0	0	—		—		5	1
Podbeskidzie	2020–21	Ekstraklasa	15	0	2	0	—		—		17	0
Podbeskidzie	2021–22	I liga	23	1	1	0	—		—		24	1
Podbeskidzie	2022–23	I liga	16	1	1	0	—		—		17	1
Podbeskidzie	Total		62	3	4	0	—		—		66	3
GKS Tychy	2023–24	I liga	21	1	0	0	—		—		21	1
GKS Tychy	2024–25	I liga	28	1	1	0	—		—		29	1
GKS Tychy	2025–26	I liga	19	2	0	0	—		—		19	2
GKS Tychy	Total		68	4	1	0	—		—		69	4
Unia Skierniewice	2026–27	I liga	0	0	0	0	—		—		0	0
Career total			130	7	5	0	0	0	0	0	135	7
