= Mateusz Hołownia =

Polish footballer (born 1998)

Personal information
- Date of birth: 6 May 1998 (age 28)
- Place of birth: Biała Podlaska, Poland
- Height: 1.84 m (6 ft 1/2 in)
- Position: Defender

Team information
- Current team: Górnik Łęczna
- Number: 3

Youth career
- –2009: Niwa Łomazy
- 2009–2011: TOP 54 Biała Podlaska
- 2011–2014: Legia Warsaw

Senior career*
Years	Team	Apps	(Gls)
2014–2021	Legia Warsaw II	55	(4)
2014–2022	Legia Warsaw	22	(1)
2017–2018	→ Ruch Chorzów (loan)	29	(3)
2019	→ Śląsk Wrocław (loan)	13	(0)
2019	→ Śląsk Wrocław II (loan)	4	(1)
2019–2020	→ Wisła Kraków (loan)	9	(0)
2022–2024	Bandırmaspor	5	(0)
2024–2025	GKS Tychy	10	(0)
2026–	Górnik Łęczna	11	(3)

International career
	Poland U15	1	(0)
2013–2014	Poland U16	5	(1)
2014–2015	Poland U17	13	(1)
2015	Poland U18	4	(0)
2016–2017	Poland U19	13	(1)
2017–2019	Poland U20	7	(0)
- * Club domestic league appearances and goals as of 16:02, 26 May 2026 (UTC)

Mateusz Hołownia (born 6 May 1998) is a Polish professional footballer who plays as a defender for II liga club Górnik Łęczna.

== Club career ==
Born in Biała Podlaska, Hołownia started his career with Legia Warsaw. He made his professional debut with the club on 9 July 2014 in the Polish Super Cup against Zawisza Bydgoszcz. He came on as an 89th-minute substitute for Bartosz Bereszyński as Legia lost the cup 3–2. In coming on for Legia, Hołownia became the youngest ever player to appear for the club.

On 29 July he was loaned to Ruch Chorzów. On 7 February 2019, he was then loaned out to Śląsk Wrocław for the rest of the season.

== International career ==
Hołownia has appeared for numerous Poland youth international sides.

== Career statistics ==
As of match played 24 May 2026

Appearances and goals by club, season and competition
Club	Season	League			National cup (Note: Includes Polish Cup, Turkish Cup)		Europe		Other		Total	
Club	Season	Division	Apps	Goals	Apps	Goals	Apps	Goals	Apps	Goals	Apps	Goals
Legia Warsaw II	2014–15	III liga, gr. A	7	0	—		—		—		7	0
Legia Warsaw II	2015–16	III liga, gr. A	19	1	—		—		—		19	1
Legia Warsaw II	2016–17	III liga, gr. I	21	0	—		—		—		21	0
Legia Warsaw II	2018–19	III liga, gr. I	4	2	—		—		—		4	2
Legia Warsaw II	2020–21	III liga, gr. I	2	1	—		—		—		2	1
Legia Warsaw II	2021–22	III liga, gr. I	2	0	—		—		—		2	0
Legia Warsaw II	Total		55	4	—		—		—		55	4
Legia Warsaw	2014–15	Ekstraklasa	0	0	0	0	0	0	1 (Note: Appearance in Polish Super Cup)	0	1	0
Legia Warsaw	2018–19	Ekstraklasa	3	0	1	0	1 (Note: Appearance in UEFA Europa League)	0	—		5	0
Legia Warsaw	2020–21	Ekstraklasa	9	0	2	0	0	0	0	0	11	0
Legia Warsaw	2021–22	Ekstraklasa	10	1	2	0	7 (Note: Four appearances in UEFA Champions League, three appearances in UEFA Europa League)	0	1	0	20	1
Legia Warsaw	Total		22	1	5	0	8	0	2	0	37	1
Ruch Chorzów (loan)	2017–18	I liga	29	3	0	0	—		—		29	3
Śląsk Wrocław (loan)	2018–19	Ekstraklasa	8	0	—		—		—		8	0
Śląsk Wrocław (loan)	2019–20	Ekstraklasa	5	0	1	0	—		—		6	0
Śląsk Wrocław (loan)	Total		13	0	1	0	—		—		14	0
Śląsk Wrocław II (loan)	2018–19	III liga, gr. III	4	1	—		—		—		4	1
Wisła Kraków (loan)	2019–20	Ekstraklasa	9	0	—		—		—		9	0
Bandirmaspor	2022–23	TFF 1. Lig	5	0	1	0	—		—		6	0
Bandirmaspor	2023–24	TFF 1. Lig	0	0	0	0	—		—		0	0
Bandirmaspor	Total		5	0	1	0	—		—		6	0
GKS Tychy	2024–25	I liga	10	0	1	1	—		—		11	1
Górnik Łęczna	2025–26	I liga	11	3	—		—		—		11	3
Career total			158	12	8	1	8	0	2	0	176	13

== Honours ==
Legia Warsaw

- Ekstraklasa: 2020–21
