= Marcel Błachewicz =

Polish footballer (born 2003)

Personal information
- Date of birth: 6 May 2003 (age 23)
- Place of birth: Włocławek, Poland
- Height: 1.85 m (6 ft 1 in)
- Position: Left-back

Team information
- Current team: ŁKS Łódź

Youth career
- Lider Włocławek
- WAPN Warsaw
- 2012–2017: Legia Warsaw
- 2017–2021: Escola Varsovia

Senior career*
Years	Team	Apps	(Gls)
2021–2023	Wisła Płock	7	(0)
2022–2023	→ Bruk-Bet Termalica (loan)	26	(2)
2023–2026	GKS Tychy	83	(8)
2026–	ŁKS Łódź	0	(0)

International career
2021	Poland U19	3	(0)
2023	Poland U20	4	(1)
2022	Poland U21	1	(0)
- * Club domestic league appearances and goals as of 15:48, 26 May 2026 (UTC)

Marcel Błachewicz (born 6 May 2003) is a Polish professional footballer who plays as a left-back for I liga club ŁKS Łódź.

== Career statistics ==
As of match played 3 May 2026

Appearances and goals by club, season and competition
Club	Season	League			Polish Cup		Europe		Other		Total	
Club	Season	Division	Apps	Goals	Apps	Goals	Apps	Goals	Apps	Goals	Apps	Goals
Wisła Płock	2021–22	Ekstraklasa	7	0	1	0	—		—		8	0
Bruk-Bet Termalica (loan)	2022–23	I liga	26	2	1	1	—		—		27	3
GKS Tychy	2023–24	I liga	26	3	2	0	—		—		28	3
GKS Tychy	2024–25	I liga	30	2	1	1	—		—		31	3
GKS Tychy	2025–26	I liga	27	3	1	0	—		—		28	3
GKS Tychy	Total		83	8	4	1	—		—		87	9
ŁKS Łódź	2026–27	I liga	0	0	0	0	—		—		0	0
Career total			116	10	6	2	0	0	0	0	122	12
