= Łukasz Sekulski =

Polish footballer

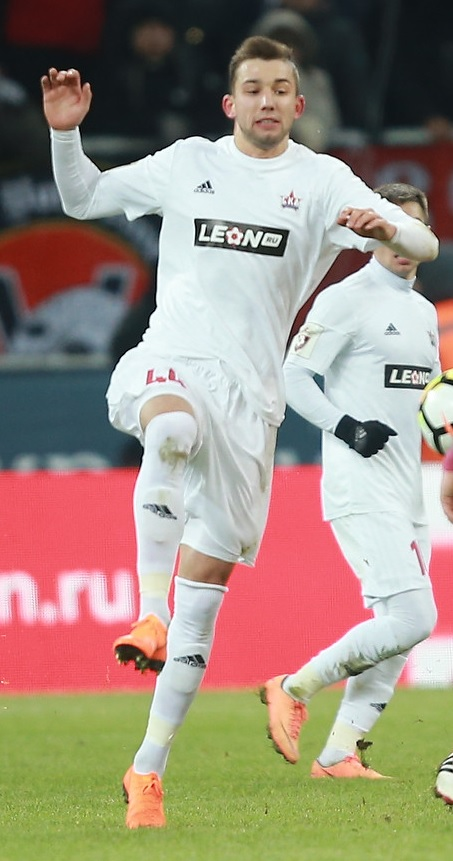
- Sekulski with SKA-Khabarovsk in 2018

Personal information
- Date of birth: 3 November 1990 (age 36)
- Place of birth: Płock, Poland
- Height: 1.87 m (6 ft 2 in)
- Position: Striker

Team information
- Current team: Wisła Płock
- Number: 20

Youth career
- Stoczniowiec Płock

Senior career*
Years	Team	Apps	(Gls)
2007–2014	Wisła Płock	104	(13)
2009–2010	→ Raków Częstochowa (loan)	12	(2)
2014–2015	Stal Stalowa Wola	33	(30)
2015–2018	Jagiellonia Białystok	24	(5)
2016	→ Korona Kielce (loan)	19	(6)
2017	→ Piast Gliwice (loan)	12	(0)
2018	SKA-Khabarovsk	25	(3)
2019–2021	ŁKS Łódź	62	(20)
2021–	Wisła Płock	157	(56)
2025–	Wisła Płock II	1	(0)
- * Club domestic league appearances and goals as of 01:43, 1 November 2026 (UTC)

Łukasz Sekulski (born 3 November 1990) is a Polish professional footballer who plays as a striker for and captains Ekstraklasa club Wisła Płock. Besides Poland, he has played in Russia.

== Club career ==
He was the top goalscorer in the 2014–15 II liga campaign by scoring 30 goals for Stal Stalowa Wola. In the following season, he was transferred to Ekstraklasa club Jagiellonia Białystok, signing a three-year deal.

On 22 February 2018, he moved to Russian Premier League side FC SKA-Khabarovsk. He left the club at the end of the year and joined ŁKS Łódź on 12 January 2019 on a three-and-a-half-year contract.

== Career statistics ==
As of match played 23 May 2026

Appearances and goals by club, season and competition
Club	Season	League			National cup (Note: Includes Polish Cup, Russian Cup)		Continental		Total	
Club	Season	Division	Apps	Goals	Apps	Goals	Apps	Goals	Apps	Goals
Wisła Płock	2007–08	I liga	2	0	0	0	—		2	0
Wisła Płock	2008–09	I liga	4	0	0	0	—		4	0
Wisła Płock	2009–10	I liga	8	1	0	0	—		8	1
Wisła Płock	2010–11	II liga East	14	1	0	0	—		14	1
Wisła Płock	2011–12	I liga	23	1	2	3	—		25	4
Wisła Płock	2012–13	II liga East	33	10	2	2	—		35	12
Wisła Płock	2013–14	I liga	20	0	0	0	—		20	0
Wisła Płock	Total		104	13	4	5	0	0	108	18
Raków Częstochowa (loan)	2009–10	II liga West	12	2	1	0	—		13	2
Stal Stalowa Wola	2014–15	II liga	33	30	3	1	—		36	31
Jagiellonia Białystok	2015–16	Ekstraklasa	9	1	1	0	4 (Note: Appearances in UEFA Europa League)	0	14	1
Jagiellonia Białystok	2017–18	Ekstraklasa	15	4	1	0	4	1	20	5
Jagiellonia Białystok	Total		24	5	2	0	8	1	34	6
Korona Kielce (loan)	2015–16	Ekstraklasa	9	1	—		—		9	1
Korona Kielce (loan)	2016–17	Ekstraklasa	10	5	0	0	—		10	5
Korona Kielce (loan)	Total		19	6	0	0	0	0	19	6
Piast Gliwice (loan)	2016–17	Ekstraklasa	12	0	—		—		12	0
SKA-Khabarovsk	2017–18	RPL	9	0	0	0	—		9	0
SKA-Khabarovsk	2018–19	RFNL	16	3	1	0	—		17	3
SKA-Khabarovsk	Total		25	3	1	0	0	0	26	3
ŁKS Łódź	2018–19	I liga	11	6	—		—		11	6
ŁKS Łódź	2019–20	Ekstraklasa	21	5	0	0	—		21	5
ŁKS Łódź	2020–21	I liga	30	9	2	0	—		32	9
ŁKS Łódź	Total		62	20	2	0	0	0	64	20
Wisła Płock	2021–22	Ekstraklasa	28	13	1	0	—		29	13
Wisła Płock	2022–23	Ekstraklasa	27	6	1	0	—		28	6
Wisła Płock	2023–24	I liga	32	15	0	0	—		32	15
Wisła Płock	2024–25	I liga	30	11	1	0	2 (Note: Appearances in I liga promotion play-offs)	1	33	12
Wisła Płock	2025–26	Ekstraklasa	27	8	0	0	—		27	8
Wisła Płock	Total		144	53	3	0	2	1	149	54
Wisła Płock II	2024–25	III liga, gr. I	1	0	—		—		1	0
Career total			436	132	16	6	10	2	462	140

== Honours ==
Wisła Płock

- II liga East: 2012–13

Individual

- II liga top scorer: 2014–15
- Polish Union of Footballers' I liga Team of the Season: 2023–24
