= Maciej Orłowski =

Polish footballer

Personal information
- Full name: Maciej Orłowski
- Date of birth: 7 January 1994 (age 32)
- Place of birth: Poznań, Poland
- Height: 5 ft 10 in (1.77 m)
- Position: Right-back

Team information
- Current team: Avia Kamionki; Warta Poznań II & U19 (assistant)

Youth career
- Lech Poznań

Senior career*
Years	Team	Apps	(Gls)
2013–2019	Lech Poznań II	136	(9)
2018–2019	Lech Poznań	2	(0)
2019	→ Górnik Łęczna (loan)	30	(0)
2020–2022	Górnik Łęczna	25	(0)
2022–2023	Radunia Stężyca	39	(0)
2023–2025	Lech Poznań II	36	(0)
2025–	Avia Kamionki	0	(0)
- * Club domestic league appearances and goals as of 18:13, 11 June 2025 (UTC)

Maciej Orłowski (born 7 January 1994) is a Polish professional footballer who plays as a right-back for V liga Greater Poland club Avia Kamionki. He also serves as an assistant coach of Warta Poznań's reserve and under-19 teams.

== Career ==
Orłowski started his career with Lech Poznań, where he served as the reserves team's captain from 2016 until 2018, when he was promoted to the first team.

On 5 February 2019, Orłowski was loaned out to Górnik Łęczna for the rest of 2019. Górnik Łęczna decided to sign him permanently on 16 January 2020.

After 18 months at Radunia Stężyca, on 7 July 2023 Orłowski returned to Lech Poznań II on a two-year deal.

In July 2025, Orłowski moved to sixth tier side Avia Kamionki and began his coaching career as an assistant of Warta Poznań's reserve and under-19 teams.

== Honours ==
Lech Poznań II

- III liga, group II: 2018–19

Górnik Łęczna

- II liga: 2019–20
