= Karol Szymański =

Polish footballer

Personal information
- Date of birth: 25 June 1993 (age 33)
- Place of birth: Szczecinek, Poland
- Height: 1.92 m (6 ft 4 in)
- Position: Goalkeeper

Youth career
- Gwardia Koszalin
- 2006–2009: Bałtyk Koszalin
- 2009–2011: Lech Poznań

Senior career*
Years	Team	Apps	(Gls)
2011–2015	Lech Poznań II	0	(0)
2011–2012	→ Lubuszanin Trzcianka (loan)	23	(0)
2012–2013	→ Lech Rypin (loan)	14	(0)
2013–2014	→ Jarota Jarocin (loan)	32	(0)
2014	→ Chojniczanka Chojnice (loan)	7	(0)
2014–2015	→ Ostrovia Ostrów (loan)	12	(0)
2015	→ Jarota Jarocin (loan)	15	(0)
2015–2017	Chrobry Głogów	20	(0)
2017	Kotwica Kołobrzeg	11	(0)
2017–2018	Polonia Środa Wielkopolska	24	(0)
2018–2020	Lech Poznań	2	(0)
2018–2020	Lech Poznań II	35	(0)
2020–2026	Piast Gliwice	12	(0)
- * Club domestic league appearances and goals as of 21:53, 29 May 2026 (UTC)

Karol Szymański (born 25 June 1993) is a Polish professional footballer who plays as a goalkeeper.

== Club career ==
On 28 July 2020, Szymański signed with Piast Gliwice.

== Honours ==
Polonia Środa Wielkopolska

- Polish Cup (Greater Poland regionals): 2017–18
- Polish Cup (Poznań regionals): 2017–18

Lech Poznań II

- III liga, group II: 2018–19
