= Mamin Sanyang =

Gambian footballer

Personal information
- Full name: Mamin Sanyang
- Date of birth: 6 February 2003 (age 23)
- Place of birth: Brikama, The Gambia
- Height: 1.68 m (5 ft 6 in)
- Positions: Winger; wing-back

Team information
- Current team: Dila Gori

Youth career
- 2015–2018: 1. FC Heidenheim
- 2018–2020: TSG Hoffenheim
- 2020–2022: Bayern Munich

Senior career*
Years	Team	Apps	(Gls)
2022–2023	Bayern Munich II	20	(1)
2023–2024	Hannover 96 II	10	(1)
2024–2026	GKS Tychy	25	(3)
2026–	Dila Gori	10	(1)

International career
2021	Germany U19	1	(0)
2023	Gambia U20	8	(1)
- * Club domestic league appearances and goals as of 20:24, 27 May 2026 (UTC)

Mamin Sanyang (born 6 February 2003) is a Gambian professional footballer who plays as a winger and wing-back for Erovnuli Liga club Dila Gori.

== Early life ==
Sanyang was born in Brikama, The Gambia. His family moved to Germany as refugees in 2013 and settled in Baden-Württemberg. Then he joined the youth academy of local 2. Bundesliga club 1. FC Heidenheim. After three seasons there, he moved to the academy of Bundesliga club TSG Hoffenheim.

== Career ==
In June 2020, Sanyang signed for Bayern Munich at the age of seventeen, joining the under-19 squad. He signed a three-year contract with Bayern Munich. On 16 July 2022, he made his debut for Bayern Munich II in a Regionalliga Bayern match against VfB Eichstätt.

On 23 June 2023, Sanyang signed with 2. Bundesliga club Hannover 96 as a free agent, set to initially join the reserve team.

On 5 July 2024, Sanyang joined Polish I liga club GKS Tychy on a two-year deal, with an option for a further year. He left GKS by mutual consent on 3 February 2026.

On 1 April 2026, Sanyang moved to Georgian Erovnuli Liga side Dila Gori.

== Style of play ==
Sanyang is said to operate on the right flank, able to operate both offensively and defensively. He has been described as a winger, but also a wing-back. It has been said that he could possess "the guile and creativity to play behind a central striker".

== International career ==
Sanyang is eligible to play for either Gambia or Germany. On 6 September 2021, he represented Germany U19s against England U19s in a 1–1 draw. However, he later declared for Gambia. In February 2023, Sanyang was called up to the Gambia national under-20 football team for the 2023 Africa U-20 Cup of Nations tournament, held in Egypt in February and March 2023. He made his debut for Gambia U20s during the AFCON tournament against Zambia U20s.
