= Julius Ertlthaler =

Austrian footballer

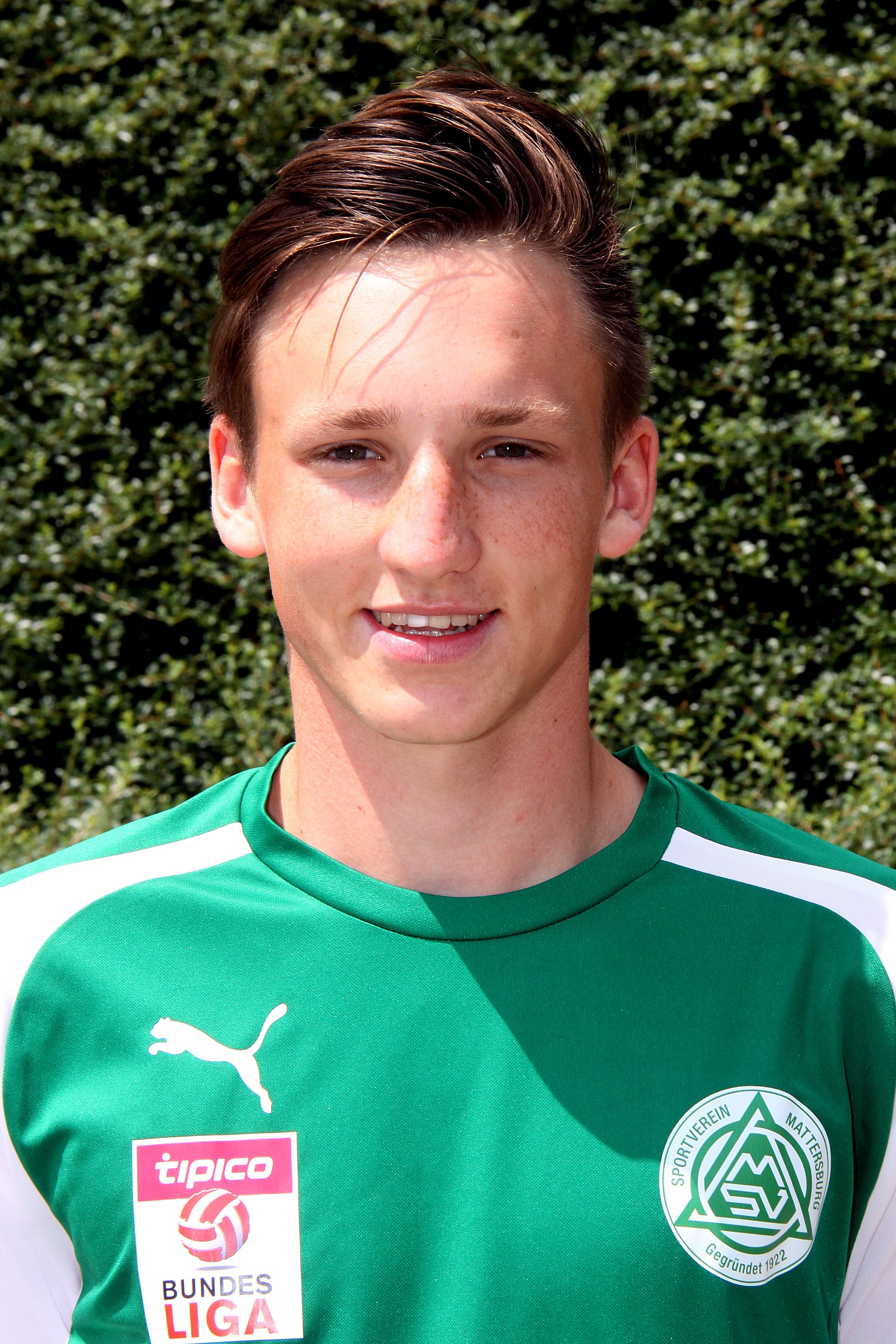
- Ertlthaler with SV Mattersburg in 2015

Personal information
- Full name: Julius Konrad Ertlthaler
- Date of birth: 25 April 1997 (age 29)
- Place of birth: Vienna, Austria
- Height: 1.69 m (5 ft 7 in)
- Position: Midfielder

Team information
- Current team: Wisła Kraków
- Number: 7

Youth career
- 2006–2010: ASV Pöttsching
- 2010–2011: SV Mattersburg
- 2011–2014: AKA Burgenland

Senior career*
Years	Team	Apps	(Gls)
2013–2020	SV Mattersburg II	43	(4)
2014–2020	SV Mattersburg	56	(0)
2020–2021	TSV Hartberg	26	(1)
2022–2024	WSG Tirol	50	(5)
2024–2025	GKS Tychy	43	(10)
2025–	Wisła Kraków	43	(6)

International career
2018	Austria U21	3	(0)
- * Club domestic league appearances and goals as of 21:19, 25 October 2026 (UTC)

Julius Konrad Ertlthaler (born 25 April 1997) is an Austrian professional footballer who plays as a midfielder for Ekstraklasa club Wisła Kraków.

== Club career ==
On 13 August 2020, Ertlthaler signed with TSV Hartberg.

On 2 February 2022, Ertlthaler signed a two-and-a-half-year contract with WSG Tirol.

On 17 January 2024, he completed his first career move abroad, signing a one-and-a-half-year contract with Polish second-tier club GKS Tychy. He made his debut in the starting line-up for a 2–0 home win over Odra Opole on 16 February.

On 14 June 2025, fellow I liga club Wisła Kraków announced the signing of Ertlthaler on a two-year deal.

== Honours ==
Wisła Kraków

- I liga: 2025–26

Individual

- I liga Player of the Month: April 2025
