= Dawid Kocyła =

Polish footballer

Personal information
- Date of birth: 23 July 2002 (age 24)
- Place of birth: Bełchatów, Poland
- Height: 1.80 m (5 ft 11 in)
- Position: Winger

Team information
- Current team: Arka Gdynia
- Number: 11

Youth career
- –2019: GKS Bełchatów

Senior career*
Years	Team	Apps	(Gls)
2019	GKS Bełchatów	15	(3)
2020–2024	Wisła Płock	108	(12)
2022	→ Bruk-Bet Termalica (loan)	13	(0)
2025–	Arka Gdynia	45	(3)

International career
2019–2020	Poland U19	4	(1)
2021–2022	Poland U20	5	(0)
2021–2022	Poland U21	3	(0)
- * Club domestic league appearances and goals as of 17:45, 25 May 2026 (UTC)

Dawid Kocyła (Polish pronunciation: [ˈdavid kɔˈt͜sɨwa]; born 23 July 2002) is a Polish professional footballer who plays as a winger for I liga club Arka Gdynia.

== Career statistics ==
As of match played 23 May 2026

Appearances and goals by club, season and competition
Club	Season	League			Polish Cup		Europe		Other		Total	
Club	Season	Division	Apps	Goals	Apps	Goals	Apps	Goals	Apps	Goals	Apps	Goals
GKS Bełchatów	2019–20	I liga	15	0	0	0	—		—		15	3
Wisła Płock	2019–20	Ekstraklasa	11	3	—		—		—		11	3
Wisła Płock	2020–21	Ekstraklasa	27	4	2	0	—		—		29	4
Wisła Płock	2021–24	Ekstraklasa	11	0	1	0	—		—		12	0
Wisła Płock	2022–24	Ekstraklasa	20	2	1	1	—		—		21	3
Wisła Płock	2023–24	I liga	23	3	1	0	—		—		24	3
Wisła Płock	2024–25	I liga	16	0	1	0	—		—		17	0
Wisła Płock	Total		108	12	6	1	—		—		114	13
Bruk-Bet Termalica (loan)	2022–23	Ekstraklasa	13	0	—		—		—		13	0
Arka Gdynia	2024–25	I liga	14	0	—		—		—		14	0
Arka Gdynia	2025–26	Ekstraklasa	31	3	2	0	—		—		33	3
Arka Gdynia	Total		45	3	2	0	—		—		47	3
Career total			181	18	8	1	0	0	0	0	189	19

== Honours ==
Wisła Płock II

- IV liga Masovia: 2023–24

Arka Gdynia

- I liga: 2024–25
