= Jakub Szymański (footballer, born 2002) =

Polish footballer

Personal information
- Full name: Jakub Szymański
- Date of birth: 5 July 2002 (age 24)
- Place of birth: Opoczno, Poland
- Height: 1.89 m (6 ft 2 in)
- Position: Centre-back

Team information
- Current team: Polonia Bytom
- Number: 77

Youth career
- –2018: Ceramika Opoczno
- 2018–2019: MKS Polonia Warsaw

Senior career*
| Years | Team | Apps | (Gls) |
| 2019–2020 | MKS Polonia Warsaw | 3 | (0) |
| 2020–2023 | Górnik Zabrze II | 49 | (1) |
| 2021–2023 | Górnik Zabrze | 14 | (0) |
| 2023–2025 | Wisła Płock | 41 | (0) |
| 2023–2025 | Wisła Płock II | 3 | (0) |
| 2025– | Polonia Bytom | 30 | (1) |

International career
| 2022 | Poland U20 | 6 | (0) |
| 2023–2024 | Poland U21 | 4 | (0) |
- * Club domestic league appearances and goals as of 08:51, 27 May 2026 (UTC)

Jakub Szymański (born 5 July 2002) is a Polish professional footballer who plays as a centre-back for I liga club Polonia Bytom.

== Career statistics ==
As of match played 24 May 2026

Appearances and goals by club, season and competition
| Club | Season | League | | | Polish Cup | | Europe | | Other | | Total | |
| Club | Season | Division | Apps | Goals | Apps | Goals | Apps | Goals | Apps | Goals | Apps | Goals |
|---|---|---|---|---|---|---|---|---|---|---|---|---|
| MKS Polonia Warsaw | 2019–20 | Klasa B | 3 | 0 | — | | — | | — | | 3 | 0 |
| Górnik Zabrze II | 2020–21 | III liga, gr. III | 30 | 0 | — | | — | | — | | 30 | 0 |
| Górnik Zabrze II | 2021–22 | III liga, gr. III | 10 | 1 | — | | — | | — | | 10 | 1 |
| Górnik Zabrze II | 2022–23 | III liga, gr. III | 9 | 0 | — | | — | | — | | 9 | 0 |
| Górnik Zabrze II | Total | | 49 | 1 | — | | — | | — | | 49 | 1 |
| Górnik Zabrze | 2021–22 | Ekstraklasa | 11 | 0 | 4 | 0 | — | | — | | 15 | 0 |
| Górnik Zabrze | 2022–23 | Ekstraklasa | 3 | 0 | 1 | 0 | — | | — | | 4 | 0 |
| Górnik Zabrze | Total | | 14 | 0 | 5 | 0 | — | | — | | 19 | 0 |
| Wisła Płock | 2022–23 | Ekstraklasa | 6 | 0 | — | | — | | — | | 6 | 0 |
| Wisła Płock | 2023–24 | I liga | 20 | 0 | 0 | 0 | — | | — | | 20 | 0 |
| Wisła Płock | 2024–25 | I liga | 13 | 0 | 1 | 0 | — | | 2 (Note: Appearances in I liga promotion play-offs) | 0 | 16 | 0 |
| Wisła Płock | Total | | 39 | 0 | 1 | 0 | — | | 2 | 0 | 42 | 0 |
| Wisła Płock II | 2023–24 | IV liga Masovia | 1 | 0 | — | | — | | — | | 1 | 0 |
| Wisła Płock II | 2024–25 | III liga, gr. I | 2 | 0 | — | | — | | — | | 2 | 0 |
| Wisła Płock II | Total | | 3 | 0 | — | | — | | 2 | 0 | 3 | 0 |
| Polonia Bytom | 2025–26 | I liga | 30 | 1 | 3 | 0 | — | | — | | 33 | 1 |
| Career total | | | 138 | 2 | 9 | 0 | 0 | 0 | 2 | 0 | 149 | 2 |

== Honours ==
MKS Polonia Warsaw

- Klasa B Warsaw III: 2019–20

Górnik Zabrze II

- Polish Cup (Zabrze regionals): 2020–21

Wisła Płock II

- IV liga Masovia: 2023–24
