= Andrias Edmundsson =

Faroese footballer (born 2000)

Personal information
- Date of birth: 18 December 2000 (age 25)
- Place of birth: Toftir, Faroe Islands
- Height: 1.93 m (6 ft 4 in)
- Position: Centre-back

Team information
- Current team: Hellas Verona
- Number: 5

Youth career
- –2017: B68 Toftir
- 2017–2020: Sunderland

Senior career*
Years	Team	Apps	(Gls)
2016–2017	B68 Toftir	9	(0)
2017–2020	Sunderland	0	(0)
2020–2023	Águilas	33	(0)
2023–2024	Chojniczanka Chojnice	25	(0)
2024–2026	Wisła Płock	46	(2)
2026–	Hellas Verona	15	(0)

International career^{‡}
2017	Faroe Islands U17	6	(0)
2017–2018	Faroe Islands U19	11	(0)
2019–2021	Faroe Islands U21	6	(0)
2022–	Faroe Islands	27	(0)
- * Club domestic league appearances and goals as of 25 May 2026 ‡ National team caps and goals as of 16 November 2026

Andrias Edmundsson (born 18 December 2000) is a Faroese professional footballer who plays as a centre-back for Serie B club Hellas Verona and the Faroe Islands national team.

== Club career ==
Andrias started his career at hometown club B68 Toftir, making his debut at age 17 in a 6–1 Faroe Islands Cup loss to Víkingur Gøta. He joined the Sunderland youth academy in 2017. In 2020, he joined Águilas on a free transfer, and spent three years at the club. On 26 July 2023, Andrias joined Polish third division club Chojniczanka Chojnice on a one-year deal, with an extension option for another year.

On 20 June 2024, he moved to Wisła Płock on a two-year deal, with an option for a further year with which he gained promotion from I liga to the Ekstraklasa.

On 2 February 2026, Hellas Verona and Wisła Płock reached an agreement, and Andrias was unveiled as a new signing, becoming the first Faroese player to play in Serie A. According to Wisła Płock, Andrias was sold for a reported 2,5 million Euros, making him the most expensive Faroese footballer by far. He made his debut four days later, playing the entire match in a goalless draw against Pisa.

== International career ==
Andrias made his senior international debut for the Faroe Islands national team on 19 November 2022, in a 1–1 draw with Kosovo.

== Personal life ==
Andrias comes from a sporting family; his brothers, Jóan Símun and Hakun, both are professional footballers.

== Career statistics ==
=== Club ===
As of 6 February 2026

Appearances and goals by club, season and competition
Club	Season	League			National cup (Note: Includes Faroe Islands Cup, Copa del Rey, Polish Cup)		Continental		Other		Total	
Club	Season	Division	Apps	Goals	Apps	Goals	Apps	Goals	Apps	Goals	Apps	Goals
B68 Toftir	2017	1. deild	9	0	1	0	—		—		10	0
Águilas	2021–22	Segunda Federación	3	0	1	0	—		—		4	0
Chojniczanka Chojnice	2023–24	II liga	25	0	2	0	—		1 (Note: Appearance in II liga promotion play-offs)	0	28	0
Wisła Płock	2024–25	I liga	28	1	1	0	—		2 (Note: Appearances in I liga promotion play-offs)	1	31	2
Wisła Płock	2025–26	Ekstraklasa	18	1	1	0	—		—		19	1
Wisła Płock	Total		46	2	2	0	0	0	2	1	50	3
Hellas Verona	2025–26	Serie A	2	0	—		—		—		2	0
Career total			84	2	6	0	0	0	3	1	93	3

=== International ===
As of match played 16 November 2026

Appearances and goals by national team and year
National team	Year	Apps	Goals
Faroe Islands
Faroe Islands	2022	1	0
Faroe Islands	2023	4	0
Faroe Islands	2024	8	0
Faroe Islands	2025	8	0
Faroe Islands	2026	6	0
Total		27	0
