= Piotr Krawczyk =

Polish footballer

Personal information
- Date of birth: 29 December 1994 (age 31)
- Place of birth: Siedlce, Poland
- Height: 1.88 m (6 ft 2 in)
- Position: Forward

Team information
- Current team: Resovia
- Number: 27

Youth career
- –2011: Naprzód Skórzec

Senior career*
Years	Team	Apps	(Gls)
2011–2014	Naprzód Skórzec		
2013–2014	→ Pogoń Siedlce (loan)	4	(0)
2014–2018	Pogoń Siedlce	48	(0)
2016	→ Świt NDM (loan)	17	(4)
2018	→ Orlęta Radzyń Podlaski (loan)	15	(1)
2018–2019	Legionovia Legionowo	34	(26)
2019–2024	Górnik Zabrze	114	(15)
2019–2020	Górnik Zabrze II	5	(6)
2024–2025	Wisła Płock	27	(6)
2025	Wisła Płock II	14	(8)
2026	GKS Tychy	12	(1)
2026–	Resovia	0	(0)
- * Club domestic league appearances and goals as of 15:41, 26 May 2026 (UTC)

Piotr Krawczyk (born 29 December 1994) is a Polish professional footballer who plays as a forward for II liga club Resovia.

== Career ==
He signed with Górnik Zabrze on 29 June 2019, earning his first top-flight contract after helping Legionovia Legionowo earn promotion out of the III liga during the 2018–19 season. Krawczyk made his Ekstraklasa debut in August 2019, coming off the bench against Jagiellonia Białystok.

On 9 August 2024, Krawczyk's five-year stint with Górnik came to an end, as he signed a two-year deal with I liga club Wisła Płock.

On 23 December 2025, after terminating his contract with Wisła, Krawczyk moved to second-tier side GKS Tychy on an eighteen-month deal. He was released in June 2026 after GKS' relegation to the II liga.

On 1 September 2026, Krawczyk joined Resovia in the third division on a one-year deal.

== Honours ==
Naprzód Skórzec

- Regional league Siedlce: 2012–13
- Polish Cup (Siedlce regionals): 2012–13

Świt Nowy Dwór Mazowiecki

- Polish Cup (Masovia regionals): 2015–16

Orlęta Radzyń Podlaski

- Polish Cup (Biała Podlaska regionals): 2017–18

Legionovia Legionowo

- III liga, group I: 2018–19
