= Wiktor Pleśnierowicz =

Polish footballer

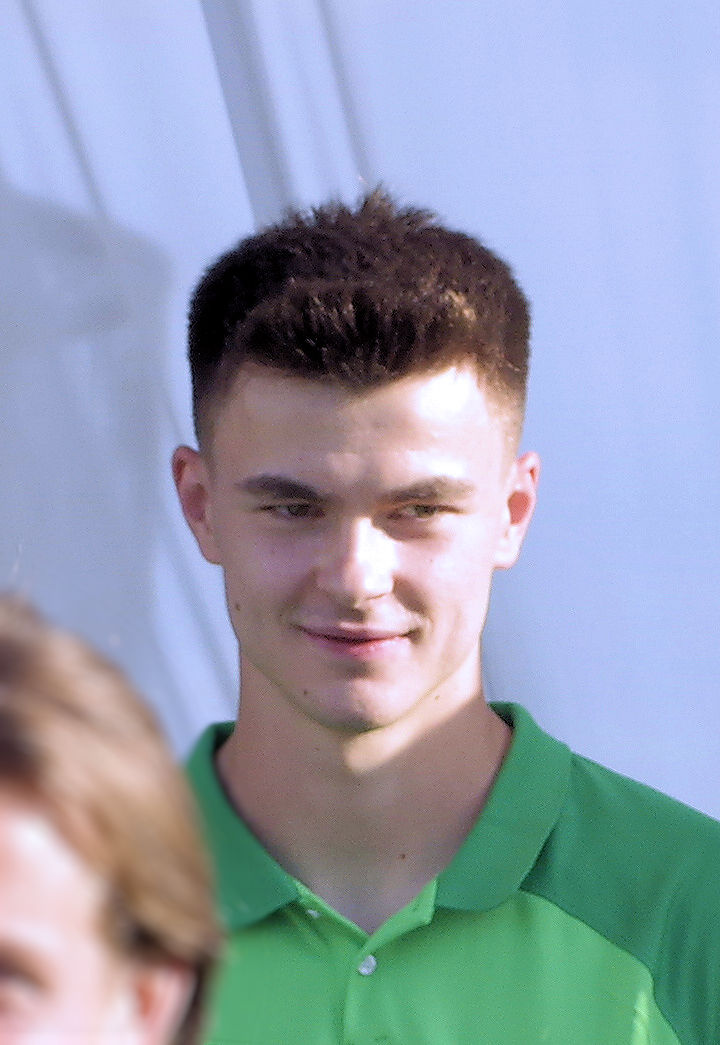
- Pleśnierowicz with Warta Poznań in 2023

Personal information
- Full name: Wiktor Marek Pleśnierowicz
- Date of birth: 29 March 2001 (age 25)
- Place of birth: Kalisz, Poland
- Height: 1.84 m (6 ft 0 in)
- Position: Centre-back

Team information
- Current team: Sandecja Nowy Sącz
- Number: 3

Youth career
- –2014: Kaliszanin Kalisz
- 2014–2017: Lech Poznań

Senior career*
Years	Team	Apps	(Gls)
2017–2020	Lech Poznań II	30	(1)
2018–2020	Lech Poznań	0	(0)
2019–2020	→ Roma Primavera (loan)		
2020–2021	Miedź Legnica	14	(0)
2020–2021	Miedź Legnica II	8	(1)
2021–2025	Warta Poznań	53	(3)
2024	→ Polonia Warsaw (loan)	12	(0)
2025–	Sandecja Nowy Sącz	24	(3)

International career
2015–2016	Poland U15	2	(1)
2016–2017	Poland U16	5	(0)
2017–2018	Poland U17	14	(0)
2019	Poland U18	3	(0)
2021	Poland U21	1	(0)
- * Club domestic league appearances and goals as of 14:29, 6 June 2026 (UTC)

Wiktor Marek Pleśnierowicz (born 29 March 2001) is a Polish professional footballer who plays as a centre-back for II liga club Sandecja Nowy Sącz.

== Career ==
In 2019, Pleśnierowicz was sent on loan to the youth academy of Italian Serie A side Roma from Lech Poznań in the Polish top flight.

On 18 June 2021, he signed a three-year contract with an option for a one-year extension with Polish Ekstraklasa club Warta Poznań. Shortly after joining his new club, he tore his anterior cruciate ligament and was sidelined for six months.

On 18 February 2024, after losing his spot in Warta's starting line-up at the end of the previous year, Pleśnierowicz joined I liga side Polonia Warsaw on loan for the remainder of the season.

He left Warta at the conclusion of the 2024–25 season.

On 18 September 2025, Pleśnierowicz signed with II liga club Sandecja Nowy Sącz on a one-year deal, with an option to extend.

== Career statistics ==
As of match played 6 June 2026

Appearances and goals by club, season and competition
Club	Season	League			Polish Cup		Europe		Other		Total	
Club	Season	Division	Apps	Goals	Apps	Goals	Apps	Goals	Apps	Goals	Apps	Goals
Lech Poznań II	2017–18	III liga, gr. II	8	1	—		—		—		8	1
Lech Poznań II	2018–19	III liga, gr. II	18	0	—		—		—		18	0
Lech Poznań II	2019–20	II liga	4	0	—		—		—		4	0
Lech Poznań II	Total		30	1	—		—		—		30	1
Miedź Legnica	2020–21	I liga	14	0	0	0	—		—		14	0
Miedź Legnica II	2020–21	III liga, gr. III	8	1	—		—		—		8	1
Warta Poznań	2021–22	Ekstraklasa	0	0	0	0	—		—		0	0
Warta Poznań	2022–23	Ekstraklasa	15	0	2	0	—		—		17	0
Warta Poznań	2023–24	Ekstraklasa	16	0	3	0	—		—		19	0
Warta Poznań	2024–25	I liga	22	3	1	0	—		—		23	3
Warta Poznań	Total		53	3	6	0	—		—		59	3
Polonia Warsaw (loan)	2023–24	I liga	12	0	—		—		—		12	0
Sandecja Nowy Sącz	2025–26	II liga	22	2	—		—		2 (Note: Appearances in II liga promotion play-offs)	1	24	3
Career total			139	7	6	0	0	0	2	1	147	8

== Honours ==
Lech Poznań II

- III liga, group II: 2018–19
