= Marko Dijaković =

Austrian footballer

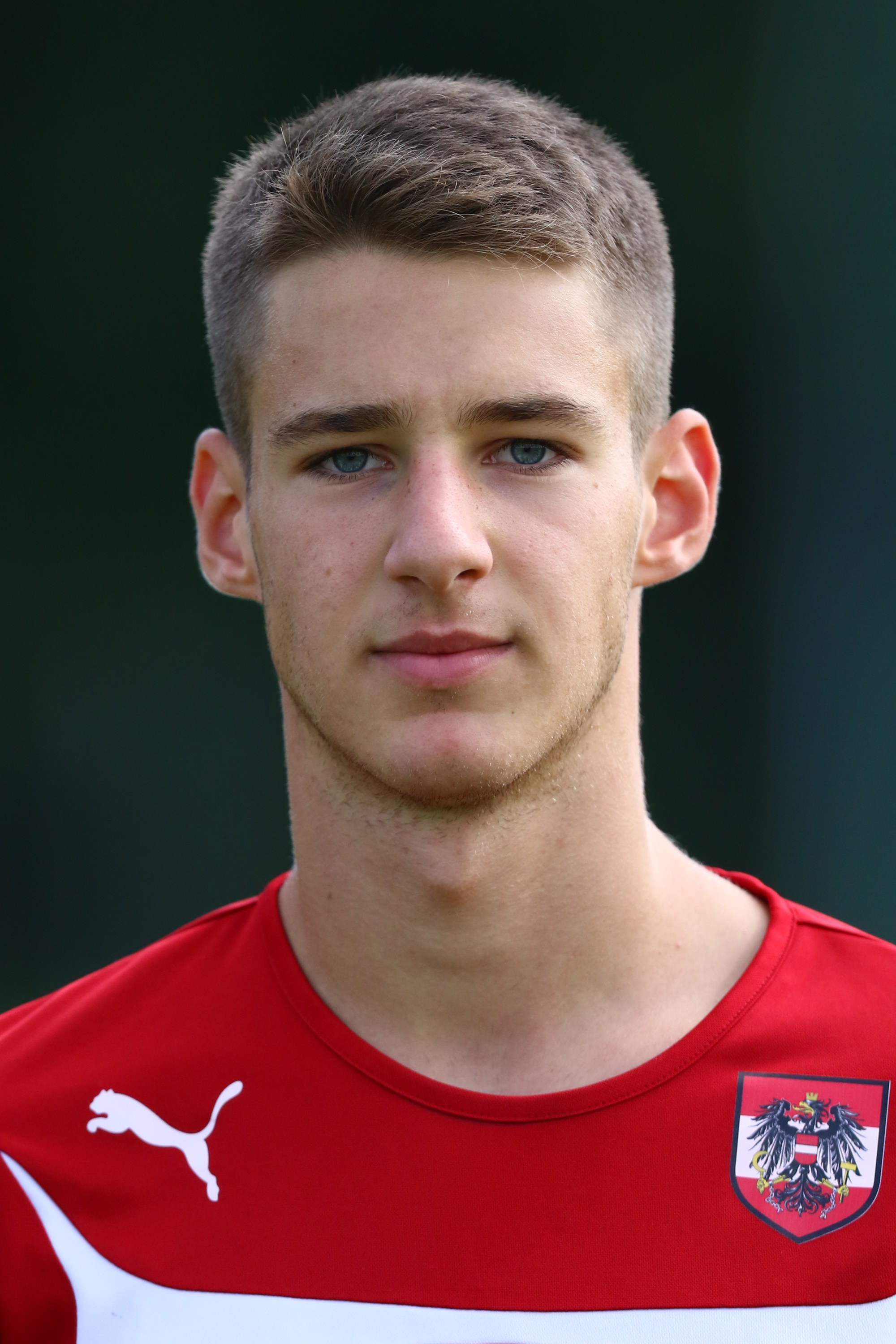
- Dijaković in 2018

Personal information
- Date of birth: 18 March 2002 (age 24)
- Place of birth: Vienna, Austria
- Height: 1.86 m (6 ft 1 in)
- Position: Defender

Team information
- Current team: Śląsk Wrocław
- Number: 4

Youth career
- 2009–2013: Wiener Sport-Club
- 2013–2019: Austria Wien
- 2019–2020: Rapid Wien

Senior career*
Years	Team	Apps	(Gls)
2020–2023	Rapid Wien II	55	(6)
2021–2023	Rapid Wien	2	(0)
2023–2025	GKS Tychy	50	(3)
2025–	Śląsk Wrocław	11	(1)
2026–	Śląsk Wrocław II	1	(0)

International career
2017	Austria U15	5	(0)
2017–2018	Austria U16	8	(2)
2018	Austria U17	1	(0)
2019	Austria U18	4	(1)
- * Club domestic league appearances and goals as of 12:47, 22 November 2026 (UTC)

Marko Dijaković (Serbian Cyrillic: Марко Дијаковић; born 18 March 2002) is an Austrian professional footballer who plays as a defender for Polish club Śląsk Wrocław.

== Club career ==
Dijaković made his professional debut for Rapid Wien on 20 November 2021, coming on as late substitute in a 1–0 Bundesliga win over SCR Altach.

On 8 August 2023, he joined Polish second division side GKS Tychy on a two-year deal, with an option for another year.

On 15 June 2025, Dijaković agreed to a one-year contract, with a one-year extension option, with another I liga club Śląsk Wrocław.

== International career ==
Born in Austria, Dijaković is of Serbian descent. He was a youth international for Austria.
