= Tychy Municipal Stadium =

Football stadium in Tychy, Poland

Coordinates: 50.1242°N 18.9906°E

Stadion Miejski
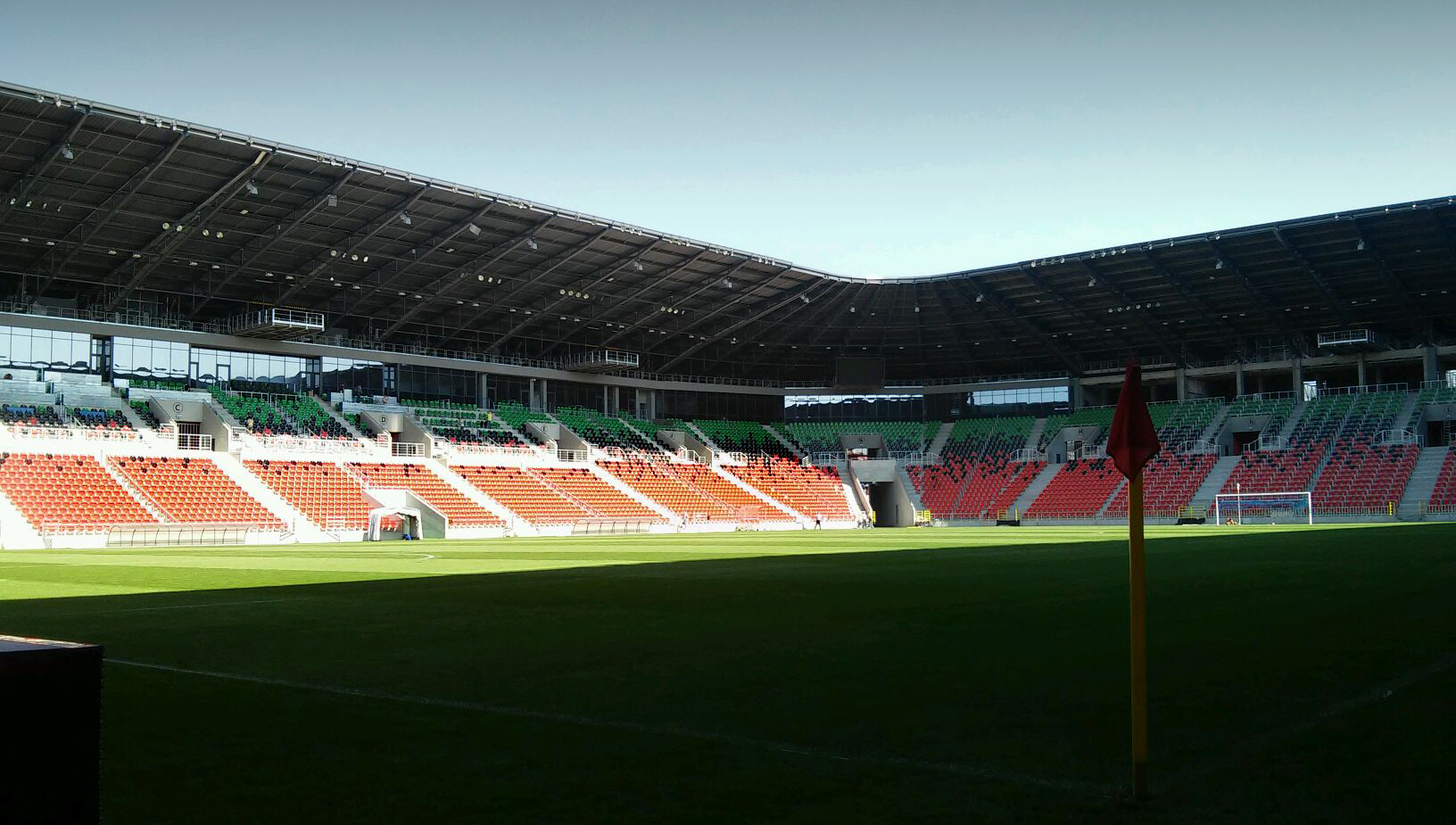
- Interactive map of Stadion Miejski
- Location: ul. Edukacji 7, Tychy, Poland
- Owner: City of Tychy
- Capacity: 15,300
- Surface: Field (grass)
- Field size: 105 m × 68 m (344 ft × 223 ft)

Construction
- Built: 2013–2015
- Cost: 128,9 million PLN

Tenants
- GKS Tychy: Major sporting events hosted; 2017 UEFA Under-21 Euro 2019 FIFA U-20 World Cup

The Stadion Miejski (English: Municipal Stadium) is a football stadium located in Tychy, Poland. It is the home ground of GKS Tychy. The stadium holds 15,300 people. The stadium is owned by the City of Tychy and is operated by Tyski Sport S.A.

== History ==
It was constructed between 2013 and 2015 on the site of the demolished former stadium. The new venue is a football-specific stadium, with the athletics facilities removed. All stands are covered by a titanium-zinc roof, the stadium has a seating capacity of 15,300, and it meets UEFA Category 3 standards and eligible to host qualifying matches for the UEFA Champions League, UEFA Europa League, UEFA Conference League, as well as qualification matches for the FIFA World Cup and the UEFA European Championship. The club building and the main stand are located on Baziowa Street, while the away supporters' section is situated in the north stand. A car park with 312 parking spaces is located adjacent to the stadium.

The stadium was one of the venues for the 2017 UEFA European Under-21 Championship, hosting three group-stage matches and one semi-final, and for the 2019 FIFA U-20 World Cup, where it hosted six group-stage matches, one round-of-16 match, and one quarter-final.

== See also ==
- List of football stadiums in Poland
- Lists of stadiums
