= Bartosz Śpiączka =

Polish footballer

Personal information
- Full name: Bartosz Śpiączka
- Date of birth: 19 August 1991 (age 35)
- Place of birth: Wolsztyn, Poland
- Height: 1.84 m (6 ft 0 in)
- Position: Forward

Senior career*
Years	Team	Apps	(Gls)
2008	Sokół Rakoniewice		
2009	Dyskobolia Grodzisk		
2010–2011	Polonia Nowy Tomyśl	38	(11)
2011	Grom Wolsztyn		
2011–2014	Flota Świnoujście	67	(8)
2014–2015	Podbeskidzie	23	(4)
2015–2017	Górnik Łęczna	67	(19)
2017–2019	Termalica Nieciecza	42	(4)
2018–2019	→ GKS Katowice (loan)	23	(4)
2020–2022	Górnik Łęczna	69	(23)
2022–2023	Korona Kielce	17	(4)
2023	→ Wisła Płock (loan)	13	(2)
2023–2025	GKS Tychy	64	(14)
2025–2026	Górnik Łęczna	12	(2)
- * Club domestic league appearances and goals as of 15:54, 26 May 2026 (UTC)

Bartosz Śpiączka (born 19 August 1991) is a Polish professional footballer who plays as a forward.

== Honours ==
Polonia Nowy Tomyśl

- III liga Kuyavia-Pomerania – Greater Poland: 2009–10

Górnik Łęczna

- II liga: 2019–20

Individual

- I liga Goal of the Season: 2024–25
