= Kazimierz Górski Stadium =

Sports stadium in Plock, Poland

Coordinates: 52.5620°N 19.6841°E

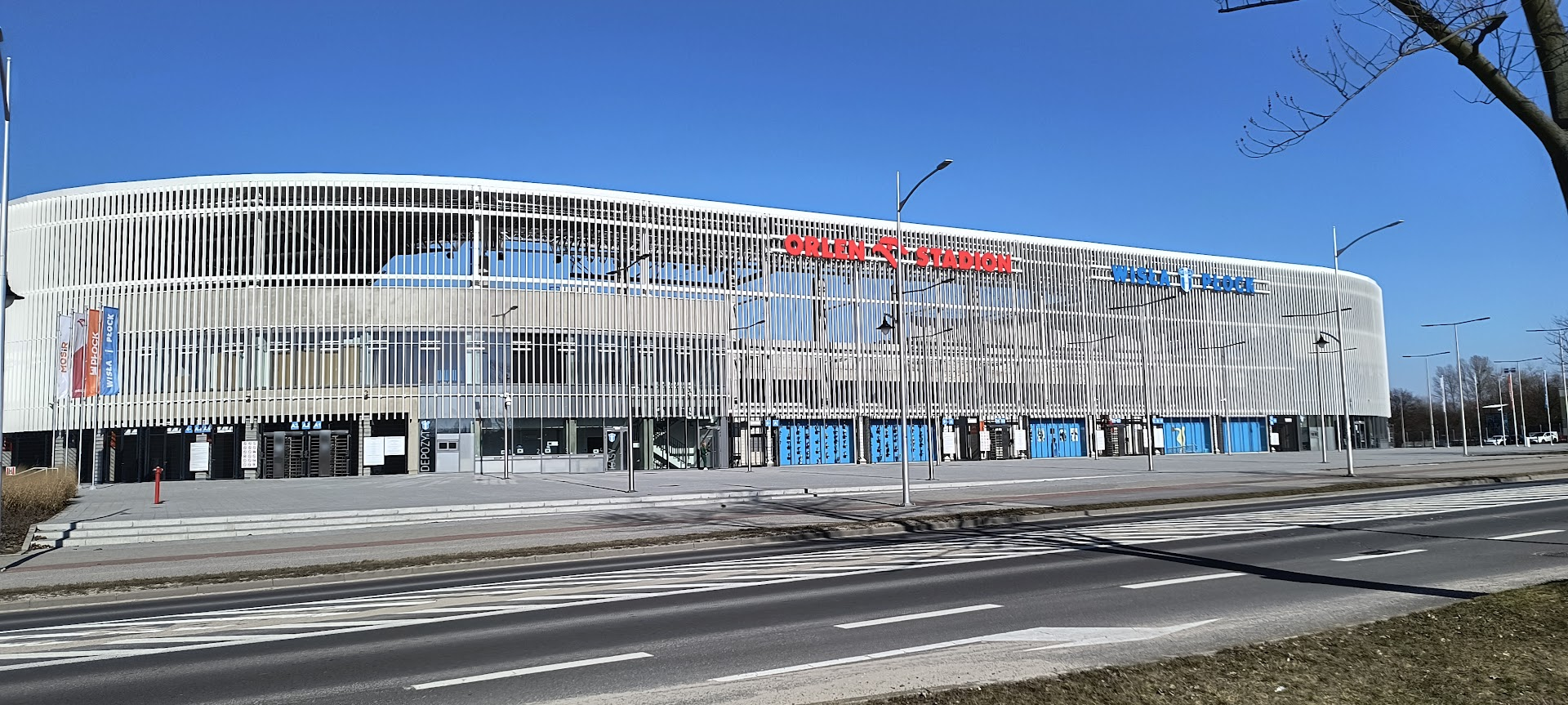
- Orlen Stadion in 2025
- Interactive map of Kazimierz Górski Stadium
- Address: Ul. Łukasiewicza 34
- Location: Płock, Poland
- Capacity: 15,004
- Record attendance: 27,000 (1974); Poland vs FC Twente
- Field size: 105 m × 68 m (344 ft × 223 ft)

Construction
- Opened: 10 June 1973
- Renovated: 2020–2023
- Cost: 166,5 mln PLN (US$44,000,000)

Tenant
- Wisła Płock

The Kazimierz Górski Stadium (Polish: Stadion im. Kazimierza Górskiego), known for sponsorship reasons as the Kazimierz Górski Orlen Stadium (Polish: Orlen Stadion im. Kazimierza Górskiego) since March 2023, is a football stadium in Płock, Poland. It is the home of Wisła Płock. The stadium is also known as the Wisła Płock Stadium in connection with its most common host, or Orlen Stadion as its short commercial name.

== Stadium characteristics ==
=== Old stadium ===
The stadium was built in 1973. It was designed by Jacek Kwieciński i Janusz Mariański. It was estimated that it could held up to 30,000 spectators, but in 1996 capacity was reduced to 10,978.

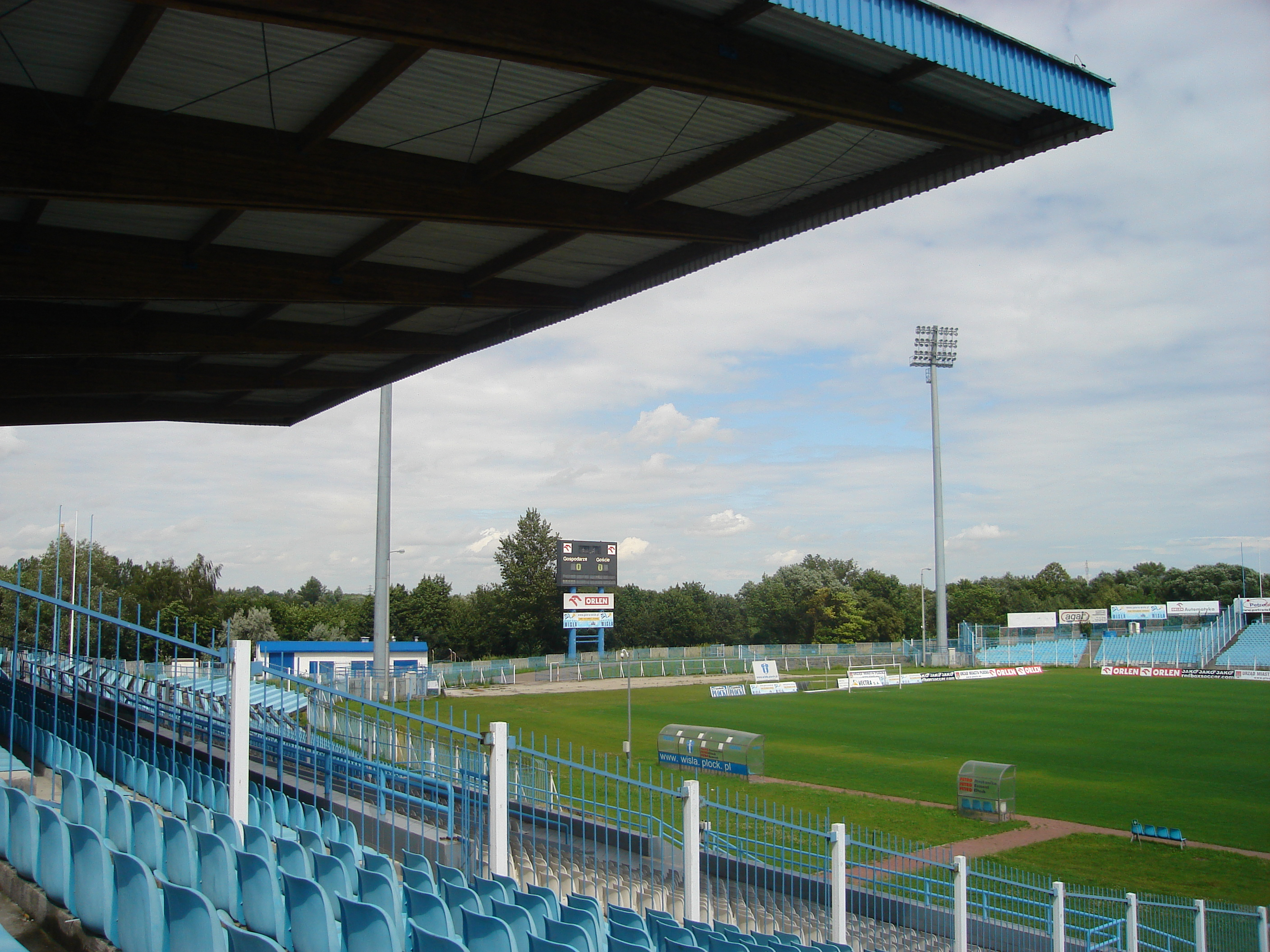
Stadium before renovation (2009)

=== New stadium ===
In 2019 it was announced that the stadium will be majorly reconstructed. The design was drawn by Perbo Group and the construction was held by Mirbus S.A. It started in 2020 and completed in 2023. Current it holds 15,004 spectators and meets UEFA Category 3 criteria. The construction costed PLN 166 million (US$44 million).

=== Name ===
It is named after Kazimierz Górski since 2004. In March 2023 PKN Orlen signed a five-year sponsorship deal. While keeping Kazimierz Górski as its patron, the full commercial name of the stadium is Orlen Stadion im. Kazimierza Górskiego.

== Poland national team matches ==
At the old stadium, the Poland national football team has played two friendly matches. At the new stadium, the Poland national under-21 football team has played a qualifying match for 2025 UEFA European Under-21 Championship.

Nr	Competition	Date	Opponent	Attendance	Result	Scorers for Poland
1.	Friendly	16 November 2003	Serbia and Montenegro	9,000	4–3	Andrzej Niedzielan, Grzegorz Rasiak, Kamil Kosowski, Maciej Żurawski
2.	Friendly	31 March 2004	United States	10,000	0–1	–
3.	2025 UEFA European Under-21 Championship qualification	8 September 2023	Kosovo	6,265	3–0	Ariel Mosór, Michał Rakoczy (2)
