= 2024–25 ŁKS Łódź season =

ŁKS Łódź
2024–25 season
- Manager: Jakub Dziółka
- Stadium: Władysław Król Stadium
- I liga: 15th
- Polish Cup: Pre-season
- Top goalscorer: League: Adrien Louveau (1); All: Adrien Louveau (1)
- Biggest defeat: Arka Gdynia 2–1 ŁKS Łódź
Home colours	Away colours

The 2024–25 season is the 117th season in the history of ŁKS Łódź, and the club's first season back in I liga. In addition to the domestic league, the team is scheduled to participate in the Polish Cup.

== Transfers ==
=== Out ===
Pos.	Player	Transferred to	Fee	Date	Source
DF	(Azerbaijan) Rahil Mammadov	(Poland) Radomiak Radom	Contract termination	3 July 2024	
DF	(Poland) Mieszko Lorenc		Contract termination	4 July 2024	
FW	(Poland) Bartosz Szeliga	(Poland) Warta Poznań	Contract termination	4 July 2024	
DF	(Poland) Marcin Flis		Contract termination	4 July 2024	
MF	(Poland) Maciej Śliwa		Contract termination	4 July 2024	
MF	(Poland) Adrian Małachowski		Contract termination	4 July 2024	

== Friendlies ==
=== Pre-season ===
29 June 2024 Friendly	ŁKS Łódź (Poland)	1–2	(Poland) Wieczysta Kraków	Łódź
12:00	Gülen 75'	Report	Danielak 55'; Chuma 81'	Stadium: Minerska Football Training Center; Referee: Konrad Gawroński

6 July 2024 Friendly	Stal Mielec (Poland)	1–3	(Poland) ŁKS Łódź	Wola Chorzelowska
11:00

9 July 2024 Friendly	Puszcza Niepolomice (Poland)	0–0	(Poland) ŁKS Łódź	Wola Chorzelowska
11:30 UTC+3				Stadium: Hotel Rado

22 July 2024 Friendly	Piast Gliwice (Poland)	2–1	(Poland) ŁKS Łódź	Gliwice
12:25	Karbowy 45'; Kądzior 68'		Zając 77'

=== Mid-season ===
25 January 2025 Friendly	ŁKS Łódź (Poland)	0–0	(Uzbekistan) Andijon

28 January 2025 Friendly	ŁKS Łódź (Poland)	3–0	(Ukraine) Obolon Kyiv
14:00	Norlin 2'; Andreu Arasa 36'; Mateusz Wzięch 75'	Report

31 January 2025 Friendly	ŁKS Łódź (Poland)	1–2	(Poland) Wieczysta Kraków
10:30	Sitek 60'	Report	Goku Román 25' 30'

8 February 2025 Friendly	ŁKS Łódź (Poland)	0–0	(Poland) Tychy
10:00		Report

== Competitions ==
=== Overall record ===
Competition	First match	Last match	Starting round	Record							
Competition	First match	Last match	Starting round	Pld	W	D	L	GF	GA	GD	Win %
I liga	29 July 2024	25–26 May 2025	Matchday 1	4	0	1	3	2	6	−4	0.00
Polish Cup				0	0	0	0	0	0	+0	—
Total				4	0	1	3	2	6	−4	0.00

Last updated: 16 August 2024
Source: Soccerway

=== I liga ===
==== League table ====
Pos	Team	Pld	W	D	L	GF	GA	GD	Pts
9	Górnik Łęczna	34	13	11	10	50	42	+8	50
10	Ruch Chorzów	34	13	9	12	50	46	+4	48
11	ŁKS Łódź	34	13	8	13	50	41	+9	47
12	Stal Rzeszów	34	9	8	17	42	59	−17	35
13	Chrobry Głogów	34	8	9	17	37	59	−22	33

Source: 1liga.org, 90minut.pl
Rules for classification: 1) Points; 2) Head-to-head points; 3) Head-to-head goal difference; 4) Goal difference; 6) Goals scored; 7) Number of wins; 8) Number of away wins.
(Note: Head-to-head record is used only after all the matches between the teams in question have been played)

Semi-finals; 29 May 2025
3	Wisła Płock	2
6	Polonia Warsaw	1
4	Wisła Kraków	0
5	Miedź Legnica	1

Final; 1 June 2025
3	Wisła Płock	2
5	Miedź Legnica	0

==== Results summary ====
Overall								Home						Away					
Pld	W	D	L	GF	GA	GD	Pts	W	D	L	GF	GA	GD	W	D	L	GF	GA	GD
4	0	1	3	2	6	−4	1	0	1	1	1	3	−2	0	0	2	1	3	−2

Last updated: 16 August 2024.

==== Results by round ====
Round	1	2	3	4	5
Ground	H	A	H	A	H
Result	P	L	D	L	L
Position	11	15			

Updated to match(es) played on 16 August 2024. Source:
A = Away; H = Home; W = Win; D = Draw; L = Loss

==== Matches ====
The match schedule was released on 12 June 2024.

29 July 2024 2	Arka Gdynia	2–1	ŁKS Łódź	Gdynia
20:30 UTC+2	Marcjanik 7'; Skóra 88'		Louveau 45+2'	Stadium: Gdynia Stadium; Referee: Marcin Szczerbowicz

5 August 2024 3	ŁKS Łódź	1–1	Górnik Łęczna	Łódź
20:30	Majcenić (yellow card) 11'; Arasa Fort 50'; Louveau (red card) 56'; Mokrzycki (yellow card) 64'; Kupczak (yellow card) 77'		Warchoł 89', (yellow card) 90+7'	Stadium: Władysław Król Stadium; Attendance: 6,421; Referee: Leszek Lewandowski

10 August 2024 4	Miedź Legnica	1–0	ŁKS Łódź	Legnica
19:35	Mioč 68'			Stadium: Stadion Miejski w Legnicy; Attendance: 3,799; Referee: Mateusz Piszczelok

16 August 2024 5	ŁKS Łódź	0–2	Kotwica Kołobrzeg	Łódź
20:30	Majcenić (red card) 88'		Bykowski 14'; Petrović 90+7'	Stadium: Władysław Król Stadium; Attendance: 6,254; Referee: Łukasz Karski

20 August 2024 6	Warta Poznań	2–4	ŁKS Łódź	Grodzisk Wielkopolski
20:30 CEST	Bartkowski 49'; Szeliga 55'; Kacper Jóźwicki (yellow card) 73'	Report	Ivan Mihaljević (yellow card) 21'; Andreu Arasa 32'; Antoni Młynarczyk 34'; Feiertag 51' (yellow card) 84'; Mokrzycki 75'	Stadium: Stadion Respect Energy; Referee: (Poland) Jarosław Przybył

25 August 2024 7	ŁKS Łódź	3–0	Chrobry Głogów	Łódź
14:30 CEST	Gülen (yellow card) 31'; Andreu Arasa 40' (yellow card) 50'; Mokrzycki 45'; Dankowski (yellow card) 80'; Jędrzej Zając 89'	Report	Szymon Bartlewicz (yellow card) 45+6'	Stadium: Stadion Miejski ŁKS Łódź; Attendance: 6,386; Referee: (Poland) Damian Kos

30 August 2024 8	Odra Opole	0–1	ŁKS Łódź	Opole
18:00 CEST	Muratović (yellow card) 16'; Bartosz (yellow card) 33'; Dawid Czapliński (yellow card) 90+4'	Report	Feiertag 7'; Tutyškinas (yellow card) 81'; Mokrzycki (yellow card) 88'	Stadium: Itaka Arena; Referee: (Poland) Sebastian Jarzębak

13 September 2024 9	ŁKS Łódź	2–0	Pogoń Siedlce	Łódź
18:00 CEST	Feiertag 40'; Andreu Arasa 47'	Report	Milašius (yellow card) 23' (yellow-red card) 45+1'; Szuprytowski (yellow card) 41'; Krzyżak (yellow card) 70'; Cássio (yellow card) 73'	Stadium: Stadion Miejski ŁKS Łódź; Attendance: 6,687; Referee: (Poland) Paweł Horożaniecki

17 September 2024 1	ŁKS Łódź	3–1	Wisła Kraków	Łódź
19:30 CEST	Andreu Arasa 10' (yellow card) 45'; Feiertag 28'; Piotr Głowacki (yellow card) 32'; Mokrzycki 71' (pen.)	Report	Sukiennicki (yellow card) 69'; Łasicki (yellow card) 89'; Uryga (yellow card) 90+5' (goal) 90+6'	Stadium: Stadion Miejski ŁKS Łódź; Attendance: 8,328; Referee: (Poland) Wojciech Myć
Note: The matches were scheduled for 21 July, but were postponed due to Wisła Krakow's participation in the Europa League.

21 September 2024 10	Nieciecza	2–2	ŁKS Łódź	Nieciecza
17:30 CEST	Wiech 4' (o.g.); Strzałek 16'; Damian Hilbrycht (yellow card) 57'; Kasperkiewicz (yellow card) 78'; Andrzej Trubeha (yellow card) 90'	Report	Piotr Głowacki (yellow card) 7'; Mokrzycki (yellow card) 33' (goal) 76'; Antoni Młynarczyk 38'; Kupczak (yellow card) 73'; Alastuey (yellow card) 85'; Pirulo (yellow card) 89'	Stadium: Stadion Sportowy Bruk-Bet Termalica; Attendance: 2,495; Referee: (Poland) Sebastian Jarzębak

30 September 2024 11	ŁKS Łódź	0–1	Wisła Płock	Łódź
19:00 CEST	Feiertag (yellow card) 62'; Wiech (yellow card) 71'	Report	Fabian Hiszpański (yellow card) 15'; Dani Pacheco (yellow card) 46'; Miłosz Brzozowski (yellow card) 54'; Krystian Pomorski 60'	Stadium: Stadion Miejski ŁKS Łódź; Attendance: 7,268; Referee: (Poland) Tomasz Kwiatkowski

6 October 2024 12	Tychy	0–3	ŁKS Łódź	Tychy
17:00 CEST	Tobiasz Kubik (yellow card) 83'; Ertlthaler (yellow card) 90'	Report	Feiertag 33'; Pirulo 35'; Wiech (yellow card) 45'; Andreu Arasa 51'; Tutyškinas (yellow card) 86'	Stadium: Tychy Municipal Stadium; Attendance: 4,183; Referee: (Poland) Paweł Raczkowski

20 October 2024 13	ŁKS Łódź	0–0	Stal Stalowa Wola	Łódź
17:00 CEST		Report	Bartosz Pioterczak (yellow card) 23'; Ruszel (yellow card) 90+5'	Stadium: Stadion Miejski ŁKS Łódź; Attendance: 7,318; Referee: (Poland) Mateusz Piszczelok

26 October 2024 14	Stal Rzeszów	2–4	ŁKS Łódź	Rzeszów
17:30 CET	Kościelny (yellow card) 42' (goal) 51'; Benedykt Piotrowski 71'	Report	Feiertag 29' 86'; Dankowski 57'; Antoni Młynarczyk 66'	Stadium: Stal Rzeszów Municipal Stadium; Attendance: 4,256; Referee: (Poland) Sebastian Krasny

3 November 2024 15	ŁKS Łódź	0–1	Ruch Chorzów	Łódź
14:30 CET	Kupczak (yellow card) 85'	Report	Barański 48'; Sadlok (yellow card) 72'	Stadium: Stadion Miejski ŁKS Łódź; Attendance: 10,512; Referee: (Poland) Grzegorz Kawałko

8 November 2024 16	ŁKS Łódź	0–0	Polonia Warsaw	Łódź
20:30 CET	Balić (yellow card) 80'; Aleksander Bobek (yellow card) 90+1'	Report	Dani Vega (yellow card) 18' (yellow-red card) 79'	Stadium: Stadion Miejski ŁKS Łódź; Attendance: 5,121; Referee: (Poland) Jacek Małyszek

23 November 2024 17	Znicz Pruszków	2–2	ŁKS Łódź	Pruszków
19:30 CET	Daniel Stanclik 62'; Dawid Olejarka 90+3'	Report	Mokrzycki 8' (pen.); Aleksander Bobek (yellow card) 53'; Feiertag 67'; Andreu Arasa (yellow card) 90+2'	Stadium: Stadion Znicza Pruszków; Referee: (Poland) Sebastian Jarzębak

30 November 2024 18	Wisła Kraków	2–1	ŁKS Łódź	Kraków
19:30 CET	Zwoliński 61' 90'	Report	Gülen 11'; Wiech (yellow card) 22'; Kupczak (yellow card) 49'; Mokrzycki (yellow card) 67'	Stadium: Henryk Reyman Municipal Stadium; Attendance: 17,383; Referee: (Poland) Jarosław Przybył

9 December 2024 19	ŁKS Łódź	0–2	Arka Gdynia	Łódź
19:00 CET	Piotr Głowacki (yellow card) 34'; Aleksander Iwańczyk (yellow card) 78' (red card) 88'	Report	Marcjanik 82'; Gojny (yellow card) 85'; Vitalucci (yellow card) 86'; Sobczak (yellow card) 90+3' (goal) 90+4'	Stadium: Stadion Miejski ŁKS Łódź; Attendance: 4,832; Referee: (Poland) Paweł Raczkowski

16 February 2025 20	Górnik Łęczna	2–2	ŁKS Łódź	Łęczna
14:30 CET	Warchoł 23'; Banaszak 44'; Deja (yellow card) 58'	Report	Antoni Młynarczyk 8'; Mokrzycki (yellow card) 44'; Kupczak (yellow card) 52'; Rudol (yellow card) 53'; Marko Mrvaljević (yellow card) 69' (goal) 82'; Dankowski (yellow card) 90+1'	Stadium: Łęczna Stadium; Attendance: 1,513; Referee: (Poland) Piotr Rzucidło

23 February 2025 21	ŁKS Łódź	0–1	Miedź Legnica	Łódź
14:30 CET	Kupczak (yellow card) 90+4'	Report	Mateusz Grudziński (yellow card) 44'; Kaczmarski (yellow card) 70'; Kovačević 82' (pen.); Damian Michalik (yellow card) 84'	Stadium: Stadion Miejski ŁKS Łódź; Attendance: 5,972; Referee: (Poland) Bartosz Frankowski

=== Polish Cup ===
26 September 2024 First Round	Grom Nowy Staw	0-2	ŁKS Łódź	Nowy Staw
12:15 CEST		Report	Tutyškinas (yellow card) 45'; Andreu Arasa 83' 90+2'	Stadium: Stadion Miejski; Referee: (Poland) Karol Arys

30 October 2024 Round of 32	Kluczbork	0-1	ŁKS Łódź	Kluczbork
18:00 CET	Mateusz Lechowicz (yellow card) 90+2'	Report	Tutyškinas (yellow card) 4' (yellow-red card) 46'; Feiertag 45'; Piotr Głowacki (yellow card) 77'; Łukasz Bomba (yellow card) 79'	Stadium: Stadion Miejski; Referee: (Poland) Maciej Kuropatwa

5 December 2024 Round of 16	ŁKS Łódź	0-3	Legia Warsaw	Łódź
18:00 CET	Pirulo (yellow card) 47'	Report	Marc Gual 48' 62'; Urbański (yellow card) 51'; Dankowski 57' (o.g.); Augustyniak (yellow card) 75'; Çelhaka (yellow card) 90+5'	Stadium: Stadion Miejski ŁKS Łódź; Attendance: 8,951; Referee: (Poland) Łukasz Kuźma
