= List of Polish football transfers winter 2024–25 =

This is a list of Polish football transfers for the 2024–25 winter transfer window. Only transfers featuring Ekstraklasa are listed.

== Ekstraklasa ==
Note: Flags indicate national team as has been defined under FIFA eligibility rules. Players may hold more than one non-FIFA nationality.

=== Jagiellonia Białystok ===
In:

No.	Pos.	Nation	Player
7	FW	POR	Edi Semedo (on loan from (Cyprus) Aris Limassol)
15	MF	POL	Norbert Wojtuszek (from Górnik Zabrze)
23	DF	CMR	Enzo Ebosse (on loan from (Italy) Udinese)
31	MF	USA	Leon Flach (from (United States) Philadelphia Union)

Out:

No.	Pos.	Nation	Player
4	DF	KOS	Jetmir Haliti (to (Czech Republic) Mladá Boleslav)
8	MF	POR	Nené (to (China) Yunnan Yukun)
22	DF	SVK	Peter Kováčik (loan return to (Italy) Como)
29	MF	POL	Marcin Listkowski (on loan to Zagłębie Lubin)
38	MF	POL	Damian Wojdakowski (to Unia Skierniewice)
39	MF	FRA	Aurélien Nguiamba (free agent)
66	GK	POL	Miłosz Piekutowski (on loan to Stal Stalowa Wola)

=== Śląsk Wrocław ===
In:

No.	Pos.	Nation	Player
8	MF	ESP	José Pozo (from (Cyprus) Karmiotissa)
9	FW	SWE	Assad Al Hamlawi (from (Sweden) Oddevold)
23	MF	BUL	Sylvester Jasper (free agent)
25	FW	NOR	Henrik Udahl (on loan from (Norway) HamKam)
28	DF	ESP	Marc Llinares (from (Sweden) Hammarby)

Out:

No.	Pos.	Nation	Player
4	DF	POL	Łukasz Bejger (to (Slovenia) Celje)
9	FW	SUI	Junior Eyamba (to Austria Lustenau)
14	DF	POL	Mateusz Bartolewski (to Chrobry Głogów)
44	GK	POL	Hubert Śliczniak (on loan to Stal Brzeg)
87	DF	BUL	Simeon Petrov (on loan to (Hungary) Fehérvár)
99	FW	POL	Adam Basse (to Raków Częstochowa)

=== Legia Warsaw ===
In:

No.	Pos.	Nation	Player
17	FW	BLR	Ilya Shkurin (from Stal Mielec)
19	DF	POR	Rúben Vinagre (from (Portugal) Sporting CP, previously on loan)
21	MF	ARM	Vahan Bichakhchyan (from Pogoń Szczecin)
25	DF	JPN	Ryōya Morishita (from (Japan) Nagoya Grampus, previously on loan)
77	GK	BIH	Vladan Kovačević (on loan from (Portugal) Sporting CP)

Out:

No.	Pos.	Nation	Player
4	DF	SUI	Marco Burch (on loan to Radomiak Radom)
17	FW	FRA	Migouel Alfarela (on loan to (Greece) Athens Kallithea)
21	MF	ALB	Jurgen Çelhaka (to (Slovenia) Olimpija Ljubljana)
80	MF	POL	Jakub Adkonis (on loan to Ruch Chorzów)
99	FW	POL	Jordan Majchrzak (on loan to Arka Gdynia)
—	DF	RUS	Ramil Mustafaev (to Cracovia II)

=== Pogoń Szczecin ===
In:

No.	Pos.	Nation	Player
3	DF	CHI	Benjamín Rojas (from (Chile) Palestino)
6	DF	BRA	Luizão (on loan from (England) West Ham United)
55	FW	BRA	Renyer (free agent)

Out:

No.	Pos.	Nation	Player
20	MF	AUT	Alexander Gorgon (to (Austria) SCR Altach)
22	MF	ARM	Vahan Bichakhchyan (to Legia Warsaw)
23	DF	AUT	Benedikt Zech (to (Austria) SCR Altach)
72	MF	IRN	Yadegar Rostami (to (Iran) Fajr Sepasi)

=== Lech Poznań ===
In:

No.	Pos.	Nation	Player
10	FW	SWE	Patrik Wålemark (from (Netherlands) Feyenoord, previously on loan)
23	MF	ISL	Gísli Þórðarson (from (Iceland) Víkingur)
29	DF	DEN	Rasmus Carstensen (on loan from (Germany) 1. FC Köln)
77	FW	ESP	Mario González (on loan from (United States) Los Angeles, previously on loan at (Portugal) Famalicão)
—	MF	POL	Bartłomiej Barański (from Ruch Chorzów)

Out:

No.	Pos.	Nation	Player
5	DF	SWE	Elias Andersson (on loan to (Denmark) Viborg)
17	FW	POL	Filip Szymczak (on loan to GKS Katowice)
20	DF	USA	Ian Hoffmann (on loan to (Norway) Kristiansund)
33	MF	BIH	Stjepan Lončar (to (Croatia) Istra 1961)
50	MF	CIV	Adriel Ba Loua (to (France) Caen)
—	MF	POL	Bartłomiej Barański (on loan to Ruch Chorzów)
—	DF	POL	Bartosz Tomaszewski (on loan to Polonia Bytom, previously on loan at Stal Stalowa Wola)
—	MF	POL	Jakub Antczak (on loan to Chrobry Głogów, previously on loan at GKS Katowice)

=== Górnik Zabrze ===
In:

No.	Pos.	Nation	Player
22	MF	NGA	Abbati Abdullahi (from (Nigeria) Sporting Supreme)
23	MF	NOR	Sondre Liseth (from (Norway) Haugesund)
30	FW	SEN	Ousmane Sow (from (Belgium) Lierse)
38	MF	CZE	Filip Prebsl (on loan from (Czech Republic) Sparta Prague)
80	MF	MNE	Matija Marsenić (from (Germany) Bayer Leverkusen)
81	DF	SVK	Matúš Kmeť (on loan from (United States) Minnesota United)

Out:

No.	Pos.	Nation	Player
6	MF	POL	Damian Rasak (to (Hungary) Újpest)
15	MF	POL	Norbert Wojtuszek (to Jagiellonia Białystok)
19	DF	POL	Norbert Barczak (on loan to Polonia Bytom)
22	DF	ESP	Manu Sánchez (to (Spain) Levante)
28	GK	POL	Kamil Soberka (on loan to Unia Skierniewice)
30	MF	POL	Nikodem Zielonka (on loan to Pogoń Siedlce)

=== Raków Częstochowa ===
In:

No.	Pos.	Nation	Player
17	FW	POR	Leonardo Rocha (from Radomiak Radom)
97	MF	SEN	Ibrahima Seck (from (Senegal) Gorée)
99	FW	POL	Adam Basse (from Śląsk Wrocław)

Out:

No.	Pos.	Nation	Player
6	MF	POL	Szymon Czyż (to Widzew Łódź)
21	MF	POL	Dawid Drachal (on loan to GKS Katowice)
27	MF	POL	Kacper Nowakowski (on loan to Miedź Legnica)
29	FW	FIN	David Ezeh (loan return to (Finland) HJK)
33	DF	POL	Kamil Pestka (to Radomiak Radom)
47	MF	POL	Antoni Burkiewicz (on loan to Podhale Nowy Targ)
91	FW	POL	Tomasz Walczak (on loan to Miedź Legnica)
97	MF	GRE	Lazaros Lamprou (on loan to (Greece) Volos)
—	GK	POL	Jakub Rajczykowski (on loan to Świt Szczecin, previously on loan at Wieczysta Kraków)

=== Zagłębie Lubin ===
In:

No.	Pos.	Nation	Player
3	DF	SWE	Alexander Abrahamsson (from (Sweden) Brommapojkarna)
4	DF	POL	Damian Michalski (from (Germany) Greuther Fürth)
14	MF	SWE	Ludvig Fritzson (from (Sweden) Brommapojkarna)
16	DF	BIH	Josip Ćorluka (from (Bosnia and Herzegovina) Zrinjski Mostar)
29	MF	POL	Marcin Listkowski (on loan from Jagiellonia Białystok)

Out:

No.	Pos.	Nation	Player
2	DF	POL	Bartosz Kopacz (to Bruk-Bet Termalica)
9	FW	CZE	Václav Sejk (loan return to (Czech Republic) Sparta Prague)
55	DF	POR	Luís Mata (on loan to (Kazakhstan) Kairat)
—	GK	POL	Kacper Bieszczad (to (Portugal) Vizela)

=== Widzew Łódź ===
In:

No.	Pos.	Nation	Player
16	DF	DEN	Peter Therkildsen (on loan from (Sweden) Djurgården)
24	DF	GRE	Polydefkis Volanakis (from (Slovakia) Zemplín Michalovce)
29	FW	SVK	Ľubomír Tupta (on loan from (Czech Republic) Slovan Liberec)
55	MF	POL	Szymon Czyż (from Raków Częstochowa)

Out:

No.	Pos.	Nation	Player
5	DF	KOS	Kreshnik Hajrizi (on loan to (Switzerland) Sion)
9	FW	BIH	Imad Rondić (to (Germany) 1. FC Köln)
47	MF	POL	Antoni Klimek (to Puszcza Niepołomice)

=== Piast Gliwice ===
In:

No.	Pos.	Nation	Player
2	DF	ALG	Akim Zedadka (from (France) Lille)
11	FW	BRB	Thierry Gale (on loan from (Austria) Rapid Wien)
90	MF	SVK	Erik Jirka (from (Czech Republic) Viktoria Plzeň)

Out:

No.	Pos.	Nation	Player
23	MF	POL	Szczepan Mucha (on loan to Rekord Bielsko-Biała)
25	DF	POL	Piotr Liszewski (on loan to Resovia)
37	DF	AUT	Constantin Reiner (to (China) Shaanxi Union)
92	MF	POL	Damian Kądzior (on loan to Stal Mielec)
—	FW	POL	Marcel Bykowski (on loan to Pogoń Siedlce, previously on loan at Kotwica Kołobrzeg)

=== Stal Mielec ===
In:

No.	Pos.	Nation	Player
7	FW	FRA	Jean-David Beauguel (from (China) Qingdao West Coast)
14	FW	POR	Ivan Cavaleiro (free agent)
26	MF	FIN	Pyry Hannola (on loan from (Finland) SJK)
73	MF	POL	Natan Niedźwiedź (from Korona Kielce II)
92	MF	POL	Damian Kądzior (on loan from Piast Gliwice)

Out:

No.	Pos.	Nation	Player
8	MF	JPN	Koki Hinokio (to ŁKS Łódź)
17	FW	BLR	Ilya Shkurin (to Legia Warsaw)
34	MF	POL	Alex Cetnar (to Legia Warsaw II)
40	DF	GRE	Petros Bagalianis (to (Greece) AEL)
—	MF	POL	Przemysław Maj (to KS Wiązownica, previously on loan)

=== Puszcza Niepołomice ===
In:

No.	Pos.	Nation	Player
6	MF	MKD	Jani Atanasov (on loan from Cracovia)
7	MF	POL	Antoni Klimek (from Widzew Łódź)
63	FW	BLR	German Barkovsky (from (Belarus) Dynamo Brest)
88	MF	KAZ	Georgy Zhukov (from (China) Cangzhou Mighty Lions)

Out:

No.	Pos.	Nation	Player
6	MF	KOR	Lee Jin-hyun (to (South Korea) Ulsan HD)
16	MF	POL	Michał Walski (on loan to Stal Stalowa Wola)
20	DF	POL	Filip Gil (to BKS Bochnia)
23	DF	POL	Patryk Kieliś (to Hutnik Kraków)
29	FW	POL	Krystian Okoniewski (on loan to (Lithuania) Dainava)
47	MF	POL	Adam Sendor (to Watra Białka Tatrzańska)
70	MF	POL	Wojciech Hajda (to Miedź Legnica)
77	MF	POL	Dawid Kogut (on loan to KSZO Ostrowiec Świętokrzyski)
—	MF	POL	Mateusz Wójcik (to Avia Świdnik, previously on loan at KS Wiązownica)

=== Cracovia ===
In:

No.	Pos.	Nation	Player
4	DF	SWE	Gustav Henriksson (from (Sweden) Elfsborg)
10	FW	BUL	Martin Minchev (from (Turkey) Çaykur Rizespor)
39	DF	CRO	Mauro Perković (on loan from (Croatia) Dinamo Zagreb)

Out:

No.	Pos.	Nation	Player
8	MF	MKD	Jani Atanasov (on loan to Puszcza Niepołomice)
10	MF	POL	Michał Rakoczy (on loan to (Turkey) Ankaragücü)
17	MF	POL	Mateusz Bochnak (to Miedź Legnica)

=== Korona Kielce ===
In:

No.	Pos.	Nation	Player
44	DF	CYP	Constantinos Soteriou (from (Israel) Bnei Sakhnin)

Out:

No.	Pos.	Nation	Player
21	MF	MEX	Danny Trejo (to (United States) Birmingham Legion)
98	MF	POL	Mateusz Czyżycki (to Odra Opole)

=== Radomiak Radom ===
In:

No.	Pos.	Nation	Player
5	DF	MAR	Saad Agouzoul (on loan from (France) Auxerre)
7	FW	BRA	Pedro Perotti (from (Brazil) Chapecoense)
8	MF	LTU	Paulius Golubickas (from (Lithuania) Žalgiris)
15	FW	BFA	Abdoul Tapsoba (from (Turkey) Adanaspor)
17	FW	AZE	Renat Dadashov (from (Turkey) Ankaragücü)
19	MF	POR	Rafael Barbosa (from (Portugal) Farense)
25	DF	SUI	Marco Burch (on loan from Legia Warsaw)
33	DF	POL	Kamil Pestka (from Raków Częstochowa)
39	FW	BRA	Jonathan (from Kotwica Kołobrzeg)
74	DF	CMR	Steve Kingue (from (Lithuania) Hegelmann)

Out:

No.	Pos.	Nation	Player
3	DF	CHN	Wu Shaocong (loan return to (Turkey) İstanbul Başakşehir)
5	DF	POL	Dariusz Pawłowski (on loan to (Slovakia) Tatran Prešov)
7	MF	BRA	João Peglow (to (United States) D.C. United)
8	MF	BRA	Luizão (to (Brazil) Atlético Goianiense)
14	DF	POL	Damian Jakubik (on loan to Pogoń Siedlce)
15	MF	POL	Dominik Banach (on loan to Resovia)
17	FW	POR	Leonardo Rocha (to Raków Częstochowa)
19	FW	COL	Jean Franco Sarmiento (to Polonia Bytom)
29	DF	BRA	Raphael Rossi (to (Portugal) Mafra)
39	FW	BRA	Jonathan (to Stal Stalowa Wola)
70	FW	CPV	Vagner (free agent)

=== Lechia Gdańsk ===
In:

No.	Pos.	Nation	Player

Out:

No.	Pos.	Nation	Player
19	MF	UKR	Serhiy Buletsa (loan return to (Ukraine) Dynamo Kyiv)
20	DF	BRA	Conrado (to (Brazil) Atlético Goianiense)

=== GKS Katowice ===
In:

No.	Pos.	Nation	Player
18	MF	POL	Dawid Drachal (on loan from Raków Częstochowa)
19	FW	POL	Filip Szymczak (on loan from Lech Poznań)
24	DF	POL	Konrad Gruszkowski (from (Slovakia) Dunajská Streda)

Out:

No.	Pos.	Nation	Player
18	FW	POL	Jakub Arak (to Polonia Bytom)
74	MF	POL	Jakub Antczak (loan return to Lech Poznań)
—	GK	POL	Patryk Kukulski (to Jelenia Góra, previously on loan at Olimpia Grudziądz)

=== Motor Lublin ===
In:

No.	Pos.	Nation	Player
3	DF	BEL	Hervé Matthys (from (Belgium) Beerschot)
7	MF	ROU	Antonio Sefer (on loan from (Israel) Hapoel Be'er Sheva)
16	MF	POL	Franciszek Lewandowski (from Champion Warsaw)
21	MF	POL	Jakub Łabojko (free agent)
33	GK	SVN	Gašper Tratnik (from (Slovenia) Primorje)
42	DF	POL	Bright Ede (from Zagłębie Lubin II)
—	FW	FRA	Jean-Kévin Augustin (free agent)

Out:

No.	Pos.	Nation	Player
3	DF	POL	Patryk Romanowski (on loan to Znicz Pruszków)
8	MF	POL	Krzysztof Kubica (loan return to (Italy) Benevento)
10	MF	POL	Rafał Król (to Stal Kraśnik)
15	DF	POL	Miłosz Lewandowski (on loan to Wisła Puławy)
21	DF	POL	Sebastian Rudol (to ŁKS Łódź)
99	FW	POL	Kacper Śpiewak (to Polonia Warsaw)
—	DF	POL	Konrad Magnuszewski (to Wigry Suwałki, previously on loan at Skra Częstochowa)

== See also ==
- 2024–25 Ekstraklasa
