= List of Polish football transfers winter 2022–23 =

This is a list of Polish football transfers for the 2022–23 winter transfer window. Only transfers featuring Ekstraklasa are listed.

== Ekstraklasa ==
Note: Flags indicate national team as has been defined under FIFA eligibility rules. Players may hold more than one non-FIFA nationality.

=== Lech Poznań ===
In:

No.	Pos.	Nation	Player
77	GK	SVK	Dominik Holec (on loan from (Czech Republic) Sparta Prague)

Out:

No.	Pos.	Nation	Player
20	DF	POL	Maksymilian Pingot (on loan to Odra Opole)
31	GK	POL	Krzysztof Bąkowski (on loan to Stal Rzeszów)
43	MF	POL	Antoni Kozubal (on loan to GKS Katowice)

=== Raków Częstochowa ===
In:

No.	Pos.	Nation	Player
18	DF	POL	Adrian Gryszkiewicz (from (Germany) SC Paderborn 07)
20	MF	BRA	Jean Carlos (from Pogoń Szczecin)

Out:

No.	Pos.	Nation	Player
6	DF	POL	Andrzej Niewulis (to Miedź Legnica)
14	MF	POL	Daniel Szelągowski (on loan to Chojniczanka Chojnice)
22	MF	ROU	Deian Sorescu (on loan to (Romania) FCSB)
29	GK	POL	Xavier Dziekoński (on loan to Garbarnia Kraków)
88	MF	GEO	Valerian Gvilia (free agent)
—	FW	POL	Michał Litwa (to Motor Lublin)

=== Pogoń Szczecin ===
In:

No.	Pos.	Nation	Player
28	DF	SWE	Linus Wahlqvist (from (Sweden) Norrköping)
32	DF	GRE	Leonardo Koutris (from (Greece) Olympiacos)
68	DF	CRO	Danijel Lončar (from (Croatia) Osijek)

Out:

No.	Pos.	Nation	Player
2	DF	POL	Jakub Bartkowski (to Lechia Gdańsk)
14	MF	POL	Kamil Drygas (to Miedź Legnica)
17	MF	POL	Mariusz Fornalczyk (on loan to Termalica Nieciecza)
19	FW	POL	Kacper Kostorz (on loan to Korona Kielce)
21	MF	BRA	Jean Carlos (to Raków Częstochowa)
97	DF	POR	Luís Mata (to Zagłębie Lubin)
—	DF	POL	Bartłomiej Mruk (on loan to Garbarnia Kraków)

=== Lechia Gdańsk ===
In:

No.	Pos.	Nation	Player
5	DF	POL	Jakub Bartkowski (from Pogoń Szczecin)
17	DF	GER	Louis Poznański (from (Greece) PAS Giannina)
30	FW	AUT	Kevin Friesenbichler (from (Latvia) RFS)

Out:

No.	Pos.	Nation	Player
17	MF	GER	Christian Clemens (to (Germany) 1. FC Düren)
45	FW	POL	Krystian Okoniewski (to Radomiak Radom)
77	MF	POL	Tomasz Neugebauer (on loan to Podbeskidzie)
83	GK	POL	Antoni Mikułko (on loan to Wieczysta Kraków)
—	MF	POL	Jan Biegański (reloan to GKS Tychy)

=== Piast Gliwice ===
In:

No.	Pos.	Nation	Player
23	MF	POL	Szczepan Mucha (from Rekord Bielsko-Biała)
34	FW	AUT	Alex Sobczyk (from (Cyprus) Doxa Katokopias)

Out:

No.	Pos.	Nation	Player
1	GK	POL	Jakub Szmatuła (retired)
9	FW	ESP	Alberto Toril (on loan to (Spain) Real Murcia)
11	FW	EST	Rauno Sappinen (on loan to Stal Mielec)
—	MF	POL	Mateusz Winciersz (on loan to Skra Częstochowa, previously on loan at Ruch Chorzów)
—	MF	POL	Wojciech Kamiński (to Odra Opole)

=== Wisła Płock ===
In:

No.	Pos.	Nation	Player
11	MF	CZE	Martin Hašek (from (Turkey) Erzurumspor)
18	FW	POL	Bartosz Śpiączka (on loan from Korona Kielce)
37	MF	POL	Paweł Chrupałła (on loan from (Norway) Rosenborg, previously on loan at (Norway) Kristiansund)
71	DF	POL	Jakub Szymański (from Górnik Zabrze)
—	MF	POL	Dawid Zięba (from Lech Poznań II)
—	GK	POL	Jakub Burek (from KSZO Ostrowiec)

Out:

No.	Pos.	Nation	Player
5	DF	AZE	Anton Kryvotsyuk (to (South Korea) Daejeon Hana Citizen)
6	MF	POL	Damian Rasak (to Górnik Zabrze)
11	FW	ESP	Davo (to (Belgium) Eupen)
18	MF	POL	Michał Mokrzycki (on loan to ŁKS Łódź)
—	GK	POL	Jakub Burek (on loan to KSZO Ostrowiec)
—	FW	POL	Kacper Rogoziński (on loan to Busko-Zdrój, previously on loan at ŁKS Łagów)

=== Radomiak Radom ===
In:

No.	Pos.	Nation	Player
17	FW	POR	Leonardo Rocha (from (Belgium) Lierse)
18	FW	POL	Krystian Okoniewski (from Lechia Gdańsk)
19	FW	COL	Jean Franco Sarmiento (from Pogoń Grodzisk)
70	FW	COL	Frank Castañeda (from (Thailand) Buriram United)
77	MF	GRE	Christos Donis (free agent)
80	MF	ESP	Alberto Cayarga (free agent)
88	MF	POR	Chico Ramos (from (Portugal) Nacional)
92	DF	COD	Mike Cestor (from (Romania) Argeș Pitești)

Out:

No.	Pos.	Nation	Player
5	DF	POL	Dariusz Pawłowski (on loan to Sandecja)
13	FW	BRA	Maurides (to (Germany) FC St. Pauli)
22	MF	POR	Tiago Matos (on loan to (Slovakia) Tatran Prešov)
24	MF	CAN	Nikolas Korzeniecki (to Warta Poznań)
30	DF	POL	Mateusz Grzybek (to Zagłębie Lubin)
36	DF	POL	Aleksander Gajgier (on loan to Pogoń Grodzisk)
75	GK	POL	Jakub Ojrzyński (loan return to (England) Liverpool)
87	FW	POL	Franciszek Wróblewski (to (Slovakia) Humenné)
97	FW	POL	Dominik Sokół (on loan to (Slovakia) Tatran Prešov)
99	FW	POL	Michał Feliks (on loan to Ruch Chorzów)
—	DF	POL	Kacper Wiatrak (on loan to Pilica Białobrzegi, previously on loan at Chełmianka)
—	MF	POL	Kacper Pankowski (on loan to Oskar Przysucha, previously on loan at Legionovia)

=== Górnik Zabrze ===
In:

No.	Pos.	Nation	Player
2	DF	SVK	Boris Sekulić (from (United States) Chicago Fire)
6	MF	POL	Damian Rasak (from Wisła Płock)
9	FW	CUW	Anthony van den Hurk (on loan from (Turkey) Çaykur Rizespor)
32	GK	BLR	Pavel Pavlyuchenko (on loan from Termalica Nieciecza)
41	MF	JPN	Daisuke Yokota (from (Latvia) Valmiera)

Out:

No.	Pos.	Nation	Player
17	MF	SUI	Robin Kamber (free agent)
28	FW	POL	Jan Ciućka (on loan to Górnik Polkowice)
32	GK	GER	Kevin Broll (to (Germany) Dynamo Dresden)
77	DF	POL	Jakub Szymański (to Wisła Płock)
—	GK	POL	Bartosz Neugebauer (on loan to Kotwica Kołobrzeg, previously on loan at Chojniczanka Chojnice)
—	MF	POL	Mateusz Ziółkowski (on loan to Siarka Tarnobrzeg, previously on loan at Zagłębie Sosnowiec)

=== Cracovia ===
In:

No.	Pos.	Nation	Player
6	MF	MKD	Jani Atanasov (from (Croatia) Hajduk Split)
17	MF	POL	Mateusz Bochnak (from Chrobry Głogów)
22	DF	FIN	Arttu Hoskonen (from (Finland) HJK)

Out:

No.	Pos.	Nation	Player
9	FW	GER	Marcos Álvarez (to (Germany) SV Meppen)
13	MF	POL	Radosław Kanach (to Resovia)
21	MF	BRA	Thiago (on loan to Puszcza Niepołomice)
22	MF	KOS	Florian Loshaj (to (Turkey) İstanbulspor)
30	GK	POL	Adam Wilk (on loan to Hutnik Kraków)
45	FW	SVK	Filip Balaj (on loan to (Czech Republic) Trinity Zlín)
88	DF	CRO	Matej Rodin (to (Belgium) Oostende)

=== Legia Warsaw ===
In:

No.	Pos.	Nation	Player
7	FW	CZE	Tomáš Pekhart (free agent)

Out:

No.	Pos.	Nation	Player
22	MF	POL	Kacper Skibicki (on loan to GKS Tychy)
—	MF	POL	Nikodem Niski (on loan to Resovia)
—	DF	POL	Karol Noiszewski (to Siarka Tarnobrzeg)
—	FW	POL	Wiktor Kamiński (to Warta Poznań)

=== Warta Poznań ===
In:

No.	Pos.	Nation	Player
11	FW	UKR	Volodymyr Kostevych (free agent)
26	MF	CAN	Nikolas Korzeniecki (from Radomiak Radom)
77	MF	AUT	Stefan Savić (from (Turkey) Tuzlaspor)
97	FW	POL	Wiktor Kamiński (from Legia Warsaw)

Out:

No.	Pos.	Nation	Player
10	MF	BEL	Milan Corryn (to (Netherlands) Almere City)
11	MF	POL	Michał Jakóbowski (to Chojniczanka Chojnice)
12	GK	POL	Mateusz Kustosz (on loan to Unia Swarzędz)
23	DF	POL	Mikołaj Rakowski (on loan to Kotwica Kołobrzeg)
—	DF	POL	Albert Żerkowski (on loan to Polonia Środa, previously on loan at Sokół Kleczew)

=== Jagiellonia Białystok ===
In:

No.	Pos.	Nation	Player
3	DF	SVN	Dušan Stojinović (from (Slovenia) Celje)
10	FW	COL	Camilo Mena (on loan from (Latvia) Valmiera)
16	MF	CZE	Michal Sáček (from (Czech Republic) Sparta Prague)
39	MF	FRA	Aurélien Nguiamba (on loan from (Italy) Spezia)

Out:

No.	Pos.	Nation	Player
10	MF	LTU	Fedor Černych (to (Cyprus) AEL Limassol)
17	DF	CRO	Ivan Runje (free agent)
25	DF	ROU	Bogdan Țîru (to (Romania) CFR Cluj)
26	MF	CZE	Martin Pospíšil (to (Czech Republic) Sigma Olomouc)
30	FW	POL	Maciej Twarowski (on loan to Wieczysta Kraków)
38	MF	POL	Bartosz Bayer (on loan to Olimpia Zambrów)
60	FW	POL	Mateusz Kowalski (to (Italy) Parma Youth Sector)
74	FW	POL	Andrzej Trubeha (to Termalica Nieciecza)
—	DF	NGA	Godfrey Stephen (to (Russia) Volga Ulyanovsk, previously on loan at (Georgia (country)) Dinamo Tbilisi)
—	MF	POL	Mateusz Wyjadłowski (to Wisła Sandomierz, previously on loan at Motor Lublin)

=== Zagłębie Lubin ===
In:

No.	Pos.	Nation	Player
13	DF	POL	Mateusz Grzybek (from Radomiak Radom)
55	DF	POR	Luís Mata (from Pogoń Szczecin)
70	FW	POL	Jakub Świerczok (from (Japan) Nagoya Grampus)
87	GK	GRE	Sokratis Dioudis (from (Greece) Panathinaikos)

Out:

No.	Pos.	Nation	Player
8	DF	GEO	Guram Giorbelidze (on loan to (Georgia (country)) Dinamo Batumi)
17	FW	POL	Szymon Kobusiński (on loan to Ruch Chorzów)
33	MF	JPN	Koki Hinokio (to Stal Mielec)

=== Stal Mielec ===
In:

No.	Pos.	Nation	Player
5	MF	ESP	Álex Vallejo (from (Cyprus) Doxa Katokopias)
8	MF	JPN	Koki Hinokio (from Zagłębie Lubin)
9	FW	EST	Rauno Sappinen (on loan from Piast Gliwice)

Out:

No.	Pos.	Nation	Player
15	MF	USA	David Poreba (on loan to (United States) Crown Legacy)
20	MF	POL	Krystian Kardyś (to Czarni Połaniec)
25	MF	POL	Przemysław Maj (on loan to Ruch Chorzów)
39	DF	POL	Michael Wyparło (to (United States) New Mexico United)
59	MF	EST	Bogdan Vaštšuk (to (Republic of Ireland) Sligo Rovers)
99	FW	BIH	Said Hamulic (to (France) Toulouse)
—	DF	POL	Adrian Skrzyniak (on loan to Kotwica Kołobrzeg, previously on loan at Lechia Tomaszów)
—	MF	POL	Łukasz Seweryn (on loan to Resovia, previously on loan at LKS Łagów)

=== Śląsk Wrocław ===
In:

No.	Pos.	Nation	Player
21	FW	POL	Patryk Szwedzik (from GKS Katowice)

Out:

No.	Pos.	Nation	Player
16	MF	POL	Javier Hyjek (on loan to (Spain) Recreativo Huelva)
26	DF	POL	Kacper Radkowski (on loan to (Republic of Ireland) Bohemians)
32	FW	POL	Sebastian Bergier (to GKS Katowice)
—	MF	POL	Mateusz Praszelik (to (Italy) Hellas Verona, previously on loan)

=== Miedź Legnica ===
In:

No.	Pos.	Nation	Player
14	MF	POL	Kamil Drygas (from Pogoń Szczecin)
19	MF	BUL	Dimitar Velkovski (from (Belgium) Cercle Brugge)
21	DF	GRE	Giannis Masouras (from (Greece) Olympiacos)
27	DF	POL	Andrzej Niewulis (from Raków Częstochowa)
40	GK	GRE	Stefanos Kapino (from (Germany) Arminia Bielefeld)

Out:

No.	Pos.	Nation	Player
2	DF	DOM	Carlos Julio Martínez (to (Spain) Atlético Baleares)
13	DF	ESP	Jon Aurtenetxe (free agent)
18	FW	POL	Kamil Zapolnik (to Puszcza Niepołomice)
19	MF	ARG	Jerónimo Cacciabue (loan return to (Argentina) Newell's Old Boys)
59	MF	BEL	Mehdi Lehaire (on loan to Resovia)
70	MF	POL	Maciej Śliwa (to ŁKS Łódź)
80	MF	BEL	Hamza Bahaid (free agent)
—	MF	POL	Tomasz Mamis (to Pogoń Siedlce)
—	MF	POL	Kacper Klimkiewicz (to Chemik Bydgoszcz)
—	MF	POL	Korneliusz Karolczak (to Stal Brzeg)
—	FW	POL	Kacper Chmielewski (on loan to Jelenia Góra)

=== Widzew Łódź ===
In:

No.	Pos.	Nation	Player
14	MF	LVA	Andrejs Cigaņiks (from (Slovakia) Dunajská Streda)

Out:

No.	Pos.	Nation	Player
8	MF	POL	Karol Danielak (to Wieczysta Kraków)

=== Korona Kielce ===
In:

No.	Pos.	Nation	Player
2	DF	CAN	Dominick Zator (from (Canada) York United)
5	DF	ROU	Marius Briceag (from (Romania) Universitatea Cluj)
9	FW	POL	Kacper Kostorz (on loan from Pogoń Szczecin)
11	MF	ESP	Nono (free agent)
28	DF	CAN	Marcus Godinho (from (Canada) Vancouver Whitecaps)
94	DF	POL	Bartosz Kwiecień (from Resovia)

Out:

No.	Pos.	Nation	Player
3	DF	ESP	Roberto Corral (free agent)
9	FW	POL	Adam Frączczak (to Kotwica Kołobrzeg)
11	MF	POL	Łukasz Sierpina (to Kotwica Kołobrzeg)
16	MF	POL	Janusz Nojszewski (on loan to Kotwica Kołobrzeg)
18	FW	POL	Bartosz Śpiączka (on loan to Wisła Płock)
25	DF	POL	Grzegorz Szymusik (to Chojniczanka Chojnice)
26	MF	POL	Oskar Sewerzyński (on loan to Chrobry Głogów)
27	FW	POL	Szymon Majewski (on loan to Stal Kraśnik)
33	DF	MNE	Saša Balić (to (Georgia (country)) Dinamo Batumi)
45	MF	GEO	Luka Zarandia (to (Georgia (country)) Dinamo Batumi)
95	DF	CRO	Mario Zebić (to (Romania) Argeș Pitești)
—	MF	BIH	Zvonimir Petrović (to (Slovenia) Gorica, previously on loan)

== See also ==
- 2022–23 Ekstraklasa
