= 2026–27 Wieczysta Kraków season =

Wieczysta Kraków
2026–27 season
- Manager: Kazimierz Moskal
- Stadium: Henryk Reyman Municipal Stadium
- Ekstraklasa: Pre-season
- Polish Cup: Pre-season

The 2026–27 season is the 85th season in the history of Wieczysta Kraków and their first-ever season in the Ekstraklasa. The club will also compete in the Polish Cup.

== Transfers ==
=== In ===
| Pos. | Player | Transferred from | Fee | Date | Source |
|---|---|---|---|---|---|
| MF | (Norway) Tobias Christensen | (Romania) Rapid București | Undisclosed | 1 July 2026 | |
| DF | (Croatia) Duje Dujmovic | (Bosnia and Herzegovina) Zrinjski Mostar | Undisclosed | 1 July 2026 | |
| MF | (Poland) Ben Lederman | (Israel) Maccabi Tel Aviv | Free | 1 July 2026 | |
| FW | (Switzerland) Christopher Lungoyi | (Turkey) Gaziantep | Undisclosed | 1 July 2026 | |
| DF | (Slovakia) Matúš Vojtko | (Poland) Lechia Gdańsk | Free | 1 July 2026 | |
| DF | (Croatia) Antonio Milić | (Poland) Lech Poznań | Free | 14 July 2026 | |
| GK | (United States) Patryk Stechnij | (United States) Wisloka Chicago | Free | 17 July 2026 | |
| DF | (Poland) Mateusz Wieteska | (Italy) Cagliari | Undisclosed | 31 July 2026 | |

=== Out ===
| Pos. | Player | Transferred to | Fee | Date | Source |
|---|---|---|---|---|---|
| FW | (Spain) Carlitos | (Spain) Intercity | Free | 3 July 2026 | |

== Pre-season and friendlies ==
| 28 June 2026 Friendly | Wieczysta Kraków (Poland) | 2–4 | (Ukraine) Dynamo Kyiv | Austria |
| 17:00 UTC+2 | Feiertag 52'; Christensen 78' | | 30'; 96' (pen.); 106'; 110' |

| 2 July 2026 Friendly | Wieczysta Kraków (Poland) | 1–2 | (Czech Republic) Artis Brno | Austria |
| 17:00 | Paulinho 33' | | 3'; 15' |

| 5 July 2026 Friendly | Wieczysta Kraków (Poland) | 2–2 | (Czech Republic) Slavia Prague |
| 17:00 | 21'; 74' | | 43'; 45+12' |

| 10 July 2026 Friendly | Wieczysta Kraków (Poland) | 2–0 | (Poland) Ruch Chorzów |
| 11:00 | Feiertag 61'; Pestka 78' |

| 18 July 2026 Friendly | Wieczysta Kraków (Poland) | 0–1 | (Israel) Maccabi Netanya |
| 11:30 | Semedo (penalty missed) 61' | | 80' |

== Competitions ==
=== Overall record ===
| Competition | First match | Last match | Starting round | Record | | | | | | | |
| Competition | First match | Last match | Starting round | Pld | W | D | L | GF | GA | GD | Win % |
|---|---|---|---|---|---|---|---|---|---|---|---|
| Ekstraklasa | 24–27 July 2026 | | Matchday 1 | 0 | 0 | 0 | 0 | 0 | 0 | +0 | — |
| Polish Cup | | | | 0 | 0 | 0 | 0 | 0 | 0 | +0 | — |
| Total | | | | 0 | 0 | 0 | 0 | 0 | 0 | +0 | — |

Source: Competitions

=== Ekstraklasa ===
| Pos | Team | Pld | W | D | L | GF | GA | GD | Pts | Qualification or relegation |
|---|---|---|---|---|---|---|---|---|---|---|
| 14 | Cracovia | 3 | 0 | 2 | 1 | 0 | 2 | −2 | 2 | |
| 15 | Korona Kielce | 2 | 0 | 1 | 1 | 1 | 2 | −1 | 1 | |
| 16 | Motor Lublin | 3 | 0 | 1 | 2 | 4 | 7 | −3 | 1 | Relegation to I liga |
| 17 | Raków Częstochowa | 2 | 0 | 0 | 2 | 2 | 4 | −2 | 0 | Relegation to I liga |
| 17 | Wieczysta Kraków | 2 | 0 | 0 | 2 | 2 | 4 | −2 | 0 | Relegation to I liga |

Updated to match(es) played on 3 August 2026. Source: ekstraklasa.org 90minut.pl
Rules for classification: 1) Points; 2) Head-to-head points; 3) Head-to-head goal difference; 4) Goal difference; 5) Goals scored; 6) Number of wins; 7) Number of away wins; 8) Lower number of points based on yellow and red cards (red card = 3 points, yellow card = 1 point, sending-off = 3 points - including 1 point for first yellow card); 9) Fairplay ranking; 10) Draw.
(Note: Head-to-head record is used only after all the matches between the teams in question have been played)

==== Matches ====
| 24 July 2026 1 | Radomiak Radom | 2–1 | Wieczysta Kraków | Radom |
| 18:00 | Conrado (yellow card) 24'; Tapsoba (yellow card) 28'; Roberto Alves 43'; Grzesik 49'; Donis (yellow card) 90+4' | | Đermanović (yellow card) 5'; Dujmovic (yellow card) 8'; Villar (yellow card) 39'; Feiertag 57'; Lederman (yellow card) 67'; Mikkel Maigaard (yellow card) 85' (yellow-red card) 90' | Stadium: Stadion im. Braci Czachorów; Referee: Jarosław Przybył |

| 1 August 2026 2 | Wieczysta Kraków | v | Lech Poznań | Kraków |
| 17:30 | | | | Stadium: Henryk Reyman Municipal Stadium |
