= Patryk Romanowski =

Polish footballer (born 2004)

Personal information
- Date of birth: 22 February 2004 (age 22)
- Place of birth: Płock, Poland
- Height: 1.85 m (6 ft 1 in)
- Position: Defender

Team information
- Current team: Resovia
- Number: 77

Youth career
- 2014–2017: PAF Płońsk
- 2017–2020: Escola Varsovia
- 2020–2022: Legia Warsaw

Senior career*
Years	Team	Apps	(Gls)
2022–2023	Legia Warsaw II	2	(0)
2023–2025	Motor Lublin	2	(0)
2024	→ Polonia Bytom (loan)	16	(1)
2025	→ Znicz Pruszków (loan)	7	(0)
2025–	Resovia	20	(1)

International career
2018–2019	Poland U15	4	(0)
2019–2020	Poland U16	6	(0)
- * Club domestic league appearances and goals as of 20:36, 9 June 2026 (UTC)

Patryk Romanowski (born 22 February 2004) is a Polish professional footballer who plays as a defender for II liga club Resovia.

== Career ==
=== Youth career ===
In his youth career, he played in PAF Płońsk from 2014 to 2017. In 2017, he moved to Escola Varsovia. In 2020, he joined Legia Warsaw's youth system.

=== Legia Warsaw II ===
He made his debut in Legia Warsaw II in a 2–2 home draw against KS Kutno on 4 July 2022. During that match, he came off the bench in the 88th minute, replacing Bartosz Widejko. In the first club of his senior career, he was assigned jersey number 4.

=== Motor Lublin ===
On 19 January 2023, he was transferred to Motor Lublin, signing a two-season deal with an option for a third year. After being assigned a squad number #8, he made his debut on 23 September 2023, in a 4–1 away loss to Wisła Kraków; he came off the bench in 60th minute, replacing Sebastian Rudol. Romanowski made one more appearance for Motor during the 2023–24 season, in a 1–0 Polish Cup loss to Puszcza Niepołomice.

==== Loan to Polonia Bytom ====
On 1 February 2024, Romanowski joined II liga club Polonia Bytom for the remainder of the season. In Polonia, he was given squad number 5. He debuted there in a 2–2 home draw with Skra Częstochowa, it was also his debut in a starting lineup. He scored his first goal in his senior career in the 50th minute of a 3–0 home victory over Lech Poznań II.

==== Return to Motor ====
He returned to Motor following the conclusion of the 2023–24 season, and was assigned a new jersey number 3. Romanowski made his Ekstraklasa debut in a 0–0 home draw with Puszcza Niepołomice on 30 August 2024.

==== Loan to Znicz ====
On 9 January 2025, Romanowski joined I liga outfit Znicz Pruszków on loan for the remainder of the season.

=== Resovia ===
On 4 July 2025, Romanowski moved to II liga side Resovia on a two-year contract, with an optional third.

== Career statistics ==
As of match played 6 June 2026

Appearances and goals by club, season and competition
Club	Season	League			Polish Cup		Europe		Other		Total	
Club	Season	Division	Apps	Goals	Apps	Goals	Apps	Goals	Apps	Goals	Apps	Goals
Legia Warsaw II	2021–22	III liga, gr. I	2	0	—		—		—		2	0
Legia Warsaw II	2022–23	III liga, gr. I	0	0	0	0	—		—		0	0
Legia Warsaw II	Total		2	0	0	0	—		—		2	0
Motor Lublin	2022–23	II liga	0	0	0	0	—		0	0	0	0
Motor Lublin	2023–24	I liga	1	0	1	0	—		0	0	2	0
Motor Lublin	2024–25	Ekstraklasa	1	0	1	0	—		—		2	0
Motor Lublin	Total		2	0	2	0	—		—		4	0
Polonia Bytom (loan)	2023–24	II liga	15	1	—		—		1 (Note: Appearance in II liga promotion play-offs)	0	16	1
Znicz Pruszków (loan)	2024–25	I liga	7	0	—		—		—		7	0
Resovia	2025–26	II liga	19	1	1	1	—		1 (Note: Appearance in II liga relegation play-offs)	0	21	2
Career total			45	2	3	1	0	0	2	0	50	3
