= Michał Borecki =

Polish footballer

Personal information
- Date of birth: 5 March 1997 (age 29)
- Place of birth: Inowrocław, Poland
- Height: 1.81 m (5 ft 11 in)
- Position: Midfielder

Team information
- Current team: Znicz Pruszków
- Number: 20

Youth career
- Unia Janikowo
- –2013: Chemik Bydgoszcz
- 2013–2016: Lazio

Senior career*
Years	Team	Apps	(Gls)
2017–2019	Chrobry Głogów	44	(4)
2019–2023	KKS Kalisz	115	(8)
2023–2025	Arka Gdynia	42	(1)
2025	→ Znicz Pruszków (loan)	13	(1)
2025–	Znicz Pruszków	33	(2)

International career
2015	Poland U18	4	(1)
2015	Poland U19	4	(0)
- * Club domestic league appearances and goals as of 16:29, 26 May 2026 (UTC)

Michał Borecki (born 5 March 1997) is a Polish professional footballer who plays as a midfielder for II liga club Znicz Pruszków.

== Club career ==
In 2013, Borecki joined the youth academy of Italian Serie A side Lazio, where he suffered an injury.

Before the second half of 2016–17 season, he signed for Chrobry Głogów in the Polish second division, where he made 43 league appearances and scored 4 goals.

In 2019, Borecki signed for Polish fourth division club KKS Kalisz.

On 19 June 2023, Borecki joined I liga club Arka Gdynia on a three-year deal.

On 11 February 2025, he was sent on loan to fellow second-tier club Znicz Pruszków for the rest of the season, with an option for another year. He joined Znicz permanently on 27 June 2025.

== International career ==
Borecki has been capped by Poland at under-16, under-17, under-18 and under-19 levels.

== Career statistics ==
As of match played 24 May 2026

Appearances and goals by club, season and competition
Club	Season	League			Polish Cup		Europe		Other		Total	
Club	Season	Division	Apps	Goals	Apps	Goals	Apps	Goals	Apps	Goals	Apps	Goals
Chrobry Głogów	2016–17	I liga	2	0	—		—		—		2	0
Chrobry Głogów	2017–18	I liga	24	2	1	0	—		—		25	2
Chrobry Głogów	2018–19	I liga	18	2	2	0	—		—		20	2
Chrobry Głogów	Total		44	4	3	0	—		—		47	4
KKS 1925 Kalisz	2019–20	III liga, gr. II	16	0	—		—		—		16	0
KKS 1925 Kalisz	2020–21	II liga	33	1	0	0	—		2 (Note: Appearances in II liga promotion play-offs)	0	35	1
KKS 1925 Kalisz	2021–22	Ekstraklasa	33	5	2	0	—		—		35	5
KKS 1925 Kalisz	2022–23	II liga	31	2	6	2	—		—		37	4
KKS 1925 Kalisz	Total		113	8	8	2	—		2	0	123	10
Arka Gdynia	2023–24	I liga	30	0	3	0	—		2 (Note: Appearance in I liga promotion play-offs)	1	35	1
Arka Gdynia	2024–25	I liga	10	0	2	0	—		—		12	0
Arka Gdynia	Total		40	0	5	0	—		2	1	47	1
Znicz Pruszków (loan)	2024–25	I liga	13	1	—		—		—		13	1
Znicz Pruszków	2025–26	I liga	33	2	1	0	—		—		34	2
Znicz Pruszków	Total		46	3	1	0	—		—		47	3
Career total			243	15	17	2	0	0	4	1	264	18

== Honours ==
KKS Kalisz

- III liga, group II: 2019–20
- Polish Cup (Greater Poland regionals): 2019–20
