= Adrian Małachowski =

Polish footballer (born 1998)

Personal information
- Date of birth: 10 March 1998 (age 28)
- Place of birth: Bydgoszcz, Poland
- Height: 1.83 m (6 ft 0 in)
- Position: Midfielder

Team information
- Current team: Polonia Bytom
- Number: 4

Youth career
- –2012: Zawisza Bydgoszcz
- 2012–2015: Legia Warsaw

Senior career*
Years	Team	Apps	(Gls)
2015–2018	Legia Warsaw II	32	(0)
2017	→ Pogoń Siedlce (loan)	1	(0)
2018	→ Znicz Pruszków (loan)	14	(0)
2018–2019	Znicz Pruszków	29	(2)
2019–2020	GKS Bełchatów	23	(2)
2020–2022	1. FC Magdeburg	45	(0)
2022–2023	Waldhof Mannheim	28	(3)
2023–2024	ŁKS Łódź	6	(0)
2023	ŁKS Łódź II	7	(0)
2024	→ Podbeskidzie (loan)	10	(0)
2025–2026	Resovia	50	(4)
2026–	Polonia Bytom	0	(0)

International career
2014	Poland U17	1	(0)
2015–2016	Poland U18	5	(0)
- * Club domestic league appearances and goals as of 21:07, 18 August 2026 (UTC)

Adrian Małachowski (born 10 March 1998) is a Polish professional footballer who plays as a midfielder for I liga club Polonia Bytom.

== Club career ==
Małachowski moved from Legia Warsaw II to Pogoń Siedlce on loan in 2017. He made his professional debut for Pogoń Siedlce in the I liga on 2 September 2017, starting in the away match against Bytovia Bytów, which finished as a 4–1 loss. He was subsequently loaned to Znicz Pruszków in 2018, before joining the club on a permanent basis.

He transferred to GKS Bełchatów in 2019, and a year later moved to German club 1. FC Magdeburg of the 3. Liga. On 8 May 2022, the same day 1. FC Magdeburg were confirmed champions, it was announced Małachowski would leave the club at the end of the season.

On 14 May 2022, he joined 3. Liga side Waldhof Mannheim.

On 18 August 2023, Małachowski returned to Poland and signed a two-year contract with ŁKS Łódź. On 17 January 2024, he joined I liga side Podbeskidzie on loan until the end of the season. After returning from loan, Małachowski left ŁKS by mutual consent on 4 July 2024.

On 16 January 2025, he joined II liga side Resovia on a six-month contract, with an option for another year. On 18 August 2026, he terminated his contract by mutual consent, citing personal reasons.

On 25 August 2026, Małachowski signed with I liga club Polonia Bytom on a deal until the end of the season.

== International career ==
Małachowski made one appearance for the Poland under-17 national team in 2014, and made five appearances for the under-18 team from 2015 to 2016.

== Honours ==
1. FC Magdeburg

- 3. Liga: 2021–22
