= Michał Pawlik =

Polish footballer

Personal information
- Full name: Michał Pawlik
- Date of birth: 8 May 1995 (age 31)
- Place of birth: Ryki, Poland
- Height: 1.86 m (6 ft 1 in)
- Position: Defensive midfielder

Team information
- Current team: Znicz Pruszków
- Number: 6

Youth career
- –2012: Mazur Karczew
- 2012–2013: Jagiellonia Białystok

Senior career*
Years	Team	Apps	(Gls)
2013–2015	Jagiellonia II	47	(2)
2013–2017	Jagiellonia Białystok	5	(0)
2016	→ Ull/Kisa (loan)	7	(1)
2017–2020	Chrobry Głogów	56	(1)
2020–2021	GKS Bełchatów	28	(0)
2021–2022	Odra Opole	18	(0)
2022	Västerås SK	8	(0)
2023–2024	Górnik Łęczna	25	(0)
2024–	Znicz Pruszków	26	(2)

International career
2013	Poland U18	1	(0)
- * Club domestic league appearances and goals as of 16:20, 26 May 2026 (UTC)

Michał Pawlik (born 8 May 1995) is a Polish professional footballer who plays as a defensive midfielder for II liga club Znicz Pruszków.

== Club career ==
On 11 August 2020, he joined GKS Bełchatów on a one-year contract. On 26 July 2022, he joined Swedish Superettan side Västerås SK.
