= Jakub Wawszczyk =

Polish footballer

Personal information
- Date of birth: 11 January 1998 (age 28)
- Place of birth: Lipno, Poland
- Height: 1.80 m (5 ft 11 in)
- Position: Left-back

Team information
- Current team: Džiugas
- Number: 46

Youth career
- –2011: Mień Lipno
- 2011–2014: Zawisza Bydgoszcz
- 2015: Arka Gdynia

Senior career*
Years	Team	Apps	(Gls)
2015–2019	Arka Gdynia II	32	(1)
2017	→ KS Chwaszczyno (loan)	15	(0)
2017	→ Olimpia Grudziądz (loan)	0	(0)
2018	→ KP Starogard Gdański (loan)	15	(0)
2018–2019	→ Radomiak Radom (loan)	28	(0)
2019–2021	Arka Gdynia	20	(0)
2021–2022	Sandecja Nowy Sącz	3	(0)
2022	Stal Mielec	3	(0)
2022–2023	Polonia Warsaw	25	(0)
2023–2024	Znicz Pruszków	25	(0)
2024–2025	Riteriai	22	(2)
2025–	Džiugas	30	(0)
- * Club domestic league appearances and goals as of 27 July 2026 (UTC)

Jakub Wawszczyk (born 11 January 1998) is a Polish professional footballer who plays as a left-back for TOPLYGA club Džiugas.

== Honours ==
Radomiak Radom

- II liga: 2018–19

Polonia Warsaw

- II liga: 2022–23

Riteriai

- I Lyga: 2024
