= Kamil Dankowski =

Polish professional footballer

Personal information
- Full name: Kamil Dankowski
- Date of birth: 22 July 1996 (age 30)
- Place of birth: Duszniki-Zdrój, Poland
- Height: 1.77 m (5 ft 9 1/2 in)
- Position: Right-back

Team information
- Current team: Wieczysta Kraków
- Number: 17

Youth career
- Nysa Kłodzko
- FC Wrocław Academy
- 2012–2014: Śląsk Wrocław

Senior career*
Years	Team	Apps	(Gls)
2013–2019	Śląsk Wrocław II	41	(2)
2013–2020	Śląsk Wrocław	93	(1)
2020–2025	ŁKS Łódź	120	(5)
2022	ŁKS Łódź II	4	(0)
2025–	Wieczysta Kraków	24	(3)
2026–	Wieczysta Kraków II	5	(2)

International career
2013	Poland U17	2	(0)
2013–2014	Poland U18	7	(0)
2014–2015	Poland U19	12	(1)
2015–2017	Poland U20	9	(0)
2018	Poland U21	1	(0)
- * Club domestic league appearances and goals as of 22:01, 25 June 2026 (UTC)

Kamil Dankowski (born 22 July 1996) is a Polish professional footballer who plays as a right-back for Ekstraklasa club Wieczysta Kraków.

== Club career ==
On 1 September 2020, he joined ŁKS Łódź.

On 17 June 2025, Dankowski signed a two-year deal with I liga newcomers Wieczysta Kraków.

== Career statistics ==
As of match played 31 May 2026

Appearances and goals by club, season and competition
Club	Season	League			Polish Cup		Europe		Total	
Club	Season	Division	Apps	Goals	Apps	Goals	Apps	Goals	Apps	Goals
Śląsk Wrocław II	2013–14	III liga, gr. E	21	1	—		—		21	1
Śląsk Wrocław II	2014–15	III liga, gr. E	2	0	—		—		2	0
Śląsk Wrocław II	2015–16	III liga, gr. E	7	1	—		—		7	1
Śląsk Wrocław II	2016–17	III liga, gr. III	1	0	—		—		1	0
Śląsk Wrocław II	2018–19	IV liga Low. Silesia	2	0	—		—		2	0
Śląsk Wrocław II	2019–20	III liga, gr. III	8	0	—		—		8	0
Śląsk Wrocław II	Total		41	2	—		—		41	2
Śląsk Wrocław	2013–14	Ekstraklasa	2	0	0	0	0	0	2	0
Śląsk Wrocław	2014–15	Ekstraklasa	10	0	1	0	—		11	0
Śląsk Wrocław	2015–16	Ekstraklasa	21	0	3	0	2 (Note: Appearances in UEFA Europa League)	0	26	0
Śląsk Wrocław	2016–17	Ekstraklasa	31	1	1	0	—		32	1
Śląsk Wrocław	2017–18	Ekstraklasa	8	0	0	0	—		8	0
Śląsk Wrocław	2018–19	Ekstraklasa	11	0	1	0	—		12	0
Śląsk Wrocław	2019–20	Ekstraklasa	10	0	1	0	—		11	0
Śląsk Wrocław	Total		93	1	7	0	2	0	101	1
ŁKS Łódź	2020–21	I liga	21	0	1	0	—		22	0
ŁKS Łódź	2021–22	I liga	4	0	0	0	—		4	0
ŁKS Łódź	2022–23	I liga	33	4	0	0	—		33	4
ŁKS Łódź	2023–24	Ekstraklasa	30	0	1	0	—		31	0
ŁKS Łódź	2024–25	I liga	32	1	2	0	—		34	1
ŁKS Łódź	Total		120	5	4	0	—		124	5
ŁKS Łódź II	2021–22	III liga, gr. I	4	0	—		—		4	0
Wieczysta Kraków	2025–26	I liga	24 (Note: Includes two appearances in I liga promotion play-offs)	3	0	0	—		24	3
Wieczysta Kraków II	2025–26	IV liga Les. Poland	5	2	0	0	—		5	2
Career total			287	13	11	0	2	0	300	9

== Honours ==
Śląsk Wrocław II

- III liga, group III: 2019–20
- IV liga Lesser Poland East: 2018–19

ŁKS Łódź

- I liga: 2022–23

Wieczysta Kraków II

- IV liga Lesser Poland: 2025–26
