= 2024–25 Znicz Pruszków season =

Znicz Pruszków
2024–25 season
- Manager: Grzegorz Szoka
- Stadium: Stadion Znicza Pruszków
- I liga: Pre-season
- Polish Cup: Pre-season
- Top goalscorer: League: Łukasz Wiech (1); All: Łukasz Wiech (1)
Home colours	Away colours

The 2024–25 season was the 102nd season in the history of Znicz Pruszków, and the club's second consecutive season in the I liga. In addition to the domestic league, the team competed in the Polish Cup.

On 14 June, Znicz Pruszków appointed Grzegorz Szoka as its coach.

== Transfers ==
=== In ===
Pos.	Player	Transferred from	Fee	Date	Source
FW	(Poland) Bartłomiej Ciepiela	(Poland) Legia Warsaw	Loan	16 July 2024	
DF	(Poland) Łukasz Wiech	(Poland) Wisła Puławy	Undisclosed	16 July 2024	
FW	(Poland) Dominik Sokół	(Poland) Radomiak Radom	Free	17 July 2024	

=== Out ===
Pos.	Player	Transferred to	Fee	Date	Source
DF	(Poland) Jakub Wawszczyk		End of contract	15 July 2024	

== Friendlies ==
=== Pre-season ===
3 July 2024 Friendly	Wisła Płock (Poland)	2–0	(Poland) Znicz Pruszków	Kępa
12:15	Sekulski 32'; Kuczko 58' (pen.)			Stadium: BoniFaCio Spa & Sport Resort; Referee: Tomasz Marciniak

6 July 2024 Friendly	Motor Lublin (Poland)	0–3	(Poland) Znicz Pruszkow	Lublin
14:00			Majewski 21'; Karol 75'; Stanclik 77'	Stadium: boczne boisko Areny Lublin

23 July 2024 Friendly	Znicz Pruszków (Poland)	2–2	(Israel) Hapoel Tel Aviv

== Competitions ==
=== Overall record ===
Competition	First match	Last match	Starting round	Record							
Competition	First match	Last match	Starting round	Pld	W	D	L	GF	GA	GD	Win %
I liga	19 July 2024	25–26 May 2025	Matchday 1	4	2	2	0	4	2	+2	50.00
Polish Cup				0	0	0	0	0	0	+0	—
Total				4	2	2	0	4	2	+2	50.00

Last updated: 9 August 2024
Source: Soccerway

=== I liga ===
==== League table ====
Pos	Team	Pld	W	D	L	GF	GA	GD	Pts	Promotion or Relegation
6	Polonia Warsaw	34	16	8	10	46	37	+9	56 (Note: Ranked based on goal difference: Miedź Legnica +11, Polonia Warsaw +9.)	Qualification for the promotion play-offs
7	GKS Tychy	34	13	14	7	47	36	+11	53	
8	Znicz Pruszków	34	14	10	10	52	43	+9	52	
9	Górnik Łęczna	34	13	11	10	50	42	+8	50	
10	Ruch Chorzów	34	13	9	12	50	46	+4	48	

Source: 1liga.org, 90minut.pl
Rules for classification: 1) Points; 2) Head-to-head points; 3) Head-to-head goal difference; 4) Goal difference; 6) Goals scored; 7) Number of wins; 8) Number of away wins.
(Note: Head-to-head record is used only after all the matches between the teams in question have been played)
Notes:

Semi-finals; 29 May 2025
3	Wisła Płock	2
6	Polonia Warsaw	1
4	Wisła Kraków	0
5	Miedź Legnica	1

Final; 1 June 2025
3	Wisła Płock	2
5	Miedź Legnica	0

==== Results summary ====
Overall								Home						Away					
Pld	W	D	L	GF	GA	GD	Pts	W	D	L	GF	GA	GD	W	D	L	GF	GA	GD
4	2	2	0	4	2	+2	8	1	0	0	2	1	+1	1	2	0	2	1	+1

Last updated: 9 August 2024.

==== Results by round ====
Round	1	2	3	4
Ground	A	A	H	A
Result	W	D	W	D
Position	4			

Updated to match(es) played on 9 August 2024. Source:
A = Away; H = Home; W = Win; D = Draw; L = Loss

==== Matches ====
The match schedule was released on 12 June 2024.

19 July 2024 1	Polonia Warsaw	0–1	Znicz Pruszków	Warsaw
18:00			Wiech 88'	Stadium: Kazimierz Sosnkowski Stadium; Referee: Jacek Małyszek

28 July 2024 2	Ruch Chorzów	0–0	Znicz Pruszków	Chorzów
17:00				Stadium: Ruch Chorzów Stadium; Referee: Sebastian Krasny

4 August 2024 3	Znicz Pruszków	2–1	Wisła Kraków	Pruszków
14:30	Wiech 76'; Stanclik 90+4' (pen.)		Rodado 18'; Kiss (yellow card) 66' (yellow-red card) 73'	Stadium: Stadion Znicza Pruszków; Referee: Damian Kos

9 August 2024 4	Arka Gdynia	1–1	Znicz Pruszków	Gdynia
20:30 UTC+2	Oliveira 14'		Nowak 12'	Stadium: Gdynia Stadium; Attendance: 4,997; Referee: Patryk Gryckiewicz

=== Polish Cup ===
Znicz Pruszków was knocked out in the first round of the Polish Cup by Chojniczanka Chojnice, 3-2.
