= Łukasz Wiech =

Polish association football player

Personal information
- Full name: Łukasz Wiech
- Date of birth: 25 March 1997 (age 29)
- Place of birth: Lublin, Poland
- Height: 1.94 m (6 ft 4 in)
- Position: Centre-back

Team information
- Current team: ŁKS Łódź
- Number: 5

Youth career
- –2013: BKS Lublin
- 2013–2014: Śląsk Wrocław

Senior career*
| Years | Team | Apps | (Gls) |
| 2014–2020 | Śląsk Wrocław | 0 | (0) |
| 2015–2020 | Śląsk Wrocław II | 52 | (1) |
| 2017–2018 | → Górnik Łęczna (loan) | 19 | (1) |
| 2019 | → Ruch Chorzów (loan) | 12 | (1) |
| 2020–2021 | Radomiak Radom | 0 | (0) |
| 2021 | → Wisła Puławy (loan) | 18 | (0) |
| 2021–2024 | Wisła Puławy | 84 | (3) |
| 2024 | Znicz Pruszków | 8 | (3) |
| 2024– | ŁKS Łódź | 18 | (0) |

International career
| 2015 | Poland U18 | 6 | (0) |
| 2016 | Poland U19 | 2 | (0) |
| 2017 | Poland U20 | 1 | (0) |
- * Club domestic league appearances and goals as of 15:42, 29 May 2026 (UTC)

Łukasz Wiech (born 25 March 1997) is a Polish professional footballer who plays as a centre-back for I liga club ŁKS Łódź.

== Senior career ==
Wiech started his career coming through the Śląsk Wrocław youth system. In 2016, Wiech played for Śląsk's reserve team in the III liga. In 2017, he moved to Górnik Łęczna on loan. The loan was successful, however he suffered a knee injury at the end of his loan, which put him out of contention for six months, hampering any chance of another loan or promotion to the first team.

On 22 September 2020, he signed a one-year contract with Radomiak Radom.

== Honours ==
Śląsk Wrocław II

- III liga, group III: 2019–20

Wisła Puławy

- III liga, group IV: 2020–21
- Polish Cup (Lublin subdistrict regionals): 2020–21
