= Koki Hinokio =

Japanese footballer (born 2001)

Personal information
- Date of birth: 26 February 2001 (age 25)
- Place of birth: Osaka, Japan
- Height: 1.65 m (5 ft 5 in)
- Position: Midfielder

Team information
- Current team: ŁKS Łódź
- Number: 8

Youth career
- 2016–2018: Kumiyama High School

Senior career*
Years	Team	Apps	(Gls)
2019–2021	Stomil Olsztyn	50	(7)
2021–2023	Zagłębie Lubin	15	(0)
2021–2022	Zagłębie Lubin II	9	(0)
2021–2022	→ Stal Mielec (loan)	14	(1)
2023–2025	Stal Mielec	56	(4)
2025–	ŁKS Łódź	37	(5)
2025	ŁKS Łódź II	3	(1)
- * Club domestic league appearances and goals as of 15:52, 29 May 2026 (UTC)

Koki Hinokio (檜尾 昂樹, Hinokio Kōki; born 26 February 2001) is a Japanese professional footballer who plays as a midfielder for Polish club ŁKS Łódź.

== Career statistics ==
As of match played 28 May 2026

Appearances and goals by club, season and competition
Club	Season	League			Polish Cup		Other		Total	
Club	Season	Division	Apps	Goals	Apps	Goals	Apps	Goals	Apps	Goals
Stomil Olsztyn	2019–20	I liga	19	2	1	0	—		20	2
Stomil Olsztyn	2020–21	I liga	31	5	1	0	—		32	5
Stomil Olsztyn	Total		50	7	2	0	—		52	7
Zagłębie Lubin	2021–22	Ekstraklasa	7	0	0	0	—		7	0
Zagłębie Lubin	2022–23	Ekstraklasa	8	0	2	0	—		10	0
Zagłębie Lubin	Total		15	0	2	0	—		17	0
Zagłębie Lubin II	2021–22	III liga, gr. III	3	0	—		—		3	0
Zagłębie Lubin II	2022–23	II liga	6	0	—		—		6	0
Zagłębie Lubin II	Total		9	0	—		—		9	0
Stal Mielec (loan)	2021–22	Ekstraklasa	14	1	1	0	—		15	1
Stal Mielec	2022–23	Ekstraklasa	14	1	—		—		14	1
Stal Mielec	2023–24	Ekstraklasa	32	3	3	0	—		35	3
Stal Mielec	2024–25	Ekstraklasa	10	0	1	0	—		11	0
Stal Mielec	Total		70	5	5	0	—		75	5
ŁKS Łódź	2024–25	I liga	12	0	—		—		12	0
ŁKS Łódź	2025–26	I liga	24	5	0	0	1 (Note: Appearance in I liga promotion play-offs)	0	25	5
ŁKS Łódź	Total		36	5	0	0	1	0	37	5
ŁKS Łódź II	2025–26	II liga	3	1	—		—		3	1
Career total			183	18	9	0	1	0	193	18

== Honours ==
Zagłębie Lubin II

- III liga, group III: 2021–22
