= Nikolas Korzeniecki =

Canadian soccer player

Personal information
- Date of birth: 26 September 2001 (age 25)
- Place of birth: Vancouver, British Columbia, Canada
- Height: 1.86 m (6 ft 1 in)
- Position: Midfielder

Youth career
- Port Moody Soccer Club
- 2018–2019: Śląsk Wrocław

Senior career*
Years	Team	Apps	(Gls)
2019	Chrobry Głogów II	1	(0)
2020–2022	Zagłębie Sosnowiec II	9	(0)
2020–2022	Zagłębie Sosnowiec	28	(2)
2022–2023	Radomiak Radom	0	(0)
2022–2023	Radomiak Radom II	12	(1)
2023	Warta Poznań	0	(0)
2023	Chrobry Głogów	0	(0)
2023	Chrobry Głogów II	6	(0)
- * Club domestic league appearances and goals as of 29 May 2024

Nikolas Korzeniecki (born 26 September 2001) is a Canadian professional soccer player who plays as a midfielder.

== Career ==
Korzeniecki joined the youth academy of Canadian side Port Moody Soccer Club. In 2018, he moved to the youth academy of Śląsk Wrocław.

In 2019, he signed for Polish fifth division club Chrobry Głogów II.

In 2020, Korzeniecki signed for Zagłębie Sosnowiec in the Polish second division.

In July 2022, he joined Ekstraklasa side Radomiak Radom.

On 25 January 2023, having mostly played for Radomiak's reserve side and making one cup appearance for the senior squad, he left to join another top flight side Warta Poznań on a six-month contract.

On 11 August 2023, he returned to Chrobry Głogów.
