= Bartosz Szeliga =

Polish footballer

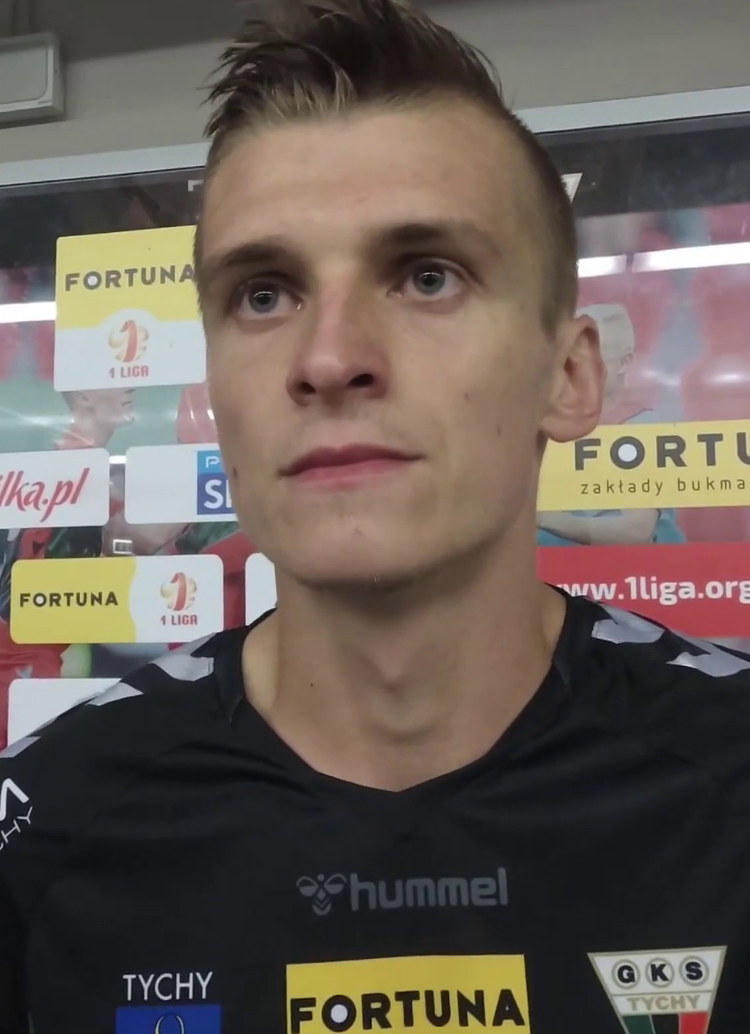
- Szeliga with GKS Tychy in 2019

Personal information
- Full name: Bartosz Szeliga
- Date of birth: 10 January 1993 (age 33)
- Place of birth: Nowy Sącz, Poland
- Height: 1.84 m (6 ft 0 in)
- Position: Full-back

Team information
- Current team: Sandecja Nowy Sącz
- Number: 18

Youth career
- –2010: Sandecja Nowy Sącz

Senior career*
Years	Team	Apps	(Gls)
2010–2013	Sandecja Nowy Sącz	36	(5)
2013–2017	Piast Gliwice	98	(11)
2013–2017	Piast Gliwice II	14	(5)
2017–2019	Bruk-Bet Termalica	35	(1)
2019–2021	GKS Tychy	49	(4)
2021–2024	ŁKS Łódź	84	(7)
2024–2025	Warta Poznań	26	(2)
2025–2026	Stal Mielec	25	(1)
2026–	Sandecja Nowy Sącz	0	(0)

International career
2013	Poland U20	2	(0)
- * Club domestic league appearances and goals as of 21:11, 26 May 2026 (UTC)

Bartosz Szeliga (born 10 January 1993) is a Polish professional footballer who plays as a full-back for II liga club Sandecja Nowy Sącz.

== Career statistics ==
As of match played 24 May 2026

Appearances and goals by club, season and competition
Club	Season	League			Polish Cup		Europe		Other		Total	
Club	Season	Division	Apps	Goals	Apps	Goals	Apps	Goals	Apps	Goals	Apps	Goals
Sandecja Nowy Sącz	2010–11	I liga	7	0	0	0	—		—		7	0
Sandecja Nowy Sącz	2011–12	I liga	14	2	1	0	—		—		15	2
Sandecja Nowy Sącz	2012–13	I liga	15	3	1	0	—		—		16	3
Sandecja Nowy Sącz	Total		36	5	2	0	—		—		38	5
Piast Gliwice	2012–13	Ekstraklasa	2	0	—		—		—		2	0
Piast Gliwice	2013–14	Ekstraklasa	14	1	0	0	0	0	—		14	1
Piast Gliwice	2014–15	Ekstraklasa	31	5	4	0	—		—		35	5
Piast Gliwice	2015–16	Ekstraklasa	25	3	0	0	—		—		25	3
Piast Gliwice	2016–17	Ekstraklasa	26	2	1	0	2 (Note: Appearances in UEFA Europa League)	0	—		29	2
Piast Gliwice	Total		98	11	5	0	2	0	—		105	11
Piast Gliwice II	2013–14	III liga, gr. F	8	2	—		—		—		8	2
Piast Gliwice II	2014–15	III liga, gr. F	4	1	—		—		—		4	1
Piast Gliwice II	2017–18	IV liga Silesia I	2	2	—		—		—		2	2
Piast Gliwice II	Total		14	5	—		—		—		14	5
Bruk-Bet Termalica	2017–18	Ekstraklasa	20	1	1	1	—		—		21	2
Bruk-Bet Termalica	2018–19	I liga	15	0	3	0	—		—		18	0
Bruk-Bet Termalica	Total		35	1	4	1	—		—		39	2
GKS Tychy	2019–20	I liga	19	1	2	0	—		—		21	1
GKS Tychy	2020–21	I liga	29	3	1	0	—		1 (Note: Appearance in I liga promotion play-offs)	0	31	3
GKS Tychy	Total		48	4	3	0	—		1	0	52	4
ŁKS Łódź	2021–22	I liga	28	1	2	0	—		—		30	1
ŁKS Łódź	2022–23	I liga	27	6	0	0	—		—		27	6
ŁKS Łódź	2023–24	Ekstraklasa	29	0	1	0	—		—		30	0
ŁKS Łódź	Total		84	7	3	0	—		—		87	6
Warta Poznań	2024–25	I liga	26	2	2	0	—		—		28	2
Stal Mielec	2025–26	I liga	25	1	1	0	—		—		26	1
Sandecja Nowy Sącz	2026–27	II liga	0	0	—		—		—		0	0
Career total			366	36	20	1	2	0	1	0	389	37

== Honours ==
ŁKS Łódź

- I liga: 2022–23
