= Mateusz Kupczak =

Polish footballer

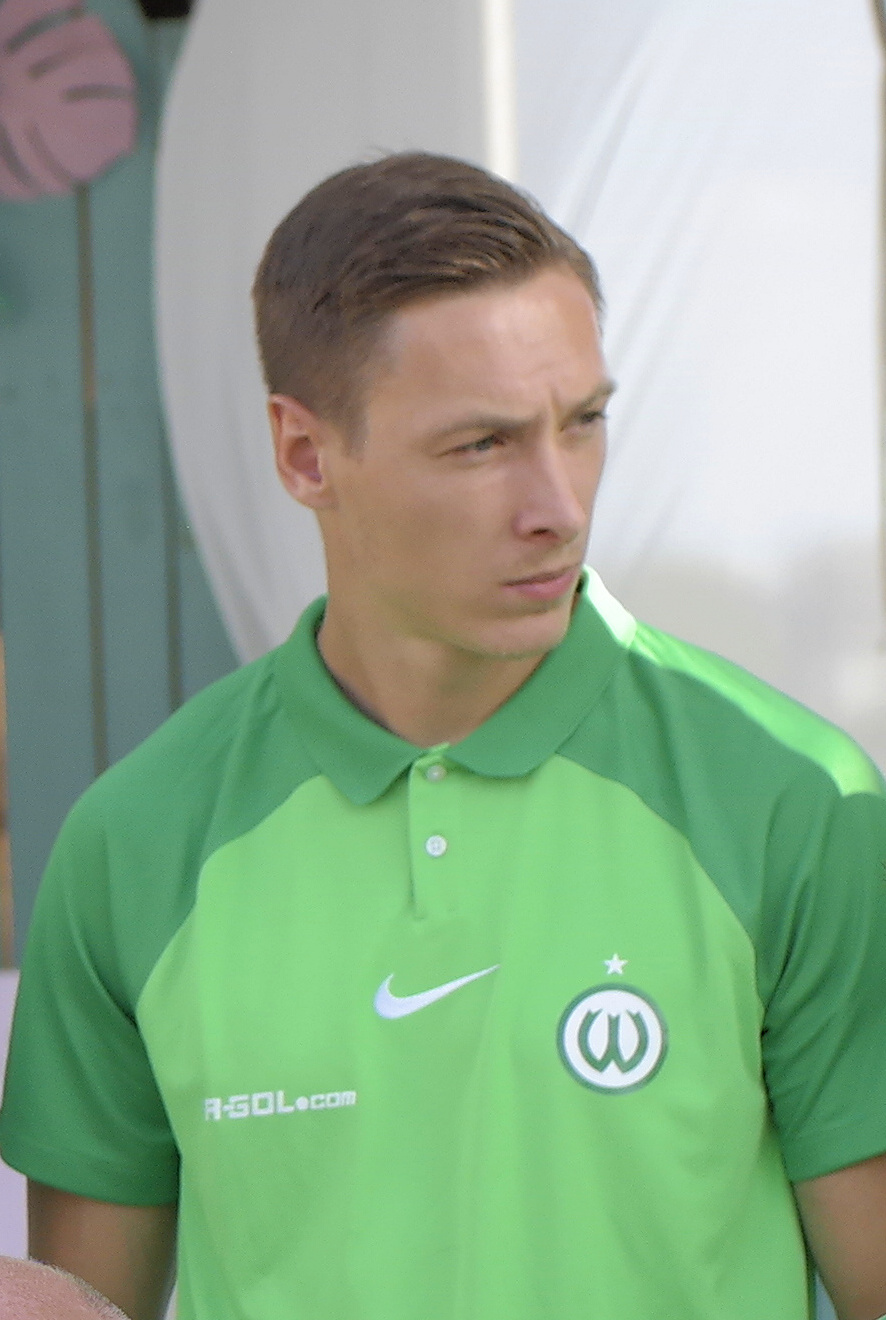
- Kupczak as Warta Poznań player in 2023

Personal information
- Full name: Mateusz Kupczak
- Date of birth: 20 February 1992 (age 34)
- Place of birth: Żywiec, Poland
- Height: 1.87 m (6 ft 2 in)
- Position: Defensive midfielder

Team information
- Current team: ŁKS Łódź
- Number: 21

Youth career
- ŻAPN Żywiec
- Koszarawa Żywiec
- Czarni-Góral Żywiec

Senior career*
Years	Team	Apps	(Gls)
2010	Podbeskidzie	0	(0)
2011	Skałka Żabnica	14	(1)
2011–2013	GKS Tychy	60	(3)
2013–2014	Podbeskidzie	10	(0)
2014–2019	Bruk-Bet Termalica	167	(7)
2019–2024	Warta Poznań	141	(21)
2024–	ŁKS Łódź	56	(1)
- * Club domestic league appearances and goals as of 15:44, 29 May 2026 (UTC)

Mateusz Kupczak (born 20 February 1992) is a Polish professional footballer who plays as a defensive midfielder for I liga club ŁKS Łódź.
