= Stefan Feiertag =

Austrian footballer (born 2001)

Personal information
- Date of birth: 18 December 2001 (age 24)
- Place of birth: Horn, Austria
- Height: 1.86 m (6 ft 1 in)
- Position: Forward

Team information
- Current team: Wieczysta Kraków
- Number: 18

Youth career
- –2014: SV Horn
- 2014–2019: SKN St. Pölten
- 2019: Austria Wien

Senior career*
Years	Team	Apps	(Gls)
2019–2021	Austria Wien II	42	(5)
2021–2023	SKU Amstetten	53	(29)
2023–2025	Blau-Weiß Linz	27	(1)
2024–2025	→ ŁKS Łódź (loan)	18	(8)
2025	→ 1. FC Saarbrücken (loan)	11	(2)
2025–	Wieczysta Kraków	29	(18)

International career
2015–2016	Austria U15	7	(1)
2016	Austria U16	2	(0)
2017	Austria U17	1	(0)
2018	Austria U18	5	(2)
- * Club domestic league appearances and goals as of 16:06, 25 July 2026 (UTC)

Stefan Feiertag (born 18 December 2001) is an Austrian professional footballer who plays as a forward for Ekstraklasa club Wieczysta Kraków.

== Early life ==
Feiertag was born on 18 December 2001 in Horn, Austria. The nephew of Austrian footballer Alfons Baumgartner, he is the cousin of Austrian footballers Dominik Baumgartner and Christoph Baumgartner.

== Career ==
As a youth player, Feiertag joined the youth academy of Austrian side SV Horn. In 2014, he joined the youth academy of Austrian side SKN St. Pölten, where he received interest from a German Bundesliga side. The same year, he joined the youth academy of Austrian side Austria Wien, where he started his senior career with the club's reserve team.

Two years later, he signed for Austrian side SKU Amstetten. Following his stint there, he signed for Austrian side Blau-Weiß Linz in 2023. While playing for the club during the 2023–24 Austrian Football Bundesliga, he made twenty-seven league appearances and scored one goal. Subsequently, he was sent on loan to Polish side ŁKS Łódź in 2024. On 31 January 2025, Feiertag moved on a new loan to 1. FC Saarbrücken in German 3. Liga.

On 14 August 2025, Feiertag moved back to the Polish second division, signing a one-year deal with recently promoted Wieczysta Kraków.

== Honours ==
Individual

- I liga Player of the Month: October 2024, May 2026
