= Michał Mokrzycki =

Polish footballer

Personal information
- Date of birth: 29 December 1997 (age 28)
- Place of birth: Rzeszów, Poland
- Height: 1.82 m (6 ft 0 in)
- Position: Defensive midfielder

Team information
- Current team: Śląsk Wrocław
- Number: 14

Youth career
- –2007: Sokół Kolbuszowa Dolna
- 2007–2010: MKS Kolbuszowa
- 2010–2011: Stal Rzeszów
- 2011–2012: Stal Mielec
- 2012–2013: MKS Kolbuszowa
- 2013–2015: Korona Kielce

Senior career*
Years	Team	Apps	(Gls)
2016–2017	Korona Kielce	1	(0)
2017	→ Stal Stalowa Wola (loan)	11	(0)
2017–2019	Wisła Sandomierz	41	(2)
2019–2022	Ruch Chorzów	88	(24)
2022–2023	Wisła Płock	3	(0)
2023	→ ŁKS Łódź (loan)	16	(1)
2023–2026	ŁKS Łódź	74	(8)
2026–	Śląsk Wrocław	15	(2)
- * Club domestic league appearances and goals as of 12:42, 11 August 2026 (UTC)

Michał Mokrzycki (born 29 December 1997) is a Polish professional footballer who plays as a defensive midfielder for Ekstraklasa club Śląsk Wrocław.

== Honours ==
Wisła Sandomierz

- Polish Cup (Świętokrzyskie regionals): 2017–18

Ruch Chorzów

- III liga, group III: 2020–21
- Polish Cup (Katowice regionals): 2020–21

ŁKS Łódź

- I liga: 2022–23
