= Kamil Pestka =

Polish footballer

Personal information
- Full name: Kamil Pestka
- Date of birth: 22 August 1998 (age 28)
- Place of birth: Kraków, Poland
- Height: 1.89 m (6 ft 2 in)
- Position: Left-back

Team information
- Current team: Wieczysta Kraków
- Number: 33

Youth career
- 2009–2011: Prokocim Kraków
- 2011–2012: Hutnik Nowa Huta
- 2012–2014: Progres Kraków
- 2014–2017: Cracovia

Senior career*
Years	Team	Apps	(Gls)
2017–2023	Cracovia	84	(6)
2019	→ Chrobry Głogów (loan)	12	(1)
2023–2025	Raków Częstochowa	12	(0)
2025	Radomiak Radom	6	(1)
2025–	Wieczysta Kraków	31	(1)

International career
2017	Poland U20	2	(0)
2018–2019	Poland U21	16	(0)
- * Club domestic league appearances and goals as of 21:12, 31 May 2026 (UTC)

Kamil Pestka (born 22 August 1998) is a Polish professional footballer who plays as a left-back for Ekstraklasa club Wieczysta Kraków.

== International career ==
Pestka was called up to the senior Poland squad for the UEFA Nations League matches against Wales, Belgium, Netherlands and Belgium again, on 1, 8, 11 and 14 June 2022.

== Honours ==
Cracovia

- Polish Cup: 2019–20

Cracovia II

- IV liga Lesser Poland West: 2019–20
