= Sebastian Rudol =

Polish footballer (born 1995)

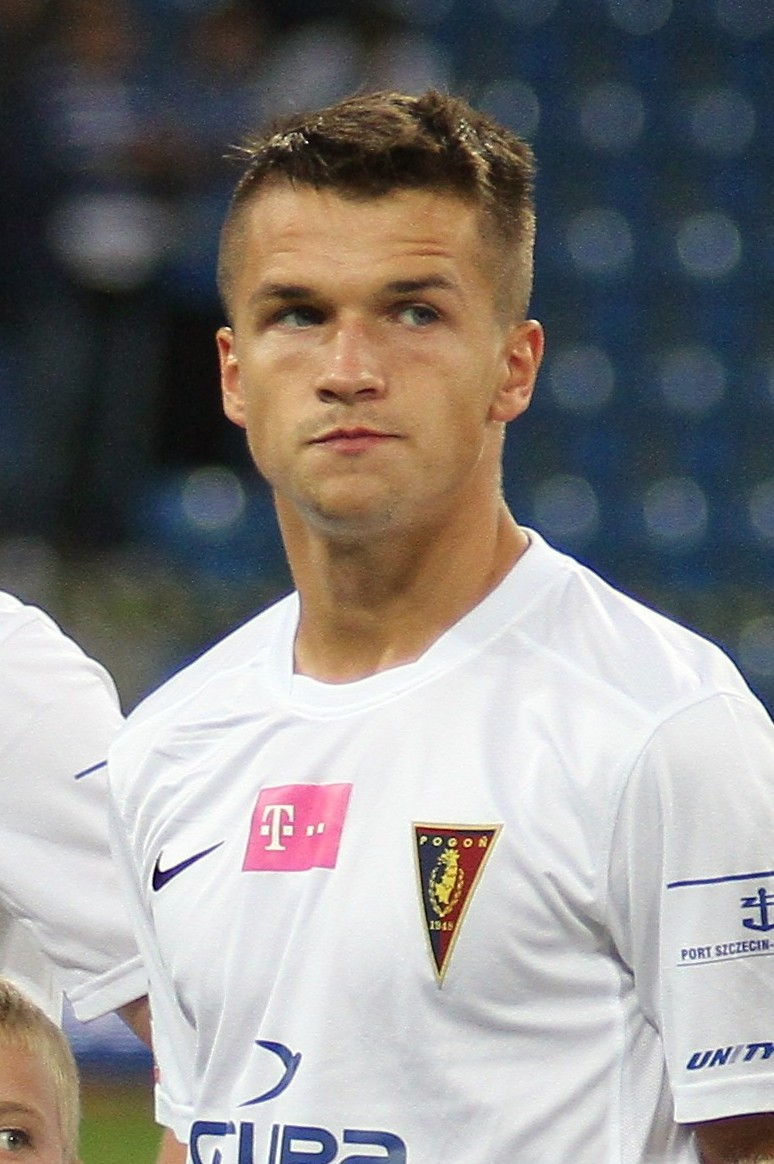
- Rudol with Pogoń Szczecin in 2014

Personal information
- Full name: Sebastian Rudol
- Date of birth: 21 February 1995 (age 31)
- Place of birth: Koszalin, Poland
- Height: 1.83 m (6 ft 0 in)
- Position: Centre-back

Team information
- Current team: ŁKS Łódź
- Number: 6

Youth career
- Gwardia Koszalin
- Bałtyk Koszalin
- Salos Szczecin
- 2011–2012: Pogoń Szczecin

Senior career*
Years	Team	Apps	(Gls)
2012–2018	Pogoń Szczecin II	42	(2)
2012–2019	Pogoń Szczecin	130	(2)
2019	Sepsi OSK	6	(0)
2019–2021	Widzew Łódź	26	(0)
2021–2022	Sandecja Nowy Sącz	26	(1)
2022–2025	Motor Lublin	75	(7)
2025–	ŁKS Łódź	46	(2)

International career
2010–2011	Poland U16	3	(0)
2012	Poland U17	7	(0)
2012–2013	Poland U18	7	(0)
2014	Poland U19	5	(0)
2014–2015	Poland U20	5	(0)
2015–2016	Poland U21	4	(0)
- * Club domestic league appearances and goals as of 15:55, 29 May 2026 (UTC)

Sebastian Rudol (born 21 February 1995) is a Polish professional footballer who plays as a centre-back for and captains I liga club ŁKS Łódź.

== Career statistics ==
As of match played 28 May 2026

Appearances and goals by club, season and competition
Club	Season	League			National cup (Note: Includes Polish Cup, Cupa României)		Europe		Total	
Club	Season	Division	Apps	Goals	Apps	Goals	Apps	Goals	Apps	Goals
Pogoń Szczecin II	2012–13	III liga, gr. D	12	0	—		—		12	0
Pogoń Szczecin II	2013–14	III liga, gr. D	9	0	—		—		9	0
Pogoń Szczecin II	2015–16	III liga, gr. D	2	1	—		—		2	1
Pogoń Szczecin II	2017–18	III liga, gr. II	9	1	—		—		9	1
Pogoń Szczecin II	2018–19	III liga, gr. II	10	0	—		—		10	0
Pogoń Szczecin II	Total		42	2	—		—		42	2
Pogoń Szczecin	2012–13	Ekstraklasa	3	0	0	0	—		3	0
Pogoń Szczecin	2013–14	Ekstraklasa	12	1	0	0	—		12	1
Pogoń Szczecin	2014–15	Ekstraklasa	35	0	1	0	—		36	0
Pogoń Szczecin	2015–16	Ekstraklasa	22	0	1	0	—		23	0
Pogoń Szczecin	2016–17	Ekstraklasa	30	0	6	0	—		36	0
Pogoń Szczecin	2017–18	Ekstraklasa	18	1	0	0	—		18	1
Pogoń Szczecin	2018–19	Ekstraklasa	10	0	1	0	—		11	0
Pogoń Szczecin	Total		130	2	9	0	—		139	2
Sepsi OSK	2018–19	I liga	6	0	1	0	—		7	0
Widzew Łódź	2019–20	II liga	22	0	2	0	—		24	0
Widzew Łódź	2020–21	I liga	4	0	1	0	—		5	0
Widzew Łódź	Total		26	0	3	0	—		29	0
Sandecja Nowy Sącz	2021–22	I liga	26	1	1	0	—		27	1
Motor Lublin	2022–23	II liga	33 (Note: Includes two appearances in I liga promotion play-offs)	2	5	1	—		38	3
Motor Lublin	2023–24	I liga	28 (Note: Includes one appearance in I liga promotion play-offs)	3	0	0	—		28	3
Motor Lublin	2024–25	Ekstraklasa	14	2	1	0	—		15	2
Motor Lublin	Total		75	7	6	1	—		81	8
ŁKS Łódź	2024–25	I liga	14	1	—		—		14	1
ŁKS Łódź	2025–26	I liga	32	1	2	0	—		34	1
ŁKS Łódź	Total		46	2	2	0	—		48	2
Career total			351	14	22	1	—		373	15
