= Znicz Pruszków =

Association football club

- Full name: Miejski Klub Sportowy; Znicz Pruszków
- Founded: 1923; 103 years ago
- Ground: Stadion Znicza Pruszków
- Capacity: 2,097
- Chairman: Tomasz Matuszewski
- Manager: Łukasz Smolarow
- League: II liga
- 2025–26: I liga, 16th of 18 (relegated)
- Website: zniczpruszkow.com.pl
Home colours	Away colours

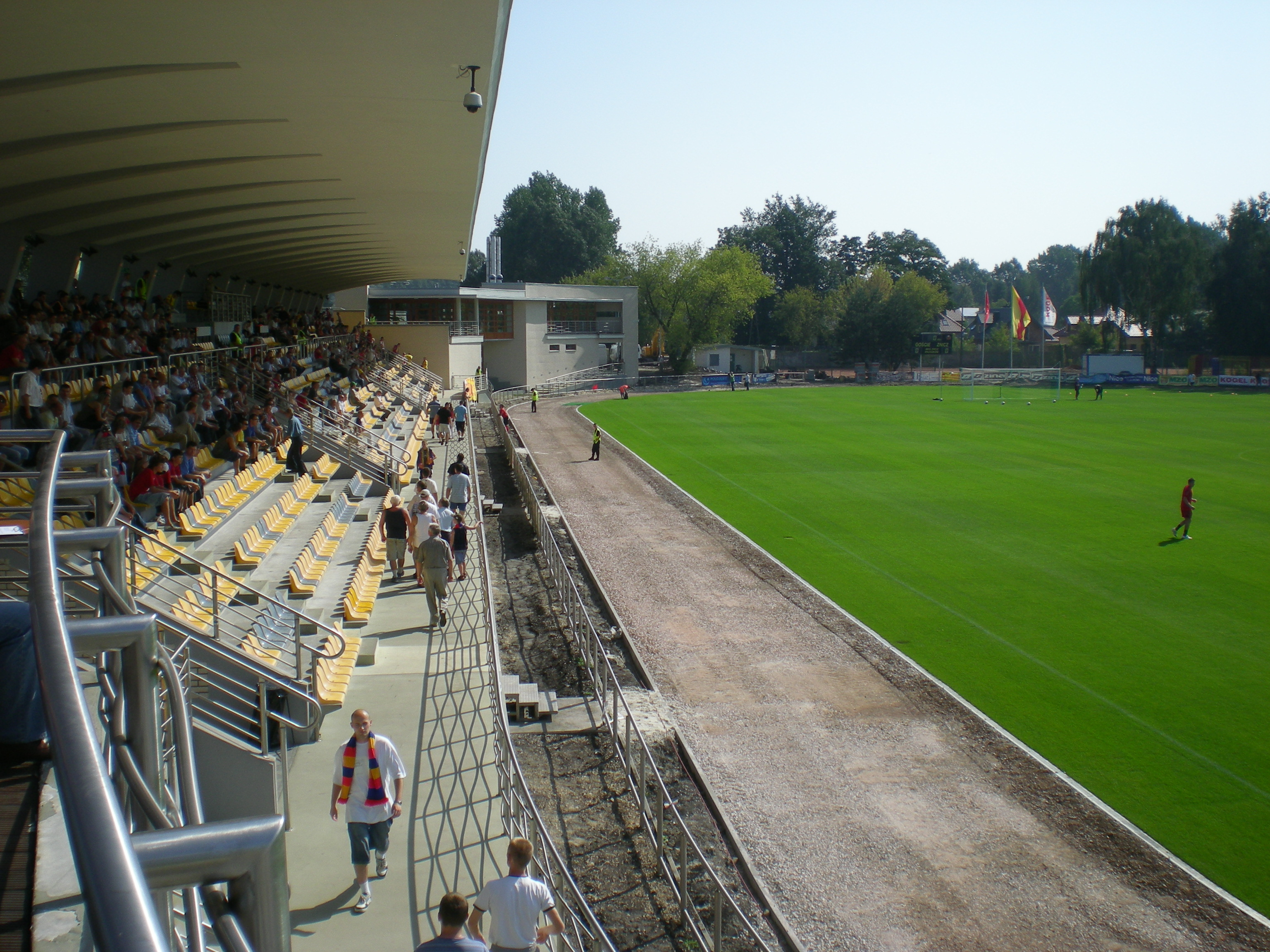
Home ground: Stadion Znicza Pruszków

Miejski Klub Sportowy Znicz Pruszków (Polish pronunciation: [ˈzɲit͡ʂ ˈpruʂkuf]) is a football club based in Pruszków, Poland. They currently compete in the II liga, the third level of the Polish football league system, after suffering relegation in the 2025–26 season.

== Players ==
=== Current squad ===
As of 15 September 2026

Note: Flags indicate national team as defined under FIFA eligibility rules; some limited exceptions apply. Players may hold more than one non-FIFA nationality.

No.	Pos.	Nation	Player
1	GK	POL	Norbert Gzowski
2	DF	POL	Mateusz Jeleński
3	DF	POL	Filip Hołuj
5	MF	POL	Marcel Broniewski
6	MF	POL	Michał Pawlik
7	MF	POL	Dawid Barnowski
8	MF	POL	Aleksander Nadolski
9	MF	POL	Antoni Bartoszewicz
10	DF	POL	Jarosław Jach (captain)
11	MF	POL	Tymon Proczek
13	FW	POL	Bartosz Mazurek
14	MF	UKR	Vladyslav Okhronchuk
15	FW	POL	Mateusz Głowiński

No.	Pos.	Nation	Player
16	FW	POL	Dominik Szafrański
17	FW	POL	Adrian Kazimierczak
18	MF	POL	Filip Drabik
20	MF	POL	Michał Borecki
21	MF	POL	Aleksander Redliński
22	MF	POL	Szymon Cieloch
23	GK	POL	Kacper Napieraj
25	MF	POL	Jan Kosmalski
26	MF	POL	Wiktor Kieszek
27	FW	POL	Oskar Garbiński
32	GK	POL	Maciej Sypniewski
37	MF	POL	Nikodem Zawistowski
77	MF	POL	Adam Ratajczyk (on loan from Widzew Łódź II)

=== Notable players ===
The best known player from Znicz Pruszków is Robert Lewandowski, who played for Znicz from 2006 to 2008, being top scorer of the league in both his seasons in the club and helping the team achieve promotion to the I liga in 2007.

== Domestic record ==
Domestic Record
Season	League	Ranking	Remarks
1997–98	Liga okręgowa (grupa Warszawa)	1	Promoted
1998–99	IV liga (grupa warsz.-maz.)	6	
1999–00	IV liga (grupa warsz.-maz.)	1	Promoted
2000–01	III liga (grupa I)	6	
2001–02	III liga (grupa I)	10	
2002–03	III liga (grupa I)	12	
2003–04	III liga (grupa I)	7	
2004–05	III liga (grupa I)	2	Play-offs 1 liga
2005–06	III liga (grupa I)	5	
2006–07	III liga (grupa I)	1	Promoted
2007–08	I liga	5	
2008–09	I liga	6	
2009–10	I liga	16	Relegated
2010–11	II liga (grupa wschodnia)	6	
2011–12	II liga (grupa wschodnia)	4	
2012–13	II liga (grupa wschodnia)	6	
2013–14	II liga (grupa wschodnia)	6	
2014–15	II liga	9	
2015–16	II liga	2	Promoted
2016–17	I liga	17	Relegated
2017–18	II liga	13	
2018–19	II liga	8	
2019–20	II liga	9	
2020–21	II liga	15	
2021–22	II liga	14	
2022–23	II liga	2	Promoted
2023–24	I liga	13	
2024–25	I liga	8	
2025–26	I liga	16	Relegated

Legend
Color marking
2nd tier
3rd tier
4th tier
5th tier
