= Obelisk in Charzewice =

- Obelisk w Charzewicach
- Location: Charzewice, Stalowa Wola, Poland
- Coordinates: 50°36′15.8″N 22°02′12.5″E
- Type: Obelisk
- Material: Stone boulder
- Completion date: 1974
- Dedicated to: Victims of the execution on 20 October 1943

Obelisk in Charzewice is located in Stalowa Wola, at the site of the execution of 25 hostages on 20 October 1943.

== Execution in 1943 ==
This was a response by the Germans to the killing of Martin Fuldner by two Poles, who carried out a death sentence on him and his family on behalf of the Underground Court of the Republic of Poland. The Germans reacted by issuing a proclamation of the execution of 25 hostages, should the residents of Rozwadów and its surroundings fail to capture the murderers.

The list included: Tomasz Bednarz, Zdzisław Bzowe, Stefan Chuchro, Marian Dyduch, Jan Gaweł, Adam Hillenbrandt, Julian Kalandyk, Władysław Kalandyk, Paweł Kilian, Julian Kluz, Adam Kochański, Tadeusz Kąkol, Tadeusz Kowalczyk, Józef Krucha, Tadeusz Mikoła, Mieczysław Niedziocha, Ignacy Lubera, Jan Otyl, Roman Popiołek, Michał Paczek, Stanisław Rusek, Jadwiga Latasiewicz, Zuzanna Latasiewicz, Antonina Łysak, Jan Lubera.

The sentence was carried out near the manor in Charzewice, by the park fence at a place called "Maźnica". Sources mention that during the hour of death, conditional absolution was given to the victims by Father Kosma from the nearby monastery, who was hidden in a nearby house. The bodies of the victims were dragged to a pit at the edge of the fields and buried, with the traces of the crime erased.

On 25 October 1947, the victims of the execution were exhumed. Fifteen were taken to their family homes, while the remaining victims, for whom no one claimed, were transferred to a mass grave near the cemetery in Rozwadów.

== Monument description ==
In 1974, a cross and a monument were erected at the site of the massacre. A stone lies at the base, and on it, an eagle without a crown along with the inscription “For Poland, Freedom, and People”.
