= Charzewice =

Charzewice may refer to:

- Charzewice, Stalowa Wola, a district of Stalowa Wola, Poland
- Charzewice, Tarnów County, a village in the Lesser Poland Voivodeship, in Tarnów County, in the Gmina Zakliczyn
- Charzewice (municipality), a former rural municipality
- Charzewice (gromada in Brzesko County), a gromada in Brzesko County
- Charzewice (gromada in Tarnobrzeg County), a gromada in Tarnobrzeg County
