= Zamość railway station =

Railway station in Zamość, Poland

Zamość
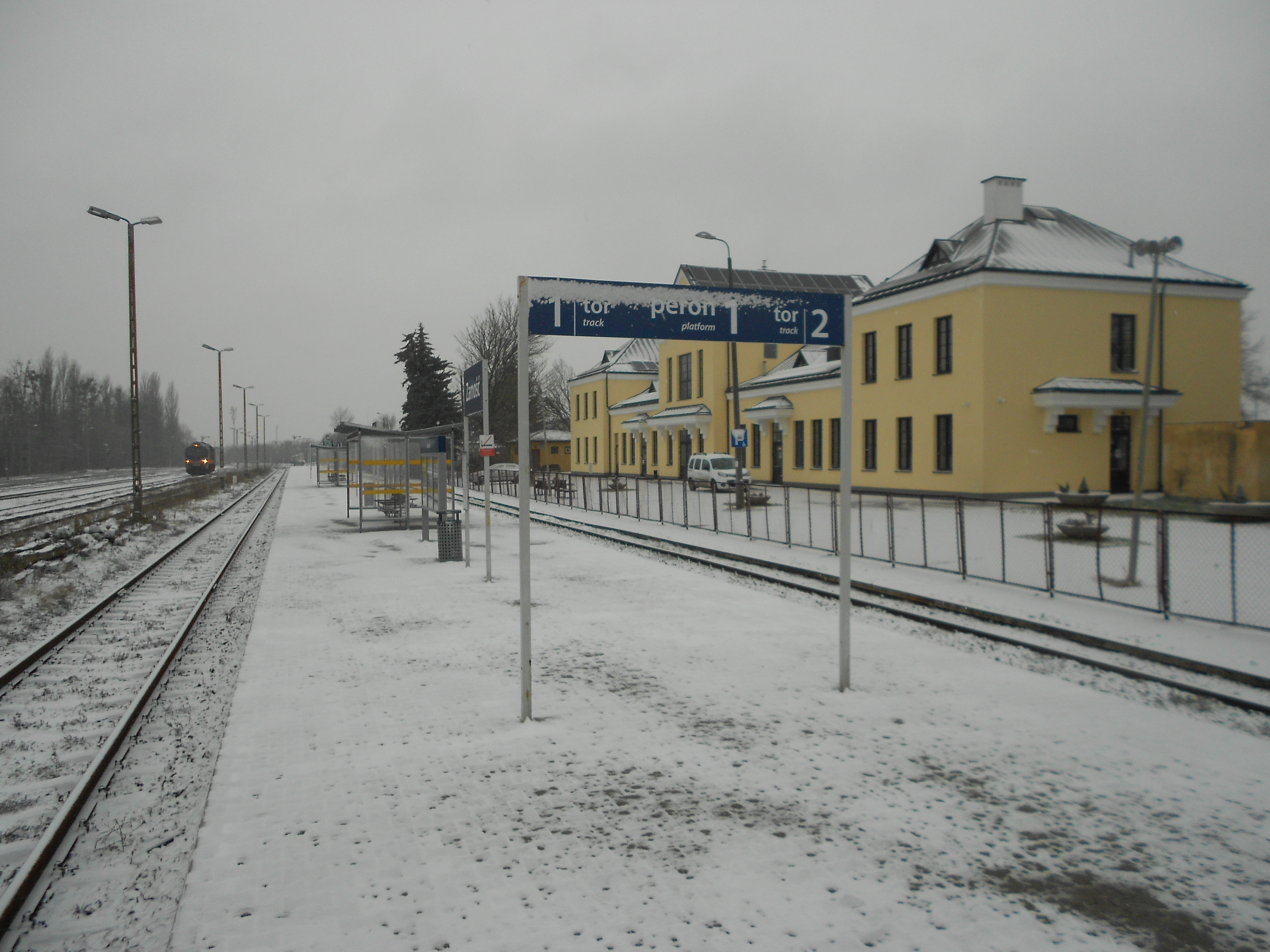

General information
- Location: Zamość, Lublin Voivodeship; Poland
- Coordinates: 50°42′49″N 23°14′21″E
- Owner: Polskie Koleje Państwowe S.A.
- Platforms: 1

History
- Opened: 1916
Location

Zamość railway station (Polish for Stacja Zamość) is located in Zamość, Poland on Szczebrzeska Street, near the zoological garden. The station was opened in 1916. Demolished during World War II, its building was twice rebuilt in 1944 and 1963. Since 2015 the building is owned by the city of Zamość.

Apart from freight rail transport it is served by the passenger long-distance trains run by PKP Intercity to e.g.:

- Bydgoszcz via: Lublin, Warsaw, Toruń,
- Hrubieszów,
- Kraków via: Stalowa Wola, Tarnów,

as well as regional trains run by Polregio to e.g.:

- Lublin (daily)
- Bełżec of Roztocze (seasonal).

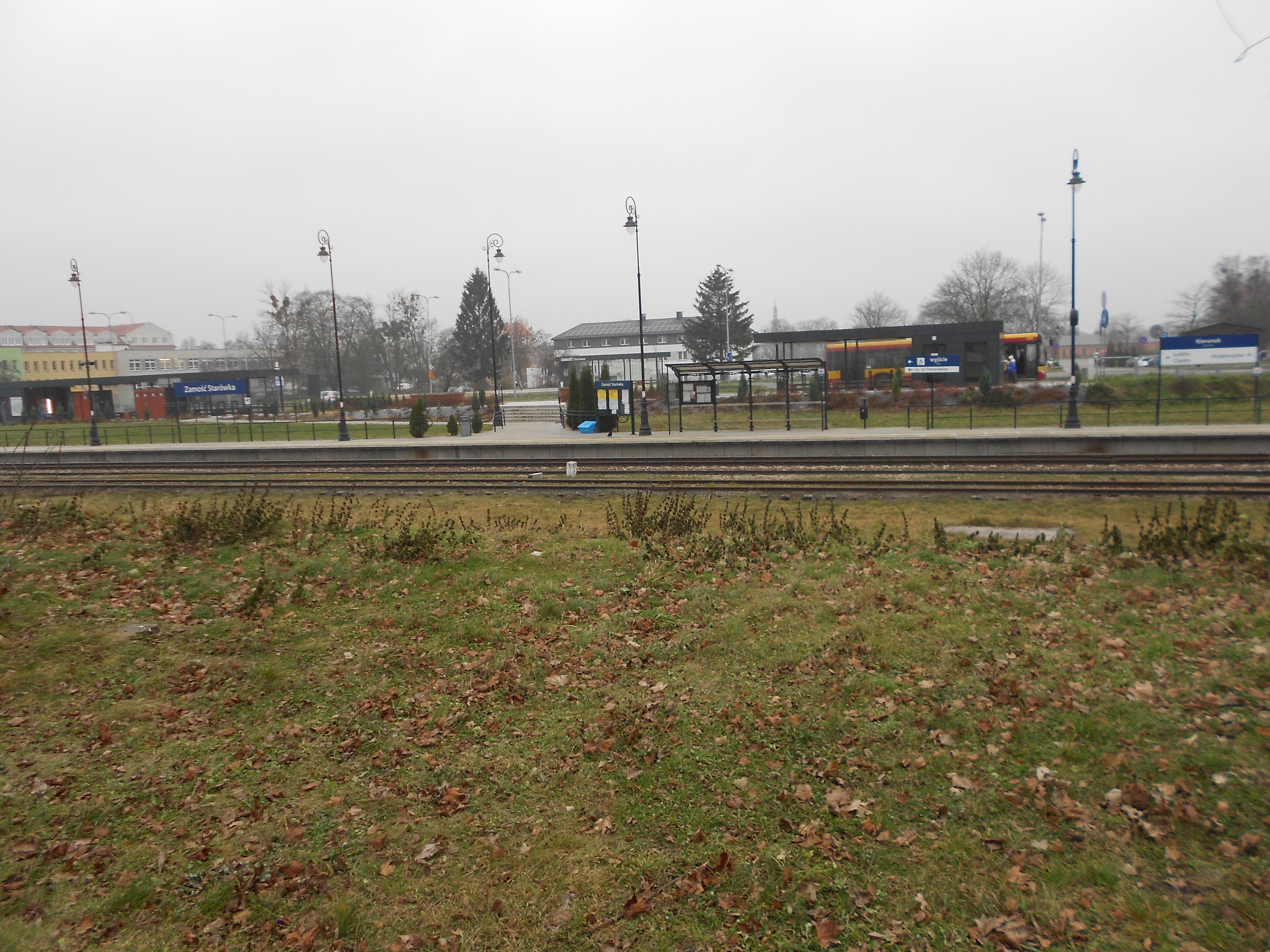
Zamość Starówka train stop Coordinates 50°43′01″N 23°15′46″E

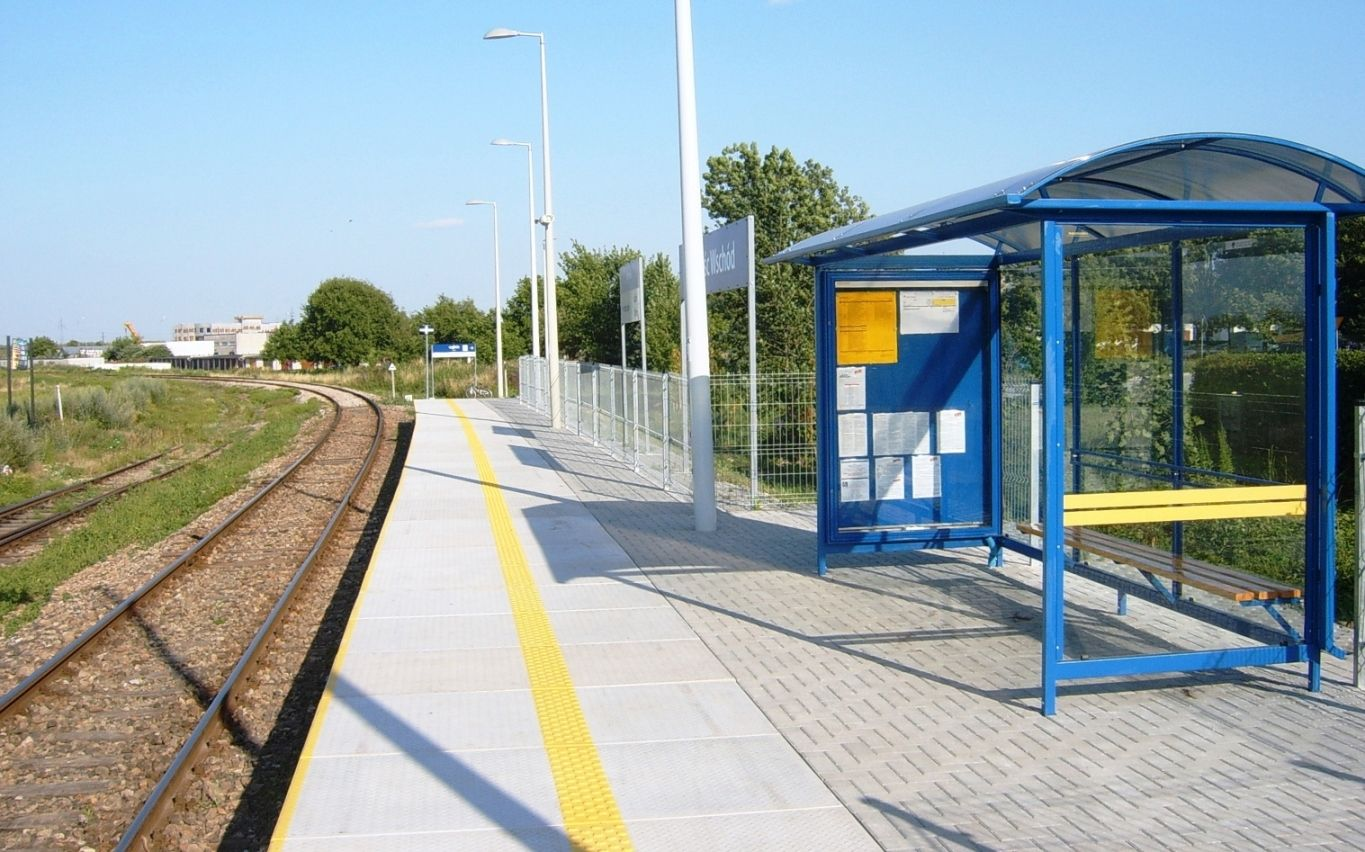
Zamość Wschód train stop Coordinates 50°43′21″N 23°16′36″E

Within the town there are also two train stops: Zamość Starówka (on Peowiaków Street) and Zamość Wschód (on Zamoyskiego Street) served by all the trains mentioned above. They are communicated with the municipal bus links.

Preceding station	PKP Intercity	Following station
Zawada towards Bydgoszcz Główna	IC	Zamość Starówka towards Hrubieszów Miasto
Zawada towards Kraków Główny	IC	Zamość Starówka towards Hrubieszów Miasto
Preceding station	Polregio	Following station
Mokre towards Bełżec	PR	Zamość Starówka towards Zamość Wschód
Mokre towards Lublin Główny	PR	Zamość Starówka towards Zamość Wschód

== See also ==
- Rail transport in Poland
