= Józef Skoczyński =

Polish Catholic priest (1903–1967)

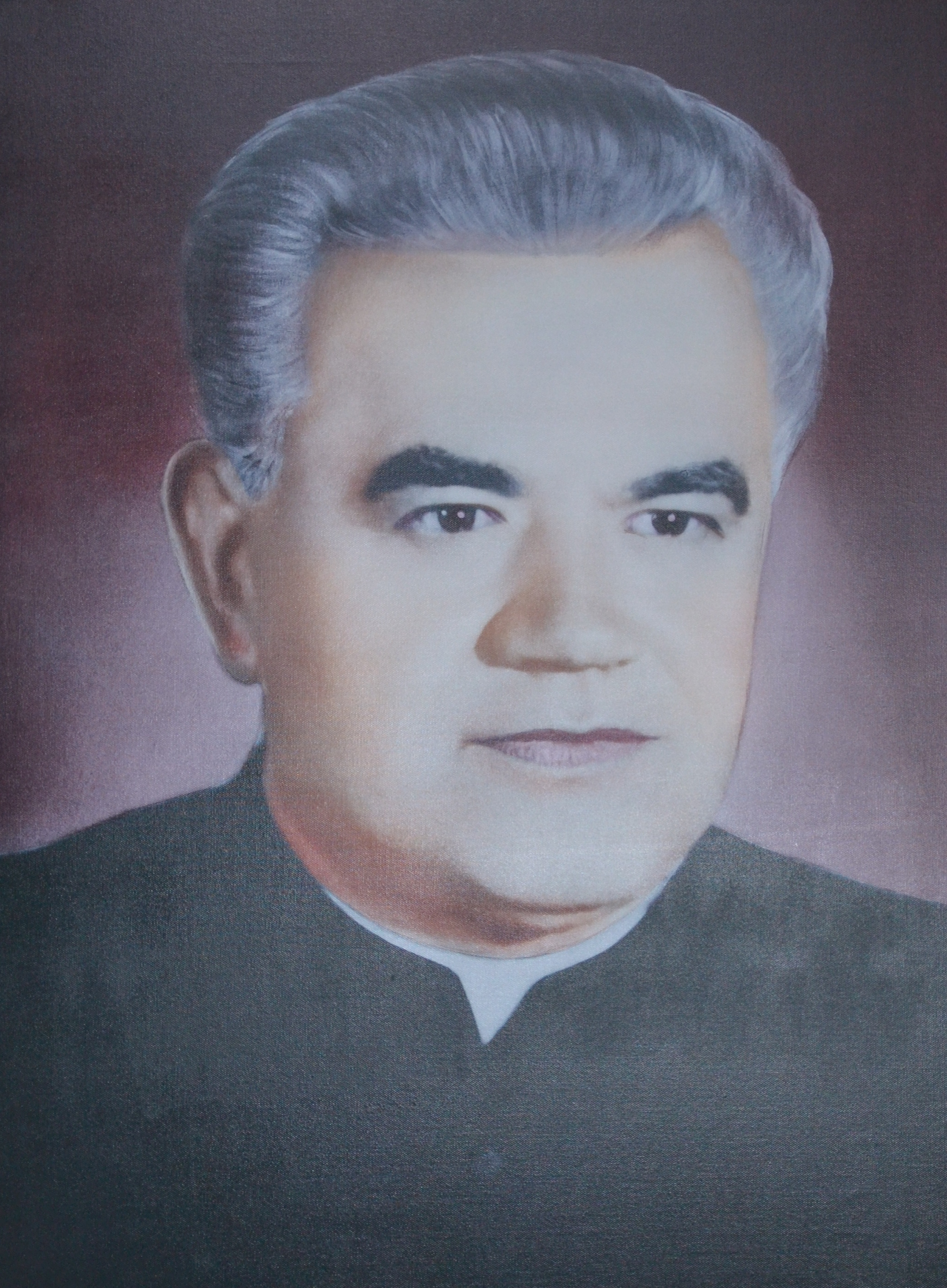
- Portrait of Prelate Józef Skoczyński at the John Paul II Museum in Stalowa Wola
- Born: 6 March 1903; Rymanów
- Died: 20 November 1967 (aged 64); Stalowa Wola
- Title: Prelate

Józef Skoczyński (6 March 1903 – 20 November 1967) was a Polish Catholic priest and social activist. He served as a vicar and catechist in various parishes, including Grodzisk, Dobromil, and Jeżowe, and was deeply involved in pastoral work and community development in Stalowa Wola. Skoczyński played a significant role during World War II by saving many residents from German persecution and was a chaplain of the Home Army. He was also a prominent figure in the post-war period, contributing to local infrastructure projects and the electrification of Pławo, as well as serving as chairman of the National Council in Stalowa Wola.

== Biography ==
=== Early life ===
He was born on 6 March 1903 in Rymanów. He was the eldest of five children of Szymon and Maria (née Ziajka). He had, among others, a brother Adam, who became a doctor in Sanok.

On 22 June 1921, he passed his maturity exam at the Państwowe Gimnazjum in Sanok (his classmates included Stanisław Hroboni, Józef Lubowiecki, Józef Stachowicz). He graduated from the Higher Seminary in Przemyśl. He was ordained a priest on 29 June 1925 by Bishop Anatol Nowak. He served as a vicar in Grodzisk, Dobromil, and as a catechist in Jeżowe.

=== Pastoral work ===
After ordination, he began his pastoral work as a vicar in Grodzisk (1925–29), then in Dobromil (1929–32), where he was also the parish administrator for the last month. From 20 October 1932, he worked as a vicar in Jeżowe, and from 1933 to 1939, he was a catechist in that parish. On 10 January 1939, he started working as a catechist in Stalowa Wola, although he arrived to the city only on 25 January.

The early years of his pastoral work in Stalowa Wola were interrupted by World War II. After the challenging period of German occupation, the times of the PRL and communist rule were equally difficult for the Church. During this period, Fr. Skoczyński began building a new church dedicated to the Queen of Poland, which he could not finish. In 1961, the authorities revoked the permit to continue the construction. Then came illness, which prevented the priest from seeing the work resumed after a 10-year break and the consecration of the church, which was completed on 2 December 1973 by Cardinal Karol Wojtyła, the Metropolitan of Kraków.

=== Social activity ===
During World War II, Fr. Józef Skoczyński saved the lives of many residents of Stalowa Wola by effectively intervening in their defense. He was a chaplain of the Home Army in the Nisko district. Along with several conspiratorial activists, he organized a citizens' committee that defended the South Plants and Power Stations from destruction by the Germans. After the city's liberation, he oversaw maintaining public order during the establishment of the new government. From September 1945 to 13 March 1948, he served as the chairman of the National Council in Stalowa Wola. After the war, he contributed to the electrification of Pławo and to Stalowa Wola receiving municipal rights.

== Burial place ==
He was buried in the Stalowa Wola Municipal Cemetery.

== Honors, titles, awards ==
- 1952 – title of papal chamberlain
- 1953 – vicar of Rudnik, and later dean for eight years

== Commemoration ==
On the street named after Fr. Józef Skoczyński, in honor of this great patriot and social activist, where the rectory once stood and where he lived, now stands the Non-Public Healthcare Facility "Medyk". In the vestibule of the Church of St. Florian and on the facade of the Church of the Queen of Poland in Stalowa Wola, there are memorial plaques dedicated to Fr. Józef Skoczyński. The Museum of John Paul II in Stalowa Wola houses memorabilia related to Fr. Józef Skoczyński and exhibits photographs from the early days of the construction of the Church of the Queen of Poland.

== Gallery ==
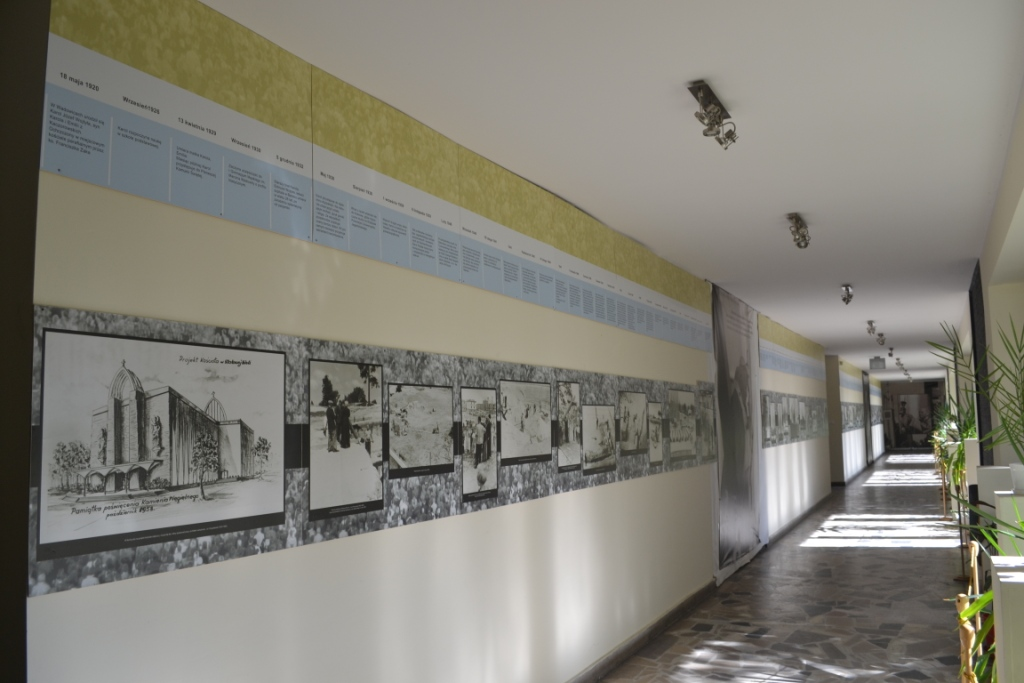
Museum of John Paul II - Corridor

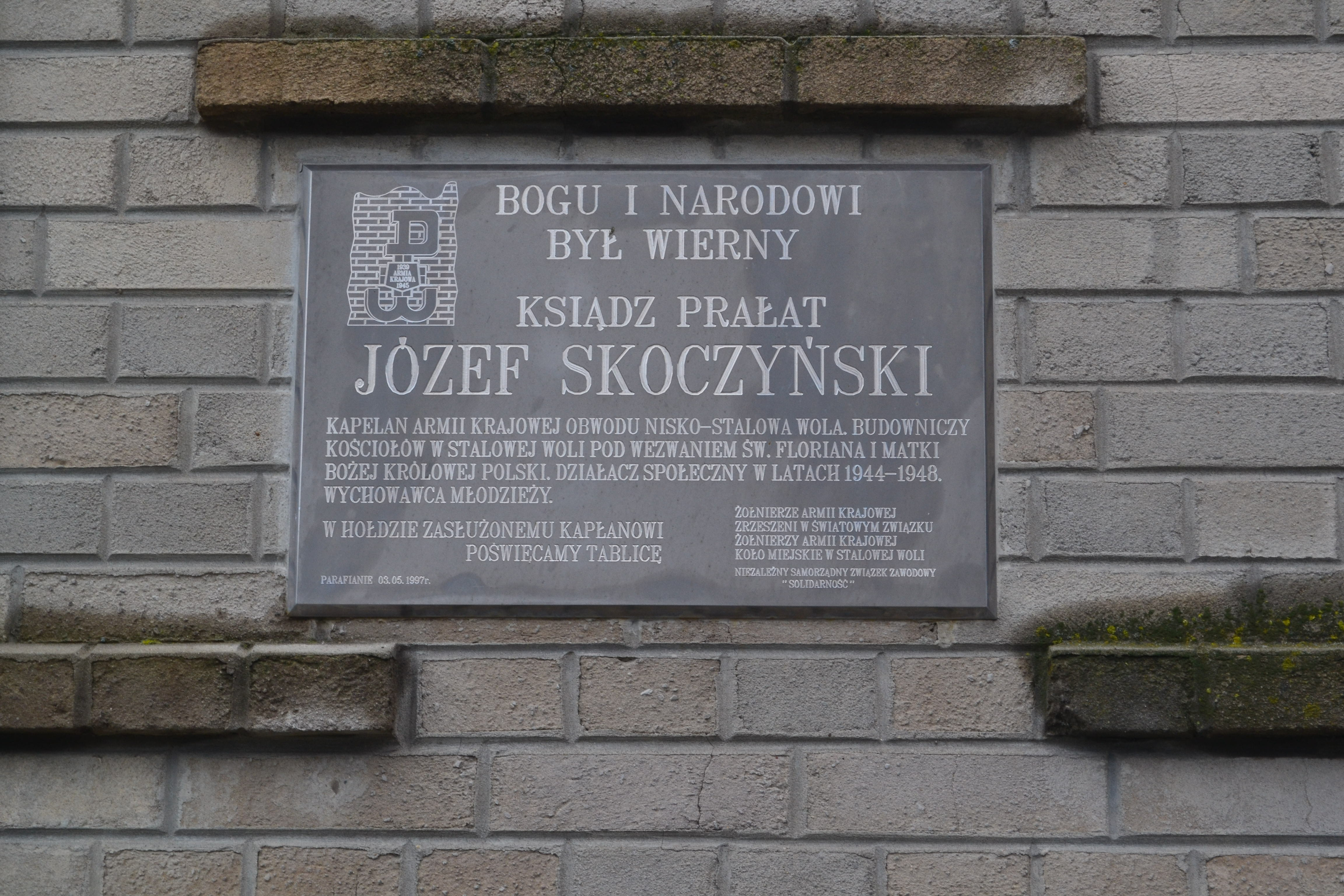
Plaque of Fr. Józef Skoczyński on the facade of the cathedral basilica in Stalowa Wola

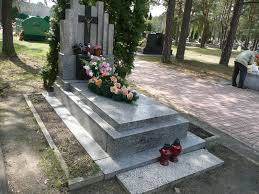
Grave of Fr. Józef Skoczyński in the cemetery in Stalowa Wola

== Bibliography ==
- Gaj-Piotrowski W., Garbacz D., Jańczyk K., Kościół św. Floriana w Stalowej Woli. Miniskansen architektury drewnianej, Stalowa Wola 2007.
- Hałaj Cz., Szambelan ze Stalowej Woli, Tygodnik Katolicki "Niedziela". Edycja sandomierska, nr 1/2008.
- Bandurka Z., Dwa dni w mieście naszej młodości. Sprawozdanie ze zjazdu koleżeńskiego wychowanków Gimnazjum Męskiego w Sanoku w 70-lecie pierwszej matury w roku 1958, Warsaw 1960.
- Przystasz D., Kapłan wielkiej odwagi. Jubileusz 60-lecia kapłaństwa księdza prałata Adama Sudoła, Muzeum Historyczne w Sanoku, Sanok 2004.
