= Rezső Patkoló =

Hungarian-Polish footballer

Personal information
- Date of birth: 13 October 1922
- Place of birth: Budapest, Kingdom of Hungary
- Date of death: 1 September 1992 (aged 69)
- Place of death: Stalowa Wola, Poland
- Position: Striker

Youth career
- 1933–1938: Újpest

Senior career*
Years	Team	Apps	(Gls)
1939–1944	Gamma Budapest		
1944–1948	Újpest		
1948–1950	ŁKS Łódź		
1951	Gwardia Bydgoszcz		
1951–1952	Gwardia Kraków	10	(0)
1953–1956	Stal Stalowa Wola		
1957–1959	Kujawiak Włocławek		

International career
1947	Hungary	2	(0)
1949–1952	Poland	3	(0)
- * Club domestic league appearances and goals

Rezső Patkoló, also known in Poland as Rudolf Patkolo (13 October 1922 – 1 September 1992) was a Hungarian-born footballer who played internationally for both Hungary and Poland. He played as a striker for Gamma Budapest, Újpest, ŁKS Łódź, Gwardia Bydgoszcz, Gwardia Kraków, Stal Stalowa Wola and Kujawiak Włocławek.

He was buried in the Stalowa Wola Municipal Cemetery.
