= Eugene Lazowski =

Polish medical doctor

Eugeniusz Łazowski
- Eugeniusz Łazowski, Poland
- Born: 1913; Częstochowa, Poland
- Died: December 16, 2006 (aged 92–93); Eugene, Oregon, US
- Education: Józef Piłsudski University
- Occupation: Doctor

Eugene Lazowski born Eugeniusz Sławomir Łazowski (1913 – December 16, 2006) was a Polish medical doctor who saved thousands of Polish lives during World War II, particularly by being one of two physicians who created a fake epidemic which played on German phobias about hygiene. Lazowski gained fame from an article that mischaracterized the thousands of lives saved as being Polish Jews, although Lazowski did save many Jews by clandestinely providing medicine to them which was prohibited and punishable by death.

== Early life, family and education ==
Eugeniusz Łazowski was born in Częstochowa, Poland, to a Catholic family.

He obtained a medical degree at the Józef Piłsudski University in Warsaw, Poland, before the onset of World War II.

== World War II ==
During World War II, Łazowski served as a medic in the Polish Army Second Lieutenant. Łazowski was placed in a Soviet prisoner-of-war camp from which he escaped. He worked as a doctor on a Red Cross train, then as a military doctor of the Polish resistance Home Army.

Following the German occupation of Poland, Łazowski resided in the small southeastern Polish village Rozwadów (now a district of Stalowa Wola) with his wife and where their daughter Alexandra was born. in addition to having a medical practice, Łazowski was responsible for treating people travelling through a nearby train station. He used this position to conceal his supply of medicine, providing it clandestinely to Jews in the local ghetto, which backed on to his home. Łazowski risked the death penalty, which was applied to Poles who helped Jews in the Holocaust.

His medical practice was with Dr. Stanisław Matulewicz, a friend from medical school. Like Łazowski, Matulewicz had worked with the Red Cross. He made a medical discovery that healthy people could be injected with the bacterium OX 19 a strain of Proteus that would make them test positive for typhus without experiencing the disease. The two doctors created a fake outbreak of epidemic typhus in 1941–42 in and around Rozwadów, which the Germans then quarantined.

The doctors' fake epidemic has been estimated to have saved about 8,000 people from being sent to German concentration camps, although his own memoir and his daughter who translated it to English disprove the claim that the vast number of people saved were Jewish. The journalist of the article that generated the legend that 8,000 Jewish people were saved admitted to a documentarian that the article's main facts were not verified, in part using the excuse that he didn't know Polish.

== Move to the US ==
In 1958, Lazowski emigrated with his wife Maria and daughter Alexandra to the US on a scholarship from the Rockefeller Foundation. In 1984, he became a professor of pediatrics at the University of Illinois at Chicago. He wrote over a hundred scientific dissertations.

== Personal life and death ==
Lazowski and his wife Maria had a daughter, Alexandra, born in 1942 in Rozwadow. They emigrated to the US in 1958 and settled in Chicago, Illinois.

He may have reduced his workload practicing medicine in the 1980s, but he did not fully retire until 2004. During his semi-retirement, he wrote a memoir, Prywatna wojna: wspomnienia lekarza-żołnierza, 1933-1944 (Private War: Memoirs of a Medical Soldier, 1933-1944), published in Polish in 1993 and translated to English by his daughter Alexandra.

Dr. Łazowski died in 2006 in Chicago. He had been residing in Eugene, Oregon, with his daughter.

== In media ==
In 2001, Ryan Bank began work on A Private War, a documentary about Lazowski which chronicles Lazowski's visit to Poland as well as recorded testimonies of people whose families were saved by the fake epidemic. It is unknown if the film was ever completed or released.

In 2019, journalist Barbara Necek directed In Search of the Polish Schindler, a documentary film about Lazowski which examines and debunks the legend of the doctor saving Jews with the typhus injections, including interviews with the journalist who propagated the myth and Lazowski 's daughter who recounted her father enjoying his fame and never disputing the myth, even though his memoir proved the impossibility of the claim: Jews infected with typhus were shot and their homes were burned, and the area where the Lazowski family resided had nowhere close to 8,000 Jewish people to be saved.
