= Stalowa Wola Municipal Cemetery =

Coordinates: 50°33′58″N 22°02′22″E

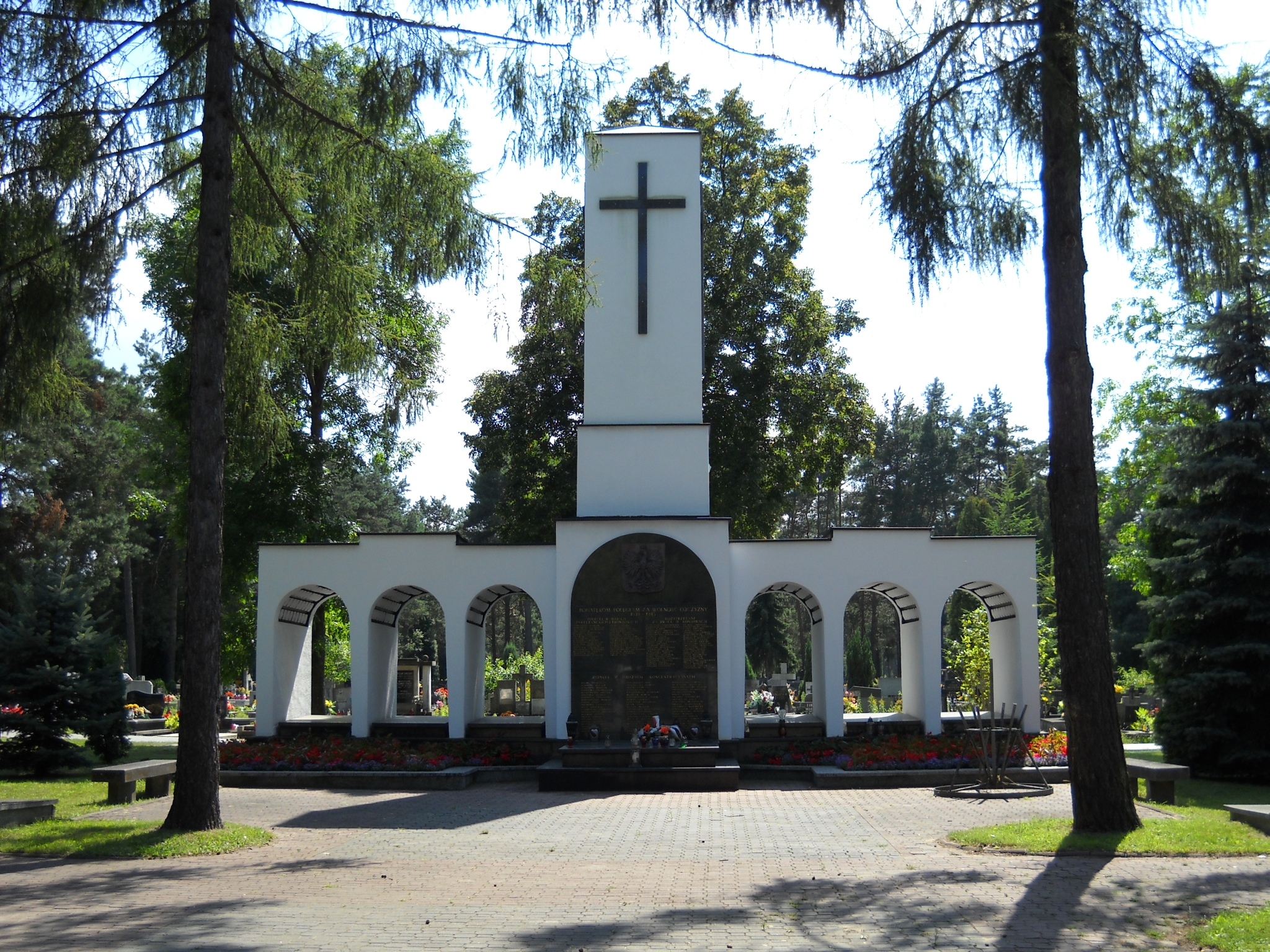
Monument to Those Fighting for Peace at the Stalowa Wola Municipal Cemetery

The Stalowa Wola Municipal Cemetery (Polish: Cmentarz Komunalny w Stalowej Woli) is a necropolis located in Stalowa Wola, Poland, situated at 59A Ofiar Katynia Street. (Note: English: Katyn Victims Street)

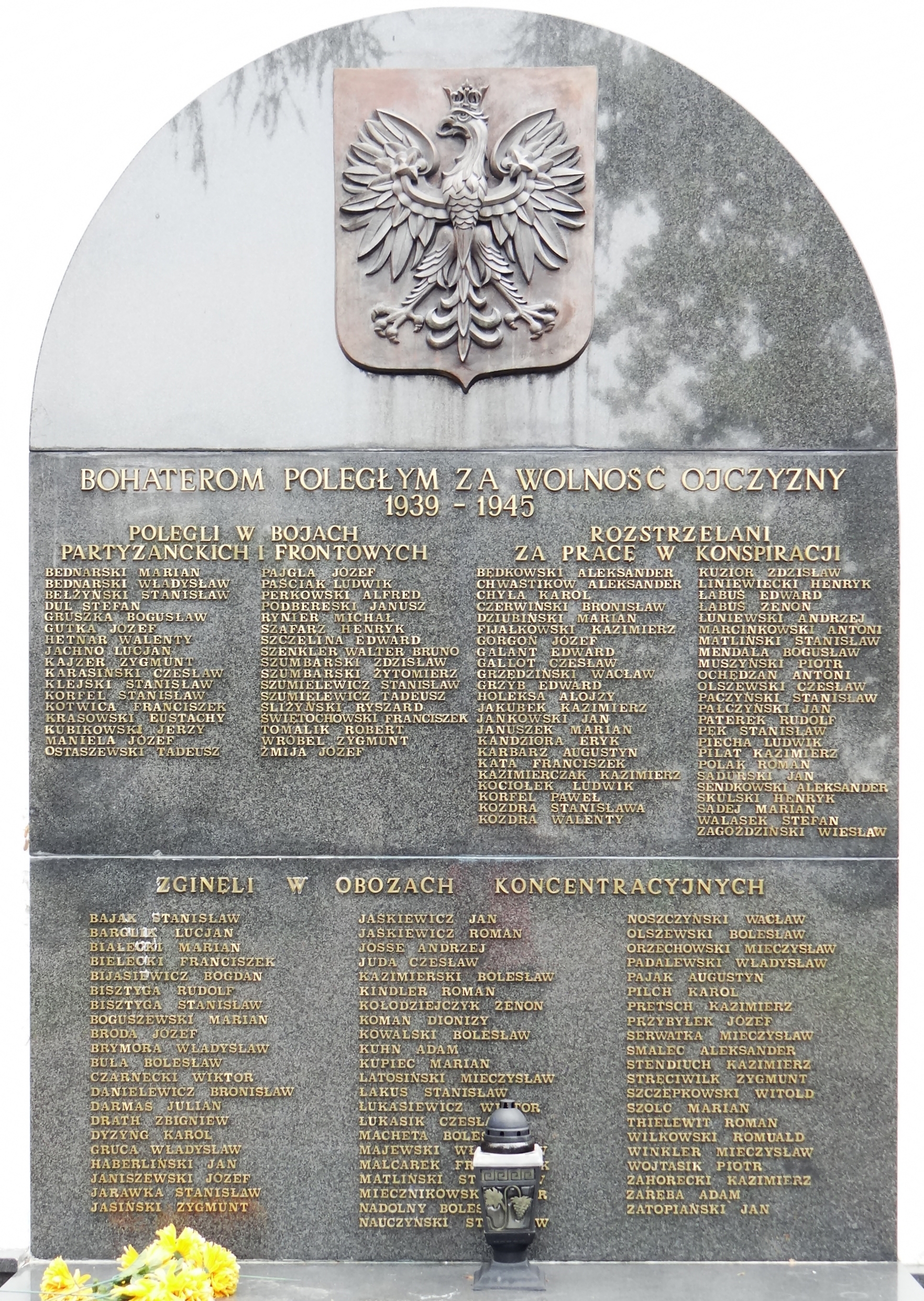
Plaque in the mausoleum on the cemetery grounds

== History ==
The cemetery was established in 1944 by decision of the occupying authorities, following the initiative of Fr. Józef Skoczyński, who sought to create a Catholic cemetery.

A chronicle entry on the matter states: “In 1944, Fr. Józef Skoczyński appealed to the German settlement administration, Siedlunsverwaltung, for the allocation of land to establish a cemetery in Stalowa Wola. The German authorities designated a plot for the cemetery outside the settlement in a sparse forest near the so-called Way of the Cross, precisely opposite the site where preparations had begun before the war for the construction of a large hospital serving the Central Industrial Region. In Fr. Skoczyński’s intention, the cemetery should have been ecclesiastical. The authorities decided that, since there was no parish with legal personality, the cemetery would be municipal, meaning it would be managed by the municipal authorities. After the war, Fr. Skoczyński attempted to persuade the Polish city authorities to transfer the cemetery to the parish, but he did not receive approval in the new political reality. Thus, the cemetery remains municipal to this day.”

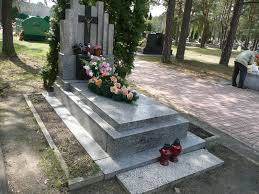
Grave of Fr. Józef Skoczyński at the Stalowa Wola Municipal Cemetery

In the 1970s, a funeral home with a chapel was built on the site, which was renovated between 2005 and 2006. The cemetery grounds also include a mausoleum for soldiers and partisans who died during World War II.

At the beginning of the 21st century, the cemetery had become the final resting place for several thousand individuals.

== Notable burials ==
- Wilhelm Gaj-Piotrowski (1924–2017) – Catholic priest, habilitated doctor, historian, ethnographer, and regionalist
- Władysław Liwak (1942–2017) – lawyer and politician, legal advisor, member of the Sejm of the X and I convocations
- Zdzisław Malicki (1928–2020) – metallurgist and politician, member of the Sejm of the VIII convocation
- Rudolf Patkoló (1922–1992) – footballer, representing Hungary and Poland
- Józef Skoczyński (1903–1967) – Roman Catholic clergyman, initiator of the establishment of the Stalowa Wola Municipal Cemetery
- Zbigniew Tokarczyk (1953–1984) – opposition activist during the Polish People's Republic
- Lucjan Trela (1942–2019) – boxer, boxing coach, Olympian from Mexico (1968)
- Jerzy Warchoł (1950–2012) – Catholic priest, prelate, canon

== See also ==
- Rozwadów Parish Cemetery
- Nisko Municipal Cemetery
- Nisko Jewish Cemetery
