= Rozwadów Parish Cemetery =

Cemetery in Rozwadów, Poland

- Cmentarz Parafialny w Rozwadowie
- Interactive map of Rozwadów Parish Cemetery

Details
- Established: 1785
- Location: Rozwadów, Stalowa Wola
- Country: Poland
- Coordinates: 50°35′30″N 22°02′55″E
- Type: Denominational
- Owned by: Parish of Our Lady of the Scapular
- Size: 2.8 ha (6.9 acres)
- No. of graves: Historic site, several notable monuments
- Website: Unofficial website

Rozwadów Parish Cemetery (Polish: Cmentarz Parafialny w Rozwadowie) is a historic cemetery established in 1785 in the southern part of the town of Rozwadów, by the then parish priest, Father Bernard Birkenmajer, on a section of the hill known as Góra Kokosza (now the northern district of Stalowa Wola). It belongs to the Parish of Our Lady of the Scapular. It was the largest cemetery in the region at the time of its establishment and is the oldest burial site for several generations of the deceased from the area, older than notable cemeteries such as Powązki in Warsaw, Lychakiv in Lviv, or Rakowicki in Kraków. It is now situated in the heart of Stalowa Wola.

The cemetery is located near the historic 18th-century Capuchin Monastery on Klasztorna Street, as well as the war cemetery from 1914. The main entrance features a neo-Gothic gate from 1923, and the grounds include 19th-century gravestones. The oldest grave, that of Józefa Krupecka, dates back to 1847. There is also an obelisk commemorating the January Uprising insurgents from 1863.

Among the many graves, several historic monuments can be found, including: on the northwest side, under a historic oak tree designated as a natural monument, Section F: a monument commemorating the 500th anniversary of the Battle of Grunwald 1410 – 1910; or on the southern side by Rozwadowska Street: a monument - mass grave of those murdered in 1943; as well as numerous graves of known and unknown national heroes from various historical events.

The cemetery covers an area of approximately 2.8 ha (6.9 acres).

== Historical monuments ==
- Monument for the 500th anniversary of the Battle of Grunwald from 1910
- Monument to the January Uprising insurgents from 1863
- Monument-mass grave of those murdered in 1943

== Notable burials ==
- Witold Habdank Kossowski (1894–1954) – Polish educator and poet, the first principal of the high school in Stalowa Wola
- Hieronim Ryba (1850–1927) – Polish Capuchin friar, church builder, priest, and confessor.

== See also ==
- Stalowa Wola Municipal Cemetery
- Nisko Municipal Cemetery

== Bibliography ==
- Marek Ziemba (ed.), Rozwadów. Sketches from the History of the Town, Literary Association "Witryna", Stalowa Wola 2004, pp. 112.
- Internet Encyclopedia of Stalowa Wola
