= Lucjan Trela =

Polish boxer (1942–2019)

Personal information
- Nationality: Polish
- Born: 25 June 1942 Turbia, Poland
- Died: 12 February 2019 (aged 76) Stalowa Wola, Poland

Sport
- Sport: Boxing

Lucjan Trela (25 June 1942 – 12 February 2019) was a Polish boxer associated with the Stal Stalowa Wola's boxing section. He competed in the men's heavyweight event at the 1968 Summer Olympics. At the 1968 Summer Olympics, he competed against George Foreman in his first Olympic bout.

== Professional career ==
Trela's sporting journey began with football—he played as a junior for a team in Turbia before moving to Stal Stalowa Wola, where he played as a center-back. He started his boxing career in the club's boxing section, with Ludwik Algierd as his coach. Despite having unconventional physical attributes for a heavyweight—standing 172 cm tall and weighing 86 kg—he began his official boxing career in 1959. The following year, as a boxer for Stal, he won the title of Polish Junior Champion. During his military service from 1962 to 1964, he represented the Bieszczady Rzeszów club.

He competed twice in the European Championships: in Rome in 1967 and in Belgrade in 1973. In Italy, he defeated Welshman Dennis Avoth in the eliminations but lost 0:5 to the eventual champion Mario Baruzzi in the quarterfinals. In Yugoslavia, after defeating Dutchman Hennie Toonen 5–0, he was also defeated 0–5 by German Peter Hussing in the quarterfinals.

In 1968, he participated in the 1968 Summer Olympics in Mexico City. In the first round (Round of 16), he faced George Foreman, who was 20 cm taller and later became both an Olympic and professional world champion. Trela lost by judges' decision 1–4 (two judges scored 60–58 and 60–57 for Foreman, one for Trela 60–59, and two more judges scored the bout 59–58 for Foreman). The decision was booed by Mexican fans. This was the only bout in that tournament that Foreman did not win by knockout. Trela was also slated to compete in the 1972 Summer Olympics but was removed from the team just four days before departure.

Trela won the Polish Championship in his weight category five times (1966, 1967, 1968, 1970, and 1971). He was also a silver medalist (1973) and a four-time bronze medalist at the Polish Championships (1962, 1965, 1974, and 1975). Between 1966 and 1974, he represented Poland in sixteen international bouts, winning eleven and losing five. Over his entire career, he fought 275 bouts, winning 220, drawing 11, and losing 44. He was renowned for his fighting spirit, speed, and endurance.

== Retirement ==
After retiring from boxing, he became a coach in Stalowa Wola. In addition to his boxing career, he worked in the tool shop at Stalowa Wola Steelworks, served as a football team manager for Stal Stalowa Wola, and worked in the United States as a locksmith and a doorman at a restaurant. Upon returning to Stalowa Wola, he co-founded the Feniks boxing school, from which he was dismissed in January 2013. He was married to Anna and had two sons, Grzegorz and Marek.

== Death ==
In the last period of his life, living in poverty, he suffered from heart arrhythmia, hypertension, diabetes, and peripheral artery disease. In December 2018, shortly before Christmas, he was admitted to a hospital in Stalowa Wola, where he died on 12 February 2019 at the age of 76. He was buried three days later in the Stalowa Wola Municipal Cemetery (Section Z, Row E, Grave 44).
