= Turbia =

- Village
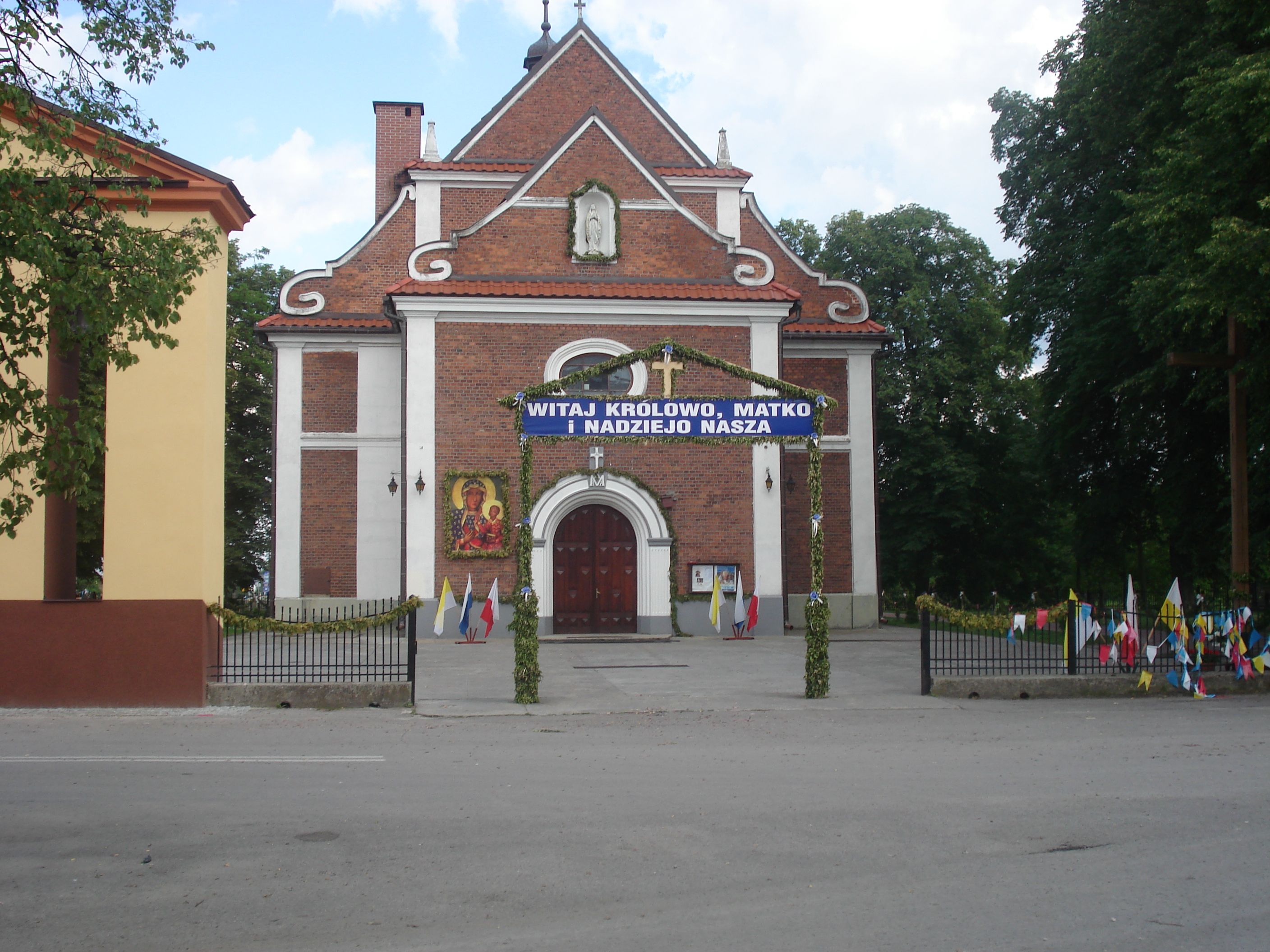
- Church of St Leonard

- Location within Poland
- Coordinates: 50°37′N 22°0′E
- Country: Poland
- Voivodeship: Subcarpathian
- County: Stalowa Wola
- Gmina: Zaleszany

Turbia [ˈturbja] is a village in the administrative district of Gmina Zaleszany, within Stalowa Wola County, Subcarpathian Voivodeship, in south-eastern Poland.

In Turbia, the Olympian Lucjan Trela was born.
