= Ryan Bank =

American technology executive

- Born: Ryan Clayton Bank; April 27, 1981 (age 45); Lake Forest, Illinois, U.S.
- Education: Northwestern University (BPhil, Communication)
- Occupation: Technology executive
- Years active: 2005–present
- Known for: Founding the Geospatial Insurance Consortium; social‑media rescue analytics during the 2010 Haiti earthquake
- Title: Executive Advisor, Vexcel
- Board member of: Vexcel Group Board of Advisors; National Geospatial Advisory Committee
- Partner: Dr. Sandra Köhldorfer (engaged 2022)
- Children: 1

Ryan Clayton Bank (born April 27, 1981) is an American technology executive who applies aerial imagery and open‑source intelligence to risk management and disaster response. He is an executive advisor at Vexcel, sits on the company’s Board of Advisors, and founded the not‑for‑profit Geospatial Insurance Consortium.

== Early life and education ==
Bank grew up in Chicago’s northern suburbs and graduated from Deerfield High School. He earned a Bachelor of Philosophy in Communication from Northwestern University, graduating cum laude.

== Career ==
=== Social‑media rescue analytics ===
During the 2010 Haiti earthquake Bank, then a volunteer with the U.S. Coast Guard Auxiliary, built a platform that parsed SMS, Twitter and Facebook posts in real time. Within the first month it processed more than 18,000 distress messages, routing coordinates to military and NGO responders.

=== Vexcel Group ===
Bank joined Vexcel in 2016 and today serves as Global Managing Director. The company’s aerial‑imagery program operates more than 100 aircraft and publishes roughly 150,000 ultra‑high‑resolution images per day, covering the United States and 40‑plus countries.

=== Geospatial Insurance Consortium ===
Bank launched the Geospatial Insurance Consortium in 2017 with the National Insurance Crime Bureau and Vexcel to give insurers access to aerial imagery before and after disasters. Its first season captured 24,000 sq mi after Hurricanes Harvey, Irma and Maria, processing 100 TB of data within days. By 2024 the consortium had photographed 99% of U.S. properties, using imagery and AI to flag roof damage, vegetation hazards and undeclared structures.

=== Government and advisory roles ===
- National Geospatial Advisory Committee (NGAC) – Appointed to a three‑year term in December 2024.
- United Nations Office for Disaster Risk Reduction (UNDRR) – Private‑sector representative advocating aerial imaging and AI for disaster‑risk strategies.

=== Media production ===
==== A Private War (2001) ====
While a student, Bank produced A Private War, a documentary about Polish physician Eugeniusz Łazowski and his wartime “fake typhus” rescue.

== Recognition ==
- Risk & Insurance – Risk All Star (2018) for accelerating catastrophe imagery delivery to insurers and emergency managers.

== Personal life ==
Bank became engaged to Austrian psychotherapist and television personality Dr. Sandra Köhldorfer on 21 November 2022 during the finale of Hochzeit auf den ersten Blick, the German‑language Married at First Sight. Their daughter, Kaia Amelia, was born seven weeks prematurely on 15 January 2025.

== Selected filmography ==
- A Private War (2001) – Producer
