= Charzewice, Stalowa Wola =

Neighborhood in Stalowa Wola, Poland

Charzewice is a neighborhood in Stalowa Wola, Poland, near Rozwadów, located by the San River.

== Background ==
After the First Partition of Poland in 1772 and subsequent partitions, it was part of the Habsburg monarchy. During the Second Polish Republic, it was in Lwów Voivodeship. Between 1934 and 1939, it was part of the newly established collective municipality of Charzewice, where it formed a gromada. During World War II, it was part of the Charzewice municipality in Dębica County, within the Distrikt Krakau (General Government). From 1945 to 1972, it was the seat of the Charzewice gromada, and from 1973 to 1977, it was again the seat of the Charzewice municipality. Starting 1 June 1973, it was in the Tarnobrzeg Voivodeship, and on 1 September 1977, it was incorporated into Stalowa Wola following the abolition of the Charzewice municipality.

== History ==
Documents from 1614 mention the village of Charzewice as co-owned by W. Brandwicki, S. Charzewski, J. Komorowski, and A. Stroiński. The consolidation of the estate began in the mid-17th century by the Piasecki family and continued by Gabriel Rozwadowski (married to Elżbieta from the Piasecki family). For over 200 years, from the first half of the 18th century until the end of World War II, Charzewice was the family estate of the Lubomirski princes (Rzeszów-Rozwadów branch). The first owner of the Rozwadów-Charzewice estate in 1723 was Jerzy Ignacy Lubomirski from Rzeszów, who purchased the estate from the Rozwadowski family.

Franciszek Grzegorz Lubomirski moved the family seat from Rzeszów to Charzewice and, in 1786, built a two-story palace on the outskirts of Charzewice, initially serving as an administrative center.

During World War I, due to positional battles between Russian and Austrian forces along the San River, both the village and the Lubomirski estate were significantly damaged. The palace was burned, and the estate was looted by retreating Russian troops.

=== Operation "F" in 1943 ===
In October 1943, the commander of the Home Army’s Kedyw, General Emil August Fieldorf ordered Operation "F." The objective was to carry out a death sentence on the German administrator of the Lubomirski estate, Martin Fuldner, who had ordered the murder of the Horodyński family in Zbydniów. The sentence was carried out at the hunting lodge in Charzewice. Emil August Fieldorf assigned the operation to partisans from the Świętokrzyskie Partisan Group of Jan Piwnik "Ponur" accompanied by the surviving Horodyński brothers, Andrzej and Zbigniew, and supported by soldiers from the AK "Wilcze Łyko" station in Rozwadów and the sabotage group NOW led by Henryk Paterek "Lew." A German Luftwaffe captain's uniform, previously captured during an operation in Rozwadów, was used in the mission.

=== Nationalization and Post-war Period ===
After 1945, the communist authorities of the Polish People's Republic nationalized the Lubomirski estate. Until the early 1990s, there was a State Agricultural Farm and a gardening school operating in the manor house on the park's grounds. In the post-war period, the former palace housed the Municipal Private General Education Gymnasium, later converted into a State General Education School. The building was subsequently used by the State Pedagogical High School and later a primary school in Charzewice. During this period, the palace, farm buildings, and the estate suffered significant deterioration.
