= Hotel Hutnik =

Coordinates: 50°33′58″N 22°04′14″E

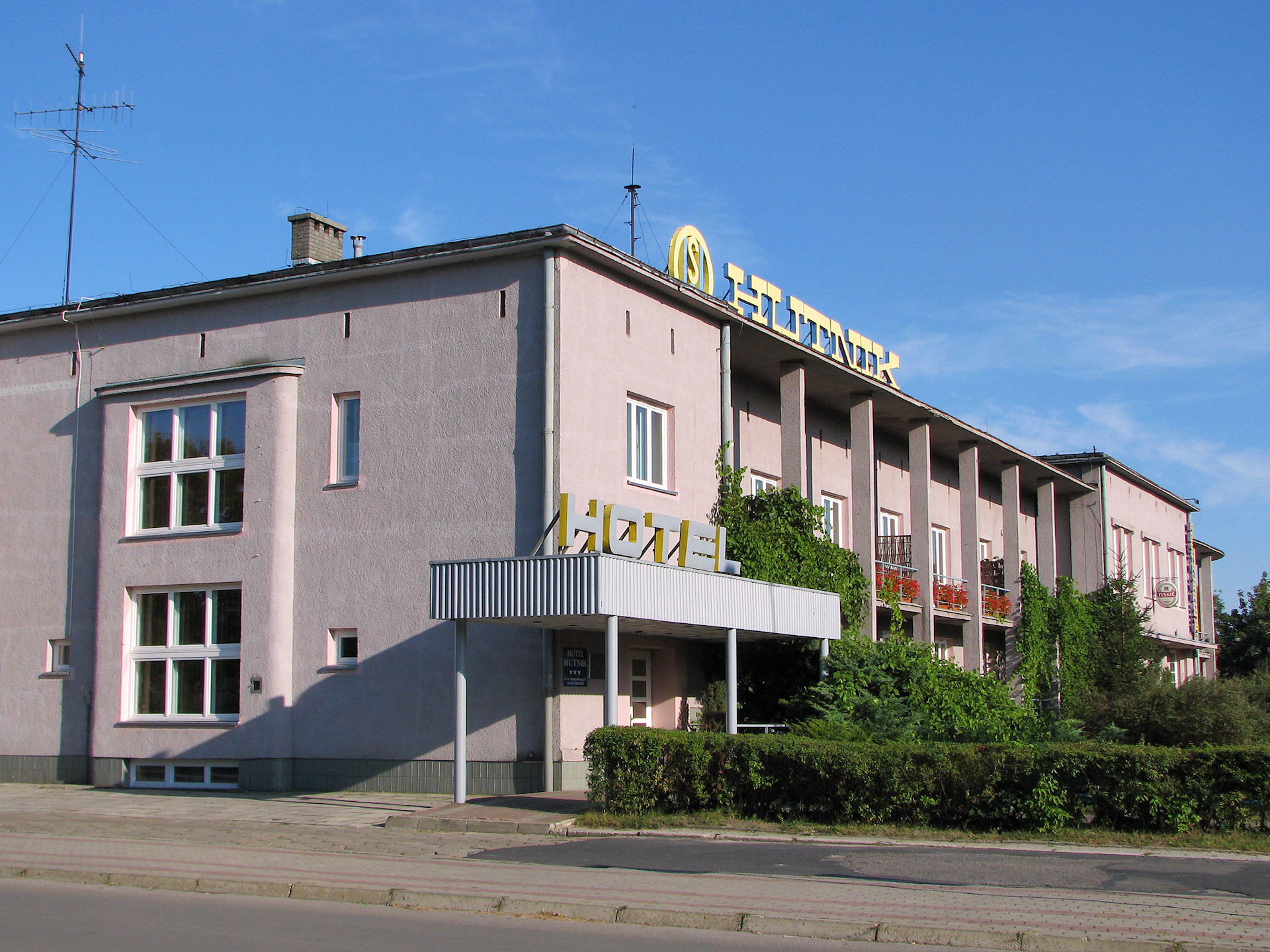
- Interactive map of the Hotel Hutnik area

General information
- Type: Hotel
- Architectural style: Art Deco
- Location: ul. ks. Prymasa Wyszyńskiego 12, Stalowa Wola, Poland
- Construction started: 1938
- Completed: 1948
- Opened: 1948
- Owner: Stalowa Wola municipality (since 2025)

Technical details
- Floor count: 2
- Floor area: 2121 m²

Design and construction
- Architect: (likely) Jan Bitny-Szlachta

The Hotel Hutnik is the oldest hotel in Stalowa Wola, Poland. It is located in the southern part of the city at 12 Księdza Prymasa Wyszyńskiego Street. It is considered one of the more interesting examples of the Art Deco style in Poland, which was popularized during the interwar period. The building is listed in the register of historic monuments of the Podkarpackie Voivodeship.

== History ==
The construction of the "Dom Gościnny Zakładów Południowych" (Guest House of the Southern Works) is closely tied to the development of the industrial housing estate of Zakłady Południowe. The city was built in a modernist style, with some administrative buildings designed in the representative Art Deco style. The facility, serving as both a club and a hotel with a restaurant, was intended to fulfill a representative role for the factory and the city.

The building was constructed in its raw state between 1938 and 1939 in what was then the executive district. However, the outbreak of World War II halted further construction. During the war, the structure was used as a warehouse. After the end of hostilities, construction was completed in 1948 according to preserved pre-war plans. The building retained its original purpose and was named the "Hutnik" Guest House.

The "Hutnik" was owned by Huta Stalowa Wola until 2006, when the building was purchased by the Regional Museum.

In 2025, the hotel was transferred to the Stalowa Wola municipality, which announced its intention to sell the property to another entity.

== Design ==
The Art Deco design was likely the work of architect Jan Bitny-Szlachta, who also designed the Main Directorate Building of Huta Stalowa Wola. The plan envisioned a two-story structure with an irregular shape. Positioned as the eastern terminus of the settlement at the time, it was aligned along a south–north axis with its main façade facing west. The building's façade was harmonized with the architectural style of the villas in the so-called Executive Housing Estate, creating a cohesive ensemble.

The roof extends slightly forward and is supported by rectangular loggias. The elegant appearance of the representative façade is subtly contrasted by the protruding section of the main entrance, which features a concave, slightly rounded shape. Particularly striking is the southern side of the building, where a dramatic 90-degree curved wall adds an expressive character to the structure.

Art Deco elements in the building's design include loggias on the main façade, in the lobby, and on the first floor, as well as angular pilasters along the walls and the hotel staircase inside. The interior was designed not only for hotel rooms but also to accommodate an exclusive club and restaurant[8]. The modern aesthetic is further emphasized by large glass surfaces in the curved corner of the ballroom. The total area of the building is approximately 2,121 m^{2}.
