= Stalowa Wola railway station =

Railway station in Stalowa Wola, Poland

Coordinates: 50.5624°N 22.0610°E

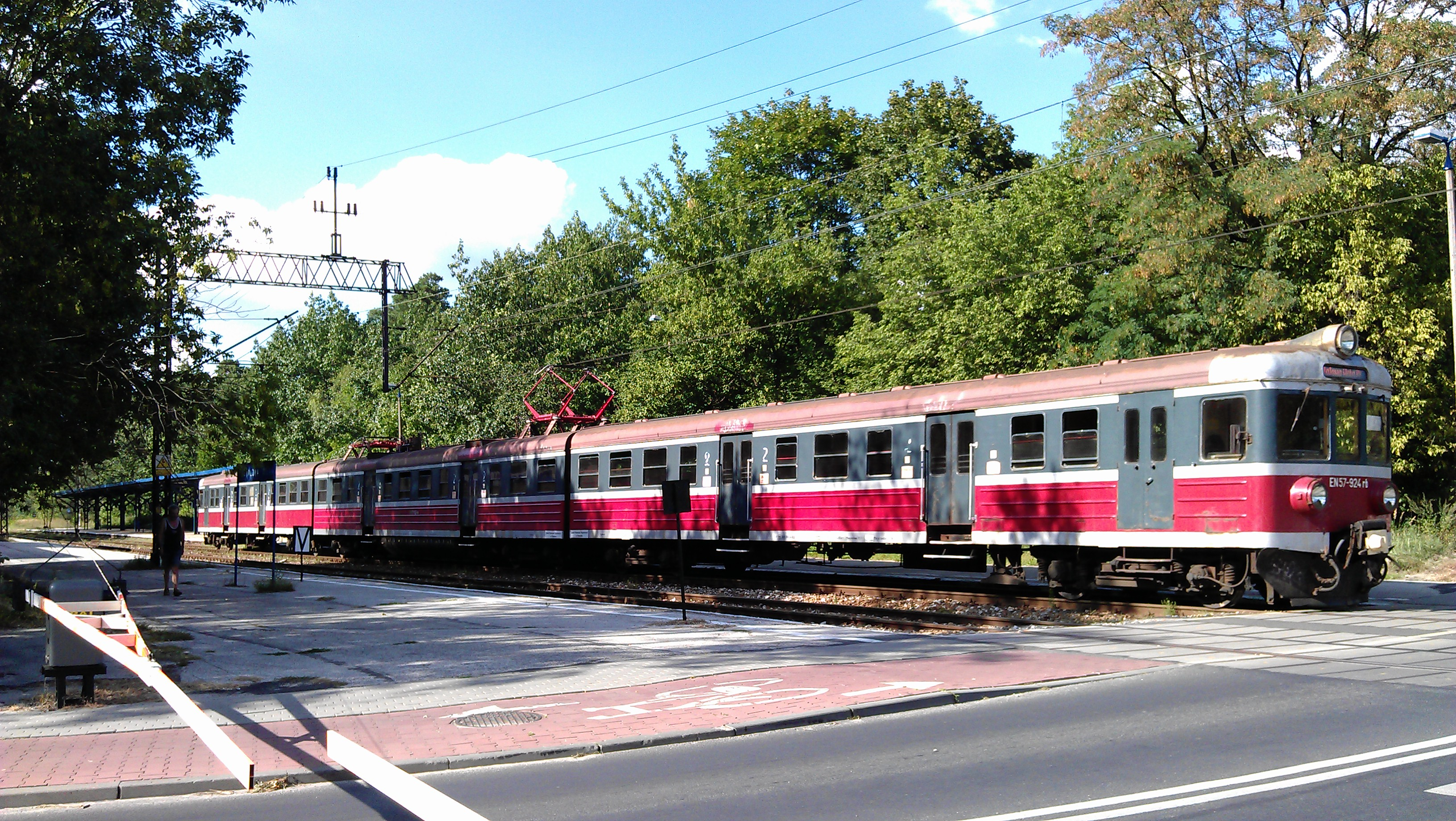
Stalowa Wola railway station

Stalowa Wola is a railway station in Stalowa Wola, Subcarpathian Voivodeship, Poland. Until recently, Twoje Linie Kolejowe trains stopped here, today only Regio trains. At the station, there is a closed station building, built in the early 1950s, in poor condition, with ticket offices open until 2012.

In 2017, the station served 100–149 passengers a day.

== See also ==
- Stalowa Wola Rozwadów railway station
- Stalowa Wola Centrum railway station
- Stalowa Wola Południe railway station
