= Lucjusz Nadbereżny =

Polish politician (born 1985)

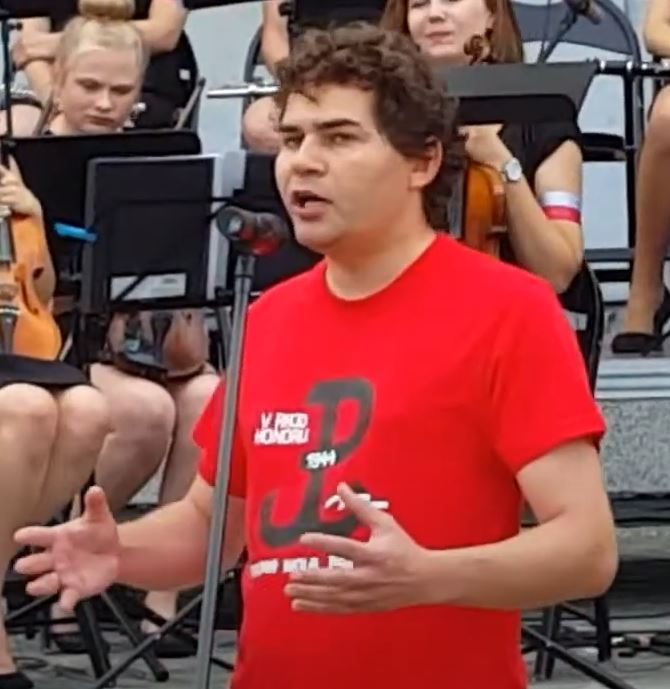

Mayor of Stalowa Wola
- Incumbent
- Assumed office 28 November 2014
- Preceded by: Andrzej Szlęzak

Personal details
- Born: 21 May 1985 (age 40) Stalowa Wola, Poland
- Party: Law and Justice

Lucjusz Nadbereżny (born 21 May 1985) is a Polish politician of the Law and Justice party, serving as mayor of Stalowa Wola. He was first elected in the 2014 local elections, and was re-elected in 2018 and 2024. He previously served as city councillor from 2006 to 2014. Since 2015, he has been a member of the National Development Council advising the president of Poland.
