= Stalowa Wola Rozwadów railway station =

Railway station in Rozwadów, Poland

Coordinates: 50°35′29″N 22°02′32″E

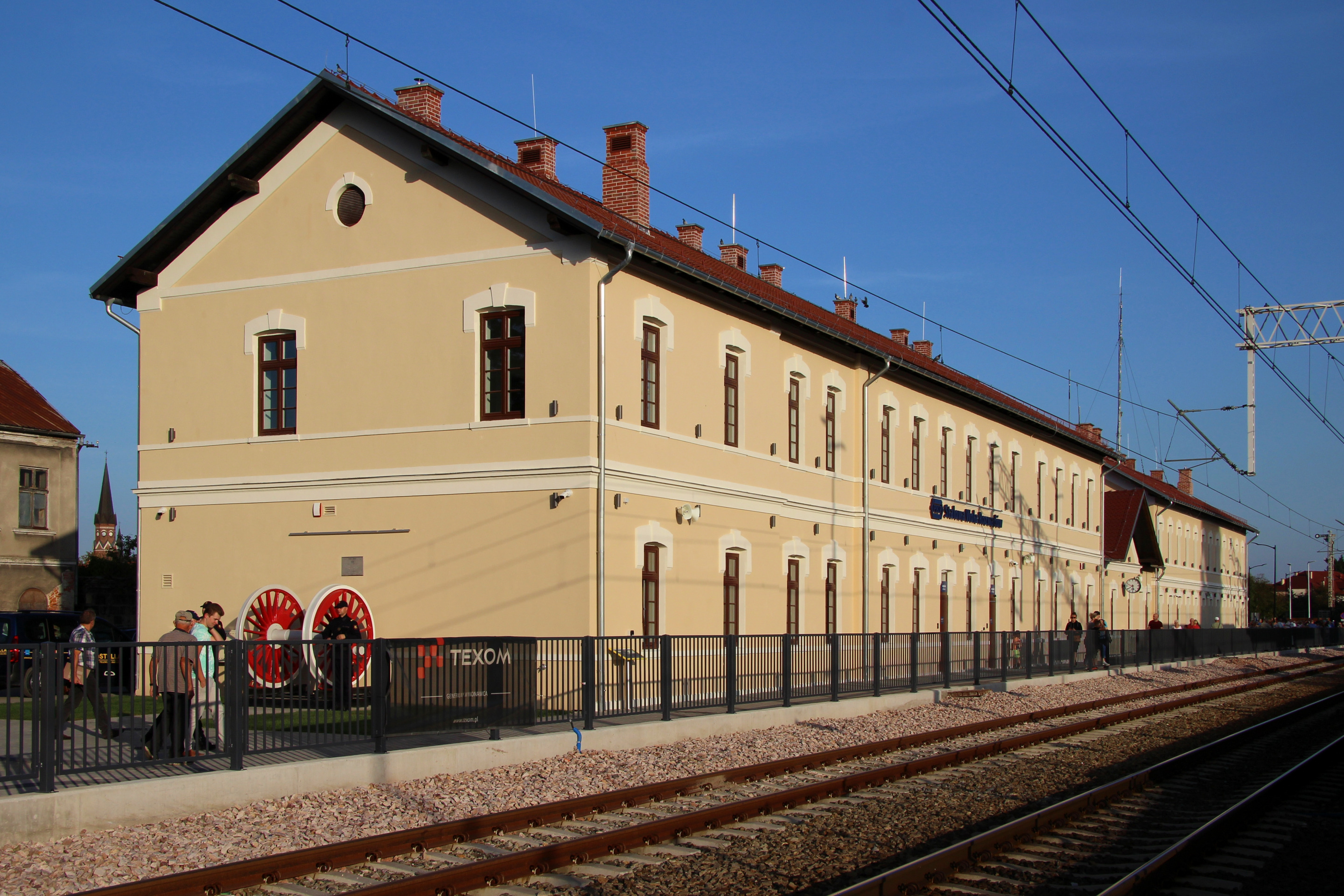
Stalowa Wola Rozwadów railway station

Stalowa Wola-Rozwadów is a rail junction of the Polish State Railways, located in Rozwadów, one of districts of southern Polish city of Stalowa Wola. The station was built in 1887, along the strategic line from Przeworsk to Sobów near Sandomierz, which followed along the northern border of former Austrian province of Galicia. Currently, trains leave it in three directions - south (towards Przeworsk), west (towards Sandomierz) and north (towards Lublin). The station has three platforms.

== See also ==
- Stalowa Wola railway station
