= Nisko Municipal Cemetery =

Coordinates: 50°30′46″N 22°07′04″E

Nisko Municipal Cemetery (Polish: Cmentarz Komunalny w Nisku) is a necropolis located in Barce, Nisko at Bartosz Głowacki Street, it is the only active cemetery in the town.

The cemetery is managed by the Municipality and Town of Nisko.

== Notable burials ==
Among the distinguished and notable individuals buried at the cemetery, the cemetery administration lists: Michał Bajak (lawyer), Fr. Józef Balawejder, Józef Baran, Stanisław Bednarz, Fr. Wincenty Boczara, Stanisław Chruściel, Zofia Czabaj, Franciszek Janczura (high school teacher), Władysław Karpia, Jan Łabuda, Władysław Ostrowski, Józef Płachciński, Stanisław Puchalski, Maria Ratajczak (teacher), Paweł Suchojad, Franciszek Sycz (September Campaign soldier), Władysław Węgliński, Fr. Marian Wolicki, and Fr. Józef Wróblewski.

== See also ==
- Stalowa Wola Municipal Cemetery
- Nisko Jewish Cemetery
