= Rozwadów =

Suburb of Stalowa Wola, Poland

Coordinates: 50°35′28″N 22°02′30″E

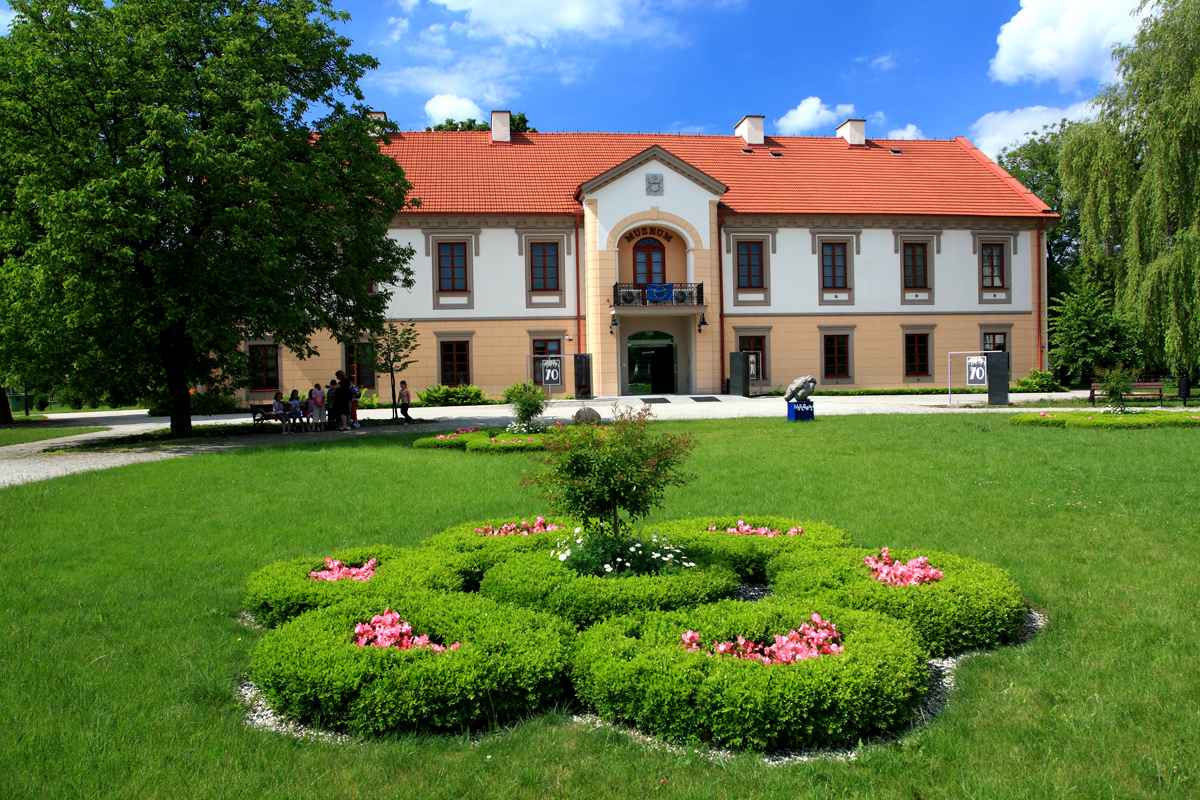
Regional museum

Rozwadów (Yiddish: ראָזוועדאָוו, romanized: Rozvedov) is a suburb of Stalowa Wola, Poland. Founded as a town in 1690, it was incorporated into Stalowa Wola in 1973. The Rozwadów suburb of Stalowa Wola included a thriving Jewish shtetl prior to World War II, closely associated with the Jewish communities of Tarnobrzeg and other nearby shtetls including Ulanów, Mielec, and Dzików. These communities, infused with vitality before 1939, were utterly destroyed by the Germans during the Holocaust.

During the German occupation of Poland (1939-1945) two Polish doctors, Eugene Lazowski and Stanisław Matulewicz created a fake typhoid fever epidemic in Rozwadów: "the quarantined area that Lazowski and Matulewicz created became a haven for Polish Jews, who could hide in Rozwadów under the cover of the fake epidemic without fear of the Nazis discovering them. All told, the doctors saved an estimated 8,000 people from being killed or imprisoned during their three-year campaign with the help of a UTI-causing bacterium."

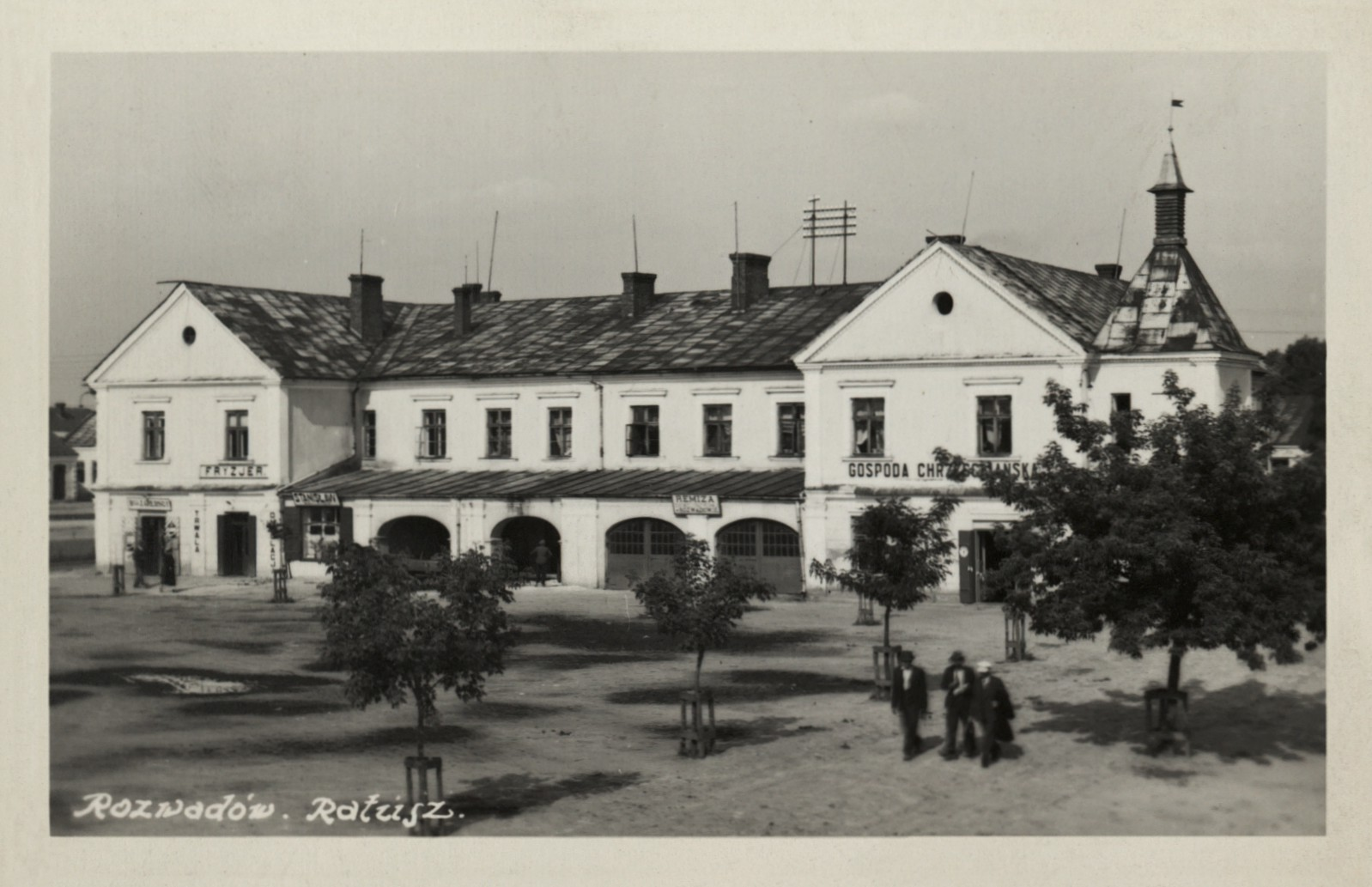
Town hall, 1910

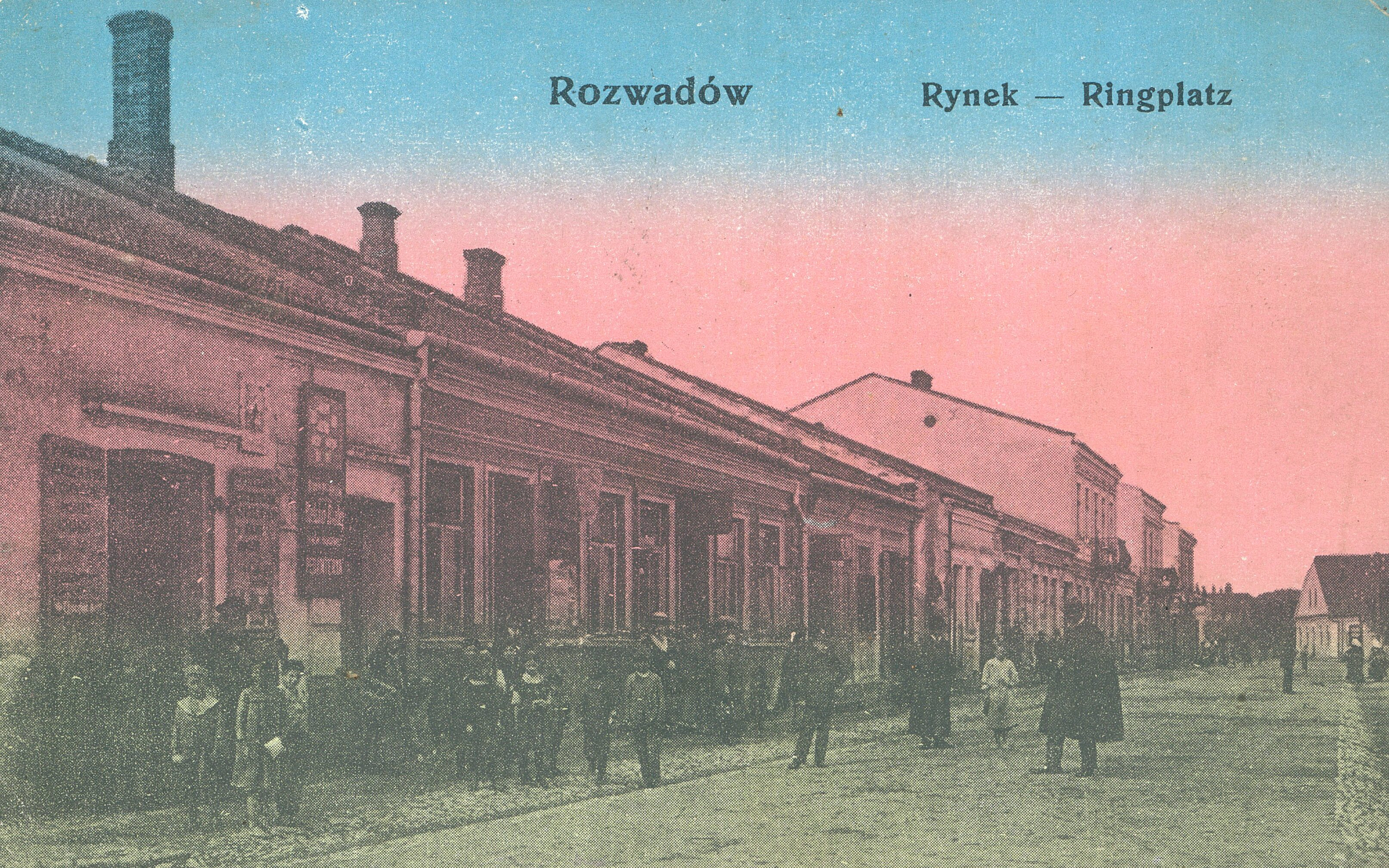
Market square, 1915

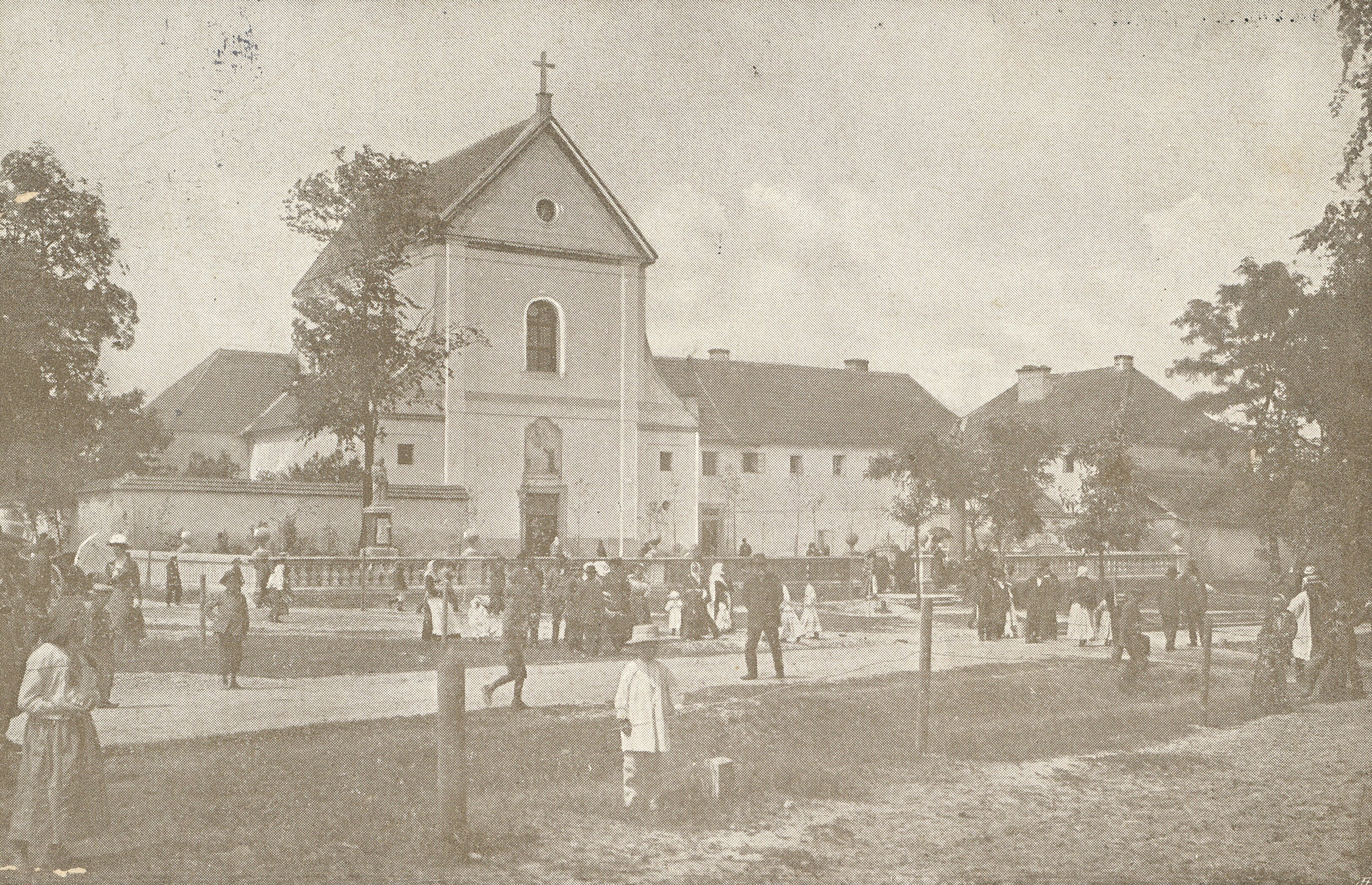
Capuchin Monastery, 1933

Rozwadów is a major rail junction, see Stalowa Wola-Rozwadów (PKP station). The Rozwadów Parish Cemetery is also located in this area

There exists a Memorial Book (Yizkor Book) for Rozwadow.

In Rozwadów, Josef Schwammberger murdered a rabbi on Yom Kippur 1942. This was a terrible crime which was a reason for his trial in 1991.
