= Stalowa Wola =

City in Subcarpathian Voivodeship, Poland

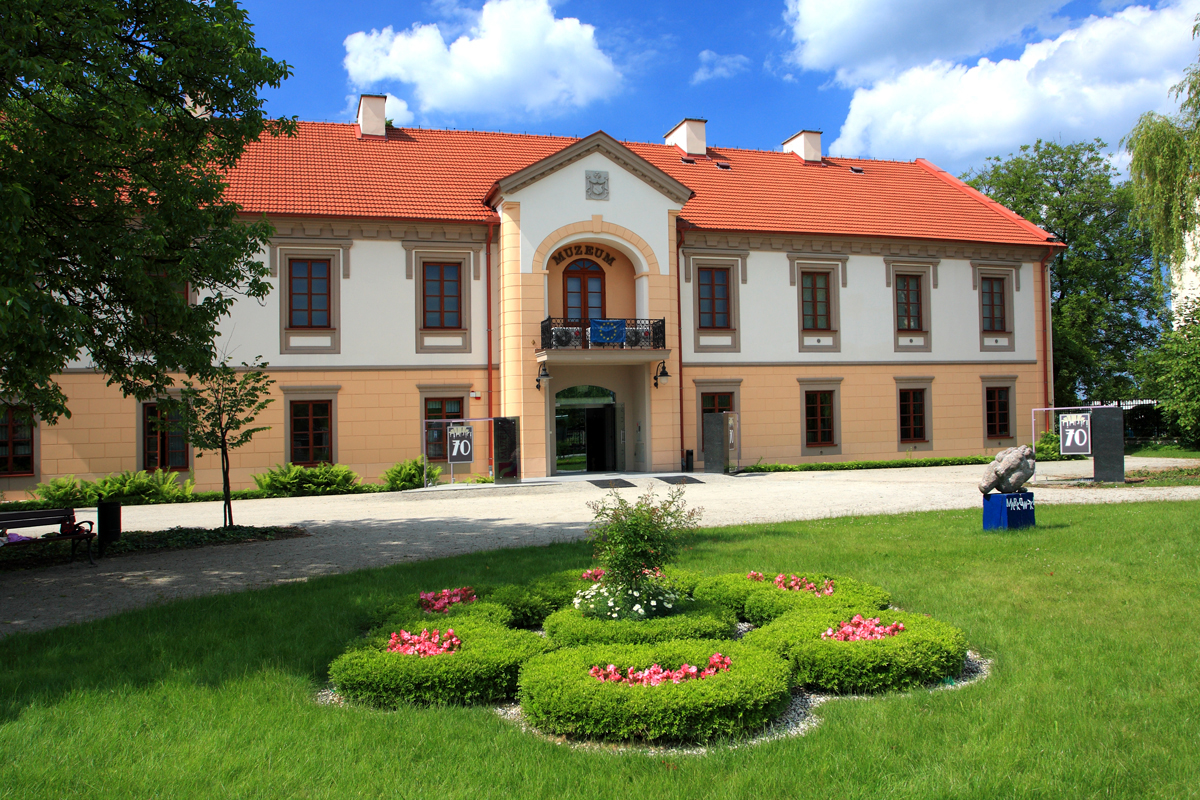
- Lubomirski Palace

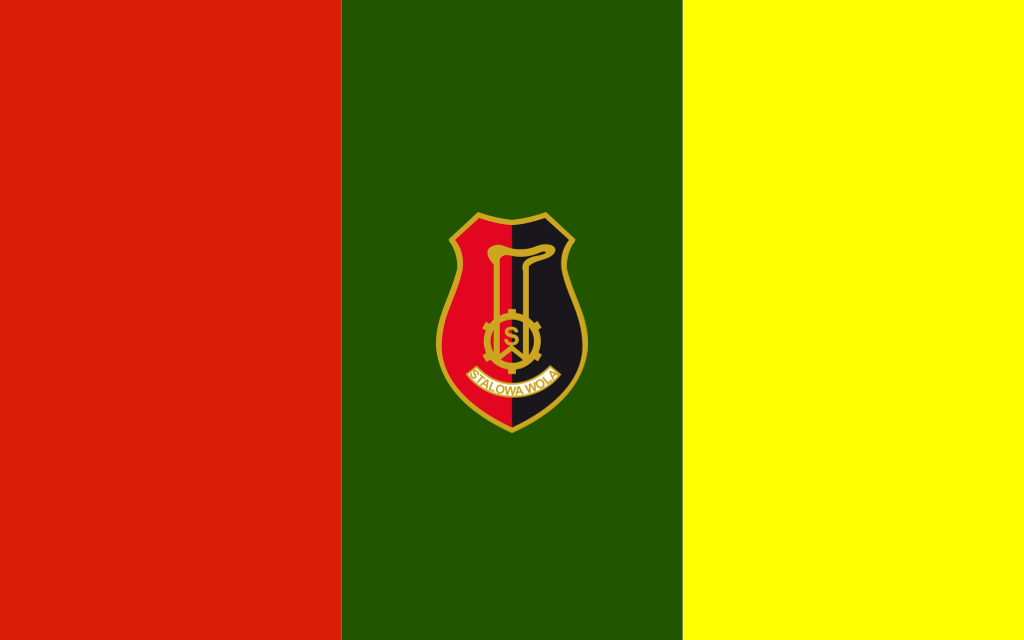
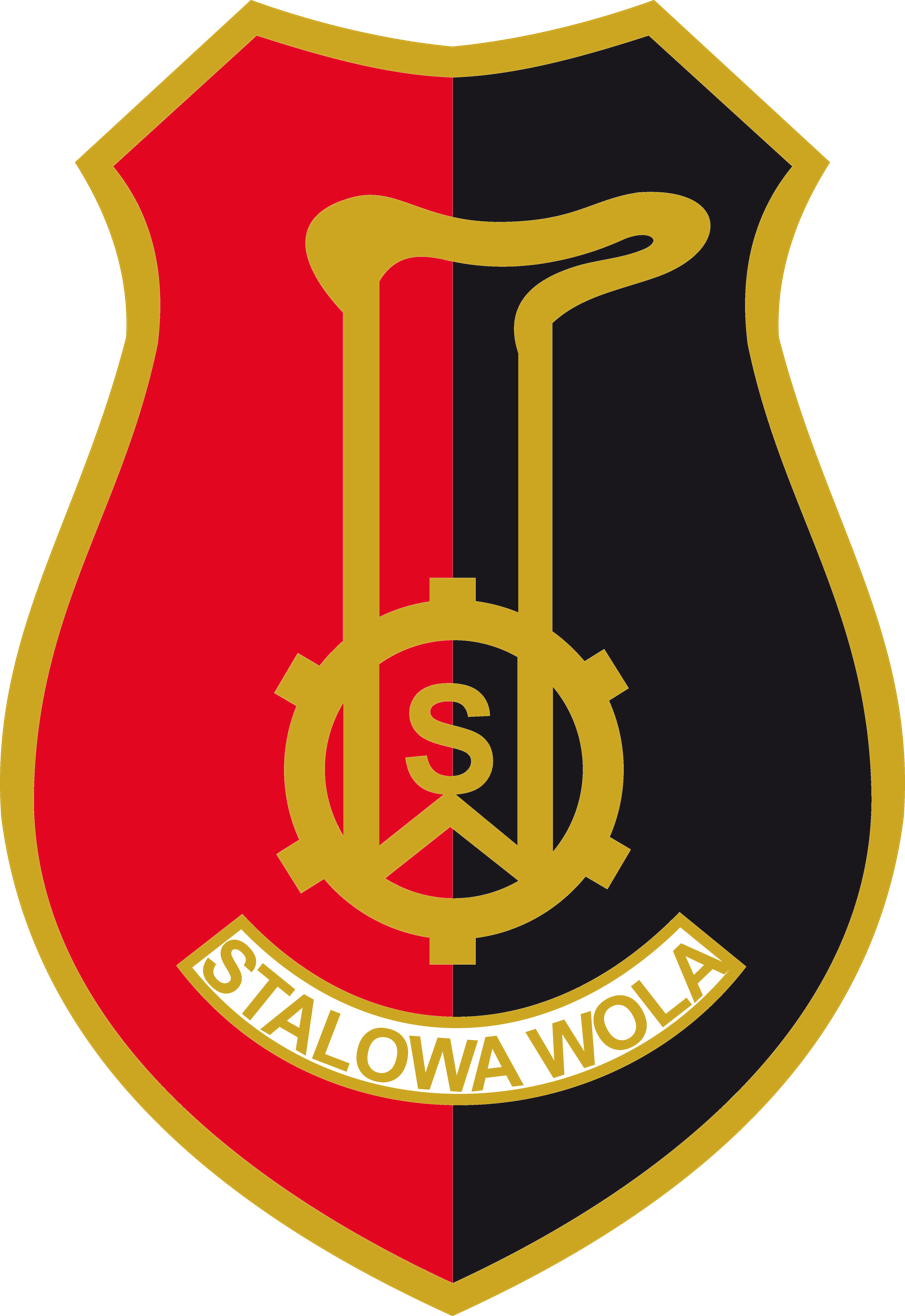
- Flag Coat of arms

- Location within Subcarpathian Voivodeship Location within Poland
- Coordinates: 50°34′04″N 22°03′35″E
- Country: Poland
- Voivodeship: Subcarpathian
- County: Stalowa Wola County
- Gmina: Stalowa Wola (urban gmina)
- Established: 1938
- City rights: 1945

Government
  - City Mayor: Lucjusz Nadbereżny (PiS)

Area
  - Total: 82.5 km^{2} (31.9 sq mi)

Population (31 December 2021)
  - Total: 58,545 ▼
  - Density: 710/km^{2} (1,840/sq mi)
- Time zone: UTC+1 (CET)
  - Summer (DST): UTC+2 (CEST)
- Postal Code: 37-450 to 37-464
- Area code: (+48) 15
- Car plates: RST
- Website: http://www.stalowawola.pl

Stalowa Wola ([staˈlɔva ˈvɔla]) is the largest city and capital of Stalowa Wola County with a population of 58,545 inhabitants, as of 31 December 2021. It is located in southeastern Poland in the Subcarpathian Voivodeship. The city lies in historic Lesser Poland near the confluence of the Vistula and the San rivers, and covers an area of 82.5 km^{2} (31.9 sq mi).

Stalowa Wola is one of the youngest cities of Poland. It was built from scratch in the late 1930s in the forests surrounding village of Pławo. The city was designed to be a settlement for workers of Huta Stalowa Wola (known in 1938 to 1939 as Zakłady Poludniowe or Southern Works), a plant built as part of the Central Industrial Region. The name "Stalowa Wola" translates to "Steel Will" in English, reflecting its origins and purpose as a city established to support the steel industry. Stalowa Wola is home to the sports club Stal Stalowa Wola.

== Location and name ==
Stalowa Wola is located in the lowlands of the Sandomierz Basin, near the San river. Even today sixty percent of the total area within its administrative borders (82 square kilometres (32 square miles)) consists of natural pine forests, remnants of once extensive and primeval Sandomierz Forest. The name of the town, Stalowa Wola, can be roughly translated into English as “steel will” and comes from a statement made by General Tadeusz Kasprzycki, Minister of Military Affairs of Poland in the late 1930s in which he declared that the new Polish industrial development plan of the Central Industrial Area symbolizes the steel will of the Polish nation to modernize itself.

== History ==
The area of today's Stalowa Wola belongs to historic Polish province of Lesser Poland. In the Kingdom of Poland, it was administratively located in the Sandomierz Voivodeship in the Lesser Poland Province. The city of Stalowa Wola was built on the site where the village of Pławo once stood, between the ancient towns of Nisko and Rozwadów. The first mentions of Pławo come from the first half of the 15th century. At the nearby village of Przyszów, there was a hunting lodge of King Władysław Jagiełło, built before 1358. In the late 15th century, Pławo was a royal village. In 1656, the area of Pławo was the site of a battle between Polish and Swedish armies. Here, in the confluence of the San and Vistula, Swedish troops of King Charles Gustav were surrounded by Stefan Czarniecki (see Swedish invasion of Poland). Following the Partitions of Poland, from 1772 to 1918, Pławo was part of the Austrian province of Galicia and remained an insignificant, privately owned village.

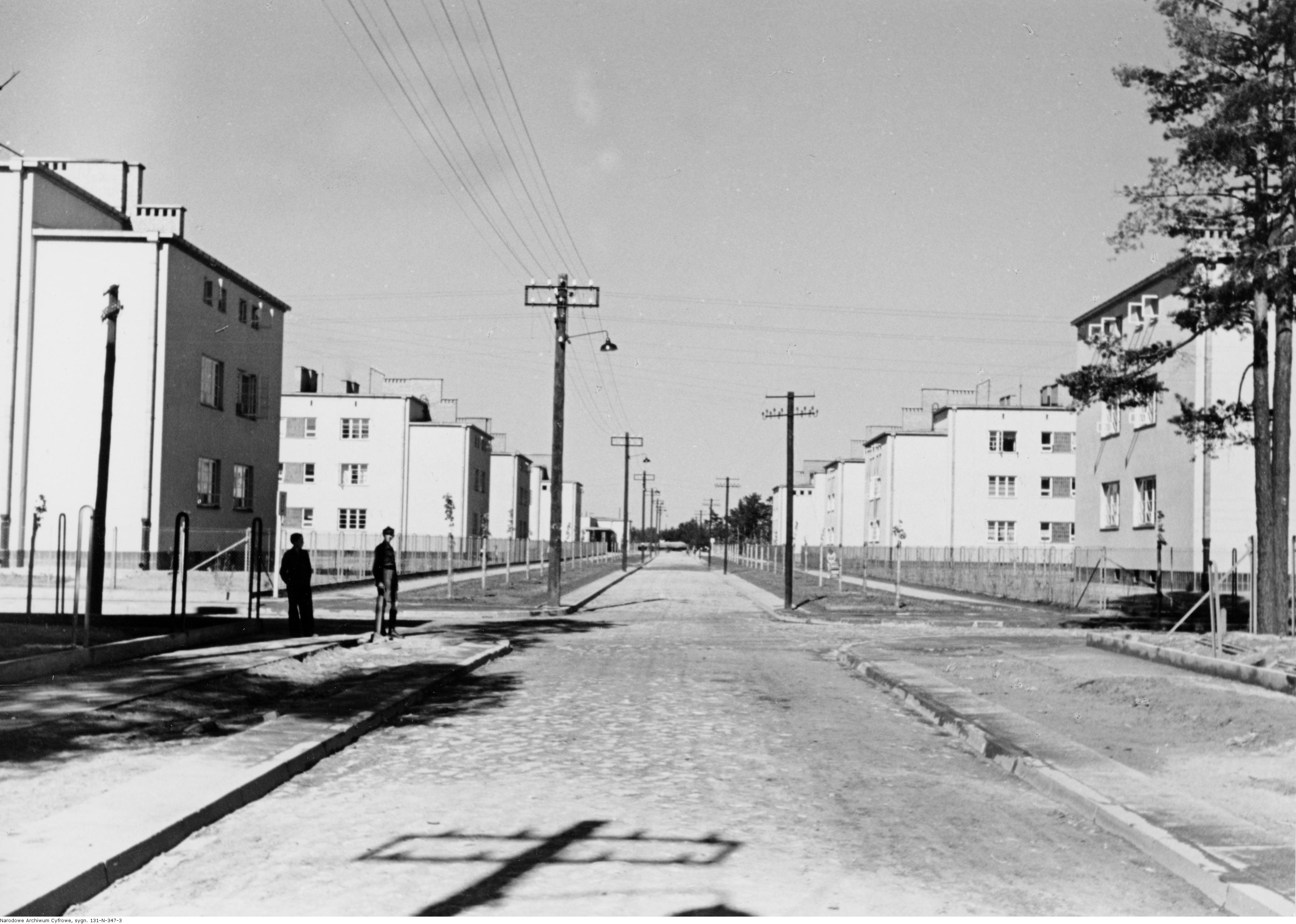
New housing in Stalowa Wola in the 1930s

In early 1937, the government of the Second Polish Republic accepted the project of the Central Industrial Area, which included the construction of a brand new steel mill, together with a settlement for the workers. Before the outbreak of World War II, some departments of the mill were operational and several blocks of flats were built. Construction of the Southern Works, as the mill was then called, was started in dense pine forests around Pławo in March 1937. Among other things, the plant manufactured artillery cannons.

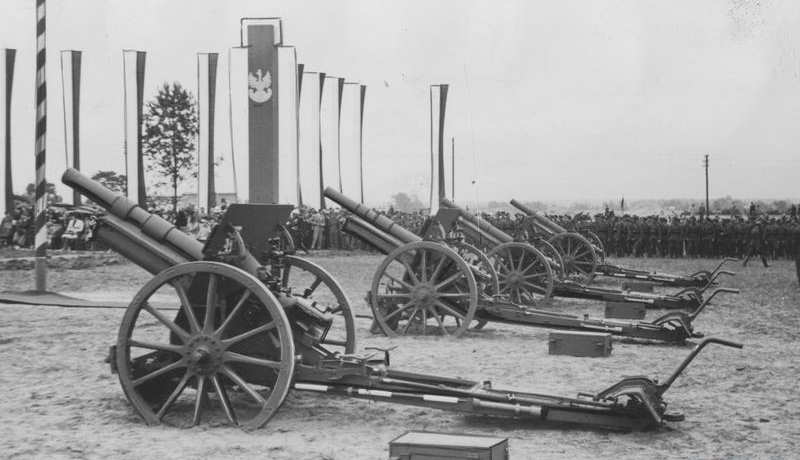
Delivery of howitzers to the Polish Army in 1939

Following the joint German-Soviet invasion of Poland, which started World War II in September 1939, the city was occupied by Nazi Germany. During the war, Stalowa Wola was one of the centres of the Home Army. Polish workers carried out acts of sabotage in the factories, and those at risk of arrest fled and joined partisan units in the nearby forests. The settlement was captured by the Red Army in August 1944.

On April 1, 1945, Stalowa Wola received its town charter. In 1948, the mill was renamed as Huta Stalowa Wola and in 1953, a separate urban county of Stalowa Wola was created. In 1973, the town of Rozwadów was annexed, followed in 1977 by the village of Charzewice. At its peak in the 1970s, the mill employed 35,000 people, with branches scattered across southern Poland, from Radomsko to Strzyżów. Apart from the mill, Stalowa Wola has a large power plant, opened Spring 1939. In 1988, the city was one of the centres of workers' protests (see 1988 Polish strikes). Currently, Stalowa Wola is the third-largest city of the voivodeship, with a population of 60,000.

=== Jews in Rozwadów ===
The Rozwadów suburb of Stalowa Wola was a thriving Jewish shtetl prior to World War II and was closely associated with Tarnobrzeg and other nearby shtetls including Ulanów, Mielec, Dzików etc. These communities, infused with vitality before 1939, were utterly destroyed during the Holocaust after having been affected by World War I only some 20 years earlier. Jews in Rozwadów were a religiously observant community, i.e. traditional or Orthodox in practice. The leading rabbi of Rozwadów, similar to other rabbis of the region, followed Hasidism practice and was of the Horowitz family. In New York, a Rozwadower Rebbe established a small synagogue on the Upper West Side, which continued for many decades after the war. There is a link to a yizkor book about Rozwadów which gives further notes on the Jewish life there. The Rozwadów synagogue was, until World War II, located on Attorney Street on the Lower East Side of Manhattan.

During World War II, Dr. Eugene Lazowski, a military doctor of the Polish underground Home Army, Armia Krajowa, created a fake epidemic of dangerous infectious disease, Epidemic Typhus in the town of Rozwadów (now a district of Stalowa Wola) and the surrounding villages and towns. He saved an estimated 8,000 Polish Jews from certain death in Nazi concentration camps during the Holocaust, performing his services in utmost secrecy under the threat of capital punishment.

Following the Holocaust, the remaining Jews were motivated to seek a new start in Palestine, thanks to Berihah's efforts. A community of former Rozwadów citizens had been established in New York City and continued its affinity long after World War II. Many former Rozwadów citizens of Jewish backgrounds moved to the fledgeling State of Israel.

== Heritage sites ==
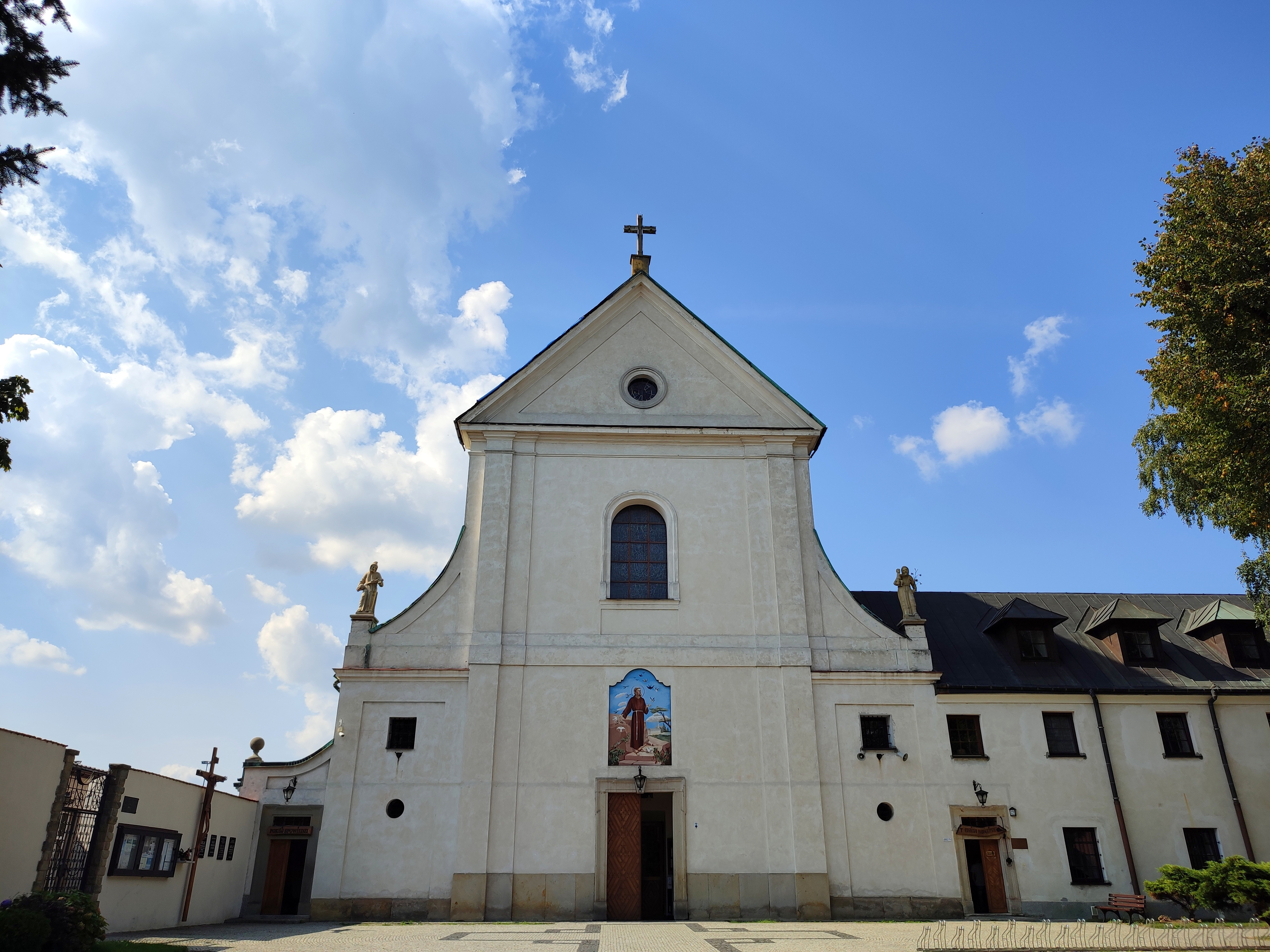
Annunciation Church

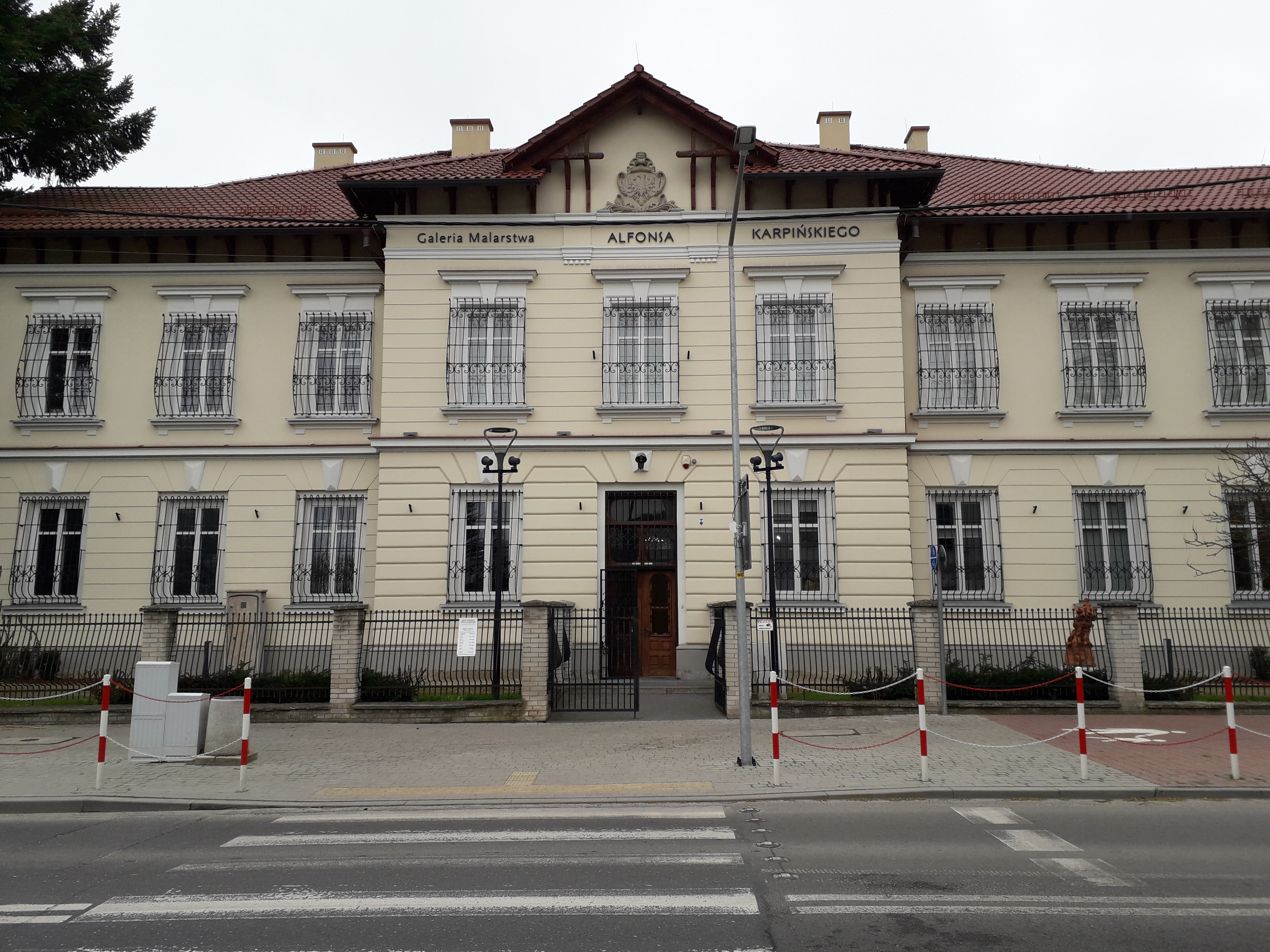
Alfons Karpinski Paintings Gallery

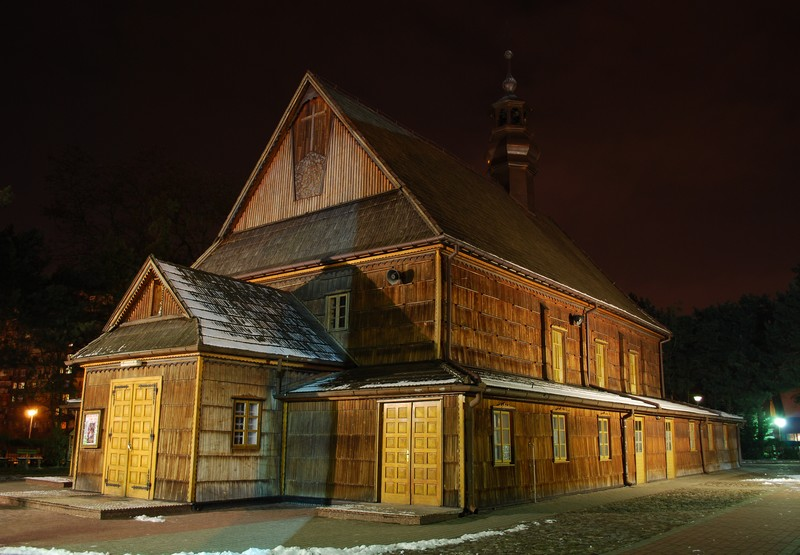
Old Church of Saint Florian

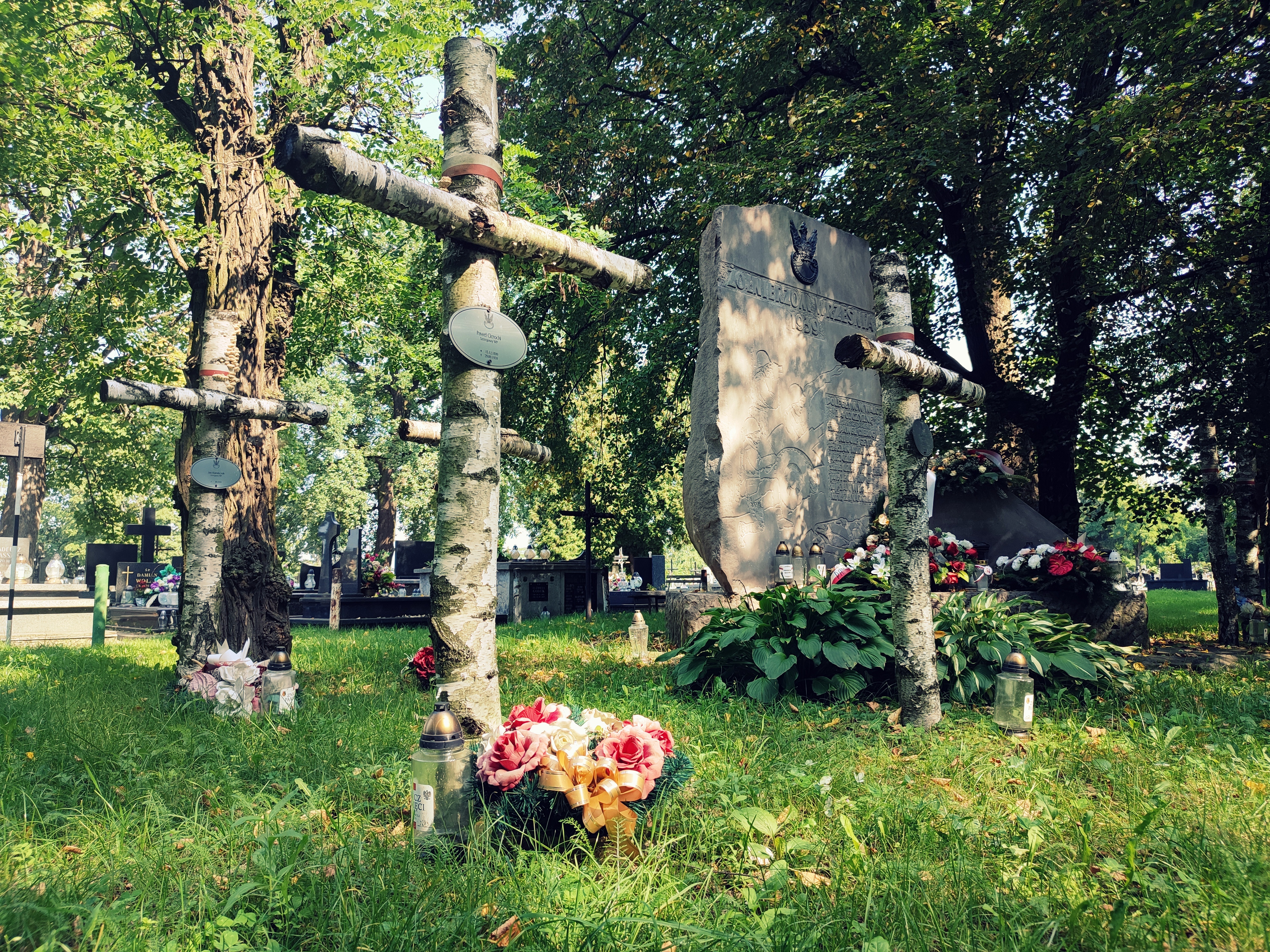
Rozwadów War Cemetery

Heritage sites in Stalowa Wola include, among others:

- Capuchin Fathers' Monastery Complex
- Parish Church of St. Florian and the wooden bell tower;
- Parish Church of Our Lady of the Scapular;
- Rozwadów Parish Cemetery;
- Rozwadów War Cemetery;
- Lubomirski Castle in Rozwadów (now the Regional Museum);
- Obelisk in Charzewice;
- Hotel Hutnik;
- Former courthouse building in Rozwadów, now a museum, at 12 Rozwadowska Street.

== Economy ==
Stalowa Wola is one of the leading highly developed industrial centers in the Subcarpathian province. More than 6,000 enterprises operate here - nationally and internationally recognized companies. The dominant industries are concentrated around machinery, armaments, aluminum, metal, foundry, steel, wood, construction. Investors from all over the world, including Korea, China, USA, Scandinavia, Germany, have located their capital here.

Stalowa Wola is a nationally important armament center for the Polish army. Based on the military profile of design, production and sales, Huta Stalowa Wola S.A. offers armament equipment. The Stalowa Wola Power Plant, part of the Tauron Group, also plays a leading role in the city's economic life.

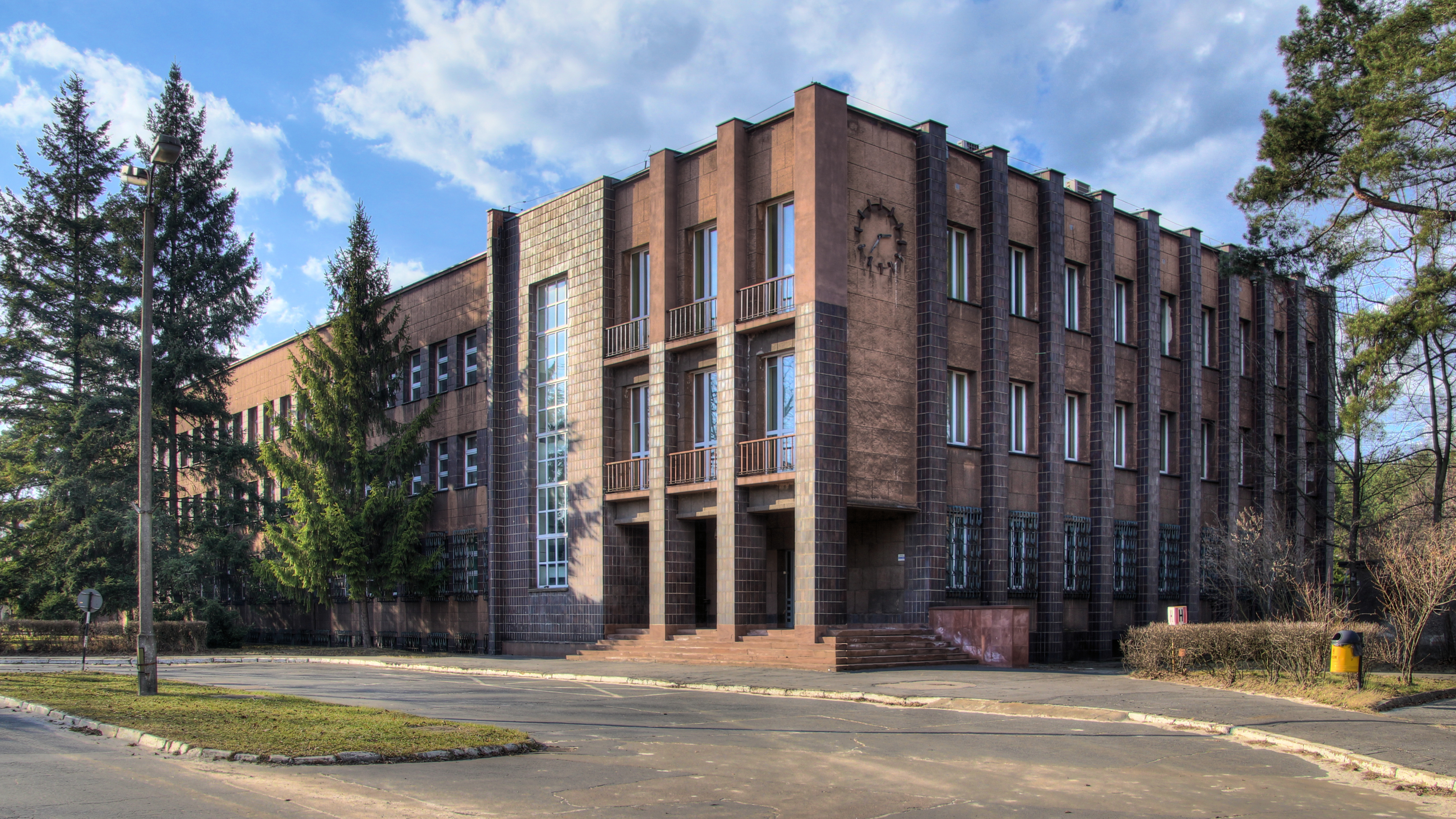
Huta Stalowa Wola headquarters

On 09.09.1997 the Tarnobrzeg Special Economic Zone "Euro-Park Wisłosan" was inaugurated. The land, which includes the area of the Stalowa Wola Subzone, belonged to Huta Stalowa Wola S.A., which, as a result of restructuring, had unused assets in the form of production buildings, not fully completed halls, storage rooms and developed plots for industrial development. The Stalowa Wola subzone is an active area of the Tarnobrzeg Special Economic Zone EURO-PARK WISŁOSAN, covering an area of 280 hectares. Entrepreneurs operating on the basis of permits issued by the Industrial Development Agency S.A. have incurred investment outlays here in the amount of PLN 1.71 billion, with total employment reaching almost 6,000 employees.

On 31.07.2021 an agreement was signed on the establishment of the company "Euro-Park Stalowa Wola" to manage the newly created investment zone. The zone was given the name "Strategic Investment Park - Euro-Park Stalowa Wola". It is an area of just under 1,000 hectares, located to the south of the existing plants, intended for industrial investments related to supporting the development and implementation of modern technologies in the fields of energy, electro mobility, transportation, hydrogen technology, aviation or automotive. The first major investment is a plant for the production of copper foil for the automotive industry, the investor is Korean technology giant SK Nexilis.

Stalowa Wola is an important point on the commercial map of the northern part of the Subcarpathian province. The city is home to shopping malls and centers, food, construction and furniture supermarkets.

== Cemeteries ==
- Stalowa Wola Municipal Cemetery
- Rozwadów Parish Cemetery
- Stalowa Wola Jewish Cemetery

== Transport ==
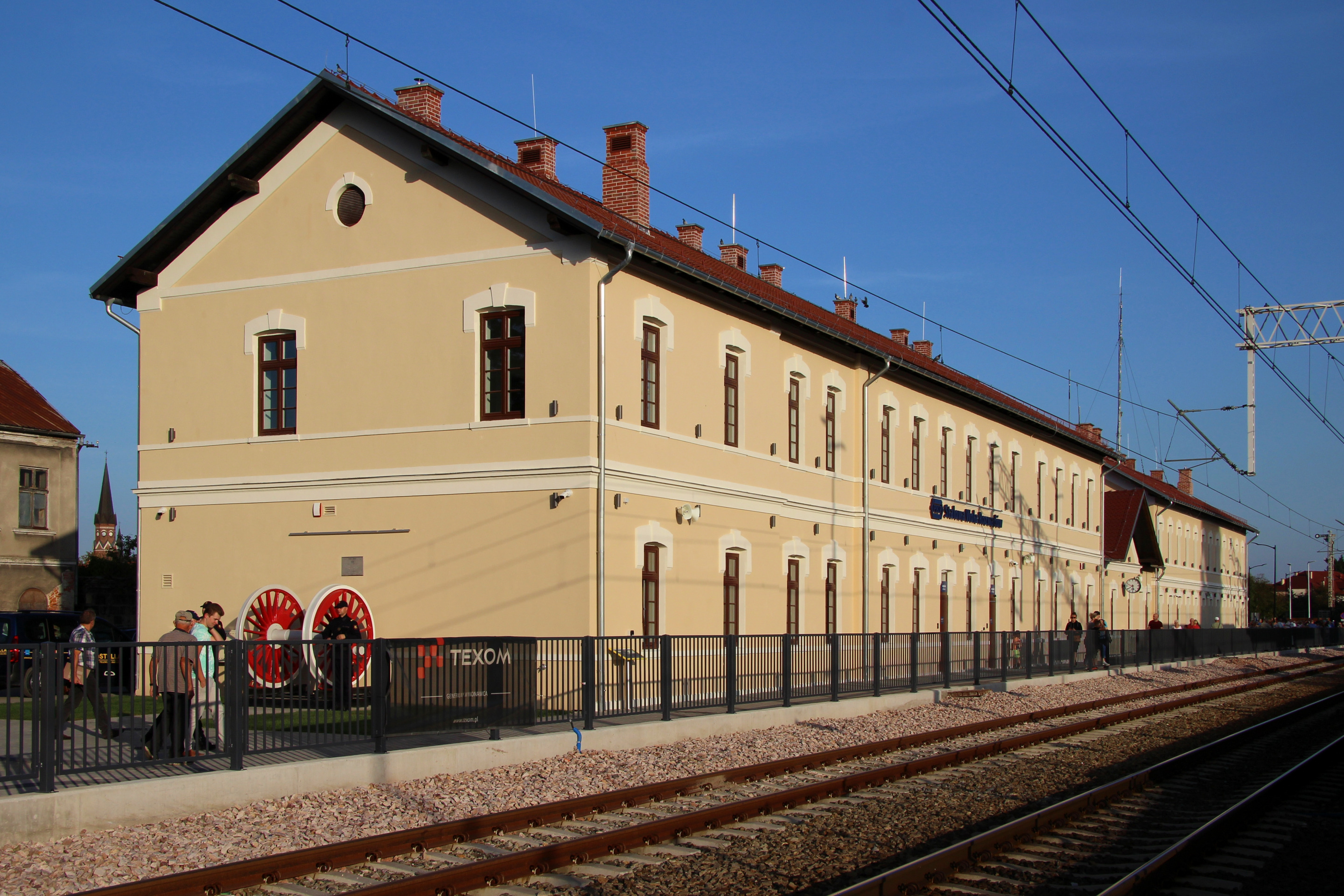
Stalowa Wola Rozwadów railway station

Polish State Railways (PKP) provides scheduled connections to Lublin, Warsaw, Kraków, Katowice, Wrocław, Rzeszów, Przemyśl and Odesa (in Ukraine). Summer connections are available to the TriCity (Gdańsk, Gdynia and Sopot) and Hel. The city has several railway stations that include: Stalowa Wola, Stalowa Wola South, Stalowa Wola Centre and Stalowa Wola Rozwadów, and is a main rail junction. All four stations are located on the main Przeworsk – Skarżysko-Kamienna line. Additionally, Stalowa Wola Rozwadów provides a northern connection with Lublin and, from Stalowa Wola South, a line runs east to Zamość, via Zwierzyniec. The ZMKS is the city's main public transit agency, operating a fleet of buses in Stalowa Wola and the surrounding districts.

== Sports ==
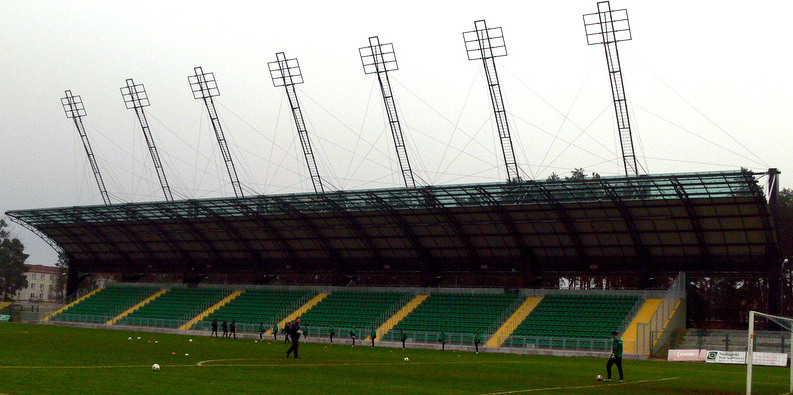
Subcarpathian Football Center

The city is a home for the professional football club Stal Stalowa Wola. They play their home matches at the Subcarpathian Football Center, opened in 2020. Previously, the amateur football club San Rozwadów existed in the city. Established in 2010, it competed in the lower tiers of Polish football, oscillating between the 7th and 8th divisions, yet did not enter the league for the 2022–2023 season.

== Notable people ==
- Marcin Nowak (born 1977), track and field and sprint athlete who competes internationally for Poland
- Artur Partyka (born 1969), former high jumper and two-time Olympic medallist
- Piotr Piechniak (born 1977), former Poland national football team international
- Grzegorz Rosiński (born 1941), comic book artist
- Omar Sangare (born 1970), actor, director and writer
- Krzysztof Soszynski (born 1977), Polish-Canadian professional mixed martial arts (MMA) fighter
- Ewa Strusińska (born 1976), international conductor
- Krzysztof Śmiszek (born 1979), politician, human rights activist
- Lucjan Trela (1942–2019), heavyweight boxer and Olympian
- Maciej Zakościelny (born 1980), actor
- Tobiasz Zarzeczny (born 2005), Super middleweight boxer

== International relations ==
=== Twin towns — Sister cities ===
Stalowa Wola is twinned with:

- Snina, Slovakia
- Evergem, Belgium

== See also ==
- Obelisk in Charzewice
