= Marian Kosiński =

Polish footballer and coach (1945–2021)

Personal information
- Date of birth: 4 December 1945
- Place of birth: Tarnowskie Góry, Poland
- Date of death: 21 April 2021 (aged 75)
- Height: 1.86 m (6 ft 1 in)
- Position: Central defender

Youth career
- Gwarek Tarnowskie Góry

Senior career*
Years	Team	Apps	(Gls)
–1969	Gwarek Tarnowskie Góry		
1969–1980	Stal Mielec	263	(2)

Managerial career
- 1980–1981: Stal Mielec (assistant)
- 1982–1983: Stal Mielec
- 1989–1990: Stal Mielec
- 1989–1990: Karpaty Krosno
- 1991–1992: Karpaty Krosno
- * Club domestic league appearances and goals

Marian Kosiński (4 December 1945 – 21 April 2021) was a Polish football manager and professional footballer who played as a central defender.

Before he went on to coach them, he won the title with Stal Mielec twice, and was listed in the Stal's all-time best XI.

== Honours ==
=== Player ===
Stal Mielec

- Ekstraklasa: 1972–73, 1975–76
