= Włodzimierz Gąsior =

Polish footballer and manager

Personal information
- Date of birth: 17 August 1948 (age 78)
- Place of birth: Mielec, Poland
- Position: Midfielder

Senior career*
Years	Team	Apps	(Gls)
1968–1977	Stal Mielec	175 (Note: Only includes data from the 1970–71 season onwards.)	(11)
1978–1979	Stal Stalowa Wola		
1979–1980	Wisłoka Dębica		
1980–1981	Chicago Horizons (futsal)		

Managerial career
- 1984–1985: Stal Mielec
- 1987–1990: Stal Mielec
- 1990–1991: Stal Mielec
- 1992: Hetman Zamość
- 1992–1993: Stal Stalowa Wola
- 1994: Motor Lublin
- 1994–1996: Siarka Tarnobrzeg
- 1996–1999: Korona Kielce
- 1999–2000: KSZO Ostrowiec
- 2001: Stal Mielec
- 2001–2002: Hetman Zamość
- 2002: ŁKS Łódź
- 2003–2006: Stal Mielec
- 2006–2007: Stal Mielec
- 2008–2009: Korona Kielce
- 2011: Korona Kielce
- 2012–2014: Stal Mielec
- 2015–2019: Siarka Tarnobrzeg
- 2021: Stal Mielec
- * Club domestic league appearances and goals

Włodzimierz Gąsior (born 17 August 1948) is a Polish professional football manager and former player who recently was the manager of Ekstraklasa club Stal Mielec.

After his football career, he played for the Chicago Horizons futsal team and was known as Wally Gasior.

== Honours ==
=== Player ===
Stal Mielec

- Ekstraklasa: 1972–73, 1975–76
- III liga: 1968–69

=== Manager ===
Stal Mielec

- II liga: 1987–88

Korona Kielce

- III liga, group IV: 1996–97
