= Serhiy Krykun =

Ukrainian footballer (born 1996)

Personal information
- Full name: Serhiy Viktorovych Krykun
- Date of birth: 22 September 1996 (age 30)
- Place of birth: Karpylivka, Ukraine
- Height: 1.75 m (5 ft 9 in)
- Positions: Midfielder; winger

Team information
- Current team: ŁKS Łódź
- Number: 19

Youth career
- FK Tsuman
- FK Piddubci
- 2014–2015: TOP 54 Biała Podlaska

Senior career*
| Years | Team | Apps | (Gls) |
| 2015–2017 | Podlasie Biała Podlaska | | |
| 2017–2019 | Garbarnia Kraków | 47 | (7) |
| 2019–2020 | Resovia Rzeszów | 33 | (5) |
| 2020–2023 | Górnik Łęczna | 97 | (14) |
| 2023–2025 | Piast Gliwice | 25 | (3) |
| 2024–2025 | → Stal Mielec (loan) | 19 | (1) |
| 2025– | ŁKS Łódź | 31 | (3) |
| 2026– | ŁKS Łódź II | 1 | (0) |
- * Club domestic league appearances and goals as of 15:44, 29 May 2026 (UTC)

Serhiy Viktorovych Krykun (Russian: Сергей Крикун; born 22 September 1996) is a Ukrainian professional footballer who plays as a midfielder or winger for I liga club ŁKS Łódź.

== Early life ==
Krykun was born in 1996 in Ukraine. He started playing football at the age of six. As a youth player, he played for FK Tsuman and FK Piddubci. In 2014, he moved to Poland, where he joined TOP 54 Biała Podlaska. In 2015, he became a player of Podlasie Biała Podlaska.

== Career ==
In 2017, Podlasie Biała Podlaska achieved promotion to III liga. In July 2017, he was transferred to Garbarnia Kraków, where he debuted on 12 August 2017 in a 3–1 win over Siarka Tarnobrzeg. His first goal in Garbarnia was scored by him a week later, in a 1–1 draw against Rozwój Katowice. At the end of the 2017–18 season, Garbarnia earned promotion to the I liga. His first Polish second-tier appearance came on played on 20 July 2018 in a 0–2 defeat to Stal Mielec. In that season, he played 18 matches, scoring two goals.

In the 2019–20 season, he played in Resovia, where he scored five goals in 31 matches. After winning the play-off games against Bytovia Bytów and Stal Rzeszów, Resovia was promoted to the I liga.

In 2020, Krykun signed for Polish side Górnik Łęczna on a free transfer. He helped the club achieve promotion in June 2021, after Górnik won their play-off matches against GKS Tychy and ŁKS Łódź. He debuted in Ekstraklasa on 24 July 2021 in a 1–1 draw against Cracovia. Across the 2021–22 season, he appeared in 32 games, without scoring a goal. At the end of that season, Górnik Łęczna dropped to I liga.

Throughout the 2022–23 campaign, he was Górnik's top league scorer, with 7 goals. His contract with Górnik expired at the end of June 2023.

On 7 June 2023, his transfer to Ekstraklasa club Piast Gliwice was announced, and he signed a three-year contract.

On 3 September 2024, Krykun moved to fellow top-flight side Stal Mielec on a season-long loan.

On 25 June 2025, Krykun was transferred to I liga club ŁKS Łódź on a deal until 30 June 2027.

== Style of play ==
Krykun mainly operates as a midfielder or winger. He is known for his speed.

== Personal life ==
Krykun is the son of Viktor and Olha Krykun. He has two brothers. In March 2023, he was granted Polish citizenship.

== Honours ==
Podlasie Biała Podlaska

- IV liga Lublin: 2015–16
