= Zygmunt Kukla (footballer) =

Polish footballer

Personal information
- Full name: Zygmunt Kukla
- Date of birth: 21 January 1948
- Place of birth: Nysa, Poland
- Date of death: 18 May 2016 (aged 68)
- Place of death: Mielec, Poland
- Height: 1.85 m (6 ft 1 in)
- Position: Goalkeeper

Youth career
- 1959–1966: Stal Mielec

Senior career*
Years	Team	Apps	(Gls)
1966–1980	Stal Mielec	340	(0)
1981–1983	Apollon Athens	65	(0)
Total		405	(0)

International career
1976–1979	Poland	20	(0)
- * Club domestic league appearances and goals

Zygmunt Kukla (21 January 1948 – 18 May 2016) was a Polish footballer who played as a goalkeeper. During his club career, he played for Stal Mielec and Apollon Athens.

== International career ==
He played for the Poland national team and participated in the 1978 FIFA World Cup.

=== International ===
Appearances, conceded goals and clean sheets by national team
National team	Year	Apps	Conceded Goals	Clean Sheets
Poland	1976	2	0	2
Poland	1977	2	4	1
Poland	1978	7	5	4
Poland	1979	9	5	5
Total		20	14	12

== Honours ==
Stal Mielec

- Ekstraklasa: 1972–73, 1975–76
