= Robert Kozielski =

Polish footballer (born 1968)

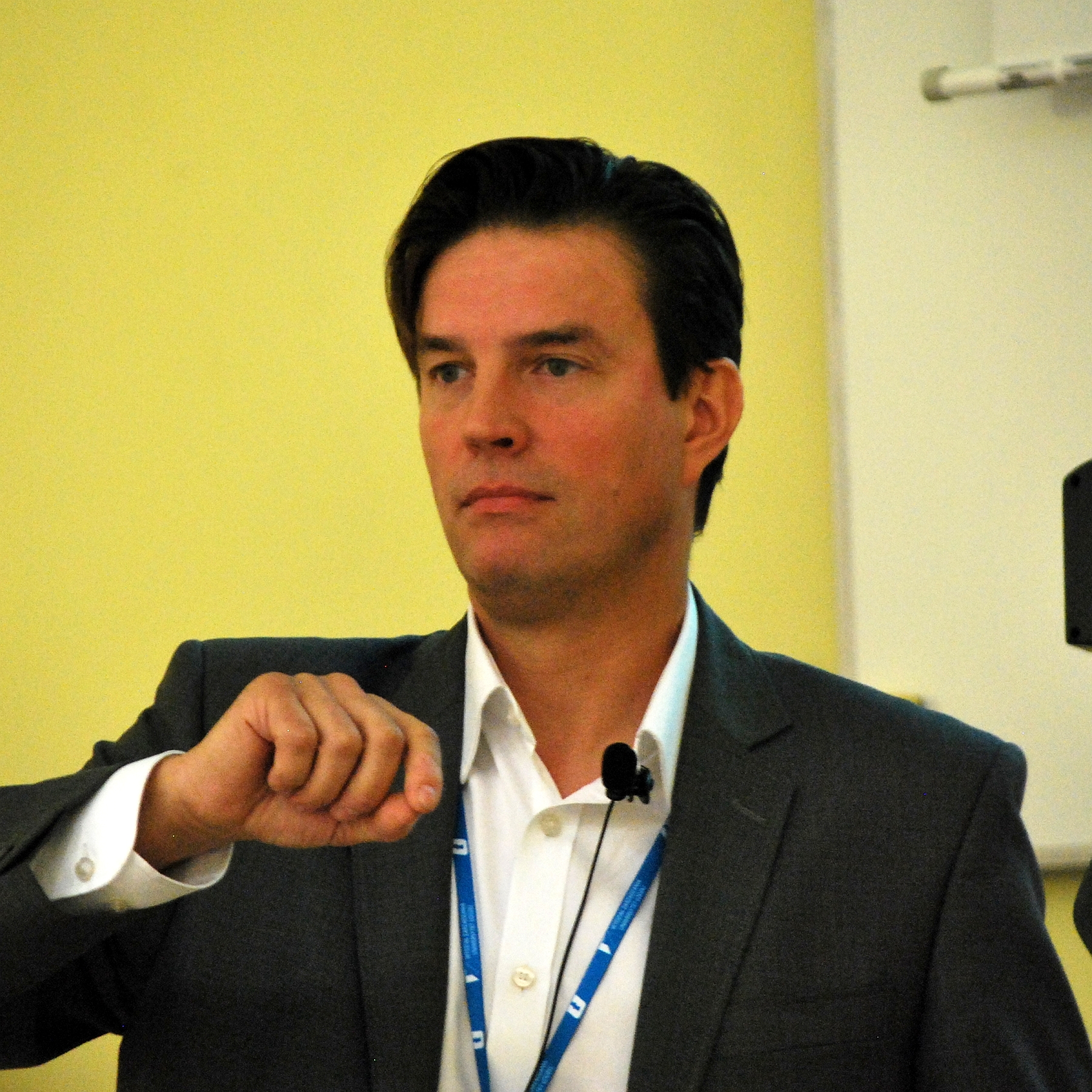
- Kozielski in 2014

Personal information
- Date of birth: 5 September 1968 (age 58)
- Place of birth: Łódź, Poland
- Height: 1.83 m (6 ft 0 in)
- Position: Forward

Senior career*
Years	Team	Apps	(Gls)
–1988	Orzeł Łódź		
1988–1989	ŁKS Łódź	21	(5)
- * Club domestic league appearances and goals

Robert Kozielski (born 5 September 1968) is a Polish former professional footballer who played as a forward. He is currently a professor at the University of Łódź, specialising in business and marketing. In 2022, he was awarded the Knight's Cross of the Order of Polonia Restituta.

== Career ==
Kozielski started his career with Polish third tier side Orzeł Łódź. In 1988, Kozielski signed for ŁKS Łódź in the Polish top flight, where he made 21 league appearances and scored 5 goals. On 31 July 1988, he scored a hat-trick on his debut for ŁKS in a 3–3 draw with Stal Mielec. At the age of 22, he retired due to injury.
