= Zbigniew Hnatio =

Polish footballer (1953–2014)

Personal information
- Full name: Zbigniew Hnatio
- Date of birth: 18 March 1953
- Place of birth: Kraków, Poland
- Date of death: 25 October 2014 (aged 61)
- Place of death: Hamilton, Ontario, Canada
- Height: 1.74 m (5 ft 9 in)
- Position: Midfielder

Youth career
- 1964–1970: Wisła Kraków

Senior career*
Years	Team	Apps	(Gls)
1970–1971	Wisła Kraków	2	(0)
1971–1974	Stal Stalowa Wola		
1974–1983	Stal Mielec	238	(4)
1983–1986	Cracovia		
1986–1987	Góral Żywiec		
1988	Wieczysta Kraków		
1989	Polonia Hamilton		

International career
1974–1976	Poland U21	11	(0)
1976	Poland	1	(0)
- * Club domestic league appearances and goals

Zbigniew Hnatio (born Zbigniew Stachel; 18 March 1953 – 25 October 2014) was a Polish footballer. He played in one match for the Poland national football team in 1976.

== Honours ==
Stal Mielec

- Ekstraklasa: 1975–76

Individual

- Polish Newcomer of the Year: 1975
