= Mirosław Smyła =

Polish football manager (born 1969)

Personal information
- Date of birth: 25 July 1969 (age 57)
- Place of birth: Bytom, Poland
- Position: Defender

Youth career
- 1981–1988: Polonia Bytom

Senior career*
Years	Team	Apps	(Gls)
1988–1996	Polonia Bytom	141	(5)
1996–1998	Concordia Knurów		
1998–1999	MKS Myszków	10	(0)
1999–2000	Concordia Knurów		

Managerial career
- 2001–2007: Orzeł Babienica/Psary
- 2008: Orzeł Babienica/Psary
- 2008–2010: GKS Tychy
- 2010–2013: Rozwój Katowice
- 2013–2015: Zagłębie Sosnowiec
- 2015–2016: Rozwój Katowice
- 2017–2018: Odra Opole
- 2019: Wigry Suwałki
- 2019–2020: Korona Kielce
- 2022: Podbeskidzie Bielsko-Biała
- * Club domestic league appearances and goals

Mirosław Smyła (born 25 July 1969) is a Polish professional football manager and former player who was most recently in charge of Polish I liga side Podbeskidzie Bielsko-Biała.
