= Bogusław Wyparło =

Polish footballer (born 1974)

Personal information
- Date of birth: 29 November 1974 (age 51)
- Place of birth: Mielec, Poland
- Height: 1.83 m (6 ft 0 in)
- Position: Goalkeeper

Team information
- Current team: Stal Mielec (goalkeeping coach)

Senior career*
Years	Team	Apps	(Gls)
1990–1996	Stal Mielec	174	(0)
1996–1997	Sokół Tychy	9	(0)
1997–2000	ŁKS Łódź	85	(0)
2000	Legia Warsaw	0	(0)
2000–2001	Ceramika Opoczno	37	(0)
2001	RKS Radomsko	5	(0)
2002	Pogoń Leżajsk	17	(0)
2002–2003	Piotrcovia	27	(0)
2003–2004	Pogoń Szczecin	29	(0)
2004–2013	ŁKS Łódź	245	(0)
2013–2016	Stal Mielec	20	(0)
Total		648	(0)

International career
1998–1999	Poland	3	(0)
- * Club domestic league appearances and goals

Bogusław Wyparło (born 29 November 1974) is a Polish former professional footballer who played as a goalkeeper. He earned three caps for the Poland national team. He currently works as a goalkeeping coach for I liga club Stal Mielec.

== Playing career ==
He is a trainee of Stal Mielec. He debuted in Ekstraklasa at the age of 16. Wyparło featured in all 34 matches of ŁKS Łódź's 1997–98 championship winning campaign. He made three appearances for the Poland national team.

== Coaching career ==
On 15 November 2011, Wyparło was appointed goalkeeping coach of ŁKS Łódź, while stile an active player for the first team. Between 2015 and 2021, he coached the goalkeepers at his former club Stal Mielec. He re-joined Stal Mielec's staff on 22 July 2026 ahead of the 2026–27 season.

== Honours ==
ŁKS Łódź

- Ekstraklasa: 1997–98
- I liga: 2010–11

Pogoń Szczecin

- I liga: 2003–04

Stal Mielec

- II liga: 2015–16
- III liga Lublin-Subcarpathia: 2012–13
