= Marek Chojnacki =

Polish footballer (born 1959)

Personal information
- Full name: Marek Stanisław Chojnacki
- Date of birth: 6 December 1959 (age 66)
- Place of birth: Łódź, Poland
- Height: 1.75 m (5 ft 9 in)
- Position: Defender

Senior career*
Years	Team	Apps	(Gls)
1978–1988	ŁKS Łódź	273	(41)
1989	Ethnikos Piraeus	27	(3)
1990–1996	ŁKS Łódź	179	(7)
1996–1998	Karkonosze Jelenia Góra		

International career
- Poland U18
1981	Poland	4	(0)

Managerial career
- 1996–1999: Karkonosze Jelenia Góra
- 1999–2000: Odra Opole
- 2000–2001: Czarni Żagań
- 2001: OKS 1945 Olsztyn
- 2002–2003: Stal Głowno
- 2004: ŁKS Łódź
- 2006–2007: ŁKS Łódź
- 2007: Pelikan Łowicz
- 2007: FC Vilnius
- 2007–2008: ŁKS Łódź
- 2009: Arka Gdynia
- 2010: Zawisza Rzgów
- 2010: Zagłębie Sosnowiec
- 2012: Zawisza Rzgów
- 2012: ŁKS Łódź
- 2012–2013: Zawisza Rzgów
- 2014–2015: ŁKS Łódź
- 2016–2025: UKS SMS Łódź (women)
Medal record
Men's football
Representing Poland
UEFA European Under-18 Championship
Third place	1978 Poland
- * Club domestic league appearances and goals

Marek Stanisław Chojnacki (born 6 December 1959) is a Polish professional football manager and former player who played as a defender. He was most recently in charge of Ekstraliga club UKS SMS Łódź.

== Club career ==
Chojnacki played for ŁKS Łódź in the Polish Ekstraklasa, appearing in 452 league matches. He had a spell in the Super League Greece with Ethnikos Piraeus

== International career ==
Chojnacki played for Poland at the 1979 FIFA World Youth Championship in Japan. He played 4 international matches for his country.

== Honours ==
=== Player ===
Poland U18

- UEFA European Under-18 Championship third place: 1978

=== Manager ===
UKS SMS Łódź

- Ekstraliga: 2021–22
- Polish Cup: 2022–23

=== Individual ===
- Ekstraklasa Hall of Fame: 2026
