= Przemysław Pitry =

Polish footballer and manager

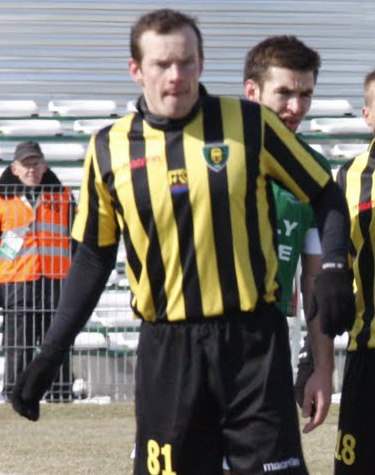
- Pitry with GKS Katowice in 2013

Personal information
- Full name: Przemysław Pitry
- Date of birth: 11 September 1981 (age 45)
- Place of birth: Pszczyna, Poland
- Height: 1.85 m (6 ft 1 in)
- Positions: Centre-back; forward

Team information
- Current team: Stal-Śrubiarnia Żywiec
- Number: 17

Youth career
- LKS Pszczyna
- Iskra Pszczyna
- GKS Tychy
- Iskra Pszczyna

Senior career*
Years	Team	Apps	(Gls)
2004–2005	Zagłębie Sosnowiec	28	(13)
2006	Amica Wronki	10	(1)
2006–2008	Lech Poznań	54	(7)
2008–2010	Górnik Zabrze	51	(6)
2010–2015	GKS Katowice	158	(32)
2015–2018	Górnik Łęczna	62	(8)
2018–2019	Rymer Rybnik	17	(14)
2019–2025	LKS Jawiszowice	135	(31)
2025–	Stal-Śrubiarnia Żywiec	22	(3)

Managerial career
- 2019–2022: LKS Jawiszowice (player-manager)
- 2020–2022: GKS Tychy (U17)
- 2022: GKS Tychy (caretaker)
- 2023: GKS Tychy (caretaker)
- 2023–2024: GKS Tychy (U19)
- * Club domestic league appearances and goals as of 19:43, 5 July 2026 (UTC)

Przemysław Pitry (born 11 September 1981) is a Polish professional footballer and manager, currently playing for V liga Silesia club Stal-Śrubiarnia Żywiec.

== Club career ==
Pitry also played for Zagłębie Sosnowiec and Amica Wronki.

On 5 October 2018, Pitry signed for Rymer Rybnik. In the summer of 2019, Pitry joined LKS Jawiszowice. The club announced on 16 December 2019, that Pitry would be the club's new manager.

== International career ==
Pitry was called up to the Poland national team, but has not played in any official game so far. His only game in a Polish jersey was a charity game versus Górny Śląsk in December 2006.

== Honours ==
LKS Jawiszowice

- Polish Cup (Oświęcim regionals): 2024–25
