= Janusz Białek =

Polish footballer

Personal information
- Date of birth: 10 October 1955 (age 71)
- Place of birth: Żelechów, Poland
- Height: 1.81 m (5 ft 11 in)
- Position: Defender

Youth career
- Sęp Żelechów
- AZS-AWF Warsaw

Senior career*
Years	Team	Apps	(Gls)
1982–1984	Stal Mielec		

Managerial career
- 1985–1991: Stal Mielec (assistant)
- 1991: Stal Mielec
- 1991–1992: Stal Mielec (assistant)
- 1992: Stal Mielec
- 1992: Stal Mielec (assistant)
- 1992–1993: Olimpia Poznań (assistant)
- 1993: Olimpia Poznań
- 1993–1995: Olimpia Poznań (assistant)
- 1995: Sokół Tychy
- 1996: GKS Bełchatów
- 1996–1998: Aluminium Konin
- 1998–1999: Ceramika Opoczno
- 1999–2001: Dyskobolia Grodzisk Wielkopolski
- 2001–2002: GKS Katowice
- 2002: Polonia Warsaw
- 2003: Aluminium Konin
- 2004–2005: Szczakowianka Jaworzno
- 2005: Heko Czermno
- 2006: Zagłębie Sosnowiec
- 2007: Stal Mielec
- 2007–2008: Odra Wodzisław
- 2008: Odra Wodzisław
- 2009: Stal Mielec
- 2009–2010: Stal Stalowa Wola
- 2010–2011: Poland U19
- 2011–2012: Poland U17 & U20
- 2012–2013: Poland U19
- 2014–2016: Stal Mielec
- 2017: Stal Stalowa Wola
- * Club domestic league appearances and goals

Janusz Białek (born 10 October 1955) is a Polish retired football manager and former player.

== Honours ==
Stal Mielec

- II liga: 2015–16
