= Aleksander Brożyniak =

Polish footballer and coach

Personal information
- Date of birth: 2 January 1944 (age 82)
- Place of birth: Przemyśl, Poland
- Position: Midfielder

Senior career*
Years	Team	Apps	(Gls)
- Czuwaj Przemyśl
- AZS AWF Warsaw
1968–1970	Resovia Rzeszów	15	(1)

Managerial career
- 1970–1972: Resovia Rzeszów
- 1973–1974: Stal Mielec
- 1975–1977: Wisła Kraków
- 1977–1978: GKS Tychy
- 1978–1979: Hutnik Kraków
- 1979–1980: Polonia Bytom
- 1982–1983: Gwardia Warsaw
- 1983–1984: Broń Radom
- 1984–1985: Siarka Tarnobrzeg
- Błękitni Kielce
- Wawel Kraków
- 1987–1989: Wisła Kraków
- 1990: Pogoń Szczecin
- 1994–1995: Okocimski KS Brzesko
- 1997–1998: Okocimski KS Brzesko
- 1998–1999: Hutnik Kraków
- 1999–2001: Górnik Wieliczka
- 2002: Pogoń Staszów
- 2002–2005: Lubań Maniowy
- 2005–2006: BKS Bochnia
- 2006: AKS Busko-Zdrój
- 2006: Wróblowianka Kraków
- 2007–2008: Skalnik Trzemeśnia
- 2008: Unia Tarnów
- 2009: Limanovia Limanowa
- 2011–2014: Hejnał Krzyszkowice
- * Club domestic league appearances and goals

Aleksander Brożyniak (born 2 January 1944) is a Polish former professional football manager and player.

== Playing career ==
Brożyniak played for Czuwaj Przemyśl, AZS AWF Warsaw and Resovia Rzeszów.

== Coaching career ==
Brożyniak managed Resovia Rzeszów, Wisła Kraków, Broń Radom, Pogoń Szczecin, AKS Busko Zdrój, Hutnik Kraków, BKS Bochnia, ZKS Unia Tarnów.
