= Zbigniew Robakiewicz =

Polish footballer

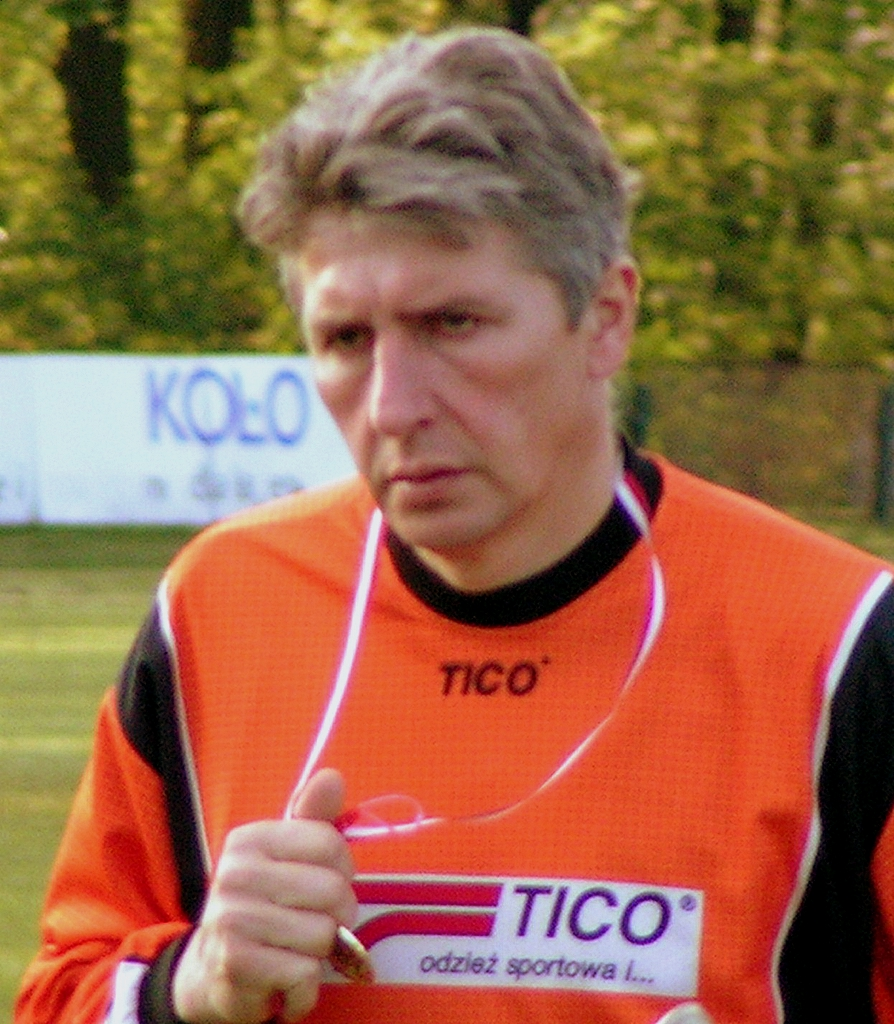

Personal information
- Date of birth: 28 November 1966 (age 59)
- Place of birth: Opoczno, Poland
- Height: 1.80 m (5 ft 11 in)
- Position: Goalkeeper

Youth career
- 1978–1985: ŁKS Łódź

Senior career*
Years	Team	Apps	(Gls)
1985–1986	ŁKS Łódź	28	(0)
1987–1995	Legia Warsaw	153	(0)
1995–1996	ŁKS Łódź	34	(0)
1996–1997	Iraklis	31	(0)
1997–1998	Legia Warsaw	7	(0)
1999	Ceramika Opoczno		
1999	Okęcie Warsaw		
2000–2001	Legia Warsaw	45	(0)
2001	Dyskobolia Grodzisk	8	(0)
2002–2003	Widzew Łódź	49	(0)
2004–2005	Tur Turek		

International career
1994	Poland	1	(0)

Managerial career
- 2005–2016: GKS Bełchatów (goalkeeping coach)
- 2016–2017: Korona Kielce (goalkeeping coach)
- 2017–2018: Wigry Suwałki (goalkeeping coach)
- * Club domestic league appearances and goals

Zbigniew Robakiewicz (born 28 November 1966) is a Polish former professional footballer who played as a goalkeeper.

== Honours ==
Legia Warsaw

- Ekstraklasa: 1993–94, 1994–95
- Polish Cup: 1988–89, 1989–90, 1993–94, 1994–95
- Polish Super Cup: 1994
