= Grzegorz Lato =

Polish footballer and manager (born 1950)

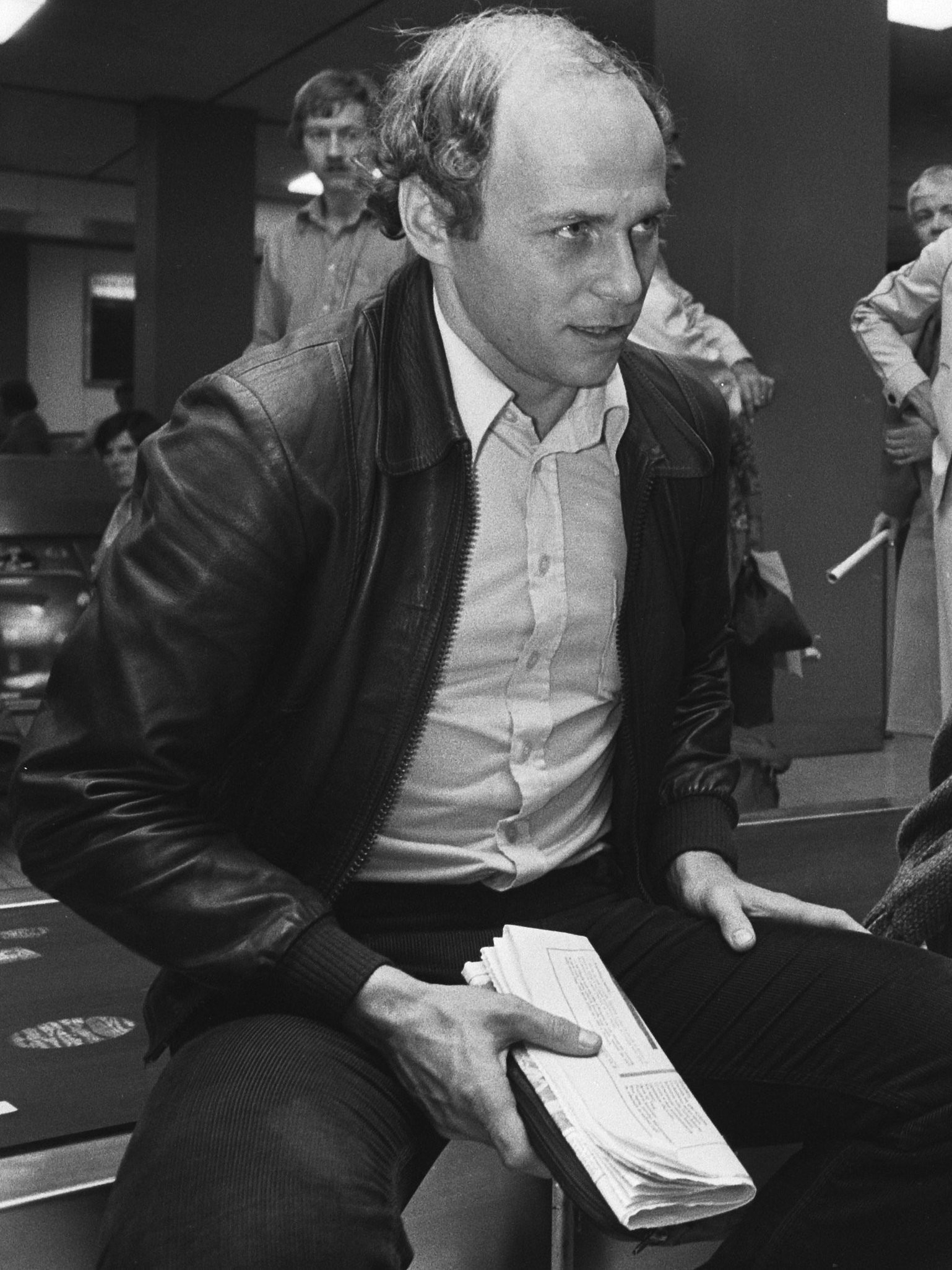
- Lato in 1979

Member of Senate
- In office 20 October 2001 – 18 October 2005
- Preceded by: Józef Frączek
- Succeeded by: Władysław Ortyl

25th President of the PZPN
- In office 30 October 2008 – 26 October 2012
- Preceded by: Michal Listkiewicz
- Succeeded by: Zbigniew Boniek

Personal details
- Born: 8 April 1950 (age 76) Malbork, Poland
- Party: Democratic Left Alliance
- Height: 1.75 m (5 ft 9 in)
- Occupation: Footballer (retired); Football manager (retired); Politician; Football administrator
Association football career
- Position: Winger
Senior career*
Years	Team	Apps	(Gls)
1966–1980	Stal Mielec	295	(117)
1980–1982	Lokeren	64	(12)
1982–1984	Atlante	45	(16)
1984–1990	Polonia Hamilton	54	(20)
Total		447	(165)
International career
1971–1984	Poland	100	(45)
Managerial career
- 1988–1990: North York Rockets
- 1991–1993: Stal Mielec
- 1993–1995: Olimpia Poznań
- 1995–1996: Amica Wronki
- 1996–1997: Stal Mielec
- 1997: Kavala
- 1999: Widzew Łódź
Medal record
Men's football
Representing Poland
FIFA World Cup
Third place	1974 West Germany
Third place	1982 Spain
Olympic Games
Gold medal – first place	1972 Munich	Team
Silver medal – second place	1976 Montreal	Team
- * Club domestic league appearances and goals

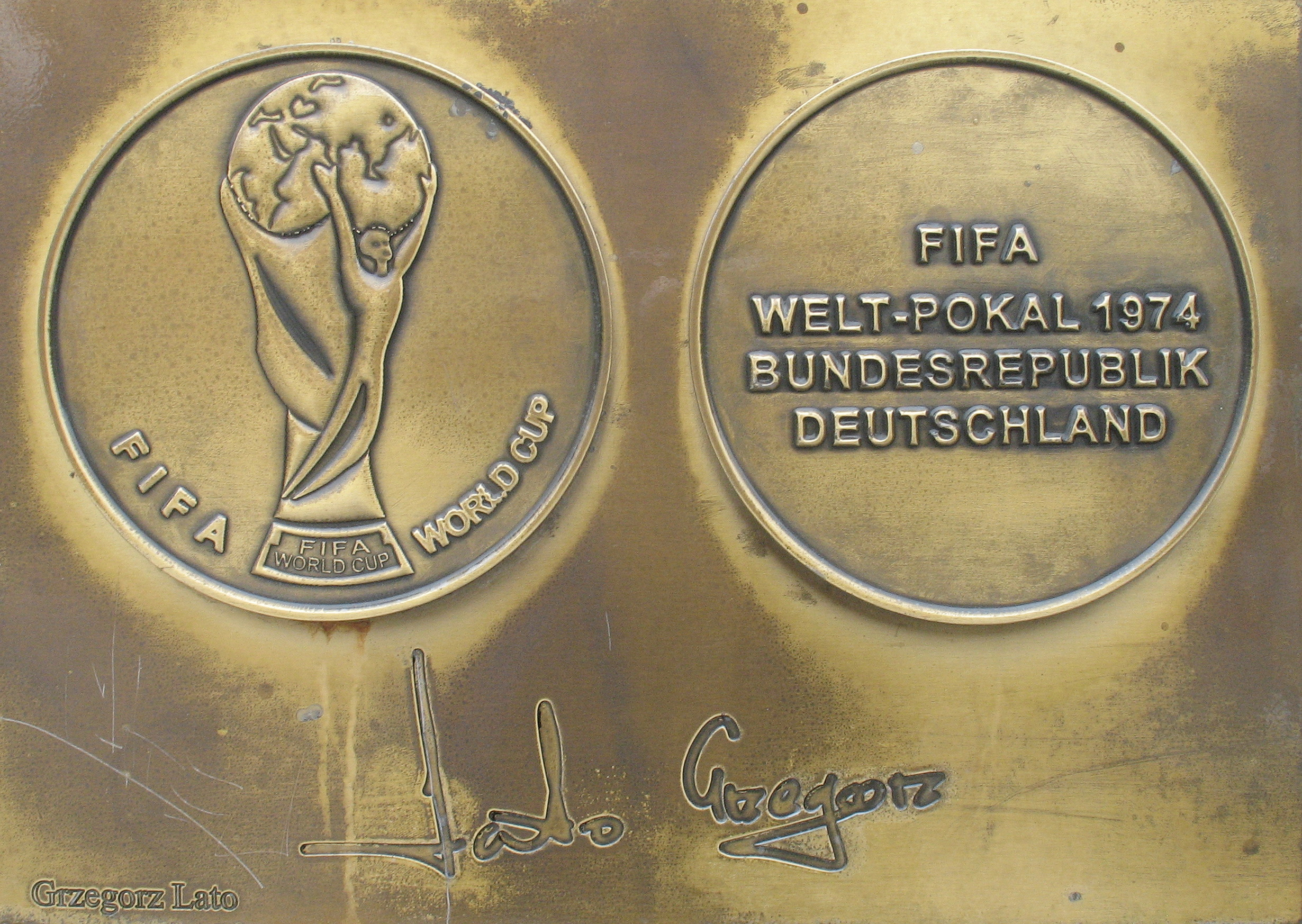
Copy of G.Lato medal and autograph in Sports Star Avenue in Dziwnów

Grzegorz Bolesław Lato (Polish pronunciation: [ˈɡʐɛɡɔʐ ˈlatɔ]; born 8 April 1950) is a Polish former professional football player and manager who played as a winger. He was a member of Poland's golden generation of football players who rose to fame in the 1970s and early 80s. Over a decade, he represented Poland at five major tournaments starting with gold at the 1972 Summer Olympic Games in Munich and ending with a third-place finish at the 1982 FIFA World Cup in Spain. He reached the peak of his career at the 1974 World Cup, where he was the leading scorer and the only Pole to-date to have won the honour. In 1981, he won the Polish Footballer of the Year Award presented by the Piłka Nożna football weekly. After retiring from his playing career, he had a brief stint as manager in several clubs in and out of Poland.

Lato, as a member of Democratic Left Alliance, was a Polish Senator for the Rzeszów region, between 2001 and 2005.

On 30 October 2008, he was elected president of the Polish Football Association (PZPN). As president of the PZPN he oversaw the Euro 2012 tournament, which was co-hosted by Poland. He was succeeded by Zbigniew Boniek on 26 October 2012. He is patron of the Mielec Municipal Stadium, which has been officially renamed the Grzegorz Lato Municipal Stadium in his honour.

== Club career ==
=== Stal Mielec ===
Lato was born in Malbork. He arrived at Stal Mielec as a teenager in 1966. Over the next 14 years, he led Stal from the Second Division to the top tier of Polish football and its most successful era in its history. During his time there, the club would go on to win the Ekstraklasa—the Polish First-Division—twice, in 1973 and 1976, as well as be regular participants in European competitions. This era of success culminated with their appearance at the quarter-finals of the 1975–76 UEFA Cup. He inspired the club's good form with his prolific goal scoring, amassing 111 goals in 272 appearances. He was the top scorer of the Ekstraklasa during the 1972–73 and 1974–75 seasons.

=== Later career ===
In 1980, having turned 30, Lato was finally free to leave Poland to pursue his career abroad. Despite his age, his international performances had garnered him interest. Lato ended up receiving a personal invitation from Pelé to play for the New York Cosmos. However, he ultimately decided on settling in Belgium playing for K.S.C. Lokeren, scoring 12 goals over 2 seasons. By 1982, Lato decided to move on, signing for Atlante F.C. in Mexico where he amassed 15 goals. In 1984, he played in Canada in one match in the National Soccer League. He spent the rest of the 1980s playing amateur football in Hamilton, Ontario for Polonia Hamilton—a club founded by Polish immigrants. In 1991 he decided to retire from football.

== International career ==
Lato represented the Poland national team for 13 years during the 1970s and 80s earning a total of 100 caps. He won his first cap under legendary Poland coach Kazimierz Górski in a qualifying game for the 1972 European Championships against West-Germany. The game ended as 1–3 loss. He was able to translate his prolific domestic goal-scoring record onto the international stage, where he became renowned for his striking prowess, especially in big games.

His final game before retirement was on 17 April 1984, a friendly against Belgium. He was subbed off in the 85th and Poland lost the game 0–1. Lato amassed 45 goals and the third highest goal scoring total in Poland national team history, second only to that of Robert Lewandowski and Włodzimierz Lubański. He also had an impressive goal scoring record of 0.43 goals per game. He was the first Polish player to reach a century of caps.

=== World Cup ===
==== 1974 World Cup ====
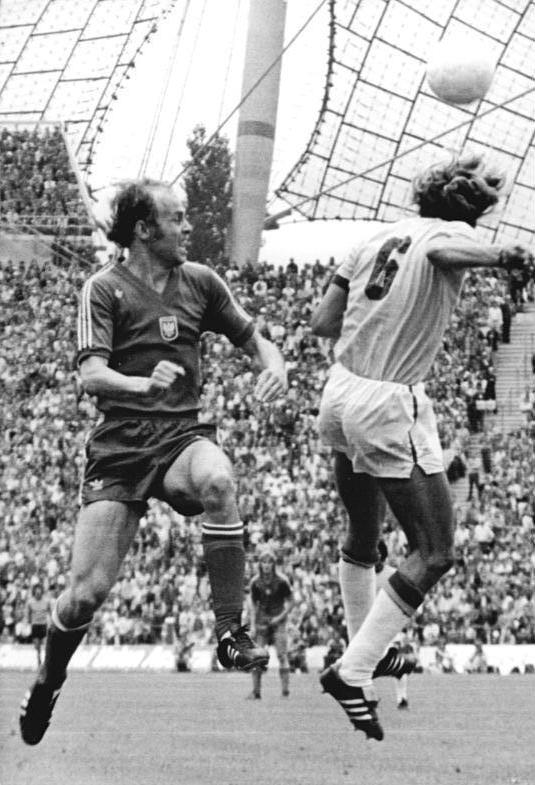
Lato (left) at the 1974 World Cup during a match against Brazil

The highpoint of Lato's professional career came during the 1974 World Cup in West Germany. Poland had a tough first round, having been seeded in Group 4, along with Argentina and Italy as well as Haiti. Lato went on to have immediate impact. In Poland's first game against Argentina, he scored 2 goals leading Poland to a historic 3–2 win. Buoyed, Poland hammered Haiti in the next game 7–0, with Lato adding another 2 goals. Finally Poland beat Italy 2–1, to end the group-stage as undefeated winners of Group 4.

In the second round, Poland were seeded into Group B with West Germany, Sweden and Yugoslavia. Lato continued his great form as the tournament progressed. Poland defeated Sweden 1–0 and Yugoslavia 2–1, with Lato contributing the winning goals in both games. Poland's final game of the group of was against West Germany. The Germans had also defeated Sweden and Yugoslavia, tying both teams on points. Thus, the game would prove decisive in deciding who would finish Group B 1st or 2nd—the winner would go to the final, the loser would go to the third-place play-off. Poland played a strong game, often threatening the West-German goal. However, Lato was unable to score and Poland succumbed to a 1–0 defeat—their only loss of the tournament.

Poland's final game of the tournament was the third-place playoff against holders Brazil. In a tight game, Lato again proved to be the difference, scoring the only goal and leading the Poland national team to a Bronze finish. He ended the tournament as top goalscorer, having scored 7 goals.

==== 1978 World Cup ====
Lato had arguably had been Poland's best player at the 1974 World Cup. However, by the time of the 1978 tournament in Argentina he was unable to replicate his great form. In the first round, Poland were seeded in Group 2 with West Germany, Mexico and Tunisia. Poland did well, winning the group by drawing 0–0 with West Germany, and winning against Tunisia and Mexico, 1–0 and 3–1 respectively. Lato, however, was only able to score one goal, albeit a decisive one against Tunisia.

In the second round, Poland found themselves in the "group of death" against Argentina and Brazil—both tournament favorites—and Peru. Lato couldn't resurrect his form from four years prior, only mustering a single goal against Brazil. Poland ultimately finished third place having been beaten by both the hosts Argentina and Brazil 0–2 and 1–3 respectively. Poland managed to beat Peru 1–0 but that wasn't enough to secure 2nd place in Group B and they were duly eliminated. Having played in all of Poland's 6 games, Lato ended the tournament with only 2 goals.

==== 1982 World Cup ====
Lato was 32 by the time Poland qualified for the 1982 FIFA World Cup in Spain. His age was getting the better of him and he lacked the electrifying pace that defined his earlier career. Lato was still a first team player, but during Poland's 7 games at the tournament he managed only a solitary goal in Poland's 5–1 thrashing of Peru in the first round. However, several players had risen in a new generation of great Polish players, chief among them Zbigniew Boniek—who scored a hat-trick against Belgium—were able to fill the void. Despite his lack of goals Lato still contributed to the team play and played and important role. In the end, Poland reached the third-place playoff against France. They went on to win 3–2 and Lato added another Bronze World Cup medal to his collection.

=== Olympic Games ===
Lato won medals at two Summer Olympics football competitions: a gold medal at the 1972 Summer Olympics and a silver medal at the 1976 Summer Olympics.

== Managerial career ==
In 1996 he graduated from the School of Coaches of the Polish Football Association. After finishing his football career, he became a coach. Initially, he coached in Canada where he became manager of North York Rockets(1988–1990). He then returned to his old club Stal Mielec (1991–1993 and 1996–1997) before coaching several other Polish clubs: Olimpia Poznań (1993–1995) and Amica Wronki (1995–1996). He had a brief stint in Greece as manager of Kavala (1997) before he finally returned to Poland and eventually retired from managing with Widzew Łódź (1999).

== After football ==
Lato, as a member of Democratic Left Alliance, was a Polish Senator for the Rzeszow region, between 2001 and 2005.

In October 2008, he was elected President of the Polish FA (PZPN). In a 2011 interview, Lato said that if Poland didn't progress to the Euro 2012 quarterfinals he would hand in his resignation from the position of President of the Polish FA. After Poland's 0–1 defeat by the Czech Republic on 16 June 2012—which officially knocked them out of Euro 2012 in the group stages—he refused to resign. He did not seek reelection and was replaced by Zbigniew Boniek, in October 2012.

On 29 November 2023, Lato was honored by being designated as the patron of the Mielec Municipal Stadium, in accordance with Resolution No. LXVIII/690/2023 of the Mielec City Council. A commemorative plaque recognizing this honor was unveiled during a ceremony on 23 July 2024.

== Playing style ==
Lato was a right-winger renowned more for his consistency and teamwork than for entertaining flair. His awareness on the pitch, coupled with his flexibility, as he often played as a forward contributed to his success at both the international and club levels.

== Career statistics ==
=== Club ===
Appearances and goals by club, season and competition
Club	Season	League	Total	
Club	Season	League	Apps	Goals
Stal Mielec	1969–70	I liga	18	6
Stal Mielec	1970–71	Ekstraklasa	26	11
Stal Mielec	1971–72	Ekstraklasa	23	11
Stal Mielec	1972–73	Ekstraklasa	24	13
Stal Mielec	1973–74	Ekstraklasa	30	13
Stal Mielec	1974–75	Ekstraklasa	29	19
Stal Mielec	1975–76	Ekstraklasa	30	14
Stal Mielec	1976–77	Ekstraklasa	29	9
Stal Mielec	1977–78	Ekstraklasa	25	6
Stal Mielec	1978–79	Ekstraklasa	29	8
Stal Mielec	1979–80	Ekstraklasa	27	7
Stal Mielec	Total		290	117
KSC Lokeren	1980–81	Belgian Pro League	33	6
KSC Lokeren	1981–82	Belgian Pro League	31	6
KSC Lokeren	Total		64	12
Atlante	1982–83	Liga MX	36	15
Atlante	1983–84	Liga MX	5	1
Atlante	Total		41	16
Polonia Hamilton			52	20
Career total			447	165

=== International ===
Appearances and goals by national team and year
National team	Year	Apps	Goals
Poland	1971	2	0
Poland	1972	1	0
Poland	1973	6	3
Poland	1974	14	11
Poland	1975	10	8
Poland	1976	10	5
Poland	1977	12	5
Poland	1978	13	5
Poland	1979	10	3
Poland	1980	11	4
Poland	1981	3	0
Poland	1982	7	1
Poland	1983	0	0
Poland	1984	1	0
Total		100	45

Scores and results list Poland's goal tally first, score column indicates score after each Lato goal.

List of international goals scored by Grzegorz Lato
No.	Date	Venue	Opponent	Score	Result	Competition
1	19 August 1973	Varna, Bulgaria	Bulgaria	1–0	2–0	Friendly
2	19 August 1973	Varna, Bulgaria	Bulgaria	2–0	2–0	Friendly
3	26 September 1973	Chorzów, Poland	Wales	2–0	3–0	1974 FIFA World Cup qualification
4	15 May 1974	Warsaw, Poland	Greece	1–0	2–0	Friendly
5	15 June 1974	Stuttgart, West Germany	Argentina	1–0	3–2	1974 FIFA World Cup
6	15 June 1974	Stuttgart, West Germany	Argentina	3–1	3–2	1974 FIFA World Cup
7	19 June 1974	Munich, West Germany	Haiti	1–0	7–0	1974 FIFA World Cup
8	19 June 1974	Munich, West Germany	Haiti	7–0	7–0	1974 FIFA World Cup
9	26 June 1974	Stuttgart, West Germany	Sweden	1–0	1–0	1974 FIFA World Cup
10	30 June 1974	Frankfurt, West Germany	Yugoslavia	2–1	2–1	1974 FIFA World Cup
11	6 July 1974	Munich, West Germany	Brazil	1–0	1–0	1974 FIFA World Cup
12	1 September 1974	Helsinki, Finland	Finland	2–1	2–1	UEFA Euro 1976 qualifying
13	4 September 1974	Warsaw, Poland	East Germany	1–0	1–3	Friendly
14	9 October 1974	Poznań, Poland	Finland	3–0	3–0	UEFA Euro 1976 qualifying
15	26 March 1975	Poznań, Poland	United States	1–0	7–0	Friendly
16	26 March 1975	Poznań, Poland	United States	5–0	7–0	Friendly
17	28 May 1975	Halle, East Germany	East Germany	1–0	2–1	Friendly
18	24 June 1975	Seattle, United States	United States	2–0	4–0	Friendly
19	6 July 1975	Montreal, Canada	Canada	2–0	8–1	Friendly
20	6 July 1975	Montreal, Canada	Canada	5–1	8–1	Friendly
21	6 July 1975	Montreal, Canada	Canada	8–1	8–1	Friendly
22	10 September 1975	Chorzów, Poland	Netherlands	1–0	4–1	UEFA Euro 1976 qualifying
23	25 July 1976	Montreal, Canada	North Korea	3–0	5–0	1976 Summer Olympics
24	25 July 1976	Montreal, Canada	North Korea	5–0	5–0	1976 Summer Olympics
25	31 July 1976	Montreal, Canada	East Germany	1–2	1–3	1976 Summer Olympics
26	16 October 1976	Porto, Portugal	Portugal	1–0	2–0	1978 FIFA World Cup qualification
27	16 October 1976	Porto, Portugal	Portugal	2–0	2–0	1978 FIFA World Cup qualification
28	15 May 1977	Limassol, Cyprus	Cyprus	1–1	3–1	1978 FIFA World Cup qualification
29	29 May 1977	Buenos Aires, Argentina	Argentina	1–0	1–3	Friendly
30	12 June 1977	La Paz, Bolivia	Bolivia	1–0	2–1	Friendly
31	7 September 1977	Volgograd, Soviet Union	Soviet Union	1–2	1–4	Friendly
32	21 September 1977	Chorzów, Poland	Denmark	2–0	4–1	1978 FIFA World Cup qualification
33	5 April 1978	Poznań, Poland	Greece	1–0	5–2	Friendly
34	26 April 1978	Warsaw, Poland	Bulgaria	1–0	1–0	Friendly
35	6 June 1978	Rosario, Argentina	Tunisia	1–0	1–0	1978 FIFA World Cup
36	21 June 1978	Mendoza, Argentina	Brazil	1–1	1–3	1978 FIFA World Cup
37	6 September 1978	Reykjavík, Iceland	Iceland	2–0	2–0	UEFA Euro 1980 qualifying
38	21 March 1979	Algiers, Algeria	Algeria	1–0	1–0	Friendly
39	4 April 1979	Chorzów, Poland	Hungary	1–0	1–1	Friendly
40	29 August 1979	Warsaw, Poland	Romania	1–0	3–0	Friendly
41	26 March 1980	Budapest, Hungary	Hungary	1–2	1–2	Friendly
42	4 April 1980	Brussels, Belgium	Belgium	1–2	1–2	Friendly
43	22 June 1980	Warsaw, Poland	Iraq	2–0	3–0	Friendly
44	29 June 1980	São Paulo, Brazil	Brazil	1–0	1–1	Friendly
45	22 June 1982	A Coruña, Spain	Peru	2–0	5–1	1982 FIFA World Cup

== Honours ==
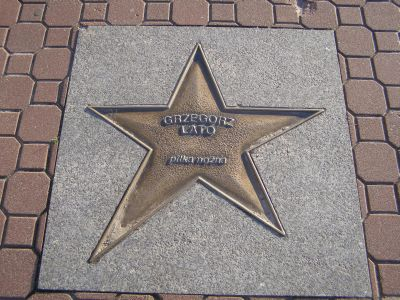
Lato's star in Władysławowo, pictured in 2006

Stal Mielec

- Ekstraklasa: 1972–73, 1975–76
- Polish Cup finalist: 1976

Lokeren SC

- Belgian Cup finalist: 1981

Atlante F.C.

- CONCACAF Champions Cup: 1983

Poland

- Olympic gold medal: 1972
- Olympic silver medal: 1976
- FIFA World Cup third place: 1974, 1982

Individual

- FIFA World Cup Golden Shoe: 1974
- FIFA World Cup All-Star Team: 1974
- Piłka Nożna Polish Footballer of the Year: 1977, 1981
- Sport Player of the Year: 1974, 1977
- Ekstraklasa top scorer: 1972–73, 1974–75
- World XI: 1974, 1975
- Sport Ideal European XI: 1974, 1975
- Polish Football Association National Team of the Century: 1919–2019

National

- Gold Cross of Merit: 1972
- Polish Football Association Golden Badge: 1972
- Knight's Cross of the Order of Polonia Restituta: 1974
- Officer's Cross of the Order of Polonia Restituta: 1982

== See also ==
- List of footballers with 100 or more caps

Awards and achievements
Preceded by Gerd Müller	FIFA World Cup Golden Shoe; 1974	Succeeded by Mario Kempes
Sporting positions
Preceded by Robert Zawłocki	President of Polish Football Association; 30 October 2008 – 26 October 2012	Succeeded by Zbigniew Boniek
