= GKS Tychy =

Association football club

- Full name: Górniczy Klub Sportowy Tychy
- Founded: 20 April 1971; 55 years ago
- Ground: Stadion Miejski
- Capacity: 15,300
- Owner(s): The Seelig Group; Chien Lee
- Chairman: Maximilian Kothny
- Manager: René Poms
- League: II liga
- 2025–26: I liga, 18th of 18 (relegated)
- Website: https://kp-gkstychy.pl
Home colours	Away colours	Third colours

GKS Tychy is a Polish professional football club, based in Tychy, that competes in the Polish II liga. The club was founded in 1971. It played in the Ekstraklasa between 1974–1977 and 1995–1997. Their biggest success was a second-place finish in the 1975–76 Ekstraklasa season.

== History ==
The history of GKS Tychy dates back to 20 April 1971, when the government of the county of Tychy, together with Communist party activists (PZPR), decided to form a powerful sports organization. As a result of the merger of Polonia Tychy, Górnik Wesoła and Górnik Murcki, a strong, multi-department sports club was formed, with football and ice hockey as its major departments. Before the creation of GKS Tychy, ice hockey players of Górnik Murcki had twice won the Polish Cup (1967 and 1971).

The decision to merge the teams from Murcki and Wesoła was not welcomed by members of local communities, who wanted to keep their organizations. The Tychy County government did not care about these concerns, as the plan was to form a strong club, with top class athletes. GKS Tychy was financially supported by local coal mines, from Tychy, Lędziny, Wesoła and Bieruń. A new, 20,000 stadium was built, together with a swimming pool and ice-skating rink. By 1973, GKS Tychy had over 600 athletes in seven departments, including football, ice hockey, wrestling, and track and field.

Two years after its creation, the football team of GKS Tychy won promotion to the second level of Polish football tier, and in early summer of 1974, the team was promoted to Ekstraklasa. With its topscorer Roman Ogaza, Tychy in August 1974 debuted in Ekstraklasa, in a 1–1 game vs. Lech Poznań. In 1975–76 Ekstraklasa, GKS Tychy finished second, after Polish champion Stal Mielec, and in the UEFA Cup, it played against West German side Köln. In the first leg, in Cologne (15 September 1976), Tychy lost 0–2. In the second leg, which took place on 29 September 1976 at Silesian Stadium in Chorzów, Polish team tied 1-1, after a goal by Roman Ogaza. Ogaza himself was a member of Polish football team, which won silver in the 1976 Summer Olympics in Montreal, becoming the first athlete in the history of Tychy to win an olympic medal.

In the 1976–77 Ekstraklasa, GKS Tychy, to the surprise of experts, was relegated from Polish top division, despite the fact that its top players remained at Tychy. After several seasons in Polish Second Division, GKS was once again relegated (1983) to the third level of Polish football tier, remaining there until 1993. After a merger with Sokół Pniewy, the new team, called Sokół Tychy-Pniewy, played in 1995–96 Ekstraklasa and 1996–97 Ekstraklasa. Due to financial difficulties, the team was dissolved in 1997. Soon afterwards, new organization, called Tyski Klub Sportowy Tychy was founded. Later on, the team eventually returned to the historic name GKS Tychy and won promotion to the I liga (second tier) in 2012. In the 2020–21 season GKS qualified to promotion play-offs to the Ekstraklasa, but lost to the final winner Górnik Łęczna.

In April 2021, The Seelig Group (TSG) and Chien Lee of NewCity Capital together acquired 75% of GKS Tychy and became the controlling shareholders. Tyski Sport S.A. remains as 25% shareholder.

== Home stadium ==
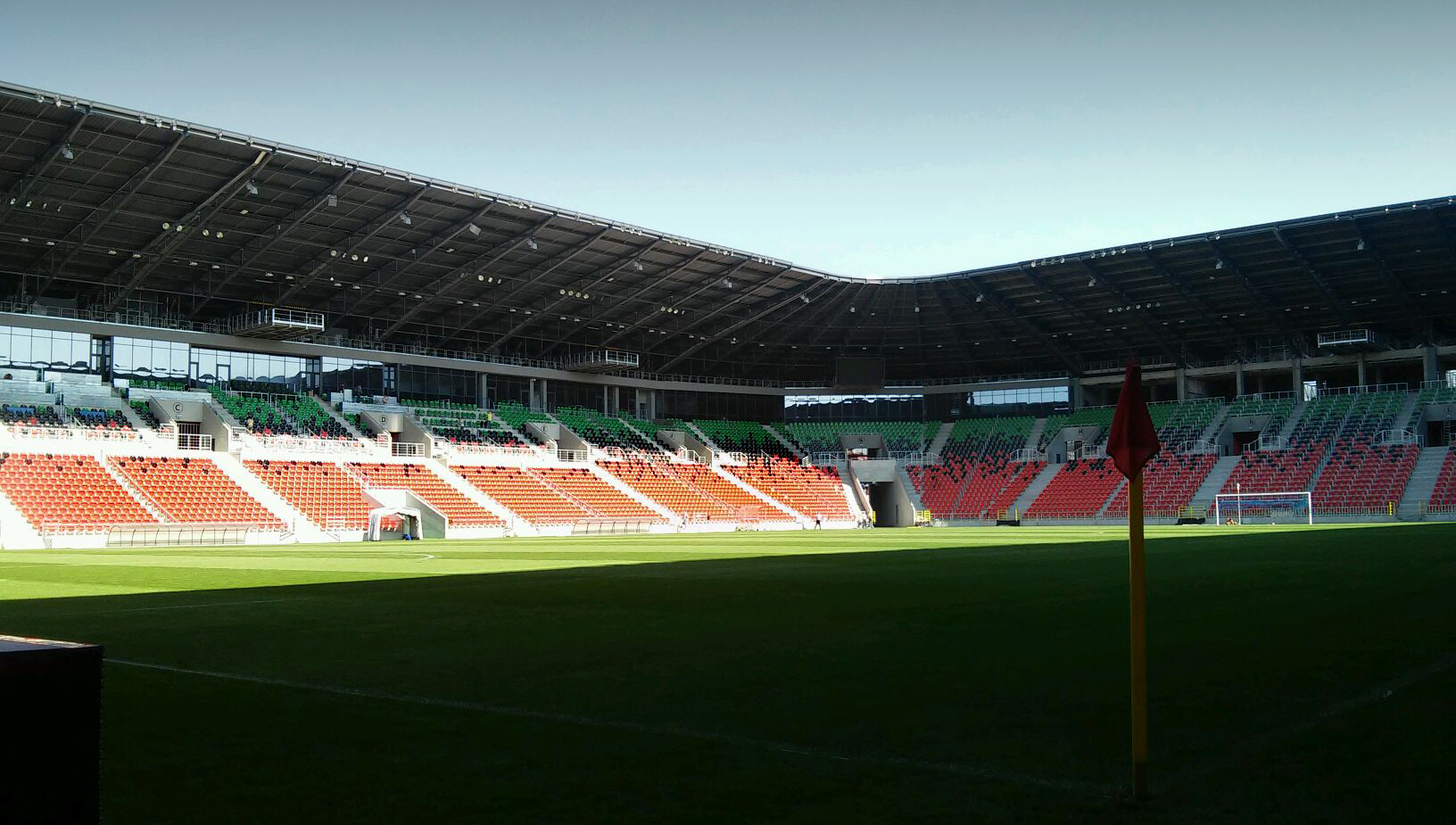
Stadion Miejski, home venue of GKS Tychy

The Stadion Miejski (English: Municipal Stadium) is located in Tychy, Poland. It is the home ground of GKS Tychy. The stadium holds 15,300 people.

== Previous names ==
- 20 April 1971 – 1996: Górniczy Klub Sportowy Tychy
- 1996: Sokół Tychy
- 1997: Górniczy Klub Sportowy Tychy
- 1998: TKS Tychy
- 2000: Górnośląski Klub Sportowy Tychy '71
- 2008: Górniczy Klub Sportowy Tychy

== GKS Tychy in Europe ==
Season	Competition	Round		Club	Score
1976–77	UEFA Cup	1R	(Germany)	1. FC Köln	0–2, 1–1

== Players ==
=== Current squad ===
As of 10 September 2026

Note: Flags indicate national team as defined under FIFA eligibility rules; some limited exceptions apply. Players may hold more than one non-FIFA nationality.

No.	Pos.	Nation	Player
5	DF	CRO	Matija Horvat
6	MF	POL	Oskar Wojtczak
7	MF	GER	Noel Niemann
8	MF	SVK	Matúš Begala
9	FW	POL	Mateusz Lewandowski
10	MF	POL	Damian Kądzior (vice-captain)
11	MF	POL	Mateusz Koniuszy
13	GK	POL	Tymoteusz Proczek
14	DF	POL	Łukasz Tumala
16	DF	POL	Paweł Olkowski
17	FW	POL	Dawid Kasprzyk
19	MF	POL	Michał Trąbka
21	DF	POL	Bartosz Jankowski
26	DF	POL	Igor Łasicki (captain)

No.	Pos.	Nation	Player
27	DF	POL	Bartosz Brzęk
30	MF	POL	Piotr Gębala
31	GK	POL	Kacper Myszkowski
39	GK	POL	Jakub Mądrzyk
44	MF	POL	Nico Baier
45	DF	POL	Daniel Hoyo-Kowalski
75	DF	POL	Józef Chorosiński
77	MF	AUT	Josip Eškinja
79	MF	POL	Marcin Kozina
99	FW	POL	Tymoteusz Ryguła
—	FW	POL	Kacper Plichta (on loan from Motor Lublin)
—	GK	AUT	Pirmin Strasser
—	MF	POL	Denis Śleziona

=== Notable players ===
Had international caps for their respective countries. Players listed in bold represented their countries while playing for Tychy.

Poland

- (Poland) Krzysztof Bizacki (1990–1993, 1995–1996, 2008–2014)
- (Poland) Eugeniusz Cebrat (1971–1977, 1979–1983)
- (Poland) Piotr Ćwielong (2017–2019)
- (Poland) Jerzy Dudek (1995–1996) **(pictured)**
- (Poland) Dariusz Fornalak (1996–1997)
- (Poland) Seweryn Gancarczyk (2015–2017)
- (Poland) Radosław Gilewicz (1991–1992)
- (Poland) Dariusz Grzesik (1984, 2004)
- (Poland) Bartosz Karwan (1993)
- (Poland) Damian Kądzior (2025–present)
- (Poland) Jakub Kiwior (2012–2016)
- (Poland) Ryszard Komornicki (1980–1982)
- (Poland) Marcin Kowalczyk (2018–2020)
- (Poland) Ryszard Kraus (1994–1995)
- (Poland) **Jerzy Ludyga** (1975–1979)
- (Poland) Janusz Nawrocki (1995–1997)
- (Poland) Krzysztof Nowak (1995–1996)
- (Poland) **Roman Ogaza** (1975–1978)
- (Poland) Paweł Olkowski (2026–present)
- (Poland) **Lechosław Olsza** (1975–1977)
- (Poland) Sebastian Przyrowski (2015)
- (Poland) Marcin Radzewicz (2014–2018)
- (Poland) Marek Rzepka (1995–1997)
- (Poland) Michał Stasiak (2015)
- (Poland) Krystian Szuster (1996–1997)
- (Poland) Rafał Szwed (1996–1997)
- (Poland) Jakub Świerczok (2016–2017)
- (Poland) Bogusław Wyparło (1996–1997)

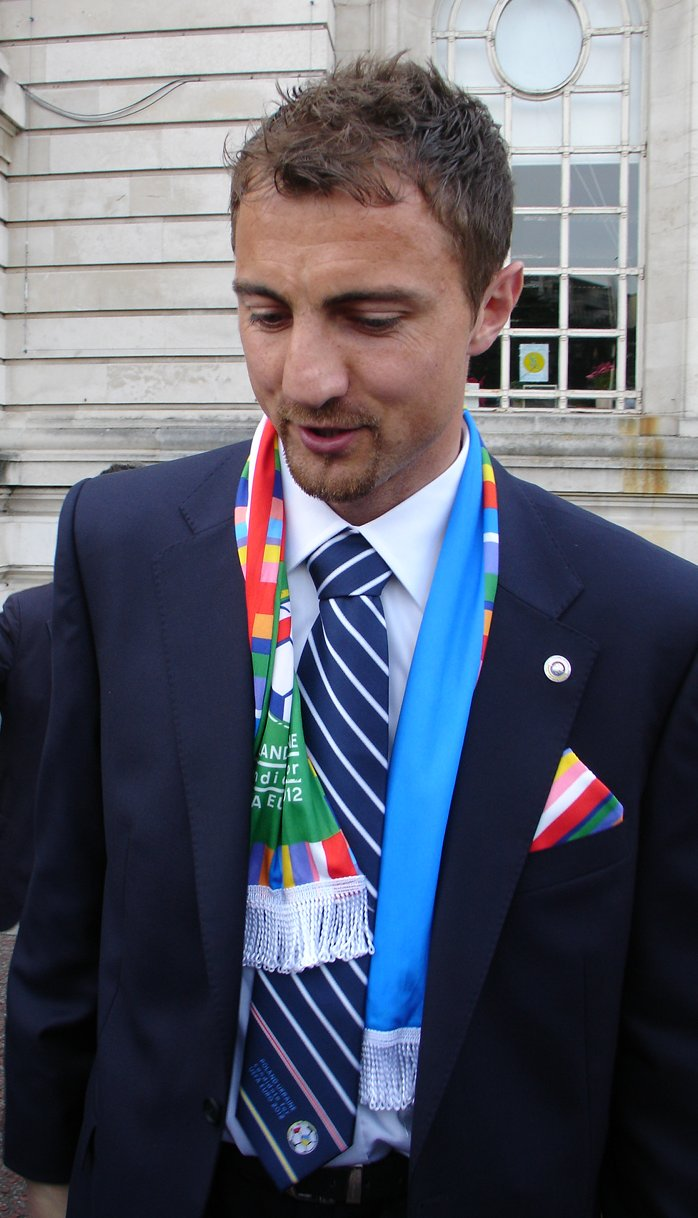
Jerzy Dudek

Bosnia & Herzegovina

- (Bosnia and Herzegovina) Filip Arežina (2016)

Democratic Republic of the Congo

- (Democratic Republic of the Congo) Wilson Kamavuaka (2020)

Estonia

- (Estonia) **Ken Kallaste** (2019–2020)

Kyrgyzstan

- (Kyrgyzstan) **Edgar Bernhardt** (2018–2019)

Mexico

- (Mexico) Carlos Peña (2019)

Moldova

- (Moldova) Eugen Zasavițchi (2017)

Slovakia

- (Slovakia) Tomáš Malec (2021–2023)

Slovenia

- (Slovenia) Denis Popovič (2014)

Soviet Union

- (Russia) (Ukraine) Valeri Panchik (1993)

Trinidad and Tobago

- (Trinidad and Tobago) Keon Daniel (2018–2020)

Zimbabwe

- (Zimbabwe) Edelbert Dinha (1995–1996)

== Managerial history ==
Caretaker managers listed in italics.

- (Poland) Aleksander Mandziara (1975–1977)
- (Poland) Wacław Sąsiadek (1977)
- (Poland) Aleksander Brożyniak (1977–1978)
- (Poland) Stanisław Świerk (1978)
- (Poland) Edward Lorens (1989)
- (Poland) Albin Wira (1990–1992)
- (Poland) Janusz Białek (1995)
- (Poland) Marek Kostrzewa (1995)
- (Poland) Bogusław Kaczmarek (1995–1996)
- (Poland) Albin Wira (1996)
- (Poland) Marek Kostrzewa (1996)
- (Poland) Jerzy Wyrobek (1997)
- (Poland) Albin Wira (2003–2004)
- (Poland) Dariusz Grzesik (2004–2006)
- (Poland) Albin Wira (2006–2007)
- (Poland) Damian Galeja (2007–2008)
- (Poland) Mirosław Smyła (2008–2010)
- (Poland) Adam Nocoń (2010–2011)
- (Poland) Maciej Mizia (2011)
- (Poland) Mirosław Smyła (2011)
- (Poland) Piotr Mandrysz (2011–2013)
- (Poland) Tomasz Fornalik (2013)
- (Poland) Jan Żurek (2013–2014)
- (Poland) Przemysław Cecherz (2014)
- (Poland) Tomasz Wolak (2014)
- (Poland) Tomasz Hajto (2014–2015)
- (Poland) Kamil Kiereś (2015–2016)
- (Russia) (Poland) Yuriy Shatalov (2016–2017)
- (Poland) Ryszard Tarasiewicz (2017–2020)
- (Poland) Ryszard Komornicki (2020)
- (Poland) Tomasz Horwat & Jarosław Zadylak (2020)
- (Poland) Artur Derbin (2020–2022)
- (Poland) Przemysław Pitry & Jarosław Zadylak (2022)
- (Poland) Dominik Nowak (2022–2023)
- (Poland) Przemysław Pitry (2023)
- (Poland) Dariusz Banasik (2023–2024)
- (Poland) Artur Skowronek (2024–2025)
- (United States) (Poland) Michael Chojnicki (2025)
- (Poland) Łukasz Piszczek (2025–2026)
- (Austria) Rene Poms (2026–present)

== Coaching staff ==
As of 11 March 2026

Position	Staff
Manager	(Austria) René Poms
Assistant coaches	(Poland) Marcin Paczkowski (Croatia) Dino Škvorc
Goalkeeping coach	(Poland) Bartosz Kowalczyk
Assistant goalkeeping coach	(Poland) Hubert Makowski
Match analyst	(Poland) Jakub Słota
Fitness coach	(Poland) Damian Fos
Team manager	(Poland) Mateusz Długasiewicz
Kitman	(Poland) Sławomir Skowroński
Physiotherapists	(Poland) Robert Cypcer (Poland) Radosław Krowiak
Masseur	(Poland) Janusz Wolski

== Other sports ==
Active sections:

- Basketball
- Ice hockey (men's)
- Ice hockey (women's)
- Football (women's)
- Futsal (men's)
- Esports
