= Dariusz Grzesik =

Polish footballer

Personal information
- Full name: Dariusz Paweł Grzesik
- Date of birth: 10 January 1966 (age 60)
- Place of birth: Tychy, Poland
- Position: Midfielder

Senior career*
Years	Team	Apps	(Gls)
–1984	GKS Tychy		
1985–1987	Piast Gliwice		
1987–1994	GKS Katowice	178	(3)
1995–1997	Ruch Chorzów		
1997–1998	MKS Lędziny		
1999–2000	Rozwój Katowice		
2000	Bobrek Karb Bytom		
2002	Ogrodnik Cielmice		
2002–2003	Sokół Wola		
2004	MKS Lędziny		
2004	GKS Tychy '71		

International career
1990–1993	Poland	3	(0)

Managerial career
- 2004–2006: GKS Tychy '71
- 2006–2007: Nadwiślan Góra
- 2007–2008: Pniówek Pawłowice
- Ogrodnik Cielmice
- 2009–2010: Sokół Wola
- * Club domestic league appearances and goals

Dariusz Paweł Grzesik (born 10 January 1966) is a Polish football manager and former professional player who played as a midfielder.

== Honours ==
GKS Katowice

- Polish Cup: 1990–91, 1992–93

Ruch Chorzów

- Polish Cup: 1995–96
