= Jerzy Ludyga =

Polish footballer (1950–1999)

Personal information
- Full name: Jerzy Rafał Ludyga
- Date of birth: 24 October 1950
- Place of birth: Piekary Śląskie, Poland
- Date of death: 1 March 1999 (aged 48)
- Place of death: Piekary Śląskie, Poland
- Position: Defender

Senior career*
Years	Team	Apps	(Gls)
- GKS Julian Piekary Śląskie
- Olimpia Piekary Śląskie
1968–1974	Szombierki Bytom	81+	(3+)
1974–1975	Motor Lublin		
1975–1979	GKS Tychy	55+	(3+)

International career
1977	Poland	1	(0)
- * Club domestic league appearances and goals

Jerzy Rafał Ludyga (24 October 1950 – 1 March 1999) was a Polish footballer who played as a defender.

== Career ==
Having started his career in his hometown Piekary Śląskie, his club career was spent in the second and first divisions. He scored 3 goals for Szombierki Bytom and another 3 for GKS Tychy in the top flight in 85 and 55 appearances respectively. He won the vice-championship with the latter in 1976, in what was the golden era for the club. He also had stint in the second tier with Motor Lublin. He played in one match for the Poland national team on 15 May 1977, in a 3–1 friendly win against Cyprus.

== Bibliography ==
- Piotr Zawadzki (2014), GKS wicemistrzem jest. Opowieść o tyskiej drużynie wszech czasów (in Polish), Tychy
