= Marek Kostrzewa =

Polish footballer

Personal information
- Date of birth: 19 June 1957 (age 69)
- Place of birth: Lublin, Poland
- Height: 1.80 m (5 ft 11 in)
- Position: Midfielder

Senior career*
Years	Team	Apps	(Gls)
1975–1976	Budowlani Lublin		
1976–1978	KS Lublinianka		
1978–1982	Avia Świdnik		
1982–1984	Górnik Knurów		
1984–1988	Górnik Zabrze	104	(1)
1988–1991	AS Cherbourg		
1991–1992	Górnik Pszów		
1992–1993	Górnik Zabrze	12	(0)
1993–1994	Błękitni Kielce		

International career
1987	Poland	1	(0)

Managerial career
- 1995: Sokół Tychy
- 1996: Sokół Tychy
- 2005: Górnik Łęczna
- 2007: Górnik Zabrze
- 2016–2017: Górnik Zabrze II
- * Club domestic league appearances and goals

Marek Kostrzewa (born 19 June 1957) is a Polish professional football manager and former player.

== Honours ==
Górnik Zabrze

- Ekstraklasa: 1984–85, 1985–86, 1986–87
