= Ensar Arifović =

Bosnian-Herzegovinian footballer (born 1980)

Personal information
- Full name: Ensar Arifović
- Date of birth: 21 July 1980 (age 46)
- Place of birth: Sarajevo, SFR Yugoslavia
- Height: 1.84 m (6 ft 0 in)
- Position: Striker

Senior career*
| Years | Team | Apps | (Gls) |
| 1998–2001 | FC Metz | 0 | (0) |
| 2001–2002 | Neuchâtel Xamax | 26 | (3) |
| 2002–2003 | FK Sarajevo | 2 | (0) |
| 2003–2004 | Dibba Al-Hisn | | |
| 2005 | Željezničar | 4 | (0) |
| 2005–2006 | Polonia Warsaw | 24 | (6) |
| 2006–2008 | ŁKS Łódź | 55 | (14) |
| 2008–2009 | Jagiellonia | 15 | (3) |
| 2009–2010 | Górnik Zabrze | 8 | (0) |
| 2010–2011 | Flota Świnoujście | 44 | (7) |
| 2011–2012 | Arka Gdynia | 14 | (3) |
| 2012–2014 | Flota Świnoujście | 63 | (11) |
| Total | | 255 | (47) |
- * Club domestic league appearances and goals

Ensar Arifović (born 21 July 1980 in Sarajevo) is a Bosnian-Herzegovinian retired professional footballer who played as a striker

== Club career ==
In February 2010, he joined Flota Świnoujście.

In July 2011, he moved to Arka Gdynia on a one-year contract.
