= Witold Bendkowski =

Polish football player

Personal information
- Full name: Witold Stefan Bendkowski
- Date of birth: 2 September 1961 (age 65)
- Place of birth: Rawa Mazowiecka, Poland
- Height: 1.82 m (6 ft 0 in)
- Position: Defender

Senior career*
Years	Team	Apps	(Gls)
1980–1981	Unia Skierniewice		
1981–1989	ŁKS Łódź	201	(1)
1989–1992	Yukong Elephants	48	(2)
1993–1999	ŁKS Łódź	175	(1)
2000–2001	Unia Skierniewice		

International career
1988	Poland	5	(0)
- * Club domestic league appearances and goals

Witold Stefan Bendkowski (born 2 September 1961) is a Polish former professional footballer who played as a defender. He played for Polish clubs Unia Skierniewice and ŁKS Łódź, as well as the South Korean club Yukong Elephants.

== Honours ==
ŁKS Łódź

- Ekstraklasa: 1997–98
