= 1972–73 Ekstraklasa =

47th season of top-tier football league in Poland

I liga
- Season: 1972–73
- Dates: 26 July 1972 – 24 June 1973
- Champions: Stal Mielec (1st title)
- Relegated: None (Polonia & Odra played playoff relegation)
- European Cup: Stal Mielec
- Cup Winners' Cup: Legia Warsaw
- UEFA Cup: Ruch Chorzów; Gwardia Warsaw
- Matches: 182
- Goals: 373 (2.05 per match)
- Top goalscorer: Grzegorz Lato (13 goals)
- Biggest home win: Stal 5–0 Gwardia; Legia 5–0 ŁKS; Zagłębie W. 5–0 Polonia
- Biggest away win: Polonia 0–6 Stal
- Highest scoring: Gwardia 4–2 Odra; Pogoń 5–1 Odra; Polonia 0–6 Stal
- Highest attendance: 60,000
- Total attendance: 2,690,506
- Average attendance: 14,783 ▲14.0%

The 1972–73 I liga was the 47th season of the Polish Football Championship and the 39th season of the I liga, the top Polish professional league for association football clubs, since its establishment in 1927. The league was operated by the Polish Football Association (PZPN).

The champions were Stal Mielec, who won their 1st Polish title.

== Competition modus ==
The season started on 26 July 1972 and concluded on 24 June 1973 (autumn-spring league). The season was played as a round-robin tournament. The team at the top of the standings won the league title. A total of 14 teams participated, 12 of which competed in the league during the 1971–72 season, while the remaining two were promoted from the 1971–72 II liga. Each team played a total of 26 matches, half at home and half away, two games against each other team. Teams received two points for a win and one point for a draw.

== League table ==
Pos	Team	Pld	W	D	L	GF	GA	GD	Pts	Qualification
1	Stal Mielec (C)	26	13	10	3	47	21	+26	36	Qualification to European Cup first round
2	Ruch Chorzów	26	13	7	6	29	16	+13	33	Qualification to UEFA Cup first round
3	Gwardia Warsaw	26	8	14	4	31	22	+9	30	Qualification to UEFA Cup first round
4	Górnik Zabrze	26	10	10	6	23	15	+8	30	
5	Wisła Kraków	26	13	4	9	31	28	+3	30	
6	ŁKS Łódź	26	9	11	6	26	26	0	29	
7	ROW Rybnik	26	8	10	8	20	21	−1	26	
8	Legia Warsaw	26	6	11	9	29	28	+1	23	Qualification to Cup Winners' Cup first round
9	Pogoń Szczecin	26	8	7	11	28	30	−2	23	
10	Zagłębie Sosnowiec	26	8	6	12	30	31	−1	22	
11	Zagłębie Wałbrzych	26	8	6	12	22	31	−9	22	
12	Lech Poznań	26	6	10	10	16	26	−10	22	
13	Polonia Bytom	26	7	6	13	20	42	−22	20	Qualification to Relegation playoffs
14	Odra Opole	26	3	12	11	21	36	−15	18	Qualification to Relegation playoffs

Source: 90minut.pl (in Polish)
(C) Champions

== Results ==
Home \ Away	GÓR	GWA	LPO	LEG	ŁKS	OOP	POG	BYT	RYB	RUC	STA	WIS	ZSO	ZWA
Górnik Zabrze		0–0	3–0	2–1	1–3	1–0	1–0	1–0	1–0	0–0	1–1	0–1	1–0	0–1
Gwardia Warsaw	1–1		1–1	1–0	4–0	4–2	3–0	3–1	0–1	3–1	0–0	0–1	2–2	3–1
Lech Poznań	0–0	0–0		1–0	0–1	2–0	0–0	2–1	0–0	0–0	3–0	3–0	2–1	0–0
Legia Warsaw	1–4	0–0	0–0		5–0	1–1	2–3	2–1	3–0	0–0	0–3	1–1	3–1	3–0
ŁKS Łódź	0–0	1–0	0–0	1–1		3–1	1–0	0–1	0–0	1–2	0–0	1–1	2–1	3–1
Odra Opole	1–0	1–1	0–0	2–2	1–1		2–2	0–0	0–1	1–0	2–2	3–0	1–1	0–1
Pogoń Szczecin	1–0	1–1	2–0	0–1	0–0	5–1		1–0	0–0	0–1	1–3	1–3	2–0	1–0
Polonia Bytom	2–2	0–0	2–0	0–0	2–0	2–1	1–1		3–0	0–0	0–6	1–4	2–1	1–0
ROW Rybnik	1–2	0–0	4–0	0–0	0–0	0–0	2–1	4–0		1–0	0–3	2–1	1–0	1–1
Ruch Chorzów	0–0	1–1	3–0	2–0	2–1	1–0	0–2	2–0	1–0		2–2	2–0	3–0	3–1
Stal Mielec	0–0	5–0	3–2	1–0	1–1	0–0	3–1	3–0	1–1	2–1		2–0	0–0	2–0
Wisła Kraków	1–0	1–1	2–0	2–1	1–2	2–0	2–1	2–0	0–0	0–1	0–3		2–0	3–1
Zagłębie Sosnowiec	0–0	0–1	2–0	1–1	1–4	4–1	1–1	2–0	2–0	0–1	4–1	2–0		1–0
Zagłębie Wałbrzych	0–2	1–1	1–0	1–1	0–0	0–0	2–1	5–0	2–1	1–0	2–0	0–1	0–3	

Source: 90minut.pl (in Polish)
Legend: Blue = home team win; Yellow = draw; Red = away team win.

== Relegation playoffs ==
At the end of the first and second division season, the play-off was played between:

- the 13th placed team in the I liga and the 4th team in the II liga
- the 14th placed team in the I liga and the 3rd team in the II liga

Team 1	Agg.	Team 2	1st leg	2nd leg
Polonia Bytom	1–0	GKS Katowice	0–0	1–0
Odra Opole	2–0	Hutnik Kraków	0–0	2–0

== Top goalscorers ==
Rank	Player	Club	Goals
1	(Poland) Grzegorz Lato	Stal Mielec	13
2	(Poland) Ryszard Sarnat	Wisła Kraków	12
2	(Poland) Kazimierz Kmiecik	Wisła Kraków	12
4	(Poland) Andrzej Jarosik	Zagłębie Sosnowiec	11
4	(Poland) Andrzej Szarmach	Górnik Zabrze	10
6	(Poland) Robert Gadocha	Legia Warsaw	9
6	(Poland) Jan Benigier	Ruch Chorzów	9
6	(Poland) Ryszard Szymczak	Gwardia Warsaw	9
6	(Poland) Jan Małkiewicz	Gwardia Warsaw	9
10	(Poland) Kazimierz Deyna	Legia Warsaw	8
10	(Poland) Tadeusz Pawłowski	Zagłębie Wałbrzych	8
10	(Poland) Witold Karaś	Stal Mielec	8

== Attendances ==
No.	Club	Average	Highest
1	Lech Poznań	44,615	60,000
2	ŁKS	28,846	40,000
3	Pogoń Szczecin	15,692	35,000
4	Ruch Chorzów	15,231	35,000
5	Wisła Kraków	14,846	37,000
6	Stal Mielec	13,462	20,000
7	Legia Warszawa	13,462	25,000
8	Górnik Zabrze	12,462	22,000
9	ROW	10,615	20,000
10	Zagłębie Wałbrzych	9,115	15,000
11	Polonia Bytom	9,038	20,000
12	Zagłębie Sosnowiec	7,538	15,000
13	Odra Opole	7,308	15,000
14	Gwardia Warszawa	4,731	10,000

== Bibliography ==
- Gowarzewski, Andrzej (2000). Encyklopedia Piłkarska Fuji. Liga Polska. O tytuł mistrza Polski 1920–2000 (in Polish). GiA, Katowice. ISBN 83-88232-02-9.
