= Witold Karaś =

Polish footballer

Personal information
- Full name: Witold Józef Karaś
- Date of birth: 20 October 1951 (age 75)
- Place of birth: Nisko, Poland
- Position: Forward

Senior career*
Years	Team	Apps	(Gls)
1964–1969	Zenit Nisko		
1969–1980	Stal Mielec	298	(32)
1980–1982	Salzburger AK		

International career
1974	Poland	2	(0)

Managerial career
- 1982: Stal Mielec
- Radomyślanka Radomyśl Wielki
- 1993: Stal Mielec
- 2000: Stal Mielec
- * Club domestic league appearances and goals

Witold Józef Karaś (born 20 October 1951) is a Polish former professional football manager and player who played as a forward.

== Career ==
Karaś started his career with Zenit Nisko in 1964, and played two matches for the Poland national team – both against Haiti in 1974. After leaving Nisko, he played for Stal Mielec in the Ekstraklasa and then had a stint in Austria. He managed Stal Mielec for two spells.

On 14 July 2007, he won the Polish Junior Championships (Polish: Mistrzostwo Polski Juniorów Młodszych) as a coach of Stal Mielec.

== Career statistics ==
Scores and results table. Poland's goal tally first:

#	Date	Place	Opponent	Result	Competition
1	13 April 1974	Port-au-Prince, Haiti	Haiti	1–2	Friendly
2	15 April 1974	Port-au-Prince, Haiti	Haiti	3–1	Friendly
