= Zenon Kasztelan =

Polish footballer

Personal information
- Date of birth: 16 November 1946 (age 79)
- Place of birth: Szczecin, Poland
- Height: 1.80 m (5 ft 11 in)
- Position: Midfielder

Youth career
- Pogoń Szczecin

Senior career*
Years	Team	Apps	(Gls)
1965–1966	Zawisza Bydgoszcz	3	(0)
1966–1978	Pogoń Szczecin	291	(48)
1978–1980	Admira Wacker		
1980–1982	Pogoń Szczecin		
2007	Pogoń Szczecin		

International career
1973	Poland	6	(1)
- * Club domestic league appearances and goals

Zenon Kasztelan (born 16 November 1946) is a Polish former professional footballer who played as a midfielder.

He made six appearances and scored one goal for the Poland national team in 1973.
