= ŁKS Łódź =

Sports club in Poland

ŁKS
- Full name: Łódzki Klub Sportowy S.A.
- Nickname: Rycerze Wiosny (Knights of Spring)
- Founded: 1908; 118 years ago
- Ground: Władysław Król Municipal Stadium
- Capacity: 18,033
- Owner(s): Dariusz Melon (66.94%); Tomasz Salski (23.73%); Other shareholders (9.33%)
- Chairman: Marcin Janicki
- Manager: Grzegorz Szoka
- League: I liga
- 2025–26: I liga, 5th of 18
- Website: lkslodz.pl
Home colours	Away colours

ŁKS Łódź (Łódzki Klub Sportowy Łódź; Polish pronunciation: [ˌɛwkaˈɛs ˈwut͡ɕ]) is a Polish sports club based in Łódź. They are best known for their football club but are represented in many sports such as basketball, volleyball, boxing, and in the past ice hockey, athletics, tennis, table tennis, swimming, cycling, fencing, chess, etc. The club is based at Władysław Król Municipal Stadium, at Aleja Unii Lubelskiej 2 in the West of Łódź.

This article focuses on the football club. Their nickname "Rycerze Wiosny" ("Knights of Spring") was given to them due to their usually strong performances after the winter break in the league.

== History ==
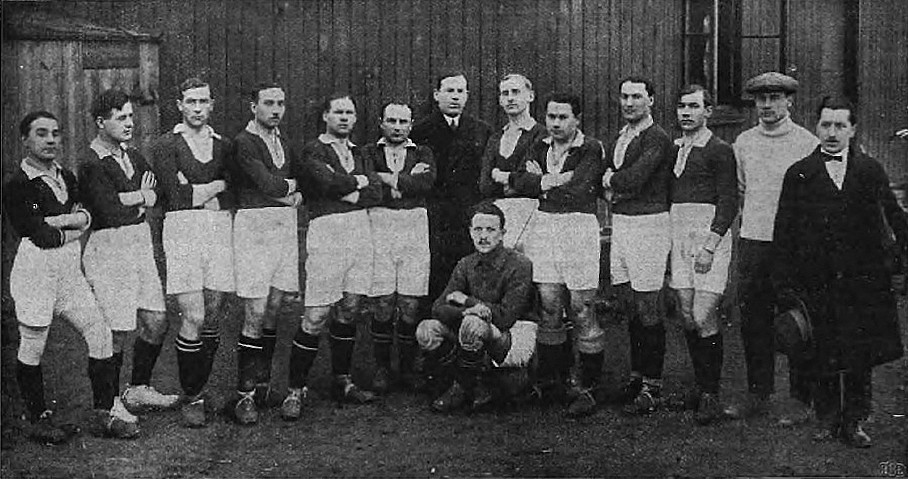
1925 ŁKS side

The club was founded in 1908. It was one of the founders of the Ekstraklasa, Poland's top division.

During World War II, two pre-war players of ŁKS, Adam Obrubański and Alojzy Welnitz, were among Poles murdered by the Russians in the large Katyn massacre in April–May 1940.

ŁKS enjoyed greatest success in the 1950s and 1990s, when it reached the podium six times, including winning the championship title in 1958 and 1997–98. It also won the Polish Cup in 1957, and reached the final in 1994.

In March 2010, the city government sold the football team to a private investor, as the city could no longer afford to support the football team, particularly after several seasons in the top level Ekstraklasa, where expenses often exceeded the ticket revenue from the club's small seating-capacity stadium.

In May 2013, at the conclusion of the second-tier 2012–13 I liga season, the private investor declared bankruptcy. The club survived when a partnership between fans and other local investors raised the necessary funds to enter the much more affordable amateur fifth-level IV liga in time for the 2013–14 IV liga season, competing against other local area teams in the Łódź group. The rebuilt club returned to the top division in 2019.

On 28 May 2023, ŁKS secured promotion to Ekstraklasa after a 1–1 draw against Arka Gdynia; this result also confirmed ŁKS as I liga champions. However, they were relegated to the second division after just one season back in the top flight.

== Facilities ==
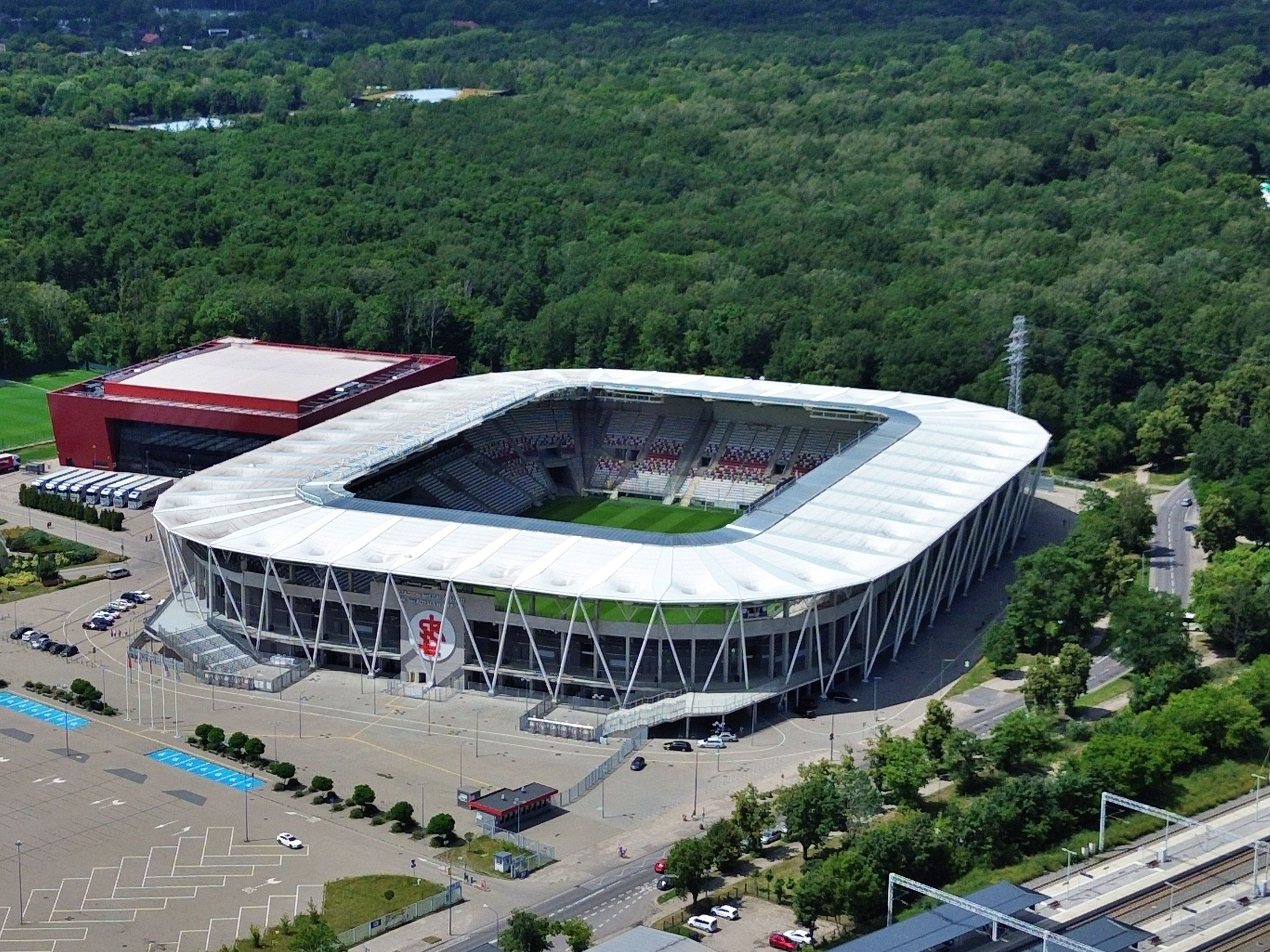
Władysław Król Municipal Stadium

In 2009 the new Atlas Arena was completed adjacent to the football stadium. It is an indoor arena and has already hosted international events in basketball, volleyball and boxing.

The City council, owner of the various ŁKS Łódź sports clubs, still intend to construct a brand new stadium on the site of the current football stadium. It was intended to be complete in time for UEFA Euro 2012, but now is expected to be finished in late 2013-early 2014. Although Łódź is not a Euro 2012 host city, it had been believed that a failure by Ukraine to be ready on time would lead to Poland hosting the entire tournament on its own and therefore requiring more host cities. There were four Polish host cities (Warsaw, Gdańsk, Poznań and Wrocław) involved in hosting the tournament. It was envisioned the new stadium would have approximately 34,000 seats, as required by UEFA. While the concept of a new stadium for ŁKS Łódź was being discussed in 2009, cross-town rival Widzew Łódź announced that they would not contribute to any such stadium, as they had imminent plans to renovate their own stadium (the Widzew Łódź plans were stalled for years, eventually opening the 18,000 seat Widzew Łódź Stadium in 2017). Support for the project was undermined by the successful re-call of the Łódź city president in early 2010. The city also announced a public auction for their stake in the club as they could no longer afford to cover the clubs losses. Owing to financial constraints and lack of demand from LKS fans, the conceptual plan for a new ŁKS Łódź stadium was scaled down to 16,500 in 2012.

As part of renovations, a new 3,000 seat arena was supposed to be built to complement the existing Atlas Arena. All work was expected to cost 218 million PLN.

All plans to provide the club with new facilities, however, were abandoned as of 2013, due to financial constraints and the bankruptcy of the club in May 2013. However, with an upturn in the clubs fortunes, a new stadium is currently being built. One side was used during the 2019–20 Ekstraklasa season with the remainder of the ground set to be completed by 2021.

== Rivalries ==
The club has a fierce rivalry with cross-town club Widzew Łódź, with the derby match between the two clubs being intense both on and off the field. See Łódź derby.

== Honours ==
=== League ===
- Ekstraklasa
  - Champions: 1958, 1997–98
  - Runners-up: 1954
  - Third place: 1922, 1957, 1992–93
- I liga
  - Champions: 2010–11, 2022–23

=== Cup ===
- Polish Cup
  - Winners: 1956–57
  - Runners-up: 1993–94
- Polish Super Cup
  - Runners-up: 1994, 1998

=== Youth teams ===
- Polish U19 championship
  - Champions: 1962, 1983, 1999
  - Runners-up: 1953, 1955, 1973, 2002
  - Third place: 1971, 1981
- Polish U17 championship
  - Champions: 1994, 1999

== Players ==
=== Current squad ===
As of 15 September 2026

Note: Flags indicate national team as defined under FIFA eligibility rules; some limited exceptions apply. Players may hold more than one non-FIFA nationality.

No.	Pos.	Nation	Player
1	GK	POL	Łukasz Bomba
3	DF	POL	Krzysztof Fałowski
4	DF	POL	Bartosz Farbiszewski
5	DF	POL	Łukasz Wiech
6	DF	POL	Sebastian Rudol (captain)
7	DF	POL	Dominik Sokół
8	MF	JPN	Koki Hinokio
9	FW	ESP	Andreu Arasa
10	MF	POL	Igor Strzałek
11	DF	POL	Marcel Błachewicz
12	GK	POL	Mikołaj Ćwikliński
13	FW	POL	Karol Podliński
14	MF	POL	Szymon Frakowski
17	FW	POL	Kacper Prusiński
19	MF	POL	Kacper Nowakowski (on loan from Raków Częstochowa)

No.	Pos.	Nation	Player
20	MF	POL	Mateusz Wysokiński
21	MF	POL	Mateusz Kupczak
22	DF	MDA	Artur Crăciun
27	MF	UKR	Serhiy Krykun
28	MF	POL	Michał Kaput
32	FW	POL	Fabian Olejniczak
33	MF	POL	Lenard Szczygieł
34	MF	POL	Sebastian Sopel
37	DF	AUT	Julian Keiblinger
38	DF	POL	Szymon Karasiński (on loan from Zagłębie Lubin)
40	GK	CAN	James Rhodes
77	GK	POL	Damian Węglarz
88	MF	POL	Kacper Terlecki
—	MF	POL	Eryk Łukaszka

=== Other players under contract ===
Note: Flags indicate national team as defined under FIFA eligibility rules; some limited exceptions apply. Players may hold more than one non-FIFA nationality.

No.	Pos.	Nation	Player
99	FW	POL	Fabian Piasecki

=== Out on loan ===
Note: Flags indicate national team as defined under FIFA eligibility rules; some limited exceptions apply. Players may hold more than one non-FIFA nationality.

No.	Pos.	Nation	Player
15	MF	POL	Antoni Młynarczyk (at Warta Poznań until 30 June 2027)
26	DF	POL	Mateusz Książek (at Sokół Kleczew until 30 June 2027)

No.	Pos.	Nation	Player
—	GK	POL	Łukasz Jakubowski (at Avia Świdnik until 30 June 2027)

=== Notable former players ===
- (Poland) Jan Tomaszewski
- (Poland) Kazimierz Deyna
- (Poland) Marek Dziuba
- (Poland) Tomasz Cebula
- (Poland) Tomasz Wieszczycki
- (Poland) Marek Chojnacki
- (Poland) Witold Bendkowski
- (Poland) Tomasz Kłos
- (Brazil) Paulinho
- (Poland) Igor Sypniewski
- (Poland) Marek Saganowski
- (Poland) Adam Grad
- (Poland) Zbigniew Robakiewicz
- (Poland) Rafał Niżnik
- (Poland) Stanisław Terlecki
- (Nigeria) Darlington Omodiagbe
- (Poland) Maciej Terlecki
- (Bosnia and Herzegovina) Ensar Arifovic
- (Poland) Bogusław Wyparło
- (Poland) Robert Kozielski
- (Poland) Jacek Ziober
- (Poland) Łukasz Madej
- (Poland) Mirosław Trzeciak

== League history ==
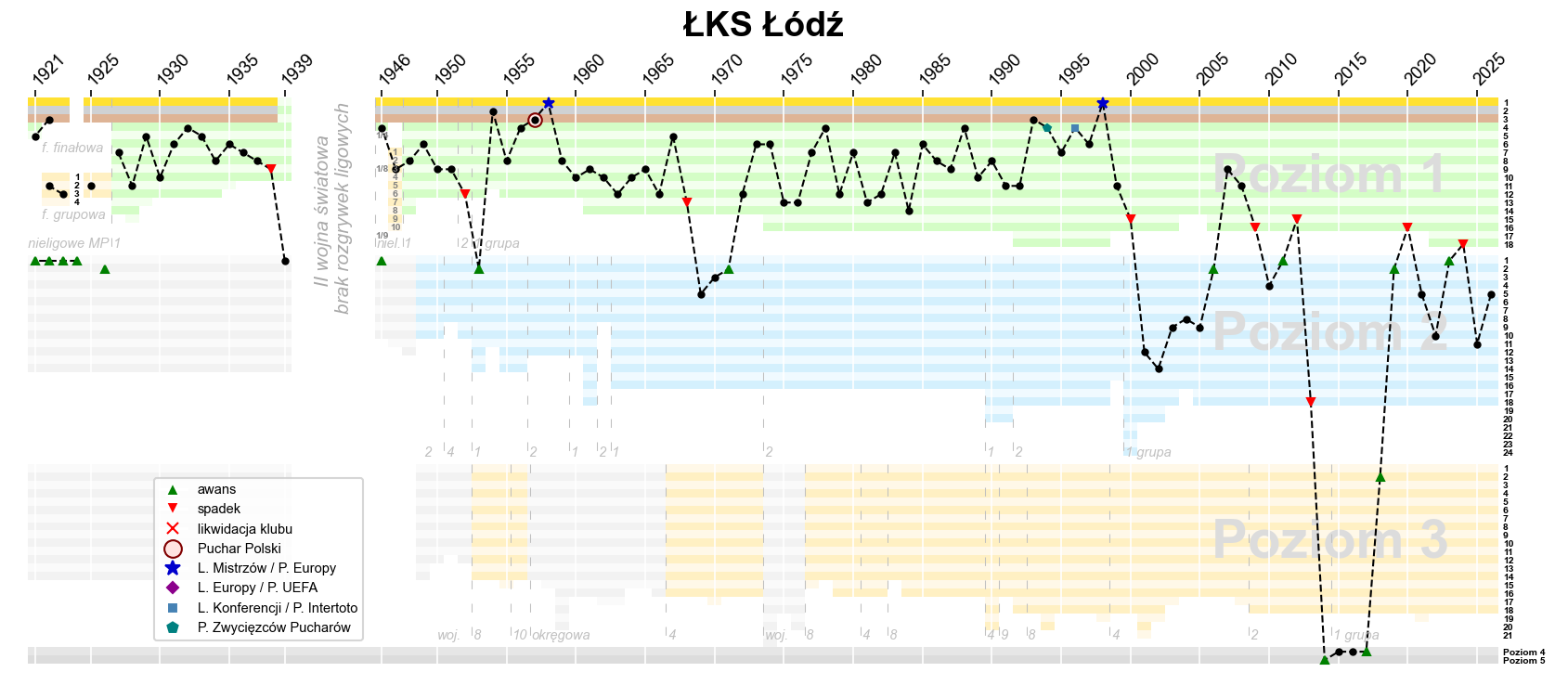
Chart of yearly table positions of ŁKS in the Polish league system

Tier	Seasons	First	Last	Promotions	Relegations	Most consecutive seasons
Ekstraklasa (tier 1)	67	1927	2023–24	▲4 times to Europe	▼8	29 (1971–2000)
Second tier	20	1939	2025–26	▲6	▼1	6 (2000–2006)
Third tier	1	2017–18	2017–18	▲1	never	1
Fourth tier	3	2014–15	2016–17	▲1	never	3 (2014–2017)
Fifth tier	1	2013–14	2013–14	▲1	never	1

== ŁKS in Europe ==
Season	Competition	Round	Opponent	Home	Away	Aggregate
1959–60	European Cup	Q	(Luxembourg) Jeunesse Esch	2–1	0–5	2–6
1994–95	UEFA Cup Winners' Cup	1R	(Portugal) Porto	0–1	0–2	0–3
1996	UEFA Intertoto Cup	GR	(Russia) KAMAZ	—N/a	0–3	4th
1996	UEFA Intertoto Cup	GR	(Bulgaria) Spartak Varna	1–1	—N/a	4th
1996	UEFA Intertoto Cup	GR	(Germany) 1860 Munich	—N/a	0–5	4th
1996	UEFA Intertoto Cup	GR	(Czech Republic) Kaučuk Opava	0–3	—N/a	4th
1998–99	UEFA Champions League	1Q	(Azerbaijan) Kapaz	4–1	3–1	7–2
1998–99	UEFA Champions League	2Q	(England) Manchester United	0–0	0–2	0–2
1998–99	UEFA Cup	1R	(France) Monaco	1–3	0–0	1–3

== Managers ==
- (Hungary) Lajos Czeizler (1923–26)
- (Hungary) Lajos Czeizler (1935–36)
- (Poland) Władysław Król (1949)
- (Poland) Jan Wiszniowski (1950)
- (Poland) Edward Drabiński (1950–51)
- (Poland) Artur Woźniak (1951)
- (Poland) Władysław Król (1952–59)
- (Poland) Kazimierz Radwański (1960)
- (Poland) Stanisław Baran (1961)
- (Poland) Władysław Król
- (Poland) Tadeusz Foryś (1965)
- (Poland) Longin Janeczek (1966–67)
- (Poland) Wacław Pegza (1968)
- (Poland) Józef Walczak (1971–72)
- (Poland) Paweł Kowalski (1972)
- (Poland) Kazimierz Górski (1973)
- (Poland) Grzegorz Polakow (1975)
- (Poland) Longin Janeczek (1976)
- (Poland) Leszek Jezierski (1976–78)
- (Poland) Zygmunt Małolepszy (1978)
- (Poland) Józef Walczak (1980)
- (Poland) Wojciech Łazarek (1991)
- (Poland) Ryszard Polak (1991–95)
- (Poland) Zbigniew Lepczyk (1995)
- (Poland) Marek Dziuba (1996–99)
- (Poland) Adam Topolski (2000)
- (Poland) Włodzimierz Gąsior (2002)
- (Poland) Bogusław Pietrzak (2002–03)
- (Poland) Włodzimierz Tylak (2003)
- (Poland) Wojciech Borecki (2003–04)
- (Poland) Marek Chojnacki (2004)
- (Poland) Wiesław Wojno (2005–06)
- (Poland) Jerzy Kasalik (2006)
- (Poland) Marek Chojnacki (2006–07)
- (Poland) Wojciech Borecki (2007)
- (Poland) Mirosław Jabłoński (2007–08)
- (Poland) Marek Chojnacki (2008)
- (Poland) Grzegorz Wesołowski (2008–10)
- (Poland) Andrzej Pyrdoł (2010–11)
- (Poland) Dariusz Bratkowski (2011)
- (Poland) Michał Probierz (2011)
- (Poland) Tomasz Wieszczycki (caretaker) (2011)
- (Poland) Ryszard Tarasiewicz (2011–12)
- (Poland) Andrzej Pyrdoł (2012)
- (Poland) Marek Chojnacki (2012)
- (Poland) Maciej Szpak (2013)
- (Poland) Piotr Zajączkowski (2013)
- (Poland) Wojciech Robaszek (2013–2014)
- (Poland) Andrzej Kretek (2014)
- (Poland) Marek Chojnacki (2014–2015)
- (Poland) Robert Szwarc (2015–2016)
- (Poland) Wojciech Robaszek (2016)
- (Poland) Marcin Pyrdoł (2016–17)
- (Poland) Wojciech Robaszek (2017–18)
- (Poland) Kazimierz Moskal (2018–20)
- (Poland) Wojciech Stawowy (2020–21)
- (Poland) Ireneusz Mamrot (2021)
- (Spain) Kibu Vicuña (2021–22)
- (Poland) Marcin Pogorzała (caretaker) (2022)
- (Poland) Kazimierz Moskal (2022–23)
- (Poland) Piotr Stokowiec (2023–24)
- (Poland) Marcin Matysiak (2024)
- (Poland) Jakub Dziółka (2024–25)
- (Paraguay) Ariel Galeano (2025)
- (Poland) Ryszard Robakiewicz (interim) (2025)
- (Poland) Szymon Grabowski (2025)
- (Poland) Grzegorz Szoka (2025–present)

== ŁKS Łódź II ==
As of the 2026–27 season, the club's reserve team competes in the III liga, having been relegated from the 2025–26 II liga.

== ŁKS Łódź III ==
The club also operates a third team, which was established in 2019. It currently plays in the IV liga Łódź, the fifth tier of the league pyramid.

== See also ==
- ŁKS Łódź (women's basketball)
- Football in Poland
- List of football teams
- UEFA Champions League
- UEFA Cup
