= 1975–76 Ekstraklasa =

50th season of top-tier football league in Poland

I liga
- Season: 1975–76
- Dates: 2 August 1975 – 2 June 1976
- Champions: Stal Mielec (2nd title)
- Relegated: Stal Rzeszów; Polonia Bytom
- European Cup: Stal Mielec
- Cup Winners' Cup: Śląsk Wrocław
- UEFA Cup: GKS Tychy; Wisła Kraków
- Matches: 240
- Goals: 560 (2.33 per match)
- Top goalscorer: Kazimierz Kmiecik (20 goals)
- Biggest home win: Wisła 8–0 Lech
- Biggest away win: Lech 0–4 Pogoń
- Highest scoring: Wisła 8–0 Lech
- Highest attendance: 40,000
- Total attendance: 3,319,920
- Average attendance: 13,833 ▲0.1%

The 1975–76 I liga was the 50th season of the Polish Football Championship and the 42nd season of the I liga, the top Polish professional league for association football clubs, since its establishment in 1927. The league was operated by the Polish Football Association (PZPN).

The champions were Stal Mielec, who won their 2nd Polish title.

== Competition modus ==
The season started on 2 August 1975 and concluded on 2 June 1976 (autumn-spring league). The season was played as a round-robin tournament. The team at the top of the standings won the league title. A total of 16 teams participated, 14 of which competed in the league during the 1974–75 season, while the remaining two were promoted from the 1974–75 II liga. Each team played a total of 30 matches, half at home and half away, two games against each other team. Teams received two points for a win and one point for a draw.

== League table ==
Pos	Team	Pld	W	D	L	GF	GA	GD	Pts	Qualification or relegation
1	Stal Mielec (C)	30	13	12	5	45	23	+22	38	Qualification to European Cup first round
2	GKS Tychy	30	15	8	7	38	34	+4	38	Qualification to UEFA Cup first round
3	Wisła Kraków	30	15	7	8	39	19	+20	37	Qualification to UEFA Cup first round
4	Ruch Chorzów	30	12	13	5	35	24	+11	37	
5	Widzew Łódź	30	10	12	8	33	33	0	32	
6	Pogoń Szczecin	30	13	5	12	46	42	+4	31	
7	Śląsk Wrocław	30	11	9	10	36	33	+3	31	Qualification to Cup Winners' Cup first round
8	Legia Warsaw	30	12	5	13	44	46	−2	29	
9	Górnik Zabrze	30	10	8	12	38	39	−1	28	
10	Zagłębie Sosnowiec	30	12	4	14	37	38	−1	28	
11	ROW Rybnik	30	11	6	13	30	40	−10	28	
12	Lech Poznań	30	9	9	12	33	46	−13	27	
13	ŁKS Łódź	30	8	10	12	27	33	−6	26	
14	Szombierki Bytom	30	10	5	15	37	42	−5	25	
15	Stal Rzeszów (R)	30	8	8	14	23	35	−12	24	Relegated to II liga
16	Polonia Bytom (R)	30	6	9	15	19	33	−14	21	Relegated to II liga

Source: 90minut.pl (in Polish)
(C) Champions; (R) Relegated

== Results ==
Home \ Away	TYC	GÓR	LPO	LEG	ŁKS	POG	BYT	RYB	RUC	STA	SRZ	SZB	ŚLĄ	WID	WIS	ZSO
GKS Tychy		1–1	0–0	3–2	1–1	2–1	3–0	2–1	0–1	0–2	1–0	3–1	2–1	1–0	2–1	1–2
Górnik Zabrze	0–0		4–2	1–2	1–0	1–0	2–0	3–0	0–0	1–1	0–2	4–1	1–1	2–0	0–2	3–1
Lech Poznań	0–1	1–2		2–3	1–1	0–4	1–0	3–1	1–0	0–0	2–0	2–1	1–1	1–1	3–0	2–1
Legia Warsaw	0–1	1–3	2–0		1–0	4–1	2–0	2–0	1–1	1–1	2–0	3–0	4–0	1–1	1–2	3–0
ŁKS Łódź	0–0	0–0	0–0	2–4		4–0	1–1	1–0	0–1	2–1	3–1	2–1	1–1	1–2	2–0	0–0
Pogoń Szczecin	4–0	4–2	4–2	3–0	1–0		1–1	1–0	2–1	1–3	3–0	3–0	1–1	3–3	1–1	3–1
Polonia Bytom	0–1	4–3	0–3	2–0	1–1	1–0		0–0	0–1	1–0	0–0	0–2	0–1	1–1	0–2	3–0
ROW Rybnik	1–3	1–0	1–0	3–2	2–0	2–0	1–0		0–0	2–5	1–0	0–2	0–0	2–1	1–3	1–0
Ruch Chorzów	3–2	3–0	1–1	3–2	1–0	1–1	1–1	0–1		2–1	0–0	1–1	1–2	0–0	1–1	2–1
Stal Mielec	0–0	2–1	3–1	6–0	2–2	2–0	0–0	1–1	0–0		1–0	2–1	0–0	3–0	1–1	2–0
Stal Rzeszów	2–2	1–1	1–0	1–0	0–1	3–0	2–2	1–1	1–3	2–1		0–0	0–2	1–1	0–1	1–0
Szombierki Bytom	0–2	3–1	0–0	6–0	2–0	3–1	1–0	3–2	0–2	1–2	2–1		1–3	3–1	0–0	1–1
Śląsk Wrocław	3–1	3–1	2–3	0–0	0–1	2–0	1–0	2–2	2–4	0–1	0–1	2–1		1–2	1–0	4–2
Widzew Łódź	1–1	0–0	1–1	2–1	3–0	0–2	1–0	3–1	1–1	1–0	2–0	1–0	0–0		0–1	3–0
Wisła Kraków	5–0	1–0	8–0	2–0	2–0	0–1	0–1	2–0	0–0	1–1	0–1	1–0	1–0	0–0		1–0
Zagłębie Sosnowiec	1–2	2–0	3–0	0–0	3–1	2–0	1–0	0–2	2–0	1–1	3–1	2–0	1–0	5–1	2–0	

Source: 90minut.pl (in Polish)
Legend: Blue = home team win; Yellow = draw; Red = away team win.

== Top goalscorers ==
Rank	Player	Club	Goals
1	(Poland) Kazimierz Kmiecik	Wisła Kraków	20
2	(Poland) Andrzej Szarmach	Górnik Zabrze	16
3	(Poland) Roman Ogaza	GKS Tychy	15
4	(Poland) Grzegorz Lato	Stal Mielec	14
5	(Poland) Bronisław Bula	Ruch Chorzów	11
5	(Poland) Kazimierz Deyna	Legia Warsaw	11
5	(Poland) Tadeusz Pawłowski	Śląsk Wrocław	11
5	(Poland) Zenon Kasztelan	Pogoń Szczecin	11
5	(Poland) Leszek Wolski	Pogoń Szczecin	11

== Attendances ==
#	Club	Average
1	Pogoń Szczecin	23,667
2	Lech Poznań	22,333
3	Wisła Kraków	21,933
4	Widzew Łódź	17,267
5	ŁKS	16,467
6	Legia Warszawa	16,000
7	Śląsk Wrocław	14,667
8	Stal Mielec	13,467
9	Tychy	13,333
10	Ruch Chorzów	10,700
11	Stal Rzeszów	10,267
12	Górnik Zabrze	9,933
13	Zagłębie Sosnowiec	9,467
14	ROW	8,333
15	Polonia Bytom	7,200
16	Szombierki Bytom	6,300

== Bibliography ==
- Gowarzewski, Andrzej (2000). Encyklopedia Piłkarska Fuji. Liga Polska. O tytuł mistrza Polski 1920–2000 (in Polish). GiA, Katowice. ISBN 83-88232-02-9.
