= Stal Mielec =

Coordinates: 50°17′55″N 21°26′9″E

- Full name: FKS Stal Mielec
- Nickname: Biało-niebiescy (White-blues)
- Founded: 10 April 1939; 87 years ago
- Ground: Stal Mielec Stadium
- Capacity: 7,000
- Chairman: Paweł Mrozik
- Manager: Damian Skiba
- League: I liga
- 2025–26: I liga, 14th of 18
- Website: stalmielec.com
Home colours	Away colours	Third colours

FKS Stal Mielec, commonly known as Stal Mielec (Polish pronunciation: [ˈstal ˈmjɛlɛt͡s]), is a Polish professional football club based in Mielec. The team competes in the I liga, the second level of the Polish football league system.

The club was established on 10 April 1939. Historically, the club has enjoyed great success within Poland's top division, winning the title in 1973 and 1976, but had undergone significant management changes and financial difficulties within the past two decades, which prevented the club from participation in the Poland's top league. After finishing first in the I liga in 2020, Stal Mielec was promoted to the Ekstraklasa for the first time since the 1995–96 season, where it remained until 2025.

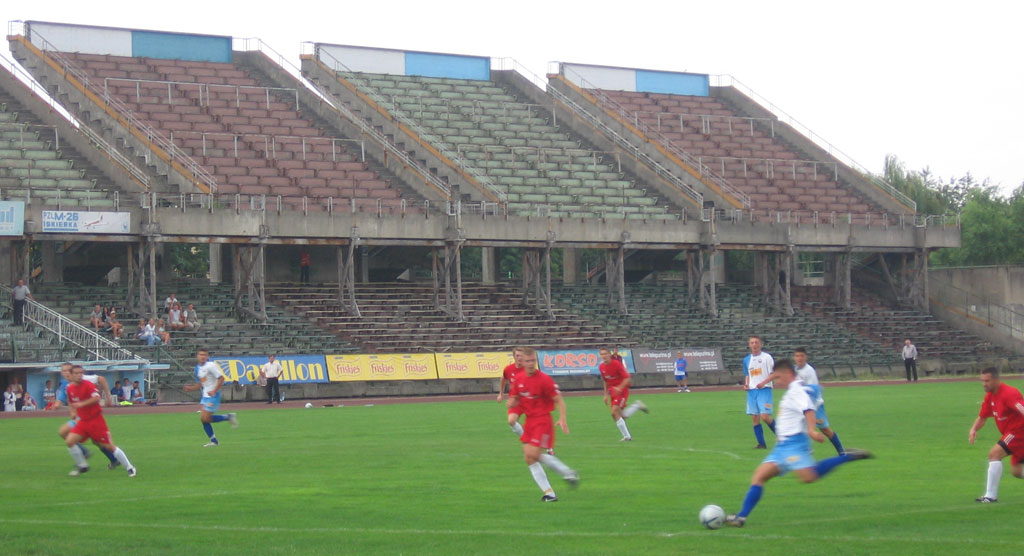
Stadion Stali Mielec old ground

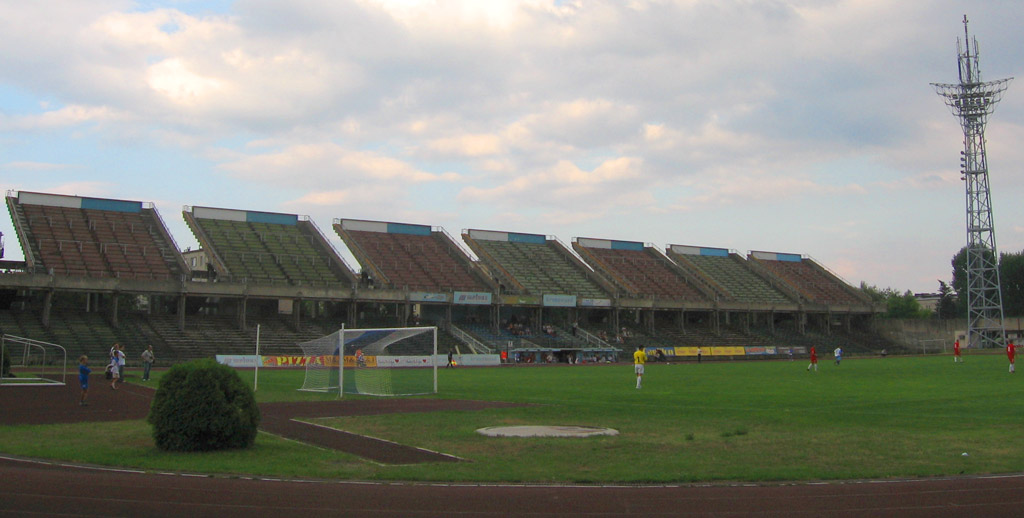
Stadion Stali Mielec

== History ==
=== Naming history ===
- 1939 – Klub Sportowy PZL Mielec
- 1946 – Robotniczy Klub Sportowy PZL Zryw Mielec
- 1948 – Związkowy Klub Sportowy Metalowców PZL Mielec
- 1949 – Związkowy Klub Sportowy Stal Mielec
- 1950 – Koło Sportowe Stal przy Wytwórni Sprzętu Komunikacyjnego Mielec
- 1957 – Fabryczny Klub Sportowy Stal Mielec
- 1977 – Fabryczny Klub Sportowy PZL Stal Mielec
- 1995 – Autonomiczna Sekcja Piłki Nożnej FKS PZL Stal Mielec
- 1997 – Mielecki Klub Piłkarski Stal Mielec
- 1998 – Mielecki Klub Piłkarski Lobo Stal Mielec
- 1999 – Mielecki Klub Piłkarski Stal Mielec
- 2002 – Klub Sportowy Stal Mielec
- 2003 – FKS Stal Mielec
- 2018 – PGE FKS Stal Mielec
- 2024 – FKS Stal Mielec

=== 1939–1945 – the beginning and interwar period ===
The football club was one of the first two (next to the volleyball club) at the PZL Mielec, established in 1939. The team was made up of players playing in other clubs in Mielec and employees of the PZL, an aerospace company. In the first match played, the team defeated the Gymnastic Society "Sokół" Mielec 4–1. Three more matches were played against Dzikovia Tarnobrzeg (2–1), Metal Tarnów (3–1) and a team made up of players from an ammunition factory in Nowa Dęba (6–1). A match against Okęcie Warsaw planned for September did not take place, because World War II started and all sports games were forbidden. However, the matches were played illegally in the meadows beyond the communal forest and in other towns (including Dębica, Kolbuszowa, Sandomierz). The only official match was played against a German military unit and ended with the score 1–2.

== Honours ==
=== League ===
- Ekstraklasa
  - Champions: 1972–73, 1975–76
  - Runners-up: 1974–75
- I liga
  - Champions: 1960, 1984–85, 1987–88
- II liga
  - Champions: 1955, 1968–69, 2015–16
- III liga
  - Champions: 2012–13 (group Lublin–Subcarpathia)
- V liga
  - Champions: 1998–99
- Klasa A
  - Champions: 1950, 1954
- Klasa B
  - Champions: 1949

=== Cup ===
- Polish Cup
  - Runners-up: 1975–76

=== Europe ===
- European Cup
  - First round: 1973–74, 1976–77
- UEFA Cup
  - Quarter-finalists: 1975–76
  - First round: 1979–80, 1982–83

=== Youth teams ===
- Polish U-19 Championship
  - Runners-up: 1964, 2007
- Polish U-17 Championship
  - Champions: 2007
  - Runners-up: 1996, 2012

== Stadium ==
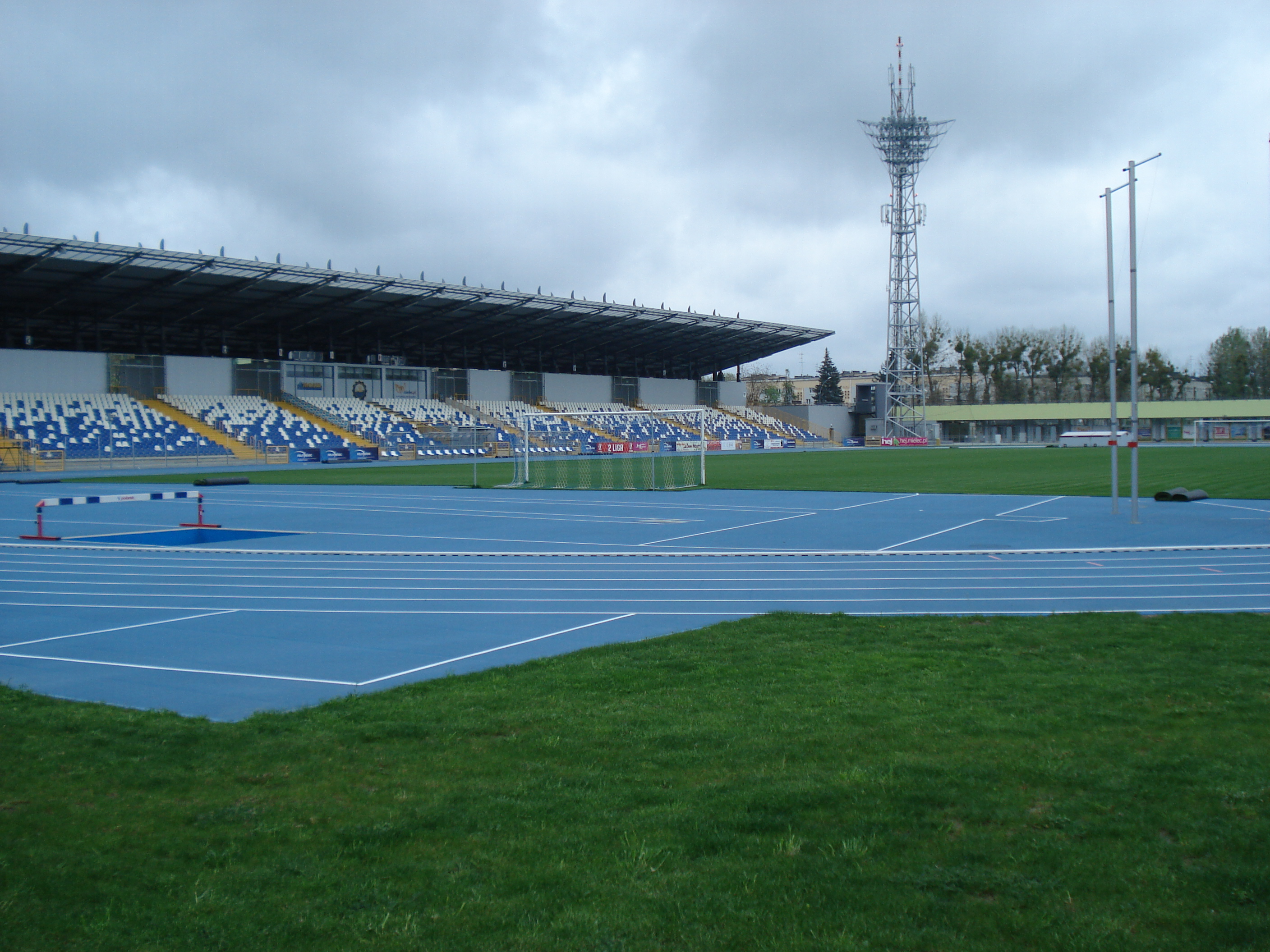
Stadion Stali Mielec new ground

The construction of the club's current stadium, Stadion Stali Mielec (patroned by Grzegorz Lato), was concluded in 1953. The stadium underwent a major renovation, completed in 2013. It maintains a seating capacity for 7,000 spectators. Before the 2013 renovation, it maintained seating capacity for 30,000 spectators, and hosted numerous European Champions Cup, UEFA Cup, and Poland national team matches, including FIFA World Cup and UEFA European Championship qualifiers.

== Individual player awards ==
- Ekstraklasa top goalscorer
  - 1973 - Grzegorz Lato - 13 goals
  - 1975 - Grzegorz Lato - 19 goals
  - 1995 - Bogusław Cygan - 16 goals
- Piłka nożna magazine plebiscite
  - Player of the Year
    - 1976 - Henryk Kasperczak
    - 1977 - Grzegorz Lato
  - Newcomer of the Year
    - 1975 - Zbigniew Hnatio
    - 1978 - Włodzimierz Ciołek
- Przegląd Sportowy Polish Athlete of the Year
  - 1974 - 4th place - Grzegorz Lato
  - 1977 - 5th place - Grzegorz Lato
- Sport Player of the Year
  - 1974 - Grzegorz Lato
  - 1976 - Henryk Kasperczak
  - 1977 - Grzegorz Lato
- Tempo Goalkeeper of the Year
  - 1979 - Zygmunt Kukla

== Reserves ==
Stal Mielec II
- League: Regional league Dębica
- 2025–26: Regional league Dębica, 4th of 16
- Website: stalmielec.com

The club operates a reserve team which currently plays in the Dębica group of the regional league, the sixth of the league pyramid. During the 2020–21 season, a third team participated in the regional league, as well as the Subcarpathian Rzeszów–Dębica Polish Cup edition.

== Players ==
=== Current squad ===
As of 8 November 2026

Note: Flags indicate national team as defined under FIFA eligibility rules; some limited exceptions apply. Players may hold more than one non-FIFA nationality.

No.	Pos.	Nation	Player
2	DF	POL	Bartłomiej Kukułowicz
5	DF	POL	Hubert Matynia
6	MF	POL	Kacper Sommerfeld
7	MF	POL	Marcin Cebula
8	MF	POL	Natan Niedźwiedź
10	MF	POL	Maciej Domański (captain)
11	FW	POL	Kamil Odolak
14	DF	POL	Kamil Kościelny
16	MF	POL	Nikodem Szady
18	DF	POL	Piotr Wlazło (vice-captain)
19	MF	POL	Tymoteusz Gmur (on loan from Lech Poznań)
20	FW	POL	Emil Ziobroń
23	DF	POL	Krystian Getinger (3rd captain)
26	DF	POL	Michał Stala
29	DF	POL	Paweł Tupaj

No.	Pos.	Nation	Player
30	MF	POL	Jakub Małek
31	GK	BLR	Anton Chichkan
32	MF	POL	Fryderyk Gerbowski
38	DF	POL	Michael Wyparło
41	GK	POL	Piotr Chrapusta
44	DF	ESP	Israel Puerto (4th captain)
47	MF	FRA	Siméon Ouré
70	FW	POL	Sebastian Musiolik
77	FW	POL	Kacper Sadłocha
78	MF	POL	Kamil Cybulski (on loan from Widzew Łódź)
88	MF	POL	Patryk Prajsnar (on loan from Lech Poznań II)
90	MF	POL	Paweł Kruszelnicki
94	DF	POL	Bartosz Kwiecień
99	GK	POL	Maciej Gostomski

=== Out on loan ===
Note: Flags indicate national team as defined under FIFA eligibility rules; some limited exceptions apply. Players may hold more than one non-FIFA nationality.

No.	Pos.	Nation	Player
3	DF	POL	Piotr Kowalik (at Sandecja Nowy Sącz until 30 June 2027)
—	MF	POL	David Zięba (at Czarni Połaniec until 30 June 2027)

=== Notable players ===
The players below played for their respective countries at any point during their career.

Notable Polish players

- (Poland) Jan Domarski
- (Poland) Michał Gliwa
- (Poland) Witold Karaś
- (Poland) Henryk Kasperczak, former coach of Wisła Kraków and Kavala
- (Poland) Damian Kądzior
- (Poland) Dariusz Kubicki
- (Poland) Zygmunt Kukla
- (Poland) Grzegorz Lato, Golden Shoe winner of the 1974 World Cup with 7 goals; former President of the Polish Football Association
- (Poland) Radosław Majecki
- (Poland) Andrzej Szarmach
- (Poland) Bogusław Wyparło
- (Poland) Michał Żyro

Notable foreign players

- (Bosnia and Herzegovina) Said Hamulić
- (Bulgaria) Bozhidar Chorbadzhiyski
- (Estonia) Bogdan Vaštšuk
- (Finland) Petteri Forsell
- (Finland) Albin Granlund
- (Finland) Kai Meriluoto
- (Estonia) Rauno Sappinen
- (Kyrgyzstan) Edgar Bernhardt
- (Latvia) Alvis Jaunzems
- (Lithuania) Dominykas Barauskas
- (Malta) Matthew Guillaumier
- (Portugal) Ivan Cavaleiro
- (Slovakia) Martin Dobrotka

== Managers ==
- (Poland) Stanisław Maurer (1947–1948)
- (Poland) Rudolf Pirych (1948–1952)
- (Poland) Eustachy Poticha (1952–1953)
- (Poland) Antoni Brzeżańczyk (1954–1956)
- (Poland) Michał Matyas (1957–1958)
- (Poland) Antoni Brzeżańczyk (1959–1960)
- (Poland) Henryk Skromny (1961)
- (Poland) Czesław Suszczyk (1962)
- (Poland) Michał Matyas (1962–1963)
- (Poland) Stanisław Malczyk (1963–1964)
- (Poland) Otton Opiełka (1964)
- (Poland) Władysław Lemiszko (1964–1965)
- (Poland) Konrad Jędryka (1966–1967)
- (Poland) Andrzej Gajewski (1968–1972)
- (Hungary) Károly Kontha (1973)
- (Poland) Aleksander Brożyniak (1973–1974)
- (Poland) Zenon Książek (1974–1975)
- (Poland) Edmund Zientara (1975–1977)
- (Poland) Alfred Gazda (1977)
- (Poland) Konstanty Pawlikaniec (1977–1978)
- (Poland) Zenon Książek (1978–1980)
- (Poland) Mieczysław Kruk (1980–1981)
- (Poland) Józef Walczak (1981–1982)
- (Poland) Witold Karaś (1982)
- (Poland) Jacek Machciński and Marian Kosiński (1982–1983)
- (Poland) Henryk Stroniarz (1983–1984)
- (Poland) Włodzimierz Gąsior (1984–1985)
- (Poland) Ryszard Latawiec (1985–1986)
- (Poland) Zenon Książek (1986–1987)
- (Poland) Włodzimierz Gąsior (1987–1990)
- (Poland) Marian Kosiński (1990)
- (Poland) Włodzimierz Gąsior (1990–1991)
- (Poland) Grzegorz Lato (1991–1993)
- (Poland) Witold Karaś (1993)
- (Poland) Franciszek Smuda (1993–1995)
- (Poland) Jan Złomańczuk (1995)
- (Poland) Grzegorz Lato (1996–1997)
- (Poland) Jerzy Płaneta (1998)
- (Poland) Marek Chamielec (1999)
- (Poland) Jerzy Płaneta (1999–2000)
- (Poland) Witold Karaś (2000)
- (Poland) Roman Gruszecki (2000–2001)
- (Poland) Włodzimierz Gąsior (2001)
- (Poland) Marek Lorenc (2001)
- (Poland) Krzysztof Łętocha (2001–2002)
- (Poland) Jacek Klisiewicz (2002)
- (Poland) Włodzimierz Gąsior (2003–2006)
- (Poland) Tomasz Tułacz (2006)
- (Poland) Włodzimierz Gąsior (2006–2007)
- (Poland) Janusz Białek (2007)
- (Poland) Zbigniew Hariasz (2007)
- (Poland) Andrzej Jaskot (2008)
- (Poland) Grzegorz Wcisło (2008–2009)
- (Poland) Zbigniew Hariasz (2009)
- (Poland) Janusz Białek (2009)
- (Poland) Zbigniew Hariasz (2009–2010)
- (Poland) Grzegorz Wcisło (2010)
- (Poland) Mariusz Łuc (2010)
- (Poland) Tomasz Tułacz (2011–2012)
- (Poland) Roman Gruszecki (2012)
- (Poland) Włodzimierz Gąsior (2012–2014)
- (Poland) Rafał Wójcik (2014)
- (Poland) Janusz Białek (2014)
- (Poland) Rafał Wójcik (2014)
- (Poland) Janusz Białek (2014–2016)
- (Poland) Maciej Serafiński (2016)
- (Poland) Zbigniew Smółka (2016–2018)
- (Poland) Artur Skowronek (2018–2019)
- (Poland) Dariusz Marzec (2019–2020)
- (Poland) Dariusz Skrzypczak (2020)
- (Poland) Leszek Ojrzyński (2020–2021)
- (Poland) Włodzimierz Gąsior (2021)
- (Poland) Adam Majewski (2021–2023)
- (Poland) Kamil Kiereś (2023–2024)
- (Poland) Janusz Niedźwiedź (2024–2025)
- (Serbia) Ivan Đurđević (2025)
- (Poland) Ireneusz Mamrot (2025–2026)
- (Poland) Damian Skiba (2026–present)

== See also ==
- Football in Poland
- List of football teams
- Champions' Cup/League
- UEFA Cup
