= Sławomir Adamus =

Polish footballer and coach

Personal information
- Date of birth: July 6, 1961 (age 65)
- Place of birth: Jędrzejów, Poland
- Height: 1.86 m (6 ft 1 in)
- Position: Defender

Senior career*
Years	Team	Apps	(Gls)
1983–1984	Naprzód Jędrzejów		
1984–1988	Korona Kielce		
1988–1993	Stal Stalowa Wola		
1993–1994	Błękitni Kielce		
1994–1997	KSZO Ostrowiec Świętokrzyski		
1998	Błękitni Kielce		
1998–1999	Stal Stalowa Wola		
1999–2001	Pogoń 1945 Staszów		
2001	Stal Stalowa Wola		

Managerial career
- 2003: Stal Stalowa Wola
- 2004–2007: Stal Stalowa Wola
- 2007–2008: Ruch Wysokie Mazowieckie
- 2008–2009: Łada Biłgoraj
- 2009–2010: Stal Kraśnik
- 2010–2011: Stal Stalowa Wola
- * Club domestic league appearances and goals

Sławomir Adamus (born 6 July 1961) is a Polish former footballer and current football coach.

Adamus began his career with Naprzód Jędrzejów, his hometown club. He also played for Korona Kielce, Błękitni Kielce, Stal Stalowa Wola, and KSZO Ostrowiec Świętokrzyski, amassing 30 appearances in the Ekstraklasa with Stal Stalowa Wola and KSZO Ostrowiec Świętokrzyski. He retired from playing in 2001 and transitioned into coaching after completing the coaching school led by Ryszard Kulesza. He holds a Polish Football Association coaching license, qualifying him to manage teams at the Ekstraklasa level.

Initially, Adamus served as an assistant to Czesław Palik at Stal Stalowa Wola. After the team's relegation to the third tier in the 2002–03 season, he became head coach. He was sacked in September 2003 but returned as head coach in the summer of 2004, leading the team until March 2007. During this period, he guided Stal Stalowa Wola to promotion to the second tier.

After leaving Stal Stalowa Wola, Adamus coached Ruch Wysokie Mazowieckie from June 2007 to April 2008. Despite leading the team to the top of the league table and being close to promotion to the newly formed Unibet I Liga, he was unexpectedly sacked. In the 2008–09 season, he managed Łada Biłgoraj in the third tier, followed by Stal Kraśnik from July 2009 to May 2010. On 30 June 2010, he returned to manage Stal Stalowa Wola.

== Personal life ==
Sławomir Adamus was born on 6 July 1961 in Jędrzejów, Poland. He is married to Maria, and they have a daughter named Patrycja.

In 2005, Adamus was one of 20 candidates shortlisted by the official KSZO Ostrowiec Świętokrzyski website, kszo.info, for the best defender in the club's history. Rafał Lasocki won the poll, with Benedykt Nocoń and Mariusz Jop finishing second and third, respectively.

== Playing career ==
=== Korona Kielce (1983–1988) ===
Adamus started his football career with Naprzód Jędrzejów, competing in the 1983–84 fourth tier. In 1984, he joined Korona Kielce, which entered the 1984–85 season with a revamped squad. The team included new signings like Krzysztof Wojtowicz from Motor Lublin, Stanisław Wesołowski from Zenit Chmielnik, Tomasz Tokarczyk from Ruch Skarżysko, and goalkeeper Piotr Gil as a backup to Stanisław Goska. Korona drew 0–0 with Polonia Warsaw in their opening match, but losses to Polonia Bytom (1–4) and Avia Świdnik (0–2) left them second-last after three rounds. A 2–1 win over Stal Rzeszów marked a turning point. After 11 rounds, Korona climbed to sixth place but finished the autumn round in 12th.

In the following season, Korona finished ninth, and in the 1986–87 season, they placed 13th, resulting in relegation. Despite a chance to stay in the second tier through a playoff against Broń Radom, Korona drew 2–2 at home and 1–1 away, with Broń advancing due to the away goals rule. After relegation, several key players left, but Adamus remained alongside goalkeeper Tadeusz Miś, Stanisław Wesołowski, Leszek Borycki, Leszek Wójcik, and Marek Czyżkowski. The team was later bolstered by youth players. In the 1987–88 season, Korona competed for promotion against GKS Górnik Łęczna, both teams earning 48 points over 26 matches, but Górnik secured promotion due to a better goal difference. That season, Korona also played their first official derby matches against Stadion Kielce. In the summer of 1988, Adamus signed with Stal Stalowa Wola.

=== Stal Stalowa Wola (1988–1993) ===
In the 1987–88 season, Stal Stalowa Wola made their Ekstraklasa debut but were relegated after finishing last. Over the next two years, they were a top team in the second tier, winning the 1990–91 season to earn promotion. Adamus was a key player, retaining his spot in the starting lineup after promotion and appearing in 29 matches. Despite ambitions, Stal were relegated from the Ekstraklasa, finishing just three points behind Olimpia Poznań, who avoided relegation. They also reached the quarter-finals of the Polish Cup, their best achievement, losing to Stilon Gorzów Wielkopolski over two legs.

=== KSZO Ostrowiec Świętokrzyski (1994–1997) ===
In 1994, Adamus signed with KSZO Ostrowiec Świętokrzyski, a third-tier club. They achieved promotion to the second tier in 1995 under coach Janusz Batugowski, defeating GKS Górnik Łęczna in a decisive match, though the victory was marred by a match-fixing controversy that was never proven. Despite nearly being relegated in the 1995–96 season, KSZO finished second in the 1996–97 season, earning their first-ever promotion to the Ekstraklasa. Their top-flight stint lasted only one season, finishing 17th. Adamus left during the winter break, playing just one match in the 1997–98 season – a 4–5 loss to Górnik Zabrze, where he played the full 90 minutes and Mirosław Budka scored a hat-trick.

=== Later career (1998–2001) ===
After leaving KSZO, Adamus rejoined Błękitni Kielce for the 1997–98 season. The club was dissolved in 2000, and its players transferred to the newly formed Kielecki Klub Piłkarski Korona Kielce, which competed in the third tier. Adamus, however, left in 1998 to rejoin Stal Stalowa Wola, which was pushing for first-tier promotion. In 1999, he signed with Pogoń 1945 Staszów, and in the autumn of the 2001–02 season, he returned to Stal Stalowa Wola.

== Coaching career ==
=== Stal Stalowa Wola (2002–2007) ===
Adamus graduated from Ryszard Kulesza's coaching school and began working with Stal Stalowa Wola's youth teams in 1997. After retiring, he became assistant coach under Czesław Palik. In the 2002–03 season, Stal finished 14th and were relegated to the third tier. Following Palik's departure to KSZO Ostrowiec Świętokrzyski, Adamus was appointed head coach on 26 June 2003, beating out candidates like Janusz Batugowski, Ryszard Kuźma, Stanisław Gielarek, and Włodzimierz Gąsior. He debuted in July with a 1–0 Polish Cup win over Sandecja Nowy Sącz, thanks to a goal by Dariusz Michalak.

=== Ruch Wysokie Mazowieckie and Łada Biłgoraj (2007–2009) ===
Before the 2007–08 season, Adamus took over as coach of Ruch Wysokie Mazowieckie. His team led the league and was close to promotion to the second tier, but he was sacked in April 2008 after a 1–3 loss to Dolcan Ząbki. He cited interference from club officials, including changes to training schedules, as a key reason for his departure.

In July 2008, Adamus became coach of Łada Biłgoraj, a relegated third-tier club that remained in the division due to a league restructuring by the Polish Football Association in 2007. Łada struggled, earning 23 points over 30 matches and finishing last, resulting in relegation to the fourth tier. A lack of players, with only five or six available for training, forced Adamus to rely on juniors, and the departure of three Ukrainian players further weakened the squad. He left the club after the season, replaced by Ireneusz Zarczuk.

=== Stal Kraśnik and Stal Stalowa Wola (2009–2011) ===
After leaving Łada, Adamus was considered for the Stal Stalowa Wola coaching role but received no offer. He briefly accepted a position at Stal Poniatowa but left after finding the promised players unavailable. He then joined Stal Kraśnik, replacing Wojciech Stopa. He was sacked in May 2010 due to poor results, including no wins in the spring round. Adamus cited limited influence, a thin squad, and last-minute transfers as challenges. His successor, Dariusz Matysiak, also struggled, and Stal Kraśnik finished 14th, relegated to the fourth tier.

In June 2010, Adamus was announced as Stal Stalowa Wola's new coach after their relegation to the second tier, officially taking over on 30 June when Janusz Białek's contract expired. He was sacked on 28 November 2011.
