= 2024–25 Stal Stalowa Wola season =

Stal Stalowa Wola
2024–25 season
- Manager: Ireneusz Pietrzykowski, Marcin Płuska
- Stadium: Subcarpathian Football Center
- I liga: 18th
- Polish Cup: First round
Home colours	Away colours

The 2024–25 season was the 81st season in the history of Stal Stalowa Wola, and the club's first consecutive season in I liga. In addition to the domestic league, the team participated in the Polish Cup.

== Transfers ==
=== In ===
Pos.	Player	Transferred from	Date	Source
FW	(Poland) Jakub Górski	(Poland) Korona Kielce	12 July 2024	
DF	(Poland) Dominik Jończy	(Poland) Zagłębie Sosnowiec	25 July 2024	
DF	(Poland) Borys Freilich	(Poland) Pogoń Szczecin	27 July 2024	
GK	(Poland) Miłosz Piekutowski	(Poland) Jagiellonia Białystok (loan)	7 January 2025	

== Friendlies ==
=== Pre-season ===
13 July 2024 Friendly	Termalica Nieciecza (Poland)	2–0	(Poland) Stal Stalowa Wola	Nieciecza
11:00	Karasek 10'; Wacławek 45'			Stadium: boczne boisko Bruk-Betu Termaliki

13 July 2024 Friendly	Stal Stalowa Wola (Poland)	3–0	(Poland) Broń Radom	Stalowa Wola
17:00				Stadium: boczne boisko stadionu PCPN

== Competitions ==
=== Overall record ===
Competition	First match	Last match	Starting round	Record							
Competition	First match	Last match	Starting round	Pld	W	D	L	GF	GA	GD	Win %
I liga	20 July 2024	25 May 2025	Matchday 1	34	4	11	19	27	65	−38	11.76
Polish Cup	7 August 2024	25 September 2024	Preliminary round	2	1	1	0	6	4	+2	50.00
Total				36	5	12	19	33	69	−36	13.89

Source: Soccerway

=== I liga ===
==== League table ====
Pos	Team	Pld	W	D	L	GF	GA	GD	Pts	Promotion or Relegation
14	Odra Opole	34	7	9	18	31	61	−30	30 (Note: Ranked based on head-to-head points: Odra Opole 6 pts, Pogoń Siedlce 0 pts.)	
15	Pogoń Siedlce	34	7	9	18	38	53	−15	30	
16	Kotwica Kołobrzeg (Note: MKP Kotwica were denied a license to compete in the 2025–26 II liga. Then they ceased its activities and was not registered at any league level in the following season. At the same time, MKS Kotwica appeared in the regional league, but it is a different legal entity, even though supporters refer to it as the continuation of the club’s traditions.) (R)	34	6	11	17	29	55	−26	29	Relegation, then dissolution
17	Warta Poznań (R)	34	6	6	22	22	56	−34	24	Relegation to II liga
18	Stal Stalowa Wola (R)	34	4	11	19	27	65	−38	23	Relegation to II liga

Source: 1liga.org, 90minut.pl
Rules for classification: 1) Points; 2) Head-to-head points; 3) Head-to-head goal difference; 4) Goal difference; 6) Goals scored; 7) Number of wins; 8) Number of away wins.
(Note: Head-to-head record is used only after all the matches between the teams in question have been played)
(R) Relegated
Notes:

Semi-finals; 29 May 2025
3	Wisła Płock	2
6	Polonia Warsaw	1
4	Wisła Kraków	0
5	Miedź Legnica	1

Final; 1 June 2025
3	Wisła Płock	2
5	Miedź Legnica	0

==== Results summary ====
Overall								Home						Away					
Pld	W	D	L	GF	GA	GD	Pts	W	D	L	GF	GA	GD	W	D	L	GF	GA	GD
4	0	0	4	2	8	−6	0	0	0	2	0	3	−3	0	0	2	2	5	−3

Last updated: 10 August 2024.

==== Results by round ====
Round	1	2	3	4
Ground	H	A	H	A
Result	L	L	L	L
Position	14	16	18	18

Updated to match(es) played on 10 August 2024. Source:
A = Away; H = Home; W = Win; D = Draw; L = Loss

==== Matches ====
The match schedule was released on 12 June 2024.

20 July 2024 1	Stal Stalowa Wola	0–1	Górnik Łęczna	Stalowa Wola
19:35 UTC+2	Soszyński (yellow card) 26'; Furtak (yellow card) 61'		Warchoł 90+5'; Spáčil (yellow card) 90+7'	Stadium: Subcarpathian Football Center; Referee: Piotr Szypuła

26 July 2024 2	Miedź Legnica	4–2	Stal Stalowa Wola	Legnica
18:00	Bogacz 7', 18'; Kaczmarski 38', 61'		Jończy 75'; Górski 80'	Stadium: White Eagle Stadium; Referee: Grzegorz Kawałko

3 August 2024 3	Stal Stalowa Wola	0–2	Kotwica Kołobrzeg	Stalowa Wola
14:30 UTC+2			Jonathan 38'; Bykowski 90+3'	Stadium: Subcarpathian Football Center; Referee: Mateusz Jenda

10 August 2024 4	Warta Poznań	1–0	Stal Stalowa Wola	Grodzisk Wielkopolski
17:00	Adamski 8' (pen.), (penalty missed) 56'			Stadium: Dyskobolia Stadium; Referee: Sebastian Krasny

16 August 2024 5	Stal Stalowa Wola	1–1	Chrobry Głogów	Stalowa Wola
18:00 UTC+2	Szymon Lewkot 27'	90minut	Patryk Mucha 14'	Stadium: Subcarpathian Football Center; Attendance: 2705; Referee: Albert Różycki (Łódź)

21 August 2024 6	Odra Opole	2–1	Stal Stalowa Wola	Opole
20:30 UTC+2	Jiří Piroch 54'; Adrian Łyszczarz 67'; Jakub Szrek (yellow card); Adrian Purzycki (yellow card)	90minut	Dominik Jończy 35'; Łukasz Furtak (yellow card); Łukasz Soszyński (yellow card) (red card)	Stadium: Opole Stadium; Attendance: 1976; Referee: Tomasz Wajda (Żywiec)

=== Polish Cup ===
7 August 2024 Preliminary round	Stal Stalowa Wola	4–2	Olimpia Elbląg	Stalowa Wola
17:00 UTC+2	Pchełka 4'; Łącki 8'; Svec 21'; Jończy (red card) 60'; Wojtkowski 66'		Kordykiewicz 45+1'; Kuzimski 61'	Stadium: Subcarpathian Football Center; Attendance: 1,971; Referee: Maciej Kuropatwa

25 September 2024 First round	Stal Stalowa Wola	2–2 (a.e.t.) (2–3 p)	Arka Gdynia	Stalowa Wola
19:00 CEST (UTC+02:00)	Švec 15'; Tavares 116'	Report	Czubak 80'; Navarro 109'	Stadium: Subcarpathian Football Center; Attendance: 1,950; Referee: Jacek Małyszek (Lublin)
	Penalties
	Kukułowicz (penalty missed); Soszyński (penalty missed); Zaucha (penalty scored); Tavares (penalty missed); Furtak (penalty scored)		(penalty scored) Marcjanik; (penalty missed) Rzuchowski; (penalty scored) Navarro; (penalty missed) Kocaba; (penalty scored) Oliveira
