= Andreja Prokić =

Serbian footballer

Personal information
- Date of birth: 9 April 1989 (age 37)
- Place of birth: Kragujevac, Serbia
- Height: 1.78 m (5 ft 10 in)
- Position: Forward

Team information
- Current team: JKS Jarosław
- Number: 11

Senior career*
Years	Team	Apps	(Gls)
- Karađorđe Topola
2009–2010	Turbina Vreoci		
2010–2013	Stal Rzeszów	89	(24)
2013–2015	GKS Bełchatów	39	(2)
2015–2016	Stal Mielec	32	(12)
2016–2018	GKS Katowice	59	(11)
2018–2021	Stal Mielec	93	(10)
2021–2025	Stal Rzeszów	128	(28)
2025–	JKS Jarosław	34	(9)
- * Club domestic league appearances and goals as of 21:25, 25 June 2026 (UTC)

Andreja Prokić (born 9 April 1989) is a Serbian professional footballer who plays as a forward for III liga club JKS Jarosław.

== Career ==
As a youth player, Prokić trialed for Partizan as well as Red Star Belgrade, one of the most successful Serbian clubs.

In 2010, Prokić signed for Stal Rzeszów in the Polish third division from Serbian lower league side Turbina Vreoci.

In 2018, Prokić moved to Stal Mielec in the Polish second division.

Ahead of the 2025–26 season, Prokić joined fifth tier side JKS Jarosław and began his coaching career at the Diamonds Rzeszów Football Academy.

== Personal life ==
In March 2018, Prokić received Polish citizenship.

== Honours ==
GKS Bełchatów

- I liga: 2013–14

Stal Mielec

- I liga: 2019–20
- II liga: 2015–16

Stal Rzeszów

- II liga: 2021–22

JKS Jarosław

- IV liga Subcarpathia: 2025–26
