= Arkadiusz Baran =

Polish footballer (born 1979)

Personal information
- Full name: Arkadiusz Baran
- Date of birth: 9 November 1979 (age 46)
- Place of birth: Jarosław, Poland
- Height: 1.85 m (6 ft 1 in)
- Position: Midfielder

Team information
- Current team: Legion Pilzno (manager)

Youth career
- JKS 1909 Jarosław

Senior career*
Years	Team	Apps	(Gls)
1998–2002	Stal Rzeszów		
2002	→ Polonia Przemyśl (loan)		
2003–2010	Cracovia	180	(4)
2010–2012	Termalica Bruk-Bet	55	(0)
2012–2016	Stal Rzeszów	112	(2)
2017–2018	Iskra Zgłobień	1	(0)
2018	Crasnovia Krasne	17	(0)
2019–2020	Polonia Rzeszów	0	(0)

Managerial career
- 2017: JKS 1909 Jarosław
- 2018: Crasnovia Krasne (player-manager)
- 2020–2022: JKS Jarosław
- 2022–2023: Sokół Sieniawa
- 2024–2025: Sokół Sieniawa
- 2026–: Legion Pilzno
- * Club domestic league appearances and goals

Arkadiusz Baran (born 9 November 1979) is a Polish professional football manager and former player who is currently in charge of IV liga Subcarpathia club Legion Pilzno. He is the older brother of fellow footballer and manager Grzegorz Baran.

== Career ==
A defensive midfielder, Baran spent most his career with Cracovia. He had also played for such teams as JKS 1909 Jarosław, Polonia Przemyśl and Stal Rzeszów before joining the Kraków side.

== Honours ==
Stal Rzeszów

- III liga Lublin–Subcarpathia: 2014–15
- Polish Cup (Rzeszów–Dębica regionals): 2015–16, 2016–17
