= Roman Miroshnyk =

Ukrainian footballer (born 1994)

Personal information
- Full name: Roman Mykolayovych Miroshnyk
- Date of birth: 3 January 1994 (age 32)
- Place of birth: Luhansk, Ukraine
- Height: 1.81 m (5 ft 11 1/2 in)
- Position: Defender

Team information
- Current team: JKS Jarosław
- Number: 33

Youth career
- 2007–2010: LVUFK Luhansk

Senior career*
Years	Team	Apps	(Gls)
2011–2012	Stal Alchevsk	12	(0)
2012–2015	Metalurh Donetsk	0	(0)
2015–2020	Avanhard Kramatorsk	97	(8)
2019	Avanhard-2 Kramatorsk	6	(0)
2020–2023	Veres Rivne	47	(1)
2023	Panevėžys	22	(0)
2024–2025	Podhale Nowy Targ	45	(3)
2025–	JKS Jarosław	29	(5)

International career
2010	Ukraine U16	9	(0)
2010–2011	Ukraine U17	10	(1)
2011–2012	Ukraine U18	12	(0)
2012–2013	Ukraine U19	9	(0)
2014	Ukraine U20	1	(0)
- * Club domestic league appearances and goals as of 21:22, 25 June 2026 (UTC)

Roman Mykolayovych Miroshnyk (Ukrainian: Роман Миколайович Мірошник; born 3 January 1994) is a Ukrainian professional footballer who plays as a defender for III liga club JKS Jarosław.

== Honours ==
Panevėžys

- A Lyga: 2023

Podhale Nowy Targ

- Polish Cup (Lesser Poland regionals): 2023–24

JKS Jarosław

- IV liga Subcarpathia: 2025–26
