= Ihor Hatala =

Ukrainian footballer

Personal information
- Full name: Ihor Tarasovych Hatala
- Date of birth: 18 June 1998 (age 28)
- Place of birth: Bila, Ternopil Oblast, Ukraine
- Height: 1.76 m (5 ft 9 in)
- Position: Left winger

Team information
- Current team: KS Wiązownica
- Number: 7

Youth career
- 2011–2013: Ternopil
- 2013: DYuSSh-2 Ternopil
- 2013–2014: UFK-Karpaty Lviv
- 2014–2015: Skala Morshyn
- 2014: → Skala-2 Morshyn

Senior career*
Years	Team	Apps	(Gls)
2015	KAM Burdyakivtsi	0	(0)
2016	Ahron-OTH Velyki Hai	18	(8)
2017–2025	Nyva Ternopil	159	(14)
2025–	KS Wiązownica	12	(0)
2025–	→ Wisłoczanka Tryńcza	7	(4)
- * Club domestic league appearances and goals as of 21:20, 20 June 2025 (UTC)

Ihor Tarasovych Hatala (Ukrainian: Ігор Тарасович Гатала; born 18 June 1998) is a Ukrainian professional footballer who plays as a left winger for Polish IV liga Subcarpathia club KS Wiązownica.

== Honours ==
Wisłoczanka Tryńcza

- Regional league Jarosław: 2024–25
