= 2023–24 Stal Stalowa Wola season =

Polish II liga football season

Stal Stalowa Wola
2023–24 season
- Stadium: Podkarpackie Centrum Piłki Nożnej
- II liga: 4th place (promoted via playoffs)
- Polish Cup: 1/16
- All statistics correct as of 9 July 2023.

After the return of Stal Stalowa Wola in 2023, the 2023–24 season was the club's first season in the II liga.

== Season's progress ==
=== The summer preparation period ===
Stal started preparations for the new season on June 29. 32 players took part in the training. Assistant coach Aleksander Adamus and physical preparation coach Paweł Żmuda joined the team. Maciej Jarosz remained the second coach and Dienis Parechin the goalkeeper coach.

During the summer period, the players of the Stal became the following: Kacper Chełmecki (from KS Wiązownica), Łukasz Furtak (from Raków II Częstochowa), Dominik Kościelniak (from GKS Katowice), Dominik Maługa (formerly at Avia Świdnik), Michał Mydlarz (formerly at Avia Świdnik), Łukasz Seweryn (formerly at Resovia) and Bartosz Wiktoruk (formerly at Jagiellonia II Białystok). On July 17, 2023, Stal confirmed the moves for Olivier Sukiennicki from Raków Częstochowa and Hugo Leyka from Grom Różaniec.

In the same period, Sławomir Duda (to Star Starachowice), Arkadij Filipczuk, Michał Furman, Szymon Grabarz, Mateusz Hudzik, Łukasz Konefał, Paweł Kucharczyk, Jakub Lebioda, Bartłomiej Olszewski, Wiktor Stępniowski and Filip Szifer left the club.

Date	Opponent	Stadium	Result	Scorers for Stal	Source
PRESEASON FRIENDLY MATCHES
5 July 2023	Stal Rzeszów	Podkarpackie Centrum Piłki Nożnej (side pitch)	0:7	–	"Stal Stalowa Wola 0-7 Stal Rzeszów". www.90minut.pl. 2023-07-05.
8 July 2023	Broń Radom	Podkarpackie Centrum Piłki Nożnej (side pitch)	5:1	Kōsei Iwao 12', 42', 74', Dominik Maluga 38', Jakub Banach 90' (pen.)	"Stal Stalowa Wola 5-1 Broń Radom". www.90minut.pl.
8 July 2023	Star Starachowice	Podkarpackie Centrum Piłki Nożnej (side pitch)	2:1	Łukasz Seweryn 53', Dominik Kościelniak 62'	
15 July 2023	Resovia	Podkarpackie Centrum Piłki Nożnej (side pitch)	4:5	Jakub Kowalski 34' (pen.), Mariusz Szuszkiewicz 36', Adam Imiela 60', Igor Fedejko 69'	"Stal Stalowa Wola 4-5 Resovia". www.90minut.pl.

== II liga matches ==
Round	Date	Match	Result	Scorers for Stal	Spectators	Annotations
MATCHES IN 2023
1	22.07	GKS Jastrzębie - Stal Stalowa Wola	0:0		1.679	
2	29.07	Pogoń Siedlce - Stal Stalowa Wola	2:0		747	
3	05/06.08	Wisła Puławy - Stal Stalowa Wola	1:1	Piotr Rogala 54'	725	The host of the game was changed on 29 June 2023.
4	13.08	ŁKS Łódź II- Stal Stalowa Wola	3:0		330	Played at the Władysław Król Municipal Stadium.
5	19.08	Stal Stalowa Wola - Chojniczanka Chojnice	5:2	Adam Imiela 20', Jakub Kowalski 43' (pen.), 90' (pen.), Piotr Rogala 47', Lucjan Klisiewicz 83'	2.300	
6	26.08	Stal Stalowa Wola - Stomil Olsztyn	0:1		2.800	
7	02.09	KKS 1925 Kalisz - Stal Stalowa Wola	1:0		1.703	
8	10.09	Stal Stalowa Wola - Hutnik Kraków	2:1	Adam Imiela 34', Lucjan Klisiewicz 75'	2.350	
9	16.09	Sandecja Nowy Sącz - Stal Stalowa Wola	2:0		204	
10	24.09	Stal Stalowa Wola - Polonia Bytom	1:0	Lucjan Klisiewicz 59' (pen.)	2 150	
11	30.09	Olimpia Elbląg - Stal Stalowa Wola	0:0		831	
12	06.10	Stal Stalowa Wola - Lech Poznań II	3:1	Adam Imiela 1', 15', 40'	2 100	
13	18.10	Kotwica Kołobrzeg - Stal Stalowa Wola	1:0		1 120	
14	22.10	Stal Stalowa Wola - Olimpia Grudziądz	2:0	Oskar Sikorski 22' (o.g.), Jacek Górski 33'	1 830	
15	27.10	Skra Częstochowa - Stal Stalowa Wola	1:2	Kacper Chełmecki 18', Piotr Rogala 59'	0	
16	04/05.11	Stal Stalowa Wola - Radunia Stężyca	1:2		1 800	
17	11/12.11	Zagłębie Lubin II - Stal Stalowa Wola	4:0		137	
18	18/19.11	Stal Stalowa Wola - GKS Jastrzębie	3:1		1 800	
19	25/26.11	Stal Stalowa Wola - Pogoń Siedlce	2:1		1 215	
20	20.03	Stal Stalowa Wola - Wisła Puławy	2:2		1 350	The host of the game was changed on 29 June 2023.
MATCHES IN 2024
21	24/25.02	Stal Stalowa Wola - ŁKS Łódź II	1:0		1 600	
22	02/03.03	Chojniczanka Chojnice - Stal Stalowa Wola	1:1		782	
23	09/10.03	Stomil Olsztyn - Stal Stalowa Wola	0:1		1 805	
24	16/17.03	Stal Stalowa Wola - KKS 1925 Kalisz	0:1		2 000	
25	23/24.03	Hutnik Kraków - Stal Stalowa Wola	1:1		879	
26	30.03	Stal Stalowa Wola - Sandecja Nowy Sącz	2:1		1 945	
27	06/07.04	Polonia Bytom - Stal Stalowa Wola	4:3		812	
28	13/14.04	Stal Stalowa Wola - Olimpia Elbląg	0:0		1 807	
29	20/21.04	Lech Poznań II - Stal Stalowa Wola	0:0		74	
30	27/28.04	Stal Stalowa Wola - Kotwica Kołobrzeg	1:1		1 864	
31	04/05.05	Olimpia Grudziądz - Stal Stalowa Wola	1:3		532	
32	11/12.05	Stal Stalowa Wola - Skra Częstochowa	3:1		1 974	
33	18/19.05	Radunia Stężyca - Stal Stalowa Wola	0:2		308	
34	25/26.05	Stal Stalowa Wola - Zagłębie Lubin II	2:1		3 764	

== League table ==
Pos	Team	Pld	W	D	L	GF	GA	GD	Pts	Promotion or Relegation
1	Pogoń Siedlce (C, P)	34	16	10	8	57	45	+12	58	Promotion to I liga
2	Kotwica Kołobrzeg (P)	34	16	8	10	61	44	+17	56	Promotion to I liga
3	KKS 1925 Kalisz	34	15	10	9	48	32	+16	55	Qualification for promotion play-offs
4	Stal Stalowa Wola (O, P)	34	15	9	10	44	38	+6	54 (Note: Stal Stalowa Wola finished ahead of Chojniczanka Chojnice on head-to-head points: Stal Stalowa Wola 5–2 Chojniczanka Chojnice, Chojniczanka Chojnice 1–1 Stal Stalowa Wola)	Qualification for promotion play-offs
5	Chojniczanka Chojnice	34	15	9	10	49	44	+5	54	Qualification for promotion play-offs
6	Polonia Bytom	34	14	11	9	57	48	+9	53	Qualification for promotion play-offs
7	Radunia Stężyca	34	13	11	10	48	45	+3	50	
8	Hutnik Kraków	34	13	10	11	47	43	+4	49	
9	Zagłębie Lubin II	34	13	7	14	48	47	+1	46	
10	ŁKS Łódź II	34	12	9	13	46	49	−3	45	
11	GKS Jastrzębie	34	11	10	13	43	48	−5	43	
12	Wisła Puławy	34	9	14	11	48	50	−2	41	
13	Olimpia Elbląg	34	10	10	14	35	46	−11	40 (Note: Olimpia Elbląg finished ahead of Olimpia Grudziądz and Skra Częstochowa on head-to-head points: Olimpia Elbląg 9, Olimpia Grudziądz 5, Skra Częstochowa 2)	
14	Olimpia Grudziądz	34	10	10	14	35	42	−7	40	
15	Skra Częstochowa (R)	34	10	10	14	40	43	−3	40	Relegation to III liga
16	Lech Poznań II (R)	34	10	9	15	34	50	−16	39	Relegation to III liga
17	Sandecja Nowy Sącz (R)	34	9	8	17	34	48	−14	35	Relegation to III liga
18	Stomil Olsztyn (R)	34	9	7	18	30	42	−12	34	Relegation to III liga

Source: 90minut.pl
Rules for classification: 1) Points; 2) Head-to-head points; 3) Head-to-head goal difference; 4) Goal difference; 6) Goals scored; 7) Number of wins; 8) Number of away wins.
(Note: Head-to-head record is used only after all the matches between the teams in question have been played)
(C) Champions; (O) Play-off winner; (P) Promoted; (R) Relegated

== Promotion play-offs ==
II liga play-offs for the 2023–24 season will be played on 29 May and 1 June 2024. The teams who finished in 3rd, 4th, 5th and 6th place are set to compete. The fixtures are determined by final league position – 3rd team of regular season vs 6th team of regular season and 4th team of regular season vs 5th team of regular season. The winner of final match will be promoted to the I liga for the 2024–25 season. All matches will be played in a stadiums of team which occupied higher position in regular season.

Semi-finals; 29 May 2024
3	KKS 1925 Kalisz	1
6	Polonia Bytom	0
4	Stal Stalowa Wola	2
5	Chojniczanka Chojnice	1

Final; 1 June 2024
3	KKS 1925 Kalisz	1
4	Stal Stalowa Wola	2

=== Semi-finals ===
29 May 2024
16:00 CEST

KKS 1925 Kalisz	1–0	Polonia Bytom
Sobol 76'	Łączy nas piłka 90minut

Stadion Miejski, Kalisz
Attendance: 996
Referee: Daniel Stefański (Bydgoszcz)
29 May 2024
18:45 CEST

Stal Stalowa Wola	2–1	Chojniczanka Chojnice
Urban 60'; Pioterczak 90+2'	Łączy nas piłka 90minut	Boczek 90+5'

Podkarpackie Centrum Piłki Nożnej, Stalowa Wola
Attendance: 3,764
Referee: Łukasz Kuźma (Białystok)

=== Final ===
1 June 2024
16:30 CEST

KKS 1925 Kalisz	1–2	Stal Stalowa Wola
Sobol 3'	Łączy nas piłka 90minut	Górski 51' (pen.), 52'

Stadion Miejski, Kalisz
Attendance: 2,436
Referee: Bartosz Frankowski (Toruń)

== Polish Cup matches ==
Round	Date	Match	Result	Scorers	Spectators	Source
I R	27.09.2023	Stal Stalowa Wola - Znicz Pruszków	2:0	Kōsei Iwao 73' (pen.), Lucjan Klisiewicz 90' (pen.)	1 100	"Stal Stalowa Wola pokonała Sokoła Sieniawa w finale wojewódzkim Pucharu Polski" (in Polish). 2023-06-07.
