= Miłosz Piekutowski =

Polish professional footballer (born 2006)

Personal information
- Date of birth: 8 May 2006 (age 20)
- Place of birth: Wysokie Mazowieckie, Poland
- Height: 1.89 m (6 ft 2 in)
- Position: Goalkeeper

Team information
- Current team: Strasbourg
- Number: 12

Youth career
- 2017–2022: AP Jagiellonia Białystok

Senior career*
Years	Team	Apps	(Gls)
2022–2025	Jagiellonia Białystok II	26	(0)
2024–2026	Jagiellonia Białystok	4	(0)
2025	→ Stal Stalowa Wola (loan)	14	(0)
2026–	Strasbourg	0	(0)

International career^{‡}
2021–2022	Poland U16	6	(0)
2022–2023	Poland U17	12	(0)
2023–2024	Poland U18	3	(0)
2024–2025	Poland U19	7	(0)
2026–	Poland U20	3	(0)
- * Club domestic league appearances and goals as of 20:08, 29 May 2026 (UTC) ‡ National team caps and goals as of 21:30, 19 November 2026 (UTC)

Miłosz Piekutowski (born 8 May 2006) is a Polish professional footballer who plays as a goalkeeper for Ligue 1 club Strasbourg.

== Club career ==
=== Youth career ===
He spent his entire youth career in Jagiellonia Białystok's academy.

=== Jagiellonia Białystok ===
On 1 June 2022, his deal with Jagiellonia was extended for further two years. There was also a provision added to his contract allowing it to be prolonged for another twelve months. Piekutowski made his debut for Jagiellonia's reserve team in a 0–1 home loss to Błonianka Błonie on 22 April 2023. His deal was once again prolonged for another two years in July 2024. In December 2024, Ekstraklasa club Motor Lublin expressed interest in signing Piekutowski for €100,000, but had their offer rejected by Jagiellonia.

==== Loan to Stal Stalowa Wola ====
On 7 January 2025, he was loaned to I liga side Stal Stalowa Wola until the end of the 2024–25 season to help in preventing its relegation to II liga.

=== Strasbourg ===
On 6 July 2026, Piekutowski joined Ligue 1 club Strasbourg on a five-year deal, after his contract with Jagiellonia had expired.

== International career ==
Piekutowski was part of Poland's U15, U16, U17, U18 and U19 national teams. During the 2023 UEFA European Under-17 Championship, he made four appearances as Poland reached the semi-finals.

== Career statistics ==
As of match played 4 December 2025

Appearances and goals by club, season and competition
Club	Season	League			Polish Cup		Europe		Other		Total	
Club	Season	Division	Apps	Goals	Apps	Goals	Apps	Goals	Apps	Goals	Apps	Goals
Jagiellonia Białystok II	2022–23	III liga, gr. I	2	0	—		—		—		2	0
Jagiellonia Białystok II	2023–24	III liga, gr. I	12	0	1	0	—		—		13	0
Jagiellonia Białystok II	2024–25	III liga, gr. I	8	0	—		—		—		8	0
Jagiellonia Białystok II	2025–26	III liga, gr. I	4	0	—		—		—		4	0
Jagiellonia Białystok II	Total		26	0	1	0	—		—		27	0
Jagiellonia Białystok	2024–25	Ekstraklasa	0	0	0	0	0	0	—		0	0
Jagiellonia Białystok	2025–26	Ekstraklasa	4	0	2	0	2 (Note: Appearances in UEFA Conference League)	0	—		8	0
Jagiellonia Białystok	Total		4	0	2	0	2	0	—		8	0
Stal Stalowa Wola (loan)	2024–25	I liga	14	0	—		—		—		14	0
Strasbourg	2026–27	Ligue 1	0	0	0	0	—		—		0	0
Career total			44	0	3	0	2	0	0	0	49	0

== Honours ==
Individual

- Ekstraklasa Young Player of the Month: November 2025
