= Jakub Kowalski =

Polish footballer (born 1987)

Personal information
- Full name: Jakub Kowalski
- Date of birth: 9 October 1987 (age 39)
- Place of birth: Żyrardów, Poland
- Height: 1.77 m (5 ft 9 1/2 in)
- Positions: Right winger; right-back

Team information
- Current team: Olimpia Pysznica
- Number: 87

Youth career
- –2005: Żyrardowianka Żyrardów
- 2005–2006: UKS SMS Łódź

Senior career*
Years	Team	Apps	(Gls)
2006–2007	Unia Skierniewice		
2007–2008	Concordia Piotrków Trybunalski		
2008–2009	UKS SMS Łódź	10	(1)
2009–2010	Wigry Suwałki	35	(2)
2010–2011	OKS 1945 Olsztyn	31	(4)
2010–2011	Arka Gdynia	29	(1)
2012–2013	Widzew Łódź	5	(0)
2013	Okocimski KS Brzesko	13	(0)
2013–2015	Ruch Chorzów	41	(4)
2015–2016	Podbeskidzie Bielsko-Biała	32	(1)
2016–2018	GKS Tychy	30	(1)
2018–2019	Ruch Chorzów	36	(2)
2019	Górnik Łęczna	10	(0)
2019–2021	Garbarnia Kraków	61	(12)
2021–2022	Podhale Nowy Targ	32	(0)
2022–2024	Stal Stalowa Wola	72	(15)
2026–	Olimpia Pysznica	1	(0)
- * Club domestic league appearances and goals as of 17:46, 5 April 2026 (UTC)

Jakub Kowalski (born 9 October 1987) is a Polish footballer who plays as a right winger or right-back for regional league club Olimpia Pysznica. He was the sporting director of II liga club Stal Stalowa Wola from 2025 to 2026.

== Club career ==
A graduate of Żyrardowianka Żyrardów. He began his senior career at Unia Skierniewice, subsequently playing for Concordia Piotrków Trybunalski, UKS SMS Łódź, Wigry Suwałki, OKS 1945 Olsztyn, Arka Gdynia, Widzew Łódź, Okocimski KS Brzesko, Ruch Chorzów, Podbeskidzie Bielsko-Biała, GKS Tychy, and Górnik Łęczna. On 28 September 2012, while playing for Widzew, he made his Ekstraklasa debut in a 1-3 away defeat to Polonia Warsaw; Kowalski appeared from the 37th minute.

On 9 July 2019, he joined Garbarnia Kraków. His contract with the club expired at the end of June 2021. On 7 July 2021, he signed a one-year contract with Podhale Nowy Targ.

In July 2022, he joined Stal Stalowa Wola, a club with which he won the regional Polish Cup and the III liga, group IV championship during the 2022–2023 season. Throughout this campaign, he made the most league appearances (31), scored the highest number of goals (13), and registered the greatest number of assists (13) for Stal.

In the 2023–24 season, he participated in 29 league fixtures for Stal, scoring two goals, both of which came in a 5–2 victory over Chojniczanka Chojnice in the fifth match of the season, along with one appearance in the Polish Cup and two matches in the promotion playoffs to the I liga. The season concluded with a 2–0 victory in the playoff final against KKS 1925 Kalisz, securing Stal's promotion. On 18 December 2024, after having played ten matches in the 2024–25 I liga, he announced his retirement, effective at the end of the year.

In March 2026, he returned to playing football on an amateur level, joining Olimpia Pysznica in the regional league.

== Executive career ==
Along with Kowalski's retirement, Stal Stalowa Wola announced he would take up the role of the club's sporting director starting from 1 January 2025. He and Stal agreed to part ways on 21 April 2026.

== Honours ==
Podhale Nowy Targ

- Polish Cup (Podhale regionals): 2021–22

Stal Stalowa Wola

- III liga, group IV: 2022–23
- Polish Cup (Stalowa Wola regionals): 2022–23
