= Grzegorz Baran =

Polish footballer (born 1982)

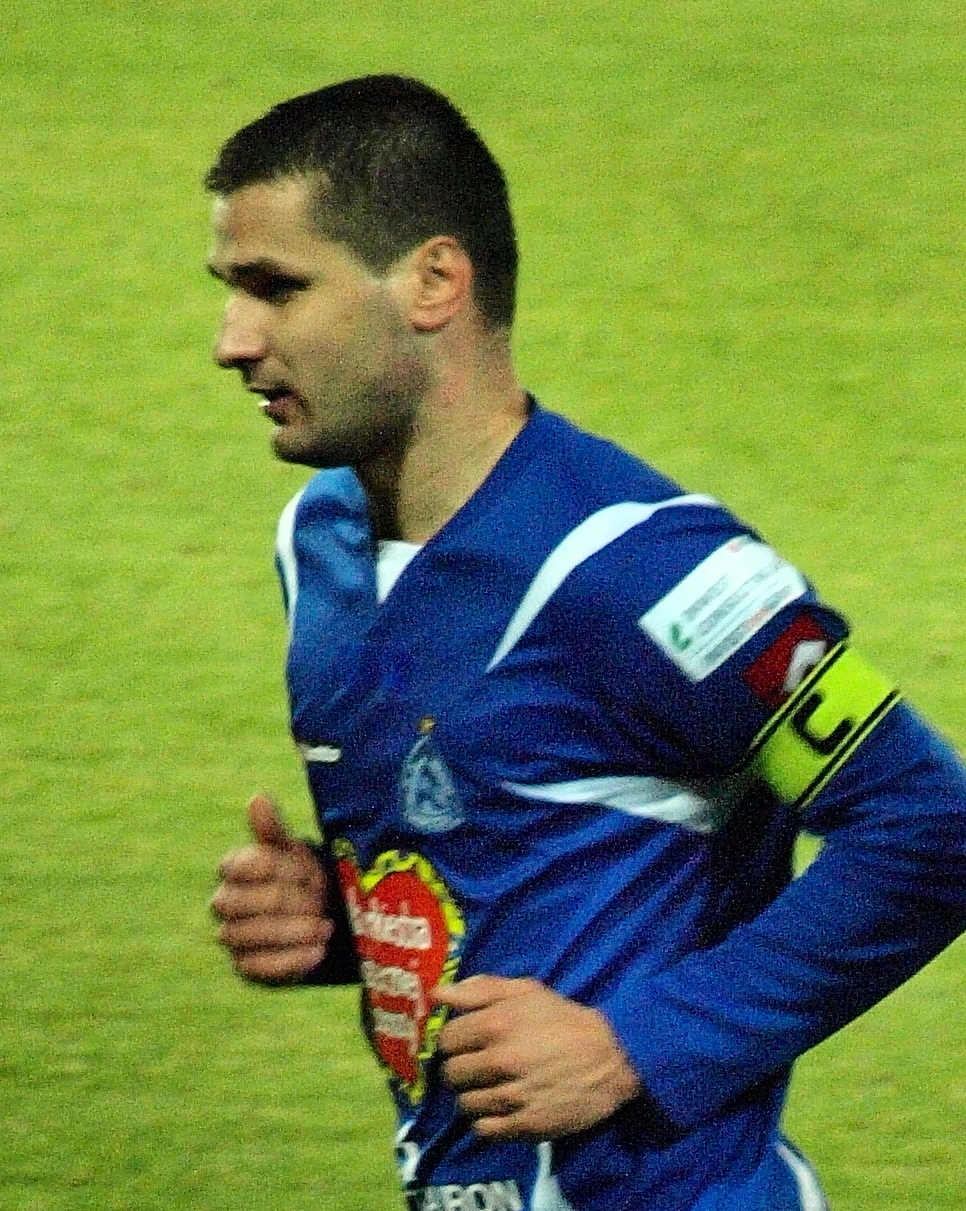

Personal information
- Full name: Grzegorz Baran
- Date of birth: 23 December 1982 (age 43)
- Place of birth: Przemyśl, Poland
- Height: 1.86 m (6 ft 1 in)
- Positions: Centre-back; defensive midfielder

Team information
- Current team: Włókniarz Rakszawa (player-manager)
- Number: 7

Senior career*
Years	Team	Apps	(Gls)
1999–2000	JKS 1909 Jarosław		
2000–2001	SMS Kraków		
2001–2003	Cracovia		
2003–2006	Górnik Wieliczka		
2006–2010	Ruch Chorzów	134	(1)
2010–2015	GKS Bełchatów	138	(3)
2015–2020	Sandecja Nowy Sącz	139	(3)
2020–2022	Poprad Muszyna	58	(12)
2022–2024	JKS 1909 Jarosław	52	(0)
2024–	Włókniarz Rakszawa	26	(2)

Managerial career
- 2022–2024: JKS 1909 Jarosław (player-manager)
- 2024–: Włókniarz Rakszawa (player-manager)
- * Club domestic league appearances and goals as of 14:53, 23 June 2025 (UTC)

Grzegorz Baran (born 23 December 1982) is a Polish professional footballer who is currently the player-manager of Polish regional league club Włókniarz Rakszawa. He is the younger brother of manager and former player Arkadiusz Baran.

== Honours ==
Ruch Chorzów

- II liga: 2006–07

GKS Bełchatów

- I liga: 2013–14

Sandecja Nowy Sącz

- I liga: 2016–17

Poprad Muszyna

- Polish Cup (Nowy Sącz regionals): 2020–21, 2021–22
