= Valeriy Sokolenko =

Ukrainian footballer (born 1982)

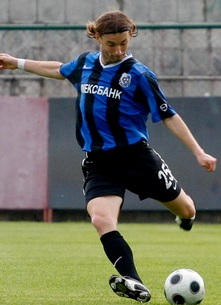
- Sokolenko in 2011

Personal information
- Date of birth: 21 June 1982 (age 44)
- Place of birth: Chernihiv, Soviet Union
- Height: 1.76 m (5 ft 9 in)
- Position: Defender

Team information
- Current team: JKS Jarosław (manager)

Youth career
- Osvita Borodianka

Senior career*
Years	Team	Apps	(Gls)
2001–2002	Systema-Boreks Borodianka	11	(1)
2002	Systema-KKhP Cherniakhiv	7	(0)
2004	Borysfen Boryspil-2	15	(0)
2005	Enerhetyk Burshtyn	31	(2)
2006	Górnik Łęczna	24	(1)
2007	Darida Minsk Raion	0	(0)
2007	Desna Chernihiv	13	(0)
2008–2009	Polonia Bytom	40	(0)
2009–2010	Energie Cottbus	4	(1)
2011	Chornomorets Odesa	13	(1)
2012–2014	Avanhard Koriukivka	44	(8)
2015	Motor Lublin	12	(2)
2015–2016	JKS 1909 Jarosław	46	(3)
2016–2020	KS Wiązownica	110	(16)
2021	Stal Łańcut	26	(3)
2022	Pogoń-Sokół Lubaczów	1	(0)
2024–2025	Wisłoczanka Tryńcza	26	(7)
Total		423	(45)

Managerial career
- 2015: Avanhard Koriukivka
- 2016–2020: KS Wiązownica (player-manager)
- 2021–2023: Pogoń-Sokół Lubaczów
- 2024: KS Wiązownica
- 2024–2025: Stal Łańcut
- 2025–: JKS Jarosław
- * Club domestic league appearances and goals

Valeriy Sokolenko (Ukrainian: Валерій Васильович Соколенко; born 21 June 1982) is a Ukrainian professional football manager and former player who is currently in charge of III liga club JKS Jarosław.

== Playing career ==
Sokolenko played for Chornomorets Odesa. In the past, he also played for such teams as Borysfen Boryspil-2, Enerhetyk Burshtyn, Górnik Łęczna, Desna Chernihiv, Polonia Bytom, and Energie Cottbus in the 2. Bundesliga.

== Managerial statistics ==
As of match played 11 June 2026

Managerial record by team and tenure
Team	From	To	Record							
Team	From	To	G	W	D	L	GF	GA	GD	Win %
KS Wiązownica (player-manager)	17 December 2016	14 October 2020	130	64	25	41	257	180	+77	49.23
Pogoń-Sokół Lubaczów	8 February 2021	7 October 2023	104	77	14	13	278	87	+191	74.04
KS Wiązownica	10 April 2024	22 September 2024	22	8	3	11	45	39	+6	36.36
Stal Łańcut	30 September 2024	30 June 2025	25	14	3	8	46	33	+13	56.00
JKS Jarosław	7 July 2025	Present	37	31	3	3	124	30	+94	83.78
Total			318	194	48	76	750	369	+381	61.01

== Honours ==
=== Player ===
Motor Lublin

- Polish Cup (Lublin subdistrict regionals): 2014–15

JKS 1909 Jarosław

- Polish Cup (Subcarpathia regionals): 2015–16
- Polish Cup (Jarosław regionals): 2015–16

KS Wiązownica

- IV liga Subcarpathia: 2019–20

Stal Łańcut

- Regional league Rzeszów: 2020–21

Wisłoczanka Tryńcza

- Regional league Jarosław: 2024–25
- Klasa A Przeworsk: 2023–24

=== Manager ===
Pogoń-Sokół Lubaczów

- Regional league Jarosław: 2022–23

KS Wiązownica

- Polish Cup (Jarosław regionals): 2023–24

JKS Jarosław

- IV liga Subcarpathia: 2025–26
