= Mieczysław Ożóg =

Polish footballer

Personal information
- Full name: Mieczysław Ożóg
- Date of birth: 23 February 1966 (age 60)
- Place of birth: Jeżowe, Poland
- Height: 1.75 m (5 ft 9 in)
- Position: Midfielder

Team information
- Current team: Bukowa Jastkowice
- Number: 2

Senior career*
Years	Team	Apps	(Gls)
1986	Stal Stalowa Wola		
1986–1988	Lublinianka		
1989–1995	Stal Stalowa Wola		
1995–1996	Siarka Tarnobrzeg	16	(2)
1996–1999	Stal Stalowa Wola		
1999–2000	Górnik Łęczna		
2001	Pogoń Staszów		
2001–2003	Stal Stalowa Wola		
2004	Pogoń Staszów		
2004	Unia Nowa Sarzyna		
2005–2007	Stal Stalowa Wola		
2007	Galicja Cisna		
2008–2011	Bukowa Jastkowice		
2012–2013	LZS Kotowa Wola		
2013–2014	Iskra Sobów		
2014–2018	Jeziorak Chwałowice		
2018–	Bukowa Jastkowice	162	(1)
- * Club domestic league appearances and goals as of 22:54, 24 June 2025 (UTC)

Mieczysław Ożóg (born 23 February 1966) is a Polish footballer who plays as a midfielder for Klasa A club Bukowa Jastkowice. He is one of the oldest players playing in Polish football, albeit not in the top league. He played in Ekstraklasa as a footballer of Stal Stalowa Wola and Siarka Tarnobrzeg.

== Club career ==
He played 108 games in the Polish Ekstraklasa and scored 8 goals. He was voted the best footballer in the Rzeszów region in a poll conducted by Tempo and Radio Rzeszów.

He started the 2007–08 season in Stal Stalowa Wola as the oldest player in the I liga and one of the oldest in the professional teams of the Polish league. Despite his age, the player had a secure place in Stal's lineup and played most of the matches as a full-time player. After losing a match against Pelikan Łowicz in early August 2007, he (along with two other players Andrzej Kasiak and Marek Kusiak) was removed from the team.

After leaving Stalowa Wola, he combined physical work with playing in the lower leagues, becoming one of the oldest active players in Poland. In the fall round of the 2023–24 season, at the age of 57, he continued to play for the Klasa A club Bukowa Jastkowice.
