= Dariusz Brytan =

Polish footballer and trainer

Personal information
- Date of birth: 16 April 1967 (age 59)
- Place of birth: Wrocław, Poland
- Height: 1.81 m (5 ft 11 in)
- Position: Forward

Senior career*
Years	Team	Apps	(Gls)
1986–1987	Metalowiec Janów Lubelski		
1988–1993	Stal Stalowa Wola		
1994	Polonia Gdańsk		
1994–1995	Motor Lublin		
1995–1998	KSZO Ostrowiec Świętokrzyski		
1998–1999	Ceramika Opoczno		
1999	RKS Radomsko		
2000–2001	Pogoń Staszów		
2001–2002	Stal Stalowa Wola		
2002–2005	Janowianka Janów Lubelski		
- * Club domestic league appearances and goals

Dariusz Brytan (born 16 April 1967) is a Polish former professional footballer who played as a forward.

== Club career ==
He started his career in Metalowiec Janów Lubelski before playing for Stal Stalowa Wola, Polonia Gdańsk, Motor Lublin, KSZO Ostrowiec Świętokrzyski, Ceramika Opoczno, RKS Radomsko, Pogoń Staszów, Janowianka Janów Lubelski.

He started a new career as a football trainer and council member in 2004/05, as a panel member on a committee concerning health, education, culture and sport.

== Private life ==
He is a father of Sebastian Brytan; a former footballer associated with Janowianka Janów Lubelski, KSZO Ostrowiec Świętokrzyski and Stal Kraśnik.
