= Janusz Batugowski =

Polish footballer and manager (1948–2022)

Personal information
- Date of birth: 2 February 1948
- Place of birth: Opatów, Poland
- Date of death: 4 September 2022 (aged 74)
- Position: Defender

College career
Years	Team	Apps	(Gls)
- AWF Warsaw

Senior career*
Years	Team	Apps	(Gls)
- OKS Opatów
- Star Starachowice
- Błękitni Kielce

Managerial career
- 1990–1992: Błękitni Kielce
- 1992–1994: Błękitni Kielce
- 1994–1996: KSZO Ostrowiec Świętokrzyski
- 1996–1998: Błękitni Kielce
- 1999–2000: RKS Radomsko
- 2000–2001: Pogoń Staszów
- 2001: Star Starachowice
- 2001–2002: Pogoń Staszów
- 2002: KSZO Ostrowiec Świętokrzyski
- 2003–2004: Pogoń Staszów
- * Club domestic league appearances and goals

Janusz Batugowski (2 February 1948 – September 2022) was a Polish football manager and former player, best known for managing KSZO Ostrowiec Świętokrzyski in the Ekstraklasa.

== Honours ==
=== Manager ===
KSZO Ostrowiec Świętokrzyski

- III liga, group IV: 1994–95
