= Tomasz Abramowicz =

Polish footballer

Personal information
- Full name: Tomas Abramowicz
- Date of birth: 15 February 1979 (age 47)
- Place of birth: Ełk, Poland
- Height: 1.82 m (5 ft 11 1/2 in)
- Positions: Midfielder; forward

Youth career
- Stal Mielec

Senior career*
Years	Team	Apps	(Gls)
1996–1997	Stal Mielec	7	(1)
1998	Zagłębie Sosnowiec		
1998–2002	Stal Mielec		
2003	Sokół Nisko		
2003	Pogoń Leżajsk		
2004	Stal Mielec		
2004	Polonia Stanford		
2004–2005	Stal Mielec		
2005	AKS Busko Zdrój	??	(1)
2005	Stal Mielec		
2006	Wisłoka Dębica		
2007–2010	Kolbuszowianka Kolbuszowa		
2010	Start Wola Mielecka		
2010	Kolbuszowianka Kolbuszowa		
2011–2023	Victoria Czermin		
2023–2024	Stal Mielec II	11	(2)
2024–	Victoria Czermin	3	(0)
- * Club domestic league appearances and goals as of 20:30, 24 June 2025 (UTC)

Tomasz Abramowicz (born 15 February 1979) is a Polish footballer who plays as a midfielder or forward.

== Club career ==
Abramowicz began his career as a trainee with Stal Mielec. He made his Ekstraklasa debut on 6 April 1996 as a substitute in a 2–0 defeat against Pogoń Szczecin and scored his first goal on 15 May in a match against GKS Bełchatów. Abramowicz ended the 1995–96 season with one goal in seven league appearances. But Stal finished 17th and were relegated to II liga (second tier). After the 1996–97 season Abramowicz moved to Zagłębie Sosnowiec.

Later he played for various clubs from lower divisions and other countries, including Sokół Nisko, Pogoń Leżajsk, Polonia Stanford, AKS Busko Zdrój, Wisłoka Dębica and Kolubszowianka Kolubszowa. In August 2010 he moved to Start Wola Mielecka.

In 2011, he joined the liga okręgowa side Victoria Czermin.

== Honours ==
Stal Mielec II

- Regional league Dębica: 2023–24
