= Paweł Rybak =

Polish footballer

Personal information
- Date of birth: 8 January 1967 (age 59)
- Place of birth: Stalowa Wola, Poland
- Height: 1.75 m (5 ft 9 in)
- Position: Defender

Senior career*
Years	Team	Apps	(Gls)
- LZS Wola Rzeczycka
1986–2003	Stal Stalowa Wola		
2004	Sokół Nisko		
2004–2006	Unia Nowa Sarzyna		
2006	Sokół Nisko		
2016	KS Jarocin		

Managerial career
- 2007–2009: LZS Turbia
- 2016: OKS Mokrzyszów
- * Club domestic league appearances and goals

Paweł Rybak (born 8 January 1967) is a Polish former professional football manager and player who played as a defender.

== Career ==
He started his career with LZS Wola Rzeczycka. In 1986 he joined Stal Stalowa Wola, for which he played 87 games and scored 4 goals in the top division. In February 2004, the Polish club announced that they had parted ways with Rybak. After leaving Stal, he represented Sokół Nisko.

He managed LZS Turbia and OKS Mokrzyszów.
