= Sokół Nisko =

Polish football club

- Full name: Miejski Klub Sportowy Sokół Nisko
- Founded: 1919; 107 years ago
- Ground: Nisko Stadium
- Capacity: 1,600
- Chairman: Piotr Wałek
- Coach: Jarosław Pacholarz
- League: IV liga Subcarpathia
- 2024–25: 10th od 18
- Website: https://sokolnisko.pl
Home colours	Away colours	Third colours

Miejski Klub Sportowy Sokół Nisko (lit. 'Municipal Sports Club Sokół Nisko'), commonly referred to as Sokół Nisko (Polish pronunciation: [sɔˈkuw niskɔ]), is a Polish football club based in Nisko, Podkarpackie Voivodeship. In the 2024–25 season, they compete in the IV liga Subcarpathia, after winning the Stalowa Wola group of the regional league the season prior. The club's name literally means falcon in Polish, and it comes from the Polish Gymnastic Society Sokół.

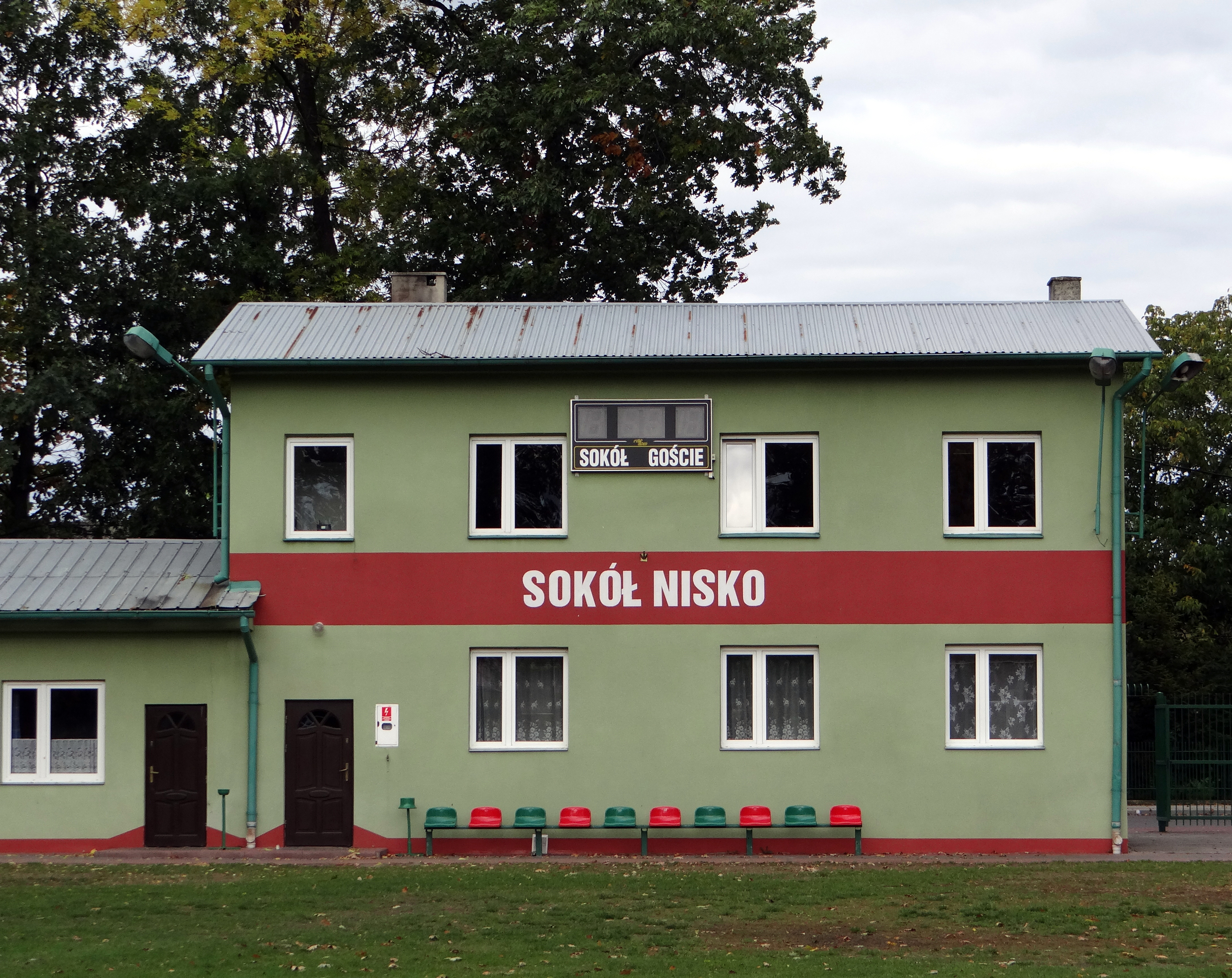
Sokół's main club building

== History ==
The club was founded in 1919, primarily participating in the Lwów's sub-district B-class. After World War II, from 1944 the club operated under the name OMTUR Nisko, and later, in the early period of the Polish People's Republic, it operated under other names under the nomenclature of sports associations: Zenit Nisko, Związkowiec Nisko and Ogniwo Nisko. The greatest success of this team were appearances in III liga, then the third tier. From the 2008–09 season, the team regularly plays between the 5th and 6th football's level.

In the 2007–08 and 2008–09 seasons, the club won the Polish Cup at the level of the Stalowa Wola sub-district, defeating Tłoki Gorzyce after penalties and Siarka Tarnobrzeg in extra time with a score of 5–4.

== Honours ==
- Subcarpathian/Rzeszów Polish Cup
  - Winners: 1965, 1966, 1967, 1988
  - Finalists: 2008–09
- Subcarpathian Stalowa Wola Polish Cup
  - Winners: 2007–08, 2008–09, 2016–17
- VI Central Village Spartakiad in Poznań
  - Winners: 1966

== Stadium ==
They play their home matches at the Nisko Stadium at the 20 Tadeusz Kościuszko Street. The capacity of the stadium is 1,600 places (950 with seats).

== Players ==
=== Notable players ===
- (Poland) Tomasz Abramowicz, Ekstraklasa player with Stal Mielec in 1990s.
- Witold Karaś, player of the Poland national team in 1970s, Ekstraklasa player with Stal Mielec in 1960s–1980s.
- (Poland) Dariusz Michalak, Ekstraklasa player with Stal Stalowa Wola in 1990s.
- (Poland) Paweł Rybak, Ekstraklasa player with Stal Stalowa Wola in 1990s.

== Club statistics ==
Season	League	Place	W	D	L	GF	GA	Pts
2015–16	IV liga Subcarpathia (V)	2nd of 16	19	8	3	65	30	65
2016–17	IV liga Subcarpathia (V)	5th of 18	16	6	12	41	48	54
2017–18	IV liga Subcarpathia (V)	11th of 17	11	4	17	42	51	37
2018–19	IV liga Subcarpathia (V)	15th of 18	11	3	20	41	67	36
2019–20	Klasa okręgowa Stalowa Wola (VI)	1st of 16 (Note: The competition has been abandoned due to the COVID-19 pandemic in Poland. The top team of the league at the time of the abandonment, Sokół Nisko, were promoted to the IV liga)	12	2	1	49	13	38
2020–21	IV liga Subcarpathia (V)	16th of 22 (Note: Initially, the above-mentioned place kept them in the IV liga, since due to the relegation of KS Wiązownica from the III to IV liga, Sokół was relegated back to the klasa okręgowa for the 2021–22 season.)	11	10	13	57	61	43
2021–22	Klasa okręgowa Stalowa Wola (VI)	1st of 15	23	1	4	98	26	70
2022–23	IV liga Subcarpathia (V)	15th of 18	7	5	22	33	78	26
2023–24	Klasa okręgowa Stalowa Wola (VI)	1st of 18	24	0	4	81	20	72
2024–25	IV liga Subcarpathia (V)	10th of 18	13	10	11	58	54	49
Green marks a season followed by promotion, red a season followed by relegation.

== Supporters ==
Sokół Nisko fans have a friendship with supporters of the local giant Stal Stalowa Wola. They also had their fan group that suspended its activities in 2019.

== Reserve team ==
Sokół Nisko II served as the Sokół's reserve side. The greatest success of this team was promotion to the sixth-tier liga okręgowa (regional league). In the years 2009–2013 Sokół II played in klasa B, in the season 2012–13 they won the promotion back to klasa A. After taking a place in the relegation zone after the 2013–14 season, they did not continue to play in the following years.
