= Piotr Piechniak =

Polish footballer

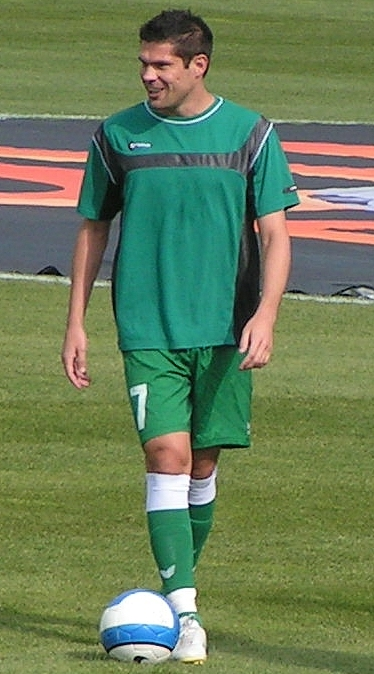

Personal information
- Full name: Piotr Piechniak
- Date of birth: 9 March 1977 (age 49)
- Place of birth: Stalowa Wola, Poland
- Height: 1.84 m (6 ft 0 in)
- Position: Winger

Senior career*
Years	Team	Apps	(Gls)
1996–1998	Stal Stalowa Wola		
1998–1999	Hetman Zamość		
1999	Stal Stalowa Wola		
2000–2008	Dyskobolia Grodzisk Wlkp.	198	(20)
2004	→ Obra Kościan (loan)		
2008	Polonia Warsaw	12	(1)
2009	Levadiakos	11	(0)
2009–2010	Odra Wodzisław	28	(5)
2010–2011	GKS Katowice	22	(3)
2011–2012	Resovia	17	(2)
2011–2012	LZS Turbia		
2012–2013	Olimpia Pysznica		
2013–2014	TG Sokół Sokołów Małopolski		
2014	Orzeł Rudnik nad Sanem		
2015	Stal Kraśnik		

International career
2003–2007	Poland	3	(0)
- * Club domestic league appearances and goals

Piotr Piechniak (born 9 March 1977) is a Polish former professional footballer who played as a winger.

== Career ==
=== National team ===
From 2003 to 2007, Piechniak played for the Poland national football team.

=== Club ===
In June 2010, he joined GKS Katowice. He was released one year later.

In July 2011, he signed a one-year contract with Resovia.

== Honours ==
Dyskobolia Grodzisk Wlkp.

- Polish Cup: 2006–07
- Ekstraklasa Cup: 2006–07, 2007–08
