= Waldemar Adamczyk =

Polish footballer

Personal information
- Date of birth: 3 July 1969 (age 57)
- Place of birth: Kraków, Poland
- Height: 1.82 m (6 ft 0 in)
- Position: Forward

Senior career*
Years	Team	Apps	(Gls)
1992–1993	Górnik Jaworzno		
1993–1997	Hutnik Kraków	112	(23)
1997	Skoda Xanthi	17	(4)
1998–1999	OFI	25	(4)
1999	Apollon Smyrnis	17	(0)
1999	Petro Płock	12	(4)
2000	Śląsk Wrocław		
2000	Ceramika Opoczno		
2001	Zagłębie Sosnowiec		
2001–2002	Aluminium Konin		
2002–2003	Stal Stalowa Wola	27	(3)
2003–2004	Przebój Wolbrom		
2004	Aris Limassol	3	(0)
2005	Anagennisi Deryneia		
2007–2010	Wróblowianka Wróblowice		
2010	Tempo Białka		

International career
1997	Poland	2	(0)
- * Club domestic league appearances and goals

Waldemar Adamczyk (born 3 July 1969) is a Polish former professional footballer who played as a forward.
