= MOSiR Stadium (Stalowa Wola) =

Former stadium of Stal Stalowa Wola

- Interactive map of MOSiR Stadium
- Location: Ulica Hutnicza 12, 37-450; Stalowa Wola, Poland
- Coordinates: 50.561463°N 22.052845°E
- Owner: City of Stalowa Wola
- Operator: MOSiR Stalowa Wola
- Capacity: 2,937
- Record attendance: 12,000; Stal 1–0 Legia Warsaw, October 30, 1994

Construction
- Expanded: 1968, 2006, 2011-2013, 2014
- Demolished: 2016 (football facility only)

Tenant
- Stal Stalowa Wola football (1930s–2020)

The Municipal Sports and Recreation Center Stadium (Polish: Stadion Miejskiego Ośrodka Sportu i Rekreacji), commonly referred to as MOSiR Stadium, is a sports stadium and former football venue located in Stalowa Wola, Poland. It served as the home ground for Stal Stalowa Wola until the club relocated to the Subcarpathian Football Center in 2020. Presently, the Municipal Sports and Recreation Center in Stalowa Wola oversees various facilities, including the athletics stadium situated near the San River and sports halls adjacent to the Hutnicza Street.

== History ==
The stadium, constructed in the late 1930s, was one of the earliest edifices in Stalowa Wola, boasting a maximum capacity of 12,000. It underwent renovations in 1968 and 2006. Notably, in 1994, it hosted Legia Warsaw during Stal Stalowa Wola's triumphant 1–0 Ekstraklasa victory, drawing a record attendance of 12,000.

Following the installation of seats, the stadium's capacity was reduced to 10,000. By the time the last stands were demolished, the capacity had dwindled to 2,937. The demolition process lasted until 2016, after which the construction of the Subcarpathian Football Center commenced. A small portion of the arch, including the visitor's section, was preserved until the inauguration of the new arena in 2020.

In July 2020, the MOSiR Stadium hosted the Subcarpathian Polish Athletic Association qualifying meeting.
