= TG Sokół Sokołów Małopolski =

Polish football club

- Full name: Towarzystwo Gimnastyczne; Sokół Sokołów Małopolski
- Nicknames: Sokoły (The Falcons); TGS
- Founded: 17 November 1894; 131 years ago
- Ground: TG Sokół Stadium
- Capacity: 1,200
- Chairman: Sławomir Dec
- Manager: vacant
- League: Klasa A Rzeszów
- 2025–26: Regional league Rzeszów, 14th of 16 (relegated)
- Website: http://www.tgsokol.com
| Home colours | Away colours |

The TG Sokół Sokołów Małopolski is a Polish football club based in Sokołów Małopolski, Poland. The club (as an independent gymnastic society) was established on 17 November 1894. They're currently playing in the Klasa A, the seventh league level.

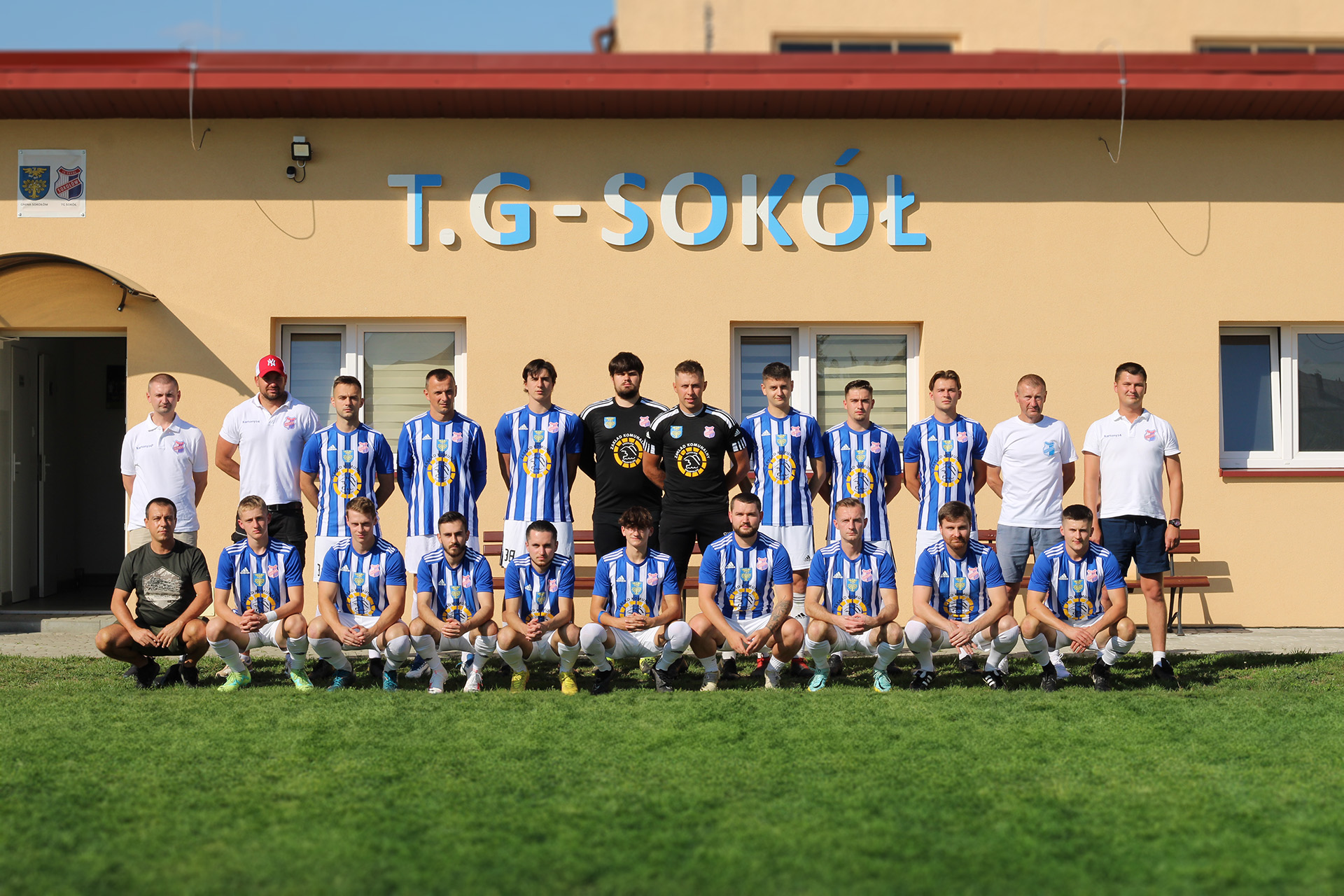
TG Sokół Sokołów Małopolski (football team) in 2023

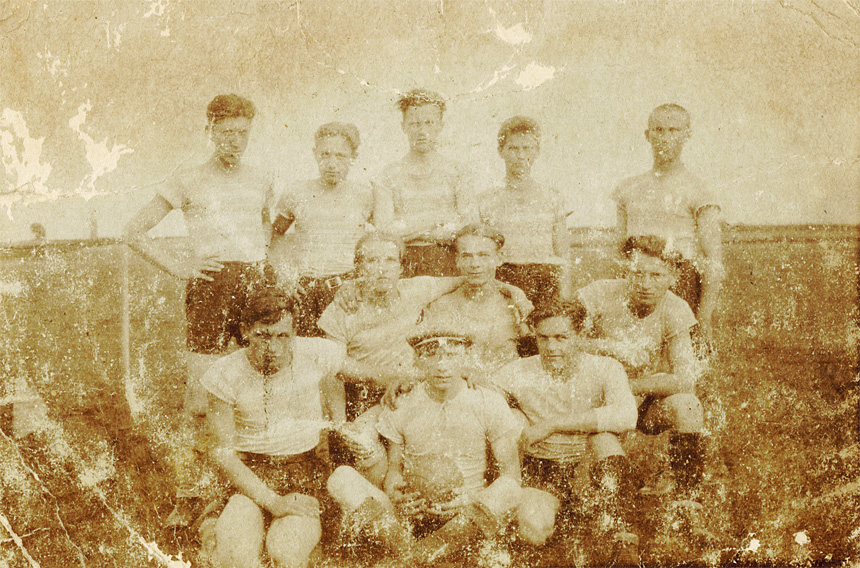
TG Sokół Sokołów Małopolski footballers in 1923

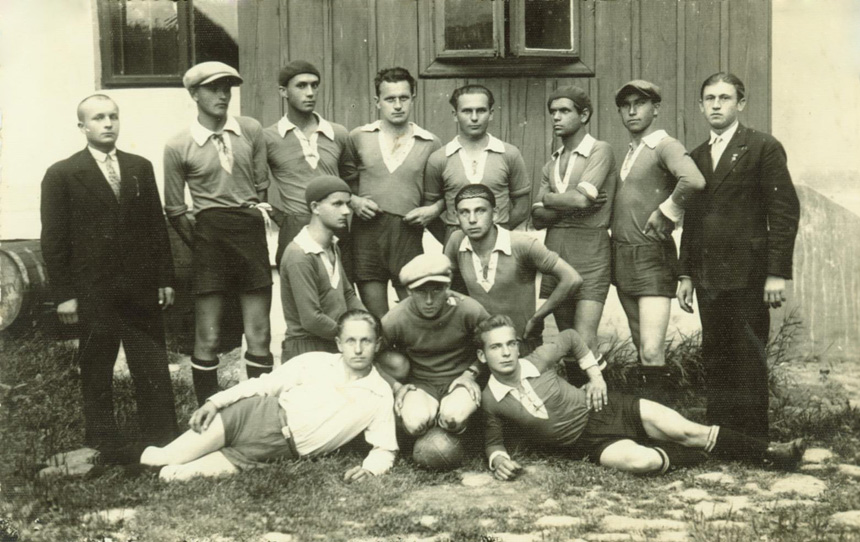
TG Sokół football team in 1936

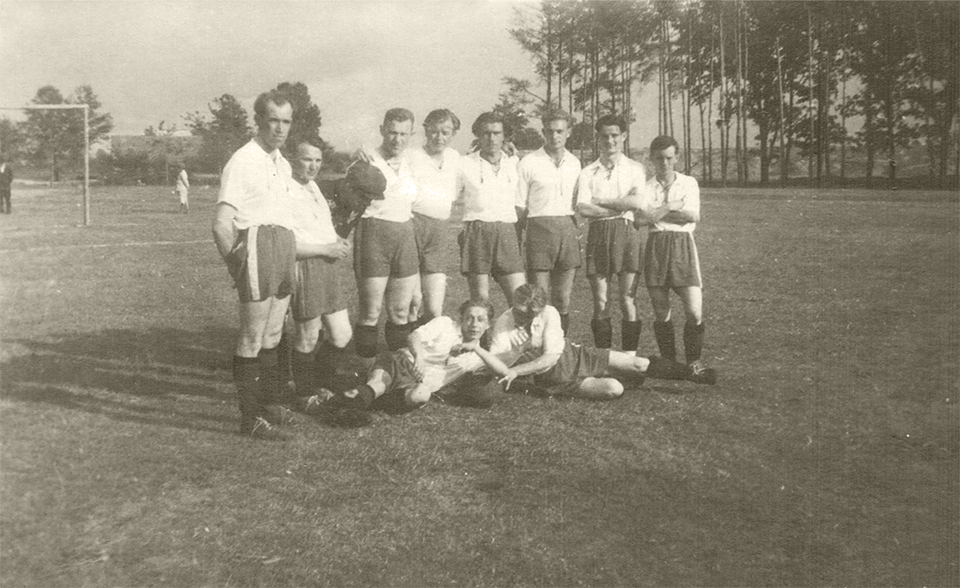
First post-war football team in Sokołów Małopolski (1946)

== History ==
The organisation was founded on the initiative of twenty-three members in 1894. The first chairman of TG Sokół Sokołów Małopolski was Karol de Rüdenstein Rampelt. Originally, the club consisted of gymnastics, athletics and bowling sections.

Association football was introduced in Sokołów in the summer of 1912 by Józef Woś, a student of Lviv University. Among the first Sokołów football enthusiasts and founders of the football team were Tadeusz Niedziocha, Karol Piela and Franciszek Smolak. TG Sokół played its first matches at Błonia near Turza, but in 1921 the club moved to the new stadium, where it has been playing ever since. In the interwar period, TG Sokół was a member of Lwów District Football Association also known as Lwów League.

In 1920s and 1930s there also existed volleyball, acrobatics and basketball club departments.

TG Sokół Sokołów Małopolski was a founding member of the Rzeszów sub-district Football Association in 1938.

The club disbanded in 1939 after the beginning of the World War II. During the war, the team suspended play until being re-established in 1945, but the new Soviet authorities banned the Sokół and it was not allowed to emerge after the war.

In 1947, the club was reactivated under the name of the Związkowy Klub Sportowy Związkowiec. The initiators of the revival of sports in Sokołów Małopolski in the post-war period were Tadeusz Łuszczki, Mieczysław Bieniek, Jan Osiniak, Piotr Pasierb, Kazimierz Stawiarski, Tadeusz Marian Śmietana and also some former players and activists of Pogoń Lwów.

== Nowadays ==
In 2015, the club runs a football academy called Akademia Futbolu TG Sokół (Football Academy of TG Sokół). In 2019, TG Sokół became a youth partner of Raków Częstochowa.

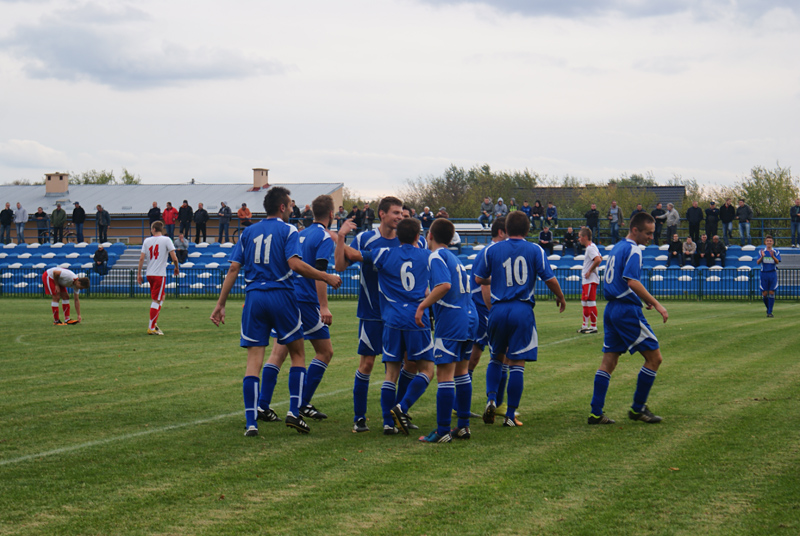
TG Sokół homeground in 2013

== Current team ==
As of 9 August 2023

Note: Flags indicate national team as defined under FIFA eligibility rules; some limited exceptions apply. Players may hold more than one non-FIFA nationality.

| No. | Pos. | Nation | Player |
|---|---|---|---|
| 1 | GK | POL | Łukasz Surowiec |
| 2 | DF | POL | Maciej Gielar |
| 3 | DF | POL | Dominik Pietroński (captain) |
| 4 | DF | POL | Andrzej Warzocha |
| 5 | MF | POL | Kacper Jakim |
| 6 | MF | POL | Jakub Rak |
| 7 | MF | POL | Jakub Ożóg |
| 8 | DF | POL | Rafał Lelek |
| 9 | FW | POL | Tomasz Walat |
| 10 | MF | POL | Bartosz Grzesik |
| 11 | FW | POL | Łukasz Nizioł |

| No. | Pos. | Nation | Player |
|---|---|---|---|
| 12 | MF | POL | Rafał Korbecki |
| 13 | DF | POL | Radosław Rożek |
| 14 | FW | POL | Sylwester Bigdoń |
| 15 | MF | POL | Damian Szary |
| 16 | DF | POL | Kamil Sidor |
| 17 | MF | POL | Krzysztof Frącz |
| 18 | MF | POL | Daniel Mazurek |
| 19 | MF | POL | Dariusz Kurasiński |
| 77 | MF | POL | Sebastian Rodzeń |
| 97 | GK | POL | Piotr Gnatek |

== Honours ==
=== Football ===
- Regional OZPN Rzeszów Cup (winner) – 1950–51
- 1st place – Klasa A (promotion to the regional league – 3rd level) – 1971–72
- III liga participation: 1973–74

=== Badminton ===
- Second League – 1986–87, 1987–88, 1988–89, 1989–90
- 4th place - Youth Championships of Poland - 1989

== Club name variations ==
- 1894 – TG Sokół Sokołów Małopolski
- 1945 – KS Sokołów Małopolski
- 1947 – ZKS Związkowiec Sokołów Małopolski
- 1951 – KS Spójnia Sokołów Małopolski
- 1955 – KS Sparta Sokołów Małopolski
- 1957 – KS Sokołowianka Sokołów Małopolski
- 1998 – TG Sokół Sokołów Małopolski
- 2002 – Crunchips TG Sokół Sokołów Małopolski
- 2003 – TG Sokół Sokołów Małopolski

== Stadium ==
The construction of the current stadium of the club was completed in 1921 and is located in the west of the city.

== Famous players ==
- Piotr Piechniak, player of Poland national football team, former player of Levadiakos, Polonia Warsaw, GKS Katowice, Odra Wodzisław and Dyskobolia Grodzisk Wielkopolski
- (Poland) Janusz Czyrek, former player of Zawisza Bydgoszcz and Stal Mielec
- (Poland) Mariusz Stelmach, former player of Śląsk Wrocław
- (Poland) Zdzisław Napieracz, former player of Zagłębie Sosnowiec and Stal Rzeszów
- (Poland) Zygmunt Marciniak, former player of Zawisza Bydgoszcz and Cracovia

== Chairmen ==
- (Austria) Karol de Rüdenstein Rampelt (since 1894)
- (Austria) Ignacy Pasierb
- (Austria) Jakub Stąpor
- (Austria) Franciszek Stąpor
- (Poland) Jan Grzybczyk-Rejent (since 1918)
- (Poland) Wincenty Stawiarski (to 1939)
- (Poland) Antoni Bałajewicz (1947–1950)
- (Poland) Jan Mikulaniec (1950–1951)
- (Poland) Marcin Kuryś (1951–1952)
- (Poland) Franciszek Ożóg (1952–1953)
- (Poland) Roman Babula (1953–1954)
- (Poland) Marcin Gabriel (1954–1955)
- (Poland) Teodor Piękoś (1955–1957)
- (Poland) Kazimierz Stawiarski (1957–1958)
- (Poland) Teodor Piękoś (1958–1959)
- (Poland) Kazimierz Stawiarski (1959–1961)
- (Poland) Teodor Piękoś (1961)
- (Poland) Jan Osiniak (1961–1962)
- (Poland) Teodor Piękoś (1962–1965)
- (Poland) Kazimierz Stawiarski (1965–1966)
- (Poland) Stanisław Chorzępa (1966–1981)
- (Poland) Jan Bieńkowski (1981–1988)
- (Poland) Władysław Frącz (1988)
- (Poland) Jan Bieńkowski (1988–1999)
- (Poland) Tadeusz Piela (1999–2004)
- (Poland) Kazimierz Woś (2004–2007)
- (Poland) Piotr Holdenmajer (2007)
- (Poland) Kazimierz Woś (2007–2011)
- (Poland) Mateusz Szot (2011–2014)
- (Poland) Mirosław Kus (2014)
- (Poland) Sławomir Dec (2014–present)

== See also ==
- Football in Poland
- List of football teams
- Sokołów Małopolski
