= Dominik Jończy =

Polish footballer (born 1997)

Personal information
- Full name: Dominik Jończy
- Date of birth: 17 May 1997 (age 29)
- Place of birth: Jelenia Góra, Poland
- Height: 1.89 m (6 ft 2 in)
- Position: Centre-back

Youth career
- –2011: KKS Jelenia Góra
- 2011–2012: Chojnik Jelenia Góra
- 2012–2015: Zagłębie Lubin

Senior career*
Years	Team	Apps	(Gls)
2015–2019	Zagłębie Lubin II	52	(7)
2017–2021	Zagłębie Lubin	19	(0)
2018	→ Chojniczanka (loan)	9	(0)
2018–2019	→ Podbeskidzie (loan)	22	(0)
2021–2024	Zagłębie Sosnowiec	77	(1)
2024–2025	Stal Stalowa Wola	11	(2)

International career
2017–2018	Poland U20	4	(0)
2019	Poland U21	1	(0)
- * Club domestic league appearances and goals as of 16:31, 4 January 2025 (UTC)

Dominik Jończy (born 17 May 1997) is a Polish professional footballer who plays as a centre-back.

== Career ==
Jończy made his professional debut for Zagłębie Lubin in the Ekstraklasa on 7 April 2017, starting in the home match against Jagiellonia Białystok, which finished as a 4–3 loss.

On 25 June 2024, he was signed by Stal Stalowa Wola. On 4 January 2025, he and Stal parted ways amicably.

== Honours ==
Zagłębie Lubin II

- IV liga Lower Silesia West: 2016–17
- Polish Cup (Lower Silesia regionals): 2016–17
- Polish Cup (Legnica regionals): 2016–17
