= Stadion Miejski (Nisko) =

Polish stadium

- Stadion Miejski w Nisku
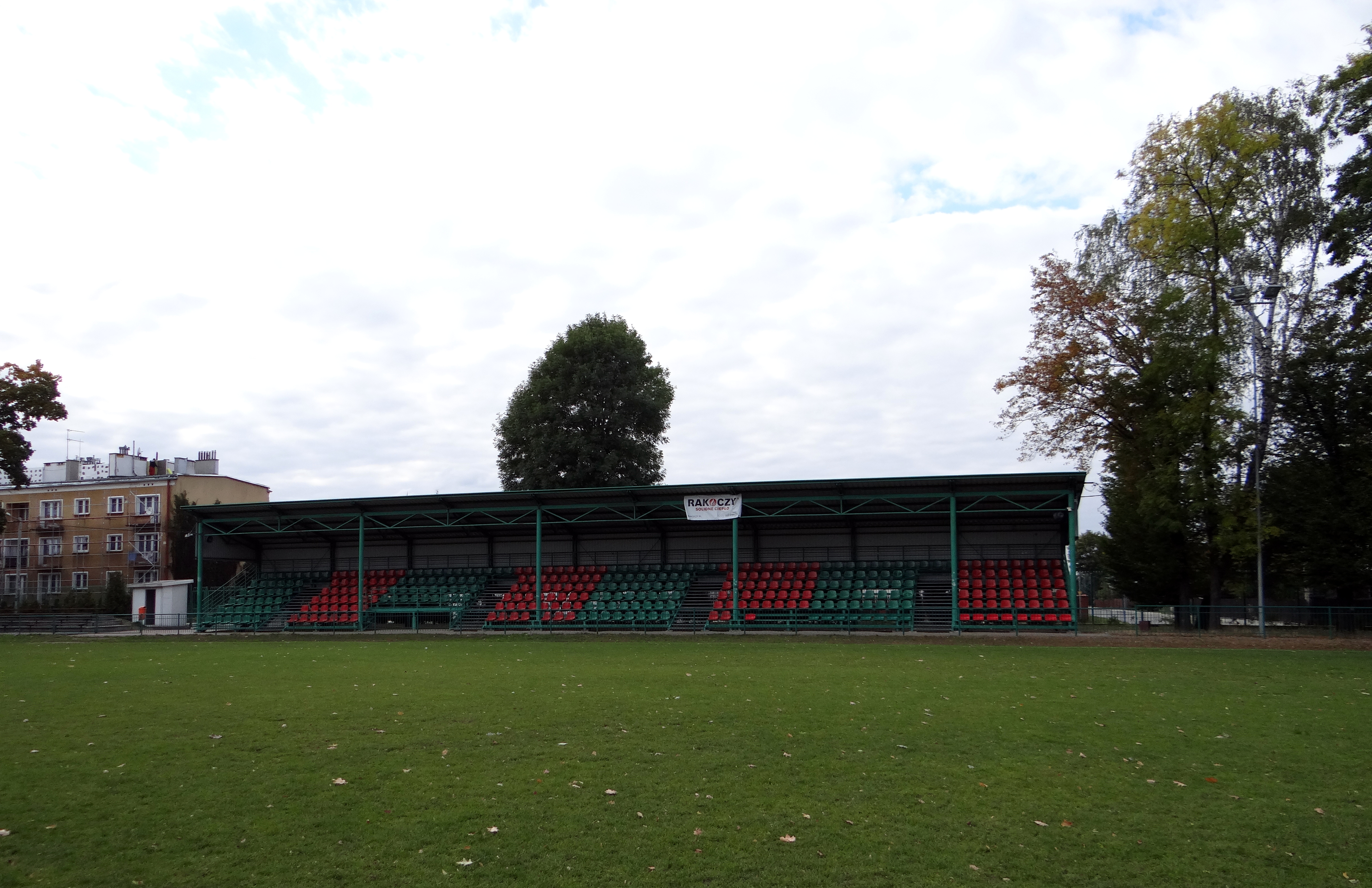
- Interactive map of Stadion Miejski
- Address: 20 Tadeusz Kościuszko Street
- Location: Nisko, Podkarpackie Voivodeship, Poland
- Coordinates: 50.5221076°N 22.1475049°E
- Capacity: 1,600
- Type: Stadium
- Event: Association football
- Surface: grass
- Field size: 104 x 70
- Current use: Association football

Construction
- Renovated: 2017

Tenant
- Sokół Nisko

The MKS Sokół Nisko Stadium (Stadion MKS Sokół w Nisku) is a football stadium owned by the town of Nisko, Poland. It serves as the home ground for Sokół Nisko's matches and is also the venue for the annual Nisko Days.

== History ==
The stadium was built in the interwar period. During World War II, a match between the Hungarian and German army teams was held there, as Hungarians won 4–3. On 16 June 2009, it hosted a first-leg final game of the Subcarpathian Polish Cup, as Sokół Nisko was defeated 6–2 by Resovia.

In 2017, the stadium underwent renovations. A cloakroom and a gym were built, the roof was replaced, pitch lighting was added, and the old stand was renovated. The cost of renovations was PLN 490,000.

On 22 July 2020, the stadium hosted the regional Polish Cup final game, as Sokół Sokolniki faced Unia Nowa Sarzyna., and eventually lost 5–0.

== Dni Niska ==
The stadium also hosts the Nisko's Days (Polish: Dni Niska) annual event, in which well-known Polish music bands take part – as Dżem, Kombi and Zakopower.

== Tenants ==
- (Poland) Sokół Nisko
