= Dariusz Michalak =

Polish footballer

Personal information
- Full name: Dariusz Michalak
- Date of birth: 21 July 1966 (age 60)
- Place of birth: Poland
- Height: 1.78 m (5 ft 10 in)
- Position: Midfielder

Youth career
- Stal Stalowa Wola

Senior career*
Years	Team	Apps	(Gls)
–1988	Stal Stalowa Wola	0	(0)
1988	Sokół Nisko		
1989–1993	Stal Stalowa Wola	4 (Note: Only Ekstraklasa caps included)	(0 (Note: Only Ekstraklasa goals included))
1993–1994	Błękitni Kielce		
1994–1995	Stal Stalowa Wola	21 (Note: Only Ekstraklasa caps included)	(2 (Note: Only Ekstraklasa goals included))
1995	Stal Sanok		
1995–1996	Stal Stalowa Wola		
1996–1997	Łada Biłgoraj		
1997–1998	Tłoki Gorzyce		
1998	Avia Świdnik		
1999–2000	Dynovia Dynów		
2000–2001	Górnovia Górno		
2001–2003	Resovia		
2003	Stal Stalowa Wola		
2004	Górnovia Górno		
2004–2006	Sokół Nisko		

Managerial career
- 2004–2006: Sokół Nisko (player-manager)
- * Club domestic league appearances and goals

Dariusz Michalak (born 21 July 1966) is a Polish former footballer who played as a midfielder.

== Career ==
From the age of 7, he trained football in Stal Stalowa Wola, of which he is a home-grown. Among his coaches was Rudolf Patkoló. In the colors of "Stalówka" he was promoted twice to Ekstraklasa (1990–91 and 1993–94 seasons). He had his direct share in the first of these successes, when on June 19, 1991, in the last game of the I liga season, which was also a derby match with Siarka Tarnobrzeg, he scored a goal (as Stal won 2-0), thus ensuring Stal's first place competitions. In the colors of Stal he played in the highest league of the 1991–92 and 1994–95 editions. In total, he played 25 games in Ekstraklasa, in which he scored two goals.

In the summer of 1995 he became a player of the III liga side Stal Sanok for the 1995–96 season. After the autumn round in this team he returned to Stal Stalowa Wola. He was an active footballer until the age of 40 as the Sokół Nisko's player. He was a right-footed athlete.

After retiring from professional football, he worked in Huta Stalowa Wola. As a coach, he led the Sokół Nisko junior team and was a playing coach for the senior team until 2006. He was also the coach of youth groups in his home Stal Stalowa Wola.

== Private life ==
He is the son of Jan Michalak, the ZKS Stal Stalowa Wola's boxer.
