= Mirosław Mścisz =

Polish footballer

Personal information
- Date of birth: 14 July 1963 (age 63)
- Height: 1.82 m (6 ft 0 in)
- Position: Defender

Senior career*
Years	Team	Apps	(Gls)
1979–1988	Stal Stalowa Wola		
1988–1989	Lublinianka		
1989–1993	Stal Stalowa Wola	52+ (Note: The statistics only include appearances in Ekstraklasa)	(1+)
- * Club domestic league appearances and goals

Mirosław Mścisz (born 14 July 1963) is a Polish former professional footballer who played as a defender. He made 52 appearances in the Ekstraklasa for Stal Stalowa Wola.
