= Subcarpathian Football Center =

Football training complex in Stalowa Wola

- Podkarpackie Centrum Piłki Nożnej
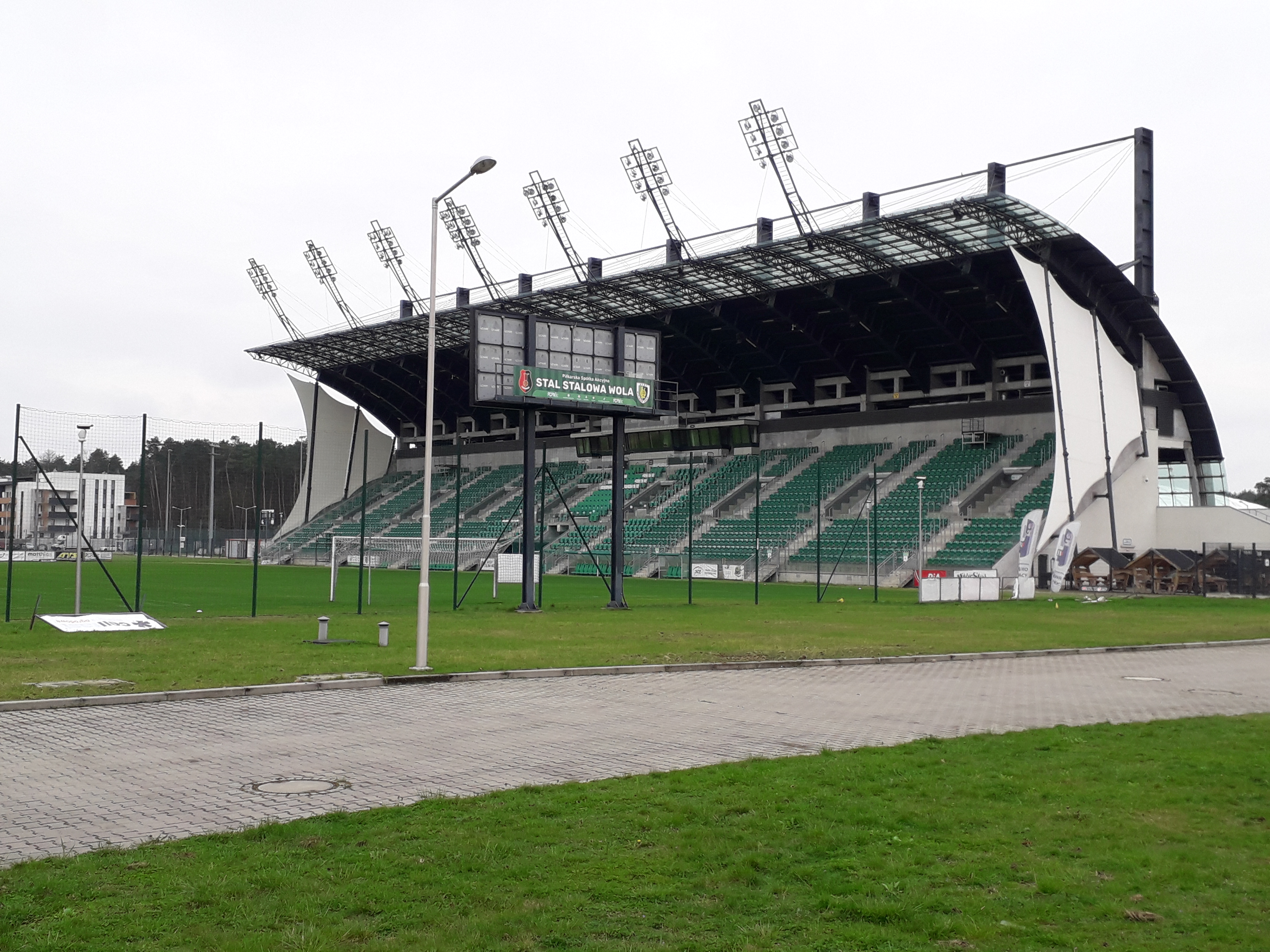
- Interactive map of Subcarpathian Football Center
- Location: Ulica Hutnicza 10a, 37-450; Stalowa Wola, Poland
- Coordinates: 50.561463°N 22.052845°E
- Owner: City of Stalowa Wola
- Capacity: 3,764
- Record attendance: 4,282; Poland u-20 3–1 Portugal u-20, 27 September 2022
- Field size: 105m x 68m
- Public transit: Hutnicza-Apteka; Stalowa Wola railway station

Construction
- Built: 2016–2020
- Opened: 29 February 2020; 6 years ago
- Cost: PLN 44–90 million
- Architects: Studio Projektowe Luksor; HSW Zakład Projektowo Technologiczny

Tenant
- Stal Stalowa Wola (2020–present)

The Subcarpathian Football Center (Polish: Podkarpackie Centrum Piłki Nożnej, PCPN) is a football training complex in Stalowa Wola, Poland, comprising a main pitch, two pitches with artificial turf, two full-size pitches, and one full-size pitch with natural grass. The main pitch serves as the home stadium for Stal Stalowa Wola. Opened in 2020, the stadium is equipped with lighting and a heated pitch, and has a seating capacity of 3,764, including 258 seats for visiting fans.

The stadium is currently owned by the City of Stalowa Wola. The stadium is named Stadium Stalowa Wola and Stal Stalowa Wola Stadium in UEFA matches.

== History ==
The previous stadium located at this site was known as the "Stadion Miejskiego Ośrodka Sportu i Rekreacji" (MOSiR Stadium). It was among the first structures erected in Stalowa Wola in the late 1930s, with a maximum capacity of 12,000 spectators.

Construction work for the new stadium commenced in June 2011 with the demolition of the stand along Hutnicza Street. Currently, a covered stand with a capacity of 1,430 seats occupies its place. In 2016, recognized as the commencement year for the Subcarpathian Football Center, the demolition and construction of the west stand began. The planned capacity of the stadium was to be 10,000 places. Ultimately, it has 3,764.

The Subcarpathian Football Center opened in 2020. In the first match at the new stadium, on 29 February 2020, Stal drew 0–0 against Bytovia Bytów (it was also the inauguration of artificial lighting). During the 2020–21 season, Stal Stalowa Wola was supposed to share the stadium with the I liga side Resovia, because their home stadium in Rzeszów was being renovated then. On October 23, 2020, the latter team decided to play at the Stal Rzeszów Municipal Stadium.

In April 2021, the stadium hosted the regional Polish Cup final – Stal Stalowa Wola 0–0 (p. 6–5) Siarka Tarnobrzeg game.

On 1 December 2023, the stadium hosted a 2023–24 UEFA Women's Nations League fixture in which Poland defeated Ukraine 1–0, securing promotion to League A.

In 2025, PCPN was one of the stadiums for the UEFA Women's Under-19 Championship. Three group stage matches and one semifinal were played there.

== National team tournaments ==
In March and April 2020, the stadium was scheduled to host matches of the UEFA Development Tournament. The participating teams were to include the Poland U-16, Venezuela U-16, Iceland U-16, and Iran U-16. However, on 18 March 2020, the tournament was canceled due to the COVID-19 pandemic and the associated epidemiological threat in Poland.

== Notable games ==
Event	Date	Home team	Result	Away team	Attendance
First game, first II liga match	29 February 2020	Stal Stalowa Wola	0–0	Bytovia Bytów	3 345
Record attendance, first international match	27 September 2022	Poland U-20	3–1	Portugal U-20	4 282
First III liga, group IV match	23 August 2020	Stal Stalowa Wola	4–3	Wólczanka Wólka Pełkińska	500
First international women's match	1 December 2023	Ukraine	0–1	Poland	1 944

== Tenants ==
The regular tenant is Stal Stalowa Wola.

On 8 February 2021, it was announced that PCPN will host home games of II liga club Stal Rzeszów, due to the renovation of the Rzeszów Municipal Stadium. They played here fixtures against Pogoń Siedlce (1–5), Znicz Pruszków (1–0), Błękitni Stargard (2–2), Garbarnia Kraków and KKS 1925 Kalisz.

On 27 February 2021, the PCPN training pitch hosted the III liga game – Wólczanka Wólka Pełkińska (serving as a host) were defeated 0–1 by Wisła Puławy. On 7 March 2021, the III liga Sokół Sieniawa game against Wólczanka was also played on the training pitch.
