= Błękitni Kielce =

Polish sports club

- Full name: Gwardyjski Klub Sportowy; Błękitni Kielce
- Founded: 10 May 1945; 80 years ago (as KS Partyzant Kielce)
- Dissolved: 1999; 27 years ago

Błękitni Kielce is a Polish defunct sports club, established in 1945 in Kielce.

In 1949, it became supported by Kielce's office of communist police (milicja), its official name was changed into Gwardyjski Klub Sportowy Błękitni Kielce and hues were red-white-blue, like in other sports clubs affiliated with milicja. Enjoying support of both milicja and Urząd Bezpieczeństwa, Błękitni became the major sports organization in the area of Kielce, however, their football team never managed to win promotion to the top-flight. They played their last games in the III liga in the 1998–99 season, then it was merged with a local rival, Korona Kielce.
