= Stal Stalowa Wola =

Association football club based in Stalowa Wola, Poland

- Full name: Stal Stalowa Wola Piłkarska Spółka Akcyjna (Stal Stalowa Wola Football Joint-Stock Company)
- Nicknames: Stalówka (the Nib); Hutnicy (the Steelworkers)
- Founded: 1938; 88 years ago as Klub Sportowy Stalowa Wola (Sports Club Stalowa Wola)
- Ground: Subcarpathian Football Center
- Capacity: 3,764
- Chairman: Marcin Łopatka
- Manager: Mariusz Arczewski
- League: II liga
- 2025–26: II liga, 10th of 18
- Website: stal1938.pl
Home colours	Away colours

Stal Stalowa Wola Piłkarska Spółka Akcyjna, commonly referred to as Stal Stalowa Wola (Polish pronunciation: [ˈstal staˈlɔva ˈvɔla]), is a Polish professional football club based in Stalowa Wola, Subcarpathian Voivodeship. Founded in 1938, they compete in the 2026–27 II liga, the third tier of Polish football, following successive promotions from the 2022–23 III liga and 2023–24 II liga, then the 2024–25 I liga relegation.

Stal's greatest success are 12th place in the 1993–94 Ekstraklasa, 1990–91 I liga championship and the quarter-final of the 1991–92 Polish Cup. It is the fourth best team in the history of the I liga, second professional association football division.

Since the spring round of the 2019–20 season, Stalowa Wola has played its home games at the 3,764-capacity Subcarpathian Football Center. Previously the team had played at the MOSiR Stadium from the 1930s, when the stadium was built. The club has a long-standing rivalry with Siarka Tarnobrzeg, and matches between the two sides are known as the great derby of Subcarpathia.

The club's traditional colours are green and black, and the club is known as Stalówka and Hutnicy (Steelworkers). At the beginning of its existence, it was associated with the Huta Stalowa Wola. In May 2010, a joint-stock sport company was built up under the name "Stal Stalowa Wola Piłkarska Spółka Akcyjna". It is the lawful successor and continuator of the "ZKS Stal Stalowa Wola" tradition. In July 2018, the city of Stalowa Wola took over the club's majority stake.

== History ==
In 1938, Feliks Olszak, who served as the director of Huta Stalowa Wola, founded Klub Sportowy Stalowa Wola (''Sports Club Stalowa Wola''). At that time, the club possessed a pitch devoid of running tracks and stands, and its players were purely amateurs. Training sessions were scheduled post work hours, with matches held exclusively on Sundays. The inaugural match occurred on 4 May 4, 1939, coinciding with Saint Florian's Day, the patron saint of steelworkers.

Post-World War II, the club resumed its operations. Stal emerged victorious in the 1953 season of Klasa A (4th level). This triumph marked the first elevation of footballers from Stalowa Wola to the II liga (2nd level) in 1973, under the guidance of Jerzy Kopa. The team remained in the second league until 1987, when they secured promotion to Ekstraklasa following a play-off victory against Górnik Knurów. Stal Stalowa Wola featured in Ekstraklasa during the subsequent seasons: 987–88, 1991–92, 1993–94 and 1994–95. Notable achievements of Stal include reaching the quarter-finals of the Polish Cup in the 1991–92 edition.

Following their triumph in the 2001–02 II liga (fourth group), Stal ascended to the I liga. However, in their debut season at the higher tier, they finished fifteenth, landing in the relegation zone. Stal made a reappearance at this level in 2006 but descended to the third tier after the 2009–10 season of I liga, securing the penultimate position in the league, ahead of only Motor Lublin. In the 2009–10 Polish Cup edition, Stal advanced to the round of 16, notably eliminating the defending champion Lech Poznań, featuring Robert Lewandowski in their squad, in a penalty shootout (0–0, p. 4–1). From 2010 to 2020, Stal maintained a consistent presence in the II liga.

The 2019–20 II liga season began severely for the Subcarpathian team – they had one point in the initial five matches. After the loss to Błękitni Stargard (0–1), the coach Paweł Wtorek resigned. He was replaced by Szymon Szydełko, who was unable to turn around the club's fortunes. Stalówka finished the season in 15th, thus becoming relegated to III liga. Szydełko stayed at the club, beginning another season with a victory in the Polish Cup over the II liga side Skra Częstochowa (3–1 win). On October 31, 2020, after the 0–3 loss to Wisła Puławy, Szymon Szydełko was released from his contract (at the time of his release, Stal was sixth, 18 points behind to first place). On November 4, 2020, Jaromir Wieprzęć was announced as his successor. They were not able to win the promotion back the following season, finding themselves remaining in the fourth-tier III liga.

In the 2022–23 season, Stal won the Polish Cup of the Subcarpathian Voivodeship and were promoted to the II liga – securing promotion in the penultimate round by winning 7–0 over Wisła Sandomierz and reaching a six-point lead over Avia Świdnik.

Stal Stalowa Wola achieved back-to-back promotions through the play-offs in the 2023–24 season. Their 2–1 victory over KKS 1925 Kalisz in the play-off final marked their return to the second tier after a 14-year absence. However, despite their efforts, the team was relegated back to the third tier with two matches remaining in the 2024–25 I liga season.

== Naming history ==
- 1938–1944 – Klub Sportowy Stalowa Wola (Sports Club Stalowa Wola)
- 1944–1947 – Związkowy Klub Sportowy Stalowa Wola (Association Sports Club Stalowa Wola)
- 1947–1949 – Związkowy Klub Sportowy Metal Stalowa Wola (Association Sports Club Metal Stalowa Wola)
- 1949–1952 – Związkowy Klub Sportowy Stal Stalowa Wola (Association Sports Club Stalowa Wola)
- 1952–1957 – Koło Sportowe Stalowa Wola (The Sports Network Stalowa Wola)
- 1957–1958 – Międzyzakładowy Klub Sportowy Stal Stalowa Wola, in short MKS Stal Stalowa Wola
- 1958–2010 – Zakładowy Klub Sportowy Stal Stalowa Wola, in short ZKS Stal Stalowa Wola
- 2010–current – Stal Stalowa Wola Piłkarska Spółka Akcyjna (Stal Stalowa Wola Football Joint Stock Company), in short Stal Stalowa Wola P.S.A.

== Stadium ==
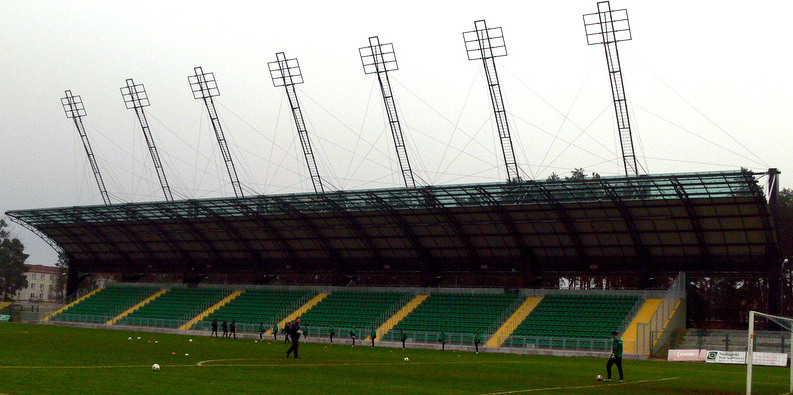
Subcarpathian Football Center

Stal Stalowa Wola plays its home matches at the Subcarpathian Football Center at the Hutnicza 10a Street. It opened in 2020 and has been the home stadium of Stal Stalowa Wola since its completion. The stadium has lighting and a heated pitch. It holds 3,764 people (including 258 seats for visitors fans). In the first match at the new stadium, on 29 February 2020, Stal drew 0–0 with Bytovia Bytów (it was also the inauguration of artificial lighting).

== Honours ==
- I liga
  - Champions: 1990–91
- Polish Cup
  - Quarter-finalists: 1991–92

August 1991 Third round	Unia Tarnów	1–4	Stal Stalowa Wola	Tarnów
		RSSSF

September 1991 1/16 finals	Stal Stalowa Wola	2–1	Śląsk Wrocław	Stalowa Wola
		RSSSF		Stadium: MOSiR Stadium

11 November 1991 1/8 finals	Stal Stalowa Wola	2–0	Ruch Chorzów	Stalowa Wola
	Jaskulski 56'; Brytan 82'	RSSSF		Stadium: MOSiR Stadium

18 March 1992 Quarter-finals first leg	Stilon Gorzów Wielkopolski	0–0	Stal Stalowa Wola	Gorzów Wielkopolski
		RSSSF		Referee: Krzysztof Perek (Poznań)

1 April 1992 Quarter-finals second leg	Stal Stalowa Wola	0–1 (0–1 agg.)	Stilon Gorzów Wielkopolski	Stalowa Wola
		RSSSF	Burzawa 56'	Stadium: MOSiR Stadium; Referee: Wit Żelazko (Warsaw)

- Subcarpathian Stalowa Wola Polish Cup:
  - Winners: 2020–21, 2021–22, 2022–23
- Subcarpathian Polish Cup:
  - Winners: 2021–22, 2022–23
  - Runners-up: 2020–21

== Players ==
=== Current squad ===
As of 15 September 2026

Note: Flags indicate national team as defined under FIFA eligibility rules; some limited exceptions apply. Players may hold more than one non-FIFA nationality.

No.	Pos.	Nation	Player
1	GK	POL	Krystian Harciński
3	DF	POL	Marcin Grabowski
4	DF	POL	Łukasz Furtak (captain)
5	DF	POL	Hubert Kędziora
6	DF	POL	Piotr Żemło
7	MF	POL	Mateusz Radecki
8	MF	POL	Kamil Kort
9	FW	POL	Jakub Jeleń
10	MF	POL	Maksymilian Hebel
11	MF	POL	Patryk Zaucha
13	DF	POL	Mateusz Solarz
16	MF	POL	Paweł Żyra
17	MF	POL	Hubert Tomalski
18	MF	CGO	Gédéon Nongo (on loan from Górnik Zabrze)
19	FW	POL	Dawid Wolny
21	DF	POL	Szymon Kwapisz

No.	Pos.	Nation	Player
23	MF	POL	Maciej Śliwa
28	GK	POL	Kamil Soberka (on loan from Górnik Zabrze)
30	MF	POL	Anthony Rogalski
33	GK	POL	Mikołaj Smyłek
44	MF	POL	Piotr Wójs
43	MF	POL	Jarosław Czerwik (on loan from Miedź Legnica)
44	DF	POL	Adam Chrzanowski
49	MF	POL	Jakub Saj
63	DF	POL	Kamil Książek
77	MF	POL	Dariusz Kamiński
87	MF	POL	Kuba Nawrocki (on loan from Widzew Łódź)
—	DF	POL	Bogumił Abramowicz
—	FW	GAM	Modou Keita (on loan from Miedź Legnica)
—	GK	POL	Szymon Madej
—	MF	POL	Kamil Opoka
—	MF	POL	Adrian Piotrowski

=== Out on loan ===
Note: Flags indicate national team as defined under FIFA eligibility rules; some limited exceptions apply. Players may hold more than one non-FIFA nationality.

No.	Pos.	Nation	Player
22	DF	POL	Antoni Łukawski (at Czarni Połaniec until 30 June 2027)

=== Notable players ===
Players who have been capped, including national youth football teams.

- (Poland) Waldemar Adamczyk
- (Poland) Józef Dankowski
- (Egypt) Mohamed Essam
- (Poland) Michał Janicki
- (Montenegro) Danko Kovačević
- (Burkina Faso) Préjuce Nakoulma
- (Poland) Maciej Nalepa
- (Hungary) (Poland) Rezső Patkoló (Rudolf Patkolo)
- (Poland) Piotr Piechniak
- (Poland) Dawid Pietrzkiewicz
- (Poland) Kacper Śpiewak
- (Poland) Sebastian Zalepa

Players who have played in the team of the Stal Stalowa Wola's stars against the Wisła Kraków's stars in 2017. (Note: The game was played on the occasion of the thirty-year anniversary of the first promotion of Stal Stalowa Wola to Ekstraklasa.)

- (Poland) Wojciech Niemiec
- (Poland) Mirosław Mścisz
- (Poland) Wiesław Pędlowski
- (Poland) Paweł Rybak
- (Poland) Artur Kopeć
- (Poland) Jerzy Zygarek
- (Poland) Mieczysław Ożóg
- (Poland) Dariusz Michalak
- (Poland) Paweł Szafran
- (Poland) Marek Kusiak
- (Poland) Arkadiusz Bilski
- (Poland) Janusz Góreczny
- (Poland) Dariusz Bartnik
- (Poland) Piotr Piechniak
- (Poland) Marek Drozd
- (Poland) Daniel Radawiec
- (Poland) Dariusz Brytan
- (Poland) Antoni Fijarczyk

== Coaching staff ==
As of 24 October 2026

Manager	(Poland) Mariusz Arczewski
Assistant coach	(Poland) Marcin Kozior
Assistant coach	(Poland) Adrian Machaj
Goalkeeping coach Team manager	(Poland) Tomasz Wietecha
Fitness coach	(Poland) Radosław Turek
Match analyst	(Poland) Adrian Golik
Physiotherapist	(Poland) Anna Galant

=== Coaches over the years ===
List of coaches
2014–2016	(Poland) Jaromir Wieprzęć
2016	(Poland) Andrzej Kasiak
2016	(Poland) Ryszard Kuźma
2016–2017	(Poland) Rafał Wójcik
2017	(Poland) Janusz Białek
2017–2018	(Poland) Krzysztof Łętocha
2018	(Poland) Tadeusz Krawiec
2018	(Poland) Jaromir Wieprzęć
2018	(Poland) Krzysztof Łętocha
2018–2019	(Poland) Wojciech Fabianowski
2019	(Poland) Paweł Wtorek
2019	(Poland) Czesław Palik
2019–2020	(Poland) Szymon Szydełko
2020–2021	(Poland) Jaromir Wieprzęć
2021	(Poland) Damian Skakuj
2021	(Poland) Roland Thomas
2021–2022	(Poland) Łukasz Bereta
2022–2023	(Poland) Łukasz Surma
2023–2025	(Poland) Ireneusz Pietrzykowski
2025	(Poland) Maciej Jarosz (caretaker)
2025	(Poland) Marcin Płuska
2025–2026	(Poland) Maciej Musiał
2026	(Poland) Dariusz Kantor
2026	(Poland) Przemysław Cecherz
2026	(Poland) Jarosław Skrobacz
2026–	(Poland) Mariusz Arczewski

== Records ==
=== All-time records ===
- Ekstraklasa: 55th (103 points reached) – as of 23.08.2025
- I liga: 6th (1339 points reached) – as of 23.08.2025

=== Ekstraklasa records ===
- Number of seasons: 4
- First game: 0–1 (H) v Zagłębie Lubin (August 9, 1987)
- Biggest win: 4–0 (A) v Igloopol Dębica (November 23, 1991)
- Biggest defeat: 0–6 (A) v Górnik Zabrze (August 27, 1994)
- Longest series of victories: 2 (three times)
- Longest series of defeats: 4 (two times)
- Highest attendance at the MOSiR Stadium: 12,000 v Legia Warsaw 1–0 (October 30, 1994)

(H) – Home; (A) – Away

=== Polish Cup records ===
The following list is not complete.

Season	Round	Club	Home	Away
1991–92	3R	Unia Tarnów	—N/a	4–1
1991–92	4R	Śląsk Wrocław	2–1	—N/a
1991–92	1/8	Ruch Chorzów	2–0	—N/a
1991–92	QF	Stilon Gorzów Wielkopolski	0–1	0–0
1992–93	4R	Polger Police	—N/a	0–1
1993–94	2R	Radomiak Radom	—N/a	1–1 (3–5 p)
1994–95	4R	Bełchatów	—N/a	1–0
1994–95	1/8	Raków Częstochowa	0–2	—N/a
2008–09	2R	Bełchatów	1–0	—N/a
2008–09	1/8	Stal Sanok	—N/a	0–2
2009–10	1R	Wisła Płock	2–1	—N/a
2009–10	2R	Lech Poznań	0–0 (4–1 p)	—N/a
2009–10	1/8	Zagłębie Sosnowiec	—N/a	0–3
2010–11	EPR	Concordia	—N/a	1–2
2011–12	EPR	Puszcza Niepołomice	—N/a	1–1 (3–5 p)
2013–14	EPR	Czarni Rokitki II	—N/a	4–2
2013–14	PR	Raków Częstochowa	2–0	—N/a
2013–14	1R	Cracovia	1–0	—N/a
2013–14	2R	Śląsk Wrocław	1–3	—N/a
2014–15	1PR	KS Polkowice	—N/a	3–2
2014–15	2PR	Sparta Jazgarzew	—N/a	5–2
2014–15	1R	Olimpia Grudziądz	2–0	—N/a
2014–15	2R	Lechia Gdańsk	2–1	—N/a
2014–15	1/8	Śląsk Wrocław	0–1	—N/a
2015–16	PR	Grunwald Ruda Śląska	—N/a	4–2
2015–16	1R	Stilon Gorzów Wielkopolski	—N/a	1–0
2015–16	2R	Piast Gliwice	2–2 (3–0 p)	—N/a
2015–16	1/8	Zawisza Bydgoszcz	1–2	—N/a
2016–17	PR	Radomiak Radom	—N/a	0–4
2017–18	PR	Polonia Bytom	—N/a	3–0 (Note: Awarded. Polonia Bytom withdrew from the competition.)
2017–18	1R	Sokół Ostróda	—N/a	1–2
2018–19	PR	Legionovia Legionowo	2–3	—N/a
2019–20	1R	Chemik Police	—N/a	4–0
2019–20	2R	Katowice	0–0 (4–3 p)	—N/a
2019–20	1/8	Lech Poznań	0–2	—N/a
2020–21	PR	Skra Częstochowa	—N/a	3–1
2020–21	1R	Lechia Gdańsk	0–4	—N/a
2020–21	RGN	Olimpia Pysznica	—N/a	8–1
2020–21	RGN	Tanew Wólka Tanewska	—N/a	2–0
2020–21	RGN	Sparta Jeżowe	—N/a	2–0
2020–21	RGN	Siarka Tarnobrzeg	0–0 (6–5 p)	—N/a
2020–21	RGN	Karpaty Krosno	—N/a	2–0
2020–21	RGN	Wisłoka Dębica	0–1	—N/a
2021–22	RGN	Stal Gorzyce	—N/a	4–1
2021–22	RGN	Siarka Tarnobrzeg	2–2 (4–3 p)	—N/a
2021–22	RGN	Sokół Kamień	—N/a	1–0
2021–22	RGN	LZS Zdziary	—N/a	4–1
2021–22	RGN	JKS Jarosław	—N/a	1–0
2021–22	RGN	Karpaty Krosno	—N/a	3–0
2022–23	1R	Puszcza Niepołomice	1–2	—N/a
2022–23	RGN	Łęg Stany	—N/a	9–1
2022–23	RGN	Stal Gorzyce	—N/a	3–0
2022–23	RGN	Sparta Jeżowe	—N/a	7–0
2022–23	RGN	Sokół Kamień	—N/a	2–0
2022–23	RGN	Cosmos Nowotaniec	—N/a	1–0
2022–23	RGN	Sokół Sieniawa	—N/a	1–0
2023–24	1R	Znicz Pruszków	2–0	—N/a
2023–24	2R	Carina Gubin	—N/a	0–1
2024–25	PR	Olimpia Elbląg	4–2	—N/a
2024–25	1R	Arka Gdynia	2–2 (2–3 p)	—N/a
2025–26	PR	Skra Częstochowa	3–1	—N/a
2025–26	1R	KS Goczałkowice-Zdrój II	—N/a	1–3
2026–27	PR	Śląsk Wrocław II	—N/a	2–3

Notes

- RGN: Regional competitions level (Note: There are organized by the Subcarpathian Football Association (regional authority of the Polish Football Association) for the III liga teams and below. The winner of the regional competitions level gains the right to participate in the central level competition next season.)
- 1PR: First preliminary round
- 2PR: Second preliminary round
- EPR: Extra preliminary round
- PR: Preliminary round
- 1R: First round
- 2R: Second round
- 3R: Third round
- 4R: Fourth round
- 1/8: 1/8 finals
- QF: Quarter-finals

== Stal's places in Ekstraklasa ==
=== 1987–88 ===
Pos	Team	Pld	W	3W	D	3L	L	GF	GA	GD	Pts	Qualification or relegation
12	Lechia Gdańsk (R)	30	6	0	14	0	10	18	26	−8	26	Qualification to Relegation playoffs
13	Olimpia Poznań	30	5	2	11	3	9	36	46	−10	24	Qualification to Relegation playoffs
14	Górnik Wałbrzych	30	5	1	11	0	13	24	36	−12	24	Qualification to Relegation playoffs
15	Bałtyk Gdynia (R)	30	8	1	6	4	11	27	41	−14	21	Relegated to II liga
16	Stal Stalowa Wola (R)	30	5	1	9	6	9	31	56	−25	16	Relegated to II liga

Source: 90minut.pl (in Polish)
Rules for classification: 1st points; 2nd goal difference; 3rd goals scored. 1 extra point for each win with a goal difference of 3 or more, and 1 point deducted for each loss with a goal difference of 3 or more.
(R) Relegated

=== 1991–92 ===
Pos	Team	Pld	W	D	L	GF	GA	GD	Pts	Qualification or relegation
14	Olimpia Poznań	34	8	15	11	34	41	−7	31	
15	Motor Lublin (R)	34	9	12	13	33	40	−7	30	Relegated to II liga
16	Stal Stalowa Wola (R)	34	8	12	14	23	33	−10	28	Relegated to II liga
17	Zagłębie Sosnowiec (R)	34	6	12	16	28	50	−22	24	Relegated to II liga
18	Igloopol Dębica (R)	34	2	7	25	15	76	−61	11	Relegated to II liga

Source: 90minut.pl (in Polish)
(R) Relegated

=== 1993–94 ===
Pos	Team	Pld	W	D	L	GF	GA	GD	Pts
10	Miliarder Pniewy	34	11	11	12	41	40	+1	33
11	Stal Mielec	34	11	9	14	32	45	−13	31
12	Stal Stalowa Wola	34	8	14	12	40	47	−7	30
13	Zagłębie Lubin	34	9	12	13	25	37	−12	30
14	Warta Poznań	34	11	8	15	32	45	−13	30

Source: 90minut.pl (in Polish)

=== 1994–95 ===
Pos	Team	Pld	W	D	L	GF	GA	GD	Pts	Qualification or relegation
14	Stomil Olsztyn	34	7	16	11	35	40	−5	30	
15	Petrochemia Płock (R)	34	8	14	12	35	42	−7	30	Relegated to II liga
16	Stal Stalowa Wola (R)	34	10	9	15	34	47	−13	29	Relegated to II liga
17	Ruch Chorzów (R)	34	7	15	12	39	46	−7	29	Relegated to II liga
18	Warta Poznań (R)	34	7	5	22	35	75	−40	19	Relegated to II liga

Source: 90minut.pl (in Polish)
(R) Relegated

== Supporters ==
Stal Stalowa Wola fans have a friendship with supporters of GKS Jastrzębie, Łada Biłgoraj, Polonia Przemyśl, Sokół Nisko and Stal Rzeszów. Stal's major rivals are Hutnik Kraków, Korona Kielce, KSZO Ostrowiec Świętokrzyski, Motor Lublin, Siarka Tarnobrzeg and Stal Mielec. The team's fan group is called "Stalówka The Firm". In 2020 officially begun a friendship with Ultras of Italian giants Inter Curva Nord Milano.

== Derbies ==
There are games between Stal and Siarka Tarnobrzeg (called the great derby of Subcarpathia), Motor Lublin (called the east derby) and KSZO Ostrowiec Świętokrzyski (called the metallurgical derby).

=== Between Stal and Siarka ===
As of 26 September 2020 (last game)

Matches	Stal wins	Remis	Siarka wins
47	19	16	12

=== Between Stal and Motor ===
As of 8 March 2014 (last game)

Matches	Stal wins	Remis	Motor wins
28	13	7	8

=== Between Stal and KSZO ===
As of 30 September 2020 (last game)

Matches	Stal wins	Remis	KSZO wins
17	7	5	5

== Stal Stalowa Wola II ==
Stal Stalowa Wola II
- Founded: 2012
- Ground: Subcarpathian Football Center (training pitch)
- League: Regional league Stalowa Wola
- 2025–26: Regional league Stalowa Wola, 3rd of 15

Stal Stalowa Wola II is a Polish football team, which serves as the reserve side of Stal Stalowa Wola. Reactivated in 2012, they started in the B class and won the championship in their debut season (2012–13). From 2019 to 2021, they competed in the IV league but were relegated to the regional league in 2021. They play their home matches at the training pitch of the Subcarpathian Football Center.
