= Pogoń 1945 Staszów =

Polish football club

- Full name: Miejski Klub Sportowy Pogoń 1945 Staszów
- Founded: 1945; 80 years ago (as KS Przyczółek Staszów)
- Ground: Municipal Stadium
- Capacity: 2,000
- Chairman: Zbigniew Snopkiewicz
- Manager: Damian Krakowiak
- League: IV liga Świętokrzyskie
- 2023–24: IV liga Świętokrzyskie, 15th of 18

MKS Pogoń 1945 Staszów is a Polish football club from Staszów. The club's greatest achievement so far is a third-place finish in the III liga (currently II liga) in the 2000–01 season, and the 2000–01 Polish Cup participation.

== Previous names ==
- KS Przyczółek Staszów (1945–53)
- KS Unia Staszów (1953-50/60s)
- KS Start Staszów (1950/60s–60s)
- KS Pogoń Staszów (1960s–2005)
- MKS Olimpia Pogoń Staszów (2005–06)
- MKS Pogoń 1945 Staszów (2006–current)
