= JKS Jarosław =

Polish football club

- Full name: Klub Sportowy JKS Jarosław
- Founded: 5 July 1909; 116 years ago (as Pogoń Jarosław)
- Ground: JKS Stadium
- Capacity: 2,074
- Chairman: Gracjan Dziukiewicz
- Manager: Valeriy Sokolenko
- League: III liga, group IV
- 2025–26: IV liga Subcarpathia, 1st of 18 (promoted)
- Website: www.czarno-niebiescy.pl
Home colours

JKS Jarosław is a Polish football club based in Jarosław. They currently play in group IV of the III liga, the fourth tier of the Polish football league, after winning the 2025–26 IV liga Subcarpathia.

== History ==
JKS Jarosław was officially formed in 1909 as Pogoń Jarosław, and entered the Eastern Galicia league several years later. After World War I the club changed its name to JKS Jarosłavia. In 1938, JKS Jarosłavia was changed to JKS Jarosław. On 25 May 1947, the new stadium was opened. To celebrate the opening of the stadium, JKS Jarosław played a friendly against Wisła Kraków, and Polonia Przemyśl. In 1962, JKS Jarosław played in the third tier of the Polish football league system, and achieved a club record highest league finish of second position.
