= IV liga Subcarpathia =

- Organising body: Subcarpathian Football Association
- Founded: 2000; 26 years ago
- Country: Poland
- Number of clubs: 18
- Level on pyramid: 5
- Promotion to: III liga, group IV
- Relegation to: Liga okręgowa
- Current champions: JKS Jarosław (2nd title) (2025–26)
- Most championships: 7 clubs (2 titles each)

IV liga Subcarpathia group (grupa podkarpacka) is one of the groups of IV liga, the fifth level of Polish football league system.

The league was created in the 2000–01 season, after a new administrative division of Poland was implemented. Until the end of the 2007–08 season, IV liga was the fourth tier of league system, but this was changed with the formation of the Ekstraklasa as the top level league in Poland.

The clubs from Subcarpathian Voivodeship compete in this group. The winner of the league is promoted to III liga, group IV. The bottom teams are relegated to the groups of the regional league from Subcarpathian Voivodeship. These groups are Dębica, Jarosław, Krosno, Rzeszów and Stalowa Wola.

== League champions ==
Season	Level	Champion	Runner-up	Third place
Promotion to III liga, group IV:
2000–01	IV	Pogoń Leżajsk	Stal Mielec	Górnovia Górno
2001–02	IV	Stal Rzeszów	Czarni 1910 Jasło	Resovia
2002–03	IV	Resovia	Pogoń Leżajsk	Stal Sanok
2003–04	IV	Pogoń Leżajsk	Czarni 1910 Jasło	Stal Sanok
2004–05	IV	Stal Sanok	Wisłoka Dębica	Unia Nowa Sarzyna
2005–06	IV	Wisłoka Dębica	Izolator Boguchwała	Igloopol Dębica
2006–07	IV	Resovia	Siarka Tarnobrzeg	Kolbuszowianka Kolbuszowa
Promotion to II liga East:
2007–08	IV	Izolator Boguchwała (Note: Izolator Boguchwała did not advance to the East group of the new II liga after losing play-offs.)	Unia Nowa Sarzyna	Orzeł Przeworsk
Promotion to III liga Lublin-Subcarpathia:
2008–09	V	Stal Sanok	Siarka Tarnobrzeg	Polonia Przemyśl
2009–10	V	Partyzant Targowiska	Polonia Przemyśl	Orzeł Przeworsk
2010–11	V	KS Zaczernie	Strumyk Malawa	Czarni 1910 Jasło
2011–12	V	Czarni 1910 Jasło	Orzeł Przeworsk	Resovia II
2012–13	V	JKS 1909 Jarosław	Sokół Sieniawa	Piast Tuczempy
2013–14	V	Wólczanka Wólka Pełkińska	Wisłoka Dębica	Cosmos Nowotaniec
2014–15	V	Polonia Przemyśl	Piast Tuczempy	Cosmos Nowotaniec
Promotion to III liga, group IV:
2015–16	V	Cosmos Nowotaniec	Sokół Nisko	Crasnovia Krasne
2016–17	V	Wólczanka Wólka Pełkińska	Izolator Boguchwała	Sokół Sieniawa
2017–18	V	Sokół Sieniawa	Izolator Boguchwała	Wisłoka Dębica
2018–19	V	Wisłoka Dębica	Izolator Boguchwała	Polonia Przemyśl
2019–20 (Note: By the decision of the Subcarpathian Football Association of 8 May 2020, due to the epidemic situation related to the COVID-19 coronavirus in Poland, the 2019–20 season games ended after 18 rounds were played.)	V	KS Wiązownica	Korona Rzeszów	Stal Mielec II
2020–21	V	Korona Rzeszów	Izolator Boguchwała	Karpaty Krosno
2021–22	V	KS Wiązownica	JKS 1909 Jarosław	Izolator Boguchwała
2022–23	V	Cosmos Nowotaniec	Karpaty Krosno (Note: Karpaty Krosno won promotion after Cosmos Nowotaniec withdrew their intent to compete in the III liga.)	Stal Łańcut
2023–24	V	Pogoń-Sokół Lubaczów	Cosmos Nowotaniec	Stal Łańcut
2024–25	V	Sokół Kolbuszowa Dolna	JKS 1909 Jarosław	Igloopol Dębica
2025–26	V	JKS Jarosław	Izolator Boguchwała	Cosmos Nowotaniec

== See also ==
- Lwów District League, regional league before 1939 (World War II)
