= 2019–20 Stal Stalowa Wola season =

Stal Stalowa Wola
2019–20 season
- Manager: Paweł Wtorek (until the Matchday 6); Szymon Szydełko (from the Matchday 7)
- Stadium: Izo Arena, Boguchwała (until the Matchday 20); Podkarpackie Centrum Piłki Nożnej, Stalowa Wola (from the Matchday 21)
- II liga: 15th (relegated)
- Polish Cup: Round of 16
- Top goalscorer: League: Michał Fidziukiewicz (10); All: Michał Fidziukiewicz (12)
- Highest home attendance: 3,345 v Bytovia Bytów; II liga, 29 February 2020
- Lowest home attendance: 0 v Olimpia Elbląg (Note: Due to the COVID-19 pandemic restrictions.); II liga, 3 June 2020 and 3 more
- Biggest win: 5–1 v Elana; 4–0 v Chemik
- Biggest defeat: 1–4 v Znicz & Bytovia; 0-3 v Górnik, Widzew & Pogoń
Home colours	Away colours
- All statistics correct as of 25 July 2020.

The 2019–20 season was Stal Stalowa Wola's tenth consecutive season in II liga since relegation from I liga in 2010. In addition to the domestic league, Stal participated in this season's edition of the Polish Cup. The season was slated to cover a period from 27 July 2019 to 30 May 2020. It was extended extraordinarily beyond 30 June due to the COVID-19 pandemic in Poland. In the end, Stal got relegated to III liga in spite of seven wins in the league at the last season's eleven games. The bad start and last matchday's defeat at Pogoń Siedlce confirmed the relegation.

== Players ==
As of 25 July 2020

Note: Flags indicate national team as defined under FIFA eligibility rules; some limited exceptions apply. Players may hold more than one non-FIFA nationality.

No.	Pos.	Nation	Player
—	GK	POL	Matthew Korziewicz
—	GK	POL	Dawid Pietrzkiewicz
—	GK	POL	Maciej Siudak
—	DF	POL	Mateusz Hudzik
—	DF	POL	Szymon Jarosz
—	DF	POL	Krzysztof Kiersz
—	DF	POL	Bartosz Sobotka
—	DF	POL	Adam Waszkiewicz
—	DF	POL	Piotr Witasik
—	MF	POL	Dominik Chromiński
—	MF	POL	Bartłomiej Ciepiela
—	MF	POL	Szymon Jopek
—	MF	POL	Patryk Marut

No.	Pos.	Nation	Player
—	MF	POL	Piotr Mroziński
—	MF	POL	Dominik Ochał
—	MF	POL	Kacper Piotrowski
—	MF	POL	Michał Płonka
—	MF	POL	Przemysław Stelmach
—	MF	POL	Wiktor Stępniowski
—	MF	POL	Filip Szifer
—	MF	POL	Piotr Zmorzyński
—	FW	POL	Michał Fidziukiewicz
—	FW	POL	Tomasz Płonka
—	FW	POL	Adrian Szczutowski
—	FW	POL	Kacper Śpiewak
—	FW	POL	Bartosz Tłuczek

== Transfers ==
=== In ===
Pos	Player	Moving from	Transfer window	Source
MF	(Poland) Bartłomiej Ciepiela	Legia Warsaw II (loan)	Summer	
FW	(Poland) Michał Fidziukiewicz	Olimpia Elbląg	Summer	
DF	(Poland) Krzysztof Kiercz	Stal Mielec	Summer	
MF	(Poland) Rafał Michalik	Czarni Połaniec	Summer	
MF	(Poland) Kacper Piotrowski	Stal Stalowa Wola II	Summer	
MF	(Poland) Michał Płonka	Rozwój Katowice	Summer	
DF	(Poland) Piotr Witasik	Olimpia Grudziądz	Summer	
MF	(Poland) Filip Wójcik	Garbarnia Kraków	Summer	
FW	(Poland) Łukasz Zjawiński	Legia Warsaw II (loan)	Summer	
MF	(Poland) Dominik Chromiński	Stal Rzeszów	Winter	
DF	(Poland) Mateusz Chudzik	(Italy) Monterosi FC	Winter	
GK	(Poland) Matthew Korziewicz	Sokół Sieniawa	Winter	
MF	(Poland) Dominik Ochał	Sokół Sieniawa	Winter	
GK	(Poland) Dawid Pietrzkiewicz	Raków Częstochowa	Winter	
FW	(Poland) Tomasz Płonka	Stal Rzeszów	Winter	
FW	(Poland) Adrian Szczutowski	Wisła Płock (loan)	Winter	
FW	(Poland) Bartosz Tłuczek	Stal Stalowa Wola II	Winter	
MF	(Poland) Piotr Zmorzyński	Wisła Puławy	Winter	

=== Out ===
Pos	Player	Moving to	Transfer window	Source
DF	(Poland) Kacper Czajkowski	Foto-Higiena Gać	Summer	
MF	(Poland) Karol Dziopak	Stal Stalowa Wola II	Summer	
MF	(Poland) Adrian Dziubiński	CWKS Resovia	Summer	
DF	(Poland) Bartosz Grasza	Łada Biłgoraj	Summer	
DF	(Poland) Grzegorz Janiszewski	GKS Katowice	Summer	
MF	(Poland) Michał Kitliński	(Italy) A.C. Este	Summer	
FW	(Poland) Sebastian Łętocha	Smoczanka Mielec	Summer	
DF	(Poland) Fryderyk Stasiak	Miedź Legnica	Summer	
MF	(Poland) Michał Trąbka	ŁKS Łódź	Summer	
FW	(Poland) Andrzej Trubeha	KKS 1925 Kalisz	Summer	
MF	(Poland) Maciej Wieprzęć	Sokół Nisko	Summer	
MF	(Poland) Robert Dadok	Stal Mielec	Winter	
GK	(Poland) Krystian Kalinowski	Motor Lublin	Winter	
GK	(Poland) Łukasz Konefał	GKS Katowice (loan)	Winter	
MF	(Poland) Rafał Michalik	Wisłoka Dębica (loan)	Winter	
MF	(Poland) Michał Mistrzyk	Wisła Sandomierz (loan)	Winter	
MF	(Poland) Łukasz Pietras	Wieczysta Kraków	Winter	
MF	(Poland) Filip Wójcik	Motor Lublin	Winter	
FW	(Poland) Łukasz Zjawiński	Legia Warsaw II	Winter	

== Pre-season and friendlies ==
22 June 2019 Friendly	Bruk-Bet Termalica Nieciecza	3–1	Stal Stalowa Wola	Nieciecza
11:00 CEST (UTC+2)	Gutkovskis 23'; Purece 32'; Kiełb 37'	90minut	Dadok 86'

29 June 2019 Friendly	Garbarnia Kraków	1–1	Stal Stalowa Wola	Kraków
11:00 CEST (UTC+2)	Piszczek 44'	90minut	Mistrzyk 83'

6 July 2019 Friendly	Górnik Łęczna	1–0	Stal Stalowa Wola	Łęczna
10:00 CEST (UTC+2)	Zagórski 90'	90minut

10 July 2019 Friendly	Stal Stalowa Wola	3–1	Wólczanka Wólka Pełkińska	Stalowa Wola
17:30 CEST (UTC+2)	Witasik 15'; Zjawiński 48'; Ciepiela 65'	90minut	Czelny 28'	Stadium: Stadion SAN Rozwadów

10 July 2019 Friendly	Stal Stalowa Wola	2–1	KSZO Ostrowiec Świętokrzyski	Stalowa Wola
10:00 CEST (UTC+2)	Fidziukiewicz 37'; M. Płonka 58'	90minut	Burzyński 88'	Stadium: Stadion SAN Rozwadów

16 July 2019 Friendly	Stal Stalowa Wola (Poland)	1–1	(Greece) AEK Athens	Nowiny
9:30 CEST (UTC+2)	Fidziukiewicz 43'	90minut	Mantalos 70'	Stadium: Stadion 100-lecia Odzyskania Niepodległości

19 July 2019 Friendly	Stal Stalowa Wola	4–0	Sokół Sieniawa	Stalowa Wola
11:30 CEST (UTC+2)		90minut

18 January 2020 Friendly	Stal Stalowa Wola	1–0	Wisła Sandomierz	Stalowa Wola
	T. Płonka 3'	Stal1938

25 January 2020 Friendly	Bruk-Bet Termalica Nieciecza	0–2	Stal Stalowa Wola	Nieciecza
		Stal1938	M. Płonka 55'; Zmorzyński 71'	Stadium: Stadion Sportowy Bruk-Bet Termalica

29 January 2020 Friendly	Stal Stalowa Wola	4–2	Korona Kielce II	Stalowa Wola
	T. Płonka 23'; Fidziukiewicz 28' (pen.); Jopek 32'; 70'	Stal1938	65'; 71'

1 February 2020 Friendly	Stal Stalowa Wola	2–0	Puszcza Niepołomice	Stalowa Wola
13:00 CET (UTC+1)	Tłuczek 82'; Mroziński 84' (pen.)	Stal1938

5 February 2020 Friendly	Stal Stalowa Wola	3–2	Sokół Sieniawa	Stalowa Wola
13:00 CET (UTC+1)	Jopek 12'; Stelmach 19'; M. Płonka 45'	Stal1938	Purcha 38'; Majda 73'

8 February 2020 Friendly	Stal Stalowa Wola	1–0	Górnik Łęczna	Stalowa Wola
13:00 CET (UTC+1)	Fidziukiewicz 41'	Stal1938

14 February 2020 Friendly	Stal Stalowa Wola	0–0	Podhale Nowy Targ	Stalowa Wola
13:00 CET (UTC+1)		Stal1938

22 February 2020 Friendly	Stal Stalowa Wola	0–3	CWKS Resovia	Stalowa Wola
12:00 CET (UTC+1)		Stal1938	Świderski 12'; Radulj 35'; Płatek 80'	Stadium: Stadion SAN Rozwadów

== Competitions ==
=== Overview ===
Competition	First match	Last match	Starting round	Final position	Record							
Competition	First match	Last match	Starting round	Final position	Pld	W	D	L	GF	GA	GD	Win %
II liga	27 July 2019	25 July 2020	Matchday 1	15th	34	13	7	14	45	49	−4	38.24
Polish Cup	25 September 2019	4 December 2019	First round	Round of 16	3	1	1	1	5	3	+2	33.33
Total					37	14	8	15	50	52	−2	37.84

Last updated: 25 July 2020
Source: Competitions

=== II liga ===
==== Standings ====
Pos	Team	Pld	W	D	L	GF	GA	GD	Pts	Promotion or Relegation
13	Lech Poznań II	34	12	11	11	49	47	+2	47 (Note: Head-to-head points (goal difference): Błękitni Stargard 7 (+4), Lech Poznań II 5 (-1), Skra Częstochowa 4 (-4))	
14	Skra Częstochowa	34	13	8	13	37	44	−7	47	
15	Stal Stalowa Wola (R)	34	13	7	14	45	49	−4	46	Relegation to III liga
16	Elana Toruń (R)	34	11	8	15	50	54	−4	41	Relegation to III liga
17	Legionovia Legionowo (R)	34	6	6	22	33	64	−31	24	Relegation to III liga

Source: Soccerway, 90minut.pl
Rules for classification: 1) Points; 2) Head-to-head points; 3) Head-to-head goal difference; 4) Head-to-head away goals scored (only if two teams); 5) Goal difference; 6) Goals scored; 7) fairplay ranking.
(R) Relegated

==== Results summary ====
Overall								Home						Away					
Pld	W	D	L	GF	GA	GD	Pts	W	D	L	GF	GA	GD	W	D	L	GF	GA	GD
34	13	7	14	45	49	−4	46	7	3	7	24	20	+4	6	4	7	21	29	−8

Last updated: 25 July 2020.
Source: 90minut.pl

==== Matches ====
1	Stal Stalowa Wola	1–3	CWKS Resovia	Boguchwała
				Stadium: Izo Arena; Attendance: 716

2	Znicz Pruszków	4–1	Stal Stalowa Wola	Pruszków
				Attendance: 390

3	Stal Stalowa Wola	0–0	Gryf Wejherowo	Boguchwała
				Stadium: Izo Arena; Attendance: 159

4	Bytovia Bytów	4–1	Stal Stalowa Wola	Bytów
				Attendance: 433

5	Stal Stalowa Wola	0–1	Błękitni Stargard	Boguchwała
				Stadium: Izo Arena; Attendance: 75

6	Olimpia Elbląg	0–1	Stal Stalowa Wola	Elbląg
				Attendance: 1,024

7	Stal Stalowa Wola	1–3	Górnik Łęczna	Boguchwała
				Stadium: Izo Arena; Attendance: 200

8	Skra Częstochowa	0–0	Stal Stalowa Wola	Częstochowa
				Referee: 312

9	Stal Rzeszów	2–1	Stal Stalowa Wola	Rzeszów
				Referee: 1,874

10	Legionovia Legionowo	0–1	Stal Stalowa Wola	Legionowo
				Attendance: 285

11	Garbarnia Kraków	1–3	Stal Stalowa Wola	Kraków
				Attendance: 357

12	Lech Poznań II	2–2	Stal Stalowa Wola	Wronki
				Attendance: 86

13	Górnik Polkowice	3–0	Stal Stalowa Wola	Polkowice
				Attendance: 380

14	Elana Toruń	1–1	Stal Stalowa Wola	Toruń
				Attendance: 400

15	Stal Stalowa Wola	0–1	Widzew Łódź	Boguchwała
				Stadium: Izo Arena; Attendance: 690

16	GKS Katowice	2–1	Stal Stalowa Wola	Katowice
				Attendance: 1,798

17	Pogoń Siedlce	1–2	Stal Stalowa Wola	Siedlce
				Attendance: 1,007

18	CWKS Resovia	3–2	Stal Stalowa Wola	Rzeszów
				Attendance: 1,685

19	Stal Stalowa Wola	2–1	Znicz Pruszków	Boguchwała
				Stadium: Izo Arena; Attendance: 50

20	Gryf Wejherowo	2–3	Stal Stalowa Wola	Wejherowo
				Attendance: 173

21	Stal Stalowa Wola	0–0	Bytovia Bytów	Stalowa Wola
				Stadium: Podkarpackie Centrum Piłki Nożnej; Attendance: 3,345

22	Błękitni Stargard	0–0	Stal Stalowa Wola	Stargard
				Attendance: 0

23	Stal Stalowa Wola	2–2	Olimpia Elbląg	Stalowa Wola
				Stadium: Podkarpackie Centrum Piłki Nożnej; Attendance: 0

24	Górnik Łęczna	1–2	Stal Stalowa Wola	Łęczna
				Attendance: 0

25	Stal Stalowa Wola	1–2	Skra Częstochowa	Stalowa Wola
				Stadium: Podkarpackie Centrum Piłki Nożnej; Attendance: 0

26	Stal Stalowa Wola	3–0	Stal Rzeszów	Stalowa Wola
				Stadium: Podkarpackie Centrum Piłki Nożnej; Attendance: 0

27	Stal Stalowa Wola	2–0	Legionovia Legionowo	Stalowa Wola
				Stadium: Podkarpackie Centrum Piłki Nożnej; Attendance: 0

28	Stal Stalowa Wola	0–2	Garbarnia Kraków	Stalowa Wola
				Stadium: Podkarpackie Centrum Piłki Nożnej; Attendance: 600

29	Stal Stalowa Wola	2–1	Lech Poznań II	Stalowa Wola
				Stadium: Podkarpackie Centrum Piłki Nożnej; Attendance: 500

30	Stal Stalowa Wola	3–0	Górnik Polkowice	Stalowa Wola
				Stadium: Podkarpackie Centrum Piłki Nożnej; Attendance: 550

31	Stal Stalowa Wola	5–1	Elana Toruń	Stalowa Wola
				Stadium: Podkarpackie Centrum Piłki Nożnej; Attendance: 757

32	Widzew Łódź	3–0	Stal Stalowa Wola	Łódź
				Stadium: Stadion Widzewa; Attendance: 4,502

33	Stal Stalowa Wola	2–0	GKS Katowice	Stalowa Wola
				Stadium: Podkarpackie Centrum Piłki Nożnej; Attendance: 875

34	Stal Stalowa Wola	0–3	Pogoń Siedlce	Stalowa Wola
				Stadium: Podkarpackie Centrum Piłki Nożnej; Attendance: 975

=== Polish Cup ===
25 September 2019 Round of 64	Chemik Police	0–4	Stal Stalowa Wola	Police
16:00 CEST (UTC+2)		90minut	Fidziukiewicz 10', 77'; Michalik 18'; Ciepiela 90'	Stadium: Stadion OSiR; Attendance: 217; Referee: Paweł Horożaniecki (Żary)

30 October 2019 Round of 32	Stal Stalowa Wola	1–1 (4–3 p)	GKS Katowice	Boguchwała
13:00 CET (UTC+1)	Kiercz 9'	90minut	M. Płonka 63' (o.g.)	Stadium: Izo Arena; Attendance: 75; Referee: Robert Marciniak (Kraków)

4 December 2019 Round of 16	Stal Stalowa Wola	0–2	Lech Poznań	Boguchwała
12:15 CET (UTC+1)		90minut	Puchacz 2'; Dejewski 69'	Stadium: Izo Arena; Attendance: 450; Referee: Sebastian Jarzębak (Bytom)

== Statistics ==
=== Top scorers ===
==== II liga ====
- 10 goals – (Poland) Michał Fidziukiewicz
- 8 goals – (Poland) Kacper Śpiewak
- 7 goals – (Poland) Robert Dadok
- 3 goals – (Poland) Bartłomiej Ciepiela
- 2 goals – (Poland) Szymon Jarosz, (Poland) Piotr Mroziński, (Poland) Michał Płonka, (Poland) Bartosz Sobotka
- 1 goal – (Poland) Dominik Chromiński, (Poland) Krzysztof Kiercz, (Poland) Michał Mistrzyk, (Poland) Przemysław Stelmach, (Poland) Adam Waszkiewicz, (Poland) Filip Wójcik, (Poland) Łukasz Zjawiński

==== Polish Cup ====
- 2 goals – (Poland) Michał Fidziukiewicz
- 1 goal – (Poland) Bartłomiej Ciepiela, (Poland) Krzysztof Kiercz, (Poland) Rafał Michalik
