= 2020–21 Stal Stalowa Wola season =

Stal Stalowa Wola
2020–21 season
- Chairman: Tomasz Solecki (until 17 August 2020); Michał Czubat (from 27 August 2020)
- Manager: Szymon Szydełko (until 31 October 2020); Jaromir Wieprzęć (4 November 2020 – 12 April 2021); Damian Skakuj (from 12 April 2021)
- Stadium: Podkarpackie Centrum Piłki Nożnej
- III liga, group IV: 4th
- Central Polish Cup: Round of 64
- Subcarpathian Stalowa Wola Polish Cup: Winners
- Stalowa Wola Polish Cup: Runners-up
- Top goalscorer: League: Michał Fidziukiewicz (18); All: Michał Fidziukiewicz (23)
- Highest home attendance: Polish Cup: 850 v Lechia (19 August 2020)
- Lowest home attendance: 0 (Note: Due to the COVID-19 pandemic restrictions, selected matches have been played behind closed doors without any spectators.)
- Biggest win: Polish Cup: Olimpia 1–8 Stal (26 August 2020)
- Biggest defeat: Polish Cup: Stal 0–4 Lechia (19 August 2020)
Home colours	Away colours
- All statistics correct as of 21 June 2021.

In the 2020–21 season, Stal Stalowa Wola competed in III liga, group IV and the regional Polish Cup. In addition, they competed in the season's edition of the central Polish Cup. The season covered the period from 9 August 2020 to 26 June 2021.

== Season overview ==
=== 2020 ===
This was the first season of Stal Stalowa Wola after their relegation from II liga. On 9 August 2020, Piotr Witasik was announced the team captain for the 2020–21 season.

The first match of the season, on 9 August, ended in a Polish Cup's 3–1 victory against Skra Częstochowa. Stal Stalowa Wola were knocked out of the 2020–21 Polish Cup exactly ten days later, after losing 0–4 against the Ekstraklasa club Lechia Gdańsk at the Podkarpackie Centrum Piłki Nożnej. On 23 August, Stal secured their first league win of the season by defeating Wólczanka Wólka Pełkińska 4–3 in a home game, with goals from Michał Fidziukiewicz twice, Adam Waszkiewicz and Szymon Jarosz.

The first Great Subcarpathian Derby against Siarka Tarnobrzeg on 26 September ended in a 4–1 away victory, with goals from Filip Szifer, Michał Fidziukiewicz twice and Volodymyr Khorolskyi. From 17 October, due to the COVID-19 pandemic restrictions, all Stal's football matches have been played behind closed doors without any spectators. On 31 October, after a 0–3 loss to Wisła Puławy, Szymon Szydełko was released from his contract (at the time of his release, Stal was sixth, 18 points behind to first place). On 4 November Jaromir Wieprzęć was announced as his successor. On 8 November he made his debut in a 0–1 defeat against Sokół Sieniawa. In December seven Stal Stalowa Wola players (Piotr Witasik, Szymon Jarosz, Rafał Surmiak, Piotr Zmorzyński, Michał Płonka, Michał Fidziukiewicz and Tomasz Płonka) were placed on a transfer list by the club.

=== 2021 ===
The new year started with a 1–0 home victory against Avia Świdnik, the only goal was scored by Tomasz Płonka. In the second game of the year, they suffered their first defeat against Podlasie Biała Podlaska 1–2. After two more unfortunate defeats, Stal's coach Jaromir Wieprzęć received an ultimatum, according to which he would resign if he had not won three consecutive matches in III liga. After winning one match against Jutrzenka Giebułtów, Stal lost to Korona Kielce II 0–1. Jaromir Wieprzęć was dismissed on 12 April, and in the next match against Hetman Zamość he was replaced by his assistant Damian Skakuj.

In the last league match of the season, Stal drew 2–2 with Podhale Nowy Targ, falling to the fourth place in the final classification of the season. On26 June 2021, Stal lost the final of the Subcarpathian Polish Cup to Wisłoka Dębica, losing the chance to participate in the 2021–22 Polish Cup's central edition.

== Players ==
As of 5 February 2021

Note: Flags indicate national team as defined under FIFA eligibility rules; some limited exceptions apply. Players may hold more than one non-FIFA nationality.

No.	Pos.	Nation	Player
1	GK	SVK	Adrián Knurovský ▲
2	DF	POL	Adam Waszkiewicz
4	MF	POL	Wiktor Stępniowski
5	MF	POL	Piotr Zmorzyński ▼
6	MF	POL	Maciej Wojtak ▲
7	MF	GUI	Aboubacar Condé ▲
7	MF	POL	Michał Płonka ▼
8	DF	POL	Michał Zięba ▲
9	FW	POL	Michał Fidziukiewicz ▼
10	MF	POL	Piotr Mroziński
11	MF	POL	Rafał Surmiak ▲
12	GK	POL	Matthew Korziewicz ▼
13	MF	POL	Przemysław Stelmach
14	MF	POL	Bartosz Wiktoruk ▲
15	MF	POL	Filip Szifer
16	DF	POL	Bartosz Sobotka
17	MF	SVK	Dávid Haščák ▲

No.	Pos.	Nation	Player
17	DF	POL	Kacper Śpiewak ▼
18	FW	POL	Tomasz Płonka
19	DF	POL	Szymon Jarosz ▼
19	DF	POL	Kacper Pietrzyk ▲
20	MF	POL	Szymon Jopek
21	DF	POL	Piotr Witasik ▼
22	DF	POL	Jakub Lebioda
22	FW	POL	Bartosz Tłuczek
24	DF	POL	Mateusz Hudzik
25	MF	POL	Kacper Piechniak ▲
26	FW	POL	Oliwier Pilch ▲
27	DF	UKR	Volodymyr Khorolskyi ▲
43	GK	POL	Tomasz Wietecha ▲
50	MF	POL	Aleksander Drobot ▲
99	GK	POL	Maciej Siudak
—	MF	FRA	Ilias El Bouh ▲
—	GK	POL	Łukasz Konefał ▲ ▼

°▲ symbol applies for players who joined the club during the season or in the pre-season term.
°▼ symbol applies for players who left the club during the season or in the summer transfer window term, but had made at least one regular-season appearance.

== Transfers ==
=== In ===
No.	Pos	Player	Moving from	Tier	Type	Fee	Transfer window	Source
11	MF	(Poland) Rafał Surmiak	Garbarnia Kraków	3rd	Contract expiry		Summer	
26	FW	(Poland) Oliwier Pilch	JKS Jarosław	5th	Loan	N/A	Summer	
6	MF	(Poland) Maciej Wojtak	Cracovia	1st	Transfer	N/A	Summer	
8	DF	(Poland) Michał Zięba	Cracovia	1st	Transfer	N/A	Summer	
27	DF	(Ukraine) Volodymyr Khorolskyi	Wólczanka Wólka Pełkińska	4th	Transfer	N/A	Summer	
–	GK	(Poland) Łukasz Konefał	GKS Katowice	3rd	End of loan		Summer	
14	MF	(Poland) Bartosz Wiktoruk	Pogoń Siedlce	3rd	Contract expiry		Summer	
–	DF	(Poland) Kacper Pietrzyk	Olimpia Grudziądz	3rd	Contract expiry		Winter	
–	MF	(Guinea) Aboubacar Condé	Miedź Legnica	2nd	Contract expiry		Winter	
–	MF	(Poland) Aleksander Drobot	Igloopol Dębica	5th	N/A	N/A	Winter	
17	MF	(Slovakia) Dávid Haščák	LZS Starowice Dolne	5th	N/A	N/A	Winter	
–	MF	(Poland) Kacper Piechniak	Alit Ożarów	5th	N/A	N/A	Winter	
43	GK	(Poland) Tomasz Wietecha	resumed his career	N/A	N/A	N/A	Winter	
1	GK	(Slovakia) Adrián Knurovský	(Slovakia) FK Poprad	2nd	N/A	N/A	Winter	
–	MF	(France) Ilias El Bouh	Unia Turza Śląska	5th	Transfer	N/A	Winter	

=== Out ===
No.	Pos	Player	Moving to	Tier	Type	Fee	Transfer window	Source(s)
26	MF	(Poland) Bartłomiej Ciepiela	Legia Warsaw II	4th	End of loan		Summer	
27	FW	(Poland) Adrian Szczutowski	Wisła Płock	1st	End of loan		Summer	
24	DF	(Poland) Krzysztof Kiercz	Broń Radom	4th	Contract expiry		Summer	
22	MF	(Poland) Rafał Michalik	KS Wiązownica	4th	Transfer	N/A	Summer	
11	MF	(Poland) Dominik Chromiński	Sokół Kleczew	4th	Contract expiry		Summer	
33	GK	(Poland) Dawid Pietrzkiewicz	Sandecja Nowy Sącz	2nd	Contract termination		Summer	
8	MF	(Poland) Dominik Ochał	Sokół Sieniawa	4th	Contract expiry		Summer	
17	FW	(Poland) Kacper Śpiewak	Bruk-Bet Termalica Nieciecza	2nd	Transfer	N/A	Summer	
5	MF	(Poland) Piotr Zmorzyński	Hutnik Kraków	3rd	Transfer	N/A	Winter	
9	FW	(Poland) Michał Fidziukiewicz	Garbarnia Kraków	3rd	Contract termination		Winter	
21	DF	(Poland) Piotr Witasik	Olimpia Grudziądz	3rd	Contract termination		Winter	
7	MF	(Poland) Michał Płonka	Polonia Bytom	4th	Contract termination		Winter	
19	DF	(Poland) Szymon Jarosz	Olimpia Grudziądz	3rd	Contract termination		Winter	
12	GK	(Poland) Matthew Korziewicz	KSZO Ostrowiec Świętokrzyski	4th	Contract termination		Winter	
–	GK	(Poland) Łukasz Konefał	Wólczanka Wólka Pełkińska	4th	Loan	N/A	Winter	

== Coaching staff ==
Club Management
President	(Poland) Tomasz Solecki (until 17 August 2020) (Poland) Michał Czubat (from 27 August 2020)
Manager	(Poland) Szymon Szydełko (until 31 October 2020) (Poland) Jaromir Wieprzęć (4 November 2020 – 12 April 2021) (Poland) Damian Skakuj (from 12 April 2021)
Assistant coach	(Poland) Konrad Bober (until 31 October 2020) (Poland) Damian Skakuj (4 November 2020 – 12 April 2021)
Goalkeeping coach	(Poland) Tomasz Wietecha
Team Manager	(Poland) Marek Drozd (until 24 September 2020) (Poland) Marcin Urban (from 26 September 2020)
Physiotherapist	(Poland) Tomasz Fijarczyk

== Friendlies ==
Win Draw Loss

20 January 2021 Friendly	Stal Stalowa Wola	Cancelled	Pogoń Staszów

23 January 2021 Friendly	Stal Stalowa Wola	0–1	Stal Kraśnik	Stalowa Wola
13:00 CET (UTC+1)		Stal1938	Dyszy 17' (pen.)	Stadium: Podkarpackie Centrum Piłki Nożnej; Attendance: 0

27 January 2021 Friendly	Stal Stalowa Wola	4–1	Wólczanka Wólka Pełkińska	Stalowa Wola
		Stal1938		Stadium: Podkarpackie Centrum Piłki Nożnej; Attendance: 0

30 January 2021 Friendly	Stal Stalowa Wola	2–1	Wisła Sandomierz	Stalowa Wola
		Stal1938		Stadium: Podkarpackie Centrum Piłki Nożnej; Attendance: 0

30 January 2021 Friendly	Stal Stalowa Wola	3–3	KS Wiązownica	Stalowa Wola
		Stal1938		Stadium: Podkarpackie Centrum Piłki Nożnej; Attendance: 0

3 February 2021 Friendly	Stal Stalowa Wola	2–1	Pniówek Pawłowice	Stalowa Wola
	2'; Mistrzyk 63'	Stal1938	25'	Stadium: Podkarpackie Centrum Piłki Nożnej; Attendance: 0

6 February 2021 Friendly	Górnik Łęczna	3–0	Stal Stalowa Wola	Lubartów
13:00 CET (UTC+1)	Śpiączka 36', 64'; Krykun 57'	Stal1938; 90minut		Stadium: Stadion MOSiR's side pitch Attendance: 0 Referee: Karol Iwanowicz (Lublin)

10 February 2021 Friendly	Stal Stalowa Wola	1–0	KSZO Ostrowiec Świętokrzyski	Stalowa Wola
		Stal1938		Stadium: Podkarpackie Centrum Piłki Nożnej; Attendance: 0

13 February 2021 Friendly	Stal Stalowa Wola	2–3	Sandecja Nowy Sącz	Nowa Wieś (Note: The primarily match was to take place in Rzeszów.)
	Mroziński 3'; Mistrzyk 75' (pen.)	90minut	Šovšić 8' (pen.); Chmiel 10'; Małkowski 68'	Stadium: Artificial pitch of the Gmina Trzebownisko; Attendance: 0 Referee: Mariusz Złotek (Stalowa Wola)

20 February 2021 Friendly	Stal Stalowa Wola	1–2	Motor Lublin	Stalowa Wola
11:00 CET (UTC+1)	Mroziński 54'	90minut	Moskwik 12'; Świderski 82'	Stadium: Podkarpackie Centrum Piłki Nożnej's side pitch Attendance: 0

27 February 2021 Friendly	Hutnik Kraków	1–1	Stal Stalowa Wola	Kraków
13:00 CET (UTC+1)	Sobala 64'	90minut	Wojtak 81'	Stadium: Stadion Suche Stawy's side pitch Attendance: 0

== Competitions ==
Win Draw Loss

=== Overview ===
Competition	First match	Last match	Starting round	Final position	Record							
Competition	First match	Last match	Starting round	Final position	Pld	W	D	L	GF	GA	GD	Win %
III liga, group IV	15 August 2020	20 June 2021	Matchday 1	4th	40	22	7	11	77	44	+33	55.00
Central Polish Cup	9 August 2020	19 August 2020	Preliminary round	Round of 64	2	1	0	1	3	5	−2	50.00
Subcarpathian Stalowa Wola Polish Cup	26 August 2020	5 May 2021	Second round	Winners	4	3	1	0	12	1	+11	75.00
Subcarpathian Polish Cup	26 May 2021	26 June 2021	Semi-finals	Runners-up	2	1	1	0	2	1	+1	50.00
Total					48	27	9	12	94	51	+43	56.25

Last updated: 26 June 2021
Source: Competitions

=== III liga, group IV ===
==== Standings ====
Pos	Team	Pld	W	D	L	GF	GA	GD	Pts
2	Chełmianka Chełm	40	22	7	11	70	45	+25	73
3	Sokół Sieniawa	40	21	10	9	61	37	+24	73
4	Stal Stalowa Wola	40	22	7	11	77	44	+33	73
5	Avia Świdnik	40	20	10	10	88	40	+48	70
6	Wisłoka Dębica	40	20	10	10	75	45	+30	70

Updated to match(es) played on unknown. Source: 90minut.pl
Rules for classification: 1. Number of points reached in the entire series of games; 2. Number of points reached in direct matches; 3. Goal difference in direct matches; 4. Goal difference in direct matches – away goals counted twice; 5. Goal difference in the whole series of games; 6. Number of goals scored in the entire series of games.

==== Results summary ====
Overall								Home						Away					
Pld	W	D	L	GF	GA	GD	Pts	W	D	L	GF	GA	GD	W	D	L	GF	GA	GD
40	22	7	11	77	44	+33	73	11	5	4	35	20	+15	11	2	7	42	24	+18

Last updated: 26 June 2021.
Source: 90minut.pl

==== Matches ====
1	Pause (Note: Due to an odd number of teams in the league.)

15 August 2020 (Note: The primarily match was to take place on August 8–9, 2020. It was postponed due to the match of Stal Stalowa Wola in the Polish Cup.) 2	Avia Świdnik	3–1	Stal Stalowa Wola	Świdnik
13:00 CEST (UTC+2)	Kursa 24'; Maluga 66'; Białek 70'	90minut	Fidziukiewicz 11'	Stadium: Stadion Miejski; Attendance: 400; Referee: Piotr Kawiński (Chełm)

23 September 2020 (Note: The primarily match was to take place on August 12, 2020 and then on September 16, 2020. It was postponed twice.) 3	Stal Stalowa Wola	3–2	Podlasie Biała Podlaska	Stalowa Wola
19:38 CEST (UTC+2)	Waszkiewicz 20'; Fidziukiewicz 40', 90'	90minut	Chmielewski 26'; Skrodziuk 87'	Stadium: Podkarpackie Centrum Piłki Nożnej; Referee: Albert Bińkowski (Skarżysko-Kamienna)

30 September 2020 (Note: The primarily match was to take place on August 15–16, 2020. It was postponed due to matches of KSZO Ostrowiec Świętokrzyski and Stal Stalowa Wola in the Polish Cup.) 4	KSZO Ostrowiec Świętokrzyski	1–2	Stal Stalowa Wola	Ostrowiec Świętokrzyski
17:00 CEST (UTC+2)	Trochim 33'	90minut	Mroziński 36', 66'	Stadium: Miejski Stadion Sportowy; Referee: Adam Jamka (Kielce)

23 August 2020 5	Stal Stalowa Wola	4–3	Wólczanka Wólka Pełkińska	Stalowa Wola
17:00 CEST (UTC+2)	Fidziukiewicz 7', 88'; Waszkiewicz 61'; Jarosz 78'	90minut	Pietluch 34', 84'; Bała 67'	Stadium: Podkarpackie Centrum Piłki Nożnej; Attendance: 500; Referee: Jakub Moskal (Kielce)

14 October 2020 (Note: The primarily match was to take place on August 26, 2020 at 16:30 CEST (UTC+2). It was postponed due to epidemic threat.) 6	Jutrzenka Giebułtów	3–2	Stal Stalowa Wola	Kraków (Note: The primarily match was to take place at Stadion Miejski in Zabierzów.)
14:00 CEST (UTC+2)	K. Kozieł 61'; Pietrzyk 71'; B. Kozieł 85'	90minut	Waszkiewicz 32'; Fidziukiewicz 56' (pen.)	Stadium: Stadion Miejski im. Władysława Kawuli; Referee: Patryk Świerczek (Brzesko)

30 August 2020 7	Stal Stalowa Wola	2–0	Korona Kielce II	Stalowa Wola
17:00 CEST (UTC+2)	Zięba 2'; Prętnik 16' (o.g.)	90minut		Stadium: Podkarpackie Centrum Piłki Nożnej; Attendance: 557; Referee: Michał Bobrek (Wadowice)

6 September 2020 8	Hetman Zamość	1–1	Stal Stalowa Wola	Zamość
16:00 CEST (UTC+2)	Kruczkowski 26' (pen.); (yellow card) (yellow-red card) 72' Pupeć; (yellow card) (yellow-red card) 90' Myszka	90minut	(yellow card) (yellow-red card) 24' Khorolskyi; Fidziukiewicz 85'	Stadium: Stadion OSiR; Attendance: 500; Referee: Łukasz Królczyk (Nowy Targ)

9 September 2020 9	Stal Stalowa Wola	0–1	Chełmianka Chełm	Stalowa Wola
19:38 CEST (UTC+2)		90minut	Prytulak 72'	Stadium: Podkarpackie Centrum Piłki Nożnej; Referee: Paweł Bagan (Kraków)

12 September 2020 10	Wisłoka Dębica	0–2	Stal Stalowa Wola	Dębica
16:30 CEST (UTC+2)		90minut	Witasik 85'; Fidziukiewicz 90' (pen.)	Stadium: Stadion Miejski; Attendance: 1,100; Referee: Jakub Moskal (Kielce)

19 September 2020 11	Stal Stalowa Wola	0–0	Lewart Lubartów	Stalowa Wola
19:38 CEST (UTC+2)		90minut		Stadium: Podkarpackie Centrum Piłki Nożnej; Referee: Mateusz Czerwień (Kraków)

26 September 2020 12	Siarka Tarnobrzeg	1–4	Stal Stalowa Wola	Tarnobrzeg
16:00 CEST (UTC+2)	Bałdyga 57'	90minut	Szifer 21'; Fidziukiewicz 35' (pen.), 41' (pen.); Khorolskyi 47'	Stadium: Stadion OSiR; Attendance: 1,200; Referee: Piotr Burak (Zamość)

3 October 2020 13	Stal Stalowa Wola	0–1	Wisła Sandomierz	Stalowa Wola
18:00 CEST (UTC+2)		90minut	Bełczowski 25'	Stadium: Podkarpackie Centrum Piłki Nożnej; Referee: Jakub Pieron (Kielce)

10 October 2020 (Note: The primarily match was to take place on October 11, 2020 at 14:00 CEST (UTC+2).) 14	KS Wiązownica	0–6	Stal Stalowa Wola	Wiązownica
15:00 CEST (UTC+2)		90minut	Mroziński 15', 16', 60', 63'; Fidziukiewicz 20', 37'	Stadium: Stadion Gminny; Referee: Sebastian Godek (Rzeszów)

17 October 2020 15	Stal Stalowa Wola	2–0	Stal Kraśnik	Stalowa Wola
14:30 CEST (UTC+2)	Fidziukiewicz 6', 20'	90minut		Stadium: Podkarpackie Centrum Piłki Nożnej; Attendance: 0 Referee: Paweł Sitkowski (Biała Podlaska)

29 November 2020 (Note: The primarily match was to take place on October 25, 2020 at 14:00 CET (UTC+1). It was postponed due to the coronavirus case detected in the ŁKS Łagów team.) 16	ŁKS Łagów	1–4	Stal Stalowa Wola	Łagów
12:30 CET (UTC+1)	Imiela 63' (pen.)	Stal1938	Mroziński 14'; Wiktoruk 23', 45'; Fidziukiewicz 66'	Stadium: Stadion Gminny; Attendance: 0 Referee: Arkadiusz Nestorowicz (Biała Podlaska)

31 October 2020 17	Stal Stalowa Wola	0–3	Wisła Puławy	Stalowa Wola
13:00 CET (UTC+1)		90minut	Witasik 8' (og.); Paluchowski 15', 81'	Stadium: Podkarpackie Centrum Piłki Nożnej; Attendance: 0 Referee: Krzysztof Pachołek (Lubaczów)

8 November 2020 18	Sokół Sieniawa	1–0	Stal Stalowa Wola	Sieniawa
13:00 CET (UTC+1)	Lis 10'; (red card) 77' Grasza	Stal1938		Stadium: Stadion Miejski; Attendance: 0 Referee: Patryk Świerczek (Brzesko)

11 November 2020 19	Stal Stalowa Wola	2–1	Orlęta Radzyń Podlaski	Stalowa Wola
14:00 CET (UTC+1)	Fidziukiewicz 48'; Mistrzyk 64'	Stal1938	Nowosadko 43'	Stadium: Podkarpackie Centrum Piłki Nożnej; Attendance: 0 Referee: Paweł Bagan (Kraków)

14 November 2020 20	Cracovia II	0–3	Stal Stalowa Wola	Kraków
16:00 CET (UTC+1)		Stal1938	Fidziukiewicz 9', 29'; Wiktoruk 79'	Stadium: Stadion Miejski im. Władysława Kawuli; Attendance: 0 Referee: Adam Jamka (Kielce)

21 November 2020 21	Stal Stalowa Wola	2–1	Podhale Nowy Targ	Stalowa Wola
13:00 CET (UTC+1)	Wiktoruk 8'; Mistrzyk 66'	Stal1938	Potoniec 12'	Stadium: Podkarpackie Centrum Piłki Nożnej; Attendance: 0 Referee: Piotr Burak (Zamość)

22	Pause

6 March 2021 23	Stal Stalowa Wola	1–0	Avia Świdnik	Stalowa Wola
13:00 CET (UTC+1)	T. Płonka 78'	90minut		Stadium: Podkarpackie Centrum Piłki Nożnej's side pitch Attendance: 0 Referee: Adam Jamka (Kielce)

13 March 2021 24	Podlasie Biała Podlaska	2–1	Stal Stalowa Wola	Biała Podlaska
14:00 CET (UTC+1)	Chmielewski 12'; Kosieradzki 56'	90minut	Piechniak 50'	Stadium: Stadion Miejski's side pitch Attendance: 0 Referee: Daniel Detka (Kielce)

20 March 2021 25	Stal Stalowa Wola	1–2	KSZO Ostrowiec Świętokrzyski	Stalowa Wola
14:00 CET (UTC+1)	Mistrzyk 37'	90minut	Stanisławski 11', 82'	Stadium: Podkarpackie Centrum Piłki Nożnej; Attendance: 0 Referee: Michał Mikulski (Lublin)

27 March 2021 26	Wólczanka Wólka Pełkińska	2–0	Stal Stalowa Wola	Wólka Pełkińska
15:00 CET (UTC+1)	Podstolak 60' (pen.); Galara 80'	90minut		Stadium: Stadion Gminny; Attendance: 0 Referee: Arkadiusz Nestorowicz (Biała Podlaska)

3 April 2021 27	Stal Stalowa Wola	2–0	Jutrzenka Giebułtów	Stalowa Wola
12:00 CEST (UTC+2)	Mistrzyk 78', 80'	90minut		Stadium: Podkarpackie Centrum Piłki Nożnej; Attendance: 0 Referee: Michał Wasil (Lublin)

11 April 2021 28	Korona Kielce II	1–0	Stal Stalowa Wola	Kielce
12:00 CEST (UTC+2)	Dziubek 54'	90minut		Stadium: Stadion MOSiR; Attendance: 0 Referee: Tomasz Musiał (Kraków)

13 April 2021 29	Stal Stalowa Wola	5–0	Hetman Zamość	Stalowa Wola
17:00 CEST (UTC+2)	Khorolskyi 38'; Mistrzyk 45' (pen.); Mroziński 60', 83'; T. Płonka 81'	90minut		Stadium: Podkarpackie Centrum Piłki Nożnej; Attendance: 0 Referee: Anna Adamska (Kielce)

18 April 2021 30	Chełmianka Chełm	0–1	Stal Stalowa Wola	Chełm
15:00 CEST (UTC+2)		90minut	Mroziński 18'	Stadium: Stadion Miejski; Attendance: 0 Referee: Paweł Bagan (Kraków)

24 April 2021 31	Stal Stalowa Wola	0–0	Wisłoka Dębica	Stalowa Wola
17:00 CEST (UTC+2)		90minut		Stadium: Podkarpackie Centrum Piłki Nożnej; Attendance: 0 Referee: Jan Pawlikowski (Nowy Targ)

28 April 2021 32	Lewart Lubartów	1–2	Stal Stalowa Wola	Lubartów
17:00 CEST (UTC+2)		90minut		Stadium: Stadion MOSiR; Attendance: 0 Referee: Jakub Moskal (Kielce)

1 May 2021 33	Stal Stalowa Wola	4–0	Siarka Tarnobrzeg	Stalowa Wola
17:00 CEST (UTC+2)	Mroziński 46', 79'; Mistrzyk 64' (pen.); Wojtak 90'	90minut		Stadium: Podkarpackie Centrum Piłki Nożnej; Attendance: 0 Referee: Mateusz Czerwień (Kraków)

9 May 2021 34	Wisła Sandomierz	0–3	Stal Stalowa Wola	Sandomierz
16:00 CEST (UTC+2)		90minut Stal1938	Wiktoruk 47'; Mroziński 50'; Waszkiewicz 52' (pen.)	Stadium: Stadion Miejski; Attendance: 0 Referee: Łukasz Szczołko (Lublin)

15 May 2021 35	Stal Stalowa Wola	2–2	KS Wiązownica	Stalowa Wola
17:00 CEST (UTC+2)		90minut		Stadium: Podkarpackie Centrum Piłki Nożnej; Referee: Patryk Świerczek (Brzesko)

19 May 2021 36	Stal Kraśnik	0–2	Stal Stalowa Wola	Kraśnik
17:00 CEST (UTC+2)		90minut	Grabarz 39'; Mistrzyk 56'	Stadium: Stadion MOSiR; Referee: Grzegorz Jabłoński (Kraków)

22 May 2021 37	Stal Stalowa Wola	3–2	ŁKS Łagów	Stalowa Wola
17:00 CEST (UTC+2)		90minut		Stadium: Podkarpackie Centrum Piłki Nożnej; Referee: Piotr Kawiński (Chełm)

30 May 2021 38	Wisła Puławy	1–3	Stal Stalowa Wola	Puławy
18:00 CEST (UTC+2)		90minut		Stadium: Stadion MOSiR; Referee: Jakub Moskal (Kielce)

2 June 2021 39	Stal Stalowa Wola	0–0	Sokół Sieniawa	Stalowa Wola
18:00 CEST (UTC+2)				Stadium: Podkarpackie Centrum Piłki Nożnej

6 June 2021 40	Orlęta Radzyń Podlaski	4–3	Stal Stalowa Wola	Radzyń Podlaski
18:00 CEST (UTC+2)		90minut		Stadium: Stadion Miejski; Referee: Arkadiusz Nestorowicz (Biała Podlaska)

12 June 2021 41	Stal Stalowa Wola	2–2	Cracovia II	Stalowa Wola
17:30 CEST (UTC+2)		90minut		Stadium: Podkarpackie Centrum Piłki Nożnej; Referee: Piotr Kawiński (Chełm)

20 June 2021 42	Podhale Nowy Targ	2–2	Stal Stalowa Wola	Nowy Targ
17:30 CEST (UTC+2)	Serafin 22'; Dynarek 82'	90minut	Haščák 79'; Mistrzyk 89' (pen.)	Stadium: Stadion Miejski; Attendance: 200; Referee: Daniel Detka (Kielce)

=== Polish Cup ===
==== Central level ====
9 August 2020 Preliminary round	Skra Częstochowa	1–3	Stal Stalowa Wola	Częstochowa
16:30 CEST (UTC+2)	Gołębiowski 57'	90minut	Mroziński 6' (pen.); Śpiewak 45+2'; Fidziukiewicz 86'	Stadium: Stolzle Stadion STO; Attendance: 120; Referee: Mateusz Złotnicki (Lublin)

19 August 2020 Round of 64	Stal Stalowa Wola	0–4	Lechia Gdańsk	Stalowa Wola
16:30 CEST (UTC+2)		90minut	Fila 18'; Zwoliński 23'; Gajos 52'; Kałuziński 68'	Stadium: Podkarpackie Centrum Piłki Nożnej; Attendance: 850; Referee: Albert Różycki (Łódź)

==== Regional level (group: Subcarpathian Football Association – Stalowa Wola) ====
26 August 2020 (Note: The primarily match was to take place on August 19, 2020. It was postponed due to the match of Stal Stalowa Wola at the central level of the Polish Cup.) Second round	Olimpia Pysznica	1–8	Stal Stalowa Wola	Pysznica
17:00 CEST (UTC+2)	Tofil 34'	90minut	Fidziukiewicz 14', 26', 28', 30'; Mroziński 18' (pen.); Ziółkowski 61'; Witasik 71'; Pilch 79'	Stadium: Stadium in Pysznica; Referee: Mariusz Myszka (Stalowa Wola)

2 September 2020 Third round	Dolina-Tanew Wólka Tanewska	0–2	Stal Stalowa Wola	Wólka Tanewska
16:00 CEST (UTC+2)		90minut	Mistrzyk 54'; Ziółkowski 71'	Stadium: Stadium in Wólka Tanewska; Referee: Tomasz Giżka (Stalowa Wola)

7 October 2020 (Note: The primarily match was to take place on September 30, 2020 at 16:00 CEST (UTC+2). It was postponed.) Semi-finals	Sparta Jeżowe	0–2	Stal Stalowa Wola	Jeżowe
16:00 CEST (UTC+2)		90minut	Ziółkowski 36'; Mistrzyk 65'	Stadium: Stadium in Jeżowe

5 May 2021 (Note: The primarily match was to take place on 28 April 2021. It was postponed.) Final	Stal Stalowa Wola	0–0 (a.e.t.) (6–5 p)	Siarka Tarnobrzeg	Stalowa Wola
		90minut Stal1938	Sulkowski (penalty missed)	Stadium: Podkarpackie Centrum Piłki Nożnej; Attendance: 0 Referee: Sebastian Godek (Rzeszów)
	Penalties
	Mistrzyk (penalty scored); Wiktoruk (penalty missed); Waszkiewicz (penalty scored); Sobotka (penalty scored); Mroziński (penalty missed); Jopek (penalty scored); Khorolskyi (penalty scored); Zięba (penalty scored)		(penalty missed) Bałdyga; (penalty scored) Sulkowski; (penalty missed) Gajewski; (penalty scored) Rogala; (penalty scored) Tabor; (penalty scored) Duda; (penalty scored) Skrzypek; (penalty missed) Zmarzlik

==== Regional level (group: Subcarpathian Football Association) ====
26 May 2021 Semi-finals	Karpaty Krosno	0–2	Stal Stalowa Wola	Krosno
20:00 CEST (UTC+2)		90minut Stal1938	Wiktoruk 16'; Mroziński 90'	Stadium: Stadion Miejski; Referee: Sebastian Godek (Rzeszów)

26 June 2021 Final	Stal Stalowa Wola	0–1 (a.e.t.)	Wisłoka Dębica	Stalowa Wola
17:00 CEST (UTC+2)		90minut	Palonek 119'	Stadium: Podkarpackie Centrum Piłki Nożnej

== Statistics ==
=== Goalscorers ===
==== III liga ====
As of 21 March 2021

Rank	Player	Goals in 2020	Goals in 2021	Goals in total
1	(Poland) Michał Fidziukiewicz ‡	18	—N/a	18
2	(Poland) Piotr Mroziński	6	0	6
3	(Poland) Bartosz Wiktoruk	4	0	4
4	(Poland) Adam Waszkiewicz	3	0	3
4	(Poland) Michał Mistrzyk	2	1	3
6	(Poland) Szymon Jarosz ‡	1	—N/a	1
6	(Ukraine) Volodymyr Khorolskyi	1	0	1
6	(Poland) Kacper Piechniak	—N/a	1	1
6	(Poland) Tomasz Płonka	1	0	1
6	(Poland) Filip Szifer	1	0	1
6	(Poland) Piotr Witasik ‡	1	—N/a	1
6	(Poland) Michał Zięba	1	0	1

- ^{‡} Player left the club mid-season

==== Polish Cup ====
As of 26 June 2021

Rank	Player	Central level	Regional level	Goals in total
1	(Poland) Michał Fidziukiewicz	1	4	5
2	(Poland) Kacper Ziółkowski	0	3	3
2	(Poland) Piotr Mroziński	1	2	3
4	(Poland) Michał Mistrzyk	0	2	2
5	(Poland) Oliwier Pilch	0	1	1
5	(Poland) Kacper Śpiewak	1	0	1
5	(Poland) Piotr Witasik	0	1	1
5	(Poland) Bartosz Wiktoruk	0	1	1

=== Hat-tricks ===
Player	Against	Result	Date	Competition
(Poland) Michał Fidziukiewicz^{4}	Olimpia Pysznica	8–1 (A)	26 August 2020	Polish Cup
(Poland) Piotr Mroziński^{4}	KS Wiązownica	6–0 (A)	10 October 2020	III liga

(H) – Home; (A) – Away

== Other teams ==
=== Reserve team ===
Stal Stalowa Wola II competed in the IV liga Subcarpathia. In the end, Stal II got relegated to the regional league.

==== Overview ====
Competition	First match	Last match	Starting round	Final position	Record							
Competition	First match	Last match	Starting round	Final position	Pld	W	D	L	GF	GA	GD	Win %
IV liga Subcarpathia	26 July 2020	18 June 2021	Matchday 1	18th	34	9	6	19	48	87	−39	26.47
Total					34	9	6	19	48	87	−39	26.47

Last updated: 26 June 2021
Source: Competitions

=== Juniors U-15 ===
Stal Stalowa Wola U-15 competed in the Subcarpathian group, as they won the competition after a 12–1 victory over Karpaty Krosno. In the U-15 Central Junior League play-off, they drew 5–5 (2–2 away, 3–3 a.e.t. home) in aggregate to Unia Tarnów (Lesser Poland group winners) and eventually dropped out of the competition due to the away goals rule.

==== Overview ====
Competition	First match	Last match	Starting round	Final position	Record							
Competition	First match	Last match	Starting round	Final position	Pld	W	D	L	GF	GA	GD	Win %
U-15 Subcarpathian CLJ	9 August 2020	24 October 2020	Matchday 1	Winners	14	13	0	1	72	12	+60	92.86
Total					14	13	0	1	72	12	+60	92.86

Last updated: 24 October 2020
Source: Competitions

==== U-15 Central Junior League play-off matches ====
11 November 2020 U-15 CLJ play-off first leg	Unia Tarnów U-15	2–2	Stal Stalowa Wola U-15	Tarnów
11:00 CET (UTC+1)	Goal	Stal1938	Pchełka; Bąk	Attendance: 0
Note: Match played 2x40 minutes.

15 November 2020 U-15 CLJ play-off second leg	Stal Stalowa Wola U-15	3–3 (a.e.t.) (5–5 agg.)	Unia Tarnów U-15	Stalowa Wola
11:00 CET (UTC+1)	Pioterczak 15', 18'; Bąk 86'	Stal1938	Zbierzkowski 54', 58'; Jasiak 94'	Stadium: Podkarpackie Centrum Piłki Nożnej; Attendance: 0
Note: Match played 2x40 minutes, extra time played 2x15 minutes.
