= Wietecha =

Wietecha may refer to:

- Ray Wietecha (1928–2002), American footballer
- Tomasz Wietecha (born 1978), Polish footballer
