= Tomasz Wróbel =

Polish footballer

Personal information
- Full name: Tomasz Wróbel
- Date of birth: 10 July 1982 (age 44)
- Place of birth: Tarnów, Poland
- Height: 1.68 m (5 ft 6 in)
- Position: Winger

Youth career
- Rozwój Katowice

Senior career*
Years	Team	Apps	(Gls)
1999–2005	Rozwój Katowice		
2005	Górnik Polkowice	17	(4)
2005–2013	GKS Bełchatów	184	(18)
2013–2014	GKS Katowice	29	(6)
2014–2016	Rozwój Katowice	95	(21)
2016–2017	Raków Częstochowa	19	(1)
2018–2019	Rozwój Katowice	17	(4)
2020–2021	Rozwój Katowice	16	(1)

Managerial career
- 2019–2020: Rozwój Katowice (U19)
- 2020–2023: Rozwój Katowice
- 2025–2026: Sparta Katowice
- * Club domestic league appearances and goals

Tomasz Wróbel (born 10 July 1982) is a Polish professional football manager and former player who was most recently in charge of III liga club Sparta Katowice.

== Career ==
He is a trainee of Rozwój Katowice. Before moving to GKS Bełchatów, he played for Górnik Polkowice.

== Managerial statistics ==
As of match played 27 May 2026

Managerial record by team and tenure
Team	From	To	Record							
Team	From	To	G	W	D	L	GF	GA	GD	Win %
Rozwój Katowice	7 July 2020	30 June 2023	96	51	14	31	203	111	+92	53.13
Sparta Katowice	30 March 2025	27 May 2026	53	34	9	10	116	51	+65	64.15
Total			149	85	23	41	319	162	+157	57.05

== Honours ==
=== Player ===
Raków Częstochowa

- II liga: 2016–17

=== Managerial ===
Sparta Katowice

- IV liga Silesia: 2024–25
- Polish Cup (Katowice regionals): 2025–26
