= Kacper Śpiewak =

Polish footballer

Personal information
- Full name: Kacper Śpiewak
- Date of birth: 30 May 2000 (age 26)
- Place of birth: Stalowa Wola, Poland
- Height: 1.85 m (6 ft 1 in)
- Position: Forward

Team information
- Current team: Sokół Kleczew
- Number: 10

Youth career
- San Wrzawy
- Tłoki Gorzyce
- 2012–2013: Stal Stalowa Wola
- 2014: Resovia
- 2014–2017: Stal Stalowa Wola

Senior career*
| Years | Team | Apps | (Gls) |
| 2017–2020 | Stal Stalowa Wola | 32 | (8) |
| 2020–2023 | Bruk-Bet Termalica | 83 | (9) |
| 2023–2025 | Motor Lublin | 21 | (2) |
| 2025 | Polonia Warsaw | 15 | (0) |
| 2026 | Stal Stalowa Wola | 13 | (1) |
| 2026– | Sokół Kleczew | 0 | (0) |

International career
| 2021 | Poland U21 | 2 | (2) |
- * Club domestic league appearances and goals as of 11:20, 31 May 2026 (UTC)

Kacper Śpiewak (born 30 May 2000) is a Polish professional footballer who plays as a forward for II liga club Sokół Kleczew.

Śpiewak began his senior club career playing for Stal Stalowa Wola, before signing with Bruk-Bet Termalica in 2020, winning promotion to the Ekstraklasa in his first season. In 2023, he moved to Motor Lublin, where he repeated the same feat. In January 2025, he joined Polonia Warsaw, before returning to Stal twelve months later. In mid-2026, he moved to Sokół Kleczew.

== Club career ==
=== Stal Stalowa Wola ===
Śpiewak started his career with Stal Stalowa Wola.

On 30 July 2017, he made his professional debut for Stal, in a 1–1 II liga draw to Gryf Wejherowo. In his third season at Stal, he scored his premier goal, as his team drew 2–2 to Olimpia Elbląg. At the end of that campaign, Stal was relegated to III liga. In the 2020–21 season, he played two games, scoring one goal in a Polish Cup fixture against Skra Częstochowa.

=== Bruk-Bet Termalica Nieciecza ===
On 19 August 2020, Stal Stalowa Wola announced that I liga side Bruk-Bet Termalica Nieciecza activated Śpiewak's buyout clause. On 23 August 2020, he made his debut and scored a goal for Bruk-Bet in a 4–0 Polish Cup victory over Bytovia Bytów. On 23 August 2021, he made his debut in Ekstraklasa, entering the pitch in the 85th minute in a 1–1 draw against Stal Mielec.

=== Motor Lublin ===
On 21 June 2023, Śpiewak signed a two-year contract with an extension option with I liga club Motor Lublin. On 7 January 2025, after making no appearances in the first half of the 2024–25 season, he terminated his contract by mutual consent.

=== Polonia Warsaw ===
On 8 January 2025, he moved to I liga side Polonia Warsaw on a one-year deal with an option to extend. He left Polonia at the end of 2025.

=== Return to Stal Stalowa Wola ===
On 5 February 2026, Śpiewak rejoined Stal Stalowa Wola on a five-month deal, with a one-year option. In July 2026, Stal confirmed that Śpiewak had left the club at the end of the season.

=== Sokół Kleczew ===
On 15 July 2026, Śpiewak joined another third-tier club Sokół Kleczew.

== International career ==
Śpiewak began his international career with Poland U21 in 2021. He made his first junior appearance in a 4–0 2023 UEFA European Under-21 Championship qualification's win over Germany U21 on 12 November 2021, coming on as a substitute for Adrian Benedyczak. On 16 November 2021, he scored two goals for Poland, in a 5–0 qualifying victory over Latvia U21.

== Career statistics ==
As of match played 15 May 2026

Appearances and goals by club, season and competition
| Club | Season | League | | | Polish Cup | | Other | | Total | |
| Club | Season | Division | Apps | Goals | Apps | Goals | Apps | Goals | Apps | Goals |
|---|---|---|---|---|---|---|---|---|---|---|
| Stal Stalowa Wola | 2017–18 | II liga | 4 | 0 | 0 | 0 | — | | 4 | 0 |
| Stal Stalowa Wola | 2018–19 | II liga | 4 | 0 | 1 | 0 | — | | 5 | 0 |
| Stal Stalowa Wola | 2019–20 | II liga | 23 | 8 | 2 | 0 | — | | 25 | 8 |
| Stal Stalowa Wola | 2020–21 | III liga, gr. IV | 1 | 0 | 1 | 1 | — | | 2 | 1 |
| Stal Stalowa Wola | Total | | 32 | 8 | 4 | 1 | — | | 36 | 9 |
| Bruk-Bet Termalica | 2020–21 | I liga | 30 | 6 | 2 | 1 | — | | 32 | 7 |
| Bruk-Bet Termalica | 2021–22 | Ekstraklasa | 28 | 2 | 2 | 0 | — | | 30 | 2 |
| Bruk-Bet Termalica | 2022–23 | I liga | 24 | 1 | 1 | 0 | 1 (Note: Appearance in I liga promotion play-offs) | 0 | 26 | 1 |
| Bruk-Bet Termalica | Total | | 82 | 9 | 5 | 1 | 1 | 0 | 88 | 10 |
| Motor Lublin | 2023–24 | I liga | 21 | 2 | 1 | 0 | 0 | 0 | 22 | 2 |
| Motor Lublin | 2024–25 | Ekstraklasa | 0 | 0 | 0 | 0 | — | | 0 | 0 |
| Motor Lublin | Total | | 21 | 2 | 1 | 0 | 0 | 0 | 22 | 2 |
| Polonia Warsaw | 2024–25 | I liga | 10 | 0 | 1 | 0 | 1 | 0 | 12 | 0 |
| Polonia Warsaw | 2025–26 | I liga | 4 | 0 | 0 | 0 | — | | 4 | 0 |
| Polonia Warsaw | Total | | 14 | 0 | 1 | 0 | 1 | 0 | 16 | 0 |
| Stal Stalowa Wola | 2025–26 | II liga | 13 | 1 | — | | — | | 13 | 1 |
| Sokół Kleczew | 2026–27 | II liga | 0 | 0 | 0 | 0 | — | | 0 | 0 |
| Career total | | | 162 | 20 | 11 | 2 | 2 | 0 | 175 | 22 |
