= Jaromir Wieprzęć =

Polish manager

Personal information
- Full name: Jaromir Wieprzęć
- Date of birth: 13 March 1974 (age 52)
- Place of birth: Stalowa Wola, Poland
- Height: 1.89 m (6 ft 2 1/2 in)
- Position: Defender

Senior career*
Years	Team	Apps	(Gls)
1991–1996	Stal Stalowa Wola		
1996–1998	Raków Częstochowa	45	(1)
1998–2003	Stal Stalowa Wola	27	(0)
2003	KSZO Ostrowiec Świętokrzyski	16	(0)
2004	Stasiak Opoczno	15	(2)
2004–2005	KSZO Ostrowiec Świętokrzyski	26	(1)
2005–2012	Stal Stalowa Wola	135	(15)

Managerial career
- 2014–2016: Stal Stalowa Wola
- 2020–2021: Stal Stalowa Wola
- * Club domestic league appearances and goals

Jaromir Wieprzęć (born 13 March 1974) is a Polish professional football manager and former player who played as a defender.

== Football career ==
He is well-known from playing in Ekstraklasa for Stal Stalowa Wola and Raków Częstochowa. After finishing the football career, he joined professionally Stal Stalowa Wola as a coach. His first attempt happened in 2014–2016. On 4 November 2020, he was announced as Stal Stalowa Wola coach, following the sacking of Szymon Szydełko. On 8 November 2020, he made his debut in a 0–1 defeat against Sokół Sieniawa. He was dismissed on 12 April 2021, after suffering a 0–1 defeat against Korona Kielce II the day before.

== Personal life ==
He is a father of a footballer Maciej Wieprzęć (born 8 April 2000 in Nisko), who is a Stal Stalowa Wola home-grown.

== Managerial statistics ==
As of 12 April 2021

Managerial record by team and tenure
Team	Division	From	To	Record							
Team	Division	From	To	G	W	D	L	GF	GA	GD	Win %
(Poland) Stal Stalowa Wola	II liga	23 June 2014	4 January 2016	61	28	16	17	97	71	+26	45.90
(Poland) Stal Stalowa Wola	III liga	4 November 2020	12 April 2021	11	6	0	5	16	11	+5	54.55
Total				72	34	16	22	113	82	+31	47.22

== See also ==
- 2020–21 Stal Stalowa Wola season
