= 2024–25 Motor Lublin season =

Motor Lublin
2024–25 season
- Manager: Mateusz Stolarski
- Stadium: Arena Lublin
- Ekstraklasa: 7th
- Polish Cup: First round
- Top goalscorer: League: Piotr Ceglarz (2); All: Piotr Ceglarz (2)
- Highest home attendance: 14,158 vs Raków Częstochowa
- Average home league attendance: 13,430
- Biggest defeat: Motor Lublin 0–2 Raków Częstochowa
Home colours	Away colours	Third colours

The 2024–25 season is the 74th season in the history of Motor Lublin. Motor Lublin will return to the top division of Polish football for the first time in 32 years. In addition to the domestic league, the team is scheduled to participate in the Polish Cup.

== Transfers ==
=== Transfers in ===
Date	Pos.	Player	Transferred from	Fee	Ref.
10 July 2024	MF	Christopher Simon (SEN)	Génération Foot (SEN)	Free transfer	
16 July 2024	FW	Kaan Caliskaner (GER)	Eintracht Braunschweig (GER)	Free transfer	
28 January 2025	MF	Jakub Łabojko (POL)	Unattached	Free transfer	

=== Loans in ===
Date	Pos.	Player	Transferred from	Duration	Ref.
3 July 2024	MF	Krzysztof Kubica (POL)	Benevento (ITA)	One-year loan	
23 January 2025	MF	Antonio Sefer (ROU)	Hapoel Be'er Sheva (ISR)	Until end of season	

=== Transfers out ===
Date	Pos.	Player	Transferred to	Fee	Ref.
30 June 2024	DF	Przemyslaw Szarek (POL)	Chrobry Głogów	Free transfer	

=== Loans out ===
Date	Pos.	Player	Transferred to	Duration	Ref.
26 July 2024	DF	Konrad Magnuszewski (POL)	Skra Częstochowa		

== Friendlies ==
=== Pre-season ===
22 June 2024 Friendly	Korona Kielce (Poland)	1–1	(Poland) Motor Lublin	Kielce
14:00	Sewerzyński 86'		Ndiaye 38'	Stadium: Stadion Kusocińskiego

29 June 2024 Friendly	Widzew Łódź (Poland)	1–2	(Poland) Motor Lublin	Łódź
12:00	Sobol 76' (pen.)		Śpiewak 100'; Orlik 106'	Stadium: Widzew Łódź Stadium
Note: 4 × 30 minutes

6 July 2024 Friendly	Motor Lublin (Poland)	1–0	(Poland) Resovia Rzeszów	Lublin
11:00	Ndiaye 23'

6 July 2024 Friendly	Motor Lublin (Poland)	0–3	(Poland) Znicz Pruszkow	Lublin
14:00			Majewski 21'; Karol 75'; Stanclik 77'	Stadium: boczne boisko Areny Lublin

12 July 2024 Friendly	Radomiak Radom (Poland)	1–1	(Poland) Motor Lublin	Radom
13:30	Rocha 53'		Wolski 17'	Stadium: Centrum Sportowo-Szkoleniowe Radomiak

=== Mid-season ===
10 January 2025 Friendly	Motor Lublin (Poland)	2–1	(Poland) Wisła Płock
13:00

17 January 2025 Friendly	Motor Lublin (Poland)	1–1	(Hungary) MTK Budapest
14:30

21 January 2025 Friendly	Jedinstvo Ub (Serbia)	2–1	(Poland) Motor Lublin
09:30

25 January 2025 Friendly	Motor Lublin (Poland)	2–1	(Georgia (country)) Dinamo Batumi

== Competitions ==
=== Ekstraklasa ===
==== League table ====
Pos	Team	Pld	W	D	L	GF	GA	GD	Pts	Qualification or relegation
5	Legia Warsaw	34	15	9	10	60	45	+15	54	Qualification for Europa League first qualifying round (Note: The 2024–25 Polish Cup winners (Legia Warsaw) qualify for the Europa League first qualifying round.)
6	Cracovia	34	14	9	11	58	53	+5	51	
7	Motor Lublin	34	14	7	13	48	59	−11	49 (Note: Ranked based on head-to-head points: Motor Lublin 4 pts, GKS Katowice - 1 pt.)	
8	GKS Katowice	34	14	7	13	49	47	+2	49	
9	Górnik Zabrze	34	13	8	13	43	39	+4	47	

Source: ekstraklasa.org 90minut.pl
Rules for classification: 1) Points; 2) Head-to-head points; 3) Head-to-head goal difference; 4) Goal difference; 5) Goals scored; 6) Number of wins; 7) Number of away wins; 8) Lower number of points based on yellow and red cards (red card = 3 points, yellow card = 1 point, sending-off = 3 points - including 1 point for first yellow card); 9) Fairplay ranking; 10) Draw.
(Note: Head-to-head record is used only after all the matches between the teams in question have been played)

==== Matches ====
Ekstraklasa match details
Date	Opponent	Venue	Result F–A	Scorers	Attendance	Ref.
21 July 2024	Raków Częstochowa	Home	0–2		14,158	
26 July 2024	Lechia Gdańsk	Away	2–0	Mráz 71', Ceglarz 74'	14,223	
4 August 2024	Korona Kielce	Home	1–1	Ceglarz 83' pen.	14,562	
16 August 2024	GKS Katowice	Away	0–0		6,684	
24 August 2024	Puszcza Niepołomice	Home	0–0		10,993	
1 September 2024	Legia Warsaw	Away	2–5	Rudol 9', Ndiaye 90'	27,142	
13 September 2024	Górnik Zabrze	Home	1–0	Simon 49'	12,497	
22 September 2024	Stal Mielec	Away	0–1		5,210	
25 September 2024	Jagiellonia Białystok	Home	0–2		10,812	(Note: Match was originally scheduled for 10 August 2024, but rescheduled due to Jagiellonia Białystok's participation in the UEFA Champions League)
28 September 2024	Śląsk Wrocław	Home	2–1	Simon 83', Bartoš 90+8' pen.	14,436	
5 October 2024	Lech Poznań	Away	2–1	Mráz 25', 54'	24,368	
19 October 2024	Widzew Łódź	Home	3–4	Ceglarz 1', Rudol 14', Wełniak 86'	13,357	
26 October 2024	Cracovia	Away	2–6	Stolarski 2', Scalet 8'	10,007	
2 November 2024	Pogoń Szczecin	Home	4–2	M. Król 8', 38', Mráz 28', Ndiaye 75'	13,719	
8 November 2024	Piast Gliwice	Away	3–2	Mráz 8', 38', 75'	4,311	
22 November 2024	Zagłębie Lubin	Away	2–1	Ceglarz 44' pen., Mráz 79'	3,364	
2 December 2024	Radomiak Radom	Home	1–0	Stolarski 21'	13,784	
7 December 2024	Raków Częstochowa	Away	2–2	Bartoš 32', Mráz 73'	5,500	
1 February 2025	Lechia Gdańsk	Home	1–1	Wolski 78'	13,161	
9 February 2025	Korona Kielce	Away	0–1		9,544	
16 February 2025	Jagiellonia Białystok	Away	0–3		12,439	
24 February 2025	GKS Katowice	Home	3–2	Ceglarz 15', Van Hoeven 21', Mráz 57'	11,856	
2 March 2025	Puszcza Niepołomice	Away	1–0	Najemski 29'	2,000	
10 March 2025	Legia Warsaw	Home	3–3	Van Hoeven 37', Mráz 65', 90+9'	15,200	
15 March 2025	Górnik Zabrze	Away	0–4		13,179	
30 March 2025	Stal Mielec	Home	4–1	Mądrzyk 28' o.g., Ede 49', Łabojko 60', Mráz 82'	14,195	
5 April 2025	Śląsk Wrocław	Away	1–1	Ndiaye 76'	26,361	
13 April 2025	Lech Poznań	Home	1–2	M. Król 76'	15,200	
19 April 2025	Widzew Łódź	Away	2–1	Wolski 43' pen., Ceglarz 72'	17,246	
26 April 2025	Cracovia	Home	0–1		14,777	
9 May 2025	Piast Gliwice	Home	1–4	Augustin 3'	13,344	
14 May 2025 (Note: Match was originally scheduled for 3/4 May 2025 but was rescheduled due to Pogoń Szczecin's participation in the Polish Cup final.)	Pogoń Szczecin	Away	0–3		13,662	
18 May 2025	Zagłębie Lubin	Home	1–0	Mráz 1'	12,265	
24 May 2025	Radomiak Radom	Away	3–2	Ndiaye 14', Mráz 53', 57'	8,555	

=== Polish Cup ===
Polish Cup match details
Round	Date	Time	Opponent	Venue	Result F–A	Scorers	Attendance	Ref.
First round	2 October 2024	19:00	Unia Skierniewice	Away	1–1 (a.e.t.) (4–5 p)	Luberecki 54'		
