= Michał Fidziukiewicz =

Polish footballer

Personal information
- Full name: Michał Fidziukiewicz
- Date of birth: 8 February 1991 (age 35)
- Place of birth: Białystok, Poland
- Height: 1.86 m (6 ft 1 in)
- Position: Forward

Youth career
- MOSP Białystok

Senior career*
Years	Team	Apps	(Gls)
2008–2013	Jagiellonia Białystok	11	(0)
2010	→ Ruch Wysokie Mazowieckie (loan)	29	(4)
2011	→ Dąb Dąbrowa Białostocka (loan)	16	(13)
2012	→ Gryf Wejherowo (loan)	30	(18)
2013–2015	Bocholter	61	(34)
2015–2017	Zagłębie Sosnowiec	46	(16)
2017–2018	GKS Tychy	24	(1)
2018–2019	Olimpia Elbląg	27	(5)
2019–2021	Stal Stalowa Wola	51	(28)
2021	Garbarnia Kraków	19	(9)
2021–2022	Motor Lublin	35	(19)
2022–2023	Polonia Warsaw	31	(11)
2023–2025	Wieczysta Kraków	43	(13)
2025–2026	KS Goczałkowice-Zdrój	33	(5)

International career
2009	Poland U18		
2009	Poland U19		
- * Club domestic league appearances and goals as of 23:33, 3 June 2026 (UTC)

Michał Fidziukiewicz (born 8 February 1991) is a Polish professional footballer who plays as a forward.

== Club career ==
He is a MOSP Białystok home-grown. Fidziukiewicz also represented Jagiellonia Białystok, Ruch Wysokie Mazowieckie, Dąb Dąbrowa Białostocka, Gryf Wejherowo, Bocholter, Zagłębie Sosnowiec, GKS Tychy and Olimpia Elbląg. In June 2019, he became a player of Stal Stalowa Wola, signing a two-year contract. On 14 January 2021, his contract with Stal was terminated. On 29 January 2021, he signed a half-year deal with II liga club Garbarnia Kraków.

Fidziukiewicz was Polonia Warsaw's lead scorer in their 2022–23 II liga championship season, and shortly after, on 9 June 2023, he signed a two-year deal with III liga club Wieczysta Kraków. On 14 January 2025, he left the club by mutual consent.

The following day, he joined III liga side LKS Goczałkowice-Zdrój.

== Career statistics ==
As of match played 17 April 2026

Appearances and goals by club, season and competition
Club	Season	League			National cup (Note: Includes Polish Cup)		Other		Total	
Club	Season	Division	Apps	Goals	Apps	Goals	Apps	Goals	Apps	Goals
Jagiellonia Białystok	2008–09	Ekstraklasa	8	0	1	0	3 (Note: Appearances in Ekstraklasa Cup)	2	12	2
Jagiellonia Białystok	2009–10	Ekstraklasa	1	0	0	0	0	0	1	0
Jagiellonia Białystok	2012–13	Ekstraklasa	2	0	1	0	0	0	3	0
Jagiellonia Białystok	Total		11	0	2	0	3	2	16	2
Ruch Wysokie Mazowieckie	2010–11	II liga East	29	4	0	0	—		29	4
Dąb Dąbrowa Białostocka	2011–12	III liga, gr. B	16	13	—		—		16	13
Gryf Wejherowo	2011–12	III liga, gr. D	13	11	2	0	—		15	11
Gryf Wejherowo	2012–13	II liga West	17	7	0	0	—		17	7
Gryf Wejherowo	Total		30	18	2	0	—		32	18
Bocholter	2013–14	Derde klasse	29	18	?	?	0	0	29	18
Bocholter	2014–15	Derde klasse	32	16	?	?	0	0	32	16
Bocholter	Total		61	34	?	?	0	0	61	34
Zagłębie Sosnowiec	2015–16	I liga	31	12	6	2	—		37	14
Zagłębie Sosnowiec	2016–17	I liga	15	4	0	0	—		15	4
Zagłębie Sosnowiec	Total		46	16	6	2	—		52	18
GKS Tychy	2017–18	I liga	24	1	3	1	—		27	2
Olimpia Elbląg	2018–19	I liga	27	5	1	0	—		28	5
Stal Stalowa Wola	2019–20	II liga	31	10	3	2	—		34	12
Stal Stalowa Wola	2020–21	III liga, gr. IV	20	18	2	1	—		22	19
Stal Stalowa Wola	Total		51	28	5	3	—		56	31
Garbarnia Kraków	2020–21	II liga	19	9	0	0	—		19	9
Motor Lublin	2021–22	II liga	33	19	2	1	2 (Note: Appearances in II liga promotion play-offs)	0	37	20
Polonia Warsaw	2022–23	II liga	31	11	0	0	—		31	11
Wieczysta Kraków	2023–24	III liga, gr. IV	33	13	1	0	—		34	13
Wieczysta Kraków	2024–25	II liga	10	0	0	0	—		10	0
Wieczysta Kraków	Total		43	13	1	0	—		44	13
KS Goczałkowice-Zdrój	2024–25	III liga, gr. III	12	2	—		—		12	2
KS Goczałkowice-Zdrój	2025–26	III liga, gr. III	21	3	—		—		21	3
KS Goczałkowice-Zdrój	Total		33	5	—		—		33	5
Career total			454	176	22	7	5	2	481	185

== Honours ==
Gryf Wejherowo

- III liga Pomerania–West Pomerania: 2011–12

Stal Stalowa Wola

- Polish Cup (Stalowa Wola regionals): 2020–21

Polonia Warsaw

- II liga: 2022–23

Wieczysta Kraków

- III liga, group IV: 2023–24

LKS Goczałkowice-Zdrój II

- Polish Cup (Silesia regionals): 2024–25

Individual

- II liga top scorer: 2021–22
