= Michał Trąbka =

Polish footballer

Personal information
- Date of birth: 22 April 1997 (age 29)
- Place of birth: Ruda Śląska, Poland
- Height: 1.73 m (5 ft 8 in)
- Position: Midfielder

Team information
- Current team: GKS Tychy
- Number: 19

Youth career
- –2010: Gwiazda Ruda Śląska
- 2010–2013: Górnik Zabrze

Senior career*
Years	Team	Apps	(Gls)
2013–2014	Górnik Zabrze II	2	(0)
2014–2017	Legia Warsaw II	53	(4)
2017	Rozwój Katowice	12	(0)
2017–2018	Gryf Wejherowo	14	(2)
2018–2019	Stal Stalowa Wola	49	(6)
2019–2023	ŁKS Łódź	123	(11)
2023–2024	Stal Mielec	18	(1)
2024–2026	Wieczysta Kraków	67	(8)
2026	Wieczysta Kraków II	2	(0)
2026–	GKS Tychy	0	(0)
- * Club domestic league appearances and goals as of 21:11, 31 May 2026 (UTC)

Michał Trąbka (born 22 April 1997) is a Polish professional footballer who plays as a midfielder for II liga club GKS Tychy.

== Career ==
In 2018, he signed for Stal Stalowa Wola. As a ŁKS Łódź footballer, he played 30 games in the Poland top-tier Ekstraklasa, and scored his only goal of the season in the match against Raków Częstochowa.

On 29 January 2024, Trąbka completed a move from Stal Mielec to the III liga side Wieczysta Kraków, signing a two-and-a-half-year deal. He won three consecutive promotions with Wieczysta before being released in June 2026.

On 24 June 2026, Trąbka agreed to join II liga side GKS Tychy on a deal until 2028.

== Honours ==
ŁKS Łódź

- I liga: 2022–23

Wieczysta Kraków

- III liga, group IV: 2023–24

Wieczysta Kraków II

- IV liga Lesser Poland: 2025–26
