= Izolator Boguchwała =

Polish football club

- Full name: Zakładowy Klub Sportowy Izolator Boguchwała
- Nickname: Izolacja
- Founded: 1944; 82 years ago
- Ground: Izo Arena
- Capacity: 954
- Chairman: Krzysztof Gubernat
- Manager: Krzysztof Szpond
- League: IV liga Subcarpathia
- 2025–26: IV liga Subcarpathia, 2nd of 18
- Website: http://www.zksizolator.eu
Home colours	Away colours

Izolator Boguchwała is a Polish football club based in the city of Boguchwała in the Rzeszów County. They currently play in the IV liga Subcarpathia.

== History ==
The club was founded in 1944. Affiliated with the local porcelain factory, it was officially registered on 1 November 1947.

In the 1980s and mid 1990s, they played regularly in the third league, in which their finished third in the 1986–87 season.

== Stadium ==
Their stadium is Izo Arena. It was opened in 1947 as the first stadium in the Rzeszów County and built by the porcelain factory workers.

== Players ==
=== Current squad ===
As of 2 August 2022

Note: Flags indicate national team as defined under FIFA eligibility rules; some limited exceptions apply. Players may hold more than one non-FIFA nationality.

No.	Pos.	Nation	Player
2	DF	POL	Radoslaw Łeń
3	DF	POL	Michał Cach
4	DF	POL	Michał Bogacz
5	DF	POL	Aleksander Gajdek
6	DF	POL	Krystian Wilk
7	MF	POL	Konrad Kowal
8	MF	POL	Piotr Buda

No.	Pos.	Nation	Player
9	MF	POL	Eryk Ciemierkiewicz
10	MF	POL	Marcin Dobrzański
11	MF	POL	Kacper Penar
12	MF	POL	Michał Worosz
12	FW	POL	Marcin Dudek
13	FW	POL	Michał Daniel
14	FW	POL	Michał Daniel

=== Out on loan ===
Note: Flags indicate national team as defined under FIFA eligibility rules; some limited exceptions apply. Players may hold more than one non-FIFA nationality.

No. / Pos. / Nation / Player; - / GK / POL / Dawid Ziobro (on loan to (Poland) Jedność Niechobrz)	No. / Pos. / Nation / Player

== See also ==
- Boguchwała
- Football in Poland
- List of football clubs in Poland
