= Dávid Haščák =

Slovak footballer

Personal information
- Full name: Dávid Haščák
- Date of birth: 28 October 1998 (age 28)
- Place of birth: Stará Ľubovňa, Slovakia
- Height: 1.81 m (5 ft 11 in)
- Position: Midfielder

Team information
- Current team: Poprad
- Number: 18

Youth career
- –2013: Lipany
- 2013–2016: Tatran Prešov

Senior career*
Years	Team	Apps	(Gls)
2017	Tatran Prešov	2	(0)
2017–	Podbrezová II	18	(2)
2017–	Podbrezová	3	(0)
2018–2019	→ Lipany (loan)	19	(2)
2019	→ OFK SIM Raslavice (loan)		
2020	→ Bardejov (loan)	0	(0)
2020–2021	LZS Starowice Dolne	23	(15)
2021	Stal Stalowa Wola	5	(1)
2021–2022	Tatran Prešov		
2022–2023	Bardejov		
2023	Stará Ľubovňa		
2023–	Poprad		
- * Club domestic league appearances and goals as of 22 May 2024

Dávid Haščák (born 28 October 1998) is a Slovak professional footballer who plays as a midfielder for Poprad.

== Club career ==
=== 1. FC Tatran Prešov ===
Haščák made his professional Slovak Super Liga debut for 1. FC Tatran Prešov against Slovan Bratislava on 19 February 2017.

=== LZS Starowice Dolne ===
In summer 2020, Haščák signed a deal with Polish IV liga club LZS Starowice Dolne. He helped his team to secure a second place after the autumn round, scoring 15 goals in 23 games.

=== Stal Stalowa Wola ===
On 9 February 2021, he joined Polish III liga side Stal Stalowa Wola for the 2020–21 summer round. He made his debut on 27 March as a substitute against Wólczanka Wólka Pełkińska. He scored his first goal in the last game of the season, on 20 June 2021 in a 2–2 draw against Podhale Nowy Targ. Separately from the first club, he also played for their IV liga reserves. His contract with Stal was terminated in August 2021.
