= Piotr Witasik =

Polish footballer (born 1992)

Personal information
- Full name: Piotr Witasik
- Date of birth: 4 December 1992 (age 33)
- Place of birth: Bełchatów, Poland
- Height: 1.85 m (6 ft 1 in)
- Position: Defender

Team information
- Current team: Wigry Suwałki

Youth career
- –2011: GKS Bełchatów

Senior career*
Years	Team	Apps	(Gls)
2011–2017	GKS Bełchatów	60	(1)
2013–2014	GKS Bełchatów II	21	(0)
2017–2018	Siarka Tarnobrzeg	29	(1)
2018–2019	Olimpia Grudziądz	23	(2)
2019–2021	Stal Stalowa Wola	42	(2)
2021–2022	Olimpia Grudziądz	49	(6)
2022–2025	Kotwica Kołobrzeg	67	(3)
2025–2026	ŁKS Łomża	50	(2)
2026–	Wigry Suwałki	0	(0)
- * Club domestic league appearances and goals as of 23:48, 3 June 2026 (UTC)

Piotr Witasik (born 4 December 1992) is a Polish professional footballer who plays as a defender for III liga club Wigry Suwałki.

On 9 August 2020, he was announced the captain of Stal Stalowa Wola for the 2020–21 season. On 15 January 2021, his contract with Stal was terminated. A day later, he rejoined Olimpia Grudziądz.

On 6 July 2022, Witasik signed with II liga side Kotwica Kołobrzeg, joining four Olimpia teammates and manager Marcin Płuska who made the same move during the transfer window. During the 2023–24 season, he made 23 league appearances as Kotwica finished 2nd and earned their first promotion to the second tier.

On 9 February 2025, he moved to III liga club ŁKS Łomża.

On 13 June 2026, Witasik signed a one-year deal with an option to extend with Wigry Suwałki.

== Honours ==
GKS Bełchatów

- I liga: 2013–14

ŁKS Łomża

- Polish Cup (Podlasie regionals): 2024–25
