= Bartłomiej Ciepiela =

Polish footballer

Personal information
- Date of birth: 24 May 2001 (age 25)
- Place of birth: Tarnów, Poland
- Height: 1.82 m (6 ft 0 in)
- Position: Midfielder

Team information
- Current team: Pogoń Grodzisk Mazowiecki

Youth career
- 2010–2016: Igloopol Dębica
- 2016–2018: Legia Warsaw

Senior career*
| Years | Team | Apps | (Gls) |
| 2019–2022 | Legia Warsaw II | 45 | (2) |
| 2019–2020 | → Stal Stalowa Wola (loan) | 27 | (3) |
| 2021–2025 | Legia Warsaw | 7 | (0) |
| 2022–2023 | → Stal Mielec (loan) | 17 | (1) |
| 2023–2024 | → Resovia (loan) | 27 | (1) |
| 2024–2025 | → Znicz Pruszków (loan) | 28 | (0) |
| 2025–2026 | Znicz Pruszków | 28 | (4) |
| 2026– | Pogoń Grodzisk Mazowiecki | 0 | (0) |
- * Club domestic league appearances and goals as of 16:21, 26 May 2026 (UTC)

Bartłomiej Ciepiela (born 24 May 2001) is a Polish professional footballer who plays as a midfielder for I liga club Pogoń Grodzisk Mazowiecki.

He previously represented Igloopol Dębica youth teams, Legia Warsaw and its reserve team, Stal Stalowa Wola, Stal Mielec, Resovia and Znicz Pruszków.

== Club career ==
=== Early years ===
Ciepiela began his career at Igloopol Dębica juniors in 2010. He played for Legia Warsaw's youth teams from 2016 to 2018. In 2019, he was transferred to their senior reserves in the III liga. Ciepiela made his debut for Legia II on 2 June 2019 in the 6–1 away defeat at Lechia Tomaszów Mazowiecki.

=== Stal Stalowa Wola ===
On 24 July 2019, it was announced that the II liga team Stal Stalowa Wola had signed Ciepiela on a one-year loan deal from Legia. Ciepiela made his debut for his new club on 17 August 2019 in a league encounter against Bytovia Bytów. The match ended in the 4–1 defeat for Stal, as he was substituted on for Robert Dadok in the 76th minute. Ciepiela played 29 games, netting 3 goals, for Stal in 2019–20 as the team finished in 15th position, resulting in the club's relegation to the III liga.

=== Legia Warsaw ===
On 29 August 2021, he made his Ekstraklasa debut for Legia, in the 1–0 defeat at Wisła Kraków. On 7 December 2021, his contract was extended to 30 June 2024.

=== Stal Mielec ===
On 20 June 2022, Ciepiela moved on a one-year loan to another Ekstraklasa side Stal Mielec. After finishing the regular season, he returned to Warsaw, to begin preparations for the new campaign with Legia.

=== Resovia ===
On 11 August 2023, Ciepiela was sent on another year-long loan, this time joining I liga side Resovia.

=== Znicz Pruszków ===
On 16 July 2024, he joined another I liga club Znicz Pruszków on a season-long loan. On 8 July 2025, Ciepiela signed with Znicz on a permanent basis.

=== Pogoń Grodzisk Mazowiecki ===
On 8 July 2026, Ciepiela moved to Pogoń Grodzisk Mazowiecki on a one-year deal.

== Honours ==
Legia Warsaw II

- Polish Cup (Masovia regionals): 2018–19
