= Krzysztof Kiercz =

Polish footballer

Personal information
- Full name: Krzysztof Kiercz
- Date of birth: 16 February 1989 (age 37)
- Place of birth: Kielce, Poland
- Height: 1.89 m (6 ft 2 1/2 in)
- Position: Centre-back

Youth career
- –2006: Korona Kielce

Senior career*
Years	Team	Apps	(Gls)
2007–2009	Korona Kielce II		
2009–2015	Korona Kielce	16	(1)
2010	→ LKS Nieciecza (loan)	2	(0)
2011	→ Wierna Małogoszcz (loan)	13	(2)
2016	Odra Opole	7	(2)
2017–2019	Stal Mielec	66	(2)
2019–2020	Stal Stalowa Wola	24	(1)
2020–2021	Broń Radom	20	(1)
2021–2024	Korona Kielce II	76	(13)
- * Club domestic league appearances and goals

Krzysztof Kiercz (born 16 February 1989) is a Polish former professional footballer who played as a centre-back. He most recently served as an assistant coach for Korona Kielce II.

== Career ==
Kiercz is a homegrown of Korona Kielce and was included in its first team in 2009. In 2010 he was loaned to the I liga side LKS Nieciecza, for which he played three matches. In August 2010, he suffered a rupture of the fibula. Initial diagnoses assumed a one-month break in the game, but ultimately Kiercz dropped out of the squad for the entire round. Before the start of the spring round he was present at the tests in the II liga side Wisła Płock. Ultimately, Kiercz found himself on a six-month loan in the III liga side Wierna Małogoszcz, where he played in thirteen matches and scored two goals.

In the autumn round of the 2015–16 Ekstraklasa season, he played a total of four games. In addition, he played in the match against Wda Świecie in the Polish Cup, as the team captain. On 28 December 2015, Korona Kielce confirmed that the contract with him, expiring at the end of the year, will not be extended. On 29 March 2016, he signed a six-month contract to play in Odra Opole. He played for the new club in seven matches, scoring two goals and reaching promotion to the II liga. After the end of the season, Odra decided not to extend the expiring contract.

On 15 July 2016, he signed a contract with Stal Mielec. Kiercz played a total of three seasons for this club, leaving on 30 May 2019. On 6 September 2019, he became a player of the II liga side Stal Stalowa Wola. In August 2020, his contract expired. In November 2020, he joined the III liga side Broń Radom.

== Career statistics ==
Appearances and goals by club, season and competition
Club	Season	League			Polish Cup		Total	
Club	Season	Division	Apps	Goals	Apps	Goals	Apps	Goals
LKS Nieciecza (loan)	2010–11	I liga	2	0	1	0	3	0
Wierna Małogoszcz (loan)	2010–11	III liga, gr. D	13	2	—		13	2
Korona Kielce	2011–12	Ekstraklasa	7	1	1	0	8	1
Korona Kielce	2012–13	Ekstraklasa	4	0	2	0	6	0
Korona Kielce	2013–14	Ekstraklasa	0	0	0	0	0	0
Korona Kielce	2014–15	Ekstraklasa	1	0	0	0	1	0
Korona Kielce	2015–16	Ekstraklasa	4	0	1	0	5	0
Korona Kielce	Total		16	1	4	0	20	1
Odra Opole	2015–16	III liga, gr. F	7	2	—		7	2
Stal Mielec	2016–17	I liga	30	1	1	0	31	1
Stal Mielec	2017–18	I liga	33	1	2	0	35	1
Stal Mielec	2018–19	I liga	3	0	1	0	4	0
Stal Mielec	Total		66	2	4	0	70	2
Stal Stalowa Wola	2019–20	II liga	24	1	3	1	27	2
Broń Radom	2020–21	III liga, gr. I	20	1	—		20	1
Korona Kielce II	2021–22	IV liga Św.	28	6	—		28	6
Korona Kielce II	2022–23	III liga, gr. IV	25	1	—		25	1
Korona Kielce II	2023–24	IV liga Św.	23	6	—		23	6
Korona Kielce II	Total		76	13	0	0	76	13
Career total			224	22	12	1	236	23

== Honours ==
Odra Opole

- III liga Opole–Silesia: 2015–16
- Polish Cup (Opole regionals): 2015–16

Korona Kielce II

- IV liga Świętokrzyskie: 2021–22, 2023–24
