= Boguchwała =

Town in Subcarpathian Voivodeship, Poland

- Aerial view of Boguchwała

- Flag Coat of arms

- Location within Poland
- Coordinates: 49°59′7″N 21°56′21″E
- Country: Poland
- Voivodeship: Subcarpathian
- County: Rzeszów
- Gmina: Boguchwała
- Town rights: 1728-1772, 2008

Government
  - Mayor: Wiesław Kąkol

Area
  - Total: 9.11 km^{2} (3.52 sq mi)

Population (31 December 2021)
  - Total: 6,231
  - Density: 684/km^{2} (1,770/sq mi)
- Time zone: UTC+1 (CET)
  - Summer (DST): UTC+2 (CEST)
- Postal code: 36-040
- Area code: +48 17
- Car plates: RZE
- Website: http://boguchwala.pl

Boguchwała (Polish pronunciation: [bɔɡuˈxfawa]) is a town in Rzeszów County, Subcarpathian Voivodeship, in south-eastern Poland. It is the seat of the administrative district of Gmina Boguchwała. It was officially granted town status on 1 January 2008. The name of the town means "praise to God".

Boguchwała lies approximately 7 kilometres (4 miles) south-west of the regional capital Rzeszów. As of December 2021, it has a population of 6,231.

== History ==
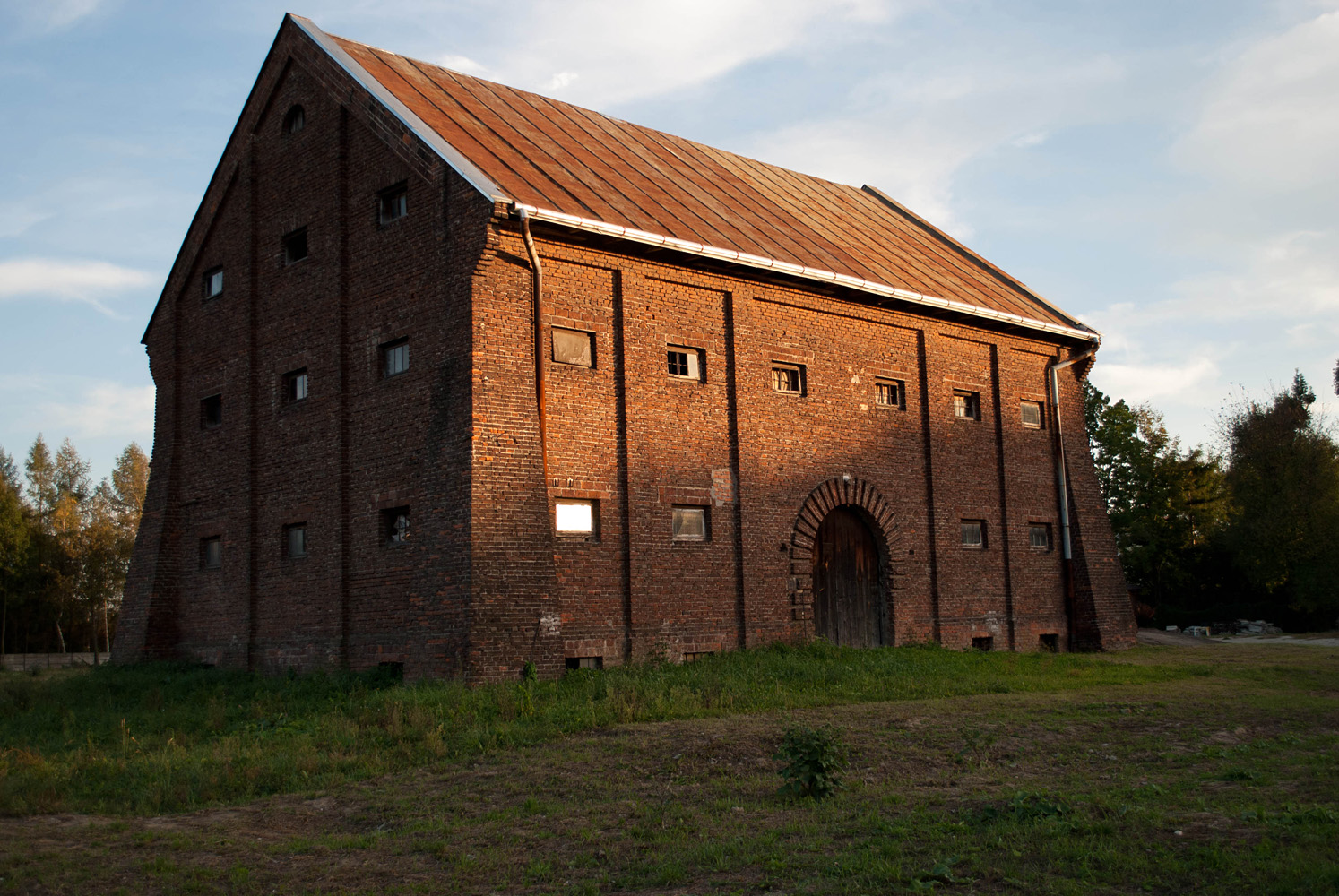
Preserved historic granary

The area was included in the emerging Polish state by its first historic ruler Mieszko I in the 10th century. In 981 it was annexed from Poland by the Kievan Rus', and afterwards, in the High Middle Ages, it changed owners several times between Poland and the Rus', and even fell to the Mongol Empire in the mid-13th century, before it was reintegrated with Poland by King Casimir III the Great in 1340. Near Boguchwała, boundaries of three lands met: Sanok Land, Przemyśl Land, and Sandomierz Land, which was later changed into Sandomierz Voivodeship. Boguchwała itself was part of Sanok Land.

In 1375, Roman Catholic Diocese of Przemyśl was established, covering the lands of Sanok and Przemyśl. Its creation spurred the influx of Polish settlers into the mostly abandoned Carpathian foothills. As a result, several parishes were established in local villages. In late 16th century, several villages near Boguchwała became property of Castellan of Sandomierz, Mikolaj Spytek Ligeza, who was the owner of Rzeszów. The time of relative growth and prosperity ended in 1624, when a Crimean Tatar raid resulted in burning of a number of villages, and deaths of thousands of residents.

In the early 18th century, the Great Northern War brought widespread destruction to Boguchwała and its area. In 1702, Rzeszów and its vicinity was occupied by Swedish forces, which plundered the town. In 1704, Swedes were replaced by Saxon troops, which also robbed local residents. Further destruction was brought in 1715–16, during civil war known as Tarnogrod Confederation.

In 1724, Duke Teodor Lubomirski named Boguchwała main center of his estate, creating the so-called "Boguchwała State". Lubomirski wanted Boguchwała to compete with Rzeszów, and due to his efforts, the village received town charter in 1728, together with a new Rococo-style church. In the early 1740s, Teodor Lubomirski expanded his manor house, turning it into a Baroque palace complex, with a spacious park. In 1772, after the First Partition of Poland, the government of Austrian Galicia voided this decision and Boguchwała lost its town status.

Boguchwała remained in the Habsburg Empire until late 1918. In 1895, the village received rail station, along the newly built line from Rzeszów to Jasło. In the Second Polish Republic, Boguchwała was part of Lwów Voivodeship. According to the 1921 census, it had a population of 1,419, 98.7% Polish and 1.3% Jewish. In spring of 1939, construction of the ZAPEL plant ended, part of the Central Industrial Region.

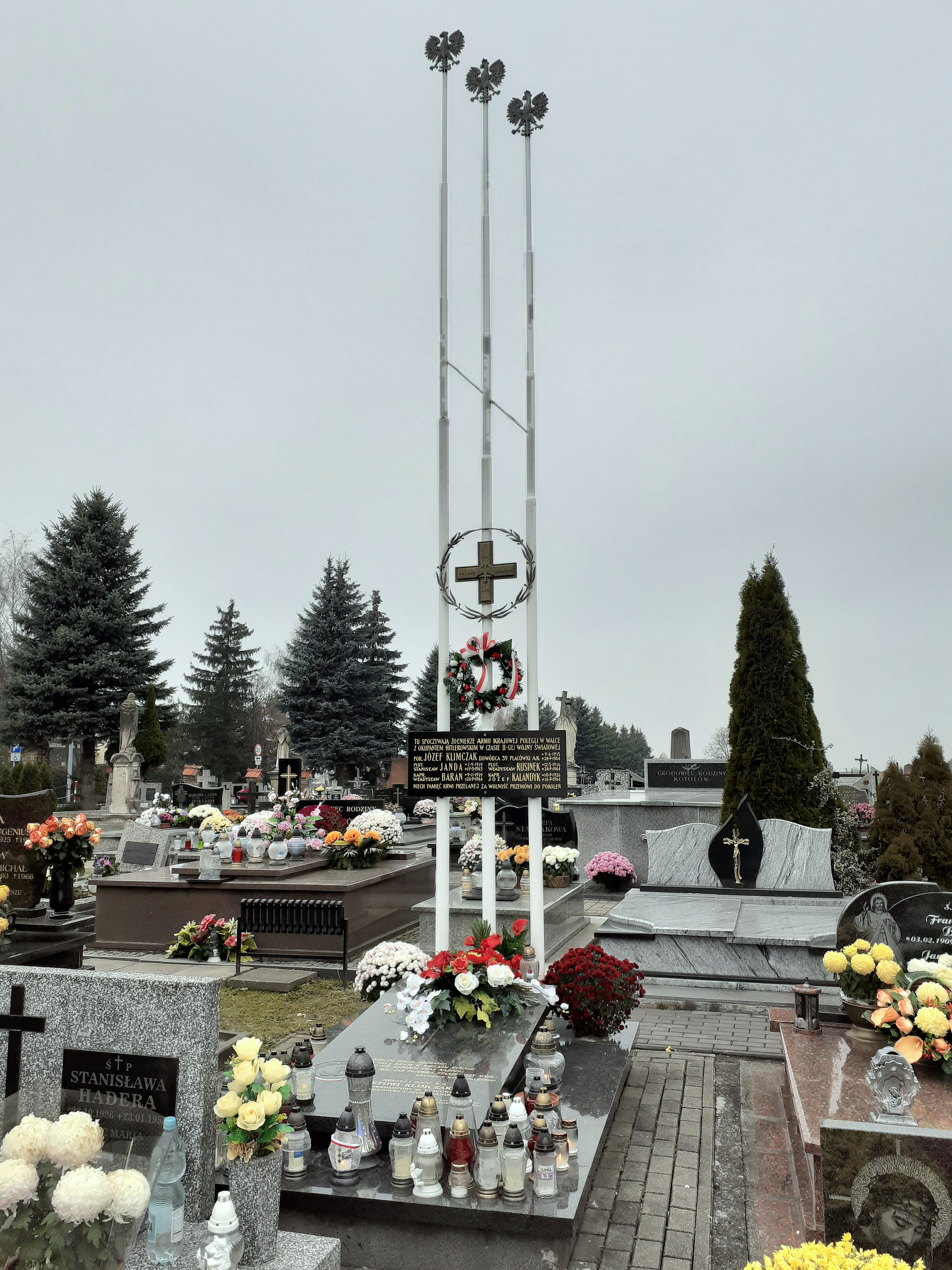
Grave of local Home Army partisans from World War II

During World War II, the Wehrmacht entered Boguchwała on September 6, 1939. Afterwards, it was occupied by Germany. Several Poles, who were either born or lived and worked in Boguchwała, were murdered by the Russians in the Katyn massacre in 1940. The village was an important outpost of the Home Army, and the local unit took part in the Operation Tempest.

Boguchwała recovered its town charter on 1 January 2008.

== Transport ==
=== Road transport ===
National road 19, which is a part of the european route E371, passes through the town.

=== Rail transport ===
Railway line 106 (Jasło - Rzeszów Główny) passes through the town.

== Main sights ==
Lubomirski Palace

Saint Stanislaus church

- Palace and park complex
- Baroque St. Stanisław Church (18th century)
- Monument of the 500th anniversary of the Battle of Grunwald

== Sports ==
Izolator Boguchwała association football club plays at the Izo Arena.
