= Izo Arena =

Football stadium in Boguchwała, Poland

Coordinates: 49.986944°N 21.938056°E

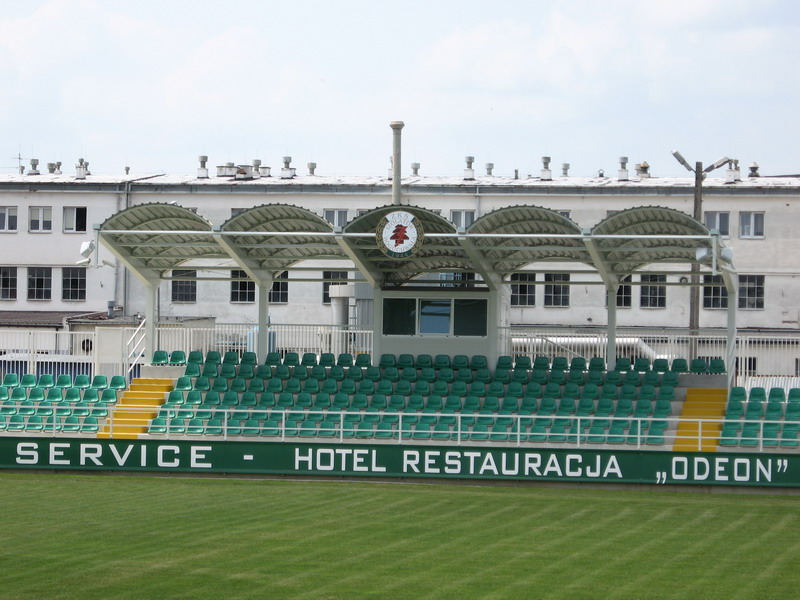
Izo Arena

Izo Arena is a football stadium in Boguchwała, Poland. It opened in 1949 and has been the home stadium of Izolator Boguchwała since its completion. It can seat 943 spectators.

== History ==
The land for the construction of the football field in Boguchwała was obtained after World War II from the management of a nationalized porcelain factory. The facility was put into use in the summer of 1949, and the act of consecration was made by the then pastor of the Boguchwała parish, Fr. Józef Przybyła. In the years 2006–2007, the stadium was thoroughly modernized. On the occasion of the re-opening, on 14 September 2007, a match between the Polish and Romanian under-16 national teams took place at the stadium, which ended with a 3-0 result.

In later years, matches of the youth representation at this stadium were organized several more times. After renovation, the facility was one of the most representative intimate stadiums in the country. In 2014, the stadium became the property of the city. Other clubs also used the stadium from time to time, including Stal Stalowa Wola or Resovia.

On 4 December 2019, the 2019–20 Polish Cup's Round of 16 was played at the stadium, where Stal Stalowa Wola lost 2–0 to Lech Poznań.
