= Wólka Tanewska =

- Village
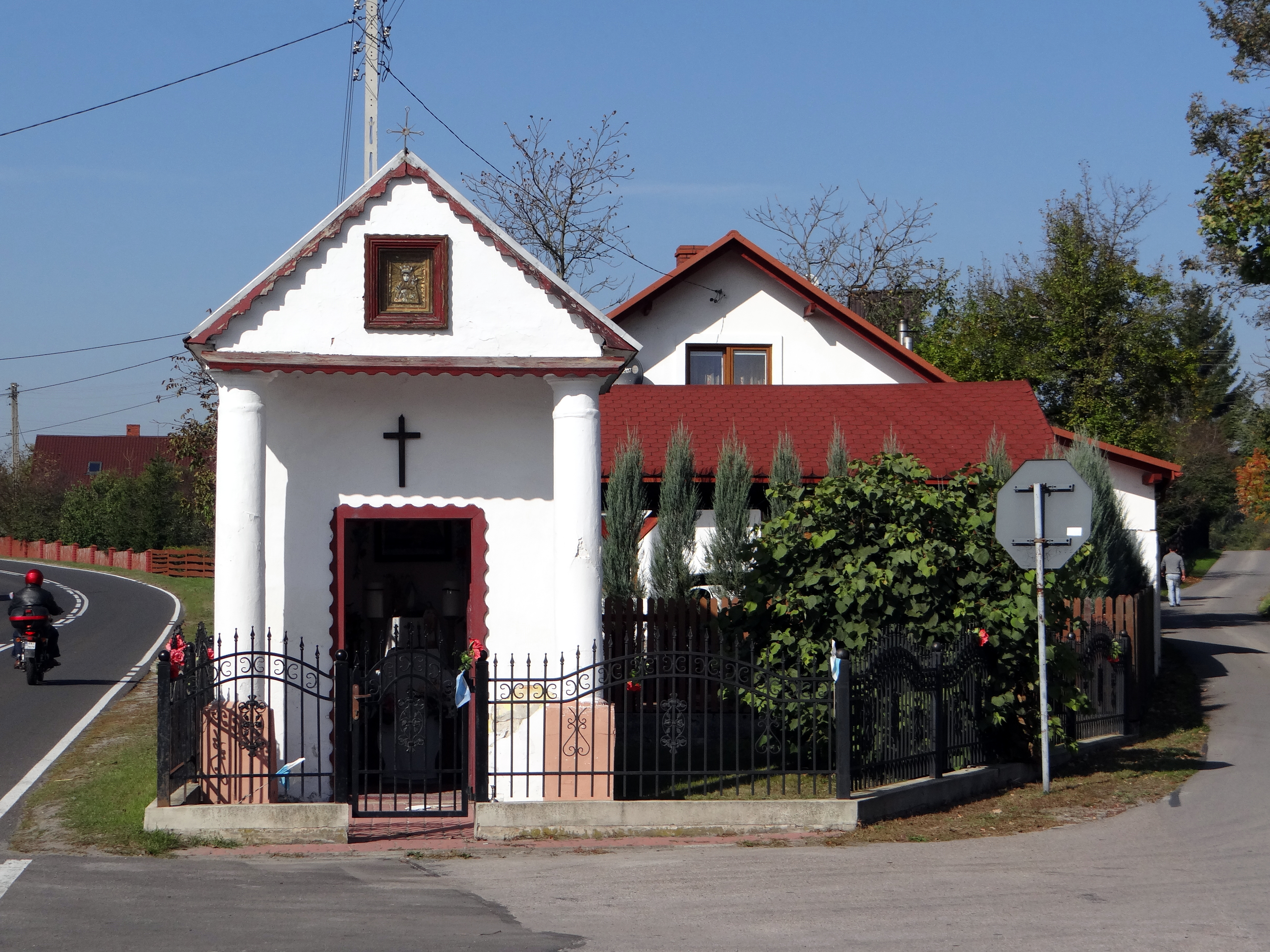
- Wayside shrine in Wólka Tanewska

- Location within Poland
- Coordinates: 50°30′N 22°16′E
- Country: Poland
- Voivodeship: Subcarpathian
- County: Nisko
- Gmina: Ulanów
- Time zone: UTC+1 (CET)
  - Summer (DST): UTC+2 (CEST)
- Vehicle registration: RNI

Wólka Tanewska [ˈvulka taˈnɛfska] is a village in the administrative district of Gmina Ulanów, within Nisko County, Subcarpathian Voivodeship, in south-eastern Poland.

Wólka Tanewska is home to the football club Dolina-Tanew Wólka Tanewska.
