= Michał Płonka =

Polish footballer (born 1992)

Personal information
- Full name: Michał Płonka
- Date of birth: 8 October 1992 (age 34)
- Place of birth: Knurów, Poland
- Height: 1.81 m (5 ft 11 in)
- Position: Central midfielder

Team information
- Current team: Spójnia Landek

Youth career
- 2004–2005: Piast Gliwice
- 2008–2011: Gwarek Zabrze

Senior career*
| Years | Team | Apps | (Gls) |
| 2011–2014 | Górnik Zabrze | 3 | (0) |
| 2014 | Górnik Zabrze II | 12 | (3) |
| 2013 | → Zawisza Bydgoszcz (loan) | 8 | (2) |
| 2014–2016 | ROW 1964 Rybnik | 63 | (9) |
| 2016–2017 | Legionovia Legionowo | 18 | (2) |
| 2017–2019 | Rozwój Katowice | 45 | (7) |
| 2019–2021 | Stal Stalowa Wola | 27 | (2) |
| 2021–2022 | Polonia Bytom | 43 | (7) |
| 2022–2024 | MKS Kluczbork | 56 | (11) |
| 2024–2026 | KS Goczałkowice-Zdrój | 54 | (4) |
| 2026– | Spójnia Landek | 0 | (0) |
- * Club domestic league appearances and goals as of 23:30, 3 June 2026 (UTC)

Michał Płonka (born 8 October 1992) is a Polish professional footballer who plays as a central midfielder for IV liga Silesia club Spójnia Landek.

== Club career ==
In the 2011–12 Ekstraklasa season, Płonka made three appearances for Górnik Zabrze, making his debut in a 4–1 victory over Zagłębie Lubin.

On 27 February 2013, he was loaned to Zawisza Bydgoszcz. In June 2019, he became a player of Stal Stalowa Wola, signing a two-year contract. On 3 February 2021, his contract with Stal was terminated. Two days later, he signed a half-year deal with III liga club Polonia Bytom.

== Honours ==
Zawisza Bydgoszcz

- I liga: 2012–13

Górnik Zabrze II

- Polish Cup (Zabrze regionals): 2013–14

Polonia Bytom

- Polish Cup (Bytom regionals): 2021–22

MKS Kluczbork

- Polish Cup (Opole regionals): 2023–24
