= Rozwój Katowice =

Polish football club

- Full name: Klub Sportowy Rozwój Kopalni; Wujek w Katowicach
- Founded: 27 November 1925; 99 years ago
- Ground: Stadion Rozwoju
- Capacity: 500
- Chairman: Sławomir Mogilan
- Manager: Rafał Bosowski
- League: IV liga Silesia
- 2024–25: 7th of 19
- Website: rozwoj.info.pl
Home colours	Away colours

Rozwój Katowice is a Polish football club located in Katowice. It currently plays in the IV liga Silesia. The team's primary colors are green, yellow, and black.

== Honours ==
- III liga
  - Champions: 2011–12 (Opole–Silesia)

== Current squad ==
As of 19 December 2018.

Note: Flags indicate national team as defined under FIFA eligibility rules; some limited exceptions apply. Players may hold more than one non-FIFA nationality.

No.	Pos.	Nation	Player
1	GK	POL	Bartosz Soliński
2	DF	POL	Damian Lepiarz
4	DF	POL	Szymon Zielonka
5	DF	POL	Dominik Dudek
6	DF	POL	Seweryn Gancarczyk
7	MF	POL	Kamil Łączek
8	FW	POL	Damian Niedojad
9	MF	POL	Tomasz Wróbel
10	MF	POL	Michał Płonka
11	FW	POL	Mateusz Wrzesień
12	GK	POL	Bartosz Golik
13	DF	POL	Przemysław Gałecki

No.	Pos.	Nation	Player
14	MF	POL	Sebastian Olszewski
15	MF	POL	Daniel Kamiński
16	DF	POL	Kajetan Kunka
17	FW	POL	Olivier Lazar
18	DF	POL	Marcin Kowalski
19	MF	POL	Rafał Kuliński
20	FW	POL	Bartosz Marchewka
21	MF	POL	Bartosz Baranowicz
22	GK	POL	Bartosz Neugebauer
24	FW	POL	Patryk Gembicki
26	MF	POL	Przemysław Mońka
27	MF	POL	Daniel Paszek

=== Out on loan ===
Note: Flags indicate national team as defined under FIFA eligibility rules; some limited exceptions apply. Players may hold more than one non-FIFA nationality.

No.	Pos.	Nation	Player
—	MF	POL	Piotr Barwiński (At Sarmacja Będzin until 30 June 2019)
