= Piotr Mroziński =

Polish footballer (born 1992)

Personal information
- Date of birth: 24 August 1992 (age 34)
- Place of birth: Przemyśl, Poland
- Height: 1.81 m (5 ft 11 in)
- Position: Midfielder

Team information
- Current team: JKS Jarosław

Youth career
- Granica Stubno
- Czuwaj Przemyśl

Senior career*
Years	Team	Apps	(Gls)
2008–2010	Stal Mielec	56	(7)
2010–2015	Widzew Łódź	65	(3)
2012–2013	→ Sandecja Nowy Sącz (loan)	23	(0)
2015–2017	Wisła Płock	21	(0)
2017–2018	Pogoń Siedlce	32	(2)
2018–2021	Stal Stalowa Wola	101	(23)
2021–2026	Puszcza Niepołomice	147	(19)
2026–	JKS Jarosław	0	(0)

International career
2010–2011	Poland U19	11	(0)
2011	Poland U20	5	(0)
- * Club domestic league appearances and goals as of 20:29, 26 May 2026 (UTC)

Piotr Mroziński (born 24 August 1992) is a Polish professional footballer who plays as a midfielder for III liga club JKS Jarosław.

== Honours ==
Stal Stalowa Wola

- Polish Cup (Subcarpathia regionals): 2020–21
- Polish Cup (Stalowa Wola regionals): 2020–21

Individual

- I liga Player of the Month: October 2022
