= Szymon Jarosz =

Polish footballer

Personal information
- Full name: Szymon Jarosz
- Date of birth: 6 March 1997 (age 29)
- Place of birth: Bielsko-Biała, Poland
- Height: 1.90 m (6 ft 3 in)
- Position: Centre-back

Youth career
- 2010–2013: Podbeskidzie Bielsko-Biała

Senior career*
Years	Team	Apps	(Gls)
2013–2015	Podbeskidzie Bielsko-Biała	0	(0)
2015–2016	Nadwiślan Góra	25	(0)
2016–2018	Stal Stalowa Wola	59	(3)
2018	Stomil Olsztyn	3	(0)
2018–2021	Stal Stalowa Wola	51	(5)
2021	Olimpia Grudziądz	17	(2)
2021–2022	Polonia Warsaw	25	(1)
Total		180	(11)

International career
2014–2015	Poland U18	5	(0)
- * Club domestic league appearances and goals

Szymon Jarosz (born 6 March 1997) is a Polish former professional footballer who played as a centre-back.

== Club career ==
In his career he was associated with, among others, Podbeskidzie Bielsko-Biała (then in Ekstraklasa) and Stomil Olsztyn (then in I liga). From 2018 to 2021, he played for the II liga (and then, the III liga after the 2019–20 relegation) side Stal Stalowa Wola.

On 6 February 2021, he signed a one-and-a-half-year contract with II liga club Olimpia Grudziądz. On 27 February, he made his debut in a 1–0 victory against Motor Lublin.

He retired from football at the end of 2022 due to an injury, and began working in the IT industry.

== Honours ==
Polonia Warsaw

- II liga: 2022–23
