= Tomasz Wietecha =

Polish footballer

Personal information
- Full name: Tomasz Wietecha
- Date of birth: 6 March 1978 (age 48)
- Place of birth: Stalowa Wola, Poland
- Height: 1.84 m (6 ft 0 in)
- Position: Goalkeeper

Team information
- Current team: Łęg Stany
- Number: 78

Senior career*
Years	Team	Apps	(Gls)
1996–2000	Stal Stalowa Wola		
2000–2001	Pogoń Staszów		
2001–2009	Stal Stalowa Wola		
2009–2013	Stal Rzeszów		
2013–2016	Stal Stalowa Wola		
2016–2018	Sokół Nisko		
2021–2023	Stal Stalowa Wola	17	(0)
2025–2026	Bukowa Jastkowice	3	(0)
2026–	Łęg Stany	10	(0)
- * Club domestic league appearances and goals as of 08:14, 3 July 2026 (UTC)

Tomasz Wietecha (born 6 March 1978) is a Polish footballer who plays as a goalkeeper for regional league club Łęg Stany. Following retirement from professional football, he worked as a goalkeeping coach and team manager for Stal Stalowa Wola.

== Club career ==
Wietecha began his career with Stal Stalowa Wola. In 2000, he moved to Pogoń Staszów, where he reached the third round of the Polish Cup.

Following the 2000–01 season, he returned to Stalowa Wola. In 2016, he joined the fourth-division club Sokół Nisko. In 2019, he took the role of goalkeeping coach at Stal Stalowa Wola, and after the club’s relegation to the third division, he resumed his playing career, rejoining the team in March 2021. His final appearance as a player occurred on 20 June 2021, in the 42nd round of the third division, when Stal Stalowa Wola played to a 2–2 draw against Podhale Nowy Targ, with him featuring for the full 90 minutes.

He joined Stal's technical staff as a team manager in February 2023.

In 2025, he returned to competitive football, joining Bukowa Jastkowice and competing in the Klasa A, an amateur tier within the Polish football league system. In 2026, he continued his playing career at GAS Łęg Stany, remaining active at the same amateur level.

== Honours ==
GAS Łęg Stany

- Klasa A Stalowa Wola I: 2025–26
