= Adam Waszkiewicz =

Polish footballer

Personal information
- Full name: Adam Waszkiewicz
- Date of birth: 6 December 1993 (age 32)
- Place of birth: Łódź, Poland
- Height: 1.84 m (6 ft 1/2 in)
- Position: Right-back

Team information
- Current team: Legionovia Legionowo
- Number: 3

Youth career
- 2006–2009: Huragan Pisz
- 2009–2010: MOSP Jagiellonia Białystok

Senior career*
Years	Team	Apps	(Gls)
2011–2017	Jagiellonia Białystok	17	(0)
2013–2017	Jagiellonia Białystok II	38	(2)
2015–2016	→ Raków Częstochowa (loan)	32	(0)
2017–2021	Stal Stalowa Wola	129	(9)
2021–	Legionovia Legionowo	106	(1)
- * Club domestic league appearances and goals as of 10:20, 24 June 2025 (UTC)

Adam Waszkiewicz (born 6 December 1993) is a Polish professional footballer who plays as a right-back for IV liga Masovia club Legionovia Legionowo.

== Honours ==
Stal Stalowa Wola

- Polish Cup (Stalowa Wola regionals): 2020–21
