= Stal =

Stal, Stål or Štál may refer to:

== People ==
- Carl Stål (1833–1878), Swedish entomologist
- Fanny Stål (1821–1889), Swedish classical pianist
- Tord Stål (1906–1972), Swedish film actor

== Sports ==
=== Norway ===
- IL Stålkameratene, Norwegian sports club

=== Poland ===
- Stal Ostrów Wielkopolski a Polish basketball team, based in Ostrów Wielkopolski
- Stal Gorzów Wielkopolski, a Polish speedway team based in Gorzów Wielkopolski
- Stal Gorzyce, a Polish football club based in Gorzyce
- Stal Kraśnik, a Polish football club based in Kraśnik
- Stal Mielec, a Polish football club based in Mielec
- Stal Sanok, a Polish sports club based in Sanok:
  - Stal Sanok (football)
  - Stal Sanok (ice hockey)
- Stal Stalowa Wola, a Polish sports club based in Stalowa Wola:
  - Stal Stalowa Wola (sports club)
  - Stal Stalowa Wola (basketball)
  - Stal Stalowa Wola (football)
  - Stal Stalowa Wola (ice hockey)
- Stal Rzeszów, a Polish sports club based in Rzeszów:
  - Stal Rzeszów (multi-sports club)
  - Stal Rzeszów (football)
  - Stal Rzeszów (motorcycle speedway)

=== Russia ===
- FC Stal Oryol, a football club
- Stal Volgograd, a football club
- FC Stal Cheboksary, a football club

=== Ukraine ===
- FC Stal Alchevsk, a Ukrainian football team
- FC Stal-2 Alchevsk, the reserve team of Stal Alchevsk
- FC Stal Kamianske, a Ukrainian football club located in Kamianske
- Stal Dniprodzerzhynsk, a Ukrainian football team

== Places ==
- Dolný Štál, a municipality and village in Slovakia
- Stal Stadium (disambiguation), several stadiums

== Transport ==
- Putilov Stal-2, a Russian mid-range passenger aircraft
- Putilov Stal-3, a transport aircraft designed and built in the USSR from 1933
- Putilov Stal-5, a transport aircraft designed in the USSR from 1933. In 1933 Putilov started the design of a flying wing 18 passenger transport

== Other ==
- The Tales of Ensign Stål, epic poem by Johan Ludvig Runeberg
- STAL, Swedish company founded in 1913
- "Stal", by C418 from Minecraft - Volume Beta, 2013

== See also ==
- Stahl
- Staal
