= Stahl =

Family name

Stahl (German: steel) is a surname of German and Swedish origin, which also occurs among Jews and Hutterites. It may refer to:

- Agustín Stahl (1842–1917), Puerto Rican physician, ethnologist, and botanist
- Alexander von Stahl (born 1938), German lawyer, politician, and civil servant
- Armin Mueller-Stahl (born 1930), German actor, painter, writer, and musician
- Arthur Goldstein (1887–1943), German socialist and communist politician, whose pseudonym is "Stahl"
- Ben Stahl (1910–1987), American artist, illustrator, and author
- Ben Stahl (activist) (1915–1998), American political activist
- Carl-Gustaf Ståhl (1920–2016), Swedish officer
- Chick Stahl (1873–1907), American baseball outfielder
- Christian Ernst Stahl (1848–1919), German botanist
- Daniel Stahl (born 1971), American game designer
- Daniel Ståhl (born 1992), Swedish discus thrower
- Elisa Molina de Stahl (1918–1996), Guatemalan social worker and philanthropist
- Floyd Stahl (1899–1996), American collegiate athletics coach
- Franklin Stahl (1929–2025), American molecular biologist and geneticist
- Franz Stahl (born 1962), American guitarist
- Fredrika Stahl (born 1984), Swedish singer and songwriter
- Frieda Stahl (1922–2021), American physicist
- Friedrich Julius Stahl (1802–1861), German constitutional lawyer, political philosopher and politician
- Georg Ernst Stahl (1659–1734), German chemist
- Gerry Stahl (born 1945), American computer scientist, son of Ben Stahl
- Heinrich Stahl (1600–1657), Baltic-German pastor
- Henri H. Stahl (1901–1991), Romanian Marxist cultural anthropologist and social historian
- Henri Joseph Stahl (1877–1942), Romanian stenographer, graphologist, historian, and fiction writer
- Henriette Yvonne Stahl (1900–1984), Romanian novelist and short story writer
- Jake Stahl (1879–1922), American baseball player and manager
- Jean-Baptist Stahl (1869–1932), porcelain artist, creator, and designer of Phanolith
- Jerry Stahl (born 1953), American novelist and screenwriter
- Johann Friedrich Stahl (1718–1790), German forest administrator
- John M. Stahl (1896–1950), American film director and producer
- John Stahl (1953–2022), Scottish actor
- Kjell-Erik Ståhl (1946–2025), Swedish long-distance runner
- Laura Stahl, American voice actress
- Lesley Stahl (born 1941), American television journalist
- Linda Stahl (born 1985), German javelin thrower
- Lisa Stahl (born 1965), American model, actress, and game show host
- Lydia Stahl (1885–?), Soviet spy
- Nick Stahl (born 1979), American actor
- Norman H. Stahl (1931–2023), judge of the United States Court of Appeals
- Pete Stahl, American vocalist
- Richard Stahl (1932–2006), American actor
- Rose Stahl (1868–1955), American actress
- Samuel M. Stahl (born 1939), American Rabbi and writer
- Stephanie Stahl (reporter), medical reporter for KYW-TV
- Stephen Stahl (born 1951), American physician and psychopharmacologist
- Trisha Rae Stahl (born 1973), American actress
- William Harris Stahl (1908–1969), American historian of science

== Other uses ==
- Stahl, Missouri, a community in the United States
- Stahl, the green cavalier and playable character in Fire Emblem Awakening

== See also ==
- Michael Stal (born 1963), German computer scientist
- Staal, Dutch surname, cognate to German Stahl
