= Château de Frauenberg =

Ruined castle in Grand Est, France

Coordinates: 49°08′03″N 7°07′46″E

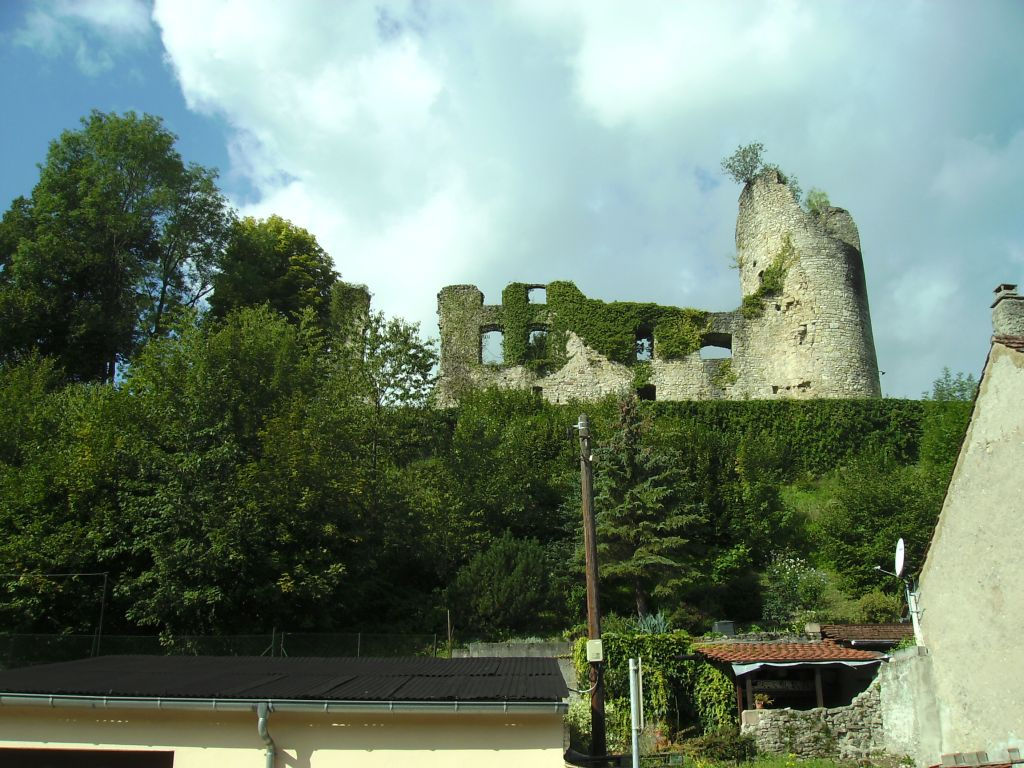
Château de Frauenberg

The Château de Frauenberg is a ruined castle in the commune of Frauenberg in the Moselle département of France.

== History ==
The castle dates from 1350 and occupies a site dominating a valley between France and Germany. It was owned by several families, including the lords of Sierck and the counts of Eberstein. Over time, it was altered and renovated, with significant construction in the 13th, 14th, 17th and 18th centuries. It had been dismantled by Cardinal Richelieu in 1634 and was partly destroyed by fire in 1786. On the eve of the French Revolution, the land was bought by Count Gravier de Vergennes (1719-1787), minister of Louis XVI. The castle housed two pottery kilns which operated in Frauenberg from 1785 to 1791 and were the origin of the notable ceramics company, Villeroy & Boch.

It has been classified since 1921 as a monument historique by the French Ministry of Culture. A restoration project was launched by the commune and the Association pour la Sauvegarde du Château et du Patrimoine de Frauenberg in 2018.

== See also ==
- List of castles in France
