= Stal Stalowa Wola (sports club) =

Polish sports club

ZKS Stal Stalowa Wola
- Full name: Zakładowy Klub Sportowy Stal Stalowa Wola
- Founded: 1938; 88 years ago as Klub Sportowy Stalowa Wola (Sports Club Stalowa Wola)
- Home ground: 15 Hutnicza Street, 37-450 Stalowa Wola

Zakładowy Klub Sportowy Stal Stalowa Wola, shortly ZKS Stal Stalowa Wola or simply Stal Stalowa Wola, is a Polish multi-sports club based in Stalowa Wola, Poland. It operates a men's soccer (training youths), men's basketball and women's basketball sections.

== History ==
In 1938, Feliks Olszak, who was the director of Huta Stalowa Wola, established the Klub Sportowy Stalowa Wola (Sports Club Stalowa Wola). At that time, the club had a pitch without running tracks and stands. The players were amateurs. During this period, training sessions took place after finishing work, and the matches were played on Sunday. The first match took place on May 4, 1939, in the Saint Florian's Day who is the patron saint of steelworkers.

Olympian Lucjan Trela was part of the boxing section of the club.

== Sections ==
=== Current ===
- Stal Stalowa Wola (basketball)
- Stal Stalowa Wola (women's basketball)
- Stal Stalowa Wola (youth football)

=== Historical ===
- Stal Stalowa Wola (football) (disbanded; since 2010 a separate entity)
- Stal Stalowa Wola (ice hockey)
