= Staal =

Staal is a Dutch surname, cognate to German Stahl and Stal in other languages, meaning "steel". Though possibly also of patronymic origin, it may be a metonymic occupational surname referring to a smith. Notable people with the surname include:

- Abraham Staal (1752–1804), Dutch Mennonite teacher and political activist
- Boele Staal (born 1947), Dutch D66 politician
- Ede Staal (1941–1986), Dutch singer-songwriter
- Egor Egorovich Staal (1822–1907), Russian diplomat, ambassador to the UK 1884–1902
- Eric Staal (born 1984), Canadian ice hockey player, brother of Jared, Jordan and Marc
- Flossie Wong-Staal (1947–2020), American virologist and molecular biologist
- Frits Staal (1930–2012), Dutch philosopher and Indologist
- Gert Staal (born 1956), Dutch design publicist
- Herta Staal (1930–2021), Austrian film actress and singer
- Jacob Staal (1913–1981), Dutch commando during World War II
- Jan Frederik Staal (1879–1940), Dutch architect, husband of Margaret
- Jared Staal (born 1990), Canadian ice hockey player, brother of Eric, Jordan and Marc
- Jesper Staal (born 1972), Danish sprint canoer
- Jonas Staal (born 1981), Dutch visual artist
- Jordan Staal (born 1988), Canadian ice hockey player, brother of Eric, Jared and Marc
- Karl Gustav von Staal (1777–1853), Baltic German general of the Russian Army
- Kim Staal (born 1978), Danish ice hockey player
- Marc Staal (born 1987), Canadian ice hockey player, brother of Eric, Jared and Jordan
- Margaret Staal-Kropholler (1891–1966), Dutch architect, wife of Jan Frederik
- Marguerite de Launay, baronne de Staal (1684–1750), French author
- Pierre-Gustave Staal (1817–1882), French lithographer, illustrator and draughtsman
- Viktor Staal (1909–1982), Austrian actor

== See also ==
- Sontaran Commander Staal, fictional character in the sci-fi episodes "The Sontaran Stratagem" and "The Poison Sky"
- Staal Jørpeland IL, a Norwegian Sports club
- Staal Aanderaa (born 1931), Norwegian mathematician
- Staël
- Stahl
- Stal (disambiguation)
- Stals
- Stols
