= Rzegocki =

Rzegocki is a Polish surname. Notable people with the surname include:

- Arkady Rzegocki (born 1971), Polish political scientist
- Alfred Rzegocki (1947–2020), Polish politician
