= Paape =

Paape is a surname. Notable people with the surname include:

- Eddy Paape (1920–2012), Belgian cartoonist
- Gerrit Paape (1752–1803), Dutch poet, journalist, novelist, judge, columnist and ministerial civil servant
- Jürgen Paape, German techno musician and co-owner of the record label Kompakt
