= Stal Stadium =

Stal Stadium may refer to various stadiums in Europe, including:

- Stal Alchevsk Stadium, Ukraine
- Stal Gorzów Wielkopolski Stadium, Poland
- Stal Mielec Stadium, Poland
- Stal Rzeszów Stadium, Poland
- Stal Stalowa Wola Stadium, Poland
  - MOSiR Stadium, first home stadium
  - Subcarpathian Football Center, second home stadium
