= Jean-François Boch =

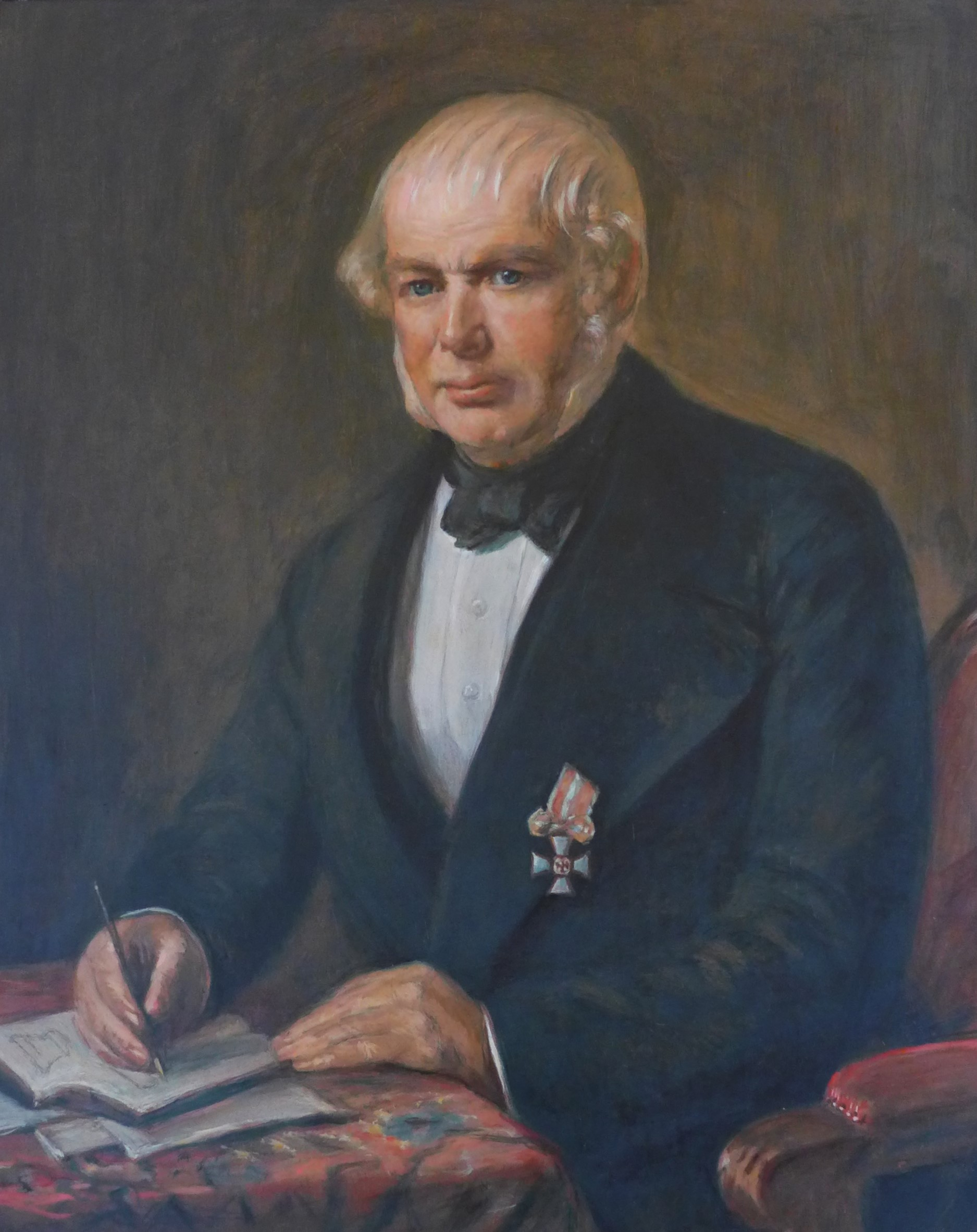

Jean-François Nicolas Boch Buschmann (9 March 1782 – 9 February 1858) was a Luxembourgish manufacturer. He was a member of the third generation of owners of the family pottery business, Jean-François Boch which at that time had its headquarters at Siebenbrunnen a short distance to the north of Luxembourg City. He became the head of the family firm which, in his time, was known chiefly for industrial production of porcelain tableware and tiles.

Reflecting the variety of languages in common use in Luxembourg, sources may identify him under various different names. Older German language sources may refer to him as Johann Franz Boch or Johann Franz Boch-Buschmann. Luxembourgeois and Dutch language sources may identify him as Jean Boch-Buschmann.

== Life ==
=== Family provenance and connections ===
Jean-François Boch was born in the family home at Siebenbrunnen / Sept-Fontaines in Luxembourg. His father was the entrepreneur-industrialist Pierre-Joseph Boch (1737-1818) from Lorraine. His mother, born Marie Antoinette Lucie Nothomb, was from Luxembourg.

In 1806 Boch married Anne Marie Rosalie Buschmann (1785-1870), the daughter of a successful master-tanner from St. Vith.

=== Mettlach ===
Boch learned the business of industrial pottery from his father. When he was 27 he left his parents' home to set up in business independently, buying in 1809 the baroque Benedictine St. Peter's Abbey at Mettlach in the Sarre department. The abbey was available after having been "secularised" in the wake of the French annexation of the region in 1798. Boch set up an ultra modern and highly mechanised ceramics / tableware factory at Mettlach. The machines were operated using hydro-power from a fast flowing stream running into the Sarre on one side of the site. For the ovens used for firing the product, the government imposed the condition that Boch would have to use the soft bituminous coal which was available in abundance locally. This was of technical significance because up to that time no pottery factory in Europe had used this soft coal for its firing ovens. The ovens created at Mettlach were accordingly the first of their kind.

Boch's treatment of his workforce reflected the paternalistic approach of the more enlightened employers of the time, and in 1819 he was able to set up an orphans' support fund for workers' families. A savings and loans bank followed. He set up a "Workers' casino" and a "Reading association" in order to promote the spiritual and moral improvement of his employees.

Business flourished. At the Prussian Exhibition held in 1822 in Berlin Boch was the only manufacturer in the pottery and ceramics sector to receive a gold medal. It was also at this exhibition that Boch met the privy councillor and industrial pioneer Peter Beuth. Shortly after this the two of them undertook a research visit to England in order to study production methods there. Boch spotted a new mechanism for using hydropower to turn wheels/lathes and introduced similar mechanisms in his own factories, which was another first in Continental Europe.

In order to survive the onslaught from English imports, in 1836 Jean-François Boch of Mettlach and his competitor Nicolas Villeroy of Wallerfangen (Saarlouis) merged their businesses, forming Villeroy & Boch. Further expansion followed with the acquisition across the frontier in France of "Utzschneider und Fabry" of Sarreguemines and in Belgium where they established "Keramis". A facility was also set up at Dresden in Saxony.

=== Siebenbrunnen / Sept-Fontaines ===
After he had been able to pass on leadership of the business in Mettlach to his sons, in 1844 Jean-François Boch moved back to Siebenbrunnen / Sept-Fontaines and took over the original family business there. He continued to run the company till his death in 1858. It was here that he developed and put into production a completely new product line, the so-called "Mettlacher Platten" (ceramic floor tiles).

=== Politics ===
In 1849 Jean-François Boch made a brief excursion into the world of politics, serving as a member of the Frankfurt Parliament between 3 January and 30 May. He was one of three representatives from Luxembourg, taking the place previously occupied by Jean-Jacques Willmar, who had to return to Luxembourg after being appointed the Grand duchy's prime minister on 6 December 1848. At Frankfurt Boch did not join any particular faction, but he tended to vote with the Centre-Right members, supporting of the election of the Prussian king as Emperor of the Germans. (The king declined the appointment.) When the parliament discussed the question of a possible German state under Prussian leadership, the three Luxembourg members presented a united front, insisting on certain conditions that would be necessary for Luxembourg to join any such union.

=== Naturalist ===
In 1850 he founded, together with other naturalists and businessmen, the Luxembourg Natural Sciences Society, of which he was the first president.
