= Alfred Rzegocki =

Polish politician (1947–2020)

Alfred Andrzej Rzegocki (14 May 1947 – 29 October 2020) was a Polish politician and basketball manager. From 1997 to 2002 the mayor of Stalowa Wola.

== Biography ==
Born 14 May 1947, in Stalowa Wola, he was the son of Józef and Karolina. Rzegocki graduated from the Electrical Technical School in Nisko and later from the University of Physical Education in Warsaw. He worked at the Stalowa Wola Steelworks. Additionally, he was the coach of the basketball team Stal Stalowa Wola and also served as a manager for the club.

In the 1990s, he became a member of the city council. In 1997, after the death of Andrzej Gajec, he assumed the office of mayor of Stalowa Wola, which he held through the next local government term from 1998 to 2002. In the 2002 direct elections, as a candidate of the local Podkarpackie Forum Samorządowe, he was defeated in the second round by Andrzej Szlęzak. In the 2005 elections, he ran unsuccessfully as an independent candidate on the list of Law and Justice (PiS), and in the 2006 local elections, he again unsuccessfully sought the mayoral office. In the 2010 elections, he returned to local politics, winning a seat on the city council, and in the 2014 and 2018 elections, he was elected to the Stalowa Wola County council as a candidate from the PiS list.

In 2002, he was awarded the Gold Cross of Merit.

He died on 29 October 2020 at a hospital in Sandomierz after contracting COVID-19.
