= Jean-Baptiste Stahl =

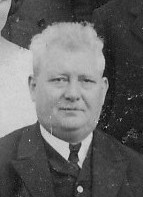
- Jean-Baptiste Stahl in 1924
- Born: 20 June 1869; Oberbetschdorf
- Died: 31 January 1932 (aged 62); Mettlach
- Education: Strasbourg, Höhr-Grenzhausen
- Known for: Phanolith (porcelain)
- Notable work: Phanolith
- Movement: Villeroy & Boch
- Spouse(s): Angela Stahl, born Bausch
- Awards: Gold medal at the 1900 Paris World's Fair
- Website: https://www.kuuunst.de/jean-baptiste-stahl/

Jean-Baptiste Stahl (German: Johann Baptist Stahl) (20 June 1869 – 31 January 1932) was the inventor and designer of the Phanolith. He was born in Oberbetschdorf, Alsace, in 1869, as the son of Louis Stahl (born 1843) and Anna Maria Braun (born 1841)

He grew up in the traditional pottery of his family. His studies of ceramics, modelling and sculpture led him to Strasbourg and Höhr-Grenzhausen. His detailed, translucent and finely worked porcelain reliefs gained him a gold medal at the 1900 Paris World's Fair. Partly influenced by Art Nouveau, Jean-Baptiste Stahl took topics from Greek mythology and rural life. Usually, the white translucent figures are finely set on a blue or green background that partly shines through. Striking is his absolute eye for the detailed modelling of his figures in a very delicate and lively way. In order to increase the three-dimensional illusion, he carefully modulated the transparency of the white porcelain. On the one hand, parts of the scene and figures with higher translucency, i.e. darker tint, were precisely placed to evoke the impression of shadow. On the other hand, he used this means in a way to let parts in the background systematically fade out the further away they should appear. The most prominent figures in a scene show the highest fraction of pure white. In this way Jean-Baptiste Stahl achieves mastery of the so-called pate sur pate style in that his rather flat reliefs of his mature period demonstrate the three-dimensional illusion most prominently. Jean-Baptiste Stahl explored the variation of the translucency of the white porcelain as painters do, who simulate changing lights, shadows, depth and plasticity by varying the brightness of the colours. He signed his work either with JStahl or JS.

In preparation of his porcelain reliefs he made precise pencil drawings that are partially colorized. A fraction of these were rescued post war, from the debris of the Villeroy & Boch factory building, by his grandson Erich Stahl, who was one year old when Jean-Baptiste Stahl died. All of Jean-Baptiste Stahl's work was solely from his lifetime employment at Villeroy & Boch in Mettlach, Saarland, Germany, where he headed the factory's school of drawing. Besides himself, his son Hans Stahl (22 November 1898 – 13 January 1978) was employed as a modeller till retirement in 1963. As an apprentice, his grandson Erich Stahl (born 24 March 1931) learned the old tradition of copper engraving as a pre-stage for the transfer of a certain kind of decors. Out of this craftsmanship he developed his own techniques in a period of over 65 years in the course of his unique work of art. Examples of his work can be found at the Albrecht-Dürer-Foundation in Nürnberg. With Branko Stahl (born 10 June 1963) the art tradition lives on in the Stahl family in the fourth generation.

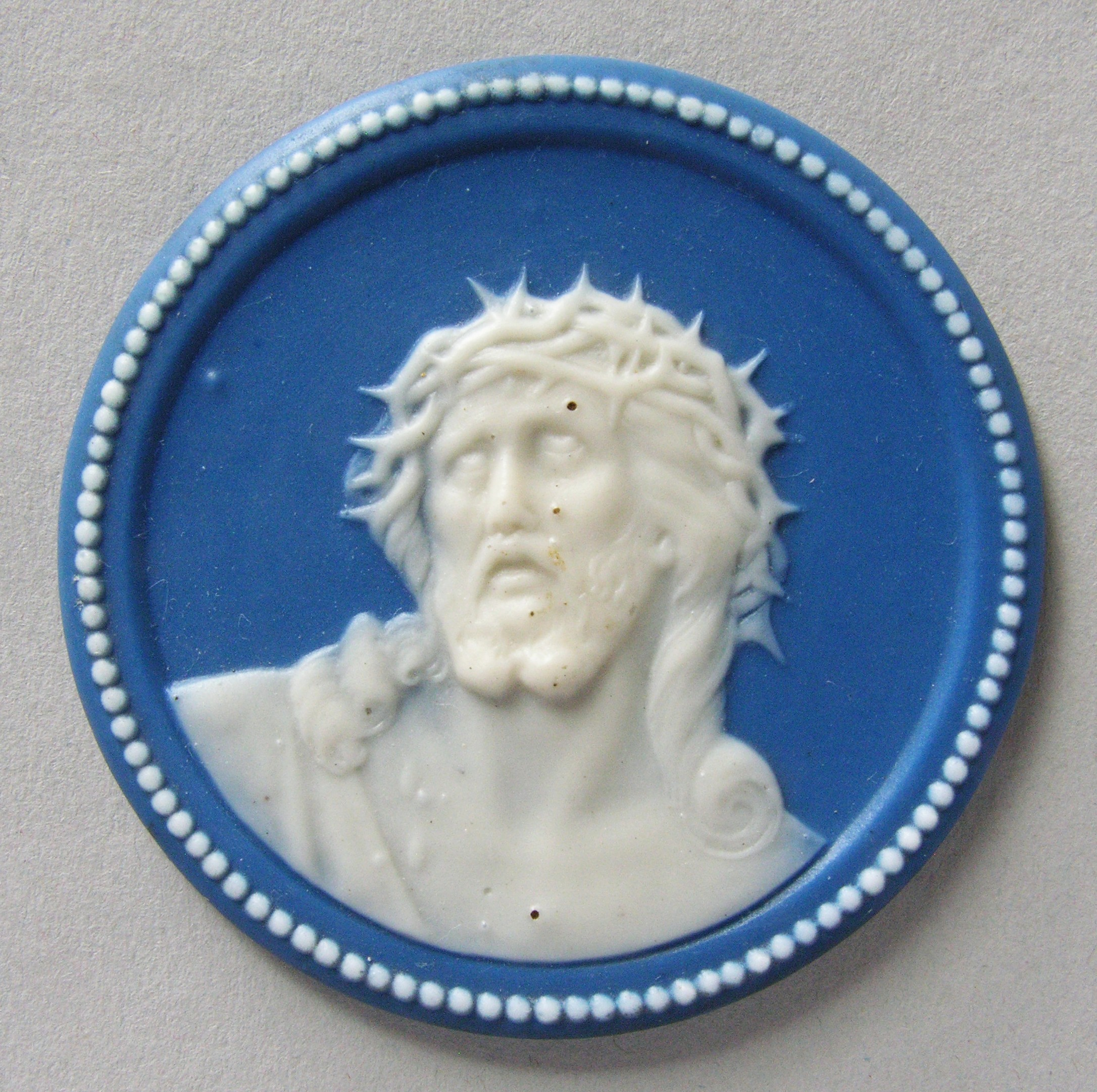
Phanolith in an early stage of JBS's career.

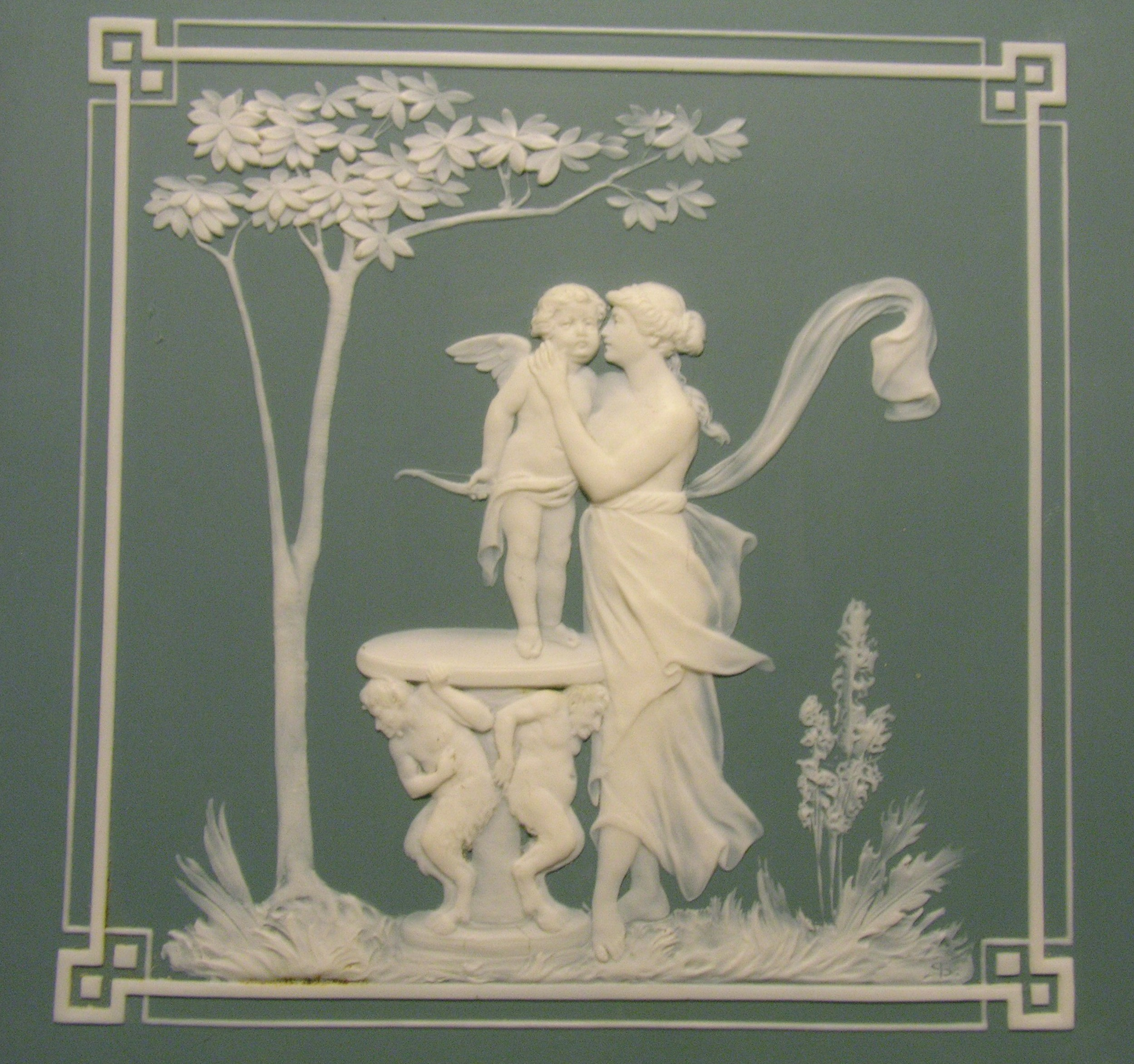
Phanolith plaque at the height of his work.

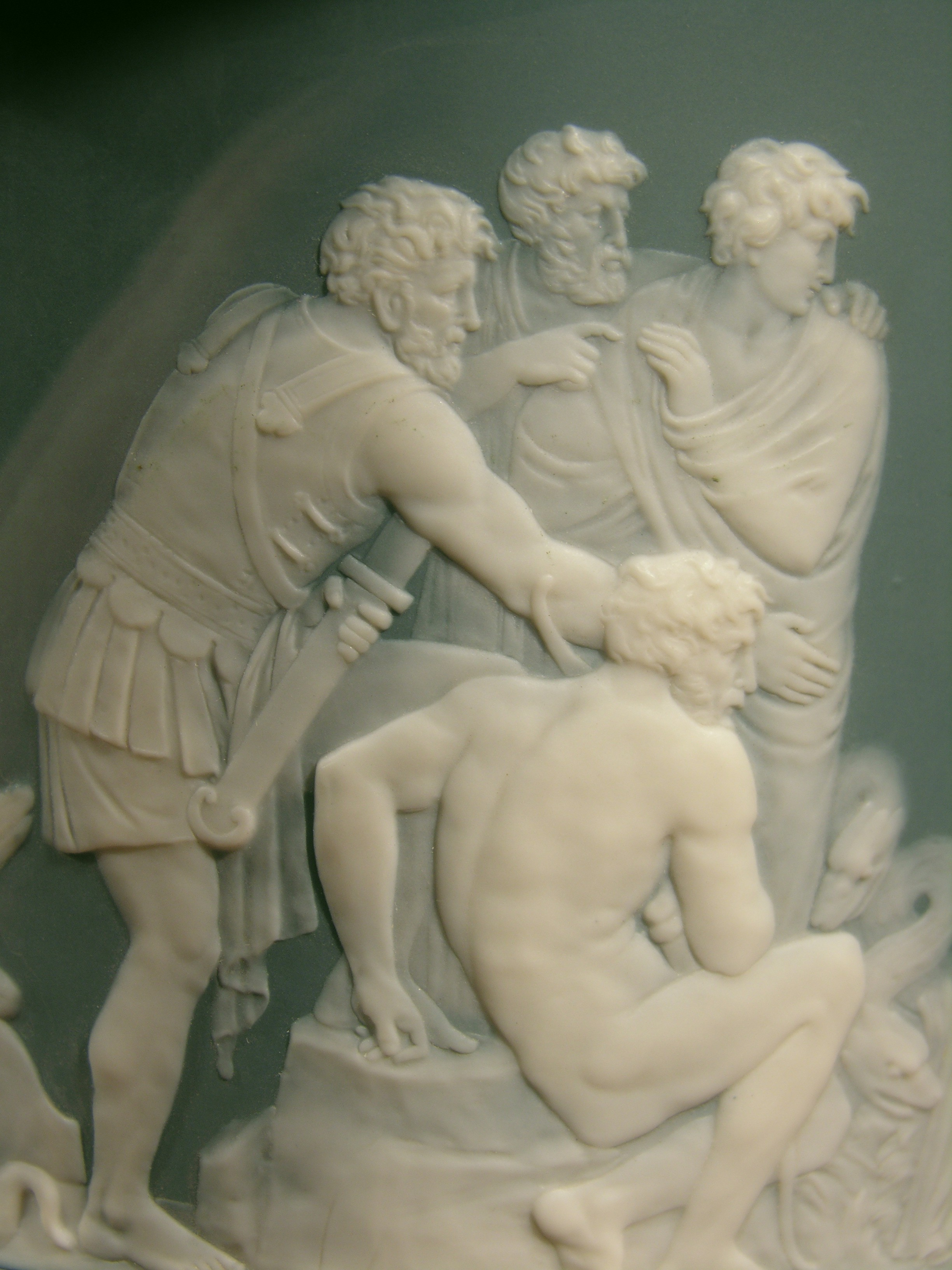
Section from a large cup.

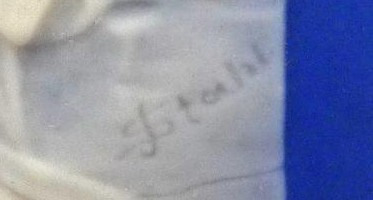
.Full signature JStahl.

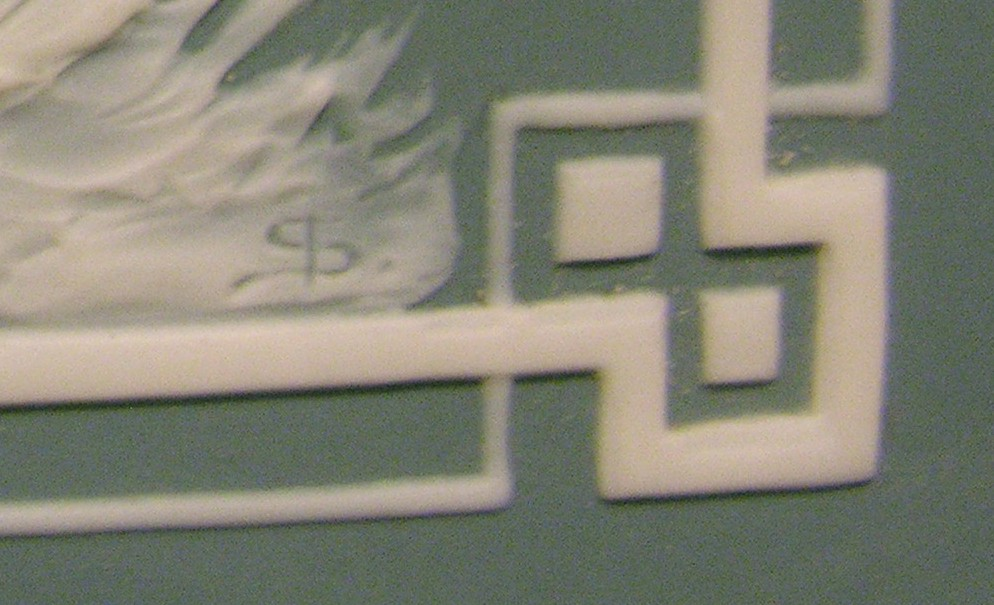
Short signature JS.

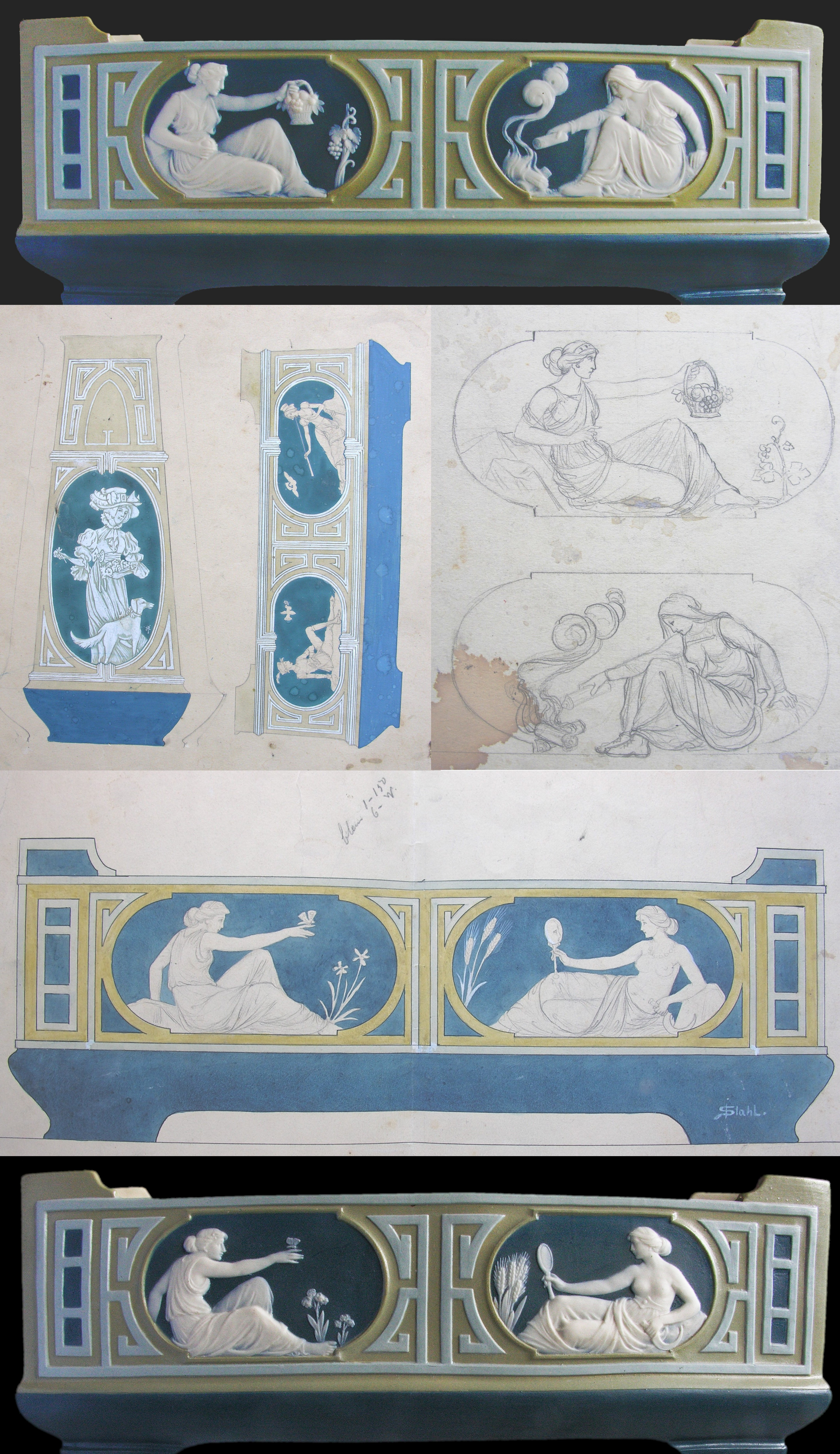
Original blueprint of the Phanolith jardinière.

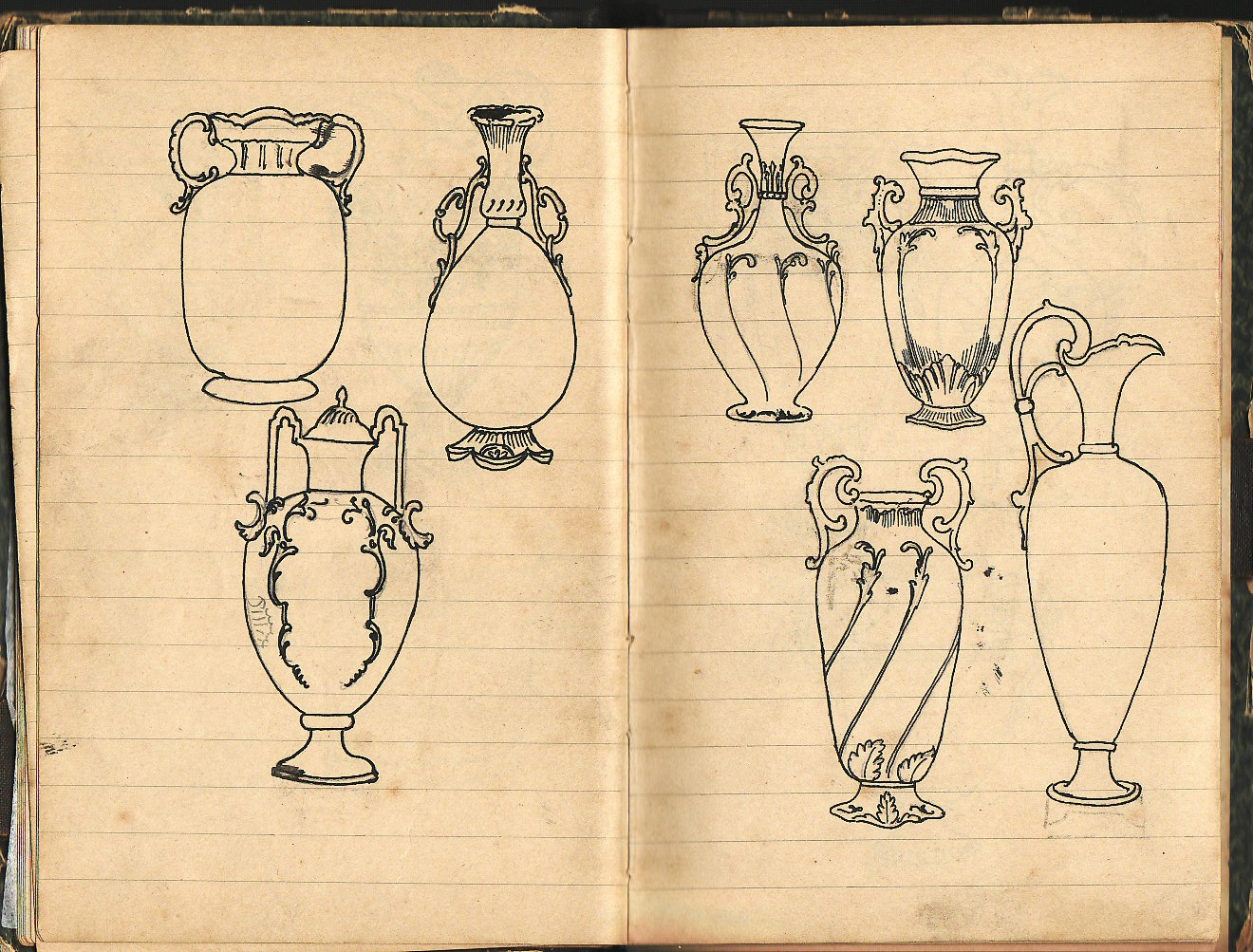
Vases from the Strasbourg sketchbook of 1894.

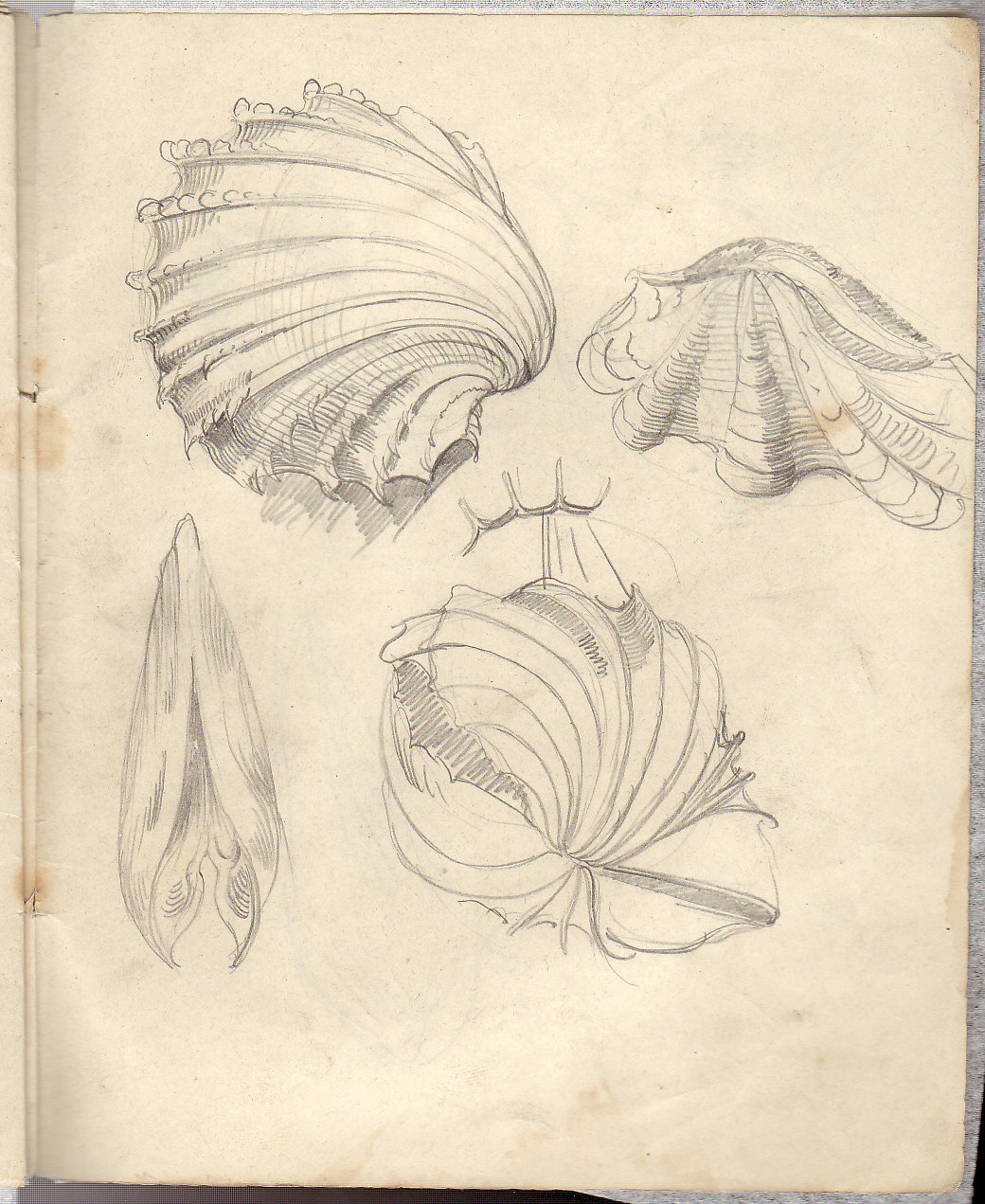
Shells from a sketchbook, undated.

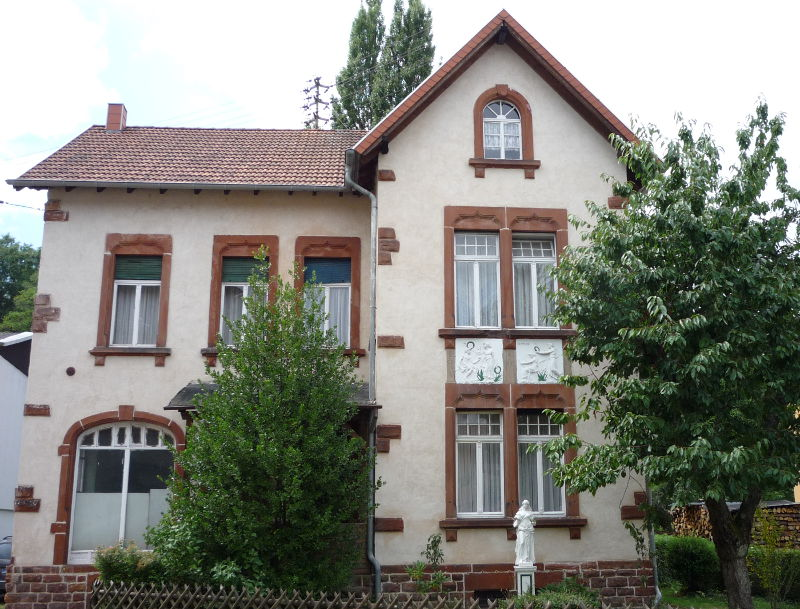
His former dwelling in Mettlach-Keuchingen with a relief created and signed by the artist himself
