= Stals =

Stals is a surname. Notable people with the surname include:

- Chris Stals (born 1934), South African banker
- Juris Štāls (born 1982), Latvian ice hockey player
- Sandra Stals (born 1975), Belgian middle distance runner

== See also ==
- Staal; lists other similar surnames
