= Abraham Staal =

Abraham Jacobsz Staal (1752 – April 5, 1804) was a Dutch Mennonite teacher at Goes (1779), Bolsward (1787) and Leeuwarden (1788) who combined sermons with revolution. He became known in the wider world as "arendsneus" ("eagle nose"). He features in Gerrit Paape's book "De Knorrepot en de Menschenvriend" as the character "minister Langhals".

Staal studied in Amsterdam until 1778; his fellow students were Wijbo Fijnje and François Adriaan van der Kemp. On 8 May 1787, Staal accepted an appointment as a teacher in Bolsward, and also from Dokkum. The Mennonite municipality of Goes, consisting of 14 members, of which the majority had for the last 50 years been in that of Middelburg. Nothing was known of revolutionary activities in Bolsward during the time of the Patriots, although the Mennonites were quite strongly represented in the local voluntary schutterij and were sure to be lent a willing ear by him. In Leeuwarden, Abraham Staal became part of the hard core of political activists. In 1796, he was appointed by the people's representatives to be a raadsheer in the Court of Friesland (1796), together with the journalist Paape. Both had no legal schooling, but were appointed because of their political experience. Within a year Staal and Paape got into difficulties for their fanaticism, especially after a small popular revolt in Kollum. On the advice of a commission, in which Eise Eisinga played a part, Paape was expelled a few months later.

After the coup in January 1798, Staal was put under house arrest in Huis ten Bosch in The Hague, where the prisoners could walk in the garden, but not speak whilst there.
