= Phanolith =

Type of porcelain

Phanolith is a kind of porcelain that combines the characteristics and benefits of jasperware and pâte-sur-pâte. It was developed at Villeroy & Boch in Mettlach, Saarland, Germany, at the end of the nineteenth century. As the creator of the Phanolith, the artist Jean-Baptiste Stahl headed the modeller section at Villeroy & Boch. The Phanolith gained first wide public attention at the World's Fair 1900 in Paris.

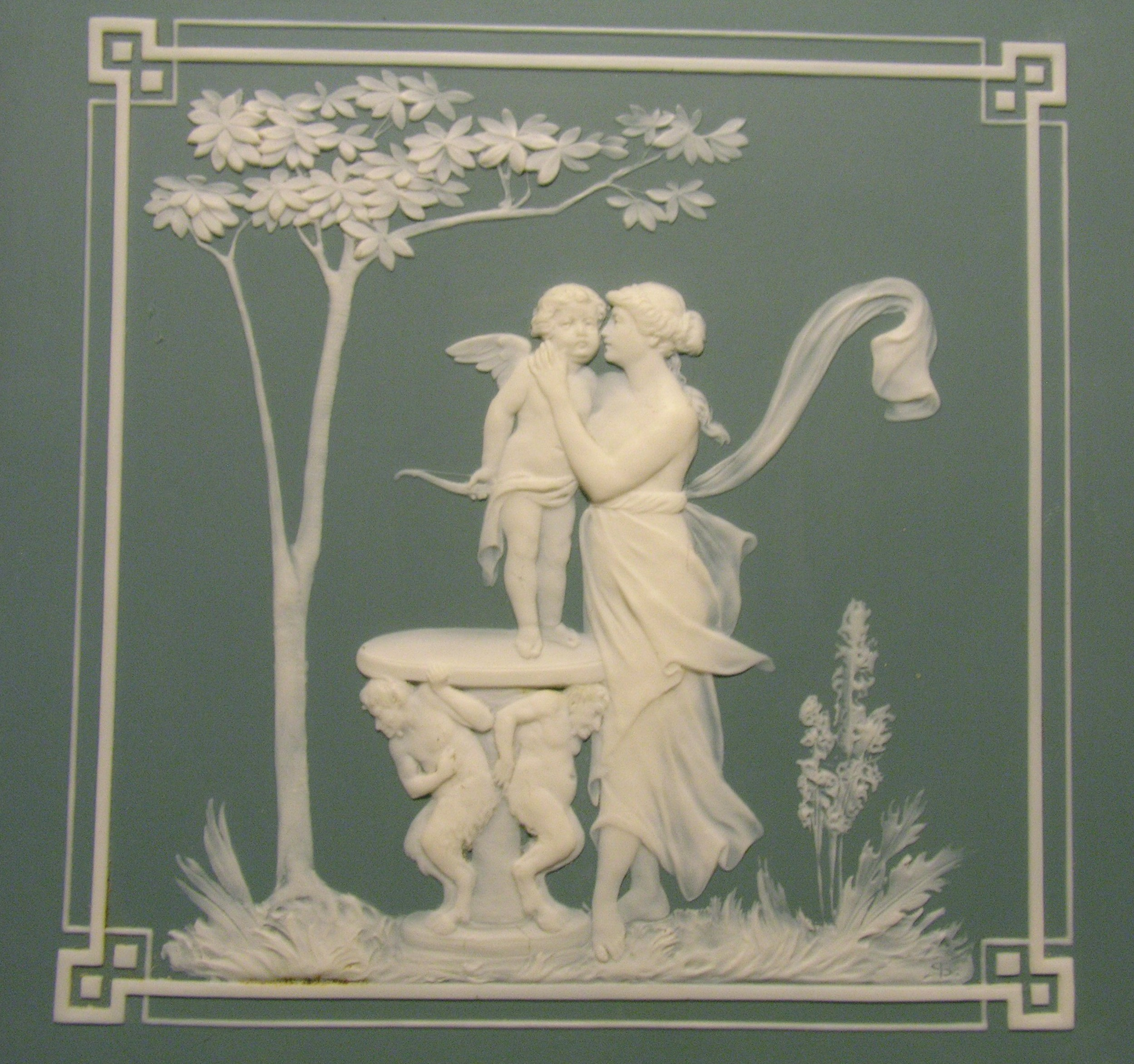
Phanolith plaque at the height of Jean-Baptiste Stahl's work.

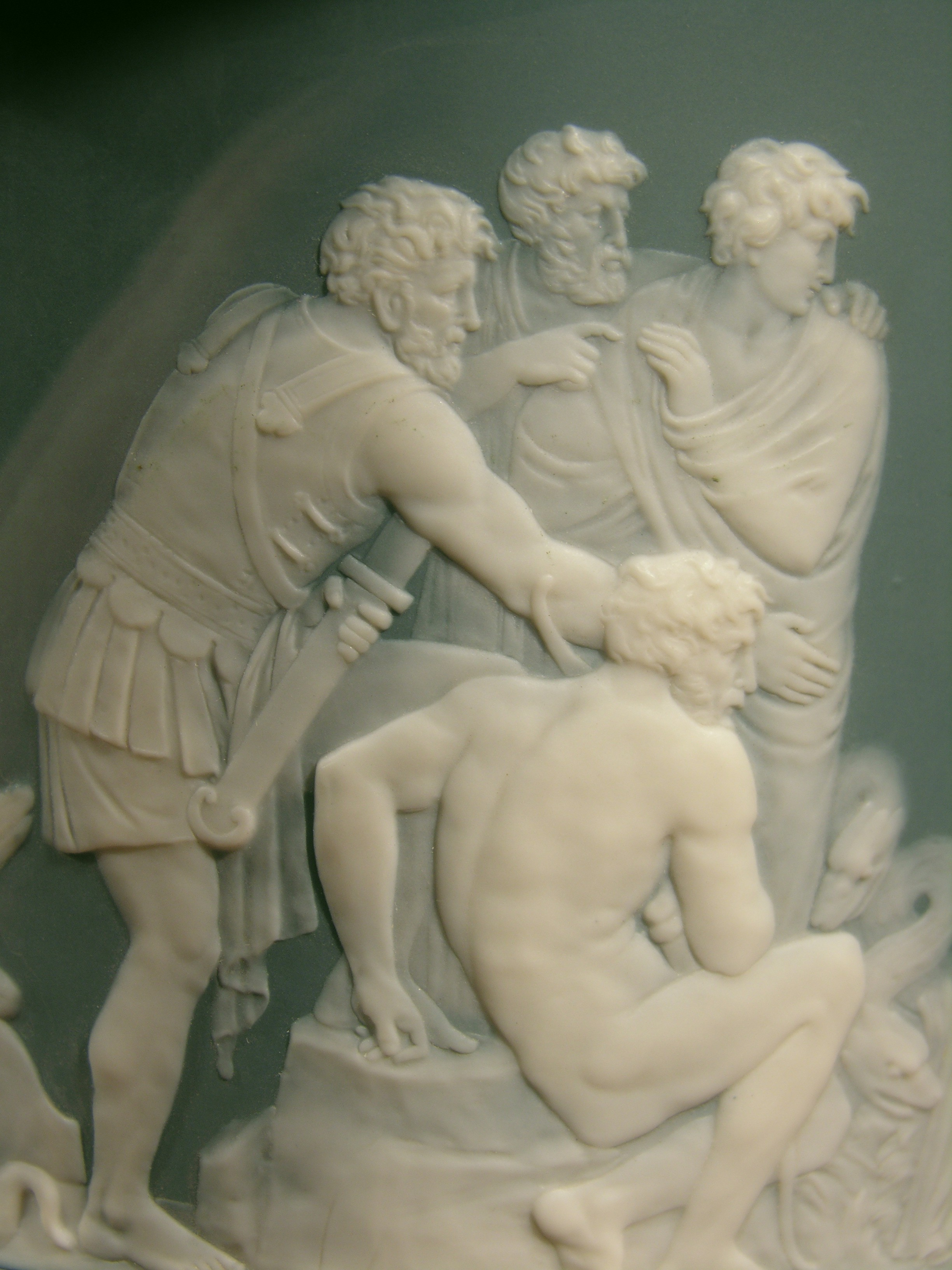
Section from a large cup.
