= Gerrit Paape =

Dutch politician and writer

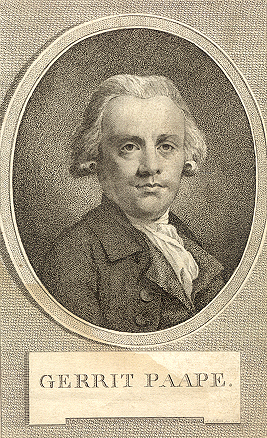
Gerrit Paape.

Gerrit Paape (Delft, 4 February 1752 – The Hague, 7 December 1803) was a Dutch plateelschilder (painter of earthenware and stoneware), poet, journalist, novelist, judge, columnist and (at the end of his career) ministerial civil servant.

== Life ==
Gerrit Paape was born to a poor couple with many children. Because he wanted to draw well, his father had him placed in a local earthenware factory in 1765, where he learned the trade of the plateelschilder. In 1779, he was dismissed. He had in the meantime joined a Delft circle of poets, amateur artists and notables. In 1781, he got a job as a clerk at the Kamer van Charitate (“Chamber of Charity”), the local institution of poor relief. Gradually Paape became a person of influence in Delft. In 1782, he became one of the Patriots.

In 1785, he became a journalist of the local paper the Hollandsche Historische Courant, since 1775 in the hands of Wybo Fijnje. The paper was regarded as one of the most radical in the country. Fijnje frequently had to defend his articles, especially those written by his friend and co-editor. Paape wrote pamphlets and poems and became a theoretician of the Patriots and a historian of the local societies. On 21 August 1787 a revolution took place in the vroedschap (the local government) in Delft, and various regents were deposed. In his account, Gerrit Paape laid emphasis on the opposition being shamed and silenced by the order and peace which characterised these developments.

At the end of September 1787 Paape fled to Amsterdam and two weeks later, wearing a wig and hat, via Antwerp and Brussels, ended up at Dunkirk. On 3 April 1789 he and Wybo Fynje were exiled for life from the four regions (Holland, Zeeland, Friesland and Utrecht) for lèse majesté. Herman Willem Daendels appointed Paape his secretary in Saint-Omer, and under the French general Pichegru, both men arrived at 's-Hertogenbosch on 21 September 1794 . The siege of the city was to last three weeks. Daendels' plans to take matters in his own hands in the Bommelerwaard were at his instigation reported by Paape in a newspaper article, which, however, upset the French.

=== After the revolution ===
After jobs in Delft, Dordrecht and the Hague, he was offered an honourable post in Leeuwarden in September 1796. There he was appointed to the Council of Justice, but without any legal qualifications. Paape resumed his journalistic work, usually under a pseudonym, with the radical Friesche Courant, with a view to acquainting the citizens with the ideas of the revolution. The anti-French revolt of Kollum caused great strain in Friesland, so that Daendels was called in to help. Paape, an anti-Orangist to the very core, squandered his position as an independent by running ahead of judicial procedures and verdicts. Paape was expelled and in May 1797 he left for the Hague, totally disenchanted with the Batavian revolution.

Paape then wrote Vrolijke Caracterschetsen (“Cheerful Profiles”) en "De Knorrepot en de Menschenvriend" (“The Growser and the Humanitarian”), a sharp and brilliant portrait of his former colleague-judge in Leeuwarden, the radical Abraham Staal, who, it is assumed, may have played a prominent part as early as 1787. In 1798, he was appointed a civil servant in the ministry of National Education. At the time of the Coup he renewed his contacts with Pieter Vreede. In his last years Paape was plagued by illnesses that consigned him to his bed. He died of edema at the Hague at the age of 51.

== Works ==
Paape wrote numerous books and plays, mostly romanticised accounts of an exile's life in the southern Netherlands and France, based on real events and facts. Gerrit Paape edited Reize door de Oostenrijkse Nederlanden ("A Journey through the Austrian [i.e. Southern] Netherlands"). The exiles in the castle of Watten (in French Flanders) also figure in his novel De gelukkige emigranten ("The Happy Emigrés"). Paape kept himself occupied by translating the "Explanation of the Rights of Man". In 's-Hertogenbosch, Paape produced the periodical De keezensociëteit (“The Patriot Society”). Like Voltaire, he wrote a satirical novel, Het leven en sterven van een hedendaagsch Aristocraat ("The Life and Death of a Present-day Aristocrat"), in which he very cynically describes how the old nobility ostensibly embrace the revolution, but only to save their own skin and in the end, even without titles and heraldic shields, become even more impudent and power-hungry than before. Beside literary works, he wrote on the exercitiegenootschappen (military societies), bee keeping and plateelschilders (pottery painters). On the first page of his last book, De onverbloemde geschiedenis ("The Plain History") Paape states that he is not sure whether the Patriot movement should make him laugh or cry.

== Literature ==
- Altena, P. & M. Oostindie (ed.). Gerrit Paape, De Bataafsche Republiek. Nijmegen. 1998.
- Fijnje-Luzac, E. Mijn beslommerde Boedel. Brieven in ballingschap 1787–1788.
- Kuiper, J. (2002) Een revolutie ontrafeld. Politiek in Friesland 1795–1798.
- Roosendaal, J. (2003) Bataven! Nederlandse vluchtelingen in Frankrijk 1787–1795.
- Schama, S. (1977) Patriots and Liberators. Revolution in the Netherlands 1780–1830.
