= Stalowa Wola Stadium =

The Stalowa Wola Stadium may refer to:

- MOSiR Stadium (1930s–2016)
- Subcarpathian Football Center (2020–)
