= Johann Friedrich Stahl =

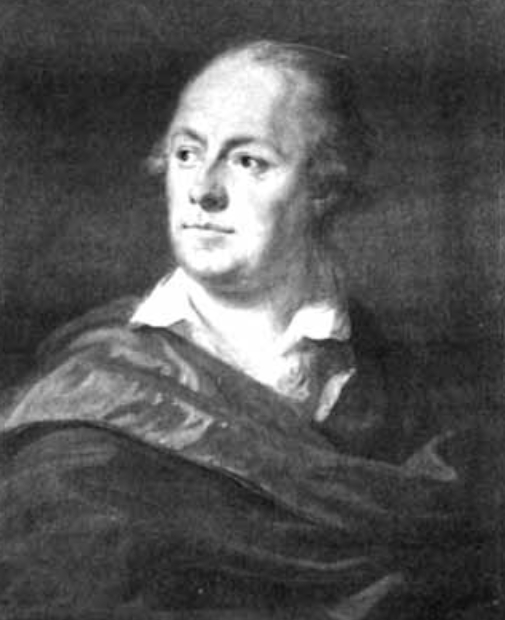
Portrait, 1782

Johann Friedrich Stahl (26 September 1718 in Heimsheim – 28 January 1790 in Stuttgart) was a German mines inspector, cameralist, forester and the author of a dictionary of forestry terms. He founded the first German forestry journal Allgemeinen oeconomischen Forstmagazin which went into 12 volumes from 1763 to 1769.

== Biography ==
Stahl was born in Heimsheim, son of schoolmaster Johann Michael and Sara Agatha Laux. He went to school in Vaihingen and Tübingen before grammar school in Stuttgart and went to study at a monastery in Tübingen in 1738. He studied theology in 1740 and became a vicar in Rudersberg (Württemberg). He was interested in natural history and cameralist matters and took up a position as a tutor for Baron von Göllnitz in Metzingen, resigning from his clergy position. Here he worked with foresters and after the death of Göllnitz in 1751, he became tutor to the Privy Councillor Christoph Heinrich Korn in Stuttgart. In 1753–54, travelled with support from the Württemberg Chamber President Friedrich August von Hardenberg (1700–68) in the Harz Mountains and the Bohemian Forest. In 1755 he became mining councillor and inspector of mines in Württemberg. In 1758 he became revenue councillor and head of forestry for the Dukedom of Württemberg. His official position was Herzoglich Württembergischer Rentkammer-Expeditions-Rat ().

From 1770 he taught natural sciences and forestry at the military school near Stuttgart which became a university in 1775. He then headed the teaching of sciences at the Faculty of Cameral science, Forestry and Commerce.

Stahl published a dictionary of forest sciences beginning in 1772 in which he saw the aim of forest management as being that of producing wood sustainably.
