= Betschdorf =

- Commune
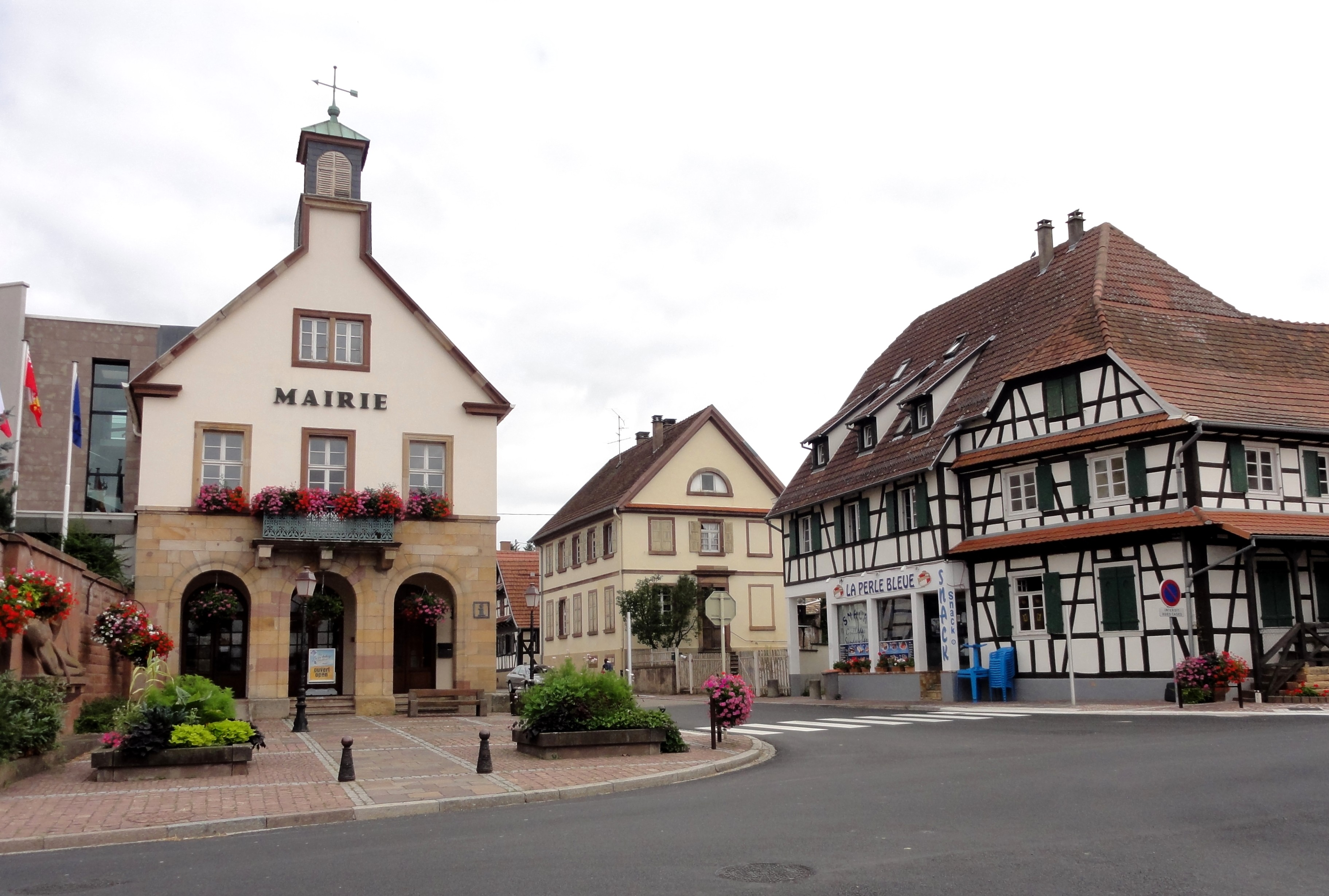
- Town hall

- Coat of arms
- Location of Betschdorf
- Location within France Location within Grand Est
- Coordinates: 48°53′58″N 7°54′24″E
- Country: France
- Region: Grand Est
- Department: Bas-Rhin
- Arrondissement: Haguenau-Wissembourg
- Canton: Wissembourg

Government
  - Mayor (2020–2026): Adrien Weiss
- Area^{1}: 28.11 km^{2} (10.85 sq mi)
- Highest elevation: 210 m (690 ft)
- Lowest elevation: 114 m (374 ft)
- Population (2023): 4,231
  - Density: 150.5/km^{2} (389.8/sq mi)
- Time zone: UTC+01:00 (CET)
  - Summer (DST): UTC+02:00 (CEST)
- INSEE/Postal code: 67339 /67660
- ^{1} French Land Register data, which excludes lakes, ponds, glaciers > 1 km^{2} (0.386 sq mi or 247 acres) and river estuaries.

Betschdorf (French pronunciation: [bɛtʃdɔʁf]) is a commune in the Bas-Rhin department in Grand Est in northeastern France.

It is located about 45 km north-northeast of Strasbourg on the northern edge of the Forêt de Haguenau, the largest undivided forest in France. Betschdorf is a center of craft pottery manufacture, especially salt-glazed stoneware.

== History ==
The vicinity has been inhabited since Neolithic times. In 1912, stelae dedicated to the Roman gods Mars and Diana were discovered in the municipal forest.

A document dated 733 refers to a place called Batenondovilla near modern Betschdorf. The 7th-9th century Traditiones Wizenburgenses, chronicles of the Benedictine monastery of Wissembourg, mention a donation by Helphant of Batanesheim, grandson of Battacho.

Mention of twin villages begins in the early 14th century. A 1363 document is the first to use the names Oberbetschdorf and Niederbetschdorf (Upper and Lower Betschdorf). The two villages formed part of a district called the Hattgau, which became property of the count of Hanau in 1480. His successors, the counts of Hanau-Lichtenberg, retained property rights after the area fell under French control via the 1648 Treaty of Westphalia, and were inherited by the landgrave of Hesse-Darmstadt in 1736. The area remained largely German-speaking and Lutheran under Bourbon rule.

== Pottery industry ==
The development of Betschdorf as a pottery making center dates from the period 1706–1717, when immigrants from the Rhineland began making stoneware in Oberbetschdorf. The French Revolution caused an exodus of potters to Germany, but the First Empire brought a return and a business boom. During this period the potters formed a business district along the Rue de Potiers (Potters' Street).

The two Betschdorfs passed into German hands after the Franco-Prussian War. French markets dried up, and once again the pottery business went into decline. Back in France after World War I, the housewares pottery business ran into stiff competition from high-volume industrial producers. Local potters began a transition to more highly decorated art pottery, still in the city's traditional blue and gray colors. This is their primary market today.

== Consolidation ==
In 1971, following an act of the French Parliament to provide incentives for the merger of communes, the communes of Oberbetschdorf and Niederbetschdorf merged to form the new commune Betschdorf, ending nearly 750 years of separate existence. The following year, the nearby communes of Kuhlendorf, Reimerswiller and Schwabwiller were merged into Betschdorf.

== Population ==
Population data refer to the area corresponding with the commune as of January 2025.

Historical population
Year	Pop.	±% p.a.
1968	2,848	—
1975	3,038	+0.93%
1982	3,371	+1.50%
1990	3,628	+0.92%
1999	3,727	+0.30%
2007	3,971	+0.80%
2012	4,100	+0.64%
2017	4,161	+0.30%
2023	4,231	+0.28%
Source: INSEE

== See also ==
- Communes of the Bas-Rhin department
