= Villeroy & Boch =

German manufacturer of ceramics

Villeroy & Boch AG
- Type: Public (Aktiengesellschaft)
- ISIN: DE0007657231
- Industry: Ceramic goods
- Founded: Lorraine, Holy Roman Empire (1748)
- Founder: François Boch and Nicolas Villeroy
- Headquarters: Mettlach, Germany
- Key people: Peter Domma; Patrick Grundke; Esther Jehle; Georg Lörz; Markus Warncke; Andreas Schmid (chairman of the supervisory board)
- Products: Tableware, bathroom ceramics
- Revenue: €1.447 billion (2025)
- Operating income: €58.6 million (2025)
- Net income: €14.7 million (2025)
- Number of employees: 11,783 (2025)
- Divisions: Dining & Lifestyle, Bathroom & Wellness
- Website: www.villeroyboch-group.com www.villeroy-boch.com

Villeroy & Boch (German: [ˌvɪlərɔɪ.ʔʊntˈbɔx], French pronunciation: [vilʁwa e bɔk]), abbreviated V&B (also VB), is a German manufacturer of ceramic goods, with the company headquarters located in Mettlach, Saarland. The company, whose origins date back to 1748, is named after its two founders, François Boch and Nicolas Villeroy. There are 15 production sites in Europe and Asia, and the company's products are sold in around 140 countries.

== History ==
Headquarters Villeroy & Boch AG Old Abbey Mettlach

=== Beginnings ===
The company began in 1748, when François Boch, an iron founder by trade, started manufacturing ceramic goods, in particular tableware, with his three sons in the tiny Lorraine village of Deutsch-Oth (Audun le Tiche). Thanks to high demand for these goods the company was able to expand: in 1766 Boch was licensed to build a ceramics kilnworks nearby at Septfontaines, Luxembourg, where it operated a porcelain factory and serial production of ceramics began under the name Jean-François Boch et Frères. In 1770 the Brindille decor with its gadrooned form was created. It has since been sold with interruptions, since the 20th century under the name "Alt Luxemburg" or "Vieux Luxembourg".

In 1785 Nicolas Villeroy became sole owner of the faience manufactory at Wallerfangen. In 1812 Jean-François Boch began construction of kilns at the nearby town of Mettlach, Saarland. In 1824 Boch commenced transfer printing on porcelain from engraved copper plates.

=== Merger and expansion ===
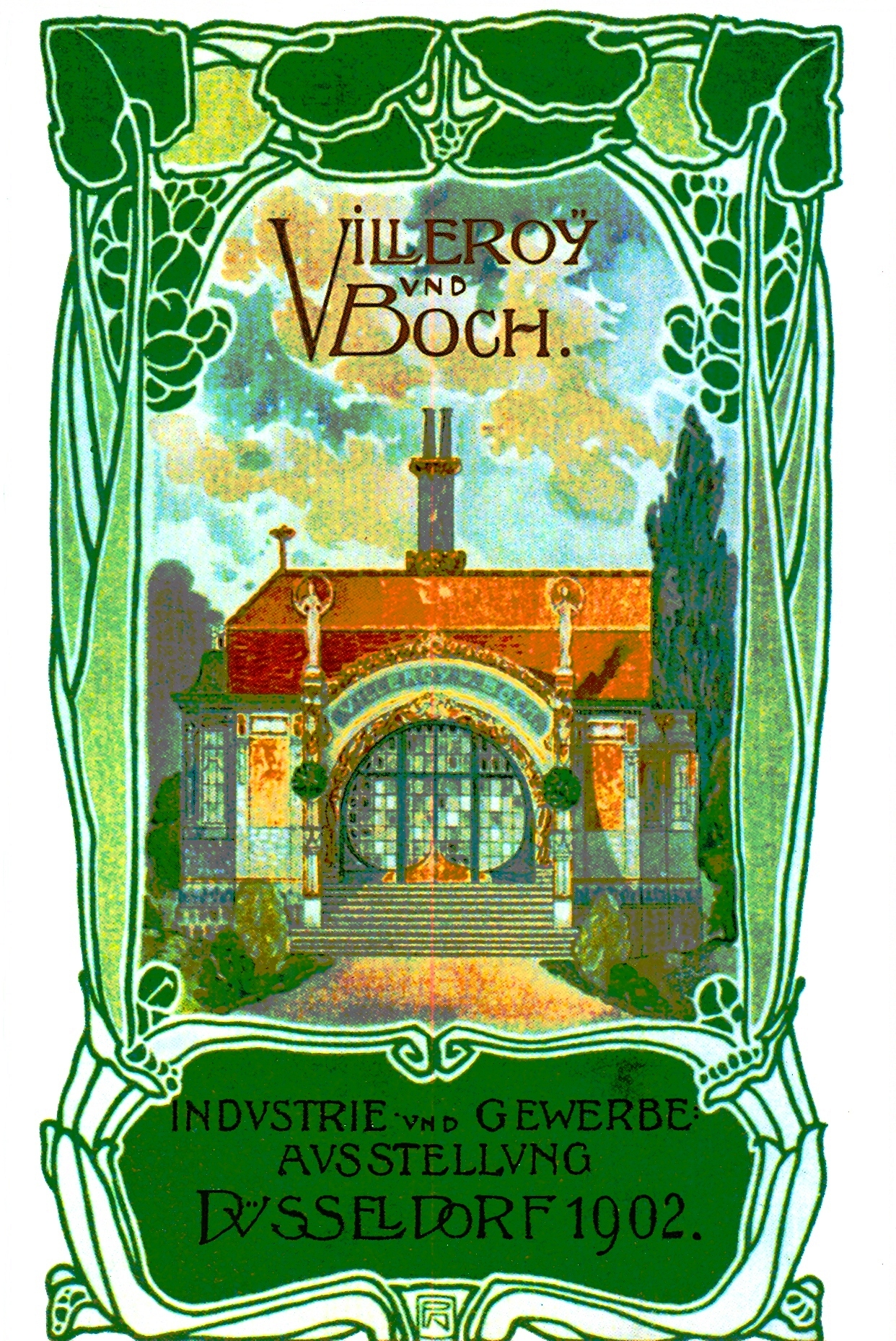
Poster for the 1902 industrial and trade exhibition in Düsseldorf

On 14 April 1836, the Jean François Boch company merged with that of the competitor, Nicolas Villeroy, and became Villeroy & Boch, (V&B, also simply 'VB'). In 1843 Villeroy & Boch opened their first joint factory, the Cristallerie in Wadgassen (Saarland). Large-scale production in Wadgassen ended in 1986, and manufacture of the Treveris crystal glass series ceased entirely in the early 1990s. Crystal glass was still produced for demonstration purposes until 2010. Since October 2012 a factory outlet centre has been located on the factory grounds.

By the early 1840s Villeroy & Boch was already among the leading manufacturers of faience. A contemporary report on the General German Trade Exhibition in Berlin in 1844 described the company's printed and painted faience wares as being among the best on show.

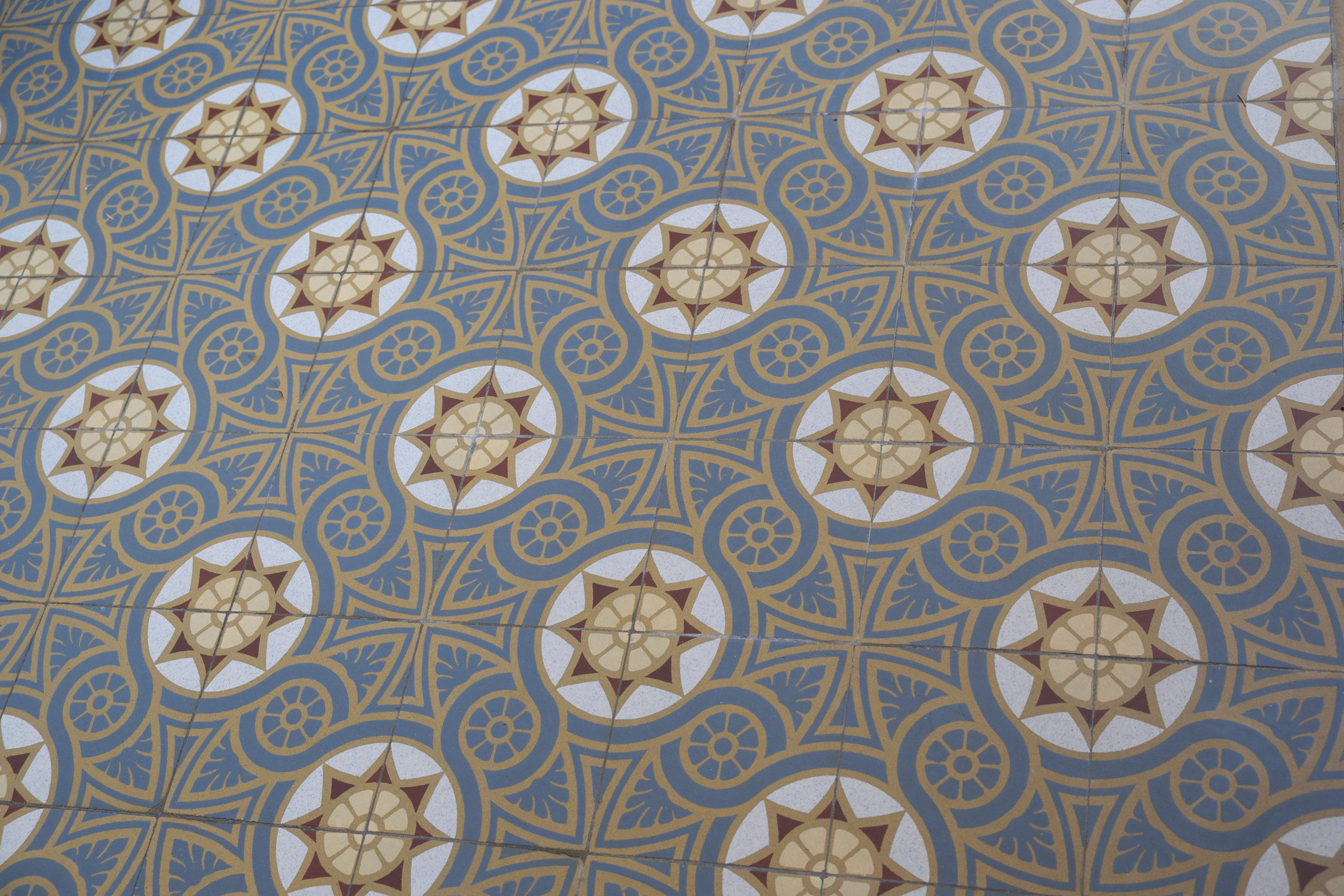
Ornamental floor of Mettlacher Platten in St. Michael's church in Zwiefaltendorf

The floor tiles with inlaid patterns known as Mettlacher Platten (Mettlach tiles), which took their name from their place of production, were described by a contemporary technical encyclopedia as dry-pressed tiles made of two layers of clay, coloured throughout the material rather than only on the surface, with the pattern formed in the finer upper layer under hydraulic pressure using stencils. The Mettlach tiles were so successful on the market that they were imitated by the Wienerberger Ziegelfabriks- und Baugesellschaft.

In 1869, Villeroy & Boch opened the first manufactory for architectural tiles. From 1883 until its sale in 1912, the Schramberger Majolika-Fabrik in Schramberg in the Black Forest also belonged to Villeroy & Boch as a subsidiary.

Among its innovations in Mettlach at the end of the nineteenth century was Phanolith, a kind of semi-transparent porcelain that combines the characteristics and benefits of jasperware and pâte-sur-pâte. The creator of the Phanolith was the ceramics artist Jean-Baptiste Stahl, who headed the modelling section of Villeroy & Boch. Phanolith gained first wide public attention at the Paris Exposition Universelle (1900).

=== Early 20th century ===
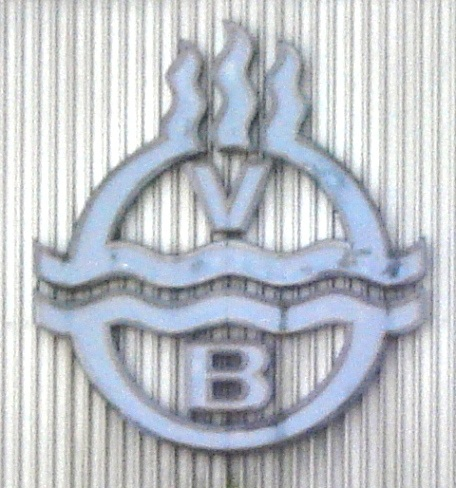
Former Villeroy & Boch logo from the 1960s

After the First World War, supplying the German market from the separated Saar territory was difficult, and Villeroy & Boch acquired factories near Bonn and near Breslau in 1920. The Bonn factory manufactured utility ceramics and decorative wares and was retooled for sanitary ware production from 1926. However, the acquired facilities of the Mehlem earthenware factory were outdated and offered neither a railway connection nor room for expansion, so the factory was shut down in 1931.

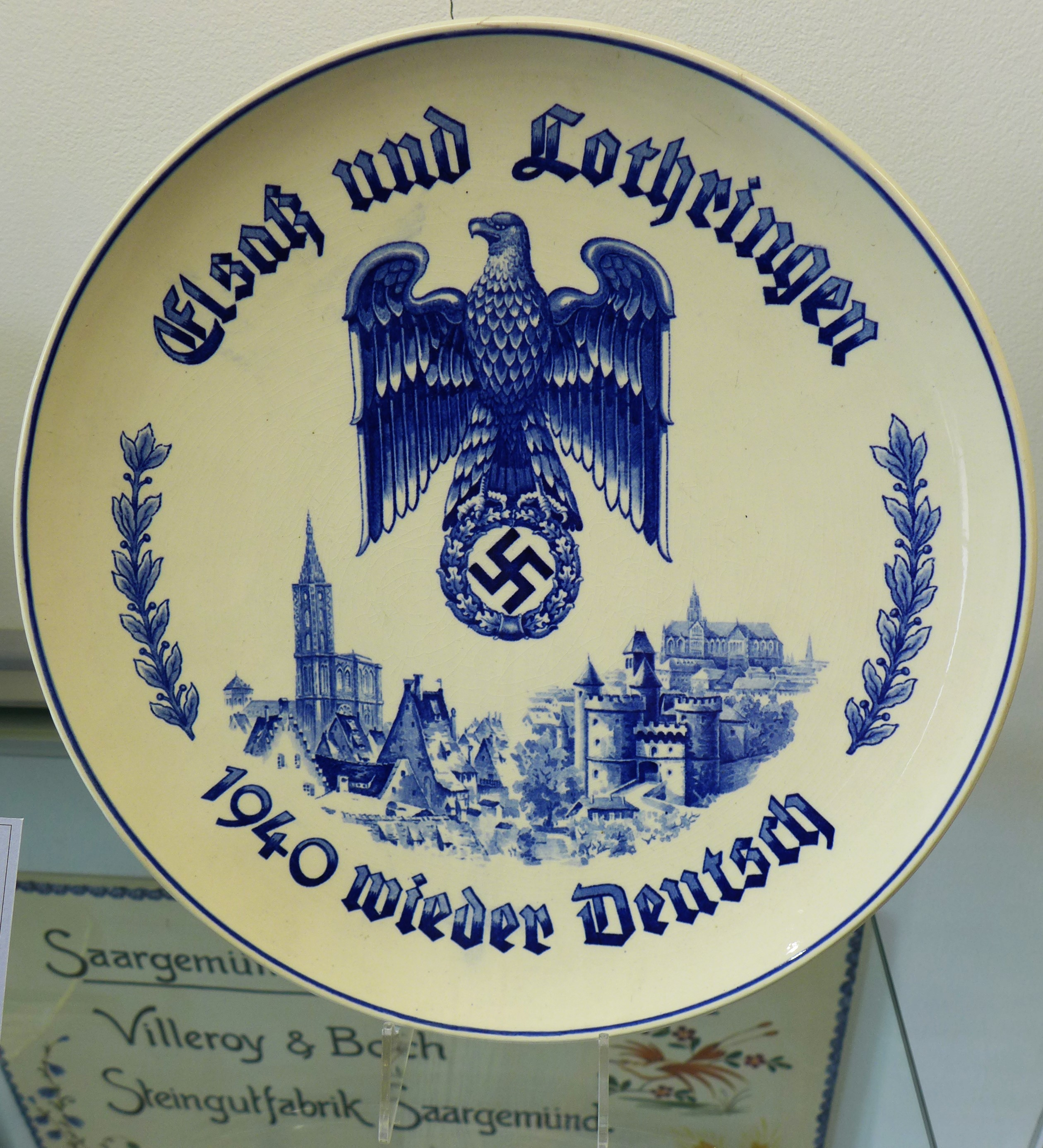
Villeroy & Boch, Sarreguemines: decorative plate celebrating the annexation of Alsace and Lorraine by Nazi Germany after the Battle of France, showing the Reich eagle with swastika in an oak wreath above Strasbourg Cathedral (left) and Metz Cathedral with the Porte des Allemands (right), flanked by laurel branches as a symbol of victory

With the de facto annexation of Alsace-Lorraine after the Battle of France in 1940, the Sarreguemines faience factory was confiscated as "enemy property" by Gauleiter Josef Bürckel, and Luitwin von Boch was appointed its administrator in October 1940. Production resumed in January 1941, and on 6 July 1942 Villeroy & Boch bought the Sarreguemines factory for around two million Reichsmarks. After the liberation of Sarreguemines by the US Army in December 1944, the former factory director Édouard Cazal resumed the management of the factory, and the town of Sarreguemines bought the land and factory back from Villeroy & Boch at the same price.

=== Post-war period and 2000s ===
In 1971 Villeroy & Boch presented the Kugel ("sphere") dinner service designed by Helen von Boch at the Frankfurt trade fair. The sphere-shaped object contained a complete 19-piece dinner service for four people, including a lidded tureen and various bowls.

Since 1990 the company has been listed on the German stock market, ticker symbol VIB3 although the voting capital is still in the hands of the family.

The Tiles division became a separate company (V&B Fliesen GmbH) in 2006. In 2007 the Villeroy & Boch AG sold 51% of the V&B Fliesen GmbH to the (Eczacıbaşı Holding). Since then there has been only a 2.29% holding in the share capital of V&B Fliesen GmbH.

In 2009 the factory in Lübeck-Dänischburg was closed. The company's Luxembourg factory was closed down in 2010.

=== Corporate development since 2010 ===
Between 2010 and 2012 Villeroy & Boch's revenue remained largely stable, while its operating result improved. In 2010 the European Commission uncovered a cartel of 17 bathroom fittings companies, which together had to pay fines totalling €622 million. Villeroy & Boch's fine amounted to €71.5 million. In 2017 the European Court of Justice upheld the ruling.

In 2012 the workforce was reduced in the course of structural measures, including the sale of the sanitary ware factory in Saltillo (Mexico). The company was listed in the SDAX from 20 November 2009 to 18 June 2010 and was readmitted to the index on 27 November 2013, before leaving it again on 21 September 2015.

The Villeroy & Boch Group increased its consolidated revenue by 2% to €853.1 million in the 2018 financial year. The Bathroom and Wellness Division of the company increased its revenue by 4.7% to €584.3 million. The Tableware Division generated a revenue volume of €266.2 million, down 4.4% on the previous year.

In 2022 the cooking studio La Cuisine was opened at the headquarters in Mettlach. On 1 January 2023 the management board was expanded to include Esther Jehle and Peter Domma. In 2023 the furniture factory in Mondsee (Austria) was sold. With effect from 1 January 2024 the supervisory board appointed Gabi Schupp as chief executive officer, succeeding Frank Göring.

According to media reports of January 2020, Villeroy & Boch had already examined a takeover of the sanitary ware manufacturer Ideal Standard at that time. In September 2023, it was announced Villeroy & Boch had acquired the Brussels-headquartered plumbing fixture company, Ideal Standard Group for €600 million. The acquisition of all operating companies of the Ideal Standard Group was completed in early 2024, making Villeroy & Boch one of the largest manufacturers of bathroom products in Europe.

In 2025 Villeroy & Boch sold the brands Gustavsberg and Vatette to the Oras Group.

== Corporate divisions ==
The company operates in two divisions: Dining & Lifestyle (formerly Tableware) and Bathroom & Wellness. In the Bathroom & Wellness division, the company's two core brands, Villeroy & Boch and Ideal Standard, cover different market segments: Villeroy & Boch is geared more towards private customers in the higher-priced segment, Ideal Standard towards construction projects. Villeroy & Boch has continued to base its broadest market in Germany.

The Dining & Lifestyle division mainly includes tableware as well as complementary products such as gift articles, glassware, cutlery and home accessories.

In addition, part of the range is aimed at commercial customers, in particular the hotel and catering industry.

== Villeroy & Boch World ==
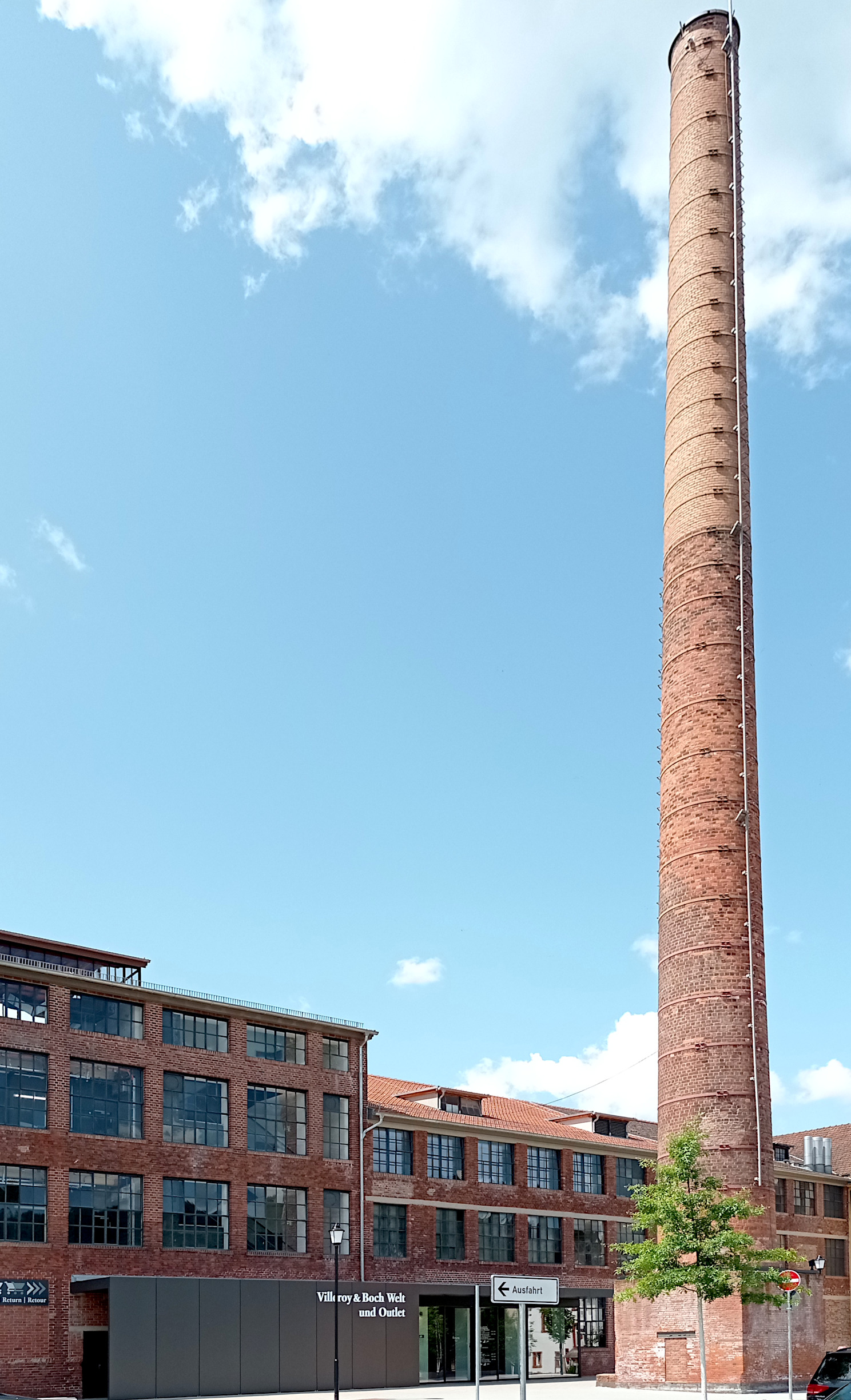
Villeroy & Boch Welt and outlet in a former factory building

The Villeroy & Boch World at the company headquarters is a publicly accessible exhibition facility in the Old Abbey in Mettlach, which includes, among other things, a ceramics museum showing historical exhibits and manufacturing processes since the company's founding.

It emerged from the earlier ceramics museum, which was redesigned as part of a remodelling of the grounds behind the Old Abbey. Parts of the site were altered and replaced, historical halls were renovated and the entrance area was relocated. Since then, the facility has been connected to an outlet centre and forms part of a publicly accessible area.

The exhibits include the manufacture of ceramic products, the company's history and developments in design and bathroom culture. The so-called "historic dairy shop", which was run as a museum café before the exhibition was rebuilt and redesigned, is decorated with 15,000 hand-painted tiles.

In 2024 a new outlet was opened on the site, located in a former production hall with a sales area of around 900 square metres. In 2025 the company also opened a showroom for the Bathroom and Wellness division covering around 560 square metres, where products of the Villeroy & Boch and Ideal Standard brands are presented and consultation and bathroom planning services are offered.

== Buildings associated with the company ==
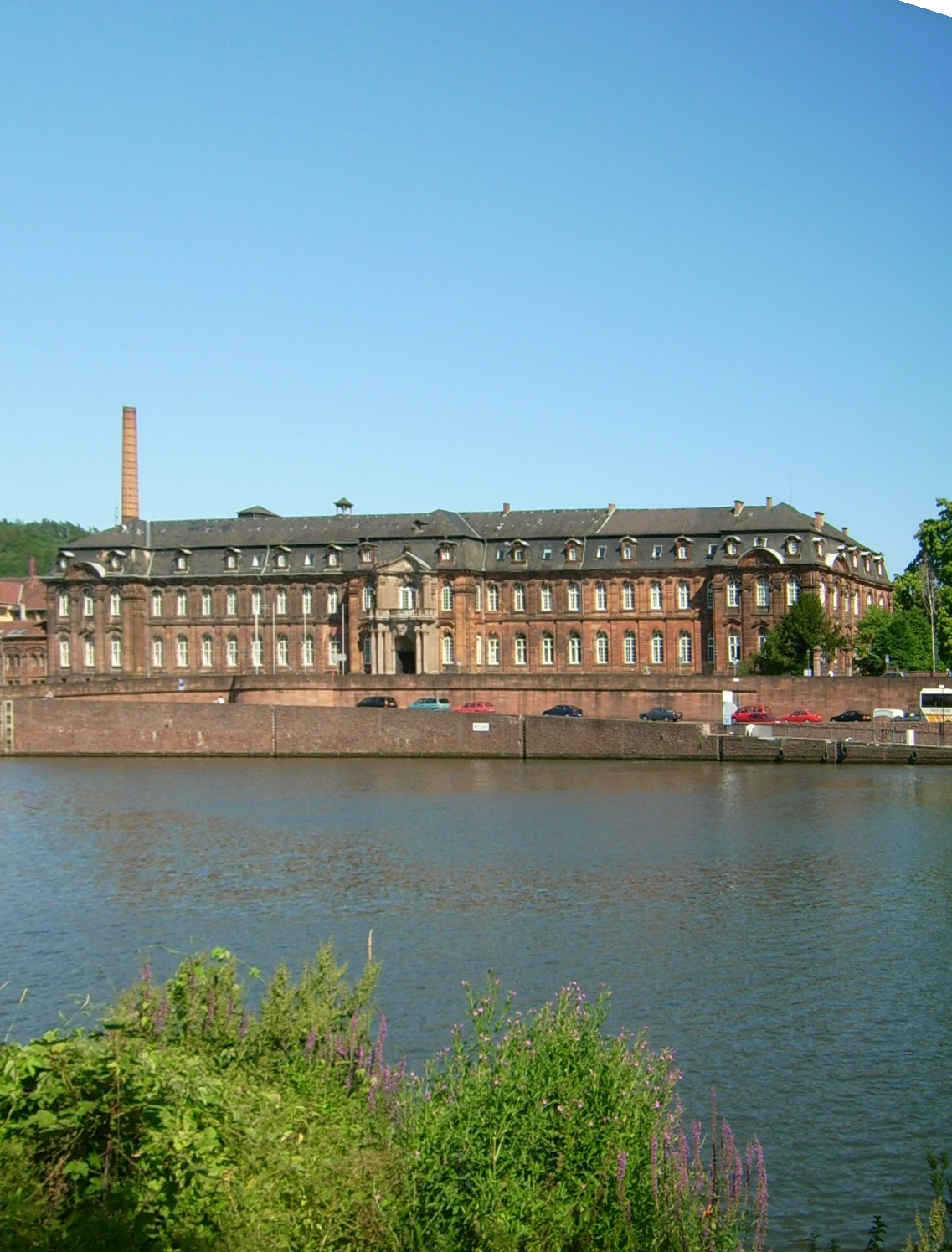
Group headquarters (in the former Mettlach Abbey)

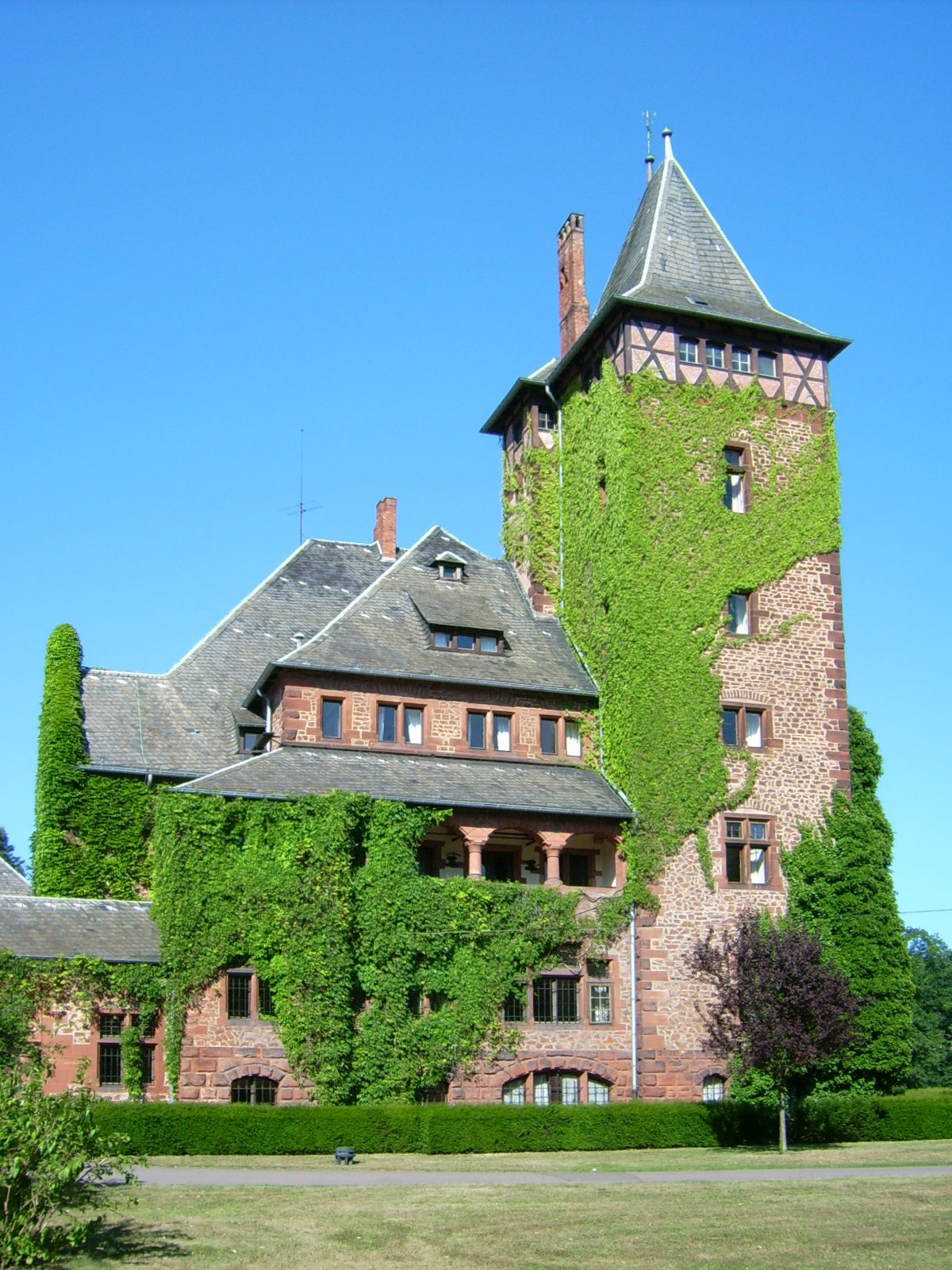
Guest house Schloss Saareck

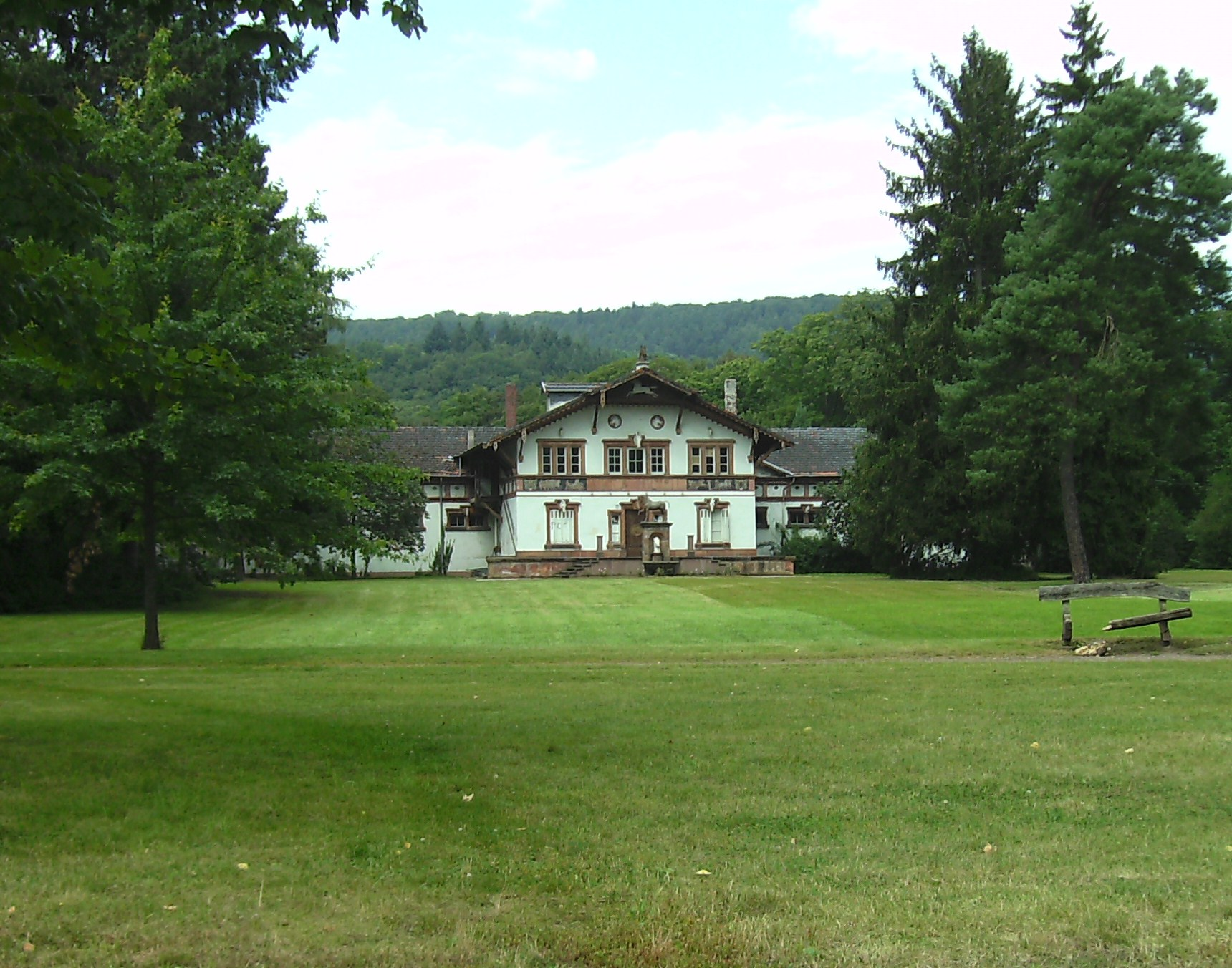
Stud farm on the Saareck estate, built by Eugen von Boch in 1856

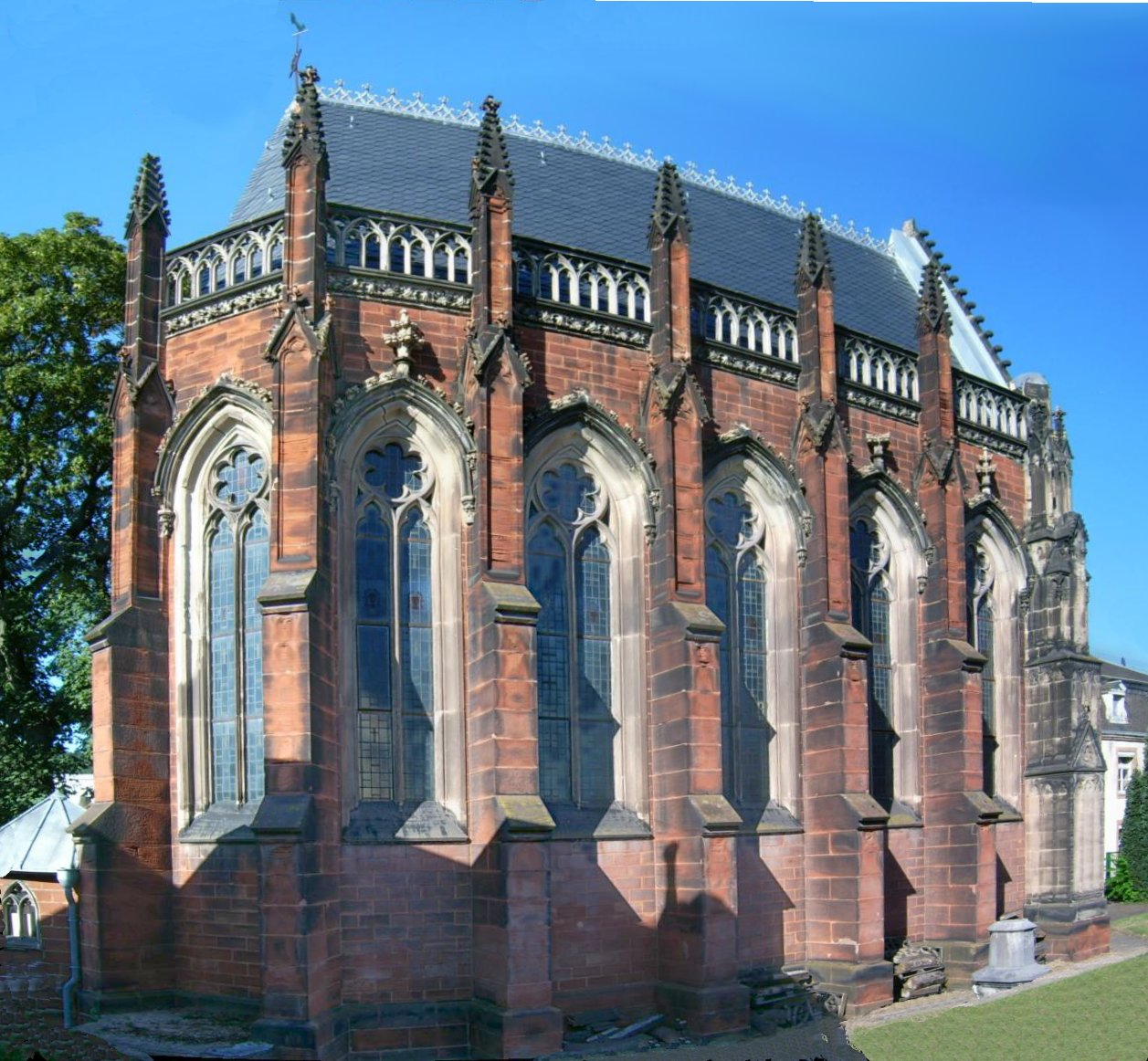
St. Joseph's chapel (originally located in Wallerfangen; Eugen von Boch had it dismantled there in 1879 and re-erected in Mettlach above the von Boch family crypt in 1882)

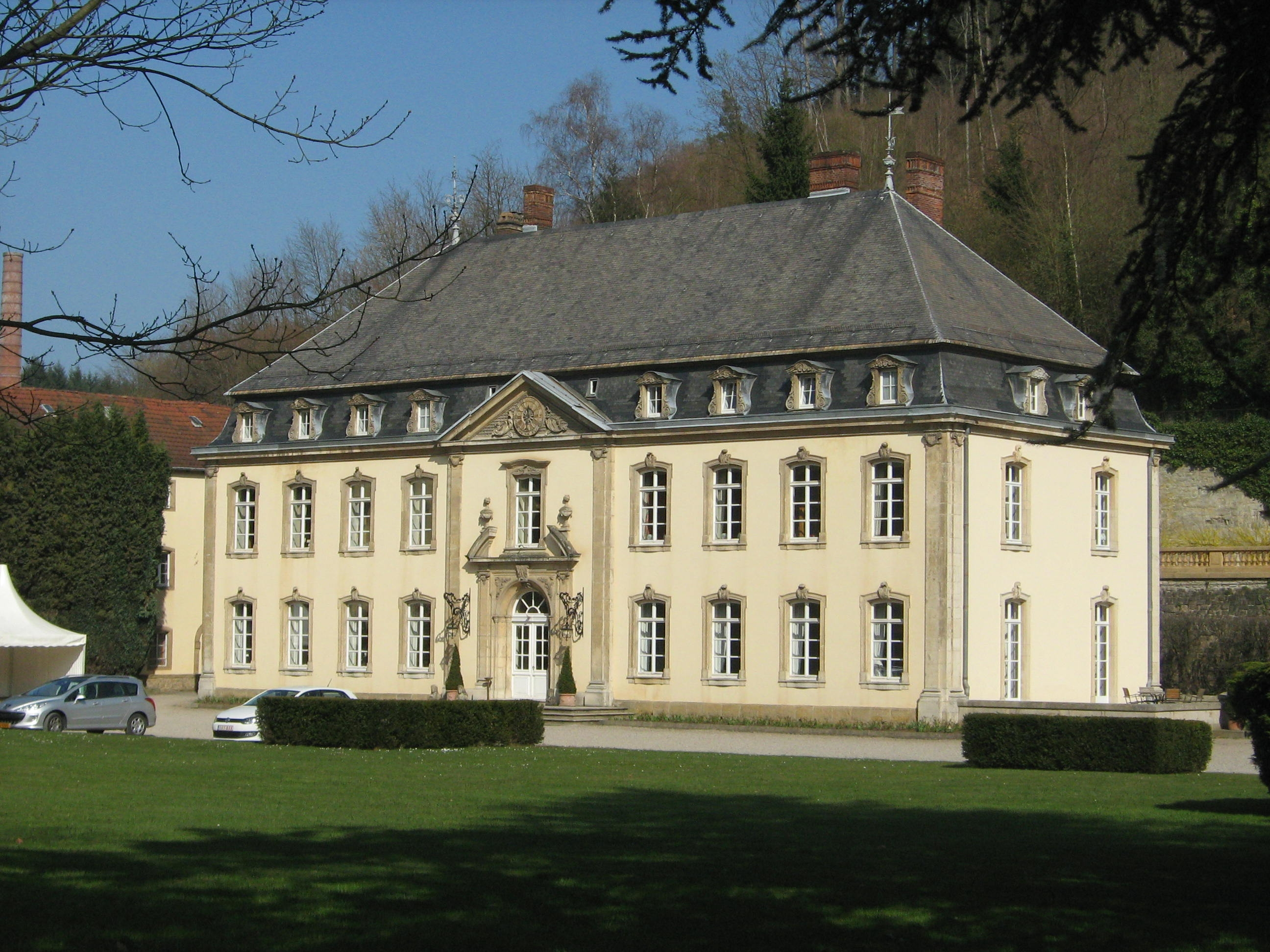
Château de Septfontaines, Luxembourg

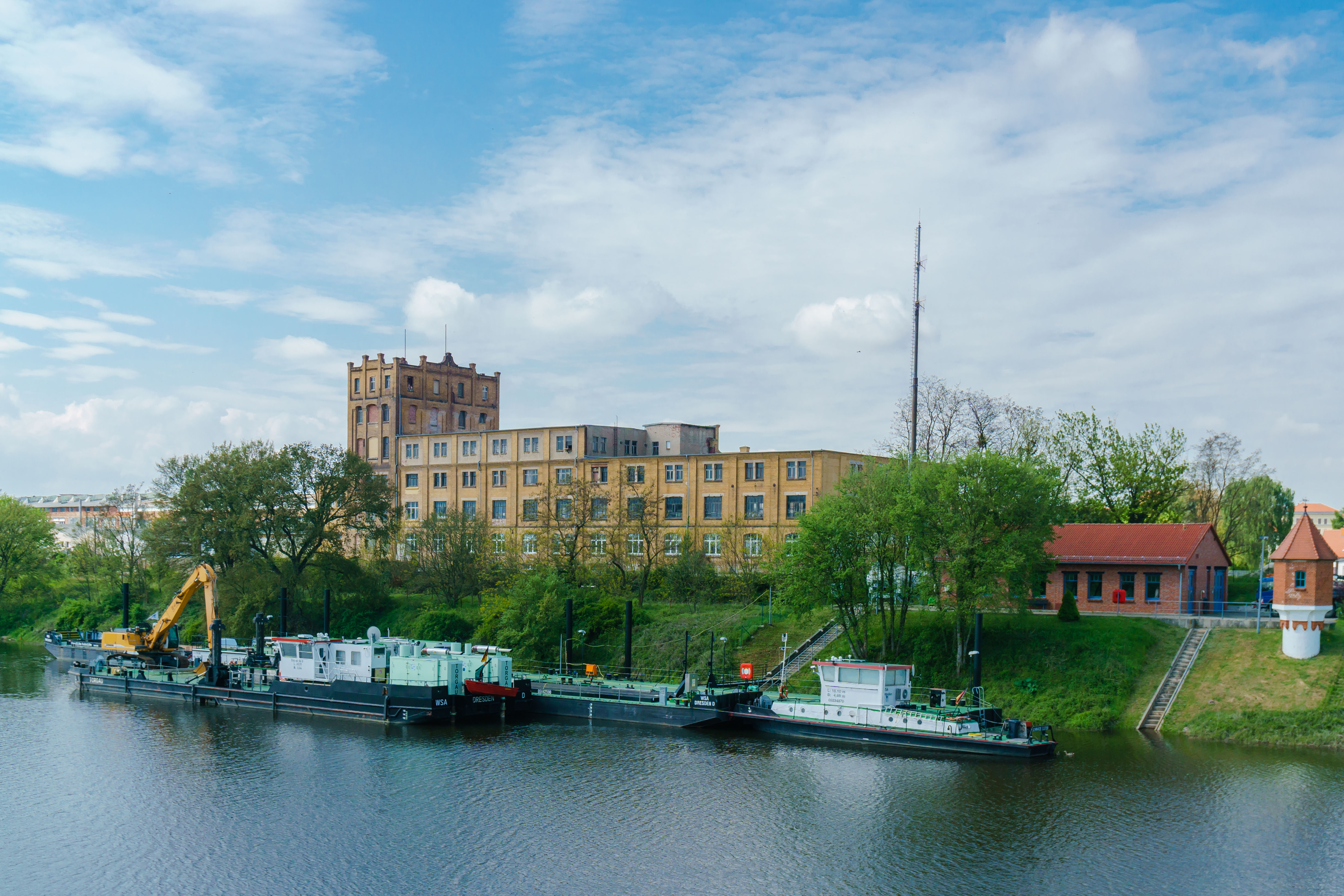
Earthenware factory in Torgau

== Miscellaneous ==
For winning the 1989 European women's football championship, each player of the German team received a 41-piece Mariposa coffee service from the German Football Association (DFB) as a bonus.

== Literature ==
- Zobeltitz, Hanns von (October 1898). "Villeroy & Boch". Velhagen und Klasings Monatshefte (in German). 13 (1898/99) (2): 193–207.
- Villeroy & Boch – Ausgeführte Arbeiten mit Erzeugnissen der Werke Mettlach, Merzig, Dresden, Dänischburg, Breslau Deutsch-Lissa und Bonn. Mappe Nr. 5893 (in German). Dresden. 1929.
- Villeroy & Boch – Tradition, Qualität, Fortschritt (in German). Paris: Draeger Frères. 1960.
- Thomas, Thérèse (1974). Die Rollen der beiden Familien Boch und Villeroy im 18. und 19. Jahrhundert. Die Entstehung des Unternehmens Villeroy & Boch (Dissertation) (in German). Saarbrücken: Saarbrücker Druckerei & Verlag.
- Jacobs, Werner; Krajewski, Hans (1976). Wohnen mit Keramik (in German). Cologne: R. Müller. ISBN 3-481-14201-3.
- Thomas, Thérèse, ed. (1976). Villeroy & Boch – Keramik vom Barock bis zur Neuen Sachlichkeit (Exhibition catalogue) (in German). Bonn.
- Thomas, Thérèse (1977). Villeroy & Boch 1748–1930. Keramik aus der Produktion zweier Jahrhunderte (Exhibition catalogue, Rijksmuseum Amsterdam) (in German). Villeroy & Boch.
- Gorges, Karl-Heinz (1989). Der christlich geführte Industriebetrieb im 19. Jahrhundert und das Modell Villeroy & Boch (Dissertation). Zeitschrift für Unternehmensgeschichte; supplement 60 (in German). Stuttgart: Steiner. ISBN 3-515-05332-8.
- Reiter, H. J. (1992). Die Handelsgesellschaft Villeroy & Boch. Von der Gründung 1836 bis zum Jahr 1878. Rechtshistorische Reihe; 96 (in German). Frankfurt: Lang. ISBN 3-631-44514-8.
- Knorr, Jörg; Schneider, Ester, eds. (1992). Villeroy & Boch Dresden – Zur Geschichte der Steingutfabrik von 1856 bis 1945 (Exhibition catalogue) (in German). Merzig: Merziger Druckerei & Verlag.
- Buddensieg, Andrea (1995). Künstlerentwurf und Firmenprodukt. Zur Geschichte der Gebrauchskeramik von Villeroy & Boch in Mettlach und Dresden zwischen 1900 und 1940 (Dissertation, University of Bonn) (in German). Weimar: VDG. ISBN 3-929742-39-X.
- The House of Villeroy & Boch. Eine Philosophie und ihr Ambiente (in German). Mettlach: Villeroy & Boch. 1996.
- Desens, Rainer (1998). Villeroy & Boch. Ein Vierteljahrtausend europäische Industriegeschichte 1748–1998 (in German). Mettlach: Villeroy & Boch.
- Klemm, Werner; Eggers, H. D. (2010) [2004]. Probatum Est! Altbewährte Rezepturen aus dem Fremersdorfer Schloss (in German) (2nd ed.). Merzig: Merziger Druckerei und Verlag. ISBN 3-923754-96-5.
- Kirsner, Gary (2005). The Mettlach Book – das Mettlach Buch. Illustrated Catalog. Coral Springs: Glentiques. ISBN 978-1-889591-01-8.
- Linsmayer, Ludwig (2013). Archive im Saarland. Institutionen, Adressen, Bestände (in German). Saarbrücken: Saarländische Druckerei und Verlag. pp. 126–129. ISBN 978-3-9811672-9-0.

== Film ==
- Deutsche Dynastien – Die Villeroys & Bochs. Documentary, Germany, 2015, 43:47 min., written and directed by Caroline Haertel, production: neue artfilm, WDR, Saarländischer Rundfunk, series: Deutsche Dynastien, first broadcast: 11 May 2015 on Das Erste.
