= Stal Stalowa Wola (ice hockey) =

Polish ice hockey club

- City: Stalowa Wola, PRL
- Founded: 1951
- Operated: 1951–1960

Stal Stalowa Wola was a Polish ice hockey club founded in 1951 in Stalowa Wola.

== History ==
The section was established in December 1951. In the 1950s, the team took part in the games of the Rzeszów district league. At the beginning of February 1954, Stal won the competition. In 1955, Stal defended the championship in the district, defeating Sparta Rzeszów 5–1 (2–0, 1–0, 2–1) in the decisive match. In 1960, the Stal hockey team ceased its activity.
