= Stal Stalowa Wola (basketball) =

Polish basketball team

- League: Third basketball league
- Arena: Stadion MOSiR
- Location: Stalowa Wola, Poland
- Head coach: Bogdan Pamuła
- Website: http://www.stalstw.pl/

Stal Stalowa Wola is a Polish basketball team competing in the third basketball league, based in Stalowa Wola. The team have played in the Polish Basketball League.

== History ==
Stal Stalowa Wola played in the Polish Basketball League in the 1987/1988 season, from the 1989/1990 season to the 1997/1998 season, and in the 2009/2010 season. The greatest successes of basketball players are twice the fifth place in the 1990/1991 and 1994/1995 seasons. In 2010, the club withdrew from the Polish Basketball League due to the lack of funds (in order to start in PBL, the club had to have a budget of PLN 2 million, which was lacking in Stal).

== Season by season ==
Season	Tier	League	Pos.	Source
2021–22	4	III liga		

== Notable players ==
Note: Flags indicate national team eligibility at FIBA-sanctioned events. Players may hold other non-FIBA nationalities not displayed.

Criteria

To appear in this section a player must have either:

- Set a club record or won an individual award while at the club
- Played at least one official international match for their national team at any time
- Played at least one official NBA match at any time.

- (Poland) Roman Prawica
