= Franciszek Smuda =

Polish football manager and player (1948–2024)

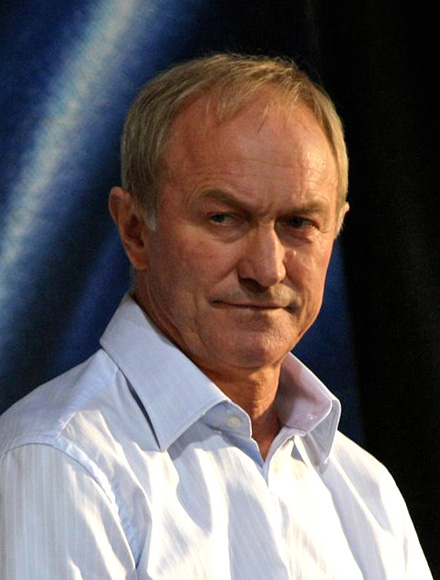
- Smuda in 2013

Personal information
- Date of birth: 22 June 1948
- Place of birth: Lubomia, Poland
- Date of death: 18 August 2024 (aged 76)
- Place of death: Kraków, Poland
- Position: Defender

Youth career
- 1962–1967: Unia Racibórz

Senior career*
Years	Team	Apps	(Gls)
1967–1969	Odra Wodzisław Śląski		
1970	Ruch Chorzów		
1970–1971	Stal Mielec		
1971–1974	Piast Gliwice		
1975	Vistula Garfield		
1975	Hartford Bicentennials	20	(3)
1975–1977	Legia Warsaw	33	(0)
1978	Los Angeles Aztecs	10	(0)
1978	Oakland Stompers	13	(0)
1978	San Jose Earthquakes	2	(0)
1979–1982	SpVgg Fürth	17	(1)
1982	VfR Coburg		

Managerial career
- 1983: VfR Coburg
- 1984–1987: ASV Forth
- 1988: FC Herzogenaurach
- 1989: Altay
- 1992: Konyaspor
- 1993: FV Wendelstein
- 1993–1995: Stal Mielec
- 1995–1998: Widzew Łódź
- 1998–1999: Wisła Kraków
- 1999–2001: Legia Warsaw
- 2001–2002: Wisła Kraków
- 2002: Widzew Łódź
- 2003: Piotrcovia Piotrków Trybunalski
- 2003: Widzew Łódź
- 2004: Widzew Łódź
- 2004: Omonia
- 2004–2005: Odra Wodzisław Śląski
- 2005–2006: Zagłębie Lubin
- 2006–2009: Lech Poznań
- 2009: Zagłębie Lubin
- 2009–2012: Poland
- 2013: Jahn Regensburg
- 2013–2015: Wisła Kraków
- 2016–2017: Górnik Łęczna
- 2017–2018: Widzew Łódź
- 2018–2019: Górnik Łęczna
- 2021–2022: Wieczysta Kraków
- * Club domestic league appearances and goals

Franciszek Smuda (Polish pronunciation: [fraɲˈt͡ɕiʂɛk ˈsmuda]; 22 June 1948 – 18 August 2024) was a Polish football player and manager.

As a player, he spent his career playing for clubs in Poland, the United States and Germany. In 1983, he turned to coaching, becoming the manager of Widzew Łódź, Wisła Kraków, Legia Warsaw and Lech Poznań, among others. He has won three Polish Ekstraklasa titles. From 2009 he was the manager of the Poland national team, but resigned on 16 June 2012, following their elimination from Euro 2012.

== Early life ==
Smuda was born in Lubomia, Wodzisław County, Poland, as a son of Gerard, a railway worker, and Marta.

== Playing career ==
As a player, Smuda played as a defender. He began his career at Unia Racibórz and later played for Odra Wodzisław Śląski. He got his debut in the Ekstraklasa playing for Stal Mielec during the 1970–71 season. He also played for Piast Gliwice, followed by a short spell at Vistula Garfield in the USA. He also participated in the NASL Hartford Bi-Centennials. In 1975 Smuda returned to Poland to play for Legia Warsaw. In 1978, he returned to the USA again to play for three other NASL clubs. He finished his career as a player in Germany before turning his attention to managing.

== Managerial career ==
Smuda began his coaching career successfully in the lower leagues in Germany. During the late 1980s, he was appointed a manager in Turkey. He coached Altay Izmir and Konyaspor for a total of four years. In 1993, Smuda returned to Poland to help save Stal Mielec from relegation. During the seasons in Mielec, he managed to maintain the team in the Ekstraklasa.

=== Widzew Łódź ===
In May 1995, Smuda was appointed the manager of Widzew Łódź and finished in second place behind Legia Warsaw in the 1994–95 season. The following season, Smuda managed not losing a single game in the league. The 1995–96 season was another successful one with Widzew's Marek Koniarek scoring the most goals in the league at 29. Widzew qualified for the UEFA Champions League competition for the 1996–97 season. Smuda managed the team to eliminate the Danish champions, Brøndby IF and advanced to the group stage. Widzew were drawn into a group containing Atlético Madrid, Borussia Dortmund and Steaua Bucharest. Widzew finished the group in third place. The team from Łódź were able to repeat their feat of winning the Ekstraklasa again. The next season was not as promising as Widzew's management sold some of their key players and were eliminated in the qualifying phases of the Champions League. Widzew finished in 4th place that year and were unable to qualify for any European competitions. Shortly thereafter, Smuda moved to Wisła Kraków where he had much success.

=== Wisła Kraków ===
Smuda was appointed the manager of Wisła Kraków after the 1997–98 season. His goal was to build a team that would be not only be successful in Poland but also in European competitions. Smuda won the Polish League the following season, however, Wisła was ejected from European tournaments due to a fan throwing a knife at Dino Baggio during a UEFA Cup match against Parma. In September 1999, Smuda was dismissed as manager after team's first defeat in the 1997–98 season.

=== Legia Warsaw ===
After leaving Wisła in September 1999, Smuda was hired as manager of Legia Warsaw, replacing Dariusz Kubicki. However, he did not win any trophies or qualify for any European competitions. After a 4–0 defeat to Zagłębie Lubin in March 2001, Smuda was sacked.

=== Return to Wisła Kraków ===
In June 2001, Smuda was re-hired as a coach of Ekstraklasa champions Wisła Kraków. He failed to defeat FC Barcelona in the third qualifying round of the UEFA Champions League. After losing two league matches to Polonia Warsaw and Legia Warsaw in March 2002, he was sacked and replaced by Henryk Kasperczak.

=== Other clubs (2002–2006) ===
Subsequently, Smuda managed Widzew Łódź, Piotrcovia Piotrków Trybunalski as well as the Cypriot team Omonia.

In 2004, Smuda re-joined Odra Wodzisław, it was a return to his homeland. Smuda successfully helped the side stave off relegation. A year later, he finished third in the league with Zagłębie Lubin earning a spot in the UEFA Cup for the 2006–07 season.

=== Lech Poznań ===
In May 2006, Smuda was hired as the manager of Lech Poznań following the club's merger with Amica Wronki. He led the club to a sixth-place finish in the 2006–07 season and fourth the following season. He also qualified for 2008–09 UEFA Cup round of 32 with Lech. In the 2008–09 Ekstraklasa season, Lech Poznań managed to reach the top of the league table by the winter break, but a series of draws during the spring round resulted in a third-place finish at the end of the season. His contract with the club was not extended.

=== Return to Zagłębie ===
After several seasons with Lech Poznań, he returned to Zagłębie Lubin in September 2009.

=== Poland national team ===
On 29 October 2009, Smuda was chosen as the new manager of the Poland national team. After a disappointing UEFA Euro 2012 tournament in which Poland finished last in their group behind Russia, Greece and the Czech Republic, Smuda left his post as manager directly after the final defeat of the campaign.

== Personal life and death ==
Smuda was married to Małgorzata. He held a German passport. He died on 18 August 2024, at the age of 76.

== Honours ==
=== Managerial ===
Widzew Łódź

- Ekstraklasa: 1995–96, 1996–97, runner-up: 1994–95
- Polish Super Cup: 1996

Wisła Kraków

- Ekstraklasa: 1998–99
- Polish Super Cup: 2001

Zagłębie Lubin

- Ekstraklasa third place: 2005–06
- Polish Cup runner-up: 2005–06

Lech Poznań

- Ekstraklasa third place: 2008–09
- Polish Cup: 2008–09

Wieczysta Kraków

- IV liga Lesser Poland West: 2021–22
- Polish Cup (Lesser Poland regionals): 2021–22

Individual

- Polish Coach of the Year: 1996, 1997, 1999, 2008
- Ekstraklasa Hall of Fame: 2022
