= Tomasz Muchiński =

Polish football manager (born 1966)

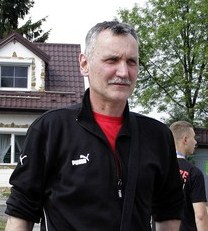
- Muchiński in 2016

Personal information
- Full name: Tomasz Antoni Muchiński
- Date of birth: 6 March 1966 (age 60)
- Place of birth: Łódź, Poland
- Height: 1.90 m (6 ft 3 in)
- Position: Goalkeeper

Team information
- Current team: Hutnik Kraków (youth goalkeeping coach)

Senior career*
Years	Team	Apps	(Gls)
1985–1988	Orzeł Łódź		
1990–1991	Stal Kutno		
1991–1992	Widzew Łódź		
1992	Polonia Warsaw		
1992–1993	Hutnik Warsaw		
1993–1997	Widzew Łódź	28	(0)

Managerial career
- 2002: Korona Kielce
- 2003: Widzew Łódź (caretaker)
- 2008: Sokół Aleksandrów Łódzki
- 2015: Jutrzenka Warta
- 2015–2016: Ner Poddębice
- 2016: Widzew Łódź
- 2016–2017: Zjednoczeni Stryków
- 2024: Watra Białka Tatrzańska
- * Club domestic league appearances and goals

Tomasz Antoni Muchiński (born 6 March 1966) is a Polish professional football manager and former player who played as a goalkeeper. He is currently the goalkeeping coach of Hutnik Kraków's youth teams.

== Managerial statistics ==
As of match played 19 June 2024

Managerial record by team and tenure
Team	From	To	Record							
Team	From	To	G	W	D	L	GF	GA	GD	Win %
Korona Kielce	July 2002	23 September 2002	10	4	2	4	11	9	+2	40.00
Widzew Łódź (caretaker)	7 April 2003	10 April 2003	1	0	0	1	0	1	−1	0.00
Sokół Aleksandrów Łódzki	16 June 2008	31 December 2008	26	14	6	6	48	26	+22	53.85
Jutrzenka Warta	1 September 2015	16 November 2015	16	8	5	3	31	21	+10	50.00
Ner Poddębice	16 November 2015	19 April 2016	7	0	1	6	0	13	−13	0.00
Widzew Łódź	24 October 2016	2 December 2016	6	2	1	3	8	11	−3	33.33
Zjednoczeni Stryków	30 December 2016	16 February 2017	0	0	0	0	0	0	+0	—
Watra Białka Tatrzańska	16 January 2024	30 June 2024	20	8	3	9	29	24	+5	40.00
Total			86	36	18	32	127	105	+22	41.86

== Honours ==
=== Player ===
Widzew Łódź

- Ekstraklasa: 1995–96, 1996–97
- Polish Super Cup: 1996
