= Zbigniew Wyciszkiewicz =

Polish footballer

Personal information
- Date of birth: 16 September 1969 (age 57)
- Place of birth: Strzelin, Poland
- Height: 1.76 m (5 ft 9 in)
- Position: Midfielder

Youth career
- –1986: LZS Gościęcin
- 1986–1988: Chemik Kędzierzyn-Koźle

Senior career*
Years	Team	Apps	(Gls)
1988–1992	Odra Opole		
1992–1997	Widzew Łódź	148	(22)
1997	ŁKS Łódź	6	(1)
1997	Royal Antwerp	14	(0)
1998–2000	ŁKS Łódź	63	(5)
2000	Polonia Warsaw	4	(0)
2001	ŁKS Łódź		
2001	Widzew Łódź	13	(1)
2001–2002	KSZO Ostrowiec Świętokrzyski	18	(0)
2002	Piotrcovia Piotrków Trybunalski	6	(0)
2003	Jersey Falcons		
2003	Widzew Łódź	9	(0)
2003	Jersey Falcons		
2004	Stal Głowno		
2005–2006	Zawisza Rzgów		

International career
1996	Poland	3	(0)
- * Club domestic league appearances and goals

Zbigniew Wyciszkiewicz (born 16 September 1969) is a Polish former professional footballer who played as a midfielder.

Wyciszkiewicz made three appearances for the Poland national football team.

== Honours ==
Widzew Łódź

- Ekstraklasa: 1995–96, 1996–97
- Polish Super Cup: 1996

ŁKS Łódź

- Ekstraklasa: 1997–98

Polonia Warsaw

- Polish Super Cup: 2000
