= Maciej Szczęsny =

Polish footballer

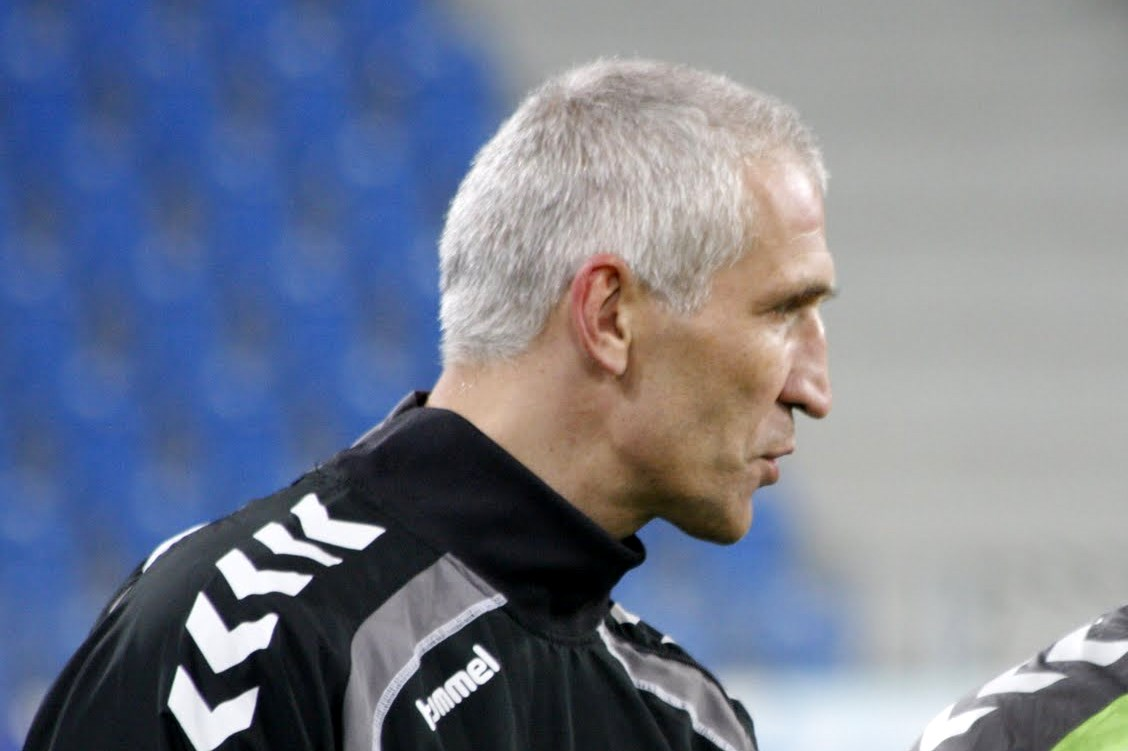
- Szczęsny in 2011

Personal information
- Full name: Maciej Wawrzyniec Szczęsny
- Date of birth: 28 June 1965 (age 61)
- Place of birth: Warsaw, Poland
- Height: 1.91 m (6 ft 3 in)
- Position: Goalkeeper

Senior career*
Years	Team	Apps	(Gls)
1983–1987	Gwardia Warsaw		
1987–1996	Legia Warsaw	140	(0)
1996–1998	Widzew Łódź	31	(0)
1998–2000	Polonia Warsaw	53	(0)
2000–2002	Wisła Kraków	12	(0)
Total		236	(0)

International career
1991–1996	Poland	7	(0)
- * Club domestic league appearances and goals

Maciej Wawrzyniec Szczęsny (pronounced [ˈmat͡ɕɛj ˈʂt͡ʂɛ̃snɨ]; born 28 June 1965) is a Polish former professional footballer who played as a goalkeeper. He is the only player in history to have won the Polish championship with four clubs; Legia Warsaw, Widzew Łódź, Polonia Warsaw and Wisła Kraków.

He participated in the 1995–96 UEFA Champions League with Legia Warsaw, reaching the quarter-finals, and in the 1996–97 edition with Widzew Łódź. He is the only player to have won a Polish championship with four clubs - in 1994 and 1995 with Legia, in 1997 with Widzew, in 2000 with Polonia and in 2001 with Wisła.

Szczęsny played seven times for the Poland national football team, though six of those appearances came in friendlies.

He is now a football pundit. His two sons play football as goalkeepers: Jan (born 1987) who retired early to become a goalkeeping coach, and Wojciech (born 1990), who had an illustrious career in European club football and became the most capped goalkeeper for the Polish national team.

== Honours ==
Legia Warsaw

- Ekstraklasa: 1993–94, 1994–95
- Polish Cup: 1989–90, 1993–94, 1994–95

Widzew Łódź

- Ekstraklasa: 1996–97

Polonia Warsaw

- Ekstraklasa: 1999–2000
- Polish Super Cup: 2000

Wisła Kraków

- Ekstraklasa: 2000–01
- Polish League Cup: 2000–01
