= Elasto Kapowezha =

Zimbabwean association footballer (born 1974)

Personal information
- Full name: Elasto Lungu Kapowezha
- Date of birth: 21 July 1974 (age 52)
- Place of birth: Zimbabwe
- Height: 1.73 m (5 ft 8 in)
- Position: Midfielder

Senior career*
Years	Team	Apps	(Gls)
1995	Sokół Tychy	2	(0)
1996	Dyskobolia Grodzisk		
1996–1997	Lech Poznań	5	(0)
1997–2000	AmaZulu		
2000–2002	Ria Stars		
2002–2003	Pietersburg Pillars		
2003	Dynamos		
2004–2005	Bidvest Wits		
- * Club domestic league appearances and goals

Elasto Lungu Kapowezha (born 21 July 1974) is a Zimbabwean former professional footballer who played as a midfielder.

== Early life ==
Kapowezha attended Churchill High School.

== Club career ==
He appeared in two Ekstraklasa fixtures for GKS Tychy in the 1995–96 season, and played five league games for Lech Poznań in the following campaign.

In 2006, he signed for South African side FC AK.

== International career ==
Kapowezha represented Zimbabwe internationally at youth level, where he was regarded as an important player as Zimbabwe achieved second place at the 1995 All-Africa Games. He was capped once for Zimbabwe, at the 1998 COSAFA Cup.

== Style of play ==
Kapowezha mainly operated as a midfielder.

== Post-playing career ==
Kapowezha obtained a degree in sports management and a certificate in business management from the University of South Africa.

After retiring from professional football, Kapowezha worked as a life skills coach.

== Personal life ==
Kapowezha was previously known as Elasto Lungu and is the son of Ephert Lungu a prominent Zimbabwean footballer in the 70s and 80s.

Kapowezha obtained permanent South Africa residency, having lived in the country for over twelve years. He is the father of Zimbabwean footballer Elasto Kapowezha Jr.
