= Paweł Wojtala =

Polish footballer

Personal information
- Date of birth: 27 October 1971 (age 55)
- Place of birth: Poznań, Poland
- Height: 1.90 m (6 ft 3 in)
- Position: Centre-back

Senior career*
| Years | Team | Apps | (Gls) |
| 1990–1996 | Lech Poznań | 123 | (8) |
| 1996 | Widzew Łódź | 18 | (4) |
| 1997–1998 | Hamburger SV | 20 | (1) |
| 1998–1999 | Werder Bremen | 21 | (1) |
| 2000–2001 | Legia Warsaw | 16 | (1) |
| 2001 | Lech Poznań | 7 | (1) |
| 2002–2003 | Rot-Weiß Oberhausen | 46 | (4) |
| 2003–2004 | LR Ahlen | 4 | (0) |
| 2004 | Karlsruher SC | 3 | (0) |
| 2004 | Lech Poznań | 8 | (0) |
| 2006 | Hallescher FC | 14 | (2) |
| 2007 | SK St. Andrä | | |

International career
| 1994–1997 | Poland | 12 | (0) |
- * Club domestic league appearances and goals

Paweł Wojtala (27 October 1972) is a Polish football administrator and former professional player who played as a centre-back. He spent most of his career in his native Poland and in Germany. He won 12 caps with the Poland national team.

Whilst at Werder Bremen he helped them win the 1998–99 DFB-Pokal, playing as a substitute in the final against Bayern Munich as Bremen won on penalties.

Since 6 August 2016, he is the president of the Greater Poland Football Association. He is currently suspended as a board member of the Polish Football Association, a role he has held since 2022.

== Honours ==
Lech Poznań

- Ekstraklasa: 1991–92, 1992–93
- I liga: 2001–02
- Polish Super Cup: 1992

Widzew Łódź

- Ekstraklasa: 1996–97

Werder Bremen

- DFB-Pokal: 1998–99
