= Andriy Mikhalchuk =

Ukrainian footballer

Personal information
- Full name: Andriy Serhiyovych Mikhalchuk (Андрій Сергійович Міхальчук)
- Date of birth: 3 November 1967 (age 58)
- Place of birth: Kiev, Ukrainian SSR, Soviet Union
- Height: 1.76 m (5 ft 9 1/2 in)
- Position: Defender

Youth career
- SportInternat Kiev
- 1985–1986: SKA Odessa (military service)

Senior career*
Years	Team	Apps	(Gls)
1987	Dynamo Kiev	0	(0)
1988–1990	FC Aktyubinets Aktyubinsk	65	(7)
1990–1992	Chemik Bydgoszcz		
1992–2001	Widzew Łódź	223	(25)
2002–2004	Stal Głowno		
2006–2009	Gra-Lech Jordanów		

International career
	Ukrainian SSR Youth team	2	(0)

Managerial career
- 2003: Stal Głowno
- 2003–2004: Stal Głowno (assistant)
- 2004: Gra-Lech Jordanów
- * Club domestic league appearances and goals

Andriy Mikhalchuk (Ukrainian: Андрій Міхальчук, Polish: Andrzej Michalczuk; born 3 November 1967) is a Ukrainian former professional footballer.

His career highlight was helping Widzew Łódź reach the Champions League group stage in 1996. This at the time meant that the president at the time Aleksander Kwaśniewski gave his support to granting him citizenship with a view to be called up to the national team; however ultimately he received his passport only after retirement from professional football, in 2005.

After retiring from football, he now works for the company "Gra Lech", specialising in fast-assembly tents and marquees.

== Honours ==
Widzew Łódź

- Ekstraklasa: 1995–96, 1996–97
