= Daniel Bogusz =

Polish former professional footballer

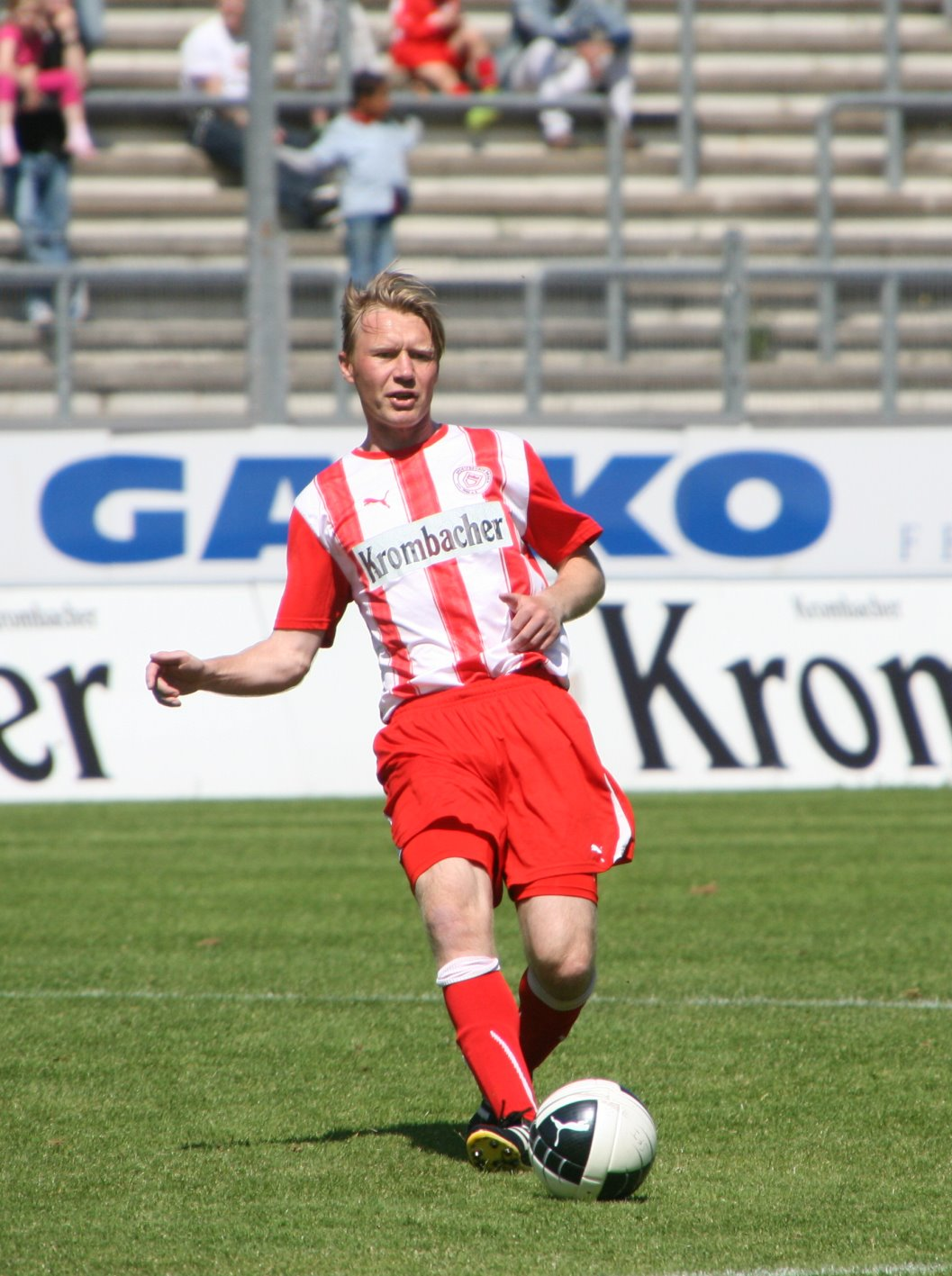

Personal information
- Date of birth: 21 September 1974 (age 52)
- Place of birth: Warsaw, Poland
- Height: 1.80 m (5 ft 11 in)
- Position: Defender

Senior career*
Years	Team	Apps	(Gls)
1990–1993	Jagiellonia Białystok	47	(2)
1993–2001	Widzew Łódź	212	(19)
2002–2005	Arminia Bielefeld	56	(1)
2005–2011	Sportfreunde Siegen	177	(12)
Total		492	(34)

International career
1997–2002	Poland	2	(0)
- * Club domestic league appearances and goals

Daniel Bogusz (born 21 September 1974) is a Polish former professional footballer who played as a defender.

== Club career ==
Bogusz was born in Warsaw. He played several seasons in the Polish Ekstraklasa with Jagiellonia Białystok and Widzew Łódź.

== International career ==
He also made two appearances for the Poland national football team.

== Honours ==
Widzew Łódź

- Ekstraklasa: 1995–96, 1996–97
- Polish Super Cup: 1996
