= Marcin Zając =

Polish footballer

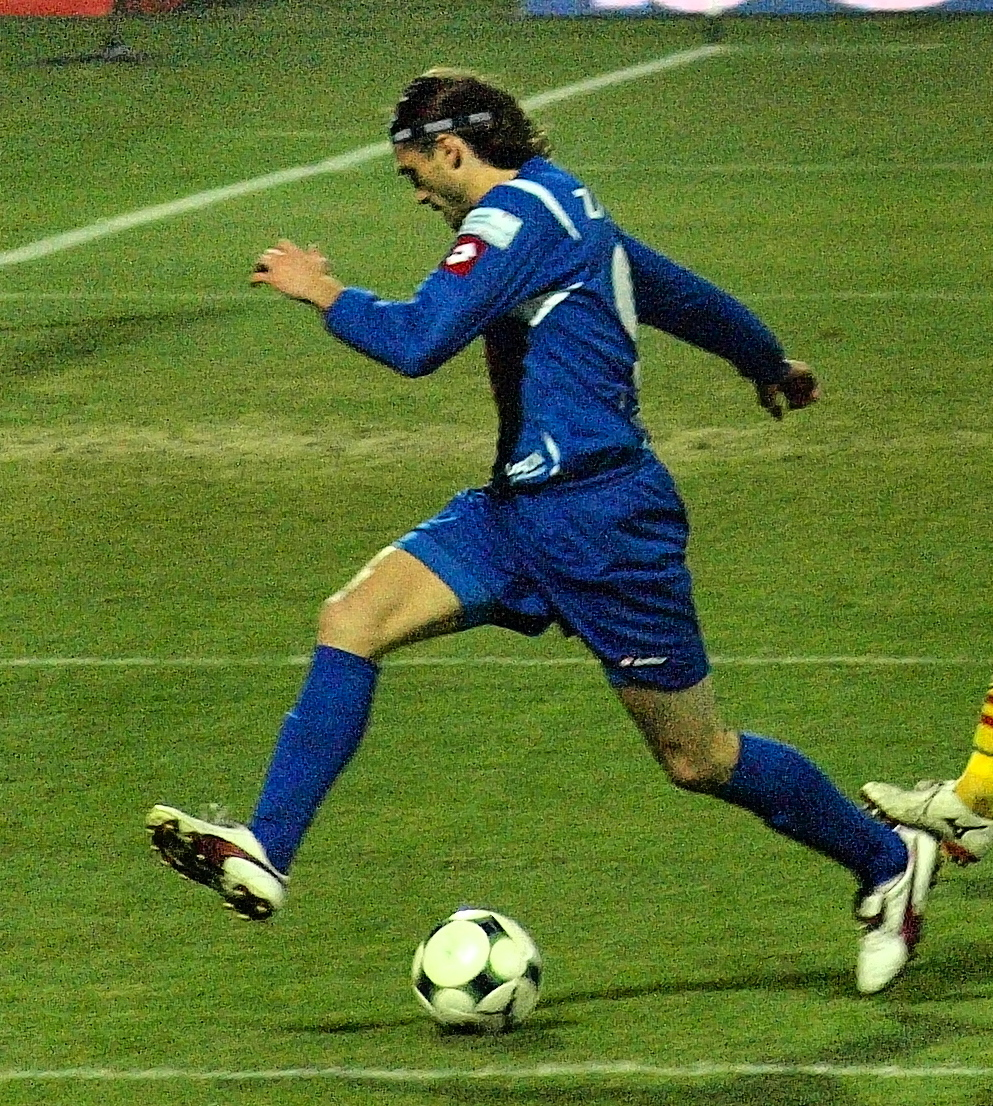
- Zając playing for Ruch Chorzów in 2009

Personal information
- Full name: Marcin Zając
- Date of birth: 19 May 1975 (age 51)
- Place of birth: Łódź, Poland
- Height: 1.80 m (5 ft 11 in)
- Position: Midfielder

Youth career
- 1992–1996: Start Łódź

Senior career*
Years	Team	Apps	(Gls)
1996–2002	Widzew Łódź	124	(17)
2002–2006	Dyskobolia Grodzisk Wielkopolski	80	(18)
2006–2008	Lech Poznań	55	(15)
2008–2010	Ruch Chorzów	48	(5)
2012–2013	Sorento Zadębie Skierniewice	14	(6)
2015	Widok Skierniewice	2	(0)
Total		323	(61)

International career
1997–2005	Poland	11	(0)
- * Club domestic league appearances and goals

Marcin Zając (born 19 May 1975) is a Polish former professional footballer who played as a midfielder.

== Club career ==
He started his career at Start Łódź. In 1996, he was bought by Widzew Łódź, participating in their 1996–97 UEFA Champions League campaign. In 2002, he joined Dyskobolia Grodzisk Wielkopolski where he played for four years. In July 2004, he had a trial with Rangers. Zając spent a couple years at Lech Poznań after joining them in 2006, before transferring to Ruch Chorzów in June 2008.

== International career ==
Marcin Zając has played 11 times for the Poland national football team.

== Honours ==
Widzew Łódź

- Ekstraklasa: 1996–97
