= Stanisław Dawidczyński =

Polish football manager

Personal information
- Date of birth: 29 September 1944 (age 82)
- Place of birth: Łódź, Poland
- Position: Midfielder

Senior career*
Years	Team	Apps	(Gls)
1962–1965	ŁKS Łódź		
1966–1967	Cracovia		
1968–1975	Gwardia Warsaw		
1976	Polish Eagles SC		
1976–1977	New York Apollo		
1978–1984	Polonez Warsaw		
1985–1987	Lappfjärd BK		

Managerial career
- 1978–1984: Polonez Warsaw (player-manager)
- 1985–1987: Lappfjärd BK (player-manager)
- 1988–1992: Polonia Warsaw
- 1992–1993: Hutnik Warsaw (assistant)
- 1993: Hutnik Warsaw
- 1993–1994: Stomil Olsztyn
- 1994: Ursus Warsaw
- 1994–1997: Okęcie Warsaw
- 1997–1998: Polonia Warsaw (assistant)
- 1998–2000: Okęcie Warsaw
- 2000: Stomil Olsztyn
- 2010–2011: Widzew Łódź II
- * Club domestic league appearances and goals

Stanisław Dawidczyński (born 29 September 1944) is a Polish former football manager and player.
