= Andrzej Woźniak =

Polish footballer

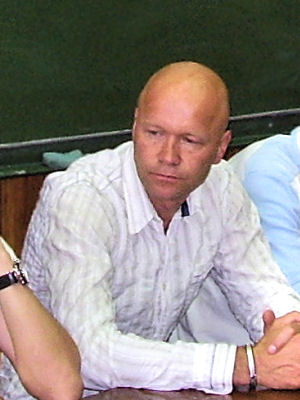

Personal information
- Date of birth: 23 October 1965 (age 60)
- Place of birth: Konin, Poland
- Height: 1.88 m (6 ft 2 in)
- Position: Goalkeeper

Team information
- Current team: Widzew Łódź (goalkeeping coach)

Youth career
- Górnik Konin

Senior career*
| Years | Team | Apps | (Gls) |
| 1978–1983 | Górnik Konin | | |
| 1984–1988 | Widzew Łódź | 0 | (0) |
| 1986–1987 | → Orzeł Łódź (loan) | | |
| 1988–1989 | GKS Bełchatów | 39 | (0) |
| 1989–1994 | ŁKS Łódź | 155 | (0) |
| 1994–1996 | Widzew Łódź | 65 | (0) |
| 1996–1997 | Porto | 7 | (0) |
| 1997–1998 | Braga | 15 | (0) |
| 1998–1999 | Lech Poznań | 13 | (0) |
| 1999–2002 | Widzew Łódź | 8 | (0) |

International career
| 1994–1997 | Poland | 20 | (0) |

Managerial career
- 2000–2002: Widzew Łódź (goalkeeping coach)
- 2002–2005: Korona Kielce (assistant)
- 2005–2006: Pogoń Szczecin (assistant)
- 2006–2008: Lech Poznań (goalkeeping coach)
- 2008–2010: Pogoń Szczecin (goalkeeping coach)
- 2011–2014: Widzew Łódź (goalkeeping coach)
- 2013–2014: Widzew Łódź (assistant)
- 2014: Widzew Łódź (goalkeeping coach)
- 2015: Dolcan Ząbki (goalkeeping coach)
- 2015–2018: Lechia Gdańsk (goalkeeping coach)
- 2018: Widzew Łódź (goalkeeping coach)
- 2018–2021: Poland (goalkeeping coach)
- 2021–: Widzew Łódź (goalkeeping coach)
- * Club domestic league appearances and goals

Andrzej Woźniak (born 23 October 1965) is a Polish goalkeeping coach and former professional footballer who played as a goalkeeper. He spent most of his career with ŁKS Łódź and Widzew Łódź, and also had a short spell in the Portuguese top flight. Known as one of the best goalkeepers in his country at the time, he made 20 appearances for the Poland national team.

== Club career ==
Starting at his hometown team of Górnik Konin, Woźniak spent much of his playing career in Łódź; first at ŁKS and then at Widzew, enjoying three separate spells at the club. It was with Widzew that Woźniak enjoyed his greatest success by winning the league title in the 1995–96 season. Not only did he have the joint best record in terms of goals conceded, the team remained undefeated throughout the successful campaign.

In 1996, Woźniak moved to Portuguese giants Porto, but appearances were limited at the club. He moved to Braga, but soon returned to Poland, first with Lech Poznań and then with Widzew Łódź once more.

== International career ==
Woźniak represented Poland 20 times at the international level. His moment of glory came in the 1996 European Championship qualifying match in Paris against France. With the score at 1–1, Woźniak saved a penalty by Bixente Lizarazu, as well as Vincent Guerin's rebound, earning himself a nickname 'The Prince of Paris'.

=== International statistics ===
Appearances, conceded goals and clean sheets by national team
| Team | Year | Apps | Conceded goals | Clean sheets |
|---|---|---|---|---|
| Poland | 1994 | 7 | 6 | 3 |
| Poland | 1995 | 5 | 6 | 2 |
| Poland | 1996 | 4 | 9 | 1 |
| Poland | 1997 | 4 | 7 | 1 |
| Total | | 20 | 28 | 7 |

== Coaching career ==
Between 2018 and 2021, Woźniak was employed by the Poland national team as a goalkeeping coach. Prior to this appointment, he held the same role with several Polish clubs, with Widzew Łódź, Korona Kielce, Pogoń Szczecin, Lech Poznań, Dolcan Ząbki and Lechia Gdańsk among them. Woźniak also worked as an assistant manager at some of the teams highlighted above including Widzew, Korona and Pogoń, before choosing to focus more on goalkeeping coaching. In February 2021, he was appointed goalkeeper coach at Widzew once more.

== Honours ==
Widzew Łódź

- Ekstraklasa: 1995–96

Porto

- Primeira Liga: 1996–97
