= Waldemar Jaskulski =

Polish footballer (born 1967)

Personal information
- Date of birth: 23 April 1967 (age 59)
- Place of birth: Sępólno Krajeńskie, Poland
- Height: 1.84 m (6 ft 0 in)
- Position: Defender

Senior career*
Years	Team	Apps	(Gls)
- Gryf Sępólno Krajeńskie
- Chemik Bydgoszcz
1988–1989	Chemik Police		
1992–1996	Pogoń Szczecin	100	(7)
1996	→ Widzew Łódź (loan)	16	(0)
1996–1999	Standard Liège	49	(3)
1999–2000	RFC Liège		
2001	RKS Radomsko		
2001	KP Police		
2002	Chemik/Zawisza Bydgoszcz		

International career
1993–1996	Poland	13	(1)
- * Club domestic league appearances and goals

Waldemar Jaskulski (born 23 April 1967) is a Polish former professional footballer who played as a defender. He played in thirteen matches for the Poland national team from 1993 to 1996.

== Honours ==
Widzew Łódź

- Ekstraklasa: 1995–96
