= Rafał Siadaczka =

Polish footballer

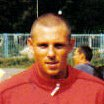
- Rafał Siadaczka in 2007.

Personal information
- Date of birth: 21 February 1972 (age 54)
- Place of birth: Radom, Poland
- Height: 1.82 m (6 ft 0 in)
- Position: Defender

Senior career*
Years	Team	Apps	(Gls)
1989–1991	Broń Radom		
1991–1992	Legia Warsaw	16	(1)
1992–1993	Broń Radom		
1993–1994	Radomiak Radom		
1994–1995	Petrochemia Płock	34	(12)
1995–1998	Widzew Łódź	101	(15)
1999	Austria Wien	27	(0)
2000–2002	Legia Warsaw	31	(1)
2003–2005	Mazowsze Grójec		
2004	→ Broń Radom (loan)		
2007–2010	Zodiak Sucha		
2011–2012	Orlęta Stromiec		

International career
1995–1999	Poland	17	(2)
- * Club domestic league appearances and goals

Rafał Siadaczka (born 21 February 1972) is a Polish former professional footballer who played as a defender.

The highlight of his career was playing in the Champions League with Widzew Łódź in 1996.

He retired due to struggles with diabetes; he distanced himself from football entirely not even watching any matches. He entered the construction industry running a building supplies shop near Radom with a business partner.

== Honours ==
Widzew Łódź

- Ekstraklasa: 1995–96, 1996–97
- Polish Super Cup: 1996

Legia Warsaw

- Ekstraklasa: 2001–02
- Polish League Cup: 2001–02
