= Tomasz Łapiński =

Polish footballer

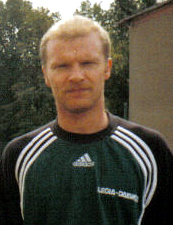

Personal information
- Date of birth: 1 August 1969 (age 57)
- Place of birth: Łapy, Polish People’s Republic
- Height: 1.83 m (6 ft 0 in)
- Position: Defender

Senior career*
Years	Team	Apps	(Gls)
1986–1987	Pogoń Łapy		
1987–1999	Widzew Łódź	313	(7)
2000–2002	Legia Warszawa	1	(0)
2003	Piotrcovia	4	(0)
2004	Widzew Łódź	0	(0)
2005	Mazowsze Grójec II		

International career
- Poland Olympic
1992–1999	Poland	36	(0)

Managerial career
- 2003: Widzew Łódź (caretaker)
- 2004: Widzew Łódź (caretaker)
Medal record
Representing Poland
Men's football
Olympic Games
Silver medal – second place	1992 Barcelona	Team
- * Club domestic league appearances and goals

Tomasz Łapiński (born 1 August 1969) is a Polish football pundit, co-commentator and former professional player who played as a defender.

== Career ==
He made 36 appearances for the Poland national team. Łapiński was a participant at the 1992 Summer Olympics, where Poland won the silver medal.

== Honours ==
Widzew Łódź

- Ekstraklasa: 1995–96
- Polish Super Cup: 1996

Poland Olympic

- Olympic silver medal: 1992
