= 1994–95 Ekstraklasa =

68th season of top-tier football league in Poland

Liga
- Season: 1994–95
- Champions: Legia Warsaw (6th title)
- Relegated: Petrochemia Płock; Stal Stalowa Wola; Ruch Chorzów; Warta Poznań
- Matches: 306
- Goals: 734 (2.4 per match)
- Top goalscorer: Bogusław Cygan (16 goals)
- Average attendance: 4,209 ▼0.6%

Statistics of the Ekstraklasa for the 1994–95 season.

== Overview ==
18 teams competed in the 1994–95 season with Legia Warsaw winning the championship.

== League table ==
Pos	Team	Pld	W	D	L	GF	GA	GD	Pts	Qualification or relegation
1	Legia Warsaw (C)	34	23	5	6	58	20	+38	51	Qualification to Champions League qualifying round
2	Widzew Łódź	34	17	11	6	47	25	+22	45	Qualification to UEFA Cup preliminary round
3	GKS Katowice	34	16	10	8	45	27	+18	42	Qualification to Cup Winners' Cup qualifying round
4	Zagłębie Lubin	34	16	10	8	48	41	+7	42	Qualification to UEFA Cup preliminary round
5	Górnik Zabrze	34	12	13	9	48	40	+8	37	Qualification to Intertoto Cup group stage
6	Lech Poznań	34	13	8	13	47	40	+7	34	
7	ŁKS Łódź	34	10	14	10	39	41	−2	34	
8	Pogoń Szczecin	34	10	13	11	33	34	−1	33	Qualification to Intertoto Cup group stage
9	Hutnik Kraków	34	9	14	11	37	39	−2	32	
10	Miliarder Pniewy	34	9	14	11	33	43	−10	32	
11	Stal Mielec	34	8	15	11	44	50	−6	31	
12	Olimpia Poznań	34	9	13	12	46	41	+5	31	
13	Raków Częstochowa	34	9	13	12	31	43	−12	31	
14	Stomil Olsztyn	34	7	16	11	35	40	−5	30	
15	Petrochemia Płock (R)	34	8	14	12	35	42	−7	30	Relegated to II liga
16	Stal Stalowa Wola (R)	34	10	9	15	34	47	−13	29	Relegated to II liga
17	Ruch Chorzów (R)	34	7	15	12	39	46	−7	29	Relegated to II liga
18	Warta Poznań (R)	34	7	5	22	35	75	−40	19	Relegated to II liga

Source: 90minut.pl (in Polish)
(C) Champions; (R) Relegated

== Results ==
Home \ Away	KAT	GÓR	HUT	LPO	LEG	ŁKS	MIL	OLP	PPŁ	POG	RAK	RUC	STA	SSW	STO	WAR	WID	ZLU
GKS Katowice		1–1	1–0	3–1	3–1	0–0	1–2	1–0	2–0	1–2	1–0	1–0	1–1	3–0	1–0	5–1	0–0	3–1
Górnik Zabrze	2–1		3–0	1–1	0–1	1–1	2–0	1–2	1–1	1–0	1–0	1–1	1–1	6–0	2–0	1–1	1–1	0–1
Hutnik Kraków	1–2	0–1		2–1	0–1	5–0	0–0	2–1	2–0	1–1	2–1	2–1	1–1	1–1	0–0	2–2	1–2	1–1
Lech Poznań	2–0	2–0	1–1		0–1	1–2	2–0	0–2	1–1	0–2	0–0	2–0	4–3	4–0	0–0	1–2	1–0	2–1
Legia Warsaw	1–0	2–0	1–0	0–1		3–0	4–0	1–0	3–0	2–1	3–0	4–0	2–0	1–0	3–2	5–0	2–0	2–0
ŁKS Łódź	0–0	4–1	1–1	0–2	0–2		3–0	2–1	1–0	3–0	2–0	3–1	1–1	0–0	0–0	2–0	2–4	1–2
Miliarder Pniewy	0–0	3–2	0–2	2–1	1–0	1–1		1–1	1–0	0–0	1–2	1–1	3–0	1–0	1–2	4–0	0–0	1–2
Olimpia Poznań	1–1	2–2	3–1	0–2	1–2	3–0	0–0		1–1	1–1	6–2	1–2	0–0	4–3	0–0	1–1	2–0	0–1
Petrochemia Płock	3–0	2–2	2–0	2–1	0–0	2–2	0–0	1–3		1–0	4–1	2–0	1–1	1–0	0–0	2–3	0–2	2–2
Pogoń Szczecin	1–0	1–3	1–1	3–2	1–1	0–0	4–0	1–1	0–0		0–0	0–0	0–0	1–0	2–2	3–1	1–0	3–0
Raków Częstochowa	1–1	2–0	0–0	1–2	1–1	1–1	2–2	1–0	0–0	3–0		1–1	0–0	2–0	2–1	2–1	1–0	1–1
Ruch Chorzów	3–2	1–1	1–1	1–0	0–2	0–0	1–1	1–4	3–1	1–1	1–1		1–1	0–1	7–0	3–0	1–1	0–0
Stal Mielec	1–3	3–2	1–1	2–2	1–2	3–2	3–3	1–0	1–1	2–1	4–0	4–2		1–3	1–0	2–0	1–2	0–1
Stal Stalowa Wola	0–1	2–3	1–1	1–1	1–0	1–0	1–1	2–2	2–1	1–0	2–0	0–0	1–1		2–1	4–1	0–2	3–1
Stomil Olsztyn	0–1	1–1	2–1	1–0	3–3	1–1	4–0	0–0	0–0	2–1	0–1	0–0	4–1	1–1		3–1	0–0	2–2
Warta Poznań	0–4	2–3	0–2	0–2	1–0	1–2	1–1	3–0	1–3	0–1	1–0	3–4	2–0	2–0	2–2		0–4	1–3
Widzew Łódź	0–0	0–0	4–0	4–3	1–1	1–0	0–2	2–1	3–0 (Note: The match between Widzew and Petrochemia (originally finished 2–0) verified to wo. An ineligible player fielded by Petrochemia (Paweł Kędzierski).)	2–0	2–2	2–0	1–1	1–0	2–1	2–0		1–1
Zagłębie Lubin	1–1	0–1	1–2	2–2	2–1	2–2	1–0	2–2	4–1	2–0	2–0	2–1	2–1	2–1	1–0	2–1	0–2	

Source: 90minut.pl (in Polish)
Legend: Blue = home team win; Yellow = draw; Red = away team win.

== Top goalscorers ==
Rank	Player	Club	Goals
1	(Poland) Bogusław Cygan	Stal Mielec	16
2	(Poland) Jacek Dembiński	Lech Poznań	15
2	(Poland) Sławomir Majak	Zagłębie Lubin	15
2	(Poland) Jerzy Podbrożny	Legia Warsaw	15
5	(Poland) Piotr Prabucki	Warta Poznań	14
6	(Poland) Krzysztof Bukalski	Hutnik Kraków	13
7	(Poland) Piotr Burlikowski	Olimpia Poznań	12
7	(Poland) Rafał Siadaczka	Petrochemia Płock	12
7	(Poland) Mariusz Śrutwa	Ruch Chorzów	12

== Attendances ==
No.	Club	Average	Highest
1	Stomil Olsztyn	10,441	14,000
2	Petrochemia Płock	7,003	14,000
3	Raków Częstochowa	6,853	10,000
4	Legia Warszawa	6,382	16,000
5	Pogoń Szczecin	5,806	8,000
6	Widzew Łódź	5,707	22,000
7	Górnik Zabrze	4,198	6,997
8	Stal Stalowa Wola	3,824	6,000
9	Ruch Chorzów	3,793	10,000
10	ŁKS	3,741	10,814
11	Lech Poznań	3,303	7,000
12	Zagłębie Lubin	3,259	8,500
13	GKS Katowice	2,882	7,000
14	Stal Mielec	2,249	3,203
15	Hutnik Kraków	1,676	4,000
16	Olimpia Poznań	1,618	5,000
17	Warta Poznań	1,535	6,000
18	Miliarder Pniewy	1,500	6,000
