= Bronisław Waligóra =

Polish footballer and coach

Personal information
- Date of birth: 25 September 1932 (age 94)
- Place of birth: Sielec Biskupi, Poland
- Position: Striker

Youth career
- Lechia 06 Mysłowice

Senior career*
Years	Team	Apps	(Gls)
- AKS Chorzów
- Pomorzanin Toruń
1956–1968	Zawisza Bydgoszcz		

Managerial career
- 1971–1972: Zawisza Bydgoszcz
- 1974–1975: Zawisza Bydgoszcz
- 1978: Widzew Łódź
- 1979–1982: Motor Lublin
- 1983–1984: Bałtyk Gdynia
- 1985–1986: Widzew Łódź
- 1986–1987: Lech Poznań
- 1989: Widzew Łódź
- 1990–1993: Avia Świdnik
- 1995–1996: Zawisza Bydgoszcz
- 1996–1997: Hetman Zamość
- * Club domestic league appearances and goals

Bronisław Waligóra (born 25 September 1932) is a Polish former football player and manager.

== Career ==
=== Playing career ===
Waligóra played for AKS Chorzów, Pomorzanin Toruń and Zawisza Bydgoszcz.

=== Coaching career ===
Waligóra managed Zawisza Bydgoszcz, Widzew Łódź, Motor Lublin, Bałtyk Gdynia, Lech Poznań, Avia Świdnik and Hetman Zamość.

== Honours ==
=== Manager ===
Motor Lublin

- II liga, group II: 1979–80

Widzew Łódź

- Polish Cup: 1984–85
