= Stomil Olsztyn =

Association football club in Poland

- Nickname: Duma Warmii
- Founded: 15 July 1945; 81 years ago (as OKS Warmiak)
- Ground: OSiR Stadium
- Capacity: 16,800
- Owner: Stomil Olsztyn S.A.
- Chairman: Marcin Burza
- Manager: Michał Kraszewski
- League: IV liga Warmia-Masuria
- 2025–26: IV liga Warmia-Masuria, 2nd of 16
- Website: www.stomilolsztyn.com
Home colours	Away colours

Stomil Olsztyn, historically known and played under the names OKS 1945 Olsztyn and OKS Stomil Olsztyn, is a Polish football club based in Olsztyn. In the 2026–27 season, they compete in the IV liga Warmia-Masuria.

Founded on 15 July 1945 as OKS Warmiak, the club had its brightest era in the 1990s, when it played in the Polish top flight. Between 2004 and 2012, the team was known as OKS 1945 Olsztyn, then also as OKS Stomil Olsztyn.

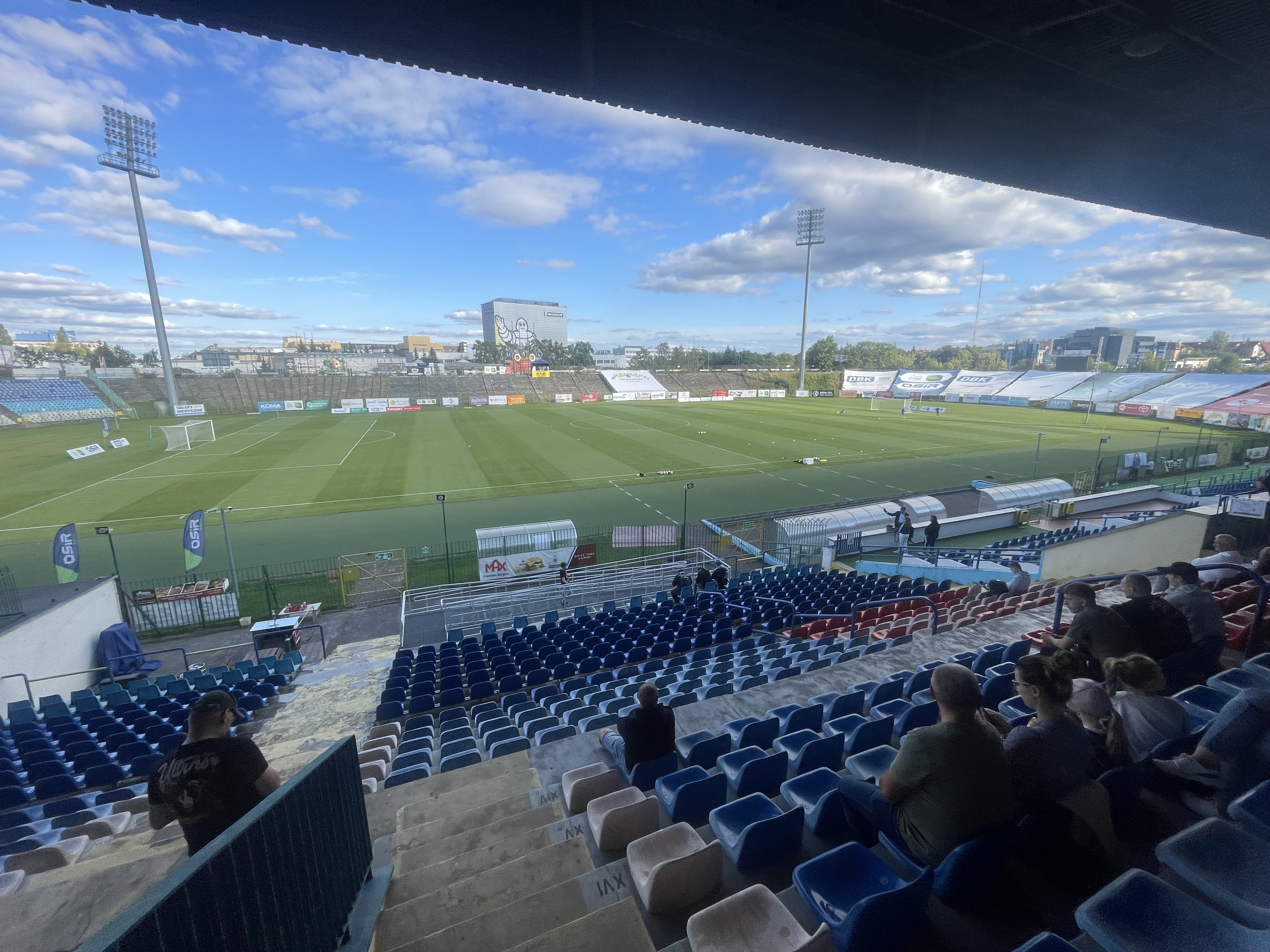
OSiR Stadium

== Honours ==
- Ekstraklasa sixth place: 1995–96
- Polish Cup quarter-finalists: 1998–99, 2000–01

== Crest ==
The club's crest depicts a great cormorant.

== Players ==
=== Current squad ===
As of 20 January 2025

Note: Flags indicate national team as defined under FIFA eligibility rules; some limited exceptions apply. Players may hold more than one non-FIFA nationality.

No.	Pos.	Nation	Player
1	GK	POL	Mateusz Małecki
4	DF	POL	Paweł Flis
5	MF	POL	Tobiasz Szatkowski (on loan from Błękitni Stary Olsztyn)
6	DF	POL	Adam Paliwoda
7	FW	GEO	Tamaz Babunadze
8	MF	JPN	Tatsuya Taguchi
9	FW	POL	Kacper Sionkowski
10	MF	POL	Karol Żwir (captain)
14	DF	POL	Eryk Kosek
15	DF	POL	Piotr Jakubowski
16	FW	POL	Jakub Bałdyga (on loan from Pisa Barczewo)
17	FW	POL	Jakub Karpiński
18	DF	POL	Przemysław Klugier
19	MF	POL	Denis Gojko
20	DF	POL	Oskar Bienenda

No.	Pos.	Nation	Player
21	DF	POL	Mateusz Jońca
22	MF	POL	Maciej Cichocki
23	DF	POL	Mateusz Pajdak
26	MF	POL	Jakub Fronczak
28	MF	POL	Piotr Łysiak
30	GK	POL	Łukasz Jakubowski
38	MF	POL	Maciej Niemier
42	MF	POL	Jakub Orpik
63	MF	USA	Kacper Skonieczny
—	MF	POL	Łukasz Borkowski
—	FW	POL	Kacper Gwardiak
—	MF	POL	Paweł Łastowski
—	FW	POL	Filip Nilipiński
—	MF	POL	Filip Sokół

=== Out on loan ===
Note: Flags indicate national team as defined under FIFA eligibility rules; some limited exceptions apply. Players may hold more than one non-FIFA nationality.

No.	Pos.	Nation	Player
—	MF	POL	Maciej Kurpiel (at Pilica Białobrzegi until 30 June 2025)

=== Retired numbers ===
Note: Flags indicate national team as defined under FIFA eligibility rules; some limited exceptions apply. Players may hold more than one non-FIFA nationality.

No.	Pos.	Nation	Player
2	DF	POL	Andrzej Biedrzycki (1985–01, 2002 – posthumous honour)

== Stomil's achievements ==
=== Before promotions to First League ===
Season	League	Position	Games	Points	Goals	↑↓
1970–71	3rd League	15	30	19	20–48	↓
1973–74	2nd League	12	30	27	20–29	
1974–75	2nd League	15	30	26	25–29	↓
1976–77	3rd League	3	26	36	44–14	
1977–78	3rd League	2	26	36	51–19	
1978–79	3rd League	2	26	37	37–14	
1979–80	3rd League	4	28	35	34–23	
1980–81	3rd League	4	26	31	42–25	
1981–82	3rd League	11	26	19	25–36	
1982–83	3rd League	4	26	30	37–27	
1983–84	3rd League	8	26	24	29–23	

Season	League	Position	Games	Points	Goals	↑↓
1984–85	3rd League	5	26	30	42–28	
1985–86	3rd League	6	26	27	27–22	
1986–87	3rd League	2	26	34	36–25	
1987–88	3rd League	1	26	41	49–24	↑
1988–89	2nd League	11	30	25	26–37	↓
1989–90	3rd League	5	36	46	44–29	
1990–91	3rd League	2	26	43	61–15	↑
1991–92	2nd League	12	34	32	38–45	
1992–93	2nd League	5	34	41	54–38	
1993–94	2nd League	1	34	49	52–20	↑

=== In Ekstraklasa ===
Season	Position	Games	Points	Wins	Draws	Defeats	Goals	Comments
1994–95	14	34	30	7	16	11	35–40	
1995–96	6	34	46	13	7	14	32–41	
1996–97	9	34	44	12	8	14	45–46	
1997–98	11	34	45	12	9	13	38–45	
1998–99	9	30	37	10	7	13	29–38	
1999–2000	8	30	37	8	13	9	33–43	
2000–01	14	30	34	10	4	16	22–41	playoffs → remained in 1st League
2001–02	8	14	10	2	4	7	10–24	group B (1st round)
2001–02	8	14	18	2	7	5	11–21	relegation group (2nd round) → relegation from 1st League

=== After relegation from Ekstraklasa ===
Season	League	Position	Games	Points	Wins	Draws	Defeats	Goals	↑↓
2002–03	II liga	18	34	22	4	10	20	26–68	↓
2004–05	III liga, group: 1	13	30	38	9	11	10	30–30	↓
2005–06	IV liga, group: Warmian–Masurian	3	34	72	21	9	4	72–23	
2006–07	IV liga, group: Warmian–Masurian	1	30	81	27	0	3	87–27	↑
2007–08	III liga, group: 1	5	30	57	15	12	3	51–22	
2008–09	II liga, west group	4	34	60	18	6	10	63–41	
2009–10	II liga, west group	13	34	39	10	9	15	36–45	
2010–11	II liga, west group	5	34	53	13	14	7	43–34	
2011–12	II liga, west group	2	34	55	17	4	9	43–32	↑
2012–13	I liga	13	34	38	8	14	12	37–45	
2013–14	I liga	15	34	41	10	11	13	38–42	*
2014–15	I liga	7	34	49	12	13	9	47–47	
2015–16	I liga	11	34	44	11	11	12	34–42	
2016–17	I liga	13	34	37	9	13	12	48–50	
2017–18	I liga	14	34	39	12	4	18	39–50	
2018–19	I liga	11	34	40	11	10	13	38–43	
2019–20	I liga	10	34	46	13	7	14	30–38	
2020–21	I liga	15	34	35	9	8	17	31–48	
2021–22	I liga	16	34	35	10	5	19	32–52	↓
2022–23	II liga	4	34	57	14	15	5	51–32	Lost the promotion play-offs final to Motor Lublin
2023–24	II liga	18	34	34	9	8	18	30–42	↓
2024–25	III liga, group I	14	34	42	11	9	14	44–56	↓
2025–26	IV liga Warmia-Masuria	2	30	69	22	3	5	93–26	Lost the promotion play-offs final to Mazovia Mińsk Mazowiecki

== Notable managers ==
- Józef Łobocki
- Bogusław Kaczmarek
- Jerzy Budziłek
- Stanisław Dawidczyński
- Zbigniew Kieżun
- Ryszard Polak
- Marek Chojnacki
- Jerzy Masztaler
- Maciej Radkiewicz
