= Jacek Dembiński =

Polish footballer (born 1969)

Personal information
- Date of birth: 20 December 1969 (age 56)
- Place of birth: Poznań, Poland
- Height: 1.90 m (6 ft 3 in)
- Position: Forward

Senior career*
Years	Team	Apps	(Gls)
1991–1995	Lech Poznań	91	(30)
1995	Lausanne-Sport	19	(3)
1996	Lech Poznań	15	(4)
1996–1997	Widzew Łódź	35	(20)
1997–2000	Hamburger SV	69	(11)
2001	Widzew Łódź	15	(3)
2001–2006	Amica Wronki	137	(37)
2006–2007	Lech Poznań	11	(1)
Total		392	(109)

International career
1994–1998	Poland	10	(0)
- * Club domestic league appearances and goals

Jacek Dembiński (born 20 December 1969) is a Polish former professional footballer who played as a forward.

== Honours ==
Lech Poznań

- Ekstraklasa: 1991–92, 1992–93, 1996–97
