= Rafał Pawlak =

Polish footballer

Personal information
- Date of birth: 16 January 1970 (age 56)
- Place of birth: Łódź, Poland
- Height: 1.76 m (5 ft 9 in)
- Position: Midfielder

Senior career*
Years	Team	Apps	(Gls)
1998–1995	ŁKS Łódź	146	(6)
1995	Górnik Konin		
1996	Śląsk Wrocław	14	(0)
1996–1999	ŁKS Łódź	87	(8)
1999–2001	Widzew Łódź	56	(15)
2001	Guangzhou R&F F.C.		
2002	Ionikos F.C.	14	(0)
2002–2003	Pogoń Szczecin	26	(3)
2003–2006	Widzew Łódź	85	(21)

Managerial career
- 2007–2008: Widzew Łódź II
- 2010–2011: Widzew Łódź II (assistant)
- 2011–2012: Sokół Aleksandrów Łódzki
- 2013: Tur Turek
- 2013: Widzew Łódź II
- 2013–2014: Widzew Łódź
- 2014: Widzew Łódź (assistant)
- 2014: Widzew Łódź
- 2015: Flota Świnoujście (assistant)
- * Club domestic league appearances and goals

Rafał Pawlak (born 16 January 1970) is a Polish professional football manager and former player who played as a midfielder.

== Honours ==
ŁKS Łódź

- Ekstraklasa: 1997–98

Widzew Łódź

- II liga: 2005–06
