= 1992–93 Ekstraklasa =

66th season of top-tier football league in Poland

I liga
- Season: 1992–93
- Champions: Lech Poznań (5th title)
- Relegated: Szombierki Bytom; Śląsk Wrocław; Olimpia Poznań; Jagiellonia Białystok
- Matches: 302
- Goals: 786 (2.6 per match)
- Top goalscorer: Jerzy Podbrożny (25 goals)
- Average attendance: 3,724 ▼22.0%

The 1992–93 Ekstraklasa (then known as I liga) was the 58th season of the highest tier domestic division in the Polish football league system since its establishment in 1927.

It was contested by 18 teams. Siarka Tarnobrzeg made their first Ekstraklasa appearance in the club's history.

Lech Poznań successfully defended their title after two final day games (Wisła Kraków vs Legia Warsaw 0–6; ŁKS Łódź vs Olimpia Poznań 7–1) had been cancelled due to allegations of "unsportsmanlike conduct during the game". Known colloquially as "The Sunday of Miracles", UEFA subsequently disqualified Polish clubs from the 1993–94 UEFA Cup.

== League table ==
Pos	Team	Pld	W	D	L	GF	GA	GD	Pts	Qualification or relegation
1	Lech Poznań (C)	34	17	13	4	70	29	+41	47	Qualification to Champions League first round
2	Legia Warsaw (Note: Two final day games (Wisła Kraków vs Legia Warsaw 0–6; ŁKS Łódź vs Olimpia Poznań 7–1) were cancelled.)	33	20	7	6	50	26	+24	47	
3	ŁKS Łódź	33	18	11	4	50	26	+24	47	
4	Ruch Chorzów	34	19	6	9	52	27	+25	44	
5	Widzew Łódź	34	16	11	7	60	42	+18	43	
6	Stal Mielec	34	12	15	7	41	28	+13	39	
7	Pogoń Szczecin	34	15	9	10	35	33	+2	39	
8	GKS Katowice	34	13	11	10	52	36	+16	37	Qualification to Cup Winners' Cup first round
9	Górnik Zabrze	34	11	13	10	43	40	+3	35	
10	Wisła Kraków	33	12	10	11	49	37	+12	34	
11	Siarka Tarnobrzeg	34	11	9	14	39	38	+1	31	
12	Zagłębie Lubin	34	10	10	14	48	41	+7	30	
13	Zawisza Bydgoszcz	34	12	6	16	41	60	−19	30	
14	Hutnik Kraków	34	8	13	13	40	46	−6	29	
15	Szombierki Bytom (R)	34	8	7	19	31	59	−28	23	Relegated to II liga
16	Śląsk Wrocław (R)	34	9	5	20	33	72	−39	23	Relegated to II liga
17	Olimpia Poznań (R)	33	7	7	19	27	49	−22	21	Relegated to II liga
18	Jagiellonia Białystok (R)	34	2	5	27	28	91	−63	9	Relegated to II liga

Source: 90minut.pl (in Polish)
(C) Champions; (R) Relegated

== Results ==
Home \ Away	KAT	GÓR	HUT	JAG	LPO	LEG	ŁKS	OLP	POG	RUC	SIA	STA	SZB	ŚLĄ	WID	WIS	ZLU	ZAW
GKS Katowice		0–0	0–2	7–1	1–3	1–1	0–0	0–0	1–0	1–1	4–1	2–2	5–0	4–2	1–3	2–0	2–0	2–1
Górnik Zabrze	1–1		1–1	3–2	2–2	0–3	1–2	4–0	3–1	1–1	0–1	0–0	4–2	3–2	1–2	3–1	3–1	3–0
Hutnik Kraków	1–4	3–0		4–0	1–2	1–0	2–3	1–0	3–0	0–2	1–1	1–1	3–0	2–0	2–2	2–2	0–0	0–1
Jagiellonia Białystok	0–0	2–2	0–0		0–5	3–1	1–2	2–1	0–1	0–3	0–3	0–5	2–3	2–2	0–3	0–1	1–2	0–1
Lech Poznań	1–2	5–0	7–1	5–0		2–2	0–0	6–1	3–0	2–0	1–1	0–0	1–0	3–1	3–3	2–3	2–0	2–2
Legia Warsaw	3–1	1–0	2–0	1–0	1–1		2–0	2–0	1–0	0–0	2–0	1–0	4–0	1–0	2–1	1–1	2–1	5–1
ŁKS Łódź	1–0	1–2	2–2	5–0	0–0	1–1		– (Note: The matches ŁKS Łódź - Olimpia Poznań (originally finished 7–1) and Wisła Kraków - Legia Warszawa (originally finished 0–6) were cancelled due to matches fixing allegation. Later, this decision of the Polish Football Association was recognized as groundless in the court, but PZPN never gave back the champions' title to Legia.)	2–0	2–1	3–0	0–0	2–1	3–2	3–3	1–1	2–1	3–2
Olimpia Poznań	1–0	0–0	0–0	1–1	1–2	1–3	2–0		1–2	1–0	1–1	1–0	1–2	5–0	2–2	0–2	0–0	1–2
Pogoń Szczecin	1–1	0–0	2–0	3–2	2–0	1–1	0–1	1–0		0–3	0–0	1–0	2–1	3–1	1–1	1–1	0–0	3–1
Ruch Chorzów	1–0	1–0	2–1	2–0	2–0	2–0	2–2	2–0	0–1		3–1	0–1	1–0	5–0	0–2	2–1	1–0	2–0
Siarka Tarnobrzeg	1–1	1–1	2–0	2–0	0–1	1–2	0–1	3–0 (Note: The match between Siarka and Olimpia didn't take place. Olimpia didn't arrive to Tarnobrzeg.)	0–1	1–0		2–2	3–0	3–1	1–0	0–0	3–3	2–0
Stal Mielec	2–1	0–0	0–0	4–1	1–2	0–1	1–1	2–0	1–1	2–1	2–0		1–1	0–2	1–1	0–0	0–0	3–2
Szombierki Bytom	0–3	1–0	3–1	2–1	0–0	1–2	0–0	0–2	0–0	0–4	4–2	1–2		1–2	0–1	2–1	1–1	0–0
Śląsk Wrocław	3–1	0–2	1–0	2–1	0–0	1–0	0–1	0–4	3–1	0–2	1–0	0–2	3–3		1–3	0–3 (Note: The match between Śląsk and Wisła interrupted in 73 minute at the result 0–2, due to a crowd trouble and verified to wo.)	3–2	0–0
Widzew Łódź	1–2	1–1	2–2	2–0	0–3	2–0	2–0	3–0	2–1	3–3	3–0	1–2	1–0	2–0		2–0	2–2	2–1
Wisła Kraków	1–1	1–1	1–1	6–3	0–0	–	0–3	1–0	0–1	0–1	0–2	2–0	2–0	5–0	4–0		2–0	6–1
Zagłębie Lubin	0–1	0–1	1–0	3–0	2–2	3–1	2–3	2–0	0–1	1–1	2–0	1–1	1–2	7–0	2–1	3–0		4–1
Zawisza Bydgoszcz	1–0	1–0	2–2	4–3	0–2	0–1	1–3	3–0	0–3	4–1	2–1	1–3	1–0	0–0	1–1	2–1	2–1	

Source: 90minut.pl (in Polish)
Legend: Blue = home team win; Yellow = draw; Red = away team win.

== Top goalscorers ==
Rank	Player	Club	Goals
1	(Poland) Jerzy Podbrożny	Lech Poznań	25
2	(Poland) Maciej Śliwowski	Legia Warsaw	24
3	(Poland) Marek Koniarek	Widzew Łódź	23
4	(Poland) Daniel Dylus	Zagłębie Lubin	15
4	(Poland) Radosław Gilewicz	Ruch Chorzów	15
6	(Poland) Leszek Iwanicki	Widzew Łódź	14
6	(Poland) Cezary Kucharski	Siarka Tarnobrzeg	14
8	(Poland) Andrzej Orzeszek	Szombierki Bytom	12
8	(Russia) Sergei Basov	Śląsk Wrocław	12
8	(Poland) Tomasz Wieszczycki	ŁKS Łódź	12
8	(Poland) Dariusz Wolny	GKS Katowice	12

== Attendances ==
#	Club	Average
1	Lech Poznań	7,765
2	Legia Warszawa	7,594
3	Pogoń Szczecin	6,706
4	Siarka Tarnobrzeg	4,765
5	Widzew Łódź	4,534
6	Ruch Chorzów	3,861
7	Wisła Kraków	3,829
8	ŁKS	3,724
9	Stal Mielec	3,427
10	Zawisza Bydgoszcz	2,906
11	Górnik Zabrze	2,818
12	Hutnik Kraków	2,735
13	Śląsk Wrocław	2,620
14	GKS Katowice	2,412
15	Zagłębie Lubin	2,179
16	Olimpia Poznań	2,056
17	Jagiellonia Białystok	1,674
18	Szombierki Bytom	1,429
