= Marek Woziński =

Polish football manager

Personal information
- Date of birth: 19 March 1956 (age 70)
- Place of birth: Łódź, Poland

Managerial career
- Years: Team
- 1980–1985: Zjednoczenie Stryków
- 1987: Arka Nowa Sól
- 1993: Widzew Łódź
- 1994: Ślęza Wrocław
- 1995: RKS Radomsko
- 1996: RKS Radomsko
- 1999: Hetman Włoszczowa
- 1999: RKS Radomsko
- 2001: Świt Nowy Dwór Mazowiecki
- 2002: ŁKS Łódź

Marek Woziński (born 19 March 1956) is a Polish former professional football manager.
