= Widzew Łódź =

Polish association football club

- Full name: RTS Widzew Łódź
- Nicknames: Widzewiacy; Czerwona Armia (Red Army)
- Founded: 25 November 1910; 115 years ago as TMRF Widzew; 24 January 1922; 104 years ago as RTS Widzew
- Ground: Widzew Łódź Stadium
- Capacity: 18,018
- Chairman: Robert Dobrzycki (acting)
- Manager: Mateusz Stolarski
- League: Ekstraklasa
- 2025–26: Ekstraklasa, 14th of 18
- Website: widzew.com
| Home colours | Away colours | Third colours |

RTS Widzew Łódź (Polish pronunciation: [ˈɛr ˈtɛ ˈɛs ˈvʲidzɛf ˈwut͡ɕ]) is a Polish football club based in Łódź. Formed in 1922, it later named itself the successor of the TMRF Widzew founded in 1910. Its official colours are red and white, hence their nicknames Czerwona Armia (Red Army) and Czerwono-biało-czerwoni (Red-white-reds). They compete in the Ekstraklasa, the top tier of the Polish football league system, since the 2022–23 season. Widzew is one of only two Poland clubs to have participated in the UEFA Champions League group stage.

== History ==
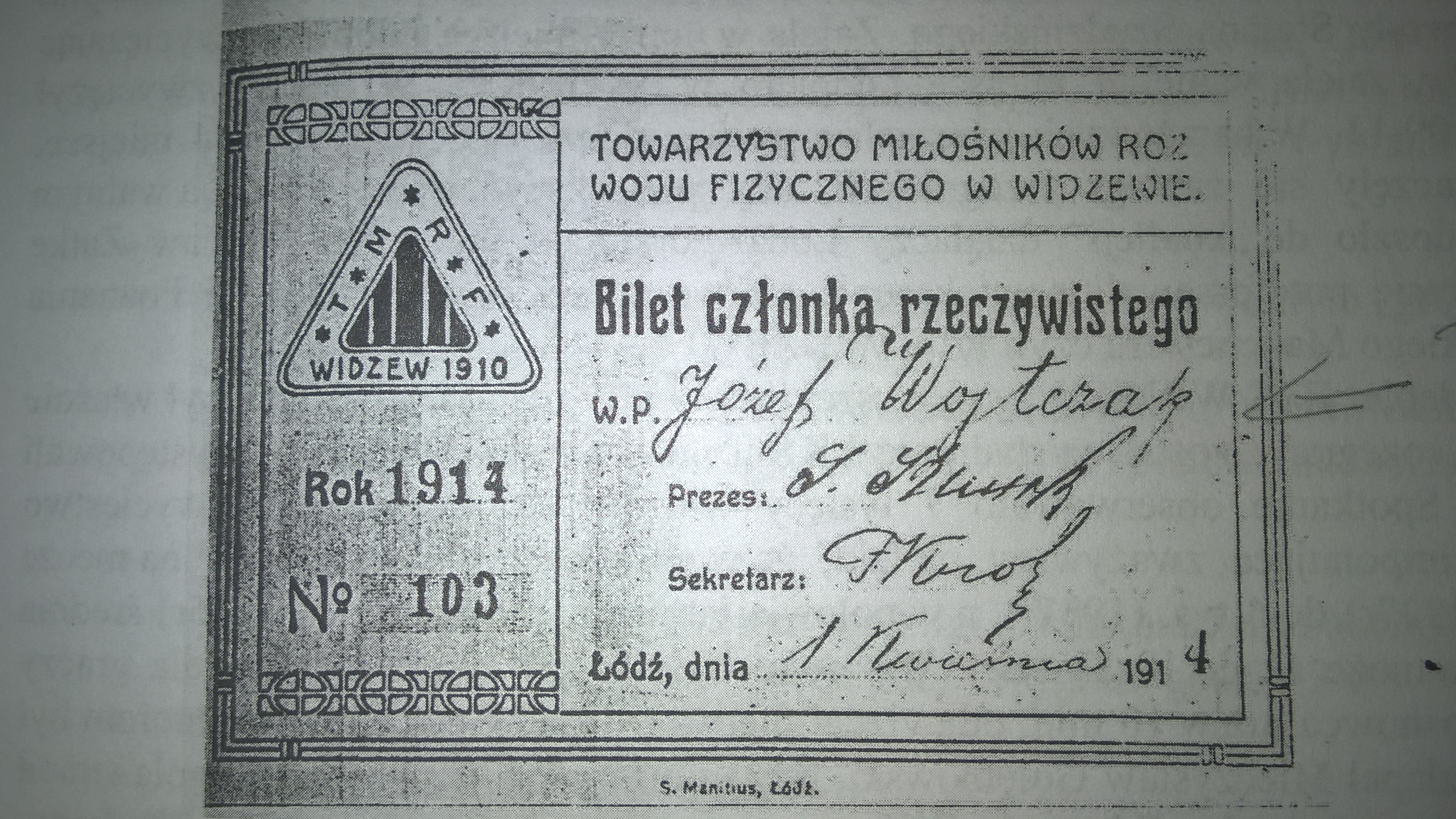
TMRF Widzew membership card from 1914

TMRF Widzew, the first club based in Widzew (district of Łódź), was formed on 25 November 1910 by Polish workers and German industrialists who were employees of the Widzew textile manufactory called WIMA. Initially, the club was called the Widzew Society of Physical Development Enthusiasts (in Polish: Towarzystwo Miłośników Rozwoju Fizycznego Widzew), - at that time Łódź was under the rule of the Russian Tsar, and the adjective "workers'" (in Polish: Robotniczy) could not be used in the club's name. After the First World War, Poland regained its independence and a separate entity was founded in 1922 under the name of Robotnicze Towarzystwo Sportowe Widzew Łódź (Workers' Sports Association Widzew Łódź). The club's mottos are "Together We Create Power" (in Polish Razem Tworzymy Siłę) and "Always 12" (in Polish Zawsze w 12), which suggests that its fans are the twelfth player of the team. The club plays its matches at the Widzew Łódź Stadium, located in Łódź at 138 Marshal Józef Piłsudski Avenue. The stadium bears the unofficial but commonly used name of the "Heart of Łódź" (in Polish Serce Łodzi).

During World War II, three pre-war players of Widzew Łódź, Joachim Schreer, Mirosław Wągrowski and Aleksander Żadziłko, were among Poles murdered by the Russians in the large Katyn massacre in April–May 1940.

Widzew is a four-time Polish league champion in seasons 1980–81, 1981–82, 1995–96 and 1996–97, as well as the winner of the 1985 Polish Cup.

After winning back-to-back championships in 1980–81 and 1981–82, Widzew reclaimed the league crown 14 years later after a record season once again. During the successful 1995–96 season, Widzew conceded only 22 goals in 34 matches, the least out of all teams in the league. They were also proficient in attack, scoring 84 goals and securing 88 points across the campaign. Thanks in part to the great performance of their goalkeeper Andrzej Woźniak, the team remained unbeaten for the whole season.

In the following 1996–97 season, the team enjoyed another great season. For the second time in the club's history, they secured back-to-back championships, scoring 74 goals across the season and conceding only 21.

They have appeared in 117 matches in European Cups, of which they won 42. Widzew knocked European giants Manchester United out of the 1980–81 UEFA Cup, although their biggest achievement was reaching the semi-final of the 1982–83 European Cup, eliminating then three-time winners Liverpool along the way.

=== Recent history ===
At the beginning of the 2007–08 season, Widzew was purchased by one of the wealthiest men in Poland, Sylwester Cacek.

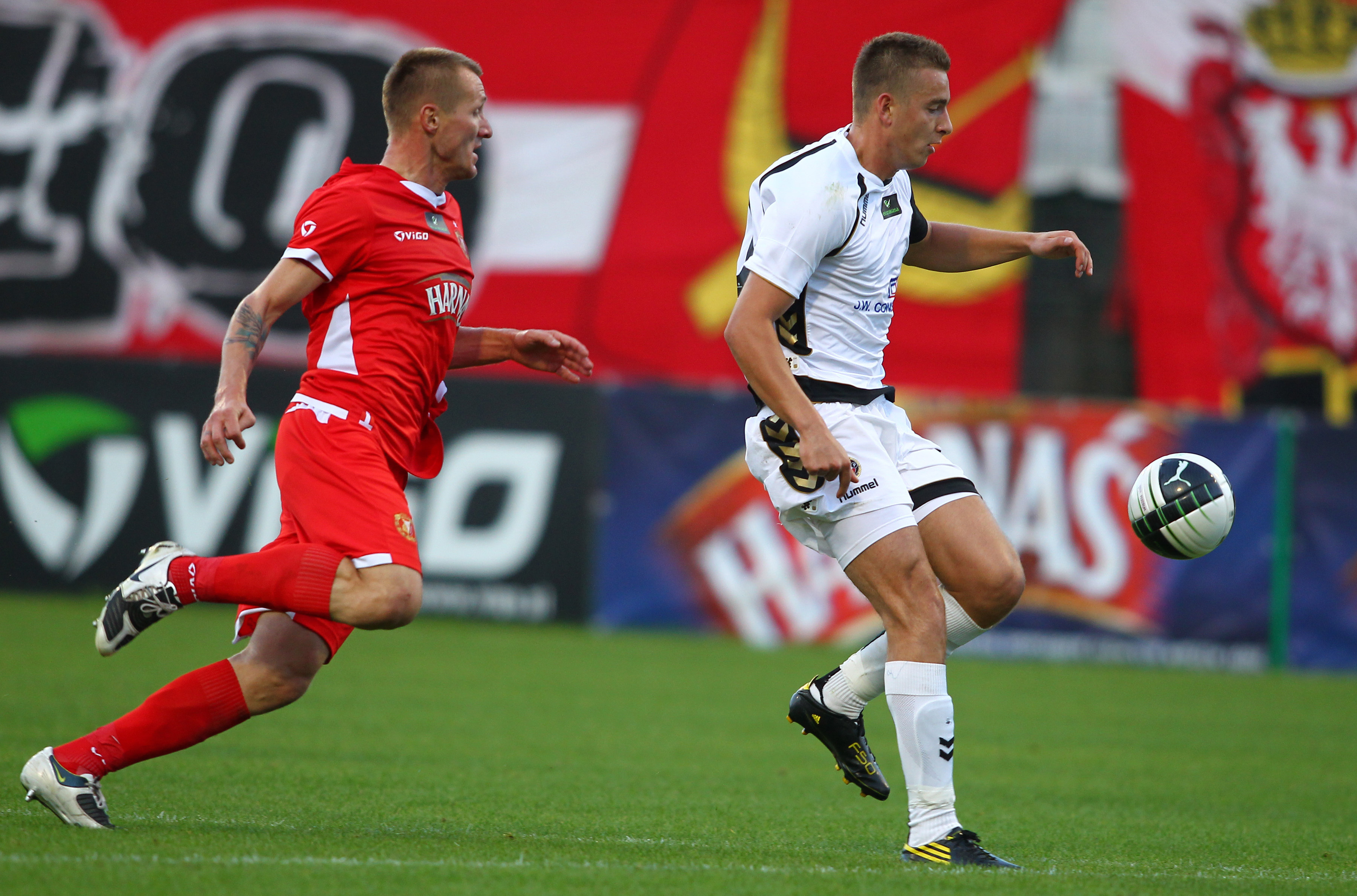
Home game with Polonia Warsaw in the 2010–11 Ekstraklasa

In January 2008, while playing in the second division, the Polish Football Association ruled that Widzew Łódź should be relegated due to their involvement in a corruption scandal. However, Widzew became champions that year and were allowed to stay in the second division, which was renamed I liga before the start of the 2008-09 season. Despite being deducted six points as a penalty, Widzew won the I Liga again in the 2009-10 season, and were promoted to the Ekstraklasa. However, Widzew were once again relegated at the end of the 2013–14 season after four seasons.

Due to financial problems, Widzew finished last at the end of the 2014–15 season, and subsequently went bankrupt.

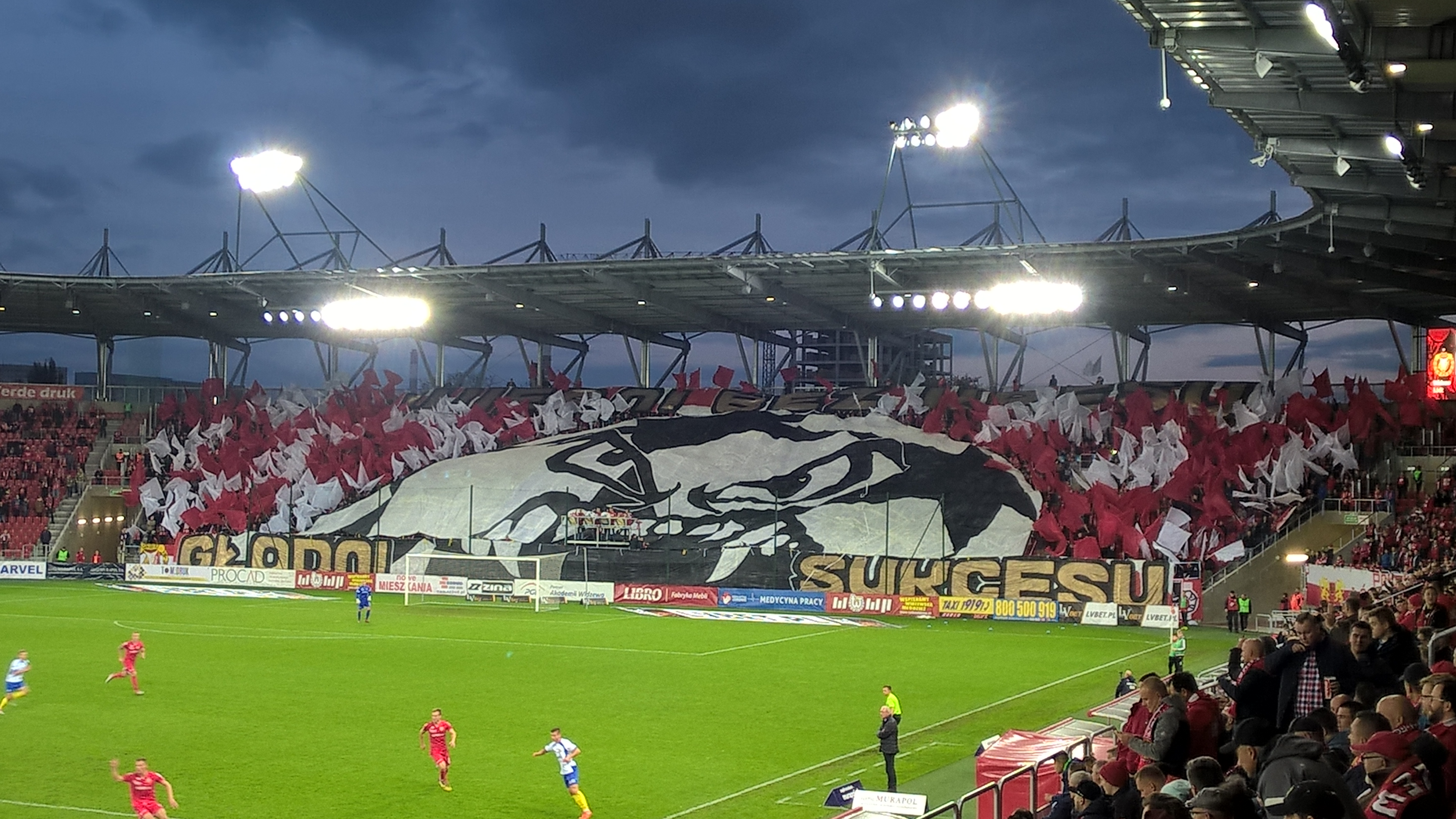
Home game with Tur Bielsk Podlaski in the 2017–18 III liga

Local businessmen Marcin Ferdzyn and Grzegorz Waranecki decided to take on amateur status as a new association called Stowarzyszenie Reaktywacja Tradycji Sportowych Widzew Łódź (Association of the Reactivation of the Sports Traditions of Widzew Łódź), which continues the tradition of the old RTS Widzew Łódź. The new association was registered in a Polish court on 2 July 2015, and within a few weeks of summer 2015, they managed to hire a new coach Witold Obarek and gather a new roster, which started the 2015–16 season in the fifth tier of Polish football. In their first season in IV liga, Widzew won promotion. In the 2016–17 season, Widzew achieved third place in III liga, behind Drwęca Nowe Miasto Lubawskie and ŁKS Łódź, but next season yielded promotion to II liga. In the 2018–19 season, they finished in fifth place with 55 points. In the 2021–22 season, Widzew finished 2nd, one point ahead of Arka Gdynia, and returned to Ekstraklasa for the first time since the 2013–14 season. They would finish 12th in the 2022–23 Ekstraklasa before improving to 9th in the following season. In the 2024–25 Ekstraklasa, they finished 13th before finishing 14th in the 2025–26 Ekstraklasa, with the recently hired Aleksandar Vuković guiding them out of relegation on the final match day with a 2-1 victory over Piast Gliwice.

== Honours ==
=== Domestic ===
==== League ====
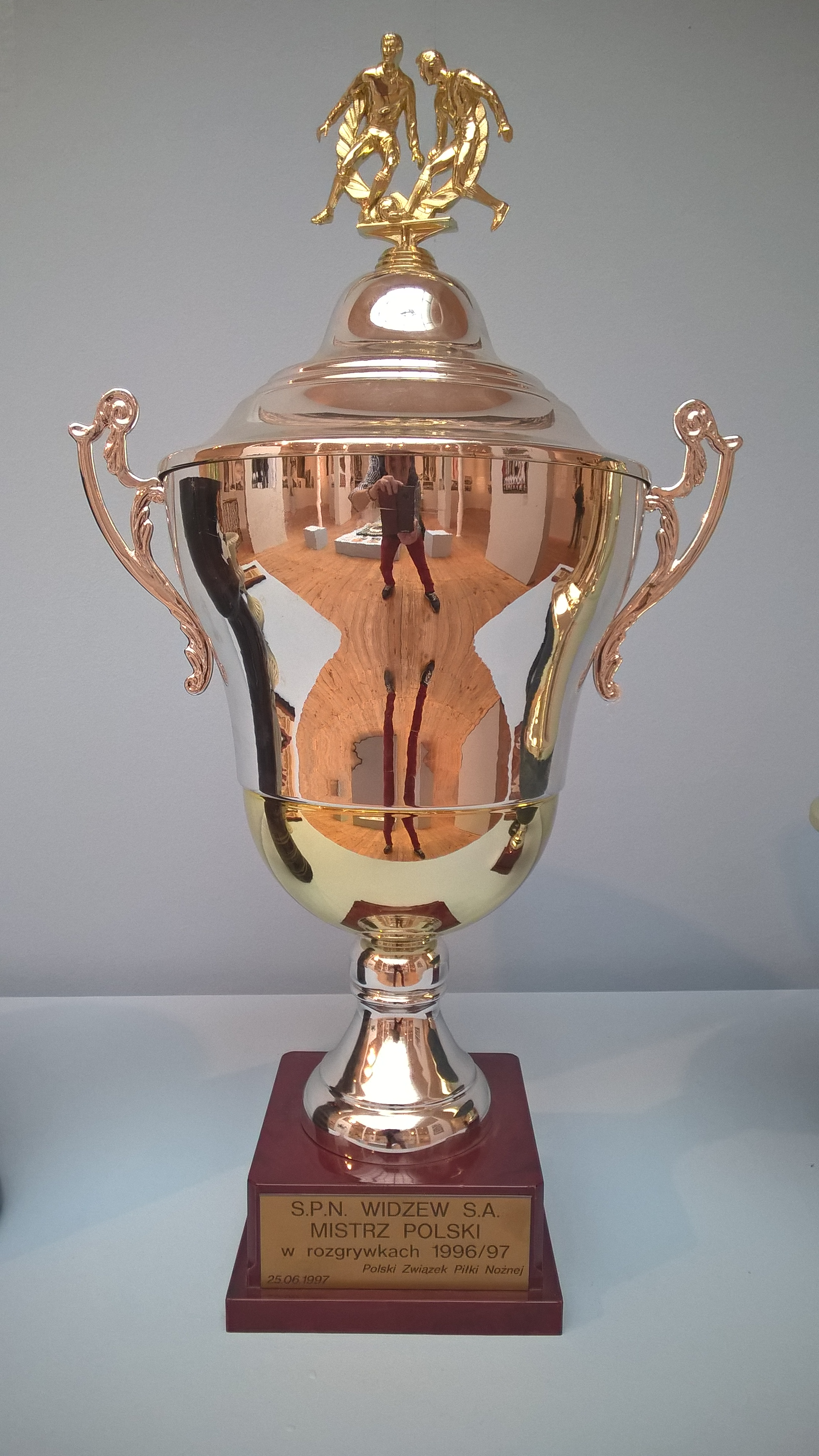
1996–97 Polish Championship trophy for Widzew

- Ekstraklasa (First Division)
  - Champions: 1980–81, 1981–82, 1995–96, 1996–97
  - Runners-up: 1976–77, 1978–79, 1979–80, 1982–83, 1983–84, 1994–95, 1998–99
- I liga (Second Division)
  - Champions: 2005–06, 2008–09, 2009–10

==== Cup ====
- Polish Cup
  - Winners: 1984–85
- Polish Super Cup
  - Winners: 1996
  - Runners-up: 1997
- Polish League Cup
  - Runners-up: 1977

=== Europe ===
- UEFA Champions League/European Cup
  - Semi-finalists: 1982–83
- Copa del Sol
  - Runners-up: 2013

=== Youth teams ===
- Polish U19 championship
  - Runners-up: 1995

== League history ==
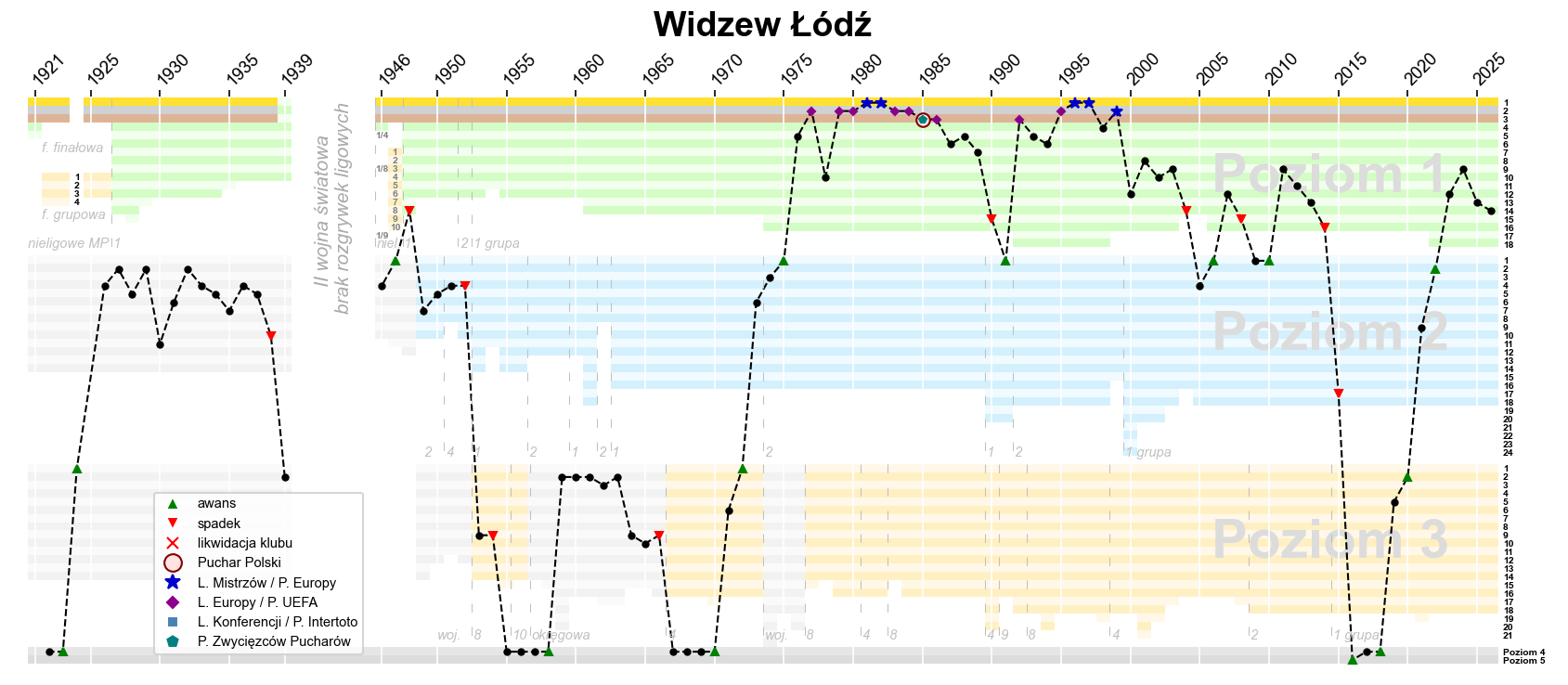
Chart of yearly table positions of Widzew in the Polish league system

| Tier | Seasons | First | Last | Promotions | Relegations | Most consecutive seasons |
|---|---|---|---|---|---|---|
| Ekstraklasa (tier 1) | 39 | 1948 | 2025–26 | ▲14 times to Europe | ▼5 | 15 (1975–1989) |
| Second tier | 28 | 1926 | 2021–22 | ▲5 | ▼3 | 13 (1926–1938) |
| Third tier | 17 | 1924 | 2019–20 | ▲3 | ▼2 | 8 (1959–1966) |
| Fourth tier | 11 | 1922 | 2017–18 | ▲4 | never | 4 (1955–1958, 1966–1970) |
| Fifth tier | 1 | 2015–16 | 2015–16 | ▲1 | never | 1 |

=== Results in Ekstraklasa ===
| | Season | Position | Matches | Points | Goals | W.-D.-L. |
|---|---|---|---|---|---|---|
| 1 | 1948 | 14 (relegation) | 26 | 13 pts. | 31–99 | 5–3–18 |
| 2 | 1975–76 | 5 | 30 | 32 pts. | 33–33 | 10–12–8 |
| 3 | 1976–77 | 2 | 30 | 38 pts. | 46–31 | 14–10–6 |
| 4 | 1977–78 | 10 | 30 | 28 pts. | 34–40 | 9–10–11 |
| 5 | 1978–79 | 2 | 30 | 39 pts. | 37–26 | 14–11–5 |
| 6 | 1979–80 | 2 | 30 | 36 pts. | 47–39 | 13–10–7 |
| 7 | 1980–81 | 1 | 30 | 39 pts. | 39–25 | 14–11–5 |
| 8 | 1981–82 | 1 | 30 | 39 pts. | 45–31 | 14–11–5 |
| 9 | 1982–83 | 2 | 30 | 38 pts. | 50–30 | 13–12–5 |
| 10 | 1983–84 | 2 | 30 | 42 pts. | 43–25 | 15–12–3 |
| 11 | 1984–85 | 3 | 30 | 38 pts. | 34–16 | 13–12–5 |
| 12 | 1985–86 | 3 | 30 | 41 pts. | 40–25 | 15–11–4 |
| 13 | 1986–87 | 6 | 30 | 36 pts. | 34–29 | 14–7–9 |
| 14 | 1987–88 | 5 | 30 | 31 pts. | 28–24 | 8–15–7 |
| 15 | 1988–89 | 7 | 30 | 29 pts. | 27–27 | 9–12–9 |
| 16 | 1989–90 | 15 (relegation) | 30 | 17 pts. | 22–39 | 4–12–14 |
| 17 | 1991–92 | 3 | 34 | 43 pts. | 48–28 | 17–9–8 |
| 18 | 1992–93 | 5 | 34 | 43 pts. | 60–42 | 16–11–7 |
| 19 | 1993–94 | 6 | 34 | 39 pts. | 45–33 | 12–15–7 |
| 20 | 1994–95 | 2 | 34 | 45 pts. | 48–25 | 17–11–6 |
| 21 | 1995–96 | 1 | 34 | 88 pts. | 84–22 | 27–7–0 |
| 22 | 1996–97 | 1 | 34 | 81 pts. | 74–20 | 25–6–3 |
| 23 | 1997–98 | 4 | 34 | 61 pts. | 53–34 | 18–7–9 |
| 24 | 1998–99 | 2 | 30 | 56 pts. | 50–33 | 18–2–10 |
| 25 | 1999–2000 | 7 | 30 | 40 pts. | 48–54 | 11–7–12 |
| 26 | 2000–01 | 12 | 30 | 36 pts. | 33–40 | 9–9–12 |
| 27 | 2001–02 | | | | | |
| | Autumn round – group A: | 8 | 14 | 11 pts. | 9–24 | 3–2–9 |
| | Spring round – g. relegation: | 2 | 14 | 31 pts. | 19–8 | 6–7–1 |
| 28 | 2002–03 | 9 | 30 | 37 pts. | 29–39 | 10–7–13 |
| 29 | 2003–04 | 14 (relegation) | 26 | 19 pts. | 25–52 | 4–7–15 |
| 30 | 2006–07 | 12 | 30 | 28 pts. | 27–48 | 7–7–16 |
| 31 | 2007–08 | 15 (relegation) | 30 | 26 pts. | 27–42 | 5–11–14 |
| 32 | 2010–11 | 9 | 30 | 43 pts. | 41–34 | 11–10–9 |
| 33 | 2011–12 | 11 | 30 | 39 pts. | 25–26 | 9–12–9 |
| 34 | 2012–13 | 13 | 30 | 33 pts. | 30–41 | 8–9–13 |
| 35 | 2013–14 | 15 (relegation) | 37 | 22 pts. | 36–59 | 8–9–20 |
| 36 | 2022–23 | 12 | 34 | 41 pts. | 38–47 | 11–8–15 |
| 37 | 2023–24 | 9 | 34 | 46 pts. | 45–46 | 13–7–14 |
| 38 | 2024–25 | 13 | 34 | 40 pts. | 38–49 | 11–7–16 |
| 39 | 2025–26 | 14 | 34 | 42 pts. | 41–41 | 12–6–16 |

== Widzew in Europe ==
| Season | Competition | Round | Club | Score |
|---|---|---|---|---|
| 1977–78 | UEFA Cup | 1R | (England) Manchester City | 2–2, 0–0 |
| | | 2R | (Netherlands) PSV Eindhoven | 3–5, 0–1 |
| 1979–80 | UEFA Cup | 1R | (France) AS Saint-Étienne | 2–1, 0–3 |
| 1980–81 | UEFA Cup | 1R | (England) Manchester United | 1–1, 0–0 |
| | | 2R | (Italy) Juventus FC | 3–1, 1–3 p. 4–1 |
| | | 3R | (England) Ipswich Town | 0–5, 1–0 |
| 1981–82 | European Cup | 1R | (Belgium) RSC Anderlecht | 1–4, 1–2 |
| 1982–83 | European Cup | 1R | (Malta) Hibernians FC | 4–1, 3–1 |
| | | 2R | (Austria) SK Rapid Wien | 1–2, 5–3 |
| | | 1/4F | (England) Liverpool F.C. | 2–0, 2–3 |
| | | 1/2F | (Italy) Juventus FC | 0–2, 2–2 |
| 1983–84 | UEFA Cup | 1R | (Sweden) IF Elfsborg | 0–0, 2–2 |
| | | 2R | (Czechoslovakia) Sparta Prague | 1–0, 0–3 |
| 1984–85 | UEFA Cup | 1R | (Denmark) Aarhus Gymnastik Forening | 2–0, 0–1 |
| | | 2R | (West Germany) Borussia Mönchengladbach | 2–3, 1–0 |
| | | 3R | (Soviet Union) FC Dinamo Minsk | 0–2, 1–0 |
| 1985–86 | European Cup Winners' Cup | 1R | (Turkey) Galatasaray SK | 0–1, 2–1 |
| 1986–87 | UEFA Cup | 1R | (Austria) LASK Linz | 1–1, 1–0 |
| | | 2R | (West Germany) Bayer 05 Uerdingen | 0–0, 0–2 |
| 1992–93 | UEFA Cup | 1R | (Germany) Eintracht Frankfurt | 2–2, 0–9 |
| 1995–96 | UEFA Cup | Q | (Wales) Bangor City FC | 4–0, 1–0 |
| | | 1R | (Ukraine) FC Chornomorets Odesa | 1–0, 0–1 p. 5–6 |
| 1996–97 | UEFA Champions League | Q | (Denmark) Brøndby IF | 2–1, 2–3 |
| | | GR | (Germany) Borussia Dortmund | 1–2, 2–2 |
| | | GR | (Spain) Atlético Madrid | 1–4, 0–1 |
| | | GR | (Romania) Steaua București | 0–1, 2–0 |
| 1997–98 | UEFA Champions League | 1Q | (Azerbaijan) Neftchi Baku | 2–0, 8–0 |
| | | 2Q | (Italy) Parma FC | 1–3, 0–4 |
| | UEFA Cup | 1R | (Italy) Udinese Calcio | 1–0, 0–3 |
| 1999–00 | UEFA Champions League | 2Q | (Bulgaria) Litex Lovech | 4–1, 1–4 p. 3–2 |
| | | 3Q | (Italy) ACF Fiorentina | 1–3, 0–2 |
| | UEFA Cup | 1R | (Latvia) Skonto FC | 0–1, 2–0 |
| | | 2R | (France) AS Monaco FC | 1–1, 0–2 |

=== Best results in European competitions ===
| Season | Achievement | Notes |
European Cup
| 1982–83 | Semi-final | lost to (Italy) Juventus 0–2 in Turin, 2–2 in Łódź |
UEFA Cup
| 1980–81 | Round of 16 | lost to (England) Ipswich Town 0–5 in Ipswich, 1–0 in Łódź |
| 1984–85 | Round of 16 | lost to (Soviet Union) Dinamo Minsk 0–2 in Łódź, 1–0 in Tbilisi |

== Players ==
=== Current squad ===
As of 13 September 2026

Note: Flags indicate national team as defined under FIFA eligibility rules; some limited exceptions apply. Players may hold more than one non-FIFA nationality.

| No. | Pos. | Nation | Player |
|---|---|---|---|
| 1 | GK | POL | Bartłomiej Drągowski (vice-captain) |
| 2 | DF | ESP | Carlos Isaac |
| 3 | DF | COD | Steve Kapuadi |
| 4 | DF | POL | Mateusz Żyro |
| 5 | MF | GRE | Giannis Papanikolaou |
| 6 | MF | ALB | Juljan Shehu (captain) |
| 7 | MF | POL | Mariusz Fornalczyk |
| 8 | MF | DEN | Emil Kornvig |
| 10 | MF | ESP | Fran Álvarez |
| 14 | DF | ESP | Ricardo Visus |
| 17 | DF | NOR | Christopher Cheng |
| 18 | MF | ALB | Lindon Selahi |
| 19 | FW | SUI | Darian Maleš |
| 20 | FW | CAN | Antoni Klukowski |
| 21 | MF | DEN | Lukas Lerager |

| No. | Pos. | Nation | Player |
|---|---|---|---|
| 25 | DF | POL | Przemysław Wiśniewski |
| 28 | FW | POL | Karol Świderski |
| 30 | GK | SRB | Veljko Ilić |
| 33 | GK | POL | Jan Krzywański |
| 40 | DF | ESP | Mario García |
| 48 | GK | POL | Franciszek Golański |
| 55 | MF | POL | Szymon Czyż |
| 70 | DF | BIH | Jusuf Gazibegović (on loan from 1. FC Köln) |
| 79 | FW | CRO | Stipe Biuk |
| 80 | MF | POR | Dani Silva (on loan from Midtjylland) |
| 90 | FW | ROU | Ioan Vermeșan (on loan from Hellas Verona) |
| 91 | DF | POL | Marcel Krajewski |
| 98 | FW | BRA | Paulinho Bóia |
| 99 | FW | POL | Sebastian Bergier |

=== Out on loan ===
Note: Flags indicate national team as defined under FIFA eligibility rules; some limited exceptions apply. Players may hold more than one non-FIFA nationality.

| No. | Pos. | Nation | Player |
|---|---|---|---|
| 9 | FW | SUI | Andi Zeqiri (at Standard Liège until 30 June 2027) |
| 19 | MF | CRO | Tonio Teklić (at Mardin 1969 until 30 June 2027) |
| 46 | MF | POL | Kuba Nawrocki (at Stal Stalowa Wola until 30 June 2027) |
| 57 | MF | NGR | Samuel Akere (at Wisła Płock until 31 May 2027) |
| 78 | MF | POL | Kamil Cybulski (at Stal Mielec until 30 June 2027) |

| No. | Pos. | Nation | Player |
|---|---|---|---|
| 98 | GK | POL | Maciej Kikolski (at GKS Katowice until 30 June 2027) |
| — | DF | CYP | Stelios Andreou (at Estoril until 30 June 2027) |
| — | FW | GHA | Osman Bukari (at Red Star Belgrade until 30 June 2027) |
| — | DF | POL | Paweł Kwiatkowski (at Warta Poznań until 31 December 2026) |

=== Retired numbers ===
Note: Flags indicate national team as defined under FIFA eligibility rules; some limited exceptions apply. Players may hold more than one non-FIFA nationality.

| No. | Pos. | Nation | Player |
|---|---|---|---|
| 11 | FW | POL | Włodzimierz Smolarek (1974–78, 1980–86 - posthumous honour) |

=== Notable players ===
- (Poland) Tadeusz Błachno
- (Poland) Daniel Bogusz
- (Poland) Henryk Bolesta
- (Germany) Uli Borowka
- (Poland) Zbigniew Boniek
- (Poland) Stanisław Burzyński
- (Poland) Wiesław Cisek
- (Poland) Marek Citko
- (Poland) Ryszard Czerwiec
- (Poland) Karol Czubak
- (Poland) Jacek Dembiński
- (Poland) Bartłomiej Drągowski
- (Poland) Dariusz Dziekanowski
- (Poland) Marek Dziuba
- (Poland) Dariusz Gęsior
- (Poland) Andrzej Grębosz
- (Poland) Rafał Grzelak
- (Poland) Leszek Iwanicki
- (Poland) Paweł Janas
- (Poland) Waldemar Jaskulski
- (Poland) Tomasz Łapiński
- (Poland) Sławomir Majak
- (Poland) Radosław Michalski
- (Poland) Józef Młynarczyk
- (Poland) Andrzej Możejko
- (Poland) Arkadiusz Onyszko
- (Poland) Kazimierz Przybyś
- (Poland) Rafał Siadaczka
- (Poland) Włodzimierz Smolarek
- (Poland) Michał Stasiak
- (Poland) Tadeusz Świątek
- (Poland) Maciej Szczęsny
- (Poland) Mirosław Szymkowiak
- (Poland) Karol Świderski
- (Poland) Mirosław Tłokiński
- (Poland) Artur Wichniarek
- (Poland) Jerzy Wijas
- (Poland) Przemysław Wiśniewski
- (Poland) Roman Wójcicki
- (Poland) Paweł Wojtala
- (Poland) Andrzej Woźniak
- (Poland) Wiesław Wraga
- (Poland) Zbigniew Wyciszkiewicz
- (Poland) Marcin Zając
- (Poland) Władysław Żmuda
- (Ukraine) Andriy Mikhalchuk
- (Moldova) Alexandru Curtianu

== Managers ==
- (Poland) Zygmunt Otto (1948)
- (Socialist Federal Republic of Yugoslavia) Vančo Kaménař (1948)
- (Poland) Wacław Pegza (1949)
- (Poland) Władysław Król (1950–51)
- (Poland) Leszek Jezierski (1969–76)
- (Poland) Janusz Pekowski (1976)
- (Poland) Paweł Kowalski (1976–77)
- (Poland) Bronisław Waligóra (1977–78)
- (Poland) Stanisław Świerk (1979)
- (Poland) Jacek Machciński (1979–81)
- (Poland) Władysław Jan Żmuda (1981–84)
- (Poland) Bronisław Waligóra (1984–86)
- (Poland) Orest Lenczyk (1987–88)
- (Poland) Andrzej Grębosz (1988)
- (Poland) Bronisław Waligóra (1988–90)
- (Poland) Jan Tomaszewski (1990)
- (Poland) Czesław Fudalej (1990)
- (Poland) Paweł Kowalski (1990–92)
- (Poland) Władysław Jan Żmuda (1992)
- (Poland) Leszek Jezierski (1993)
- (Poland) Marek Woziński (1993)
- (Poland) Władysław Stachurski (1993–95)
- (Poland) Ryszard Polak (1995)
- (Poland) Franciszek Smuda (1995–98)
- (Poland) Andrzej Pyrdoł (1998)
- (Poland) Wojciech Łazarek (1998)
- (Poland) Marek Dziuba (1999)
- (Poland) Grzegorz Lato (1999)
- (Poland) Orest Lenczyk (1999–2000)
- (Poland) Andrzej Pyrdoł (caretaker) (2000)
- (Poland) Jan Żurek (2000)
- (Ukraine) Petro Kushlyk (2000–01)
- (Poland) Marek Koniarek (2001)
- (Poland) Marek Kusto (2001)
- (Poland) Dariusz Wdowczyk (2001–02)
- (Poland) Franciszek Smuda (2002)
- (Czech Republic) Petr Němec (2002–03)
- (Poland) Tomasz Muchiński (caretaker) (2003)
- (Poland) Franciszek Smuda (2003)
- (Poland) Andrzej Kretek (2003)
- (Poland) Tomasz Łapiński (caretaker) (2003)
- (Poland) Jerzy Kasalik (2003–04)
- (Poland) Tomasz Łapiński (caretaker) (2004)
- (Poland) Stefan Majewski (2004–06)
- (Poland) Michał Probierz (2006–07)
- (Poland) Marek Zub (2007–08)
- (Poland) Janusz Wójcik (2008)
- (Poland) Waldemar Fornalik (2008–09)
- (Poland) Paweł Janas (2009–10)
- (Poland) Andrzej Kretek (2010)
- (Poland) Czesław Michniewicz (2010–11)
- (Poland) Radosław Mroczkowski (2011–13)
- (Poland) Rafal Pawlak (2013–14)
- (Poland) Artur Skowronek (2014)
- (Poland) Włodzimierz Tylak (2014)
- (Poland) Rafał Pawlak (2014)
- (Poland) Wojciech Stawowy (2014–15)
- (Poland) Witold Obarek (2015)
- (Poland) Marcin Płuska (2015–16)
- (Poland) Tomasz Muchiński (2016)
- (Poland) Przemysław Cecherz (2016–17)
- (Poland) Franciszek Smuda (2017–18)
- (Poland) Radosław Mroczkowski (2018–19)
- (Poland) Jacek Paszulewicz (2019)
- (Poland) Zbigniew Smółka (2019)
- (Poland) Marcin Kaczmarek (2019–20)
- (Albania) Enkeleid Dobi (2020–21)
- (Poland) Marcin Broniszewski (2021)
- (Poland) Janusz Niedźwiedź (2021–23)
- (Poland) Daniel Myśliwiec (2023–25)
- (Poland) Patryk Czubak (caretaker) (2025)
- (Croatia) Željko Sopić (2025)
- (Poland) Patryk Czubak (2025)
- (Croatia) Igor Jovićević (2025–26)
- (Serbia) Aleksandar Vuković (2026)
- (Poland) Mateusz Stolarski (2026–present)

== Stadium ==
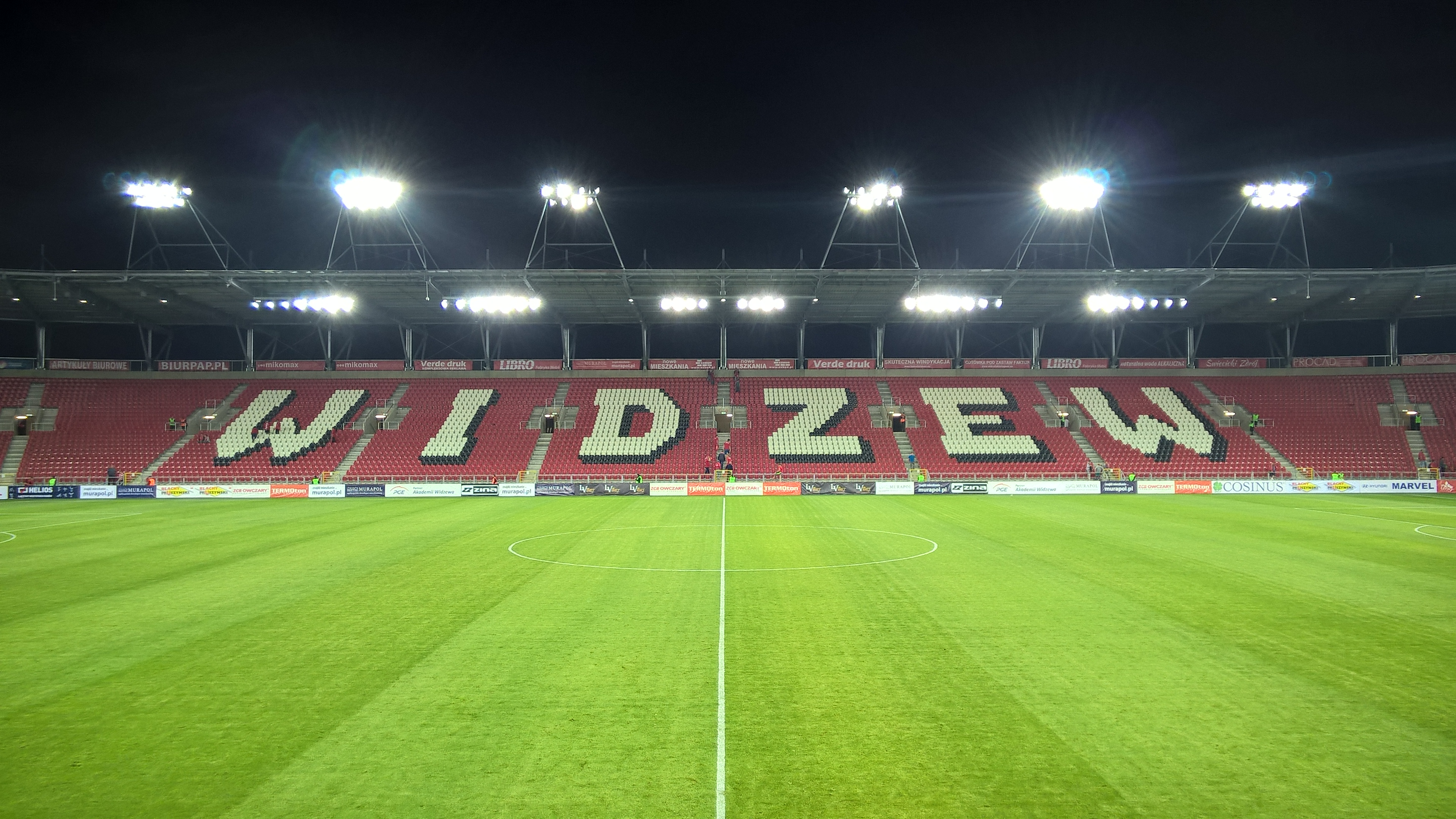
Widzew Łódź Stadium

The club's home stadium was the Municipal Stadium (Polish: Stadion Miejski) opened in 1930. The stadium, which was owned by the city of Łódź, had a capacity of 10,500 seats. In early 2015, it was demolished to make way for a new stadium with 18,000 seats. It was intended the new stadium would be completed by November 2016.

In the 2014–15 season, Widzew played their home matches in Byczyna near Poddębice, 40 km west of Łódź.

After bankruptcy and relegation to the fifth division, a rebuilt team was forced to play its domestic games in Łódź at UKS SMS Łódź stadium, during the construction of a new Widzew Łódź Stadium.

The first match at their new stadium was played on 18 March 2017, where Widzew won 2–0 against Motor Lubawa. 17,443 fans attended the game.

== Fans ==
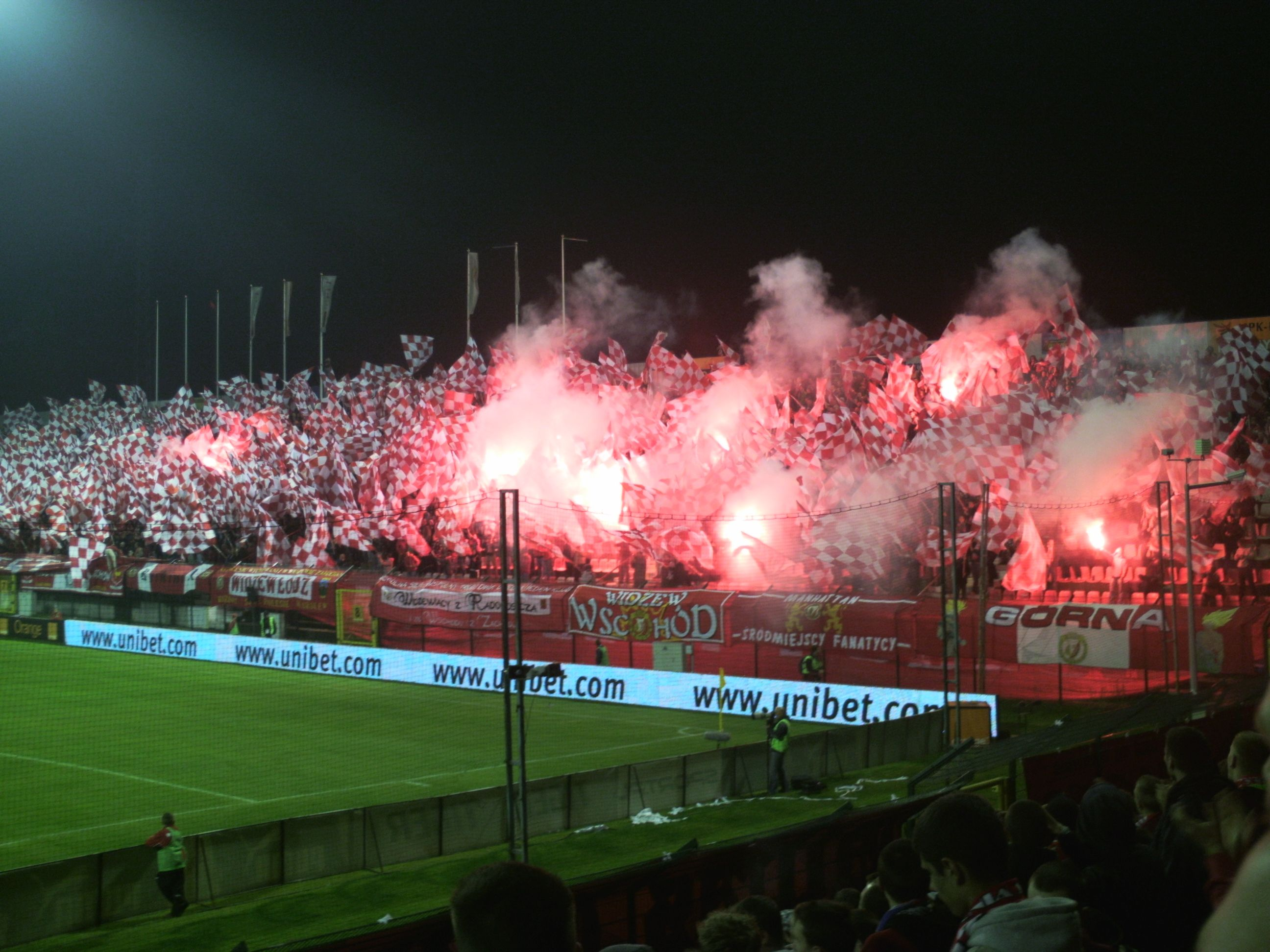
Ultras of Widzew during a derby match against ŁKS Łódź in the 2007–08 Ekstraklasa

Widzew has one of the largest fan-bases in Poland with fan-clubs all around the country. Widzew's biggest rival is ŁKS Łódź, with whom they contest the Łódź Derby. Legia Warsaw are also big rivals, with whom they contest the Derby of Poland, which stems from the fact there were frequent title races between the two clubs. Their fans maintain friendly relations with fans of Ruch Chorzów, Elana Toruń, KKS Kalisz, Wisła Kraków and Pogoń Szczecin. A little group of ultras has a friendship with Hungarian side Honvéd, due to the Hungary–Poland relations.

== TMRF Widzew Łódź ==
TMRF Widzew was a football team created by the active supporters of Widzew in 2014, who were in a long conflict with the club board. Only Widzew supporters were admitted to the squad.

== See also ==
- Football in Poland
- List of football teams
