= Bogusław Cygan =

Polish footballer

Personal information
- Date of birth: 2 November 1964
- Place of birth: Ruda Śląska, Poland
- Date of death: 15 January 2018 (aged 53)
- Place of death: Poland
- Height: 1.73 m (5 ft 8 in)
- Position: Forward

Youth career
- 1978–1979: Urania Ruda Śląska
- 1979–1982: Szombierki Bytom

Senior career*
Years	Team	Apps	(Gls)
1982–1983	Szombierki Bytom	0	(0)
1983–1984	Urania Ruda Śląska		
1984–1989	Szombierki Bytom		
1989–1990	Górnik Zabrze	28	(2)
1990–1991	Polonia Bytom		
1991–1992	Szombierki Bytom		
1992–1993	Górnik Zabrze	30	(11)
1993	Lausanne Sport	12	(1)
1994–1996	Stal Mielec	89	(37)
1996–1997	Śląsk Wrocław	14	(2)
1997–1998	Polonia/Szombierki Bytom		
1999	Polonia Łaziska Górne		
1999–2002	Odra Miasteczko Śląskie		

Managerial career
- Odra Miasteczko Śląskie
- LKS Żyglin
- * Club domestic league appearances and goals

Bogusław Cygan (3 November 1964 – 15 January 2018) was a Polish professional footballer who played as a forward. Cygan was the Ekstraklasa top scorer in the 1994–95 season. After he retired, he became a coach.

== Honours ==
Individual

- Ekstraklasa top scorer: 1994–95
