= Marek Koniarek =

Polish footballer (born 1962)

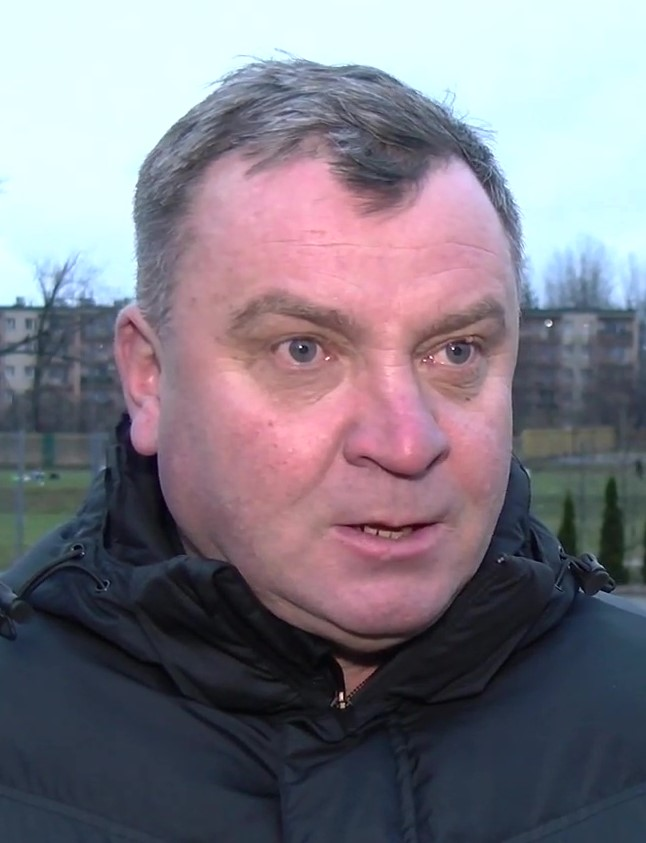

Personal information
- Full name: Marek Krzysztof Koniarek
- Date of birth: 29 May 1962 (age 64)
- Place of birth: Katowice, Poland
- Height: 1.78 m (5 ft 10 in)
- Position: Forward

Youth career
- Siemianowiczanka
- Instal 22 Katowice

Senior career*
Years	Team	Apps	(Gls)
1982–1984	Szombierki Bytom	21	(3)
1984–1988	GKS Katowice	106	(29)
1988–1991	Rot-Weiss Essen	36	(4)
1991	Zagłębie Sosnowiec	13	(4)
1992–1993	Widzew Łódź	68	(35)
1994	Wiener Sport-Club	16	(6)
1994–1995	VSE St. Pölten	16	(8)
1995–1996	Widzew Łódź	38	(30)
1996–1997	Vorwärts Steyr	5	(1)
1997–1998	Wisła Kraków	12	(0)
1998–1999	GKS Katowice	13	(3)
Total		346	(123)

International career
1986–1987	Poland	2	(1)

Managerial career
- 1998–1999: GKS Katowice
- 2000: Włókniarz Kietrz
- 2000–2001: Widzew Łódź
- 2001–2002: Ruch Radzionków
- 2004–2005: Rozwój Katowice
- 2005: Górnik Polkowice
- 2007: Rozwój Katowice
- 2008: Górnik 09 Mysłowice
- 2010–2011: LZS Piotrówka
- 2012: Hetman Katowice
- 2013: Rozwój Katowice (caretaker)
- 2015: Rozwój Katowice
- 2017: Rozwój Katowice
- 2018: ROW 1964 Rybnik
- 2018–2019: Rozwój Katowice
- * Club domestic league appearances and goals

Marek Krzysztof Koniarek (born 29 May 1962) is a Polish former professional footballer who played as a forward. He was the Ekstraklasa top goalscorer in the 1995–96 season.

== Honours ==
=== Player ===
GKS Katowice

- Polish Cup: 1985–86

Widzew Łódź

- Ekstraklasa: 1995–96
- Polish Super Cup: 1996

Individual

- Ekstraklasa top scorer: 1995–96
- Polish Newcomer of the Year: 1986

=== Managerial ===
Górnik 09 Mysłowice

- Regional league Katowice II: 2007–08
