= Tomasz Wieszczycki =

Polish footballer

Personal information
- Full name: Tomasz Witold Wieszczycki
- Date of birth: 21 December 1971 (age 54)
- Place of birth: Łódź, Poland
- Height: 1.81 m (5 ft 11 in)
- Position: Midfielder

Senior career*
| Years | Team | Apps | (Gls) |
| 1988–1995 | ŁKS Łódź | 190 | (47) |
| 1995–1996 | Legia Warsaw | 31 | (18) |
| 1996–1997 | Le Havre | 35 | (2) |
| 1998–1999 | ŁKS Łódź | 58 | (13) |
| 2000–2001 | Polonia Warsaw | 34 | (12) |
| 2001 | OFI | 6 | (0) |
| 2002–2004 | Dyskobolia Grodzisk | 50 | (9) |
| Total | | 404 | (101) |

International career
- Poland Olympic
| 1994–2000 | Poland | 11 | (3) |

Managerial career
- 2011: ŁKS Łódź (interim)
Medal record
Representing Poland
Men's football
Olympic Games
| Silver medal – second place | 1992 Barcelona | Team |
- * Club domestic league appearances and goals

Tomasz Witold Wieszczycki (born 21 December 1971) is a Polish football pundit, co-commentator and former player who played as a midfielder.

== Career ==
=== National team ===
Wieszczycki appeared in 11 matches for the Poland national team, scoring three goals.

== Honours ==
ŁKS Łódź

- Ekstraklasa: 1997–98

Polonia Warsaw

- Ekstraklasa: 1999–2000
- Polish Cup: 2000–01
- Polish League Cup: 1999–2000
- Polish Super Cup: 2000

Poland Olympic

- Olympic silver medal: 1992

Individual

- Ekstraklasa Hall of Fame: 2026
