= Krzysztof Bukalski =

Polish footballer

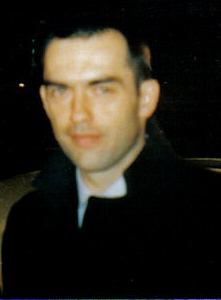

Personal information
- Date of birth: 22 September 1970 (age 56)
- Place of birth: Kraków, Poland
- Height: 1.80 m (5 ft 11 in)
- Position: Midfielder

Youth career
- Wanda Nowa Huta

Senior career*
Years	Team	Apps	(Gls)
1987–1996	Hutnik Kraków		
1996–1997	Genk	46	(5)
1998–2001	Wisła Kraków	36	(2)
2000–2001	→ GKS Katowice (loan)	17	(1)
2002	Fiorenzuola		
2002–2003	Nea Salamis	19	(4)
2003–2007	Górnik Zabrze	88	(8)

Managerial career
- 2009: Kmita Zabierzów
- 2010: Przebój Wolbrom
- 2011: Lotnik Kryspinów
- 2011–2012: Garbarnia Kraków
- 2013–2014: Dalin Myślenice
- * Club domestic league appearances and goals

Krzysztof Bukalski is a Polish former professional football manager and player who played as a midfielder.

He represented the Poland national team from 1995 to 1998, with his debut taking place on 15 March 1995 in Ostrowiec Świętokrzyski in a 4–1 win over Lithuania. In total, he earned 17 caps and scored twice for the national team.

== Honours ==
Wisła Kraków

- Ekstraklasa: 1998–99
