= 1995–96 Ekstraklasa =

69th season of top-tier football league in Poland

Liga
- Season: 1995–96
- Champions: Widzew Łódź (3rd title)
- Relegated: Pogoń Szczecin; Olimpia/Lechia Gdańsk; Stal Mielec; Siarka Tarnobrzeg
- Matches: 304
- Goals: 786 (2.59 per match)
- Top goalscorer: Marek Koniarek (29 goals)
- Average attendance: 4,264 ▲1.2%

Statistics of Ekstraklasa for the 1995–96 season.

== Overview ==
18 teams competed in the 1995–96 season with Widzew Łódź winning the championship unbeaten.

== League table ==
| Pos | Team | Pld | W | D | L | GF | GA | GD | Pts | Qualification or relegation |
|---|---|---|---|---|---|---|---|---|---|---|
| 1 | Widzew Łódź (C) | 34 | 27 | 7 | 0 | 84 | 22 | +62 | 88 | Qualification to Champions League qualifying round |
| 2 | Legia Warsaw | 34 | 27 | 4 | 3 | 95 | 22 | +73 | 85 | Qualification to UEFA Cup preliminary round |
| 3 | Hutnik Kraków | 34 | 15 | 7 | 12 | 48 | 43 | +5 | 52 | Qualification to UEFA Cup preliminary round |
| 4 | ŁKS Łódź | 34 | 13 | 10 | 11 | 44 | 38 | +6 | 49 | Qualification to Intertoto Cup group stage |
| 5 | Amica Wronki | 34 | 13 | 9 | 12 | 35 | 37 | −2 | 48 | |
| 6 | Stomil Olsztyn | 34 | 13 | 7 | 14 | 32 | 41 | −9 | 46 | |
| 7 | Lech Poznań | 34 | 11 | 12 | 11 | 45 | 40 | +5 | 45 | |
| 8 | Raków Częstochowa | 34 | 12 | 8 | 14 | 33 | 36 | −3 | 44 | |
| 9 | Sokół Pniewy/Tychy | 34 | 11 | 11 | 12 | 36 | 40 | −4 | 44 | |
| 10 | Zagłębie Lubin | 34 | 11 | 11 | 12 | 34 | 35 | −1 | 44 | Qualification to Intertoto Cup group stage |
| 11 | GKS Katowice | 34 | 11 | 10 | 13 | 36 | 37 | −1 | 43 | |
| 12 | Górnik Zabrze | 34 | 10 | 13 | 11 | 45 | 52 | −7 | 43 | |
| 13 | GKS Bełchatów | 34 | 12 | 6 | 16 | 40 | 54 | −14 | 42 | |
| 14 | Śląsk Wrocław | 34 | 9 | 15 | 10 | 39 | 41 | −2 | 42 | |
| 15 | Pogoń Szczecin (R) | 34 | 11 | 9 | 14 | 33 | 41 | −8 | 42 | Relegated to II liga |
| 16 | Olimpia/Lechia Gdańsk (R) | 34 | 11 | 7 | 16 | 39 | 59 | −20 | 40 | Relegated to II liga |
| 17 | Stal Mielec (R) | 34 | 8 | 4 | 22 | 33 | 67 | −34 | 28 | Relegated to II liga |
| 18 | Siarka Tarnobrzeg (R) | 34 | 3 | 6 | 25 | 24 | 70 | −46 | 15 | Relegated to II liga |

Source: 90minut.pl (in Polish)
(C) Champions; (R) Relegated

== Results ==
| Home \ Away | AMC | BEŁ | KAT | GÓR | HUT | LPO | LEG | ŁKS | OLG | POG | RAK | SIA | TYC | STA | STO | ŚLĄ | WID | ZLU |
|---|---|---|---|---|---|---|---|---|---|---|---|---|---|---|---|---|---|---|
| Amica Wronki | | 1–2 | 0–0 | 2–0 | 2–1 | 0–1 | 1–6 | 1–0 | 2–0 | 1–1 | 3–1 | 1–0 | 1–1 | 0–0 | 1–2 | 2–0 | 0–2 | 2–0 |
| GKS Bełchatów | 1–2 | | 2–1 | 3–4 | 0–2 | 2–1 | 0–1 | 3–0 | 1–4 | 2–1 | 1–0 | 4–0 | 0–0 | 1–2 | 2–1 | 0–0 | 1–4 | 1–1 |
| GKS Katowice | 2–1 | 3–1 | | 2–0 | 1–2 | 1–1 | 0–5 | 1–2 | 3–0 | 1–1 | 1–0 | 3–1 | 0–1 | 0–1 | 2–0 | 0–0 | 1–4 | 1–0 |
| Górnik Zabrze | 2–1 | 3–3 | 0–4 | | 2–2 | 2–2 | 3–2 | 3–2 | 2–0 | 1–1 | 1–2 | 0–0 | 0–0 | 3–1 | 3–2 | 2–2 | 1–1 | 1–2 |
| Hutnik Kraków | 0–0 | 0–1 | 0–0 | 0–0 | | 3–0 | 0–3 | 2–1 | 3–1 | 2–0 | 0–0 | 3–1 | 2–0 | 3–0 | 2–0 | 1–2 | 1–4 | 3–2 |
| Lech Poznań | 2–1 | 2–0 | 4–1 | 4–1 | 3–0 | | 1–1 | 0–0 | 0–0 | 1–0 | 1–2 | 2–0 | 1–2 | 2–0 | 0–1 | 0–1 | 1–1 | 0–0 |
| Legia Warsaw | 2–0 | 2–0 | 1–0 | 1–0 | 6–1 | 5–1 | | 2–0 | 4–0 | 5–0 | 4–2 | 3–0 | 2–0 | 5–1 | 3–0 | 3–1 | 1–2 | 1–0 |
| ŁKS Łódź | 0–0 | 1–0 | 1–1 | 1–0 | 0–0 | 1–1 | 2–1 | | 2–3 | 3–1 | 2–1 | 2–0 | 2–0 | 1–1 | 4–0 | 4–0 | 1–1 | 1–1 |
| Olimpia/Lechia Gdańsk | 2–0 | 2–0 | 0–3 (Note: Games Olimpia/Lechia - Lech and Olimpia/Lechia - Katowice didn't take place. The away teams refused to travel to Gdańsk instead of Poznań (officially club's headquarters) for the games. Olimpia/Lechia was then obliged to play in Poznań, which they refused to.) | 1–1 | 1–3 | 0–3 | 1–3 | 4–2 | | 2–0 | 4–1 | 1–0 | 0–0 | 1–1 | 1–2 | 2–1 | 1–7 | 0–0 |
| Pogoń Szczecin | 1–1 | 1–1 | 1–0 | 0–0 | 0–3 | 3–1 | 1–2 | 1–1 | 0–1 | | 2–1 | 3–0 | 3–1 | 2–0 | 1–0 | 2–0 | 0–1 | 1–1 |
| Raków Częstochowa | 0–1 | 1–0 | 3–0 | 2–2 | 1–0 | 0–0 | 0–1 | 1–3 | 4–0 | 2–1 | | 1–1 | 1–1 | 2–0 | 1–0 | 0–0 | 0–1 | 1–0 |
| Siarka Tarnobrzeg | 2–3 | 1–2 | 0–0 | 0–2 | 0–2 | 1–0 | 2–7 | 1–1 | 3–3 | 0–1 | 0–1 | | 0–4 | 2–0 | 0–1 | 0–0 | 1–3 | 2–3 |
| Sokół Pniewy/Tychy | 0–0 | 2–0 | 0–0 | 1–2 | 4–3 | 3–2 | 1–3 | 0–2 | 1–0 | 0–0 | 0–1 | 4–1 | | 2–1 | 3–1 | 1–1 | 0–1 | 2–0 |
| Stal Mielec | 0–2 | 3–4 | 0–1 | 0–1 | 1–2 | 3–2 | 0–5 | 0–1 | 2–1 | 3–1 | 0–0 | 0–2 | 2–0 | | 1–0 | 1–3 | 1–2 | 1–2 |
| Stomil Olsztyn | 2–0 | 2–0 | 1–1 | 0–0 | 2–1 | 0–0 | 1–1 | 1–0 | 0–2 | 0–1 | 1–0 | 2–0 | 2–1 | 1–4 | | 3–2 | 0–1 | 1–0 |
| Śląsk Wrocław | 2–2 | 1–1 | 2–2 | 2–1 | 2–0 | 0–1 | 0–0 | 3–0 | 1–1 | 1–0 | 0–0 | 3–0 | 1–1 | 4–1 | 1–1 | | 1–2 | 1–1 |
| Widzew Łódź | 2–0 | 5–0 | 1–0 | 4–1 | 2–0 | 3–3 | 1–1 | 3–1 | 1–0 | 3–0 | 4–1 | 2–1 | 5–0 | 4–1 | 2–2 | 4–0 | | 1–0 |
| Zagłębie Lubin | 0–1 | 0–1 | 1–0 | 2–1 | 1–1 | 2–2 | 0–3 | 1–0 | 3–0 | 0–2 | 1–0 | 3–2 | 0–0 | 5–1 | 0–0 | 2–1 | 0–0 | |

Source: 90minut.pl (in Polish)
Legend: Blue = home team win; Yellow = draw; Red = away team win.

== Top goalscorers ==
| Rank | Player | Club | Goals |
|---|---|---|---|
| 1 | (Poland) Marek Koniarek | Widzew Łódź | 29 |
| 2 | (Poland) Jerzy Podbrożny | Legia Warsaw | 19 |
| 3 | (Poland) Tomasz Wieszczycki | Legia Warsaw | 18 |
| 4 | (Poland) Robert Dymkowski | Pogoń Szczecin | 17 |
| 5 | (Poland) Piotr Prabucki | Lech Poznań | 14 |
| 6 | (Poland) Bogusław Cygan | Stal Mielec | 13 |
| 6 | (Poland) Cezary Kucharski | Legia Warsaw | 13 |
| 8 | (Poland) Ryszard Czerwiec | Widzew Łódź | 12 |
| 9 | (Poland) Krzysztof Bukalski | Hutnik Kraków | 11 |
| 9 | (Poland) Marcin Mięciel | ŁKS Łódź / Legia Warsaw | 11 |
| 9 | (Poland) Leszek Pisz | Legia Warsaw | 11 |
| 9 | (Poland) Marek Saganowski | ŁKS Łódź | 11 |

== Attendances ==
| No. | Club | Average |
|---|---|---|
| 1 | Stomil Olsztyn | 9,824 |
| 2 | Śląsk Wrocław | 6,382 |
| 3 | Olimpia Poznań | 6,059 |
| 4 | Raków Częstochowa | 6,000 |
| 5 | Widzew Łódź | 5,930 |
| 6 | Legia Warszawa | 5,347 |
| 7 | Pogoń Szczecin | 4,989 |
| 8 | Bełchatów | 4,482 |
| 9 | ŁKS | 4,020 |
| 10 | Sokól Pniewy | 3,971 |
| 11 | Górnik Zabrze | 3,083 |
| 12 | Amica Wronki | 2,882 |
| 13 | Katowice | 2,494 |
| 14 | Hutnik Kraków | 2,371 |
| 15 | Lech Poznań | 2,359 |
| 16 | Zagłębie Lubin | 2,282 |
| 17 | Stal Mielec | 2,254 |
| 18 | Siarka Tarnobrzeg | 2,018 |
