= 1996–97 Ekstraklasa =

70th season of top-tier football league in Poland

Liga
- Season: 1996–97
- Champions: Widzew Łódź (4th title)
- Relegated: GKS Bełchatów; Hutnik Kraków; Śląsk Wrocław; Sokół Tychy
- Matches: 295
- Goals: 764 (2.59 per match)
- Top goalscorer: Mirosław Trzeciak (18 goals)
- Average attendance: 3,818 ▼10.5%

Statistics of Ekstraklasa for the 1996–97 season.

== Overview ==
18 teams and played in the league and the title was won by Widzew Łódź.

== League table ==
Pos	Team	Pld	W	D	L	GF	GA	GD	Pts	Qualification or relegation
1	Widzew Łódź (C)	34	25	6	3	74	21	+53	81	Qualification to Champions League first qualifying round
2	Legia Warsaw	34	24	5	5	66	27	+39	77	Qualification to Cup Winners' Cup qualifying round
3	Odra Wodzisław	34	16	7	11	51	44	+7	55	Qualification to UEFA Cup first qualifying round and Intertoto Cup group stage
4	GKS Katowice	34	14	11	9	47	40	+7	53	
5	Amica Wronki	34	14	10	10	41	40	+1	52	
6	ŁKS Łódź	34	13	10	11	55	45	+10	49	
7	Zagłębie Lubin	34	13	10	11	44	38	+6	49	
8	Polonia Warsaw	34	13	9	12	40	44	−4	48	Qualification to Intertoto Cup group stage
9	Stomil Olsztyn	34	12	8	14	45	46	−1	44	
10	Raków Częstochowa	34	11	11	12	35	39	−4	44	
11	Lech Poznań	34	11	11	12	40	40	0	44	
12	Wisła Kraków	34	11	9	14	33	42	−9	42	
13	Górnik Zabrze	34	11	8	15	40	45	−5	41	
14	Ruch Chorzów	34	9	13	12	41	41	0	40	
15	GKS Bełchatów (R)	34	11	7	16	36	43	−7	40	Relegated to II liga
16	Hutnik Kraków (R)	34	8	11	15	34	46	−12	35	Relegated to II liga
17	Śląsk Wrocław (R)	34	6	6	22	24	56	−32	24	Relegated to II liga
18	Sokół Tychy (R)	34	5	6	23	18	67	−49	21	Relegated to II liga

Source: 90minut.pl (in Polish)
(C) Champions; (R) Relegated

== Results ==
Home \ Away	AMC	BEŁ	KAT	GÓR	HUT	LPO	LEG	ŁKS	ODR	PWA	RAK	RUC	TYC	STO	ŚLĄ	WID	WIS	ZLU
Amica Wronki		1–0	2–0	3–0	3–0	1–0	2–1	2–2	0–0	0–1	1–0	1–0	0–0	1–1	1–0	1–2	1–1	3–2
GKS Bełchatów	3–1		1–1	0–1	2–2	1–1	0–1	0–0	2–0	0–2	1–1	0–2	1–3	1–0	3–2	2–0	1–2	1–0
GKS Katowice	4–1	0–1		1–0	1–0	0–1	1–3	1–0	4–1	1–0	2–1	1–0	3–0 (Note: Sokół Tychy withdrew during the season (after 26 matches).)	2–1	1–1	3–4	2–0	0–2
Górnik Zabrze	1–1	2–1	3–1		2–0	0–2	2–3	1–4	2–1	0–1	0–1	1–0	6–0	3–1	2–0	0–1	3–1	2–2
Hutnik Kraków	0–0	1–1	2–3	2–0		1–1	2–1	2–0	1–2	0–1	3–1	3–5	0–0	1–0	1–0	0–0	2–0	0–0
Lech Poznań	1–1	1–1	0–0	1–0	2–1		0–2	4–1	3–1	2–2	1–1	2–0	1–0	0–1	3–1	1–2	1–0	1–2
Legia Warsaw	2–0	3–2	2–1	2–0	2–0	1–1		3–0	5–1	3–0	2–1	3–1	3–0	2–1	1–0	2–3	2–1	2–1
ŁKS Łódź	1–2	2–0	1–1	4–1	1–1	2–1	2–1		1–2	4–2	1–1	0–0	1–0	4–2	5–2	1–1	5–0	2–1
Odra Wodzisław	3–0	4–1	0–0	1–0	3–2	1–2	0–3	0–0		3–1	0–0	2–1	5–1	3–1	3–1	1–1	1–0	2–1
Polonia Warsaw	1–1	0–1	1–1	1–1	5–1	2–1	1–1	1–1	0–2		3–1	1–0	1–0	1–1	4–0	0–3	1–0	1–1
Raków Częstochowa	0–1	1–2	1–1	0–0	1–0	2–0	1–1	2–1	0–0	2–0		1–0	1–1	1–4	3–0 (Note: Śląsk Wrocław withdrew during the season (after 31 matches).)	0–4	1–1	1–0
Ruch Chorzów	2–2	2–0	1–1	1–2	2–2	0–0	1–1	2–1	3–2	2–0	2–0		3–0	1–1	1–1	1–2	1–1	1–0
Sokół Tychy	0–3	0–3	0–0	2–2	0–2	5–3	0–1	0–3	0–3 (Note: The match between Sokół and Odra didn't take place. Sokół due to a strike fielded only 5 players.)	1–2	0–3	2–1		2–1	1–0	0–3	0–1	0–0
Stomil Olsztyn	1–3	1–2	1–1	1–1	2–1	3–0	0–0	1–1	3–1	4–1	0–1	2–2	1–0		2–0	1–0	1–0	3–0
Śląsk Wrocław	2–0	1–0	0–2	1–1	0–0	1–0	0–3	3–0	3–1	0–2	0–0	1–1	3–0	0–1		0–2	1–3	0–3
Widzew Łódź	4–0	1–0	4–0	3–0	2–0	2–2	1–0	0–1	2–1	4–0	5–1	3–0	2–0	4–0	4–0		1–0	0–0
Wisła Kraków	2–1	1–0	1–3	1–0	0–0	1–1	1–3	3–2	0–0	0–0	0–3	1–1	2–0	5–2	1–0	1–2		2–0
Zagłębie Lubin	3–1	3–2	4–4	1–1	3–1	1–0	0–1	2–1	0–1	2–1	2–1	1–1	3–0	1–0	1–0	2–2	0–0	

Source: 90minut.pl (in Polish)
Legend: Blue = home team win; Yellow = draw; Red = away team win.

== Top goalscorers ==
Rank	Player	Club	Goals
1	(Poland) Mirosław Trzeciak	ŁKS Łódź	18
2	(Poland) Jacek Dembiński	Widzew Łódź	17
2	(Poland) Cezary Kucharski	Legia Warsaw	17
4	(Poland) Sławomir Wojciechowski	GKS Katowice	15
5	(Poland) Mariusz Śrutwa	Ruch Chorzów	14
6	(Poland) Sławomir Majak	Widzew Łódź	12
6	(Poland) Piotr Reiss	Lech Poznań	12
8	(Poland) Marcin Kuźba	Górnik Zabrze	11
8	(Poland) Bogdan Prusek	Sokół Tychy / Amica Wronki	11
8	(Poland) Sławomir Suchomski	GKS Bełchatów	11
8	(Poland) Krzysztof Zagórski	Odra Wodzisław	11
12	(Poland) Waldemar Adamczyk	Hutnik Kraków	10

== Attendances ==
Club	Average
Stomil Olsztyn	6,500
Widzew Łódź	6,030
Odra Wodzisław Śląski	5,599
Legia Warszawa	5,094
Raków Częstochowa	4,469
Ruch Chorzów	4,330
Wisła Kraków	4,294
GKS Bełchatów	4,171
Śląsk Wrocław	3,819
Górnik Zabrze	3,627
GKS Katowice	3,175
ŁKS	2,992
Sokół Pniewy	2,646
Polonia Warszawa	2,588
Amica Wronki	2,565
Zagłębie Lubin	2,531
Lech Poznań	2,476
Hutnik Kraków	1,541
