= 2000–01 FC Dinamo București season =

FC Dinamo București
2000–01 season
- Head coach: Cornel Dinu
- Divizia A: 2nd
- Romanian Cup: Winners
- UEFA Champions League: Second qualifying round
- Top goalscorer: Marius Niculae (20 goals)

The 2000–01 season was FC Dinamo București's 52nd season in Divizia A. Dinamo finished 2nd in the league and he won the Romanian Cup. In the UEFA Champions League, they played in second qualifying round.

Cătălin Hîldan died on 5 October 2000, while playing in a friendly match between Dinamo and Șantierul Naval Oltenița, having a stroke in the 74th minute of the game and fell to the ground. Before his death he was nicknamed "The only captain" by Dinamo's fans, a nickname that became more popular after his death and his number, 11, was retired by Dinamo in his honor. The north stand of the Dinamo Stadium is named "Peluza Cătălin Hîldan" (Cătălin Hîldan Stand), in his honor, also the Stadionul Cătălin Hîldan from his native Brănești is named after him.

== Players ==
=== Squad information ===
Squad at end of season

Note: Flags indicate national team as defined under FIFA eligibility rules; some limited exceptions apply. Players may hold more than one non-FIFA nationality.

No.	Pos.	Nation	Player
1	GK	ROU	Ștefan Preda
2	DF	ROU	Tinel Petre
3	DF	ROU	Iosif Tâlvan
4	DF	ROU	Valentin Năstase
5	DF	ROU	Daniel Florea
6	DF	ROU	Gheorghe Mihali
7	DF	ROU	Mugur Bolohan
8	MF	ROU	Florentin Petre
9	FW	ROU	Adrian Mihalcea
10	FW	ROU	Marius Niculae
11	MF	ROU	Cătălin Hîldan
12	GK	ROU	Florin Tene
14	MF	ROU	Florin Cernat
15	MF	ROU	Ianis Zicu

No.	Pos.	Nation	Player
16	DF	ROU	Bogdan Onuț
17	MF	ROU	Giani Kiriţă
18	MF	ROU	Vlad Munteanu
19	FW	ROU	Claudiu Drăgan
20	MF	ROU	Dănuț Lupu
21	DF	ROU	Sorin Iodi
22	FW	ROU	Bogdan Mara
23	GK	ROU	Florin Prunea
24	MF	ROU	Ionuț Lupescu
25	MF	ROU	Iulian Tameș
26	MF	ROU	Ionuț Badea
29	MF	ROU	Alin Ilin
—	DF	ROU	Bogdan Hriscu
—	MF	ROU	Iulian Arhire

== League table ==
Pos	Team	Pld	W	D	L	GF	GA	GD	Pts	Qualification or relegation
1	Steaua București (C)	30	17	9	4	56	32	+24	60	Qualification to Champions League second qualifying round
2	Dinamo București	30	15	6	9	56	44	+12	51	Qualification to UEFA Cup qualifying round
3	Brașov	30	15	5	10	33	25	+8	50	Qualification to UEFA Cup qualifying round
4	Rapid București	30	13	10	7	38	25	+13	49	Qualification to UEFA Cup qualifying round
5	Argeș Pitești	30	12	10	8	42	42	0	46	
6	Gloria Bistrița	30	13	4	13	44	42	+2	43 (Note: GLO 3-0 PRO; PRO 0-3 GLO)	Qualification to Intertoto Cup first round
7	Național București	30	13	4	13	40	40	0	43	
8	Universitatea Craiova	30	11	8	11	34	38	−4	41	Qualification to Intertoto Cup first round
9	Petrolul Ploiești	30	12	4	14	34	36	−2	40 (Note: AST 0-0 PET; PET 3-1 AST)	
10	Astra Ploiești	30	11	7	12	41	36	+5	40	
11	Ceahlăul Piatra Neamț	30	9	11	10	36	41	−5	38 (Note: OTE 1-1 CEA; CEA 0-0 OTE)	
12	Oțelul Galați	30	10	8	12	33	39	−6	38	
13	Foresta Fălticeni (R)	30	8	12	10	39	43	−4	36	Qualification to relegation play-offs
14	Bacău	30	9	7	14	38	45	−7	34 (Note: BAC 3-0 ROC; ROC 2-0 BAC)	Qualification to relegation play-offs
15	Rocar București (R)	30	10	4	16	41	56	−15	34	Relegation to Divizia B
16	Gaz Metan Mediaș (R)	30	3	9	18	21	42	−21	18	Relegation to Divizia B

Source: LT (in Romanian)
Rules for classification: 1) points; 2) head-to-head points; 3) head-to-head goal difference; 4) head-to-head goals scored; 5) goal difference; 6) number of goals scored.
(C) Champions; (R) Relegated

== Results ==
Dinamo's score comes first

=== Legend ===
Win	Draw	Loss

=== Cupa României ===
Round	Date	Opponent	Venue	Result	Goalscorers
R of 32	6 September 2000	Extensiv Craiova	A	3–0	
R of 16	8 November 2000	FCU Craiova	H	3–2	
QF	30 November 2000	Rapid București	H	2–1	
SF - 1st leg	4 April 2001	Sportul Studențesc București	A	2–2	
SF - 2nd leg	2 May 2001	Sportul Studențesc București	H	3–1	

== Final ==
16 June 2001
21:30 EEST

Dinamo București	4–2	Rocar București
Mihalcea 6', 72'; Niculae 55', 68' (pen.)	Report	Ursu 9'; Nicolae 30'

Stadionul Naţional
Attendance: 26,000
Referee: Urs Meier (Switzerland)

Cupa României 2000–01 winners
Dinamo București
9th title

=== UEFA Champions League ===
26 July 2000
20:00 (CET)

Dinamo București (Romania)	3–4	(Poland) Polonia Warsaw
Lupu 7'; Mihalcea 45'; Niculae 63'	Report	Wieszczycki 23', 58'; Olisadebe 35'; Gołaszewski 88'

Stadionul Național, Bucharest
Attendance: 18,500
Referee: José Victor Esquinas Torres (Spain)
2 August 2000
20:00 (CET)

Polonia Warsaw (Poland)	3–1	(Romania) Dinamo București
Olisadebe 59', 61'; Gołaszewski 65'	Report	Tameș 43'

Stadion Wisły, Płock
Attendance: 3,560
Referee: Jorge Monteiro Coroado (Portugal)

Polonia Warsaw won 7–4 on aggregate.
