= Theo Bos (footballer) =

Dutch footballer and coach

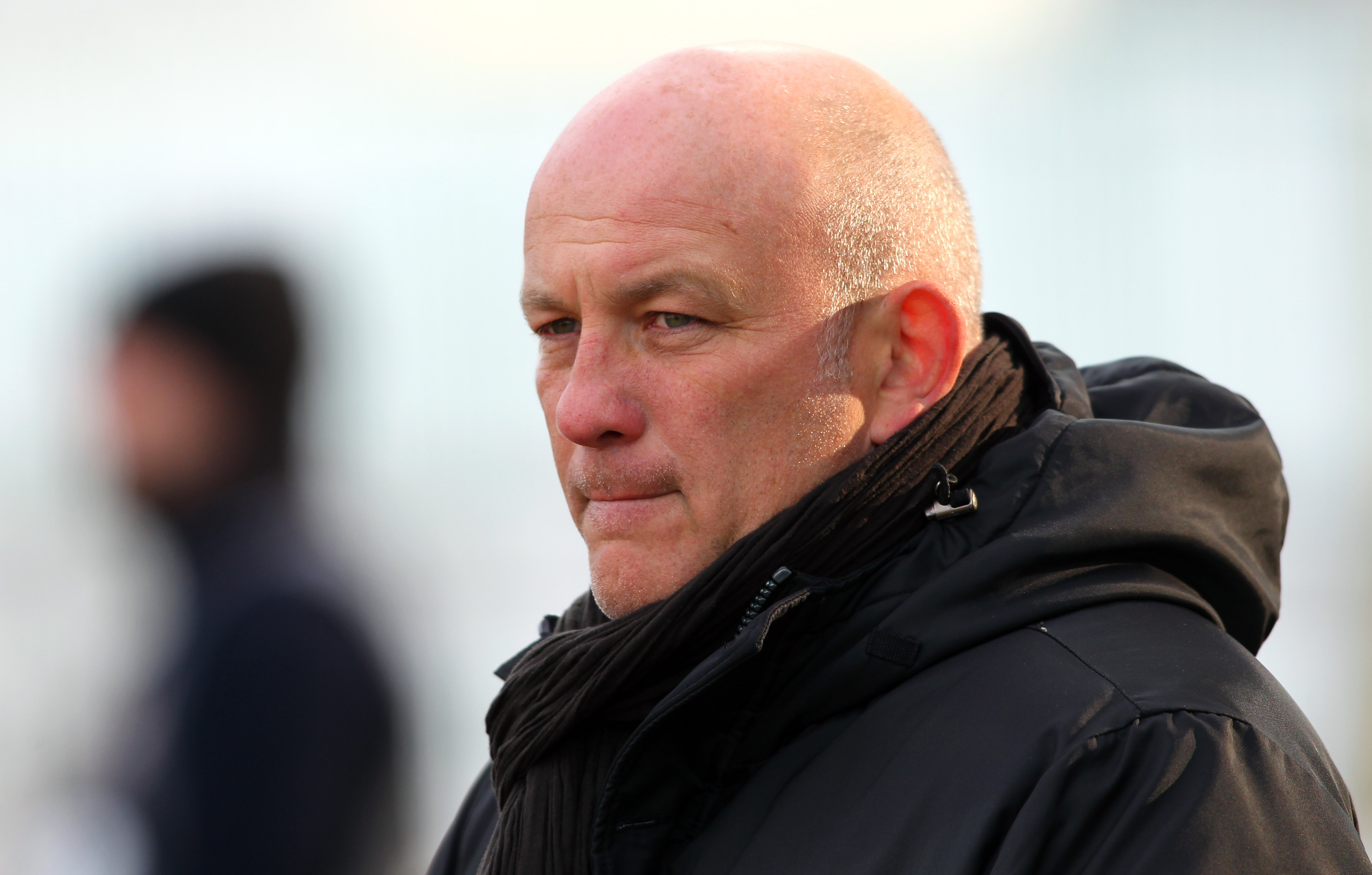
- Bos in 2011

Personal information
- Date of birth: 5 October 1965
- Place of birth: Nijmegen, Netherlands
- Date of death: 28 February 2013 (aged 47)
- Place of death: Elst, Netherlands
- Position: Defender

Youth career
- Sempre Avanti
- 1979–1983: Vitesse

Senior career*
Years	Team	Apps	(Gls)
1983–1998	Vitesse	429	(1)

Managerial career
- 2005–2009: Den Bosch
- 2009–2010: Vitesse
- 2011: Polonia Warszawa
- 2011–2012: Dordrecht
- * Club domestic league appearances and goals

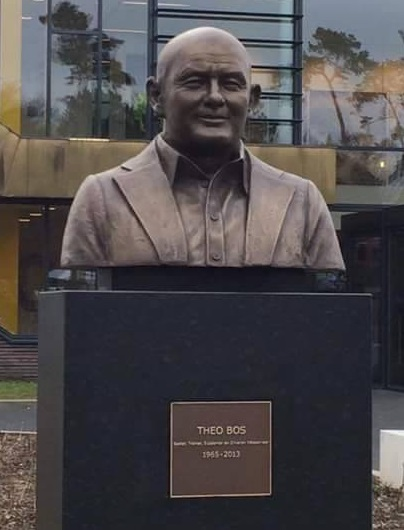
Mister Vitesse Theo Bos

Theo Bos (5 October 1965 – 28 February 2013) was a Dutch football player and coach. He played for Vitesse Arnhem from 1983 to 1998. During his career at Vitesse, he amassed a total of 429 matches, a record for the club.

== Playing career ==
Bos was born in 1965 in Nijmegen and growed up in Arnhem. Bos began his career at amateur club Sv Sempre Avanti and played from 1979 to 1983 in the academy of Vitesse. After breaking through in several youth teams Bos made his professional debut on 13 August 1983 in the first team against FC Wageningen, which Vitesse won 3–0.

In the 1988–89 season Bos won the Eerste Divisie title. The following season saw further progress; a fourth-place finish in 1989–90 saw Vitesse qualify for the UEFA Cup for the first time in its history. The club also reached the final of the domestic cup. He scored his first goal for Vitesse on 11 February 1990 during the 2–1 victory against FC Den Bosch.

Bos spent his entire career for Vitesse, making a total of 429 appearances in 14 seasons with his club. He is therefore considered to be Mister Vitesse.

== Coaching career ==
Theo Bos served as manager of FC Den Bosch from 2005 to 2009. Later in 2009, it was confirmed he would make a comeback at Vitesse, this time as a head coach. He was removed from his managerial duties in October 2010 by new club owner, Georgian businessman Merab Jordania.

In January 2011, Bos was hired by Polish club Polonia Warsaw's boss Józef Wojciechowski as a first-team manager. He was sacked in March 2011, after a 1–0 loss against Zaglebie Lubin.

He served as head coach of Dutch Eerste Divisie club FC Dordrecht in the 2011–12 season, replacing Henny Lee who opted to leave the club in order to join FC Utrecht in the Eredivisie league. In January 2012 he was forced to take indefinite leave of absence after he was diagnosed with pancreatic cancer; his place as head coach was temporarily taken by assistant Virgil Breetveld on an interim basis. After the end of the season it seemed like Bos would return to being in charge of the team; however, on 14 July 2012, it was announced that he had been forced to take indefinite sick leave due to his health conditions.

== Death ==
Bos died on 28 February 2013 of pancreatic cancer, aged 47 in Elst. Following his death, a special remembrance to honour Theo Bos took place at Gelredome with around 7,000 Vitesse supporters. Bos was survived by his wife Marieke and their daughter as well as two children from a previous marriage. Vitesse retired his shirt number 4 from use in his honour.

== See also ==
- List of one-club men
