= Dźwigała =

Dźwigała is a Polish surname. Notable people with the surname include:

- Adam Dźwigała (born 1995), Polish footballer
- Dariusz Dźwigała (born 1969), Polish footballer
