= Daniel Gołębiewski =

Polish footballer (born 1987)

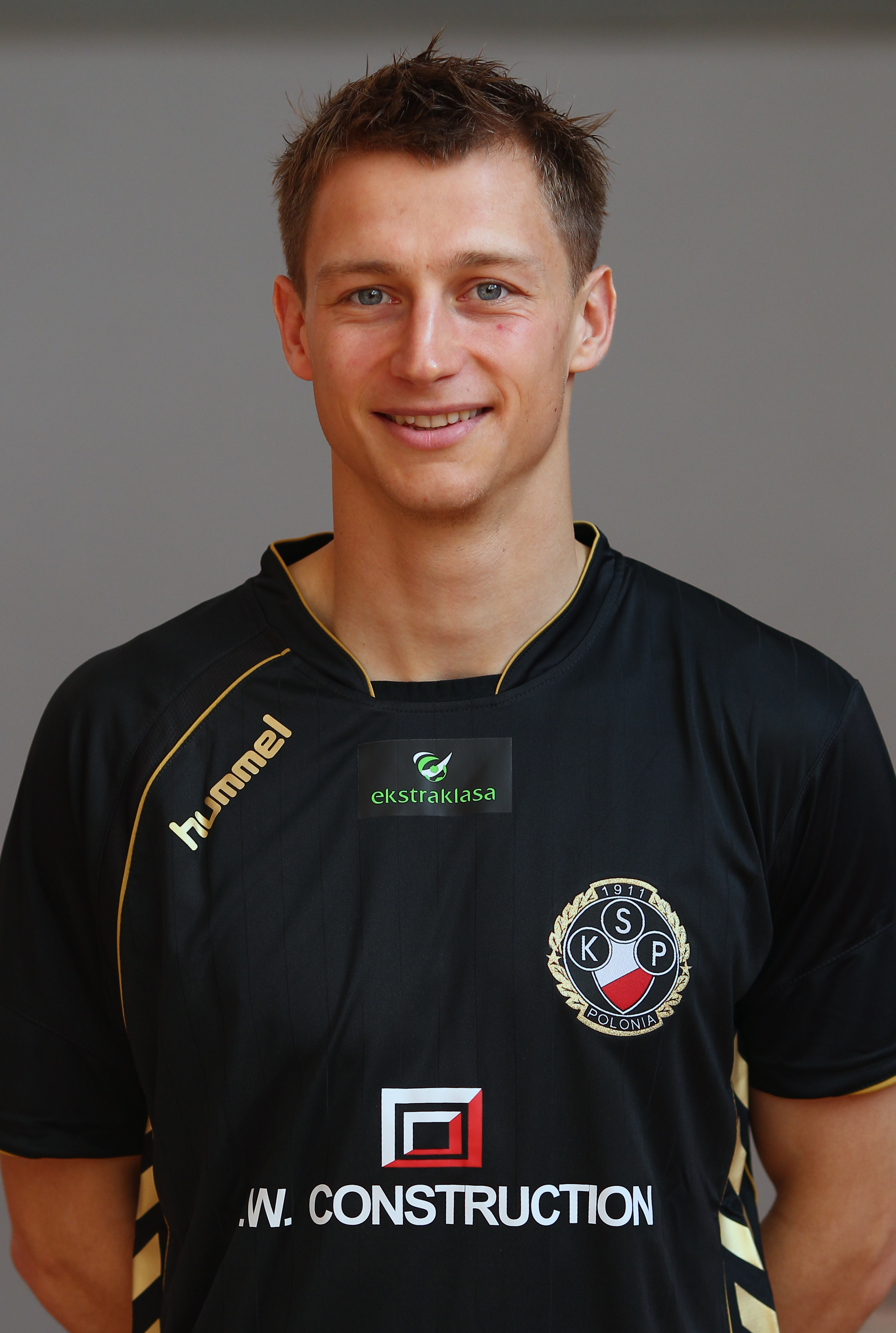
- Gołębiewski with Polonia Warsaw in 2011

Personal information
- Date of birth: 15 July 1987 (age 39)
- Place of birth: Wyszków, Poland
- Height: 1.86 m (6 ft 1 in)
- Position: Striker

Team information
- Current team: Polonia Warsaw & Poland U19 (fitness coach)

Youth career
- MOSiR Wyszków
- 2004–2006: Polonia Warsaw

Senior career*
Years	Team	Apps	(Gls)
2006–2007	Polonia Warsaw II		
2007–2013	Polonia Warsaw	94	(18)
2008	→ ŁKS Łomża (loan)	12	(2)
2011	→ Górnik Zabrze (loan)	9	(2)
2012	→ Korona Kielce (loan)	12	(1)
2013–2015	Korona Kielce	26	(1)
2014	→ Bytovia Bytów (loan)	10	(0)
2015–2016	Dolcan Ząbki	23	(8)
2016–2017	Pogoń Siedlce	31	(4)
2017	Polonia Warsaw	12	(3)
2017–2018	Widzew Łódź	10	(2)
2018	Kotwica Kołobrzeg	2	(0)
2018	Legionovia Legionowo	11	(1)
2019	Żbik Nasielsk	20	(10)
- * Club domestic league appearances and goals

Daniel Gołębiewski (born 15 July 1987) is a Polish former professional footballer. Nominally a centre-forward, he also played as a left midfielder and left-back. He is currently the fitness coach for his former club Polonia Warsaw and the Poland U19 national team.

== Club career ==
In June 2011, he was loaned to Górnik Zabrze on a one-year deal.

In 2019, Gołębiewski joined Żbik Nasielsk.
