= Igor Gołaszewski =

Polish footballer

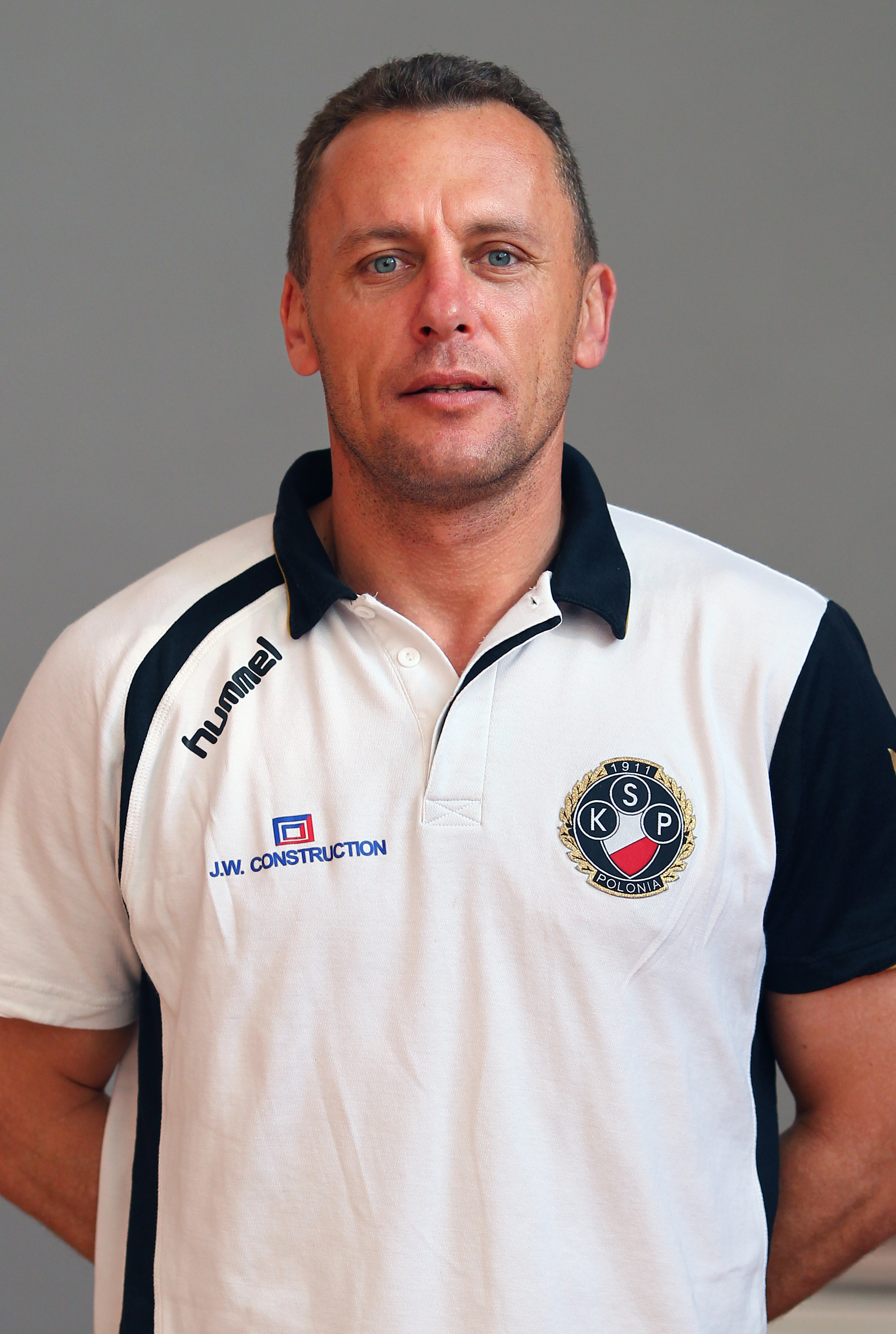
- Portrait of Igor Gołaszewski in 2011

Personal information
- Date of birth: 2 March 1968 (age 58)
- Place of birth: Płońsk, Poland
- Height: 1.80 m (5 ft 11 in)
- Position: Midfielder

Senior career*
Years	Team	Apps	(Gls)
1988–1992	Tęcza 34 Płońsk		
1992–1995	KS Piaseczno		
1995–1997	Polonia Warsaw		
1997	Śląsk Wrocław	10	(1)
1997–2006	Polonia Warsaw	209	(34)
2006–2007	Start Otwock		
2007	Tęcza 34 Płońsk		
2008–2012	Mewa Krubin		
2012–2013	Polonia Warsaw		

Managerial career
- 2006–2007: Start Otwock II
- 2008: Polonia Warsaw II
- 2014: Świt Nowy Dwór Mazowiecki
- 2015–2017: Polonia Warsaw
- 2017–2019: MKS Piaseczno
- * Club domestic league appearances and goals

Igor Gołaszewski (born 2 March 1968) is a Polish football manager and former player.

== Honours ==
Polonia Warsaw

- Ekstraklasa: 1999–2000
- Polish Cup: 2000–01
- Polish League Cup: 1999–2000
- Polish Super Cup: 2000

Individual

- Polish League Cup top scorer: 1999–2000
