= Dariusz Dźwigała =

Polish footballer (born 1969)

Personal information
- Full name: Dariusz Bogusław Dźwigała
- Date of birth: 22 March 1969 (age 57)
- Place of birth: Warsaw, Poland
- Height: 1.78 m (5 ft 10 in)
- Position: Midfielder

Youth career
- Drukarz Warsaw
- Polonia Warsaw

Senior career*
| Years | Team | Apps | (Gls) |
| 1989–1990 | Gwardia Warsaw | | |
| 1990–1991 | Ursus Warsaw | | |
| 1991–1995 | Polonia Warsaw | | |
| 1996 | Hapoel Kfar Saba | 7 | (0) |
| 1996 | Hetman Zamość | | |
| 1997–1999 | Górnik Zabrze | 72 | (6) |
| 1999 | → GKS Katowice (loan) | 9 | (0) |
| 2000–2001 | Pogoń Szczecin | 43 | (9) |
| 2001 | Diyarbakırspor | 7 | (0) |
| 2002 | Pogoń Szczecin | 18 | (4) |
| 2003–2006 | Polonia Warsaw | 85 | (10) |
| 2006–2008 | Start Otwock | | |
| 2009 | KS Wesoła | | |
| 2010 | Start Otwock II | | |
| 2011 | Radomiak Radom | | |
| 2013–2014 | Victoria Sulejówek | | |
| 2014 | NL6 Gdynia | | |
| 2014–2015 | KS Teresin | | |

Managerial career
- 2007–2011: Start Otwock (player-manager)
- 2011–2012: Radomiak Radom
- 2014: Victoria Sulejówek (player-manager)
- 2014: Arka Gdynia
- 2014: Polonia Warsaw
- 2015–2016: Dolcan Ząbki
- 2016: Podbeskidzie Bielsko-Biała
- 2017–2018: Poland U19
- 2017–2018: Poland U18
- 2018: Wisła Płock
- * Club domestic league appearances and goals

Dariusz Bogusław Dźwigała (born 22 March 1969) is a Polish professional football manager and former player. His son Adam Dźwigała is also a professional footballer who plays for FC St. Pauli.

Having started his career at Drukarz Warsaw, he played for several other teams including Polonia Warsaw and Gwardia Warsaw. He moved to Turkey in 2001 where he played for Diyarbakırspor, before returning to Poland the following year.

With Górnik Zabrze, Dźwigała captained a club team into the UEFA Cup.

He worked as a coach with Wisła Płock in the Ekstraklasa.

== Honours ==
=== Player-manager ===
Start Otwock

- IV liga Masovia: 2007–08
