= Mieczysław Broniszewski =

Polish football manager

Personal information
- Date of birth: 30 December 1948 (age 77)
- Place of birth: Karczew, Poland

Senior career*
Years	Team	Apps	(Gls)
- Mazur Karczew
- Wisła Płock

Managerial career
- 1971–1977: Mazur Karczew
- 1981–1988: Poland U18
- 1981–1988: Poland U20
- 1988: Stilon Gorzów Wielkopolski
- 1990: Stilon Gorzów Wielkopolski
- 1991–1992: Stilon Gorzów Wielkopolski
- 1993: Motor Lublin
- 1993–1995: Poland (assistant)
- 1994–1995: Poland U21
- 1996: Wisła Kraków (assistant)
- 1996–1997: Polonia Warsaw
- 1997–1998: Stomil Olsztyn
- 1999: Amica Wronki
- 1999: Stomil Olsztyn
- 2000: Górnik Zabrze
- 2002–2003: Wisła Płock
- 2004: Polonia Warsaw
- 2004–2005: GKS Katowice
- 2005: Radomiak Radom
- 2008–2009: Stilon Gorzów Wielkopolski
- 2011: Wisła Płock
Medal record
Men's football
Representing Poland (as manager)
FIFA World Youth Championship
Third place	1983 Mexico
UEFA European Under-18 Championship
Third place	1984 Soviet Union
- * Club domestic league appearances and goals

Mieczysław Broniszewski (born 30 December 1948) is a Polish former professional football manager and player. His son Marcin is also a football manager.

== Honours ==
Poland U20

- FIFA World Youth Championship third place: 1983

Poland U18

- UEFA European Under-18 Championship third place: 1984
