= Grégoire Nitot =

French-Polish entrepreneur

- Born: Grégoire Patrick Clément Nitot; 1976 (age 49–50); Caen, France
- Occupation: Entrepreneur
- Known for: Founder and CEO of Sii Poland; Owner and President of Polonia Warsaw football club

Grégoire Patrick Clément Nitot (born in 1976 in Caen) is a French-Polish entrepreneur and sports executive. He is the founder and CEO of Sii Poland and, since 2020, the owner and president of the Polonia Warsaw football club.

== Life ==
Grégoire Nitot grew up on a boat on the Seine in Paris. At around the age of 18, he decided to pursue a career in business. He completed a master's degree at the Rennes School of Business. In 2000, he came to Poland, where he studied for a year at the Warsaw School of Economics as part of the Erasmus student exchange programme. After completing his studies, he returned to France.

He has lived in Poland since 2006 and received Polish citizenship in 2016.

== Career ==
After working as a Sales Manager in the IT industry in Paris for several years, Nitot moved to Poland in 2006 to establish Sii Poland. With €30,000 in savings, he began looking for an investor. Following negotiations with Sii France, he launched the company with €100,000 in capital, initially operating as a one-person business from an apartment in central Warsaw.

According to financial data for the 2025/26 financial year, Sii Poland generated PLN 2.18 billion in revenue and PLN 252 million in net profit. The company employs more than 7,500 specialists, serves over 200 active clients and operates 14 offices in Poland.

During Nitot's tenure as CEO, Sii Poland expanded its international operations to Ukraine, Sweden, India and Malaysia. The Pune branch in India began operating in 2024, while Sii Malaysia was established in 2026.

In 2018, Nitot became the owner of the Tawerna Kaszubska hotel and restaurant in Brodnica Dolna.

In March 2020, Nitot invested in Polonia Warsaw, helping the football club avoid bankruptcy. The two-time Polish champion returned to the central level of the Polish football league system after a five-year absence. In 2022, Polonia was promoted to the II liga, followed by promotion to the I liga in 2023.

In November 2022, a dispute arose between Sii Poland and employee Krystian Kosowski following his dismissal shortly after he announced the formation of a trade union affiliated with Związkowa Alternatywa. The union alleged that the dismissal was linked to Kosowski's trade union activity, while Sii Poland and its CEO, Grégoire Nitot, maintained that it resulted from conduct considered harmful to the company. In June 2026, the Regional Court in Łódź issued a judgment awarding Kosowski PLN 22,823.28 in compensation for unlawful termination of employment, while declining to order his reinstatement. As a consequence, Sii Poland described the judgment as bringing the dispute to a close.
