= Jacek Kosmalski =

Polish footballer (born 1976)

Personal information
- Date of birth: 4 September 1976 (age 50)
- Place of birth: Białogard, Poland
- Height: 1.79 m (5 ft 10 in)
- Position: Forward

Youth career
- –1993: Głaz Tychowo

Senior career*
Years	Team	Apps	(Gls)
1993–1996	Legia Warsaw II		
1994	→ Granica Chełm (loan)		
1996	→ Kotwica Kołobrzeg (loan)		
1996–1997	Legia Warsaw	2	(0)
1997	→ Dolcan Ząbki (loan)		
1997–1998	Orlęta Łuków		
1998–1999	Chemik Police		
2000–2001	Odra Szczecin	7	(1)
2000–2001	→ Pomerania Police (loan)		
2001–2003	Pogoń Szczecin	34	(4)
2003–2004	ŁKS Łódź	20	(5)
2004–2009	Polonia Warsaw	109	(34)
2010	Zawisza Bydgoszcz	6	(1)
2010–2012	Pogoń Siedlce	53	(31)
2013	Polonia Warsaw		
2013–2014	Mazovia Mińsk Mazowiecki		
2015	Polonia Warsaw		
- * Club domestic league appearances and goals

Jacek Kosmalski (born 4 September 1976) is a Polish former professional footballer who played as a forward. He became top goalscorer of the second tier in the 2006–07 season.

== Honours ==
Pogoń Siedlce

- III liga Łódź–Masovian: 2010–11

Individual

- II liga top scorer: 2006–07
