= Wojciech Szymanek =

Polish footballer and coach

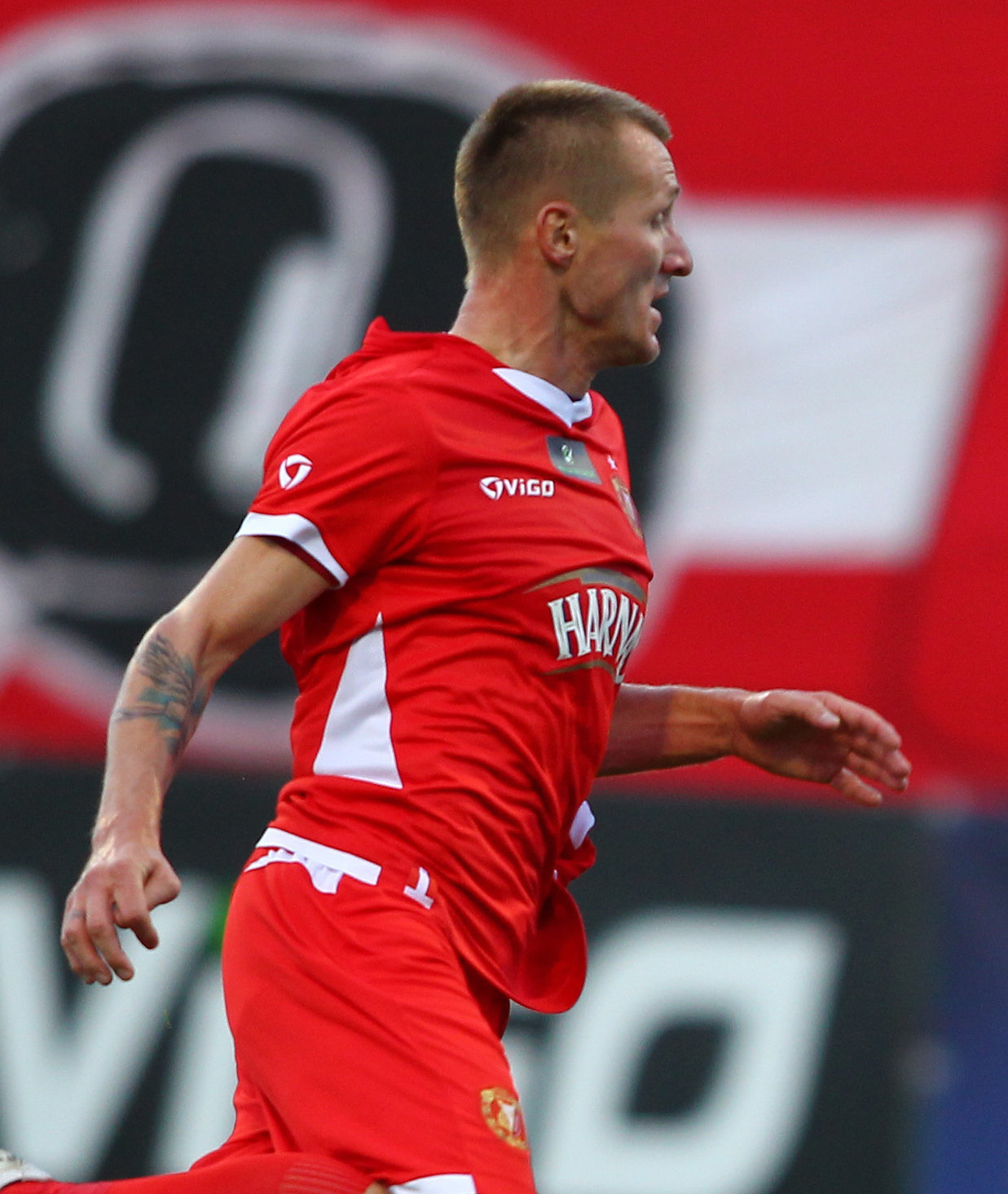
- Szymanek with Widzew Łódź in 2010

Personal information
- Full name: Wojciech Szymanek
- Date of birth: 1 March 1982 (age 44)
- Place of birth: Warsaw, Poland
- Height: 1.85 m (6 ft 1 in)
- Position: Defender

Senior career*
Years	Team	Apps	(Gls)
1999–2000	Polonia Warsaw II		
2000–2006	Polonia Warsaw	74	(3)
2006–2007	Egaleo	36	(0)
2008–2011	Widzew Łódź	62	(1)
2011–2012	Chornomorets Odesa	21	(0)
2012–2013	Polonia Warsaw	8	(0)
2013–2014	Podbeskidzie	3	(0)
2013–2014	Podbeskidzie II	9	(0)
2014–2015	Polonia Warsaw		

Managerial career
- 2017: Polonia Warsaw (caretaker)
- 2020–2021: Polonia Warsaw
- * Club domestic league appearances and goals

Wojciech Szymanek (born 1 March 1982) is a Polish professional football manager and former player, most recently in charge of Polonia Warsaw.

== Career ==
He was released from Widzew Łódź on 22 June 2011.

In July 2011, he signed a one-year contract with Ukrainian Premier League side Chornomorets Odesa.

After a one-year stint with the Ukrainian club, he rejoined his first team Polonia in August 2012.

== Managerial statistics ==
As of match played 19 June 2021

Managerial record by team and tenure
Team	From	To	Record							
Team	From	To	G	W	D	L	GF	GA	GD	Win %
Polonia Warsaw (caretaker)	27 March 2017	30 June 2017	11	3	4	4	16	15	+1	27.27
Polonia Warsaw	14 January 2020	30 June 2021	39	18	9	12	66	45	+21	46.15
Total			50	21	13	16	82	60	+22	42.00

== Honours ==
Widzew Łódź

- I liga: 2008–09, 2009–10
