= Józef Wojciechowski =

Polish developer

Józef Wojciechowski (born 17 January 1947) is a Polish developer, owner of J.W. Construction Holding S.A., and former owner of Polonia Warsaw football club. He was the 31st richest Pole as of 2013, with his wealth estimated at 2 billion zlotys, or about 500 million dollars.
