= Polonia Warsaw =

Polish sports club

Polonia Warszawa
- Full name: Polonia Warszawa S.A.
- Nicknames: Czarne koszule (Blackshirts) – men's team Czarne syrenki (Black Mermaids) – women's team
- Short name: KSP (Klub Sportowy Polonia)
- Founded: 19 November 1911; 114 years ago
- Ground: General Kazimierz Sosnkowski Stadium
- Capacity: 7,150
- Owner: Grégoire Nitot
- Chairman: Grégoire Nitot
- Manager: Piotr Stokowiec
- League: I liga
- 2025–26: I liga, 6th of 18
- Website: kspolonia.pl
Home colours	Away colours

Polonia Warsaw (Polish: Polonia Warszawa, pronounced [pɔˈlɔɲa varˈʂava]), founded on 19 November 1911, is the oldest existing sports club in Warsaw, the capital of Poland, best known for its football and basketball teams. It also has track and field, swimming, chess, mountain biking, and contract bridge sections. Historically it also had sections in ice hockey, fencing, tennis, volleyball, hazena, cycling and boxing.

The football team competes in the I liga, the second level of the Polish football league system.

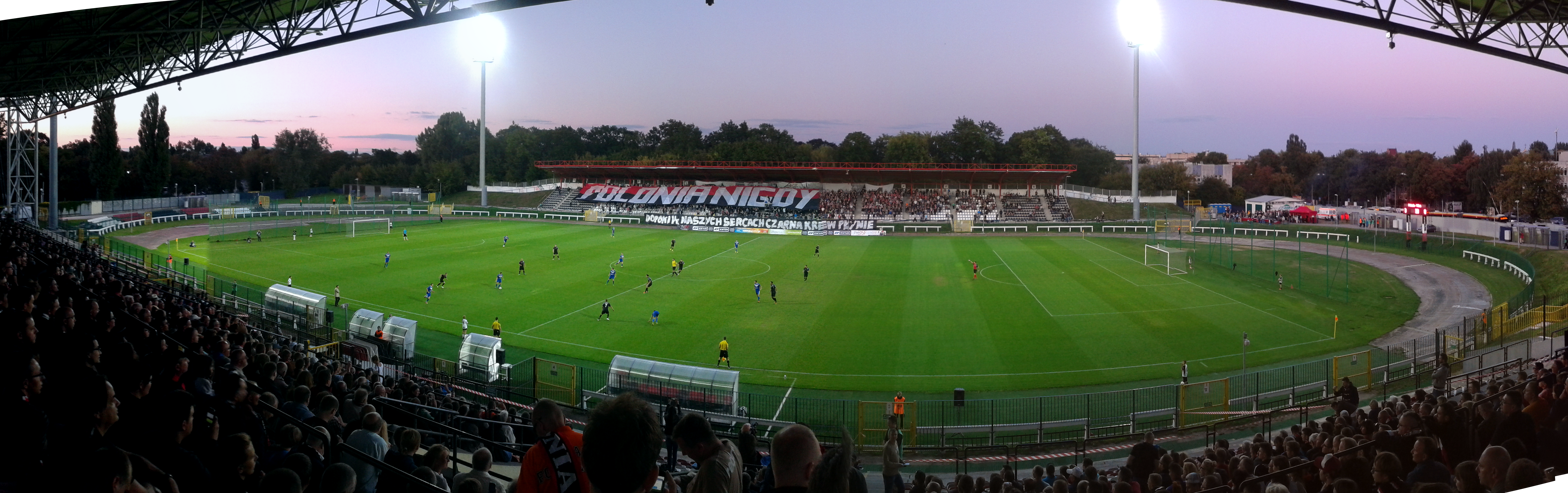
Polonia Warsaw's home ground, the General Kazimierz Sosnkowski Municipal Stadium.

== History ==
=== 20th century ===
==== Beginnings ====
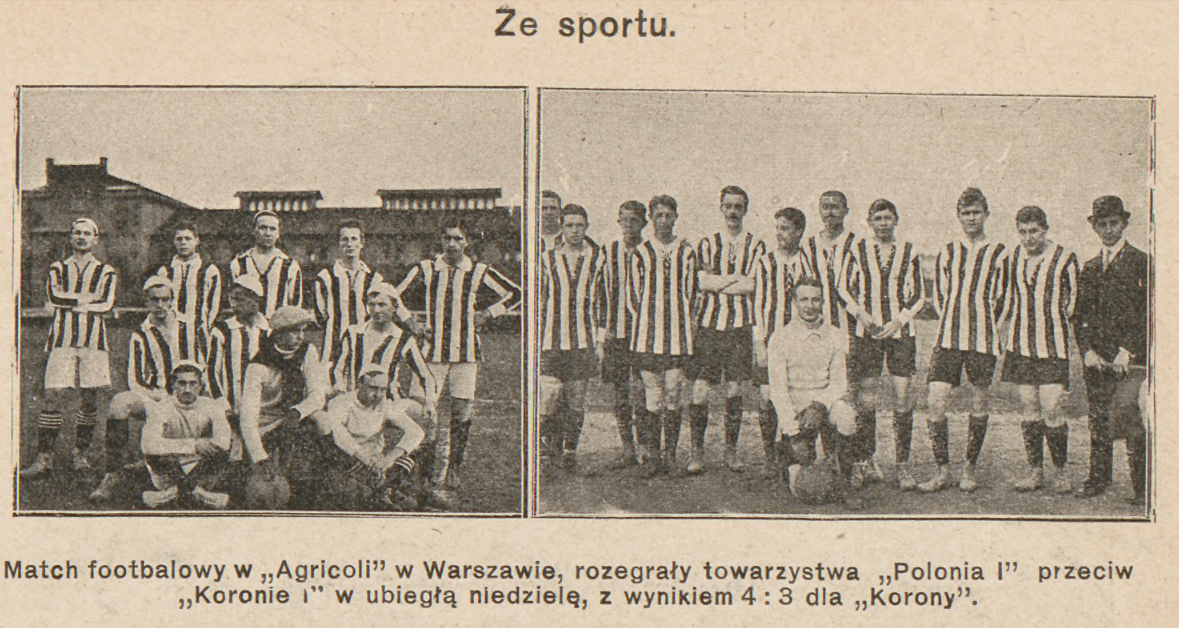
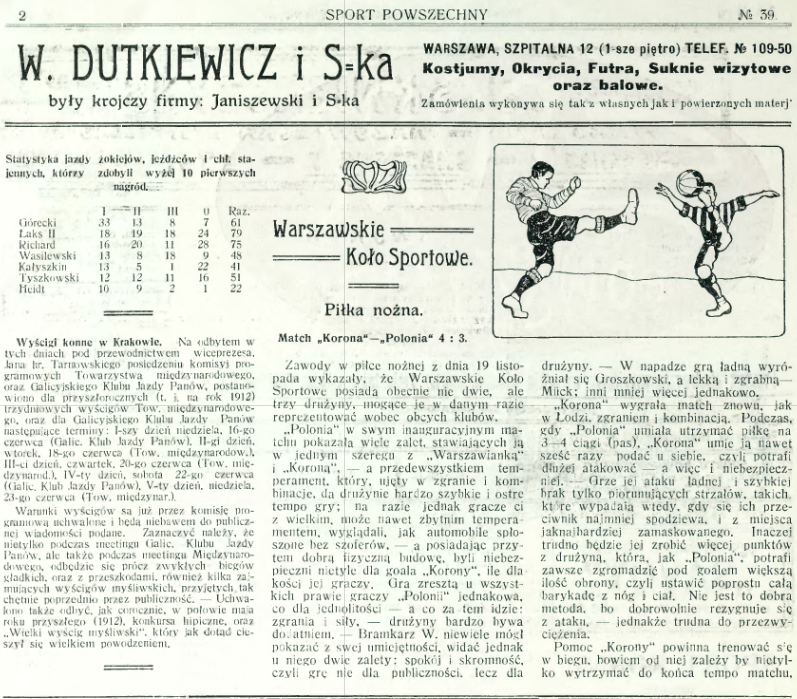
Press notes about the football match between Polonia Warsaw and Korona Warsaw played on 19 November 1911, published in Świat weekly no 47 on 25 November 1911 and Sport Powszechny weekly no 39 on 26 November 1911

Polonia Warsaw was formed in the autumn of 1911 as a union of several gimnazjum school teams (including "Stella" and "Merkury"). Alongside co-founders Wacław Gebethner, Stefan Pronaszko, and Tadeusz Gebethner, Wacław "Denhoff" Czarnocki was the co-founder of the club who also came up with its name. "Polonia" is Latin for "Poland" and is often used by Polish migrants in reference to the diaspora communities of Poles living abroad in other countries. The choice of such a name was a brave decision in the early 20th century, since Poland was not an independent country at this time, and Warsaw was part of the Russian partition; Poles living there were often subjected to repression and cultural imperialism from the Russian authorities ruling the Vistula Land. Due to this, Polonia could not be registered officially until political changes brought about by the advance of German troops into Russian-controlled lands in the First World War.

Initially, the players played in black-and-white striped shirts, but in the spring of 1912 they switched to their now traditional design of all black shirts. This was credited to Janusz Mück, longtime player of the team, who bought the new tops. The explanation for this patriotic colour scheme was that it was a sign of mourning for the occupied and divided Poland. This devotion to tradition resulted in the club's popular name: Czarne koszule ("The Black Shirts"). The uniform's white shorts and red socks come from the colours of the Polish flag.

The club's first match on 19 November 1911 was against a strong local rival, Korona, and ended 3:4 in favour of Korona. Two years later, in February 1913, the Black Shirts defeated Korona 4:0. During World War I, German occupiers were slightly more liberal in their ways than their previous Russian counterparts, and allowed the official registration of sports clubs on Polish territory. Thus on 15 October 1915 Polonia officially became a football club, despite already existing illegally for four years prior to this event.

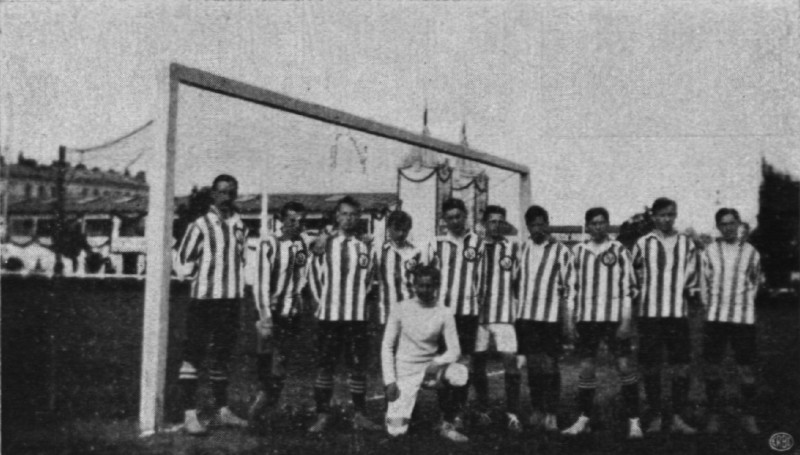
Polonia Warsaw, 1912

The first match between Polonia and its younger rival Legia Warsaw (formed in 1916) was played on 29 April 1917, ending in a 1:1 draw. It was the first historic "Great Derby of Warsaw" – the clash of these two rival teams from the Polish capital. A month later, there was a second match between the teams, ending with the same score. Hatred divided their supporters early in the clubs' history and continues to this day, driving strong emotions during the matches and sometimes even violence between matches.

==== Interwar period ====
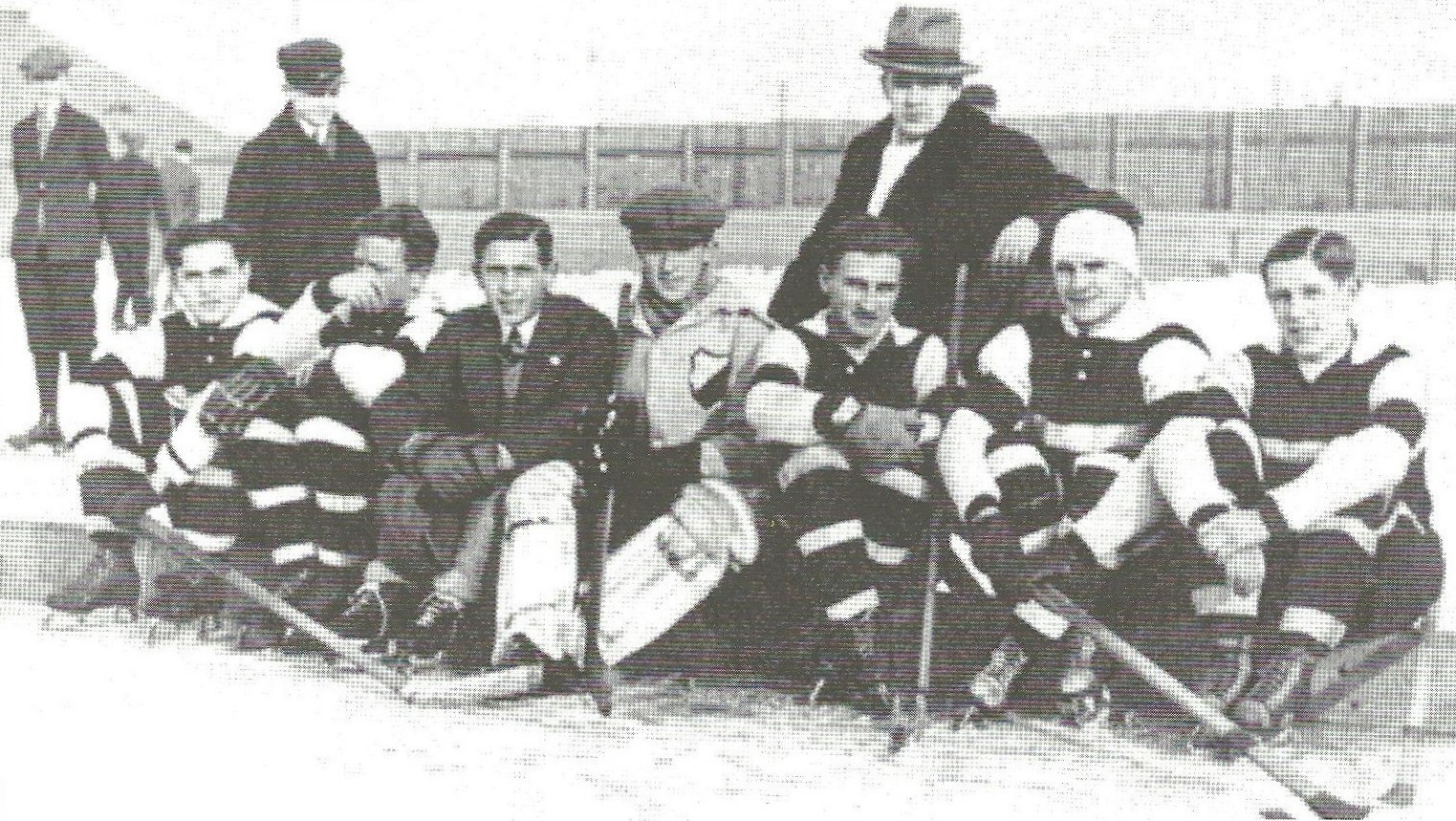
Władysław Szczepaniak (first from right) in Polonia's hockey team, early 1930s

In 1921, the Black Shirts came second in the first-ever season of the Polish football championship. In 1926, they also finished the season as joint-champions. Polonia was Warsaw's favourite club at the time – the great majority of the city's inhabitants were devoted Black Shirt supporters. In the late 1930s, Polonia became one of the powerhouses of Polish football, with players such as: Jerzy Bulanow, Władysław Szczepaniak, Erwin Nyc, and Henryk Jaźnicki capping for the national team. The friendship between Polonia and KS Cracovia – the prewar Polish football legend (formed in 1906) and the first ever champions of Poland (1921) – dates back to these days, when both teams readily accepted players from foreign nationalities and religious backgrounds in what was a highly politicised time for Polish football.

KSP achieved many successes during the two decades between the world wars, establishing itself as a club with sections in: hockey, athletics, football, fencing, tennis, volleyball, basketball, swimming, hazena, cycling, and boxing. Although the first match between the two teams occurred earlier in 1917, the official beginning of the Varsovian derby is dated to 10 June 1921, when the Black Shirts beat Legia Warszawa 8:0. The rivalry between these two clubs continued to grow in the interwar period, during which they played against each other a total of 27 matches; Polonia secured 14 victories, Legia won 8 times, whereas 5 games ended in a draw. Construction of Polonia's own stadium began in 1925 and ended in 1928. Ten years later, the Union of Polish Sports Associations proclaimed Klub Sportowy Polonia Warszawa the best Polish sports club of 1938.

==== World War II ====
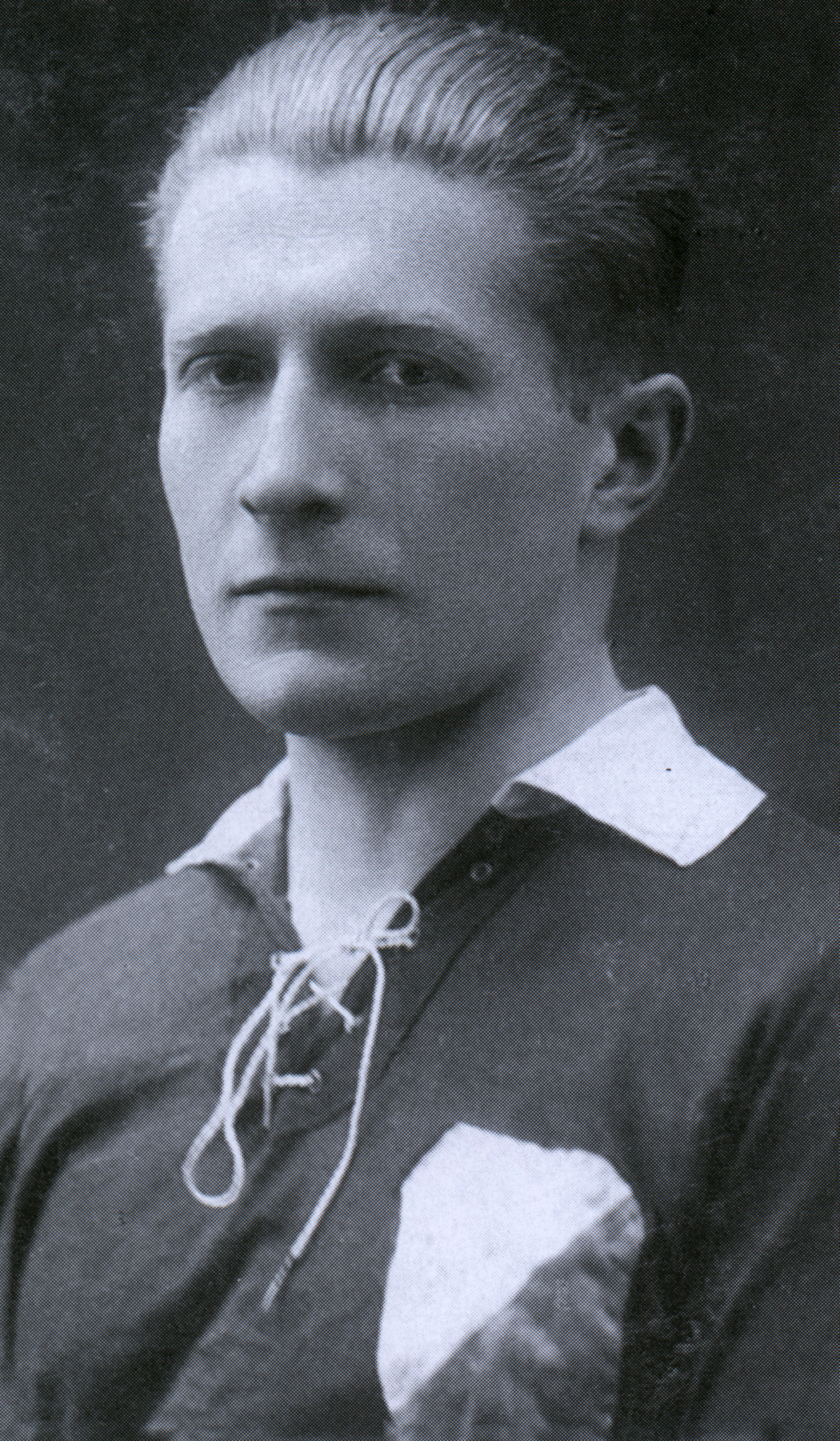
Co-founder and footballer of KSP Tadeusz Gebethner would go on to become a partisan in WWII

After the Second World War began, Poland was divided between the occupying forces of the Third Reich and the USSR. Warsaw ended up in the Nazi German occupied zone known as the General Government. Under the policies of Generalplan Ost and Lebensraum, Slavs were to become a race of slaves and eventually exterminated. Authorities of the German occupying forces thus forbid Poles from practicing sports; despite this, KSP continued to play illegally, taking part in various underground initiatives and winning the secret Varsovian Championship in 1942 and 1943.

Many of Polonia's players were involved in the resistance movement against the Nazis; some perished in concentration or death camps, some were executed, while others managed to survive the war. A prominent example is that of Tadeusz Gebethner, one of the club's founders as well as its first president and captain. An experienced soldier, he joined the Union of Armed Struggle (precursor of the Armia Krajowa) in 1940. Starting from 1942, Gebethner provided shelter to a family of Jews in his own home while risking his life as a member of the Home Army. He would go on to take part in the Warsaw Uprising, during which he was wounded twice. After the fall of the uprising he was transferred by the German forces to the Stalag XI-A POW camp, where he perished from sustained wounds on 14 October 1944. Tadeusz Gebethner was posthumously recognised as Righteous Among the Nations in 1981.

Pre-war footballers of Polonia, Adam Kogut and Julian Niemczycki, and athletes Wincenty Fryszczyn and Wacław Znajdowski, were among Poles murdered by the Russians in the large Katyn massacre in April–May 1940.

The Kazimierz Sosnkowski Stadium sustained major damage during the war, particularly during the Warsaw Uprising – since Polish insurgents used it as a battlefield against Nazi forces – and the systematic destruction of Warsaw that followed. It was finally rebuilt by the 1950s. Murals dedicated to the Polish partisans who fought against the German invaders have been painted along the walls of the stadium by the club's supporters in remembrance of these events.

==== The first Championship, the first Polish Cup, and relegation ====
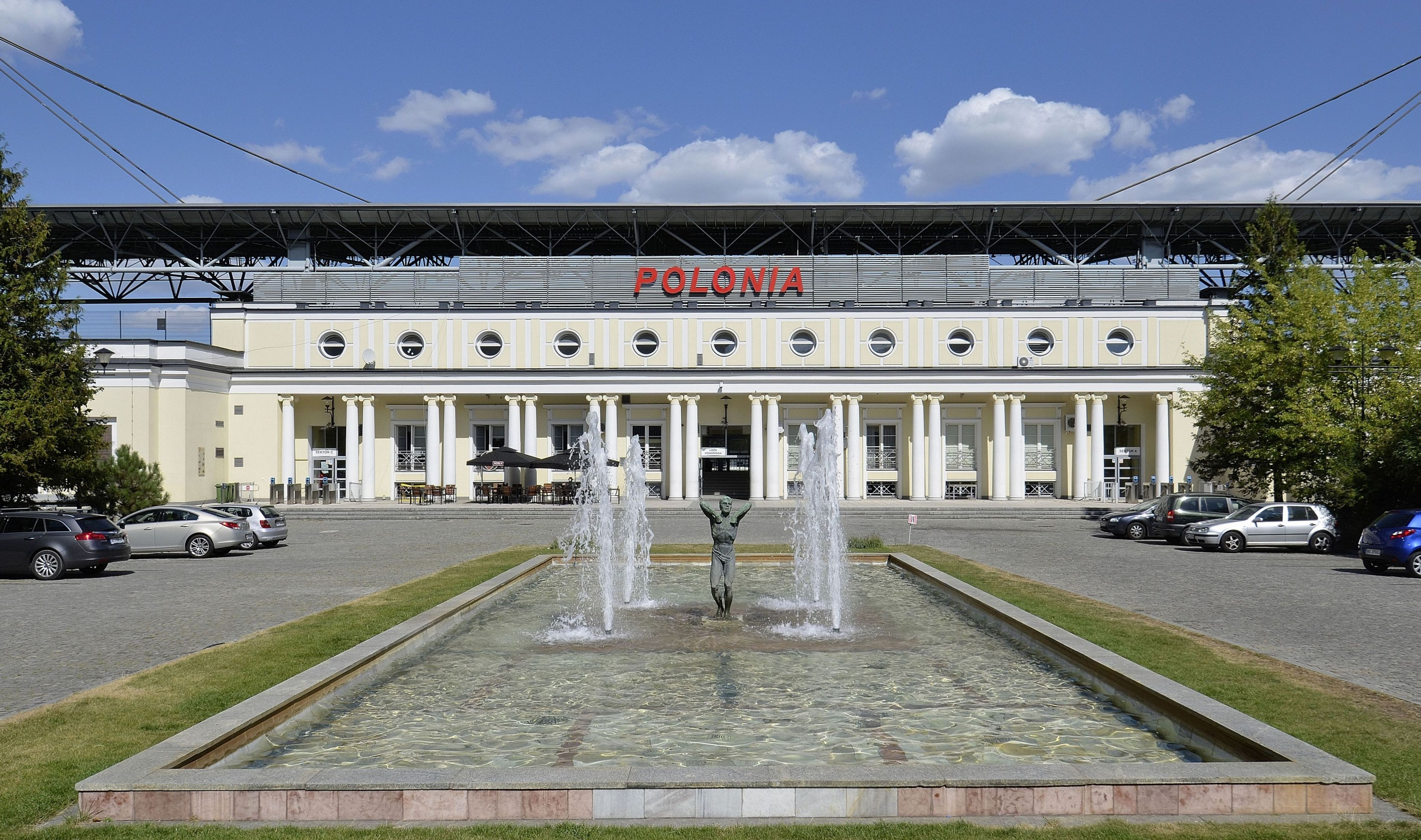
Front entrance view of Kazimierz Sosnkowski Stadium

In 1946, Polonia finally won the Polish Championship title. It was symbolic among the ruins of the bombed and burned capital. The final match was played on "Wojska Polskiego" Stadium (the Polish Army's – Legia's – ground) on Łazienkowska Street, because Polonia's stadium on 6 Konwiktorska Street (which lay close to the Jewish ghetto area) had been ruined during the war. The Black Shirts defeated AKS Chorzów in the final.

During the Stalinist period, Polonia's name and colours were changed; every Polish football club received a national sponsor, such as the army, militsiya, mining industry, etc. – Warsaw's oldest club was renamed Kolejarz ("Railroad worker"), as the team was now tied to the Polish State Railways. At the time, the railroad was one of the poorest sponsors, even choosing another club, Lech Poznań, as the main club they were investing in. Polonia's management also struggled to face the problems that the club came across, which contributed to its eventual relegation to the Polish second division. The traditional black shirts of the team's kit were banned, as the Stalinist regime was trying to erase everything which was associated with Warsaw from before the war. In 1952, Polonia Warsaw won their first Polish Cup. In the final, Polonia managed to outscore local rivals Legia Warsaw 1:0, much to the delight of Warsaw's fans, who would still continue to mainly support KSP until the 1960s. Several years after Stalin's death, the thaw in the politics of the Eastern Bloc allowed KSP to return to its original name of Polonia Warszawa in 1956.

Years later, there were still thousands of fans on Konwiktorska Street as nobody thought it would take 40 years for Polonia to come back to top-flight football, but Legia was becoming more popular and achieving greater successes. One of the reasons behind this was that all the young men, promising footballers to be from all over Poland, and especially the Warsaw youth academies, were called up for compulsory army training, which in the PRL lasted about 5 years or sometimes even longer. Many of the players received an offer to play for the army-sponsored Legia Warsaw, which led to some of the biggest successes of Polonia's bitter rivals in the 1960s. To this day, many of KSP's fans attribute Legia's current popularity in Warsaw to the backing that the Legioniści received in the PRL regime as well as Legia's "stealing" of talented players.

==== Back to the top flight ====
In the 1992–1993 season, after 40 years of playing in the lower leagues, Polonia Warsaw was finally promoted to the first division again. However, the organisation of the club was insufficient to compete with the strongest clubs in Polish football – the biggest problems being a lack of money and no sound training base. After one season, the team was relegated yet again, but only for a year as in the 1995–1996 season Polonia Warszawa won promotion again. In 1996, Janusz Romanowski took over as chairman of Polonia, having just backed out from sponsoring local rivals Legia Warszawa, and brought the Poloniści back to Ekstraklasa. In 1998, the Czarne koszule finished runner-up in the top flight and in 1999 reached the semi-finals of the Intertoto Cup. Earlier in 1993, the club had also participated in the Bangladesh President's Gold Cup in Dhaka, in which they reached the final, but ultimately lost 1:0 to FC Petrolul Ploiești from Romania.

=== 21st century ===
==== The second Championship, the second Polish Cup, and another relegation ====
In the 1999–2000 season, Polonia were not considered challengers for the title. And yet by the end of the autumn round, the Black Shirts were leading the entire league. That team had two managers – Jerzy Engel (who later became the coach of the Poland national team, which qualified for the 2002 World Cup) and Dariusz Wdowczyk (former Polish international player). During the winter break, Polonia signed two talented players in Tomasz Wieszczycki and Tomasz Kiełbowicz. Financially, KSP benefited by securing a sponsorship from the Hoop Cola soft drinks producer that was popular in Poland at the time. In the spring round, the Black Shirts lost only two games and drew one.

KSP won the Polish Championship in 2000 after triumphing over Legia Warsaw at their rivals' stadium with a score of 3:0. Prior to that, the team also won a League Cup yet again beating Legia Warszawa away 2:1. In July, they confirmed their place as the best that year, by winning the Super Cup in a match against Polish Cup winners Amica Wronki by a score of 4:2. These were also the times of Emmanuel Olisadebe, a Nigerian footballer who migrated to Poland and eventually became a Polish football legend after acquiring citizenship and playing for the national team in 2000–2004 (thus becoming the first black player on the Poland national team); Olisadebe initially began his career in Poland with Polonia Warszawa in 1997 and remained there until 2001.

In the UEFA Champions League qualifiers, the Black Shirts won in the 2nd qualification round against Dinamo București (3:1, 7:4 aggregate), only to lose at the hands of Panathinaikos Athens (1:2, aggregate 3:4) in the final qualification round. Despite losing the battle for the Champions League, Polonia Warszawa started in 1st round of the UEFA Cup where they lost to Udinese Calcio twice with scores of 0:1 and 0:2.

Come the 2000/2001 season and the Black Shirts began to lose their form, playing poorly in the 1st division, yet still managing to win The Polish Cup. During the next few years, Polonia managed to stay in the top division, however finishing mainly in the bottom part of the table. During this time, the club was owned and sponsored by a longtime supporter, Jan Raniecki, a car parts company entrepreneur. Unfortunately, Raniecki died after a heart attack on 1 March 2006. His family, who inherited the club, were not interested in running and sponsoring Polonia, so the search for a new owner began.

==== Start of the JW era ====
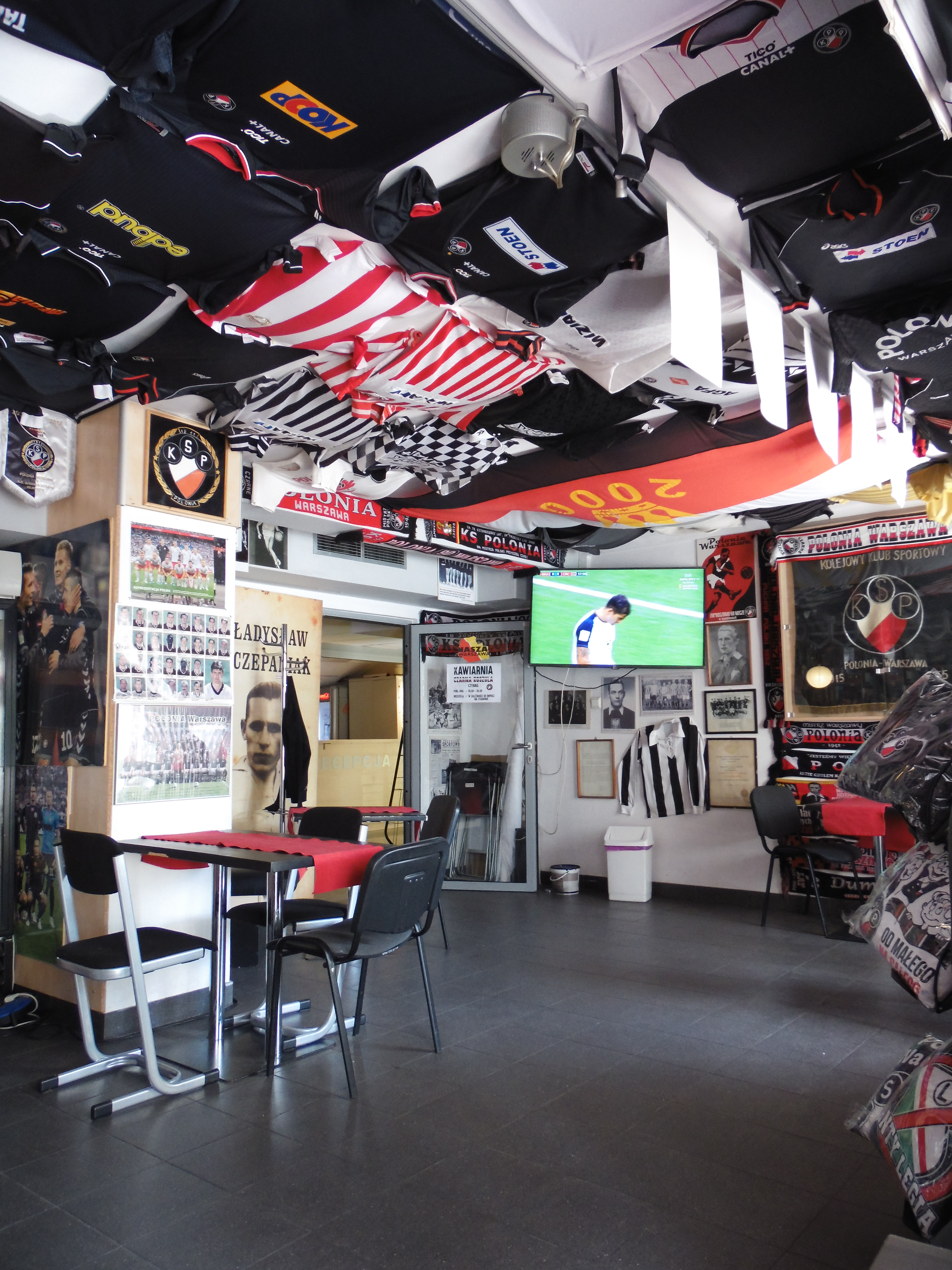
The Czarna Koszula (Black Shirt) bar has been at the stadium since 2007

In March 2006, the club was bought out by a new owner, Józef Wojciechowski, the owner of JW Construction, the biggest housing development company in Poland. The club budget was strengthened and, at first, it seemed that Polonia would quickly become one of the main forces in Polish football yet again. However, the club was relegated to the 2nd division after ending in last place in 2005/2006.

In the 2006/2007 season, Polonia struggled to get promoted to the 1st division again, coming close but ultimately failing, finishing in sixth place. There were reports in the newspapers that some older players in the squad were not interested in promotion, as they probably would have lost their places in the team had Polonia gone up. In 2007, a bar/cafe called Czarna Koszula (Black Shirt) for fans of the club was opened at the stadium by Paweł Puchalski, former KSP driver; featuring memorabilia from the team's history, it serves as both a social venue and a small museum for the club. The little pub, praised for its positive and friendly atmosphere, has positive ratings and over the years became an important meeting place for the fans, players, and staff of Polonia alike.

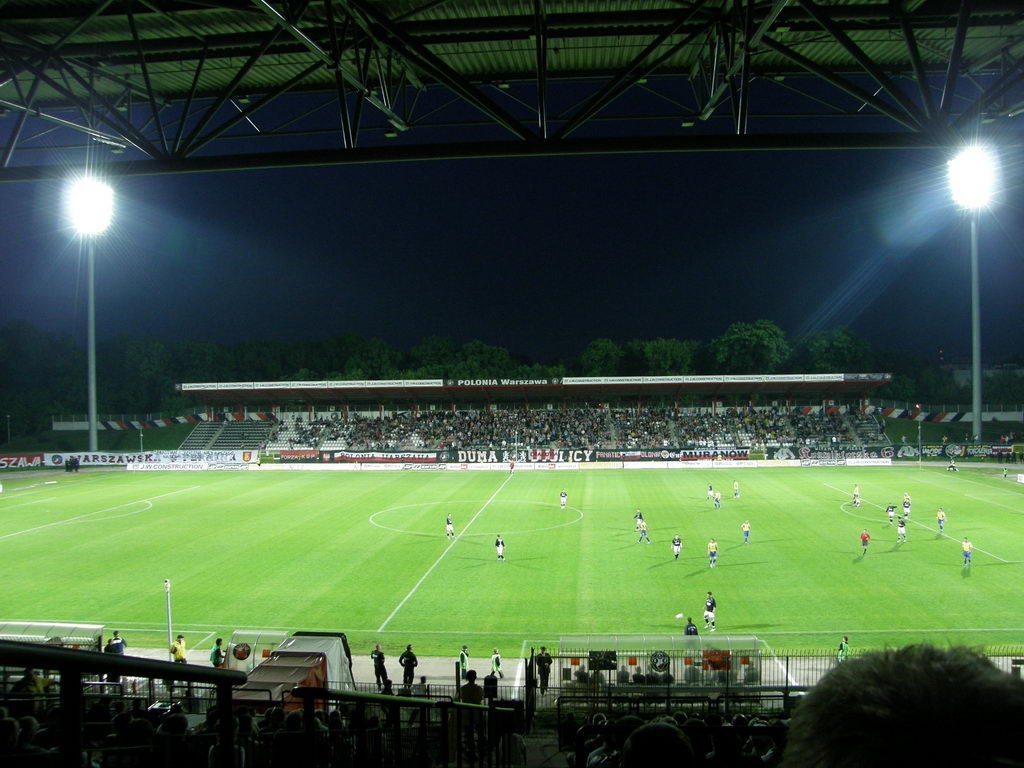
Home game with Arka Gdynia in May 2008

In July 2008, Polonia Warsaw merged with Dyskobolia Grodzisk Wielkopolski (3rd in the Ekstraklasa in 2007/08) and took over its place in the Polish top division. Most of Dyskobolia's players moved to Warsaw to form the core of Polonia's new team. Several players from Polonia's old squad stayed in the club too. The team managed to finish 4th at the end of the 2008/2009 season, and subsequently reached the 3rd qualification round of the Europa League. After beating Budućnost Podgorica 2:1 and winning 5:9 against Juvenes/Dogana, Polonia gave in 1:4 to the Dutch side NAC Breda during the 2009–10 UEFA Europa League.

In 2009/2010, after several changes in managerial positions, and with the team performing below expectations (15th place – mid-season), the club chairman Józef Wojciechowski decided to employ the former FC Barcelona captain José Mari Bakero as manager. Although the team was last in the league at that point, Bakero managed to save the season by avoiding relegation and winning against the local rivals Legia Warszawa for the first time in 10 years. It was also Polonia's first win against its bitter rivals at home in 60 years, sending supporters into the summer break ecstatic.

==== 100th birthday and end of JW ====
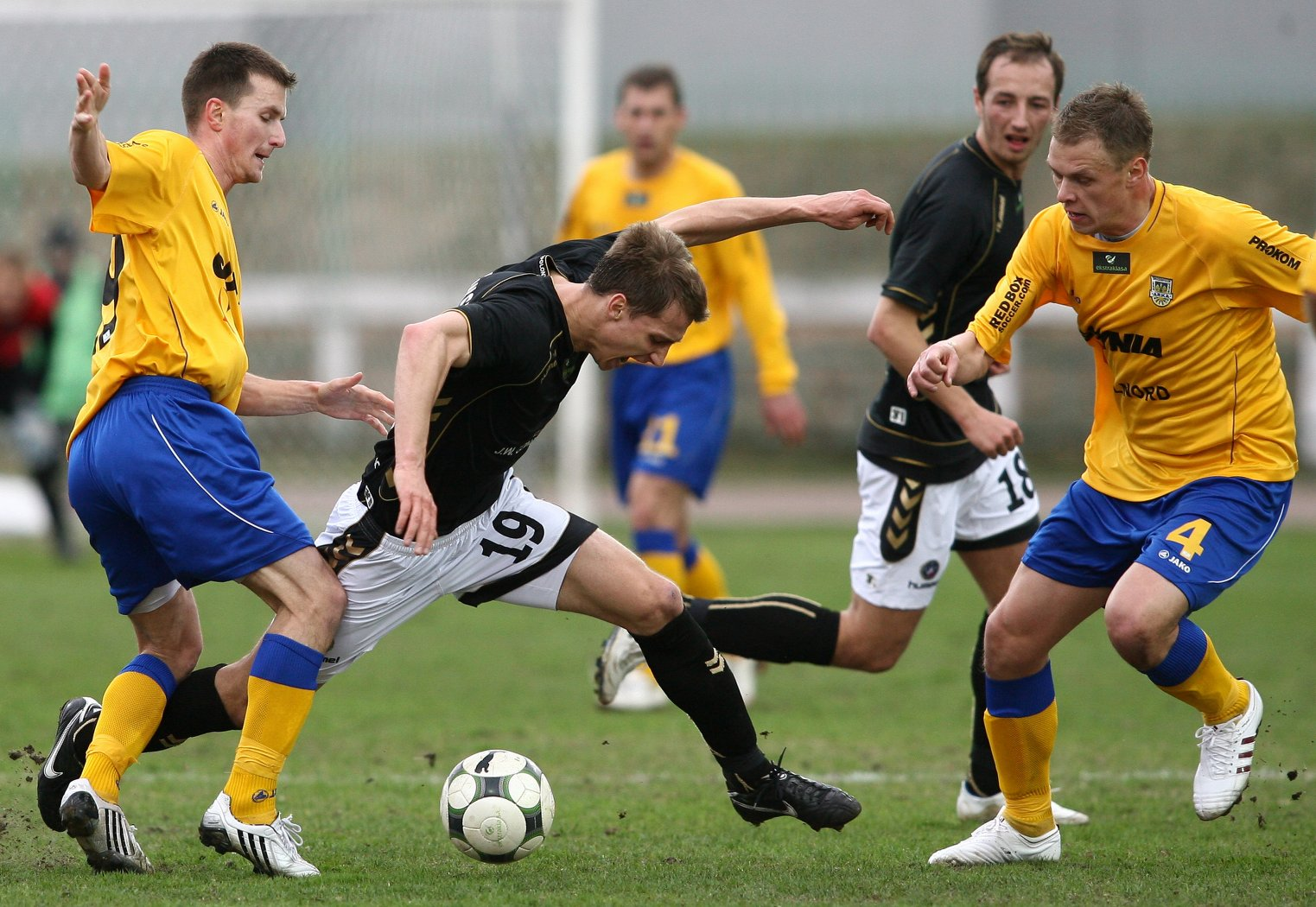
Polonia Warszawa vs Arka Gdynia (27.05.2010)

For the 100th anniversary of Polonia Warszawa's (season 2010/11), its owner Józef Wojciechowski strengthened the squad significantly, by signing 6 new players – including Ebi Smolarek and Artur Sobiech – raising the expectations and hopes of fans for the new season dramatically.

Things got off to a good start with 3 wins (including a 3–0 prestigious victory over Legia Warsaw) and a draw from 4 matches and first place in the standings. However, the press was reporting difficulties with the relationship between the team owner and the coach. After suffering the first defeat of the season to Korona Kielce at home, Józef Wojciechowski and José Mari Bakero parted company – against the supporters' wishes. The former Polish national team manager Paweł Janas, already working at the club as football director, was installed as a replacement for the Spaniard, signing a 2-year contract.

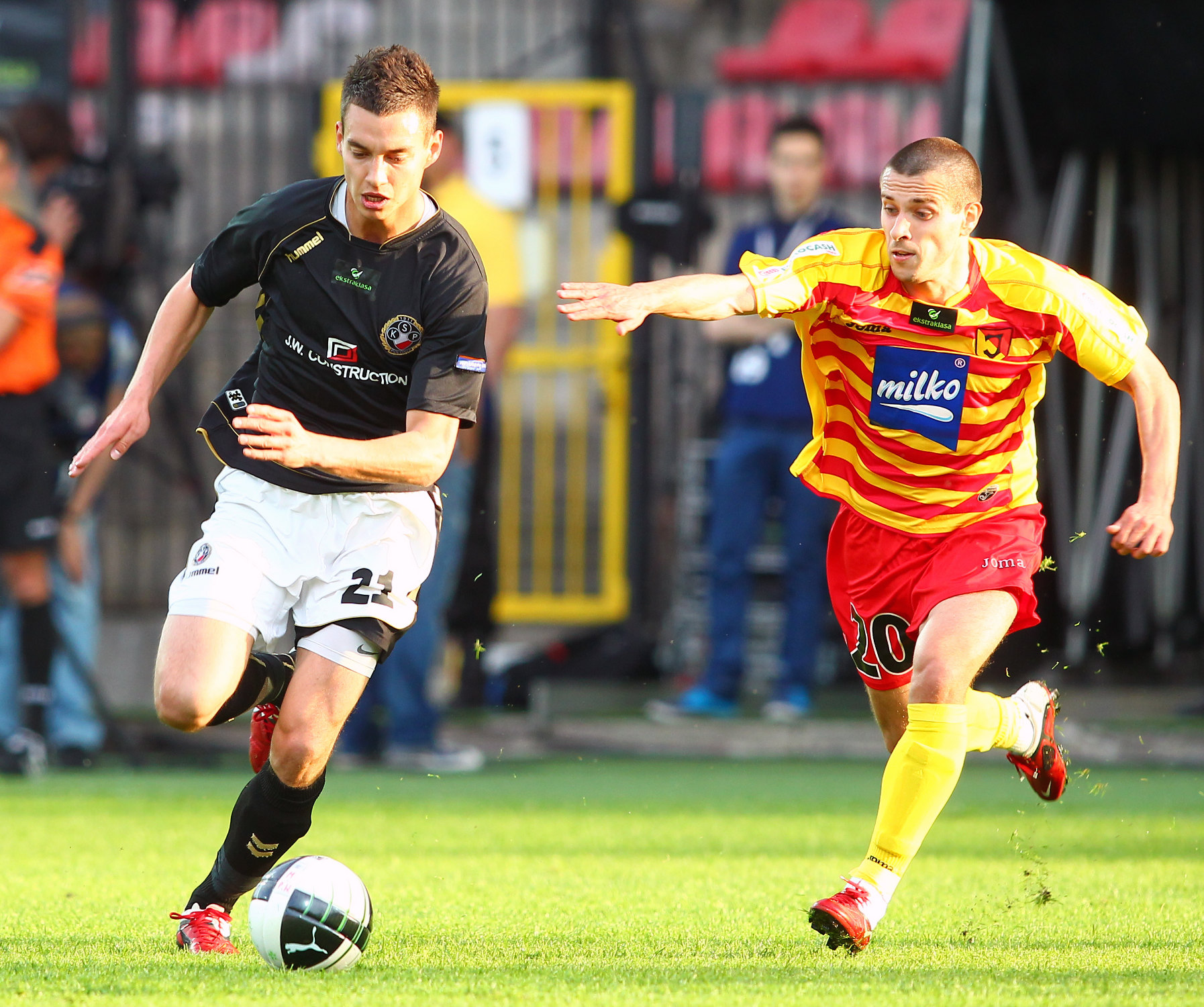
Polonia Warszawa vs Jagiellonia Białystok (10.05.2011)

It all went from bad to worse for Polonia from that point on. A string of unconvincing performances from the team left Polonia in 8th place, 10 points from the top of the table after the 1st round. On 6 January 2011, Dutch national Theo Bos was confirmed as the new manager of the club. However he lasted only 5 matches and was dismissed after losing in the Polish Cup and amassing just 1 point from 3 league games, leaving the club only 3 points above the relegation zone. Assistant coach Piotr Stokowiec had been promoted to the head role, but like his predecessors he didn't last long, being sacked after just one defeat to Widzew Łódź. Tarnobrzeg-born Jacek Zieliński, who had been sacked from Polonia Warsaw back in 2009 by Józef Wojciechowski, was appointed as the new head coach. Polonia won 5 out of 7 matches under Zieliński, saving itself from relegation, and finally finished in 7th place in 2010–11 Ekstraklasa. On 6 June 2011, Polonia's star playmaker Adrian Mierzejewski was sold to Trabzonspor for a record fee in Polish football history of 21 million zł (5,3 mln euro). On 11 October 2011, Polish football legend Włodzimierz Lubański was appointed as vice-chairman/sports director to relieve Józef Wojciechowski of his duties, in order to secure Polonia's immediate future. Lubański lasted a mere 3 months.

To celebrate the 100th anniversary of Polonia Warsaw in 2011, the National Bank of Poland issued commemorative general circulation 2 zł and 5 zł coins, depicting the club's crest. This was the first such honour for a football club in Poland.

On 28 March 2012, Jacek Zieliński was replaced by Czesław Michniewicz as KSP's manager. Despite a 3–0 victory over champions to be Śląsk Wrocław in his debut, Michniewicz had a string of poor results and failed to win the title; worse yet, Polonia failed to qualify for the European league, finishing "only" 6th in the Ekstraklasa. For Józef Wojciechowski this was too much and he decided to withdraw from football altogether, offloading the club to Ireneusz Król in July after an unseen by European standards deconstruction of the team in which over 15 players left; the club ceased to exist for a week, ending the "JW era" on a massive low and causing an outpouring of hatred from fans for Wojciechowski due to his capricious decisions.

==== Back from the dead, only to fall with the "King" ====
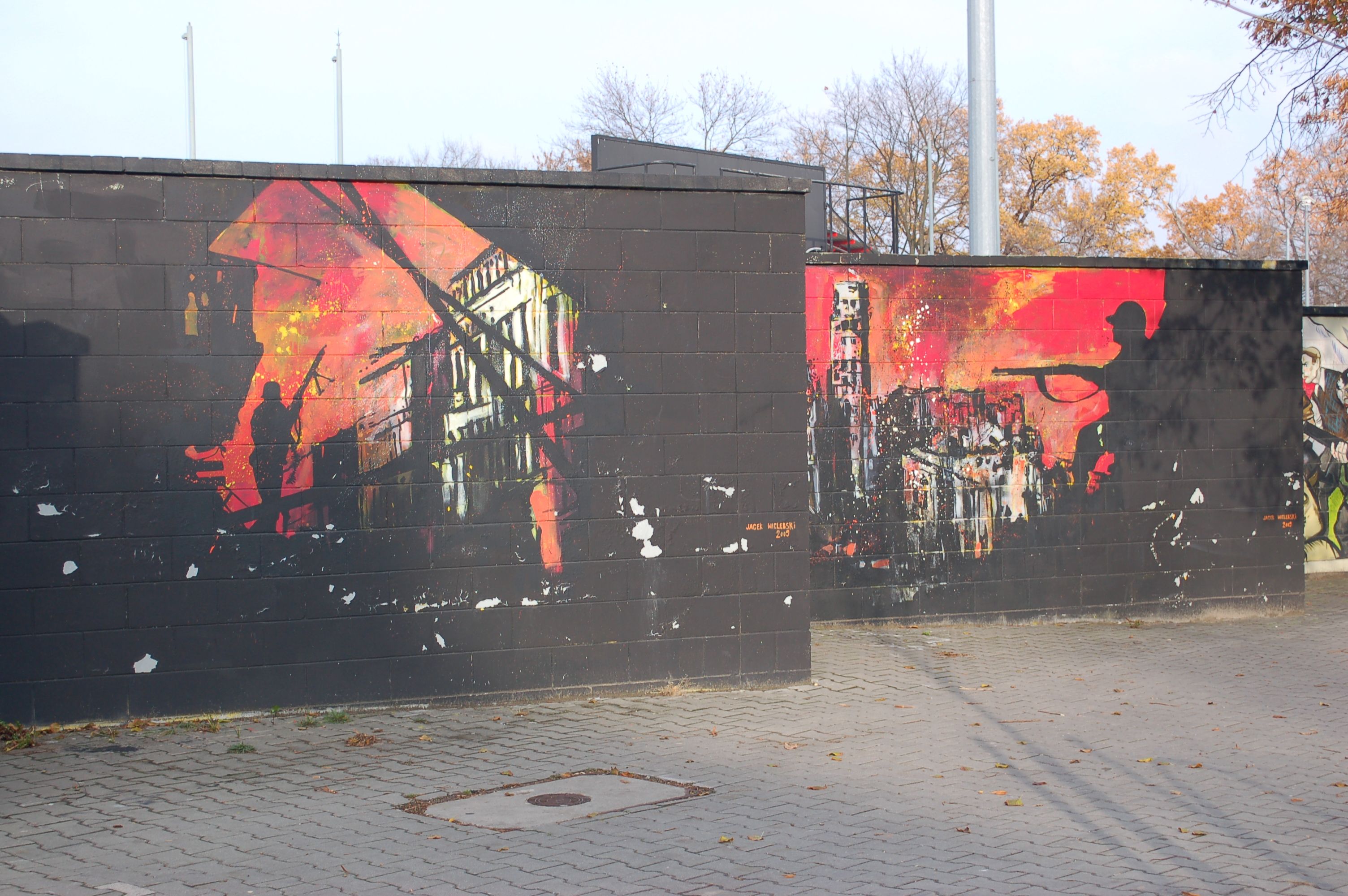
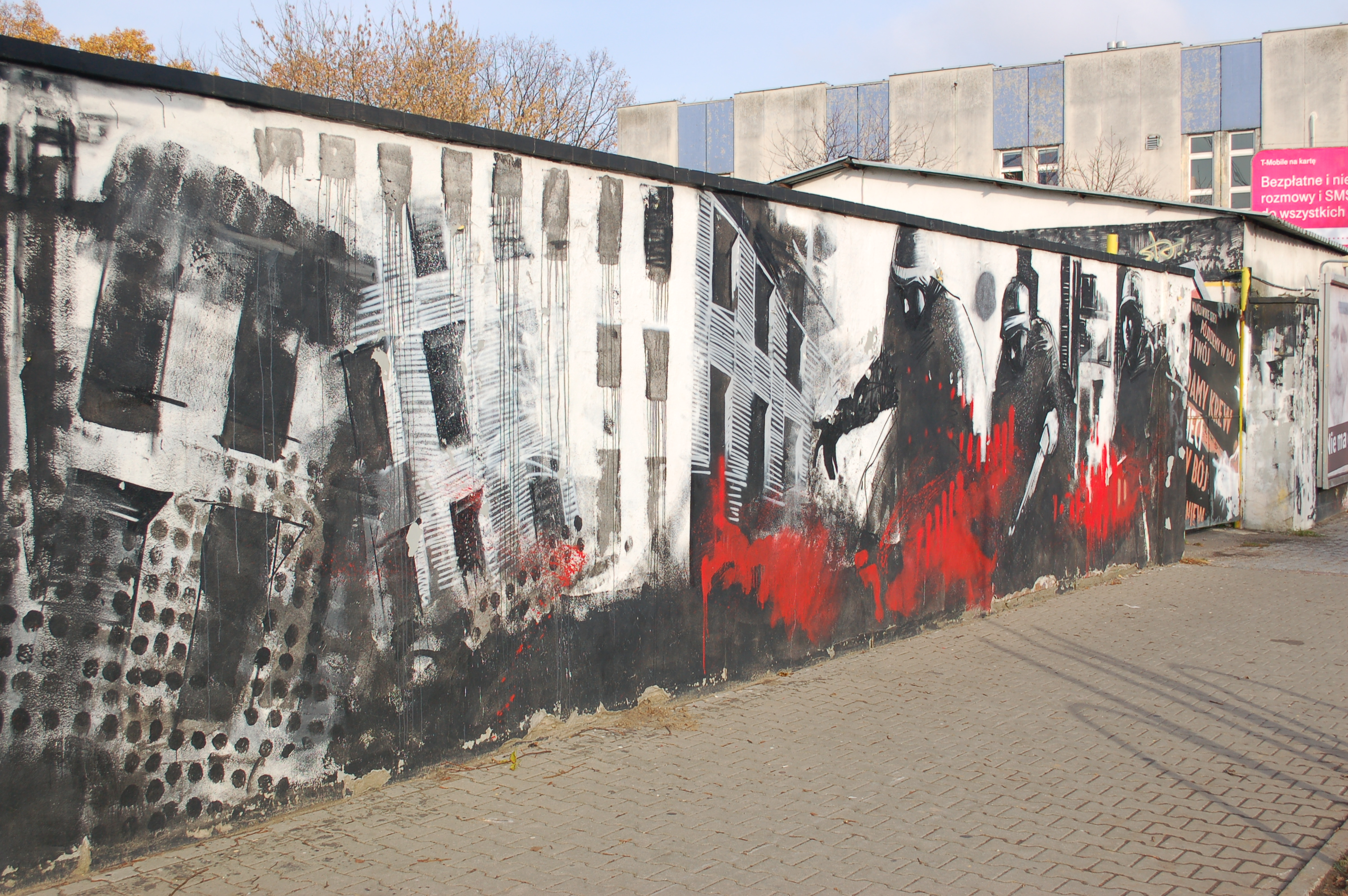
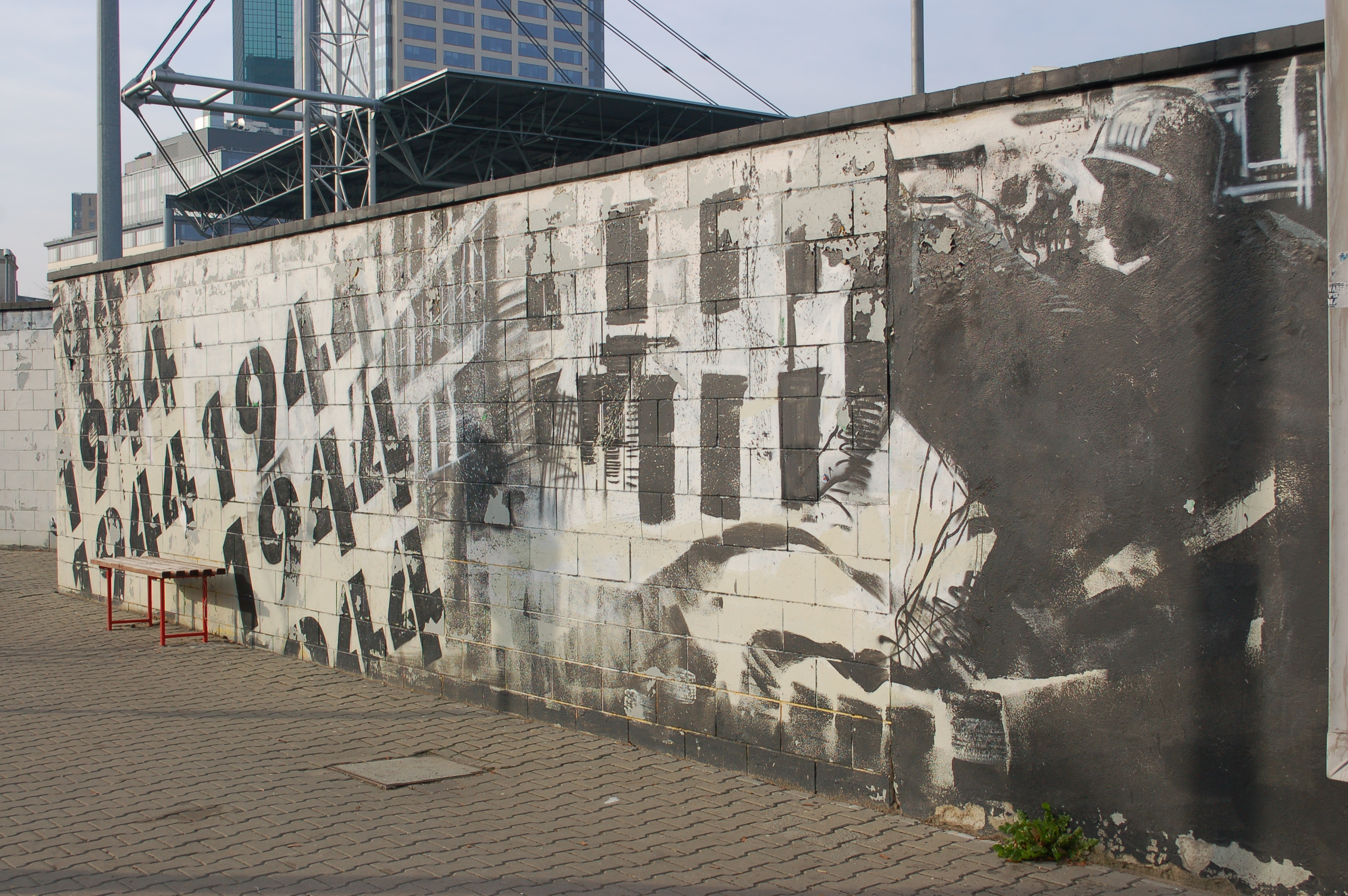
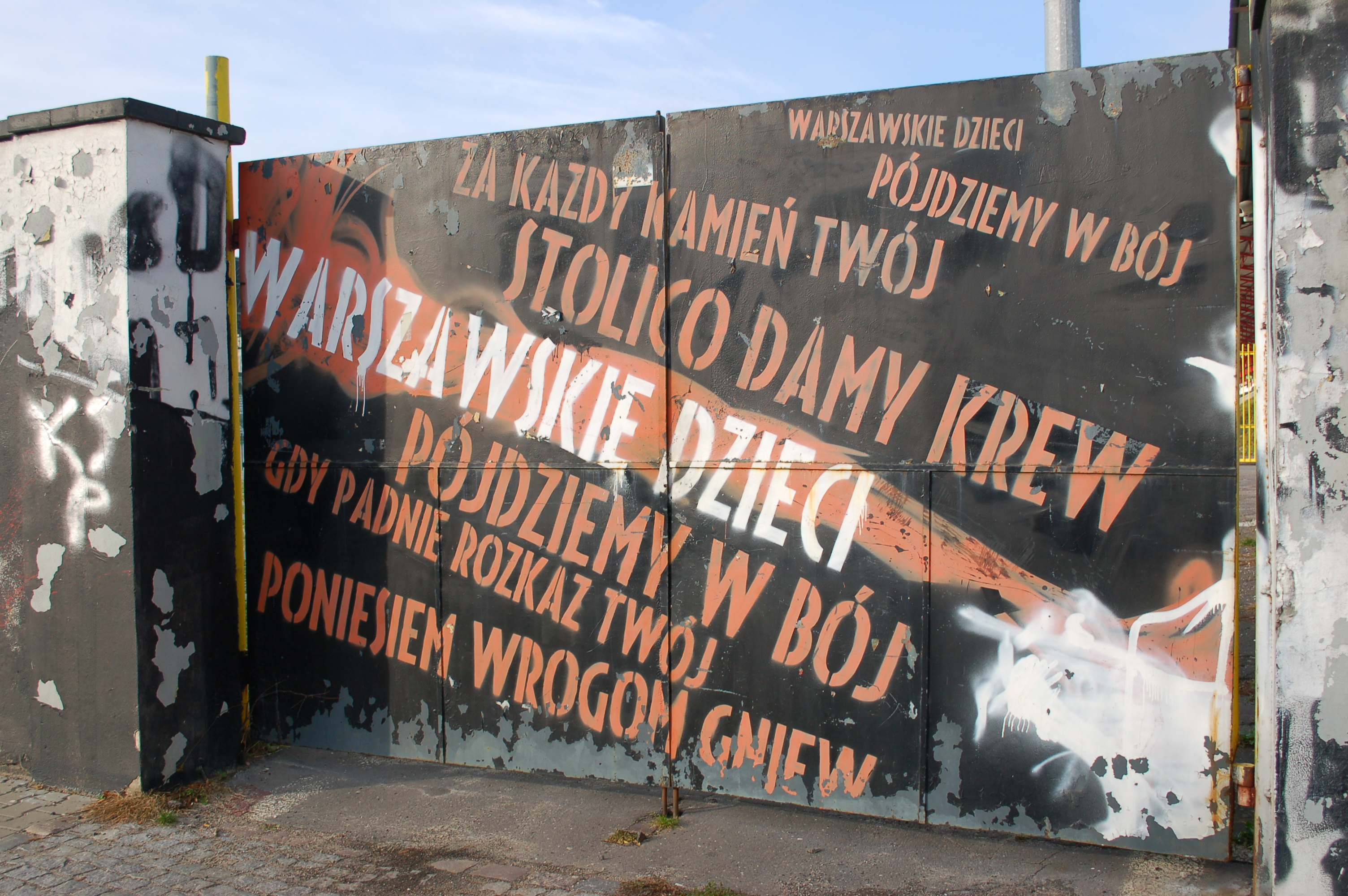
Warsaw Uprising murals at the stadium, November 2012

On 24 July 2012, a week after buying out Polonia's players to move them to Katowice, the new owner Ireneusz Król (his surname literally meaning "King" in Polish) acquired the rights to the club name and the emblem for a symbolic "1zł" and kept the club in its rightful place, despite rumours of a merger with GKS Katowice in which Król had "invested" in previous years. By then the youth coach Piotr Stokowiec was appointed as Polonia's first coach, and started building the new team based around literally 11 survivors from the previous season, mixing them with young (ME) talents and lower leagues players, notably the promising Under-21 Polish central midfielder Tomasz Hołota was signed.

Mid-season however, with Polonia surprisingly sitting in 3rd place in Ekstraklasa, merit to young coach Piotr Stokowiec, the worst possible scenario turned out to be true as Król was revealed as a financially unreliable owner. Delays in contract payments caused a repeat of the turmoil from the summer; in 2013 Polonia lost more than half of its first team again, and nearly all the high-priced players left on free transfers. Adding insult to injury, Polonia's star players joined main title rivals, Georgian National striker Vladimir Dvalishvili and influential winger Tomasz Brzyski switched to Legia Warsaw, whereas young talented Poland national poacher Łukasz Teodorczyk joined Lech Poznań. Additionally KSP's enfant terrible and top scorer from the previous season, Edgar Çani, joined Catania – leaving Polonia with only one striker (of four at the beginning) to finish the season. Almost the entire defensive block was destroyed with Đorđe Čotra, Adam Kokoszka, and the experienced Marcin Baszczyński leaving the club; the recently signed midfielder Hołota escaped Król's mismanagement too.

On the positive side, Paweł Wszołek rejected a last-minute move to German outfit Hannover 96 to stay at Polonia till the end of the season. Sebastian Przyrowski and Łukasz Piątek – two players with around a hundred caps for Polonia (Przyrowski had 99, Piątek 122) – along with defender Aleksandar Todorovski decided to stay at the club a bit longer, despite the financial situation being very unclear and debts mounting. Manager Piotr Stokowiec, after the success of the first round, had to re-build the team from scratch again – just like he did at the beginning of the season, and both times he succeeded far above expectations. Among last-minute deals and loans of young talented players, Polonia surprisingly signed the experienced 23-year-old Estonian national defender Igor Morozov from Levadia Tallinn. Stokowiec converted a few players' positions to fill in the gaps, notably Polonia's only striker and new captain Daniel Gołębiewski was shifted to left-back, leaving Polonia with only midfielders to play up front.

Despite performances remaining at a high level, KSP witnessed a string of poor results mainly due to off-pitch troubles. On 3 April 2013, Ireneusz Król's "IDEON" filed for a strategic bankruptcy (with the possibility of an agreement). With increasing debts, doubts over Polonia's future existence were mounting as the licensing process for the next season coincided with the exact date of IDEON's financial debt clearing deadlines. There have been accusations of fraud on Król's part.

Despite efforts from the association of Polonia fans to regain control over the club to clear the debts with new sponsors and ensure KSP's survival, Król was not interested. On 28 May 2013, Polonia did not receive a license for the coming season in the Ekstraklasa, due to an outstanding debt of around 8 million Polish złoty. Subsequently, the club lost its place in the PZPN (Polish football association) ranks. On 17 June 2013, Ireneusz Król filed for bankruptcy of Polonia Warszawa S.A.. Due to the circumstances, despite finishing 6th in the 2012–13 Ekstraklasa, KSP automatically dropped five league levels to the lowest level in its 101-year history.

==== Another year, another resurrection ====
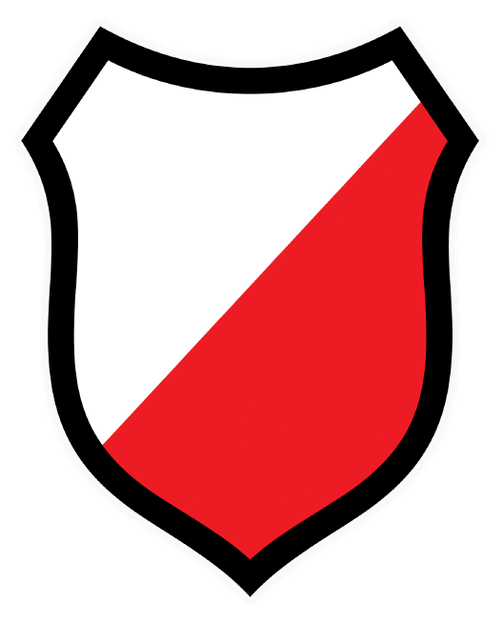
Polonia Warsaw crest used first in 1911–1933, then again after reforming in 2013 until the 2015 season

On 20 June 2013, the Mazovian Football Association (MZPN) confirmed a place in the semi-professional Mazovian Liga okręgowa (6th tier in Poland) for the newly formed Polonia Warszawa (senior) team, which was created by an association of Polonia's supporters led by Grzegorz Popielarz, and based on the youth players of MKS Polonia Warszawa, a local youth academy, which was not a part of KSP Polonia Warszawa S.A. (Ltd.) owned and destroyed by Ireneusz Król. Due to "sporting merits" MZPN along with PZPN (Polish Football Association) changed their previous decision, and Polonia was moved up one tier to the IV liga (5th tier in Poland) – the bottom of the professional league in the PZPN structure.

Piotr Dziewicki was named as the new manager, and along with sports director Paweł Olczak they managed to find and sign 26 players, within a month – most of whom were connected with the MKS Polonia academy recently or played in the main Polonia Warsaw team at higher levels before; the club managed to regain control over its stadium and restarted with its historical coat of arms (since the rights to the old official logo were still left with Król), as well as switching to a kit with black-and-white striped tops reminiscent of the club's pre-1912 colours.

The debut for the newly formed Polonia Warsaw team was set for Łomianki, a nearby town just outside of the capital. The game started very well for the Black Shirts, with the experienced Polonia legend Jacek Kosmalski (109 caps for Polonia) scoring only after 10 minutes, and Michał Strzałkowski adding another goal 5 minutes later. Unfortunately the game had to be suspended after 36 minutes, due to third party hooligans as fans of Legia Warsaw (supposedly supporting KS Łomianki) put up illegal banners, threw objects onto the playing field, and finally invaded the pitch in numbers, resulting in riots with the police and subsequently ending the match for both clubs.

However, only a week later, on 25 August 2013 the dream debut was realised. Polonia's community proved their worth organising an unforgettable footballing spectacle with the stadium at almost full capacity (unseen before at 5th tier football); during the match Polonia Warsaw's newly resurrected team beat Wkra Żuromin 6:0, with Michał Strzałkowski scoring a hat-trick, and more importantly leaving the thus far unknown Polonia team as the main title contender in the league. The team was strengthened mid-season, with experienced Mariusz Ujek replacing Kosmalski, joined by ex-Polonia Warszawa ME (youth) players that used to train with the Ekstraklasa team a few years earlier, notably Dominik Lemanek and Michał Gliński. Two Nigerian players, Adeniyi Lekan and Tony Uzoma Chukwuemeka, also joined the club to follow in the footsteps of KSP legend Emmanuel Olisadebe. Polonia speedily won the promotion to III liga in June 2014, with one game to spare.

Against the supporters' wishes, Piotr Dziewicki was let go, despite proving his worth, after the club and Dziewicki were unable to come to an agreement. Mid-season, at the end of 2014, more dubious decisions were taken by the club – after a very poor round with an almost unknown coach, Polonia hired coach Dariusz Dźwigała, only to let him go after just a few successful games. A few strong players were let go by the club with no official explanation: Błenszykowski, Gliński, and notably Lemanek as well as Szymanek left the club. Piotr Szczechowicz had a short episode as manager of the club, only to be dropped a few games before the end of a poor season. Club legend Igor Gołaszewski became the head coach for the last six games of the season (of which he won five). For the 2014/2015 season the club finished just above relegation, at 14th place out of the 18 teams competing in the Łódź-Mazovia group of the 4th tier of Polish football (the III liga).

==== Jerzy Engel & Co. ====
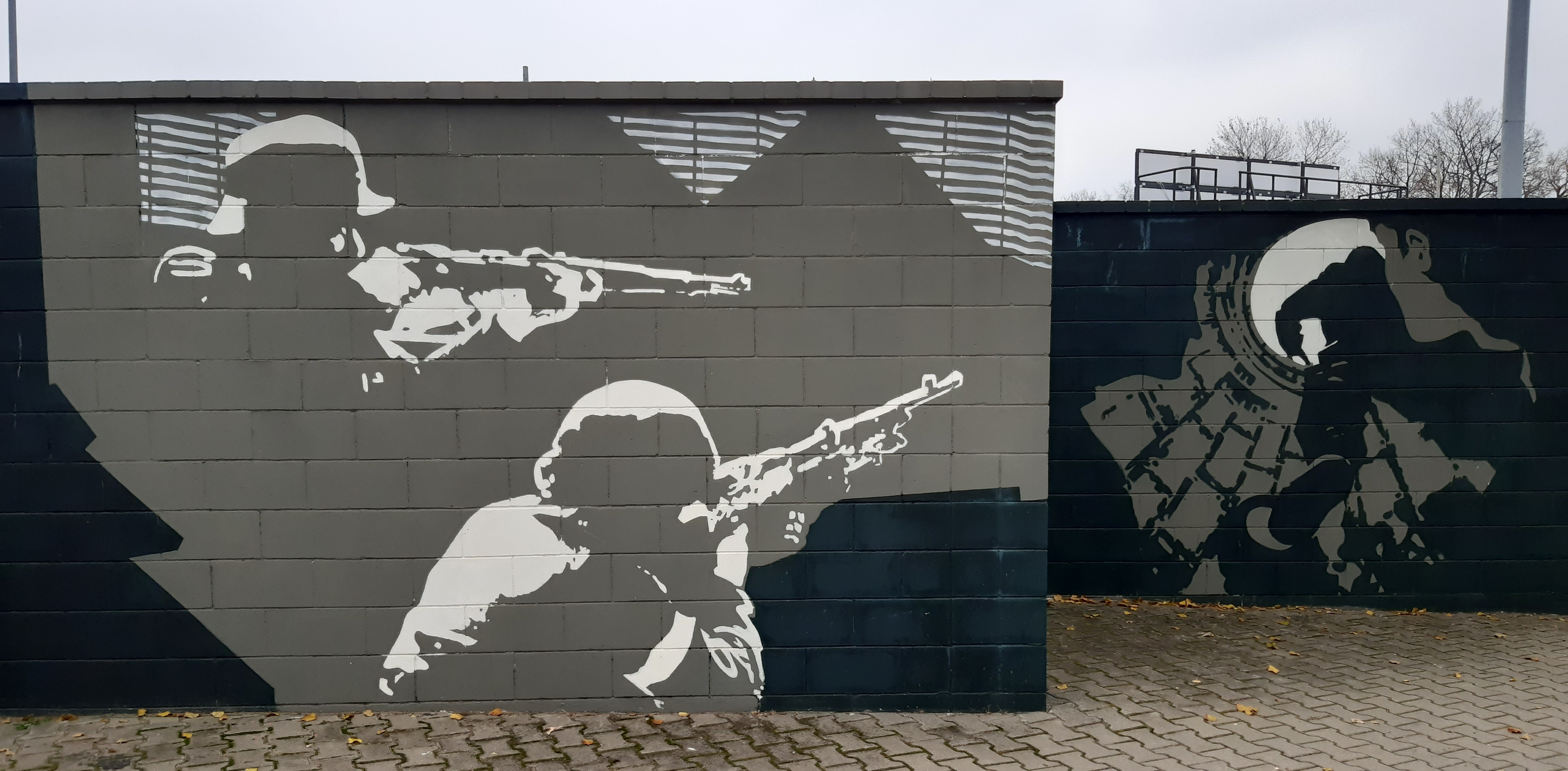
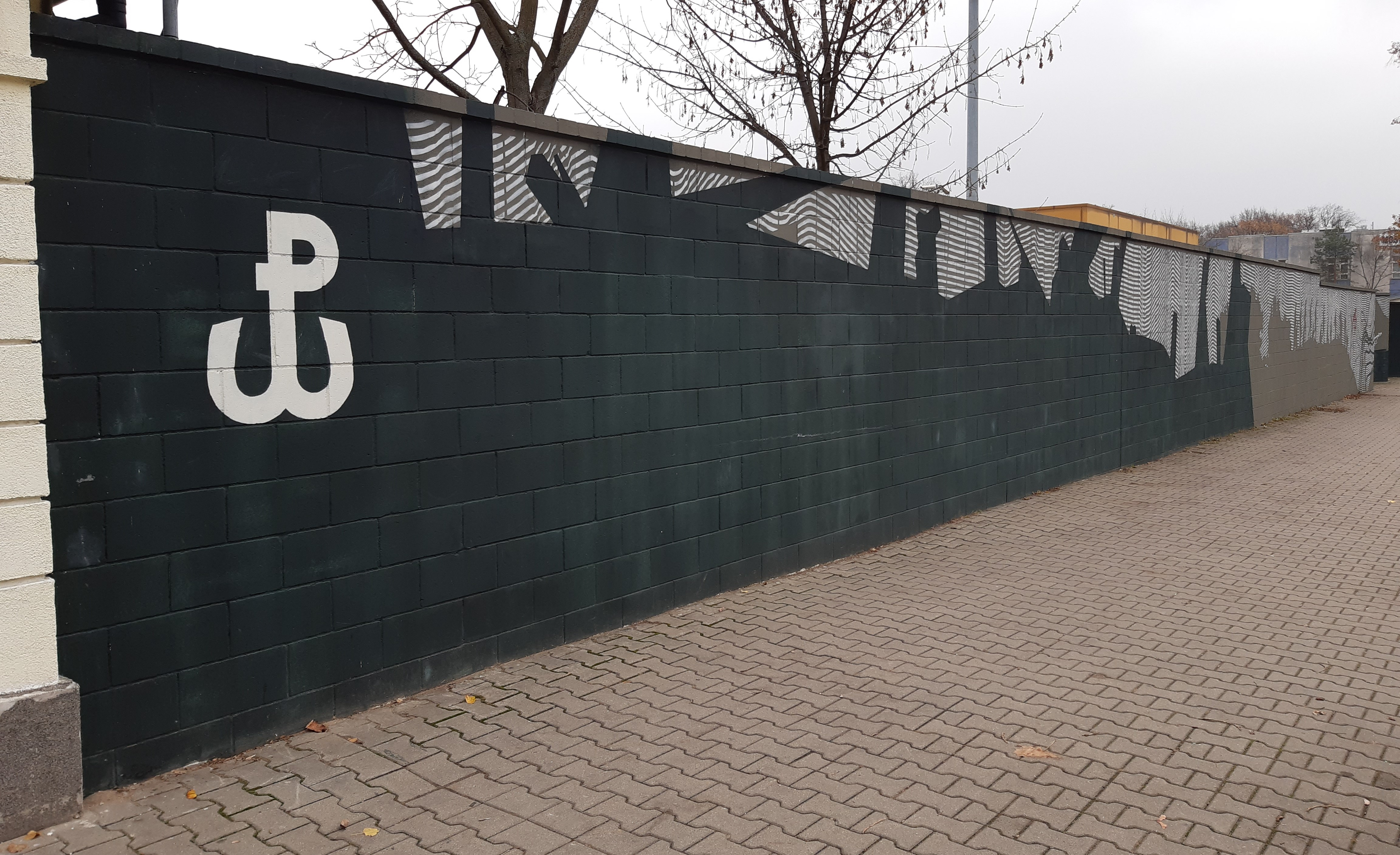
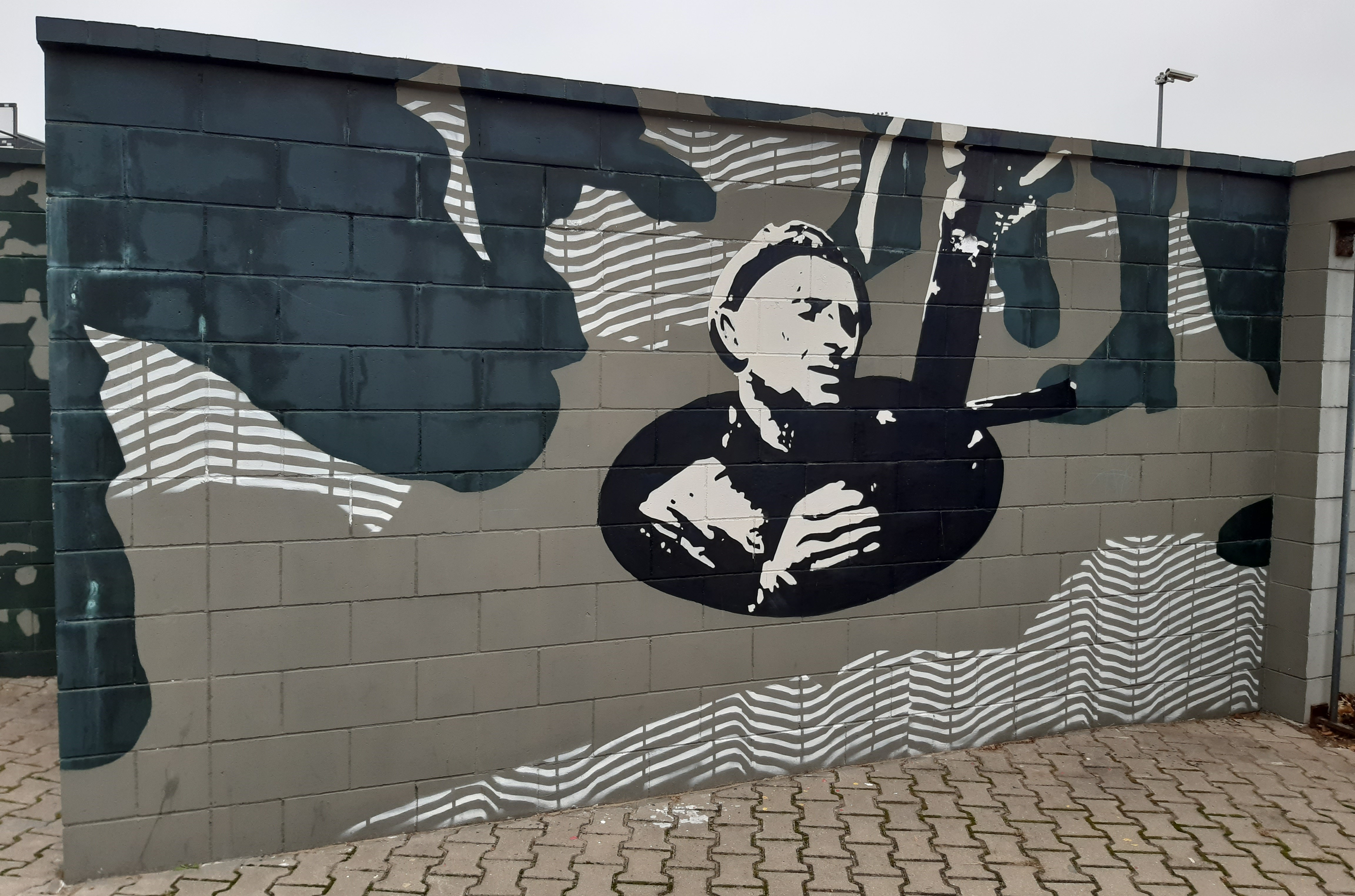
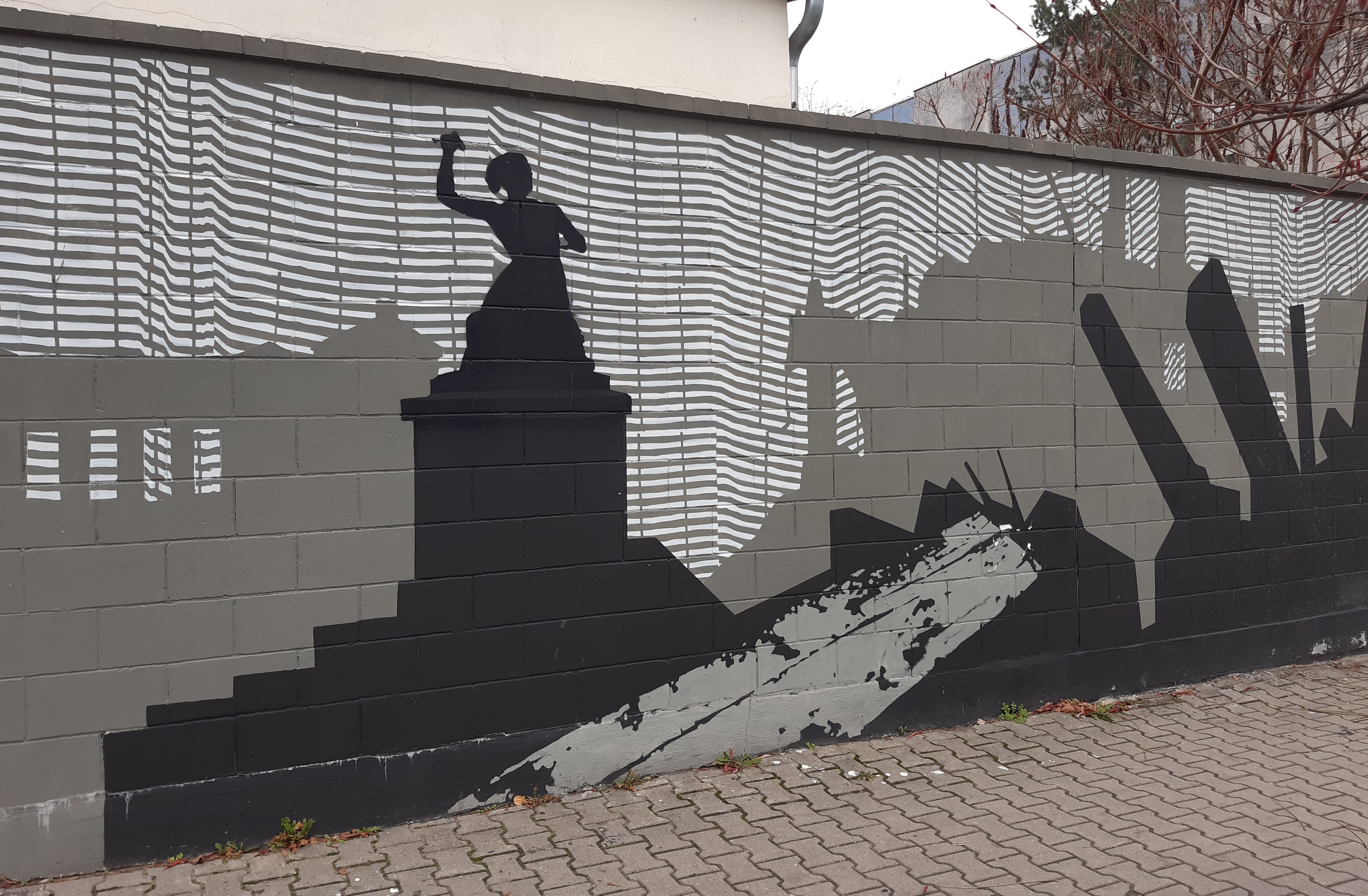
Murals at the stadium change over the years

On 25 June 2015, Polonia Warszawa S.A. (under the leadership of Jerzy Engel) took over the senior team from the MKS Polonia Warsaw Academy, which helped to reinstate Polonia Warsaw back from nonexistence, to the bottom-half of the 4th tier (III liga) of professional football in Poland. Under Engel the club returned to the previous emblem and the sponsor from the Polish Title winning season (1999/2000).

The stem of the team from the previous season was kept, Igor Gołaszewski remained as main coach. Wojciech Szymanek, Jacek Kosmalski, and Radosław Majdan all returned to the club as coaching staff. The club signed four experienced offensive players: Kosiorowski, Marczak, Truszkowski, and Obłuski to help Polonia in the promotion fight. Polonia Warszawa S.A. at their first press conference also made a strong intent of building a modern General Kazimierz Sosnkowski Municipal Stadium within five years (until 2020), with the goal of returning to the Ekstraklasa in the meantime.

In late 2018, Jerzy Engel resigned as the club did not see much sporting success and the club's finances deteriorated. The city authorities were uninterested in collaborating with the clubs shareholders to build a new commercially self-sufficient stadium to stabilise KSP's financial troubles, but opted for building a municipal youth centre instead. Hanna Gronkiewicz-Waltz, as one of her last decisions as the president of Warsaw, announced a design contest for the new municipal stadium at Konwiktorska 6 – Polonia's homeground, along with 158 mln zł reserved in the 2019 Warsaw budget to kick off the project. In May 2019, the results of the competition were announced with JSK Architekci (who already designed two other major stadiums in Warsaw) as the winners, with a 15,500 seat stadium and an open sports complex project, to be built at Konwiktorska 6.

Meanwhile, Polonia's finances crippled, the new chairman Peter Kaluba was unable to bring stability or financial backing to the club, and once again in recent history Polonia found itself on the verge of bankruptcy. To add insult to injury, the vice-president of the city Renata Kaznowska suspended works on the stadium in late 2019. Many players left the club with the final blow dealt during the break of 2020, when much liked coach Krzysztof Chrobak left the club along with the fan favourite footballer Krystian Pieczara – Polonia's top scorer of the last decade, the captain and number 10, who followed suit.

==== "Bonjour Grégoire" ====
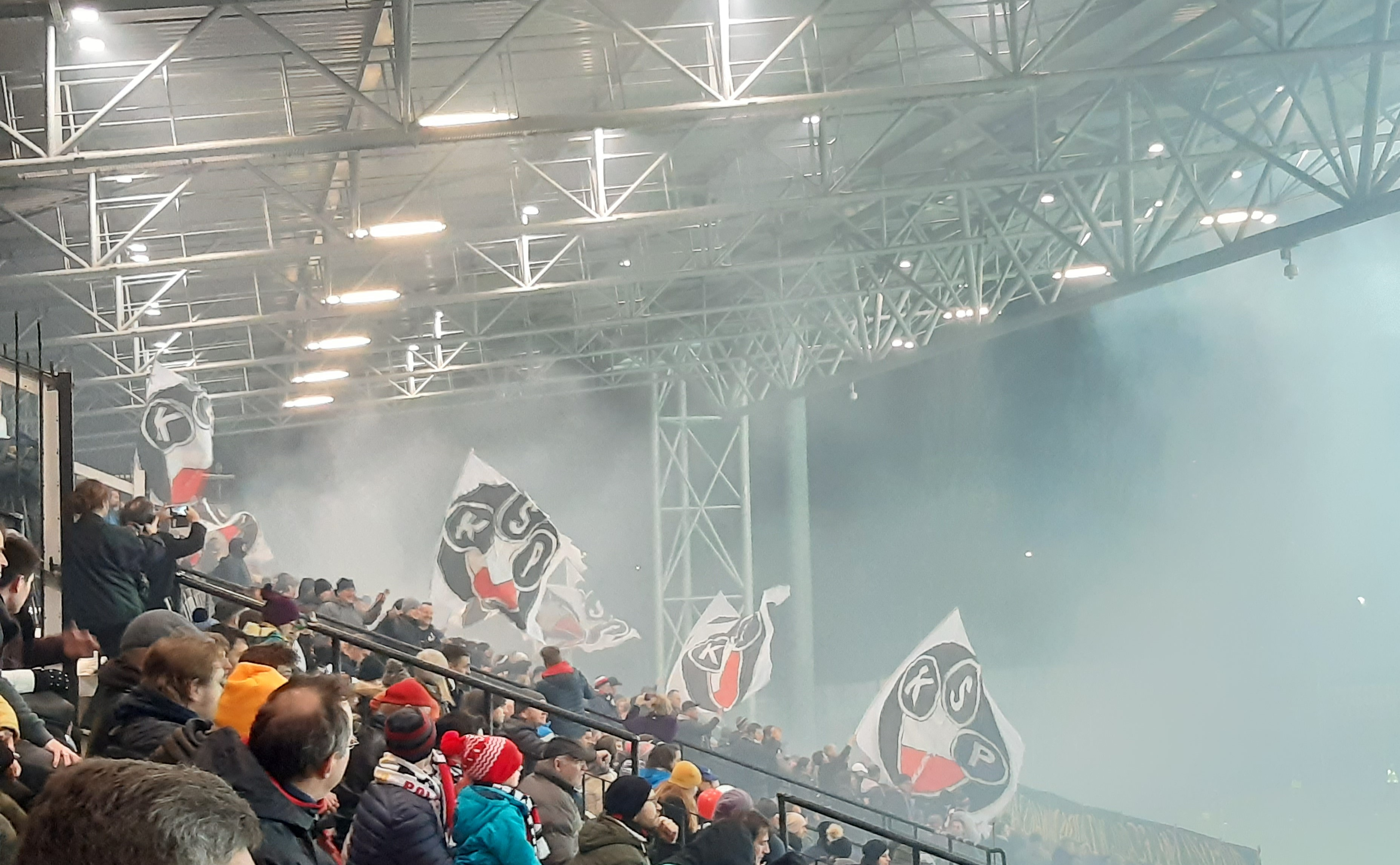
Fans supporting their club on its 110th anniversary

In mid-February 2020, Polonia's rival fans from Legia Warsaw launched media attacks on Grégoire Nitot – the chairman of the IT company Sii Poland, originally from France, who was negotiating a Polonia takeover. As a reaction, the Polish footballing community started an anti-hate campaign called "#BonjourGregoire", to welcome the support for Polonia. On 5 March 2020, Grégoire Nitot acquired the controlling stake of Polonia Warszawa S.A. from Krystyna Bnińska-Jędrzejowicz. On the 19th he was named the chairman, as all of the football came to a halt, due to the Coronavirus pandemic, with Polonia sitting in the relegation zone of the III liga. Wojciech Szymanek remained as coach, and on the 30 of April Piotr Kosiorowski was named as the sporting director, along with the presentation of ambitious plans for the future to reach the Ekstraklasa by 2029. By May 2020, with Polonia sitting in the relegation zone, WMZPN confirmed that no relegations would take place, despite the season coming to an end due to the COVID-19 pandemic.

After normal play resumed and the 2020–2021 season of the III liga ended, Polonia finished in 4th place out of the 22 teams competing in group 1. Come August 2021, after 64 years, KSP reactivated its women's football section. Due to Polonia's recognisable brand and long history, this move was seen as an important event in Polish women's football in general; Jacek Sękowski from Piastovia Piastów became the team's first coach. The Czarne syrenki ("Black Mermaids"), as the KSP women's football team is known, won their first sparring match with a score of 2:1 against AKS Zły. They continued their success in the league games, winning 6:0 against the reserves of AZS Uniwersytet Warszawski in their inauguration match of the IV liga mazowiecka and followed it up with another high victory of 11:3 against Świt Barcząca.

November 2021 brought Polonia's 110th anniversary, which was celebrated boisterously. The club and its ultras produced unique memorabilia for the event whereas the Poczta Polska introduced a special postage stamp for the occasion, which was designed by Agnieszka Sancewicz on fluorescent paper and printed in a circulation of 135,000. Thanks to fan initiatives: a new song was recorded; the Palace of Culture and Science, the National Stadium, and the Śląsko-Dąbrowski Bridge were illuminated in KSP colours; and messages were displayed on screens throughout Warsaw's public transport to remind the capital of its oldest existing club's history. Polonia triumphed 2:0 over Wissa Szczuczyn on the main day of the celebrations, ending the autumn round of games in a strong second position of the league table and leaving the fans in an ecstatic mood on the 110th birthday of the Czarne koszule.

The Polonia men's basketball team secured advancement from the second league to the first after a series of 36 victories in a row and not a single defeat, becoming the only team to do so in the season. The 2021/2022 season brought many more triumphs for the entire club, as the men's football team came first in group I of the III liga, finally returning after 5 years to the II liga. The victorious sold-out match between then-group-leader Legionovia Legionowo that finally put KSP in the lead attracted 5000 fans to the home stadium, and many online viewers, who took part in and witnessed a display of Ekstraklasa-level support. Success was also reached by the U12 group, the women's football team, and the men's reserves – all of whom advanced to higher leagues. In the 2022/2023 season, Polonia Warsaw was officially promoted to the I liga after defeating Olimpia Elbląg 2–0 and securing the title as leaders of the II liga.

In the 2024–25 season of the I liga, Polonia finished 6th and qualified for the playoffs for a chance at promotion, but lost in the semi-finals against Wisła Płock. Meanwhile, the club's U-17 team secured victory over Raków Częstochowa in the Central Junior League final and won the Polish championship.

== Supporters and rivalries ==
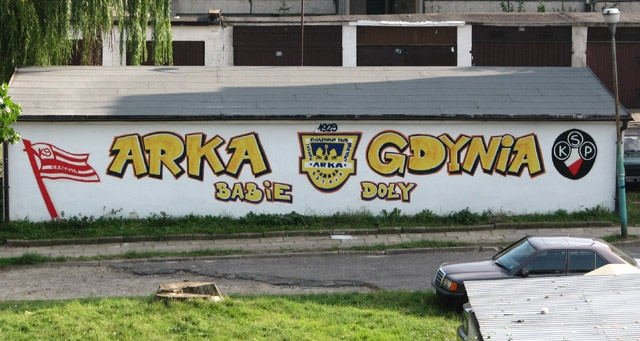
Graffiti of Arka Gdynia with crests of befriended clubs Polonia Warsaw and Cracovia Kraków

=== Friendships ===
The friendship between Polonia and KS Cracovia used to be the oldest in Poland (starting in the 1930s); though officially it was ended in 2017 due to disagreements between ultras, friendly relations between the clubs and their supporters persist. Polonia fans have friendships with fans of Sandecja Nowy Sącz and the Ligallo Fondo Norte group of Real Zaragoza. The antifa section of Polonia's supporters, known as "Black Rebels", maintained links with antifascist supporters of Partizan Minsk and Arsenal Kyiv.

=== Support and notable fans ===
The shirt number 12 is reserved for the club's supporters.

Famous supporters include Doman Nowakowski, Maciej Dowbor, Jan Englert, Michał Listkiewicz, Stanisław Tym, Kazimierz Górski, Krzysztof Ibisz, Marek Jurek, Grzegorz Jankowski, Wojciech Wysocki, Hanna Śleszyńska, Henryk Chmielewski, and Tomasz Konatkowski. Adam Bahdaj wrote a famous book entitled Do przerwy 0:1 (0:1 at half-time) which centres around local children playing football inspired by Polonia's team.

When fascist hooligan groups started becoming a problem in Polish football during the 1990s, some Polonia fans banded together to form an antifascist movement against what was happening on the stands. The first such group was known as Kibice Polonii przeciw faszyzmowi ("Polonia Fans Against Fascism"), formed in 1993, and was one of the pioneering of its kind in Poland. There were about 200 people associated with this milieu and they took on the name "Black Rebels" in 2011. In 2013, a series of physical attacks on the Black Rebels were carried out by far-right elements among KSP fans; messages of support for the Black Rebels from ultras and fans of various other clubs out-poured around Europe.

In August 2004, the Polonia fans adopted a black jaguar called Beata from the Warsaw Zoo, and rechristened her Beata Konwiktorska VI (a name that resembles the title of a queen as well as being an homage to the street address of the General Kazimierz Sosnkowski Municipal Stadium – 6 Konwiktorska). She lived at the zoo with her partner Kalim, with whom she had 7 cubs and 4 grand-cubs. The animal became a popular club and fan symbol. She was chosen as the most beautiful cat of the Varsovian zoo by internet voters in 2019. Aged 16 years and 9 months, she died on 16 January 2020.

=== Warsaw derby ===
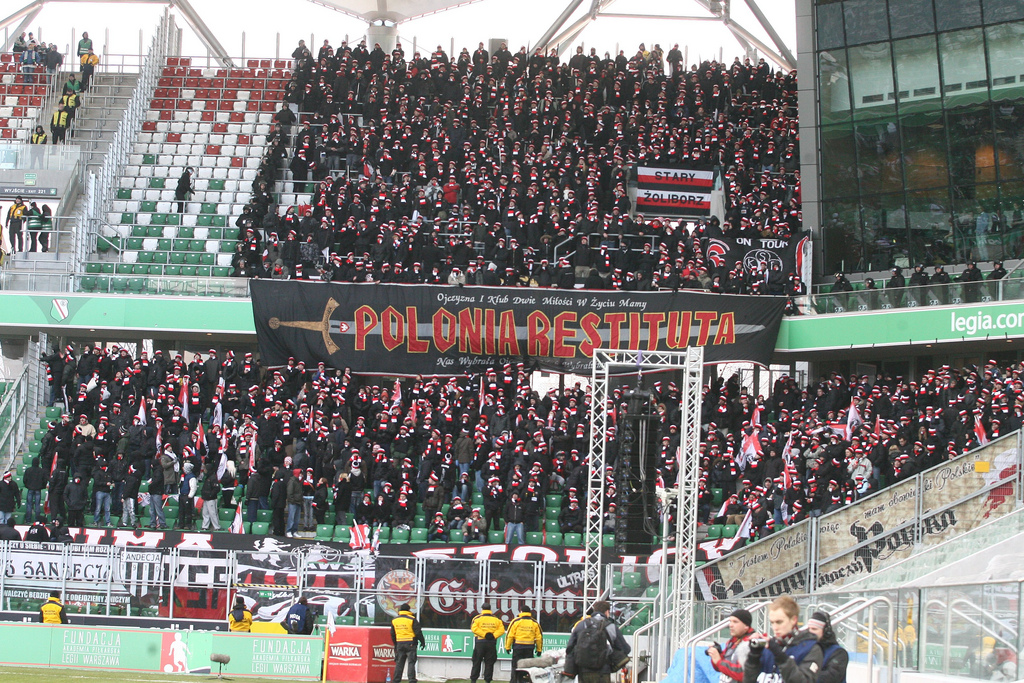
Polonia Warsaw fans during an away derby match with Legia Warsaw in 2011

The main rival is the local team Legia Warsaw with whom they contest the Warsaw derby. For many years, these two teams played in the Ekstraklasa. After Polonia's relegation from the Polish top division in 2013, the games of Polonia Warsaw against Legia Warsaw II became a substitute for such matches.

The matches between them currently stand at:

All matches
Matches	Legia wins	Draws	Polonia wins
78	29	20	29

== Honours ==
=== Domestic ===
- Ekstraklasa
  - Champions: 1946, 1999–2000
- I liga
  - Champions: 1992–93 (East), 1995–96 (East)
- II liga
  - Champions: 2022–23
- III liga
  - Champions: 2021–22 (group I)
- Polish Cup:
  - Winners: 1952, 2000–01
- Polish Super Cup:
  - Winners: 2000
- Polish League Cup
  - Winners: 1999–2000

=== Youth teams ===
  - Polish U19 Championship
  - Champions: 1977
  - Runners-up: 1991, 2000, 2005, 2008
  - Third place: 2001, 2015
  - Polish U17 Championship
  - Runners-up: 1998

== Polonia in European Cups ==
Season	Competition	Round		Club	Score
1997	Intertoto Cup	GR	(Denmark)	AaB	0–2
1997	Intertoto Cup	GR	(Belarus)	Dinamo-93 Minsk	1–4
1997	Intertoto Cup	GR	(Netherlands)	Heerenveen	0–0
1997	Intertoto Cup	GR	(Germany)	Duisburg	0–0
1998–99	UEFA Cup	1Q	(Estonia)	Tallinna Sadam	2–0, 3–1
1998–99	UEFA Cup	2Q	(Russia)	Dynamo Moscow	0–1, 0–1
1999	Intertoto Cup	1R	(Moldova)	Tiligul Tiraspol	4–0, 0–0
1999	Intertoto Cup	2R	(Denmark)	Copenhagen	1-1, 3-0
1999	Intertoto Cup	3R	(Hungary)	Vasas	2–0, 2–1
1999	Intertoto Cup	1/2F	(France)	Metz	1–5, 1–1
2000–01	UEFA Champions League	2Q	(Romania)	Dinamo București	4–3, 3–1
2000–01	UEFA Champions League	3Q	(Greece)	Panathinaikos	2–2, 1–2
2000–01	UEFA Cup	1R	(Italy)	Udinese	0–1, 0–2
2001–02	UEFA Cup	Q	(Wales)	The New Saints	4–0, 2–0
2001–02	UEFA Cup	1R	(Netherlands)	Twente	1–2, 0–2
2002–03	UEFA Cup	Q	(Malta)	Sliema Wanderers	3–1, 2–0
2002–03	UEFA Cup	1R	(Portugal)	Porto	0–6, 2–0
2003	Intertoto Cup	1R	(Kazakhstan)	Tobol Kostanay	0–3, 1–2
2009–10	UEFA Europa League	1Q	(Montenegro)	Budućnost Podgorica	2–0, 0–1
2009–10	UEFA Europa League	2Q	(San Marino)	Juvenes/Dogana	1–0, 4–0
2009–10	UEFA Europa League	3Q	(Netherlands)	NAC Breda	0–1, 1–3

== Managers (1992–present) ==
- (Poland) Mirosław Jabłoński (July 1992–June 1993)
- (Poland) Stefan Majewski (April 1994–June 1994)
- (Poland) Mirosław Jabłoński (July 1994–June 1995)
- (Poland) Stefan Majewski (April 1995–October 1996)
- (Poland) Jerzy Engel (July 1995–June 1996)
- (Poland) Mieczysław Broniszewski (October 1996–September 1997)
- (Poland) Dariusz Wdowczyk (November 1998–December 2000)
- (Poland) Albin Mikulski (December 2000–June 2001)
- (Czech Republic) Verner Lička (June 2001–May 2002)
- (Poland) Janusz Białek (May 2002–Nov 2002)
- (Poland) Krzysztof Chrobak (November 2002–March 2004)
- (Poland) Mieczysław Broniszewski (March 2004–June 2004)
- (Poland) Marek Motyka (June 2004–June 2005)
- (Poland) Dariusz Kubicki (June 2005–October 2005)
- (Poland) Jan Żurek (January 2006–April 2006)
- (Poland) Andrzej Wiśniewski (April 2006–August 2006)
- (Poland) Jerzy Engel, jr. (August 2006–October 2006)
- (Poland) Waldemar Fornalik (October 2006–October 2007)
- (Poland) Dariusz Wdowczyk (October 2007–April 2008)
- (Poland) Jerzy Kowalik (April 2008–September 2008)
- (Poland) Jacek Zieliński (August 2008–March 2009)
- (Poland) Jacek Grembocki (April 2009–August 2009)
- (Slovakia) Dušan Radolský (August 2009–November 2009)
- (Poland) Michał Libich (caretaker) (November 2009)
- (Spain) José Mari Bakero (November 2009–September 2010)
- (Poland) Paweł Janas (September 2010–December 2010)
- (Netherlands) Theo Bos (January 2011–March 2011)
- (Poland) Jacek Zieliński (March 2011–March 2012)
- (Poland) Piotr Stokowiec (caretaker) (March 2012)
- (Poland) Czesław Michniewicz (March 2012–May 2012)
- (Poland) Piotr Stokowiec (July 2012–18 June 2013)
- (Poland) Piotr Dziewicki (July 2013–August 2014)
- (Poland) Piotr Szczechowicz (August 2014–October 2014)
- (Poland) Dariusz Dźwigała (Nov 2014–December 2014)
- (Poland) Marek Końko (January 2015–May 2015)
- (Poland) Igor Gołaszewski (May 2015–March 2017)
- (Poland) Wojciech Szymanek (March 2017–July 2017)
- (Poland) Krzysztof Chrobak (July 2017–December 2019)
- (Poland) Wojciech Szymanek (January 2020–June 2021)
- (Poland) Rafał Smalec (June 2021–August 2024)
- (Poland) Grzegorz Lech (caretaker) (August 2024)
- (Poland) Mariusz Pawlak (August 2024–May 2026)
- (Poland) Piotr Stokowiec (July 2026–)

== Players ==
=== Current squad ===
As of 14 September 2026

Note: Flags indicate national team as defined under FIFA eligibility rules; some limited exceptions apply. Players may hold more than one non-FIFA nationality.

No.	Pos.	Nation	Player
1	GK	SVK	Henrich Ravas (on loan from Cracovia)
2	DF	EST	Märten Kuusk
6	MF	GER	Dave Gnaase
7	FW	ESP	Dani Vega
8	MF	POL	Oliwier Wojciechowski
9	FW	POL	Kacper Kostorz
10	MF	POL	Marek Mróz
11	MF	POL	Mateusz Młyński
14	DF	POL	Mikołaj Gorzędowski
15	DF	POL	Aleksander Gołoś
16	DF	POL	Jakub Budnicki
17	MF	POL	Robert Dadok
18	MF	POL	Kacper Ziółkowski
19	MF	UKR	Nikita Vasin
20	DF	ISL	Davíð Kristján Ólafsson
21	MF	POL	Antoni Kapusta
22	DF	POL	Paweł Olszewski

No.	Pos.	Nation	Player
23	MF	FIN	Simon Skrabb
24	DF	POL	Ernest Terpiłowski
26	MF	POL	Krystian Tabara
27	MF	POL	Sebastian Kowalczyk
28	DF	POL	Karol Gorzędowski
29	DF	POL	Michał Marcjanik
36	MF	POL	Tomasz Makowski
55	MF	POL	Damian Poczwardowski
63	FW	BLR	German Barkovsky (on loan from Baník Ostrava)
71	GK	POL	Mateusz Jeleń (on loan from Górnik Zabrze)
72	GK	POL	Adrian Sandach
77	GK	POL	Dawid Jankowski
94	MF	POL	Jakub Paszkowski
96	GK	POL	Mateusz Kuchta (captain)
97	DF	POL	Patryk Janasik
99	MF	TUR	İlkay Durmuş

=== Other players under contract ===
Note: Flags indicate national team as defined under FIFA eligibility rules; some limited exceptions apply. Players may hold more than one non-FIFA nationality.

No.	Pos.	Nation	Player
44	MF	POL	Benedykt Piotrowski

=== Notable players ===
Internationally capped players

Albania

- (Albania) Edgar Çani

Austria

- (Austria) Daniel Sikorski

Azerbaijan

- (Azerbaijan) Sasha Yunisoglu

Belarus

- (Belarus) German Barkovsky

Bosnia and Herzegovina

- (Bosnia and Herzegovina) Ensar Arifović

Brazil

- (Brazil) Bruno Coutinho
- (Brazil) Marcelo Sarvas

Chile

- (Chile) César Cortés

Croatia

- (Croatia) Branko Hucika
- (Croatia) Ivan Udarević

Czech Republic

- (Czech Republic) Radek Mynář
- (Czech Republic) Lumír Sedláček
- (Czech Republic) Pavel Šultes

Spain

- (Spain) Andreu
- (Spain) José Isidoro

Georgia

- (Georgia (country)) Vladimir Dvalishvili

Ghana

- (Ghana) Seth Ablade
- (Ghana) Annor Aziz
- (Ghana) Emmanuel Tetteh

Guatemala

- (Guatemala) Luis Swisher

Israel

- (Israel) Aviram Baruchyan

Lithuania

- (Lithuania) Tomas Žvirgždauskas
- (Lithuania) Donatas Vencevičius
- (Lithuania) Gražvydas Mikulėnas
- (Lithuania) Robertas Poškus

North Macedonia

- (North Macedonia) Filip Ivanovski
- (North Macedonia) Vlade Lazarevski
- (North Macedonia) Aleksandar Todorovski

Nigeria

- (Nigeria) Emmanuel Ekwueme
- (Nigeria) Martins Ekwueme
- (Nigeria) Benjamin Imeh
- (Nigeria) Kelvyn Igwe
- (Nigeria) Stanley Udenkwor
- (Nigeria) (Poland) Emmanuel Olisadebe

Poland

- (Poland) Mateusz Bartczak
- (Poland) Marcin Baszczyński
- (Poland) Arkadiusz Bąk
- (Poland) Krzysztof Bąk
- (Poland) Grzegorz Bonin
- (Poland) Tomasz Brzyski
- (Poland) Michał Chałbiński
- (Poland) Marek Citko
- (Poland) Dariusz Dziekanowski
- (Poland) Piotr Dziewicki
- (Poland) Dariusz Dźwigała
- (Poland) Jerzy Engel
- (Poland) Janusz Gancarczyk
- (Poland) Michał Gliwa
- (Poland) Radosław Gilewicz
- (Poland) Igor Gołaszewski
- (Poland) Daniel Gołębiewski
- (Poland) Tomasz Jodłowiec
- (Poland) Jacek Kiełb
- (Poland) Paweł Kieszek
- (Poland) Adam Kokoszka
- (Poland) Jacek Kosmalski
- (Poland) Marcin Kuś
- (Poland) Kamil Kuzera
- (Poland) Jan Loth
- (Poland) Stefan Loth
- (Poland) Antoni Łukasiewicz
- (Poland) Radosław Majdan
- (Poland) Radosław Majewski
- (Poland) Adrian Mierzejewski
- (Poland) Daniel Mąka
- (Poland) Erwin Nyc
- (Poland) Krzysztof Nykiel
- (Poland) Arkadiusz Onyszko
- (Poland) Mariusz Pawełek
- (Poland) Mariusz Pawlak
- (Poland) Łukasz Piątek
- (Poland) Dariusz Pietrasiak
- (Poland) Sebastian Przyrowski
- (Poland) Patryk Rachwał
- (Poland) Maciej Sadlok
- (Poland) Ebi Smolarek
- (Poland) Artur Sobiech
- (Poland) Marek Sokołowski
- (Poland) Piotr Stokowiec
- (Poland) Władysław Szczepaniak
- (Poland) Henryk Borucz
- (Poland) Maciej Szczęsny
- (Poland) Wojciech Szymanek
- (Poland) Wojciech Jagoda
- (Poland) Piotr Świerczewski
- (Poland) Maciej Tataj
- (Poland) Błażej Telichowski
- (Poland) Łukasz Teodorczyk
- (Poland) Jakub Tosik
- (Poland) Łukasz Trałka
- (Poland) Tomasz Wieszczycki
- (Poland) Paweł Wszołek
- (Poland) Mariusz Zasada
- (Poland) Marcin Żewłakow
- (Poland) Michał Żewłakow

Slovakia

- (Slovakia) Martin Baran
- (Slovakia) Róbert Jež

Serbia

- (Serbia) Đorđe Čotra
- (Serbia) Dimitrije Injac

== See also ==
- Sport in Warsaw
- Football in Poland
- List of football teams
