= Start Otwock =

Polish football club

- Full name: Otwocki Klub Sportowy; Start Otwock
- Founded: 1924; 101 years ago
- Ground: Tadeusz Ślusarski Stadium
- Capacity: 3,000
- President: Jacek Siekaczyński
- Vice-President: Iwona Kurdej
- Manager: Michał Suski
- League: Klasa B Warsaw II
- 2023–24: Klasa B Warsaw II, 11th of 12
- Website: http://www.oksotwock.pl/
Home colours	Away colours

OKS "Start" Otwock is a Polish football club located in Otwock, Poland. It currently plays in Klasa B, group Warsaw II. The team's colors are yellow and black.
