= List of Lechia Gdańsk managers =

This is a list of Lechia Gdańsk managers. The current manager is Vladyslav Lupashko who joined the club on 1 July 2026. Most of the managers through Lechia's history have been Polish, however in recent years more nationalities have been represented. Currently there have been 11 managers from countries other than Poland, the first being Václav Křížek (Czech Republic) in 1949, and most recently Lupashko (Ukraine) in 2026. Both Jerzy Jastrzębowski and Piotr Stokowiec could be seen as Lechia's most successful managers, with Jastrzębowski winning both the Polish Cup and Polish Super Cup in 1983, and getting Lechia promoted from III liga and II liga in successive seasons in 1983 and 1984, with Stokowiec winning Lechia’s second Polish Cup and Polish Super Cup, while leading the team to their joint highest ever Ekstraklasa finish of 3rd, all in 2019. The other manager who has the record for managing Lechia to their highest finish in the Polish league is Tadeusz Foryś who achieved the feat in 1956.

== Managers ==
The list of managers from 1949 is complete.

The first person to be classed as a head coach or manager of Lechia Gdańsk is Zygmunt Czyżewski who was in place for the first year after the clubs founding in 1945, while the club was in the regional divisions of Polish football. Czyżewski held this role while also being a player for the club, being the clubs first and only known player-manager. After Czyżewski left the role there are no known persons who held such a clear and defined role as "head coach" between 1946 until the clubs promotion into the Ekstraklasa in 1949. It is likely that during this time a player at the club also held the role of manager while playing, having a role similar to Czyżewski. By Lechia's own admission it was not until 1949 when the club made their first appearance in the Ekstraklasa did they have their first proper manager at the club when Ryszard Koncewicz was given the role.

In total there have been 64 different people appointed as manager of Lechia Gdańsk over 79 different managerial appointments. Nine managers of Lechia Gdańsk have spent more than one spell at the club, the highest being Michał Globisz who held the position of manager four times, albeit two of those times being as caretaker-manager. 17 of the 61 managers previously spent time at Lechia during their playing careers. Aside from Polish, eight other nationalities have been represented by foreign managers, with no foreign manager having managed to win more than 10 games as manager. In two of the managerial appointments, the clubs official sources claim there have been two people working together as the manager of the team. Both of these instances occurred during the Lechia-Polonia Gdańsk spell between 1998 and 2002. The first such instance was when Lechia-Polonia was first merged with Witold Kulik and Stanisław Stachura managing together for 29 games. The other instance happened after the sacking of Jerzy Jastrzębowski when Wiesław Wika and Lech Kulwicki jointly became the caretaker-managers. It should be noted however that in these instances it is most likely that Witold Kulik and Wiesław Wika were the official managers of the team, with Stanisław Stachura and Lech Kulwicki being the assistant managers during their appointments during this time. Wika was in charge of one game, winning the game, and are therefor technically the only managers in the clubs history to have a perfect record. The turnover rate of managers throughout the clubs history has been high with only four managers, Jerzy Jastrzębowski, Stanisław Stachura, Bogusław Kaczmarek and Piotr Stokowiec having made it to 100 games as manager for the club.

=== Dates ===
Some of the managers full dates of when they started/finished the job are known, where as with others its only the year that is known. The dates have been added to try and give the most accurate representation of when the manager held their role at the club.

If a manager is known to have left at the end of the season but the full date is not known, the date listed is that of the final official date of the season (for example this date is usually on 30 June if the season runs July–June), the same is for if a manager is known to have started at the beginning of the following season, the date listed will be the first official date of the season (this is usually 1 July if the season runs July–June). Some managers are known to have started their role after the winter break, if the official date is not known these will be listed as 1 February as often friendlies/official games were not played in January.

=== List ===
- (Poland) Zygmunt Czyżewski (7 August 1945 – 30 June 1946)
- (Poland) Ryszard Koncewicz (1 February 1949 – 4 July 1949)
- (Czech Republic) Václav Křížek (5 July 1949 – 31 December 1949)
- (Poland) Czesław Bartolik (1 February 1950 – 19 April 1953)
- (Austria) Ferdinand Fritsch (20 April 1953 – 31 December 1953)
- (Poland) Tadeusz Foryś (1 February 1954 – 31 December 1957)
- (Poland) Leszek Goździk (1 February 1958 – 31 December 1958)
- (Poland) Henryk Serafin (1 February 1959 – 7 August 1960)
- (Poland) Piotr Nierychło (8 August 1960 – 16 March 1961)
- (Hungary) Lajos Szolár (17 March 1961 – 31 December 1961)
- (Poland) Edward Drabiński (1 January 1962 – 19 August 1962)
- (Poland) Grzegorz Polakow (20 August 1962 – 23 September 1962)
- (Poland) Roman Rogocz (24 September 1962 – 30 June 1963)
- (Poland) Władysław Lemiszko (1 July 1963 – 22 November 1964)
- (Poland) Jerzy Wrzos (1 February 1965 – 30 June 1966)
- (Poland) Robert Gronowski (1 July 1966 – 27 November 1966)
- (Poland) Edward Brzozowski (1 February 1967 – 10 September 1967)
- (Poland) Bogumił Gozdur (11 September 1967 – 30 June 1970)
- (Poland) Jerzy Słaboszowski (1 July 1970 – 30 June 1971)
- (Poland) Roman Rogocz (1 July 1971 – 30 June 1972)
- (Poland) Ryszard Kulesza (1 July 1972 – 30 June 1974)
- (Poland) Wojciech Łazarek (1 July 1974 – 30 November 1975)
- (Poland) Grzegorz Polakow (1 February 1976 – 30 June 1976)
- (Poland) Marian Geszke (1 July 1976 – 28 November 1976)
- (Poland) Józef Walczak (29 November 1976 – 30 June 1978)
- (Poland) Janusz Pekowski (1 July 1978 – 30 June 1979)
- (Poland) Wojciech Przybylski (1 July 1979 – 30 November 1980)
- (Poland) Jerzy Brzyski (1 February 1981 – 30 June 1981)
- (Poland) Michał Globisz (1 June 1981 – 20 March 1982)
- (Poland) Edward Wojewódzki (21 March 1982 – 30 June 1982)
- (Poland) Jerzy Jastrzębowski (1 July 1982 – 23 September 1984)
- (Poland) Michał Globisz (24 September 1984 – 24 November 1984)
- (Poland) Wojciech Łazarek (25 November 1984 – 24 November 1985)
- (Poland) Michał Globisz (1 February 1986 – 30 June 1986)
- (Poland) Marian Geszke (1 July 1986 – 30 June 1987)
- (Poland) Zbigniew Kociołek (1 June 1987 – 2 April 1988)
- (Poland) Stanisław Stachura (3 April 1988 – 14 May 1989)
- (Poland) Bogusław Kaczmarek (15 May 1989 – 6 June 1992)
- (Poland) Adam Musiał (7 June 1992 – 30 June 1993)
- (Poland) Zbigniew Tymiński (1 July 1993 – 25 September 1993)
- (Poland) Marian Geszke (26 September 1993 – 19 November 1994)
- (Poland) Janusz Kupcewicz (1 February 1995 – 30 June 1995)
- (Poland) Hubert Kostka (1 July 1995 – 27 April 1996) (OPG)
- (Poland) Stanisław Stachura (28 April 1996 – 30 June 1996) (OPG)
- (Poland) Stanisław Stachura (1 July 1996 – 16 November 1996)
- (Poland) Józef Gładysz (17 November 1996 – 30 June 1997)
- (Poland) Andrzej Bikiewicz (1 July 1997 – 30 June 1998)
- (Poland) Witold Kulik(1 July 1998 – 30 June 1999) (LPG)
- (Poland) Jerzy Jastrzębowski (1 July 1999 – 4 March 2000) (LPG)
- (Poland) Wiesław Wika & Lech Kulwicki (5 March 2000 – 11 March 2020) (LPG)
- (Poland) Romuald Szukiełowicz (12 March 2000 – 4 October 2000) (LPG)
- (Poland) Stanisław Stachura (5 October 2000 – 30 June 2002) (LPG)
- (Poland) Michał Globisz (1 July 2001 – 25 August 2001)
- (Poland) Tadeusz Małolepszy (26 August 2001 – 16 November 2002)
- (Poland) Jerzy Jastrzębowski (1 February 2003 – 22 May 2004)
- (Poland) Marcin Kaczmarek (22 May 2004 – 16 June 2006)
- (Poland) Tomasz Borkowski (17 June 2006 – 27 August 2007)
- (Poland) Tomasz Kafarski (28 August 2007 – 29 August 2007)
- (Poland) Dariusz Kubicki (30 August 2007 – 22 July 2008)
- (Poland) Jacek Zieliński (23 July 2008 – 5 April 2009)
- (Poland) Tomasz Kafarski (7 April 2009 – 8 November 2011)
- (Poland) Rafał Ulatowski (9 November 2011 – 14 December 2011)
- (Poland) Paweł Janas (17 December 2011 – 24 May 2012)
- (Poland) Bogusław Kaczmarek (6 June 2012 – 4 June 2013)
- (Poland) Michał Probierz (4 June 2013 – 26 March 2014)
- (Netherlands) Ricardo Moniz (27 March 2014 – 4 June 2014)
- (Portugal) Quim Machado (16 June 2014 – 21 September 2014)
- (Poland) Tomasz Unton (21 September 2014 – 17 November 2014)
- (Poland) Jerzy Brzęczek (17 November 2014 – 1 September 2015)
- (Germany) Thomas von Heesen (1 September 2015 – 3 December 2015)
- (Poland) Dawid Banaczek (3 December 2015 – 13 January 2016)
- (Poland) Piotr Nowak (13 January 2016 – 27 September 2017)
- (Wales) Adam Owen (27 September 2017 – 3 March 2018)
- (Poland) Piotr Stokowiec (5 March 2018 – 28 August 2021 )
- (Poland) Tomasz Kaczmarek (1 September 2021 – 1 September 2022)
- (Poland) Maciej Kalkowski (1 September 2022 – 19 September 2022)
- (Poland) Marcin Kaczmarek (19 September 2022 – 21 March 2023)
- (Spain) David Badía (21 March 2023 – 14 June 2023)
- (Poland) Szymon Grabowski (14 June 2023 – 23 November 2024)
- (England) Kevin Blackwell & (Poland) Radosław Bella (27 November 2024 – 30 November 2024)
- (England) John Carver (30 November 2024 – 23 May 2026)
- (Ukraine) Vladyslav Lupashko (1 July 2026 – present)

== Statistics & records ==
=== Records ===
(Correct as of 1 September 2022)

- Most games as manager: Jerzy Jastrzębowski – (156 games)
- Most wins as manager: Jerzy Jastrzębowski – 103
- Most draws as manager: Bogusław Kaczmarek – 44
- Most defeats as manager: Stanisław Stachura – 66
- Most Ekstraklasa games as manager: Piotr Stokowiec – 121
- Highest win percentage in managers Lechia career (minimum 10 games): Tadeusz Małolepszy – 78.9% (30 wins in 38 games)
- Lowest win percentage in managers Lechia career (minimum 10 games): Edward Wojewódzki – 7.7% (1 wins in 13 games)
- Managers who have managed at least 100 games for Lechia: Jerzy Jastrzębowski (156), Bogusław Kaczmarek (148), Piotr Stokowiec (139), Stanisław Stachura (127)
- Longest single managerial tenure by time: Tadeusz Foryś 3 years 10 months (1,399 days)
- Longest single managerial tenure by games: Piotr Stokowiec (139 games)

=== Managerial statistics ===
This is a list of Lechia Gdańsk managers and their statistics in competitive competitions. The list includes caretaker managers, those managers given the contract on a caretaker/interim basis are shown in italics.

Name	Nat	From	To	G	W	D	L	%W
Lechia Gdańsk
Zygmunt Czyżewski (1910–1998)	(Poland)	7 August 1945	30 June 1946	20	13	2	5	65%
Ryszard Koncewicz (1911–2001)	(Poland)	1 February 1949	4 July 1949	10	3	1	6	30%
Václav Křížek (1902–19??)	(Czech Republic)	5 July 1949	31 December 1949	12	1	2	9	8.3%
Czesław Bartolik (1918–2008)	(Poland)	1 February 1950	19 April 1953	67	31	13	23	46.2%
Ferdinand Fritsch (1898–1966/67)	(Austria)	20 April 1953	31 December 1953	18	2	5	11	11.1%
Tadeusz Foryś (1910–1987)	(Poland)	1 February 1954	31 December 1957	93	43	24	26	46.2%
Leszek Goździk (1922–1983)	(Poland)	1 February 1958	31 December 1958	22	3	8	11	13.6%
Henryk Serafin (1920–1997)	(Poland)	1 February 1959	7 August 1960	39	12	9	18	30.7%
Piotr Nierychło (1921–1976)	(Poland)	8 August 1960	16 March 1961	7	3	1	3	42.8%
Lajos Szolár (1919–2005)	(Hungary)	17 March 1961	31 December 1961	26	9	6	11	34.6%
Edward Drabiński (1912–1995)	(Poland)	1 January 1962	19 August 1962	20	7	3	8	35%
Grzegorz Polakow (1935–)	(Poland)	20 August 1962	23 September 1962	5	1	0	4	20%
Roman Rogocz (1926–2013)	(Poland)	24 September 1962	30 June 1963	19	3	3	13	15.7%
Władysław Lemiszko (1911–1988)	(Poland)	1 July 1963	22 November 1964	47	17	10	20	36.1%
Jerzy Wrzos (1936–)	(Poland)	1 February 1965	30 June 1966	47	17	15	15	36.1%
Robert Gronowski (1926–1994)	(Poland)	1 July 1966	27 November 1966	17	4	5	8	23.5%
Edward Brzozowski (1920–1983)	(Poland)	1 February 1967	10 September 1967	21	8	6	7	38%
Bogumił Gozdur (1935–2017)	(Poland)	11 September 1967	30 June 1970	87	44	21	22	50.5%
Jerzy Słaboszowski (1932–1981)	(Poland)	1 July 1970	30 June 1971	34	24	6	4	70.5%
Roman Rogocz (1926–2013)	(Poland)	1 July 1971	30 June 1973	31	22	4	5	70.9%
Ryszard Kulesza (1931–2008)	(Poland)	1 July 1972	30 June 1974	63	21	23	19	33.3%
Wojciech Łazarek (1937–2023)	(Poland)	1 July 1974	30 November 1975	53	30	14	9	56.6%
Grzegorz Polakow (1935–)	(Poland)	1 February 1976	30 June 1976	15	8	5	2	53.3%
Marian Geszke (1943–)	(Poland)	1 July 1976	28 November 1976	16	5	9	2	31.2%
Józef Walczak (1931–2016)	(Poland)	29 November 1976	30 June 1978	46	27	13	6	58.6%
Janusz Pekowski (1945–)	(Poland)	1 July 1978	30 June 1979	35	20	9	6	57.1%
Wojciech Przybylski (1939–2021)	(Poland)	1 July 1979	30 November 1980	49	19	17	13	38.7%
Jerzy Brzyski (1949–)	(Poland)	1 February 1981	30 June 1981	16	3	6	7	18.7%
Michał Globisz (1946–)	(Poland)	1 June 1981	20 March 1982	18	5	4	9	27.7%
Edward Wojewódzki (1937–)	(Poland)	21 March 1982	30 June 1982	13	1	4	8	7.7%
Jerzy Jastrzębowski (1951–)	(Poland)	1 July 1982	23 September 1984	76	49	16	11	64.4%
Michał Globisz (1946–)	(Poland)	24 September 1984	24 November 1984	7	2	3	2	28.5%
Wojciech Łazarek (1937–2023)	(Poland)	25 November 1984	24 November 1985	40	10	11	19	25%
Michał Globisz (1946–)	(Poland)	1 February 1986	30 June 1986	12	4	4	4	33.3%
Marian Geszke (1943–)	(Poland)	1 July 1986	30 June 1987	33	9	9	15	27.2%
Zbigniew Kociołek (1945–2024)	(Poland)	1 July 1987	2 April 1988	21	4	10	7	19%
Stanisław Stachura (1941–)	(Poland)	3 April 1988	14 May 1989	39	12	8	19	30.7%
Bogusław Kaczmarek (1950–)	(Poland)	15 May 1989	6 June 1992	116	37	36	43	31.8%
Adam Musiał (1948–2020)	(Poland)	7 June 1992	30 June 1993	39	16	11	12	41%
Zbigniew Tymiński (1955–)	(Poland)	1 July 1993	25 September 1993	12	2	2	8	16.6%
Marian Geszke (1943–)	(Poland)	26 September 1993	19 November 1994	42	13	13	16	30.9%
Janusz Kupcewicz (1955–2022)	(Poland)	1 February 1995	30 June 1995	17	4	4	9	23.5%
Olimpia-Lechia Gdańsk
Hubert Kostka (1940–)	(Poland)	1 July 1995	27 April 1996	26	8	3	15	30.7%
Stanisław Stachura (1941–)	(Poland)	28 April 1996	30 June 1996	9	3	4	2	33.3%
Lechia Gdańsk
Stanisław Stachura (1941–)	(Poland)	1 July 1996	16 November 1996	14	4	1	9	28.5%
Józef Gładysz (1952–)	(Poland)	17 November 1996	30 June 1997	21	5	6	10	28.8%
Andrzej Bikiewicz (1955–)	(Poland)	1 July 1997	30 June 1998	35	22	7	6	62.8%
Lechia-Polonia Gdańsk
Witold Kulik (1957–)	(Poland)	1 July 1998	30 June 1999	29	13	4	12	44.8%
Jerzy Jastrzębowski (1951–)	(Poland)	1 July 1999	4 March 2000	27	9	7	11	33.3%
Wiesław Wika (1947–) & Lech Kulwicki (1951–)	(Poland)	5 March 2000	11 March 2000	1	1	0	0	100%
Romuald Szukiełowicz (1943–)	(Poland)	12 March 2000	4 October 2000	34	12	9	13	35.2%
Stanisław Stachura (1941–)	(Poland)	5 October 2000	30 June 2002	65	16	13	36	24.6%
Lechia Gdańsk
Michał Globisz (1946–)	(Poland)	1 July 2001	25 August 2001	2	2	0	0	100%
Tadeusz Małolepszy (1952–)	(Poland)	26 August 2001	16 November 2002	38	30	4	4	78.9%
Jerzy Jastrzębowski (1951–)	(Poland)	1 February 2003	21 May 2004	53	45	3	5	84.9%
Marcin Kaczmarek (1974–)	(Poland)	22 May 2004	16 June 2006	74	38	17	19	51.3%
Tomasz Borkowski (1972–)	(Poland)	17 June 2006	27 August 2007	41	16	12	13	39%
Dariusz Kubicki (1963–)	(Poland)	30 August 2007	22 July 2008	32	22	4	6	68.7%
Jacek Zieliński (1967–)	(Poland)	23 July 2008	5 April 2009	37	9	7	21	24.3%
Tomasz Kafarski (1975–)	(Poland)	7 April 2009	8 November 2011	94	32	27	35	34%
Rafał Ulatowski (1973–)	(Poland)	9 November 2011	14 December 2011	4	1	—	3	25%
Paweł Janas (1953–)	(Poland)	17 December 2011	24 May 2012	13	3	5	5	23%
Bogusław Kaczmarek (1950–)	(Poland)	6 June 2012	4 June 2013	32	11	8	13	34.3%
Michał Probierz (1972–)	(Poland)	4 June 2013	26 March 2014	42	12	15	15	28.5%
Ricardo Moniz (1964–)	(Netherlands)	27 March 2014	4 June 2014	10	5	3	2	50%
Quim Machado (1966–)	(Portugal)	16 June 2014	21 September 2014	9	3	3	3	33.3%
Tomasz Unton (1970–)	(Poland)	21 September 2014	17 November 2014	7	1	2	4	14.2%
Jerzy Brzęczek (1971–)	(Poland)	17 November 2014	1 September 2015	30	11	9	10	36.6%
Thomas von Heesen (1961–)	(Germany)	1 September 2015	3 December 2015	12	3	2	7	25%
Dawid Banaczek (1979–)	(Poland)	3 December 2015	13 January 2016	3	2	—	1	66.6%
Piotr Nowak (1964–)	(Poland)	13 January 2016	27 September 2017	66	31	16	19	46.9%
Adam Owen (1980–)	(Wales)	27 September 2017	3 March 2018	16	4	6	6	25%
Piotr Stokowiec (1972–)	(Poland)	5 March 2018	28 August 2021	139	64	35	40	46.6%
Tomasz Kaczmarek (1984–)	(Poland)	1 September 2021	1 September 2022	40	18	7	15	45%
Maciej Kalkowski (1974–)	(Poland)	1 September 2022	19 September 2022	3	0	2	1	0%
Marcin Kaczmarek (1974–)	(Poland)	19 September 2022	21 March 2023	18	7	2	9	38.8%
David Badía (1974–)	(Spain)	21 March 2023	14 June 2023	9	1	2	6	11.1%
Szymon Grabowski (1981–)	(Poland)	14 June 2023	27 November 2024	52	23	10	19	44.2%
Kevin Blackwell (1958–) & Radosław Bella (1987–)	(England) / (Poland)	27 November 2024	30 November 2024	1	0	0	1	0%
John Carver (1965–)	(England)	30 November 2024	23 May 2026	54	22	9	23	40.7%
Vladyslav Lupashko (1986–)	(Ukraine)	1 July 2026	present	0	0	0	0	—

Stats correct as of 1 July 2026.

== Honours ==
This is a list of honours of Lechia Gdańsk and the manager who was in charge of Lechia when they achieved that honour.

Ekstraklasa

- Third place: 1956 (Tadeusz Foryś), 2018–19 (Piotr Stokowiec)

Polish Cup

- Winners: 1983 (Jerzy Jastrzębowski), 2019 (Piotr Stokowiec)
- Runners-up: 1955 (Tadeusz Foryś), 2020 (Piotr Stokowiec)

Polish Super Cup:

- Winners: 1983 (Jerzy Jastrzębowski), 2019 (Piotr Stokowiec)

I liga

- Winners: 1951 (Czesław Bartolik), 1983–84 (Jerzy Jastrzębowski), 2007–08 (Dariusz Kubicki), 2023–24 (Szymon Grabowski)
- Runners-up: 1954 (Tadeusz Foryś), 1974–75 (Wojciech Łazarek), 1975–76 (Grzegorz Polakow), 1977–78 (Józef Walczak)
- Third place: 1978–79 (Janusz Pekowski)

II liga

- Winners: 1971–72 (Roman Rogocz), 1982–83 (Jerzy Jastrzębowski), 2004–05 (Marcin Kaczmarek)
- Runners-up: 1967–68 (Bogumił Gozdur), 1970–71 (Jerzy Słaboszowski)
- Third place: 1969–70 (Bogumił Gozdur), 1997–98 (Andrzej Bikiewicz)

European Competitions

- European Cup Winners Cup:
  - First round: 1983–84 (Jerzy Jastrzębowski)
- Europa League
  - Second qualifying round: 2019–20 (Piotr Stokowiec)
- Europa Conference League
  - Second qualifying round: 2022–23 (Tomasz Kaczmarek)

=== Condensed ===
Competition won	Manager & year
Polish Cup	Jerzy Jastrzębowski (1983); Piotr Stokowiec (2019)
Polish Super Cup	Jerzy Jastrzębowski (1983); Piotr Stokowiec (2019)

=== Top three Ekstraklasa finishes ===
Position	Manager	Year
3rd	Tadeusz Foryś	1956
3rd	Piotr Stokowiec	2018–19

== International managers ==
The managers below have managed Lechia as well as managing an international team at some point during their career. The dates in brackets are the managers time with Lechia.

Poland

- (Poland) 1952, 1963–1964, Tadeusz Foryś (1954–1957)
- (Poland) 1968–1970, Ryszard Koncewicz (1949)
- (Poland) 1978–1980, Ryszard Kulesza (1972–1974)
- (Poland) 1986–1989, Wojciech Łazarek (1974–1975, 1984–1986)
- (Poland) 2003–2006, Paweł Janas (2011–2012)
- (Poland) 2018–2020, Jerzy Brzęczek (2014–2015)
- (Poland) 2023–2025, Michał Probierz (2013–2014)

Antigua and Barbuda

- (Antigua and Barbuda) 2014–2015, Piotr Nowak (2016–2017)

Sudan

- (Sudan) 2002–2004, Wojciech Łazarek (1974–1975, 1984–1986)

Tunisia

- (Tunisia) 1981–1983, Ryszard Kulesza (1972–1974)
