= Olimpia Elbląg =

Polish professional football (soccer) team based in Elbląg, Poland

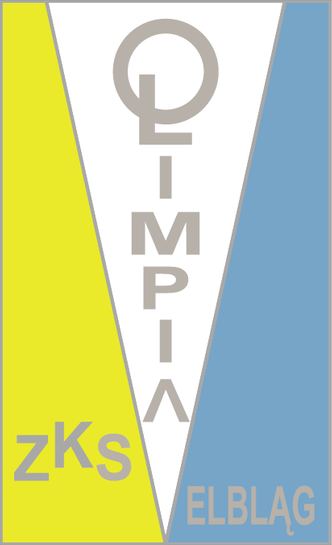
- Full name: Związkowy Klub Sportowy Olimpia Elbląg
- Nicknames: Żółto-biało-niebiescy (The Yellow, White And Blues); Związkowi (The trade unionists); Olimpijczycy (The Olympians)
- Founded: May 1945; 81 years ago
- Ground: Stadion Miejski
- Capacity: 7,000
- Chairman: Tomasz Orzechowski
- Manager: Karol Przybyła & Rafał Starzyński
- League: III liga, group I
- 2025–26: III liga, group I, 13th of 18
- Website: https://www.zksolimpia.pl
Home colours	Away colours

Olimpia Elbląg is a Polish professional football team based in Elbląg, competing in group I of the III liga. It was founded in 1945.

== Facilities ==
=== Olimpia Stadium ===
Olimpia has played near 8 Agrykola Street since 1945. There are projects for a new stadium for the team, but there is no decision when the investment will take place.

=== Training Camp Skrzydlata ===
Since the 1980s, Olimpia have had the current training camp which consists of a small number of football pitches (one with an organic lawn). The club is constantly being modernized, which includes the 2010 renovation.

== Club history ==
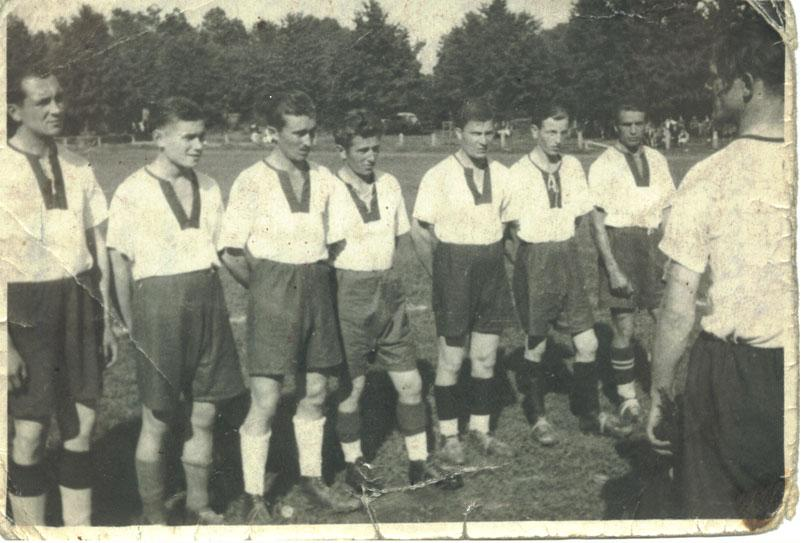
1946: Olimpia (Olympia) Elbląg on field Agrykola 8

=== Naming history ===
- 1945: MKS Syrena Elbląg
- 1946–May 1946: Klub Sportowy Stocznia Elbląg
- May 1946 – 1949: Klub Sportowy Olimpia Elbląg
- 1949–1951: Ogniwo Elbląg
- 1951–1955: Budowlani Elbląg
- 1955–1956: Olimpia Elbląg
- 1960–1992: Olimpia Elbląg
- 1992–2002: KS Polonia Elbląg
- 2002–2004: KS Polonia Olimpia Elbląg
- 15 October 2004–?: Piłkarski KS Olimpia Elbląg
- ?–28 June 2013: Klub Sportowy Olimpia Elbląg
- 28 June 2013–present: Związkowy Klub Sportowy Olimpia Elbląg

=== Club crest ===
The club crest has been changed many times throughout the club's history. Mostly the club uses the current team motif.

Changes of Olimpia Elbląg crest 1946–2010
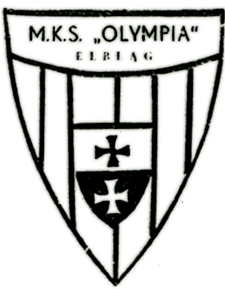

== Honours ==
- Nine seasons in the I liga, with the highest finishing position of 8th (1986–87)
- Polish Cup round of 16: 1976–77
- Polish Youth Championship runners-up: 1989

== Current squad ==
As of 12 September 2025

Note: Flags indicate national team as defined under FIFA eligibility rules; some limited exceptions apply. Players may hold more than one non-FIFA nationality.

No.	Pos.	Nation	Player
1	GK	POL	Maksymilian Manikowski
2	DF	POL	Bartosz Winkler
4	DF	POL	Kacper Łaszak
6	MF	POL	Jakub Pek
7	MF	POL	Kacper Kondracki
8	MF	POL	Marcin Czernis
9	FW	POL	Dominik Kozera
10	MF	POL	Eryk Jarzębski
11	MF	POL	Oskar Kordykiewicz
12	MF	POL	Dawid Czapliński
13	MF	POL	Maciej Tobojka

No.	Pos.	Nation	Player
14	DF	UKR	Orest Tiahlo
16	MF	POL	Mateusz Młynarczyk
17	MF	POL	Fryderyk Misztal
18	MF	POL	Marcel Michoń
19	FW	POL	Wiktor Triki
20	MF	UKR	Dmytro Semeniv
22	GK	POL	Tymon Wojciechowski
23	MF	POL	Dominik Pawłowski
26	DF	POL	Maciej Kołoczek
28	MF	POL	Dawid Laszczyk
30	DF	POL	Dawid Wierzba (captain)

== Youth teams ==
Some of the most famous players whose careers started in the Olimpia youth teams are: Adam Fedoruk (former Poland international, UEFA Champions League participant with Legia Warsaw), Bartosz Białkowski (Millwall goalkeeper) and Maciej Bykowski (former Panathinaikos forward).

== Managers ==
Coaches & managers since 1960, when Olimpia was created from Elbląg's other football clubs

- (Poland) Aleksander Grudziński (1959–61)
- (Poland) Mieczysław Lorenc (1962)
- (Poland) Witold Kamieński (1962–63)
- (Poland) Edward Kołpa (1963–65)
- (Poland) Witold Kamieński (1966)
- (Poland) Stefan Wesołowski (1967–70)
- (Poland) Bogumił Gozdur (1970–72)
- (Poland) Jerzy Wrzos (1973)
- (Poland) Franciszek Rogowski (1974)
- (Poland) Andrzej Cehelik (23 July 1974–75)
- (Poland) Zdzisław Rogowski (1975)
- (Poland) Wojciech Łazarek (January 1976–77)
- (Poland) Eugeniusz Różański (1977–78)
- (Poland) Jan Kowalski (1978–79)
- (Poland) Eugeniusz Samolczyk (1979–80)
- (Poland) Jerzy Słaboszewski (1980)
- (Poland) Józef Bujko (1980–81)
- (Poland) Stanisław Stachura (1981–83)
- (Poland) Marian Geszke (1984)
- (Poland) Józef Bujko (1984–87)
- (Poland) Lech Strembski (1987)
- (Poland) Eugeniusz Różański (1988)
- (Poland) Józef Bujko (1989–90)
- (Poland) Stanisław Fijarczyk (1990–94)
- (Poland) Lech Strembski (1994–96)
- (Poland) Sebastian Klimek (1996)
- (Poland) Bogusław Kołodziejski (1997–00)
- (Poland) Stanisław Fijarczyk (2000–02)
- (Poland) Adam Fedoruk (2002 – 26 September 2003)
- (Poland) Andrzej Bianga (2003 – 24 November 2006)
- (Poland) Zbigniew Kieżun (24 November 2006 – 16 August 2007)
- (Poland) Tomasz Wichniarek (16 August 2007 – 9 July 2009)
- (Poland) Tomasz Arteniuk (9 July 2009 – 4 April 2011)
- (Poland) Jarosław Araszkiewicz (5 April 2011 – 12 June 2011)
- (Poland) Grzegorz Wesołowski (22 June 2011 – 15 October 2011)
- (Ukraine) Anatoliy Piskovets (18 October 2011 – 9 January 2012)
- (Belarus) Oleg Radushko (16 January 2012 – 7 November 2013)
- (Poland) Dariusz Kaczmarczyk (caretaker) (7 November 2013 – 2 December 2013)
- (Poland) Adam Boros (2 December 2013 – 24 September 2018)
- (Poland) Dariusz Kaczmarczyk & Tomasz Wiercioch (caretakers) (24 September 2018 – 27 September 2018)
- (Poland) Adam Nocoń (27 September 2018 – 16 June 2020)
- (Poland) Dariusz Kaczmarczyk (caretaker) (16 June 2020 – 2 July 2020)
- (Poland) Łukasz Kowalski (2 July 2020 – 5 October 2020)
- (Poland) Dariusz Kaczmarczyk (caretaker) (5 October 2020 – 2 November 2020)
- (Poland) Jacek Trzeciak (2 November 2020 – 15 June 2021)
- (Poland) Tomasz Grzegorczyk (25 June 2021 – 3 June 2022)
- (Poland) Przemysław Gomułka (6 June 2022 – 6 April 2024)
- (Poland) Sebastian Letniowski (10 April 2024 – 28 August 2024)
- (Poland) Karol Przybyła (28 August 2024 – 12 December 2024)
- (Poland) Karol Szweda (12 December 2024 – 27 May 2025)
- (Poland) Damian Hebda (caretaker) (27 May 2025 – 30 June 2025)
- (Poland) Damian Jarzembowski (1 July 2025 – 8 October 2025)
- (Poland) Damian Hebda (8 October 2025 – 27 April 2026)
- (Poland) Karol Przybyła & (Poland) Rafał Starzyński (27 April 2026 – present)

== Fans ==
The team supporters live mostly in Elbląg. The largest attendance at the Olimpia's stadium were recorded during the Polish Second League games in the 1970s and 1980s: 10,000 attendants during the 1/16 final of the Polish Cup in autumn 1976 or circa 12,000 when Olimpia was playing in Second League in the mid-1970s.

Fans from Elbląg have their own association called 776 p.n.e. (the date symbolising the first Ancient Olympic Games) and an ultras group called SMG'06.

In 2004, the Olimpia fans have created their own team ZKS Olimpia Elbląg (historical club name). They have protested against club policy. After two seasons, the team reached the 5th level in the Polish football, but after several years, the two sides came to an agreement and merged the two clubs.

Elbląg has another football team called Concordia, but only Olimpia has an organised fanbase. The Olimpia fans have friendly relationships with supporters of Legia Warsaw and Zagłębie Sosnowiec.

Their main rivals are local clubs Stomil Olsztyn, Jeziorak Iława and to a lesser extent Arka Gdynia.
