= Papaleo =

Papaleo is a surname. Notable people with the surname include:

- Carolina Papaleo (born 1969), Argentine actress
- Joaquín Papaleo (born 1994), Argentine footballer
- Joe Papaleo (born 1961), American soccer goalkeeper
- Joseph Papaleo (1925–2004), Italian American novelist and academic
- Lawrence Papaleo (born 1989), American soccer coach and former player
- Raúl Papaleo (born 1971), Puerto Rican beach volleyball player
- Rocco Papaleo (born 1958), Italian actor, film director and singer
