= Brzyski =

Brzyski (feminine: Brzyska, plural: Brzyscy) is a surname of Polish language origin. It may refer to:

== People ==
- Agnieszka Szulc-Brzyska (born 1967), Polish instrumentalist professor
- Alan Tomasz Brzyski (born 1977), Polish priest and Franciscan friar, philosopher, and theologian
- Bogdan Brzyski (born 1973), Polish actor
- Jerzy Brzyski (born 1949), Polish doctor of physical sciences, football coach, and former football manager
- Tomasz Brzyski (born 1982), Polish footballer who plays as a left back or midfielder
- Wanda Brzyska (1931–2020), Polish chemistry professor

== Places ==
- Brzyska, a village in Jasło County, Subcarpathian Voivodeship, in south-eastern Poland
- Brzyska Wola, a village in the administrative district of Gmina Kuryłówka, within Leżajsk County, Subcarpathian Voivodeship, in south-eastern Poland
- Gmina Brzyska, a rural gmina (administrative district) in Jasło County, Subcarpathian Voivodeship, in south-eastern Poland
