= Tadeusz Foryś =

Polish football manager (1910–1987)

Personal information
- Full name: Tadeusz Antoni Foryś
- Date of birth: 31 October 1910
- Place of birth: Kraków, Austria-Hungary
- Date of death: 6 March 1987 (aged 76)
- Place of death: Warsaw, Poland

Senior career*
Years	Team	Apps	(Gls)
- Warszawianka

Managerial career
- 1938: Poland (assistant)
- 1948: Polonia Warsaw (assistant)
- 1948: Poland (assistant)
- 1948–1949: Polonia Warsaw
- 1950–1951: Kolejarz-Polonia Warsaw
- 1950: Poland (assistant)
- 1951: Poland (assistant)
- 1951: Gwardia Warsaw
- 1952: Poland
- 1953: Poland (assistant)
- 1954–1957: Lechia Gdańsk
- 1956: Arka Gdynia
- 1956: Poland (assistant)
- 1958–1960: Gwardia Warsaw
- 1959: Poland (assistant)
- 1962: Poland (assistant)
- 1963–1964: Poland
- 1964–1965: ŁKS Łódź
- 1966–1967: Odra Opole
- 1968–1969: GKS Katowice
- 1969–1971: Ruch Chorzów
- 1996–1997: Bałtyk Gdynia
- 1971–1972: Odra Opole
- 1973–1975: GKS Katowice
- * Club domestic league appearances and goals

Tadeusz Foryś (31 October 1910 – 6 March 1987) was a Polish footballer and manager.

== Career ==
Foryś spent his playing career with Warszawianka.

After his playing career, he went into coaching and management. In total he was assistant manager of Poland eight times, and the Polish first team manager twice. In the league he managed Polonia Warsaw, Gwardia Warsaw, Lechia Gdańsk, Arka Gdynia, ŁKS Łódź, Odra Opole, GKS Katowice, Ruch Chorzów, and Bałtyk Gdynia.

In 1983 he became an honorary member of the PZPN (Polish Football association).

== Personal life ==
His father, Walenty Foryś, was the president of the Polish Athletic Association. His brother, Czesław Foryś, was an athlete who competed for Poland in the 1928 Summer Olympics as a 1500m runner. He was the vice president of the Polish Athletic Association from 1949–65, and became an honorary president for the association in 1965.
