= Józef Walczak =

Polish footballer and manager

Personal information
- Full name: Józef Stanisław Walczak
- Date of birth: 3 January 1931
- Place of birth: Łódź, Poland
- Date of death: 14 April 2016 (aged 85)
- Place of death: Łódź, Poland
- Height: 1.77 m (5 ft 10 in)
- Position: Midfielder

Senior career*
| Years | Team | Apps | (Gls) |
| 1952–1954 | ŁKS Łódź | | |
| 1955–1956 | Zawisza Bydgoszcz | | |
| 1957–1966 | ŁKS Łódź | | |

International career
| 1954–1956 | Poland | 2 | (0) |

Managerial career
- 1971–1972: ŁKS Łódź
- Włókniarz Łódź
- Włókniarz Pabianice
- Motor Lublin
- 1975–1976: Bałtyk Gdynia
- 1977–1978: Lechia Gdańsk
- 1981–1982: Stal Mielec
- 1983: Cracovia
- 1983–1984: Cracovia
- * Club domestic league appearances and goals

Józef Walczak (born 3 January 1931 – 14 April 2016) was a Polish football player and manager. He mainly played for ŁKS Łódź during his playing career, made two international appearances for Poland between 1954 and 1956, and went on to manage eight different teams.

== Football ==
Walczak started his playing career with his local club ŁKS Łódź, playing with ŁKS for two seasons, winning promotion in the first season before finishing second in the top division the season after. He moved to Zawisza Bydgoszcz for two seasons, finishing third with the team in his first season. He returned to ŁKS in 1957, spending the next nine years at the club. He played for ŁKS during their golden years, helping them to their first I liga title in 1958, and lifting the Polish Cup in 1957, the only time the team have won the competition. In total for ŁKS Łódź, Walczak made a total of 211 games scoring 11 goals.

After his playing career, Walczak went on to manage ŁKS Łódź, Włókniarz Łódź, Włókniarz Pabianice, Motor Lublin, Bałtyk Gdynia, Lechia Gdańsk, Stal Mielec and Cracovia. His management career saw him finishing second in the II liga with Lechia in 1978, while achieving a third-place finish in the top division with Stal Mielec in 1982.

== Honours ==
=== Player ===
ŁKS Łódź

- Ekstraklasa: 1958; runner-up: 1954
- II liga runner-up: 1953
- Polish Cup: 1956–57

Zawisza Bydgoszcz

- II liga third place: 1955

=== Manager ===
Lechia Gdańsk

- II liga runner-up: 1977–78

Stal Mielec

- Ekstraklasa third place: 1981–82
