= Marian Geszke =

Polish association football manager

Personal information
- Full name: Marian Geszke
- Date of birth: 3 September 1943 (age 83)
- Place of birth: Pinsk, Reichskommissariat Ukraine
- Position: Midfielder

Managerial career
- Years: Team
- 1970–1971: Bałtyk Gdynia
- 1973–1976: Stoczniowiec Gdańsk
- 1976: Lechia Gdańsk (assistant manager)
- 1976: Lechia Gdańsk
- 1977–1978: Lechia Gdańsk (assistant manager)
- 1980–1981: ŁKS Łódź
- 1984: Olimpia Elbląg
- 1986–1987: Lechia Gdańsk
- 1987–1988: Zawisza Bydgoszcz
- 1988–1989: Polonia Bytom
- 1990–1991: Bałtyk Gdynia
- 1991–1992: Stal Stalowa Wola
- 1993: Cracovia Chicago
- 1993–1994: Lechia Gdańsk
- 1995: Arka Gdynia
- 1995–2000: Cracovia Chicago
- 2000–2001: Bałtyk Gdynia
- 2004–2005: Wigry Suwałki
- 2013–2014: Cartusia Kartuzy
- 2016–2017: Cartusia Kartuzy

Marian Geszke (born 3 September 1943) is a retired Polish football manager.

== Early years ==
Geszke was born in Pinsk, which before World War II was part of Poland. In 1939, it became a part of the Soviet Union following the Soviet invasion of Poland, but, in 1941, it was taken by Nazi Germany. At the time of Geszke's birth, Pinsk had been under German occupation. After the war, the city was again taken by the Soviets. Geszke and his family were sent to the modern day Poland, initially being sent to Chełm before being redirected to Sopot which is where the family settled.

== Managerial career ==
In total Geszke managed all three big teams in the Tricity, Lechia Gdańsk, Bałtyk Gdynia and Arka Gdynia. His first managerial appointment was with Bałtyk Gdynia in 1970, before joining Stoczniowiec Gdańsk for 3 years, and then eventually ended up at Lechia Gdańsk in 1976. Geszke had various short spells at many different clubs, including ŁKS Łódź, Zawisza Bydgoszcz, as well as Lechia Gdańsk and Bałtyk Gdynia again for a second time. In 1995 he moved to the United States and joined up with a Polish club in Chicago, Cracovia Chicago. Despite not initially staying in the US for long, as he rejoined Lechia for a third time and then had a short spell with Arka Gdynia, he moved back to Chicago and spent the next 5 years there. In 2000 he came back to Poland to manage Bałtyk Gdynia for the third time, a position he held until 2001. In 2004 Geszke joined Wigry Suwałki before having his last two spells in management before his retirement, both with Cartusia Kartuzy.
