= Andrzej Bikiewicz =

Polish footballer and manager

Personal information
- Full name: Andrzej Bikiewicz
- Date of birth: 13 October 1955 (age 71)
- Place of birth: Rzgów, Poland
- Height: 1.82 m (6 ft 0 in)
- Position: Forward

Youth career
- Ogniwa Sopot

Senior career*
Years	Team	Apps	(Gls)
- MRKS Gdańsk
1975–1978	Bałtyk Gdynia	66	(18)
1978–1980	Arka Gdynia	34	(7)
1980	Bałtyk Gdynia	6	(1)
1981–1982	Lechia Gdańsk	7	(1)
Total		113	(27)

Managerial career
- 1986–1987: Arka Gdynia
- 1989–1990: Arka Gdynia
- 1997–1998: Lechia Gdańsk
- * Club domestic league appearances and goals

Andrzej Bikiewicz (born 13 October 1955) is a Polish former football player and manager. During his career, he exclusively played for and managed teams within the Tricity area.

== Football ==
Bikiewicz started his career with Ogniwa Sopot, before signing his first professional contract with MRKS Gdańsk. In 1975 he joined Bałtyk Gdynia, where he played a total of 70 games and scored 20 goals in his first spell with Bałtyk. In 1978 he joined Arka Gdynia, in what would be his most successful season of his playing career. Arka won the Polish Cup in 1979, beating Wisła Kraków 2–1 in the final. In total Bikiewicz played 68 games for Arka, scoring 20 goals in all competitions (with a minimum of 34 league games and 7 league goals). After Arka, he once again joined Bałtyk Gdynia, this time only managing 6 games and 1 goal for the club, before moving to Lechia Gdańsk for a season, where he played a total of 7 games scoring 1 goal.

After his playing career, Bikiewicz moved into management. Firstly he had two spells with Arka Gdynia, in 1986–87 and 1989–90. After Arka, his next managerial position was in 1997–98 with Lechia Gdańsk.

== Honours ==
Arka Gdynia

- Polish Cup: 1978–79
