= Marcin Kaczmarek (footballer, born 1974) =

Polish association football player

Personal information
- Full name: Marcin Kaczmarek
- Date of birth: 2 January 1974 (age 52)
- Place of birth: Sztum, Poland
- Height: 1.80 m (5 ft 11 in)
- Positions: Defender; midfielder

Youth career
- MRKS Gdańsk
- Lechia Gdańsk

Senior career*
Years	Team	Apps	(Gls)
1990–1994	Lechia Gdańsk	71	(19)
1994–1998	Pogoń Szczecin	94	(2)
1999–2001	GKS Bełchatów	54	(4)
2002	Unia Tczew	5	(0)
2003	Stomil Olsztyn	10	(0)
2003–2004	Lechia Gdańsk	22	(3)
Total		256	(28)

Managerial career
- 2004–2006: Lechia Gdańsk
- 2007: Pogoń Szczecin
- 2008–2012: Olimpia Grudziądz
- 2012–2017: Wisła Płock
- 2018–2019: Bruk-Bet Termalica
- 2019–2020: Widzew Łódź
- 2022–2023: Lechia Gdańsk
- * Club domestic league appearances and goals

Marcin Kaczmarek (born 2 January 1974) is a Polish professional football manager and former player, most recently in charge of Ekstraklasa club Lechia Gdańsk. He occasionally works as a pundit and commentator for Polsat Sport. During his career, Kaczmarek played in Ekstraklasa for Pogoń Szczecin and GKS Bełchatów, making a total of 97 appearances in Poland's top division.

== Senior career ==
Kaczmarek had been part of the Lechia Gdańsk academy, before being promoted to the first team at the beginning of the 1990 season. His Lechia debut came in a 1–0 win over Szombierki Bytom on 3 June 1990, in which he played 44 minutes. During his first two seasons with Lechia, Kaczmerek struggled to break into the first team, relying on few substitute appearances to get game time. Kaczmarek's first professional league start came in his third season when he started in a home game against Miedź Legnica. As he developed as a player, he also saw more game time with the club, making over 20 league appearances in each of his last two seasons. Despite becoming a more important player, Kaczmarek played with Lechia during a difficult period in their history in which they found themselves mostly uncompetitive and finishing towards the lower ends of the II liga. Despite Lechia's struggles, Kaczmarek made a total 77 appearances and scored 22 goals in all competitions during his first spell with the club, with his most successful season with Lechia being during the 1993–94 campaign, where he played 32 games and scored 9 goals.

His good form for Lechia earned Kaczmarek a move to Poland's top division when he joined I liga team Pogoń Szczecin in 1994 aged 21. He instantly found himself to be an important player with Pogoń, going on to make 26 appearances in his first I liga season, also scoring a goal against Widzew Łódź in a 1–0 win, the goal would turn out to be Kaczmareks only goal in Polands highest division. He made another 26 appearances the following season, however it was a season where the team as a whole struggled, winning only 2 of their 30 league games, and scoring only 9 points all season. After facing relegation with Pogoń to the II liga, they bounced back to the top flight at the first time of asking in 1997, finishing runners-up behind Dyskobolia Grodzisk. He made a further 33 appearances in the I liga with Pogoń over the next 18 months, before being transferred to fellow Ekstraklasa team GKS Bełchatów in January 1999. Kaczmarek made 11 appearances with Bełchatów that season, with the team struggling in the league, and Kaczmarek being relegated from the I liga for a second time. He continued to play with Bełchatów in the second division for a further two years before injuries started to affect his playing time and abilities and he was released midway through his fourth season with the club. In 2002 Kaczmarek dropped down into the lower leagues with Unia Tczew, spending 6 months with Unia, and making only 5 appearances with the club, due to his time in Tczew being plagued by injury, before joining Stomil Olsztyn for the next six months. After his time at Stomil, Kaczmarek returned to Lechia Gdańsk for a season working as both the assistant manager while also being a player. He went on to make 22 appearances and scoring 3 goals for the club as they won promotion from the fourth tier. In 2004, at the age of 30, and seeing a decline in performance and a drop down the leagues due to consistent injuries for the last 3 years of his playing career, Kaczmarek decided to retire from playing football and to focus on coaching in football.

== Managerial career ==
After the game on 22 May 2004, Jerzy Jastrzębowski left as the manager of Lechia. Kaczmarek retired from playing and instantly found first managerial position with Lechia Gdańsk, leading the club in the final six games of the season. Under his guidance, Lechia achieved promotion from the fourth tier to the second tier of Polish football.

After achieving safety for Lechia in I liga, Kaczmarek returned to another club he had previously played for, joining Pogoń Szczecin in 2007. After managing the team for the first half of the season, Kaczmarek was told he would not be manager for the second half.

After his short spell with Pogoń, Kaczmarek took charge of Olimpia Grudziądz in 2008. His 4 seasons with Olimpia were successful, and while under his command he saw Olimpia winning the III liga in 2009, and the II liga in 2011.

In 2012, he joined Wisła Płock, who had just been relegated from I liga. In his first season Wisła won the third tier, ensuring promotion back to I liga. After a further three more seasons with Wisła, Kaczmarek saw his side finish runners-up in I Liga, and promoted to Ekstraklasa. His first season in top division saw Wisła finish comfortably in 10th.

In 2018, Kaczmarek joined recently relegated Bruk-Bet Termalica Nieciecza in I liga, leading the club until the end of the season.

Ahead of the 2019–20 season, Kaczmarek was appointed manager of Widzew Łódź, leaving after his contract finished the following summer.

On 19 September 2022, Kaczmarek returned to Ekstraklasa and Lechia, agreeing to a two-year deal to manage his former club who at the time were placed bottom of the league table. On 21 March 2023, after leading Lechia to six wins and two draws in 16 league games, with the team placed 17th and three points away from safety, Kaczmarek was dismissed.

== Personal life ==
He is the son of former footballer and manager Bogusław Kaczmarek. His wife, Magdalena Skorupka-Kaczmarek, is a journalist.

== Managerial statistics ==
As of match played 19 March 2023

Managerial record by team and tenure
Team	From	To	Record							
Team	From	To	G	W	D	L	GF	GA	GD	Win %
Lechia Gdańsk	22 May 2004	16 June 2006	76	39	19	18	128	82	+46	51.32
Pogoń Szczecin	July 2007	29 November 2007	20	13	5	2	47	16	+31	65.00
Olimpia Grudziądz	1 July 2008	15 June 2012	146	81	34	31	264	140	+124	55.48
Wisła Płock	22 June 2012	5 July 2017	180	87	47	46	259	185	+74	48.33
Bruk-Bet Termalica	17 September 2018	30 June 2019	28	13	8	7	41	31	+10	46.43
Widzew Łódź	1 July 2019	27 July 2020	36	18	8	10	69	40	+29	50.00
Lechia Gdańsk	19 September 2022	21 March 2023	18	7	3	8	23	26	−3	38.89
Career total			504	258	124	122	831	520	+311	51.19

== Honours ==
=== Player ===
Pogoń Szczecin

- II liga West runner-up: 1996–97

Lechia Gdańsk

- IV liga Pomerania: 2003–04

=== Manager ===
Lechia Gdańsk

- III liga, group II: 2004–05
- IV liga Pomerania: 2003–04

Olimpia Grudziądz

- II liga West: 2010–11
- III liga Kuyavia-Pomerania – Greater Poland: 2008–09
- Polish Cup (Kuyavia-Pomerania regionals): 2008–09

Wisła Płock

- I liga runner-up: 2015–16
- II liga East: 2012–13
