= Edward Wojewódzki =

Polish association football manager

Personal information
- Full name: Edward Wojewódzki
- Date of birth: 17 November 1937 (age 88)
- Place of birth: Vileyka, Poland

Managerial career
- Years: Team
- 1982: Lechia Gdańsk

Edward Wojewódzki (born 17 November 1937) is a former football coach and manager. Wojewódzki only had one management job in football which was with Lechia Gdańsk in 1982. After a 4–0 defeat in the final months of the season Wojewódzki took over from Michał Globisz with the aim of keeping Lechia in the division. This did not happen, and Lechia were relegated to the third tier for the first time in ten years.
