= Henryk Serafin =

Polish footballer and manager

Personal information
- Full name: Henryk Serafin
- Date of birth: 11 July 1920
- Place of birth: Kraków, Poland
- Date of death: 9 December 1997 (aged 77)
- Place of death: Warsaw, Poland
- Height: 1.75 m (5 ft 9 in)
- Position: Defender

Youth career
- 1933–1938: Wisła Kraków

Senior career*
Years	Team	Apps	(Gls)
1938–1939	Wisła Kraków	13	(0)
1945–1951	Legia Warsaw	79	(0)
1952–1953	Polonia Warsaw		
Total		92	(0)

Managerial career
- 1959–1960: Lechia Gdańsk
- 1961: Arka Gdynia
- Bałtyk Gdynia
- * Club domestic league appearances and goals

Henryk Serafin (born 11 July 1920 – 9 December 1997) was a football player and manager.

== Football ==
Serafin started his footballing career in the youth teams of Wisła Kraków, first joining the club at the age of 13. He made his first team debut against ŁKS Łódź on 30 November 1938, before making a further 12 appearances the following season. In 1939, at the age of 20, the outbreak of World War II stopped Serafin's footballing career. After the war finished, Serafin started his career again with Legia Warsaw. Despite joining Legia in 1945, it wasn't until 1948 when he played his first game for the team, ending up playing 82 games in all competitions over the span of 4 seasons. After leaving Legia in 1951, Sarafin spent a season away from football before joining Legia's city rivals Polonia Warsaw for a season in 1952.

After his playing career, Serafin moved into management. During his time as a manager, he managed 3 teams in the Tricity area. Firstly with Lechia Gdańsk for 2 seasons from 1959–60, Arka Gdynia for a season in 1961, and finally with Bałtyk Gdynia.
