= Czesław Boguszewicz =

Polish footballer and manager

Personal information
- Date of birth: 2 July 1950 (age 76)
- Place of birth: Słupsk, Poland
- Height: 1.82 m (6 ft 0 in)
- Position: Defender

Senior career*
Years	Team	Apps	(Gls)
1966–1967	Gryf Słupsk		
1967–1968	Pogoń Szczecin II		
1968–1976	Pogoń Szczecin		
1976–1978	Arka Gdynia		
1981–1982	Mikkelin Palloilijat		
1983–1984	Reipas Lahti		

International career
1976-1977	Poland	5	(0)

Managerial career
- 1979–1980: Arka Gdynia
- 1982–1985: Reipas Lahti
- 1985: Joutsenon Kullervo
- 1989–1991: Kotkan Työväen Palloilijat
- Nigerdock FC
- * Club domestic league appearances and goals

Czesław Boguszewicz (born 2 July 1950) is a Polish former professional footballer and manager.

== Career ==
At the age of 16, Boguszewicz joined Pogoń Szczecin in the Polish top flight and debuted at the age of 17. Just before the 1978 FIFA World Cup, he suffered an eye injury, causing him to miss the squad and retire from professional football.

While playing, Boguszewicz obtained his coaching badges, causing him to be appointed head coach of Arka Gdynia at the age of 28, where he won the Polish Cup in 1979. After vacationing in Finland, Boguszewicz played and coached there, where the season lasted from spring to autumn and the attendances were low.

From Finland, he was appointed head coach of Nigerian side Nigerdock, where he experienced corruption and was stoned by opposing fans on one occasion.

== Honours ==
=== Manager ===
Arka Gdynia

- Polish Cup: 1978–79
