= Ferdinand Fritsch =

Polish association football manager

Personal information
- Full name: Ferdinand Fritsch
- Date of birth: 29 March 1898
- Place of birth: Hrabětice, Austria-Hungary
- Place of death: Vienna, Austria death date 1966/1967 aged 68

Managerial career
- Years: Team
- 1950: Arka Gdynia
- 1953: Lechia Gdańsk
- 1960–1962: Grazer AK

Ferdinand Fritsch (29 March 1898 - 1966/67) was an Austrian football manager.

== Football ==
Fritsch's first known job in football was with Arka Gdynia in 1950. Fritsch joined Arka's rivals Lechia Gdańsk in 1953, taking up the role while they were in the top flight of Polish football. His time at Lechia was unsuccessful with the team only winning 2 of his 18 games in charge. From leaving Lechia in 1953, Fritsch's next documented job was with Grazer AK in Austria in 1960 before leaving the role in 1962.

== Death ==
Little is known about Fritsch's death, only that he died aged 68 in Vienna, Austria. This places his year of death in either 1966 or 1967.
