= Michał Globisz =

Polish footballer and manager

Personal information
- Date of birth: 11 December 1946 (age 79)
- Place of birth: Poznań, Poland

Managerial career
- Years: Team
- 1974–1981: Lechia Gdańsk (youth)
- 1981–1982: Lechia Gdańsk
- 1982–1984: Poland U20
- 1984: Lechia Gdańsk
- 1985–1986: Lechia Gdańsk (assistant)
- 1986: Lechia Gdańsk
- 1996–2010: Poland (youth teams)
- 2001: Lechia Gdańsk
Medal record
Men's football
Representing Poland (as manager)
UEFA European Under-18 Championship
Winner	2001 Finland
UEFA European Under-16 Championship
Runner-up	1999 Czech Republic

Michał Globisz (born 11 December 1946) is a Polish former professional football manager and player.

From 1992 until 2010, he was part of the PZPN serving as manager for multiple youth national teams, winning the silver medal at the 1999 UEFA Euro Under-16 and the gold medal in the 2001 UEFA Euro Under-18.

== Early life ==
Globisz lived in Poznań until he was 10 years old. From 1964 to 1969, he studied at the University of Gdańsk in Sopot. In 1978, he obtained football license from the Akademia Wychowania Fizycznego Józefa Piłsudskiego in Warsaw. He has a class 1 coaching degree.

== Playing career ==
After moving to Wrocław, Globisz played for his first football club Śląsk Wrocław. He then moved again in 1961 to Gdańsk, where he played for the Lechia Gdańsk and Arka Gdynia youth teams. In college, he played for AZS WSE Sopot.

== Coaching career ==
In 1974, Globisz took on the role of a youth coach at Lechia Gdańsk. In 1981, Globisz managed to finish in 3rd place in the Polish Championship. In July of the same year, he received his first job as a head coach of Lechia's senior team. During the 1981–1982 season, Lechia played in the 2nd division. In March 1982, he moved back to his position as a youth coach. He again was the manager from September 1984 to December 1984, and managed Lechia in the top-flight of the 1984–1985 season. After his dismissal, he agreed to become the assistant manager to Wojciech Łazarek. His last season as a staff member of Lechia was in the fall of the 1985–1986 season.

He began his work as the coach of the Polish youth national teams in March 1996. In October 1998, his under-16 team qualified for the 1999 UEFA European Under-16 Championship. During the tournament held in the Czech Republic, Globisz led the team to the final, eliminating Russia, Croatia, Portugal and the hosts along the way. Poland finished the tournaments as runners-up after losing 4–1 to Spain in the final game. In November 1999, Globisz managed to qualify the team for the 1999 FIFA U-17 World Championship in New Zealand. However, the team did not make it out of the group stage.

In the 2000–01 season, the under-18s led by Globisz qualified for the 2001 UEFA European Under-18 Championship by eliminating England in the second qualifying round. The tournament began in July 2001 in Finland. The Poles topped their group beating Spain, Belgium and Denmark and advanced to the final, where they defeated Czech Republic 3–1.

Globisz notably coached players such as Tomasz Kuszczak, Paweł Golański, Sebastian Mila, Rafał Grzelak, Łukasz Madej, Wojciech Łobodziński, Radosław Matusiak as well as brothers Paweł Brożek and Piotr Brożek.

Globisz replaced Andrzej Sikorski as the new coach of the players born around 1987 in January 2002. He was unsuccessful in qualifying for the 2004 UEFA Euro Under-17. Poland automatically qualified for the 2006 UEFA Euro Under-19, since they were the host nation. The Poles qualified for the 2007 FIFA U-20 World Cup in Canada, after finishing their qualifying group in third place.

The World Cup took place in July 2007, and started with Poland winning 1–0 over Brazil. They lost to the United States and then managed to draw against South Korea. Poland qualified for the next round and was matched against the eventual winners Argentina. They lost the match 3–1, with Dawid Janczyk scoring the only goal for Poland.

From 2006, Globisz took charge of the under-17s. In 2007, the team were eliminated in the second qualifying phase for the 2007 UEFA European Under-17 Championship.

== Personal life ==
Globisz is commemorated by a star at the MOSiR Stadium in Gdańsk. The "Avenue of Stars" commemorates the efforts and success of former players and coaches.

== Honours ==
Poland U18

- UEFA European Under-18 Championship: 2001

Poland U16

- UEFA European Under-16 Championship third place: 1999
