= Czesław Bartolik =

Polish association football player and manager

Personal information
- Full name: Czesław Bartolik
- Date of birth: 16 April 1918
- Place of birth: Saint Petersburg, Russian SFSR
- Date of death: 29 March 2008 (aged 89)
- Place of death: Gdynia, Poland
- Height: 1.69 m (5 ft 7 in)
- Position: Forward

Youth career
- 1933–1937: KS Gdynia

Senior career*
Years	Team	Apps	(Gls)
1937–1938	Arka Gdynia		
1938–1939	Gedania Danzig		
1940	Wisła Kraków		
1941–1942	Garbarnia Kraków		
1943–1944	Groble Kraków		
1945–1948	Gedania Gdańsk		
1948–1949	Bałtyk Gdynia		
1951	Lechia Gdańsk	1	(0)

Managerial career
- 1948–1949: Bałtyk Gdynia
- 1950–1953: Lechia Gdańsk
- 1953–1954: Odra Opole
- 1954–1955: Arka Gdynia
- 1955–1957: Stoczniowiec Gdańsk
- 1958–1960: Bałtyk Gdynia
- 1960–1961: Lechia Gdańsk II
- 1961–1964: Flota Gdynia
- 1964–1967: MS Batory
- * Club domestic league appearances and goals

Czesław Bartolik (16 April 1918 – 29 March 2008) was a Polish football player and manager.

== Senior career ==
Bartolik was born on 16 April 1918. He started his career with the youth team of KS Gdynia before starting his professional career with Arka Gdynia in 1937–38, and Gedania Danzig from 1938–39. In 1939 Gedania Danzig was banned from partaking in sports events by the Nazi Party during the Occupation of Poland. Due to the outbreak of World War II Bartolik was moved to Kraków, where he played for Wisła Kraków, Garbarnia Kraków, and Groble Kraków from 1940-44 playing in the underground Kraków Occupation Championships. After the war ended he moved back to Danzig, now named Gdańsk, to play for Gedania Gdańsk (the same team re-created after its banning in 1939). After three years, Bartolik moved to Bałtyk Gdynia where he became a player-manager.

== Managerial career ==
Bałtyk Gdynia was the start of his time in management. In 1950, he moved to Lechia Gdańsk as manager, where in 1951 he also played in the league for a final time. In 1951, he guided Lechia to the Ekstraklasa, getting promoted from the II liga. After Lechia, he had spells with Odra Opole, Arka Gdynia, Stoczniowiec Gdańsk, Bałtyk again and Flota Gdynia. In 1964, he managed a team for the Polish Ocean Lines ship MS Batory where he won the Atlantic League in 1966.

== Death ==
Bartolik died on 29 March 2008, aged 89. He was buried in the Orłowo district of Gdynia.

== Honours ==
=== Manager ===
Lechia Gdańsk

- II liga, group I: 1951

Bałtyk Gdynia

- Regional league Gdańsk: 1959
