= Witold Kulik =

Polish footballer (born 1957)

Personal information
- Full name: Witold Józef Kulik
- Date of birth: 4 August 1956 (age 70)
- Place of birth: Poland

Senior career*
Years	Team	Apps	(Gls)
- Stoczniowiec Gdańsk

Managerial career
- 1994–1995: Polonia Gdańsk
- 1998–1999: Lechia Gdańsk
- * Club domestic league appearances and goals

Witold Kulik (born 4 August 1957) is a former Polish football player and manager, and current member of the Pruszcz Gdański council.

== Career ==
Kulik played for Stoczniowiec Gdańsk during his professional career, and also managed Stoczniowiec, then known as Polonia Gdańsk, for the 1994–95 season. As manager he led Polonia to the III liga title, finishing ten points clear of second place Elana Toruń with the team scoring 99 goals in the league. Despite winning the league, Kulik was not kept as the manager for the following season. In 1998–99 Kulik was chosen to be the new manager of the Lechia Gdańsk first team, working closely with former Lechia manager Stanisław Stachura. Lechia had an average season, finishing mid-table, and both Kulik and Stachura were released from their roles at the end of the season.

== After football ==
After football Kulik went into politics, and has been on the Pruszcz Gdański council since 2010. Kulik has been the owner of a goods shop called "Ewelina" in Pruszcz Gdański since 1995.

== Honours ==
Polonia Gdańsk

- III liga (Gdańsk group) 1994–95
