= Jerzy Słaboszowski =

Polish footballer and manager

Personal information
- Full name: Jerzy Aleksander Słaboszowski
- Date of birth: 4 April 1932
- Place of birth: Kraków, Poland
- Date of death: 4 April 1981 (aged 49)
- Place of death: Gudniki, Poland
- Position: Defender

Senior career*
Years	Team	Apps	(Gls)
1947–1951	Mieszko Piast Cieszyn		
1952–1954	Cracovia	32	(0)
1955–1960	Legia Warsaw	55	(0)
1960–1961	Lublinianka		
1962–1964	Warszawianka		

Managerial career
- 1970–1971: Lechia Gdańsk
- 1971–1975: Arka Gdynia
- 1975–1976: Al Ahli Dubai
- Al Jazeera Zuwara
- –1980: Stilon Gorzów Wielkopolski
- 1980–1981: Olimpia Elbląg
- * Club domestic league appearances and goals

Jerzy Słaboszowski (4 April 1932 – either 2 or 4 April 1981) also sometimes written as Jerzy Słaboszewski was a football player and manager. During his playing career Słaboszowski played for Mieszko Piast Cieszyn, Cracovia, Legia Warsaw, Lublinianka, and Warszawianka. His greatest spell coming with Legia, winning the Polish Cup in 1955 and the league in the same year. During his coaching career he managed Lechia Gdańsk, finishing runners up in the league, also managing Arka Gdynia, Stilon Gorzów Wielkopolski and Olimpia Elbląg. Słaboszowski was the first Polish manager to manage in both Libya and the United Arab Emirates, managing both Al Jazeera Zuwara and Al Ahli Dubai, the latter with whom he won the 1975–76 United Arab Emirates league.

There uncertainty on which date Słaboszowski died, with sources listing either 2 April 1981 or that he died on his birthday on 4 April 1981, this would either put his age as 48 or 49 at his time of death.

== Honours ==
Legia Warsaw

- I liga
  - Winners: 1955
- Polish Cup
  - Winners: 1955

Lechia Gdańsk

- III liga
  - Runners-up: 1970-71

Al Ahli Dubai

- UAE Football League
  - Winners: 1975–76
