= Grzegorz Polakow =

Polish football manager (born 1935)

Personal information
- Date of birth: 10 March 1935 (age 91)
- Place of birth: Vilnius, Poland

Youth career
- Years: Team
- Lechia Gdańsk

Managerial career
- 1959: Jedność Gościcino
- 1959–1960: Grom Wejherowo
- 1960: Zawisza Bydgoszcz
- 1962–1965: Meduza Gdańsk
- 1965–1971: Arka Gdynia
- 1971–1973: Stoczniowiec Gdańsk
- 1974: Bałtyk Gdynia
- 1975: ŁKS Łódź
- 1976: Lechia Gdańsk
- 1979: Kenya
- 1980: Cracovia
- 1981: Odra Opole
- 1981: Arka Gdynia
- 1988: Stal Stalowa Wola
- 1988–1989: Bałtyk Gdynia
- 1994: Bałtyk Gdynia
- 1995: Arka Gdynia

Grzegorz Polakow (born 10 March 1935) is a Polish former football manager who spent the majority of his career managing teams in the Pomeranian area.

== Career ==
Born in Vilnius, which was then part of Poland, Polakow's family will have moved to Gdańsk during the Polish population transfers. He played in the Lechia youth teams but never progressed to the first team. After failing to become a footballer, Polakow became a football manager at the age of 24, starting with small village and town teams of Jedność Gościcino in Gościcino and Grom Wejherowo in Wejherowo. Polakow's first big move in management was with Zawisza Bydgoszcz who he joined in 1960. He helped Zawisza get promoted to the I liga for the first time in their history, but wasn't in place for their first season of top flight football. Polakow managed Meduza Gdańsk for four seasons from 1962 to 1965. In 1965 Polakow moved to manage Arka Gdynia, spending six seasons at the club, which would be his longest spell at one club. During his time at Arka he experienced a relegation, before being promoted straight away the season after. He moved to Stoczniowiec Gdańsk in 1971, once again winning promotion with a team securing promotion to the II liga winning the league in the 1972–73 season. In 1974 he managed Bałtyk Gdynia, ŁKS Łódź in 1975, and Lechia Gdańsk in 1976, with whom he helped to finish runners-up with in the II liga. After three years out of management, Polakow took charge of the Kenya national team in 1979, before returning to Poland to manage Cracovia the following year. He had two more short spells with Odra Opole and again with Arka Gdynia, both spells were in 1981, before taking another break from management until 1988 when he joined Stal Stalowa Wola, and then with Bałtyk Gdynia from 1988 to 1989. After another break, Polakow returned to management for the final time with Bałtyk Gdynia in 1994, and finally once more with Arka Gdynia, being part of the 1994–95 season when Arka was in turmoil, having five different managers over the course of the season. After this spell with Arka, Polakow retired from management in 1995.

== Honours ==
Zawisza Bydgoszcz

- II liga North runner-up: 1960

Arka Gdynia

- III liga, group IV: 1968–69

Stoczniowiec Gdańsk

- III liga, group IV: 1972–73

Lechia Gdańsk

- II liga North runner-up: 1975–76
