= Bogusław Kaczmarek =

Polish footballer and manager

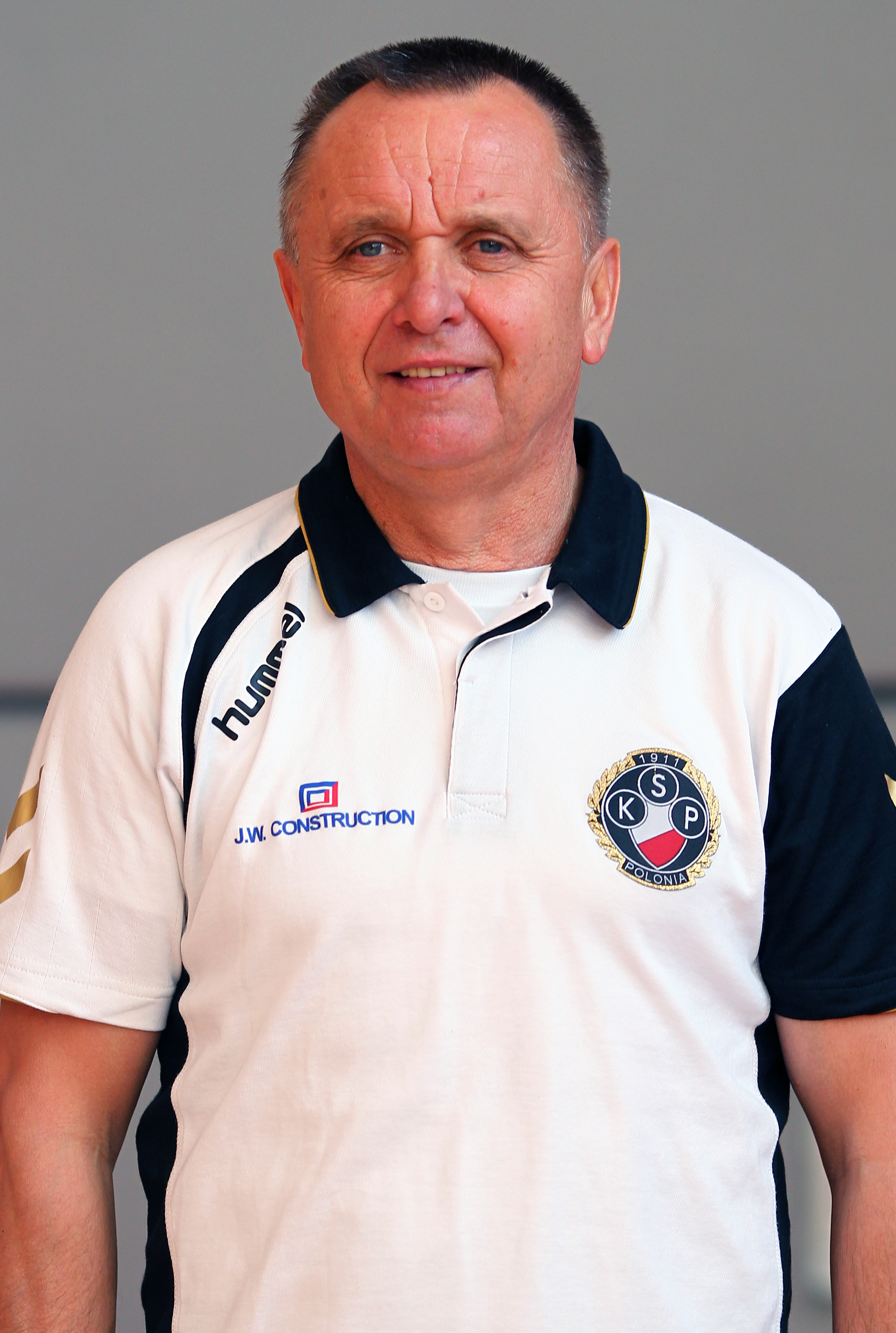
- Kaczmarek in 2011

Personal information
- Date of birth: 6 March 1950 (age 76)
- Place of birth: Łódź, Poland
- Positions: Defender; midfielder

Youth career
- Start Łódź

Senior career*
Years	Team	Apps	(Gls)
- Hala Sportowa Łódź
- MRKS Gdańsk
- Stoczniowiec Gdańsk
1975–1977	Lechia Gdańsk		
1977–1981	Arka Gdynia		
- Rovaniemen Palloseura
- Östärtelje IF
1982–1983	Pittsburgh Spirit		

Managerial career
- 1984–1992: Lechia Gdańsk
- 1992–1993: Stomil Olsztyn
- 1993: Zawisza Bydgoszcz
- 1993–1995: Stomil Olsztyn
- 1995–1996: Sokół Tychy
- 1997: GKS Bełchatów
- 1997–1998: Petrochemia Płock
- 1999–2000: Stomil Olsztyn
- 2000–2001: GKS Katowice
- 2001–2003: Dyskobolia Grodzisk Wielkopolski
- 2004–2005: Górnik Łęczna
- 2008: Arka Gdynia
- 2009: Polonia Warsaw
- 2012–2013: Lechia Gdańsk
- * Club domestic league appearances and goals

Bogusław Kaczmarek (born 6 March 1950) is a Polish former professional football manager and player.

== Personal life ==
Kaczmarek is commemorated by a star at the MOSiR Stadium in Gdańsk. The "Avenue of Stars" commemorates the efforts and successes of former players and coaches.

He is the father of manager and former footballer Marcin.

== Honours ==
=== Player ===
MRKS Gdańsk

- Regional league Gdańsk: 1972–73

=== Manager ===
Stomil Olsztyn

- II liga, group II: 1994–95
