= Piotr Nierychło =

Polish footballer and manager

Personal information
- Full name: Piotr Nierychło
- Date of birth: 29 April 1921
- Place of birth: Miechowice, Poland
- Date of death: 29 February 1976 (aged 54)
- Place of death: Gdańsk, Poland
- Height: 1.69 m (5 ft 7 in)
- Position: Midfielder

Senior career*
Years	Team	Apps	(Gls)
- AKS Chorzów
1946–1952	Lechia Gdańsk	75	(2)

Managerial career
- 1957–1960: Lechia Gdańsk II
- 1960–1961: Lechia Gdańsk
- 1962: Arka Gdynia
- * Club domestic league appearances and goals

Piotr Nierychło (29 April 1921 – 29 February 1976) was a Polish football player and manager.

== Football ==
Nierychło started his playing career with AKS Chorzów. In 1946 he joined Lechia Gdańsk, with whom he played for 6 seasons playing a total of 76 games. Despite only scoring 2 goals for Lechia he scored Lechia's first goal in the Polish top division, scoring against Cracovia from a direct freekick.

After his playing career Nierychło moved into management, first managing the Lechia Gdańsk second team from 1957 to 1960. During his time with the Lechia II team, he led the team to the junior championship title. In 1960 Nierychło became the manager of the Lechia first team, leaving the role in 1961.
