= Stanisław Stachura =

Polish association football player and manager

Personal information
- Full name: Stanisław Stachura
- Date of birth: 22 April 1941 (age 85)
- Place of birth: Łódź, Poland
- Height: 1.72 m (5 ft 8 in)
- Position: Midfielder

Senior career*
Years	Team	Apps	(Gls)
1952–1960	ŁKS Łódź		
1961–1963	Legia Warsaw	12	(0)
1963–1964	AZS-AWF Warsaw		
1964–1968	ŁKS Łódź		
1969	IFK Trollhättan		

Managerial career
- 1973–1975: Górnik Wałbrzych
- 1975–1976: ŁKS Łódź
- 1981–1983: Olimpia Elbląg
- 1985–1987: Bałtyk Gdynia
- 1988–1989: Lechia Gdańsk
- 1993–1994: Arka Gdynia
- 1995: Pomezania Malbork
- 1996: Olimpia-Lechia Gdańsk
- 2000–2002: Lechia-Polonia Gdańsk
- * Club domestic league appearances and goals

Stanisław Stachura (born 22 April 1941) is a Polish former football player and manager.

== Football ==
Stachura started football in the city of his birth with ŁKS Łódź, where he played from 1952-60. His time with ŁKS was successful, winning both the league and the Polish Cup during his time with the team, as well as finishing both runner-up and third place in the league during his eight years with the club. After his time with ŁKS, he moved to Legia Warsaw during the 1960-61 season. His time at Legia was not as successful, and he only managed 12 appearances in three seasons with the club. After Legia, Stachura went to AZS-AWF Warsaw before returning to ŁKS Łódź for four more seasons, and then moved to Sweden for a season playing for IFK Trollhättan.

After his playing career, Stachura moved into coaching and management. His first job in management was with Górnik Wałbrzych. After Górnik he returned to coach ŁKS Łódź in 1975-76, before spells with Olimpia Elbląg and Bałtyk Gdynia. In 1988 he joined Lechia Gdańsk, a club he managed a total of three times. After a brief spell with Arka Gdynia in 1993-94, and Pomezania Malbork in 1995, Stachura rejoined Lechia Gdańsk in 1996, with the club playing under the Olimpia-Lechia Gdańsk name, having been created by a merger from Lechia Gdańsk and Olimpia Poznań. He managed Lechia for a final time between 2000–02, this time under the name Lechia-Polonia Gdańsk after the merger of Lechia and Polonia Gdańsk, meaning Stachura is the only manager who has managed the original and current Lechia team as well as the two teams created from mergers.

== Honours ==
ŁKS Łódź

- Ekstraklasa: 1958
- Ekstraklasa runner-up: 1954
- Ekstraklasa third place: 1957
- Polish Cup: 1956–57
