= Jerzy Jastrzębowski =

Polish footballer and manager

Personal information
- Date of birth: 14 January 1951 (age 75)
- Place of birth: Gdańsk, Poland
- Position: Midfielder

Youth career
- 1963–1968: Lechia Gdańsk

Senior career*
Years	Team	Apps	(Gls)
1967–1974	Lechia Gdańsk	87	(23)
1974–1976	Zawisza Bydgoszcz		(2)
1976–1978	Budowlani Bydgoszcz		
1978–1980	Goplania Inowrocław		

Managerial career
- 1981–1982: Lechia Gdańsk II
- 1982–1984: Lechia Gdańsk
- 1984–1986: Gryf Słupsk
- 1986–1987: Igloopol Dębica
- 1987–1989: Arka Gdynia
- 1989–1991: Miedź Legnica
- 1991–1992: Igloopol Dębica
- 1992–1995: Pomezania Malbork
- 1995–1996: Polonia Gdańsk
- 1996–1997: Pomezania Malbork
- 1997–1999: Jeziorak Iława
- 1999–2000: Lechia-Polonia Gdańsk
- 2000–2002: Sparta Brodnica
- 2002–2003: Unia Tczew
- 2003–2004: Lechia Gdańsk
- 2004–2005: Sparta Brodnica
- 2005–2006: Jeziorak Iława
- 2006–2009: Bałtyk Gdynia
- 2009–2010: Orzeł Trąbki Wielkie
- 2011: Kaszubia Kościerzyna
- 2011–2013: Cartusia Kartuzy
- 2015: Gryf 2009 Tczew
- 2015–2019: Bałtyk Gdynia II
- 2020–2021: Bałtyk Gdynia
- 2021: Bałtyk Gdynia III
- 2022: Stolem Gniewino
- 2022–2024: Powiśle Dierzgoń
- * Club domestic league appearances and goals

Jerzy "Jastrząb" Jastrzębowski (born 14 January 1951) is a Polish professional football manager and former player. Jastrzębowski has spent the majority of his career managing teams in the Pomeranian area.

== Managerial career ==
Jastrzębowski started his managerial career at the age of 30, managing the Lechia Gdańsk youth teams before taking the position as the manager of the first team. Despite Lechia being his first job, it has arguably been his most successful job. Despite Lechia being in the third tier, the team won the Polish Cup and the subsequent Polish Super Cup in 1983, as well as winning their division. This led to Lechia playing in a European competition for the first time, while only being in the second tier. Lechia were drawn against Juventus and eventually lost 2–10 on aggregate. At the end of the season, he again won the league with Lechia, and they were promoted to the Ekstraklasa. Jastrzębowski wasn't in charge of Lechia in the Ekstraklasa however as he left for Gryf Słupsk at the end of the season. After leaving Lechia, Jastrzębowski has gone on to manage a further 15 teams, including Arka Gdynia, Bałtyk Gdynia, Polonia Gdańsk, and Lechia twice more, once being during the Lechia-Polonia merger.

== Personal life ==
Jastrzębowski is commemorated by a star at the MOSiR Stadium in Gdańsk. The "Avenue of Stars" commemorates the efforts and success of former players and coaches.

== Honours ==
=== Player ===
Lechia Gdańsk

- III liga Poznań: 1971–72

Budowlani Bydgoszcz

- III liga, group I: 1976–77

=== Manager ===
Lechia Gdańsk

- II liga, group I: 1983–84
- III liga, group II: 1982–83
- IV liga Pomerania: 2003–04
- Polish Cup: 1982–83
- Polish Super Cup: 1983

Arka Gdynia

- III liga Pomerania: 1987–88

Pomezania Malbork

- III liga Pomerania: 1993–94

Unia Tczew

- IV liga Pomerania: 2001–02

Bałtyk Gdynia II

- Klasa A Gdańsk I: 2016–17
- Klasa B Gdańsk II: 2015–16
