= Václav Křížek =

Czech association football manager

Personal information
- Full name: Václav Křížek
- Date of birth: 14 April 1903
- Place of birth: Prague, Austria-Hungary
- Position: Midfielder

Senior career*
Years	Team	Apps	(Gls)
1925–1926	SK Libeň	27	(7)
1927–1931	Viktoria Žižkov	33	(1)
1931–1932	Slavia Prague	6	(0)
1932–1933	SK Libeň	13	(0)

Managerial career
- 1948–1949: Warta Poznań
- 1949: Lechia Gdańsk
- 1950: Marymont Warsaw
- 1952: Armaturka Ústí nad Labem
- * Club domestic league appearances and goals

Václav Křížek (14 April 1903 – date of death unknown) was a Czech footballer and manager.

== Coaching career ==
In 1949, Křížek became the manager of Lechia Gdańsk, and was the first non-Polish manager in the club's history. When he joined Lechia, they were in their first season in the Polish top division. Křížek was unable to keep the team in the division, and was in charge of the team's 8–0 defeat to Polonia Bytom, the result is still the worst defeat in Lechia's history.

== Death ==
Little is known about Křížek's death other than that he died after 1969, and most likely died in France.
