= Zygmunt Czyżewski =

Polish association football player

Personal information
- Full name: Zygmunt Jan Czyżewski
- Date of birth: 4 October 1910
- Place of birth: Lemberg, Austria-Hungary
- Date of death: 17 January 1998 (aged 87)
- Place of death: Wrocław, Poland
- Height: 1.69 m (5 ft 7 in)
- Position: Midfielder

Youth career
- Czarni Lwów

Senior career*
Years	Team	Apps	(Gls)
1929–1939	Czarni Lwów	59	(2)
1940–1941	Dinamo Lviv		
1944–1945	Dinamo Lviv		
1945	Baltia Gdańsk	4	(2)
1946–1948	ŁKS Łódź	5	(0)

Managerial career
- 1945–1946: Baltia Gdańsk/Lechia Gdańsk
- 1951: Arkonia Szczecin
- 1953: Pogoń Szczecin
- Pafawag Wrocław
- Ślęza Wrocław
- 1960–1961: Śląsk Wrocław
- 1962–1963: Pogoń Szczecin
- * Club domestic league appearances and goals

Zygmunt Czyżewski (Ice Hockey)
- Played for: Czarni Lwów (1926–39), Dinamo Lviv (1939–45), ŁKS Łódź (1945–49)
- National team: Poland
- Playing career: 1929–1949

Zygmunt Czyżewski (4 October 1910 – 17 January 1998) was a Polish former ice hockey and football player and football manager.

== Football ==
Czyżewski began his football career with Czarni Lwów, with whom he his known to have spent his five seasons with playing in the I liga. During his time with Czarni, Czyżewski played at least 59 times scoring 2 goals. During the war it is known that Czyżewski had two spells with Dinamo Lviv, but did not play football professionally again until 1945. It after the expulsion of Poles from Lwów, which became known as Lviv after the war when he joined many people from Lviv moving to Gdańsk and played for the newly created football team which became Lechia Gdańsk. At Lechia he had the role of player/manager, being Lechia's first ever manager, where he played 4 games scoring 2 goals, and won the league being promoted from to the second tier. After Lechia he joined ŁKS Łódź where he is known to have played for three seasons. After his playing career he held roles in management with Arkonia Szczecin, Pogoń Szczecin, Pafawag Wrocław, Ślęza Wrocław, and Śląsk Wrocław.

== Ice hockey ==
Czyżewski also started playing ice hockey with Czarni Lwów. He spent 12 seasons with Czarni before the outbreak of the war disrupted the league and caused Czarni Lwów to disband. While at Czarni, he won the Ekstraklasa in 1935 and finished runners-up in 1934. During the interwar years Czyżewski played with Dinamo Lviv, before joining up with ŁKS Łódź after leaving football team Lechia Gdańsk. He spent 5 seasons with ŁKS finishing runners up and in third place in the Ekstraklasa during this time. He represented Poland in two World Championships in 1939 and 1947, making six appearances in total.

== Honours ==
=== Ice Hockey ===
Czarni Lwów

- Ekstraklasa
  - Winners: 1935
  - Runners-up: 1934

ŁKS Łódź

- Ekstraklasa
  - Runners-up: 1946
  - Third place: 1947
