= Bogumił Gozdur =

Polish association football player

Personal information
- Date of birth: 1 September 1935
- Place of birth: Kielce, Poland
- Date of death: 3 May 2017 (aged 81)
- Place of death: Kielce, Poland

Youth career
- –1950: AKS Alejki
- 1951–: Gwardia Kielce

Senior career*
Years	Team	Apps	(Gls)
–1954	Gwardia Kielce		
1955–1958	AZS-AWF Warsaw		
1959	Warszawianka		

Managerial career
- 1959–1962: Gryf Gościcino
- 1964–1967: Bałtyk Gdynia
- 1967–1970: Lechia Gdańsk
- 1972–1973: Bałtyk Gdynia
- 1973–1977: Korona Kielce
- 1977–?: Błękitni Kielce
- 1986: Korona Kielce
- * Club domestic league appearances and goals

Bogumił Gozdur (1 September 1935 – 3 May 2017) was a Polish football player and manager. His playing and coaching career was spent between three cities, the city of his birth, Kielce, while spending time as a player in Warsaw and as a manager in the Tricity.

== Biography ==
Born in Kielce Gozdur started playing youth football for his local side AKS Alejki until the age of 15. From 1951 until 1954 played for Gwardia Kielce, starting in the youth sides, appearing in the first team at some point during that time. In 1955 he moved to Warsaw to study at the University of Physical Education, playing for the universities football team, AZS-AWF Warsaw, during his studies. After completing his studies he played one season with Warszawianka. Aged 24 Gozdur had decided his playing career was over, and moved to Gdańsk to become the manager of Gryf Gościcino in 1959. By 1964 he had moved to Bałtyk Gdynia, where during his 3 seasons with the club, they won the III liga (Gdańsk group) twice, failing to win promotion to the II liga through the playoffs. In 1967 he moved to Lechia Gdańsk for three seasons, finishing 2nd and 3rd in the III liga. After his spell at Lechia, he once again joined Bałtyk Gdynia for the 1972–73 season, finally helping them to achieve promotion out of the league, finishing runners-up. After helping Bałtyk to promotion, he moved back to Kielce, becoming manager of the newly created Korona Kielce. In his first spell at Korona he achieved promotion the second tier in the 1974–75 season. Their spell in II liga did not last long, and the team were relegated after only one season. In 1977 he moved to Korona rivals Błękitni Kielce, where he achieved 2 promotions and 1 relegation in his first 3 years at the club. In 1986 he became manager of Korona for a second time before retiring from football management. He died on 3 May 2017 and is buried in the Municipal Cemetery in Kielce.

== Honours ==
Bałtyk Gdynia

- Regional league Gdańsk: 1964–65, 1965–66

Korona Kielce

- III liga Kielce: 1974–75

Błękitni Kielce

- III liga, group III: 1977–78, 1979–80

== Awards ==
- Silver Cross of Merit
- Gold Meritorious Activist of Physical Culture Badge
- PZPN Gold Award
- PZPN Silver Award
- Kielce District Football Association - Gold Award
- Gdańsk District Football Association - Gold Award
