= Lajos Szolár =

Hungarian football manager

Personal information
- Full name: Lajos Szolár
- Date of birth: 12 August 1919
- Place of birth: Budapest, Hungary
- Date of death: 24 September 2005 (aged 86)

Managerial career
- Years: Team
- 1960: Ruch Chorzów
- 1961: Lechia Gdańsk

Lajos Szolár (Lajos Szollár; 12 August 1919 – September 24 2005) was a Hungarian football manager who managed in Poland.

== Football ==
Szolár's first management experience in football was with Ruch Chorzów in 1960. He took over the position as the club's manager after the sudden death of János Steiner, who was managing the team at the time. Szolár left Ruch after 6 months, before becoming Lechia Gdańsk's manager months later. He spent a season with Lechia, managing 25 games in total. With 9 wins, he is still Lechia's most successful foreign manager.
