= Roman Rogocz =

Polish footballer

Personal information
- Full name: Roman Rogocz
- Date of birth: 9 August 1926
- Place of birth: Chorzów, Poland
- Date of death: 7 February 2013 (aged 86)
- Place of death: Gdańsk, Poland
- Position: Striker

Youth career
- AKS Chorzów

Senior career*
Years	Team	Apps	(Gls)
1947–1962	Lechia Gdańsk	161	(107)

Managerial career
- 1962–1963: Lechia Gdańsk
- 1971–1972: Lechia Gdańsk
- 1972–1975: Lechia Gdańsk (youth)
- * Club domestic league appearances and goals

Roman Rogocz (9 August 1926 – 7 February 2013) was a Polish footballer who spent his entire professional career with Lechia Gdańsk. He is Lechia’s all time leading goalscorer, and is the only player for the club who has scored over 100 goals.

== Early years ==
Rogocz started playing football with AKS Chorzów, however his possible footballing career was halted by the outbreak of World War II. In 1943, Rogocz was deported to Germany at the age of 17. He managed to escape and found his way to Italy, which by this time had joined the Allies. He found General Anders army, and joined the 2nd Warsaw Panzer Division. While stationed with the army Rogocz was able to showcase his talents, and was one of the best players of the 2nd Warsaw Division.

== Senior career ==
Rogocz joined Lechia Gdańsk after a promise he made with a friend during his time in the army, that both men would play for the same football team. As Leszek Goździk had family in Gdańsk he joined Lechia, and Rogocz followed suit joining the club in 1947. During his time with Lechia, Rogocz proved himself to have a great goal scoring ability. During the 1956 Ekstraklasa season, Rogocz helped Lechia to achieve their highest ever position, and finish 3rd. After a career with Lechia which spanned 15 seasons, Rogocz called time on his Lechia Gdańsk career at the age of 36. During his time there he scored a total of 109 goals in all competitions, the most goals scored for the club, and a record which still stands today.

== After football ==
Rogocz served as the team's manager on two separate occasions, from 1962–63 and 1971-72. After his second spell, Rogocz also served as the youth team manager from 1972-75. The time spent between his managerial periods and after his job as the youth team manager, his time was spent as a coach for Lechia, mainly focusing on the youth teams.

Rogocz is commemorated by a star at the MOSiR Stadium in Gdańsk. The "Avenue of Stars" commemorates the efforts and success of former players and coaches.

== Death ==
Rogocz died on 7 February 2013 following a long battle with an illness. He is buried in the Garrison Cemetery in Gdańsk.

== Awards ==
- 2011: Order of Polonia Restituta, for achievements in football and its popularization
