= Janusz Pekowski =

Polish football coach (born 1945)

Personal information
- Date of birth: 22 November 1945 (age 80)
- Place of birth: Golub-Dobrzyń, Poland

Senior career*
Years	Team	Apps	(Gls)
- Energetyk Poznań

Managerial career
- 1973–1975: Lech Poznań
- 1975–1976: Stoczniowiec Gdańsk
- 1976: Widzew Łódź
- 1977: Arka Gdynia
- 1978–1979: Lechia Gdańsk
- 1981–1982: Degerfors IF
- 1985: Panachaiki
- 1995–1996: Pogoń Szczecin
- 1997: Stilon Gorzów
- * Club domestic league appearances and goals

Janusz Pekowski (born 22 November 1945) is a Polish former football manager and player.

== Playing career ==
Pekowski was born in Golub-Dobrzyń. He played for Energetyk Poznań.

== Coaching career ==
Pekowski managed Lech Poznań, Widzew Łódź, Arka Gdynia, Lechia Gdańsk, Degerfors IF, Pogoń Szczecin and Stilon Gorzów.
