= Stilon Gorzów Wielkopolski =

Polish football club

- Full name: Klub Sportowy Stilon Gorzów Wielkopolski
- Nicknames: Stilonowcy (Stilon's); Niebiesko-Biali (The Blue and Whites); Tasmanian Devils; Duma Gorzowa (The Pride of Gorzów); Duma Zachodu (The Pride of West Poland)
- Founded: 1947; 79 years ago (as Jedwabnik Gorzów Wielkopolski); 1987; 39 years ago (refounded as GKP Gorzów Wielkopolski); 2007; 19 years ago (refounded as Stilon Gorzów Wielkopolski)
- Ground: Stadion OSiR
- Capacity: 5,000
- Chairman: Mariusz Kaczorek
- Manager: Karol Gliwiński
- League: III liga, group III
- 2025–26: IV liga Lubusz, 2nd of 18 (promoted via play-offs)
- Website: https://stilon.gorzow.pl
Home colours	Away colours

Stilon Gorzów Wielkopolski is a Polish football club based in Gorzów Wielkopolski. The club currently plays in group III of the III liga, the fourth tier of Polish football.

== History ==
The club was founded in 1947. In the 1991–92 Polish Cup, they reached the semi-finals. In 1997, the club was relegated from the III liga, currently known as the II liga, which forced them to withdraw from the IV liga, now known as the III liga, for a year due to a horrible financial situation. On 30 April 2011, the club was officially dissolved, the reason was financial problems and mainly not being able to pay the staff and players' wages. After the 2010–11 I liga season they were re-established, and in 2013 began playing in the III liga where they remained until relegation to the IV liga Lubusz in 2025.

== Former managers ==
Notable managers
Manager	From	To
(Poland) Kazimierz Lisiewicz	July 1996	1997
(Poland) Jan Jucha	1997	1997
(Poland) Janusz Pekowski	1997	1997
(Poland) Zbigniew Stefaniak	1997	1998
(Poland) Tadeusz Babij	1998	1999
(Poland) Krzysztof Woziński	1999	2000
(Poland) Zenon Burzawa	2000	2001
(Poland) Leszek Janowiak	2001	2002
(Poland) Włodzimierz Stronczyński	2002	2003
(Poland) Zenon Burzawa	3 March 2003	17 July 2005
(Poland) Andrzej Rejman	17 July 2005	1 July 2006
(Poland) Marek Czerniawski	1 July 2006	26 April 2007
(Poland) Mariusz Kuras	26 April 2007	21 June 2007
(Poland) Grzegorz Kowalski	21 June 2007	29 August 2008
(Poland) Czesław Jakołcewicz	31 August 2008	17 November 2008
(Poland) Mieczysław Broniszewski	5 December 2008	28 April 2009
(Poland) Adam Topolski	28 April 2009	28 April 2009
