= Hrabětice =

- Municipality
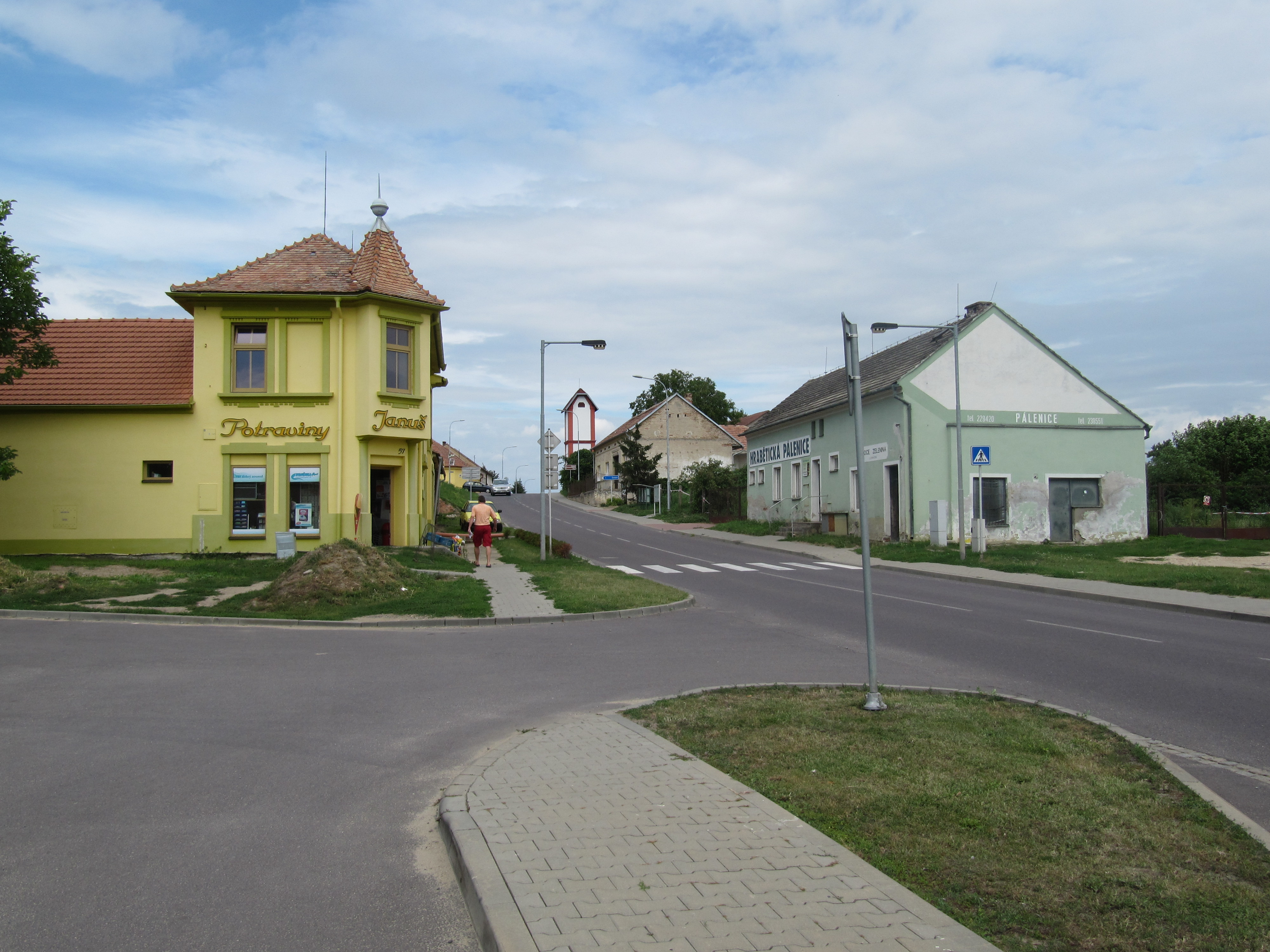
- Centre of Hrabětice

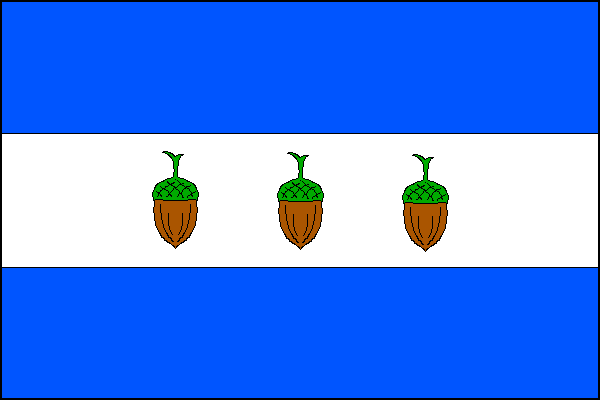
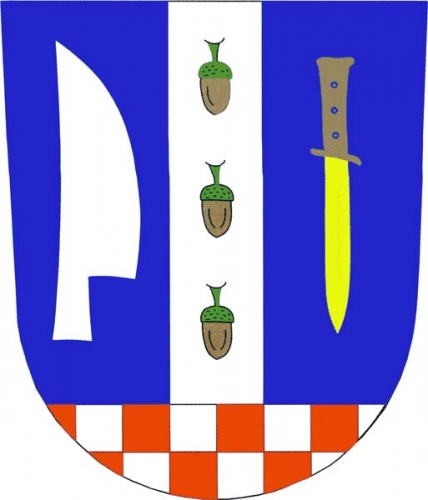
- Flag Coat of arms

- Location in the Czech Republic
- Coordinates: 48°47′52″N 16°23′36″E
- Country: Czech Republic
- Region: South Moravian
- District: Znojmo
- First mentioned: 1417

Area
  - Total: 16.04 km^{2} (6.19 sq mi)
- Elevation: 195 m (640 ft)

Population (2026-01-01)
  - Total: 912
  - Density: 56.9/km^{2} (147/sq mi)
- Time zone: UTC+1 (CET)
  - Summer (DST): UTC+2 (CEST)
- Postal code: 671 68
- Website: www.hrabetice.eu

Hrabětice (German: Grafendorf) is a municipality and village in Znojmo District in the South Moravian Region of the Czech Republic. It has about 900 inhabitants.

Hrabětice lies approximately 29 kilometres (18 mi) east of Znojmo, 48 km (30 mi) south of Brno, and 204 km (127 mi) south-east of Prague.

== History ==
The first written mention of Hrabětice is from 1417.

== Demographics ==
Historical population
Year	Pop.	±%
1869	779	—
1880	974	+25.0%
1890	1,163	+19.4%
1900	1,315	+13.1%
1910	1,555	+18.3%
1921	1,564	+0.6%
1930	1,605	+2.6%
1950	1,135	−29.3%
1961	1,219	+7.4%
1970	1,122	−8.0%
1980	941	−16.1%
1991	877	−6.8%
2001	909	+3.6%
2011	865	−4.8%
2021	826	−4.5%
Source: Censuses
