= Zbigniew Tymiński =

Polish football coach and manager

Personal information
- Full name: Zbigniew Tymiński
- Date of birth: 19 August 1955 (age 71)
- Place of birth: Sopot, Poland

Senior career*
Years	Team	Apps	(Gls)
1973–1976	Lechia Gdańsk		
1977–1981	Gedania Gdańsk		
1998–1999	Lechia-Polonia Gdańsk III		

Managerial career
- 1993: Lechia Gdańsk
- 1997: GKP Brzeźno
- 1998: Lechia-Polonia Gdańsk II
- Czarni Pruszcz Gdański
- * Club domestic league appearances and goals

Zbigniew Tymiński (born 19 August 1955) is a Polish former football manager and player. He was Lechia Gdańsk's assistant manager from 1990 to 1993 and from 1997 to 1998, and was the club's first team manager in 1993.
