= Lawrence Papaleo =

American soccer player and coach

Personal information
- Full name: Lawrence Joseph Papaleo
- Date of birth: 22 December 1989 (age 36)
- Place of birth: Dallas, Texas, United States
- Height: 1.89 m (6 ft 2 in)
- Position: Forward

Youth career
- –2008: Christian Brothers Academy

College career
Years	Team	Apps	(Gls)
2008	Albany Great Danes	18	(4)
2009–2011	Syracuse Orange	28	(1)

Senior career*
Years	Team	Apps	(Gls)
2012	Bałtyk Gdynia	4	(0)

Managerial career
- Tri-Town Soccer (director of coaching)
- SUNY ESF (assistant)
- * Club domestic league appearances and goals

Lawrence Papaleo (born 22 December 1989) is an American real estate agent and former professional soccer player who played as a forward.

== Career ==
He netted his first college goal for Syracuse Orange in a 1–2 defeat to Hartwick College.

Trialling with Bałtyk Gdynia of the Polish third tier in 2012 for one week, Papaleo signed for the club, getting his work permit in February. Despite not being able to speak Polish, he was able to communicate with his teammates as they spoke English and helped him ensconce into the team.

== Personal life ==
The son of Joe and Maureen Papaleo, he has two sisters. Besides soccer clubs, Papaleo supports the American football team Dallas Cowboys and the New York Yankees baseball team.

== Honours ==
=== High school ===
- Second-team all state
- All-Central New York
- Conference Player of the Year
- Offensive Player of the Year
- Team MVP
- Red Bulls High School Cup participation

=== College ===
- East co-Rookie of the Week: 2008 (Albany)
- BIG EAST All-Academic Team: 2009, 2010 (Syracuse)
- Orange Alumni Award: 2010
- SU Athletic Director's Honor Roll: 2009, 2010, 2011 (Syracuse)
