= Zbigniew Kociołek =

Polish football manager (1945–2024)

Personal information
- Date of birth: 21 January 1945
- Place of birth: Pleszew, Poland
- Date of death: 18 September 2024 (aged 79)
- Place of death: Canada

Managerial career
- Years: Team
- Stoczniowiec Gdańsk
- 1985–1986: Legia Warsaw (assistant manager)
- 1987–1988: Lechia Gdańsk
- 1988–1989: Wisła Płock

Zbigniew Kociołek (21 January 1945 – 18 September 2024) was a Polish football manager.

== Management career ==
Kociołek had a brief spell in management roles of football, firstly becoming the manager of Stoczniowiec Gdańsk. Kociołek was the assistant manager at Legia Warsaw for a season, before managing Lechia Gdańsk for a season before being sacked after relegation, and then with Wisła Płock where he led the team to a third-place finish for the 1988–89 season before being sacked halfway through the next season.

== Death ==
Kociołek died in Canada on 18 September 2024, at the age of 79.

== Honours ==
Wisła Płock

- III liga, group IV third place: 1988–89
