= Tadeusz Małolepszy =

Polish football coach (born 1952)

Personal information
- Date of birth: 21 August 1952 (age 74)
- Place of birth: Gdańsk, Poland
- Position: Midfielder

Senior career*
Years	Team	Apps	(Gls)
1977–1978	Lechia Gdańsk	0	(0)

Managerial career
- 2001–2002: Lechia Gdańsk
- 2005–2007: SKS Torpedo Sopot
- 2009–2010: GKS Żukowo
- 2011–2012: LKS Orzeł Trąbki Wielkie
- * Club domestic league appearances and goals

Tadeusz Małolepszy (born 21 August 1952) is a Polish football coach.

== Career ==
Małolepszy played for Lechia, making his only appearance for the club against Stal Stalowa Wola in the Polish Cup. From 2001 to 2002 he was manager of Lechia. His footballing playing and managerial career never really took off, and he managed small, newly founded clubs; Torpedo Sopot, GKS Żukowo, and LKS Orzeł Trąbki Wielkie at different points between 2005 and 2012.
