= Edward Drabiński =

Polish footballer and manager

Personal information
- Full name: Edward Klemens Drabiński
- Date of birth: 6 June 1912
- Place of birth: Warsaw, Poland
- Date of death: 28 October 1995 (aged 83)
- Place of death: Warsaw, Poland
- Height: 1.71 m (5 ft 7 in)
- Position: Forward

Youth career
- 1927–1933: Legia Warsaw

Senior career*
Years	Team	Apps	(Gls)
1933–1938	Legia Warsaw	37	(6)
1938–1939	Warszawianka	3	(0)
1943–1945	Dundee United		
1945–1946	Dunfermline Athletic		
1947–1948	Legia Warsaw	4	(0)

Managerial career
- 1948: Legia Warsaw
- 1950–1951: ŁKS Łódź
- 1954–1955: Odra Opole
- 1955: Polonia Bydgoszcz
- 1961: Polonia Bytom
- 1962: Lechia Gdańsk
- 1963–1964: Lech Poznań
- 1964–1965: Raków Częstochowa
- 1966–1967: Gwardia Warsaw
- Pafawag Wrocław
- Start Łódź
- Bzura Chodaków
- 1971–1972: Piast Gliwice
- * Club domestic league appearances and goals

Edward Klemens Drabiński (6 June 1912 – 28 October 1995) was a Polish football player and manager.

== Football pre-war ==
Drabiński began his career with Legia Warsaw after joining the youth teams in 1927. He made his debut for Legia in 1933, before joining Warszawianka in 1938.

== World War II ==
The outbreak of World War II in 1939 stopped his footballing career, and Drabiński was involved in the September Campaign. Drabiński's unit was captured by the Soviet forces in Kozielsk, and was spared exaction due to not being a Polish Army Officer. He was later involved in a prisoner exchange with the German forces and was sent to an Oflag camp. Drabiński later escaped from the camp and met up with Polish General Stanisław Sosabowski with whom he fought. Eventually he ended up in the United Kingdom where he later trained as a Cichociemni. During this time he played for Dundee United and Dunfermline Athletic in Scotland. Drabiński was awarded with the Virtuti Militari medal for his service in the war.

== Football post-war ==
After the war, Drabiński moved back to Poland and joined his old club Legia Warsaw. Drabiński is the only player to have played for Legia both before and after World War II. He only made 4 more appearances for Legia, and retired from professional football in 1948, quickly becoming the Legia manager. Drabiński went on to manage other top division sides such as ŁKS Łódź, Polonia Bydgoszcz, Polonia Bytom, and Lechia Gdańsk, before winning his only competition as a manager with Gwardia Warsaw in 1967 winning the II liga to get Gwardia promoted to the top division.

== Honours ==
Polonia Bytom

- Ekstraklasa runner-up: 1961

Gwardia Warsaw

- II liga: 1966–67

== Military awards ==
- Virtuti Militari
