= Ryszard Koncewicz =

Polish footballer and coach

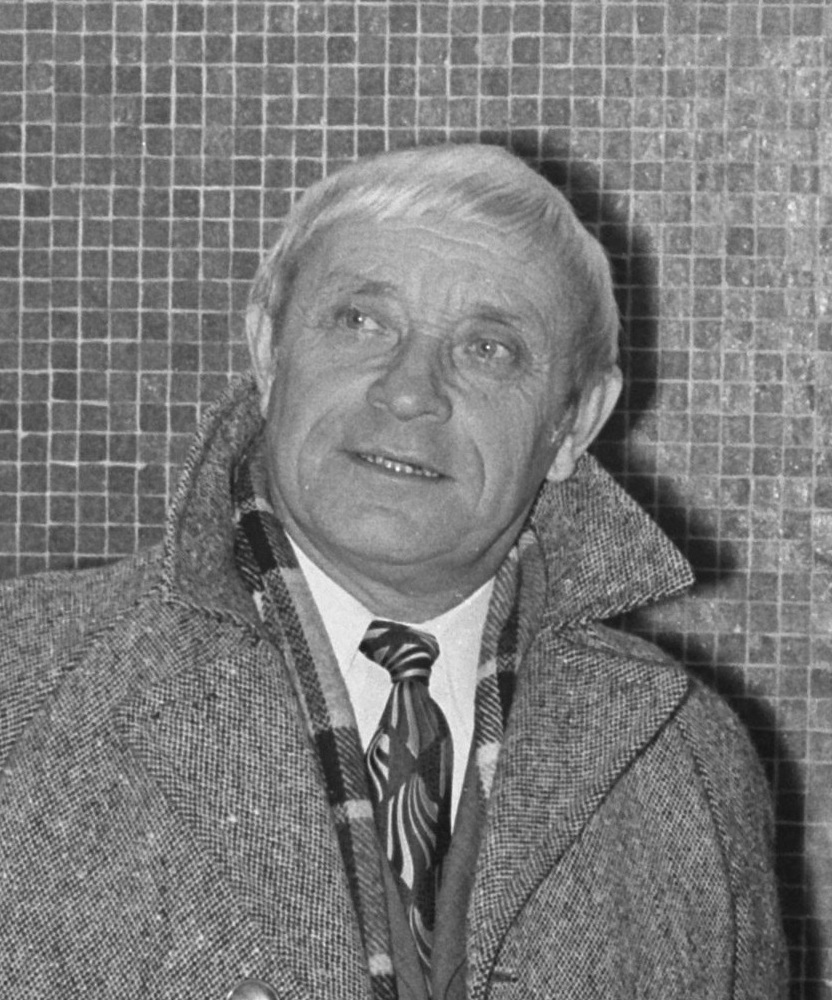
- Ryszard Koncewicz in 1974

Personal information
- Full name: Ryszard Tadeusz Koncewicz
- Date of birth: 12 April 1911
- Place of birth: Lemberg, Austria-Hungary
- Date of death: 15 March 2001 (aged 89)
- Place of death: Warsaw, Poland
- Position: Striker

Senior career*
Years	Team	Apps	(Gls)
1927–1939	Lechia Lwów		
1945–1946	Polonia Bytom		

Managerial career
- 1949: Lechia Gdańsk
- 1950–1952: Ruch Chorzów
- 1952–1955: Polonia Bytom
- 1956–1958: Legia Warsaw
- 1968–1970: Poland
- 1975: Gwardia Warsaw
- * Club domestic league appearances and goals

Ryszard Tadeusz Koncewicz (12 April 1911 – 15 March 2001) was a Polish footballer and manager. In the interbellum period, Koncewicz played without notable successes for Lechia Lwów (1927–1939). Caught by the Wehrmacht during the Polish September Campaign, he spent the war in a German POW camp Oflag IIC Woldenberg, where he represented the unofficial team of the city of Lwów, which consisted of POWs.

After the war he returned to Poland, and as Lwów was annexed by the Soviet Union, Koncewicz, together with numerous Poles expelled from the city, settled in Bytom, where he played for Polonia Bytom. In 1950, he became a coach of Ruch Chorzów, winning next year the Cup of Poland. Then he coached Polonia Bytom (1954 champions), Legia Warsaw (1956 champions and winners of Cup of Poland) and Gwardia Warsaw.

As early as 1948, Koncewicz started cooperating with then-coach of the Poland national team, Wacław Kuchar, who himself was from Lwów as well. Then, he trained Poland for several short periods (1953, 1956–1957, 1964–1966 and 1968–1970). After retiring, he was an activist of the Polish Football Association (PZPN).

== Honours ==
=== Manager ===
Ruch Chorzów

- Polish Football Championship: 1951
- Polish Cup: 1950–51

Polonia Bytom

- Ekstraklasa: 1954

Legia Warsaw

- Ekstraklasa: 1956
- Polish Cup: 1955–56
