= Wojciech Łazarek =

Polish footballer and manager (1937–2023)

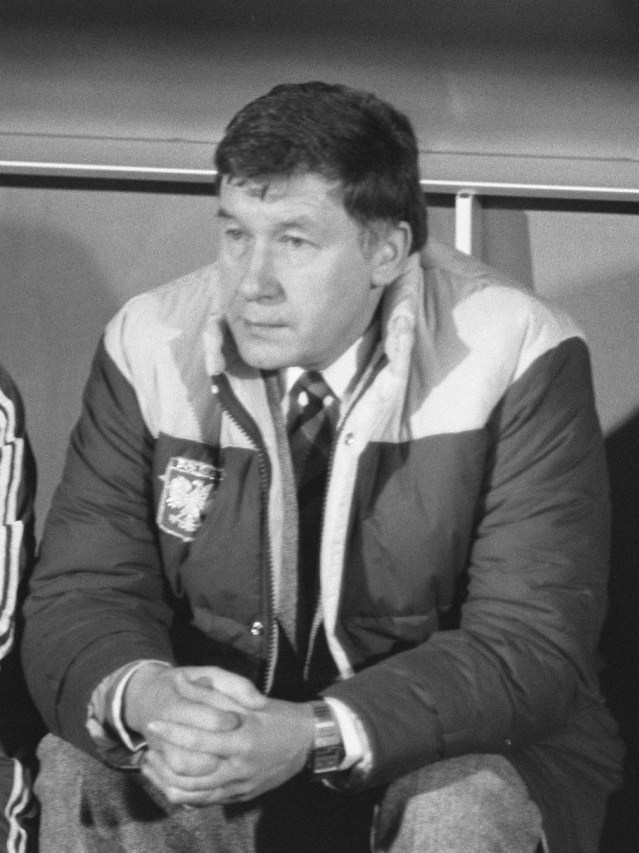
- Łazarek in 1986

Personal information
- Date of birth: 4 October 1937
- Place of birth: Łódź, Poland
- Date of death: 13 December 2023 (aged 86)
- Height: 1.77 m (5 ft 10 in)
- Position: Forward

Youth career
- 1952–1955: Metalowiec Łódź

Senior career*
Years	Team	Apps	(Gls)
1956–1961	Start Łódź		
1961	ŁKS Łódź	9	(1)
1962–1966	Start Łódź		
1967–1971	Lechia Gdańsk	35	(16)

Managerial career
- 1971–1974: MRKS Gdańsk
- 1974–1975: Lechia Gdańsk
- 1975–1976: Olimpia Elbląg
- 1977: Bałtyk Gdynia
- 1978–1979: Zawisza Bydgoszcz
- 1980–1984: Lech Poznań
- 1984–1986: Lechia Gdańsk
- 1986: Trelleborgs FF
- 1986–1989: Poland
- 1990: Hapoel Kfar Saba
- 1991: ŁKS Łódź
- 1992: El-Masry
- 1993–1994: Al-Ettifaq
- 1995: Aluminium Konin
- 1996–1997: Hapoel Tayibe
- 1997–1998: Wisła Kraków
- 1998: Widzew Łódź
- 1998–1999: Śląsk Wrocław
- 2000: Wisła Kraków
- 2001–2002: Jagiellonia Białystok
- 2002–2004: Sudan
- 2005–2006: Narew Ostrołęka
- 2008: Iłanka Rzepin
- * Club domestic league appearances and goals

Wojciech Łazarek (4 October 1937 – 13 December 2023) was a Polish football manager and player who played as forward. He was the manager of the Poland national team from 1986 to 1989, and the Sudan national team in early 2000s. At club level he was most noted for success in 80s as manager of Lech Poznań, although he also managed clubs in the Middle East and a wide range of clubs in Poland at various levels.

== Playing career ==
A native of Łódź, during his playing career Łazarek represented Start Łódź, ŁKS Łódź, and Lechia Gdańsk.

== Managerial career ==
Łazarek started his managerial career soon after retirement as a player in 1971, starting at MRKS Gdańsk. He went on to manage Lechia Gdańsk, Olimpia Elbląg, Bałtyk Gdynia, Zawisza Bydgoszcz, Lech Poznań, Trelleborgs FF, Poland, Hapoel Kfar Saba, ŁKS Łódź, El-Masry, Al-Ettifaq, Aluminium Konin, Hapoel Tayibe, Wisła Kraków, Widzew Łódź, Śląsk Wrocław, Jagiellonia Białystok, the Sudan national team,Narew Ostrołęka and Iłanka Rzepin.

Łazarek led Poland to win 18 out of 31 matches between 1986 and 1989.

His greatest club success came with Lech Poznań; he won 2 Polish Cups and 2 championships.

== Death and legacy ==
Łazarek died on 13 December 2023, at the age of 86.

Łazarek was known for his comedic quips and ability to realistically view his job.

== Honours ==
=== Manager ===
Zawisza Bydgoszcz

- II liga, group I: 1978–79

Lech Poznań

- Ekstraklasa: 1982–83, 1983–84
- Polish Cup: 1981–82, 1983–84

Individual

- Polish Coach of the Year: 1983, 1984
