= Jerzy Brzyski =

Polish association football manager

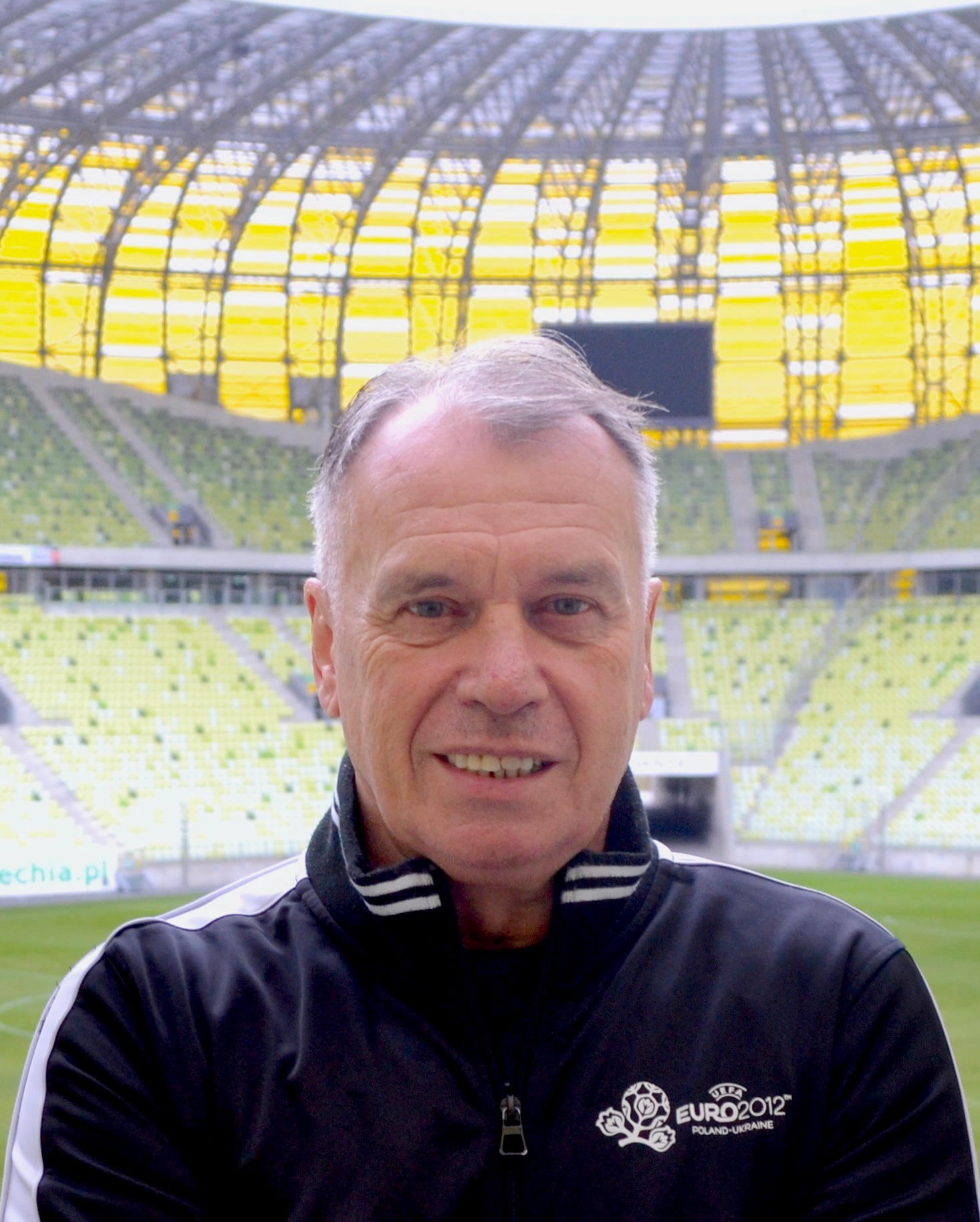

Personal information
- Full name: Jerzy Brzyski
- Date of birth: 7 January 1949
- Place of birth: Lublin, Poland

Managerial career
- Years: Team
- 1981: Lechia Gdańsk
- 1996–97: Motor Lublin

Dr. Jerzy Brzyski (born 7 January 1949) is a Polish doctor of physical sciences, football coach, and former football manager.

== Education ==
Brzyski graduated from the Gdańsk University of Physical Education and Sport before studying at Józef Piłsudski University of Physical Education in Warsaw. Brzyski received his doctorate of Physical Sciences at AFW Kraków. He has achieved his Coaching Licence from the Polish Football Association.

== Football ==
=== Senior coaching ===
Brzyski was the manager of Lechia Gdańsk in 1981 with the team finishing 7th in the league. He was the manager of Motor Lublin for the 1996-97 season. Brzyski also managed MRKS Gdańsk, Lewart Lubartów and Sygnał Lublin.

=== Youth coaching ===
During his coaching of youth teams Berzyski has achieved the following;

1. 1st place W. Kuchara Cup - U14's (1989)
2. 1st place J. Michałowicz Cup - U15's (1990)
3. 2nd place Polish Junior Championships - U18's (1993)
4. 2nd place K. Deyny Cup - U16's (2002)
5. 1st place M. Listkiewicz Cup - U12's (2006)
6. 2nd place K. Górski Cup - U13's (2007)
7. 1st place Norwich Cup - Lechia Gdańsk
8. 1st place Klagenfurt Cup - Lechia Gdańsk

== Teaching, academy and publications ==
Berzyski has previously had roles as a teacher working in four different schools in the city of Gdańsk. He has also founded his own football academy in Gdańsk. Berzyski has led lectures on National Sport Training for SWPW in Płock. He has released professional and scientific publications which are related to football.
