= Jerzy Wrzos =

Polish association football manager

Personal information
- Full name: Jerzy Wrzos
- Date of birth: 18 November 1936 (age 89)
- Place of birth: Chełm, Poland

Managerial career
- Years: Team
- 1964–1966: Lechia Gdańsk
- 1966–1967: Raków Częstochowa
- 1969–1971: Piast Gliwice

Dr. Jerzy Wrzos (born 18 November 1936) is a Polish retired football manager, author, teacher, sport theoretician, and doctor of physical education specialising in football.

== Biography ==
Wrzos was born in Chełm, Poland, on 18 November 1936. In 1962 he graduated from Academy of Physical Education in Wrocław, achieving a Magister degree. In the early 60's Wrzos wrote in many football related magazines, such as; Piłka Nożna (football), Trener (trainer/manager), Soccer America, chicagowskiej Polonii (Chicago Polonia) as well as the articles featuring in other publications, and was one of the first people to discover and write about the talents of Kazimierz Deyna. In 1962 he became a manager training with smaller football teams, before getting his first big job moving to manage Lechia Gdańsk in December 1964. His role at Lechia saw him managing in the II liga, finishing mid-table for both of the seasons he was there. He is currently the youngest ever manager of Lechia Gdańsk, becoming the manager at just over the age of 28 years old. In 1966 he moved to Raków Częstochowa for a season, helping the team to a 4th-place finish, before unexpectedly leaving the job at the end of the season through unexplained circumstances. His last role in football management came during 1969–71 when he managed Piast Gliwice, during which time he won the III liga (group I) for the 1969–70 season. After club management Wrzos started working at the (AWF Katowice) Academy of Physical Education in Katowice, during which he taught post-graduate, extramural, and full-time classes for football managers and those wishing to become trainers or managers from the years 1973–82. In 1980 he was at AWF Poznań (Eugeniusz Piasecki Academy of Physical Education in Poznan) and became one of the first football managers to receive a doctorate, with his thesis on the subject of training in world football. While employed with AWF Katowice he was the author of over 100 articles and books on the history of football management and the methods of training, which were published in Poland and abroad. His book Wielki futbol (2006) was the first Polish football publication to be recommended by FIFA.

== Honours ==
Piast Gliwice

- III liga (group I)
  - Winners: 1969–70

== Publications ==
- Atlas Specjalistycznych Ćwiczeń Piłkarza (1980) Atlas of Specialist Ball Player Practice
- Atlas des Exercices Specifiques du Footbaleur (1980, 1982) Atlas of Footballers Specific Exercises
- Football. La tactique de l`attaque (1984) Football. The tactics of the attack
- Soccer – the International Training Guide (1992, 1996) with – Sepp Blatter, foreword
- Wielki futbol (2006) Great football
- Polska droga do Euro 2008... 2012 (2008) The Polish road to Euro 2008... 2012 with – Antoni Piechniczek
