= Arka Gdynia =

Polish football club

Coordinates: 54°29′35.29″N 18°31′52.37″E

- Full name: Morski Związkowy Klub Sportowy Arka Gdynia
- Nicknames: Śledzie (The Herrings); Żółto-Niebiescy (The Yellow and Blues)
- Founded: 1929; 97 years ago, as Klub Sportowy Gdynia
- Ground: Stadion GOSiR
- Capacity: 15,139
- Chairman: Wojciech Pertkiewicz
- Manager: Tomasz Grzegorczyk
- League: I liga
- 2025–26: Ekstraklasa, 17th of 18 (relegated)
- Website: www.arka.gdynia.pl
Home colours	Away colours	Third colours

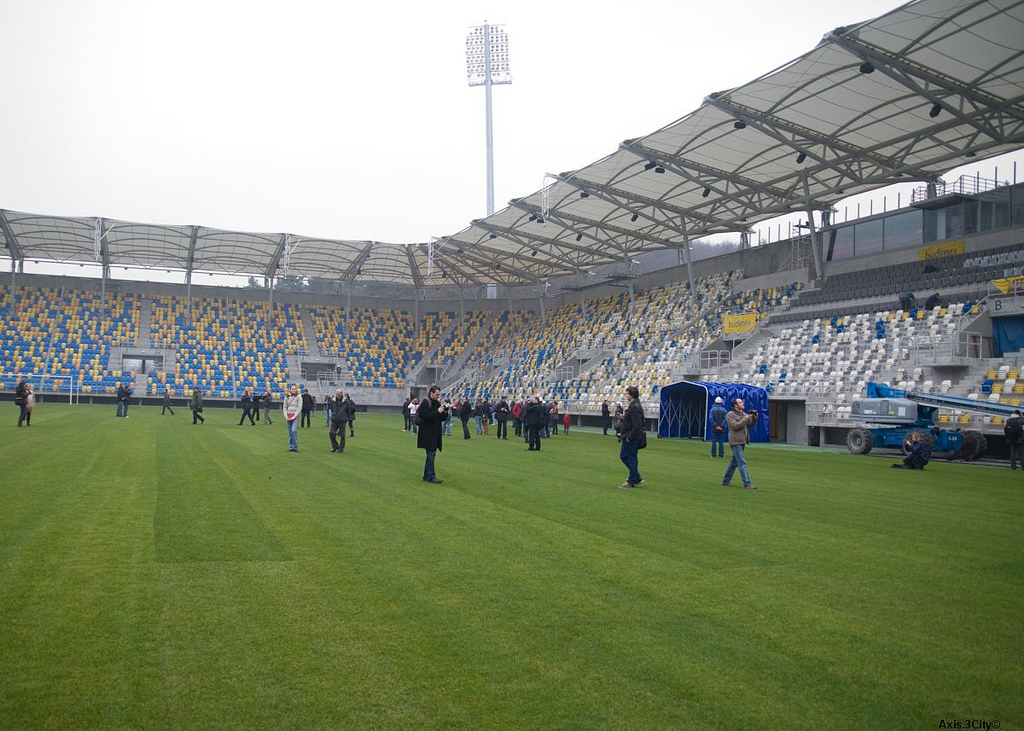
Stadion GOSiR

Morski Związkowy Klub Sportowy Arka Gdynia (lit. 'Maritime Union Sports Club Arka Gdynia', Polish pronunciation: [ˈmɔrskʲi zvjɔ̃sˈkɔvɨ ˈklup spɔrˈtɔvɨ ˈarka ˈɡdɨɲa]) is a professional football club based in Gdynia, Poland The club was founded as Klub Sportowy Gdynia in 1929. They will play in the I liga in the 2026–27 season following relegation in the previous season.

== History ==
The history of Arka dates back to 1929, when a group of workers of the Port of Gdynia founded Klub Sportowy (Sports Club) Gdynia (abbreviated KS Gdynia). In 1932, a new stadium of KS was opened at Polanka Redłowska. This location was used by the club until 2000. In 1934, Klub Sportowy Kotwica (Sports Club Anchor) was registered. Both team existed until 1939.

In 1949, Rybacki Klub Sportowy ("Fishermen Sports Club") MIR was formed. Three years later, its name was changed to Klub Sportowy Kolejarz-Arka Gdynia. In 1953, the team for the first time won promotion to the third level of Polish football. In 1959, Arka's U-19 became Polish runner-up, and in 1960, after a dramatic game vs. Hutnik Kraków, Arka won promotion to the Second Division.

In 1964, Arka merged with Doker Gdynia, to form Morski Związkowy Klub Sportowy (MZKS; "Maritime United Sports Club") Gdynia. In 1972, its name was changed into Arka. Two years later Arka won promotion to the Ekstraklasa. Relegated after one year, Arka returned to the top level in 1976. In 1979 Arka, managed by Czesław Boguszewicz, became the first team from Polish Baltic Sea coast to win the Polish Cup. In the final game, which took place in Lublin, Arka beat Wisła Kraków 2–1. In its UEFA Cup Winners' Cup debut, Arka lost to Bulgarian side PFC Beroe Stara Zagora (3–2, 0–2).

In 1982, Arka was relegated from the top level, to return there in 2005. In the 1982 World Cup in Spain, Arka's Janusz Kupcewicz was among top players of Polish national team, which won bronze medal.

In the 1980s and 1990s, Arka played either in the third or second division, with a number of promotions and relegations. In 2001, after six years in the third level, Arka again won promotion to the second division, and in 2005, the team returned to Ekstraklasa.

In 2011, the City of Gdynia completed the construction of a new stadium, located on Olimpijska Street. On 19 February 2011, Arka tied 1–1 with Beroe Stara Zagora in a friendly game to commemorate the opening of their new venue. That year, Arka were relegated from the top level.

In 2016, Arka was promoted to the top level again after taking first place in the I liga. Soon after getting promoted, Arka won the Polish Cup for the second time, and the Polish Super Cup twice: in 2017 and 2018.

== Honours ==
- I liga
  - Champions: 2015–16, 2024–25
- Polish Cup
  - Winners: 1978–79, 2016–17
  - Runners-up: 2017–18, 2020–21
- Polish Super Cup
  - Winners: 2017, 2018
- Youth teams
  - Polish U-19 Championship
    - Champions: 2012
    - Runners-up: 1956, 2013
    - Third place: 2009
  - Polish U-17 Championship
    - Runners-up: 2010

== League participation ==
By tier:

- Ekstraklasa: 1974–75, 1976–82, 2005–07, 2008–11, 2016–20, 2025–26
- I liga: 1961–62 (2 seasons), 1964–68, 1969–74, 1975–76, 1982–84, 1985–87, 1988–89, 1992–95, 2001–05, 2007–08, 2011–16, 2020–25, 2026–
- II liga: 1954–60 (7 seasons), 1962–64, 1968–69, 1984–85, 1987–88, 1989–92, 1995–2001

== Fans ==
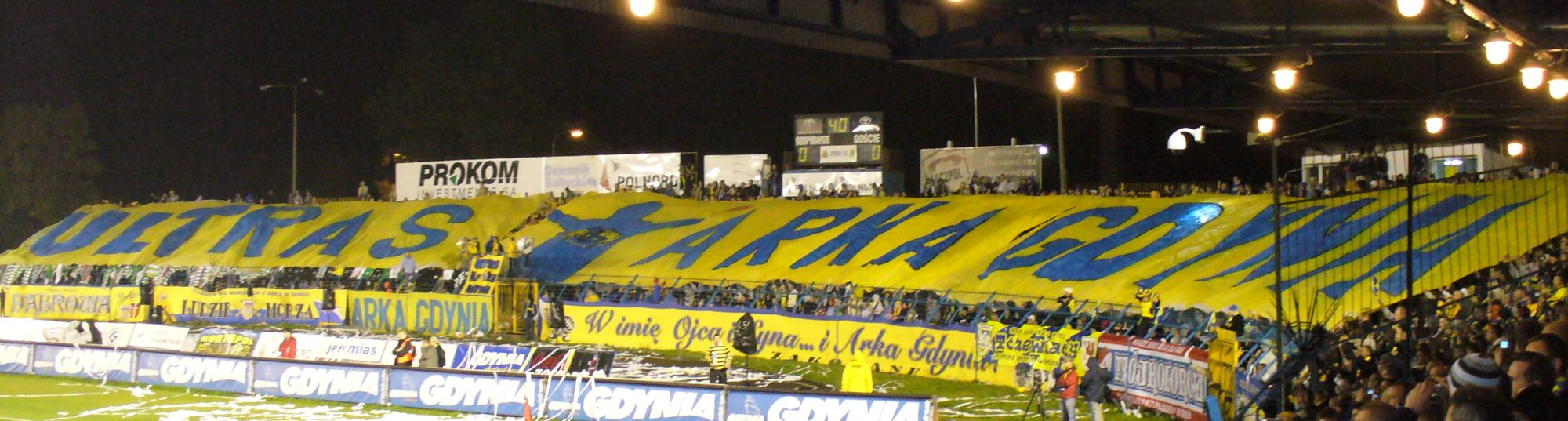
Ultras

Arka is one of the most supported clubs in Poland, drawing in support from mostly across Pomerania. Outside the Tricity, Arka has fan-clubs in all major cities and towns in the region, such as Tczew, Wejherowo, Braniewo and Kościerzyna for example, as well as fan-clubs in places further away such as Zakopane and Lublin Voivodeship, and even two fan-clubs in Germany set up by expatriate Arka fans, in Oberhausen and Stuttgart.

The fans have an alliance with fans of Cracovia and Lech Poznań, and the three are known as "The Great Triad" (Wielka Triada). Formerly, fans of Lechia Gdańsk, Śląsk Wrocław and Wisła Kraków also shared a friendship called "The Three Kings of Big Cities" (Trzej Królowie Wielkich Miast) and any match between the two alliances was considered a big rivalry. The alliance was dissolved in 2016, with Wisła Kraków turning hostile to Lechia Gdańsk and Śląsk Wrocław, and the fans of Wisła founding another alliance with Widzew Łódź, Ruch Chorzów and Elana Toruń, called WRWE, after the initials of its members. The only members who still are friends are Lechia Gdańsk and Śląsk Wrocław.

Arka fans maintain alliances with several other fans aside from Cracovia and Lech, many of them lasting now for decades: fans of Zagłębie Lubin (since 1983), Gwardia Koszalin (since 1989), and KSZO Ostrowiec Świętokrzyski (since 2004) are all considered good friends. The friendship with Polonia Bytom fans dates back to 1974, and is one of the longest friendships in supporter history which has survived to date.

The greatest rival or Arka is Lechia Gdańsk, a team with whom they contest the so-called Tricity Derby or Pomeranian Derby. Fans of both teams remain venomously hostile and since the early 1970s the history of games between Arka and Lechia is marked by riots and violence. Relations with another Gdynia football team Bałtyk Gdynia used to be friendly until the 1980s, when they turned hostile. Due to Bałtyk's successive relegations and their declining numbers of fans this rivalry is now of lesser importance.

== Players ==
=== Current squad ===
As of 28 August 2026

Note: Flags indicate national team as defined under FIFA eligibility rules; some limited exceptions apply. Players may hold more than one non-FIFA nationality.

No.	Pos.	Nation	Player
3	DF	POL	Serafin Szota
4	DF	GER	Marco Komenda
6	DF	POL	Kasjan Lipkowski
8	MF	CIV	Alassane Sidibe
9	FW	LAT	Vladislavs Gutkovskis (captain)
10	MF	JPN	Hide Vitalucci
11	MF	POL	Dawid Kocyła
14	MF	POL	Dominik Kun
16	MF	POL	Kuba Solecki
17	MF	POL	Natan Dzięgielewski (on loan from Górnik Zabrze)
19	MF	POL	Bartłomiej Pawłowski
20	DF	POL	Konrad Gruszkowski
22	MF	POL	Michał Rzuchowski
23	MF	POL	Szymon Lewkot
27	MF	POL	Maksymilian Sznaucner

No.	Pos.	Nation	Player
28	MF	POL	Maciej Ambrosiewicz
30	GK	POL	Kacper Krzepisz
31	MF	POL	Jakub Staniszewski
33	GK	POL	Jędrzej Grobelny
39	MF	POL	Michał Milewski
44	DF	ESP	Javi Domínguez
71	MF	POL	Jakub Kowalski (on loan from Korona Kielce)
72	MF	SLO	Elian Demirović
77	MF	POL	Filip Waluś
80	DF	POL	Wojciech Zacharewicz
90	MF	POL	Piotr Krefft
94	DF	POL	Dawid Gojny
98	FW	ALB	Elmedin Rama
99	GK	POL	Dawid Arndt

=== Out on loan ===
Note: Flags indicate national team as defined under FIFA eligibility rules; some limited exceptions apply. Players may hold more than one non-FIFA nationality.

No.	Pos.	Nation	Player
12	GK	POL	Paweł Depka (at Gryf Wejherowo until 30 June 2027)
34	MF	POL	Hubert Strugała (at Mławianka Mława until 30 June 2027)

=== Retired numbers ===
Note: Flags indicate national team as defined under FIFA eligibility rules; some limited exceptions apply. Players may hold more than one non-FIFA nationality.

No.	Pos.	Nation	Player
5	DF	POL	Zbigniew Bieliński (1966–81 – posthumous honour)

== Managers ==
- (Austria) Ferdinand Fritsch (1950)
- (Poland) Herman May (1953)
- (Poland) Czesław Bartolik (1954–1955)
- (Poland) Tadeusz Foryś (1956)
- (Poland) Jan Gazur (1957–1958)
- (Poland) Edward Kołpa (1959)
- (Poland) Roman Sawecki (1960)
- (Poland) Henryk Serafin (1961)
- (Poland) Piotr Nierychło (1962)
- (Poland) Stanisław Malon (1962–1963)
- (Poland) Józef Barbachen (1963–1964)
- (Poland) Edward Brzozowski (1964–1965)
- (Poland) Grzegorz Polakow (1965–1971)
- (Poland) Jerzy Słaboszowski (1971–1975)
- (Poland) Stefan Żywotko (1975–1976)
- (Poland) Konrad Araucz (1976–1977)
- (Poland) Janusz Pekowski (1977)
- (Poland) Jerzy Steckiw (1977–1979)
- (Poland) Czesław Boguszewicz (1979–1980)
- (Poland) Stanisław Stachura (1980–1981)
- (Poland) Grzegorz Polakow (1981-198x)
- (Poland) Zbigniew Strzelecki (198x-198x)
- (Poland) Konrad Araucz (198x-198x)
- (Poland) Zbigniew Strzelecki (198x-198x)
- (Poland) Andrzej Trywiański (198x-198x)
- (Poland) Janusz Inżyński (198x-198x)
- (Poland) Adam Adamus (198x-198x)
- (Poland) Krzysztof Szkoda (198x-198x)
- (Poland) Andrzej Bikiewicz (198x-1987)
- (Poland) Jerzy Jastrzębowski (1987–1989)
- (Poland) Andrzej Bikiewicz (1989-19xx)
- (Poland) Mieczysław Rajski (19xx-1991)
- (Poland) Jacek Dziubiński (1991–1993)
- (Poland) Ryszard Lipiński (1993)
- (Poland) Stanisław Stachura (1993)
- (Poland) Jacek Dziubiński ()
- (Poland) Grzegorz Witt (1994–1995)
- (Poland) Grzegorz Polakow (1994–1995)
- (Poland) Grzegorz Witt (1994–1995)
- (Poland) Jacek Dziubiński ()
- (Poland) Marian Geszke (1995)
- (Poland) Ryszard Lipiński (1995–1996)
- (Poland) Jacek Dziubiński (1995–1996)
- (Poland) Jarosław Kotas (1996–1997)
- (Poland) Andrzej Bussler (1996–1998)
- (Poland) Jacek Dziubiński (1998–1999)
- (Poland) Wojciech Niedźwiedzki (1998–1999)
- (Poland) Stanisław Stachura (1999–2000)
- (Poland) Mieczysław Gierszewski (2000–2001)
- (Poland) Wiesław Pisarski (2001)
- (Poland) Marek Kusto (2001–2003)
- (Poland) Mieczysław Rajski (2003–2004)
- (Poland) Piotr Mandrysz (2003–2004)
- (Poland) Wojciech Wąsikiewicz (2003–2004)
- (Poland) Mirosław Dragan (2004–2005)
- (Poland) Wojciech Wąsikiewicz (2005–2006)
- (Poland) Zbigniew Kaczmarek (2006)
- (Poland) Wojciech Stawowy (2006–2007)
- (Poland) Robert Jończyk (2007–2008)
- (Poland) Czesław Michniewicz (2008–2009)
- (Poland) Marek Chojnacki (2009)
- (Poland) Dariusz Pasieka (2009–2011)
- (Czech Republic) František Straka (2011)
- (Czech Republic) Petr Němec (2011–2012)
- (Poland) Paweł Sikora (2012–2014)
- (Poland) Piotr Rzepka (2014)
- (Poland) Dariusz Dźwigała (2014)
- (Poland) Grzegorz Niciński (2014–2017)
- (Poland) Leszek Ojrzyński (2017–2018)
- (Poland) Zbigniew Smółka (2018–2019)
- (Poland) Jacek Zieliński (2019)
- (Serbia) Aleksandar Rogić (2019–2020)
- (Poland) Krzysztof Sobieraj (2020)
- (Poland) Ireneusz Mamrot (2020)
- (Poland) Dariusz Marzec (2020–2021)
- (Poland) Ryszard Tarasiewicz (2021–2022)
- (Brazil) Hermes (2022–2023)
- (Poland) Ryszard Wieczorek (2023)
- (Poland) Wojciech Łobodziński (2023–2024)
- (Poland) Tomasz Grzegorczyk (interim) (2024)
- (Poland) Dawid Szwarga (2024–2026)
- (Poland) Dariusz Banasik (2026)
- (Czech Republic) Marek Jarolím (2026)
- (Poland) Tomasz Grzegorczyk (2026–present)

== Arka in Europe ==
Season	Competition	Round	Opponent	Home	Away	Aggregate
1979–80	UEFA Cup Winners' Cup	1R	(Bulgaria) Beroe Stara Zagora	3–2	0–2	3–4
2017–18	UEFA Europa League	3Q	(Denmark) Midtjylland	3–2	1–2	4–4 (a)

== See also ==
- Football in Poland
