= Bałtyk Gdynia =

Polish football club

- Full name: Stowarzyszenie Klub Sportowy; Bałtyk Gdynia
- Nickname: Kadłuby (The Hulls)
- Founded: 1930; 96 years ago
- Ground: National Rugby Stadium
- Capacity: 2,425
- Chairman: Andrzej Adamczyk
- Manager: Jakub Izdebski
- League: Regional league Gdańsk I
- 2024–25: IV liga Pomerania, 14th of 18 (relegated)
- Website: baltykgdynia.pl
Home colours	Away colours

Bałtyk Gdynia is a Polish football club from Gdynia. The club is named after the Baltic Sea. They currently compete in the regional league, the sixth tier of Polish league competition.

== History ==
The club was established in 1930 by football enthusiasts from the developing city. Bałtyk is the oldest football club from Gdynia, which still plays with its original name.

Bałtyk played seven seasons in the Polish first league and 19 in Polish second league. They also appeared once in the Intertoto Cup, in 1983. In 1977, Baltyk's U-19 team won bronze in the Polish Championship, and in 1982, Baltyk won silver in the U-19 championship of Poland.

In 2019 and 2020, the club fell victim to a career fraudster causing the club to sign player contracts promising money that did not exist. The perpetrator was never caught however the club managed to negotiate a recovery plan and by 2021 the club was solvent again.

== Fans ==
The fans are known as "Kadłuby" (The Hulls). Once one of the strongest fan groups in the 80's, as the team started to fall down the leagues only a handful of loyal supporters now remain in Gdynia and several smaller towns in the region.

In the past the fast used to have short-lived friendly relations with fans of Lech Poznań, Pogoń Lębork and Ferencváros at various points in their history. Currently they have good relations with fans of Kotwica Kołobrzeg and Cartusia Kartuzy.

The two Tricity derby rivals Lechia Gdańsk and Arka Gdynia are considered the most fierce. The games against Arka, also known as the Gdynia derby have a long history and the fans often contend for dominance in the city. The controversy surrounding the two club's stadium use is also a serious cause of tension between the two.

Due to Bałtyk languishing in the lower leagues for several years, the club has developed rivalries with other clubs, mainly Gryf Słupsk.

== Bałtyk in Europe ==
Season	Competition	Round		Club	Score
1983	Intertoto Cup	GR	(Denmark)	Boldklubben 1903	1–1, 2–1
			(Sweden)	IFK Göteborg	0–3, 0–0
			(Austria)	Admira Wacker Mödling	3–1, 2–3

== Current squad ==
As of 10 March 2025.

Note: Flags indicate national team as defined under FIFA eligibility rules; some limited exceptions apply. Players may hold more than one non-FIFA nationality.

No.	Pos.	Nation	Player
—	GK	POL	Filip Kondracik
—	GK	POL	Szymon Stanik
—	GK	POL	Dawid Szymański
—	DF	POL	Dawid Blok
—	DF	UKR	Maksym Demyanchuk
—	DF	POL	Aleksander Drozdowicz
—	DF	POL	Maciej Kaźmierczak
—	DF	POL	Wiktor Patrzykąt
—	DF	POL	Dominik Pluta
—	DF	POL	Kamil Witkowski
—	DF	POL	Dawid Zabielski
—	MF	POL	Marcel Brodnicki
—	MF	POL	Mateusz Długołęcki
—	MF	POL	Michał Dmochowski
—	MF	POL	Kamil Formella
—	MF	POL	Oliwier Hewelt
—	MF	POL	Piotr Kaliszewski

No.	Pos.	Nation	Player
—	MF	POL	Mikołaj Kośnik
—	MF	POL	Mateusz Krause
—	MF	POL	Bartłomiej Kurzyński
—	MF	POL	Bartosz Lupa
—	MF	POL	Rafał Malanowski
—	MF	POL	Igor Michalski
—	MF	POL	Bartosz Ossowski
—	MF	POL	Kornel Przyborowski
—	MF	POL	Michał Sadowski
—	MF	POL	Rafał Szybajło
—	MF	POL	Dawid Werner
—	MF	POL	Kasper Własny
—	FW	POL	Igor Jankowski
—	FW	POL	Artur Radomski
—	FW	POL	Marcin Szulc
—	FW	POL	Kamil Święciński

== Former players ==
- (United States) Lawrence Papaleo
