= Maciej Chorążyk =

Polish freelance sports journalist

Maciej Chorążyk (born 2 August 1974 in Krynica) is a Polish freelance sports journalist and soccer official, main coordinator/chief scout of the Polish Football Association's Scouting and Monitoring Polish Youth Abroad Section. He is a graduate of the journalism and sociology departments at the University of Opole, also with a sports-manager degree of the Jagiellonian University. The Scouting section of PZPN led by Chorążyk, with representatives across Western Europe and the Americas, seeks young talented footballers of Polish origin living abroad, potential candidates for the Polish national football teams.

== Highlights ==
Among the renowned players with whom Chorążyk negotiated playing for Poland, are Sebastian Tyrala, and Ludovic Obraniak, with the latter one's case already settled. Chorazyk, due to his activities, has been called a poacher by a German sports magazine Kicker. The section managed by him has branches across western and northern Europe, as well as in the United States, Canada, and Brazil. Stefan Szczeplek, one of the most renowned Polish sports journalists, wrote in Rzeczpospolita daily that had it not been for Chorazyk's passion, Obraniak would never play for Poland.

In an interview given to a football portal www.sportowefakty.pl, Chorazyk stated that in January 2007 he discussed creation of the Scouting and Monitoring Polish Youth Abroad Section with PZPN's Jerzy Engel. Soon afterwards, he presented his idea of the section, which was accepted by the Association. Main activities of his office are concentrated in Germany, where up to 90% of prospective players of Polish origin are found, almost all of them being sons of Polish immigrants, who left their homeland in the 1980s. In his opinion, the section's biggest failure was the loss of Sebastian Boenisch, who had expressed interest in his capping for Poland, but management of the national team was not interested. On August 12, 2009, Chorazyk admitted that he had been negotiating with two Polish - French football stars, Damien Perquis of FC Sochaux, and Laurent Koscielny of FC Lorient. “We are now handling passport-related issues, and we will know more in the near future” - he said.
