= Edward Brzozowski =

Polish footballer and coach (1920–1983)

Personal information
- Full name: Edward Jan Brzozowski
- Date of birth: 11 October 1920
- Place of birth: Warsaw, Poland
- Date of death: 25 June 1983 (aged 62)
- Place of death: Warsaw, Poland
- Position: Defender

Senior career*
Years	Team	Apps	(Gls)
1939–1951	Polonia Warsaw		

International career
1947–1951	Poland	6	(0)

Managerial career
- 1949–1950: Polonia Warsaw
- 1953–1956: Gwardia Warsaw
- 1958: Arkonia Szczecin
- 1959: Pogoń Szczecin
- 1960: Polonia Warsaw
- 1960–1961: Pogoń Szczecin
- 1961: Polonia Bytom
- 1962: Odra Opole
- 1963–1964: Zawisza Bydgoszcz
- 1964–1965: Arka Gdynia
- 1965–1966: Hutnik Warsaw
- 1966: Lech Poznań
- 1967: Lechia Gdańsk
- 1968–1971: Polonia Warsaw
- 1972–1973: Hutnik Warsaw
- 1974: Polonia Warsaw
- * Club domestic league appearances and goals

Edward Jan Brzozowski (11 October 1920 – 25 June 1983) was a Polish footballer and manager.

== Career ==
=== Playing career ===
Brzozowski played for Polonia Warsaw and gained 6 caps for Poland.

=== Coaching career ===
Brzozowski managed Polonia Warsaw, Pogoń Szczecin, Odra Opole, Zawisza Bydgoszcz, Arka Gdynia, Hutnik Warsaw and Lech Poznań.

== Honours ==
=== Player ===
Polonia Warsaw

- Ekstraklasa: 1946

=== Manager ===
Gwardia Warsaw

- Polish Cup: 1953–54
