= Adeniyi Agbejule =

Nigerian association football player

Personal information
- Date of birth: 15 December 1981 (age 44)
- Place of birth: Ebute Metta, Nigeria
- Position: Forward

Senior career*
| Years | Team | Apps | (Gls) |
| 1998 | Fablok Chrzanów | | |
| 1998 | Okęcie Warsaw | | |
| 1999 | Alit Ożarów | | |
| 1999 | Świt Nowy Dwór Mazowiecki | | |
| 2000 | Odra Opole | | |
| 2000–2001 | Hutnik Warsaw | | (19) |
| 2001 | Polonia Warsaw II | | |
| 2001 | Vaasan Palloseura | 5 | (1) |
| 2001–2002 | Hutnik Warsaw | | |
| 2002–2003 | Unia Skierniewice | | |
| 2003–2004 | Znicz Pruszków | | |
| 2007 | Podlasie Chicago | | |
| 2007 | Arka Chicago | | |
- * Club domestic league appearances and goals

Adeniyi Agbejule (born 15 December 1981) is a Nigerian former professional footballer who played as a forward.

== Career ==
=== Finland ===
Acquired by Vaasan Palloseura in 2001, Agbejule landed on September 2, exercising with them and seized his first goal to salvage a point at Haka.

=== Poland ===
Assisting and scoring once as Hutnik Warsaw got past Jagiellonia Białystok 2–0 midway through 2001, Agbejule was assaulted by the opposition's supporters following the game, forcing him to retreat to the locker room. Despite taking the case to the Białystok authorities, they were unable to determine which of the hooligans committed the crime so the search was discontinued, with nobody being prosecuted.
