= Lunds BK =

Swedish football club

- Full name: Lunds Bollklubb
- Nicknames: Krubban (The Manger); Di gule (The Yellow Ones)
- Short name: LBK
- Founded: 1919
- Ground: Klostergårdens IP; Lund; Sweden
- Capacity: 5,000
- Chairman: Håkan Kerrèn
- Manager: Igor Arsenijević
- League: Ettan Södra
- 2025: Ettan Södra, 5th
Home colours	Away colours

Lunds BK is a football club from Lund, Sweden founded in 1919. The club currently plays in Division 1 Södra.

Despite their relative success Lunds BK has never competed in the Allsvenskan or Superettan, but has played nine seasons in the second highest level at that time Division 1. The club is well known for their youth football programme which has produced numerous players such as Martin Dahlin and Roger Ljung who have progressed to major clubs.

== History ==
The team was first formed in 1919 when Lund GIF's youth players rebelled against their coach because they were not getting any playing time. The entire youth squad along with some players from IFK Lund were without club affiliation.

Two youth players, Gustav 'Gast' Persson and Bertil Larsson requested Berndt Paulsson to form the new club. Gunnar Björnhammar became the chairman and the rest of the board consisted of youth players.

In the year that they were formed the team only played one match which they won 4–1 with an attendance of 165 people. Almkvist scored 2 goals and thus became that year's leading scorer.

From 1919 to 1923, the club did not play league football. During this time, the club played 95 matches.

In 1923 Nils Nilsson (Pegen) was the top scorer with 20 goals in 26 matches. In 1924, LBK played 34 matches of which they won 15 games and lost 11.

The next year the club competed in a new league called Sydsvenskan. Since then the club has continued to progress despite the fact that their league position has fluctuated over the years. In recent years the club has mainly competed in the third tier.

The club is affiliated to the Skånes Fotbollförbund.

== Some significant dates in LBK's history: 1920–2010 ==
- 1920: First football exchanges with Malmö FF.
- 1921: First international match was played in Copenhagen.
- 1923: First victory over Lund GIF. Club Eels introduced.
- 1924: The club gets its first female member.
- 1929: A-awaited training plan built on the sports site.
- 1930: Club rooms expanded and equipped for the cold.
- 1941: Youth Football programme is introduced
- 1942: Indoor Football makes premiere in Lund.
- 1947: The team goes up in Division 3. Nils-Åke Sandell as top scorer with 76 goals. Attendance record is increased to 3,234 persons against IFK Värnamo, in Division 3 October 5. It is said that this year was the best football year through all time for LBK.
- 1950: The club hires a full-time coach.
- 1958: An ice hockey division is formed.
- 1960: Ice hockey division is shut down due to lack of interest
- 1972: Women's soccer makes an entrance in the club.
- 1974: The women's league wins the women's division 3.
- 1984: Record attendance increases to 5,201 spectators at Klostergårdens IP, when LBK face IFK Malmö.
- 1985: New attendance record of 5,586, on Thursday, 29 August. Match of the Swedish Cup against Malmö FF (1–6)
- 2005: LBK win against Västra Frölunda IF in the Swedish Cup.
- 2006: LBK P91 finished in 10th place (20 teams) in the Nike Premier Cup (European Championships for club teams)
- 2007: Emil Alriksson prepares Lunds BK's 7000: the objectives. Johan Blomberg wins award as Division 2's best midfielder.

== Season to season ==
Season	Level	Division	Section	Position	Movements
1993	Tier 2	Division 1	Södra	10th	
1994	Tier 2	Division 1	Södra	14th	Relegated
1995	Tier 3	Division 2	Södra Götaland	4th	
1996	Tier 3	Division 2	Södra Götaland	3rd	
1997	Tier 3	Division 2	Södra Götaland	6th	
1998	Tier 3	Division 2	Södra Götaland	9th	
1999	Tier 3	Division 2	Södra Götaland	1st	Promotion playoffs
2000	Tier 3	Division 2	Södra Götaland	4th	
2001	Tier 3	Division 2	Södra Götaland	6th	
2002	Tier 3	Division 2	Södra Götaland	2nd	
2003	Tier 3	Division 2	Södra Götaland	9th	
2004	Tier 3	Division 2	Södra Götaland	6th	
2005	Tier 3	Division 2	Södra Götaland	9th	
2006*	Tier 4	Division 2	Södra Götaland	3rd	
2007	Tier 4	Division 2	Södra Götaland	3rd	
2008	Tier 4	Division 2	Södra Götaland	3rd	
2009	Tier 4	Division 2	Södra Götaland	1st	Promoted
2010	Tier 3	Division 1	Södra	6th	
2011	Tier 3	Division 1	Södra	5th	
2012	Tier 3	Division 1	Södra	2nd	Promotion playoffs
2013	Tier 3	Division 1	Södra	10th	
2014	Tier 3	Division 1	Södra	3rd	
2015	Tier 3	Division 1	Södra	14th	Relegated
2016	Tier 4	Division 2	Södra Götaland	7th	
2017	Tier 4	Division 2	Södra Götaland	2nd	Promoted
2018	Tier 3	Division 1	Södra	7th	
2019	Tier 3	Division 1	Södra	8th	
2020	Tier 3	Division 1	Södra	13th	Relegation playoffs
2021	Tier 3	Division 1	Södra	7th	
2022	Tier 3	Division 1	Södra	9th	
2023	Tier 3	Division 1	Södra	3rd	
2024	Tier 3	Division 1	Södra	2nd	Promotion playoffs
2025	Tier 3	Division 1	Södra	5th	

* League restructuring in 2006 resulted in a new division being created at Tier 3 and subsequent divisions dropping a level.

== Current squad ==
As of 1 September 2026

Note: Flags indicate national team as defined under FIFA eligibility rules; some limited exceptions apply. Players may hold more than one non-FIFA nationality.

No.	Pos.	Nation	Player
1	GK	SWE	Andreas Alexandersson
2	DF	SRB	Božidar Veličković
3	DF	SWE	Ludvig Nicklasson
4	DF	SWE	Hejdar Elwan
6	MF	SWE	Jakob Andersson
7	FW	SWE	Alexander Nilsson
8	MF	SWE	Josef Getachew
10	MF	SWE	Emil Lindman
11	FW	SWE	Amil Mehmedagic
14	MF	SWE	Jonathan Jacobsson
15	DF	SWE	Gustav Båth Sågänger
16	DF	SWE	Dennis Olofsson

No.	Pos.	Nation	Player
17	DF	SWE	Simon Lindfors
18	MF	SWE	Filip Akdemir
19	MF	SWE	Gabriel Tork-Jokar
20	FW	SWE	Aleandro Wihlborg Costa
21	DF	SWE	David Tenggren Kölle
22	DF	FIN	Lucas Karell
24	FW	SWE	Eldon Haxha
25	MF	SWE	Albion Mehmeti
26	DF	SWE	Isak Orajärvi
32	GK	SWE	Ture Fordham
99	FW	GAM	Momodou Bojang

=== Out on loan ===
Note: Flags indicate national team as defined under FIFA eligibility rules; some limited exceptions apply. Players may hold more than one non-FIFA nationality.

No.	Pos.	Nation	Player
6	MF	SWE	Alexander Falk (at Torns IF until 30 November 2026)

== Personnel ==
=== Technical staff ===
Position	Staff
Head coach	(Serbia) Igor Arsenijević
Goalkeeping coach	(Sweden) Isac Litborn
Physiotherapist	(Sweden) August Eriksson
Analyst	(Sweden) Sasha Panah

Last updated: 26 November 2025

=== Management ===
Position	Staff
President	(Sweden) Håkan Kerrén

Last updated: 26 November 2025

=== List of managers ===
- (Austria) Karl Durspekt (1950–1952)
- (Sweden) Börje Tapper (1956–1957)
- (Sweden) Prawitz Öberg (1968–1969)
- (Sweden) Karl-Erik Hult (1983–1985)
- (Sweden) Krister Kristensson (1986–1987)
- (Sweden) Roland Andersson (1988–1990)
- (Sweden) Dan Kanter (2002–2005)
- (Denmark) Jack Majgaard (2006–2009)
- (Sweden) Jonas Eidevall (2009–2011)
- (Sweden) Nils-Erik Persson (2012)
- (Sweden) Leif Engqvist (2013)
- (Sweden) Nils-Erik Persson (2014)
- (Sweden) Georg Eterovic (2015–2016)
- (Sweden) Stefan Jansson (2017–2018)
- (Denmark) Jack Majgaard (2019)
- (Sweden) Anders Grimberg (2020)
- (Sweden) Stefan Jansson (2020–2021)
- (Sweden) Jussi Kontinen (2022–2025)
- (Serbia) Igor Arsenijević (2026–)

== Achievements ==
=== League ===
- Division 1 Södra:
  - Runners-up (2): 2012, 2024
