= Jonas Eidevall =

Swedish association football coach (born 1983)

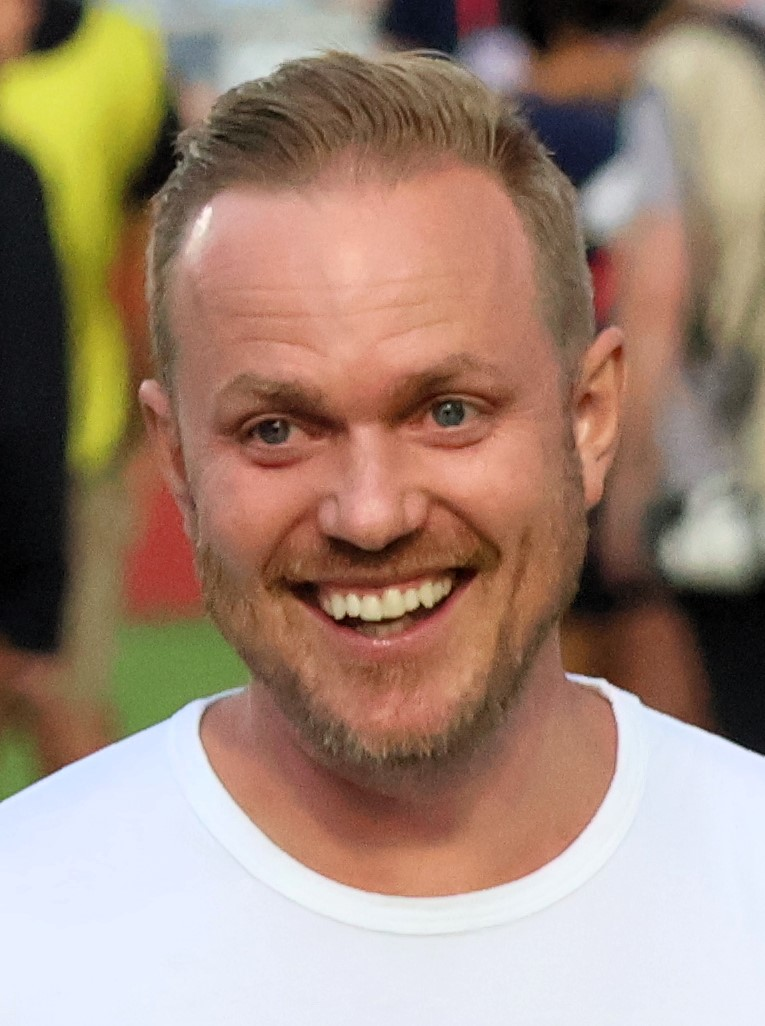
- Eidevall in 2025

Personal information
- Date of birth: 28 January 1983 (age 43)
- Place of birth: Borås, Sweden

Team information
- Current team: San Diego Wave (head coach)

Managerial career
- Years: Team
- 2009–2011: Lunds BK
- 2013–2014: Rosengård
- 2018–2021: Rosengård
- 2021–2024: Arsenal
- 2025–: San Diego Wave

Jonas Eidevall (born 28 January 1983) is a Swedish professional football coach who is the head coach of San Diego Wave FC of the National Women's Soccer League (NWSL). He was the head coach of Women's Super League club Arsenal from 2021 to 2024, where he won back-to-back FA Women's League Cups. He was the head coach of Swedish club FC Rosengård from 2013 to 2014 and 2018 to 2021, winning three Damallsvenskan titles and one Swedish Cup.

== Career ==
=== Early career ===
Eidevall began his coaching career at the age of 23, as an assistant coach for Division 2 side Lunds BK in Skåne. After three and a half years as an assistant, he was named the club's coach. In 2009, he led the club to a first-place finish in Division 2 and promotion to Ettan Fotboll.

=== FC Rosengård ===
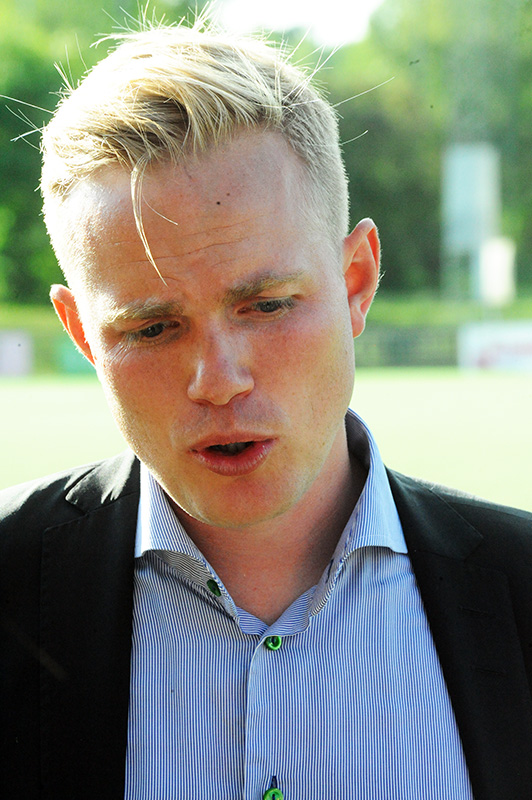
Eidevall in 2014

In 2012, he left Lund to join Damallsvenskan side FC Rosengård as an assistant manager. In 2013, he took over as Rosengård's head coach. He led the side to back-to-back first-place finishes in 2013 and 2014.

=== Lyngby Boldklub ===
He left Rosengård in 2014 to join Danish 1st Division side Lyngby Boldklub as an assistant manager, serving under Jack Majgaard Jensen.

=== Helsingborgs IF ===
He left Rosengård in 2016 to join Superettan side Helsingborgs IF as an assistant manager, serving under Henrik Larsson.

=== Return to Rosengård ===
After one year at Helsingborgs, he returned to Rosengård. He led the club to a Svenska Cupen Damer victory in 2018 and another league title in 2019. In 2019, he also led Rosengård to the Champions League quarter-finals.

=== Arsenal ===
In June 2021, Eidevall was named head coach for FA WSL side Arsenal, replacing Joe Montemurro. Arsenal conducted a thorough recruitment process in which Eidevall was the unanimous choice from everybody involved in the process. Arsenal's CEO Vinai Venkatesham said that "he was the standout candidate for everybody that we considered for this role". In his first season at Arsenal, Eidevall guided the team to 2nd place in the FA WSL and to a quarter-final appearance in UEFA Women's Champions League, where Arsenal was eliminated by VfL Wolfsburg. He extended his contract with club at the end of the season in a joint signing session with Mikel Arteta.

The following year, Arsenal finished at 3rd place in FA WSL and reached the Semi-finals in UEFA Women's Champions League after winning their group ahead of reigning champions Olympique Lyonnais and knocking-out FC Bayern Munich in the Quarter-finals. The semi-final against VfL Wolfsburg went to extra time where the German team scored the only goal. Eidevall won his first trophy with the club, beating Chelsea 3–1 at Selhurst Park in the final of the FA Women's League Cup.

In the 2023–24 season, Arsenal finished at 3rd place in FA WSL and lost to Paris FC after a penalty shoot-out in the final of the Round 1 Mini-Tournament in UEFA Women's Champions League. Arsenal defended their FA Women's League Cup trophy by again beating Chelsea F.C. Women in the final. Eidevall resigned from his role in October 2024 after a poor start to the 2024–25 WSL season, winning just one of the opening four games.

=== San Diego Wave ===
Eidevall was named head coach for San Diego Wave FC of the National Women's Soccer League (NWSL) on 7 January 2025.

== Coaching style ==
Eidevall has described his coaching style as a "high-paced possession game." He is described as a passionate coach on the side-lines but calm and analytical outside the pitch by his former players.

Manchester City W.F.C. head coach Gareth Taylor accused Eidevall of "bullying" the 4th official after Arsenal beat Manchester City with 2–1 at Meadow Park on 5 November 2023. Eidevall denied the accusations and labelled them "borderline slander" and Eidevall was not booked or spoken to by the referee in regards to his conduct during the game.

Chelsea F.C. Women head coach Emma Hayes pushed Eidevall after the final of the FA Women's League Cup in 2023/24 when both managers were going to shake hands after the match. In her post-match remarks said that Eidevall had shown "male aggression" on the sidelines. Eidevall said after that he thought her words were "irresponsible" and he was supported by Ian Wright who criticised Hayes' behaviour.

== Managerial statistics ==
As of 23 March 2026

Team	Nat.	Year	Record								Ref
Team	Nat.	Year	G	W	D	L	GF	GA	GD	Win %	Ref
FC Rosengård	Sweden	2018–2021	87	56	18	13	212	59	+153	64.37	
Arsenal	England	2021–2024	120	80	16	24	291	99	+192	66.67	
San Diego Wave	United States	2025–	29	11	7	11	43	37	+6	37.93	
Career Total			232	146	41	45	543	190	+353	62.93	

== Honours ==
FC Rosengård

- Damallsvenskan: 2013, 2014, 2019
- Swedish Cup: 2017–18

Arsenal

- FA Women's League Cup: 2022–23, 2023–24
