= Gwaze =

Gwaze is a Zimbabwean surname. Notable people with the surname include:

- Dzikamai Gwaze, a Zimbabwean footballer
- Robert Gwaze, a Zimbabwean chess player
- Titus Gwaze, a Zimbabwean rugby league footballer
