= Radomiak Radom =

Polish football club

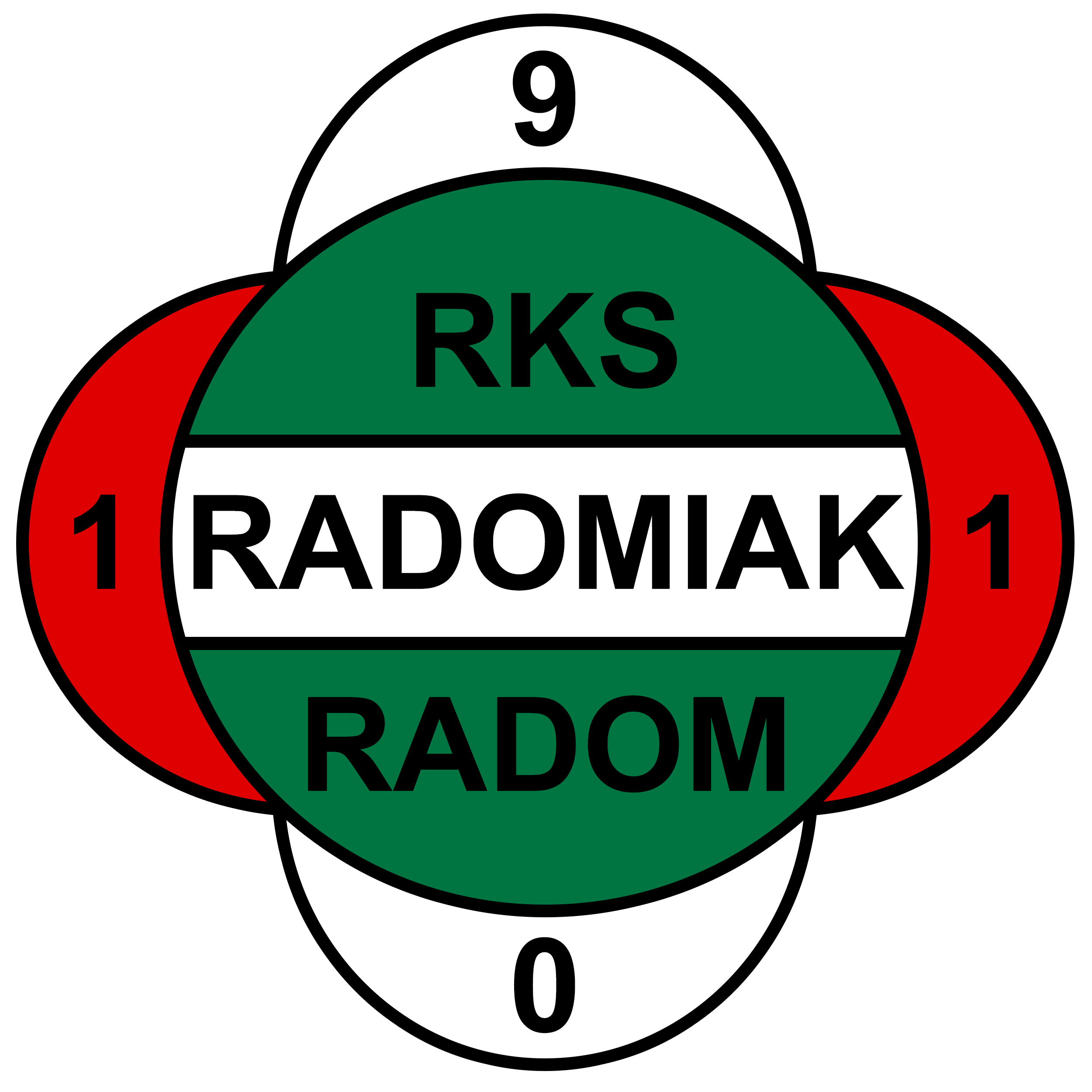
- Full name: Radomiak Spółka Akcyjna
- Nicknames: Zieloni (The Greens); Warchoły (The Brawlers)
- Founded: 1910; 116 years ago
- Ground: Stadion im. Braci Czachorów
- Capacity: 14,440
- Chairman: Sławomir Stempniewski
- Manager: John Carver
- League: Ekstraklasa
- 2025–26: Ekstraklasa, 10th of 18
- Website: rksradomiak.pl
| Home colours | Away colours | Third colours |

Radomiak Spółka Akcyjna (Radomiak S.A.), commonly referred to as Radomiak Radom, is a Polish football club based in Radom, Poland. The club was founded in 1910 and competes in Ekstraklasa, the top level of Polish football. They play their home matches at the Stadion im. Braci Czachorów.

== History ==
In 1910, the Russian rulers of Poland gave permission to establish the Radomskie Towarzystwo Sportowe (lit. 'The Sporting Fellowship of Radom', or "'Radom Sports Association'). The newly formed RTS consisted of five sections, namely football, cycling, tennis, ice skating, and gymnastics. In 1911, the footballers of RKS played their first match – a 5–2 defeat to Stella Warsaw.

In 1924, the Radom Sports Association won promotion to Warsaw Class B, which was the second tier of the Polish football system at the time (the Ekstraklasa was not established until 1927). In 1925 they won promotion to Warsaw Class A, and in 1928 all teams from Radom were moved to the Kielce League, which included the cities of Radom, Kielce, Częstochowa and the Zagłębie Dąbrowskie region. The team won promotion to the Kielce League (Class A), beating Hakoah Będzin and KS Sosnowiec. After winning the Kielce League, Radom played in the play-offs for the Ekstraklasa, where they were defeated by both Podgórze Kraków and Naprzód Lipiny.

For the rest of the 1930s, Radom was one of the best teams in the league, but failed to qualify for the highest level of Polish football. During the Second World War, the team ceased to exist and returned in April 1945 in a match against Czarni Radom. In 1947, after winning the regional games, Radom again played in the Ekstraklasa play-offs and lost to Widzew Łódź. Meanwhile, in April 1945, the Sports Club Bata was founded in Radom. This name remained in use until July 1945, when the team was renamed the Radomiak Sports Club. The new team won the regional games and also the Warsaw championship after beating Polonia Warsaw.

In 1946, Radomiak played in the regional play-offs for the 1946 Polish Championship. They defeated KS Lublinianka 5–0 and eventually lost 3–1 to ŁKS Łódź in the final. On 19 July 1947, Marian Czachor became the first player from Radom to make appearance for Poland, in a match against Romania.

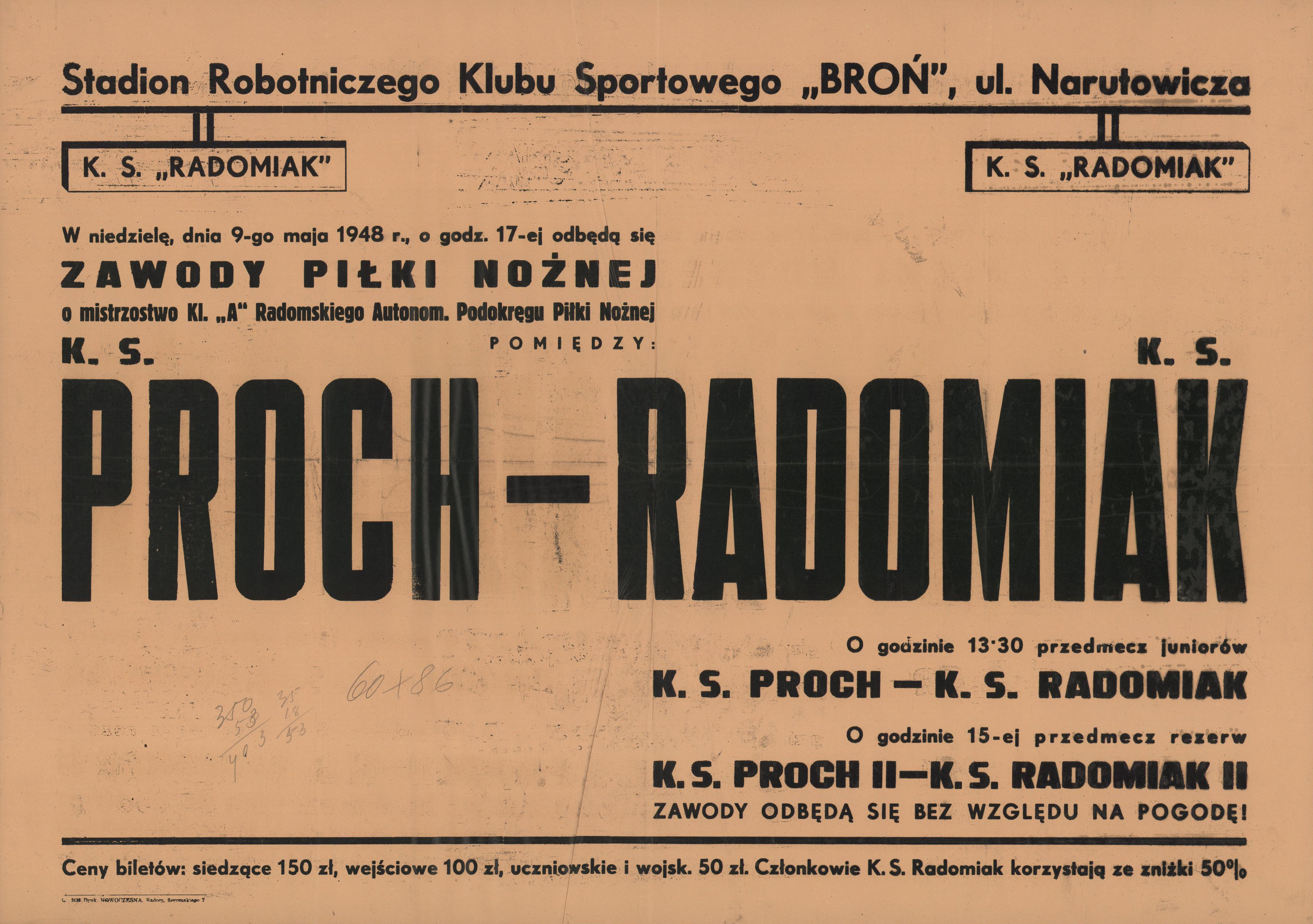
Poster advertising a regional league match between Radomiak and Proch Pionki, 1948

In 1948, Radomiak entered the newly formed second division and remained there until 1952. For several years, Radomiak played in the third and fourth divisions. In 1967, Radomiak merged with the Radom Sports Association, and a new organization, the Radom Sports Club Radomiak, was founded. In 1969, the team won promotion to the second division, but was quickly relegated. Radomiak returned to the second division in 1974, but was again immediately relegated.

In 1977, Radomiak was again promoted to the second division. This time, the team from Radom stayed there for several years. In the 1982–83 season, they finished in second place after Motor Lublin. Before the 1983–84 season, Radomiak was considered one of the favorites, and the team proved their class, gaining promotion on 20 June 1984 after beating Hutnik Warsaw 2–1.

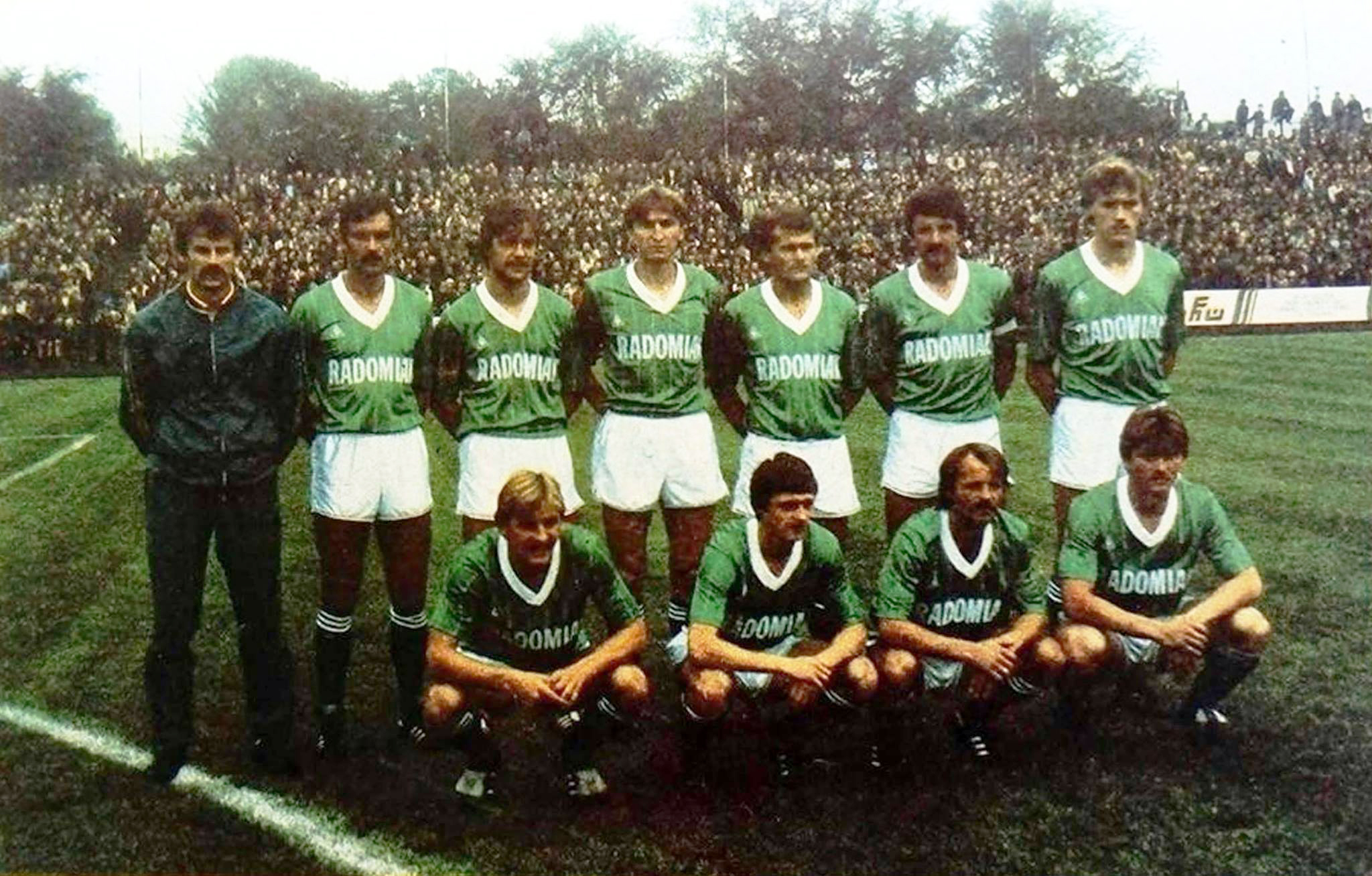
Radomiak team before a home game with Legia Warsaw in the 1984–85 Ekstraklasa

In their first, historic match in the Ekstraklasa, Radomiak defeated Bałtyk Gdynia 3–0 at home. After the autumn part of the season, Radomiak was in fifth place, seven points behind the league leaders Legia Warsaw. The spring part of the 1984–85 Ekstraklasa turned out to be a disappointment, as Radomiak kept losing, and was relegated together with Wisła Kraków. In 1989, Radomiak was relegated to the third division, and returned to the second level in June 1993. With Rafał Siadaczka as their top player, the team from Radom finished the 1993–94 season in fourth place. The next season, however, they were relegated again.

In 2003–04, Radomiak finished second in the third division. They earned promotion to the second tier after defeating Tłoki Gorzyce in the promotion play-offs. In 2004–05, Radomiak avoided relegation after once again beating Tłoki Gorzyce, this time in the relegation play-offs. The next year, however, Radomiak lost the play-offs to Odra Opole and were relegated back to the third level.

In 2020–21, Radomiak won the second division and earned promotion to the Ekstraklasa for the first time in 36 years.

== Players ==
=== Current squad ===
As of 9 September 2026

Note: Flags indicate national team as defined under FIFA eligibility rules; some limited exceptions apply. Players may hold more than one non-FIFA nationality.

| No. | Pos. | Nation | Player |
|---|---|---|---|
| 1 | GK | POL | Filip Majchrowicz |
| 3 | DF | POL | Kryspin Szcześniak (on loan from Górnik Zabrze) |
| 7 | MF | SUR | Ché Nunnely |
| 8 | MF | GUI | Ibrahima Camará |
| 10 | MF | SUI | Roberto Alves |
| 11 | FW | CIV | Fernand Gouré |
| 12 | GK | POL | Cezary Wołowiec |
| 13 | DF | POL | Jan Grzesik |
| 14 | DF | CMR | Steve Kingue |
| 15 | FW | BFA | Abdoul Tapsoba |
| 16 | DF | POL | Mateusz Cichocki |
| 17 | MF | POL | Adam Żabicki |
| 18 | MF | ANG | Manu |
| 19 | DF | POL | Nicolas Dohojda |
| 21 | FW | GBS | Elves Baldé |
| 22 | MF | GRE | Anastasios Donis |
| 23 | MF | POL | Kacper Karasek |

| No. | Pos. | Nation | Player |
|---|---|---|---|
| 24 | DF | CIV | Zié Ouattara |
| 26 | DF | ESP | Adrián Diéguez |
| 27 | MF | POL | Rafał Wolski (captain) |
| 28 | MF | POR | Romário Baró |
| 33 | DF | POL | Oskar Markiewicz |
| 37 | MF | POL | Mikołaj Molendowski |
| 39 | FW | BRA | Ruan Índio (on loan from Cruzeiro) |
| 44 | GK | POL | Wiktor Koptas |
| 47 | DF | POL | Szymon Kilianek |
| 72 | DF | POL | Filip Koperski |
| 77 | MF | GRE | Christos Donis |
| 80 | FW | BRA | Guilherme Luiz (on loan from Göztepe) |
| 82 | MF | BRA | Luquinhas |
| 90 | MF | STP | Ronaldo Afonso |
| 97 | DF | BRA | Conrado |
| 99 | GK | POL | Bartłomiej Gradecki |

=== Out on loan ===
Note: Flags indicate national team as defined under FIFA eligibility rules; some limited exceptions apply. Players may hold more than one non-FIFA nationality.

| No. | Pos. | Nation | Player |
|---|---|---|---|
| 5 | DF | FRA | Jérémy Blasco (at Ibiza until 30 June 2027) |
| 75 | GK | POL | Michał Jerke (at Olimpia Grudziądz until 30 June 2027) |

=== Retired numbers ===
Note: Flags indicate national team as defined under FIFA eligibility rules; some limited exceptions apply. Players may hold more than one non-FIFA nationality.

| No. | Pos. | Nation | Player |
|---|---|---|---|
| 9 | FW | BRA | Leândro Rossi (2012–26) |

== Managerial history ==
- 1945–1946: Marian Matyjaśkiewicz
- 1947–1948: (Czech Republic) Rudolf Vytlačil
- 1949–1951: Marian Matyjaśkiewicz
- 1952: Stanisław Klocek
- 1953–1955: Henryk Zatorski
- 1956: Tadeusz Trojan, Marian Łańko
- 1957–1960: Karol Żelazny
- 1960–1962: Tadeusz Rusinowicz
- 1962–1963: Witold Klocek, Karol Żelazny
- 1963–1964: Kazimierz Kszczotek, Adam Wapiennik
- 1964–1965: Kazimierz Kszczotek, Lech Chalabry
- 1965–1966: Kazimierz Kszczotek, Leszek Krzysiak
- 1966–1969: Leszek Krzysiak
- 1969–1970: Leszek Krzysiak, Władysław Piec, Stanisław Baran
- 1970–1971: Stanisław Baran, Longin Janeczek
- 1971–1972: Kazimierz Kszczotek, Leopold Rejmer, Leszek Krzysiak
- 1972–1974: Leszek Krzysiak
- 1974–1975: Leszek Krzysiak, Stanisław Pawłowski
- 1975–1976: Stanisław Pawłowski
- 1976–1977: Stanisław Pawłowski, Rudolf Kapera
- 1977–1978: Rudolf Kapera
- 1978–1979: Rudolf Kapera, Tadeusz Wanat, Paweł Kowalski
- 1979–1981: Paweł Kowalski
- 1981–1982: Paweł Kowalski, Marek Równy, Józef Antoniak
- 1982–1985: Józef Antoniak
- 1985–1986: Mariusz Łaski, Zygmunt Ocimek, Michał Leonowicz
- 1986–1987: Jur Zieliński, Aleksander Papiewski, Jur Zieliński
- 1987–1988: Jur Zieliński
- 1988–1989: Jur Zieliński, Jerzy Leszczyński
- 1989–1993: Józef Antoniak
- 1993–1994: Józef Antoniak, Jur Zieliński
- 1994–1995: Jur Zieliński
- 1995–1996: Jur Zieliński, Maciej Jaśkiewicz, Mirosław Peresada
- 1996–1997: Arkadiusz Skonieczny, Bolesław Strzemiński
- 1997–1998: Bolesław Strzemiński
- 1998–1999: Bolesław Strzemiński, Włodzimierz Andrzejewski
- 1999–2000: Bolesław Strzemiński, Jur Zieliński
- 2000–2001: Jur Zieliński, Janusz Pietrasik, Tadeusz Łukiewicz, Jur Zieliński
- 2001–2002: Jerzy Rot
- 2002–2003: Jerzy Rot, Włodzimierz Andrzejewski
- 2003–2004: Włodzimierz Andrzejewski, Jerzy Engel Jr.
- 2004–2005: Jan Makowiecki, Arkadiusz Skonieczny, Mieczysław Broniszewski
- 2005–2006: Mieczysław Broniszewski, Mariusz Kuras, Arkadiusz Skonieczny, Witold Mroziewski
- 2006–2007: Witold Mroziewski, Józef Antoniak, Jacek Kacprzak
- 2007–2008: Jerzy Engel Jr., Jerzy Wójcik
- 2008–2009: Zbigniew Wachowicz
- 2009–2010: Jerzy Rot, Arkadiusz Grzyb
- 2010–2011: Arkadiusz Grzyb, Grzegorz Wesołowski, Arkadiusz Grzyb, Arkadiusz Skonieczny, Piotr Wątorski
- 2011–2012: Dariusz Dźwigała, Armin Tomala
- 2012–2013: Armin Tomala, Janusz Niedźwiedź
- 2013–2014: Janusz Niedźwiedź, Mirosław Kosowski, Marcin Jałocha
- 2014–2015: Jacek Magnuszewski
- 2015–2016: Jacek Magnuszewski, (Czech Republic) Verner Lička
- 2016–2017: (Czech Republic) Verner Lička, Robert Podoliński
- 2017–2018: Jerzy Cyrak, Grzegorz Opaliński
- 2018–2022: Dariusz Banasik
- 2022–2023: Mariusz Lewandowski
- 2023: (Romania) Constantin Gâlcă
- 2023–2024: Maciej Kędziorek
- 2024: (Portugal) Bruno Baltazar
- 2025: (Portugal) João Henriques
- 2025–2026: (Portugal) Gonçalo Feio
- 2026: (Spain) Kiko Ramírez
- 2026: (Portugal) Bruno Baltazar
- 2026: Tomasz Kaczmarek
- 2026: Rafał Grzyb
- 2026–present: (England) John Carver

== See also ==
- Radomiak Radom II (reserve team)
