= Tomasz Strejlau =

Polish football manager

Personal information
- Date of birth: 1967 (age 58–59)

Managerial career
- Years: Team
- 2000–2001: Hutnik Warsaw
- 2005–2007: Legia Warsaw (assistant)
- 2007–2008: Polonia Warsaw (assistant)
- 2008: Polonia Warsaw

Tomasz Strejlau (born 1967) is a Polish former professional football manager. He was named the manager of Polonia Warsaw in 2008.
