= MLS Defender of the Year Award =

North American soccer award

The Major League Soccer Defender of the Year Award is an annual award handed out to the top defender in Major League Soccer annually since the league's inception in 1996. The award is decided based on votes from MLS players, MLS coaches and executives and media members.

John Doyle won the inaugural award with the San Jose Clash for the 1996 MLS season.

== Winners ==
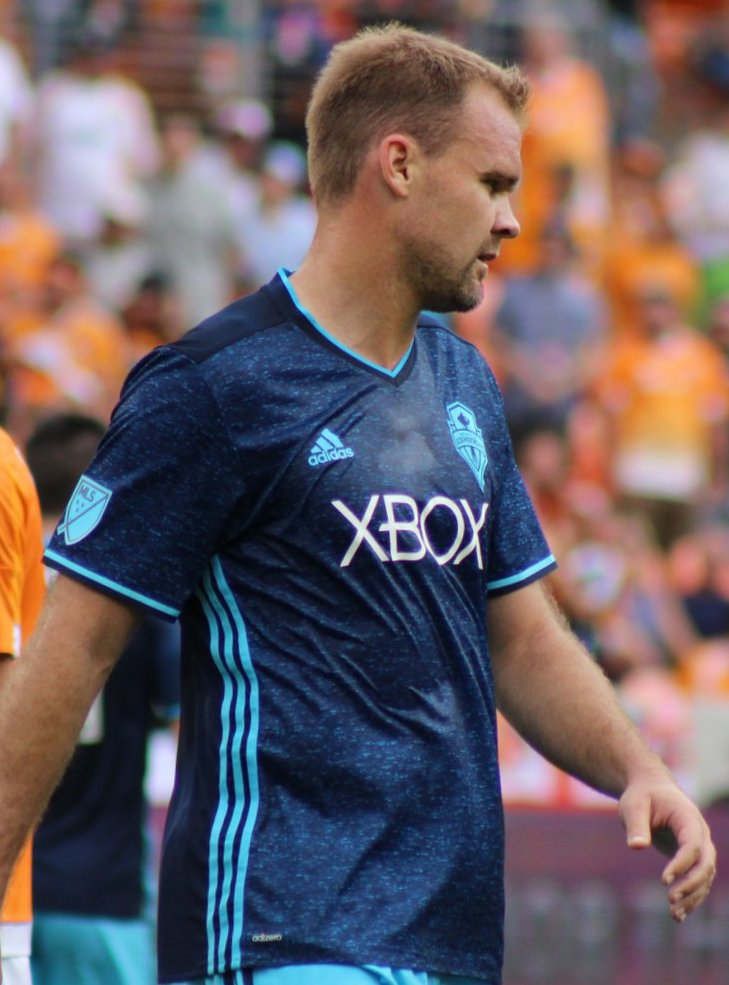
With three wins, Chad Marshall has won the most MLS Defender of the Year Awards.

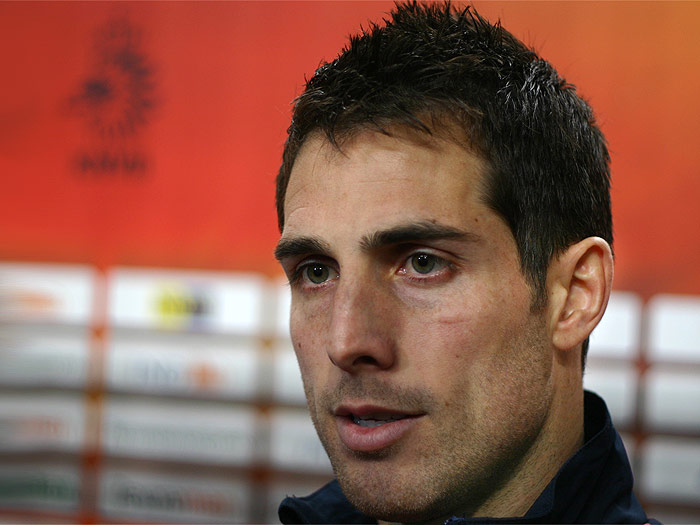
US men's national team player Carlos Bocanegra is a two-time winner of the award.

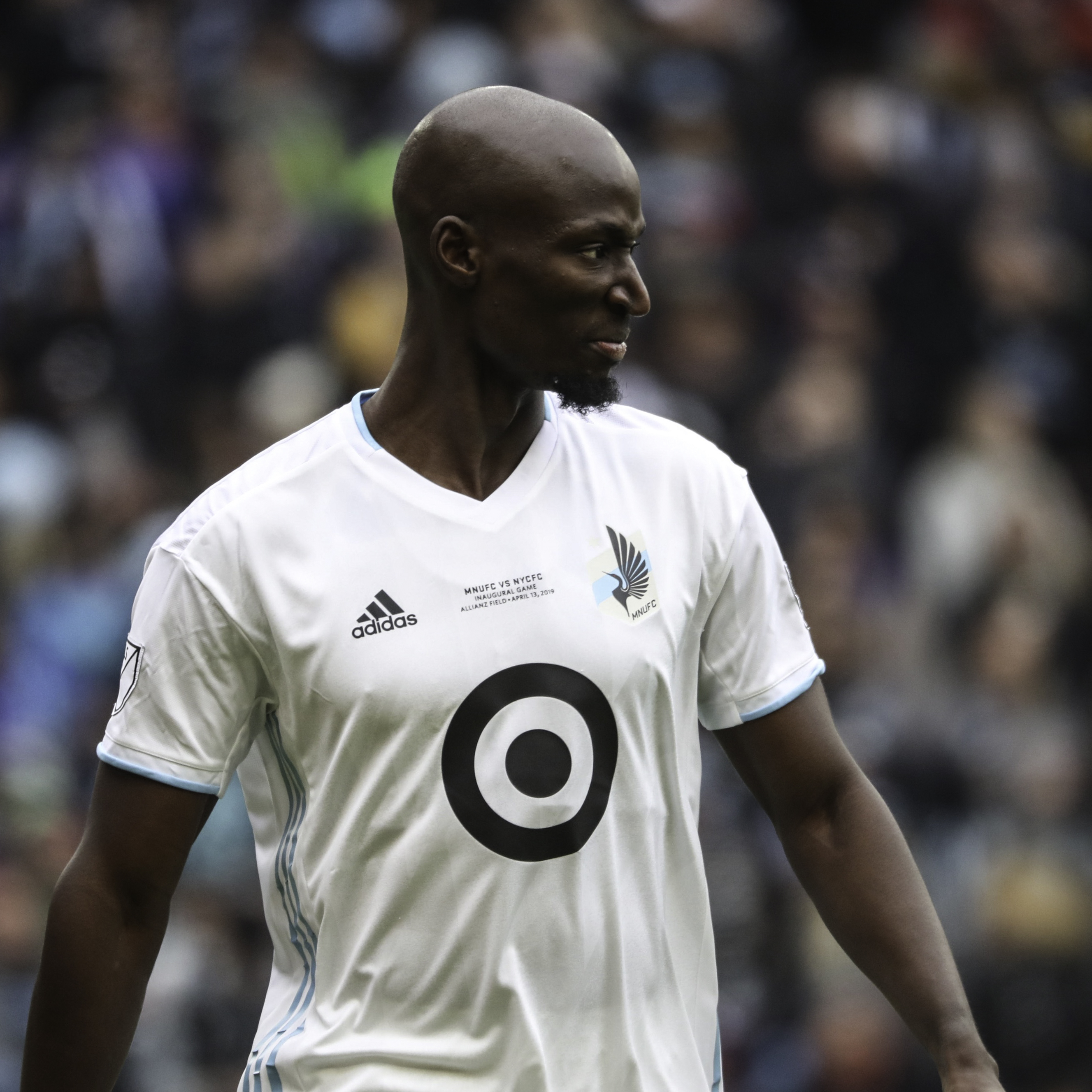
Ike Opara won the award with both Sporting Kansas City and Minnesota United FC.

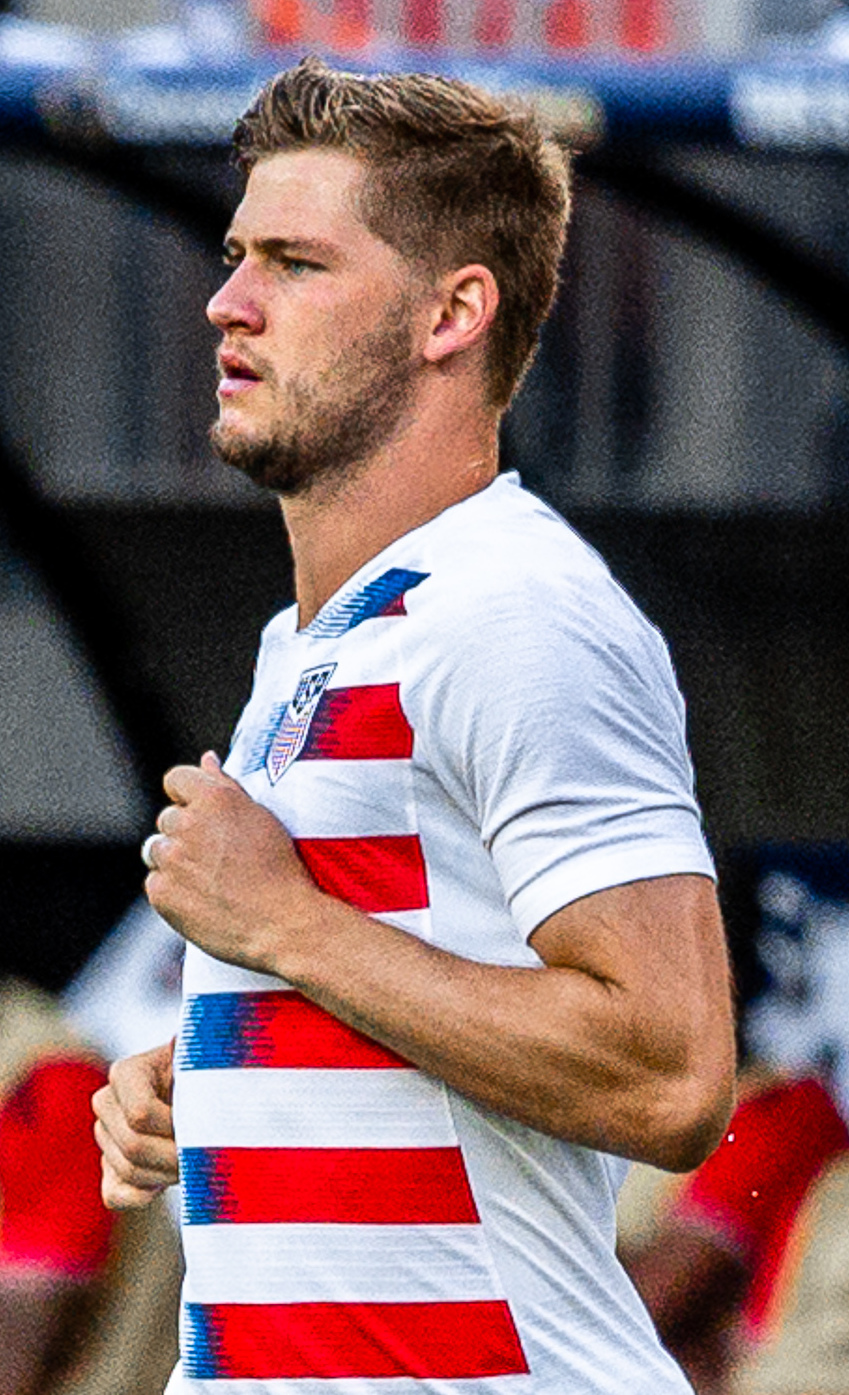
Walker Zimmerman won the award back-to-back with Nashville SC

| Season | Winner | Team | Finalists |
|---|---|---|---|
| 1996 | (United States) John Doyle | San Jose Clash | |
| 1997 | (United States) Eddie Pope | D.C. United | |
| 1998 | (Czech Republic) Luboš Kubík | Chicago Fire | |
| 1999 | (United States) Robin Fraser | Los Angeles Galaxy | |
| 2000 | (United States) Peter Vermes | Kansas City Wizards | |
| 2001 | (United States) Jeff Agoos | San Jose Earthquakes | |
| 2002 | (United States) Carlos Bocanegra | Chicago Fire | |
| 2003 | (United States) Carlos Bocanegra (2) | Chicago Fire | |
| 2004 | (United States) Robin Fraser (2) | Columbus Crew | Jimmy Conrad; Eddie Pope |
| 2005 | (United States) Jimmy Conrad | Kansas City Wizards | Danny Califf; Tyrone Marshall |
| 2006 | (United States) Bobby Boswell | D.C. United | Jimmy Conrad; Jose Burciaga |
| 2007 | (United States) Michael Parkhurst | New England Revolution | |
| 2008 | (United States) Chad Marshall | Columbus Crew | Jimmy Conrad; Bakary Soumare |
| 2009 | (United States) Chad Marshall (2) | Columbus Crew | |
| 2010 | (Colombia) Jámison Olave | Real Salt Lake | Omar Gonzalez; Nat Borchers |
| 2011 | (United States) Omar Gonzalez | Los Angeles Galaxy | Jámison Olave; Nat Borchers; Carlos Valdés |
| 2012 | (United States) Matt Besler | Sporting Kansas City | Víctor Bernárdez; Aurélien Collin; Jay DeMerit |
| 2013 | (Portugal) José Gonçalves | New England Revolution | Matt Besler; Omar Gonzalez; Jámison Olave |
| 2014 | (United States) Chad Marshall (3) | Seattle Sounders FC | Bobby Boswell; Omar Gonzalez; Michael Parkhurst |
| 2015 | (Belgium) Laurent Ciman | Montreal Impact | Kendall Waston; Matt Hedges; Matt Miazga |
| 2016 | (United States) Matt Hedges | FC Dallas | Jelle Van Damme; Axel Sjöberg; Walker Zimmerman; Steve Birnbaum |
| 2017 | (United States) Ike Opara | Sporting Kansas City | Justin Morrow; Kendall Waston; Leandro González Pírez; Matt Besler |
| 2018 | (United States) Aaron Long | New York Red Bulls | Chad Marshall; Michael Parkhurst; Leandro González Pírez; Kemar Lawrence |
| 2019 | (United States) Ike Opara (2) | Minnesota United FC | Walker Zimmerman; Miles Robinson; Maxime Chanot; Eddie Segura; Aaron Long |
| 2020 | (United States) Walker Zimmerman | Nashville SC | Mark McKenzie; Jonathan Mensah; Anton Tinnerholm; Chris Mavinga; Richie Laryea |
| 2021 | (United States) Walker Zimmerman (2) | Nashville SC | Yeimar Gómez Andrade; Miles Robinson; Andreu Fontàs; DeJuan Jones |
| 2022 | (Norway) Jakob Glesnes | Philadelphia Union | Kai Wagner; Alexander Callens |
| 2023 | (United States) Matt Miazga | FC Cincinnati | Tim Parker; Yeimar Gómez Andrade |
| 2024 | (Cape Verde) Steven Moreira | Columbus Crew | Jordi Alba; Jackson Ragen |
| 2025 | (United States) Tristan Blackmon | Vancouver Whitecaps FC | Kai Wagner; Jakob Glesnes |
| 2026 | (Ghana) Maxwell Woledzi | Nashville SC | Jeisson Palacios; Andy Najar |

== Wins by club ==
| Club | Wins |
|---|---|
| Columbus Crew | 4 |
| Kansas City Wizards/Sporting KC | 4 |
| Chicago Fire | 3 |
| Nashville SC | 3 |
| D.C. United | 2 |
| LA Galaxy | 2 |
| New England Revolution | 2 |
| San Jose Clash/Earthquakes | 2 |
| FC Cincinnati | 1 |
| FC Dallas | 1 |
| Minnesota United FC | 1 |
| Montréal Impact/CF Montréal | 1 |
| New York Red Bulls | 1 |
| Philadelphia Union | 1 |
| Real Salt Lake | 1 |
| Seattle Sounders FC | 1 |
| FC Cincinnati | 1 |
| Vancouver Whitecaps FC | 1 |

== Wins by nationality ==
| Nationality | Wins |
|---|---|
| United States | 25 |
| Belgium | 1 |
| Cape Verde | 1 |
| Colombia | 1 |
| Czech Republic | 1 |
| Ghana | 1 |
| Norway | 1 |
| Portugal | 1 |
