= Włodzimierz Małowiejski =

Polish football manager

Personal information
- Date of birth: 17 May 1952 (age 74)
- Place of birth: Żychlin, Poland

Managerial career
- Years: Team
- 1990–1992: Wisła Płock
- 1994–1996: Hutnik Warsaw
- 1996–1997: Polonia Warsaw (assistant)
- 1997–1998: Polonia Warsaw
- 2000: Górnik Zabrze (assistant)
- 2002–2003: KSZO Ostrowiec Świętokrzyski
- 2004: Widzew Łódź (assistant)
- 2005–2006: Podbeskidzie Bielsko-Biała
- 2006–2007: Lech Poznań II

Włodzimierz Małowiejski (born 17 May 1952) is a Polish former professional football manager. He debuted for Wisła Płock at age 17, but his playing career was ended six years later due to injuries and he remained at the club as a coach.
