= Antoni Giedrys =

Polish football manager

Personal information
- Date of birth: 17 January 1954 (age 72)

Managerial career
- Years: Team
- 1993–1994: Polonia Warsaw
- 1995–1996: Mazur Karczew
- 1997–1998: Świt Nowy Dwór Mazowiecki
- 2002–2003: Hutnik Warsaw
- 2007: Polonia Warsaw II

Antoni Giedrys (born 17 January 1954) is a Polish football manager.

In 2017, he was appointed the youth development coordinator at Polonia Warsaw.
