= Zbigniew Wachowicz =

Polish footballer

Personal information
- Date of birth: 12 January 1972 (age 54)
- Place of birth: Radom, Poland
- Height: 1.84 m (6 ft 0 in)
- Position: Defender

Senior career*
| Years | Team | Apps | (Gls) |
| 1989–1994 | Radomiak Radom | | |
| 1995 | Legia Warsaw | 0 | (0) |
| 1995–1996 | Polonia Warsaw | | |
| 1996 | Stomil Olsztyn | 9 | (1) |
| 1997 | Hakoah Amidar Ramat Gan | | |
| 1997–1998 | KSZO Ostrowiec Świętokrzyski | 26 | (0) |
| 1998–1999 | Stal Stalowa Wola | | |
| 2000 | RoPS | 17 | (0) |
| 2001–2002 | MG MZKS Kozienice | | |
| 2002–2003 | Korona Kielce | | |
| 2003–2008 | Radomiak Radom | | |
| 2009 | FC Orania Vianden | | |
- * Club domestic league appearances and goals

Zbigniew Wachowicz (born 12 January 1972) is a Polish former professional footballer who plays as a defender.

His former clubs include Legia Warsaw, Polonia Warsaw, Stomil Olsztyn and KSZO Ostrowiec. He had brief spells in Israel with Hakoah Maccabi Ramat Gan and Finland with RoPS.
