= Marek Janota =

Polish football manager (1937–2021)

Personal information
- Date of birth: 13 October 1937
- Place of birth: Warsaw, Poland
- Date of death: 15 August 2021 (aged 83)
- Place of death: Warsaw, Poland

Managerial career
- Years: Team
- KSZO Ostrowiec Świętokrzyski
- Skra Warsaw
- Agrykola Warsaw
- Huragan Wołomin
- 1974–1977: Poland U18
- 1977–1979: Persija Jakarta
- 1979: Indonesia
- 1980–1981: Hutnik Warsaw
- Korona Góra Kalwaria

Marek Janota (13 October 1937 – 15 August 2021) was a Polish football manager.

== Career ==
Janota managed the Indonesia national football team and Indonesian sides Persib Bandung and Persija Jakarta, helping them win the league.

== Honours ==
Persija Jakarta

- Perserikatan: 1978–79
