= Bogusław Baniak =

Polish association football player (born 1958)

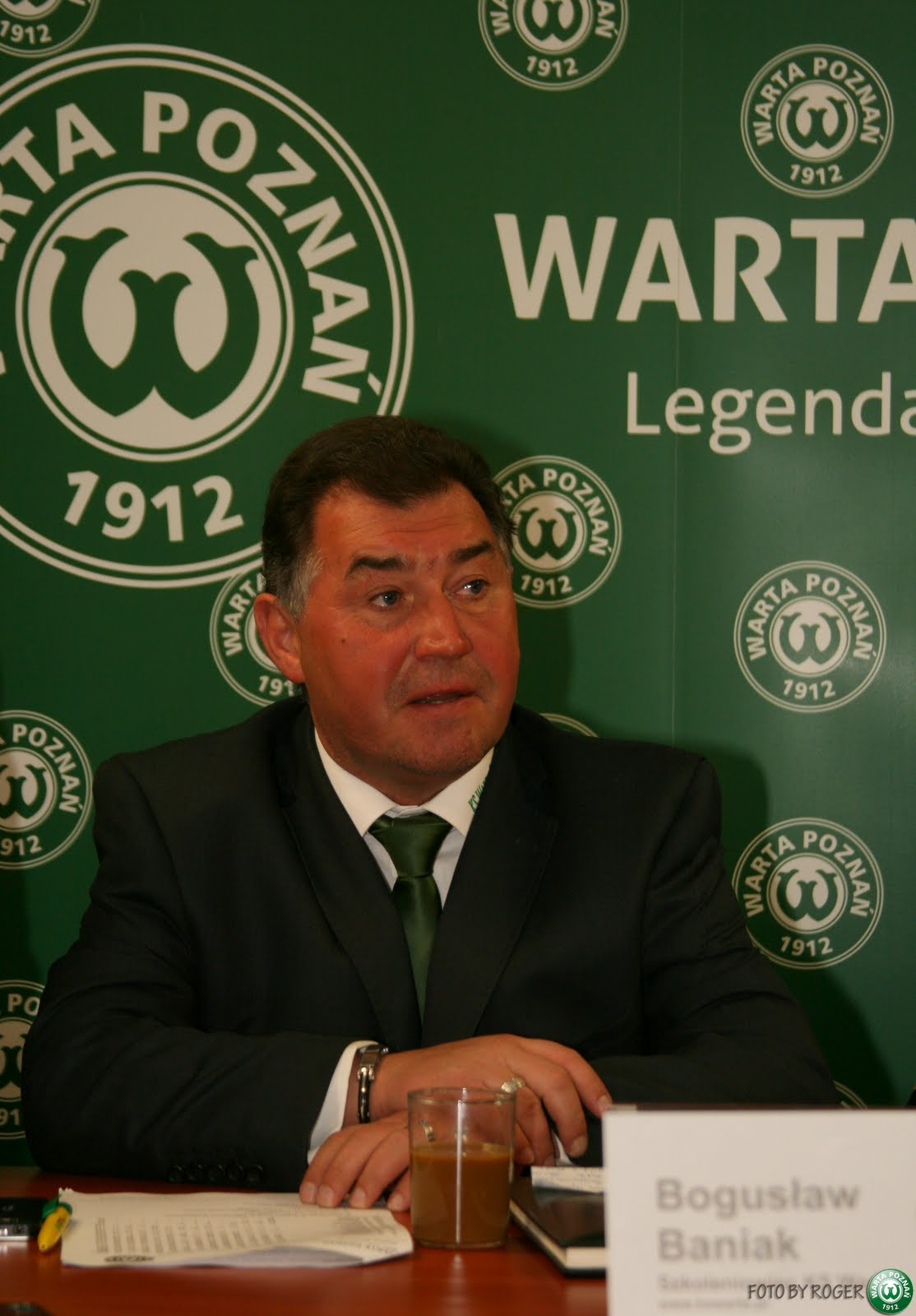

Personal information
- Full name: Bogusław Stanisław Baniak
- Date of birth: 23 September 1958 (age 68)
- Place of birth: Pyrzyce, Poland
- Height: 1.73 m (5 ft 8 in)
- Position: Midfielder

Senior career*
Years	Team	Apps	(Gls)
1976–1986	Pogoń Szczecin		
- → Energetyk Gryfino (loan)
1986–1988	Pierikos Katerini		

Managerial career
- 1989–1990: Pogoń Szczecin II
- 1992: Pogoń Szczecin
- 1994: Amica Wronki
- 1995: Stal Rzeszów
- 1995: Stilon Gorzów Wielkopolski
- 1996: Błękitni Stargard Szczeciński
- 1996–1997: Stal Rzeszów
- 1997: Chemik Police
- 1997–1999: Pogoń Szczecin
- 1999–2000: Odra Opole
- 2001–2002: Lech Poznań
- 2003–2004: Pogoń Szczecin
- 2005–2006: Kujawiak Włocławek
- 2006–2007: Zawisza/Kujawiak; Hydrobudowa Bydgoszcz
- 2007: Pogoń Szczecin
- 2007–2009: Warta Poznań
- 2010: Motor Lublin
- 2011: Warta Poznań
- 2011–2013: Miedź Legnica
- 2013–2014: Flota Świnoujście
- 2015–2017: Burkina Faso U15
- 2015–2017: Burkina Faso U17
- 2018: Górnik Łęczna
- 2021: Turon Yaypan (caretaker)
- 2022–2023: Olimpia Grudziądz
- * Club domestic league appearances and goals

Boguslaw Stanisław Baniak (born 23 September 1958), nicknamed Bebeto is a Polish professional football manager and former player who was most recently in charge of Polish club Olimpia Grudziądz. Besides Poland, he has managed in Burkina Faso and Uzbekistan.

== Career ==
Baniak started his managerial career with Pogoń Szczecin. After that, he coached Amica Wronki, Stal Rzeszów, Stilon Gorzów Wielkopolski, Odra Opole, Lech Poznań, Kujawiak-Zawisza, Warta Poznań, Motor Lublin, and Miedź Legnica. In 2013, he was appointed head coach of Flota Świnoujście in the Polish I liga, a position he held until 2014.

== Honours ==
Lech Poznań

- II liga: 2001–02

Pogoń Szczecin

- II liga: 2003–04

Miedź Legnica

- II liga West: 2011–12

Olimpia Grudziądz

- III liga, group III: 2022–23
