= Albin Mikulski =

Polish footballer

Personal information
- Date of birth: 3 January 1957 (age 69)
- Place of birth: Sieniawa, Poland
- Height: 1.77 m (5 ft 10 in)
- Position: Forward

Youth career
- KS Sieniawa

Senior career*
Years	Team	Apps	(Gls)
1974–1976	Avia Świdnik		
1976–1977	Stal Stalowa Wola		
1977–1986	Ruch Chorzów	235	(47)
1988–1990	Polonia Sydney SC		

Managerial career
- 1995–1998: Wawel Kraków
- 1998: Odra Wodzisław
- 1999: Odra Opole
- 1999–2000: Pogoń Szczecin
- 2000: Wisła Płock
- 2000–2001: Polonia Warsaw
- 2002: Pogoń Szczecin
- 2003–2004: Szczakowianka Jaworzno
- 2006: Cracovia
- 2007: Stal Stalowa Wola
- 2007–2008: Hutnik Kraków
- * Club domestic league appearances and goals

Albin Mikulski (born 3 January 1957) is a Polish former professional football manager and player who played as a midfielder.

== Honours ==
=== Player ===
Ruch Chorzów

- Ekstraklasa: 1978–79

=== Manager ===
Wawel Kraków

- III liga, group VI: 1995–96

Polonia Warsaw

- Polish Cup: 2000–01
