= Piotr Wiśnik =

Polish football manager

Personal information
- Date of birth: 6 August 1950 (age 76)

Managerial career
- Years: Team
- 1986–1987: Znicz Pruszków
- 1987–1989: Ursus Warsaw
- 1992–1993: Polonia Warsaw (assistant)
- 1993: Polonia Warsaw
- 1994–1997: Hutnik Warsaw
- 1997: Jagiellonia Białystok
- 1997–1998: Hutnik Warsaw
- 1998–2001: Dolcan Ząbki
- 2003–2004: Pogoń Grodzisk Mazowiecki
- 2004–2005: Mszczonowianka Mszczonów
- 2005–2006: Dolcan Ząbki

Piotr Wiśnik is a Polish former football manager and physiologist. He coached semi-professional and professional football from 1980 to 2006. He became a physiologist advising teams on nutrition and wellness.
