= Paweł Drumlak =

Polish footballer (born 1976)

Personal information
- Date of birth: 2 March 1976 (age 50)
- Place of birth: Szczecin, Poland
- Height: 1.76 m (5 ft 9 in)
- Position: Midfielder

Senior career*
Years	Team	Apps	(Gls)
1990–1992	Stal Stocznia Szczecin		
1993–1994	Pogoń Szczecin		
1994–1995	Energetyk Gryfino		
1995–1996	FC Luzern		
1996–2002	Pogoń Szczecin	129	(13)
2002–2003	Zagłębie Lubin	17	(1)
2003	Pogoń Szczecin	14	(4)
2004–2007	Cracovia	51	(4)
2008–2010	ŁKS Łódź	26	(0)

International career
2002	Poland	1	(0)
- * Club domestic league appearances and goals

Paweł Drumlak (born 2 March 1976) is a Polish former professional footballer who played as a midfielder.
