= Jerzy Engel Jr. =

Polish footballer and manager (born 1979)

Jerzy Engel junior
Personal information
- Date of birth: 20 November 1979 (age 46)
- Place of birth: Warsaw, Poland

Team information
- Current team: Narew Ostrołęka (sporting director)

Senior career*
Years	Team	Apps	(Gls)
- Polonia Warsaw

Managerial career
- 2000–2001: Polonia Warsaw II
- 2002–2003: Legionovia Legionowo
- 2003–2004: Błękitni Stargard
- 2004: Radomiak Radom
- 2005–2006: ŁKS Łomża
- 2006: Polonia Warsaw
- 2007–2008: Radomiak Radom
- 2010: Anorthosis Famagusta U21
- 2012: APOEL Nicosia U21
- 2021: Mazowsze Grójec
- 2021–2022: KS Warka
- 2022–2025: Mazowsze Grójec
- * Club domestic league appearances and goals

Jerzy Engel Jr. (born 20 November 1979) is a Polish professional football manager and former player. He is currently the sporting director of Narew Ostrołęka.

He followed in his father's Jerzy Engel's footsteps into management after his playing career was cut short by injury. Like his father, his career was associated for the most part with Polonia Warsaw, as a player, as a manager, and other non-playing roles.

After initial successes as a young manager, winning promotions to the second tier with Radomiak Radom and ŁKS Łomża in 2004 and 2006 respectively, he was sentenced for his role in the large-scale match-fixing scandal. He subsequently moved to Cyprus to lead youth academies and returned to Polonia in non-playing roles. After a four-year ban, he returned to coaching but in the lower divisions.

== Career ==
=== Playing career ===
As a player, Engel Jr. represented several teams including Polonia Warsaw. However, due to a shoulder injury, he was forced to end his playing career prematurely.

=== Management career ===
==== Early successes ====
He received his first coaching position with the reserve team of Polonia Warsaw. He left the Warsaw team as the club's financial situation began to deteriorate. He then coached the Fourth Division side Legionovia Legionowo and later the Third Division team Błękitni Stargard Szczeciński. At the end of the 2003–2004 season, he took over as the head coach of Radomiak Radom, replacing Włodzimierz Andrzejewski leading them to promotion to the Second Division.

He became an assistant coach to Marek Motyka at second tier Polonia Warsaw. Motyka had previously coached Stilon Gorzów that was relegated from the second tier after losing the playoff to Radomiak. This role marked the beginning of his collaboration with his father, who was the club's sporting director at the time.

During the 2005–06 season, Engel Junior coached ŁKS Łomża and achieved promotion to the second tier with them.

However, in the following seasons, due to conflicts with the club's management, he left the team early in the following season. On 14 August 2006, he was appointed the new coach of Polonia Warsaw, replacing the dismissed Andrzej Wiśniewski. His tenure at Polonia lasted until 23 October 2006, when he was replaced by Waldemar Fornalik. On 4 July 2007, Engel Jr. returned to coach Radomiak, which was then competing in the fourth tier.

==== Corruption scandal ====
Engel Jr. was arrested by the Central Anti-Corruption Bureau for alleged involvement in football-related corruption during the 2003–04 third division season. He was later released on a 30,000zł bail. He was close friends with Andrzej Blacha and Dariusz Wdowczyk both of whom were also heavily involved in the corruption scandal. On 5 June 2008, Engel Jr. denied the charges at a press conference, asserting his innocence and commitment to fair play.

==== Non-managerial positions ====
Engel Jr. was sports director at Polonia, as well head of scouting during the club's rebuilding in 2015 when his father was planning to take over the club.

He was offered running the Anorthosis Famagusta youth academy in October 2010. In the summer of 2012, he became technical director of APOEL Nicosia's youth academy. during his time there APOEL earned a tie with Real Madrid in the 2011–12 UEFA Champions League.

==== Sentencing for involvement in match-fixing ====
In December 2013, the District Court in Kielce found him guilty of rigging matches in favor of Korona Kielce during the 2003–04 season. Engel Jr. received an 18-month suspended sentence and a three-year probation period, along with a ban from professional football activities. Despite his continued denials the court ruled that he played a key role in the corruption scheme, facilitating bribes between coaches and referees. The verdict was not final, and he continued his coaching career until the court's decision. Investigators subsequently requested the suspension of his coaching license.

==== Return ====
Engel Jr. made a comeback to football after the four-year ban in January 2021, when he regained his coaching license. and was subsequently hired by Mazowsze Grójec. However his tenure was unsuccessful as the club was relegated from the fifth tier.

After a subsequent stint at KS Warka, he returned to Mazowsze once more on 1 December 2022.

On 1 July 2025, Engel was appointed sporting director of sixth tier side Narew Ostrołęka.

== Personal life ==
Jerzy Engel Jr. is the son of international footballer manager Jerzy Engel.

He attended school in Cyprus whilst his father managed Apollon Limassol, APOP Paphos and New Salamis.

In November 2017, Engel Jr. alongside his father, achieved a notable betting record at the Służewiec horse racing track, where together they won 140,000zł during the races, setting an all-time record for the venue.

== Honours ==
ŁKS Łomża

- III liga, group I: 2005–06
