= Robin Fraser =

American soccer player and coach (born 1966)

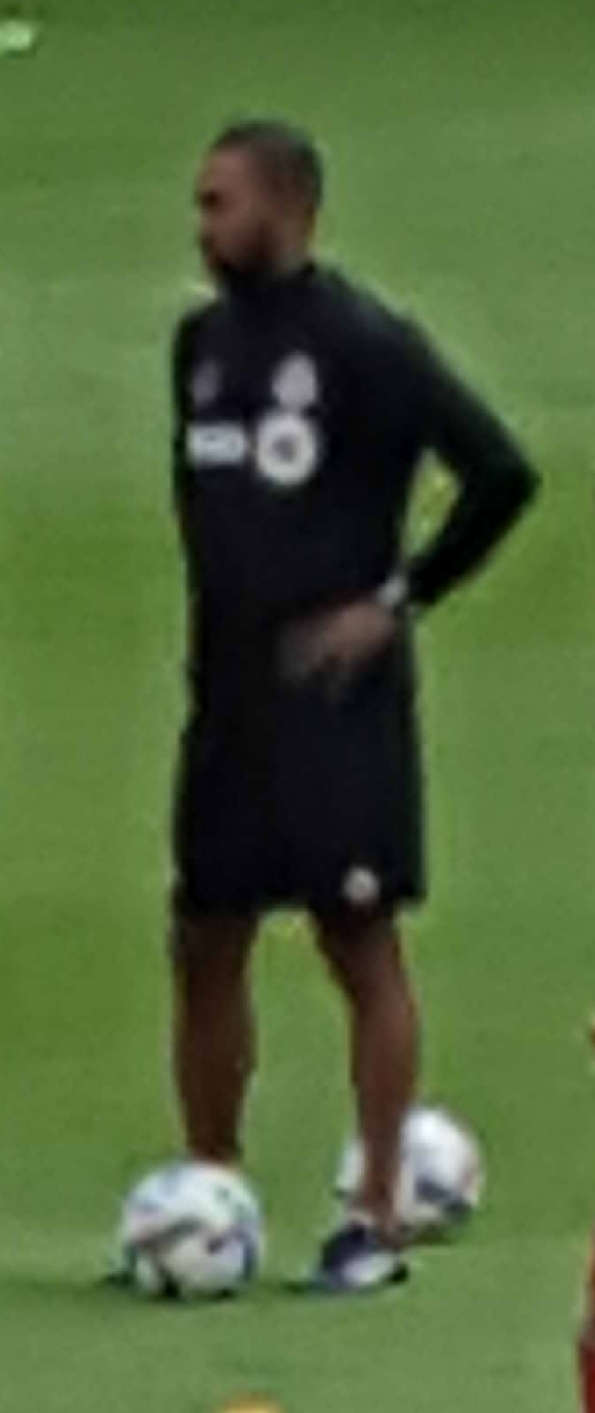
- Fraser in 2017

Personal information
- Date of birth: December 17, 1966 (age 59)
- Place of birth: Kingston, Jamaica
- Height: 6 ft 1 in (1.85 m)
- Position: Defender

Team information
- Current team: Toronto FC (head coach)

College career
Years	Team	Apps	(Gls)
1985–1988	FIU Golden Panthers		

Senior career*
Years	Team	Apps	(Gls)
1988–1989	Miami Sharks		
1990–1995	Colorado Foxes	93	(6)
1996–2000	Los Angeles Galaxy	129	(1)
2001–2003	Colorado Rapids	74	(0)
2004–2005	Columbus Crew	57	(0)
Total		353+	(7+)

International career
1988–2001	United States	27	(0)

Managerial career
- 2007–2011: Real Salt Lake (assistant)
- 2011–2012: Chivas USA
- 2013–2014: New York Red Bulls (assistant)
- 2015–2019: Toronto FC (assistant)
- 2019–2023: Colorado Rapids
- 2025–2026: Toronto FC
- * Club domestic league appearances and goals

Robin Fraser (born December 17, 1966) is a professional soccer coach and former player. He was most recently the head coach of Major League Soccer club Toronto FC. He previously served as head coach of Colorado Rapids and Chivas USA and as an assistant for Real Salt Lake, Toronto, and the New York Red Bulls.

A former defender, Fraser played six seasons in the American Professional Soccer League and ten in Major League Soccer. He earned 27 caps with the United States national team between 1988 and 2001.

== Youth and college ==
Fraser was born in Jamaica and grew up in Miami, Florida where he played soccer at Miami Palmetto High School. He played college soccer at Florida International University from 1984 to 1988, leading the team to an NCAA Division II Championship as a freshman. After the team moved to Division I before the 1987 season, he was recognized as a 1987 and 1988 second-team All-American, and was a finalist for the Hermann Trophy as a senior.

== Playing career ==
=== Professional ===
In 1988, Fraser signed with the Miami Sharks in the American Soccer League. He played two seasons with the Sharks. In 1990, he moved to the Colorado Foxes of the American Professional Soccer League, for whom he played from 1990 to 1995. While with the Foxes, Fraser was named an APSL All-Star four straight years, from 1992 to his final season in 1995.

When Major League Soccer was created, he was the Los Angeles Galaxy's first selection (fourth overall) in the 1996 MLS Inaugural Player Draft. Fraser played five seasons with Galaxy, and was named to the league's Best XI four times (1996, 1998, 1999, 2000), and was named MLS Defender of the Year in 1999.

Fraser was traded to the Colorado Rapids in a salary-cap-related move before the 2001 season. He spent three years in Colorado, before being traded to the Columbus Crew for two draft picks. Fraser anchored the Crew defense in 2004, and was once again considered one of the best in MLS at the position, winning his second Defender of the Year award and being named to his fifth Best XI while captaining the Crew to the Supporters' Shield. During the 2003 and 2004 season, Fraser helped mentor two of MLS's most promising young defenders, Nat Borchers and Chad Marshall. Never a big scorer, Fraser only scored one regular season and one playoff goal in his entire MLS career. He retired after the 2005 season.

Fraser was honored as one of The 25 Greatest players in MLS history on December 10, 2020.

=== International ===
Although Fraser was born in Jamaica, he chose to represent the United States at the international level, after becoming a citizen in June 1986. He made his debut against Chile on June 1, 1988, and amassed 27 caps. His last came in a scoreless tie with Ecuador on June 7, 2001.

== Coaching career ==
=== Early Career & Chivas USA ===
During the late 90s, Robin Fraser and Greg Vanney co-coached a local girls soccer club in Los Angeles California known as the Santa Anita Soccer Club or SASC. In 2007, Real Salt Lake hired Fraser as a third assistant coach. On January 4, 2011, Fraser was hired as the new head coach of Chivas USA, becoming the team's sixth coach in seven years.

Fraser was dismissed by Chivas after a two-year run saw him post a 15–32–21 record, including a 14-match winless streak in his second season. During the off-season, he was named as an assistant coach for the New York Red Bulls under new head coach Mike Petke.

After two season in New York, Fraser moved to Toronto FC, where served as assistant coach alongside head coach Greg Vanney. The two previously had worked together with Chivas USA, albeit in reversed roles, with Fraser the head man and Vanney working underneath him.

=== Colorado Rapids ===
On August 25, 2019, Fraser became the head coach for Colorado Rapids, following the dismissal of then intern head coach Conor Casey. The Rapids won their first three games under Fraser and won five of their last seven to close 2019 just shy of the playoffs. Colorado ended the season tied for the third-most goals scored in MLS with 58, the club's highest total since scoring 62 in 1998.

The Rapids' offensive growth continued in 2020. Colorado scored 32 goals in 18 games. The Rapids' 1.78 goals per game ranked sixth in MLS. Colorado posted a positive goal differential for the first time since 2016. On Sep 12, Colorado defeated Real Salt Lake, 5–0, earning its first ever win at Rio Tinto Stadium and reclaiming the Rocky Mountain Cup. The win also marked the Rapids' largest margin of victory ever, which they would match three games later in a 5–0 win over San Jose Earthquakes. Fraser led Colorado on a three-game winning streak, the second of his Rapids tenure, to close out the regular season and clinch a berth in the Audi 2020 MLS Cup Playoffs as the fifth seed in the Western Conference. Fraser posted the best 25-game start of any Rapids head coach in history, scoring 47 goals, winning 13 games and earning 43 points, which are the most by a Rapids head coach since the introduction of draws to MLS In 2000.

On March 23, 2022, the Rapids announced that Fraser had signed a new contract with the team, extending his tenure through the 2025 season. Fraser and the Rapids parted ways on September 5, 2023, as the Rapids were in last place in the Western Conference at that point in time.

=== Toronto FC ===
On January 10, 2025, Fraser was announced as the head coach of Toronto FC on a three-year contract. On November 9, 2026, after the conclusion of the MLS regular season, it was announced that Fraser had been relieved of his head coaching duties at Toronto FC, following back-to-back seasons in which the club failed to qualify for the playoffs.

== Coaching statistics ==
As of match played November 7, 2026

Coaching record by team and tenure
Team	Nat.	From	To	Record								Ref
Team	Nat.	From	To	G	W	D	L	GF	GA	GD	Win %	Ref
Chivas USA	(United States)	January 4, 2011	November 9, 2012	73	18	21	34	71	109	−38	24.66	
Colorado Rapids	(United States)	August 25, 2019	September 5, 2023	129	46	34	49	170	186	−16	35.66	
Toronto FC	(Canada)	January 10, 2025	November 9, 2026	70	15	27	28	92	116	−24	21.43	
Total				272	79	82	111	333	411	−78	29.04	

== Honors ==
=== Player ===
- MLS Cup
  - Runner-up: 1996, 1999
- MLS Supporters' Shield
  - Winner: 1998, 2004
  - Runner-up: 1996, 1999
- MLS Eastern Conference
  - Winners (Regular Season): 2004
- MLS Western Conference
  - Winners (Regular Season): 1996, 1998, 1999
  - Winners (Playoffs): 1996, 1999
- CONCACAF Champions' Cup
  - Winners: 2000
  - Runner-up: 1997

=== Assistant coach ===
- MLS Cup
  - Winners: 2009, 2017
- MLS Supporters' Shield
  - Winners: 2017
  - Runners-up: 2010
- MLS Eastern Conference
  - Winners (Playoff): 2009, 2016
- Canadian Championship
  - Winners: 2016, 2017, 2018
- CONCACAF Champions League
  - Runners-up: 2018

=== Individual ===
- MLS All-Star: 1996, 1998, 1999, 2000
- MLS Best XI: 1996, 1998, 1999, 2000, 2004
- MLS Defender of the Year: 1999, 2004
