= 1946 Polish Football Championship =

20th season of top-tier football league in Poland

Polish Football Championship
- Season: 1946
- Dates: 25 August 1946 – 1 December 1946
- Champions: Polonia Warsaw (1st title)
- Matches: 26
- Goals: 153 (5.88 per match)
- Top goalscorer: Henryk Spodzieja (8 goals)
- Biggest home win: Warta 10–2 PKS
- Biggest away win: Skra 3–5 Tęcza; ŁKS 3–5 Polonia (6 October 1946); Tęcza 1–3 Warta
- Highest scoring: Warta 10–2 PKS
- Longest winning run: 3 matches AKS; Polonia
- Longest unbeaten run: 4 matches AKS; Polonia; Warta
- Longest winless run: 3 matches AKS
- Longest losing run: 2 matches AKS; ŁKS; Warta
- Highest attendance: 25,000

The 1946 Polish Football Championship was the 20th edition of the Polish Football Championship and 18th completed season ended with the selection of a winner. The first season of the Polish championship after the end of World War II. Played by 18 regional champions in a cup system (qualifying round, first round and second round). The championship was decided in final tournament played among four teams. The champions were Polonia Warsaw, who won their 1st Polish title.

== Main phase (central) ==
=== Qualifying round ===
Team 1	Score	Team 2
Ognisko Siedlce	7–0	KKS Olsztyn
Burza Wrocław	1–2	PKS Szczecin

=== First round ===
Team 1	Score	Team 2
AKS Chorzów	5–3	Pomorzanin Toruń
RKU Sosnowiec	6–2	Gedania Gdańsk
Radomiak Radom	5–0	Lublinianka Lublin
Warta Poznań	10–2	PKS Szczecin
Skra Częstochowa	3–5	Tęcza Kielce
Polonia Warsaw	5–0	Ognisko Siedlce
Wisła Kraków	4–0	Czuwaj Przemyśl
ŁKS Łódź	8–1	Orzeł Gorlice

=== Second round ===
Team 1	Score	Team 2
Tęcza Kielce	1–3	Warta Poznań
Wisła Kraków	2–3	Polonia Warsaw
ŁKS Łódź	3–1	Radomiak Radom
AKS Chorzów	4–0	RKU Sosnowiec

=== Final tournament table ===
Pos	Team	Pld	W	D	L	GF	GA	GD	Pts
1	Polonia Warsaw	6	4	1	1	18	12	+6	9
2	Warta Poznań	6	2	2	2	16	17	−1	6
3	AKS Chorzów	6	2	1	3	17	11	+6	5
4	ŁKS Łódź	6	2	0	4	16	27	−11	4

Source: rsssf.com

== Top goalscorers ==
Rank	Player	Club	Goals
1	(Poland) Henryk Spodzieja	AKS Chorzów	8
2	(Poland) Jerzy Szularz	Polonia Warsaw	7
2	(Poland) Tadeusz Świcarz	Polonia Warsaw	7

== Bibliography ==
- Gowarzewski, Andrzej (2000). Encyklopedia Piłkarska Fuji. Liga Polska. O tytuł mistrza Polski 1920–2000 (in Polish). GiA, Katowice. ISBN 83-88232-02-9.
- Gowarzewski, Andrzej (1994). Encyklopedia Piłkarska Fuji. 75 lat PZPN. Księga jubileuszowa (in Polish). GiA, Katowice. ISBN 83-902751-1-2.
- Gowarzewski, Andrzej (2000). Encyklopedia Piłkarska Fuji. Album 80 lat PZPN (in Polish). GiA, Katowice.
- Gowarzewski, Andrzej (2010). Encyklopedia Piłkarska Fuji. Album 90 lat PZPN (in Polish). GiA, Katowice.
