= Tadeusz Świcarz =

Polish footballer and ice hockey player

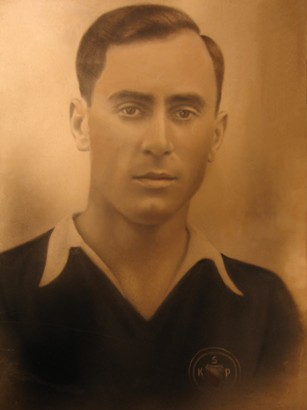

Personal information
- Full name: Tadeusz Józef Świcarz
- Date of birth: 5 June 1920
- Place of birth: Warsaw, Poland
- Date of death: 6 June 2002 (aged 82)
- Place of death: Warsaw, Poland
- Height: 1.74 m (5 ft 9 in)
- Position: Forward

Youth career
- 1930–1937: Skra Warsaw
- 1937–1939: Ursus Warsaw

Senior career*
Years	Team	Apps	(Gls)
1945–1949	Polonia Warsaw		
1950–1951	Legia Warsaw		
1951	Śląsk Wrocław		
1951–1952	Lotnik Warsaw		
1953	Legia Warsaw		

International career
1947–1949	Poland	5	(0)
Ice hockey career
- Weight: 72 kg (159 lb; 11 st 5 lb)
- Position: Forward
- Played for: Polonia Warsaw; Legia Warsaw; Gwardia Bydgoszcz; Znicz Pruszków
- National team: Poland
- Playing career: 1945–1956
- * Club domestic league appearances and goals

Tadeusz Józef Świcarz (5 June 1920 — 6 June 2002) was a Polish ice hockey and football player. In ice hockey he played for Polonia Warsaw, Legia Warsaw, Gwardia Bydgoszcz, and Znicz Pruszków. He played for the Poland national team at the 1952 Winter Olympics. Świcarz took part in the Warsaw Uprising in 1944, and was captured and held prisoner.

== Honours ==
Polonia Warsaw

- Polish Football Championship: 1946
