= Paweł Kowalski =

Polish footballer (1937–2016)

Personal information
- Date of birth: 10 February 1937
- Place of birth: Pabianice, Poland
- Date of death: 3 June 2016 (aged 79)
- Place of death: Łódź, Poland
- Height: 1.75 m (5 ft 9 in)
- Position: Defender

Senior career*
| Years | Team | Apps | (Gls) |
| 1950–1955 | PTC Pabianice | | |
| 1955–1958 | Pafawag Wrocław | | |
| 1958–1960 | Śląsk Wrocław | | |
| 1960 | PTC Pabianice | | |
| 1960–1971 | ŁKS Łódź | | |
- Chicago Eagles
- Polonia Toronto

International career
| 1967 | Poland | 4 | (0) |

Managerial career
- 1972: ŁKS Łódź
- 1975: Metal Kluczbork
- Polonia Toronto
- 1976–1977: Widzew Łódź
- 1978–1979: ROW Rybnik
- 1979–1981: Radomiak Radom
- 1982–1985: Boruta Zgierz
- 1985–1987: Polonia Bytom
- 1987–1989: Motor Lublin
- 1989–1992: Widzew Łódź
- 1992–1993: Olimpia Poznań
- 1994: Polonia Bytom
- 1994–1997: MKS Myszków
- 1997: Zagłębie Lubin
- 1998: Polonia/Szombierki Bytom
- 1998–1999: Polonia Bytom
- 2000: GKS Katowice
- 2000–2001: MKS Myszków
- 2001–2002: Górnik Łęczna
- 2003: Podbeskidzie Bielsko-Biała
- 2003–2004: Aluminium Konin
- 2004–2005: Pelikan Łowicz
- 2005: HEKO Czermno
- 2005–2006: Sokół Aleksandrów Łódzki
- * Club domestic league appearances and goals

Paweł Kowalski (10 February 1937 – 3 June 2016) was a Polish football manager and player who played as a defender.

He made four appearances for the Poland national team in 1967.

== Honours ==
=== Manager ===
Polonia Bytom

- II liga, group I: 1985–86
