= Mariusz Kuras =

Polish footballer

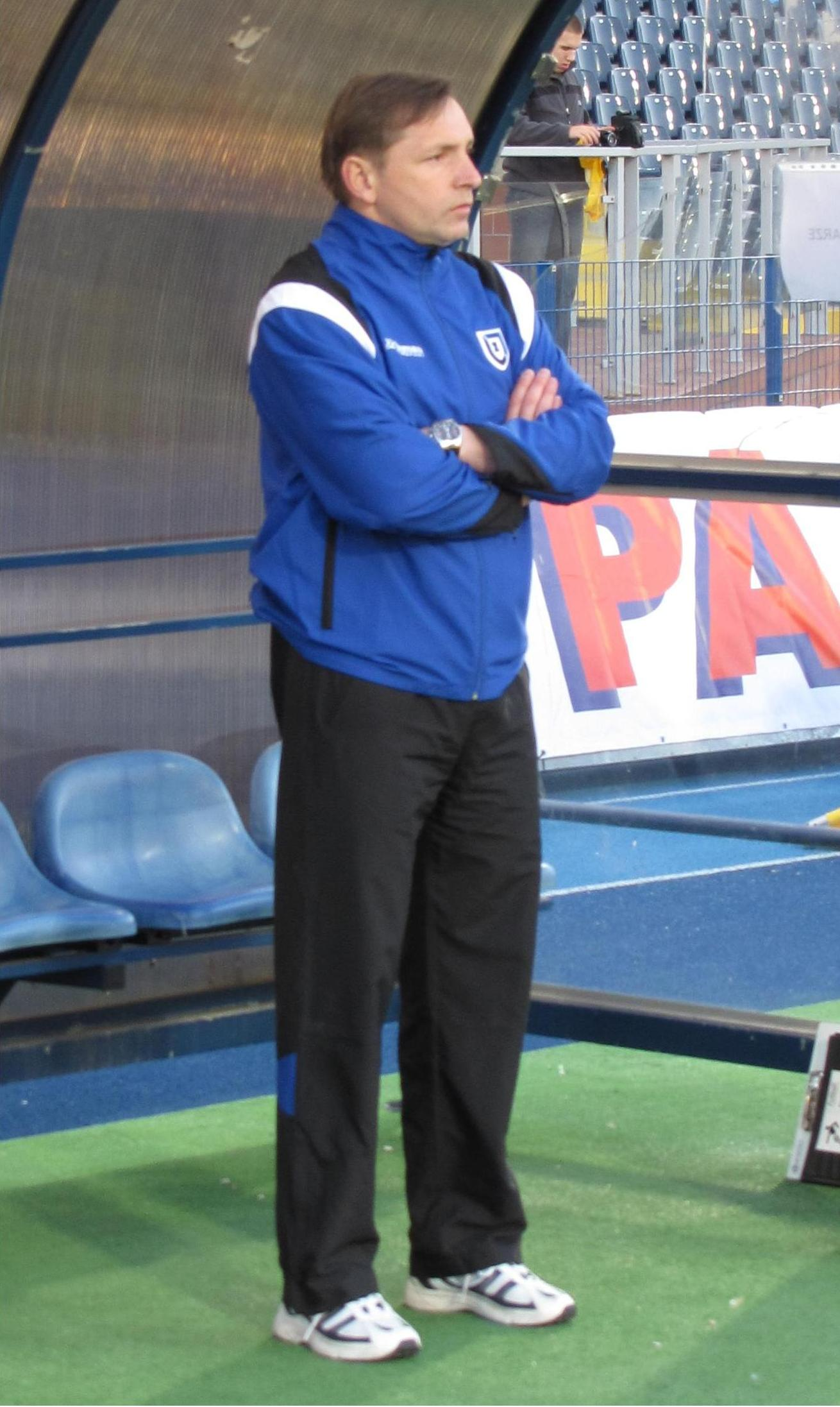
- Kuras with Zawisza Bydgoszcz

Personal information
- Full name: Mariusz Czesław Kuras
- Date of birth: 21 August 1965 (age 61)
- Place of birth: Częstochowa, Poland
- Height: 1.75 m (5 ft 9 in)
- Position: Midfielder

Team information
- Current team: GKS Kołbacz (manager)

Senior career*
Years	Team	Apps	(Gls)
–1983	Raków Częstochowa		
1983–1995	Pogoń Szczecin	264+	(5+)
1995–1996	Maccabi Jaffa	11	(0)
1996	Shimshon Tel Aviv		
1996–1999	Pogoń Szczecin	46+	(0+)
2007	Pogoń Szczecin Nowa		

International career
- Poland U18

Managerial career
- 2000: Pogoń Szczecin
- 2001–2002: Pogoń Szczecin
- 2002–2005: GKS Bełchatów
- 2005–2006: Radomiak Radom
- 2006: Pogoń Szczecin Nowa (player-manager)
- 2007: Stilon Gorzów Wielkopolski
- 2007: Odra Wodzisław Śląski
- 2007–2008: Pogoń Szczecin
- 2009–2010: Zawisza Bydgoszcz
- 2010: Kotwica Kołobrzeg
- 2010–2011: Sandecja Nowy Sącz
- 2012–2014: Ina Goleniów
- 2014–2015: Energetyk Gryfino
- 2021: Żaki Szczecin
- 2022: Świt Skolwin
- 2024–: GKS Kołbacz
Medal record
Men's football
Representing Poland
UEFA European Under-18 Championship
Third place	1984 Soviet Union
- * Club domestic league appearances and goals

Mariusz Kuras (born 21 August 1965) is a Polish professional football manager and former player who played as a midfielder. He is currently in charge of GKS Kołbacz.

== Honours ==
Poland U18

- UEFA European Under-18 Championship third place: 1984
