= Igor Arsenijević =

Serbian footballer

Personal information
- Full name: Igor Arsenijević
- Date of birth: 29 May 1986 (age 40)
- Place of birth: Belgrade, SFR Yugoslavia
- Height: 1.76 m (5 ft 9 in)
- Position: Midfielder

Team information
- Current team: Lunds BK (assistant)

Senior career*
| Years | Team | Apps | (Gls) |
| 2009–2013 | Bokelj | | |
| 2013–2014 | Mornar | 42 | (1) |
| 2015–2019 | Landskrona | 107 | (0) |
| 2020 | IFK Malmö | 13 | (1) |

Managerial career
- 2021–2025: Lunds BK (assistant)
- 2026–: Lunds BK
- * Club domestic league appearances and goals

Igor Arsenijević (Serbian Cyrillic: Игор Арсенијевић; born 29 May 1986 in Belgrade) is a Serbian retired football player and current assistant coach of Lunds BK.

== Career ==
=== Club career ===
On 2 February 2020, Swedish second division club IFK Malmö confirmed, that Arsenijević had joined the club on a free transfer.

At the end of the year, Arsenijević decided to retire and was hired as an assistant coach at Lunds BK.

== External sources ==
- Igor Arsenijević at Elite Football
- Igor Arsenijević at Soccerway.com
- Igor Arsenijević at FBref.com
