= Andrzej Prawda =

Polish football manager (1951–2020)

Personal information
- Date of birth: 10 July 1951
- Place of birth: Gdańsk, Poland
- Date of death: 8 November 2020 (aged 69)
- Position: Striker

Senior career*
Years	Team	Apps	(Gls)
- Kujawiak Włocławek

Managerial career
- 2003–2004: Victoria Sulejówek
- 2004: Pilica Białobrzegi
- 2004–2005: Mazowsze Grójec
- 2005: KS Łomianki
- 2005–2006: Victoria Sulejówek
- 2006: Świt Nowy Dwór Mazowiecki
- 2006: Świt Nowy Dwór Mazowiecki (assistant)
- 2006: Victoria Sulejówek
- 2007–2008: Odra Opole
- 2008: Odra Opole
- 2009: Victoria Chrościce
- 2009–2010: Mazur Karczew
- 2010–2011: Korona Góra Kalwaria
- 2011–2012: Bug Wyszków
- 2012–2013: Huragan Wołomin
- 2014–2015: Mazowsze Grójec
- 2015–2016: Huragan Wołomin
- ?: Józefovia Józefów
- 2016: Znicz Pruszków
- 2017–2018: Znicz Pruszków (youth)
- 2017: Znicz Pruszków (caretaker)
- 2018–2019: Znicz Pruszków
- * Club domestic league appearances and goals

Andrzej Prawda (10 July 1951 – 13 November 2020) was a Polish football manager.

On November 13, 2020, Prawda's friend Jerzy Engel announced that he had died from COVID-19 during the COVID-19 pandemic in Poland.
