= Pogoń Szczecin =

Polish association football club

- Full name: Pogoń Szczecin Spółka Akcyjna
- Nicknames: Portowcy (The Dockers); Duma Pomorza (Pride of Pomerania)
- Founded: 21 April 1948; 78 years ago
- Stadium: Stadion Miejski im. Floriana Krygiera
- Capacity: 21,163
- President: Vahid "Alex" Haditaghi
- Head coach: Óscar García
- League: Ekstraklasa
- 2025–26: Ekstraklasa, 9th of 18
- Website: www.pogonszczecin.pl
Home colours	Away colours	Third colours

Pogoń Szczecin Spółka Akcyjna (lit. 'Pogoń Szczecin Joint Stock Company'), commonly referred to as Pogoń Szczecin (Polish pronunciation: [ˌɛmkaˈɛs ˌpɔɡɔj̃ ˈʂtʂɛtɕin]), is a Polish professional football club based in Szczecin, West Pomeranian Voivodeship, which plays in the Ekstraklasa.

== History ==
The club was founded by Poles from Lwów (now Lviv, Ukraine), who had been transferred west after the Soviet annexation of Poland's eastern territories in 1945. The founders of Pogoń Szczecin had previously been supporters of Pogoń Lwów and the colors of their new club reflect their old club. Polonia Bytom and Odra Opole were likewise founded or revived by the former inhabitants of Lwów.

The most popular sports organization in Szczecin was founded on 21 April 1948 as Klub Sportowy Sztorm. Its first departments were football and boxing, and the football team began playing in the local C-Klasa. In March 1949, several sports clubs in Szczecin (KS Sztorm, KS Cukrownik, KS Drukarz, Pocztowy KS) were merged into a large organization called Klub Sportowy Zwiazkowiec. The team of Zwiazkowiec joined local A-Class league, replacing Pocztowy KS. In November 1950, Zwiazkowiec was dissolved, and a new organization, Klub Sportowy Kolejarz Szczecin was formed. Its football team, supported by the Port of Szczecin, in 1953 was promoted to the newly created Interregional League (Liga Międzywojewódzka), which covered the provinces of Szczecin, Zielona Góra and Poznań.

In autumn 1955, Kolejarz was renamed into Pogoń Szczecin. The name and the hues of the club are a continuation of Pogoń Lwów. In 1957, Pogoń was runner up of the Interregional League, qualifying to the second division playoffs. After beating Flota Gdynia, Kujawiak Włocławek and Warta Gorzów, Pogoń for the first time won promotion to the second level of Polish football system. In 1958, Pogoń was the winner of Group North of the Second Division (37 points, goals 54–22, not a single game lost), winning promotion to the Ekstraklasa.

In its top level debut, Pogoń lost at home to Gwardia Warszawa 0–1. In 1960, Pogoń was relegated from the Ekstraklasa, to return there in 1962.

For most of the 1960s and 1970s, Pogoń remained in the top Polish league, but remained an average team, without any successes. This changed in the early 1980s: in 1981, Pogoń advanced to the final of the Polish Cup, to lose 0–1 to Legia Warsaw. In 1982, Pogoń again made it to the Polish Cup final, to lose 0–1 to Lech Poznań.

In 1984 Pogoń, managed by Eugeniusz Ksol, for the first time in history was among top three teams in the Ekstraklasa, which meant that the team qualified for the UEFA Cup. In its European debut, Pogoń faced 1. FC Köln, with such stars as Harald Schumacher, Pierre Littbarski and Klaus Allofs. In the first leg (September 19, 1984 in Cologne), Pogoń lost 1–2. In the second leg (October 3), Polish team lost 0–1, after its players failed to score on two penalty kicks.

In 1987, Pogoń was Polish runner-up. Managed by Leszek Jezierski, the team played offensively, scoring plenty of goals. With such players as Mariusz Kuras, Marek Ostrowski and Marek Leśniak, Pogoń was only behind Górnik Zabrze. In the first round of UEFA Cup, Pogon faced Hellas Verona, with Thomas Berthold and Preben Elkjær. In the first leg (September 16, 1987), Pogoń tied at home 1–1. Two weeks later, Polish team lost in Italy 1–3.

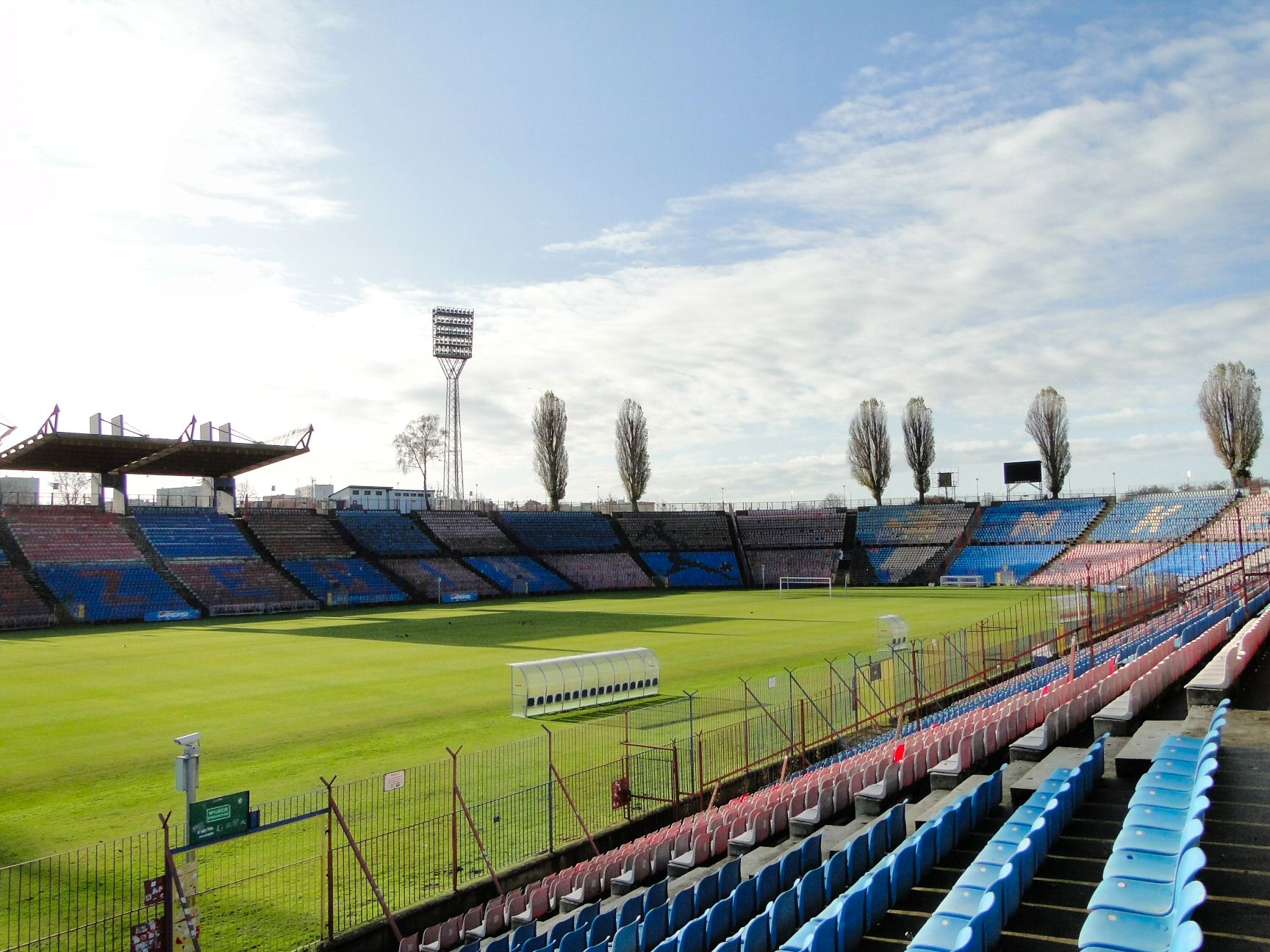
Ground: Stadion Miejski im. Floriana Krygiera, 2009

Pogoń in 2002 was on the brink of bankruptcy. As a result, fans created a new team on the basis of the reserves in the fourth division. However owner of Piotrcovia Piotrków Trybunalski Antoni Ptak decided to move the team and renamed the club MKS Pogoń Szczecin. The initial distrust was lost when the team performed well and used local players, however halfway through the 2005–06 season the team started underperforming and Ptak decided to replace almost the entire squad with only Brazilian nationals, making it the "most Brazilian team outside Brazil". Antoni Ptak also built a small training facility in Gutów Mały, meaning the home games were played almost 500 km (311 mi) away from Szczecin. The experiment failed and in 2007 Antoni Ptak moved away from football, leaving the club to be rebuilt on the basis of the 4th division counterpart set up originally by the fans, which acted as the reserve team in the meantime.

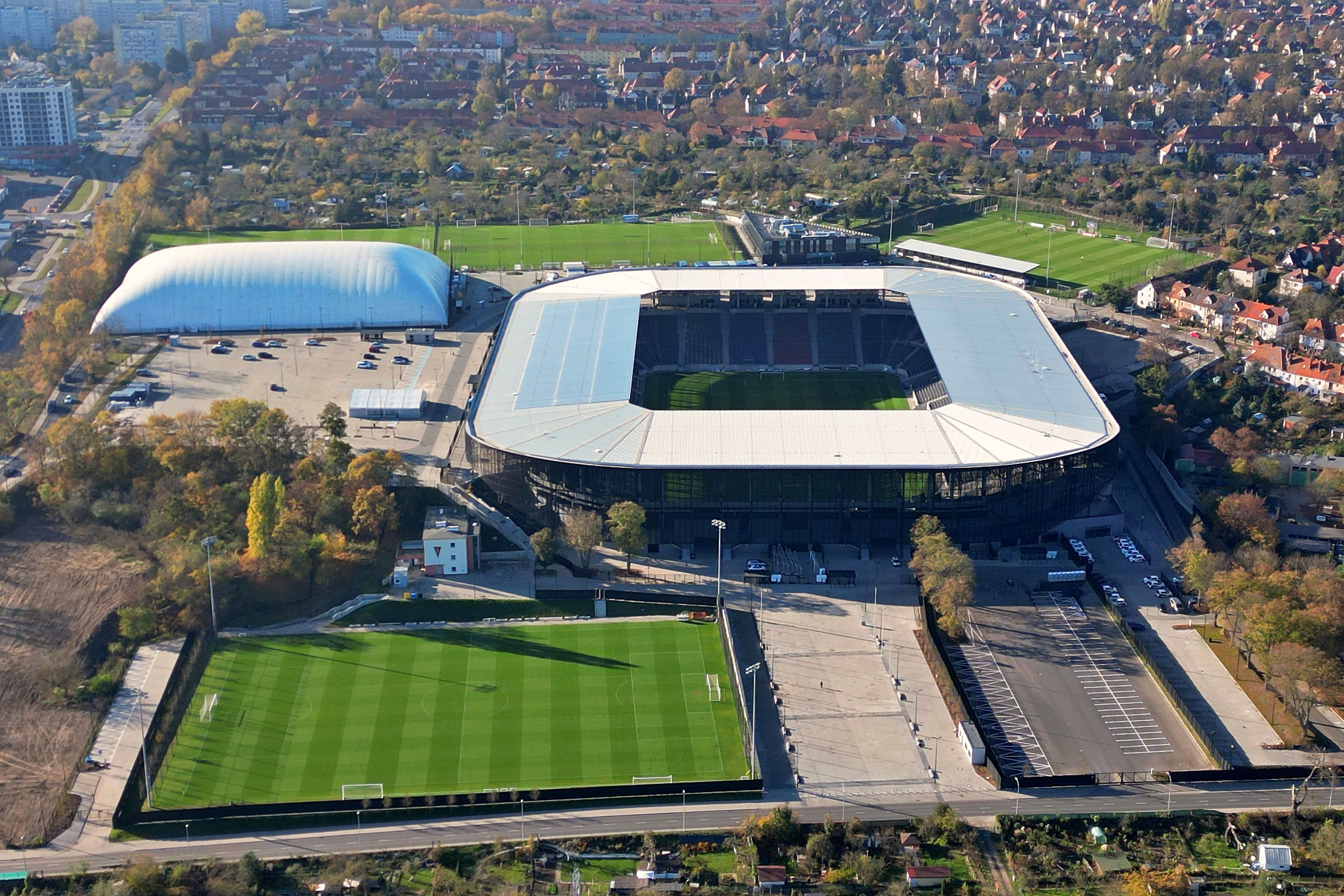
Ground: Stadion Miejski im. Floriana Krygiera, 2022

The club was promoted to the Zachodnia (Western) group of the new II Liga (formerly the Third League) for the 2007–08 season. The club earned promotion to the Polish First League after finishing 2nd in Western Group of Polish Second League in 2008–09 season. Despite playing on the second tier, Pogoń performed well in the 2009–10 Polish Cup, defeating top division teams Polonia Warsaw, Piast Gliwice and Ruch Chorzów to reach the final, to lose 0–1 to Jagiellonia Białystok. Finally Pogoń returned to the top division after finishing the First League as runner-up in the 2011–12 season.

Since then, Pogoń has promoted a number of players to the Poland national team and transferred several players to stronger leagues, including Sebastian Walukiewicz to Serie A side Cagliari Calcio and Kacper Kozłowski to Premier League side Brighton & Hove Albion F.C. While still a Pogoń player, Kozłowski, aged 17 years and 246 days, became the youngest-ever player to play at the European Championship, when he capped for Poland against Spain in June 2021 - this record was later broken by Lamine Yamal against Croatia at UEFA Euro 2024. From 2020, Pogoń re-established itself as one of the top teams in the country, finishing third in the league twice in a row (2020–21, 2021–22), and then fourth thrice in a row (2022–23, 2023–24, 2024–25), and reaching the Polish Cup final twice in a row (2023–24, 2024–25).

== Crest and colours ==
Szczecin city coat of arms from which the griffin in Pogoń's crest was derived

The club's colours are navy blue and maroon. Incorporated into the club's crest, they are derived from Pogoń Lwów, from which Pogoń Szczecin also took its name. The crowned griffin in the crest comes from the coat of arms of the city of Szczecin. Additionally, the crest contains the name "Pogoń" and the year of the club's foundation, i.e. 1948.

The club mascot Gryfus is a red crowned griffin, also derived from the coat of arms of Szczecin.

== Honours ==
=== Domestic ===
- Ekstraklasa
  - Runners-up: 1986–87, 2000–01
  - Third place: 1983–84, 2020–21, 2021–22
- Polish Cup
  - Runners-up: 1980–81, 1981–82, 2009–10, 2023–24, 2024–25

=== International ===
- UEFA Cup
  - First round: 1984–85, 1987–88
  - Qualifying round: 2001–02
- UEFA Intertoto Cup
  - Second round: 2005

=== Youth teams ===
- Polish U-19 Championship:
  - Champions: 1986, 2021
  - Runners-up: 1965, 2016, 2017
  - Third place: 1960, 2008, 2012, 2014
- Polish U-17 Championship:
  - Third place: 2002

== League history ==
Tier	Seasons	First	Last	Promotions	Relegations	Most consecutive seasons
Ekstraklasa (tier 1)	53	1959	2025–26	▲8 times to Europe	▼7	14 (2012–2026)
Second tier	14	1958	2011–12	▲8	never	3 (1989–1992; 2009–2012)
Third tier	10	1949	2008–09	▲2	never	9 (1949–1957)
Fourth tier	2	1948	2007–08	▲2	never	1

== Pogoń in European competition ==
Season	Competition	Round	Opponent	Home	Away	Aggregate
1965–66	Intertoto Cup	GR	(East Germany) BSG Chemie Leipzig	1–3	0–1	4th
1965–66	Intertoto Cup	GR	(Czechoslovakia) Slovnaft Bratislava	2–3	0–4	4th
1965–66	Intertoto Cup	GR	(Socialist Federal Republic of Yugoslavia) NK Zagreb	3–0	0–2	4th
1976	Intertoto Cup	GR	(Sweden) Östers IF	0–1	0–1	3rd
1976	Intertoto Cup	GR	(Portugal) Belenenses	2–2	0–2	3rd
1976	Intertoto Cup	GR	(Denmark) Næstved	3–0	1–1	3rd
1977	Intertoto Cup	GR	(Austria) Sturm Graz	1–0	0–0	1st
1977	Intertoto Cup	GR	(Denmark) KB	2–2	1–1	1st
1977	Intertoto Cup	GR	(Switzerland) Chênois	6–1	1–0	1st
1982	Intertoto Cup	GR	(Sweden) Brage	1–0	0–2	2nd
1982	Intertoto Cup	GR	(Czechoslovakia) Sparta Prague	2–0	0–1	2nd
1982	Intertoto Cup	GR	(Austria) Wiener Sport-Club	3–3	4–3	2nd
1983	Intertoto Cup	GR	(West Germany) Werder Bremen	2–1	0–4	1st
1983	Intertoto Cup	GR	(Sweden) Malmö FF	2–0	1–2	1st
1983	Intertoto Cup	GR	(Switzerland) St. Gallen	1–1	3–3	1st
1984–85	UEFA Cup	1R	(West Germany) FC Köln	0–1	1–2	1–3
1987	Intertoto Cup	GR	(Sweden) Hammarby	3–0	3–2	1st
1987	Intertoto Cup	GR	(Switzerland) La Chaux-de-Fonds	6–3	4–0	1st
1987	Intertoto Cup	GR	(East Germany) Magdeburg	3–1	1–2	1st
1987–88	UEFA Cup	1R	(Italy) Hellas Verona	1–1	1–3	2–4
1988	Intertoto Cup	GR	(Switzerland) Grasshopper Club	0–0	0–1	3rd
1988	Intertoto Cup	GR	(Sweden) Östers IF	2–0	0–0	3rd
1988	Intertoto Cup	GR	(Hungary) Pécsi MFC	0–0	1–3	3rd
1993	Intertoto Cup	GR	(Switzerland) Lausanne-Sport	0–4		4th
1993	Intertoto Cup	GR	(Sweden) IFK Norrköping		1–4	4th
1993	Intertoto Cup	GR	(Denmark) Copenhagen	4–1		4th
1993	Intertoto Cup	GR	Austria Wien		0–2	4th
1995	UEFA Intertoto Cup	GR	(France) Cannes	1–2		5th
1995	UEFA Intertoto Cup	GR	(Romania) Farul Constanța		1–2	5th
1995	UEFA Intertoto Cup	GR	(Belarus) Dnepr Mogilev	3–3		5th
1995	UEFA Intertoto Cup	GR	(Federal Republic of Yugoslavia) Bečej		1–2	5th
2001–02	UEFA Cup	QR	(Iceland) Fylkir	1–1	1–2	2–3
2005	UEFA Intertoto Cup	1R	(Moldova) Tiligul Tiraspol	6–2	3–0	9–2
2005	UEFA Intertoto Cup	2R	(Czech Republic) Sigma Olomouc	0–0	0–1	0–1
2021–22	UEFA Europa Conference League	2QR	(Croatia) Osijek	0–0	0–1	0–1
2022–23	UEFA Europa Conference League	1QR	(Iceland) KR	4–1	0–1	4–2
2022–23	UEFA Europa Conference League	2QR	(Denmark) Brøndby	1–1	0–4	1–5
2023–24	UEFA Europa Conference League	2QR	(Northern Ireland) Linfield	3−2	5–2	8–4
2023–24	UEFA Europa Conference League	3QR	(Belgium) Gent	2–1	0–5	2–6

== Players ==
=== Current squad ===
As of 18 September 2026

Note: Flags indicate national team as defined under FIFA eligibility rules; some limited exceptions apply. Players may hold more than one non-FIFA nationality.

No.	Pos.	Nation	Player
3	MF	USA	Kellyn Acosta
4	DF	ITA	Alessandro Pio Riccio
6	MF	POL	Jan Biegański
7	FW	GAM	Musa Juwara
9	FW	HUN	Rajmund Molnár
10	FW	BIH	Filip Čuić
11	MF	POL	Kamil Grosicki (captain)
13	DF	GRE	Dimitrios Keramitsis
15	DF	IRQ	Hussein Ali
16	MF	POL	Patryk Dziczek
17	FW	CMR	Jean-Pierre Nsame
18	FW	NGR	Paul Mukairu
19	MF	SEN	Mor Ndiaye
20	DF	GER	Isaiah Eichie
21	MF	MKD	Darko Churlinov
22	FW	ESP	Jordi Sánchez

No.	Pos.	Nation	Player
23	DF	FRA	Benjamin Mendy
28	DF	SWE	Linus Wahlqvist
29	DF	BEL	Lukas Willen
30	FW	POL	Jacek Czapliński
31	GK	GRE	Nikolaos Botis
35	MF	POL	Maciej Wojciechowski
41	DF	HUN	Attila Szalai
42	FW	POL	Patryk Paryzek
47	MF	POL	Natan Ława
75	DF	POL	Andrzej Ossowski
77	GK	ROU	Valentin Cojocaru
88	MF	ESP	José Ángel Pozo
89	GK	POL	Antoni Fojut
98	GK	POL	Kevin Dąbrowski
—	GK	POL	Hubert Renka

=== Out on loan ===
Note: Flags indicate national team as defined under FIFA eligibility rules; some limited exceptions apply. Players may hold more than one non-FIFA nationality.

No.	Pos.	Nation	Player
25	FW	DEN	Mads Agger (at BK Häcken until 31 December 2026)
38	DF	POL	Rafał Jakubowski (at Chełmianka Chełm until 30 June 2027)

=== Retired numbers ===
Note: Flags indicate national team as defined under FIFA eligibility rules; some limited exceptions apply. Players may hold more than one non-FIFA nationality.

No.	Pos.	Nation	Player
5	FW	BRA	Andradina (2005–07, 2011–13)
78	MF	POL	Olgierd Moskalewicz (1991–98, 2003–04, 2009–10)

=== Former notable players ===
Had international caps for their respective countries at any time.

- (Armenia) Vahan Bichakhchyan
- (Bosnia and Herzegovina) Admir Adžem
- (Bosnia and Herzegovina) Zvonimir Kožulj
- (Bosnia and Herzegovina) Edin Šaranović
- (Brazil) Amaral
- (Bulgaria) Spas Delev
- (Cameroon) Hervé Tchami
- (Denmark) Morten Rasmussen
- (Estonia) Sergei Mošnikov
- (Finland) Santeri Hostikka
- (Georgia (country)) Lasha Dvali
- (Georgia (country)) Vladimir Dvalishvili
- (Georgia (country)) Mate Tsintsadze
- (Greece) Efthymis Koulouris
- (Greece) Leonardo Koutris
- (Greece) Michalis Manias
- (Hungary) Ádám Gyurcsó
- (Indonesia) Otávio Dutra
- (Latvia) Vladimirs Kamess
- (Norway) Fredrik Ulvestad
- (Palestine) Omar Jarun
- (Poland) Dariusz Adamczuk
- (Poland) Jacek Bednarz
- (Poland) Adrian Benedyczak
- (Poland) Czesław Boguszewicz
- (Poland) Grzegorz Bonin
- (Poland) Adrian Budka
- (Poland) Adam Buksa
- (Poland) Piotr Celeban
- (Poland) Jacek Chańko
- (Poland) Damian Dąbrowski
- (Poland) Paweł Drumlak
- (Poland) Waldemar Folbrycht
- (Poland) Dariusz Fornalak
- (Poland) Dariusz Gęsior
- (Poland) Wojciech Golla
- (Poland) Rafal Grzelak
- (Poland) Grzegorz Kaliciak
- (Poland) Zenon Kasztelan
- (Poland) Przemysław Kaźmierczak
- (Poland) Adam Kensy
- (Poland) Marian Kielec
- (Poland) Robert Kolendowicz
- (Poland) Kacper Kozłowski
- (Poland) Michał Kucharczyk
- (Poland) Rafał Kurzawa
- (Poland) Waldemar Jaskulski
- (Poland) Marek Leśniak
- (Poland) Tomasz Lisowski
- (Poland) Mateusz Łęgowski
- (Poland) Paweł Magdoń
- (Poland) Radosław Majdan
- (Poland) Radosław Majewski
- (Poland) Patryk Małecki
- (Poland) Ryszard Mańko
- (Poland) Grzegorz Mielcarski
- (Poland) Olgierd Moskalewicz
- (Poland) Rafał Murawski
- (Poland) Marek Ostrowski
- (Poland) Jakub Piotrowski
- (Poland) Jerzy Podbrożny
- (Poland) Marcin Robak
- (Poland) Paweł Skrzypek
- (Poland) Jakub Słowik
- (Poland) Kazimierz Sokołowski
- (Poland) Maciej Stolarczyk
- (Poland) Marek Szczech
- (Poland) Dariusz Szubert
- (Poland) Maciej Terlecki
- (Poland) Łukasz Trałka
- (Poland) Krzysztof Urbanowicz
- (Poland) Sebastian Walukiewicz
- (Poland) Henryk Wawrowski
- (Poland) Kazimierz Węgrzyn
- (Poland) Bogusław Wyparło
- (Poland) Łukasz Załuska
- (Poland) Michał Żyro
- (Romania) Cornel Râpă
- (South Africa) Ricardo Nunes
- (Russia) Oleg Salenko
- (Slovakia) Dušan Perniš
- (Slovenia) Luka Zahović
- (Sweden) Stefan Jansson
- (Trinidad and Tobago) Mekeil Williams
- (Zimbabwe) Dickson Choto
- (Zimbabwe) Dzikamai Gwaze

== Coaches ==
- (Poland) Jan Dixa (1950)
- (Poland) Kazimierz Chrostek (1951–1952)
- (Poland) Zygmunt Czyżewski (1953)
- (Poland) Henryk Wielga (1954)
- (Poland) Michał Matyas (1955–1956)
- (Poland) Florian Krygier (1956–1958)
- (Poland) Edward Brzozowski (1959)
- (Poland) Florian Krygier (1960)
- (Poland) Edward Brzozowski (1960–1961)
- (Poland) Zygmunt Czyżewski (1962–1963)
- (Poland) Marian Suchogórski (1963–1965)
- (Poland) Stefan Żywotko (1965–1970)
- (Poland) Eugeniusz Ksol (1970)
- (Czechoslovakia) Karel Kosarz (1970–1972)
- (Poland) Edmund Zientara (1972–1975)
- (Poland) Bogusław Hajdas (1975–1977)
- (Poland) Aleksander Mandziara (1977–1978)
- (Poland) Hubert Fiałkowski (1978)
- (Poland) Konstanty Pawlikaniec (1979)
- (Poland) Jerzy Kopa (Oct 20, 1979 – June 30, 1982)
- (Poland) Eugeniusz Ksol (1982–1985)
- (Poland) Maciej Hejn (1985)
- (Poland) Leszek Jezierski (1985–1987)
- (Poland) Jan Jucha (1987–1988)
- (Poland) Jerzy Jatczak (1988)
- (Poland) Lesław Ćmikiewicz (July 1, 1988 – April 10, 1989)
- (Poland) Eugeniusz Ksol (1989)
- (Poland) Włodzimierz Obst (1989–1990)
- (Poland) Aleksander Brożyniak (1990)
- (Poland) Jerzy Jatczak (1990)
- (Poland) Eugeniusz Różański (1991–1992)
- (Poland) Leszek Jezierski (1992)
- (Poland) Roman Szukiełowicz (1992–1993)
- (Poland) Jerzy Kasalik (22 Dec 1993 – 31 Dec 1994)
- (Poland) Orest Lenczyk (1 Jan 1995 – 1 July 1995)
- (Poland) Janusz Pekowski (1995–1996)
- (Poland) Roman Szukiełowicz (1996–1997)
- (Poland) Bogusław Baniak (1 July 1997 – 7 April 1999)
- (Poland) Albin Mikulski (1 July 1999 – 16 April 2000)
- (Poland) Mariusz Kuras (17 April 2000 – 30 June 2000)
- (Poland) Edward Lorens (20 July 2000 – 29 April 2001)
- (Poland) Mariusz Kuras (29 April 2001 – 14 June 2002)
- (Poland) Albin Mikulski (14 June 2002 – 3 Sept 2002)
- (Poland) Jerzy Wyrobek (4 Sept 2002 – 1 July 2003)
- (Poland) Bogusław Baniak (1 July 2003 – 1 July 2004)
- (Czech Republic) Pavel Malura (1 July 2004 – 9 Aug 2004)
- (Czech Republic) Bohumil Páník (8 Oct 2004 – 18 April 2005)
- (Poland) Bogusław Pietrzak (11 May 2005 – 23 Aug 2005)
- (Czech Republic) Bohumil Páník (Aug 2005 – Feb 2006)
- (Brazil) José Carlos Serrão (15 Dec 2005 – 1 March 2006)
- (Czech Republic) Bohumil Páník (March 2006 – 17 April 2006)
- (Poland) Mariusz Kuras (18 April 2006 – 11 Dec 2006)
- (Czech Republic) Libor Pala (21 Dec 2006 – 21 March 2007)
- (Poland) Bogusław Baniak (21 March 2007 – 30 June 2007)
- (Poland) Marcin Kaczmarek (July 2007 – Dec 2007)
- (Poland) Mariusz Kuras (30 Dec 2007 – 15 Sept 2008)
- (Poland) Piotr Mandrysz (15 Sept 2008 – 17 Aug 2010)
- (Poland) Maciej Stolarczyk (17 Aug 2010 – 9 Nov 2010)
- (Poland) Artur Płatek (10 Nov 2010 – 30 June 2011)
- (Poland) Marcin Sasal (30 May 2011 – 10 April 2012)
- (Poland) Ryszard Tarasiewicz (10 April 2012 – 30 June 2012)
- (Poland) Artur Skowronek (1 July 2012 – 19 March 2013)
- (Poland) Dariusz Wdowczyk (20 March 2013 – 21 Oct 2014)
- (Slovakia) Ján Kocian (22 Oct 2014 – 8 April 2015)
- (Poland) Czesław Michniewicz (9 April 2015 – 30 June 2016)
- (Poland) Kazimierz Moskal (24 May 2016 – 30 June 2017)
- (Poland) Maciej Skorża (1 July 2017 – 30 Oct 2017)
- (Germany) Kosta Runjaić (30 Nov 2017 – 23 May 2022)
- (Sweden) Jens Gustafsson (1 July 2022 – 15 Aug 2024)
- (Poland) Robert Kolendowicz (15 August 2024 – 16 Sept 2025)
- (Poland) Tomasz Grzegorczyk (caretaker) (17 Sept 2025 – 30 Sept 2025)
- (Denmark) Thomas Thomasberg (30 Sept 2025 – 22 June 2026)
- (Spain) Óscar García (23 June 2026 – present)

== See also ==
- Pogoń Szczecin II (reserve team)
- Football in Poland
