= Jack Majgaard Jensen =

Danish football manager (born 1973)

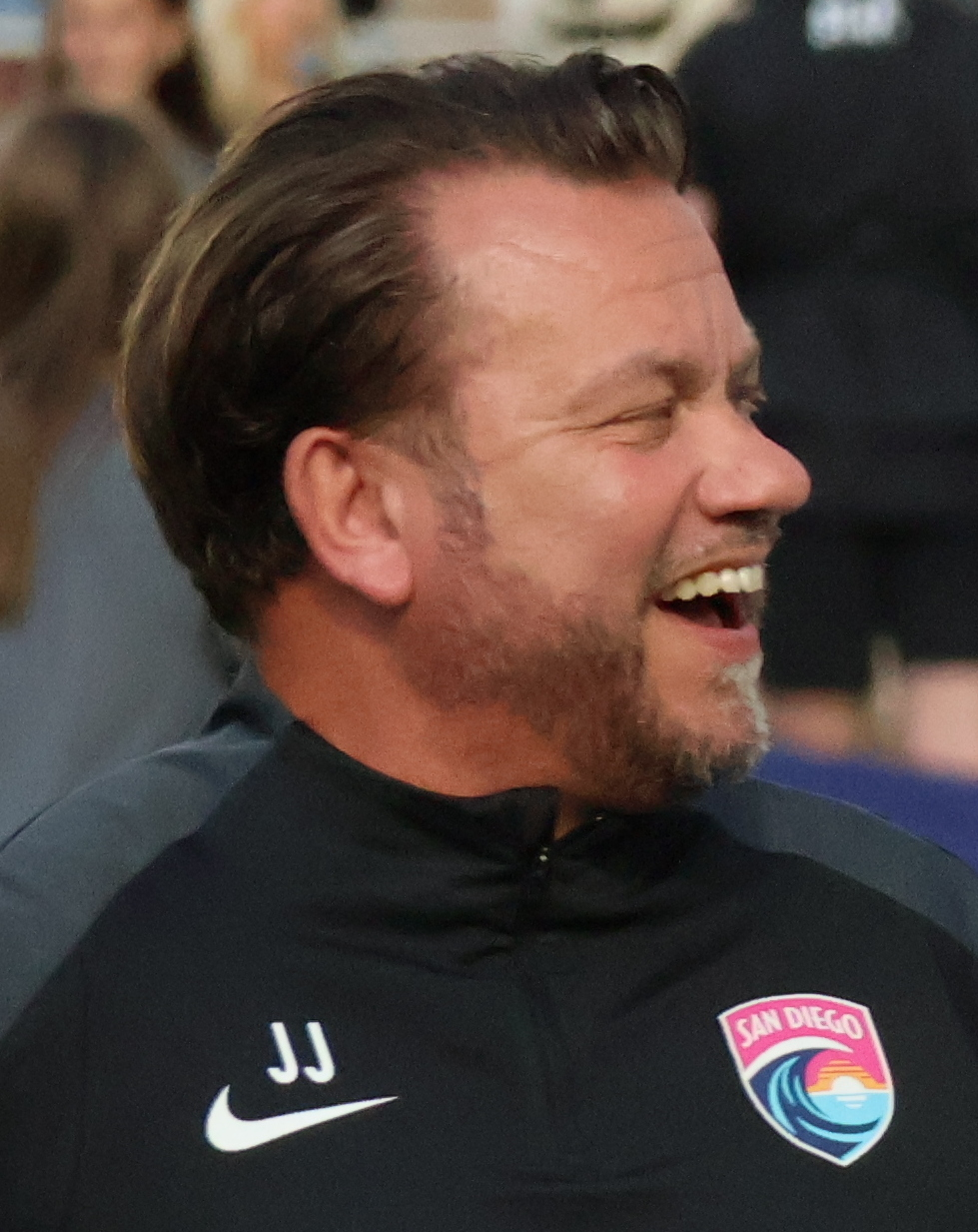
- Jensen with the San Diego Wave in 2025

Personal information
- Full name: Jack Majgaard Jensen
- Date of birth: 25 March 1973 (age 53)
- Place of birth: Denmark

Managerial career
- Years: Team
- 2001–2005: Malmö FF (U-20)
- 2006–2009: Lunds BK
- 2009–2013: Lyngby (assistant)
- 2013–2015: Lyngby
- 2015–2017: FC Rosengård (women)
- 2018: Landskrona BoIS
- 2019: Lunds BK
- 2019: Kristianstad FC
- 2019–2021: Vålerenga (women)
- 2021–2023: Roskilde
- 2024: Molde (women)
- 2024: Roskilde (interim)
- 2025: San Diego Wave (assistant)

Jack Majgaard Jensen (born 25 March 1973 is a Danish football manager who was most recently the assistant coach of San Diego Wave FC of the National Women's Soccer League (NWSL). He has previously managed Lunds BK, Lyngby BK, FC Rosengård (women), Landskrona BoIS, Kristianstad FC, Vålerenga (women), and FC Roskilde.
