= Dzikamai Gwaze =

Zimbabwean footballer (born 1989)

Personal information
- Full name: Dzikamai Andre Gwaze
- Date of birth: 22 April 1989 (age 37)
- Place of birth: Harare, Zimbabwe
- Height: 1.79 m (5 ft 10 1/2 in)
- Position: Right winger

Youth career
- –2008: Darryn Textiles

Senior career*
Years	Team	Apps	(Gls)
2008–2009	Darryn Textiles		
2009	KS Wisła		
2009–2010	LZS Piotrówka		
2010–2011	Pogoń Szczecin	5	(1)
2012–2014	LZS Piotrówka	28	(14)
2014–2015	Górnik Zabrze	23	(1)
2014–2016	Górnik Zabrze II	28	(6)
2016–2017	LZS Piotrówka		
2017–2019	Piast Strzelce Opolskie		
2019–2021	LZS Piotrówka	63	(26)

International career
2016	Zimbabwe	1	(0)
- * Club domestic league appearances and goals

Dzikamai Gwaze (born 22 April 1989) is a Zimbabwean former professional footballer who played as a right winger.

== Career ==
=== International ===
Gwaze made his debut for the Zimbabwe national football team in a friendly 2–0 win over Uganda.
