= Stefan Jansson =

Swedish footballer (born 1970)

Personal information
- Full name: Bo Stefan Jansson
- Date of birth: 20 May 1970 (age 56)
- Place of birth: Sweden
- Height: 1.68 m (5 ft 6 in)
- Position: Midfielder

Senior career*
Years	Team	Apps	(Gls)
–1988	Köpings IS		
1988–1991	Västerås SK		
1992	IK Westmannia		
1992–1993	Pogoń Szczecin	1	(0)
1993–1994	IFK Hässleholm		
1995	Djurgården	2	(0)
1996	Chengdu Tiancheng		
1997–1999	Nacka FF		
- * Club domestic league appearances and goals

Bo Stefan Jansson (born 20 May 1970) is a Swedish former professional footballer who played as a midfielder.

Jansson joined Djurgården from IFK Hässleholm for the 1995 Allsvenskan season, playing 2 Allsvenskan matches and scoring 0 goals during the season.
