= Jerzy Engel =

Polish footballer and coach

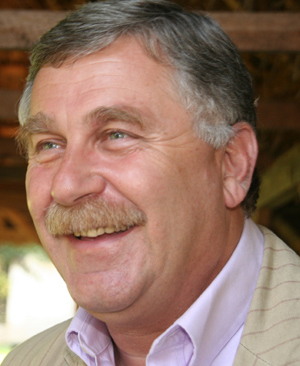
- Jerzy Engel

Personal information
- Full name: Władysław Jerzy Engel
- Date of birth: 6 October 1952 (age 74)
- Place of birth: Włocławek, Poland
- Positions: Midfielder; forward

Youth career
- 1966–1969: Junak Włocławek

Senior career*
| Years | Team | Apps | (Gls) |
| 1969–1971 | Kujawiak Włocławek | | |
| 1971–1973 | AZS-AWF Warsaw | | |
| 1973–1974 | Polonia Warsaw | | |

Managerial career
- 1975–1976: Polonia Warsaw II
- 1976–1977: Hutnik Warsaw
- 1977–1978: RKS Błonie
- 1978: Polonia Warsaw
- 1979–1981: Polonia Bydgoszcz
- 1982–1984: Hutnik Warsaw
- 1985–1987: Legia Warsaw
- 1988–1990: Apollon Limassol
- 1990–1991: APOP Paphos
- 1991–1995: Nea Salamis
- 1996: Nea Salamis
- 1997: Aris Limassol
- 1997–1999: Polonia Warsaw
- 2000–2002: Poland
- 2005: Wisła Kraków
- 2005–2006: APOEL
- * Club domestic league appearances and goals

Władysław Jerzy Engel (Polish pronunciation: [vwaˈdɨswaf ˈjɛʐɨ ˈɛŋɡɛl]; born 6 October 1952) is a Polish former football player and manager.

== Biography ==
=== Playing career ===
Engel began his career in football at an early age playing at local youth club Junak Włocławek, before being promoted to local senior team Kujawiak Włocławek, which allowed him to move to the likes of Polonia Warsaw and several other clubs.

Engel, nicknamed "Jurek", began playing in midfield or attack before, at the age of 22, being cruelly forced to cut his career short because of an injury.

=== Managerial career ===
==== First spells in club football ====
With spirits dampened only slightly, he immediately turned to coaching and took over at Polonia Warsaw's reserves in the 1975–76 season.

After a spell with third division teams, he came to the fore once more with his involvement in Poland's third-place finish in the 1982 FIFA World Cup Spain, helping then national coach, Antoni Piechniczek, choose the ideal squad.

In 1985, Engel took charge of Legia Warsaw, leading them to two second-place finishes in the Polish top division in three seasons. Just as he was becoming well known, he made the strange decision to move to Apollon Limassol, in Cyprus, an island he stayed on for seven years.

He later returned to Legia before taking Polonia Warsaw to a runners-up spot in the 1998–99 season.

==== National team spell ====
He became manager of the Poland national team in 1999. After failing to achieve qualification for the UEFA Euro 2000, was instrumental in securing Emmanuel Olisadebe's naturalisation as a Polish national.

With the side lacking firepower when he took charge, Engel saw the qualities in Nigerian-born Olisadebe who was already playing league football in Poland. He asked the president to speed Olisadebe's papers through and as a result, had a talented forward available for World Cup qualifying. Olisadebe rewarded his coach with eight goals in ten qualifying matches.

Engel steered Poland to their first World Cup finals tournament since 1986, when he oversaw their participation at the 2002 World Cup in South Korea and Japan.

The World Cup did not go well and Poland were eliminated in the first round. The opening two games provided two resounding defeats, losing to South Korea and Portugal. After being knocked out of the tournament and now without any pressure to perform, Poland beat the United States 3–1 in their final group game.

==== Second spell in club football ====
His most recent vocation was at Wisła Kraków where he was trainer until late-October 2005 and he has also been sports director of Legia Warsaw. In December 2005, he moved back in Cyprus and headed the coaching team of APOEL. He led the team into the third place of the Cypriot Championship, just two points from the top, and won the Cypriot Cup as well.

=== Directorial career ===
On 25 June 2015, "Polonia Warsaw Co." under the leadership of Jerzy Engel took over the senior team from the MKS Polonia Warsaw Academy, which helped to reinstate Polonia Warsaw back from nonexistence, to the bottom-half of the 4th tier (third league) of professional football in Poland. Under "Engel's Co." the club returned to the emblem from the Polish title winning season (1999–2000).

== Honours ==
=== Manager ===
Polonia Warsaw

- Ekstraklasa: 1999–2000

APOEL

- Cypriot Cup: 2005–06

Individual

- Polish Coach of the Year: 2000, 2001

== Personal life ==
He is the father of Jerzy Engel Jr. In November 2017, he and his son achieved a notable betting record at the Służewiec horse racing track, where together they won 140,000zł during the races, setting an all-time record for the venue.
