= Hutnik Warsaw =

Polish football club

Hutnik Warszawa
- Full name: Bielański Klub Sportowy; Hutnik Warszawa
- Nickname(s): Hutnicy (The Steelworkers)
- Founded: 21 April 1957; 68 years ago
- Ground: Marymoncka 42 Street
- Capacity: 8,000
- Chairman: Maciej Purchała
- Manager: Michał Piros
- League: IV liga Mazovia
- 2024–25: IV liga Mazovia, 5th of 18
- Website: http://www.hutnikwarszawa.pl/
Home colours	Away colours

Hutnik Warszawa, known in English as Hutnik Warsaw, is a Polish professional football club based in the Bielany district of Warsaw, Poland. It was founded on 21 April 1957 as Hutniczy Klub Sportowy (Steelworkers' Sports Club) and renamed Bielański Klub Sportowy (Bielany Sports Club) in 2001.

== History ==
Hutnik has never played in the top division, and the highest position it has achieved in the second-tier was a sixth-place finish in the 1992–93 season. The successes in the Polish Cup include reaching the quarterfinal in 1991, as well as winning the Cup on a regional level on 4 June 2008, after defeating Legia Warsaw II 1–0 in the final.

Despite not being the most successful of clubs in terms of trophy-winning, Hutnik has always been particularly active in developing young, mostly local, players; several former Hutnik players even went on to play for the Poland national team. Michał Żewłakow, previous captain of the national team, is a former Hutnik player.

Hutnik was traditionally sponsored by the nearby steel mill (Huta Warszawa) and the privatisation of that steelworks – and thus the ending of the sponsorship – marked the beginning of the club's steady decline. In the summer of 2012 Hutnik's disastrous financial condition finally resulted in dissolution of the club but the club was re-formed starting from the bottom of the league pyramid (8th level, known as B-Klasa).

== Managers ==
- Hubert Musiał (1959–61)
- Bolesław Popiołek (1961–62, 1967)
- Krzysztof Skrzypczak (1962–64)
- Czesław Wiśniewski (1964)
- Andrzej Strejlau (1964–65)
- Edward Brzozowski (1965–66, 1972–73)
- Stanisław Woźniak (1966–67)
- Longin Janeczek (1971)
- Józef Bartkowski
- Mikołaj Korzuń
- Andrzej Czyżowski
- R. Dobrakowski
- Bernard Blaut (1972)
- Henryk Grzybowski
- J. Grzelak
- Zygfryd Rogulski
- Andrzej Prawda
- Krzysztof Branicki (1975, 1978, 1991, 2003, 2007, 2012)
- Jerzy Engel (1976–77, 1982–85)
- W. Kamiński
- Janusz Wójcik (1978)
- Jerzy Masztaler (1979–82)
- Włodzimierz Małowiejski (1980)
- Marek Janota (1980–81)
- Zbigniew Wąsik
- Andrzej Zamilski (1986–87)
- Mieczysław Broniszewski (1991)
- Andrzej Wiśniewski (1991)
- Mieczysław Bicz (1991)
- Roman Jurczak (1992)
- Piotr Wiśnik (1993–98)
- Zbigniew Lepczyk (1994–95)
- Paweł Dawidczyński (1996)
- Ryszard Piętka (1997)
- Piotr Michalec
- Mariusz Sobczyk
- Bogusław Oblewski (2000–01, 2008–09)
- Dariusz Klamra (2002)
- Antoni Giedrys (2002–03)
- Kazimierz Buda (2003–04)
- Andrzej Sikorski
- Andrzej Blacha (2005–06)
- Hubert Dolewski (2006–07)
- Piotr Mosór (2007–08)
- Sławomir Włodarski (2008)
- Jan Karaś (2009)
- Łukasz Zezula (January 2010 – May 2012)
- Grzegorz Faberski (July 2012 – November 2014)
- Grzegorz Sitnicki (December 2014 – September 2015)
- Łukasz Choderski (September 2015 – June 2017)
- Bartłomiej Walewski (July 2017 – November 2022)
- Maciej Gadowski (December 2022 – October 2023)
- Marek Końko (October 2023 – 28 May 2024)
- Michael Chojnicki (interim) (28 May 2024 – 12 July 2024)
- Michał Piros (12 July 2024 – current)

Three of the former Hutnik managers, Strejlau, Wójcik and Engel, went on to manage the Poland national team, while Zamilski managed Polish youth national teams.

== Records ==
- Biggest win: 22–0 against WKS II Rząśnik (2012–13)
- Biggest defeat: 0–8 against MKS Mława (1963–64) and Warmia Grajewo (2002–03)
- Highest league position: 6th in II liga (1992–93)
- Lowest league position: 1st in Klasa B Warsaw I (2012–13)
- Most league games for the club: Mariusz Szymaniak (345 appearances, 1997–2009, 2012–14)
- Most league goals for the club: Mariusz Szymaniak (135 goals)
