= Lechia Gdańsk =

Polish football club

Coordinates: 54°22′4.59″N 18°37′15.79″E

- Full name: Klub Sportowy Lechia Gdańsk Spółka Akcyjna
- Nicknames: Biało-Zieloni (The White and Greens); Betony (Concrete); Budowlani (Construction Workers); Gdańskie Lwy (Gedanian Lions); Lechiści (Lechistas)
- Founded: 7 August 1945; 81 years ago
- Ground: Polsat Plus Arena Gdańsk
- Capacity: 41,620
- President: Paolo Urfer
- Manager: Vladyslav Lupashko
- League: I liga
- 2025–26: Ekstraklasa, 16th of 18 (relegated)
- Website: lechia.pl
Home colours	Away colours	Third colours

Lechia Gdańsk (Polish pronunciation: [ˈlɛxja ˈɡdaj̃sk]) is a Polish football club based in Gdańsk. As of the 2026–27 season, they compete in the I liga.

The club was founded in 1945 by people expelled from Lwów, who were supporters of Poland's oldest football team Lechia Lwów, founded in 1903. The club's name comes from Lechia, a poetic name for Poland, and is a continuation of the name used by the club based in Lwów. In their early years, Lechia enjoyed some success, most notably finishing third in the Polish top division, before spending decades in the second and third tiers. In the early 1980s, Lechia won the Polish Cup, the Polish Super Cup, and played in a European competition for the first time. After having two mergers with other teams in the 1990s the club had to restart from the sixth tier in 2001. In May 2008 the club was promoted again to the Ekstraklasa, with the club's most recent success coming in 2019, finishing third in the league and again winning both the Polish Cup and the Super Cup, before suffering relegation to I liga in 2023.

== History ==
=== Early years (1945–1948) ===
The club was founded on 7 August 1945 in Gdańsk and was originally named "BOP Baltia Gdańsk". The club was first established by the "Port Reconstruction Office" (Polish: Biuro Odbudowy Portów). The BOP's purpose was to help rebuild Polish sea ports which were destroyed during World War II, and saw it best to create a sports club for the BOP workers. BOP Baltia's first game came on 2 September 1945, in which they lost the game 6–4 against Milicyjny Klub Sportowy z Wrzeszcza (Militia Sports Club from Wrzeszcz) in a friendly. BOP Baltia's first league game was a week later and played against WKS 16 Dywizji (Military Sports Club of the 16th Division). Due to the disruption of football in Poland due to the war the first season back was focused on regional qualifying for leagues to reformat the Polish football leagues. In the Gdańsk regional qualifying Lechia won all 6 games including both games in their first Gdańsk Derby games against Gedania Gdańsk, winning the group and being promoted to the A Klasa (A Class, the second division in Poland at the time).

Towards the end of February 1946, BOP officials had a meeting, in which it was decided that the name of the club should be changed. The team became known as "Sports Club for the Port Reconstruction Office Lechia Gdańsk" (Polish: Klub Sportowy Biura Odbudowy Portów Lechia Gdańsk), 'Lechia' coming from Lechia Lwów, as a majority of the workers at BOP and those who studied at the Gdańsk University of Technology had been expelled from Lwów at the end of WW2.

Lechia fared well in its early years in the lower divisions finishing top of their district championships in both the 1946–47 and 1947–48 seasons. For Lechia to be promoted to the top division they needed to win additional qualifying rounds against the other district champions, playing a series of games in playoff games, before a final playoff league with four teams of five being promoted. In the playoffs for the 1946–47 season Lechia finished bottom of the playoff league, being the only team not to advance to the top division. Lechia's fortunes changed the following season however and achieved promotion at the end of the 1947–48 season when they finished top of the promotion playoffs league.

=== First years of top flight football (1949–1954) ===
In 1949 Lechia played in the top flight for the first time (at this time the top division was called the "I liga"). While it was a historic year for the club, and showed the competitiveness of the team in their early years to play in the top division, it was not a season to be enjoyed by Lechia in terms of on field performances, winning only 4 games all season and losing an incredible 15 times out of 22 games, finishing bottom of the league as a result. Due to suffering relegation in their first Ekstraklasa season the club found themselves back in the second tier of Polish football in 1950. Their first year in the II liga was a year of transition and the team initially struggled finishing 6th out of 10 teams, and finding themselves way off the pace for an immediate return to the top division. The league format of the II liga was changed for the 1951 season, where in the previous season the division was split into two groups with both winners being promoted, the 1951 season saw the II liga being split into four groups with the group winners playing each other in a mini playoff league with the top two being promoted to the Ekstraklasa. Lechia won their group which was the most diverse group at the time, playing against teams in Poznań and Wrocław who were both across the country from Gdańsk. The team advanced to the playoff league and came up against OWKS Kraków, Górnik Wałbrzych and Gwardia Warsaw, winning the playoffs group on goal difference and being promoted back to the I liga with OWKS Kraków.

The 1952 season was an unusual one due to the 1952 Summer Olympics in Helsinki. The start of the league was delayed due to the preparation of forming a team to go to the Olympics. As a result of this the Young Leaders Rally Cup was organised, and was the first League Cup in Polish football. The organising of the cup was to give the players an opportunity to show off their skills, and with a more relaxed competition compared to the league would provide the Polish team with the best possible preparation to perform well at the Olympics. The cup ran from April – July and initially saw two groups where each team played each other twice, with the top three teams in each group going through to the playoffs to decide the winner and the final standings. Lechia finished 3rd in their group and thus played against Lech Poznań who also finished 3rd in their group to play in the 5th placed playoff. Lech won the game 2–1, meaning Lechia finished in 6th place overall in the Young Leaders Rally Cup. After the Olympics, in which Poland were knocked out in the first round, the league officially started, around five months later than it usually would. The league took a similar format to the cup, with the teams being split into two groups, with the two winners playing each other to decide on that years champions. Lechia finished the disruptive season in 7th place, ensuing they remained in the league for the following season. The 1953 season returned to normality with one league and each team playing each other twice. The season saw Lechia struggle and finish bottom of the league, and were again relegated from the top division finding the increased level of competitiveness difficult to deal with over the course of a full season.

Being back in the II liga Lechia once again found themselves to be competitive. While the club struggled more so than the teams around them in terms of scoring goals, Lechia were the best team defensively in the league, shown by their ability to keep clean sheets, having 12 clean sheets in their 20 games. The team finished the season on 28 points, the same as Stal Sosnowiec who ended up winning the league, but found themselves finish in second place due in part to Stal scoring 10 more goals than Lechia and having a much better goal difference. The immediate promotion and return to the I liga showed that at the time the club were in a position where they were competitive, but too good for the second division, yet struggled against the much better organised clubs in the first division.

=== Early "Golden Years" and top division stay (1955–1963) ===
Upon Lechias return to the Ekstraklasa, the players involved during these years and the initial success of the team upon their return to the I liga, were therefore seen as being the club's "golden years" of their early history. Players such as Bogdan Adamczyk, Henryk Gronowski, Robert Gronowski, Roman Korynt, Hubert Kusz, Czesław Lenc, Czesław Nowicki, and Roman Rogocz, all of whom had long playing careers with Lechia, were all important in making the club competitive upon their return to the league. Their first season back, 1955, was at the time the club's most successful season in their history. On their way to a 5th-place finish in the league, their highest at that point, they beat strong teams at the time such as ŁKS Łódź, Lech Poznań, Zagłębie Sosnowiec, and the 1955 Polish champions Legia Warsaw. The season also provided the chance for the club's first piece of silverware by reaching the Polish Cup final for the first time. Lechia's route in the Polish Cup (Polish: Puchar Polski) to the final saw them beating Sandecja Nowy Sącz, Wisła Kraków, Odra Opole and Gwardia Warsaw. The final saw Lechia play Legia Warsaw at the Polish Army Stadium, Legia's home stadium. Lechia lost the game 5–0 after a hat-trick from Kempny, and a goal each from Pohl and Słaboszowski seeing them finish as runners-up in the cup, and only the second team formed after the Second World War to feature in the Polish Cup final.

In the league, the 1956 season was more successful than the year prior, seeing Lechia finish on the podium for the first time, with the club also becoming the first formed after the war to finish in the top three. Despite only scoring 25 goals in 22 games, Lechia finished the season in 3rd place. The club relied heavily on their defence that season keeping 10 clean sheets and conceding only 21, the second lowest in the league that season, while their highest goal scorer was Rogocz who scored only 7 for the club that season in the league. The achievement of 3rd place happened under the guidance of Tadeusz Foryś, arguably Lechia's greatest manager in their earlier years, seeing them promoted from the second tier, taking them to a cup final, and achieving their highest finish of 3rd place.

The following season saw Lechia remaining competitive, but with the defensive side of the team not performing as well for the team as they went on to finish in 5th place. Once again the team only scored 25 goals in 22 games, the joint second lowest in the league, and the only team to not score more than 25 goals to not be relegated. Despite only scoring 25 goals that season in the league the team did see a player scoring the club's first hat-trick in the top division, with Bronisław Szlagowski scoring 3 in a 5–0 win over Zagłębie Sosnowiec. While defensively the team was not as strong as in 1956, the 29 goals they conceded, which was still among the better sides in the division, ensured the team finished in the top half of the league for a third successive season. At the end of the season, Tadeusz Foryś, who saw Lechia's rise from the II liga to being a challenger for the top places in the I liga, left Lechia to manage Arka Gdynia.

Following the departure of Foryś who made Lechia defensively strong, the team's fortunes declined from the season with one notable difference from the previous season being the number of goals the team conceded. The side fell to 8th place, just surviving relegation by a single point. This was a trend which was to continue for Lechia. While the team improved to finish 6th in the 1959 season, the team only managed to score 19 goals in their 22 games, with only one team scoring fewer, Stal Sosnowiec, who finished bottom of the league. The next three seasons saw the team flirting with relegation, finishing 9th in 1960, scoring the joint fewest in the league and surviving relegation by a point, 8th in 1961, scoring the joint second least in the league but surviving more comfortably by 5 points, and finishing 9th again in 1962. The 1962 saw a change in the league format, with the season changing from a summer league (playing from spring-autumn) to it becoming a winter league (playing autumn-spring). The league for that season was therefore shorter, with teams playing a total of 13 games, 12 in a mini league, and once in a playoff game to formalise the final standings.

Over these years where Lechia struggled, some of the players who were important in the club's rise during the early and mid 1950s started to move away or retire. Henryk Gronowski initially left in 1961, but later returned over the summer in 1963, his brother, and one of Lechia's most important forwards for Lechia during this era, Robert Gronowski, left in 1960, the ever present defenders Hubert Kusz and Czesław Lenc left in 1960 and 1962, and Roman Rogocz, who scored more than 100 goals for Lechia during his 15-year career at the club, retired in 1962. Each of these players made more than 100 appearances in the I liga for Lechia, leaving Lechia without the quality and experience these players provided. This loss of quality was evident during the 1962-63 season which ended up being a difficult one for Lechia. In the 26 games that season, they only managed to win 6, drawing 3, with the side losing 17, scoring only 20 goals, and conceding 48. This caused the team to finish second from bottom, being 4 points from safety, and were relegated from the Ekstraklasa with Lech Poznań, ending their 9 season long spell of continuous top division football.

=== Decline and fall to the third division (1963–1971) ===
While some of Lechia's important players remained at the club after their relegation, including long serving players such as; Bogdan Adamczyk, Jerzy Apolewicz, Janusz Charczuk, Roman Korynt, Czesław Nowicki, Zbigniew Żemojtel, and the return of Henryk Gronowski after the club's relegation, the squad struggled to adapt to falling down a division. That season Lechia lost more games than they managed to win, and were only able to secure a 10th-placed finish out of 16 teams. Lechia did adapt to the new division better than Lech Poznań however who suffered back to back relegations, showing the rise in competitiveness since the last time Lechia were in the II liga.

From their second season Lechia had adapted to the league and increased their competitiveness, finding themselves in 7th for the 1964–65 season. This season saw Lechia playing Arka Gdynia for the first time, with the two clubs quickly becoming fierce rivals and leading to the Tricity Derby. Lechia won the first ever meeting between the two clubs with the game finishing 2–1. The club also saw in improvement the following year by finishing in 6th for the 1965–66 season. While these seasons were an improvement on their first season back in the second tier, Lechia never found themselves more than 4 points clear from relegation, the equivalent of 2 wins during that period. This shows that while Lechia were finishing in the mid-table, they were only one bad season, or one bad run of games from finishing in the relegation zone.

This possibility of a bad run of games leading to Lechia being relegated became a reality in the 1966–67 season, which saw a winless run of 8 games, including a run of 5 straight defeats without scoring a goal in this run. Lechia were relegated by a single point at the end of the season, and were to be playing in the third tier for the first time in their history.

Lechia will have expected to be competitive following their fall to the III liga, and the team proved that they could be. Their first season saw them finishing in 2nd, however they were clear behind Arkonia Szczecin, and although they did finish in 2nd place, only the league winners from the four groups of the third division were promoted. The 1967–68 season also saw Lechia's first Gdańsk Derby with Stoczniowiec Gdańsk, despite both teams being formed in 1945 it took 22 years before they met in a competitive setting. Stoczniowiec won the first derby between the two clubs 2–1, in a derby that would go on to be played often over the next two decades. At the end of the season, the long serving forward who had three spells with Lechia, Bogdan Adamczyk, retired from playing football. Adamczyk was the last remaining player who had featured for the club during their "Golden Years" the decade before. Although one club legend retired, the following season saw the introduction of Zdzisław Puszkarz, a youngster from the Lechia academy, who would one day become a club legend himself. The season did not go as planned for Lechia, with the team finishing in 5th, and seeing their rivals Arka top the league.

Over the next three years however Lechia maintained a consistent challenge on fighting for the league title. The 1968–69 season saw Lechia finishing in 3rd place, conceding only 18 in 30 league games, and keeping an impressive 18 clean sheets. Lechia were still off the pace needed to mount a challenge for a title, but the club had seen improvements since the previous season. The next season Lechia had improved to a 2nd-placed finish, losing only 3 games all season, including losing to eventual champions Lech Poznań, and finishing only 1 point behind Lech, meaning the loss to Lech in the penultimate game of the season may have cost Lechia's chance of winning the league themselves. Lechia did not have to wait long however to win the league for themselves and make a return to the II liga. In the 1971–72 season Lechia won 22 of their 30 games, clearly winning the league with having a 9-point gap to Stoczniowiec in 2nd place, having the second best attack in the league, and by far the best defence in the league conceding only 13 goals and keeping 21 clean sheets, this despite the fact that of the 4 league defeats that season, 3 of them came in Lechia's first 4 league games.

=== A decade in the second division (1972–1982) ===
After finding themselves in the second division Lechia performed well and comfortably finished above the relegation zone in 7th place, winning and losing 9 games each over the season, and drawing 12, of which 8 were 0–0 draws. This followed the trend of Lechia not scoring many, but being set up well defensively, with the high number of extra points picked up from draws helping them to finish clear of the bottom 4. The 1973–74 season saw a change of format in the II liga, which was originally just a single league of 16 teams. From this season the division was split into two leagues of 16 teams each and 32 teams in total, a Northern group and a Southern group, with Lechia being placed in the Northern group. This change made it harder for teams to gain promotion from the division as they now had to win the league, where as before finishing as runners-up was good enough for promotion to the I liga. Lechia finished 4th in the league, in what was generally an average season for the team, but due to the top 3 teams taking so many points from the lower placed teams in the league Lechia recorded a high finish, with players such as Tomasz Korynt and Andrzej Głownia having standout seasons.

The 1974–75 season saw a vast improvement from the team, winning 16 of their 30 games, and losing only 6. The club also improved in goals scored, while also being the joint best team defensively. Tomasz Korynt, Leonard Radowski, and Zdzisław Puszkarz each managed 8 goals in the league that season as Lechia went on to finish in 2nd place, only 2 points of the league winners Widzew Łódź. This season also saw Zdzisław Puszkarz called up to the Poland national team to play against East Germany, despite Lechia playing in the second division. The following season was a good season for the Tricity region with the 4 teams in the league from the region all finishing in the top 5 places. Once again Lechia had a strong season, this time only losing 4 games, but again finished in 2nd place, this time 3 points behind rivals Arka Gdynia. 1976–77 was a little blip in Lechia's run of high finishing seasons, managing 5th in the league, and their lowest finish since the league split into two groups. Lechia resumed their title fight from the following season, being the clear best team in the league along with Gwardia Warsaw, with both teams recording over 20 wins and losing only 2 games all season, and finishing nearly 20 points clear of Bałtyk Gdynia in 3rd place. Krzysztof Matuszewski also recorded 15 goals over the season, among the highest in the league. While Lechia were close to winning the league, it was once again not enough, with the club being a single point from winning the league.

From the 1978–79 season the leagues were changed from a Northern and Southern group to Eastern and Western groups. The change did not initially impact the club, with Lechia finishing in 3rd place, missing out on promotion by a single point for the second successive season. Lechia also went on a cup run, playing Gryf Słupsk, Wielim Szczecinek, Widzew Łódź, and Unia Tarnów on their way to reaching the quarterfinals. Lechia lost in the quarterfinals to eventual runners-up Wisła Kraków. Lechia's fortunes in the II liga did start to change, and after narrowly missing out on promotion in four of the last five seasons, the club found themselves slipping down into mid-table finishes the next two seasons. 6th and 7th-placed finishes in seasons where Lechia nearly won, drew and lost the same number of games each time saw the club looking far less competitive and saw the departure of talismanic midfielder Zdzisław Puszkarz in 1981. It was evident in 1981–82 that Puszkarz, a lifelong Lechia fan and a player who had been seen as too good for the second tier for many years, hugely contributed to the club's fortunes and was irreplaceable for the team on the pitch. Lechia fell to 14th after winning only 6 of their 30 games, scored only 19 goals, and ended up 7 points from safety. Lechia were relegated to the third tier, this time without any star players or big names to help the club out.

=== 'Rebirth', cup wins, and Ekstraklasa football (1982–1988) ===

1982–83 Polish Cup starting line-up.

Although Lechia found themselves in the third tier for the 1982–83 season, it turned out to be a historic year for the club, and was seen as the club's 'rebirth'. The team finished top of their division, going on to concede only 9 goals in their 26 games. Due to Lechia being in the third tier they joined the Polish Cup in the second round. The first game of the competition saw them play Start Radziejow, who they narrowly beat 3–2 on penalties. The cup saw them playing 4 Ekstraklasa teams on their route to the final. They beat Widzew Łódź 5–4 on penalties, after drawing 1–1, Śląsk Wrocław 3–0 in the round of 16, Zagłębie Sosnowiec 1–0 in the quarter-finals, and Ruch Chorzów in the semi-finals 4–3 on penalties. The final saw them playing Piast Gliwice who were in the second tier. They won the final 2–1 with goals from Krzysztof Górski and Marek Kowalczyk to win their first-ever piece of silverware.

In 1983–84 Lechia were again in the second tier (west group), and qualified for the Polish Super Cup (Polish: SuperPuchar Polski) due to winning the Polish Cup the season before. It was the first-ever season of the Super Cup, and saw the cup winning team play the Ekstraklasa champions, resulting in Lechia playing Lech Poznań. Despite Lech being heavy favourites Lechia won the Super Cup with a late goal from Jerzy Kruszczyński. This resulted in 1983 being the most successful season in the club's history up to that point, with the team winning both cup competitions it participated in despite not being in the top division. Lechia's stay out of the Ekstraklasa was not to last long, however, with the team winning the 1983–84 II Liga season, and as a result were promoted back to the Ekstraklasa. A division they had narrowly missed out of playing in many seasons before, and was their first time back in the top tier for 21 seasons. That season Lechia also qualified for the UEFA Cup Winners' Cup due to winning the Polish Cup the season before. In the first round, Lechia was drawn to Italian footballing giants, Juventus. The first game was played in Turin, Italy, with Juventus easily winning 7–0. With the team knowing they were all but knocked out already the team put on an inspiring performance scoring 2 goals against the European giants in the home leg of the competition. The Lechia home game against Juventus was not only a sporting spectacle, but proved to be a place of mass demonstration for the Solidarity movement, which many fans were part of. In the 40,000 crowd was Lech Wałęsa, with the crowds chants of "Solidarność! Solidarność! Solidarność!" causing the second half to be delayed by 6 minutes and with broadcasters resulting to mute the whole second half of the TVs broadcast. The Lechia manager, Jerzy Jastrzębowski, said of the event; "We were in the dressing room during half-time when we heard it and it sent shivers down our spines, the whole ground singing 'Solidarnosc'."

For the 1984–85 Ekstraklasa season, a season in which all teams struggled for goals (an average of 1 goal a game), Lechia finished 12th having scored 23 goals, and with only 2 of their wins that season coming from scoring 2 more goals than their opponents. The season after Lechia finished just above the relegation zone by a single point, and seeing local rivals Bałtyk Gdynia getting relegated a place below. Lechia was lucky that season, with the team finishing 3rd from bottom, with four teams normally getting relegated. However, a change to the division below saw only 2 teams going down that season. 1986–87 saw the team once again fighting relegation. For the 3rd season in a row, Lechia only managed 23 goals in their league 30 games, however, the team once again stayed up finishing in 11th. The team were once more fighting a relegation battle during the 1987-88 season. Lechia legend Puszkarz rejoined the team after having left 5 seasons prior. It had always been his dream to play for Lechia in the top flight, and this was the season where he achieved this accomplishment however it did not go according to plan. Despite the team finishing in 12th, which would normally be one position above the relegation zone, for that season though there was a relegation playoff, with 14th playing 11th, and 13th playing 12th. Lechia played Olimpia Poznań in the relegation playoff and lost over both legs 3–2 on aggregate. This saw Lechia being relegated with Zagłębie Lubin, the other team who would otherwise have normally been safe also suffered relegation after they lost both legs 4–3 to Górnik Wałbrzych on aggregate. The following season the relegation playoffs in the Ekstraklasa were scrapped.

=== Lower leagues and mergers (1988–2001) ===
After relegation from the Ekstraklasa, Lechia found themselves back in the II liga. During the 1988–89 season Lechia struggled to adapt to the new league, finishing 10th out of 16. Things failed to improve for Lechia during the next two seasons, finishing both 11th and 12th. The situation slightly improved for Lechia during the 1991–92 and the 1993–94 seasons finishing in 8th before their highest finish of 6th since being relegated. During this period there was a greater rivalry with the three major Tricity clubs, Lechia representing Gdańsk, with Arka and Bałtyk from Gdynia. The 1993–94 season was an important season for the Tricity teams. Bałtyk Gdynia finished highest in the league for the 3rd season in a row, while both Lechia and Arka faced each other for the first time in history in the 1993–94 Polish Cup, with Arka winning the match 1–0. The season was another difficult one for Lechia, in which they finished 14th, 1 place above the relegation zone. The struggles for Lechia reached a devastating end by the end of the 1994–95 season, with the team, ultimately being relegated to the 3rd Division, along with fellow rivals Arka Gdynia.

The 1995–96 season saw Lechia merge with Olimpia Poznań, becoming Olimpia-Lechia Gdańsk. Olimpia-Lechia Gdańsk played in the top division, while the continuation of the Lechia Gdańsk team played in the 3rd division, with the Lechia Gdańsk side being used as the team's official second team. By the end of the 1995–96 Ekstraklasa season Lechia-Olimpia Gdańsk finished 16th, and were ultimately relegated. The second team (Lechia Gdańsk) also narrowly miss relegation, finishing just above the relegation places. At the end of the 1995–96 season Lechia–Olympia Gdańsk was renamed as Lechia Gdańsk, promoting the team from the 3rd division to the 2nd. The new Lechia team failed to capitalize on the return to the second division by being relegated to the 3rd division straight away. The 1997–98 season was a better season for Lechia with the team finishing in 3rd place in the III liga.

Before the 1998–99 season Lechia had their 2nd merger within 3 years, this time merging with Polonia Gdańsk to create Lechia-Polonia Gdańsk taking Polonia's place in the 2nd division. This merger lasted 3 years, with the team's fortunes slowly deteriorating, finishing 7th in 1998–99, 14th in 1999–2000, and 19th in the 2000–01 season, and thus suffering another relegation to the 3rd division. In the 2001–02 season Lechia–Polonia competed in the 3rd division, while a newly formed Lechia Gdańsk team was formed in the 6th division. After the 2001–02 season Lechia–Polonia dissolved, resulting newly formed Lechia becoming the continuation of the original club, while Polonia Gdańsk having already reformed in the sixth tier in 1999.

=== Re-formation and re-start from the sixth tier (2001–2008) ===
The newly formed independent Lechia Gdańsk team had a lot of initial success, winning the league in its first year in the 6th tier in 2001–02 season. This form continued finishing first in the 2002–03 season in the 5th tier, as well as winning the 2003–04 season in the 4th tier, and also finishing first the season after in the 2004–05 3rd tier. After 4 seasons of being an independent club after failed mergers with Olimpia and Polonia, Lechia found itself back in the second tier of Polish football.

Back in the II liga Lechia finished the 2005–06 in 10th, comfortably above the automatic relegation zone, and clear of the relegation playoffs. With Lechia making more improvements during the 2006–07 season finishing in 5th.

The 2007–08 season was the team's 20th season outside of the top flight, having to come from two failed mergers, and working their way back into the 2nd division. During the season the MOSiR Stadium became a fortress, with Lechia winning 14 of the 17 games at home, losing only once at home, against Odra Opole. Lechia struggled more away from home, winning 6 of their 17 away games. Lechia was helped during the season with goal-scoring contributions from Maciej Rogalski, Paweł Buzała, and Piotr Cetnarowicz, with all three players scoring more than 10 goals over the course of the season. Despite the club's decent away form, it proved by the end of the season that their home form had massively helped Lechia in the league, with Lechia finishing the 2007–08 season as champions, and as a result, secured promotion back to the Ekstraklasa.

=== Return to the Ekstraklasa (2008–2018) ===
For the 2008–09 season Lechia returned to the Ekstraklasa for the first time since being relegated after the 1987–88 Ekstraklasa season. Lechia struggled in their first season of being back in the top flight of Polish football with the team losing 16 of the 30 games that season. They ended the season three points above the relegation zone, and stayed in the league mostly due to their home form (having 7 of their 9 wins that season from their home games). Lechia fared better during the 2009–10 season finishing in eighth, while also enjoying a cup run that took the team to the semi-finals of the 2009–10 Polish Cup losing in the semi-final to eventual cup winners Jagiellonia. In January 2009 the members of Lechia Gdańsk (OSP) signed a document forming Lechia Gdansk S.A. (Spółka Akcyjna = Stock Corporation). It was during this season that Gdansk was chosen to be one of the host cities of the UEFA Euro 2012 championships in Poland and Ukraine, meaning the team would be moving from their current MOSiR Stadium to a new 43,000 capacity stadium in 2011.

In Lechia's 3rd season back in the top flight, it was another season of consolidating their Ekstraklasa status. In the 2010–11 season the team once again finished in 8th place. It was, however, a more positive season that showed progression for the team as a whole. It was the first time since their promotion back to the top league that Lechia had won more games than they had lost, finished with a positive goal difference, and Lechia player Abdou Traoré finished joint runner up for most goals that season. And for the second season in a row Lechia reached the semi-finals of the 2010–11 Polish Cup, before losing 5–0 to Legia over the two legs. This was the last season in which Lechia played at the MOSiR Stadium, the stadium in which Lechia had played all of their home games since their formation in 1945. The last game to be played at the stadium was the final game of the season against Zagłębie Lubin, a game in which Lechia lost 2–1.

The 2011–12 season saw Lechia move into their new stadium, the first game to be played there saw Lechia playing against Cracovia, a game which finished 1–1. Lechia struggled during their first season inside the new and much larger stadium, winning only three of their home games that season. Lechia slumped to a 13th-place finish, in a season where they scored 21 goals in 30 games. In 2012–13 there were more positives for Lechia, again finishing in a mid-table 8th. The team once again struggled at home, winning only three games. With the relegation of Polonia Warsaw (who finished the season in sixth) due to financial issues, Lechia effectively finished seventh, and secured their highest finish since their return to the top flight.

There were major changes made for the 2013–14 Ekstraklasa season with the introduction of a Championship Round (teams who finish 1st–8th) and a Relegation Round (teams who finish 9th–16th). This took the overall games played in a season from 30 to 37. As ever Lechia finished eighth after the 30-game season qualifying for the Championship Round. Lechia finished the first-ever Championship Round in fourth place and just missing out on qualification for the qualifying rounds of the 2014–15 UEFA Europa League due to Zawisza Bydgoszcz winning the 2013–14 Polish Cup. The 4th-place finish meant that Lechia had achieved their highest finish since the 1956 season, in which Lechia finished third.

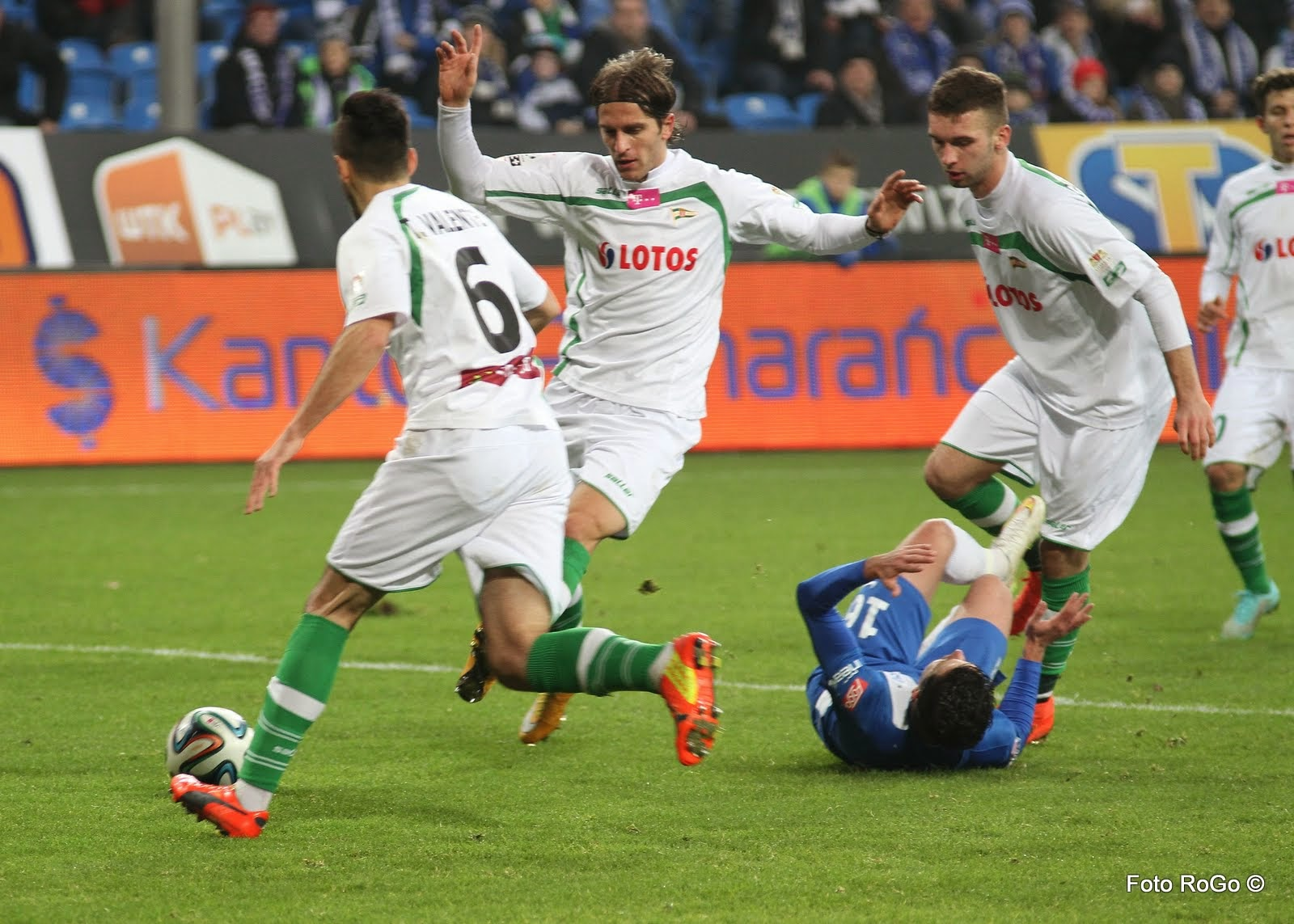
Away game with Lech Poznań in the 2014–15 Ekstraklasa

2014–15 saw Lechia struggling towards the lower end of the table by the time the winter break took place. During the mid-season transfer window Sebastian Mila rejoined the club where he had started his professional career 14 years earlier. The Polish international became Lechia's captain for the remainder of the season, and helped the club to an eighth-placed finish for the regular season. During the Championship Round, Lechia managed to finish in fifth, once again just missing out on qualifying for the Europa League.

2015–16 saw an intent for progression for Lechia. Joining Mila and Łukasik, the Poland internationals who were already at the club, saw the arrivals of Ariel Borysiuk, Sławomir Peszko, Jakub Wawrzyniak, Grzegorz Wojtkowiak, as well as former Serbian international Miloš Krasić. Despite the new players Lechia struggled at the start of the season and hovered above the relegation zone until the winter break. The team managed to reach seventh place by the end of the regular season. During the Championship Round Lechia once again finished fifth, and narrowly missed out on qualification for the Europa League Qualifiers. Grzegorz Kuświk who joined Lechia from Ruch during the summer finished the season with 11 goals, and was one of the top goal scorers that season.

2016–17 saw the improvements that fans had been anticipating. With players such as Haraslín as well as the internationally experienced players who joined the season before had now settled into the club. New arrivals such as twins Marco Paixão and Flávio Paixão, as well as Rafał Wolski arriving from Fiorentina and Dušan Kuciak from Hull City. The regular season saw Lechia winning all but three of their home games, and were top of the table at the end of 10 of the game weeks. Lechia ended the regular season in fourth. In the last home game of the season against Pogoń Lechia celebrated the careers of Piotr Wiśniewski and Mateusz Bąk. Both players had played over 10 years for Lechia, while Lechia was the only professional club Wiśniewski played for. Both players came on as substitutes in the 4–0 win over Pogon, with Wiśniewski scoring the final goal of the game, and Bąk made an important save to keep a clean sheet for the team. Going into the final game of the season Lechia was in fourth place, two points behind Legia who were top, Lechia knew that with a win away to Legia they had a great chance of winning their first-ever Ekstraklasa title. The game finished 0–0, and due to Lech and Jagiellonia drawing with each other, Lechia did not gain any positions and finished fourth with the same points as Lech and Jaga who finished in second and third. For the third season in a row Lechia once again missed out on qualification for the Europa League by a single position, this time due to their main rivals Arka Gdynia getting the place from winning the 2016–17 Polish Cup. Marco Paixão finished the season as the top scorer in the league with 18 goals, an award which was jointly shared with Marcin Robak.

There was much anticipation for the 2017–18 season after having the chance to win the title up until the final game the season before. However, any optimism of a repeat was short-lived. Lechia spent most of the season in the bottom half of the table and finished the regular season in 14th, one place and one point above the relegation zone. This was the first season Lechia had featured in the Relegation Round. Wins against Termalica Nieciecza, Arka Gdynia and Piast Gliwice ensured that Lechia finished the Relegation Round in 13th place, two places and three points above the relegation zone. Marco and Flávio had a huge contribution to Lechia staying up, with 16 goals from Marco and 10 for Flávio. At the end of the season Sebastian Mila retired from football, after having had two spells with Lechia.

=== Stokowiec and new success (2018–2022) ===

2018–19 Polish Cup starting line-up. The only goalscorer in the game, Artur Sobiech, started on the bench.

Piotr Stokowiec was in place for the final few games of the disappointing 2017–18 season and was in place ready for the 2018–19 Ekstraklasa season. The first game of the 2018-19 season saw Lechia beating Jagiellonia Białystok, with Sławomir Peszko receiving a straight red. After the game Peszko received a three-month ban for a dangerous kick at Arvydas Novikovas. The season started well, with Lechia winning five of their first seven games, while also holding Legia to draw in Warsaw. Lechia's first defeat of the season came away to Wisła Kraków after the international break, before losing a 3–0 lead and drawing 3–3 with Zagłębie Lubin in the game after. After a difficult September, Lechia went on a 13-game unbeaten run, including wins over rivals Arka Gdynia and beating Lech Poznań away in Poznań for the first time in 52 years. The unbeaten run lead to Lechia leading the Ekstraklasa when the league broke up for the winter break. During this time Lechia also went on a cup run beating Wisła Kraków, Resovia Rzeszow and Bruk-Bet Termalica Nieciecza to reach the quarterfinals. After the break Lechia continued their good form losing only 2 of the 11 games after the restart. After losing the final game of the regular season to Cracovia 4–2, they found themselves in the first place due to goal difference, having +3 goals more than Legia Warsaw. Lechia's good fortunes in the cup also continued after the restart, beating Górnik Zabrze in the quarterfinals, Raków Częstochowa in the semifinal, meeting Jagiellonia Białystok in the final. The final was played on 2 May 2019 at the National Stadium in Warsaw. After a close game Flávio Paixão scored for Lechia in the 85th minute, before it was disallowed by the VAR. Artur Sobiech scored the winning goal in the fifth minute of stoppage time, winning the Polish Cup for Lechia, the second time in their history they won the competition. After the cup triumph, the championship group was a disappointment in comparison. After losing only four games in the previous 30, Lechia lost four of the seven championship games. Despite the disappointing end, it was a historic campaign for Lechia after winning the Polish Cup for the second time, and finishing third in the league, their joint highest finish in the league which was last achieved in 1956.

Lechia started the season with the 2019 Polish Super Cup playing against Polish Champions Piast Gliwice. Two goals from Lukáš Haraslín and one from Jarosław Kubicki meant that Lechia were 3-0 up in the final before a late consolation for Piast from Patryk Sokołowski. Lechia won the Polish Super Cup for the second time in their history by winning 3–1. Another challenge for Lechia to face early in the season was playing in a European competition for only the second time in their history. Lechia were to play in the 2019–20 UEFA Europa League, with the team being drawn against Brøndby IF. The first game went well, with Lechia winning 2–1 at home, with goals from Flávio Paixão and Patryk Lipski. The second leg however went Brøndby's way. After finishing the away leg 2–1, with Lechia's goal coming from Flávio Paixão, the game went to extra time. Brøndby scored early in extra time, and with Lechia pushing for an equalizer, scored again late on meaning Lechia lost the tie 5–3 on aggregate. The start of the 2019–20 season proved to be difficult for Lechia, with new signing Žarko Udovičić receiving a four match ban after being sent off in the team's first game of the season against ŁKS Łódź. Lechia went on to only win one of their first six games, which was against Wisła Płock. After the difficult start Lechia then went on a five match winning run which put them top of the league after beating Legia Warsaw away 2–1. After their winning run was ended by Zagłębie Lubin, the team had the Tricity Derby the following game. After goals from Artur Sobiech and Flávio Paixão (this being Paixão's seventh goal against Arka, making him the outright highest scorer in the fixture) Lechia lost a 2–0 lead and finished the game 2–2, with Udovičić again being sent off, this time receiving a two-month ban. After the game against Arka, Lechia failed to win any of the next three games, losing two, placing the team in 9th place at the mid-way point of the regular season. For the start of the second round of fixtures Lechia beat ŁKS Łódź 3–1, with Flávio Paixão scoring two goals. These two goals put Paixão on 68 goals in the Ekstraklasa, overtaking Miroslav Radović as the highest scoring foreigner in the top league of Poland. Lechia went on to win the next two games while managing to keep clean sheets in both games. The 3 match winning run was ended after a 3–0 defeat against Jagiellonia Białystok. It was announced a few days after the game, on 17 December, that the players and staff had not been played by the club since September and had failed to pay the players their bonuses for winning the Polish Cup in May. Due to the players having not been paid for months they would have been legally be able to apply for a termination of their contract, and leading to the possibility of many important players leaving during the next transfer window. After the finances had been resolved, Lechia lost the final game of the autumn round 3-0 going into the winter break in 7th. To help with the club's future financial situation key players on high wagers were told they could leave during the winter break. Key players that left included; Lukáš Haraslín, Artur Sobiech, Daniel Łukasik, Rafał Wolski and Sławomir Peszko with Błażej Augustyn training with the Lechia II team until arrangements could be made. Although key players were missing and there being a greater emphasis on playing the youth players in the first game back after the winter break, the team started the second half of the season drawing 2–2 with a Championship chasing Śląsk Wrocław team. During the game it was clear to see the club's current situation with their finances with the entire bench being made up of teenagers from the U23's team. Lechia won the following game 1–0 against Piast with Kacper Urbański starting the game, becoming the youngest ever Lechia player to start a competitive game, and the youngest ever player to start a game in the Ekstraklasa. On 10 March it was announced that all games would be played behind closed doors due to the coronavirus pandemic. After the announcement Polish football would be played without fans present, Lechia went on to beat Piast Gliwice 2–1 in an empty stadium in the Polish Cup to reach the semi-finals, leaving only 2 wins to retain the cup. Announcements were made over the following days and weeks, with the Ekstraklasa, I liga and Polish Cup fixtures all being suspended until 26 April at the earliest. At the time of the league's suspension Lechia were in 7th place with 4 games left to play in the regular season. After a difficult restart to the season Lechia went on a run to climb the table, including a 4–3 win over rivals Arka Gdynia. This run coincided with the meeting of Lech Poznań in the Polish Cup semi-final, against whom Lechia beat 4–3 in penalties after the game finished 1–1. This led Lechia into their second Polish Cup final in successive years. Lechia finished the season in 4th place and played Cracovia in the Polish Cup final, losing the final 3–2 after the game went into extra-time.

Lechia went into the 2020–21 season celebrating their 75th anniversary, but with the fans and team knowing they had lost some key players from previous seasons. Filip Mladenović joined rivals Legia Warsaw while Lukáš Haraslín made the permanent move to U.S. Sassuolo. Lechia struggled at the start of the season, losing two of their first three games, before finding some form and moving to a high of 4th place. The effects of the coronavirus were again felt by the team, with the match against Wisła Kraków being postponed due to an outbreak in the Wisła team. Lechia eventually struggled with a Covid outbreak of their own, with Jaroslav Mihalík being the first confirmed case in the club on 10 October, getting the virus while on international duty. In early November the club had an outbreak affecting 13 players and 7 members of the coaching staff. After a month with no games due to the team's outbreak the Lechia team returned to play Śląsk Wrocław, winning the game 3–2. After this initial success after the team's isolation, Lechia lost the following four games without scoring a goal. Going into the final game before the winter break the team found themselves in the bottom half of the table, but a 3–0 win over Cracovia helped them to rise up to 8th. After the winter break Lechia's poor form returned with defeats to Jagiellonia in the league and Puszcza Niepołomice in the Polish Cup, with some fans questioning the role of Stokowiec as the team's manager. After a poor run of results which saw 6 defeats in 7 games, Lechia picked up form and gained some momentum in the league, winning 5 of the next 8 games, losing only one, and mounting a threat to the top three places in the league. After this run Lechia's form once again dropped, winning only 6 points from the final 7 games of the season. The team went into the final game of the season knowing that a win would be enough to secure European football for the following season, but a defeat to Jagiellonia on the final day of the season saw the side slump to a disappointing 7th-place finish.

The 2021–22 season saw changes in the league structure, increasing the teams from 16 to 18 and scrapping the championship and relegation leagues at the end of the season, seeing all teams playing 34 league games a season instead of the previous 37. The 2021–22 season started relatively well for Lechia losing only one of their first six games and securing 9 points in the process. Lechia dropped points against Radomiak Radom in their sixth game of the season after having been 2–0 up to draw the game 2–2. While the season looked more promising, and they play from the squad looked better than the previous season, this kind of collapse in Lechia games was becoming too common under Stokowiec's reign. Shortly after the game with Radomiak it was announced that Piotr Stokowiec had officially left the club, Stokowiec being Lechia's second longest serving manager in the club's history. On 1 September 2021 it was announced that the Pogoń Szczecin assistant manager Tomasz Kaczmarek was to become the new Lechia manager. Lechia under Kaczmarek initially performed well in the league, going on a nine-game unbeaten run in the league under the manager, a run of 10 games in total with Stokowiec's last game in charge being included. During this unbeaten run of games, Lechia convincingly beat teams such as their wins against Górnik Łęczna and the current Polish champions, Legia Warsaw. This good form saw Lechia closing in on the leaders Lech, and going on to fight for a few weeks with Raków for the second and third places. The impressive run came to a disappointing end with a 5–1 defeat to Pomeranian rivals Pogoń which saw Lechia's run of form drastically change, going on to lose 3 of the next 4 games, and being in 5th place in the league as the Ekstraklasa stopped for the winter break. After the break Lechia's inconsistent form continued, seeing a convincing win against Śląsk, before being convincingly beaten against Cracovia. Lechia's third game of the league's return was against the league leaders Lech Poznań, with the club needing a positive result to keep up the pace with the teams in the top 3 places. Despite Lech being the dominant team for much of the game, a late goal from 17 year old Filip Koperski secured a 1–0 win against their league rivals, and keeping themselves in touching distance of a top 3 finish. The win against Lech proved to be a blip, with the club failing to win any of the next three games including losing against Radomiak Radom who were also trying to reach the top 3, and only drawing with relegation candidates Wisła Kraków. Financial struggles around the club were once again raised, and could be seen as a reason for the club's poor performance, however these concerns were soon quashed and the situation was not as bad as first feared. Despite these concerns, Lechias form improved, with the club going on to win 5 of the next 7 games, and with Raków Częstochowa winning the Polish Cup, 4th place would be good enough for Lechia to secure European football. One game of note in this run was against Warta Poznań, with Flávio Paixão scoring both goals in a 2–0 win, and in the process scoring Lechia's 1000th Ekstraklasa goal, and becoming the first foreign player to score 100 goals in the Ekstraklasa. The penultimate game of the season saw them face off against Pogoń Szczecin knowing that a draw would secure 4th place in the league and the chance to play in Europe. Despite both teams starting the game strongly the contest fizzled out to a 0–0 draw. This was enough for Lechia to secure their place in the following seasons Europa Conference League, only their third time of playing European football in their history.

=== Current era - relegation from Ekstraklasa and return (2022–) ===
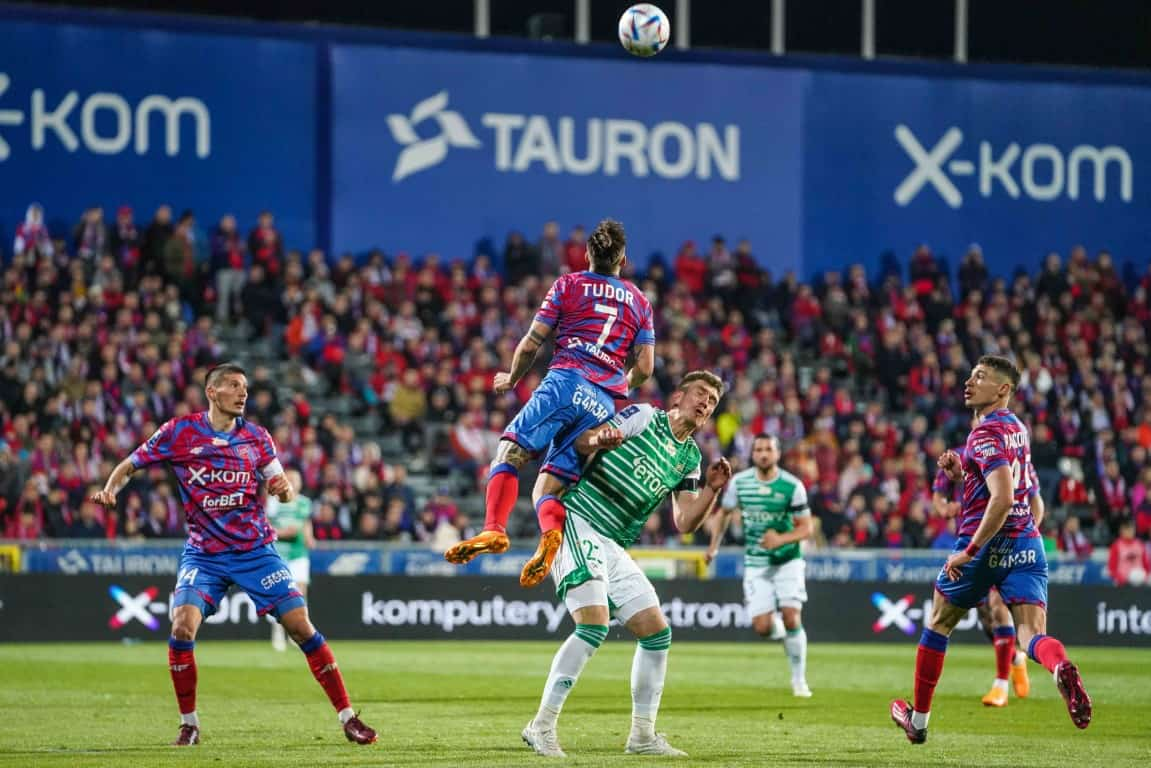
Away game with Raków Częstochowa in the 2022–23 Ekstraklasa

The following 2022–23 season was very unsuccessful for Lechia. In the Conference League qualifiers, after beating Akademija Pandev in the first round, they got eliminated from European football by Rapid in the following round. They ended their Polish Cup journey in the round of 16, losing the penalty shootout to Legia, who went on to win the competition. Most notably however, the White-Greens were relegated after losing at home to Zagłębie Lubin in the 31st matchday on 6 May 2023, ending their fifteen-year stint in the top flight.

Following relegation, many of the key players left the club, such as Łukasz Zwoliński, Jarosław Kubicki, Michał Nalepa and Flávio Paixão, among others. Led by their new manager Szymon Grabowski, Lechia contested the first round of the 2023–24 I liga against Chrobry Głogów with a matchday squad consisting of 8 youth players with no prior senior team playing experience. The club was also facing financial and organizational issues, including delayed staff payments and having to use placeholder kits in the early stages of the season. Following change of ownership in August, the arrival of foreign players such as Ivan Zhelizko, Maksym Khlan, Rifet Kapić and the record signing of Camilo Mena, Lechia found their footing in the second division. On 11 May 2024, they were promoted back to Ekstraklasa at their first attempt, after a 4–3 win over Wisła Kraków. They later became I liga champions on 19 May, following a 2–1 Tricity Derby win over Arka Gdynia.

== Historic club names ==
Year	Short version	Full name
1945	BOP Baltia Gdańsk	Biuro Odbudowy Portów Baltia Gdańsk
1946	KS BOP Lechia Gdańsk	Klub Sportowy Biuro Odbudowy Portów Lechia Gdańsk
1947	BZKS Lechia Gdańsk	Budowlany Związkowy Klub Sportowy Lechia Gdańsk
1951	ZS Budowlani Gdańsk	Związek Sportowy Budowlani Gdańsk
1955	TKS ZS Budowlani "Lechia"	Terenowe Koło Sportowe Związek Sportowy Budowlani "Lechia"
1959	BKS Lechia Gdańsk	Budowlani Klub Sportowy Lechia Gdańsk
1991	KS Lechia Gdańsk	Klub Sportowy Lechia Gdańsk
1992	FC Lechia SA	Football Club Lechia Spółka Akcyjna
1995	KP Olimpia-Lechia Gdańsk	Klub Piłkarski Olimpia-Lechia Gdańsk
1996	KS Lechia Gdańsk	Klub Sportowy Lechia Gdańsk
1998	Lechia-Polonia Gdańsk SSA	Lechia-Polonia Gdańsk Sportowa Spółka Akcyjna
2001	OSP Lechia Gdańsk	Ośrodek Szkolenia Piłkarskiego Lechia Gdańsk
2009	KS Lechia Gdańsk SA	Klub Sportowy Lechia Gdańsk Spółka Akcyjna

== Fan culture ==
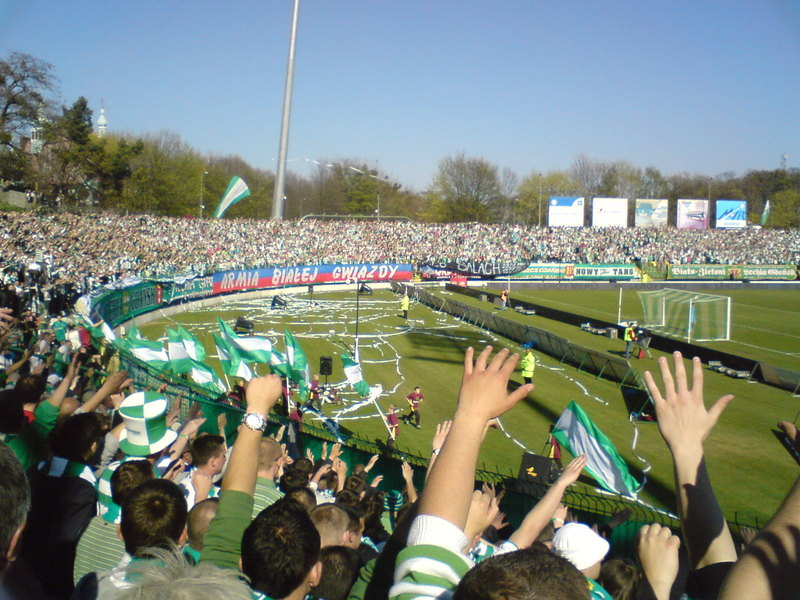
Lechia fans in Traugutta 29 during the Tricity Derby against Arka Gdynia, 25 April 2009.

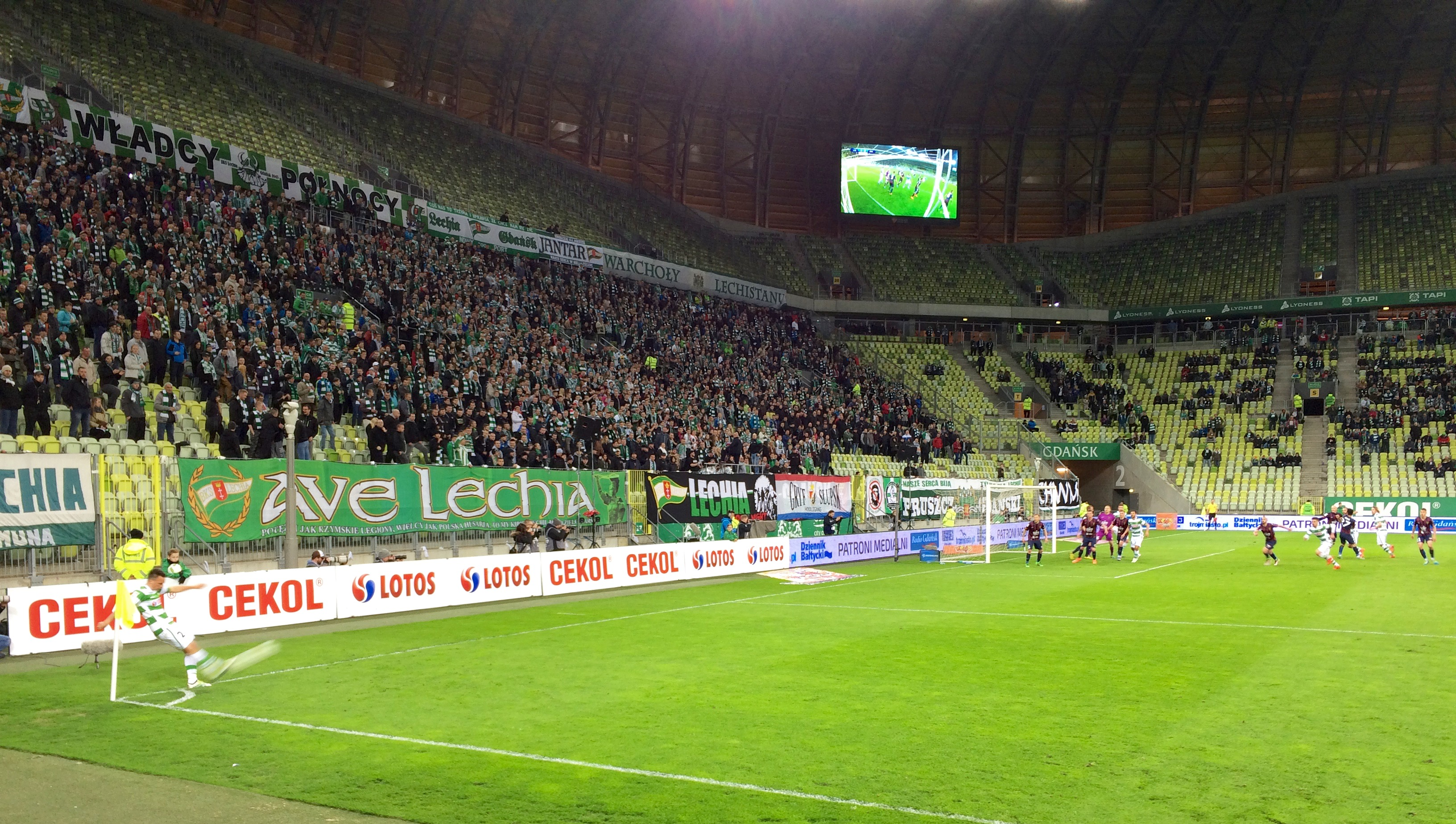
Fans in the Stadion Gdańsk, 19 April 2016 against Pogoń Szczecin.

Lechia Gdańsk is the most supported club in northern Poland, and is one of the most supported clubs in the country, despite not always being successful. Most of the support comes from Gdańsk and the Pomeranian region. The biggest supporters group is the "Lions of the North" group (Polish: Lwy Północy) who organise displays in the stadium as well as travel to away games. Outside of Gdańsk the club have 24 official fan groups linked to the club, with more unofficial fan groups. The official and unofficial fan groups can be found in the towns of; Braniewo, Bytów, Chojnice, Czersk, Dzierzgoń, Frombork, Kartuzy, Kwidzyn, Malbork, Mława, Miłobądz, Nowe, Nowy Dwór Gdański, Nowy Staw, Nowy Targ, Pelplin, Pisz, Pruszcz Gdański, Pszczółki, Sierakowice, Skarszewy, Skórcz, Smętowo, Sopot, Starogard Gdański, Tuchom and Zblewo with the club also having a fan group in England.

In the 1980s, many of the club's fans were active in the Solidarity movement which was fighting the communist regime in Poland. This included Lech Wałęsa, a fan of Lechia Gdańsk who was at the front of the Solidarity movement and became the first elected President of Poland after the fall of communism. Due to Gdańsk's role with the Solidarity movement, it is not unusual to see anti-communist slogans on banners in the stadium. A phrase often used by the club and the fans is "We're creating history" (Polish: My tworzymy historię), which can be associated to the role Lechia fans have had on the fall of communism in Poland, and with the club's increasing competitiveness in recent years, such as winning the Polish Cup, the Polish Super Cup and finishing third in the Ekstraklasa all in 2019.

Famous Lechia fans include Lech Wałęsa, the leader of the Solidarity trade union which helped to bring an end to communist rule in Poland and Poland's second President, Donald Tusk, the current prime minister of Poland and the President of the European Council from 2014 to 2019 is also a Lechia fan. Paweł Adamowicz, the mayor of Gdańsk from 1998 until his assassination in 2019, was a lifelong Lechia fan. He used his role as mayor of the city to help the club during its reformation in 2001.

=== Fan trouble ===
As with most football clubs during their history, both in the sport in general and in Poland, Lechia Gdańsk have had their own issues relating to the club's fans. On 25 May 2021 Gdańsk hosted the Europa League Final match between Villarreal and Manchester United. The night before the match saw Manchester United fans being attacked at a bar in the city, destroying the bar and leaving three United fans injured. While the reports after the attack were unconfirmed as to whether the fans were those of Lechia, the fans chanted "Lechia Gdańsk" as they were leaving the scene.

On 7 July 2022 an incident between Lechia fans before the match spilled into the stands during Lechia's Europa Conference League with Akademija Pandev. The stadiums bar, T29 Sports Pub, was damaged before the group of fans entered the stadium and caused fighting in the stadiums Zielony section. The fight saw the match being suspended on 8 minutes, with the break lasting for 40 minutes before play resumed. Police made arrests in the days after the match, with the Mayor of Gdańsk stating that taxpayer money would not be used to help the refurbishing of the bar. On 15 July, UEFA announced that Lechia would be handed a €50k fine, and one match to be played behind closed doors. The stadium closure punishment was announced to be suspended for 2 years, meaning the club would not have to serve the suspension if there was to be no crowd trouble within this time.

=== Friendships ===
==== Current friendships ====
The fans have a friendship with Śląsk Wrocław with which the two clubs fans have had a friendship since 1977, and have had friendly relations since 1967. This is the oldest fan friendship in Polish football. During the 2017/18 season, the two sets of fans celebrated their 40th Friendship Anniversary. Games between the two are often called "The Friendship Match".

There is also a mutual friendship between fans of Gryf Słupsk and Lechia Gdańsk. Gryf Słupsk are also from the Pomeranian area of Poland. The two teams have rarely met competitively due to Gryf often playing in the lower regional divisions. Gryf set up the Amber Cup Tournament, an indoor football tournament which takes place during the winter break. Gryf Słupsk hosted the tournament and have featured many times, winning in 2009, before the tournament was moved to Gdańsk due to the rise in popularity, and was hosted by Lechia Gdańsk from 2016 to 2018.

There are many other teams in the Pomeranian province which have friendly relations with Lechia or have sympathies towards the team. The Tricity Derby which is contested by the two biggest teams in the Pomeranian area has split the teams in the region with many fans backing Lechia in the derby. These are generally fans from; Chojniczanka Chojnice, Bytovia Bytów, Cartusia Kartuzy, Czarni Pruszcz Gdański, KP Starogard Gdański, Unia Tczew, Pomezania Malbork, Rodło Kwidzyn and Olimpia Sztum.

Other teams' fans who have friendly relations with Lechia include; Jeziorak Iława, Miedź Legnica, Hutnik Kraków, Mławianka Mława and Czech team SFC Opava. Despite being a basketball team, Czarni Słupsk fans are also closely linked with Lechia fans.

While not a friendship, Lechia fans have had an “agreement” (Polish: układy) with Stomil Olsztyn since 2016. Typically if agreements last the two teams become friends and develop a “friendship” (Polish: zgody). Lechia fans supposedly also have an agreement with Raków Częstochowa, and friendly relations with Górnik Łęczna.

==== Former friendships ====
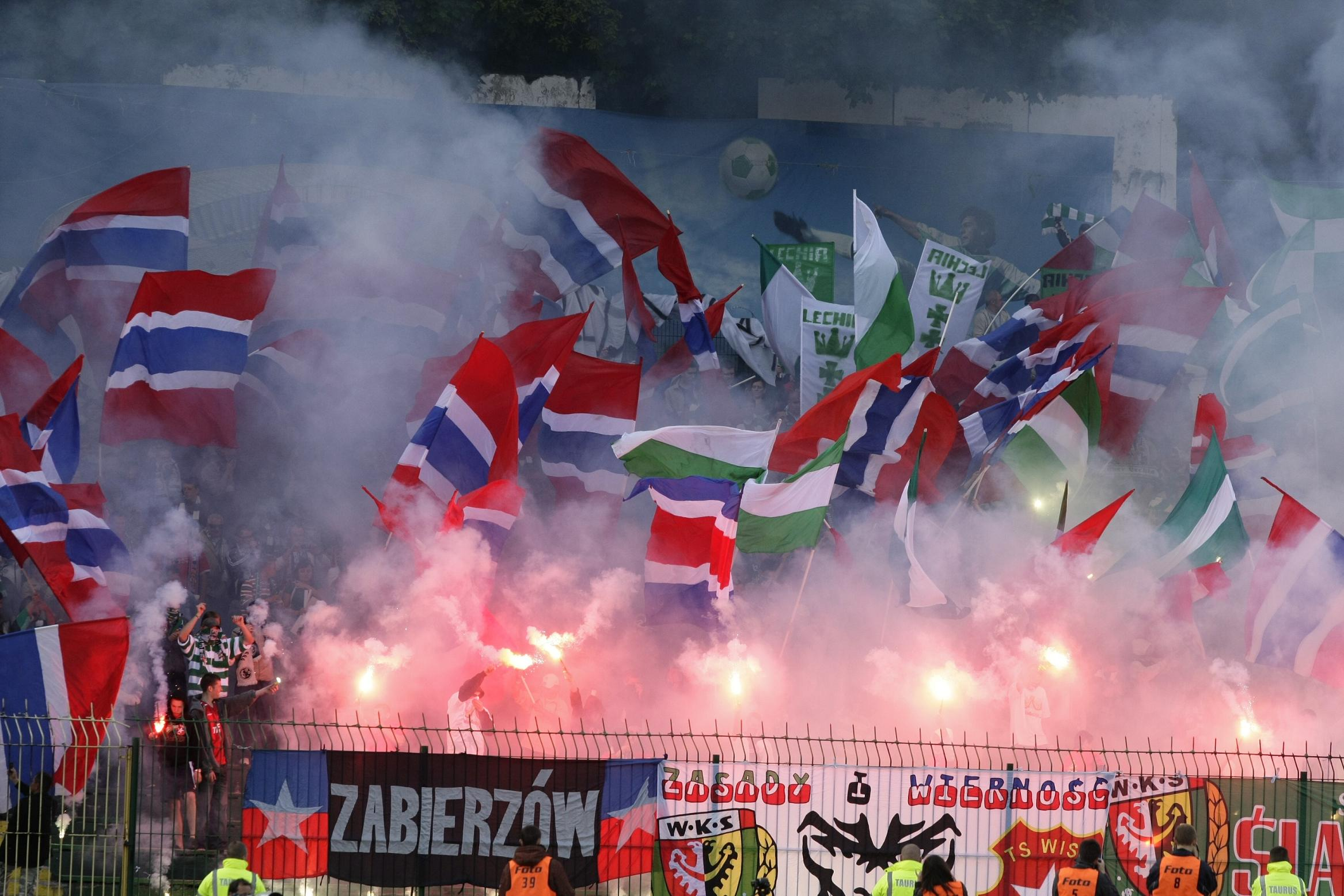
Lechia, Śląsk and Wisła fans in 2010 while all three were part of the TKWM coalition.

From 1983 until 1988 Lechia was part of a fan coalition which consisted of Widzew Łódź, Wisła Kraków, Jagiellonia Białystok, and Ruch Chorzów, being the biggest coalition in Poland at the time. The coalition broke up when Lechia fans wanted Śląsk Wrocław to join the coalition, but opposition from Widzew, Jagiellonia and Ruch prevented the coalition from growing. As a result, the coalition split with Lechia and Wisła fans siding with Śląsk.

Lechia fans had an agreement with Wisła Kraków dating back to 1973, and from 1988 until 2016 both sets of fans were involved in a fan coalition with Śląsk Wrocław. Wisła left the "Three Kings of Great Cities" (Polish: Trzej Królowie Wielkich Miast) coalition to join a new coalition of Widzew Łódź and Ruch Chorzów. This upset both Lechia and Śląsk fans as fans of Ruch Chorzów and Widzew Łódź were involved in the murder of a Śląsk fan in 2003. The main Lechia Gdańsk fan group posted that the decision for Wisła to form a friendship with Ruch was unacceptable for the fans of Lechia, and that the friendship was to be terminated. The main Śląsk Wrocław fan group posted a similar response the following day officially ending the TKWM alliance.

While not technically a former friendship it was also documented that Lechia fans had agreements with both Piast Gliwice and Wisła Płock since at least 2017 until around 2020. While this agreement did not progress into a friendship between fans, it is unlikely that there will be negative thoughts between each team's fans, as with the case of Wisła Kraków, and have a more neutral opinion of each other.

=== Rivals ===
Their biggest rivals are Arka Gdynia, the games between the two are known as the "Tricity derby" (Polish: Derby Trójmiasta). The two teams are the largest in the Tricity area, with Lechia representing Gdańsk and Arka representing Gdynia, these are the two largest cities in the Tricity area. The Tricity derby impacts the Pomeranian region as a whole as fans of the smaller clubs in the region will also sympathise with either Arka or Lechia, with some counties being fully behind one of the teams with other counties being split between the two. Lechia receives the greatest support outside of Gdańsk from Słupsk, Starogard Gdański, Chojnice, Malbork, Sopot, and Lębork. Arka receives most of its support outside of Gdynia from Tczew, Wejherowo, Rumia, and Kościerzyna. Lechia has the most success in the derby winning 16 to Arka's 11, with Lechia also being undefeated to Arka in the Ekstraklasa (10 wins, 4 draws).

Lech Poznań and Cracovia are rivals dating back to the time with their alliance with Wisła. This was due to the two largest fan coalitions in Poland, "Three Kings of Great Cities" (Lechia, Śląsk, and Wisła) and "The Great Triad" (Arka, Cracovia, and Lech) with any of the opposite coalition teams playing each other resulting in a big and hotly contested match.

In recent years there has been a growing rivalry with Legia Warsaw. While Legia have often been challenging for titles and trophies for much of their history, Lechia have not. While Lechia has been more competitive in recent years, and are finishing higher in the table, the matches between the two sides is starting to have more importance, with the Lechia home game against Legia often being one of the highest attended games of the season.

Other clubs whose fans have negative views of Lechia and vice versa are; Pogoń Szczecin (due to both clubs being from Northern regions in Poland, where historically there have been few competitive football clubs), Zagłębie Lubin (due to Zagłębie being the main rivals of Śląsk Wrocław, Lechia's biggest friendship), Jagiellonia Białystok, Ruch Chorzów, Widzew Łódź, Motor Lublin (despite Motor fans having a friendship with Śląsk Wrocław), GKS Katowice, Zawisza Bydgoszcz, Elana Toruń, Polonia Bytom, Górnik Zabrze, and Russian club FC Spartak Moscow.

Since 2016 Wisła Kraków has since turned into a rivalry for some fans, while other fans still see the club in a more positive light.

Bałtyk Gdynia is another rivalry due to the geographically close proximity between the two clubs. Over recent years, however, this fixture has not been much of a rivalry due to the teams being in different divisions for many seasons. This rivalry was at its biggest in the 1990s when the two clubs played each other often in the second tier.

Gedania Gdańsk and Stoczniowiec Gdańsk have historically been a derby for Lechia with games between any of the three teams being known as the Gdańsk Derby (Polish: Derby Gdańska). The rivalry with Gedania was at its biggest in the 1940s and 1950s while the rivalry with Polonia was at its height from the late 1960s to early 1980s. Due to the current leagues, the teams are in, this is no longer seen as a major rivalry, with fans of both Gedania and Stoczniowiec more likely to support Lechia in big games than Lechias opponents.

While not rivals per se with any of these teams in a competitive capacity, these local teams fans are all aligned with Arka for the Tricity derby and are, as such seen in lower regard compared to other local teams; Gwardia Koszalin, Kaszubia Kościerzyna, Gryf Wejherowo, Wisła Tczew and Orkan Rumia.

==== Tricity derby ====
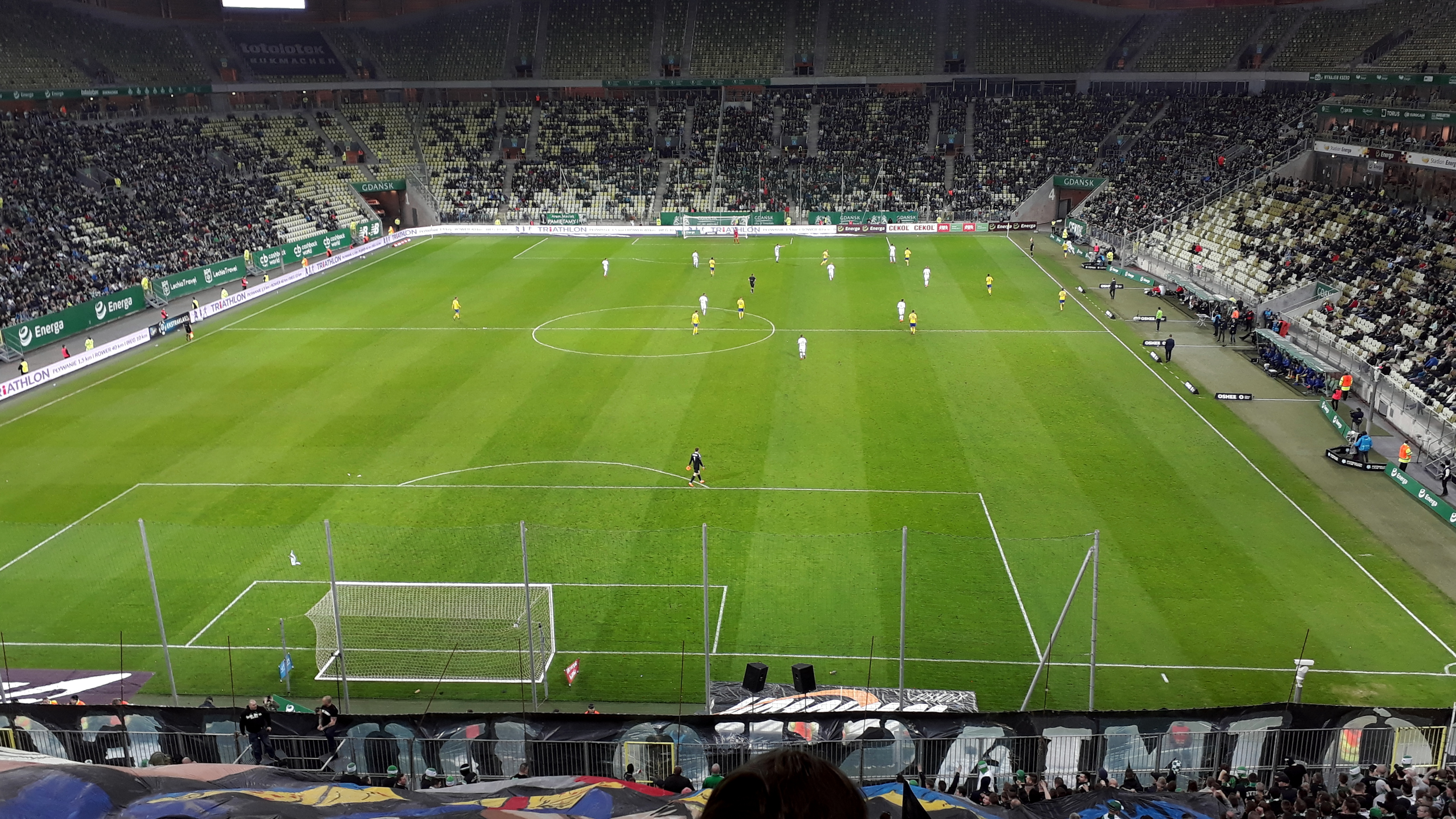
39th Tricity Derby between Lechia Gdańsk and Arka Gdynia, played in the 2017–18 Ekstraklasa

The Tricity derby is a match between Lechia and Arka Gdynia. The first derby was held on 2 September 1964 and was a 2–1 win for Lechia Gdańsk.

Matches	Lechia wins	Draws	Arka wins
48	19	17	12

==== Gdańsk derby ====
The Gdańsk Derby are games between teams based in Gdańsk. Historically the derby has referred to games between Lechia Gdańsk, Gedania Gdańsk and Stoczniowiec Gdańsk.

The first derby held between Lechia and Gedania Gdańsk was held on 23 September 1945 and was a 7–2 win for Lechia Gdańsk. The last time this derby was played was on 27 June 2004.

Matches	Lechia wins	Draws	Gedania wins
12	9	0	3

The first derby held between Lechia and Stoczniowiec Gdańsk was held on 20 August 1967 and was a 2–1 win for Stoczniowiec Gdańsk. The last time this derby was played was on 7 May 1983.

Matches	Lechia wins	Draws	Stoczniowiec wins
31	12	12	7

== Stadia ==
=== Stadion Gdańsk ===
The Polsat Plus Arena Gdańsk, previously called the Baltic Arena, PGE Arena Gdańsk (2010 – 2015), Stadion Energa Gdańsk (2015 – 2020) is the home stadium of Lechia Gdańsk. The stadium is located on ul. Pokoleń Lechii Gdańsk ("Generations of Lechia Gdańsk street") in the northern part of the city (Letnica district). The capacity of the stands is 41,620 spectators, all seated and roofed. Stadion Gdańsk is the largest arena in Ekstraklasa and the third largest in the country (after National Stadium and Silesia Stadium).

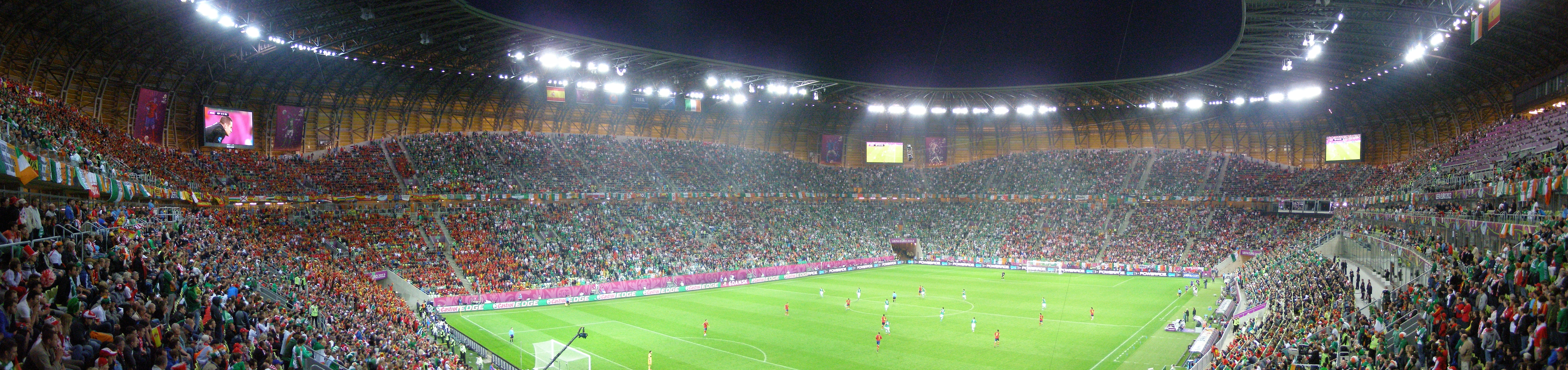
Stadion Gdańsk

Construction of the stadium started in 2008 and was completed mid-2011. The opening match was between Lechia Gdańsk and Cracovia and ended with 1–1 draw. The first international match, Poland – Germany, took place on 6 September 2011 and ended 2–2. The match was relocated from Warsaw because the National Stadium was not ready. Stadion Gdańsk is used by Lechia Gdańsk since 'the White-and-Green' relocated there from MOSiR Stadium.

The stadium was also one of the designated venues for the finals of Euro 2012. It hosted four matches during the tournament. Three matches in Group C and one quarter-final were played here. In 2010 the official name of the stadium changed to PGE Arena Gdańsk, on the basis of a sponsorship agreement with Polska Grupa Energetyczna (PGE Group). The contract with PGE ended, however, on 30 September 2015, after PGE chose not to renew the contract. On 9 November 2015 Energa was revealed as the new stadium's sponsor until 30 November 2020. On 21 May 2021 stadium's management signed a sponsorship agreement with Polsat TV broadcaster. The stadium hosted the 2021 UEFA Europa League Final as the Gdańsk Stadium due to UEFA sponsorship regulations.

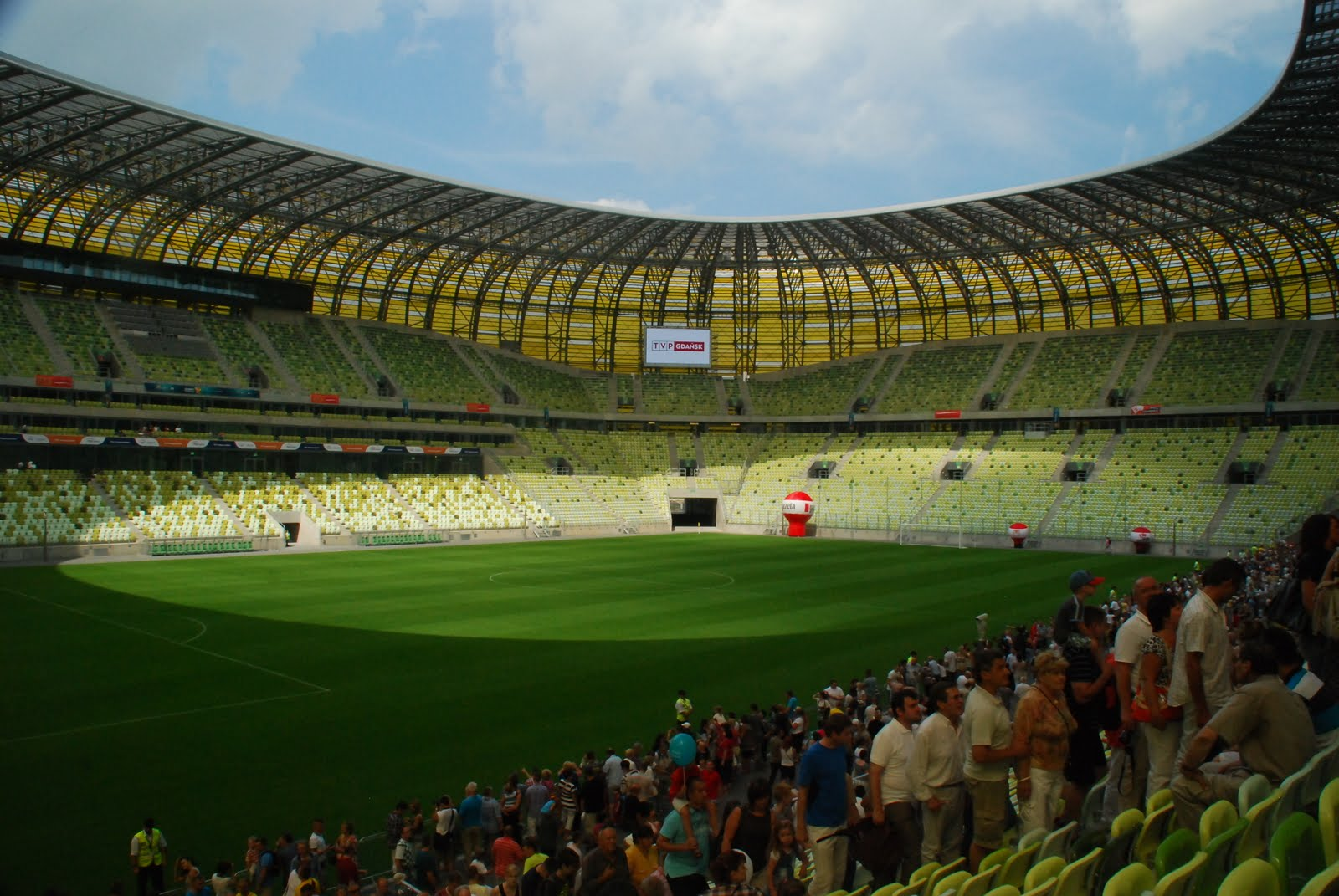
Full interior of the Stadion Gdańsk.

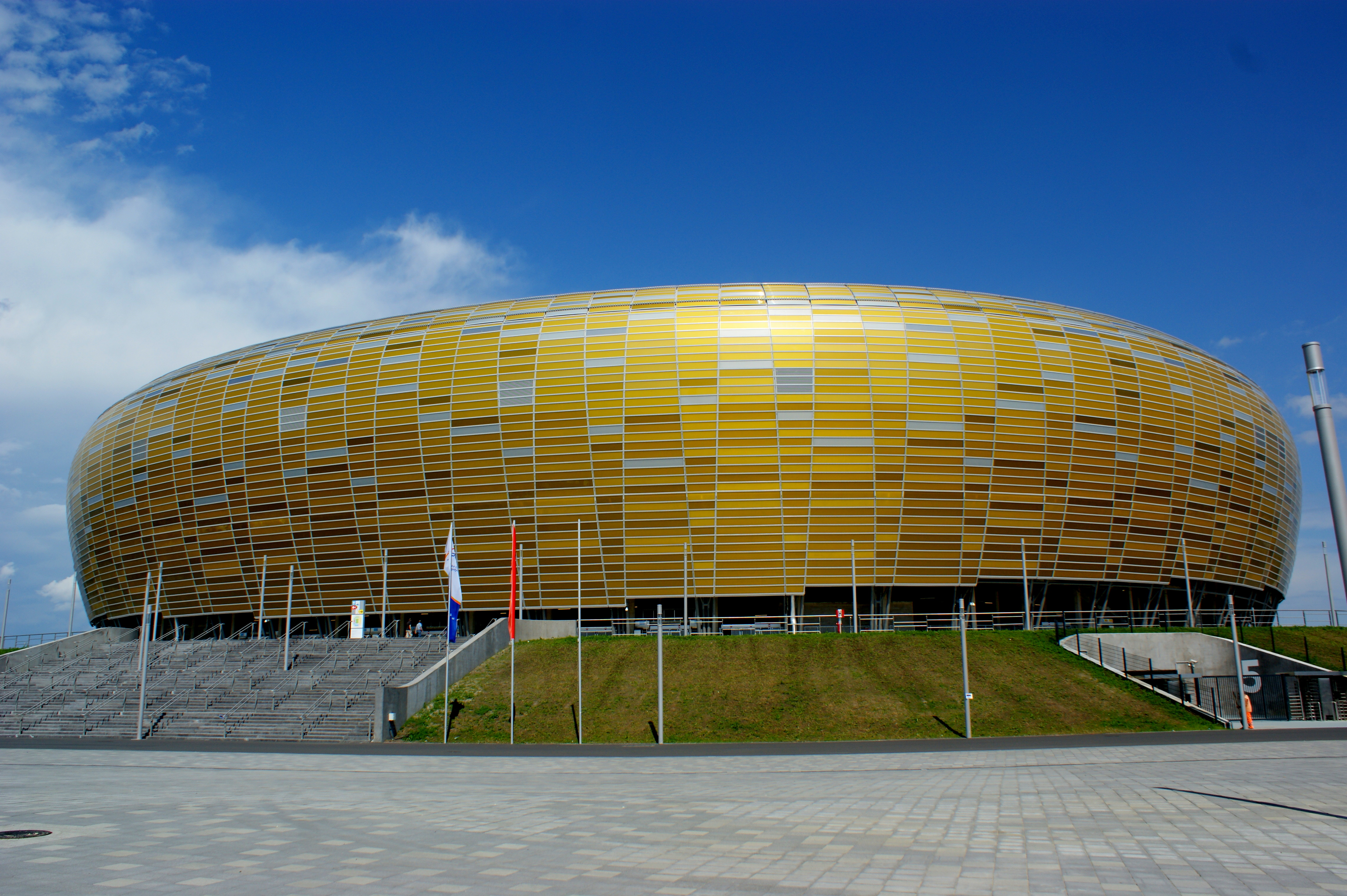
Exterior of the Stadion Gdańsk

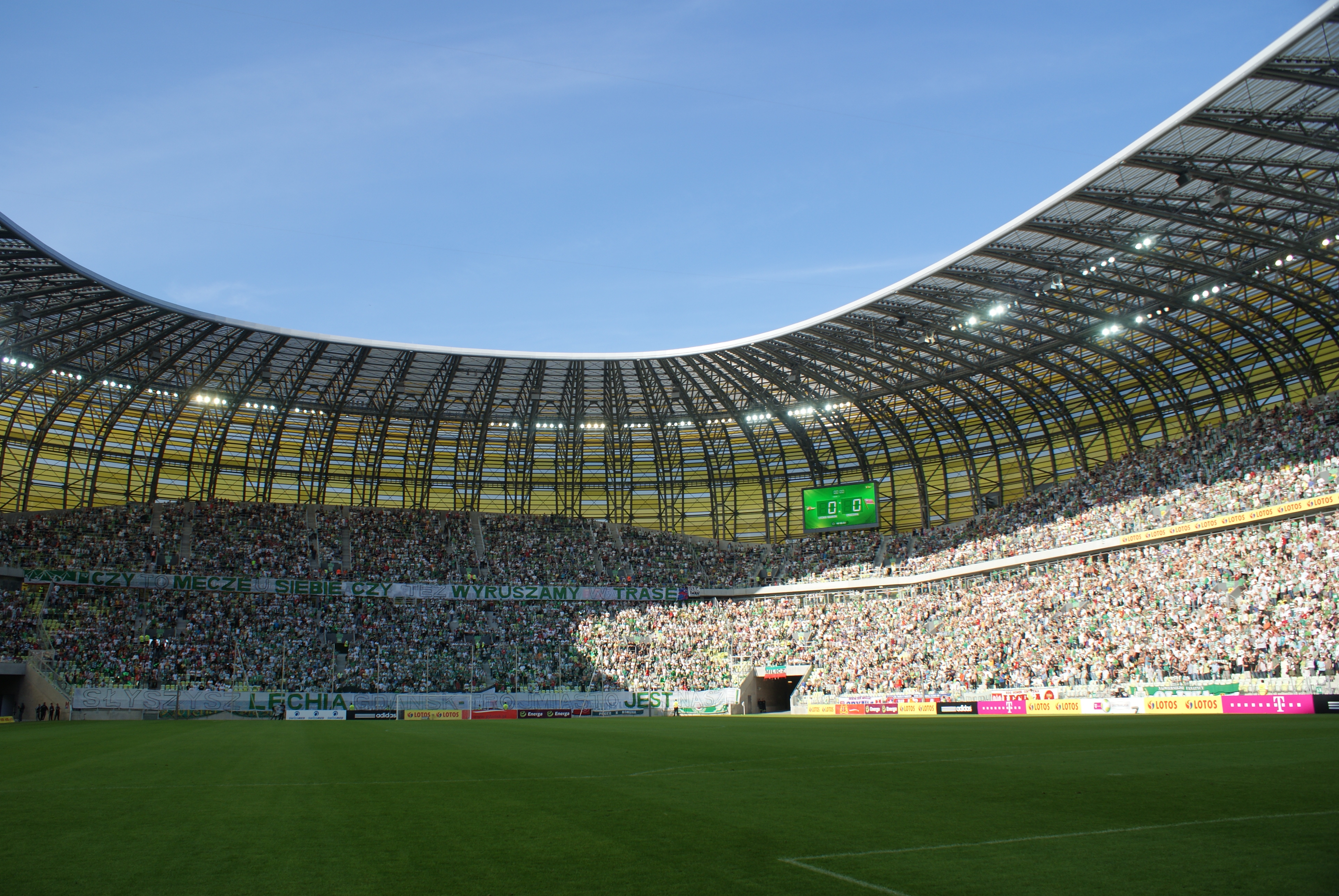
The first competitive game at the stadium; Lechia Gdańsk vs Cracovia (Aug 14, 2011) ended in 1–1 draw.

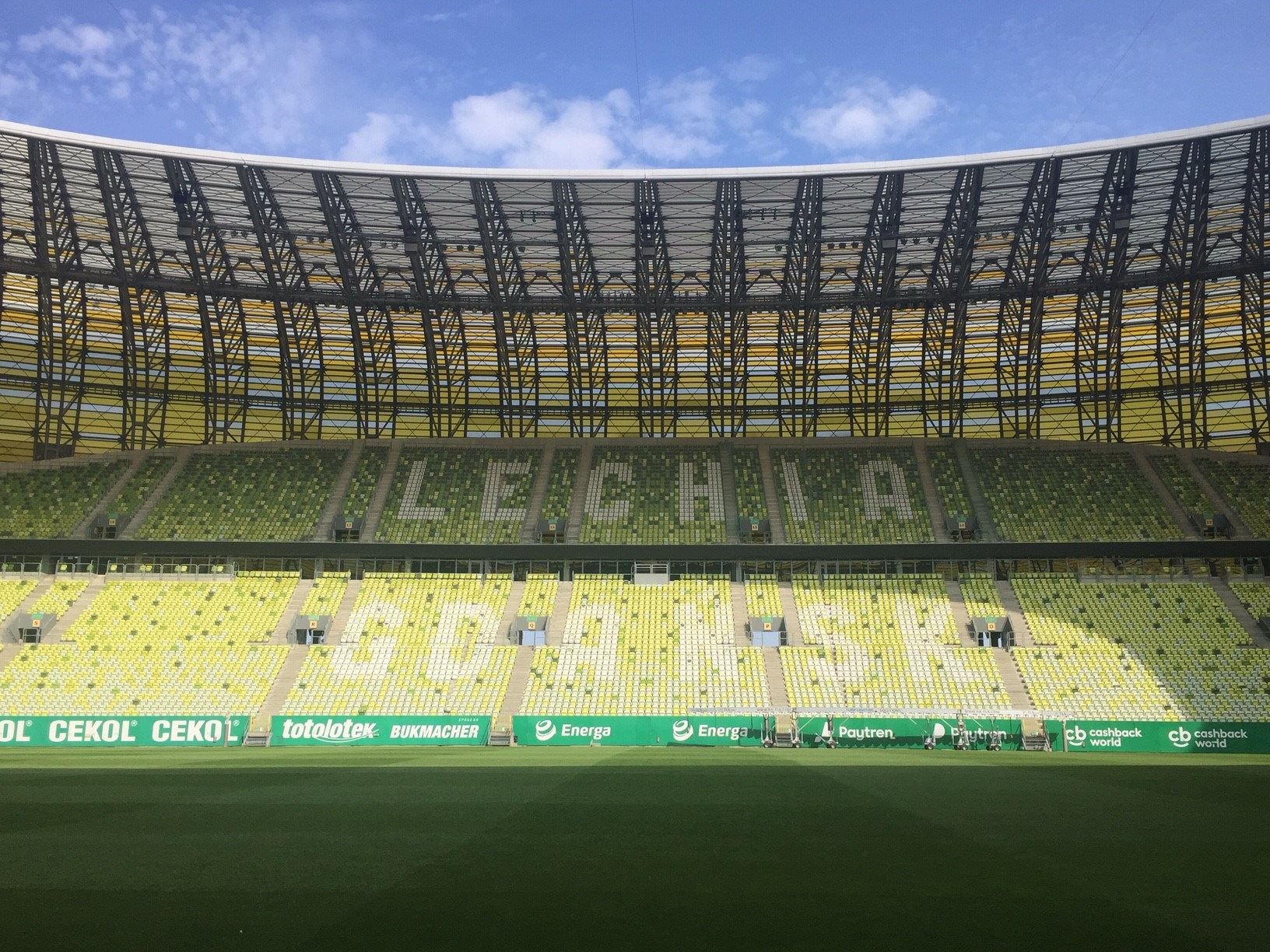
The "Lechia Gdańsk" made out of the seats in the eastern stand.

=== MOSiR Stadium / Gdańsk Sports Center Stadium ===
The Lechia Gdańsk stadium from 1945 to 2011 was the MOSiR Stadium. In 2000 the ownership of the stadium changed from MOSiR to Gdańsk Sports Center, also seeing a change in the stadiums name. Now it's officially known as Gdańsk Sports Center Stadium, the Lechia Gdańsk Stadion or simply the Lechia Stadion but has often been called by Lechia fans, Traugutta or Traugutta 29, the street and address of the stadium. The stadium is most well known for the European Cup game against Juventus where around 40,000 fans attended the game, just over three times more than the capacity of 12,244. Since Lechia moved to the Stadion Energa Gdańsk the stadium has been used for first team training, matches for the Lechia Gdańsk Ladies team, the Lechia Gdańsk II team, and formerly also held games for the Lechia Gdańsk rugby team.

==== Avenue of Stars ====
At the MOSiR Stadium Lechia have an "Avenue of Stars" which commemorates the efforts and success of former players and coaches. There are currently 21 players with stars at the stadium, including all-time top goalscorer, Roman Rogocz, and all-time appearance maker, Zdzisław Puszkarz. Due to MOSiR becoming the training ground in 2011 after the move to the PGE Arena Gdańsk there have been calls for the stars to be moved due to the new stadium by some fans, while others see the stadium as the historic home of Lechia Gdańsk and the perfect place to keep the players' commemorative stars.

The players who have a star to commemorate their time with Lechia Gdańsk are Jerzy Apolewicz, Michał Globisz, Józef Gładysz, Andrzej Głownia, Henryk Gronowski, Robert Gronowski, Jerzy Jastrzębowski, Bogusław Kaczmarek, Alfred Kokot, Henryk Kokot, Roman Korynt, Jerzy Kruszczyński, Lech Kulwicki, Hubert Kusz, Władysław Musiał, Ryszard Polak, Zdzisław Puszkarz, Andrzej Salach, Jakub Smug, Roman Rogocz, Zbigniew Żemojtel.

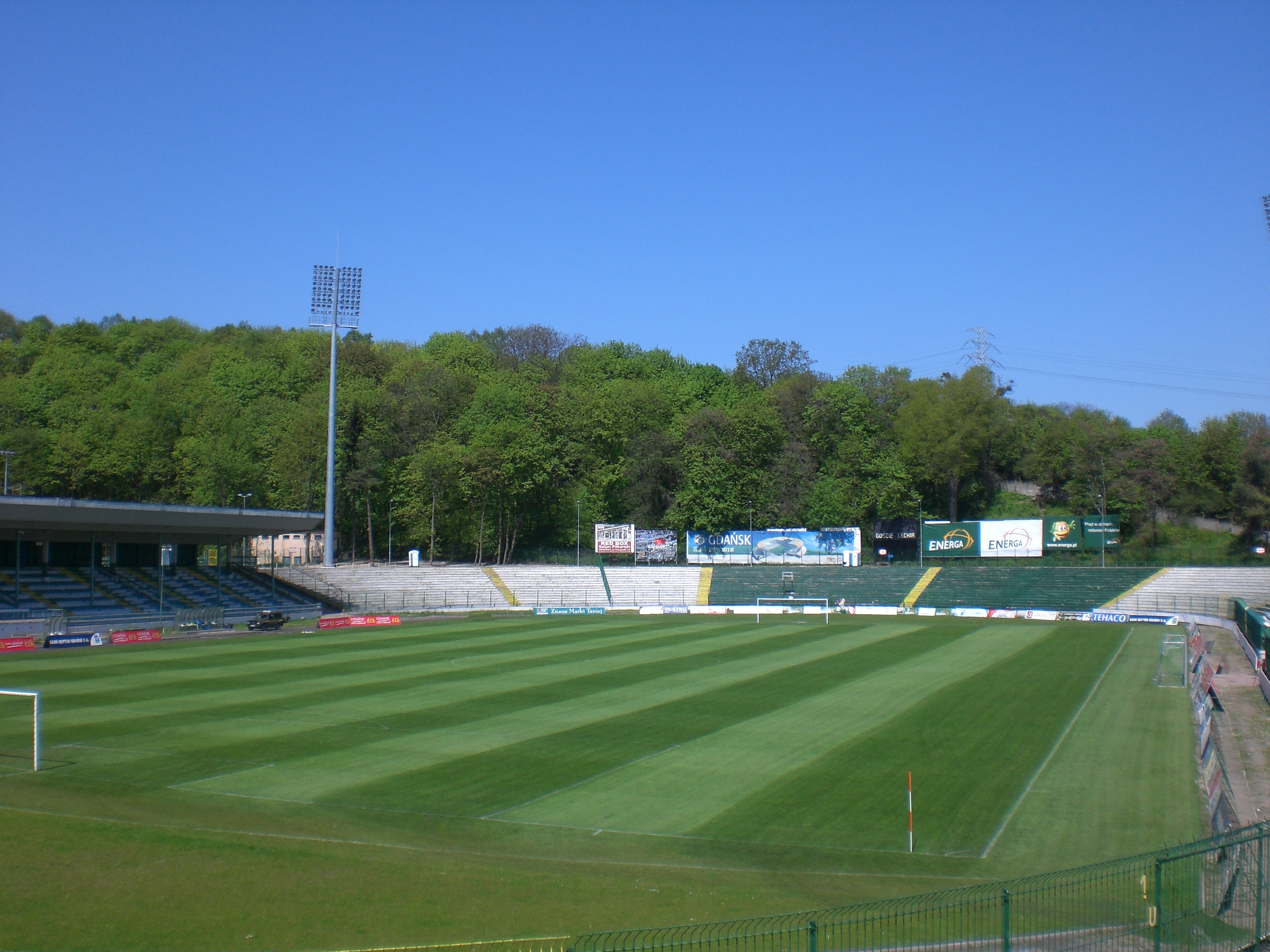
MOSiR Stadium with the main stand on the left.

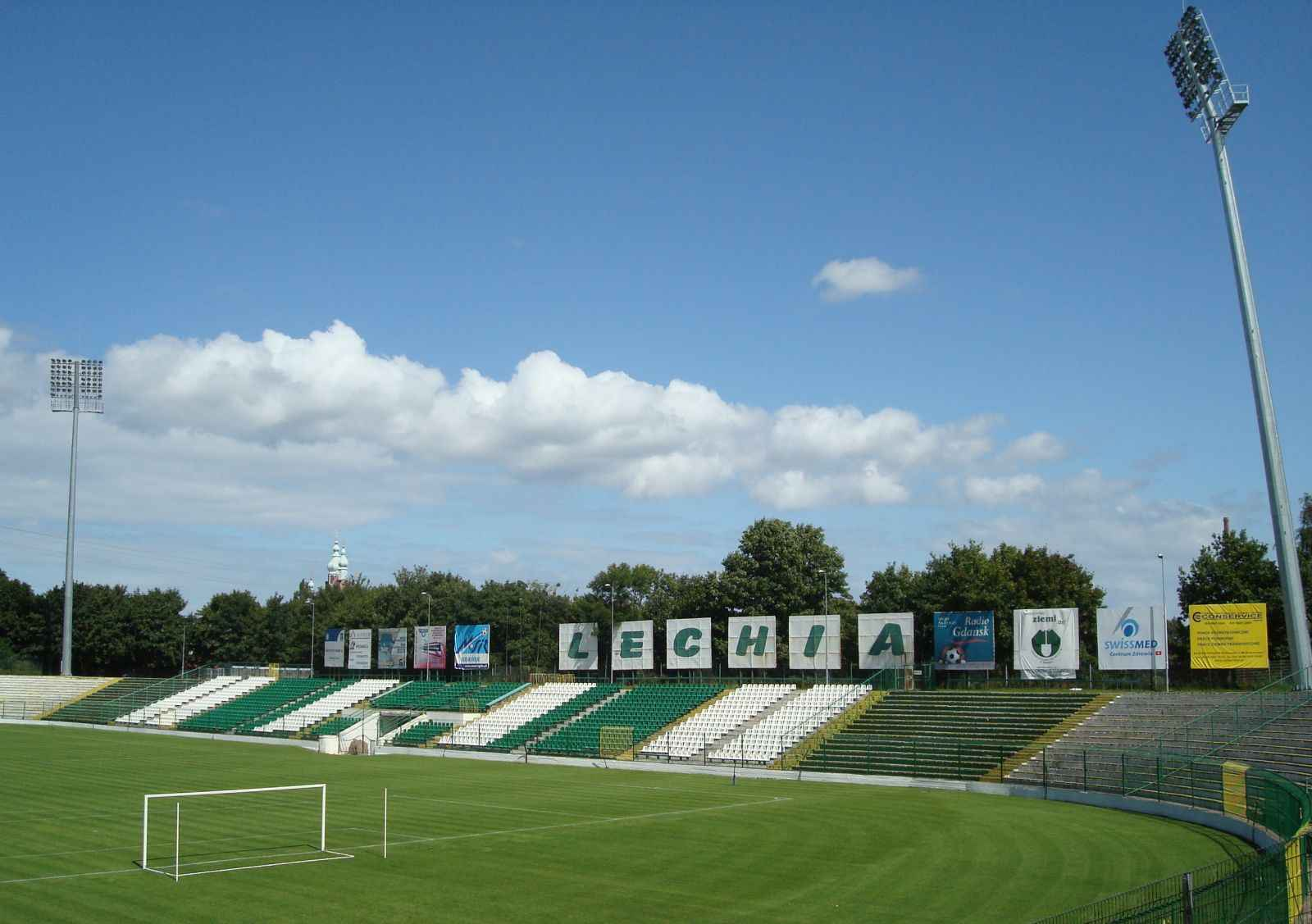
The famous "Lechia" signs on the eastern stand.

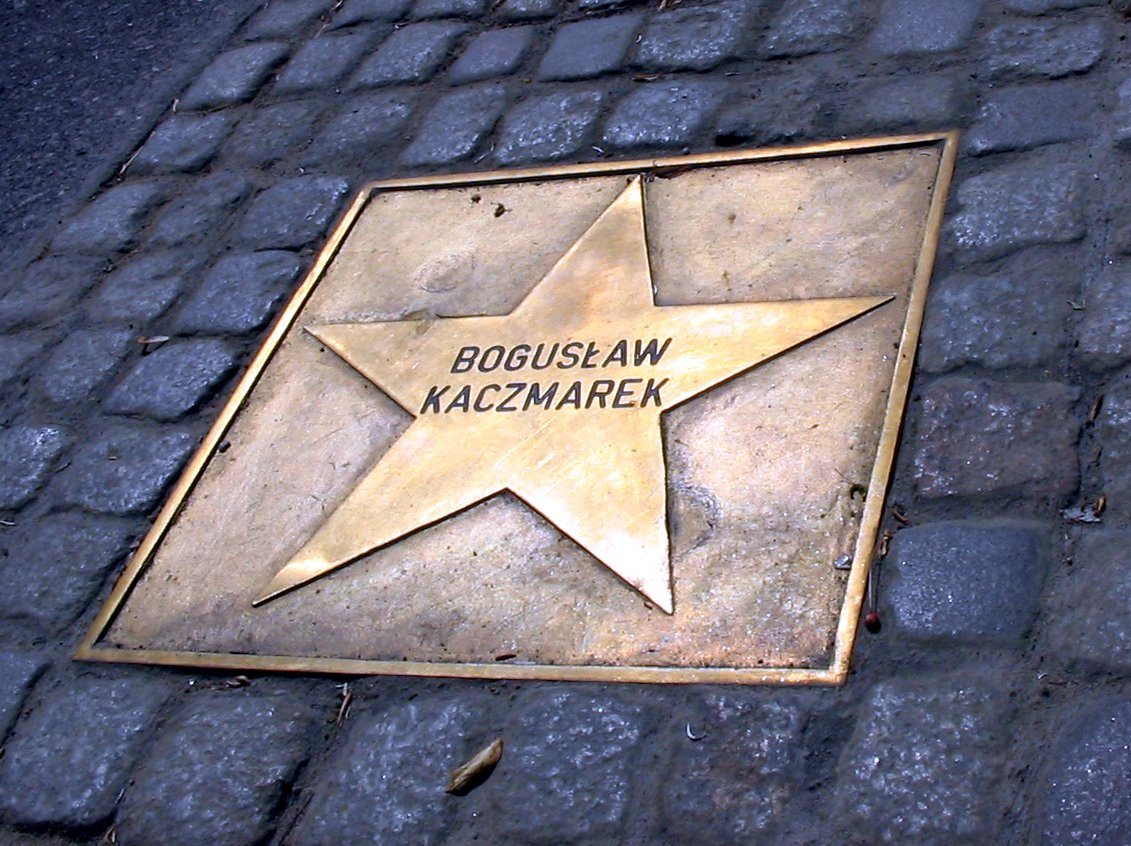
Bogusław Kaczmarek's star on the "Avenue of Stars".

=== Attendance ===
Attendance statistics since the start of the 2011–12 season after the club moved to the Stadion Energa Gdańsk.

Season	Highest	Opposition	Date	Lowest	Opposition	Date		Average
2011–12	34444	Cracovia	14 August 2011	10525	Podbeskidzie	24 March 2012		17372
2012–13	19415	Śląsk Wrocław	21 October 2012	8000	Korona Kielce	11 March 2013		13219
2013–14	24276	Górnik Zabrze	30 August 2013	7705	Piast Gliwice	29 March 2014		12844
2014–15	36500	Legia Warsaw	11 April 2015	7619	Piast Gliwice	7 December 2014		16608
2015–16	22415	Legia Warsaw	11 May 2016	8827	Śląsk Wrocław	6 December 2015		11569
2016–17	37220	Legia Warsaw	19 March 2017	10009	Nieciecza	29 April 2017		17531
2017–18	22871	Arka Gdynia	7 April 2018	2235	Nieciecza	27 February 2018		10640
2018–19	25066	Arka Gdynia	27 October 2018	8769	Wisła Płock	11 March 2019		14746
2019–20 (Note: It was announced on 10 March that the games against Arka Gdynia and Cracovia would be played behind closed doors and the games in the championship round against Piast Gliwice, Cracovia and Legia Warsaw will be played with crowd restrictions due to the coronavirus pandemic. However these games did not go ahead as all league games were postponed indefinitely on 14 March. The attendance stats for this season includes the home games where fans were not allowed to attend.)	14008	Lech Poznań	14 September 2019	0 (Note: Due to restrictions imposed by the Polish government in reaction to the coronavirus outbreak there were no fans in attendance for the home games against Arka Gdynia and Cracovia.)	Arka Gdynia & Cracovia	31 March 2020 & 9 June 2020	–	8110
2020–21 (Note: Due to the COVID-19 pandemic this season saw the league being cut to a 30 game season with the removal of the relegation and championship groups. Of the 30 games, fans were only in attendance for 6 games, including Lechia only being able to have fans at 3 games that season, with no fans allowed to attend home games from October 2020 until the end of the season.)	5424	Raków Częstochowa	29 August 2020	0	12 games	All games from October 2020	–	987
2021–22	23574	Legia Warsaw	3 October 2021	4677	BBT Nieciecza	19 March 2022		8787

- All of the released attendance figures for Lechia Gdańsk before the 2011-12 Ekstraklasa season were rounded to the nearest 500.

†Season still in progress.

== Colours, badges and banners ==
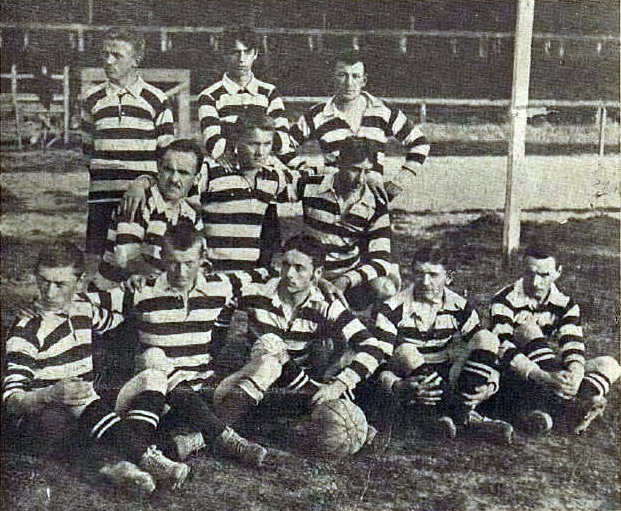
Lechia Lwów (1909). Lechia Gdańsk have worn Lechia Lwów's green and white stripes for 2006/07, 2009/10, and continuously since 2015

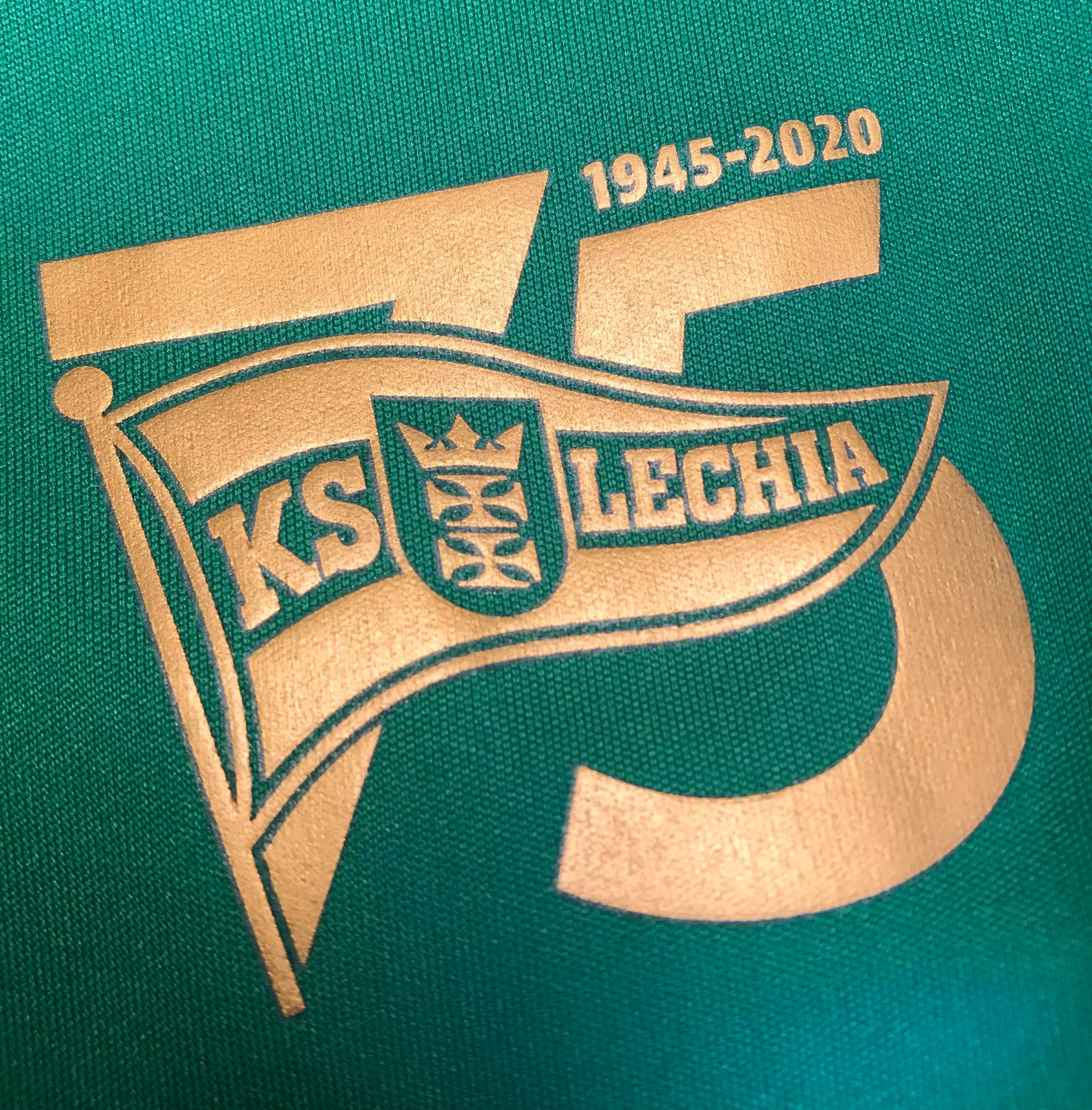
Badge used by Lechia Gdansk on the 75th anniversary kits in 2020

=== Kit history ===
Lechia Gdańsk's colours have always been green and white. In the first years of the club, Lechia wore green shirts with white shorts and either green or white socks. Predominantly throughout Lechias history the team has worn all green shirts, however, there were a few seasons in which Lechia wore white as their home colours. During the 1960–61 season, Lechia wore green and white stripes for the first time. It was this season when the Lechia badge featured on the shirts for the first time, however, the badge did not return to the Lechia shirts until the 1996–97 season. After that season Lechia wore all green shirts until the 2002–03 season when Lechia wore an all-white kit. 2006–07 saw for the first time in Lechia's history the team wore an all-white kit with green hoops on the shirt, the same colours worn by Lechia Lwów, from which the expelled fans after WW2 created Lechia Gdańsk. Since the turn of the century, Lechia has been more creative with their designs for the home kits. From the team wearing all green home shirts from 1960 to 2002, there has since been a return of the green and white stripes for the 2011–12 season, an all-white kit with a green sash on the front for the 2012–14 seasons, as well as the hooped design, which was first worn in the 2006–07, and has since been worn during the 2008–10 seasons, and continuously since the 2015–16 season. The only time in Lechia's early history when the club deviated from their traditional white or green was in the 1982–83 Polish Cup final when the team wore white shirts, red shorts, and white socks, colours reminiscent of the Poland national team.

During Lechia's history, the away shirt colours have often always been the opposite of the home shirt. When the home shirt was green, the away was white, and vice versa. 2009 saw the introduction of Lechia's first non-white/green kit, with an all-black away kit introduced. Lechia released an all red third shirt for the 2014–15 season, with an all-red kit being used as the club's away or third colours from 2014 to 2020. The 2018–19 season saw the introduction of another previously unused colour for a kit. Lechia wore an all-grey away kit for that season, replacing the all green kit which had been the away kit for the previous season. This grey kit was used by the team from 2018 to 2022 and was notably worn by Lechia in two cup finals.

While white and green have always been the club's home colours, Lechia have not always worn these colours while playing at home. On 9 February 2019 Lechia wore an all-black kit for their home game against Pogoń Szczecin to commemorate the death of Paweł Adamowicz, the mayor of Gdańsk at the time of his murder, and a lifelong Lechia fan. This was the first time in their history a predominantly green or white kit was not worn by Lechia for a home game. The game finished 2–1 to Lechia, with goals from Filip Mladenović and Flávio Paixão. An all-red kit was worn on 10 November 2019, again against Pogoń Szczecin, to commemorate the 101st anniversary of Polish independence,. That same match Lechia attempted to break the Polish record for most people singing the full Polish national anthem at the same time, which was 3,171 people, breaking the record with 7,614.

=== Badge history ===
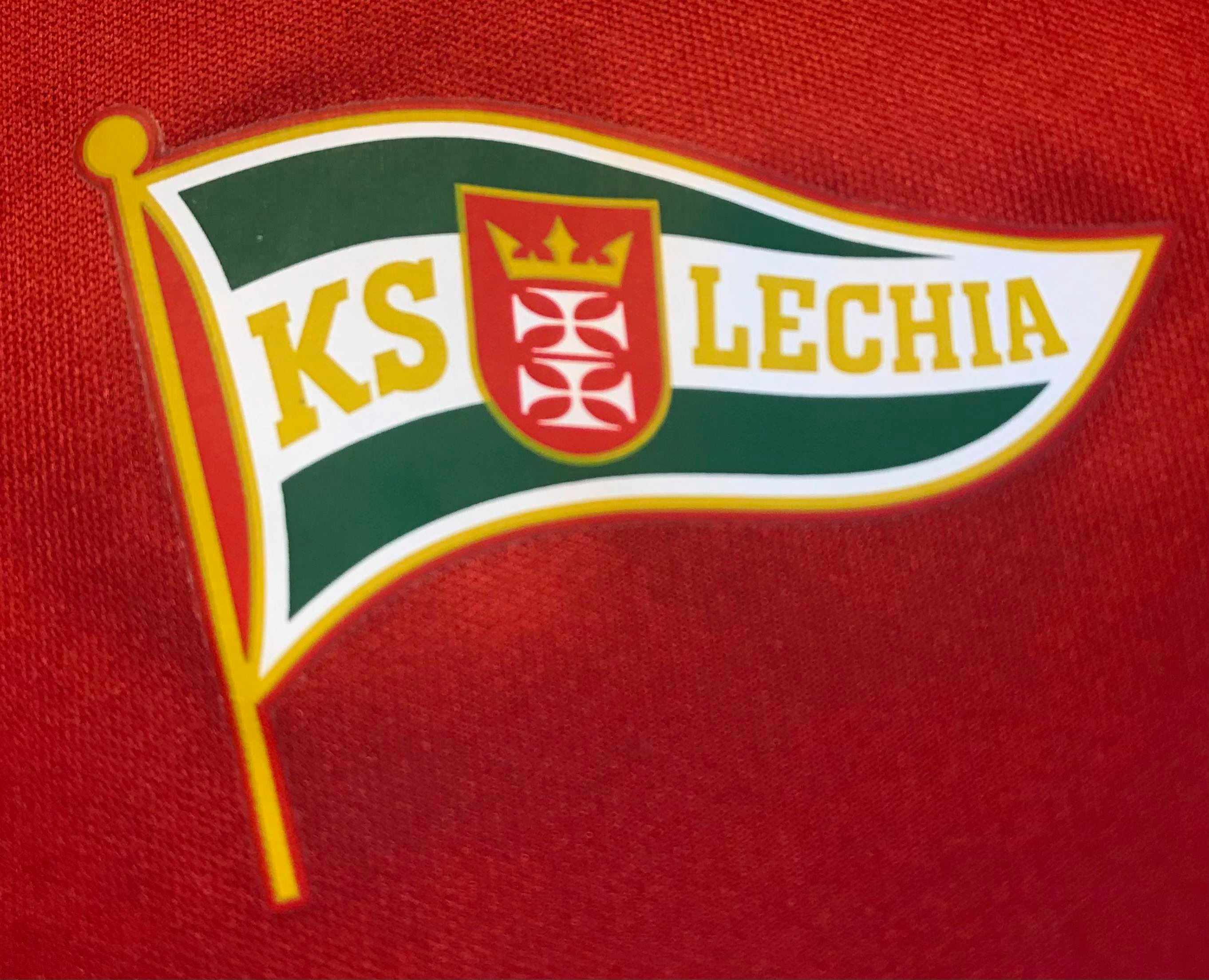
This badge style has been used by Lechia Gdansk since 2016, with this photo being taken of the badge on the 2017–19 third shirt

The badge design of Lechia has stayed roughly the same since 1945 with only slight changes when the club's name changed or when Lechia had a merger with another club. The design of the Lechia badge has always been a triangular pennant with the flagpole on the left. The flag has always been green, with a white horizontal stripe through the middle, and the symbol of Gdańsk coat of arms in the centre. The name "Lechia" has always featured on the badge. In 1995 Lechia experienced a major change to their official club badge. The merger with Olimpia Poznan saw the flag featured in a circle with "Olimpia–Lechia Gdansk" featured at the bottom. A similar thing happened again when Lechia experienced a merger with Polonia Gdańsk in 1998. After the Polonia merger broke up in 2001, Lechia returned once again to their normal badge design, which has been used continuously since then with only minor changes in 2016.

The badge was often not worn on the shirts. They were first worn on the kits in 1960, with a return in 1963. After the 1963–64 season the badges did not reappear again until 1996 but have featured on every shirt since. The first symbol to appear on a Lechia shirt was a large white "L" which featured on the shirts for the 1947–48 season.

=== Banners ===
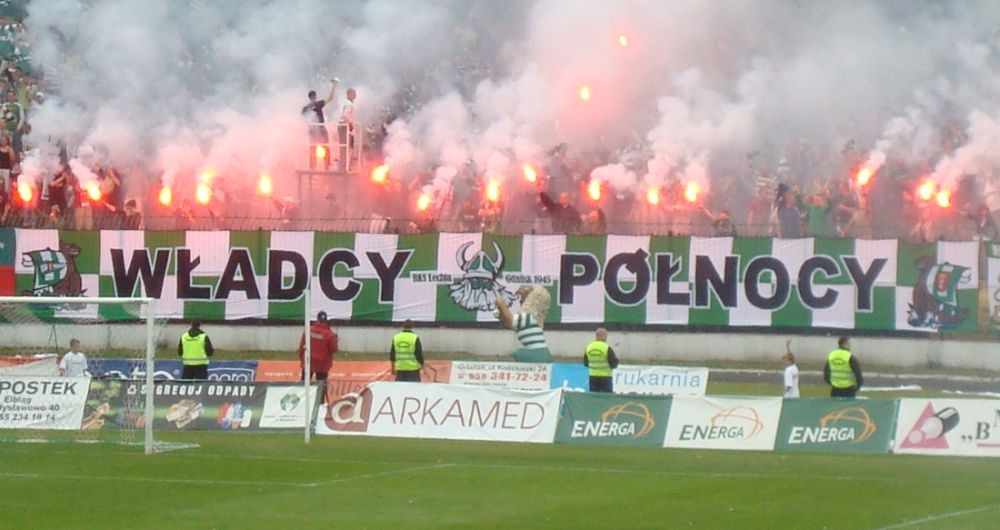
The "Władcy Północy" has been displayed at Lechia Gdańsk games since 2007.

Banners first started to appear at Lechia's MOSiR Stadium in the 1980s with the first Lechia banners made and displayed being "'Lechia Pany!" (as is the case with most flags and banners, it is stylised in all capitals) and "Lechia Karwiny" (Karwiny being a district in Gdynia). Other older flags that make regular appearances in Lechia games are those displaying "Forza Lechia", "Lechia Pride of Gdańsk", "Biało-Zieloni", and "Lechia Gdańsk Forever". Banners have been used to display support for the team, show where the fans are from (such as the English fan club, Malbork, Sopot, etc.), political statements, and support for friendly teams (such as Śląsk Wrocław, Gryf Słupsk, and formerly Wisła Kraków). Over the years some of the older flags displayed have been damaged, stolen, or remade. Many flags were stored by the Lechia Ultra's in a warehouse which was broken into and the flags stolen, leaving only those stored elsewhere, or kept by individuals, to survive the raid, while many of the older flags have been damaged through wear and tear, complications with storage, and simply through age. Many iconic flags for the fans throughout the club's history have often been remade due to age, these include the remaking of the original flags showing the Gdańsk districts, such as "Chełm", "Orunia", "Oliwa", and "Morena". In total over 300 flags and banners have been documented throughout Lechia's history.

The stealing of banners can give ultra groups a sense of prestige and a higher status and standing among ultra groups from other clubs. Once instance of Lechia stealing a flag was in 2007 when Lechia fans stole a "Władcy Północy" banner belonging to Arka Gdynia. During the Tricity Derby that season the Lechia fans showed disrespect to Arka by hanging the banner upside down before setting the banner on fire. After the banner had been burned the fans revealed their own version of the "Władcy Północy", in the same style as the Arka banner, but in white and green instead of blue and yellow. The Lechia "Władcy Północy" banner has featured predominantly at home games since 2007.

== Records and statistics ==
=== All-time ===
- First ever game: 2 September 1945, Milicyjny Klube Sportowy Wrzeszcz, 4–6
- First ever win: 9 September 1945, Wojskowy Klub Sportowy, 9–1
- Biggest win: 11 May 2000, LKS Waplewo – 15–0
- Biggest defeat: 13 November 1949, Polonia Bytom – 8–0
- Highest scoring game: 11 May 2000, LKS Waplewo – 15–0
- Most goals in a game: 20 September 1945, Stanisław Baran vs Wojskowy Klub Sportowy – 7 goals
- Most total goals in a season: Bartłomiej Stolc – 2001–02 season – 40 goals
- Most league goals in a season: Bartłomiej Stolc – 2002–03 season – 34 goals
- Most league goals in a season: (top three divisions) Jerzy Kruszczyński 1983–84 season – 31 goals
- Most league goals for Lechia Gdańsk: Flávio Paixão – 85 goals
- Most goals in all competitions for Lechia Gdańsk: Roman Rogocz – 109 goals
- Most apps for Lechia Gdańsk: Zdzisław Puszkarz – 325 apps
- Highest transfer fee paid: Daniel Łukasik, 2014 – PLN 3.75 million (£720k, €800k)
- Highest transfer fee received: Vanja Milinković-Savić, 2017 – PLN 10.5 million (£2.34 million, €2.6 million)

=== Ekstraklasa ===
- Debut match in Ekstraklasa: March 20, 1949, Cracovia – Lechia Gdańsk 5–1
- First win in Ekstraklasa: March 27, 1949, Lechia Gdańsk – Ruch Chorzów 5–3
- Most Lechia goals in the Ekstraklasa: Flávio Paixão – 85 goals
- Most Lechia apps in the Ekstraklasa: Flávio Paixão – 239 apps

=== Individual achievements ===
- League top goalscorer: Jerzy Kruszczyński (1983–84 – II Liga) – 31 goals
- League top goalscorer: Marco Paixão (2016–17 – Ekstraklasa) – 18 goals
- Most different leagues played in for Lechia Mateusz Bąk (2000–2010, 2013–17) 6 different divisions – Klasa A group Gdańsk IV (sixth tier), Liga okręgowa group Gdańsk II (fifth tier), IV liga group Pomorska (fourth tier), III liga group II (third tier), II liga (second tier), Ekstraklasa (first tier).
- Most promotions with Lechia: Mateusz Bąk (2000–10, 2013–17) 5 promotions – sixth tier to first tier.
- First non-Polish player: Sargis Khachatryan (Armenia) – Debut: 13 May 1993

=== Stadium statistics ===
- Last game at the MOSiR Stadium Gdańsk: May 29, 2011, Zagłębie Lubin, 1–2
- Last win at the MOSiR Stadium Gdańsk: May 22, 2011, Lech Poznań, 2–1
- Last Lechia goalscorer at the MOSiR Stadium Gdańsk: May 29, 2011, Abdou Razack Traoré
- First game at the Stadion Energa Gdańsk: August 14, 2011, Cracovia, 1–1
- First win at the Stadion Energa Gdańsk: September 12, 2011, Górnik Zabrze, 2–1
- First Lechia goalscorer at the Stadion Energa Gdańsk: August 14, 2011, Fred Benson
- Highest attendance: September 29, 1983, Juventus, UEFA Cup Winners Cup – 40,000 (estimate)

=== Player statistics ===
The top ten most appearances and goal scorers for Lechia Gdańsk.

(Stats correct as of 14 June 2023)

Apps
No.	Name	Apps
1	Zdzisław Puszkarz	342
2	Roman Korynt	340
3	Andrzej Salach	337
4	Czesław Nowicki	288
5	Marek Ługowski	273
6	Henryk Gronowski	273
7	Flávio Paixão	266
8	Jerzy Apolewicz	260
9	Piotr Wiśniewski	260
10	Mateusz Bąk	237

Goals
No.	Name	Goals
1	Roman Rogocz	109
2	Flávio Paixão	96
3	Bartłomiej Stolc	81
4	Bogdan Adamczyk	78
5	Zdzisław Puszkarz	61
6	Robert Gronowski	59
7	Jerzy Apolewicz	57
8	Marek Wasicki	52
9	Leszek Goździk	51
10	Alfred Kokot	49

== Club sponsors and kit manufacturers ==
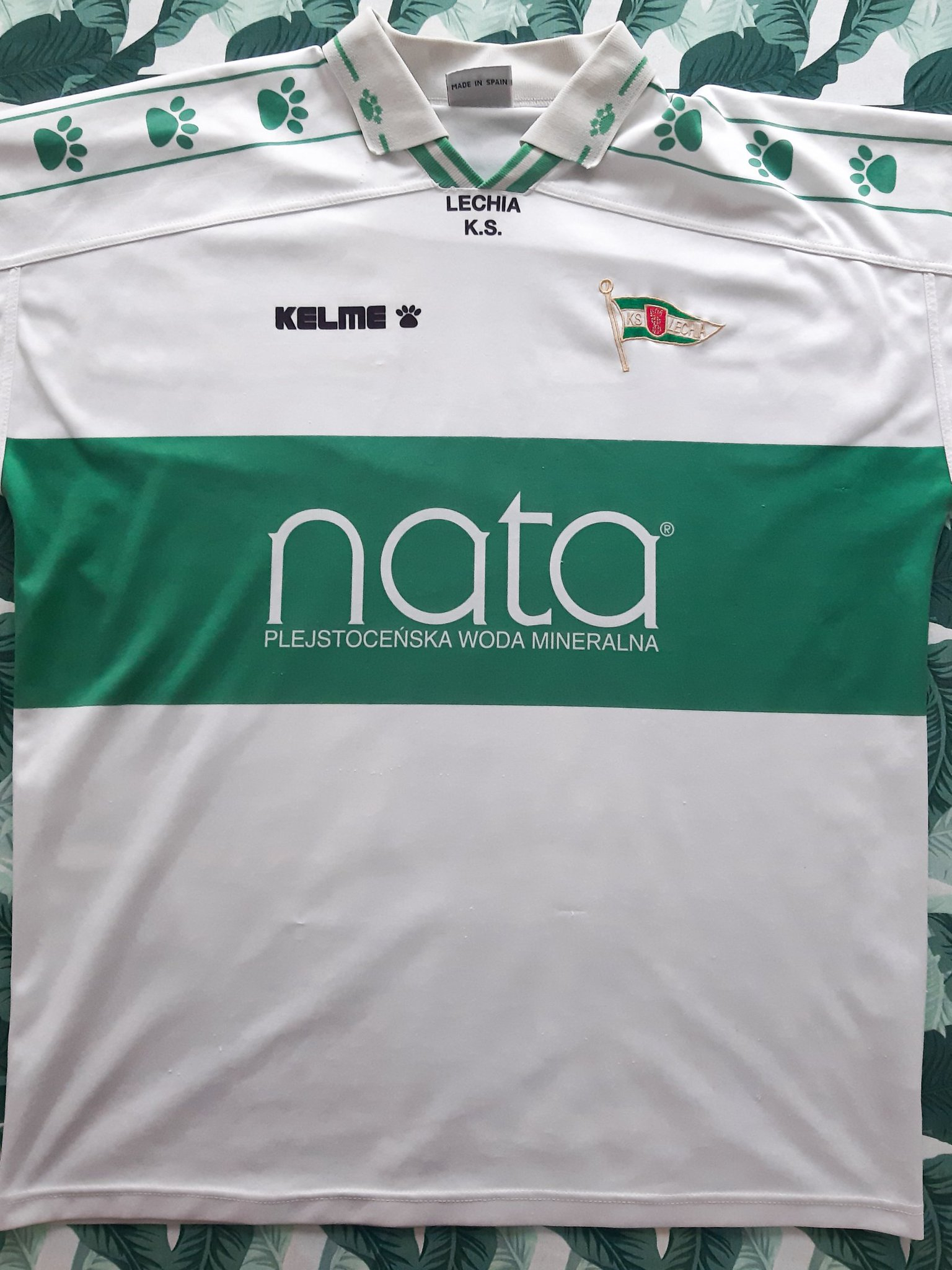
The shirt design used by OLG (1996), Lechia Gdańsk (1996–98), and LPG (1999–2000). Manufactured by Kelme, sponsored by Nata.§

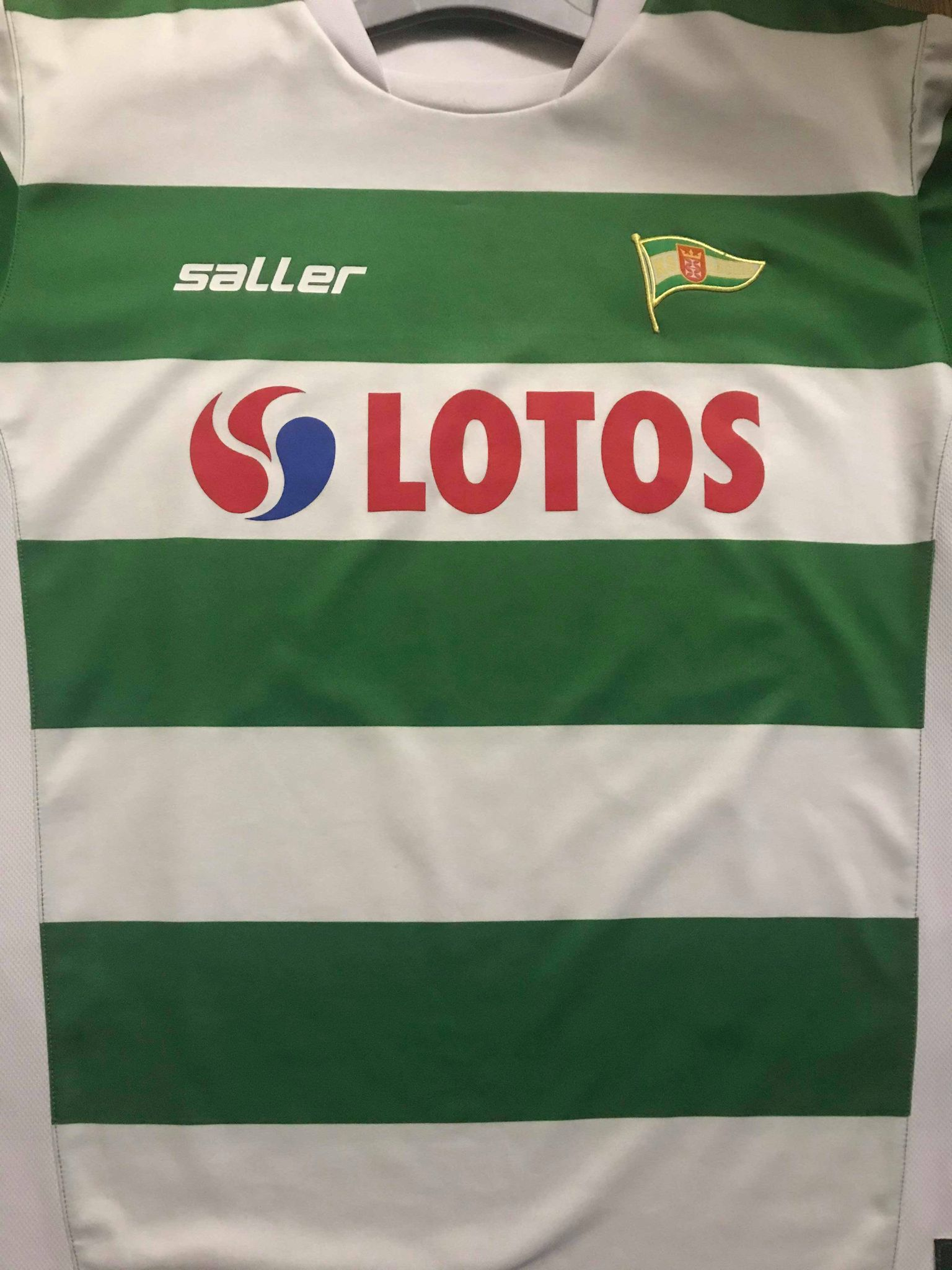
The 2015–16 Lechia Gdańsk home shirt, manufactured by Sport-Saller, sponsored by Lotos.

Seasons	Sponsor(s)		Kit manufacturers	Notes
Seasons	Front of shirt	Back of shirt	Kit manufacturers	Notes
1983–1984	No sponsor	No sponsor	maSport	Lechia Gdańsk
1984–1987	No sponsor	No sponsor	Umbro	Lechia Gdańsk
1987–1989	No sponsor	No sponsor	unknown	Lechia Gdańsk
1989–1995	No sponsor	No sponsor	Self-made	Lechia Gdańsk
1995–1996†	Nata	No sponsor	PJ Sport	Olimpia-Lechia Gdańsk
1995–1996†	Canal+	No sponsor	Kelme	Olimpia-Lechia Gdańsk
1995–1996†	Olvit	No sponsor	Self-made	Lechia Gdańsk
1996–1998	Nata	No sponsor	Kelme	Lechia Gdańsk
1998–1999	Pomorskie Towarzystwo Leasingowe (PTL)	No sponsor	Uhlsport	Lechia-Polonia Gdańsk
1999–2000‡	PTL	No sponsor	Uhlsport	Lechia-Polonia Gdańsk
1999–2000‡	Centertel	Polsat	Tico	Lechia-Polonia Gdańsk
1999–2000‡	Nata	No sponsor	Kelme	Lechia-Polonia Gdańsk
2000–2002	Centertel & Canal+	Netia	Adidas	Lechia-Polonia Gdańsk
2001	Polteam	No sponsor	Self-made	Lechia Gdańsk
2001–2004	No sponsor	No sponsor	wit-sport	Lechia Gdańsk
2003	Biznes Partner Klub	Achilles	Erima	Lechia Gdańsk
2004	No sponsor	No sponsor	Self-made	Lechia Gdańsk
2004–2005	GPEC	www.gdansk.pl	Legea	Lechia Gdańsk
2005–2006	GPEC	www.gdansk.pl	Erreà	Lechia Gdańsk
2006–2007	SNG	www.gdansk.pl	Jako	Lechia Gdańsk
2007–2008	SNG & Energa	www.gdansk.pl	Jako	Lechia Gdańsk
2008–2010	SNG & Energa	No sponsor	Jako	Lechia Gdańsk
2010–2011	Lotos	No sponsor	Adidas	Lechia Gdańsk
2011–2012	Lotos	www.gdansk.pl	Adidas	Lechia Gdańsk
2012–2014	Lotos	Energa	Adidas	Lechia Gdańsk
2014–2016	Lotos	Energa	Sport-Saller	Lechia Gdańsk
2016	ETL Group	Totolotek	New Balance	Lechia Gdańsk
2016–2019	Energa	Totolotek	New Balance	Lechia Gdańsk
2019–2020	Energa & Paytren	Betclic	New Balance	Lechia Gdańsk
2020–2021	Energa | Grupa Orlen & Paytren	No sponsor	New Balance	Lechia Gdańsk
2021	Energa | Grupa Orlen	No sponsor	New Balance	Lechia Gdańsk
2021–2022	Energa | Grupa Orlen & eToro	eToro	New Balance	Lechia Gdańsk
2022–2023	eToro	Energa | Grupa Orlen	Adidas	Lechia Gdańsk
2023–	No sponsor	No sponsor	Adidas	Lechia Gdańsk

Sometimes there is an overlap between the years and when there are different club sponsors and kit manufacturers. This is due to the fact that in the late 1990s and early 2000s it was common for Lechia to wear multiple kits made by different manufactures in the same season. For example, during the 2003–04 season Lechia wore kits manufactured by wit-sport, Legea, Erima, and kits that were self-made.

Notes

† During the 1995–96 season the Olimpia-Lechia team started the season with kids being made by local kit manufacturer PJ Sport and with the team sponsor being Nata. During the winter break Kelme took over as kit manufacturer and Canal+ became the team's main sponsor.

‡ During the 1999–2000 season the Lechia-Polonia team used four different kits made by three different manufacturers. With each different manufactured kit Lechia had a different sponsor on the front of that shirt.

§ This design was the only one worn by the three teams that have played under the Lechia Gdańsk name. This particular shirt shown was worn by Lechia Gdańsk between 1996 and 1998. When this design was worn by Olimpia-Lechia in 1996 it was with Canal+ sponsorship and not with the Nata sponsorship.

== Honours ==
=== League ===
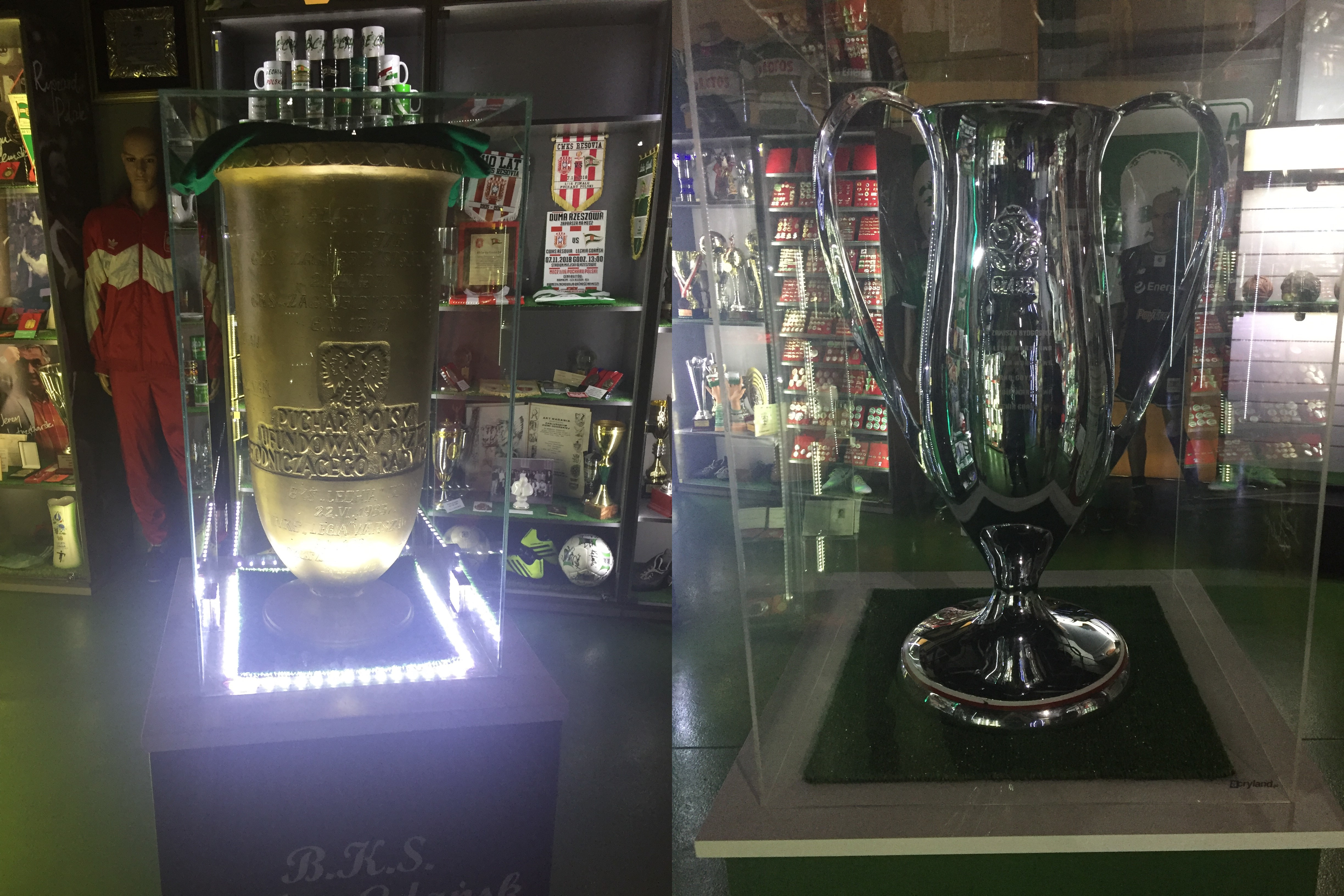
The Polish Cups won by Lechia Gdańsk: 1983 (left) & 2019 (right).

- Ekstraklasa
  - Third place: 1956, 2018–19
- I liga
  - Champions: 1951, 1983–84, 2007–08, 2023–24
  - Runners-up: 1954, 1974–75, 1975–76, 1977–78
  - Third place: 1978–79
- II liga
  - Champions: 1971–72, 1982–83, 2004–05
  - Runners-up: 1967–68, 1970–71
  - Third place: 1969–70, 1997–98

=== Cup ===
- Polish Cup
  - Winners: 1982–83, 2018–19
  - Runners-up: 1955, 2019–20
- Polish Super Cup:
  - Winners: 1983, 2019

=== Europe ===
- European Cup Winners Cup:
  - First round: 1983–84
- Europa League
  - Second qualifying round: 2019–20

=== Indoor football ===
- Amber Cup
  - Winners: 2011, 2013, 2016, 2017
  - Runners-up: 2012
  - Third place: 2015

== League participation ==
As of the 2026–27 season.

Tier	Years	Seasons
I	1949, 1952–53, 1955–63, 1984–88, 1995–96, 2008–2023, 2024–2026	33
II	1946–48, 1950–51, 1954, 1963–67, 1972–82, 1983–84, 1988–95, 1996–97, 1998–2001, 2005–08, 2023–2024, 2026–	37
III	1945–46, 1967–72, 1982–83, 1997–98, 2004–05	9
IV	2003–04	1
V	2002–03	1
VI	2001–02	1

== Lechia in Europe ==
Season	Competition	Round	Club	Home	Away	Agg.
1983–84	European Cup Winners' Cup	First round	(Italy) Juventus	2–3	0–7	2–10
2019–20	Europa League	Second qualifying round	(Denmark) Brøndby	2–1	1–4	3–5
2022–23	Europa Conference League	First qualifying round	(North Macedonia) Akademija Pandev	4–1	2–1	6–2
2022–23	Europa Conference League	Second qualifying round	(Austria) Rapid Wien	1–2	0–0	1–2

== Ownership ==
During the communist era of the club's history, it was owned and run by employment sectors. When the club was first created it was used for the workers of the Port Reconstruction Office (Polish: Biuro Odbudowy Portów), and thus owned by the Port Reconstruction Office itself, later becoming a club for construction workers (Polish: Budowlani). Both Biuro Odbudowy Portów and Budowlani being included in the club's official name when they were run by these sectors.

In 2007 Tadeusz Dąbrowski unsuccessfully tried to invest in the club. In 2009 Andrzej Kuchar became the majority shareholder for the club, a position he held until late 2013 when he sold his shares.

In 2014 it became known that 72% of the club shares are controlled by an investment company named Wroclawskie Centrum finansowo (WCF) with the club being owned by Franz-Josef Wernze. WCF is owned by Swiss investor W&C Vermögensverwaltungs AG in which Philipp Wernze, the son of the German businessman and Lechia owner Franz-Josef Wernze, is involved. In summer 2014 this German control over Lechia became more and more obvious when several players from Germany joined the club. Under Wernze's wings are also the German clubs Viktoria Köln and Lok Leipzig. In 2017 the shares of the company's main shareholder, Lechia Investment, were taken over from W&C Vermögensverwaltungs by Advancesport AG. This saw Franz-Josef Wernze staying as the owner of Lechia, but with his son Philipp Wernze, the main shareholder in Advancesport AG, having a greater role within the club and within his father's company, ETL Group.

During the summer of 2022 there were rumours of the club looking to be sold by current owners Franz-Josef Wernze and Advancesport AG (owned by Franz's son Philippe Wernze and Adam Mandziara). The sale was due to Franz's poor health and the financial position of the club. Nothing came to a sale during 2022 and Franz-Josef Wernze died on 27 April 2023. On 6 July 2023 Adam Mandziara confirmed that Lechia were in the final stages of being bought by Emirate investment fund company MADA Global Fund For Income Opportunities (or simply MADA Global), with the investment fund having created a new company called Football Culture Poland (FCP) for the purpose of taking control of Lechia.

== Players ==
=== Current squad ===
As of 10 September 2026

Note: Flags indicate national team as defined under FIFA eligibility rules; some limited exceptions apply. Players may hold more than one non-FIFA nationality.

No.	Pos.	Nation	Player
1	GK	POL	Axel Holewiński
3	DF	UKR	Danylo Malov
4	DF	POL	Kacper Łopata
6	MF	BUL	Hristo Ivanov
7	FW	ALB	Kevin Dodaj (on loan from CSKA Sofia)
8	MF	POL	Jakub Adkonis
9	FW	POL	Michał Głogowski
10	MF	BIH	Rifet Kapić (captain)
13	MF	UKR	Artur Shakh (on loan from Karpaty Lviv)
17	MF	POL	Igor Bambecki
18	MF	SWE	Karl Wendt
19	DF	SVK	Samuel Kopásek (on loan from Pardubice)
20	MF	ARM	Narek Hovhannisyan
21	DF	UKR	Danylo Beskorovaynyi
22	GK	POL	Szymon Weirauch
23	DF	POL	Antoni Ziółkowski
27	FW	POL	Martin Szczerbiński

No.	Pos.	Nation	Player
30	MF	COL	Javier Mena
31	FW	POL	Szymon Danielewski
33	DF	POL	Tomasz Wójtowicz
37	MF	POL	Bartosz Górski
40	DF	POL	Wojciech Madej
47	DF	POL	Miłosz Zaborowski
59	MF	POL	Oskar Żakowiecki
72	GK	POL	Wojciech Buła
74	DF	POL	Maksymilian Ziółkowski
76	DF	KOS	Indrit Mavraj
77	FW	POL	Dorian Sinkiewicz
84	FW	POL	Jakub Krawcewicz
88	MF	POL	Bartosz Szczepankiewicz
90	FW	SEN	Bakary Sonko
92	DF	POL	Kacper Rogoz
97	FW	ROU	Vladislav Blănuță
99	MF	POL	Tomasz Neugebauer

=== Out on loan ===
Note: Flags indicate national team as defined under FIFA eligibility rules; some limited exceptions apply. Players may hold more than one non-FIFA nationality.

No.	Pos.	Nation	Player
11	MF	COL	Camilo Mena (at Korona Kielce until 30 June 2027)
16	GK	POL	Kacper Gutowski (at Grom Nowy Staw until 30 June 2027)

No.	Pos.	Nation	Player
—	FW	UKR	Bohdan Vyunnyk (at Legia Warsaw until 30 June 2027)

=== Retired numbers ===
Note: Flags indicate national team as defined under FIFA eligibility rules; some limited exceptions apply. Players may hold more than one non-FIFA nationality.

No.	Pos.	Nation	Player
24	GK	POL	Mateusz Bąk (2001–11, 2013–17 – posthumous honour)

=== Notable players ===
The players below played for their respective countries at any point during their career with the dates showing their time with Lechia.

Poland

- (Poland) Arkadiusz Bąk (1995)
- (Poland) Krzysztof Baszkiewicz† (1950–1953)
- (Poland) Jarosław Bieniuk (1995–1998), (2012–2014)
- (Poland) Ariel Borysiuk (2014–2016), (2018–2019)
- (Poland) Piotr Brożek (2012–2013)
- (Poland) Stanisław Baran† (1945)
- (Poland) Adam Buksa (2014–2016)
- (Poland) Stanisław Burzyński† (1965–1969)
- (Poland) Paweł Dawidowicz (2011–2014)
- (Poland) Tomasz Dawidowski (2009–2012)
- (Poland) Jan Erlich† (1978–1981)
- (Poland) Adam Fedoruk (1998–2001)
- (Poland) Przemysław Frankowski (2012–2014)
- (Poland) Zygmunt Gadecki† (1960–1962)
- (Poland) Jacek Grembocki (1982–1986), (1996–1997)
- (Poland) Henryk Gronowski† (1949–1967)
- (Poland) Robert Gronowski† (1949–1958)
- (Poland) Tadeusz Hogendorf† (1945)
- (Poland) Marcin Kaczmarek (2008–2010)
- (Poland) Rafał Kaczmarczyk (1989–1994)
- (Poland) Jakub Kałuziński (2020–2023)
- (Poland) Jerzy Kasalik (1975–1976)
- (Poland) Alfred Kokot† (1946–1953)
- (Poland) Roman Korynt† (1953–1967)
- (Poland) Jakub Kosecki (2011–2012)
- (Poland) Rafał Kosznik (2006–2008), (2010)
- (Poland) Juliusz Kruszankin (1996)
- (Poland) Janusz Kupcewicz† (1986–1988)
- (Poland) Marek Ługowski (1985–1994)
- (Poland) Daniel Łukasik (2014–2020)
- (Poland) Maciej Makuszewski (2014–2017)
- (Poland) Sebastian Małkowski (2008–2013)
- (Poland) Marcin Mięciel (1990–1993)
- (Poland) Sebastian Mila (2000–2001), (2015–2018)
- (Poland) Jarosław Nowicki (1985–1989)
- (Poland) Mariusz Pawlak (1988–1996), (2006–2007)
- (Poland) Sławomir Peszko (2015–2020)
- (Poland) Mirosław Pękala (1985–1988)
- (Poland) Rafał Pietrzak (2020–2023)
- (Poland) Zdzisław Puszkarz (1966–1981), (1986–1988)
- (Poland) Grzegorz Rasiak (2012–2013)
- (Poland) Grzegorz Oprządek (1963–1967)
- (Poland) Artur Sobiech (2018–2019)
- (Poland) Janusz Stawarz (1985–1990)
- (Poland) Łukasz Surma (2009–2013)
- (Poland) Grzegorz Szamotulski (1991–1993)
- (Poland) Mirosław Tłokiński (1975–1976)
- (Poland) Łukasz Trałka (2008)
- (Poland) Kacper Urbański (2019–2021)
- (Poland) Jakub Wawrzyniak (2015–2018)
- (Poland) Jakub Wilk (2012)
- (Poland) Sławomir Wojciechowski (1989–1993), (2004–2007)
- (Poland) Grzegorz Wojtkowiak (2015–2019)
- (Poland) Rafał Wolski (2016–2020)
- (Poland) Hubert Wołąkiewicz (2007–2011)
- (Poland) Paweł Wszołek (2004–2005)
- (Poland) Marek Zieńczuk (1996–1999), (2010)

Afghanistan

- (Afghanistan) Omran Haydary (2020–2023)

Armenia

- (Armenia) Levon Hayrapetyan (2011–2013)
- (Armenia) Narek Hovhannisyan (2026–)

Bosnia and Herzegovina

- (Bosnia and Herzegovina) Stojan Vranješ (2014–2015)

Bulgaria

- (Bulgaria) Hristo Ivanov (2026–)
- (Bulgaria) Simeon Slavchev (2016–2018)

Burkina Faso

- (Burkina Faso) Abdou Razack Traoré (2010–2012)

Canada

- (Canada) Steven Vitória (2016–2019)

Colombia

- (Colombia) Camilo Mena (2023–2026)

Congo DR

- (Democratic Republic of the Congo) Christopher Oualembo (2012–2014)

Croatia

- (Croatia) Antonio Čolak (2014–2015)
- (Croatia) Mario Maloča (2015–2018) (2019–2023)
- (Croatia) Mato Miloš (2017–2018)
- (Croatia) Luka Vučko (2011–2012)

Curaçao

- (Curaçao) Gino van Kessel (2017)

Ghana

- (Ghana) Joseph Aziz (1995)
- (Ghana) Emmanuel Tetteh (1995–1996)

Guinea-Bissau

- (Guinea-Bissau) Romário Baldé (2017–2019)
- (Guinea-Bissau) Rudinilson Silva (2014–2016)

Indonesia

- (Indonesia) Egy Maulana Vikri (2018–2021)
- (Indonesia) Witan Sulaeman (2021–2022)

Israel

- (Israel) Joel Abu Hanna (2022–2023)

Japan

- (Japan) Daisuke Matsui (2013)

Latvia

- (Latvia) Alvis Jaunzems (2025–2026)
- (Latvia) Oļegs Laizāns (2010)
- (Latvia) Ivans Lukjanovs (2009–2012)
- (Latvia) Kristers Tobers (2020–2023)

Lithuania

- (Lithuania) Vytautas Andriuškevičius (2010–2013)
- (Lithuania) Donatas Kazlauskas (2015–2016)

Mali

- (Mali) Bassekou Diabaté (2021–2023)

Martinique

- (Martinique) Bédi Buval (2010–2011)

New Zealand

- (New Zealand) Alex Paulsen (2025–2026)

Serbia

- (Serbia) Danijel Aleksić (2014)
- (Serbia) Miloš Krasić (2015–2018)
- (Serbia) Vanja Milinković-Savić (2016–2017)
- (Serbia) Filip Mladenović (2018–2020)

Slovakia

- (Slovakia) Tomáš Bobček (2023–2026)
- (Slovakia) Lukáš Haraslín (2015–2020)
- (Slovakia) Dušan Kuciak (2017–2024)
- (Slovakia) Jaroslav Mihalík (2019–2021)

Ukraine

- (Ukraine) Serhiy Buletsa (2024–2025)

United Arab Emirates

- (United Arab Emirates) Mohamed Awadalla (2025–2026)

United States

- (United States) Jerzy Panek (1973)

Dual nationals;
Israel & United States

- (Israel) (United States) Kenny Saief (2020–2021)

== Lechia Gdańsk II and Lechia's Academy ==
=== Lechia Gdańsk II ===
Lechia Gdańsk operates an official second team, known as Lechia Gdańsk II, which currently plays in the fifth tier in the IV liga Pomerania. In its early years the second team was only used for games in the Polish Cup, fielding teams in four cup competitions in their first 50 years as a club. For the 1995–96 season the merger between Lechia Gdańsk and Olimpia Poznań creating Olimpia-Lechia Gdańsk, saw the second team running as the continuation of the "Lechia Gdańsk" team in the III liga.

Lechia Gdańsk II officially became the second team in the Polish league system for the 2005–06 season. The purpose of the second team was to provide more playing experience for the younger players, while providing game time for players returning from injury. The second team played for 11 continuous seasons, achieving their highest result of 2nd in the III liga in the 2014–15 season. In 2016 it was announced that the second team was to be discontinued before it was reintroduced again for the start of the 2018–19 season.

=== Lechia Gdańsk Academy ===
In 2015 it was announced that all of the youth teams would once again be returning to Lechia, with Lechia taking control of coaching and player development. It was announced that there would be 11 age groups which would make up the academy starting from the Under-7's to the Under-23's. After 3 years, the Lechia Academy had 12 teams under their control, with other 200 staff seeing over the development. From the summer of 2019 the academy has been home to multiple levels of girls football teams with the formal incorporation of the Lechia Gdańsk Ladies into the Lechia Gdańsk structure.

==== Partnerships ====
Lechia have partnerships with academies in the Gdańsk and surrounding regions. The agreements provide Lechia with the best players, the teams to take part in competitions organised by Lechia, and better training for the coaches. Currently Lechia have partnerships with APK Jedynka Kartuzy, GAP Sparta Gdańsk, Unia Tczew, and AWFiS Gdańsk.

Current partnerships

Team	Agreement start
APK Jedynka Kartuzy	September 2019
GAP Sparta Gdańsk	January 2020
Unia Tczew	August 2020
AWFiS Gdańsk	September 2021

Former partnerships

Team	Agreement start	Agreement until	Notes
APLG	2010	2015	Lechia and APLG originally had an agreement in which APLG would serve as the club's academy, training youth players, and would also run a women's football team that was linked with Lechia Gdańsk. Disagreements in 2015 saw Lechia reform their own academy, set up their own women's team, and both clubs ended their partnership.
Football Pro Academy Rotmanka	2014	2021	Had a partnership with Lechia between 2014 and 2021, however it has not been publicly stated that this partnership continued after the original agreement or if there is no longer any coordination between Lechia and the Rotmanka Academy.

== Lechia Gdańsk Ladies ==
Initially Lechia Gdańsk was in close cooperation with Grupa Lotos for the AP LOTOS Gdańsk academy and ladies football team. The team was formerly known as "Akademia Piłkarska Lechia Gdańsk" due to the close association the two teams once had. The ladies team wore the Lechia kits to start with before disagreements led to Lechia and APLG starting to work more independently. Due to APLG and Lechia going in different directions Lechia's focus was less on the APLG ladies team and making a team of their own.

Lechia became closely linked with Biało-Zielone Gdańsk, which was formed in 2014. Biało-Zielone was another team closely linked with Lechia but was not officially part of the Lechia set up. In 2019 it was announced that the team would be incorporated into the Lechia Gdańsk academy structure and that their name was to become Lechia Gdańsk Ladies. The Lechia Ladies team currently plays in the III liga (Pomeranian group).

== Managers ==
The following list contains the statistics from all competitive games after 1 July 2001, when Lechia Gdańsk was re-founded in the sixth tier.

Name	Nat	From	To	G	W	D	L	%W
Michał Globisz	(Poland)	1 July 2001	25 August 2001	2	2	0	0	100%
Tadeusz Małolepszy	(Poland)	26 August 2001	16 November 2002	38	30	4	4	78.9%
Jerzy Jastrzębowski	(Poland)	1 February 2003	21 May 2004	53	45	3	5	84.9%
Marcin Kaczmarek	(Poland)	22 May 2004	16 June 2006	74	38	17	19	51.3%
Tomasz Borkowski	(Poland)	17 June 2006	27 August 2007	41	16	12	13	39%
Dariusz Kubicki	(Poland)	30 August 2007	22 July 2008	32	22	4	6	68.7%
Jacek Zieliński	(Poland)	23 July 2008	5 April 2009	37	9	7	21	24.3%
Tomasz Kafarski	(Poland)	7 April 2009	8 November 2011	94	32	27	35	34%
Rafał Ulatowski	(Poland)	9 November 2011	14 December 2011	4	1	0	3	25%
Paweł Janas	(Poland)	1 January 2012	24 May 2012	13	3	5	5	23%
Bogusław Kaczmarek	(Poland)	6 June 2012	4 June 2013	32	11	8	13	34.3%
Michał Probierz	(Poland)	4 June 2013	26 March 2014	42	12	15	15	28.5%
Ricardo Moniz	(Netherlands)	27 March 2014	4 June 2014	10	5	3	2	50%
Quim Machado	(Portugal)	16 June 2014	21 September 2014	9	3	3	3	33.3%
Tomasz Unton	(Poland)	21 September 2014	17 November 2014	7	1	2	4	14.2%
Jerzy Brzęczek	(Poland)	17 November 2014	1 September 2015	30	11	9	10	36.6%
Thomas von Heesen	(Germany)	1 September 2015	3 December 2015	12	3	2	7	25%
Dawid Banaczek	(Poland)	3 December 2015	13 January 2016	3	2	0	1	66.6%
Piotr Nowak	(Poland)	13 January 2016	27 September 2017	66	31	16	19	46.9%
Adam Owen	(Wales)	27 September 2017	3 March 2018	16	4	6	6	25%
Piotr Stokowiec	(Poland)	5 March 2018	28 August 2021	139	64	35	40	46.6%
Tomasz Kaczmarek	(Poland)	1 September 2021	1 September 2022	40	18	7	15	45%
Maciej Kalkowski	(Poland)	1 September 2022	19 September 2022	3	0	2	1	0%
Marcin Kaczmarek	(Poland)	19 September 2022	21 March 2023	18	7	2	9	38.8%
David Badía	(Spain)	21 March 2023	14 June 2023	9	1	2	6	11.1%
Szymon Grabowski	(Poland)	14 June 2023	23 November 2024	52	23	10	19	44.2%
Radosław Bella; Kevin Blackwell	(Poland) (England)	25 November 2024	30 November 2024	1	0	0	1	0%
John Carver	(England)	30 November 2024	23 May 2026	54	22	9	23	40.7%
Vladyslav Lupashko	(Ukraine)	1 July 2026	Present	0	0	0	0	—

Stats correct as of 23 May 2026. The managers in italics were given the contract on a caretaker basis.

=== Managerial statistics ===
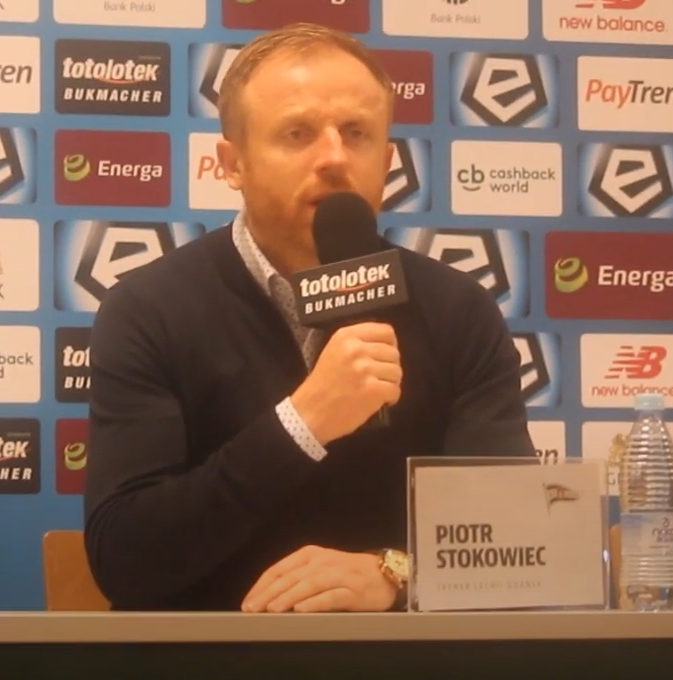
Piotr Stokowiec (2018–2021) has managed the most games for Lechia in the Ekstraklasa with 121.

Stats correct as of 31 December 2021.

- Most games as manager: Jerzy Jastrzębowski – (156 games)
- Most wins as manager: Jerzy Jastrzębowski – 103
- Most draws as manager: Bogusław Kaczmarek – 44
- Most defeats as manager: Stanisław Stachura – 66
- Highest win percentage in managers Lechia career (minimum 10 games): Tadeusz Małolepszy - 78.9% (30 wins in 38 games)
- Lowest win percentage in managers Lechia career (minimum 10 games): Edward Wojewódzki - 7.7% (1 wins in 13 games)
- Managers who have managed at least 100 games for Lechia: Jerzy Jastrzębowski (156), Bogusław Kaczmarek (148), Piotr Stokowiec (139), Stanisław Stachura (127)

== Lechia Lwów (1903–1939) ==
Lechia Gdańsk shares a lot of its history with Lechia Lwów, most notably the club's name as well as the colours used. Lechia Lwów was the oldest football team in Poland with many of the fans of the team moving to Gdańsk after Poland's borders were changed after World War II, Lwów being given to Ukrainian Soviet Socialist Republic, and the expulsion of Poles from Ukraine. Due to Lechia Lwów and Lechia Gdańsk sharing many of the same fans, Lechia Gdańsk is often seen as Lechia Lwów's "sister team". Lechia Lwów often played in the Polish second division, playing once in the top tier in the 1931 season suffering relegation that same season. The Lechia Gdańsk 2012–13 kit had "1903" written on their socks in commemoration of Lechia Lwów's 110 year anniversary since their founding.

In 2019 the Retro Liga was formed in Poland of teams who had been disbanded in 1939 due to the outbreak of World War II. The league followed the same rules and kit standards of those in 1919 when the Polish Football Association was formed. Lechia Lwów were crowned the inaugural winners of the Retro Liga at the end of the 2019 season, also defending their title for the 2020 season.

== See also ==
- Football in Poland
- List of football teams
- Champions' Cup/League
- UEFA Cup
