= List of Lechia Gdańsk records and statistics =

Records and statistics for Lechia Gdańsk.

== Records and statistics ==
=== All-time ===
- First Ever Game:
  - (Friendly) 2 September 1945, Milicyjnym Klubem Sportowym z Wrzeszcza, 4-6
  - (Competitive) 9 September 1945, Wojskowy Klub Sportowy, 9-1
- First Ever Win: 9 September 1945, Wojskowy Klub Sportowy, 9-1
- Biggest Win: 15–0 vs LKS Waplewo, 11 May 2001
- Biggest Defeat: 8–0 vs Polonia Bytom, 13 November 1949
- Highest Scoring Game: - 15 goals
  - 11–4 vs SKS Płomień Gdańsk, 9 December 1945
  - 15–0 vs LKS Waplewo, 11 May 2002
- Most Goals by a player in a Game: 7 goals – Stanisław Baran vs Wojskowy Klub Sportowy, 20 September 1945
- Fasted Goal Scored in a Game: 16 seconds – Paweł Buzała vs Wisła Kraków, 23 May 2009
- Most Total Goals in a Season: Bartłomiej Stolc, 2001–02 season – 40 goals
- Most League Goals in a Season: Bartłomiej Stolc, 2002–03 season – 34 goals
- Most League Goals in a Season: (top three divisions) Jerzy Kruszczyński, 1983–84 season – 31 goals
- Most League Goals for Lechia Gdańsk: Flávio Paixão – 83 goals (Note: Any goals scored in a league competition (promotion/relegation playoffs are not included))
- Most Goals in all Competitions for Lechia Gdańsk: Roman Rogocz – 109 goals (Note: Any goals in a league, cup, or playoff game are counted)
- Most League Apps for Lechia Gdańsk: Roman Korynt – 327 apps (Note: Appearances made in the Ekstraklasa, I liga, II liga, and III liga count as league apps.)
- Most Apps in all competitions for Lechia Gdańsk: Roman Korynt - 341 apps (Note: Any appearances in a league, cup, or playoff game are counted)
- Youngest player to feature for the first team: Kacper Urbański (achieved 21 December 2019) - 15 years, 3 months and 4 days vs Raków Częstochowa
- Oldest player to feature for the first team: Flávio Paixão (achieved 20 May 2023) - 38 years, 8 months and 1 day vs Legia Warsaw
- Youngest Goal-scorer for the first team: Sławomir Wojciechowski (achieved 16 September 1989) - 16 years, 0 months and 10 days vs Polonia Bytom
- Oldest Goal-scorer for the first team: Flávio Paixão (achieved 10 March 2023) - 38 years, 5 months and 19 days vs Miedź Legnica
- Highest percentage of goals per game: Marian Łącz - 250% (10 games, 25 goals)
- Highest percentage of goals per game, having scored more than 10 goals: Marian Łącz - 250% (10 games, 25 goals)
- Highest percentage of goals per game, having played more than 10 games: Bartłomiej Stolc - 106.5% (76 games, 81 goals)
- Highest Transfer Fee Paid: Daniel Łukasik, 2014 - 2,750,000zł (€800,000)
- Highest Transfer Fee Received: Vanja Milinković-Savić, 2017 - 10,500,000zł (€2.6 million)

=== Ekstraklasa ===
- Debut Match in Ekstraklasa: March 20, 1949, Cracovia 5–1 Lechia Gdańsk
- First Win in Ekstraklasa: March 27, 1949, Lechia Gdańsk 5–3 Ruch Chorzów
- Biggest Win in Ekstraklasa: 5–0 vs four teams; Cracovia – 7 September 1952, Zagłębie Sosnowiec – 28 April 1957, Arkonia Szczecin – 25 March 1962, Podbeskidzie – 13 February 2015
- Biggest Defeat in Ekstraklasa: 8–0 vs Polonia Bytom, 13 November 1949
- Most Lechia Goals in the Ekstraklasa: Flávio Paixão - 84 goals
- Most Lechia Apps in the Ekstraklasa: Flávio Paixão - 222 apps
- Youngest player to feature for the first team (Ekstraklasa): Kacper Urbański (achieved 21 December 2019) - 15 years, 3 months and 4 days vs Raków Częstochowa
- Oldest player to feature for the first team (Ekstraklasa): Flávio Paixão (achieved 20 May 2023) - 38 years, 8 months and 1 day vs Legia Warsaw
- Youngest Goal-scorer for the first team (Ekstraklasa): Kacper Łazaj (achieved 9 November 2012) - 17 years, 3 months and 16 days vs Ruch Chorzów
- Oldest Goal-scorer for the first team (Ekstraklasa): Flávio Paixão (achieved 10 March 2023) - 38 years, 5 months and 19 days vs Miedź Legnica
- Highest percentage of goals per game (Ekstraklasa): Bronisław Szlagowski - 54.5% (11 games, 6 goals)
- Highest percentage of goals per game, having scored more than 10 goals (Ekstraklasa): Tomáš Bobček - 58.6% (46 games, 27 goals)

==== Ekstraklasa goal milestones ====
The milestone goals scored by Lechia players in the Ekstraklasa.

- 1st goal: Piotr Nierychło (Cracovia 5–1 Lechia; 20 March 1949)
- 100th goal: Roman Rogocz (Lechia 2–1 Stal Sosnowiec; 2 September 1956)
- 200th goal: Czesław Nowicki (Lechia 2–2 Wisła Kraków; 18 September 1960)
- 300th goal: Mirosław Pękala (Lechia 4–4 Śląsk Wrocław; 17 August 1985)
- 400th goal: Emmanuel Tetteh (ŁKS Łódź 2–3 Lechia;5 June 1996)
- 500th goal: Abdou Razack Traore (Lechia 2–1 Lech Poznań; 22 May 2011)
- 600th goal: Maciej Makuszewski (Lechia 3–1 Piast Gliwice; 29 March 2014)
- 700th goal: Sebastian Mila (Lechia 2–0 Ruch Chorzów; 9 April 2016)
- 800th goal: Adam Chrzanowski (Lechia 2–2 Bruk-Bet Termalica Nieciecza; 27 February 2018)
- 900th goal: Flávio Paixão (Lechia 4–3 Arka Gdynia; 31 May 2020)
- 1000th goal: Flávio Paixão (Lechia 2–0 Warta Poznań; 23 April 2022)

== Stadium statistics ==
- Last Game at the MOSiR Stadium Gdańsk: May 29, 2011, Zagłębie Lubin, 1-2
- Last Win at the MOSiR Stadium Gdańsk: May 22, 2011, Lech Poznań, 2-1
- Last Lechia Goalscorer at the MOSiR Stadium Gdańsk: May 29, 2011, Abdou Razack Traoré
- First Game at the Stadion Energa Gdańsk: August 14, 2011, Cracovia, 1-1
- First Win at the Stadion Energa Gdańsk: September 12, 2011, Górnik Zabrze, 2-1
- First Lechia Goalscorer at the Stadion Energa Gdańsk: August 14, 2011, Fred Benson
- Highest all time Attendance: September 29, 1983, Juventus, UEFA Cup Winners Cup - 40,000 (estimate)
- Highest Ekstraklasa attendance at the Stadion Energa Gdańsk: March 19, 2017, Legia Warsaw - 37,220
- Lowest Ekstraklasa attendance at the Stadion Energa Gdańsk: February 27, 2018, Nieciecza - 2,235

=== League attendances ===
Season	Highest	Opposition	Date	Lowest	Opposition	Date		Average		Dif.
2011–12	34444	Cracovia	14 August 2011	10525	Podbeskidzie	24 March 2012		17372		
2012–13	19415	Śląsk Wrocław	21 October 2012	8000	Korona Kielce	11 March 2013		13219	Substituted off	4153
2013–14	24276	Górnik Zabrze	30 August 2013	7705	Piast Gliwice	29 March 2014		12844	Substituted off	375
2014–15	36500	Legia Warsaw	11 April 2015	7619	Piast Gliwice	7 December 2014		16608	Substituted on	3764
2015–16	22415	Legia Warsaw	11 May 2016	8827	Śląsk Wrocław	6 December 2015		11569	Substituted off	5039
2016–17	37220	Legia Warsaw	19 March 2017	10009	BBT Nieciecza	29 April 2017		17531	Substituted on	5962
2017–18	22871	Arka Gdynia	7 April 2018	2235	BBT Nieciecza	27 February 2018		10640	Substituted off	6891
2018–19	25066	Arka Gdynia	27 October 2018	8769	Wisła Płock	11 March 2019		14746	Substituted on	4106
2019–20 (Note: It was announced on 10 March that the games against Arka Gdynia and Cracovia would be played behind closed doors and the games in the championship round against Piast Gliwice, Cracovia and Legia Warsaw will be played with crowd restrictions due to the coronavirus pandemic. However these games did not go ahead as all league games were postponed indefinitely on 14 March. The attendance stats for this season includes the home games where fans were not allowed to attend.)	14008	Lech Poznań	14 September 2019	0 (Note: Due to restrictions imposed by the Polish government in reaction to the coronavirus outbreak there were no fans in attendance for the home games against Arka Gdynia and Cracovia.)	Arka Gdynia & Cracovia	31 March 2020 & 9 June 2020	-	8110	Substituted off	6636
2020–21 (Note: The games at the start of the season were with restricted capacity, with all games from October 2020 being held behind closed doors, meaning only the first three home games of the season had fans in attendance.)	5424	Raków Częstochowa	29 August 2020	0	12 games	All games from October 2020	–	987	Substituted off	7123
2021–22	23574	Legia Warsaw	3 October 2021	4677	BBT Nieciecza	19 March 2022		8787	Substituted on	7800

†Season in progress.

- All of the released attendance figures for Lechia Gdańsk before the 2011–12 Ekstraklasa season were rounded to the nearest 500.
- The impact of the coronavirus outbreak should be noted for the 2019–20 and 2020–21 seasons and its impact on attendance figures. The final two games of the regular season had to be played behind closed doors, in games which would usually draw a large attendance (the Tricity derby game against Arka Gdynia was the highest home attendance the two seasons prior). The final three games of the season, each in the championship round, had crowd restrictions due to the easing of lock-down. This has massively impacted the average attendance figures. While in the 2020–21 season fans were only able to attend 3 of the 15 home league games.

== Goalscorers ==
=== Top goalscorers by season ===
	League		Cup (Note: The "Cup" games top scorer are counted as any goals in other competitions other than the league. These include; Polish Cup, Polish SuperCup, League Cups (Young Leaders Rally Cup, League Cup, Polish League Cup & Ekstraklasa Cup), UEFA Cup Winners' Cup, UEFA Europa League, and when Lechia were in the lower divisions and could not take part in the Polish Cup the regional cup competitions stats are listed.)		Total	
Season	Player	Goals	Player	Goals	Player	Goals
1945-46	Marian Łącz	13	-		Marian Łącz	13
1946-47	Tadeusz Skowroński	13	-		Tadeusz Skowroński	13
1947-48	Roman Rogocz	15	-		Roman Rogocz	15
1949	Roman Rogocz	7	-		Roman Rogocz	7
1950	Robert Gronowski	10	-		Robert Gronowski	10
1951	Roman Rogocz	19	Leszek Goździk, Krzysztof Baszkiewicz	1	Roman Rogocz	19
1952	Robert Gronowski	5	Alfred Kokot, Aleksander Kupcewicz	3 (Note: the goals counted were for the Polish Cup and the Young Leaders Rally Cup. Kokot scored once in the Polish Cup and twice in the Young Leaders Rally Cup. Kupcewicz scored all three in the Young Leaders Rally Cup)	Robert Gronowski	7
1953	Robert Gronowski	5	-		Robert Gronowski	5
1954	Roman Rogocz	6	-		Roman Rogocz	6
1955	Czesław Nowicki, Leszek Goździk, Alfred Kobylański	3	Alfred Kobylański	4	Alfred Kobylański	7
1956	Roman Rogocz	7	Czesław Nowicki; Jerzy Czubała	1	Roman Rogocz	7
1957	Robert Gronowski, Bronisław Szlagowski	6	Józef Górny, Władysław Musiał	1	Robert Gronowski, Bronisław Szlagowski	6
1958	Bogdan Adamczyk	11	-		Bogdan Adamczyk	11
1959	Bogdan Adamczyk	7	-		Bogdan Adamczyk	7
1960	Czesław Nowicki	13	-		Czesław Nowicki	13
1961	Czesław Nowicki	6	-		Czesław Nowicki	6
1962-63	Bogdan Adamczyk	7	-		Bogdan Adamczyk	7
1963-64	Bogdan Adamczyk	12	Bogdan Adamczyk, Janusz Charczuk	1	Bogdan Adamczyk	13
1964-65	Jerzy Apolewicz	7	-		Jerzy Apolewicz	7
1965-66	Jerzy Apolewicz	9	Jerzy Sionek, Zdzisław Michalski	1	Jerzy Apolewicz	9
1966-67	Bogdan Adamczyk	6	Bogdan Adamczyk	2	Bogdan Adamczyk	8
1967-68	Bogdan Adamczyk	16	Janusz Mirowski	1	Bogdan Adamczyk	16
1968-69	Marek Hartman	9	-		Marek Hartman	9
1969-70	Marian Maksymiuk	7	-		Marian Maksymiuk	7
1970-71	Jerzy Panek	9	Jerzy Jastrzębowski, Zbigniew Kupcewicz	1	Jerzy Panek	9
1971-72	Jerzy Jastrzębowski	10	-		Jerzy Jastrzębowski	10
1972-73	Janusz Orczykowski	6	-		Janusz Orczykowski	6
1973-74	Tomasz Korynt	6	Andrzej Głownia	2	Andrzej Głownia	7
1974-75	Tomasz Korynt, Leonard Radowski, Zdzisław Puszkarz	8	-		Tomasz Korynt, Leonard Radowski, Zdzisław Puszkarz	8
1975-76	Tomasz Korynt	8	Leonard Radowski	1	Tomasz Korynt	8
1976-77	Tomasz Korynt	9	-		Tomasz Korynt	9
1977-78	Krzysztof Matuszewski	15	-		Krzysztof Matuszewski	15
1978-79	Zbigniew Kruszyński	9	Henryk Kliszewicz, Krzysztof Matuszewski	3	Zbigniew Kruszyński	10
1979-80	Zdzisław Puszkarz, Jarosław Studzizba	5	-		Zdzisław Puszkarz, Jarosław Studzizba	5
1980-81	Andrzej Salach	7	Jarosław Studzizba, Dariusz Raczyński	2	Andrzej Salach	7
1981-82	Andrzej Salach, Ryszard Polak, Zdzisław Puszkarz, Dariusz Raczyński, Jan Kierno	2	-		Andrzej Salach, Ryszard Polak, Zdzisław Puszkarz, Dariusz Raczyński, Jan Kierno	2
1982-83	Marek Kowalczyk	10	Bolesław Błaszczyk, Marek Kowalczyk	3	Marek Kowalczyk	13
1983-84	Jerzy Kruszczyński	31	Jerzy Kruszczyński	2 (Note: the goals counted were for the UEFA Cup Winners' Cup and the Polish SuperCup. Lechia were not part of that seasons Polish Cup. Jerzy Kruszczyński scored 1 goal in each of the Polish SuperCup & UEFA Cup Winners Cup)	Jerzy Kruszczyński	33
1984-85	Jerzy Kruszczyński	8	Jerzy Kruszczyński, Maciej Kamiński, Andrzej Marchel	1	Jerzy Kruszczyński	9
1985-86	Mirosław Pękala, Maciej Kamiński	5	-		Mirosław Pękala, Maciej Kamiński	5
1986-87	Mirosław Pękala, Janusz Kupcewicz	6	-		Mirosław Pękala, Janusz Kupcewicz	6
1987-88	Ryszard Przygodzki	4	Janusz Kupcewicz	1	Ryszard Przygodzki	4
1988-89	Piotr Prabucki, Jarosław Nowicki	5	Jarosław Nowicki	1	Jarosław Nowicki	6
1989-90	Jacek Chociej, Marek Ługowski	6	Mirosław Giruć	1	Jacek Chociej, Marek Ługowski	6
1990-91	Grzegorz Pawłuszek	10	Grzegorz Pawłuszek	1	Grzegorz Pawłuszek	11
1991-92	Tomasz Unton	6	-		Tomasz Unton	6
1992-93	Sławomir Wojciechowski	9	Rafał Kaczmarczyk	5	Sławomir Wojciechowski, Rafał Kaczmarczyk	10
1993-94	Marcin Kaczmarek	9	Krystian Gergella, Rafał Kaczmarczyk, Sargis Khachatryan	1	Marcin Kaczmarek	9
1994-95	Grzegorz Król	6	Sławomir Matuk	1	Grzegorz Król	6
1995-96	Emmanuel Tetteh	9	Grzegorz Król	1	Emmanuel Tetteh	9
1996-97	Jacek Grembocki	12	Grzegorz Król	1	Jacek Grembocki	12
1997-98	Tomasz Dawidowski	13	Marcin Kubsik	1	Tomasz Dawidowski	13
1998-99	Adam Fedoruk	7	Adam Fedoruk, Robert Kugiel	2	Adam Fedoruk	9
1999-2000	Robert Kugiel	10	-		Robert Kugiel	10
2000-01	Tomasz Moskal, Dariusz Preis	6	Krzysztof Rusinek	2	Dariusz Preis	7
2001-02	Bartłomiej Stolc	29	Bartłomiej Stolc	11	Bartłomiej Stolc	40
2002-03	Bartłomiej Stolc	34	Marek Szutowicz	4	Bartłomiej Stolc	36
2003-04	Marek Szutowicz	14	Jakub Bławat, Marek Wasicki	3	Marek Szutowicz	15
2004-05	Krzysztof Rusinek	10	Marek Wasicki	2	Krzysztof Rusinek	10
2005-06	Krzysztof Brede	6	-		Krzysztof Brede	6
2006-07	Piotr Cetnarowicz	13	Grzegorz Król	1	Piotr Cetnarowicz	13
2007-08	Maciej Rogalski	11	Paweł Buzała	6	Maciej Rogalski	16
2008-09	Paweł Buzała	5	Maciej Kalkowski	2 (Note: the goals counted were for the Polish Cup and the Ekstraklasa Cup. Maciej Kalkowski scored one goal each in the Polish Cup and the Ekstraklasa Cup)	Paweł Buzała	5
2009-10	Hubert Wołąkiewicz	4	Paweł Buzała	3	Hubert Wołąkiewicz, Paweł Buzała	5
2010-11	Abdou Traoré	12	Abdou Traoré, Ivans Lukjanovs, Bédi Buval	1	Abdou Traoré	13
2011-12	Abdou Traoré	4	-		Abdou Traoré	4
2012–13	Abdou Traoré	9	Abdou Traoré, Piotr Wiśniewski, Sebastian Madera	1	Abdou Traoré	10
2013–14	Patryk Tuszynski, Piotr Grzelczak, Stojan Vranjes	7	Patryk Tuszynski, Piotr Wiśniewski, Przemysław Frankowski, Paweł Buzała	1	Patryk Tuszynski	8
2014–15	Antonio Čolak	10	Piotr Grzelczak	1	Antonio Čolak	10
2015–16	Grzegorz Kuświk	11	Bartłomiej Pawłowski, Piotr Wiśniewski	2	Grzegorz Kuświk	11
2016–17	Marco Paixão	18	Flávio Paixão	1	Marco Paixão	18
2017–18	Marco Paixão	16	-		Marco Paixão	16
2018–19	Flávio Paixão	15	Artur Sobiech	3	Flávio Paixão	15
2019–20	Flávio Paixão	14	Flávio Paixão	7 (Note: the goals counted were for the Polish Cup, Polish SuperCup and the UEFA Europa League. Flávio Paixão scored 5 goals in the Polish Cup and 2 in the Europa League)	Flávio Paixão	21
2020–21	Flávio Paixão	12	Łukasz Zwoliński	2	Flávio Paixão	12
2021–22	Łukasz Zwoliński	14	Łukasz Zwoliński	2	Łukasz Zwoliński	16
2022–23	Łukasz Zwoliński	9	Łukasz Zwoliński	4 (Note: the goals counted were for the Polish Cup and the UEFA Europa Conference League. Łukasz Zwoliński scored 2 in the Europa Conference League and 2 in the Puchar Polski.)	Łukasz Zwoliński	13
2023–24	Maksym Khlan (Note: the goal Khlan scored against Wisła Płock was originally given as an own goal, which most sources of media have kept as the original decision. The Polish Football Association however reversed this decision and classified the goal as Khlan's. Some media still cites he scored 9 goals, others that he scored 10. This is notable as Tomáš Bobček also scored 9 goals for Lechia, but this additional goal makes him the outright clubs top goal-scorer for the season.)	10	Luis Fernández	1	Maksym Khlan	10
2024–25	Tomáš Bobček	8	Louis D'Arrigo	1	Tomáš Bobček	8
2025–26	Tomáš Bobček	20	Aleksandar Ćirković	2	Tomáš Bobček	21

- The Polish Cup has always been held in two calendar years (e.g. September to May) where as in Lechia's history the league was held in one calendar year from 1949 to 1962. For the 1950–62 seasons when Lechia played in the cup, the goals will count towards the season of the final, example: the 1956-57 Polish Cup goals will be added to the 1957 league season.
- The Cup goals includes goals from the Polish Cup, Polish SuperCup, and any goals scored in European competitions.
- The Polish Cup was not held from 1926 to 1950, 1953, and from 1958 to 1961.

== Player statistics ==
=== All time player statistics ===
(Stats correct as of 21 November 2025)

All-time most Lechia appearances and goals.

Apps
No.	Name	Apps
1	Roman Korynt	344
2	Zdzisław Puszkarz	343
3	Andrzej Salach	337
4	Czesław Nowicki	289
5	Henryk Gronowski	281
6	Marek Ługowski	273
7	Flávio Paixão	266
8	Jerzy Apolewicz	265
9	Piotr Wiśniewski	260
10	Mateusz Bąk	245
11	Andrzej Marchel	236
12	Czesław Lenc	233
13	Józef Gładysz	232
14	Tomasz Borkowski	230
15	Mariusz Pawlak	228
16	Andrzej Głownia	218
17	Tomasz Unton	218
18	Bogdan Adamczyk	216
19	Zbigniew Żemojtel	215
20	Maciej Kozak	213
21	Lech Kulwicki	213
22	Władysław Musiał	212
23	Aleksander Cybulski	211
24	Dušan Kuciak	209
25	Janusz Makowski	208
26	Jerzy Górski	204
27	Sławomir Matuk	204
28	Marcin Pietrowski	189
29	Edmund Wierzyński	189
30	Robert Gronowski	188
31	Henryk Wieczorkowski	186
32	Rafał Janicki	185
33	Marcin Kubsik	185
34	Hubert Kusz	182
35	Maciej Kamiński	181
36	Marian Maksymiuk	178
37	Maciej Kalkowski	176
38	Michał Nalepa	176
39	Jarosław Kubicki	175
40	Mario Maloča	174
41	Roman Rogocz	169
42	Paweł Buzała	162
43	Janusz Charczuk	162
44	Jerzy Kaleta	160
45	Mirosław Giruć	157
46	Tomasz Piętka	157
47	Jacek Grembocki	152
48	Janusz Stawarz	152
49	Sławomir Wojciechowski	150
50	Jacek Chociej	146

Goals
No.	Name	Goals
1	Roman Rogocz	109
2	Flávio Paixão	95
3	Bartłomiej Stolc	81
4	Bogdan Adamczyk	78
5	Zdzisław Puszkarz	61
6	Jerzy Apolewicz	59
7	Robert Gronowski	59
8	Leszek Goździk	52
9	Marek Wasicki	52
10	Piotr Wiśniewski	48
11	Alfred Kokot	46
12	Jerzy Kruszczyński	45
13	Aleksander Kupcewicz	45
14	Łukasz Zwoliński	44
15	Paweł Buzała	42
16	Czesław Nowicki	41
17	Marek Szutowicz	38
18	Tomasz Korynt	36
19	Tomasz Unton	36
20	Marco Paixão	34
21	Krzysztof Matuszewski	33
22	Marian Maksymiuk	30
23	Władysław Musiał	30
24	Andrzej Głownia	28
25	Leonard Radowski	28
26	Stanisław Baran	27
27	Tomáš Bobček	27
28	Abdou Razack Traore	27
29	Krzysztof Wilk	27
30	Sławomir Wojciechowski	27
31	Piotr Cetnarowicz	26
32	Jerzy Jastrzębowski	26
33	Marian Łącz	26
34	Marcin Kaczmarek	25
35	Janusz Melaniuk	25
36	Janusz Charczuk	24
37	Marek Hartman	24
38	Maciej Kalkowski	24
39	Przemysław Urbański	24
40	Jacek Grembocki	23
41	Maciej Kamiński	23
42	Henryk Kokot	22
43	Ryszard Polak	22
44	Jerzy Sionek	21
45	Jakub Wiszniewski	21
46	Marek Kowalczyk	20
47	Łukasz Paulewicz	20
48	Maciej Rogalski	20
49	Andrzej Salach	20
50	Tadeusz Skowroński	20
51	Edmund Wierzyński	20
52	Marek Zieńczuk	20

=== Ekstraklasa player statistics ===
The players listed have either; a minimum of 100 league appearances or 10 league goals for Lechia in the Ekstraklasa.

(Stats correct as of 21 November 2025)

Apps
No.	Name	Apps
1	Flávio Paixão	239
2	Roman Korynt	207
3	Dušan Kuciak	196
4	Czesław Nowicki	189
5	Czesław Lenc	182
6	Rafał Janicki	176
7	Piotr Wiśniewski	172
8	Henryk Gronowski	166
9	Mario Maloča	160
10	Władysław Musiał	158
11	Michał Nalepa	152
12	Jarosław Kubicki	151
13	Marcin Pietrowski	140
14	Hubert Kusz	137
15	Daniel Łukasik	128
16	Łukasz Surma	125
17	Henryk Wieczorkowski	125
18	Robert Gronowski	122
19	Jerzy Kaleta	122
20	Bogdan Adamczyk	120
21	Maciej Gajos	118
22	Ryszard Szyndlar	114
23	Maciej Kamiński	109
24	Kacper Sezonienko	109
25	Conrado	108
26	Lukáš Haraslín	108
27	Krzysztof Bąk	106
28	Roman Rogocz	104
29	Aleksander Cybulski	101
30	Sławomir Peszko	100
31	Rafał Pietrzak	100

Goals
No.	Name	Goals
1	Flávio Paixão	84
2	Bogdan Adamczyk	36
3	Łukasz Zwoliński	36
4	Robert Gronowski	35
5	Marco Paixão	34
6	Czesław Nowicki	30
7	Roman Rogocz	29
8	Piotr Wiśniewski	28
9	Tomáš Bobček	26
10	Abdou Razack Traore	25
11	Władysław Musiał	21
12	Grzegorz Kuświk	19
13	Janusz Charczuk	18
14	Paweł Buzała	17
15	Stojan Vranjes	16
16	Mirosław Pękala	14
17	Maciej Gajos	13
18	Artur Sobiech	13
19	Leszek Goździk	12
20	Lukáš Haraslín	12
21	Michał Nalepa	12
22	Maciej Makuszewski	12
23	Sławomir Peszko	12
24	Zygmunt Gadecki	11
25	Piotr Grzelczak	11
26	Maciej Kamiński	11
27	Ivan Zhelizko	11
28	Antonio Čolak	10

=== League player statistics ===
The players listed are in the top 25 for appearances or goals in the league (the league stats counted include all league competitions from the Ekstraklasa (first tier) down to the A Klasa (sixth tier)).

(Stats correct as of 10 February 2025)

Apps
No.	Name	Apps
1	Roman Korynt	327
2	Zdzisław Puszkarz	326
3	Andrzej Salach	303
4	Czesław Nowicki	265
5	Marek Ługowski	258
6	Jerzy Apolewicz	249
7	Henryk Gronowski	246
8	Piotr Wiśniewski	240
9	Tomasz Borkowski	239
10	Flávio Paixão	234
11	Józef Gładysz	221
12	Mateusz Bąk	220
13	Mariusz Pawlak	218
14	Andrzej Marchel	216
15	Tomasz Unton	210
16	Czesław Lenc	208
17	Andrzej Głownia	205
18	Władysław Musiał	204
19	Maciej Kozak	203
20	Bogdan Adamczyk	202
21	Zbigniew Żemojtel	202
22	Dušan Kuciak	196
23	Marcin Kubsik	195
24	Aleksander Cybulski	194
25	Janusz Makowski	194
26	Sławomir Matuk	194

Goals
No.	Name	Goals
1	Flávio Paixão	84
2	Roman Rogocz	77
3	Bogdan Adamczyk	73
4	Bartłomiej Stolc	68
5	Jerzy Apolewicz	57
6	Robert Gronowski	55
7	Zdzisław Puszkarz	55
8	Piotr Wiśniewski	43
9	Jerzy Kruszczyński	42
10	Czesław Nowicki	37
11	Marek Wasicki	37
12	Tomasz Unton	36
13	Łukasz Zwoliński	36
14	Marco Paixão	34
15	Tomasz Korynt	33
16	Marek Szutowicz	33
17	Paweł Buzała	32
18	Aleksander Kupcewicz	30
19	Marian Maksymiuk	29
20	Krzysztof Matuszewski	29
21	Władysław Musiał	29
22	Alfred Kokot	27
23	Leszek Goździk	26
24	Sławomir Wojciechowski	26
25	Piotr Cetnarowicz	25

=== Polish Cup player statistics ===
The players listed have either; a minimum of 15 cup appearances or 5 cup goals for Lechia in the Polish Cup.

(Stats correct as of 8 November 2023)

Apps
No.	Name	Apps
1	Andrzej Salach	22
2	Marcin Pietrowski	21
3	Flávio Paixão	20
4	Jarosław Kubicki	18
4	Michał Nalepa	18
4	Piotr Wiśniewski	18
7	Lech Kulwicki	17
8	Paweł Buzała	16
9	Henryk Gronowski	15

Goals
No.	Name	Goals
1	Paweł Buzała	10
2	Rafał Kaczmarczyk	6
2	Flávio Paixão	6
2	Łukasz Zwoliński	6
4	Zdzisław Puszkarz	5
4	Leonard Radowski	5
4	Piotr Wiśniewski	5
4	Leszek Goździk	5

=== Polish Cup finals ===
The players listed have scored for Lechia in a Polish Cup final.

(Stats correct as of 31 July 2020)

No.	Name	Goals
1	Krzysztof Górski	1
1	Marek Kowalczyk	1
1	Artur Sobiech	1
1	Omran Haydary	1
1	Patryk Lipski	1

=== Polish SuperCup ===
The players listed have scored for Lechia in a Polish SuperCup final.

(Stats correct as of 30 July 2020)

No.	Name	Goals
1	Lukáš Haraslín	2
2	Jarosław Kubicki	1
2	Jerzy Kruszczyński	1

=== European competitions ===
The players listed have scored for Lechia in any European competition (UEFA Cup Winners' Cup 1983, Europa League 2019, Europa Conference League 2022).

(Stats correct as of 1 August 2022)

No.	Name	Goals
1	Flávio Paixão	5
2	Łukasz Zwoliński	2
3	Maciej Gajos	1
3	Marek Kowalczyk	1
3	Jerzy Kruszczyński	1
3	Patryk Lipski	1
3	Rafał Pietrzak	1

=== Polish League Cup player statistics ===
The League Cup in Poland has been played over various different competitions. The League Cups Lechia took part in were the Young Leaders Rally Cup (1952), Polish League Cup (2000–01), and the Ekstraklasa Cup (2008–2009). Due to there being no League Cup in Poland for the foreseeable future, those that made 10 or more appearances are included as well as those who scored more than one goal for Lechia in a League Cup competition.

(Stats correct as of 31 August 2020)

Apps
No.	Name	Apps
1	Henryk Gronowski	11
1	Alfred Kamzela	11
1	Henryk Kokot	11
4	Robert Gronowski	10
4	Alfred Kokot	10
4	Czesław Lenc	10
4	Tadeusz Miksa	10

Goals
No.	Name	Apps
1	Aleksander Kupcewicz	3
2	Alfred Kokot	2
2	Robert Gronowski	2
2	Czesław Nowicki	2
2	Czesław Lenc	2

== Cards ==
All-time most yellow and red cards.

Yellow and red cards were introduced in the 1971–72 season. Before this season players would be excluded from further play in the game, as a result of no cards being used before this season, any players excluded from further play in the game are not included.

(Stats correct as of 8 November 2023)

Yellows
No.	Name	Yellows
1	Piotr Wiśniewski	56
2	Michał Nalepa	52
3	Rafał Janicki	42
4	Maciej Kalkowski	38
5	Jarosław Kubicki	38
6	Mariusz Pawlak	37
7	Tomasz Borkowski	33
8	Aleksander Cybulski	31
8	Mario Maloča	31
10	Marcin Kubsik	28
10	Filip Mladenović	28

Reds
No.	Name	Reds
1	Mariusz Pawlak	6
2	Michał Nalepa	5
3	Paweł Pęczak	4
4	Grzegorz Miłkowski	3
4	Sławomir Peszko	3
6	16 players	2

== Hat-tricks ==
=== Ekstraklasa hat-tricks ===
Hat-trick's scored by Lechia players in the Ekstraklasa.

No.	Player	Against	Result	Date	Ref
1	Bronisław Szlagowski	Zagłębie Sosnowiec	5–0 (H)	28 April 1957	
2	Bogdan Adamczyk	Legia Warsaw	3–1 (H)	26 October 1958	
3	Bogdan Adamczyk	Arkonia Szczecin	5–0 (H)	25 March 1962	
4	Bogdan Adamczyk	Arkonia Szczecin	3–0 (H)	12 September 1962	
5	Patryk Tuszyński	Zawisza Bydgoszcz	0–3 (A)	24 February 2014	
6	Piotr Wiśniewski	Piast Gliwice	3–1 (H)	7 December 2014	
7	Flávio Paixão	Jagiellonia Białystok	5–1 (H)	6 March 2016	
8	Marco Paixão	Jagiellonia Białystok	4–0 (H)	17 May 2017	
9	Marco Paixão	Pogoń Szczecin	4–0 (H)	28 May 2017	
10	Flávio Paixão	Arka Gdynia	4–2 (H)	7 April 2018	
11	Artur Sobiech	Zagłębie Lubin	3–3 (H)	22 September 2018	
12	Flávio Paixão	Arka Gdynia	4–3 (H)	31 May 2020	
13	Łukasz Zwoliński	Stal Mielec	3–2 (H)	8 May 2022	-
14	Tomáš Bobček	Lech Poznań	3–4 (H)	26 July 2025	-

=== Hat-tricks scored for Lechia ===
Hat-tricks scored by Lechia players in any competitive competition.

No.	Player	Goals	Against	Result	Date	Competition	Tier
1	Marian Łącz	4	WKS 16 Dyw. Gdańsk	9–1 (H)	9 September 1945	A Klasa qualifying	-
2	Marian Łącz (2)	3	KS Milicyjny Gdańsk	3–5 (A)	16 September 1945	A Klasa qualifying	-
3	Stanisław Baran	6	Gedania Gdańsk	7–2 (H)	23 September 1945	A Klasa qualifying	-
4	Stanisław Baran (2)	7	WKS 16 Dyw. Gdańsk	0–13 (A)	30 September 1945	A Klasa qualifying	-
5	Kazimierz Januszewski	3	WKS 16 Dyw. Gdańsk	0–13 (A)	30 September 1945	A Klasa qualifying	-
6	Stanisław Baran (3)	3	Milicyjny Gdańsk	6–1 (H)	7 October 1945	A Klasa qualifying	-
7	Marian Łącz (3)	3	Unia Tczew	2–4 (A)	28 October 1945	A Klasa	II
8	Stanisław Baran (4)	5	Wisła Tczew	8–1 (H)	18 November 1945	A Klasa	II
9	Marian Łącz (4)	3	Wisła Tczew	8–1 (H)	18 November 1945	A Klasa	II
10	Marian Łącz (5)	3	Milicyjny Gdańsk	2–3 (A)	2 December 1945	A Klasa	II
11	Stanisław Baran (5)	4	Płomień Gdańsk	11–4 (H)	9 December 1945	A Klasa	II
12	Marian Łącz (6)	4	Płomień Gdańsk	11–4 (H)	9 December 1945	A Klasa	II
13	Aleksander Kupcewicz	3	Wisła Tczew	1–10 (A)	13 October 1946	A Klasa Championship	II
14	Tadeusz Skowronski	3	Wisła Tczew	1–10 (A)	13 October 1946	A Klasa Championship	II
15	Alfred Pochopień	3	Unia Tczew	9–1 (H)	20 October 1946	A Klasa Championship	II
16	Aleksander Kupcewicz (2)	4	Bałtyk Gdańsk	0–12 (A)	10 November 1946	A Klasa Championship	II
17	Tadeusz Skowronski (2)	3	Bałtyk Gdańsk	0–12 (A)	10 November 1946	A Klasa Championship	II
18	Aleksander Kupcewicz (3)	3	Płomień Gdańsk	10–0 (H)	1 December 1946	A Klasa Championship	II
19	Alfred Kokot	3	Płomień Gdańsk	10–0 (H)	1 December 1946	A Klasa Championship	II
20	Roman Rogocz	3	Gwardia Olsztyn	2–7 (A)	27 June 1946	I liga promotion playoffs	-
21	Roman Rogocz (2)	6	Unia Tczew	3–11 (A)	6 May 1948	A Klasa Championship	II
22	Roman Rogocz (3)	3	Gryf Wejherowo	4–7 (A)	16 May 1948	A Klasa Championship	II
23	Aleksander Kupcewicz (4)	4	Pocztowy KS Gdańsk	9–1 (H)	27 May 1948	A Klasa Championship	II
24	Roman Rogocz (4)	3	Lublinianka Lublin	3–0 (H)	11 July 1948	I liga promotion playoffs	-
25	Roman Rogocz (5)	5	Gwardia Olsztyn	7–2 (H)	25 July 1948	I liga promotion playoffs	-
26	Leszek Goździk	3	PTC Pabianice	2–5 (A)	22 August 1948	I liga promotion playoffs	-
27	Aleksander Kupcewicz (5)	3	PTC Pabianice	7–2 (H)	3 October 1948	I liga promotion playoffs	-
28	Roman Rogocz (6)	3	Pafawag Wrocław	4–2 (H)	15 April 1951	II liga	II
29	Roman Rogocz (7)	3	Pomorzanin Toruń	2–3 (A)	6 May 1951	II liga	II
30	Roman Rogocz (8)	6	Pomorzanin Toruń	14–0 (H)	15 August 1951	II liga	II
31	Krzysztof Baszkiewicz	3	Pomorzanin Toruń	14–0 (H)	15 August 1951	II liga	II
32	Robert Gronowski	3	Pomorzanin Toruń	14–0 (H)	15 August 1951	II liga	II
33	Leszek Goździk	3	Gwardia Warszawa	4–2 (H)	14 October 1951	I liga promotion playoffs	-
34	Bronisław Szlagowski	3	Zagłębie Sosnowiec	5–0 (H)	28 April 1957	I liga	I
35	Bogdan Adamczyk	3	Legia Warsaw	3–1 (H)	26 October 1958	I liga	I
36	Bogdan Adamczyk (2)	3	Arkonia Szczecin	5–0 (H)	25 March 1962	I liga	I
37	Bogdan Adamczyk (3)	3	Arkonia Szczecin	3–0 (H)	12 September 1962	I liga	I
38	Bogdan Adamczyk (4)	3	Rakow Częstochowa	3–1 (H)	7 June 1964	II liga	II
39	Bogdan Adamczyk (5)	3	Victoria Sianów	0–4 (A)	27 August 1967	III liga	III
40	Marek Hartman	3	Pomorzanin Toruń	7–0 (H)	20 October 1968	III liga	III
41	Marek Hartman (2)	3	Gryf Toruń	5–0 (H)	27 October 1968	III liga	III
42	Janusz Orczykowski	3	Gwardia Koszalin	8–0 (H)	12 October 1969	III liga	III
43	Jerzy Panek	3	Stoczniowiec Gdańsk	3–2 (H)	18 April 1971	III liga	III
44	Tadeusz Jahn	3	Gwardia Koszalin	3–0 (H)	12 August 1973	II liga	II
45	Andrzej Szczęsny	3	Neptun Pruszcz Gdański	1–5 (A)	22 May 1974	Polish Cup	-
46	Leonard Radowski	3	Warfama Dobre Miasto	2–10 (A)	11 August 1974	Polish Cup	-
47	Tomasz Korynt	3	Zagłębie Wałbrzych	3–1 (H)	17 October 1976	II liga	II
48	Krzysztof Matuszewski	3	Arkonia Szczecin	4–1 (H)	11 June 1978	II liga	II
49	Jerzy Kruszczyński	4	Stal Stocznia Szczecin	5–1 (H)	8 October 1983	II liga	II
50	Jerzy Kruszczyński (2)	3	Arka Gdynia	3–0 (H)	30 October 1983	II liga	II
51	Jerzy Kruszczyński (3)	3	Arka Gdynia	1–4 (A)	20 June 1984	II liga	II
52	Marcin Kaczmarek	3	Chemik Bydgoszcz	3–6 (A)	26 August 1992	Polish Cup	-
53	Rafał Kaczmarczyk	3	Chemik Bydgoszcz	3–6 (A)	26 August 1992	Polish Cup	-
54	Jacek Grembocki	3	Chrobry Głogów	3–4 (H)	14 September 1996	II liga	II
55	Tomasz Dawidowski	4	Stolem Gniewino	1–5 (A)	28 March 1998	III liga	III
56	Dariusz Skrzypczak	4	Olimpia Grudziądz	12–0 (H)	9 May 1998	III liga	III
57	Tomasz Dawidowski (2)	3	Olimpia Grudziądz	12–0 (H)	9 May 1998	III liga	III
58	Jaroslaw Sapiński	3	Brda Bydgoszcz	3–0 (H)	30 May 1998	III liga	III
59	Łukasz Paulewicz	3	Błyskawica Postolin	3–0 (H)	25 August 2001	A Klasa	VI
60	Bartłomiej Stolc	4	Mewa Gniew	13–1 (H)	15 September 2001	A Klasa	VI
61	Krzysztof Wilk	3	Mewa Gniew	13–1 (H)	15 September 2001	A Klasa	VI
62	Marek Wasicki	3	Zieloni Łąg	0–7 (A)	11 October 2001	Regional Polish Cup	-
63	Przemysław Urbański	3	Piast Majewo	7–0 (H)	14 October 2001	A Klasa	VI
64	Bartłomiej Stolc (2)	6	Nadmrzanin Stegna	13–0 (H)	27 October 2001	A Klasa	VI
65	Marcin Waniuga	3	Cartusia Kartuzy II	1–8 (A)	3 November 2001	Regional Polish Cup	-
66	Bartłomiej Stolc (3)	3	Wisła Korzeniewo	5–0 (H)	20 April 2002	A Klasa	VI
67	Bartłomiej Stolc (4)	4	Mewa Gniew	1–9 (A)	4 May 2002	A Klasa	VI
68	Marek Wasicki (2)	4	LKS Waplewo	15–0 (H)	14 May 2002	A Klasa	VI
69	Przemysław Urbański (2)	3	LKS Waplewo	15–0 (H)	14 May 2002	A Klasa	VI
70	Marek Wasicki (3)	3	Huragan Nowe Polaszki	0–3 (A)	22 September 2002	District League	V
71	Marek Wasicki (4)	3	Kolejarz Chojnice	1–7 (A)	5 October 2002	District League	V
72	Bartłomiej Stolc (5)	3	Wietcisa Skarszewy	5–0 (H)	12 October 2002	District League	V
73	Marek Wasicki (5)	3	Błękitni Stare Pole	4–1 (H)	26 October 2002	District League	V
74	Marek Szutowicz	4	Powiśle Stary Targ	0–6 (A)	22 March 2003	District League	V
75	Marek Szutowicz (2)	4	Kolejarz Chojnice	6–1 (H)	10 May 2003	District League	V
76	Bartłomiej Stolc (6)	3	Żuławy Nowy Dwór Gd.	7–0 (H)	14 May 2003	District League	V
77	Bartłomiej Stolc (7)	3	Grom Kleszczewo	8–1 (H)	24 May 2003	District League	V
78	Marek Szutowicz (3)	3	Grom Kleszczewo	8–1 (H)	24 May 2003	District League	V
79	Bartłomiej Stolc (8)	3	Błękitni Stare Pole	0–6 (A)	31 May 2003	District League	V
80	Marek Szutowicz (4)	4	Powiśle Dzierzgoń	0–7 (A)	13 September 2003	IV Liga	IV
81	Jakub Bławat	3	LKP Jareks Grabowo	2–8 (A)	21 April 2004	Regional Polish Cup	-
82	Jakub Bławat (2)	4	Sparta Sycewice	0–5 (A)	25 April 2004	IV Liga	IV
83	Marek Wasicki (6)	4	Pomezania Malbork	6–0 (H)	23 June 2004	IV Liga	IV
84	Paweł Buzała	3	Jarota Jarocin	1–4 (A)	29 August 2007	Polish Cup	-
85	Patryk Tuszyński	3	Zawisza Bydgoszcz	0–3 (A)	24 February 2014	Ekstraklasa	I
86	Piotr Wiśniewski	3	Piast Gliwice	3–1 (H)	7 December 2014	Ekstraklasa	I
87	Flávio Paixão	3	Jagiellonia Białystok	5–1 (H)	6 March 2016	Ekstraklasa	I
88	Marco Paixão	3	Jagiellonia Białystok	4–0 (H)	17 May 2017	Ekstraklasa	I
89	Marco Paixão (2)	3	Pogoń Szczecin	4–0 (H)	28 May 2017	Ekstraklasa	I
90	Flávio Paixão (2)	3	Arka Gdynia	4–2 (H)	7 April 2018	Ekstraklasa	I
91	Artur Sobiech	3	Zagłębie Lubin	3–3 (H)	22 September 2018	Ekstraklasa	I
92	Flávio Paixão (3)	3	Arka Gdynia	4–3 (H)	31 May 2020	Ekstraklasa	I
93	Łukasz Zwoliński	3	Stal Mielec	3–2 (H)	8 May 2022	Ekstraklasa	I
94	Flávio Paixão (4)	3	Akademija Pandev	4–1 (H)	7 July 2022	Europa Conference League	-
95	Luis Fernández	3	Chrobry Głogów	2–4 (A)	22 July 2023	I liga	II
96	Tomáš Bobček	3	Lech Poznań	3–4 (H)	26 July 2025	Ekstraklasa	I
97	Artur Shakh	3	Stal Mielec	7–1 (H)	19 September 2026	I liga	I

== Age statistics ==
=== Goal scorers ===
Players are only listed once, this will either be at the date of their first goal for the youngest goal scorers, or for their last goal with the oldest goal scorers.

Youngest
No.	Name	Date	Opposition	Age
1	Sławomir Wojciechowski	16 September 1989	Polonia Bytom	16 years, 0 months, 10 days

Oldest
No.	Name	Date	Opposition	Age
1	Flávio Paixão	10 March 2023	Miedź Legnica	38 years, 5 months, 20 days
2	Zdzisław Puszkarz	28 June 1987	Lech Poznań	38 years, 0 months, 24 days
3	Roman Korynt	7 November 1965	Raków Częstochowa	36 years, 0 months, 27 days
4	Mariusz Pawlak	13 May 2007	Miedź Legnica	35 years, 3 months, 25 days
5	Łukasz Surma	27 August 2012	Pogoń Szczecin	35 years, 2 months, 0 days
6	Jerzy Apolewicz	4 June 1972	Czarni Szczecin	35 years, 1 month, 13 days
7	Zygmunt Czyżewski	30 September 1945	WKS 16 Dyw. Gdańsk	34 years, 11 months, 27 days
8	Piotr Cetnarowicz	30 April 2008	Podbeskidzie	34 years, 10 months, 12 days
9	Andrzej Golecki	17 June 2000	Raków Częstochowa	34 years, 9 months, 30 days
10	Piotr Wiśniewski	28 May 2017	Pogoń Szczecin	34 years, 9 months, 18 days

== Transfers ==
The top 10 record arrivals and departures for Lechia.

Arrivals
No.	Name	Nat.	From	Date	Price
1	Daniel; Łukasik	POL	Legia Warsaw	1 July 2014	€800k
2	Bartłomiej; Pawłowski	POL	Widzew Łódź	1 July 2014	€600k
3	Tomáš; Bobček	SVK	MFK Ružomberok	4 September 2023	€600k
4	Ariel; Borysiuk	POL	1. FC Kaiserslautern	1 July 2015	€500k
5	Rafał; Wolski	POL	ACF Fiorentina	4 July 2016	€500k
6	Ivan; Zhelizko	UKR	Valmiera FC	1 August 2023	€500k
7	Camilo; Mena	COL	Valmiera FC	4 August 2023	€500k
8	Sebastian; Mila	POL	Śląsk Wrocław	22 January 2015	€370k
9	Łukasz; Zwoliński	POL	HNK Gorica	10 February 2020	€350k
10	Maciej; Makuszewski	POL	Terek Grozny	1 July 2014	€300k

Departures
No.	Name	Nat.	To	Date	Price
1	Vanja; Milinković-Savić	SER	Torino	1 July 2017	€2.6m
2	Paweł; Dawidowicz	POL	Benfica	1 July 2014	€2.5m
3	Lukáš; Haraslín	SVK	Sassuolo	1 September 2020	€1.7m
4	Karol; Fila	POL	Strasbourg	1 July 2021	€1.5m
5	Konrad; Michalak	POL	Akhmat Grozny	1 July 2019	€1.5m
6	Ariel; Borysiuk	POL	Legia Warsaw	11 January 2016	€800k
7	Kacper; Urbański	POL	Bologna	1 July 2021	€750k
8	Mateusz; Żukowski	POL	Rangers	31 January 2022	€595k
9	Wojciech; Pawłowski	POL	Udinese	1 July 2012	€500k
10	Paweł; Stolarski	POL	Legia Warsaw	14 August 2018	€500k

== Awards ==
The awards shown are those handed out by the league (Ekstraklasa and I Liga), and only includes awards given to Lechia players since the club's promotion to the top division back in 2008. In the case of top goal scorers however, it lists every player who is known to have scored the most in the competition for that season.

=== Seasonal ===
League Top Goalscorer;

- 1983–84 (II liga) – Jerzy Kruszczyński (31 goals)
- 2001–02 (Class A (Gdańsk IV)) – Bartłomiej Stolc (29 goals)
- 2016–17 (Ekstraklasa) – Marco Paixão (18 goals)
- 2025–26 (Ekstraklasa) – Tomáš Bobček (20 goals)

Polish Cup Top Goalscorer;

- 2007–08 – Paweł Buzała (6 goals)
- 2019–20 – Flávio Paixão (5 goals)

League Top Assister;

- 2018–19 – Filip Mladenovic (9 assists)

Ekstraklasa Goalkeeper of the Season;

- 2019–20 – Dušan Kuciak

Team of the season
(Players who featured in the leagues official team of the season)

- 2023–24 I liga – Bohdan Sarnavskyi (GK), Elias Olsson (CB), Ivan Zhelizko (DM), Maksym Khlan (LM), Camilo Mena (RM)

Ekstraklasa Number of the Season
(An award that recognises the most significant milestone achieved that season)

- 2021–22 – Flávio Paixão (100); Flávio became the first foreigner to score 100 goals in the Ekstraklasa.

Turbokozak winner
(Turbokozak is a TV programme where players compete in footballing skill games to achieve the highest score)

- 2017–18 – Sebastian Mila (245pts)
- 2021–22 – Łukasz Zwoliński (310pts)

=== Monthly ===
Player of the month;

- October 2012 – Abdou Razack Traoré
- November 2018 – Flávio Paixão
- February 2019 – Filip Mladenović
- June 2020 – Łukasz Zwoliński
- February 2024 – Maksym Khlan (I liga)
- November 2025 – Tomáš Bobček

Young Player of the Month;

- September 2024 – Szymon Weirauch
- May 2025 – Kacper Sezonienko

Manager of the month;

- September 2021 – Tomasz Kaczmarek

Number of the Month (An award that recognises the most significant milestone, record, or statistic achieved that month)

- October 2021 – Dušan Kuciak (277); Kuciak became the foreign player to amass the most Ekstraklasa appearances with 277.
- April 2022 – Flávio Paixão (100); Flávio became the first foreign player to score 100 goals in the Ekstraklasa.
- August 2022 – Dušan Kuciak (300); Kuciak became the first foreign player to reach 300 Ekstraklasa appearances.
- November 2025 – Tomáš Bobček (4); Bobček made two goal contributions (goal or assist) in four consecutive Ekstraklasa matches.

=== Fans Player of the Season ===
(The players who was voted as player of the season by fans)

Season	League	Player	Position	Nationality	Notes
2023–24	I liga	Rifet Kapić	Midfielder	Ukraine	Decided via a Facebook vote.

== Internationals ==
=== Internationals (while at Lechia) ===
Players who have represented their national team while playing for Lechia.

Nation	Player	Matches	Goals	Year(s)
POL	Roman Korynt	32	0	1953–1959
ARM	Levon Hayrapetyan	19	0	2011–2012
LVA	Kristers Tobers	18	1	2020–2023
POL	Sławomir Peszko	14	0	2015–2018
IDN	Witan Sulaeman	14	6	2021–2022
LVA	Ivans Lukjanovs	10	0	2010–2012
SVK	Lukáš Haraslín	8	1	2019
LTU	Vytautas Andriuškevičius	7	0	2011–2012
AFG	Omran Haydary	7	0	2021–2022
BFA	Abdou Razack Traoré	7	1	2011–2012
CAN	Steven Vitória	7	1	2016–2017
BUL	Simeon Slavchev	6	0	2016–2018
POL	Jakub Wawrzyniak	6	0	2015–2016
IDN	Egy Maulana Vikri	5	1	2021
CUW	Gino van Kessel	4	0	2017
SVK	Dušan Kuciak	4	0	2020–2021
POL	Sebastian Mila	4	0	2015
SER	Filip Mladenović	4	0	2019
GNB	Rudinilson	3	0	2014–2016
POL	Łukasz Trałka	3	0	2008–2009
POL	Rafał Wolski	3	1	2017
POL	Hubert Wołąkiewicz	3	0	2010
SVK	**Tomáš Bobček**	2	1	2025
POL	Ariel Borysiuk	2	0	2015
POL	Marek Ługowski	2	0	1987
SVK	Jaroslav Mihalík	2	0	2020
NZL	**Alex Paulsen**	2	0	2025
UAE	**Mohamed Awadalla**	1	0	2025
POL	Henryk Gronowski	1	0	1957
POL	Robert Gronowski	1	0	1953
LVA	**Alvis Jaunzems**	1	0	2025
POL	Alfred Kokot	1	1	1949
POL	Sebastian Małkowski	1	0	2011
POL	Mirosław Pękala	1	0	1987
POL	Rafał Pietrzak	1	0	2020
POL	Zdzisław Puszkarz	1	0	1975

Players in bold are still at the club

(Correct as of 21 November 2025)

=== International goals ===
International goals by players playing for Lechia

Nation	Player	Date	Venue	Opposition	Score	Result	Competition
Poland	Alfred Kokot	19 June 1949	Polish Army Stadium, Warsaw, Poland	Denmark	**1**–0	1–2	Friendly
Burkina Faso	Abdou Razack Traoré	4 June 2011	Independence Stadium, Windhoek, Namibia	Namibia	0–**1**	4–1	2012 Africa Cup of Nations qualification
Canada	Steven Vitória	6 October 2016	Stade de Marrakech, Marrakesh, Morocco	Mauritania	**2**–0	4–0	Friendly
Poland	Rafał Wolski	5 October 2017	Republican Stadium, Yerevan, Armenia	Armenia	1–**6**	1–6	2018 FIFA World Cup qualification
Slovakia	Lukáš Haraslín	7 June 2019	Anton Malatinský Stadium, Trnava, Slovakia	Jordan	**1**–1	5–1	Friendly
Indonesia	Egy Maulana Vikri	25 May 2021	Jebel Ali Centre of Excellence, Dubai, United Arab Emirates	Afghanistan	**1**–3	2–3	Friendly
Indonesia	Witan Sulaeman	11 October 2021	Buriram Stadium, Buriram, Thailand	Chinese Taipei	0–**3**	0–3	2023 Asian Cup qualification
Indonesia	Witan Sulaeman	25 November 2021	Emirhan Sports Complex, Antalya, Turkey	Myanmar	**3**–0	4–1	Friendly
Indonesia	Witan Sulaeman	12 December 2021	Bishan Stadium, Bishan, Singapore	Laos	1–**3**	1–5	2020 AFF Championship
Indonesia	Witan Sulaeman	22 December 2021	National Stadium, Kallang, Singapore	Singapore	0–**1**	1–1	2020 AFF Championship
Indonesia	Witan Sulaeman	14 June 2022	Jaber Al-Ahmad International Stadium, Kuwait City, Kuwait	Nepal	**2**–0	7–0	2023 AFC Asian Cup qualification
Indonesia	Witan Sulaeman	14 June 2022	Jaber Al-Ahmad International Stadium, Kuwait City, Kuwait	Nepal	**6**–0	7–0	2023 AFC Asian Cup qualification
Latvia	Kristers Tobers	16 June 2023	Skonto Stadium, Riga, Latvia	Turkey	**2**–2	2–3	UEFA Euro 2024 qualifying
Slovakia	Tomáš Bobček	14 November 2025	Košická futbalová aréna, Košice, Slovakia	Northern Ireland	**1**–0	1–0	2026 FIFA World Cup qualification

=== Internationals (during career) ===
The following players have played for their national team but not necessarily during their time with Lechia

(Dates in brackets is the time they spent playing for Lechia)

The players below played for their respective countries at any point during their career with the dates showing their time with Lechia.

Poland

- (Poland) Arkadiusz Bąk (1995)
- (Poland) Krzysztof Baszkiewicz (1950–1953)
- (Poland) Jarosław Bieniuk (1995–1998), (2012–2014)
- (Poland) Ariel Borysiuk (2014–2016), (2018–2019)
- (Poland) Piotr Brożek (2012–2013)
- (Poland) Stanisław Baran (1945)
- (Poland) Adam Buksa (2014–2016)
- (Poland) Stanisław Burzyński (1965–1969)
- (Poland) Paweł Dawidowicz (2011–2014)
- (Poland) Tomasz Dawidowski (2009–2012)
- (Poland) Jan Erlich (1978–1981)
- (Poland) Adam Fedoruk (1998–2001)
- (Poland) Przemysław Frankowski (2012–2014)
- (Poland) Zygmunt Gadecki (1960–1962)
- (Poland) Jacek Grembocki (1982–1986), (1996–1997)
- (Poland) Henryk Gronowski (1949–1967)
- (Poland) Robert Gronowski (1949–1958)
- (Poland) Tadeusz Hogendorf (1945)
- (Poland) Marcin Kaczmarek (2008–2010)
- (Poland) Rafał Kaczmarczyk (1989–1994)
- (Poland) Jakub Kałuziński (2020–2023)
- (Poland) Jerzy Kasalik (1975–1976)
- (Poland) Alfred Kokot (1946–1953)
- (Poland) Roman Korynt (1953–1967)
- (Poland) Jakub Kosecki (2011–2012)
- (Poland) Rafał Kosznik (2006–2008), (2010)
- (Poland) Juliusz Kruszankin (1996)
- (Poland) Janusz Kupcewicz (1986–1988)
- (Poland) Marek Ługowski (1985–1994)
- (Poland) Daniel Łukasik (2014–2020)
- (Poland) Maciej Makuszewski (2014–2017)
- (Poland) Sebastian Małkowski (2008–2013)
- (Poland) Marcin Mięciel (1990–1993)
- (Poland) Sebastian Mila (2000–2001), (2015–2018)
- (Poland) Jarosław Nowicki (1985–1989)
- (Poland) Mariusz Pawlak (1988–1996), (2006–2007)
- (Poland) Sławomir Peszko (2015–2020)
- (Poland) Mirosław Pękala (1985–1988)
- (Poland) Rafał Pietrzak (2020–2023)
- (Poland) Zdzisław Puszkarz (1966–1981), (1986–1988)
- (Poland) Grzegorz Rasiak (2012–2013)
- (Poland) Artur Sobiech (2018–2019)
- (Poland) Janusz Stawarz (1985–1990)
- (Poland) Łukasz Surma (2009–2013)
- (Poland) Grzegorz Szamotulski (1991–1993)
- (Poland) Mirosław Tłokiński (1975–1976)
- (Poland) Łukasz Trałka (2008)
- (Poland) Kacper Urbański (2019–2021)
- (Poland) Jakub Wawrzyniak (2015–2018)
- (Poland) Jakub Wilk (2012)
- (Poland) Sławomir Wojciechowski (1989–1993), (2004–2007)
- (Poland) Grzegorz Wojtkowiak (2015–2019)
- (Poland) Rafał Wolski (2016–2020)
- (Poland) Hubert Wołąkiewicz (2007–2011)
- (Poland) Paweł Wszołek (2004–2005)
- (Poland) Marek Zieńczuk (1996–1999), (2010)

Afghanistan

- (Afghanistan) Omran Haydary (2020–2023)

Armenia

- (Armenia) Levon Hayrapetyan (2011–2013)

Bosnia and Herzegovina

- (Bosnia and Herzegovina) Stojan Vranješ (2014–2015)

Bulgaria

- (Bulgaria) Simeon Slavchev (2016–2018)

Burkina Faso

- (Burkina Faso) Abdou Razack Traoré (2010–2012)

Canada

- (Canada) Steven Vitória (2016–2019)

Congo DR

- (Democratic Republic of the Congo) Christopher Oualembo (2012–2014)

Croatia

- (Croatia) Antonio Čolak (2014–2015)
- (Croatia) Mario Maloča (2015–2018) (2019–2023)
- (Croatia) Mato Miloš (2017–2018)
- (Croatia) Luka Vučko (2011–2012)

Curaçao

- (Curaçao) Gino van Kessel (2017)

Ghana

- (Ghana) Joseph Aziz (1995)
- (Ghana) Emmanuel Tetteh (1995–1996)

Guinea-Bissau

- (Guinea-Bissau) Romário Baldé (2017–2019)
- (Guinea-Bissau) Rudinilson Silva (2014–2016)

Haiti

- (Haiti) Joenal Castma (1999–2000)

Indonesia

- (Indonesia) Egy Maulana Vikri (2018–2021)
- (Indonesia) Witan Sulaeman (2021–2022)

Israel

- (Israel) Joel Abu Hanna (2022–2023)

Japan

- (Japan) Daisuke Matsui (2013)

Latvia

- (Latvia) Alvis Jaunzems (2025–)
- (Latvia) Oļegs Laizāns (2010)
- (Latvia) Ivans Lukjanovs (2009–2012)
- (Latvia) Kristers Tobers (2020–2023)

Lithuania

- (Lithuania) Vytautas Andriuškevičius (2010–2013)
- (Lithuania) Donatas Kazlauskas (2015–2016)

Mali

- (Mali) Bassekou Diabaté (2021–2023)

Martinique

- (Martinique) Bédi Buval (2010–2011)

New Zealand

- (New Zealand) Alex Paulsen (2025–)

Serbia

- (Serbia) Danijel Aleksić (2014)
- (Serbia) Miloš Krasić (2015–2018)
- (Serbia) Vanja Milinković-Savić (2016–2017)
- (Serbia) Filip Mladenović (2018–2020)

Slovakia

- (Slovakia) Tomáš Bobček (2025–)
- (Slovakia) Lukáš Haraslín (2015–2020)
- (Slovakia) Dušan Kuciak (2017–2024)
- (Slovakia) Jaroslav Mihalík (2019–2021)

Sweden

- (Sweden) Henrik Castegren (2022–2023)

United Arab Emirates

- (United Arab Emirates) Mohamed Awadalla (2025–)

Ukraine

- (Ukraine) Serhiy Buletsa (2024–2025)

United States

- (United States) Jerzy Panek (1973)

Dual nationals;
Israel & United States

- (Israel) (United States) Kenny Saief (2020–2021)

=== Tournament players ===
World Cup players

The following players have been selected by their country for the World Cup Finals, while playing for Lechia.

FIFA World Cup
Nat.	Player	Year	Games	Goals
(Poland)	Sławomir Peszko	2018	1	0

European Championship players

The following players have been selected by their country for the UEFA European Championship Finals, while playing for Lechia.

UEFA European Championships
Nat.	Player	Year	Games	Goals
(Poland)	Sławomir Peszko	2016	3	0
(Poland)	Jakub Wawrzyniak	2016	Squad only	
(Slovakia)	Dušan Kuciak	2021	Squad only	

Africa Cup of Nations Players

The following players have been selected by their country for the Africa Cup of Nations Finals, while playing for Lechia.

Africa Cup of Nations
Nat.	Player	Year	Games	Goals
(Burkina Faso)	Abdou Razack Traoré	2012	Squad only	

CONCACAF Gold Cup Players

The following players have been selected by their country for the CONCACAF Gold Cup Finals, while playing for Lechia.

CONCACAF Gold Cup
Nat.	Player	Year	Games	Goals
(Canada)	Steven Vitória	2017	4	0

UEFA Nations League players

The following players have been selected by their country for the UEFA Nations League, while playing for Lechia.

UEFA Nations League
Nat.	Player	Year	Games	Goals	Notes
(Slovakia)	Dušan Kuciak	2020–21	1	0	League B (Group 2)
(Slovakia)	Jaroslav Mihalík	2020–21	1	0	League B (Group 2)
(Latvia)	Kristers Tobers	2020–21	2	0	League D (Group 1)
(Latvia)	Kristers Tobers	2022–23	5	0	League D (Group 1)

AFF Championship players

The following players have been selected by their country for the AFF Championship, while playing for Lechia.

AFF Championship
Nat.	Player	Year	Games	Goals
(Indonesia)	Witan Sulaeman	2021	8	2

== Internationals (youth teams) ==
World Cup players

The following players have been selected by their country for the U-20 World Cup Finals, while playing for Lechia.

FIFA U-20 World Cup
Nat.	Player	Year	Games	Goals
(Poland)	Tomasz Makowski	2019	3	0
FIFA U-17 World Cup
Nat.	Player	Year	Games	Goals
(Poland)	Łukasz Mierzejewski	1999	3	0
(Poland)	Sebastian Mila	1999	1	0
(Poland)	Łukasz Nawotczyński	1999	3	0

Summer Olympics players

The following players have been selected by their country for the Summer Olympic Games, while playing for Lechia. In the Olympics, teams are made up of under-23's players, with a maximum of 3 players over the age of 23.

Summer Olympics
Nat.	Player	Year	Games	Goals
(Ukraine)	Maksym Khlan	2024	3	0

European Championship players

The following players have been selected by their country for the UEFA European Under-21 Championship Finals, while playing for Lechia.

Under 21's - UEFA European Championships
Nat.	Player	Year	Games	Goals
(Slovakia)	Lukáš Haraslín	2017	3	0
(Serbia)	Vanja Milinković-Savić	2017	2	0
(Poland)	Karol Fila	2019	3	0
(Poland)	Konrad Michalak	2019	3	0
Under 18's - UEFA European Championships
Nat.	Player	Year	Games	Goals
(Poland)	Zbigniew Kruszyński	1978	5	0
(Poland)	Waldemar Majcher	1979	2	1
(Poland)	Andrzej Marchel	1982	1*	0
(Poland)	Dariusz Wójtowicz	1984	5	0
(Poland)	Sławomir Wojciechowski	1992	4	1
(Poland)	Sebastian Mila	2001	4	0
Under 17's - UEFA European Championships
Nat.	Player	Year	Games	Goals
(Poland)	Damian Kugiel	2012	1	0
(Poland)	Miłosz Kurzydłowski	2022	2	0
(Poland)	Antoni Mikułko	2022	1	0
Under 16's - UEFA European Championships
Nat.	Player	Year	Games	Goals
(Poland)	Łukasz Mierzejewski	1999	1*	0
(Poland)	Sebastian Mila	1999	0*	0
(Poland)	Łukasz Nawotczyński	1999	1*	0

- Minimum number of games

Toulon Tournament players

The following players have been selected by their country for the Maurice Revello Tournament (previously known as the Toulon Tournament), while playing for Lechia.

Under 20's - Maurice Revello Tournament
Nat.	Player	Year	Games	Goals
(Ukraine)	Maksym Khlan	2024	5	2

Four Nations Tournament players

The following players have been selected by their country for the Four Nations Tournament, while playing for Lechia.

Under 20's - Four Nations Tournament
Nat.	Player	Year	Games	Goals
(Poland)	Przemysław Frankowski	2013–14	1	0
(Poland)	Adam Dźwigała	2014–15	3	1
(Poland)	Paweł Stolarski	2015–16	5	0
(Poland)	Paweł Stolarski	2016–17	4	0

Elite League players

The following players have been selected by their country for the Under 20 Elite League, while playing for Lechia.

Under 20's - Elite League
Nat.	Player	Year	Games	Goals
(Poland)	Mateusz Żukowski	2019–20	1	0
(Poland)	Jan Biegański	2021–22	4	0
(Poland)	Jakub Kałuziński	2021–22	4	0
(Poland)	Mateusz Żukowski	2021–22	2	0
(Poland)	Jan Biegański	2022–23	1	0

== Managerial records and statistics ==
Stats correct as of 14 September 2021.

- Most games as manager: Jerzy Jastrzębowski (156 games)
- Most wins as manager: Jerzy Jastrzębowski - 103
- Most draws as manager: Bogusław Kaczmarek - 44
- Most defeats as manager: Stanisław Stachura - 66
- Highest win percentage in managers Lechia career (minimum 10 games): Tadeusz Małolepszy - 78.9% (30 wins in 38 games)
- Lowest win percentage in managers Lechia career (minimum 10 games): Edward Wojewódzki - 7.7% (1 wins in 13 games)
- Managers who have managed at least 100 games for Lechia: Jerzy Jastrzębowski (156), Bogusław Kaczmarek (148), Piotr Stokowiec (139), Stanisław Stachura (127)

=== Managerial achievements ===
- Finished in the top 3 in the Ekstraklasa: Tadeusz Foryś (3rd, 1955), Piotr Stokowiec (3rd, 2019)
- Won the Polish Cup: Jerzy Jastrzębowski (1983), Piotr Stokowiec (2019)
- Won the Polish SuperCup: Jerzy Jastrzębowski (1983), Piotr Stokowiec (2019)
- Won promotion to the Ekstraklasa with Lechia: Czesław Bartolik (1951), Tadeusz Foryś (1954), Jerzy Jastrzębowski (1984), Dariusz Kubicki (2008), Szymon Grabowski (2024)
- Club statistic: Stanisław Stachura managed an independent Lechia Gdańsk as well as both of the teams created by mergers; Olimpia-Lechia Gdańsk & Lechia-Polonia Gdańsk.

== Random statistics ==
- Goal-scoring Goalkeepers: Józef Pokorski - 5 Penalties (all in 1948) vs PTC Pabianice; 5–2, Skra Częstochowa; 6–1, Gwardia Olsztyn; 7–2, Bzura Chodaków; 4–4, and Gedania Gdańsk; 5-1
  Krzysztof Słabik - 2 goals (both in 1974) Penalties vs Warta Poznań; 2–0, Olimpia Poznań; 1-0
  Ludwik Łoś - 1 goal (1946) Penalty vs Bałtyk Gdańsk; 12–0.
  Mateusz Bąk - 1 goal (2002) vs LKS Waplewo; 15-0 (scored the 15th goal in the 90th minute from a penalty)
- Most Different Leagues Played in for Lechia Mateusz Bąk (2000-2010, 2013–17) 6 different divisions - Klasa A group Gdańsk IV (sixth tier), Liga okręgowa group Gdańsk II (fifth tier), IV liga group Pomorska (fourth tier), III liga group II (third tier), II liga (second tier), Ekstraklasa (first tier).
- Most Promotions with Lechia: Mateusz Bąk (2000–10, 2013–17) 5 promotions - Sixth tier to first tier.
- Most goals in the Tricity derby: Flávio Paixão - 10 goals
- Players who have spent their whole professional playing career with Lechia: Roman Rogocz (1947–62), Marian Maksymiuk (1961–73), Czesław Nowicki (1951–66), Józef Gładysz (1970–82) & Andrzej Salach (1977–93)
  - Those who spent their whole playing career with Lechia but played for less than 10 years: Janusz Charczuk (1960–68) & Jerzy Jastrzębowski (1967–74)
- First player born in the 21st century to feature for Lechia: Mateusz Żukowski (born 23 November 2001) vs Sandecja Nowy Sącz 16 December 2017
- Family members where each member has featured in the league for the first team; (only league stats shown)
  - Hubert Nowakowski (1945–1952: 10 apps) & Ewald Nowakowski (1963–1965: 7 apps) – Father & Son
  - Alfred Kokot (1946–1953: 82 apps, 27 goals) & Henryk Kokot (1946–1952: 48 apps, 12 goals) – Brothers
  - Aleksander Kupcewicz (1946–1957: 87 apps, 30 goals), Zbigniew Kupcewicz (1971–1972: 19 apps, 4 goals) & Janusz Kupcewicz (1986–1988: 39 apps, 8 goals) – Father & Sons
  - Zygmunt Adamczyk (1949: 1 app) & Roman Adamczyk (1949–1950: 2 apps) – Brothers
  - Robert Gronowski (1949–1960: 161 apps, 58 goals), Henryk Gronowski (1949–1961, 1963–1969: 258 apps) & Jakub Gronowski (2003–2005: 28 apps, 1 goal) – Brothers (Robert & Henryk) & Grandfather & Grandson (Robert & Jakub)
  - Roman Korynt (1953–1968: 327 apps, 8 goals) & Tomasz Korynt (1972–1977: 102 apps, 33 goals) – Father & Son
  - Alfred Kobylański (1955–1957: 38 apps, 7 goals) & Martin Kobylański (2016–2017: 3 apps) – Grandfather & Grandson
  - Kazimierz Frąckiewicz (1956–1959, 1961–1964: 88 apps, 13 goals) & Janusz Frąckiewicz (1962: 1 app, 0 goals) – Twins
  - Ryszard Kaczmarek (1963, 1967: 6 apps, 0 goals) & Andrzej Kaczmarek (1969–1974: 98 apps, 5 goals) – Brothers
  - Jerzy Gorski (1969–1979: 191 apps, 2 goals) & Grzegorz Górski (1991, 1993–1995: 21 apps, 0 goals) – Father & Son
  - Wojciech Łazarek (1967–1970: 35 apps, 16 goals) & Grzegorz Łazarek (1985–1988: 48 apps, 1 goal) – Father & Son
  - Mirosław Głos (1975–1977: 18 apps) & Dariusz Głos (1993–1997: 57 apps, 8 goals) – Father & Son
  - Bogusław Kaczmarek (1975–1977: 54 apps, 7 goals) & Marcin Kaczmarek (1990–1994, 2003–2004: 93 apps, 22 goals) – Father & Son
  - Andrzej Wydrowski (1981–1985: 28 apps) & Janusz Wydrowski (1981–1984: 7 apps) – Twins
  - Janusz Duda (1984: 5 apps, 0 goals) & Adam Duda (2012–2013: 26 apps, 5 goals) – Father & Son
  - Grzegorz Motyka (1991–1996, 2000: 116 apps, 8 goals) & Tomasz Motyka (1991, 1993–1997: 37 apps) – Brothers
  - Robert Kugiel (1998–2002: 113 apps, 23 goals) & Damian Kugiel (2011–2014: 4 apps) – Father & Son
  - Michał Biskup (1999–2000: 21 apps, 0 goals) & Jakub Biskup (2004–2006: 53 apps, 7 goals) – Brothers
  - Przemysław Urbański (2001–2004: 71 apps, 21 goals) & Kacper Urbański (2019–2020: 4 apps) – Father & Son
  - Marco Paixão (2016–2018: 66 apps, 34 goals) & Flávio Paixão (2016–present: 161 apps, 62 goals) – Twins
- Family members who have managed Lechia;
  - Bogusław Kaczmarek (1989–1992, 2012–2013: 148 games) & Marcin Kaczmarek (2004–2006, 2022–present: 84 games) – Father & Son
- Nations firsts
  - First non-Polish player: Sargis Khachatryan (Armenia) - Debut: 13 May 1993
  - First Asian player: Sargis Khachatryan (Armenia) - Debut: 13 May 1993
  - First African player: Emmanuel Tetteh (Ghana) - Debut: 5 August 1995
  - First South American players: Saulo Pereira de Carvalho & Sérgio Batata (both from Brazil) - Debut: 25 July 1998
  - First North American player: Michael Butler (United States) - Debut: 16 October 1999
  - First non-Polish European player: Andrey Danaev (Ukraine) - Debut: 5 May 2001

=== Amber Cup statistics ===
The Amber Cup tournament is the largest indoor football tournament in Poland and has been held most years since 2006. Lechia competed in the tournament taking a team every year from 2011 to 2018 and won the tournament four times (2011, 2013, 2016, 2017). These are the statistics for the club at this tournament.

==== Top goalscorer ====
The top goal scorers for Lechia in each tournament they participated in.

Year	Top scorer	Goals
2011	Tomasz Dawidowski	4
2012	Piotr Wiśniewski	3
2013	Andrzej Kaszuba	4
2014	Adam Duda	2
2015	Andrzej Kaszuba	3
2016	Sławomir Peszko	5
2017	Sławomir Peszko & Lukáš Haraslín	4
2018	Patryk Lipski & Mateusz Żukowski	4

==== All-time top scorers ====
No.	Player	Goals
1	Piotr Wiśniewski	9
1	Sławomir Peszko	9
3	Andrzej Kaszuba	8
4	Lukáš Haraslín	6
5	Tomasz Dawidowski	4
5	Patryk Lipski	4
5	Mateusz Żukowski	4

== Fans’ records ==
Lechia Gdańsk fans currently hold the following record;

- Most people singing the full Polish national anthem: 7,614 - 10 November 2019, vs Pogoń Szczecin

Lechia Gdańsk fans broke the record for the most people singing all four verses of the Polish national anthem at the same time. The previous record was 3,171 people, with Lechia fans breaking the record with 7,614.
