= Marian Maksymiuk =

Polish footballer (1945–2019)

Personal information
- Full name: Marian Maksymiuk
- Date of birth: 25 March 1945
- Place of birth: Biała Podlaska, Poland
- Date of death: 11 July 2019 (aged 74)
- Place of death: Gdańsk, Poland
- Position: Midfielder

Senior career*
Years	Team	Apps	(Gls)
1961–1973	Lechia Gdańsk	168	(29)
- * Club domestic league appearances and goals

Marian Maksymiuk (25 March 1945 – 11 July 2019) was a Polish footballer who played as a midfielder.

== Biography ==
Maksymiuk was born in Biała Podlaska, in USSR occupied territory which had been annexed from the Germany army the year prior. His family moved to Gdańsk, likely as a result of the Polish population transfers after the war. Maksymiuk started playing football from an early age, showing promising talent, and representing Poland in the under 16's and under 18's teams. He made his professional debut with Lechia Gdańsk on 6 September 1961 against Stal Mielec in the I liga. He went on to make a total of 6 appearances in Poland's top division over the next two seasons, before Lechia suffered relegation to the II liga.

The next four years of his career with Lechia were spent in the second division. During this time he made 79 league appearances, scoring 7 goals, before Lechia were once again relegated at the end of the 1966–67 season. In the first three seasons of Lechia's time in the III liga, Maksymiuk made few appearances for the club, making a combined total of 20 appearances across these three seasons, but still made an impact within the club. In the 1968–69 season Maksymiuk made 12 appearances and scored 8 goals, being the clubs second highest goal scorer despite making so few appearances, while in the 1969–70 season, despite only making 6 appearances in the league that season, he finished as the clubs highest goal scorer with 7 goals for the season. Lechia spent a total of five seasons in the III liga, with Maksymiuk making 65 appearances and scoring 22 goals during this period. He was among the squad that won the 1971–72 III liga, and achieving promotion back to the II liga. He played a further full season before calling time on his playing career shortly after the start of the 1973–74 season. In total he made 175 appearances and scored 30 goals in all competitions for Lechia.

After his playing career Maksymiuk went into coaching, coaching the youth teams at Lechia, as well as other teams in the Pomeranian region as well, including at Pomezania Malbork. He died on 11 July 2019 in Gdańsk, with his funeral taking place on 17 July. He is buried in the Łostowice Cemetery.

== Honours ==
Lechia Gdańsk

- III liga (Poznań group): 1971–72
