= Jerzy Apolewicz =

Polish footballer (1938–2003)

Personal information
- Date of birth: 23 April 1938
- Place of birth: Vilnius, Poland
- Date of death: 12 May 2003 (aged 65)
- Place of death: Gdańsk, Poland
- Height: 1.63 m (5 ft 4 in)
- Positions: Midfielder; forward

Youth career
- 1950–1957: Sparta Orunia

Senior career*
Years	Team	Apps	(Gls)
1958–1973	Lechia Gdańsk	249	(57)
Total		249	(57)

International career
1955	Poland U18	1	(0)

Managerial career
- 1974-1976: Lechia Gdańsk Youth
- * Club domestic league appearances and goals

Jerzy Apolewicz (23 April 1938 – 12 May 2003) was a Polish footballer.

In his youth he played for Sparta Orunia, playing his professional career with Lechia Gdańsk. During his playing career he played at times either as a forward or in midfield.

Apolewicz ranks highly in Lechia Gdańsk records, appearing in the top 10 for both; most games played and goals scored for the club.

== Career ==
After playing with Sparta Orunia in his youth (later called "Start Gdańsk"), Apolewicz joined Lechia Gdańsk in 1958. He played his first game for Lechia at the beginning of the 1959 season against Ruch Chorzów, with his first goal coming against Górnik Radlin in the same season. During his early years Lechia played five seasons in the I liga, the top division in Poland, with the team finishing mid table for the first four seasons. In the fifth season since Apolewicz made his debut, Lechia were relegated from the I liga. During his time in the I liga, Apolewicz played 86 times, scoring 8 goals. After Lechia's relegation the rest of Apolewicz's career was spent in the II liga and the III liga, the second and third tiers. During the four seasons in the I liga, he played in 92 league games, scoring 20 goals. Apolewicz was involved in the first ever Tricity Derby for Lechia against the club's biggest rivals Arka Gdynia, starting the game as Lechia went on to win 2–1. Lechia suffered another relegation in 1967, seeing Lechia playing in the third tier for the first time in their history. Lechia were more competitive in the III liga, finishing in the top 3 four seasons out of five before winning promotion back to the II liga in 1972. In the III liga, Apolewicz played in a more attacking role at the club, scoring 29 goals in 70 appearances. Lechia's season back in the II liga was to be his last before he retired. He played just the one game that season, coming on as a substitute as Lechia drew 0–0 with Śląsk Wrocław. During his career Apolewicz amassed a total of 260 appearances and scoring 57 goals in all competitions.

== Personal life ==
Born in Vilnius, at the time part of the Second Polish Republic, Apolewicz and his family were forced to move to Gdańsk after the second world war due to the Polish population transfers which took place after the countries' borders changed.

Alongside his playing career Apolewicz was a motor mechanic by trade. Lechia Gdańsk honoured Apolewicz's time and achievements at the club by putting him on the "Avenue of Stars". This is a walkway at the MOSiR Stadium in Gdańsk with Lechia players of merit having their name in a golden star on the pavement. In the late 1980s he needed a right leg amputation after an embolism, and suffered a stroke in 1990. He died on 12 May 2003 and is buried at the Srebrzysko Cemetery in Gdańsk.
