= Andrzej Salach =

Polish footballer

Personal information
- Full name: Andrzej Salach
- Date of birth: 28 January 1959
- Place of birth: Gdańsk, Poland
- Date of death: 17 April 2009 (aged 50)
- Place of death: Gdańsk, Poland
- Height: 1.83 m (6 ft 0 in)
- Position: Defender

Senior career*
Years	Team	Apps	(Gls)
1977–1993	Lechia Gdańsk	305	(19)
- * Club domestic league appearances and goals

Andrzej Salach (28 January 1959 – 17 April 2009) was a Polish footballer who spent his entire professional career playing as a defender with Lechia Gdańsk.

== Football ==
Born in Gdańsk, Salach grew up training with his local team Lechia Gdańsk before being given his opportunity in the first team for the 1977–78 season, moving into the first team squad. He got his first appearance for Lechia playing 45 minutes against Gwardia Koszalin on 26 March 1978. Salach made seven appearances in his first season for Lechia, in what would end up being a long career for the club. In his first season, Lechia finished second in the league and finished third the season after. For the next two seasons, Lechia finished mid table, being relegated to the third tier at the end of the 1981–82 season. Despite being in the third tier, the following season proved to be a historical one for Lechia. Lechia immediately won promotion back to the II liga by winning the league, but also shocked everyone by winning the Polish Cup, beating Piast Gliwice 2–1. The following season Lechia started well by winning the Polish Super Cup by beating the Polish champions, Lech Poznań 1–0. Later that season, Lechia faced European footballing giants Juventus in a European competition due to the previous season's cup win. The difference in class was evident as Juventus won the two-legged tie 10–2 on aggregate. Lechia ended up winning the I liga at the end of the season, securing promotion to play in the Ekstraklasa for the first time in 22 years. Lechia's spell in the top tier lasted for four seasons, with Salach making 97 appearances in the Ekstraklasa scoring two goals. After relegation, Lechia did not fare well in the second tier and finished mid table the following five seasons. At the age of 34 and having played at Lechia Gdańsk for 16 seasons, Salach decided to retire. In total he made 337 appearances in all competitions, scoring 20 goals. After retiring from football, Salach moved to the United States before returning to Poland and Gdańsk in 2001. Even after his retirement, he often attended Lechia games until his sudden death on 17 April 2009. Salach died due to circulatory collapse at the age of 50.

== Personal life ==
Salach is commemorated by a star at the MOSiR Stadium in Gdańsk. The "Avenue of Stars" commemorates the efforts and success of former players and coaches.

== Honours ==
Lechia Gdańsk

- II liga, group I: 1983–84
- III liga, group I: 1982–83, runner-up: 1977–78
- Polish Cup: 1982–83
- Polish Super Cup: 1983
