= Jacek Chociej =

Polish footballer

Personal information
- Date of birth: 28 June 1965 (age 61)
- Place of birth: Skierniewice, Poland
- Height: 1.78 m (5 ft 10 in)
- Position: Forward

Youth career
- –1982: Vis Skierniewice
- 1982–1983: ŁKS Łódź

Senior career*
Years	Team	Apps	(Gls)
1983–1984	ŁKS Łódź	1	(0)
1984–1985	Unia Skierniewice		
1985–1987	Ursus Warsaw		
1987–1992	Lechia Gdańsk	139	(13)
- * Club domestic league appearances and goals

Jacek Chociej (born 28 June 1965) is a Polish former professional footballer who played as a forward. He is most well known for his spell with Lechia Gdańsk, having also made league appearances for ŁKS Łódź, Unia Skierniewice and Ursus Warsaw.

== Career ==
Born in Skierniewice, Chociej started his playing career with the youth levels of Vis Skierniewice. He joined ŁKS Łódź, going on to make one league appearance for the club in 1983. After leaving ŁKS, he had short spells with Unia Skierniewice and Ursus Warsaw, before joining Lechia Gdańsk in 1987. He made his Lechia debut on 14 March 1987 against Górnik Zabrze. His first two seasons with Lechia were in the top division, making 27 appearances and scoring one goal during that time period. The next 4 seasons were spent in the II liga, with Chociej retiring from football in 1992 having played his last game against Pogoń Szczecin on 6 June 1992. In total, he made 147 appearances and scored 13 goals in all competitions for Lechia.
