= Alfred Kokot =

Polish footballer (1928–1981)

Personal information
- Full name: Alfred Kokot
- Date of birth: 25 January 1928
- Place of birth: Chorzów, Poland
- Date of death: 20 June 1981 (aged 52)
- Place of death: Katowice, Poland
- Height: 1.57 m (5 ft 2 in)
- Position: Forward

Youth career
- Kresy Chorzów
- 1941–: Bergknappen Chorzów

Senior career*
Years	Team	Apps	(Gls)
–1945	Bergknappen Chorzów		
1945–1946	Flota Gdynia		
1946–1953	Lechia Gdańsk	82	(27)
1953–1954	Górnik 20 Katowice		
1954–1956	Górnik Zabrze	27	(2)
1957	Cracovia		
1958	Miedź Legnica		
1959–1961	Polonia Tychy		
1961–1963	Linodrut Zabrze		

International career
1949	Poland	1	(1)
- * Club domestic league appearances and goals

Alfred Kokot (25 January 1928 – 20 June 1981) was a Polish footballer who played as a forward.

== Biography ==
Kokot started his career playing with Kresy Chorzów and Bergknappen Chorzów during his youth years, with the latter being during World War II. His first professional role came with Flota Gdynia after the war, later joining Lechia Gdańsk in 1946. During his time with Lechia, Kokot made 82 appearances in the leagues, playing 128 times and scoring 51 goals in all competitions. During this period he was in the starting eleven which made Lechia's first ever appearance in Poland's top division, a 5–1 defeat to Cracovia. He also made his first, and only appearance for the Poland national team with his sole cap coming against Denmark, scoring the goal for Poland in their 2–1 defeat, becoming Lechia's first player to represent the national team. Kokot left Lechia in 1953, going on to play for Górnik 20 Katowice, make 27 league appearances for Górnik Zabrze, Cracovia, Miedź Legnica, Polonia Tychy, and Linodrut Zabrze. Kokot retired from football aged 38, and died in 1981 at the age of 53.

== Personal life ==
His brother was Henryk Kokot, a footballer who spent his career playing for Lechia Gdańsk.

Kokot is commemorated by a star at the MOSiR Stadium in Gdańsk. The "Avenue of Stars" commemorates the efforts and success of former players and coaches.
