= Alfred Kobylański =

Polish footballer

Personal information
- Full name: Alfred Kobylański
- Date of birth: 10 September 1925
- Place of birth: Łazy, Poland
- Date of death: 1 November 2009 (aged 84)
- Place of death: Gdynia, Poland
- Height: 1.68 m (5 ft 6 in)
- Position: Forward

Youth career
- Flota Gdynia

Senior career*
Years	Team	Apps	(Gls)
1951–1953	Polonia Warsaw	26	(8)
1954	Polonia Bydgoszcz	11	(0)
1955–1957	Lechia Gdańsk	38	(7)
Total		75	(15)
- * Club domestic league appearances and goals

Alfred Kobylański (10 September 1925 – 1 November 2009) was a Polish footballer who played as a forward.

== Biography ==
Kobylański's first club was Flota Gdynia, who he is known to have played for in the youth sides. He played for Polonia Warsaw from 1951 until 1953 and was part of the team who won the Polish Cup in 1952 by beating main rivals Legia Warsaw in the final. In total for Polonia he made 26 appearances and scored 8 goals in the Ekstraklasa. In 1954 he spent a season at Polonia Bydgoszcz, making 11 appearances, before moving to Lechia Gdańsk the following season. He made his Lechia debut on 25 March 1955 in the 1-0 defeat against Polonia Bytom. In his first season with Lechia he was again in a Polish Cup final against Legia Warsaw, this time being on the wrong end of a 5-0 defeat. In the 1956 season he played 12 times and scored 4 goals as Lechia achieved their greatest achievement in their early history by finishing 3rd in the I liga. He left the club midway through the following season having scored a total of 11 goals in 44 games for the club.

== Personal life ==
Kobylański's son is former Polish international and Olympic silver medalist Andrzej Kobylański, and his grandson is the footballer Martin Kobylański.

== Honours ==
Polonia Warsaw

- Polish Cup: 1952
