= Henryk Wieczorkowski =

Polish footballer

Personal information
- Full name: Henryk Wieczorkowski
- Date of birth: 14 May 1933
- Place of birth: Gdynia, Poland
- Date of death: 8 June 2000 (aged 67)
- Place of death: Gdynia, Poland
- Height: 1.70 m (5 ft 7 in)
- Position: Forward

Youth career
- Flota Gdynia

Senior career*
Years	Team	Apps	(Gls)
–1957	Flota Gdynia		
1957–1966	Lechia Gdańsk	181	(13)
- * Club domestic league appearances and goals

Henryk Wieczorkowski (14 May 1933 - 8 June 2000) was a Polish footballer who played as a forward. He spent his career playing for Flota Gdynia and Lechia Gdańsk.

== Biography ==
Born in Gdynia Wieczorkowski started playing football in the youth sides of his local team Flota Gdynia later playing for the club in the regional divisions. He joined Lechia Gdańsk in 1957 and made his debut for the club on 2 June 1957 in a 1-0 win over Lech Poznań in the I liga. In his first few seasons at the club, Lechia finished mid-table in the I liga. After a slow decline Lechia were relegated from the top division at the end of the 1962–63 season, with Wieczorkowski making 123 appearances and scoring 7 goals in the top division of Poland. The next 4 seasons saw Wieczorkowski playing in the II liga. In the 1964–65 season Lechia were involved in the first ever Tricity Derby against Arka Gdynia. Wieczorkowski started the game with Lechia beating their future main rivals 2-1. After 4 seasons in the second division Lechia were again relegated, this time to the III liga. Wieczorkowski retired from professional football at the end of that season, having made his final appearance against Victoria Jaworzno in September 1966. In total for Lechia he made 187 appearances and scored 13 goals. He is often praised by many fans due to the number of appearances he made for the club, putting him in an exclusive club of those who have played more than 100 times in the top division. Wieczorkowski died on 8 June 2000 aged 67.
