= Ryszard Przygodzki =

Polish footballer

Personal information
- Full name: Ryszard Przygodzki
- Date of birth: 2 April 1957 (age 69)
- Place of birth: Bydgoszcz, Poland
- Height: 1.72 m (5 ft 8 in)
- Position: Midfielder

Senior career*
Years	Team	Apps	(Gls)
- BKS Bydgoszcz
–1983	Odra Wodzisław Śląski		
1983–1984	Szombierki Bytom	22	(2)
1984–1986	Bałtyk Gdynia	54	(11)
1986–1989	Lechia Gdańsk	72	(9)
- * Club domestic league appearances and goals

Ryszard Przygodzki (born 2 April 1957) is a Polish former footballer who played as a midfielder. Przygodzki made a total of 127 appearances and scored 19 goals in Poland's top division.

== Biography ==
Born in Bydgoszcz, Przygodzki started playing football with local side BKS Bydgoszcz, eventually moving to II liga side Odra Wodzisław Śląski. He stayed playing with Odra until 1983 when he transferred to Top division side Szombierki Bytom. With Szombierki he made 22 appearances and scored 2 goals in the I liga, leaving the club at the end of the season after the team finished bottom in the league. He transferred to Bałtyk Gdynia, making his Bałtyk debut on 25 August 1984 against GKS Katowice. Przygodzki spent two seasons with Bałtyk, making a combined total of 54 appearances and scoring 11 goals in the I liga. After Bałtyk were relegated in his second season Przygodzki joined Lechia Gdańsk. He made his Lechia debut on 3 August 1986 against Zagłębie Lubin.

Przygodzki spent two seasons with Lechia in the I liga, making a further 51 appearances and scoring 6 more goals in Poland's top division, before being relegated from the league for a third time. His final season was spent with Lechia in the II liga before he retired. In total he made 74 appearances and scored 9 goals in all competitions for Lechia.
