= Janusz Orczykowski =

Polish footballer

Personal information
- Full name: Janusz Orczykowski
- Date of birth: 2 January 1944
- Place of birth: Warsaw, Poland
- Date of death: 17 November 2002 (aged 58)
- Place of death: Deerfield Beach, Florida, USA
- Height: 1.76 m (5 ft 9 in)
- Position: Forward

Youth career
- 1958–1962: ŁKS Łódź

Senior career*
| Years | Team | Apps | (Gls) |
| 1962–1964 | Zawisza Bydgoszcz | | |
| 1965–1967 | Cracovia | 32 | (15) |
| 1967–1968 | Start Łódź | | |
| 1968–1969 | Zawisza Bydgoszcz | | (5) |
| 1969–1974 | Lechia Gdańsk | 50 | (7) |
| 1974–75 | Boruta Zgierz | | |
| 1975 | White Eagle Philadelphia | | |
| 1976–1978 | Apollo New York | | |
- * Club domestic league appearances and goals

Janusz Orczykowski (2 January 1944 – 17 November 2002) was a Polish footballer who played as a forward.

== Biography ==
Born in Łódź, Orczykowski started playing football for his local club ŁKS Łódź. His time in the youth sides of ŁKS were successful with Orczykowski being part of the Polish Junior Championships win in 1962, with Orczykowski scoring the only goal in the final as they beat Legia Warsaw 1-0. In 1962 he moved to Zawisza Bydgoszcz, before joining Cracovia in 1965. While with Cracovia he played 32 times scoring 15 goals, including a season in the Polish top division. After a short spell with Start Łódź, Orczykowski moved back to Zawisza Bydgoszcz, scoring a total of 5 goals for the team over the next two seasons. His next move was to join Lechia Gdańsk, where he made his debut on 28 September 1969 against Calisia Kalisz, and scored a hattick in his second game in an 8-0 win over Gwardia Koszalin. In total for Lechia, Orczykowski played 55 times scoring 10 goals, with his last appearance for the club coming against Warta Poznań in 1974. After a short spell with Boruta Zgierz, Orczykowski moved to the United States where he played for White Eagle Philadelphia and Apollo New York. Orczykowski died on 17 November 2002, aged 58.
