= Maksymiuk =

Maksymiuk is a Polish and Ukrainian surname. Notable people with the surname include:

- Janusz Maksymiuk (born 1947), Polish politician
- Jerzy Maksymiuk (born 1936), Polish composer, pianist, and conductor

== See also ==
- Roman Maksymyuk (1974–2025), Ukrainian footballer and manager
