= Janusz Makowski =

Polish footballer

Personal information
- Full name: Janusz Makowski
- Date of birth: 19 June 1951
- Place of birth: Gdańsk, Poland
- Date of death: 2 March 2023 (aged 71)
- Height: 1.79 m (5 ft 10 in)
- Position: Left-back

Senior career*
| Years | Team | Apps | (Gls) |
| 1970–1981 | Lechia Gdańsk | 194 | (9) |
| 1981–1984 | Olimpia Elbląg | | |
- * Club domestic league appearances and goals

Janusz Makowski (19 June 1951 – 2 March 2023) was a Polish footballer who played as a left-back.

== Biography ==
Makowski started playing football in school with Zdzisław Puszkarz, following Puszkarz into joining the Lechia Gdańsk youth teams. Makowski broke into the Lechia first team in 1970, making his debut on 24 May 1970 against Gwardia Koszalin in the III liga. Makowski struggled to force his way into the team over the next few seasons until the 1973–74 season when he got into double figures with appearances for the first time, by this point, with Lechia playing in the II liga. Over the next seven seasons Makowski was part of a Lechia team that finished in 3rd place once and runners-up three times, coming closest to promotion in the 1975–1976 season when promotion went down to who won between Lechia or Arka Gdynia, with Arka ultimately winning the tie and Makowski being shown a red card after the game. Makowski spent over a decade with Lechia, making a total of 209 appearances, scoring 11 goals in all competitions. After his time at Lechia he joined Olimpia Elbląg for three seasons before returning to Gdańsk in 1984.
