= Janusz Charczuk =

Polish footballer

Personal information
- Full name: Janusz Charczuk
- Date of birth: 20 February 1941 (age 85)
- Place of birth: Sokal, Poland
- Height: 1.72 m (5 ft 8 in)
- Position: Forward

Youth career
- Stal Ustka
- –1959: Czarni Słupsk
- 1959: Lechia Gdańsk

Senior career*
Years	Team	Apps	(Gls)
1960–1968	Lechia Gdańsk	151	(23)
- * Club domestic league appearances and goals

Janusz Charczuk (born 20 February 1941) is a former Polish footballer who played as a forward spending his entire senior career with Lechia Gdańsk.

== Biography ==
Born in Sokal, near Lviv in what was occupied Poland in 1941 his family found themselves moving to Ustka after the second world war due to the relocation of Poles. After training with the youth teams for Stal Ustka and Czarni Słupsk he found himself joining the Lechia Gdańsk academy when he started to study architecture at the Gdańsk University of Technology in 1959. He made his Lechia debut on 13 March 1960 against Górnik Zabrze playing a total of 15 times in his first season. In 1964 Lechia played Arka Gdynia for the first time in the Tricity Derby with Charczuk being the first ever goalscorer in the derby in a 2–1 win for Lechia. In 1968 after gaining his architect's diploma Charczuk had to choose between a career in architecture or a career in football, choosing to pursue architecture instead. In total for Lechia he played 160 times scoring 24 goals. After spending time working in Gdańsk as an architect he moved with his family to the Chicago in the United States, settling in Canada in his later life. Charczuk is also a devoted Catholic and is also an artist. Some of his Catholic orientated art works have been displayed in the St. Mary's Church in Gdańsk.
