= Czesław Lenc =

Polish footballer (1926–1998)

Personal information
- Full name: Czesław Lenc
- Date of birth: 14 March 1926
- Place of birth: Chojnice, Poland
- Date of death: 7 January 1998 (aged 71)
- Place of death: Gdańsk, Poland
- Height: 1.74 m (5 ft 9 in)
- Position: Left-back

Senior career*
Years	Team	Apps	(Gls)
1945–1947	Chojniczanka Chojnice		
1948–1962	Lechia Gdańsk	215	(2)
Total		215	(2)
- * Club domestic league appearances and goals

Czesław Lenc (14 April 1926 – 7 January 1998) was a Polish footballer who played as a left-back. Born in Chojnice, Lenc started playing football with his local team Chojniczanka Chojnice in 1945, before moving to Lechia Gdańsk in 1948 and spending 14 seasons with the club.

== Biography ==
Lenc played three seasons with Chojniczanka, during which period he became an important player for the club. In 1948 he moved to Lechia Gdańsk where in his first season he helped Lechia win promotion to the I Liga by winning the league. Lenc was in the first Lechia team to play in the top division in 1949. During his time with Lechia he won the II liga, also finished as runners up once, reached the final of the Polish Cup, finished as runners-up after losing 5–0 to Legia Warsaw, and was involved in Lechia's joint highest finish in the Polish league, 3rd, which was achieved in 1956 and has only been matched once in 2019. In total he played 232 games, scoring 4 goals in all competitions with Lechia. Lenc features highly on the list of all-time appearances made for Lechia, and is currently 3rd on the list for appearances made in the top division with 182.

== Honours ==
Lechia Gdańsk

- Ekstraklasa third place: 1956
- Polish Cup runner-up: 1954–55
- II liga: 1951 (group I); runner-up: 1954
