= Tadeusz Skowroński =

Polish footballer

Personal information
- Full name: Tadeusz Skowroński
- Date of birth: 2 October 1921
- Place of birth: Poznań, Poland
- Date of death: 11 April 1988 (aged 66)
- Place of death: Warsaw, Poland
- Height: 1.70 m (5 ft 7 in)
- Position: Forward

Youth career
- –1937: Warta Poznań

Senior career*
Years	Team	Apps	(Gls)
1938–1939	Śmigły Wilno		
1946–1949	Lechia Gdańsk	35	(20)
1950–1951	Arkonia Szczecin	5	(1)
- * Club domestic league appearances and goals

Tadeusz Skowroński (2 October 1921 – 11 April 1988) was a Polish footballer who played as a forward. During his career, he played for Warta Poznań, Śmigły Wilno, Lechia Gdańsk and Arkonia Szczecin.

== Biography ==
Born in Poznań, Skowroński played for local side Warta Poznań advancing through the youth sides before leaving for Śmigły Wilno in 1938. In his second season with Śmigły, the outbreak of World War II with the Invasion of Poland put Skowroński's career on hold until 1945. Śmigły Wilno was dissolved in 1939, with Vilnius (Polish: Wilno) also becoming a Lithuanian city after the war ended. This led Skowroński to join newly created Lechia Gdańsk in 1946. Skowroński was an important player in Lechia's early history, helping the team to win their district league twice, one of them winning promotion to the I liga (modern day Ekstraklasa) and being part of the first Lechia team to play in Poland's top division in 1949. In his first season of top flight football, he played 15 games, scoring 4 goals. After the 1949 season, Skowroński left Lechia after the team finished bottom and got relegated. For the 1950 season, he moved to Arkonia Szczecin helping the team to win the II liga (group II) title, and promotion to the I liga. In the top division with Arkonia, he played 5 goals scoring once, being unable to help the side from finishing bottom and being relegated. The 1951 season is the last documented season of Skowroński's career, leading to the possibility that he retired after the season at the age of 30, and it is unknown what he did after his footballing career. Skowroński died on 11 April 1988 in Warsaw aged 66.

== Honours ==
Lechia Gdańsk

- II liga: 1947 (group III), 1948 (group IV)

Arkonia Szczecin

- II liga West: 1950
