= Marek Kowalczyk =

Polish footballer

Personal information
- Full name: Marek Kowalczyk
- Date of birth: 28 June 1961 (age 65)
- Place of birth: Kołobrzeg, Poland
- Height: 1.80 m (5 ft 11 in)
- Position: Forward

Youth career
- Wisła Tczew

Senior career*
Years	Team	Apps	(Gls)
–1981	Wisła Tczew		
1981–1986	Lechia Gdańsk	100	(16)
1986–1987	Arka Gdynia		
1988–1989	Kickers Offenbach		
1989–1992	Rot-Weiß Oberhausen		
- * Club domestic league appearances and goals

Marek Kowalczyk (born 28 June 1961) is a Polish former professional footballer who played as a forward.

Born in Kołobrzeg, Kowalczyk started his footballing career with Wisła Tczew, rising through the youth teams before playing for the first team. He is mostly known for his spell with Lechia Gdańsk with whom he won the Polish Cup, the Polish Super Cup, and became Lechia's first ever goalscorer in a European competition scoring against Juventus, all three achieved in 1983. In total Kowalczyk spent 5 seasons with Lechia, winning promotion from the third tier to the top tier during his short spell. He played a total of 116 games and scored 20 goals in all competitions.

== Honours ==
Lechia Gdańsk

- II liga West: 1983–84
- III liga, group II: 1982–83
- Polish Cup: 1982–83
- Polish Super Cup: 1983
