= Maciej Kamiński =

Polish footballer

Personal information
- Full name: Maciej Kamiński
- Date of birth: 19 May 1959 (age 67)
- Place of birth: Markowice, Poland
- Height: 1.68 m (5 ft 6 in)
- Position: Midfielder

Youth career
- Noteć Inowrocław

Senior career*
Years	Team	Apps	(Gls)
–1976	Noteć Inowrocław		
1976–1979	Goplania Inowrocław		
1979–1980	Zawisza Bydgoszcz		
1980–1983	Polonia Bydgoszcz		
1983–1989	Lechia Gdańsk	163	(19)
- * Club domestic league appearances and goals

Maciej Kamiński (born 15 May 1959) is a Polish former professional footballer who played as a midfielder.

== Biography ==
Kamiński began his career playing with the youth levels at Noteć Inowrocław, eventually progressing into the first team. During the 1975–76 season Kamiński was involved in Noteć's promotion winning squad from the regional leagues. After this season Kamiński joined Goplania Inowrocław, spending three seasons with the club. In 1979 he moved to Bydgoszcz, firstly playing with Zawisza Bydgoszcz for a season before joining Polonia Bydgoszcz for three seasons.

In 1983 Kamiński joined Lechia Gdańsk, making his debut on 30 July 1983 in the Polish Super Cup final against Lech Poznań. Lechia won by beating the Polish champions 1–0, with Kamiński playing the full game. In his first season with Lechia, he also played in both games as Lechia faced Italian giants Juventus in a European competition due to the previous season's Polish Cup win. Lechia also won promotion to the top division that season by winning the II liga for the 1983–84 season. Kamiński became an important player for Lechia upon their promotion to the I liga, becoming a starter for the next 4 seasons. In total Kamiński went on to make 109 appearances in Poland's top division before they were relegated to the second division. After one more season with the club Kamiński decided to retire from playing football at the start of the 1989–90 season. In total for Lechia Kamiński went on to make 181 appearances and scored 23 goals in all competitions.

== Honours ==
Lechia Gdańsk

- II liga West: 1983–84
- Polish Super Cup: 1983
