= Bartłomiej Stolc =

Polish footballer

Personal information
- Full name: Bartłomiej Stolc
- Date of birth: 3 April 1983 (age 43)
- Place of birth: Wejherowo, Poland
- Height: 1.77 m (5 ft 10 in)
- Position: Forward

Youth career
- –2000: Gryf Wejherowo
- 2000–2001: Lechia Gdańsk

Senior career*
Years	Team	Apps	(Gls)
2001–2003	Lechia Gdańsk	64	(68)
2004–2006	Kaszuby Połchowo		
2011	Skedsmo FK	2	(0)
2012–2013	Rælingen FK	31	(13)
2017–2018	Rælingen FK	3	(3)
2019	Aurskog-Finstadbru SK	13	(0)
- * Club domestic league appearances and goals

Bartłomiej Stolc (born 3 April 1983) is a Polish former professional footballer who played as a forward.

Stolc spent his early years playing for his local team Gryf Wejherowo progressing through their youth sides. In 2000 Stolc moved to Lechia Gdańsk, and joined the new Lechia Gdańsk entity which was separate from the Lechia-Polonia Gdańsk team. The new Lechia Gdańsk team had been formed, allowing the young Stolc to develop and flourished scoring many goals. By the time he had turned 20, Stolc had already played 76 games for Lechia in all competitions, scoring 81 goals. Other known teams Stolc has played for include Kaszuby Połchowo, and Norwegian teams Skedsmo FK, Rælingen FK, and Aurskog-Finstadbru SK.
