= Andrzej Głownia =

Polish footballer (1951–2024)

Personal information
- Date of birth: 9 November 1951
- Place of birth: Gdańsk, Poland
- Date of death: 22 September 2024 (aged 72)
- Position: Forward

Youth career
- 1965–1969: Lechia Gdańsk

Senior career*
Years	Team	Apps	(Gls)
1969–1970	Lechia Gdańsk	1	(0)
1970–1972	Flota Gdynia		
1972–1980	Lechia Gdańsk	204	(25)
1980–1981	Arka Gdynia	9	(1)
1981–1983	SC Vistula Garfield		
- * Club domestic league appearances and goals

Andrzej Głownia (9 November 1951 – 22 September 2024) was a Polish footballer who played as a forward.

== Biography ==
Głownia started his senior career with Lechia Gdańsk in 1969, making his debut in the team on 12 October 1969 in a 8–0 win against Gwardia Koszalin. This proved to be his only appearance during his first spell with Lechia, joining Flota Gdynia the season after. While at Flota, the team were involved in a friendly with Widzew Łódź who expressed an interest in Głownia after the match, however Głownia stated that the only club he wished to play for was with Lechia, a situation that was realised in 1972 when he returned to the club. During his second spell with Lechia, he played 8 seasons in the II liga, making a total of 204 appearances in the league during this time. In all competitions over his two spells with Lechia, Głownia made 217 appearances and scored 28 goals. In 1980, Głownia was given the chance to play in the I liga with Arka Gdynia. This was his only season with Arka, making nine appearances and scoring once in Poland's top division. At the end of the 1980–81 season, he emigrated to the United States, where he played for SC Vistula Garfield until 1983. At the end of his playing career, Głownia became a newsagent. He died on 22 September 2024, at the age of 72.
