= Jakub Bławat =

Polish footballer

Personal information
- Full name: Jakub Bławat
- Date of birth: 31 March 1982 (age 44)
- Place of birth: Gdynia, Poland
- Height: 1.75 m (5 ft 9 in)
- Position: Forward

Senior career*
Years	Team	Apps	(Gls)
2001–2003	KP Sopot		
2004–2006	Lechia Gdańsk	24	(14)
2005–2006	→ Cartusia Kartuzy (loan)		
2006–2008	Olimpia Osowa		
2008–2010	KP Sopot		
- * Club domestic league appearances and goals

Jakub Bławat (born 31 March 1982) is a Polish former footballer who played as a forward.

== Career ==
Bławat started his career with the youth levels of KP Sopot, joining the first team in 2001. In 2003 he gained attention in the KP Sopot win over Lechia Gdańsk, in which he scored two goals. It was his performance in this match which ultimately got him a transfer to Lechia Gdańsk in the next transfer window. He made his Lechia debut against Wybrzeże Objazda on 28 March 2004, and went on to play 8 games and scored 9 goals for the rest of that season as Lechia won the IV liga (fourth tier). The following season Lechia once again won promotion, with Jakub Bławat contributing 5 goals in 14 games. During the 2005-06 season Bławat had a falling out with the manager Marcin Kaczmarek, and was loaned to Cartusia Kartuzy as a result. His final appearance for Lechia came in the II liga against Zagłębie Sosnowiec. After his contract was not renewed at the end of the season Bławat joined Olimpia Osowa before finishing his playing career with KP Sopot.

== Honours ==
Lechia Gdańsk

- III liga (group II): 2004-05
- IV liga (pomeranian group): 2003-04
