= Przemysław Urbański =

Polish footballer (born 1982)

Personal information
- Full name: Przemysław Urbański
- Date of birth: 4 January 1982 (age 44)
- Place of birth: Lubań, Poland
- Height: 1.70 m (5 ft 7 in)
- Position: Forward

Youth career
- –2001: Lechia Gdańsk

Senior career*
Years	Team	Apps	(Gls)
2001–2004	Lechia Gdańsk	71	(21)
2005	Unia Tczew	13	(0)
2005–2007	Czarni Pruszcz Gdański		
- Bałtyk Gdynia
- GKS Kowale
- * Club domestic league appearances and goals

Przemysław Urbański (born 4 January 1982) is a Polish footballer who played as a forward. Urbański played his football in the Pomeranian region of Poland, starting his career with Lechia Gdańsk, also playing for Unia Tczew, Czarni Pruszcz Gdański, Bałtyk Gdynia, and GKS Kowale. Since retiring from football Urbański has moved into a coaching role at Lechia Gdańsk working with the Lechia Gdańsk academy. Urbański is the father of professional Polish football player Kacper Urbański.
