= Mirosław Giruć =

Polish footballer

Personal information
- Date of birth: 23 October 1972 (age 54)
- Place of birth: Gdańsk, Poland
- Height: 1.72 m (5 ft 8 in)
- Positions: Midfielder; forward

Youth career
- –1989: Lechia Gdańsk

Senior career*
Years	Team	Apps	(Gls)
1989–1994	Lechia Gdańsk	151	(13)
1994–1995	SG Wattenscheid 09	5	(0)
1994–1996	→ SG Wattenscheid 09 II	16	(0)
1996–1997	Atlas Delmenhorst	9	(1)
1997–1999	Rot-Weiss Essen	62	(4)
1999–2005	1. FC Bocholt	155	(12)
Total		388	(30)
- * Club domestic league appearances and goals

Mirosław Giruć (born 23 October 1972) is a Polish former professional footballer who played as a midfielder and at times as a forward. He spent his career playing in Poland and Germany.

== Biography ==
Born in Gdańsk, Giruć started playing in the youth sides of his local team, Lechia Gdańsk. He made his first team debut on 28 May 1989 in the win against Broń Radom. For the next five seasons Giruć became an important player for Lechia, becoming a regular starter and featuring in most of the games over those five seasons. Before leaving Lechia in 1994 Giruć had made 157 appearances and scored 14 goals in all competitions.

After leaving Lechia he joined recently relegated SG Wattenscheid 09, playing in 2. Bundesliga. In his first season with Wattenscheid he made five appearances and scored once in the league. In his second season with the club he was dropped from the team playing in the 2. Bundesliga, instead playing with the SG Wattenscheid 09 II team. At the end of the season he left Wattenscheid and played in the lower divisions in Germany, playing with Atlas Delmenhorst, Rot-Weiss Essen, and 1. FC Bocholt, before retiring in 2005.
