= Henryk Kokot =

Polish footballer

Personal information
- Full name: Henryk Kokot
- Date of birth: 27 October 1926
- Place of birth: Chorzów, Poland
- Date of death: 22 May 1997 (aged 70)
- Place of death: Gdańsk, Poland
- Height: 1.76 m (5 ft 9 in)
- Position: Midfielder

Youth career
- AKS Chorzów

Senior career*
Years	Team	Apps	(Gls)
1946–1952	Lechia Gdańsk	65	(16)
- * Club domestic league appearances and goals

Henryk Kokot (27 October 1926 – 22 May 1997) was a Polish footballer who played as a midfielder.

== Career ==
Kokot is known to have started playing football in his youth for AKS Chorzów. In 1946 Kokot joined Lechia Gdańsk, where he played until 1952. During this period he was in the starting eleven which made Lechia's first ever appearance in Poland's top division, a 5–1 defeat to Cracovia. In total he played 86 games and scored 20 goals for Lechia.

== Personal life ==
His brother was Alfred Kokot, a footballer who played for the Poland national team.

Kokot is commemorated by a star at the MOSiR Stadium in Gdańsk. The "Avenue of Stars" commemorates the efforts and success of former players and coaches.
