= Rafał Kaczmarczyk =

Polish footballer

Personal information
- Date of birth: 2 June 1972 (age 54)
- Place of birth: Dzierzgoń, Poland
- Height: 1.76 m (5 ft 9 in)
- Position: Midfielder

Youth career
- –1989: Powiśle Dzierzgoń

Senior career*
Years	Team	Apps	(Gls)
1989–1994	Lechia Gdańsk	127	(12)
1995–1998	Stomil Olsztyn	98	(10)
1998–2001	Widzew Łódź	78	(3)
2001–2002	Górnik Zabrze	31	(5)
2003–2005	Dyskobolia	26	(1)
2006	→ Obra Kościan (loan)		
2005–2006	Górnik Łęczna	18	(0)
2007–2008	Wierzyca Pelplin	16	(0)
2008	Orkan Rumia		
2011–2012	Powiśle Dzierzgoń		

International career
1996–1997	Poland	2	(0)
- * Club domestic league appearances and goals

Rafał Kaczmarczyk (born 2 June 1972) is a Polish former professional footballer who played as a midfielder. Kaczmarczyk played several seasons in the Polish Ekstraklasa with Stomil Olsztyn, Widzew Łódź, Górnik Zabrze, Dyskobolia and Górnik Łęczna. He also made two appearances for the Poland national team.
