= Marek Hartman =

Polish footballer

Personal information
- Date of birth: 7 February 1947 (age 79)
- Place of birth: Gdańsk, Poland
- Height: 1.76 m (5 ft 9 1/2 in)
- Position: Forward

Senior career*
Years	Team	Apps	(Gls)
1965–1969	Lechia Gdańsk	74	(24)
- * Club domestic league appearances and goals

Marek Hartman (born 7 February 1947) was a Polish footballer who played as a forward, and later a director and university professor.

== Biography ==
Born in Gdańsk, Hartman started playing football with local team Lechia Gdańsk, making his debut on 9 May 1965 against Victoria Jaworzno. At the start of his career, Hartman played with Lechia in the II liga, making a total of 34 appearances in Poland's second division. During the 1966–67 league season Lechia suffered relegation to the III liga. Hartman played a further two full seasons before retiring at the start of the 1969–70 season to focus on an academic career, stating that he had lost the motivation to continue playing football. In total for Lechia he made 75 appearances and scored 24 goals in all competitions.

Before retiring from football at the age of 23 Hartman had attained his master's degree. He was given a scholarship in the UK, returning to Poland in 1988, and becoming the director of the Electrotechnical Institute faculty at the Gdańsk University of Technology. In 2006 he became the director of the Technical College of Communications at Gdańsk Tech, holding this role until his formal retirement in 2012.
