= Józef Gładysz =

Polish footballer, manager, and coach

Personal information
- Full name: Józef Gładysz
- Date of birth: 22 August 1952 (age 74)
- Place of birth: Gdańsk, Poland
- Height: 1.78 m (5 ft 10 in)
- Position: Defender

Youth career
- 1964–1970: Lechia Gdańsk

Senior career*
| Years | Team | Apps | (Gls) |
| 1970–1982 | Lechia Gdańsk | 221 | (9) |

Managerial career
- 1996–1997: Lechia Gdańsk
- 1998: Warmia Olsztyn
- * Club domestic league appearances and goals

Józef Gładysz (born 22 August 1952) is a Polish football manager and former player. He spent his entire playing career with Lechia Gdańsk.

== Football ==
During his career, Gładysz played for Lechia Gdańsk, making his senior debut in a 1–0 over Calisia Kalisz in 1970. In total, Gładysz played a total of 231 games in all competitions, and scored 9 goals. He retired from playing in 1982, and joined the Lechia coaching staff. He was part of the coaching staff when Lechia won both the Polish Cup and the Polish Super Cup in 1983. He has held many different coaching roles for Lechia, and in 1996, he became the manager of Lechia Gdańsk. His only role away from Lechia was when he was manager of Warmia Olsztyn for four months in 1998. After his time at Warmia, Gładysz returned to Lechia and since has mostly worked with the Lechia II team and academy.
