= Maciej Kozak =

Polish footballer (1971–2015)

Personal information
- Full name: Maciej Kozak
- Date of birth: 10 December 1971
- Place of birth: Gdańsk, Poland
- Date of death: 26 July 2015 (aged 43)
- Place of death: Gdańsk, Poland
- Height: 1.87 m (6 ft 2 in)
- Position: Goalkeeper

Youth career
- 1984: MRKS Gdańsk
- 1985–1988: Lechia Gdańsk

Senior career*
Years	Team	Apps	(Gls)
1989–1995	Lechia Gdańsk	134	(0)
1995–1996	Olimpia-Lechia Gdańsk	0	(0)
1996	Cracovia Chicago		
1997–1998	Lechia Gdańsk	37	(0)
1999	Windsor Eagles		
1999	Potok Pszczółki		
1999–2001	Lechia-Polonia Gdańsk	32	(0)
2002–2003	Gedania Gdańsk		
2005–2007	Grunke Somonino		
2007	Zatoka Puck		
2008–2009	Grunke Somonino		
2009	GKS Żukowo		
- * Club domestic league appearances and goals

Maciej Kozak (10 December 1971 – 26 July 2015) was a Polish footballer who played as a goalkeeper. Kozak spent the majority of his professional playing career with Lechia Gdańsk before having short spells in the US, UK and at lower league clubs in Poland.

== Biography ==
Being born in Gdańsk Kozak started playing in the youth sides with his local team MRKS Gdańsk before making the move to join Lechia Gdańsk. After 3 years of playing in the youth team he made his Lechia debut on 4 March 1990 against GKS Jastrzębie. Over the next six seasons he made 134 appearances for Lechia in the II liga. In 1995 Lechia were involved in a merger with Olimpia Poznań creating the Olimpia-Lechia Gdańsk team. Kozak found himself as the second choice goalkeeper for the team that season, failing to make an appearance in the I liga, instead making his only appearance for the Olimpia-Lechia team in the Polish Cup. He had a brief spell in the US playing for Cracovia Chicago before returning to Lechia six months later. During his second spell with Lechia he made a further 37 league appearances before leaving to have a short stint playing in the UK with Windsor Eagles and returning to Poland to play with Potok Pszczółki. During this time Lechia were involved in another merger, this time with Polonia Gdańsk creating the Lechia-Polonia Gdańsk, with Kozak returning for his third spell at the club in 1999. After making 32 more league appearances he joined Gedania Gdańsk before stopping playing football. During his three spells at Lechia he made a total of 213 appearances in all competitions. Kozak took two years out of playing returning to play for Grunke Somonino, Zatoka Puck and GKS Żukowo between 2005 and 2009, becoming a goalkeeping coach for Lechia in 2008. Kozak was diagnosed with having cancer, the news becoming public in 2014. He continued working as a coach with the Lechia academy before becoming too unwell and staying in a hospice. He died on 26 July 2015 aged 43.
