= Leszek Goździk =

Polish footballer and manager

Personal information
- Full name: Leszek Goździk
- Date of birth: 20 January 1922
- Place of birth: Tomaszów Mazowiecki, Poland
- Date of death: 27 December 1983 (aged 61)
- Place of death: Gdańsk, Poland
- Height: 1.76 m (5 ft 9 in)
- Position: Forward

Senior career*
Years	Team	Apps	(Gls)
–1947	Okęcie Warsaw		
1947–1955	Lechia Gdańsk	117	(48)

Managerial career
- 1958: Lechia Gdańsk
- * Club domestic league appearances and goals

Leszek Goździk (20 January 1922 – 27 December 1983) was a Polish football player and manager.

== Career ==
Goździk started his playing career with Okęcie Warsaw, playing with the team until 1947. In the summer of 1947, Goździk moved to Lechia Gdańsk where he played until 1955, making a total of 127 appearances and scoring 52 goals in all competitions. His time at Lechia saw three promotions and two relegations, and he was part of the first Lechia team to play in Poland's top division.

In 1958, Goździk became the manager of Lechia, leaving the role in the same year of his appointment.

== Honours ==
Lechia Gdańsk

- Klasa A (Divisional Leagues) Gdańsk group: 1947, 1948
- II liga (Group A): 1951
- II liga runner-up: 1954
- Polish Cup runner-up: 1955
