= Hubert Kusz =

Polish association football player

Personal information
- Full name: Hubert Kusz
- Date of birth: 21 September 1928
- Place of birth: Chorzów, Poland
- Date of death: 4 August 2017 (aged 88)
- Place of death: Bydgoszcz, Poland
- Height: 1.70 m (5 ft 7 in)
- Position: Defender

Youth career
- 1942–1946: AKS Chorzów

Senior career*
Years	Team	Apps	(Gls)
1946–1948	Polonia Świdnica		
1949–1960	Lechia Gdańsk	174	(2)
- * Club domestic league appearances and goals

Hubert Kusz (21 September 1928 – 4 August 2017) was a Polish footballer who played as a defender. He spent more than 10 years of his professional career playing for Lechia Gdańsk.

== Biography ==
Born in Chorzów Kusz starting playing football for his local team AKS Chorzów. After a few seasons of playing with Polonia Świdnica Kusz joined Lechia Gdańsk, a decision partly made due to knowing Lechia player Roman Rogocz from his time at AKS Chorzów. He made his Lechia debut on 24 April 1949 against Warta Poznań. Kusz played in what was known as the golden period in Lechia's early history, playing in Lechia's Polish Cup final defeat in 1955 and playing 18 times in the 1956 season when Lechia finished in 3rd place, the team's greatest league achievement until it was equaled in 2019. After that historic season Lechia finished the next few seasons until Kusz's retirement in mid-table positions. In total Kusz made 182 appearances and scoring 2 goals for Lechia, retiring in 1960.

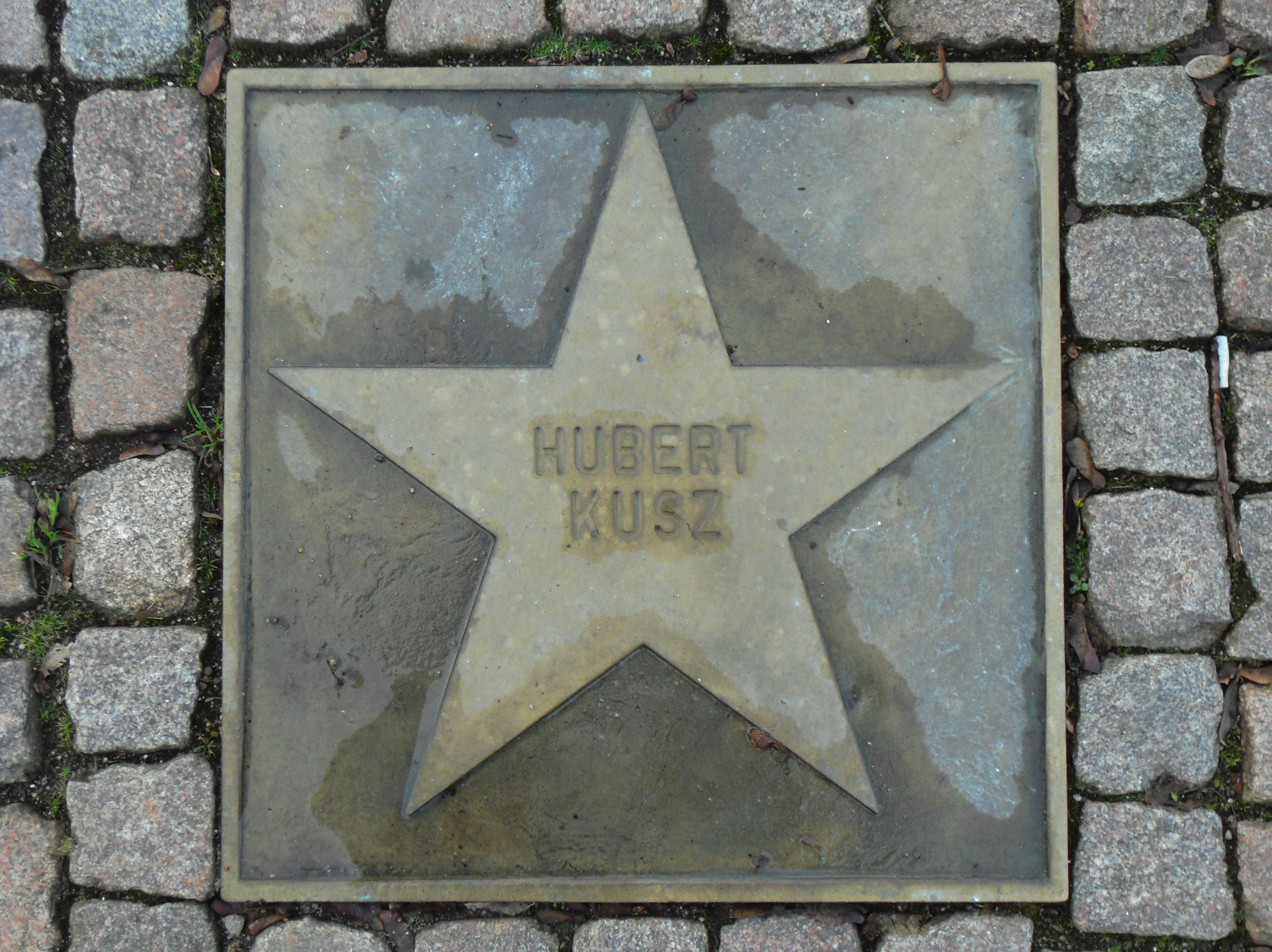
Hubert Kusz's star on the "Avenue of Stars"

In 2011, Kusz was awarded the Cross of Merit for achievements in football and its popularization. The same year he was honoured with a star on Lechia's "Avenue of Stars", a way the club has commemorated Lechia Gdańsk legends.

Kusz died in Bydgoszcz on 4 August 2017 aged 89, with his funeral taking place on 9 August.

== Awards ==
- 2011: Gold Cross of Merit
