= Jerzy Sionek =

Polish footballer

Personal information
- Full name: Jerzy Sionek
- Date of birth: 30 October 1939 (age 86)
- Place of birth: Poland
- Height: 1.67 m (5 ft 5 1/2 in)
- Position: Midfielder

Senior career*
Years	Team	Apps	(Gls)
- Polonia Iłża
–1963	RKS Stocznia Północna		
1963–1967	Lechia Gdańsk	70	(19)
1968–	Wisła Tczew		
- * Club domestic league appearances and goals

Jerzy Sionek (born 30 October 1939) is a former Polish footballer who played as a midfielder.

== Life ==
Sionek started his career playing with Polonia Iłża, playing at an early age, and playing some part of Polonia's promotion from the fifth tier in 1953. Over the following seasons he played for Polonia in the IV liga, helping the team to record high finishes in the league. It is known that at some point Sionek moved to Gdańsk and started playing with RKS Stocznia Północna, playing a role in the team's promotion to the III liga. In 1963 Sionek joined Lechia Gdańsk, making his debut in the Polish Cup against Sparta Gryfice. His time with Lechia was the pinacle of his career, with Sionek making 63 appearances in the II liga over the span of three seasons. In 1967 Lechia were relegated to the III liga, with Sionek playing the first half of the season before joining Wisła Tczew during the mid-season break. He is known to have played with Wisła for four seasons from 1968 until at least 1972, however it is not known when he left Wisła Tczew or when he decided to retire from playing.
