= Edmund Wierzyński =

Polish footballer

Personal information
- Full name: Edmund Wierzyński
- Date of birth: 21 January 1939 (age 87)
- Place of birth: Gdańsk, Poland
- Height: 1.78 m (5 ft 10 in)
- Positions: Defender; midfielder

Youth career
- 1953–1959: Lechia Gdańsk

Senior career*
Years	Team	Apps	(Gls)
1960–1961	Flota Gdynia		
1961–1969	Lechia Gdańsk	176	(20)
1970–1971	MRKS Gdańsk		
- * Club domestic league appearances and goals

Edmund Wierzyński (born 21 January 1939) is a Polish former footballer who played as a defender and midfielder. He made 37 appearances and scored 1 goal in Poland's top division.

== Football ==
Born in Gdańsk, Wierzyński started playing football with his local side Lechia Gdańsk, helping Lechia win the Junior Polish Championship's in 1957. He played in defence and midfield during his career, with one player describing Wierzyński's role on the pitch as what would be described as a defensive midfielder nowadays. In 1960 moved to spend two seasons playing with Flota Gdynia before returning to Lechia in late 1961. He made his Lechia debut on 19 November 1961 in the I liga playing against Polonia Bytom. Over the next two seasons Wierzyński made a further 36 appearances in the I liga before the club suffered relegation in 1963. The next four seasons were spent playing in the II liga, with Wierzyński being virtually ever present in the side during this time, making 117 appearances and scoring 7 goals during this time. In 1967 Lechia were relegated again, spending his final 3 seasons with Lechia playing in the III liga. During this time he made 22 appearances and scored 12 goals. In total for Lechia he played in 185 games and scored 20 goals in all competitions. For the 1970–71 season he played with MRKS Gdańsk before retiring from playing.

== Personal life ==
Wierzyński's name has also been documented as being spelled as "Wierżyński" and "Wierziński", while also being known to sometimes go by the first name "Edward". After his playing career he moved to Hamburg in Germany, and has gone by the last name "Austen".
