= Leonard Radowski =

Polish footballer (1952–2025)

Personal information
- Date of birth: 4 August 1952
- Place of birth: Gdańsk, Poland
- Date of death: 3 November 2025 (aged 73)
- Place of death: Poland
- Position: Forward

Senior career*
| Years | Team | Apps | (Gls) |
| –1974 | MRKS Gdańsk | | |
| 1974–1980 | Lechia Gdańsk | 129 | (22) |
| 1980–? | Olimpia Elbląg | | |
- * Club domestic league appearances and goals

Leonard Radowski (4 August 1952 – 3 November 2025) was a Polish professional footballer who played as a forward. He started his career playing in Gdańsk with MRKS Gdańsk. In 1974, aged 22 Radowski joined II liga side Lechia Gdańsk. He made his Lechia debut on 18 August 1974 playing in a 3–0 win against Bałtyk Gdynia. He spent six seasons with Lechia, during this time he made 137 appearances and scored 28 goals in all competitions. In 1980, Radowski joined Olimpia Elbląg, and it is known that he was part of the Olimpia squad that won the 1980–81 III liga (group II), and being one of the few Olimpia squads to play in the Polish second division. It is unknown how long he spent with Olimpia, or at which point he retired from playing football. Radowski died on 3 November 2025, at the age of 73.

== Honours ==
Olimpia Elbląg

- III liga (group II): 1980–81
