= Krzysztof Matuszewski =

Polish footballer

Personal information
- Full name: Krzysztof Matuszewski
- Date of birth: 1953 (age 72–73)
- Place of birth: Poland
- Position: Forward

Senior career*
Years	Team	Apps	(Gls)
–1974	Olimpia Elbląg		
1974–1980	Lechia Gdańsk	127	(29)
1982	Lechia Gdańsk	5	(0)
- * Club domestic league appearances and goals

Krzysztof Matuszewski (born in 1953) was a Polish footballer who played as a forward. Matuszewski supposedly joined Lechia Gdańsk from Olimpia Elbląg in 1974. He made his Lechia debut on 18 August 1974 playing in a 3–0 win over Bałtyk Gdynia. During the latter part of the 1970's Matuszewski became an important first team player, going on to make 127 appearances and scoring 29 goals in the II liga over 6 seasons. He left Lechia for the 1980–1981 season, returning to Lechia for the second half of the 1981–1982 season. During his second spell at the club he made a further 5 league appearances, and made a total of 142 appearances and scored 33 goals in all competitions while at Lechia Gdańsk.
