= Bogdan Adamczyk =

Polish footballer

Personal information
- Full name: Bogdan Adamczyk
- Date of birth: 27 October 1935 (age 91)
- Place of birth: Radom, Poland
- Height: 1.76 m (5 ft 9 in)
- Position: Forward

Youth career
- 1947–1954: Lechia Gdańsk

Senior career*
Years	Team	Apps	(Gls)
1954–1956	Lechia Gdańsk	26	(2)
1956–1957	Zawisza Bydgoszcz		
1957–1965	Lechia Gdańsk	178	(72)
1965–1967	Polonia Sydney		
Total		204	(74)
- * Club domestic league appearances and goals

Bogdan Adamczyk (born 27 November 1935) is a Polish former footballer who played as a forward. Adamczyk spent the majority of his career playing for Lechia Gdańsk, with the exceptions of playing two seasons with Zawisza Bydgoszcz, and two years in Australia playing for Polonia Sydney.

== Senior career ==
In 1954, Adamczyk made his Lechia debut against Górnik Zabrze, in the first game of the season. In his second professional season Adamczyk was playing in the top flight with Lechia, and was playing regularly for the team. He scored his first Ekstraklasa goal against Wisła Kraków, his third game of playing in the highest division. From 1956 to 1957, Adamczyk was called up for his military service, and as a result spent those two years playing for Zawisza Bydgoszcz, a team which started as a military sponsored sports club.

In 1958, Adamczyk returned to Lechia and found himself back in the starting team. In his first year back, he scored a total of 11 goals making him the club's top scorer, and was his highest tally in the top division in a single season. In 1962, Adamczyk played his 100th game in the Ekstraklasa, an occasion with which he scored a goal for Lechia.

Adamczyk's goals were not enough to keep Lechia in the top division, and within a few years Lechia found themselves playing in the third tier. It was at this time Adamczyk decided to leave Lechia, with whom he had played 117 games and scoring 36 goals in the Ekstraklasa for Lechia. Adamczyk was Lechia's highest goalscorer in the Ekstraklasa until Flávio Paixão broke his record in 2018.

In 1965, Adamczyk moved to Sydney, Australia, to play for Polonia Sydney, a team started in Sydney by Polish immigrants. Adamczyk finally retired from football in 1967 having played in Australia for 2 years.

== Awards ==
- 2011: Gold Cross of Merit, for achievements in football and its popularization
