= Piotr Cetnarowicz =

Polish footballer

Personal information
- Full name: Piotr Tomasz Cetnarowicz
- Date of birth: 19 May 1973 (age 53)
- Place of birth: Iława, Poland
- Height: 1.92 m (6 ft 3 1/2 in)
- Position: Striker

Senior career*
Years	Team	Apps	(Gls)
- Pogoń Prabuty
1995–1996	Rodło Kwidzyn		
1996–1997	Pomezania Malbork		
1997–1998	Groclin	1	(0)
1997–1999	Jeziorak Iława		
1998–2001	Górnik Łęczna		
2000–2001	Ceramika Opoczno		
2001–2002	Górnik Łęczna		
2001–2002	KSZO Ostrowiec Świętokrzyski	7	(2)
2002–2003	Górnik Łęczna	12	(4)
2002–2003	Podbeskidzie Bielsko-Biała	12	(2)
2003	Kryvbas Kryvyi Rih	6	(0)
2003	Kryvbas-2 Kryvyi Rih	1	(0)
2004–2005	Świt Nowy Dwór Mazowiecki	7	(0)
2004–2005	MG MZKS Kozienice		
2005–2006	Tur Turek		
2006–2009	Lechia Gdańsk	77	(23)
2009–2011	Orkan Rumia	18	(3)
2011–2012	Rodlo Kwidzyn		
- * Club domestic league appearances and goals

Piotr Cetnarowicz (born 19 May 1973) is a Polish former professional footballer who played as a striker.

== Honours ==
Lechia Gdańsk

- II liga: 2007–08
