= Zbigniew Żemojtel =

Polish footballer

Personal information
- Full name: Zbigniew Żemojtel
- Date of birth: 24 March 1943
- Place of birth: Zagóra, Poland
- Date of death: 9 January 1995 (aged 51)
- Place of death: Poland
- Height: 1.72 m (5 ft 8 in)
- Position: Defender

Youth career
- –1962: Lechia Gdańsk

Senior career*
Years	Team	Apps	(Gls)
1962–1968	Lechia Gdańsk	135	(1)
1968–1972	Arka Gdynia		
1972–1976	Lechia Gdańsk	67	(0)
Total		202	(1)
- * Club domestic league appearances and goals

Zbigniew Żemojtel (24 March 1943 – 9 January 1995) was a Polish footballer who played as a defender. Żemojtel spent his career playing in the Tricity area of Poland, playing for both Lechia Gdańsk and Arka Gdynia.

== Biography ==
Żemojtel started playing football in the youth teams of Lechia Gdańsk, making his debut aged 19 on 12 August 1962 against Stal Rzeszów. In his first season with Lechia the team played in the I liga, with Żemojtel making 21 appearances in Poland's top division. At the end of that season Lechia were relegated to the II liga, finishing second from bottom. The next four seasons saw Lechia playing in the II liga, being relegated again at the end of the 1966–67. The next season in the III liga Żemojtel played only four games, but scored his only goal for Lechia, scoring against Flota Gdynia. Due to Żemojtel being unhappy with Lechia's league position he left to join Arka Gdynia who were playing in the league above. After four seasons at Arka Żemojtel expressed an interest to return to Lechia, he joined again a few games into the season after Arka initially blocked the transfer. After rejoining Lechia in 1972 he played three more seasons in the II liga, stopping playing in 1975. After nearly a year out of playing Żemojtel played two more games for Lechia with his last appearance coming against Stoczniowiec Gdańsk on 17 June 1976. In total for Lechia he made 213 appearances and scored 1 goal. He died on 9 January 1995 aged 51. Since his death there has been an annual game heal by the Lechia Gdańsk Oldboje team called the Memorial of Zbigniew Żemojtel (Polish: Memoriał Zbigniewa Żemojtela). Żemojtel is commemorated by a star at the MOSiR Stadium in Gdańsk. The "Avenue of Stars" commemorates the efforts and success of former players and coaches.
