= Bronisław Szlagowski =

Polish footballer

Personal information
- Date of birth: 23 January 1938 (age 88)
- Place of birth: Pruszcz Gdański, Free City of Danzig
- Height: 1.78 m (5 ft 10 in)
- Position: Midfielder

Youth career
- –1956: Lechia Gdańsk

Senior career*
Years	Team	Apps	(Gls)
1957	Lechia Gdańsk	11	(6)
1957–1958	Werder Bremen		
1958–1960	Rot-Weiß Oberhausen	49	(25)
1960–1961	FSV Frankfurt		
1961–1963	FC St. Pauli	6	(1)
1963–1964	Wormatia Worms	9	(0)
1964–1965	Holstein Kiel		
1965–1966	Rot-Weiß Oberhausen		
- * Club domestic league appearances and goals

Bronisław Szlagowski (born 23 January 1938) is a Polish retired professional footballer who played as a midfielder. He started his career in Poland with Lechia Gdańsk before spending the rest of his career in Germany, where he was known as Horst Schlagowski.

== Career ==
Szlagowski was born in Pruszcz Gdański in the Free City of Danzig in 1938. He started his playing career with a local team, Lechia Gdańsk. In his debut season he made 11 top flight appearances and scored six goals. Szlagowski's six goals in 11 games, a ratio of 0.55 goals per game is still a Lechia record for goals per game in the top division, with his hat-trick against Zagłębie Sosnowiec in a 5–0 win was the clubs first in the top division.

In September 1957 Szlagowski moved to Germany, starting with playing for Werder Bremen. After a season with Werder Bremen, Szlagowski joined Rot-Weiß Oberhausen for two seasons. During this time he made 49 league appearances and scored 25 goals, including scoring four in one match against Alemannia Aachen. Szlagowski then joined FSV Frankfurt for a season, notably scoring in a 4–1 win over Bayern Munich. Szlagowski went on to have short stints with FC St. Pauli, Wormatia Worms and Holstein Kiel before retiring after his second spell with Rot-Weiß Oberhausen.
