= Jan Kierno =

Polish association football player

Personal information
- Full name: Jan Kierno
- Date of birth: 20 June 1952 (age 74)
- Place of birth: Lidzbark Warmiński, Poland
- Height: 1.68 m (5 ft 6 in)
- Position: Forward

Senior career*
Years	Team	Apps	(Gls)
–1971	Polonia Lidzbark Warmiński		
1971–1974	Lechia Gdańsk	8	(0)
1976–1977	Olimpia Elbląg		
1977–1979	Gwardia Warsaw		
1980–1981	Lechia Gdańsk	43	(6)
1982–?	Polonia Adelaide		
- * Club domestic league appearances and goals

Jan Kierno (born 20 June 1952) is a Polish former footballer who played as a forward.

== Biography ==
Born in Lidzbark Warmiński, Kierno started playing football with local side Polonia Lidzbark Warmiński. In 1971, Kierno moved to Gdańsk to play with Lechia Gdańsk. During his first season, he didn't manage to break into the first team, making his Lechia debut the following season on 29 April 1973 against Wisłoka Dębica. During his first three years with Lechia, Kierno made eight appearances in the II liga. After Lechia, Kierno played for Olimpia Elbląg during the 1976–77 season, with it being a possibility he played for the team the two seasons prior too. After that, Kierno joined Gwardia Warsaw, winning the II liga northern group in his first season, and thus winning promotion to Poland's top division. In the I liga, Kierno made 26 top flight appearances and scored four goals. In 1980, Kierno returned to Lechia, making a further 43 appearances and six goals in the league, and a total of 56 appearances and seven goals in all competitions during his two spells with the club. In 1982, Kierno moved to Adelaide, Australia, and played for the Polish diaspora club Polonia Adelaide. After his playing career, Kierno stayed in Australia.

== Honours ==
Gwardia Warsaw

- II liga North: 1977–98
