= Marek Ługowski =

Polish footballer

Personal information
- Full name: Marek Wiesław Ługowski
- Date of birth: 8 May 1964 (age 62)
- Place of birth: Starogard Gdański, Poland
- Height: 1.78 m (5 ft 10 in)
- Position: Defender

Senior career*
Years	Team	Apps	(Gls)
- Włókniarz Starogard Gdański
–1985	Wierzyca Starogard Gdański		
1985–1994	Lechia Gdańsk	258	(13)
1994–?	CfB Ford Köln Niehl eV		

International career
1987	Poland	2	(0)
- * Club domestic league appearances and goals

Marek Ługowski (born 8 May 1964) is a Polish former professional footballer who played as a defender.

== Football ==
He started his career with his local club Włókniarz Starogard Gdański, before moving across town to play for Wierzyca Starogard Gdański. In 1985 Ługowski joined Lechia Gdańsk spending 9 seasons with the club, playing 273 games and scoring 14 goals for the club. He currently features joint fifth on the list for all time appearance makers for Lechia. After his time with Lechia he moved to German club CfB Ford Köln Niehl eV.

During his career Ługowski played twice for Poland, with both games coming in 1987. He made his debut against Norway with the other cap coming against Romania.
