= Aleksander Cybulski =

Polish footballer

Personal information
- Full name: Aleksander Cybulski
- Date of birth: 30 July 1962 (age 64)
- Place of birth: Gdynia, Poland
- Height: 1.79 m (5 ft 10 in)
- Positions: Defender; midfielder

Youth career
- –1980: Bałtyk Gdynia

Senior career*
Years	Team	Apps	(Gls)
1980–1982	Bałtyk Gdynia	39	(2)
1982–1983	Stoczniowiec Gdańsk		
1983–1990	Lechia Gdańsk	176	(9)
1990–1992	Hudiksvalls FF		
1992–1993	Lechia Gdańsk	18	(0)
1993–1994	CS Jemappes		
1994–1995	Pomezania Malbork	27	(1)
1995–1997	Bałtyk Gdynia	52	(3)
1998	Wierzyca Starogard Gdański		
1998–2000	Bałtyk Gdynia	51	(4)
2000–2005	Cartusia Kartuzy		
2006–2009	Orzeł Trąbki Wielkie		
2009–2012	KS Chwaszczyno	8	(0)
2013–2018	Spójnia Sadlinki	83	(10)
2019–2020	GKS Kowale II	7	(1)
2021	Spójnia Sadlinki	18	(3)

Managerial career
- 2009–2015: KS Chwaszczyno
- 2015–2016: Cartusia Kartuzy
- 2017–2019: Sztorm Mosty
- * Club domestic league appearances and goals

Aleksander Cybulski (born 30 July 1962) is a Polish former professional footballer who has had a playing career that lasted over 40 years since his debut in 1980.

His career highlights include six seasons in the I liga making 131 appearances in the Polish top division with Bałtyk Gdynia and Lechia Gdańsk. Other than short spells in Sweden and Belgium, his entire playing career in Poland has been with clubs in the Pomeranian region of Poland. He has played for 10 different Pomeranian football teams and is known to have made over 100 appearances for Bałtyk Gdynia and over 200 appearances for Lechia Gdańsk. In the later years of his career, and despite still playing regularly, he held coaching roles with three clubs in the lower Polish leagues between 2009 and 2019, most recently being the head coach of Sztorm Mosty.

== Career ==
=== Playing career ===
Cybulski started his career with in the youth levels of his local team Bałtyk Gdynia, making his debut against Lechia Gdańsk on 24 March 1980. In his first season with Bałtyk he played 5 times as the team won promotion to the I liga. In his first spell with Bałtyk he made 39 appearances scoring two goals. Cybulski then spent a season with Stoczniowiec Gdańsk before joining Lechia Gdańsk the season after. His debut for Lechia came in the Polish Super Cup which the team won by beating Lech Poznań 1–0. That season Cybulski also made 26 appearances scoring two goals as Lechia won the II liga, and played in Lechia's first ever European game in the UEFA Cup Winners' Cup against Juventus. The next four seasons Lechia played in the top division of Poland, with Cybulski making a total of 97 appearances in the I liga. Lechia were relegated at the end of the 1987–88 season to the II liga, with Cybulski leaving the club two seasons later. In his first spell with Lechia he played a total 176 league appearances for Lechia contributing 9 goals for the team. He then spent two seasons in Sweden with Hudiksvalls FF returning to Lechia Gdańsk for a season in 1992 making a further 18 league appearances. In total for Lechia Gdańsk Cybulski made 211 appearances and scored 9 goals. He then had a season in Belgium with CS Jemappes, returning to Poland the season after joining Pomezania Malbork. He played with Pomezania in the 1994–95 season with the club finishing 9th in the II liga, the club's highest ever league finish. After that historic season for Pomezania he returned to Bałtyk Gdynia, making a further 103 appearances over the next 5 seasons with Bałtyk, with a short 6-month spell at Wierzyca Starogard Gdański in the middle of that 5 season spell. In total at Bałtyk Gdynia he made 142 league appearances scoring 9 times for the club. Cybulski spent the next five seasons with Cartusia Kartuzy in the fourth tier, helping the club to win promotion to the III liga in his final season. He then spent time with Orzeł Trąbki Wielkie, KS Chwaszczyno, Spójnia Sadlinki, and GKS Kowale. After an 18-month period with GKS Kowale which was interrupted due to the COVID-19 pandemic, Cybulski returned to Spójnia Sadlinki with whom he played for before playing with GKS Kowale.

=== Coaching career ===
From 2009 until 2015 Cybulski was the head coach of KS Chwaszczyno taking the club from the sixth tier to the fourth tier. For the 2015–16 season he was in charge of Cartusia Kartuzy, being dismissed from his contract at the end of the season. In 2017 he became the manager of Sztorm Mosty.

== Stats ==
Appearances and goals by club, season and competition
Club	Season	Division	League		Polish Cup		Other		Total	
Club	Season	Division	Apps	Goals	Apps	Goals	Apps	Goals	Apps	Goals
Bałtyk Gdynia	1979–80	II liga	5	0	—		—		5	0
Bałtyk Gdynia	1980–81	I liga	11	1	2	0	—		13	1
Bałtyk Gdynia	1981–82	I liga	23	1	1	0	—		24	1
Bałtyk Gdynia	Total		39	2	3	0	—		42	2
Stoczniowiec Gdańsk	1982–83	III liga (group 3)	stats unknown							
Lechia Gdańsk	1983–84	II liga (western group)	26	2	1	0	1	0	28	2
Lechia Gdańsk	1984–85	I liga	29	4	1	0	—		30	4
Lechia Gdańsk	1985–86	I liga	21	0	5	0	—		26	0
Lechia Gdańsk	1986–87	I liga	18	1	1	0	2	0	21	1
Lechia Gdańsk	1987–88	I liga	29	1	1	0	2	0	32	1
Lechia Gdańsk	1988–89	II liga (western group)	25	0	1	0	2	0	28	0
Lechia Gdańsk	1989–90	II liga	28	1	—		—		28	1
Lechia Gdańsk	Total		176	9	10	0	7	0	193	9

== Honours ==
Bałtyk Gdynia

- II liga: 1979–80

Lechia Gdańsk

- II liga: 1983–84
- Polish Super Cup: 1983
