= Sargis Khachatryan =

Polish footballer

Personal information
- Full name: Sargis Khachatryan
- Date of birth: 23 October 1964 (age 62)
- Place of birth: Armenia
- Height: 1.75 m (5 ft 9 in)
- Position: Forward

Senior career*
Years	Team	Apps	(Gls)
1993	Lechia Gdańsk	12	(0)
- * Club domestic league appearances and goals

Sargis Khachatryan (Armenian: Սարգիս Խաչատրյան; born 23 October 1964) sometimes also listed as Sarkiz Khachaterian, is an Armenian former Armenian footballer who played as a forward. He was documented to have spent a few months with Lechia Gdańsk making his debut against Sokół Pniewy on 13 May 1993. He made a total of 12 appearances in the II liga during the 1992–93 and 1993–94 season. He scored one goal for Lechia, coming in the Polish Cup. When he made his debut, Khachatryan was the first player not from Poland to play for Lechia Gdańsk.
