= Kupcewicz =

Kupcewicz is Polish surname that can refer to the following people:

- Aleksander Kupcewicz, Polish footballer, father of Aleksander and Zbigniew
- Janusz Kupcewicz, Polish footballer, son of Aleksander and brother of Zbigniew
- Zbigniew Kupcewicz, Polish footballer, son of Aleksander and brother of Janusz
