= 2012–13 Legia Warsaw (men's ice hockey) season =

HUKS Legia Warsaw's 2012–13 season

The HUKS Legia Warsaw ice hockey team competed in the Polish 1. Liga during the 2012–2013 season under the traditional name Legia Warsaw. This marked their 10th season in the league and their 8th consecutive one.

In the 2012–13 regular season, HUKS Legia Warsaw finished fourth, qualifying for the playoffs to compete for the 1. Liga championship and a chance to advance to the Polska Hokej Liga. Over 24 matches, the team, nicknamed "Wojskowi" ("The Military"), secured 11 victories in regulation time and one in overtime, while losing 11 games in regulation and one in overtime, accumulating 36 points. They scored 79 goals and conceded 105, resulting in a goal difference of -26.

The team's leading scorer was Tomasz Wołkowicz with 12 goals, followed closely by Karol Wąsiński with 11. The team did not participate in the 2012–13 Polish Cup.

== Pre-season ==
In June 2012, head coach Zbigniew Stajak resigned to become General Secretary of the Polish Ice Hockey Federation. On 10 August 2012, the club's board met with players to address financial challenges and appoint a new coach, Jacek Szopiński, formerly of Podhale Nowy Targ. Pre-season training began on 14 August 2012, led by physical trainer Paweł Krajczyński.

The club's budget, estimated at 100,000 PLN, was lower than the previous season, threatening their participation. Financial difficulties prompted club president Piotr Demiańczuk to request the withdrawal of UHKS Mazowsze Legia Warsaw from the 1. Liga on 20 August. In response, Polish Ice Hockey Federation president Piotr Hałasik wrote an open letter to Warsaw mayor Hanna Gronkiewicz-Waltz, urging support for the team, which upholds the legacy of Legia Warsaw, a 13-time Polish champion.

In September 2012, the club underwent organizational changes, renaming itself HUKS Legia Warsaw. Michał Wąsiński, father of players Karol and Patryk, was appointed sports director. An agreement with ITI Group allowed the continued use of the Legia name, and a deal with city authorities covered rink rental costs, enabling the team to register for the 1. Liga. The first on-ice training session took place on 17 September 2012, led by new coach Lubomir Witoszek, with 33 players participating. The team trained four times a week, using the rink courtesy of UHKS Mazowsze.

In January 2013, the club unveiled a new logo, incorporating the previous crest into a black-and-white circular emblem, with crossed hockey sticks at the bottom and 13 stars on the sides, symbolizing their championship titles.

== Budget ==
Lacking a primary sponsor, HUKS Legia Warsaw secured several sponsorship deals. On 8 August 2012, they partnered with ALL-House, a Warsaw-based renovation company. Another deal was signed with ARAS Arkadiusz Szaniawski, a construction firm. In January 2013, the club collaborated with Testa Communications, a marketing and PR agency, and WPC, a distributor of Pilot pens. The club also sought city funding, applying for 91,000 PLN for 2012 and 680,000 PLN for 2013 through Warsaw's Sports and Recreation Office, but the application was rejected on formal grounds.

Single-match tickets cost 10 PLN, while season tickets for home games were priced at 100 PLN. The club raised additional funds by selling merchandise, including jerseys, hoodies, and pucks. Before a football derby against Polonia Warszawa, Legia fans collected 6,620 PLN for the hockey and basketball sections, which was used to purchase equipment. Legia Warsaw footballer Jakub Rzeźniczak supported the hockey team by donating a signed team jersey for auction. The website Legia.net provided media patronage.

== Transfers ==
Per league regulations, 1. Liga clubs could make transfers until 31 January 2013. Before the season, top scorers from the previous year, Mateusz Bepierszcz and Filip Komorski, were loaned to GKS Katowice, a Polska Hokej Liga newcomer. Other departures included Łukasz Blot to Naprzód Janów, Krzysztof Gutkowski to SMS PZHL Sosnowiec, Norbert Karamuz, Tomasz Grunwald (retired due to health issues), Mateusz Wiśniewski (returned to Toruń), and Krzysztof Rostkowski. Coach Zbigniew Stajak also left.

The team was bolstered by former Legia players, some resuming their careers: Gabriel Połącarz, Paweł Popielarz, Maciej Maryniak, Marcin Pawłowski, Tomasz Pawłowski, Adrian Maciejko, Bartosz Pióro, Jakub Kosobucki, Aleksander Holszański, and Tomasz Rostkowski. New additions included Tomasz Wołkowicz, Mateusz Solon, Maciej Młynarczyk, Mariusz Szaniawski, Mateusz Jendrasik, Ryszard Zdunek, and Belarusian player Ilja Weczer. Czech coach Lubomir Witoszek was appointed.

After the sixth round, defenceman Michał Porębski joined from KH Energa Toruń, which had withdrawn from the league. He played 13 games for Nesta without scoring. On 26 October 2012, national team goalkeeper Krzysztof Zborowski signed, having previously played for TH Unia Oświęcim. In February 2013, before a playoff series against Polonia Bytom, Legia loaned Jakub Serwiński, Filip Pesta, and Oskar Lehmann from Hockey Club Gdańsk until the season's end.

== Exhibition games ==
On 16 December 2012, Legia played an exhibition game against HC Bohumin, a Czech team from the Moravian-Silesian regional league, to prepare for the second half of the season. Safety concerns arose due to threats from fans of the Czech football club FC Baník Ostrava, but the match proceeded in Bohumin, with the hosts winning 6–3.

== Home arena ==
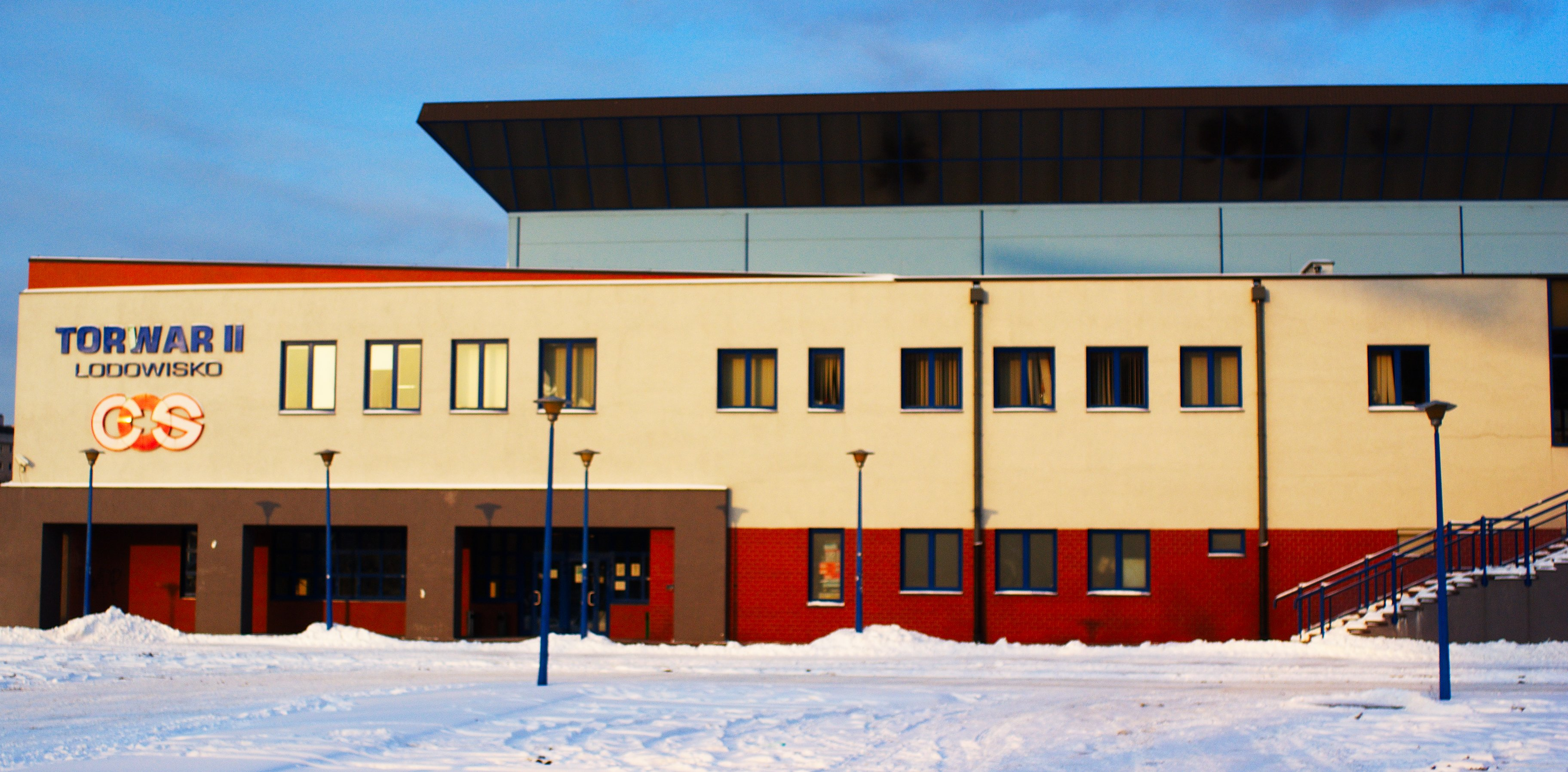
Arena COS Torwar ice rink

HUKS Legia Warsaw played home games at the Arena COS Torwar ice rink, which meets International Ice Hockey Federation standards. The facility seats 640 spectators on plastic chairs and features a 60-by-30-metre ice surface. Due to high organizational costs in the 2012–13 season, attendance was capped at 299 to avoid mass event regulations. From 8 December 2012, after a game against SMS Sosnowiec, the club received approval to host mass events, lifting the attendance limit. The rink also hosts figure skating, curling, and amateur hockey.

== Team roster ==
The 2012–13 roster comprised 36 players.

Team roster
No.	Player	Birth date	Height/Weight	Previous club
Goalkeepers
29	(Poland) Krzysztof Zborowski	22 May 1985	184 cm / 82 kg	(Poland) TH Unia Oświęcim
31	(Poland) Michał Strąk	17 January 1988	180 cm / 75 kg	Homegrown
39	(Poland) Kamil Janiszek	5 January 1991	184 cm / 83 kg	Homegrown
1	(Poland) Aleksander Holszański	25 January 1993	173 cm / 50 kg	Homegrown
Defencemen
77	(Poland) Jarosław Grzesik	4 February 1984	177 cm / 77 kg	(Poland) STS Sanok
8	(Poland) Maciej Maryniak	7 March 1986	182 cm / 81 kg	No club
20	(Poland) Maciej Młynarczyk	28 September 1986	188 cm / 90 kg	(Poland) Stoczniowiec Gdańsk
12	(Poland) Damian Kran	24 September 1992	195 cm / 93 kg	Homegrown
14	(Poland) Marcin Pawłowski	3 November 1983	180 cm / 78 kg	Homegrown
82	(Poland) Tomasz Pawłowski	12 May 1982	185 cm / 85 kg	Homegrown
?	(Poland) Bartosz Pióro	4 March 1987	177 cm / 83 kg	No club
23	(Poland) Gabriel Połącarz	24 July 1986	179 cm / 74 kg	Homegrown
44	(Poland) Paweł Popielarz	18 December 1985	? cm / ? kg	No club
80	(Poland) Michał Porębski	15 April 1989	177 cm / 79 kg	(Poland) KH Energa Toruń
71	(Poland) Patryk Pronobis	11 January 1990	174 cm / 70 kg	(Poland) KH Energa Toruń
19	(Poland) Rafał Solon	26 November 1986	187 cm / 85 kg	(Poland) STS Sanok
7	(Poland) Maciej Stępski	2 February 1990	176 cm / 74 kg	Homegrown
21	(Poland) Mariusz Szaniawski	1 June 1991	181 cm / 74 kg	Homegrown
9	(Poland) Karol Szaniawski	1 December 1993	187 cm / 78 kg	Homegrown
28	(Poland) Mateusz Wardecki (C)	24 October 1988	184 cm / 88 kg	Homegrown
75	(Poland) Aleksander Wolski	17 November 1994	? cm / ? kg	Homegrown
1	(Poland) Oskar Lehmann	21 June 1992	176 cm / 73 kg	(Poland) Hockey Club Gdańsk
Forwards
21	(Poland) Mateusz Jendrasik	1993	? cm / ? kg	Homegrown
10	(Poland) Jakub Kosobucki	11 May 1986	183 cm / 81 kg	No club
51	(Poland) Adrian Maciejko	18 March 1987	180 cm / 77 kg	(Poland) TMH Polonia Bytom
?	(Poland) Tomasz Rostkowski	17 February 1988	182 cm / 73 kg	Homegrown
73	(Poland) Grzegorz Rostkowski	27 June 1989	180 cm / 72 kg	Homegrown
17	(Poland) Mateusz Solon	19 April 1990	172 cm / 73 kg	(Poland) TMH Polonia Bytom
13	(Poland) Bryan Świderski	18 March 1994	? cm / ? kg	(Poland) SMS PZHL Sosnowiec
87	(Belarus) Ilja Weczer	18 April 1990	188 cm / 93 kg	(Belarus) HK Brest
18	(Poland) Patryk Wąsiński	29 August 1990	177 cm / 75 kg	(Poland) TMH Polonia Bytom
95	(Poland) Karol Wąsiński	19 January 1995	171 cm / 65 kg	(Poland) TMH Polonia Bytom
11	(Poland) Tomasz Wołkowicz	9 August 1979	185 cm / 86 kg	(Poland) Naprzód Janów
22	(Poland) Ryszard Zdunek	31 March 1976	176 cm / 72 kg	(Poland) TMH Polonia Bytom
21	(Poland) Jakub Serwiński	6 January 1992	180 cm / 79 kg	(Poland) Hockey Club Gdańsk
99	(Poland) Filip Pesta	9 October 1993	184 cm / 81 kg	(Poland) Hockey Club Gdańsk
Coaching staff
N/A	(Czech Republic) Lubomir Witoszek	23 December 1972		Head coach
N/A	(Poland) Robert Tchórzewski	21 June 1966		Assistant coach

== Representation ==
Coaches Andrei Parfionov and Jarosław Morawiecki selected 28 players for the Poland men's national under-20 ice hockey team training camp held in Sanok from 5 to 10 November 2012. Legia Warsaw's Karol Szaniawski was included in the roster, while teammate Bryan Świderski was named to the reserve list. On 9 November, the team played a friendly match against Ukraine U20 in Sanok.

Szaniawski and Świderski were also called up for a second training camp, where the team played three friendly matches to prepare for the IIHF World Junior Championship Division I Group B. Szaniawski participated in the championship, where Poland won the tournament and earned promotion to Division I Group A.

No.	Player	Team	Date	Match	Type	Goals	Assists
1	Karol Szaniawski	Poland U20	9 November 2012	(Poland) 2:1 (Ukraine)	Friendly	0	0
2	Karol Szaniawski	Poland U20	3 December 2012	(Poland) 2:1 (Czech Republic)	Friendly	0	0
3	Karol Szaniawski	Poland U20	5 December 2012	(Poland) 2:3 (Austria)	Friendly	0	0
4	Karol Szaniawski	Poland U20	6 December 2012	(Poland) 4:3 (Austria)	Friendly	0	0
5	Karol Szaniawski	Poland U20	10 December 2012	(Poland) 6:3 (Kazakhstan)	World Junior Championship Div. I Group B	0	0
6	Karol Szaniawski	Poland U20	12 December 2012	(Poland) 6:2 (United Kingdom)	World Junior Championship Div. I Group B	0	1
7	Karol Szaniawski	Poland U20	13 December 2012	(Poland) 0:2 (Ukraine)	World Junior Championship Div. I Group B	0	0
8	Karol Szaniawski	Poland U20	15 December 2012	(Poland) 5:0 (Croatia)	World Junior Championship Div. I Group B	0	0
9	Karol Szaniawski	Poland U20	16 December 2012	(Poland) 3:2 (Italy)	World Junior Championship Div. I Group B	0	0

Legia Warsaw forward Karol Wąsiński was called up to the Poland men's national under-18 ice hockey team, coached by Tomasz Demkowicz and Ireneusz Jarosz. The team played a two-match series against Austria U18 on 9–10 November 2012. Wąsiński was also selected for a second camp in Meribel, France, from 13 to 15 December 2012, where Poland played three friendly matches, though Wąsiński did not participate in any games. Another training camp took place in Cieszyn from 4 to 8 February 2013, where Poland played two friendly matches against Czech teams AZ Havířov and HC Vítkovice Ridera. Wąsiński scored a goal against Havířov. Before the World Championship, Poland played three friendly matches against HC RT Torax Poruba's junior team. Wąsiński appeared in two games, recording one assist.

No.	Player	Team	Date	Match	Type	Goals	Assists
1	Karol Wąsiński	Poland U18	10 November 2012	(Poland) 6:6 (Austria)	Friendly	0	0
2	Karol Wąsiński	Poland U18	7 February 2013	(Czech Republic) 5:7 (Poland)	Friendly	1	0
3	Karol Wąsiński	Poland U18	8 February 2013	(Czech Republic) 2:4 (Poland)	Friendly	0	0
4	Karol Wąsiński	Poland U18	5 April 2013	(Czech Republic) 3:7 (Poland)	Friendly	0	1
5	Karol Wąsiński	Poland U18	5 April 2013	(Czech Republic) 8:9 (SO) (Poland)	Friendly	0	0

== Regular season ==
The 2012–2013 Polish 1. Liga season consisted of a two-stage format: a regular season followed by a play-off round. Teams played two rounds of 14 matches each during the regular season, with each team facing every opponent twice (Saturday and Sunday games). The regular season concluded on 24 February 2013. The top four teams advanced to the playoffs to compete for promotion to the Ekstraliga. In the semi-finals (best-of-three series), the first-placed team faced the fourth, and the second faced the third. Semi-final winners advanced to the final, played as a best-of-five series.

Legia Warsaw opened the season against Orlik Opole. In the first match, Legia led 1:0 after the first period with a goal from Jakub Kosobucki. Orlik equalized early in the second period through Nalewajka, but Legia regained the lead with a shorthanded goal by Karol Wąsiński. However, Legia tired after only eight pre-season ice practices, allowing Orlik to score three goals and win 5:2. In the second game, Legia won 4:3. Tomasz Pawłowski scored a shorthanded goal late in the first period. Orlik took a 2:1 lead in the second with goals from Stopiński and Sznotała. In the third period, Legia mounted a comeback with goals from Patryk Wąsiński, Karol Wąsiński, and Karol Szaniawski, while Wilusz sealed the win for Orlik 50 seconds before the end.

In the third round, Legia faced Hockey Club Gdańsk away. Coach Witoszek was without several players: A. Maciejko, M. Solon, M. Młynarczyk, B. Bióro, and brothers Marcin and Tomasz Pawłowski. In the first game, Legia won 6:5. Szaniawski scored early, but Gdańsk led 3:2 after the first period with goals from Strużyk, Lehmann, and Serwiński; Kosobucki scored for Legia. Strużyk extended Gdańsk's lead to 4:2 in the second. In the third, Legia rallied with four goals from Grzegorz Rostkowski (two), Karol Wąsiński, and Szaniawski, while Gdańsk's Ziółkowski scored once. Rostkowski's second goal, scored 30 seconds from the end, secured the win. In the second game, Gdańsk dominated with a 4:0 shutout, scoring one goal in the first period, two in the second, and one in the third. Gdańsk's goalkeepers, particularly Arnold Szymczewski, were key to the victory.

In the fifth round, Legia defeated Naprzód Janów 5:4 at home after a shootout. Naprzód led 3:1 after two periods, with Legia's only goal from defender Damian Kran. In the third, Legia tied the game with goals from Patryk and Karol Wąsiński, and Mateusz Solon scored to take a 4:3 lead. Naprzód equalized late through Cinalski during a 6-on-3 power play. No goals were scored in overtime, but Legia won the shootout with goals from Tomasz Wołkowicz and Patryk Wąsiński. Legia debuted new jerseys for this match. Before the game, the club honored the late Paweł Piekarzewski, former team manager and father of former player Filip Komorski, by hanging a jersey with his name and number 5 behind one of the goals. The next day, Legia again defeated Naprzód 5:4. The first period ended 1:1 with a goal from Patryk Wąsiński. In the second, Mateusz Solon gave Legia the lead, but Naprzód equalized. In the third, Naprzód took a two-goal lead, but Legia tied the game with goals from Wołkowicz and Grzegorz Rostkowski. Solon scored the game-winner 40 seconds before the end.

Legia faced league leader MMKS Podhale Nowy Targ away in the third road series, with the first game broadcast online via Podhale's official website. Coach Witoszek was without Tomasz Pawłowski, Ilja Weczer, Paweł Popielarz, and Tomasz Wołkowicz. Podhale took an early lead and, despite strong goalkeeping from Legia's Michał Strąk, won 7:0 with three goals in each of the final two periods. In the second game, Podhale won 6:1, scoring two goals in each of the first two periods and two in the third. Szaniawski scored Legia's lone goal, assisted by Patryk Wąsiński.

Against Polonia Bytom, Legia was without Mateusz Jendrasik, Gabriel Połącarz, and Mariusz Szaniawski due to injuries. Defender Damian Kran was suspended for three games and fined 700 PLN by the Polish Ice Hockey Federation following the Podhale match. In the first game, Polonia led 2:0, but Legia tied it with goals from Patryk Wąsiński and Tomasz Wołkowicz. The second period saw both teams score twice, with Wołkowicz and Paweł Popielarz scoring for Legia. In the third, Jakub Kosobucki gave Legia the lead, but Polonia scored three goals to win 8:5. In the second game, Polonia won 6:1. The first period was scoreless, but Polonia scored three times in the second, with Legia's only goal from Ryszard Zdunek. Polonia added three more in the third.

In the final series of the first round, Legia faced SMS Sosnowiec. On Saturday, Legia won 6:1. The first period ended 1:1 with a goal from Rafał Solon. In the second, Legia scored three times through Patryk Wąsiński and Tomasz Wołkowicz (two). Ryszard Zdunek and Jarosław Grzesik added goals in the third. On Sunday, Legia won 7:3. The first period ended 4:1 with goals from Karol Wąsiński, Brayan Świderski, Michał Porębski, and Patryk Wąsiński. SMS won the second period 2:1, with Zdunek scoring for Legia. Legia sealed the game in the third with goals from Grzegorz Rostkowski and Rafał Solon.

Legia began the second round with a 5:2 loss to Orlik Opole away, with goals from Ryszard Zdunek and Tomasz Wołkowicz. In the Sunday game, Legia won 4:2 with two goals from Zdunek and one each from Karol Wąsiński and Mateusz Solon. In the third round, Legia hosted Hockey Club Gdańsk, winning 4:3 on Saturday with two goals each from Karol Wąsiński and Tomasz Wołkowicz. The match marked the debut of the logo of new sponsor Pilot on jerseys and rink boards. On Sunday, Legia won 4:1 with two goals from Karol Szaniawski and one each from Mateusz Wardecki and Wołkowicz.

In rounds 19 and 20, Legia faced Naprzód Janów away, losing both games. Naprzód won the first 9:2, scoring three goals in the first period and five in the second. Legia's goals came from Wołkowicz and Patryk Wąsiński. The second game ended 7:3, with Naprzód winning the first two periods 2:1 and the third 3:1. Legia's goals were scored by Karol Szaniawski, Damian Kran, and Karol Wąsiński. Legia hosted league leader Podhale Nowy Targ in the next two rounds. Podhale won the first game 7:1, with Adrian Maciejko scoring Legia's only goal, assisted by Jarosław Grzesik. In the second game, Legia upset Podhale 4:2, marking Podhale's first regulation loss of the season. Goals came from Ilja Weczer, Grzegorz Rostkowski, Karol Wąsiński, and Patryk Wąsiński. This victory propelled Legia to fourth place, securing a play-off spot.

Against second-placed Polonia Bytom, Polonia won the first game 4:3 in overtime. The game was tied 3:3 after regulation, with Legia's goals from Grzegorz Rostkowski, Karol Wąsiński, and Patryk Wąsiński. Filip Stoklasa scored the overtime winner for Polonia. In the second game, Polonia won 7:3 with Legia's goals from Gabriel Połącarz, Patryk Wąsiński, and Ryszard Zdunek. These losses dropped Legia to fifth place, making the final series against SMS Sosnowiec crucial for playoff qualification.

In the final regular-season series, Legia needed a sweep against SMS Sosnowiec to secure a play-off spot. On Saturday, Legia won 4:1 with goals from Jakub Serwiński, Karol Szaniawski, Mateusz Solon, and Rafał Solon. On Sunday, Legia won 3:1 with goals from Serwiński, Szaniawski, and Wołkowicz, clinching a play-off berth.

Pos.	Team	Games played	Points	Wins	Overtime/Shootout wins	Overtime/Shootout losses	Losses	Goals for	Goals against	Goal differential
1	Podhale Nowy Targ	24	67	22	0	1	1	156	27	+129
2	TMH Polonia Bytom	24	50	15	2	1	6	107	70	+37
3	Naprzód Janów	24	39	11	2	2	9	124	69	+55
4	Legia Warszawa	24	36	11	1	1	11	79	105	-26
5	Orlik Opole	24	33	11	0	0	13	66	83	-17
6	Hockey Club Gdańsk	24	16	5	0	1	18	52	135	-83
7	SMS PZHL Sosnowiec	24	11	3	1	0	20	30	125	-95

=== Playoff round ===
After the end of the regular season, Legia Warsaw finished in fourth place in the 1. Liga standings. This position qualified them to participate in the playoff phase, with the winner earning promotion to the Ekstraliga. Their opponent in the semifinals was Podhale Nowy Targ, the winner of the regular season. The series was played in a best-of-three format. The first game was held in Nowy Targ, where Podhale confidently defeated Legia 5–0. In the return match in Warsaw, Podhale again proved stronger, winning the game 3–0. The opponents scored one goal in each period and advanced to the final.

== See also ==
- Legia Warsaw (ice hockey)
