= Sport in Gdańsk =

There are many popular professional sports team in the Gdańsk and Tricity area. Amateur sports are played by thousands of Gdańsk citizens and also in schools of all levels (elementary, secondary, university).

== Sports in Gdańsk ==
=== Football ===
Current teams

- Lechia Gdańsk — men's football team (Polish Cup winner 1983 & 2019, Polish Super Cup winner 1983 & 2019; plays in the Ekstraklasa, formed in 1945)
- Gedania 1922 Gdańsk — men's football team (the reactivated club for Gedania Danzig, formed in 1945)
- SKS Stoczniowiec Gdańsk — men's football team (Polish Cup semi-finalists in 1975–76, formed in 1945)
- Portowiec Gdańsk — men's football team (formed in 1957)
- KP Jaguar Gdańsk — men's football team (formed in 2001)
- AP Orlen Gdańsk — women's football team (plays in the Ekstraliga, formed in 2014)
- Lechia Gdańsk Ladies — women's football team (formed in 2016)

Former teams

- BuEV Danzig — men's football team (played from 1903 to 1945)
- Flotylla Gdańsk — men's football team (played from 2001 to 2003)
- Gedania Danzig — men's football team (became Gedania 1922 Gdańsk in 1945, played from 1922 to 1939)
- Lechia-Polonia Gdańsk — men's football team (created by a merger between Lechia Gdańsk and SKS Stoczniowiec Gdańsk, then known as "Polonia Gdańsk", played from 1998 to 2002)
- MOSiR Gdańsk — men's football team (merged with Gedania 1922 Gdańsk, played until 1987)
- Olimpia-Lechia Gdańsk — men's football team (created by a merger between Lechia Gdańsk and Olimpia Poznań, played from 1995 to 1996)
- Ostmark Danzig — men's football team (played from 1909 to 1945)
- Post SG Danzig — men's football team (team for the cities postal workers, played until 1945)
- Preußen Danzig — men's football team (played from 1909 to 1945)
- SG OrPo Danzig — men's football team (played from 1920 to 1945)

=== Rugby ===
- RC Lechia Gdańsk — men's rugby union team (13x Polish Champions, 12x Polish Cup winners, formed in 1956)
- AZS-AWFiS Gdańsk — men's rugby union team (1x Polish Cup winners, played in the Ekstrliga from 1998 to 2005, formed in 1988)
- RC Lechia Gdańsk 7's — men's rugby sevens team (8x Rugby 7's Polish Champions, formed in 1996)
- Biało-Zielone Ladies Gdańsk — women's rugby sevens team (13x Rugby 7's Polish Champions, formed in 2009)

==== Former teams ====
- RC AZS Politechnika Gdańsk — men's Rugby team (Polish Championship runners-up in 1958, played from 1956 to 1961)

=== Handball ===
Current teams

- Wybrzeże Gdańsk — men's handball team (10x Polish Superliga champions, formed in 1951)

Former teams

- AZS-AWFiS Gdańsk — men's handball team (played in the Superliga in 2003–06, 2007–10, dissolved in 2010)
- Nata AZS-AWFiS Gdańsk — women's handball (Polish Champions in 2003–04, dissolved in 2017)
- SMS ZPRP Gdańsk — men's handball team (played in the I liga team, played from 1997 to 2021)

=== Speedway ===
- Wybrzeże Gdańsk — speedway team (formed in 1945)

=== Volleyball ===
- Gedania Gdańsk — women's volleyball team (3x Polish Champions, now focuses on its youth teams, formed in 1922)
- Trefl Gdańsk — men's volleyball team (2x Polish Cup winners, Polish SuperCup winners, formed in 2005)

=== Basketball ===
==== Former teams ====
- Wybrzeże Gdańsk — men's basketball team (4x Basket Liga champions, played from 1946 to 1996)

=== Ice Hockey ===
Current teams

- Stoczniowiec Gdańsk — men's ice hockey team (played from 1953 to 2012, 2014–2021, 2021–)

Former teams

- Hockey Club Gdańsk — men's ice hockey team (played from 2012 to 2014)
- Pomeranian Hockey Club 2014 — men's ice hockey team (played in the Ekstraliga between 2016 and 2020, played from 2014 to 2020)

=== Rowing ===
- AZS-AWFiS Gdańsk — Rowing club
- GKW Drakkar Gdańsk — Rowing club (formed in 1974)
- GTW Gedania Gdańsk — Rowing club (formed in 1948)

=== American football ===
Former teams

- Pomorze Seahawks — American football team (3x Polish Bowl winners, later based in Gdynia, played from 2005 to 2019)

=== Sports clubs ===
- Stoczniowiec Gdańsk — sections in football, ice hockey, speed skating, curling, and volleyball
- AZS-AWFiS Gdańsk — sections in handball, fencing, gymnastics, judo, athletics, swimming, rugby, table tennis, rowing, and sailing

former clubs

- Gedania Gdańsk — Sports club (Known historical sections include football, volleyball, rowing, and boxing. Current sporting sections that still use the "Gedania" name are football, volleyball, and rowing. Sports club from 1922 to 1939 & 1945–2006 when the last section became independent)
- Lechia Gdańsk — Sports club (Historically had sections in 18 different sports. Current sporting sections that still use the "Lechia" name are football, rugby, cycling, athletics, and tennis. Sports club from 1945 to 2002 when the sections became independent)

== Sports venues in Gdańsk ==
- Stadion Gdańsk (known as "Polsat Plus Arena Gdańsk" for sponsorship reasons) — football stadium (home stadium for Lechia Gdańsk, hosts selected matches for the Poland national football team, held 4 games during Euro 2012, hosted the 2021 Europa League Final) capacity; 41,620
- Stadion Gdańskiego Ośrodka Sportu (Gdańsk Sports Center Stadium) — football stadium (home stadium for Lechia Gdańsk Ladies, training ground for Lechia Gdańsk) capacity; 12,244
- Ergo Arena — multi-purpose indoor arena, on the boundary between Gdańsk and Sopot (home arena for Trefl Gdańsk, and Trefl Sopot, held 10 games during 2013 Men's European Volleyball Championship, hosted the 2014 IAAF World Indoor Championships, held 15 games during 2014 FIVB Volleyball Men's World Championship, held 6 games during 2016 European Men's Handball Championship, hosted UFC Fight Night 118, holding 3 games during 2023 World Men's Handball Championship), capacity; 11,409
- Stadion Zbigniew Podlecki — speedway stadium (home stadium for Wybrzeże Gdańsk), capacity; 10,000
- Stadion Stoczniowca Gdańsk — football stadium (home stadium for Stoczniowiec Gdańsk, built 1952) capacity; 7,500
- Hala Olivia — multi-purpose indoor arena, primarily used for sports on ice (home stadium for Stoczniowiec Gdańsk, KH Gdańsk, and Pomeranian Hockey Club 2014, held 6 matches during EuroBasket 2009) capacity 5,500
- Gdański Stadion Lekkoatletyczny i Rugby (Gdańsk Athletics and Rugby Stadium) — multi-purpose sports and athletics stadium (home stadium for RC Lechia Gdańsk, Biało-Zielone Ladies Gdańsk, AP Orlen Gdańsk, and KL Lechia Gdańsk) capacity; 924
- Maritime School Football Field — football stadium (home stadium for Portowiec Gdańsk, renovated 2016) capacity; 300

Former venues

- Stadion Tadeusza Kościuszki 49 — football stadium (home stadium for Gedania Danzig & Gedania 1922 Gdańsk, built 1926, closed 2015) capacity; 1000
- Dolina Radości and Dolina Henrietta ski jumping hills – two former ski jumping hills defunct by the 1980s

== Sporting events in Gdańsk ==
(In order of date)

- EuroBasket 2009 (7–20 September 2009) — 36th FIBA European Basketball Championship (Hosted Group B games; 7–9 September 2009)
- UEFA Euro 2012 (8 June – 1 July 2012) — 14th UEFA Men's European Championship (Hosted 3 Group C games, & 1 Quarterfinal game; 10–22 June 2012)
- 2013 European Volleyball Championship (20–29 September 2013) — 28th European Volleyball Championship (Hosted Pool B, Playoff and Quarterfinal games; 20–25 September 2013)
- 2014 IAAF World Indoor Championships (7—9 March 2014) — 15th IAAF Indoor Track & Field Championships (Hosted whole Championship; 7—9 March 2014)
- 2014 FIVB Volleyball World Championship (30 August – 21 September 2014) — 18th FIVB Volleyball World Championship (Hosted Pool C games; 1–7 September 2014)
- 2016 European Handball Championship (15–31 January 2016) — 12th European Men's Handball Championship (Hosted Group D games; 16–20 January 2016)
- 2021 UEFA Europa League Final (26 May 2021) — 12th UEFA Europa League final (Hosted final; Villarreal vs Manchester United)
- 2023 World Handball Championship (11–29 January 2023) — 28th IHF World Men's Handball Championship (Hosting 2 Quarterfinal & 1 Semifinal games; 25—27 January 2023)

== See also ==
- Gdańsk Derby
- Sports in Tricity
