= List of Lechia Gdańsk seasons =

This is a list of seasons played by Lechia Gdańsk in Polish and European football, from 1945 (the year of the club's foundation) to the most recent completed season.

The club has won the Polish Cup twice, the Polish Super Cup twice, and has a highest ever league finish of third in the Ekstraklasa. This list details the club's achievements in all major competitions, and those players who were the leagues top scorers.

Season	Division		Position	Polish Cup	Comments	
1945/46	III	District league Gdańsk qualifiers	1 of 4	Not played	Lechia Gdańsk were formed on 7 August 1945	
1945/46	III	District league Gdańsk qualifiers	1 of 4	Not played	First Gdańsk Derby between Lechia and Gedania Gdańsk	
1946/47	II	District league	1	Not played	5th place in the final group of elimination for the 1st league	
1947/48	II	District league	1	Not played	1st place in the final group of elimination for the first league and promotion	The highest ranked club from Pomerania
1949	I	I League	12 of 12	Not played		The highest ranked club from Pomerania
1950	II	II League (West Group)	6 of 10	Not played		
1951	II	II League (Group A)	1 of 8	1st round	Promoted after playoffs	The highest ranked club from Pomerania
1952	I	I League	7 of 10	Quarterfinals	Young Leaders Rally Cup - 6th place	The highest ranked club from Pomerania
1953	I	I League	12 of 12	Not played		The highest ranked club from Pomerania
1954	II	II League	2 of 11	Round of 16		The highest ranked club from Pomerania
1955	I	I League	5 of 12	Runners-up		The highest ranked club from Pomerania
1956	I	I League	3 of 12	Elimination round		The highest ranked club from Pomerania
1957	I	I League	5 of 12	Round of 8		The highest ranked club from Pomerania
1958	I	I League	8 of 12	Not played		The highest ranked club from Pomerania
1959	I	I League	6 of 12	Not played		The highest ranked club from Pomerania
1960	I	I League	9 of 12	Not played		The highest ranked club from Pomerania
1961	I	I League	8 of 12	Not played		The highest ranked club from Pomerania
1962	I	I League	9 of 12	Round of 16		
1962/63	I	I League	13 of 14	Round of 16		
1963/64	II	II League	10 of 16	Round 1		
1964/65	II	II League	7 of 16	Round 2	First Tricity Derby between Lechia and Arka Gdynia	
1965/66	II	II League	6 of 16	Round of 16		
1966/67	II	II League	13 of 16	Round of 8		
1967/68	III	III League (g. IV)	2 of 16	Round 1	First Gdańsk Derby between Lechia and Stoczniowiec Gdańsk	
1968/69	III	III League (g. IV)	5 of 16	-		
1969/70	III	III League (g. IV)	3 of 16	-		
1970/71	III	III League (g. IV)	2 of 16	-		
1971/72	III	III League (g. IV)	1 of 16	-		
1972/73	II	II League	7 of 16	-		
1973/74	II	II League (north)	4 of 16	Round of 8		
1974/75	II	II League (north)	2 of 16	Round of 16		
1975/76	II	II League (north)	2 of 16	Round of 16		
1976/77	II	II League (north)	5 of 16	Round of 16		
1977/78	II	II League (north)	2 of 16	Round 1		
1978/79	II	II League (west)	3 of 16	Quarter finals		
1979/80	II	II League (west)	6 of 16	Round of 8		
1980/81	II	II League (west)	7 of 16	Round of 16		
1981/82	II	II League (west)	14 of 16	Semifinal		
1982/83	III	III League (g. II)	1 of 14	Winners		
1983/84	II	II League (west)	1 of 16	-	Polish Super Cup Winners	
1983/84	II	II League (west)	1 of 16	-	Cup Winners' Cup Round of 16	
1983/84	II	II League (west)	1 of 16	-	Jerzy Kruszczyński - II Liga top goalscorer (31 goals)	
1984/85	I	I League	12 of 16	Round 3		
1985/86	I	I League	14 of 16	Round of 16	Intertoto Cup - 3rd in group	
1986/87	I	I League	11 of 16	Round of 16		
1987/88	I	I League	12 of 16	Round of 8	Relegation after playoffs	
1988/89	II	II League (east)	10 of 11	Round of 16		
1989/90	II	II League	11 of 20	Round 2		The highest ranked club from Pomerania
1990/91	II	II League	12 of 20	Round 3		
1991/92	II	II League (west)	8 of 18	Round 3		
1992/93	II	II League (west)	6 of 18	Round of 16		
1993/94	II	II League (west)	14 of 18	Round 3	First (and currently only) Tricity Derby in the Polish Cup	
1994/95	II	II League (west)	15 of 18	Round 2		
1995/96	I	I League	16 of 18	-	Lechia were involved in a merger with first division Olimpia Poznań creating Olimpia-Lechia Gdańsk	Olimpia left the merger at the end of the season
1995/96	III	III League (g. VII)	12 of 18	Round 3	Olimpia-Lechia played in the top division, while Lechia Gdańsk (used as the club's second team) continued playing in the third division	
1996/97	II	II League (west)	15 of 18	Round of 16	Before the season Olimpia-Lechia were renamed Lechia Gdańsk, with the third division team being liquidated	
1997/98	III	III League (g. II)	3 of 18	Round 2	At the end of the season Lechia merged with Stoczniowiec Gdańsk (then known as Polonia Gdańsk) creating Lechia-Polonia Gdańsk	
1998/99	II	II League (west)	7 of 14	Round of 16		Played under the name of Lechia-Polonia Gdańsk
1999/00	II	II League	14 of 24	Round of 16		Played under the name of Lechia-Polonia Gdańsk
2000/01	II	II League	19 of 20	Round 2	Polish League Cup - Round 3	Played under the name of Lechia-Polonia Gdańsk
2001/02	III	III League (g. 2)	15 of 19	-		Lechia-Polonia dissolved at the end of the season
2001/02	VI	Class A (Gdańsk IV)	1 of 12	-		An independent Lechia Gdańsk team was recreated in the 6th division
2002/03	V	District League (g. II)	1 of 16	-		
2003/04	IV	IV League (Pomerania)	1 of 18	-	Currently Lechia’s last Gdańsk Derby game, it was played against Gedania Gdańsk	
2004/05	III	III League (g. II)	1 of 16	Round 1		
2005/06	II	II League	10 of 18	-		
2006/07	II	II League	5 of 18	Round of 16		
2007/08	II	II League	1 of 18	Quarterfinals		The highest ranked club from Pomerania
2008/09	I	Ekstraklasa	11 of 16	Round of 16	Ekstraklasa Cup - 3rd in group	The highest ranked club from Pomerania
2008/09	I	Ekstraklasa	11 of 16	Round of 16	First Tricity Derby in the top division between Lechia and Arka Gdynia	The highest ranked club from Pomerania
2009/10	I	Ekstraklasa	8 of 18	Semifinal		The highest ranked club from Pomerania
2010/11	I	Ekstraklasa	8 of 16	Semifinal	Last official game at the MOSiR Stadium	The highest ranked club from Pomerania
2011/12	I	Ekstraklasa	13 of 16	Round of 16	First official game at the PGE Arena	The highest ranked club from Pomerania
2012/13	I	Ekstraklasa	8 of 16	Round of 8		The highest ranked club from Pomerania
2013/14	I	Ekstraklasa	4 of 16	Quarterfinals		The highest ranked club from Pomerania
2014/15	I	Ekstraklasa	5 of 16	Round of 16		The highest ranked club from Pomerania
2015/16	I	Ekstraklasa	5 of 16	Round of 8		The highest ranked club from Pomerania
2016/17	I	Ekstraklasa	4 of 16	Round of 8	Marco Paixão - Ekstraklasa top goalscorer (18 goals)	The highest ranked club from Pomerania
2017/18	I	Ekstraklasa	13 of 16	Round of 16		
2018/19	I	Ekstraklasa	3 of 16	Winners		The highest ranked club from Pomerania
2019/20	I	Ekstraklasa	4 of 16	Runners-up	2019 Polish Super Cup winners	The highest ranked club from Pomerania
2019/20	I	Ekstraklasa	4 of 16	Runners-up	2019–20 UEFA Europa League Second qualifying round	The highest ranked club from Pomerania
2020/21	I	Ekstraklasa	7 of 16	Round of 16		The highest ranked club from Pomerania
2021/22	I	Ekstraklasa	4 of 18	Round of 32		The highest ranked club from Pomerania
2022/23	I	Ekstraklasa	17 of 18	Round of 16	2022–23 UEFA Europa Conference League Second qualifying round	The highest ranked club from Pomerania
2023/24	II	I liga	1 of 18	First round		The highest ranked club from Pomerania
2024/25	I	Ekstraklasa	14 of 18	First round		The highest ranked club from Pomerania
2025/26	I	Ekstraklasa	16 of 18	Round of 16		The highest ranked club from Pomerania

== Honours ==
Competition	Symbol	Position	Season	Ref.
Ekstraklasa / I liga (Top division)	Bronze medal	3rd	1956; 2018–19	
Puchar Polski		Winners	1982–83; 2018–19	
Superpuchar Polski	Gold medal	Winners	1983; 2019	
