= Flotylla Gdańsk =

Polish association football team

- Full name: Klub Sportowy Flotylla Gdańsk
- Founded: 3 July 2001; 24 years ago
- Dissolved: July 2003; 22 years ago
- Ground: Stadion MRKS
Home colours	Away colours

KS Flotylla Gdańsk was a football team based in Gdańsk, Poland. Located in the Letnica area of Gdańsk Flotylla used the facilities and stadium of MRKS Gdańsk, who had only just dissolved prior to Flotylla's formation. The club went on to enjoy two successful seasons leading to Flotylla becoming Gdańsk's highest ranking football club. This success saw them being involved in a merger with Gedania, which ultimately led to the club being dissolved. The rise and fall of Flotylla all happened within the space of 24 months.

== History ==
The company for Klub Sportowy Flotylla itself was founded on 3 July 2001, however Flotylla did play its first game in the 2000–01 Pomeranian Polish Cup losing 3–0 to Blyskawica Reda-Rekowo Dolne. The club were part of a league ready for the 2001–02 season, entering the Gdansk District League (group I), and went on to win promotion from the league finishing as champions in the clubs first full season. After securing promotion to the IV liga, Flotylla found themselves as the highest ranking club in the city of Gdańsk, despite the city having teams such as Lechia Gdańsk, Polonia Gdańsk, and Gedania Gdańsk. For the clubs first season in the IV liga they received new sponsorship, being sponsored by the Gdynia-based company Nordcoop. As a result of this title sponsor the club were known for the season as Nordcoop Flotylla Gdańsk, or simply, Nordcoop Gdańsk. Flotylla's second season was almost as successful as their first, with the club finishing as runners-up in the IV liga. At the end of the 2002–03 season Flotylla were involved in a merger with Gedania Gdańsk, with Gedania absorbing Flotylla's players and taking the clubs position in the IV liga, resulting in Flotylla being dissolved as a football club.

== Honours ==
IV Liga

- Runners-up: 2002–03

District League (Gdańsk I)

- Winners: 2001–02

== See also ==
- Gdańsk Derby
- Sport in Gdańsk
