= Zdzisław Puszkarz =

Polish footballer

Personal information
- Date of birth: 18 February 1950 (age 76)
- Place of birth: Gdańsk, Poland
- Height: 1.71 m (5 ft 7 in)
- Position: Midfielder

Youth career
- RKS Stocznia Północna
- 1964–1968: Lechia Gdańsk

Senior career*
Years	Team	Apps	(Gls)
1968–1981	Lechia Gdańsk	295	(55)
1982–1984	Bałtyk Gdynia	67	(10)
1984–1986	Holstein Kiel	54	(13)
1986–1987	MOSiR Gdańsk		
1987–1988	Lechia Gdańsk	33	(2)
Total		449	(80)

International career
1975	Poland	1	(0)

Managerial career
- Lechia Gdańsk (youth)
- 2012–2023: Lechia Gdańsk (ME) (assistant)
- * Club domestic league appearances and goals

Zdzisław Puszkarz (born 18 February 1950) is a Polish former professional footballer who played as a midfielder. He spent the majority of his career playing for football teams in the Tricity area, spending the majority of his career playing for Lechia Gdańsk. Puszkarz earned one cap for Poland, playing against East Germany on 28 May 1975.

== Early years ==
Puszkarz first became interested in football due to his father, Tadeusz Puszkarz, who was known as a huge fan of Lechia Gdańsk. This interest grew stronger when Zdzisław himself started to become interested in Lechia, and was quickly a fan often watching the team at Mosir Stadium. Showcasing his football skills at school, his PE teacher saw his talent and recommended him to RKS Stocznia Północna, a now defunct team in Gdańsk. Puszkarz made a big impact for Stocznia, and after a big win against the Lechia's youth team, Puszkarz was offered the chance to train with the club. Puszkarz spent for years in the Lechia's youth system, he often spent time training with then Lechia captain Roman Korynt.

== Senior career ==
During the 1967–68 season, Puszkarz often played with the youth team, before making his senior debut in a 2–1 defeat to Arkonia Szczecin. Over the next 4 seasons Puszkarz became a regular for Lechia while they played in the third tier. During this period, Puszkarz scored a total of 18 goals, two of these came in the 5–0 win over Czarny Szczecin, the game which secured Lechia's promotion to the second tier of Polish football.

The next 10 years saw Lechia playing in the second tier, finishing three of those seasons as runners-up, and narrowly missing out on promotion to Ekstraklasa. During this time Puszkarz contributed 33 goals for the team in their continual bid for promotion. Despite Lechia playing in the second tier, Puszkarz was called up to the Poland squad in 1975 to play against East Germany. In his only game for Poland, the team won 2–1, with Puszkarz coming of on the 46th minute with the scores still 0–0. In 1976, a Lechia matchday programme said of Puszkarz; "Zdzisiek is a true virtuoso of technique: with the ball every kick every nod, he does whatever he wants with it. Ambition, determination, speed, and conducting abilities - this is a list of his attributes, which he has recently enriched with no less important: effectiveness".

In 1982, Lechia suffered relegation to the third tier, and as a result Puszkarz left to join Bałtyk Gdynia. Despite many Ekstraklasa teams showing interest in Puszkarz over the years, it was only when Lechia were relegated and with Bałtyk Gdynia in the Ekstraklasa when he finally moved teams. This ensured that he could stay in the Tricity area where he had spent his whole life thus far. While at Bałtyk, Puszkarz played a total of 67 games, scoring 10 goals.

After his time at Bałtyk, Puszkarz moved to Germany to play for Holstein Kiel where he spent two seasons, playing 54 games scoring 13 goals. It wasn't long before Puszkarz was back in Gdańsk when he signed for MOSiR Gdańsk. He played for MOSiR for a season before returning to Lechia Gdańsk.

On 28 March 1987, at the age of 37, Puszkarz achieved his dream of playing in the Ekstraklasa with Lechia. His first appearance with Lechia ended as a 1–0 defeat to Widzew Łódź. At the age of 38 Puszkarz made his final appearance for Lechia in a match against GKS Katowice on 11 June 1988, Lechia lost the match 2–1.

== After football ==
Puszkarz is commemorated by a star at the MOSiR Stadium in Gdańsk. The "Avenue of Stars" commemorates the efforts and success of former players and coaches.

In 2012, Puszkarz joined the Lechia youth coaching staff. In 2013, he signed a new contract and was appointed the assistant coach of Lechia's Młoda Ekstraklasa team.

In 2018, a mural of Zdzisław Puszkarz was painted on the side of an apartment building in Gdańsk.

== Awards ==
- 2011: Gold Cross of Merit, for achievements in football and its popularization
