= MOSiR Gdańsk =

Polish association football team

- Full name: Miejskiego Ośrodka Sportu i Rekreacji Gdańsk
- Dissolved: 1987; 38 years ago
- Ground: Stadion MOSiR
- Capacity: 12,244

MOSiR Gdańsk was a football team based in Gdańsk, Poland. The club, Miejskiego Ośrodka Sportu i Rekreacji Gdańsk ("Municipal Sports and Recreation Center Gdańsk"), played its games at the Stadion MOSiR, the centre in the city for the sports club in which the football team got its name from. In the 1980s MOSiR Gdańsk often played in the IV liga, and often played against Gdańsk rivals Gedania during these years. In 1987 MOSiR Gdańsk were involved in a merger with Gedania Gdańsk, likely to try to improve the fortunes of the clubs by focusing on one team and having a greater pool of players to initially choose from. This led to Gedania absorbing all aspects of the club and officially leading to MOSiR Gdańsk being dissolved.

Former players for the club include Polish internationals Zdzisław Puszkarz and Stanisław Burzyński, while Zbigniew Żemojtel was the club's last manager.

== See also ==
- Gdańsk Derby
- Sport in Gdańsk
