= Michal Pichnarčik =

Slovak ice hockey defenceman

- Born: November 20, 1990 (age 34); Prešov, Czechoslovakia
- Height: 6 ft 2 in (188 cm)
- Weight: 201 lb (91 kg; 14 st 5 lb)
- Position: Defence
- Shoots: Left
- team Former teams: Free agent HC Košice; HKM Zvolen; Yertis Pavlodar; Podhale Nowy Targ; HK Aktobe; Lotos PKH Gdańsk
- Playing career: 2008–present

Michal Pichnarčik (born November 20, 1990) is a Slovak professional ice hockey defenceman. He is currently a free agent having last played for Lotos PKH Gdańsk of the Polska Hokej Liga.

Pichnarčik previously played in the Tipsport Liga for HK Orange 20, HC Košice and HKM Zvolen. He won two league championships, with Košice in 2010 and Zvolen in 2013. In total, he played 183 regular season games and 28 playoff games in the Tipsport Liga. A stay-at-home defenceman, he did not score a single goal in the league but did contribute twelve assists.

Pichnarčik left Slovakia in 2016 and signed with Yertis Pavlodar of the Kazakhstan Hockey Championship. On September 6, 2017, he moved to Poland with Podhale Nowy Targ of the Polska Hokej Liga where he produced the best offensive numbers of his professional career to date, two goals and fourteen assists. On September 5, 2018, he joined Remparts de Tours of the French Division 1. He then returned to Kazakhstan for the 2019–20 season with HK Aktobe as well as returning to Poland for four games with Lotus PHK Gdańsk.

Internationally, Pichnarčik played in the 2008 IIHF World U18 Championships for Slovakia, playing six games and registering one assist. He would however make no further appearances for Slovakia in junior or professional level afterwards.
