= Tomasz Korynt =

Polish footballer (born 1954)

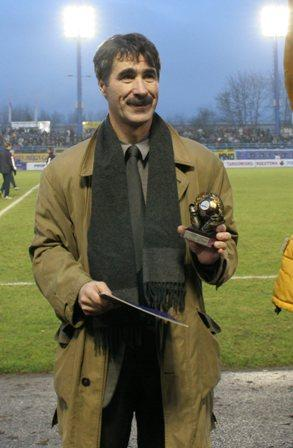
- Korynt in 2009

Personal information
- Full name: Tomasz Marek Korynt
- Date of birth: 27 October 1954 (age 72)
- Place of birth: Gdynia, Poland
- Height: 1.83 m (6 ft 0 in)
- Position: Forward

Youth career
- –1972: Lechia Gdańsk

Senior career*
Years	Team	Apps	(Gls)
1972–1977	Lechia Gdańsk	102	(33)
1977–1982	Arka Gdynia	135	(41)
1982–1983	Bałtyk Gdynia	24	(5)
1984	First Vienna		
1984–1986	Limoges	35	(5)
1987–1989	Bałtyk Gdynia	57	(10)
1989	Favoritner AC		
1990–1991	USC Seitenstetten		
1997–1999	Orzeł Choczewo		
2004	Orzeł Choczewo		
Total		353	(94)

International career
1979	Poland	1	(0)
- * Club domestic league appearances and goals

Tomasz Korynt (born 27 October 1954) is a Polish former footballer who played as a forward. He spent the start of his career with teams in the Tricity area, starting his career with Lechia Gdańsk, before later playing for Arka Gdynia and Bałtyk Gdynia. In his later career, he spent time in France playing for Limoges, and in Austria with First Vienna, Favoritner AC and USC Seitenstetten. He is the son of Polish international Roman Korynt.

== Career ==
=== Lechia Gdańsk ===
Korynt started his career with Lechia Gdańsk, firstly playing with the youth team before advancing to the first team in 1971. His Lechia debut came on 18 June 1972 against Gwardia Koszalin, playing the full 90 minutes and scored 2 goals. In the first two seasons as part of the first team, Korynt failed to make a claim on a starting position playing only 6 times in that period. The season after Korynt started to make a greater impact on the first team, playing 16 times and scoring 6 goals. The following two seasons after Lechia finished runners up in their league, firstly losing out by two points, and the second time finishing behind arch rivals Arka Gdynia. The following season Korynt had his greatest goalscoring season for Lechia, scoring 9 in the league in 23 games. In total for Lechia Korynt played in 109 games scoring 36 goals.

=== Arka Gdynia ===
For the 1977–78 season, Korynt moved to Lechia's rivals Arka Gdynia to the dismay of Lechia fans. He enjoyed his greatest success while at Arka, playing six seasons with the club, all in the top flight of Polish football. While Arka often finished lower to mid-table, they provided Korynt with his only chance of silverware during his career. In 1979 Arka won the Polish Cup by beating Wisła Kraków 2-1 in the final. While he did not play for Arka in the cup final he played in both European games for Arka the following season against Beroe Stara Zagora, losing 4-3 over the two legs. In 1982 Arka were relegated from the I liga.

=== Later years ===
After Arka's relegation Korynt joined their city rivals Bałtyk Gdynia who were playing in the I liga. After spending 18 months with the team and playing 24 games scoring 5 goals, Korynt joined Austrian second division side First Vienna before moving to France joining second division team Limoges. After 3 seasons away Korynt returned to Bałtyk Gdynia in 1987, helping Bałtyk who were then in the II liga win promotion to the I liga by finishing runners up. Bałtyk were relegated after one season in the top division and finished the following season in 10th. He once again moved to Austria, firstly playing with Favoritner AC for one season, before playing for FC Seitenstetten over two seasons.

After his time with Seitenstetten, Korynt retired from professional football. He later returned to playing for Orzeł Choczewo over the course of two spells, scoring 34 goals in the fourth tier for Orzeł during those two spells. After retiring from football after his spell with Seitenstetten, Korynt moved to working in business, while also having spells as a coach for KP Gdynia and the Bałtyk Gdynia youth. In 2012, he was employed by Arka as a consultant alongside Janusz Kupcewicz.

== International career ==
Korynt received one cap for Poland playing on 4 April 1979 against Hungary in a friendly. He came on as a substitute in the 74th minute.

== Personal life ==
His father is Roman Korynt, a Lechia Gdańsk legend who played a total of 340 times for Lechia, the second highest amount for the club, and played 207 games for Lechia in the Ekstraklasa, the highest for a Lechia player. Other teams he played for are Gedania Gdańsk, OWKS Lublin and CWKS Warszawa. He received 32 caps for Poland.

== Honours ==
Arka Gdynia

- Polish Cup: 1978–79
