= Pomeranian Hockey Club 2014 =

- City: Gdańsk, Poland
- League: Polska Hokej Liga
- Founded: 21 July 2014; 11 years ago
- Folded: 24 July 2020; 5 years ago
- Home arena: Hala Olivia
- Colours: White, Navy

Pomeranian Hockey Club 2014 was a professional ice hockey team in Gdańsk, Poland. The team formerly played in the Polska Hokej Liga, the top-level ice hockey league in Poland, with their highest finish being 5th place, which they achieved in their final year of competing.

== History ==
The Pomeranian Hockey Club was set up in 2014 with the intentions of keeping an ice hockey club in the city of Gdańsk after Stoczniowiec Gdańsk dissolved in 2012. While Hockey Club Gdańsk was formed in 2012, agreeing to take on Stoczniowiec's debt, and meaning that by the time the club was formed there was already another ice hockey team in the city, the members continued to push on creating the team anyway.

In the clubs first season they sponsored by MH Automatyka, and decided to use the name Stoczniowiec due to the traditions of the name and ice hockey in the city. The club were therefore officially known as MH Automatyka Stoczniowiec 2014 Gdańsk during their first season. The team started playing in the 1. Liga and in its first three seasons the clubs were involved in the promotional playoffs, securing promotion at the end of the 2015–16 season after beating UKH Dębica.

After the club secured promotion to the Polska Hokej Liga it was announced that they would be dropping Stoczniowiec from their name, in part to stop confusion with the original team called Stoczniowiec which had reformed, and in part to create their own clubs identity. The club was therefore known as MH Automatyka Gdańsk for its first season in the PHL. MH Automatyka secured their status as a top division side finishing in 9th out of the 11 clubs, and comfortably finishing above the relegation zones. Experienced Czech forward Petr Polodna was among the players who joined the squad, later joined by Gdańsk native Marek Wróbel. In the same season the club's youth section won the Polish Junior Championships. The next two seasons provided similar results for MH Automatyka, finishing in 8th and 9th place.

For the 2019–20 the club was sponsored by Grupa Lotos, and were known as Lotos PKH Gdańsk for the season. In terms of achievements it was the most successful for the club, reaching the playoffs for the first time, however due to the COVID-19 pandemic the league was cancelled and Lotos PKH along with three other clubs were officially given a 5th-place finish. The season however provided difficulties behind the scenes, with the pandemic affecting the clubs finances, and the management company of Hala Olivia and the club unable to reach agreements on rental prices and the sharing of marketing income. Due to the two sides being unable to reach an agreement, and with the club unable to play anywhere else in Gdańsk the only option for the club was to drop out of the league and ultimately suspend all activities indefinitely.

=== Historic club names ===
Despite the fact that the company who owned the club were called "Pomeranian Hockey Club 2014" (Officially the Pomeranian Hockey Club Association 2014, (Polish: Stowarzyszenie Pomorski Klub Hokejowy 2014) this name was never used for the ice hockey team, despite this the name of the company was often used in the media for articles relating to the club. The club itself however officially used three different names during its history, these being;

- 2014: MH Automatyka Stoczniowiec 2014 Gdańsk
- 2016: MH Automatyka Gdańsk
- 2020: Lotos PKH Gdańsk

== Honours ==
Polska Hokej Liga

- 5th place: 2019–20 (highest finish)

1. Liga

- Winners: 2015–16

Junior Championships

- Winners: 2016–17
