= Stanisław Burzyński (footballer) =

Polish association football player

Personal information
- Full name: Stanisław Ryszard Burzyński
- Date of birth: 19 October 1948
- Place of birth: Gdańsk, Poland
- Date of death: 5 November 1991 (aged 43)
- Place of death: Gdynia, Poland
- Height: 1.82 m (6 ft 0 in)
- Position: Goalkeeper

Senior career*
| Years | Team | Apps | (Gls) |
| 1966–1969 | Lechia Gdańsk | 21 | (0) |
| 1969–1975 | Arka Gdynia | 166 | (0) |
| 1975–1980 | Widzew Łódź | 133 | (0) |
| 1982–1983 | Bałtyk Gdynia | 21 | (0) |
| 1983–1985 | Arka Gdynia | 21 | (0) |
| 1986–1988 | MOSiR Gdańsk | | |
| Total | | 362 | (0) |

International career
| 1976 | Poland | 2 | (0) |
- * Club domestic league appearances and goals

Stanisław Ryszard Burzyński (19 October 1948 – 5 November 1991) was a Polish footballer who played as a goalkeeper. The majority of his career was spent with teams in the Tricity area, with the exception of a spell in Łódź.

== Biography ==
Burzyński started his playing career with Lechia Gdańsk in 1966, making his senior debut in the Polish Cup in the 3–0 victory over Wisła Nowe. In total, Burzyński made 22 appearances in all competitions over the span of three seasons with Lechia.

In 1969, he moved to Lechia Gdańsk's main rivals, Arka Gdynia. He spent seven seasons with Arka over the course of two spells, becoming a fan favourite during that time. In total, he made 199 appearances for Arka, with 166 of those coming in the league, and helped Arka to the top division by winning the II liga during his first spell with the club.

In 1975 Burzyński moved to Widzew Łódź, one of the biggest teams in Poland at the time. During his time with Widzew, the team finished 2nd in the league three times, only failing to become Polish Champions in 1978–79 due to goal difference. Widzew also finished runners-up in the Polish Cup final in 1977. In total, Burzyński played 177 times for Widzew from 1975 to 1980.

In 1980, his career was put on hold after being sent to prison for driving under the influence of alcohol and killing an 86-year-old man in an accident. He was released from prison in 1981, moving back to the Tricity to play for Bałtyk Gdynia, Arka Gdynia and MOSiR Gdańsk. Before the accident he was due to join English club Ipswich Town which fell through due to his time in prison. Due to what Burzyński saw as a missed opportunity in his career, he fell into alcoholism, failing to regain his form at any of his final three clubs until he retired in 1988.

After his career, Burzyński still struggled with his alcohol issues, committing suicide by jumping from his 9th floor apartment window on 5 November 1991.

== Honours ==
Arka Gdynia

- II liga North: 1973–74

Widzew Łódź

- Ekstraklasa runner-up: 1976–77, 1978–79, 1979–80
- Polish Cup runner-up: 1976–77
