= Orlik Opole =

MUKS Orlik Opole
- City: Opole, Poland
- League: Polska Hokej Liga
- Founded: 1998
- Home arena: Toropol
- Colours: Blue, Yellow
- General manager: (Poland) Dariusz Sułek
- Head coach: (Poland) Jacek Szopiński
- Website: http://orlikopole.pl/

MUKS Orlik Opole was an ice hockey team in Opole, Poland. They played in the Polska Hokej Liga, the top level of ice hockey in Poland. The club was founded in 1998, as a continuation of the 'Odra Opole' team, which was founded in 1946 and continued until the 1980s. Until the 2013/14 season, they played in Polish 1. Liga, the second level of Polish hockey. In August 2014, they obtained a license to play in the PHL. For the 2019/20 season they folded before re-branding under new ownership as Opole HK for the 2020/21 season.

== Achievements ==
- 1. Liga champion (1) : 2003.
