= Ski jumping hills in Gdańsk =

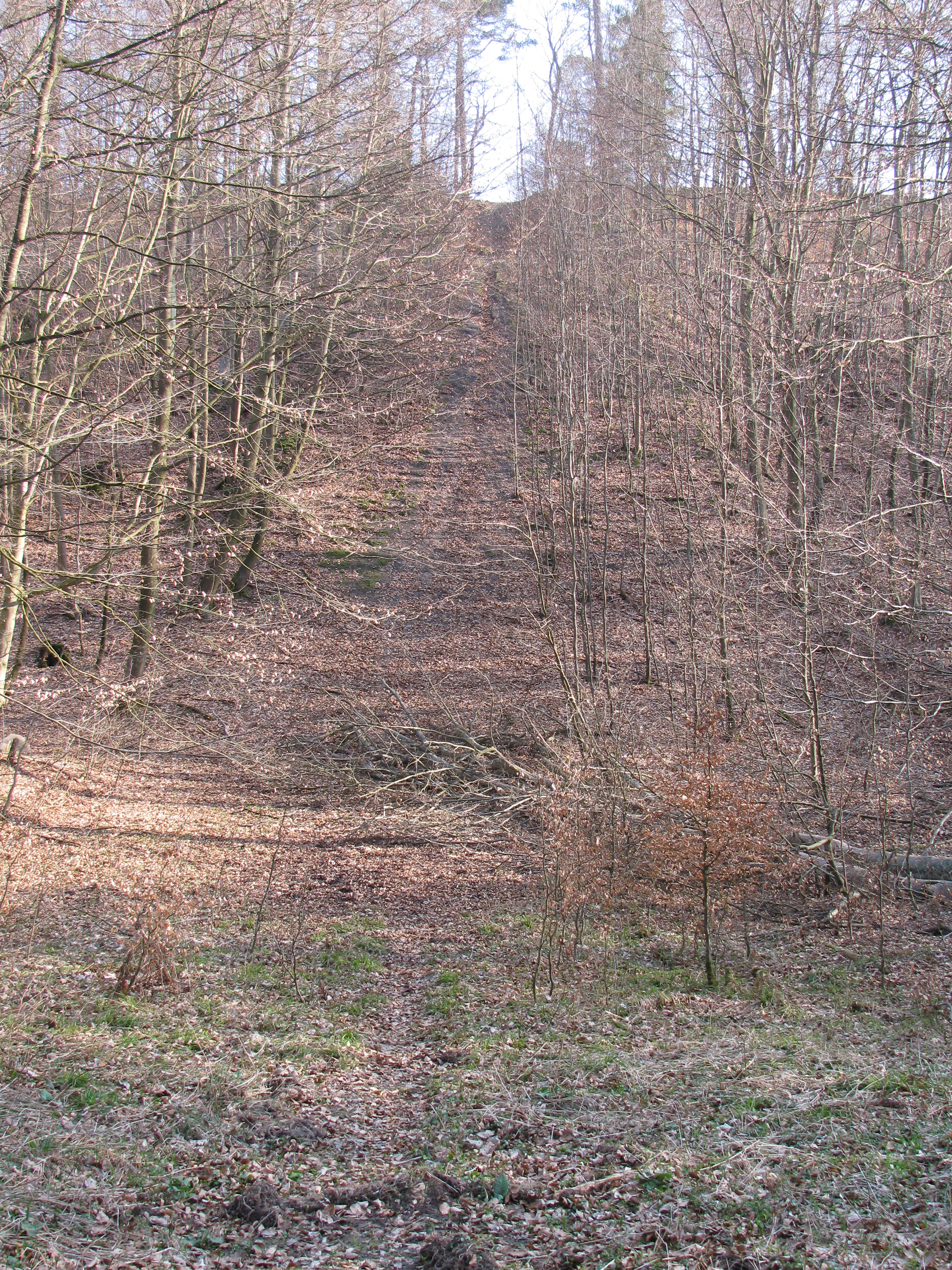
One of the two former ski jumping hills, located in Dolina Radości

Throughout its history, the city of Gdańsk in Poland has had two permanent ski jumping hills, the construction points of both of which did not exceed 40 metres (130 ft). Both of them are now defunct.

== Dolina Radości ski jumping hill ==
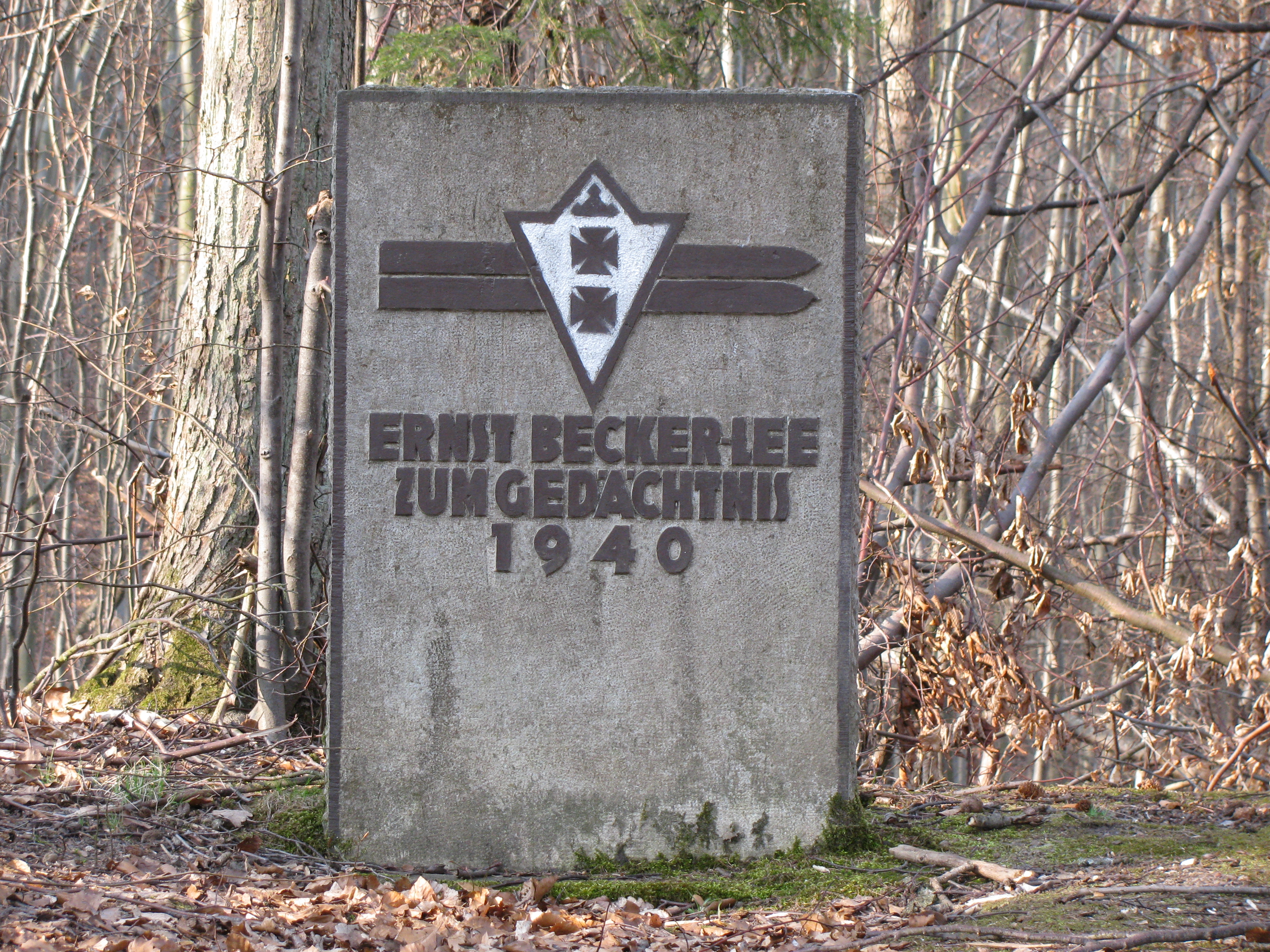
The memorial commemorating the death of Ernst Becker-Lee

The ski jumping hill in Dolina Radości, located in Oliwa, was the first such hill to be built in Gdańsk, then known as the Free City of Danzig. It was completed in 1932 and had a construction point of 35 metres (115 ft). In 1940, Ernst Becker-Lee, a German ski jumper, died on the hill. A small memorial was erected near his place of death. Regular competitions were held into the mid-1950s, with the hill's record being set by a jumper from Zakopane who had the surname Kołtuń, at 39 metres (128 ft).

Competitions on the national level were held in Dolina Radości into the 1960s. After 1970, the buildings surrounding the hill progressively decayed, with an observation tower near the hill remaining extant until the 1980s. The wooden planks that the facility was constructed from still remain intact in some places.

== Dolina Henrietty ski jumping hill ==
In the 1930s, in Wrzeszcz (then Langfuhr), in what is known as the Dolina Henrietty or Samborowo, a ski jumping hill with a construction point of 30 metres (98 ft) was built. The record-holder of the hill was Kazimierz Polus, who, in 1970, achieved a distance of 34.5 metres (113 ft). Currently, it is used by enjoyers of downhill mountain biking and is nicknamed Tomac after the American cyclist John Tomac.

== Modern constructions ==
In the 2000s, using the fame of Adam Małysz, Grupa Lotos proposed the construction of a small, artificial sheet plastic ski jumping hill on the Długi Targ in Gdańsk. Małysz himself was to use the track, which was later abandoned for a plan to allow youth to do ski jumping on the hill; neither plan was realized.
