= Portowiec Gdańsk =

Polish sports club

KS Portowiec Gdańsk
- Full name: Klub Sportowy Portowiec Gdańsk
- Founded: 1957; 68 years ago 2009; 16 years ago (refounded)
- Manager: Michał Tomasikiewicz
- League: Klasa A Gdańsk II
- 2023–24: Regional league Gdańsk I, 14th of 17 (relegated)
Home colours	Away colours

Portowiec Gdańsk is a sports club based in Gdańsk, Poland, founded in 1957.

== Club names ==
- 1957 – Klub Sportowy Portowiec Gdańsk
- 1969 – MRKS Gdańsk (Maritime Workers' Sports Club Gdańsk), after a merger with Motława Gdańsk
- 2009 – reactivation of the club under the name Klub Sportowy Portowiec Gdańsk

== Football ==
The sports club enjoyed their greatest success in the 1970s and 1980s when the team spent seven seasons in the third tier. After troubles off the field, the club was dissolved in 2001, before being reformed in 2009. Since being reformed and winning promotion in 2010, Portowiec have faced financial issues to run the club. Historically, the club's colours have been blue and brown.

=== Rivalries ===
Having played in the regional leagues for most of their history, Portowiec's rivalries have been teams from the Gdańsk area, and as a result games involving the Gdańsk Derby. In the early years of their formation, Portowiec had a minor rivalry with the city's giants, Lechia Gdańsk, facing them seven times between 1970–83. Due to playing in the lower levels, Portowiec has played in games against Gedania 1922 Gdańsk, Stoczniowiec Gdańsk, and Jaguar Gdańsk.

=== History ===
Since re-entering the leagues in 2009.

Season	League	Tier	Position	Matches	Pts.	W	D	L	GF	GA	GD
2009–10	Klasa B (Group Gdańsk III)	VII	1 of 13	24	66	21	3	0	140	27	+113
2010–11	Klasa A (Group Gdańsk II)	VI	7 of 12	22	33	10	3	9	59	41	+18
2011–12	Klasa A (Group Gdańsk II)	VI	4 of 12	22	40	13	1	8	41	33	+8
2012–13	Klasa A (Group Gdańsk II)	VI	3 of 13	24	49	16	1	7	58	34	+24
2013–14	Klasa A (Group Gdańsk II)	VI	1 of 14	25	64	21	1	3	110	30	+80
2014–15	District Class (Group Gdańsk I)	V	13 of 16	30	24	6	6	18	53	96	-43
2015–16	Klasa A (Group Gdańsk I)	VI	7 of 14	26	40	13	1	12	54	55	-1
2016–17	Klasa A (Group Gdańsk I)	VI	6 of 14	26	40	12	4	10	69	53	+14
2017–18	Klasa A (Group Gdańsk I)	VI	1 of 14	26	61	19	4	3	85	19	+66
2018–19	District Class (Group Gdańsk I)	V	13 of 16	30	33	9	6	15	49	70	-21
2019–20	Klasa A (Group Gdańsk II)	VI	14 of 14	13	5	1	2	10	16	60	-44
2020–21	Klasa A (Group Gdańsk II)	VI	11 of 15	28	27	8	3	17	47	92	-45

== Other sections ==
Alongside football Portowiec has a section for yachting.

== See also ==
- Gdańsk Derby
- Sport in Gdańsk
