= Aleksander Kupcewicz =

Polish footballer

Personal information
- Full name: Aleksander Kupcewicz
- Date of birth: 1 April 1923
- Place of birth: Baranavichy, Poland
- Date of death: 25 October 1983 (aged 60)
- Place of death: Olsztyn, Poland
- Position: Forward

Senior career*
Years	Team	Apps	(Gls)
1936–1939	Strzelec Baranowicze		
1945–1957	Lechia Gdańsk	96	(33)
Total		96	(33)

Managerial career
- 1958–1959: Stal Kraśnik
- 1962: KSZO Ostrowiec Świętokrzyski
- 1964–1967: Warmia Olsztyn
- 1969–1971: OKS-OZOS Olsztyn
- * Club domestic league appearances and goals

Aleksander Kupcewicz (1 April 1923 – 25 October 1983) was a Polish footballer who played as a forward. He spent his whole playing career playing with Lechia Gdańsk, later managing three clubs in the lower divisions.

== Biography ==
Kupcewicz started playing football with his local club Strzelec Baranowicze. He later moved to Gdańsk and played for Lechia Gdańsk, whom he joined after World War II. He made his debut on 9 December 1945 against SKS Płomień Gdańsk in a 11–4 win. Kupcewicz made 61 appearances and scored 7 goals in the I liga, Poland's top division, including playing during the 1956 season when Lechia finished 3rd in the I liga, still their joint highest ever finish in the top division. While at Lechia he made a total of 130 appearances and scored 45 goals in a playing career that spanned 13 years.

After his playing career, Kupcewicz went into management, managing Stal Kraśnik, KSZO Ostrowiec Świętokrzyski, and Warmia Olsztyn.

Kupcewicz had two sons who also played football, Zbigniew Kupcewicz and Janusz Kupcewicz, both of whom also spent parts of their career with Lechia Gdańsk.
