= Roman Korynt =

Polish footballer (1929–2018)

Personal information
- Date of birth: 12 October 1929
- Place of birth: Tczew, Pomeranian Voivodeship, Polish People's Republic
- Date of death: 15 July 2018 (aged 88)
- Place of death: Gdynia, Pomeranian Voivodeship, Third Polish Republic
- Position: Defender

Youth career
- 1946–1948: Grom Gdynia

Senior career*
Years	Team	Apps	(Gls)
1948–1949	Gedania Gdańsk		
1949–1950	OWKS Lublin		
1951–1952	CWKS Warsaw	15	(0)
1953–1968	Lechia Gdańsk	327	(9)
Total		342	(9)

International career
1952–1959	Poland	32	(0)
- * Club domestic league appearances and goals

Roman Korynt (12 October 1929 – 15 July 2018) was a Polish footballer who played as a defender. Most of his career was spent with Lechia Gdańsk, spending over 15 years at the club. He also had short spells with Gedania Gdańsk, OWKS Lublin, and CWKS Warsaw. He received 32 caps for Poland between 1952 and 1959.

== Biography ==
=== Early years ===
Korynt was born in Tczew in 1929. Both of his parents came from Kociewie, with his father's parents both being Greek emigrants with the family's name originally being Korinth. Originally his sporting passion started with boxing training with MKS Wybrzeże while also developing a passion for football at this time joining Grom Gdynia. Korynt joined Gedania Gdańsk in 1948 playing with the club for just over a season before being called up into the army.

=== Military service ===
In 1949, Korynt started his mandatory conscription, being placed in a unit of ordinary conscripts and not a unit of athlete conscripts. Zbigniew Piórkowski, a well known boxer who Korynt was friends with, ordered that Korynt should be in a unit with athletic conscripts. Korynt was then transferred to OWKS Lublin as part of his military service. His performances with OWKS Lublin caught the attention of the Central Military Sports Club (Polish: Centralny Wojskowy Klub Sportowy "CWKS") and he was transferred to CWKS Warsaw in 1951 for the remainder of his military service. During his time with CWKS, he made 15 league appearances and 6 in the Polish Cup. He left CWKS in 1952 after his military service was completed.

=== Lechia Gdańsk ===
Korynt moved back to the Tricity area where he grew up and joined Lechia Gdańsk. He made his Lechia debut on 15 March 1953 against Cracovia in a 0–0 draw. In his first season with Lechia, they suffered relegation to the second tier, winning promotion the season after back into the I liga. In 1955, Lechia reached the Polish Cup final by beating Kolejarz Nowy Sącz, Wisła Kraków, Gwardia Warsaw and Odra Opole to play CWKS Warsaw in the final. Korynt played 4 times in the cup run, including playing in the final, which CWKS Warsaw won 5–0. The following season in 1956 was to see the biggest success in Lechia's early history with the team, finishing 3rd in the I liga. At the beginning of the season, many expected Lechia to be fighting for their position to stay in the league. Despite only scoring 25 goals in 22 games, performances from Korynt helped the side to limit the number of goals they conceded with the team keeping 9 clean sheets in the 22-game season. After the 3rd-place finish Lechia started to face a gradual decline in on-field performances, with the team being relegated to the II liga at the end of the 1962–63 season. It was in the II liga where Korynt has his greatest success in terms of goals scored, scoring 5 in the 1964–65 season. After Lechia suffered another relegation, this time to the III liga, Korynt played 7 times before he retired from professional football, having played his last game against Arkonia Szczecin. Korynt made a total of 340 appearances for Lechia, 207 of which were in the top tier. Korynt is currently the only Lechia player to have made over 200 appearances in the top division.

=== International career ===
On 25 May 1952, Korynt made his Poland international debut against Romania. In total he earned 32 caps for Poland between 1952 and 1959. His most famous international game coming on 20 October 1957 against the Soviet Union with Poland winning the game 2–1.

== Personal life and death ==
His son Tomasz Korynt, was also a footballer.

He has been awarded with three decorations; the Cross of Merit in 1995, the Knight's Cross of the Order of Polonia Restituta in 2001, and the Order of Polonia Restituta in 2011.

Korynt is commemorated by a star at the MOSiR Stadium in Gdańsk. The "Avenue of Stars" commemorates the efforts and success of former players and coaches.

He died on 15 July 2018, at the age of 88. His funeral took place on 19 July at the cemetery in Pierwoszyno.

== Honours ==
Lechia Gdańsk

- Ekstraklasa third place: 1956
- Polish Cup runner-up: 1954–55

== Awards ==
- 1995: Gold Cross of Merit
- 2001: Knight's Cross of the Order of Polonia Restituta
- 2011: Officer's Cross of the Order of Polonia Restituta
