= Marek Wróbel =

Polish ice hockey player

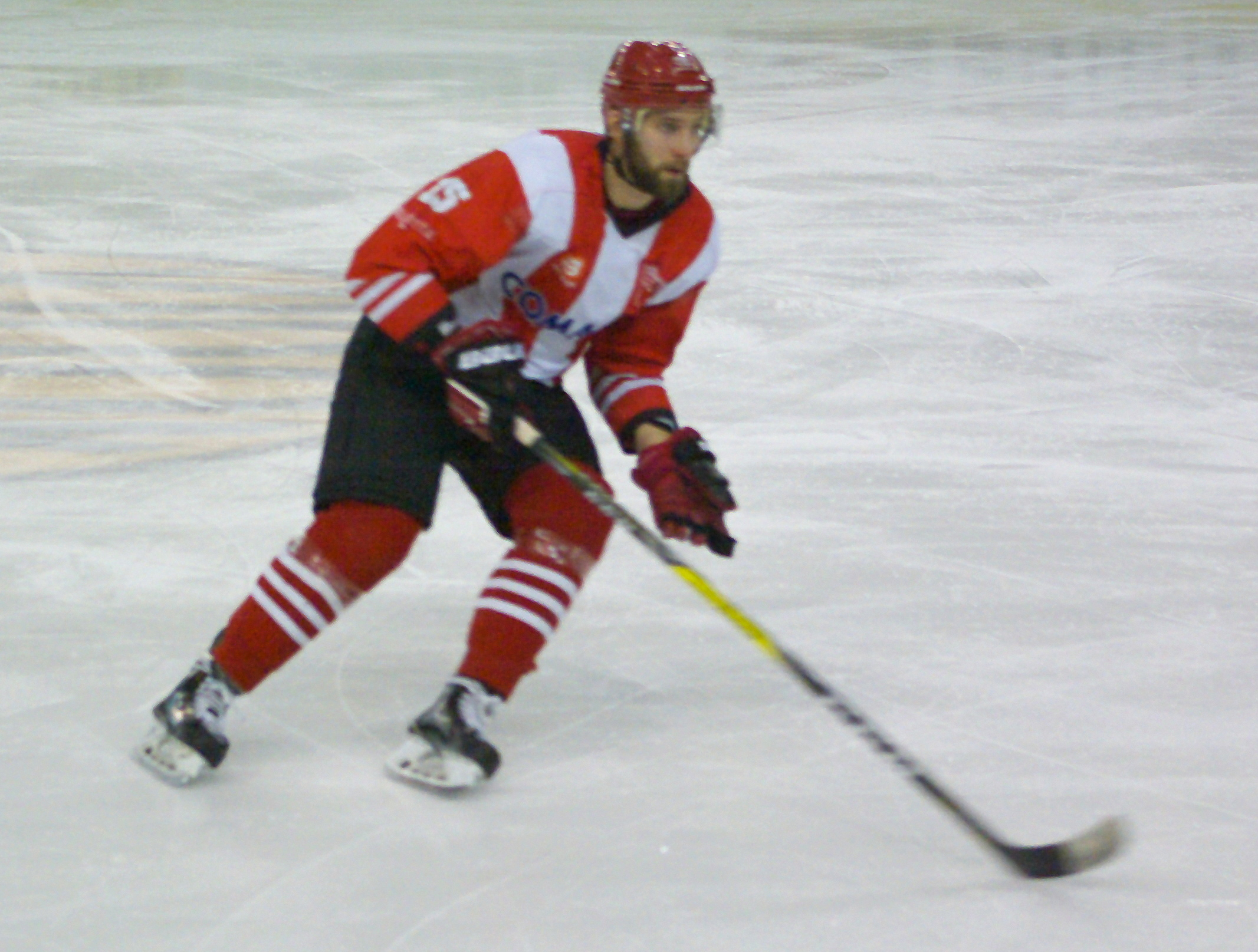
- Born: May 15, 1989 (age 36); Gdańsk, Poland
- Height: 6 ft 2 in (188 cm)
- Weight: 198 lb (90 kg; 14 st 2 lb)
- Position: Forward
- Shoots: Left
- Polska Hokej Liga team Former teams: KS Cracovia; TMH Polonia Bytom; TKH Toruń; Stoczniowiec Gdańsk
- Playing career: 2006–present

Marek Wróbel is a Polish ice hockey player who currently plays for KS Cracovia of the Polska Hokej Liga.
