= Zbigniew Kupcewicz =

Polish footballer

Personal information
- Full name: Zbigniew Kupcewicz
- Date of birth: 30 April 1952 (age 74)
- Place of birth: Gdańsk, Poland
- Position: Forward

Youth career
- 1965–1966: Gwardia Olsztyn

Senior career*
Years	Team	Apps	(Gls)
1966–1968	Warmia Olsztyn		
1968–1969	Stal Rzeszów		
1969–1970	Warmia Olsztyn		
1970	Pogoń Szczecin	4	(0)
1971–1972	Lechia Gdańsk	20	(4)
1973–1974	Stomil Olsztyn		
1974–1978	Arka Gdynia		
1978–1979	Zawisza Bydgoszcz		
1980–1982	RWB Adria		
1982–1983	Stomil Olsztyn		
- * Club domestic league appearances and goals

Zbigniew Kupcewicz (born 30 April 1952) is a Polish former footballer who played as a forward.

== Biography ==
Kupcewicz started playing football with Gwardia Olsztyn. He then played for Stal Rzeszów before joining I liga team Pogoń Szczecin. While with Pogoń, he made 4 appearances in the league over the 1969–70 season. Kupcewicz then moved to the Tricity, joining Lechia Gdańsk, making his debut on 28 March 1971 against Gwardia Koszalin. In total for Lechia Kupcewicz played in 20 games and scored 4 goals. After his time with Lechia, Kupcewicz joined Lechia's rivals Arka Gdynia. While at Arka he is noted as having scored the clubs first ever goal in the I liga, Poland's top division. After his first goal against ŁKS Łódź, he is known to have scored another 6 top flight goals for Arka.

Kupcewicz's father, Aleksander Kupcewicz, and his brother, Janusz Kupcewicz, were also both former footballers.
