= Janusz Kupcewicz =

Polish footballer (1955–2022)

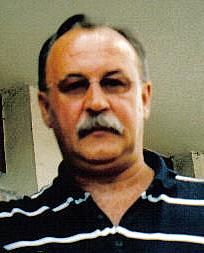

Personal information
- Date of birth: 9 December 1955
- Place of birth: Gdańsk, Poland
- Date of death: 4 July 2022 (aged 66)
- Place of death: Gdańsk, Poland
- Height: 1.78 m (5 ft 10 in)
- Position: Midfielder

Youth career
- 1964–1968: Warmia Olsztyn
- Stomil Olsztyn

Senior career*
Years	Team	Apps	(Gls)
1974–1982	Arka Gdynia	161	(26)
1982–1983	Lech Poznań	24	(9)
1983–1985	Saint-Étienne	35	(2)
1985–1986	AEL	23	(2)
1986–1988	Lechia Gdańsk	39	(8)
1988–1989	Adanaspor	15	(4)
Total		297	(51)

International career
1976–1983	Poland	20	(5)

Managerial career
- 1993–1994: Poland (futsal)
- 1995: Lechia Gdańsk
- 1996–1999: Radunia Stężyca
- 1999–2001: Poland U21 (assistant manager)
- 2004–2005: Cartusia Kartuzy
- 2021: AS Pomorze Gdańsk
Medal record
Men's football
Representing Poland
FIFA World Cup
Third place	1982 Spain
- * Club domestic league appearances and goals

Janusz Bogdan Kupcewicz (9 December 1955 – 4 July 2022) was a Polish professional footballer who played as a midfielder.

Widely regarded as one of the best Polish players of his era, he most notably won the bronze with the national team at 1982 World Cup, in which he was a key player with his final goal being instrumental in the success.

He was voted in Arka Gdynia's best all-time XI after winning their first ever Polish Cup in 1979. He then went on to win the title with Lech Poznań in 1983.

He played for a number of other clubs, including abroad, and after retirement from playing he was a manager, PE teacher, and local politician.

== Career ==
=== Club career ===
Despite being from Gdańsk, he started his career at the two Olsztyn clubs: Warmia and Stomil, having gone through the youth teams at the former.

He then returned to his native Gdańsk and spent 8 seasons at Arka Gdynia having arrived there in 1974. The following season, 1975–76, he was the Second Division's top scorer. With Arka he achieved a historic club first Polish Cup in 1979. This success, along with his national team exploits, earned him a transfer to Lech Poznań, where he also won a historic national title in 1983.

He then moved abroad to France to play for AS Saint-Etienne, with the transfer fee raised privately to the sum of €380 000. He stayed there for 2 seasons (1983–1985), however they were relegated from the Premier Division in 1984. He spent the 1985–86 season at Greek club AEL. However his time abroad was plagued by injuries.

He returned to his hometown and joined Lechia where he stayed for the next two seasons. This caused controversies given his links and allegiance to bitter derby rivals Arka. He suffered relegation with Lechia in 1989.

He finished his playing career at Turkish club Adanaspor.

=== International career ===
In his career he earned overall 20 caps for the Poland national team, scoring 5 goals. He made his national debut in 1976. He was at the 1978 tournament as a reserve player, but by the 1982 World Cup he was a key member of the squad, with Poland finishing in third place. The third place was won thanks to his famous winning goal against France to make it 3–2.

=== Managerial career ===
After retiring from playing, he became the manager of the Poland national futsal team in the early 90s. He then went on to coach the then sixth division Pomeranian club Radunia Stężyca between 1996 and 1999, the Polish U-21 team as assistant manager 1999–2001, briefly Lechia Gdańsk in 1995, and between 2004 and 2005 lower league Cartusia Kartuzy. He was also a consultant at Arka Gdynia between 2001 and 2003. He returned to Arka as a consultant once more in 2012, alongside Tomasz Korynt.

=== Teaching career ===
He taught PE at primary school number 10 in the Chylonia district of Gdynia.

=== Political career ===
He was a Gdynia City Council candidate on the Civic Platform electoral list in 2006 and a Sejm candidate in 2007. Then, having switched to the Polish People's Party, he ran as a candidate for the Pomeranian Voivodeship Assembly in 2010 and to the lower house of parliament in 2011. In 2014, he became a regional councillor, his only electoral success. In 2015 and 2019, he unsuccessfully ran for the Sejm again. In 2018 he did not renew his councillor seat mandate.

== Personal life, death and legacy ==
Kupcewicz's father, Aleksander, and his brother, Zbigniew, were also both professional footballers.

Late in his life, Kupcewicz was in deteriorating health, leading to his death due to a stroke on 3 July 2022 at the age of 66. He was reported to have fallen ill while travelling by train and fainted on the train platform in Gdynia; an ambulance then transported him to a hospital in Gdańsk where he subsequently died. His diabetes and related cardiovascular complications were cited as likely contributors to his death.

Zbigniew Boniek called him one of the best ever Polish playmakers. Grzegorz Lato stated he was incredibly saddened and shocked at the news of his death as they only spoke recently and that they were very close friends in regular contact with each other.

His winning goal in Alicante against France at the 1982 World Cup to win the bronze medal for Poland was deemed to be his highlight of his career. Regarded as an exceptionally talented player, he was judged to have never reached his full potential due to persistent injuries during his playing career.

His involvement in the infamous Polish football corruption scandal was never fully explained; he never denied the allegations that he handled and transported bribes, but claimed in court he was far too drunk to remember the exact details.

He is widely regarded as Arka Gdynia's best-ever players, featuring in their all-time XI, Arka being a club he personally supported.

== Honours ==
Arka Gdynia

- Polish Cup: 1978–79

Lech Poznań

- Ekstraklasa: 1982–83

Poland

- FIFA World Cup third place: 1982

Individual

- Second Division top scorer: 1975–76
- All time best Arka Gdynia XI
