= Jacek Szopiński =

Polish ice hockey player and coach

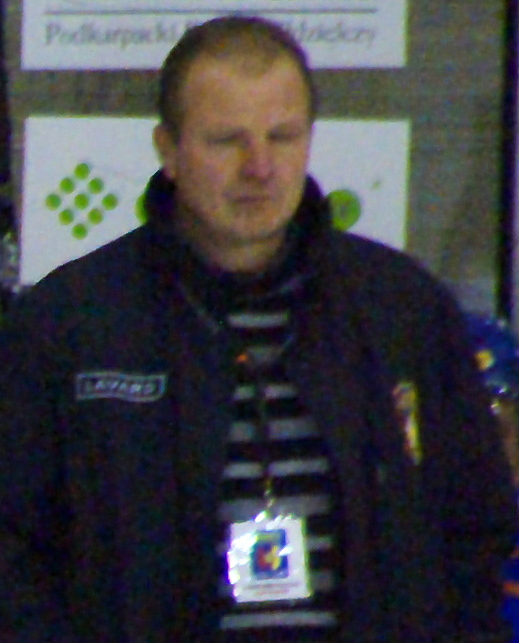
- Szopiński in 2011
- Born: 5 January 1964 (age 61) Nowy Targ, Poland
- Height: 5 ft 10 in (178 cm)
- Weight: 176 lb (80 kg; 12 st 8 lb)
- Position: Centre
- Shot: Left
- Played for: Podhale Nowy Targ; HC Morzine-Avoriaz; GKS Katowice
- National team: Poland
- Playing career: 1982–2001

Jacek Szopiński (born 5 January 1964) is a Polish former ice hockey player and coach. He played for Podhale Nowy Targ, HC Morzine-Avoriaz, and GKS Katowice during his career. Szopiński also played for the Polish national team at the 1988 Winter Olympics and several World Championships.
