= Gedania 1922 Gdańsk =

Polish association football team

- Full name: Gdański Klub Sportowy Gedania 1922
- Founded: 15 August 1922; 103 years ago (as Sportklub Gedania e.V. in Danzig); 16 May 1945; 81 years ago (refounded, as KS Gedania)
- Ground: Stadion Klubu Sportowego Gedania Gdańsk
- Capacity: 300
- Chairman: Władysław Barwiński
- Manager: Dariusz Stasiuk
- League: III liga, group II
- 2025–26: IV liga Pomerania, 1st of 18 (promoted)
- Website: gedania1922.pl
Home colours	Away colours	Third colours

GKS Gedania 1922 is a football team based in Gdańsk, Poland. Founded in 1945, the club was the reforming of Gedania Danzig.

== History ==
=== Gedania Danzig ===
Badge used by Gedania in the interbellum

Formed on 15 August 1922, Gedania was an ethnic Polish football team who played in the Free City of Danzig (present day Gdańsk, Poland). A sports club was created by the gymnastics club Towarzystwo Gimnastyczne Sokół (Falcon Gymnastic Company) and was initially given the name Polonia Danzig, Polonia being the Latinized name for Poland. The local authorities opposed this name however, with the club settling for the name Gedania Danzig, Gedania being the Latinized name of Gdańsk/Danzig. The footballing section of the sports club was not formed until 1933, and competed in the German lower divisions. After moderate success with two 3rd-place finishes and two 2nd-place finishes within the space of 4 years, Gedania Danzig was forced to cease operations due to the Nazi occupation of Poland. After the occupation of Danzig, the club's president, Henryk Kopeck, and two vice-presidents, Konrad Zdrojewski and Władysław Dębowski were shot. Most of the players and footballing staff were sent to concentration camps. In total 75 people associated with Gedania before its operations ceased died during the war.

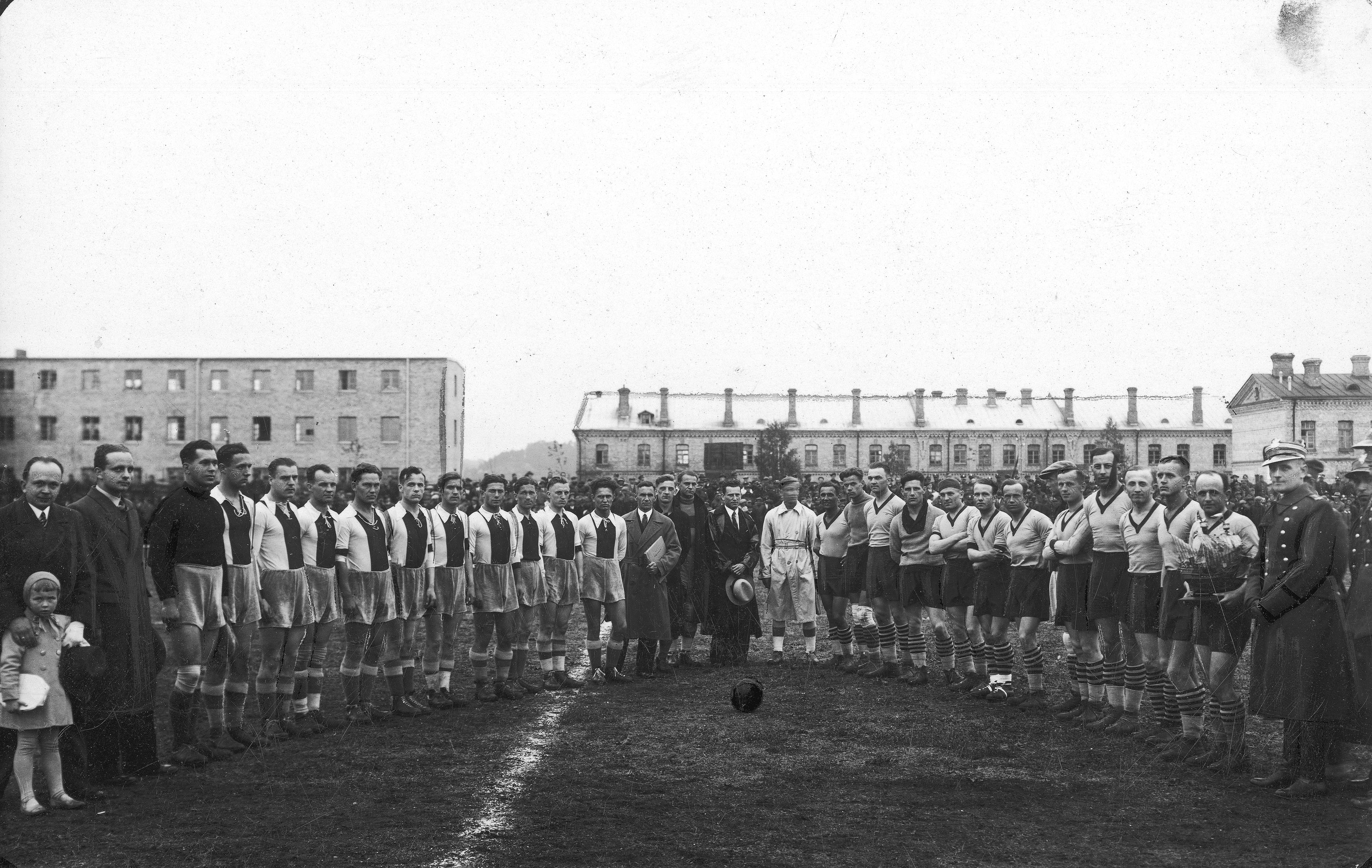
Friendly away game with Śmigły Wilno in 1934

=== Gedania Gdańsk ===
Gedania was formed on 16 May 1945 after the liberation of Gdańsk using the name KS Gedania. After some initial success in the football leagues Gedania soon found themselves playing in the lower divisions. In 1987 the team was involved in a merger with MOSiR Gdańsk. The team experienced a second merger in 2003, this time with Flotylla Gdańsk. In 2006 the football section of the sports club left and changed its name to GKS Gedania 1922 in reference to the year the initial Gedania sports club was formed. The team moved to their new home in 2012, a sports and recreation complex at Aleja Hallera 201. In 2015 Gedania were promoted to the fourth tier finishing runners-up in their league. This was managed due to the team winning 14 of their final 15 games, and amassing a 13-game winning streak.

== Rivalries ==
Having played in the regional leagues for most of their history Gedania's rivalries have been teams from the Gdańsk area, and as a result games involving the Gdańsk Derby. In the early years of their formation Gedania had a strong rivalry with Lechia Gdańsk, playing 9 times between 1945 and 1951. The derby between the two teams was not contested again for over 50 years until the two teams last played in 2004. Since the turn of the century Gedania has been involved in more derbies, with the club playing Stoczniowiec Gdańsk 14 times in the league over 10 seasons from 2001 to 2011 and have played Jaguar Gdańsk in the league most seasons since 2012. Another of Gedania's rivals local rivals are Portowiec Gdańsk who they first played in the 1970s. The two teams last played during the 2014–15 season.

== Colours ==
Gedania's home colours are typically mainly white shirts with a red detail, white shorts, and often having blue socks. These are the same colours that were used by Gedania Danzig who often wore white and red striped shirts, blue shorts, and blue socks. In recent years the club has often had a white shirt with a red diagonal sash, the away shirt being the opposite design with a red shirt and white sash. For the 2021–22 season the club designed their shirts with a single vertical stripe down the centre of the shirt in celebration of the 100th anniversary of Gedania Danzig forming, and this being the style that the team used often before the war.

== Honours ==
District Championships (III tier)

- Champions: 1946, 1950, 1955
- Runners-up: 1947, 1948
- Third place: 1949

III liga (IV tier)

- Champions: 1967–77, 1982–83
- Runners-up: 2003–04
- Third place: 1981–82

IV liga Pomerania (V tier)

- Champions: 2021–22, 2025–26

Regional league Gdańsk (VI tier)

- Runners-up: 2014–15
- Third place 2007–08

== Former players ==
Players who played for Gedania and the Poland national team at some point during their careers.

- Krzysztof Adamczyk (1970–1976)
- Roman Korynt (1948–1949)
- Rafał Murawski (1999)

== See also ==
- Gdańsk Derby
- Sport in Gdańsk
