= Gdańsk Derby =

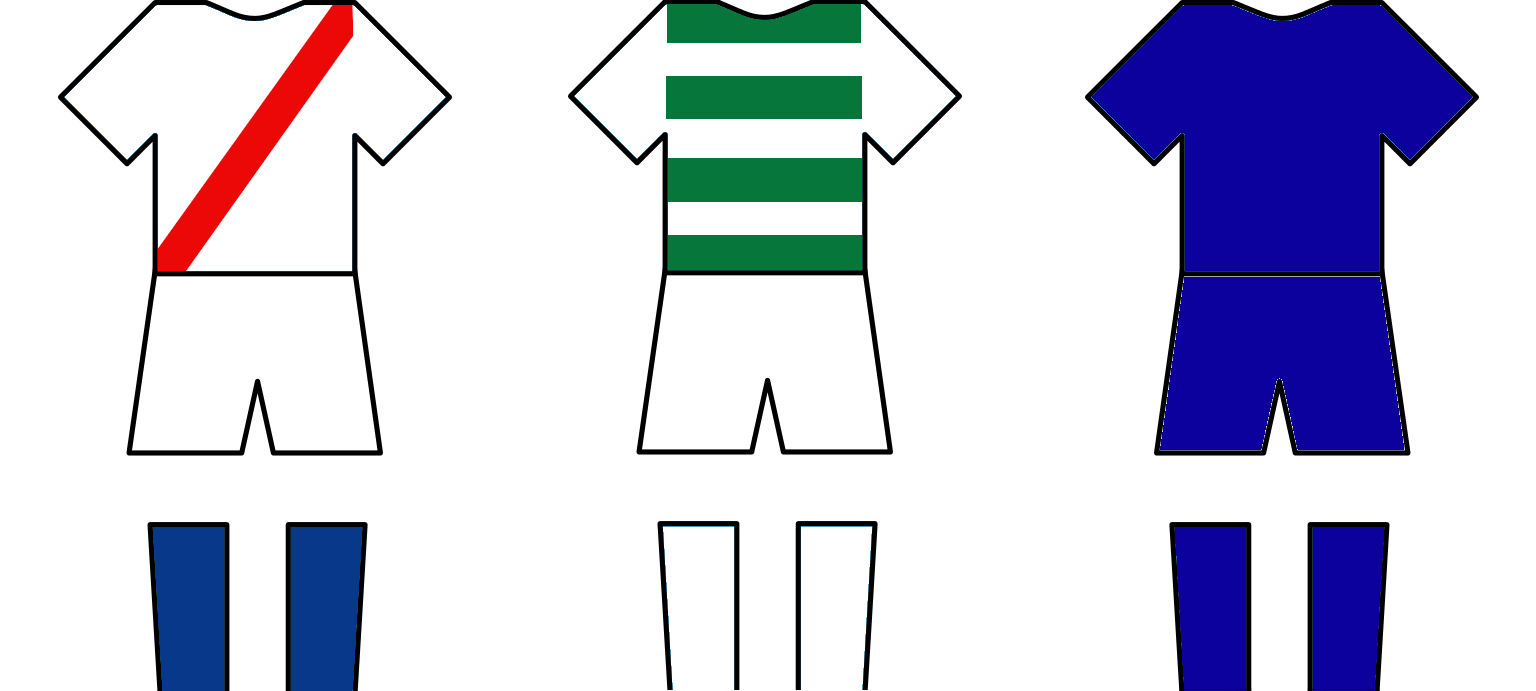
- The typical colours worn by the historic three teams involved in the Gdańsk Derby; Gedania (left), Lechia (center), Stoczniowiec (right)
- Location: Gdańsk, Poland
- Teams: Historic big three Gedania Gdańsk Lechia Gdańsk Stoczniowiec Gdańsk; Additional teams Jaguar Gdańsk Portowiec Gdańsk
- First meeting: 9 September 1945; Lechia Gdańsk 9–1 WKS 16 Dywizji
- Latest meeting: 16 May 2026; Jaguar 2–4 Gedania
- Stadiums: Stadion KS Gedania Gdańsk; Stadion Gdańsk; Stadion Piłkarski; Stadion Jaguar Gdańsk; Boisko Zespołu Szkół Morskich

Statistics
- Total meetings: 147 (known games) - involving; Gedania (71), Lechia (69), Stoczniowiec (66), Portowiec (36), Jaguar (23), MOSiR (10), Milicyjny (4), Flota Nowy Port (4), 16 Dywizji (3), Płomień (3), Pogoń (2), Bałtyk (1), Pocztowy (1), Flotylla (1)
- Most wins: Lechia (41)
- All-time series: Lechia: 41; Gedania: 23; Stoczniowiec: 18; Portowiec: 11; Jaguar: 10; MOSiR: 3 Milicyjny: 1 Flota Nowy Port: 1 Płomień: 1
- Largest victory: WKS 16 Dywizji 0–13 Lechia (30 September 1945)

The "Gdańsk Derby" (Polish: Derby Gdańska) is the name given to describe football matches between teams in Gdańsk, Poland. While this term can be used for any team in Gdańsk historically this term has been used for games involving Gedania Gdańsk, Lechia Gdańsk and Stoczniowiec Gdańsk, historically the three biggest teams in the city of Gdańsk. Lechia Gdańsk is both the most successful team in Gdańsk as well as the most successful team in the derby. Through most of the derby's history, the derby has been played in the second and third divisions, with more recent Gdańsk Derbies being played in the regional divisions. There has never been a Gdańsk Derby in the top division as Lechia Gdańsk are currently the only team from Gdańsk to have ever played in the Ekstraklasa.

== History ==
The first post-war football match in Gdańsk was played by Milicyjny KS Pogoń, playing against Soviet soldiers who were stationed in Gdańsk at the time. The first recorded competitive post-war derby was between Lechia Gdańsk and WKS 16 Dywizji on 9 September 1945 with Lechia winning the game 9-1. It is also the same two teams who hold the record for the biggest win in the derby, with Lechia winning away at WKS 16 Dywizji 13–0 on 30 September 1945. The record for the highest scoring game was contested between Lechia Gdańsk and Płomień Gdańsk on 9 December 1945, with the game finishing as an 11–4 win to Lechia. Lechia also holds the record for documented fixtures, having played in at least 69 Gdańsk Derbies also holding the record for the most wins with 41. Stoczniowiec Gdańsk hold the record for having the documented most draws, while Gedania hold the record for the most documented defeats in the derby.

At least 14 teams have played in the Gdańsk Derby, with the derby having been played more than 100 times since 1945. The majority of the teams who featured in the derby in the 1940s only experienced short spells of playing in the league, most likely due to their sports clubs closing down or merging with other clubs. Gedania Gdańsk, Lechia Gdańsk and Stoczniowiec Gdańsk are seen as the big three teams in the derby due to all three teams being created in 1945 and being among the few teams to not be dissolved which resulted in the teams playing each other often over the following decades. The only other two teams who are now able to play in the Gdańsk Derby are Jaguar Gdańsk and Portowiec Gdańsk, both teams being formed after the other three and having had much lower levels of success in the leagues.

Lechia are considered the biggest team in Gdańsk by some margin. This is due to them being the only team from Gdańsk to play in the Ekstraklasa and having won the Polish Cup twice, most recently in 2019. Stoczniowiec would be seen as Gdańsk's second biggest team due to the number of years they spent in the second and third divisions. In recent years however they have struggled in the lower divisions and have funded themselves as one of the lowest ranked teams in Gdańsk. Gedania have also struggled in recent years and have only seen success outside of the regional leagues during the 1945-51 period of their history. Portowiec has often only played in the regional leagues other than short spells in the third division during the 1970s and 1980s. The youngest team of those listed, Jaguar Gdańsk, has slowly been rising up the leagues and has been involved in many Gdańsk Derby's in recent years.

== The historic big three ==
The "big three" or "main three" teams in the Gdańsk Derby are Gedania Gdańsk, Lechia Gdańsk and Stoczniowiec Gdańsk. All three teams were founded in 1945 after the end of World War II, along with many other sports and football clubs in Gdańsk. While the other teams were eventually closed down, these three teams have kept functioning to the present day. Each team has had its period of success, and times when they could be seen as the biggest team in Gdańsk; Gedania during the early 1950s, Lechia during the 1940s, 1950s, 1980s, and since the turn of the century, and Stoczniowiec in the 1960s and 1970s.

=== Gedania vs Lechia ===
Both teams faced each other often in their early years, with the teams playing 9 times in the league in the first six years of their creations. After 1951, when Lechia were promoted to the top division, the teams did not face each other again until the 2003-04 season. This was due to Lechia having to restart from the lower tiers and passing Gedania on their way back up through the divisions. Since 2004 the teams have not faced each other competitively, with the regional cup game in 2004 currently being the last Gdańsk derby between the two teams. A Gedania and Lechia game has never resulted in a draw with Lechia winning 9 and Gedania winning 3 of the 12 competitive games they have played in.

=== Lechia vs Stoczniowiec ===
Lechia and Stoczniowiec did not play each other until 1967 after Lechia were relegated to the third tier, after which the two teams faced each other in 15 of the next 16 seasons, with the longest spell coming during 10 consecutive seasons of the teams playing in the same division. During this time the Lechia vs Stoczniowiec rivalry was at its highest. In contrast to Lechia and Gedania never drawing, Lechia and Stoczniowiec drew a third of their games against each other. Lechia and Stoczniowiec have not played each other competitively since 1983, a period of time when Lechia saw success winning back to back promotions, getting back to the Ekstraklasa, and winning the Polish Cup while in the third tier, and the Polish SuperCup while also playing in European competitions the following season in the second tier.

Despite the two teams not playing since 1983 their paths did cross again in 1998 when the two teams merged creating Lechia-Polonia Gdańsk. Due to this merger Stoczniowiec dropped down to the fifth tier for the following season, with Lechia having to restart in the sixth tier in 2001 after it was evident that the merger team was dropping down the leagues after successive relegation's. While Lechia are now back in the top division Stoczniowiec have never recovered from their pre-merger times when they were competitive in the second and third tiers.

=== Gedania vs Stoczniowiec ===
After their first meeting in 1952 the two teams started to go in different directions. With Gedania being one of the biggest teams in Gdańsk during the years after their formation, the team started to slip down into the lower divisions, in contrast Stoczniowiec often found themselves moving between the second and third divisions. It wasn't until Stoczniowiec had to restart in the lower divisions did the two teams met regularly. From 2001-2011 the teams met 14 times in the league, with Gedania often edging out the games winning five to Stoczniowiec two. The two teams have not met competitively since 2011.

== Big three clubs head-to-head ==
Comparison of Gedania, Lechia and Stoczniowiec
	Gedania	Lechia	Stoczniowiec
Year of establishment	1945	1945	1945
Highest league finish	7th in II liga (1951)	3rd in Ekstraklasa (1956, 2019)	3rd in II liga (1977)
Highest Polish Cup finish	1/32 finals (1969)	Winners (1983, 2019)	1/2 finals (1976)
Number of seasons in the Ekstraklasa	0	29	0
Ekstraklasa debut	-	20 March 1949	-
Number of seasons in the second tier	2	35	20
Second tier debut	1951	1946	1952
Division for the 2019/20 season	IV liga Pomerania	Ekstraklasa	Liga okręgowa Gdańsk I

== All-time results (the historic big three) ==
=== Gedania vs Lechia ===
Games: 12, Gedania wins: 3, Lechia wins: 9, Draws: 0
Gedania goals: 21, Lechia goals: 43

No.	Date	Home team	Score	Away team	League
1	23 September 1945	Lechia Gdańsk	7–2	Gedania Gdańsk	Qualifiers for A Class
2	14 October 1945	Gedania Gdańsk	2–4	Lechia Gdańsk	Qualifiers for A Class
3	16 May 1946	Gedania Gdańsk	3–0	Lechia Gdańsk	A Class Championships
4	17 November 1946	Gedania Gdańsk	4–2	Lechia Gdańsk	A Class Championships
5	6 June 1948	Gedania Gdańsk	1c5	Lechia Gdańsk	A Class Championships
6	13 June 1948	Gedania Gdańsk	2–7	Lechia Gdańsk	A Class Championships
7	25 April 1949	Lechia Gdańsk	2–1	Gedania Gdańsk	A Class Championships
8	20 May 1951	Lechia Gdańsk	2–1	Gedania Gdańsk	A Class Championships
9	24 June 1951	Gedania Gdańsk	0–4	Lechia Gdańsk	A Class Championships
10	11 October 2003	Lechia Gdańsk	2–1	Gedania Gdańsk	IV liga - grupa pomorska
11	19 May 2004	Gedania Gdańsk	4–3	Lechia Gdańsk	IV liga - grupa pomorska
Cup
1	27 June 2004	Lechia Gdańsk	3–0	Gedania Gdańsk	-

=== Lechia vs Stoczniowiec ===
Games: 31, Lechia wins: 12, Stoczniowiec wins: 7, Draws: 12
Lechia goals: 32, Stoczniowiec goals: 19

No.	Date	Home team	Score	Away team	League
1	20 August 1967	Lechia Gdańsk	1–2	Stoczniowiec Gdańsk	III liga
2	31 March 1968	Stoczniowiec Gdańsk	1–3	Lechia Gdańsk	III liga
3	1 September 1968	Stoczniowiec Gdańsk	1–0	Lechia Gdańsk	III liga
4	13 April 1969	Lechia Gdańsk	0–0	Stoczniowiec Gdańsk	III liga
5	7 September 1969	Stoczniowiec Gdańsk	0–0	Lechia Gdańsk	III liga
6	19 April 1970	Lechia Gdańsk	1–1	Stoczniowiec Gdańsk	III liga
7	29 August 1970	Stoczniowiec Gdańsk	0–0	Lechia Gdańsk	III liga
8	18 April 1971	Lechia Gdańsk	3–2	Stoczniowiec Gdańsk	III liga
9	22 August 1971	Lechia Gdańsk	0–1	Stoczniowiec Gdańsk	II liga
10	9 April 1972	Stoczniowiec Gdańsk	0–1	Lechia Gdańsk	II liga
11	10 October 1973	Stoczniowiec Gdańsk	0–1	Lechia Gdańsk	II liga
12	24 March 1974	Lechia Gdańsk	0–0	Stoczniowiec Gdańsk	II liga
13	25 August 1974	Stoczniowiec Gdańsk	3–1	Lechia Gdańsk	II liga
14	23 March 1975	Lechia Gdańsk	0–1	Stoczniowiec Gdańsk	II liga
15	2 November 1975	Stoczniowiec Gdańsk	0–1	Lechia Gdańsk	II liga
16	15 May 1976	Lechia Gdańsk	2–0	Stoczniowiec Gdańsk	II liga
17	23 October 1976	Stoczniowiec Gdańsk	0–0	Lechia Gdańsk	II liga
18	28 May 1977	Lechia Gdańsk	1–0	Stoczniowiec Gdańsk	II liga
19	17 September 1977	Stoczniowiec Gdańsk	1–2	Lechia Gdańsk	II liga
20	23 April 1978	Lechia Gdańsk	2–0	Stoczniowiec Gdańsk	II liga
21	20 August 1978	Lechia Gdańsk	3–0	Stoczniowiec Gdańsk	II liga
22	14 April 1979	Stoczniowiec Gdańsk	1–0	Lechia Gdańsk	II liga
23	6 October 1979	Lechia Gdańsk	2–1	Stoczniowiec Gdańsk	II liga
24	3 May 1980	Stoczniowiec Gdańsk	1–1	Lechia Gdańsk	II liga
25	13 September 1980	Stoczniowiec Gdańsk	0–0	Lechia Gdańsk	II liga
26	4 April 1981	Lechia Gdańsk	1–2	Stoczniowiec Gdańsk	II liga
27	5 September 1981	Lechia Gdańsk	0–0	Stoczniowiec Gdańsk	II liga
28	3 April 1982	Stoczniowiec Gdańsk	0–0	Lechia Gdańsk	II liga
29	19 September 1982	Lechia Gdańsk	1–1	Stoczniowiec Gdańsk	III liga
30	7 May 1983	Stoczniowiec Gdańsk	0–2	Lechia Gdańsk	III liga
Cup
1	17 June 1976	Lechia Gdańsk	0–0	Stoczniowiec Gdańsk	-

=== Gedania vs Stoczniowiec ===
Games: 20, Gedania wins: 6, Stoczniowiec wins: 5, Draws: 9
Gedania goals: 27, Stoczniowiec goals: 24

No.	Date	Home team	Score	Away team	League
1	1952	Stoczniowiec Gdańsk	4–2	Gedania Gdańsk	II liga
2	1952	Gedania Gdańsk	6–1	Stoczniowiec Gdańsk	II liga
3	1981/82	Gedania Gdańsk	0–0	Stoczniowiec Gdańsk	IV liga - (pomeranian group)
4	1981/82	Stoczniowiec Gdańsk	3–2	Gedania Gdańsk	IV liga - (pomeranian group)
5	1999/2000	Gedania Gdańsk	0–2	Stoczniowiec Gdańsk	IV liga - (pomeranian group)
6	1999/2000	Stoczniowiec Gdańsk	1–1	Gedania Gdańsk	IV liga - (pomeranian group)
7	11 August 2001	Stoczniowiec Gdańsk	1–1	Gedania Gdańsk	IV liga - (pomeranian group)
8	16 March 2002	Gedania Gdańsk	1–0	Stoczniowiec Gdańsk	IV liga - (pomeranian group)
9	20 August 2005	Stoczniowiec Gdańsk	0–0	Gedania Gdańsk	District Class (Group Gdańsk I)
10	1 April 2006	Gedania Gdańsk	1–1	Stoczniowiec Gdańsk	District Class (Group Gdańsk I)
11	19 August 2006	Gedania Gdańsk	0–2	Stoczniowiec Gdańsk	District Class (Group Gdańsk I)
12	31 March 2007	Stoczniowiec Gdańsk	2–2	Gedania Gdańsk	District Class (Group Gdańsk I)
13	10 November 2007	Stoczniowiec Gdańsk	2–1	Gedania Gdańsk	District Class (Group Gdańsk I)
14	31 May 2008	Gedania Gdańsk	1–0	Stoczniowiec Gdańsk	District Class (Group Gdańsk I)
15	20 September 2008	Stoczniowiec Gdańsk	1–1	Gedania Gdańsk	District Class (Group Gdańsk I)
16	2 May 2009	Gedania Gdańsk	0–0	Stoczniowiec Gdańsk	District Class (Group Gdańsk I)
17	26 September 2009	Gedania Gdańsk	2–1	Stoczniowiec Gdańsk	District Class (Group Gdańsk I)
18	8 May 2010	Stoczniowiec Gdańsk	3–3	Gedania Gdańsk	District Class (Group Gdańsk I)
19	21 August 2010	Stoczniowiec Gdańsk	0–1	Gedania Gdańsk	District Class (Group Gdańsk I)
20	19 March 2011	Gedania Gdańsk	2–1	Stoczniowiec Gdańsk	District Class (Group Gdańsk I)

== All time results (other teams) ==
This is a list of games involving the smaller teams of Gdańsk. There is a high possibility that these lists are incomplete, mainly due to the poor record keeping of games in the 1940s and 1950s in the lower leagues at the time, and the difficulty of retrieving information online. All games involving Lechia Gdańsk are known due to the clubs record keeping throughout the years and the ease of accessibility of these results.

The clubs are listed in date order of the first fixture between the two teams.

=== Lechia vs WKS 16 Dywizji ===
Games:3, Lechia wins: 3, WKS 16 Dywizji wins: 0, Draws: 0
Lechia goals: 27, WKS 16 Dywizji goals: 4

No.	Date	Home team	Score	Away team	League
1	9 September 1945	Lechia Gdańsk	9–1	WKS 16 Dywizji	Qualifiers for A Class
2	30 September 1945	WKS 16 Dywizji	0–13	Lechia Gdańsk	Qualifiers for A Class
3	24 November 1946	WKS 16 Dywizji	3–5	Lechia Gdańsk	A Class Championships

=== Lechia vs Milicyjny ===
Games:4, Lechia wins: 3, Milicyjny wins: 1, Draws: 0
Lechia goals: 14, Milicyjny goals: 11

No.	Date	Home team	Score	Away team	League
1	16 September 1945	Milicyjny Gdańsk	3–5	Lechia Gdańsk	Qualifiers for A Class
2	7 October 1945	Lechia Gdańsk	6–1	Milicyjny Gdańsk	Qualifiers for A Class
3	2 December 1945	Milicyjny Gdańsk	2–3	Lechia Gdańsk	A Class Championships
4	18 June 1946	Milicyjny Gdańsk	5–0	Lechia Gdańsk	A Class Championships

=== Lechia vs Flota Nowy Port ===
Games:4, Lechia wins: 2, Flota Nowy Port wins: 1, Draws: 1
Lechia goals: 9, Flota Nowy Port goals: 4

No.	Date	Home team	Score	Away team	League
1	7 November 1945	Flota Nowy Port Gdańsk	3–3	Lechia Gdańsk	A Class Championships
2	13 June 1946	Lechia Gdańsk	0–1	Flota Nowy Port Gdańsk	A Class Championships
3	12 May 1947	Lechia Gdańsk	3–0	Flota Nowy Port Gdańsk	A Class Championships
4	13 May 1947	Flota Nowy Port Gdańsk	0–3	Lechia Gdańsk	A Class Championships

=== Lechia vs Płomień ===
Games:3, Lechia wins: 2, Płomień: 1, Draws: 0
Lechia goals: 26, Płomień goals: 12

No.	Date	Home team	Score	Away team	League
1	9 December 1945	Lechia Gdańsk	11–4	Płomień Gdańsk	A Class Championships
2	29 June 1946	Płomień Gdańsk	8–5	Lechia Gdańsk	A Class Championships
3	1 December 1946	Lechia Gdańsk	10–0	Płomień Gdańsk	A Class Championships

=== Lechia vs Pogoń ===
Games:2, Lechia wins: 2, Pogoń: 0, Draws: 0
Lechia goals: 6, Pogoń goals: 1

No.	Date	Home team	Score	Away team	League
1	27 October 1946	Pogoń Gdańsk	1–4	Lechia Gdańsk	A Class Championships
2	11 May 1947	Lechia Gdańsk	2–0	Pogoń Gdańsk	A Class Championships

=== Lechia vs Bałtyk ===
Games:1, Lechia wins: 1, Bałtyk: 0, Draws: 0
Lechia goals: 12, Bałtyk goals: 0

No.	Date	Home team	Score	Away team	League
1	10 November 1946	Bałtyk Gdańsk	0–12	Lechia Gdańsk	A Class Championships

=== Lechia vs Pocztowy ===
Games:1, Lechia wins: 1, Pocztowy: 0, Draws: 0
Lechia goals: 9, Bałtyk goals: 1

No.	Date	Home team	Score	Away team	League
1	27 May 1948	Lechia Gdańsk	9–1	Pocztowy KS Gdańsk	A Class Championships

=== Lechia vs Portowiec ===
Games: 7, Lechia wins: 5, Portowiec wins: 2, Draws: 0
Lechia goals: 7, Portowiec goals: 4

No.	Date	Home team	Score	Away team	League
1	11 October 1970	Portowiec Gdańsk	0–2	Lechia Gdańsk	III liga
2	29 May 1971	Lechia Gdańsk	1–0	Portowiec Gdańsk	III liga
3	9 October 1982	Portowiec Gdańsk	0–1	Lechia Gdańsk	III liga
4	19 May 1983	Lechia Gdańsk	2–0	Portowiec Gdańsk	III liga
Cup
1	23 June 1971	Portowiec Gdańsk	0–1	Lechia Gdańsk	-
2	28 June 1972	Portowiec Gdańsk	1–0	Lechia Gdańsk	-
3	16 June 1974	Portowiec Gdańsk	3–0	Lechia Gdańsk	-

=== Gedania vs Portowiec ===
Games: 14, Gedania wins: 4, Portowiec wins: 4, Draws: 6
Gedania goals: 21, Portowiec goals: 25

No.	Date	Home team	Score	Away team	League
1	1961/62	Portowiec Gdańsk	1–5	Gedania Gdańsk	III liga
2	1961/62	Gedania Gdańsk	0–3	Portowiec Gdańsk	III liga
3	1972/73	Portowiec Gdańsk	1–1	Gedania Gdańsk	IV liga
4	1972/73	Gedania Gdańsk	0–3	Portowiec Gdańsk	IV liga
5	1973/74	Portowiec Gdańsk	2–1	Gedania Gdańsk	III liga
6	1973/74	Gedania Gdańsk	1–0	Portowiec Gdańsk	III liga
7	1974/75	Portowiec Gdańsk	2–2	Gedania Gdańsk	III liga
8	1974/75	Gedania Gdańsk	0–0	Portowiec Gdańsk	III liga
9	1981/82	Gedania Gdańsk	1–0	Portowiec Gdańsk	IV liga
10	1981/82	Portowiec Gdańsk	6–0	Gedania Gdańsk	IV liga
11	1989/90	Portowiec Gdańsk	1–1	Gedania Gdańsk	IV liga
12	1989/90	Gedania Gdańsk	2–2	Portowiec Gdańsk	IV liga
13	25 October 2014	Portowiec Gdańsk	3–3	Gedania Gdańsk	District Class (Group Gdańsk I)
14	3 June 2015	Gedania Gdańsk	4–1	Portowiec Gdańsk	District Class (Group Gdańsk I)

=== Stoczniowiec vs Portowiec ===
Games: 11, Stoczniowiec wins: 7, Portowiec wins: 3, Draws: 1
Stoczniowiec goals: 41, Portowiec goals: 13

No.	Date	Home team	Score	Away team	League
1	1981/82	Stoczniowiec Gdańsk	0–0	Portowiec Gdańsk	District Class (Group Gdańsk I or II)
2	1981/82	Portowiec Gdańsk	3–1	Stoczniowiec Gdańsk	District Class (Group Gdańsk I or II)
3	28 October 2018	Portowiec Gdańsk	2–1	Stoczniowiec Gdańsk	District Class (Group Gdańsk I or II)
4	2 June 2019	Stoczniowiec Gdańsk	1–2	Portowiec Gdańsk	District Class (Group Gdańsk I or II)
5	14 September 2019	Stoczniowiec Gdańsk	3–0	Portowiec Gdańsk	District Class (Group Gdańsk I or II)
6	20 August 2020	Portowiec Gdańsk	1–5	Stoczniowiec Gdańsk	District Class (Group Gdańsk I or II)
7	3 April 2021	Stoczniowiec Gdańsk	4–0	Portowiec Gdańsk	District Class (Group Gdańsk I or II)
8	2 October 2021	Portowiec Gdańsk	0–8	Stoczniowiec Gdańsk	District Class (Group Gdańsk I or II)
9	30 April 2022	Stoczniowiec Gdańsk	2–1	Portowiec Gdańsk	District Class (Group Gdańsk I or II)
10	11 November 2023	Portowiec Gdańsk	3–8	Stoczniowiec Gdańsk	District Class (Group Gdańsk I or II)
11	8 June 2024	Stoczniowiec Gdańsk	8–1	Portowiec Gdańsk	District Class (Group Gdańsk I or II)

=== Stoczniowiec vs MOSiR ===
Games:2, Stoczniowiec wins: 0, MOSiR wins: 1, Draws: 1
Stoczniowiec goals: 1, MOSiR goals: 3

No.	Date	Home team	Score	Away team	League
1	1981/82	MOSiR Gdańsk	2–0	Stoczniowiec Gdańsk	IV liga (Pomerania)
2	1981/82	Stoczniowiec Gdańsk	1–1	MOSiR Gdańsk	IV liga (Pomerania)

=== Gedania vs MOSiR ===
Games:6, Gedania wins: 2, MOSiR wins: 2, Draws: 2
Gedania goals: 4, MOSiR goals: 4

No.	Date	Home team	Score	Away team	League
1	1981/82	MOSiR Gdańsk	1–0	Gedania Gdańsk	IV liga (Pomerania)
2	1981/82	Gedania Gdańsk	1–0	MOSiR Gdańsk	IV liga (Pomerania)
3	1982/83	MOSiR Gdańsk	0–3	Gedania Gdańsk	IV liga (Pomerania)
4	1982/83	Gedania Gdańsk	0–0	MOSiR Gdańsk	IV liga (Pomerania)
5	1985/86	Gedania Gdańsk	0–0	MOSiR Gdańsk	IV liga (Pomerania)
6	1985/86	MOSiR Gdańsk	3–0	Gedania Gdańsk	IV liga (Pomerania)

=== MOSiR vs Portowiec ===
Games:2, MOSiR wins: 0, Portowiec wins: 2, Draws: 0
Gedania goals: 3, Portowiec goals: 8

No.	Date	Home team	Score	Away team	League
1	1981/82	MOSiR Gdańsk	1–4	Portowiec Gdańsk	IV liga (Pomerania)
2	1981/82	Portowiec Gdańsk	4–2	MOSiR Gdańsk	IV liga (Pomerania)

=== Lechia vs Flotylla ===
Games:1, Lechia wins: 1, Flotylla: 0, Draws: 0
Lechia goals: 2, Flotylla goals: 0

No.	Date	Home team	Score	Away team	League
Cup
1	19 April 2003	Lechia Gdańsk	2–0	Flotylla Gdańsk	-

=== Jaguar vs Portowiec ===
Games: 2, Jaguar wins: 2, Portowiec wins: 0, Draws: 0
Jaguar goals: 4, Portowiec goals: 2

No.	Date	Home team	Score	Away team	League
1	29 October 2011	Portowiec Gdańsk	1–2	Jaguar Gdańsk	Klasa A (Group Gdańsk II)
2	3 June 2012	Jaguar Gdańsk	2–1	Portowiec Gdańsk	Klasa A (Group Gdańsk II)

=== Gedania vs Jaguar ===
Games: 19, Gedania wins: 9, Jaguar wins: 7, Draws: 3
Gedania goals: 32, Jaguar goals: 28

No.	Date	Home team	Score	Away team	League
1	27 October 2012	Gedania Gdańsk	1–1	Jaguar Gdańsk	District Class (Group Gdańsk I)
2	25 May 2013	Jaguar Gdańsk	1–3	Gedania Gdańsk	District Class (Group Gdańsk I)
3	14 September 2013	Gedania Gdańsk	2–3	Jaguar Gdańsk	District Class (Group Gdańsk I)
4	1 May 2014	Jaguar Gdańsk	1–4	Gedania Gdańsk	District Class (Group Gdańsk I)
5	17 October 2015	Jaguar Gdańsk	1–1	Gedania Gdańsk	IV liga (pomeranian group)
6	12 May 2016	Gedania Gdańsk	2–3	Jaguar Gdańsk	IV liga (pomeranian group)
7	10 September 2016	Gedania Gdańsk	0–2	Jaguar Gdańsk	IV liga (pomeranian group)
8	12 April 2017	Jaguar Gdańsk	5–2	Gedania Gdańsk	IV liga (pomeranian group)
9	18 November 2017	Gedania Gdańsk	1–0	Jaguar Gdańsk	IV liga (pomeranian group)
10	20 June 2018	Jaguar Gdańsk	1–0	Gedania Gdańsk	IV liga (pomeranian group)
11	20 October 2018	Jaguar Gdańsk	0–1	Gedania Gdańsk	IV liga (pomeranian group)
12	24 April 2019	Gedania Gdańsk	2–0	Jaguar Gdańsk	IV liga (pomeranian group)
13	26 October 2019	Jaguar Gdańsk	1–1	Gedania Gdańsk	IV liga (pomeranian group)
14	7 November 2020	Gedania Gdańsk	1–5	Jaguar Gdańsk	IV liga (pomeranian group)
15	12 June 2021	Gedania Gdańsk	1–2	Jaguar Gdańsk	IV liga (pomeranian group)
16	13 November 2021	Gedania Gdańsk	3–0	Jaguar Gdańsk	IV liga (pomeranian group)
17	23 April 2022	Gedania Gdańsk	3–0	Jaguar Gdańsk	IV liga (pomeranian group)
18	25 October 2025	Gedania Gdańsk	2–0	Jaguar Gdańsk	IV liga (pomeranian group)
19	16 May 2026	Jaguar Gdańsk	2–4	Gedania Gdańsk	IV liga (pomeranian group)

=== Jaguar vs Stoczniowiec ===
Games: 2, Jaguar wins: 1, Stoczniowiec wins: 0, Draws: 1
Jaguar goals: 3, Stoczniowiec goals: 0

No.	Date	Home team	Score	Away team	League
1	9 August 2014	Jaguar Gdańsk	3–0	Stoczniowiec Gdańsk	IV liga (pomeranian group)
2	8 March 2015	Stoczniowiec Gdańsk	0–0	Jaguar Gdańsk	IV liga (pomeranian group)

=== Lechia II vs Rivals ===
(the Lechia II team have been included due to the team being competitive in regional divisions and the main team likely to not play a derby game in the immediate future)

Games: 18, Lechia II wins: 11, Draws: 5, Defeats: 2
Lechia II goals: 51, goals conceded: 22

No.	Date	Home team	Score	Away team	League
1	8 October 2006	Lechia II Gdańsk	7–0	Gedania Gdańsk	District Class (Group Gdańsk I)
2	14 October 2006	Stoczniowiec Gdańsk	0–6	Lechia II Gdańsk	District Class (Group Gdańsk I)
3	13 May 2007	Gedania Gdańsk	1–0	Lechia II Gdańsk	District Class (Group Gdańsk I)
4	19 May 2007	Lechia II Gdańsk	4–1	Stoczniowiec Gdańsk	District Class (Group Gdańsk I)
5	30 September 2012	Lechia II Gdańsk	2–1	Stoczniowiec Gdańsk	III liga
6	27 April 2013	Stoczniowiec Gdańsk	2–2	Lechia II Gdańsk	III liga
7	10 August 2013	Stoczniowiec Gdańsk	0–3	Lechia II Gdańsk	III liga
8	16 November 2013	Lechia II Gdańsk	3–2	Stoczniowiec Gdańsk	III liga
9	10 November 2018	Gedania Gdańsk	1–3	Lechia II Gdańsk	IV liga
10	24 November 2018	Jaguar Gdańsk	1–1	Lechia II Gdańsk	IV liga
11	13 June 2019	Lechia II Gdańsk	2–1	Gedania Gdańsk	IV liga
12	23 June 2019	Lechia II Gdańsk	2–2	Gedania Gdańsk	IV liga
13	13 August 2019	Jaguar Gdańsk	0–0	Lechia II Gdańsk	IV liga
14	12 October 2019	Lechia II Gdańsk	3–0	Gedania Gdańsk	IV liga
15	1 August 2020	Gedania Gdańsk	4–2	Lechia II Gdańsk	IV liga
16	20 September 2020	Lechia II Gdańsk	5–5	Jaguar Gdańsk	IV liga
Cup
1	11 April 2012	Stoczniowiec Gdańsk	0–2	Lechia II Gdańsk	-
2	14 October 2015	Jaguar Gdańsk	1–4	Lechia II Gdańsk	-

== Comparison of the other teams ==
Comparison of 16 Dywizji, Bałtyk, Flota Nowy Port, Flotylla, Jaguar, Milicyjny, Płomień, Pocztowy & Portowiec
	16 Dywizji	Bałtyk	Flota N. P.	Flotylla	Jaguar	Milicyjny	Płomień	Pocztowy	Pogoń	Portowiec
Year of establishment	1945	1945	1945	2001	2001	1945	1945	-	1945	1957
Highest league finish	-	-	-	2nd in IV liga (2003)	3rd in IV liga (2021)	-	-	-	-	2nd in III liga (1978)
Number of seasons in the Ekstraklasa	0	0	0	0	0	0	0	0	0	0
Number of seasons in the second tier	1*	1*	2*	0	0	1*	2*	1*	1*	0
Second tier debut	1945	1945	1945	-	-	1945	1945	1948	1946	-
Number of seasons in the third tier	1*	-	-	0	0	1*	-	-	-	8
Third tier debut	1945	-	-	-	-	1945	-	-	-	1970
Division for the 2019/20 season	-	-	-	-	IV liga Pomerania	-	-	-	-	Liga okręgowa Gdańsk I

The teams with an asterisk* shows the minimum amount. For instance it is known 16 Dywizji played in both the second and third tiers, but after 1946 the team's performance is unknown.

== Stats ==
This is a display of all of the known statistics.

All time statistics
	Active teams					Dissolved teams								
	Gedania	Jaguar	Lechia	Portowiec	Stoczniowiec	16 Dywizji	Bałtyk	Flota N. P.	Flotylla	Milicyjny	MOSiR	Płomień	Pocztowy	Pogoń
Games	71	23	69	36	66	3	1	4	1	4	10	3	1	2
Wins	24	10	41	11	19	0	0	1	0	1	3	1	0	0
Draws	20	4	13	7	24	0	0	1	0	0	3	0	0	0
Defeats	27	9	15	18	23	3	1	2	1	3	4	2	1	2
Goals for	107	35	187	52	86	4	0	4	0	11	10	12	1	1
Goals against	125	36	77	76	79	27	12	9	2	14	13	26	9	6
Goal diff.	-18	-1	+110	-25	+8	-23	-12	-5	-2	-3	-3	-14	-8	-5
Biggest win (H)	6-1 vs Stoczniowiec	5-2 vs Gedania	13-0 vs 16 Dywizji	6-0 vs Gedania	8-1 vs Portowiec	-	-	-	-	5-0 vs Lechia	3-0 vs Gedania	8-5 vs Lechia	-	-
Biggest win (A)	5-1 vs Portowiec	5-1 vs Gedania	5-1 vs Gedania	2-1 vs Stoczniowiec	8-0 vs Portowiec	-	-	1-0 vs Lechia	-	-	-	-	-	-
Biggest defeat	6-0 vs Portowiec	4-1 vs Gedania	3-0 vs Gedania & Portowiec	8-0 vs Stoczniowiec	6-1 vs Gedania	13-0 vs Lechia	12-0 vs Lechia	3-0 vs Lechia	2-0 vs Lechia	6-1 vs Lechia	4-1 vs Portowiec	10-0 vs Lechia	9-1 vs Lechia	4-1 vs Lechia

== Current teams ==
=== Names and colours ===
In Polish football it is much more common for a club to change its name than in other countries. Therefore it is important when looking at historic fixtures to remember the clubs previous names as well. Here is a list of the active clubs in Gdańsk and the names they have gone by, and the colours the currently use and have previously used.

Current name	Full name	Colours	Previous names	Previous colours
Gedania Gdańsk	Gdański Klub Sportowy Gedania 1922		no other names	
Jaguar Gdańsk	Klub Piłkarski Jaguar Gdańsk		no other names	no other colours
Lechia Gdańsk	Klub Sportowy Lechia Gdańsk Spółka Akcyjna		Baltia Gdańsk, Budowlani Gdańsk, Olimpia-Lechia Gdańsk, Lechia-Polonia Gdańsk	no other colours
Portowiec Gdańsk	Klub Sportowy Portowiec Gdańsk		MRKS Gdańsk	no other colours
Stoczniowiec Gdańsk	Stoczniowy Klub Sportowy Stoczniowiec Gdańsk		Nit Gdańsk, Stal Gdańsk, Polonia Gdańsk	

=== Club kits ===
Below are the home kits worn by Gedania, Jaguar, Lechia, Portowiec, and Stoczniowiec for the 2021–22 season.

Gedania; Gdańsk	Jaguar; Gdańsk	Lechia; Gdańsk	Portowiec; Gdańsk	Stoczniowiec; Gdańsk

=== Stadia ===
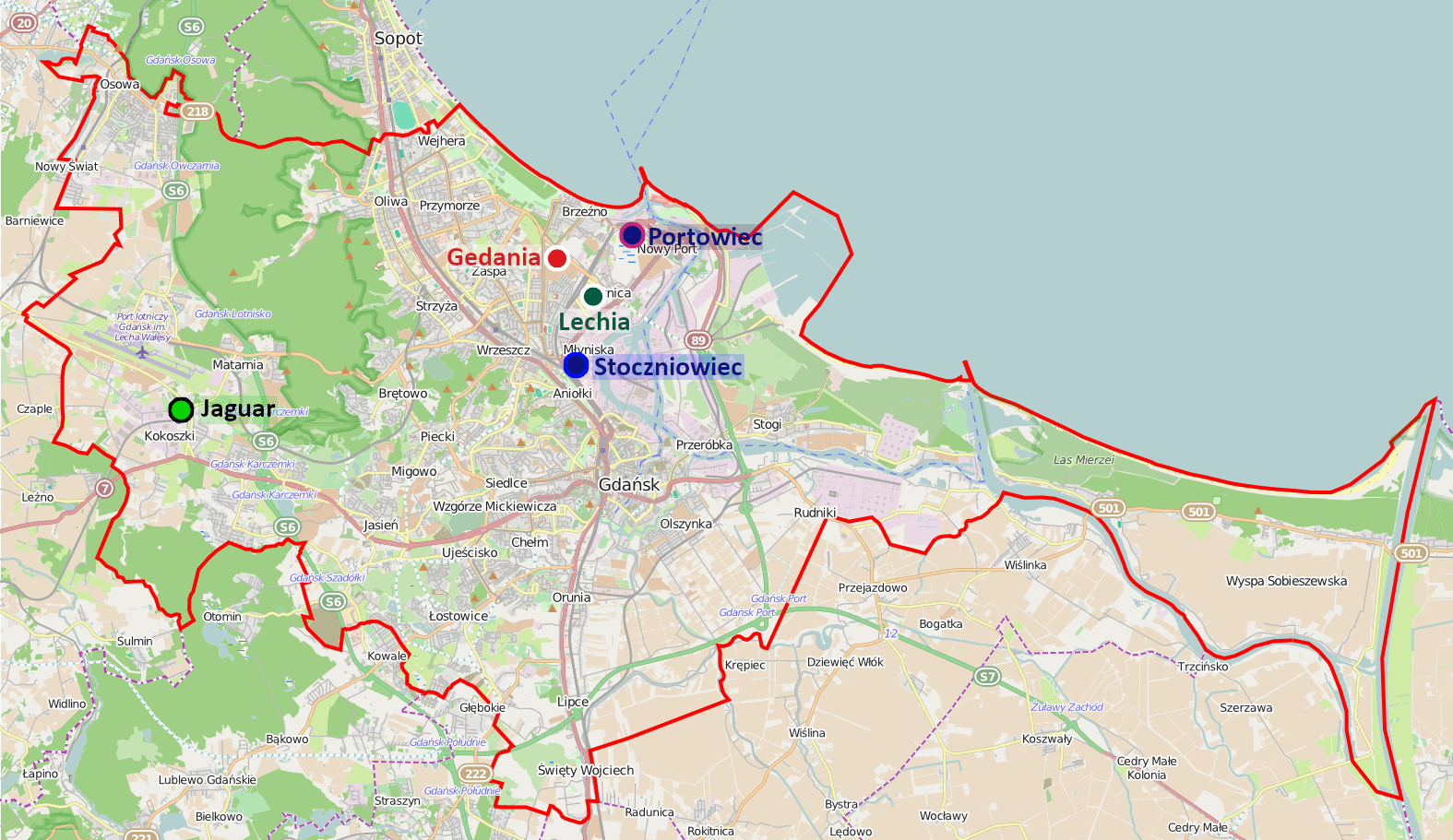
The locations of the 5 teams on top of a map of Gdańsk.

Team	Stadium	Capacity
Gedania Gdańsk	Stadion KS Gedania (Al. Gen. Józefa Hallera 201, 80-416 Gdańsk)	300
Jaguar Gdańsk	Stadion Jaguar Kokoszki (49/5, Budowlanych, 80-980 Gdańsk)	1,000
Lechia Gdańsk	Stadion Gdańsk (ul. Pokoleń Lechii Gdańsk 1, 80-560 Gdańsk)	41,620
Portowiec Gdańsk	Boisko Zespołu Szkół Morskich (Wyzwolenia 8, 80-537 Gdańsk)	300
Stoczniowiec Gdańsk	Stadion Stoczniowca Gdańsk (Marynarki Polskiej 177, 80-868 Gdańsk)	7,500

== See also ==
- Sport in Gdańsk
- Tricity Derby
- Football in Poland
- List of derbies in Poland
