= Hockey Club Gdańsk =

- City: Gdańsk, Poland
- League: Polish 1. Liga
- Founded: 27 March 2012; 14 years ago
- Folded: March 2013; 13 years ago
- Home arena: Hala Olivia
- Colours: White, Navy, Red

Hockey Club Gdańsk (Polish: Klub Hokejowy Gdańsk S.A.) and known as KH Gdańsk was a professional ice hockey team in Gdańsk, Poland. The team formerly played in the Polish 1. Liga, the second level of ice hockey in Poland.

== History ==
The company that owned KH Gdańsk was set up on 6 May 2010, but did not organise a team until 2012. KH Gdańsk, the ice hockey team, were formed in March 2012 after agreeing to take over the debts of Stoczniowiec Gdańsk, who as a result of these financial difficulties had to dissolve after the 2011–12 season. The club played in the 2012–13 1. Liga, finishing 6th out of 7 clubs. At the end of the season the shares of KH Gdańsk were transferred to Stoczniowiec, leading to the reactivation of Stoczniowiec and the folding of KH Gdańsk.

== Honours ==
Competition	Achievement	Seasons / Years
1. Liga	6th place (highest finish)	2012–13
