= Lechia Gdańsk & Śląsk Wrocław (Fan Friendship) =

The Friendship Match
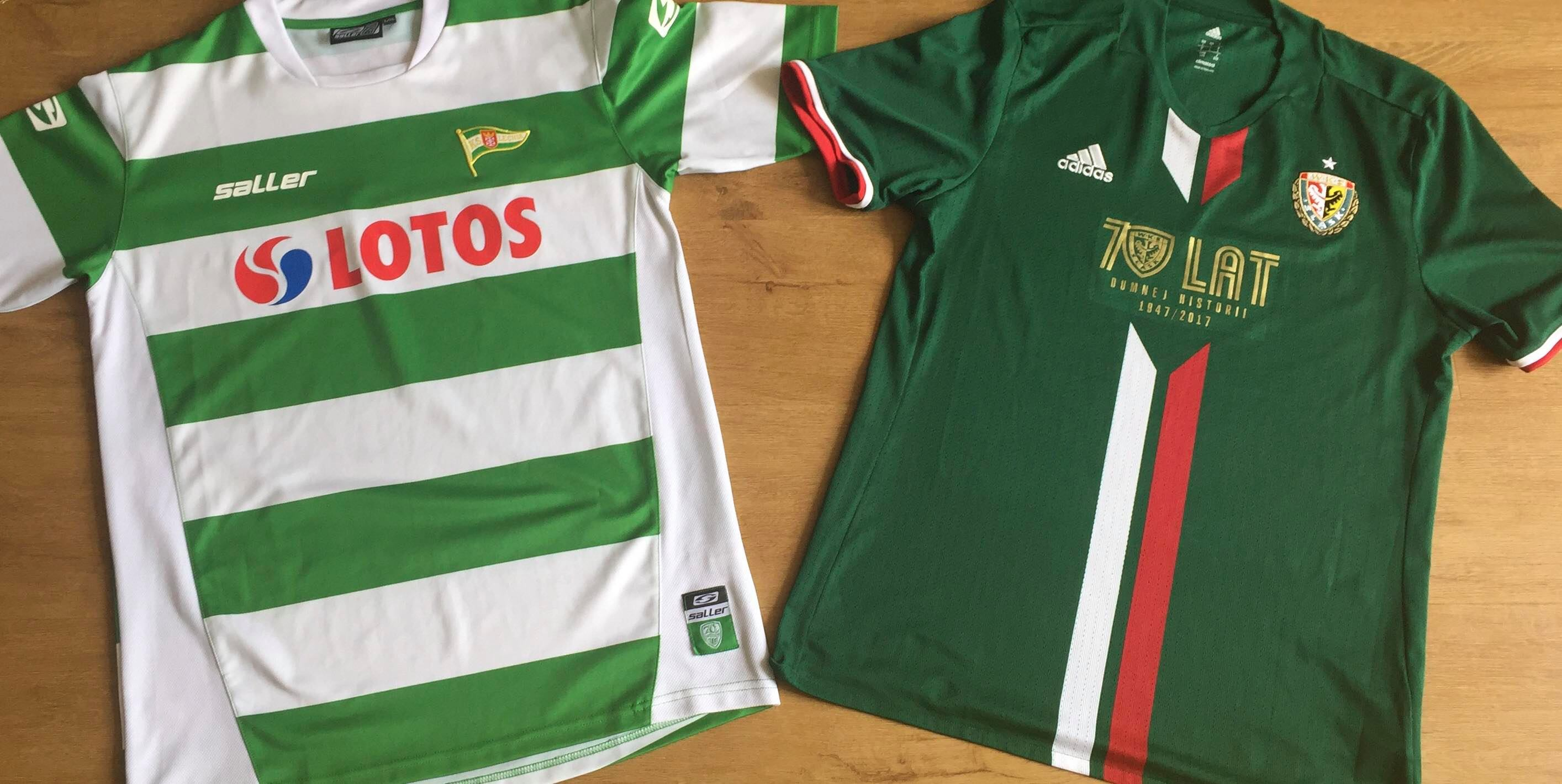
- The 70th anniversary shirts used by Lechia Gdańsk (left) for the 2015–16 season, and Śląsk Wrocław (right) for the 2016–17 season.
- Location: Gdańsk & Wrocław, Poland
- Teams: Lechia Gdańsk; Śląsk Wrocław
- First meeting: 9 November 1952 (first game); Śląsk 1–2 Lechia; 28 November 1982 (after the fan agreement); Lechia 3–0 Śląsk
- Latest meeting: 1 April 2023; Lechia 0–0 Śląsk
- Next meeting: TBA
- Stadiums: Arena Gdańsk; Wrocław Stadium

Statistics
- Total meetings: 63
- All-time series: Lechia: 17; Draw: 22; Śląsk: 24

The Friendship Match (Polish: Mecz Przyjaźni) is a term used by media and both football clubs for games between Polish football clubs Lechia Gdańsk and Śląsk Wrocław. While there have been longer "friendships" (Polish: zgody) in Polish football, such as Polonia Warsaw and Cracovia having relations since the 1920s and officially since the 1960s, their decision to end their friendship agreement in 2017 meant that the agreement between Lechia and Śląsk became the longest current friendship in Polish football. The Friendship has officially been in place since 1977, with the friendship linking back to 1976. The friendship came into fruition in 1976 after Śląsk Wrocław fans traveled to northern Poland to watch Śląsk play against Gwardia Koszalin, a team who has strong links with Arka Gdynia, the main rival of Lechia Gdańsk. During meetings between the two clubs there is no segregation between fans, as in normal football matches, with both sets of fans often being involved with displays of banners and tifo.

== Teams ==
=== Lechia Gdańsk ===
Founded in 1945 in Gdańsk after the expulsion of Poles in Lviv. Throughout their history they have mostly played in the top three tiers. The club had to restart in the lowest divisions after the club created a new club independent club a few years after the Lechia-Polonia Gdańsk merger in 2001. The team have been playing in the Ekstraklasa since 2008. The club have currently won the Polish Cup and the Polish SuperCup twice, winning both cups in 1983 and 2019. The team's highest position in the Ekstraklasa is third which it achieved in 1956 and 2019.

=== Śląsk Wrocław ===
Founded in 1947 in Wrocław, Śląsk have been the more successful of the two teams, playing mostly in the top division since the 1960s. Śląsk last won promotion to the Ekstraklasa in 2008 and have been in the league since. Śląsk have won the Polish championship twice in 1977 and 2012, and finishing in either second or third a further six times. They have won the Polish Cup twice, the Polish SuperCup twice, and the Ekstraklasa Cup once.

== Three Kings of Great Cities ==
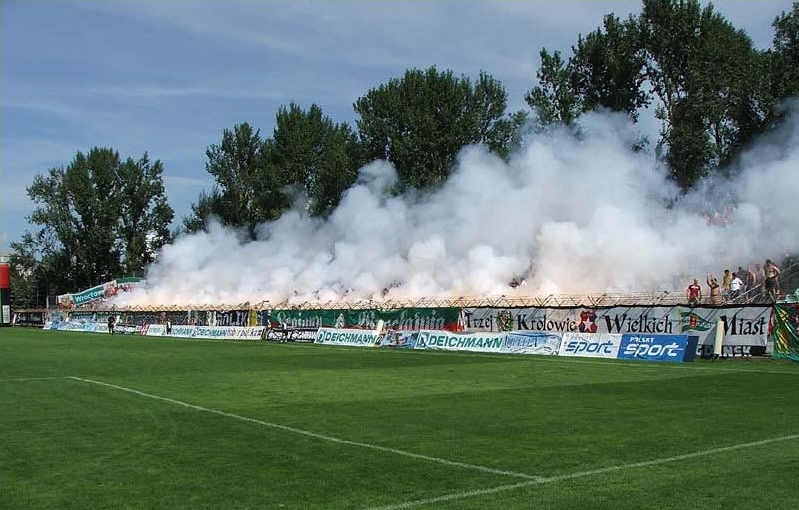
Śląsk fans in 2003. The "Trzej Królowie Wielkich Miast" banner can be seen on the right

The Three Kings of Great Cities alliance (Polish: Trzej Królowie Wielkich Miast) was created in 1994 when Wisła Kraków formed an agreement with Śląsk Wrocław. Lechia and Wisła already had an agreement which dated back to 1973, with the two teams splitting from that agreement at least once. The friendship between the three teams was created to combat the large "The Great Triad" (Polish: Wielka Triada), the alliance between Arka Gdynia, Cracovia and Lech Poznań. The alliance ended in 2016 with Wisła Kraków intending to form a friendship with Ruch Chorzów. This upset both Lechia and Śląsk fans as fans of Ruch Chorzów and Widzew Łódź were involved in the murder of a Śląsk fan in 2003. The main Lechia Gdańsk fan group posted that the decision for Wisła to form a friendship with Ruch was unacceptable for the fans of Lechia, and that the friendship was to be terminated. The main Śląsk Wrocław fan group posted a similar response the following day officially ending the TKWM alliance.

== The Friendship Match ==
Games before 1977 were normal fixtures between the two clubs. Those from 1977 are from when the fans of both clubs agreed a friendship, with the modern term of these games being called "Mecz Przyjaźni", The Friendship Match.

Key

Lechia wins	Draws	Śląsk wins	Friendship matches

=== League ===
No.	Date	Home team	Score	Away team	League
1	18 August 1963	Lechia Gdańsk	0–2	Śląsk Wrocław	II liga
2	22 March 1964	Śląsk Wrocław	2–0	Lechia Gdańsk	II liga
3	7 October 1972	Lechia Gdańsk	0–0	Śląsk Wrocław	II liga
4	13 May 1973	Śląsk Wrocław	3–1	Lechia Gdańsk	II liga
5	24 November 1984	Śląsk Wrocław	2–0	Lechia Gdańsk	I liga
6	23 June 1985	Lechia Gdańsk	3–2	Śląsk Wrocław	I liga
7	17 August 1985	Lechia Gdańsk	4–4	Śląsk Wrocław	I liga
8	8 March 1986	Śląsk Wrocław	1–1	Lechia Gdańsk	I liga
9	28 September 1986	Śląsk Wrocław	2–1	Lechia Gdańsk	I liga
10	2 May 1987	Lechia Gdańsk	1–0	Śląsk Wrocław	I liga
11	26 August 1987	Lechia Gdańsk	1–0	Śląsk Wrocław	I liga
12	2 April 1988	Śląsk Wrocław	1–0	Lechia Gdańsk	I liga
13	21 August 1993	Śląsk Wrocław	2–2	Lechia Gdańsk	II liga (Western gr.)
14	9 April 1994	Lechia Gdańsk	0–0	Śląsk Wrocław	II liga (Western gr.)
15	5 November 1994	Śląsk Wrocław	6–0	Lechia Gdańsk	II liga (Western gr.)
16	3 June 1995	Lechia Gdańsk	0–1	Śląsk Wrocław	II liga (Western gr.)
17	29 June 1995	Olimpia-Lechia Gdańsk	2–1	Śląsk Wrocław	I liga
18	3 April 1996	Śląsk Wrocław	1–1	Olimpia-Lechia Gdańsk	I liga
19	8 August 1998	Lechia-Polonia Gdańsk	2–1	Śląsk Wrocław	II liga (Western gr.)
20	21 March 1999	Śląsk Wrocław	3–0	Lechia-Polonia Gdańsk	II liga (Western gr.)
21	15 August 1999	Śląsk Wrocław	5–1	Lechia-Polonia Gdańsk	II liga
22	29 March 2000	Lechia-Polonia Gdańsk	1–0	Śląsk Wrocław	II liga
23	4 September 2005	Lechia Gdańsk	1–2	Śląsk Wrocław	II liga
24	5 April 2006	Śląsk Wrocław	0–0	Lechia Gdańsk	II liga
25	9 September 2006	Śląsk Wrocław	1–1	Lechia Gdańsk	II liga
26	21 April 2007	Lechia Gdańsk	0–0	Śląsk Wrocław	II liga
27	19 October 2007	Lechia Gdańsk	3–1	Śląsk Wrocław	II liga
28	21 May 2008	Śląsk Wrocław	2–0	Lechia Gdańsk	II liga
29	9 August 2008	Śląsk Wrocław	1–1	Lechia Gdańsk	Ekstraklasa
30	28 February 2009	Lechia Gdańsk	1–1	Śląsk Wrocław	Ekstraklasa
31	29 August 2009	Lechia Gdańsk	1–1	Śląsk Wrocław	Ekstraklasa
32	13 March 2010	Śląsk Wrocław	1–2	Lechia Gdańsk	Ekstraklasa
33	28 August 2010	Lechia Gdańsk	2–0	Śląsk Wrocław	Ekstraklasa
34	19 March 2011	Śląsk Wrocław	2–1	Lechia Gdańsk	Ekstraklasa
35	28 October 2011	Śląsk Wrocław	1–0	Lechia Gdańsk	Ekstraklasa
36	22 April 2012	Lechia Gdańsk	1–1	Śląsk Wrocław	Ekstraklasa
37	21 October 2012	Lechia Gdańsk	2–3	Śląsk Wrocław	Ekstraklasa
38	21 April 2013	Śląsk Wrocław	1–1	Lechia Gdańsk	Ekstraklasa
39	3 November 2013	Lechia Gdańsk	1–2	Śląsk Wrocław	Ekstraklasa
40	12 April 2014	Śląsk Wrocław	1–0	Lechia Gdańsk	Ekstraklasa
41	25 October 2014	Lechia Gdańsk	1–4	Śląsk Wrocław	Ekstraklasa
42	18 April 2015	Śląsk Wrocław	3–0	Lechia Gdańsk	Ekstraklasa
43	30 May 2015	Śląsk Wrocław	1–0	Lechia Gdańsk	Ekstraklasa
44	9 August 2015	Śląsk Wrocław	0–0	Lechia Gdańsk	Ekstraklasa
45	6 December 2015	Lechia Gdańsk	1–0	Śląsk Wrocław	Ekstraklasa
46	6 August 2016	Śląsk Wrocław	0–0	Lechia Gdańsk	Ekstraklasa
47	9 December 2016	Lechia Gdańsk	3–0	Śląsk Wrocław	Ekstraklasa
48	28 July 2017	Śląsk Wrocław	3–2	Lechia Gdańsk	Ekstraklasa
49	1 December 2017	Lechia Gdańsk	3–1	Śląsk Wrocław	Ekstraklasa
50	30 April 2018	Śląsk Wrocław	3–1	Lechia Gdańsk	Ekstraklasa
51	27 July 2018	Lechia Gdańsk	1–1	Śląsk Wrocław	Ekstraklasa
52	30 November 2018	Śląsk Wrocław	0–2	Lechia Gdańsk	Ekstraklasa
53	24 August 2019	Lechia Gdańsk	1–1	Śląsk Wrocław	Ekstraklasa
54	7 February 2020	Śląsk Wrocław	2–2	Lechia Gdańsk	Ekstraklasa
55	19 July 2020	Śląsk Wrocław	1–2	Lechia Gdańsk	Ekstraklasa
56	20 November 2020	Lechia Gdańsk	3–2	Śląsk Wrocław	Ekstraklasa
57	10 April 2021	Śląsk Wrocław	1–1	Lechia Gdańsk	Ekstraklasa
58	8 August 2021	Śląsk Wrocław	1–1	Lechia Gdańsk	Ekstraklasa
59	5 February 2022	Lechia Gdańsk	2–0	Śląsk Wrocław	Ekstraklasa
60	10 September 2022	Śląsk Wrocław	2–1	Lechia Gdańsk	Ekstraklasa
61	1 April 2023	Lechia Gdańsk	0–0	Śląsk Wrocław	Ekstraklasa

=== Cup Competitions ===
No.	Date	Home team	Score	Away team	Cup
1	9 November 1952	Śląsk Wrocław	1–2	Lechia Gdańsk	Polish Cup
2	28 November 1982	Lechia Gdańsk	3–0	Śląsk Wrocław	Polish Cup

== Players & Managers ==
=== Players ===
There have been a few players who have played for both Lechia Gdańsk and Śląsk Wrocław, with the majority of those playing for both clubs after the agreement which was made in 1977.

- Bolesław Błaszczyk – Lechia (1980–1982) & Śląsk (1985)
- Tomasz Borowiec – Lechia (2000 (Note: Played for Lechia-Polonia Gdańsk)) & Śląsk (1999)
- Piotr Bubiłek – Lechia (2000) & Śląsk (2001)
- Michał Chrapek – Lechia (2015–2017) & Śląsk (2017–2020)
- Marcin Ciliński – Lechia (1995–1996 (Note: Played for Olimpia-Lechia Gdańsk)) & Śląsk (1997–1998)
- Jan Erlich – Lechia (1978–1981) & Śląsk (1974–1978)
- Piotr Jacyna – Lechia (2000) & Śląsk (1995)
- Marcin Janus – Lechia (1995, 2005–2006) & Śląsk (1999–2001)
- Jerzy Kasalik – Lechia (1975–1976) & Śląsk (1969–1970)
- Jakub Kosecki – Lechia (2011–2012) & Śląsk (2017–2018)
- Aleksandar Kovačević – Lechia (2015–2017) & Śląsk (2017)
- Kamil Kowalczyk – Lechia (1995–96, 1996) & Śląsk (1994)
- Maciej Kowalczyk – Lechia (2008–2009) & Śląsk (2000–2001)
- Grzegorz Krysiak – Lechia (2000) & Śląsk (1999)
- Mateusz Lewandowski – Lechia (2017–2019) & Śląsk (2017, 2018)
- Mateusz Machaj – Lechia (2011–2013) & Śląsk (2014–2016)
- Michał Mak – Lechia (2015–2019) & Śląsk (2017–2018)
- Sebastian Mila – Lechia (1997–1998, 1998–2001, 2015–2018) & Śląsk (2008–2015)
- Tomasz Moskal – Lechia (2000) & Śląsk (1994–1997)
- Flávio Paixão – Lechia (2016–2023) & Śląsk (2014–2016)
- Marco Paixão – Lechia (2016–2018) & Śląsk (2013–2015)
- Jacek Paszulewicz – Lechia (1998) & Śląsk (2001)
- Bartłomiej Pawłowski – Lechia (2014–2017) & Śląsk (2020–2021)
- Wojciech Pawłowski – Lechia (2010–2012) & Śląsk (2014–2015)
- Mirosław Pękala – Lechia (1985–1988) & Śląsk (1977–1984)
- Krzysztof Rusinek – Lechia (1998, 1998–2001, 2004–2006) & Śląsk (2007)
- Krzysztof Sadzawicki – Lechia (1995–1996) & Śląsk (1999–2001)
- Grzegorz Szamotulski – Lechia (1993) & Śląsk (2001)
- Adam Tokarz – Lechia (1973–1974) & Śląsk (1967–1969)
- Tomasz Unton – Lechia (1988–1994, 1995–96) & Śląsk (1997)
- Dariusz Wojciechowski – Lechia (2001) & Śląsk (1996–1997)
- Łukasz Zwoliński – Lechia (2020–2023) & Śląsk (2016–2017)
- Dzidosław Żuberek – Lechia (2000) & Śląsk (1998–1999)
- Mateusz Żukowski – Lechia (2017–2022) & Śląsk (2023–present)

=== Managers ===
Currently there have been three managers who have managed both Lechia Gdańsk and Śląsk Wrocław.

- Zygmunt Czyżewski – Lechia (1945–1946 (Note: While at Lechia he held the role of player-manager)) & Śląsk (1960–1961)
- Wojciech Łazarek – Lechia (1974–1975, 1985–1986) & Śląsk (1998–1999)
- Romuald Szukiełowicz – Lechia (2000 (Note: Managed Lechia-Polonia Gdańsk)) & Śląsk (1989–1991, 1995–1996, 2015–2016)

== See also ==
- Football in Poland
- Lechia Gdańsk
- Śląsk Wrocław
- Football hooliganism in Poland
- List of derbies in Poland
