= Lech Kulwicki =

Polish footballer

Personal information
- Date of birth: 2 November 1951 (age 74)
- Place of birth: Tczew, Poland
- Height: 1.83 m (6 ft 0 in)
- Position: Defender

Youth career
- –1969: Unia Tczew

Senior career*
Years	Team	Apps	(Gls)
1969–1970	Unia Tczew		
1970–1972	Flota Gdynia		
1972–1977	Polonia Gdańsk		
1977–1985	Lechia Gdańsk	193	(6)
1985–1986	Wisła Tczew		
1986–1991	Polonia Sydney		

Managerial career
- Wisła Tczew
- Unia Tczew
- Orła Trąbki Wielkie
- Motławy Suchy Dąb
- * Club domestic league appearances and goals

Lech Kulwicki (born 2 November 1951) is a Polish former professional footballer who played as a defender. He played for five teams in the Pomeranian region, ending his playing career by spending five seasons in Australia.

== Career ==
=== Early years ===
Born in Tczew, Kulwicki started his playing career with the youth sides of local team Unia Tczew. He made his Unia and professional debut on 17 August 1969 in a game against Olimpia Elbląg. After one season with Unia, Kulwicki joined Flota Gdynia for two seasons before joining Polonia Gdańsk, where he spent a total of five seasons. In his first season with Polonia, Kulwicki was part of the team who won promotion to the second division and playing half of the 1976–77 season where the team finished third, and narrowly missed out on promotion to the top division, the club's highest ever finish in the Polish leagues.

=== Lechia Gdańsk ===
In 1977, he moved to Lechia Gdańsk, where he spent his most successful spell of his career. The first five seasons were spent playing in the second division, and during this time Kulwicki played 132 games and scored 5 goals. In 1981–82, Lechia were relegated to the third tier, and saw a resurgence in fortunes. The 1982–83 season saw Lechia winning the III liga and played in every game as Lechia won the Polish Cup for the first time. The following season Lechia won the Polish SuperCup by beating the Polish champions, Lech Poznań 1-0. Later that season, Lechia faced European footballing giants Juventus in a European competition due to the previous season's cup win. Kulwicki was the captain for the away game as Juventus won the two-legged tie 10–2 on aggregate. Lechia also won promotion to the top division that season by winning the II liga for the 1983–84 season. His final season with Lechia was in the I liga, where he made 19 appearances in the top division. In total, he played 213 games and scored 6 goals in all competitions for Lechia Gdańsk.

=== Later years ===
After Lechia, he played a season with Wisła Tczew before spending five years in Australia with Polonia Sydney. After his playing career he returned to Lechia Gdańsk where he became assistant managers for Janusz Kupcewicz, Jerzy Jastrzębowski, and Romuald Szukiełowicz. In 2000, Kulwicki became the assistant manager for Wiesław Wika at Lechia-Polonia Gdańsk for a week. He later went on to become manager of Wisła Tczew, Unia Tczew, Orła Trąbki Wielkie and Motławy Suchy Dąb.

== Personal life ==
Kulwicki is commemorated by a star at the MOSiR Stadium in Gdańsk. The "Avenue of Stars" commemorates the efforts and success of former players and coaches.

== Honours ==
Polonia Gdańsk

- II liga North third place: 1976–77
- III liga, group IV: 1972–73

Lechia Gdańsk

- II liga West: 1983–84
- III liga, group II: 1982–83
- Polish Cup: 1982–83
- Polish Super Cup: 1983

Wisła Tczew

- III liga, group II third-place: 1985–86
