= Saulo (footballer, born 1971) =

Brazilian footballer

Personal information
- Full name: Saulo Pereira de Carvalho
- Date of birth: 29 July 1971 (age 55)
- Place of birth: Brazil
- Height: 1.76 m (5 ft 9 in)
- Position: Midfielder

Senior career*
Years	Team	Apps	(Gls)
1997–1998	ŁKS Łódź	2	(0)
1998	Polonia Gdańsk	23	(1)
1998	Lechia-Polonia Gdańsk	11	(0)
- * Club domestic league appearances and goals

Saulo Pereira de Carvalho (born 29 July 1971) commonly known as Saulo is a Brazilian former professional footballer who played as a midfielder.

== Football ==
Little is known about Saulo's career before he came to Poland in 1997 at the age 26, other than that be had played in the Brazilian leagues. Saulo joined Polish team ŁKS Łódź and made his Ekstraklasa debut against Zagłębie Lubin, playing 74 minutes before being subbed off. His next game, which also proved to be his last for ŁKS, was against Górnik Zabrze, with Saulo being sent off in the 33rd minute. ŁKS Łódź ended up winning the 1997–98 Ekstraklasa, resulting in Saulo being declared a winner of the competition. Saulo next played for Polonia Gdańsk, before joining Lechia-Polonia Gdańsk, a team created by a merger between Polonia Gdańsk and Lechia Gdańsk. Saulo made his Lechia-Polonia debut against another merger team, Polonia-Szombierki Bytom in a 2–1 win. In total, Saulo made 13 appearances for Lechia-Polonia, with 11 of those coming in the league.

== Honours ==
ŁKS Łódź

- Ekstraklasa: 1997–98
