= Austin Hamlet =

Polish footballer

Personal information
- Full name: Austin Hamlet
- Date of birth: 20 January 1979 (age 47)
- Place of birth: Lagos, Nigeria
- Height: 1.78 m (5 ft 10 in)
- Position: Forward

Youth career
- –1997: Rangers International

Senior career*
Years	Team	Apps	(Gls)
1997	Rangers International		
1997–2000	ŁKS Łódź	41	(3)
1998	→ Polonia Gdańsk (loan)		
1998	→ Piotrcovia P. T. (loan)		
1998	→ Lechia-Polonia Gdańsk (loan)	6	(1)
1999	→ Piotrcovia P. T. (loan)		
2000	Stomil Olsztyn	9	(1)
2001	Stal Stalowa Wola		
2001	ŁKS Łódź		
2002	Chojniczanka Chojnice		
2002–2004	Pelikan Łowicz		
- * Club domestic league appearances and goals

Austin Hamlet (born 20 January 1979) is a Nigerian former professional footballer who played as a forward. He spent the majority of his career in Poland.

== Football ==
Hamlet started his career in Nigeria with Rangers International. In 1997, he moved to Poland after being convinced by a friend, and spent the rest of his playing career there. He joined ŁKS Łódź playing a few games in their 1997–98 Ekstraklasa winning season. In total over three years, Hamlet made 36 league appearances and scored 3 goals. While contracted with ŁKS, Hamlet went on loan to three clubs; Piotrcovia Piotrków Trybunalski, Polonia Gdańsk, and Lechia-Polonia Gdańsk. During the summer of 2000, Hamlet joined Stomil Olsztyn in which would be the start in a series of short spells at different clubs. He spent time with Stal Stalowa Wola, returned to ŁKS Łódź, and played for Chojniczanka Chojnice before finishing off his career with Pelikan Łowicz after agreeing to leave the club in January 2004. In 2004 Hamlet had some issues related to his stay in the country. He left Poland and retired from football aged 24. After returning to Nigeria, Hamlet focused on training youth players club academies.

== Honours ==
ŁKS Łódź

- Ekstraklasa: 1997–98
