= Mauro (footballer, born July 1978) =

Brazilian footballer (born 1978)

Personal information
- Full name: Mauro Sérgio da Silva
- Date of birth: 24 July 1978 (age 48)
- Place of birth: Brazil
- Height: 1.84 m (6 ft 0 in)
- Position: Defender

Senior career*
Years	Team	Apps	(Gls)
1995–1996	América Mineiro		
1996	Ponte Preta		
1997	ŁKS Łódź	2	(0)
1998	Polonia Gdańsk	7	(0)
1998	Lechia-Polonia Gdańsk	0	(0)
1998	ŁKS Łódź	0	(0)
1998–1999	Piotrcovia P. T.	13	(2)
1999	Świt Nowy Dwór Mazowiecki	0	(0)
1999–2000	Piotrcovia P. T.		
2001	ŁKS Łódź	5	(0)
2001	Lechia-Polonia Gdańsk	5	(0)
2001–2002	Piotrcovia P. T.		
2004	Pogoń Szczecin	12	(1)
2006	PSM Makassar		
- * Club domestic league appearances and goals

Mauro Sérgio da Silva (born 24 July 1978), often known during his time in Poland as Mauro or Marinho, is a Brazilian footballer who played as a defender. Mauro started his career in his native Brazil, spent the majority of it playing in Poland, and finished it with a short stint in Indonesia.

== Biography ==
Mauro is known to have played with América Mineiro and Ponte Preta in Brazil, before moving to Poland in 1997 joining ŁKS Łódź. His move to Poland was an instant success, and despite only playing twice in the league and moving to another club midway through the season, he was a part of the ŁKS team who won the Polish championships. In January 1998, he joined Polonia Gdańsk in the II liga, making 7 appearances in his 6 months at the club. At the end of the season Polonia were involved in a merger with Lechia Gdańsk creating the new team Lechia-Polonia Gdańsk. Despite being part of the Lechia-Polonia team at the start of the following season he left the club before making a first team appearance and re-joined ŁKS Łódź, but again left shortly after joining due to failing to break back into the first team. For the remainder of the 1998–99 season Mauro played for Piotrcovia Piotrków Trybunalski, but again failed to make himself an important first team player, playing 13 times and scoring 2 goals as the club suffered relegation at the end of the season. Mauro joined Świt Nowy Dwór Mazowiecki at the end of the season, but left the club after two months and after failing to make an appearance to drop down a division and re-join Piotrcovia Piotrków Trybunalski in the III liga. For the start of the 2000–01 he returned to ŁKS for the third time, this time with the club playing in the II liga. He made 5 appearances before moving to Lechia-Polonia Gdańsk in January, and making a further 5 appearances. For the 2001–02 season he played with Piotrcovia Piotrków Trybunalski for a final time. In 2004 he made a surprise return to Poland's top division with Pogoń Szczecin, making 4 appearances during his short spell at the club. In 2006 Mauro moved to Indonesia and played with PSM Makassar before his retirement from football.

In total Mauro made 6 appearances in Poland's top division, but during his 8-year career in Poland he was only able to reach double figures for appearances with Piotrcovia Piotrków Trybunalski, making over 40 appearances in the top two divisions in Poland during this time.

== Honours ==
ŁKS Łódź

- Ekstraklasa: 1997–98

Pogoń Szczecin

- II liga: 2003–04
