= Wiesław Wika =

Polish association football manager

Personal information
- Full name: Wiesław Wika
- Date of birth: 12 September 1947 (age 79)
- Place of birth: Tczew, Poland

Managerial career
- Years: Team
- 2000: Lechia-Polonia Gdańsk

Dr. Wiesław Wika (born 12 September 1947) is a Polish author who focuses on physical education and sports history, and was formerly joint manager of Lechia Gdańsk in 2000.

== Studies ==
Wika graduated from the Marie Skłodowska-Curie school in Tczew. In 1973 he completed his studies at the University of Gdańsk, and in 1975 finished his studies at the Academy of Physical Education in Katowice, studying to become a football coach. After defending his dissertation in 1978, Wika became a Doctor of Humanities. 1984 saw him gain the qualifications to become a first-class coach, and from 1993 has been coaching at a championship class in football. In 1995 Wika graduated as a Sports Manager after his post graduate studies at the Academy of Physical Culture and Sport in Warsaw.

== Football ==
Wika has coached at Wisła Tczew, Unia Tczew, AZS Gdańsk, MOSiR Pruszcz, and GOZPN in Gorzów Wielkopolski, where he also worked as a coordinator. From 1994 to 1995 he was on the board of the Polish Football Association. In 1995 he was elected onto the Board of Polish Managers. In 2000 Wika had a brief spell as joint manager of Lechia Gdańsk with Lech Kulwicki, who at that time were playing under the name of Lechia-Polonia Gdańsk due to a merger of Lechia Gdańsk and Polonia Gdańsk.

== Writing ==
Wika is the author of over 150 publications, and has written the following books;
1995 - Piłka nożna na wybrzeżu Gdańskim (Football on the coast of Gdansk)
2005 - Futbol młodzieżowy na Pomorzu w latach 1945-2005 (Youth football in Pomerania in 1945–2005)
2005 - Z dziejów pomorskiej piłki nożnej (From the history of Pomeranian football)
2005 - Zdobywcy pucharu im. Wacława Kuchara w jego pierwszej edycji (The winners of the cup Wacław Kuchar in their first edition)
2006 - Pierwsze mistrzostwo Polski dla juniorów Lechii Gdańsk (The first Polish championship for Lechia Gdańsk juniors)
2006 - Sport w Kościerzynie : sześćdziesiąt lat Klubu Sportowego "Kaszubia" (Sport in Kościerzyna: sixty years of the "Kashubia" Sports Club)
2007 - Kazimierz Deyna - w sześćdziesiątą rocznicę urodzin (Kazimierz Deyna - on the sixtieth birthday anniversary)
2008 - Kazimierz Deyna jako reprezentant Polski (Kazimierz Deyna as a representative of Poland)
