= Maciej Kudrycki =

Polish footballer (born 1974)

Personal information
- Full name: Maciej Kudrycki
- Date of birth: 15 September 1974 (age 52)
- Place of birth: Białystok, Poland
- Height: 1.90 m (6 ft 3 in)
- Position: Goalkeeper

Youth career
- –1992: Jagiellonia Białystok

Senior career*
Years	Team	Apps	(Gls)
1992–1993	Jagiellonia Białystok II	4	(0)
1993	Jagiellonia Białystok	0	(0)
1993–1994	Włókniarz Białystok	23	(0)
1994–1995	KP Wasilków	21	(0)
1995–1997	Jagiellonia Białystok	41	(0)
1997	ŁKS Łomża	17	(0)
1998	Stomil Olsztyn	0	(0)
1998	AAC Eagles	15	(0)
1999	Lechia-Polonia Gdańsk	12	(0)
2000	Närpes Kraft FF	12	(0)
2000–2001	Jagiellonia Białystok	2	(0)
2001	Łada Biłgoraj	9	(0)
2002	Lewart Lubartów	17	(0)
2002	Wigry Suwałki	17	(0)
2003	Supraślanka Supraśl	6	(0)
2003	Okęcie Warsaw	6	(0)
2004–2005	Jagiellonia Białystok II	25	(1)
2006	Syrianska	4	(0)
2006	Supraślanka Supraśl		
2007	ŁKS Łomża	11	(0)
2008–2009	Jagiellonia Białystok	1	(0)
2010–2011	BKS Jagiellonia Białystok		
2013–2017	Jagiellonia Białystok II	6	(0)
2019	MOSP Białystok	1	(0)
2023	KS Grabówka	1	(0)
Total		251	(1)
- * Club domestic league appearances and goals

Maciej Kudrycki (born 15 September 1974) is a Polish former professional footballer who played as a goalkeeper. Skrzyński spent the majority of his professional playing career playing between the second and fourth divisions, making one appearance in the Ekstraklasa with Jagiellonia Białystok. Kudrycki's playing career spanned 25 years saw him playing for 16 different teams over 23 different spells, including seven spells with the Jagiellonia first and second teams. Kudrycki's career saw him playing in Poland, Finland, Sweden, and the US.

== Biography ==
=== Early years ===
Kudrycki was born in Białystok and started playing football with his local club Jagiellonia Białystok. While in the Jagiellonia youth teams Kudrycki was a part of the team that won the Polish Junior Championship in 1992. For the 1992–93 season, Kudrycki played with the Jagiellonia Białystok II team in the III liga, and after making four appearances over the course of the season, he joined the first team the season after, but after a few weeks of failing to make an appearance in the league a move elsewhere was sorted out for the player. He joined Włókniarz Białystok for the 1994–95 season and KP Wasilków for the 1995–96 season, with moves possibly being a loan deals. With Włókniarz he made 23 appearances, and with Wasilków he made 21 appearances. After two seasons away, Kudrycki returned to Jagiellonia and broke into the first team for the first time. In his first season as a regular with Jagiellonia, the team suffered relegation to the III liga. Kudrycki stayed with the team for the following season, again being a starter, but with the team failing to succure an immediate return to the II liga, Kudrycki left to join ŁKS Łomża. After only six months with ŁKS Łomża, he caught the attention of I liga side Stomil Olsztyn, with Kudrycki joining the top division side in early 1998.

=== Short term deals and moves abroad ===
While at Stomil Olsztyn, Kudrycki found himself in competition with the second choice goalkeeper as to who would make it onto the bench for the team. Due to this, Kudrycki failed to make a top flight appearance with Stomil, and after only six months of joining, he left to play for AAC Eagles in the US. This move appeared to cause a domino like affect in Kudrycki's career with the player not spending longer than one season with a club for the next eight years. After six months in the US, he joined Lechia-Polonia Gdańsk, making his Lechia-Polonia debut on 6 March 1999 against Polonia-Szombierki Bytom. He made 12 appearances in the II liga with Lechia-Polonia, moving during the winter break to play with Närpes Kraft FF in Finland. He made 12 appearances in Finland, returning in the summer for his second spell at Jagiellonia Białystok for the following season. He made only two appearances for the club, leaving at the conclusion of the season and going on to have six-month spells with Łada Biłgoraj, Lewart Lubartów, Wigry Suwałki, Supraślanka Supraśl, and Okęcie Warsaw, returning once again to Jagiellonia in 2004, this time to play with the second team in the fourth tier. This move provided some stability for Kudrycki, with the player staying with Jagiellonia II for 24 months, his longest spell at a single club since playing for Jagiellonia between 1995 and 1997. He made 25 appearances in the league with the team during this time, also scoring one goal for the club, but left the club to join Swedish side Syrianska in 2006. He made only 4 appearances in Sweden before a return to Poland.

=== Later career ===
Once returning to Poland he played with Supraślanka Supraśl and ŁKS Łomża, returning once again to his boyhood club Jagiellonia Białystok, this time with Jagiellonia playing in the Ekstraklasa, the reformatted top division in Poland. He was contracted as Jagiellonia's second choice goalkeeper, but it was during this final spell with the club that he made his first, and only appearance in the top division, on 19 April 2008 coming on to replace the first choice goalkeeper in the 12th minute during Jagiellonia's 5–2 defeat against Zagłębie Lubin. This was the final professional appearance of his career, as Kudrycki became a youth-team goalkeeping coach at the club after his contract expired in 2009. Despite being a coach, Kudrycki still played in the lower divisions, initially with amateur club BKS Jagiellonia Białystok between 2010–11 and as emergency cover for the Jagiellonia II team between 2013 and 2017, focusing fully on coaching after 2017.
