= Dariusz Czykier =

Polish footballer

Personal information
- Date of birth: 21 February 1966 (age 60)
- Place of birth: Białystok, Poland
- Height: 1.81 m (5 ft 11 in)
- Position: Midfielder

Youth career
- Gwardia Białystok
- Jagiellonia Białystok

Senior career*
Years	Team	Apps	(Gls)
1982–1989	Jagiellonia Białystok	126	(22)
1990	Fala Kazuń		
1990–1993	Legia Warsaw	101	(17)
1993–1994	Radomiak Radom		
1994–1996	Jagiellonia Białystok	42	(5)
1996–2000	Legia Warsaw	71	(8)
1999	→ Zagłębie Lubin (loan)	4	(0)
2000	Jagiellonia Białystok	32	(10)
2001	Wigry Suwałki	21	(0)
2001–2002	Jagiellonia Białystok	20	(0)
2002–2008	Supraślanka Supraśl		
2009	BKS Jagiellonia Białystok		

Managerial career
- 2005–2007: Supraślanka Supraśl (player-manager)
- 2007–2009: Jagiellonia Białystok (assistant)
- 2008: Jagiellonia Białystok (caretaker)
- 2011–2012: Wigry Suwałki (assistant)
- 2012–2013: Wigry Suwałki U19
- 2013–2014: Wigry Suwałki (assistant)
- * Club domestic league appearances and goals

Dariusz Czykier (born 21 February 1966) is a Polish former professional footballer who played as a midfielder.

== Honours ==
Legia Warsaw

- Polish Cup: 1989–90, 1996–97
- Polish Super Cup: 1997
