= Cuch =

Cuch (Polish pronunciation: [tsux]) is a surname. Notable people with the surname include:

- Christian Cuch (1943–2014), French cyclist
- Jacek Cuch (born 1973), Polish footballer
- Tadeusz Cuch (born 1945), Polish sprinter
