= Sérgio Batata =

Polish footballer

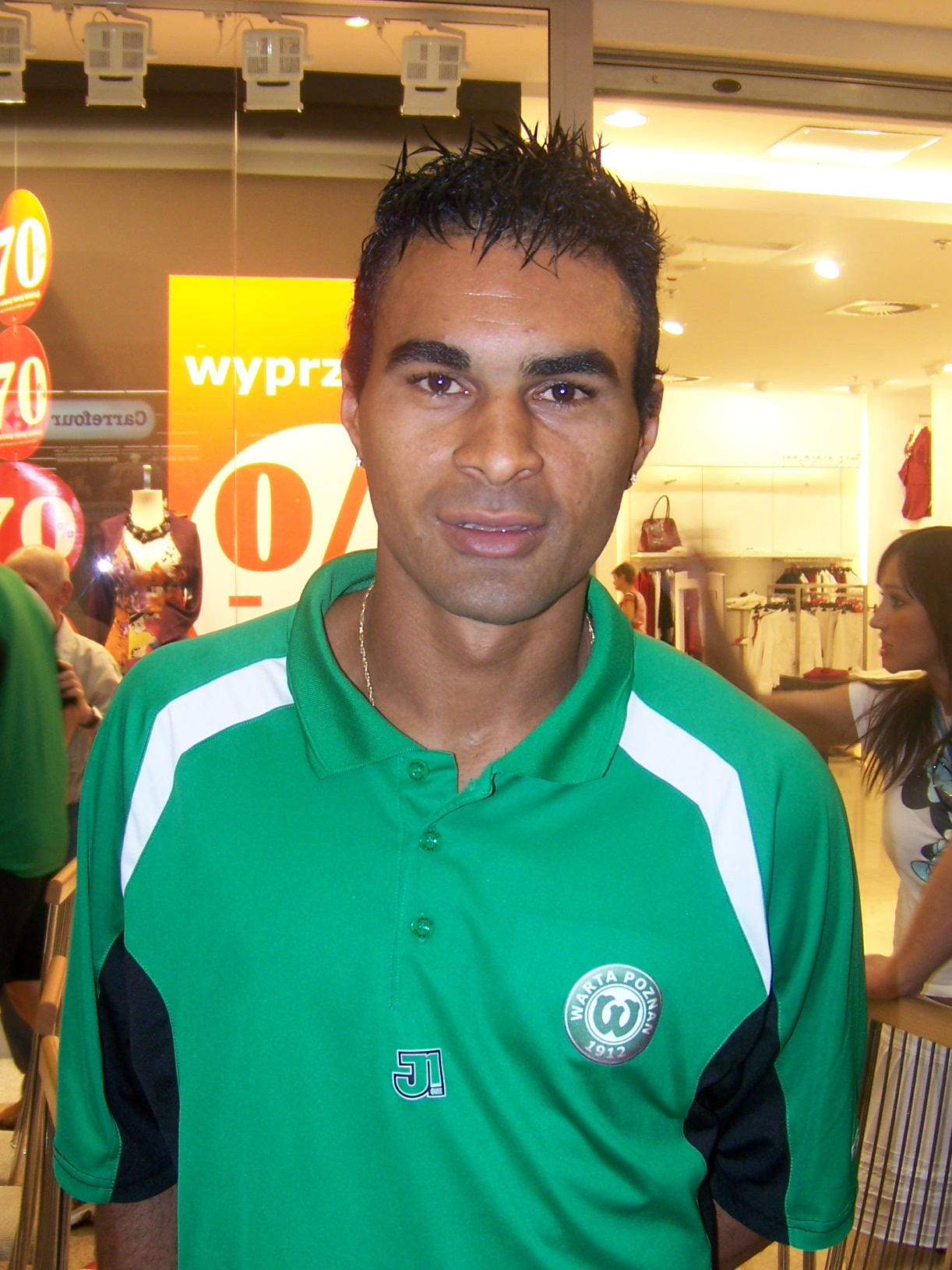
- Sérgio Batata in 2008.

Personal information
- Full name: Sérgio Leandro Seixas Santos
- Date of birth: 23 March 1979 (age 47)
- Place of birth: Montes Claros, Brazil
- Height: 1.81 m (5 ft 11 in)
- Positions: Defender; midfielder

Team information
- Current team: Luciążanka Przygłów
- Number: 10

Youth career
- Clube Atlético Mineiro

Senior career*
Years	Team	Apps	(Gls)
- Clube Atlético Mineiro
1996	Cruzeiro		
1997	ŁKS Łódź	2	(0)
1997	Piotrcovia		
1998	ŁKS Łódź	20	(0)
1998	Polonia Gdańsk	10	(0)
1998	Lechia-Polonia Gdańsk	7	(1)
1998–2000	ŁKS Łódź	41	(1)
2000	GKS Katowice	14	(0)
2001	Pogoń Szczecin	6	(0)
2001	KSZO Ostrowiec Świętokrzyski	7	(0)
2002	TuS Koblenz	4	(3)
2002	Widzew Łódź	14	(5)
2003	Piotrcovia	16	(7)
2003–2006	Pogoń Szczecin	59	(12)
2007	Grêmio Esportivo Brasil		
2007–2008	Dyskobolia Grodzisk Wlkp.	5	(0)
2008–2009	Warta Poznań	27	(5)
2009	Stal Niewiadów	15	(3)
2010	Zawisza Bydgoszcz	13	(1)
2010	Kotwica Kołobrzeg	15	(3)
2011–2012	Motor Lublin	45	(3)
2012–2013	Chełmianka Chełm	41	(2)
2014–2017	Polonia Piotrków Trybunalski		
2019–	Luciążanka Przygłów	92	(75)
- * Club domestic league appearances and goals as of 10:11, 24 June 2025 (UTC)

Sérgio Leandro Seixas Santos (Portuguese pronunciation: [ˈsɛʁʒju leˈɐ̃dɾu ˈsejʃɐs ˈsɐ̃tus]; Polish: [ˈsɛrʐjɔ lɛˈandrɔ ˈsɛjʂas ˈsantɔs] born 23 March 1979) known as Sérgio Batata or just Batata (Portuguese: [baˈtatɐ], Polish: [baˈtata]) is a Brazilian-born Polish professional footballer who plays as a defender or midfielder for Polish Klasa B club Luciążanka Przygłów.

== Career ==
In his youth Batata played for Clube Atlético Mineiro and Cruzeiro, before being brought to Poland by Antoni Ptak in 1997. He made his debut in Poland for ŁKS Łódź on 11 May 1997 against Polonia Warsaw. His career was mostly decided by Ptak, moving to clubs when it had been decided for him, which resulted in Batata playing for a total of 15 different Polish clubs.

In 2003, Poland national team manager, Paweł Janas, was impressed with Batata that he wanted him to play for the Poland national team, meaning Batata had to apply for Polish citizenship. Accepting Polish citizenship would mean he'd have to rescind his Brazilian citizenship, and was given his citizenship in 2006. By this point Janas was no longer manager and Batata had suffered a few major injuries impacting his playing time. His two major career successes were winning the Copa do Brasil in 1996 with Cruzeiro and the Ekstraklasa Cup in 2007–08 with Dyskobolia Grodzisk Wielkopolski.

Batata made over 300 appearances in Poland, playing for clubs such as ŁKS Łódź (three times), Piotrcovia Piotrków Trybunalski (three times), Polonia Gdańsk, Lechia-Polonia Gdańsk, GKS Katowice, Pogon Szczecin, KSZO Ostrowiec Świętokrzyski, Widzew Łódź, Dyskobolia Grodzisk Wielkopolski, Warta Poznań, Stal Niewiadów, Zawisza Bydgoszcz, Kotwica Kołobrzeg, Motor Lublin, and Chełmianka Chełm.

== Honours ==
Cruzeiro

- Copa do Brasil: 1996

Pogoń Szczecin

- II liga: 2003–04

Dyskobolia Grodzisk Wielkopolski

- Ekstraklasa Cup: 2007–08

Luciążanka Przygłów

- Klasa B Piotrków Trybunalski I: 2023–24
