= Krzysztof Skrzyński =

Polish footballer

Personal information
- Full name: Krzysztof Skrzyński
- Date of birth: 5 September 1964 (age 62)
- Place of birth: Skwierzyna, Poland
- Height: 1.83 m (6 ft 0 in)
- Position: Goalkeeper

Youth career
- –1983: Stilon Gorzów

Senior career*
Years	Team	Apps	(Gls)
1983–1997	Stilon Gorzów		
1997–1998	Polonia Gdańsk	28	(0)
1998	Lechia-Polonia Gdańsk	11	(0)
1999	Jeziorak Iława	4	(0)
- Drawa Krzyż

Managerial career
- Stilon Gorzów (goalkeeping coach)
- * Club domestic league appearances and goals

Krzysztof Skrzyński (born 5 September 1964) is a Polish former professional footballer who played as a goalkeeper. Skrzyński spent the majority of his playing career with Stilon Gorzów before having short spells with Polonia Gdańsk, Lechia-Polonia Gdańsk, and Jeziorak Iława.

== Biography ==
Skrzyński was born in Skwierzyna and started playing football with local team Stilon Gorzów. He made his first team debut on 6 August 1983 in an away draw against Lechia Gdańsk. Skrzyński played with Stilon for 14 years, being involved in one relegation, and winning the III liga during this time. He made more than 100 appearances for Stilon in the II liga. During his time at Stilon he was linked with I liga side Górnik Wałbrzych, but Stilon would not sanction the move. After Stilon were relegated in 1997 Skrzyński joined Polonia Gdańsk who were still playing in the II liga at the time. With Polonia he made 28 appearances in the league, being the club's first choice goalkeeper. At the end of the season Polonia were involved in a merger with Lechia Gdańsk creating the Lechia-Polonia Gdańsk team. To start with, Skrzyński was the first choice keeper of the newly formed team, making his Lechia-Polonia debut on 25 July 1998 against Polonia-Szombierki Bytom. He made 11 appearances in the first half of the season, but decided to move in January 1999 to join Jeziorak Iława. After a short spell with Jeziorak in which he made 4 appearances, Skrzyński joined Drawa Krzyż Wielkopolski before retiring from playing football. Initially after retiring Skrzyński set up his own business, but returned to Stilon Gorzów and became a goalkeeping coach.

== Honours ==
Stilon Gorzów Wielkopolski

- III liga (gr. I): 1985–86
