= Artur Chrzonowski =

Polish association football player

Personal information
- Full name: Artur Chrzonowski
- Date of birth: 20 November 1976 (age 49)
- Place of birth: Gdańsk, Poland
- Height: 1.84 m (6 ft 0 in)
- Position: Defender

Youth career
- –1995: Lechia Gdańsk

Senior career*
Years	Team	Apps	(Gls)
1995–1998	Lechia Gdańsk	88	(5)
1998–1999	Lechia-Polonia Gdańsk	7	(0)
2000–2001	Sparta Brodnica		
2002–2004	Unia Tczew	71	(7)
2004–2006	Olimpia Elbląg	73	(21)
2007–2008	Wierzyca Pelplin	27	(2)
2008–2009	Czarni Ostrowite		
2012–2013	Czarni Ostrowite		
2014–2015	Gwiazda Karsin	10	(1)
2019–	Borowiak Czersk	17	(1)
- * Club domestic league appearances and goals as of 9 January 2021

Artur Chrzonowski (born 20 November 1976) is a former Polish footballer who played as a defender and later futsal player.

== Biography ==
Chrzonowski started playing football with his local team Lechia Gdańsk, joining the first team in 1995. Chrzonowski spent four and a half years with Lechia during a difficult time for the club. His first season saw him playing for Lechia Gdańsk, but this Lechia Gdańsk side was technically the second team for the newly created Olimpia-Lechia Gdańsk team that played in the Ekstraklasa. Chrzonowski made 29 appearances and scored 2 goals in his first season. The season after the Olimpia-Lechia were dissolved, with the Lechia Gdańsk team taking their place in the league. After two seasons Lechia Gdańsk were involved in another merger, this time with Polonia Gdańsk to make Lechia-Polonia Gdańsk. In a 18 months playing for Lechia-Polonia Gdańsk Chrzonowski made 7 appearances, leaving the club midway through the 1999–2000 season.

After leaving Lechia Chrzonowski joined Sparta Brodnica, spending just over a season with the club. Chrzonowski then played for Unia Tczew, making 77 appearances for the club and scoring 7 goals in three seasons, and Olimpia Elbląg making 73 appearances and scoring 21 goals. Chrzonowski spent a season with Wierzyca Pelplin, scoring 2 goals in 27 appearances for the club. He has had two separate spells with Czarni Ostrowite, the first being for the 2008–2009 season, and after which his playing career became more sporadic and not choosing to play every season, the second being the 2012–2013 season. He spent a season with Gwiazda Karsin, making 10 appearances for the club scoring one goal. He joined Borowiak Czersk in 2019.

Chrzonowski also spent time playing futsal, playing with Unisoft Gdynia, Holiday Chojnice, and Red Devils Chojnice. He served as a playing coach for Red Devils Chojnice, a position he lost in 2011 after his contract was terminated.
