= Robert Kugiel =

Polish association football player

Personal information
- Full name: Robert Kugiel
- Date of birth: 8 September 1974 (age 52)
- Place of birth: Poland
- Height: 1.83 m (6 ft 0 in)
- Position: Forward

Senior career*
Years	Team	Apps	(Gls)
1994–1996	Polonia Gdańsk		
1996	Raków Częstochowa	9	(1)
1997–1998	Polonia Gdańsk		
1998–2002	Lechia-Polonia Gdańsk	113	(23)
2002–2005	Kaszubia Kościerzyna		
2005–2006	Bałtyk Gdynia	29	(11)
2006–2008	GKS Kolbudy		
- * Club domestic league appearances and goals

Robert Kugiel (born 8 September 1974) is a Polish former professional footballer who played as a forward. Kugiel spent his career playing in the Pomeranian region of Poland, with the exception of his spell with Raków Częstochowa.

== Career ==
Kugiel started his career with Polonia Gdańsk, with whom in his first season he won promotion to the II liga. In his second season with Polonia Kugiel made 31 appearances and scored 18 goals in the second tier. Despite the impressive goalscoring form from Kugiel, this was not enough to help Polonia suffer relegation, with the team finishing second from bottom. His impressive form, however, did secure Kugiel with a move to top division side Raków Częstochowa, making his I liga debut on 24 August 1996 in the 4–1 home defeat against Stomil Olsztyn, and scoring what would be his only goal in the I liga in the same game. In total Kugiel made 9 appearances and scored 1 goal during his 6 month spell with Raków.

In January Kugiel returned to Polonia, with whom he again helped to win promotion from the third tier into the second tier. In his second attempt with Polonia in the II liga he was not as successful individually, scoring only 6 times in 26 league games, but was part of a much better Polonia side which finished 5th in the league that season. At the end of the season Polonia were involved in a merger with Lechia Gdańsk creating the Lechia-Polonia Gdańsk team which took Polonia's position in the II liga. Kugiel made his Lechia-Polonia debut on 8 August 1998 against Śląsk Wrocław, scoring on his debut in a 2–1 win. Kugiel spent the following four seasons with Lechia-Polonia leaving the club when the merger team was dissolved in 2002, being one of the few players to stay in the team for its entire four year duration as a club. During his time with the club, Lechia-Polonia suffered relegation twice, in 2000–01 and 2001–02. Kugiel made a total of 122 appearances and scored 25 goals while at the club, of which 113 appearances and 23 goals came in the league.

After his time with Lechia-Polonia Kugiel spent three seasons with Kaszubia Kościerzyna playing in the III liga. After his time with Kaszubia he joined Bałtyk Gdynia, with whom he played 31 games and scored 12 goals in all competitions. The final two seasons of his career was spent playing with GKS Kolbudy, before retiring in 2008.

== Personal life ==
Kugiel's son Damian Kugiel is also a professional footballer, and has also spent time playing for Lechia Gdańsk and Bałtyk Gdynia.
