= Marcin Kubsik =

Polish association football player

Personal information
- Full name: Marcin Kubsik
- Date of birth: 30 September 1975 (age 51)
- Place of birth: Gdańsk, Poland
- Height: 1.82 m (6 ft 0 in)
- Position: Midfielder

Youth career
- –1993: Lechia Gdańsk

Senior career*
Years	Team	Apps	(Gls)
1993–1998	Lechia Gdańsk	117	(12)
1996	Olimpia-Lechia Gdańsk	8	(0)
1998–2000	Lechia-Polonia Gdańsk	70	(1)
2001	Zagłębie Lubin	15	(1)
2002	Jagiellonia Białystok	10	(1)
2002	ŁKS Łódź	0	(0)
2003	Stomil Olsztyn	12	(0)
2003	Błękitni Stargard	15	(0)
2004–2005	Thrasyvoulos	27	(0)
2005–2006	Apollon Smyrnis		
2006–2007	Agios Dimitrios	20	(0)
2007	Digenis Akritas		
2008	Viktoria Köln		
2008	Bałtyk Gdynia	13	(0)
2009–2010	Kaszubia Kościerzyna	47	(0)
2011	Grom Kleszczewo		
2012	Powiśle Dzierzgoń	5	(0)
- * Club domestic league appearances and goals

Marcin Kubsik (born 30 September 1975) is a Polish former professional footballer who played as a midfielder. Kubsik made a total of 23 top flight appearances in Poland, and spent time abroad playing in Greece, Cyprus, and Germany.

== Career ==
=== Lechia Gdańsk ===
Born in Gdańsk, Kubsik started playing with the youth sides of his local team, Lechia Gdańsk. He joined the first team for the 1993–94 season, making his professional debut in the 0–1 defeat against Olimpia Poznań on 31 July 1993. During his first two seasons with Lechia, they struggled in the II liga, nearly being relegated in the first season, and being relegated in his second season with the club. For the 1995–96 season, Lechia were involved in a merger with Olimpia Poznań, creating the Olimpia-Lechia Gdańsk team. Olimpia-Lechia Gdańsk took Olimpia Poznań's place in the I liga, while the Lechia Gdańsk team from the previous season was renamed as Lechia Gdańsk II and operated as the club's official second team, playing in the III liga after the previous season's relegation. Kubsik spent the first half of the season playing with the Lechia Gdańsk II team. After the winter break, Kubsik was promoted to the Olimpia-Lechia team and made his I liga debut on 24 March 1996 in a 1–2 defeat to Stomil Olsztyn. Kubsik would go on to make a total of 8 appearances for Olimpia-Lechia in the top division. At the end of the season, Olimpia-Lechia were relegated, and the Olimpia-Lechia team were dissolved. The Lechia Gdańsk team that ran as the club's second team took the place of the Olimpia-Lechia team in the league, and operated as an independent first team again. Over the course of the next two seasons, Kubsik would play a further 61 times in the league, scoring nine goals in the process. At the beginning of the 1998–99 season, Lechia were once again involved in a merger, this time with Polonia Gdańsk, creating the Lechia-Polonia Gdańsk team. Kubsik's debut under the Lechia-Polonia name came on 25 July 1998 in a 2–1 win over Polonia-Szombierki Bytom, another club being operated after a merger between two clubs. He would spend two-and-a-half years with Lechia-Polonia before leaving in 2001. During his time with Lechia Gdańsk and the two resulting merger teams, Kubsik made a total of 206 appearances and scored 14 goals, and is one of only two players to have played for each of Lechia, Olimpia-Lechia and Lechia-Polonia.

=== After Lechia ===
After leaving Lechia-Polonia over the winter break in 2001, he joined I liga team Zagłębie Lubin. His debut for Zagłębie came on 7 March 2001 in the Polish Cup, coming on as a substitute in a 4–0 win over Legia Warsaw. His league debut came four days later, also against Legia, this time playing in a 3–1 win. He made five top-flight appearances for Zagłębie in his first season with the club. In his second season with Zagłębie, he found himself playing in the league often, making a total of 10 league appearances, and scoring his first, and what would be his only goal, in Poland's top division against GKS Katowice. Kubsik left Zagłębie during the break, twelve months after joining the club, and moved to play with Jagiellonia Białystok. After joining Jagiellonia, Kubsik spent the next two seasons playing for four clubs, not spending more than six months with each club he played for. With Jagiellonia, he made 10 appearances, scored once goal, and was sent off twice as Jagiellonia suffered relegation to the third tier. Over the summer, he would join ŁKS Łódź, failing to make an appearance with the club, and joining fellow II liga club Stomil Olsztyn, making 12 appearances for the club, as he once again suffered relegation. He then joined Błękitni Stargard, making 14 appearances, and leaving the club in January during the winter break. At the end of the season, Błękitni also suffered relegation to the III liga.

=== Greece, Cyprus, Germany, and return to Poland ===
After what would have been three relegations with three clubs in three years, Kubsik moved to Greece, playing his football with Thrasyvoulos, spending 18 months playing with the club. He spent seasons with Apollon Smyrnis and Agios Dimitrios, before spending six months with Cypriot team Digenis Akritas. In January 2008, Kubsik moved to Germany to play with Viktoria Köln. At the end of the season, Kubsik left Viktoria, stating reasons due to the club failing to get promoted and failing to pay the wages of three Polish players on high wages, Kubsik included. Upon his return to Poland, he joined Bałtyk Gdynia for six months, making 13 appearances in the III liga, spending the rest of the season with Kaszubia Kościerzyna. Kubsik spent a total of two years with Kaszubia, making 47 league appearances in the process. After his time with Kaszubia, he played for lower league clubs Grom Kleszczewo and Powiśle Dzierzgoń, retiring from playing in 2012.

=== After playing ===
After his retirement from playing football, Kubsik has gone into coaching, coaching various levels of the Lechia Gdańsk academy set up.

== Honours ==
Jagiellonia Białystok

- III liga, group I: 2002–03
