= Jarosław Chwastek =

Polish footballer

Personal information
- Full name: Jarosław Chwastek
- Date of birth: 3 June 1975 (age 51)
- Place of birth: Sławno, Poland
- Height: 1.85 m (6 ft 1 in)
- Position: Defender

Senior career*
Years	Team	Apps	(Gls)
1993	Gryf Polanów		
1994–1995	Gwardia Koszalin		
1995–1996	57 Heinz Club		
1996	Lechia Gdańsk	8	(1)
1997–2000	Pogoń Szczecin	50	(2)
2000	Lechia-Polonia Gdańsk	16	(0)
2001	Chemik Police		
2001	TuS Celle		
2002	Widzew Łódź	0	(0)
2002	Wybrzeże Rewalskie Rewal		
2002–2003	Pogoń Szczecin	5	(0)
2004–2005	Kotwica Kołobrzeg		
2005	Gwardia Koszalin		
2006	Kotwica Kołobrzeg		
2009	Gwardia Koszalin		
2010	Gryf Polanów		
2018	Gryf Polanów		
2021	Saturn Mielno	2	(0)
- * Club domestic league appearances and goals

Jarosław Chwastek (born 3 June 1975) is a Polish former professional footballer who played as a defender.

== Biography ==
Chwastek started playing football with Gryf Polanów and later Gwardia Koszalin. Over the summer of 1995 Chwastek moved to London to go to a language school over the summer holidays, ending up spending the next year in the city washing windows and playing for the Heinz Ketchup factory's team. Chwastek was wanted by Hayes F.C. but would not have been able to get a work permit due to Poland not currently being in the EU at the time. To try and circumnavigate this club officials said they would provide an English woman for him to marry so he could apply for citizenship. Chwastek declined and decided to study at AWF University (University of Physical Education and Sport) in Gdańsk, where he joined Lechia Gdańsk as a result. During his first spell at Lechia Chwastek made 8 appearances in the league, scoring one goal. Chwastek performed well in the first half of the season and garnered interest from promotion chasing Pogoń Szczecin, whom he joined midway through the season. Pogoń finished second in the league at the end of the season, securing promotion to the I liga. Pogoń spent three seasons in the top division before being relegated with Chwastek making 50 appearances and scoring 2 top flight goals. After relegation Chwastek joined Lechia-Polonia Gdańsk, making 16 appearances for the club. This move was the first of short lived moves for Chwastek, not spending more than a season at a club for the rest of his career. Despite moves to TuS Celle in Germany and Widzew Łódź, most of the clubs he played for were in towns or cities located on the Baltic Sea coast, playing for; Chemik Police, Wybrzeże Rewalskie Rewal, Kotwica Kołobrzeg, Gwardia Koszalin, as well as the aforementioned Lechia Gdańsk and Pogoń Szczecin. Chwastek joined Gryf Polanów in 2010, the team he started his career with, initially choosing to retire with his local team growing up. He returned to playing football again in 2018 playing a season with Saturn Mielno.
