= Andriy Danayev =

Ukrainian association football player

Personal information
- Full name: Andriy Valeriyovych Danayev
- Date of birth: 1 September 1979 (age 47)
- Place of birth: Dushanbe, Tajik SSR, Soviet Union
- Height: 1.85 m (6 ft 1 in)
- Positions: Midfielder; forward

Youth career
- –1996: Zorya Luhansk

Senior career*
Years	Team	Apps	(Gls)
1996	Metiz Luhansk	7	(0)
1997	Vedrich Rechitsa	28	(3)
1998	Junior Luhansk	8	(1)
1998	Mykolaiv	0	(0)
1999	GKS Bełchatów	1	(0)
1999	Chemik Police	17	(1)
2000	Odra Szczecin	9	(0)
2000	Kaszubia Kościerzyna		
2001	Lechia-Polonia Gdańsk	5	(0)
2001	Agata Luhansk		
2002	Dongazdobycha Sulin	19	(10)
2002	Caspiy	1	(0)
2002	Inter Luhansk	11	(3)
2002	Donets Lysychansk		
2003	Agata Luhansk	23	(15)
2003	Dongazdobycha Sulin		
2004	Agata Luhansk	12	(8)
2004–2006	Stal Alchevsk	37	(11)
2005	→ Banants (loan)	9	(0)
2006	Agata Luhansk	1	(0)
2006–2007	Zakarpattia Uzhhorod	29	(2)
2007	MKT-Araz	0	(0)
2007–2008	Simurq	22	(3)
2008	Metallurg NPVK	7	(1)
2008	Komunalnyk Luhansk	3	(0)
2009	Poltava	27	(3)
2010	Shakhtar Sverdlovsk	9	(0)
2011	FC Popasna	6	(1)
2012–2014	FC Antratsyt		
2015	Zarya-Stal Luhansk		
2016	Spartak Luhansk		
2017–2018	Dalevets Luhansk		
2018–2020	Zarya Academy Luhansk		
- * Club domestic league appearances and goals as of 9 January 2021

Andriy Valeriyovych Danayev (Ukrainian: Андрій Валерійович Данаєв; born 1 September 1979) is a Tajik-born Ukrainian former professional footballer who played as a midfielder and forward. During his career, he became a journeyman, playing for 29 different clubs over 33 spells. He played in 7 different countries, playing in the top divisions of Poland, Armenia, Ukraine, and Azerbaijan.

== Biography ==
Born in the Tajik SSR, Danayev's family moved to Ukraine at some point during his childhood. He began playing football with the youth sides of Zorya Luhansk, progressing to playing for senior teams from 1996 when he started playing for Metiz Luhansk. After making seven appearances Metiz in his first season as a professional footballer, he joined the Belarusian side Vedrich Rechitsa. He made 28 league appearances for Vedrich, scoring three goals in the process. In 1998, he returned to Ukraine, playing for Junior Luhansk, before joining Ukrainian top division side Mykolaiv. He failed to make an appearance for Mykolaiv in the six months he spent with the club, deciding to try playing football in another country.

In 1999 Danayev moved to Poland, first playing for top-flight team GKS Bełchatów. Danayev made his debut for GKS on 29 May 1999, the final game of the season, coming off the bench in a 1–1 draw with Odra Wodzisław. Danayev had not done enough to prove himself with Bełchatów, and ended up moving to Chemik Police. He spent the start of the 1999–2000 season playing for Chemik, making 17 appearances and scoring one goal, in a season where Chemik would finish runners-up in the league. For the second half of the season, Danayev played for II liga team Odra Szczecin, making nine appearances for the club. He started his final season in Poland at Kaszubia Kościerzyna, before joining Lechia-Polonia Gdańsk after the winter break. He made five appearances in total for Lechia-Polonia. During his two and a half seasons in Poland, Danayev played for five different teams, without spending more than six months with each team.

In 2001, he returned to Ukraine, and to Luhansk, this time to play for Agata Luhansk. He did not stay with Agata for long before moving to Russia to play with Dongazdobycha. His time with Dongazdobycha was successful, in which he scored 10 goals in 19 games. This successful spell in the lower leagues of Russia drew interest from the Kazakhstan team FC Caspiy, however Danayev went on to only make one appearance for the second division team. Once again Danayev found himself playing in the Luhansk region of Ukraine, starting with Inter Luhansk, where he played 11 games and scored three goals, before joining Donets Lysychansk, eventually returning to Agata Luhansk, where he enjoyed his most prolific time as a player, scoring 15 goals in 23 games. After this prolific spell with Agata, he returned to Dongazdobycha, scoring 12 goals, but it is unknown how many games he played during this time. After playing in Russia for six months, he again returned to play with Agata. Due to his prolific from over the previous 18 months, Danayev eventually secured himself a move to second division club Stal Alchevsk.

Danayev played in the Ukrainian First League over the 2004–05 season, playing 30 games and scoring 10 goals. It was an impressive season for the club, as they went on to win the league and secured promotion to Ukraine's top division. Danayev started the following season on loan to Armenian top division club Urartu. After his loan deal ended, he spent the second half of the season with Stal, playing his first games in Ukraine's top division. He made seven appearances and scored once in what was his only season playing in the Ukrainian Premier League.

While without a club the following season, Danayev joined Agata, playing one game for the club, before securing a permanent move to Ukrainian First League team Zakarpattia Uzhhorod. Danayev spent the season with Zakarpattia before moving to Azerbaijan to play. He originally joined second division side MKT-Araz, but joined top division side Simurq PIK before even making a league appearance for MKT-Araz. In the Azerbaijani top division, Danayev made 22 appearances, scoring three goals.

Returning to Ukraine, Danayev had short spells with Metallurg NPVK and Kommunalnik Luhansk, eventually settling down for 18 months to play with Poltava. After his time with Poltava, Danayev played for Shakhtar Sverdlovsk, FC Popasnaya and GP Anthracite. After the Russian invasion into Ukraine in 2014, he began playing in the so called "LPR Football Championship", playing in newly created clubs that were not part of the Ukrainian leagues. He played for Zarya-Stal Luhansk, Spartak Luhansk, Dalevets Luhansk, and Zarya Academy Luhansk. During this time he also started his coaching career, coaching for Spartak and Dalevets.

== Honours ==
Stal Alchevsk

- Ukrainian First League: 2004–05
