= Jacek Cuch =

Polish footballer

Personal information
- Full name: Jacek Cuch
- Date of birth: 25 June 1973 (age 53)
- Place of birth: Poland
- Height: 1.80 m (5 ft 11 in)
- Position: Defender

Senior career*
Years	Team	Apps	(Gls)
–1998	Polonia Gdańsk	43	(1)
1998–2001	Lechia-Polonia Gdańsk	16	(0)
2001–2002	Orzeł Trąbki Wielkie		
- * Club domestic league appearances and goals

Jacek Cuch (born 25 June 1973) is a former Polish footballer who played as a defender.

There is little information on Cuch's early footballing career, but it is known that from at least 1995 until 1998 he played for Polonia Gdańsk. He made 15 appearances and scored 1 goal during the 1995–96 season when Polonia were relegated into the third tier. He was a part of the squad that won the III liga (Gdańsk group) the following season, and made a further 28 appearances in the II liga upon Polonia's return. In 1998 Polonia were involved in a merger with Lechia Gdańsk creating the Lechia-Polonia Gdańsk team. Cuch made his Lechia-Polonia debut on 25 July 1998 against Polonia-Szombierki Bytom. He spent three seasons with Lechia-Polonia, leaving the team in 2001 after the team were relegated to the III liga. In total for Lechia-Polonia he made a total of 19 appearances, and jointly for Lechia-Polonia and Polonia Gdańsk he made 59 appearances in Polish second division. He played with Orzeł Trąbki Wielkie for one season, retiring from playing at the end of the season.

== Honours ==
Polonia Gdańsk

- III liga (gr. Gdańsk): 1996–97
