= Tomasz Borkowski =

Polish association football player

Personal information
- Full name: Tomasz Borkowski
- Date of birth: 30 November 1972 (age 53)
- Place of birth: Gdańsk, Poland
- Height: 1.79 m (5 ft 10 in)
- Position: Defender

Team information
- Current team: Poland U15 (women) (head coach)

Senior career*
Years	Team	Apps	(Gls)
1993–1995	Lechia Gdańsk	11	(0)
1995–1996	Bałtyk Gdynia	17	(1)
1996–1998	Lechia Gdańsk	61	(3)
1998–2002	Lechia-Polonia Gdańsk	106	(1)
2002	Unia Tczew		
2003–2005	Lechia Gdańsk	61	(4)
Total		256	(9)

Managerial career
- 2006–2007: Lechia Gdańsk
- 2008–2010: Lechia Gdańsk II
- 2016–2025: AP Orlen Gdańsk
- 2026–: Poland U15 (women)
- * Club domestic league appearances and goals

Tomasz Borkowski (born 30 November 1972) is a Polish professional football manager and former player. He is currently in charge of the Poland women's national under-15 team.

== Senior career ==
The majority of Borkowski's career was spent with Lechia Gdańsk, playing in total 258 games and scoring ten goals in all competitions during his three spells with the club (including his time with Lechia-Polonia Gdańsk). During his playing career, he also had two brief stints with Bałtyk Gdynia, where he played for a season, and Unia Tczew, where he only played for six months.

== Coaching career ==
Since his retirement, Borkowski has gone into coaching, with his first management spell in 2006 with Lechia Gdańsk. He spent one season as the Lechia first team manager, before he joined the Lechia's second team as their manager in 2008. After spending time at various youth levels with Lechia, he left as a coach of the club in 2011, joining the newly established AP Orlen Gdańsk, which focused on the development of youth players in its academy. Borkowski earned his UEFA Pro Licence in 2014. In 2016 Borkowski, became the manager of the AP Orlen Gdańsk women's team, leading the team from the third division to the Ekstraliga, Poland's top division of women's football, in 2020. On 26 May 2025, it was announced Borkowski would leave his post at the conclusion of the 2024–25 season.

On 26 March 2026, he was announced as the new head coach of the Poland women's national under-15 team, replacing Katarzyna Barlewicz.

== Honours ==
=== Player ===
Lechia Gdańsk

- III liga, group II: 2004–05
- IV liga Pomerania: 2003–04
- Regional league Gdańsk II: 2002–03

=== Manager ===
AP Orlen Gdańsk

- I liga North: 2019–20
- II liga Greater Poland: 2016–17
