= Adam Tokarz =

Polish footballer

Personal information
- Full name: Adam Tokarz
- Date of birth: 19 December 1944
- Place of birth: Karwodrza, Poland
- Date of death: 14 November 2014 (aged 69)
- Place of death: Gdańsk, Poland
- Height: 1.69 m (5 ft 7 in)
- Position: Forward

Senior career*
| Years | Team | Apps | (Gls) |
| –1967 | Moto Jelcz Oława | | |
| 1967–1969 | Śląsk Wrocław | 27 | (6) |
| 1969–1973 | Górnik Wałbrzych | | |
| 1973–1974 | Lechia Gdańsk | 13 | (0) |
| 1974–1978 | Stoczniowiec Gdańsk | | |

International career
- Poland B
- * Club domestic league appearances and goals

Adam Tokarz (19 December 1944 – 14 November 2014) was a Polish footballer who played as a forward.

== Biography ==
Tokarz started his career playing football with Moto Jelcz Oława, joining I liga side Śląsk Wrocław in 1967. He spent two seasons with Śląsk, going on to make 27 appearances and scoring six goals in the top division in Poland. After his time with Śląsk he joined Górnik Wałbrzych, where he spent four seasons. During his first season Górnik were the team were relegated, but won the league the following season to secure automatic promotion the first time of asking. In 1973 he joined Lechia Gdańsk for a season, playing 13 games in the league, and playing a total of 15 games and scoring 2 goals in all competitions. After one season Tokarz left Lechia to join Stoczniowiec Gdańsk, spending four seasons with the club before retiring from football in 1978.

At some point during his career Tokarz was called up to the Poland B team, but was never called up to represent the Poland national team.

== Honours ==
Górnik Wałbrzych

- III liga (gr. I): 1970–71
