= Julcimar =

Brazilian association football player

Personal information
- Full name: Julcimar Conceição de Souza
- Date of birth: 30 July 1978 (age 48)
- Place of birth: Contagem, Brazil
- Height: 1.80 m (5 ft 11 in)
- Position: Defender

Senior career*
Years	Team	Apps	(Gls)
1996	Cruzeiro		
1997–1998	Piotrcovia	7	(0)
1998	Lechia-Polonia Gdańsk	6	(0)
1999	ŁKS Łódź	13	(0)
1999	Świt Nowy Dwór Mazowiecki	7	(0)
1999	Dyskobolia Grodzisk Wlk.	3	(0)
2000	Piotrcovia		
2000–2001	ŁKS Łódź	31	(1)
2001	RKS Radomsko	15	(0)
2002–2003	Piotrcovia	31	(3)
2003–2007	Pogoń Szczecin	104	(3)
- * Club domestic league appearances and goals

Julcimar Conceição de Souza (born 30 July 1978) known as Julcimar, is a Brazilian former professional footballer who played as a defender and spent the majority of his career playing in Poland.

== Career ==
Julcimar was born in Contagem, Brazil, and started playing football with Belo Horizonte football team Cruzeiro. In 1997 Julcimar was brought to Poland by Polish businessman Antoni Ptak, starting his career in Poland with Piotrcovia Piotrków Trybunalski. In 1998 Julcimar joined II liga side Lechia-Polonia Gdańsk, making his debut on 19 September 1998 in a 2–0 win over Odra Szczecin. During his six months with Lechia-Polonia, Julcimar made eight appearances for the club before moving on to Ekstraklasa side ŁKS Łódź in the January transfer window. Julcimar made his ŁKS and top-flight debut on 27 February 1999, playing against Górnik Zabrze. He continued to have short spells at clubs, making seven league appearances for Świt Nowy Dwór Mazowiecki and three outings for Dyskobolia Grodzisk Wlk., spending only a few months with each side. In 2000, he returned to Piotrcovia for half-a-year, before rejoining ŁKS. With ŁKS, Julcimar made 31 appearances and scored once. After short spells with RKS Radomsko and a return to Piotrcovia for the third time, Julcimar finally settled down in 2003 with Pogoń Szczecin, spending four seasons with the club, and making over 100 league appearances before eventually retiring in 2007 and returning to Brazil.

Since retiring from football Julcimar has run a footballing school for children aged 5–15.

== Honours ==
Pogoń Szczecin

- II liga: 2003–04
