= Jacek Paszulewicz =

Polish footballer and manager

Personal information
- Date of birth: 15 January 1977 (age 49)
- Place of birth: Gdynia, Poland
- Height: 1.94 m (6 ft 4 in)
- Position: Defender

Senior career*
Years	Team	Apps	(Gls)
1991–1998	Stoczniowiec/Polonia Gdańsk		
1996	→ Stolem Gniewino (loan)		
1998–1999	ŁKS Łódź	25	(2)
1998	→ Lechia/Polonia Gdańsk (loan)	5	(1)
2000	Polonia Warsaw	12	(0)
2000	ŁKS Łódź	3	(0)
2001	Śląsk Wrocław	13	(4)
2001	Dyskobolia Grodzisk Wielkopolski	9	(1)
2001–2002	Widzew Łódź	12	(2)
2002–2003	Wisła Kraków	30	(2)
2004	Chengdu Wuniu		
2005–2006	Wisła Kraków	0	(0)
2007	Górnik Zabrze	6	(0)

Managerial career
- 2015: Olimpia Grudziądz
- 2015–2018: Olimpia Grudziądz
- 2018: GKS Katowice
- 2019: Widzew Łódź
- * Club domestic league appearances and goals

Jacek Paszulewicz (born 15 January 1977) is a Polish professional football manager and former player who is currently the director of Jaguar Gdańsk's academy. He was the chairman of Polish side Bałtyk Gdynia from 2019 to 2021.

== Career ==
Paszulewicz started his managerial career with Olimpia Grudziądz in the Polish I liga, a position he held until 2018. After that, he coached GKS Katowice and Widzew Łódź.

== Honours ==
=== Player ===
Polonia Warsaw

- Ekstraklasa: 1999–2000
- Polish League Cup: 1999–2000

Wisła Kraków

- Ekstraklasa: 2002–03
- Polish Cup: 2002–03
