= 2004–05 Ukrainian First League =

Ukrainian First League
- Season: 2004–05
- Champions: Stal Alchevsk (1st title)
- Promoted: Stal Alchevsk; Arsenal Kharkiv
- Relegated: Nafkom Brovary; MFK Mykolaiv; Polissya Zhytomir
- Top goalscorer: 16 - Oleksandr Aliyev (Dynamo-2); Roman Pakholiuk (Nyva)

The 2004–05 Ukrainian First League was the 14th since its establishment. Eighteen teams competed in the competition.

The competition began on July 17, 2004 with six matches. The competition had a winter break and resumed March 19, 2005.

== Teams ==
=== Promoted teams ===
Two clubs promoted from the 2003-04 Ukrainian Second League.

Group A

- FC Hazovyk-Skala Stryi – champion (debut)

Group B

- FC Dynamo-Ihroservis Simferopol – champion (debut)

Group C

- FC Stal Dniprodzerzhynsk – champion (debut)

=== Relegated teams ===
One club was relegated from the 2003-04 Ukrainian Top League:

- FC Karpaty Lviv – 15th place (debut)

=== Renamed teams ===
- Before the start of season, FC Krasyliv-Obolon Krasyliv merged with lower league FC Podillya Khmelnytskyi and changed its name to FC Podillya Khmelnytskyi, while the lower league clubs was dissolved.
- Before the start of season, FC Nafkom-Akademia Irpin was relocated and changed its name to FC Nafkom Brovary.
- Before the start of season, FC Naftovyk Okhtyrka changed its name to FC Naftovyk-Ukrnafta Okhtyrka.
- At the end of season, FC Spartak-Horobyna Sumy changed its name to FC Spartak Sumy.

=== Location ===
In 2004-05 season, the Ukrainian First League consists of the following teams:

Locations of teams in First League

== Final table ==
Pos	Team	Pld	W	D	L	GF	GA	GD	Pts	Promotion or relegation
1	Stal Alchevsk (C, P)	34	22	11	1	60	24	+36	77	Promoted to Vyshcha Liha
2	Arsenal Kharkiv (P)	34	23	4	7	47	24	+23	73	Promoted to Vyshcha Liha
3	Zorya Luhansk	34	19	9	6	54	21	+33	66	
4	Dynamo-2 Kyiv	34	16	6	12	48	33	+15	54	
5	Nyva Vinnytsia (D)	34	15	8	11	49	38	+11	53	Withdrew after the season
6	Karpaty Lviv	34	15	7	12	39	35	+4	52	
7	CSKA Kyiv	34	15	6	13	28	38	−10	51	
8	Spartak Ivano-Frankivsk	34	15	5	14	34	33	+1	50	
9	Stal Dniprodzerzhynsk	34	14	7	13	42	47	−5	49	
10	Naftovyk-Ukrnafta Okhtyrka	34	13	10	11	37	26	+11	49	
11	Shakhtar-2 Donetsk	34	13	5	16	45	53	−8	44	
12	Hazovyk-Skala Stryi	34	12	7	15	34	39	−5	43	
13	Podillya Khmelnytskyi	34	12	7	15	45	54	−9	43	
14	Dynamo-Ihroservice Simferopol	34	12	5	17	38	57	−19	41	
15	Spartak-Horobyna Sumy	34	9	12	13	34	41	−7	39	
16	Nafkom Brovary (R)	34	9	10	15	26	38	−12	37	Relegated to Second League
17	Mykolaiv (R)	34	8	7	19	15	40	−25	31	Relegated to Second League
18	Polissya Zhytomyr (D)	34	0	2	32	5	39	−34	2	Dissolved

Source: www.uafootball.net.ua
(C) Champions; (D) Disqualified; (P) Promoted; (R) Relegated
- FC Polissya Zhytomyr became insolvent during the mid-season winter break and the UFF awarded technical victories against them in the second half of the season.
- FC Nyva Vinnytsia withdrew before the start of the next season yielding its place to its farm club FC Bershad which was playing in the lower tier.

Persha Liha 2004-05 Winners
FC Stal Alchevsk
First title

== Top scorers ==
Statistics are taken from here.

Scorer	Goals (pen.)	Team
(Ukraine) Roman Pakholiuk	17 (2)	Nyva Vinnytsia
(Ukraine) Oleksandr Aliyev	16 (3)	Dynamo-2 Kyiv
(Ukraine) Petro Kondratiuk	13 (2)	Nyva Vinnytsia
(Ukraine) Maksym Feschuk	12 (1)	Karpaty Lviv
(Ukraine) Vladyslav Holopyorov	12 (4)	Shakhtar-2 Donetsk
(Ukraine) Oleksiy Yakymenko	12 (6)	Zoria Luhansk
(Ukraine) Serhiy Sernetskyi	11 (3)	Stal Alchevsk
(Armenia) Ara Hakobyan	11 (4)	Stal D. / Stal A.
(Ukraine) Oleksiy Hryshchenko	11 (6)	Dynamo-Ihroservis Simferopol
(Ukraine) Andriy Danayev	10	Stal Alchevsk
