= Romuald Szukiełowicz =

Polish football manager (born 1943)

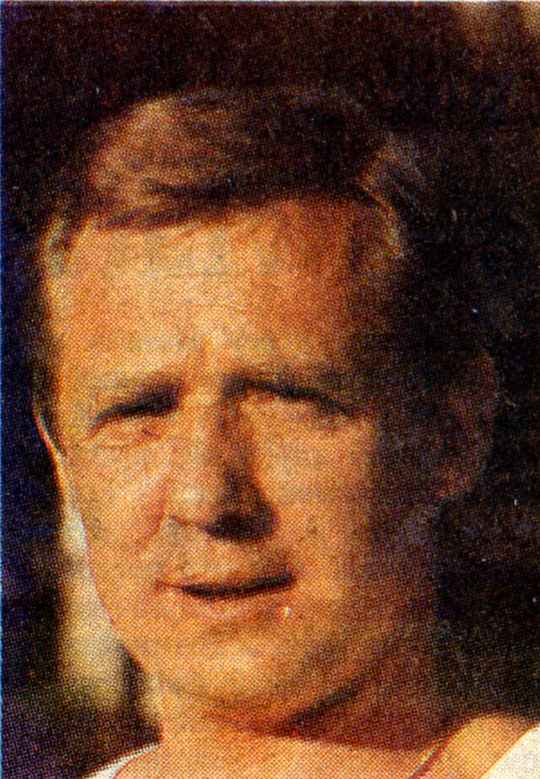
- Szukiełowicz in 1990

Personal information
- Date of birth: 10 February 1949 (age 77)
- Place of birth: Wrocław, Poland

Senior career*
Years	Team	Apps	(Gls)
- Śląsk Wrocław
- Odra Wrocław
- Lightning Chicago
- Ajax Chicago

Managerial career
- Lightning Chicago
- Odra Wrocław
- Śląsk Wrocław II
- Piast Iłowa
- 1987–1988: MKS Oława
- 1988–1991: Śląsk Wrocław
- 1991: MKS Oława
- 1992–93: Pogoń Szczecin
- 1994: Zawisza Bydgoszcz
- 1994–1995: Lech Poznań
- 1995–1996: Śląsk Wrocław
- 1996–1997: Pogoń Szczecin
- 1997–1998: Hutnik Kraków
- 1999: Stomil Olsztyn
- 2000: Lechia-Polonia Gdańsk
- 2001: Górnik Polkowice
- 2002: Odra Opole
- 2004: Aluminium Konin
- 2004: Bystrzyca Kąty Wrocławskie
- 2005–2006: Polonia New York
- 2007: Zagłębie Sosnowiec
- 2011–2012: Czarni Żagań
- 2015: Flota Świnoujście
- 2015: Zagłębie Sosnowiec
- 2015: Foto-Higiena Gać
- 2015–2016: Śląsk Wrocław
- * Club domestic league appearances and goals

Romuald Szukiełowicz (born 3 September 1943) is a Polish former professional football manager and player. From 1994 to 2001, he was a member of the Board of Coaches for the PZPN.

== Career ==
Szukiełowicz started his career at Śląsk Wrocław, and progressed from the youth team into the senior team. After his time at Śląsk he joined Odra Wrocław. Between 1979 and 1983, he spent his time in Chicago, USA, playing for Lightning Chicago and Ajax Chicago.

After his playing career, Szukiełowicz moved into management, firstly in the US with Lightning Chicago, before moving back to Poland joining Odra Wrocław firstly, then Śląsk Wrocław, managing their second team. After short spells with Piast Iłowa and MKS Oława, he rejoined Śląsk Wrocław, this time managing the first team. After three seasons with Śląsk in the Ekstraklasa, Szukiełowicz left to join MKS Oława for the second time, and then Pogoń Szczecin in 1992.

Szukiełowicz was only with Pogoń for one season. In 1994, he moved to Zawisza Bydgoszcz, before taking charge of Lech Poznań the same year. He then managed Śląsk Wrocław in 1995–96, Pogoń Szczecin in 1996–97 and Hutnik Kraków in 1997–98. After Hutnik, he had a string of jobs where he did not spend longer than a year with the teams. In 2000 he was manager of Lechia-Polonia Gdańsk, a team which was created as a merger of Lechia Gdańsk and Polonia Gdańsk. Szukiełowicz was the last permanent manager of the team, before it fully disbanded in 2002, with Lechia and Polonia both having to start from the lowest divisions of Polish football after the separation.

After short spells with Górnik Polkowice, Odra Opole, Aluminium Konin, and Bystrzyca Kąty Wrocławskie, he moved back to the US to manage Polonia New York from 2005–06, and then Zagłębie Sosnowiec for 2007. After being in the job for only a few months, Szukiełowicz was then without a role in management until 2011, with Czarni Żagań, who he was with until 2012.

After another few years without a managerial job, Szukiełowicz returned in 2015, a year in which he worked with four teams. Firstly with Flota Świnoujście, Zagłębie Sosnowiec, Foto-Higiena Gać, before joining Śląsk Wrocław for the third time, Szukiełowicz's last job as a manager.
