= Lechia-Polonia Gdańsk =

Polish football team

- Full name: Lechia-Polonia Gdańsk Sportowa Spółka Akcyjna
- Founded: 1 July 1998; 27 years ago
- Dissolved: 31 June 2002; 23 years ago
- Ground: MOSiR Stadium
- Capacity: 12,244
- Manager: Witold Kulik & Stanisław Stachura (1998–99); Jerzy Jastrzębowski (1999–2000); Wiesław Wika (2000); Romuald Szukiełowicz (2000); Stanisław Stachura (2000–02)
2001–2002 Home colours	2001–2002 Away colours

Lechia-Polonia Gdańsk was a team which played in the Polish second division from 1998 to 2001. The team was created by a merger of Lechia Gdańsk and Polonia Gdańsk.

== History ==
=== Pre-merger ===
==== Polonia Gdańsk ====
Polonia Gdańsk were founded in 1945 as NS Nit Gdańsk. After years of playing football in the lower divisions, and further name changes (Stal Gdańsk and RKS Stoczniowiec Gdańsk). The team finally found stability and were called Polonia Gdańsk.

The team finally achieved promotion to the second division in 1973 after winning their division, and finishing as runners up the previous season. The 1970s saw the team's high point in their history. The team enjoyed 9 seasons in the second division before being relegated in 1982. The team's greatest achievement so far came in the 1976/77 season when the team finished 3rd, just missing out on promotion to the top division. From 1982 to 1998 Polonia experienced another 3 seasons in the second tier, each time only lasting in the division for one season. The team won the third tier 3 times during this period, as well as finishing runners up a further 5 times.

==== Lechia Gdańsk ====
Lechia Gdańsk were also founded in 1945. Lechia's greatest success in the top flight came during the 1950s, when the club finished 3rd during the 1956 season. After spending the 1960s and 70s in the lower divisions, Lechia won the Polish Cup and the Polish SuperCup in 1983. After a spell back in the top flight, Lechia soon found themselves playing in the lower divisions once more. During the 1995 season, Lechia had previously been part of another merger, this time with Olimpia Poznań to create Olimpia-Lechia Gdańsk. The merger lasted only one season before both teams split. It was only two seasons after their first merger that Lechia were to be involved in another, this time with Polonia.

=== Lechia-Polonia Gdańsk ===
The first season for Lechia-Polonia was moderately successful. The previous season Polonia finished in 5th place, for the 1998–99 season Lechia-Polonia managed to achieve 7th in the league. The following season was more unsuccessful, finishing the season in 14th. Robert Kubiel finished as the team's highest goalscorer with 10 goals to his name. The following season got worse for Lechia-Polonia, with the team finishing 19th out of 20 teams. Despite being in a lower division the team proved to be less than competitive, and the team once again faced relegation, this time finishing in 15th. After the 2001–02 season, the Lechia-Polonia dissolved.

=== After the merger ===
Polonia Gdańsk created a separate team in 1999, one year after the merger. Despite the team still being involved in the merger by name, most saw this as the teams continuation of the original team, and not the Lechia-Polonia team. The reforming meant that Polonia had to restart from Poland's lowest divisions. The highest the team has achieved since the turn of the century was 2 seasons in the third division, finishing 14th and 16th from 2012 to 2014. Back to back relegation's meant the team were playing in the firth tier once again, and currently find themselves playing in the District Division - Gdańsk Group I.

Lechia Gdańsk also created a separate team from the Lechia-Polonia team in 2001, and was also seen as the continuation of the team before the merger. In 2001 there were therefore 3 teams playing football as a result of the merger; Lechia-Polonia Gdańsk, Lechia Gdańsk, and Polonia Gdańsk. While the dissolved Lechia-Polonia team left both Lechia and Polonia in much worse positions than before the merger, Lechia took full advantage of the situation they found themselves in. After having to start from the bottom, Lechia's fortunes changed and they found themselves playing in the Ekstraklasa once again for the 2008/09 season. After 11 seasons of continuous top flight football Lechia won both the Polish Cup and the Polish SuperCup in 2019, leading to the team playing European football for only the second time in their history.

== Seasons ==
Season	Tier	Division	Position	Polish Cup	Comments	
1998/99	II	II League (west)	7 of 14	Round of 16	Team created by a merger between Lechia Gdańsk and Polonia Gdańsk.	
1999/00	II	II League	14 of 24	Round of 16	Polonia Gdańsk left the merger, restarting in the IV liga (sixth tier).	
2000/01	II	II League	19 of 20	Round 2	Lechia-Polonia Gdańsk are relegated.	
2001/02	III	III League (g. 2)	15 of 19	-	Lechia Gdańsk create an independent club at the start of the season, restarting in the IV liga (sixth tier).	Lechia-Polonia Gdańsk suffer financial difficulties and folded at the end of the season.

== Player statistics ==
=== Seasonal top goalscorers ===
The players who scored the most goals for the club during a season.

Season	Player	Goals
1998–99	Adam Fedoruk	9
1999–2000	Robert Kugiel	10
2000–01	Dariusz Preis	7
2001–02	Robert Kugiel	7

=== Top player statistics ===
The top 5 players with the most appearances and goals in the league for Lechia-Polonia.

Apps
No.	Name	Apps
1	Bartosz Skierka	128
2	Robert Kugiel	113
3	Tomasz Borkowski	106
4	Maciej Zezula	86
5	Grzegorz Miłkowski	82

Goals
No.	Name	Goals
1	Robert Kugiel	23
2	Maciej Zezula	18
3	Adam Fedoruk	11
4	Marek Zieńczuk	8
5	Miroslaw Feith	8

=== League statistics ===
All of the league statistics of all players over the four seasons of the clubs existence.

			1998–99		1999–2000		2000–01		2001–02		total	
Player	Nat	pos	apps	goals	apps	goals	apps	goals	apps	goals	apps	goals
Goalkeepers
Tomasz Borowiec	(Poland)	GK	0	0	0	0	1	0	0	0	1	0
Krzysztof Dadacz	(Poland)	GK	0	0	0	0	0	0	6	0	6	0
Tomasz Dargacz	(Poland)	GK	0	0	0	0	0	0	2	0	2	0
Artur Dyszkiewicz	(Poland)	GK	0	0	0	0	0	0	6	0	6	0
Mariusz Giergiel	(Poland)	GK	3	0	0	0	0	0	0	0	3	0
Artur Jażdżewski	(Poland)	GK	0	0	0	0	0	0	3	0	3	0
Maciej Kozak	(Poland)	GK	0	0	31	0	1	0	0	0	32	0
Maciej Kudrycki	(Poland)	GK	12	0	0	0	0	0	0	0	12	0
Krzysztof Pilarz	(Poland)	GK	0	0	14	0	37	0	19	0	70	0
Krzysztof Skrzyński	(Poland)	GK	11	0	0	0	0	0	0	0	11	0
Defenders
Piotr Antkowicz	(Poland)	DF	0	0	0	0	0	0	12	2	12	2
Jarosław Bach	(Poland)	DF	0	0	0	0	1	0	17	0	18	0
Bartosz Berlik	(Poland)	DF	0	0	0	0	0	0	10	1	10	1
Tomasz Borkowski	(Poland)	DF	13	0	34	1	32	0	27	0	106	1
Piotr Bubiłek	(Poland)	DF	0	0	0	0	2	0	0	0	0	0
Jarosław Chwastek	(Poland)	DF	0	0	0	0	16	0	0	0	16	0
Artur Chrzonowski	(Poland)	DF	0	0	7	0	0	0	0	0	7	0
Jacek Cuch	(Poland)	DF	9	0	6	0	1	0	0	0	16	0
Daniel Czuk	(Poland)	DF	0	0	0	0	14	0	0	0	14	0
Mauro Sérgio da Silva	(Brazil)	DF	0	0	0	0	5	0	0	0	5	0
Piotr Jacyna	(Poland)	DF	0	0	0	0	13	0	0	0	13	0
Julcimar	(Brazil)	DF	6	0	0	0	0	0	0	0	6	0
Zbigniew Kaczmarek	(Poland)	DF	12	0	0	0	0	0	0	0	12	0
Marcin Klaczka	(Poland)	DF	0	0	16	1	0	0	0	0	16	1
Grzegorz Krysiak	(Poland)	DF	0	0	14	1	0	0	0	0	14	1
Marcin Kubsik	(Poland)	MF	14	1	38	0	18	0	0	0	70	1
Wojciech Kupiec	(Poland)	DF	0	0	0	0	0	0	7	0	7	0
Michał Latos	(Poland)	DF	0	0	0	0	0	0	3	0	3	0
Adam Merchut	(Poland)	DF	1	0	0	0	0	0	0	0	1	0
Tomasz Michalski	(Poland)	DF	16	0	18	0	17	0	15	0	66	0
Grzegorz Miłkowski	(Poland)	DF	10	1	30	1	28	1	14	0	82	3
Grzegorz Motyka	(Poland)	DF	0	0	21	4	0	0	0	0	21	4
Paweł Onych	(Poland)	DF	0	0	0	0	0	0	15	0	15	0
Henryk Patyk	(Poland)	DF	0	0	0	0	0	0	19	0	19	0
Dariusz Pawski	(Poland)	DF	8	0	0	0	0	0	0	0	8	0
Jacek Paszulewicz	(Poland)	DF	5	1	0	0	0	0	0	0	5	1
Jacek Pieniążek	(Poland)	DF	0	0	0	0	8	0	0	0	8	0
Paweł Predehl	(Poland)	DF	7	1	0	0	0	0	0	0	7	1
Robert Rzeczycki	(Poland)	DF	0	0	12	0	0	0	0	0	12	0
Wojciech Sekuła	(Poland)	DF	0	0	0	0	1	0	14	0	15	0
Robert Sierpiński	(Poland)	DF	0	0	5	0	0	0	0	0	5	0
Bartosz Skierka	(Poland)	DF	26	0	42	1	32	1	28	2	128	4
Adam Tanecki	(Poland)	DF	0	0	0	0	0	0	12	1	12	1
Daniel Weber	(Poland)	DF	0	0	31	3	0	0	0	0	31	3
Marcin Włódarczyk	(Poland)	DF	0	0	6	1	0	0	0	0	6	1
Midfielders
Artur Antończuk	(Poland)	MF	0	0	0	0	0	0	13	0	13	0
Michał Biskup	(Poland)	MF	0	0	21	0	0	0	0	0	21	0
Marcin Borzęcki	(Poland)	MF	0	0	0	0	0	0	6	0	6	0
Tomasz Broner	(Poland)	MF	0	0	0	0	0	0	12	3	12	3
Maciej Czuczeło	(Poland)	MF	0	0	0	0	0	0	11	0	11	0
Andriy Danayev	(Ukraine)	MF	0	0	0	0	5	0	0	0	5	0
Bartosz Dolański	(Poland)	MF	0	0	0	0	0	0	13	0	13	0
Justin Evans	(United States)	MF	0	0	8	0	0	0	0	0	8	0
Adam Fedoruk	(Poland)	MF	21	7	12	2	17	2	0	0	50	11
Andrzej Golecki	(Poland)	MF	25	2	40	4	0	0	0	0	65	6
Piotr Kasperski	(Poland)	MF	0	0	0	0	13	0	0	0	13	0
Piotr Kasperski	(Poland)	MF	0	0	0	0	13	0	0	0	13	0
Marcin Kubsik	(Poland)	MF	14	1	38	0	18	0	0	0	70	1
Maciej Lewna	(Poland)	MF	0	0	30	3	0	0	5	1	35	4
Sebastian Mila	(Poland)	MF	0	0	12	2	22	2	0	0	34	4
Sebastian Osmólski	(Poland)	MF	0	0	0	0	0	0	9	0	9	0
Saulo Pereira de Carvalho	(Brazil)	MF	11	0	0	0	0	0	0	0	11	0
Karol Piątek	(Poland)	MF	0	0	1	0	17	0	3	1	21	1
Dariusz Preis	(Poland)	MF	0	0	0	0	34	6	0	0	34	6
Oskar Stanek	(Poland)	MF	0	0	0	0	0	0	23	5	23	5
Adam Szymura	(Poland)	MF	14	0	7	0	11	0	2	0	34	0
Marek Widzicki	(Poland)	MF	0	0	0	0	0	0	10	0	10	0
Marcin Wiewiórski	(Poland)	MF	0	0	0	0	0	0	2	0	2	0
Maciej Zezula	(Poland)	MF	26	5	42	7	0	0	18	6	86	18
Marek Zieńczuk	(Poland)	MF	21	3	23	5	0	0	0	0	44	8
Andrzej Zięba	(Poland)	MF	0	0	0	0	11	1	0	0	11	1
Forwards
Napoleon Amaefule	(Nigeria)	FW	0	0	0	0	17	1	0	0	17	1
Dawid Banaczek	(Poland)	FW	5	1	0	0	0	0	0	0	5	1
Sérgio Batata	(Brazil)	FW	7	1	0	0	0	0	0	0	7	1
Michael Butler	(Liberia)	FW	0	0	1	0	0	0	0	0	1	0
Joenal Castma	(Haiti)	FW	0	0	1	0	0	0	0	0	1	0
Jarosław Chwiałkowski	(Poland)	FW	15	1	0	0	0	0	0	0	15	1
Marcin Danielewicz	(Poland)	FW	12	2	0	0	0	0	0	0	12	2
Marek Fanslau	(Poland)	FW	0	0	0	0	0	0	8	1	8	1
Michał Fedorowicz	(Poland)	FW	0	0	0	0	0	0	14	1	14	1
Miroslaw Feith	(Poland)	FW	21	3	31	3	0	0	11	2	63	8
Marcin Florek	(Poland)	FW	0	0	0	0	14	1	0	0	14	1
Piotr Grudzień	(Poland)	FW	0	0	4	0	0	0	0	0	4	0
Austin Hamlet	(Nigeria)	FW	6	1	0	0	0	0	0	0	6	1
Marcin Kaliński	(Poland)	FW	0	0	0	0	9	1	0	0	9	1
Adrian Klimowicz	(Poland)	FW	0	0	0	0	0	0	7	2	7	2
Robert Kugiel	(Poland)	FW	20	3	38	10	26	3	29	7	113	23
Tomasz Moskal	(Poland)	FW	0	0	0	0	16	6	0	0	16	6
Arkadiusz Mulinek	(Poland)	FW	1	0	0	0	0	0	0	0	1	0
Krzysztof Rusinek	(Poland)	FW	0	0	0	0	5	1	15	5	20	6
Rafał Rzepecki	(Poland)	FW	0	0	0	0	0	0	8	2	8	2
Piotr Zagórski	(Poland)	FW	4	0	10	2	1	0	0	0	15	2
Marek Zawada	(Poland)	FW	0	0	0	0	15	2	0	0	15	2
Dzidosław Żuberek	(Poland)	FW	0	0	16	2	0	0	0	0	16	2

== Managerial statistics ==
This is a list of Lechia-Polonia Gdańsk managers and their statistics in all competitive competitions. This list includes caretaker managers, shown here in italics.

Name	Nat	From	To	G	W	D	L	%W
Witold Kulik	(Poland)	1 July 1998	30 June 1999	29	13	4	12	44.8%
Jerzy Jastrzębowski	(Poland)	1 July 1999	4 March 2000	27	9	7	11	33.3%
Wiesław Wika	(Poland)	5 March 2000	11 March 2000	1	1	0	0	100%
Romuald Szukiełowicz	(Poland)	12 March 2000	4 October 2000	34	12	9	13	35.2%
Stanisław Stachura	(Poland)	5 October 2000	30 June 2002	65	16	13	36	24.6%

== Kits ==
The kits worn by Lechia-Polonia during their four seasons of existence.

=== 1998–99 ===
The 1998–99 kits were produced by Uhlsport with Pomorskie Towarzystwo Leasingowe being the sponsor on the shirts.

1998–99 home kit	1998–99 away kit

=== 1999–2000 ===
Lechia-Polonia started the season with the same kits as the previous season, adding a third shirt which bore the sponsor Centertel. After the winter break Lechia dropped what they used as their home kit in favour of using one of the Kelme shirts used by Lechia Gdańsk between 1996 and 1998. The three kits made by three different manufacturers were used on a rotational basis, with the green and white "half and half" kit being used more often as it incorporated the most green and could be used against more opponents.

1999–2000 Uhlsport home	1999–2000 Uhlsport away	1999-2000 Third kit	1999–2000 Kelme kit

=== 2000–01 ===
In 2000 Adidas became the manufacturer of the Lechia-Polonia kits, with Centertel being the main club sponsor. Canal+ also held a minor sponsorship role, with a small logo also featuring on the front of the shirts. The two Adidas shirts were used interchangeably with neither kit having a preference as the "home shirt". Lechia-Polonia also used two previously used shirts, with the "half and half" shirt having the Canal+ logo placed above the Uhlsport logo removing any indication of who previously made the shirt.

2000-01 Adidas first	2000-01 Adidas second	2000-2001 third	2000–2001 fourth

=== 2001–02 ===
In the last year of Lechia-Polonia's existence they played in the same Adidas kits as the season before.

2000-01 Adidas first	2000-01 Adidas second
