= 1997–98 Ekstraklasa =

71st season of top-tier football league in Poland

Liga
- Season: 1997–98
- Champions: ŁKS Łódź (2nd title)
- Relegated: Petrochemia Płock; Groclin Grodzisk; KSZO Ostrowiec Świętokrzyski; Raków Częstochowa
- Matches: 306
- Goals: 729 (2.38 per match)
- Top goalscorer: Arkadiusz Bąk; Sylwester Czereszewski; Mariusz Śrutwa (14 goals)
- Average attendance: 4,352 ▲14.0%

Statistics of the Ekstraklasa for the 1997–98 season.

== Overview ==
18 teams competed in the 1997–98 season. ŁKS Łódź won the championship.

== League table ==
Pos	Team	Pld	W	D	L	GF	GA	GD	Pts	Qualification or relegation
1	ŁKS Łódź (C)	34	19	9	6	52	23	+29	66	Qualification to Champions League first qualifying round
2	Polonia Warsaw	34	18	9	7	46	30	+16	63	Qualification to UEFA Cup first qualifying round
3	Wisła Kraków	34	18	7	9	50	30	+20	61	Qualification to UEFA Cup first qualifying round
4	Widzew Łódź	34	18	7	9	53	34	+19	61	
5	Legia Warsaw	34	16	11	7	50	32	+18	59	
6	Ruch Chorzów	34	15	10	9	48	39	+9	55	Qualification to Intertoto Cup first round
7	Amica Wronki	34	13	11	10	38	31	+7	50	Qualification to Cup Winners' Cup qualifying round
8	Górnik Zabrze	34	12	12	10	48	42	+6	48	
9	Odra Wodzisław	34	14	6	14	51	50	+1	48	
10	Lech Poznań	34	12	10	12	41	37	+4	46	
11	Stomil Olsztyn	34	12	9	13	38	45	−7	45	
12	GKS Katowice	34	10	13	11	37	33	+4	43	
13	Zagłębie Lubin	34	12	7	15	39	40	−1	43	
14	Pogoń Szczecin	34	10	13	11	36	40	−4	43	
15	Petrochemia Płock (R)	34	10	8	16	28	54	−26	38	Relegated to II liga
16	Groclin Grodzisk (R)	34	8	5	21	30	55	−25	29	Relegated to II liga
17	KSZO Ostrowiec Świętokrzyski (R)	34	6	6	22	24	47	−23	24	Relegated to II liga
18	Raków Częstochowa (R)	34	4	5	25	21	68	−47	17	Relegated to II liga

Source: 90minut.pl (in Polish)
(C) Champions; (R) Relegated

== Results ==
Home \ Away	AMC	KAT	GÓR	DSK	KSZ	LPO	LEG	ŁKS	ODR	PPŁ	POG	PWA	RAK	RUC	STO	WID	WIS	ZLU
Amica Wronki		1–0	1–1	0–1	2–0	3–1	0–1	0–1	3–0	1–1	1–1	1–1	2–1	1–1	2–0	1–2	2–0	1–0
GKS Katowice	0–0		1–1	3–1	1–0	0–1	0–1	2–2	5–1	1–1	3–2	1–1	3–0	1–0	0–1	1–1	4–0	0–0
Górnik Zabrze	1–1	1–1		2–0	1–0	1–1	2–0	3–1	6–0	1–1	1–1	1–0	2–0	2–0	2–3	2–0	1–1	1–0
Dyskobolia	1–1	0–0	1–0		1–3	0–1	2–1	0–0	2–0	2–0	2–2	0–4	2–3	3–1	0–1	0–3	1–2	1–3
KSZO Ostrowiec	0–2	0–0	4–5	0–2		0–0	0–1	0–1	3–1	2–1	3–2	1–2	0–0	0–0	2–0	2–0	0–1	0–1
Lech Poznań	2–1	0–1	2–2	3–1	1–1		3–0	1–0	1–1	2–2	1–2	0–1	5–0	1–2	1–1	1–3	2–0	2–1
Legia Warsaw	2–0	2–0	4–0	1–0	3–1	0–0		1–1	0–1	3–0	1–1	1–1	2–0	3–3	4–1	3–1	1–0	2–0
ŁKS Łódź	2–0	0–0	2–0	0–0	3–0	0–2	3–0		2–0	5–0	1–1	2–0	2–1	0–0	3–1	2–3	0–1	1–0
Odra Wodzisław	1–2	3–1	3–1	2–0	3–2	1–0	1–3	1–2		0–0	0–1	3–1	3–2	5–0	4–0	1–1	1–1	0–1
Petrochemia Płock	1–0	1–0	1–1	1–0	1–0	1–0	1–2	1–1	1–6		1–0	2–2	0–1	1–3	2–1	1–0	3–0	2–0
Pogoń Szczecin	2–2	2–3	1–0	2–1	1–0	0–0	1–1	1–2	0–1	2–0		1–0	1–1	0–0	1–0	0–2	2–2	1–4
Polonia Warsaw	1–0	1–0	3–1	2–0	2–0	1–1	1–1	0–3	2–1	1–0	1–0		3–0	1–0	2–1	1–3	2–0	4–1
Raków Częstochowa	1–2	0–1	0–4	3–0	0–0	0–2	1–1	0–1	0–2	1–0	0–2	0–2		1–2	0–2	1–3	0–1	1–1
Ruch Chorzów	2–0	2–2	0–0	3–2	1–0	3–0	3–2	0–2	1–1	4–0	1–1	1–1	4–1		2–1	1–2	1–0	2–1
Stomil Olsztyn	0–1	1–0	1–1	2–1	2–0	3–2	1–1	1–3	2–2	2–1	2–1	1–1	3–1	3–0		0–1	0–3	0–0
Widzew Łódź	1–1	2–0	5–0	2–3	2–0	0–1	1–0	0–0	2–0	3–0	0–1	0–0	5–1	1–0	0–0		1–1	3–1
Wisła Kraków	1–1	2–0	2–1	1–0	1–0	2–0	2–2	1–0	1–2	5–0	3–0	3–0	3–0	0–1	0–0	6–0		2–1
Zagłębie Lubin	1–2	2–2	1–0	3–0	3–0	3–1	0–0	2–4	1–0	2–0	0–0	0–1	2–0	0–4	1–1	2–0	1–2	

Source: 90minut.pl (in Polish)
Legend: Blue = home team win; Yellow = draw; Red = away team win.

== Top goalscorers ==
Rank	Player	Club	Goals
1	(Poland) Arkadiusz Bąk	Polonia Warsaw	14
1	(Poland) Sylwester Czereszewski	Legia Warsaw	14
1	(Poland) Mariusz Śrutwa	Ruch Chorzów	14
4	(Poland) Radosław Jasiński	Zagłębie Lubin	13
5	(Poland) Marcin Kuźba	Górnik Zabrze	12
6	(Poland) Mariusz Nosal	Odra Wodzisław	11
6	(Poland) Piotr Reiss	Lech Poznań	11
6	(Poland) Marek Saganowski	ŁKS Łódź	11
9	(Poland) Paweł Kryszałowicz	Amica Wronki	10
9	(Poland) Tomasz Kulawik	Wisła Kraków	10
9	(Poland) Piotr Mandrysz	Pogoń Szczecin	10
9	(Poland) Paweł Miąszkiewicz	Petrochemia Płock	10
9	(Poland) Sławomir Wojciechowski	GKS Katowice	10

== Attendances ==
Club	Average
Ostrowiec Świętokrzyski	8,895
Wisła Kraków	8,088
Wisła Płock	5,982
Legia Warszawa	5,794
Pogoń Szczecin	5,735
Stomil Olsztyn	5,618
ŁKS	4,900
Odra Wodzisław Śląski	4,388
Widzew Łódź	3,890
Górnik Zabrze	3,808
Lech Poznań	3,768
Ruch Chorzów	3,753
GKS Katowice	2,829
Amica Wronki	2,794
Raków Częstochowa	2,324
Dyskobolia	2,300
Zagłębie Lubin	2,176
Polonia Warszawa	1,300
