= Adam Fedoruk =

Polish footballer (born 1966)

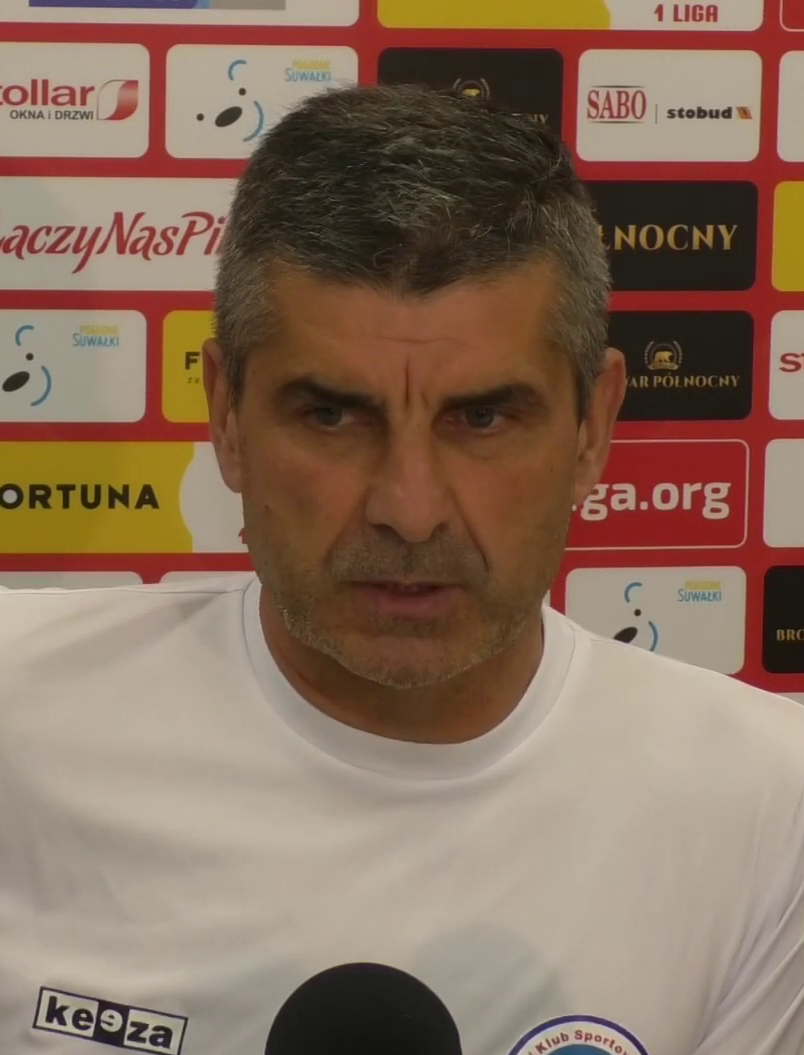

Personal information
- Full name: Adam Bogdan Fedoruk
- Date of birth: 11 December 1966 (age 59)
- Place of birth: Elbląg, Poland
- Position: Midfielder

Team information
- Current team: Granica Kętrzyn (youth coach)

Senior career*
Years	Team	Apps	(Gls)
1984–1985	Olimpia Elbląg		
1985–1993	Stal Mielec	240	(35)
1993–1995	Legia Warsaw	68	(17)
1995–1996	Amica Wronki	30	(5)
1996–1997	Raków Częstochowa	12	(1)
1997	Kavala	1	(0)
1997–1998	Zatoka Braniewo		
1998–1999	Lechia Gdańsk	15	(0)
1999	Pittsburgh Riverhounds		
1999–2000	Lechia Gdańsk	12	(2)
2000	Pittsburgh Riverhounds	15	(0)
2000–2001	Lechia Gdańsk	17	(2)
2001–2003	Olimpia Elbląg		

International career
1990–1994	Poland	18	(1)

Managerial career
- 2001–2003: Polonia Elbląg (player-manager)
- 2003–2004: Barkas Tolkmicko
- 2007: Zagłębie Lubin II
- 2011–2012: Barkas Tolkmicko
- 2012–2013: Huragan Morąg
- 2013–2014: Miedź Legnica
- 2014–2015: Mławianka Mława
- 2015–2016: Lechia Gdańsk II
- 2016–2017: Karpaty Krosno
- 2018–2019: Mławianka Mława
- 2019: Wigry Suwałki
- 2020–2024: Granica Kętrzyn
- 2024–: Granica Kętrzyn (youth)
- * Club domestic league appearances and goals

Adam Bogdan Fedoruk (born 11 December 1966) is a Polish football coach and former player who manages Polish club Granica Kętrzyn's youth teams.

== Career ==
Fedoruk played club football for Olimpia Elbląg, Stal Mielec, Legia Warsaw, Amica Wronki, Raków Częstochowa, Kavala, Zatoka Braniewo, Lechia Gdańsk and the Pittsburgh Riverhounds. Between 1990 and 1994, Fedoruk made 18 international appearances for Poland, scoring one goal.

== Honours ==
=== Player ===
Legia Warsaw

- Ekstraklasa: 1993–94, 1994–95
- Polish Cup: 1993–94, 1994–95

=== Player-manager ===
Polonia Elbląg

- IV liga Warmia-Masuria: 2001–02
- Polish Cup (Warmia-Masuria regionals): 2001–02, 2002–03

=== Manager ===
Mławianka Mława

- Polish Cup (Ciechanów-Ostrołęka regionals): 2014–15

Karpaty Krosno

- Polish Cup (Krosno regionals): 2016–17
