= Radosław Jasiński =

Polish footballer

Personal information
- Full name: Radosław Jasiński
- Date of birth: 9 October 1971 (age 55)
- Place of birth: Trzebnica, Poland
- Height: 1.80 m (5 ft 11 in)
- Position: Forward

Senior career*
Years	Team	Apps	(Gls)
1989–1990	Iskra Pasikurowice		
1990–1998	Zagłębie Lubin	164	(38)
1991–1992	→ Chrobry Głogów (loan)		
1996	→ Zawisza Bydgoszcz (loan)		
1998–1999	Paniliakos	21	(0)
1999–2000	Zagłębie Lubin	20	(2)
2000	Dyskobolia Grodzisk Wielkopolski	3	(0)
2001	Ruch Radzionków	4	(0)
2001–2003	Górnik Polkowice		
2003	Polar Wrocław	16	(1)
2004	Świt Nowy Dwór Mazowiecki	9	(0)
2004–2007	Kania Gostyń		
2007	GKS Kobierzyce		
2008–2009	Odra Wrocław		
2009–2011	GKS Kobierzyce		
2012–2014	Orzeł Pawłowice		
2015–2018	Polonia Jaszowice		

Managerial career
- Orzeł Pawłowice
- 2014–2021: Polonia Jaszowice
- * Club domestic league appearances and goals

Radosław Jasiński (born 9 October 1971) is a Polish former professional footballer who played as a forward.

== Club career ==
Jasiński began his career with Zagłębie Lubin, a club for whom he would play several seasons in the Polish Ekstraklasa. He had a spell with Paniliakos in the Super League Greece.

== Honours ==
Górnik Polkowice

- II liga: 2002–03
