= Krzysztof Rusinek =

Polish footballer

Personal information
- Full name: Krzysztof Rusinek
- Date of birth: 31 July 1981 (age 45)
- Place of birth: Gdańsk, Poland
- Height: 1.79 m (5 ft 10 in)
- Position: Forward

Team information
- Current team: Tylko Lechia Gdańsk (caretaker)

Youth career
- –2000: Lechia Gdańsk

Senior career*
Years	Team	Apps	(Gls)
2000–2002	Lechia-Polonia Gdańsk	20	(6)
2002–2003	Arka Gdynia	28	(3)
2003–2004	Gryf Wejherowo		
2004–2006	Lechia Gdańsk	60	(13)
2007	Śląsk Wrocław	6	(0)
2007–2008	GKS Jastrzębie	23	(2)
2008–2009	Kotwica Kołobrzeg	34	(8)
2009	Flota Świnoujście	13	(1)
2010	Olimpia Grudziądz	13	(1)
2010	Chojniczanka Chojnice	12	(2)
2011–2012	Cartusia Kartuzy	43	(8)
2012–2013	Kaszubia Kościerzyna	30	(0)
2013–2016	Bałtyk Gdynia	68	(19)
2016–2021	GTS Goszyn	68	(3)
2023–2025	Tylko Lechia Gdańsk	50	(45)

Managerial career
- 2017–2019: GTS Goszyn (player-manager)
- 2026–: Tylko Lechia Gdańsk (caretaker)
- * Club domestic league appearances and goals

Krzysztof Rusinek (born 31 July 1981) is a Polish football manager and former professional player who played as a forward. He is currently the caretaker manager of regional league club Tylko Lechia Gdańsk.

During his playing career, he was never prolific, scoring roughly only once every six games, however he continued to feature for many teams in the second and third Polish divisions. Despite never managing to play in the Ekstraklasa, Poland's top footballing division, he spent many seasons in the I liga, playing a total of 127 appearances and scoring 11 goals in the second tier. He notably played in the I liga with Lechia-Polonia Gdańsk, Arka Gdynia, Lechia Gdańsk, Śląsk Wrocław, GKS Jastrzębie, and Flota Świnoujście.

== Career ==
=== Playing ===
Rusinek started his footballing career with Lechia Gdańsk, progressing to the first team (then known as Lechia-Polonia Gdańsk) in 2000. Rusinek's professional debut came on 9 August 2000 in a Polish Cup game against Polonia Lidzbark Warmiński, Rusinek coming off the bench in the second half and scoring 2 goals as Lechia beat Polonia 4–1. In his first season with the first team Rusinek went on to make 5 more appearances in the league, and scored one league goal. During his second season with Lechia-Polonia Rusinek became a more important player within the first team. He made 15 league appearances and scored 5 league goals during the 2001–02 season in which Lechia-Polonia struggled and faced relegation to the IV liga. At the end of the season Lechia-Polonia were dissolved, leading to Rusinek's contract being terminated.

Rusinek opted to join Lechia's main rivals, Arka Gdynia, for the 2002–03 season. He made his Arka debut and scored his first Arka goal on 3 August 2002, playing against Hetman Zamość. Despite the strong start with Arka, he would only go on to score 2 more goals in the next 27 league appearances during the rest of the season. At the end of the season Rusinek joined Gryf Wejherowo. While it is not known how many games he made with Gryf over the season it is known that he was one of the leagues highest goal scorers, scoring 11 goals during his time with the club.

In 2004 Rusinek returned to Lechia Gdańsk, who had been promoted from the lowest tiers in Polish football to the third tier. In his first season back with the club the team won the III liga, ensuring promotion to the second division. In this first season Rusinek scored 10 league goals in 21 appearances. The following two seasons were spent with Lechia in the II liga, going on to make a further 39 appearances and scoring 3 goals in the second tier. After leaving Lechia for a second time at the end of 2006, he had made a total of 86 appearances and scored 22 goals in all competitions. He left Lechia to join fellow II liga team Śląsk Wrocław during the January transfer window. Rusinek made only 6 appearances for Śląsk before leaving the club in the summer.

During the summer of 2007 he joined newly promoted II liga team GKS Jastrzębie for the season. While it was a good season for Jastrzębie, who finished mid-table to confirm their place in the league, Rusinek struggled with only 2 goals in 23 appearances. After only one season with Jastrzębie Rusinek left to join Kotwica Kołobrzeg in the III liga. After a few seasons of struggling to find the net, moving down a division helped Rusinek find form, scoring 8 goals in 34 league appearances. Once again however the move did not last long and by the end of the season Rusinek had left to join a new club. In 2009 he joined Flota Świnoujście, making 13 appearances and scoring 1 goal before leaving during the winter transfer window, moving to Olimpia Grudziądz, also making 13 appearances and scoring only 1 goal. His next move saw him playing with Chojniczanka Chojnice, however this move lasted only 6 months before he was once again playing for a new team, this time with Cartusia Kartuzy. At Cartusia he did however find some stability, spending the next 18 months with the team, and making a total of 43 appearances and 8 goals with the club. He spent a season with Kaszubia Kościerzyna before spending three seasons with Bałtyk Gdynia. The final move of his career came in 2016 when he joined GTS Goszyn, spending 5 seasons with the club before retiring from playing football in 2021. He resumed play in 2023, joining a new-found Klasa B club Tylko Lechia Gdańsk.

=== Coaching ===
In 2013 Rusinek first moved into coaching, taking his first role with Sparta Gdańsk and training the Under 10's. Rusinek has gone on to hold various youth couching roles with GTS Pruszcz Gdański since 2016.

Rusinek became the manager of GTS Zielke Goszyn in 2017, leading the club to promotion from the B Klasa in the first few months of taking on the role. He left his managerial role at Zielke in 2019.

== Honours ==
Lechia Gdańsk

- III liga, gr. II: 2004–05

Kaszubia Kościerzyna

- IV liga Pomerania: 2012–13

GTS Zielke Goszyn

- Klasa A Gdańsk II: 2019–20
- Klasa B Gdańsk III: 2016–17

Tylko Lechia Gdańsk

- Klasa B Gdańsk II: 2023–24
