= Paweł Miąszkiewicz =

Polish footballer

Personal information
- Date of birth: 25 November 1971 (age 54)
- Place of birth: Warsaw, Poland
- Height: 1.71 m (5 ft 7 in)
- Position: Midfielder

Youth career
- Sarmata Warsaw

Senior career*
Years	Team	Apps	(Gls)
1988	Olimpia Warsaw		
1989–1991	Gwardia Warsaw		
1991–1994	Widzew Łódź	70	(8)
1994–1995	Petrochemia Płock	22	(1)
1995–1997	Widzew Łódź	51	(12)
1997–1998	Petrochemia Płock	30	(10)
1998	GKS Katowice	12	(3)
1999–2001	Orlen Płock		
2001–2002	Świt Nowy Dwór		
2002–2003	Gwardia Warsaw		
2003–2004	Unia Skierniewice		
2004–2006	Nadnarwianka Pułtusk		
2007	Huragan Wołomin		
2008–2012	Victoria Sulejówek		
- * Club domestic league appearances and goals

Paweł Miąszkiewicz (born 25 November 1971) is a Polish former footballer who played as a midfielder.

== Honours ==
Widzew Łódź

- Ekstraklasa: 1995–96, 1996–97
- Polish Super Cup: 1996
