= Supraślanka Supraśl =

Polish football club

- Full name: Miejski Klub Sportowy; Supraślanka Supraśl
- Founded: 1934; 91 years ago
- Ground: Supraśl Stadium
- Capacity: 1,000
- Chairman: Przemysław Danielewicz
- Manager: Dawid Ostaszewski
- League: Klasa A Podlasie II
- 2023–24: Klasa A Podlasie II, 5th of 10

Miejski Klub Sportowy Supraślanka Supraśl is a football club from Supraśl, Poland. It was founded in 1934. They're currently playing in Klasa A, the seventh level of competition.

Supraślanka participated in the qualifying round of the 2005–06 Polish Cup, where the club lost to OKS 1945 Olsztyn, and in the preliminary round of the 2008–09 Polish Cup, where they lost to Lechia Gdańsk II.
