= SKS Stoczniowiec Gdańsk =

Polish football club

Stoczniowiec Gdańsk
- Full name: Stoczniowy Klub Sportowy Stoczniowiec Gdańsk
- Nickname: Stoczniowcy (The Shipbuilders)
- Founded: 27 September 1945; 80 years ago (as KS Nit Gdańsk)
- Ground: Polonia Gdańsk Stadium
- Chairman: Łukasz Jeżewski
- Manager: Paweł Pagieła
- League: Regional league Gdańsk I
- 2024–25: Regional league Gdańsk I, 6th of 16
- Website: stoczniowiecgdansk.pl/
Home colours	Away colours

SKS Stoczniowiec Gdańsk is a football club based in Gdańsk, Poland. It spent a large part of its history as Polonia Gdańsk.

The club was founded in 1945 and currently plays in the Gdańsk regional divisions. It is best known for its period of success in the 1970s which saw the club play in the Polish Cup semifinal and almost achieve promotion to the top flight of Polish football, and for a merger with Lechia Gdańsk creating the Lechia-Polonia Gdańsk team which played between 1998 and 2002.

== History ==
The club was founded on 27 September 1945 as KS Nit Gdańsk, and in several seasons were known as Stal Gdańsk. In the early years, the team played in the lower regional divisions of Polish football. During the 1960s, they played in the third tier, often fighting for promotion. By this point, the team was known as ZKS Polonia Gdańsk. In 1970, Polonia merged with RKS Stocznia Północna, creating RKS Stoczniowiec Gdańsk. The team finally achieved promotion to the second division in 1973 after winning their division, and finishing the previous season as runners-up. The 1970s saw the high point in the team's history. Stoczniowiec enjoyed nine seasons in the second division before being relegated in 1982. The team's greatest achievement so far came in the 1976–77 season, when it finished 3rd, just missing out on promotion to the top division.

From 1982 to 1998, Polonia experienced another three seasons in the second tier, each time only lasting in the division for one season. The team won the third tier thrice during this period, as well as finishing runners-up a further five times.

1998 saw a merger with Lechia Gdańsk, to create Lechia-Polonia Gdańsk. This merger saw an independent, and continuous team from that of the one founded in 1945 playing in the fifth tier, while Lechia/Polonia competed in the second division. The Lechia/Polonia team ceased to exist from 2001, forcing both teams to start from the bottom tier of Polish football.

Polonia's fortunes never returned, and the team has since been playing in the lower divisions ever since. The highest the team has achieved since the turn of the century was two seasons in the third division, finishing 14th and 16th from 2012 to 2014. Back to back relegations meant that Stoczniowiec returned to the fifth tier once again, and currently find themselves playing in Gdańsk I group of the regional league. In 2020 the team returned to the "Stoczniowiec Gdańsk" name.

=== Historical names ===
- 1945: KS Nit Gdańsk
- 1950s: Stal Gdańsk
- 1960s: ZKS Polonia Gdańsk
- 1970: RKS Stoczniowiec Gdańsk
- 1992: SKS Polonia Gdańsk
- 2020: SKS Stoczniowiec Gdańsk

== Colours ==
Home kit when the club played under the name Polonia Gdańsk

The clubs kit and badge colours have changed over the years. With the team playing under the name Stoczniowiec being linked more with the colour blue, the team was linked more with the colours red and white under the name Polonia.

Currently the home colours are blue, while the away colours are red. The colour blue is linked to the close association with the shipyards and docks in Gdańsk with the clubs name “Stoczniowiec” meaning “shipyard”. The red away colour comes from when the team were known as “Polonia”, the Latinised name for Poland, so the team used the colours of the Polish flag. While under the name Stoczniowiec the away kit has been all red, whereas under the name Polonia the home kit was red shirts and socks with white shorts, while the away kit was generally the opposite of the home kit, such as white shirts and socks with red shorts, with an all blue kit also being used as the clubs away kit while under the name "Polonia".

== Honours ==
- Polish Cup
  - Semi-finalists: 1975–76
  - Quarter-finalists: 1955–56

Second tier

- II liga (northern group)
  - Third place: 1976–77

Third tier

- III liga (group IV)
  - Champions: 1972–73
- III liga (group II)
  - Champions: 1986–87
  - Runners-up: 1982–83, 1984–85, 1985–86, 1988–89
- III liga (Gdańsk group)
  - Champions: 1994–95, 1996–97

Fifth tier

- IV liga (Gdańsk group)
  - Runners-up: 1998–99
- IV liga (Gdańsk group I)
  - Runners-up: 2004–05
  - Third place: 2003–04
- IV liga (Pomeranian group)
  - Champions: 2011–12

Sixth tier

- Liga okręgowa (Gdańsk group I)
  - Champions: 2010–11
  - Runners-up: 2008–09
  - Third place: 2015–16

== See also ==
- Gdańsk Derby
- Sport in Gdańsk
