= 2018–19 Lechia Gdańsk season =

Lechia Gdańsk
2018–19 season
- Manager: Piotr Stokowiec
- Stadium: Stadion Energa Gdańsk
- Ekstraklasa: 3rd
- Polish Cup: Winners
- Top goalscorer: League: Flávio Paixão (15 Goals); All: Flávio Paixão (15 Goals)
- Highest home attendance: 25,066 vs Arka Gdynia
- Lowest home attendance: 8,769 vs Wisła Płock
- Average home league attendance: 14,746
Home colours	Away colours

The 2018–19 Lechia Gdańsk season is the club's 75th season of existence, and their 11th continuous in the top flight of Polish football. The season covered the period from 1 July 2018 to 30 June 2019.

== Season information ==
Kit worn for Lechia vs Pogoń Szczecin, 9 February 2019

On 9 February 2019 Lechia wore their first ever non-green or non-white kit for a home match in the Ekstraklasa. The team wore an all black kit in respect to Paweł Adamowicz, the mayor of Gdańsk, who was a lifelong Lechia fan who was murdered on 14 January 2019.

== Players ==
=== First Team Squad ===
Note: Flags indicate national team as defined under FIFA eligibility rules; some limited exceptions apply. Players may hold more than one non-FIFA nationality.

No.	Pos.	Nation	Player
1	GK	SRB	Zlatan Alomerović
3	DF	POR	João Nunes
4	DF	POL	Adam Chrzanowski (substituted off)
5	DF	CAN	Steven Vitória
6	MF	POL	Jarosław Kubicki
8	MF	POL	Michał Mak
9	MF	POL	Patryk Lipski
10	MF	IDN	Egy Maulana
11	MF	POL	Konrad Michalak
12	GK	SVK	Dušan Kuciak
16	MF	POL	Ariel Borysiuk (substituted off)
17	MF	SVK	Lukáš Haraslín
18	FW	POL	Jakub Arak
19	MF	POL	Karol Fila
20	MF	POL	Daniel Mikołajewski
21	MF	POL	Sławomir Peszko (substituted off)
22	DF	SRB	Filip Mladenović

No.	Pos.	Nation	Player
23	DF	POL	Grzegorz Wojtkowiak
25	DF	POL	Michał Nalepa
26	DF	POL	Błażej Augustyn
27	MF	POL	Rafał Wolski
28	MF	POR	Flávio Paixão
29	FW	POL	Mateusz Żukowski
33	DF	POL	Mateusz Lewandowski
35	MF	POL	Daniel Łukasik
36	MF	POL	Tomasz Makowski
41	DF	POL	Paweł Stolarski (substituted off)
45	MF	POL	Mateusz Cegiełka (substituted in)
55	DF	POL	Filip Dymerski (substituted in)
71	GK	POL	Maciej Woźniak
80	MF	POL	Mateusz Sopoćko
90	FW	POL	Artur Sobiech
99	FW	POL	Przemysław Macierzyński

Key

Symbol	Meaning
Substituted in	Player arrived during the winter transfer window.
Substituted off	Player left at any point during the season after making an appearance for the first team.

=== Out on loan ===
Note: Flags indicate national team as defined under FIFA eligibility rules; some limited exceptions apply. Players may hold more than one non-FIFA nationality.

No.	Pos.	Nation	Player
77	DF	POL	Rafał Kobryń (at SV Straelen from 24 July 2018 until 30 June 2019)
8	FW	GNB	Romário Baldé (at Académica Coimbra from 31 August 2018 until 30 June 2019)
31	MF	POL	Florian Schikowski (at SV Straelen from 31 August 2018 until 30 June 2019)
—	DF	POL	Adam Chrzanowski (at Gryf Wejherowo from 8 January 2019 until 30 June 2019)
—	FW	POL	Przemysław Macierzyński (at Gryf Wejherowo from 11 January 2019 until 30 June 2019)
16	MF	POL	Ariel Borysiuk (at Wisła Płock from 17 January 2019 until 30 June 2019)
21	MF	POL	Sławomir Peszko (at Wisła Kraków from 25 January 2019 until 30 June 2019)

=== Transfers ===
==== In ====
No.	Pos.	Player	From	Type	Window	Fee	Date	Source
1	GK	Zlatan Alomerović	Korona Kielce	Transfer	Summer	Free	1 July 2018	
6	MF	Jarosław Kubicki	Zagłębie Lubin	Transfer	Summer	Free	1 July 2018	
10	MF	Egy Maulana	SKO Ragunan	Transfer	Summer	Free	8 July 2018	
90	FW	Artur Sobiech	SV Darmstadt 98	Transfer	Summer	Free	10 August 2018	
11	MF	Konrad Michalak	Legia Warsaw	Transfer	Summer	Player Swap	15 August 2018	
45	MF	Mateusz Cegiełka	Stomil Olsztyn	Transfer	Winter	Free	11 January 2019	
55	DF	Filip Dymerski	Naki Olsztyn	Transfer	Winter	Free	12 January 2019	
		7 players				€0k		

==== Out ====
No.	Pos.	Player	To	Type	Window	Fee	Date	Source
19	FW	Marco Paixão	Altay S.K.	Transfer	Summer	Free	1 July 2018	
-	DF	Mario Maloča	SpVgg Greuther Fürth	Transfer	Summer	Free	1 July 2018	
41	DF	Paweł Stolarski	Legia Warsaw	Transfer	Summer	Player Swap	15 August 2018	
3	DF	Jakub Wawrzyniak	GKS Katowice	Transfer	Summer	Free	16 August 2018	
8	FW	Romário Baldé	Académica Coimbra	Loan	Summer	Free	31 August 2018	
11	FW	Grzegorz Kuświk	Stal Mielec	Transfer	Summer	Free	10 September 2018	
4	DF	Adam Chrzanowski	Wigry Suwałki	Loan	Winter	Free	8 January 2019	
16	MF	Ariel Borysiuk	Wisła Płock	Loan	Winter	Free	17 January 2019	
21	MF	Sławomir Peszko	Wisła Kraków	Loan	Winter	Free	26 January 2019	
		11 players				€0k		

==== Retired ====
No.	Pos.	Player	Date
7	MF	Miloš Krasić	1 December 2018

== Competitions ==
=== Friendlies ===
==== Summer ====
24 June 2018	Lechia Gdańsk	1–2	APOEL FC	Gdańsk
14:00 BST	Mateusz Żukowski 65'		Lucas Souza 12'; Mickaël Poté 35'	Stadium: Stadion Energa Gdańsk

29 June 2018	Lechia Gdańsk	1–0	Bytovia Bytów	Władysławowo
14:00 BST	Flávio Paixão 90'			Stadium: Stadion Lekkoatletyczny COS OPO Cetniewo

30 June 2018	Lechia Gdańsk	5–1	Chojniczanka Chojnice	Władysławowo
11:00 BST	Błażej Augustyn 10'; Flávio Paixão 15' (pen.); Lukáš Haraslín 36'; Mateusz Sopoćko 51'; Przemysław Macierzyński 76'		Wojciech Trochim 89'	Stadium: Stadion Lekkoatletyczny COS OPO Cetniewo

6 July 2018	Lechia Gdańsk	2–1	Pogoń Szczecin	Wronki
14:00 BST	Filip Mladenović 43'; Jarosław Kubicki 65'		Soufian Benyamina 36'	Stadium: Amika Wronki Stadium

7 July 2018	Lechia Gdańsk	3–0	Železiarne Podbrezová	Szamotuły
11:00 BST	Patryk Lipski 44'; Lukáš Haraslín 83'; Flávio Paixão 85'			Stadium: Stadion SOSiR

13 July 2018	Lechia Gdańsk	0–1	Asteras Tripolis	Gdańsk
14:00 BST			Konstantinos Triantafyllopoulos 45'	Stadium: Stadion Energa Gdańsk

14 July 2018	Gryf Słupsk	2–1	Lechia Gdańsk	Słupsk
12:00 BST	Michał Szałek 57'; Łukasz Stasiak 67'		Karol Fila 80'	Stadium: Stadion 650-lecia

9 September 2018	Lechia Gdańsk	0–1	Karpaty Lviv	Gdańsk
18:30 BST			Ponde 23' (pen.)	Stadium: Stadion Energa Gdańsk

13 October 2018	Klub Pilkarski Starogard	1–1	Lechia Gdańsk	Starogard Gdański
11:00 BST	Przemysław Kuss 74'		Steven Vitória 7'	Stadium: Stadion Miejski im. Kazimierza Deyny

==== Winter ====
15 January 2019	Lechia Gdańsk	Cancelled	Bytovia Bytów	Gdańsk
16:00 BST				Stadium: MOSiR Stadium (Gdańsk)

21 January 2019	FC Viitorul Constanța	1–2	Lechia Gdańsk	Belek, Turkey
16:00 BST	Ianis Hagi 23'		Mateusz Żukowski 8'; Patryk Lipski 44'	Stadium: IC Hotels Football Center - Pitch A

25 January 2019	PFC Ludogorets Razgrad	0–1	Lechia Gdańsk	Belek, Turkey
14:30 BST			Mateusz Żukowski 73'	Stadium: IC Hotels Football Center - Pitch A

28 January 2019	Odense Boldklub	2–0	Lechia Gdańsk	Belek, Turkey
14:00 BST	Bashkim Kadrii 40', 68'			Stadium: IC Hotels Football Center - Pitch A

1 February 2019	Suwon Samsung Bluewings	0–3	Lechia Gdańsk	Belek, Turkey
14:00 BST			Flávio Paixão 18', 31'; Artur Sobiech 74'	Stadium: IC Hotels Football Center - Pitch A

10 February 2019	Lechia Gdańsk	1–3	Olimpia Grudziądz	Gdańsk
BST	Michał Mak 14'		Przemysław Kita 11', 40'; Robert Ziętarski 26'	Stadium: MOSiR Stadium (Gdańsk)

=== Ekstraklasa ===
==== Regular season ====
20 July 2018 1	Jagiellonia Białystok	0–1	Lechia Gdańsk	Białystok
19:30 BST	Guilherme Sityá (red card) 68'		Flávio Paixão 10'; Sławomir Peszko (red card) 90+2'	Stadium: Białystok City Stadium; Attendance: 11,766

27 July 2018 2	Lechia Gdańsk	1–1	Śląsk Wrocław	Gdańsk
17:00 BST	Flávio Paixão 12' (pen.)		Piotr Celeban 68'	Stadium: Stadion Energa Gdańsk; Attendance: 14,068

4 August 2018 3	Legia Warsaw	0–0	Lechia Gdańsk	Warsaw
19:30 BST				Stadium: Polish Army Stadium; Attendance: 21,932

10 August 2018 4	Lechia Gdańsk	2–0	Miedź Legnica	Gdańsk
17:00 BST	Jakub Arak 39'; Patryk Lipski 56'			Stadium: Stadion Energa Gdańsk; Attendance: 11,053

18 August 2018 5	Górnik Zabrze	0–2	Lechia Gdańsk	Zabrze
19:30 BST			Paweł Bochniewicz 23 (OG)'; Flávio Paixão 33'	Stadium: Ernest Pohl Stadium; Attendance: 14,087

25 August 2018 6	Pogoń Szczecin	2–3	Lechia Gdańsk	Szczecin
17:00 BST	Kamil Drygas 42', 66' (pen.)		Lukáš Haraslín 49'; Steven Vitória 54'; Adam Chrzanowski 69'	Stadium: Stadion Florian Krygier; Attendance: 4,699

31 August 2018 7	Lechia Gdańsk	2–0	Korona Kielce	Gdańsk
19:30 BST	Flávio Paixão 25' (pen.)			Stadium: Stadion Energa Gdańsk; Attendance: 13,872

15 September 2018 8	Wisła Kraków	5–2	Lechia Gdańsk	Kraków
19:30 BST	Zdeněk Ondrášek 18'; Jakub Bartkowski 45+1'; Dawid Kort 64'; Kamil Wojtkowski 75'; Rafał Boguski 83'		Patryk Lipski 6'; Flávio Paixão 38' (pen.)	Stadium: Stadion Miejski; Attendance: 23,052

22 September 2018 9	Lechia Gdańsk	3–3	Zagłębie Lubin	Gdańsk
17:00 BST	Artur Sobiech 8', 15', 25'		Damjan Bohar 61'; Filip Starzyński 71' (pen.); Jakub Mareš 90+1'	Stadium: Stadion Energa Gdańsk; Attendance: 11,371

28 September 2018 10	Wisła Płock	1–0	Lechia Gdańsk	Płock
17:00 BST	Karol Angielski 75'			Stadium: Kazimierz Górski Stadium; Attendance: 3,123

6 October 2018 11	Lechia Gdańsk	4–1	Zagłębie Sosnowiec	Gdańsk
17:00 BST	Patryk Lipski 8', 63'; Jarosław Kubicki 45+1'; Flávio Paixão 50' (pen.)		Vamara Sanogo 23'	Stadium: Stadion Energa Gdańsk; Attendance: 10,023

19 October 2018 12	Piast Gliwice	1–1	Lechia Gdańsk	Gliwice
17:00 BST	Aleksandar Sedlar 29' (pen.)		Lukáš Haraslín 86'	Stadium: Stadion Piast; Attendance: 3,853

27 October 2018 13	Lechia Gdańsk	2–1	Arka Gdynia	Gdańsk
19:00 BST	Błażej Augustyn 26'; Flávio Paixão 90'		Michał Janota 37' (pen.); Tadeusz Socha (red card) 65'	Stadium: Stadion Energa Gdańsk; Attendance: 25,066

4 November 2018 14	Lech Poznań	0–1	Lechia Gdańsk	Poznań
17:00 BST			Flávio Paixão 26'	Stadium: Stadion Miejski; Attendance: 8,059

10 November 2018 15	Lechia Gdańsk	1–0	Cracovia	Gdańsk
17:00 BST	Flávio Paixão 79'			Stadium: Stadion Energa Gdańsk; Attendance: 17,089

25 November 2018 16	Lechia Gdańsk	3–2	Jagiellonia Białystok	Gdańsk
17:00 BST	Flávio Paixão 37' (pen.); Jarosław Kubicki 45'; Michał Nalepa 67'		Marko Poletanović 39'; Arvydas Novikovas 53'	Stadium: Stadion Energa Gdańsk; Attendance: 11,931

30 November 2018 17	Śląsk Wrocław	0–2	Lechia Gdańsk	Wrocław
17:00 BST			Michał Nalepa 15'; Lukáš Haraslín 25'	Stadium: Stadion Miejski; Attendance: 6,860

9 December 2018 18	Lechia Gdańsk	0–0	Legia Warsaw	Gdańsk
17:00 BST				Stadium: Stadion Energa Gdańsk; Attendance: 20,856

17 December 2018 19	Miedź Legnica	0–0	Lechia Gdańsk	Legnica
17:00 BST				Stadium: Stadion im. Orła Białego; Attendance: 4,521

22 December 2018 20	Lechia Gdańsk	4–0	Górnik Zabrze	Gdańsk
17:00 BST	Artur Sobiech 14'; Rafał Wolski 51'; Filip Mladenović 55'; Flávio Paixão 72'			Stadium: Stadion Energa Gdańsk; Attendance: 12,852

9 February 2019 21	Lechia Gdańsk	2–1	Pogoń Szczecin	Gdańsk
19:30 BST	Filip Mladenović 8'; Flávio Paixão 75'		Kamil Drygas 55'	Stadium: Stadion Energa Gdańsk; Attendance: 13,184

16 February 2019 22	Korona Kielce	0–0	Lechia Gdańsk	Kielce
19:30 BST				Stadium: Kielce City Stadium; Attendance: 7,529

23 February 2019 23	Lechia Gdańsk	1–0	Wisła Kraków	Gdańsk
19:30 BST	Filip Mladenović 41'			Stadium: Stadion Energa Gdańsk; Attendance: 10,069

4 March 2019 24	Zagłębie Lubin	2–1	Lechia Gdańsk	Lubin
17:00 BST	Filip Starzyński 28' (pen.); Damjan Bohar 82'		Jarosław Kubicki 41'	Stadium: Stadion Zagłębia Lubin; Attendance: 4,053

11 March 2019 25	Lechia Gdańsk	1–1	Wisła Płock	Gdańsk
17:00 BST	Flávio Paixão 77' (pen.)		Alan Uryga 52'	Stadium: Stadion Energa Gdańsk; Attendance: 8,736

16 March 2019 26	Zagłębie Sosnowiec	0–1	Lechia Gdańsk	Sosnowiec
17:00 BST			Daniel Łukasik 8'	Stadium: Stadion Ludowy; Attendance: 2,624

29 March 2019 27	Lechia Gdańsk	2–0	Piast Gliwice	Gdańsk
19:30 BST	Błażej Augustyn 6'; Michał Nalepa 33'			Stadium: Stadion Energa Gdańsk; Attendance: 15,073

2 April 2019 28	Arka Gdynia	0–0	Lechia Gdańsk	Gdynia
19:30 BST				Stadium: Stadion GOSiR; Attendance: 10,012

6 April 2019 29	Lechia Gdańsk	1–0	Lech Poznań	Gdańsk
19:30 BST	Artur Sobiech 10'			Stadium: Stadion Energa Gdańsk; Attendance: 19,016

13 April 2019 30	Cracovia	4–2	Lechia Gdańsk	Kraków
17:00 BST	Airam Cabrera 35' (pen.), 59'; Filip Piszczek 50'; Javi Hernández 70'		Flávio Paixão 17'; Patryk Lipski 87'	Stadium: Marshal Józef Piłsudski Stadium; Attendance: 10,765

===== League table =====
Pos	Team	Pld	W	D	L	GF	GA	GD	Pts	Qualification
1	Lechia Gdańsk	30	17	9	4	45	25	+20	60 (Note: Head-to-head record: Legia Warsaw 0–0 Lechia Gdańsk, Lechia Gdańsk 0–0 Legia Warsaw. Goal difference: Lechia Gdańsk (+20), Legia Warsaw (+17))	Qualification for the Championship round
2	Legia Warsaw	30	18	6	6	48	31	+17	60	Qualification for the Championship round
3	Piast Gliwice	30	15	8	7	47	31	+16	53	Qualification for the Championship round
4	Cracovia	30	14	6	10	39	34	+5	48	Qualification for the Championship round
5	Zagłębie Lubin	30	14	5	11	48	38	+10	47 (Note: Head-to-head record: Zagłębie Lubin 0–2 Jagiellonia Białystok, Jagiellonia Białystok 0–4 Zagłębie Lubin.)	Qualification for the Championship round

Source: Ekstraklasa, 90minut
Rules for classification: 1) Points; 2) Head-to-head points; 3) Head-to-head goal difference; 4) Head-to-head goals scored; 5) Head-to-head away goals scored (only if two teams); 6) Goal difference; 7) Goals scored; 8) Fairplay ranking; 9) Draw. (Note: Head-to-head record is used only after all the matches between the teams in question have been played.)

==== Championship round ====
20 April 2019 31	Lechia Gdańsk	0–2	Piast Gliwice	Gdańsk
14:30 BST			Piotr Parzyszek 29'; Jorge Félix 90+5'	Stadium: Stadion Energa Gdańsk; Attendance: 13,965

24 April 2019 32	Pogoń Szczecin	3–4	Lechia Gdańsk	Szczecin
17:00 BST	Sebastian Walukiewicz 52'; Zvonimir Kožulj 80', 83'		Konrad Michalak 73'; Artur Sobiech 71', 89'; Patryk Lipski 84'	Stadium: Stadion Florian Krygier; Attendance: 4,155

27 April 2019 33	Lechia Gdańsk	1–3	Legia Warsaw	Gdańsk
19:30 BST	Lukáš Haraslín 17'		Paweł Stolarski 61'; Kasper Hämäläinen 80'; Iuri Medeiros 90+3'	Stadium: Stadion Energa Gdańsk; Attendance: 25,000

5 May 2019 34	Cracovia	2–0	Lechia Gdańsk	Kraków
17:00 BST	Sergiu Hanca 74' (pen.); Milan Dimun 82'			Stadium: Marshal Józef Piłsudski Stadium; Attendance: 8,224

12 May 2019 35	Lechia Gdańsk	1–1	Zagłębie Lubin	Gdańsk
17:00 BST	Michał Mak 77'		Ľubomír Guldan 44'	Stadium: Stadion Energa Gdańsk; Attendance: 12,511

15 May 2019 36	Lech Poznań	2–1	Lechia Gdańsk	Poznań
19:30 BST	Błażej Augustyn 60 (OG)'; Darko Jevtić 90+3'		Michał Mak 71'	Stadium: Stadion Miejski; Attendance: 7,516

19 May 2019 37	Lechia Gdańsk	2–0	Jagiellonia Białystok	Gdańsk
17:00 BST	Karol Fila 44'; Jarosław Kubicki 73'			Stadium: Stadion Energa Gdańsk; Attendance: 15,008

===== League table =====
Pos	Team	Pld	W	D	L	GF	GA	GD	Pts	Qualification
1	Piast Gliwice (C)	37	21	9	7	57	33	+24	72	Qualification for the Champions League first qualifying round
2	Legia Warsaw	37	20	8	9	55	38	+17	68	Qualification for the Europa League first qualifying round
3	Lechia Gdańsk	37	19	10	8	54	38	+16	67	Qualification for the Europa League second qualifying round (Note: Lechia Gdańsk qualified for the Europa League second qualifying round by winning the 2018–19 Polish Cup.)
4	Cracovia	37	17	6	14	45	43	+2	57 (Note: Points in regular season: Cracovia 48 points, Jagiellonia Białystok 47 points.)	Qualification for the Europa League first qualifying round
5	Jagiellonia Białystok	37	16	9	12	55	52	+3	57	

Source: Ekstraklasa, 90minut
Rules for classification: 1) Points; 2) Points in regular season; 3) Head-to-head points in regular season; 4) Head-to-head goal difference in regular season; 5) Head-to-head goals scored in regular season; 5) Head-to-head away goals scored in regular season (if only two teams); 7) Goal difference; 8) Goals scored; 9) Fairplay ranking; 10) Play-off (only if needed to decide champion, teams for relegation or teams for UEFA competitions).
(C) Champions

== Polish Cup ==
25 September 2018 Round of 64	Wisła Kraków	1–1 (a.e.t.) (4-5 p)	Lechia Gdańsk	Kraków
18:00 GMT	Zdeněk Ondrášek 60' (pen.) (red card) 96'		Michał Nalepa 15'	Stadium: Stadion Miejski

7 November 2018 Round of 32	Resovia Rzeszow	1–3	Lechia Gdańsk	Rzeszów
11:00 GMT	Paweł Hass 15'		Steven Vitória 57'; Artur Sobiech 61'; Lukáš Haraslín 70'	Stadium: Stadion Stal

5 December 2018 Round of 16	Bruk-Bet Termalica Nieciecza	1–3	Lechia Gdańsk	Nieciecza
16:00 GMT	Patrik Mišák 75'		Daniel Łukasik 45'; Tomasz Makowski 67'; Rafał Wolski 90+7'	Stadium: Stadion Termaliki Bruk-Bet

27 February 2019 Quarterfinal	Górnik Zabrze	1–2	Lechia Gdańsk	Zabrze
19:30 GMT	Igor Angulo 90' (pen.)		Michał Mak 33'; Tomasz Makowski 85'	Stadium: Ernest Pohl Stadium

10 April 2019 Semifinal	Raków Częstochowa	0–1	Lechia Gdańsk	Częstochowa
17:00 GMT			Artur Sobiech 17'	Stadium: Municipal Football Stadium Raków

2 May 2019 Final	Jagiellonia Białystok	0–1	Lechia Gdańsk	Warsaw
15:00 GMT			Artur Sobiech 90+6'	Stadium: PGE Narodowy

== Statistics ==
			League		Cup		Total	
No.	Pos.	Player	Apps	Goals	Apps	Goals	Apps	Goals
1	GK	Zlatan Alomerović	9	-	4	-	13	-
3	DF	João Nunes	23	-	5	-	28	-
4	DF	Adam Chrzanowski	3	1	1	-	4	1
5	DF	Steven Vitória	15	1	5	1	20	2
6	MF	Jarosław Kubicki	35	4	6	-	41	4
8	MF	Michał Mak	19	1	3	1	22	2
9	MF	Patryk Lipski	21	6	3	-	24	6
10	MF	Egy Maulana	2	-	-	-	2	-
11	MF	Konrad Michalak	22	1	4	-	26	1
12	GK	Dušan Kuciak	28	-	2	-	30	-
16	MF	Ariel Borysiuk	5	-	-	-	5	-
17	MF	Lukáš Haraslín	33	4	5	1	38	5
18	FW	Jakub Arak	24	1	4	-	28	1
19	DF	Karol Fila	29	1	3	-	32	1
21	MF	Sławomir Peszko	1	-	-	-	1	-
22	DF	Filip Mladenović	35	3	6	-	41	3
25	DF	Michał Nalepa	35	3	6	1	41	4
26	DF	Błażej Augustyn	30	2	3	-	33	2
27	MF	Rafał Wolski	9	1	2	1	11	2
28	FW	Flávio Paixão	37	15	6	-	43	15
29	FW	Mateusz Żukowski	8	-	1	-	9	-
33	DF	Mateusz Lewandowski	2	-	1	-	3	-
35	MF	Daniel Łukasik	34	1	4	1	38	2
36	MF	Tomasz Makowski	22	-	6	2	28	2
41	DF	Paweł Stolarski	4	-	1	-	5	-
55	DF	Filip Dymerski	1	-	-	-	1	-
80	MF	Mateusz Sopoćko	5	-	1	-	6	-
90	FW	Artur Sobiech	26	7	4	3	30	10

=== Goalscorers ===
Rank	Player	Goals
1	Flávio Paixão	15
2	Artur Sobiech	10
3	Patryk Lipski	6
4	Lukáš Haraslín	5
5	Jarosław Kubicki	4
5	Michał Nalepa	4
7	Filip Mladenović	3
8	Rafał Wolski	2
8	Steven Vitória	2
8	Michał Mak	2
8	Tomasz Makowski	2
8	Błażej Augustyn	2
8	Daniel Łukasik	2
14	Adam Chrzanowski	1
14	Konrad Michalak	1
14	Jakub Arak	1
14	Karol Fila	1
14	Own Goals	1
