= Lechia Gdańsk II and Lechia's Academy =

Akademia Lechii Gdańsk SA
- Full name: Akademia Lechii Gdańsk Spółka Akcyjna
- Nicknames: Gdańskie Lwy (Gedanian Lions); Pasiaki (The stripes); Biało-Zieloni (White-Greens); Lechiści (Lechistas)
- Short name: Lechia / Lechia II / LG2
- Founded: 15 November 1953; 72 years ago (II team's first game); 18 June 2015; 11 years ago (current academy structure)
- Ground: Akademia Sportu Kolbudy, Kolbudy (Lechia II); Stadion Sportowy Rugby, Sopot (Academy games)
- League: Lechia II has not been active since 2022
- Website: http://lechia.pl/
Home colours	Away colours

The Akademia Lechia Gdańsk (Lechia Gdańsk Academy) is Lechia Gdańsk's academy section of the football club. Lechia Gdańsk II also serve as the team's official 2nd team. The Lechia Gdańsk II team is also sometimes referred to as Lechia II Gdańsk and as LG2.

== The Academy ==
Since the early years of the clubs formation they have often had an academy to some degree with the focus of developing youth players for the first team.

In 2010 Lechia Gdańsk and Grupa Lotos set up the Akademia Piłkarska Lechia Gdańsk (APLG) (English: Football Academy Lechia Gdańsk) meaning that development of youth players could be done away from the club itself, a decision which meant the club could focus more on the first team and because it was expected that it would be easier for the academy to get addition funds if it was not totally connected to the club. After five years of close cooperation there were disagreements with Lechia and APLG about the training of players, eventually leading to Lechia to reintroduce the academy into the club that year.

In 2015 it was announced that all of the youth teams would once again be returning to Lechia, with Lechia taking control of coaching and player development. It was announced that there would be 11 age groups which would make up the Academy starting from the Under-7's to the Under-23's. After 3 years, the Lechia Academy had 12 teams under their control, with other 200 staff seeing over the development. From the summer of 2019 the academy will be home to multiple levels of girls football teams with the formal incorporation of the Lechia Gdańsk Ladies into the Lechia Gdańsk structure.

2020-21 season

Team	League
Under-15's	Central Junior League U15 (group B)
Under-17's	Central Junior League U17 (group B)
Under-18's	Central Junior League U19
Under-23's (Lechia II)	IV liga (Pomerania)

=== Partnerships ===
Lechia have partnerships with academies in the Gdańsk and surrounding regions. The agreements provide Lechia with the best players, the teams to take part in competitions organised by Lechia, and better training for the coaches. Currently Lechia have partnerships with the Rotmanka Football School, APK Jedynka Kartuzy, GAP Sparta Gdańsk, and Unia Tczew.

Current partnerships

Team	Agreement start	Agreement until
Rotmanka Football School	2014	June 2021
APK Jedynka Kartuzy	September 2019	Not stated
GAP Sparta Gdańsk	January 2020	Not stated
Unia Tczew	August 2020	Not stated

== Lechia II ==
The Lechia Under-23's are also known as Lechia II, due to the team playing in the Polish leagues. As of the 2019–20 season, Lechia II are playing in the "IV liga Pomerania" league, the fifth tier of Polish football. Due to the rules of 2nd teams, only 3 players in the match day squad can be over the age of 23.

The Lechia II team was first introduced for the 1953–54 Polish Cup, with the second team's first official game being on 15 November 1953 against ŁKS Łódź. The team took part in three further Cup competitions after 1953 until the 2005–06 season when the second team became a permanent squad within the club. In 2016 it was announced that Lechia would be discontinuing the second team. Lechia reversed this decision two seasons later and introduced the reserve team again for the start of the 2018–19 season.

Shortly after reforming the second team, the club had issues relating to training pitches and where a stadium where league matches could be played. Lechia II ended up playing its matches in Kolbudy, but issues towards the end of the 2021–22 season meant that this was no longer a viable option for either the club or team. Due to being unable to find a suitable ground to play matches at, Lechia II were disbanded for the 2022–23 season.

== Seasons ==
Lechia II seasons

Season	League	Tier	Position	Matches	Points	W	D	L	GF	GA
2005–06	Klasa okręgowa - Gdańsk II	VI	1st	22	55	17	4	1	110	18
2006–07	Klasa okręgowa - Gdańsk I	VI	1st	30	65	19	8	3	74	18
2007–08	IV Liga Pomorania	V	9th	34	52	15	7	12	61	42
2008–09	IV Liga Pomorania	V	3rd	30	56	17	5	8	56	41
2009–10	IV Liga Pomorania	V	1st	30	60	17	9	4	63	19
2010–11	III Liga Grupa D	IV	9th	30	43	12	7	11	37	31
2011–12	III Liga Grupa D	IV	9th	30	38	11	5	14	35	36
2012–13	III Liga Grupa D	IV	4th	30	46	13	7	10	43	32
2013–14	III Liga Grupa D	IV	10th	30	42	12	6	12	59	51
2014–15	III Liga Grupa D	IV	2nd	30	58	16	10	4	63	33
2015–16	III Liga Grupa D	IV	9th	30	44	13	5	12	38	32
2016–18 Lechia had no second team
2018–19	IV Liga Pomorania	V	5th	36	67	20	7	9	81	44
2019–20 (Note: The 2019–20 season was cut short due to the coronavirus pandemic.)	IV Liga Pomorania	V	8th	17	26	7	5	5	38	20
2020–21	IV Liga Pomorania	V	11th	29	39	11	6	12	65	55
2021–22	IV Liga Pomorania	V	5th	29	45	14	3	12	72	56
2022–present Lechia have no second team

=== Honours ===
Honours for the Lechia II team

- III Liga
  - Runners up: 2014–15
- IV Liga
  - Winners: 2009–10
  - Third place: 2008–09
- Klasa okręgowa - Gdańsk Group I
  - Winners: 2006–07
- Klasa okręgowa - Gdańsk Group II
  - Winners: 2005–06
- Regional Polish Cup (Pomeranian Voivodeship)
  - Runners-up: 2007–08

== Academy graduates ==
Players of note who advanced through the Lechia academy who either; played for their national team, played in the Ekstraklasa, or had a long and successful career with Lechia.

1940's–1950's

- Bogdan Adamczyk
- Bogdan Araminowicz

1960's

- Stanisław Burzyński (Poland)
- Józef Gładysz
- Jerzy Jastrzębowski
- Zdzisław Puszkarz (Poland)

1970's

- Tomasz Korynt (Poland)

1980's

- Jacek Grembocki (Poland)
- Marcin Kaczmarek
- Andrzej Marchel
- Mariusz Pawlak (Poland)
- Sławomir Wojciechowski (Poland)

1990's

- Dawid Banaczek
- Tomasz Borkowski
- Tomasz Dawidowski (Poland)
- Marcin Mięciel (Poland)
- Sebastian Mila (Poland)
- Grzegorz Szamotulski (Poland)
- Marek Zieńczuk (Poland)

2000's

- Mateusz Bąk
- Marcin Pietrowski
- Bartłomiej Stolc
- Damian Szuprytowski

2010's

- Paweł Dawidowicz (Poland)
- Adam Duda
- Filip Dymerski
- Karol Fila
- Przemysław Frankowski (Poland)
- Damian Garbacik
- Łukasz Kacprzycki
- Rafał Kobryń
- Kacper Łazaj
- Juliusz Letniowski
- Tomasz Makowski
- Egy Maulana Vikri (Indonesia)
- Mateusz Sopoćko
- Kacper Urbański (Poland)
- Mateusz Żukowski

2020's

- Bartosz Brzęk
- Jakub Kałuziński (Poland)
- Filip Koperski
- Kacper Sezonienko
- Witan Sulaeman (Indonesia)

Key

Symbol	Meaning
	Won the Ekstraklasa during their career
	Played in the Ekstraklasa with Lechia
(Poland)	Nationality the player represented during their international career

== 2020-21 ==
Team	League	Position
Under-23's	IV liga Pomerania	11th

IV Liga (Pomeranian group) - 11th

Manager - Dominik Czajka (until 6 March 2021), Maciej Duraś (from 6 March 2021)

=== Lechia II stats ===
		League		Cup		Total	
Pos.	Player	Apps	Goals	Apps	Goals	Apps	Goals
GK	Filip Łobaczewski	0	0	2	0	2	0
GK	Antoni Mikułko	3	0	0	0	3	0
GK	Eryk Mirus	8	0	0	0	8	0
GK	Patryk Prange	20	0	1	0	21	0
DF	Bartosz Brylowski	7	0	0	0	7	0
DF	Wiktor Drzazga	24	0	2	0	26	0
DF	Mariusz Duraj	10	1	2	1	12	2
DF	Jakub Kapuściński	11	0	0	0	11	0
DF	Rafał Kobryń	3	1	0	0	3	1
DF	Konrad Kopiczyński	0	0	1	0	1	0
DF	Adam Łabor	6	0	1	0	7	0
DF	Igor Martuszewski	5	0	0	0	5	0
DF	Mikołaj Mekler	7	3	1	0	8	3
DF	Mykoła Musolitin	2	1	0	0	2	1
DF	Patryk Nowakowski	8	0	1	0	9	0
DF	Mateusz Paradowski	3	0	0	0	3	0
DF	Mikołaj Pietrzak	15	1	2	0	17	1
DF	Vakaris Skibiniauskas	20	1	3	0	23	1
DF	Žarko Udovičić	2	0	0	0	2	0
MF	Mateusz Borcuch	19	10	2	2	21	12
MF	Jakub Cieślicki	1	0	0	0	1	0
MF	Michał Formella	5	0	2	0	7	0
MF	Maciej Kaczorowski	26	1	3	1	29	2
MF	Błażej Kaim	2	0	0	0	2	0

		League		Cup		Total	
Pos.	Player	Apps	Goals	Apps	Goals	Apps	Goals
MF	Jakub Kałuziński	5	1	0	0	5	1
MF	Filip Koperski	1	0	1	0	2	0
MF	Egzon Kryeziu	2	0	0	0	2	0
MF	Karol Landowski	26	3	1	1	27	4
MF	Dominik Majer	19	0	1	0	9	0
MF	Egy Maulana Vikri	2	2	0	0	2	2
MF	Amadeusz Mielnik	7	2	1	0	8	3
MF	Wiktor Mosur	9	2	3	1	12	3
MF	Marek Niewiadomski	21	6	1	1	15	3
MF	Krystian Okoniewski	3	0	0	0	3	0
MF	Mikołąj Rakowski	14	1	2	1	16	2
MF	Mateusz Sadło	16	6	1	0	17	1
MF	Michał Sadowski	10	3	1	13	1	
MF	Mateusz Sopoćko	1	2	0	0	1	2
MF	Ryszard Sumiński	8	1	1	0	9	1
MF	Radosław Tuleja	14	0	1	0	15	0
MF	Kacper Urbański	5	1	0	0	5	1
MF	Mateusz Wiewiórski	6	0	2	0	8	0
MF	Cyprian Włodarczyk	1	0	1	0	2	0
MF	Maciej Zagraba	8	0	0	0	8	0
FW	Jakub Arak	1	0	0	0	1	0
FW	Ricardo Goncalves	11	3	3	0	14	3
FW	Maciej Kowalski	2	0	0	0	2	0
FW	Mateusz Żukowski	4	5	0	0	4	5

== 2019-20 ==
Team	League	Position
Under-23's	IV liga Pomerania	8th

IV Liga (Pomeranian group) - 8th

Manager - Dominik Czajka

=== Lechia II stats ===
		League		Cup		Total	
Pos.	Player	Apps	Goals	Apps	Goals	Apps	Goals
GK	Zlatan Alomerović	4	0	0	0	4	0
GK	Stefan Chmielewski	0	0	1	0	1	0
GK	Filip Łobaczewski	1	0	2	0	3	0
GK	Eryk Mirus	0	0	1	0	1	0
GK	Patryk Prange	1	0	0	0	1	0
GK	Maciej Woźniak	12	0	0	0	12	0
DF	Adam Chrzanowski	8	1	0	0	8	1
DF	Filip Dymerski	9	0	0	0	9	0
DF	Jakub Kapuściński	3	0	1	0	4	0
DF	Rafał Kobryń	9	1	0	0	9	1
DF	Jan Kopania	10	0	2	0	2	0
DF	Mario Maloča	1	0	0	0	1	0
DF	Mikołaj Pietrzak	1	0	0	0	1	0
DF	Žarko Udovičić	2	0	0	0	2	0
DF	Maksymilian Woltman	1	0	0	0	1	0
DF	Paweł Żuk	16	1	0	0	16	1
MF	Mateusz Borcuch	6	0	3	1	9	1
MF	Mateusz Cegiełka	14	0	3	0	17	0
MF	Jakub Cieślicki	3	0	1	0	4	0
MF	Miłosz Dziurzyński	2	0	1	0	3	0
MF	Maciej Gajos	2	3	0	0	2	3
MF	Piotr Gryszkiewicz	16	3	3	4	19	7
MF	Maciej Kaczorowski	7	0	2	0	9	0
MF	Jakub Kałuziński	1	0	0	0	1	0

		League		Cup		Total	
Pos.	Player	Apps	Goals	Apps	Goals	Apps	Goals
MF	Samuel Lewandowski	2	0	2	0	4	0
MF	Patryk Lipski	4	2	0	0	4	2
MF	Kuba Lizakowski	6	1	0	0	6	1
MF	Daniel Łukasik	1	0	0	0	1	0
MF	Egy Maulana Vikri	5	2	0	0	5	2
MF	Jaroslav Mihalík	2	3	0	0	2	3
MF	Daniel Mikołajewski	11	1	3	0	14	1
MF	Marek Niewiadomski	1	0	0	0	1	0
MF	Adrian Petk	13	2	3	2	16	4
MF	Dmytro Posyliuzhnyi	1	0	0	0	1	0
MF	Mikołąj Rakowski	3	0	2	0	5	0
MF	Sebastian Rugowski	13	6	3	3	16	9
MF	Kamil Rusinek	2	0	0	0	2	0
MF	Dominik Rycewicz	3	0	0	0	3	0
MF	Kacper Sezonienko	1	0	0	0	1	0
MF	Mateusz Sopoćko	1	0	0	0	1	0
MF	Kacper Urbański	1	0	1	1	2	1
MF	Rafał Wolski	1	2	0	0	1	2
MF	Marcel Wszołek	15	1	3	0	18	1
FW	Jakub Arak	4	6	0	0	4	6
FW	Flávio Paixão	2	1	0	0	2	1
FW	Filip Szymański	6	0	3	0	9	0
FW	Mateusz Żukowski	2	2	0	0	2	2

== 2018-19 ==
Team	League	Position
Under-15's	Central Junior League U15; Group B	Autumn league - 5th Spring league -5th
Under-17's	Central Junior League U17; Group B	Autumn league - 3rd Spring league -2nd
Under-19's	Central Junior League U-19; Liga Makroregionalna Group B	1st
Under-23's	IV liga Pomerania	5th

IV Liga (Pomeranian group) - 5th

Manager - Dominik Czajka

=== Lechia II stats ===
		League		Cup		Total	
Pos.	Player	Apps	Goals	Apps	Goals	Apps	Goals
GK	Zlatan Alomerović	2	-	-	-	2	-
GK	Kacper Chomicz	-	-	1	-	1	-
GK	Dušan Kuciak	1	-	-	-	1	-
GK	Kuba Michałowski	3	-	3	-	6	-
GK	Maciej Woźniak	22	-	-	-	22	-
DF	Błażej Augustyn	1	-	-	-	1	-
DF	Adam Chrzanowski	8	-	-	-	8	-
DF	Wiktor Drzazga	-	-	1	-	1	-
DF	Filip Dymerski	16	-	3	-	19	-
DF	João Nunes	1	-	-	-	1	-
DF	Mateusz Kaczyński	1	-	-	-	1	-
DF	Jakub Kapuściński	7	-	1	-	8	-
DF	Jan Kopania	9	1	2	1	11	2
DF	Paweł Lekowski	2	-	2	-	4	-
DF	Mateusz Lewandowski	11	2	-	-	11	2
DF	Maciej Marek	8	-	-	-	8	-
DF	Steven Vitória	1	-	-	-	1	-
DF	Marcin Wiśniewski	2	-	3	-	5	-
DF	Grzegorz Wojtkowiak	17	-	2	1	19	1
MF	Ariel Borysiuk	5	4	-	-	5	4
MF	Mateusz Cegiełka	24	1	1	-	25	1
MF	Jakub Cieślicki	3	-	2	-	5	-
MF	Jakub Dąbrowski	-	-	3	1	3	1
MF	Karol Fila	3	-	-	-	3	-
MF	Aleksander Gabryel	-	-	1	1	1	1
MF	Piotr Gryszkiewicz	15	2	2	2	17	4
MF	Adam Juszczyński	3	-	3	1	6	1
MF	Miloš Krasić	5	-	3	3	8	3

		League		Cup		Total	
Pos.	Player	Apps	Goals	Apps	Goals	Apps	Goals
MF	Adam Kucznier	6	-	-	-	6	-
MF	Bartosz Kuźniarski	16	-	2	-	18	-
MF	Karol Landowski	20	2	4	-	22	2
MF	Kuba Lizakowski	18	1	3	1	21	2
MF	Tomasz Makowski	6	1	-	-	6	1
MF	Dominik Majer	-	-	1	-	1	-
MF	Egy Maulana Vikri	16	13	-	-	16	13
MF	Konrad Michalak	1	-	-	-	1	-
MF	Daniel Mikołajewski	14	3	-	-	14	3
MF	Marek Niewiadomski	-	-	1	-	1	-
MF	Sławomir Peszko	4	1	-	-	4	1
MF	Adrian Petk	21	1	2	-	23	1
MF	Dmytro Posyliuzhnyi	4	-	1	-	5	-
MF	Sebastian Rugowski	24	5	1	2	25	7
MF	Dominik Rycewicz	6	-	4	-	10	-
MF	Florian Schikowski	3	2	-	-	3	2
MF	Mateusz Sopoćko	16	6	-	-	16	6
MF	Rafał Włodarczyk	3	-	1	-	4	-
MF	Rafał Wolski	1	-	-	-	1	-
MF	Marcel Wszołek	9	1	1	2	10	3
FW	Jakub Arak	2	-	-	-	2	-
FW	Przemysław Macierzyński	10	2	2	3	12	5
FW	Michał Mak	3	-	-	-	3	-
FW	Kacper Sezonienko	-	-	1	-	1	-
FW	Kamil Sikora	4	1	-	-	4	1
FW	Artur Sobiech	1	-	-	-	1	-
FW	Dominik Szukiełowicz	16	-	1	-	17	-
FW	Mateusz Żukowski	13	10	-	-	13	10

- Those players marked in grey were over the age of 23 for the 2018–19 season but made at least one appearance for the second team.

== 2015-16 ==
III Liga (Group D) - 9th place

Manager - Adam Fedoruk

=== Lechia II stats ===
		League		Cup		Total	
Pos.	Player	Apps	Goals	Apps	Goals	Apps	Goals
GK	Mateusz Bąk	17	-	1	-	18	-
GK	Łukasz Budziłek	10	-	-	-	10	-
GK	Damian Podleśny	1	-	-	-	1	-
GK	Kajetan Zalewski	2	-	1	-	3	-
DF	Adam Chrzanowski	12	-	1	-	13	-
DF	Bartłomiej Danowski	16	-	1	-	17	-
DF	Adam Dźwigała	7	2	-	-	7	2
DF	Gerson	3	-	-	-	3	-
DF	Cezary Głon	10	-	1	-	11	-
DF	Mateusz Goerke	27	1	2	-	29	2
DF	Mateusz Gołębiewski	6	-	-	-	6	-
DF	Daniel Górski	27	1	2	-	29	-
DF	Miłosz Kałahur	10	-	1	-	11	-
DF	Nikola Leković	3	-	-	-	3	-
DF	Neven Marković	7	1	-	-	7	1
DF	Bernard Powszuk	8	-	-	-	8	-
DF	Rudinilson Silva	21	-	1	-	22	-
DF	Paweł Stolarski	2	-	-	-	2	-
DF	Mateusz Toporek	11	-	-	-	11	-
DF	Tiago Valente	15	2	-	-	15	2
MF	Michał Chrapek	4	-	1	-	5	-
MF	Karol Fila	8	-	-	-	8	-

		League		Cup		Total	
Pos.	Player	Apps	Goals	Apps	Goals	Apps	Goals
MF	Martin Kobylański	3	2	-	-	3	2
MF	Jakub Kostyrka	10	-	-	-	10	-
MF	Juliusz Letniowski	23	5	2	2	25	7
MF	Daniel Łukasik	2	-	-	-	2	-
MF	Tomasz Makowski	6	-	-	-	6	-
MF	Igor Michalski	2	-	-	-	2	-
MF	Bruno Nazário	6	1	-	-	6	1
MF	Oskar Paprzycki	18	2	2	-	20	2
MF	Bartłomiej Pawłowski	1	-	-	-	1	-
MF	Artur Stawikowski	1	-	-	-	1	-
MF	Maciej Wolski	15	1	2	-	17	1
MF	Daniel Woźniak	6	-	2	-	8	-
FW	Adam Buksa	2	-	-	-	2	-
FW	Adam Gołuński	29	2	2	1	31	3
FW	Lukáš Haraslín	1	2	-	-	1	2
FW	Dawid Karczewski	12	-	1	-	13	-
FW	Przemysław Macierzyński	17	4	-	-	17	4
FW	Michał Mak	2	3	-	-	2	3
FW	Albin Teresiński	3	-	1	-	4	-
FW	Piotr Wiśniewski	5	3	-	-	5	3
FW	Michał Żebrakowski	15	4	1	1	16	5

- Those players marked in grey were over the age of 23 for the 2018–19 season but made at least one appearance for the second team.

== 2014-15 ==
III Liga (Group D) - 2nd place

Manager - Maciej Kalkowski (until 15 November 2014), Tomasz Unton (from 16 November 2014)

=== Lechia II stats ===
		League	
Pos.	Player	Apps	Goals
GK	Bartosz Kaniecki	1	0
GK	Patryk Sobczak	14	0
GK	Łukasz Budziłek	4	0
GK	Damian Podleśny	8	0
GK	Maciej Raniowski	1	0
GK	Kacper Rosa	3	0
DF	Karol Adamiuk	2	0
DF	Damian Garbacik	16	0
DF	Piotr Jaroszek	12	1
DF	Andrzej Kaszuba	23	3
DF	Nikola Leković	6	1
DF	Bernard Powszuk	24	1
DF	Kewin Sidor	3	0
DF	Maciej Staniaszek	1	0
DF	Mavroudis Bougaidis	6	1
DF	Bartłomiej Danowski	1	0
DF	Adam Dźwigała	7	1
DF	Mateusz Goerke	1	0
DF	Mateusz Gołębiewski	3	0
DF	Daniel Górski	3	0
DF	Diego Hoffmann	10	1
DF	Jacek Jadanowski	9	0
DF	Rafał Janicki	1	0

		League	
Pos.	Player	Apps	Goals
DF	Przemysław Kamiński	4	0
DF	Mateusz Możdżeń	6	2
DF	Rudinilson Silva	17	0
DF	Mateusz Toporek	1	0
DF	Tiago Valente	1	1
MF	Kacper Dubanowski	1	0
MF	Jakub Kołodziejczyk	1	0
MF	Tomasz Kopecki	1	0
MF	Juliusz Letniowski	3	0
MF	Tsubasa Nishi	15	3
MF	Sebastian Sypniewski	1	0
MF	Filip Bobowski	10	0
MF	Ariel Borysiuk	1	0
MF	Bruno Nazário	1	0
MF	Maciej Gregorek	3	0
MF	Adlan Katsayev	4	0
MF	Donatas Kazlauskas	6	2
MF	Daniel Łukasik	4	1
MF	Filip Malbašić	6	0
MF	Igor Michalski	7	1
MF	Oskar Paprzycki	2	0
MF	Bartłomiej Pawłowski	4	3
MF	Marcin Pietrowski	7	2

		League	
Pos.	Player	Apps	Goals
MF	Tomasz Preizner	14	1
MF	Maciej Wolski	21	1
MF	Daniel Woźniak	1	0
MF	Oskar Zmysłowski	1	0
FW	Łukasz Kopka	16	2
FW	Kacper Łazaj	1	0
FW	Zaur Sadayev	1	0
FW	Piotr Wiśniewski	3	2
FW	Danijel Aleksić	6	3
FW	Adam Buksa	8	3
FW	Antonio Čolak	1	0
FW	Paweł Czychowski	28	20
FW	Kevin Friesenbichler	2	2
FW	Hieronim Gierszewski	10	1
FW	Adam Gołuński	15	3
FW	Piotr Grzelczak	3	0
FW	Dawid Karczewski	4	0
FW	Marcin Karniluk	1	0
FW	Przemysław Macierzyński	1	0
FW	Albin Teresiński	1	0
FW	Karol Wiśniewski	9	0
FW	Karol Zieliński	8	0

- Those players marked in grey were over the age of 23 for the 2018–19 season but made at least one appearance for the second team.

== 1976–77 ==
During the 1976–77 season the Lechia II team took part in both the Polish Cup and the Regional Polish Cup. The player stats shown for this season are for the Polish Cup.

=== 1976–77 Lechia II stats ===
		Cup	
Pos.	Player	Apps	Goals
GK	Leszek Kwaśniewicz	2	0
DF	Jerzy Górski	2	0
DF	Bogusław Kaczmarek	2	0
DF	Edward Kołodziej	2	0
DF	Janusz Makowski	1	0
DF	Marek Sęk	2	0
MF	Józef Gładysz	2	0

		Cup	
Pos.	Player	Apps	Goals
MF	Zbigniew Krawczyk	2	1
MF	Zdzisław Puszkarz	2	0
FW	Andrzej Głownia	1	0
FW	Henryk Kliszewicz	2	0
FW	Tomasz Korynt	1	0
FW	Krzysztof Matuszewski	2	0
FW	Leonard Radowski	2	0

There were two players who played for Lechia II in the Regional Polish Cup, only their last names are known. These players are; Mucha and Szaniawski.

== 1973–74 ==
The second season there was a Lechia II team was during the 1973–74 Polish Cup. The team only played in the cup that season, but there are no player statistics known for this team that season.

== 1953–54 ==
This was the first season a second team played for Lechia Gdańsk. The only competition the second team played in for this season was the 1953–54 Polish Cup.

=== 1953–54 Lechia II stats ===
		Cup	
Pos.	Player	Apps	Goals
GK	Henryk Gronowski	1	0
GK	Marcin Potrykus	1	0
DF	Jerzy Kaleta	1	0
DF	Hubert Kusz	2	0
DF	Czesław Lenc	1	0
DF	Waldemar Łukasik	1	0
MF	Alfred Kamzela	2	0
MF	Czesław Nowicki	2	0
FW	Bogdan Adamczyk	1	0

		Cup	
Pos.	Player	Apps	Goals
FW	Jerzy Czubała	2	0
FW	Adam Dudziński	2	1
FW	Leszek Goździk	1	0
FW	Robert Gronowski	1	0
FW	Alfred Kokot	1	1
FW	Aleksander Kupcewicz	2	0
FW	Władysław Musiał	1	1
FW	Roman Rogocz	1	0
FW	Ryszard Walkiewicz	1	0
