= Landowski =

Landowski or Landowsky (feminine Landowska, plural Landowscy) is a Polish surname.

Notable people with the surname include:

- Françoise Landowski-Caillet (1917–2007), French pianist and painter, son of Paul
- Jan Landowski, Polish Warsaw Zoo director
- John Landowski, American track and field athlete and football player
- Karol Landowski (born 2000), Polish footballer
- Marcel Landowski (1915–1999), French composer, son of Paul
- Manon Landowski (born 1964), French singer-songwriter, daughter of Marcel, granddaughter of Paul
- Nadine Landowski (1908–1943), French painter, son of Paul
- Paul Landowski (1875–1961), Polish-French monument sculptor, Christ the Redeemer (statue) creator
- Ralph Landowski (1912–1968), American politician and plumber
- Trina Landowski, Wisconsin Miss Teen USA 1992
- Klaus-Rüdiger Landowsky, German politician and manager, former member of city parliament in Berlin (West)
- Wanda Landowska (1879–1959), Polish harpsichordist

== Fictional ==
- Private Landowska, character from Screamers (1995 film)
- Stanley Landowski, one of a draft names of character Stanley Kowalski from A Streetcar Named Desire
