= Wszołek =

Wszołek is a Polish surname. Notable people with the surname include:

- Marcel Wszołek (born 2002), Polish footballer
- Paweł Wszołek (born 1992), Polish footballer
