= Gryszkiewicz =

Gryszkiewicz is a surname. Notable people with this surname include:

- Adrian Gryszkiewicz (born 1999), Polish footballer
- Piotr Gryszkiewicz (born 2001), Polish footballer
