= Mateusz Żukowski =

Polish footballer

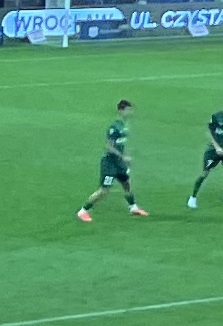
- Żukowski with Śląsk Wrocław in 2024

Personal information
- Date of birth: 23 November 2001 (age 24)
- Place of birth: Lębork, Poland
- Height: 1.85 m (6 ft 1 in)
- Positions: Right-back; forward

Team information
- Current team: 1. FC Magdeburg
- Number: 22

Youth career
- Pogoń Lębork
- 2015–2017: Lechia Gdańsk

Senior career*
| Years | Team | Apps | (Gls) |
| 2017–2022 | Lechia Gdańsk | 44 | (2) |
| 2018–2020 | Lechia Gdańsk II | 19 | (15) |
| 2019–2020 | → Chojniczanka (loan) | 11 | (0) |
| 2022–2023 | Rangers | 0 | (0) |
| 2022–2023 | → Lech Poznań (loan) | 3 | (0) |
| 2022–2023 | → Lech Poznań II (loan) | 13 | (1) |
| 2023–2025 | Śląsk Wrocław | 59 | (3) |
| 2024 | Śląsk Wrocław II | 3 | (4) |
| 2025– | 1. FC Magdeburg | 31 | (23) |

International career^{‡}
| 2017–2018 | Poland U17 | 9 | (1) |
| 2019 | Poland U19 | 6 | (0) |
| 2019–2022 | Poland U20 | 5 | (0) |
| 2021 | Poland U21 | 4 | (0) |
| 2026– | Poland | 6 | (0) |
- * Club domestic league appearances and goals as of 13:45, 10 November 2026 (UTC) ‡ National team caps and goals as of 23:40, 17 November 2026 (UTC)

Mateusz Żukowski (born 23 November 2001) is a Polish professional footballer who plays as a forward for 2. Bundesliga club 1. FC Magdeburg and the Poland national team.

He has previously played for Lechia Gdańsk, Rangers, Śląsk Wrocław and had loan spells at Chojniczanka and Lech Poznań.

== Club career ==
On 31 January 2022, Żukowski signed for Scottish club Rangers, on a four-year deal and for an undisclosed fee, reported to be £400,000. On 12 February 2022, he made his debut in a Scottish Cup match away to Annan Athletic.

On 30 August 2022, he joined Polish defending champions Lech Poznań on loan until the end of the season, with an option to buy.

On 28 June 2023, Żukowski joined Śląsk Wrocław for an undisclosed fee. On 29 May 2024, his contract was extended for a further two years.

On 2 September 2025, Żukowski signed for 2. Bundesliga club 1. FC Magdeburg. Playing as a right-back or wide midfielder throughout most of his career, he was moved to a centre-forward position at Magdeburg.

== International career ==
In May 2026, Żukowski received his first call-up to the Poland national team for a set of friendlies against Ukraine and Nigeria. His debut for Poland came on 31 May, when he entered the pitch as a substitute in a 2–0 loss to Ukraine.

== Career statistics ==
=== Club ===
As of match played 8 November 2026

Appearances and goals by club, season and competition
| Club | Season | League | | | National cup (Note: Includes Polish Cup, Scottish Cup, DFB-Pokal) | | Europe | | Other | | Total | |
| Club | Season | Division | Apps | Goals | Apps | Goals | Apps | Goals | Apps | Goals | Apps | Goals |
|---|---|---|---|---|---|---|---|---|---|---|---|---|
| Lechia Gdańsk | 2017–18 | Ekstraklasa | 2 | 0 | 0 | 0 | — | | — | | 2 | 0 |
| Lechia Gdańsk | 2018–19 | Ekstraklasa | 8 | 0 | 1 | 0 | — | | — | | 9 | 0 |
| Lechia Gdańsk | 2020–21 | Ekstraklasa | 16 | 0 | 3 | 0 | — | | — | | 19 | 0 |
| Lechia Gdańsk | 2021–22 | Ekstraklasa | 18 | 2 | 2 | 0 | — | | — | | 20 | 2 |
| Lechia Gdańsk | Total | | 44 | 2 | 6 | 0 | — | | — | | 50 | 2 |
| Lechia Gdańsk II | 2018–19 | IV liga Pomerania | 13 | 10 | — | | — | | — | | 13 | 10 |
| Lechia Gdańsk II | 2019–20 | IV liga Pomerania | 2 | 0 | — | | — | | — | | 2 | 0 |
| Lechia Gdańsk II | 2020–21 | IV liga Pomerania | 4 | 5 | — | | — | | — | | 4 | 5 |
| Lechia Gdańsk II | Total | | 19 | 15 | — | | — | | — | | 19 | 15 |
| Chojniczanka (loan) | 2019–20 | I liga | 11 | 0 | 1 | 0 | — | | — | | 12 | 0 |
| Rangers | 2021–22 | Scottish Premiership | 0 | 0 | 1 | 0 | 0 | 0 | — | | 1 | 0 |
| Lech Poznań (loan) | 2022–23 | Ekstraklasa | 3 | 0 | 0 | 0 | 0 | 0 | — | | 3 | 0 |
| Lech Poznań II (loan) | 2022–23 | II liga | 13 | 1 | 0 | 0 | — | | — | | 13 | 1 |
| Śląsk Wrocław | 2023–24 | Ekstraklasa | 27 | 1 | 1 | 0 | — | | — | | 28 | 1 |
| Śląsk Wrocław | 2024–25 | Ekstraklasa | 31 | 2 | 2 | 0 | 4 (Note: Appearances in UEFA Conference League) | 0 | — | | 37 | 2 |
| Śląsk Wrocław | 2025–26 | I liga | 1 | 0 | — | | — | | — | | 1 | 0 |
| Śląsk Wrocław | Total | | 59 | 3 | 3 | 0 | 4 | 0 | — | | 66 | 3 |
| Śląsk Wrocław II | 2023–24 | III liga, group III | 3 | 4 | — | | — | | — | | 3 | 4 |
| 1. FC Magdeburg | 2025–26 | 2. Bundesliga | 21 | 17 | 1 | 0 | — | | — | | 22 | 17 |
| 1. FC Magdeburg | 2026–27 | 2. Bundesliga | 10 | 6 | 2 | 3 | — | | — | | 12 | 9 |
| 1. FC Magdeburg | Total | | 31 | 23 | 3 | 3 | — | | — | | 34 | 26 |
| Career total | | | 183 | 48 | 14 | 3 | 4 | 0 | 0 | 0 | 201 | 51 |

=== International ===
As of match played 17 November 2026

Appearances and goals by national team and year
| National team | Year | Apps | Goals |
|---|---|---|---|
| Poland | 2026 | 6 | 0 |
| Total | | 6 | 0 |

== Honours ==
Lechia Gdańsk

- Polish Cup: 2018–19

Rangers

- Scottish Cup: 2021–22
