= Przemysław Kamiński =

Polish footballer

Personal information
- Full name: Przemysław Kamiński
- Date of birth: 8 April 1996 (age 30)
- Place of birth: Gdańsk, Poland
- Height: 1.88 m (6 ft 2 in)
- Position: Defender

Youth career
- –2008: Olivia Gdańsk
- 2008–2011: Lechia Gdańsk
- 2011–2012: APLG Gdańsk
- 2012–2013: Lechia Gdańsk

Senior career*
| Years | Team | Apps | (Gls) |
| 2013–2015 | Lechia Gdańsk | 0 | (0) |
| 2013–2015 | Lechia Gdańsk II | 11 | (0) |
| 2016 | Concordia Elbląg | 16 | (1) |
| 2017–2018 | Gryf Wejherowo | 34 | (0) |
| 2018 | Concordia Elbląg | 10 | (1) |
| 2019 | Wierzyca Pelplin | 8 | (0) |
| 2021–2022 | Pama Powodowo | 20 | (19) |
| Total | | 99 | (21) |

International career
| 2014 | Poland U18 | 1 | (1) |
- * Club domestic league appearances and goals

Przemysław Kamiński (born 8 April 1996) is a Polish former professional footballer who played as a defender.

== Senior career ==
Kamiński began his career with Lechia Gdańsk, with whom he failed to make an appearance for the first team, but played for the Lechia second team for the 2013–14 season. In 2014 he joined Concordia Elbląg, where he spent the next 3 years of his career. In January 2017, Kamiński joined Gryf Wejherowo. In total he played 34 times in the league for Gryf, before once again returning to Concordia Elbląg in 2018.
