= Jakub Arak =

Polish professional footballer (born 1995)

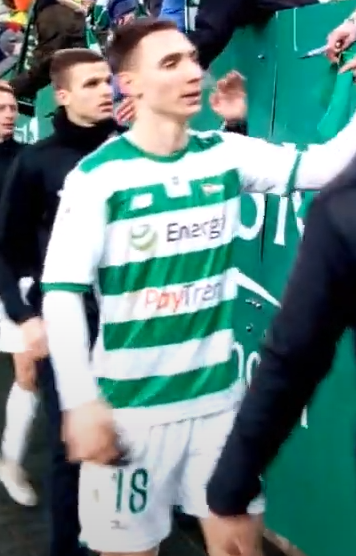
- Arak with Lechia Gdańsk in 2018

Personal information
- Full name: Jakub Arak
- Date of birth: 2 April 1995 (age 31)
- Place of birth: Warsaw, Poland
- Height: 1.83 m (6 ft 0 in)
- Position: Striker

Team information
- Current team: Polonia Bytom
- Number: 23

Youth career
- 2003–2006: Victoria Głosków
- 2006–2013: Legia Warsaw

Senior career*
Years	Team	Apps	(Gls)
2013–2014	Legia Warsaw II	24	(7)
2014–2016	→ Zagłębie Sosnowiec (loan)	65	(25)
2016–2017	Ruch Chorzów	36	(4)
2017–2021	Lechia Gdańsk	31	(1)
2018–2021	Lechia Gdańsk II	6	(6)
2018–2019	→ Stal Mielec (loan)	15	(7)
2021–2022	Raków Częstochowa	30	(1)
2022–2025	GKS Katowice	65	(11)
2025–	Polonia Bytom	37	(13)

International career
2014	Poland U19	3	(1)
2015–2016	Poland U20	5	(0)
- * Club domestic league appearances and goals as of 08:47, 27 May 2026 (UTC)

Jakub Arak (born 2 April 1995) is a Polish professional footballer who plays as a striker for I liga club Polonia Bytom.

== Honours ==
Lechia Gdańsk

- Polish Cup: 2018–19

Raków Częstochowa

- Polish Cup: 2020–21, 2021–22
- Polish Super Cup: 2021

Raków Częstochowa II

- IV liga Silesia I: 2021–22

Polonia Bytom

- II liga: 2024–25

Individual

- I liga Player of the Month: November & December 2025
