= Diego Hoffmann =

Brazilian football player (born 1993)

Personal information
- Full name: Diego Araújo Hoffmann
- Date of birth: 4 February 1993 (age 33)
- Place of birth: Santa Terezinha de Itaipu, Brazil
- Height: 1.82 m (6 ft 0 in)
- Position: Left-back

Team information
- Current team: Nova Mutum (on loan from Brasil de Farroupilha)

Youth career
- –2012: SER Caxias

Senior career*
Years	Team	Apps	(Gls)
2012–2013	SER Caxias	0	(0)
2013–2015	Criciúma	2	(0)
2014–2015	→ Lechia Gdańsk (loan)	0	(0)
2014–2015	→ Lechia Gdańsk II (loan)	10	(1)
2015	Juventude	0	(0)
2015–2016	Lajeadense	1	(0)
2018	Frederiquense	4	(0)
2021–	Brasil de Farroupilha	43	(1)
2024–	→ Nova Mutum (loan)	4	(0)
- * Club domestic league appearances and goals as of 4 February 2024

Diego Araújo Hoffmann (born 4 February 1993) is a Brazilian professional footballer who plays as a left-back for Nova Mutum, on loan from Brasil de Farroupilha.

He spent the majority of his career in Brazil, having a brief loan spell with Lechia Gdańsk in Poland. Hoffmann made two appearances in Brazil's Série A, spending the later years of his playing career in the lower divisions of Brazilian football.
