= Łukasz Kopka =

Polish association football player (born 1996)

Personal information
- Full name: Łukasz Kopka
- Date of birth: 3 January 1996 (age 30)
- Place of birth: Sztum, Poland
- Height: 1.77 m (5 ft 10 in)
- Position: Midfielder

Team information
- Current team: Grom Nowy Staw
- Number: 10

Youth career
- –2013: Lechia Gdańsk II

Senior career*
Years	Team	Apps	(Gls)
2013–2016	Lechia Gdańsk II	26	(2)
2015–2016	→ Legionovia Legionowo (loan)	24	(1)
2016–2017	ŁKS Łódź	32	(2)
2017–2018	GKS Przodkowo	12	(0)
2018	Värmbols FC	14	(0)
2019	Assyriska FF	2	(0)
2020–2023	Concordia Elbląg	98	(22)
2024–	Grom Nowy Staw	77	(5)
- * Club domestic league appearances and goals as of 20:10, 25 June 2025 (UTC)

Łukasz Kopka (born 3 January 1996) is a Polish professional footballer who plays as a midfielder for III liga club Grom Nowy Staw.

== Senior career ==
Kopka began his career with Lechia Gdańsk. Having progressed through the youth teams Kopka joined the Lechia's second team, playing a total of 12 games for the team. In 2015, he moved on a season-long loan to Legionovia Legionowo where he scored his first professional goal. After his loan, he made a permanent move to ŁKS Łódź, with whom he played for the 2016–17 season. After the season, Kopka moved once again, this time joining GKS Przodkowo. In March 2018, he was released from his contract with Przodkowo and moved to play in the Swedish lower leagues, firstly with Värmbols FC in 2018 before joining Assyriska FF in 2019.

In 2020, Kopka returned to Poland joining Concordia Elbląg. During a 4-season stint with the club, Kopka made a minimum of 73 league appearances scoring 15 goals. During the winter break in 2024, Kopka joined Grom Nowy Staw.

== Honours ==
Concordia Elbląg

- IV liga Warmia-Masuria: 2021–22
- Polish Cup (Warmia-Masuria regionals): 2020–21, 2022–23

Grom Nowy Staw

- Polish Cup (Pomerania regionals): 2023–24
