= Adam Chrzanowski =

Polish professional footballer (born 1999)

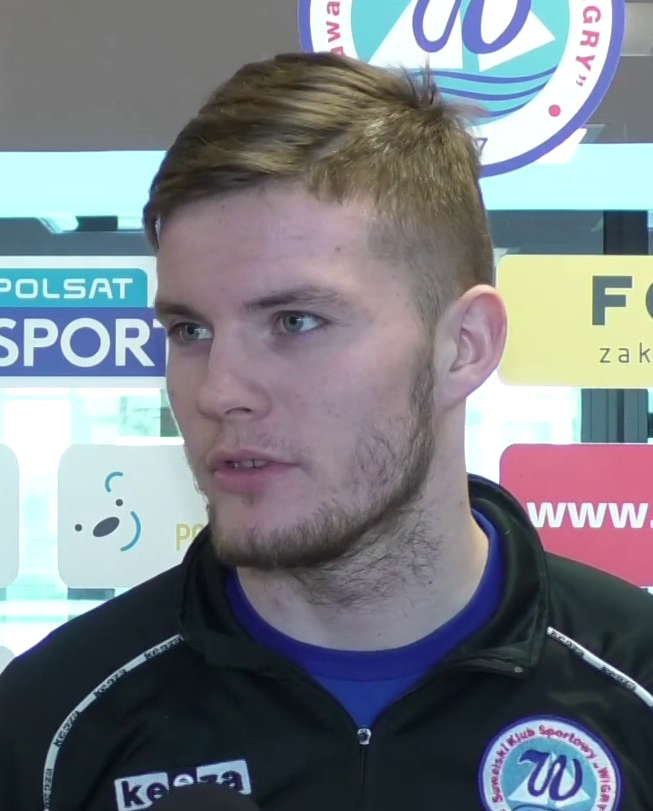
- Chrzanowski with Wigry Suwałki in 2019

Personal information
- Date of birth: 31 March 1999 (age 27)
- Place of birth: Warsaw, Poland
- Height: 1.86 m (6 ft 1 in)
- Position: Defender

Team information
- Current team: Stal Stalowa Wola
- Number: 44

Youth career
- –2014: KS Raszyn
- 2014–2015: Znicz Pruszków
- 2016–2017: → Fiorentina Primavera (loan)

Senior career*
Years	Team	Apps	(Gls)
2015	Znicz Pruszków	5	(0)
2015–2019	Lechia Gdańsk II	28	(1)
2016–2020	Lechia Gdańsk	16	(2)
2019	→ Wigry Suwałki (loan)	12	(0)
2020	→ Miedź Legnica (loan)	5	(0)
2020–2022	Pordenone	17	(0)
2022	→ Wisła Płock (loan)	9	(0)
2022–2024	Wisła Płock	35	(1)
2023–2025	Wisła Płock II	21	(1)
2025–2026	Odra Opole	32	(0)
2026–	Stal Stalowa Wola	0	(0)

International career
2015	Poland U16	5	(0)
2014–2016	Poland U17	19	(0)
2016	Poland U18	5	(0)
2016–2018	Poland U19	11	(0)
2018–2019	Poland U20	7	(0)
- * Club domestic league appearances and goals as of 08:26, 27 May 2026 (UTC)

Adam Chrzanowski (born 31 March 1999) is a Polish professional footballer who plays as a defender for II liga club Stal Stalowa Wola.

== Club career ==
On 13 March 2020, Chrzanowski signed a contract with Italian Serie B club Pordenone, which became active in July 2020.

On 17 January 2022, he returned to Poland and moved to Wisła Płock on loan until the end of the season. On 30 June, he joined the club on a permanent basis, signing a three-year contract.

On 17 January 2025, Chrzanowski joined I liga club Odra Opole on a deal until June 2026, with an option for a further year.

On 17 July 2026, Chrzanowski moved to a lower division, joining II liga club Stal Stalowa Wola.

== Honours ==
Lechia Gdańsk

- Polish Cup: 2018–19

Wisła Płock II

- IV liga Masovia: 2023–24
