= Błażej Augustyn =

Polish footballer (born 1988)

Personal information
- Full name: Błażej Szczepan Augustyn
- Date of birth: 26 January 1988 (age 38)
- Place of birth: Strzelin, Poland
- Height: 1.91 m (6 ft 3 in)
- Position: Centre-back

Youth career
- Strzelinianka Strzelin
- 2003–2004: Śląsk Wrocław
- 2004–2005: UKS SMS Łódź
- 2005–2006: Bolton Wanderers

Senior career*
Years	Team	Apps	(Gls)
2006–2007	Bolton Wanderers	0	(0)
2007–2009	Legia Warsaw	4	(0)
2008–2009	→ Rimini (loan)	6	(0)
2009–2013	Catania	17	(0)
2011–2012	→ Vicenza (loan)	26	(1)
2013–2015	Górnik Zabrze	22	(2)
2015–2016	Heart of Midlothian	22	(0)
2016–2017	Ascoli	30	(0)
2017–2020	Lechia Gdańsk	57	(5)
2018	Lechia Gdańsk II	1	(0)
2020–2022	Jagiellonia Białystok	37	(1)
2022	Jagiellonia Białystok II	6	(2)
2022–2023	Wieczysta Kraków	8	(0)
2023–2024	WKS Wierzbice	17	(10)
2024	Zenit Międzybórz	0	(0)

International career
2009–2010	Poland U21	3	(0)
- * Club domestic league appearances and goals as of 27 October 2024

Błażej Szczepan Augustyn (Polish pronunciation: [ˈbwaʐɛj au̯ˈɡustɨn]; born 26 January 1988) is a Polish professional footballer who plays as a centre-back.

== Club career ==
=== Youth career ===
Augustyn began his youth career with SK Strzelinianka Strzelin in the late 1990s and remained with the amateur club until he transferred to Śląsk Wrocław in 2003. He remained with the youth system for just one season before transferring to UKS SMS Łódź in 2004. Following an impressive spell with the club's youth team, Augustyn made a transfer to the Premier League with Bolton Wanderers.

=== Bolton Wanderers ===
Augustyn officially signed for Bolton Wanderers midway through the 2005–06 season, and signed his first professional contract on 3 August 2006. Augustyn then made his only appearance for the first team on 6 January 2007 as a substitute in an FA Cup 3rd round tie against Doncaster Rovers. He was offered a contract extension by former Bolton manager Sammy Lee, but turned it down as his first team opportunities would be limited.

=== Legia Warsaw ===
In June 2007, Augustyn returned to Poland, signing a four-year contract with Legia Warsaw.

On 29 July 2007, he made his Legia Warsaw debut, making his first start before coming off in the 88th minute just two minutes from the end of the game, in a 1–0 win against the KS Cracovia. However, in his third appearance against Korona Kielce on 21 September 2007, Augustyn made a mistake in the 2nd minute of the game, allowing Grzegorz Bonin to score the only goal in the game. After the game, Augustyn apologised and took the blame for his mistake. Between 2007 and 2008, the 19-year-old Augustyn made just 4 first team appearances, but spent time within the youth team as well. Augustyn later spoke about his time at Legia Warsaw, saying the club accused him of "hypertrophy ambitions".

=== Rimini Calcio ===
In August 2008, he joined Rimini on loan in the Italian Serie B.

He suffered a knee injury during his second appearance for the club which saw him miss most of the season, but he made four appearances in regular league matches and two in the playouts. Following Rimini's relegation, Augustyn returned to Legia Warsaw, but was instantly sold back to Italy, joining Serie A side, Catania in June 2009.

=== Calcio Catania ===
On 22 June 2009, Augustyn signed a four-year contract with Serie A side Catania.

During pre-season, he won the inaugural Dahlia Cup with Catania, playing half-matches against Serie A rivals Cagliari and Fiorentina. On 15 August 2009, he made his official debut starting for Catania against Cremonese in the 2009–10 Coppa Italia. Meanwhile, he made his Serie A debut on 23 August 2009, in a match where Augustyn was sent off after receiving a second yellow in the 78th minute. He made ten league appearances, including six in the starting 11, before his season was cut short by a knee injury in April 2010. Augustyn made his return to action, coming on as a substitute for Giuseppe Bellusci, in a 1–1 draw against Chievo on 16 January 2011. Augustyn was then sent-off in the 75th minute, in a 1–1 draw against Genoa on 27 February 2011. Augustyn later played under manager Diego Simeone and described him as a "madman", though he did praised Simeone's tactics.

On 31 August 2011, he was loaned to Vicenza Calcio in Serie B, with an option to purchase half of his contract. Augustyn made his Vicenza debut on 4 September 2011, playing 90 minutes in a 1–1 draw against Ascoli. Augustyn scored his first Vincenza goal on 15 October 2011, in a 2–1 win over Hellas Verona. Though making 26 appearances for the club, Vicenza did not execute their purchase option, and therefore, the player returned to Sicily on 30 June 2012.

After returning to Catania, the club tried to sell Augustyn by the end of the summer transfer window. However, the club's attempted to sell Augustyn never happened and he failed to make a single appearance for the club until a substitute appearance on the final match-day of the 2012–13 campaign in a 2–2 away draw versus Torino.

=== Górnik Zabrze ===
With his contract at Catania expiring, Augustyn returned to Poland by signing for Górnik Zabrze on a one-year contract after playing in Italy for five-years. Augustyn was linked with a move to Sassuolo before his move to Górnik Zabrze.

Augustyn made his Górnik Zabrze debut in the opening game of the season, in a 2–1 win over Zagłębie Lubin. Augustyn started four matches until he was replaced by Antoni Łukasiewicz in half-time, in a 3–2 win over Zawisza Bydgoszcz on 30 September 2013. It revealed Augustyn suffered a foot injury on his left and wouldn't be able to train for the month. After months on the sidelines, Augustyn made his return, making his first start, against Zagłębie Lubin on 16 February 2014 before being substituted in the 26th minute by Boris Pandža, which saw Górnik Zabrze lose 3–0. Augustyn initially thought he suffered an ankle injury, but after underwent surgery, it was announced that Augustyn would be out of the 2013–14 season. At the end of the season, Augustyn had his contract extended for another season.

Ahead of the 2014–15 season, Augustyn aimed to make his return to the first team by getting back to shape. Augustyn made his return in the first team, in the opening game of the season, and scoring a header in the early minutes, in a 2–0 win over KS Cracovia. His progress from his return led foreign clubs keen to sign him. Unfortunately, Augustyn was soon injured after he tore his quadriceps that kept him out for three to six weeks. After two months on the sidelines, Augustyn made his return on 24 October 2014, in a 1–0 loss against GKS Bełchatów. His return was then short-lived when he was sent-off in the 73rd minute for a professional foul on Rafał Murawski, in a 1–1 draw against Pogoń Szczecin on 2 November 2014. As a result, Augustyn would have to serve four match ban. After making his return, Augustyn scored his second goal of the season on 6 April 2015, in a 2–2 draw against Ruch Chorzów. Later in the 2014–15 season, Augustyn was sent-off for the second time this season after a second bookable offense against Pogoń Szczecin and had to serve eight match ban.

At the end of the season, it was announced that Augustyn would leave the club, with a hinting a move back to Italy, though Greek club PAOK was among interested signing Augustyn.

=== Heart of Midlothian ===
He signed for Scottish club Heart of Midlothian ("Hearts") on 18 June 2015, subjected to international clearance, though the contract length was revealed.

Augustyn made his Hearts debut, in the opening game of the season, in a 4–3 win over St Johnstone. At the end of the 2015–16 season Hearts announced his contract would not be renewed at the end of the season.

=== Lechia Gdańsk ===
On 6 August 2017 he signed a contract with Lechia Gdańsk.

== Career statistics ==
As of match played 2 September 2023

Appearances and goals by club, season and competition
Club	Season	League			National cup (Note: Includes FA Cup, Polish Cup, Coppa Italia, Scottish FA Cup)		League cup (Note: Includes Ekstraklasa Cup, Scottish League Cup)		Other		Total	
Club	Season	Division	Apps	Goals	Apps	Goals	Apps	Goals	Apps	Goals	Apps	Goals
Bolton Wanderers	2006–07	Premier League	0	0	1	0	0	0	0	0	1	0
Legia Warsaw	2007–08	Ekstraklasa	4	0	1	0	4	0	0	0	9	0
Rimini (loan)	2008–09	Serie B	6	0	0	0	0	0	0	0	6	0
Catania	2009–10	Serie A	10	0	4	0	0	0	0	0	14	0
Catania	2010–11	Serie A	6	0	1	0	0	0	0	0	7	0
Catania	2011–12	Serie A	0	0	0	0	0	0	0	0	0	0
Catania	2012–13	Serie A	1	0	0	0	0	0	0	0	1	0
Catania	Total		17	0	5	0	0	0	0	0	22	0
Vicenza Virtus (loan)	2011–12	Serie B	26	1	0	0	0	0	0	0	26	1
Górnik Zabrze	2013–14	Ekstraklasa	5	0	0	0	—		—		5	0
Górnik Zabrze	2014–15	Ekstraklasa	17	2	1	0	—		—		18	2
Górnik Zabrze	Total		22	2	1	0	—		—		23	2
Heart of Midlothian	2015–16	Scottish Premiership	22	0	3	0	2	0	0	0	27	0
Ascoli	2016–17	Serie B	30	0	1	0	0	0	0	0	31	0
Lechia Gdańsk	2017–18	Ekstraklasa	15	2	0	0	—		0	0	15	2
Lechia Gdańsk	2018–19	Ekstraklasa	30	2	3	0	—		0	0	33	2
Lechia Gdańsk	2019–20	Ekstraklasa	12	1	1	0	—		3 (Note: Two appearances in UEFA Europa League, one appearance in Polish Super Cup)	0	15	1
Lechia Gdańsk	Total		57	5	4	0	—		2	0	63	5
Jagiellonia Białystok	2020–21	Ekstraklasa	24	0	1	0	—		—		25	0
Jagiellonia Białystok	2021–22	Ekstraklasa	13	1	1	0	—		—		14	1
Jagiellonia Białystok	Total		37	1	2	0	—		—		39	1
Wieczysta Kraków	2022–23	III liga, gr. IV	8	0	1	0	—		—		9	0
WKS Wierzbice	2022–23	Regional league	14	10	—		—		—		14	10
WKS Wierzbice	2023–24	Regional league	3	0	—		—		—		3	0
WKS Wierzbice	Total		17	10	—		—		—		17	10
Zenit Międzybórz	2023–24	IV liga Lower Silesia	0	0	—		—		—		0	0
Career total			246	19	19	0	6	0	2	0	273	19

== Honours ==
Legia Warsaw

- Polish Cup: 2007–08

Lechia Gdańsk

- Polish Cup: 2018–19
- Polish Super Cup: 2019

== Personal life ==
Augustyn speaks Polish, English and Italian.

Augustyn was married to former air hostess Monia and the ex couple have two daughters. Augustyn considered himself as claustrophobic, preferring to "like have places to go and nice restaurants."
