= Mateusz Sopoćko =

Polish footballer (born 1999)

Personal information
- Full name: Mateusz Sopoćko
- Date of birth: 26 June 1999 (age 27)
- Place of birth: Gdańsk, Poland
- Height: 1.75 m (5 ft 9 in)
- Position: Midfielder

Team information
- Current team: Cartusia Kartuzy

Youth career
- 2011–2015: AP Lechia Gdańsk
- 2015–2018: Lechia Gdańsk

Senior career*
Years	Team	Apps	(Gls)
2018–2021	Lechia Gdańsk II	18	(6)
2018–2021	Lechia Gdańsk	9	(0)
2019–2020	→ Podbeskidzie (loan)	19	(3)
2021–2022	Warta Poznań	4	(0)
2023	Cartusia Kartuzy	10	(2)
2023–2024	Olimpia Grudziądz	14	(0)
2024–2026	Sokół Kleczew	48	(10)
2026–	Cartusia Kartuzy	0	(0)
- * Club domestic league appearances and goals as of 18:18, 9 June 2026 (UTC)

Mateusz Sopoćko (born 26 June 1999) is a Polish professional footballer who plays as a midfielder for IV liga Pomerania club Cartusia Kartuzy.

== Club career ==
His first club was Akademia Piłkarska Lechia Gdańsk. In 2018, he joined the Ekstraklasa side of Lechia Gdańsk and made his debut in a 0–0 draw against Legia Warsaw. On 27 January 2021, Sopoćko completed a move to Warta Poznań.

== Career statistics ==
As of match played 15 August 2025

Appearances and goals by club, season and competition
Club	Season	League			Polish Cup		Europe		Other		Total	
Club	Season	Division	Apps	Goals	Apps	Goals	Apps	Goals	Apps	Goals	Apps	Goals
Lechia Gdańsk	2018–19	Ekstraklasa	5	0	1	0	—		—		6	0
Lechia Gdańsk	2020–21	Ekstraklasa	4	0	1	0	—		—		5	0
Lechia Gdańsk	Total		9	0	2	0	—		—		11	0
Podbeskidzie (loan)	2019–20	I liga	19	3	1	0	—		—		20	3
Warta Poznań	2020–21	Ekstraklasa	2	0	1	0	—		—		3	0
Warta Poznań	2021–22	Ekstraklasa	2	0	1	0	—		—		3	0
Warta Poznań	Total		4	0	2	0	—		—		6	0
Cartusia Kartuzy	2022–23	III liga, gr. II	10	2	—		—		—		10	2
Olimpia Grudziądz	2023–24	II liga	14	0	—		—		—		14	0
Sokół Kleczew	2023–24	III liga, gr. II	13	3	—		—		—		13	3
Sokół Kleczew	2024–25	III liga, gr. II	31	6	—		—		—		31	6
Sokół Kleczew	2025–26	II liga	4	1	—		—		0	0	4	1
Sokół Kleczew	Total		48	10	—		—		0	0	48	10
Cartusia Kartuzy	2026–27	IV liga Pomerania	0	0	—		—		—		0	0
Career total			104	15	5	0	0	0	0	0	109	15

== Honours ==
Lechia Gdańsk

- Polish Cup: 2018–19

Sokół Kleczew

- III liga, group II: 2024–25
