= Rafał Wolski =

Polish footballer

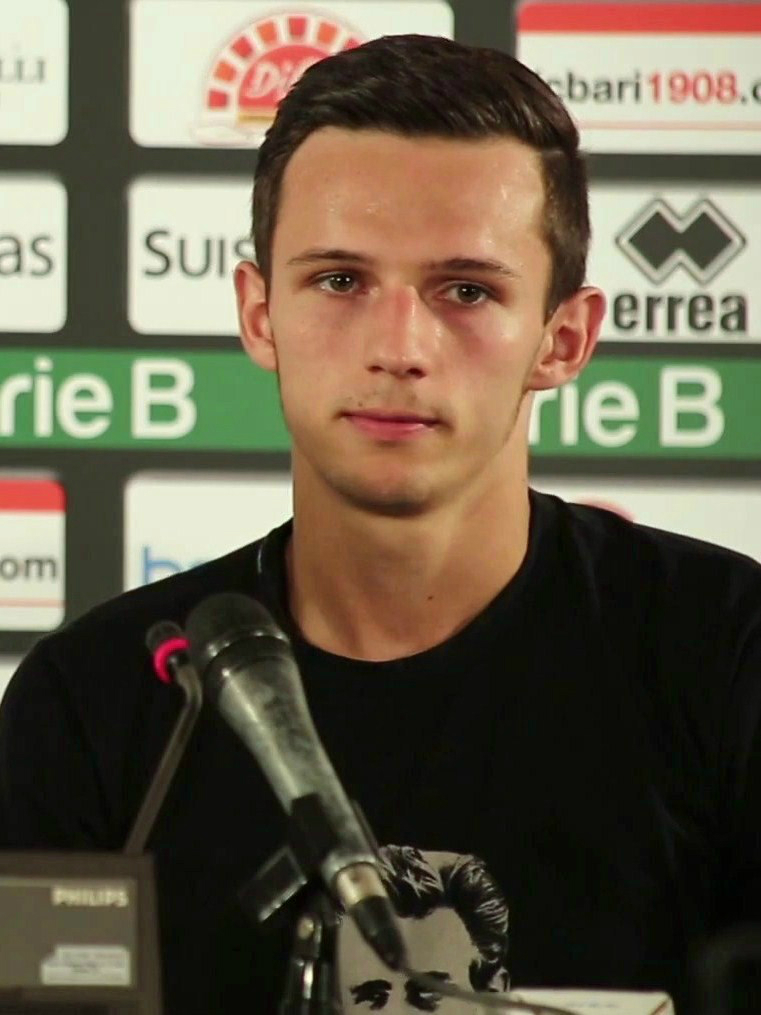
- Wolski in 2014

Personal information
- Date of birth: 10 November 1992 (age 34)
- Place of birth: Kozienice, Poland
- Height: 1.80 m (5 ft 11 in)
- Position: Midfielder

Team information
- Current team: Radomiak Radom
- Number: 27

Youth career
- 2001–2008: Jastrząb Głowaczów
- 2008–2010: Legia Warsaw

Senior career*
Years	Team	Apps	(Gls)
2010–2013	Legia Warsaw	25	(6)
2013–2016	Fiorentina	15	(1)
2014–2015	→ Bari (loan)	7	(0)
2015–2016	→ KV Mechelen (loan)	24	(2)
2016	→ Wisła Kraków (loan)	14	(4)
2016–2020	Lechia Gdańsk	70	(6)
2020–2023	Wisła Płock	63	(13)
2023–	Radomiak Radom	97	(12)

International career
2011	Poland U20	4	(1)
2013–2014	Poland U21	11	(1)
2012–2017	Poland	7	(1)
- * Club domestic league appearances and goals as of 10:26, 30 August 2026 (UTC)

Rafał Wolski (Polish pronunciation: [ˈrafaw ˈvɔlskʲi]; born 10 November 1992) is a Polish professional footballer who plays as a midfielder for and captains Ekstraklasa club Radomiak Radom.

== Career ==
On 2 May 2012, Wolski was named by Franciszek Smuda in the provisional squad of 26 players for the Euro 2012 tournament, being the only uncapped footballer (at the time) to make the list. On 22 May 2012, he made his debut for the senior side of his country in the 1–0 win over Latvia in a friendly match.

He was an unused substitute for Fiorentina in the 2014 Coppa Italia Final, which they lost 3–1 to Napoli.

On 24 February 2016, he was loaned to Polish Ekstraklasa side Wisła Kraków.

From 2016 until 2020, Wolski played for Lechia Gdańsk.

== Career statistics ==
=== Club ===
As of match played 4 May 2026

Appearances and goals by club, season and competition
Club	Season	League			National cup (Note: Includes Polish Cup, Coppa Italia, Belgian Cup)		Europe		Other		Total	
Club	Season	Division	Apps	Goals	Apps	Goals	Apps	Goals	Apps	Goals	Apps	Goals
Legia Warsaw	2010–11	Ekstraklasa	4	0	2	0	—		—		6	0
Legia Warsaw	2011–12	Ekstraklasa	21	6	5	2	6 (Note: Appearance(s) in UEFA Europa League)	0	—		32	8
Legia Warsaw	Total		25	6	7	2	6	0	—		38	8
Fiorentina	2012–13	Serie A	1	0	0	0	—		—		1	0
Fiorentina	2013–14	Serie A	14	1	1	0	0	0	—		15	1
Fiorentina	Total		15	1	1	0	—		—		16	1
Bari (loan)	2014–15	Serie B	7	0	0	0	—		—		7	0
KV Mechelen (loan)	2014–15	Jupiler Pro League	13	2	0	0	—		—		13	2
KV Mechelen (loan)	2015–16	Jupiler Pro League	11	0	3	0	—		—		14	0
KV Mechelen (loan)	Total		24	2	3	0	—		—		27	2
Wisła Kraków (loan)	2015–16	Ekstraklasa	14	4	—		—		—		14	4
Lechia Gdańsk	2016–17	Ekstraklasa	34	3	2	0	—		—		36	3
Lechia Gdańsk	2017–18	Ekstraklasa	11	1	0	0	—		—		11	1
Lechia Gdańsk	2018–19	Ekstraklasa	9	1	2	1	—		—		11	2
Lechia Gdańsk	2019–20	Ekstraklasa	16	1	3	0	1	0	0	0	20	1
Lechia Gdańsk	Total		70	6	7	1	1	0	0	0	78	7
Wisła Płock	2019–20	Ekstraklasa	0	0	—		—		—		0	0
Wisła Płock	2020–21	Ekstraklasa	7	2	0	0	—		—		7	2
Wisła Płock	2021–22	Ekstraklasa	26	4	0	0	—		—		26	4
Wisła Płock	2022–23	Ekstraklasa	30	7	1	0	—		—		31	7
Wisła Płock	Total		63	13	1	0	—		—		64	13
Radomiak Radom	2023–24	Ekstraklasa	32	2	1	0	—		—		33	2
Radomiak Radom	2024–25	Ekstraklasa	29	2	2	0	—		—		31	2
Radomiak Radom	2025–26	Ekstraklasa	30	5	1	0	—		—		31	5
Radomiak Radom	Total		91	9	4	0	—		—		95	9
Career total			309	41	23	3	7	0	0	0	339	44

=== International ===
Appearances and goals by national team and year
National team	Year	Apps	Goals
Poland
Poland	2012	3	0
Poland	2014	1	0
Poland	2017	3	1
Total		7	1

Scores and results list Poland's goal tally first, score column indicates score after each Wolski goal.

List of international goals scored by Rafał Wolski
No.	Date	Venue	Opponent	Score	Result	Competition
1	5 October 2017	Republican Stadium, Yerevan, Armenia	Armenia	6–1	6–1	2018 FIFA World Cup qualification

== Honours ==
Legia Warsaw

- Polish Cup: 2010–11, 2011–12

Lechia Gdańsk

- Polish Cup: 2018–19

Individual

- Ekstraklasa Discovery of the Season: 2011–12
- Ekstraklasa Player of the Month: July 2022
