= Czesław Nowicki =

Polish association football player

Personal information
- Full name: Czesław Nowicki
- Date of birth: 16 September 1932
- Place of birth: Dzierzgowo, Poland
- Date of death: 5 September 2002 (aged 69)
- Place of death: Gdańsk, Poland
- Position: Midfielder

Senior career*
Years	Team	Apps	(Gls)
1951–1966	Lechia Gdańsk	269	(37)
- * Club domestic league appearances and goals

Czesław Nowicki (16 September 1932 – 5 September 2002) was a Polish footballer who spent his entire professional career with Lechia Gdańsk. He was a key player in Lechia's early decades and still features highly in many appearance and goal statistics for the club.

== Lechia Gdańsk ==
Nowicki started his career in 1951, making his debut against Gwardia Warsaw in the promotion playoffs to reach the I liga. Playing as a midfielder, Nowicki was instrumental in Lechia's early years in the top division. Despite relegation back to the second division in 1953, Lechia bounced back straight away finishing runners up in the II liga for the 1954 season. After promotion Lechia stayed in the top flight for 9 seasons, a record of continuous seasons in the top division that was only broken by Lechia in the 2017-18 season when Lechia played their 10th season of top flight football in a row. Nowicki helped Lechia reach the Polish Cup final in 1955, before they lost to Legia Warsaw 5–0. In 1956 Lechia finished 3rd in the Ekstraklasa, with Nowicki playing 21 of the 22 games that season. The third placed is still Lechia's highest finish in the Ekstraklasa, a record that was only equaled in the 2018-19 season. As the teams started to slide down the division, Nowicki was still impressing for Lechia, scoring 13 goals in the 1960 season, and finishing as one of the league's highest scorers. In 1963 Nowicki dropped down to the second tier after relegation with Lechia. After 3 seasons of failing to get out of the division, Nowicki retired football. Nowicki is still one of the most successful footballers for Lechia, making the fourth most appearances for Lechia in all competitions, as well as having Lechia's second highest appearances in the Ekstraklasa (top division). In total for Lechia he played 290 times, scoring 40 goals, of which 189 appearances were in the Ekstraklasa, as were 30 of the goals. After his playing career he spent many seasons working as a coach in the youth teams.
