= Bernard Powszuk =

Polish association football player

Personal information
- Full name: Bernard Powszuk
- Date of birth: 2 March 1994 (age 32)
- Place of birth: Poland
- Height: 1.85 m (6 ft 1 in)
- Position: Defender

Youth career
- –2011: Lechia Gdańsk

Senior career*
Years	Team	Apps	(Gls)
2011–2015	Lechia Gdańsk	0	(0)
2011–2015	Lechia Gdańsk II	58	(1)
2016–2017	Concordia Elbląg	11	(0)
2017–2018	GKS Przodkowo	30	(1)
2018–2022	KP Starogard Gdański	96	(6)
2022	Grom Nowy Staw	2	(0)

International career
2014	Poland U18	1	(1)
- * Club domestic league appearances and goals

Bernard Powszuk (born 2 March 1994) is a Polish former professional footballer who played as a defender.

== Senior career ==
Powszuk began his career with Lechia Gdańsk. At Lechia, he played a total of over 50 games for the second team, but failed to make an appearance for the Lechia first team. On 1 January 2016, he moved to Concordia Elbląg, with the intention of keeping Concordia in the division. After only being in the starting side for six months, he made a move to GKS Przodkowo, before moving on to join KP Starogard Gdański in 2018.
