= Kacper Urbański =

Polish footballer (born 2004)

Personal information
- Date of birth: 7 September 2004 (age 22)
- Place of birth: Gdańsk, Poland
- Height: 1.83 m (6 ft 0 in)
- Position: Attacking midfielder

Team information
- Current team: Górnik Zabrze
- Number: 82

Youth career
- 2013–2016: AP Lechia Gdańsk
- 2016–2019: Lechia Gdańsk

Senior career*
Years	Team	Apps	(Gls)
2019–2020	Lechia Gdańsk II	6	(2)
2019–2021	Lechia Gdańsk	4	(0)
2021	→ Bologna (loan)	1	(0)
2021–2025	Bologna	30	(1)
2025	→ Monza (loan)	8	(0)
2025–2026	Legia Warsaw	21	(0)
2026–	Górnik Zabrze	14	(5)

International career^{‡}
2019	Poland U16	3	(0)
2022	Poland U18	5	(1)
2021–2023	Poland U19	18	(3)
2023	Poland U20	1	(0)
2024–	Poland U21	5	(1)
2024–	Poland	14	(0)
- * Club domestic league appearances and goals as of 13:15, 10 November 2026 (UTC) ‡ National team caps and goals as of 16:16, 6 October 2026 (UTC)

Kacper Urbański (born 7 September 2004) is a Polish professional footballer who plays as an attacking midfielder for Ekstraklasa club Górnik Zabrze and the Poland national team.

== Club career ==
=== Lechia Gdańsk ===
Born in Gdańsk, Urbański started playing football for a local footballing academy, AP Lechia Gdańsk. He joined the Lechia Gdańsk academy in 2016, playing at various youth levels with the club. He played for the Lechia Gdańsk II team for the first time on 14 November 2019 playing in the 8–0 win over Jantar Ustka. Urbański made his first senior appearance for Lechia Gdańsk the following month coming on as a substitute against Raków Częstochowa, becoming the second youngest player to have ever played in the Ekstraklasa. After the winter break, Urbański made his first start for the club against Piast Gliwice in the 1–0 win, becoming the youngest ever player to have started a match in the Ekstraklasa.

=== Bologna ===
On 1 February 2021, Urbański joined Serie A side Bologna. On 13 May 2021, he made his debut for the club in a 2–0 league defeat against Genoa: in the occasion, he became the youngest Polish player in Serie A history.

In July 2023, Urbański confirmed that he didn't renew his contract with the club, which had expired at the end of the previous month. A few weeks later, on 27 July, Bologna announced Urbański had signed a new deal valid until the end of June 2025, with an option for another year.

On 22 September 2024, he scored his first goal for Bologna in a 2–1 victory against Monza.

==== Loan to Monza ====
On 25 January 2025, Urbański joined Monza on loan until the end of the season.

=== Legia Warsaw ===
On 2 September 2025, Urbański signed for Ekstraklasa club Legia Warsaw for an initial fee of €700,000.

=== Górnik Zabrze ===
On 27 June 2026, Urbański moved to another Ekstraklasa club Górnik Zabrze on a free transfer from Legia.

== International career ==
In June 2023, Urbański was included in the Polish under-19 squad that took part in the 2023 UEFA European Under-19 Championship in Malta.

On 7 June 2024, Urbański debuted for the Polish senior squad in a friendly win against Ukraine at the Stadion Narodowy. He came on as a substitute to the injured Arkadiusz Milik in the fifth minute and provided an assist on a goal by Piotr Zieliński, before coming off as a substitute himself in the 61st minute, as Poland won the game 3–1. Later that day, Urbański was selected in the final 26-man squad for UEFA Euro 2024.

== Career statistics ==
=== Club ===
As of match played 7 November 2026

Appearances and goals by club, season and competition
Club	Season	League			National cup (Note: Includes Polish Cup, Coppa Italia)		Europe		Other		Total	
Club	Season	Division	Apps	Goals	Apps	Goals	Apps	Goals	Apps	Goals	Apps	Goals
Lechia Gdańsk II	2019–20	IV liga Pomerania	1	1	—		—		—		1	1
Lechia Gdańsk II	2020–21	IV liga Pomerania	5	1	—		—		—		5	1
Lechia Gdańsk II	Total		6	2	—		—		—		6	2
Lechia Gdańsk	2019–20	Ekstraklasa	3	0	0	0	—		—		3	0
Lechia Gdańsk	2020–21	Ekstraklasa	1	0	1	0	—		—		2	0
Lechia Gdańsk	Total		4	0	1	0	—		—		5	0
Bologna (loan)	2020–21	Serie A	1	0	0	0	—		—		1	0
Bologna	2021–22	Serie A	1	0	0	0	—		—		1	0
Bologna	2022–23	Serie A	0	0	0	0	—		—		0	0
Bologna	2023–24	Serie A	22	0	3	0	—		—		25	0
Bologna	2024–25	Serie A	7	1	1	0	4 (Note: Appearances in UEFA Champions League)	0	—		12	1
Bologna	Total		31	1	4	0	4	0	—		39	1
Monza (loan)	2024–25	Serie A	8	0	—		—		—		8	0
Legia Warsaw	2025–26	Ekstraklasa	21	0	1	0	6 (Note: Appearances in UEFA Conference League)	1	—		28	1
Górnik Zabrze	2026–27	Ekstraklasa	14	5	1	0	6 (Note: Two appearances in UEFA Champions League, two appearances and one goal in UEFA Europa League, two appearances in UEFA Conference League)	1	1 (Note: Appearance in Polish Super Cup)	0	22	6
Career total			84	8	7	0	16	2	1	0	108	10

=== International ===
As of match played 5 October 2026

Appearances and goals by national team and year
National team	Year	Apps	Goals
Poland	2024	11	0
Poland	2025	0	0
Poland	2026	3	0
Total		14	0

== Honours ==
Bologna Primavera

- Campionato Nazionale Under-17: 2021–22

Individual

- Polish Newcomer of the Year: 2024
