= Mateusz Lewandowski =

Polish footballer (born 1993)

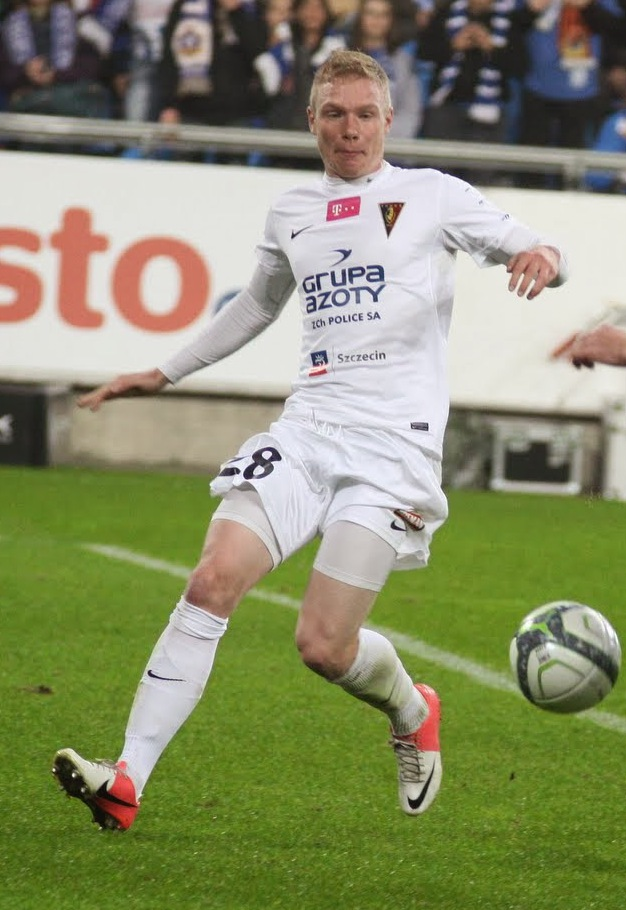
- Lewandowski with Pogoń Szczecin in 2013

Personal information
- Full name: Mateusz Lewandowski
- Date of birth: 18 March 1993 (age 33)
- Place of birth: Płock, Poland
- Height: 1.82 m (6 ft 0 in)
- Position: Midfielder

Team information
- Current team: Wisła Płock (academy director)

Youth career
- –2010: Wisła Płock

Senior career*
Years	Team	Apps	(Gls)
2010–2011	Wisła Płock	27	(0)
2011–2017	Pogoń Szczecin	99	(4)
2014–2015	→ Virtus Entella (loan)	11	(0)
2017	→ Śląsk Wrocław (loan)	13	(0)
2017–2019	Lechia Gdańsk	12	(0)
2018	→ Śląsk Wrocław (loan)	8	(0)
2019–2021	Radomiak Radom	28	(1)
2021–2022	Wisła Płock II	43	(7)
Total		241	(12)

International career
2008	Poland U15	2	(0)
2008	Poland U16	2	(1)
2009	Poland U17	3	(0)
2010–2011	Poland U18	5	(2)
2011	Poland U19	1	(0)
2012	Poland U20	1	(0)
2013–2014	Poland U21	12	(0)

Managerial career
- 2025: Wisła Płock U18
- 2025–2026: Wisła Płock II
- * Club domestic league appearances and goals

Mateusz Lewandowski (born 18 March 1993) is a Polish former professional footballer. Playing mostly as a left-back throughout his career, he was also deployed in a midfielder role. He currently serves as the director of Wisła Płock's academy.

== Career statistics ==
Appearances and goals by club, season and competition
Club	Season	League			National cup (Note: Includes Polish Cup)		Total	
Club	Season	Division	Apps	Goals	Apps	Goals	Apps	Goals
Wisła Płock	2010–11	II liga East	27	0	0	0	27	0
Pogoń Szczecin	2011–12	I liga	10	1	0	0	10	1
Pogoń Szczecin	2012–13	Ekstraklasa	16	0	0	0	16	0
Pogoń Szczecin	2013–14	Ekstraklasa	24	1	1	0	25	1
Pogoń Szczecin	2014–15	Ekstraklasa	5	0	0	0	5	0
Pogoń Szczecin	2015–16	Ekstraklasa	30	2	1	0	31	2
Pogoń Szczecin	2016–17	Ekstraklasa	14	0	4	0	18	0
Pogoń Szczecin	Total		99	4	6	0	105	4
Virtus Entella	2014–15	Serie B	11	0	0	0	11	0
Śląsk Wrocław (loan)	2016–17	Ekstraklasa	13	0	—		13	0
Lechia Gdańsk	2017–18	Ekstraklasa	10	0	1	0	11	0
Lechia Gdańsk	2018–19	Ekstraklasa	2	0	1	0	3	0
Lechia Gdańsk	Total		12	0	2	0	14	0
Śląsk Wrocław (loan)	2017–18	Ekstraklasa	8	0	—		8	0
Radomiak Radom	2019–20	I liga	19	1	1	0	20	1
Radomiak Radom	2020–21	I liga	9	0	1	0	10	0
Radomiak Radom	Total		28	1	2	0	30	1
Wisła Płock II	2020–21	IV liga Masovia II	11	2	—		11	2
Wisła Płock II	2021–22	IV liga Masovia II	32	5	—		32	5
Wisła Płock II	Total		43	7	—		43	7
Career total			241	12	10	0	251	12

== Managerial statistics ==
As of match played 3 June 2026

Managerial record by team and tenure
Team	From	To	Record							
Team	From	To	G	W	D	L	GF	GA	GD	Win %
Wisła Płock II	20 August 2025	5 June 2026	35	17	9	9	62	51	+11	48.57
Total			35	17	9	9	62	51	+11	48.57

== Honours ==
=== Player ===
Lechia Gdańsk

- Polish Cup: 2018–19

=== Manager ===
Wisła Płock II

- Polish Cup (Masovia regionals): 2025–26
