= Przemysław Macierzyński =

Polish footballer

Personal information
- Full name: Przemysław Macierzyński
- Date of birth: 11 February 1999 (age 27)
- Place of birth: Lubsko, Poland
- Height: 1.82 m (6 ft 0 in)
- Position: Forward

Team information
- Current team: Relax Grabice
- Number: 10

Youth career
- Relax Grabice
- 2012–2015: UKS SMS Łódź
- 2016–2017: → Benfica (loan)

Senior career*
Years	Team	Apps	(Gls)
2015–2019	Lechia Gdańsk II	28	(6)
2015–2019	Lechia Gdańsk	1	(0)
2019	→ Gryf Wejherowo (loan)	6	(0)
2019–2020	Miedź Legnica II	4	(1)
2020	Warta Gorzów Wielkopolski	10	(1)
2021	Carina Gubin	16	(7)
2021–2022	Unia Kunice	21	(17)
2022–	Relax Grabice	61	(62)

International career
2014–2015	Poland U16	8	(5)
2015–2016	Poland U17	10	(4)
2016–2017	Poland U18	4	(0)
2017	Poland U19	4	(0)
- * Club domestic league appearances and goals as of 20:49, 24 June 2025 (UTC)

Przemysław Macierzyński (born 11 February 1999) is a Polish footballer who plays as a forward for regional league club Relax Grabice.

== Honours ==
Carina Gubin

- IV liga Lubusz: 2020–21

Relax Grabice

- Klasa A Zielona Góra III: 2023–24
- Polish Cup (Zielona Góra - Krosno Odrzańskie regionals): 2023–24
