= Mateusz Cegiełka =

Polish association football player

Personal information
- Full name: Mateusz Cegiełka
- Date of birth: 9 October 2001 (age 25)
- Place of birth: Ostróda, Poland
- Height: 1.77 m (5 ft 10 in)
- Position: Midfielder

Team information
- Current team: Lech Poznań II
- Number: 23

Youth career
- 2012–2013: Start Działdowo
- 2013–2015: Wkra Działdowo
- 2015–2017: Stomil Olsztyn
- 2018: Lechia Gdańsk

Senior career*
Years	Team	Apps	(Gls)
2018–2020	Lechia Gdańsk II	40	(2)
2018–2020	Lechia Gdańsk	0	(0)
2020–2023	Chojniczanka Chojnice	26	(4)
2021	→ Sokół Kleczew (loan)	17	(5)
2022–2023	→ Znicz Pruszków (loan)	24	(2)
2023–2024	Znicz Pruszków	5	(0)
2024–2025	Unia Skierniewice	41	(4)
2025–2026	Mławianka Mława	32	(8)
2026–	Lech Poznań II	12	(2)

International career
2019	Poland U18	2	(0)
- * Club domestic league appearances and goals as of 11:14, 16 November 2026 (UTC)

Mateusz Cegiełka (born 9 October 2001) is a Polish professional footballer who plays as a midfielder for III liga club Lech Poznań II.

== Career ==
Cegiełka started playing with the lower-tier teams Start Działdowo (2012–2013) and Wkra Działdowo (2013–2015) in the small town of Działdowo, Masuria. At the age of 14, Cegiełka moved to Stomil Olsztyn, the largest football team in the Masuria region of Poland.

In January 2018, Cegiełka had an early big move in his footballing career moving to Ekstraklasa team Lechia Gdańsk at the age of 16. Initially, he trained with the academy teams before progressing to Lechia Gdańsk II, playing 26 times and scoring twice goals in the IV Liga Pomerania.

In September 2020, Cegiełka made a permanent move to Chojniczanka Chojnice.

== Honours ==
Unia Skierniewice

- III liga, group I: 2024–25
- Polish Cup (Łódź regionals): 2023–24
