= Przemysław Kita =

Polish footballer (born 1993)

Personal information
- Full name: Przemysław Kita
- Date of birth: 19 October 1993 (age 33)
- Place of birth: Pabianice, Poland
- Height: 1.80 m (5 ft 11 in)
- Position: Forward

Team information
- Current team: Włókniarz Pabianice
- Number: 9

Youth career
- –2009: Włókniarz Pabianice

Senior career*
Years	Team	Apps	(Gls)
2009–2011	Włókniarz Pabianice		
2011–2013	ŁKS Łódź	8	(0)
2013–2015	Cracovia	28	(3)
2015–2017	Znicz Pruszków	46	(6)
2017–2018	Warta Poznań	23	(8)
2018–2019	Olimpia Grudziądz	29	(11)
2019–2022	Widzew Łódź	32	(5)
2022–2023	Radunia Stężyca	8	(1)
2023–2024	Warta Sieradz	12	(1)
2024	Sokół Kleczew	13	(2)
2024–	Włókniarz Pabianice	51	(50)
- * Club domestic league appearances and goals as of 12:32, 30 June 2026 (UTC)

Przemysław Kita (born 19 October 1993) is a Polish professional footballer who plays as a striker for IV liga Łódź club Włókniarz Pabianice.

== Career ==
Kita started his career with Włókniarz Pabianice.
