= Henryk Kliszewicz =

Polish footballer (1949–2020)

Personal information
- Full name: Henryk Kliszewicz
- Date of birth: 2 November 1949
- Place of birth: Gdańsk, Poland
- Date of death: 13 September 2020 (aged 70)
- Place of death: Koszwały, Poland
- Position: Midfielder

Senior career*
Years	Team	Apps	(Gls)
–1973	Polonia Gdańsk		
1973–1975	Arka Gdynia		
1975–1979	Lechia Gdańsk	109	(13)
1981–1982	Olimpia Elbląg		
- * Club domestic league appearances and goals

Henryk Kliszewicz (2 November 1949 – 13 September 2020) was a Polish footballer who played as a midfielder.

== Biography ==
Born in Gdańsk, Kliszewicz started playing football with local team Polonia Gdańsk. In 1973, Kliszewicz joined Arka Gdynia, being a part of the squad that won the 1973–74 II liga and winning promotion to the I liga, Poland's top division. In the I liga, Kliszewicz made nine appearances for Arka over the course of the season, leaving at the end of the year to join Lechia Gdańsk. Kliszewicz made his Lechia league debut on 10 August 1975 against Polonia Warsaw. Over the next four seasons, Kliszewicz became a regular in the starting eleven, making a total of 109 appearances and scoring 13 goals. Kliszewicz left Lechia midway through the 1979–80 season, and it is next known that he played for Olimpia Elbląg in 1981–82. There is no information of clubs that Kliszewicz played for after Olimpia, leading to the possibility that he retired from playing in 1982.

On 13 September 2020, Kliszewicz went missing, leading to a search effort from police and fire rescue. On 18 September, his body was found by a man taking a rest on a service road. Involvement from third parties was ruled out. He was 70 at the time of his death.
