= Jerzy Czubała =

Polish footballer (1933–2017)

Personal information
- Full name: Jerzy Czubała
- Date of birth: 7 January 1933
- Place of birth: Łazy, Poland
- Date of death: 22 April 2017 (aged 84)
- Place of death: Wollongong, Australia
- Height: 1.76 m (5 ft 9 in)
- Positions: Midfielder; forward

Youth career
- Gedania Gdańsk

Senior career*
Years	Team	Apps	(Gls)
–1951	Gedania Gdańsk		
1952–1958	Lechia Gdańsk	65	(2)
1958	Resovia Rzeszów	2	(0)
1959	Lechia Gdańsk	3	(0)
1960–1962	Polonia Sydney		

Managerial career
- Polonia Sydney
- * Club domestic league appearances and goals

Jerzy Czubała (ice hockey)
- Played for: Włókniarz Gdańsk (1951), Gedania Gdańsk (1952), Kolejarz Tczew (1953–54), Stoczniowiec Gdańsk (1955–58)
- Playing career: 1951–1958

Jerzy Czubała (7 January 1933 – 22 April 2017) was a Polish footballer who played as both a forward and midfielder during the summer months and was an ice hockey player over the winter.

== Biography ==
=== Early years ===
Born in Łazy, he spent the duration of World War II in Kraków. After the war, his family moved to Gdynia where the family had a house before the war.

=== Football ===
Czubała started playing football for the youth sides with Gedania Gdańsk. In 1952 he moved to Lechia Gdańsk making his debut against Wawel Kraków. During his time with Lechia, he played in the 1955 Polish Cup final against Legia Warsaw, starting he game as Lechia lost 5-0. In the 1956 season, he played 20 times as Lechia achieved their greatest achievement in their early history by finishing 3rd in the I liga. In 1958, he briefly left Lechia to play with Resovia Rzeszów, playing 2 times over six months before returning to Lechia for the following season. After his return to Lechia, he played three more times, making a total of 83 appearances and scoring 4 goals during his spell at Lechia Gdańsk. In 1960, Czubała emigrated to Australia playing with one of the Polish diaspora teams, Polonia Sydney, retiring from playing in 1962. After retiring, he had a brief spell managing Polonia Sydney.

=== Ice hockey ===
During the winters, Czubała played ice hockey, admitting that he preferred ice hockey to football. He played for Włókniarz Gdańsk, Gedania Gdańsk, Kolejarz Tczew and Stoczniowiec Gdańsk in a career which spanned 8 years.

=== Later years ===
While in Gdańsk he graduated from Medical University of Gdańsk in 1955 after studying dentistry. After moving to Australia and retiring from football he set up a dental practice which he ran for 42 years. He died on 22 April 2017 aged 84.
