= Maciej Woźniak =

Polish footballer (born 2001)

Personal information
- Full name: Maciej Woźniak
- Date of birth: 10 April 2001 (age 25)
- Place of birth: Poznań, Poland
- Position: Goalkeeper

Team information
- Current team: Tylko Lechia Gdańsk
- Number: 1

Youth career
- –2016: Nielba Wągrowiec
- 2016–2018: Lechia Gdańsk

Senior career*
Years	Team	Apps	(Gls)
2018–2020	Lechia Gdańsk II	37	(0)
2018–2020	Lechia Gdańsk	0	(0)
2020–2021	Radunia Stężyca	5	(0)
2020–2021	Radunia Stężyca II	3	(0)
2021–2022	Mamry Giżycko	26	(0)
2022–2023	Concordia Elbląg	5	(0)
2025–	Tylko Lechia Gdańsk	18	(0)
- * Club domestic league appearances and goals as of 17:56, 30 June 2026 (UTC)

Maciej Woźniak (born 10 April 2001) is a Polish professional footballer who plays as a goalkeeper for regional league club Tylko Lechia Gdańsk.

== Career ==
=== Lechia Gdańsk ===
Maciej Woźniak started his career at Lechia Gdańsk. While at Lechia, Woźniak started playing for the Under-17's team at the age of 15, and learned from experienced Lechia goalkeeper Mateusz Bąk. In 2017 Woźniak started playing for the Under-19's. After that season Woźniak signed his first professional contract for Lechia in March 2018, signing a 1-year deal, and started training with the Lechia first team. While training with the first team, Woźniak found himself playing for the Lechia II team, becoming the first choice keeper and gaining valuable experience.

=== Radunia Stężyca ===
Despite being the second team's first choice goalkeeper for two seasons, Woźniak was unable to break into the first team, only appearing on the bench in games. In 2020 it was announced his contract would not be renewed and that he had agreed to join Radunia Stężyca for the following season.
