= Piotr Gryszkiewicz =

Polish association football player

Personal information
- Full name: Piotr Gryszkiewicz
- Date of birth: 17 June 2001 (age 25)
- Place of birth: Gdańsk, Poland
- Height: 1.74 m (5 ft 9 in)
- Position: Midfielder

Team information
- Current team: Czarni Pruszcz Gdański

Youth career
- Olivia Gdańsk
- 2010–2011: Lechia Gdańsk
- 2011–2016: AP Lechia Gdańsk
- 2016–2018: Lechia Gdańsk

Senior career*
Years	Team	Apps	(Gls)
2018–2020	Lechia Gdańsk	0	(0)
2018–2020	Lechia Gdańsk II	32	(5)
2020–2023	ŁKS Łódź	30	(0)
2023–2024	Cartusia Kartuzy	48	(14)
2024–2025	GKS Bełchatów	34	(3)
2025–2026	Wisła Płock II	13	(0)
2026	KP Starogard Gdański	17	(4)
2026–	Czarni Pruszcz Gdański	0	(0)

International career
2018	Poland U18	2	(0)
- * Club domestic league appearances and goals as of 16:09, 9 July 2026 (UTC)

Piotr Gryszkiewicz (born 17 June 2001) is a Polish professional footballer who plays as a midfielder for IV liga Pomerania club Czarni Pruszcz Gdański.

== Career ==
Gryszkiewicz started playing football at an early age with Olivia Gdańsk. In 2010, he joined the Lechia Gdańsk academy for a season, before making a switch to join AP Lechia Gdańsk. After five years of playing with the youth sides of ALPG, Gryszkiewicz returned to Lechia Gdańsk.

In 2018, Gryszkiewicz started playing with the Lechia Gdańsk II team in the IV liga Pomerania, making 32 appearances over the course of two seasons, and started training with the first team in 2019. His contract was not renewed with Lechia, and during the summer of 2020 Gryszkiewicz joined I liga team ŁKS Łódź.
