= Karol Landowski =

Polish association football player

Personal information
- Full name: Karol Landowski
- Date of birth: 23 February 2000 (age 26)
- Place of birth: Starogard Gdański, Poland
- Height: 1.77 m (5 ft 10 in)
- Position: Midfielder

Youth career
- –2011: Beniaminek 03 Starogard Gdański
- 2011–2013: KP Starogard Gdański
- 2013–2016: AP Lechia Gdańsk
- 2016–2017: Lechia Gdańsk

Senior career*
| Years | Team | Apps | (Gls) |
| 2017–2021 | Lechia Gdańsk | 0 | (0) |
| 2017–2018 | → Górnik Zabrze II (loan) | 2 | (0) |
| 2018–2021 | Lechia Gdańsk II | 51 | (6) |
| 2019–2020 | → Stomil Olsztyn (loan) | 1 | (0) |
| 2019–2020 | → Stomil Olsztyn II (loan) | 15 | (6) |
| 2021–2022 | Olimpia Grudziądz | 22 | (0) |
| Total | | 91 | (12) |
- * Club domestic league appearances and goals

Karol Landowski (born 23 February 2000) is a Polish former professional footballer who played as a midfielder.

== Biography ==
Born in Starogard Gdański, Landowski started playing football with the youth sides of Beniaminek 03 Starogard Gdański and KP Starogard Gdański. At the age of 13, Landowski moved to Gdańsk, joining AP Lechia Gdańsk, before moving to Lechia Gdańsk in 2016. For the 2017–18 season, Landowski went on loan to the Górnik Zabrze U19's, also featuring for Górnik Zabrze II, playing twice for the team in the III liga. In 2018 Landowski started to feature for Lechia Gdańsk II in the IV liga. In his first season playing for Lechia II, he made 25 appearances, scoring three goals in the process. During the autumn phase of the 2019–20 season, Landowski went on loan to I liga team Stomil Olsztyn. He made his first and only appearance for Stomil against GKS Bełchatów on 27 July 2019. Landowski didn't feature for the first team again, instead playing 15 times for their reserve team for the rest of the season. After his loan spell, Landowski once again returned to Lechia II team and stayed with them until the end of the 2020–21 season.
