= Marcel Wszołek =

Polish professional footballer

Personal information
- Full name: Marcel Wszołek
- Date of birth: 11 March 2002 (age 24)
- Place of birth: Grudziądz, Poland
- Height: 1.80 m (5 ft 11 in)
- Position: Midfielder

Youth career
- 2011–2016: Olimpia Grudziądz
- 2016–2018: Lechia Gdańsk

Senior career*
Years	Team	Apps	(Gls)
2018–2020	Lechia Gdańsk	0	(0)
2018–2020	Lechia Gdańsk II	29	(3)
2020–2023	ŁKS Łódź	9	(0)
2021–2025	ŁKS Łódź II	98	(5)
2025–2026	Zawisza Bydgoszcz	16	(0)

International career
2017	Poland U16	4	(0)
- * Club domestic league appearances and goals as of 22:06, 1 June 2026 (UTC)

Marcel Wszołek (born 11 March 2002) is a Polish professional footballer. Primarily a midfielder, he can also play in defence.

== Biography ==
=== Early years ===
Born in Grudziądz, Wszołek started playing football with the youth sides of his local team Olimpia Grudziądz. He was prolific in his youth years with Olimpia, in one season scoring 24 goals in 15 appearances, including scoring 9 goals in a 29–0 win over ROL.KO Konojady.

=== Lechia Gdańsk ===
In 2016, he joined the Lechia Gdańsk Academy, where he started to take a deeper role on the pitch, playing more commonly as a midfielder or a defender instead of holding an attacking position. In 2018 he signed his first professional contract with Lechia, and started training with the Lechia Gdańsk II team. He made his Lechia II debut on 15 August 2018, playing the full game in a 5–0 win. Wszołek never managed to progress and break into the first team, but during two years at Lechia he made a total of 29 league appearances and scored three goals for the second team. Lechia opted to not extend his contract, allowing the player to leave on a free transfer.

=== ŁKS Łódź ===
Over the summer of 2020, Wszołek joined I liga team ŁKS Łódź, initially playing for the reserve team.

=== Zawisza Bydgoszcz ===
On 8 September 2025, Wszołek signed with III liga side Zawisza Bydgoszcz.

== Honours ==
ŁKS Łódź

- I liga: 2022–23

ŁKS Łódź II

- III liga, group I: 2022–23
- IV liga Łódź: 2020–21

Zawisza Bydgoszcz

- III liga, group II: 2025–26
