= Bogdan Araminowicz =

Polish footballer

Personal information
- Full name: Bogdan Araminowicz
- Date of birth: 9 October 1930
- Place of birth: Grodno, Poland
- Date of death: 10 December 1987 (aged 57)
- Place of death: Gdańsk, Poland
- Position: Midfielder

Senior career*
Years	Team	Apps	(Gls)
1950–1952	Lechia Gdańsk	15	(0)
- * Club domestic league appearances and goals

Bogdan Araminowicz (9 October 1930 – 10 December 1987) was a Polish footballer who played as a midfielder.

== Biography ==
He is documented to have played for Lechia Gdańsk from 1950 to 1952. He made his Lechia debut on 11 June 1950 in a 3–1 win against Bzura Chodaków in the II liga. In the following season, he made 11 league and two promotion play-off appearances. In total, Lechia made 20 appearances, of which 15 were in the league. After football, he worked in construction, attaining the position of chief construction specialist. He died on 10 December 1987 aged 57, with his funeral taking place on 14 December. He is buried in the Srebrzysko Cemetery in Gdańsk.
