= Daniel Łukasik =

Polish footballer (born 1991)

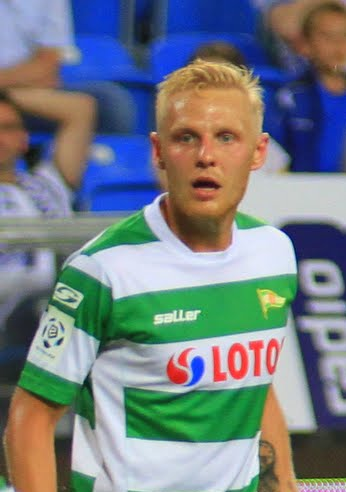
- Łukasik with Lechia Gdańsk in 2015

Personal information
- Full name: Daniel Łukasik
- Date of birth: 28 April 1991 (age 35)
- Place of birth: Giżycko, Poland
- Height: 1.80 m (5 ft 11 in)
- Position: Defensive midfielder

Team information
- Current team: Legia Warsaw U17 (assistant)

Youth career
- 2001–2005: Olimpia Miłki
- 2005–2007: Warmia Olsztyn
- 2007–2011: Legia Warsaw

Senior career*
Years	Team	Apps	(Gls)
2011–2014	Legia Warsaw	37	(0)
2013	Legia Warsaw II	1	(0)
2014–2020	Lechia Gdańsk	128	(2)
2015–2019	Lechia Gdańsk II	7	(1)
2016–2017	→ SV Sandhausen (loan)	19	(1)
2020	→ Ankaragücü (loan)	14	(0)
2020–2022	Ankaragücü	24	(2)
2022–2023	Radomiak Radom	21	(0)
2023–2024	Śląsk Wrocław	6	(0)
2023	Śląsk Wrocław II	3	(0)
Total		260	(6)

International career
2012	Poland U21	2	(0)
2012–2013	Poland	5	(1)
- * Club domestic league appearances and goals

Daniel Łukasik (born 28 April 1991) is a Polish professional football coach and former player who played as a defensive midfielder. He is currently the assistant coach of Legia Warsaw's under-17 team.

His debut for Legia Warsaw took place on 24 September 2011 in a game against GKS Bełchatów. On 17 June 2014, he joined Lechia Gdańsk.

== Career statistics ==
=== International ===
Appearances and goals by national team and year
National team	Year	Apps	Goals
Poland
Poland	2012	1	0
Poland	2013	4	1
Total		5	1

Scores and results list Poland's goal tally first, score column indicates score after each Łukasik goal.

List of international goals scored by Daniel Łukasik
No.	Date	Venue	Opponent	Score	Result	Competition
1	2 February 2013	Avenida de Manuel Alvar, Málaga, Spain	Romania	4–0	4–1	Friendly

== Honours ==
Legia Warsaw

- Ekstraklasa: 2012–13, 2013–14
- Polish Cup: 2011–12, 2012–13

Lechia Gdańsk

- Polish Cup: 2018–19
- Polish Super Cup: 2019
