= 2018–19 Polish Cup =

Totolotek Puchar Polski

Tournament details
- Country: Poland
- Dates: 7 August 2018 – 2 May 2019
- Teams: 68

Final positions
- Champions: Lechia Gdańsk (2nd title)
- Runners-up: Jagiellonia Białystok

Tournament statistics
- Matches played: 73
- Goals scored: 219 (3 per match)
- Top goal scorer(s): Konrad Kaczmarek (5 goals)

The 2018–19 Polish Cup was the 65th season of the annual Polish football knockout tournament. It began on 7 August 2018 with the first matches of the preliminary round and ended on 2 May 2019 with the final at Stadion Narodowy. Winners of the competition would qualify for the qualifying round of the 2019–20 UEFA Europa League, however eventual winners Lechia Gdańsk had qualified for Europe through their league performance.

== Format changes ==
Before the start of the 2018–19 season, the PZPN confirmed the reforming plan of the Polish Cup, introducing several changes:

- draws would be carried out separately before the start of each round,
- the rule where two of the best teams of the previous season could not be in the same draw before the semi-finals was abandoned,
- introduction of the four teams representing Poland in European competitions in the draw of the round of 64,
- the second leg matches in the quarter-finals and semi-finals had been canceled (the winner of the pair in each round met after a single match),
- Ekstraklasa teams started the game one round earlier than before (in the round of 64 instead of the round of 32),
- teams from places 13 to 18 in the I liga and teams from places 1 to 10 in the II liga as well as cup winners at the provincial level start the game one round later than before (in the round of 64 final instead of the preliminary round),
- the host of the match between teams from the same league level was randomly selected as the first in a given pair (previously an additional draw of the host of the first or only match), except for the round of 64 for teams playing in European competitions.

== Participating teams ==
2017–18 Ekstraklasa; 16 teams	2017–18 I liga 18 teams	2017–18 II liga 18 teams	Winners of 16 regional cup competitions
Arka Gdynia; Bruk-Bet Termalica Nieciecza; Cracovia; Górnik Zabrze; Jagiellonia Białystok; Lech Poznań; Lechia Gdańsk; Legia Warsaw; Korona Kielce; Piast Gliwice; Pogoń Szczecin; Sandecja Nowy Sącz; Śląsk Wrocław; Wisła Kraków; Wisła Płock; Zagłębie Lubin	Bytovia Bytów; Chojniczanka Chojnice; Chrobry Głogów; GKS Katowice; GKS Tychy; Górnik Łęczna; Miedź Legnica; Odra Opole; Olimpia Grudziądz; Podbeskidzie Bielsko-Biała; Pogoń Siedlce; Puszcza Niepołomice; Raków Częstochowa; Ruch Chorzów; Stal Mielec; Stomil Olsztyn; Wigry Suwałki; Zagłębie Sosnowiec	Błękitni Stargard; Garbarnia Kraków; GKS Jastrzębie; GKS Bełchatów; Gryf Wejherowo; Gwardia Koszalin; Legionovia Legionowo; ŁKS Łódź; MKS Kluczbork; Olimpia Elbląg; Radomiak Radom; ROW 1964 Rybnik; Rozwój Katowice; Siarka Tarnobrzeg; Stal Stalowa Wola; Warta Poznań; Wisła Puławy; Znicz Pruszków	Lechia Dzierżoniów (Lower Silesian, III liga); Elana Toruń (Kuyavian-Pomeranian, III liga); Unia Hrubieszów (Lublin, Klasa okręgowa); Falubaz Zielona Góra (Lubusz, III liga); KS Paradyż (Łódź, IV liga); GKS Drwinia (Lesser Poland, IV liga); Victoria Sulejówek (Masovian, III liga); Polonia Głubczyce (Opole, III liga); Resovia (Subcarpathian, III liga); Tur Bielsk Podlaski (Podlaskie, III liga); KP Starogard Gdański (Pomeranian, III liga); Śląsk Świętochłowice (Silesian, IV liga); Wisła Sandomierz (Holy Cross, III liga); Huragan Morąg (Warmian-Masurian, III liga); Polonia Środa Wielkopolska (Greater Poland, III liga); Bałtyk Koszalin (West Pomeranian, IV liga)

== Prize money ==
The PZPN Board of Directors determined the size of the prizes at its meeting on May 23, 2018.

Round reached	Amount
Preliminary round	5,000 PLN
Round of 64	regional cup winner: 10,000 PLN remainder teams: 5,000 PLN
Round of 32	30,000 PLN
Round of 16	60,000 PLN
Quarterfinal	125,000 PLN
Semifinal	250,000 PLN
Final	500,000 PLN
Winner	3,000,000 PLN

== Round and draw dates ==
Round	Draw date	Number of teams	Date of matches	Number of teams entered competition
Preliminary round		68 → 64	7–8 August 2018	2017–18 II liga teams from positions 11–18
Round of 64	10 August 2018	64 → 32	25–27 September, 2–4 October 2018	2017–18 Ekstraklasa teams, 2017–18 I liga teams, 2017–18 II liga teams from positions 1–10, winners of the regional cups
Round of 32	28 September 2018	32 → 16	30–31 October, 6–8 November 2018	None
Round of 16	8 November 2018	16 → 8	4–6 December 2018	None
Quarter-finals	7 December 2018	8 → 4	26–28 February, 5–7 and 12–14 March 2019	None
Semi-finals	15 March 2019	4 → 2	9–10 and 16–17 April 2019	None
Final	None	2 → 1	2 May 2019	None

== Preliminary round ==
Participating in this round were 8 teams from the 2017–18 II liga from positions 11 to 18. Teams from places 11 to 14 faced teams from places 15 to 18 in the following pairs: 11–18, 12–17, 13–16, 14–15. The matches were played on 7 and 8 August 2018. The number in brackets indicates what tier of Polish football each team competes in during the 2018–19 season.

Team 1	Score	Team 2
7 August 2018
Znicz Pruszków (3)	1–2	Wisła Puławy (4)
8 August 2018
Stal Stalowa Wola (3)	2–3	Legionovia Legionowo (4)
ROW 1964 Rybnik (3)	1–1 (a.e.t.) (5–4 p)	Gwardia Koszalin (4)
Błękitni Stargard (3)	1–2	MKS Kluczbork (4)

7 August 2018	Znicz Pruszków	1–2	Wisła Puławy	Pruszków
17:30 CEST (UTC+02:00)	Faliszewski 6'	Report	Stanisławski 33' (pen.); Popiołek 90'	Stadium: Stadion MZOS; Attendance: 170; Referee: Dawid Wiśniewski (Olsztyn)

8 August 2018	Stal Stalowa Wola	2–3	Legionovia Legionowo	Boguchwała
17:00 CEST (UTC+02:00)	Kitliński 3'; Dziubiński 30'	Report	Krawczyk 57', 60', 89' (pen.)	Stadium: Izo Arena; Attendance: 400; Referee: Marek Śliwa (Kielce)

8 August 2018	Błękitni Stargard	1–2	MKS Kluczbork	Stargard
17:30 CEST (UTC+02:00)	Baranowski 66'	Report	Reisch 90'; Makowski 90'	Stadium: Stadion Miejski; Attendance: 300; Referee: Łukasz Ostrowski (Szczecin)

8 August 2018	ROW 1964 Rybnik	1–1 (a.e.t.) (5–4 p)	Gwardia Koszalin	Rybnik
18:00 CEST (UTC+02:00)	Janik 59' (pen.)	Report	Przyborowski 79'	Stadium: Stadion MOSiR; Attendance: 241; Referee: Kornel Paszkiewicz (Wrocław)

== Bracket ==
Round of 64
3	Elana Toruń	1
2	Bytovia Bytów	3
3	Olimpia Elbląg	0
1	Śląsk Wrocław	3
3	GKS Bełchatów	1 (6)
2	Garbarnia Kraków	1 (5)
2	Sandecja Nowy Sącz	0
1	Miedź Legnica	3
3	Olimpia Grudziądz	0 (5)
1	Zagłębie Sosnowiec	0 (3)
3	Siarka Tarnobrzeg	1
1	Wisła Płock	4
4	KP Starogard Gdański	1
3	Górnik Łęczna	0
7	KS Paradyż	0
2	Puszcza Niepołomice	7
4	Huragan Morąg	3
1	Zagłębie Lubin	2
5	Śląsk Świętochłowice	0
1	Arka Gdynia	3
2	GKS Katowice	1 (4)
1	Pogoń Szczecin	1 (3)
4	Lechia Dzierżoniów	0
1	Jagiellonia Białystok	1
4	MKS Kluczbork	0
2	Podbeskidzie Bielsko-Biała	2
4	Wisła Sandomierz	3
1	Korona Kielce	2
4	Polonia Środa Wielkopolska	4
3	Radomiak Radom	3
3	Ruch Chorzów	1
2	Odra Opole	5
3	Resovia	2
2	Warta Poznań	0
1	Wisła Kraków	1 (4)
1	Lechia Gdańsk	1 (5)
5	Tur Bielsk Podlaski	1
2	Bruk-Bet Termalica Nieciecza	4
3	ROW 1964 Rybnik	1
1	Cracovia	3
5	GKS Drwinia	0
4	Wisła Puławy	1
4	Bałtyk Koszalin	1
3	Rozwój Katowice	3
6	Unia Hrubieszów	0
1	Górnik Zabrze	9
4	Legionovia Legionowo	2
2	GKS Tychy	1
3	Pogoń Siedlce	2
2	Stal Mielec	1
5	Polonia Głubczyce	0
2	Chrobry Głogów	8
2	GKS Jastrzębie	1
1	Piast Gliwice	2
2	Chojniczanka Chojnice	0
1	Legia Warsaw	1
4	Victoria Sulejówek	0
2	Raków Częstochowa	4
2	ŁKS Łódź	0
1	Lech Poznań	1
3	Gryf Wejherowo	1
2	Stomil Olsztyn	3
5	Falubaz Zielona Góra	0
2	Wigry Suwałki	1

Round of 32
2	Bytovia Bytów	0
1	Śląsk Wrocław	3
3	GKS Bełchatów	0
1	Miedź Legnica	1
3	Olimpia Grudziądz	2
1	Wisła Płock	7
4	KP Starogard Gdański	1
2	Puszcza Niepołomice	3
4	Huragan Morąg	0
1	Arka Gdynia	1
2	GKS Katowice	0
1	Jagiellonia Białystok	1
2	Podbeskidzie Bielsko-Biała	2
4	Wisła Sandomierz	3
4	Polonia Środa Wielkopolska	0
2	Odra Opole	1
3	Resovia	1
1	Lechia Gdańsk	3
2	Bruk-Bet Termalica Nieciecza	2
1	Cracovia	0
4	Wisła Puławy	0
3	Rozwój Katowice	1
1	Górnik Zabrze	1
4	Legionovia Legionowo	0
3	Pogoń Siedlce	1
2	Chrobry Głogów	2
1	Piast Gliwice	1 (2)
1	Legia Warsaw	1 (4)
2	Raków Częstochowa	1
1	Lech Poznań	0
2	Stomil Olsztyn	2
2	Wigry Suwałki	3

Round of 16
1	Śląsk Wrocław	0
1	Miedź Legnica	1
1	Wisła Płock	1
2	Puszcza Niepołomice	3
1	Arka Gdynia	0
1	Jagiellonia Białystok	2
4	Wisła Sandomierz	0
2	Odra Opole	1
1	Lechia Gdańsk	3
2	Bruk-Bet Termalica Nieciecza	1
3	Rozwój Katowice	1
1	Górnik Zabrze	4
2	Chrobry Głogów	0
1	Legia Warsaw	3
2	Raków Częstochowa	3
2	Wigry Suwałki	0

Quarterfinal
1	Miedź Legnica	2
2	Puszcza Niepołomice	0
1	Jagiellonia Białystok	2
2	Odra Opole	0
1	Lechia Gdańsk	2
1	Górnik Zabrze	1
1	Legia Warsaw	1
2	Raków Częstochowa	2

Semifinal
1	Miedź Legnica	1
1	Jagiellonia Białystok	2
1	Lechia Gdańsk	1
2	Raków Częstochowa	0

Final
1	Jagiellonia Białystok	0
1	Lechia Gdańsk	1

== Round of 64 ==
The draw for this round was conducted in the headquarter of PZPN on 10 August 2018. The matches was played on 25 to 27 September and 2 to 3 October 2018. Participating in this round were the 4 winners from the previous round, 16 teams from the 2017–18 Ekstraklasa, 18 teams from the 2017–18 I liga, 10 highest ranked teams from 2017 to 2018 II liga and 16 winners of the regional cup competitions. Games were hosted by teams playing in the lower division in the 2018–19 season.

Team 1	Score	Team 2
25 September 2018
ŁKS Łódź (2)	0–1 (a.e.t.)	Lech Poznań (1)
Chojniczanka Chojnice (2)	0–1	Legia Warsaw (1)
Ruch Chorzów (3)	1–5	Odra Opole (2)
Pogoń Siedlce (3)	2–1	Stal Mielec (2)
Polonia Głubczyce (5)	0–8	Chrobry Głogów (2)
Wisła Kraków (1)	1–1 (a.e.t.) (4–5 p)	Lechia Gdańsk (1)
Siarka Tarnobrzeg (3)	1–4	Wisła Płock (1)
Śląsk Świętochłowice (5)	0–3	Arka Gdynia (1)
Gryf Wejherowo (3)	1–3	Stomil Olsztyn (2)
26 September 2018
Lechia Dzierżoniów (4)	0–1	Jagiellonia Białystok (1)
Olimpia Elbląg (3)	0–3	Śląsk Wrocław (1)
GKS Drwinia (5)	0–1	Wisła Puławy (4)
Polonia Środa Wielkopolska (4)	4–3	Radomiak Radom (3)
Tur Bielsk Podlaski (5)	1–4	Bruk-Bet Termalica Nieciecza (2)
GKS Jastrzębie (2)	1–2	Piast Gliwice (1)
MKS Kluczbork (4)	0–2	Podbeskidzie Bielsko-Biała (2)
KS ROW 1964 Rybnik (3)	1–3	Cracovia (1)
GKS Katowice (2)	1–1 (a.e.t.) (4–3 p)	Pogoń Szczecin (1)
KS Paradyż (7)	0–7	Puszcza Niepołomice (2)
KP Starogard Gdański (4)	1–0	Górnik Łęczna (3)
Falubaz Zielona Góra (5)	0–1	Wigry Suwałki (2)
Resovia (3)	2–0	Warta Poznań (2)
Sandecja Nowy Sącz (2)	0–3	Miedź Legnica (1)
Bałtyk Koszalin (4)	1–3 (a.e.t.)	Rozwój Katowice (3)
Huragan Morąg (4)	3–2	Zagłębie Lubin (1)
Legionovia Legionowo (4)	2–1	GKS Tychy (2)
GKS Bełchatów (3)	1–1 (a.e.t.) (6–5 p)	Garbarnia Kraków (2)
Elana Toruń (3)	1–3	Bytovia Bytów (2)
27 September 2018
Olimpia Grudziądz (3)	0–0 (a.e.t.) (5–3 p)	Zagłębie Sosnowiec (1)
2 October 2018
Unia Hrubieszów (6)	0–9	Górnik Zabrze (1)
3 October 2018
Victoria Sulejówek (4)	0–4	Raków Częstochowa (2)
Wisła Sandomierz (4)	3–2	Korona Kielce (1)

== Round of 32 ==
The draw for this round was conducted in the headquarter of PZPN on 28 September 2018. The matches were played on 30–31 October and 7 November 2018. Games were hosted by teams playing in the lower division in the 2018–19 season.

Team 1	Score	Team 2
30 October 2018
Huragan Morąg (4)	0–1	Arka Gdynia (1)
Bytovia Bytów (2)	0–3	Śląsk Wrocław (1)
Raków Częstochowa (2)	1–0	Lech Poznań (1)
Pogoń Siedlce (3)	1–2	Chrobry Głogów (2)
Piast Gliwice (1)	1–1 (a.e.t.) (2–4 p)	Legia Warsaw (1)
31 October 2018
Wisła Sandomierz (4)	3–2 (a.e.t.)	Podbeskidzie Bielsko-Biała (2)
Legionovia Legionowo (4)	0–1	Górnik Zabrze (1)
Polonia Środa Wielkopolska (4)	0–1	Odra Opole (2)
Bruk-Bet Termalica Nieciecza (2)	2–0	Cracovia (1)
Wisła Puławy (4)	0–1	Rozwój Katowice (3)
Olimpia Grudziądz (3)	2–7	Wisła Płock (1)
GKS Bełchatów (3)	0–1	Miedź Legnica (1)
GKS Katowice (2)	0–1 (a.e.t.)	Jagiellonia Białystok (1)
7 November 2018
Resovia (3)	1–3	Lechia Gdańsk (1)
KP Starogard Gdański (4)	1–3	Puszcza Niepołomice (2)
Wigry Suwałki (2)	3–2	Stomil Olsztyn (2)

== Round of 16 ==
The draw for this round was conducted in the headquarter of PZPN on 8 November 2018. The matches were played on 4 to 6 December 2018.

Team 1	Score	Team 2
4 December 2018
Puszcza Niepołomice (2)	3–1	Wisła Płock (1)
Śląsk Wrocław (1)	0–1	Miedź Legnica (1)
Arka Gdynia (1)	0–2	Jagiellonia Białystok (1)
'5 December 2018
Chrobry Głogów (2)	0–3	Legia Warsaw (1)
Wisła Sandomierz (4)	0–1	Odra Opole (2)
Bruk-Bet Termalica Nieciecza (2)	1–3	Lechia Gdańsk (1)
6 December 2018
Rozwój Katowice (3)	1–4 (a.e.t.)	Górnik Zabrze (1)
Wigry Suwałki (2)	0–3	Raków Częstochowa (2)

== Quarter-finals ==
The 8 winners from Round of 16 competed in this round. The matches were played on 27 February 2019, as well as 12 to 13 March. The draw for this round was conducted in the headquarter of PZPN, Warsaw on 7 December 2018.

Team 1	Score	Team 2
27 February 2019
Górnik Zabrze (1)	1–2	Lechia Gdańsk (1)
12 March 2019
Odra Opole (2)	0–2	Jagiellonia Białystok (1)
13 March 2019
Raków Częstochowa (2)	2–1 (a.e.t.)	Legia Warsaw (1)
14 March 2019
Puszcza Niepołomice (2)	0–1	Miedź Legnica (1)

27 February 2019	Górnik Zabrze	1–2	Lechia Gdańsk	Zabrze
20:30 CET (UTC+01:00)	Angulo 90' (pen.)	Report	Mak 33'; Makowski 85'	Stadium: Ernest Pohl Stadium; Attendance: 8,462; Referee: Tomasz Musiał (Kraków)

12 March 2019	Odra Opole	0–2	Jagiellonia Białystok	Opole
17:00 CET (UTC+01:00)		Report	Klimala 73', 90+2'	Stadium: Stadion Odry; Attendance: 3,897; Referee: Krzysztof Jakubik (Siedlce)

13 March 2019	Raków Częstochowa	2–1 (a.e.t.)	Legia Warsaw	Częstochowa
17:00 CET (UTC+01:00)	Majecki 4' (o.g.); Niewulis 112'	Report	Kucharczyk 30'	Stadium: Stadion Miejski; Attendance: 3,990; Referee: Jarosław Przybył (Kluczbork)

14 March 2019	Puszcza Niepołomice	0–1	Miedź Legnica	Niepołomice
16:15 CET (UTC+01:00)		Report	Forsell 2'	Stadium: Stadion Miejski; Referee: Zbigniew Dobrynin (Łódź)

== Semi-finals ==
Team 1	Score	Team 2
9 April 2019
Jagiellonia Białystok (1)	2–1	Miedź Legnica (1)
10 April 2019
Raków Częstochowa (2)	0–1	Lechia Gdańsk (1)

9 April 2019	Jagiellonia Białystok	2–1	Miedź Legnica	Białystok
18:00 CEST (UTC+02:00)	Romanczuk 61', 90+1'	Report	Forsell 77'	Stadium: Białystok City Stadium; Attendance: 18,115; Referee: Paweł Gil (Lublin)

10 April 2019	Raków Częstochowa	0–1	Lechia Gdańsk	Częstochowa
18:00 CEST (UTC+02:00)		Report	Sobiech 17'	Stadium: Stadion Miejski; Attendance: 4,820; Referee: Szymon Marciniak (Płock)

== Final ==
2 May 2019
16:00 CEST (UTC+02:00)

Jagiellonia Białystok	0–1	Lechia Gdańsk
	Report	Sobiech 90+6'

Stadion Narodowy, Warsaw
Attendance: 44,158
Referee: Bartosz Frankowski (Toruń)

Jagiellonia Białystok	Lechia Gdańsk

GK	25	(Slovakia) Marián Kelemen
RB	2	(Slovakia) Andrej Kadlec		(substituted off) 90+7'
CB	17	(Croatia) Ivan Runje
CB	15	(Croatia) Zoran Arsenić	(yellow card) 48'
LB	19	(Iceland) Böðvar Böðvarsson
CM	20	(Serbia) Marko Poletanović		(substituted off) 90'
CM	6	(Poland) Taras Romanczuk (c)
RM	9	(Lithuania) Arvydas Novikovas
AM	11	(Spain) Jesús Imaz
LM	12	(Brazil) Guilherme Sityá
CF	98	(Poland) Patryk Klimala
Substitutes:
GK	29	(Poland) Grzegorz Sandomierski
DF	5	(Slovenia) Nemanja Mitrović
DF	7	(Poland) Jakub Wójcicki		(substituted on) 90+7'
MF	26	(Czech Republic) Martin Pospíšil
MF	77	(Slovakia) Martin Košťál
MF	99	(Poland) Bartosz Kwiecień		(substituted on) 90'
FW	30	(Poland) Maciej Twarowski
Manager:
(Poland) Ireneusz Mamrot

GK	1	(Serbia) Zlatan Alomerović
RB	3	(Portugal) João Nunes
CB	25	(Poland) Michał Nalepa
CB	26	(Poland) Błażej Augustyn	(yellow card) 67'
LB	22	(Serbia) Filip Mladenović
RCM	36	(Poland) Tomasz Makowski
CM	35	(Poland) Daniel Łukasik		(substituted off) 90+1'
LCM	6	(Poland) Jarosław Kubicki
RW	11	(Poland) Konrad Michalak		(substituted off) 69'
CF	28	(Portugal) Flávio Paixão (c)
LW	17	(Slovakia) Lukáš Haraslín		(substituted off) 90+9'
Substitutes:
GK	12	(Slovakia) Dušan Kuciak
DF	5	(Canada) Steven Vitória		(substituted on) 90+1'
DF	19	(Poland) Karol Fila
MF	8	(Poland) Michał Mak
MF	9	(Poland) Patryk Lipski		(substituted on) 90+9'
FW	29	(Poland) Mateusz Żukowski
FW	90	(Poland) Artur Sobiech		(substituted on) 69'
Manager:
(Poland) Piotr Stokowiec

Match officials:
Referee:
Bartosz Frankowski
Assistant referees:
Jakub Winkler
Adam Kupsik
Fourth official:
Paweł Raczkowski
Video assistant referee:
Tomasz Kwiatkowski
Marcin Borkowski

Match rules

- 90 minutes.
- 30 minutes of extra-time if necessary.
- Penalty shoot-out if scores still level.
- Seven named substitutes.
- Maximum of three substitutions.
