= 2019–20 Polish Cup =

Football tournament season

Totolotek Puchar Polski

Tournament details
- Country: Poland
- Dates: 6 August 2019 – 24 July 2020
- Teams: 68

Final positions
- Champions: Cracovia (1st title)
- Runners-up: Lechia Gdańsk

Tournament statistics
- Matches played: 64
- Goals scored: 198 (3.09 per match)
- Top goal scorer: Flávio Paixão (5 goals)

The 2019–20 Polish Cup was the 66th season of the annual Polish football knockout tournament. It began on 7 August 2019 with the first matches of the preliminary round and ended with the final at Arena Lublin. The 2019–20 edition of the Polish Cup was sponsored by Totolotek, making the official name Totolotek Puchar Polski. Winners of the competition qualified for the qualifying round of the 2020–21 UEFA Europa League. In the final, Cracovia beat defending champions Lechia Gdańsk 3-2 after extra time to win their first ever cup title.

== Participating teams ==
2018–19 Ekstraklasa; 16 teams	2018–19 I liga 18 teams	2018–19 II liga 18 teams	Winners of 16 regional cup competitions 16 teams
Arka Gdynia; Cracovia; Górnik Zabrze; Jagiellonia Białystok; Korona Kielce; Lech Poznań; Lechia Gdańsk; Legia Warsaw; Miedź Legnica; Piast Gliwice; Pogoń Szczecin; Śląsk Wrocław; Wisła Kraków; Wisła Płock; Zagłębie Lubin; Zagłębie Sosnowiec	Bruk-Bet Termalica Nieciecza; Bytovia Bytów; Chojniczanka Chojnice; Chrobry Głogów; Garbarnia Kraków; GKS Jastrzębie; GKS Katowice; GKS Tychy; ŁKS Łódź; Odra Opole; Podbeskidzie Bielsko-Biała; Puszcza Niepołomice; Raków Częstochowa; Sandecja Nowy Sącz; Stal Mielec; Stomil Olsztyn; Warta Poznań; Wigry Suwałki	Błękitni Stargard; Elana Toruń; GKS Bełchatów; Górnik Łęczna; Gryf Wejherowo; Pogoń Siedlce; Radomiak Radom; Resovia; ROW Rybnik; Rozwój Katowice; Ruch Chorzów; Olimpia Elbląg; Olimpia Grudziądz; Siarka Tarnobrzeg; Skra Częstochowa; Stal Stalowa Wola; Widzew Łódź; Znicz Pruszków	Zagłębie Lubin II (dolnośląskie, III liga); Chemik Bydgoszcz (kujawsko-pomorskie, III liga); Chełmianka Chełm (lubelskie, III liga); Stilon Gorzów Wielkopolski (lubuskie, III liga); Unia Skierniewice (łódzkie, III liga); Hutnik Kraków (małopolskie, III liga); Legia Warsaw II (mazowieckie, III liga); Stal Brzeg (opolskie, III liga); Stal Rzeszów (podkarpackie, III liga); Olimpia Zambrów (podlaskie, III liga); Gryf Słupsk (pomorskie, IV liga); Rekord Bielsko-Biała (śląskie, III liga); KSZO Ostrowiec Świętokrzyski (świętokrzyskie, III liga); Concordia Elbląg (warmińsko-mazurskie, IV liga); Polonia Środa Wielkopolska (wielkopolskie, III liga); Chemik Police (zachodniopomorskie, IV liga)

== Prize money ==
The PZPN Board of Directors determined the size of the prizes at its meeting on 24 April 2019.

Round reached	Amount
Round of 64	regional cup winner: 40,000 PLN remainder teams: 10,000 PLN
Round of 32	30,000 PLN
Round of 16	60,000 PLN
Quarterfinal	125,000 PLN
Semifinal	250,000 PLN
Final	500,000 PLN
Winner	3,000,000 PLN

== Round and draw dates ==
Round	Draw date	Number of teams	Date of matches	Teams entered for the competition
Preliminary round		68 → 64	6–7 August 2019	• 2018–19 II liga teams from positions 11–18
Round of 64	20 August 2019	64 → 32	6–26 September 2019	• 2018–19 Ekstraklasa teams, • 2018–19 I liga teams, • 2018–19 II liga teams from positions 1–10, • winners of the regional cups
Round of 32	27 September 2019	32 → 16	29–31 October 2019	None
Round of 16	5 November 2019	16 → 8	3–5 December 2019	None
Quarter-finals	12 December 2019	8 → 4	10–11 March – 26–27 May 2020	None
Semi-finals	28 May 2020	4 → 2	7–8 July 2020	None
Final	None	2 → 1	24 July 2020	None

== Preliminary round ==
Team 1	Score	Team 2
6 August 2019
Olimpia Elbląg (3)	2–1	ROW Rybnik (4)
7 August 2019
Skra Częstochowa (3)	1–2	Ruch Chorzów (4)
Gryf Wejherowo (3)	3–2	Siarka Tarnobrzeg (4)
No match
Błękitni Stargard (3)	3–0 (awarded)	Rozwój Katowice (4)

== Round of 64 ==
The draw for this round was conducted in the headquarter of PZPN on 20 August 2019. The matches were played on 24 to 26 September 2019. Participating in this round were the 4 winners from the previous round, 16 teams from the 2018–19 Ekstraklasa, 18 teams from the 2018–19 I liga, 10 highest ranked teams from 2018 to 2019 II liga and 16 winners of the regional cup competitions. Games were hosted by teams playing in the lower division in the 2019–20 season.

Team 1	Score	Team 2
24 September 2019
Gryf Wejherowo (3)	2–3	Lechia Gdańsk (1)
Stal Brzeg (4)	1–2	Olimpia Elbląg (3)
Zagłębie II Lubin (4)	2–2 (a.e.t.) (1–3 p)	Miedź Legnica (2)
Stilon Gorzów Wielkopolski (5)	5–1	Olimpia Zambrów (4)
Ruch Chorzów (4)	3–3 (a.e.t.) (3–4 p)	Stomil Olsztyn (2)
Legia Warsaw II (4)	2–0	Wigry Suwałki (2)
Chrobry Głogów (2)	0–2	Lech Poznań (1)
KSZO Ostrowiec Świętokrzyski (4)	1–3	Sandecja Nowy Sącz (2)
Korona Kielce (1)	0–1	Zagłębie Lubin (1)
Widzew Łódź (3)	2–0	Śląsk Wrocław (1)
25 September 2019
Puszcza Niepołomice (2)	0–2	Legia Warsaw (1)
Cracovia (1)	4–2	Jagiellonia Białystok (1)
Pogoń Siedlce (3)	1–0	Podbeskidzie Bielsko-Biała (2)
Chemik Police (4)	0–4	Stal Stalowa Wola (3)
GKS Jastrzębie (2)	1–0	Bruk-Bet Termalica Nieciecza (2)
Rekord Bielsko-Biała (4)	2–1	Concordia Elbląg (4)
Elana Toruń (3)	1–2	Radomiak Radom (2)
Chełmianka Chełm (4)	3–3 (a.e.t.) (5–4 p)	Znicz Pruszków (3)
Błękitni Stargard (3)	2–1	Wisła Kraków (1)
Chojniczanka Chojnice (2)	0–1	Raków Częstochowa (1)
Stal Rzeszów (3)	0–1	Pogoń Szczecin (1)
GKS Katowice (3)	0–0 (a.e.t.) (5–3 p)	Warta Poznań (2)
Gryf Słupsk (5)	1–3	Górnik Łęczna (3)
Hutnik Kraków (4)	2–3 (a.e.t.)	Resovia (3)
Chemik Bydgoszcz (5)	0–1	Wisła Płock (1)
GKS Bełchatów (2)	0–2	GKS Tychy (2)
Garbarnia Kraków (3)	1–2	Bytovia Bytów (3)
Polonia Środa Wielkopolska (4)	0–6	Górnik Zabrze (1)
Olimpia Grudziądz (2)	0–3	Stal Mielec (2)
26 September 2019
Unia Skierniewice (4)	1–5 (a.e.t.)	Piast Gliwice (1)
Odra Opole (2)	1–0	Arka Gdynia (1)
Zagłębie Sosnowiec (2)	0–3	ŁKS Łódź (1)

== Bracket ==
Round of 32
2	Miedź Legnica	1
2	GKS Jastrzębie	0
2	Stomil Olsztyn	0 (4)
1	Wisła Płock	0 (1)
4	Rekord Bielsko Biała	0
3	Górnik Łęczna	2
3	Widzew Łódź	2
1	Legia Warsaw	3
2	Radomiak Radom	1
2	GKS Tychy	2
1	ŁKS Łódź	2
1	Górnik Zabrze	0
3	Bytovia Bytów	2
1	Cracovia	3
3	Olimpia Elbląg	0
1	Raków Częstochowa	4
3	Błekitni Stargard	3
2	Sandecja Nowy Sącz	0
2	Stal Mielec	2
1	Pogoń Szczecin	0
3	Stal Stalowa Wola	1 (4)
3	GKS Katowice	1 (3)
3	Resovia Rzeszów	0
1	Lech Poznań	4
4	Chełmianka Chełm	0
1	Lechia Gdańsk	2
5	Stilon Gorzów Wlkp.	1
1	Zagłębie Lubin	5
4	Legia Warsaw II	1
2	Odra Opole	0
3	Pogoń Siedlce	0
1	Piast Gliwice	4

Round of 16
1 (4)	Miedź Legnica	2
2 (3)	Stomil Olsztyn	1
3	Górnik Łęczna	0
1	Legia Warsaw	2
2	GKSS Tychy	2
1	ŁKS Łódź	0
1	Cracovia	0 (4)
1	Raków Częstochowa	0 (1)
3	Błekitni Stargard	1
2	Stal Mielec	2
3	Stal Stalowa Wola	0
1	Lech Poznań	2
1	Lechia Gdańsk	3
1	Zagłębie Lubin	2
4	Legia Warsaw II	0
1	Piast Gliwice	2

Quarterfinal
2	Miedź Legnica	1
1	Legia Warsaw	2
2	GKS Tychy	1
1	Cracovia	2
2	Stal Mielec	1
1	Lech Poznań	3
1	Lechia Gdańsk	2
1	Piast Gliwice	1

Semifinal
1	Cracovia	3
1	Legia Warsaw	0
1	Lech Poznań	1 (3)
1	Lechia Gdańsk	1 (4)

Final
1	Cracovia	3
1	Lechia Gdańsk	2

== Round of 32 ==
Team 1	Score	Team 2
29 October 2019
Rekord Bielsko-Biała (4)	0–2	Górnik Łęczna (3)
Stilon Gorzów Wielkopolski (5)	1–5	Zagłębie Lubin (1)
Radomiak Radom (2)	1–2	GKS Tychy (2)
Resovia (3)	0–4	Lech Poznań (1)
Błękitni Stargard (3)	3–0	Sandecja Nowy Sącz (2)
Bytovia Bytów (3)	2–3 (a.e.t.)	Cracovia (1)
Miedź Legnica (2)	1–0 (a.e.t.)	GKS Jastrzębie (2)
ŁKS Łódź (1)	2–0	Górnik Zabrze (1)
30 October 2019
Widzew Łódź (3)	2–3	Legia Warsaw (1)
Legia Warsaw II (4)	1–0	Odra Opole (2)
Pogoń Siedlce (3)	0–4	Piast Gliwice (1)
Chełmianka Chełm (4)	0–2	Lechia Gdańsk (1)
Stal Mielec (2)	2–0	Pogoń Szczecin (1)
Stal Stalowa Wola (3)	1–1 (a.e.t.) (4–3 p)	GKS Katowice (3)
Olimpia Elbląg (3)	0–4	Raków Częstochowa (1)
31 October 2019
Stomil Olsztyn (2)	0–0 (a.e.t.) (4–1 p)	Wisła Płock (1)

== Round of 16 ==
Team 1	Score	Team 2
3 December 2019
Legia Warsaw II (4)	0–2	Piast Gliwice (1)
Górnik Łęczna (3)	0–2	Legia Warsaw (1)
4 December 2019
Stal Stalowa Wola (3)	0–2	Lech Poznań (1)
Lechia Gdańsk (1)	3–2	Zagłębie Lubin (1)
GKS Tychy (2)	2–0	ŁKS Łódź (1)
5 December 2019
Cracovia (1)	0–0 (a.e.t.) (4–1 p)	Raków Częstochowa (1)
Błękitni Stargard (3)	1–2	Stal Mielec (2)
Miedź Legnica (2)	1–1 (a.e.t.) (4–3 p)	Stomil Olsztyn (2)

== Quarter-finals ==
Team 1	Score	Team 2
10 March 2020
Lechia Gdańsk (1)	2–1	Piast Gliwice (1)
11 March 2020
Stal Mielec (2)	1–3	Lech Poznań (1)
26 May 2020
GKS Tychy (2)	1–2 (a.e.t.)	Cracovia (1)
27 May 2020
Miedź Legnica (2)	1–2	Legia Warsaw (1)

10 March 2020	GKS Tychy	1–2 (a.e.t.)	Cracovia	Tychy
18:00 CET (UTC+01:00)	Szumilas 90'	Report	Wdowiak 51'; Van Amersfoort 115'	Stadium: Tychy City Stadium; Attendance: 0 (Note: Match have been played behind closed doors without any spectators due to the COVID-19 pandemic.); Referee: Łukasz Szczech (Warsaw)

11 March 2020	Lechia Gdańsk	2–1	Piast Gliwice	Gdańsk
18:00 CET (UTC+01:00)	Gomes 57'; Paixão 64'	Report	Vida 82'	Stadium: Stadion Energa Gdańsk; Attendance: 0 (Note: Match have been played behind closed doors without any spectators due to the COVID-19 pandemic.); Referee: Krzysztof Jakubik (Siedlce)

26 May 2020	Miedź Legnica	1–2	Legia Warsaw	Legnica
20:10 CET (UTC+01:00)	Zieliński 88'		Gvilia 17'; Cholewiak 49'	Stadium: White Eagle Stadium; Attendance: 0 (Note: Match have been played behind closed doors without any spectators due to the COVID-19 pandemic.); Referee: Bartosz Frankowski (Toruń)

27 May 2020	Stal Mielec	1–3	Lech Poznań	Mielec
20:10 CET (UTC+01:00)	Nowak 45+1'		Ramírez 5'; Zhamaletdinov 34'; Jóźwiak 83'	Stadium: Stadion Stali Mielec; Attendance: 0 (Note: Match have been played behind closed doors without any spectators due to the COVID-19 pandemic.); Referee: Paweł Gil (Lublin)

== Semi-finals ==
Team 1	Score	Team 2
7 July 2020
Cracovia (1)	3–0	Legia Warsaw (1)
8 July 2020
Lech Poznań (1)	1–1 (a.e.t.) (3–4 p)	Lechia Gdańsk (1)

7 July 2020	Cracovia	3–0	Legia Warsaw	Kraków
20:00 CEST (UTC+02:00)	Wdowiak 5', 82'; Helik 14'	Report		Stadium: Marshal Józef Piłsudski Stadium; Attendance: 3,498 (Note: Match have been played with "no more than 25 percent of the number of seats allocated to the public" due to the COVID-19 pandemic.); Referee: Bartosz Frankowski (Toruń)

8 July 2020	Lech Poznań	1–1 (3–4 p)	Lechia Gdańsk	Poznań
20:00 CEST (UTC+02:00)	Ramírez 65'	Report	Paixão 62'	Stadium: Stadion Miejski; Attendance: 7,192 (Note: Match have been played with "no more than 25 percent of the number of seats allocated to the public" due to the COVID-19 pandemic.); Referee: Tomasz Musiał (Kraków)

== Final ==
24 July 2020 (Note: The match on 2 May 2020 16:00 CEST at the National Stadium in Warsaw was postponed due to the COVID-19 pandemic.)
20:00 CEST (UTC+02:00)

Cracovia	3–2 (a.e.t.)	Lechia Gdańsk
Van Amersfoort 65'; Jablonský 88'; Wdowiak 117'	90minut PZPN	Haydary 21'; Lipski 85'

Arena Lublin, Lublin (Note: The match was originally planned at the National Stadium in Warsaw, but was moved due to the COVID-19 pandemic in Poland.)
Attendance: 3,478 (Note: Match have been played with "no more than 25 percent of the number of seats allocated to the public" due to the COVID-19 pandemic.)
Referee: Paweł Raczkowski (Warsaw)

Cracovia	Lechia Gdańsk

GK	31	(Slovakia) Lukáš Hroššo
RB	2	(Romania) Cornel Râpă
RCB	39	(Poland) Michał Helik
LCB	85	(Czech Republic) David Jablonský
LB	33	(Poland) Kamil Pestka	(yellow card) 90+6'
RCM	10	(Netherlands) Pelle van Amersfoort
LCM	22	(Kosovo) Florian Loshaj		(substituted off) 113'
RW	11	(Poland) Mateusz Wdowiak	(yellow card) 62'
AM	14	(Croatia) Ivan Fiolić		(substituted off) 120+1'
LW	4	(Romania) Sergiu Hanca	(yellow card) 118'	(substituted off) 119'
CF	21	(Portugal) Rafael Lopes (c)		(substituted off) 82'
Substitutes:
GK	40	(Slovakia) Michal Peškovič
DF	3	(Slovakia) Michal Sipľak	(substituted on) 119'
DF	34	(Ukraine) Oleksiy Dytyatev	(substituted on) 120+1'
DF	87	(Bulgaria) Diego Ferraresso
MF	7	(Brazil) Thiago
MF	8	(Slovakia) Milan Dimun	(substituted on) 113'
MF	25	(Poland) Michał Rakoczy
FW	97	(Poland) Daniel Pik
FW	99	(Slovakia) Tomáš Vestenický	(substituted on) 82'
Manager:
(Poland) Michał Probierz

GK	1	(Serbia) Zlatan Alomerović	(yellow card) 54'
RB	19	(Poland) Karol Fila
RCB	25	(Poland) Michał Nalepa	(yellow card) 37'
LCB	23	(Croatia) Mario Maloča	(red card) 81'
LB	4	(Poland) Rafał Pietrzak		(substituted off) 53'
DM	6	(Poland) Jarosław Kubicki	(yellow card) 33'
RM	8	(Afghanistan) Omran Haydary		(substituted off) 83'
RCM	7	(Poland) Maciej Gajos		(substituted off) 71'
LCM	36	(Poland) Tomasz Makowski
LM	31	(Serbia) Žarko Udovičić
CF	28	(Portugal) Flávio Paixão (c)		(substituted off) 107'
Substitutes:
GK	12	(Slovakia) Dušan Kuciak
DF	20	(Brazil) Conrado	(substituted on) 53'	(yellow card) 90+8'
DF	77	(Poland) Rafał Kobryń
MF	9	(Poland) Patryk Lipski	(substituted on) 83'	(yellow card) 86'
MF	11	(Slovakia) Jaroslav Mihalík
MF	80	(Slovenia) Egzon Kryeziu	(substituted on) 107'
MF	88	(Poland) Jakub Kałuziński
FW	17	(Portugal) José Gomes
FW	24	(Poland) Łukasz Zwoliński	(substituted on) 71'
Manager:
(Poland) Piotr Stokowiec

Match officials:
Referee:
Paweł Raczkowski
Assistant referees:
Michał Obukowicz
Paulina Baranowska
Fourth official:
Tomasz Kwiatkowski
Video assistant referee:
Paweł Gil
Marcin Borkowski

Match rules

- 90 minutes.
- 30 minutes of extra-time if necessary.
- Penalty shoot-out if scores still level.
- Nine named substitutes.
- Maximum of three substitutions.
