= 2019–20 Lechia Gdańsk season =

Lechia Gdańsk
2019–20 season
- Manager: Piotr Stokowiec
- Stadium: Stadion Energa Gdańsk
- Ekstraklasa: 4th
- Polish Cup: Runners-up
- Polish Super Cup: Winners
- UEFA Europa League: Second Qualifying
- Top goalscorer: League: Flávio Paixão (14 Goals); All: Flávio Paixão (21 Goals)
- Highest home attendance: 14,008 vs Lech Poznań
- Lowest home attendance: 0 vs Arka Gdynia & Cracovia
Home colours	Away colours	Third colours

The 2019–20 Lechia Gdańsk season was the club's 76th season of existence, and their 12th continuous in the top flight of Polish football. The season covered the period from 1 July 2019 to 31 July 2020.

== Season information ==
Due to the COVID-19 pandemic Polish authorities announced on 10 March 2020 that all Ekstraklasa, I liga, and Polish Cup fixtures would be played behind closed doors without fans in attendance. Lechia played Piast Gliwice in the Polish Cup behind closed doors, before an announcement was made on 14 March that all games would be postponed until the end of March. The postponement was further delayed on 20 March with no games being played until at least 26 April. Games were allowed to resume again from 29 May, 12 weeks after the season was postponed.

== Players ==
=== First team squad ===
Note: Flags indicate national team as defined under FIFA eligibility rules; some limited exceptions apply. Players may hold more than one non-FIFA nationality.

No.	Pos.	Nation	Player
1	GK	SRB	Zlatan Alomerović
2	DF	LVA	Kristers Tobers (on loan from Liepāja) (substituted on)
4	DF	POL	Adam Chrzanowski (substituted off)
4	DF	POL	Rafał Pietrzak (substituted on)
6	MF	POL	Jarosław Kubicki
7	MF	POL	Maciej Gajos
8	MF	POL	Daniel Łukasik (substituted off)
8	FW	AFG	Omran Haydary (substituted on)
9	MF	POL	Patryk Lipski
10	FW	IDN	Egy Maulana
11	MF	SVK	Jaroslav Mihalík (on loan from Cracovia)
12	GK	SVK	Dušan Kuciak
17	MF	SVK	Lukáš Haraslín (substituted off)
17	FW	POR	José Gomes (on loan from Benfica) (substituted on)
18	FW	POL	Jakub Arak
19	DF	POL	Karol Fila
20	DF	BRA	Conrado (substituted on)
21	MF	POL	Sławomir Peszko (substituted off)

No.	Pos.	Nation	Player
22	DF	SRB	Filip Mladenović
23	DF	CRO	Mario Maloča
24	FW	POL	Lukasz Zwolinski (substituted on)
25	DF	POL	Michał Nalepa
26	DF	POL	Błażej Augustyn
27	MF	POL	Rafał Wolski (substituted off)
28	FW	POR	Flávio Paixão
30	MF	POL	Paweł Żuk
31	DF	SRB	Žarko Udovičić
32	MF	POL	Kacper Urbański
35	MF	USA	Kenny Saief (on loan from Anderlecht) (substituted on)
36	MF	POL	Tomasz Makowski
45	MF	POL	Mateusz Cegiełka
55	DF	POL	Filip Dymerski
71	GK	POL	Maciej Woźniak
77	DF	POL	Rafał Kobryń
80	MF	SVN	Egzon Kryeziu (substituted on)
90	FW	POL	Artur Sobiech (substituted off)

Key

Symbol	Meaning
Substituted on	Player arrived during the winter transfer window.
Substituted off	Player left at any point during the season after making an appearance for the first team.

=== Out on loan ===
Note: Flags indicate national team as defined under FIFA eligibility rules; some limited exceptions apply. Players may hold more than one non-FIFA nationality.

No.	Pos.	Nation	Player
4	DF	POL	Adam Chrzanowski (at Miedź Legnica from 21 January 2020 until 31 June 2020)
8	MF	POL	Daniel Łukasik (at Ankaragücü from 31 January 2020 until 31 June 2020)
17	MF	SVK	Lukáš Haraslín (at Sassuolo from 31 January 2020 until 31 June 2020)
80	MF	POL	Mateusz Sopoćko (at Podbeskidzie from 22 August 2019 until 31 June 2020)
-	FW	POL	Mateusz Żukowski (at Chojniczanka Chojnice from 27 August 2019 until 15 February 2020)

=== Transfers ===
==== In ====
No.	Pos.	Player	From	Type	Window	Fee	Date	Source
23	DF	Mario Maloča	SpVgg Greuther Fürth	Transfer	Summer	€150k	1 July 2019	
31	DF	Žarko Udovičić	Zagłębie Sosnowiec	Transfer	Summer	Free	1 July 2019	
30	DF	Paweł Żuk	Everton	Transfer	Summer	Free	1 July 2019	
7	MF	Maciej Gajos	Lech Poznań	Transfer	Summer	Free	1 July 2019	
11	MF	Jaroslav Mihalík	Cracovia	Loan	Summer	€10k	2 September 2019	
20	DF	Conrado	Figueirense FC	Transfer	Winter	Free	6 January 2020	
2	DF	Kristers Tobers	FK Liepāja	Loan	Winter	Free	17 January 2020	
24	FW	Lukasz Zwolinski	HNK Gorica	Transfer	Winter	€350k	10 February 2020	
17	FW	José Gomes	Portimonense S.C.	Loan	Winter	Free	11 February 2020	
8	FW	Omran Haydary	Olimpia Grudziądz	Transfer	Winter	€125k	11 February 2020	
80	MF	Egzon Kryeziu	NK Triglav Kranj	Transfer	Winter	?	12 February 2020	
35	MF	Kenny Saief	R.S.C. Anderlecht	Loan	Winter	Free	13 February 2020	
4	DF	Rafał Pietrzak	Mouscron	Transfer	Winter	?	20 February 2020	
		13 players				€635k		

==== Out ====
No.	Pos.	Player	To	Type	Window	Fee	Date	Source
11	MF	Konrad Michalak	FC Akhmat Grozny	Transfer	Summer	€1.5m	1 July 2019	
8	MF	Michał Mak	Wisła Kraków	Transfer	Summer	Free	1 July 2019	
-	DF	Rafał Janicki	Wisła Kraków	Transfer	Summer	Free	1 July 2019	
23	DF	Grzegorz Wojtkowiak	Lech Poznań II	Transfer	Summer	Free	1 July 2019	
5	DF	Steven Vitória	Moreirense	Transfer	Summer	Free	4 July 2019	
3	DF	João Nunes	Panathinaikos	Transfer	Summer	Free	23 July 2019	
16	MF	Ariel Borysiuk	Sheriff Tiraspol	Transfer	Summer	Free	1 August 2019	
8	FW	Romário Baldé	Gil Vicente	Transfer	Summer	Free	5 August 2019	
80	MF	Mateusz Sopoćko	Podbeskidzie Bielsko-Biała	Loan	Summer	Free	22 August 2019	
29	FW	Mateusz Żukowski	Chojniczanka Chojnice	Loan	Summer	Free	27 August 2019	
20	MF	Daniel Mikołajewski	Raków Częstochowa	Transfer	Winter	€13k	1 January 2020	
90	FW	Artur Sobiech	Fatih Karagümrük S.K.	Transfer	Winter	Free	20 January 2020	
4	DF	Adam Chrzanowski	Miedź Legnica	Loan	Winter	Free	21 January 2020	
17	MF	Lukáš Haraslín	U.S. Sassuolo Calcio	Loan	Winter	Free	31 January 2020	
35	MF	Daniel Lukasik	MKE Ankaragücü	Loan	Winter	Free	31 January 2020	
27	MF	Rafał Wolski	Wisła Płock	Transfer	Winter	Free	6 March 2020	
21	MF	Sławomir Peszko	Free Agent	Contract termination	Winter	Free	26 March 2020	
		17 players				€1.51m		

== Competitions ==
=== Friendlies ===
==== Summer ====
22 June 2019	Lechia Gdańsk	1-1	Chojniczanka Chojnice	Gdańsk
11:00 BST	Lukáš Haraslín 52'		Tomasz Mikołajczak 61'	Stadium: MOSiR Stadium

26 June 2019	Lechia Gdańsk	0-3	Hapoel Be'er Sheva	Władysławowo
16:00 BST			Nigel Hasselbaink 42'; Naor Sabag 47'; Niv Zrihan 76'	Stadium: Stadion Lekkoatletyczny COS OPO Cetniewo

28 June 2019	Lechia Gdańsk	Cancelled	Bytovia Bytów	Władysławowo
BST				Stadium: Stadion Lekkoatletyczny COS OPO Cetniewo

29 June 2019	Lechia Gdańsk	Cancelled	AEK Larnaca FC	Władysławowo
16:00 BST				Stadium: Stadion Lekkoatletyczny COS OPO Cetniewo

3 July 2019	Lechia Gdańsk	1-1	Olympiacos	Gdańsk
16:00 BST	Rafał Wolski 69'		Miguel Ángel Guerrero 90+3'	Stadium: MOSiR Stadium

6 July 2019	Lechia Gdańsk	7-1	Bytovia Bytów	Gdańsk
11:00 BST	Flávio Paixão 6', 20', 42'; Sławomir Peszko 18', 21'; Michał Rutkowski 29' (o.g.); Artur Sobiech 69'		Przemysław Lech 35'	Stadium: MOSiR Stadium

14 July 2019	Lechia Gdańsk	3-0	Elana Toruń	Gdańsk
11:00 BST	Mateusz Cegiełka 63'; Mateusz Żukowski 67'; Daniel Mikołajewski 80'			Stadium: MOSiR Stadium

==== Winter ====
16 January 2020	Lechia Gdańsk	2-3	Chojniczanka Chojnice	Gdańsk, Poland
12:00 BST	Flávio Paixão 4'; Jaroslav Mihalík 75'		Jacek Podgórski 13'; Mateusz Kuzimski 36'; Bartosz Wolski 42'	Stadium: MOSiR Stadium

20 January 2020	Lechia Gdańsk	3-0	SpVgg Greuther Fürth	Belek, Turkey
13:00 BST	Lukáš Haraslín 7'; Flávio Paixão 11'; Maciej Gajos 59' (pen.)			Stadium: IC Hotels Football Center - Pitch A

21 January 2020	Lechia Gdańsk	0-1	FC Rubin Kazan	Belek, Turkey
13:00 BST			Vyacheslav Podberyozkin 34'	Stadium: IC Hotels Football Center - Pitch A

24 January 2020	Lechia Gdańsk	1-0	Beroe Stara Zagora	Belek, Turkey
14:00 BST	Flávio Paixão 32'			Stadium: IC Hotels Football Center - Pitch A

28 January 2020	Lechia Gdańsk	2-0	FC Dynamo Moscow	Belek, Turkey
13:30 BST	Lukáš Haraslín 41'; Kristers Tobers 73'			Stadium: IC Hotels Football Center - Pitch A

31 January 2020	Lechia Gdańsk	Cancelled	FC Slovácko	Belek, Turkey
BST				Stadium: IC Hotels Football Center - Pitch A

31 January 2020	Lechia Gdańsk	2-1	ŠKF Sereď	Belek, Turkey
9:00 BST	Kristers Tobers 54'; Flávio Paixão 84'		Senad Jarovic 38'	Stadium: IC Hotels Football Center - Pitch A

8 February 2020	Lechia Gdańsk	Cancelled	Warta Poznań	Gdańsk, Poland
11:00 BST				Stadium: MOSiR Stadium

=== Polish Super Cup ===
13 July 2019	Piast Gliwice	1-3	Lechia Gdańsk	Gliwice
20:30 CEST	Patryk Sokołowski 68'		Lukáš Haraslín 2', 47'; Jarosław Kubicki 21'	Stadium: Stadion Miejski w Gliwicach; Attendance: 6,791; Referee: Paweł Raczkowski

=== Ekstraklasa ===
==== Regular season ====
19 July 2019 1	ŁKS Łódź	0-0	Lechia Gdańsk	Łódź
19:30 BST				Stadium: Stadion ŁKS; Attendance: 5,452; Referee: Paweł Gil

28 July 2019 2	Lechia Gdańsk	0-0	Wisła Kraków	Gdańsk
16:30 BST				Stadium: Stadion Energa Gdańsk; Attendance: 13,270; Referee: Krzysztof Jakubik

4 August 2019 3	Wisła Płock	1-2	Lechia Gdańsk	Płock
14:00 BST	Dominik Furman 84'		Artur Sobiech 12'; Rafał Wolski 74'	Stadium: Kazimierz Górski Stadium; Attendance: 55,11; Referee: Bartosz Frankowski

12 August 2019 4	Lechia Gdańsk	1-1	Jagiellonia Białystok	Gdańsk
17:00 BST	Artur Sobiech 25'		Ognjen Mudrinski 74'	Stadium: Stadion Energa Gdańsk; Attendance: 13,348; Referee: Mariusz Złotek

18 August 2019 5	Raków Częstochowa	2-1	Lechia Gdańsk	Bełchatów
16:30 GMT	Felicio Brown Forbes 41'; Igor Sapała 51'		Artur Sobiech 90+1' (pen.)	Stadium: Stadion GKS; Attendance: 3,607; Referee: Jaroslaw Przybyl

24 August 2019 6	Lechia Gdańsk	1-1	Śląsk Wrocław	Gdańsk
16:30 BST	Sławomir Peszko 54'		Przemysław Płacheta 37'	Stadium: Stadion Energa Gdańsk; Attendance: 13,691; Referee: Tomasz Musiał

31 August 2019 7	Piast Gliwice	1-2	Lechia Gdańsk	Gliwice
16:30 BST	Jorge Félix 87' (pen.)		Sławomir Peszko 55'; Žarko Udovičić 69'	Stadium: Stadion Piast; Attendance: 4,875; Referee: Paweł Raczkowski

14 September 2019 8	Lechia Gdańsk	2-1	Lech Poznań	Gdańsk
16:30 BST	Sławomir Peszko 23'; Michał Nalepa 33'		Christian Gytkjær 45+1'	Stadium: Stadion Energa Gdańsk; Attendance: 14,008; Referee: Tomasz Kwiatkowski

21 September 2019 9	Lechia Gdańsk	2-0	Korona Kielce	Gdańsk
16:30 BST	Maciej Gajos 36'; Lukáš Haraslín 52'			Stadium: Stadion Energa Gdańsk; Attendance: 11,708; Referee: Jarosław Przybył

28 September 2019 10	Legia Warsaw	1-2	Lechia Gdańsk	Warsaw
16:30 BST	Mateusz Wieteska 12'		Michał Nalepa 38'; Błażej Augustyn 52'	Stadium: Polish Army Stadium; Attendance: 23,892; Referee: Szymon Marciniak

5 October 2019 11	Lechia Gdańsk	1-2	Zagłębie Lubin	Gdańsk
19:00 BST	Artur Sobiech 67'		Błażej Augustyn 9' (o.g.); Damjan Bohar 63'	Stadium: Stadion Energa Gdańsk; Attendance: 8,863; Referee: Piotr Lasyk

20 October 2019 12	Arka Gdynia	2-2	Lechia Gdańsk	Gdynia
14:00 BST	Michał Nalepa 75'; Marko Vejinović 90+10'		Flávio Paixão 51'; Artur Sobiech 53'	Stadium: Stadion GOSiR; Attendance: 10,000; Referee: Tomasz Kwiatkowski

26 October 2019 13	Lechia Gdańsk	1-1	Górnik Zabrze	Gdańsk
19:00 BST	Artur Sobiech 52' (pen.)		Jesús Jiménez 82'	Stadium: Stadion Energa Gdańsk; Attendance: 9,357; Referee: Tomasz Musiał

2 November 2019 14	Cracovia	1-0	Lechia Gdańsk	Kraków
16:30 BST	Pelle van Amersfoort 90+1'			Stadium: Marshal Józef Piłsudski Stadium; Attendance: 8,612; Referee: Krzysztof Jakubik

10 November 2019 15	Lechia Gdańsk	0-1	Pogoń Szczecin	Gdańsk
16:30 BST			Zvonimir Kožulj 9'	Stadium: Stadion Energa Gdańsk; Attendance: 12,161; Referee: Jarosław Przybył

23 November 2019 16	Lechia Gdańsk	3-1	ŁKS Łódź	Gdańsk
19:00 BST	Lukáš Haraslín 24'; Flávio Paixão 28', 50'		Jan Sobociński 9'	Stadium: Stadion Energa Gdańsk; Attendance: 7,674; Referee: Wojciech Myć

1 December 2019 17	Wisła Kraków	0-1	Lechia Gdańsk	Kraków
16:30 BST			Flávio Paixão 31'	Stadium: Stadion Miejski; Attendance: 10,089; Referee: Tomasz Kwiatkowski

7 December 2019 18	Lechia Gdańsk	2-0	Wisła Płock	Gdańsk
19:00 BST	Flávio Paixão 34', 57' (pen.)			Stadium: Stadion Energa Gdańsk; Attendance: 7,021; Referee: Łukasz Szczech

15 December 2019 19	Jagiellonia Białystok	3-0	Lechia Gdańsk	Białystok
16:30 BST	Jesús Imaz 44', 82' (pen.); Tomas Prikryl 90'			Stadium: Białystok City Stadium; Attendance: 5,973; Referee: Mariusz Złotek

21 December 2019 20	Lechia Gdańsk	0-3	Raków Częstochowa	Gdańsk
14:00 BST			Daniel Bartl 58' (pen.); Sebastian Musiolik 64'; Michał Skóraś 82'	Stadium: Stadion Energa Gdańsk; Attendance: 7,894; Referee: Piotr Lasyk

7 February 2020 21	Śląsk Wrocław	2-2	Lechia Gdańsk	Wrocław
19:30 BST	Krzysztof Mączyński 71' (pen.); Michał Chrapek 90+3'		Flávio Paixão 6', 46'	Stadium: Stadion Miejski; Attendance: 10,201; Referee: Tomasz Musiał

14 February 2020 22	Lechia Gdańsk	1-0	Piast Gliwice	Gdańsk
19:30 BST	Flávio Paixão 63'			Stadium: Stadion Energa Gdańsk; Attendance: 7,339; Referee: Tomasz Kwiatkowski

23 February 2020 23	Lech Poznań	2-0	Lechia Gdańsk	Poznań
16:30 BST	Dušan Kuciak 83' (o.g.); Filip Marchwiński 90'			Stadium: Stadion Miejski; Attendance: 12,639; Referee: Piotr Lasyk

1 March 2020 24	Korona Kielce	1-2	Lechia Gdańsk	Kielce
11:30 BST	Michal Papadopulos 61'		Flávio Paixão 18'; Maciej Gajos 89'	Stadium: Kielce City Stadium; Attendance: 4,150; Referee: Paweł Raczkowski

4 March 2020 25	Lechia Gdańsk	0-2	Legia Warsaw	Gdańsk
19:30 BST			Paweł Wszołek 57'; Mateusz Cholewiak 90+6'	Stadium: Stadion Energa Gdańsk; Attendance: 13,050; Referee: Tomasz Musiał

7 March 2020 26	Zagłębie Lubin	4-4	Lechia Gdańsk	Lubin
16:30 BST	Saša Balić 16'; Filip Starzyński 40' (pen.), 59'; Bartosz Bialek 83'		Conrado 4'; Lukasz Zwolinski 24' (pen.); Jaroslav Mihalík 41', 55'	Stadium: Stadion Zagłębia Lubin; Attendance: 2,305; Referee: Paweł Gil

31 May 2020 27	Lechia Gdańsk	4-3	Arka Gdynia	Gdańsk
16:30 BST	Flávio Paixão 50' (pen.), 76', 90+6' (pen.); Łukasz Zwoliński 87'		Marko Vejinović 60' (pen.), 82' (pen.); Jarosław Kubicki 72' (o.g.)	Stadium: Stadion Energa Gdańsk; Attendance: 0 Referee: Szymon Marciniak

5 June 2020 28	Górnik Zabrze	2-2	Lechia Gdańsk	Zabrze
19:30 BST	Erik Jirka 19', 66'		Łukasz Zwoliński 79', 87'	Stadium: Ernest Pohl Stadium; Attendance: 0 Referee: Tomasz Musiał

9 June 2020 29	Lechia Gdańsk	1-3	Cracovia	Gdańsk
17:00 BST	Łukasz Zwoliński 46'		Mario Maloca 51' (o.g.); Pelle van Amersfoort 34', 89'	Stadium: Stadion Energa Gdańsk; Attendance: 0 Referee: Bartosz Frankowski

14 June 2020 30	Pogoń Szczecin	1-1	Lechia Gdańsk	Szczecin
17:00 BST	Santeri Hostikka 4'		Maciej Gajos 30'	Stadium: Stadion Florian Kryger; Attendance: 0 Referee: Jaroslaw Przybyl

===== League table =====
Pos	Team	Pld	W	D	L	GF	GA	GD	Pts	Qualification
6	Pogoń Szczecin	30	12	9	9	29	31	−2	45	Qualification for the Championship round
7	Jagiellonia Białystok	30	12	8	10	41	39	+2	44	Qualification for the Championship round
8	Lechia Gdańsk	30	11	10	9	40	42	−2	43	Qualification for the Championship round
9	Górnik Zabrze	30	10	11	9	39	38	+1	41 (Note: Head-to-head away goals: Górnik Zabrze 1, Raków Częstochowa 0.)	Qualification for the Relegation round
10	Raków Częstochowa	30	12	5	13	38	43	−5	41	Qualification for the Relegation round

Source: Ekstraklasa, 90minut
Rules for classification: 1) Points; 2) Head-to-head points; 3) Head-to-head goal difference; 4) Head-to-head goals scored; 5) Head-to-head away goals scored (only if two teams); 6) Goal difference; 7) Goals scored; 8) Fairplay ranking; 9) Draw. (Note: Head-to-head record is used only after all the matches between the teams in question have been played.)

==== Championship round ====
21 June 2020 31	Pogoń Szczecin	0-1	Lechia Gdańsk	Szczecin
11:30 BST			Kenny Saief 27'	Stadium: Stadion Florian Kryger; Attendance: 999; Referee: Paweł Gil

24 June 2020 32	Lechia Gdańsk	1-0	Piast Gliwice	Gdańsk
17:00 BST	Flávio Paixão 74' (pen.)			Stadium: Stadion Energa Gdańsk; Attendance: 3,967; Referee: Tomasz Kwiatkowski

28 June 2020 33	Jagiellonia Białystok	1-2	Lechia Gdańsk	Białystok
14:00 BST	Jakov Puljić 45+4'		Lukasz Zwolinski 47', 75'	Stadium: Białystok City Stadium; Attendance: 2,866; Referee: Bartosz Frankowski

4 July 2020 34	Lechia Gdańsk	0-3	Cracovia	Gdańsk
19:00 BST			Rafael Lopes 48'; Michal Sipľak 70'; Sergiu Hanca 90+4' (pen.)	Stadium: Stadion Energa Gdańsk; Attendance: 4,768; Referee: Pawel Raczkowski

12 July 2020 35	Lech Poznań	3-2	Lechia Gdańsk	Poznań
16:30 BST	Dani Ramírez 5'; Robert Gumny 22'; Kamil Jóźwiak 45'		Omran Haydary 42'; José Gomes 47'	Stadium: Stadion Miejski; Attendance: 6,432; Referee: Krzysztof Jakubik

15 July 2020 36	Lechia Gdańsk	0-0	Legia Warsaw	Gdańsk
19:30 BST				Stadium: Stadion Energa Gdańsk; Attendance: 5,747; Referee: Tomasz Musiał

19 July 2020 37	Śląsk Wrocław	1-2	Lechia Gdańsk	Wrocław
16:30 BST	Krzysztof Mączyński 19'		Omran Haydary 17'; Márk Tamás 56' (o.g.)	Stadium: Stadion Miejski; Attendance: 6,723; Referee: Mariusz Złotek

==== League table ====
Pos	Team	Pld	W	D	L	GF	GA	GD	Pts	Qualification
1	Legia Warsaw (C)	37	21	6	10	70	35	+35	69	Qualification for the Champions League first qualifying round
2	Lech Poznań	37	18	12	7	70	35	+35	66	Qualification for the Europa League first qualifying round
3	Piast Gliwice	37	18	7	12	41	32	+9	61	Qualification for the Europa League first qualifying round
4	Lechia Gdańsk	37	15	11	11	48	50	−2	56	
5	Śląsk Wrocław	37	14	12	11	51	46	+5	54 (Note: Points in regular season: Śląsk Wrocław - 49 pts, Pogoń Szczecin - 45 pts.)	
6	Pogoń Szczecin	37	14	12	11	37	39	−2	54	
7	Cracovia	37	16	5	16	49	40	+9	53	Qualification for the Europa League first qualifying round (Note: Cracovia qualified for the Europa League first qualifying round by winning the 2019–20 Polish Cup.)
8	Jagiellonia Białystok	37	14	10	13	48	51	−3	52	

Source: Ekstraklasa, 90minut
Rules for classification: 1) Points; 2) Points in regular season; 3) Head-to-head points in regular season; 4) Head-to-head goal difference in regular season; 5) Head-to-head goals scored in regular season; 5) Head-to-head away goals scored in regular season (if only two teams); 7) Goal difference; 8) Goals scored; 9) Fairplay ranking; 10) Play-off (only if needed to decide champion, teams for relegation or teams for UEFA competitions).
(C) Champions

=== Polish Cup ===
24 September 2019 Round of 64	Gryf Wejherowo	2-3	Lechia Gdańsk	Wejherowo
14:30 GMT	Maksymilian Hebel 3'; Bartosz Gęsior 5'		Maciej Gajos 53', 57'; Flávio Paixão 89'	Stadium: WKS Gryf Stadium

30 October 2019 Round of 32	Chełmianka Chełm	0-2	Lechia Gdańsk	Chełm
12:00 GMT			Michał Nalepa 4'; Flávio Paixão 73' (pen.)	Stadium: Municipal Stadium

4 December 2019 Round of 16	Lechia Gdańsk	3-2	Zagłębie Lubin	Gdańsk
16:45 GMT	Tomasz Makowski 54'; Lukáš Haraslín 55'; Flávio Paixão 63' (pen.)		Saša Živec 27'; Damjan Bohar 43'	Stadium: Stadion Energa Gdańsk

11 March 2020 Quarterfinal	Lechia Gdańsk	2-1	Piast Gliwice	Gdańsk
17:00 GMT	José Gomes 57'; Flávio Paixão 64'		Kristopher Vida 83'	Stadium: Stadion Energa Gdańsk

8 July 2020 Semifinals	Lech Poznań	1-1 (a.e.t.) (3-4 p)	Lechia Gdańsk	Poznań
19:00 GMT	Dani Ramírez 65'		Flávio Paixão 62'	Stadium: Stadion Miejski

24 July 2020 Final	Cracovia	3-2 (a.e.t.)	Lechia Gdańsk	Lublin
19:00 GMT	Pelle van Amersfoort 65'; David Jablonský 88'; Mateusz Wdowiak 117'		Omran Haydary 20'; Patryk Lipski 86'	Stadium: Arena Lublin

=== Europa League ===
25 July 2019 Second qualifying round - Leg 1	(Poland) Lechia Gdańsk	2-1	(Denmark) Brøndby IF	Gdańsk, Poland
18:00 BST	Flávio Paixão 26' (pen.); Patryk Lipski 63'		Simon Hedlund 59'	Stadium: Stadion Energa Gdańsk; Attendance: 25,875; Referee: John Beaton (Scotland)

1 August 2019 Second qualifying round - Leg 2	(Denmark) Brøndby IF	4-1 (a.e.t.) (5-3 agg.)	(Poland) Lechia Gdańsk	Brøndby, Denmark
18:30 BST	Paulus Arajuuri 15'; Kamil Wilczek 53'; Jesper Lindstrøm 94', 119'		Flávio Paixão 67'	Stadium: Brøndby Stadium; Attendance: 16,426; Referee: Miroslav Zelinka (Czech Republic)

== Statistics ==
			League		Polish Cup		Super Cup		Europa League		Total	
No.	Pos.	Player	Apps	Goals	Apps	Goals	Apps	Goals	Apps	Goals	Apps	Goals
1	GK	Zlatan Alomerović	7	0	6	0	0	0	0	0	13	0
2	DF	Kristers Tobers	10	0	1	0	0	0	0	0	11	0
4	DF	Adam Chrzanowski	2	0	1	0	0	0	0	0	3	0
4	DF	Rafał Pietrzak	11	0	2	0	0	0	0	0	13	0
6	MF	Jarosław Kubicki	27	0	5	0	1	1	1	0	34	1
7	MF	Maciej Gajos	30	3	5	2	1	0	1	0	37	5
8	FW	Omran Haydary	7	2	1	1	0	0	0	0	8	3
9	MF	Patryk Lipski	17	0	5	1	0	0	2	1	24	2
10	MF	Egy Maulana	1	0	0	0	1	0	0	0	2	0
11	MF	Jaroslav Mihalík	17	2	3	0	0	0	0	0	20	2
12	GK	Dušan Kuciak	30	0	0	0	1	0	2	0	33	0
17	MF	Lukáš Haraslín	17	2	3	1	1	2	2	0	23	5
17	FW	José Gomes	12	1	2	1	0	0	0	0	14	2
18	FW	Jakub Arak	7	0	1	0	0	0	0	0	8	0
19	DF	Karol Fila	31	0	5	0	1	0	2	0	39	0
20	DF	Conrado	12	1	3	0	0	0	0	0	15	1
21	MF	Sławomir Peszko	18	3	2	0	1	0	2	0	23	2
22	DF	Filip Mladenović	25	0	3	0	1	0	2	0	31	0
23	DF	Mario Maloča	27	0	4	0	1	0	0	0	32	0
24	FW	Łukasz Zwoliński	13	7	3	0	0	0	0	0	16	7
25	DF	Michał Nalepa	34	2	6	1	1	0	2	0	43	3
26	DF	Błażej Augustyn	12	1	1	0	1	0	2	0	16	1
27	MF	Rafał Wolski	16	1	3	0	0	0	1	0	20	1
28	FW	Flávio Paixão	31	14	6	5	1	0	2	2	40	21
30	DF	Paweł Żuk	2	0	0	0	0	0	0	0	2	0
31	MF	Žarko Udovičić	9	1	2	0	1	0	2	0	15	1
32	MF	Kacper Urbański	3	0	0	0	0	0	0	0	3	0
35	MF	Daniel Łukasik	15	0	2	0	1	0	2	0	20	0
35	MF	Kenny Saief	11	1	0	0	0	0	0	0	11	1
36	MF	Tomasz Makowski	28	0	5	1	1	0	2	0	36	1
55	DF	Filip Dymerski	1	0	0	0	0	0	0	0	1	0
77	DF	Rafał Kobryń	7	0	2	0	0	0	0	0	9	0
80	MF	Egzon Kryeziu	2	0	2	0	0	0	0	0	4	0
88	MF	Jakub Kałuziński	3	0	0	0	0	0	0	0	3	0
90	FW	Artur Sobiech	18	6	2	0	1	0	2	0	23	6

=== Goalscorers ===
Rank	Player	Goals
1	Flávio Paixão	21
2	Łukasz Zwoliński	7
3	Artur Sobiech	6
4	Maciej Gajos	5
4	Lukáš Haraslín	5
6	Omran Haydary	3
6	Michał Nalepa	3
8	José Gomes	2
8	Patryk Lipski	2
8	Jaroslav Mihalík	2
8	Sławomir Peszko	2
12	Błażej Augustyn	1
12	Conrado	1
12	Jarosław Kubicki	1
12	Tomasz Makowski	1
12	Kenny Saief	1
12	Žarko Udovičić	1
12	Rafał Wolski	1
12	Own Goals	1
