= 2020–21 Lechia Gdańsk season =

Lechia Gdańsk
2020–21 season
- Manager: Piotr Stokowiec
- Stadium: Stadion Gdańsk
- Ekstraklasa: 7th
- Polish Cup: Round of 16
- Top goalscorer: League: Flávio Paixão (12 goals); All: Flávio Paixão (12 goals)
Home colours	Away colours

The 2020–21 Lechia Gdańsk season was the club's 77th season of existence, and their 13th continuous in the top flight of Polish football. The season covered the period from 1 August 2020 to 30 June 2021. On 7 August 2020 the club celebrated its 75th anniversary.

== Season information ==
The 2020–21 season saw Lechia's 75th anniversary as a club. To commemorate the occasion an anniversary home and away kit were released, with each kit being used in one game during the season. The home anniversary kit was worn in the home match against Podbeskidzie Bielsko-Biała, with the away anniversary kit being worn in the away match against Zagłębie Lubin.

75 year anniversary home kit, worn in the 4–0 win over Podbeskidzie.	75 year anniversary away kit, worn in the 1–1 draw with Zagłębie Lubin.

== Players ==
=== First team squad ===
Note: Flags indicate national team as defined under FIFA eligibility rules; some limited exceptions apply. Players may hold more than one non-FIFA nationality.

No.	Pos.	Nation	Player
1	GK	SRB	Zlatan Alomerović
2	DF	POL	Rafał Pietrzak
4	DF	LVA	Kristers Tobers
5	DF	POL	Bartosz Kopacz
6	MF	POL	Jarosław Kubicki
7	MF	POL	Maciej Gajos
8	FW	AFG	Omran Haydary
9	FW	POL	Łukasz Zwoliński
10	MF	POL	Kacper Urbański (substituted off)
11	MF	SVK	Jaroslav Mihalík (on loan from Cracovia) (substituted off)
12	GK	SVK	Dušan Kuciak
15	FW	USA	Kenny Saief (on loan from R.S.C. Anderlecht)
17	FW	POL	Mateusz Żukowski
18	FW	POL	Jakub Arak (substituted off)
19	DF	POL	Karol Fila
20	DF	BRA	Conrado
21	MF	POL	Mateusz Sopoćko (substituted off)

No.	Pos.	Nation	Player
22	MF	SWE	Joseph Ceesay (substituted in)
23	DF	CRO	Mario Maloča
25	DF	POL	Michał Nalepa
28	FW	POR	Flávio Paixão
31	MF	SRB	Žarko Udovičić
32	FW	IDN	Egy Maulana
36	MF	POL	Tomasz Makowski
39	GK	POL	Eryk Mirus
55	DF	POL	Filip Dymerski
69	MF	POL	Jan Biegański (substituted in)
72	DF	POL	Filip Koperski
77	DF	POL	Rafał Kobryń (substituted off)
78	MF	UKR	Mykola Musolitin (substituted in)
80	MF	SVN	Egzon Kryeziu
83	GK	POL	Antoni Mikułko
88	MF	POL	Jakub Kałuziński

Key

Symbol	Meaning
Substituted in	Player arrived during the winter transfer window.
Substituted off	Player left at any point during the season after making an appearance for the first team.

=== Out on loan ===
Note: Flags indicate national team as defined under FIFA eligibility rules; some limited exceptions apply. Players may hold more than one non-FIFA nationality.

No.	Pos.	Nation	Player
17	MF	SVK	Lukáš Haraslín (at Sassuolo from 1 June 2020 until 31 August 2020)
79	FW	POL	Kacper Sezonienko (at Bytovia Bytów from 14 August 2020 until 31 June 2021)
55	DF	POL	Filip Dymerski (at Bytovia Bytów from 24 August 2020 until 31 June 2021)
77	DF	POL	Rafał Kobryń (at Korona Kielce from 9 January 2021 until 31 June 2021)
10	DF	POL	Kacper Urbański (at Bologna U19 from 1 February 2021 until 31 June 2021)

=== Promoted from academy ===
Note: Flags indicate national team as defined under FIFA eligibility rules; some limited exceptions apply. Players may hold more than one non-FIFA nationality.

No.	Pos.	Nation	Player
39	GK	POL	Eryk Mirus (on 1 August 2020)
72	DF	POL	Filip Koperski (on 28 January 2021)
83	GK	POL	Antoni Mikułko (on 29 January 2021)

=== Transfers ===
==== In ====
No.	Pos.	Player	From	Type	Window	Fee	Date	Source
5	DF	Bartosz Kopacz	Zagłębie Lubin	Transfer	Summer	Free	1 August 2020	
4	MF	Kristers Tobers	FK Liepāja	Transfer	Summer	€100k	1 August 2020	
15	FW	Kenny Saief	R.S.C. Anderlecht	Loan	Summer	Free	21 August 2020	
78	MF	Mykola Musolitin	Valmiera FC	Transfer	Summer	Free	25 November 2020	
69	MF	Jan Biegański	GKS Tychy	Transfer	Winter	Free	16 December 2020	
22	MF	Joseph Ceesay	Helsingborg IF	Transfer	Winter	Free	14 January 2021	

==== Out ====
No.	Pos.	Player	To	Type	Window	Fee	Date	Source
4	DF	Adam Chrzanowski	Pordenone	Transfer	Summer	Free	1 July 2020	
	MF	Marcel Wszołek	ŁKS Łódź	Transfer	Summer	Free	1 July 2020	
30	DF	Paweł Żuk	Wisła Płock	Transfer	Summer	€50k	21 July 2020	
22	DF	Filip Mladenović	Legia Warsaw	Transfer	Summer	Free	21 July 2020	
26	DF	Błażej Augustyn	Jagiellonia Białystok	Transfer	Summer	Free	1 August 2020	
71	GK	Maciej Woźniak	Radunia Stezyca	Transfer	Summer	Free	1 August 2020	
9	MF	Patryk Lipski	Piast Gliwice	Transfer	Summer	€150k	3 August 2020	
	MF	Adrian Petk	Miedź Legnica	Transfer	Summer	Free	10 August 2020	
35	MF	Daniel Lukasik	MKE Ankaragücü	Transfer	Summer	€250k	11 August 2020	
	FW	Kacper Sezonienko	Bytovia Bytów	Loan	Summer	Free	14 August 2020	
55	DF	Filip Dymerski	Bytovia Bytów	Loan	Summer	Free	24 August 2020	
45	MF	Mateusz Cegiełka	Chojniczanka Chojnice	Transfer	Summer	Free	31 August 2020	
17	MF	Lukáš Haraslín	U.S. Sassuolo Calcio	Transfer	Summer	€1.5m	1 September 2020	
77	DF	Rafał Kobryń	Korona Kielce	Loan	Winter	Free	9 February 2021	
21	MF	Mateusz Sopoćko	Warta Poznań	Transfer	Winter	Free	27 January 2021	
10	MF	Kacper Urbański	Bologna U19	Loan	Winter	€150k	1 February 2021	
11	MF	Jaroslav Mihalík	Cracovia (loaned from); SK Sigma Olomouc (sold to)	Loan Terminated	Winter	–	8 February 2021	
18	FW	Jakub Arak	Raków Częstochowa	Transfer	Winter	Free	18 February 2021	

== Competitions ==
=== Friendlies ===
==== Summer ====
8 August 2020	Raków Częstochowa	Cancelled	Lechia Gdańsk	Częstochowa
11:30 BST				Stadium: Municipal Football Stadium Raków

4 September 2020	Wisła Płock	1-3 (a.e.t.)	Lechia Gdańsk	Płock
14:30 BST	Patryk Tuszyński 77' (pen.)		Omran Haydary 16'; Flávio Paixão 26'; Lukasz Zwolinski 104' (pen.)	Stadium: Kazimierz Górski Stadium

==== Winter ====
15 January 2021	Lechia Gdańsk	3-0	Sokół Ostróda	Gdańsk
11:30 BST	Flávio Paixão 9' (pen.); Kenny Saief 45'; Jakub Arak 68'			Stadium: Gdańsk Sports Center Stadium

19 January 2021	Lechia Gdańsk	9-1	Olimpia Grudziądz	Sopot
11:30 BST	Łukasz Zwoliński 17' (pen.), 25'; Egy Maulana 29'; Jan Biegański 38'; Conrado 61'; Karol Fila 69'; Jakub Kałuziński 73'; Omran Haydary 76'; Maciej Gajos 77'		Patryk Leszczyński 47'	Stadium: Ogniwa Sopot

22 January 2021	Lechia Gdańsk	2-0	Wisła Płock	Gdańsk
13:40 BST	Maciej Gajos 6'; Alan Uryga 13 (OG)'			Stadium: Gdańsk Sports Center Stadium

=== Ekstraklasa ===
==== Regular season ====
23 August 2020 1	Warta Poznań	0–1	Lechia Gdańsk	Poznań
14:00 BST	Michał Jakóbowski (red card) 81'		Łukasz Zwoliński 66'	Stadium: Stadion przy Drodze Dębińskiej; Attendance: 2,381; Referee: Szymon Marciniak

29 August 2020 2	Lechia Gdańsk	1-3	Raków Częstochowa	Gdańsk
14:00 BST	Omran Haydary 45+3'		Marcin Cebula 46'; Vladislavs Gutkovskis 55', 76'	Stadium: Stadion Gdańsk; Attendance: 5,424; Referee: Paweł Raczkowski

13 September 2020 3	Górnik Zabrze	3-0	Lechia Gdańsk	Zabrze
16:30 BST	Jesús Jiménez 34' (pen.); Bartosz Nowak 60'; Daniel Ściślak 81'			Stadium: Ernest Pohl Stadium; Attendance: 10,270; Referee: Daniel Stefański

19 September 2020 4	Lechia Gdańsk	4-2	Stal Mielec	Gdańsk
14:00 BST	Flávio Paixão 4', 73' (pen.); Conrado 45+2'; Michał Nalepa 88'		Krystian Getinger 23'; Mateusz Mak 45'	Stadium: Stadion Gdańsk; Attendance: 4,507; Referee: Bartosz Frankowski

26 September 2020 5	Lechia Gdańsk	4-0	Podbeskidzie Bielsko-Biała	Gdańsk
16:30 BST	Aleksander Komor 13 (OG)'; Flávio Paixão 30', 42'; Łukasz Zwoliński 90+4'			Stadium: Stadion Gdańsk; Attendance: 4,877; Referee: Tomasz Kwiatkowski

28 October 2020 6	Wisła Kraków	1-3	Lechia Gdańsk	Kraków
17:00 BST	Jean Carlos 30'		Michał Nalepa 35'; Maciej Sadlok 54 (OG)'; Flávio Paixão 69' (pen.)	Stadium: Stadion Miejski; Attendance: 0 Referee: Tomasz Kwiatkowski
Note: COVID-19 pandemic in Poland

19 October 2020 7	Lechia Gdańsk	0-1	Pogoń Szczecin	Gdańsk
19:30 BST			Alexander Gorgon 23'	Stadium: Stadion Gdańsk; Attendance: 0 Referee: Szymon Marciniak
Note: COVID-19 pandemic in Poland

23 October 2020 8	Zagłębie Lubin	1-1	Lechia Gdańsk	Lubin
19:30 BST	Ľubomír Guldan 3'		Flávio Paixão 72' (pen.)	Stadium: Stadion Zagłębia Lubin; Attendance: 0 Referee: Wojciech Myć
Note: COVID-19 pandemic in Poland

20 November 2020 9	Lechia Gdańsk	3-2	Śląsk Wrocław	Gdańsk
17:00 BST	Conrado 56'; Flávio Paixão 66'; Łukasz Zwoliński 82'		Róbert Pich 20'; Bartłomiej Pawłowski 79'	Stadium: Stadion Gdańsk; Attendance: 0 Referee: Krzysztof Jakubik
Note: COVID-19 pandemic in Poland

23 November 2020 10	Piast Gliwice	2-0	Lechia Gdańsk	Gliwice
17:00 BST	Jakub Świerczok 3' (pen.); Jakub Czerwiński 32'			Stadium: Stadion Piast; Attendance: 0 Referee: Tomasz Kwiatkowski
Note: COVID-19 pandemic in Poland

30 November 2020 11	Lechia Gdańsk	0-1	Lech Poznań	Gdańsk
17:00 BST			Mikael Ishak 84' (pen.)	Stadium: Stadion Gdańsk; Attendance: 0 Referee: Łukasz Szczch
Note: COVID-19 pandemic in Poland

5 December 2020 12	Legia Warsaw	2-0	Lechia Gdańsk	Warsaw
19:00 BST	Tomáš Pekhart 61'; Rafael Lopes 90+5'			Stadium: Polish Army Stadium; Attendance: 0 Referee: Paweł Gil
Note: COVID-19 pandemic in Poland

14 December 2020 13	Lechia Gdańsk	0-1	Wisła Płock	Gdańsk
19:00 BST			Dušan Lagator 65'	Stadium: Stadion Gdańsk; Attendance: 0 Referee: Damian Sylwestrzak
Note: COVID-19 pandemic in Poland

19 December 2020 14	Cracovia	0-3	Lechia Gdańsk	Kraków
16:30 BST			Rafał Pietrzak 15'; Maciej Gajos 81'; Jaroslav Mihalík 90+4'	Stadium: Marshal Józef Piłsudski Stadium; Attendance: 0 Referee: Krzysztof Jakubik
Note: COVID-19 pandemic in Poland

30 January 2021 15	Lechia Gdańsk	0-2	Jagiellonia Białystok	Gdańsk
16:30 BST			Jesús Imaz 3'; Jakov Puljić 84'	Stadium: Stadion Gdańsk; Attendance: 0 Referee: Bartosz Frankowski
Note: COVID-19 pandemic in Poland

5 February 2021 16	Lechia Gdańsk	1-1	Warta Poznań	Gdańsk
17:00 BST	Michał Nalepa 33'		Mariusz Rybicki 72'	Stadium: Stadion Gdańsk; Attendance: 0 Referee: Szymon Marciniak
Note: COVID-19 pandemic in Poland

13 February 2021 17	Raków Częstochowa	0-1	Lechia Gdańsk	Bełchatów
19:00 BST			Jarosław Kubicki 2'	Stadium: Stadion GKS; Attendance: 0 Referee: Paweł Raczkowski
Note: COVID-19 pandemic in Poland

20 February 2021 18	Lechia Gdańsk	2-0	Górnik Zabrze	Gdańsk
19:00 BST	Maciej Gajos 24'; Flávio Paixão 41'			Stadium: Stadion Gdańsk; Attendance: 0 Referee: Damian Sylwestrzak
Note: COVID-19 pandemic in Poland

27 February 2021 19	Stal Mielec	0-1	Lechia Gdańsk	Mielec
14:00 BST			Łukasz Zwoliński 45'	Stadium: Stadion Stali Mielec; Attendance: 0 Referee: Łukasz Szczech
Note: COVID-19 pandemic in Poland

6 March 2021 20	Podbeskidzie Bielsko-Biała	2-2	Lechia Gdańsk	Bielsko-Biała
14:00 BST	Milan Rundić 31' (pen.); Kamil Biliński 88'		Conrado 44'; Bartosz Kopacz 86'	Stadium: Stadion Miejski; Attendance: 0 Referee: Zbigniew Dobrynin
Note: COVID-19 pandemic in Poland

13 March 2021 21	Lechia Gdańsk	2-0	Wisła Kraków	Gdańsk
16:30 BST	Flávio Paixão 64' (pen.); Žarko Udovičić 90+4'			Stadium: Stadion Gdańsk; Attendance: 0 Referee: Jarosław Przybył
Note: COVID-19 pandemic in Poland

19 March 2021 22	Pogoń Szczecin	1-0	Lechia Gdańsk	Szczecin
19:30 BST	Michał Kucharczyk 69'			Stadium: Stadion im. Floriana Krygiera; Attendance: 0 Referee: Tomasz Kwiatkowski
Note: COVID-19 pandemic in Poland

5 April 2021 23	Lechia Gdańsk	3-1	Zagłębie Lubin	Gdańsk
19:00 BST	Łukasz Zwoliński 6'; Mario Maloča 23'; Žarko Udovičić 64'		Patryk Szysz 45+1'	Stadium: Stadion Gdańsk; Attendance: 0 Referee: Krzysztof Jakubik
Note: COVID-19 pandemic in Poland

10 April 2021 24	Śląsk Wrocław	1-1	Lechia Gdańsk	Wrocław
19:00 BST	Erik Expósito 8'		Tomasz Makowski 34'	Stadium: Stadion Miejski; Attendance: 0 Referee: Piotr Lasyk
Note: COVID-19 pandemic in Poland

17 April 2021 25	Lechia Gdańsk	2-2	Piast Gliwice	Gdańsk
14:00 BST	Łukasz Zwoliński 87'; Flávio Paixão 90+5' (pen.)		Dominik Steczyk 29'; Patryk Sokołowski 48'	Stadium: Stadion Gdańsk; Attendance: 0 Referee: Bartosz Frankowski
Note: COVID-19 pandemic in Poland

20 April 2021 26	Lech Poznań	3-0	Lechia Gdańsk	Poznań
19:30 BST	Michał Skóraś 52'; Mikael Ishak 57' (pen.); Dani Ramírez 65'			Stadium: Stadion Miejski; Attendance: 0 Referee: Paweł Gil
Note: COVID-19 pandemic in Poland

25 April 2021 27	Lechia Gdańsk	0-1	Legia Warsaw	Gdańsk
16:30 BST			Tomáš Pekhart 71' (pen.)	Stadium: Stadion Gdańsk; Attendance: 0 Referee: Jarosław Przybył
Note: COVID-19 pandemic in Poland

30 April 2021 28	Wisła Płock	1-3	Lechia Gdańsk	Płock
17:00 BST	Dawid Kocyła 74'		Flávio Paixão 6' (pen.); Bartosz Kopacz 81'; Joseph Ceesay 90+5'	Stadium: Stadion im. Kazimierza Górskiego; Attendance: 0 Referee: Łukasz Szczech
Note: COVID-19 pandemic in Poland

8 May 2021 29	Lechia Gdańsk	1-1	Cracovia	Gdańsk
16:30 BST	Flávio Paixão 69'		Cornel Râpă 25'	Stadium: Stadion Gdańsk; Attendance: 0 Referee: Paweł Raczkowski
Note: COVID-19 pandemic in Poland

16 May 2021 30	Jagiellonia Białystok	2-1	Lechia Gdańsk	Białystok
16:30 BST	Jakov Puljić 9' (pen.); Tomáš Přikryl 78'		Karol Fila 61'	Stadium: Stadion Miejski; Attendance: 4.572; Referee: Krzysztof Jakubik

===== League table =====
Pos	Team	Pld	W	D	L	GF	GA	GD	Pts
5	Warta Poznań	30	13	4	13	33	32	+1	43 (Note: Head-to-head points: Śląsk Wrocław 6, Warta Poznań 0.)
6	Piast Gliwice	30	11	9	10	39	32	+7	42 (Note: Head-to-head points: Piast Gliwice 4, Lechia Gdańsk 1.)
7	Lechia Gdańsk	30	12	6	12	40	37	+3	42
8	Zagłębie Lubin	30	11	8	11	38	40	−2	41
9	Jagiellonia Białystok	30	10	7	13	39	48	−9	37 (Note: Head-to-head points: Jagiellonia Białystok 9, Górnik Zabrze 5, Lech Poznań 2.)

Source: ekstraklasa.org
Rules for classification: 1) Points; 2) Head-to-head points; 3) Head-to-head goal difference; 4) Head-to-head goals scored; 5) Head-to-head away goals scored (only if between two teams); 6) Goal difference; 7) Goals scored; 8) Number of wins; 9) Number of away wins; 10) Fairplay ranking; 11) Draw

=== Polish Cup ===
19 August 2020 Round of 64	Stal Stalowa Wola	0–4	Lechia Gdańsk	Stalowa Wola
15:30 GMT		90minut	Karol Fila 18'; Łukasz Zwoliński 23'; Maciej Gajos 53'; Jakub Kałuziński 68'	Stadium: Podkarpackie Centrum Piłki Nożnej; Attendance: 850; Referee: Albert Różycki (Łódź)

17 November 2020 Round of 32	Olimpia Grudziądz	0–1	Lechia Gdańsk	Grudziądz
16:40 GMT			Lukasz Zwolinski 64' (pen.)	Stadium: Bronisław Malinowski Stadium; Attendance: 0
Note: COVID-19 pandemic in Poland

9 February 2021 Round of 16	Puszcza Niepołomice	3–1	Lechia Gdańsk	Sosnowiec
13:30 GMT	Michał Nalepa 17 (OG)'; Hubert Tomalski 54'; Erik Čikoš 62'		Joseph Ceesay 3'	Stadium: Stadion Ludowy; Attendance: 0
Note: COVID-19 pandemic in Poland

== Statistics ==
			League		Polish Cup		Total	
No.	Pos.	Player	Apps	Goals	Apps	Goals	Apps	Goals
1	GK	Zlatan Alomerović	3	0	2	0	5	0
2	DF	Rafał Pietrzak	26	1	2	0	28	1
4	DF	Kristers Tobers	17	0	1	0	18	0
5	DF	Bartosz Kopacz	29	2	3	0	32	2
6	MF	Jarosław Kubicki	28	1	3	0	31	1
7	MF	Maciej Gajos	28	2	3	1	31	3
8	MF	Omran Haydary	18	1	1	0	19	1
9	FW	Łukasz Zwoliński	22	6	2	2	24	8
10	MF	Kacper Urbański	1	0	1	0	2	0
11	MF	Jaroslav Mihalík	9	1	2	0	11	1
12	GK	Dušan Kuciak	28	0	1	0	29	0
15	MF	Kenny Saief	22	0	1	0	23	0
17	FW	Mateusz Żukowski	16	0	3	0	19	0
18	FW	Jakub Arak	3	0	1	0	4	0
19	DF	Karol Fila	26	1	3	1	29	2
20	DF	Conrado	27	3	2	0	30	3
21	MF	Mateusz Sopoćko	4	0	1	0	5	0
22	MF	Joseph Ceesay	11	1	1	1	12	1
23	DF	Mario Maloča	15	1	0	0	15	1
25	DF	Michał Nalepa	16	3	3	0	19	3
28	FW	Flávio Paixão	30	12	3	0	33	12
31	MF	Žarko Udovičić	14	2	2	0	16	2
32	MF	Egy Maulana	7	0	0	0	7	0
36	MF	Tomasz Makowski	19	2	2	0	21	2
69	MF	Jan Biegański	13	0	0	0	13	0
72	DF	Filip Koperski	1	0	0	0	1	0
77	DF	Rafał Kobryń	1	0	1	0	2	0
78	DF	Mykola Musolitin	3	0	0	0	3	0
80	MF	Egzon Kryeziu	2	0	0	0	2	0
88	MF	Jakub Kałuziński	11	0	3	1	14	1

=== Goalscorers ===
Rank	Player	Goals
1	Flávio Paixão	12
2	Łukasz Zwoliński	8
3	Conrado	3
3	Maciej Gajos	3
3	Michał Nalepa	3
6	Karol Fila	2
6	Bartosz Kopacz	2
6	Tomasz Makowski	2
6	Žarko Udovičić	2
6	Own Goals	2
10	Joseph Ceesay	1
10	Omran Haydary	1
10	Jakub Kałuziński	1
10	Jarosław Kubicki	1
10	Mario Maloča	1
10	Jaroslav Mihalík	1
10	Rafał Pietrzak	1
