= Daniel Mikołajewski =

Daniel Mikołajewski may refer to:

- Daniel Mikołajewski (born 1999), Polish football defender
- Daniel Mikołajewski (born 2006), Polish football forward
