= Kristers Tobers =

Latvian footballer

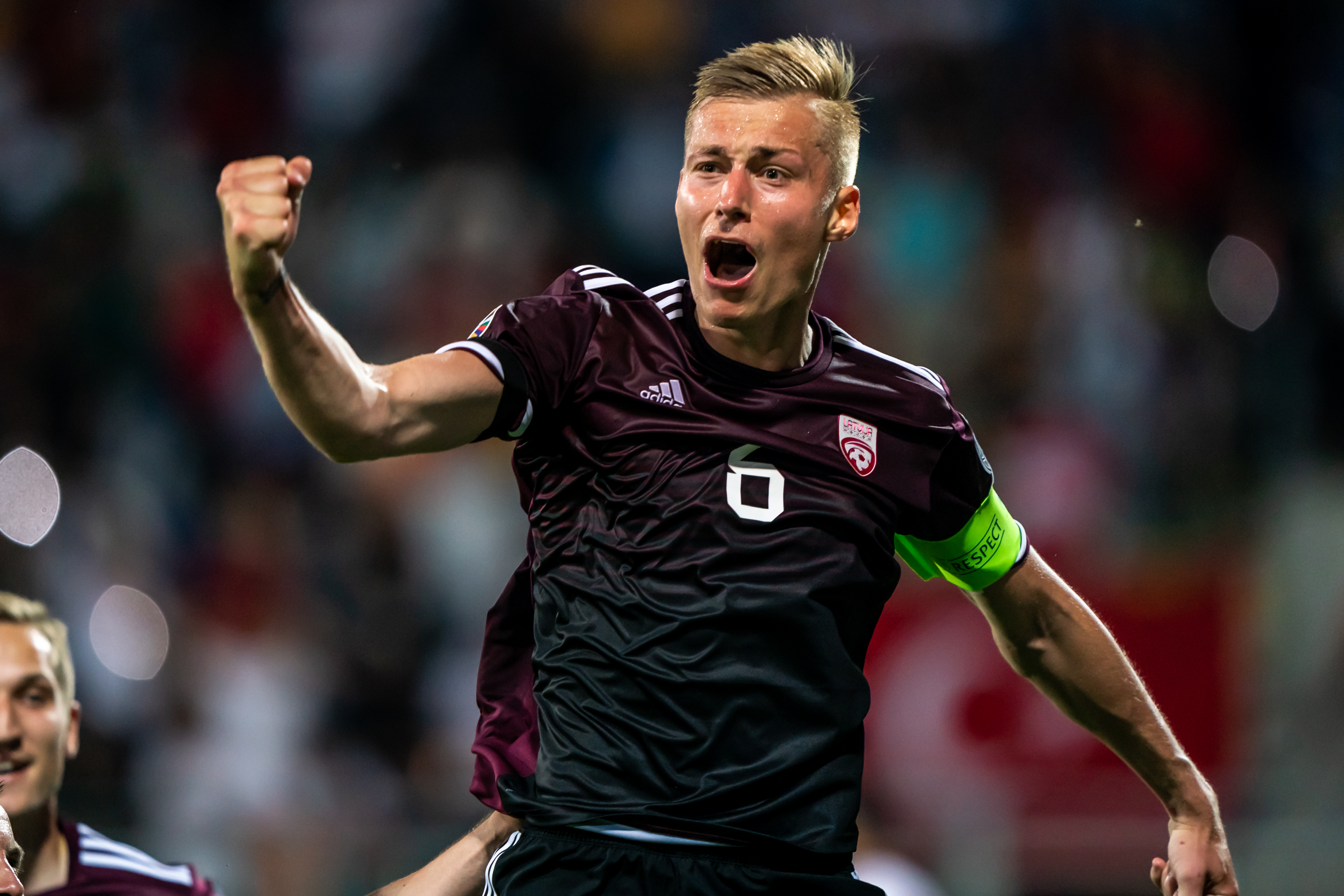

Personal information
- Date of birth: 13 December 2000 (age 25)
- Place of birth: Dobele, Latvia
- Height: 1.89 m (6 ft 2 in)
- Positions: Centre-back; defensive midfielder

Team information
- Current team: Aberdeen
- Number: 4

Youth career
- –2017: Liepāja

Senior career*
| Years | Team | Apps | (Gls) |
| 2018–2020 | Liepāja | 47 | (7) |
| 2020 | → Lechia Gdańsk (loan) | 6 | (0) |
| 2020–2023 | Lechia Gdańsk | 59 | (0) |
| 2023–2025 | Grasshoppers | 41 | (1) |
| 2025– | Aberdeen | 11 | (0) |

International career^{‡}
| 2016 | Latvia U17 | 11 | (4) |
| 2017–2018 | Latvia U19 | 10 | (2) |
| 2018 | Latvia U21 | 4 | (0) |
| 2019– | Latvia | 37 | (1) |
- * Club domestic league appearances and goals as of 20 May 2026 ‡ National team caps and goals as of 27 November 2024

Kristers Tobers (born 13 December 2000) is a Latvian professional footballer who plays as a centre-back or defensive midfielder for Scottish Premiership side Aberdeen and captains the Latvia national team.

== Career ==
=== Club career ===
In January 2020, he joined Lechia Gdańsk on a loan with an option of permanent transfer after the end of the season. On 7 February 2020 he made his Ekstraklasa debut against Śląsk Wrocław playing as a midfielder. After only seven games, Lechia triggered the option and Tobers signed a permanent deal until June 2023.

On 2 July 2023, he signed with Swiss record champion Grasshoppers, who play in the Swiss Super League. He signed a two-year contract with an option to extend. He quickly established himself as the lead in Grasshopper's defense, as he started in 32 games for the club.

On 24 August 2024, he finally scored his first goal for Grasshoppers, a skillful volley into the upper right corner of the goal, in a 3–1 victory over FC Sion.

On 8 January 2025, he transferred to Aberdeen in the Scottish Premiership, for a reported £700,000. He signed a three-and-a-half-year deal with "The Dons".

=== International career ===
Tobers made his international debut for Latvia on 21 March 2019, coming on as a substitute for Artūrs Karašausks in the 68th minute of the UEFA Euro 2020 qualifying match against North Macedonia, which finished as a 1–3 away loss.

Ahead of their UEFA Euro 2024 qualifying games in June 2023, he was chosen to captain the national team, by coach Dainis Kazakevičs. In his first match as captain, he scored his first international goal, the 2–2 equalizer, against Turkey.

== Career statistics ==
=== Club ===
As of 7 December 2024

Appearances and goals by club, season and competition
| Club | Season | League | | | National cup (Note: Includes Latvian Cup, Polish Cup, Swiss Cup) | | Continental | | Other | | Total | |
| Club | Season | Division | Apps | Goals | Apps | Goals | Apps | Goals | Apps | Goals | Apps | Goals |
|---|---|---|---|---|---|---|---|---|---|---|---|---|
| Liepāja | 2017 | Virslīga | — | | 2 | 0 | 2 (Note: Appearances in UEFA Youth League) | 0 | — | | 2 | 0 |
| Liepāja | 2018 | Virslīga | 23 | 2 | 3 | 0 | 2 (Note: Appearances in UEFA Europa League) | 0 | — | | 28 | 2 |
| Liepāja | 2019 | Virslīga | 24 | 3 | 2 | 0 | 4 | 0 | — | | 30 | 3 |
| Liepāja | Total | | 47 | 5 | 7 | 0 | 8 | 0 | — | | 60 | 5 |
| Lechia Gdańsk | 2019–20 | Ekstraklasa | 10 | 0 | 1 | 0 | — | | — | | 11 | 0 |
| Lechia Gdańsk | 2020–21 | Ekstraklasa | 17 | 0 | 1 | 0 | — | | — | | 18 | 0 |
| Lechia Gdańsk | 2021–22 | Ekstraklasa | 11 | 0 | — | | — | | — | | 11 | 0 |
| Lechia Gdańsk | 2022–23 | Ekstraklasa | 27 | 0 | 1 | 0 | 2 (Note: Appearances in UEFA Europa Conference League) | 0 | — | | 30 | 0 |
| Lechia Gdańsk | Total | | 65 | 0 | 3 | 0 | 2 | 0 | — | | 70 | 0 |
| Grasshoppers | 2023–24 | Swiss Super League | 29 | 0 | 1 | 0 | — | | 2 (Note: Appearances in the relegation play-off) | 0 | 32 | 0 |
| Grasshoppers | 2024–25 | Swiss Super League | 10 | 1 | 2 | 0 | — | | — | | 12 | 1 |
| Grasshoppers | Total | | 39 | 1 | 3 | 0 | 0 | 0 | 2 | 0 | 44 | 1 |
| Career Total | | | 146 | 5 | 13 | 0 | 10 | 0 | 2 | 0 | 171 | 5 |

=== International ===
As of match played 17 November 2024

Appearances and goals by national team and year
| National team | Year | Apps | Goals |
|---|---|---|---|
Latvia
| Latvia | 2019 | 6 | 0 |
| Latvia | 2020 | 3 | 0 |
| Latvia | 2021 | 3 | 0 |
| Latvia | 2022 | 8 | 0 |
| Latvia | 2023 | 9 | 1 |
| Latvia | 2024 | 8 | 0 |
| Total | | 37 | 1 |

Scores and results list Latvia's goal tally first, score column indicates score after each Tobers goal.

List of international goals scored by Kristers Tobers
| No. | Date | Venue | Opponent | Score | Result | Competition |
|---|---|---|---|---|---|---|
| 1. | 16 June 2023 | Skonto Stadium, Riga, Latvia | Turkey | 2–2 | 2–3 | UEFA Euro 2024 qualifying |

== Honours ==
Aberdeen

- Scottish Cup: 2024–25
