= Bartosz Kopacz =

Polish footballer

Personal information
- Full name: Bartosz Kopacz
- Date of birth: 21 May 1992 (age 34)
- Place of birth: Jastrzębie-Zdrój, Poland
- Height: 1.88 m (6 ft 2 in)
- Position: Defender

Youth career
- –2010: MOSiR Jastrzębie Zdrój

Senior career*
Years	Team	Apps	(Gls)
2010	GKS Jastrzębie	12	(2)
2010–2017	Górnik Zabrze	65	(8)
2011–2012	→ Ruch Radzionków (loan)	33	(3)
2012	→ Zawisza Bydgoszcz (loan)	13	(2)
2013–2015	→ Termalica Bruk-Bet (loan)	53	(1)
2017–2020	Zagłębie Lubin	92	(2)
2020–2022	Lechia Gdańsk	43	(2)
2022–2025	Zagłębie Lubin	80	(3)
2024	Zagłębie Lubin II	1	(0)
2025–2026	Bruk-Bet Termalica	34	(2)
- * Club domestic league appearances and goals as of 21:49, 25 May 2026 (UTC)

Bartosz Kopacz (born 21 May 1992) is a Polish professional footballer who plays as a defender.

== Club career ==
In July 2011, Kopacz was loaned to Ruch Radzionków on a one-year deal.

On 20 June 2017, he signed a contract with Zagłębie Lubin.

== Career statistics ==
As of match played 1 March 2026

Appearances and goals by club, season and competition
Club	Season	League			Polish Cup		Continental		Other		Total	
Club	Season	Division	Apps	Goals	Apps	Goals	Apps	Goals	Apps	Goals	Apps	Goals
GKS Jastrzębie	2009–10	II liga	12	2	—		—		—		12	2
Ruch Radzionków (loan)	2011–12	I liga	33	3	2	0	—		—		35	3
Zawisza Bydgoszcz (loan)	2012–13	I liga	13	2	1	0	—		—		14	2
Górnik Zabrze	2012–13	Ekstraklasa	6	1	—		—		—		6	1
Górnik Zabrze	2015–16	Ekstraklasa	28	4	1	0	—		—		29	4
Górnik Zabrze	2016–17	I liga	31	3	2	2	—		—		33	5
Górnik Zabrze	Total		65	8	3	2	—		—		68	10
Termalica Bruk-Bet (loan)	2013–14	I liga	22	1	0	0	—		—		22	1
Termalica Bruk-Bet (loan)	2014–15	I liga	31	0	1	0	—		—		32	0
Termalica Bruk-Bet (loan)	Total		53	1	1	0	—		—		54	1
Zagłębie Lubin	2017–18	Ekstraklasa	31	0	3	1	—		—		34	1
Zagłębie Lubin	2018–19	Ekstraklasa	26	1	1	0	—		—		27	1
Zagłębie Lubin	2019–20	Ekstraklasa	35	1	2	0	—		—		37	1
Zagłębie Lubin	Total		92	2	6	1	—		—		98	3
Lechia Gdańsk	2020–21	Ekstraklasa	29	2	3	0	—		—		32	2
Lechia Gdańsk	2021–22	Ekstraklasa	14	0	2	0	—		—		16	0
Lechia Gdańsk	Total		43	2	5	0	—		—		48	2
Zagłębie Lubin	2021–22	Ekstraklasa	15	0	0	0	—		—		15	0
Zagłębie Lubin	2022–23	Ekstraklasa	28	1	1	0	—		—		29	1
Zagłębie Lubin	2023–24	Ekstraklasa	31	2	1	0	—		—		32	2
Zagłębie Lubin	2024–25	Ekstraklasa	6	0	2	0	—		—		8	0
Zagłębie Lubin	Total		80	3	4	0	—		—		84	3
Zagłębie Lubin II	2024–25	II liga	1	0	0	0	—		—		15	0
Bruk-Bet Termalica	2024–25	I liga	15	2	—		—		—		15	2
Bruk-Bet Termalica	2025–26	Ekstraklasa	19	0	1	0	—		—		20	0
Bruk-Bet Termalica	Total		34	2	1	0	—		—		35	2
Career total			426	25	23	3	0	0	0	0	449	28
