= Rafał Kobryń =

Polish footballer (born 1999)

Personal information
- Full name: Rafał Kobryń
- Date of birth: 5 December 1999 (age 26)
- Place of birth: Gdańsk, Poland
- Height: 1.84 m (6 ft 0 in)
- Position: Defender

Team information
- Current team: Górnik Łęczna
- Number: 5

Youth career
- –2018: Lechia Gdańsk

Senior career*
Years	Team	Apps	(Gls)
2018–2022	Lechia Gdańsk	9	(0)
2019–2022	Lechia Gdańsk II	12	(2)
2018–2019	→ Chojniczanka (loan)	17	(0)
2021	→ Korona Kielce (loan)	16	(0)
2021–2022	→ Sandecja (loan)	23	(1)
2023	Cartusia Kartuzy	14	(0)
2023–2026	Olimpia Grudziądz	78	(1)
2026–	Górnik Łęczna	0	(0)
- * Club domestic league appearances and goals as of 16:10, 2 June 2026 (UTC)

Rafał Kobryń (born 5 December 1999) is a Polish professional footballer who plays as a defender for II liga club Górnik Łęczna.

== Career statistics ==
As of match played 30 May 2026

Appearances and goals by club, season and competition
Club	Season	League			Polish Cup		Continental		Other		Total	
Club	Season	Division	Apps	Goals	Apps	Goals	Apps	Goals	Apps	Goals	Apps	Goals
Lechia Gdańsk	2017–18	Ekstraklasa	1	0	0	0	—		—		1	0
Lechia Gdańsk	2019–20	Ekstraklasa	7	0	2	0	0	0	0	0	9	0
Lechia Gdańsk	2020–21	Ekstraklasa	1	0	1	0	—		—		2	0
Lechia Gdańsk	Total		9	0	3	0	0	0	0	0	12	0
Chojniczanka Chojnice (loan)	2018–19	I liga	17	0	0	0	—		—		17	0
Korona Kielce (loan)	2020–21	I liga	16	0	—		—		—		16	0
Sandecja Nowy Sącz (loan)	2021–22	I liga	23	1	0	0	—		—		23	1
Cartusia Kartuzy	2022–23	III liga, gr. II	14	0	—		—		—		14	0
Olimpia Grudziądz	2023–24	II liga	25	1	—		—		—		25	1
Olimpia Grudziądz	2024–25	II liga	32	0	4	0	—		2 (Note: Appearances in II liga relegation play-offs)	0	38	0
Olimpia Grudziądz	2025–26	II liga	19	0	1	0	—		0	0	20	0
Olimpia Grudziądz	Total		76	1	5	0	—		2	0	83	1
Górnik Łęczna	2026–27	II liga	0	0	0	0	—		—		0	0
Career total			155	2	8	0	0	0	2	0	165	2
