= Zlatan Alomerović =

Serbian footballer (born 1991)

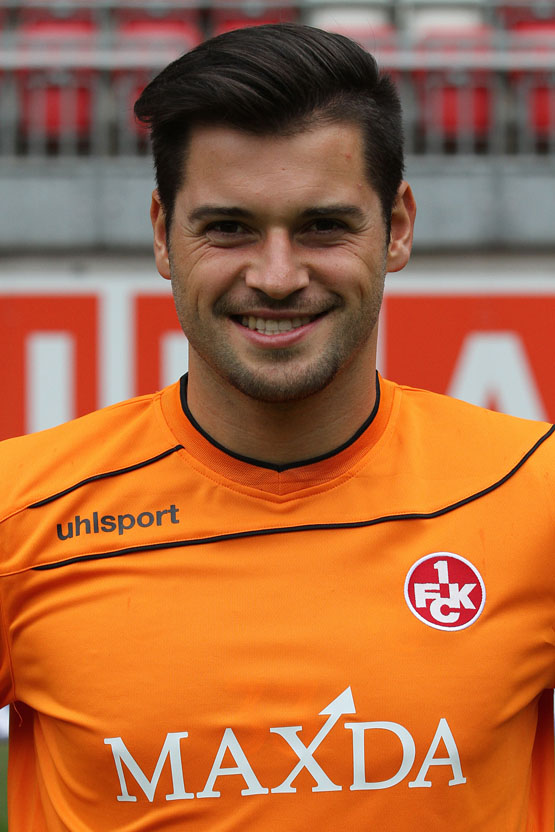
- Alomerović with 1. FC Kaiserslautern

Personal information
- Date of birth: 15 June 1991 (age 35)
- Place of birth: Prijepolje, SFR Yugoslavia
- Height: 1.87 m (6 ft 2 in)
- Position: Goalkeeper

Team information
- Current team: Zagłębie Lubin
- Number: 33

Youth career
- –2006: FSV Witten
- 2006–2010: Borussia Dortmund

Senior career*
Years	Team	Apps	(Gls)
2010–2015	Borussia Dortmund II	112	(0)
2012–2015	Borussia Dortmund	0	(0)
2015–2016	Kaiserslautern	1	(0)
2017–2018	Korona Kielce	21	(0)
2018–2022	Lechia Gdańsk	24	(0)
2018–2019	Lechia Gdańsk II	6	(0)
2022–2024	Jagiellonia Białystok	80	(0)
2024–2026	AEK Larnaca	57	(0)
2026–	Zagłębie Lubin	0	(0)
- * Club domestic league appearances and goals as of 11:31, 28 May 2026 (UTC)

Zlatan Alomerović (born 15 June 1991) is a Serbian professional footballer who plays as a goalkeeper for Ekstraklasa club Zagłębie Lubin.

== Early life ==
Alomerović was born in Prijepolje, in southwestern Serbia (still SFR Yugoslavia at the time). He arrived in Germany in 1999 at the age of eight with his family and grew up in Ruhr in North Rhine-Westphalia. He holds both a German passport and Serbian passport; he gained a German passport via the support of BVB.

== Club career ==
=== Borussia Dortmund ===
In 1999, following Alomerović's emigration to Germany from the former Yugoslavia, Alomerović was enrolled into the academy of TuS Heven and then he was enrolled for one year at the academy of SV Bommern 05 and the academy of SV Herbede before being enrolled at the academy of FSV Witten until the end of the 2005–06 season. In the 2006–07 season, Alomerović was enrolled into the Borussia Dortmund academy.

In the 2010–11 season, Alomerović graduated from the BVB academy to the Borussia Dortmund II where he played in the Regionalliga. On 19 March 2011, Alomerović played his only game for Borussia Dortmund II in the 2010–11 season in a Borussia Dortmund II 2–2 draw with the second team of Fortuna Düsseldorf. In the 2011–12 season, the new Borussia Dortmund II manager David Wagner made some system changes and changes of goalkeepers after every second game; then Alomerović played his first match under David Wagner in Borussia Dortmund II's 4–0 away win over the second team of Schalke 04.

In the 2012–13 season, on 21 July 2012 Alomerović played his first match of the 2012–13 3. Liga season for Borussia Dortmund II and made his professional football debut in the German 3. Liga against VfL Osnabrück. On 18 May 2013, Alomerović played his second match of the 2012–13 season for Borussia Dortmund II in a 1–0 away win over VfB Stuttgart II and at the end of the 2012–13 season, Alomerović was inducted into the Borussia Dortmund first team for the 2013–14 Bundesliga season and Alomerović signed a one-year contract extension with Borussia Dortmund until 30 June 2014.

=== Korona Kielce ===
On 8 July 2017, he signed a contract with Ekstraklasa side Korona Kielce.

=== AEK Larnaca ===
On 1 June 2024, Alomerović was announced at Cypriot club AEK Larnaca on a two-year deal. He left Larnaca at the end of his contract.

=== Zagłębie Lubin ===
On 29 May 2026, Alomerović returned to Poland to join Ekstraklasa club Zagłębie Lubin on a two-year deal.

== Career statistics ==
As of match played 6 May 2026

Appearances and goals by club, season and competition
Club	Season	League			National cup (Note: Includes Polish Cup, Cypriot Cup)		Continental		Other		Total	
Club	Season	Division	Apps	Goals	Apps	Goals	Apps	Goals	Apps	Goals	Apps	Goals
Borussia Dortmund II	2010–11	Regionalliga West	1	0	—		—		—		1	0
Borussia Dortmund II	2011–12	Regionalliga West	15	0	—		—		—		15	0
Borussia Dortmund II	2012–13	3. Liga	33	0	—		—		—		33	0
Borussia Dortmund II	2013–14	3. Liga	31	0	—		—		—		31	0
Borussia Dortmund II	2014–15	3. Liga	32	0	—		—		—		32	0
Borussia Dortmund II	Total		112	0	—		—		—		112	0
Borussia Dortmund	2012–13	Bundesliga	0	0	0	0	0	0	0	0	0	0
Borussia Dortmund	2013–14	Bundesliga	0	0	0	0	0	0	0	0	0	0
Borussia Dortmund	2014–15	Bundesliga	0	0	0	0	0	0	0	0	0	0
Borussia Dortmund	Total		0	0	0	0	0	0	0	0	0	0
Kaiserslautern	2015–16	2. Bundesliga	1	0	0	0	—		—		1	0
Kaiserslautern II	2015–16	Regionalliga Südwest	1	0	—		—		—		1	0
Korona Kielce	2017–18	Ekstraklasa	21	0	4	0	—		—		25	0
Lechia Gdańsk	2018–19	Ekstraklasa	9	0	4	0	—		—		13	0
Lechia Gdańsk	2019–20	Ekstraklasa	7	0	6	0	0	0	0	0	13	0
Lechia Gdańsk	2020–21	Ekstraklasa	2	0	2	0	—		—		4	0
Lechia Gdańsk	2021–22	Ekstraklasa	6	0	1	0	—		—		7	0
Lechia Gdańsk	Total		24	0	13	0	0	0	0	0	37	0
Jagiellonia Białystok	2021–22	Ekstraklasa	14	0	—		—		—		14	0
Jagiellonia Białystok	2022–23	Ekstraklasa	32	0	0	0	—		—		32	0
Jagiellonia Białystok	2023–24	Ekstraklasa	34	0	0	0	—		—		34	0
Jagiellonia Białystok	Total		80	0	0	0	—		—		80	0
AEK Larnaca	2024–25	Cypriot First Division	4	0	4	0	2 (Note: Appearances in UEFA Conference League)	0	—		10	0
AEK Larnaca	2025–26	Cypriot First Division	30	0	0	0	16 (Note: Eight appearances in UEFA Europa League, eight appearances in UEFA Conference League)	0	0	0	46	0
AEK Larnaca	Total		34	0	4	0	18	0	0	0	56	0
Zagłębie Lubin	2026–27	Ekstraklasa	0	0	0	0	—		—		0	0
Career total			273	0	21	0	18	0	0	0	312	0

== Honours ==
Borussia Dortmund

- Regionalliga West: 2011–12

Borussia Dortmund

- DFL-Supercup: 2014

Lechia Gdańsk

- Polish Cup: 2018–19
- Polish Super Cup: 2019

Jagiellonia Białystok

- Ekstraklasa: 2023–24

AEK Larnaca

- Cypriot Cup: 2024–25

Individual

- Polish Union of Footballers' Ekstraklasa Team of the Season: 2023–24
