= Jarosław Kubicki =

Polish footballer

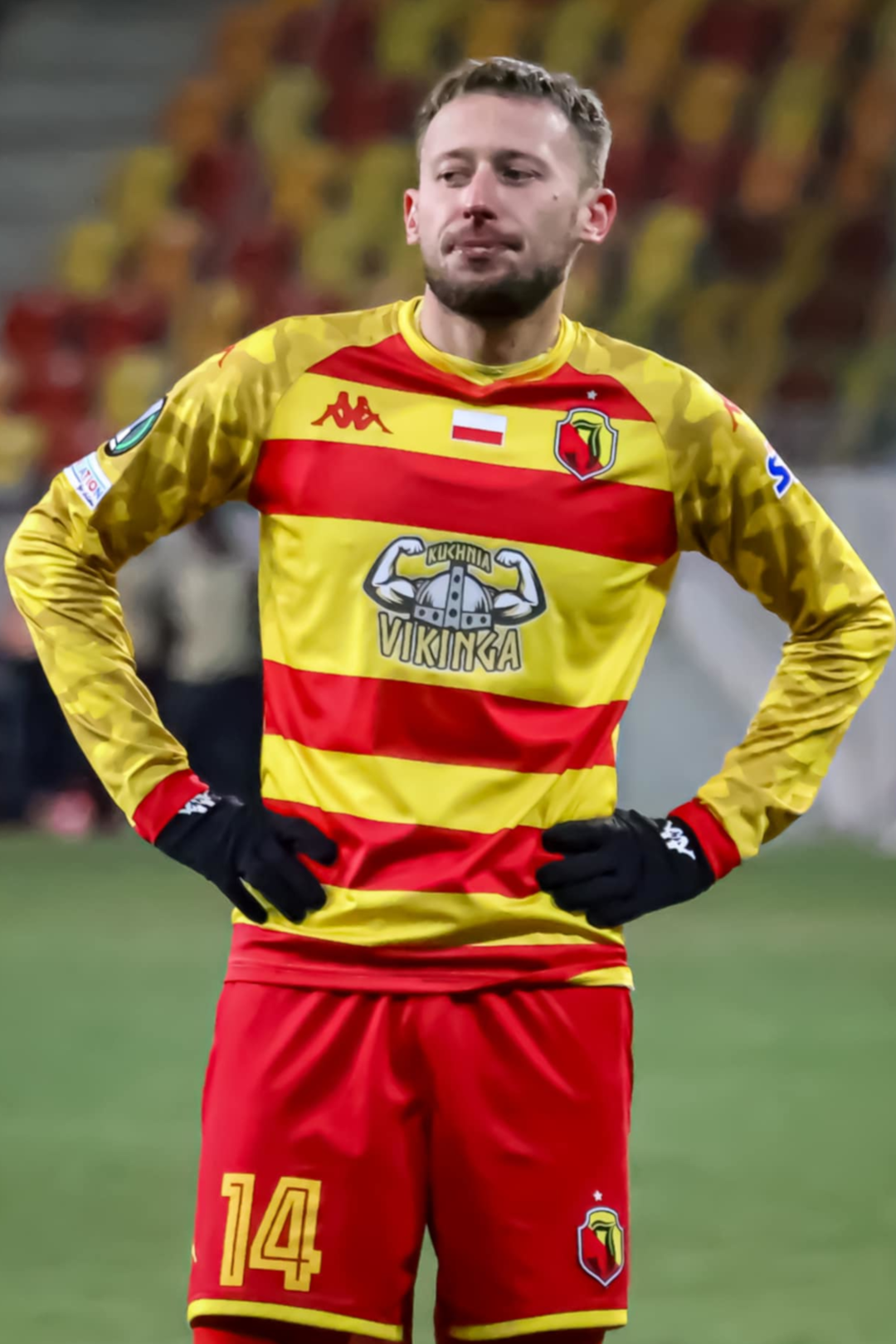
- Kubicki with Jagiellonia Białystok in 2025

Personal information
- Full name: Jarosław Kubicki
- Date of birth: 7 August 1995 (age 31)
- Place of birth: Lubin, Poland
- Height: 1.80 m (5 ft 11 in)
- Position: Midfielder

Team information
- Current team: Górnik Zabrze
- Number: 14

Youth career
- –2013: Zagłębie Lubin

Senior career*
Years	Team	Apps	(Gls)
2013–2014	Zagłębie Lubin II	37	(2)
2014–2018	Zagłębie Lubin	110	(6)
2018–2023	Lechia Gdańsk	151	(9)
2023–2025	Jagiellonia Białystok	61	(6)
2024	Jagiellonia Białystok II	1	(0)
2025–	Górnik Zabrze	36	(4)

International career
2015–2016	Poland U20	3	(0)
2016–2017	Poland U21	6	(0)
- * Club domestic league appearances and goals as of 00:19, 11 October 2026 (UTC)

Jarosław Kubicki (born 7 August 1995) is a Polish professional footballer who plays as a midfielder for Ekstraklasa club Górnik Zabrze.

== Career ==
=== Youth career ===
Kubicki started playing in Zagłębie Lubin, where he spent his entire junior career.

=== Zagłębie Lubin ===
On 8 August 2013, he debuted in III liga with Zagłębie Lubin II in a 5–0 victory over Polonia Trzebnica, during which he came off the bench in the 74th minute. Eight days later, he made his first starting line-up in another 5–0 win over Prochowiczanka Prochowice. On 26 October 2013, he scored his first goal for Zagłębie II in a 3–2 win against Lechia Dzierżoniów.

Kubicki made his Ekstraklasa debut on 31 May 2014, starting in a 2–0 away loss to Podbeskidzie Bielsko-Biała. He scored his first goal for Zagłębie in a 4–2 win against Cracovia on 18 September 2015. During the 2015–16 season, he appeared in 28 matches in Ekstraklasa and three Polish Cup games, scoring four goals.

=== Lechia Gdańsk ===
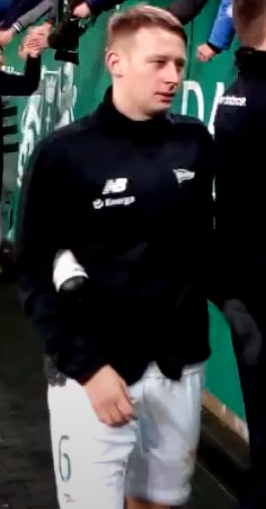
Kubicki in 2018 with Lechia Gdańsk

In June 2018, he was transferred to Lechia Gdańsk on a three-year deal on a free transfer. His first Lechia appearance came on 20 July 2018 in a 1–0 win over Jagiellonia Białystok. He scored his first goal for Lechia in a 4–1 victory over Zagłębie Sosnowiec on 6 October 2018.

On 28 November 2019, he sustained a shoulder dislocation during a training and needed to have surgery, which was underwent the following day. On 20 April 2019, he was sent off the pitch after receiving two yellow cards in a 0–2 loss to Piast Gliwice.

Across the 2018–19 season, he appeared in 41 matches in all competitions (35 in Ekstraklasa and 6 in Polish Cup) and scored four goals. In October 2020, he extended his contract for another two years. On 25 January 2023, the prolongation of his contract for another two years was announced.

=== Jagiellonia Białystok ===
On 5 July 2023, his transfer to Jagiellonia Białystok was announced. He was transferred on a two-year deal as a free transfer. In Jagiellonia, he was assigned squad number 14.

He debuted for Jagiellonia coming off the bench in the 64th minute in a 0–3 defeat to Raków Częstochowa on 22 July 2023. He scored his first goal for the club in a 6–0 win over ŁKS Łódź on 30 March 2024. On 3 November 2023, during a 4–0 victory over Stal Mielec, he sustained an ankle injury and was operated on a day later. He returned to play on 11 February 2024, in a 1–3 away win against Widzew Łódź. At the end of the 2023–24 season, Jagiellonia were crowned champions for the first time in club's history.

On 27 July 2024, for the first time in his senior career, he scored two goals in one match. It happened in a 2–3 away win over Radomiak Radom, with both goals being scored from outside the penalty area.

=== Górnik Zabrze ===
On 28 May 2025, Kubicki moved to Ekstraklasa club Górnik Zabrze on a free transfer, signing a deal until 30 June 2028.

== Career statistics ==
As of match played 16 July 2026

Appearances and goals by club, season and competition
Club	Season	League			Polish Cup		Europe		Other		Total	
Club	Season	Division	Apps	Goals	Apps	Goals	Apps	Goals	Apps	Goals	Apps	Goals
Zagłębie Lubin II	2013–14	III liga, gr. E	29	2	—		—		—		29	2
Zagłębie Lubin II	2014–15	III liga, gr. E	8	0	1	0	—		—		9	0
Zagłębie Lubin II	Total		37	2	1	0	—		—		38	2
Zagłębie Lubin	2013–14	Ekstraklasa	2	0	—		—		—		2	0
Zagłębie Lubin	2014–15	I liga	20	0	1	0	—		—		21	0
Zagłębie Lubin	2015–16	Ekstraklasa	28	4	3	0	—		—		31	4
Zagłębie Lubin	2016–17	Ekstraklasa	34	1	0	0	6 (Note: Appearances in UEFA Europa League)	0	—		40	1
Zagłębie Lubin	2017–18	Ekstraklasa	26	1	4	1	—		—		30	2
Zagłębie Lubin	Total		110	6	8	1	6	0	—		124	7
Lechia Gdańsk	2018–19	Ekstraklasa	35	4	6	0	—		—		41	4
Lechia Gdańsk	2019–20	Ekstraklasa	27	0	5	0	1	0	1 (Note: Appearance in Polish Super Cup)	1	34	1
Lechia Gdańsk	2020–21	Ekstraklasa	28	1	3	0	—		—		31	1
Lechia Gdańsk	2021–22	Ekstraklasa	30	2	2	0	—		—		32	2
Lechia Gdańsk	2022–23	Ekstraklasa	31	2	2	0	4 (Note: Appearances in UEFA Europa Conference League)	0	—		37	2
Lechia Gdańsk	Total		151	9	18	0	5	0	1	1	175	10
Jagiellonia Białystok	2023–24	Ekstraklasa	27	1	3	0	—		—		30	1
Jagiellonia Białystok	2024–25	Ekstraklasa	34	5	2	1	18 (Note: Four appearances in UEFA Champions League, two appearances in UEFA Europa League, twelve appearances in UEFA Conference League)	0	1	0	55	6
Jagiellonia Białystok	Total		61	6	5	1	18	0	1	0	85	7
Jagiellonia II	2023–24	III liga, gr. I	1	0	—		—		—		1	0
Górnik Zabrze	2025–26	Ekstraklasa	29	3	5	0	—		—		34	3
Górnik Zabrze	2026–27	Ekstraklasa	0	0	0	0	0	0	1	0	1	0
Górnik Zabrze	Total		29	3	5	0	0	0	1	1	35	3
Career total			389	26	37	2	29	0	3	1	458	28

== Honours ==
Zagłębie Lubin

- I liga: 2014–15

Lechia Gdańsk

- Polish Cup: 2018–19
- Polish Super Cup: 2019

Jagiellonia Białystok

- Ekstraklasa: 2023–24
- Polish Super Cup: 2024

Górnik Zabrze

- Polish Cup: 2025–26
