= Jakub Kałuziński =

Polish footballer (born 2002)

Personal information
- Full name: Jakub Kałuziński
- Date of birth: 31 October 2002 (age 24)
- Place of birth: Gdańsk, Poland
- Height: 1.84 m (6 ft 0 in)
- Position: Midfielder

Team information
- Current team: İstanbul Başakşehir
- Number: 18

Youth career
- 2013–2015: AP Lechia Gdańsk
- 2015–2020: Lechia Gdańsk

Senior career*
Years	Team	Apps	(Gls)
2019–2021	Lechia Gdańsk II	9	(3)
2020–2023	Lechia Gdańsk	56	(1)
2023–2025	Antalyaspor	70	(0)
2025–	İstanbul Başakşehir	19	(0)

International career
2020	Poland U19	1	(0)
2021–2022	Poland U20	5	(0)
2022–2025	Poland U21	21	(5)
2024	Poland	1	(0)
- * Club domestic league appearances and goals as of 09:26, 12 November 2026 (UTC)

Jakub Kałuziński (born 31 October 2002) is a Polish professional footballer who plays as a midfielder for Süper Lig club İstanbul Başakşehir.

== Club career ==
Kałuziński signed his first professional contract with Lechia Gdańsk on 20 June 2020 until 2023. The following day, he made his senior debut in a 1–0 away win over Pogoń Szczecin. Later that year, on 19 August, he scored his first goal in a 4–0 away win over Stal Stalowa Wola in the Polish Cup.

In July 2023, Kałuziński joined Süper Lig club Antalyaspor by signing a contract until 2026, with an option for an additional year.

On 12 September 2025, Kałuziński moved to İstanbul Başakşehir on a four-year deal for an undisclosed fee.

== International career ==
On 3 June 2024, Kałuziński was included to the preliminary squad of the senior team ahead of the UEFA Euro 2024, but did not make the final squad. He debuted on 7 June 2024 in a friendly match against Ukraine at the Stadion Narodowy, coming as a substitute to Kacper Urbański in the 61st minute as Poland won 3–1.

== Career statistics ==
=== Club ===
As of match played 7 November 2026

Appearances and goals by club, season and competition
Club	Season	League			National cup (Note: Includes Polish Cup and Turkish Cup)		Europe		Other		Total	
Club	Season	Division	Apps	Goals	Apps	Goals	Apps	Goals	Apps	Goals	Apps	Goals
Lechia Gdańsk II	2019–20	IV liga Pomerania	1	0	—		—		—		1	0
Lechia Gdańsk II	2020–21	IV liga Pomerania	5	1	—		—		—		5	1
Lechia Gdańsk II	2021–22	IV liga Pomerania	3	2	—		—		—		3	2
Lechia Gdańsk II	Total		9	3	—		—		—		9	3
Lechia Gdańsk	2019–20	Ekstraklasa	3	0	0	0	—		—		3	0
Lechia Gdańsk	2020–21	Ekstraklasa	11	0	3	1	—		—		14	1
Lechia Gdańsk	2021–22	Ekstraklasa	18	1	2	0	—		—		20	1
Lechia Gdańsk	2022–23	Ekstraklasa	24	0	2	1	4 (Note: Appearances in UEFA Europa Conference League)	0	—		30	1
Lechia Gdańsk	Total		56	1	7	2	4	0	—		67	3
Antalyaspor	2023–24	Süper Lig	31	0	4	0	—		—		35	0
Antalyaspor	2024–25	Süper Lig	35	0	5	0	—		—		40	0
Antalyaspor	2025–26	Süper Lig	4	0	—		—		—		4	0
Antalyaspor	Total		70	0	9	0	—		—		79	0
İstanbul Başakşehir	2025–26	Süper Lig	9	0	3	0	—		—		12	0
İstanbul Başakşehir	2026–27	Süper Lig	10	0	0	0	—		—		10	0
İstanbul Başakşehir	Total		19	0	3	0	—		—		22	0
Career total			154	4	19	2	4	0	0	0	178	6

=== International ===
As of match played 7 June 2024

Appearances and goals by national team and year
National team	Year	Apps	Goals
Poland	2024	1	0
Total		1	0
