= Paweł Żuk (footballer, born 2001) =

Polish association football player

Personal information
- Full name: Paweł Andrzej Żuk
- Date of birth: 29 January 2001 (age 25)
- Place of birth: Gdańsk, Poland
- Height: 1.77 m (5 ft 10 in)
- Positions: Right-back; right midfielder

Team information
- Current team: Hanley Town

Youth career
- –2015: Oldham Athletic
- 2015–2019: Everton

Senior career*
Years	Team	Apps	(Gls)
2019–2020	Lechia Gdańsk	2	(0)
2019–2020	Lechia Gdańsk II	16	(1)
2020	Wisła Płock	3	(0)
2022	Ruch Chorzów	16	(0)
2022–2023	Barrow	1	(0)
2022	→ Glossop North End (loan)	3	(0)
2023	→ Lancaster City (loan)	14	(0)
2023	FC United of Manchester	5	(0)
2023–2024	Stalybridge Celtic		
2024–	Hanley Town		

International career
2015–2016	Poland U15	2	(0)
2017–2018	Poland U17	11	(3)
2019	Poland U18	3	(0)
- * Club domestic league appearances and goals as of 23:12, 31 October 2024

Paweł Andzrej Żuk (born 29 January 2001) is a Polish professional footballer who plays as a right-back or a right midfielder for Northern Premier League Division One West club Hanley Town.

== Early life ==
Żuk was born in Gdańsk, before moving to England with his family at the age of four.

== Club career ==
=== Early years ===
He started his early footballing years with Oldham Athletic before moving to Everton at the age of 14 for £400k. When he was 15 he received the award for the best footballer in the academy for the under-15's. In the 2018–19 season Żuk made 32 appearances and scored 2 goals for the under-18's team.

=== Lechia Gdańsk ===
In 2019, Żuk moved back to the city of his birth to play for Lechia Gdańsk, signing a three-year contract and being given the number 30 shirt. He made his Lechia Gdańsk II debut in the Tricity Derby, with Arka Gdynia winning the game 2–0. In September 2019, Żuk played all 90 minutes as Lechia II beat Stolem Gniewino 11–0. Żuk made his first senior appearance on 7 February 2020 coming on as a substitute against Śląsk Wrocław in a 2–2 draw. In total Żuk made only 2 appearances for Lechia during his first professional season, with the club deciding the player was surplus to requirements at that time and would be allowed to leave during the summer.

=== Wisła Płock ===
On 21 July 2020, he signed a two-year contract with Wisła Płock for a nominal fee. After starting Wisła's first three games of the season, Żuk found himself dropped to the substitutes bench, before being dropped from the matchday squad altogether. After only 5 months and 4 games with Wisła, he left the club by mutual consent on 11 December 2020.

=== Radomiak Radom ===
After 10 months without a club, and more than a year since his last game, Żuk was announced to have joined newly promoted Ekstraklasa team Radomiak Radom on trial, with the possibility of the player joining the reserve squad if the trial were to be successful. After not impressing during his trial, Żuk left Radomiak without being offered a contract.

=== Ruch Chorzów ===
On 26 January 2022, after spending two weeks on trial with Polish II liga side Ruch Chorzów, he signed a half-year contract with a one-year extension option with the club. At the end of the season, Żuk's contract was not extended, and he departed the club.

=== Barrow ===
On 22 August 2022, Żuk returned to England, signing a one-year contract with League Two club Barrow.

On 4 November 2022, Źuk joined Northern Premier League Division One West club Glossop North End on an initial one-month loan deal. On 10 February 2023, he joined Lancaster City on a one-month loan deal. He was released by Barrow at the end of his one-year deal, being invited back for pre-season however.

=== Non-League ===
In July 2023, Zuk signed for Northern Premier League club FC United of Manchester. He joined Stalybridge Celtic in November 2023.

== International career ==
Żuk made his international debut for Poland U15 against the Republic of Ireland in a 2–1 away win. He made one more appearance for the under-15's, playing twice for the age group in total. Żuk also played for Poland U17, playing 11 times in total and scoring thrice. His first two goals came in the 8–0 win over San Marino. Żuk made his Poland U18 debut in an international friendly tournament held in La Manga, Spain. He played in all three of Poland's games as they finished 3rd in their group.

== Career statistics ==
As of match played 4 November 2023

Appearances and goals by club, season and competition
Club	Season	League			National cup (Note: Includes Polish Cup, FA Cup)		League cup		Other		Total	
Club	Season	Division	Apps	Goals	Apps	Goals	Apps	Goals	Apps	Goals	Apps	Goals
Lechia Gdańsk	2019–20	Ekstraklasa	2	0	0	0	—		—		2	0
Lechia Gdańsk II	2019–20	IV liga Pomerania	16	1	—		—		—		16	1
Wisła Płock	2020–21	Ekstraklasa	3	0	1	0	—		—		4	0
Ruch Chorzów	2021–22	II liga	14	0	0	0	—		2 (Note: Appearances in II liga promotion play-offs)	0	16	0
Barrow	2022–23	League Two	1	0	0	0	0	0	2 (Note: Appearances in the Football League Trophy)	0	3	0
Glossop North End (loan)	2022–23	Northern Premier League Division One West	3	0	0	0	0	0	1 (Note: Appearances in the Manchester Senior Cup)	0	4	0
Lancaster City F.C. (loan)	2022–23	Northern Premier League Premier Division	14	0	0	0	—		0	0	14	0
FC United of Manchester	2023–24	Northern Premier League Premier Division	5	0	1	0	—		1 (Note: Appearance(s) in FA Trophy)	0	7	0
Career total			60	1	2	0	0	0	4	0	66	1
