= Patryk Lipski =

Polish footballer

Personal information
- Full name: Patryk Daniel Lipski
- Date of birth: 12 June 1994 (age 32)
- Place of birth: Szczecin, Poland
- Height: 1.86 m (6 ft 1 in)
- Position: Midfielder

Team information
- Current team: Fujairah

Youth career
- –2011: Salos Szczecin
- 2012–2013: Ruch Chorzów

Senior career*
Years	Team	Apps	(Gls)
2013–2017	Ruch Chorzów	66	(9)
2017–2020	Lechia Gdańsk	59	(7)
2020–2022	Piast Gliwice	38	(1)
2022–2023	Widzew Łódź	21	(2)
2023–2025	Ethnikos Achna	56	(6)
2025–2026	Krasava Ypsonas	22	(2)
2026–	Fujairah	0	(0)

International career
2015–2017	Poland U21	15	(1)
- * Club domestic league appearances and goals as of 10:55, 1 June 2026 (UTC)

Patryk Daniel Lipski (born 12 June 1994) is a Polish professional footballer who plays as a midfielder for UAE First Division League club Fujairah.

== Career ==
Lipski started his career with Ruch Chorzów. On 12 August 2017, Lipski agreed a deal to join Lechia Gdańsk. In August 2020, he became a player of Piast Gliwice, and he left the club by mutual consent at the end of February 2022.

Shortly after, on 3 March 2022, Lipski joined I liga club Widzew Łódź on a year-and-a-half contract.

On 3 July 2023, Lipski moved abroad for the first time in his career to join Cypriot First Division side Ethnikos Achna on a one-year deal, which was extended for a further year on 9 May 2024. The following day, he scored his fourth league goal of the season in a 6–3 loss against Doxa Katokopias. He ended the season with five goals and ten assists in 41 appearances across all competitions.

On 26 August 2025, Lipski signed with Cypriot top-flight newcomers Krasava Ypsonas on a one-year contract. He announced his departure from the club on 14 July 2026.

On 19 July 2026, Lipski signed with Fujairah in the United Arab Emirates.

== Career statistics ==
As of match played 17 May 2026

Appearances and goals by club, season and competition
Club	Season	League			National cup (Note: Includes Polish Cup, Cypriot Cup)		Continental		Other		Total	
Club	Season	Division	Apps	Goals	Apps	Goals	Apps	Goals	Apps	Goals	Apps	Goals
Ruch Chorzów	2014–15	Ekstraklasa	1	0	0	0	—		—		1	0
Ruch Chorzów	2015–16	Ekstraklasa	36	4	2	1	—		—		38	5
Ruch Chorzów	2016–17	Ekstraklasa	29	5	1	0	—		—		30	5
Ruch Chorzów	Total		66	9	3	1	—		—		69	10
Lechia Gdańsk	2017–18	Ekstraklasa	21	1	0	0	—		—		21	1
Lechia Gdańsk	2018–19	Ekstraklasa	21	6	3	0	—		—		24	6
Lechia Gdańsk	2019–20	Ekstraklasa	17	0	5	1	2 (Note: Appearances in UEFA Europa League)	1	0	0	24	2
Lechia Gdańsk	Total		59	7	8	1	2	1	0	0	69	9
Piast Gliwice	2020–21	Ekstraklasa	25	1	5	0	3	1	—		33	2
Piast Gliwice	2021–22	Ekstraklasa	13	0	2	0	—		—		15	0
Piast Gliwice	Total		38	1	7	0	3	1	—		48	2
Widzew Łódź	2021–22	I liga	11	0	—		—		—		11	0
Widzew Łódź	2022–23	Ekstraklasa	10	2	1	0	—		—		11	2
Widzew Łódź	Total		21	2	1	0	—		—		22	2
Ethnikos Achna	2023–24	Cypriot First Division	39	4	2	1	—		—		41	5
Ethnikos Achna	2024–25	Cypriot First Division	17	2	1	0	—		—		18	2
Ethnikos Achna	Total		56	6	3	1	—		—		59	7
Krasava Ypsonas	2025–26	Cypriot First Division	22	2	1	0	—		—		23	2
Fujairah	2026–27	UAE First Division League	0	0	0	0	—		—		0	0
Career total			262	27	23	3	5	2	0	0	290	32

== Honours ==
Lechia Gdańsk

- Polish Cup: 2018–19
- Polish Super Cup: 2019
