= Rafael Lopes =

Portuguese footballer (born 1991)

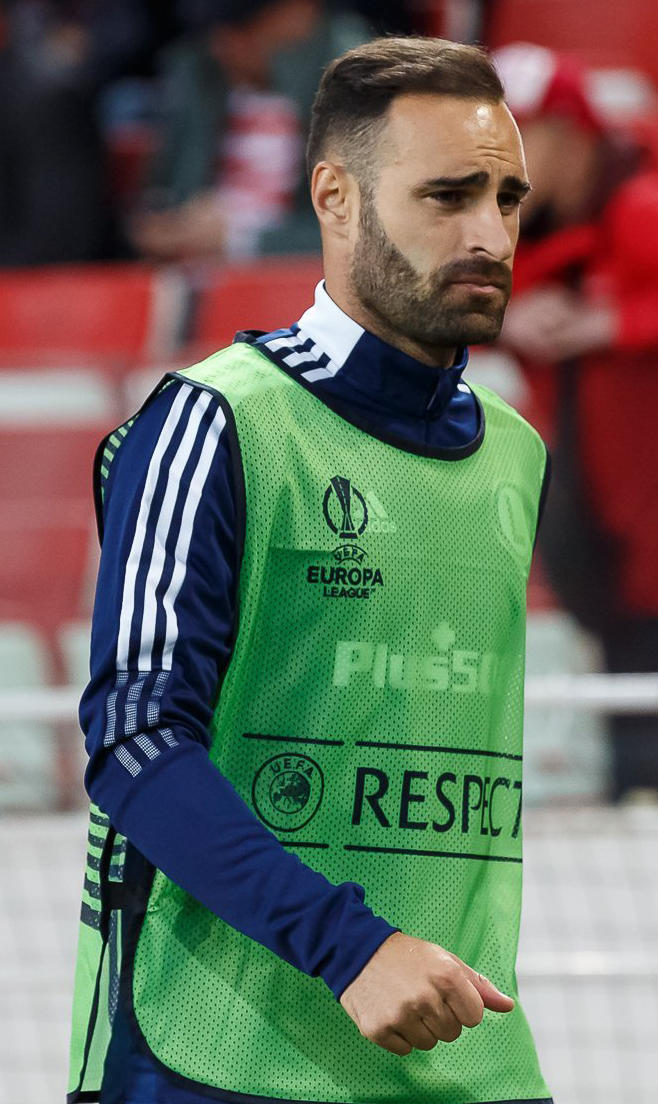
- Lopes with Legia Warsaw in 2021

Personal information
- Full name: Rafael Guimarães Lopes
- Date of birth: 28 July 1991 (age 35)
- Place of birth: Esposende, Portugal
- Height: 1.85 m (6 ft 1 in)
- Position: Forward

Team information
- Current team: Anorthosis
- Number: 21

Youth career
- 2002–2007: Esposende
- 2007–2010: Varzim

Senior career*
Years	Team	Apps	(Gls)
2010–2011	Varzim	27	(10)
2011–2012	Vitória Setúbal	23	(3)
2012–2013	Moreirense	21	(0)
2013–2014	Penafiel	23	(9)
2014–2016	Académica	66	(7)
2016–2017	Chaves	29	(5)
2017–2018	Omonia	25	(7)
2018–2019	Boavista	25	(2)
2019–2020	Cracovia	35	(12)
2020–2022	Legia Warsaw	47	(9)
2022–2024	AEK Larnaca	61	(13)
2024–2025	Anorthosis	23	(12)
2025–2026	Wieczysta Kraków	33	(8)
2026–	Anorthosis	16	(6)

International career
2010–2011	Portugal U20	11	(1)
Medal record
Men's football
Representing Portugal
FIFA U-20 World Cup
Runner-up	2011 Colombia
- * Club domestic league appearances and goals as of 20:57, 25 October 2026 (UTC)

Rafael Guimarães Lopes CvIH (born 28 July 1991) is a Portuguese professional footballer who plays as a forward for Cypriot First Division club Anorthosis.

== Club career ==
=== Portugal ===
Born in Esposende, Braga District, Lopes started his senior career with Varzim S.C. in the Segunda Liga. In the summer of 2011 he moved to the Primeira Liga after joining Vitória FC, making his debut in the competition on 9 September when he came on as a late substitute in a 3–0 away loss against FC Porto. He scored his first goal for his new club on 18 December, helping to a 1–1 draw at C.D. Nacional.

In the 2013 off-season, after failing to find the net for Moreirense F.C. in 21 bench appearances and suffering top-flight relegation, Lopes returned to division two with F.C. Penafiel. He moved back to the top tier the following winter transfer window, signing for Académica de Coimbra until June 2016.

On 20 June 2016, after another relegation, Lopes stayed in the league on a one-year contract at G.D. Chaves. Two of his league goals during the campaign came in consecutive 2–2 draws in early January 2017, against Rio Ave F.C. and Sporting CP.

=== Omonia ===
On 10 July 2017, Lopes agreed to a two-year deal with AC Omonia from the Cypriot First Division. He made his debut on 10 September in the season opener, a 2–1 home win against Ethnikos Achna FC.

=== Return to Portugal and Poland ===
Lopes returned to his homeland in July 2018, joining Boavista F.C. on a one-year contract. He scored just three times during his spell at the Estádio do Bessa, once in the fourth round of the Taça de Portugal to help dispose of hosts S.C. Espinho 4–0.

On 29 May 2019, Lopes moved to the Ekstraklasa by signing a two-year deal with KS Cracovia. He netted a career-best 12 goals in his only season, also helping the club to win its first-ever Polish Cup after beating Lechia Gdańsk 3–2 in extra time.

Lopes joined Legia Warsaw for 2020–21. He contributed four goals during that campaign for the champions.

=== Later career ===
On 10 July 2022, Lopes signed for two seasons with AEK Larnaca FC from Cyprus. In summer 2024, the 33-year-old joined fellow top-division Anorthosis Famagusta FC on a contract of the same duration.

== International career ==
Lopes was part of the Portugal squad at the 2011 FIFA U-20 World Cup. He played four matches in the tournament held in Colombia, in an eventual runner-up finish.

== Honours ==
Cracovia

- Polish Cup: 2019–20

Legia Warsaw

- Ekstraklasa: 2020–21

Portugal U20

- FIFA U-20 World Cup runner-up: 2011

Orders

- Knight of the Order of Prince Henry
