= Daniel Mikołajewski (footballer, born 1999) =

Polish footballer

Personal information
- Full name: Daniel Mikołajewski
- Date of birth: 25 August 1999 (age 27)
- Place of birth: Bielsko-Biała, Poland
- Height: 1.88 m (6 ft 2 in)
- Position: Defender

Team information
- Current team: Borneo Samarinda
- Number: 89

Youth career
- –2016: Podbeskidzie

Senior career*
Years	Team	Apps	(Gls)
2016	Podbeskidzie	11	(0)
2016–2019	Lechia Gdańsk	0	(0)
2016	→ GKS Tychy (loan)	5	(0)
2016–2017	→ Stomil Olsztyn (loan)	10	(0)
2018–2019	Lechia Gdańsk II	26	(4)
2020–2022	Raków Częstochowa	11	(0)
2021–2022	→ Podbeskidzie (loan)	27	(0)
2022–2024	Podbeskidzie	52	(6)
2024–2026	Wieczysta Kraków	42	(0)
2026	Wieczysta Kraków II	9	(0)
2026–	Borneo Samarinda	0	(0)

International career
2016	Poland U18	5	(0)
2017	Poland U19	4	(0)
- * Club domestic league appearances and goals as of 21:13, 31 May 2026 (UTC)

Daniel Mikołajewski (born 25 August 1999) is a Polish professional footballer who plays as a defender for Super League club Borneo Samarinda.

== Club career ==
Mikołajewski's footballing career started with Podbeskidzie at the age of 16. Despite being one of the youngest in the Podbeskidzie squad, he was often in the starting eleven with the team being in the I liga. In 2017, 6 months into his professional career, Mikołajewski moved to Ekstraklasa team Lechia Gdańsk in January. When he first joined Lechia Mikołajewski started training with the Lechia Gdańsk II team, and joined GKS Tychy for the remainder of the season. After his loan at Tychy, Mikołajewski joined Stomil Olsztyn on a season long loan. After two loan spells away from Lechia, Mikołajewski started training with the first team in 2018.

== Honours ==
Raków Częstochowa

- Polish Cup: 2020–21

Wieczysta Kraków II

- IV liga Lesser Poland: 2025–26
