= Filip Dymerski =

Polish footballer

Personal information
- Full name: Filip Dymerski
- Date of birth: 5 April 2002 (age 24)
- Place of birth: Olsztyn, Poland
- Height: 1.87 m (6 ft 2 in)
- Position: Defender

Youth career
- 2012–2017: Naki Olsztyn
- 2017–2018: Lechia Gdańsk

Senior career*
Years	Team	Apps	(Gls)
2018–2022	Lechia Gdańsk	2	(0)
2018–2022	Lechia Gdańsk II	26	(0)
2020–2021	→ Bytovia Bytów (loan)	28	(1)
2021–2022	→ Sokół Ostróda (loan)	23	(0)
2022	AS Kolbudy	4	(0)

International career
2019	Poland U17	5	(0)
2019	Poland U19	6	(0)
- * Club domestic league appearances and goals

Filip Dymerski (born 5 April 2002) is a Polish former professional footballer who played as a defender.
