= Bartosz Frankowski =

Polish football referee (born 1986)

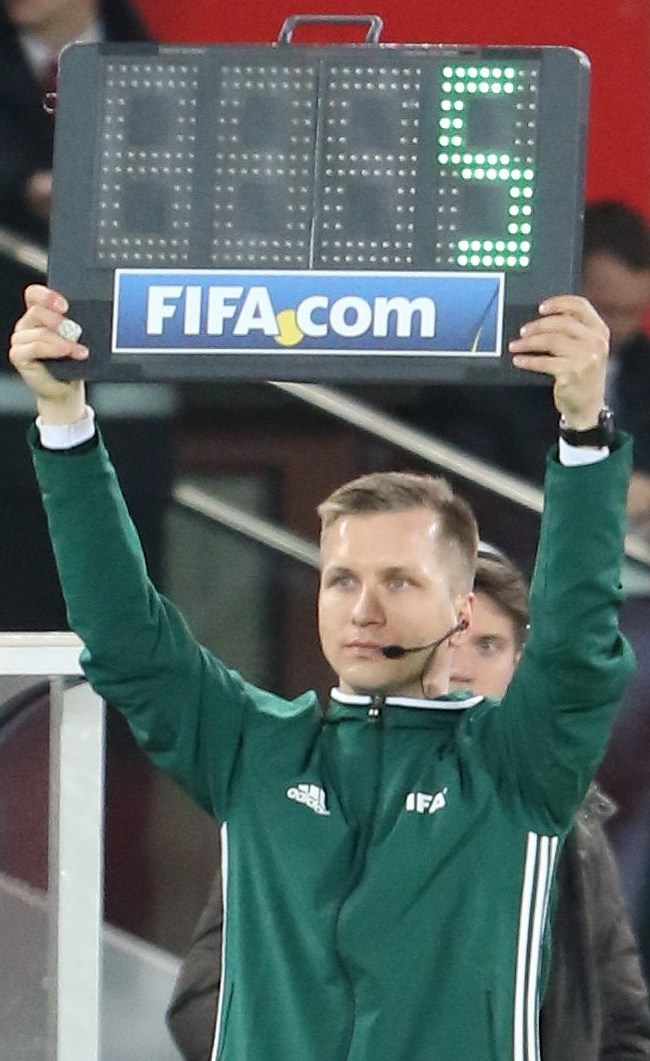
- Frankowski in 2016
- Born: 23 September 1986 (age 40); Poland

Domestic
Years	League	Role
2008–2015	II liga	Referee
2010–	I liga	Referee
2012–	Ekstraklasa	Referee

International
Years	League	Role
2014–	FIFA listed	Referee

Bartosz Frankowski (born 23 September 1986) is a Polish football referee who officiates in the Ekstraklasa. He has been a FIFA referee since 2014, and is ranked as a UEFA first category referee.

== Refereeing career ==
Frankowski began officiating in the II liga in 2008, the I liga in 2010 and the Ekstraklasa in 2012. He officiated his first Ekstraklasa match on 6 May 2012 between GKS Bełchatów and Cracovia. In 2014, he was put on the FIFA referees list. He officiated his first senior international match on 23 May 2014 between Slovakia and Montenegro. He officiated his first UEFA club competition match on 24 July 2014, a meeting between Swedish club IFK Göteborg and Hungarian club Győr in the 2014–15 UEFA Europa League second qualifying round.

Frankowski has been selected for various youth international tournaments, including the 2016 UEFA European Under-17 Championship in Azerbaijan, the 2018 UEFA European Under-19 Championship in Finland and the 2021 UEFA European Under-21 Championship in Hungary and Slovenia. He also served as a video assistant referee at the 2019 FIFA U-17 World Cup in Brazil.

Frankowski officiated the 2019 Polish Cup Final between Jagiellonia Białystok and Lechia Gdańsk. He has also officiated matches in other countries, including in the 2016 J1 League of Japan and the 2018–19 Saudi Professional League, as well as the 2018 Moldovan Cup Final.

On 21 April 2021, Frankowski was selected as a support match official for UEFA Euro 2020, held across Europe in June and July 2021, and acted as a fourth official.
