= Žarko Udovičić =

Serbian footballer

Personal information
- Date of birth: 31 August 1987 (age 39)
- Place of birth: Titovo Užice, SFR Yugoslavia
- Height: 1.85 m (6 ft 1 in)
- Position: Left-back

Senior career*
Years	Team	Apps	(Gls)
2005–2006	Morava Katrga		
2006–2008	Sloboda Užice	35	(4)
2008–2011	Mladost Lučani	110	(11)
2012–2014	Napredak Kruševac	63	(3)
2014–2015	Novi Pazar	14	(0)
2015–2019	Zagłębie Sosnowiec	108	(12)
2019–2021	Lechia Gdańsk	23	(3)
2021–2022	Raków Częstochowa	3	(0)
2022–2026	Mladost Lučani	139	(5)
- * Club domestic league appearances and goals as of 13 September 2026

Žarko Udovičić (Serbian Cyrillic: Жарко Удовичић; born 31 August 1987) is a Serbian professional footballer who plays as a left-back.

== Career ==
Udovičić previously played for Morava Katrga, Sloboda Užice and Mladost Lučani. In February 2015, he was threatened at gunpoint by a group of Novi Pazar fans after missing a penalty against FK Rad.

== Honours ==
Napredak

- Serbian First League: 2012–13

Lechia Gdańsk

- Polish Super Cup: 2019

Raków Częstochowa

- Polish Cup: 2021–22
