= Egzon Kryeziu =

Slovenian footballer

Personal information
- Full name: Egzon Kryeziu
- Date of birth: 25 April 2000 (age 26)
- Place of birth: Kranj, Slovenia
- Height: 1.80 m (5 ft 11 in)
- Position: Midfielder

Team information
- Current team: Avia Świdnik
- Number: 80

Youth career
- –2019: Triglav Kranj

Senior career*
Years	Team	Apps	(Gls)
2017−2020	Triglav Kranj	65	(5)
2020–2022	Lechia Gdańsk	17	(0)
2020–2022	Lechia Gdańsk II	9	(6)
2022–2026	Górnik Łęczna	91	(9)
2026–	Avia Świdnik	0	(0)

International career
2015−2016	Slovenia U16	7	(0)
2016−2017	Slovenia U17	12	(0)
2017−2018	Slovenia U18	5	(0)
2018−2019	Slovenia U19	7	(0)
2019−2020	Slovenia U21	8	(0)
- * Club domestic league appearances and goals as of 15:52, 26 May 2026 (UTC)

Egzon Kryeziu (born 25 April 2000) is a Slovenian professional footballer who plays as a midfielder for II liga club Avia Świdnik.

== Personal life ==
Kryeziu is the brother of Mentor Kryeziu and Edison Kryeziu.

== Honours ==
Triglav Kranj

- Slovenian Second League: 2016–17
