= Rafał Pietrzak =

Polish footballer (born 1992)

Personal information
- Date of birth: 30 January 1992 (age 34)
- Place of birth: Sosnowiec, Poland
- Height: 1.76 m (5 ft 9 in)
- Position: Left-back

Team information
- Current team: Wieczysta Kraków II

Youth career
- 2007: Zagłębie Sosnowiec

Senior career*
Years	Team	Apps	(Gls)
2008–2011	Zagłębie Sosnowiec	55	(1)
2010–2011	→ Górnik Zabrze (loan)	5	(0)
2011–2013	Górnik Zabrze	0	(0)
2011–2012	→ Piast Gliwice (loan)	9	(0)
2012–2013	→ Kolejarz Stróże (loan)	24	(0)
2013–2016	GKS Katowice	81	(3)
2016–2019	Wisła Kraków	51	(4)
2018	→ Zagłębie Lubin (loan)	4	(0)
2019	Mouscron	15	(0)
2020–2023	Lechia Gdańsk	100	(1)
2023–2026	Wieczysta Kraków	73	(0)
2025–	Wieczysta Kraków II	7	(1)

International career
	Poland U18	4	(0)
2010	Poland U19	15	(1)
2010–2011	Poland U20	3	(0)
2018–2020	Poland	3	(0)
- * Club domestic league appearances and goals as of 21:06, 31 May 2026 (UTC)

Rafał Pietrzak (born 30 January 1992) is a Polish professional footballer who plays as a defender for III liga club Wieczysta Kraków II. Besides Poland, he has played in Belgium.

== Club career ==
Pietrzak was born in Sosnowiec. In August 2010, he joined Górnik Zabrze on a one-year loan from Zagłębie Sosnowiec. In June 2011, he permanently signed with Górnik Zabrze.

In August 2011, he was loaned to Piast Gliwice on a one-year deal.

== International career ==
Pietrzak was a part of the Poland national under-19 team.

Pietrzak received his first call up to the Poland national team in September 2018 for the UEFA Nations League game against Italy. He replaced Jakub Błaszczykowski in the 80th minute to earn his first cap in a 1–1 draw.

== Career statistics ==
=== International ===
Appearances and goals by national team and year
National team	Year	Apps	Goals
Poland	2018	2	0
Poland	2020	1	0
Total		3	0

== Honours ==
Piast Gliwice

- I liga: 2011–12

Wieczysta Kraków

- III liga, group IV: 2023–24

Wieczysta Kraków II

- IV liga Lesser Poland: 2025–26
