= Conrado (footballer, born 1997) =

Brazilian footballer

Personal information
- Full name: Conrado Buchanelli Holz
- Date of birth: 3 April 1997 (age 29)
- Place of birth: Ajuricaba, Brazil
- Height: 1.73 m (5 ft 8 in)
- Positions: Left-back; left winger

Team information
- Current team: Radomiak Radom
- Number: 97

Youth career
- 2010–2017: Grêmio

Senior career*
Years	Team	Apps	(Gls)
2017	Grêmio	5	(0)
2018–2019	Oeste	30	(1)
2019	Figueirense	12	(0)
2020–2024	Lechia Gdańsk	118	(5)
2025	Atlético Goianiense	11	(0)
2025–2026	Oțelul Galați	29	(8)
2026–	Radomiak Radom	2	(0)
- * Club domestic league appearances and goals as of 2 August 2026

Conrado Buchanelli Holz (born 3 April 1997), commonly known as Conrado, is a Brazilian professional footballer who plays as a left-back for Ekstraklasa club Radomiak Radom.

== Club career ==
=== Gremio ===
Born in Ajuricaba, Conrado is a youth exponent from Grêmio. In 2017 he was promoted to the first team and made his league debut on 28 May 2017 against Sport Recife, starting as a left midfielder in a 4–3 away loss, playing the full 90 minutes.

=== Oeste ===
During the 2018 season Conrado joined Campeonato Brasileiro Série B side Oeste. He scored his first goal as a professional for the club on 20 March 2018 in a 1-0 victory over Sertãozinho in the Campeonato Paulista Série A2. On 20 October 2018, Conrado scored his first goal in Série B, scoring the equalizer in a 1-1 draw with Avaí FC.

=== Figueirense ===
During October 2019, Conrado was announced as a new signing for Figueirense. He made his debut for the club on 8 October 2019 in a 0-0 draw with Botafogo-SP in Série B.

=== Lechia Gdańsk ===
In January 2020, he joined Lechia Gdańsk. He made his Ekstraklasa debut on 7 February 2020 against Śląsk Wrocław as a left winger, assisting a goal scored by Flávio Paixão in a 2–2 draw. On 7 March 2020, Conrado scored his first goal for the club in a 4–4 draw with Zagłębie Lubin. On 3 December 2024, it was reported he filed for his contract to be unilaterally terminated due to non-payments. The following day, Lechia denied Conrado's claims in a statement, affirming they have 'fulfilled all obligations towards the player on time' and that his contract remained in effect.

=== Oțelul Galați ===
On 7 September 2025, Conrado signed a one-year contract with the Romanian Liga I club Oțelul Galați.

=== Radomiak Radom ===
On 8 July 2026, Conrado returned to Poland and joined top-flight side Radomiak Radom on a two-year contract.

== Personal life ==
Due to his family heritage, Conrado was eligible for both Italian and German citizenships. He obtained an Italian passport in 2020.

== Honours ==
Lechia Gdańsk

- I liga: 2023–24
