= Omran Haydary =

Afghan footballer (born 1998)

Personal information
- Full name: Ahmad Omran Haydary
- Date of birth: 13 January 1998 (age 28)
- Place of birth: Mazar-i-Sharif, Afghanistan
- Height: 1.72 m (5 ft 8 in)
- Position: Winger

Team information
- Current team: Sūduva

Youth career
- MSP '03
- 2007–2017: Roda JC Kerkrade

Senior career*
Years	Team	Apps	(Gls)
2017–2018	FC Emmen	15	(4)
2018–2019	FC Dordrecht	16	(2)
2019	Olimpia Grudziądz	20	(12)
2020–2023	Lechia Gdańsk	26	(3)
2022–2023	→ Arka Gdynia (loan)	29	(9)
2023–2024	Torpedo Kutaisi	8	(0)
2024	→ Samtredia (loan)	18	(4)
2025–	Sūduva	0	(0)

International career^{‡}
2018–	Afghanistan	14	(1)
- * Club domestic league appearances and goals as of 31 January 2025 ‡ National team caps and goals as of 4 May 2024

Omran Haydary (Dari: عمران حیدری; born 13 January 1998) is an Afghan professional footballer who plays as a winger for A Lyga club Sūduva. He has played football in the Netherlands, Poland, Georgia and Lithuania.

== Club career ==
=== FC Emmen ===
In July 2017, Haydary moved to FC Emmen on a free transfer following the end of his youth contract with Roda JC. He made his Eerste Divisie debut for FC Emmen on 15 September 2017 in a game against N.E.C. He scored his first league goal for the club on 29 September 2017 in a 2–2 away draw with De Graafschap. His goal, assisted by Keziah Veendorp, came in the 67th minute. On 19 April 2018, Haydary's contract with Emmen was terminated by mutual consent.

=== Dordrecht ===
Haydary spent just five days as a free agent before being offered a contract by Dordrecht. He made his league debut for the club on 24 August 2018 in a 5–2 away defeat to Ajax II. He scored his first league goal for the club on 21 September 2018 in a 2–1 away defeat to MVV Maastricht. His goal, assisted by Maarten Peijnenburg, came in the 91st minute.

On 31 January 2019, Haydary terminated his contract by mutual consent.

=== Poland ===
At the start of the 2019–20 season, he joined Polish club Olimpia Grudziądz. In January 2020, he was recruited by Lechia Gdańsk for a fee reported to be around €125,000. He made his debut for Lechia Gdańsk on 1 March 2020 against Korona Kielce in which he started as right winger.

On 6 July 2022, he was loaned to I liga side Arka Gdynia, Lechia's arch-rivals, for a year.

=== Sūduva ===
On 30 January 2025, Haydary signed with Lithuanian club Sūduva.

== International career ==
Haydary debuted for the Afghanistan national football team in a 0–0 friendly tie with Palestine on 19 August 2018.

=== International goals ===
Scores and results list Afghanistan's goal tally first.

No.	Date	Venue	Opponent	Score	Result	Competition
1.	7 June 2019	Pamir Stadium, Dushanbe, Tajikistan	Tajikistan	1–0	1–1	Friendly

== Honours ==
Individual

- I liga Player of the Month: September 2022
