= Paweł Gil =

Polish football referee (born 1976)

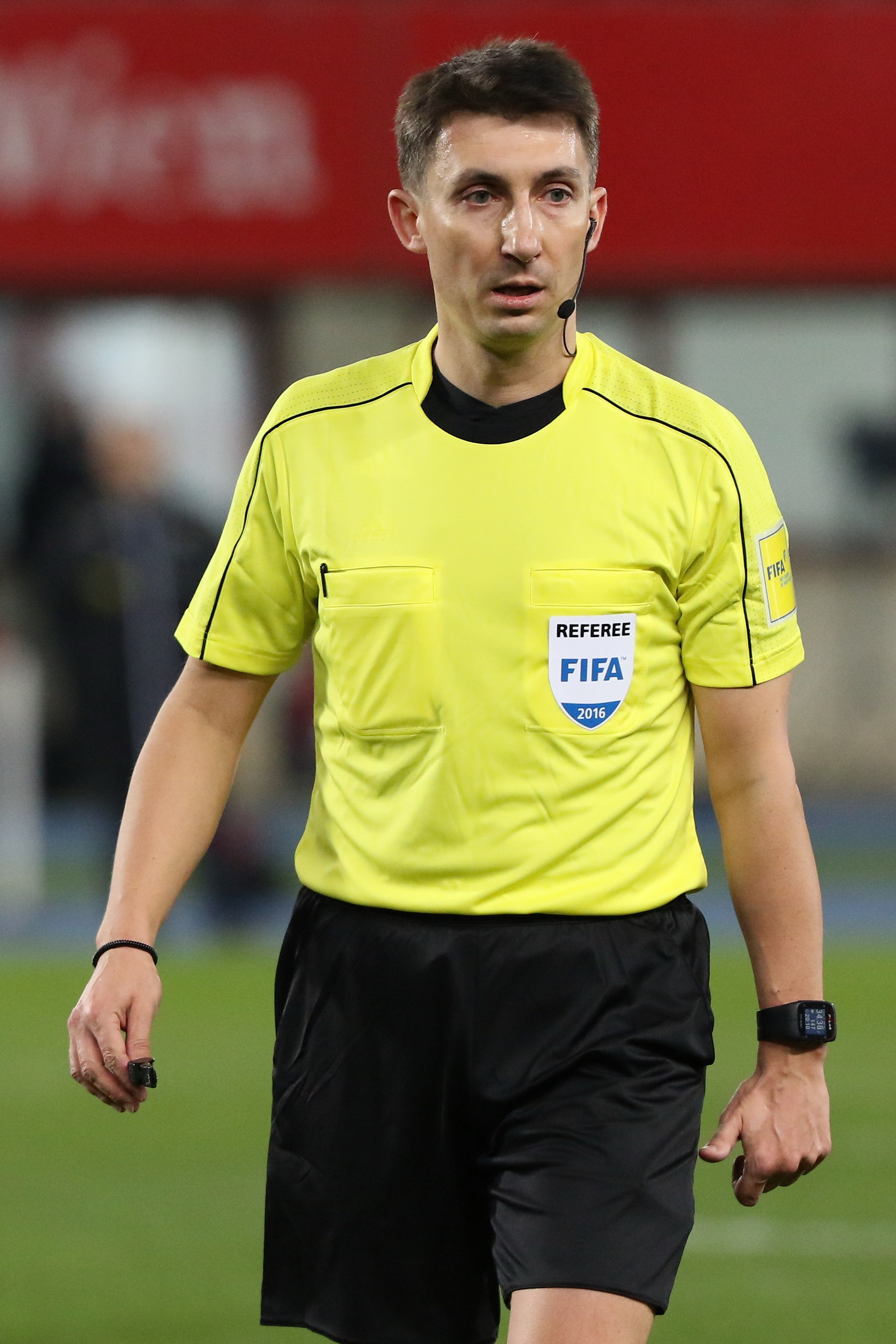
- Gil in 2016
- Full name: Paweł Gil
- Born: 28 June 1976 (age 50); Lublin, Poland

Domestic
| Years | League | Role |
| 2003–2005 | II liga | Referee |
| 2003–2021 | Polish Cup | Referee |
| 2005–2021 | Ekstraklasa | Referee |

International
| Years | League | Role |
| 2009–2021 | FIFA listed | Referee |

Paweł Gil (born 28 June 1976) is a Polish former football referee.

Gil became a FIFA referee in 2009. He has served as a referee in international competitions including UEFA Euro 2012 qualification and 2014 World Cup qualifiers. Moreover, he refereed at 2012–13 UEFA Champions League and the 2020–21 Polish Cup final game.

On 13 August 2021, he announced the end of his referee's career. The decision was related to starting a job at UEFA connected with VAR.
