= Tomasz Makowski (footballer) =

Polish association football playwe

Personal information
- Full name: Tomasz Michał Makowski
- Date of birth: 19 July 1999 (age 27)
- Place of birth: Zgierz, Poland
- Height: 1.79 m (5 ft 10 in)
- Position: Midfielder

Team information
- Current team: Polonia Warsaw
- Number: 36

Youth career
- WUKS Rosanów
- 2010–2015: UKS SMS Łódź

Senior career*
Years	Team	Apps	(Gls)
2015–2019	Lechia Gdańsk II	12	(1)
2016–2022	Lechia Gdańsk	84	(2)
2017–2018	→ Górnik Łęczna (loan)	20	(0)
2022–2026	Zagłębie Lubin	95	(3)
2022–2026	Zagłębie Lubin II	5	(0)
2026–	Polonia Warsaw	0	(0)

International career
2014–2015	Poland U16	10	(0)
2015–2016	Poland U17	11	(0)
2016–2017	Poland U18	6	(0)
2017–2018	Poland U19	9	(0)
2018–2019	Poland U20	13	(4)
2020	Poland U21	2	(0)
- * Club domestic league appearances and goals as of 15:08, 27 May 2025 (UTC)

Tomasz Michał Makowski (born 19 July 1999) is a Polish professional footballer who plays as a midfielder for I liga club Polonia Warsaw.

== Honours ==
Lechia Gdańsk

- Polish Cup: 2018–19
- Polish Super Cup: 2019

Individual

- Ekstraklasa Young Player of the Month: March 2019
