= 2021–22 Lechia Gdańsk season =

Lechia Gdańsk
2021–22 season
- Manager: Piotr Stokowiec (– Aug 28) Tomasz Kaczmarek (Sep 1 –)
- Stadium: Stadion Gdańsk
- Ekstraklasa: 4th
- Polish Cup: Round of 32
- Top goalscorer: League: Łukasz Zwoliński (14); All: Łukasz Zwoliński (16)
| Home colours | Away colours |

The 2021–22 Lechia Gdańsk season is the club's 78th season of existence, and their 14th continuous in the top flight of Polish football. The season covered the period from 1 July 2021 to 30 June 2022.

== Players ==
=== First team squad ===
Note: Flags indicate national team as defined under FIFA eligibility rules; some limited exceptions apply. Players may hold more than one non-FIFA nationality.

| No. | Pos. | Nation | Player |
|---|---|---|---|
| 1 | GK | SRB | Zlatan Alomerović (substituted off) |
| 1 | GK | POL | Michał Buchalik (substituted on) |
| 2 | DF | POL | Rafał Pietrzak |
| 3 | DF | SWE | Henrik Castegren (substituted on) |
| 4 | DF | LVA | Kristers Tobers |
| 5 | DF | POL | Bartosz Kopacz (substituted off) |
| 6 | MF | POL | Jarosław Kubicki |
| 7 | MF | POL | Maciej Gajos |
| 8 | MF | SVN | Egzon Kryeziu |
| 9 | FW | POL | Łukasz Zwoliński |
| 10 | FW | MLI | Bassekou Diabaté |
| 11 | FW | AFG | Omran Haydary |
| 12 | GK | SVK | Dušan Kuciak |
| 17 | FW | POL | Mateusz Żukowski (substituted off) |
| 20 | DF | BRA | Conrado |
| 22 | MF | SWE | Joseph Ceesay |
| 23 | DF | CRO | Mario Maloča |

| No. | Pos. | Nation | Player |
|---|---|---|---|
| 25 | DF | POL | Michał Nalepa |
| 27 | FW | POL | Łukasz Zjawiński (substituted off) |
| 28 | FW | POR | Flávio Paixão |
| 29 | DF | AUT | David Stec (substituted on) |
| 30 | MF | POL | Miłosz Szczepański (substituted off) |
| 33 | MF | GER | Marco Terrazzino |
| 36 | MF | POL | Tomasz Makowski |
| 69 | MF | POL | Jan Biegański |
| 72 | DF | POL | Filip Koperski |
| 76 | MF | GER | Christian Clemens (substituted on) |
| 77 | MF | POL | Tomasz Neugebauer (substituted on) |
| 78 | DF | UKR | Mykola Musolitin (substituted off) |
| 79 | FW | POL | Kacper Sezonienko |
| 80 | MF | IDN | Witan Sulaeman (substituted off) |
| 83 | GK | POL | Antoni Mikułko |
| 88 | MF | POL | Jakub Kałuziński |
| 99 | MF | TUR | İlkay Durmuş |

Key

| Symbol | Meaning |
|---|---|
| Substituted on | Player arrived during the winter transfer window. |
| Substituted off | Player left at any point during the season after making an appearance for the first team. |

=== Out on loan ===
Note: Flags indicate national team as defined under FIFA eligibility rules; some limited exceptions apply. Players may hold more than one non-FIFA nationality.

| No. | Pos. | Nation | Player |
|---|---|---|---|
| 77 | DF | POL | Rafał Kobryń (at Sandecja Nowy Sącz from 5 July 2021 until 30 June 2022) |
| 55 | DF | POL | Filip Dymerski (at Sokół Ostróda from 22 July 2021 until 30 June 2022) |
| 39 | GK | POL | Eryk Mirus (at Pogoń Grodzisk from 27 July 2021 until 30 June 2022) |
| 27 | FW | POL | Łukasz Zjawiński (at Sandecja Nowy Sącz from 3 January 2022 until 30 June 2022) |

=== Transfers ===
==== In ====
| No. | Pos. | Player | From | Type | Window | Fee | Date | Source |
|---|---|---|---|---|---|---|---|---|
| 99 | MF | İlkay Durmuş | St Mirren F.C. | Transfer | Summer | Free | 1 July 2021 | |
| 30 | MF | Miłosz Szczepański | Raków Częstochowa | Transfer | Summer | Free | 1 July 2021 | |
| 10 | FW | Bassekou Diabaté | Yeelen Olympique | Loan | Summer | Free | 15 July 2021 | |
| 27 | FW | Łukasz Zjawiński | Stal Mielec | Transfer | Summer | Free | 30 July 2021 | |
| 33 | MF | Marco Terrazzino | SC Paderborn | Transfer | Summer | Free | 10 August 2021 | |
| 80 | MF | Witan Sulaeman | Radnik Surdulica | Transfer | Summer | Free | 31 August 2021 | |
| 77 | MF | Tomasz Neugebauer | Ruch Chorzów | Transfer | Winter | €50k | 1 January 2022 | |
| 1 | GK | Michał Buchalik | Wisła Kraków | Loan | Winter | Free | 1 January 2022 | |
| 10 | FW | Bassekou Diabaté | Yeelen Olympique | Transfer | Winter | €50k | 1 January 2022 | |
| 29 | DF | David Stec | TSV Hartberg | Transfer | Winter | ?? | 8 January 2022 | |
| 76 | MF | Christian Clemens | Free agent | Transfer | Winter | Free | 3 February 2022 | |
| 3 | DF | Henrik Castegren | IFK Norrköping | Transfer | Winter | Free | 18 February 2022 | |

==== Out ====
| No. | Pos. | Player | To | Type | Window | Fee | Date | Source |
|---|---|---|---|---|---|---|---|---|
| 31 | MF | Žarko Udovičić | Raków Częstochowa | Transfer | Summer | Free | 1 July 2021 | |
| 19 | DF | Karol Fila | RC Strasbourg | Transfer | Summer | €1.5m | 1 July 2021 | |
| 10 | MF | Kacper Urbański | Bologna | Transfer | Summer | €750k | 1 July 2021 | |
| 32 | FW | Egy Maulana Vikri | FK Senica | Transfer | Summer | Free | 1 July 2021 | |
| 77 | DF | Rafał Kobryń | Sandecja Nowy Sącz | Loan | Summer | Free | 5 July 2021 | |
| 55 | DF | Filip Dymerski | Sokół Ostróda | Loan | Summer | Free | 22 July 2021 | |
| 39 | GK | Eryk Mirus | Pogoń Grodzisk | Loan | Summer | Free | 27 July 2021 | |
| 1 | GK | Zlatan Alomerović | Jagiellonia Białystok | Transfer | Winter | Free | 1 January 2022 | |
| 27 | FW | Łukasz Zjawiński | Sandecja Nowy Sącz | Loan | Winter | Free | 3 January 2022 | |
| 78 | DF | Mykola Musolitin | N/A | Mutual Termination | Winter | Free | 5 January 2022 | |
| 5 | DF | Bartosz Kopacz | Zagłębie Lubin | Transfer | Winter | €265k | 8 January 2022 | |
| 30 | MF | Miłosz Szczepański | Warta Poznań | Loan | Winter | Free | 20 January 2022 | |
| 80 | MF | Witan Sulaeman | FK Senica | Loan | Winter | Free | 21 January 2022 | |
| 17 | FW | Mateusz Żukowski | Rangers FC | Transfer | Winter | ?? | 31 January 2022 | |

== Competitions ==
=== Friendlies ===
==== Summer ====
| 23 June 2021 | Raków Częstochowa | 2–4 | Lechia Gdańsk | Częstochowa |
| 11:00 BST | Giannis Papanikolaou 24'; Sebastian Musiolik 83' | | Rafał Pietrzak 28'; Flávio Paixão 41'; Michał Nalepa 61'; İlkay Durmuş 86' | Stadium: Miejski Stadion Piłkarski Raków |

| 30 June 2021 | Legia Warsaw | 3–2 | Lechia Gdańsk | Warsaw |
| 14:00 BST | | | | Stadium: Stadion Wojska Polskiego |

| 3 July 2021 | Lech Poznań | 0–1 | Lechia Gdańsk | Poznań |
| 14:00 BST | | | İlkay Durmuş 22' | Stadium: Stadion Poznań |

| 6 July 2021 | Lechia Gdańsk | 2–0 | Stomil Olsztyn | Gniewino |
| 16:00 BST | Kristers Tobers 32'; Flávio Paixão 49' | | | Stadium: Stadion Miejski |

| 9 July 2021 | Lechia Gdańsk | 0–2 | Radomiak Radom | Gniewino |
| 11:00 BST | | | Karol Angielski 48'; Mario Rondón 65' | Stadium: Stadion Miejski |

| 13 July 2021 | Lechia Gdańsk | 0–0 | Chojniczanka Chojnice | Gdańsk |
| 16:30 BST | | | | Stadium: MOSiR Stadium |

| 16 July 2021 | Lechia Gdańsk | 3–2 | FK Panevėžys | Gdańsk |
| 18:20 BST | Michał Nalepa 26'; Conrado 31', 45' | | Elivelto 22', 38' | Stadium: Polsat Plus Arena Gdańsk; Attendance: 5,000 |

| 4 September 2021 | Jeziorak Iława | 0–3 | Lechia Gdańsk | Iława |
| 14:00 BST | | | Flávio Paixão 48'; Joseph Ceesay 70', 83' | Stadium: Stadion Miejski |

| 8 October 2021 | Lechia Gdańsk | 5–0 | Stomil Olsztyn | Gdańsk |
| 12:00 BST | Kacper Sezonienko 18'; Rafał Pietrzak 41'; Omran Haydary 45', 57'; Bassekou Diabate 67' | | | Stadium: Gdańsk Sports Center Stadium |

==== Winter ====
| 13 January 2022 | Lechia Gdańsk | 3–2 | FC Botoșani | Belek |
| 14:30 BST | İlkay Durmuş 34'; Bassekou Diabate 49'; Kacper Sezonienko 83' | | Hervé Kage 15'; Enriko Papa 53' | Stadium: IC Hotels Football Center - Pitch A |

| 18 January 2022 | Lechia Gdańsk | 0–2 (a.e.t.) | Chornomorets Odesa | Antalya |
| 14:00 BST | | | Dmytro Yusov 71'; Beka Vachiberadze 90+7' | Stadium: Limak Football Center |

| 22 January 2022 | Lechia Gdańsk | 2–1 (a.e.t.) | FC Akhmat Grozny | Belek |
| 14:00 BST | Flávio Paixão 75'; Marco Terrazzino 102' | | Daniil Utkin 55' | Stadium: IC Hotels Football Center - Pitch A |

| 23 January 2022 | Lechia Gdańsk | Cancelled | FC Dinamo Batumi | Antalya |
| BST | | | | Stadium: Titanic Lara Sport Center |

| 28 January 2022 | Lechia Gdańsk | 1–1 (a.e.t.) | KKS Kalisz | Gdańsk |
| 12:00 BST | İlkay Durmuş 59' | | Maurycy Przybył 95' | Stadium: Gdańsk Sports Center Stadium |

| 9 February 2022 | Stomil Olsztyn | Cancelled | Lechia Gdańsk |
| BST |

==== Spring ====
| 14 April 2022 Global Tour for Peace | Lechia Gdańsk | 2–3 | FC Shakhtar Donetsk | Gdańsk |
| 18:30 BST | Bassekou Diabaté 11'; Krystian Okoniewski 90+2' | | Mykhailo Mudryk 7', 58'; Dima Keda 90+4' | Stadium: Polsat Plus Arena Gdańsk; Attendance: 12,620 |
Note: A football match as part of the European "Match for Peace!" Series. The club and the Lechia Foundation will donate the profits from tickets and fundraisers to support Ukrainian internal refugees who had to leave their place of residence due to the war

=== Ekstraklasa ===
==== League table ====
| Pos | Team | Pld | W | D | L | GF | GA | GD | Pts | Qualification or relegation |
|---|---|---|---|---|---|---|---|---|---|---|
| 2 | Raków Częstochowa | 34 | 20 | 9 | 5 | 60 | 30 | +30 | 69 | Qualification for the Europa Conference League second qualifying round |
| 3 | Pogoń Szczecin | 34 | 18 | 11 | 5 | 63 | 31 | +32 | 65 | Qualification for the Europa Conference League first qualifying round (Note: Since the winners of the 2021–22 Polish Cup, Raków Częstochowa, qualified for the Europa Conference League based on league position, the second Europa Conference League first qualifying round berth was transferred to the 4th-placed team.) |
| 4 | Lechia Gdańsk | 34 | 16 | 9 | 9 | 52 | 39 | +13 | 57 | Qualification for the Europa Conference League first qualifying round |
| 5 | Piast Gliwice | 34 | 15 | 9 | 10 | 45 | 37 | +8 | 54 | |
| 6 | Wisła Płock | 34 | 15 | 3 | 16 | 48 | 51 | −3 | 48 | |

Source: ekstraklasa.org
Rules for classification: 1) Points; 2) Head-to-head points; 3) Head-to-head goal difference; 4) Goal difference; 5) Goals scored; 6) Number of wins; 7) Number of away wins; 8) Lower number of points based on yellow and red cards (red card = 3 points, yellow card = 1 point, sending-off = 3 points - including 1 point for first yellow card); 9) Fairplay ranking; 10) Draw. (Note: Head-to-head record is used only after all the matches between the teams in question have been played)

==== Regular season ====
| 24 July 2021 1 | Jagiellonia Białystok | 1–1 | Lechia Gdańsk | Białystok |
| 16:30 BST | Jesús Imaz 55' | | Łukasz Zwoliński 52' | Stadium: Stadion Jagiellonii; Attendance: 8,193; Referee: Tomasz Kwiatkowski |

| 2 August 2021 2 | Lechia Gdańsk | 1–0 | Wisła Płock | Gdańsk |
| 17:00 BST | Dawid Kocyła 63 (OG)' | | | Stadium: Polsat Plus Arena Gdańsk; Attendance: 7,770; Referee: Bartosz Frankowski |

| 8 August 2021 3 | Śląsk Wrocław | 1–1 | Lechia Gdańsk | Wrocław |
| 19:00 BST | Dino Štiglec 33' | | Tomasz Makowski 90+5' | Stadium: Stadion Wrocław; Attendance: 9,075; Referee: Jarosław Przybył |

| 14 August 2021 4 | Lechia Gdańsk | 3–0 | Cracovia | Gdańsk |
| 16:30 BST | Maciej Gajos 42'; Mateusz Żukowski 84'; Łukasz Zwoliński 90+5' | | | Stadium: Polsat Plus Arena Gdańsk; Attendance: 9,315; Referee: Paweł Raczkowski |

| 22 August 2021 5 | Lech Poznań | 2–0 | Lechia Gdańsk | Poznań |
| 16:30 BST | Mikael Ishak 17'; Nika Kvekveskiri 62' | | | Stadium: Stadion Lecha; Attendance: 14,231; Referee: Krzysztof Jakubik |

| 28 August 2021 6 | Lechia Gdańsk | 2–2 | Radomiak Radom | Gdańsk |
| 14:00 BST | Mateusz Żukowski 12'; Maciej Gajos 19' | | Luís Machado 59'; Karol Angielski 64' (pen.) | Stadium: Polsat Plus Arena Gdańsk; Attendance: 8,456; Referee: Tomasz Kwiatkowski |

| 12 September 2021 7 | Wisła Kraków | 2–2 | Lechia Gdańsk | Kraków |
| 14:00 BST | Michal Frydrych 71', 90+7' | | Jarosław Kubicki 23'; İlkay Durmuş 45+1' | Stadium: Stadion im. Henryka Reymana; Referee: Paweł Raczkowski |

| 18 September 2021 8 | Lechia Gdańsk | 1–0 | Piast Gliwice | Gdańsk |
| 19:00 BST | Łukasz Zwoliński 11' | | | Stadium: Polsat Plus Arena Gdańsk; Attendance: 6,491; Referee: Tomasz Musiał |

| 24 September 2021 9 | Górnik Łęczna | 0–4 | Lechia Gdańsk | Łęczna |
| 17:00 BST | | | Łukasz Zwoliński 41'; Flávio Paixão 44', 71'; Kacper Sezonienko 55' | Stadium: Stadion Górnika Łęczna; Attendance: 2,499; Referee: Damian Sylwestrzak |

| 3 October 2021 10 | Lechia Gdańsk | 3–1 | Legia Warsaw | Gdańsk |
| 16:30 BST | Maciej Gajos 34'; Jarosław Kubicki 53'; Łukasz Zwoliński 67' | | Tomáš Pekhart 88' (pen.) | Stadium: Polsat Plus Arena Gdańsk; Attendance: 23,574; Referee: Szymon Marciniak |

| 16 October 2021 11 | Bruk-Bet Termalica Nieciecza | 0–2 | Lechia Gdańsk | Nieciecza |
| 14:00 BST | | | Flávio Paixão 55'; Conrado 56' | Stadium: Stadion Sportowy; Attendance: 3,500; Referee: Krzysztof Jakubik |

| 23 October 2021 12 | Lechia Gdańsk | 1–1 | Górnik Zabrze | Gdańsk |
| 14:00 BST | Łukasz Zwoliński 10' | | Bartosz Nowak 42' | Stadium: Polsat Plus Arena Gdańsk; Attendance: 10,935; Referee: Tomasz Kwiatkowski |

| 30 October 2021 13 | Warta Poznań | 0–2 | Lechia Gdańsk | Poznań |
| 14:00 BST | | | Flávio Paixão 90+5' (pen.); Jan Grzesik 90+7 (OG)' | Stadium: Stadion Dyskobolii Grodzisk Wielkopolski; Attendance: 1,140; Referee: Paweł Malec |

| 6 November 2021 14 | Lechia Gdańsk | 2–1 | Zagłębie Lubin | Gdańsk |
| 16:30 BST | Marco Terrazzino 84', 90+4' | | Filip Starzyński 6' (pen.) | Stadium: Polsat Plus Arena Gdańsk; Attendance: 6,416; Referee: Bartosz Frankowski |

| 20 November 2021 15 | Stal Mielec | 3–3 | Lechia Gdańsk | Mielec |
| 16:30 BST | Maksymilian Sitek 13'; Grzegorz Tomasiewicz 66' (pen.); Mateusz Mak 77' | | İlkay Durmuş 37'; Marco Terrazzino 45+1', 59' | Stadium: Stadion Stali Mielec; Referee: Tomasz Kwiatkowski |

| 27 November 2021 16 | Pogoń Szczecin | 5–1 | Lechia Gdańsk | Szczecin |
| 16:30 BST | Damian Dąbrowski 8' (pen.); Luka Zahović 36', 51'; Sebastian Kowalczyk 54'; Michał Kucharczyk 69' | | Łukasz Zwoliński 27' | Stadium: Stadion im. Floriana Krygiera; Referee: Piotr Lasyk |

| 4 December 2021 17 | Lechia Gdańsk | 3–1 | Raków Częstochowa | Gdańsk |
| 19:00 BST | İlkay Durmuş 53', 75'; Flávio Paixão 86' | | Ben Lederman 16' | Stadium: Polsat Plus Arena Gdańsk; Attendance: 6,393; Referee: Tomasz Musiał |

| 11 December 2021 18 | Lechia Gdańsk | 1–2 | Jagiellonia Białystok | Gdańsk |
| 19:00 BST | Flávio Paixão 45' (pen.) | | Taras Romanczuk 35'; Bartosz Bida 54' | Stadium: Polsat Plus Arena Gdańsk; Referee: Paweł Raczkowski |

| 17 December 2021 19 | Wisła Płock | 1–0 | Lechia Gdańsk | Płock |
| 19:30 BST | Damian Rasak 3' | | | Stadium: Stadion im. Kazimierza Górskiego; Referee: Bartosz Frankowski |

| 5 February 2022 20 | Lechia Gdańsk | 2–0 | Śląsk Wrocław | Gdańsk |
| 19:00 BST | Jakub Kałuziński 22'; Michał Nalepa 57' | | | Stadium: Polsat Plus Arena Gdańsk; Attendance: 6,431; Referee: Bartosz Frankowski |

| 11 February 2022 21 | Cracovia | 2–0 | Lechia Gdańsk | Kraków |
| 19:30 BST | Michał Rakoczy 68'; Cornel Râpă 90' | | | Stadium: Stadion im. Józefa Piłsudskiego; Referee: Szymon Marciniak |

| 20 February 2022 22 | Lechia Gdańsk | 1–0 | Lech Poznań | Gdańsk |
| 16:30 BST | Filip Koperski 86' | | | Stadium: Polsat Plus Arena Gdańsk; Attendance: 11.002; Referee: Paweł Raczkowski |

| 27 February 2022 23 | Radomiak Radom | 2–0 | Lechia Gdańsk | Radom |
| 14:00 BST | Karol Angielski 33', 69' (pen.) | | | Stadium: Stadion Lekkoatletyczno-Piłkarski; Referee: Sebastian Jarzębak |

| 5 March 2022 24 | Lechia Gdańsk | 1–1 | Wisła Kraków | Gdańsk |
| 19:00 BST | Michal Frydrych 36 (OG)' | | Luis Fernández 89' | Stadium: Polsat Plus Arena Gdańsk; Referee: Paweł Raczkowski |

| 12 March 2022 25 | Piast Gliwice | 1–0 | Lechia Gdańsk | Gliwice |
| 16:30 BST | Ariel Mosór 68' | | | Stadium: Stadion im. Piotra Wieczorka; Referee: Sebastian Krasny |

| 19 March 2022 26 | Lechia Gdańsk | 2–0 | Górnik Łęczna | Gdańsk |
| 16:30 BST | Christian Clemens 45+1'; Łukasz Zwoliński 77' | | | Stadium: Polsat Plus Arena Gdańsk; Attendance: 4,817; Referee: Krzysztof Jakubik |

| 2 April 2022 27 | Legia Warsaw | 2–1 | Lechia Gdańsk | Warsaw |
| 19:00 BST | Paweł Wszołek 29'; Tomáš Pekhart 65' | | Łukasz Zwoliński 83' | Stadium: Stadion Wojska Polskiego; Attendance: 18,652; Referee: Damian Sylwestrzak |

| 9 April 2022 28 | Lechia Gdańsk | 2–0 | Bruk-Bet Termalica Nieciecza | Gdańsk |
| 19:00 BST | Łukasz Zwoliński 11'; Flávio Paixão 90+4' | | | Stadium: Polsat Plus Arena Gdańsk; Attendance: 4,677; Referee: Bartosz Frankowski |

| 18 April 2022 29 | Górnik Zabrze | 1–3 | Lechia Gdańsk | Zabrze |
| 16:30 BST | Bartosz Nowak 58' | | İlkay Durmuş 11', 86'; Maciej Gajos 83' (pen.) | Stadium: Stadion im. Ernesta Pohla; Attendance: 8,432; Referee: Jarosław Przybył |

| 23 April 2022 30 | Lechia Gdańsk | 2–0 | Warta Poznań | Gdańsk |
| 19:00 BST | Flávio Paixão 5', 17' | | | Stadium: Polsat Plus Arena Gdańsk; Attendance: 6,488; Referee: Bartosz Frankowski |

| 30 April 2022 31 | Zagłębie Lubin | 2–2 | Lechia Gdańsk | Lubin |
| 16:30 BST | Patryk Szysz 68'; Filip Starzyński 82' | | Aleks Ławniczak 7 (OG)'; Flávio Paixão 33' | Stadium: Stadion Zagłębia Lubin; Referee: Jarosław Przybył |

| 8 May 2022 32 | Lechia Gdańsk | 3–2 | Stal Mielec | Gdańsk |
| 11:30 BST | Łukasz Zwoliński 11', 31', 90+3' | | Mateusz Żyro 49'; Oskar Zawada 80' | Stadium: Polsat Plus Arena Gdańsk; Attendance: 11,303; Referee: Paweł Malec |

| 14 May 2022 33 | Lechia Gdańsk | 0–0 | Pogoń Szczecin | Gdańsk |
| 19:00 BST | | | | Stadium: Polsat Plus Arena Gdańsk; Attendance: 13,870; Referee: Damian Sylwestrzak |

| 21 May 2022 34 | Raków Częstochowa | 3–0 | Lechia Gdańsk | Częstochowa |
| 16:30 BST | Ivi 10', 12'; Vladislavs Gutkovskis 67' | | | Stadium: Miejski Stadion Piłkarski Raków; Attendance: 5,550; Referee: Damian Sylwestrzak |

=== Polish Cup ===
| 21 September 2021 Round of 64 | Jagiellonia Białystok | 1–3 | Lechia Gdańsk | Białystok |
| 16:30 GMT | Fedor Černych 64' | | Maciej Gajos 27'; Łukasz Zwoliński 40', 50' | Stadium: Stadion Jagiellonii; Attendance: 4,274; Referee: Tomasz Kwiatkowski |

| 26 October 2021 Round of 32 | Świt Nowy Dwór Mazowiecki | 2–1 | Lechia Gdańsk | Nowy Dwór Mazowiecki |
| 14:45 GMT | Arkadiusz Gajewski 47'; Filip Kowalczyk 63' | | İlkay Durmuş 8' (pen.) | Stadium: Municipal Stadium |

== Statistics ==
| | | | League | | Polish Cup | | Total | |
| No. | Pos. | Player | Apps | Goals | Apps | Goals | Apps | Goals |
|---|---|---|---|---|---|---|---|---|
| 1 | GK | Zlatan Alomerović | 6 | 0 | 1 | 0 | 7 | 0 |
| 1 | GK | Michał Buchalik | 1 | 0 | 0 | 0 | 1 | 0 |
| 2 | DF | Rafał Pietrzak | 29 | 0 | 1 | 0 | 30 | 0 |
| 4 | DF | Kristers Tobers | 11 | 0 | 0 | 0 | 11 | 0 |
| 5 | DF | Bartosz Kopacz | 14 | 0 | 2 | 0 | 16 | 0 |
| 6 | MF | Jarosław Kubicki | 30 | 2 | 1 | 0 | 31 | 2 |
| 7 | MF | Maciej Gajos | 31 | 4 | 1 | 1 | 32 | 5 |
| 8 | MF | Egzon Kryeziu | 13 | 0 | 0 | 0 | 13 | 0 |
| 9 | FW | Łukasz Zwoliński | 32 | 14 | 2 | 2 | 34 | 16 |
| 10 | FW | Bassekou Diabaté | 17 | 0 | 1 | 0 | 18 | 0 |
| 11 | MF | Omran Haydary | 1 | 0 | 0 | 0 | 1 | 0 |
| 12 | GK | Dušan Kuciak | 27 | 0 | 1 | 0 | 28 | 0 |
| 17 | FW | Mateusz Żukowski | 18 | 2 | 2 | 0 | 20 | 2 |
| 20 | DF | Conrado | 33 | 0 | 2 | 0 | 35 | 0 |
| 22 | MF | Joseph Ceesay | 23 | 0 | 0 | 0 | 23 | 0 |
| 23 | DF | Mario Maloča | 31 | 0 | 2 | 0 | 33 | 0 |
| 25 | DF | Michał Nalepa | 28 | 1 | 1 | 0 | 29 | 1 |
| 27 | FW | Łukasz Zjawiński | 2 | 0 | 1 | 0 | 3 | 0 |
| 28 | FW | Flávio Paixão | 32 | 10 | 1 | 0 | 33 | 10 |
| 29 | DF | David Stec | 5 | 0 | 0 | 0 | 5 | 0 |
| 30 | MF | Miłosz Szczepański | 1 | 0 | 1 | 0 | 2 | 0 |
| 33 | MF | Marco Terrazzino | 22 | 4 | 1 | 0 | 23 | 4 |
| 36 | MF | Tomasz Makowski | 15 | 1 | 1 | 0 | 16 | 1 |
| 69 | MF | Jan Biegański | 14 | 1 | 2 | 0 | 16 | 1 |
| 72 | DF | Filip Koperski | 6 | 1 | 0 | 0 | 6 | 1 |
| 76 | MF | Christian Clemens | 12 | 1 | 0 | 0 | 12 | 1 |
| 77 | MF | Tomasz Neugebauer | 1 | 0 | 0 | 0 | 1 | 0 |
| 78 | DF | Mykola Musolitin | 4 | 0 | 1 | 0 | 5 | 0 |
| 79 | FW | Kacper Sezonienko | 26 | 1 | 2 | 0 | 28 | 1 |
| 88 | MF | Jakub Kałuziński | 18 | 1 | 2 | 0 | 20 | 1 |
| 99 | MF | İlkay Durmuş | 33 | 6 | 2 | 1 | 35 | 7 |

=== Goalscorers ===
| Rank | Player | Goals |
|---|---|---|
| 1 | Łukasz Zwoliński | 16 |
| 2 | Flávio Paixão | 10 |
| 3 | İlkay Durmuş | 7 |
| 4 | Maciej Gajos | 5 |
| 5 | Marco Terrazzino | 4 |
| 5 | Own goals | 4 |
| 7 | Jarosław Kubicki | 2 |
| 7 | Mateusz Żukowski | 2 |
| 9 | Jan Biegański | 1 |
| 9 | Christian Clemens | 1 |
| 9 | Jakub Kałuziński | 1 |
| 9 | Filip Koperski | 1 |
| 9 | Tomasz Makowski | 1 |
| 9 | Michał Nalepa | 1 |
| 9 | Kacper Sezonienko | 1 |
