= Bassekou =

Bassekou is a Malian masculine given name. Notable people with the name include:

- Bassekou Diabaté (born 2000), Malian footballer
- Bassekou Kouyate (born 1966), Malian musician
