= Słuszewo railway station =

Railway station in Słuszewo, Poland

Słuszewo

General information
- Location: Słuszewo; Poland
- Coordinates: 54.669023°N 18.068359°E
- Owner: Polskie Koleje Państwowe S.A.
- Platforms: None

Construction
- Structure type: Building: Never existed Depot: Never existed Water tower: Never existed

History
- Former names: Schluschow until 1945
Location

Słuszewo is a non-operational PKP railway station on the disused PKP rail line 230 in Słuszewo (Pomeranian Voivodeship), Poland.

== Lines crossing the station ==
Start station	End station	Line type
Wejherowo	Garczegorze	Closed
