= Gniewino railway station =

Railway station in Poland

Gniewino
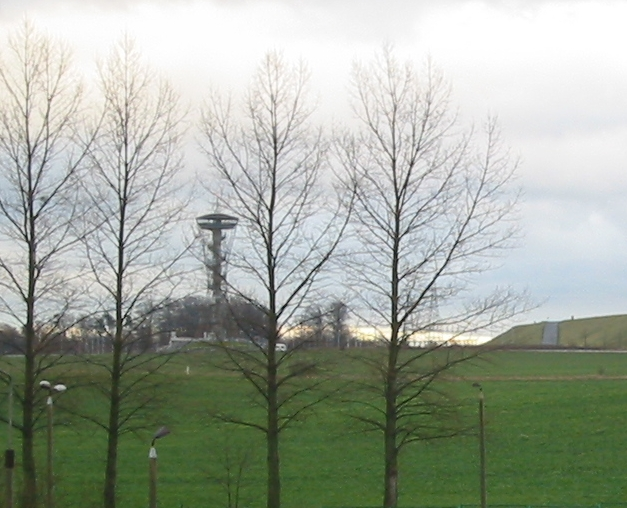

General information
- Location: Gniewino; Poland
- Coordinates: 54.714761°N 18.033419°E
- Owner: Polskie Koleje Państwowe S.A.
- Platforms: None

Construction
- Structure type: Building: No; Depot: Never existed Water tower: Never existed

History
- Former names: Fredrichsrode until 1945
Location

Gniewino is a non-operational PKP railway station on the disused PKP rail line 230 in Gniewino (Pomeranian Voivodeship), Poland. The station lies outside the town proper.

== Lines crossing the station ==
Start station	End station	Line type
Wejherowo	Garczegorze	Closed
