= Kostkowo railway station =

Former railway station in Poland

Kostkowo
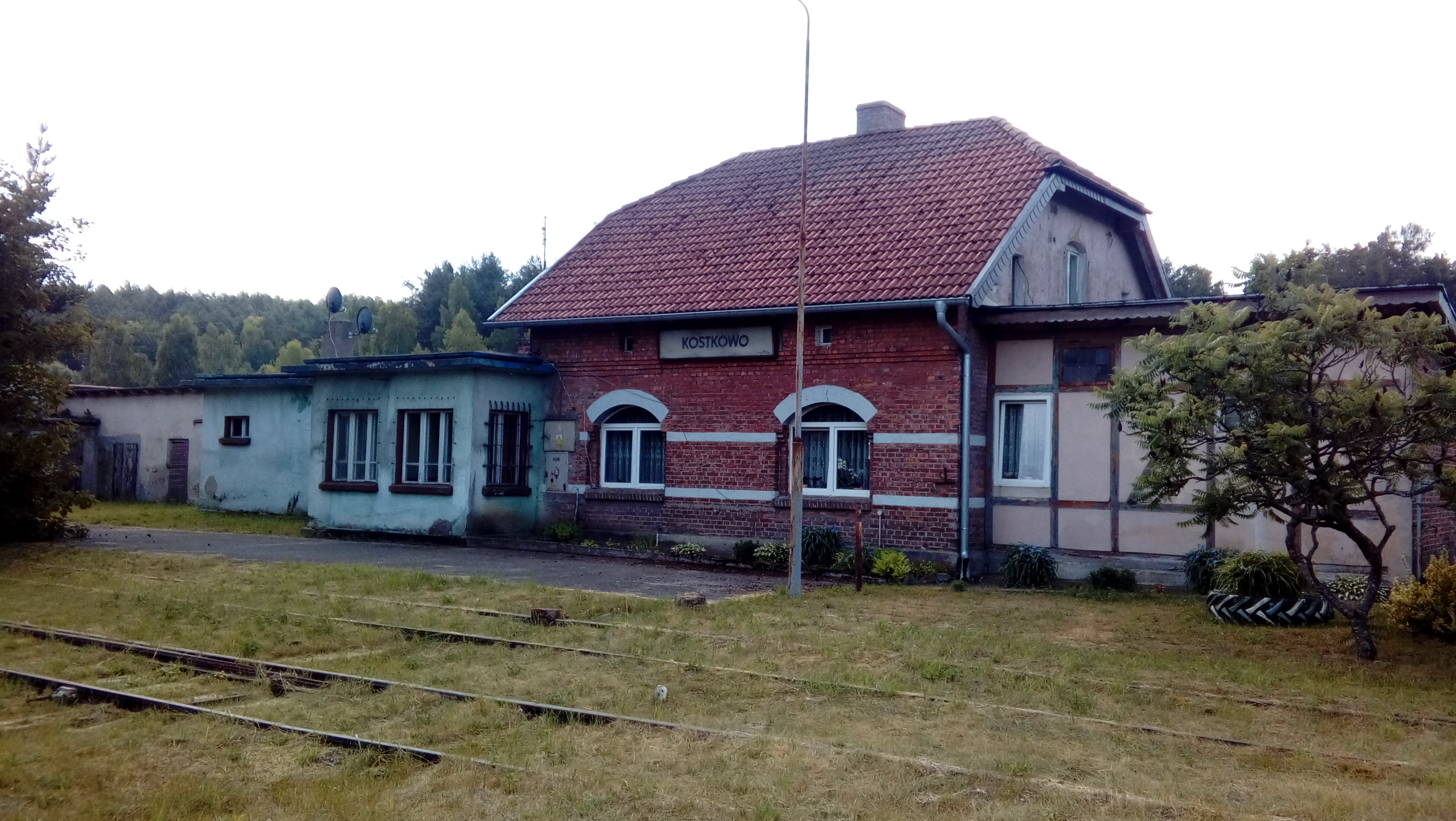

General information
- Location: Kostkowo; Poland
- Coordinates: 54.667714°N 18.036811°E
- Owner: Polskie Koleje Państwowe S.A.
- Platforms: None

Construction
- Structure type: Building: Yes (no longer used); Depot: Never existed Water tower: Never existed

History
- Former names: Hammer-Chinow until 1945
Location

Kostkowo is a non-operational PKP railway station on the disused PKP rail line 230 in Kostkowo (Pomeranian Voivodeship), Poland.

== Lines crossing the station ==
Start station	End station	Line type
Wejherowo	Garczegorze	Closed
