= Alpy =

Alpy may refer to:

- Alpı, Ujar, Azerbaijan
- Alpy, Pomeranian Voivodeship, Poland
- Alps, Alpy in Polish and West Slavic languages
- Alpy, mascot of the 1992 Winter Paralympics
