= Gmina Gniewino =

Gmina Gniewino Gniewino Commune
- Gmina
- Coat of arms
- Interactive map of Gmina Gniewino
- Coordinates (Gniewino): 54°43′0″N 18°0′30″E
- Country: Poland
- Voivodeship: Pomeranian
- County: Wejherowo
- Seat: Gniewino

Area
  - Total: 176.21 km^{2} (68.04 sq mi)

Population (2006)
  - Total: 6,828
  - Density: 38.75/km^{2} (100.4/sq mi)
- Time zone: UTC+1 (CET)
  - Summer (DST): UTC+2 (CEST)
- Website: http://www.gniewino.pl/

Gmina Gniewino is a rural gmina (administrative district) in Wejherowo County, Pomeranian Voivodeship, in northern Poland. Its seat is the village of Gniewino, which lies approximately 21 kilometres (13 mi) north-west of Wejherowo and 57 km (35 mi) north-west of the regional capital Gdańsk.

The gmina covers an area of 176.21 square kilometres (68.0 sq mi), and as of 2006 its total population is 6,828.

== Villages ==
Gmina Gniewino contains the villages and settlements of Alpy, Bychówko, Bychowo, Chynowie, Chynowiec, Czymanowo, Dąbrówka, Dębina, Gniewinko, Gniewino, Jęczewo, Kolkowo, Kostkowo, Łęczyn Dolny, Lisewo, Mierzynko, Mierzyno, Nadole, Nowy Młot, Opalino, Perlinko, Perlino, Płaczewo, Rybienko, Rybno, Rybska Karczma, Salinko, Salino, Słuszewo, Strzebielinek, Strzebielinko, Tadzino and Toliszczek.

== Neighbouring gminas ==
Gmina Gniewino is bordered by the gminas of Choczewo, Krokowa, Łęczyce, Luzino and Wejherowo.
