= Ísak Þorvaldsson =

Icelandic footballer (born 2001)

Personal information
- Full name: Ísak Snær Þorvaldsson
- Date of birth: 1 May 2001 (age 25)
- Place of birth: Mosfellsbær, Iceland
- Height: 1.82 m (6 ft 0 in)
- Positions: Left winger; forward

Team information
- Current team: Lyngby
- Number: 10

Youth career
- –2017: Afturelding
- 2017–2020: Norwich City

Senior career*
Years	Team	Apps	(Gls)
2020–2022	Norwich City	0	(0)
2020	→ Fleetwood Town (loan)	2	(0)
2020	→ St. Mirren (loan)	2	(0)
2020–2021	→ ÍA (loan)	27	(3)
2022	Breiðablik	24	(14)
2023–2026	Rosenborg	23	(5)
2024	→ Breiðablik (loan)	22	(9)
2025–2026	→ Lyngby (loan)	25	(7)
2026–	Lyngby	3	(0)

International career^{‡}
2017	Iceland U16	7	(0)
2017–2018	Iceland U17	5	(0)
2017	Iceland U18	2	(0)
2018	Iceland U19	9	(1)
2022	Iceland U21	2	(2)
2022–	Iceland	10	(1)
- * Club domestic league appearances and goals as of 16 August 2026 ‡ National team caps and goals as of 16 November 2026

Ísak Snær Þorvaldsson (born 1 May 2001) is an Icelandic professional footballer who plays for Danish Superliga club Lyngby, as a left winger and forward and the Iceland national team.

== Club career ==
Ísak started his career with local club Afturelding in Mosfellsbær before transferring to Norwich City in July 2017. He went on loan to Fleetwood Town at the end of January 2020.

He joined Scottish side Livingston on trial in October 2021 with a view to a loan move, which did not materialize.

On 20 July 2020, he signed for Scottish St. Mirren on a one-year loan. On 27 August 2020 his loan with St. Mirren was terminated early. Later that day he moved on loan to Icelandic club ÍA where he appeared in 7 matches. He was again loaned to ÍA for the 2021 season where he scored 3 goals in 20 Úrvalsdeild karla matches. He helped ÍA win its last three matches of the season and stave off relegation. He also helped the club to the Icelandic Cup final where they lost to Víkingur.

He left Norwich in January 2022 and signed a three-year contract with Breiðablik in the rebranded Besta-deild karla. He started the 2022 season strongly, scoring six goals in his first four matches, the best start since Guðmundur Benediktsson scored seven goals in the first four matches in 1996.

In October 2022, he signed for Rosenborg for the 2023 season. In April 2024 he returned on loan to Breiðablik.

After playing on loan, on 24 April 2026, he signed a permanent contract with Lyngby Boldklub until 2029.

== International career ==
Ísak has represented Iceland at under-16, under-17, under-18 and under-19 youth levels.

On 8 June 2022, Ísak was substituted on the 54th minute of Iceland U-21's 3–1 victory against Belarus and transferred to a hospital after suffering from chest pains during the match.

== Career statistics ==
As of match played 9 August 2026

Appearances and goals by club, season and competition
Club	Season	League			National cup		League cup		Europe		Other		Total	
Club	Season	Division	Apps	Goals	Apps	Goals	Apps	Goals	Apps	Goals	Apps	Goals	Apps	Goals
Norwich City U23	2019–20	—			—		—		—		2 (Note: Appearances in EFL Trophy)	0	2	0
Norwich City	2019–20	Premier League	0	0	0	0	0	0	0	0	—		0	0
Norwich City	2020–21	Championship	0	0	0	0	0	0	0	0	—		0	0
Norwich City	Total		0	0	0	0	0	0	0	0	0	0	0	0
Fleetwood Town (loan)	2019–20	League One	2	0	0	0	0	0	0	0	0	0	2	0
St Mirren (loan)	2020–21	Scottish Premiership	2	0	0	0	0	0	0	0	0	0	2	0
ÍA Akranes (loan)	2020	Besta deild karla	7	0	0	0	0	0	—		—		7	0
ÍA Akranes (loan)	2021	Besta deild karla	20	3	5	1	3	1	—		—		28	5
Breiðablik	2022	Besta deild karla	24	14	3	2	4	1	5	3	5	0	41	20
Rosenborg	2023	Eliteserien	18	5	0	0	0	0	3	2	0	0	21	7
Rosenborg	2024	Eliteserien	0	0	0	0	0	0	0	0	0	0	0	0
Rosenborg	2025	Eliteserien	5	0	3	3	0	0	0	0	0	0	8	3
Rosenborg	Total		23	5	3	3	0	0	3	2	0	0	29	10
Breiðablik (loan)	2024	Besta deild karla	22	9	1	0	0	0	4	1	0	0	27	10
Lyngby (loan)	2025–26	Danish 1st Division	25	7	2	0	0	0	0	0	0	0	27	7
Lyngby	2026–27	Danish 1st Division	3	0	0	0	0	0	0	0	0	0	3	0
Career total			127	38	14	6	7	2	12	6	7	0	168	52

== Honours ==
Lyngby

- Danish 1st Division: 2025–26
