= Salino =

- Village
- Location within Poland
- Coordinates: 54°40′42″N 17°55′27″E
- Country: Poland
- Voivodeship: Pomeranian
- County: Wejherowo
- Gmina: Gniewino
- Population: 82
- Website: http://salino.pl/

Salino [saˈlinɔ] (German: Saulin) is a village in the administrative district of Gmina Gniewino, within Wejherowo County, Pomeranian Voivodeship, in northern Poland.

For details of the history of the region, see History of Pomerania.
