= İlkay Durmuş =

Turkish footballer

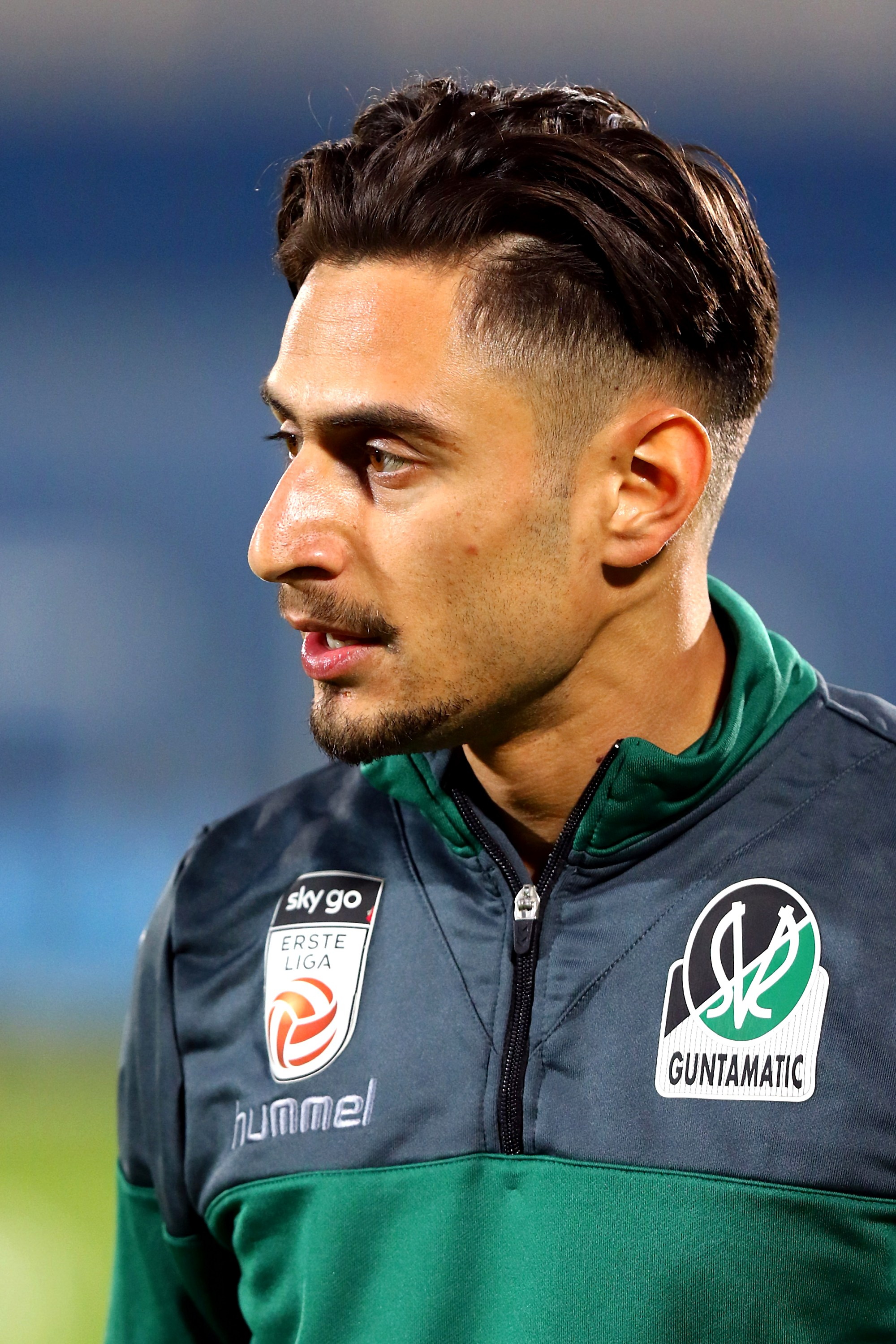
- Durmuş for Wacker Innsbruck in 2018

Personal information
- Full name: İlkay Durmuş
- Date of birth: 1 May 1994 (age 32)
- Place of birth: Stuttgart, Germany
- Height: 1.80 m (5 ft 11 in)
- Positions: Winger; full-back

Team information
- Current team: Polonia Warsaw
- Number: 99

Youth career
- TSG 1899 Hoffenheim
- 2011–2012: VfB Stuttgart

Senior career*
Years	Team	Apps	(Gls)
2012–2014	Gençlerbirliği	1	(0)
2014	Antalyaspor	1	(0)
2015	Floridsdorfer AC	8	(0)
2015–2017	Austria Lustenau	38	(7)
2017–2018	Ried	35	(8)
2018–2019	Wacker Innsbruck	18	(1)
2019–2021	St Mirren	57	(7)
2021–2023	Lechia Gdańsk	58	(7)
2023–2024	Górnik Łęczna	23	(2)
2024–	Polonia Warsaw	58	(7)

International career
2010	Germany U16	1	(0)
2010	Turkey U17	1	(0)
2011	Germany U17	1	(0)
2012	Turkey U18	1	(0)
2012–2013	Turkey U19	16	(0)
2012–2013	Turkey U20	13	(0)
- * Club domestic league appearances and goals as of 15:27, 29 May 2026 (UTC)

İlkay Durmuş (born 1 May 1994) is a professional footballer who plays as a winger or full-back for I liga club Polonia Warsaw. Born in Germany, he represented his country of birth and Turkey as a youth international.

== Club career ==
Durmuş joined Floridsdorfer AC in Austria in January 2015. He made his Süper Lig debut on 18 May 2014.

In July 2019, Durmuş signed a two-year deal with Scottish club St Mirren.

== Career statistics ==
As of match played 28 May 2026

Appearances and goals by club, season and competition
Club	Season	League			National cup (Note: Includes Turkish Cup, Austrian Cup, Scottish Cup, Polish Cup)		League cup (Note: Includes Scottish League Cup)		Continental		Total	
Club	Season	Division	Apps	Goals	Apps	Goals	Apps	Goals	Apps	Goals	Apps	Goals
Gençlerbirliği	2013–14	Süper Lig	0	0	1	0	—		—		1	0
Antalyaspor	2013–14	Süper Lig	1	0	0	0	—		—		1	0
Floridsdorfer AC	2014–15	Austrian 2. Liga	8	0	1	0	—		—		9	0
Austria Lustenau	2015–16	Austrian 2. Liga	15	2	0	0	—		—		15	2
Austria Lustenau	2016–17	Austrian 2. Liga	23	5	2	1	—		—		25	6
Austria Lustenau	Total		38	7	2	1	0	0	0	0	40	8
Ried	2017–18	Austrian 2. Liga	35	8	4	0	—		—		39	8
Wacker Innsbruck	2018–19	Austrian Bundesliga	18	1	1	0	—		—		19	1
St Mirren	2019–20	Scottish Premiership	28	4	4	0	0	0	—		32	4
St Mirren	2020–21	Scottish Premiership	31	3	4	0	4	1	—		39	4
St Mirren	Total		59	7	8	0	4	1	0	0	71	8
Lechia Gdańsk	2021–22	Ekstraklasa	33	6	2	1	—		—		35	7
Lechia Gdańsk	2022–23	Ekstraklasa	25	1	2	1	—		4 (Note: Appearances in UEFA Europa Conference League)	0	31	2
Lechia Gdańsk	Total		58	7	4	2	0	0	4	0	66	9
Górnik Łęczna	2023–24	I liga	23 (Note: Includes one appearance in I liga promotion play-offs)	2	0	0	—		—		23	2
Polonia Warsaw	2024–25	I liga	28	2	3	3	—		—		31	5
Polonia Warsaw	2025–26	I liga	30 (Note: Includes one appearance and one goal in I liga promotion play-offs)	5	1	0	—		—		31	5
Polonia Warsaw	Total		58	7	4	3	—		—		62	10
Career total			298	39	25	6	4	1	4	0	331	46
