= Bychówko =

- Settlement
- Location within Poland
- Coordinates: 54°45′4″N 17°58′35″E
- Country: Poland
- Voivodeship: Pomeranian
- County: Wejherowo
- Gmina: Gniewino

Bychówko [bɨˈxufkɔ] is a settlement in the administrative district of Gmina Gniewino, within Wejherowo County, Pomeranian Voivodeship, in northern Poland.

For details of the history of the region, see History of Pomerania.
