= Strzebielinko =

- Village
- Location within Poland
- Coordinates: 54°43′47″N 18°2′5″E
- Country: Poland
- Voivodeship: Pomeranian
- County: Wejherowo
- Gmina: Gniewino
- Population: 174

Strzebielinko [stʂɛbjɛˈlinkɔ] is a village in the administrative district of Gmina Gniewino, within Wejherowo County, Pomeranian Voivodeship, in northern Poland.

For details of the history of the region, see History of Pomerania.
