= Nadole, Pomeranian Voivodeship =

Nadole
- Village
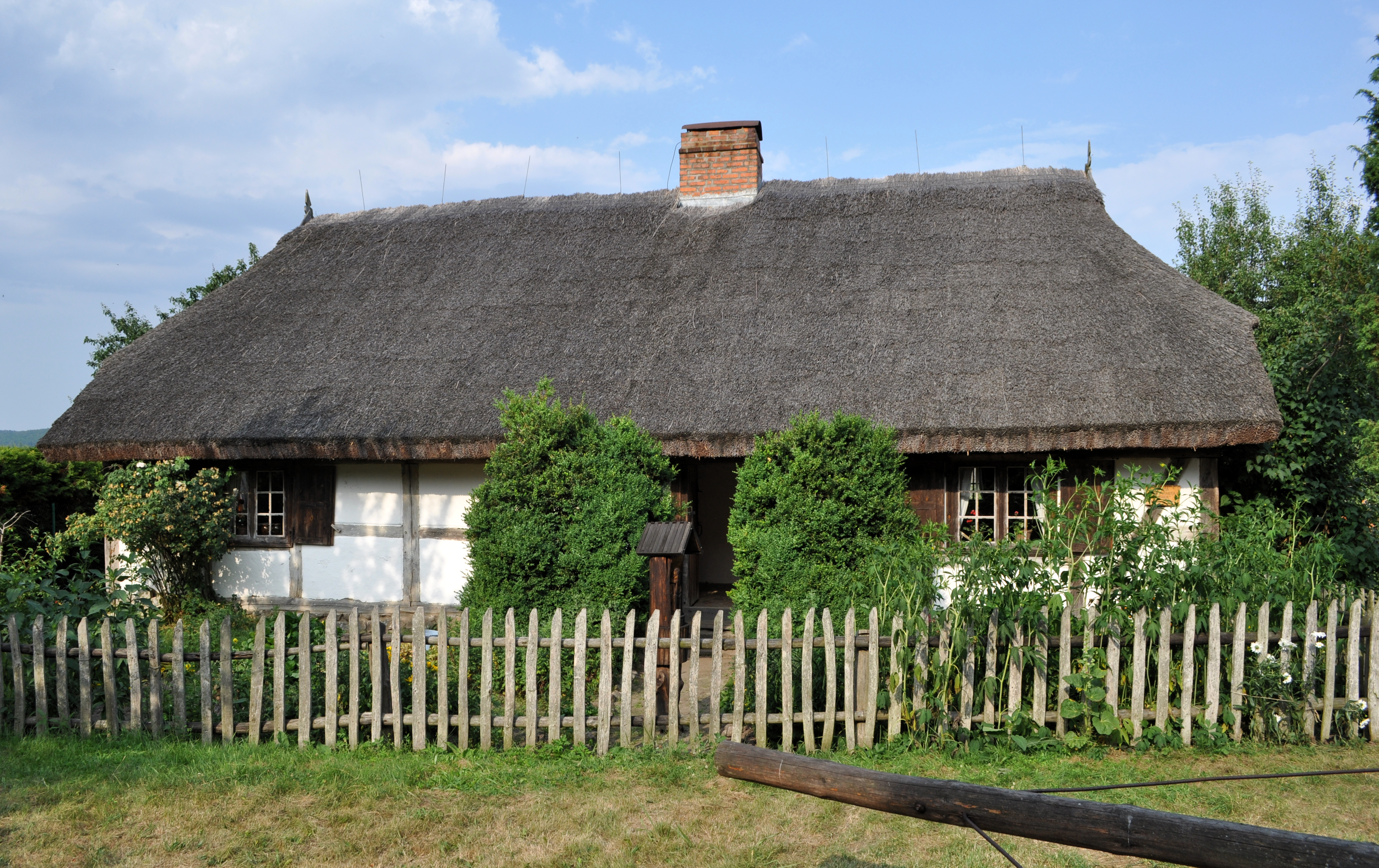
- Open-air museum in Nadole

- Location within Poland
- Coordinates: 54°44′43″N 18°3′7″E
- Country: Poland
- Voivodeship: Pomeranian
- County: Wejherowo
- Gmina: Gniewino
- Population: 205

Nadole [naˈdɔlɛ] is a village in the administrative district of Gmina Gniewino, within Wejherowo County, Pomeranian Voivodeship, in northern Poland. There are in this village the Peasant and Fisherman's Farmsteads. For details of the history of the region, see History of Pomerania.
