= Kolkowo =

- Village
- Location within Poland
- Coordinates: 54°42′50″N 18°3′13″E
- Country: Poland
- Voivodeship: Pomeranian
- County: Wejherowo
- Gmina: Gniewino
- Population: 0

Kolkowo [kɔlˈkɔvɔ] (German: Kolkau) is a former village in the administrative district of Gmina Gniewino, within Wejherowo County, Pomeranian Voivodeship, in northern Poland.

For details of the history of the region, see History of Pomerania.
