= Rybska Karczma =

- Settlement
- Location within Poland
- Coordinates: 54°39′53″N 18°5′29″E
- Country: Poland
- Voivodeship: Pomeranian
- County: Wejherowo
- Gmina: Gniewino

Rybska Karczma [ˈrɨpska ˈkart͡ʂma] is a settlement in the administrative district of Gmina Gniewino, within Wejherowo County, Pomeranian Voivodeship, in northern Poland.

For details of the history of the region, see History of Pomerania.
