= Chynowie =

Village in Kashubia

Chynowie Chinowié
- Village
- Location within Poland
- Coordinates: 54°38′20″N 18°0′41″E
- Country: Poland
- Voivodeship: Pomeranian
- County: Wejherowo
- Gmina: Gniewino
- Population: 516

Chynowie [xɨˈnɔvjɛ] (Kashubian: Chinowié) is a village in the administrative district of Gmina Gniewino, within Wejherowo County, Pomeranian Voivodeship, in northern Poland.
