= Dąbrówka, Gmina Gniewino =

Dąbrówka
- Village
- Location within Poland
- Coordinates: 54°39′39″N 17°57′57″E
- Country: Poland
- Voivodeship: Pomeranian
- County: Wejherowo
- Gmina: Gniewino
- Population: 70

Dąbrówka [dɔmˈbrufka] is a village in the administrative district of Gmina Gniewino, within Wejherowo County, Pomeranian Voivodeship, in northern Poland.

For details of the history of the region, see History of Pomerania.

It is the primary base of the Spichlerz association - a group specialised in Obstacle Course Racing (OCR) founded by Grzegorz Kropidłowski who is known all over Poland as a previous participant of the Ninja Warrior Poland.
