= Dębina, Wejherowo County =

Village in Kashubia

Dębina Dãbino
- Village
- Location within Poland
- Coordinates: 54°40′44″N 17°53′30″E
- Country: Poland
- Voivodeship: Pomeranian
- County: Wejherowo
- Gmina: Gniewino
- Population: 41

Dębina [dɛmˈbina] (Kashubian: Dãbino) is a village in the administrative district of Gmina Gniewino, within Wejherowo County, Pomeranian Voivodeship, in northern Poland.

For details of the history of the region, see History of Pomerania.
