= Dylan Connolly =

Irish professional association footballer

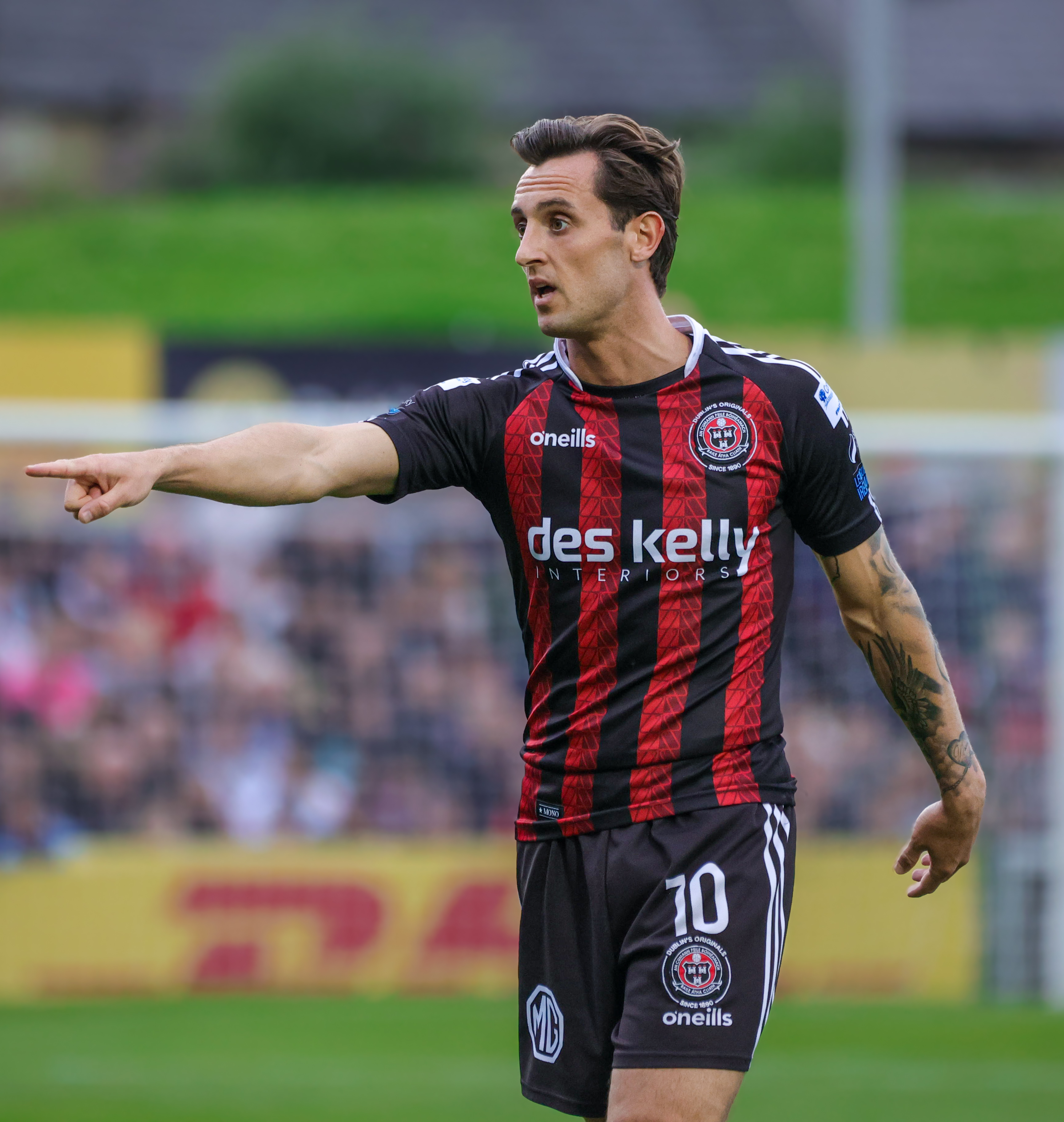

Personal information
- Full name: Dylan Edward Connolly
- Date of birth: 2 May 1995 (age 31)
- Place of birth: Dublin, Ireland
- Height: 1.76 m (5 ft 9 in)
- Position: Winger

Youth career
- Johnstown
- 2012: Bohemians

Senior career*
Years	Team	Apps	(Gls)
2012	Bohemians	1	(0)
2013–2014	Shelbourne	29	(13)
2014–2016	Ipswich Town	0	(0)
2016–2017	Bray Wanderers	50	(10)
2017–2019	Dundalk	37	(8)
2019–2020	AFC Wimbledon	15	(0)
2019–2020	→ Bradford City (loan)	27	(1)
2020–2021	St Mirren	28	(6)
2021–2022	Northampton Town	17	(0)
2022–2023	Morecambe	35	(1)
2023–2024	Bohemians	47	(0)
2024–2026	Glentoran	45	(3)
2026	Galway United	10	(0)

International career^{‡}
2014	Republic of Ireland U17	3	(0)
2017	Republic of Ireland U21	15	(2)
- * Club domestic league appearances and goals as of 22:16, 4 November 2026 ‡ National team caps and goals as of 12 January 2024

Dylan Edward Connolly (born 2 May 1995) is an Irish professional footballer who plays as a winger, most recently for League of Ireland Premier Division club Galway United.

== Career ==
=== Early career ===
After playing for Bohemians, Shelbourne, Ipswich Town and Bray Wanderers, Connolly signed for Dundalk on a 2 1/2-year deal in June 2017.

=== AFC Wimbledon ===
On 3 January 2019, Connolly signed for AFC Wimbledon from Dundalk for an undisclosed fee. He was released at the end of the 2019–20 season following the end of his contract.

==== Bradford City (loan) ====
He signed on loan for Bradford City in September 2019. His loan expired on 1 May 2020.

=== St Mirren ===
On 25 August 2020, Connolly joined Scottish Premiership side St Mirren. At the end of the 2020–21, Connolly was offered a new contract with the club.

=== Northampton Town ===
Despite being offered a new contract to stay in Scotland, on 15 June 2021 it was announced that Connolly had agreed a deal to join League Two side Northampton Town upon the expiration of his contract with St Mirren, signing a two-year contract at Sixfields Stadium.

=== Morecambe ===
On 31 January 2022, Connolly joined League One side Morecambe on a deal until the end of the 2022–23 season. On 8 January 2023, it was announced that his contract had been cancelled by mutual consent after scoring 1 goal in his 43 appearances for the club in all competitions.

=== Bohemians ===
On 9 January 2023, it was announced that Connolly had signed for his first senior club Bohemians, returning to the League of Ireland Premier Division.

=== Glentoran ===
Connolly signed for NIFL Premiership club Glentoran for an undisclosed fee on 18 July 2024.

=== Galway United ===
On 2 July 2026, Connolly rturned to the League of Ireland signing for Premier Division club Galway United on a short term deal until the end of the season. On 4 November it was announced that Connolly would be leaving the club following the end of his contract, after making 13 appearances in all competitions.

== Career statistics ==
As of match played on 23 October 2026

Appearances and goals by club, season and competition
Club	Season	League			National Cup		League Cup		Europe		Other		Total	
Club	Season	Division	Apps	Goals	Apps	Goals	Apps	Goals	Apps	Goals	Apps	Goals	Apps	Goals
Bohemians	2012	LOI Premier Division	1	0	0	0	0	0	0	0	0	0	1	0
Shelbourne	2013	LOI Premier Division	5	0	0	0	0	0	—		0	0	5	0
Shelbourne	2014	LOI First Division	24	13	3	0	0	0	—		1 (Note: Appearances in League of Ireland promotion/relegation playoffs)	0	28	13
Shelbourne	Total		29	13	3	0	0	0	—		1	0	33	13
Ipswich Town	2014–15	EFL Championship	0	0	0	0	0	0	—		—		0	0
Ipswich Town	2015–16	EFL Championship	0	0	0	0	0	0	—		—		0	0
Ipswich Town	Total		0	0	0	0	0	0	—		—		0	0
Bray Wanderers	2016	LOI Premier Division	31	5	1	0	3	2	—		0	0	35	7
Bray Wanderers	2017	LOI Premier Division	19	5	—		1	0	—		1 (Note: Appearances in Leinster Senior Cup)	0	21	5
Bray Wanderers	Total		50	10	1	0	4	2	—		1	0	56	12
Dundalk	2017	LOI Premier Division	9	1	5	1	—		1 (Note: Appearances in UEFA Champions League)	0	0	0	15	2
Dundalk	2018	LOI Premier Division	28	4	2	0	3	2	4 (Note: Appearances in UEFA Europa League)	1	1 (Note: Appearances in President's Cup)	0	38	7
Dundalk	Total		37	5	7	1	3	2	5	1	1	0	53	9
AFC Wimbledon	2018–19	EFL League One	12	0	2	0	—		—		—		14	0
AFC Wimbledon	2019–20	EFL League One	3	0	—		1	0	—		0	0	4	0
AFC Wimbledon	Total		15	0	2	0	1	0	—		0	0	18	0
Bradford City (loan)	2019–20	EFL League Two	27	1	2	0	—		—		0	0	29	1
St Mirren	2020–21	Scottish Premiership	28	2	3	0	7	1	—		—		38	3
Northampton Town	2021–22	EFL League Two	17	0	2	0	2	0	—		2 (Note: Appearance(s) in the EFL Trophy.)	1	23	1
Morecambe	2021–22	EFL League One	15	1	—		—		—		—		15	1
Morecambe	2022–23	EFL League One	20	0	1	0	3	0	—		4	0	28	0
Morecambe	Total		35	1	1	0	3	0	—		4	0	43	1
Bohemians	2023	LOI Premier Division	28	0	4	1	—		—		1	0	33	1
Bohemians	2024	LOI Premier Division	19	0	—		—		—		0	0	19	0
Bohemians	Total		47	0	4	1	—		—		1	0	52	1
Glentoran	2024–25	NIFL Premiership	32	3	2	0	4	0	—		—		38	3
Glentoran	2025–26	NIFL Premiership	11	0	2	0	2	0	—		1 (Note: Appearance in the County Antrim Shield)	0	16	0
Glentoran	Total		43	3	4	0	6	0	—		1	0	54	3
Galway United	2026	LOI Premier Division	10	0	3	0	—		—		—		13	0
Career total			339	34	32	2	26	5	5	1	11	1	413	42

== Honours ==
Glentoran

- County Antrim Shield: 2024–25

Individual

- PFAI Team of the Year: 2014 First Division
