= Rybno, Pomeranian Voivodeship =

Rybno
- Village
- Location within Poland
- Coordinates: 54°41′2″N 18°5′6″E
- Country: Poland
- Voivodeship: Pomeranian
- County: Wejherowo
- Gmina: Gniewino
- Population: 510

Rybno [ˈrɨbnɔ] (German: Rieben) is a village in the administrative district of Gmina Gniewino, within Wejherowo County, Pomeranian Voivodeship, in northern Poland.

For details of the history of the region, see History of Pomerania.
