= 2020–21 St Mirren F.C. season =

St Mirren
2020–21 season
- Chairman: Gordon Scott
- Manager: Jim Goodwin
- Stadium: St Mirren Park
- Premiership: 7th
- League Cup: Semi-finals
- Scottish Cup: Semi-finals
- Top goalscorer: League: Jamie McGrath (10); All: Jamie McGrath (17)
Home colours	Away colours

The 2020–21 season was the club's third consecutive season in the top tier of Scottish football since being promoted from the Scottish Championship at the end of the 2017–18 season. St Mirren also competed in the League Cup and the Scottish Cup.

== Month by month review ==
=== June ===
- 2 June – the club announced that 13 players will leave the club when their contracts shortly expire. Captain Stephen McGinn, Václav Hladký, Gary MacKenzie, Oan Djorkaeff, Ross Wallace, Tony Andreu, Danny Mullen and Cody Cooke won't have their contractors renewed – while loanees Lee Hodson, Calum Waters, Akin Famewo, Seifedin Chabbi and Alex Jakubiak all return to their parent clubs.
- 8 June – midfielder Ryan Flynn signed a one-year extension to his contract.
- 18 June – defender Richard Tait signed from Motherwell on a two-year deal.
- 22 June – Rangers goalkeeper Jak Alnwick signed on a two-year deal, after being released by his former club.

=== July ===
- 7 July – Fleetwood Town midfielder Nathan Sheron joined the club on a season long loan.
- 20 July – defender Joe Shaughnessy signed on a two-year deal from Southend United, and Icelandic midfielder Ísak Þorvaldsson joined the club on a season long loan from Norwich City.
- 28 July – Ex-Ross County defender Marcus Fraser signed a one-year deal with the club.

== Squad list ==
As of 16 May 2021

No.	Name	Nationality	Position	Date of Birth (Age)	Signed From	Signed in	Signed until	Apps.	Goals
Goalkeepers
1	Jak Alnwick	(England)	GK	17 June 1993 (age 33)	Rangers	2020	2022	45	0
26	Dean Lyness	(England)	GK	20 July 1991 (age 35)	Raith Rovers	2019	2021	5	0
27	Peter Urminský	(Slovakia)	GK	24 May 1999 (age 27)	Spartak Trnava	2020	2021	0	0
28	Jamie Langfield	(Scotland)	GK	22 December 1979 (age 46)	Aberdeen	2015	2021	0	0
29	Zdeněk Zlámal	(Czech Republic)	GK	5 November 1985 (age 40)	Heart of Midlothian	2020	2021	3	0
Defenders
2	Richard Tait	(Scotland)	DF	2 December 1989 (age 36)	Motherwell	2020	2022	43	2
3	Brandon Mason	(England)	DF	30 September 1997 (age 28)	Coventry City	2020	2021	12	0
4	Joe Shaughnessy	(Republic of Ireland)	DF	6 July 1992 (age 34)	Southend United	2020	2022	41	2
5	Conor McCarthy	(Republic of Ireland)	DF	11 April 1998 (age 28)	Cork City	2020	2022	55	3
15	Jack Baird	(Scotland)	DF	7 February 1996 (age 30)	St Mirren Youth Team	2014	2021	166	6
15	Daniel Finlayson	(Northern Ireland)	DF	19 January 2001 (age 25)	Rangers	2020	2021	2	0
22	Marcus Fraser	(Scotland)	DF	23 June 1994 (age 32)	Ross County	2020	2021	46	3
Midfielders
6	Nathan Sheron	(England)	MF	4 October 1997 (age 28)	Fleetwood Town (loan)	2020	2021	9	0
7	Kyle Magennis	(Scotland)	MF	26 August 1998 (age 28)	St Mirren Youth Team	2016	2021	107	8
7	Jake Doyle-Hayes	(Republic of Ireland)	MF	30 December 1998 (age 27)	Aston Villa	2020	2021	28	1
8	Ryan Flynn	(Scotland)	MF	4 September 1988 (age 38)	Oldham Athletic	2018	2021	89	2
10	Kyle McAllister	(Scotland)	MF	26 May 1997 (age 29)	Derby County	2019	2022	93	4
11	İlkay Durmuş	(Turkey)	MF	1 May 1994 (age 32)	Wacker Innsbruck	2019	2021	68	8
14	Cameron MacPherson	(Scotland)	MF	29 December 1998 (age 27)	St Mirren Youth Team	2015	2022	84	5
16	Sam Foley	(Republic of Ireland)	MF	17 October 1986 (age 39)	Northampton Town	2019	2021	43	2
17	Jamie McGrath	(Republic of Ireland)	MF	30 September 1996 (age 29)	Dundalk	2020	2022	52	17
19	Dylan Reid	(Scotland)	MF	1 March 2005 (age 21)	St Mirren Youth Team	2021	2021	1	0
21	Dylan Connolly	(Republic of Ireland)	MF	2 May 1995 (age 31)	AFC Wimbledon	2020	2021	38	2
23	Ísak Þorvaldsson	(Iceland)	MF	1 May 2001 (age 25)	Norwich City (loan)	2020	2021	2	0
25	Ethan Erhahon	(Scotland)	MF	9 May 2001 (age 25)	St Mirren Youth Team	2017	2022	62	2
30	Jay Henderson	(Scotland)	MF	21 February 2002 (age 24)	St Mirren Youth Team	2021	2021	7	0
Forwards
9	Jonathan Obika	(England)	FW	12 September 1990 (age 36)	Oxford United	2019	2021	74	19
19	Junior Morias	(Jamaica)	FW	4 July 1995 (age 31)	Northampton Town	2019	2021	41	2
20	Kristian Dennis	(England)	FW	11 March 1990 (age 36)	Notts County	2020	2022	24	5
23	Lee Erwin	(Scotland)	FW	19 March 1994 (age 32)	Ross County	2020	2022	35	3
33	Lewis Jamieson	(Scotland)	FW	17 April 2002 (age 24)	St Mirren Youth Team	2020	2021	3	0
29	Eamonn Brophy	(Scotland)	FW	10 March 1996 (age 30)	Kilmarnock	2021	2021	8	0
45	Collin Quaner	(Germany)	FW	18 June 1991 (age 35)	Huddersfield Town	2021	2021	8	1

== Results & fixtures ==
Win Draw Loss Postponed

=== Pre season / Friendlies ===
11 July 2020 Friendly	Hibernian	1 – 1	St Mirren	Hibernian Training Centre
	Gullan		Jay Henderson

18 July 2020 Friendly	Hamilton Academical	2 – 1	St Mirren	New Douglas Park
	Moyo 1'; Smith 31'		Obika	Attendance: 0

2 September 2020 Friendly	St Mirren	1 – 2	Heart of Midlothian	St Mirren Park
	McAllister 57'	Report	Roberts 33'; Walker 43'	Attendance: 0

=== Scottish Premiership ===
1 August 2020 1	St Mirren	1 – 0	Livingston	St Mirren Park
15:00	Tait 30'	BBC Report		Attendance: 0 Referee: Don Robertson

9 August 2020 2	Rangers	3 – 0	St Mirren	Ibrox Stadium
15:00	McCarthy 23' (o.g.); Morelos 69', 74'	BBC Report		Attendance: 0 Referee: Andrew Dallas

15 August 2020 3	Hamilton Academical	0 – 1	St Mirren	New Douglas Park
15:00		BBC Report	Obika 19'	Attendance: 0 Referee: Steven Kirkland

22 August 2020 4	St Mirren	1 – 1	Ross County	St Mirren Park
15:00	Obika 14'; Shaughnessy (red card) 62'	BBC Report	Sheron 70' (o.g.)	Attendance: 0 Referee: Mike Roncone

29 August 2020 5	St Johnstone	1 – 0	St Mirren	McDiarmid Park
15:00	May 72'	BBC Report		Attendance: 0 Referee: Kevin Clancy

12 September 2020 6	St Mirren	0 – 3	Hibernian	St Mirren Park
15:00		BBC Report	Nisbet 14'; Newell 17'; Boyle 59'	Attendance: 0 Referee: Willie Collum

16 September 2020 7	St Mirren	1 – 2	Celtic	St Mirren Park
19:45	Erwin 3'	BBC Report	Duffy 21'; Forrest 36'	Attendance: 0

19 September 2020 8	Dundee United	2 – 1	St Mirren	Tannadice Park
15:00	Shankland 33'; Sporle 52'	BBC Report	Connolly 64'	Attendance: 0 Referee: Colin Steven

26 September 2020 9	St Mirren	0 – 1	Kilmarnock	St Mirren Park
15:00		BBC Report	Kabamba 28'	Attendance: 0 Referee: Darren Munro

2 October 2020 10	Aberdeen	2 – 1	St Mirren	Pittodrie Stadium
19:45	Watkins 71'; Ferguson 90+1'	BBC Report	Erhahon 54'	Attendance: 0 Referee: Gavin Duncan

6 November 2020 13	St Mirren	0 – 0	Dundee United	St Mirren Park
19:45		BBC Report		Attendance: 0 Referee: David Munro

21 November 2020 14	Livingston	0 – 1	St Mirren	Almondvale
15:00		BBC Report	Doyle-Hayes 56'	Attendance: 0 Referee: Willie Collum

5 December 2020 15	St Mirren	1 – 1	Aberdeen	St Mirren Park
15:00	McGrath 44' (pen.)	BBC Report	Hayes 37'; Ferguson (red card) 51'	Attendance: 0 Referee: Bobby Madden

12 December 2020 16	Motherwell	0 – 1	St Mirren	Fir Park
15:00		BBC Report	McGrath 13'	Attendance: 0 Referee: Euan Anderson

19 December 2020 17	St Mirren	3 – 2	St Johnstone	St Mirren Park
15:00	Erhahon 38'; Erwin 82'; Obika 87'	BBC Report	May 22' (pen.); Tanser 44'; Kerr (red card) 45'	Attendance: 0 Referee: Steven McLean

23 December 2020 18	Hibernian	1 – 0	St Mirren	Easter Road
18:00	Nisbet 18'; Doidge (red card) 88'	BBC Report	Mason (red card) 83'	Attendance: 0 Referee: Steven Kirkland

26 December 2020 19	Ross County	0 – 2	St Mirren	Victoria Park
18:00	Reid (red card) 36'; Draper (red card) 60'	BBC Report	Fraser 76'; Dennis 85'	Attendance: 0 Referee: Colin Steven

30 December 2020 20	St Mirren	0 – 2	Rangers	St Mirren Park
15:00		BBC Report	Roofe 27'; Morelos 33'	Attendance: 0 Referee: Alan Muir

2 January 2021 21	Kilmarnock	1 – 1	St Mirren	Rugby Park
15:00	Whitehall 12'	BBC Report	Rogers 90' (o.g.)	Attendance: 0 Referee: Craig Napier

9 January 2021 22	St Mirren	1 – 1	Motherwell	St Mirren Park
15:00	McGrath 79' (pen.)	BBC Report	Cole 27'	Attendance: 0 Referee: Bobby Madden

16 January 2021 23	St Johnstone	1 – 0	St Mirren	McDiarmid Park
15:00	Kane 46'	BBC Report	MacPherson (red card) 55'	Attendance: 0 Referee: Steven McLean

27 January 2021 24	Dundee United	1 – 5	St Mirren	Tannadice Park
19:45	Harkes 54'	BBC Report	Shaughnessy 30'; McGrath 42' (pen.), 45+1' (pen.); Connolly 80'; Dennis 85'	Attendance: 0 Referee: Steven McLean

30 January 2021 25	Celtic	1 – 2	St Mirren	Celtic Park
15:00	Édouard 32'	BBC Report	Dennis 18'; Durmuş 37'	Attendance: 0 Referee: Bobby Madden

2 February 2021 26	St Mirren	1 – 2	Hibernian	St Mirren Park
19:45	Alnwick (red card) 36'; Obika 74'	BBC Report	Porteous 55'; Boyle 71' (pen.)	Attendance: 0 Referee: Alan Muir

6 February 2021 27	St Mirren	2 – 0	Kilmarnock	St Mirren Park
15:00	McAllister 38'; Obika 61'	BBC Report		Attendance: 0 Referee: John Beaton

10 February 2021 28	St Mirren	0 – 4	Celtic	St Mirren Park
20:00		BBC Report	Rogic 16'; Édouard 79' (pen.); Christie 82'; Turnbull 83'	Attendance: 0 Referee: Don Robertson

13 February 2021 29	Aberdeen	0 – 0	St Mirren	Pittodrie
15:00		BBC Report		Attendance: 0 Referee: Euan Anderson

17 February 2021 12 (Note: Rearranged match after postponement)	St Mirren	1 – 1	Hamilton Academical	St Mirren Park
18:00	Durmuş 53'	BBC Report	Anderson 68'	Attendance: 0 Referee: Steven McLean

20 February 2021 30	St Mirren	1 – 1	Livingston	St Mirren Park
15:00	MacPherson 32'	BBC Report	McCarthy 8' (o.g.)	Attendance: 0 Referee: Willie Collum

24 February 2021 11	St Mirren	0 – 0	Motherwell	St Mirren Park
18:00		BBC Report		Attendance: 0 Referee: Kevin Clancy

27 February 2021 31	St Mirren	1 – 0	Ross County	St Mirren Park
15:00	McGrath 82' (pen.)	BBC Report		Attendance: 0 Referee: Greg Aitken

6 March 2021 32	Rangers	3 – 0	St Mirren	Ibrox Stadium
15:00	Kent 14'; Morelos 16'; Hagi 46'	BBC Report		Attendance: 0 Referee: Steven McLean

20 March 2021 33	Hamilton Academical	1 – 1	St Mirren	New Douglas Park
15:00	Munro 89'	BBC Report	McGrath 33' (pen.)	Attendance: 0 Referee: Don Robertson

10 April 2021 34	Motherwell	1 – 0	St Mirren	Fir Park
15:00	Cole 62'	BBC Report		Attendance: 0 Referee: Kevin Clancy

21 April 2021 35	Ross County	1 – 3	St Mirren	Victoria Park
19:45	White 18'	BBC Report	Erwin 50'; Durmuş 71'; McGrath 90+2' (pen.)	Attendance: 0 Referee: Bobby Madden

1 May 2021 36	St Mirren	1 – 2	Hamilton Academical	St Mirren Park
15:00	McGrath 71'	BBC Report	Callachan 28'; Moyo 57'	Attendance: 0 Referee: John Beaton

12 May 2021 37	Kilmarnock	3 – 3	St Mirren	Rugby Park
19:45	Lafferty 8', 61'; Kiltie 81'	BBC Report	McGrath 63'; MacPherson 78'; Quaner 83'	Attendance: 0 Referee: David Munro

16 May 2021 38	St Mirren	0 – 0	Dundee United	St Mirren Park
12:00		BBC Report		Attendance: 0 Referee: Euan Anderson

=== Scottish League Cup ===
==== Group stage ====
7 October 2020 1	St Mirren	4 – 1	Partick Thistle	St Mirren Park
19:45	Tait 45+1'; Obika 74'; Breen 81' (o.g.); Connolly 82'	BBC Report	Spittal 66'	Attendance: 0 Referee: Colin Steven

10 October 2020 2	Queen of the South	2 – 2 (2 – 4 p)	St Mirren	Palmerston Park
15:00	Shields 8'; Fitzpatrick 12'	BBC Report	McGrath 53'; Fraser 89'	Attendance: 0

11 November 2020 3	St Mirren	1 – 1 (6 – 5 p)	Greenock Morton	St Mirren Park
19:45	Obika 39'	BBC Report	MacIver 60'	Attendance: 0 Referee: Bobby Madden

14 November 2020 4	Queen's Park	0 – 1	St Mirren	Hampden Park
15:00		BBC Report	Shaughnessy (red card) 49'; Obika 81'	Attendance: 0 Referee: Greg Aitken

==== Knockout round ====
28 November 2020 Second round	St Mirren	2 – 1	Aberdeen	St Mirren Park
17:15	Durmuş 4'; McGrath 88'	BBC Report	McGinn 43'	Attendance: 0 Referee: Don Robertson

16 December 2020 Quarter-Final	St Mirren	3 – 2	Rangers	St Mirren Park
20:00	McGrath 40' (pen.), 53'; McCarthy 90+2'	BBC Report	Goldson 7'; Davis 88'	Attendance: 0 Referee: Andrew Dallas

24 January 2021 Semi-Final	Livingston	1 – 0	St Mirren	Hampden Park
16:00	Robinson 10'	BBC Report		Attendance: 0 Referee: David Munro

=== Scottish Cup ===
3 April 2021 Third round	Hamilton Academical	0 – 3	St Mirren	New Douglas Park
15:00			McGrath 4', 79' (pen.); Dennis 74'	Attendance: 0 Referee: Euan Anderson

17 April 2021 Fourth round	St Mirren	2 – 1	Inverness CT	St Mirren Park
15:00	Dennis 50'; Fraser 89'	Report	Todorov 48'	Attendance: 0 Referee: John Beaton

26 April 2021 Quarter-Final	Kilmarnock	3 – 3 (a.e.t.) (4 – 5 p)	St Mirren	Rugby Park
19:45	Rossi 37'; Kiltie 44'; Millen 101' (pen.)	Report	Doyle 25' (o.g.); Shaughnessy 84'; McGrath 119' (pen.)	Attendance: 0 Referee: Don Robertson

9 May 2021 Semi-Final	St Mirren	1 – 2	St Johnstone	Hampden Park
14:15	McCarthy 86'	Report	Kane 72'; Middleton 74'	Attendance: 0 Referee: Willie Collum

== Player statistics ==
=== Appearances and goals ===
As of 16 May 2021

No.	Pos	Player	Premiership		League Cup		Scottish Cup		Total	
No.	Pos	Player	Apps	Goals	Apps	Goals	Apps	Goals	Apps	Goals
1	GK	(England) Jak Alnwick	34+0	0	7+0	0	4+0	0	45	0
2	DF	(Scotland) Richard Tait	31+2	1	7+0	1	2+1	0	43	2
3	DF	(England) Brandon Mason	5+2	0	3+1	0	0+1	0	12	0
4	DF	(Republic of Ireland) Joe Shaughnessy	33+0	1	6+0	0	4+0	1	43	2
5	DF	(Republic of Ireland) Conor McCarthy	37+0	0	5+0	1	4+0	1	46	2
7	MF	(Republic of Ireland) Jake Doyle-Hayes	21+1	1	3+1	0	3+0	0	29	1
8	MF	(Scotland) Ryan Flynn	8+6	0	0+1	0	1+1	0	17	0
9	FW	(England) Jonathan Obika	26+10	5	4+3	3	2+0	0	45	8
10	MF	(Scotland) Kyle McAllister	11+23	0	2+4	0	1+1	0	42	0
11	MF	(Turkey) İlkay Durmuş	23+7	3	2+2	1	4+0	0	38	4
14	MF	(Scotland) Cameron MacPherson	14+17	2	3+2	0	0+2	0	38	2
15	DF	(Northern Ireland) Daniel Finlayson	2+1	0	0+0	0	0+0	0	3	0
17	MF	(Republic of Ireland) Jamie McGrath	34+1	10	6+1	4	4+0	3	46	17
19	MF	(Scotland) Dylan Reid	0+1	0	0+0	0	0+0	0	1	0
20	FW	(England) Kristian Dennis	6+11	3	1+2	0	3+1	2	24	5
21	MF	(Republic of Ireland) Dylan Connolly	17+11	2	4+3	1	2+1	0	38	3
22	DF	(Scotland) Marcus Fraser	35+0	1	7+0	1	4+0	1	46	3
23	FW	(Scotland) Lee Erwin	16+11	3	2+3	0	3+0	0	35	3
25	MF	(Scotland) Ethan Erhahon	26+3	1	5+0	0	2+1	0	37	1
26	GK	(England) Dean Lyness	1+1	0	0+0	0	0+0	0	2	0
27	GK	(Slovakia) Peter Urminský	0+0	0	0+0	0	0+0	0	0	0
28	GK	(Scotland) Jamie Langfield	0+0	0	0+0	0	0+0	0	0	0
29	FW	(Scotland) Eamonn Brophy	4+2	0	1+0	0	0+1	0	8	0
30	MF	(Scotland) Jay Henderson	4+1	0	0+0	0	1+1	0	7	0
33	FW	(Scotland) Lewis Jamieson	0+1	0	0+1	0	0+0	0	2	0
45	FW	(Germany) Collin Quaner	2+4	1	0+0	0	0+2	0	8	1
Players who left the club during the 2020–21 season
6	MF	(England) Nathan Sheron	5+1	0	2+0	0	0+0	0	8	0
7	MF	(Scotland) Kyle Magennis	0+0	0	0+0	0	0+0	0	0	0
15	DF	(Scotland) Jack Baird	0+0	0	0+0	0	0+0	0	0	0
16	MF	(Republic of Ireland) Sam Foley	10+1	0	3+1	0	0+0	0	15	0
19	FW	(Jamaica) Junior Morias	3+6	0	1+2	0	0+0	0	12	0
23	MF	(Iceland) Ísak Þorvaldsson	0+2	0	0+0	0	0+0	0	2	0
29	GK	(Czech Republic) Zdeněk Zlámal	3+0	0	0+0	0	0+0	0	3	0

=== Goal scorers ===
As of match played 16 May 2020

Place	Position	Nation	Name	Total	Scottish Premiership	Scottish League Cup	Scottish Cup
2	DF	(Scotland)	Richard Tait	2	1	1	
4	DF	(Republic of Ireland)	Joe Shaughnessy	2	1		1
5	DF	(Republic of Ireland)	Conor McCarthy	2		1	1
7	MF	(Republic of Ireland)	Jake Doyle-Hayes	1	1		
9	FW	(England)	Jonathan Obika	8	5	3	
10	MF	(Scotland)	Kyle McAllister	1	1		
11	MF	(Turkey)	İlkay Durmuş	4	3	1	
14	MF	(Scotland)	Cameron MacPherson	2	2		
17	MF	(Republic of Ireland)	Jamie McGrath	17	10	4	3
21	MF	(Republic of Ireland)	Dylan Connolly	3	2	1	
20	FW	(England)	Kristian Dennis	5	3		2
22	DF	(Scotland)	Marcus Fraser	3	1	1	1
23	FW	(Scotland)	Lee Erwin	3	3		
25	DF	(Scotland)	Ethan Erhahon	2	2		
45	FW	(Germany)	Collin Quaner	1	1		
Total				56	36	12	8

=== Disciplinary record ===
Includes all competitive matches.

Last updated 16 May 2020

Number	Nation	Position	Name	Total		Scottish Premiership		League Cup		Scottish Cup	
Number	Nation	Position	Name	Booked	Sent off (straight red)	Booked	Sent off (straight red)	Booked	Sent off (straight red)	Booked	Sent off (straight red)
1	(England)	GK	Jak Alnwick	4	1	3	1			1	
2	(Scotland)	DF	Richard Tait	7	1	5	1	2			
3	(England)	DF	Brandon Mason	1	1	1	1				
4	(Republic of Ireland)	DF	Joe Shaughnessy	7	2	6	1		1	1	
5	(Republic of Ireland)	DF	Conor McCarthy	7	0	6				1	
6	(England)	DF	Nathan Sheron	3	0	3					
7	(Republic of Ireland)	MF	Jake Doyle-Hayes	8	0	4		3		1	
8	(Scotland)	MF	Ryan Flynn	1	0	1					
9	(England)	FW	Jonathan Obika	4	0	3		1			
10	(Scotland)	MF	Kyle McAllister	4	0	3				1	
11	(Turkey)	MF	İlkay Durmuş	1	0	1					
14	(Scotland)	MF	Cameron MacPherson	5	1	3	1	1			
15	(Northern Ireland)	DF	Daniel Finlayson	1	0	1					
16	(Republic of Ireland)	MF	Sam Foley	2	0	2					
17	(Republic of Ireland)	MF	Jamie McGrath	5	0	4		1			
19	(Jamaica)	FW	Junior Morias	1	0	1					
20	(England)	FW	Kristian Dennis	1	0					1	
21	(Republic of Ireland)	MF	Dylan Connolly	2	0	2					
22	(Scotland)	DF	Marcus Fraser	4	0	4					
25	(Scotland)	DF	Ethan Erhahon	9	0	6		2		1	

== Team statistics ==
=== League table ===
Pos	Team	Pld	W	D	L	GF	GA	GD	Pts	Qualification or relegation (Note: Teams play each other three times (33 matches), before the league is split into two groups (the top six and the bottom six).)
1	Rangers (C)	38	32	6	0	92	13	+79	102	Qualification for the Champions League third qualifying round
2	Celtic	38	22	11	5	78	29	+49	77	Qualification for the Champions League second qualifying round
3	Hibernian	38	18	9	11	48	35	+13	63	Qualification for the Europa Conference League second qualifying round
4	Aberdeen	38	15	11	12	36	38	−2	56	Qualification for the Europa Conference League second qualifying round
5	St Johnstone	38	11	12	15	36	46	−10	45	Qualification for the Europa League third qualifying round (Note: St Johnstone qualified as the 2020–21 Scottish Cup winners.)
6	Livingston	38	12	9	17	42	54	−12	45	
7	St Mirren	38	11	12	15	37	45	−8	45	
8	Motherwell	38	12	9	17	39	55	−16	45	
9	Dundee United	38	10	14	14	32	50	−18	44	
10	Ross County	38	11	6	21	35	66	−31	39	
11	Kilmarnock (R)	38	10	6	22	43	54	−11	36	Qualification for the Premiership play-off final
12	Hamilton Academical (R)	38	7	9	22	34	67	−33	30	Relegation to Championship

Rules for classification: 1) Points; 2) Goal difference; 3) Goals scored; 4) Head-to-head points; 5) Head-to-Head goal difference; 6) Play-off (only if deciding champion, UEFA competitions qualification, second stage group allocation or relegation).
(C) Champions; (R) Relegated

=== Division summary ===
Round	1	2	3	4	5	6	7	8	9	10	11	12	13	14	15	16	17	18	19	20	21	22	23	24	25	26	27	28	29	30	31	32	33	34	35	36	37	38
Ground	H	A	A	H	A	H	H	A	H	A	H	A	H	A	H	A	A	H	A	H	A	A	A	H	H	H	A	H	H	H	H	A	A	A	A	H	A	H
Result	W	L	W	D	L	L	L	L	L	L	D	W	D	W	W	L	W	L	D	D	L	W	W	L	W	L	D	D	D	D	W	L	D	L	W	L	D	D
Position	5	6	5	6	6	7	7	9	12	11	11	11	11	11	12	10	8	8	7	7	7	8	8	7	6	6	6	6	7	6	6	6	7	8	7	8	8	7

Updated to match(es) played on 16 May 2021. Source:
A = Away; H = Home; W = Win; D = Draw; L = Loss

=== League results by opponent ===
Team	Result				Points
Team	Home		Away		Points
Aberdeen	1–1	–	1–2	0–0	2/9
Celtic	1–2	0–4	2–1	–	3/9
Dundee United	0–0	0–0	1–2	5–1	5/12
Hamilton Academicals	1–1	1–2	1–0	1–1	5/12
Hibernian	0–3	1–2	0–1	–	0/9
Kilmarnock	0–1	2–0	1–1	3–3	5/12
Livingston	1–0	1–1	1–0	–	7/9
Motherwell	0–0	1–1	1–0	0–1	5/12
Rangers	0–2	–	0–3	0–3	0/9
Ross County	1–1	1–0	2–0	3–1	10/12
St Johnstone	3–2	–	0–1	0–1	3/9

Pos	Team	Pld	W	PW	PL	L	GF	GA	GD	Pts	Qualification	STM	QOS	PAR	GMO	QPK
1	St Mirren	4	2	2	0	0	8	4	+4	10	Qualification for the Second round	—	—	4–1	p1–1	—
2	Queen of the South	4	1	1	2	0	7	5	+2	7		2–2p	—	0–0p	—	—
3	Partick Thistle	4	1	2	0	1	3	4	−1	7		—	—	—	p0–0	2–0
4	Greenock Morton	4	1	0	3	0	4	3	+1	6		—	2–2p	—	—	1–0
5	Queen's Park	4	0	0	0	4	1	7	−6	0		0–1	1–3	—	—	—

Rules for classification: 1) points, 2) goal difference, 3) goals scored, 4) away goals scored, 5) matches won, 6) away matches won, 7) drawing of lots.

=== Management statistics ===
Last updated on 16 May 2020

Name	From	To	P	W	D	L	Win% (Note: Win% is the percentage of matches won rounded to two decimal places.)
Jim Goodwin	12 September 2019	Present	88	27	25	36	30.68

== Transfers ==
=== Players in ===
Position	Nationality	Name	From	Transfer Window	Ends	Fee	Source
DF	(Scotland)	Richard Tait	Motherwell	Summer	2022	Free	
GK	(England)	Jak Alnwick	Rangers	Summer	2022	Free	
MF	(England)	Nathan Sheron	Fleetwood Town	Summer	2021	Loan	
DF	(Republic of Ireland)	Joe Shaughnessy	Southend United	Summer	2022	Free	
MF	(Iceland)	Ísak Þorvaldsson	Norwich City	Summer	2021	Loan	
DF	(Scotland)	Marcus Fraser	Ross County	Summer	2021	Free	
FW	(England)	Kristian Dennis	Notts County	Summer	2022	Free	
MF	(Republic of Ireland)	Dylan Connolly	AFC Wimbledon	Summer	2021	Free	
GK	(Czech Republic)	Zdeněk Zlámal	Heart of Midlothian	Summer	2021	Loan	
DF	(Northern Ireland)	Daniel Finlayson	Rangers	Summer	2021	Loan	
DF	(England)	Brandon Mason	Coventry City	Summer	2021	Loan	
MF	(Republic of Ireland)	Jake Doyle-Hayes	Unattached	Summer	2021	Free	
FW	(Germany)	Collin Quaner	Unattached	Winter	2021	Free	
FW	(Scotland)	Eamonn Brophy	Kilmarnock	Winter	2021	Loan	

=== Players out ===
Position	Nationality	Name	To / Type	Transfer Window	Fee	Source
MF	(France)	Oan Djorkaeff	SC Kriens	Summer	Free	
MF	(Scotland)	Ross Wallace	Released	Summer	Free	
FW	(Tunisia)	Seifedin Chabbi	Gaziantep	Summer	Loan ended	
FW	(Scotland)	Alex Jakubiak	Watford	Summer	Loan ended	
DF	(Northern Ireland)	Lee Hodson	Gillingham	Summer	Loan ended	
DF	(England)	Akin Famewo	Norwich City	Summer	Loan ended	
DF	(Scotland)	Calum Waters	Kilmarnock	Summer	Loan ended	
DF	(Scotland)	Gary MacKenzie	Peterhead	Summer	Free	
FW	(Scotland)	Danny Mullen	Dundee	Summer	Free	
GK	(Czech Republic)	Václav Hladký	Salford City	Summer	Free	
FW	(England)	Cody Cooke	Weymouth	Summer	Free	
DF	(Iceland)	Ísak Þorvaldsson	Norwich City	Summer	Loan ended	
DF	(Scotland)	Jack Baird	Ayr United	Summer	Free	
MF	(Scotland)	Stephen McGinn	Hibernian	Summer	Free	
MF	(Scotland)	Kyle Magennis	Hibernian	Summer	Undisclosed	
FW	(Jamaica)	Junior Morias	Boreham Wood	Winter	Loan	
MF	(France)	Tony Andreu	Ross County	Winter	Free	
MF	(Republic of Ireland)	Sam Foley	Motherwell	Winter	Free	
GK	(Slovakia)	Peter Urminský	Ayr United	Winter	Loan	
FW	(Scotland)	Lewis Jamieson	Clyde	Winter	Loan	

== See also ==
- List of St Mirren F.C. seasons

== Notes ==
1. A: Hamilton were awarded a technical 3−0 win over St Mirren who were found guilty of breaking COVID-19 protocol following an SFA tribunal.
