= Bychowo, Pomeranian Voivodeship =

Bychowo
- Village
- Location within Poland
- Coordinates: 54°44′30″N 17°58′38″E
- Country: Poland
- Voivodeship: Pomeranian
- County: Wejherowo
- Gmina: Gniewino
- Population: 282

Bychowo [bɨˈxɔvɔ] (German: Bychow) is a village in the administrative district of Gmina Gniewino, within Wejherowo County, Pomeranian Voivodeship, in northern Poland.

For details of the history of the region, see History of Pomerania.
