= Filip Koperski =

Polish association football player

Personal information
- Full name: Filip Koperski
- Date of birth: 24 February 2004 (age 22)
- Place of birth: Gdańsk, Poland
- Height: 1.90 m (6 ft 3 in)
- Positions: Centre-back; right-back

Team information
- Current team: Radomiak Radom
- Number: 72

Youth career
- 2011–2013: AP Lechia Gdańsk
- 2013–2015: Escola Varsovia Warsaw
- 2016–2017: U.B. Catalònia
- 2017–2019: Unió Esportiva Sants
- 2019–2020: Lechia Gdańsk

Senior career*
Years	Team	Apps	(Gls)
2020–2022	Lechia Gdańsk II	9	(1)
2021–2025	Lechia Gdańsk	20	(1)
2024–2025	→ Olimpia Grudziądz (loan)	15	(2)
2025–2026	Olimpia Grudziądz	25	(1)
2026–	Radomiak Radom	12	(2)

International career^{‡}
2022	Poland U18	4	(0)
2022–2023	Poland U19	4	(2)
2024	Poland U20	2	(0)
2026–	Poland U21	1	(0)
- * Club domestic league appearances and goals as of 13:14, 7 November 2026 (UTC) ‡ National team caps and goals as of 21:30, 13 November 2026 (UTC)

Filip Koperski (born 24 February 2004) is a Polish professional footballer who plays as a centre-back or right-back for Ekstraklasa club Radomiak Radom.

== Career ==
=== Early years ===
Koperski's footballing journey started in 2011 when he joined the APLG footballing academy in Gdańsk. After two years with the APLG academy, Koperski made a series of moves joining different footballing academies, starting with a move to the Polish capital, Warsaw, joining Escola Varsovia Warsaw for two years. After his time in Warsaw, Koperski moved to Barcelona, Spain, joining U.B. Catalònia, with whom he spent a season, and Unió Esportiva Sants for two seasons. After three years in Spain, Koperski returned to Gdańsk to join Lechia Gdańsk. On 7 October 2020, Koperski made his debut for Lechia's reserve team in the regional Polish Cup against Orzeł Subkowy. Towards the end of 2020, Koperski was invited to train with the Lechia's first team, impressing manager Piotr Stokowiec.

=== Lechia Gdańsk ===
On 8 January 2021, Koperski signed his first professional contract, signing a deal with Lechia Gdańsk until 30 June 2023, and chose the number 72, which he stated was dedicated to his father.

== Honours ==
Lechia Gdańsk

- I liga: 2023–24
