= Bassekou Diabaté =

Malian footballer (born 2000)

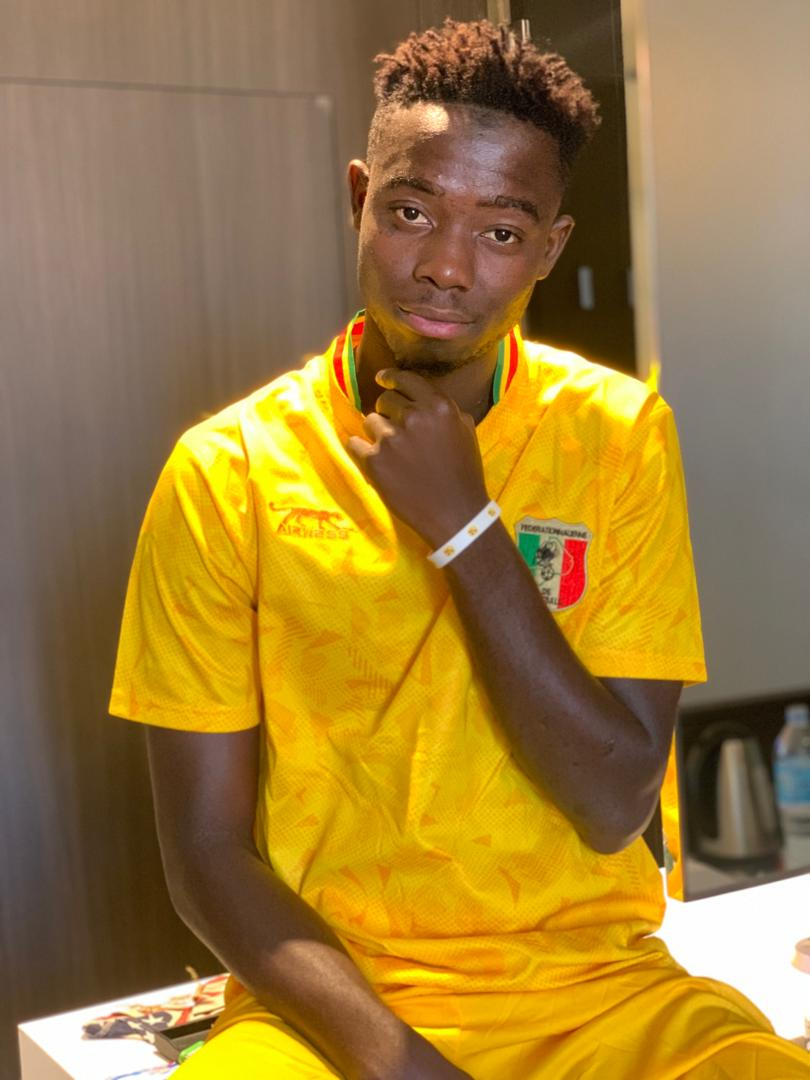
- Diabaté in 2022

Personal information
- Full name: Bassekou Diabaté
- Date of birth: 15 April 2000 (age 26)
- Place of birth: Bamako, Mali
- Height: 1.84 m (6 ft 0 in)
- Position: Forward

Team information
- Current team: Maxline Vitebsk
- Number: 9

Senior career*
Years	Team	Apps	(Gls)
2020–2021	Yeelen Olympique		
2021	→ Lechia Gdańsk (loan)	13	(0)
2022–2023	Lechia Gdańsk	30	(0)
2023–2024	Jerv	12	(4)
2024–2025	Stabæk	46	(26)
2026–	Maxline Vitebsk	13	(4)

International career
2021	Mali	6	(0)
- * Club domestic league appearances and goals as of 4 July 2026

Bassekou Diabaté (born 15 April 2000) is a Malian professional footballer who plays as a forward for Belarusian Premier League club Maxline Vitebsk.

== Club career ==
Diabaté joined Polish Ekstraklasa club Lechia Gdańsk on loan with an option to buy on 15 July 2021. He made his debut on 2 August 2021 against Wisła Płock. On 30 December 2021, Diabaté joined Lechia on a permanent basis until 2025.

On 11 August 2023, Diabaté signed with Norwegian side Jerv, on a contract until end of 2026.

== International career ==
Diabaté made his professional debut with the Mali national team in a 1–0 2020 African Nations Championship tie with Burkina Faso on 16 January 2021.

== Career statistics ==
=== Club ===
As of match played 28 July 2023.

Appearances and goals by club, season and competition
Club	Season	League			National cup (Note: Includes Polish Cup)		Europe		Other		Total	
Club	Season	Division	Apps	Goals	Apps	Goals	Apps	Goals	Apps	Goals	Apps	Goals
Lechia Gdańsk	2021–22	Ekstraklasa	18	0	1	0	—		—		19	0
Lechia Gdańsk	2022–23	Ekstraklasa	23	0	1	0	1 (Note: Appearance in UEFA Europa Conference League)	0	—		25	0
Lechia Gdańsk	2023–24	I liga	2	0	0	0	—		—		2	0
Career total			43	0	2	0	1	0	0	0	46	0

=== International ===
Appearances and goals by national team and year
National team	Year	Apps	Goals
Mali
Mali	2021	6	0
Total		6	0
