= Alpy, Pomeranian Voivodeship =

Alpy
- Village
- Location within Poland
- Coordinates: 54°40′48″N 18°3′24″E
- Country: Poland
- Voivodeship: Pomeranian
- County: Wejherowo
- Gmina: Gniewino

Alpy [ˈalpɨ] is a village in the administrative district of Gmina Gniewino, within Wejherowo County, Pomeranian Voivodeship, in northern Poland.

== See also ==
- History of Pomerania
