= Toliszczek =

Village in Kashubia

Toliszczek Toliszczk
- Village
- Location within Poland
- Coordinates: 54°44′47″N 18°0′54″E
- Country: Poland
- Voivodeship: Pomeranian
- County: Wejherowo
- Gmina: Gniewino
- Population: 73

Toliszczek [tɔˈliʂt͡ʂɛk] (Kashubian: Toliszczk) is a village in the administrative district of Gmina Gniewino, within Wejherowo County, Pomeranian Voivodeship, in northern Poland.

For details of the history of the region, see History of Pomerania.
