= Gniewino =

Village in Kashubia

Gniewino Gniéwino
- Village
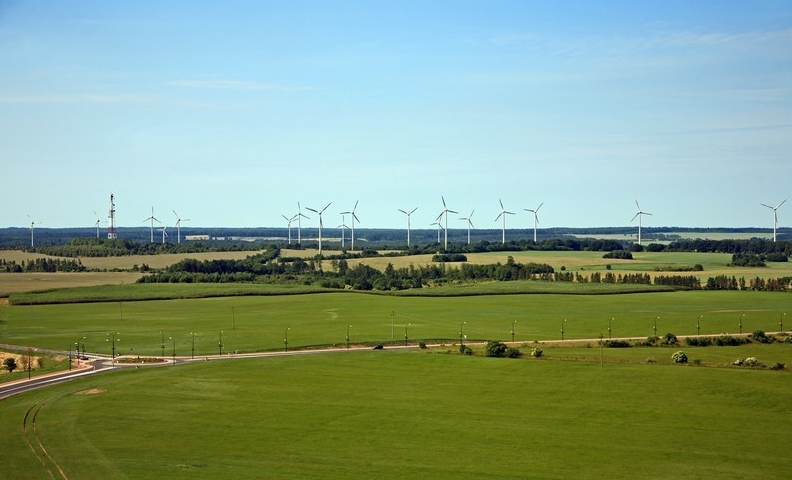
- Wind farm

- Coat of arms

- Location within Poland
- Coordinates: 54°43′0″N 18°0′30″E
- Country: Poland
- Voivodeship: Pomeranian
- County: Wejherowo
- Gmina: Gniewino
- Area: 176.2 km^{2} (68.0 sq mi)
- Population: 1,710
  - Density: 9.70/km^{2} (25.1/sq mi)
- Time zone: UTC+1 (CET)
  - Summer (DST): UTC+2 (CEST)
- Postal Code: 84-250
- Area Code: (+48) 58
- Vehicle registration: GWE
- Website: www.gniewino.pl

Gniewino [ɡɲɛˈvinɔ] (Kashubian: Gniéwino; German: Gnewin) is a village in Wejherowo County, Pomeranian Voivodeship, in northern Poland. It is the seat of the gmina (administrative district) called Gmina Gniewino.

A little to the east of Gniewino lies the Kashubian Eye Complex, a tourism and recreation complex centred on a 44-metre-tall (144 ft) viewing tower.

The Spain National Football Team was based here during the 2012 European Championships held in Poland and Ukraine.

== Gallery ==
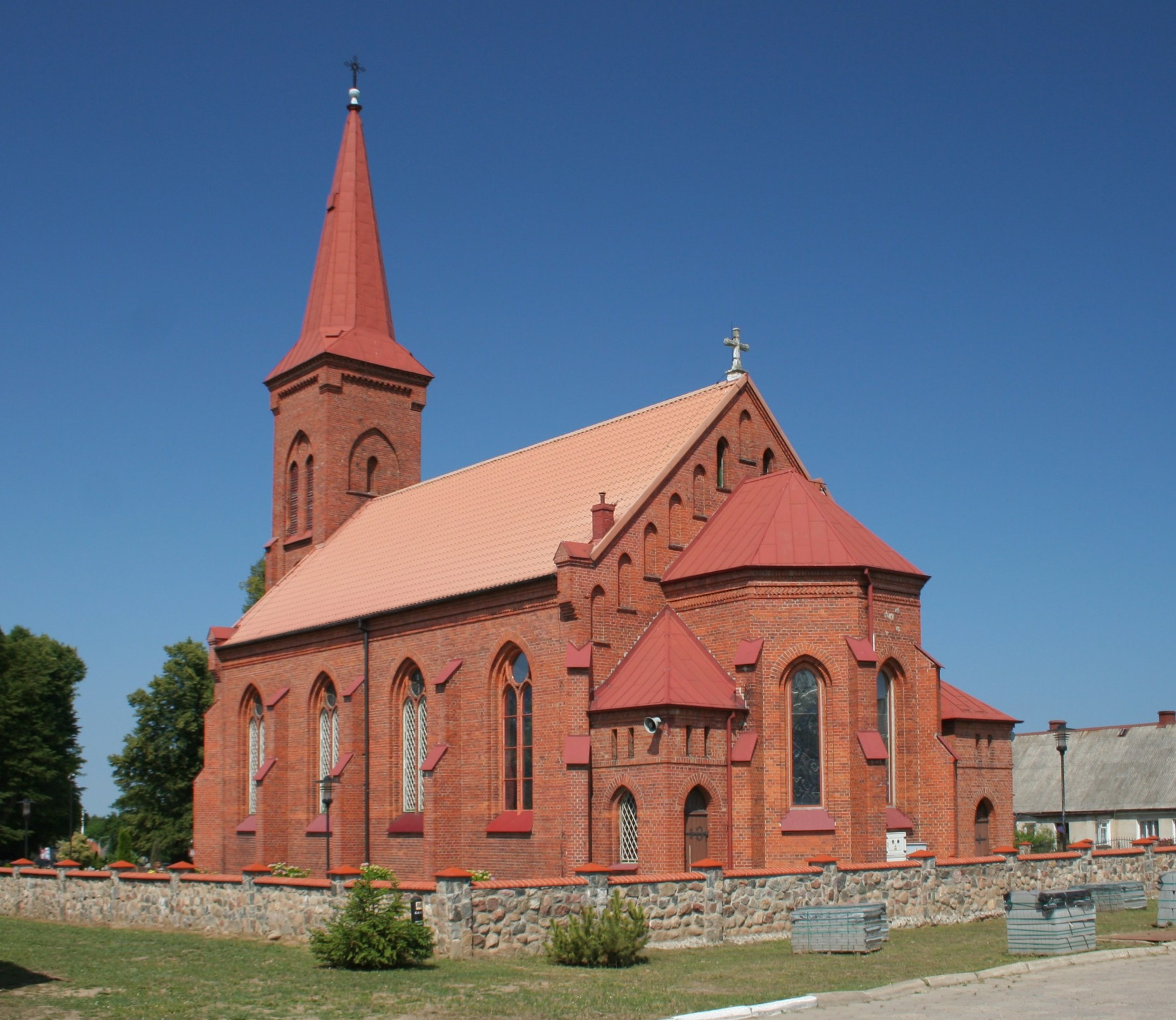
Church

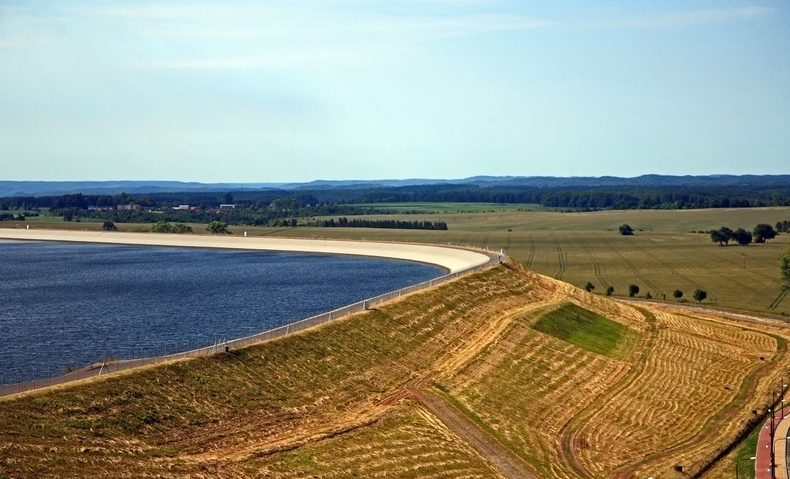
Gniewino

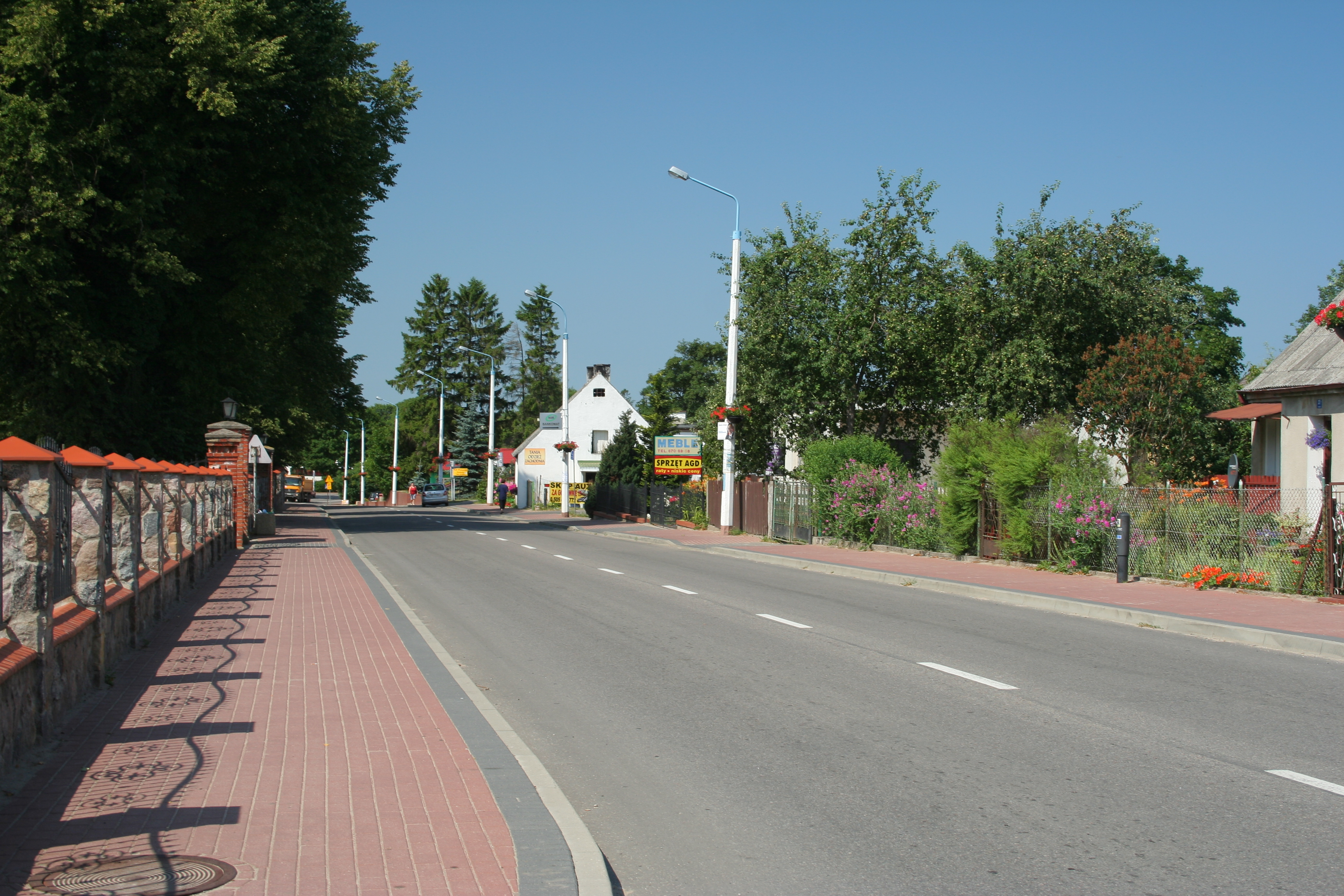
Road

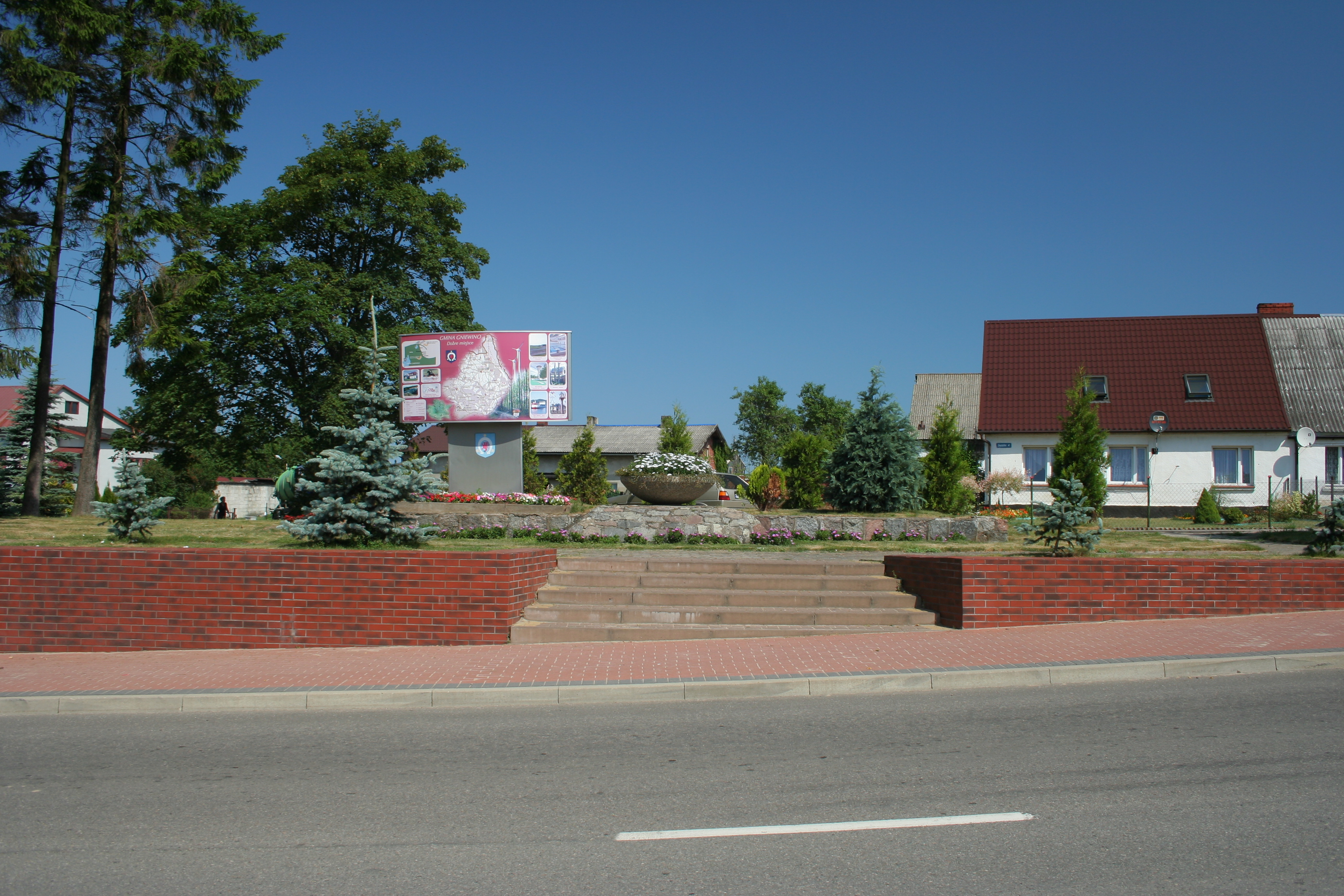
Square in Gniewino.

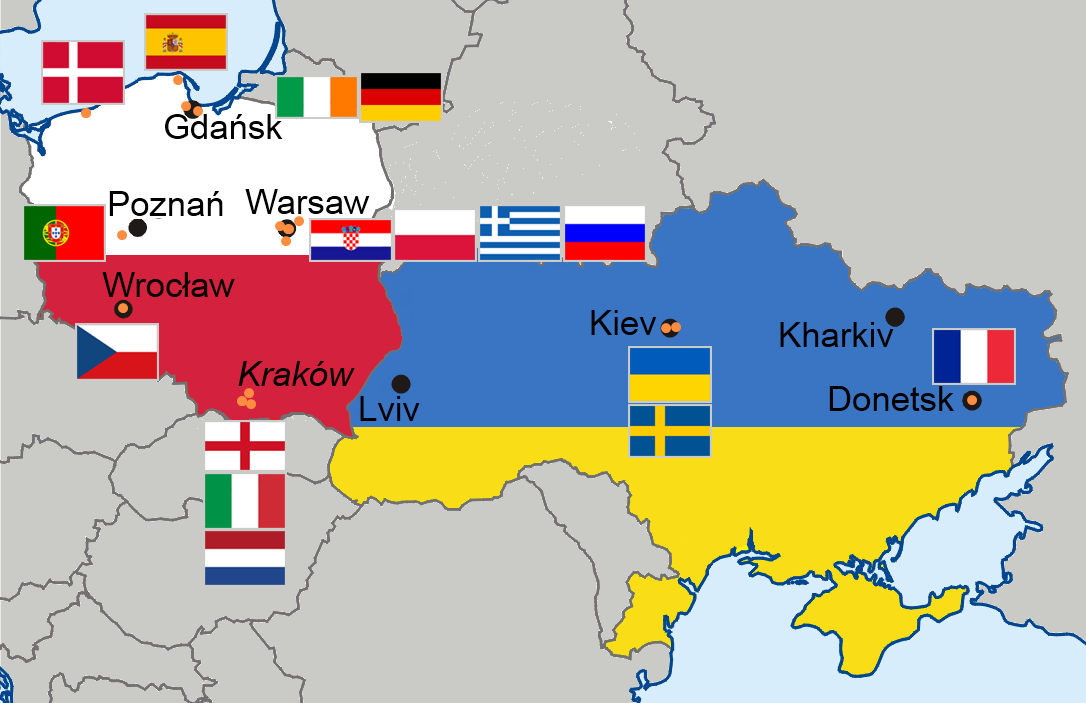
UEFA Euro 2012

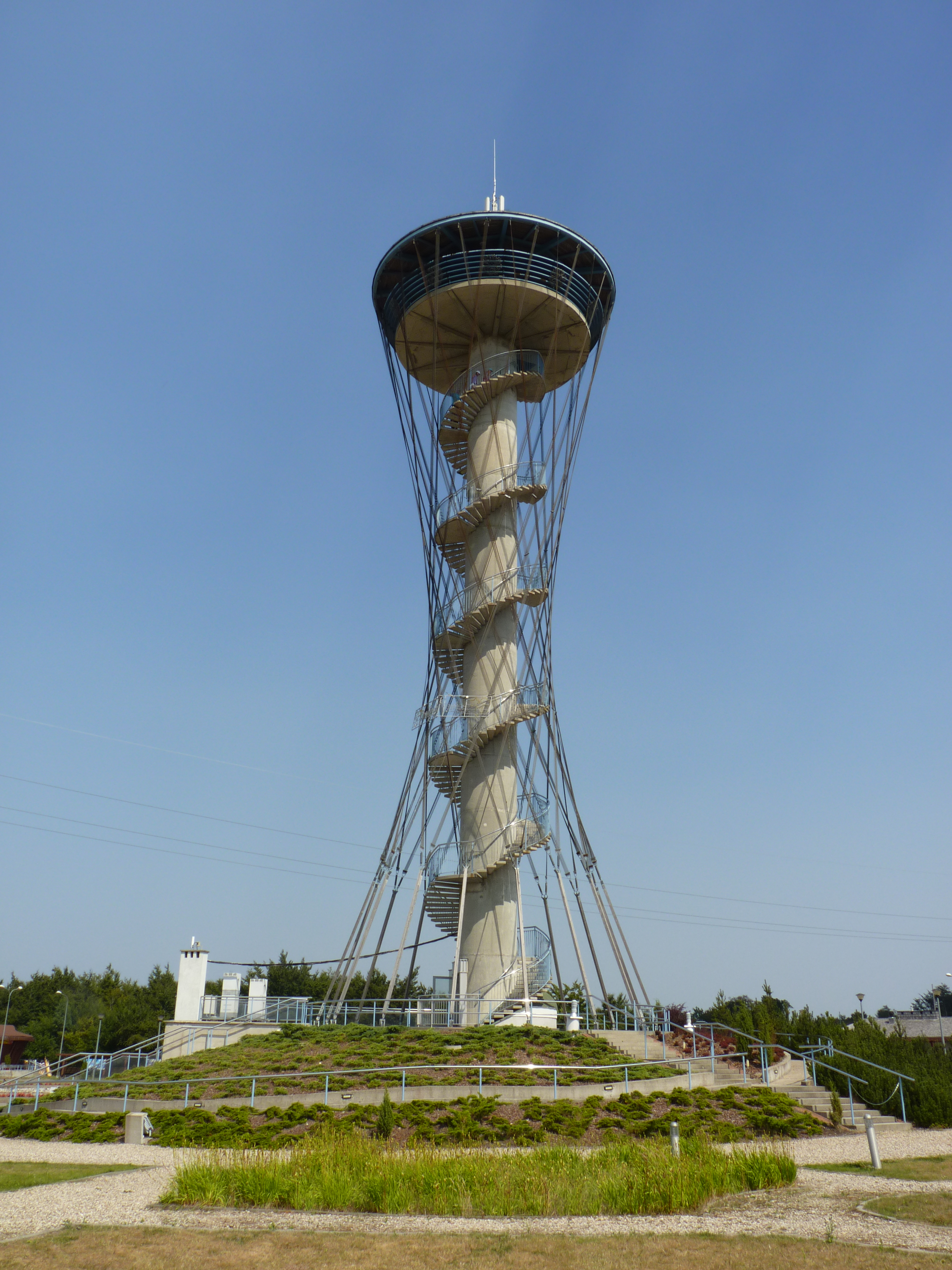
The viewing tower at the Kashubian Eye Complex near Gniewino
