= 2018–19 Piast Gliwice season =

Piast Gliwice
2018–19 season
- Manager: Waldemar Fornalik
- Stadium: Stadion Piast
- Ekstraklasa: 1st
- Polish Cup: Round of 32
- Top goalscorer: League: Piotr Parzyszek (9); All: Piotr Parzyszek (9)
- Highest home attendance: 9,913 v Lech Poznań (19 May 2019, Ekstraklasa)
- Lowest home attendance: 2,824 v Pogoń Szczecin (3 December 2018, Ekstraklasa)
- Average home league attendance: 4,978
- Biggest win: 4–0 v Lech Poznań (Home, 15 February 2019, Ekstraklasa); 4–0 v Korona Kielce (Home, 13 April 2019, Ekstraklasa)
- Biggest defeat: 1–4 v Śląsk Wrocław (Away, 23 September 2018, Ekstraklasa)
Home colours	Away colours	Third colours

The 2018–19 season was Gliwicki Klub Sportowy Piast Gliwice's 7th consecutive season in the Ekstraklasa. In addition to the domestic league, Piast Gliwice participated in the Polish Cup.

== Squad ==
Squad at end of season

Note: Flags indicate national team as defined under FIFA eligibility rules; some limited exceptions apply. Players may hold more than one non-FIFA nationality.

No.	Pos.	Nation	Player
1	GK	POL	Jakub Szmatuła
2	DF	DEN	Mikkel Kirkeskov
3	MF	POL	Tomasz Jodłowiec
4	DF	POL	Jakub Czerwiński
5	DF	POL	Marcin Pietrowski
6	MF	ENG	Tom Hateley
7	MF	POL	Aleksander Jagiełło
9	FW	POL	Piotr Parzyszek
10	MF	POL	Patryk Dziczek
11	MF	ESP	Jorge Félix
12	GK	POL	Karol Dybowski
13	GK	POL	Michał Bodys
15	DF	POL	Adam Tymiński
17	MF	ECU	Joel Valencia

No.	Pos.	Nation	Player
18	MF	POL	Patryk Sokołowski
19	MF	POL	Mateusz Mak
20	DF	POL	Martin Konczkowski
21	MF	ESP	Gerard Badía
22	DF	POL	Tomasz Mokwa
24	DF	POL	Damian Byrtek
25	DF	SRB	Aleksandar Sedlar
26	GK	SVK	František Plach
27	FW	CZE	Michal Papadopulos
29	MF	POL	Remigiusz Borkała
88	DF	SLO	Uroš Korun
98	FW	POL	Paweł Tomczyk
99	FW	POL	Karol Stanek

== Transfers ==
=== Summer ===
In:

No.	Pos.	Nation	Player
4	DF	POL	Jakub Czerwiński (From Legia Warsaw, previously on loan)
9	FW	POL	Piotr Parzyszek (From (Netherlands) Zwolle)
11	MF	ESP	Jorge Félix (From (Spain) Lleida Esportiu)
18	MF	POL	Patryk Sokołowski (From Wigry Suwałki)
22	DF	POL	Tomasz Mokwa (From GKS Katowice)

Out:

No.	Pos.	Nation	Player
10	FW	POL	Karol Angielski (To Wisła Płock)
12	MF	SLO	Saša Živec (To (Cyprus) Omonia)
15	DF	POL	Adam Mójta (To Pogoń Siedlce)
77	MF	POL	Igor Sapała (To Raków Częstochowa, previously on loan)
24	DF	CRO	Dario Rugašević
44	FW	POL	Mateusz Szczepaniak (Return to Cracovia)
82	MF	SVK	Martin Bukata (To (Italy) Benevento Calcio)
93	DF	LTU	Edvinas Girdvainis (Previously on loan at (Russia) Tom Tomsk)
—	DF	POL	Bartosz Waleńcik (Loan to Górnik Łęczna, previously on loan at Legionovia Legionowo)

== Competitions ==
=== Overview ===
Competition	First match	Last match	Starting round	Final position	Record							
Competition	First match	Last match	Starting round	Final position	Pld	W	D	L	GF	GA	GD	Win %
Ekstraklasa	23 July 2018	19 May 2019	Matchday 1	Winners	37	21	9	7	57	33	+24	56.76
Polish Cup	26 September 2018	30 October 2018	Round of 64	Round of 32	2	1	1	0	3	2	+1	50.00
Total					39	22	10	7	60	35	+25	56.41

Source: Competitions

=== Ekstraklasa ===
==== Regular season ====
===== League table =====
Pos	Team	Pld	W	D	L	GF	GA	GD	Pts	Qualification
1	Lechia Gdańsk	30	17	9	4	45	25	+20	60 (Note: Head-to-head record: Legia Warsaw 0–0 Lechia Gdańsk, Lechia Gdańsk 0–0 Legia Warsaw. Goal difference: Lechia Gdańsk (+20), Legia Warsaw (+17))	Qualification for the Championship round
2	Legia Warsaw	30	18	6	6	48	31	+17	60	Qualification for the Championship round
3	Piast Gliwice	30	15	8	7	47	31	+16	53	Qualification for the Championship round
4	Cracovia	30	14	6	10	39	34	+5	48	Qualification for the Championship round
5	Zagłębie Lubin	30	14	5	11	48	38	+10	47 (Note: Head-to-head record: Zagłębie Lubin 0–2 Jagiellonia Białystok, Jagiellonia Białystok 0–4 Zagłębie Lubin.)	Qualification for the Championship round

Source: Ekstraklasa, 90minut
Rules for classification: 1) Points; 2) Head-to-head points; 3) Head-to-head goal difference; 4) Head-to-head goals scored; 5) Head-to-head away goals scored (only if two teams); 6) Goal difference; 7) Goals scored; 8) Fairplay ranking; 9) Draw. (Note: Head-to-head record is used only after all the matches between the teams in question have been played.)

===== Results summary =====
Overall								Home						Away					
Pld	W	D	L	GF	GA	GD	Pts	W	D	L	GF	GA	GD	W	D	L	GF	GA	GD
30	15	8	7	47	31	+16	53	11	3	1	28	8	+20	4	5	6	19	23	−4

Source: Soccerway

===== Results by round =====
Round	1	2	3	4	5	6	7	8	9	10	11	12	13	14	15	16	17	18	19	20	21	22	23	24	25	26	27	28	29	30
Ground	A	A	H	H	A	H	A	H	A	H	A	H	A	H	A	H	H	A	A	H	A	H	A	H	A	H	A	H	A	H
Result	W	W	W	L	L	W	D	W	L	W	D	D	D	W	L	D	W	D	L	D	L	W	W	W	W	W	L	W	D	W
Position	2	2	1	3	5	4	5	4	6	2	5	5	5	4	5	5	4	4	5	6	7	5	4	3	3	3	3	3	3	3
Points	3	6	9	9	9	12	13	16	16	19	20	21	22	25	25	26	29	30	30	31	31	34	37	40	43	46	46	49	50	53

Source: Worldfootball.net
A = Away; H = Home; W = Win; D = Draw; L = Loss

===== Matches =====
23 July 2018 1	Zagłębie Sosnowiec	1–2	Piast Gliwice	Sosnowiec
18:00 CEST (UTC+2)	Sanogo 36'	Report	Sedlar 67' (pen.); Jodłowiec 80'	Stadium: Stadion Ludowy; Attendance: 4,500; Referee: T. Musial

30 July 2018 2	Pogoń Szczecin	0–2	Piast Gliwice	Szczecin
18:00 CEST (UTC+2)	Frączczak (yellow card) 41'; Kožulj (yellow card) 89'	Report	Valencia 6'; Mak 11'; Czerwiński (yellow card) 74'	Stadium: Florian Krygier Stadium; Attendance: 7,532; Referee: T. Kwiatkowski

4 August 2018 3	Piast Gliwice	2–1	Zagłębie Lubin	Gliwice
18:00 CEST (UTC+2)	Valencia 23'; Hateley 83'	Report	Tuszyński 33'; Tosik (yellow card) 45'; Dziwniel (yellow card) 57'	Stadium: Stadion Piast; Attendance: 4,114; Referee: P. Gil

12 August 2018 4	Piast Gliwice	1–3	Legia Warsaw	Gliwice
15:30 CEST (UTC+2)	Pietrowski (red card) 45+1'; Valencia (yellow card) 51'; Papadopulos 56'; Dziczek (yellow card) 90+3'	Report	Jędrzejczyk 22'; Kanté 86', (yellow card) 90+3'; Nagy 90+6'	Stadium: Stadion Piast; Attendance: 7,120; Referee: M. Zlotek

19 August 2018 5	Jagiellonia Białystok	2–1	Piast Gliwice	Białystok
18:00 CEST (UTC+2)	Savković 22'; Machaj (yellow card) 26'; Klemenz (yellow card) 90'; Novikovas 90+4'	Report	Dziczek 58'; Konczkowski (yellow card) 82'	Stadium: Białystok Stadium; Attendance: 10,664; Referee: D. Stefański

24 August 2018 6	Piast Gliwice	3–1	Cracovia	Gliwice
18:00 CEST (UTC+2)	Félix 15'; Papadopulos 25'; Hateley (penalty missed) 45', 66'; Czerwiński (yellow card) 45+3'; Korun (yellow card) 62'; Kirkeskov (yellow card) 82'	Report	Budziński (red card) 12'; Dimun (yellow card) 18'; Dytyatyev (yellow card) 45+3'; Hernández 74'; Datković (yellow card) 83'	Stadium: Stadion Piast; Attendance: 4,075; Referee: P. Raczkowski

1 September 2018 7	Lech Poznań	1–1	Piast Gliwice	Poznań
20:30 CEST (UTC+2)	Gytkjær (yellow card) 37'; Cywka 42'; Tiba (yellow card) 45'; Jóźwiak (yellow card) 72'; Tomczyk (yellow card) 90+2'	Report	Hateley 74'; Dziczek (yellow card) 90'	Stadium: Poznań Stadium; Attendance: 8,139; Referee: T. Kwiatkowski

15 September 2018 8	Piast Gliwice	1–0	Arka Gdynia	Gliwice
18:00 CEST (UTC+2)	Papadopulos 62'	Report	Bohdanov (yellow card) 12' (yellow-red card) 42'; Danielak (yellow card) 90+2'	Stadium: Stadion Piast; Attendance: 4,003

23 September 2018 9	Śląsk Wrocław	4–1	Piast Gliwice	Wrocław
15:30 CEST (UTC+2)	Pich 41'; Celeban 47'; Łabojko (yellow card) 60'; Robak 75'; Radecki (yellow card) 81'; Cholewiak 87'	Report	Papadopulos (yellow card) 39'; Czerwiński 61'; Valencia (yellow card) 79'	Stadium: Wrocław Stadium; Attendance: 7,613; Referee: K. Jakubik

29 September 2018 10	Piast Gliwice	1–0	Górnik Zabrze	Gliwice
15:30 CEST (UTC+2)	Badía (yellow card) 71', (goal) 72'; Mak (yellow card) 90+2' (not on pitch)	Report	Koj (yellow card) 64'; Wiśniewski (yellow card) 90+2'	Stadium: Stadion Piast; Attendance: 5,313; Referee: T. Musial

5 October 2018 11	Miedź Legnica	2–2	Piast Gliwice	Legnica
18:00 CEST (UTC+2)	Szczepaniak 5'; Piasecki 45+1'; Cruz (yellow card) 78'	Report	Papadopulos 18'; Pikk 41' (o.g.); Dziczek (yellow card) 70'; Kirkeskov (yellow card) 73'	Stadium: Stadion Miejski; Attendance: 5,223; Referee: D. Sulikowski

19 October 2018 12	Piast Gliwice	1–1	Lechia Gdańsk	Gliwice
18:00 CEST (UTC+2)	Sedlar 29' (pen.); Hateley (yellow card) 88'	Report	Augustyn (yellow card) 70'; Nunes (yellow card) 76'; Haraslín 86'; Paixão (yellow card) 90+1'	Stadium: Stadion Piast; Attendance: 3,853; Referee: K. Jakubik

27 October 2018 13	Wisła Płock	1–1	Piast Gliwice	Płock
15:30 CEST (UTC+2)	Merebashvili (yellow card) 36'; Furman (yellow card) 77'; Czerwiński 90+4' (o.g.)	Report	Parzyszek 63'; Papadopulos (yellow card) 90'	Stadium: Kazimierz Górski Stadium; Attendance: 2,412; Referee: J. Przybyl

2 November 2018 14	Piast Gliwice	2–0	Wisła Kraków	Gliwice
20:30 CET (UTC+1)	Dziczek 23'; Valencia (yellow card) 81'; Sokołowski 88'	Report	Sadlok (yellow card) 57'; Arsenić (yellow card) 87'; Imaz (yellow card) 90+1'	Stadium: Stadion Piast; Attendance: 4,101; Referee: S. Marciniak

11 November 2018 15	Korona Kielce	1–0	Piast Gliwice	Kielce
15:30 CET (UTC+1)	Rymaniak (yellow card) 15'; Soriano 38'	Report	Papadopulos (yellow card) 25'; Czerwiński (yellow card) 72'; Gojko (yellow card) 87'; Sedlar (yellow card) 90'; Kirkeskov (yellow card) 90+5'	Stadium: Suzuki Arena; Attendance: 6,525; Referee: M. Zlotek

23 November 2018 16	Piast Gliwice	0–0	Zagłębie Sosnowiec	Gliwice
18:00 CET (UTC+1)		Report	Kudła (yellow card) 90+4'	Stadium: Stadion Piast; Attendance: 3,176; Referee: B. Frankowski

3 December 2018 17	Piast Gliwice	3–0	Pogoń Szczecin	Gliwice
18:00 CET (UTC+1)	Jodłowiec 10', 61'; Sedlar 17' (pen.)	Report	Podstawski (yellow card) 57'; Walukiewicz (yellow card) 67'; Załuska (red card) 81'	Stadium: Stadion Piast; Attendance: 2,824; Referee: P. Gil

7 December 2018 18	Zagłębie Lubin	2–2	Piast Gliwice	Lubin
18:00 CET (UTC+1)	Poręba 39'; Bohar 52'; Matuszczyk (yellow card) 69'; Guldan (yellow card) 87'	Report	Hateley (yellow card) 8'; Czerwiński 35'; Papadopulos (yellow card) 47'; Konczkowski (yellow card) 50'; Dziczek (yellow card) 51'; Parzyszek 71'; Jodłowiec (yellow card) 77'; Kirkeskov (yellow card) 84'; Valencia (yellow card) 87'	Stadium: Lubin Stadium; Attendance: 2,148; Referee: D. Stefanski

15 December 2018 19	Legia Warsaw	2–0	Piast Gliwice	Warsaw
20:30 CET (UTC+1)	Kulenović 20'; Szymański (yellow card) 45+2'; Vešović (yellow card) 54'; Jędrzejczyk (yellow card) 66'; Philipps (yellow card) 80'; Carlitos 84'	Report	Czerwiński (yellow card) 49'; Korun (yellow card) 74'; Sedlar (yellow card) 89'	Stadium: Polish Army Stadium; Attendance: 17,026; Referee: B. Frankowski

21 December 2018 20	Piast Gliwice	1–1	Jagiellonia Białystok	Gliwice
18:00 CET (UTC+1)	Hateley 17'; Korun (yellow card) 78'	Report	Świderski 23'; Romanczuk (yellow card) 44'; Kwiecień (yellow card) 64'	Stadium: Stadion Piast; Attendance: 3,132; Referee: S. Marciniak

9 February 2019 21	Cracovia	2–1	Piast Gliwice	Kraków
18:00 CET (UTC+1)	Airam 38'; Hanca 50'	Report	Félix 22'; Papadopulos (yellow card) 33'; Sedlar (yellow card) 46'	Stadium: Józef Piłsudski Cracovia Stadium; Attendance: 5,683; Referee: W. Myc

15 February 2019 22	Piast Gliwice	4–0	Lech Poznań	Gliwice
20:30 CET (UTC+1)	Parzyszek 30'; Félix 53'; Kirkeskov 66'; Valencia 70'	Report	Trałka (yellow card) 86'; Tiba (penalty missed) 90+3'	Stadium: Stadion Piast; Attendance: 4,608; Referee: J. Przybyl

22 February 2019 23	Arka Gdynia	1–2	Piast Gliwice	Gdynia
18:00 CET (UTC+1)	Marciniak (yellow card) 36'; Marić (yellow card) 55'; Sołdecki (yellow card) 75'; Janota (penalty missed) 83'; Zbozień 88'	Report	Czerwiński 28'; Valencia 42'; Dziczek (yellow card) 44'; Plach (yellow card) 90+4'	Stadium: Stadion Miejski; Attendance: 3,501; Referee: W. Myc

1 March 2019 24	Piast Gliwice	2–0	Śląsk Wrocław	Gliwice
18:00 CET (UTC+1)	Parzyszek 4'; Valencia 55'; Dziczek (yellow card) 59'	Report		Stadium: Stadion Piast; Attendance: 4,528; Referee: K. Jakubik

8 March 2019 25	Górnik Zabrze	0–2	Piast Gliwice	Zabrze
18:00 CET (UTC+1)	Koj (yellow card) 35' (yellow-red card) 58'; Jiménez (yellow card) 85'; Baido (yellow card) 89'	Report	Kirkeskov 36'; Hateley (yellow card) 44'; Sedlar 86' (pen.); Félix (yellow card) 90+5'	Stadium: Arena Zabrze; Attendance: 16,633; Referee: S. Marciniak

17 March 2019 26	Piast Gliwice	2–1	Miedź Legnica	Gliwice
15:30 CET (UTC+1)	Félix 39'; Badía (yellow card) 51'; Parzyszek 62'; Dziczek (yellow card) 81'	Report	Piasecki (yellow card) 54'; Forsell 71', (yellow card) 72'	Stadium: Stadion Piast; Attendance: 5,571; Referee: W. Myc

29 March 2019 27	Lechia Gdańsk	2–0	Piast Gliwice	Gdańsk
20:30 CET (UTC+1)	Augustyn 6'; Nalepa 33'	Report		Stadium: Stadion Energa Gdańsk; Attendance: 15,073; Referee: P. Raczkowski

3 April 2019 28	Piast Gliwice	1–0	Wisła Płock	Gliwice
18:00 CEST (UTC+2)	Parzyszek 26'; Pietrowski (yellow card) 56'	Report		Stadium: Stadion Piast; Attendance: 4,159; Referee: T. Kwiatkowski

6 April 2019 29	Wisła Kraków	2–2	Piast Gliwice	Kraków
18:00 CEST (UTC+2)	Sadlok (yellow card) 25'; Pietrzak (penalty missed) 34'; Palčič 35', 57'; Basha (yellow card) 51'	Report	Dziczek 19'; Papadopulos 79'	Stadium: Henryk Reyman Municipal Stadium; Attendance: 26,010; Referee: S. Marciniak

13 April 2019 30	Piast Gliwice	4–0	Korona Kielce	Gliwice
18:00 CEST (UTC+2)	Tamm 17' (o.g.); Félix 19'; Pietrowski 58', (yellow card) 80'; Jodłowiec (yellow card) 79'; Tomczyk 90'; Sedlar (penalty missed) 90+3'	Report	Márquez (yellow card) 22'; Hamrol (yellow card) 90+2'	Stadium: Stadion Piast; Attendance: 4,410; Referee: J. Przybyl

==== Championship round ====
===== League table =====
Pos	Team	Pld	W	D	L	GF	GA	GD	Pts	Qualification
1	Piast Gliwice (C)	37	21	9	7	57	33	+24	72	Qualification for the Champions League first qualifying round
2	Legia Warsaw	37	20	8	9	55	38	+17	68	Qualification for the Europa League first qualifying round
3	Lechia Gdańsk	37	19	10	8	54	38	+16	67	Qualification for the Europa League second qualifying round (Note: Lechia Gdańsk qualified for the Europa League second qualifying round by winning the 2018–19 Polish Cup.)
4	Cracovia	37	17	6	14	45	43	+2	57 (Note: Points in regular season: Cracovia 48 points, Jagiellonia Białystok 47 points.)	Qualification for the Europa League first qualifying round
5	Jagiellonia Białystok	37	16	9	12	55	52	+3	57	

Source: Ekstraklasa, 90minut
Rules for classification: 1) Points; 2) Points in regular season; 3) Head-to-head points in regular season; 4) Head-to-head goal difference in regular season; 5) Head-to-head goals scored in regular season; 5) Head-to-head away goals scored in regular season (if only two teams); 7) Goal difference; 8) Goals scored; 9) Fairplay ranking; 10) Play-off (only if needed to decide champion, teams for relegation or teams for UEFA competitions).
(C) Champions

===== Results summary =====
Overall								Home						Away					
Pld	W	D	L	GF	GA	GD	Pts	W	D	L	GF	GA	GD	W	D	L	GF	GA	GD
7	6	1	0	10	2	+8	19	4	0	0	7	2	+5	2	1	0	3	0	+3

Source: Worldfootball

===== Results by round =====
Round	31	32	33	34	35	36	37
Ground	A	H	H	A	H	A	H
Result	W	W	W	W	W	D	W
Position	3	3	3	2	1	1	1
Points	56	59	62	65	68	69	72

Source: Worldfootball
A = Away; H = Home; W = Win; D = Draw; L = Loss

===== Matches =====
20 April 2019 31	Lechia Gdańsk	0–2	Piast Gliwice	Gdańsk
15:30 CEST (UTC+2)	Kubicki (yellow card) 37' (yellow-red card) 44'	Report	Konczkowski (yellow card) 10'; Parzyszek 29'; Mokwa (yellow card) 85'; Félix 90+5'	Stadium: Stadion Energa Gdańsk; Attendance: 13,965; Referee: S. Marciniak

23 April 2019 32	Piast Gliwice	1–0	Zagłębie Lubin	Gliwice
18:00 CEST (UTC+2)	Parzyszek 15'; Félix (red card) 19'; Dziczek (yellow card) 39'	Report	Dąbrowski (yellow card) 87'	Stadium: Stadion Piast; Attendance: 4,541; Referee: L. Szczech

26 April 2019 33	Piast Gliwice	3–1	Cracovia	Gliwice
20:30 CEST (UTC+2)	Sedlar 11' (pen.), 66'; Mokwa (yellow card) 30'; Badía (yellow card) 37'; Tomczyk 88'	Report	Airam 31' (pen.), (yellow card) 40'; Dimun (yellow card) 45+2'; Čečarić (yellow card) 52'; Hernández (yellow card) 68'; Wdowiak (yellow card) 86'	Stadium: Stadion Piast; Attendance: 6,104; Referee: P. Raczkowski

4 May 2019 34	Legia Warsaw	0–1	Piast Gliwice	Warsaw
20:30 CEST (UTC+2)	Rocha (yellow card) 12'; Vešović (yellow card) 21'; Martins (yellow card) 33'	Report	Badía 13'; Hateley (yellow card) 86'	Stadium: Polish Army Stadium; Attendance: 26,490; Referee: S. Marciniak

12 May 2019 35	Piast Gliwice	2–1	Jagiellonia Białystok	Gliwice
13:00 CEST (UTC+2)	Sedlar (yellow card) 32'; Valencia 45+3'; Jodłowiec 90+1'; Dziczek (yellow card) 90+6'	Report	Imaz 89' (pen.), (penalty missed) 90+4', (yellow card) 90+6'	Stadium: Stadion Piast; Attendance: 9,028; Referee: J. Przybyl

15 May 2019 36	Pogoń Szczecin	0–0	Piast Gliwice	Szczecin
20:30 CEST (UTC+2)		Report		Stadium: Florian Krygier Stadium; Attendance: 3,689; Referee: J. Przybyl

19 May 2019 37	Piast Gliwice	1–0	Lech Poznań	Gliwice
18:00 CEST (UTC+2)	Parzyszek 27'	Report		Stadium: Stadion Piast; Attendance: 9,913; Referee: S. Marciniak

=== Polish Cup ===
26 September 2018 Round of 64	GKS Jastrzębie	1–2	Piast Gliwice	Jastrzębie-Zdrój
17:30 CEST (UTC+2)	Weis 74'; Pacholski (yellow card) 86'	Report	Ayong 30'; Gojko 37'	Stadium: Stadion Miejski

30 October 2018 Round of 32	Piast Gliwice	1–1 (a.e.t.) (2–4 p)	Legia Warsaw	Gliwice
20:30 CET (UTC+1)	Konczkowski (yellow card) 108'; Czerwiński 118'	Report	Nagy (yellow card) 63'; Kanté (yellow card) 86'; Carlitos 111'	Stadium: Stadion Piast; Attendance: 3,508; Referee: Tomasz Musiał
	Penalties
	Korun (penalty missed); Dziczek (penalty scored); Sokołowski (penalty missed); Papadopulos (penalty scored)		(penalty scored) Kucharczyk; (penalty scored) Cafú; (penalty scored) Antolić; (penalty scored) Kulenović
Note: Legia Warsaw won 4–2 on penalties.
