= 2020–21 Stal Mielec season =

Stal Mielec
2020-21 season
- Chairman: Bartłomiej Jaskot
- Manager: Dariusz Skrzypczak → Leszek Ojrzyński → Włodzimierz Gąsior
- Stadium: Stadion Miejski, Mielec
- Polish Cup: Round of 32
- Biggest defeat: 0–6 v Wisła Kraków (Ekstraklasa)
| Home colours | Away colours |
- All statistics correct as of 19 May 2021.

In the 2020–21 season, Stal Mielec competed in the Ekstraklasa. Moreover, they participated in the season's Polish Cup edition, since they were eliminated by Piast Gliwice, following a 1–1 draw (3–4 on penalties) in the round of 32.

== Players ==
=== Pre-season ===
As of 5 October 2020.

Note: Flags indicate national team as defined under FIFA eligibility rules; some limited exceptions apply. Players may hold more than one non-FIFA nationality.

| No. | Pos. | Nation | Player |
|---|---|---|---|
| 1 | GK | POL | Michał Gliwa ▲ |
| 2 | MF | POL | Mateusz Chmielowiec |
| 3 | DF | POL | Łukasz Seweryn |
| 4 | DF | BUL | Bozhidar Chorbadzhiyski ▲ |
| 5 | DF | POL | Mateusz Żyro |
| 6 | DF | POL | Marcin Flis ▲ |
| 7 | MF | POL | Maciej Domański |
| 8 | MF | POL | Maciej Urbańczyk |
| 9 | MF | SRB | Andreja Prokić |
| 10 | MF | POL | Mateusz Mak |
| 11 | DF | POL | Szymon Stasik |
| 12 | GK | POL | Mateusz Dudek |
| 13 | GK | POL | Rafał Strączek |
| 14 | DF | POL | Kamil Kościelny ▲ |
| 15 | DF | POL | Wojciech Błyszko ▲ (on loan from Jagiellonia Białystok) |

| No. | Pos. | Nation | Player |
|---|---|---|---|
| 17 | MF | FIN | Petteri Forsell ▲ |
| 18 | FW | POL | Bartosz Bajorek |
| 19 | FW | POL | Kacper Sadłocha |
| 20 | MF | POL | Grzegorz Tomasiewicz |
| 21 | MF | POL | Mateusz Matras ▲ |
| 23 | DF | POL | Krystian Getinger |
| 25 | DF | POL | Wojciech Lisowski |
| 27 | MF | POL | Damian Pawłowski ▲ (on loan from Wisła Kraków) |
| 29 | GK | POL | Damian Primel |
| 44 | DF | CZE | Martin Sus ▲ |
| 77 | FW | POL | Jakub Wróbel ▲ |
| 96 | MF | POL | Robert Dadok |
| 98 | FW | POL | Paweł Tomczyk ▲ (on loan from Lech Poznań) |
| 99 | FW | POL | Łukasz Zjawiński ▲ |

°▲ symbol applies for players who joined the club in the pre-season term.

== Competitions ==
=== Ekstraklasa ===
==== Standings ====
| Pos | Team | Pld | W | D | L | GF | GA | GD | Pts | Qualification or relegation |
|---|---|---|---|---|---|---|---|---|---|---|
| 12 | Wisła Płock | 30 | 8 | 9 | 13 | 37 | 44 | −7 | 33 (Note: Head-to-head matches: Wisła Kraków 0–3 Wisła Płock, Wisła Płock 1–3 Wisła Kraków.) | |
| 13 | Wisła Kraków | 30 | 8 | 9 | 13 | 39 | 42 | −3 | 33 | |
| 14 | Cracovia (Note: Cracovia was deducted 5 points for match-fixing during the 2003–04 II liga season (second tier at the time).) | 30 | 8 | 13 | 9 | 28 | 32 | −4 | 32 | |
| 15 | Stal Mielec | 30 | 6 | 11 | 13 | 31 | 47 | −16 | 29 | |
| 16 | Podbeskidzie Bielsko-Biała (R) | 30 | 6 | 7 | 17 | 29 | 60 | −31 | 25 | Relegation to I liga |

Source: ekstraklasa.org
Rules for classification: 1) Points; 2) Head-to-head points; 3) Head-to-head goal difference; 4) Head-to-head goals scored; 5) Head-to-head away goals scored (only if between two teams); 6) Goal difference; 7) Goals scored; 8) Number of wins; 9) Number of away wins; 10) Fairplay ranking; 11) Draw
(R) Relegated

==== Results summary ====
| Overall | | | | | | | | Home | | | | | | Away | | | | | |
| Pld | W | D | L | GF | GA | GD | Pts | W | D | L | GF | GA | GD | W | D | L | GF | GA | GD |
|---|---|---|---|---|---|---|---|---|---|---|---|---|---|---|---|---|---|---|---|
| 26 | 5 | 9 | 12 | 28 | 44 | −16 | 24 | 4 | 4 | 5 | 12 | 19 | −7 | 1 | 5 | 7 | 16 | 25 | −9 |

Last updated: 25 April 2021.
Source: Soccerway

==== Matches ====
| 23 August 2020 1 | Wisła Płock | 1–1 | Stal Mielec | Płock |
| 12:30 CET | Lesniak (yellow card) 36'; Rzeźniczak (yellow card) 75'; Szwoch 89' | Report | Żyro (yellow card) 45'; Prokić 55' | Stadium: Kazimierz Górski Płock City Stadium; Attendance: 1,318; Referee: (Poland) Sebastian Jarzebak |

| 28 August 2020 2 | Stal Mielec | 0–2 | Górnik Zabrze | Mielec |
| 20:30 CET | Kościelny (yellow card) 39'; Tomasiewicz (yellow card) 78' | Report | Bochniewicz 36'; Sobczyk (yellow card) 38'; Manneh 47'; Wiśniewski (yellow card) 58' | Stadium: Stadion MOSIR; Attendance: 3,420; Referee: (Poland) Paweł Gil |

| 12 September 2020 3 | Cracovia Kraków | 1–1 | Stal Mielec | Kraków |
| 15:00 CET | Iván Márquez (yellow card) 85'; Szymonowicz 90+11' | Report | Flis (yellow card) 29'; Forsell (yellow card) 62'; Matras (yellow card) 67'; Tomczyk 82'; Robert Dadok (yellow card) 84' | Stadium: Stadion Miejski im. Józefa Piłsudskiego; Attendance: 5,439; Referee: (Poland) Tomasz Kwiatkowski |

| 19 September 2020 4 | Lechia Gdańsk | 4–2 | Stal Mielec | Gdańsk |
| 14:00 CET | Flávio Paixão 4', 73' (pen.); Conrado 45+2'; Michał Nalepa 88' | Report | Krystian Getinger 23'; Mateusz Mak 45' | Stadium: Stadion Energa Gdańsk; Attendance: 4,507; Referee: (Poland) Bartosz Frankowski |

| 28 September 2020 5 | Stal Mielec | 3–2 | Piast Gliwice | Mielec |
| 18:00 CET | Domański 21' (pen.); Mak 55' 80' | Report | Konczkowski (yellow card) 26'; Żyro 49'; Steczyk 54'; Sokołowski (yellow card) 57'; Czerwiński (yellow card) 90+2' | Stadium: Stadion MOSIR; Attendance: 0 Referee: (Poland) Jarosław Przybył |
Note: COVID-19 pandemic in Poland

| 3 October 2020 6 | Podbeskidzie | 1–0 | Stal Mielec | Bielsko-Biała |
| 15:00 CET | Biliński 32'; Gach (yellow card) 62' | Report | Tomasiewicz (yellow card) 31' | Stadium: Stadion Miejski; Attendance: 2,987; Referee: (Poland) Łukasz Szczech |

| 25 October 2020 8 | Raków Częstochowa | 2–1 | Stal Mielec | Bełchatów |
| 15:00 CET | Ivi 27' 66'; Sapała (yellow card) 38'; Petrášek (yellow card) 90+4' | Report | Krystian Getinger (yellow card) 42'; Szymon Stasik (yellow card) 46'; Domański 77' | Stadium: GIEKSA Arena; Attendance: 0 Referee: (Poland) Artur Aluszyk |

| 18 December 2020 14 | Legia Warsaw | 2–3 | Stal Mielec | Warsaw |
| 20:30 CEST (UTC+2) | Slisz 17'; Pekhart 24'; Jędrzejczyk (yellow card) 58'; Luquinhas (yellow card) 84'; Wieteska (yellow card) 90+3' | Report | Domański 5' (pen.) 43' (pen.); Tomasiewicz (yellow card) 8' (goal) 60' (pen.); Mateusz Żyro (yellow card) 48'; Pawłowski (yellow card) 90+6' | Stadium: Polish Army Stadium; Attendance: 0 Referee: (Poland) Bartosz Frankowski |

=== Polish Cup ===
| 15 August 2020 Round of 64 | Karpaty Krosno | 0–2 | Stal Mielec | Krosno |
| 16:00 CEST (UTC+02:00) | | Łączy nas piłka 90minut | Dadok 58'; Tomczyk 76' | Stadium: Stadion MOSiR; Attendance: 999; Referee: Karol Iwanowicz (Lublin) |

| 2 December 2020 Round of 32 | Stal Mielec | 1–1 (a.e.t.) (3–4 p) | Piast Gliwice | Mielec |
| 17:40 CET (UTC+01:00) | Dadok 45' | Łączy nas piłka 90minut | Alves 10' | Stadium: Stadion Stali; Attendance: 0 Referee: Damian Sylwestrzak (Wrocław) |
| | Penalties |
| | Getinger (penalty scored); Forsell (penalty scored); Kościelny (penalty scored); Mak (penalty missed); Gliwa (penalty missed) | | (penalty scored) Świerczok; (penalty scored) Badía; (penalty scored) Chrapek; (penalty scored) Malarczyk |
Note: Match originally scheduled on 31 October 2020, 18:30 CET (UTC+01:00) was postponed due to COVID-19 disease detection in Piast Gliwice team.
