= 2020–21 Piast Gliwice season =

Piast Gliwice
2020-21 season
- Chairman: Paweł Żelem
- Manager: Waldemar Fornalik
- Stadium: Stadion Miejski, Gliwice
- Ekstraklasa: 6th
- Polish Cup: Semi-finals
- UEFA Europa League: Third qualifying round
- Top goalscorer: League: Jakub Świerczok (14 goals); All: Jakub Świerczok (16 goals)
- Biggest win: 4–0 v Resovia (PC)
- Biggest defeat: 1–4 v Lech Poznań (EKS); 0–3 v Copenhagen (UEL)
Home colours	Away colours	Third colours
- All statistics correct as of 27 November 2020.

In the 2020–21 season, Piast Gliwice competed in Ekstraklasa and this season's edition of the Polish Cup. They competed in the UEFA Europa League qualifying phase, but were eliminated in the third qualifying round, following the 3–0 defeat to Copenhagen.

== Players ==
As of 10 October 2020

Note: Flags indicate national team as defined under FIFA eligibility rules; some limited exceptions apply. Players may hold more than one non-FIFA nationality.

No.	Pos.	Nation	Player
1	GK	POL	Jakub Szmatuła
2	DF	DEN	Mikkel Kirkeskov
3	MF	POL	Tomasz Jodłowiec
4	DF	POL	Jakub Czerwiński
5	DF	SVK	Tomáš Huk
6	DF	POL	Michał Chrapek
7	MF	POR	Tiago Alves
10	MF	HUN	Kristopher Vida
11	FW	POL	Michał Żyro
12	GK	POL	Patryk Królczyk
14	MF	SVK	Jakub Holúbek
16	FW	POL	Dominik Steczyk (on loan from Nürnberg)
17	MF	POL	Patryk Lipski
18	MF	POL	Patryk Sokołowski

No.	Pos.	Nation	Player
19	MF	POL	Sebastian Milewski
20	DF	POL	Martin Konczkowski
21	MF	ESP	Gerard Badía (captain)
22	DF	POL	Tomasz Mokwa
23	MF	POL	Javier Hyjek
26	GK	SVK	František Plach
28	DF	POL	Bartosz Rymaniak
29	MF	POL	Remigiusz Borkała
33	GK	POL	Karol Szymański
34	DF	POL	Piotr Malarczyk
67	MF	POL	Michał Rakowiecki
70	FW	POL	Jakub Świerczok (on loan from Ludogorets Razgrad)
77	FW	POL	Arkadiusz Pyrka
99	FW	POL	Karol Stanek

== Competitions ==
=== Ekstraklasa ===
==== Standings ====
Pos	Team	Pld	W	D	L	GF	GA	GD	Pts	Qualification or relegation
4	Śląsk Wrocław	30	11	10	9	36	32	+4	43 (Note: Head-to-head points: Śląsk Wrocław 6, Warta Poznań 0.)	Qualification for the Europa Conference League first qualifying round
5	Warta Poznań	30	13	4	13	33	32	+1	43	
6	Piast Gliwice	30	11	9	10	39	32	+7	42 (Note: Head-to-head points: Piast Gliwice 4, Lechia Gdańsk 1.)	
7	Lechia Gdańsk	30	12	6	12	40	37	+3	42	
8	Zagłębie Lubin	30	11	8	11	38	40	−2	41	

Source: ekstraklasa.org
Rules for classification: 1) Points; 2) Head-to-head points; 3) Head-to-head goal difference; 4) Head-to-head goals scored; 5) Head-to-head away goals scored (only if between two teams); 6) Goal difference; 7) Goals scored; 8) Number of wins; 9) Number of away wins; 10) Fairplay ranking; 11) Draw

=== Polish Cup ===
15 August 2020 Round of 64	Resovia	0–4	Piast Gliwice	Rzeszów
16:30 CEST (UTC+02:00)		Łączy nas piłka 90minut	Parzyszek 8' (pen.); Steczyk 45' (pen.); Pyrka 88', 90'	Stadium: Stadion Resovii; Attendance: 712; Referee: Mariusz Złotek (Stalowa Wola)

2 December 2020 Round of 32	Stal Mielec	1–1 (a.e.t.) (3–4 p)	Piast Gliwice	Mielec
17:40 CET (UTC+01:00)	Dadok 45'	Łączy nas piłka 90minut	Alves 10'	Stadium: Stadion Stali; Attendance: 0 Referee: Damian Sylwestrzak (Wrocław)
	Penalties
	Getinger (penalty scored); Forsell (penalty scored); Kościelny (penalty scored); Mak (penalty missed); Gliwa (penalty missed)		(penalty scored) Świerczok; (penalty scored) Badía; (penalty scored) Chrapek; (penalty scored) Malarczyk
Note: Match originally scheduled on 31 October 2020, 18:30 CET (UTC+01:00) was postponed due to COVID-19 disease detection in Piast Gliwice team.

=== UEFA Europa League ===
==== Qualifying phase ====
===== First qualifying round =====
27 August 2020
17:00 (18:00 FET)

Dinamo Minsk (Belarus)	0–2	(Poland) Piast Gliwice
	Report	Lipski 10'; Świerczok 56'

Dinamo Stadium, Minsk
Attendance: 0
Referee: Lazar Lukić (Serbia)

===== Second qualifying round =====
17 September 2020
20:00

Piast Gliwice (Poland)	3–2	(Austria) Hartberg
Konczkowski 10'; Sokołowski 62'; Żyro 84'	Report	Kainz 33'; Ried 75'

Stadion Miejski, Gliwice
Attendance: 0
Referee: Erik Lambrechts (Belgium)

===== Third qualifying round =====
24 September 2020
20:00

Copenhagen (Denmark)	3–0	(Poland) Piast Gliwice
Wilczek 14'; Wind 58'; Biel 90+3'	Report

Parken Stadium, Copenhagen
Attendance: 0
Referee: Roi Reinshreiber (Israel)
