= 2019 Polish Super Cup =

Football competition

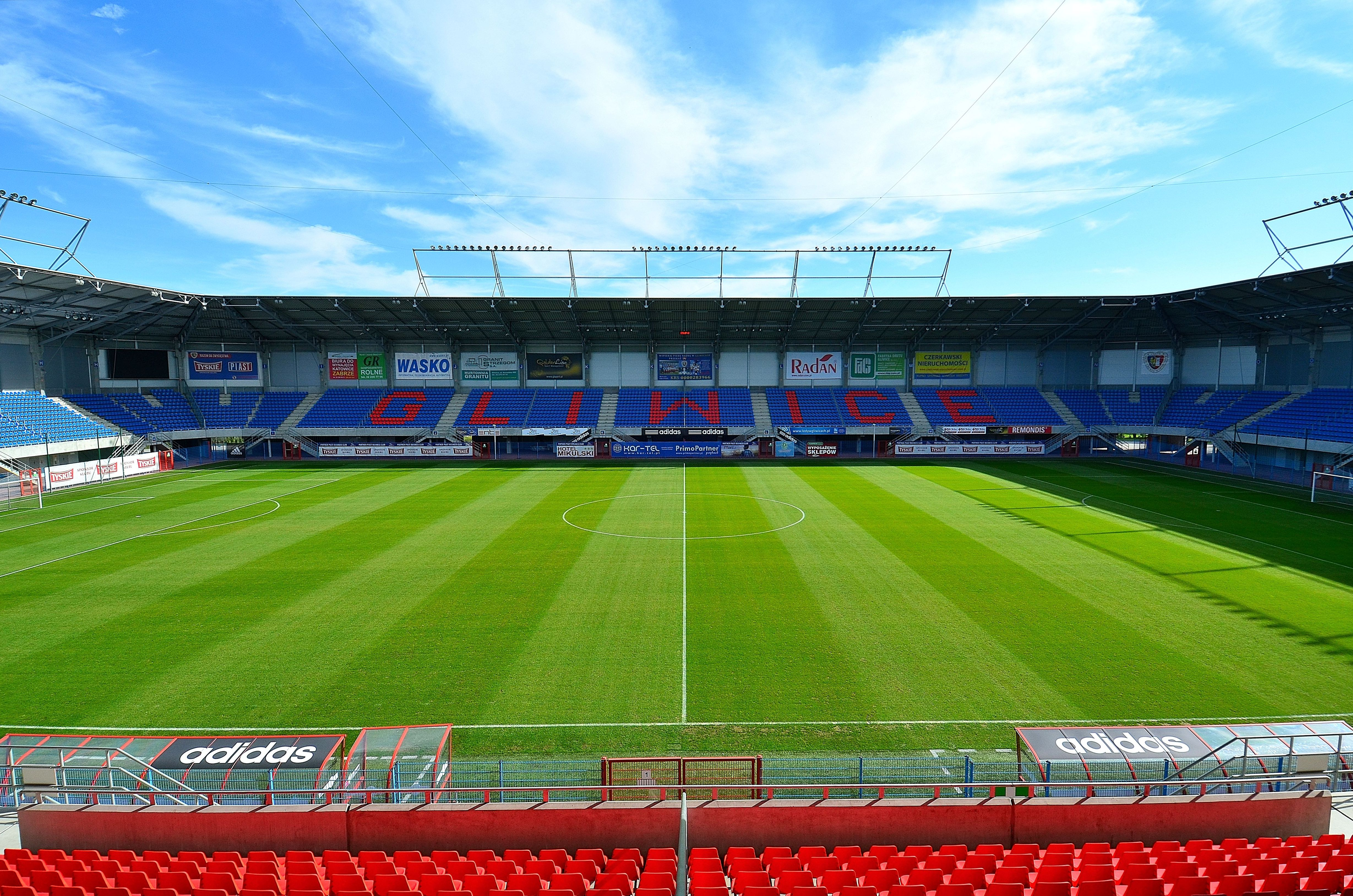
- The Piotr Wieczorek Municipal Stadium in Gliwice hosted the final.
Piast Gliwice	Lechia Gdańsk
1	3
- Date: 13 July 2019
- Venue: Stadion Miejski, Gliwice
- Referee: Paweł Raczkowski (Warsaw)
- Attendance: 6,791
- Weather: 17 °C (63 °F)

The 2019 Polish Super Cup was the 28th Polish Super Cup, an annual Polish football match played between the reigning winners of the Ekstraklasa and Polish Cup. It was held on 13 July 2019 between the 2018–19 Ekstraklasa champions Piast Gliwice and the 2018–19 Polish Cup winners Lechia Gdańsk at the home of the Ekstraklasa champions Piast, the Stadion Miejski in Gliwice. Piast played their first ever Super Cup match, while Lechia played their second ever and the first since 1983. This was the first Super Cup match since 2010 to not feature Legia Warsaw.

Lechia won 3–1 to secure their second Super Cup title.

== Match ==
13 July 2019
20:30 CEST (UTC+02:00)

Piast Gliwice	1–3	Lechia Gdańsk
Sokołowski 68'	Report; Report	Haraslín 2', 47'; Kubicki 21'

Stadion Miejski, Gliwice
Attendance: 6,791
Referee: Paweł Raczkowski (Warsaw)

Piast Gliwice	Lechia Gdańsk

GK	1	(Poland) Jakub Szmatuła
RB	22	(Poland) Tomasz Mokwa
CB	23	(Slovakia) Tomáš Huk
CB	4	(Poland) Jakub Czerwiński
LB	2	(Denmark) Mikkel Kirkeskov
RM	21	(Spain) Gerard Badía (c)
CM	19	(Poland) Sebastian Milewski		(substituted off) 90+2'
CM	6	(England) Tom Hateley		(substituted off) 62'
LM	14	(Slovakia) Jakub Holúbek		(substituted off) 46'
CF	11	(Spain) Jorge Félix		(substituted off) 83'
CF	9	(Poland) Piotr Parzyszek		(substituted off) 63'
Substitutes:
GK	26	(Slovakia) František Plach
DF	20	(Poland) Martin Konczkowski		(substituted on) 83'
DF	88	(Slovenia) Uroš Korun		(substituted on) 90+2'
MF	17	(Ecuador) Joel Valencia	(yellow card) 90+3'	(substituted on) 46'
MF	18	(Poland) Patryk Sokołowski		(substituted on) 62'
MF	29	(Poland) Remigiusz Borkała
FW	90	(Spain) Dani Aquino		(substituted on) 63'
Manager:
(Poland) Waldemar Fornalik

GK	12	(Slovakia) Dušan Kuciak
RB	19	(Poland) Karol Fila	(yellow card) 73'
CB	23	(Croatia) Mario Maloča
CB	26	(Poland) Błażej Augustyn	(yellow card) 61'
LB	22	(Serbia) Filip Mladenović		(substituted off) 88'
CM	35	(Poland) Daniel Łukasik
CM	6	(Poland) Jarosław Kubicki	(yellow card) 77'
RM	17	(Slovakia) Lukáš Haraslín		(substituted off) 66'
AM	7	(Poland) Maciej Gajos		(substituted off) 73'
LM	31	(Serbia) Žarko Udovičić	(yellow card) 64'	(substituted off) 90+6'
CF	28	(Portugal) Flávio Paixão (c)		(substituted off) 59'
Substitutes:
GK	1	(Serbia) Zlatan Alomerović
DF	25	(Poland) Michał Nalepa		(substituted on) 88'
MF	9	(Poland) Patryk Lipski
MF	10	(Indonesia) Egy Maulana		(substituted on) 90+6'
MF	21	(Poland) Sławomir Peszko		(substituted on) 66'
MF	36	(Poland) Tomasz Makowski		(substituted on) 73'
FW	90	(Poland) Artur Sobiech		(substituted on) 59'
Manager:
(Poland) Piotr Stokowiec

Assistant referees:
Michał Obukowicz
Marcin Borkowski
Fourth official:
Krzysztof Jakubik
Video assistant referee:
Tomasz Kwiatkowski
Tomasz Listkiewicz

Match rules

- 90 minutes.
- Penalty shoot-out if scores still level.
- Seven named substitutes.
- Maximum of five substitutions.

== See also ==
- 2019–20 Ekstraklasa
- 2019–20 Polish Cup
