= 2025–26 Śląsk Wrocław season =

Śląsk Wrocław
2025–26 season
- Manager: Ante Šimundža
- Stadium: Wrocław Stadium
- 1 Liga: 2nd (promoted)
- Polish Cup: Round of 16
- Top goalscorer: League: Przemysław Banaszak (16); All: Przemysław Banaszak (16)
- Biggest win: Polonia Warsaw 0–4 Śląsk Wrocław; Górnik Łęczna 0–4 Śląsk Wrocław
- Biggest defeat: Wisła Kraków 5–0 Śląsk Wrocław

The 2025–26 season was the 80th in the history of Śląsk Wrocław and the first spent in the Polish second division, 1 liga, since 2008, after the club's relegation. In the Polish Cup, Śląsk Wrocław was eliminated in the round of 16 by Raków Częstochowa, losing 1–2.

== Transfers ==
=== In ===
Pos.	Player	Transferred from	Fee	Date	Source
DF	(Austria) Marko Dijaković	(Poland) GKS Tychy	Free	1 July 2025	
MF	(Poland) Maksymilian Dziuba	(Poland) Lech Poznań	Loan	1 July 2025	
MF	(Kosovo) Besar Halimi	(Germany) SV Sandhausen	Free	1 July 2025	
DF	(Poland) Mariusz Malec	(Poland) Pogoń Szczecin	Free	1 July 2025	
FW	(Bosnia and Herzegovina) Luka Marjanac	(Slovenia) ND Gorica	Free	1 July 2025	
GK	(Poland) Michał Szromnik	(Poland) Górnik Zabrze	Free	1 July 2025	
FW	(Poland) Damian Warchoł	(Poland) Górnik Łęczna	Free	1 July 2025	
MF	(Poland) Patryk Sokołowski	(Poland) Cracovia	Free	7 July 2025	
MF	(Venezuela) Jorge Yriarte	(Spain) Eibar	Undisclosed	12 July 2025	
FW	(Poland) Przemysław Banaszak	(Poland) Górnik Łęczna	Undisclosed	16 July 2025	
DF	(Poland) Michał Rosiak	(England) Arsenal U21	Free	3 September 2025	
MF	(Poland) Antoni Klimek	(Poland) Puszcza Niepołomice	Loan	8 September 2025	
DF	(Mauritania) Lamine Ba	(Croatia) Varaždin	€150,000	27 January 2026	
FW	(Slovakia) Timotej Jambor	(Romania) Rapid București	Loan	11 February 2026	

=== Out ===
Pos.	Player	Transferred to	Fee	Date	Source
MF	(Romania) Tudor Băluță	(Romania) Universitatea Craiova	Free	1 July 2025	
MF	(Turkey) Burak İnce	(Saudi Arabia) Al-Okhdood	Released	1 July 2025	
GK	(Poland) Rafał Leszczyński	(Poland) Wisła Płock	Undisclosed	1 July 2025	
GK	(Poland) Tomasz Loska	(Poland) Górnik Zabrze	Free	1 July 2025	
DF	(Poland) Aleksander Paluszek	(Poland) GKS Katowice	Free	1 July 2025	
MF	(Spain) José Ángel Pozo	(Poland) Pogoń Szczecin	€40,000	1 July 2025	
MF	(Bulgaria) Sylvester Jasper	(Serbia) Železničar Pančevo	Undisclosed	3 July 2025	
FW	(Palestine) Assad Al Hamlawi	(Romania) Universitatea Craiova	€1,000,000	8 July 2025	
FW	(Norway) Henrik Udahl	(Norway) Hamarkameratene	Loan return	11 July 2025	
DF	(Bulgaria) Aleks Petkov	(Greece) Kifisia	Undisclosed	13 August 2025	
MF	(Spain) Arnau Ortiz	(Spain) Atlético Madrileño	€300,000	1 September 2025	
FW	(Poland) Mateusz Żukowski	(Germany) 1. FC Magdeburg	€250,000	1 September 2025	
MF	(Poland) Jakub Jezierski	(Czech Republic) Sigma Olomouc	€300,000	16 January 2026	
DF	(Poland) Serafin Szota	(Poland) Arka Gdynia	Undisclosed	26 January 2026	
MF	(Poland) Aleksander Wolczek	(Poland) Sandecja Nowy Sącz	Loan	26 January 2026	
MF	(Kosovo) Besar Halimi	(Morocco) Raja Club Athletic	Free	28 January 2026	
DF	(Poland) Tommaso Guercio	(Italy) Carrarese	Loan	2 February 2026	

== Pre-season and friendlies ==
21 June 2025 Friendly	Barycz Milicz (Poland)	0–17	(Poland) Śląsk Wrocław
16:00

27 June 2025 Friendly	Śląsk Wrocław (Poland)	2–0	(Slovakia) Košice
12:00

2 July 2025 Friendly	Śląsk Wrocław (Poland)	3–2	(Poland) Chrobry Głogów
17:00

5 July 2025 Friendly	Śląsk Wrocław (Poland)	3–2	(Czech Republic) Pardubice
16:00

12 July 2025 Friendly	Śląsk Wrocław (Poland)	1–2	(Czech Republic) Hradec Králové
18:00

10 January 2026 Friendly	Śląsk Wrocław (Poland)	2–2	(Poland) Ślęza Wrocław
12:00

14 January 2026 Friendly	Śląsk II Wrocław (Poland)	3–4	(Poland) Śląsk Wrocław
12:00

18 January 2026 Friendly	Śląsk Wrocław (Poland)	1–2	(Poland) Podbeskidzie Bielsko-Biała
12:30

23 January 2026 Friendly	Śląsk Wrocław (Poland)	4–0	(Poland) Rekord Bielsko-Biała
12:00

31 January 2026 Friendly	Śląsk Wrocław (Poland)	2–2	(Poland) Zagłębie Lubin
14:00

== Competitions ==
=== 1 Liga ===
Pos	Team	Pld	W	D	L	GF	GA	GD	Pts	Promotion or Relegation
1	Wisła Kraków (C, P)	34	20	11	3	72	32	+40	71	Promotion to Ekstraklasa
2	Śląsk Wrocław (P)	34	17	11	6	69	47	+22	62	Promotion to Ekstraklasa
3	Wieczysta Kraków (O, P)	34	16	9	9	70	47	+23	57	Qualification for promotion play-offs
4	Chrobry Głogów	34	16	7	11	48	36	+12	55	Qualification for promotion play-offs
5	ŁKS Łódź	34	15	9	10	56	48	+8	54	Qualification for promotion play-offs

Source: 1liga.org, 90minut.pl
Rules for classification: 1) Points; 2) Head-to-head points; 3) Head-to-head goal difference; 4) Goal difference; 6) Goals scored; 7) Number of wins; 8) Number of away wins.
(Note: Head-to-head record is used only after all the matches between the teams in question have been played)
(C) Champions; (O) Play-off winner; (P) Promoted

Overall								Home						Away					
Pld	W	D	L	GF	GA	GD	Pts	W	D	L	GF	GA	GD	W	D	L	GF	GA	GD
34	17	11	6	69	47	+22	62	10	6	1	33	16	+17	7	5	5	36	31	+5

Round	1	2	3	4	5	6	7	8	9	10	11	12	13	14	15	16	17	18	19	20	21	22	23	24	25	26	27	28	29	30	31	32	33	34
Ground	H	A	H	H	A	A	A	H	H	A	H	A	H	H	A	H	A	A	H	A	A	H	H	H	A	A	H	A	H	A	A	H	A	H
Result	D	L	W	W	D	W	L	W	W	W	D	L	W	W	L	L	D	D	D	D	L	W	W	W	W	D	W	W	D	W	W	D	W	D
Position	7	13	9	4	5	3	5	3	3	2	3	4	2	2	3	5	5	6	7	8	9	8	6	4	3	3	2	2	2	2	2	2	2	2

A = Away; H = Home; W = Win; D = Draw; L = Loss

==== Matches ====
18 July 2025 1	Śląsk Wrocław	1–1	Wieczysta Kraków	Wrocław
18:00	Sokołowski 13'		Román 90+4'	Stadium: Wrocław Stadium; Attendance: 19,629; Referee: Patryk Gryckiewicz

25 July 2025 2	Stal Rzeszów	2–1	Śląsk Wrocław	Rzeszów
20:30	Jonathan 28' (pen.); Lyczko 57'		Dijaković (red card) 22'; Szota 33' (pen.)	Stadium: Stal Rzeszów Municipal Stadium; Attendance: 5,571; Referee: Mateusz Jenda

3 August 2025 3	Śląsk Wrocław	3–1	Ruch Chorzów
14:30

8 August 2025 4	Śląsk Wrocław	3–1	Miedź Legnica
20:30

17 August 2025 5	Odra Opole	1–1	Śląsk Wrocław
14:30

20 August 2025 6	Chrobry Głogów	1–2	Śląsk Wrocław
18:00

24 August 2025 7	Wisła Kraków	5–0	Śląsk Wrocław
14:30

29 August 2025 8	Śląsk Wrocław	2–1	GKS Tychy
18:00

13 September 2025 9	Śląsk Wrocław	2–0	Puszcza Niepołomice
19:30

20 September 2025 10	Pogoń Siedlce	2–3	Śląsk Wrocław
19:30

26 September 2025 11	Śląsk Wrocław	1–1	Polonia Warsaw
20:30

4 October 2025 12	Znicz Pruszków	2–1	Śląsk Wrocław
19:30

19 October 2025 13	Śląsk Wrocław	2–1	Stal Mielec
14:30

25 October 2025 14	Śląsk Wrocław	3–1	Górnik Łęczna
19:30

3 November 2025 15	ŁKS Łódź	2–1	Śląsk Wrocław
18:45

9 November 2025 16	Śląsk Wrocław	2–3	Polonia Bytom
14:30

21 November 2025 17	Pogoń Grodzisk Mazowiecki	2–2	Śląsk Wrocław
20:30

30 November 2025 18	Wieczysta Kraków	3–3	Śląsk Wrocław
14:30

8 December 2025 19	Śląsk Wrocław	1–1	Stal Rzeszów
19:00

8 February 2026 20	Ruch Chorzów	2–2	Śląsk Wrocław
14:30

14 February 2026 21	Miedź Legnica	3–1	Śląsk Wrocław
19:30

22 February 2026 22	Śląsk Wrocław	3–0	Odra Opole
14:30

28 February 2026 23	Śląsk Wrocław	2–1	Chrobry Głogów
19:30

7 March 2026 24	Śląsk Wrocław	3–0; Awarded	Wisła Kraków
17:30

15 March 2026 25	GKS Tychy	2–4	Śląsk Wrocław
14:30

21 March 2026 26	Puszcza Niepołomice	1–1	Śląsk Wrocław
19:30

4 April 2026 27	Śląsk Wrocław	1–0	Pogoń Siedlce
19:30

10 April 2026 28	Polonia Warsaw	0–4	Śląsk Wrocław
18:00

18 April 2026 29	Śląsk Wrocław	2–2	Znicz Pruszków
13:00

25 April 2026 30	Stal Mielec	2–3	Śląsk Wrocław
19:30

1 May 2026 31	Górnik Łęczna	0–4	Śląsk Wrocław
20:30

11 May 2026 32	Śląsk Wrocław	2–2	ŁKS Łódź
18:30

17 May 2026 33	Polonia Bytom	1–3	Śląsk Wrocław
20:15

24 May 2026 34	Śląsk Wrocław	0–0	Pogoń Grodzisk Mazowiecki
16:30

=== Polish Cup ===
30 September 2025 First round	Lechia Tomaszów Mazowiecki	1–2	Śląsk Wrocław
18:00

28 October 2025 Round of 32	Olimpia Grudziądz	0–1	Śląsk Wrocław
14:30

3 December 2025 Round of 16	Śląsk Wrocław	1–2	Raków Częstochowa
17:30
