= Aleksandar Kolev =

Bulgarian footballer (born 1992)

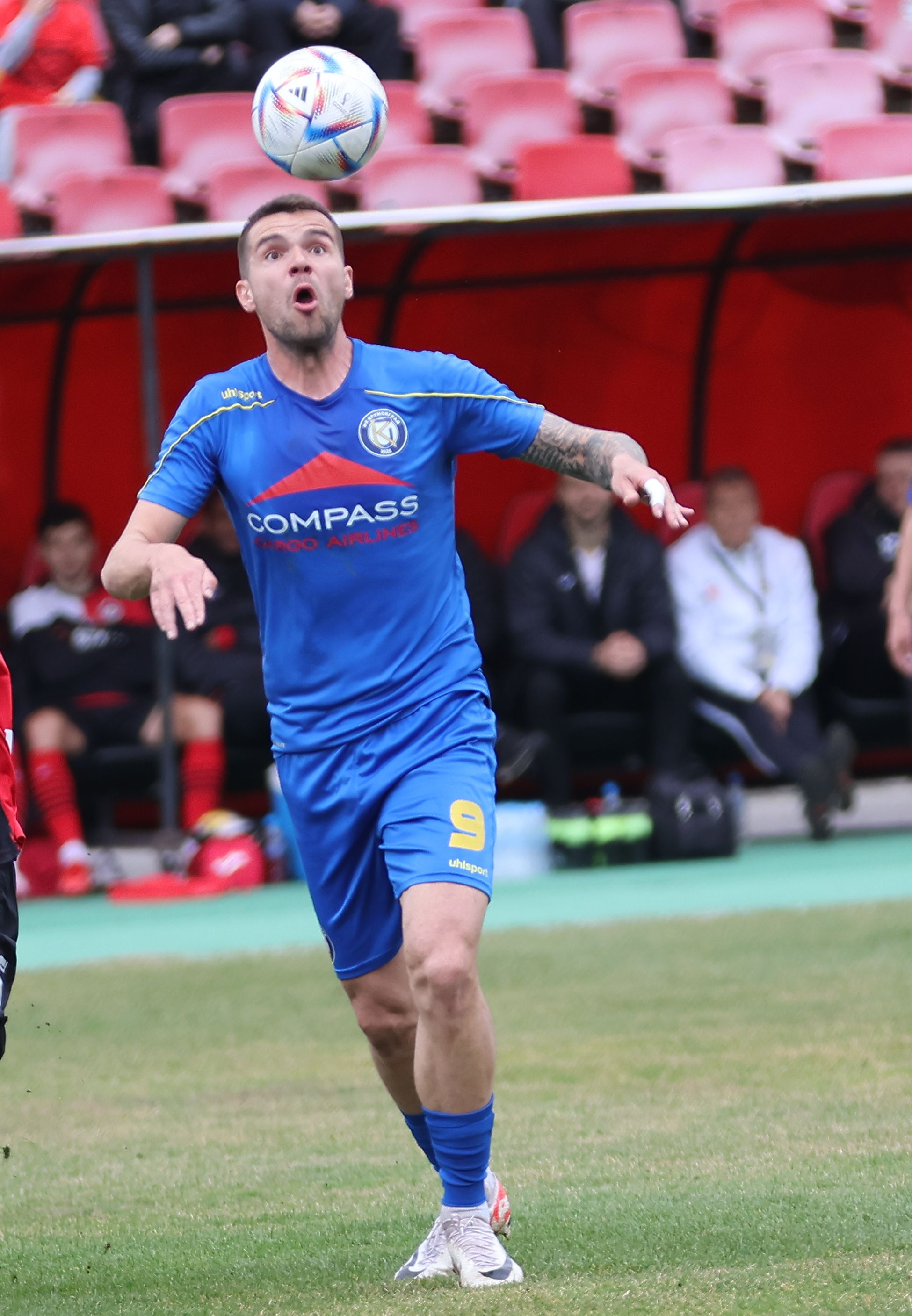

Personal information
- Full name: Aleksandar Lyubomirov Kolev
- Date of birth: 8 December 1992 (age 33)
- Place of birth: Turnhout, Belgium
- Height: 1.92 m (6 ft 4 in)
- Position: Forward

Team information
- Current team: Cherno More
- Number: 20

Youth career
- –2007: Levski Sofia
- 2007–2010: Dessel Sport

Senior career*
Years	Team	Apps	(Gls)
2010–2013	Dessel Sport	63	(5)
2013–2014	ASV Geel	31	(7)
2014–2015	Botev Plovdiv	29	(3)
2016	ASV Geel	5	(0)
2016	Beroe	11	(0)
2017	Stal Mielec	15	(7)
2017–2018	Sandecja	32	(7)
2018–2019	Arka Gdynia	19	(1)
2019	Raków Częstochowa	8	(0)
2020	Kaisar	11	(0)
2021	Stal Mielec	22	(3)
2022–2023	CSKA 1948	37	(11)
2022	CSKA 1948 II	2	(1)
2023–2024	Krumovgrad	33	(15)
2024–2025	Levski Sofia	29	(9)
2025–2026	Nantong Zhiyun	25	(8)
2026–	Cherno More	5	(0)

International career^{‡}
2012–2015	Bulgaria U21	10	(5)
2023–	Bulgaria	15	(2)
- * Club domestic league appearances and goals as of 05:00, 13 October 2026 (UTC) ‡ National team caps and goals as of 7 September 2025

Aleksandar Kolev (Bulgarian: Александър Колев; born 8 December 1992) is a Bulgarian professional footballer who plays as a forward for First League club Cherno More Varna and the Bulgaria national team.

== Club career ==
=== Early career ===
Born in Belgium to Bulgarian parents, Kolev began his career in his country of origin, at Levski Sofia's youth academy. He returned to his country of birth with his family when he was 15 years old and joined local side Dessel Sport.

Kolev made his first team debut for Dessel Sport in a 2–1 home win over K.S.V. Oudenaarde on 12 February 2011. One month later, he scored his first goal in a 2–2 away draw against Olsa Brakel.

After good seasons in Dessel, Kolev joined Belgian Second Division team ASV Geel. He made his debut for the team in a match against White Star Bruxelles

=== Botev Plovdiv ===
On 4 August 2014, Kolev signed a contract with Botev Plovdiv. He made his debut five days later, when he came in as an 86-minute substitute at the dramatic 3–3 draw against Litex Lovech. Kolev was included at the starting lineup of the match for the Bulgarian Supercup against Ludogorets Razgrad. Unfortunately, he received a red card at the end of the first half. Kolev scored his first goal for Botev on 23 September 2014, when he came on as a substitute and scored the third goal in a 4–0 away win against Lokomotiv Mezdra in the first round of the Bulgarian Cup. On 28 October, Kolev scored again in the next round of the Bulgarian Cup tournament. He scored a late equaliser in the derby game against Lokomotiv Plovdiv. On 8 November, Kolev scored the winning goal in a 2–1 away win over Litex Lovech. He was seriously injured in the beginning of the away game with Slavia on 29 November. Soon after that it was confirmed that the injury will rule him out for six months. On 23 May 2015, after a long absence due to an injury, Kolev was included is the squad for the 1–2 away defeat from Beroe Stara Zagora but remained an unused substitute. A week later he came on as a substitute in the final minutes of the last game of the season, 0–2 defeat from Lokomotiv Sofia.

On 25 July 2015, Kolev missed a penalty in the first half of a 6–0 away defeat at Montana. In the following game, the local derby with Lokomotiv Plovdiv, he scored a nice goal after an assist by Mariyan Ognyanov. On 9 August, Kolev scored the winning goal against Pirin Blagoevgrad. He was selected for the man of the match and his goal was chosen for the best goal of the round. Furthermore, Kolev won the award for the best player of the 4th round in A Grupa. Nikolay Kostov, the manager of Botev Plovdiv, decided that Kolev was no longer needed by the club. On 3 February 2016, after playing in 33 official games and scoring five goals, Kolev was released on a free transfer.

=== Sandecja Nowy Sącz ===
Kolev was signed by Sandecja Nowy Sącz for free in the beginning of the 2017 summer transfer window and made his debut for the club on 16 July 2017, in a goalless draw against Lech Poznań. His first goal for the club came in a 3–1 away win against Jagiellonia Białystok on 6 August 2017. He scored a decisive brace against Pogoń Szczecin on 27 August 2017, leading his team to victory in a 2–1 home win.

=== Stal Mielec ===
On 5 January 2021, Kolev signed for Stal Mielec on a contract until the end of the 2020–21 season. On 14 January 2022, he left the club by mutual consent.

=== Krumovgrad ===
In June 2023, Kolev signed a contract with newly promoted Krumovgrad. He finished the season as the top scorer in the league, having netted 15 goals.

== International career ==
In August 2012, Kolev was called up for the Bulgaria U21 squad. He made his debut in a 1–1 friendly draw against Macedonia U21 on 14 November 2012.

In September 2013, Kolev scored during a 3–1 away defeat of the Bulgaria U21 from Russia U21.

Kolev scored a goal for Bulgaria U21 in a 2–2 draw with Estonia U21 on 3 September 2014.

While Kolev was playing for Botev Plovdiv, he was included twice in the senior national team, but he did not participate in any official games. On 16 November 2023, he earned his first cap after coming on as a second-half substitute for Martin Minchev in a 2–2 home draw with Hungary in a Euro 2024 qualifier.

== Career statistics ==
=== Club ===
As of match played 27 June 2026

Appearances and goals by club, season and competition
Club	Season	League			National cup (Note: Includes Belgian Cup, Bulgarian Cup, Polish Cup)		Continental		Other		Total	
Club	Season	Division	Apps	Goals	Apps	Goals	Apps	Goals	Apps	Goals	Apps	Goals
Dessel Sport	2010–11	Belgian Third Division	14	3	0	0	—		—		14	3
Dessel Sport	2011–12	Belgian Third Division	26	1	1	0	—		—		27	1
Dessel Sport	2012–13	Belgian Second Division	23	1	2	0	—		—		25	1
Dessel Sport	Total		63	5	3	0	—		—		66	5
Geel	2013–14	Belgian Second Division	30	7	1	0	—		—		31	7
Geel	2014–15	Belgian Second Division	1	0	0	0	—		—		1	0
Geel	Total		31	7	1	0	—		—		32	7
Botev Plovdiv	2014–15	A Group	14	1	2	2	0	0	1 (Note: Appearance in Bulgarian Supercup)	0	17	3
Botev Plovdiv	2015–16	A Group	15	2	1	0	—		—		16	2
Botev Plovdiv	Total		29	3	3	2	0	0	1	0	33	5
Geel	2015–16	Belgian Second Division	5	0	0	0	—		—		5	0
Beroe	2016–17	Bulgarian First League	11	0	0	0	4 (Note: Appearance(s) in UEFA Europa League)	0	—		15	0
Stal Mielec	2016–17	I liga	15	7	0	0	—		—		15	7
Sandecja Nowy Sącz	2017–18	Ekstraklasa	32	7	1	1	—		—		33	8
Arka Gdynia	2018–19	Ekstraklasa	17	1	0	0	—		1 (Note: Appearance in Polish Super Cup)	0	18	1
Arka Gdynia	2019–20	Ekstraklasa	2	0	0	0	—		—		2	0
Arka Gdynia	Total		19	1	0	0	—		1	0	20	1
Raków Częstochowa	2019–20	Ekstraklasa	6	0	2	1	—		—		8	1
Kaisar	2019	Kazakhstan Premier League	11	0	0	0	—		1 (Note: Appearance in Kazakhstan Super Cup)	0	12	1
Kaisar	2020	Kazakhstan Premier League	0	0	0	0	1	0	—		1	0
Kaisar	Total		11	0	0	0	1	0	1	0	13	0
Stal Mielec	2020–21	Ekstraklasa	15	2	0	0	—		—		15	2
Stal Mielec	2021–22	Ekstraklasa	7	1	0	0	—		—		7	1
Stal Mielec	Total		22	3	0	0	—		—		22	3
CSKA 1948	2021–22	Bulgarian First League	13	9	0	0	—		—		13	9
CSKA 1948	2022–23	Bulgarian First League	24	2	5	1	—		—		29	3
CSKA 1948	Total		37	11	5	1	—		—		42	12
CSKA 1948 II	2022–23	Second League	2	1	0	0	—		—		2	1
Krumovgrad	2023–24	Bulgarian First League	33	15	1	0	—		—		34	15
Levski Sofia	2024–25	Bulgarian First League	29	9	1	0	—		—		30	9
Nantong Zhiyun	2025	China League One	15	7	0	0	—		—		15	7
Nantong Zhiyun	2026	China League One	10	1	0	0	—		—		10	1
Nantong Zhiyun	Total		25	8	0	0	—		—		25	8
Career total			370	77	17	6	5	0	3	0	395	85

=== International ===
As of match played 7 September 2025

Appearances and goals by national team and year
National team	Year	Apps	Goals
Bulgaria	2023	2	0
Bulgaria	2024	7	0
Bulgaria	2025	4	2
Total		15	2

Scores and results list Bulgaria's goal tally first, score column indicates score after each Kolev goal.

List of international goals scored by Aleksandar Kolev
No.	Date	Venue	Opponent	Score	Result	Competition
1	6 June 2025	Stadion Hristo Botev, Plovdiv, Bulgaria	Cyprus	1–0	2–2	Friendly
2	6 June 2025	Stadion Hristo Botev, Plovdiv, Bulgaria	Cyprus	2–1	2–2	Friendly

== Honours ==
Botev Plovdiv

- Bulgarian Supercup runner-up: 2014

Arka Gdynia

- Polish Super Cup: 2018

Individual

- Bulgarian First League top goalscorer: 2023–24
