= Kasprzak =

Kasprzak is a Polish surname. Notable people with the surname include:

- Anna Kasprzak (born 1989), Danish equestrian
- Bartłomiej Kasprzak (born 1993), Polish footballer
- Krzysztof Kasprzak (born 1984), Polish speedway rider
- Mieczysław Kasprzak (born 1953), Polish politician
- Robert Kasprzak (born 1987), Polish speedway rider
- Róża Kasprzak (born 1982), Polish athlete
- Urszula Kasprzak (born 1960), Polish singer
- Zdzisław Kasprzak (1910–1971), Polish basketball player
