= Sebastian Milewski =

Polish footballer

Personal information
- Date of birth: 30 April 1998 (age 28)
- Place of birth: Mława, Poland
- Height: 1.75 m (5 ft 9 in)
- Position: Midfielder

Team information
- Current team: GKS Katowice
- Number: 22

Youth career
- –2012: Mławianka Mława
- 2012–2014: Legionovia Legionowo

Senior career*
Years	Team	Apps	(Gls)
2014–2016	Legionovia Legionowo	42	(0)
2016–2019	Zagłębie Sosnowiec	60	(1)
2019–2021	Piast Gliwice	51	(4)
2021–2024	Arka Gdynia	84	(3)
2024–	GKS Katowice	42	(2)

International career
2016–2017	Poland U19	8	(0)
2017–2019	Poland U20	6	(0)
2019	Poland U21	1	(0)
- * Club domestic league appearances and goals as of 10:13, 30 May 2026 (UTC)

Sebastian Milewski (born 30 April 1998) is a Polish professional footballer who plays as a midfielder for Ekstraklasa club GKS Katowice.

== Club career ==
=== Early career and Legionovia Legionowo ===
Born in Mława, Milewski began playing football with his hometown club, Mławianka Mława. In 2012, he joined the youth system of Legionovia Legionowo.

Milewski made his senior debut in the II liga on 20 May 2015, less than a month after his seventeenth birthday. He subsequently established himself in Legionovia's senior team and made 42 league appearances for the club.

=== Zagłębie Sosnowiec ===
On 26 January 2017, Milewski signed a three-and-a-half-year contract with Zagłębie Sosnowiec. He became a regular member of the team during the 2017–18 season, in which Zagłębie finished second in the I liga and earned promotion to the Ekstraklasa.

Milewski made his Ekstraklasa debut during the following campaign. Zagłębie were relegated at the end of the 2018–19 season, after which he left the club. He recorded 60 league appearances and one goal during his time in Sosnowiec.

=== Piast Gliwice ===
On 5 June 2019, Milewski joined reigning Polish champions Piast Gliwice, signing a two-year contract.

His first competitive appearance for Piast came on 13 July 2019, when he started in a 3–1 defeat to Lechia Gdańsk in the 2019 Polish Super Cup. After the departure of Patryk Dziczek, Milewski gained a regular place in Piast's midfield during the 2019–20 season.

He also appeared for Piast in European qualifying competition. Across two league seasons with the Gliwice club, he made 51 Ekstraklasa appearances and scored four goals.

=== Arka Gdynia ===
Milewski joined Arka Gdynia in July 2021. An injury delayed his competitive debut until late September, but he later established himself as a regular member of the first team.

During the 2022–23 season, he recorded two goals and six assists. In total, Milewski played 89 competitive matches for Arka, including 84 league appearances, and scored three goals. He left the club when his contract expired on 30 June 2024.

=== GKS Katowice ===
On 4 July 2024, Milewski joined newly promoted Ekstraklasa club GKS Katowice on a free transfer. He signed an initial one-year contract which included an option for a further season.

Milewski made 18 league appearances and scored one goal during the 2024–25 season. On 5 June 2025, GKS exercised the extension option in his contract, retaining him for the following campaign.

In the 2025–26 Ekstraklasa season, he appeared in 24 league matches and scored once as GKS finished fifth, securing qualification for European competition.

On 15 May 2026, Milewski signed a new three-year contract with GKS, extending his stay until 30 June 2029.

In July 2026, he appeared in both legs of GKS Katowice's UEFA Conference League second qualifying round tie against MŠK Žilina. GKS advanced after winning the tie 4–3 on aggregate.

== International career ==
Milewski represented Poland at the under-19, under-20 and under-21 level. In August 2019, he was called up to the Poland under-21s for the 2021 UEFA Euro Under-21 qualifiers against Latvia and Estonia. He made one appearance for the under-21 side, finishing his youth international career with 15 appearances across the three age groups.

== Career statistics ==
As of match played 30 July 2026

Appearances and goals by club, season and competition
Club	Season	League			Polish Cup		Europe		Other		Total	
Club	Season	Division	Apps	Goals	Apps	Goals	Apps	Goals	Apps	Goals	Apps	Goals
Legionovia Legionowo	2014–15	II liga	4	0	0	0	—		—		4	0
Legionovia Legionowo	2015–16	II liga	23	0	2	0	—		—		25	0
Legionovia Legionowo	2016–17	II liga	15	0	1	0	—		—		16	0
Legionovia Legionowo	Total		42	0	3	0	—		—		45	0
Zagłębie Sosnowiec	2016–17	I liga	12	0	—		—		—		12	0
Zagłębie Sosnowiec	2017–18	I liga	25	1	1	0	—		—		26	1
Zagłębie Sosnowiec	2018–19	Ekstraklasa	23	0	1	0	—		—		24	0
Zagłębie Sosnowiec	Total		60	1	2	0	—		—		62	1
Piast Gliwice	2019–20	Ekstraklasa	33	2	2	0	0	0	1 (Note: Appearance in Polish Super Cup)	0	36	2
Piast Gliwice	2020–21	Ekstraklasa	18	2	1	0	2 (Note: Appearances in UEFA Europa League)	0	—		21	2
Piast Gliwice	Total		51	4	3	0	2	0	1	0	57	4
Arka Gdynia	2021–22	I liga	22	0	2	0	—		1 (Note: Appearance in I liga promotion play-offs)	0	25	0
Arka Gdynia	2022–23	I liga	31	2	1	0	—		—		32	2
Arka Gdynia	2023–24	I liga	29	1	2	0	—		1	0	32	1
Arka Gdynia	Total		82	3	5	0	—		2	0	89	3
GKS Katowice	2024–25	Ekstraklasa	18	1	2	0	—		—		20	1
GKS Katowice	2025–26	Ekstraklasa	24	1	3	0	—		—		27	1
GKS Katowice	2026–27	Ekstraklasa	0	0	0	0	2 (Note: Appearances in UEFA Conference League)	0	—		2	0
GKS Katowice	Total		42	2	5	0	2	0	—		49	2
Career total			277	10	18	0	4	0	3	0	302	10
