= Marcin Flis =

Polish footballer

Personal information
- Full name: Marcin Flis
- Date of birth: 10 February 1994 (age 32)
- Place of birth: Bychawa, Poland
- Height: 1.85 m (6 ft 1 in)
- Position: Centre-back

Team information
- Current team: Wisła Płock
- Number: 3

Youth career
- 2004–2006: Stok Zakrzówek
- 2006–2010: Sygnał Lublin
- 2010: Ruch Chorzów
- 2010–2012: GKS Bełchatów

Senior career*
Years	Team	Apps	(Gls)
2013–2015	GKS Bełchatów	41	(1)
2016–2018	Piast Gliwice	4	(0)
2016	→ GKS Katowice (loan)	8	(0)
2018–2019	Górnik Łęczna	10	(1)
2019–2020	Sandecja Nowy Sącz	56	(2)
2020–2022	Stal Mielec	55	(4)
2022–2023	Stal Mielec	26	(0)
2023–2024	ŁKS Łódź	17	(0)
2025–2026	Pogoń Siedlce	43	(18)
2026–	Wisła Płock	1	(1)

International career
2010–2011	Poland U17	5	(0)
2012	Poland U18	1	(0)
2012	Poland U19	2	(0)
2013	Poland U20	1	(0)
- * Club domestic league appearances and goals as of 12:14, 27 July 2026 (UTC)

Marcin Flis (born 10 February 1994) is a Polish professional footballer who plays as a centre-back for Ekstraklasa club Wisła Płock.

== Club career ==
On 18 August 2020, he signed with Ekstraklasa club Stal Mielec. On 29 August 2022, after remaining a free agent since 30 June, he rejoined Stal on a one-year contract, with an extension option.

On 3 July 2023, Flis joined another top flight side ŁKS Łódź on a two-year deal. He left the club by mutual consent on 4 July 2024.

On 10 January 2025, he signed with I liga club Pogoń Siedlce. In eighteen months, he scored 18 goals in 43 league appearances for Pogoń.

On 24 June 2026, Flis signed for Ekstraklasa club Wisła Płock on a deal until June 2028.

== Honours ==
GKS Bełchatów

- I liga: 2013–14

Individual

- I liga Player of the Month: May 2025
