= Piotr Janczukowicz =

Polish footballer (born 2000)

Personal information
- Full name: Piotr Marek Janczukowicz
- Date of birth: 29 January 2000 (age 26)
- Place of birth: Słupsk, Poland
- Height: 1.83 m (6 ft 0 in)
- Positions: Winger; forward

Team information
- Current team: Sandecja Nowy Sącz
- Number: 10

Youth career
- –2009: Gryf Słupsk
- 2009–2011: Sparta Sycewice
- 2011–2012: Pomorze Sopot
- 2012–2013: Sparta Sycewice
- APLG Gdańsk
- 2016: SV Böblingen
- 2017–2019: Stuttgarter Kickers

Senior career*
Years	Team	Apps	(Gls)
2019–2020	Olimpia Grudziądz	31	(5)
2021–2024	ŁKS Łódź	91	(12)
2022–2023	ŁKS Łódź II	5	(2)
2024–2025	Enosis Neon Paralimni	24	(4)
2025–2026	Chrobry Głogów	30	(3)
2026–	Sandecja Nowy Sącz	0	(0)
- * Club domestic league appearances and goals as of 20:59, 31 May 2026 (UTC)

Piotr Marek Janczukowicz (born 29 January 2000) is a Polish professional footballer who plays as a winger or forward for II liga club Sandecja Nowy Sącz.

== Career ==
Janczukowicz joined the youth academy of German side SV Böblingen at the age of sixteen. In 2017, he joined the youth academy of German side Stuttgarter Kickers. Subsequently, he signed for Polish side Olimpia Grudziądz in 2019, where he mainly played as a winger.

Following his stint there, he signed for Polish side ŁKS Łódź in 2021, helping the club achieve promotion from the second tier to the top flight. Polish news website wrote in 2023 that he was "emerging as a hero for ŁKS... although he has been a substitute... his contribution to the fight for promotion is invaluable". During the summer of 2024, he signed for Cypriot side Enosis Neon Paralimni.

On 22 July 2025, Janczukowicz returned to Poland and signed with I liga side Chrobry Głogów until the end of the season.

On 14 July 2026, he signed a two-year deal with II liga club Sandecja Nowy Sącz.

== Honours ==
ŁKS Łódź II

- III liga, group I: 2022–23
