= Bartosz Bajorek =

Polish footballer (born 2004)

Personal information
- Date of birth: 22 January 2004 (age 22)
- Place of birth: Staszów, Poland
- Height: 1.78 m (5 ft 10 in)
- Position: Forward

Team information
- Current team: Igloopol Dębica
- Number: 11

Youth career
- –2017: Pogoń Staszów
- 2017–2019: Stal Mielec

Senior career*
Years	Team	Apps	(Gls)
2019–2023	Stal Mielec II	41	(13)
2019–2021	Stal Mielec	1	(0)
2023–2024	Unia Tarnów	30	(1)
2025–2026	Sparta Kazimierza Wielka	29	(12)
2026–	Igloopol Dębica	17	(3)
- * Club domestic league appearances and goals as of 16:14, 30 June 2026 (UTC)

Bartosz Bajorek (born 22 January 2004) is a Polish professional footballer who plays as a forward for IV liga Subcarpathia club Igloopol Dębica.

== Career statistics ==
As of match played 13 June 2026

Appearances and goals by club, season and competition
Club	Season	League			Polish Cup		Continental		Other		Total	
Club	Season	Division	Apps	Goals	Apps	Goals	Apps	Goals	Apps	Goals	Apps	Goals
Stal Mielec II	2019–20	IV liga Subcarpathia	6	1	—		—		—		6	1
Stal Mielec II	2020–21	IV liga Subcarpathia	16	7	—		—		—		16	7
Stal Mielec II	2021–22	IV liga Subcarpathia	6	3	—		—		—		6	3
Stal Mielec II	2022–23	IV liga Subcarpathia	13	2	—		—		—		13	2
Stal Mielec II	Total		41	13	—		—		—		41	13
Stal Mielec	2019–20	I liga	1	0	0	0	—		—		1	0
Unia Tarnów	2022–23	III liga, group IV	12	0	—		—		—		12	0
Unia Tarnów	2023–24	III liga, group IV	18	1	—		—		—		18	1
Unia Tarnów	Total		30	1	—		—		—		30	1
Sparta Kazimierza Wielka	2024–25	IV liga Świętokrzyskie	17	9	—		—		—		17	9
Sparta Kazimierza Wielka	2025–26	III liga, group IV	12	3	—		—		—		12	3
Sparta Kazimierza Wielka	Total		29	12	—		—		—		29	12
Igloopol Dębica	2025–26	IV liga Subcarpathia	17	3	—		—		—		17	3
Career total			118	29	0	0	0	0	0	0	118	29

== Honours ==
Stal Mielec

- I liga: 2019–20

Unia Tarnów

- Polish Cup (Tarnów regionals): 2022–23

Sparta Kazimierza Wielka

- IV liga Świętokrzyskie: 2024–25
