= Bartłomiej Kasprzak =

Polish footballer (born 1993)

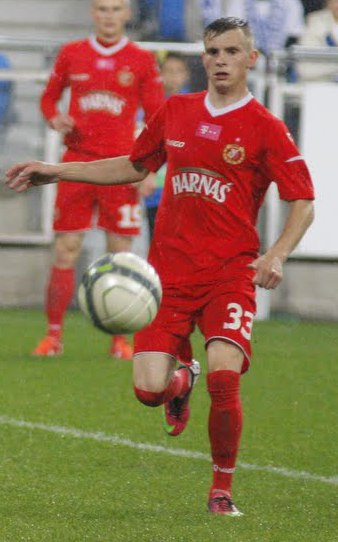
- Kasprzak with Widzew Łódź in 2013

Personal information
- Date of birth: 12 January 1993 (age 33)
- Place of birth: Nowy Targ, Poland
- Height: 1.72 m (5 ft 8 in)
- Position: Midfielder

Team information
- Current team: Sandecja Nowy Sącz
- Number: 33

Youth career
- Lubań Tylmanowa
- Garbarnia Kraków

Senior career*
Years	Team	Apps	(Gls)
2011–2012	Garbarnia Kraków	6	(0)
2012–2015	Widzew Łódź	50	(1)
2015–2023	Sandecja Nowy Sącz	172	(7)
2023–2024	Radunia Stężyca	27	(1)
2024–2025	Świt Szczecin	33	(2)
2025–	Sandecja Nowy Sącz	29	(0)

International career
2013	Poland U20	3	(0)
- * Club domestic league appearances and goals as of 14:21, 6 June 2026 (UTC)

Bartłomiej Kasprzak (born 12 January 1993) is a Polish professional footballer who plays as a midfielder for II liga club Sandecja Nowy Sącz.

== Honours ==
Garbarnia Kraków

- III liga Lesser Poland - Świętokrzyskie: 2010–11
- Polish Cup (Kraków regionals): 2010–11

Sandecja Nowy Sącz

- I liga: 2016–17
