= Wojciech Błyszko =

Polish footballer (born 1999)

Personal information
- Date of birth: 5 October 1999 (age 27)
- Place of birth: Drawsko Pomorskie, Poland
- Height: 1.97 m (6 ft 6 in)
- Position: Centre-back

Team information
- Current team: Sandecja Nowy Sącz
- Number: 47

Youth career
- –2014: Światowid Łobez
- 2014–2016: Pogoń Szczecin
- 2016–2017: Bałtyk Koszalin
- 2017–2018: Eintracht Braunschweig

Senior career*
| Years | Team | Apps | (Gls) |
| 2018–2019 | Błękitni Stargard | 24 | (0) |
| 2019–2021 | Jagiellonia Białystok | 3 | (0) |
| 2020–2021 | → Stal Mielec (loan) | 3 | (0) |
| 2021–2022 | Motor Lublin | 23 | (3) |
| 2022–2023 | Chojniczanka Chojnice | 5 | (0) |
| 2023 | Wisła Puławy | 14 | (0) |
| 2023–2024 | Znicz Pruszków | 23 | (0) |
| 2024–2025 | Odra Opole | 10 | (0) |
| 2025– | Sandecja Nowy Sącz | 26 | (0) |
- * Club domestic league appearances and goals as of 14:21, 6 June 2026 (UTC)

Wojciech Błyszko (born 5 October 1999) is a Polish professional footballer who plays as a centre-back for II liga club Sandecja Nowy Sącz.

== Club career ==
On 7 September 2020, he joined Stal Mielec on a season-long loan with an option to buy.

In June 2021, he signed for Motor Lublin on a one-year contract with an option for a second year.

On 2 June 2022, Błyszko moved to newly promoted I liga side Chojniczanka Chojnice on two-year deal with a one-year extension option. He left the club by mutual consent on 1 February 2023.

Two days later, Błyszko joined II liga club Wisła Puławy on a deal until the end of the season.

On 28 June 2023, Błyszko joined newly promoted I liga side Znicz Pruszków.

On 3 July 2024, he moved to another I liga outfit Odra Opole, signing a one-year deal with an option for another twelve months.

On 3 July 2025, Błyszko signed a two-year deal with third-tier side Sandecja Nowy Sącz.
