= Matthias Hamrol =

German footballer

Personal information
- Date of birth: 31 December 1993 (age 32)
- Place of birth: Troisdorf, Germany
- Height: 1.95 m (6 ft 5 in)
- Position: Goalkeeper

Youth career
- –2008: SF Troisdorf
- 2008–2011: Borussia Mönchengladbach
- 2011–2013: RB Leipzig

Senior career*
Years	Team	Apps	(Gls)
2013	RB Leipzig	0	(0)
2013–2015	VfL Wolfsburg II	6	(0)
2015–2016	SSV Reutlingen	28	(0)
2016	1. FC Köln	0	(0)
2016–2017	1. FC Köln II	18	(0)
2017–2019	Korona Kielce	31	(0)
2019–2020	FC Emmen	0	(0)
2020–2021	SV Wehen Wiesbaden	0	(0)
2021–2022	ZFC Meuselwitz	19	(0)
2022–2023	BFC Dynamo	12	(0)
- * Club domestic league appearances and goals as of 23:08, 30 December 2023 (UTC)

Matthias Hamrol (born 31 December 1993) is a German professional footballer who plays as a goalkeeper.

== Career ==
On 11 June 2019, Hamrol signed for Eredivisie club FC Emmen on a two-year deal with an option for an extra year.
