= Ślęza Wrocław =

Ślęza Wrocław can refer to:

- Ślęza Wrocław (women's basketball)
- Ślęza Wrocław (speedway)
