= Denis Gojko =

Polish footballer (born 1998)

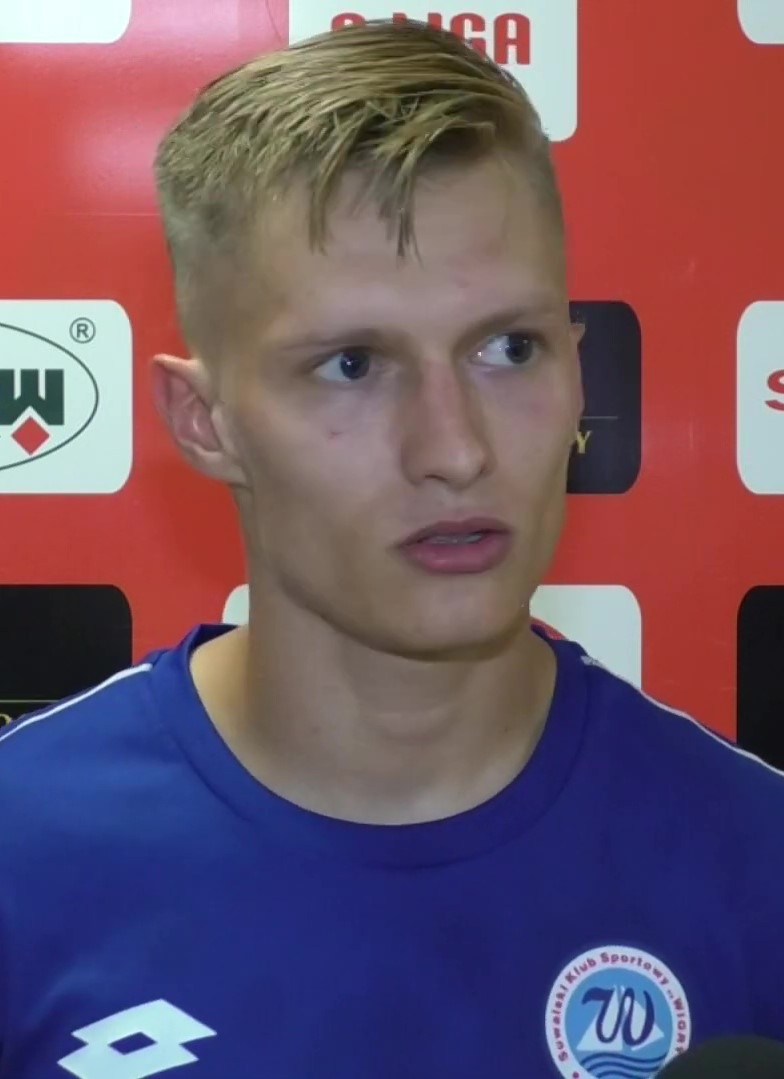
- Gojko with Wigry Suwałki in 2020

Personal information
- Full name: Denis Gojko
- Date of birth: 16 February 1998 (age 28)
- Place of birth: Gliwice, Poland
- Height: 1.76 m (5 ft 9 in)
- Position: Right winger

Team information
- Current team: LZS Starowice Dolne
- Number: 19

Youth career
- –2014: Piast Gliwice

Senior career*
Years	Team	Apps	(Gls)
2014–2016	Piast Gliwice II	16	(1)
2017–2020	Piast Gliwice	20	(1)
2019	→ Stal Mielec (loan)	7	(3)
2020	→ Wigry Suwałki (loan)	13	(2)
2020–2022	Wigry Suwałki	57	(8)
2022–2023	Olimpia Grudziądz	11	(2)
2023	Skra Częstochowa	3	(0)
2023–2024	Olimpia Zambrów	32	(4)
2024–2025	Stomil Olsztyn	33	(8)
2025–	LZS Starowice Dolne	27	(1)

International career
2013	Poland U16	2	(0)
2017–2018	Poland U20	5	(0)
- * Club domestic league appearances and goals as of 17:09, 4 June 2026 (UTC)

Denis Gojko (born 16 February 1998) is a Polish professional footballer who plays as a right winger for IV liga Opole club LZS Starowice Dolne.

== Career ==
Gojko was loaned out to Stal Mielec on 21 December 2018 for the rest of the season.

== Honours ==
Piast Gliwice

- Ekstraklasa: 2018–19
