= Maciej Domański =

Polish footballer

Personal information
- Date of birth: 5 September 1990 (age 36)
- Place of birth: Rzeszów, Poland
- Height: 1.68 m (5 ft 6 in)
- Position: Midfielder

Team information
- Current team: Stal Mielec
- Number: 10

Youth career
- Stal Rzeszów
- –2008: Stal Mielec
- 2009–2010: Polonia Warsaw

Senior career*
Years	Team	Apps	(Gls)
2008	Stal Mielec	4	(0)
2011	Stal Mielec	6	(1)
2011–2012	Radomiak Radom	22	(2)
2012–2015	Stal Mielec	77	(7)
2015–2016	Siarka Tarnobrzeg	19	(1)
2016–2018	Puszcza Niepołomice	74	(16)
2018–2020	Raków Częstochowa	28	(5)
2020–	Stal Mielec	182	(21)
- * Club domestic league appearances and goals as of 20:50, 26 May 2026 (UTC)

Maciej Domański (born 5 September 1990) is a Polish professional footballer who plays as a midfielder for and captains I liga club Stal Mielec.

== Honours ==
Radomiak Radom

- III liga Łódź–Masovia: 2011–12

Stal Mielec

- I liga: 2019–20
- III liga Lublin–Subcarpathia: 2012–13

Raków Częstochowa

- I liga: 2018–19
