= Kamil Kościelny =

Polish footballer (born 1991)

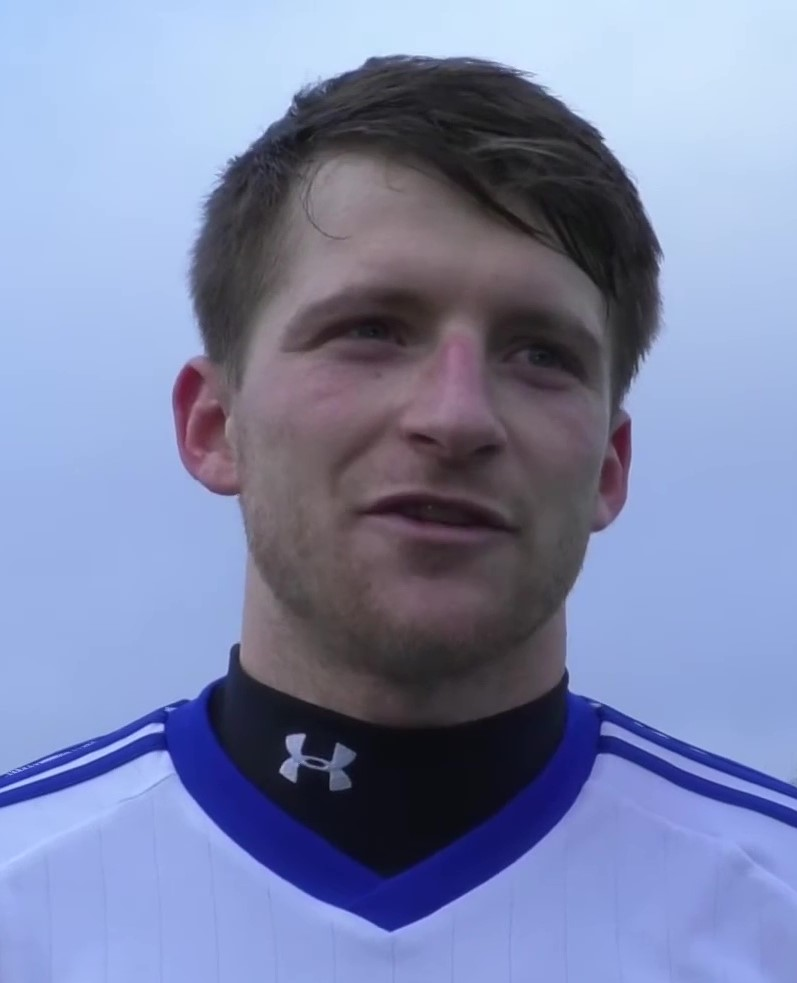
- Kościelny in 2018

Personal information
- Date of birth: 4 August 1991 (age 35)
- Place of birth: Mielec, Poland
- Height: 1.85 m (6 ft 1 in)
- Position: Defender

Team information
- Current team: Stal Mielec
- Number: 14

Youth career
- –2009: Stal Mielec

Senior career*
Years	Team	Apps	(Gls)
2009–2015	Stal Mielec	150	(13)
2010	→ Resovia (loan)	2	(0)
2015–2016	Siarka Tarnobrzeg	18	(2)
2016–2017	Radomiak Radom	45	(3)
2017–2018	Wigry Suwałki	14	(1)
2018–2020	Raków Częstochowa	33	(4)
2020–2022	Stal Mielec	22	(0)
2022	Puszcza Niepołomice	15	(2)
2022–2023	Warta Poznań	19	(0)
2023–2025	Stal Rzeszów	57	(4)
2025–2026	Miedź Legnica	13	(2)
2026	Miedź Legnica II	14	(2)
2026–	Stal Mielec	0	(0)
- * Club domestic league appearances and goals as of 17:03, 28 May 2026 (UTC)

Kamil Kościelny (born 4 August 1991) is a Polish professional footballer who plays as a defender for I liga club Stal Mielec.

== Club career ==
On 4 August 2020, Kościelny returned to his first club Stal Mielec that was just promoted to the top-tier Ekstraklasa.

== Honours ==
Stal Mielec

- III liga Lublin–Subcarpathia: 2012–13

Raków Częstochowa

- I liga: 2018–19
