= Michał Gliwa =

Polish footballer (born 1988)

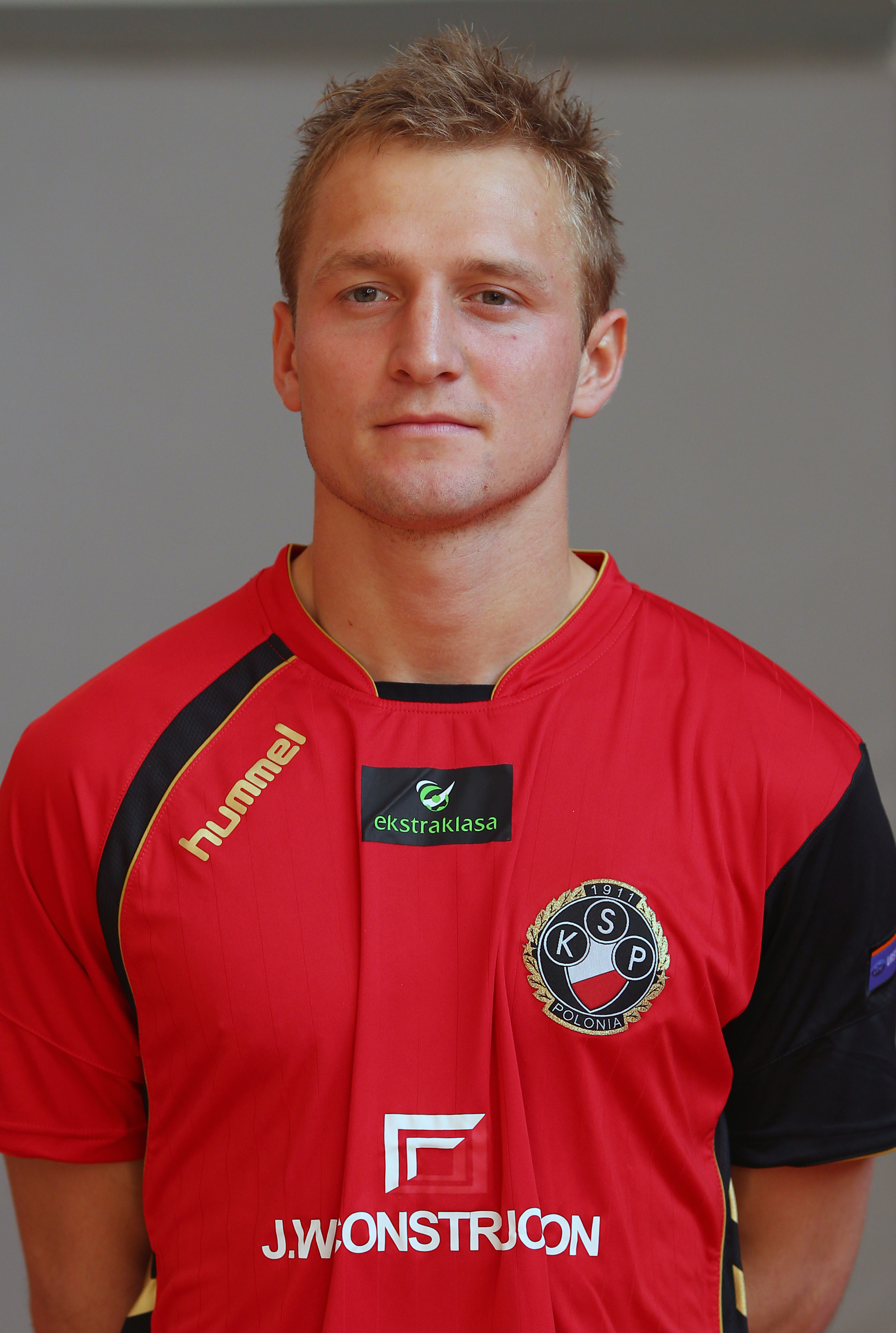
- Gliwa with Polonia Warsaw in 2011

Personal information
- Date of birth: 8 April 1988 (age 38)
- Place of birth: Rzeszów, Poland
- Height: 1.88 m (6 ft 2 in)
- Position: Goalkeeper

Team information
- Current team: Sokół Kolbuszowa Dolna
- Number: 33

Youth career
- 2003–2004: Orły Rzeszów
- 2004–2006: Cracovia
- 2007: Dyskobolia Grodzisk

Senior career*
Years	Team	Apps	(Gls)
2007–2008	Dyskobolia Grodzisk	0	(0)
2008–2012	Polonia Warsaw	26	(0)
2012–2014	Zagłębie Lubin	45	(0)
2014–2015	Pandurii Târgu Jiu	24	(0)
2016–2018	Sandecja Nowy Sącz	43	(0)
2018–2020	Raków Częstochowa	44	(0)
2020–2022	Stal Mielec	8	(0)
2022–2023	Zagłębie Sosnowiec	36	(0)
2023–2025	Resovia	18	(0)
2026–	Sokół Kolbuszowa Dolna	14	(0)

International career
2009–2010	Poland U21	3	(0)
2010	Poland U23	2	(0)
2011	Poland	1	(0)
- * Club domestic league appearances and goals as of 17:43, 3 June 2026 (UTC)

Michał Gliwa (born 8 April 1988) is a Polish professional footballer who plays as a goalkeeper for III liga club Sokół Kolbuszowa Dolna.

On 16 December 2011, Gliwa debuted for the Poland senior squad in a friendly match against Bosnia and Herzegovina. On 3 August 2020, he joined Stal Mielec.

== Career statistics ==
=== International ===
Appearances and goals by national team and year
National team	Year	Apps	Goals
Poland
Poland	2011	1	0
Total		1	0

== Honours ==
Dyskobolia Grodzisk Wielkopolski

- Ekstraklasa Cup: 2007–08

Sandecja Nowy Sącz

- I liga: 2016–17

Raków Częstochowa

- I liga: 2018–19
