= Uroš Korun =

Slovenian footballer (born 1987)

Personal information
- Date of birth: 25 May 1987 (age 39)
- Place of birth: Celje, SFR Yugoslavia
- Height: 1.88 m (6 ft 2 in)
- Position: Defender

Team information
- Current team: Aluminij

Youth career
- Vransko
- –2006: Celje

Senior career*
Years	Team	Apps	(Gls)
2005–2010	Celje	75	(9)
2006–2007	→ Zagorje (loan)	17	(2)
2007–2008	→ Rudar Velenje (loan)	13	(2)
2010–2011	Rudar Velenje	29	(4)
2011–2015	Domžale	102	(5)
2015–2020	Piast Gliwice	132	(4)
2020–2022	Olimpija Ljubljana	39	(0)
2022–2025	Radomlje	81	(4)
2025–2026	Tabor Sežana	16	(4)
2026–	Aluminij	0	(0)

International career
2004	Slovenia U17	2	(0)
2007	Slovenia U20	1	(0)
2006–2008	Slovenia U21	9	(0)
2019	Slovenia B	1	(0)
- * Club domestic league appearances and goals as of 29 January 2026

Uroš Korun (born 25 May 1987) is a Slovenian professional footballer who plays as a defender for Aluminij.

== Honours ==
Piast Gliwice

- Ekstraklasa: 2018–19

Olimpija Ljubljana

- Slovenian Cup: 2020–21
