= Tomasz Mokwa =

Polish footballer

Personal information
- Full name: Tomasz Mokwa
- Date of birth: 10 February 1993 (age 33)
- Place of birth: Słupsk, Poland
- Height: 1.82 m (6 ft 0 in)
- Position: Right-back

Youth career
- Canal+ Słupsk
- Jantar Ustka
- 2009–2011: Arka Gdynia

Senior career*
Years	Team	Apps	(Gls)
2011–2012	Arka Gdynia II	13	(3)
2012–2013	Calisia Kalisz	33	(2)
2013–2014	Flota Świnoujście	28	(0)
2014–2017	Piast Gliwice	52	(2)
2017–2019	GKS Katowice	6	(0)
2019–2026	Piast Gliwice	60	(1)
- * Club domestic league appearances and goals as of 21:51, 29 May 2026 (UTC)

Tomasz Mokwa (born 10 February 1993) is a Polish professional footballer who plays as a right-back.

== Honours ==
Arka Gdynia II

- IV liga Pomerania: 2011–12

Piast Gliwice

- Ekstraklasa: 2018–19
