= Jakub Szmatuła =

Polish footballer

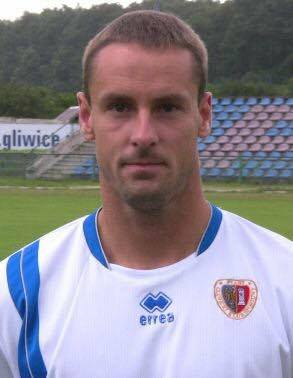

Personal information
- Full name: Jakub Szmatuła
- Date of birth: 22 March 1981 (age 45)
- Place of birth: Poznań, Poland
- Height: 1.87 m (6 ft 2 in)
- Position: Goalkeeper

Team information
- Current team: Nowy Sikornik Gliwice

Youth career
- Sokół Rakoniewice
- MSP Szamotuły
- Sparta Oborniki

Senior career*
Years	Team	Apps	(Gls)
1999–2001	Czarni Żagań		
2001	Aluminium Konin		
2002	Wigry Suwałki		
2002–2003	Lech Poznań	0	(0)
2003–2005	Zagłębie Lubin	9	(0)
2005–2006	→ Górnik Polkowice (loan)	32	(0)
2007	Górnik Polkowice	22	(0)
2007–2008	Warta Poznań	29	(0)
2008–2023	Piast Gliwice	185	(0)
2010	→ Górnik Zabrze (loan)	0	(0)
2013–2014	Piast Gliwice II	17	(0)
2026–	Nowy Sikornik Gliwice	0	(0)
- * Club domestic league appearances and goals as of 11:34, 5 September 2026 (UTC)

Jakub Szmatuła (born 22 March 1981) is a Polish professional footballer who plays as a goalkeeper for KP Nowy Sikornik Gliwice. He most recently served as the goalkeeping coach of Ekstraklasa club Piast Gliwice.

== Honours ==
Piast Gliwice

- Ekstraklasa: 2018–19
- I liga: 2011–12

Individual

- Ekstraklasa Goalkeeper of the Season: 2015–16
