= Remigiusz Borkała =

Polish footballer

Personal information
- Date of birth: 28 February 1999 (age 27)
- Place of birth: Cieszyn, Poland
- Height: 1.76 m (5 ft 9 in)
- Position: Midfielder

Team information
- Current team: Karkonosze Jelenia Góra
- Number: 7

Youth career
- 2010–2011: Strażak Dębowiec
- 2011–2014: Beskid 09 Skoczów
- 2014–2016: MFK Karviná
- 2016–2019: Piast Gliwice

Senior career*
Years	Team	Apps	(Gls)
2019–2021	Piast Gliwice	1	(0)
2021–2023	GKS Jastrzębie	34	(0)
2023–2024	Pelikan Łowicz	46	(1)
2024–2025	LKS Jawiszowice	9	(1)
2025	Pelikan Łowicz	15	(0)
2025–	Karkonosze Jelenia Góra	31	(3)
- * Club domestic league appearances and goals as of 17:09, 4 June 2026 (UTC)

Remigiusz Borkała (born 28 February 1999) is a Polish professional footballer who plays as a midfielder for III liga club Karkonosze Jelenia Góra.
