= Mateusz Mak =

Polish footballer

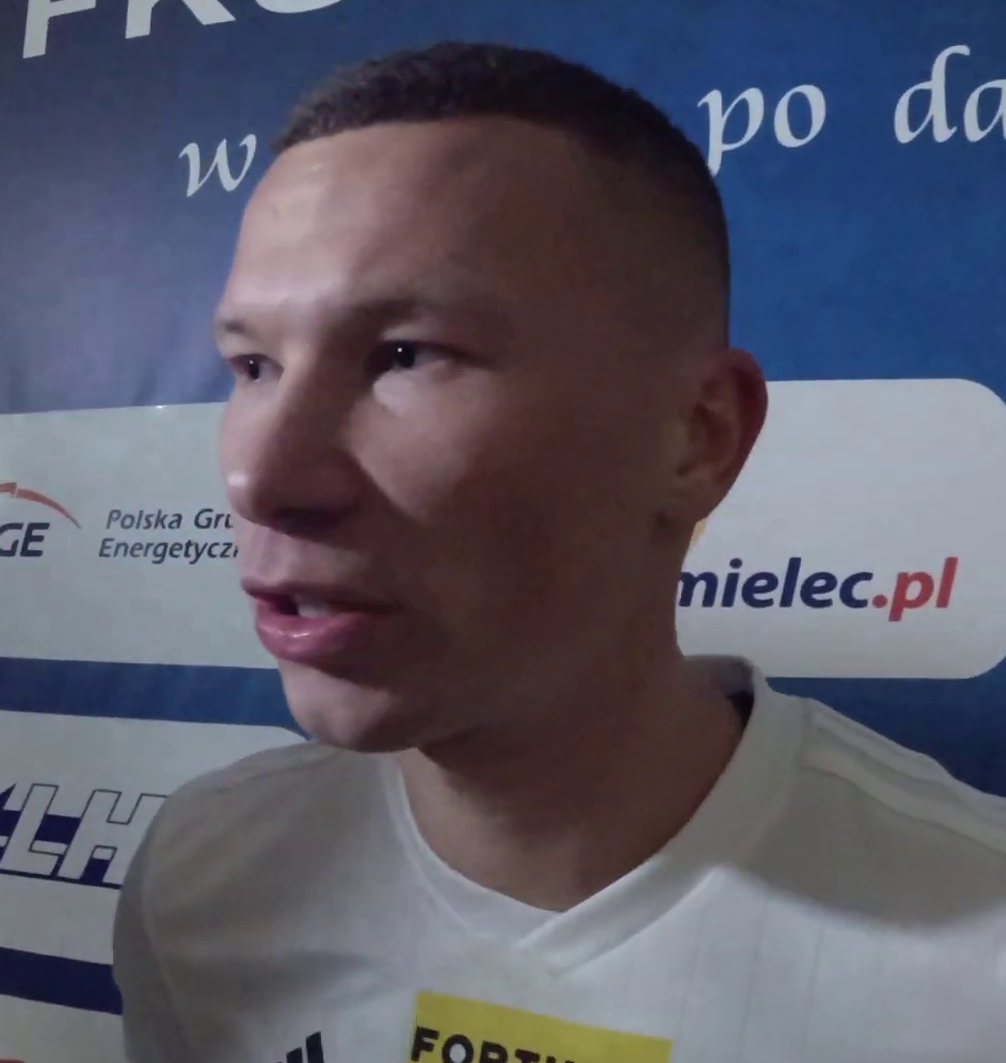
- Mak in 2019

Personal information
- Date of birth: 14 November 1991 (age 34)
- Place of birth: Sucha Beskidzka, Poland
- Height: 1.73 m (5 ft 8 in)
- Position: Attacking midfielder

Youth career
- Babia Góra Sucha Beskidzka
- Wisła Kraków
- 2009: Stadion Śląski Chorzów

Senior career*
| Years | Team | Apps | (Gls) |
| 2010–2011 | Ruch Radzionków | 36 | (9) |
| 2012–2015 | GKS Bełchatów | 63 | (9) |
| 2015–2019 | Piast Gliwice | 61 | (10) |
| 2019–2023 | Stal Mielec | 100 | (23) |
| 2023–2025 | GKS Katowice | 41 | (8) |
| 2025–2026 | Znicz Pruszków | 16 | (0) |
| Total | | 317 | (59) |

International career
| 2012 | Poland U21 | 1 | (0) |
- * Club domestic league appearances and goals

Mateusz Mak (born 14 November 1991) is a Polish former professional footballer who played as an attacking midfielder.

== Personal life ==
His twin brother, Michał Mak, also played football professionally. They played together for Ruch Radzionków and GKS Bełchatów.

== Career statistics ==
Appearances and goals by club, season and competition
| Club | Season | League | | | Polish Cup | | Europe | | Total | |
| Club | Season | Division | Apps | Goals | Apps | Goals | Apps | Goals | Apps | Goals |
|---|---|---|---|---|---|---|---|---|---|---|
| Ruch Radzionków | 2009–10 | II liga West | 2 | 1 | 0 | 0 | — | | 2 | 1 |
| Ruch Radzionków | 2010–11 | I liga | 14 | 0 | 1 | 0 | — | | 15 | 0 |
| Ruch Radzionków | 2011–12 | I liga | 20 | 8 | 1 | 0 | — | | 21 | 8 |
| Ruch Radzionków | Total | | 36 | 9 | 2 | 0 | — | | 38 | 9 |
| GKS Bełchatów | 2011–12 | Ekstraklasa | 11 | 1 | — | | — | | 11 | 1 |
| GKS Bełchatów | 2012–13 | Ekstraklasa | 16 | 2 | 1 | 0 | — | | 17 | 2 |
| GKS Bełchatów | 2013–14 | I liga | 33 | 5 | 0 | 0 | — | | 33 | 5 |
| GKS Bełchatów | 2014–15 | Ekstraklasa | 3 | 1 | 0 | 0 | — | | 3 | 1 |
| GKS Bełchatów | Total | | 63 | 9 | 1 | 0 | — | | 64 | 9 |
| Piast Gliwice | 2015–16 | Ekstraklasa | 26 | 7 | 0 | 0 | — | | 26 | 7 |
| Piast Gliwice | 2016–17 | Ekstraklasa | 1 | 0 | 0 | 0 | 2 (Note: Appearances in UEFA Europa League) | 0 | 3 | 0 |
| Piast Gliwice | 2017–18 | Ekstraklasa | 14 | 2 | 1 | 0 | — | | 15 | 2 |
| Piast Gliwice | 2018–19 | Ekstraklasa | 20 | 1 | 1 | 0 | — | | 21 | 1 |
| Piast Gliwice | Total | | 61 | 10 | 2 | 0 | 2 | 0 | 65 | 10 |
| Stal Mielec | 2019–20 | I liga | 30 | 10 | 4 | 3 | — | | 34 | 13 |
| Stal Mielec | 2020–21 | Ekstraklasa | 25 | 4 | 1 | 0 | — | | 26 | 4 |
| Stal Mielec | 2021–22 | Ekstraklasa | 20 | 7 | 0 | 0 | — | | 20 | 7 |
| Stal Mielec | 2022–23 | Ekstraklasa | 25 | 2 | 1 | 0 | — | | 26 | 2 |
| Stal Mielec | Total | | 100 | 23 | 6 | 3 | — | | 106 | 26 |
| GKS Katowice | 2023–24 | I liga | 26 | 6 | 1 | 0 | — | | 27 | 6 |
| GKS Katowice | 2024–25 | Ekstraklasa | 15 | 2 | 1 | 0 | — | | 16 | 2 |
| GKS Katowice | Total | | 41 | 8 | 2 | 0 | — | | 43 | 8 |
| Znicz Pruszków | 2025–26 | I liga | 16 | 0 | 2 | 0 | — | | 18 | 0 |
| Career total | | | 317 | 59 | 15 | 3 | 2 | 0 | 334 | 62 |

== Honours ==
Ruch Radzionków

- II liga West: 2009–10

GKS Bełchatów

- I liga: 2013–14

Piast Gliwice

- Ekstraklasa: 2018–19

Stal Mielec

- I liga: 2019–20

GKS Katowice II

- Regional league Silesia IV: 2024–25
