= Sandecja Nowy Sącz =

Polish football club

- Full name: Miejski Klub Sportowy Sandecja Nowy Sącz
- Nicknames: Pride of Nowy Sącz, Sączersi, Bianconeri
- Founded: 1910; 116 years ago
- Ground: Sandecja Stadium
- Capacity: 8,111
- Owner(s): Arkadiusz Aleksander; Grzegorz Stawiarski
- Chairman: Grzegorz Stawiarski
- Manager: Ireneusz Mamrot
- League: II liga
- 2025–26: II liga, 6th of 18
- Website: https://sandecja.pl/
Home colours	Away colours

Sandecja Nowy Sącz is a Polish football club from Nowy Sącz, Lesser Poland Voivodeship, that was formed in 1910. In the 2026–27 season, they compete in the II liga, the third tier of Polish football.

In the 2016–17 season, Sandecja won I liga, which promoted the club to the Polish Ekstraklasa, Poland's highest professional football league, for the first time in the club's history.

== Stadium ==
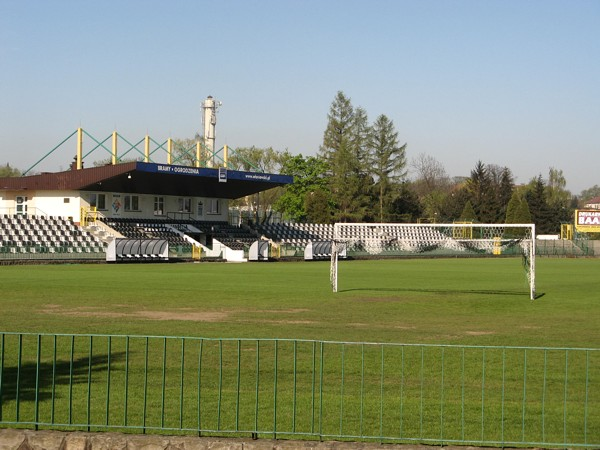
Stadion im. Ojca Władysława Augustynka

Up to 1979, Sandecja's stadium was named the PRL 25th Anniversary Stadium at the initiative of the then Communist leaders of the city. In 1998, nine years after the fall of communism in Poland, it was then renamed in honor of Father Władysław Augustynek, a popular local Catholic priest, who was a passionate fan of the club.

The stadium was closed in 2021; the following year, work began on constructing a new venue, called the Sandecja Stadium, on the same site as its predecessor.

== History ==
Sandecja was founded in 1910, upon the initiative of Adam Bieda, who was the chairman of the Nowy Sącz branch of the Sokol Sports Association. The name of the club comes after Latin name of the city of Nowy Sącz (Nova Civitas Sandecz), and from the very beginning, Sandecja was supported by the local Zakłady Naprawcze Taboru Kolejowego. For most of its history, Sandecja was closely associated with Polish Railroads, and its official name was Rail Sports Club Sandecja (since 1999: Municipal Sports Club Sandecja).

Throughout the years, Sandecja had several departments, including men's and women's volleyball (1950 - 2009), handball (1950 – 1955), basketball (1950 – 1961), track and field (1945 – 1970), skiing (1945 – 1956), ice-hockey (1951 – 1964), boxing (1948 – 1960), table tennis (1945 – 1955).

== Timeline ==
Club badge used from 2004 until 2018.

- 1910 – Adam Bieda of the local Sokol Movement found the club,
- 1912 – the statutes of Sandecja are approved: "The purpose of the Club is to promote physical development of the youth"
- 1914–1918 – World War I. Most players serve in the Austro-Hungarian Army,
- August 1921 – Sandecja returns,
- 1924 – the club has 230 members in several departments,
- 1928–1932 – the club suspends its activities, due to the loss of its own field,
- 1933 – new field and new gym are opened, and with new manager, Franciszek Krupski of Polish Railways, Sandecja returns as Rail Club of Military Training Sandecja,
- 1934–1939 – the football team plays in the second and third levels of Polish football system (Class A, against KS Moscice, KSZO Ostrowiec Świętokrzyski, WKS Kielce, Azotania Jaworzno, Riflemen Association Chełmek, and a number of teams from Kraków,
- 1939–1945 – during World War II, the athletes of Sandecja are involved in conspirational activities of the Home Army (AK) and other organizations. Football player Julian Zubek commanded the largest AK unit in the area. Klemens Gucwa, Leopold Kwiatkowski, Jan Freisler and Roman Stramka serve as couriers,
- February 1945 – Sandecja returns. First postwar game took place on 15 April 1945: KS OMTUR Sandecja beats RKS Świt 2–1,
- 30 May 1946 – Sandecja loses 0–17 to Cracovia,
- 1966 – Sandecja wins promotion to the third league,
- 1967 – women's volleyball team becomes the regional champion,
- 1 May 1970 – at the newly opened stadium, located at Kilińsk Street, an international U-19 friendly between Poland and Hungary is played. Poland loses 2–3, and among Polish players were Kazimierz Kmiecik, Mirosław Bulzacki, Zbigniew Plaszewski, Jerzy Kraska. The game was attended by 10 000 people,
- July 1978 – Sandecja's U-19 team becomes the fourth team in Poland,
- June 1986 – Sandecja wins promotion to the second division. In its first home game (August 1986), Sandecja beats Broń Radom 3–1, but after one year, the team is relegated back to the third division (only 10 points in 30 games, with a goal difference of 19–52),
- June 1992 – Sandecja again wins promotion to the second tier, to be again relegated after one year (19 points in 34 games, a goal difference of 27–54).
- 1998 – Sandecja's U-17 team finishes fourth in the Polish Championship,
- 27 June 1999 – Sandecja is renamed into Municipal Sports Club (MKS),
- June 2009 – Sandecja, managed by Jarosław Araszkiewicz, once again is promoted to the second division.
- May 2017 – Sandecja, managed by Radosław Mroczkowski, is promoted to the Ekstraklasa (top tier of Polish professional league) for the first time in its history.

== Honours ==
- I liga:
  - Champions: 2016–17

== Players ==
=== Current squad ===
As of 9 September 2026

Note: Flags indicate national team as defined under FIFA eligibility rules; some limited exceptions apply. Players may hold more than one non-FIFA nationality.

No.	Pos.	Nation	Player
1	GK	POL	Karol Szymkowiak
3	DF	POL	Wiktor Pleśnierowicz
6	MF	POL	Maciej Żurawski
7	FW	CRO	Marko Kolar
8	MF	POL	Łukasz Gerstenstein
9	MF	CZE	Dominik Holaň
10	FW	POL	Piotr Janczukowicz
11	MF	POL	Szymon Kawała (on loan from Wisła Kraków)
12	MF	SVK	Tobiáš Diviš (on loan from Železiarne Podbrezová)
16	DF	POL	Karol Smajdor
17	FW	POL	Marcel Płocica (on loan from Górnik Zabrze)
18	DF	POL	Bartosz Szeliga
19	MF	POL	Tomasz Kołbon

No.	Pos.	Nation	Player
20	MF	POL	Eryk Kosiński
22	MF	ESP	Goku Román
23	DF	POL	Adrian Danek
24	DF	POL	Kamil Słaby (captain)
25	FW	POL	Filip Piszczek
26	DF	POL	Piotr Kowalik (on loan from Stal Mielec)
29	MF	SVK	Adam Brenkus
30	GK	POL	Bartosz Głogowski (on loan from Śląsk Wrocław)
33	MF	POL	Bartłomiej Kasprzak
47	DF	POL	Wojciech Błyszko
74	MF	POL	Przemysław Skałecki
76	MF	POL	Patryk Kieliś
98	MF	POL	Kamil Ogorzały

=== Out on loan ===
Note: Flags indicate national team as defined under FIFA eligibility rules; some limited exceptions apply. Players may hold more than one non-FIFA nationality.

No.	Pos.	Nation	Player
77	MF	POL	Leon Ziętek (at Hetman Zamość until 30 June 2027)
92	FW	POL	Arkadiusz Orzeł (at Elana Toruń until 30 June 2027)

No.	Pos.	Nation	Player
—	MF	POL	Patryk Peciak (at Siarka Tarnobrzeg until 30 June 2027)
—	GK	POL	Konrad Tokarz (at Polonia Nysa until 30 June 2027)

=== Notable players ===
Had international caps for their respective countries. Players marked in bold have had caps while playing for Sandecja.

- (Armenia) David Manoyan (2018)
- (Canada) **Charlie Trafford** (2017)
- (Estonia) Robert Kirss (2023)
- (Estonia) Karl-Romet Nõmm (2023)
- (Georgia (country)) Giorgi Merebashvili (2022)
- (Poland) Tomasz Brzyski (2017–2018)
- (Poland) Mateusz Cetnarski (2017–2018)
- (Poland) Michał Gliwa (2016–2018)
- (Poland) Dawid Janczyk (2004–2005, 2016)
- (Poland) Maciej Małkowski (2015–2022)
- (Slovakia) Martin Polaček (2024–2026)
- (Slovakia) Rudolf Urban (2010, 2014–2015)
- (Ukraine) Pavlo Ksyonz (2018)

In addition, Marek and Piotr Świerczewski, who played for Sandecja in their youth career but not their senior career, had international caps for Poland (the latter won 70 of them).
