= Martin Konczkowski =

Polish footballer

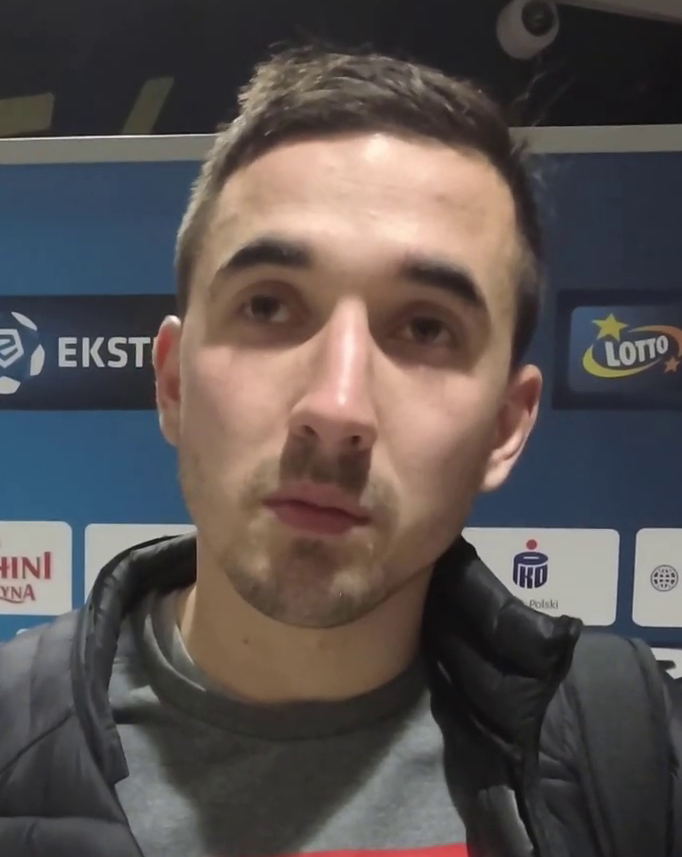
- Konczkowski in 2019

Personal information
- Full name: Martin Konczkowski
- Date of birth: 14 September 1993 (age 33)
- Place of birth: Ruda Śląska, Poland
- Height: 1.81 m (5 ft 11 1/2 in)
- Position: Right-back

Team information
- Current team: Ruch Chorzów
- Number: 15

Youth career
- –2009: Wawel Wirek
- 2011–2012: Ruch Chorzów

Senior career*
Years	Team	Apps	(Gls)
2009–2011	Wawel Wirek		
2013–2017	Ruch Chorzów	126	(1)
2013–2014	Ruch Chorzów II	9	(0)
2017–2022	Piast Gliwice	148	(3)
2022–2024	Śląsk Wrocław	45	(1)
2024–	Ruch Chorzów	60	(0)

International career
2013	Poland U20	3	(0)
2013	Poland U21	1	(0)
- * Club domestic league appearances and goals as of 14:47, 29 May 2026 (UTC)

Martin Konczkowski (born 14 September 1993) is a Polish professional footballer who plays as a right-back for I liga club Ruch Chorzów.

== Career statistics ==
As of match played 27 April 2026

Appearances and goals by club, season and competition
Club	Season	League			Polish Cup		Europe		Other		Total	
Club	Season	Division	Apps	Goals	Apps	Goals	Apps	Goals	Apps	Goals	Apps	Goals
Ruch Chorzów	2012–13	Ekstraklasa	10	0	3	0	—		—		13	0
Ruch Chorzów	2013–14	Ekstraklasa	15	0	1	0	—		—		16	0
Ruch Chorzów	2014–15	Ekstraklasa	30	1	0	0	2 (Note: Appearances in UEFA Europa League)	0	—		32	1
Ruch Chorzów	2015–16	Ekstraklasa	35	0	1	0	—		—		36	0
Ruch Chorzów	2016–17	Ekstraklasa	36	0	2	0	—		—		38	0
Ruch Chorzów	Total		126	1	7	0	2	0	—		135	1
Ruch Chorzów II	2013–14	III liga, gr. F	4	0	—		—		—		4	0
Ruch Chorzów II	2014–15	III liga, gr. F	5	0	—		—		—		5	0
Ruch Chorzów II	Total		9	0	—		—		—		9	0
Piast Gliwice	2017–18	Ekstraklasa	37	1	1	0	—		—		38	1
Piast Gliwice	2018–19	Ekstraklasa	32	0	2	0	—		—		34	0
Piast Gliwice	2019–20	Ekstraklasa	23	0	2	1	4 (Note: Two appearances in UEFA Champions League, two appearances in UEFA Europa League)	0	1 (Note: Appearance in Polish Super Cup)	0	30	1
Piast Gliwice	2020–21	Ekstraklasa	25	0	3	0	3	1	—		31	1
Piast Gliwice	2021–22	Ekstraklasa	31	2	0	0	—		—		31	2
Piast Gliwice	Total		148	3	8	1	7	1	1	0	164	5
Śląsk Wrocław	2022–23	Ekstraklasa	23	0	3	0	—		—		26	0
Śląsk Wrocław	2023–24	Ekstraklasa	22	1	1	0	—		—		23	1
Śląsk Wrocław	Total		45	1	4	0	—		—		49	1
Ruch Chorzów	2024–25	I liga	30	0	3	0	—		—		33	0
Ruch Chorzów	2025–26	I liga	30	0	1	0	—		—		31	0
Ruch Chorzów	Total		60	0	4	0	—		—		64	1
Career total			388	5	23	1	9	1	1	0	421	7

== Honours ==
Piast Gliwice

- Ekstraklasa: 2018–19
