= Patryk Sokołowski =

Polish footballer (born 1994)

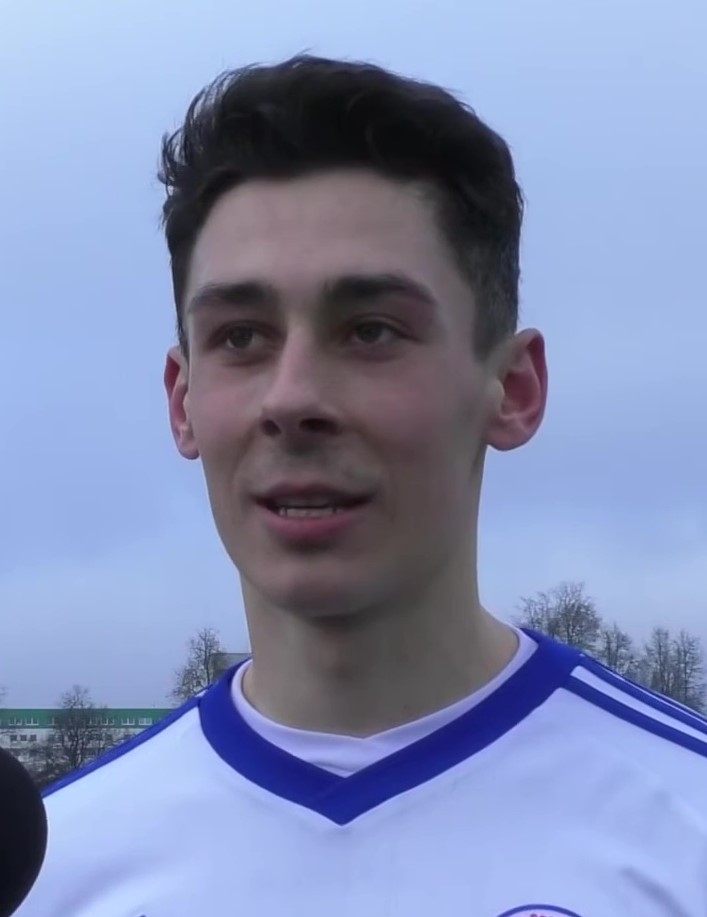
- Sokołowski in 2018

Personal information
- Date of birth: 25 September 1994 (age 32)
- Place of birth: Warsaw, Poland
- Height: 1.82 m (6 ft 0 in)
- Position: Midfielder

Team information
- Current team: Śląsk Wrocław
- Number: 81

Youth career
- 2000–2013: Legia Warsaw

Senior career*
Years	Team	Apps	(Gls)
2013–2014	Legia Warsaw II	5	(0)
2014	→ Olimpia Elbląg (loan)	11	(1)
2014–2015	Znicz Pruszków	13	(0)
2015–2017	Olimpia Elbląg	80	(5)
2017–2018	Wigry Suwałki	32	(1)
2018–2022	Piast Gliwice	95	(8)
2022–2023	Legia Warsaw	33	(2)
2023	Legia Warsaw II	7	(3)
2024–2025	Cracovia	45	(1)
2025–	Śląsk Wrocław	25	(1)
- * Club domestic league appearances and goals as of 13:04, 26 May 2026 (UTC)

Patryk Sokołowski (born 25 September 1994) is a Polish professional footballer who plays as a midfielder for Ekstraklasa club Śląsk Wrocław. A product of Legia Warsaw's academy, he has also played for Olimpia Elbląg, Znicz Pruszków, Wigry Suwałki, Cracovia and Piast Gliwice, and won the 2018–19 Ekstraklasa title with the latter.

== Honours ==
Olimpia Elbląg

- III liga Podlasie–Warmia-Masuria: 2015–16

Piast Gliwice

- Ekstraklasa: 2018–19

Legia Warsaw

- Polish Cup: 2022–23
