= Regional Polish Cup (Pomeranian Voivodeship) =

Regional knockout football competition in Polish football

Regional Polish Cup at the Pomeranian district level
- Organiser(s): Pomorski ZPN (Pomeranian Football Association)
- Founded: 2000
- Region: Poland
- Qualifier for: Polish Cup
- Current champions: Gryf Słupsk (3rd title)
- Most championships: Gryf Słupsk, Gryf Wejherowo, Kaszubia Kościerzyna (3 titles)
- Website: https://www.pomorski-zpn.pl/jesien2022/#51565

The Regional Polish Cup at the Pomeranian district level in football (Polish: Regionalny Puchar Polski na szczeblu okręgu pomorskiego is an elimination tournament for Polish football clubs in the Pomeranian Voivodeship. The winner of the competition, as with the other regional champions around Poland, earn the right to play in the next season's Polish Cup, playing in the first round of the competition.

The competition has been in its current format since 2000, as the regional borders in Poland were adjusted in 1999, creating the Pomeranian Voivodeship.

== Finals ==
Year	Winner	Score	Runner-up	Location
2000–01	Kaszubia Kościerzyna	5–1	Bałtyk Gdynia	
2001–02	Chojniczanka Chojnice	4–0	Olimpia Sztum	Gdańsk
2002–03	Gryf Wejherowo	5–1, 6–0 (11–1 agg.)	Olimpia Sztum	
2003–04	Olimpia Sztum	1–1 (3–2 pens.)	Lechia Gdańsk	Gdańsk
2004–05	Wierzyca Pelplin	4–0	Polonia Gdańsk	
2005–06	Czarni Pruszcz Gdański	3–2	Kaszubia Kościerzyna	Pruszcz Gdański
2006–07	KP Sopot	2–0, 2–3 (4–3 agg.)	Bytovia Bytów II	
2007–08	Bytovia Bytów II	3–0	Lechia Gdańsk II	Bytów
2008–09	Bytovia Bytów II	1–0, 0–0 (1–0 agg.)	Bałtyk Gdynia	
2009–10	Kaszubia Kościerzyna	2–1	Orkan Rumia	Rumia
2010–11	Gryf Wejherowo	1–0, 4–2 (5–2 agg.)	Gryf 2009 Tczew	
2011–12	Kaszubia Kościerzyna	3–2	Gryf Wejherowo	Starogard Gdański
2012–13	Cartusia Kartuzy	1–0	Kaszubia Kościerzyna	Malbork
2013–14	Brda Przechlewo	1–1 (5–4 pens.)	GOSRiT Luzino	Pszczółki
2014–15	Rodło Kwidzyn	2–1	GKS Przodkowo	Kwidzyn
2015–16	Pogoń Lębork	4–2	Brda Przechlewo	Rumia
2016–17	Gryf Słupsk	3–3 (5–3 pens.)	Grom Nowy Staw	Starogard Gdański
2017–18	KP Starogard Gdański	1–0	GKS Przodkowo	Malbork
2018–19	Gryf Słupsk	3–0	Grom Nowy Staw	Słupsk
2019–20	Jaguar Gdańsk	1–0	Kaszubia Kościerzyna	Brusy
2020–21	Powiśle Dzierzgoń	4–2	Bałtyk Gdynia	Pelplin
2021–22	Bałtyk Gdynia	4–3	Jaguar Gdańsk	Bytów
2022–23	Gryf Wejherowo	3–1	Chojniczanka Chojnice II	Stężyca
2023–24	Grom Nowy Staw	5–0	Sparta Sycewice	Malbork
2024–25	Gryf Słupsk	1–0	Arka Gdynia II	Bytów

== Team success ==
No.	Team	Wins	Runners-up
1.	Kaszubia Kościerzyna	3 (2000–01, 2009–10, 2011–12)	3 (2005–06, 2012–13, 2019–20)
2.	Gryf Wejherowo	3 (2002–03, 2010–11, 2022–23)	1 (2011–12)
3.	Gryf Słupsk	3 (2016–17, 2018–19, 2024–25)	–
4.	Bytovia Bytów II	2 (2007–08, 2008–09)	1 (2006–07)
5.	Bałtyk Gdynia	1 (2021–22)	3 (2000–01, 2008–09, 2020–21)
6.	Olimpia Sztum	1 (2003–04)	2 (2001–02, 2002–03)
6.	Grom Nowy Staw	1 (2023–24)	2 (2016–17, 2018–19)
8.	Brda Przechlewo	1 (2013–14)	1 (2015–16)
8.	Jaguar Gdańsk	1 (2019–20)	1 (2021–22)
10.	Chojniczanka Chojnice	1 (2001–02)	–
10.	Wierzyca Pelplin	1 (2004–05)	–
10.	Czarni Pruszcz Gdański	1 (2005–06)	–
10.	KP Sopot	1 (2006–07)	–
10.	Cartusia Kartuzy	1 (2012–13)	–
10.	Rodło Kwidzyn	1 (2014–15)	–
10.	Pogoń Lębork	1 (2015–16)	–
10.	KP Starogard Gdański	1 (2017–18)	–
10.	Powiśle Dzierzgoń	1 (2020–21)	–
19	GKS Przodkowo	–	2 (2014–15, 2017–18)
20.	Lechia Gdańsk	–	1 (2003–04)
20.	Polonia Gdańsk	–	1 (2004–05)
20.	Lechia Gdańsk II	–	1 (2007–08)
20.	Orkan Rumia	–	1 (2009–10)
20.	Gryf 2009 Tczew	–	1 (2010–11)
20.	GOSRiT Luzino	–	1 (2013–14)
20.	Chojniczanka Chojnice II	–	1 (2022–23)
20.	Sparta Sycewice	–	1 (2023–24)
20.	Arka Gdynia II	–	1 (2024–25)
