= Paweł Wojowski =

Polish footballer

Personal information
- Date of birth: 27 August 1994 (age 32)
- Place of birth: Kartuzy, Poland
- Height: 1.72 m (5 ft 8 in)
- Position: Left midfielder

Team information
- Current team: Czarni Pruszcz Gdański

Youth career
- Huragan Przodkowo
- –2013: Arka Gdynia

Senior career*
Years	Team	Apps	(Gls)
2013–2018	Arka Gdynia	73	(4)
2017	→ Stomil Olsztyn (loan)	13	(2)
2017	→ GKS Bełchatów (loan)	12	(0)
2018	→ Gryf Wejherowo (loan)	15	(1)
2018	ŁKS Łódź	4	(0)
2019–2023	Radunia Stężyca	87	(21)
2023–2024	Cartusia Kartuzy	29	(3)
2024–2025	Jaguar Gdańsk	31	(9)
2025–2026	KP Starogard Gdański	33	(10)
2026–	Czarni Pruszcz Gdański	0	(0)

International career
2011–2012	Poland U18	5	(0)
- * Club domestic league appearances and goals as of 16:15, 9 July 2026 (UTC)

Paweł Wojowski (born 27 August 1994) is a Polish professional footballer who plays as a left midfielder for IV liga Pomerania club Czarni Pruszcz Gdański.

== Career ==
=== Radunia Stężyca ===
Wojowski joined Radunia Stężyca on 4 February 2019.

== Honours ==
Arka Gdynia

- I liga: 2015–16
- Polish Cup: 2016–17

Radunia Stężyca

- III liga, group II: 2020–21
