= Damian Garbacik =

Polish footballer

Personal information
- Date of birth: 30 January 1996 (age 30)
- Place of birth: Kętrzyn, Poland
- Height: 1.86 m (6 ft 1 in)
- Position: Defender

Team information
- Current team: KP Starogard Gdański
- Number: 15

Youth career
- –2013: Granica Kętrzyn

Senior career*
Years	Team	Apps	(Gls)
2013–2016	Lechia Gdańsk	2	(0)
2013–2015	Lechia Gdańsk II	33	(2)
2015–2016	→ Chojniczanka Chojnice (loan)	13	(0)
2016–2017	GKS Katowice	19	(1)
2018	Bałtyk Gdynia	15	(0)
2019	Lysekloster IL	19	(3)
2020–2022	Bałtyk Gdynia	62	(10)
2022–2023	Cartusia Kartuzy	24	(4)
2023	KP Starogard Gdański	15	(4)
2024–2025	Wierzyca Pelplin	32	(7)
2025–	KP Starogard Gdański	43	(8)

International career
2013	Poland U17	2	(0)
2013–2014	Poland U18	7	(1)
2014	Poland U19	1	(0)
2017	Poland U20	1	(1)
- * Club domestic league appearances and goals as of 16:18, 9 July 2026 (UTC)

Damian Garbacik (born 30 January 1996) is a Polish professional footballer who plays as a defender for IV liga Pomerania club KP Starogard Gdański.

== Senior career ==
Garbacik started playing with the club in his town of birth, Granica Kętrzyn, in Kętrzyn. In 2013, he made the move to play with Lechia Gdańsk in the top flight of Polish football. However his time with Lechia was not successful, and he only made two appearances in the league. He joined Chojniczanka Chojnice on loan in 2015, before joining GKS Katowice at the end of the season when his contract with Lechia ran out. After a season and a half with Katowice, during which Garbacik also scored his first senior league goal, he was released before his contract was finished.

After a six-month spell without finding a new club, Garbacik signed with Bałtyk Gdynia during the 2018 pre-season. In January 2019, after moving down the leagues in Poland, Garbacik moved to the Norwegian lower leagues with Lysekloster IL, stating that he wanted to try a new challenge. While in Norway, Garbacik was often in the starting eleven, and found himself to be scoring more than he had at any previous club. Despite the level of quality being lower than at his previous clubs, it proved to be a personally successful period for Garbacik scoring three league goals during his time at the club, including one in the Norwegian Cup. Garbacik spent the 2019 season with Lysekloster IL before returning to his previous club Bałtyk Gdynia in February 2020.

== Honours ==
Bałtyk Gdynia

- Polish Cup (Pomerania regionals): 2021–22

Wierzyca Pelplin

- Regional league Gdańsk II: 2023–24
