= Wojciech Zyska =

Polish footballer

Personal information
- Date of birth: 8 January 1994 (age 32)
- Place of birth: Sztum, Poland
- Height: 1.83 m (6 ft 0 in)
- Position: Midfielder

Team information
- Current team: Powiśle Dzierzgoń
- Number: 5

Youth career
- 2000–2010: Olimpia Sztum

Senior career*
| Years | Team | Apps | (Gls) |
| 2010–2012 | Olimpia Sztum | 56 | (15) |
| 2012 | Gryf Tczew | 8 | (0) |
| 2012–2014 | Lechia Gdańsk | 16 | (0) |
| 2014–2015 | Wisła Płock | 8 | (0) |
| 2015–2017 | Bałtyk Gdynia | 57 | (19) |
| 2017 | Gwardia Koszalin | 12 | (1) |
| 2018–2019 | KP Starogard Gdański | 38 | (10) |
| 2019–2020 | Sokół Ostróda | 7 | (0) |
| 2020–2021 | Olimpia Elbląg | 32 | (4) |
| 2021–2024 | Gedania Gdańsk | 76 | (26) |
| 2024– | Powiśle Dzierzgoń | 51 | (18) |

International career
| 2012 | Poland U18 | 2 | (0) |
- * Club domestic league appearances and goals as of 12:58, 26 June 2026 (UTC)

Wojciech Zyska (born 8 January 1994) is a Polish professional footballer who plays as a midfielder for IV liga Pomerania club Powiśle Dzierzgoń.

== Honours ==
KP Starogard Gdański

- Polish Cup (Pomerania regionals): 2017–18

Sokół Ostróda

- III liga, group I: 2019–20

Gedania Gdańsk

- IV liga Pomerania: 2021–22

Powiśle Dzierzgoń

- Regional league Gdańsk II: 2024–25
