= Piotr Kołc =

Polish footballer (born 1987)

Personal information
- Date of birth: 15 July 1987 (age 39)
- Place of birth: Gdańsk, Poland
- Height: 1.84 m (6 ft 0 in)
- Position: Midfielder

Youth career
- –2006: Polonia Gdańsk

Senior career*
Years	Team	Apps	(Gls)
2006	Polonia Gdańsk		
2006–2008	Cartusia Kartuzy	22	(0)
2008–2009	Pogoń Szczecin	16	(0)
2010	Jeziorak Ilawa	12	(2)
2011–2019	Gryf Wejherowo	175	(14)
2019–2020	Sokół Ostróda	16	(1)

Managerial career
- 2019–2020: Sokół Ostróda (player-manager)
- 2021–2024: Zawisza Bydgoszcz
- 2024: Lechia Tomaszów Mazowiecki
- 2024–2025: Resovia
- 2026: KP Starogard Gdański
- * Club domestic league appearances and goals

Piotr Kołc (born 15 July 1987) is a Polish professional football manager and former player who played as a midfielder. He was most recently the manager of IV liga Pomerania club KP Starogard Gdański.

== Playing career ==
He began his career at Polonia Gdańsk on 2006, he then moved on a free transfer to Cartusia Kartuzy on 1 July 2006.

In 2008 he moved to Pogoń Szczecin on another free transfer, but after suffering a serious injury, Kołc was unable to find a starting place in the team and was released on 10 November 2009.

On 1 February 2010 he moved to Jeziorak Ilawa, but he left the club in July after his contract expired.

On 1 January 2011, Kołc joined Gryf Wejherowo. He stayed at Gryf for eight years before joining Sokół Ostróda in 2019 on a free transfer.

He retired in 2020 after playing one season for Sokół.

== Coaching career ==
After signing for Sokół, in 2019 he held the position of player-manager.

On 3 August 2020, he was appointed Krzysztof Brede's assistant manager at Podbeskidzie Bielsko-Biala. He left Podbeskidzie on 23 December a week after Brede was sacked.

On 19 January 2021, he became the manager of Zawisza Bydgoszcz. In his first season in charge, Kołc got Zawisza promoted to the III liga, winning the 2020–21 IV liga IV liga Kuyavia-Pomerania group. On 15 June 2022, under Kołc's management, Zawisza won the Kuyavia-Pomerania Polish regional cup, and repeated the same feat in the following campaign. On 2 May 2024, Zawisza announced Kołc would leave the club at the end of June, upon the expiration of his contract.

On 27 June 2024, Kołc joined the management staff of II liga club Olimpia Grudziądz as an assistant under newly appointed manager Grzegorz Niciński.

On 18 September 2024, Kołc left Olimpia to take charge of III liga club Lechia Tomaszów Mazowiecki. Exactly three months later, after leading Lechia in 13 games across all competitions, Kołc was announced as the new manager of third-tier side Resovia. Resovia finished the 2024–25 season in 10th place. On 24 November 2025, Kołc was relieved of his duties.

On 9 February 2026, Kołc was appointed manager of KP Starogard Gdański, competing in the IV liga Pomerania. 49 days later, on 29 March, he resigned following a 2–2 draw with Chojniczanka Chojnice's reserve team. He left the club with a record of two wins, one draw and one loss.

== Managerial statistics ==
As of match played 29 March 2026

Managerial record by team and tenure
Team	From	To	Record							
Team	From	To	G	W	D	L	GF	GA	GD	Win %
Sokół Ostróda	1 July 2019	3 June 2020	22	15	4	3	65	21	+44	68.18
Zawisza Bydgoszcz	19 January 2021	30 June 2024	134	73	25	36	290	162	+128	54.48
Lechia Tomaszów Mazowiecki	18 September 2024	18 December 2024	13	7	1	5	32	17	+15	53.85
Resovia	18 December 2024	24 November 2025	34	10	13	11	42	42	+0	29.41
KP Starogard Gdański	9 February 2026	29 March 2026	4	2	1	1	8	4	+4	50.00
Total			207	107	44	56	437	246	+191	51.69

== Honours ==
=== Player ===
Gryf Wejherowo

- III liga Pomerania-West Pomerania: 2011–12, 2014–15
- Polish Cup (Pomerania regionals): 2010–11

=== Manager ===
Sokół Ostróda

- III liga, group I: 2019–20
- Polish Cup (Warmia-Masuria regionals): 2019–20

Zawisza Bydgoszcz

- IV liga Kuyavia-Pomerania: 2020–21
- Polish Cup (Kuyavia-Pomerania regionals): 2021–22, 2022–23
