= Oskar Paprzycki =

Polish footballer (born 1998)

Personal information
- Full name: Oskar Paprzycki
- Date of birth: 31 July 1998 (age 28)
- Place of birth: Gdańsk, Poland
- Height: 1.90 m (6 ft 3 in)
- Position: Midfielder

Team information
- Current team: Czarni Pruszcz Gdański

Youth career
- Beniaminek 03 Starogard Gdański
- –2011: KP Starogard Gdański
- 2012–2014: AP Lechia Gdańsk
- 2014–2015: Lechia Gdańsk

Senior career*
Years	Team	Apps	(Gls)
2015–2016	Lechia Gdańsk II	20	(2)
2016–2017	Kotwica Kołobrzeg	24	(0)
2017–2020	Chojniczanka	69	(3)
2020–2022	GKS Tychy	49	(3)
2022–2023	Odra Opole	14	(0)
2023–2024	Chojniczanka Chojnice	25	(1)
2024–2025	GKS Jastrzębie	26	(0)
2025–2026	KP Starogard Gdański	28	(6)
2026–	Czarni Pruszcz Gdański	0	(0)
- * Club domestic league appearances and goals as of 16:24, 9 July 2026 (UTC)

Oskar Paprzycki (born 31 July 1998) is a Polish professional footballer who plays as a midfielder for IV liga Pomerania club Czarni Pruszcz Gdański.

== Career ==
Paprzycki started playing in the youth sides of Beniaminek 03 Starogard Gdański, KP Starogard Gdański, and AP Lechia Gdańsk, before joining the Lechia Gdańsk academy. Between 2015 and 2016 Paprzycki played with the Lechia Gdańsk II team in the III liga.

Paprzycki started his professional career in 2016 when he joined Kotwica Kołobrzeg, spending the season with the II liga club, making 24 league appearances in the process. The following season Paprzycki joined I liga side Chojniczanka Chojnice, with whom he spent three seasons with, making 69 appearances and scoring 3 goals during his stint at the club. In 2020 Paprzycki joined GKS Tychy after Chojniczanka suffered relegation to the II liga.

On 14 June 2022, he moved to another I liga side Odra Opole on a free transfer. On 24 June 2023, he left the club by mutual consent.

On 27 June, Paprzycki signed a one-year deal with II liga club Chojniczanka Chojnice.

After spending a year in Chojnice, on 20 June 2024 he moved to I liga club GKS Jastrzębie on a two-year deal. He and GKS agreed to part ways amicably on 25 June 2025.

On 3 July 2025, Paprzycki returned to his childhood club KP Starogard Gdański.
