= Maciej Osłowski =

Polish footballer

Personal information
- Full name: Maciej Osłowski
- Date of birth: 9 April 1988 (age 38)
- Place of birth: Gdańsk, Poland
- Height: 1.82 m (6 ft 0 in)
- Position: Defender

Team information
- Current team: Dragon Bojano (futsal)

Youth career
- –2008: Lechia Gdańsk

Senior career*
Years	Team	Apps	(Gls)
2008–2010	Lechia Gdańsk	0	(0)
2008–2010	Lechia Gdańsk II	4	(0)
2010–2011	Dolcan Ząbki	5	(0)
2011–2012	Kaszubia Kościerzyna	13	(0)
2012–2013	Polonia Gdańsk	15	(0)
2013–2016	Gryf Wejherowo	59	(7)
2014–2018	AZS Uniwersytet Gdański (futsal)	55	(37)
2017–2020	KP Sopot		
2018–	Dragon Bojano (futsal)	54	(36)
- * Club domestic league appearances and goals as of 9 April 2024

Maciej Osłowski (born 9 April 1988) is a Polish futsal player who plays for Dragon Bojano. He also played football professionally as a defender.

== Career ==
=== Lechia Gdańsk & Dolcan Ząbki ===
Osłowski started his career in the academy sides of his local team Lechia Gdańsk. In 2008 he progressed to feature for the club in the Młoda Ekstraklasa (MESA), making 27 appearances in his first season. The following season, Osłowski still featured for Lechia in the MESA, but featured more with the Lechia Gdańsk II team, as well as being included in the first team. Osłowski made his first team debut on 29 September 2009, playing against Nielba Wągrowiec in the Polish Cup. This proved to be his only first team appearance for the club, as it was later decided he was surplus to requirements, and was added to the transfer list at the end of the season. In total for Lechia, he made 40 appearances and scored 4 goals in the MESA, 7 appearances for Lechia II, and 1 appearance for the first team.

Over the summer Osłowski joined I liga side Dolcan Ząbki. While this move saw him making his first professional appearances in the league, he managed only 5 appearances all season, with 4 of those coming off the bench. After only one season with Dolcan the club decided to release Osłowski.

=== Lower divisions ===
Over the next few seasons Osłowski struggled to find stability with a club, joining new clubs in the following 3 summer transfer windows. The first club he joined was Kaszubia Kościerzyna in the III liga. He made 13 appearances over the season, joining Polonia Gdańsk at the start of the next season making 15 appearances in total. His following move saw some stability for Osłowski, joining Gryf Wejherowo with whom he played for the next 3 seasons. While at Gryf he made a total of 59 appearances and scored a total of 7 goals during this time. He was released at the end of the season, and saw himself without a club for the entirety of the 2016–17 season. In 2017 Osłowski returned to football, joining KP Sopot.

== Honours ==
Gryf Wejherowo

- III liga Pomerania–West Pomerania: 2014–15
