= Damian Kugiel =

Polish footballer (born 1995)

Personal information
- Full name: Damian Kugiel
- Date of birth: 30 May 1995 (age 31)
- Place of birth: Gdańsk, Poland
- Height: 1.87 m (6 ft 2 in)
- Position: Forward

Team information
- Current team: Tylko Lechia Gdańsk
- Number: 11

Youth career
- –2007: Olimpic Gdańsk
- 2008–2009: Olivia Gdańsk
- 2010: Lechia Gdańsk

Senior career*
Years	Team	Apps	(Gls)
2010–2015	Lechia Gdańsk II	39	(13)
2013–2015	Lechia Gdańsk	4	(0)
2014–2015	→ Kotwica Kołobrzeg (loan)	29	(5)
2016	KS Chwaszczyno	27	(11)
2017	Wierzyca Pelplin	16	(15)
2017–2018	Radunia Stężyca	28	(27)
2018	Bałtyk Gdynia	3	(0)
2019	AP Sopot		
2019	Sokół Zblewo		
2020–2023	GKS Kowale		
2023–2024	GKS Kolbudy	25	(4)
2024	Stoczniowiec Gdańsk	13	(14)
2025–2026	Sokół Bożepole Wielkie	25	(9)
2026–	Tylko Lechia Gdańsk	11	(5)

International career
2011–2012	Poland U17	7	(0)
2013	Poland U18	3	(0)
- * Club domestic league appearances and goals as of 09:50, 26 June 2026 (UTC)

Damian Kugiel (born 30 May 1995) is a Polish footballer who plays as a forward for regional league club Tylko Lechia Gdańsk.

== Honours ==
Wierzyca Pelplin

- IV liga Pomerania: 2016–17

Radunia Stężyca

- IV liga Pomerania: 2017–18
