= Paweł Czychowski =

Polish footballer (born 1993)

Personal information
- Full name: Paweł Czychowski
- Date of birth: 19 July 1993 (age 33)
- Place of birth: Gdańsk, Poland
- Height: 1.83 m (6 ft 0 in)
- Position: Forward

Team information
- Current team: Radunia Stężyca
- Number: 11

Youth career
- –2008: Olivia Gdańsk
- 2008–2011: Lechia Gdańsk

Senior career*
| Years | Team | Apps | (Gls) |
| 2011–2015 | Lechia Gdańsk | 1 | (0) |
| 2011–2015 | Lechia Gdańsk II | 74 | (25) |
| 2013 | → Puszcza Niepołomice (loan) | 7 | (0) |
| 2014 | → Cartusia Kartuzy (loan) | 13 | (8) |
| 2015–2019 | Gryf Wejherowo | 89 | (7) |
| 2019–2020 | GKS Przodkowo | 15 | (4) |
| 2021–2025 | Jaguar Gdańsk | 89 | (38) |
| 2025– | Radunia Stężyca | 42 | (20) |
- * Club domestic league appearances and goals as of 10:15, 3 July 2026 (UTC)

Paweł Czychowski (born 19 July 1993) is a Polish professional footballer who plays as a forward for IV liga Pomerania club Radunia Stężyca.

== Senior career ==
Czychowski began his career with Lechia Gdańsk, playing for Lechia's reserve team for most of his time at the club, playing 74 games and scoring 25 goals. In 2013, he joined Puszcza Niepołomice on loan for six months, where he appeared in seven matches. He made his senior debut for Lechia against Lech Poznań in 2014, in what turned out to be his only first team appearance for the club.

In 2015, Czychowski made a move to Gryf Wejherowo, spending four seasons with the club. In 2019, he moved to GKS Przodkowo.

== Honours ==
GKS Przodkowo

- IV liga Pomerania: 2019–20

Radunia Stężyca

- Regional league Gdańsk II: 2025–26
