= Daniel Mikołajewski (footballer, born 2006) =

Polish footballer (born 2006)

Personal information
- Date of birth: 24 January 2006 (age 20)
- Place of birth: Nienburg, Lower Saxony, Germany
- Height: 1.84 m (6 ft 0 in)
- Position: Forward

Team information
- Current team: Luzern (on loan from Parma)
- Number: 19

Youth career
- 2013–2016: Jaguar Kokoszki
- 2016–2019: Lechia Gdańsk
- 2019: → Jaguar Gdańsk (loan)
- 2019–2020: KTS-K Luzino
- 2020–2021: Lech Poznań
- 2020–2021: → Jaguar Gdańsk (loan)
- 2021: → Lotos Gdańsk (loan)
- 2022–: Parma

Senior career*
Years	Team	Apps	(Gls)
2021–2022	Jaguar Gdańsk	19	(9)
2024–	Parma	3	(0)
2024–2025	→ Zagłębie Lubin (loan)	10	(0)
2024–2025	→ Zagłębie Lubin II (loan)	9	(5)
2026–	→ Luzern (loan)	11	(4)

International career^{‡}
2021–2022	Poland U16	7	(6)
2022–2023	Poland U17	20	(9)
2023–2024	Poland U18	6	(11)
2024–2025	Poland U19	12	(9)
2025	Poland U20	2	(2)
2026–	Poland U21	6	(2)
- * Club domestic league appearances and goals as of 14:15, 10 November 2026 (UTC) ‡ National team caps and goals as of 21:27, 19 November 2026 (UTC)

Daniel Mikołajewski (born 24 January 2006) is a professional footballer who plays as a forward for Swiss Super League club Luzern, on loan from Serie A club Parma. Born in Germany, he represents Poland at youth international level.

== Club career ==
Born in Nienburg, Lower Saxony, Germany, Mikołajewski first played at youth level for multiple Pomeranian teams and Lech Poznań, before joining Parma's academy in Italy in the summer of 2022, after a trial at AS Roma in the previous winter.

He joined the Primavera squad of the Parmesan club, while the first team played the Serie B, two years after being relegated from Serie A. He soon became a regular starter with the under-20 team, whilst also proving to be a prolific goalscorer in the other age groups.

In the beginning of the 2024–25 season, he was moved to Parma's senior squad, but remained on the bench in the first four games of the season. On 6 September 2024, Mikołajewski returned to Poland to join Ekstraklasa club Zagłębie Lubin on a season-long loan.

On 12 April 2025, Mikołajewski made his debut for Parma as a 72nd-minute substitute for Gabriel Strefezza in a 1–1 draw to Napoli in the Serie A.

On 6 August 2026, he joined Swiss club Luzern on loan for the remainder of the season. Mikołajewski scored his first career hat-trick in a 5–1 victory over Grasshopper on 19 September.

== International career ==
Mikołajewski is a youth international for Poland, playing with the under-16 and under-17, taking part in the 2023 European championship with the latter.

He was a standout with Poland under-18s in September 2023 during a friendly tournament in Croatia that his team eventually won, scoring five goals in three games, most notably a hat-trick in a 4–0 win against Austria.

Mikołajewski started all three games played by the under-17s at the 2023 FIFA U-17 World Cup.

== Career statistics ==
As of match played 7 November 2026

Appearances and goals by club, season and competition
Club	Season	League			National cup (Note: Includes Polish Cup, Swiss Cup)		Other		Total	
Club	Season	Division	Apps	Goals	Apps	Goals	Apps	Goals	Apps	Goals
Jaguar Gdańsk	2021–22	IV liga Pomerania	19	9	—		—		19	9
Zagłębie Lubin (loan)	2024–25	Ekstraklasa	10	0	2	0	—		12	0
Zagłębie Lubin II (loan)	2024–25	II liga	9	5	0	0	—		9	5
Parma	2025–26	Serie A	3	0	0	0	—		3	0
Luzern (loan)	2026–27	Swiss Super League	11	4	1	0	—		12	4
Career total			52	18	3	0	0	0	55	18
