= Marcus Vinícius (footballer, born 1984) =

Brazilian footballer

Personal information
- Full name: Marcus Vinícius da Silva de Oliveira
- Date of birth: 29 March 1984 (age 42)
- Place of birth: Belford Roxo, Brazil
- Height: 1.82 m (5 ft 11 1/2 in)
- Position: Winger

Team information
- Current team: Arka Gdynia II
- Number: 8

Youth career
- Vasco da Gama

Senior career*
Years	Team	Apps	(Gls)
2007	Olaria		
2007	Angra dos Reis		
2008	Piast Choszczno		
2008	Czarni Żagań		
2009	Zdrój Ciechocinek	25	(16)
2010–2012	Orkan Rumia	39	(13)
2010–2011	→ GKS Bełchatów (loan)	20	(0)
2012–2023	Arka Gdynia	228	(50)
2012–2023	Arka Gdynia II	28	(16)
2023–2024	Wierzyca Pelplin	28	(11)
2024–	Arka Gdynia II	51	(19)
2024	Arka Gdynia	1	(0)
- * Club domestic league appearances and goals as of 10:52, 8 September 2026 (UTC)

Marcus Vinícius da Silva de Oliveira (born 29 March 1984) is a Brazilian professional footballer who plays as a winger for IV liga Pomerania club Arka Gdynia II.

== Career ==
In February 2010, he joined Orkan Rumia on a two-and-a-half-year contract. In the summer 2010, he was loaned to GKS Bełchatów on a one-year deal. He returned to Orkan one year later.

He joined Arka Gdynia in 2012 on a free transfer, winning promotion to Ekstraklasa as 2015–16 I liga champions. He also won the 2016–17 Polish Cup and both the 2017 and 2018 editions of the Polish Super Cup with the club.

On 3 July 2023, at the age of 39, he announced his departure from Arka. He made a total of 259 appearances for the club and was the then-leading goalscorer in their history, with 63 goals.

On 18 July that year, Vinícius joined regional league side Wierzyca Pelplin. He contributed to the club's group win and promotion to IV liga Pomerania by scoring 11 goals in 28 league appearances.

In the summer of 2024, he returned to Arka Gdynia, joining their reserve team in the regional league. In November, he was promoted to the first team to prepare for his farewell game. On 24 November 2024, he started the first eight minutes of a 5–1 win over Stal Stalowa Wola, with 63, his goal tally for Arka, as his shirt number. Vinícius left the pitch after eight minutes, matching the number he wore throughout his Arka career, to a guard of honour from both teams, and was replaced by Karol Czubak, who later in the game equalled and surpassed Vinícius as Arka's all-time best scorer and celebrated the former achievement along with Vinícius by the bench.

== Other ventures ==
He is a co-chairman of Energa Checz Marcus Gdynia, a women's football club he co-founded in 2019 with his father-in-law.

In April 2024, he successfully ran for a seat on the Gdynia city council in the 2024 Polish local elections, receiving 5,45% of all votes in his constituency.

== Personal life ==
In March 2017, he obtained Polish citizenship.

== Career statistics ==
As of match played 5 September 2026

Appearances and goals by club, season and competition
Club	Season	League			Polish Cup		Europe		Other		Total	
Club	Season	Division	Apps	Goals	Apps	Goals	Apps	Goals	Apps	Goals	Apps	Goals
Zdrój Ciechocinek	2008–09	III liga, gr. C	12	6	—		—		—		12	6
Zdrój Ciechocinek	2009–10	III liga, gr. C	13	10	—		—		—		13	10
Zdrój Ciechocinek	Total		25	16	—		—		—		25	16
Orkan Rumia	2009–10	III liga, gr. D	13	2	—		—		—		13	2
Orkan Rumia	2011–12	III liga, gr. D	26	11	—		—		—		26	11
Orkan Rumia	Total		39	13	—		—		—		39	13
GKS Bełchatów (loan)	2010–11	Ekstraklasa	20	0	2	1	—		—		22	1
Arka Gdynia	2012–13	I liga	31	15	1	0	—		—		32	15
Arka Gdynia	2013–14	I liga	20	4	5	3	—		—		25	7
Arka Gdynia	2014–15	I liga	28	9	0	0	—		—		28	9
Arka Gdynia	2015–16	I liga	31	7	1	1	—		—		32	8
Arka Gdynia	2016–17	Ekstraklasa	30	7	6	1	—		—		36	8
Arka Gdynia	2017–18	Ekstraklasa	13	0	4	1	2 (Note: Appearances in UEFA Europa League)	2	1 (Note: Appearance in Polish Super Cup)	0	20	3
Arka Gdynia	2018–19	Ekstraklasa	11	1	2	1	—		—		13	2
Arka Gdynia	2019–20	Ekstraklasa	16	3	1	0	—		—		17	3
Arka Gdynia	2020–21	I liga	25	3	6	4	—		1 (Note: Appearance in I liga promotion play-offs)	0	32	7
Arka Gdynia	2021–22	I liga	17	1	2	0	—		1	0	20	1
Arka Gdynia	2022–23	I liga	4	0	0	0	—		—		4	0
Arka Gdynia	Total		226	50	28	11	2	2	3	0	259	63
Arka Gdynia II	2012–13	III liga, gr. D	1	1	—		—		—		1	1
Arka Gdynia II	2014–15	III liga, gr. D	2	1	—		—		—		2	1
Arka Gdynia II	2017–18	IV liga Pomerania	2	0	—		—		—		2	0
Arka Gdynia II	2018–19	IV liga Pomerania	13	8	—		—		—		13	8
Arka Gdynia II	2022–23	IV liga Pomerania	11	6	—		—		—		11	6
Arka Gdynia II	Total		28	16	—		—		—		28	16
Wierzyca Pelplin	2023–24	Regional league Gdańsk II	28	11	—		—		—		28	11
Arka Gdynia II	2024–25	Regional league Gdańsk I	24	16	—		—		—		24	16
Arka Gdynia II	2025–26	IV liga Pomerania	21	2	—		—		—		21	2
Arka Gdynia II	2026–27	IV liga Pomerania	6	1	—		—		—		6	1
Arka Gdynia II	Total		51	19	—		—		—		51	19
Arka Gdynia	2024–25	I liga	1	0	—		—		—		1	0
Career total			419	125	30	12	2	2	3	0	454	139

== Honours ==
Arka Gdynia

- I liga: 2015–16
- Polish Cup: 2016–17
- Polish Super Cup: 2017, 2018

Wierzyca Pelplin

- Regional league Gdańsk II: 2023–24

Arka Gdynia II

- Regional league Gdańsk I: 2024–25
