= Łukasz Kowalski =

Polish footballer

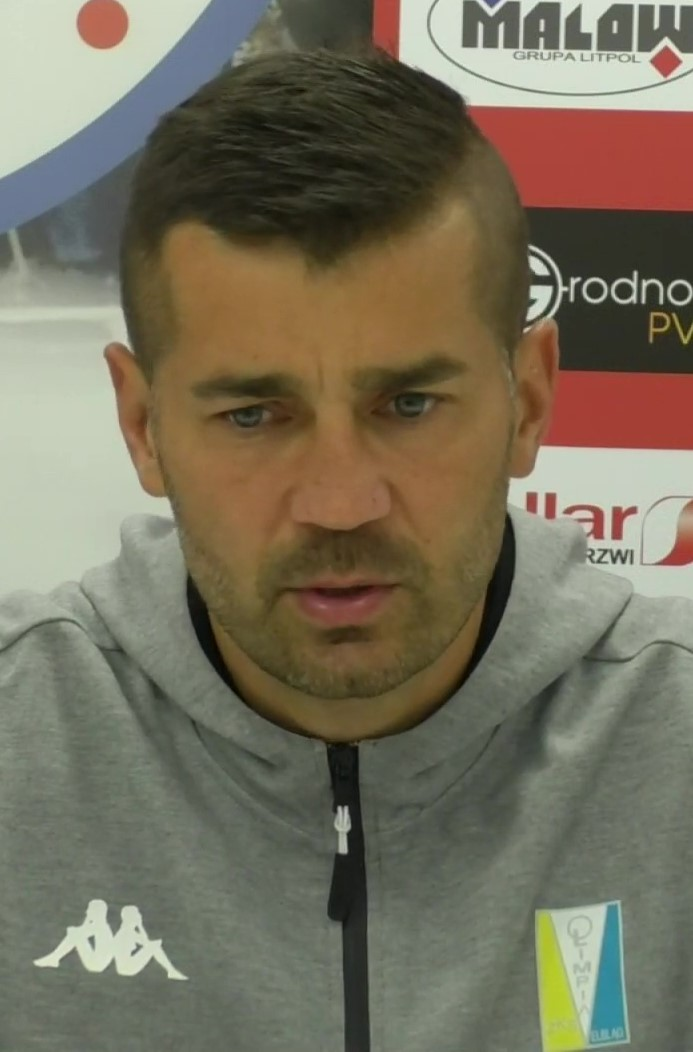
- Kowalski in 2020 with Olimpia Elbląg

Personal information
- Full name: Łukasz Kowalski
- Date of birth: 1 December 1980 (age 45)
- Place of birth: Łaszczów, Poland
- Height: 1.83 m (6 ft 0 in)
- Position: Defender

Team information
- Current team: Arka Gdynia (assistant)

Youth career
- Gedania Gdańsk
- MRKS Gdańsk

Senior career*
Years	Team	Apps	(Gls)
1999–2000	Gedania Gdańsk		
2000–2010	Arka Gdynia	230	(16)
2002	→ Kaszubia Kościerzyna (loan)		
2002–2003	→ Hetman Zamość (loan)	26	(2)
2010	Bałtyk Gdynia	5	(2)
2010–2012	Bruk-Bet Termalica Nieciecza	50	(1)
2012–2014	Bytovia Bytów	52	(4)
2014–2015	Arka Gdynia	12	(0)
2015–2017	KS Chwaszczyno	46	(2)

Managerial career
- 2016–2017: KS Chwaszczyno (player-manager)
- 2017–2019: KP Starogard Gdański
- 2019–2020: Gryf Wejherowo
- 2020: Olimpia Elbląg
- 2020–2022: GKS Przodkowo
- 2022–2024: KP Starogard Gdański
- 2024–2026: Arka Gdynia II
- * Club domestic league appearances and goals

Łukasz Kowalski (born 1 December 1980) is a Polish professional football manager and former player who played as defender. He is currently the assistant coach of I liga club Arka Gdynia.

== Managerial statistics ==
As of match played 1 April 2026

Managerial record by team and tenure
Team	From	To	Record							
Team	From	To	G	W	D	L	GF	GA	GD	Win %
KS Chwaszczyno (player-manager)	19 October 2016	June 2017	23	11	3	9	40	40	+0	47.83
KP Starogard Gdański	1 November 2017	30 June 2019	61	30	13	18	99	58	+41	49.18
Gryf Wejherowo	3 July 2019	29 June 2020	30	4	5	21	26	71	−45	13.33
Olimpia Elbląg	2 July 2020	5 October 2020	13	1	3	9	10	20	−10	7.69
GKS Przodkowo	28 October 2020	28 March 2022	45	10	8	27	41	87	−46	22.22
KP Starogard Gdański	6 September 2022	11 June 2024	65	19	12	34	89	132	−43	29.23
Arka Gdynia II	13 August 2024	1 April 2026	58	48	2	8	225	59	+166	82.76
Total			295	123	46	126	530	467	+63	41.69

== Honours ==
=== Managerial ===
KP Starogard Gdański

- Polish Cup (Pomerania regionals): 2017–18

Arka Gdynia II

- Regional league Gdańsk I: 2024–25
