= Marek Szutowicz =

Polish footballer (1977–2021)

Personal information
- Full name: Marek Szutowicz
- Date of birth: 22 February 1977
- Place of birth: Gdynia, Poland
- Date of death: 13 December 2021 (aged 44)
- Place of death: Gdańsk, Poland
- Height: 1.83 m (6 ft 0 in)
- Position: Defender

Youth career
- 1986–1995: Lechia Gdańsk
- 1995–1996: Kaszubia Kościerzyna

Senior career*
Years	Team	Apps	(Gls)
1996–1997	Lechia Gdańsk	14	(0)
2000–2001	Gedania Gdańsk		
2001–2002	Unia Tczew		
2002–2004	Lechia Gdańsk	37	(33)
Total		51	(33)

Managerial career
- 2020: Jaguar Gdańsk
- * Club domestic league appearances and goals

Marek Szutowicz (22 February 1977 – 13 December 2021) was a Polish footballer who played as a defender, and a football manager and coach.

== Playing career ==
Szutowicz started playing football with Lechia Gdańsk, representing the team's various youth sides and winning a Polish Junior Championship. In his early years he played as a winger, eventually transitioning into a defender. He spent some time with Kaszubia Kościerzyna, but returned to Lechia Gdańsk to start his professional playing career. He made his professional debut with Lechia in the II liga on 7 September 1996 against Szombierki Bytom. Szutowicz made 14 appearances in the II liga before a cruciate ligaments injury ended his professional playing career. Due to this Szutowicz started studying at the Academy of Physical Education and Sport in Gdańsk, eventually graduating and working as a teacher for ten years, and working closely with Lechia as a footballing coach from 1998. After three seasons away from football Szutowicz started playing again with Gedania Gdańsk in the lower leagues, spending the season with the club, and joining Unia Tczew for the season after. In 2002, a season after Lechia had to reform in the lowest divisions, Szutowicz joined the playing squad once again while the team were in the fifth tier of Polish football. Over the next two seasons he made 37 appearances and scored 33 goals from defence, while also helping the team to win two promotions and win two divisional titles. He officially retired from all forms of playing aged 27, later admitting that helping Lechia while in the lower divisions may have damaged his body more due to previous injuries.

== Coaching career ==
After retiring after his second stint with Lechia Szutowicz went back to coaching with the Lechia youth teams. In 2009 he was given the opportunity to coach the first team, being responsible for physical preparation and fitness regimes for injured players, a position he held until 2014. He went on to coach with other teams including Bytovia Bytów before ending up with Jaguar Gdańsk. He worked as a coach with Jaguar, eventually becoming the club's first team manager. He led the club to its greatest success, winning the regional Polish Cup, and leading the club to featuring in their first ever Polish Cup game. He held the role as the club's manager until a few months after winning the cup due to being diagnosed with cancer. He continued to hold roles within the coaching set up of the club while battling cancer, eventually leaving during the autumn months in 2021 to focus on the treatment needed to fight against the cancer.

== Personal life ==
In 2020 Szutowicz was diagnosed with RMS cancer. To help support Szutowicz receive the best care available, and to help support him financially throughout his care, several fundraisers were set up by Jaguar Gdańsk. One such fundraiser was an auction which saw many Polish internationals and players around Poland donating items, one such item being an Arkadiusz Milik match worn shirt signed by the Olympique Marseille squad. Another fundraiser was an Oldboy Lechia team playing against a Jaguar, GKS Kowale and friends team playing in a friendly. Szutowicz died on 13 December 2021, at the age of 44.

== Honours ==
=== Player ===
Lechia Gdańsk

- District League (group II): 2002–03
- IV League (Pomerania): 2003–04

=== Manager ===
Jaguar Gdańsk

- Pomeranian ZPN Polish Cup: 2020
