= Filip Burkhardt =

Polish footballer

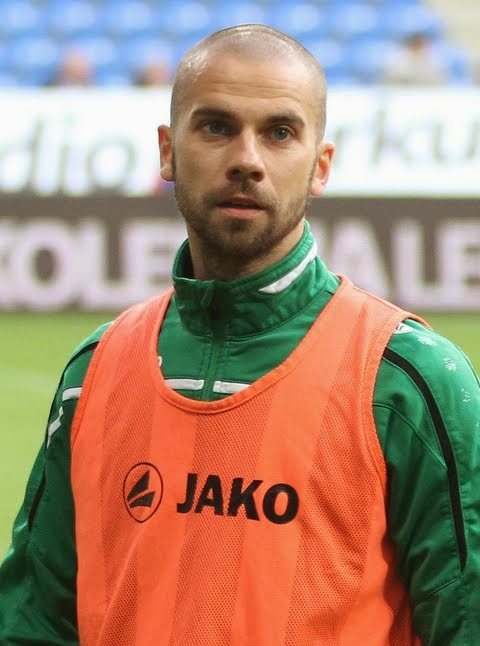

Personal information
- Full name: Filip Burkhardt
- Date of birth: 23 March 1987 (age 39)
- Place of birth: Poznań, Poland
- Height: 1.74 m (5 ft 9 in)
- Position: Midfielder

Team information
- Current team: Salos Rumia
- Number: 10

Youth career
- 2000–2002: Maczki Poznań
- 2003: Amica Wronki

Senior career*
Years	Team	Apps	(Gls)
2003–2006	Amica Wronki	38	(5)
2006–2008	Lech Poznań	0	(0)
2006	→ Widzew Łódź (loan)	2	(0)
2007	→ Jagiellonia Białystok (loan)	7	(0)
2008	→ Tur Turek (loan)	14	(1)
2008–2009	Warta Poznań	24	(5)
2009–2011	Arka Gdynia	34	(1)
2011–2012	Sandecja Nowy Sącz	37	(5)
2013–2014	Wisła Płock	55	(11)
2014–2016	Górnik Łęczna	17	(0)
2015–2016	→ GKS Katowice (loan)	19	(2)
2016–2017	Olimpia Elbląg	12	(0)
2017–2018	ŁKS Łódź	8	(0)
2018–2019	Bytovia Bytów	29	(5)
2019–2021	Radunia Stężyca	48	(7)
2021–2024	FK Toten		
2024	Gryf Wejherowo	14	(0)
2024–2025	Wierzyca Pelplin	31	(2)
2025–	Salos Rumia	14	(4)

International career
2006	Poland U19	3	(0)
- * Club domestic league appearances and goals as of 09:49, 21 February 2026 (UTC)

Filip Burkhardt (born 23 March 1987) is a Polish professional footballer who plays as a midfielder for regional league club Salos Rumia.

== Club career ==
Of a very slight physical presence, Burkhardt made his Ekstraklasa debut on 11 June 2004. He played for several Polish top flight teams like Amica Wronki and Lech Poznań. In 2006, he joined Widzew Łódź on loan. In 2007, he was loaned to Jagiellonia Białystok from Lech Poznań. In June 2008, he signed a contract with Warta Poznań. In 2009, he moved to Arka Gdynia.

In August 2011, he joined Sandecja Nowy Sącz on a one-year contract.

== International career ==
He was a part of Poland national under-19 team.

== Personal life ==
He is the brother of Marcin Burkhardt.

== Honours ==
Wisła Płock

- II liga East: 2012–13

Radunia Stężyca

- III liga, group II: 2020–21
