= Robert Chwastek =

Polish midfielder

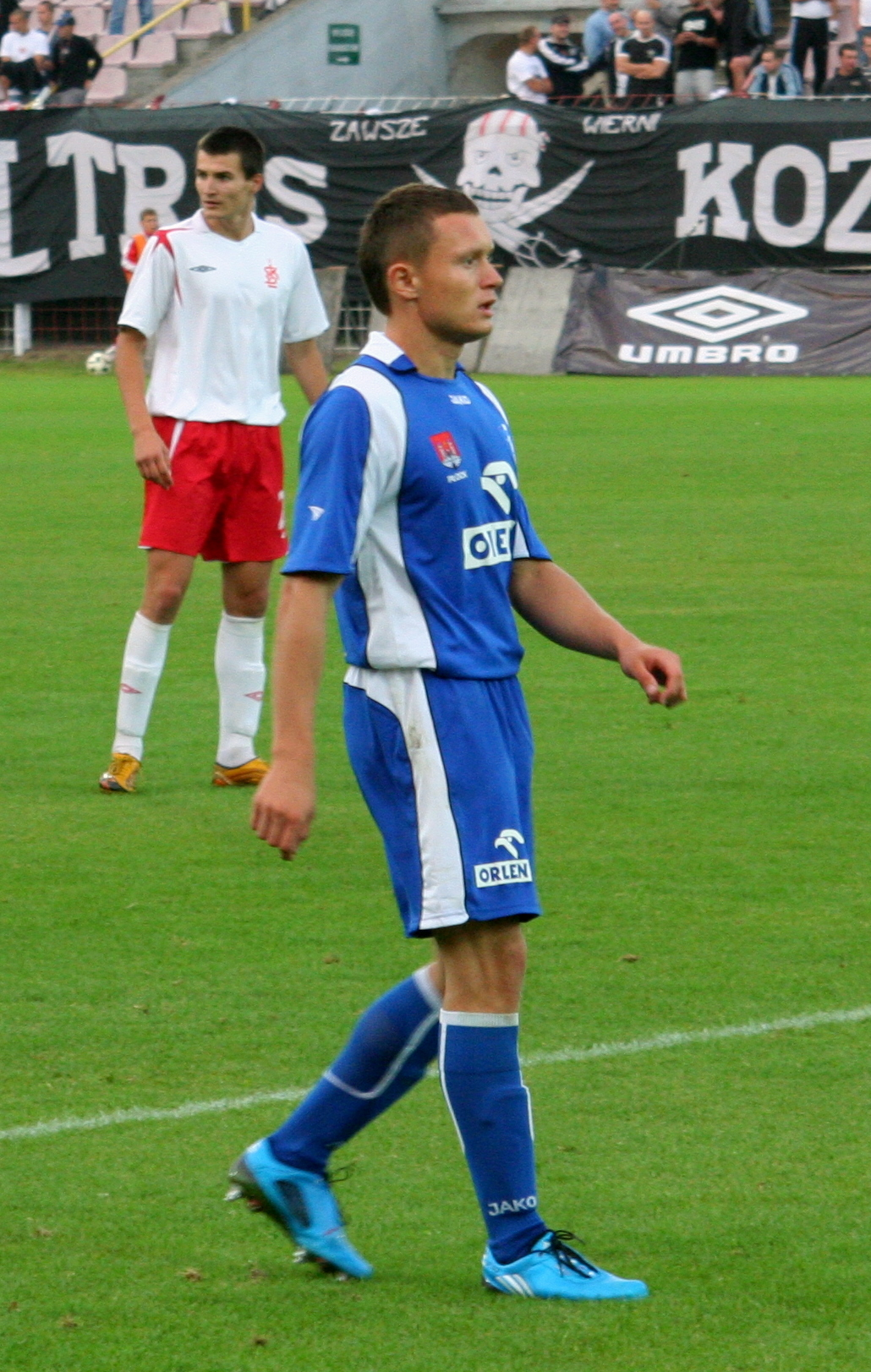
- Chwastek with Wisła Płock in 2009

Personal information
- Full name: Robert Chwastek
- Date of birth: 11 September 1988 (age 38)
- Place of birth: Chorzów, Poland
- Height: 1.72 m (5 ft 8 in)
- Position: Midfielder

Team information
- Current team: Raków Częstochowa (head of scouting)

Youth career
- KS Stadion Śląski
- Józefka Chorzów
- Zantka Chorzów
- 2005–2006: UKS SMS Łódź

Senior career*
Years	Team	Apps	(Gls)
2006–2007	UKS SMS Bałucz		
2007–2008	GKS Bełchatów	12	(2)
2008–2012	Wisła Płock	61	(1)
2012–2013	Dolcan Ząbki	28	(2)
2013–2014	Ruch Chorzów	2	(0)
2014–2015	Siarka Tarnobrzeg	23	(1)
2015–2016	Grunwald Ruda Śląska	28	(8)
2016–2017	Gryf Wejherowo	33	(7)
2017–2018	GKS Bełchatów	24	(1)
2018–2019	Gryf Wejherowo	33	(1)
2019–2020	Sokół Ostróda	17	(2)
2020–2021	Polonia Bytom	18	(0)
2021	→ Gwarek Tarnowskie Góry (loan)	18	(1)
2021–2024	Drama Zbrosławice	64	(12)
2024–2026	Polonia Bytom II	7	(1)
- * Club domestic league appearances and goals

Robert Chwastek (born 11 September 1988) is a Polish former professional footballer who played as a midfielder. He is currently the head of scouting of Ekstraklasa club Raków Częstochowa.

== Honours ==
Sokół Ostróda

- III liga, group I: 2019–20

Drama Zbrosławice

- Regional league Silesia I: 2021–22
- Polish Cup (Bytom regionals): 2023–24
