= Gryf Słupsk =

- Full name: Klub Sportowy; Gryf Słupsk
- Nicknames: Rycerze Księstwa Słupskiego (The Knights of the Słupsk Principality); Trójkolorowi
- Founded: 1956; 70 years ago
- Ground: Zielona 9 Street Stadium
- Capacity: 1,500
- Chairman: Mirosław Lewandowski
- Manager: Krzysztof Müller
- League: IV liga Pomerania
- 2024–25: III liga, group II, 17th of 18 (relegated)
- Website: https://gryf-slupsk.pl
Home colours	Away colours

Gryf Słupsk, also known as Energa Gryf Słupsk for sponsorship reasons, is a Polish multi-sports club in Słupsk, Pomerania. It is best known for its association football team, which competes in the IV liga Pomerania, following relegation from group II of the III liga in 2025.

== History ==
Gryf was created at the end of 1956 after a merger of four local factory clubs: KS Unia, from the local furniture factory (Słupskie Fabryki Mebli); KS Traktor, from the agricultural mechanization repair works (Zakłady Naprawczych Mechanizacji Rolnictwa abbreviated to ZNMR); KS Stal, the club of the "Famarol" agricultural tools factory (Fabryka Narzędzi Rolniczych FAMAROL); and KS Sparta, from the "Sezamor" ship equipment and tools factory (Słupska Fabryka Sprzętu Okrętowego „SEZAMOR”).

The club's chosen colours were white and green. The football section of the club was founded in 1957. It was that year that the Polish Football Association started up the III Division, in which Gryf were allowed to participate. The first coach was Bronislaw Koziar, a former Pogoń Lwów player.

Prior to that, from 1946 KS Gwardia Słupsk functioned, with the club colours red - white - blue, which was the only predecessor of the later ZGKS Gryf. Official, historical and archival data frequently refers to Gryf from 1946 onwards. However, this is a common mistake as the clubs only merged in 1964, when it changed it became Gryf and changed to the tricolour, which are official emblems of the club to this day. For seven years (1957–64) the clubs operated as two completely different and independent clubs alongside each other.

The School of Civic Military Police began operating in Słupsk in 1945. At the end of the first year of its operations, the idea to set up their own sports club arose. The infrastructure had to be based on city-owned facilities, but the club was operated by school staff and nearly all the members were school attendees. First meeting and discussions on the future of the club took place 26 April 1946, and the club officially came into being on 7 May. The club was called Klub Sportowy Centrum Wyszkolenia Milicji Obywatelskiej or KS CWMO for short. The first president was Józef Romański. In 1947, KS CWMO was soon renamed Gwardia. It gained promotion to the West Pomeranian A-klasa. Already in 1947, KS CWMO players tried their hand at international matches, losing to the Hungarian police team 3–9 and 4–0. However, the level of football of the Hungarians at the time was clearly superior to that of other countries in Europe, the time of the "golden eleven" - runners-up in the World Cup of 1958.

Gwardia was in the A-klasa in 1948, taking fourth place and winning the fair play trophy. A season later, they were Western Pomerania champions. They were the first team from the Słupsk region, to win the title. Gwardia was consistently ahead of the three Szczecin clubs, Spójnia, Ogniwo and Kolejarz.

After expanding the II Division in 1950, Gwardia was admitted to the league. In the first season they came in last place in their group. However, in the play-off matches to stay up, they beat Gwardia Koszalin 4–2 and 5–0. The following season, they performed better, and they found themselves in fifth place, ahead of clubs from Bydgoszcz, Gdańsk, Szczecin and Toruń. But another league pyramid reorganization, reducing the number of teams in the league, meant Gwardia found themselves in the third division. Two years later, due to the dissolution of the Citizens Militia Training Centre ( Centrum Wyszkolenia Milicji Obywatelskiej), Gwardia was also disbanded.

Such a turn of events had already been predicted by journalists. In 1948, "Kurier Słupski" published an article, exposing the loose link between the civic military police clubs and the cities they resided in, as moving of headquarters was frequent.

After six years of the clubs life history has confirmed the validity of the thesis. Fortunately, in 1959, the Gwardia was reactivated. In 1964, it merged with Gryf, forming the current club existing since 1956.

Gwardia had the colours red, white and blue, as did all the Gwardia clubs such as Wisła Kraków, Gwardia Koszalin, Błękitni Kielce and Olimpia Poznań.

Ludowy Klub Sportowy Gryf, operated until 1958, when it was renamed Zjednoczony Klub Sportowy Gryf (ZKS Gryf), operating at the furniture factory. President of the club was then the CEO of the Slupsk Furniture Factory, Jerzy Albrecht. A large contribution to the club was made by factory workers Zbigniew Bieńkowski, Aleksander Bucki and Jerzy Razik.

In 1964, there was the first merger, and post-merger with Gwardia Slupsk, uniformed activists joined the club. Then, the club changed its prefix name to ZKS and then ZGKS. This state of affairs lasted until the early '80s, when the club adopted the name Guards Sports Club (GKS) "Gryf". In the summer of 1988 there was a second team already fused with Czarni Słupsk. The next name change came in 1990, after the end of the autumn round of the league. At the general meeting of the members of the club, it was decided to remove the Klub Gwardyjski from the name.

Gryf is the sole heir of the whole tradition of football in Słupsk. Famous players over the years have included: Paweł Kryszałowicz, Iwan Tomasz, Marek Godlewski, Maciej Stolarczyk, Czesław Boguszewicz and Ryszard Szpakowski. There were also many others who have appeared in the Polish national youth teams or played in the top division in later years.

The most successful period is a struggle in the second league in 1981-1983 seasons and reached the 1/8 Polish Cup final in the 1976–77 season. In those years, the stadium at Green Street was visited by teams from Ekstraklasa. After the regional competition they eliminated Arka Gdynia, but were knocked out by Legia Warsaw on 9 November 1977 by a score of 0–3. The visiting Legia played a very strong side with Kazimierz Deyna, Marek Kusto, Lesław Ćmikiewicz, and Adam Topolski. Their coach was Andrzej Strejlau. In the 1981–82 season, Gryf won fifth place at the end of the tournament in the second league.

Since then, the club has played in the III, IV and V divisions.

== Etymology, club colours and crest ==
Gryf's predecessor, Gwardia, had the colours red, white and blue, as did all the Gwardia clubs such as Wisła Kraków, Gwardia Koszalin, Błękitni Kielce and Olimpia Poznań. Gwardia was disbanded in 1952, however it was re-instated in 1959.

Four local factory clubs, Unia, Stal, Traktor, and Sparta merged in 1956. The colours chosen were white and green for the new club and it was called Gryf.

In 1964 the two clubs Gryf and Gwardia merged, adopted the military patronage of Gwardia, keeping the blue, red and white strip and the traditional Gwardian crest similar to that of Olimpia Poznań, Gwardia Warsaw and rivals Gwardia Koszalin. The white and green colours of the pre-merger Gryf was adopted as the away kit.

Although the club has now disassociated and distanced itself from its past civic military police patronage, the club colours and crest has remained unchanged.

The name Gryf means "Griffin" in Polish. The Griffin which is featured in the coat of arms of Pomerania and a traditional regional symbol also appears at the top of the club's crest.

== Supporters and rivalries ==
Gryf have a small but fanatical support. Many of the fans sympathise with Lechia Gdańsk, and the fans of the local basketball team Czarni Slupsk frequently support Gryf as well, as Gryf supporters attending Czarni's matches. Both Czarni and Gryf fans were instrumental in the protests surrounding the killing of a basketball fan by the police in 1998, which led to the 1998 Słupsk riots.

They have a fierce rivalry with neighbouring Gwardia Koszalin. Both clubs have a similar 'Gwardian' history and the rivalry between the two cities of Koszalin and Slupsk frequently extends far beyond sport. Pogoń Lębork are also fierce local rivals.

== Honours ==
- I liga
  - 5th place: 1981–82
- Polish Cup
  - Round of 16: 1976–77
- Regional Polish Cup (Pomeranian Voivodeship)
  - Winners: 2016–17, 2018–19, 2024–25

== Judo ==
The club has also a very successful judo section, initiated in 1958 as self-defence classes. Since then the club has produced many Olympians and national champions, including team championship wins as a club, especially in the 80s and 90s.
