= Pomezania Malbork =

Polish sports club

- Full name: Młodzieżowy Ośrodek Piłkarski; Pomezania Malbork
- Nickname: Pomka
- Founded: 23 July 1990; 35 years ago
- Ground: Stadion Miejski
- Capacity: 1,730
- President: Radosław Rabenda
- Coach: Paweł Szajrych
- League: IV liga Pomerania
- 2023–24: IV liga Pomerania, 8th of 18
- Website: http://www.pomezania.pl/
Home colours	Away colours	Traditional colours

Pomezania Malbork is a sports club based in Malbork, Poland. The club now focuses solely on football, but previously also had a handball team. The football team was formed as "Bractwo Piłkarskie ″Pomezania″ Malbork" in 1990 the club became known by its current official name MOP ″Pomezania″ Malbork" in 2006. The team has been more successful in its early years, playing in the II liga, but has spent the last two decades playing in the lower divisions of Polish football.

== History ==
Pomezania Malbork was created on 23 July 1990 after the initiative of Siegfried Kruczkowski and other local football enthusiasts with the team taking the place of MMKS ″Nogat″ in the league. In 1991 Polish pasta company Danuta Malma became the main sponsor of the club, with the aim of developing the club and making the team more competitive in the Polish leagues. That same season Pomezania finished 2nd in their III liga group, just missing out on promotion to the second tier. At the end of the season Jerzy Jastrzębowski became manager leading the club to 5th in his first season. In the 1993–94 season Pomezania were promoted to the II liga after winning their group, winning 24 of their 30 games during the season. Pomezania's first season in the II liga was a success, with the team finishing comfortably in 9th and without losing a game at home all season. After a series of manager sackings and disappointing results Pomezania failed to capitalise on their strong start in the II liga and were relegated to the third division at the end of the 1995–96 season. After relegation the important sponsorship from Danuta Malma was ceased with Pomezania falling down the leagues. The new club president, Waldemar Jastrzebski, put a stop to the club's decline and oversaw the promotion back into the third tier in the 1998–99 season. After the reorganization of the leagues' structure the team found themselves in the fourth tier, finishing third in their groups in both 2001–02 and 2002–03. In 2006 after falling into the fifth tier the BP Pomezania team filed for bankruptcy and the team became MOP Pomezania. After two seasons under the new leadership the team again returned to the IV liga.

== Colours ==
The official club colours are yellow, black and white. In the early years the Pomezania home kit was yellow shirts, black shorts, and white socks.

== Handball ==
Pomezania Malbork had an official Handball team until 2019, known as SPR Pomezania Malbork and were known as Polski Cukier Pomezania for sponsorship reasons. The team played in the second division until the Polski Cukier sponsor withdrew from Pomezania, leading the club to fold shortly after.

== Honours ==
- II liga
  - Ninth place: 1994–95

III liga (group VI)

  - Champions: 1993–94
  - Runners-up: 1991–92
