= Sokół Zblewo =

LZS Sokół Zblewo
- Full name: Ludowy Zespół Sportowy Sokół Zblewo
- Founded: 1923; 103 years ago
- Ground: Boisko Sportowe Zblewo
- Chairman: Rafał Kondysiak
- Coach: Leszek Różycki
- League: Klasa B Gdańsk VI
- 2025–26: 1st of 14
- Website: Sokół Zblewo on Facebook
Home colours	Away colours

LZS Sokół Zblewo is a football club based in Zblewo, Poland. As of the 2026–27 season, they compete in the Gdańsk III group of Klasa A, after gaining promotion from Klasa B the previous season.

== History ==
In the 2019–20 Sokół Zblewo won their group of the regional league meaning they competed the following season in the IV Liga for the first time in their history. In the 2020–21 season the club had to withdraw from the division after playing 20 of 29 scheduled matches, finishing bottom of the table with 11 points.

== Ground ==
Sokół Zblewo's home ground is the Boisko Sportowe Zblewo. In 2021 the first stage in the modernisation of the ground was completed using funds allocated from a 2017 Ministry of Sport initiative. A new pitch was laid, the stands were renovated, and an innovative ecological irrigation system using rainwater runoff was installed.

== Colours ==
The club's home colours are all green with a white collar. Their away kit is black with white stripes and green socks.

== See also ==
- Sokół movement
