= Kaszubia Kościerzyna =

Polish football club

- Founded: 1946
- Ground: Stadion Miejski; Kościerzyna, Poland
- Capacity: 978
- Chairman: (Poland) Piotr Dziemiński
- Manager: (Poland) Marcin Martyniuk
- League: IV liga (V tier)
- 2024–25: Regional league Gdańsk II, 2nd of 16
- Website: kskaszubia.pl
Home colours	Away colours

Kaszubia Kościerzyna is a football club based in the Kashubian town of Kościerzyna, northern Poland. They play in IV liga (5th level). The club's prefix Kaszubia refers to its Kashubian regional and ethnic identity.

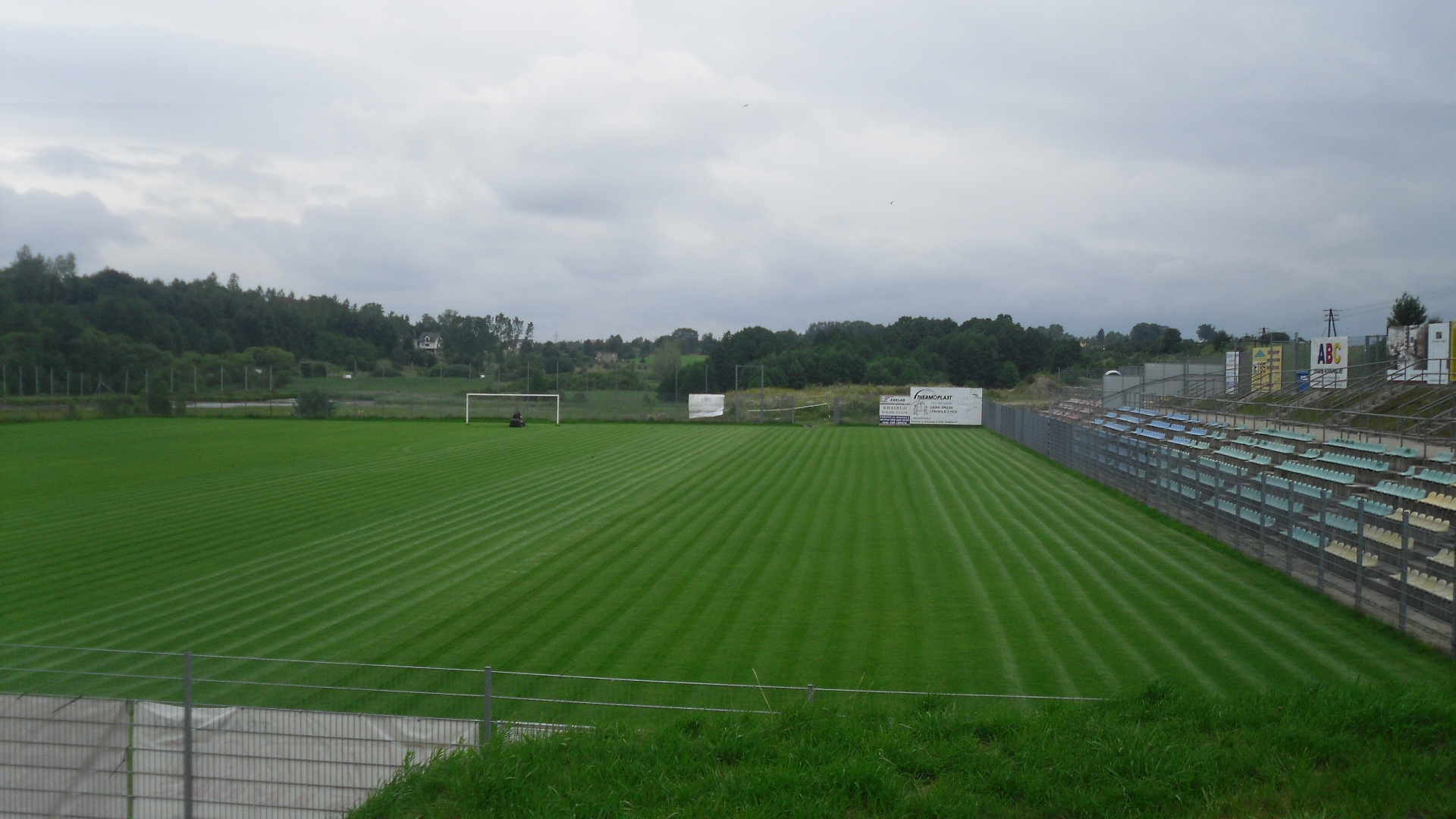
Ground: Stadion Miejski

== History ==
The beginning of football in Kościerzyna can be traced back to the very early 20th Century. The first club of note was Towarzystwo Gimnastyczne Sokół which had one of their branches in the town in 1922. There were many other smaller, mostly school teams which would play regularly in the local area. However, the first club to participate in formal league competition and to be registered with the Polish FA was Sokół Kościerzyna which registered in 1939 with the intent to debut in 1940. However, World War II broke out and the club never resumed activity after the war, with MKS Kościerzyna filling the void in 1945, which only had a football section though. The club only lasted a year before the multi-sports club "Kaszubia" was created on the basis of MKS, and started playing in 1946 from the bottom of the footballing pyramid. The club continued to play amateur football as it remained in the lowest 3 divisions of Polish football right until 1987/88 when they finally got promoted the district league. In 1994/95 they reached the III division which to this day is their highest. Relegation in the 2001/02 season was overshadowed by its joint biggest success in its history, when they won the Pomeranian Polish Cup, a feat they repeated in the 2009/10 season. In 2006 the stadium and its facilities were rebuilt and modernised where the senior team continues to play in the fourth tier.

== Fans ==
Kaszubia has an organised supporters association since 2003. The overwhelming majority of Kaszubia fans are also fans of Arka Gdynia with whom they established friendly relations in the 1980s and to this day attend matches under the banner of the local Arka fan-club. As with most of the region of Kashubia, their allegiances are split along the Tricity rivalry, with amiable relations with fans of clubs which sympathise with Arka such as Wisła Tczew and Gryf Wejherowo and rivalries with clubs who sympathise with Lechia Gdańsk such as Bytovia Bytów and Chojniczanka Chojnice and other clubs who are considered Arka's rivals such as Bałtyk Gdynia. Their biggest rivals are considered to be Cartusia Kartuzy, with whom they fiercely contest the Kashubian Derby.

== Honours ==
- Regional Polish Cup (Pomeranian Voivodeship);
  - Winners: 2000–01, 2009–10, 2011–12
  - Runners-up: 2005–06, 2012–13, 2019–20
- III liga;
  - Runners-up: 1997–98
