= Czarni Pruszcz Gdański =

Polish sports club

- Full name: Miejski Klub Sportowy Czarni Pruszcz Gdański
- Nickname: Czarni (The Blacks)
- Founded: 1961; 65 years ago
- Ground: MOSiR Stadium
- Capacity: 2,000
- Chairman: Szymon Chrostowski
- Manager: Krystian Ryczkowski
- League: IV liga Pomerania
- 2025–26: IV liga Pomerania, 6th of 18
- Website: czarnipruszcz.pl
Home colours	Away colours	Third colours

Czarni Pruszcz Gdański is a Polish football club from Pruszcz Gdański. They play in the IV liga Pomerania, the fifth tier of Polish football.

== History ==
The club were founded in 1961. Throughout the club's history, they have played in the lower regional divisions in Poland. The club have only had success in the Pomeranian leagues, with their only competition win coming in 2006 by winning the Pomeranian Voivodeship Polish Cup. For three seasons from 2005 until 2008, Czarni played in the IV liga for the only time in their history, with their highest finish being 8th in the 2005–06 season. For the 2006–07 season Czarni were included in the Polish Cup for which they qualified after winning the Pomeranian Voivodeship Polish Cup. They beat Kłos Pełczyce 6–1 in the preliminary round, before losing to Jagiellonia Białystok in the first round.

== Women's team ==
A women's side was created in 2015 and played three seasons before disbanding in 2019.

== Honours ==
- IV liga highest finish: 2005–06 (8th place)
- Pomeranian Voivodeship Polish Cup: 2005–06
- Polish Cup (1st round): 2006–07
