= Gryf Tczew =

Association football club in Tczew, Poland

KP Gryf Tczew
- Full name: Klub Piłkarski Gryf Tczew
- Founded: 2009; 17 years ago
- Ground: Stadion Miejski im. Alfonsa Guzińskiego
- Capacity: 1,292
- Coach: Ireneusz Cymanowski and Grzegorz Klarecki
- League: Regional league Gdańsk II
- 2025–26: Regional league Gdańsk II, 3rd of 16
- Website: KP Gryf Tczew on Facebook
Home colors	Away colors

Gryf Tczew is a football club based in Tczew, Kociewie, Poland. As of the 2026–27 season, they compete in the Gdańsk II group of the regional league, after finishing 3rd the previous year. Their home ground is the Stadion Miejski im. Alfonsa Guzińskiego.

== History ==
=== Foundation ===
The club was originally founded in 2009 as a merger of local sides Wisła Tczew and Unia Tczew. The initiation of a new football club for Tczew was presented as a solution to the historical lack of success of the latter teams, both established in the 1920s. Suggestions of a merger to create a single team for the town had been in discussion for over a decade before it took place. However, the move was considered controversial by many fans as their allegiances were split along the Tricity rivalry, with supporters of Unia having friendly relations with those of Lechia Gdańsk, and those of Wisła with Arka Gdynia. Despite these opposing fan cultures, the footballing sections of both clubs were united under the name Gryf 2009 Tczew and allowed to enter the IV liga Pomerania by the local Polish Football Association under Unia's licence. The new club had an equal number of representatives from the merged teams on its board and was granted annual funding of 95,000 PLN by the local authorities, which had previously been withheld until a merger was agreed.

=== Splits ===
In 2015, disenchanted Wisła fans reactivated its football section, joining the Klasa B. The following year, the women's section of Gryf broke away to form a new club named Pogoń Tczew.

=== Success ===
In the 2023–24 season, Gryf won the Gdańsk IV group of the Klasa A, winning promotion to the regional league. The following season, the club finished in third place, allowing them to enter the playoffs for the IV liga. They eventually lost the playoff final against Sokół Bożepole Wielkie, missing out on promotion that year. The following season Gryf repeated their league success with another third-place finish. However, they were eliminated from the playoff's by AS Kolbudy.
