= Rodło Kwidzyn =

Polish football club

- Full name: Kwidzyński Klub Sportowy Rodło Kwidzyn
- Nickname(s): Rodełko
- Founded: 1946; 79 years ago
- Ground: Stadion KCSiR
- Capacity: 2,500
- Chairman: Krzysztof Pierepienko
- Manager: Marek Śmiokło
- League: Regional league Gdańsk II
- 2023–24: Regional league Gdańsk II, 11th of 15
Home colours

Rodło Kwidzyn is a football club based in Kwidzyn, Poland. As of the 2024–25 season, they compete in the Gdańsk II group of the regional league.

== Honours ==
=== Domestic ===
- Polish Cup
  - Round of 32: 1997–98
