= Olimpia Sztum =

Polish sports club

- Full name: Klub Piłkarski Olimpia Sztum
- Founded: 1 May 1945; 80 years ago
- Ground: Stadion Miejski
- Capacity: 500
- Chairman: Emilia Więcaszek
- Manager: Sławomir Erber
- League: Klasa A Gdańsk IV
- 2022–23: Regional league Gdańsk II, 17th of 18 (relegated)
- Website: olimpiasztum.pl
Home colours	Away colours

Olimpia Sztum is a football club based in Sztum, Poland.

== History ==
Typically the club has played in the lower divisions throughout its existence. The high point of Olimpia's history was during the 2003–04 and the 2004–05 seasons. In 2003–04 the club won the regional Polish Cup for the Pomeranian region, beating Lechia Gdańsk in the final. Due to winning this competition, the club qualified for the national Polish Cup for the following season. Olimpia beat Jagiellonia Białystok in the first round to qualify for the group stage, eventually finishing third in their group and being knocked out of the competition.

=== Historical club names ===
The names the club has used throughout its history.

- 1946: KS Gryf Sztum
- 1950: MKS Gwardia Sztum
- 1956: LZS Sztum
- 1959: KS Olimpia Sztum
- 1964: GKS Olimpia Sztum
- 1972: LZS Sztum
- 1974: ZKP POM Sztum
- 1978: LKS Powiśle Czernin
- 1993: KP Olimpia Sztum

== Honours ==
- Regional Polish Cup (Pomeranian region): 2003–04
