= KP Sopot =

Polish football club

- Full name: Klub Piłkarski Sopot
- Nickname: Piraci (The Pirates)
- Founded: 1987; 39 years ago as MOSiR Sopot
- Ground: Stadion Leśny
- Capacity: 1,000
Home colours	Away colours

KP Sopot is a Polish football club based in Sopot, in the Pomeranian Voivodeship of northern Poland. They compete in the eighth tier of Polish football, Klasa B, group Gdańsk II. In the 2007–08 season, they came through multiple rounds of regional qualification to reach the national rounds of the Polish Cup.

== Name changes ==
- From 1987 – MOSiR (Miejski Ośrodek Sportu i Rekreacji) Sopot
- From 1997 – FC (Football Club) Sopot
- From 2001 – KP (Klub Piłkarski) Sopot
- From 2017 – KP (Klub Piłkarski) Mewa Sopot
- From 2025 – KP (Klub Piłkarski) Sopot

== Supporters groups ==
Sopot Ultras, Killer Mewy, Monciak Mob, Sea Dogs i Chłopcy z Placu Rybaka.

== Achievements ==
- 2001–02 season – Promoted to IV liga Pomerania
- 2002–03 season – 8th place in IV liga Pomerania
- 2007–08 season – winners of the Pomerania regional Polish Cup
