= IV liga Pomerania =

- Organising body: Pomeranian Football Association
- Founded: 2000; 26 years ago
- Country: Poland
- Number of clubs: 18
- Level on pyramid: 5
- Promotion to: III liga, group II
- Relegation to: Liga okręgowa
- Current champions: Gedania Gdańsk (2nd title) (2025–26)
- Most championships: Seven clubs (2 titles each)
- Sponsor(s): RWS Investment Group

IV liga Pomerania group (grupa pomorska), also known as IV liga RWS Investment Group for sponsorship reasons, is one of the groups of IV liga, the fifth level of Polish football league system.

The league was created in the 2000–01 season, after a new administrative division of Poland was implemented. Until the end of the 2007–08 season, IV liga was the fourth tier of league system, but this was changed with the formation of the Ekstraklasa as the top level league in Poland.

The clubs from Pomeranian Voivodeship compete in the group. The winner is promoted to III liga, group II. The bottom teams are relegated to their respective regional groups of the regional league.

== Season 2000-01 ==
Pos	Team	Pld	W	D	L	GF	GA	GD	Pts	Qualification or relegation
1	Chojniczanka Chojnice	38	27	4	7	118	41	+77	85	Promoted to III liga
2	Cartusia Kartuzy	38	26	6	6	114	39	+75	84	
3	Wisła Tczew	38	23	6	9	85	45	+40	75	
4	Gedania Gdańsk	38	21	8	9	81	38	+43	71	
5	Pogoń Lębork	38	20	9	9	92	44	+48	69	
6	Radunia Stężyca	38	17	9	12	56	48	+8	60	
7	Orlęta Reda	38	16	11	11	67	41	+26	59	
8	Lechia II Gdańsk	38	17	7	14	86	59	+27	58	
9	Polonia Gdańsk	38	17	7	14	55	58	−3	58	
10	Olimpia Sztum	38	15	11	12	67	55	+12	56	
11	Wierzyca Starogard Gdański	38	16	7	15	74	71	+3	55	
12	Jantar Ustka	38	16	5	17	72	59	+13	53	
13	Stolem Gniewino	38	14	8	16	65	63	+2	50	
14	Pomezania Malbork	38	13	9	16	57	54	+3	48	
15	Powiśle Dzierzgoń	38	13	7	18	57	69	−12	46	
16	Piast Człuchów	38	12	8	18	63	87	−24	44	Relegated to Liga Okręgowa
17	Orkan Rumia	38	12	7	19	62	64	−2	43	Relegated to Liga Okręgowa
18	Żuławy Nowy Dwór Gdański	38	7	7	24	46	102	−56	28	Relegated to Liga Okręgowa
19	Chrobry Charbrowo	38	4	6	28	39	149	−110	18	Relegated to Liga Okręgowa
20	Orzeł Choczewo	38	1	4	33	19	189	−170	7	Relegated to Liga Okręgowa

Updated to match(es) played on unknown. Source:

== Season 2001-02 ==
Pos	Team	Pld	W	D	L	GF	GA	GD	Pts	Qualification or relegation
1	Unia Tczew	32	21	7	4	69	25	+44	70	Promoted to III liga
2	Cartusia Kartuzy	32	21	6	5	64	26	+38	69	
3	Pomezania Malbork	32	14	13	5	42	24	+18	55	
4	Bałtyk Gdynia	32	15	5	12	68	52	+16	50	
5	Pogoń Lębork	32	14	8	10	47	39	+8	50	
6	Wisła Tczew	32	14	6	12	57	43	+14	48	
7	Kaszuby Połchowo	32	14	6	12	55	47	+8	48	
8	Olimpia Sztum	32	13	7	12	54	45	+9	46	
9	Stolem Gniewino	32	12	10	10	35	37	−2	46	
10	Orlęta Reda	32	13	4	15	53	49	+4	43	
11	Gryf 95 Słupsk	32	12	7	13	55	62	−7	43	
12	Wierzyca Starogard Gdański	32	12	6	14	54	62	−8	42	Relegation Play-offs
13	Jantar Ustka	32	11	6	15	44	58	−14	39	Relegation Play-offs
14	Radunia Stężyca	32	11	5	16	48	58	−10	38	Relegation Play-offs
15	Powiśle Dzierzgoń	32	9	9	14	44	52	−8	36	Relegated to Liga Okręgowa
16	Gedania Gdańsk	32	8	7	17	31	54	−23	31	Relegated to Liga Okręgowa
17	Polonia Gdańsk	32	0	4	28	16	103	−87	4	Relegated to Liga Okręgowa
18	Lechia/Polonia Gdańsk	0	0	0	0	0	0	0	0	Withdrew and disbanded

Updated to match(es) played on unknown. Source:

=== Relegation play-offs ===
Team 1	Agg.	Team 2	1st leg	2nd leg
Wierzyca Pelplin	1-12	Wierzyca Starogard Gdański	1-6	0-6
KP Sopot	7-0	Radunia Stężyca	3-0	4-0
Start Miastko	3-5	Jantar Ustka	1-1	2-4

== Season 2002-03 ==
Pos	Team	Pld	W	D	L	GF	GA	GD	Pts	Qualification or relegation
1	Kaszubia Kościerzyna	34	27	5	2	76	24	+52	86	Promoted to III liga
2	Flotylla Gdańsk	34	19	11	4	69	24	+45	68	
3	Pomezania Malbork	34	16	8	10	64	39	+25	56	
4	Cartusia Kartuzy	34	14	12	8	49	38	+11	54	
5	Wierzyca Starogard Gdański	34	15	6	13	58	48	+10	51	
6	Olimpia Sztum	34	14	8	12	58	49	+9	50	
7	Orlęta Reda	34	12	13	9	41	34	+7	49	
8	KP Sopot	34	13	7	14	40	45	−5	46	
9	Bałtyk Gdynia	34	11	11	12	46	47	−1	44	
10	Chojniczanka Chojnice	34	12	8	14	52	56	−4	44	
11	Gryf 95 Słupsk	34	12	8	14	41	56	−15	44	
12	Kaszuby Połchowo	34	12	7	15	50	66	−16	43	
13	Pogoń Lębork	34	11	9	14	48	62	−14	42	
14	Wisła Tczew	34	11	8	15	56	53	+3	41	Relegation Play-offs
15	Jantar Ustka	34	9	11	14	48	58	−10	38	Relegation Play-offs
16	Rodło Kwidzyn	34	10	7	17	39	53	−14	37	Relegation Play-offs
17	Stolem Gniewino	34	6	11	17	39	69	−30	29	Relegated to Liga Okręgowa
18	Piast Człuchów	34	5	4	25	48	101	−53	19	Relegated to Liga Okręgowa

Updated to match(es) played on unknown. Source:

=== Relegation play-offs ===
Team 1	Agg.	Team 2	1st leg	2nd leg
Wisła Tczew	10-6	Radunia Stężyca	7-3	3-3
Sparta Sycewice	6-3	Jantar Ustka	2-0	4-3
Rodło Kwidzyn	3-5	Powiśle Dzierzgoń	1-1	2-4

== Season 2003-04 ==
Pos	Team	Pld	W	D	L	GF	GA	GD	Pts	Qualification or relegation
1	Lechia Gdańsk	34	27	4	3	102	29	+73	85	Promoted to III liga
2	Gedania Gdańsk	34	25	6	3	101	27	+74	81	
3	Olimpia Sztum	34	20	9	5	67	30	+37	69	
4	Orlęta Reda	34	20	5	9	68	37	+31	65	
5	Orkan Rumia	33	16	5	12	57	42	+15	53	
6	Cartusia Kartuzy	34	14	9	11	46	40	+6	51	
7	Kaszuby Połchowo	34	14	5	15	56	53	+3	47	
8	KP Sopot	34	13	7	14	49	57	−8	46	
9	Powiśle Dzierzgoń	34	14	4	16	36	50	−14	46	
10	Wierzyca Starogard Gdański	34	13	7	14	48	67	−19	46	
11	Gryf 95 Słupsk	34	14	3	17	43	54	−11	45	
12	Wisła Tczew	34	13	5	16	38	49	−11	44	
13	Bałtyk Gdynia	34	11	10	13	46	39	+7	43	Relegation Play-offs
14	Chojniczanka Chojnice	34	13	4	17	52	61	−9	43	Relegation Play-offs
15	Pomezania Malbork	34	11	9	14	42	56	−14	42	Relegation Play-offs
16	Pogoń Lębork	34	6	10	18	46	57	−11	28	Relegated to Liga Okręgowa
17	Sparta Sycewice	33	4	2	27	46	110	−64	14	Relegated to Liga Okręgowa
18	Wybrzeże Objazda	34	4	2	28	26	111	−85	14	Relegated to Liga Okręgowa

Updated to match(es) played on unknown. Source:

=== Relegation play-offs ===
Team 1	Agg.	Team 2	1st leg	2nd leg
Arka II Gdynia	2-3	Pomezania Malbork	2-2	0-1
Brda Przechlewo	1-5	Chojniczanka Chojnice	1-1	0-4
Wierzyca Pelplin	0-4	Bałtyk Gdynia	0-1	0-3

== Season 2004-05 ==
Pos	Team	Pld	W	D	L	GF	GA	GD	Pts	Qualification or relegation
1	Cartusia Kartuzy	34	30	2	2	108	28	+80	92	Promoted to III liga
2	Bałtyk Gdynia	34	18	7	9	54	41	+13	61	
3	Kaszuby Połchowo	34	18	5	11	57	42	+15	59	
4	Wierzyca Starogard Gdański	34	15	11	8	62	49	+13	56	
5	Powiśle Dzierzgoń	34	16	8	10	59	52	+7	56	
6	Olimpia Sztum	34	15	7	12	53	41	+12	52	
7	Rodło Kwidzyn	34	15	6	13	65	59	+6	51	
8	Arka II Gdynia	34	13	11	10	52	42	+10	50	
9	Orkan Rumia	34	13	11	10	52	42	+10	50	
10	Orlęta Reda	34	13	10	11	52	35	+17	49	
11	Wisła Tczew	34	13	6	15	54	58	−4	45	
12	Gryf 95 Słupsk	34	13	6	15	54	64	−10	45	
13	Jantar Ustka	34	10	11	13	42	54	−12	41	Relegation Play-offs
14	Pomezania Malbork	34	9	11	14	49	60	−11	38	Relegation Play-offs
15	Gryf Wejherowo	34	9	5	20	27	60	−33	32	Relegation Play-offs
16	KP Sopot	34	9	4	21	36	69	−33	31	Relegated to Liga Okręgowa
17	Chojniczanka Chojnice	34	8	1	25	33	66	−33	25	Relegated to Liga Okręgowa
18	Gedania Gdańsk	34	5	4	25	27	80	−53	19	Relegated to Liga Okręgowa

Updated to match(es) played on unknown. Source:

=== Relegation play-offs ===
Team 1	Agg.	Team 2	1st leg	2nd leg
Wierzyca Pelplin	3-2	Gryf Wejherowo	1-2	3-2
Czarni Czarne	3-2(a)	Jantar Ustka	1-1	0-0
Polonia Gdańsk	2-2 pen.4-3	Pomezania Malbork	1-0	2-1 a.e.t.

== Season 2005-06 ==
Pos	Team	Pld	W	D	L	GF	GA	GD	Pts	Qualification or relegation
1	Rodło Kwidzyn	34	24	6	4	83	42	+41	78	Promoted to III liga
2	Wierzyca Starogard Gdański	34	19	7	8	79	47	+32	64	
3	Wierzyca Pelplin	34	20	4	10	81	56	+25	64	
4	Bytovia Bytów	34	19	6	9	60	38	+22	63	
5	Powiśle Dzierzgoń	34	18	4	12	70	46	+24	58	
6	Start Mrzezino	34	15	12	7	59	35	+24	57	
7	Bałtyk Gdynia	34	16	6	12	62	49	+13	54	
8	Czarni Pruszcz Gdański	34	16	4	14	70	58	+12	52	Qualified to 2006-07 Polish Cup
9	Orkan Rumia	34	14	6	14	57	52	+5	48	
10	Orlęta Reda	34	13	9	12	46	43	+3	48	
11	Arka II Gdynia	34	11	10	13	60	48	+12	43	
12	Kaszuby Połchowo	34	11	10	13	46	47	−1	43	
13	Jantar Ustka	34	12	7	15	40	51	−11	43	
14	Unia Tczew	34	11	7	16	40	71	−31	40	Relegation Play-offs
15	Olimpia Sztum	34	11	4	19	48	76	−28	37	Relegation Play-offs
16	Wisła Tczew	34	6	8	20	37	81	−44	26	Relegation Play-offs
17	Gryf 95 Słupsk	34	4	10	20	38	80	−42	22	Relegated to Liga Okręgowa
18	Pomezania Malbork	34	3	6	25	37	93	−56	15	Relegated to Liga Okręgowa

Updated to match(es) played on unknown. Source:

=== Relegation play-offs ===
Team 1	Agg.	Team 2	1st leg	2nd leg
Czarni Czarne	4-4 (a)	Wisła Tczew	1-2	3-2
Huragan Przodkowo	3-2	Unia Tczew	2-1	1-1
Radunia Stężyca	2-3	Olimpia Sztum	0-2	2-1 a.e.t.

== Season 2006-07 ==
Pos	Team	Pld	W	D	L	GF	GA	GD	Pts	Qualification or relegation
1	Wierzyca Pelplin	34	26	3	5	110	44	+66	81	Promoted to III liga
2	Orkan Rumia	34	21	6	7	71	32	+39	69	
3	Bałtyk Gdynia	34	19	10	5	81	45	+36	67	
4	Bytovia Bytów	34	18	7	9	53	35	+18	61	
5	GKS Luzino	34	18	3	13	64	47	+17	57	
6	Orlęta Reda	34	17	5	12	58	43	+15	56	
7	Arka II Gdynia	34	16	6	12	58	51	+7	54	
8	Powiśle Dzierzgoń	34	16	5	13	42	44	−2	53	
9	Orzeł Trąbki Wielkie	34	14	10	10	54	41	+13	52	
10	Murkam Przodkowo	34	13	10	11	43	35	+8	49	
11	Brda Przechlewo	34	14	6	14	51	60	−9	48	
12	Gryf Wejherowo	34	11	7	16	31	53	−22	40	
13	Czarni Pruszcz Gdański	34	10	8	16	52	75	−23	38	
14	Olimpia Sztum	34	11	5	18	42	47	−5	38	Relegation Play-offs
15	Start Mrzezino	34	10	6	18	46	55	−9	36	Relegation Play-offs
16	Czarni Czarne	34	6	7	21	32	79	−47	25	Relegation Play-offs
17	Wierzyca Starogard Gdański	34	5	6	23	45	79	−34	21	Relegated to Liga Okręgowa
18	Jantar Ustka	34	4	4	26	21	89	−68	16	Relegated to Liga Okręgowa

Updated to match(es) played on unknown. Source:

=== Relegation play-offs ===
Team 1	Agg.	Team 2	1st leg	2nd leg
Polonez Bobrowniki	3-1	Start Mrzezino	3-1	0-0
GTS Kolbudy	1-10	Olimpia Sztum	0-4	1-6
Pomezania Malbork	0-2	Czarni Czarne	0-1	0-1

== Season 2007-08 ==
2007-08 was the last season with IV liga as fourth level. In the following season IV liga became fifth level, due to creation of Ekstraklasa.

Pos	Team	Pld	W	D	L	GF	GA	GD	Pts	Qualification or relegation
1	Zatoka Puck	34	22	9	3	80	24	+56	75	Play-offs for new II liga
2	Bałtyk Gdynia	34	23	6	5	72	33	+39	75	Promoted to new III liga
3	Orkan Rumia	34	19	8	7	69	38	+31	65	Promoted to new III liga
4	Gryf 95 Słupsk	34	19	3	12	58	38	+20	60	Promoted to new III liga
5	Bytovia Bytów	34	17	9	8	50	31	+19	60	Promoted to new III liga and Qualified to 2008-09 Polish Cup
6	Olimpia Sztum	34	16	8	10	48	37	+11	56	Promoted to new III liga
7	Orlęta Reda	34	15	10	9	34	25	+9	55	Play-offs for new III liga
8	Gryf Wejherowo	34	16	5	13	42	35	+7	53	
9	Lechia II Gdańsk	34	15	7	12	61	42	+19	52	
10	Orzeł Trąbki Wielkie	34	12	13	9	46	35	+11	49	
11	Powiśle Dzierzgoń	34	13	7	14	45	47	−2	46	
12	Brda Przechlewo	34	12	6	16	53	67	−14	42	
13	Unia Tczew	34	10	6	18	38	54	−16	36	
14	Murkam Przodkowo	34	8	8	18	34	53	−19	32	
15	Arka II Gdynia	34	8	6	20	34	56	−22	30	
16	Czarni Pruszcz Gdański	34	7	4	23	28	74	−46	25	
17	Polonez Bobrowniki	34	6	7	21	29	76	−47	25	
18	Czarni Czarne	34	5	4	25	19	75	−56	19	Relegation Play-offs

Updated to match(es) played on unknown. Source:

=== Relegation play-offs ===
==== Semifinals ====
Team 1	Score	Team 2
Gedania Gdańsk	5-1	Czarni Czarne
Wisła Tczew	5-4 a.e.t.	Pomorze Potęgowo

==== Final ====
Team 1	Score	Team 2
Gedania Gdańsk	0-1	Wisła Tczew

== Season 2008-09 ==
2008-09 was the first season with IV liga as fifth level.

Pos	Team	Pld	W	D	L	GF	GA	GD	Pts	Qualification or relegation
1	Chojniczanka Chojnice	30	24	3	3	86	27	+59	75	Promoted to III liga
2	Gryf Wejherowo	30	21	6	3	76	32	+44	69	Promoted to III liga
3	Lechia II Gdańsk	30	17	5	8	56	41	+15	56	
4	Orzeł Trąbki Wielkie	30	16	6	8	45	32	+13	54	
5	Murkam Przodkowo	30	14	10	6	46	25	+21	52	
6	Powiśle Dzierzgoń	30	13	6	11	41	39	+2	45	
7	Pomezania Malbork	30	11	10	9	44	29	+15	43	
8	GTS Kolbudy	30	11	8	11	36	38	−2	41	Penally relegated to Liga Okręgowa
9	Wisła Tczew	30	13	1	16	43	47	−4	40	
10	Start Mrzezino	30	12	3	15	35	40	−5	39	Withdrew after season and relegated to Liga Okręgowa
11	Czarni Pruszcz Gdański	30	12	1	17	43	63	−20	37	Relegation Play-offs
12	Pogoń Lębork	30	10	5	15	33	48	−15	35	Relegation Play-offs
13	Koral Dębnica	30	7	8	15	41	65	−24	29	Relegation Play-offs
14	Polonez Bobrowniki	30	7	4	19	35	68	−33	25	Relegated to Liga Okręgowa
15	TKP Tczew	30	6	6	18	33	61	−28	24	Relegated to Liga Okręgowa
16	Brda Przechlewo	30	2	6	22	26	64	−38	12	Relegated to Liga Okręgowa

Updated to match(es) played on unknown. Source:

=== Relegation play-offs ===
Team 1	Agg.	Team 2	1st leg	2nd leg
Żuławy Nowy Dwór Gdański	3-0	Pogoń Lębork	3-0	0-0
Polonia Gdańsk	3-4	Koral Dębnica	3-2	0-2
Czarni Czarne	3-1	Czarni Pruszcz Gdański	2-1	1-0

== Season 2009-10 ==
Pos	Team	Pld	W	D	L	GF	GA	GD	Pts	Qualification or relegation
1	Lechia II Gdańsk	30	17	9	4	63	19	+44	60	Promoted to III liga
2	Orlęta Reda	30	18	6	6	58	31	+27	60	Promoted to III liga
3	Gryf 2009 Tczew	30	18	4	8	61	41	+20	58	
4	Wierzyca Pelplin	30	15	5	10	78	56	+22	50	
5	Pomezania Malbork	30	12	12	6	43	30	+13	48	
6	Huragan Przodkowo	30	12	11	7	47	30	+17	47	
7	Pomorze Potęgowo	30	13	5	12	55	48	+7	44	
8	Olimpia Sztum	30	11	10	9	35	39	−4	43	
9	Powiśle Dzierzgoń	30	10	12	8	45	41	+4	42	
10	Wietcisa Skarszewy	30	11	4	15	39	58	−19	37	
11	Koral Dębnica	30	10	7	13	43	61	−18	37	
12	Żuławy Nowy Dwór Gdański	30	11	4	15	32	44	−12	37	
13	Czarni Czarne	30	8	6	16	35	40	−5	30	Relegated to Liga Okręgowa
14	Orzeł Trąbki Wielkie	30	7	6	17	32	60	−28	27	Relegated to Liga Okręgowa
15	Rodło Kwidzyn	30	7	4	19	28	48	−20	25	Relegated to Liga Okręgowa
16	Czarni Pruszcz Gdański	30	5	5	20	34	82	−48	20	Relegated to Liga Okręgowa

Updated to match(es) played on unknown. Source:

== Season 2010-11 ==
Pos	Team	Pld	W	D	L	GF	GA	GD	Pts	Qualification or relegation
1	Gryf 2009 Tczew	30	22	2	6	90	33	+57	68	Promoted to III liga
2	Koral Dębnica	30	17	5	8	73	36	+37	56	Promoted to III liga
3	Pomorze Potęgowo	30	16	7	7	46	28	+18	55	
4	Jantar Ustka	30	16	6	8	61	36	+25	54	
5	Huragan Przodkowo	30	14	9	7	55	32	+23	51	
6	Powiśle Dzierzgoń	30	12	10	8	48	39	+9	46	
7	Pomezania Malbork	30	13	7	10	40	30	+10	46	
8	Wietcisa Skarszewy	30	12	7	11	42	57	−15	43	
9	Wierzyca Pelplin	30	12	6	12	64	57	+7	42	
10	Olimpia Sztum	30	11	8	11	37	41	−4	41	
11	Żuławy Nowy Dwór Gdański	30	12	5	13	38	51	−13	41	Relegated to Liga Okręgowa
12	Grom Kleszczewo	30	12	4	14	40	47	−7	40	Relegated to Liga Okręgowa
13	GKS Kolbudy	30	10	7	13	50	57	−7	37	Relegated to Liga Okręgowa
14	GKS Pęplino	30	5	9	16	30	67	−37	24	Relegated to Liga Okręgowa
15	Start Mrzezino	30	4	4	22	24	68	−44	16	Relegated to Liga Okręgowa
16	Pogoń Prabuty	30	2	4	24	18	77	−59	10	Relegated to Liga Okręgowa

Updated to match(es) played on unknown. Source:

== Season 2011-12 ==
Pos	Team	Pld	W	D	L	GF	GA	GD	Pts	Qualification or relegation
1	Arka II Gdynia	30	22	5	3	89	22	+67	71	Promoted to III liga
2	Polonia Gdańsk	30	19	3	8	59	29	+30	60	Promoted to III liga
3	Orlęta Reda	30	16	5	9	58	32	+26	53	
4	Wietcisa Skarszewy	30	17	2	11	55	43	+12	53	
5	Powiśle Dzierzgoń	30	15	7	8	48	40	+8	52	
6	GTS Pszczółki	30	15	6	9	56	46	+10	51	
7	Pomorze Potęgowo	30	14	7	9	50	40	+10	49	
8	Wierzyca Pelplin	30	13	5	12	46	45	+1	44	
9	Pomezania Malbork	30	11	5	14	52	61	−9	38	
10	Huragan Przodkowo	30	11	3	16	43	49	−6	36	
11	Chojniczanka II/Jantar Pawłowo	30	10	5	15	50	60	−10	35	
12	Czarni Czarne	30	10	4	16	40	60	−20	34	
13	Pogoń Lębork	30	7	12	11	36	41	−5	33	Relegated to Liga Okręgowa
14	Olimpia Sztum	30	9	5	16	27	62	−35	32	Relegated to Liga Okręgowa
15	KP Starogard Gdański	30	9	1	20	39	68	−29	28	Relegated to Liga Okręgowa
16	Jantar Ustka	30	2	5	23	26	76	−50	11	Relegated to Liga Okręgowa

Updated to match(es) played on unknown. Source:

== Season 2012-13 ==
Pos	Team	Pld	W	D	L	GF	GA	GD	Pts	Qualification or relegation
1	Kaszubia Kościerzyna	34	28	4	2	84	17	+67	88	Promoted to III liga
2	Pomorze Potęgowo	34	26	2	6	106	33	+73	80	Promoted to III liga
3	Huragan Przodkowo	34	20	3	11	65	34	+31	63	
4	KS Chwaszczyno	34	18	8	8	73	37	+36	62	
5	Orlęta Reda	34	17	7	10	63	43	+20	58	
6	GKS Kolbudy	34	16	6	12	76	55	+21	54	
7	Anioły Garczegorze	34	14	11	9	50	40	+10	53	
8	Powiśle Dzierzgoń	34	15	6	13	54	48	+6	51	
9	Wietcisa Skarszewy	34	15	3	16	67	72	−5	48	
10	Wierzyca Pelplin	34	14	6	14	53	53	0	48	
11	Bytovia II Bytów	34	14	5	15	45	45	0	47	
12	Gryf 2009 Tczew	34	13	8	13	45	54	−9	47	
13	Pomezania Malbork	34	12	7	15	58	69	−11	43	
14	GTS Pszczółki	34	10	6	18	50	78	−28	36	Relegated to Liga Okręgowa
15	Czarni Czarne	34	6	9	19	44	79	−35	27	Relegated to Liga Okręgowa
16	Chojniczanka II/Jantar Pawłowo	34	7	1	26	39	87	−48	22	Relegated to Liga Okręgowa
17	Rodło Kwidzyn	34	6	4	24	46	100	−54	22	Relegated to Liga Okręgowa
18	Czarni Przemysław	34	5	4	25	53	127	−74	19	Relegated to Liga Okręgowa

Updated to match(es) played on unknown. Source:

== Season 2013-14 ==
Pos	Team	Pld	W	D	L	GF	GA	GD	Pts	Qualification or relegation
1	GKS Przodkowo	34	24	6	4	99	27	+72	78	Promoted to III liga
2	KS Chwaszczyno	34	22	9	3	71	32	+39	75	Promoted to III liga
3	GOSRiT Luzino	34	22	4	8	79	39	+40	70	
4	Gryf Słupsk	34	20	5	9	100	43	+57	65	
5	Powiśle Dzierzgoń	34	16	10	8	63	46	+17	58	
6	GKS Kolbudy	34	17	6	11	75	58	+17	57	
7	Wierzyca Pelplin	34	18	2	14	74	53	+21	56	
8	Anioły Garczegorze	34	15	10	9	46	35	+11	55	
9	Olimpia Sztum	34	16	6	12	43	47	−4	54	
10	Pogoń Lębork	34	15	5	14	76	57	+19	50	
11	Bytovia II Bytów	34	14	6	14	81	62	+19	48	
12	Amator Kiełpino	34	14	5	15	58	59	−1	47	
13	Pomezania Malbork	34	11	3	20	58	66	−8	36	Relegated to Liga Okręgowa
14	Orlęta Reda	34	11	3	20	50	71	−21	36	Relegated to Liga Okręgowa
15	Gryf 2009 Tczew	34	10	3	21	43	85	−42	33	Relegated to Liga Okręgowa
16	Żuławy Nowy Dwór Gdański	34	9	4	21	47	75	−28	31	Relegated to Liga Okręgowa
17	Piast Człuchów	34	3	4	27	45	133	−88	13	Relegated to Liga Okręgowa
18	Wietcisa Skarszewy	34	3	1	30	22	142	−120	10	Relegated to Liga Okręgowa

Updated to match(es) played on unknown. Source:

== Season 2014-15 ==
Pos	Team	Pld	W	D	L	GF	GA	GD	Pts	Qualification or relegation
1	Gryf Słupsk	34	24	7	3	115	32	+83	79	Promoted to III liga
2	Wierzyca Pelplin	34	24	4	6	78	35	+43	76	Promoted to III liga
3	KP Starogard Gdański	34	20	8	6	80	39	+41	68	
4	Anioły Garczegorze	34	19	6	9	62	25	+37	63	
5	Jaguar Gdańsk	34	19	5	10	68	45	+23	62	
6	Jantar Ustka	34	17	6	11	59	47	+12	57	
7	Pogoń Lębork	34	16	7	11	59	44	+15	55	
8	Centrum Pelplin	34	16	7	11	70	52	+18	55	
9	Powiśle Dzierzgoń	34	15	9	10	65	46	+19	54	
10	Bytovia II Bytów	34	17	1	16	67	65	+2	52	
11	GKS Kolbudy	34	15	4	15	79	53	+26	49	
12	MKS Władysławowo	34	14	5	15	54	60	−6	47	
13	KTS-K Luzino	34	12	6	16	44	59	−15	42	
14	Start Miastko	34	11	8	15	51	80	−29	41	
15	Polonia Gdańsk	34	7	7	20	47	59	−12	28	Relegated to Liga Okręgowa
16	Amator Kiełpino	34	3	0	31	25	163	−138	9	Relegated to Liga Okręgowa
17	Koral Dębnica	34	5	4	25	30	84	−54	19	Withdrew and disbanded
18	Olimpia Sztum	34	3	2	29	16	87	−71	11	Withdrew and relegated to Klasa A

Updated to match(es) played on unknown. Source:

== Season 2015-16 ==
Pos	Team	Pld	W	D	L	GF	GA	GD	Pts	Qualification or relegation
1	Pogoń Lębork	34	24	6	4	75	26	+49	78	Promoted to III liga and Qualified to 2016-17 Polish Cup
2	Rodło Kwidzyn	34	23	8	3	82	18	+64	77	
3	KP Starogard Gdański	34	20	6	8	92	35	+57	66	
4	GKS Kolbudy	34	19	4	11	71	35	+36	61	
5	Bytovia II Bytów	34	19	3	12	73	49	+24	60	
6	Powiśle Dzierzgoń	34	17	7	10	53	44	+9	58	
7	Gedania Gdańsk	34	17	6	11	68	43	+25	57	
8	Anioły Garczegorze	34	15	6	13	54	42	+12	51	
9	Stolem Gniewino	34	14	9	11	55	41	+14	51	
10	Jaguar Gdańsk	34	12	11	11	49	48	+1	47	
11	Centrum Pelplin	34	14	5	15	48	51	−3	47	
12	KTS-K Luzino	34	12	8	14	52	43	+9	44	Relegated to Liga Okręgowa
13	Brda Przechlewo	34	12	7	15	51	74	−23	43	Relegated to Liga Okręgowa
14	MKS Władysławowo	34	12	2	20	54	81	−27	38	Relegated to Liga Okręgowa
15	Start Miastko	34	8	10	16	42	63	−21	34	Relegated to Liga Okręgowa
16	Jantar Ustka	34	8	5	21	50	107	−57	29	Relegated to Liga Okręgowa
17	Gryf 2009 Tczew	34	6	2	26	37	106	−69	20	Relegated to Liga Okręgowa
18	Zawisza Borzytuchom	34	1	1	32	21	121	−100	4	Withdrew and relegated to Klasa A

Updated to match(es) played on unknown. Source:

== Season 2016-17 ==
Pos	Team	Pld	W	D	L	GF	GA	GD	Pts	Qualification or relegation
1	Wierzyca Pelplin	34	27	3	4	97	33	+64	84	Promoted to III liga
2	KP Starogard Gdański	34	20	6	8	73	40	+33	66	Withdrew due to fusion with KS Chwaszczyno, moved to III liga
3	Centrum Pelplin	34	19	8	7	63	37	+26	65	Withdrew after season and relegated to Klasa B
4	Powiśle Dzierzgoń	34	18	8	8	55	42	+13	62	
5	Grom Nowy Staw	34	19	4	11	69	51	+18	61	
6	Arka II Gdynia	34	19	3	12	85	41	+44	60	
7	Kaszubia Kościerzyna	34	17	4	13	68	59	+9	55	
8	Gryf Słupsk	34	15	5	14	63	48	+15	50	Qualified to 2017-18 Polish Cup
9	Jaguar Gdańsk	34	14	8	12	62	56	+6	50	
10	Stolem Gniewino	34	12	9	13	41	45	−4	45	
11	GKS Kolbudy	34	12	8	14	60	55	+5	44	
12	Orkan Rumia	34	12	8	14	48	64	−16	44	
13	Gedania Gdańsk	34	11	5	18	50	65	−15	38	
14	Cartusia Kartuzy	34	9	10	15	45	64	−19	37	
15	Anioły Garczegorze	34	9	7	18	48	66	−18	34	
16	Bytovia II Bytów	34	9	7	18	39	68	−29	34	
17	Sokół Wyczechy	34	6	3	25	46	107	−61	21	
18	Rodło Kwidzyn	34	3	4	27	8	79	−71	13	Withdrew and relegated to Liga Okręgowa

Updated to match(es) played on unknown. Source:

== Season 2017-18 ==
Pos	Team	Pld	W	D	L	GF	GA	GD	Pts	Qualification or relegation
1	Radunia Stężyca	34	31	1	2	120	18	+102	94	Promoted to III liga
2	Grom Nowy Staw	34	25	2	7	103	45	+58	77	
3	Gryf Słupsk	34	20	7	7	81	43	+38	67	
4	Kaszubia Kościerzyna	34	15	8	11	66	53	+13	53	
5	Anioły Garczegorze	34	14	9	11	67	53	+14	51	
6	Stolem Gniewino	34	14	9	11	71	58	+13	51	
7	Arka II Gdynia	34	14	7	13	62	55	+7	49	
8	Jaguar Gdańsk	34	13	9	12	60	58	+2	48	
9	KTS-K Luzino	34	14	6	14	45	53	−8	48	
10	Pogoń Lębork	34	14	5	15	46	64	−18	47	
11	Bytovia II Bytów	34	11	8	15	42	49	−7	41	
12	GKS Kolbudy	34	10	11	13	55	49	+6	41	
13	Powiśle Dzierzgoń	34	11	7	16	50	64	−14	40	
14	Orkan Rumia	34	11	6	17	55	66	−11	39	
15	Gedania Gdańsk	34	11	6	17	69	73	−4	39	
16	Start Miastko	34	9	9	16	54	80	−26	36	Relegated to Liga Okręgowa
17	Cartusia Kartuzy	34	9	8	17	67	77	−10	35	Relegated to Liga Okręgowa
18	Sokół Wyczechy	34	1	0	33	25	180	−155	3	Relegated to Liga Okręgowa

Updated to match(es) played on unknown. Source:

== Season 2018-19 ==
Pos	Team	Pld	W	D	L	GF	GA	GD	Pts	Qualification or relegation
1	Grom Nowy Staw	36	24	7	5	106	45	+61	79	Promoted to III liga
2	Gryf Słupsk	36	24	4	8	85	44	+41	76	Qualified to 2019-20 Polish Cup
3	GKS Przodkowo	36	21	8	7	72	34	+38	71	
4	Stolem Gniewino	36	20	10	6	96	52	+44	70	
5	Lechia II Gdańsk	36	20	7	9	81	44	+37	67	
6	Arka II Gdynia	36	19	10	7	103	54	+49	67	
7	Powiśle Dzierzgoń	36	16	7	13	70	61	+9	55	
8	Kaszubia Kościerzyna	36	17	3	16	65	65	0	54	
9	Jantar Ustka	36	14	7	15	61	90	−29	49	
10	KTS-K Luzino	36	13	10	13	58	64	−6	49	
11	Gedania Gdańsk	36	14	6	16	52	61	−9	48	
12	Pogoń Lębork	36	12	8	16	51	56	−5	44	
13	GKS Kowale	36	11	9	16	55	63	−8	42	
14	Jaguar Gdańsk	36	12	6	18	55	72	−17	42	
15	Wda Lipusz	36	10	5	21	54	79	−25	35	
16	Anioły Garczegorze	36	8	7	21	33	64	−31	31	Relegated to Liga Okręgowa
17	Bytovia II Bytów	36	6	9	21	38	97	−59	27	Relegated to Liga Okręgowa
18	GKS Kolbudy	36	6	9	21	51	91	−40	27	Relegated to Liga Okręgowa
19	Orkan Rumia	36	6	6	24	39	89	−50	24	Relegated to Liga Okręgowa

Updated to match(es) played on unknown. Source:

== Season 2019-20 ==
Competition could not be completed due to COVID-19 pandemic. The Pomeranian Football Association decided that first place will be promoted to III liga, but there will be no relegations in 2019-20 season in IV liga Pomerania. Despite that, Lipniczanka Lipnica decided to play next season in Liga Okręgowa, one level below IV liga.

Pos	Team	Pld	W	D	L	GF	GA	GD	Pts	Qualification or relegation
1	GKS Przodkowo	18	14	1	3	51	23	+28	43	Promoted to III liga
2	Arka II Gdynia	17	12	3	2	48	22	+26	39	
3	Kaszubia Kościerzyna	18	11	5	2	44	22	+22	38	
4	Stolem Gniewino	18	11	4	3	51	33	+18	37	
5	Gryf Słupsk	18	10	7	1	36	19	+17	37	
6	KTS-K Luzino	18	8	4	6	39	27	+12	28	
7	Pogoń Lębork	18	9	0	9	36	28	+8	27	
8	Lechia II Gdańsk	17	7	5	5	38	20	+18	26	
9	Cartusia Kartuzy	18	7	4	7	31	35	−4	25	
10	Powiśle Dzierzgoń	18	7	4	7	33	40	−7	25	
11	Wierzyca Pelplin	18	7	3	8	37	44	−7	24	
12	Gedania Gdańsk	18	6	4	8	34	36	−2	22	
13	Wda Lipusz	18	6	3	9	34	38	−4	21	
14	Gwiazda Karsin	18	6	1	11	34	48	−14	19	
15	GKS Kowale	18	4	3	11	22	40	−18	15	
16	Jaguar Gdańsk	18	2	5	11	23	50	−27	11	Qualified to 2020-21 Polish Cup
17	Jantar Ustka	18	3	0	15	29	54	−25	9	
18	Lipniczanka Lipnica	18	2	2	14	17	58	−41	8	Decided to relegate themselves to Liga Okręgowa

Updated to match(es) played on unknown. Source:

=== Play-offs for IV liga ===
Pos	Team	Pld	W	D	L	GF	GA	GD	Pts	Qualification or relegation
1	Chojniczanka II Chojnice	2	2	0	0	8	2	+6	6	Promoted to IV liga
2	Sparta Sycewice	2	1	0	1	5	5	0	3	
3	Wietcisa Skarszewy	2	0	0	2	2	8	−6	0	

Updated to match(es) played on unknown. Source:

== Season 2020-21 ==
=== Regular season ===
Pos	Team	Pld	W	D	L	GF	GA	GD	Pts	Qualification or relegation
1	Stolem Gniewino	20	17	3	0	57	16	+41	54	Advanced to Championship Group
2	Kaszubia Kościerzyna	20	16	4	0	66	15	+51	52	Advanced to Championship Group
3	Jaguar Gdańsk	20	13	3	4	48	21	+27	42	Advanced to Championship Group
4	Anioły Garczegorze	20	11	1	8	38	28	+10	34	Advanced to Championship Group
5	Gedania Gdańsk	20	8	7	5	39	34	+5	31	Advanced to Championship Group
6	Pogoń Lębork	20	8	6	6	25	35	−10	30	Advanced to Championship Group
7	GKS Kowale	20	7	8	5	33	38	−5	29	Advanced to Championship Group
8	Gryf Słupsk	20	8	4	8	42	29	+13	28	Advanced to Championship Group
9	Wierzyca Pelplin	20	7	6	7	29	39	−10	27	Advanced to Championship Group
10	Chojniczanka II Chojnice	20	7	5	8	43	29	+14	26	Advanced to Championship Group
11	Lechia II Gdańsk	20	7	5	8	46	35	+11	26	Advanced to Relegation Group
12	Cartusia Kartuzy	20	6	5	9	26	37	−11	23	Advanced to Relegation Group
13	Grom Nowy Staw	20	6	5	9	21	36	−15	23	Advanced to Relegation Group
14	Gwiazda Karsin	20	6	5	9	37	47	−10	23	Advanced to Relegation Group
15	MKS Władysławowo	20	6	4	10	22	39	−17	22	Advanced to Relegation Group
16	KTS-K Luzino	20	4	10	6	23	33	−10	22	Advanced to Relegation Group
17	Arka II Gdynia	20	5	6	9	33	40	−7	21	Advanced to Relegation Group
18	Wda Lipusz	20	5	4	11	19	33	−14	19	Advanced to Relegation Group
19	Jantar Ustka	20	4	6	10	33	48	−15	18	Advanced to Relegation Group
20	Powiśle Dzierzgoń	20	5	3	12	31	44	−13	18	Advanced to Relegation Group
21	Sokół Zblewo	20	3	2	15	27	62	−35	11	Advanced to Relegation Group

Updated to match(es) played on unknown. Source:

=== Championship Group ===
Pos	Team	Pld	W	D	L	GF	GA	GD	Pts	Qualification or relegation
1	Stolem Gniewino	29	22	6	1	74	26	+48	72	Promoted to III liga
2	Kaszubia Kościerzyna	29	21	7	1	85	26	+59	70	
3	Jaguar Gdańsk	29	21	3	5	74	28	+46	66	
4	Gedania Gdańsk	29	13	8	8	64	50	+14	47	
5	Chojniczanka II Chojnice	29	11	8	10	64	39	+25	41	
6	Pogoń Lębork	29	10	9	10	39	59	−20	39	
7	Wierzyca Pelplin	29	10	8	11	45	58	−13	38	
8	Anioły Garczegorze	29	11	2	16	48	55	−7	35	
9	Gryf Słupsk	29	9	7	13	55	51	+4	34	
10	GKS Kowale	29	8	9	12	44	64	−20	33	

Updated to match(es) played on unknown. Source:

=== Relegation Group ===
Pos	Team	Pld	W	D	L	GF	GA	GD	Pts	
1	Wda Lipusz	29	12	4	13	37	40	−3	40	Withdrew after season and relegated to Klasa A
2	Lechia II Gdańsk	29	11	6	12	65	55	+10	39	
3	Grom Nowy Staw	29	10	9	10	34	48	−14	39	
4	Arka II Gdynia	29	10	7	12	57	48	+9	37	
5	Jantar Ustka	29	10	7	12	47	54	−7	37	
6	Wikęd Luzino	29	8	12	9	38	46	−8	36	
7	MKS Władysławowo	29	9	6	14	43	63	−20	33	
8	Powiśle Dzierzgoń	29	9	4	16	46	62	−16	31	Relegated to Liga Okręgowa and Qualified to 2021-22 Polish Cup
9	Cartusia Kartuzy	29	7	6	16	37	58	−21	27	Relegated to Liga Okręgowa
10	Gwiazda Karsin	29	7	6	16	50	75	−25	27	Relegated to Liga Okręgowa
11	Sokół Zblewo	20	3	2	15	27	62	−35	11	Withdrew after regular season, relegated to Klasa A

Updated to match(es) played on unknown. Source:

=== Play-offs for IV liga ===
Pos	Team	Pld	W	D	L	GF	GA	GD	Pts	Qualification or relegation
1	Orkan Rumia	2	1	1	0	7	2	+5	4	Promoted to IV liga
2	Żuławy Nowy Dwór Gdański	2	1	1	0	3	1	+2	4	
3	Lipniczanka Lipnica	2	0	0	2	1	8	−7	0	

Updated to match(es) played on unknown. Source:

== Season 2021-22 ==
=== Regular season ===
Pos	Team	Pld	W	D	L	GF	GA	GD	Pts	
1	Gedania Gdańsk	20	16	3	1	71	20	+51	51	Advanced to Championship Group
2	Jaguar Gdańsk	20	12	7	1	49	25	+24	43	Advanced to Championship Group
3	Lechia II Gdańsk	20	12	2	6	56	31	+25	38	Advanced to Championship Group
4	KTS-K Luzino	20	11	3	6	40	32	+8	36	Advanced to Championship Group
5	Arka II Gdynia	20	10	4	6	42	31	+11	34	Advanced to Championship Group
6	Bytovia Bytów	20	9	7	4	33	27	+6	34	Advanced to Championship Group
7	Gryf Słupsk	20	9	5	6	45	35	+10	32	Advanced to Championship Group
8	Grom Nowy Staw	20	10	2	8	41	31	+10	32	Advanced to Championship Group
9	Gryf Wejherowo	20	10	1	9	36	34	+2	31	Advanced to Championship Group
10	Kaszubia Kościerzyna	20	9	3	8	40	40	0	30	Advanced to Championship Group
11	Wierzyca Pelplin	20	8	3	9	26	31	−5	27	Advanced to Relegation Group
12	Pogoń Lębork	20	8	2	10	35	35	0	26	Advanced to Relegation Group
13	Chojniczanka II Chojnice	20	6	7	7	39	30	+9	25	Advanced to Relegation Group
14	Czarni Pruszcz Gdański	20	6	4	10	30	35	−5	22	Advanced to Relegation Group
15	Anioły Garczegorze	20	5	6	9	20	41	−21	21	Advanced to Relegation Group
16	Borowiak Czersk	20	6	2	12	28	49	−21	20	Advanced to Relegation Group
17	GKS Kowale	20	5	4	11	32	41	−9	19	Advanced to Relegation Group
18	MKS Władysławowo	20	6	1	13	24	57	−33	19	Advanced to Relegation Group
19	Jantar Ustka	20	5	4	11	29	52	−23	19	Advanced to Relegation Group
20	Orkan Rumia	20	5	2	13	28	50	−22	17	Advanced to Relegation Group
21	Sparta Sycewice	20	4	4	12	25	42	−17	16	Advanced to Relegation Group

Updated to match(es) played on unknown. Source:

=== Championship Group ===
Pos	Team	Pld	W	D	L	GF	GA	GD	Pts	Qualification or relegation
1	Gedania Gdańsk	29	23	4	2	92	29	+63	73	Promoted to III liga
2	Jaguar Gdańsk	29	16	8	5	68	40	+28	56	
3	KTS-K Luzino	29	17	4	8	58	37	+21	55	
4	Gryf Wejherowo	29	16	2	11	54	41	+13	50	
5	Lechia II Gdańsk	29	14	3	12	72	56	+16	45	Withdrew after season
6	Kaszubia Kościerzyna	29	14	3	12	55	58	−3	45	Withdrew after season and relegated to Klasa A
7	Gryf Słupsk	29	13	6	10	63	56	+7	45	
8	Bytovia Bytów	29	11	9	9	41	41	0	42	
9	Grom Nowy Staw	29	13	3	13	50	42	+8	42	
10	Arka II Gdynia	29	11	5	13	49	55	−6	38	

Updated to match(es) played on unknown. Source:

=== Relegation Group ===
Pos	Team	Pld	W	D	L	GF	GA	GD	Pts	
1	Chojniczanka II Chojnice	30	11	8	11	66	43	+23	41	
2	Wierzyca Pelplin	30	11	7	12	40	46	−6	40	
3	MKS Władysławowo	30	12	2	16	46	72	−26	38	
4	Pogoń Lębork	30	11	5	14	51	51	0	38	
5	Anioły Garczegorze	30	10	7	13	34	57	−23	37	
6	GKS Kowale	30	10	6	14	57	60	−3	36	
7	Czarni Pruszcz Gdański	30	9	7	14	47	54	−7	34	
8	Sparta Sycewice	30	9	6	15	45	64	−19	33	
9	Borowiak Czersk	30	9	5	16	44	69	−25	32	
10	Jantar Ustka	30	8	5	17	38	71	−33	29	
11	Orkan Rumia	30	7	5	18	47	75	−28	26	Relegated to Liga Okręgowa

Updated to match(es) played on unknown. Source:

== Season 2022-23 ==
Table actual as of 13 December 2022.

Pos	Team	Pld	W	D	L	GF	GA	GD	Pts	
1	KTS-K Luzino	19	16	2	1	61	17	+44	50	Promotion to III liga
2	Chojniczanka II Chojnice	19	13	3	3	41	21	+20	42	
3	Grom Nowy Staw	19	11	6	2	47	11	+36	39	
4	Gryf Wejherowo	19	11	4	4	41	26	+15	37	
5	Pomezania Malbork	19	11	4	4	52	26	+26	37	
6	Anioły Garczegorze	19	11	3	5	52	31	+21	36	
7	Sparta Sycewice	19	11	2	6	36	32	+4	35	
8	Jaguar Gdańsk	19	11	2	6	36	22	+14	35	
9	Czarni Pruszcz Gdański	18	9	2	7	35	28	+7	29	
10	Arka II Gdynia	18	8	3	7	42	37	+5	27	
11	MKS Władysławowo	19	7	5	7	33	43	−10	26	
12	GKS Kowale	18	6	5	7	28	38	−10	23	
13	GKS Kolbudy	18	6	2	10	26	31	−5	20	
14	Pogoń Lębork	19	6	1	12	19	41	−22	19	
15	Powiśle Dzierzgoń	19	4	5	10	27	44	−17	17	Possible relegation to Liga Okręgowa with the current table of III liga
16	Gryf Słupsk	19	5	2	12	26	41	−15	17	Relegation to Liga Okręgowa
17	Borowiak Czersk	19	4	4	11	20	37	−17	16	Relegation to Liga Okręgowa
18	Bytovia Bytów	17	3	4	10	19	36	−17	13	Relegation to Liga Okręgowa
19	Wierzyca Pelplin	19	3	0	16	17	43	−26	9	Relegation to Liga Okręgowa
20	Jantar Ustka	19	1	1	17	15	68	−53	4	Relegation to Liga Okręgowa

Updated to match(es) played on unknown. Source:
