= Jaguar Gdańsk =

Polish sports club

- Full name: Klub Piłkarski Jaguar Gdańsk
- Founded: 15 May 2001; 24 years ago
- Ground: Stadion Miejski
- Chairman: Jacek Jadanowski
- Manager: Piotr Formela
- League: IV liga Pomerania
- 2023–24: IV liga Pomerania, 2nd of 18
- Website: jaguargdansk.pl/
Home colours	Away colours

Jaguar Gdańsk is a sports club based in Gdańsk, Poland. The club was founded in 2001, with the academy being officially registered on 20 September 2017. The club's main sporting section is football, but also serves areas in judo and fishing.

== Football ==
Since the club was formed in 2001 it has often played in the regional divisions in Poland. Jaguar have had a football team in the IV liga (fifth tier) since 2016, with the team finishing mid-table in their first three seasons. While the team currently have a team in the Polish leagues, the club has stated that the main focus for the club is developing the club through the academy. It has been since this focus on its youth academies the club has seen a growth and progression up the leagues. In 2014 the club was added to the "White and Green Future" program organised by Grupa Lotos and has seen the academies teams growing to cater for nearly 500 boys while also expanding and improving their facilities and being able to provide more training sessions for the children in the academy.

=== Seasons ===
Season	League	Tier	Position	Matches	Pts.	W	D	L	GF	GA	GD
2005–06	Klasa B (Gdańsk II)	VIII	14 of 14	26	11	3	2	21	48	120	-72
2006–07	Klasa B (Gdańsk II)	VIII	12 of 14	26	21	7	0	19	45	82	-37
2007–08	Klasa B (Gdańsk II)	VIII	3 of 12	22	47	15	2	5	98	41	+57
2008–09	Klasa B (Gdańsk II)	VIII	1 of 10	18	45	14	3	1	106	28	+78
2009–10	Klasa A (Gdańsk II)	VII	10 of 12	22	21	6	3	13	50	66	-16
2010–11	Klasa B (Gdańsk III)	VIII	1 of 12	22	54	17	3	2	82	20	+62
2011–12	Klasa A (Gdańsk II)	VII	3 of 12	22	41	13	2	7	51	31	+20
2012–13	District League (g. I)	VI	10 of 16	30	40	12	4	14	40	46	-6
2013–14	District League (g. I)	VI	2 of 16	30	64	20	4	6	65	37	+28
2014–15	IV liga (Pomerania)	V	5 of 18	34	62	19	5	10	68	45	+23
2015–16	IV liga (Pomerania)	V	10 of 18	34	47	12	11	11	49	48	+1
2016–17	IV liga (Pomerania)	V	9 of 18	34	50	14	8	12	62	56	+6
2017–18	IV liga (Pomerania)	V	8 of 18	34	48	13	9	12	60	58	+2
2018–19	IV liga (Pomerania)	V	14 of 19	36	42	12	6	18	55	72	-17
2019–20	IV liga (Pomerania)	V	16 of 18	18	11	2	5	11	23	50	-27
2020–21	IV liga (Pomerania)	V	3 of 21	29	69	22	3	4	74	28	+46
2021–22	IV liga (Pomerania)	V	2 of 21	29	56	15	8	5	68	40	+28
2022–23	IV liga (Pomerania)	V	6 of 20	38	60	18	6	14	74	55	+19
2023–24	IV liga (Pomerania)	V	2 of 18	34	82	27	1	6	100	42	+58

=== Polish Cup records ===
Season	Round	Opponent	Result
2020–21	Round of 64	Puszcza Niepołomice	1–4

== Honours ==
- IV liga Pomerania
  - Runners-up: 2021–22, 2023–24
  - Third place: 2020–21
- Regional league Gdańsk I
  - Runners-up: 2013–14
- Klasa A Gdańsk II
  - Third place: 2011–12
- Klasa B Gdańsk II
  - Champions: 2008–09, 2010–11
  - Third place: 2007–08
- Polish Cup (Pomerania regionals)
  - Winners: 2019–20
  - Finalists: 2021–22

== Other sections ==
Alongside football Jaguar has a section for fishing with the club owning a 2.5-hectare (6.2-acre) fishery. The club also has a section for Judo, with Jaguar providing training sessions in 5 different venues around the city of Gdańsk.

== See also ==
- Gdańsk Derby
- Sport in Gdańsk
