= Wierzyca Pelplin =

Polish football club

KS Wierzyca Pelpin
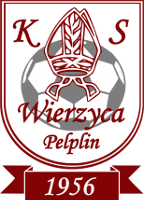
- Full name: Klub Sportowy; Wierzyca Pelpin
- Founded: 1 July 1956; 70 years ago
- Ground: Municipal Stadium
- Capacity: 900 (700 seated)
- Chairman: Jacek Imianowski
- Manager: vacant
- League: IV liga Pomerania
- 2025–26: 9th of 18
- Website: wierzyca.pelplin.pl
Home colours	Away colours

Wierzyca Pelpin is a football club based in Pelpin, Kociewie, Poland. As of the 2025–26 season, the team competes in the Pomerania group of IV liga, after previously finishing top of the Gdańsk II group of the regional league. The club's chairman, Jacek Imianowski, has been dubbed a one-man band by the regional press due to having previously performed nearly all functions at the club, including being a coach, team manager and coaching coordinator.

== Ground ==
Wierzyca plays at the 900 capacity Stadion Miejski w Pelplinie, a municipal stadium located in their home town. In 2018, the first stage of the modernisation of the stadium was completed with the opening of a new football pitch and spectator stand.

== Colours ==
The team play in a red shirt with claret sleeve, shorts and socks. Their away kit is all white with black shorts.

== Rivalries ==
The club have a rivalry with KP Starogard Gdański, against which games are contested as the Kociewian derby.
