= Cartusia Kartuzy =

Polish football club

- Full name: Gminny Klub Sportowy Cartusia 1923 Kartuzy
- Founded: 1923; 103 years ago
- Ground: Municipal Stadium
- Capacity: 1,000
- Chairman: Joanna Szulc
- Manager: Adam Billewicz
- League: IV liga Pomerania
- 2025–26: III liga, group II, 16th of 18 (relegated)
- Website: http://cartusia1923.pl/
Home colours	Away colours

Cartusia Kartuzy is a Polish football club based in Kartuzy. It was founded in 1923, and currently plays in IV liga Pomerania, the fifth level of the Polish football league system after suffering relegation from the 2025–26 III liga.
