= KP Starogard Gdański =

Polish sports club

- KP Starogard Gdański crest
- Full name: Klub Piłkarski Starogard Gdański
- Nickname: Duma Kociewia (The Pride of Kociew)
- Founded: 2008; 18 years ago
- Ground: Stadion Miejski im. Kazimierza Deyny
- Capacity: 3,291
- President: Adam Sobiecki
- Manager: Błażej Mierzejewski
- League: IV liga Pomerania
- 2025–26: IV liga Pomerania, 3rd of 18
Home colours	Away colours	Third colours

Klub Piłkarski Starogard Gdański is a Polish football team from Starogard Gdański, Poland. As of the 2025–26 season, they compete in the IV liga Pomerania, the fifth level of competition, having suffered relegation from the 2023–24 III liga.

== History ==
The club were founded in 2008, joining the B Klasa for the 2008–09 season. In their first season the club won promotion by winning their league. They followed their initial success with two more consecutive promotions going from the eighth tier to the fifth tier in three seasons. In 2017 the club were promoted to the III liga, managing to stay in the league finishing comfortably in 9th. In the 2017–18 season, Starogard Gdański won the regional, Pomeranian Voivodeship Polish Cup, meaning the club would be entered into the national cup the following season. Starogard Gdański had their greatest national success the following season in 2018–19, making a name for themselves in the Polish Cup. They won their first game against Górnik Łęczna 1–0 to advance to the round of 32, eventually being knocked out of the competition to I liga side Puszcza Niepołomice 3–1. The club played in the III liga from 2017 until 2024, when it dropped to the IV liga Pomerania.

== Stadium ==
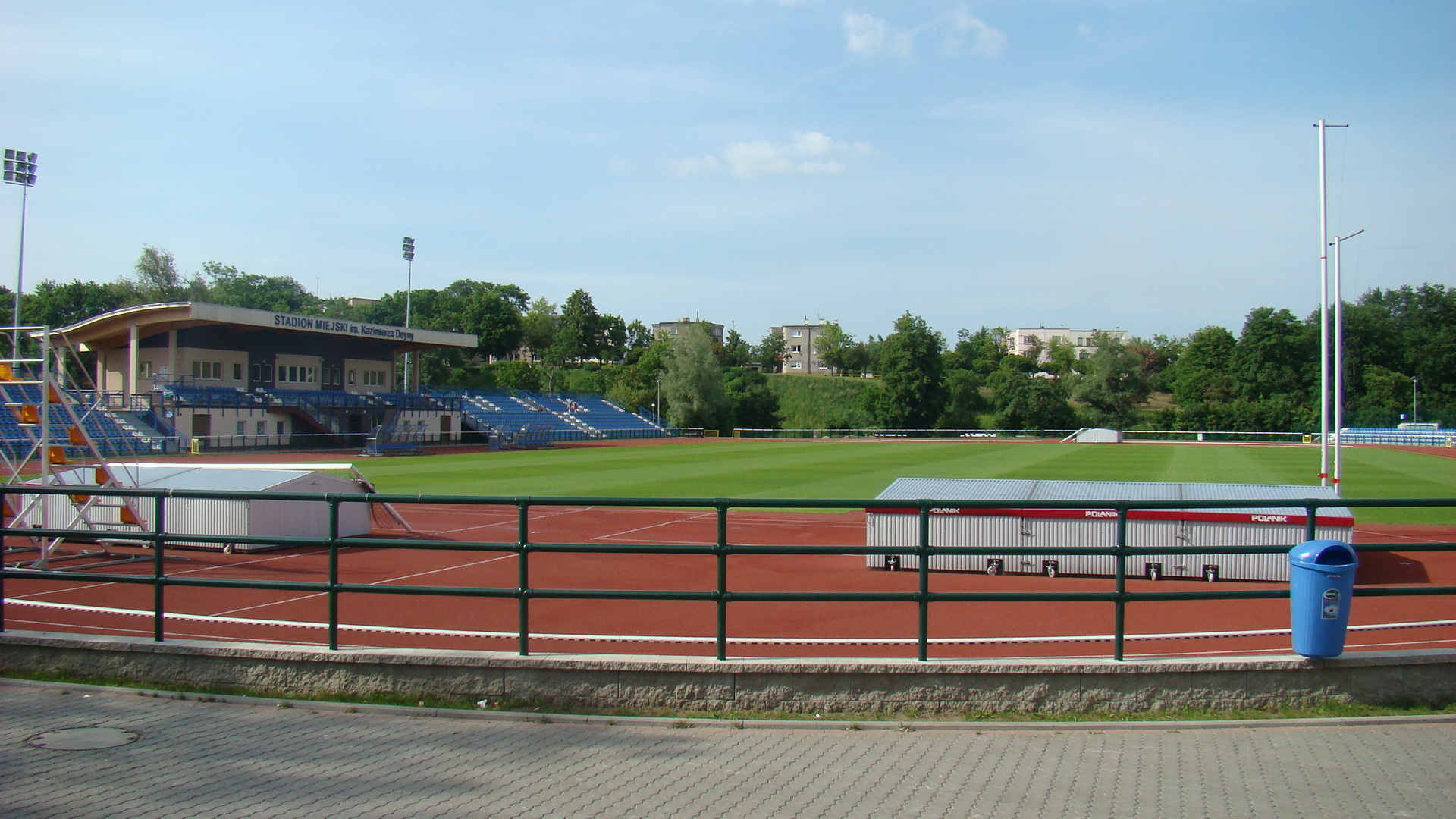
Stadion miejski im. Kazimierza Deyny

The club plays its matches at the Stadion miejski im. Kazimierza Deyny which is located Starogard Gdański at Olimpijczyków Starogardzkich 1.

Two Regional Polish Cup finals at the Pomeranian district level were held at the stadium, in the 2011–12 season and in the 2016–17 season, and two Polish Cup matches in the 2018–19 season.

== Kociewian Derby ==
The Kociewian Derby is a match between Wierzyca Pelplin and KP Starogard Gdański.

The first Kociewie derby took place in the 2011–12 season and ended with a 3–1 victory for Wierzyca, the next derby this season ended with a 3–2 victory for KPS. The next derby was played in the 2014–15 season, ending with a 1–1 draw and Wierzyca's victory 2–0. In the 2016–17 season, both matches ended with Wierzyca's victory (5–1, 1–0). In the 2017–18 season, derby matches ended in a 1–1 draw and the team from Starogard Gdański won 2–0. In the 2018–19 season, both matches ended in a draw (2–2, 0–0). The next derby took place in the 2024–25 season. On 9 November 2024, KPS lost to Wierzyca 1–0. The second derby match this season took place on 1 June and ended in a 1–1 draw.

Balance of Derby matches
KP Starogard Gdański	Draw	Wierzyca Pelplin
2	5	5

== Honours ==
- Polish Cup: Round of 32 (2018–19)
- III liga: 4th place (best finish)
- Pomeranian Voivodeship Polish Cup: 2017–18

=== Seasons ===
Season	League	Tier	Position	Matches	Pts.	W	D	L	GF	GA	GD
2008–09	Klasa B (Malbork VIII)	VIII	1 of 11	20	52	17	1	2	102	21	+81
2009–10	Klasa A (Gdańsk III)	VII	1 of 12	22	56	18	2	2	78	17	+61
2010–11	District League (g. II)	VI	1 of 14	26	69	22	3	1	76	32	+44
2011–12	IV liga (Pomerania)	V	15 of 16	30	28	9	1	20	39	68	-29
2012–13	District League (g. II)	VI	4 of 16	30	59	18	5	7	95	33	+62
2013–14	District League (g. II)	VI	1 of 16	30	75	23	6	1	100	31	+69
2014–15	IV liga (Pomerania)	V	3 of 18	34	68	20	8	6	80	39	+41
2015–16	IV liga (Pomerania)	V	3 of 18	34	66	20	6	8	92	35	+57
2016–17	IV liga (Pomerania)	V	2 of 18	34	66	20	6	8	73	40	+33
2017–18	III liga (g. II)	IV	9 of 18	34	51	15	6	13	46	32	+14
2018–19	III liga (g. II)	IV	10 of 18	34	51	14	9	11	56	37	+19
2019–20	III liga (g. II)	IV	8 of 18	18	25	7	4	7	19	20	-1
2020–21	III liga (g. II)	IV	4 of 18	34	61	19	4	12	48	46	+2
2021–22	III liga (g. II)	IV	11 of 18	34	42	11	9	14	44	51	-7
2022–23	III liga (g. II)	IV	6 of 18	34	59	17	8	9	44	35	+9
2023–24	III liga (g. II)	IV	18 of 18	34	13	2	7	25	39	97	-46
2024–25	IV liga (Pomerania)	V	4 of 18	34	58	16	10	8	65	47	+18
2025–26	IV liga (Pomerania)	V	3 of 18	34	69	20	9	5	88	38	+50
