= Gryf Wejherowo =

- Full name: Wejherowski Klub Sportowy "Gryf"
- Nickname(s): Żółto-czarni (The Yellow And Blacks)
- Founded: 1921 (as Towarzystwo Sportowe Kaszubia)
- Ground: WKS Gryf Stadium
- Capacity: 2,500
- Coordinates: 54°35′32″N 18°13′38″E
- Chairman: Dariusz Mikołajczak
- Manager: Dawid Kowalski
- League: IV liga Pomerania
- 2023–24: IV liga Pomerania, 6th of 18
- Website: https://gryfwejherowo1.futbolowo.pl
Home colours	Away colours

Gryf Wejherowo is a Polish football club in Wejherowo, Poland. (Note: The full name has changed several times: 1921: Towarzystwo Sportowe "Kaszubia" Wejherowo; 1945: Klub Sportowy "Gryf"; 1952: Miejski Międzyzakładowy Klub Sportowy "Gryf"; 1998: Wejherowski Klub Sportowy "Gryf"; 2005: Wejherowski Klub Sportowy "Gryf-Northpol" Wejherowo; 2007: Wejherowski Klub Sportowy "Gryf Orlex" Wejherowo; 2012: Wejherowski Klub Sportowy "Gryf Orlex"; 2014: Wejherowski Klub Sportowy "Gryf") The club plays in the IV liga Pomerania. It was founded as TS Kaszubia in 1921, but after World War II the club was renamed to Gryf Wejherowo.

Gryf Wejherowo is the oldest football club in Pomeranian Voivodeship, and for several years was the only club in the region playing in the II liga. It is well known in Poland for reaching the 2011–12 Polish Cup quarterfinals after beating clubs from the Polish top-flight and second tier.

== Football team ==
. Previously there was an ultras group of supporters called Żółto-czarni – which prepared banners, flags, and chanted at all of the matches – but dissolved after supporters started to boycott Gryf Wejherowo because of a conflict with the club's management. Gryf's fans are friendly with Kaszubia Kościerzyna and Orkan Rumia supporters. The latter of the two is also one of Gryf Wejherowo's local rivals. Most of the Gryf fans also support Arka Gdynia.

Gryf Wejherowo does not just have one or two rivals, but has several clubs that clearly have feelings of animosity towards them. Some of the more notable rival clubs are Bałtyk Gdynia and Bytovia Bytów. Matches involving these two rivals often feed to a lot of anticipation and antagonistic promotion, and extra security. Gryf Wejherowo has local friendly rivalries. Orkan Rumia and Orlęta Reda are two local rivals located in Wejherowo County and compete against Gryf Wejherowo in the Kashubian Tricity local derby.

Gryf Wejherowo's first shirt sponsor was the town council of Wejherowo until 2004. The next sponsor was Northpol, and from 2007 to 2014, the Gryf Wejherowo strategic sponsor was Orlex, which supported the club with 500,000zł every year, and starting in 2012 Orlex became Gryf Wejherowo's title sponsor. Some of the secondary sponsors were: Northpol, and PKS Wejherowo. Since 2015-16 season the club does not have any shirt sponsors.

First-team appearances history from 1927

=== Roster ===
Note: Flags indicate national team as defined under FIFA eligibility rules; some limited exceptions apply. Players may hold more than one non-FIFA nationality.

No.	Pos.	Nation	Player
1	GK	(Poland) POL	Dawid Leleń
2	DF	(Poland) POL	Igor Biedrzycki
3	MF	(Poland) POL	Bartosz Gęsior
4	DF	(Poland) POL	Tomasz Wojcinowicz
5	DF	(Poland) POL	Oskar Koprowski
6	MF	(Poland) POL	Oskar Sikorski
7	DF	(Poland) POL	Maciej Prusinowski
9	FW	(Poland) POL	Mateusz Majewski
10	MF	(Poland) POL	Maksymilian Hebel
11	DF	(Poland) POL	Mateusz Goerke
12	GK	(Poland) POL	Wiesław Ferra
14	FW	(Poland) POL	Paweł Czychowski

No.	Pos.	Nation	Player
18	MF	(Poland) POL	Marcin Burkhardt
19	MF	(Poland) POL	Filip Szewczyk
20	MF	(Poland) POL	Tomasz Kolus
21	MF	(Poland) POL	Jakub Pek
23	FW	(Poland) POL	Szymon Nowicki
—	MF	(Poland) POL	Mikołaj Gabor
—	DF	(Poland) POL	Kamil Kankowski
—	MF	(Poland) POL	Fabian Kątny
—	MF	(Poland) POL	Kacper Małolepszy
—	MF	(Poland) POL	Jakub Poręba
—	DF	(Poland) POL	Mariusz Sławek

As of 5 August 2019

The football managers were:

- 1921 – 1991: unknown
- 1994 – 2007: Mieczysław Gierszewski
- 1997 – 2004: Wojciech Bork
- 2004 – 2005: Dariusz German
- 2005 – 2007: Ryszard Szewczyk
- 2007 – 2007: Tomasz Unton
- 2008 – 2011: Wojciech Wasiek, former Gryf player
- 2011 – 2012: Grzegorz Niciński, banned for participating in a 2004 match-fixing scandal, while he was a player
- 2012 – 2013: Dariusz Mierzejewski
- 2013 – 2014: Grzegorz Niciński
- 2014 – 2015: Tomasz Kotwica, former Gryf player
- 2015 – 2016: Piotr Rzepka
- 2016 – 2016: Mariusz Pawlak
- 2017 – 2017: Jarosław Kotas, assistant manager
- 2017 – 2017: Piotr Rzepka
- 2018 – 2018: Jarosław Kotas, assistant manager
- 2018 – 2018: Tomasz Kotwica, Gryf U-19 manager
- 2018 – 2019: Zbigniew Szymkowicz
- 2019 – present: Łukasz Kowalski

=== Colours ===
The home colours have always been yellow and black, the Kashubians national colors. The numbers have always been black.

The away colours were previously all-black with yellow accents, including the socks. But there were also several years in the 1990s, when the away jersey was pink and black. During the 2010–2012 seasons, the away jersey stripes were changed to their sponsor's colours: red, navy blue and white, however they were dropped. Currently the away jersey is a white shirt with black bars on the shoulders, worn with black shorts and white socks.

== Sports club ==
=== History ===
In April 1921, a Polish Sokół movement nest was the first gymnastics association organized in Wejherowo. Soon after that the predecessor of the current Wejherowo sports club, Kaszubia, was organized, along with Siła and some other smaller associations. Because of Sokół, the city became famous for top national boxers and long-distance runners, despite that they lacked modern training facilities, which were completed in 1927. Sokół nest had 700 members. Wejherowo's sports movement regularly organized various competitions and hosted nationally renowned tournaments including the "Błękitną Wstęgę Bałtyku", a tennis blue riband event in which players such as Ignacy Tłoczyński, Józef Hebda, and Jadwiga Jędrzejowska competed. The development of this sports movement was stopped by World War II.

After in April 1945, all sport clubs in Wejherowo merged. In 1952 the club name was changed to "Miejski Międzyzakładowy Klub Sportowy (MMKS) 'Gryf'." Kaszubia was considered the most important of them all. There were also single sport clubs, like Czytelnik and Wejherowianka, but they quickly fell into obscurity and dissolved.

The heritage of Interwar period sports clubs was mainly dominated by boxing. MMKS Gryf was also a club for boxers; past members who competed for the club include Olympic medal winners Hubert Skrzypczak and Henryk Dampc. Despite these successes, the importance of the sports club decreased because it lacks the financial support of a large local employer for development so the sports club lost boxers to GKS Wybrzeże i Stoczniowca, footballers to various clubs, and handball players to Starty Gdańsk. On a side note, Gryf had also won the Polish women's team bowling cup during this period.

In the 1970s, the club's football team was promoted to the third tier of the Polish football league system but was demoted three years later. Football's popularity grew in Wejherowo and eventually dominated over the club's other sports. Football in Wejherowo even kept its popularity supreme over basketball, during the 1980s, when basketball was making some headway and accomplishing minor achievements.

The team again was promoted to the III liga in 1992, but was demoted five years later in a restructuring of the Polish football league system. By 1998, the team returned to the previous division as "WKS Gryf Wejherowo" and won a Regional Polish Cup. In 1995, some of the club's athletes left the team and founded a new club, KS Wejher Wejherowo.

During the years 1999–2004 were definitely the most difficult in the club's history. The club was in debt to the amount of 300,000 zł, which was equivalent to £43,336 as of 2004. For a time, until 2002, the club was not exclusively focused on football but also bowling and duplicate bridge. The team was the only club from the region which played in the pre-2008 III liga season. During that time, it included a few players, such as Dawid Pomorski and Wojciech Pięta, who are widely regarded today as legends. Both Pomorski and Pięta—despite the club's debt and difficulty paying it—are widely credited within the community of Wejherowo for competing at a level that raised the team to the III liga, and in turn won two regional cups in 2000 and 2003. But at the end of the 2003–2004 season, the team was relegated to the IV liga and the board resigned.

Rafał Szlas became the Gryf Wejherowo chairman in 2004. With Szlas's company he paid off all the club's debts and started to rebuild Gryf Wejherowo after suffering another relegation to the V liga. In 2006, the team reached the 4th tier, and gained a new club sponsor: The Orlex Company. From 2006–2009, the club reached higher divisions using local players, but when they reached the 4th tier, which was renamed the III liga, they decided to appoint a director of football; Wiesław Renusz. Renusz immediately started to trade for new young and talented players, like Grzegorz Gicewicz and Przemysław Kostuch, who are still playing for Gryf. In fact, Gicewicz and Kostuch are widely considered two of the best players in the club's history. In May 2011, former Ekstraklasa player Grzegorz Niciński was hired as the team manager. With Niciński's arrival, he has changed the club's winning average into one of the best in the Pomeranian Voivodeship, to boot, he led the club to win another Polish regional cup. In June 2011, the team reached the quarterfinals of the Central Polish Cup and got promoted to the II liga in June 2012. Unfortunately, Niciński was banned in 2012 for eight months by the Polish Football Association for participating in a 2004 match-fixing scandal, while he was a player. The team's temporary manager became Dariusz Mierzejewski who managed until July 2013. In July 2016 Mariusz Pawlak became new Gryf Wejherowo's manager.

In 2011, a book about the club's history was published: 9 Dekad Gryfa. (Note: Not found in WorldCat.)

=== Honours ===
- One Polish Women's Team Bowling Cup
- Four Polish Regional FA Cups: 1997–1998, 1999–2000, 2002–2003, 2010–2011

=== Crest ===
Gryf Wejherowo's crest is a black Kashubian griffin with a crown, turned to the left on a basic gold shield surrounded by a blue, white and gold circle where the club's name is accompanied by a six-pointed star.

=== Venue ===
WKS Gryf Wejherowo plays its home matches at WKS "Gryf" Stadium, which is located in the forest south of Wejherowo. The stadium was built between 1924 and 1927 and has two grass pitches: the main pitch is on the central part of the plot of land, and the smaller pitch is reserved for training, and is on an elevated part of the plot of land located to the south. Initially the area was designed for a military shooting range. The stadium's maximum capacity is 2,500, however there are only 1,050 seats.

The stadium has floodlights but it is still not possible to play an official match at night there.

=== Officials ===
The current club officials are:

- Chairman: Dariusz Mikołajczak
- Co-chairmen: Wiesław Renusz, Piotr Wieczorek
- Treasurer: Krzysztof Wilkowski
- Youth board member: Tadeusz Ciapa

== See also ==
- Lower Level Football Leagues in Interwar Poland
