= List of Lechia Gdańsk players =

This is a complete list of known Lechia Gdańsk players and their known competition statistics for the club since the clubs formation in 1945.

== Information ==
This list also includes the players who played for Olimpia-Lechia Gdańsk and Lechia-Polonia Gdańsk due to these teams being created by mergers of Lechia Gdańsk and another team, and these teams replacing Lechia Gdańsk in the league. For the Olimpia-Lechia Gdańsk team, the club was a result of a merger between Lechia Gdańsk and Olimpia Poznań, the original Lechia Gdańsk team became known as Lechia Gdańsk II for the 1995–96 season, becoming the first team again the season after. Statistics for both the Olimpia-Lechia Gdańsk and Lechia Gdańsk II (for the 1995–96 season) are listed. The situation is slightly different with Lechia-Polonia Gdańsk who played from 1998 until 2002. This merger between Lechia Gdańsk and Polonia Gdańsk resulted in there being no Lechia Gdańsk team between 1998 and 2001, when the team reformed in the lowest divisions. For the 2001–02 season both Lechia-Polonia Gdańsk and the newly formed Lechia Gdańsk played in the leagues. Statistics for Lechia-Polonia Gdańsk from 1998 until 2002 are shown, as well as the original and current Lechia Gdańsk teams statistics since 2001. There are therefore two seasons in which two clubs count towards statistics for Lechia Gdańsk, 1995–1996 and 2001–2002. During the 1995–1996 season the original Lechia Gdańsk team was known as Lechia Gdańsk II, the league stats for the II team are being treated as normal II team stats and are included in the Other section.

There are 8 players where only the last name is known. Throughout the early years of Lechia's history the team did not always document players information as much as they do now, and news papers often only reported the players last names. Despite not knowing the full identity of these players they have still been included as they have still made appearances for Lechia Gdańsk.

== Key ==
The table below identifies the sorting of the players stats.

Key
League	Ekstraklasa, I liga, II liga, III liga, IV liga, District league, Class A, A Class Championships
Cup	Polish Cup, League Cups, Polish Super Cup, Regional Polish Cup, Lechia Gdańsk II cup apps
Europe	UEFA Intertoto Cup, UEFA Cup Winners' Cup, UEFA Europa League, UEFA Europa Conference League
Other	Divisional playoffs, Lechia Gdańsk II league apps
Players
**Bold**	Still at the club
*	Denotes that the player has only ever played for the Lechia Gdańsk II team (This is used for the 1995–96 season when the original Lechia Gdańsk team was being used as the Olimpia-Lechia Gdańsk second team)
†	Denotes that the player only ever played for the team when it was known as Olimpia-Lechia Gdańsk
‡	Denotes that the player only ever played for the team when it was known as Lechia-Polonia Gdańsk

== Player statistics ==
The stats will be next updated after the end of the 2026–27 season and are correct as of 1 July 2026. This table will be updated at the end of each season, or before the end of the season for players who move to other clubs.

(Stats updated to 1 July 2026)

Player information				League		Cup		European		Other		Total		Ref.
Name	Nat.	Pos.	Lechia career	Apps	Goals	A.	G.	A.	G.	A.	G.	A.	G.	
Joel; Abu Hanna	ISR	DF	2022–2023	14	0	2	0	0	0	0	0	16	0	
Bogdan; Adamczyk	POL	FW	1954–1968	202	73	12	4	0	0	2	1	216	78	
Roman; Adamczyk	POL	MF	1949–1950	2	0	0	0	0	0	0	0	2	0	
Zygmunt; Adamczyk	POL	DF	1949	1	0	0	0	0	0	0	0	1	0	
Arkadiusz; Adamowski	POL	GK	1997	1	0	0	0	0	0	0	0	1	0	
Danijel; Aleksić	SRB	FW	2014	3	0	1	0	0	0	6	3	10	3	
Zlatan; Alomerović	SRB	GK	2018–2021	24	0	13	0	0	0	6	0	43	0	
Vytautas; Andriuškevičius	LIT	DF	2010–2012	32	0	4	0	0	0	15	1	51	1	
Artur; Andruszczak	POL	MF	2007–2009	30	3	9	1	0	0	0	0	39	4	
Artur; Antończuk ‡	POL	MF	2002	13	0	0	0	0	0	0	0	13	0	
Napoleon; Amaefule ‡	NGR	FW	2000	17	1	6	1	0	0	0	0	23	2	
Jarosław; Ambroziak	POL	DF	1986–1987	24	0	0	0	0	0	1	0	25	0	
Piotr; Antkowicz ‡	POL	DF	2002	12	2	0	0	0	0	0	0	12	2	
Leszek; Antos	POL	FW	1960–1961	18	0	0	0	0	0	0	0	18	0	
Jerzy; Apolewicz	POL	MF	1959–1972	249	57	9	0	0	0	2	0	260	57	
Bogdan; Araminowicz	POL	DF	1950–1952	15	0	3	0	0	0	2	0	20	0	
Jakub; Arak	POL	FW	2018–2021	35	1	6	0	0	0	7	6	48	7	
Błażej; Augustyn	POL	DF	2017–2019	57	5	5	0	2	0	1	0	65	5	
Mohamed; Awad Alla	UAE	MF	2025–2026	8	1	3	0	0	0	0	0	11	1	
Joseph; Aziz †	GHA	FW	1995	2	0	0	0	0	0	0	0	2	0	
Jarosław; Bach ‡	POL	DF	2000–2002	18	0	2	0	0	0	0	0	20	0	
Waldemar; Bajer	POL	MF	1972–1973	21	3	0	0	0	0	0	0	21	3	
Marko; Bajić	SRB	MF	2009–2012	58	2	7	1	0	0	7	3	72	6	
Witold; Bakalarczyk *	POL	GK	1996	0	0	0	0	0	0	2	0	2	0	
Romário; Baldé	GNB; POR	FW	2017	10	1	0	0	0	0	0	0	10	1	
Dawid; Banaczek	POL	FW	1995–1999	55	12	0	0	0	0	12	5	67	17	
Tomasz; Banaszak	POL	MF	2001	0	0	1	0	0	0	0	0	1	0	
Mariusz; Banit	POL	MF	1988–1989	20	0	1	0	0	0	2	0	23	0	
Henryk; Baran	POL	FW	1952–1953	16	4	3	0	0	0	0	0	19	4	
Stanisław; Baran	POL	FW	1945–1946	5	17	0	0	0	0	3	10	8	27	
Jakub; Bartkowski	POL	DF	2023	16	1	0	0	0	0	0	0	16	1	
Bartnik	POL	FW	1950	0	0	1	0	0	0	0	0	1	0	
Marek; Bartosiak	POL	MF	1969–1974	45	18	2	0	0	0	0	0	47	18	
Krzysztof; Bartoszuk	POL	DF	2001–2003	40	2	9	1	0	0	0	0	49	3	
Ryszard; Bartylewski	POL	MF	1946	0	0	1	0	0	0	0	0	1	0	
Krzysztof; Baszkiewicz	POL	MF	1950–1952	23	14	11	2	0	0	6	3	40	19	
Sérgio; Batata ‡	BRA; POL	MF	1998	7	1	0	0	0	0	0	0	7	1	
Arkadiusz; Bąk †	POL	MF	1995	14	2	1	0	0	0	0	0	15	2	
Jacek; Bąk	POL	MF	1985–1987	62	3	3	0	2	1	2	0	69	4	
Krzysztof; Bąk	POL	DF	2009–2014	106	5	14	0	0	0	6	0	126	5	
Mateusz; Bąk	POL	GK	2001–2010, 2013–2017	219	1	26	0	0	0	24	0	269	1	
Piotr; Bebak	POL	FW	1975–1976	1	0	1	0	0	0	0	0	2	0	
Zbigniew; Bemowski	POL	DF	1982	7	0	0	0	0	0	0	0	7	0	
Fred; Benson	NED	FW	2011	11	1	1	0	0	0	0	0	12	1	
Bartosz; Berlik ‡	POL	DF	2001	10	1	1	0	0	0	0	0	11	1	
Kamil; Biecke	POL	GK	2004–2005	17	0	2	0	0	0	0	0	19	0	
Jan; Biegański	POL	MF	2021–2024	45	1	2	0	1	0	4	0	52	1	
Jarosław; Bieniuk	POL	DF	1996–1998, 2012–2014	80	2	4	0	0	0	9	0	93	2	
Arkadiusz; Bieńkowski	POL	FW	1957–1958, 1961	11	1	1	0	0	0	0	0	12	1	
Andrzej; Bikiewicz	POL	FW	1982	7	1	0	0	0	0	0	0	7	1	
Jakub; Biskup	POL	MF	2004–2006	53	7	1	0	0	0	0	0	54	7	
Michał; Biskup ‡	POL	MF	1999–2000	21	0	2	0	0	0	0	0	23	0	
Mariusz; Bloch	POL	DF	2001–2003	35	11	7	1	0	0	0	0	42	12	
Bolesław; Błaszczyk	POL	FW	1980–1982	22	6	6	3	0	0	0	0	28	9	
Mieszko; Błaszczyk *	POL	DF	1995	0	0	0	0	0	0	4	0	4	0	
Jakub; Bławat	POL	FW	2004–2005	24	14	2	3	0	0	0	0	26	17	
Radosław; Błondek	POL	FW	1992–1993	36	1	2	0	0	0	0	0	38	1	
**Tomáš**; **Bobček**	SVK	FW	2023–	70	37	4	1	0	0	0	0	74	38	
Stanisław; Bogucki	POL	MF	1970	1	0	0	0	0	0	0	0	1	0	
**Bartosz**; **Borkowski**	POL	MF	2023–	1	0	0	0	0	0	3	2	4	2	
Tomasz; Borkowski	POL	DF	1994, 1996–2005	239	8	19	2	0	0	0	0	258	10	
Tomasz; Borowiec ‡	POL	GK	2000–2001	1	0	2	0	0	0	0	0	3	0	
Maciej; Borowski	POL	MF	1990	5	0	0	0	0	0	0	0	5	0	
Arkadiusz; Borucki	POL	FW	1967	1	0	0	0	0	0	0	0	1	0	
Piotr; Boruń	POL	FW	1982–1983	2	0	0	0	0	0	0	0	2	0	
Ariel; Borysiuk	POL	MF	2014–2015, 2017–2018	86	3	3	0	0	0	5	4	94	7	
Marcin; Borzęcki	POL	MF	1996–1997, 2002	7	0	0	0	0	0	1	0	8	0	
Wojciech; Borzęcki	POL	MF	1976–1978	11	2	1	0	0	0	0	0	12	2	
Mavroudis; Bougaidis	GRE	DF	2014–2015	12	0	0	0	0	0	6	1	18	1	
Krzysztof; Brede	POL	DF	2004–2008; 2011–2012	83	13	6	0	0	0	26	1	115	14	
Tomasz; Broner ‡	POL	MF	2001	12	3	1	0	0	0	0	0	13	3	
Piotr; Brożek	POL	DF	2012–2013	24	1	0	0	0	0	0	0	24	1	
Bartosz; Brzęk	POL	DF	2022–2025	6	0	1	0	0	0	3	0	10	0	
Piotr; Bubiłek ‡	POL	DF	2000	2	0	4	0	0	0	0	0	6	0	
Paweł; Bubółka *	POL	GK	1995–1996	0	0	0	0	0	0	15	0	15	0	
Michał; Buchalik	POL	GK	2011–2013, 2022–2023	32	0	3	0	0	0	19	0	54	0	
Łukasz; Budziłek	POL	GK	2015–2016	9	0	1	0	0	0	14	0	24	0	
Dawid; Bugaj	POL	DF	2023–2024	27	0	1	0	0	0	0	0	28	0	
Adam; Buksa	POL	FW	2014–2016	16	1	1	0	0	0	10	3	27	4	
Serhiy; Buletsa	UKR	MF	2024–2025	7	0	1	0	0	0	0	0	8	0	
Piotr; Burlikowski †	POL	FW	1995	4	0	0	0	0	0	0	0	4	0	
Stanisław; Burzyński	POL	GK	1967–1969	23	0	1	0	0	0	0	0	24	0	
Michael; Butler ‡	LBR	FW	1999	1	0	0	0	0	0	0	0	1	0	
Bédi; Buval	MTQ	FW	2010–2011	23	2	6	1	0	0	0	0	29	3	
Paweł; Buzała	POL	FW	2006–2010, 2013–2014	143	32	19	10	0	0	8	3	170	45	
Ireneusz; Calski	POL	MF	1987–1988	11	1	3	0	0	0	0	0	14	1	
Henrik; Castegren	SWE	DF	2022–2023	7	0	1	0	0	0	1	0	9	0	
Joenal; Castma ‡	HAI	FW	1999	1	0	0	0	0	0	0	0	1	0	
Joseph; Ceesay	SWE	MF	2021–2022	33	1	1	1	0	0	0	0	34	2	
Piotr; Cetnarowicz	POL	FW	2006–2008	77	25	8	1	0	0	0	0	85	26	
Janusz; Charczuk	POL	FW	1960–1968	151	23	7	1	0	0	2	0	160	24	
Marcin; Chmielewski	POL	FW	2004	3	0	1	0	0	0	0	0	4	0	
Jacek; Chociej	POL	FW	1987–1992	139	13	4	0	0	0	4	0	147	13	
Michał; Chrapek	POL	MF	2015–2017	32	1	2	0	0	0	4	0	38	1	
Adam; Chrzanowski	POL	DF	2015–2019	16	2	3	0	0	0	28	1	47	3	
Artur; Chrzonowski	POL	DF	1995–1999	66	3	3	0	0	0	29	2	98	5	
Jarosław; Chwiałkowski ‡	POL	FW	1999	15	1	2	1	0	0	0	0	17	2	
Andrei; Chindriș	ROM	DF	2023–2025	36	0	2	0	0	0	0	0	38	0	
Jarosław; Chwastek	POL	DF	1996, 2000	24	1	3	0	0	0	0	0	27	1	
Paweł; Chylak	POL	DF	2002	1	0	0	0	0	0	0	0	1	0	
Jaroslaw; Cieśliński	POL	FW	1995, 1997–1999	23	3	2	1	0	0	1	0	26	4	
Marcin; Ciliński †	POL	MF	1995–1996	26	3	0	0	0	0	0	0	26	3	
Łukasz; Ciucias	POL	MF	2001–2004	40	3	7	0	0	0	0	0	47	3	
Christian; Clemens	GER	MF	2022	22	1	0	0	4	0	0	0	26	1	
Conrado	BRA	DF	2019–2024	118	5	10	0	4	0	0	0	132	5	
Jacek; Cuch ‡	POL	DF	1998–2000	16	0	3	0	0	0	0	0	19	0	
Aleksander; Cybulski	POL	DF	1983–1990, 1992–1993	194	9	5	0	1	0	11	0	211	9	
Dariusz; Czachor	POL	DF	1981–1982	7	0	0	0	0	0	0	0	7	0	
Dominik; Czajka	POL	DF	1995–1996, 1998, 2004	15	2	6	0	0	0	2	0	23	1	
Zbigniew; Czajka	POL	GK	2001–2002	4	0	1	0	0	0	0	0	5	0	
Jerzy; Czubała	POL	FW	1952–1959	68	2	15	2	0	0	0	0	83	4	
Maciej; Czuczeło ‡	POL	MF	2002	11	0	0	0	0	0	0	0	11	0	
Daniel; Czuk ‡	POL	DF	2001	14	0	0	0	0	0	0	0	14	0	
Paweł; Czychowski	POL	FW	2011–2015	1	0	0	0	0	0	73	25	44	25	
Zygmunt; Czyżewski	POL	MF	1945–1946	0	0	0	0	0	0	4	2	4	2	
Aleksandar; Ćirković	SRB	MF	2025–2026	24	3	3	2	0	0	0	0	27	5	
Frane; Čačić	CRO	MF	2008	1	0	3	0	0	0	0	0	4	0	
Antonio; Čolak	CRO	FW	2014–2015	30	10	1	0	0	0	1	0	32	10	
Peter; Čvirik	SVK	DF	2009–2010	21	1	1	0	0	0	2	1	24	2	
Krzysztof; Dadacz ‡	POL	GK	2002	6	0	0	0	0	0	0	0	6	0	
Andriy; Danayev ‡	UKR	MF	2001	5	0	0	0	0	0	0	0	5	0	
Marcin; Danielewicz ‡	POL	FW	1998	12	2	2	0	0	0	0	0	14	2	
Tomasz; Dargacz ‡	POL	GK	2002	2	0	0	0	0	0	0	0	2	0	
Louis; D'Arrigo	AUS	MF	2023–2025	33	1	2	1	0	0	0	0	35	2	
Paweł; Dawidowicz	POL	MF	2012–2014	34	1	2	0	0	0	15	0	51	1	
Tomasz; Dawidowski	POL	FW	1995–1998, 2009–2012	108	21	12	0	0	0	0	0	120	21	
Henryk; Dąbrowski	POL	GK	1949	2	0	0	0	0	0	0	0	2	0	
Jacek; Dąbrowski †	POL	MF	1995	12	1	1	0	0	0	0	0	13	1	
Stefan; Delega	POL	FW	1972–1974	54	6	4	0	0	0	0	0	58	6	
Deleu	BRA; POL	DF	2010–2014	98	3	9	0	0	0	9	2	116	5	
Bassekou; Diabaté	MLI	FW	2021–2023	43	0	2	0	1	0	5	9	51	9	
Janusz; Dobosz	POL	MF	1960	1	0	0	0	0	0	0	0	1	0	
Bartosz; Dolański ‡	POL	MF	2002	13	0	0	0	0	0	0	0	13	0	
Piotr; Domitr	POL	FW	1979–1981	28	3	0	0	0	0	0	0	28	3	
Adam; Duda	POL	FW	2010–2014	26	5	1	0	0	0	49	21	76	26	
Janusz; Duda	POL	MF	1984	5	0	0	0	0	0	0	0	5	0	
Mieczysław; Dudek	POL	DF	1952	7	0	5	0	0	0	0	0	12	0	
Adam; Dudziński	POL	FW	1953–1954	1	0	2	0	0	0	0	0	3	0	
İlkay; Durmuş	TUR	MF	2021–2023	58	7	4	2	4	0	0	0	66	9	
Maksym; Dyachuk	UKR	DF	2025–2026	26	1	2	1	0	0	0	0	28	2	
Karol; Dymanowski	POL	FW	1994	1	0	0	0	0	0	0	0	1	0	
Filip; Dymerski	POL	DF	2018–	2	0	3	0	0	0	26	0	31	0	
Artur; Dyszkiewicz ‡	POL	GK	2002	6	0	0	0	0	0	0	0	6	0	
Ryszard; Dziadek	POL	DF	1976–1978	65	4	5	0	0	0	0	0	70	4	
Jan; Dziekański	POL	MF	1946	1	1	0	0	0	0	0	0	1	1	
Łukasz; Dziengielewicz	POL	FW	2007	1	0	0	0	0	0	0	0	1	0	
Mariusz; Dzienis	POL	MF	2005–2006	25	1	0	0	0	0	0	0	25	1	
Adam; Dźwigała	POL	DF	2014–2016	10	0	2	0	0	0	14	3	26	3	
Jan; Erlich	POL	MF	1978–1981	77	13	5	0	0	0	0	0	82	13	
Justin; Evans ‡	USA	MF	2000	8	0	0	0	0	0	0	0	8	0	
Tadeusz; Fajfer	POL	GK	1982–1984	41	0	8	0	2	0	0	0	51	0	
Marek; Fanslau ‡	POL	FW	2002	8	1	0	0	0	0	0	0	8	1	
Sebastian; Fechner	POL	DF	2005–2008	65	5	3	0	0	0	0	0	68	5	
Michał; Fedorowicz ‡	POL	FW	2002	14	1	0	0	0	0	0	0	14	1	
Adam; Fedoruk ‡	POL	MF	1998–2001	50	11	3	2	0	0	0	0	53	13	
Mirosław; Feith ‡	POL	FW	1998–2002	63	8	7	1	0	0	0	0	70	9	
Luis; Fernández	ESP	MF	2023–2024	13	6	1	1	0	0	0	0	14	7	
Karol; Fila	POL	DF	2017–2021	87	2	13	1	2	0	11	0	113	3	
Piotr; Filipik	POL	FW	1993–1996	45	2	5	1	0	0	0	0	50	3	
Marcin; Florek ‡	POL	FW	2000	14	1	5	0	0	0	0	0	19	1	
Marek; Fostiak	POL	DF	1982	4	0	0	0	0	0	0	0	4	0	
Leszek; Futyma	POL	DF	1963	2	0	0	0	0	0	0	0	2	0	
Wincenty; Franiel	POL	FW	1950	4	2	0	0	0	0	0	0	4	2	
Przemysław; Frankowski	POL	MF	2012–2014	43	2	3	1	0	0	11	1	57	4	
Jacek; Frąckiewicz	POL	MF	1988	19	5	1	0	0	0	2	0	22	5	
Janusz; Frąckiewicz	POL	MF	1962	1	0	0	0	0	0	0	0	1	0	
Kazimierz; Frąckiewicz	POL	FW	1956–1959, 1961–1964	88	13	3	0	0	0	2	1	93	14	
Kevin; Friesenbichler	AUT	FW	2014–2015, 2023	29	5	0	0	0	0	2	2	31	7	
Roman; Frydryszak	POL	MF	1995	15	3	0	0	0	0	0	0	15	3	
Zygmunt; Gadecki	POL	FW	1957–1958, 1961	68	11	1	0	0	0	0	0	69	11	
Maciej; Gajos	POL	MF	2019–2023	118	13	12	4	5	1	2	3	137	21	
Milen; Gamakov	BUL	MF	2016	4	0	1	0	0	0	0	0	5	0	
Jerzy; Gański	POL	MF	1962–1963, 1966	16	0	0	0	0	0	0	0	16	0	
Damian; Garbacik	POL	DF	2013–2015	2	0	0	0	0	0	33	2	35	2	
Gevorg; Gasparian *	ARM	MF	1995	0	0	0	0	0	0	4	0	4	0	
Krzysztof; Gawara	POL	DF	1977–1982	110	1	10	2	0	0	0	0	120	3	
Waldemar; Gaworkiewicz	POL	FW	1959	4	0	0	0	0	0	0	0	4	0	
Marcin; Gąsiorowski	POL	DF	1995–1999, 2003–2004	61	0	11	1	0	0	29	1	101	2	
Krystian; Gergella	POL	MF	1993	3	0	2	1	0	0	0	0	5	1	
Gerson	BRA	DF	2015–2018	35	2	2	0	0	0	3	0	40	2	
Mariusz; Giergiel	POL	GK	1996–1999	18	0	2	0	0	0	0	0	20	0	
Łukasz; Giermasiński	POL	MF	2005	7	0	0	0	0	0	0	0	7	0	
Michał; Giliga	POL	MF	2001–2002	15	7	4	0	0	0	0	0	19	7	
Bartłomiej; Giruć	POL	FW	2002–2003	14	3	3	0	0	0	0	0	17	3	
Mirosław; Giruć	POL	FW	1989–1994	150	13	6	1	0	0	1	0	157	14	
Józef; Gładysz	POL	DF	1970–1982	221	9	10	0	0	0	0	0	231	9	
Dariusz; Gładyś	POL	GK	1992–1996	82	0	4	0	0	0	12	0	98	0	
Andrzej; Głąbiński	POL	GK	1980–1982	35	0	4	0	0	0	0	0	39	0	
**Michał**; **Głogowski**	POL	MF	2024–	21	1	1	0	0	0	0	0	22	1	
Dariusz; Głos	POL	MF	1993–1997	57	8	4	0	0	0	0	0	61	8	
Mirosław; Głos	POL	MF	1975–1977	18	0	1	0	0	0	0	0	19	0	
Andrzej; Głownia	POL	FW	1969–1980	205	25	12	3	0	0	0	0	217	28	
Andrzej; Golecki ‡	POL	MF	1998–2000	65	6	4	0	0	0	0	0	69	6	
José; Gomes	GNB; POR	FW	2020	12	1	2	1	0	0	0	0	14	2	
Leszek; Goździk	POL	FW	1947–1955	85	26	9	4	0	0	34	22	128	52	
Leszek; Góralski	POL	DF	1989–1994	120	4	2	0	0	0	0	0	122	4	
Józef; Górny	POL	FW	1956	19	0	1	1	0	0	0	0	20	1	
Grzegorz; Górski	POL	DF	1991, 1993–1995	21	0	1	0	0	0	0	0	22	0	
Jerzy; Górski	POL	DF	1969–1979	191	2	10	0	0	0	0	0	201	2	
Krzysztof; Górski	POL	FW	1982–1983	30	7	5	1	1	0	0	0	36	8	
Adam; Grad †	POL	FW	1995–1996	21	2	1	0	0	0	0	0	22	1	
Józef; Grad	POL	FW	1952	0	0	4	0	0	0	0	0	4	0	
Jacek; Grembocki	POL	DF	1982–1986, 1995–1997	134	23	10	0	2	0	6	0	152	23	
Piotr; Gronek *	POL	MF	1995–1996	0	0	1	0	0	0	13	1	14	1	
Andrzej; Gronowski	POL	MF	1974–1975, 1977	16	0	4	0	0	0	0	0	20	0	
Henryk; Gronowski	POL	GK	1949–1961, 1963–1969	246	0	25	0	0	0	5	0	276	0	
Jakub; Gronowski	POL	FW	2003–2004, 2005	28	1	1	2	0	0	0	0	29	3	
Robert; Gronowski	POL	FW	1949–1958	160	55	21	3	0	0	5	1	186	59	
Zygmunt; Gross	POL	MF	1956–1957	22	0	2	0	0	0	0	0	24	0	
Piotr; Grudzień	POL	MF	1998–2000	6	1	2	0	0	0	0	0	8	1	
Grzegorz; Grzegorczyk	POL	DF	2001	6	1	2	0	0	0	0	0	8	1	
Piotr; Grzelczak	POL	FW	2012–2015	80	11	5	1	0	0	9	3	94	15	
Grzenek	POL	FW	1966	0	0	1	0	0	0	0	0	1	0	
Loup-Diwan; Gueho	FRA	DF	2024–2025	22	0	1	0	0	0	0	0	23	0	
Andreu; Guerao	SPA	MF	2012	8	0	2	0	0	0	3	0	13	0	
Benedykt; Gumowski	POL	FW	1955–1956	1	0	1	0	0	0	0	0	2	0	
Eligiusz; Gwoździński	POL	FW	1945	0	0	0	0	0	0	2	1	2	1	
Austin; Hamlet ‡	NGA	FW	1998	6	1	2	0	0	0	0	0	8	1	
Lukáš; Haraslín	SVK	MF	2015–2019	108	12	11	4	2	0	1	2	122	18	
Marek; Hartman	POL	FW	1965–1969	74	24	1	0	0	0	0	0	75	24	
Omran; Haydary	AFG	MF	2020–2022	26	3	2	1	0	0	8	3	36	7	
Levon; Hayrapetyan	ARM	DF	2011–2012	38	0	3	0	0	0	0	0	41	0	
Tadeusz; Henning	POL	MF	1981–1982	5	1	0	0	0	0	0	0	5	1	
Robert; Hirsz	POL	MF	2006–2010	24	0	9	0	0	0	14	1	47	1	
Tadeusz; Hogendorf	POL	FW	1945–1946	3	2	0	0	0	0	4	5	7	7	
Andrzej; Ililkiewicz	POL	GK	1961–1964	14	0	0	0	0	0	0	0	14	0	
Jerzy; Jabłoński	POL	MF	1980–1982	26	2	3	0	0	0	0	0	29	3	
Piotr; Jacyna ‡	POL	DF	2000	13	0	2	1	0	0	0	0	15	1	
Aleksander; Jagiełło	POL	MF	2014	3	0	0	0	0	0	10	0	13	0	
Tadeusz; Jahn	POL	MF	1967–1976	121	8	8	0	0	0	0	0	129	8	
Ryszard; Jakubiak	POL	MF	1967	2	0	0	0	0	0	0	0	2	0	
Janusz; Jakuszewski	POL	MF	1964–1965	3	0	0	0	0	0	0	0	3	0	
Ryszard; Janecki	POL	FW	1950	5	4	1	0	0	0	0	0	6	4	
Rafał; Janicki	POL	DF	2010–2017	176	4	9	0	0	0	14	2	199	6	
Marcin; Janus	POL	DF	1995, 2005–2006	38	2	0	0	0	0	0	0	38	2	
Kazimierz; Januszewski	POL	MF	1945–1947	3	2	0	0	0	0	9	10	12	12	
Waldemar; Jarczyk	POL	MF	1955	16	2	2	0	0	0	0	0	18	2	
Rafał; Jary	POL	MF	2001–2002	1	2	1	0	0	0	0	0	2	2	
Stanisław; Jarząbek	POL	DF	1958, 1961	16	0	0	0	0	0	0	0	16	0	
Daniel; Jasiński	POL	MF	2004	2	0	2	0	0	0	0	0	4	0	
Jerzy; Jastrzębowski	POL	MF	1967–1974	87	23	2	1	0	0	0	0	89	24	
Stefan; Jatajski	POL	FW	1950	0	0	1	0	0	0	0	0	1	0	
**Alvis**; **Jaunzems**	LVA	DF	2025–	9	0	1	0	0	0	0	0	10	0	
Artur; Jażdżewski ‡	POL	GK	2002	3	0	1	0	0	0	0	0	4	0	
Dawid; Jędrzejak	POL	MF	2004	4	0	2	0	0	0	0	0	6	0	
Roman; Józefowicz	POL	FW	1979–1984	48	4	9	1	1	0	0	0	58	5	
Julcimar ‡	BRA	DF	1998	6	0	2	0	0	0	0	0	8	0	
Bartosz; Jurkowski	POL	DF	2008	3	0	0	0	0	0	0	0	3	0	
Łukasz; Kacprzycki	POL	FW	2011–2013	13	0	1	0	0	0	35	3	49	3	
Rafał; Kaczmarczyk	POL	MF	1988–1994	127	12	6	6	0	0	2	1	135	19	
Andrzej; Kaczmarek	POL	DF	1969–1974	98	5	3	0	0	0	0	0	101	5	
Bogusław; Kaczmarek	POL	DF	1975–1977	54	7	3	0	0	0	0	0	57	7	
Marcin; Kaczmarek (1974)	POL	MF	1990–1994, 2003–2004	93	22	6	3	0	0	0	0	99	25	
Marcin; Kaczmarek (1979)	POL	MF	2008–2010	59	3	9	0	0	0	2	0	70	3	
Ryszard; Kaczmarek	POL	DF	1963, 1967	6	0	0	0	0	0	0	0	6	0	
Zbigniew; Kaczmarek ‡	POL	DF	1998	12	0	3	0	0	0	0	0	15	0	
Jerzy; Kaleta	POL	DF	1952–1960	141	1	20	2	0	0	0	0	161	3	
Maciej; Kalkowski	POL	MF	1992–1996; 2004–2010	165	22	13	2	0	0	36	4	214	28	
Marcin; Kaliński ‡	POL	FW	2001	9	1	0	0	0	0	0	0	9	1	
Miłosz; Kałahur	POL	DF	2016, 2023–2026	60	0	5	0	0	0	10	0	75	0	
Jakub; Kałuziński	POL	MF	2020–2023	56	1	7	2	4	0	9	3	76	6	
Robert; Kałużny	POL	FW	2004	0	0	1	0	0	0	0	0	1	0	
Maciej; Kaminski	POL	MF	1983–1989	162	19	7	1	2	0	9	3	181	23	
Joeri de Kamps	NED	MF	2022–2023	10	0	1	0	0	0	0	0	11	0	
Alfred; Kamzela	POL	MF	1946–1955	80	3	14	1	0	0	28	1	122	5	
Bartosz; Kaniecki	POL	GK	2012–2014	9	0	1	0	0	0	8	0	18	0	
Lech; Kaniszewski	POL	FW	2001–2002	27	9	7	1	0	0	0	0	34	10	
**Rifet**; **Kapić**	BIH	MF	2023–	96	12	5	0	0	0	0	0	101	12	
Paweł; Kapsa	POL	GK	2007–2011	84	0	16	0	0	0	3	0	103	0	
Ryszard; Karbowniczek	POL	DF	1992	8	0	2	0	0	0	0	0	10	0	
**Adam**; **Kardaś**	POL	MF	2023–2026	3	0	1	0	0	0	0	0	4	0	
Jerzy; Kasalik	POL	FW	1975–1976	21	2	0	0	0	0	0	0	21	2	
Piotr; Kasperkiewicz	POL	MF	2007–2009	26	2	12	0	0	0	0	0	38	2	
Piotr; Kasperski ‡	POL	MF	2001	13	0	0	0	0	0	0	0	13	0	
Kaszewski	POL	FW	1950	0	0	1	0	0	0	0	0	1	0	
Jakub; Kawa	POL	MF	2004–2009; 2011, 2014	7	1	6	0	0	0	15	1	28	2	
Bogdan; Kazojć	POL	FW	1977, 1981–1982	9	0	3	0	0	0	0	0	12	0	
Donatas; Kazlauskas	LIT	MF	2015	1	0	0	0	0	0	6	2	7	2	
Roland; Kazubowski	POL	FW	2004–2005, 2007	27	6	1	0	0	0	0	0	28	6	
Roman; Kempiński	POL	GK	1988–1989	8	0	0	0	0	0	0	0	8	0	
Bogdan; Kędzia	POL	DF	1964–1971	78	1	3	0	0	0	0	0	81	1	
Sargis; Khachatryan	ARM	FW	1993	12	0	2	1	0	0	0	0	14	1	
Arsen; Khanamiryan	ARM	FW	1995	5	0	0	0	0	0	0	0	5	0	
Maksym; Khlan	UKR	MF	2023–2025	54	14	1	0	0	0	0	0	55	14	
Karol; Kierysz	POL	FW	1946	3	0	0	0	0	0	0	0	3	0	
Michał; Kiszkiel	POL	DF	2002	11	0	1	0	0	0	0	0	12	0	
Marcin; Klaczka ‡	POL	DF	2000	16	1	1	0	0	0	0	0	17	1	
Piotr; Klecha	POL	GK	1994	1	0	1	0	0	0	0	0	2	0	
Adrian; Klimowicz ‡	POL	FW	2001	7	2	1	0	0	0	0	0	8	2	
Jaroslaw; Klimowicz	POL	MF	1975–1977, 1980	19	1	3	0	0	0	0	0	22	1	
Jarosław; Klinger	POL	MF	1981–1983	36	2	8	0	0	0	0	0	44	2	
Stefan; Kliński	POL	DF	1978–1979	17	0	2	0	0	0	0	0	19	0	
Henryk; Kliszewicz	POL	FW	1975–1979	109	13	9	3	0	0	0	0	118	16	
Bartłomiej; Kłudka	POL	DF	2025–2026	18	0	1	0	0	0	0	0	19	0	
Rafał; Kobryń	POL	DF	2018–2022	9	0	3	0	0	0	12	2	24	2	
Zbigniew; Kobus	POL	FW	2003	12	12	0	0	0	0	0	0	12	12	
Alfred; Kobylański	POL	FW	1955–1957	38	7	6	4	0	0	0	0	44	11	
Martin; Kobylański	POL	MF	2016	3	0	0	0	0	0	3	2	6	2	
Alfred; Kokot	POL	FW	1946–1953	82	27	13	3	0	0	33	20	128	50	
Henryk; Kokot	POL	MF	1946–1952	48	12	11	0	0	0	27	8	86	20	
Piotr; Koliński	POL	DF	1981	8	0	0	0	0	0	0	0	8	0	
Arkadiusz; Kołodziej	POL	DF	1995–1997	1	0	0	0	0	0	8	0	9	0	
Edward; Kołodziej	POL	DF	1974–1976	46	1	3	0	0	0	0	0	49	1	
Andrzej; Konopek	POL	MF	1949	6	0	0	0	0	0	0	0	6	0	
Bartosz; Kopacz	POL	DF	2020–2021	43	2	5	0	0	0	0	0	48	2	
Dariusz; Kopeć	POL	DF	1981	1	0	0	0	0	0	0	0	1	0	
Filip; Koperski	POL	MF	2020–2025	20	1	4	1	2	0	9	1	35	3	
Roman; Korynt	POL	DF	1953–1968	327	9	11	0	0	0	2	0	340	9	
Tomasz; Korynt	POL	FW	1972–1977	102	33	7	3	0	0	0	0	109	36	
Bartłomiej; Korzeniewski ‡	POL	DF	1999	0	0	1	1	0	0	0	0	1	1	
Jakub; Kosecki	POL	MF	2012	8	2	0	0	0	0	0	0	8	2	
Rainer; Kostka	POL	MF	1963	2	0	0	0	0	0	0	0	2	0	
Maciej; Kostrzewa	POL	MF	2011–2014	16	0	1	0	0	0	29	1	46	1	
Artur; Koszczyński *	POL	MF	1996	0	0	0	0	0	0	9	0	9	0	
Rafał; Kosznik	POL	DF	2006–2010	74	1	9	0	0	0	3	0	86	1	
Aleksandar; Kovačević	SRB	MF	2015–2017	32	3	2	0	0	0	0	0	34	3	
Kowalik	POL	FW	1947	0	0	0	0	0	0	1	0	1	0	
Kamil; Kowalczyk	POL	MF	1995–1996	16	1	1	0	0	0	0	0	17	1	
Maciej; Kowalczyk	POL	FW	2008–2010	38	3	7	1	0	0	8	7	53	11	
Marek; Kowalczyk	POL	MF	1981–1986	100	16	8	3	2	1	6	0	116	20	
Marek; Kowalski	POL	DF	2001–2005	13	0	7	0	0	0	0	0	20	0	
Zbigniew; Kowalski	POL	MF	1977–1984	79	6	7	0	2	0	0	0	88	6	
Maciej; Kozak	POL	GK	1990–2001	203	0	10	0	0	0	0	0	213	0	
Władysław; Kozimor	POL	MF	1966, 1968	13	2	2	1	0	0	0	0	15	3	
Igor; Kozioł	POL	DF	1995–1996	22	0	1	0	0	0	0	0	23	0	
Robert; Kozioła ‡	POL	MF	2000	0	0	2	0	0	0	0	0	2	0	
Sergejs; Kožans	LVA	DF	2009–2012	42	1	8	0	0	0	4	0	54	1	
Zbigniew; Krawczyk	POL	MF	1976–1979	68	7	3	1	0	0	0	0	71	3	
Janusz; Krajewski	POL	GK	1977–1979	1	0	1	0	0	0	0	0	2	0	
Mirosław; Krajewski	POL	DF	1984–1985	10	0	0	0	0	0	0	0	10	0	
Miloš; Krasić	SRB	MF	2015–2018	86	7	5	3	0	0	5	0	96	10	
Grzegorz; Król	POL	FW	1994–1996, 2006	83	16	4	3	0	0	0	0	87	19	
Julius; Kruszankin †	POL	DF	1996	4	0	0	0	0	0	0	0	4	0	
Jerzy; Kruszczyński	POL	FW	1983–1985, 1989–1990	66	42	2	2	2	1	1	0	71	45	
Zbigniew; Kruszyński	POL	MF	1974–1975	1	0	1	0	0	0	0	0	2	0	
Egzon; Kryeziu	SLO	MF	2020–2022	17	0	2	0	0	0	9	6	28	6	
Grzegorz; Krysiak ‡	POL	DF	2000	14	1	0	0	0	0	0	0	14	1	
Tomasz; Krystek	POL	GK	1953	1	0	0	0	0	0	0	0	1	0	
Tadeusz; Krystyniak	POL	DF	1981	31	3	3	0	0	0	0	0	34	3	
Jarosław; Kubicki	POL	MF	2018–2023	151	9	19	1	5	0	0	0	175	10	
Łukasz; Kubik	POL	MF	2006	3	0	0	0	0	0	0	0	3	0	
Łukasz; Kubiński	POL	GK	2007	2	0	0	0	0	0	0	0	2	0	
Marcin; Kubsik	POL	DF	1993–2000	195	13	10	1	0	0	0	0	205	14	
Dušan; Kuciak	SVK	GK	2017–2024	196	0	7	0	6	0	1	0	207	0	
Maciej; Kudrycki ‡	POL	GK	1999	12	0	0	0	0	0	0	0	12	0	
Damian; Kugiel	POL	FW	2011–2014	4	0	0	0	0	0	39	13	43	13	
Robert; Kugiel ‡	POL	GK	1998–2002	113	23	9	2	0	0	0	0	122	25	
Marek; Kujach	POL	GK	1991	1	0	1	0	0	0	0	0	2	0	
Leszek; Kultys	POL	DF	1982	2	0	0	0	0	0	0	0	2	0	
Lech; Kulwicki	POL	DF	1977–1985	193	6	18	0	2	0	0	0	213	6	
Robert; Kunikowski	POL	DF	1961–1968	46	0	2	0	0	0	0	0	48	0	
Aleksander; Kupcewicz	POL	FW	1946–1957	87	30	18	3	0	0	25	13	130	46	
Janusz; Kupcewicz	POL	MF	1986–1988	39	8	3	1	0	0	4	0	46	9	
Zbigniew; Kupcewicz	POL	FW	1971–1973	20	4	1	1	0	0	0	0	21	5	
Wojciech; Kupiec ‡	POL	DF	2002	7	0	0	0	0	0	0	0	7	0	
Jan; Kurka	POL	DF	1960, 1962, 1964	6	1	0	0	0	0	0	0	6	1	
Dawid; Kurminowski	POL	FW	2025–2026	23	3	3	0	0	0	0	0	26	3	
Hubert; Kusz	POL	DF	1949–1960	171	2	8	0	0	0	3	0	182	2	
Grzegorz; Kuświk	POL	FW	2015–2018	79	19	0	0	0	0	0	0	79	19	
Leszek; Kwaśniewicz	POL	GK	1976–1978	75	0	4	0	0	0	0	0	79	0	
Jerzy; Kwapisiewicz	POL	FW	1962–1964, 1966–1968	14	2	0	0	0	0	0	0	14	2	
Zygmunt; Kwiatkowski	POL	FW	1962–1964	5	0	0	0	0	0	0	0	5	0	
Oļegs; Laizāns	LVA	MF	2010	8	1	3	0	0	0	0	0	11	1	
Stefan; Lasota	POL	DF	1945	0	0	0	0	0	0	1	0	1	0	
Michał; Latos ‡	POL	DF	2002	3	0	0	0	0	0	0	0	3	0	
Nikola; Leković	SRB	DF	2014–2015	35	1	3	0	0	0	9	1	47	2	
Czesław; Lenc	POL	DF	1949–1962	208	2	18	2	0	0	7	0	233	4	
Piotr; Leszczyk	POL	MF	1997	8	0	0	0	0	0	0	0	8	0	
Mateusz; Lewandowski	POL	DF	2017–2019	12	0	2	0	0	0	12	2	26	2	
Maciej; Lewna	POL	MF	1996–2001	74	11	3	0	0	0	0	0	77	11	
Jerzy; Licbarski	POL	GK	1969	1	0	0	0	0	0	0	0	1	0	
Zbigniew; Liedtke	POL	FW	1981–1982, 1984	28	1	1	0	0	0	0	0	29	1	
Patryk; Lipski	POL	MF	2017–2020	59	7	8	1	2	1	4	2	73	11	
Rafał; Loda	POL	DF	2004, 2006, 2009	3	0	1	0	0	0	10	0	14	0	
Luberski	POL	MF	1970	1	0	0	0	0	0	0	0	1	0	
Bogdan; Ludyga	POL	GK	1979	2	0	0	0	0	0	0	0	2	0	
Ivans; Lukjanovs	LVA	FW	2009–2012	77	5	11	2	0	0	1	1	89	8	
Kacper; Łazaj	POL	FW	2012–2014	11	1	0	0	0	0	30	6	41	7	
Grzegorz; Łazarek	POL	MF	1985–1988	48	1	3	0	0	0	4	0	55	1	
Wojciech; Łazarek	POL	MF	1967–1970	35	16	0	0	0	0	0	0	35	16	
Marian; Łącz	POL	FW	1945–1946	5	13	0	0	0	0	5	12	10	25	
Ludwik; Łoś	POL	GK	1945–1948	6	1	0	0	0	0	0	0	6	1	
Dariusz; Łożyński	POL	DF	2007	13	0	1	0	0	0	0	0	14	0	
Janusz; Łuczak	POL	GK	1961	1	0	0	0	0	0	0	0	1	0	
Mateusz; Łuczak	POL	MF	2008–2011	3	0	3	0	0	0	31	5	37	5	
Marek; Ługowski	POL	DF	1985–1994	258	13	9	0	0	0	6	1	273	14	
Krzysztof; Łukasiewicz	POL	DF	1989	4	0	0	0	0	0	0	0	4	0	
Waldemar; Łukasik	POL	DF	1957–1958, 1960–1962	29	0	1	0	0	0	0	0	30	0	
Daniel; Łukasik	POL	MF	2014–2019	128	2	10	1	2	0	7	1	147	4	
Mariusz; Łukowski	POL	MF	2003–2004	20	0	4	0	0	0	0	0	24	0	
Gerard; Mach	POL	MF	1946	3	2	0	0	0	0	0	0	3	2	
Mateusz; Machaj	POL	MF	2011–2014	47	3	4	0	0	0	10	3	61	6	
**Wojciech**; **Madej**	POL	DF	2026–	0	0	0	0	0	0	0	0	0	0	
Sebastian; Madera	POL	DF	2012–2014	44	3	5	1	0	0	3	0	52	4	
Andrzej; Magowski †	POL	MF	1995	1	0	0	0	0	0	0	0	1	0	
Waldemar; Majcher	POL	FW	1977–1981	47	1	5	0	0	0	0	0	52	1	
Michał; Mak	POL	FW	2015–2019	47	8	5	2	0	0	5	3	57	13	
Janusz; Makowski	POL	DF	1970–1971, 1974–1981	194	9	15	2	0	0	0	0	209	11	
Tomasz; Makowski	POL	MF	2015–2022	84	2	16	3	2	0	17	2	119	7	
Marian; Maksymiuk	POL	MF	1961–1973	168	29	7	1	0	0	0	0	175	30	
Maciej; Makuszewski	POL	MF	2014–2015	70	12	5	1	0	0	0	0	75	13	
Filip; Malbašić	SRB	MF	2014–2015	3	0	0	0	0	0	6	0	9	0	
Mario; Maloča	CRO	DF	2015–2018; 2019–2023	160	6	10	0	4	0	1	0	175	6	
Zenon; Małek	POL	DF	1984–1985	29	1	1	0	0	0	5	1	35	2	
Sebastian; Małkowski	POL	GK	2008–2013	36	0	9	0	0	0	30	0	75	0	
Tadeusz; Małolepszy	POL	MF	1977	0	0	1	0	0	0	0	0	1	0	
Jacek; Manuszewski	POL	MF	2006–2009	100	1	10	0	0	0	1	0	111	1	
Andrzej; Marchel	POL	DF	1981–1992	216	10	15	2	2	0	3	0	236	12	
Marko; Marić	CRO	GK	2015–2016	24	0	1	0	0	0	0	0	25	0	
Neven; Marković	SRB	DF	2015–2016	5	0	1	0	0	0	7	1	13	1	
Zbigniew; Masiak	POL	DF	1959–1960	15	0	0	0	0	0	0	0	15	0	
Krzysztof; Materek	POL	DF	2001	2	0	1	0	0	0	0	0	3	0	
Zdzisław; Matlak	POL	MF	1946	1	0	0	0	0	0	0	0	1	0	
Mateusz; Matras	POL	MF	2017	7	1	1	0	0	0	0	0	8	1	
Daisuke; Matsui	JPN	MF	2013	16	4	2	0	0	0	0	0	18	4	
Sławomir; Matuk	POL	DF	1989–1998, 2003–2004	194	3	10	1	0	0	0	0	204	4	
Krzysztof; Matuszewski	POL	FW	1974–1980, 1982	132	29	8	4	0	0	0	0	140	33	
Egy; Maulana Vikri	IDN	MF	2018–2021	10	0	1	0	0	0	23	17	34	17	
Michał; Mekler	POL	MF	1996–1997	7	0	1	0	0	0	0	0	8	0	
Zbigniew; Meloch	POL	MF	1991	0	0	1	0	0	0	0	0	1	0	
Janusz; Melaniuk	POL	MF	2001–2005	68	22	11	3	0	0	0	0	79	25	
**Camilo**; **Mena**	COL	MF	2023–	85	14	1	0	0	0	0	0	86	14	
Adam; Merchut	POL	DF	1995–1996, 1999	4	0	1	0	0	0	20	0	25	0	
Tomasz; Meyer	POL	FW	1997	4	0	0	0	0	0	0	0	4	0	
Krzysztof; Miałk	POL	FW	1979	2	0	0	0	0	0	0	0	2	0	
Konrad; Michalak	POL	MF	2018–2019	22	1	4	0	0	0	1	0	27	1	
Piotr; Michalczak	POL	FW	1986–1989	28	2	0	0	0	0	0	0	28	2	
Tomasz; Michalski ‡	POL	DF	1998–2001	66	0	8	0	0	0	0	0	74	0	
Zdzisław; Michalski	POL	MF	1965	6	1	1	1	0	0	0	0	7	2	
Daniel; Michalczuk ‡	POL	DF	2002	2	0	0	0	0	0	0	0	2	0	
Tomasz; Midzierski	POL	DF	2008–2009	15	0	8	1	0	0	2	1	25	2	
Marcin; Mięciel	POL	FW	1993	10	0	2	0	0	0	0	0	12	0	
Jaroslav; Mihalík	SVK	MF	2019–2020	26	3	5	0	0	0	2	3	33	6	
Arkadiusz; Miklosik	POL	MF	2007–2008	43	1	4	0	0	0	0	0	47	1	
Tadeusz; Miksa	POL	DF	1952–1953	30	1	13	0	0	0	0	0	43	1	
Antoni; Mikułko	POL	GK	2021–2024	3	0	2	0	0	0	19	0	24	0	
Sebastian; Mila	POL	MF	2000–2001, 2015–2017	88	8	6	0	0	0	0	0	94	8	
Dariusz; Milbrodt	POL	MF	1992	5	1	0	0	0	0	0	0	5	1	
Vanja; Milinković-Savić	SRB	GK	2016	29	0	0	0	0	0	0	0	29	0	
Janusz; Miller	POL	FW	1985–1986	27	1	1	0	0	0	3	0	31	1	
Mato; Miloš	CRO	DF	2017–2018	14	0	0	0	0	0	0	0	14	0	
Grzegorz; Miłkowski	POL	DF	1995–2001	149	6	8	0	0	0	0	0	157	6	
Henrique; Miranda	BRA	DF	2014	1	0	0	0	0	0	0	0	1	0	
Janusz; Mirowski	POL	FW	1966–1967	9	0	1	1	0	0	0	0	10	1	
Filip; Mladenović	SRB	DF	2018–2020	74	3	10	0	2	0	0	0	86	3	
Robert; Morka	POL	DF	2003–2004	34	1	9	0	0	0	0	0	43	1	
Tomasz; Moskal ‡	POL	FW	2000	16	6	1	0	0	0	0	0	17	6	
Piotr; Mosór †	POL	DF	1996	16	1	0	0	0	0	0	0	16	1	
Grzegorz; Motyk	POL	DF	1991–1996, 2000	125	13	5	0	0	0	0	0	130	13	
Tomasz; Motyk	POL	DF	1991–1997	37	0	4	0	0	0	0	0	41	0	
Mateusz; Możdżeń	POL	DF	2014–2015	24	0	1	0	0	0	6	2	31	2	
Janusz; Możejko	POL	DF	1984–1985	48	3	2	0	0	0	5	1	55	4	
Arkadiusz; Mulinek ‡	POL	FW	1999	1	0	0	0	0	0	0	0	1	0	
Władysław; Musiał	POL	FW	1954–1964	204	29	6	1	0	0	2	0	212	30	
Mykola; Musolitin	UKR	DF	2021	7	0	1	0	0	0	7	1	15	1	
Marcin; Muszka	POL	GK	2002–2003	3	0	1	0	0	0	0	0	4	0	
Maciej; Mysiak	POL	DF	2005–2006	30	1	0	0	0	0	0	0	30	1	
Arkadiusz; Mysona	POL	DF	2008–2010	38	1	8	0	0	0	1	0	47	1	
Michał; Nalepa	POL	DF	2017–2023	152	12	19	2	5	0	0	0	176	14	
Bruno; Nazário	BRA	MF	2014–2015	35	1	1	0	0	0	7	1	43	2	
**Tomasz**; **Neugebauer**	POL	MF	2022–	93	13	6	1	0	0	6	0	105	14	
Wojciech; Niedźwiedzki	POL	GK	1971	0	0	1	0	0	0	0	0	1	0	
Piotr; Nierychło	POL	MF	1946–1952	46	2	4	0	0	0	27	0	77	2	
Krzysztof; Nosko	POL	MF	1980–1981	16	0	1	0	0	0	0	0	17	0	
Paweł; Nowak	POL	MF	2009–2012	80	7	13	1	0	0	9	2	102	10	
Sebastian; Nowak	POL	DF	1995–1996	19	2	1	0	0	0	0	0	20	2	
Wojciech; Nowak	POL	DF	1979–1980	4	0	0	0	0	0	0	0	4	0	
Ewald; Nowakowski	POL	MF	1963, 1965	7	0	0	0	0	0	0	0	7	0	
Hubert; Nowakowski	POL	DF	1945–1952	10	0	1	0	0	0	21	1	32	1	
Czesław; Nowicki	POL	MF	1951–1965	265	37	21	3	0	0	4	0	290	40	
Jarosław; Nowicki	POL	FW	1985–1989	108	13	5	1	0	0	7	1	120	15	
João; Nunes	POR	DF	2016–2019	76	0	6	0	0	0	1	0	83	0	
Bogusław; Oblewski	POL	DF	1984–1990	98	3	2	0	0	0	11	1	111	4	
João; Oliveira	SWI	MF	2017–2018	19	3	0	0	0	0	0	0	19	3	
Elias; Olsson	SWE	DF	2023–2026	70	3	4	0	0	0	0	0	74	3	
Walenty; Omelianiuk	POL	DF	1982–1983	12	0	3	0	0	0	0	0	15	0	
Paweł; Onych ‡	POL	DF	2002	15	0	0	0	0	0	0	0	15	0	
Grzegorz; Oprządek	POL	DF	1963–1967	42	4	1	0	0	0	0	0	43	1	
Piotr; Opuszewicz	POL	GK	2004	10	0	0	0	0	0	0	0	10	0	
Janusz; Orczykowski	POL	MF	1969, 1972–1974	52	10	3	0	0	0	0	0	55	10	
Maciej; Osłowski	POL	DF	2008–2010	0	0	4	0	0	0	4	0	8	0	
Piotr; Osmólski	POL	MF	2001	5	0	4	1	0	0	0	0	9	1	
Sebastian; Osmólski ‡	POL	MF	1998–1999, 2001–2002	11	0	2	2	0	0	0	0	13	2	
Christopher; Oualembo	DRC	DF	2012–2014	26	0	2	0	0	0	10	1	38	1	
Flávio; Paixão	POR	FW	2016–2023	239	84	21	6	6	5	2	1	268	96	
Marco; Paixão	POR	FW	2016–2018	66	34	2	0	0	0	0	0	68	34	
Gracjan; Pajor	POL	FW	2001	0	0	1	0	0	0	0	0	1	0	
Jerzy; Panek	POL	MF	1970–1971	14	9	0	0	0	0	0	0	14	9	
Jacek; Paszulewicz	POL	DF	1998	5	1	1	0	0	0	0	0	6	1	
Henryk; Patyk ‡	POL	DF	2001–2002	19	0	1	0	0	0	0	0	20	0	
Łukasz; Paulewicz	POL	FW	2001–2002	19	14	6	6	0	0	0	0	25	20	
Alex; Paulsen	NZL	GK	2025–2026	24	0	3	0	0	0	0	0	27	0	
Grzegorz; Pawelec	POL	MF	1989	9	0	0	0	0	0	0	0	9	0	
Mariusz; Pawlak	POL	MF	1989–1996, 2006–2007	218	14	8	0	0	0	2	1	228	15	
Bartłomiej; Pawłowski	POL	GK	2014–2016	18	0	3	2	0	0	5	3	26	5	
Wojciech; Pawłowski	POL	GK	2010–2012	16	0	1	0	0	0	24	0	92	19	
Grzegorz; Pawłuszek	POL	FW	1990–1992	88	18	4	1	0	0	0	0	92	19	
Dariusz; Pawski ‡	POL	DF	1999	8	0	0	0	0	0	0	0	8	0	
Adam; Pazio	POL	DF	1999	19	0	2	0	0	0	7	1	28	1	
Daniel; Pellowski	POL	DF	2001–2003	48	2	12	1	0	0	0	0	60	3	
Sławomir; Peszko	POL	MF	2015–2020	100	12	5	0	2	0	4	1	111	13	
Paweł; Pęczak	POL	DF	2005–2009	77	3	4	0	0	0	0	0	81	3	
Mirosław; Pękala	POL	FW	1985–1988	102	13	3	0	0	0	9	1	114	14	
Karol; Piątek	POL	MF	2000–2001; 2006–2010	108	12	20	0	0	0	2	0	130	12	
Marek; Piątek	POL	MF	1996–1997	18	1	1	0	0	0	12	2	31	3	
Sławomir; Piechota	POL	MF	1969	2	1	0	0	0	0	0	0	2	1	
Józef; Piekuta	POL	GK	1949	2	0	0	0	0	0	0	0	2	0	
Jacek; Pieniążek ‡	POL	DF	2001	8	0	0	0	0	0	0	0	8	0	
Sławomir; Pietkiewicz	POL	DF	1994–1995	24	2	2	0	0	0	0	0	26	2	
Łukasz; Pietroń	POL	MF	2005, 2008	0	0	6	1	0	0	0	0	6	1	
Michał; Pietroń	POL	MF	2004–2005	22	1	3	0	0	0	0	0	25	1	
Marcin; Pietrowski	POL	MF	2004–2015	168	5	21	0	0	0	13	5	202	10	
Tomasz; Piętka	POL	DF	1989–1995	154	10	3	0	0	0	0	0	157	10	
Rafał; Pietrzak	POL	DF	2020–2023	100	1	7	1	4	1	0	0	111	3	
Henryk; Pilarski	POL	FW	1951	5	0	0	0	0	0	2	0	7	0	
Krzysztof; Pilarz ‡	POL	GK	2000–2001	70	0	4	0	0	0	0	0	74	0	
Dominik; Piła	POL	MF	2022–2025	77	3	3	0	0	0	0	0	80	3	
Artur; Piłat *	POL	MF	1996	0	0	0	0	0	0	5	0	5	0	
Paweł; Piotrowski	POL	FW	2004–2005, 2008	0	0	3	1	0	0	0	0	3	1	
Ryszard; Piskor	POL	FW	1959–1960, 1963–1964	16	1	1	0	0	0	0	0	17	1	
Jan; Pistula	POL	FW	1950	5	1	0	0	0	0	0	0	5	1	
Zbigniew; Pisula	POL	GK	1972	14	0	0	0	0	0	0	0	14	0	
Robert; Piżewski	POL	MF	2002	11	2	0	0	0	0	0	0	11	2	
**Bujar**; **Pllana**	KOS	DF	2024–	44	2	2	0	0	0	0	0	46	2	
Alfred; Pochopień	POL	MF	1946	4	8	0	0	0	0	0	0	4	8	
Damian; Podleśny	POL	GK	2014–2016	2	0	2	0	0	0	9	0	13	0	
Piotr; Podolczak	POL	GK	1981–1982	7	0	1	0	0	0	0	0	8	0	
Józef; Pokorski	POL	GK	1946–1949	24	0	0	0	0	0	25	4	49	4	
Ryszard; Polak	POL	FW	1976–1979, 1982–1985	131	21	10	1	2	0	0	0	143	22	
Jakub; Popielarz	POL	MF	2010–2012	5	0	1	0	0	0	32	2	38	2	
Marcin; Potrykus	POL	GK	1952–1955	19	0	4	0	0	0	0	0	23	0	
Potrykwa	POL	FW	1952	0	0	1	0	0	0	0	0	1	0	
Kamil; Poźniak	POL	MF	2011–2012	16	0	5	0	0	0	5	0	26	0	
Piotr; Prabucki	POL	FW	1987–1989	53	7	2	0	0	0	4	1	59	8	
Paweł; Predehl	POL	FW	1991, 1999	7	1	1	0	0	0	0	0	8	0	
Dariusz; Preis ‡	POL	MF	2000–2001	34	6	5	1	0	0	0	0	39	7	
Henryk; Prośniewski	POL	MF	1974–1975	5	0	2	0	0	0	0	0	7	0	
Ryszard; Przygodzki	POL	MF	1986–1989	68	8	2	0	0	0	4	1	74	9	
Marcin; Pudysiak	POL	MF	1997–1998	41	3	0	0	0	0	0	0	41	3	
Zdzisław; Puszkarz	POL	MF	1968–1981, 1987–1988	326	55	14	5	0	0	2	1	342	61	
Dariusz; Raczyński	POL	MF	1980–1985	98	7	11	2	1	0	1	0	111	9	
Boris; Radovanović	CRO	DF	2008–2009	1	0	5	0	0	0	0	0	6	0	
Mariusz; Radoń	POL	MF	2004–2005	26	1	2	0	0	0	0	0	28	1	
Leonard; Radowski	POL	FW	1974–1980	129	22	6	6	0	0	0	0	135	28	
Piotr; Rafalski	POL	DF	2007	1	0	1	0	0	0	0	0	2	0	
Mohammed; Rahoui	ALG	MF	2013	3	0	6	1	0	0	0	0	9	1	
Piotr; Rajkiewicz	POL	DF	1996	25	1	1	0	0	0	0	0	26	1	
Mieczysław; Rajski	POL	FW	1964, 1970–1971	16	4	0	0	0	0	0	0	16	4	
Grzegorz; Rasiak	POL	FW	2012–2013	13	4	2	0	0	0	5	3	20	7	
Maciej; Rataj	POL	DF	2005	0	0	1	0	0	0	0	0	1	0	
Ricardinho	BRA	MF	2012–2013	27	7	1	0	0	0	1	1	29	8	
Jan; Richert	POL	DF	1949–1950	2	0	0	0	0	0	0	0	2	0	
Matej; Rodin	CRO	DF	2025–2026	26	1	0	0	0	0	0	0	26	1	
Józef; Rogacki	POL	FW	1967–1974	69	6	4	1	0	0	0	0	73	7	
Maciej; Rogalski	POL	MF	2007–2010	91	18	12	2	0	0	1	0	104	20	
Roman; Rogocz	POL	FW	1947–1960	143	77	6	0	0	0	19	32	168	109	
**Kacper**; **Rogoz**	POL	DF	2026–	0	0	0	0	0	0	0	0	0	0	
Arkadiusz; Rojek	POL	DF	1989–1990, 1994–1995	8	0	0	0	0	0	0	0	8	0	
Paweł; Rosiński	POL	DF	2009–2011	0	0	1	0	0	0	20	1	21	1	
Ryszard; Różański	POL	FW	1976–1977	0	0	2	0	0	0	0	0	2	0	
Krzysztof; Rusinek	POL	FW	2000–2001, 2004–2006	80	19	6	3	0	0	0	0	86	22	
Rafał; Ruta †	POL	MF	1996	15	1	2	0	0	0	0	0	15	1	
Andrzej; Rybski	POL	FW	2007–2009	53	9	11	0	0	0	2	4	15	1	
Robert; Rzeczycki ‡	POL	DF	1999	12	0	2	0	0	0	0	0	14	0	
Rafał; Rzepecki ‡	POL	FW	2002	8	2	0	0	0	0	0	0	8	2	
Tomasz; Rzepnikowski	POL	MF	1988–1989	9	0	1	0	0	0	0	0	10	0	
Mateusz; Rzeźnik	POL	FW	2023	1	0	0	0	0	0	0	0	1	0	
Zaur; Sadayev	RUS	FW	2014	16	3	2	0	0	0	2	0	20	3	
Krzysztof; Sadzawicki †	POL	DF	1995–1996	31	1	1	0	0	0	0	0	32	1	
Kenny; Saief	ISR; USA	MF	2020–2021	33	1	1	0	0	0	0	0	34	1	
Andrzej; Salach	POL	DF	1979–1994	303	19	23	1	2	0	9	0	337	20	
Jarosław; Sapiński	POL	FW	1997–1998	23	11	0	0	0	0	0	0	23	11	
Bohdan; Sarnavskyi	UKR	GK	2023–2026	46	0	1	0	0	0	0	0	47	0	
Saulo ‡	BRA	MF	1998	13	0	2	0	0	0	0	0	15	0	
Alyaksandr; Sazankow	BLR	FW	2010–2011	10	1	2	0	0	0	2	0	14	1	
Florian; Schikowski	POL	MF	2017–2018	4	0	1	0	0	0	3	2	8	2	
Wojciech; Sekuła	POL	DF	2000–2002, 2004	29	0	8	0	0	0	0	0	37	0	
Kacper; Sezonienko	POL	FW	2020–2026	136	12	8	1	4	0	4	1	152	14	
Marek; Sęk	POL	MF	1974–1977	63	1	1	0	0	0	0	0	64	1	
Henryk; Siedlecki	POL	MF	1967	1	0	0	0	0	0	0	0	1	0	
Robert; Sierpiński	POL	DF	1999, 2005	21	0	2	0	0	0	0	0	23	0	
Rudinilson; Silva	GNB	DF	2014–2016	5	0	2	0	0	0	38	0	45	0	
**Dorian**; **Sinkiewicz**	POL	FW	2026–	1	0	0	0	0	0	0	0	1	0	
Mauro Sérgio da Silva ‡	BRA	DF	2001	5	0	0	0	0	0	0	0	5	0	
Jerzy; Sionek	POL	MF	1964–1968	70	19	5	1	0	0	0	0	75	20	
Tomasz; Siwka	POL	FW	1978–1980	31	4	1	0	0	0	0	0	32	4	
Simeon; Slavchev	BUL	MF	2016–2018	50	1	0	0	0	0	0	0	50	1	
Krzysztof; Słabik	POL	GK	1962–1969	124	2	7	0	0	0	0	0	131	2	
Tomasz; Słabkowski	POL	DF	2001–2002	30	0	9	0	0	0	0	0	39	0	
Bartosz; Skierka ‡	POL	MF	1998–2002	128	4	12	1	0	0	0	0	140	5	
Kazimierz; Skowronek	POL	MF	1962	1	0	0	0	0	0	0	0	1	0	
Tadeusz; Skowroński	POL	FW	1946–1949	23	17	0	0	0	0	12	3	35	20	
Krzysztof; Skrzyński ‡	POL	GK	1998	11	0	1	0	0	0	0	0	12	0	
Dariusz; Skrzypczak	POL	FW	1997–1998	23	10	0	0	0	0	0	0	23	10	
Michał; Smarzyński	POL	MF	1997	17	0	0	0	0	0	0	0	17	0	
Bartłomiej; Smuczyński	POL	MF	2013	1	0	7	3	0	0	0	0	8	3	
Jakub; Smug	POL	DF	1947–1949	3	0	0	0	0	0	14	0	17	0	
Dominik; Sobański	POL	GK	2006–2008	12	0	4	0	0	0	0	0	16	0	
Karol; Sobczak	POL	MF	1990–1995	143	18	8	1	0	0	0	0	151	19	
Artur; Sobiech	POL	MF	2018–2019	44	13	7	3	2	0	1	0	54	16	
Bogdan; Sobiechowski	POL	MF	1977–1978	4	0	1	1	0	0	0	0	5	1	
Stanisław; Sobieralski	POL	DF	1980–1981	6	0	2	0	0	0	0	0	8	0	
Mateusz; Sopoćko	POL	MF	2018–2020	9	0	2	0	0	0	19	8	30	8	
Robert; Speichler	POL	MF	2007–2008	23	2	2	0	0	0	0	0	25	2	
Janusz; Stawarz	POL	GK	1985–1990	138	0	5	0	0	0	9	0	152	0	
Michał; Stachowiak	POL	FW	1991–1997	60	3	1	0	0	0	0	0	61	3	
Oskar; Stanek ‡	POL	MF	2001–2002	23	5	2	1	0	0	0	0	25	6	
Ben; Starosta	POL	DF	2002–2003	11	0	3	0	0	0	0	0	14	0	
Paweł; Staruszkiewicz	POL	DF	2002–2003	27	3	4	0	0	0	0	0	31	3	
Romuald; Steinmetz	POL	FW	1948	5	4	0	0	0	0	4	1	9	5	
David; Stec	AUT	DF	2022–2024	22	0	2	0	4	0	0	0	28	0	
Paweł; Stolarski	POL	DF	2014–2018	79	1	5	0	0	0	4	0	88	1	
Bartłomiej; Stolc	POL	FW	2001–2003	64	68	12	13	0	0	0	0	76	81	
Ryszard; Stoma	POL	FW	1979–1980	14	0	0	0	0	0	0	0	14	0	
Andrzej; Stretowicz	POL	FW	1997–1998	30	0	1	0	0	0	0	0	31	0	
Rafał; Stryganek	POL	FW	1994	1	0	0	0	0	0	0	0	1	0	
Jarosław; Studzizba	POL	MF	1979–1981	53	10	5	2	0	0	0	0	58	12	
Sławomir; Suchomski †	POL	MF	1995–1996	29	6	1	0	0	0	0	0	30	6	
Witan; Sulaeman	IDN	MF	2021–2022	0	0	0	0	0	0	4	0	4	0	
Jakub; Sumiła	POL	DF	1996	2	0	0	0	0	0	4	0	6	0	
Łukasz; Surma	POL	MF	2009–2013	125	6	12	1	0	0	0	0	137	7	
Jakub; Sypek	POL	MF	2023–2024	22	1	1	0	0	0	0	0	23	1	
Marcin; Szałęga	POL	MF	2006–2008	11	1	5	0	0	0	0	0	16	1	
**Bartosz**; **Szczepankiewicz**	POL	MF	2025–	1	0	1	0	0	0	0	0	2	0	
Miłosz; Szczepański	POL	MF	2021–2023	3	0	1	0	0	0	4	0	8	0	
Michał; Szczepiński	POL	MF	2005–2006	48	2	2	0	0	0	0	0	50	2	
Andrzej; Szczęsny	POL	MF	1970–1972, 1974	9	3	1	3	0	0	0	0	10	6	
Ryszard; Szewczyk	POL	DF	1985–1988	66	0	4	0	0	0	3	0	73	0	
Bronisław; Szlagowski	POL	FW	1957	11	6	0	0	0	0	0	0	11	6	
Tomasz; Szostek *	POL	FW	1995	0	0	1	0	0	0	8	1	9	1	
Jerzy; Szróbka	POL	DF	1961–1968	120	2	4	1	0	0	0	0	124	3	
Mieczysław; Sztuka	POL	GK	1962–1967	96	0	5	0	0	0	2	0	103	0	
Marcin; Szulik	POL	MF	2004–2007	39	0	0	0	0	0	0	0	39	0	
Damian; Szuprytowski	POL	MF	2008–2012	4	0	4	2	0	0	35	9	43	11	
Marek; Szutowicz	POL	MF	1996–1997, 2003–2004	51	33	7	5	0	0	0	0	58	38	
Jacek; Szydłowski *	POL	DF	1995	0	0	0	0	0	0	1	0	1	0	
Rafał; Szymański	POL	DF	1981	1	0	0	0	0	0	0	0	1	0	
Adam; Szymura ‡	POL	MF	1998–2002	34	0	4	1	0	0	0	0	38	1	
Ryszard; Szyndlar	POL	DF	1958–1963	113	1	2	0	0	0	2	0	117	1	
Łukasz; Świostek	POL	DF	2005	0	0	1	0	0	0	0	0	1	0	
Tadeusz; Świstak	POL	MF	1953	6	0	0	0	0	0	0	0	6	0	
Ronald; Šiklić	CRO	DF	2006	4	0	0	0	0	0	0	0	4	0	
Josip; Tadić	CRO	FW	2011–2012	11	0	1	0	0	0	1	0	13	0	
Adam; Tanecki ‡	POL	DF	2002	12	1	0	0	0	0	0	0	12	1	
Marco; Terrazzino	GER	MF	2021–2023	49	4	1	0	3	0	1	0	54	4	
Emmanuel; Tetteh †	GHA	FW	1995–1996	30	9	1	0	0	0	0	0	31	9	
Artur; Thomas *	POL	FW	1996	0	0	0	0	0	0	1	0	1	0	
Mirosław; Tłokiński	POL	FW	1975–1976	27	4	3	0	0	0	0	0	30	4	
Kristers; Tobers	LVA	DF	2020–2023	65	0	3	0	2	0	3	0	73	0	
Adam; Tokarz	POL	FW	1973–1974	13	0	2	2	0	0	0	0	15	2	
Dariusz; Trela	POL	GK	2014	9	0	0	0	0	0	0	0	9	0	
Damian; Trzebiński	POL	DF	2006–2007	18	0	2	0	0	0	0	0	20	0	
Piotr; Trafarski	POL	FW	2008–2009	1	0	1	0	0	0	0	0	2	0	
Łukasz; Trałka	POL	MF	2008	30	3	5	0	0	0	0	0	35	3	
Abdou Razack; Traoré	BFA	FW	2010–2012	64	25	8	2	0	0	0	0	72	27	
Anton; Tsarenko	UKR	MF	2024–2026	36	2	2	0	0	0	0	0	38	2	
Patryk; Tuszyński	POL	FW	2012–2014	33	6	4	1	0	0	22	7	59	14	
Krzysztof; Twardowski	POL	MF	1992–1993	10	0	1	0	0	0	0	0	11	0	
Zbigniew; Tymiński	POL	MF	1976	0	0	1	0	0	0	0	0	1	0	
Žarko; Udovičić	SRB	MF	2019–2021	23	3	5	0	2	0	4	0	34	3	
Tomasz; Unton	POL	MF	1988–1996	210	36	6	0	0	0	2	0	218	36	
Kacper; Urbański	POL	MF	2019–2020	4	0	2	1	0	0	6	1	12	2	
Przemysław; Urbański	POL	MF	2001–2004	71	21	17	3	0	0	2	0	88	24	
Stanisław; Uścinowicz	POL	GK	1957–1958, 1960–1961	22	0	0	0	0	0	0	0	22	0	
Tiago; Valente	POR	DF	2014–2015	12	0	0	0	0	0	16	3	28	3	
Gino van Kessel	NED; CUR	FW	2017	3	0	0	0	0	0	0	0	3	0	
Steven; Vitória	POR; CAN	DF	2016–2019	37	2	7	1	0	0	1	0	45	3	
Matúš; Vojtko	SVK	DF	2025–2026	31	1	1	0	0	0	0	0	32	1	
Stojan; Vranjes	BIH	MF	2014–2015	52	16	3	0	0	0	0	0	55	16	
Luka; Vučko	CRO	DF	2011–2012	33	2	5	0	0	0	2	0	40	2	
**Bohdan**; **Vyunnyk**	UKR	FW	2024–	57	9	4	0	0	0	0	0	61	9	
Marek; Walczak	POL	DF	1979	1	0	0	0	0	0	0	0	1	0	
Marcin; Waniuga	POL	FW	2001–2003	42	5	13	7	0	0	0	0	55	12	
Ryszard; Walkiewicz	POL	FW	1950, 1952–1953	1	0	2	0	0	0	0	0	3	0	
Marek; Wasicki	POL	FW	2001–2004	61	37	13	15	0	0	0	0	74	52	
Włodzimierz; Watras	POL	DF	1996–1997	12	0	1	0	0	0	0	0	13	0	
Mieczysław; Wawrzusiak	POL	MF	1949, 1952	17	4	3	2	0	0	0	0	20	6	
Wawrzyniak	POL	FW	1976	0	0	1	0	0	0	0	0	1	0	
Jakub; Wawrzyniak	POL	DF	2015–2018	98	0	4	0	0	0	0	0	102	0	
Daniel; Weber ‡	POL	DF	1999–2000	31	3	2	0	0	0	0	0	33	3	
**Karl**; **Wendt**	SWE	MF	2024–	13	1	1	0	0	0	0	0	14	1	
Mirosław; Weiner	POL	DF	1993	12	0	0	0	0	0	0	0	12	0	
Marek; Widzicki	POL	MF	1995–1996, 2001; 2003–2004	53	17	11	0	0	0	25	1	89	18	
Włodzimierz; Wieczorek	POL	MF	1986	1	0	1	0	0	0	0	0	2	0	
Henryk; Wieczorkowski	POL	FW	1957–1966	181	13	4	0	0	0	2	0	187	13	
**Szymon**; **Weirauch**	POL	GK	2024–	29	0	20	0	0	0	0	0	29	0	
Ferdynand; Wierzba	POL	GK	1969-1970, 1974- 1975, 1978-1981	55	0	7	0	0	0	0	0	62	0	
Edmund; Wierzyński	POL	DF	1961–1969	176	20	7	0	0	0	2	0	185	20	
Marcin; Wiewiórski ‡	POL	MF	2002	2	0	0	0	0	0	0	0	2	0	
Jakub; Wilk	POL	MF	2012	12	2	0	0	0	0	0	0	12	2	
Krzysztof; Wilk	POL	FW	2001–2003	41	23	9	4	0	0	0	0	50	27	
Piotr; Wilk	POL	MF	2005	11	0	0	0	0	0	0	0	11	0	
Robert; Wilk	POL	MF	1989–1990	43	4	1	0	0	0	0	0	44	4	
Jaroslaw; Wiśniewski	POL	MF	1980–1981	7	0	0	0	0	0	0	0	7	0	
Piotr; Wiśniewski	POL	MF	2005–2017	240	43	21	5	0	0	15	11	276	59	
Jakub; Wiszniewski	POL	DF	2001–2004	50	15	13	6	0	0	0	0	63	21	
Sebastian; Władacz *	POL	GK	1996	0	0	0	0	0	0	1	0	1	0	
Marcin; Włódarczyk ‡	POL	DF	1999	6	1	0	0	0	0	0	0	6	1	
Dariusz; Wojciechowski ‡	POL	MF	2001	13	4	0	0	0	0	0	0	13	4	
Mariusz; Wojciechowski	POL	MF	1986	6	0	0	0	0	0	0	0	6	0	
Sławomir; Wojciechowski	POL	MF	1988–1993, 2004–2007	145	26	4	1	0	0	1	0	150	27	
Piotr; Wojdyga †	POL	GK	1995–1996	22	0	0	0	0	0	0	0	22	0	
**Tomasz**; **Wójtowicz**	POL	MF	2024–	55	1	3	0	0	0	0	0	58	1	
Grzegorz; Wojtkowiak	POL	DF	2015–2019	73	3	7	1	0	0	21	0	101	4	
Andrzej; Wolański	POL	FW	1951–1952	0	0	2	0	0	0	2	1	4	1	
Rafał; Wolski	POL	MF	2016–2019	70	5	7	1	1	0	2	2	80	8	
Hubert; Wołąkiewicz	POL	DF	2007–2010	99	5	12	1	0	0	0	0	111	6	
Paweł; Woronowicz	POL	DF	2001–2002	8	0	1	0	0	0	0	0	9	0	
Radoslaw; Woszczyna	POL	DF	2001–2002	8	2	6	0	0	0	0	0	14	2	
Janusz; Woźniak	POL	GK	1971	1	0	0	0	0	0	0	0	1	0	
Marek; Woźniak	POL	GK	1981–1986, 1988	53	0	2	0	0	0	4	0	59	0	
Karol; Wójcik	POL	MF	2001	2	0	1	0	0	0	0	0	3	0	
Marcin; Wojtkiewicz	POL	DF	2007–2008	1	0	3	0	0	0	0	0	4	0	
Dariusz; Wójtowicz	POL	MF	1967–1952	70	6	4	0	2	0	6	0	82	6	
Zbigniew; Wójtowicz	POL	DF	1967	3	0	0	0	0	0	0	0	3	0	
Andrzej; Wszoła	POL	DF	1967	1	0	0	0	0	0	0	0	1	0	
Andrzej; Wydrowski	POL	FW	1981–1985	28	0	3	0	0	0	1	0	32	0	
Janusz; Wydrowski	POL	FW	1981–1984	7	0	0	0	0	0	0	0	7	0	
Marcin; Wyrożębski	POL	FW	1995	1	0	0	0	0	0	0	0	1	0	
Jakub; Zabłocki	POL	FW	2009–2010	22	3	3	0	0	0	13	9	38	12	
**Miłosz**; **Zaborowski**	POL	DF	2026–	0	0	0	0	0	0	0	0	0	0	
Jarosław; Zadylak	POL	DF	1996–1997	17	0	0	0	0	0	0	0	17	0	
Piotr; Zagórski ‡	POL	FW	1999–2002	15	2	1	0	0	0	0	0	16	2	
Wacław; Zaremba	POL	MF	1968–1970	5	1	0	0	0	0	0	0	5	1	
Marek; Zawada	POL	FW	1997, 2001	29	3	0	0	0	0	0	0	29	3	
Oliver; Zelenika	CRO	GK	2018	1	0	0	0	0	0	0	0	1	0	
Jakub; Zejglic	POL	FW	2010–2011	4	0	0	0	0	0	29	5	33	5	
Maciej; Zezula ‡	POL	MF	1998–2001	86	18	5	0	0	0	0	0	91	18	
**Ivan**; **Zhelizko**	UKR	MF	2023–	82	14	5	0	0	0	0	0	87	14	
Paweł; Zieliński	POL	MF	1975	6	0	0	0	0	0	0	0	6	0	
Marek; Zieńczuk	POL	MF	1995–1999, 2010	111	19	6	1	0	0	18	4	135	24	
Andrzej; Zięba ‡	POL	MF	2000	11	1	5	1	0	0	0	0	16	2	
Ziętek	POL	MF	1946	1	0	0	0	0	0	0	0	1	0	
**Antoni**; **Ziółkowski**	POL	DF	2026–	0	0	0	0	0	0	0	0	0	0	
**Maksymilian**; **Ziółkowski**	POL	DF	2026–	0	0	0	0	0	0	0	0	0	0	
Marek; Ziółkowski	POL	MF	1989–1991	55	2	1	0	0	0	0	0	56	2	
Łukasz; Zjawiński	POL	FW	2021–2024	35	5	2	0	0	0	5	7	42	12	
Wojciech; Zyska	POL	MF	2012–2014	16	0	3	0	0	0	19	2	38	2	
Dariusz; Zgutczyński	POL	MF	1994–1995	29	1	1	0	0	0	0	0	30	1	
Łukasz; Zwoliński	POL	FW	2020–	94	36	9	6	4	2	0	0	107	44	
Michał; Żebrakowski	POL	FW	2015–2016	3	0	1	1	0	0	15	4	19	5	
Zbigniew; Żemojtel	POL	DF	1962–1968, 1972–1976	202	1	11	0	0	0	0	0	213	1	
Łukasz; Żółtowski ‡	POL	MF	2001	0	0	1	0	0	0	0	0	1	0	
Dzidosław; Żuberek ‡	POL	FW	2000	16	2	0	0	0	0	0	0	16	2	
Bogdan; Żubrowski	POL	MF	1979	3	0	0	0	0	0	0	0	3	0	
Paweł; Żuk (1985)	POL	MF	2001, 2003–2007	93	9	9	1	0	0	0	0	102	10	
Paweł; Żuk (2001)	POL	DF	2019–2020	2	0	0	0	0	0	16	1	18	1	
Mateusz; Żukowski	POL	FW	2018–2021	44	2	6	0	0	0	19	15	69	17	
Bolesław; Żytniak	POL	DF	1946–1950	8	0	0	0	0	0	16	0	24	0	
