= Dovbush (disambiguation) =

Oleksa Dovbush, a famous Ruthenian outlaw in the Polish–Lithuanian Commonwealth, who became a folk hero

Dovbush or Oleksa Dovbush may also refer to:

- Dovbush rocks, a rock formation located in western Ukraine
- Dovbush (film), a 2023 Ukrainian film directed by Oles Sanin
- Oleksa Dovbush (1959 film), a Soviet Ukrainian film of Dovzhenko Film Studios
- "Dovbush," a scenic folkloric dance by Ukrainian choreographer Vasyl Avramenko

== See also ==
- Dobosz
