= Eligiusz =

Eligiusz is a male Polish given name. Notable people with the name include:

- Eligiusz Gwoździński (1927–2005), Polish footballer
- Eligiusz Niewiadomski (1869–1923), Polish painter
