= Lasota =

Lasota is a surname. Notable people with the surname include:

- Dominika Lasota (born 2001), Polish climate activist
- Edvard Lasota (born 1971), Czech footballer
- Irena Lasota (born 1945), Polish philosopher and activist
- Jack LaSota, American lawyer
- Stefan Lasota (1910–1976), Polish footballer
- Ziz LaSota
