= Adamchik =

Adamchik (Russian: Ада́мчик) is an East Slavic surname derived from the given name Adam. The Polish-language version is Adamczyk.

Notable people with the last name include:

- Andrus Adamchik, leader of the Apache Cayenne project
- Ed Adamchik (born 1941), American football player
