= Łazarek =

Łazarek is a Polish surname. Notable people with the surname include:

- Grzegorz Łazarek (1964–2018), a Polish football midfielder player
- Wojciech Łazarek (1937–2023), a Polish football manager and forward player
