= Adamczyk =

Adamczyk (Polish pronunciation: [aˈdamt͡ʂɨk]) is a Polish surname. Notable people with the surname include:

- Adam Adamczyk (born 1950), Polish judoka
- Andrzej Adamczyk (born 1959), Polish politician
- Bogdan Adamczyk (born 1935), Polish football player
- Darius Adamczyk (born 1966), American businessman, CEO of Honeywell
- Dariusz Adamczyk (born 1966), Polish historian
- Edward Adamczyk (1921–1993), Polish athlete
- Hubert Adamczyk (born 1998), Polish football player
- Krzysztof Adamczyk (born 1956), Polish football player
- Marzenna Adamczyk (born 1956), Polish translator, diplomat
- Matt Adamczyk (born 1978), American businessman and politician
- Mirosław Adamczyk (born 1962), Polish bishop and Vatican diplomat
- Monika Adamczyk-Garbowska
- Patryk Adamczyk (born 1994), Polish athlete
- Piotr Adamczyk (born 1972), Polish actor
- Roman Adamczyk (1925–1988), Polish football player
- Vyacheslav Adamczyk (1933–2001), Belarusian journalist, writer, playwright and screenwriter
- Waldemar Adamczyk (born 1969), Polish football player
- Zygmunt Adamczyk (1923–1985), Polish football player
