= Józef Piekuta =

Polish footballer

Personal information
- Full name: Józef Piekuta
- Date of birth: 23 October 1922
- Place of birth: Poznań, Poland
- Date of death: 19 August 1981 (aged 58)
- Place of death: Gdańsk, Poland
- Height: 1.76 m (5 ft 9 in)
- Position: Goalkeeper

Youth career
- 1937–1939: Stomil Poznań

Senior career*
Years	Team	Apps	(Gls)
1945–1949	Pogoń Gdańsk		
1949–1953	Lechia Gdańsk	2	(0)
1953–1954	Ogniwo Sopot		
1954–1955	Start Gdańsk		

Managerial career
- Budowlani Gdynia
- Start Gdańsk
- Błękitni Gdańsk
- * Club domestic league appearances and goals

Józef Piekuta (23 October 1922 – 19 August 1981) is a former Polish footballer who played as a goalkeeper. He made 2 appearances for Lechia Gdańsk in the clubs first ever season in the I liga.

== Biography ==
Born in Poznań, Piekuta started playing football with the youth sides of Stomil Poznań. He played with Stomil from 1937 until the outbreak of World War II in 1939. The war impacted Piekuta's footballing development with the player missing out on playing through the ages of 18–23. After the war Piekuta moved to Gdańsk and joined the newly created Pogoń Gdańsk in 1945. After 4 years with the club he joined Lechia Gdańsk who were newly promoted to the I liga. He made his Lechia and I liga debut on 27 March 1949 playing in the 5–3 win over Ruch Chorzów. He often found himself to be the second choice goalkeeper behind Józef Pokorski for much of the season, next featuring in the game against Wisła Kraków in the 9th round of fixtures during the season, this time playing in a 5–1 defeat. Piekuta couldn't help Lechia survive relegation that season, but was among the first squad to ever play for the club in Poland's top division, and is still in an elite group of Lechia goalkeepers to play in the Ekstraklasa for the club. After 4 seasons with Lechia he joined Ogniwo Sopot in 1953, Start Gdańsk in 1954, and retired from playing football in 1955. He is known to have held managerial positions with Budowlani Gdynia, Start Gdańsk and Błękitni Gdańsk. He died on 19 August 1981 aged 58.
