= Dobosz =

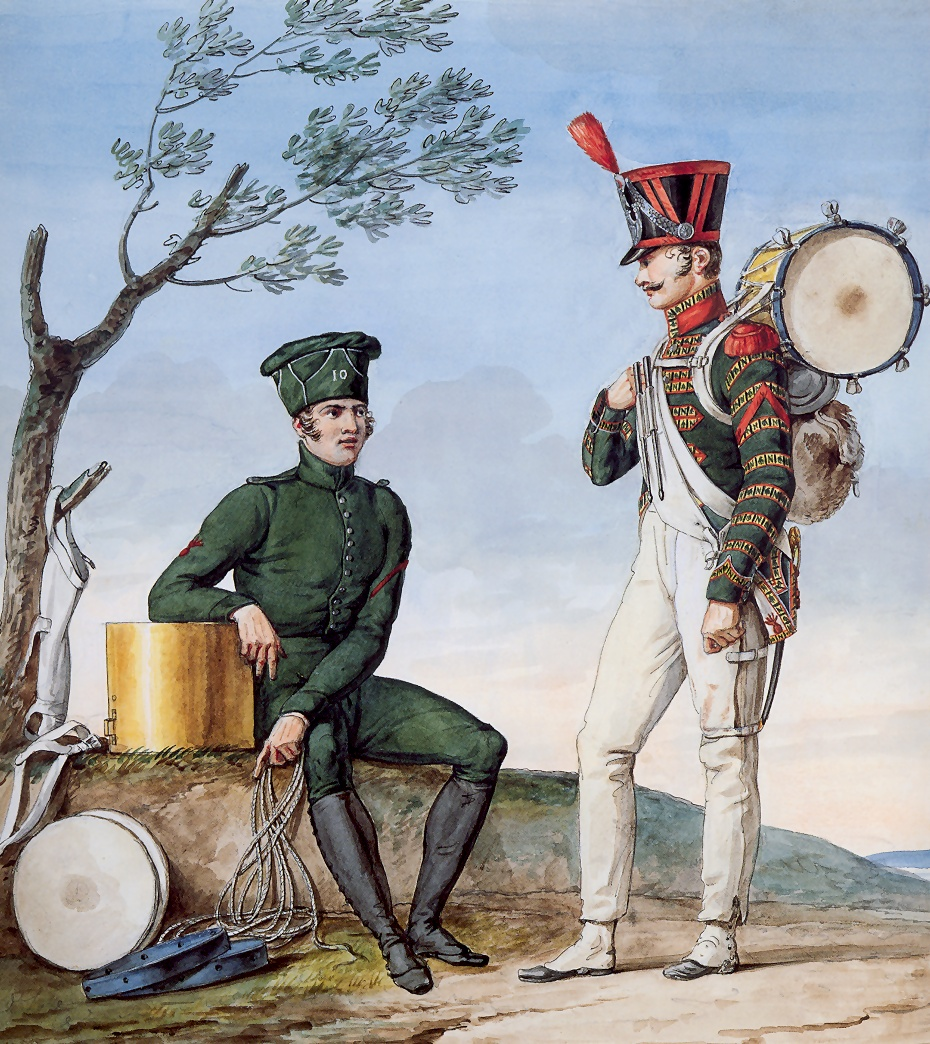
Dobosze

Dobosz is a Polish surname of two suggested origins. One origin is a pet name for any old Polish names starting with dob-, dobie- (Old Slavic: dobъ) meaning "brave" or "good", "appropriate". Another meaning is "(military) drummer", the phonetic respelling of the Hungarian dobos. Notable people with the surname include:

- Aleksy Dobosz (1700–1745), Ruthenian outlaw in Polish–Lithuanian Commonwealth
- Bernadeta Dobosz
- Bogdan Dobosz (born 1960), Polish journalist
- Damian Dobosz (born 1992), Polish volleyball player
- Dariusz Dobosz (1962–2017), Polish journalist
- Franciszek Dobosz (1897–1967), Polish soldier
- Henryk Dobosz (born 1953), Polish chess master
- Jan Dobosz (born 1943)
- Janusz Dobosz (1936–2002), Polish footballer
- Magdalena Dobosz (born 1976), Polish singer of Artrosis
- Marta Dobosz (born 1959), Polish actreece
- Krystyna Jaźwińska-Dobosz, Polish opera singer
- Leszek Dobosz (born 1943)
- Piotr Dobosz (born 1961)
- Stanisław Dobosz (1902–1969), Polish politician
- Tadeusz Dobosz (born 1937), Polish artist
- Teresa Dobosz (1945–2014), Polish politician
- Wacław Dobosz (1911–1943)
- Wilhelm Dobosz
- Zbigniew Dobosz (1944–2014)
