= Marcin Szałęga =

Polish footballer

Personal information
- Full name: Marcin Szałęga
- Date of birth: 12 August 1982 (age 44)
- Place of birth: Żary, Poland
- Height: 1.80 m (5 ft 11 in)
- Position: Midfielder

Youth career
- Promień Żary
- LSPM Zielona Góra
- 1999–2000: Lechia Zielona Góra

Senior career*
Years	Team	Apps	(Gls)
2000–2001	Zryw Zielona Góra		
2001	Wisła Kraków	2	(0)
2002–2004	Wisła Kraków II		
2004	Górnik Zabrze	1	(0)
2005	Górnik Polkowice	9	(0)
2005–2006	Wisła Kraków II		
2006–2009	Lechia Gdańsk	11	(1)
2009–2012	Termalica Bruk-Bet	83	(7)
2012–2013	Okocimski KS Brzesko	12	(0)
- * Club domestic league appearances and goals

Marcin Szałęga (born 12 August 1982) is a Polish former professional footballer who played as a midfielder.

== Honours ==
Wisła Kraków

- Polish Cup: 2001–02

Lechia Gdańsk

- II liga: 2007–08

LKS Nieciecza

- II liga East: 2009–10
