= Bartosz Jurkowski =

Polish association football player and manager

Personal information
- Full name: Bartosz Jurkowski
- Date of birth: 30 March 1974 (age 52)
- Place of birth: Białystok, Poland
- Height: 1.84 m (6 ft 0 in)
- Position: Defender

Youth career
- Jagiellonia Białystok

Senior career*
| Years | Team | Apps | (Gls) |
| 1991–1993 | Jagiellonia Białystok | 50 | (1) |
| 1994–1995 | Stomil Olsztyn | 29 | (0) |
| 1995–1996 | Jeziorak Iława | 26 | (0) |
| 1996–1997 | Amica Wronki | 22 | (1) |
| 1998–2000 | Stomil Olsztyn | 75 | (9) |
| 2000–2004 | Orlen/Wisła Płock | 65 | (0) |
| 2004–2007 | Górnik Łęczna | 65 | (1) |
| 2008 | Lechia Gdańsk | 3 | (0) |
| 2008–2009 | Ruch Wysokie Mazowieckie | 27 | (0) |
| 2010 | BKS Jagiellonia Białystok | | |
| Total | | 362 | (12) |

Managerial career
- 2010–2011: Znicz Suraż
- 2012: Dąb Dąbrowa Białostocka
- 2019: Ruch Wysokie Mazowieckie
- * Club domestic league appearances and goals

Bartosz Jurkowski (born 30 March 1974) is a Polish football manager and former player who played as a defender. During his career he made 265 appearances in Poland's top division.

== Career ==
=== Jagiellonia Białystok ===
Jurkowski began playing football with his local side Jagiellonia Białystok for the clubs academy. He made his debut for the club, and his debut in the I liga, Poland's highest division, on 8 August 1992. His first season with the Jagiellonia first team proved to be difficult, with the club being relegated in last place, having only won two of their games all season. Jurkowski spent his next two seasons playing with Jagiellonia in the II liga, with the club finishing midtable on both occasions.

=== Stomil Olsztyn ===
During the winter break of the 1993–94 season Jurkowski joined Stomil Olsztyn. Instantly he enjoyed success with Stomil, playing 11 times in the second half of the season as the club went on to win the II liga (Eastern group). Back in the top division, Jurkowski helped Stomil just survive, making 18 appearances as the team survived the drop on goal difference.

=== Jeziorak Iława & Amica Wronki ===
The following season he dropped back to the II liga to join Jeziorak Iława. Jurkowski made 26 appearances as Jeziorak finished in 4th place. Despite the high finish, Jurkowski left the club after only one season. Jurkowski returned to the I liga the following season, joining Amica Wronki. Upon joining the club he had was a back up player only featuring as a substitute. Midway through the season Jurkowski became a starter, starting 16 of the final 18 appearances that season, as Amica finished in a respectable midtable finish. Jurkowski was once again dropped back to the bench for the following season, and after making only 1 appearance of the opening 17, and left the club midway through the season.

=== Return to Stomil Olsztyn ===
Jurkowski re-joined Stomil Olsztyn, instantly becoming a starter once again. He spent another 2 1/2 years with Stomil, with his final year, 1999–2000, being his most successful in terms of goalscoring. He became Stomil's penalty taker, helping him to score 7 league goals that season, more than half of his entire career.

=== Orlen/Wisła Płock ===
His next club was Orlen Płock, becoming a starter as soon as he joined the club, starting every game in the autumn round. However, during the winter break he lost his place in the starting eleven, failing to make any appearances in the second half of the season. In his second season he failed to register a single league appearance, with his only appearance coming in the League Cup. At the end of the season, Orlen Płock changed their name to Wisła Płock. The change in name also appeared to change the fortunes for Jurkowski, who found himself back in the starting line-up. That same season Wisła made it to the final of the Polish Cup, losing in the final to Wisła Kraków, Jurkowski making 6 appearances in the process. The following season Wisła qualified for the UEFA Cup, drawing FK Ventspils in the qualifying rounds. This was Wisła's first experience of European football, however despite being a starter for the team, Jurkowski was not selected for either match against Ventspils. During his four years with Wisła, he made 65 league appearances, with the majority coming in the final two seasons with the club.

=== Later years ===
After his time with Wisła, he joined Górnik Łęczna. He spent 3 1/2 seasons with Górnik, being a key member of the squad for his first two seasons, eventually seeing less playing time, before being dropped completely for his final six months. In 2008 he dropped to the II liga, joining Lechia Gdańsk for six months. He was only a minor player for Lechia, playing 3 matches in March, and being dropped from the starting eleven for the remainder of the season as Lechia went on to win the II liga. After Lechia's promotion, Jurkowski remained in the II liga playing with Ruch Wysokie Mazowieckie, helping the team to the clubs highest finish in their history, 6th place. In 2010 he finished off his career playing for the Jagiellonia Białystok fan club, BKS Jagiellonia Białystok.

=== Management ===
After he retired from playing, Jurkowski has gone on to manage in the lower leagues. His first role was with Znicz Suraż, later having roles with Dąb Dąbrowa Białostocka and Ruch Wysokie Mazowieckie.

== Honours ==
Stomil Olsztyn

- II liga East: 1993–94

Lechia Gdańsk

- II liga: 2007–08
