= Benedykt Gumowski =

Polish footballer

Personal information
- Full name: Benedykt Gumowski
- Date of birth: 31 March 1936 (age 90)
- Place of birth: Grodzisk Mazowiecki, Poland
- Height: 1.73 m (5 ft 8 in)
- Position: Forward

Youth career
- 1952–1955: Lechia Gdańsk

Senior career*
Years	Team	Apps	(Gls)
1955–1956	Lechia Gdańsk	1	(0)
1957–1958	Polonia Warsaw		
1958–1963	AZS AWF Warszawa		
- * Club domestic league appearances and goals

Benedykt Gumowski (born 31 March 1936) was a Polish footballer who played as a forward, and the first person to score a goal in a televised football game in Poland.

== Biography ==
Gumowski started playing football with Lechia Gdańsk, progressing to the first team and making his debut in the Polish Cup against Wisła Kraków. The following season Gumowski made his league debut, starting against ŁKS Łódź in the I liga, Poland's top division. Gumowski joined Polonia Warsaw in 1957, and it was with Polonia in which he made his most notable accomplishment in Polish football. On 10 March 1957 Polonia hosted a friendly game with Gwardia Warsaw in which was the first televised football game in Poland. Polonia won 1–0, with Gumowski scoring the only goal, leading to Gumowski to be the scorer of the first televised goal in Polish football. He later joined AZS AWF Warszawa, where he spent five years playing, before retiring from playing football in 1963.
