= Henryk Dąbrowski (footballer) =

Polish footballer

Personal information
- Full name: Henryk Dąbrowski
- Date of birth: 24 November 1924
- Place of birth: Starogard Gdański, Poland
- Date of death: 16 November 1983 (aged 58)
- Place of death: Gdańsk, Poland
- Height: 1.82 m (6 ft 0 in)
- Position: Goalkeeper

Senior career*
Years	Team	Apps	(Gls)
–1947	SKS Starogard		
1947–1948	Wierzyca Starogard		
1948–1949	Gedania Gdańsk		
1949–1952	Lechia Gdańsk	2	(0)
1952–1956	Gedania Gdańsk		

Managerial career
- Ogniwo Sopot
- * Club domestic league appearances and goals

Henryk Dąbrowski (24 November 1924 – 16 November 1983) is a former Polish footballer who played as a goalkeeper. He spent his career playing for four teams split between the cities of Starogard Gdański and Gdańsk. He made 2 appearances in Poland's top division during his career.

== Biography ==
Dąbrowski was born in Starogard Gdański during the Second Polish Republic. By the time World War 2 broke out Dąbrowski was aged 15, however it is known that when he was old enough he took part in the North African campaign and the Italian campaign. For his efforts during the war Dąbrowski was awarded the Order Virtuti Militari, the Africa Star, the Italy Star, and the Monte Cassino Commemorative Cross.

After the war he returned to his hometown where he played for SKS Starogard until 1947, when he joined Wierzyca Starogard. After a season with Wierzyca he moved to Gdańsk to play for Gedania Gdańsk, once again moving the season after to join Lechia Gdańsk. It was with the club that on 14 August 1949 he made his I liga debut playing against Cracovia in a 1–1 draw. Two weeks later it is known he also played the full match against Polonia Warsaw in an away defeat. Dąbrowski couldn't help Lechia survive relegation that season, but was among the first squad to ever play for the club in Poland's top division, and is still in an elite group of Lechia goalkeepers to play in the Ekstraklasa for the club. After three years with Lechia he returned to Gedania Gdańsk until retiring from playing in 1956. It is also known that he managed Ogniwo Sopot at some point after retiring.

He died on 16 November 1983 in Gdańsk and is buried in the Oliwa district of the city.

== Awards ==
- Virtuti Militari
- Africa Star
- Italy Star
- Monte Cassino Commemorative Cross
