= Krzysztof Nosko =

Polish footballer

Personal information
- Full name: Krzysztof Nosko
- Date of birth: 2 January 1962 (age 64)
- Place of birth: Poland
- Position: Midfielder

Senior career*
Years	Team	Apps	(Gls)
- Olimpia Elbląg
1980–1981	Lechia Gdańsk	16	(0)
- * Club domestic league appearances and goals

Krzysztof Nosko (born 2 January 1962) was a Polish football player who played as a midfielder.

He is known to have started his career with Olimpia Elbląg, and moved to Gdańsk to play with Lechia Gdańsk aged 18. He made his Lechia debut on 7 September 1980 playing in the 2–0 win over Pogoń Szczecin, going on to make 9 appearances in his first season with the club. In his second season he went on to make a further 7 appearances at the start of the season, making a combined total of 16 appearances in Poland's second division, and 17 appearances in all competitions for Lechia. Nosko left Lechia just before his 20th birthday with little information about his career afterwards, leading to the possibility he played in the lower divisions where there is less documentation about teams and players, or that he moved into a different profession entirely.
