= Tomasz Piętka =

Polish footballer

Personal information
- Full name: Tomasz Piętka
- Date of birth: 22 March 1972 (age 54)
- Place of birth: Gdańsk, Poland
- Height: 1.83 m (6 ft 0 in)
- Position: Defender

Youth career
- 1982–1989: Lechia Gdańsk

Senior career*
Years	Team	Apps	(Gls)
1989–1995	Lechia Gdańsk	154	(10)
- * Club domestic league appearances and goals

Tomasz Piętka (born 22 March 1972) is a former Polish footballer who played as a defender, spending his entire playing career with Lechia Gdańsk.

== Biography ==
Piętka was born in Przymorze district of Gdańsk. While in school he was coached in football by Lechia Gdańsk footballer Bogdan Kazojć, who convinced Piętka to join the Lechia Gdańsk academy. While with the academy he helped Lechia to achieve a silver medal and bronze medal in the 1989 and 1990 Polish Junior Championships. On 29 April 1989 Piętka made his first team debut, playing in the defeat against GKS Bełchatów. Often the young Piętka would find himself in school, and later, university, during the day going on to train or play for Lechia in the evening. During his career with Lechia he studied economics at the University of Gdańsk, at this point finding himself as a regular starter for the team. While still a regular in the team, Piętka graduated with a masters in economics in 1995, having to decide whether to continue his career in football or to take a job using his economics qualifications, ultimately choosing the latter. During his career at Lechia he made a total of 154 appearances and scored 10 goals in the league.
