= Andrzej Konopek =

Polish footballer

Personal information
- Full name: Andrzej Konopek
- Date of birth: 30 November 1920
- Place of birth: Kraków, Poland
- Date of death: 27 November 2007 (aged 86)
- Place of death: Kraków, Poland
- Height: 1.70 m (5 ft 7 in)
- Position: Midfielder

Senior career*
Years	Team	Apps	(Gls)
1936–1947	Zwierzyniecki Kraków		
1947–1948	Hutnik Nowa Huta		
1949	Lechia Gdańsk	6	(0)
1950–1952	Hutnik Nowa Huta		
1953–1955	Lechia Gdańsk	0	(0)
1955–1960	Zwierzyniecki Kraków		
- * Club domestic league appearances and goals

Andrzej Konopek (30 November 1920 – 27 November 2007) is a former Polish footballer who played as a midfielder. Konopek's career spanned over 20 years and was split between 3 teams.

== Biography ==
Born in Kraków, Konopek started his career with his local team Zwierzyniecki Kraków. While his career was spent playing in the lower divisions of Polish football, Konopek was involved in a footnote of Polish footballing history. As the war was coming to an end the reintroduction of football in Poland was discussed. On 28 January 1945, 10 days after the liberation of Kraków, four teams in the city came together to play their first games since the outbreak of the war in 1939. The four teams were Cracovia, Juvenia, Wisła, and Zwierzyniecki. The first game of the day was Juvenia vs Zwierzyniecki, and it was the first football game in Poland since the outbreak. Konopek was involved in the game, which finished 2–2, with Konopek scoring both of Zwierzyniecki goals. This means that not only was Konopek involved in the first football game since 1939, but he may have also been the first goal scorer.

Konopek remained with Zwierzyniecki until 1947, when he moved to Hutnik Nowa Huta. After being with Hutnik for 2 years, he moved to the newly promoted I liga side Lechia Gdańsk. Konopek made his top division debut on 15 September 1949 against ŁKS Łódź. He went on to make 6 appearances for Lechia that season, but with the club being relegated Konopek returned to Hutnik Nowa Huta. After spending a few more years with Hutnik, Konopek returned to the North of Poland and rejoined Lechia. He spent 3 years with Lechia but failed to make any further appearances for the club. In 1955 he returned to the club where he started his career, spending the final 5 years of his career with Zwierzyniecki Kraków before retiring in 1960.
