= Jan Richert =

Polish footballer (1922–1992)

Personal information
- Full name: Jan Eryk Richert
- Date of birth: 19 August 1922
- Place of birth: Danzig, Free City of Danzig
- Date of death: 9 August 1992 (aged 69)
- Place of death: Düren, Germany
- Height: 1.62 m (5 ft 4 in)
- Position: Defender

Senior career*
Years	Team	Apps	(Gls)
1936–1939	Gedania Danzig		
1945–1948	Gedania Gdańsk		
1948–1950	Lechia Gdańsk	2	(0)
- * Club domestic league appearances and goals

Jan Eryk Richert (19 August 1922 – 9 August 1992) was a Polish footballer who played as a defender. Richert spent his career playing football in Gdańsk (then known as Danzig) with Gedania Danzig. After three years playing with Gedania the club were forced to cease operations after the Nazi occupation of Poland. In total 75 people associated with Gedania before the war were killed, with most of the players and coaching staff being sent to concentration camps, Richert being one of the few players associated with the club surviving the war. After the war Richert began playing for the phoenix club of Gedania Danzig, joining Gedania Gdańsk in 1945. After another three years with Gedania he joined city rivals Lechia Gdańsk. He made his Lechia and I liga debut on 16 October 1949 in the 4–1 defeat to Warta Poznań. He was a part of Lechia's first squad to play in Poland's top division and made 1 appearance for Lechia in the I liga that season. His final appearance for Lechia came in the 2–2 draw with Arkonia Szczecin. After his football career ended, Richert emigrated to Germany in 1972. He lived there until his death on 9 August 1992, at the age of 69.
