= Jan Dziekański =

Polish footballer and athlete

Personal information
- Full name: Jan Dziekański
- Date of birth: 14 June 1917
- Place of birth: Grodzisk Mazowiecki, Poland
- Date of death: 29 November 1993 (aged 71)
- Place of death: Warsaw, Poland
- Height: 1.76 m (5 ft 9 in)
- Position: Midfielder

Senior career*
Years	Team	Apps	(Gls)
1935–1937	Pogoń Grodzisk Mazowiecki		
1938–1939	Polonia Warsaw		
1945–1946	Pogoń Grodzisk Mazowiecki		
1946	Lechia Gdańsk	1	(1)
1946–1947	Grom Gdynia		
- * Club domestic league appearances and goals

Jan Dziekański (14 June 1917 – 29 November 1993) was a Polish footballer who played as a midfielder, as well as an athletics athlete who competed as a sprinter and Long jumper.

== Biography ==
Born in Grodzisk Mazowiecki, Dziekański began playing football with the Pogoń Grodzisk Mazowiecki sports club, joining the team in 1930. He eventually progressed to the first team, before leaving in at the end of 1937. Dziekański moved to Warsaw in 1938, and joined the Polonia Warsaw football club, and Warszawianka athletics club. With Polonia, Dziekański is known to have featured in the I liga, the top division of Polish football, scoring at least once during that time. In the 1939 Polish athletics championships, while representing Warszawianka, he won silver medals in both the 4 × 100 m relay and in the long jump.

The outbreak of World War II disrupted Dziekański's sporting career. Dziekański took part of the defence of Poland during the September Campaign, and joined the Home Army after Poland was occupied by the German and Soviet forces. During the war he was known under the pseudonym "Jastrząb", and got injured during a skirmish in 1944.

After the war, Dziekański returned to playing football, joining his home team of Pogoń Grodzisk Mazowiecki. In 1946 he moved to the tricity, playing with Lechia Gdańsk. He only played one match for Lechia, in which he also scored a goal in a 10–1 victory. Dziekański then joined Grom Gdynia, before retiring from football in 1947.

== Competition record ==
Jan Dziekański
Personal information
- Nationality: Polish

Sport
- Sport: Athletics
- Events: 4×100 metres, Long jump
- Club: Warszawianka

=== 4×100m relay ===
Year	Competition	Venue	Position	Notes
Representing Warszawianka
1939	Polish Championships	Poznań, Poland	2nd	44.8(s)

=== Long jump ===
Year	Competition	Venue	Position	Notes
Representing Warszawianka
1939	Polish Championships	Poznań, Poland	2nd	6.57m

== Awards ==
- Cross of the Home Army
