= Zygmunt Gross =

Polish footballer and manager

Personal information
- Full name: Zygmunt Gross
- Date of birth: 12 July 1936 (age 90)
- Place of birth: Danzig, Free City of Danzig
- Height: 1.80 m (5 ft 11 in)
- Position: Midfielder

Youth career
- –1949: Gwardia Gdańsk
- 1949–1953: Wybrzeże Gdańsk
- 1953: Stal Gdańsk
- 1953–1954: Polonia Gdańsk
- 1954: AZS Gdańsk
- 1955: Lechia Gdańsk

Senior career*
Years	Team	Apps	(Gls)
1956–1957	Lechia Gdańsk	22	(0)
1957–1958	Zawisza Bydgoszcz		
- Polonia Melbourne

Managerial career
- 1987: RACV Melbourne
- * Club domestic league appearances and goals

Zygmunt Gross (born 12 July 1936) is a retired Polish professional footballer who played for both Lechia Gdańsk and Zawisza Bydgoszcz in the Polish leagues.

Gross was born in Danzig, the Free City of Danzig, which later became Gdańsk and part of Poland. He spent his early years playing for many different clubs in Gdańsk, playing for Gwardia, Wybrzeże, Stal, Polonia, ASZ, and Lechia. It was with Lechia Gdańsk where his professional career started. On 5 August 1956 Gross made his Lechia debut in the 4–0 away win against Legia Warsaw. In his first season he went on to play 8 times in the I liga. In his second season Gross found himself to be a more important first team player, making a total of 14 appearances in the league that season, with an additional two appearances coming in the Polish Cup. In total for Lechia he made 22 top division appearances and made 24 appearances in all competitions. In 1957 Gross joined Zawisza Bydgoszcz, as was common at the time for players playing in Gdańsk due to the mandatory conscription in Poland during this time, and was fortunate to be representing a military sponsored football club. After his time with Zawisza Gross retired from professional football. At some point he emigrated to Australia and played for the Polish diaspora amateur team Polonia Melbourne. In 1987 Gross had his first try at management in football, becoming the manager of the RACV Melbourne team, leaving the position in the same year.
