= Tomasz Krystek =

Polish footballer

Personal information
- Full name: Tomasz Krystek
- Date of birth: 28 December 1934 (age 91)
- Position: Goalkeeper

Senior career*
Years	Team	Apps	(Gls)
1953	Lechia Gdańsk	1	(0)
- * Club domestic league appearances and goals

Tomasz Krystek (born 28 December 1934) is a Polish former footballer who played as a goalkeeper. He is documented to have been a part of the Lechia Gdańsk team for the 1953 I liga season. His Lechia debut came on 12 April 1953 in a 1–2 defeat to Górnik Radlin. Despite the few appearances for Lechia, he has often been involved with group events regarding the football club and with higher profile players.
