= Grzegorz Oprządek =

Polish footballer

Personal information
- Full name: Grzegorz Oprządek
- Date of birth: 7 June 1943 (age 83)
- Place of birth: Warsaw, Poland
- Height: 1.80 m (5 ft 11 in)
- Position: Defender

Youth career
- 1958–1962: Lechia Gdańsk

Senior career*
Years	Team	Apps	(Gls)
1963–1967	Lechia Gdańsk	42	(4)
Total		42	(4)
- * Club domestic league appearances and goals

Grzegorz Oprządek, born on 7 June 1943, is a former Polish footballer known for his role as a defender.

== Biography ==
Born in Warsaw, Oprządek moved to Gdańsk at a young age, where he began honing his football skills on the streets and in his friends’ back gardens. His father’s passion for Lechia Gdańsk sparked Oprządek’s own love for the club, leading to regular attendance at games from childhood.

Oprządek’s football journey officially began in 1958 when he joined Lechia’s youth teams. By 1963, he had earned a spot in the first team, making his professional debut in the I liga on March 24 against Odra Opole. Despite the team’s relegation that season, Oprządek made 12 appearances and scored one goal. Over the next four seasons in the II liga, he added 30 appearances and scored three more goals.

In total, Oprządek contributed 43 appearances and four goals across all competitions during his tenure with Lechia Gdańsk, retiring from professional football in 1967.
