= Hubert Nowakowski =

Polish footballer

Personal information
- Full name: Hubert Nowakowski
- Date of birth: 31 October 1919
- Place of birth: Chorzów, Poland
- Date of death: 11 July 2000 (aged 80)
- Place of death: Gdańsk, Poland
- Height: 1.78 m (5 ft 10 in)
- Position: Defender

Senior career*
Years	Team	Apps	(Gls)
1931–1938	AKS Chorzów		
1938–1939	Lechia Tomaszów Mazowiecki		
1940–1945	Hamburger SV reserves		
1945	Flota Gdynia		
1946–1952	Lechia Gdańsk	10	(0)
- * Club domestic league appearances and goals

Hubert Nowakowski (31 October 1919 – 11 July 2000) was a Polish footballer who played as a defender.

== Biography ==
Born in Chorzów, Nowakowski played for his local football club AKS Chorzów from 1931 to 1938, starting with the clubs youth team, eventually progressing to the first team. It is documented that he played with Hertha Królewska Huta before he joined Lechia Tomaszów Mazowiecki in 1938, but there is no date specified for his time with Hertha. Nowakowski played with Lechia Tomaszów until the outbreak of the war. During the war Nowakowski was moved to Germany to work in a factory, playing for the Hamburger SV reserve team during this time. After the war Nowakowski moved to the Tricity area in Northern Poland. He first played with Flota Gdynia, before his move to Lechia Gdańsk in 1946.

Nowakowski made his Lechia debut on 10 August 1946 playing in a 6–0 win over HCP Poznań. Nowakowski played with Lechia for a total of 6 years, but was often more of a backup player, and not making many appearances over the course of a season. The highlight of his career came in 1949 when Nowakowski made 2 appearances in the I liga, Poland's top division. His appearances in the I liga came against Lech Poznań and ŁKS Łódź. Nowakowski made his last appearance for the club in 1952 in the Young Leaders Rally Cup, featuring as Lechia won 1–0 against Polonia Bytom. Despite his last appearance being in 1952, Nowakowski was involved with Lechia until 1956, either in the role as a reserve player, or taking up a coaching role within the club. In total Nowakowski made 31 appearances for Lechia and scored 1 goal in all competitions.

His son is Ewald Nowakowski, who also played for Lechia Gdańsk between the years of 1963–1965.
