= Robert Kozioła =

Polish footballer

Personal information
- Full name: Robert Kozioła
- Date of birth: 13 January 1981 (age 45)
- Place of birth: Poland
- Height: 1.92 m (6 ft 3 1/2 in)
- Position: Defender

Youth career
- –1999: GKP Gorzów Wielkopolski

Senior career*
Years	Team	Apps	(Gls)
1999–2000	Czarni Żagań		
2000	Lechia-Polonia Gdańsk	0	(0)
2001–2002	Czarni Żagań		
2002–2006	Promień Żary		
2006–2007	Polonia Słubice		
2007–2009	GKP Gorzów Wielkopolski	34	(1)
2010–2011	Pogoń Barlinek	15	(0)
2011–2014	Stilon Gorzów Wielkopolski		
2015	Warta Gorzów Wielkopolski		
2015–2016	Stilon Gorzów Wielkopolski		
- * Club domestic league appearances and goals

Robert Kozioła (born 13 January 1981) is a Polish former professional footballer who played as a defender.

He started his career playing for the youth sides of GKP Gorzów Wielkopolski, joining Czarni Żagań in 1999 to start his professional career. In 2000 he joined II liga side Lechia-Polonia Gdańsk who were playing in the second division of Polish football. Kozioła failed to make a league appearance for the club during his six-month spell, but made appearances in the Polish Cup and in the Polish League Cup. Kozioła returned to Czarni Żagań for the following season before joining Promień Żary for a period of stability playing with the club for four seasons. After a short spell with Polonia Słubice he rejoined the club where his career started, GKP Gorzów Wielkopolski, going on to make appearances in the second and third Polish divisions, with the 2008–09 season being that in which he played his highest standard of football, making 7 appearances in the newly structured I liga. After the highlight of his career he spent two seasons with Pogoń Barlinek, rejoining GKP Gorzów Wielkopolski which now went by the name Stilon Gorzów Wielkopolski. Apart from a 6-month stint playing with Warta Gorzów Wielkopolski the rest of his career was spent playing with Stilon until 2016, when he retired from playing professional football.
