= Janusz Mirowski =

Polish footballer

Personal information
- Full name: Janusz Mirowski
- Date of birth: 1944 (age 81–82)
- Place of birth: Poland
- Position: Forward

Senior career*
Years	Team	Apps	(Gls)
1966–1967	Lechia Gdańsk	9	(0)
- * Club domestic league appearances and goals

Janusz Mirowski (born in 1944) is a former Polish footballer who played as a forward. Little is known about Mirowski's career as a footballer, but it is known that he played for Lechia Gdańsk in the II liga during the 1966–67 season, making a total of 9 league appearances. Mirowski's only goal for Lechia came in his final appearance with the club, scoring in the Polish Cup in Lechia's defeat to Warmia Olsztyn II.
