= Stefan Kliński =

Polish footballer (1947 – 2023)

Personal information
- Full name: Stefan Kliński
- Date of birth: 24 September 1947
- Place of birth: Bytom, Poland
- Date of death: 22 April 2023 (aged 75)
- Place of death: Gdynia, Poland
- Height: 1.74 m (5 ft 9 in)
- Position: Defender

Youth career
- 1960–1963: Szombierki Bytom

Senior career*
Years	Team	Apps	(Gls)
1963–1971	Szombierki Bytom	149	(3)
1973	Zagłębie Sosnowiec	5	(0)
1974–1975	KSZO Ostrowiec Świętokrzyski	0	(0)
1975–1978	Arka Gdynia	48+	(5+)
1978–1979	Lechia Gdańsk	17	(0)
1979–1982	Gryf Słupsk	32	(2)

International career
1963–1966	Poland U19	13	(0)
1966–1970	Poland U23	7	(0)
- * Club domestic league appearances and goals

Stefan Kliński (24 September 1947 – 22 April 2023) was a Polish footballer who played as a defender. Kliński made over 200 appearances in Poland's top division, and also represented Poland in their youth teams.

== Biography ==
=== Club career ===
Due to where Kliński was brought up, he was only a walk away from the Szombierki Bytom stadium, and tried out for the club's youth teams. Despite his young age Kliński showed great potential and made his Szombierki debut in the I liga, then Poland's top division, 16 days before his 16th birthday. He would go on to have a successful career with Szombierki, making 149 appearances in the I liga, while also contributing 3 goals over 9 seasons. With Szombierki Bytom he also won a league runners-up medal for the 1964–65 season. Kliński's career however was put on hold after he was arrested and sent to prison for 2 years regarding a crime of a "moral nature" with one of his Szombierki teammates girlfriends. After being released from prison he joined struggling Zagłębie Sosnowiec just three days later. Zagłębie who were in need of a solid defender, however after the time away from football Kliński also struggled for form, and he only played in 5 league matches, leaving midway through the season. After another six months away from football he joined KSZO Ostrowiec Świętokrzyski, however likely because he was still under a contract with Zagłębie, he was blocked from appearing for the first team, resulting in Kliński going into coaching for a short time, where he coached with the KSZO Ostrowiec Świętokrzyski youth teams.

After making only 5 league appearances over the space of 4 years, Kliński decided to move away from the Silesian region of Poland and that he needed a change of atmosphere for the good of his career. In 1975 he joined Arka Gdynia, then playing in the II liga. With Arka he regained his form and helped the club secure promotion back to the I liga by winning the league. Kliński formed a strong partnership with Zbyszek Bieliński. Despite being short for a defender, Kliński became a popular figure at Arka for his defensive abilities, penalty taking, and became the team captain, while earning the name "Sheriff" for how he controlled the defence. Back in the I liga, Kliński made a further 48 appearances in the top division, and scoring 5 goals for Arka in the process. After only 3 years he left Arka being seen as one of the club's greatest defenders.

After leaving Arka he joined rivals Lechia Gdańsk for a season. Playing in the II liga, he made 17 league appearances for the club, and a further 2 in the Polish Cup. Despite Lechia finishing third in the league and reaching the quarter finals for the cup, he chose to leave at the end of the season. The final club of his career was Gryf Słupsk. He won promotion with Gryf during the 1980–81 season, securing second division football for the first time since the 1950s. Gryf also performed well the following season and had a chance of securing back-to-back promotions, and to play in the I liga for the first time in their history. However a scandal arose late in the season in Słupsk after Kliński was spotted talking to a former Szombierki teammate, and suspicion arose that Kliński may try to throw the game in the league leaders, GKS Katowice's, favour. He chose himself not to take part in the game against Katowice, but Gryf still lost the game, and effectively all chance of securing promotion. Kliński would go on to make only 9 more appearances for Gryf, before he retired from football. He played four seasons for Gryf, playing in the III liga and the II liga. In the II liga he made 32 appearances for the club, scoring 2 goals.

=== International career ===
During his early career Kliński featured many times for the youth sides of Poland. For the under-19s he made 13 appearances, making his debut against Czechoslovakia. He then progressed to the under-23s, making 7 appearances, with his debut coming against Sweden. He would also feature for the Poland B and Silesian U-23 national teams.

Kliński was also called up to the Poland national team for a tour of South America, however all of the fixtures on this tour were unofficial. He featured in games against a combined Club Alianza Lima and Club Universitario de Deportes team in Peru, and against Millonarios in Colombia. He would feature more times for Poland against Polish club opposition, but he never played in an official match for the Polish senior team.

=== After football ===
After retiring Kliński only ever attended matches as a fan, never taking on a role in football again. He continued to live in Gdynia after his retirement, and became a fan of Arka Gdynia. Before fully retiring he worked for Prasa-Książka-Ruch and as a port guard in post offices in Gdynia.

Kliński died on 22 April 2023. He is buried in the parish cemetery in Gdynia-Oksywie.

== Honours ==
Szombierki Bytom

- Ekstraklasa runner-up: 1964–65

Arka Gdynia

- II liga: 1976–77

Gryf Słupsk

- III liga, group I: 1980–81
