= Arsen Khanamiryan =

Armenian footballer

Personal information
- Full name: Arsen Khanamiryan
- Date of birth: 27 January 1968
- Place of birth: Armenia
- Date of death: 1 June 2016 (aged 48)
- Place of death: Yerevan, Armenia
- Height: 1.60 m (5 ft 3 in)
- Position: Forward

Senior career*
Years	Team	Apps	(Gls)
1990	SKA Rostov-on-Don		
1991	Druzhba Maykop		
1991	Lori		
1992–1994	ASS-SKIF Yerevan		
1995	Lechia Gdańsk	5	(0)
1995	Jagiellonia Białystok	2	(1)
- * Club domestic league appearances and goals

Arsen Khanamiryan (Armenian: Արսեն Խանամիրյանի; 27 January 1968 – 1 June 2016), also cited in some sources as Arsen Chanamirian, was an Armenian footballer who played as a forward.

== Biography ==
Khanamiryan played football in the lower Russian divisions with SKA Rostov-on-Don, being teammates with notable Russian footballer Oleg Veretennikov. After a season Khanamiryan and had a short stay with Russian team Druzhba Maykop before returning to his homeland. Back in Armenia, Khanamiryan initially joined Lori, before joining ASS-SKIF Yerevan, with whom he played for 3 seasons.

He is most well known for his time playing in Poland. Less for his footballing ability, but for his antics and his dedicated following from Armenian merchants living in Poland. He first arrived in Poland to join Lechia Gdańsk in 1995. Khanamiryan made his debut against Amica Wronki, and played a total of 5 games for Lechia in the II liga. In the summer of 1995 he joined Jagiellonia Białystok. Khanamiryan was recommended to the club by Armenian merchants, and was picked to play for Jagiellonia against Wisła Kraków. Due to the player having no kit the team provided the player with new boots and equipment in the form of a deposit, with the club taking his passport until the deposit was paid off. Khanamiryan scored on his debut against Wisła, and played the following game against Petrochemia Płock. Due to the club struggling to find housing arrangements the player and his wife stayed in the locker room. The player disappeared from Jagiellonia, taking with him valuable equipment from the club. While it is not totally known where Khanamiryan went after his time with Jagiellonia it was later known he had at least another two passports on him.

After his retirement Khanamiryan ran a taxi company called "Football" in the Armenian capital, Yerevan. Khanamiryan had three children. On 1 June 2016 Khanamiryan was stabbed, later dying in hospital. It was discovered that his murderer, Vahram Veranyan, had been having an affair with Khanamiryan's wife.
