= Mirosław Głos =

Polish footballer

Personal information
- Date of birth: 20 January 1953
- Place of birth: Sopot, Poland
- Date of death: 16 June 2020 (aged 67)
- Place of death: Gdańsk, Poland
- Position: Midfielder

Senior career*
Years	Team	Apps	(Gls)
1969–1973	MRKS Gdańsk		
1973	Lechia Gdańsk		
1973–1974	MRKS Gdańsk		
1975–1977	Lechia Gdańsk	18	(0)
1977–1984	MRKS Gdańsk		
- * Club domestic league appearances and goals

Mirosław Głos (20 January 1953 – 16 June 2020) was a Polish footballer who played as a midfielder. Głos spent his entire 15-year career playing between MRKS Gdańsk and Lechia Gdańsk.

== Biography ==
Głos began his career at MRKS Gdańsk in 1969, the same year as the founding of the MRKS Gdańsk team after a merger between Portowiec Gdańsk and Motława Gdańsk. He spent 4 years with MRKS before joining Lechia Gdańsk, who were playing in the II liga, the second tier of Polish football. However, his first spell with Lechia did not last long, and he was kicked off the team after disciplinary issues during the summer training camp, returning to MRKS.

After a season playing with MRKS, and with Ryszard Kulesza leaving his role as Lechia manager, Głos was given another opportunity with Lechia midway through the following season. He made his Lechia debut in an away match against Warta Poznań, starting the match as Lechia went on to draw 0–0. Głos went on to make 11 league appearances in the second half of the season as he became a starter for the club. Over the following two seasons Głos would go on to make a further 7 league appearances, before moving on in 1977. Over his two and a half year spell with Lechia, he made 19 appearances in all competitions.

Głos returned to MRKS during the summer of 1977. He spent the next seven seasons with MRKS before retiring. His final appearance before hanging up his boots was to take part in an intra-Lechia friendly, featuring for the Lechia II side. In 2019, Głos played in a friendly celebrating MRKS Gdańsk's 50th birthday. He played for MRKS Gdańsk alongside his son, Dariusz Głos, who also played for Lechia Gdańsk during his career.

On 16 June 2020, Głos died aged 67. He was buried in the Nowy Port Cemetery.
