= Ryszard Szyndlar =

Polish footballer

Personal information
- Full name: Ryszard Szyndlar
- Date of birth: 13 March 1934
- Place of birth: Gdynia, Poland
- Date of death: 27 September 1998 (aged 64)
- Place of death: Gdynia, Poland
- Height: 1.69 m (5 ft 7 in)
- Position: Defender

Senior career*
Years	Team	Apps	(Gls)
–1955	Grom Gdynia		
1955–1957	Flota Gdynia		
1957	Gedania Gdańsk		
1958–1963	Lechia Gdańsk	113	(1)
- * Club domestic league appearances and goals

Ryszard Szyndlar (13 March 1934 – 27 September 1998) was a Polish footballer who played as a defender.

== Football ==
Born in Gdynia, Szyndlar started playing football with his local side Grom Gdynia, playing with the team until 1955. After his time with Grom he had short spells with Flota Gdynia and Gedania Gdańsk before joining Lechia Gdańsk in 1958. He made his Lechia debut on 23 March 1958 playing in the win against Zagłębie Sosnowiec. Over the next six seasons Szyndlar became a regular in the Lechia defence, making a total of 113 appearances and scoring 1 goal in Poland's top division, and being among an elite group to have reached the milestone of 100 appearances in the top division for Lechia. In total for Lechia he made 117 appearances and scored 1 goal in all competitions before retiring from playing in 1963.
