= Marek Bartosiak =

Polish footballer

Personal information
- Full name: Marek Bartosiak
- Date of birth: 30 May 1948 (age 78)
- Place of birth: Poland
- Position: Midfielder

Senior career*
Years	Team	Apps	(Gls)
1969–1974	Lechia Gdańsk	45	(18)
- MRKS Gdańsk
- * Club domestic league appearances and goals

Marek Bartosiak (born 30 May 1948) is a Polish former footballer who played as a midfielder for Lechia Gdańsk and MRKS Gdańsk. With Lechia he played in the second and third tiers of Polish football.

== Biography ==
Bartosiak made his Lechia debut on 17 August 1969 against Pogoń Barlinek in a 3–0 win, a game in which he also scored his first professional goal. For his first 3 years with Lechia, Bartosiak played well but was unable to secure a starting position, playing 25 times in those 3 seasons scoring 15 goals in that time. During the 1971–72 III liga season Bartosiak was part of the team that won the league, ensuring promotion to the II liga. In the II liga, the second tier of Polish football, Bartosiak still continued his good form scoring 3 times in 9 games. In his final season with Lechia, Bartosiak played in 11 games, 9 in the league and 2 in the Polish Cup, but failed to find the net in either of those games. In total during his five seasons with Lechia he played 45 times and scored 18 goals. After his time with Lechia, Bartosiak played with MRKS Gdańsk.

== Honours ==
Lechia Gdańsk

- III liga (Poznań group): 1971–72
