= Tadeusz Krystyniak =

Polish footballer

Personal information
- Full name: Tadeusz Krystyniak
- Date of birth: 7 September 1951 (age 75)
- Place of birth: Szczecin, Poland
- Height: 1.78 m (5 ft 10 in)
- Positions: Defender; midfielder

Youth career
- 1961–1969: Arkonia Szczecin

Senior career*
Years	Team	Apps	(Gls)
1969–1974	Arkonia Szczecin		
1974–1975	Stal Stocznia Szczecin		
1975–1980	Arka Gdynia	45	(2)
1980–1981	Lechia Gdańsk	31	(3)
- * Club domestic league appearances and goals

Tadeusz Krystyniak (born 7 September 1951) is a Polish former professional footballer who played as a defender and midfielder.

== Career ==
Krystyniak began his career playing with Arkonia Szczecin, with whom he progressed through the club's academy. Krystyniak spent five seasons with Arkonia before moving to city rivals Stal Stocznia Szczecin for a season.

His next move saw him playing with II liga side Arka Gdynia. In his first season with Arka, he helped them win promotion by winning the 1975–76 II liga. After promotion, Arka played in the I liga, the top division of Polish football. Over the course of four seasons, he played in 45 top division matches for Arka, scoring 2 goals.

During the 1978–79 season, when Krystyniak was having his greatest season with Arka, making 24 league appearances and scoring two league goals, Arka were also having success in the Polish Cup, reaching the final. In the final of the cup, Arka faced Wisła Kraków. Krystyniak was subbed on for Jerzy Zawiślan on the 35th minute, with Arka behind 1–0. They equalised early in the second half, with Krystyniak getting Arka's second, and ultimately the winning goal from the penalty spot on the 59th minute. This secured Arka's first piece of silverware in the club's history.

Arka's success in the cup meant that they were to play in a European competition for the first time. They were drawn against Bulgarian side Beroe Stara Zagora in the UEFA Cup Winners' Cup. Krystyniak played once in Europe, playing in the home leg of the match which saw Arka securing a 3–2 victory. He made 51 appearances for Arka in the I liga, Polish Cup, and in Europe during his time with the club.

After five successful seasons with Arka, he joined their rivals Lechia Gdańsk in the II liga. He made his Lechia debut on 23 August 1980 against Stilon Gorzów in a 1–1 home draw. With Lechia, he was more commonly featured in the first team, making a total of 31 league games during his 18-month spell for the club. In total, he made 34 appearances and scored three goals for Lechia in all competitions. After retiring from football, Krystyniak moved to Norway.

== Honours ==
Arka Gdynia

- II liga North: 1975–76
- Polish Cup: 1978–79
