= Józef Rogacki (footballer) =

Polish footballer

Personal information
- Date of birth: 18 March 1948
- Place of birth: Poznań, Poland
- Date of death: 30 October 2015 (aged 67)
- Place of death: Gdańsk, Poland
- Position: Forward

Youth career
- –1966: MRKS Gdańsk

Senior career*
| Years | Team | Apps | (Gls) |
| 1967–1969 | Lechia Gdańsk | 14 | (6) |
| 1969–1971 | Flota Gdynia | | |
| 1971–1974 | Lechia Gdańsk | 55 | (1) |
| 1974–1975 | MRKS Gdańsk | | |
- * Club domestic league appearances and goals

Józef Rogacki (18 March 1948 - 30 October 2015) was a Polish footballer who played as a forward. His career was spent playing for teams in the Tricity area of Poland. His career was spent in the Polish second and third divisions.

== Biography ==
Rogacki started his career playing with the youth sides of MRKS Gdańsk until 1966. He joined Lechia Gdańsk in 1967 and spent two years with the club, making a total of 14 appearances and scoring 6 goals for the club during this time in the II liga and III liga. He then spent two seasons with Flota Gdynia, before returning again to Lechia. He made a further 55 league appearances and scoring one goal over the next three seasons, and making a combined total of 73 appearances and scoring 7 goals during his time at Lechia. For the 1974–75 season he returned to the club where his footballing journey started, MRKS Gdańsk, retiring from playing football at the end of the season.

He had at least one child, a daughter called Anna who also played football. He died on 30 October 2015 and is buried in the Łostowicki cemetery.

== Honours ==
Lechia Gdańsk

- III Liga (g. IV): 1971–72
