= Paweł Żuk (footballer, born 1985) =

Polish footballer

Personal information
- Full name: Paweł Żuk
- Date of birth: 5 May 1985 (age 41)
- Place of birth: Gdańsk, Poland
- Height: 1.80 m (5 ft 11 in)
- Position: Midfielder

Team information
- Current team: GTS Goszyn
- Number: 33

Youth career
- –2003: Lechia Gdańsk

Senior career*
| Years | Team | Apps | (Gls) |
| 2003–2007 | Lechia Gdańsk | 93 | (9) |
| 2007–2010 | Kaszubia Kościerzyna | 94 | (3) |
| 2011 | Orkan Rumia | 6 | (0) |
| 2011–2019 | GTS Kolbudy | 209 | (16) |
| 2019– | GTS Goszyn | 46 | (8) |
- * Club domestic league appearances and goals as of 4 October 2021

Paweł Żuk (born 3 April 1983) is a Polish midfielder who plays for GTS Goszyn. He has spent his whole career playing for teams in the Pomeranian area, playing in Gdańsk, Kościerzyna, Rumia, Kolbudy and Goszyn.

== Football ==
Born in Gdańsk Żuk started playing in the youth sides for Lechia Gdańsk. He made his Lechia debut in the regional cup against KS Dziemiany, playing 44 minutes as the team won 8-2. He made his league debut the following season, starting the game as Lechia beat Powiśle Dzierzgoń 3-1. Żuk's introduction to the Lechia squad coincided with the team having to start in the sixth tier due to the failed merger of Lechia-Polonia Gdańsk with Lechia and Polonia Gdańsk. Żuk's debut came while Lechia were in the fifth tier. During his time with Lechia, the team won promotion into the second tier. In total he was involved in three promotions during his 5 seasons, playing a total of 102 appearances and scored 10 goals in all competitions. In his final season Żuk struggled to stake a claim for a starting position and often found himself playing as a substitute. His final appearance for Lechia was a defeat against Stal Stalowa Wola. After his time with Lechia Żuk joined Kaszubia Kościerzyna in 2007, with whom he spent 3 1/2 seasons playing 94 games during that time. After Kaszubia he had a brief spell with Orkan Rumia, before joining GTS Kolbudy for the start of the 2011–12 season. His time at Kolbudy was the most successful of his career, spending 8 seasons with the club and playing more than 200 games in the league. Despite mainly playing as a defensive midfielder, Żuk scored a hattrick in a 7-0 win over Sokół Wyczechy. Over the summer in 2019 he joined GTS Goszyn.

== Honours ==
=== Lechia Gdańsk ===
- III liga (group II) (third tier)
  - Winners (1): 2004-05
- IV liga (pomeranian group) (fourth tier)
  - Winners (1): 2003-04
- Liga okręgowa (group Gdańsk II) (fifth tier)
  - Winners (1): 2002-03
