= Zygmunt Adamczyk =

Polish footballer (1923–1985)

Personal information
- Full name: Zygmunt Adamczyk
- Date of birth: 1 May 1923
- Place of birth: Porąbki, Wieluń, Poland
- Date of death: 19 July 1985 (aged 62)
- Place of death: Gdańsk, Poland
- Height: 1.74 m (5 ft 9 in)
- Position: Forward

Senior career*
Years	Team	Apps	(Gls)
–1945	Stalowa Wola		
1945	Płomień Nowy Port		
1945–1949	Gedania Gdańsk		
1949–1950	Lechia Gdańsk	1	(0)
- * Club domestic league appearances and goals

Zygmunt Adamczyk (1 May 1923 – 19 July 1985) was a former Polish footballer who played as a forward. During the interwar years Adamczyk played in Stalowa Wola. After World War Two finished, he moved to Gdańsk briefly playing with Płomień Nowy Port before joining Gedania Gdańsk, where he spent a total of 4 years with Gedania. He is then documented to have played for Lechia Gdańsk in 1949, making one appearance for the club in the I liga. His only appearance in the top flight of Polish football came on 10 April 1949 in a 3–0 defeat to Polonia Warsaw. His brother, Roman Adamczyk, also played with Adamczyk for Płomień Nowy Port, Gedania Gdańsk, and Lechia Gdańsk.
