= Józef Pokorski =

Polish footballer

Personal information
- Full name: Józef Pokorski
- Date of birth: 10 August 1922
- Place of birth: Chorzów, Poland
- Date of death: 29 July 1980 (aged 57)
- Place of death: Chorzów, Poland
- Height: 1.83 m (6 ft 0 in)
- Position: Goalkeeper

Senior career*
Years	Team	Apps	(Gls)
1934–1938	RKS Hajduki		
1939–1941	Kresy Chorzów		
1946	Kresy Chorzów		
1946–1949	Lechia Gdańsk	24	(0)
1949–1950	Górnik Katowice		
1951	Lech Poznań	7	(0)
1952–1953	Górnik Katowice		
1953–1954	Gwardia Słupsk		
1955–1956	KS Chełmek		
- * Club domestic league appearances and goals

Józef Pokorski (10 August 1922 – 29 July 1980) was a Polish footballer who played as a goalkeeper. He is currently recognized as the highest goal scoring Polish goalkeeper, with five goals.

== Biography ==
Józef Pokorski is known to have started playing with RKS Hajduki, most likely in their youth sides before joining Kresy Chorzów and playing with the club during the outbreak of World War II. After the war he returned back to Kresy Chorzów before shortly moving to Lechia Gdańsk. At Lechia he became well known for his penalty taking abilities and scored 5 penalties in playoffs for Lechia. He was among the team in their first ever season in the I liga. With Lechia he made 50 appearances and scored 5 goals in all competitions. After Lechia he had a short spell with Górnik Katowice before returning to the I liga with Lech Poznań, making a further 7 appearances in Poland's top division. After Lech he had spells with Górnik Katowice, Gwardia Słupsk and KS Chełmek before retiring in 1956.

== See also ==
- List of goalscoring goalkeepers
