= Grzegorz Łazarek =

Polish footballer (1964–2018)

Personal information
- Date of birth: 8 December 1964
- Place of birth: Łódź, Poland
- Date of death: 14 January 2018 (aged 53)
- Place of death: Warsaw, Poland
- Height: 1.78 m (5 ft 10 in)
- Position: Midfielder

Youth career
- 1969–1981: Lechia Gdańsk

Senior career*
Years	Team	Apps	(Gls)
1981–1985	Lech Poznań	13	(0)
1985–1988	Lechia Gdańsk	48	(1)
1988–1991	Gwardia Warsaw	16	(0)
Total		77	(1)

International career
1982	Poland U17	2	(0)
- * Club domestic league appearances and goals

Grzegorz Łazarek (8 December 1964 – 14 January 2018) was a Polish footballer who played as a midfielder. He was the son of the former Poland national team manager Wojciech Łazarek.

== Honours ==
Lech Poznań

- Ekstraklasa: 1982–83, 1983–84
- Polish Cup: 1983–84
