= Eligiusz Gwoździński =

Polish footballer (1927–2005)

Personal information
- Full name: Eligiusz Gwoździński
- Date of birth: 21 May 1927
- Place of birth: Łódź, Poland
- Date of death: 9 February 2005 (aged 77)
- Place of death: Łódź, Poland
- Height: 1.65 m (5 ft 5 in)
- Position: Forward

Senior career*
Years	Team	Apps	(Gls)
1945	Baltia Gdańsk	2	(0)
1946–1951	ŁKS Łódź	19	(6)
- * Club domestic league appearances and goals

Eligiusz Gwoździński (21 May 1927 – 9 February 2005) was a former Polish footballer who played as a forward. During his playing career it is known that Gwoździński played for Baltia Gdańsk (now known as Lechia Gdańsk), being a part of the clubs first ever official game. He then played for his hometown club, ŁKS Łódź, where Gwoździński had the most success making 14 appearances for the club in the I liga.
