= Janusz Dobosz =

Polish footballer

Personal information
- Full name: Janusz Dobosz
- Date of birth: 23 January 1936
- Place of birth: Radom, Poland
- Date of death: 11 April 2002 (aged 66)
- Place of death: Radom, Poland
- Height: 1.77 m (5 ft 10 in)
- Position: Midfielder

Senior career*
Years	Team	Apps	(Gls)
- Bron Radom
1960	Lechia Gdańsk	1	(0)
- * Club domestic league appearances and goals

Janusz Dobosz (23 January 1936 – 11 April 2002) was a footballer who played as a midfielder. Being born in Radom, Dobosz played for his local team Bron Radom, being listed as one of the club's all time best players in 2016, the club's 70th anniversary. In 1960 he played for Lechia Gdańsk in the I liga, Poland's top division. He made his Lechia debut on 11 May 1960 in a 3-1 defeat against Odra Opole. He died in Radom on 11 April 2002, aged 66.
