= Roman Adamczyk =

Polish footballer

Personal information
- Full name: Roman Adamczyk
- Date of birth: 4 April 1925
- Place of birth: Porąbki, Wieluń, Poland
- Date of death: 19 October 1988 (aged 63)
- Place of death: Katowice, Poland
- Height: 1.70 m (5 ft 7 in)
- Position: Midfielder

Senior career*
Years	Team	Apps	(Gls)
1945	Płomień Nowy Port		
1945–1949	Gedania Gdańsk		
1949–1950	Lechia Gdańsk	2	(0)
1950–1951	AZS Gdańsk		
- * Club domestic league appearances and goals

Roman Adamczyk (4 April 1925 – 19 October 1988) was a Polish footballer who played as a midfielder. During World War Two Adamczyk was involved with the Polish resistance, for which he was awarded the Partisan Cross after the wars conclusion. After the war, Adamczyk moved to Gdańsk and started playing football with Płomień Nowy Port, spending a short time with the club before joining Gedania Gdańsk for 4 years. In 1949 Adamczyk is documented to have joined Lechia Gdańsk, playing for the club in the league in both 1949 and 1950. He made one appearance for the club in the I liga. His only appearance in the top flight of Polish football came on 10 April 1949 in a 3–0 defeat to Polonia Warsaw with his only other appearance, also being a defeat, coming against Pomeranian Toruń. After his stint with Lechia he spent two seasons with AZS Gdańsk before he stopped playing football. His brother, Zygmunt Adamczyk, also played with Adamczyk for Płomień Nowy Port, Gedania Gdańsk, and Lechia Gdańsk.

== Awards ==
- Partisan Cross
- Order of Polonia Restituta
