= Stefan Lasota =

Polish footballer

Personal information
- Full name: Stefan Paweł Lasota
- Date of birth: 20 December 1910
- Place of birth: Chmielnik, Austria-Hungary
- Date of death: 28 April 1976 (aged 65)
- Place of death: Gdańsk, Poland
- Height: 1.78 m (5 ft 10 in)
- Position: Defender

Youth career
- 1925–1929: Cracovia

Senior career*
Years	Team	Apps	(Gls)
1929–1939	Cracovia	154	(2)
1945–1947	BOP Baltia Gdańsk	1	(0)
Total		155	(2)

International career
1932	Poland	1	(0)
- * Club domestic league appearances and goals

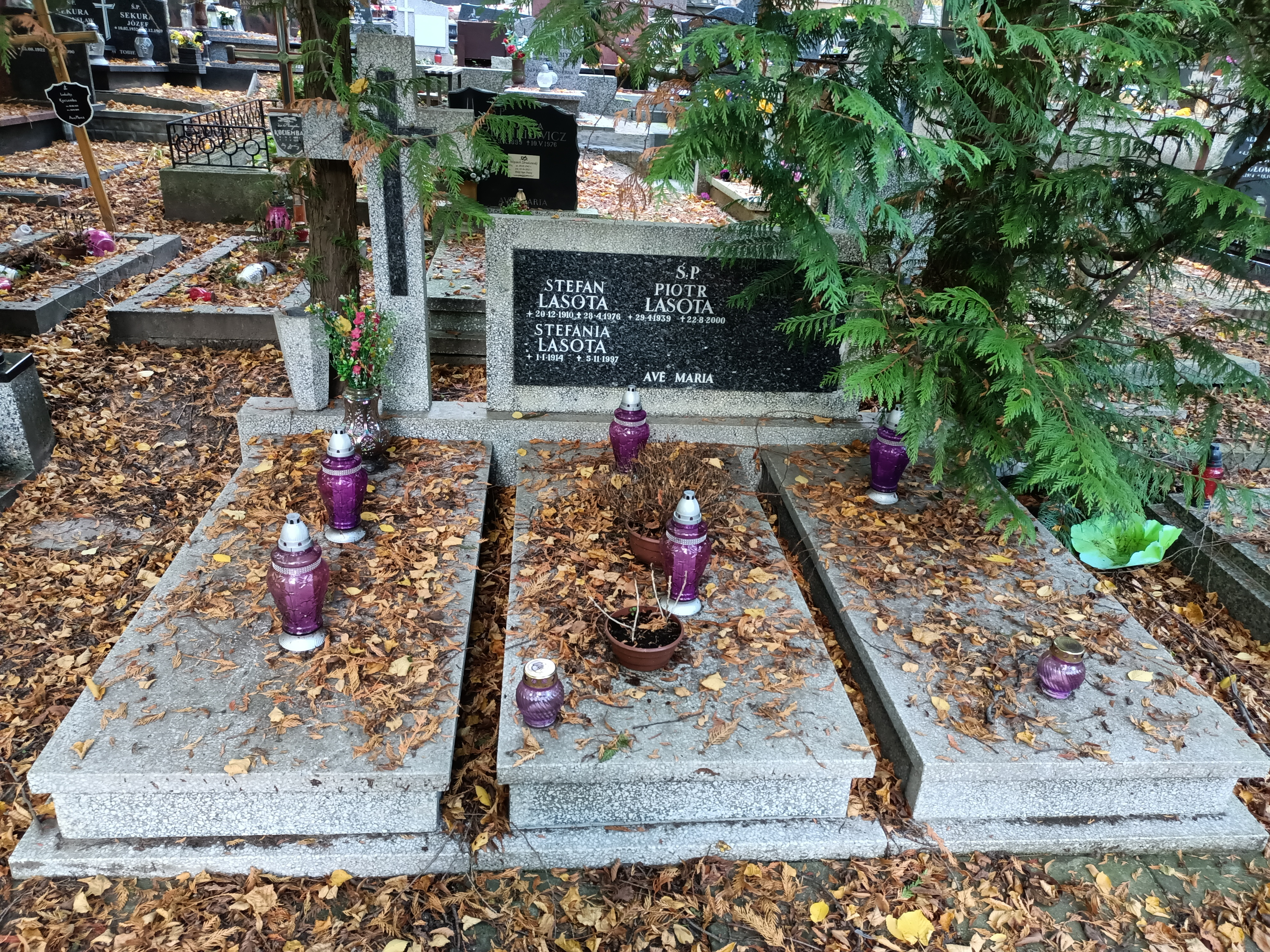
Stefan Lasota's grave at the municipal cemetery in Sopot

Stefan Paweł Lasota (20 December 1910 – 28 April 1976) was a Polish footballer who played as a defender.

== Career ==
Lasota started his career with the youth sides of Cracovia, progressing to the first team. Lasota played 10 years with the Cracovia first team, playing a total of 154 league appearances and scoring 2 goals. During his time with Cracovia he was part of the teams who won the I liga in 1930, 1932 and 1937, also finishing runners up in 1934. The start of the second World War put Lasota's playing career on hold. At the end of the year who joined newly formed BOP Baltia Gdańsk (later known as "Lechia Gdańsk") in 1945. While contracted to the club until 1947 he only played one game for Lechia, in a 5–3 win over KS Milityjny Gdańsk in 1945. After ending his playing career with Lechia, he held positions as a coach with Cracovia II, Lechia Gdańsk, KS Chełmek, Burza Wrocław, Unia Tarnów, Wisłoka Dębica, and Skra Warsaw.

=== International career ===
Lasota's only international appearance came for Poland on 2 October 1932 against Latvia. Lasota played in the first half as Poland won the game 2–1.

== Honours ==
Cracovia

- Ekstraklasa: 1930, 1932, 1937
