= Tricity Derby =

Football matches between Arka Gdynia and Lechia Gdańsk

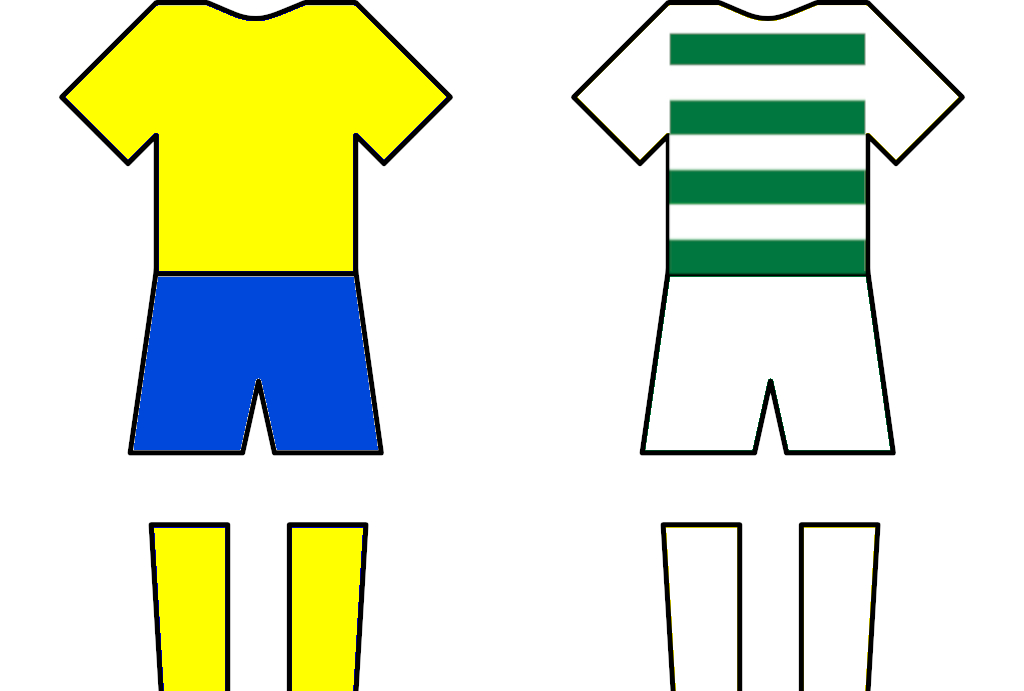
- The typical colours worn by Arka (left) and Lechia (right)
- Location: Tricity, Poland
- Teams: Arka Gdynia; Lechia Gdańsk
- First meeting: 2 September 1964; I liga Lechia 2–1 Arka
- Latest meeting: 18 October 2026; I liga Lechia 2–1 Arka
- Stadiums: Stadion Miejski in Gdynia (Arka); Polsat Plus Arena Gdańsk (Lechia)

Statistics
- Total meetings: 49
- Most wins: Lechia (20)
- Top scorer: Flávio Paixão (10)
- All-time series: Arka: 12; Drawn: 17; Lechia: 20
- Largest victory: Lechia 3–0 Arka; I liga (30 October 1983); Arka 1–4 Lechia; I liga (20 June 1984); Lechia 3–0 Arka; I liga (12 September 1992); Arka 0–3 Lechia; II liga (19 October 1997)
- Largest goal scoring: Lechia 4–3 Arka; Ekstraklasa (31 May 2020)

The Tricity Derby (Polish: Derby Trójmiasta) is the name given to football matches between Arka Gdynia and Lechia Gdańsk, the two biggest teams in the Tricity area in Pomeranian Voivodeship, Poland. The derby splits the Tricity area, with Arka representing Gdynia, the northern part of the Tricity, while Lechia represent Gdańsk which covers the southern part of the Tricity.

The first meeting between the two clubs was in 1964, and has been contested a total of 49 times since then. Despite both teams having featured in the Ekstraklasa throughout their history, the first meeting between the two teams in the top flight happened in 2008. Lechia have been the more successful of the two teams, winning 20 of the contests compared to Arka's 12.

== Club head-to-head ==
Comparison of Arka and Lechia
Arka Gdynia		Teams	Lechia Gdańsk	
	1929	Year of formation	1945	
	2	Number of Polish Cups won	2	
	2	Number of Polish Super Cups won	2	
	17	Number of seasons in the Ekstraklasa (as of the 2026–27 season)	34	
	17 August 1974	Ekstraklasa debut	20 March 1949	
	7th	Highest finish in the Ekstraklasa	3rd	
-	0	Ekstraklasa top goalscorers	2	
-	2	European competition appearances	3	-
-	19 September 1979	European debut	14 September 1983	
-	36	Number of seasons in the second tier (as of the 2026–27 season)	37	-
-	1938	Second tier debut	1946	
-	I liga	Current league (2026–27)	I liga	-
-	Stadion Miejski	Stadium	Polsat Plus Arena Gdańsk	-

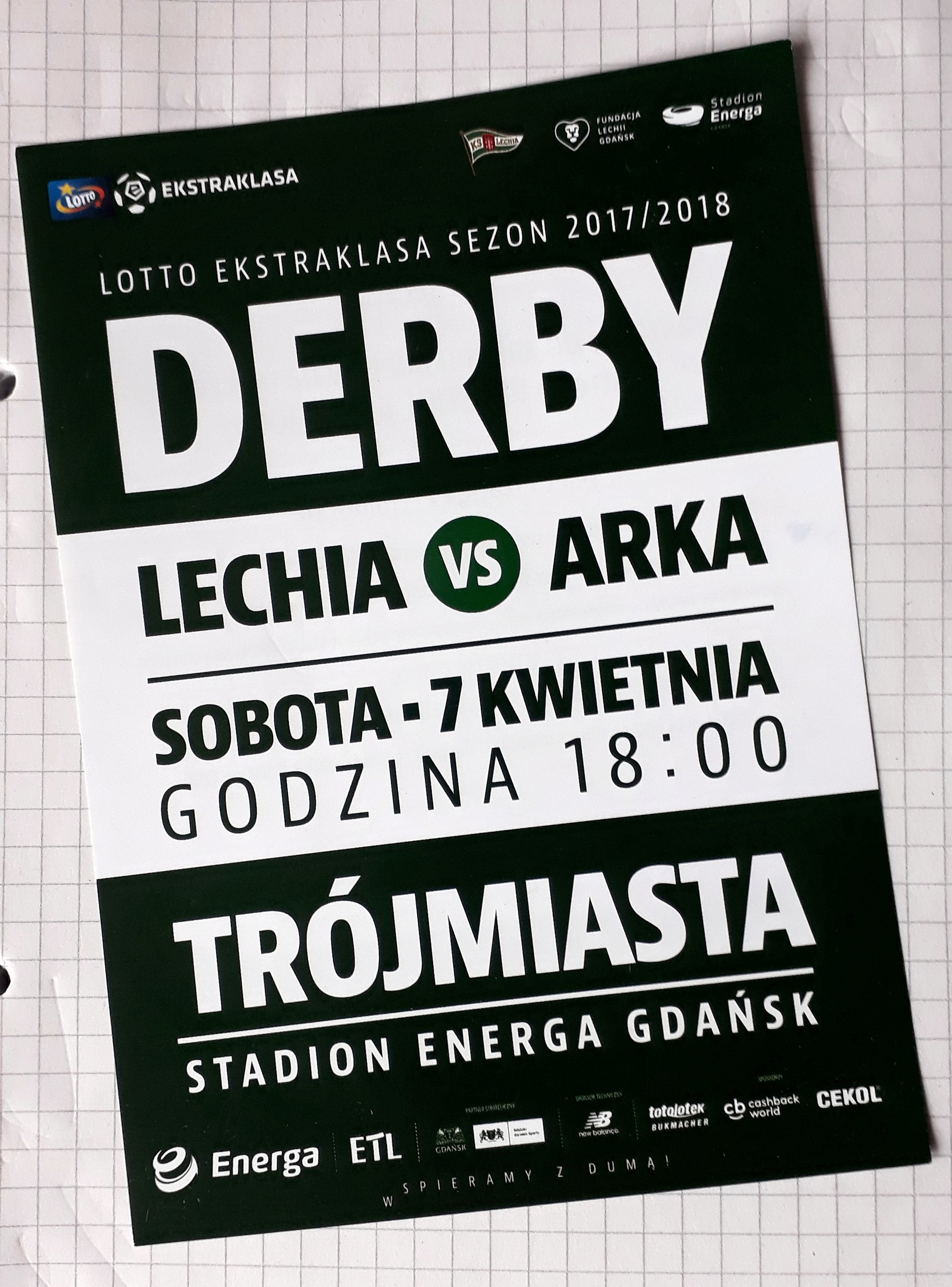
A flyer for the Lechia vs Arka derby game in 2018.

== All-time results ==
=== League ===
No.	Date	Home team	Score	Away team	League
1	2 September 1964	Lechia Gdańsk	2–1	Arka Gdynia	I liga
2	11 April 1965	Arka Gdynia	1–0	Lechia Gdańsk	I liga
3	15 September 1965	Lechia Gdańsk	1–2	Arka Gdynia	I liga
4	11 April 1966	Arka Gdynia	1–0	Lechia Gdańsk	I liga
5	17 September 1966	Lechia Gdańsk	0–0	Arka Gdynia	I liga
6	23 April 1967	Arka Gdynia	0–0	Lechia Gdańsk	I liga
7	18 August 1968	Arka Gdynia	0–0	Lechia Gdańsk	II liga
8	30 March 1969	Lechia Gdańsk	0–0	Arka Gdynia	II liga
9	20 August 1972	Arka Gdynia	1–0	Lechia Gdańsk	I liga
10	25 March 1973	Lechia Gdańsk	1–1	Arka Gdynia	I liga
11	1 September 1973	Arka Gdynia	0–0	Lechia Gdańsk	I liga
12	7 April 1974	Lechia Gdańsk	0–1	Arka Gdynia	I liga
13	9 November 1975	Lechia Gdańsk	1–1	Arka Gdynia	I liga
14	22 May 1976	Arka Gdynia	1–0	Lechia Gdańsk	I liga
15	30 October 1983	Lechia Gdańsk	3–0	Arka Gdynia	I liga
16	20 June 1984	Arka Gdynia	1–4	Lechia Gdańsk	I liga
17	12 September 1992	Lechia Gdańsk	3–0	Arka Gdynia	I liga
18	18 April 1993	Arka Gdynia	0–0	Lechia Gdańsk	I liga
19	17 October 1993	Arka Gdynia	0–0	Lechia Gdańsk	I liga
20	29 May 1994	Lechia Gdańsk	3–2	Arka Gdynia	I liga
21	27 August 1994	Arka Gdynia	1–0	Lechia Gdańsk	I liga
22	1 April 1995	Lechia Gdańsk	0–0	Arka Gdynia	I liga
23	19 October 1997	Arka Gdynia	0–3	Lechia Gdańsk	II liga
24	23 May 1998	Lechia Gdańsk	0–0	Arka Gdynia	II liga
25	10 October 2007	Lechia Gdańsk	0–0	Arka Gdynia	I liga
26	4 November 2007	Arka Gdynia	1–0	Lechia Gdańsk	I liga
27	3 October 2008	Arka Gdynia	0–1	Lechia Gdańsk	Ekstraklasa
28	25 April 2009	Lechia Gdańsk	2–1	Arka Gdynia	Ekstraklasa
29	31 July 2009	Lechia Gdańsk	2–1	Arka Gdynia	Ekstraklasa
30	25 November 2009	Arka Gdynia	1–2	Lechia Gdańsk	Ekstraklasa
31	17 October 2010	Lechia Gdańsk	1–0	Arka Gdynia	Ekstraklasa
32	1 May 2011	Arka Gdynia	2–2	Lechia Gdańsk	Ekstraklasa
33	30 October 2016	Arka Gdynia	1–1	Lechia Gdańsk	Ekstraklasa
34	17 April 2017	Lechia Gdańsk	2–1	Arka Gdynia	Ekstraklasa
35	3 November 2017	Arka Gdynia	0–1	Lechia Gdańsk	Ekstraklasa
36	7 April 2018	Lechia Gdańsk	4–2	Arka Gdynia	Ekstraklasa
37	13 April 2018	Arka Gdynia	1–2	Lechia Gdańsk	Ekstraklasa
38	27 October 2018	Lechia Gdańsk	2–1	Arka Gdynia	Ekstraklasa
39	2 April 2019	Arka Gdynia	0–0	Lechia Gdańsk	Ekstraklasa
40	20 October 2019	Arka Gdynia	2–2	Lechia Gdańsk	Ekstraklasa
41	31 May 2020	Lechia Gdańsk	4–3	Arka Gdynia	Ekstraklasa
42	24 November 2023	Arka Gdynia	1–0	Lechia Gdańsk	I liga
43	19 May 2024	Lechia Gdańsk	2–1	Arka Gdynia	I liga
44	24 August 2025	Lechia Gdańsk	1–0	Arka Gdynia	Ekstraklasa
45	27 February 2026	Arka Gdynia	2–2	Lechia Gdańsk	Ekstraklasa
46	18 October 2026	Lechia Gdańsk	2–1	Arka Gdynia	I liga

=== Cup competitions ===
No.	Date	Home team	Score	Away team	Cup
1	15 September 1993	Arka Gdynia	1–0	Lechia Gdańsk	Polish Cup
2	8 September 2008	Arka Gdynia	2–0	Lechia Gdańsk	Ekstraklasa Cup
3	18 November 2008	Lechia Gdańsk	0–1	Arka Gdynia	Ekstraklasa Cup

== Top goalscorers ==
No.	Name	Team	Goals
1	Flávio Paixão	Lechia Gdańsk	10
2	Jerzy Kruszczyński	Lechia Gdańsk	6
3	Marko Vejinović	Arka Gdynia	3
3	Marcin Wachowicz	Arka Gdynia	3
5	Paweł Buzała	Lechia Gdańsk	2
5	Mirosław Chodakowski	Arka Gdynia	2
5	Zygmunt Gadecki	Arka Gdynia	2
5	Mirosław Giruć	Lechia Gdańsk	2
5	Marcin Kaczmarek	Lechia Gdańsk	2
5	Grzegorz Niciński	Arka Gdynia	2
5	Marco Paixão	Lechia Gdańsk	2
5	Sławomir Peszko	Lechia Gdańsk	2
5	Karol Piątek	Lechia Gdańsk	2
5	Kacper Sezonienko	Lechia Gdańsk	2
5	Piotr Wiśniewski	Lechia Gdańsk	2
16	Bogdan Adamczyk	Lechia Gdańsk	1
16	Błażej Augustyn	Lechia Gdańsk	1
16	Andrzej Baczyński	Arka Gdynia	1
16	Adrian Błąd	Arka Gdynia	1
16	Janusz Charczuk	Lechia Gdańsk	1
16	Wojciech Cirkowski	Arka Gdynia	1
16	Kevin Dodaj	Lechia Gdańsk	1
16	Enrique Esqueda	Arka Gdynia	1
16	Czesław Filipiak	Arka Gdynia	1
16	Jacek Grembocki	Lechia Gdańsk	1
16	Vladislavs Gutkovskis	Arka Gdynia	1
16	Dominik Hofbauer	Arka Gdynia	1
16	Michał Janota	Arka Gdynia	1
16	Henryk Kalinowski	Arka Gdynia	1
16	Jerzy Kasalik	Lechia Gdańsk	1
16	Oskar Kubiak	Arka Gdynia	1
16	Dawid Kurminowski	Lechia Gdańsk	1
16	Tadas Labukas	Arka Gdynia	1
16	Ivans Lukjanovs	Lechia Gdańsk	1
16	Michał Marcjanik	Arka Gdynia	1
16	Camilo Mena	Lechia Gdańsk	1
16	Adam Mięciel	Arka Gdynia	1
16	Grzegorz Motyka	Lechia Gdańsk	1
16	Michał Nalepa	Arka Gdynia	1
16	Marc Navarro	Arka Gdynia	1
16	Damian Nawrocik	Arka Gdynia	1
16	Emil Noll	Arka Gdynia	1
16	Paweł Nowak	Lechia Gdańsk	1
16	Janusz Orczykowski	Lechia Gdańsk	1
16	Artur Shakh	Lechia Gdańsk	1
16	Alassane Sidibe	Arka Gdynia	1
16	Wojciech Sobczak	Arka Gdynia	1
16	Artur Sobiech	Lechia Gdańsk	1
16	Mateusz Szwoch	Arka Gdynia	1
16	Andrzej Szybalski	Arka Gdynia	1
16	Waldemar Tandecki	Arka Gdynia	1
16	Piotr Tomecki	Arka Gdynia	1
16	Przemysław Trytko	Arka Gdynia	1
16	Steven Vitória	Lechia Gdańsk	1
16	Luka Vučko	Lechia Gdańsk	1
16	Edmund Wierzyński	Lechia Gdańsk	1
16	Sławomir Wojciechowski	Lechia Gdańsk	1
16	Jakub Zabłocki	Lechia Gdańsk	1
16	Luka Zarandia	Arka Gdynia	1
16	Ivan Zhelizko	Lechia Gdańsk	1
16	Robert Zinko	Arka Gdynia	1
16	Łukasz Zwoliński	Lechia Gdańsk	1
16	Dariusz Żuraw	Arka Gdynia	1

=== Hat-tricks ===
No.	Name	Date	Team	Score	League
1	Jerzy Kruszczyński	30 October 1983	Lechia Gdańsk	3–0	I liga
2	Jerzy Kruszczyński	20 June 1984	Lechia Gdańsk	1–4	I liga
3	Flávio Paixão	7 April 2018	Lechia Gdańsk	4–2	Ekstraklasa
4	Flávio Paixão	31 May 2020	Lechia Gdańsk	4–3	Ekstraklasa

== Players who played for both clubs ==
- (Poland) Zygmunt Gadecki (Arka 1954–1956 & 1962–1967 & 1969–1970, Lechia 1957–1959 & 1960–1962)
- (Poland) Arkadiusz Bieńkowski (Lechia 1957–1958 & 1961, Arka 1962–1966)
- (Poland) Stanisław Jarząbek (Lechia 1958 & 1961, Arka 1962–1966)
- (Poland) Zbigniew Żemojtel (Lechia 1962–1968 & 1972–1976, Arka 1968–1972)
- (Poland) Jerzy Licbarski (Arka 1963–1966 & 1968–1969, Lechia 1969–1970)
- (Poland) Jan Erlich (Arka 1965–1967 & 1969–1973, Lechia 1978–1981)
- (Poland) Stanisław Burzyński (Lechia 1966–1969, Arka 1969–1975 & 1983–1985)
- (Poland) Waldemar Bajer (Arka 1967–1969, Lechia 1972–1973)
- (Poland) Andrzej Głownia (Lechia 1969–1970 & 1972–1980, Arka 1980–1981)
- (Poland) Andrzej Kaczmarek (Lechia 1969–1974, Arka 1974)
- (Poland) Zbigniew Kupcewicz (Lechia 1971–1972, Arka 1974–1978)
- (Poland) Zbigniew Pisula (Lechia 1972–1973, Arka 1975–1977)
- (Poland) Tomasz Korynt (Lechia 1972–1977, Arka 1977–1982)
- (Poland) Mirosław Tłokiński (Arka 1973–1975, Lechia 1975–1976)
- (Poland) Henryk Kliszewicz (Arka 1973–1975, Lechia 1975–1979)
- (Poland) Janusz Kupcewicz (Arka 1974–1982, Lechia 1986–1988)
- (Poland) Andrzej Głąbiński (Arka 1974–1979, Lechia 1980–1985)
- (Poland) Bogusław Kaczmarek (Lechia 1975–1977, Arka 1977–1981)
- (Poland) Stefan Kliński (Arka 1975–1978, Lechia 1978–1979)
- (Poland) Tadeusz Krystyniak (Arka 1975–1980, Lechia 1980–1981)
- (Poland) Andrzej Bikiewicz (Arka 1978–1980, Lechia 1981–1982)
- (Poland) Tadeusz Hennig (Arka 1978–1981, Lechia 1981–1982)
- (Poland) Waldemar Majcher (Lechia 1978–1981, Arka 1981–1982)
- (Poland) Ryszard Szewczyk (Arka 1978–1983 & 1990–1991, Lechia 1985–1988)
- (Poland) Jarosław Wiśniewski (Lechia 1980–1982 & 1984, Arka 1985–1986)
- (Poland) Jerzy Jabłoński (Lechia 1980–1982, Arka 1987)
- (Poland) Janusz Możejko (Arka 1980–1984, Lechia 1984–1986)
- (Poland) Dariusz Raczyński (Lechia 1980–1985, Arka 1987–1988)
- (Poland) Andrzej Wydrowski (Lechia 1980–1985, Arka 1985–1987)
- (Poland) Marek Kowalczyk (Lechia 1981–1986, Arka 1986–1987)
- (Poland) Andrzej Golecki (Arka 1983–1984, Lechia 1998–2000)
- (Poland) Mirosław Krajewski (Lechia 1984–1985, Arka 1985–1986)
- (Poland) Marek Ziółkowski (Lechia 1989–1991, Arka 1991–1995 & 1996–1997)
- (Poland) Tomasz Unton (Lechia 1988–1994 & 1995–1996, Arka 2001)
- (Poland) Robert Wilk (Lechia 1990, Arka 2002)
- (Poland) Waldemar Stachowiak (Lechia 1992–1994, Arka 1999–2000)
- (Poland) Dariusz Gładyś (Lechia 1992–1996, Arka 1997)
- (Poland) Piotr Filipik (Lechia 1993–1995, Arka 1998)
- (Poland) Maciej Kalkowski (Lechia 1993–1997 & 2004–2009, Arka 2001–2002 & 2003)
- (Poland) Sławomir Pietkiewicz (Lechia 1994–1996, Arka 1998 & 1999)
- (Poland) Marek Piątek (Lechia 1994–1997, Arka 1998–1999)
- (Poland) Piotr Burlikowski (Lechia 1995, Arka 2001–2002)
- (Poland) Sebastian Władacz (Lechia 1995–1998, Arka 1998–1999)
- (Poland) Maciej Lewna (Lechia 1995–2001, Arka 2001)
- (Poland) Adam Merchut (Lechia 1996–1999, Arka 2000–2002)
- (Poland) Michał Smarzyński (Lechia 1997, Arka 1998 & 2000–2003)
- (Poland) Marcin Pudysiak (Lechia 1997–1998, Arka 2002–2006)
- (Poland) Marcin Kaliński (Arka 1999–2000, Lechia 2001)
- (Poland) Mariusz Radoń (Arka 1999–2002, Lechia 2004–2005)
- (Poland) Karol Piątek (Lechia 2000–2002 & 2006–2010, Arka 2002)
- (Poland) Krzysztof Pilarz (Lechia 2000–2001, Arka 2017–2018)
- (Poland) Krzysztof Rusinek (Lechia 2000–2002 & 2004–2006, Arka 2002–2003)
- (Poland) Zbigniew Kobus (Arka 2001, Lechia 2003)
- (Poland) Michał Chamera (Lechia 2001, Arka 2003–2005)
- (Poland) Krzysztof Brede (Arka 2001, Lechia 2004–2008)
- (Poland) Kamil Biecke (Lechia 2004–2005, Arka 2005–2007)
- (Poland) Piotr Kasperkiewicz (Lechia 2007–2009, Arka 2011–2012)
- (Poland) Damian Rysiewski (Lechia 2009, Arka 2010–2011)
- (Poland) Łukasz Zwoliński (Arka 2012–2013, Lechia 2020–2023)
- (Poland) Aleksander Jagiełło (Lechia 2014, Arka 2014–2015)
- (Poland) Bartłomiej Pawłowski (Lechia 2014–2017, Arka 2026–present)
- (Poland) Michał Żebrakowski (Lechia 2015–2016, Arka 2017–2019)
- (Poland) Juliusz Letniowski (Lechia 2015–2017, Arka 2020–2021)
- (Afghanistan) Omran Haydary (Lechia 2020–2023, Arka 2022–2023)
- (Poland) Bolesław Kukliński

== Managers who managed both clubs ==
- (Poland) Czesław Bartolik (Lechia 1950–1953, Arka 1954–1955)
- (Poland) Tadeusz Foryś (Lechia 1954–1957, Arka 1956)
- (Poland) Henryk Serafin (Lechia 1959–1960, Arka 1961)
- (Poland) Piotr Nierychło (Lechia 1960–1961, Arka 1962)
- (Poland) Edward Brzozowski (Arka 1964–1965, Lechia 1967)
- (Poland) Grzegorz Polakow (Arka 1965–1971 & 1981 & 1995, Lechia 1976)
- (Poland) Jerzy Słaboszowski (Lechia 1970–1971, Arka 1971–1975)
- (Poland) Marian Geszke (Lechia 1976 & 1986–1987 & 1993–1994, Arka 1995)
- (Poland) Janusz Pekowski (Arka 1977, Lechia 1978–1979)
- (Poland) Jerzy Jastrzębowski (Lechia 1982–1984 & 1999–2000, 2003–2004, Arka 1987–1989)
- (Poland) Bogusław Kaczmarek (Lechia 1984–1992 & 2012–2013, Arka 2008)
- (Poland) Andrzej Bikiewicz (Arka 1986–1987 & 1989–1990, Lechia 1997–1998)
- (Poland) Stanisław Stachura (Lechia 1988–1989 & 1996 & 2000–2002, Arka 1993–1994)

== Local impact ==
Teams who have friendly relations with Arka Gdynia (yellow) and Lechia Gdańsk (green).

The Tricity derby has big impact on the local region with many teams fans having an allegiance with one of the two teams.

Arka Gdynia has sympathisers from Wisła Tczew, Kaszubia Kościerzyna, Gryf Wejherowo, Orkan Rumia, MKS Władysławowo, Orlęta Reda, Stolem Gniewino, Piast Człuchów and Zatoka Puck. The fans also have a friendship with fans of Gwardia Koszalin in the neighboring West Pomeranian Voivodeship.

Lechia Gdańsk has friendships and/or sympathisers from Chojniczanka Chojnice, Bytovia Bytów, Gryf Słupsk, Pomezania Malbork, Czarni Pruszcz Gdański, KP Starogard Gdański, Unia Tczew, Wierzyca Pelplin and Olimpia Sztum.
