= 1991–92 Polish Cup =

Puchar Polski

Tournament details
- Country: Poland

Final positions
- Champions: Miedź Legnica (1st title)
- Runners-up: Górnik Zabrze

Tournament statistics
- Matches played: 88

The 1991–92 Polish Cup was the 38th season of the annual Polish football knockout tournament. It began on 24 July 1991 with the first matches of the preliminary round and ended on 24 June 1992 with the Final. The winners qualified for the first round of the 1992–93 European Cup Winners' Cup.

GKS Katowice were the defending champions, having won their 2nd title in the previous season. Miedź Legnica won the final match 4–3 on penalties following a 1–1 draw after extra time, thus winning the first Polish Cup trophy in the club's history.

== Round of 32 ==
Team 1	Score	Team 2
Stal Stalowa Wola	2–1	Śląsk Wrocław
Stal Rzeszów	2–1 (a.e.t.)	Wisła Kraków
Górnik Złotoryja	0–4	Legia Warsaw
Resovia	0–2	Górnik Zabrze
Widzew Łódź	3–1	Hutnik Kraków
Polonia Chodzież	2–1	Igloopol Dębica
Korona Kielce	3–1 (a.e.t.)	Zagłębie Lubin
Hutnik Warsaw	3–1	Lech Poznań
Stilon Gorzów Wielkopolski	4–0	Zagłębie Sosnowiec
Polonia Bytom	1–4 (a.e.t.)	Ruch Chorzów
Zagłębie Wałbrzych	1–2	GKS Katowice
Miedź Legnica	3–2	Stal Mielec
Gwardia Warsaw	1–2	Olimpia Poznań
Pogoń Szczecin	2–3 (a.e.t.)	Zawisza Bydgoszcz
Jagiellonia Białystok	3–2	Motor Lublin
Raków Częstochowa	1–1 (a.e.t.) (3–4 p)	ŁKS Łódź

== Round of 16 ==
Team 1	Score	Team 2
Polonia Chodzież	2–2 (a.e.t.) (1–3 p)	Zawisza Bydgoszcz
Stal Stalowa Wola	2–0	Ruch Chorzów
Jagiellonia Białystok	1–3	Widzew Łódź
Miedź Legnica	1–0	Olimpia Poznań
Hutnik Warsaw	2–4	Stilon Gorzów Wielkopolski
Korona Kielce	0–1	ŁKS Łódź
Stal Rzeszów	1–0 (a.e.t.)	Legia Warsaw
GKS Katowice	0–0 (a.e.t.) (1–3 p)	Górnik Zabrze

== Quarterfinals ==
Team 1	Agg.	Team 2	1st leg	2nd leg
ŁKS Łódź	3–1	Stal Rzeszów	2–0	1–1
Stilon Gorzów Wielkopolski	1–0	Stal Stalowa Wola	0–0	1–0
Widzew Łódź	0–2	Górnik Zabrze	0–1	0–1
Miedź Legnica	4–3	Zawisza Bydgoszcz	2–1	2–2 (a.e.t.)

17 March 1992	ŁKS Łódź	2–0	Stal Rzeszów	Łódź
	Kruszankin 4' (pen.); Grad 56'

1 April 1992	Stal Rzeszów	1–1 (1–3 agg.)	ŁKS Łódź	Rzeszów
	Szeliga 32'		Traczyk 67'

18 March 1992	Stilon Gorzów Wielkopolski	0–0	Stal Stalowa Wola	Gorzów Wielkopolski
		RSSSF		Referee: Krzysztof Perek (Poznań)

31 March 1992	Stal Stalowa Wola	0–1 (0–1 agg.)	Stilon Gorzów Wielkopolski	Stalowa Wola
		RSSSF	Burzawa 56'	Stadium: Stadion MOSiR; Referee: Wit Żelazko (Warsaw)

18 March 1992	Widzew Łódź	0–1	Górnik Zabrze	Łódź
			Jegor 6' (pen.)

1 April 1992	Górnik Zabrze	1–0 (2–0 agg.)	Widzew Łódź	Zabrze
	Kraus 17' (pen.)

18 March 1992	Miedź Legnica	2–1	Zawisza Bydgoszcz	Legnica
	Wójcik 22'; Dyluś 35' (pen.)		Czyrek 2'

1 April 1992	Zawisza Bydgoszcz	2–2 (a.e.t.) (2–3 agg.)	Miedź Legnica	Bydgoszcz
	Kot 28'; Pasieka 73' (pen.)		Baziuk 2'; Wójcik 108'

== Semifinals ==
Team 1	Agg.	Team 2	1st leg	2nd leg
Miedź Legnica	4–1	Stilon Gorzów Wielkopolski	3–0	1–1
ŁKS Łódź	2–3	Górnik Zabrze	1–1	1–2 (a.e.t.)

20 May 1992	Miedź Legnica	3–0	Stilon Gorzów Wielkopolski	Legnica
	Dyluś 10', 47' (pen.); Cymbała 88'

10 June 1992	Stilon Gorzów Wielkopolski	1–1 (1–4 agg.)	Miedź Legnica	Gorzów Wielkopolski
	Burzawa 33'		Gierejkiewicz 23'

20 May 1992	ŁKS Łódź	1–1	Górnik Zabrze	Łódź
	Gałaj 70'		Kraus 86'

10 June 1992	Górnik Zabrze	2–1 (a.e.t.) (3–2 agg.)	ŁKS Łódź	Zabrze
	Staniek 16'; Orzeszek 107'		Kruszankin 28' (pen.)

== Final ==
24 June 1992
18:30 CEST (UTC+02:00)

Miedź Legnica	1–1 (a.e.t.)	Górnik Zabrze
Baziuk 79'		Jegor 9'
Penalties
Dyluś (penalty scored); Gierejkiewicz (penalty scored); Kochanek (penalty scored); Ciliński (penalty missed); Wójcik (penalty scored)	4–3	(penalty scored) Jegor; (penalty missed) Wałdoch; (penalty missed) Kraus; (penalty scored) Piotrowicz; (penalty scored) Staniek

Stadion Wojska Polskiego, Warsaw
Attendance: 3,500
Referee: Michał Listkiewicz (Warsaw)
