= Sadzawicki =

Sadzawicki (feminine: Sadzawicka; plural: Sadzawiccy) is a Polish surname. Notable people include:

- Dominik Sadzawicki (born 1994), Polish footballer
- Krzysztof Sadzawicki (born 1970), Polish footballer
