= Piotr Rajkiewicz =

Polish footballer

Personal information
- Date of birth: 31 December 1967 (age 58)
- Place of birth: Elbląg, Poland
- Height: 1.82 m (6 ft 0 in)
- Position: Defender

Senior career*
Years	Team	Apps	(Gls)
–1988	Olimpia Elbląg		
1989–1993	Gwardia Warsaw	81	(18)
1994	Widzew Łódź	4	(0)
1994–1995	Gwardia Warsaw		
1996	Olimpia-Lechia Gdańsk	16	(1)
1996	Lechia Gdańsk	10	(0)
1997–2001	Gwardia Warsaw		
2001–2002	KS Łomianki		
2002–2003	MGKS Tolkmicko		
2004	Mlexer Elbląg		
2013	Olimpia Elbląg III		
- * Club domestic league appearances and goals

Piotr Rajkiewicz (born 31 December 1967) is a Polish former professional footballer who played as a defender. He spent the majority of his career with Gwardia Warsaw, spending 9 seasons with the club across three different spells. He made a total of 20 appearances and scored one goal in Poland's top division with Widzew Łódź and Olimpia-Lechia Gdańsk.

== Biography ==
Born in Elbląg, Rajkiewicz started his career playing football with Olimpia Elbląg. Over the winter of 1989 he joined Gwardia Warsaw, who were playing in the II liga at the time. In his first full season with Gwardia, he played as a midfielder, playing 33 games and scoring 14 goals, finishing as the league's top scorer for that season. After this impressive goal scoring season, Rajkiewicz began to play in defence, the position in which he would play for the rest of his career. The following two seasons, he would make 48 more appearances, scoring 4 goals as Gwardia went on to suffer relegation. It is not known how many appearances Rajkiewicz made for Gwardia the following season, but it is known that while the team played in the II liga he made a total of 81 appearances and scored 18 goals.

In the spring of 1994, he joined I liga side Widzew Łódź, Rajkiewicz made his Widzew and I liga debut on 5 May 1994 against ŁKS Łódź in the Łódź Derby, with the game ending in a 0–0 draw. In total, Rajkiewicz would go on to make 4 appearances for Widzew, with all of his appearances coming off the bench. Rajkiewicz spent the following season with Gwardia Warsaw in the III liga, before returning to the top flight of Polish football with Olimpia-Lechia Gdańsk in 1996.

Olimpia-Lechia Gdańsk was a newly created team in the I liga, formed by a merger between Olimpia Poznań and Lechia Gdańsk and playing in Gdańsk. By the time he had joined Olimpia-Lechia, the team were already struggling in the league. Rajkiewicz made his debut on 4 March 1996 in the 2–1 defeat to Stomil Olsztyn. He would go on to make 16 appearances for the Olimpia-Lechia team with his first, and only goal in Poland's top division coming in the 1–0 win against Siarka Tarnobrzeg. Olimpia-Lechia Gdańsk ultimately suffered relegation to the II liga, and the Olimpia-Lechia team disbanded. The Lechia Gdańsk team, which had been used as the clubs official 'second team' for the previous season took the clubs place in the II liga instead, while a new Olimpia Poznań team was formed in the lower divisions. Rajkiewicz stayed in Gdańsk during this period and played the following season with Lechia Gdańsk. He made 12 appearances in the league for the club, moving once again during the winter break to return to Gwardia Warsaw.

He stayed with Gwardia Warsaw until 2001, during which time, Gwardia won their III liga group, but failed to be promoted to the II liga through the play-offs. Rajkiewicz would not play higher than the III liga again in his career, spending his final seasons playing for KS Łomianki, MGKS Tolkmicko, and Mlexer Elbląg. Retiring from professional football in 2004. Rajkiewicz would return to the club he started his career with in 2013, playing for the Olimpia Elbląg III team.

== Honours ==
Gwardia Warsaw

- III liga, group VII: 1997–98

Individual

- II liga top scorer: 1989–90 (14 goals)
