= Olimpia-Lechia Gdańsk =

Defunct Polish association football team

- Full name: Klub Piłkarski Olimpia-Lechia Gdańsk
- Founded: 1 July 1995; 31 years ago
- Dissolved: 31 June 1996; 30 years ago
- Ground: MOSiR Stadium
- Capacity: 12,244
- Chairman: Henryk Woźniak
- Manager: Hubert Kostka (1995-96); Stanisław Stachura (1996)
- 1995-96 Ekstraklasa: 16th
Home colours	Away colours	Third colours

Olimpia-Lechia Gdańsk was a short lived Polish association football club, created by a merger of Lechia Gdańsk and Olimpia Poznań, which played in the Ekstraklasa for the 1995–96 season.

== History ==
=== Pre-merger ===
==== Olimpia Poznań ====
Olimpia Poznań was created in 1945, owned by the Citizen's Militia. As a result of this the club was seen as being a "Gwardian" establishment which left the club poorly supported with fans choosing to follow either Lech Poznań or Warta Poznań. During the 1980s the club was a regular in the Ekstraklasa, however after the fall of communism in Poland in 1989 Olimpia lost a lot of its funding and fell into obscurity.

==== Lechia Gdańsk ====
Lechia Gdańsk were also created in 1945, Lechia's greatest success in the top flight came during the 1950s, when the club finished 3rd during the 1956 season. After spending the 1960s and 70's in the lower divisions, Lechia won the Polish Cup and the Polish Super Cup in 1983. After a spell back in the top flight, Lechia soon found themselves playing in the lower divisions once more.

=== Olimpia-Lechia Gdańsk ===
Many Lechia fans were unhappy with the merger, and wished to play solely under the Lechia Gdańsk name. However they hoped that if the Olimpia-Lechia Gdańsk team stayed in the top flight, they would drop Olimpia from the merger and once again become Lechia Gdańsk.

Olimpia-Lechia started the season well, getting 10 points from their opening 4 games. The season which started so well for Olimpia-Lechia soon started to turn negative. In the 5th game of the season GKS Katowice turned up to the Olimpia Poznań facility in Poznań (which wasn't being used Olimpia-Lechia for that season). As a result, Katowice were awarded the win despite the teams not playing a game. The team's fortunes got worse after this game and they started falling down the league table. By the time the season had come to the winter break, Olimpia-Lechia found themselves in the relegation zone. After the winter break Olimpia-Lechia's fortunes did not improve, and the team ended up finishing 16th and 2 points from safety.

After the season Lechia fans' original wishes came to pass. Olimpia left the merger, meaning that the original Lechia Gdańsk team who continued to play in the third tier for the 1995–96 season took the relegated Olimpia-Lechia team's place in the second division, with the team being renamed back to Lechia Gdańsk.

=== After 1996 ===
After the merger with Lechia, Olimpia's fortunes never returned to their glory days. The team continued to struggle and found themselves playing in the lowest tiers of Polish football. The team found it hard to gain fan support and much needed investment after neglect from their owners (the club was still owned by the police force, called Policja after 1989) and eventually the football section of the club was dissolved in 2005.

Lechia also continued to struggle after the merger, eventually having to merge again with another team, Polonia Gdańsk, this time creating Lechia-Polonia Gdańsk. This new merger broke off in 2001, sending both teams to the lowest tier of Polish football. After having to start from the bottom, Lechia's fortunes changed and they found themselves playing in the Ekstraklasa once again for the 2008/09 season. After 11 seasons of continuous top flight football Lechia won both the Polish Cup and the Polish Super Cup in 2019, leading to the team playing European football for only the second time in their history.

== Players ==
First-team squad 1995/96:

Note: Flags indicate national team as defined under FIFA eligibility rules; some limited exceptions apply. Players may hold more than one non-FIFA nationality.

No.	Pos.	Nation	Player
—	GK	POL	Dariusz Gładyś
—	GK	POL	Piotr Wojdyga
—	DF	POL	Jacek Grembocki
—	DF	POL	Marcin Janus
—	DF	POL	Igor Kozioł
—	DF	POL	Juliusz Kruszankin
—	DF	POL	Sławomir Matuk
—	DF	POL	Piotr Mosór
—	DF	POL	Grzegorz Motyka
—	DF	POL	Sebastian Nowak
—	DF	POL	Mariusz Pawlak
—	DF	POL	Piotr Rajkiewicz
—	DF	POL	Krzysztof Sadzawicki
—	MF	POL	Arkadiusz Bąk

No.	Pos.	Nation	Player
—	MF	POL	Marcin Ciliński
—	MF	POL	Jacek Dąbrowski
—	MF	POL	Marcin Kubsik
—	MF	POL	Andrzej Magowski
—	MF	POL	Rafał Ruta
—	MF	POL	Tomasz Unton
—	MF	POL	Kamil Kowalczyk
—	FW	POL	Piotr Burlikowski
—	FW	POL	Tomasz Dawidowski
—	FW	POL	Adam Grad
—	FW	POL	Grzegorz Król
—	FW	POL	Sławomir Suchomski
—	FW	GHA	Joseph Aziz
—	FW	GHA	Emmanuel Tetteh

== Stats ==
Top Goalscorer

Season	Player	Goals
1995–96	Emmanuel Tetteh	9

== Kits ==
During the 1995–96 season Olimpia–Lechia wore six different kits in total, made from three different kit manufacturers. For the first half of the season the home and away kits were produced by local sportsware manufacturer PJ Sport, with the club sponsor on the kit being Nata, with the home and away kits being the typical colours of Lechia Gdańsk, green and white. The third and fourth kits for the autumn round of games were blue and white kits, with the third shirt having black and white detailing, and the fourth kit having red and black detailing. The most likely reason for the blue and white Adidas kits is these were the kits worn and made for Olimpia Poznań, and thus the mergers attempt to keep the legacy of both clubs alive within the same team. The fourth shirt was notable for being used in the home game that season against Legia Warsaw. For the second half of the season the clubs kits were made by Kelme, with the clubs new main sponsor being Canal+, all four of the previous kits were dropped for the Kelme kits.

1995–96 Autumn home	1995–96 Autumn away	1995–96 Autumn third	1995–96 Autumn fourth	1995–96 Spring home kit	1995–96 Spring away kit
