= Marcin Ciliński =

Polish footballer

Personal information
- Full name: Marcin Ciliński
- Date of birth: 10 April 1968 (age 58)
- Place of birth: Bytom, Poland
- Height: 1.79 m (5 ft 10 in)
- Position: Midfielder

Team information
- Current team: Zagłębie Lubin U19 (assistant)

Youth career
- –1984: Polonia Bytom

Senior career*
Years	Team	Apps	(Gls)
1984–1985	Polonia Bytom	0	(0)
1985–1990	Zagłębie Lubin	43	(2)
1991–1992	Miedź Legnica		
1993–1995	Olimpia Poznań		
1995–1996	Olimpia-Lechia Gdańsk	26	(3)
1996–1997	Sokół Tychy	21	(0)
1997–1998	Śląsk Wrocław	24	(4)
1998–1999	Aluminium Konin	22	(2)
1999	BSC Young Boys	17	(0)
2000	FC Winterthur		
2000–2002	Górnik Polkowice	27	(3)
2002	Miedź Legnica		
2003	Nysa Zgorzelec		
2003	Włókniarz Mirsk		
2004–2007	BKS Bolesławiec		

Managerial career
- 2005–2008: BKS Bolesławiec (player-manager)
- 2008–2009: Prochowiczanka Prochowice
- 2009: Polonia Świdnica
- 2010–?: BKS Bolesławiec
- 2015–2023: Zagłębie Lubin (youth)
- * Club domestic league appearances and goals

Marcin Ciliński (born 10 April 1968) is a Polish football manager and former player who played as a midfielder who is currently the assistant manager of Zagłębie Lubin's under-19 team.

== Career ==
=== Early years ===
Born in Bytom, Ciliński started his career with the youth levels of Polonia Bytom progressing to play with the reserve team in 1984. He played with Polonia for one season.

=== Zagłębie Lubin ===
He moved to Zagłębie Lubin in 1985, playing one match in his first season. While at Zagłębie the team initially struggled in the I liga, finishing lower mid-table in his first 2 seasons being relegated in his third season with the club. Despite relegation Zagłębie saw a resurgence in the team, winning the II liga, finishing 2nd in their first season back in the top flight, and winning the I liga the season after. Ciliński played 5 times in the season Zagłębie won the Polish championship. In total Ciliński played 43 appearances in the top division for Zagłębie Lubin.

=== Miedź Legnica ===
Ciliński joined Miedź Legnica in the second half of the 1990–91 season. The 1991–92 saw Miedź reach the final of the Polish Cup, playing Górnik Zabrze in the final. Ciliński started in the final which ended in a 1-1 draw with Miedź winning in penalties 4-3.

=== Olimpia-Lechia Gdańsk ===
In 1993 he moved to play with Olimpia Poznań. In 1995 Olimpia Poznań and Lechia Gdańsk were involved in a merger to create the team Olimpia-Lechia Gdańsk with the Olimpia players having to move from Poznań to Gdańsk as a result. He made his Olimpia-Lechia debut on 29 July 1995 against Śląsk Wrocław. Over the course of the season he played 26 games scoring 3 goals as the team ended up being relegated from the top division.

=== Sokół Tychy ===
After Olimpia-Lechia's relegation Ciliński chose to stay in the I liga joining Sokół Tychy. The end result was the same as Sokół ended the season bottom of the league, with Ciliński making 21 appearances. After the season Sokół faced financial trouble due to relegation and disbanded the same year.

=== Later years ===
After his spell with Sokół he didn't play in the top division in Poland again, with most of his spells at other clubs lasting only one season. He spent the 1997–1998 season with Śląsk Wrocław, helping the team to finish third in the second tier joining Aluminium Konin the season after. Ciliński spent a year in Switzerland with BSC Young Boys and FC Winterthur. He returned to Poland in 2000 joining Górnik Polkowice finishing 3rd in the second tier in his first season with the club, failing to make an appearance during his second season at the club. He rejoined Miedź Legnica for a short spell, ending his playing career in the lower divisions with Nysa Zgorzelec and Włókniarz Mirsk.

=== Coaching career ===
He started his coaching career with BKS Bolesławiec in 2004 staying with the club until 2007. He has had a spell as head coach with Prochowiczanka Prochowice. In 2017, Ciliński became Zagłębie Lubin under-18's manager.

== Honours ==
Zagłębie Lubin

- Ekstraklasa: 1990–91
- II liga: 1988–89

Miedź Legnica

- Polish Cup: 1991–92
