= Arkadiusz Rojek =

Polish footballer

Personal information
- Full name: Arkadiusz Rojek
- Date of birth: 6 July 1972 (age 54)
- Place of birth: Gdańsk, Poland
- Height: 1.80 m (5 ft 11 in)
- Positions: Defender; forward

Youth career
- –1989: Lechia Gdańsk

Senior career*
Years	Team	Apps	(Gls)
1989–1991	Lechia Gdańsk	4	(0)
1991	Wisła Tczew		
1992–1998	Lechia Gdańsk	4	(0)
1999	Bałtyk Gdynia	8	(0)
1999–2000	Lechia-Polonia Gdańsk	0	(0)
2000–2001	Bałtyk Gdynia	0	(0)
2001–2003	P.P. Borgo Grappa		
2004–2005	Unia Tczew	3	(0)

Managerial career
- 2016: KP Zaspa Gdańsk
- * Club domestic league appearances and goals

Arkadiusz Rojek (born 6 July 1972) was a Polish football player who spent different points of his career playing as a defender and as a forward.

== Biography ==
Born in Gdańsk, Rojek started playing with his local team Lechia Gdańsk. After progressing through the Lechia youth teams he made his senior debut on 4 October 1989 against Igloopol Dębica. In his first season with Lechia he made 4 league appearances in the II liga, Poland's second division. After not making any appearances the following season Rojek joined Wisła Tczew for a short six-month spell before returning to Lechia. He spent seven seasons with Lechia, but rarely found himself in the squad during this time. The 1994–95 season is the season in which he made the most appearances during this time, making 3 appearances in the league. His final appearance came for the club the following season, this time in the III liga, Poland's third division. In 1999 he joined Bałtyk Gdynia, during which time he made 8 appearances in his six months with the club. Rojek once again returned to Lechia, during this time the club was known as Lechia-Polonia Gdańsk due to a merger between Lechia Gdańsk and Polonia Gdańsk, however during this season Rojek did not feature for the first team. In total for Lechia he spent 9 seasons with the club and made 9 appearances in all competitions. He left Lechia for a final time and returned to Bałtyk Gdynia for the 2000–01 season, however it is not documented that he made any appearances during his second spell with the club. In 2001 Rojek moved to Italy and spent two seasons with Polisportiva Parrocchiale Borgo Grappa playing with the Italian club until 2003. In 2005 he returned to Poland and played the second half of the season with Unia Tczew, making 3 appearances before his retirement from football at the end of the season.

In 2016, Rojek took on his first management role as the manager of KP Zaspa Gdańsk. However, he did not remain in this position for long, leaving the job later that same year.
