= Krzysztof Sadzawicki =

Polish footballer

Personal information
- Date of birth: 20 February 1970 (age 56)
- Place of birth: Boleslaw, Poland
- Height: 1.76 m (5 ft 9 in)
- Position: Defender

Youth career
- Bukowianka Stare Bukowno

Senior career*
Years	Team	Apps	(Gls)
1988–1989	Gwarek Zabrze		
1989	Górnik Knurów		
1990–1995	Olimpia Poznań		
1995–1996	Olimpia-Lechia Gdańsk	31	(0)
1996–1999	Polonia Warsaw	72	(0)
1999–2001	Śląsk Wrocław		
2001–2004	GKS Katowice	62	(0)
2004	RKS Radomsko	13	(0)
2005	Radomiak Radom	27	(0)
2006–2007	GKS Katowice		
2007–2009	Spójnia Osiek-Zimnodół		
2009–2014	Fortuna Gliwice		
2014–2015	MKS Sławków		
- * Club domestic league appearances and goals

Krzysztof Sadzawicki (born 20 February 1970) is a Polish former professional footballer who played as a defender. His son Dominik is also a footballer.
