= Zoch (surname) =

Zoch is a German surname. Notable people with the surname include:

- Georg Zoch (1902–1944), German screenwriter and film director
- Hieronim Zoch (born 1990), Polish footballer
- Jackie Zoch (born 1949), American rower
- Matheo Zoch (born 1996), Bolivian footballer
