= Piotr Rzepka =

Polish footballer

Personal information
- Date of birth: 13 September 1961 (age 65)
- Place of birth: Koszalin, Poland
- Height: 1.77 m (5 ft 10 in)
- Position: Midfielder

Senior career*
| Years | Team | Apps | (Gls) |
| 1976–1980 | Gwardia Koszalin | | |
| 1980–1988 | Bałtyk Gdynia | 212 | (29) |
| 1988–1989 | Górnik Zabrze | 42 | (7) |
| 1989–1992 | Bastia | | |
| 1992–1993 | Guingamp | 22 | (0) |
| 1993–1994 | FC Annonay | | |
| 1994–1996 | Ajaccio | | |
| 1996–1998 | Arka Gdynia | | |
| 1998–1999 | Pogoń Lębork | | |
| 1999 | Orlęta Reda | | |
| 1999–2003 | Wisła Tczew | | |
| 2004 | Unia Tczew | | |

International career
- Poland U18
| 1981–1989 | Poland | 7 | (1) |

Managerial career
- 2003: Wisła Tczew
- 2003: Kaszuby Połchowo
- 2003–2004: Unia Tczew
- 2004–2006: Elana Toruń
- 2006–2008: GKS Jastrzębie
- 2008–2009: Odra Opole
- 2009–2010: Bałtyk Gdynia
- 2011–2013: Górnik Łęczna
- 2014: Arka Gdynia
- 2014–2015: Kotwica Kołobrzeg
- 2015–2016: Gryf Wejherowo
- 2016–2017: Olimpia Zambrów
- 2017: Concordia Elbląg
- 2017–2018: Gryf Wejherowo
- 2019: Bałtyk Gdynia
- 2021–2023: Mławianka Mława
- 2023–2024: Mazovia Mińsk Mazowiecki
Medal record
Men's football
Representing Poland
UEFA European Under-18 Championship
| Runner-up | 1980 East Germany |
- * Club domestic league appearances and goals

Piotr Adam Rzepka (born 13 September 1961) is a Polish professional football manager and former player who played as a midfielder. Besides Poland, he played in France. He was most recently in charge of IV liga Masovia club Mazovia Mińsk Mazowiecki.

== Honours ==
Poland U18

- UEFA European Under-18 Championship runner-up: 1980
