= Kamil Kowalczyk =

Polish association football player

Personal information
- Full name: Kamil Kowalczyk
- Date of birth: 11 February 1976 (age 50)
- Place of birth: Poland
- Height: 1.83 m (6 ft 0 in)
- Position: Midfielder

Senior career*
Years	Team	Apps	(Gls)
1994–1995	Olimpia Poznań	12	(0)
1995–1996	Olimpia-Lechia Gdańsk	9	(0)
1995–1996	Lechia Gdańsk	7	(1)
2012–2014	SV Polonia München	15	(8)
- * Club domestic league appearances and goals

Kamil Kowalczyk (born 11 February 1976) is a Polish former professional footballer who played as a midfielder.

== Biography ==
It is known that Kowalczyk started his career with Olimpia Poznań, playing with the team in the I liga during the 1994–95 season. He made 12 appearances for in total for Polonia in the top division. The following season Polonia Poznań and Lechia Gdańsk were involved in a merger, creating the Olimpia-Lechia Gdańsk team. For the 1995–96 season Kowalczyk made appearances for both the Olimpia-Lechia team, which played in the I liga, and the Lechia Gdańsk II team, which was essentially the continuation of the Lechia team before the merger, and which played in the III liga. He made his Olimpia-Lechia debut on 4 October 1995 in a 3–0 defeat to Zagłębie Lubin, going on to make 9 appearances for Polonia-Lechia that season During this season he also made 5 appearances and scored 2 goals for the Lechia II team in the III liga. After the season, the Olimpia-Lechia team was disbanded after suffering relegation, with the Lechia II team, now officially going by the name Lechia Gdańsk again, took its place in the II liga. Kowalczyk made 2 appearances for Lechia at the start of the season before leaving the club. After making 21 appearances in Poland's top division, there is very little information about what happened to Kowalczyk after his time with Lechia, suggesting he may have left football altogether to follow a different career.

In 2012, it was announced that Kowalczyk had joined the German amateur team, SV Polonia München, which played in the 9th tier. The team was set up as a football club for Polish people living in Munich, Germany. Kowalczyk is known to have made 15 appearances, scoring 8 goals, for the amateur club.
