= Grzegorz Pawłuszek =

Polish footballer

Personal information
- Date of birth: 25 August 1970 (age 56)
- Place of birth: Złotów, Koszalin Voivodeship, Polish People's Republic
- Height: 1.89 m (6 ft 2 in)
- Position: Forward

Senior career*
Years	Team	Apps	(Gls)
1987–1990	Wisła Tczew		
1990–1992	Lechia Gdańsk		
1993–1994	Zawisza Bydgoszcz		
1995	GKS Katowice	24	(7)
1996	Górnik Konin		
1996	Polonia Warsaw	8	(0)
1997	Stomil Olsztyn	9	(2)
1998	Wisła Tczew		
1999	FC 08 Homburg		
1999–2002	Stahl Eisenhüttenstadt		
2003	Wisła Tczew		
2003–2004	Unia Tczew		
2004–2005	Cartusia Kartuzy		
2006–2012	Wierzyca Pelplin		

Managerial career
- 2017–2018: Wierzyca Pelplin
- * Club domestic league appearances and goals

Grzegorz Pawłuszek (born 25 August 1970) is a Polish former professional footballer who played as a forward.

== Honours ==
GKS Katowice

- Polish Super Cup: 1995
