= Tomasz Unton =

Polish footballer and manager

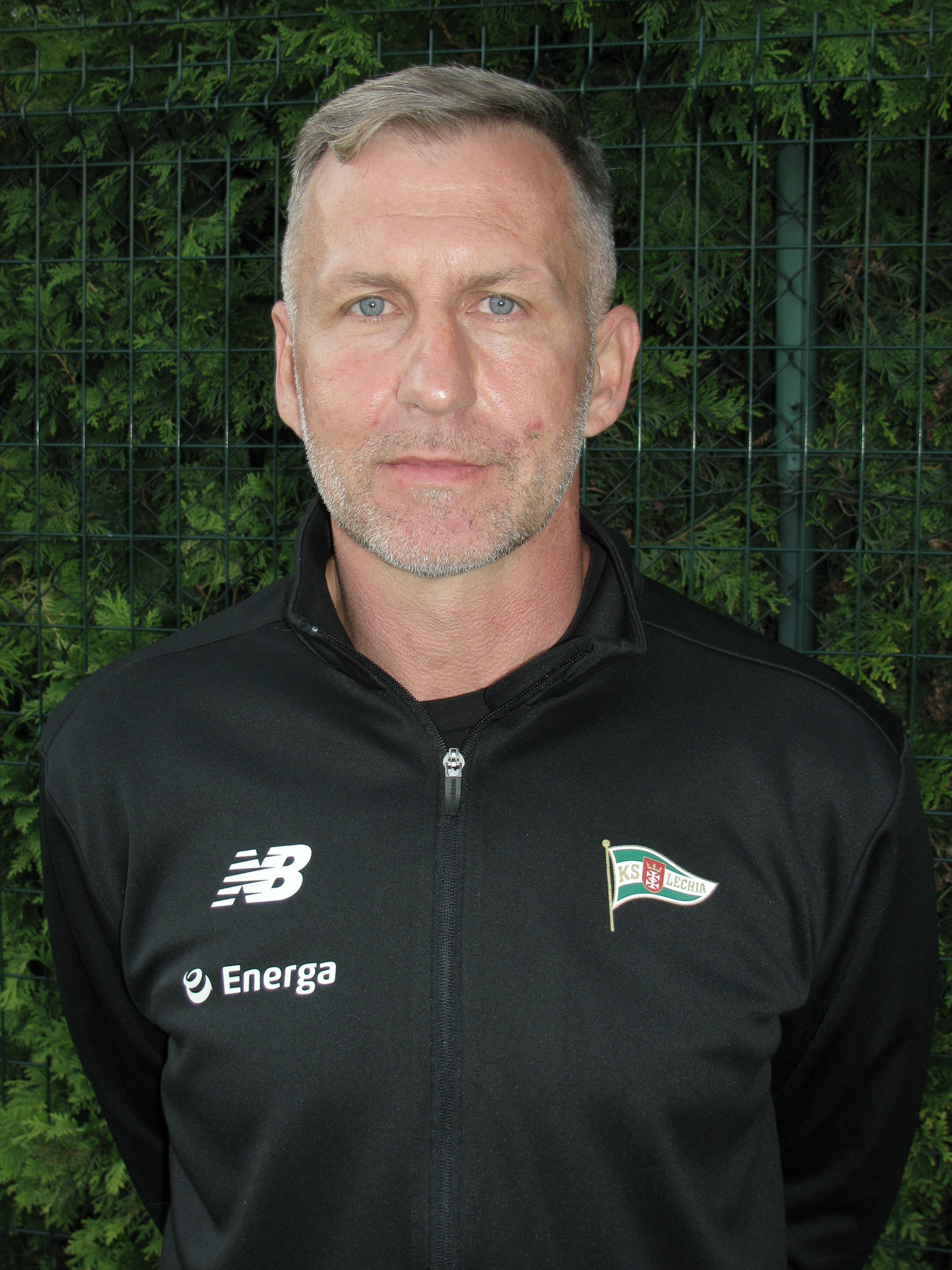

Personal information
- Full name: Tomasz Unton
- Date of birth: 1 November 1970 (age 55)
- Place of birth: Szczecin, Poland
- Height: 1.78 m (5 ft 10 in)
- Position: Midfielder

Youth career
- 1986–1987: Arka Gdynia

Senior career*
Years	Team	Apps	(Gls)
1988–1994	Lechia Gdańsk	212	(36)
1994–1995	Legia Warsaw	12	(1)
1995–1996	Olimpia-Lechia Gdańsk	21	(5)
1996	Polonia Warsaw	12	(1)
1997	Śląsk Wrocław	7	(0)
1997	Wierzyca Starogard Gdański		
1998	Stilon Gorzów Wielkopolski		
1998–2000	Eisenhüttenstädter FC Stahl		
2001	Arka Gdynia		
2004–2005	Kaszuby Połchowo		
2005–2007	GKS Luzino		
2008	Zatoka Puck		

Managerial career
- 2007: Gryf Wejherowo
- 2008: Orlęta Reda
- 2009: Unia Tczew
- 2011–2013: Lechia Gdańsk II
- 2014: Lechia Gdańsk (caretaker)
- 2015: Lechia Gdańsk II
- 2017–2018: Lechia Gdańsk (youth)
- 2021: AS Pomorze Gdańsk
- * Club domestic league appearances and goals

Tomasz Unton (born 1 November 1970) is a Polish former professional footballer who played as a midfielder. Unton spent the majority of his career playing in Pomerania, with his longest spell at Lechia Gdańsk.

== Senior career ==
Unton began his career at the youth levels with Arka Gdynia before joining Arka's rivals Lechia Gdańsk in 1988. During his 8 seasons at Lechia, Unton played 212 times in the league, and scored 36 goals placing him in the top 20 for all time appearances and goals scored while playing for Lechia. Despite an enjoyable time with Lechia, Unton's most successful period was his time with Legia Warsaw. Despite only playing 14 games in all competitions, Unton won the Ekstraklasa and the Puchar Polski before leaving the club months after he joined.

After Legia, Unton rejoined Lechia, now called Olimpia-Lechia Gdańsk due to a merger from Lechia Gdańsk and Olimpia Poznań. After the season Olimpia-Lechia were relegated, and Unton joined Polonia Warsaw. This started a period of Unton rarely staying at a club for more than one season. After Polonia, Unton played for Śląsk Wrocław, before playing for lower league Pomoranian sides Wierzyca Starogard Gdański and Stilon Gorzów Wielkopolski. Unton had a brief spell in Germany from 1998 to 2000 with Eisenhüttenstädter FC Stahl, before re-joining Arka Gdynia who he played for as a youth. With Arka, Unton won promotion from the third tier, after winning the league. Unton played for 3 more teams after Arka, all smaller Pomeranian teams, Kaszuby Połchowo from Połchowo, GKS Luzino from Luzino, and Zatoka Puck from Puck.

== Managerial career ==
In 2007, Unton started his managerial career with Gryf Wejherowo. In 2014, he was named caretaker manager of Lechia Gdańsk, a position he held from 21 September to 17 November.

== Personal life ==
Unton was born in Szczecin, where his father played football for Arkonia Szczecin, and his mother played handball for Pogoń Szczecin.

== Honours ==
Legia Warsaw

- Ekstraklasa: 1994–95
- Polish Cup: 1994–95
