= Piotr Wojdyga =

Polish footballer

Personal information
- Full name: Piotr Wojdyga
- Date of birth: 12 September 1962 (age 64)
- Place of birth: Warsaw, Poland
- Height: 1.88 m (6 ft 2 in)
- Position: Goalkeeper

Senior career*
Years	Team	Apps	(Gls)
1982–1983	Okęcie Warsaw		
1983–1985	Bałtyk Gdynia	3	(0)
1985–1991	Stal Mielec	134+	(0)
1991–1993	Widzew Łódź	76	(0)
1994	Pelikan Łowicz		
1994–1995	Olimpia Poznań	26	(0)
1995–1996	Olimpia-Lechia Gdańsk	22	(0)
1996–1999	Polonia Warsaw	66	(0)

Managerial career
- 2001–2002: Ceramika Opoczno
- 2002–2003: Tłoki Gorzyce
- * Club domestic league appearances and goals

Piotr Wojdyga (born 12 September 1962) is a Polish former professional footballer who played as a goalkeeper. He was most recently the goalkeeping coach of Legionovia Legionowo.

== Biography ==
=== Playing career ===
Born in Warsaw, Wojdyga started his career with Okęcie Warsaw, based in Western Warsaw. He played for the first team in the 1982–83 season. After one season with Okęcie, Wojdyga joined I liga team Bałtyk Gdynia. In his first season with the club he was the third choice goalkeeper, failing to make an appearance for the first team. In his second season with Bałtyk, Wojdyga made his top-tier debut, and made three league appearances during that campaign.

Wojdyga's career really took off when he joined Stal Mielec in 1985. He spent six seasons with Stal, five of those coming in Poland's top division, and making a total of 134 I liga appearances for the club. Wojdyga became Stal's first choice goalkeeper during this time, and while it is not known how many games he played in the II liga after Stal were relegated at the end of the 1986–87 season, it is known that Stal won the league and made an immediate return to the top division.

In 1991, Wojdyga joined the newly promoted Widzew Łódź, playing 34 games as Widzew went on to finish in an impressive 3rd place. The next two seasons were not as successful for Widzew or Wojdyga, but he went on to play 76 games for Widzew in the league. In January 1994 he joined Pelikan Łowicz, with whom he played for six months before joining Olimpia Poznań. He played 26 games for Olimpia before the team were involved in a merger with Lechia Gdańsk, creating the short lived Olimpia-Lechia Gdańsk team. The Olimpia-Lechia lasted only one season before it was dissolved, with Wojdyga becoming the team's main choice goalkeeper, making 22 appearances in the league that season. After the team were dissolved, Wojdyga found himself a free agent, moving to join Polonia Warsaw instead of the Lechia Gdańsk team taking the place of Olimpia-Lechia. In his final three seasons as a professional, he made 66 appearances for Polonia, spending his final season at the club as a reserve and not making any appearances that season, deciding to retire from professional football. In total during his career he made 327 appearances in Poland's top division.

=== Coaching career ===
After his playing career Wojdyga tried his hand with managerial positions, managing lower league clubs Ceramika Opoczno and Tłoki Gorzyce. At one point he was linked with the managerial job for Arka Gdynia, deciding instead to become the goalkeeping coach of Polonia Warsaw instead. After becoming a goalkeeping coach he has held this role at Korona Kielce, Górnik Zabrze, Odra Wodzisław, and again with Polonia Warsaw. From 2018 to 2024, he was part of Legionovia Legionowo's coaching staff.

== Honours ==
Stal Mielec

- II liga: 1987–88
