= Sebastian Nowak =

Sebastian Nowak may refer to:

- Sebastian Nowak (footballer, born 1982), Polish football goalkeeper
- Sebastian Nowak (footballer, born 1975), Polish football defender
