= Jarosław Gierejkiewicz =

Polish footballer

Personal information
- Date of birth: 3 September 1965 (age 61)
- Place of birth: Białystok, Poland
- Height: 1.82 m (6 ft 0 in)
- Position: Defensive midfielder

Senior career*
Years	Team	Apps	(Gls)
–1986	Jagiellonia Białystok		
1986–1988	Zagłębie Lubin	51	(0)
1988–1990	Jagiellonia Białystok	34	(1)
1990–1992	Miedź Legnica		
1993–1995	Olimpia Poznań		
1995–1996	Jagiellonia Białystok		
1997	KP Wasilków		
1997–1998	Wigry Suwałki		
1998	Toronto Croatia		
1998–1999	KP WP Podlaski		
1999–2000	Jagiellonia Białystok		
2000	Sparta Szepietowo		
2001	Warmia Grajewo		
2001–2002	Supraślanka Supraśl		
2002	Znicz Radziłów		
2003	Mazur Ełk		
2003	Znicz Radziłów		
2004–2006	Galaxy Jasło Chicago		

International career
1992	Poland	1	(0)
- * Club domestic league appearances and goals

Jarosław Gierejkiewicz (born 3 September 1965) is a Polish former professional footballer who played as a defensive midfielder.

He played in one match for the Poland national team in 1992.

== Honours ==
Miedź Legnica

- Polish Cup: 1991–92
