= Rafał Ruta =

Polish footballer (born 1972)

Personal information
- Full name: Rafał Ruta
- Date of birth: 24 October 1972 (age 54)
- Place of birth: Wieluń, Poland
- Height: 1.76 m (5 ft 9 in)
- Position: Midfielder

Senior career*
Years	Team	Apps	(Gls)
1988	Motor Praszka		
1989–1995	Stal Mielec	177	(8)
1996	Olimpia-Lechia Gdańsk	14	(1)
1996–1999	Polonia Warsaw	35	(0)
1999–2000	Ceramika Opoczno	35	(3)
2000–2001	Odra Wodzisław	27	(1)
2001–2002	Polonia Warsaw	2	(0)
2002–2003	Świt Nowy Dwór Mazowiecki	28	(5)
2004–2007	Polonia Mielec Chicago SC		
Total		318	(18)
- * Club domestic league appearances and goals

Rafał Ruta (born 24 October 1972) is a Polish footballer who played as a midfielder.

== Biography ==
Born on 24 October 1974, in Wieluń, Ruta started his career playing with local IV liga side Motor Praszka. After six months into his professional career, Ruta secured himself a move to I liga side Stal Mielec. Despite failing to make an appearance in his first six months at the club, he soon became an important player for Stal over the next few years. He made his Stal and I liga debut on 26 August 1989, playing in a 1–0 win against ŁKS Łódź. For a total of 7 seasons, Ruta was a consistent starter for Stal, playing in 177 I liga games and scoring 8 goals during this time.

In January 1996, Ruta joined fellow I liga team Olimpia-Lechia Gdańsk, making his debut against Stomil Olsztyn on 24 March 1996. Ruta made a total of 15 appearances and scored once during the six months he was a player for Olimpia-Lechia, with the team struggling during this time and eventually suffering relegation at the end of the season. After Olimpia-Lechia's relegation led to the club being dissolved, Ruta joined 10 other former Olimpia-Lechia players in joining Polonia Warsaw for the upcoming season. In his first season with Polonia, he made 20 appearances in the I liga, before his influence on the first team decreased, making a further 15 appearances combined over the following 2 seasons.

After his three seasons in the Polish capital, Ruta joined II liga side Ceramika Opoczno for the 1999–2000 season. He made 35 appearances and scored three goals for Ceramika during his one season with the club. Ruta returned to the I liga with Odra Wodzisław for the following season, playing 27 times and scoring a single goal with Odra. Ruta then returned to Polonia Warsaw but managed to only make 2 appearances during the season, eventually finding himself playing for the Polonia II team for the second half of the season. After his disappointing return to Polonia, Ruta joined Świt Nowy Dwór Mazowiecki. He had an impressive season with Świt, playing 28 times and scoring five goals for the club. At the end of the season, Świt was involved in a promotion play-off with Szczakowianka Jaworzno. Świt won 1–0, but the result was investigated for match fixing, with the final outcome including the lifetime bans of footballing activities in Poland for six players, one of them being Ruta. Due to the lifetime ban in his home country, Ruta moved to the United States, playing for Polonia Mielec Chicago SC over the following four seasons before finally retiring from playing.
