= Damian Nawrocik =

Polish footballer

Personal information
- Full name: Damian Nawrocik
- Date of birth: 3 July 1980 (age 46)
- Place of birth: Poznań, Poland
- Height: 1.77 m (5 ft 9 1/2 in)
- Position: Striker

Senior career*
Years	Team	Apps	(Gls)
2000–2006	Lech Poznań	47	(9)
2000	→ Luboński KS (loan)		
2001	→ Warta Poznań (loan)		
2006–2009	Arka Gdynia	63	(6)
2009–2010	ŁKS Łódź	19	(4)
2010–2011	KSZO Ostrowiec	20	(1)
2011	Jarota Jarocin	9	(2)
2012	Orkan Rumia	5	(0)
2014–2015	AFC Blackpool		
2016	Polonia Środa Wielkopolska	8	(1)
2017	Olimpia Poznań	10	(6)
2018	LZS Wronczyn	5	(1)
2023–2024	Polonia Poznań (oldboys)	22	(18)
- * Club domestic league appearances and goals as of 13:26, 25 June 2025 (UTC)

Damian Nawrocik (born 3 July 1980) is a Polish former professional footballer who played as a striker.

== Club career ==
On 9 February 2006, he moved to Arka Gdynia from Lech Poznań. In August 2009, he moved to ŁKS Łódź. In the summer of 2010, he joined KSZO Ostrowiec on a one-year deal.

== Honours ==
Lech Poznań

- Polish Cup: 2003–04

Olimpia Poznań

- Klasa B Poznań I: 2016–17
