= Jarosław Mazurkiewicz =

Polish footballer

Personal information
- Date of birth: 13 November 1979 (age 46)
- Place of birth: Tczew, Poland
- Height: 1.83 m (6 ft 0 in)
- Position: Midfielder

Youth career
- –1996: Wisła Tczew

Senior career*
Years	Team	Apps	(Gls)
1996–1998	Zawisza Bydgoszcz		
1998–2005	Polonia Warsaw	94	(5)
2000–2001	→ Ceramika Opoczno (loan)		
2005–2006	La Louvière	27	(1)
2006	Start Otwock		
2007	Asteras Tripolis	1	(0)
2007–2008	Péruwelz		
2008–2009	Zakynthos		
2009–2011	Start Otwock	63	(6)
2011–2012	Høland IL		
- * Club domestic league appearances and goals

Jarosław Mazurkiewicz (born 13 November 1979) is a Polish former professional footballer who played as a midfielder.

== Honours ==
Polonia Warsaw

- Ekstraklasa: 1999–2000
- Polish League Cup: 1999–2000
