= Dariusz Gładyś =

Polish association football player

Personal information
- Full name: Dariusz Gładyś
- Date of birth: 27 April 1969 (age 57)
- Place of birth: Zielina, Poland
- Height: 1.83 m (6 ft 0 in)
- Position: Goalkeeper

Youth career
- –1988: Odra Wodzisław

Senior career*
Years	Team	Apps	(Gls)
1988–1990	Odra Wodzisław	4	(0)
1990–1992	Błękitni Kielce	34	(0)
1992–1996	Lechia Gdańsk	82	(0)
1995–1996	Olimpia-Lechia Gdańsk	12	(0)
1997	Arka Gdynia		
1997–1998	Pomezania Malbork		
1998–2001	Gedania Gdańsk		
- * Club domestic league appearances and goals

Dariusz Gładyś (born 27 April 1969) is a Polish former professional footballer who played as a goalkeeper.

== Biography ==
=== Playing career ===
Born in Zielina, Poland, he was first introduced to football by his father, who played professionally for clubs in the South-West of Poland. His father took him to training sessions from an early age, eventually training with the youth sides of Odra Wodzisław. Gładyś graduated from mining school, qualifying to be a machine mechanic, stating that if he never became a footballer he would have used his training to work in the mines.

In 1988 Gładyś joined the Odra Wodzisław first team, spending two seasons with the first team making 4 appearances in the league, before joining Błękitni Kielce due to his mandatory military service. During his first year with Błękitni Kielce the team were promoted from the III liga. It is not known how many appearances Gładyś made in his first season with Błękitni, but it is known that he made 34 appearances the following season in the II liga as the team finished in 6th place, well clear of any relegation threats.

After his mandatory military service Gładyś moved to Gdańsk, joining II liga side Lechia Gdańsk. He made his Lechia debut playing against Chemik Police on 8 August 1992. Gładyś went on to have his single longest spell at a club, playing for Lechia over the next four and a half seasons. For the 1995–96 season Lechia were involved in a merger with Olimpia Poznań, creating the Olimpia-Lechia Gdańsk team. Gładyś made 12 appearances for Olimpia-Lechia in the I liga while also making 12 appearances for the Lechia Gdańsk II team in the III liga. After this season the Olimpia-Lechia team were disbanded and the Lechia Gdańsk II team took its place in the league, simply being called Lechia Gdańsk again. He spent a further 6 months at Lechia, making a total of 99 appearances in all competitions for both Lechia teams.

He joined Lechia's rivals Arka Gdynia for 6 months, and joined Pomezania Malbork for the following season. Gładyś spent the final 3 seasons of his career playing for lower league side Gedania Gdańsk, retiring from professional football in 2001.

=== Coaching career ===
Gładyś has been a coach at Lechia over two different spells. Between 2005 and 2007 his role was as an assistant coach, while he was the goalkeeping coach for Lechia from 2009 to 2013. Gładyś also held the role of goalkeeping coach with Bytovia Bytów between 2014 and 2016.
