= Joseph Aziz =

Ghanaian footballer

Personal information
- Full name: Joseph Annor Aziz
- Date of birth: 7 January 1974 (age 52)
- Place of birth: Accra, Ghana
- Height: 1.75 m (5 ft 9 in)
- Position: Forward

Senior career*
Years	Team	Apps	(Gls)
- Ashanti Goldfields
–1995	Hearts of Oak		
1995	Polonia Warsaw		
1995	Legia Warsaw	3	(0)
1996–1997	Olimpia-Lechia Gdańsk	2	(0)
1997–1998	Polonia Warsaw		
1998–1999	Sporting Cristal		
1999–2000	Stuttgarter Kickers	15	(2)
2000–2004	FC Augsburg	16	(2)
2004–2005	SV Eintracht Trier 05	62	(18)
2005–2006	SV Babberich		
- SC Oranje Arnhem

International career
	Ghana	12	(7)
- * Club domestic league appearances and goals

Joseph Annor Aziz (born 7 January 1974 in Accra) is a Ghanaian retired professional footballer who played as a forward for several clubs in Latin America and Europe and the Ghana national team.

== Career ==
In 1995, Aziz moved to Poland to play for Legia Warsaw. In October 1995 Aziz joined Olimpia-Lechia Gdańsk, the short lived team created by the merger of Lechia Gdańsk and Olimpia Poznań, before leaving the club in December. During his 3-month spell at Lechia he made two appearances. He played for Polonia Warsaw from 1996 to 1997, making 17 Ekstraklasa appearances and scoring once, before moving to Sporting Cristal of Peru. He spent the following seasons in Germany, enjoying success with SV Eintracht Trier 05.

== International ==
Aziz made twelve appearances for the Ghana national football team, scoring seven goals.
