= Emmanuel Tetteh =

Ghanaian footballer

Personal information
- Full name: Emmanuel Tetteh
- Date of birth: 25 December 1974 (age 51)
- Place of birth: Accra, Ghana
- Height: 1.70 m (5 ft 7 in)
- Position: Forward

Senior career*
Years	Team	Apps	(Gls)
–1990	Hearts of Oak		
1990–1994	Sint-Truidense		
1994–1995	Winterthur		
1995–1996	Lechia Gdańsk	30	(9)
1996	Polonia Warsaw	18	(4)
1997–1999	IFK Göteborg	49	(15)
1999	Vanspor	1	(0)
1999–2000	Trabzonspor	3	(0)
2000	Bursaspor	11	(3)
2000–2003	Çaykur Rizespor	99	(30)
2005	Hearts of Oak		

International career
1994–1999	Ghana		
- * Club domestic league appearances and goals

Emmanuel Tetteh (born 25 December 1974) is a Ghanaian former professional footballer who played as a forward.

== Career ==
Tetteh began his career with Hearts of Oak in Ghana. He moved to Europe to play for Sint-Truidense and Winterthur, before moving to Lechia Gdańsk and Polonia Warsaw. He had a spell in Sweden with IFK Göteborg and played for Vanspor, Trabzonspor, Bursaspor, and Çaykur Rizespor in the Turkish Super Lig.

Tetteh made his debut for the Ghana national team in a friendly against South Africa on 1994. He is the brother of Joseph Annor Aziz
