= Sebastian Nowak (footballer, born 1975) =

Polish association football player

Personal information
- Full name: Sebastian Nowak
- Date of birth: 16 May 1975 (age 51)
- Place of birth: Poznań, Poland
- Height: 1.88 m (6 ft 2 in)
- Position: Defender

Youth career
- –1993: Polonia Leszno

Senior career*
| Years | Team | Apps | (Gls) |
| 1994–1995 | Polonia Leszno | | |
| 1995 | Olimpia Poznań | 6 | (0) |
| 1995 | Olimpia-Lechia Gdańsk | 7 | (1) |
| 1995–1996 | Polonia Warsaw | 2 | (0) |
| 1996 | Olimpia-Lechia Gdańsk | 6 | (1) |
| 1996 | Lechia Gdańsk | 6 | (0) |
| 1996–1998 | Stomil Olsztyn | 51 | (3) |
| 1998–2002 | Legia Warsaw | 20 | (0) |
| 2001 | → Odra Opole (loan) | 1 | (0) |
| 2003 | Aluminium Konin | 29 | (1) |
| 2004 | RKS Radomsko | | |
| 2004 | Kania Gostyń | | |
- * Club domestic league appearances and goals

Sebastian Nowak (born 16 May 1975) is a Polish former professional footballer who played as a defender. His playing career lasted just over 10 years, during which time he made 90 appearances and scored 5 goals in the I liga, while also retiring with two honours to his name.

== Biography ==
Nowak started his career playing for the youth side of Polonia Leszno, eventually being promoted to the first team in January 1994. After a year with Polonia, he joined Ekstraklasa team Olimpia Poznań, making six appearances in his first season in Poland's top division. For the 1995–96 season, Olimpia were involved in a merger with Lechia Gdańsk, creating the Olimpia-Lechia Gdańsk team. Olimpia-Lechia Gdańsk took Olimpia Poznań's place in the league, while the Lechia Gdańsk team from the previous season was renamed as Lechia Gdańsk II and operated as the club's official second team, playing in the III liga after the previous seasons relegation. Nowak made his Olimpia-Lechia debut against Śląsk Wrocław on 29 July 1995. He went on to make seven appearances for Olimpia-Lechia before being involved in a transfer in November to join second-tier team Polonia Warsaw. His time at Polonia did not last long, and after making only two league appearances he returned to Olimpia-Lechia in February 1996. Upon his return to the team, he went on to make a further six appearances in Ekstraklasa, while also playing in the III liga with Lechia's reserves, also making six appearances. At the end of the season Olimpia-Lechia were relegated, and the team was dissolved. The Lechia Gdańsk team that ran as the club's second team took the place of the Olimpia-Lechia team in the league, and operated as an independent first team again.

Nowak did not stay at the club to see the process of transitioning between clubs once again, deciding instead to stay in the top division with Stomil Olsztyn. It was with Stomil that Nowak enjoyed his greatest individual success as a footballer. Over the next two seasons he consistently played for Stomil in the top division, and making 51 league appearances with the club, the only time in his career he would make 50 appearances for one club. While his time with Stomil was the greatest in terms of individual success, it was his next move that brought about his greatest achievements with a team.

In 1998 Nowak joined Legia Warsaw, making his debut on 31 July 1998 against his previous club, Stomil. In his first season with Legia he made 13 appearances, the most he would make in one season for the club. The following season Nowak only made two league appearances, and found himself playing with the Legia II team the season after that. During the season after he was dropped from the first team, Nowak was loaned to Odra Opole, however he only managed to make one appearance for the team. Over the summer, Nowak managed to get himself in the first team's plans again, and made four league appearances as Legia went on to win the title. That same season, Nowak played six times in the Polish League Cup, with Legia winning the League Cup after a two-legged final against Wisła Kraków. At the start of the following season, Nowak only made two more appearances for the club, and was transferred to Aluminium Konin over the winter break. During the four years with Legia, Nowak only managed to make 32 appearances in all competitions. Nowak spent 12 months with Aluminium Konin, playing 29 times in the league, and scoring one goal. In the final 12 months of his playing career, he spent time with RKS Radomsko and Kania Gostyń, retiring from playing at the end of 2004.

== Honours ==
Legia Warsaw

- Ekstraklasa: 2001–02
- Polish League Cup: 2001–02
