= Piotr Burlikowski =

Polish footballer and executive (born 1970)

Personal information
- Date of birth: 14 September 1970 (age 56)
- Place of birth: Bydgoszcz, Poland
- Height: 1.80 m (5 ft 11 in)
- Position: Forward

Team information
- Current team: Wisła Płock (sporting director)

Senior career*
Years	Team	Apps	(Gls)
1987–1990	Chemik Bydgoszcz		
1990	Polonia Bydgoszcz		
1991–1993	Chemik Bydgoszcz	39	(11)
1993–1995	Olimpia Poznań	58	(16)
1995	Olimpia-Lechia Gdańsk	4	(0)
1995	Sokół Pniewy/Tychy	9	(2)
1996	VfL Herzlake	10	(0)
1996	Polonia Warsaw	15	(1)
1997–1998	Zawisza Bydgoszcz	48	(16)
1998–1999	Pogoń Szczecin	20	(0)
1999–2000	FC Aurillac		
2000	Zawisza Bydgoszcz		
2001	RoPS	2	(0)
2001	Jersey Falcons		
2001–2002	Arka Gdynia	10	(1)
2002–2003	Polonia Bydgoszcz		
2003–2004	Zawisza Bydgoszcz		
- * Club domestic league appearances and goals

Piotr Burlikowski (born 14 September 1970) is a Polish football executive and former professional footballer who played as a forward. He played in the top divisions of Poland and Finland, as well as playing abroad in Germany, France and the United States. He is currently the sporting director of Ekstraklasa club Wisła Płock.

== Club career ==
=== Early years ===
Born in Bydgoszcz, Burlikowski started playing football for his local club Chemik Bydgoszcz, breaking into the first team in 1987. He spent three seasons with Chemik before making a move to join city rivals Polonia Bydgoszcz. After only a six-month spell with Polonia he returned to Chemik, who at this time were playing in the II liga, with Burlikowski being a part of the team that made its highest ever finish in the Polish leagues, 5th in the II liga. During his second spell with Chemik, Burlikowski made a total of 39 appearances and scored 11 goals in the league. In 1993 Chemik suffered relegation from the II liga, leading to Burlikowski leaving the club.

=== Top division football and short term moves ===
In 1993 Burlikowski joined Olimpia Poznań, who had been recently relegated from the I liga. During the 1993–94 season Olimpia performed well in the league finishing runners-up and securing an immediate return to Poland's top division. During this season Burlikowski played 24 times and scored 4 times in the league. Burlikowski made his I liga debut on 30 July 1994 in the 6–2 win against Raków Częstochowa. In total, he made 34 appearances and scored 12 goals as Olimpia secured their safety in the league. At the end of the season Olimpia were involved in a merger with Lechia Gdańsk, creating the Olimpia-Lechia Gdańsk team. Burlikowski originally stayed with the Olimpia-Lechia merger, but soon left the club to join fellow I liga side Sokół Pniewy/Tychy after playing in only 4 games. His time with Sokół was equally short, and after only a few months he had moved to Germany to play for the lower league team VfL Herzlake, returning to Poland after 6 months, joining I liga side Polonia Warsaw. After a series of short term moves, Burlikowski settled down for 18 months, returning to the city of his birth and playing for Zawisza Bydgoszcz. During these 18 months he made 48 appearances and scored 16 goals in the league. For the 1998–99 season Burlikowski joined Pogoń Szczecin, in what would be his final season playing in Poland's top division, making 20 appearances over the course of the season.

=== Later playing years ===
After his season with Pogoń, he joined French side FC Aurillac for a season, before a series of more short-term deals with clubs. Initially returning to Zawisza Bydgoszcz before playing in Finland with Rovaniemen Palloseura, and in the United States with Jersey Falcons. He returned to Poland in 2001, spending a season with Arka Gdynia, before spending seasons with Polonia Bydgoszcz and Zawisza Bydgoszcz, retiring from playing in 2004.

== Executive career ==
After retirement, Burlikowski became the sports director at Korona Kielce from 2005 until 2006, and later held a similar role as director of sports affairs at Arka Gdynia. In 2009, Burlikowski became the vice-president of Zawisza Bydgoszcz, holding this role until 2011 after changes on the management board. Burlikowski again held roles of sports director, firstly with Cracovia from 2013 to 2014, and with Zagłębie Lubin from 2014 to 2016.

In 2016, he became an advisor to Zbigniew Boniek, president of the Polish Football Association.

In 2021, he returned to the role of sporting director at Zagłębie. Following a poor start to the 2024–25 season, he was sacked by Zagłębie's board on 23 September 2024, along with manager Waldemar Fornalik.

On 11 September 2025, Burlikowski joined Zagłębie Sosnowiec as a board representative. He held the role until the end of the month, when he and Zagłębie mutually agreed to part ways after Burlikowski received an offer to join Widzew Łódź's management staff. On 3 October, his appointment as Widzew's sports department director was confirmed. Shortly after, alongside Widzew's board representative Dariusz Adamczuk, he oversaw the appointment of Igor Jovićević, the club's third full-time manager since the season started. Widzew made several signings during the winter transfer window, including Poland internationals Bartłomiej Drągowski and Przemysław Wiśniewski, Congolese international Steve Kapuadi from rival team Legia Warsaw, Osman Bukari, Christopher Cheng, Carlos Isaac, Emil Kornvig and Lukas Lerager, for a reported total of €16.8 million. The club's form continued to decline until the appointment of Aleksandar Vuković as manager in March 2026; Widzew went on to escape relegation in the final round of the season. On 24 June 2026, Burlikowski was sacked by Widzew.

On 2 November 2026, Burlikowski replaced Łukasz Stupka as Wisła Płock's sporting director on a deal until June 2028.
