= Wisła Tczew =

Association football club in Tczew

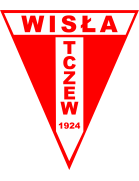
- Full name: Międzyzakładowy Klub Sportowy Wisła Tczew
- Nicknames: Duma Kociewia (transl. Pride of Kociewia)
- Founded: 1924
- Ground: Stadion im. Henryka Guzego
- Capacity: 1200
- Head coach: Leszek Różycki
- League: Klasa B, group Malbork
- 2022–23: Withdrawn from competition
- Website: Wisła Tczew on Facebook
Home colours	Away colours

Wisła Tczew is a Polish professional football and boxing club based in Tczew, Kociewie, Poland.

Founded in 1924, the club has traditionally worn a white and red strip for both home and away appearances. The club takes its name from the Polish word for the Vistula which runs through Tczew.

== History ==
The club was first established as the Wisła Bowling Club in 1924, while its football section was founded in 1927. In 1932, Wisła achieved its best success in the interwar history, coming 3rd place in Klasa B, which gave the club the opportunity to fight in the finals for promotion to Klasa A. Following the 2007/2008 season Wisła advanced from the liga okręgowa to the IV liga.

In June 2009, there was a record transfer in the club's history when Paweł Wszołek was sold to Polonia Warsaw. In the 2009/2010 season, following a merger with the second Tczew football club, Unia Tczew, a new club Gryf Tczew was created. In August 2009, senior Wisła juniors, already representing Gryf, under the care of Mikołaj Bykowski and Krzysztof Śliwa, were successful in winning 3rd place in the U-18 category in the prestigious Remes Cup tournament after winning the qualifying group against Polonia Warsaw, among others.

On May 22, 2015, the reactivation of the Wisła Tczew club was announced. In the 2015–2016 season, Wisła joined the Klasa B competition. In the 2015/2016 season the club was promoted to Klasa A. In the 2017/2018 season, Wisła advanced to the liga okręgowa.

In addition to the football section, the club also has a boxing section.

== Historical names ==
- 1924-1926 ─ Klub Kręglarski Wisła (Wisła Football Club)
- 1926-1948 ─ Klub Sportowy Wisła (Wisła Sports Club)
- 1948-1954 ─ Koło Sportowe Spójnia-Wisła przy Zrzeszeniu Spójnia PSS „Społem” (Sports Club of Spójnia-Wisła at the Spójnia Association at "Społem")
- 1954-1956 ─ Koło Sportowe przy Ludowych Zespołach Sportowych (Sports Circle at the People's Sports Teams)
- 1957-1959 ─ Ludowy Klub Sportowy Wisła przy Technicznej Obsłudze Rolnictwa w Tczewie (Wisła People's Sports Club at the Technical Service for Agriculture in Tczew)
- 1960-1964 ─ Związkowy Klub Sportowy Wisła przy Zakładach Sprzętu Motoryzacyjnego w Tczewie (Union Wisła Sports Club at the Automotive Equipment Works in Tczew)
- 1964-2015 ─ Międzyzakładowy Klub Sportowy Wisła (Inter-factory Wisła Sports Club)
- From 2015 ─ Stowarzyszenie Piłkarskie Wisła (Wisła Football Association)

== Successes ==
- 3. place in III Liga - 1932, 1985-1986
- Playoffs for promotion to II Liga - 1932, 1974-1975
- 1/32 Polish Cup final - 1987–1988, 1989-1990
- OZPN Polish Cup Gdańsk - 1988-1989

=== Current squad ===
As of 3 March 2020

Note: Flags indicate national team as defined under FIFA eligibility rules; some limited exceptions apply. Players may hold more than one non-FIFA nationality.

No.	Pos.	Nation	Player
-	MF	POL	Dawid Kolodziejczyk

== Personnel ==
=== Current technical staff ===
Position	Staff
Head coach	(Poland) Leszek Różycki

=== Management ===
Position	Staff
President	(Poland) Marcin Klein

=== Notable players ===
- Zbigniew Grzybowski
- Roman Józefowicz
- Marek Kowalczyk
- Lech Kulwicki
- Sebastian Małkowski
- Jarosław Mazurkiewicz
- Marcin Mięciel
- Grzegorz Pawłuszek
- Arkadiusz Rojek
- Piotr Rzepka
- Jerzy Sionek
- Andrzej Stretowicz
- Paweł Wszołek
- Hieronim Zoch
- Łukasz Janczyński

== Stadium ==
Wisła play their home matches at the Henryka Guze stadium located on Ceglarska street in Tczew. While the stadium is not floodlit, it has a capacity of 1200 (180 seats), and a pitch 96 × 67 m. The club previously used the City Stadium on Bałdowska street, which had a capacity of 2500 (including 150 seats).

== Supporters and rivalries ==
In common with much of the region of Kociewia supporters of Wisła Tczew owe their allegiances to the Tricity rivalry, maintaining friendly relations with fans of clubs which sympathise with Arka Gdynia such as Kaszubia Kościerzyna, and rivalries with clubs allied to Lechia Gdańsk in particular Unia Tczew.
