= Adam Grad =

Polish footballer (1969–2015)

Personal information
- Date of birth: 10 September 1969
- Place of birth: Łódź, Poland
- Date of death: 7 February 2015 (aged 45)
- Place of death: Łódź, Poland
- Height: 1.74 m (5 ft 8 1/2 in)
- Position: Striker

Youth career
- Energetyk Łódź

Senior career*
Years	Team	Apps	(Gls)
1988–1992	ŁKS Łódź	109	(13)
1992–1994	Olimpia Poznań		
1994–1995	Kayserispor	13	(4)
1995	Olimpia Poznań	6	(1)
1995–1996	Lechia Gdańsk	21	(2)
1996	Sokół Tychy	5	(0)
1996–1997	Aluminium Konin		
1998	Astra Krotoszyn		
1998	Pelikan Łowicz		
1999	Karkonosze Jelenia Góra		
2000	Unia Skierniewice		
2000	MKS Mława		
2001	ŁKS Łódź		
2001–2002	Jagiellonia Białystok		
2002–2003	Korona Kielce		
2004	Pogoń Staszów		
2004	Siarka Tarnobrzeg		
2005–2007	MKS 2000 Tuszyn		
- * Club domestic league appearances and goals

Adam Grad (10 September 1969 – 7 February 2015) was a Polish professional footballer who played as a striker for many clubs in Poland, playing in the Ekstraklasa for ŁKS Łódź, Olimpia Poznań and Lechia Gdańsk, and played in the Turkish Süper Lig for Kayserispor.
