= Andrzej Stretowicz =

Polish footballer

Personal information
- Date of birth: 23 February 1976 (age 50)
- Place of birth: Tczew, Poland
- Height: 1.85 m (6 ft 1 in)
- Position: Striker

Senior career*
Years	Team	Apps	(Gls)
- Wisła Tczew
1996–1997	Korona Kielce		
1997–1998	Lechia Gdańsk		
1998–1999	Stomil Olsztyn	3	(0)
1999	Pomezania Malbork		
2000	Wisła Tczew		
2000–2002	Okęcie Warsaw		
2002	Quang Nam		
2003–2005	Mazowsze Grójec		
2005–2006	Unia Skierniewice		
2006	Polonia New York		
2007	FS Vágar	18	(14)
2008	07 Vestur	?	(15)
2009–2011	Dolcan Ząbki	47	(6)
2011–2012	Høland IL		
- * Club domestic league appearances and goals

Andrzej Stretowicz (born 23 February 1976) is a Polish former professional footballer who played as a striker.
