= Hieronim Zoch =

Polish footballer

Personal information
- Date of birth: 30 September 1990 (age 36)
- Place of birth: Tczew, Poland
- Height: 1.83 m (6 ft 0 in)
- Position: Goalkeeper

Team information
- Current team: Siarka Tarnobrzeg
- Number: 23

Youth career
- Unia Tczew
- Wisła Tczew

Senior career*
| Years | Team | Apps | (Gls) |
| 2008–2011 | Arka Gdynia (ME) | 39 | (0) |
| 2011–2012 | Arka Gdynia | 1 | (0) |
| 2011–2012 | Arka Gdynia II | 5 | (0) |
| 2012–2014 | Concordia Elbląg | 46 | (0) |
| 2014 | Olimpia Elbląg | 14 | (0) |
| 2014–2019 | Wigry Suwałki | 69 | (0) |
| 2019–2020 | Siarka Tarnobrzeg | 29 | (0) |
| 2020–2022 | Wigry Suwałki | 68 | (0) |
| 2022–2023 | KP Starogard Gdański | 27 | (0) |
| 2023– | Siarka Tarnobrzeg | 17 | (0) |
- * Club domestic league appearances and goals as of 23:25, 3 June 2026 (UTC)

Hieronim Zoch (born 30 September 1990) is a Polish professional footballer who plays as a goalkeeper for III liga club Siarka Tarnobrzeg, where he also serves as the goalkeeping coach.

== Career ==
Zych made his Ekstraklasa debut against Korona Kielce on 14 May 2011.

On 4 August 2020, he returned to Wigry Suwałki.

== Honours ==
Siarka Tarnobrzeg

- Polish Cup (Stalowa Wola regionals): 2025–26
