= Igor Kozioł =

Polish footballer

Personal information
- Date of birth: 2 January 1976 (age 50)
- Place of birth: Wadowice, Poland
- Height: 1.87 m (6 ft 2 in)
- Positions: Midfielder; defender

Youth career
- 1990–1992: Skawa Wadowice

Senior career*
Years	Team	Apps	(Gls)
1993	Legia Warsaw	0	(0)
1994	Hutnik Warsaw		
1994	Legia Warsaw	1	(0)
1995	Polonia Warsaw		
1995–1996	Olimpia-Lechia Gdańsk	20	(0)
1996–1998	Legia Warsaw	21	(0)
1998–1999	Zagłębie Lubin	18	(0)
1999	Legia Warsaw	2	(0)
2000–2008	Dyskobolia Grodzisk	175	(2)
2008–2010	Polonia Warsaw	29	(1)
- * Club domestic league appearances and goals

Igor Kozioł (born 2 January 1976) is a Polish former professional footballer who played as a midfielder or defender.

== Honours ==
Legia Warsaw

- Polish Cup: 1996–97
- Polish Super Cup: 1994

Dyskobolia Grodzisk Wielkopolski

- Polish Cup: 2006–07
- Ekstraklasa Cup: 2006–07, 2007–08
