= Juliusz Kruszankin =

Polish footballer

Personal information
- Full name: Juliusz Stanisław Kruszankin
- Date of birth: 5 June 1965 (age 61)
- Place of birth: Łódź, Poland
- Height: 1.93 m (6 ft 4 in)
- Position: Defender

Senior career*
Years	Team	Apps	(Gls)
1984–1988	ŁKS Łódź	106	(2)
1988–1990	Legia Warsaw	38	(1)
1990–1992	ŁKS Łódź	62	(4)
1992–1994	Legia Warsaw	71	(7)
1994–1995	Hapoel Haifa	22	(0)
1995	GKS Bełchatów	15	(0)
1996	Lechia/Olimpia Gdańsk	4	(0)
1996	Polonia Warsaw		
1997	Hetman Zamość		
1997–1998	Olimpia Warsaw		
1999	Hutnik Warsaw		
2000	Włókniarz Pabianice		
2000	Stal Głowno		
2000–2001	Stal Stalowa Wola		
2001–2002	Stal Głowno		
2002	Astra Krotoszyn		
2003	Glinik/Karpatia Gorlice		

International career
1986–1993	Poland	7	(0)
- * Club domestic league appearances and goals

Juliusz Stanisław Kruszankin (born 5 June 1965) is a Polish former professional footballer who played as a defender. He played in seven matches for the Poland national football team from 1986 to 1993.

== Honours ==
Legia Warsaw

- Ekstraklasa: 1993–94, 1994–95
- Polish Cup: 1988–89, 1989–90, 1993–94
- Polish Super Cup: 1989, 1994
