= Karol Piątek =

Polish footballer

Personal information
- Full name: Karol Piątek
- Date of birth: 4 July 1982 (age 44)
- Place of birth: Luzino, Poland
- Height: 1.76 m (5 ft 9 1/2 in)
- Position: Midfielder

Youth career
- Błyskawica Luzino
- Gryf Wejherowo
- 1997–2000: Lechia Gdańsk

Senior career*
Years	Team	Apps	(Gls)
2000–2002	Lechia Gdańsk	21	(1)
2002	→ Arka Gdynia (loan)		
2002–2003	ŁKS Łódź	43	(0)
2003–2006	Cracovia	6	(0)
2006–2010	Lechia Gdańsk	87	(11)
2009–2010	Lechia Gdańsk II	2	(0)
2010–2014	Termalica Bruk-Bet	90	(1)
2014–2016	Bytovia Bytów	15	(1)
2015–2017	KTS-K Luzino		

International career
- Poland U18
Medal record
Men's football
Representing Poland
UEFA European Under-18 Championship
Winner	2001 Finland
- * Club domestic league appearances and goals

Karol Piątek (born 4 July 1982) is a Polish former professional footballer who played as a midfielder.

== Honours ==
Lechia Gdańsk

- II liga: 2007–08

KTS-K Luzino

- Regional league Gdańsk I: 2016–17

Poland U18

- UEFA European Under-18 Championship: 2001
