= Miedź Legnica =

Association football club

Coordinates: 51°12′12.9″N 16°10′11.6″E

- Full name: Miejski Klub Sportowy; Miedź Legnica SA
- Nickname: Miedzianka
- Founded: 14 September 1971; 55 years ago
- Ground: White Eagle Municipal Stadium
- Capacity: 6,244
- Chairman: Tomasz Brusiło
- Manager: Dawid Kroczek
- League: I liga
- 2025–26: I liga, 8th of 18
- Website: miedzlegnica.eu
Home colours	Away colours

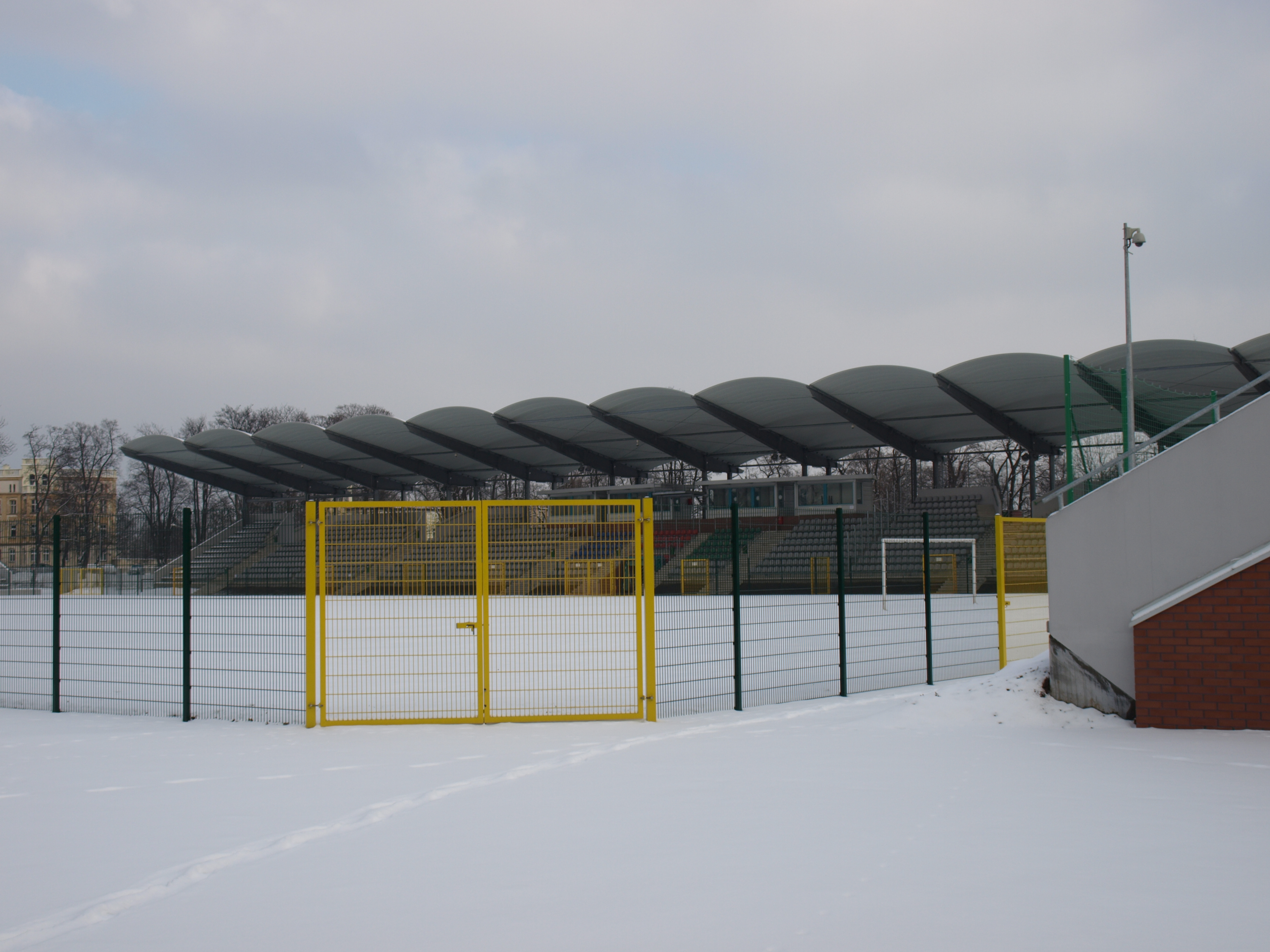
White Eagle Municipal Stadium

Miedź Legnica (Polish pronunciation: [ˈmjɛt͡ɕ lɛɡˈɲit͡sa]) is a professional football club based in Legnica, Poland, that competes in the I liga, following relegation in 2023. Miedź was founded in 1971.

In 2018, Miedź Legnica achieved promotion to the top flight for the first time in club's history. After a three-year absence from the top flight, they were promoted again at the end of the 2021–22 season after winning the league.

== Players ==
=== Current squad ===
As of 15 September 2026

Note: Flags indicate national team as defined under FIFA eligibility rules; some limited exceptions apply. Players may hold more than one non-FIFA nationality.

No.	Pos.	Nation	Player
1	GK	AUT	Ivan Lučić
3	DF	POL	Mateusz Grudziński (captain)
7	DF	POL	Mateusz Bochnak
8	MF	POL	Jakub Serafin
9	FW	CRO	Kristian Fućak
10	MF	POL	Juliusz Letniowski
11	DF	SWE	Gustaf Norlin
12	GK	UKR	Dmytro Sydorenko
17	DF	POL	Igor Maliszewski
18	MF	ESP	Asier Córdoba
20	DF	POL	Marcin Umnicki
21	FW	POL	Daniel Stanclik
23	MF	POL	Filip Żur
24	GK	POL	Hubert Siniecki
28	DF	SEN	Babacar Diallo

No.	Pos.	Nation	Player
29	DF	POL	Kacper Michałeczko
30	DF	SRB	Miloš Jovičić
33	GK	POL	Franciszek Chojak
44	MF	POL	Igor Korczakowski
49	DF	POL	Oliwier Szymoniak
52	DF	POL	Oliwier Olewiński
70	MF	POL	Wojciech Hajda
71	FW	POL	Sebastian Herbut
77	GK	POL	Krzysztof Narożny
78	DF	UKR	Myroslav Mazur
80	MF	BIH	Zvonimir Petrović
95	FW	GER	Marcel Mansfeld
98	MF	POL	Kamil Antonik
99	DF	POL	Karol Noiszewski

=== Other players under contract ===
Note: Flags indicate national team as defined under FIFA eligibility rules; some limited exceptions apply. Players may hold more than one non-FIFA nationality.

No.	Pos.	Nation	Player
5	DF	BIH	Adnan Kovačević
6	MF	POL	Jacek Podgórski

No.	Pos.	Nation	Player
—	FW	SEN	Mame Mody Sy (on loan from Dakar Sacré-Cœur)

=== Out on loan ===
Note: Flags indicate national team as defined under FIFA eligibility rules; some limited exceptions apply. Players may hold more than one non-FIFA nationality.

No.	Pos.	Nation	Player
91	FW	GAM	Modou Keita (at Stal Stalowa Wola until 30 June 2027)
—	FW	CMR	Emmanuel Agbor (at Sūduva until 31 December 2026)

No.	Pos.	Nation	Player
—	MF	POL	Jarosław Czerwik (at Stal Stalowa Wola until 30 June 2027)

=== Notable players ===
Had international caps for their respective countries. Players listed in bold represented their countries while playing for Miedź.

Poland

- (Poland) Grzegorz Bartczak (2013–2020)
- (Poland) Andrzej Bledzewski (2011–2015)
- (Poland) Marcin Burkhardt (2013–2014)
- (Poland) Łukasz Garguła (2015–2019)
- (Poland) **Jarosław Gierejkiewicz** (1991–1992)
- (Poland) Tomasz Jarzębowski (2010–2011)
- (Poland) Romuald Kujawa (1999–2001)
- (Poland) Wojciech Łobodziński (2012–2019)
- (Poland) Piotr Madejski (2011–2014)
- (Poland) Mariusz Mowlik (2011–2014)
- (Poland) Marcin Nowacki (2011–2014)
- (Poland) Marcin Robak (2002–2005)
- (Poland) Michał Stasiak (2015–2017)
- (Poland) Bartosz Ślusarski (2015–2016)
- (Poland) Łukasz Załuska (2019–2020)

Albania

- (Albania) Enkeleid Dobi (2010)

Belarus

- (Belarus) Gleb Kuchko (2025–2026)

Bosnia and Herzegovina

- (Bosnia and Herzegovina) Adnan Kovačević (2024–)

Cape Verde

- (Cape Verde) Kadú Alves (2015)

Chile

- (Chile) Ángelo Henríquez (2022–2023)

Curacao

- (Curaçao) Jurich Carolina (2021–2024)

Croatia

- (Croatia) Mladen Bartulović (2017–2018)

Denmark

- (Denmark) Jens Martin Gammelby (2022)

Dominican Republic

- (Dominican Republic) **Carlos Heredia** (2019–2020)
- (Dominican Republic) **Carlos Julio Martínez** (2021–2023)

Estonia

- (Estonia) Artjom Artjunin (2016)
- (Estonia) **Henrik Ojamaa** (2018–2020)
- (Estonia) **Artur Pikk** (2018–2020)
- (Estonia) **Igor Subbotin** (2016)

Equatorial Guinea

- (Equatorial Guinea) **Iban Salvador** (2023–2024)

Finland

- (Finland) **Petteri Forsell** (2016–2017, 2018–2019)

Haiti

- (Haiti) **Kevin Lafrance** (2014–2015)

Latvia

- (Latvia) **Valērijs Šabala** (2015–2016)

Lithuania

- (Lithuania) Tadas Labukas (2015–2016)

Luxembourg

- (Luxembourg) Jan Ostrowski (2019–2020)

Montenegro

- (Montenegro) Nemanja Mijušković (2019–2024)

Netherlands

- (Netherlands) Luciano Narsingh (2022–2023)

North Macedonia

- (North Macedonia) Erdal Rakip (2026)

Sweden

- (Sweden) Gustav Engvall (2025–2026)

Trinidad and Tobago

- (Trinidad and Tobago) Keon Daniel (2014–2017)

== Honours ==
=== League ===
- I liga
  - Champions: 2017–18, 2021–22

=== Cups ===
- Polish Cup
  - Winners: 1991–92
- Polish Super Cup
  - Runners-up: 1992

=== European competitions ===
Miedź Legnica scores are given first in all scorelines.

Season	Competition	Round		Opponent	Home	Away	Aggregate
1992–93	UEFA Cup Winners' Cup	1Q	(France)	Monaco	0–1	0–0	0–1

== See also ==
- Miedź Legnica II (reserve team)
