= Jerzy Kruszczyński =

Polish footballer

Personal information
- Full name: Jerzy Kruszczyński
- Date of birth: 27 June 1958 (age 68)
- Place of birth: Szczecin, Poland
- Height: 1.72 m (5 ft 8 in)
- Position: Forward

Youth career
- 1970–1976: Pogoń Szczecin

Senior career*
Years	Team	Apps	(Gls)
1976–1978	Pogoń Szczecin		
1978–1983	Arkonia Szczecin		
1983–1985	Lechia Gdańsk	57	(39)
1985–1989	Lech Poznań	108	(30)
1989	Umeå		
1989–1990	Lechia Gdańsk	9	(3)

Managerial career
- Umeå Södra FF
- Gislaveds FF
- * Club domestic league appearances and goals

Jerzy Kruszczyński (born 27 June 1958) is a Polish former professional footballer who played as a forward. He was often referred to by the pseudonym Kruchy.

== Football ==
=== Early years ===
Growing up in Szczecin, Kruszczyński started playing for his local professional teams, Pogoń Szczecin and Arkonia Szczecin. He joined the Pogoń youth teams at the age of 12, before signing his first professional contract with Pogoń in 1976, aged 18. After twi seasons with Pogoń, Kruchy moved to rivals Arkonia. He stayed with them for five seasons until 1983.

=== Lechia Gdańsk ===
Kruchy joined Lechia Gdańsk in 1983, just after the team had won the Polish Cup and secured promotion to II liga, the second tier in Polish football. His first competitive match for Lechia was the Polish Super Cup final against Lech Poznań. Lechia ended up winning the final due to Kruszczyński's 88th-minute goal to secure a 1–0 win. His first season with the club was also Lechia's first ever season taking part in a continental competition, despite being in the second tier. Lechia were drawn with Italian and European giants, Juventus. Lechia lost 10–2 over both legs, with the home leg finishing 3–2 to Juventus, but with Kruszczyński scoring the second Lechia goal in the game, a penalty in the 63rd minute to put Lechia 2–1 ahead. The season was successful for both Lechia and Kruszczyński. Lechia won the II liga, securing promotion to the Ekstraklasa for the first time in 22 years, while he ended up being the league's top goal-scorer scoring 31 goals in 30 games, including hat-tricks in both games against arch rivals Arka Gdynia.

The following season Lechia were back in the top flight. While the season was not as spectacular in terms of goals scored or competitions they competed in, Lechia succeed in avoiding relegation, with Kruszczyński scoring an important 8 goals in 27 appearances.

=== Lech Poznań ===
Kruchy moved to Lech Poznań for the 1985–86 season. While at Lech, he didn't make the same goal scoring impact he initially had at Lechia, scoring six goals in his first season. In total, he made 108 league appearances and recorded 30 goals for Lech. The Lech team was much more competitive than Lechia, and offered him the chance to win more silverware. Lech won the Polish Cup in the 1987–88 season, and finished runners-up in the Polish Super Cup the following season, but failed to win the title while Kruszczyński was at the club. While at Lech, Kruchy competed in European competitions every season, two of these seasons being the UEFA Intertoto Cup. In his final season with Lech, the club beat Albanian team Flamurtari Vlorë in the first round, securing a second-round game against the Spanish giants Barcelona. Both legs finished 1–1, with Kruszczyński once again scoring from the penalty spot in the home leg. After finishing as a draw after extra-time, Barcelona went through after winning 5–4 on penalties.

=== Return to Lechia ===
After four seasons with Lech, Kruszczyński had a brief spell in Sweden with Umeå FC before returning to Lechia Gdańsk again. The stay at Lechia was only for half a season, with him scoring three goals in nine games for Lechia, before finally retiring from football.

=== Sweden ===
After returning from playing professional football, Kruchy moved to Sweden where he managed two female football teams, Umeå Södra FF, the female section of Umeå FC where he briefly played, and Gislaveds FF. In total he spent 10 years working in Sweden before returning to Poland.

== Personal life ==
Kruszczyński is commemorated by a star at the MOSiR Stadium in Gdańsk. The "Avenue of Stars" commemorates the efforts and success of former players and coaches.

== Honours ==
Lechia Gdańsk

- II liga West: 1983-84
- Polish Super Cup: 1983

Lech Poznań

- Polish Cup: 1987-88

Individual

- II liga top scorer: 1983-84
