= Piotr Jegor =

Polish footballer (1968–2020)

Personal information
- Date of birth: 13 June 1968
- Place of birth: Zbrosławice, Poland
- Date of death: 17 March 2020 (aged 51)
- Place of death: Knurów, Poland
- Height: 1.84 m (6 ft 0 in)
- Position: Defender

Youth career
- –1988: Górnik Knurów

Senior career*
Years	Team	Apps	(Gls)
1988–1994	Górnik Zabrze	173	(13)
1995	Hapoel Haifa	14	(0)
1995	Górnik Zabrze	6	(0)
1996	Stal Mielec	8	(1)
1996–2001	Odra Wodzisław Śląski	107	(13)
2001	BKS Stal Bielsko-Biała		
2002	Górnik Jastrzębie Zdrój		
2003	LKS Bełk		

International career
1989–1997	Poland	20	(1)
- * Club domestic league appearances and goals

Piotr Jegor (13 June 1968 – 17 March 2020) was a Polish professional footballer who played for Górnik Zabrze and Odra Wodzisław Śląski in the Polish Ekstraklasa.

Jegor has made 20 appearances for the Poland national football team, scoring one goal against Latvia.

== Career statistics ==
=== International goals ===
Scores and results list. Poland's goal tally first.

#	Date	Venue	Opponent	Score	Result	Competition
1.	17 February 1997	Anagennisi Football Ground, Derynia, Cyprus	Latvia	2–2	3–2	Friendly
