= Polonia Chodzież =

Polish football club

ChKS Polonia Chodzież
- Full name: Chodzieski Klub Sportowy; Polonia Chodzież
- Short name: Polonia Chodzież
- Founded: 1924; 102 years ago
- Stadium: Stanisław Kitkowski Stadium
- Capacity: 3,000
- Chairman: Tadeusz Jeśko
- Manager: Dawid Jasiński
- League: IV liga Greater Poland
- 2025–26: IV liga Greater Poland, 2nd of 18
Club colours

Polonia Chodzież is a Polish sports club from Chodzież, Greater Poland. It currently only has a men's and youth association football section.

The club used to be a multi-sports club with many other sports and teams. The club's table tennis team used to play in the top division in the 60s. Its other former sections were: basketball, track and field athletics, handball, volleyball, chess, and sailing.

When the club was founded in 1920s it was one of many competing sports societies in the city. In football, its biggest league success was reaching the third division in 1989, lasting 5 seasons. The club is known for numerous giant-killings in the Polish Cup; reaching the quarter-finals in 1955, 1/8th in 1992 and 1/16th in 1955. The club has frequently reached the main rounds of the cup throughout its history.
