= Ryszard Kraus =

Polish footballer (1964–2013)

Personal information
- Full name: Ryszard Władysław Kraus
- Date of birth: 30 June 1964
- Place of birth: Bestwina, Poland
- Date of death: 3 November 2013 (aged 49)
- Place of death: Bestwina, Poland
- Height: 1.79 m (5 ft 10 in)
- Position: Striker

Youth career
- 1979–1980: LZS Bestwina

Senior career*
Years	Team	Apps	(Gls)
1980–1987	GKS Jastrzębie		
1987–1988	Odra Wodzisław		
1989	GKS Jastrzębie	14	(6)
1989–1994	Górnik Zabrze	99	(33)
1994–1995	GKS Tychy		
1995–1996	LKS Bestwina		

International career
1991–1992	Poland	4	(0)
- * Club domestic league appearances and goals

Ryszard Władysław Kraus (30 June 1964 – 3 November 2013) was a Polish professional footballer who played as a striker.

== Club career ==
Kraus played for Ekstraklasa side Górnik Zabrze for five years, scoring 16 goals for them in the 1990–91 season.

== International career ==
Kraus made his debut for Poland in a February 1991 friendly match against Northern Ireland and earned a total of 4 caps, scoring no goals.

His final international was a July 1992 friendly match against Guatemala.

== Death ==
Kraus died on 3 November 2013.
