= Dominik Sadzawicki =

Polish footballer

Personal information
- Date of birth: 19 April 1994 (age 32)
- Place of birth: Poznań, Poland
- Height: 1.85 m (6 ft 1 in)
- Position: Right-back

Team information
- Current team: Szombierki Bytom

Youth career
- –2006: MKS Sławków
- 2006–2008: Zagłębie Sosnowiec
- 2008–2013: Gwarek Zabrze

Senior career*
Years	Team	Apps	(Gls)
2013–2014	GKS Katowice	25	(0)
2014–2016	Górnik Zabrze	30	(0)
2015–2016	Górnik Zabrze II	9	(1)
2017–2018	Stal Mielec	33	(0)
2018–2019	Termalica Nieciecza	12	(0)
2019–2021	Stal Rzeszów	10	(0)
2020	→ Pogoń Siedlce (loan)	10	(0)
2021–2023	Kotwica Kołobrzeg	15	(0)
2023–2024	Mazovia Mińsk Mazowiecki	34	(2)
2024–2025	Tygrys Huta Mińska	32	(0)
2025–2026	Mazur Karczew	18	(0)
2026–	Szombierki Bytom	0	(0)

International career
2014	Poland U20	5	(0)
- * Club domestic league appearances and goals as of 10:40, 5 July 2026 (UTC)

Dominik Sadzawicki (born 19 April 1994) is a Polish professional footballer who plays as a right-back for IV liga Silesia club Szombierki Bytom.

== Honours ==
Kotwica Kołobrzeg

- III liga, group II: 2021–22
