= Siarka Tarnobrzeg =

Polish football club

- Full name: Klub Sportowy; Siarka Tarnobrzeg
- Nicknames: Siarkowcy (The Sulfurists); Siarkoholicy (The Sulfur-holics)
- Founded: 1957; 69 years ago
- Ground: Tarnobrzeg Municipal Stadium
- Capacity: 3,770
- Chairman: Dariusz Dziedzic
- Manager: Sławomir Majak
- League: III liga, group IV
- 2025–26: III liga, group IV, 12th of 18
- Website: siarka-tarnobrzeg.pl
Home colours	Away colours

Siarka Tarnobrzeg (Polish pronunciation: [ˈɕarka tarˈnɔbʐɛk]) is a Polish professional football club, based in Tarnobrzeg, Subcarpathian Voivodeship. They compete in the fourth group of the III liga, the fourth tier of the national football league system. In early 1990s, Siarka played in the Ekstraklasa, with such players as Cezary Kucharski, Andrzej Kobylański, Tomasz Kiełbowicz and Mariusz Kukiełka.

== Honours ==
- Ekstraklasa
  - 11th place: 1992–93
- Polish Under-19 Championship
  - Runners-up: 1979
  - Third place: 1999

== Players ==
=== Current squad ===
As of 30 July 2025

Note: Flags indicate national team as defined under FIFA eligibility rules; some limited exceptions apply. Players may hold more than one non-FIFA nationality.

No.	Pos.	Nation	Player
—	GK	POL	Jakub Popiak
—	GK	POL	Jakub Raciniewski (on loan from Stal Rzeszów)
—	GK	POL	Hieronim Zoch
—	DF	POL	Michał Batelt
—	DF	POL	Piotr Kosior
—	DF	POL	Konrad Misztal
—	DF	POL	Filip Podkowa
—	DF	POL	Michael Wyparło
—	MF	POL	Bartosz Biś
—	MF	POL	Szymon Kaliniec
—	MF	POL	Krystian Kardyś
—	MF	POL	Kacper Marszalik

No.	Pos.	Nation	Player
—	MF	POL	Paweł Mróz
—	MF	UKR	Stanislav Nechyporenko
—	MF	POL	Kacper Nowakowski
—	MF	POL	Tomasz Płaneta
—	MF	POL	Franciszek Słowik
—	MF	POL	Oskar Tyniec
—	MF	POL	Bartosz Zawół
—	FW	ERI	Ezana Kahsay
—	FW	POL	Mikołaj Szkiela
—		POL	Maciej Fundament
—		POL	Jakub Piętowski
—		POL	Bartłomiej Witek

== Stadium ==
Tarnobrzeg Municipal Stadium
- Stadion Miejski w Tarnobrzegu
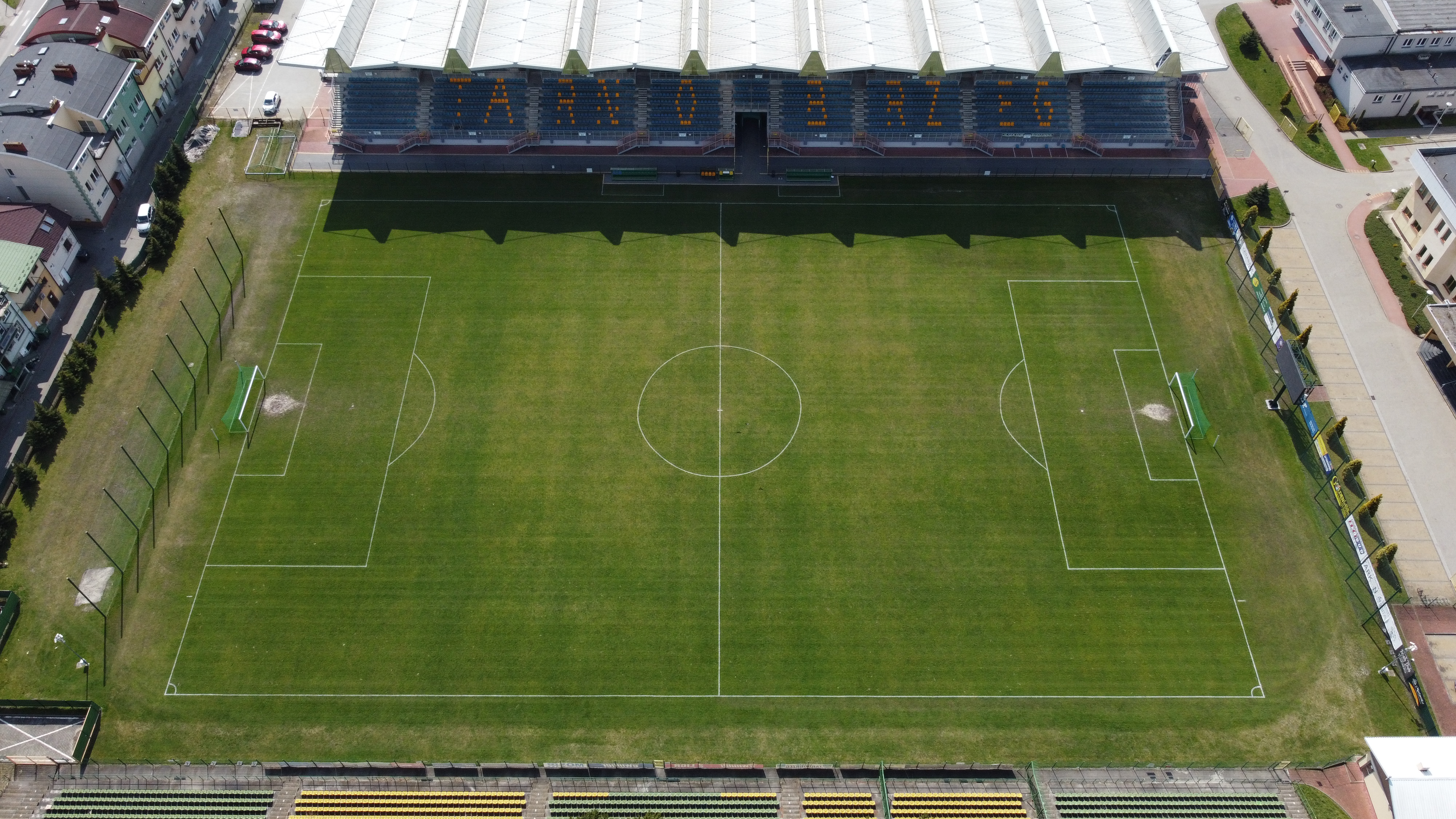
- Full name: Tarnobrzeg Municipal Stadium
- Location: Tarnobrzeg, Podkarpackie Voivodeship, Poland
- Capacity: 3,770 spectators

Construction
- Renovated: 2010–2011

Tenant
- Siarka Tarnobrzeg

The Tarnobrzeg Municipal Stadium (Polish: Stadion Miejski w Tarnobrzegu) is a football stadium in Tarnobrzeg, Poland. It can accommodate 3,770 spectators. The football club Siarka Tarnobrzeg plays its matches there. The stadium served as the venue for them during their three seasons in the Ekstraklasa.

The stadium is located in the southern part of the city, near the bus station. Due to the layout of the sports complex, the field is oriented east-west instead of the conventional north-south direction.

The main stand was built on the southern side, constructed from scratch between 2010 and 2011, with a prominent roof that dominates the surrounding area. Although it was opened in 2011, the structure was expanded until 2016, adding cabins to the top tier and additional support rooms on the ground floor. The renovation cost PLN 5.2 million. The first floor houses facilities for fans attending the matches.

On 7 September 2024, during a match between Siarka Tarnobrzeg (who prevailed) and Sandecja Nowy Sącz, a violent incident occurred when visiting supporters reacted aggressively to the display of a Stal Mielec flag. The destruction included uprooted seats, damaged toilets, and a broken fence, leading to the suspension of the game. The event resulted in significant damage to the stadium, and Siarka Tarnobrzeg has since sought compensation for repairs.

In 2025, the stadium hosted matches of the UEFA Women's Under-19 Championship.

== Gallery ==
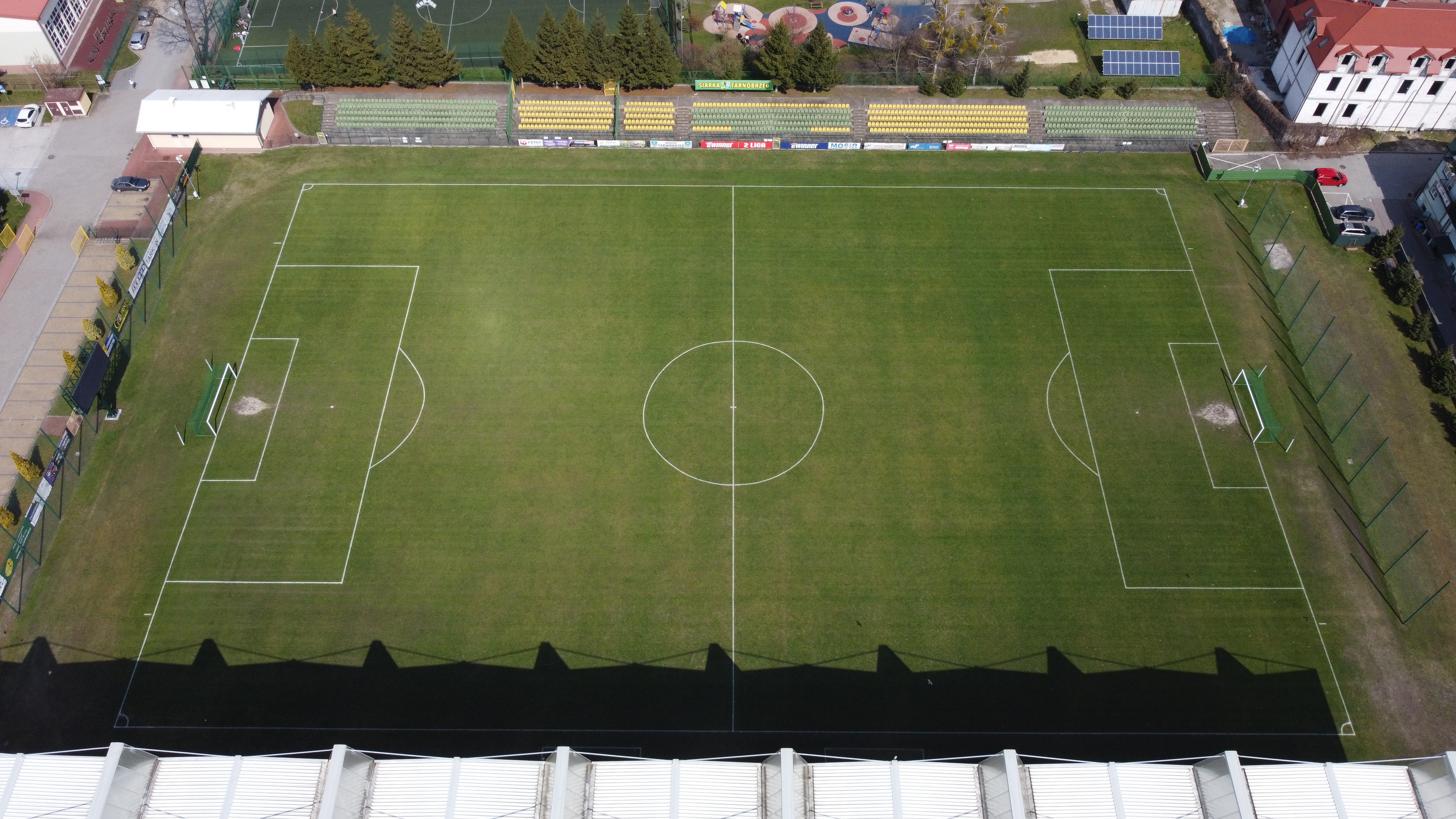
View of the open stands, 2023.

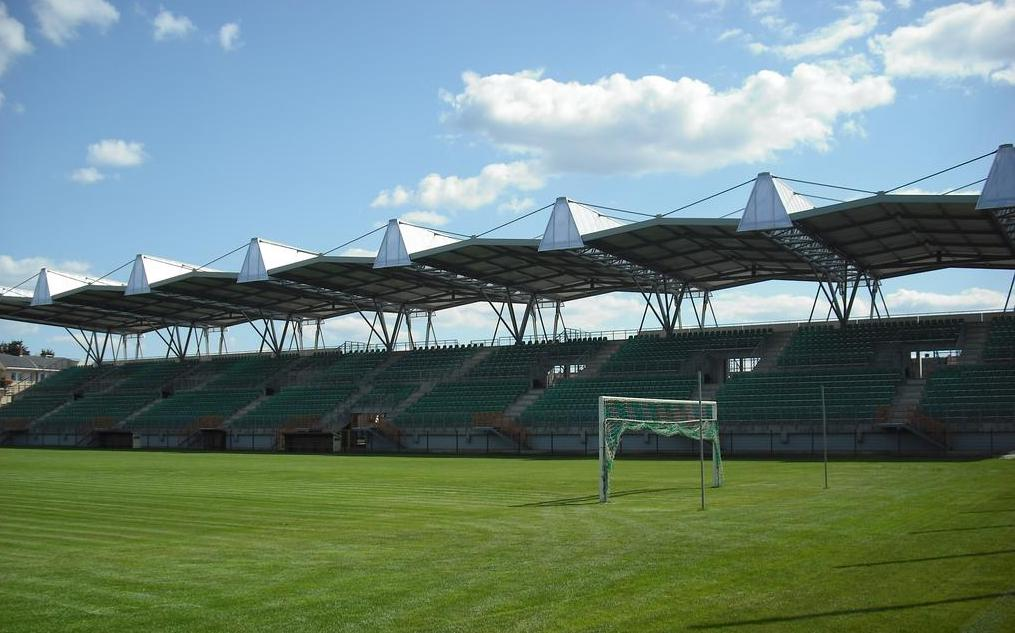
Covered stands before renovation, 2014.
