= Unia Tczew =

Polish sports club

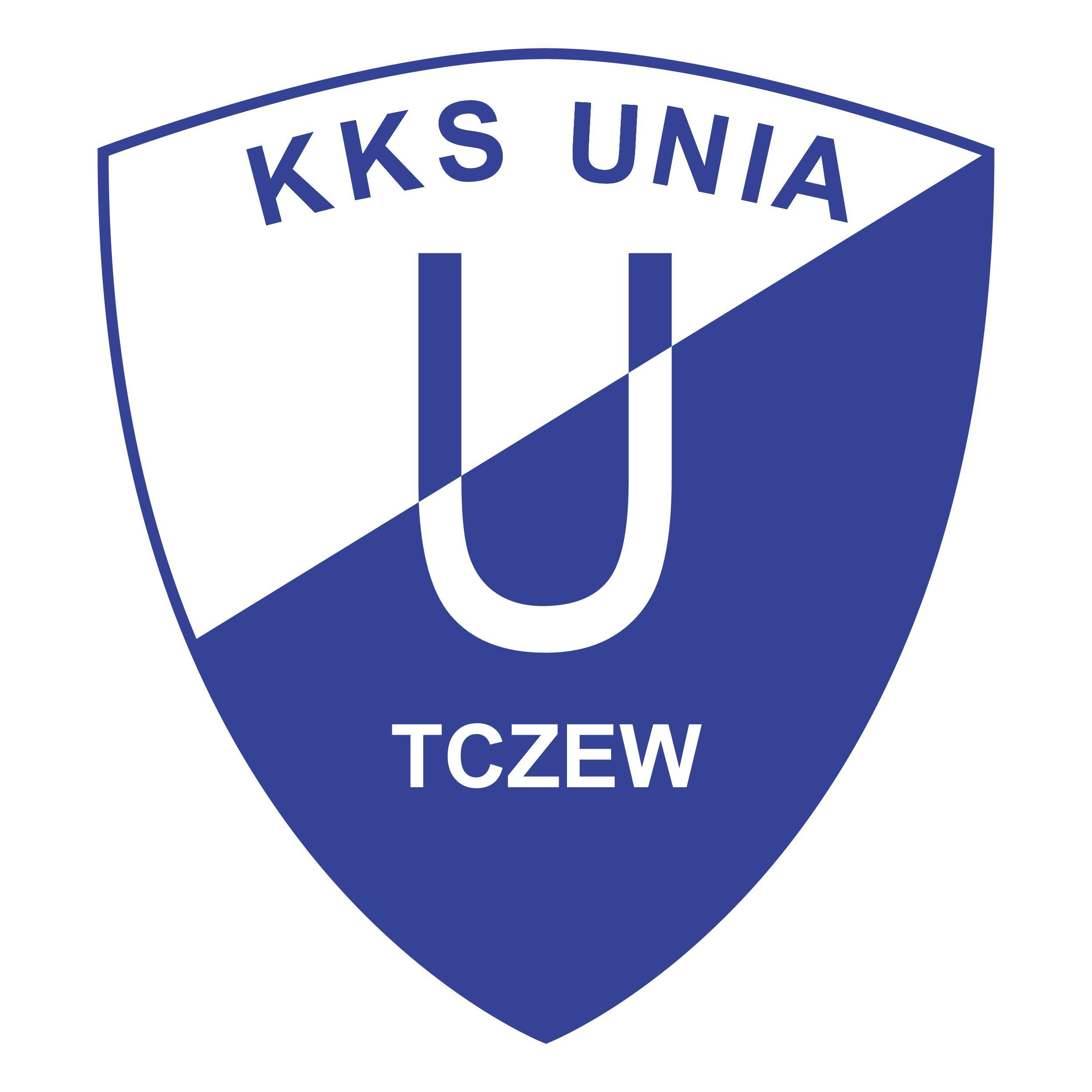
- Full name: Kolejowy Klub Sportowy; Unia 1922 Tczew
- Nickname(s): Duma Kociewia (transl. The Pride of Kociewia); Biało-Granatowi (transl. The White and Navy); Kolejarze (transl. The Railwaymen)
- Founded: 25 November 1922; 102 years ago
- Ground: Municipal Stadium
- Capacity: 1,300
- President: Jacek Prętki
- League: IV liga Pomerania
- 2008/9: 15th of 16
- Website: unia.tczew.pl
| Home colours | Away colours |

Unia Tczew is a sports club based in Tczew, Poland. The sports club was created in 1922 and is separated into two areas, football and rowing.

== Football ==
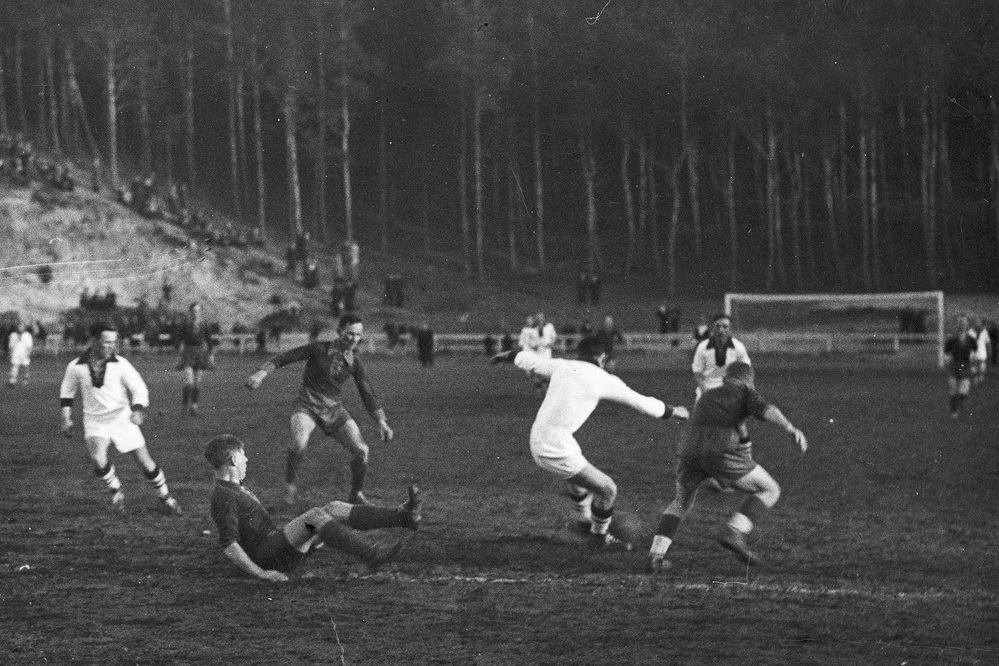
away game vs Bałtyk Gdynia, 1936

The club was founded in 1922 as Tczewski Sports Club changing its name in 1924 to TKS Olympia Tczew. In 1929 the team joined the Pomeranian OZPN and received support from the Railway Military Training and as a result became KPW Unia Tczew. In 1938, Unia achieved their greatest success in their inter-war history - 3rd place in Class A (second tier). In the 2006–07 season, Unia advanced from the District Class to the IV liga. Unia remained in the league until the 2008–09 season, when the team appeared in the reformed Pomeranian IV liga (fifth level). In 2009, the football section was merged with Wisła Tczew creating Gryf 2009 Tczew. After the merger the club never officially reformed with a first team in the Polish leagues. In 2012 however to celebrate 90 years since the team's creation, Unia was reformed again for the 2012–13 Polish Cup, playing a total of three games in their run. The club has fielded teams in the regional Polish Cup since, but has not entered a team into a league competition since 2009, now focusing on running the club with the main focus being on youth development and on youth teams.

== Rowing ==
The rowing section was created in 1926 and joined the Maritime and Colonial League. In 1929 the team joined the Unia Tczew sports club, and competed for the first time the same year. The team took the silver medal at that years Polish Championships. The club had varying results of success after the Second World War, and poor results since the 1990s, not finishing in the top 20 of the standings in Poland in any given year.

The most famous rowers who trained with Unia in their youth include; Barbara Wenta-Wojciechowska, Czesława Kościańska and Mateusz Biskup.

== Historic club names ==
- 1922: Tczewski Klub Sportowy
- 1924: Tczewski Klub Sportowy Olympia
- 1929: Klub Sportowy Kolejowego Przysposobienia Wojskowego Unia
- 1945: Kolejowy Klub Sportowy Unia
- 1950: Koło Sportowe Kolejarz
- 1957: Kolejowy Klub Sportowy Unia
- 1997: Stowarzyszenie Piłkarskie KKS Unia
- 2007: Stowarzyszenie Piłkarskie Tczewski KP Unia
- 2009: Gryf 2009 Tczew (merger created with Wisła Tczew)
- 2012: Kolejowy Klub Sportowy Unia 1922 (independent Unia team)

== Honours ==
=== Football ===
- Class A: 3rd place – (1938)
- III liga: (2) 3rd place – (1959, 1960)
- Polish Cup: 1/32 final – 1969–70
