= Olimpia Poznań =

Polish sports club

- Nickname: Olimpijczycy
- Founded: 1945
- Dissolved: 2005 (football section only)
- Ground: Olimpia Stadium, Poznań, Poland
- Capacity: 20 000
- Chairman: Jerzy Strzykała
- League: IV liga (V tier)

Olimpia Poznań is a Polish multi-sport club from Poznań. It has athletics, archery, basketball, boxing, kendo, judo, swimming, tennis, and triathlon sections. The sections are formally independent of each other, sharing the history and name only. The football section, once a top-flight team for many years folded in 2005.

The club still is a large sports complex surrounded by Lake Rusałka, a large city recreation area: a Tennis Park where the Poznań Open is held; mountain biking facilities including a four-cross track; an athletics stadium (capacity 3000); and a speedway-football stadium (capacity 20 000), which fell into vast disrepair until it was acquired by the city council from the police in 2013 and was renovated. The football-speedway stadium hosts speedway club PSŻ Poznań, rugby union side NKR Chaos, American football team the Poznań Patriots, and football team Poznaniak Poznań.

The club initially was owned by the civic military police, and therefore for many years the club was considered one of the "Gwardian" clubs. For this reason the club was poorly supported compared to the other professional teams in the city, Warta and Lech.

In the late 80s and 90s the football section was a regular Ekstraklasa team.

After the fall of communism the club lost its government backing and the club's fortunes started to drastically decline. The club's individual sections became separate entities due to financial issues, several sections were shut down. The club's facilities became outdated and many of them became abandoned and severely under-repaired. The club remained in the hands of the police force, which after 1989 was called Policja (as opposed to Milicja); the police however severely neglected the club and its facilities, as did the management of the club causing all the sections to close one by one, with the surviving ones only doing so through acting independently of and separating themselves from the parent club.

In 1995 the football section of Olimpia Poznań was moved from Poznań and merged with Lechia Gdańsk in 1995 creating Olimpia-Lechia Gdańsk. The Olimpia-Lechia Gdańsk merger lasted only one season before both clubs were separate entities again. For Lechia they were already in the third division by 1997. The club tried to rescue its fall through another merger with local club Polonia Gdańsk and changing its name to Lechia-Polonia Gdańsk, with Antoni Ptak's company as the main sponsor. In 2001 Lechia decided to leave the merger, and started as an independent club from the bottom of the football pyramid as the sole legal and spiritual continuation of BKS Lechia, which folded the merged club in 2002. Polonia also had to restart from the bottom of the footballing pyramid after they set up an independent club from the merger in 1999.

After the 1995 merger, the reserve football team became the senior side, which then played in the IV liga. However the stadium fell into the disrepair, the club's finances were mismanaged and the club fell into obscurity, as well as allegations of corruption and involvement of organised crime groups in its structures.

Finally in 2005 the football section was dissolved, however the judo and tennis sections which has long severed its police ties have thrived. The basketball teams, in particular the women's side has some success and support in recent years, due to lack of competition in the sport of other clubs, however the basketball section too fell into obscurity. The football-speedway stadium was restored mostly thanks to the efforts of speedway fans and activists of PSŻ Poznań, supported by several other sports.

== Bibliography ==
- Adam Drygalski (October 2020), Milicjanci, cuda, fuzje. Historia Olimpii Poznań (in Polish), Skarby Miasta – Poznań 2020, archived from the original on 23 January 2025
- Jakub Malicki (21 December 2017), Trzy poznańskie Olimpie (in Polish), PolskieLogo.net
- Jacek Jaśkowiak (21 November 2013), TS Olimpia to relikt socjalizmu (in Polish), Głos Wielkopolski
- Robert Domżał (14 June 2012), Poznań: Co dalej ze stadionem TS Olimpia (in Polish), Głos Wielkopolski
- Andrzej Banas, Amica, Olimpia, Gwardia - polskie kluby, o których słuch zaginął (in Polish), gol24.pl
- Jakub Ptak (28 May 2020), Ćwierć wieku od ostatnich derbów Poznania. 26 maja 1995 roku Lech zagrał z Olimpią w ostatnich derbach stolicy Wielkopolski (in Polish), TVP Sport
- "Olimpia Poznań profile". 90minut.pl.
