= Arkadiusz =

Male given name

- Pronunciation: Polish: [arˈka.djuʂ]
- Gender: Male
- Language: Polish

Origin
- Region of origin: Poland

Other names
- Related names: Arcadius, Arcadio, Arkady

Arkadiusz (Polish: [arˈka.djuʂ]) is a masculine Polish given name. Notable people with the name include:

- Arkadiusz Aleksander (born 1980), Polish football player
- Arkadiusz Bachur (1961–1995), Polish equestrian
- Arkadiusz Baran (born 1979), Polish football player
- Arkadiusz Bazak (born 1939), Polish actor
- Arkadiusz Bieńkowski (1938–2007), Polish footballer
- Arkadiusz Bilski (born 1973), Polish football player
- Arkadiusz Bąk (born 1974), Polish footballer
- Arkadiusz Czarnecki (born 1987), Polish footballer
- Arkadiusz Czartoryski (born 1966), Polish politician
- Arkadiusz Gardzielewski (born 1986), Polish long-distance runner
- Arkadiusz Gmur (born 1966), Polish footballer
- Arkadiusz Godel (born 1952), Polish fencer
- Arkadiusz Gołaś (1981–2005), Polish volleyball player
- Arkadiusz Głowacki (born 1979), Polish footballer
- Arkadiusz Jakubik (born 1969), Polish actor
- Arkadiusz Janiak (born 1963), Polish sprinter
- Arkadiusz Jędrych (born 1992), Polish footballer
- Arkadiusz Kaliszan (born 1972), retired Polish professional footballer
- Arkadiusz Kasperkiewicz (born 1994), Polish footballer
- Arkadiusz Klimek (born 1975), Polish professional footballer
- Arkadiusz Korobczynski, Polish Cold War pilot, defector to Sweden in 1949
- Arkadiusz Kubik (born 1972), Polish footballer
- Arkadiusz Kułynycz (born 1992), Polish Greco-Roman wrestler
- Arkadiusz Leniart (born 1991), Polish chess player
- Arkadiusz Litwiński (born 1970), Polish politician
- Arkadiusz Malarz (born 1980), Polish goalkeeper
- Arkadiusz Marchewka (born 1986), Polish politician
- Arkadiusz Michalski (born 1990), Polish weightlifter
- Arkadiusz Miklosik (born 1975), retired Polish footballer
- Arkadiusz Milik (born 1994), Polish footballer
- Arkadiusz Miłoszewski (born 1973), Polish basketball coach and former player
- Arkadiusz Moryto (born 1997), Polish handball player
- Arkadiusz Mularczyk (born 1971), Polish politician
- Arkadiusz Myrcha (born 1984), Polish politician
- Arkadiusz Mysona (born 1981), Polish football player
- Arkadiusz Najemski (born 1996), Polish footballer
- Arkadiusz Onyszko (born 1974), Polish goalkeeper
- Arkadiusz Ossowski (born 1996), Polish handball player
- Arkadiusz Pawłowski (born 1956), Polish paralympic swimmer
- Arkadiusz Piech (born 1985), Polish footballer
- Arkadiusz Protasiuk (1974–2010), Polish Air Force pilot
- Arkadiusz Pyrka (born 2002), Polish footballer
- Arkadiusz Radomski (born 1977), Polish footballer
- Arkadiusz Reca (born 1995), Polish footballer
- Arkadiusz Rojek (born 1972), Polish footballer
- Arkadiusz Rybicki (1953–2010), Polish politician
- Arkadiusz Ryś (born 1988), Polish footballer
- Arkadiusz Skrzypaszek (born 1968), Polish modern pentathlete
- Arkadiusz Sobkowiak (born 1973), Polish rower
- Arkadiusz Sojka (born 1980), former Polish footballer
- Arkadiusz Sowa (born 1979), Polish marathon runner
- Arkadiusz Szczygieł (born 1975), Polish footballer
- Arkadiusz Trochanowski (born 1973), Polish-Ukrainian bishop
- Arkadiusz Wojtas (born 1977), Polish cyclist
- Arkadiusz Woźniak (born 1990), Polish footballer
- Arkadiusz Wrzosek (born 1992), Polish kickboxer and mixed martial artist
