= Arkadiy =

Arkadiy (Russian: Аркадий) is a Russian male given name. It is derived from the name of the Greek region Arcadia. Notable individuals with the surname include:

== People ==
- Arkadiy Abramovich (born 1993), heir to Roman Abramovich, Russian billionaire
- Arkadiy Akopyan (born 1984), Russian professional footballer, currently playing for FC Dynamo Bryansk
- Arkadiy Alov (1914–1982), Soviet Russian football player, coach and referee
- Arkadiy Babchenko (born 1977), Russian print and television journalist
- Arkadiy Belinkov (1921–1970), Russian writer and literary critic
- Arkadiy Bondarenko (born 1996), Russian football player
- Arkadiy Chernyshev (1914–1992), Soviet ice hockey and soccer player
- Arkadiy Dobrovolskyi (1887–1956), Ukrainian archaeologist
- Arkadiy Holovchenko (born 1936), Ukrainian former swimmer
- Arkadiy Imrekov (born 1985), Russian professional football manager and a former player
- Arkadiy Kiselyov (1880–1938), politician of the Ukrainian SSR, and Prosecutor General from 1935 to 1936
- Arkadiy Kornatskyi (born 1953), Ukrainian politician
- Arkadiy Krasavin (born 1967), Russian professional football coach and a former player
- Arkadiy Lobzin (born 1997), Russian football player
- Arkadiy Malisov (born 1967), retired Georgian professional football player
- Arkadiy Migdal (1911–1991), Soviet physicist and member of the USSR Academy of Sciences
- Arkadiy Ivanovich Morkov (1747–1827), Russian noble (count) and diplomat
- Arkadiy Pogodin (1901–1975), Soviet singer who worked in variety theater and operetta
- Arkadiy Semyonov (born 1959), Russian poet, founder of group Vezhliviy Otkaz
- Arkadiy Sergeev (born 1986), Russian former competitive ice dancer
- Arkadiy Shestakov (ice hockey) (born 1995), Kazakh ice hockey player
- Arkadiy Shestakov (politician) (1939–2002), Ukrainian politician
- Arkadiy Dmitrievich Shvetsov (1892–1953), Soviet aircraft engine designer
- Arkadiy Simanov (born 1992), Russian professional association football player
- Arkadiy Ismailovich Sukhorukov, professor and expert on economic security issues
- Arkadiy Topayev (born 1971), Kazakh boxer
- Arkadiy Tumanyan (born 1998), professional Armenian and Ukrainian football midfielder
- Arkadiy Tyapkin (1895–1942), association football player
- Arkadiy Vaksberg (1927–2011), Russo-Soviet investigative journalist, historian, filmmaker, and playwright
- Arkadiy Vasilyev (born 1987), Russian decathlete

== See also ==
- Arkadi
- Arkady
