= Arkady =

Name list

Arkady (Russian: Арка́дий, romanized: Arkadiy) is a Slavic masculine given name, ultimately derived from the Greek name Αρκάδιος, meaning “from Arcadia”. Endeared versions of the name are Arkasha. The Latin equivalent is Arcadius. Notable people with the name include:

People:

- Arkady Andreasyan (1947–2020), Armenian former football player and manager
- Arkadios Dimitrakopoulos (1824–1908), Greek merchant
- Arcady Aris (1901–1942), Chuvash writer
- Arkady Averchenko (1881–1925), Russian playwright and satirist
- Arkady Babchenko (born 1977), Russian journalist
- Arcady Boytler (1895–1965), Russian Mexican filmmaker
- Arkady Mikhailovich Chernetsky (born 1950), mayor of Yekaterinburg, Sverdlovsk Oblast, Russia from 1992 to 2010
- Arkady Chernyshev (1914–1992), Soviet ice hockey and soccer player
- Arkady Fiedler (1894–1985), Polish writer, journalist and adventurer
- Arkady Filippenko (1912–1983), Soviet Ukrainian composer
- Arkady Gaidar (1904–1941), Soviet writer whose stories were very popular among Soviet children
- Arkady Kots (1872–1943), Russian proletarian poet of Jewish descent
- Arkady Luxemburg (born 1939), Moldovan composer
- Arkady Malov (1928–1995), Chuvash poet and translator
- Arkady Migdal (1911–1991), Soviet physicist, member of the USSR Academy of Sciences
- Arkady Mordvinov (1896–1964), Soviet architect and construction manager
- Arkady Nebolsin (1865–1917), Russian admiral
- Arkady Plastov (1893–1972), Russian social realist painter
- Arkady Pogodin (1901–1975), Soviet singer
- Arkady Raikin (1911–1987), Soviet stand up comedian of Jewish descent
- Arcady Ruderman (1950–1992), Belarusian documentary filmmaker
- Arkady Rylov (1870–1939), Russian and Soviet Symbolist painter
- Arkady Severny (1939–1980), Soviet Russian folk singer
- Arkady Shevchenko (1930–1998), Ukrainian Soviet diplomat who defected to the West
- Arkady Sobolev (1903–1964), Russian Soviet diplomat and ambassador to the United Nations
- Arkady Strugatsky (1925–1991), Soviet Russian science fiction author
- Arkady Ter-Tadevosyan (1939–2021), military leader of the Armenian forces during the Nagorno-Karabakh War
- Arkady Ukupnik (born 1953), Russian composer, pop singer, actor and producer.
- Arcadi Volodos (born 1972), Russian pianist
- Arkady Volsky (1932–2006), Russian politician
- Arkady Vorobyov (1924–2012), Russian Soviet middle-heavyweight weightlifter
- Arkady Vyatchanin (born 1984), Russian swimmer who competes in the backstroke events
- Arcady Zhukov, Russian scientist

Fictional characters:

- Arkady Bogdanov, engineer and political figure in Kim Stanley Robinson's Mars trilogy
- Arkady Darell, teenage heroine in Isaac Asimov's Foundation series
- Arkady Dolgoruky, teenage hero in Fyodor Dostoyevsky's novel The Raw Youth
- Arkady Ivanovich, in the TV series The Americans
- Arkady Kirilenko, antagonist in the video game Battlefield: Bad Company 2
- Arkady Kirsanov, in Ivan Turgenev's novel Fathers and Sons
- Arkady Kolcheck, a recurring character in the American TV series NCIS: Los Angeles
- Arkady Grigorovich Ourumov, a Russian general who's secretly a henchman of the Janus crime syndicate in the 1995 James Bond film GoldenEye
- Arkady Renko, fictional detective, central character of seven novels by the American writer Martin Cruz Smith
- Omega Red (Arkady Rossovich), in comic books published by Marvel Comics
- Arkady Ivanovich Svidrigailov, antagonist in Dostoyevsky's novel Crime and Punishment
- Arkady, feral dragon, side character in Naomi Novik's book series Temeraire

== See also ==
- Arcadia (ancient region), a region in Ancient Greece poetically associated with a tradition of rural, bucolic innocence
- Arcadia, a region in modern Greece
- ARCADY, traffic modelling software
- Arkadi, a former Cretian municipality famous for the Arkadi Monastery
- Arkadios II of Cyprus (died 643), Monothelite archbishop of Cyprus
- Arkadiy, Russian masculine given name
- Arcady (disambiguation), various meanings
- Arcadius (disambiguation), various meanings
- Arkadiusz (Polish cognate)
