= Arcady =

Arcady may refer to:

- Arcady Ensemble, a Canadian musical ensemble
- ARCADY, traffic modelling software
- Alexandre Arcady (born 1975), French actor and film maker
- USS Arcady (SP-577), US Navy ship
- Arcadia (ancient region), a region in Ancient Greece poetically associated with a tradition of rural, bucolic innocence
- Arcadia (regional unit), a region in modern Greece

== See also ==
- Arcadius (disambiguation) Latin name
- Arcadia (disambiguation)
- Arcadie, French homophile organization
- Arkady, a list of people with a Russian given name (sometimes spelt with a c)
- Arkadiusz, a list of people with a Polish given name
