= Eighth Creative Union of MEPhI =

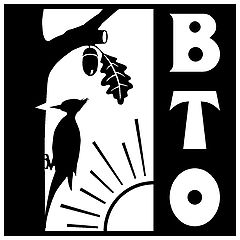
- The ECU insignia
- Address: Moscow; Russia

Construction
- Opened: 1969

The Eighth Creative Union (ECU) of Moscow Engineering Physics Institute (MEPhI) (Russian: Восьмое творческое объединение (ВТО) Московского инженерно-физического института (МИФИ), romanized: Vos'moe tvorcheskoe ob"edinenie (VTO) Moskovskogo inzhenerno-fizicheskogo instituta (MIFI)) is a creative and interdisciplinary team unifying students, graduates, postgraduate students and the university lecturers and professors. The ECU implies a variety of activities including a student theatre of pop sketches, arrangement of concerts and performances, scriptwriting, arrangement of night entertainment events and conventions, issuing of wall newspapers along with prose, poetry and playwriting almanacs, participating in Singer-Songwriter Club and Club of the Funny and Inventive People and Sharp-witted activities and taking part in different shows and competitions.

== History of the ECU ==
The Union was founded at Physics and Power Engineering Faculty of Moscow National Research Nuclear University MEPhI in accordance with the Faculty Komsomol (Young Communist League) Committee decree. Its stage debut was on 13 December 1969. Its first President was Oleg Yurievich Fyodorov, a former captain of 1962 Institute CCS (Club of the Cheerful and Sharp-witted. Russian: Клуб Веселых и Находчивых) team.

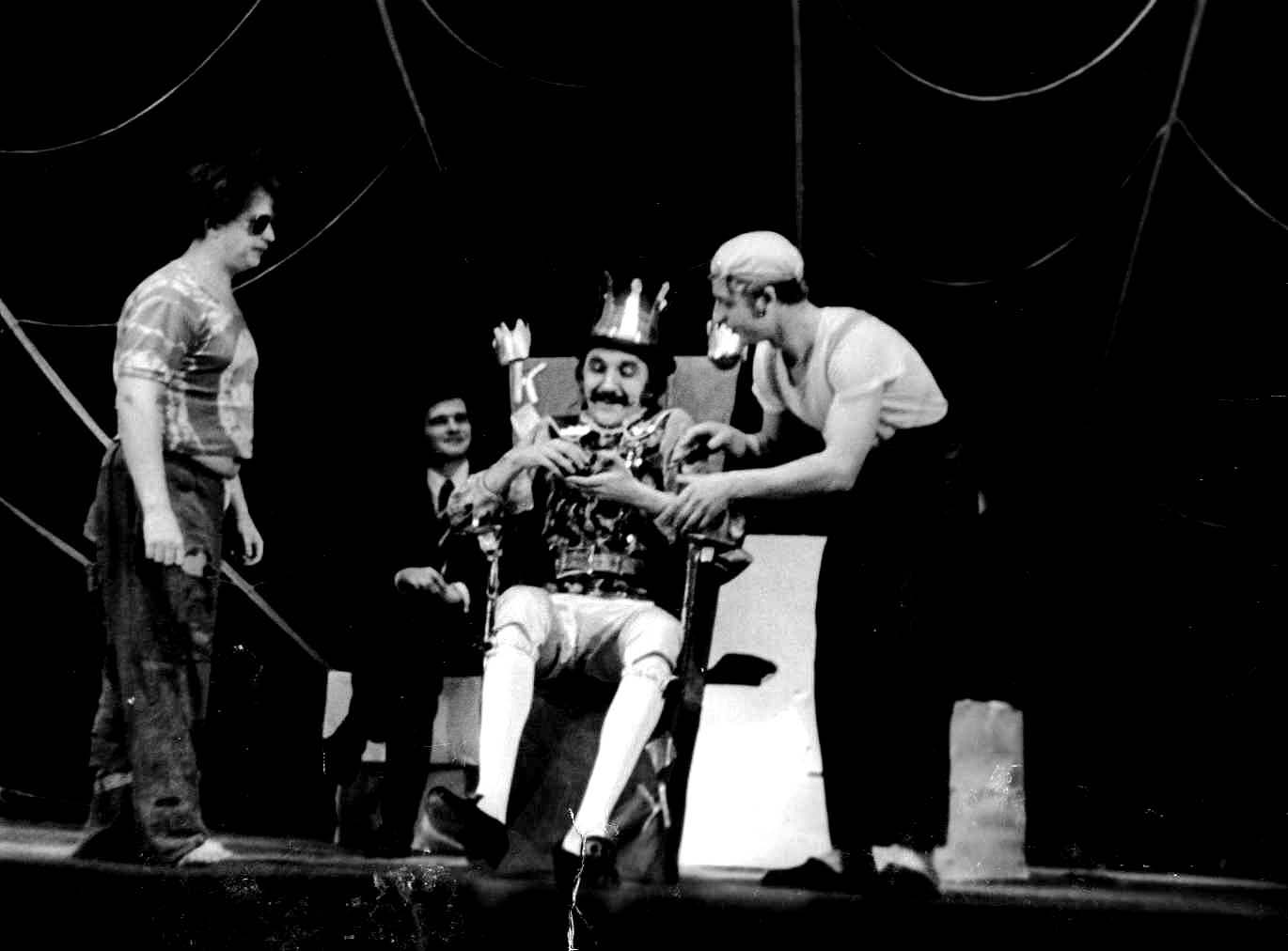
The performance in 1974 "We stay!"

== Traditions ==
First-year Student's Day is celebrated annually on 1 September. The ECU have conducted a theatrical performance for the first-year students of all faculties since 1 September 1974.

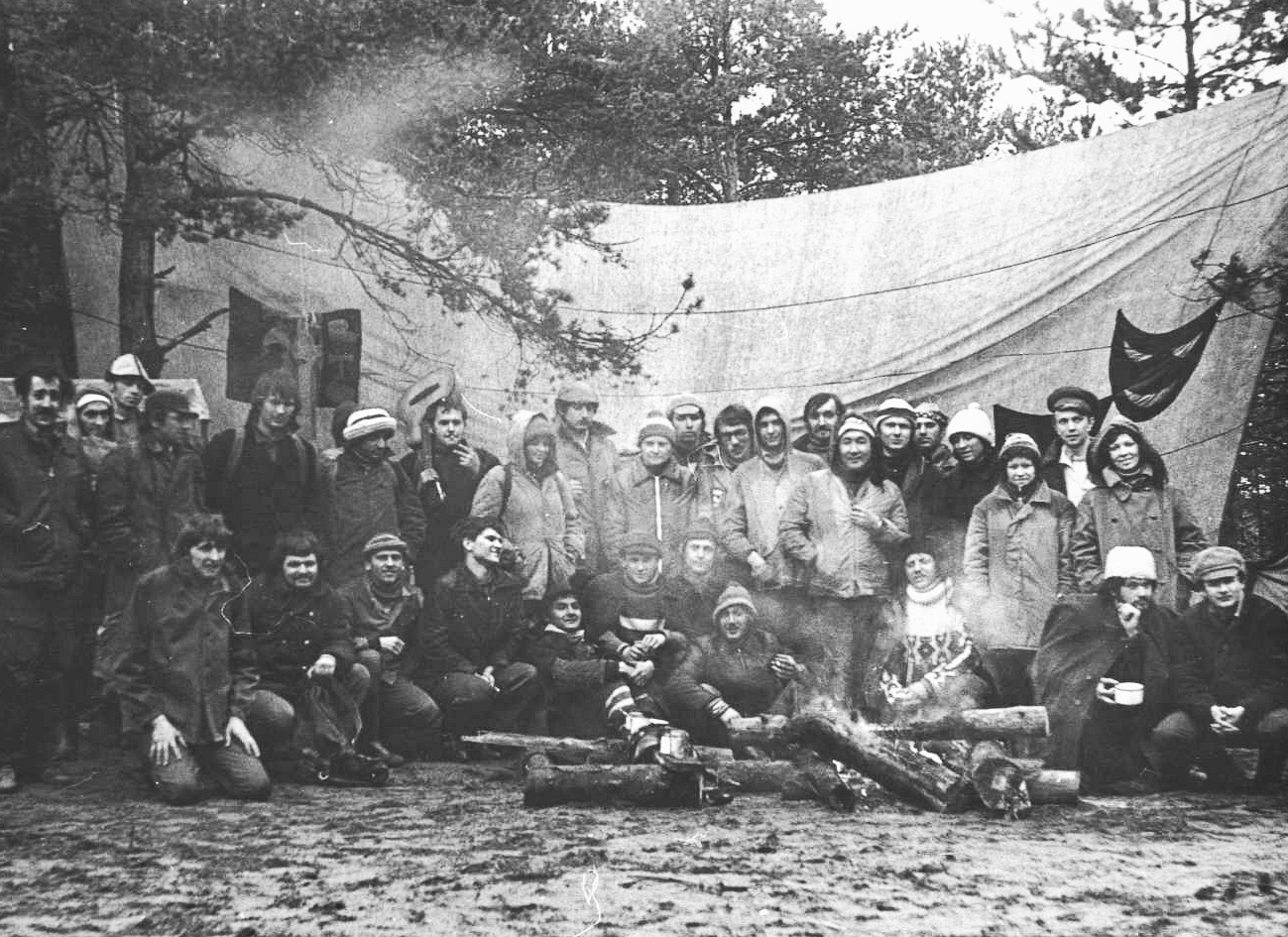
1980. The coldest convention of ECU in the village of Sknyatino

Propaganda teams. They are small creative ECU teams which used to go on tour to remote areas of the country in the Soviet times. The first propaganda team went to Naberezhnye Chelny in 1974 when Kamaz was being erected. The final trip of that sort was made in July 1989.

MEPhI Club of the Funny and Inventive People. It is a part of the ECU which was finally formed at the end of the 1990s. V. Shambarov remembers that "In 1969 when the ECU was established there were several groups of the guys. One group which included Kolya Artem’ev and Nina Gulova wanted to establish a theatre. The guys from the other group headed by Khutsiev wanted to take part in Club of the Funny and Inventive People (KVN) competition. As they had come to an agreement they established something in between, a theatre of KVN style."

== Film and video production ==
In 1990 the ECU shot an introduction video of MEPhI KVN team required for participation in the First All-Union KVN Festival in Dnipropetrovsk (script by A. Selin, directed by A. Yazlovsky). It was a parody of The Government Inspector by Nikolai Gogol. The action took place in the National Opera of Ukraine.

== Rewards ==
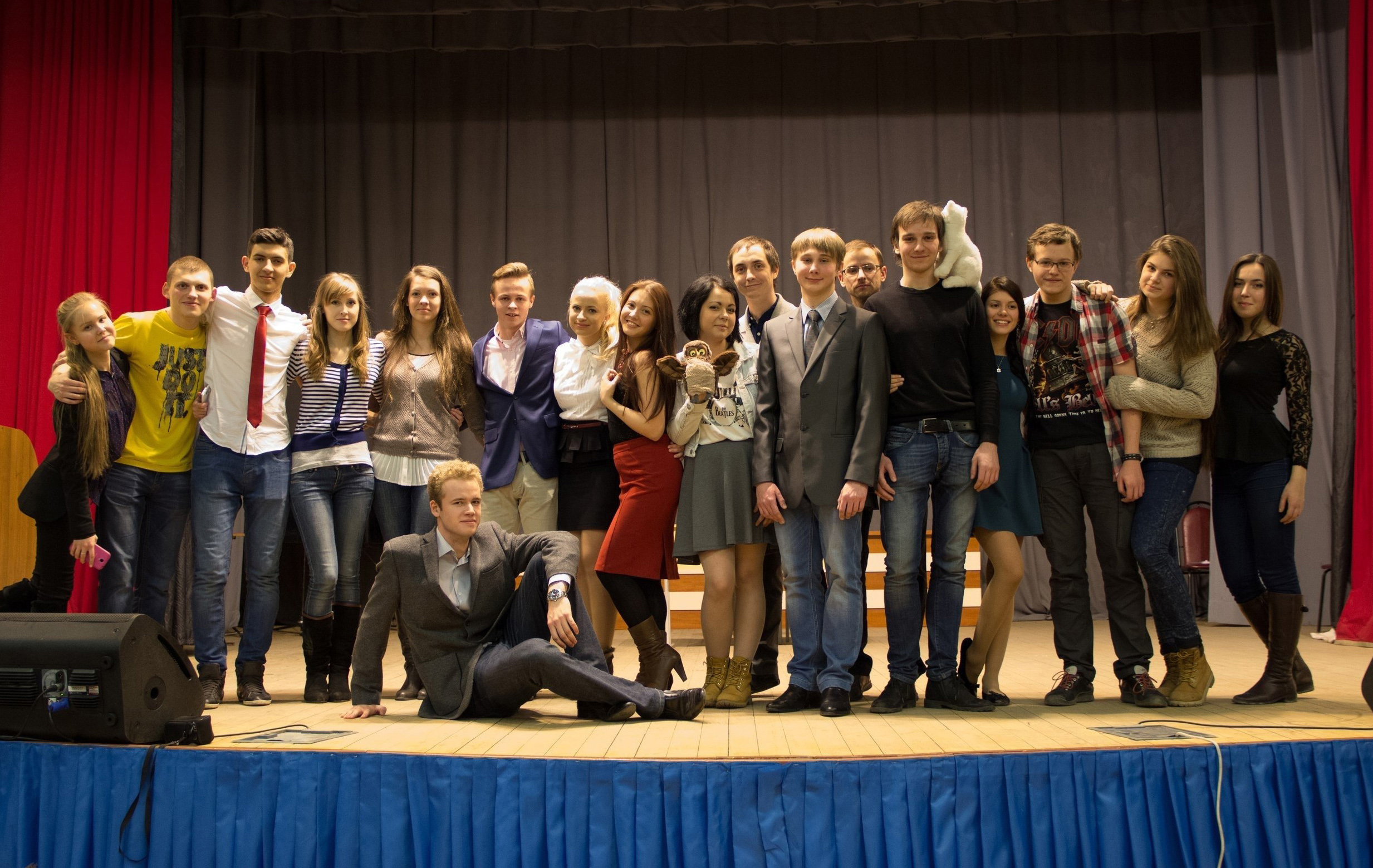
2014. The ECU team members on the stage of MEPhI assembly hall with their show "How I met the Deputy Dean".

- 1975 performance "Thunderstorm"; written by V. Shambarov, directed by A. Golikov won the laureate title at Moscow contest devoted to the 30th anniversary of Eastern Front (World War II).

== The ECU famous names ==
- Selin Alexander (1958–2014) is a writer, stage director, literature activist and the author of two novels and storybook New Romantic (Noviy Romantik Russian: «Новый романтик»). Also he was one of the ECU administrators and an author of plays and short short stories.
- Semyonov Arkadiy is a Russian rock poet, one of the founders of rock groups the "27th Kilometer" and the "Polite Refusal" (Russian: "Вежливый отказ") and an author of some of their songs. He was one of the ECU administrators and an author of plays and short short stories.

== Bibliography ==
- Vetlina N. The ECU are performing. Gazeta Kamskie Zori (Kama Dawns), 27 July 1974, p. 4 (in Russian).
- Photo report on The First-year Student Day in MEPhI. Gazeta Moskovskiy Komsomolets (Moscow Comsomol Member), 8 September 1974, p. 4 (in Russian).
- Photo report on Winter Farewell Event by V. Stepanov. Gazeta Komsomolskaya Pravda (Komsomol Truth), 16 March 1977, p. 4 (in Russian).
- Photo report on MEPhI First-year Students’ Convention by V. Stepanov. Gazeta Komsomolskaya Pravda (Komsomol Truth), 17 September 1978, p. 4 (in Russian).
- Kozlov M., Tikhonov O. The Creative Union are celebrating jubilee. Gazeta Inzhener-fizik (Engineering Physicist), 23 December 1974, p. 2 (in Russian).
- Perezhogin V. Theater season of MEPhI students. Gazeta Inzhener-fizik (Engineering Physicist), 16 October 1976, p. 2 (in Russian).
- Tregubova E. Festival of Humour. Gazeta Inzhener-fizik (Engineering Physicist), 20 April 1974, p. 2 (in Russian).
- Sokolov A., Podkidyshev A. Unforgettable event. Gazeta Inzhener-fizik (Engineering Physicist), 6 October 1975, no. 30, p. 2 (in Russian).
- Levin A., Bystrov A. Beyond April Fool's Day traditions. Gazeta Inzhener-fizik (Engineering Physicist), 18 April 1986, p. 2 (in Russian).
- Chebykin R. KVN. Losing which was almost equal to winning. Gazeta Inzhener-fizik (Engineering Physicist), June 1998, no. 11–12, p. 8 (in Russian).
- Arkhipova E. Shambarov's buddy tales. Gazeta Inzhener-fizik (Engineering Physicist), June 1999, no. 10–11, p. 8 (in Russian).
- Matushkina A. Hurrah! We have won! Gazeta Inzhener-fizik (Engineering Physicist), June 1999, no. 10–11, p. 8 (in Russian).
- Kotel’nikov P. Convetion. Gazeta Inzhener-fizik (Engineering Physicist), September 1999, no. 12–13, p. 4 (in Russian).
- Matushkina A. You can do your utmost but the ECU will win anyway. Gazeta Inzhener-fizik (Engineering Physicist), November 1999, no. 16–18, p. 14 (in Russian).
- Kivinov A. Let's get acquainted. Gazeta Inzhener-fizik (Engineering Physicist), September 2001, no. 11–12, p. 4 (in Russian).
- Oganesyan A., Moskinov A. Let us be congratulated on. Gazeta Inzhener-fizik (Engineering Physicist), October 2001, no. 13–14, p. 5 (in Russian).
- Moskinov A. What if we join our efforts? Gazeta Inzhener-fizik (Engineering Physicist), December 2001, no. 16, p. 2 (in Russian).
- Moskinov A. Friendly match of century: MEPhI vs MSUCE. Gazeta Inzhener-fizik (Engineering Physicist), December 2001, no. 17–19, p. 5 (in Russian).
- Kalmykov P. MEPhI is 60 and I am 18. Gazeta Inzhener-fizik (Engineering Physicist), November 2002, no. 15–17, p. 5 (in Russian).
- Arephinkina R. We have won. Gazeta Inzhener-fizik (Engineering Physicist), no. 18–19, December 2004, p. 5 (in Russian).
- Chepurnova A. Physicists and lyricists with voice recorders. Zhurnal Studencheskiy Meridian (Student's Meridian) 2005, no. 8 (in Russian).
- Getmanova T. ECU veteran Gazeta Inzhener-fizik (Engineering Physicist), no. 14–16, October 2005, p. 4 (in Russian).
- Shal’nova I. They have taken part in competition in Sochi. Gazeta Inzhener-fizik (Engineering Physicist), February 2006, no. 1–2, p. 7 (in Russian).
- Sil’tsova V. В. Thank you MEPhI students for your support it helped me to stay on the top of the wave. Gazeta Inzhener-fizik (Engineering Physicist), no. 16–17, December 2013, p. 8 (in Russian).
- Lampskiy L. Physicist’s Days and not only that. Gazeta Inzhener-fizik (Engineering Physicist), no. 7–8, April 2014, p. 6 (in Russian).
- Krylov G. The Eighth Creative Union- who are these people? Story about old organization with young team. Gazeta Inzhener-fizik (Engineering Physicist), no. 16–17, November 2014, p. 8 (in Russian).
- Krylov G., Struev S. Engineering actors and other A. Selin’s characters. Gazeta Inzhener-fizik (Engineering Physicist), March 2015, no. 5–6, p. 10 (in Russian).
- Litvinenko A. Physicist’s Days in National Research Nuclear University MEPhI. Gazeta Inzhener-fizik (Engineering Physicist), no. 7–8, April 2015, p. 8 (in Russian).
- Beshkenadze A. Let theatre be in KVN format.
- Khutsiev M. Minor Booker prize.
- Safaraliev G. First-year Students’ Event in Kolomenskoe.
- Khripko A. Chronicles and tales of the ECU. Moscow, 2019 (in Russian).
