= Sukhorukov =

Sukhorukov (Russian: Сухоруков, masculine) or Sukhorukova (Сухорукова, feminine) is a Russian surname, derived from the word "сухорукий" (literally mean "withered hand"), which may refer to:

- Alexander Sukhorukov (born 1988), Russian freestyle swimmer
- Anatoly Sukhorukov (1935–2014), Soviet and Russian physicist
- Arkadiy Sukhorukov (born 1947), Ukrainian economist
- Dmitry Sukhorukov (1922–2003), Soviet Army General
- Jury Sukhorukov (born 1968), Ukrainian Olympic shooter
- Nataliya Sukhorukova (born 1975), Ukrainian footballer
- Viktor Sukhorukov (born 1951), Russian actor
