= Dimitrakopoulos =

Dimitrakopoulos is a surname. Notable people with the surname include:

- Athanasios Dimitrakopoulos (1936–2022), Greek politician
- Arkadios Dimitrakopoulos (1824–1908), Greek merchant
- Christos Dimitrakopoulos (born 1974), Greek volleyball player
- Giorgos Dimitrakopoulos (born 1952), Greek politician
- Roussos Dimitrakopoulos, Canadian geoscientist
