= Leniart =

Leniart is a Polish surname. Notable people with the surname include:

- Arkadiusz Leniart (born 1991), Polish chess grandmaster
- Ewa Leniart (born 1976), Polish politician

== See also ==
- Lennart
