= Tyapkin =

Tyapkin is a surname. Notable people with the surname include:

- Arkadi Tyapkin (1895–1942), Russian footballer
- Ilya Tyapkin (born 1991), Kyrgyzstani runner
- Maksym Tyapkin (born 2001), Ukrainian footballer
