= Alexander Selin =

Russian author

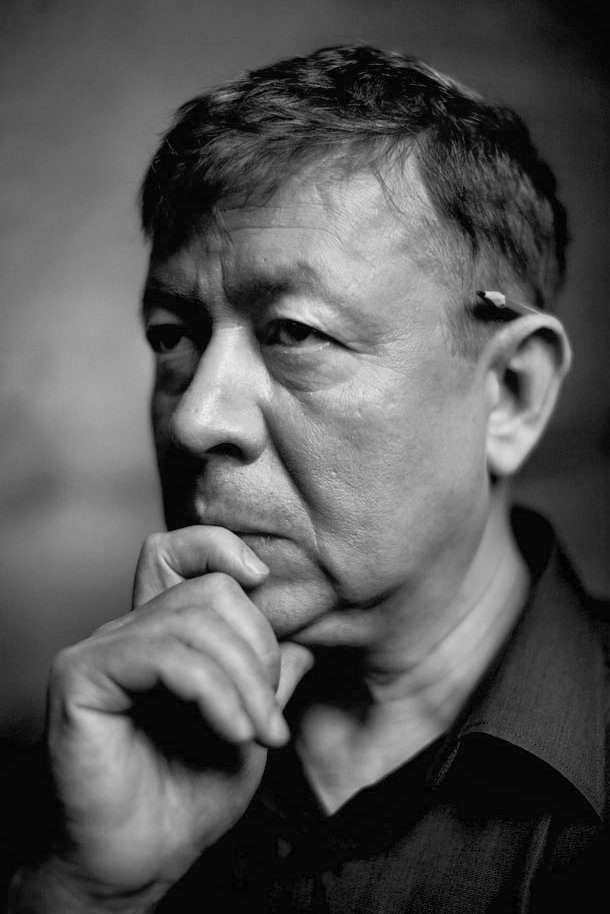
- Portrait of Alexander Selin from Snob magazine
- Born: 12 January 1958
- Died: 9 September 2014 (aged 56)
- Education: MEPhI
- Occupations: Writer, scriptwriter, stage director, literary figure
- Writing career
- Period: 1988–2014

Alexander Gennadyevich Selin (Russian: Александр Геннадьевич Селин); (12 January 1958, Volzhsky, Volgograd Oblast – 9 September 2014, Moscow) was a Russian writer, a scriptwriter, a stage director and a literary figure. He was an author of novels, stories, plays and screenplays.

Selin's creative work is characterized by a proper standard language, an original view and humour. Having debuted in literature with short stories A. Selin had enlarged the field of his creativity with writing novels and screenplays. His novel Tiridates the Third king of Armenia (Russian: «Трдат Третий, царь Армении») was the first large-scale narration about the time of early Christianity in Armenia. Staging of Selin's stories and performances based on his plays have been played in a number of theaters in the Russian Federation and Ukraine. His literary writings have been translated into English and French. A. Selin's literary works have been published in Solo (Russian: Соло), European Herald (Russian: Вестник Европы) and Snob (Russian: Сноб) magazines.

== Biography ==
Alexander Selin was born in the family of Khanzhov Vasiliy Semyonovich, the principal of Volzhskiy Hydraulic Engineering Technical College (later renamed as Volzhskiy Polytechnic Engineering School), and Khanzhova (née Kusakina) Valentina Matveevna, a teacher of Mathematics. After her husband's death Valentina Khanzhova married Selin Gennady Evgraphovich and Alexander's surname had been Selin since he was seven years old. Valentina was the Volga region hurdling champion in her youth. Alexander inherited enthusiasm for sport and Mathematics from his mother and gained the first athletics senior degree along with winning the oblast Mathematic competition (Mathematic Olympiad) during his final year at school.

There were three children in the Selins family including Alexander and two of his sisters Alla (born in 1966) and Tatyana (born in 1968).

In 1989 Eila Il'yashenko gave birth to Alexander's son Arvo.

A. Selin graduated from Moscow Engineering Physics Institute (MEPhI). During his study and work at MEPhI he headed amateur theatre group the Eighth Creative Union of MEPhI, was an organizer and one of the scriptwriters for popular institute cultural events, faculty night events, etc. The MEPhI ECU was a participant and a laureate of a great number of All-Union humoristic festivals.

Alexander Selin was an author of an idea and one of the organizers of the First All-Union Club of the Cheerful and Sharp-witted KVN Team Festival in Dnipropetrovsk (under the auspices of Alexander Maslyakov). Also, he took part in scriptwriting for several KVN teams of KVN Major League. In the summer of 2014 A. Selin was taken to hospital in long-term chronic conditions and was unsuccessfully treated there. He died on 9 September 2014.

== Oeuvre ==
«Alexander Selin work, sometimes called ‘ironic prose’, is, in reality, nothing else but his own ‘Selin’s prose’. He writes about Love, Death, Misery, Fear, Obsession but in a way few others do. The author avoids clear conclusions and dashingly twisted turns».

Alexander Selin's literature and video production activity started in 1988–1989. He took part in preparation of radio programmes, published his stories in newspapers and magazines including Student Meridian (Russian: «Студенческий меридиан»), Artefact (Russian: «Артефакт»), Day and Night (Russian: «День и ночь»), Solo and in foreign magazines [9] such as New Russian Writing, etc. He issued a storybook titled The Couch (Russian: «Диван»).

Alexander Selin's creative activities in 1989–1991were connected with little theatre Theatre of Social Horror (Russian: «Театр социального ужаса») when he had written scripts and staged three performances, namely Motherland (Russian: «Родина»), Baumstain (Russian: «Баумштайн») and Album (Russian: «Альбом»). Also, Alexander had taken part in development of dramatizations for theatre workshops of the Union of Theatre Workers.

During the following two years А. Selin was involved in making commercials for tourist agencies and commercial firms. At the beginning of 1993 A. Selin directed TV programme On the Other side of Television Picture Tube (Russian: «По ту сторону кинескопа») which was shown on Russia-1 television although it was the only release.

He started his cooperation with Video International (Russian: «Видео Интернешнл») as a stage director and a scriptwriter in 1994. He had created a multiplication cartoon series Secrets of Generic Castle (Russian: «Тайны родового замка») within the framework of the company's development plan.

In 1997 А. Selin was involved in RTR-Planeta TV Channel programme News Plus with Saveliy Plekhanov (Russian: «Новости-Плюс с Савелием Плаховым») as a scriptwriter and a producer. The same year Alexander's stories were translated into English in the US and published with the title of Beyond the Lookingglas.

8 Selin's stories were published in literature magazine Solo in 1997. The first storybook contained 21 of his stories (including Parachutist) and video play Baumstain were published in the same magazine in 1998. After a scandalous breakup with Video International in 1997 A. Selin was concentrated on his writing activity. He frequently read his stories in public in Chekhov library where he was noticed by the publishers.

Starting from the autumn of 1998 he worked over development of educational and entertaining projects for TVCenter TV channel.

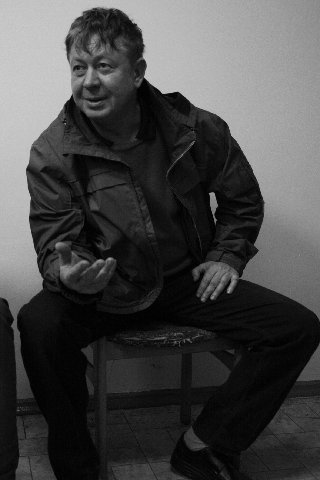

A. Selin's literary works were included into the number of anthologies and his stories were published. In 2003 Alexander wrote a script to Andrey and Olga (Russian: «Андрей и Ольга») film. It is not known for certain whether a based on the script film was shot or whether it was shot at a different title. That year performance Time to give birth (Russian: «Время рожать») was staged at Moscow New Drama Theatre. Snippets of A. Selin's story Alpatovka (Russian: «Алпатовка») were used in the performance.

2004 became fruitful in terms of Alexander Selin's creative work. At first two of his stories Aleksey Sychikhin (Russian: «Алексей Сычихин») and Blurred Semicircle (Russian: «Размытое полукружие») were published in the Town Zebra (Russian: «Городская зебра») magazine. After that storybook The New Romantic (Russian: «Новый романтик») which contained 36 of his stories was published. That year the storybook was translated into English as Alexander Selin The New Romantic.

In 2005 Narkas Iskanderova staged performance A Nightingale Was Singing and Lilac Was Blossoming (Pel solovey, siren' tsvela Russian: «Пел соловей, сирень цвела») at Moscow New Drama Theatre based on Selin's play.

From 2006 until 2007 Alexander actively developed his creative activities. That time the first Russian animated 3D feature film titled The Special One (written by A. Selin directed by Kirill Zlotnik) (Russian: «Особенный») was released.

The winter of 2006 was the time of beginning of Alexander Selin's literary works translation into French. The next year, in January 2007 young directors O. Anischenko and M. Belyakovich staged performance Parachutist based on A. Selin's story of the same name. O. Anischenko and M. Belyakovich staged one more Selin's performance Allegory (Russian: «Аллегория») based on The Song about Prince Oleg (Russian: «Песнь о Вещем Олеге») story which first night was in August 2007.

Selin spent ten years including some breaks for writing his novel Video Untermention (Russian: «Видео Унтерменшн»). Although he sometimes had to put off his work over the novel he managed to complete it.

The following years were marked with writing such literary works as novel Tiridates the Third king of Armenia, stories Haute Couture (Russian: «От кутюр»), Kit Makropulos (Russian: «Кит Макропулос»), New Year's Miracle (Russian: «Новогоднее чудо»), Red Foskey (Russian:«Рыжий Фоски»), Fairy Tales Ltd. (Russian: «Сказки ООО»), Woman's Happiness (Russian: «Женское счастье»). A part of A. Selin's stories were published had been published in prestigious literary magazine Snob. A storybook of 9 Selin's stories I Never Tell You the Lie (Russian: «Я тебе никогда не вру», French: Je ne te mens jamais) were published in French in 2010.

During the final years of his life Alexander Selin was working over his novel Tiridates the Third king of Armenia and planned to develop a script based on the book along with Tigran Arutuynyan, was completing novel Video Untermention and was trying to wright script Tunnel effect (Russian: «Тоннельный эффект») based on his story of the same name.

In 2013 novel Video Untermention was published in FTM publishing house. At the beginning of 2014 A. Selin's novel Video Untermention was nominated for literature prize Big Book (Russian: «Большая книга»).

== Publications ==
- Selin A. The Couch / Селин А. Диван. Москва, "Аюрведа", "Русский Пен-центр", 1998.
- Selin A. The New Romantic / Селин А. Новый романтик. Москва, "Зебра", 2004.
- Selin A. Video Untermention / Селин А. Видео Унтерменшн. Москва, "Книга по требованию", 2013.
- Selin A., Arutyunyan T. Tiridates the Third, King of Armenia / Селин А., Арутюнян Т. Трдат Третий, царь Армении. Москва, "Ритм", 2013.

Alexander Selin's literary works have been published in a great number of magazines, have been read in public and shooting of some films based on A. Selin's works have been planned.
