= Arcadius (disambiguation) =

Arcadius may refer to:

- Flavius Arcadius (377-408), Byzantine emperor
- Arcadius of Antioch, Greek grammarian
- Arkadios II, Monothelite archbishop of Cyprus
- Arcadius of Mauretania, 4th-century martyr
- Arcadius of Bourges, bishop and saint
- Arcadius (d. 437), martyr

== See also ==
- Arcadio
- Arkadiusz
- Arkady
