= Arcado =

Arcado may refer to:

- Arcado-Cypriot Greek, an ancient Greek dialect spoken in Arcadia
- Pilão Arcado municipality in the state of Bahia in the North-East region of Brazil. Pilão Arcado covers 11,731.5 km2 (4,529.6 sq mi), and has a population
- Arcado (ensemble), string trio featuring violinist Mark Feldman, cellist Hank Roberts and bassist Mark Dresser
  - Arcado (album), first album by the string trio
