= Arcadio =

Arcadio is a given name. Notable people with the name include:

- José Arcadio Buendía, fictional patriarch in the novel One Hundred Years of Solitude by Colombian author Gabriel García Márquez
- Arcadio Arellano (1872–1920), notable architect who was considered a pioneer during his time
- Arcadio González, former football player from Paraguay
- Arcadio Huang (born 1679), Chinese Christian convert, brought to Paris by the Missions étrangères
- Arcadio Larraona Saralegui (1887–1973), Spanish Cardinal of the Catholic Church
- José Arcadio Limón (1908–1972), dancer and choreographer who developed what is now known as 'Limón technique'
- Arcadio López (1910–1972), Argentinian football defender
- Arcadio Maxilom (1862–1924), Filipino teacher and hero of the Philippine Revolution
- Félix Arcadio Montero Monge (1850–1897), lawyer, a politician, and a union leader in Costa Rica
- Arcadio Padilla (born 1941), Mexican rower
- Arcadio Poveda (1930–2022), Mexican astronomer who developed a method to calculate the mass of elliptical galaxies
- Arcadio Venturi (1929–2025), Italian footballer
- Deputy Arcadio Kayo Ramos, main character in Lone Wolf McQuade

== See also ==
- Dr. Arcadio Santos Avenue, the primary east–west thoroughfare in Parañaque, southern Metro Manila, Philippines
- Arcade (disambiguation)
- Arcadia (disambiguation)
- Arcado (disambiguation)
