= Arkady Nebolsin =

Russian admiral (1865–1917)

Arkady Nebolsin Аркадий Небольсин
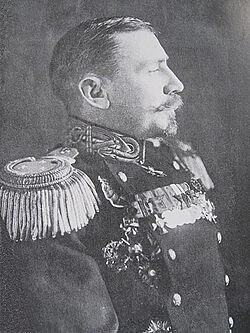
- Born: October 14, 1865; Saint Petersburg, Saint Petersburg Governorate, Russia
- Died: March 17, 1917 (aged 51); Sveaborg, Nyland, Finland, Russia
- Burial place: Orthodox Cemetery, Helsinki, Uusimaa, Finland
- Spouse: Caroline Wilkins (m. 1897)
- Military career
- Allegiance: Russia
- Branch: Imperial Russian Navy
- Service years: 1883–1917
- Rank: Rear Admiral
- Commands: Aurora
- Conflicts: Russo-Japanese War; Battle of Tsushima; World War I; Baltic Fleet Mutiny (DOW)

Arkady Konstantinovich Nebolsin (Russian: Арка́дий Константи́нович Небольси́н; 14 October 1865 – 17 March 1917) was a Russian Rear-Admiral of the Russo-Japanese War and World War I. He was known for taking command of the Aurora during the Battle of Tsushima after its previous commander, Evgeny Egoriev was killed in action. He was also one of the victims during the Baltic Fleet Mutiny after the Abdication of Nicholas II.

== Military education ==
Nebolsin graduated from the Naval Cadet Corps in 1886 and mine officer classes in 1901 at the hydrographic department of the Nikolaev Naval Academy (1892). In 1901 he graduated from the course of naval sciences at the Nikolaev Naval Academy. In 1886–1889, he circumnavigated the world on the Vityaz under the command of Admiral Stepan Makarov. In 1888, he took part in hydrographic work in the Sea of Japan within the Peter the Great Gulf. On January 1, 1892, he was promoted to lieutenant.

== Military career ==
In 1893, as a watchman on the armored cruiser Admiral Nakhimov, he participated in the official visit of the Russian Atlantic squadron to the United States and to France via the Mediterranean Sea. From 1894, 1895, he served as a watchman on the cruiser " Admiral Nakhimov " in the Far East.

In 1897–1898, he served on the Black Sea as a watch officer on the gunboat Kubanets, a flag officer under Rear Admiral Alexander Sidensner on the Berezan and a senior navigator on the squadron battleships Ekaterina II, Georgii Pobedonosets and on the steamer Eriklik. On November 6, 1898, he was appointed commander of the 1st company of the 29th Naval crew and on November 18, 1898, he was enrolled in navigational officers of the 1st category. From 1903 to 1904, he was the senior officer of the squadron battleship Rostislav. From 1904 to 1905, he was a senior officer of the 1st rank cruiser Aurora before being promoted to Captain 2nd Rank on March 28, 1904.

== Russo-Japanese War ==
Being a participant of the Russo-Japanese War and the Battle of Tsushima on May 27–28, 1905. An hour and a half after the start of the battle, despite being wounded in the head, shoulder and right knee, he took command of the Aurora after its previous commander, Evgeny Egoriev was killed. On the afternoon of May 28, 1905, the commander of the cruising detachment, Rear Admiral Oskar Enkvist, moved with his headquarters to the Aurora and, by his order, post-factum appointed Nebolsin as commander of the Aurora. Nebolsin successfully brought the cruiser to the port of Manila and spared the ship from complete destruction. For courage and bravery shown in the Battle of Tsushimam he was awarded the Order of Saint Anna, 2nd class with swords on June 18, 1907.

From 1905 to 1909, he was a naval attache representing Russia to the United States and participated in the negotiations of the Treaty of Portsmouth. From 1909 to 1911, he was the commander of the gunboat Korietz II as part of the 2nd mine division of the Baltic Fleet in Sveaborg and the head of the detachment of gunboats Korietz II, Bobr and Gilyak as part of the Training Artillery Detachment in Revel.

== Interim years ==
On October 18, 1910, he was promoted to Captain 1st Rank. From 1911 to 1914, he was the commander of the battleship Imperator Pavel I as part of the 2nd brigade of battleships of the Baltic Fleet. With this position, Nebolsin was entrusted with the responsibility of fine-tuning and testing all the systems of the Imperator Pavel I, as well as training the crew with the new equipment. Based on the results of the great work done, he published the work "Description of the device of the battleship" Imperator Pavel I", a detailed practical guide for in-depth study of the ship by its officers.

== World War I ==
On October 20, 1914, he was appointed commander under the braid pennant of the newly formed 1st brigade of battleships of the Baltic Sea, consisting of the battleships Sevastopol, Poltava, Gangut and Petropavlovsk. As he did while commanding the Imperator Pavel I, Nebolsin trained the crews of the ships, repairing the Gangut and prepared three battleships for testing, successfully conducting these tests which resulted in all the battleships of the 1st brigade being put into immediate service and by the end of December 1914, stayed at the Sveaborg fortress in Helsingfors for the winter.

On January 29, 1915, by the highest decree of the Naval Department, he was promoted to Rear Admiral. From May 15, 1915, he was the head of the 2nd brigade of battleships of the Baltic Sea as part of the battleships Andrei Pervozvanny, Tsesarevich, Slava and Imperator Pavel I.

A participant of World War I, he served in the campaigns of 1915 and 1916, the 2nd brigade of battleships under the command of Nebolsin was part of the squadron of battleships of the Baltic Fleet (1st and 2nd brigades) under the command of Vice Admiral Ludwig von Kerber went to sea for maneuvers and firing, participated in two covert mining operations off the coast of Germany and in operations against German convoys on the approaches to the coast of Sweden.

On March 3, 1917, the day after the Abdication of Nicholas II from power, he was mortally wounded during the Baltic Fleet Mutiny at Sveaborg. On the night of March 4, 1917, he died of wounds in Helsinki. He was buried at the Orthodox Cemetery in Helsinki.

== Family ==
In 1897, in the city of Nikolaev, Arkady Konstantinovich married the daughter of the provincial secretary, Caroline Wilkins (1869 – January 4, 1948), with whom they had been friends since childhood. They had four children: Evgeny (March 15, 1898 – April 27, 1966), Rostislav (April 17, 1900 – September 16, 1990), Georgy (April 17, 1902 – March 24, 1964) and Elena (March 28, 1911 – September 5, 1999).

The journalist Paul Klebnikov is the great-great-grandson of Rear Admiral Nebolsin and the grandson of his son Rostislav Arkadyevich Nebolsin.

== Awards ==
- Order of Saint Stanislaus, 2nd Class (December 6, 1902)
- Order of Saint Vladimir, 4th Class with bow (1906)
- Order of Saint Anna, 2nd Class with swords (June 18, 1907)
- Order of Saint Vladimir, 3rd Class (December 6, 1913)
- Order of Saint Stanislaus, 1st Class with swords (November 2, 1915)
- Order of Saint Anna, 1st Class with swords (December 3, 1916)
- Nicholas II Coronation Medal (Silver)

=== Foreign Awards ===
- Bulgaria: Order of Military Merit, 3rd Class
- Bulgaria: Order of Saint Alexander, 5th Class
- France: Legion of Honour, Knight (1898)
- France: Legion of Honour, Officer
- Germany: Order of the Red Eagle, 2nd Class (July 12, 1912)
- Romania: Order of the Officer's Cross (1901)
- Turkey: Order of Osmanieh, 4th Class
- Turkey: Order of the Medjidie, 3rd Class
