= Arkadiusz Leniart =

Polish chess grandmaster (born 1991)

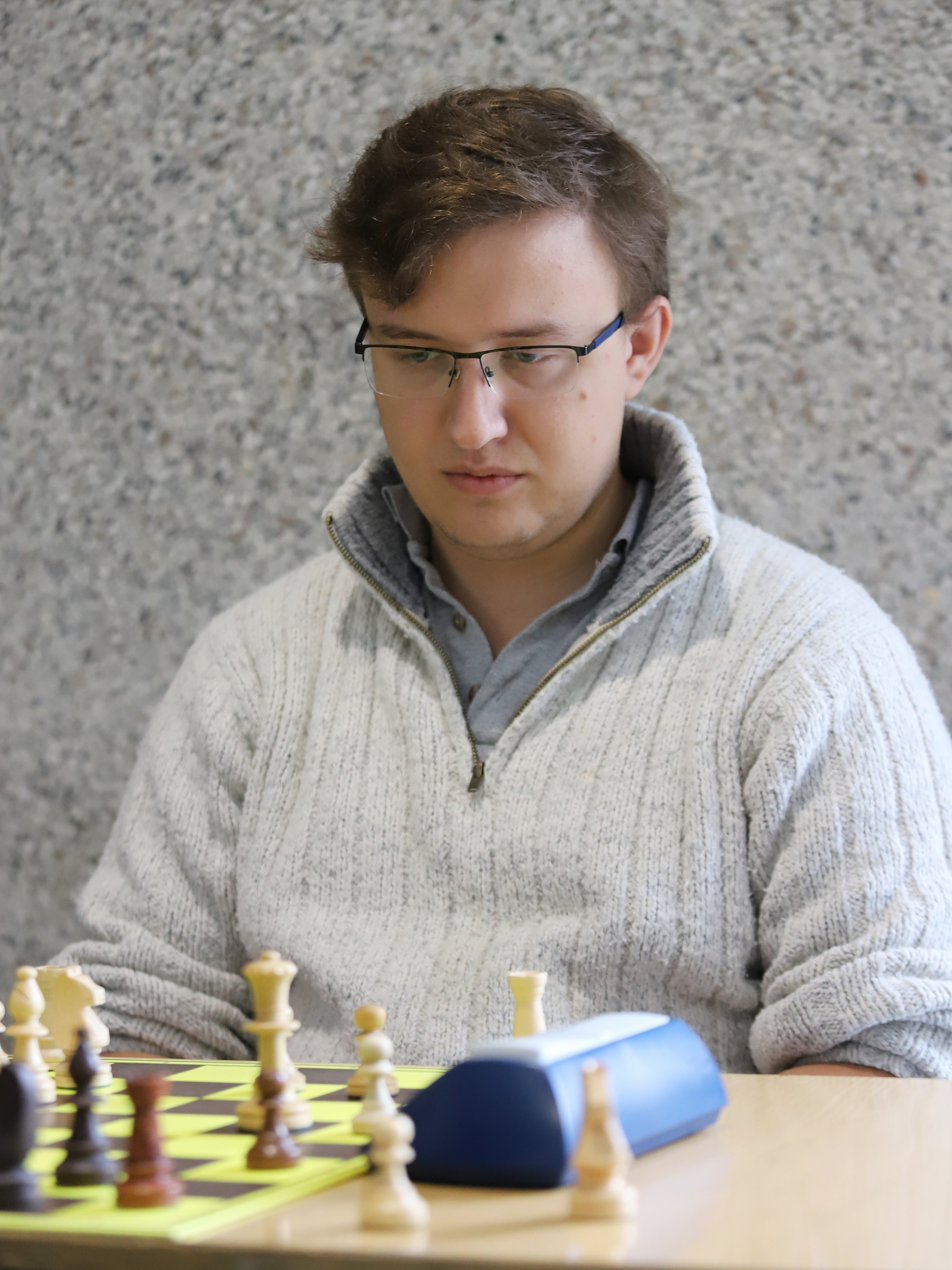
- Arkadiusz Leniart in 2021

Personal information
- Born: 20 June 1991 (age 35) Warsaw, Poland

Chess career
- Country: Poland
- Title: Grandmaster (2020)
- FIDE rating: 2473 (July 2026)
- Peak rating: 2508 (December 2019)

Arkadiusz Leniart (born 20 June 1991) is a Polish chess Grandmaster (GM) (2020).

== Biography ==
Arkadiusz Leniart is a multiple medalist of the Polish Youth Chess Championships: three times gold (Kołobrzeg 2001 - U10 age group, Wisła 2003 - U12 age group, Turek 2004 - U14 age group,) silver (Łeba 2006 - U16 age group) and twice bronze (Kołobrzeg 2002 - U12 age group, Leba 2005 - U16 age group). He also represented Poland many times at the European Youth Chess Championships and World Youth Chess Championships in various age groups. In 2006, in Herceg Novi he taking 5th place at the European Youth Chess Championship in U16 age group.

In 2003 Arkadiusz Leniart was awarded the 1st place in international chess tournament in Gausdal. In 2004 in Koszalin, together with the team Damis Warszawa, he won the silver medal of the Polish Youth Team Chess Championship and took 10th place in the Swiss-system tournament Aeroflot Open C in Moscow. In 2006, Arkadiusz Leniart took the 3rd place in the Corus 2006 Group 1B tournament and won the second silver medal (in the colors of Polonia TradeTrans Warszawa) at the Polish Youth Team Chess Championship in Szklarska Poręba. In 2007, he achieved the greatest success in his career so far, taking 2nd place in a very strong open chess tournament Aeroflot Open A2 in Moscow and fulfilling the norm for the title of grandmaster. In 2008, Arkadiusz Leniart took 2nd place (behind Manuel Bosboom) in one of the reserve tournaments of the festival Tata Steel Chess Tournament in Wijk aan Zee. In 2010, he shared the 1st place (together with Marian Jurcik, Eva Repková and Robert Cvek) in the open championship of Slovakia in Banská Štiavnica. In 2014, he took 1st place (together with Vladimir Malaniuk) in the cyclical tournament Cracovia in Kraków.

In 2009, Arkadiusz Leniart was awarded the FIDE International Master (IM) title and received the FIDE Grandmaster (GM) title eleven years later. He reached the highest rating in his career so far on December 1, 2019, with a score of 2508 points, he was then ranked 24th among Polish chess players.
