= Arkadiusz Litwiński =

Polish politician

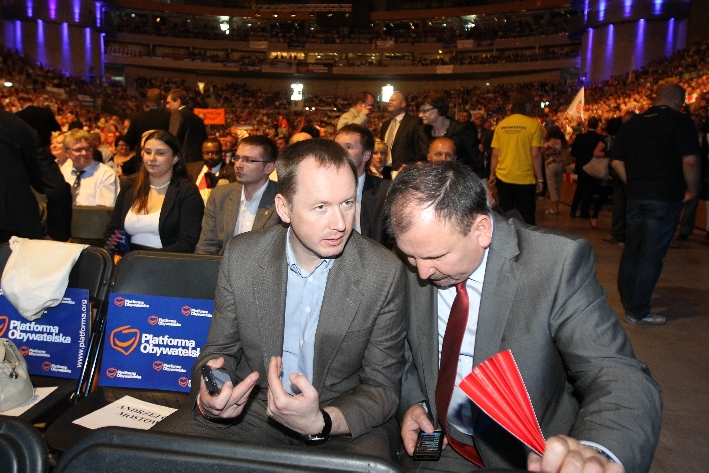
- Litwiński at the National Convention of the Civic Platform Ergo Arena in 2011

member of Sejm 2005-2007
- Incumbent
- Assumed office 25 September 2005

Personal details
- Born: 1970 (age 55–56) Szczecin
- Party: Civic Platform

Arkadiusz Litwiński (born 31 July 1970) is a Polish politician. He was elected to the Sejm on 25 September 2005, getting 7794 votes in 41 Szczecin district as a candidate from the Civic Platform list.

== See also ==
- Members of Polish Sejm 2005-2007
