= Evgeny Egoriev =

Russian captain (1854–1905)

Evgeny Egoriev Евгений Егорьев
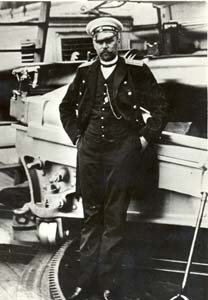
- Born: September 24, 1854; Reval, Estonia, Russia
- Died: May 27, 1905 (aged 50); Straits of Tsushima
- Burial place: Off the coast of Zambales, Philippines; 15°00′N 119°15′E
- Spouse: Anna Yakovlevna
- Children: 3 (including Vsevolod)
- Military career
- Allegiance: Russia
- Branch: Imperial Russian Navy
- Service years: 1870 – 1905
- Rank: Captain 1st rank
- Commands: Aurora
- Conflicts: Russo-Japanese War; Battle of Tsushima †

Evgeny Romanovich Egoriev (Russian: Евге́ний Рома́нович Его́рьев; September 24, 1854 – May 27, 1905) was a Russian Captain 1st Rank and war hero of the Russo-Japanese War. He commanded the famed Aurora during the Battle of Tsushima and despite the ship surviving the battle, he was killed along with 14 other crewmen.

== Origin ==
Evengy was born on September 24, 1854, at Reval, the son of Roman Petrovich Egoriev and Amalia Karlovna Maker, who was a Lutheran. He was baptized at the St. Mary's Cathedral, one of the oldest cathedrals in the city.

== Military career ==
Egoriev enrolled in the Naval Cadet Corps on September 16, 1870, and graduated on March 31, 1874, as a Gardes de la Marine. He was first assigned to the 6th Naval Crew on April 12 and was later promoted to Michman on August 30, 1875, but was suddenly transferred to the Siberian Flotilla on August 25, 1876. Within the flotilla, he was made part of the crew of the 2nd rank cruiser Abrek on September 1, 1876, and the Ermak on September 21, 1878, being made inspector of the latter on October 27. He was then stationed at the gunboat Morzh on May 29, 1879, made auditor of the ship on June 2 and made acting commander of the ship on September 16, 1880, with prior promotion to Lieutenant on January 1, 1880. On June 21, 1882, he was assigned to the gunboat Sable, made acting commander of the 1st Company and placed back on the Abrek on February 28, 1883, before being made official commander of the ship on September 12, 1883. Egoriev was then made a teacher of the School of Helmsmen and Signalmen and commands of the gunboat Nerpa and steamboat Amur on February 22, 1885, and April 2 respectively. He then commanded the Minonoska and made the Acting Adjutant of the Siberian Flotilla on August 2, 1885.

After returning as a teacher of the Helmsman's School on November 13, 1885, he was assigned to the gunboat Ermine and became the acting head of all arriving ships on February 28, 1887, but was transferred the Baltic Fleet within the 3rd Naval Crew on June 4, 1887. From January 18 to March 29, 1888, he took classes on mines and became acting commander of the 6th Company of the training corvette Skobelev on April 29, 1888. In 1891, he was promoted to Captain 2nd Rank and commanded the transport Bakan in 1894 and later, the ship Slavyanka from 1894 to 1895 as well as command of the port of Kronstadt from 1895 to 1897. He was then commander of the Gilyak in 1897, commanded the training ships Voin from 1897 to 1901 and Okean from 1901 to 1904. After being promoted to Captain 1st Rank in 1901, he was given command of the Aurora and took the ship to participate in the Russo-Japanese War. While moored at Nosy Be Egoriev acquired a python and juvenile crocodile which he then took with him when the fleet left the island. During the Battle of Tsushima, Egoriev was killed by fragments of a 75-mm projectile that exploded on the right gangway of the front bridge while he was at the conning tower. The Aurora itself managed to survive the battle and the surviving crew buried him off the coast of the Philippines.

== Awards ==
- Order of Saint Stanislaus: III Class (December 4, 1881)
- Order of Saint Anna, III Class (January 1, 1889)
- Order of Saint Stanislaus, II Class (1893)
- Order of Saint Anna, II Class (1896)
- Medal of the Reign of Emperor Alexander III (1896)
- Emperor Nicholas II Coronation Medal (1898)
- Order of Saint Vladimir, IV Class with bow (1896) for 25 years of service
