= Arkadiusz Szczygieł =

Polish footballer

Personal information
- Date of birth: 21 February 1975 (age 51)
- Place of birth: Chorzów, Poland
- Height: 1.72 m (5 ft 8 in)
- Position: Forward

Senior career*
Years	Team	Apps	(Gls)
1991–1992	Konstal Chorzów		
1992–1993	Stadion Śląski Chorzów		
1993–1997	GKS Katowice	74	(6)
1998	CKS Czeladź		
1999	Bobrek Karb Bytom		
1999–2003	Rozwój Katowice		
2003	Śląsk Świętochłowice		
2004	Ruch Radzionków		
2005–2007	Górnik 09 Mysłowice		
- * Club domestic league appearances and goals

Arkadiusz Szczygieł (born 21 February 1975) is a Polish former professional footballer who played as a forward.
