= Arkadiusz Gmur =

Polish footballer (born 1966)

Personal information
- Date of birth: 15 October 1966 (age 60)
- Place of birth: Warsaw, Poland
- Height: 1.86 m (6 ft 1 in)
- Position: Defender

Senior career*
Years	Team	Apps	(Gls)
–1983	Agrykola Warsaw		
1983–1987	Olimpia Warsaw		
1988–1992	Legia Warsaw	90	(3)
1993	Polonia Warsaw		
1993	Legia Warsaw	1	(0)
1993	Polonia Warsaw	3	(0)
1994–1996	AGF		
1996–2000	Herning Fremad		
2000–2001	Aalborg Chang		
2001–2002	Holstebro		

International career
1992	Poland	1	(0)
- * Club domestic league appearances and goals

Arkadiusz Gmur (born 15 October 1966) is a Polish former professional footballer who played as a defender.

== Career ==
In 1991, Gmur helped Legia Warsaw, the most successful Polish team, beat Italian Serie A side Sampdoria and reach the semi-finals of that year's European Cup Winners' Cup, where they lost 1–3 to English top flight club Manchester United.

In 1994, he signed for AGF in the Danish top flight, before playing for Danish lower league outfits Herning Fremad and Holstebro.

In 1992, Gmur made his solitary appearance for the Poland national team, in a 2–2 friendly draw with Guatemala.

== Honours ==
Legia Warsaw

- Polish Cup: 1988–89, 1989–90

AGF

- Danish Cup: 1995–96
