= Arkadiusz Bieńkowski =

Polish footballer

Personal information
- Full name: Arkadiusz Bieńkowski
- Date of birth: 12 January 1938
- Place of birth: Gdynia, Poland
- Date of death: 24 February 2007 (aged 69)
- Place of death: Gdynia, Poland
- Position: Forward

Youth career
- Kolejarz Gdynia
- 1952–1953: Doker Gdynia
- 1954: Start Gdańsk
- 1955–1956: Arka Gdynia

Senior career*
Years	Team	Apps	(Gls)
1957–1958	Lechia Gdańsk	6	(0)
1959–1960	Zawisza Bydgoszcz		
1961	Lechia Gdańsk	5	(1)
1962–1966	Arka Gdynia		

Managerial career
- Gryf Wejherowo
- Flota Gdynia
- * Club domestic league appearances and goals

Arkadiusz Bieńkowski (12 January 1938 – 24 February 2007) was a Polish footballer who played as a forward. He played a total of 11 times and scored 1 goal in Poland's top football league.

== Biography ==
During his early years Bieńkowski started playing football with many different clubs in the Tricity area, with Kolejarz Gdynia being his first club, but also spending time with the youth sides of Doker Gdynia, Start Gdańsk, and Arka Gdynia.

His senior career began with Lechia Gdańsk on 17 March 1957 in a Polish Cup game against Górnik Zabrze. Later that year Bieńkowski made his debut in the leagues, playing in the I liga for the first time on 22 September 1957 in a 4–3 away win over Lech Poznań. He went on to make 6 appearances in the league over two seasons before his transfer to Zawisza Bydgoszcz in 1959. As with many players at the time, the transfer to Zawisza was most likely due in part to his mandatory military service which was in force at the time, with Bieńkowski returning to Lechia two years later. He spent a final season with Lechia, making another 5 appearances and scoring 1 goal during the 1961 season, and playing 12 times and scoring 1 goal in all competitions for the club during his two spells. From 1962 until 1966 Bieńkowski played with Arka Gdynia until his retirement.

After his playing career Bieńkowski had spells in management with two clubs, Gryf Wejherowo and Flota Gdynia.
