= Arcady Zhukov =

Russian professor

Dr. Arcady P. Zhukov is a research professor or Russian origin, currently working in Spain.

Zhukov graduated in 1980 from the Moscow Steel and Alloys Institute (presently National University of Science and Technology), received Ph.D. degree from the Institute of Solid State Physics (Chernogolovka) of the Russian Academy of Science in 1988 and Doctor of Science (habilitation) from Moscow State "Lomonosov" University – in 2010. Presently -Ikerbasque Research professor at the Department of the Materials Physics of the University of Basque Country, Spain. He has published more than 600 referred papers in the international journals (total number of citations 11047, Citation H-index 58(WOS)/ 14798 and H=66(Google scholar)). A. Zhukov is included in the ‘Ranking of the World Scientists: World´s Top 2 % Scientists” elaborated by Stanford University based on citations, h-index, citations to papers in different authorship positions and a composite indicator.A. Zhukov is also included in the Rankings of 175 most relevant researchers in Material Science and of 224 most relevant researchers in Physics residents in Spain, elaborated by the Group for the H-Index dissemination (https://grupodih.info/), in the ranking of top Materials Science scientists ranking by www.Research.com, in the list of Most cited authors of J. Magn. Magn. Mater. (https://exaly.com/journal/12443/journal-of-magnetism-and-magnetic-materials/top-authors) – among the 10 most cited and of Sensors and Actuators A: (https://exaly.com/journal/13143/sensors-and-actuators-a-physical/top-authors).

A. Zhukov edited conference proceedings, chaired several international conference (Donostia International Conference on Nanoscaled Magnetism (DICNMA), III Joint European Magnetic Symposia, 24th International Symposium on Metastable, Amorphous and Nanostructured Materials (ISMANAM 2017)…), several sessions at various international Conferences, gave more than 100 plenary, keynote or invited talks at various international conferences. He is an associate Editor of IEEE Magnetic letters and International Journal on Smart Sensing and Intelligent Systems, member of several editorial boards and various committees of International Conferences (MMM, Intermag, joint- MMM-Intermag, MISM, ICSM…).

He is an associate Editor of IEEE Magnetic letters and International Journal on Smart Sensing and Intelligent Systems, member of several editorial boards and various committees of International Conferences, guest Editor of J. Magn. Magn. Mater, Phys. Stat. sol (A) and (C). A. Zhukov in collaboration with V. Zhukova wrote two books on magnetic properties and applications of glass-coated microwires, few book chapters (among them one for the Handbook of Magnetic Materials ed. by K. Buschow), articles for the "Enciclopedia of NanoScience and Nanotechnology" and "Enciclopedia of Sensors". Additionally A. Zhukov is the Editor of two books.

In 2000 A. Zhukov funded a spin-off company "TAMAG" involved in magnetic microsensors development, where he is currently the scientific supervisor. Most scientific activity is related to studies of magnetic properties of amorphous and nanocrystalline glass-coated microwires (typically of 1-30 micrometers in diameter) such as Giant Magnetoimpedance, GMI, effect and fast domain wall propagation.
