= Robert Cvek =

Czech chess grandmaster (born 1979)

Personal information
- Born: 6 January 1979 (age 47) Krnov, Czechoslovakia

Chess career
- Country: Czech Republic
- Title: Grandmaster (2007)
- Peak rating: 2563 (May 2012)

Robert Cvek (born 6 January 1979) is a Czech chess Grandmaster.

== Career ==
Cvek won the Czech Youth Championship at the U14 level in 1993, U16 in 1994, and U20 in 1999. At the European Youth Chess Championship, he tied for second place in the U14 section in 1993 and tied for third in the U18 section in 1996.

He achieved his norms for the Grandmaster (GM) title at the Pardubice Open (2004), the Trade Fair Festival in Brno (2005), and the Mitropa Cup in Brno (2006). FIDE awarded him the GM title in January 2007.

In 2009, he won the Metalmex Open in Liberec with a score of 8.5/9.

=== Team chess ===
Cvek represented the Czech Republic at the 37th Chess Olympiad in 2006 and at the European Team Chess Championship in 2009. He also competed in five Mitropa Cups (1999, 2000, 2002, 2006, and 2012), winning team silver and individual gold on board one in 2006.

In the Czech Extraliga, he won team national titles with A64 MILO Olomouc (1998), ŠK Dům armády Prague (1999), ŠK Hagemann Opava (2002, 2004), and Novoborský ŠK (nine consecutive titles from 2008 to 2017). With Novoborský ŠK, he won the European Chess Club Cup in 2013 and placed third in 2011.

== Publications ==
- With Lukáš Klíma: Lázeňské rošády: mistrovství ČR v šachu, Karlovy Vary 2005. Žár, 2013. ISBN 978-80-867-2503-1.
- With Lukáš Klíma: Rošády pod Špilberkem: mistrovství ČR v šachu, Brno 2006. Žár, 2013. ISBN 978-80-867-2504-8.
