= Arkadi Krasavin =

Russian footballer

Personal information
- Full name: Arkadi Ivanovich Krasavin
- Date of birth: 5 January 1967 (age 59)
- Place of birth: Kostroma, Russian SFSR
- Height: 1.75 m (5 ft 9 in)
- Position: Defender

Senior career*
Years	Team	Apps	(Gls)
1983–1986	FC Spartak Kostroma	80	(1)
1987–1988	FC Dynamo-2 Moscow	56	(1)
1989	FC Dynamo Moscow	0	(0)
1989–1992	FC Dynamo Stavropol	130	(1)
1993–1995	FC Chernomorets Novorossiysk	77	(4)
1995–1996	FC Dynamo Stavropol	71	(1)
1997	FC Samotlor-XXI Nizhnevartovsk	28	(2)
1998	FC Dynamo Stavropol	36	(0)
1999	FC Baltika Kaliningrad	40	(0)
2000–2001	FC Volgar-Gazprom Astrakhan	63	(0)
2002	FC Dynamo Stavropol	38	(3)
2003	FC Spartak Kostroma	21	(0)

Managerial career
- 2003–2007: FC Spartak Kostroma
- 2008–2009: FC Baltika Kaliningrad (assistant)
- 2010: FC Zhemchuzhina-Sochi (assistant)
- 2011–2013: FC Spartak Kostroma
- 2015–2018: FC Spartak Kostroma (director of sports)
- * Club domestic league appearances and goals

Arkadi Ivanovich Krasavin (Russian: Аркадий Иванович Красавин; born 5 January 1967) is a Russian professional football coach and a former player.

== Playing career ==
He played for the main squad of FC Dynamo Moscow in the USSR Federation Cup.
