= Arkady Malisov =

Georgian-Russian footballer

Personal information
- Date of birth: 10 March 1967 (age 59)
- Height: 2.00 m (6 ft 6 1/2 in)
- Position: Goalkeeper

Senior career*
Years	Team	Apps	(Gls)
1986	FC Meshakhte Tkibuli	2	(0)
1987	FC Guria Lanchkhuti	0	(0)
1988–1989	FC Meliorator Kzyl-Orda	30	(0)
1991–1992	FC Start Yeysk	46	(0)
1993	FC Lokomotiv Nizhny Novgorod	2	(0)
- * Club domestic league appearances and goals

Arkady Malisov (Russian: Аркадий Борисович Малисов; born 10 March 1967) is a Russian former professional football player.

Malisov made two appearances for FC Lokomotiv Nizhny Novgorod in the 1993 Russian Top League.
