= Arkadiy Tumanyan =

Ukrainian footballer (born 1998)

Personal information
- Full name: Arkadiy Davydovych Tumanyan
- Date of birth: 23 January 1998 (age 28)
- Place of birth: Kharkiv, Ukraine
- Height: 1.71 m (5 ft 7 in)
- Position: Midfielder

Youth career
- 2007–2009: Kharkiv sports school 1
- 2009–2014: Metalist

Senior career*
Years	Team	Apps	(Gls)
2016–2017	Chornomorets Odesa	1	(0)
2019–2020	Junior Sevan	5	(0)
- * Club domestic league appearances and goals as of 23 November 2015

Arkadiy Davydovych Tumanyan (Ukrainian: Аркадій Давидович Туманян; born 23 January 1998) is a Ukrainian professional footballer who plays as a midfielder.
