= Pilão Arcado =

Municipality of Bahia, Brazil

Pilão Arcado Município de Pilão Arcado
- Municipality
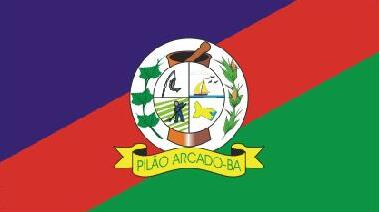
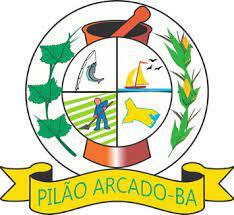
- Flag Coat of arms

- Location of Pilão Arcado in Bahia

- Location of Pilão Arcado in Brazil
- Coordinates: 10°00′10″S 42°30′14″W
- Country: Brazil
- Region: Northeast
- State: Bahia
- Founded: 1810

Government
  - Mayor: Orgeto Bastos dos Santos

Area
  - Total: 11,731.5 km^{2} (4,529.6 sq mi)

Population (2020)
  - Total: 35,175
  - Density: 2.9983/km^{2} (7.7657/sq mi)
- Demonym: Pilão-arcadense
- Time zone: UTC−3 (BRT)

Pilão Arcado is a municipality in the state of Bahia in the North-East region of Brazil. Pilão Arcado covers 11,731.5 km^{2} (4,529.6 mi^{2}), and has a population of 35,175 with a population density of 3 inhabitants per square kilometer.

Pilão Arcado was originally inhabited by indigenous people of the Mocoase and Acoroase ethnic groups. The first Portuguese inhabitants came from the Guerreiro e Bernardo family, both of Portuguese nobility. A chapel named Santo Antônio do Pilão Arcado and a parish of the same name were established in 1771. The municipality fell into violence between 1842 and 1848. War was declared between the families of Militão Plácido de França Antunes and Captain Bernardo José Guerreiro. The conflict ended on August 1, 1848 with the death of the final adult son of the Guerreiro family. Fighting between the families occurred in both Pilão Arcado and nearby Sento Sé.

== See also ==
- List of municipalities in Bahia
