= Arcadio González =

Paraguayan footballer (born 1979)

Personal information
- Full name: Arcadio González
- Date of birth: 30 November 1979 (age 46)
- Place of birth: Capiatá, Paraguay
- Height: 1.87 m (6 ft 2 in)
- Position: Centre-back

Senior career*
Years	Team	Apps	(Gls)
2001–2005	12 de Octubre		
2003	→ Cobreloa (loan)	17	(0)
2006	Sportivo Iteño		
2007–2008	Martín Ledesma		
2008	Fernando de la Mora		
- * Club domestic league appearances and goals

Arcadio González (born 30 November 1979) is a Paraguayan former footballer who played in his country and Chile.

== Honours ==
Cobreloa

- Primera División de Chile (1): 2003 Clausura
