= Arkadiusz Rybicki =

Polish politician

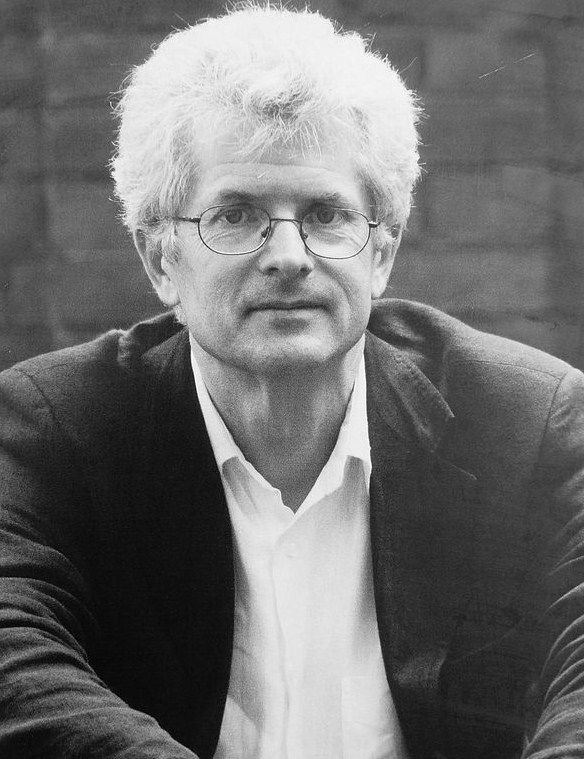

Deputy of the Sejm
- In office 25 September 2005 – 10 April 2010
- Succeeded by: Paweł Orłowski
- Constituency: 25 Gdańsk

Personal details
- Born: 12 January 1953; Gdynia, Polish People's Republic
- Died: 10 April 2010 (aged 57) near Smolensk, Russia
- Political party: Civic Platform

Arkadiusz Czesław Rybicki (12 January 1953 – 10 April 2010) was a Polish politician.

== Biography ==
Rybicki was born in Gdynia. In the 1980s he was active in the Solidarity movement. He was elected to the Sejm on 25 September 2005, getting 9466 votes in 25 Gdańsk district as a candidate from the Civic Platform list.

He was listed on the flight manifest of the Tupolev Tu-154 of the 36th Special Aviation Regiment carrying the President of Poland Lech Kaczyński which crashed near Smolensk-North airport near Pechersk near Smolensk, Russia, on 10 April 2010, killing all aboard.

== Honours and awards ==
In 1999 Rybicki received the Order for Merit to Culture. In 2001 was awarded the French Ordre national du Mérite, granted by President Jacques Chirac. In 2005 he received the Medal of the 25th Anniversary of Solidarity.

On 16 April 2010, Rybicki was posthumously awarded the Grand Cross of the Order of Polonia Restituta.

== See also ==
- Members of Polish Sejm 2005–2007
