= Arkadi Tyapkin =

Russian footballer

Personal information
- Full name: Arkadi Georgiyevich Tyapkin
- Date of birth: 1895
- Date of death: 1942 (aged 46–47)
- Position: Defender

Senior career*
Years	Team	Apps	(Gls)
1913–1916	SKL Moscow		

International career
1914	Russia	1	(0)
- * Club domestic league appearances and goals

Arkadi Georgiyevich Tyapkin (Russian: Аркадий Георгиевич Тяпкин) (1895–1942) was an association football player.

== International career ==
Tyapkin played his only game for Russia on July 12, 1914, in a friendly against Norway.
