= Arkadiy Sukhorukov =

Ukrainian economics professor

Arkadiy Ismailovich Sukhorukov
- Сухоруков Аркадій Ісмаїлович
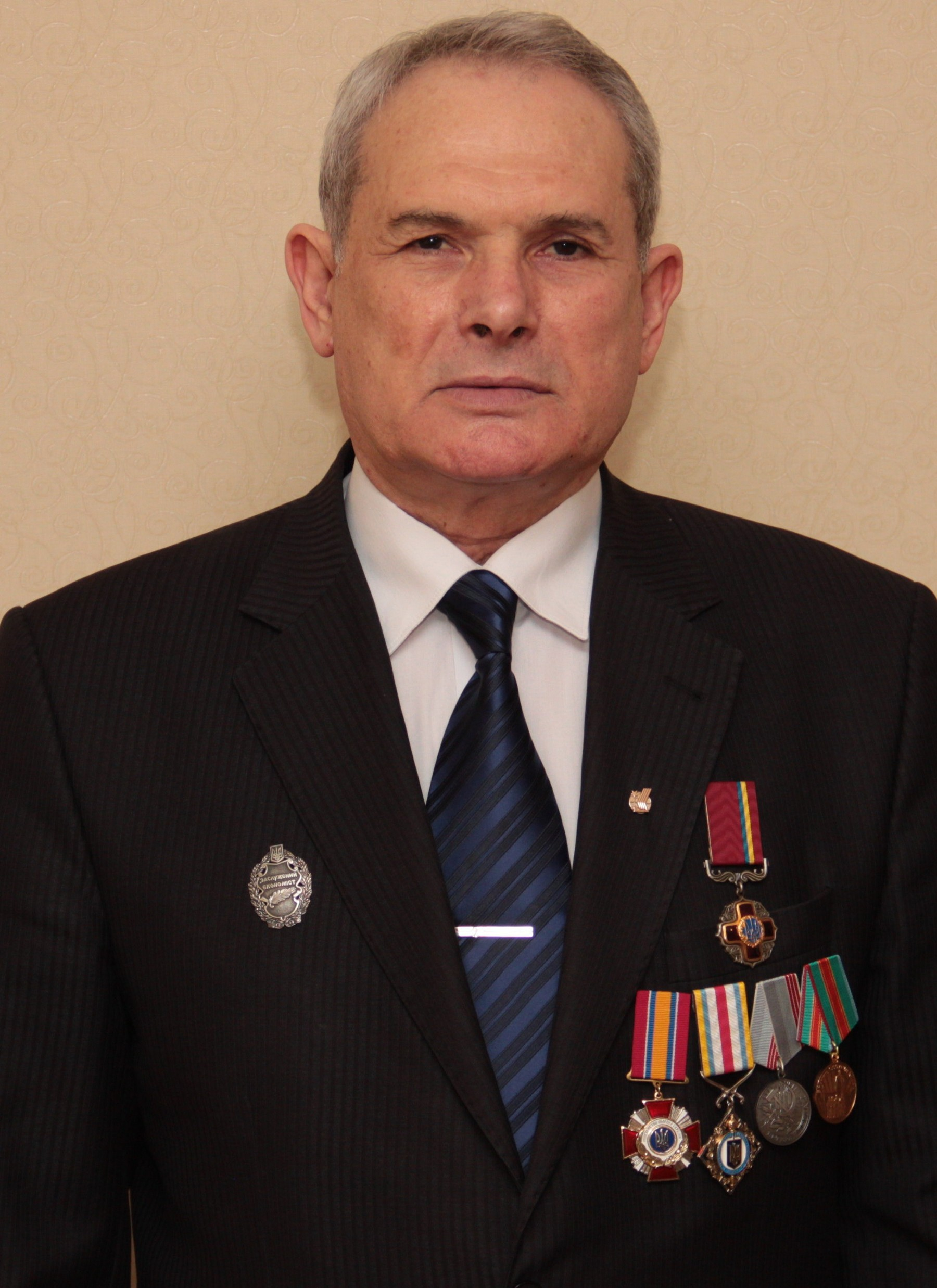
- Born: March 25, 1947 (age 79); Kyzylorda, Kazakh SSR, Soviet Union
- Awards: Honored Economist of Ukraine, Order of Merit

Arkadiy Ismailovich Sukhorukov (Ukrainian: Сухоруков Аркадій Ісмаїлович; born March 25, 1947) is a Ukrainian economics professor. He is an expert on economic security issues, a Doctor of Economics, Professor, Honored Economist of Ukraine, Member of the Academy of Construction of Ukraine, and the Knight of the Order "For Merits" III degree.

== Biography ==
Arkadiy Ismailovich Sukhorukov was born on March 25, 1947, in Kyzylorda, Republic of Kazakhstan. His father, Suhorukov Ismail Hasanovich (1913–1985), was a teacher. His mother, Sukhorukova Anna Lazarevna (1912–1986), was a medical worker.

In 1984 he defended his Ph.D. dissertation on the topic "Technological complete delivery organization of streaming housing and civil construction" of the specialty "Technology and organization of construction", the scientific degree of the candidate of technical sciences was awarded by the Higher Attestation Commission of the Soviet Union.

In 1989 he was awarded the title of Senior Researcher in the specialty "Organization of production (construction)" by the Higher Attestation Commission of the Soviet Union.

In 1996 he was awarded the degree of Doctor of Economics. His dissertation was titled "Regional problems of the formation and implementation innovation policy in construction" of the specialty "Placing productive forces".

In 2002, he started working as an associate professor in the Department of Public Finances; in 2003, he became a professor.

In 2003, he was elected a full member of the Academy of Construction of Ukraine, and in 2004 he was awarded the title "Honored Economist of Ukraine."

== Family ==
He is married to Sukhorukova Valentina Ivanovna (born 1945), who is an engineer of JSC Ukrgazproekt.

His daughter is Sukhorukova Olga Arkadievna (born 1975), an assistant professor of the National Technical University of Ukraine "Igor Sikorsky Kyiv Polytechnic Institute".

== Professional activity ==
Education: The State University of South Kazakhstan named after M. Auezov, Shymkent, building faculty, industrial and civil engineering (1963-1968); Kyiv National Economic University named after Vadym Hetman, Kyiv, Accounting and Economics Faculty, accounting in industry (1971-1975).

A. Sukhorukov, working in construction, rose to become the head of the department at Golovkivmiskbud in 1977, from his beginning as a carpenter in the trust of Shymkentprombud in 1963. During his work at the Research Institute of Construction Production, the State Construction Committee of Ukraine (1977-1992) carried out research and development works with automated planning of engineering, economic substantiation of housing construction systems of high comfort, estimation of the technical-economic level and forecasting of the construction complex development of Ukraine. Working in the Study Council of Productive Forces of the National Academy of Sciences of Ukraine (1993-1997), he substantiated the economic-mathematical model of capital investments optimal placement in the regions of Ukraine, which was implemented with programs of socio-economic development of subregions.

Since 1997 he has carried out scientific and analytical support for the National Security and Defense Council of Ukraine and other presidential and governmental structures, and has made a significant contribution to the development of economic science and practice, in particular to the scientific substantiation of structural and institutional reforms in Ukraine. From 1997 to 2010, he worked as the head of the Economic Security Department at the National Institute for International Security Affairs. From 2010 to 2014, he worked at the National Institute for Strategic Studies under the President of Ukraine in (Kyiv) as an advisor and chief scientific officer.

From 2014 to 2016, he worked as a professor at the Management Department at the Open International University of Human Development "Ukraine" (Kyiv). Since 2016 he has been a professor at the National Technical University of Ukraine "Igor Sikorsky Kyiv Polytechnic Institute". He lectured at the universities and institutes of the United Kingdom (Glasgow), Hungary (Budapest), Poland (Warsaw, Toruń), Kazakhstan (Shymkent), and China (Chengdu).

In 2004 he headed the first specialized scientific council in Ukraine in the field of "Economic security of the state," founded a scientific school on the economic security problems of the state, and personally prepared 15 candidates to become doctors of science.

A. Sukhorukov is an editor of the magazine Global and national problems of the economy, which is included in the "List of electronic professional editions in which the dissertations results for the scientific degrees of the doctor and candidate of sciences can be published".

He has published 354 scientific works, including 1 invention, more than 35 monographs, textbooks and handbooks, and more than 20 state and departmental standards and methodical recommendations.

His main scientific interests are: economic theory, theory of investments and innovations, economic security, international and regional economics, media management, economic security of the state, international economy, regional economy, investment and innovation activity.

Sukhorukov's scientific achievements have found recognition outside Ukraine: some of his works have been published in the United Kingdom, China, Russia, Belarus, and Kazakhstan. He is a member of the Academic Council of the International Institute named after S. Kuznets, for his contribution to the scientific and creative development between Ukraine and Kazakhstan, and in 2006, he was awarded the title of honorary professor of the South Kazakhstan State University.

== Title, awards ==
- Medal In memory of the 150th anniversary of Kyiv (1982).
- Medal "Veteran of Labour" (1989).
- Honorary title Honored Economist of Ukraine (2004).
- The golden sign of IEUU for a significant contribution to the interests protection of the domestic commodity producer (2004).
- Award of the Ministry of Defense of Ukraine Badge of Honor (2008).
- Breastplate Honorary Award of the National Security and Defense Council of Ukraine I degree (2010).
- Honored Economist of Ukraine, Order of Merit Third Class (2011).

== Basic scientific works ==
- Innovative construction policy. - Kyiv: Naukova dumka, 1994, 100 p., / Sukhorukov A.I.
- Innovation model in construction. - London, Glasgo, U.K., E&FN Spon Chapman &Hall, 1996.- p. 10-18, /Suchorukov A.I.
- Theoretical aspects of investment placement in the region. - Kyiv: NDIBV, Collection of scientific works, 1997, p. 87-94, / Sukhorukov A.I.
- Organization of material flows. - K .: State Academy Tax Service of Ukraine, 2000, 105 p.
- Economics and organization of innovation function. -K .: Institute of Municipal Management and Business. - Kyiv: 2001, 185 p.
- Methodical recommendations for assessing the level of economic security in Ukraine - Kyiv: National Institute of International Security Problems, 2003, 64 p.
- Innovation management. - Kyiv: "Computer Press Publishing House", 2003, 207 p.
- Economics and organization of innovation activity - Kyiv: Publishing House "Professional", 2004, 960 р., In co-authorship Volkov O. I., Denisenko M.P.
- Transfer of economic crisis as a cause of imperfect cycles / Strategic Panorama. - No. 2. - 2004. - pp. 68-84
- Modern problems of financial security of Ukraine. - Kyiv: National Institute of International Security Problems, 2005, 140 р.
- Investing in the Ukrainian economy. - Kyiv: National Institute of International Security Problems, 2005. - 440 р.
- System of the economic state security. - Kyiv: Stylos, 2010 - 685 р.
- Modeling and forecasting of social and economic development of Ukrainian regions. - Kyiv: National Institute of Strategic Studies, 2012, 365 p. / By co-author Harazishvili Yu.M.
- Crisis transfer in the global economic environment // Trend, and cycles in global dynamics and perspectives of world development: Materials of International Conference, Chengdu, China, October 13–15, 2012 / Chengdu, Southwestern University of finance and economics.- Р. 41-42.
- Regional aspects of economic development and economic security of the state // Strategy of development of Ukraine (economy, sociology, law) - K .: NAU, 2013. No.2. pp. 51-62.
- Ensuring the safety of the socio-economic systems // International Conference of Industrial Technologies and Engineering. ICITE 2016. – Shymkent, M.Auezov South Kazakhstan State University, 2016. pp. 112-115.
- Influence of asymmetric information on economic security of the state, its regions and economic entities // In: Sustainable development - XXI century: management, technologies, models. Discussions 2017: Count. Monograph / Averikhina T.V., Adamets T.P., Anderson N.V. [and others]; NTUU - KPI them. I. Sikorsky //; Institute of Telecommunications and Global Information Space of the National Academy of Sciences of Ukraine / under the scientific direction. Ed. prof. Hlobistova E.V. - Kyiv, 2017. pp. 115-127 (in Ukrainian language).
- Sukhorukov A.I. Innovative orientation of social economic strategies / A.I. Sukhorukov // Economic security of the state and scientific and technological aspects of its provision: a collection of scientific works based on the materials of the international scientific and practical seminar, Kyiv, October 21–22, 2016 - Kyiv: MP Lesya, 2016. pp. 63-78.
- Sukhorukov A.I. Prerequisites for the safe development of socio-economic systems // Collection of scientific works "Scientific Herald of the International Humanitarian University". Series: Economics and Management, Issue 27, Part 1. - Odesa: 2017, p. 4-7.
- Fundamentals of Media Management: a manual for students of the specialty 073 "Management", specialization "Media Management and Administration in the Publishing and Printing Industry" / O. M. Barzylovich, Z. V. Grigorova, L. A. Punchak, A. I. Sukhorukov, O A. Sukhorukov, I. B. Shevchenko - Kyiv: KPI named after Igor Sikorsky, 2017. - 296 p.
- Sukhorukov A.I. The Influence of Asymmetric Information on the Economic Security of the State, Its Regions and Business Entities / In: Sustainable Development - XXI Century: Governance, Technology, Models. Discussions 2017: Collective monograph / Averikhina T.V., Adamets T.P., Anderson N.V. [etc.]; NTUU Kyiv Polytechnic Institute. Igor Sikorsky; Institute of Telecommunications and the Global Information Space of the National Academy of Sciences of Ukraine; Higher economic-humanitarian school / for sciences. Ed. prof. Hlobistova Ye.V. - Kyiv, 2017. pp. 115-127.
- Sukhorukov A.I., Sukhorukova O.A. Institutional and communication mechanisms of international economic convergence of Ukraine / Scientific herald of Uzhhorod National University. Series "International economic relations and world economy". - 2018, Issue 17, Part. 2. pp. 100-103.
- Sukhorukov A.I. Problemy i szanse Ukrainy w ramach nowych międzynarodowych projektów komunikacyjnych — Sukhorukov A.I. Problems and chances of Ukraine in the framework of new international communication projects // in the book: Sustainable development - XXI century: management, technology, models. Discussions 2018: Collective monograph / Minenko MA, Bendyug VI, Komarista B.M. [etc.]; NTUU "Kyiv Polytechnic Institute named after Igor Sikorsky"; National University of Kyiv-Mohyla Academy; Higher economic-humanitarian school / scientific editors prof. Hlobistov Ye.V. - Kyiv, 2018. pp. 71-83. https://conftef.wixsite.com/conf
