= Arkadiy Semyonov =

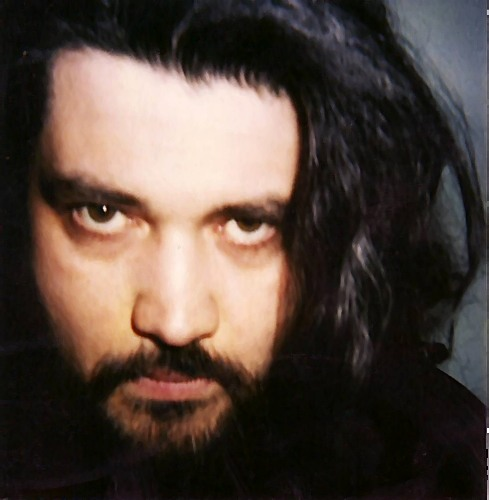
Arkadiy Semyonov

Arkadiy Semyonov (born 14 January 1959, Zhovti Vody, Ukraine) is a Russian poet, founder of group Vezhliviy Otkaz.

Since 1973 he lives in Moscow, where he finished the National Research Nuclear University. Bеing one of the authors of songs by Vezhlivi Otkaz, in the late 1980s he also became a journalist, participated in Karabakh movement, published "Wild division" newspaper (1990–1991).

In the 1990s, along with Ivan Sokolovskiy, he started the Soldat Semyonov project. He was the first producer of Natalya Medvedeva. He issued albums of Alisa, Boris Grebenshchikov and Zoopark on his own label "Zvukoreki".

== Discography (as Soldat Semyonov) ==
- 1996 — «Plan spaseniya Konstantinopolya» — CD/MC
- 1997 — «Ni shagu nazad!» — CD/MC
- 1998 — «Silovie polya tishini» — CD/MC
- 2000 — «Parallelnie deystviya» — CD/MC
- 2010 — Gusi-Lebedi (songs "Vremya" and "Tikireka")

== Links ==
- Official site
- Poems by Semyonov
- Semyonov on Youtube
