= Arkadios Dimitrakopoulos =

Greek merchant

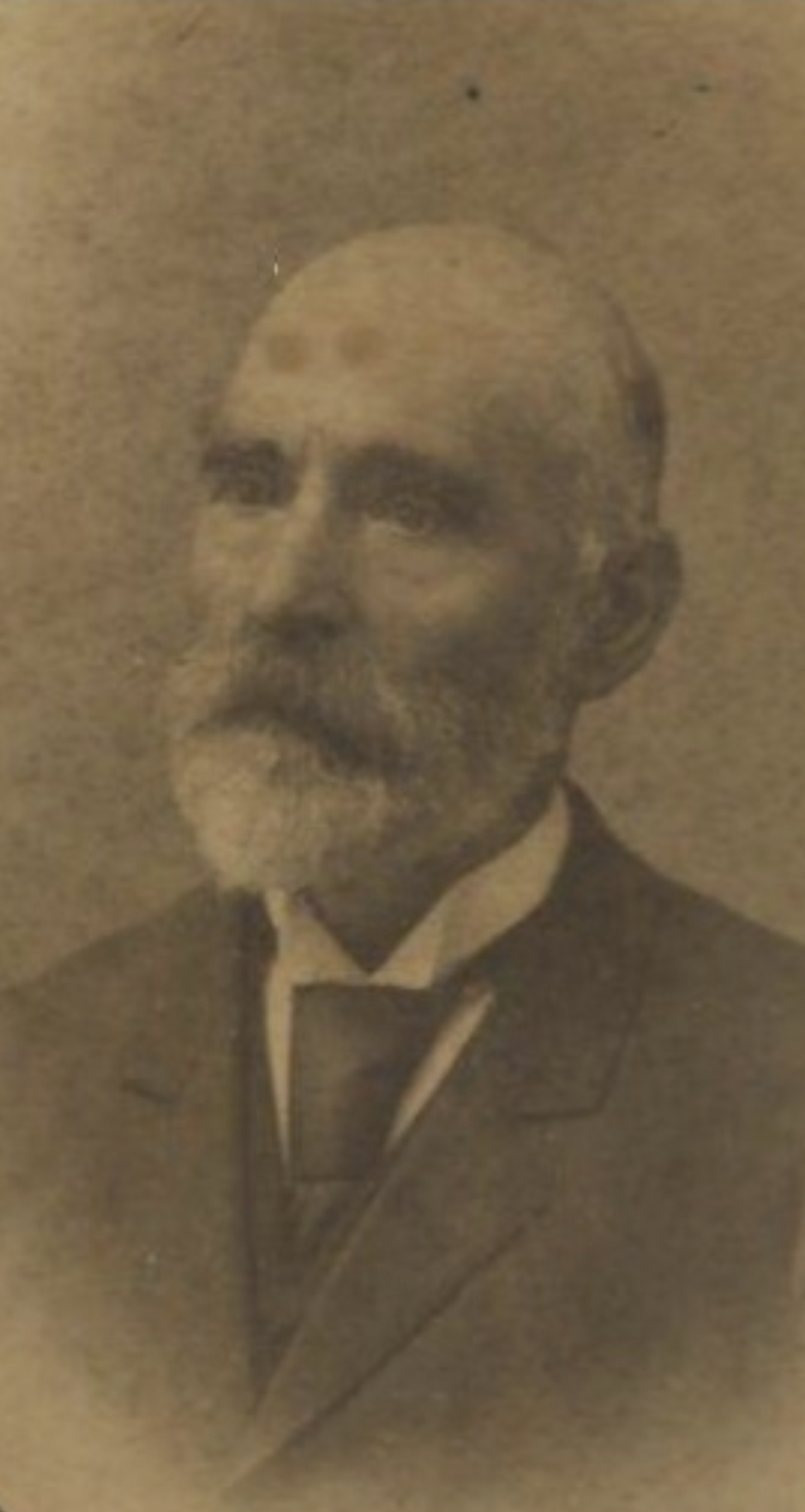

Personal details
- Born: 1824 Peloponnese, Greece
- Died: 1908 (aged 83–84) Burgas, Bulgaria
- Spouse: Maria Paschalaki or Paschalidou (1862)
- Children: 12
- Parent: Konstantinos Dimitrakopoulos (father)
- Occupation: Merchant, Businessman

Arkadios Dimitrakopoulos (Greek: Αρκάδιος Δημητρακόπουλος Bulgarian: Аркадий Димитракопулос (1824–1908) was a Greek wealthy merchant, father-in-law of Dimitar Brakalov, chairman of Greek educational society "Efxinos Pontos". and prominent figure of Burgas society in the 19th century.

== Biography ==
Arkadios Dimitrakopoulos was born in Peloponnese Greece, spent some time in Ermoupolis Syros and lived most of his life in Burgas. The famous Bulgarian historian Velko Tonev claims that Arkadios origin is from “continental Greece” but doesn't explain other information. Arkadios was enrolled in the high school of Ermoupolis. Andreas Dimitrakopoulos (born 1816), signed the school textbook of 1838-1839 as Arkadios' guardian. The family ties between the two have remained unknown. On December 17, 1842, in the age of 18 he gave the oath to become citizen of Ermoupolis Syros. Later on, although the family has resided and succeeded in Burgas, he followed the same process for most of his children for unknown reasons.

Dimitrakopoulos also served as the chairman of the Greek educational society "Efxinos Pontos". That was the oldest and longer lasting Greek educational association in Burgas and operated from 1879 until at least 1893, at the urging of the Metropolitan of Anchialos. It was founded by Metropolitan Vassilios and the Greek Deputy Consul Mavromichalis with the main goal of raising money for the new building of the Greek school. "Efxinos Pontos" funded the schools and the poor people in the city.

The Burgas local historian A. Hristov describes Arkadios Dimitrakopoulos among the wealthy Greeks - merchants from Burgas which have a significant contribution to the development of trade, from whose income funds are allocated for the development of modern Greek education.

== Business career ==
After high school, Dimitrakopoulos joined the family business and was sent as an agent in Burgas. At one point he was cut off and became independent. The Dimitrakopoulos family who was called Vonghizas family in the past, comes from the village of Langadia in Arcadia and was very successful in the transit trade of wheat and grains. His family leaves motherland Greece and settles obviously with the purpose of trading in Burgas – then under Ottoman rule. Just then, shortly after the beginning of the Tanzimat (1839), the restrictions of trade with grain in the Ottoman Empire are abolished and many merchants turn to perspective export ports like Burgas. According to the Bulgarian historian Mitko Ivanov, Dimitrakopoulos was a very wealthy man and probably the richest in Burgas at the time Dimitrakopoulos in 1878-1880 is one of the biggest wheat merchants, exporter of cereals and owner of big grain warehouses in the Port of Burgas. He even has his own pier in the port, one of only five existed. They were located on the site of nowadays railway station. Around the Liberation of Bulgaria (1878), the gardens and fields to the north of the city (nowadays in the centre of Burgas) were Dimitrakopoulos property. Starting from the present square “Troikata” to the present Burgas Free University there was a garden, the whole surrounded by fruits, among which there were hazelnuts and also a vineyard, property of Dimitrakopoulos. To the north of that garden around 1889-1890 the municipality started the new city cemetery. That place had earlier been a part of that garden. Dimitar Brakalov, a mayor of Burgas at the time, being a son-in-law of Dimitrakopoulos, asked from him to give a part of the garden – the northern – for a cemetery. After the death of Brakalov's wife and Dimitrakopoulos’ daughter she buried there. The transformation of part of Dimitrakopoulos ‘ garden into cemetery around 1885 is described in other documents, too.

== Personal life - family ==
In 1862, Arkadios Dimitrakopoulos was married with Maria Paschalaki or Paschalidou (born in 1845) and had 12 children. Alkiviadis Dimitrakopoulos son of Arkadios has served as member of the municipal council of Burgas (1893-1894, 1895–1897, 1908–1911).

Dimitar Brakalov former mayor of Burgas was married with Dimitrakopoulos' daughter. His daughter marriage with Brakalov brought numerous reactions among the local politicians and leaders at that time. Arkadios Dimitrakopoulos died in Burgas in the 5th of November, 1908 at the age of 83. The descendants of Arkadios Dimitrakopoulos resided in Thessaloniki Greece in the 20th century.

Dimitrios Dimitrakopoulos - Vonghizas, member of the family, was a Greek wealthy merchant who fought under the orders of Kanellos Deligiannis during the Greek War of Independence against the rule of the Ottoman Empire and benefactor of Langadia, Arcadia. In 1866, he donated 10.000 drachmas for the construction of Gymnasium of Langadia, Arcadia Dimitrios Dimitrakopoulos was based in Constantinople.
